= 2011–12 VfL Bochum season =

VfL Bochum
2011–12 season
- Chairman: Ernst-Otto Stüber
- Head Coach: Friedhelm Funkel (until 14 September 2011); Andreas Bergmann (from 15 September 2011)
- Stadium: rewirpowerSTADION
- 2. Bundesliga: 11th
- DFB-Pokal: Third round
- Top goalscorer: League: Inui (7); All: Aydın, Ginczek, Federico, Inui (all 7)
- Highest home attendance: 22,913 (vs FC St. Pauli, 12 August 2011)
- Lowest home attendance: 9,661 (vs FC Erzgebirge Aue, 4 December 2011)
- Average home league attendance: 13,756
Home colours	Away colours	Third colours

The 2011–12 VfL Bochum season was the 74th season in club history.

== Matches ==
=== Legend ===
Win Draw Loss Postponed

=== Friendly matches ===
24 June 2011 Friendly	DJK TuS Hordel	1 – 4	VfL Bochum	Kornharpen
19:00	Wagener 4'		Kefkir 5'; Aydın 22'; Federico 78'; Ginczek 82'	Stadium: Stadion zur Burkuhle; Attendance: 1,000

26 June 2011 Friendly	SC Preußen Münster	0 – 4	VfL Bochum	Laer
15:00			Ginczek 21'; Aydın 49', 60', 74'	Attendance: 1,600; Referee: Thorben Siewer

1 July 2011 Friendly	MSV Duisburg	0 – 2	VfL Bochum	Harsewinkel
17:00			Ginczek 61'; Reiche 80' (o.g.)	Attendance: 500

6 July 2011 Friendly	VfL Bochum	2 – 1	Aberdeen F.C.	Herne
18:30	Federico 42'; Aydın 89'		Mackie 85'	Stadium: Stadion am Schloss Strünkede; Attendance: 1,200; Referee: Christian Bandurski

9 July 2011 Friendly	VfL Bochum	3 – 0	Rangers F.C.	Bochum
15:30	Ginczek 64', 81'; Aydın 74'			Stadium: rewirpowerSTADION; Attendance: 5,400; Referee: Christian Fischer

12 July 2011 Friendly	SpVgg Gerthe 11	0 – 20	VfL Bochum	Bochum
18:30			Vogt 12', 26', 90' (pen.); Ginczek 15', 19', 27', 43', 52', 76', 86', 88'; Aydın 30', 55', 70' (pen.), 81' (pen.); Kefkir 38', 71', 74', 82', 87'	Stadium: Karl-Hirsch-Stadion; Attendance: 650; Referee: Eric Wollske

16 August 2011 Friendly	VfB Schwelm	0 – 16	VfL Bochum	Schwelm
19:00			Kefkir 11'; Chong 14', 31', 39', 42', 61', 90'; Ginczek 19', 45', 47', 54', 64', 85'; Vogt 49'; Toski 58'; Uzun 63'	Stadium: Stadion am Brunnen; Attendance: 1,200; Referee: Fabian Maiwald

31 August 2011 Friendly	SSVg Velbert 02	2 – 2	VfL Bochum	Velbert
18:30	Nigbur 17'; Onucka 64'		Aydın 53', 76'	Stadium: Stadion Sonnenblume; Referee: Sören Storks

7 September 2011 Friendly	SV Sodingen 1912	0 – 8	VfL Bochum	Herne
19:00			Inui 7', 53', 60'; Aydın 42', 62', 67', 83'; Kramer 77'	Stadium: Glück-Auf-Stadion; Attendance: 600; Referee: Cetin Sevinc

21 September 2011 Friendly	SC Weitmar 45 II	1 – 20	VfL Bochum	Bochum
18:00	Cuber 70'		Chong 9', 20', 24', 28', 38', 39', 40'; Johansson 10'; Freier 14'; Dabrowski 17'; Inui 31'; Sieper 41' (o.g.); Aydın 48'; Ginczek 49', 53', 58', 74'; Vogt 64'; Uzun 77'; Kefkir 84'	Stadium: Am Erbstollen; Attendance: 700

4 October 2011 Friendly	VfB Günnigfeld	0 – 2	VfL Bochum	Bochum
17:00			Federico 25'; Freier 66'	Stadium: Sportzentrum Günnigfeld; Attendance: 500

11 November 2011 Friendly	VfL Bochum	1 – 3	United States U-23	Bochum
11:00	Dabrowski 20'		Boyd 43'; Taylor 80'; Duka 83'	Stadium: Leichtathletikplatz am rewirpowerSTADION; Attendance: 150; Referee: Florian Steuer

14 January 2012 Friendly	VfL Bochum	0 – 0	Wuppertaler SV Borussia	Bochum
11:00				Stadium: Leichtathletikplatz am rewirpowerSTADION; Attendance: 600; Referee: Cetin Sevinc (Waltrop)

18 January 2012 Friendly	1. FSV Mainz 05	5 – 0	VfL Bochum	Mainz
18:30	Yilmaz 7'; Soto 23'; Choupo-Moting 34', 37'; Ujah 63'			Stadium: Stadion am Bruchweg; Attendance: 1,100; Referee: Markus Wingenbach (Diez)

22 January 2012 Friendly	VfL Bochum	1 – 2	Alemannia Aachen	Side
14:00 MEZ	Chong 49' (pen.)		Radu 55', 70' (pen.)	Attendance: 100

25 January 2012 Friendly	FC Rubin Kazan	2 – 1	VfL Bochum	Belek
15:30 MEZ	Kasaev 37'; Portynagin 77'		Inui 30'

29 January 2012 Friendly	VfL Bochum	0 – 1	FSV Frankfurt	Bochum
15:00			Cinaz 79'	Stadium: Leichtathletikplatz am rewirpowerSTADION; Attendance: 500; Referee: Stefan Glasmacher (Alsdorf)

=== 2. Bundesliga ===
18 July 2011 1	Fortuna Düsseldorf	2 – 0	VfL Bochum	Düsseldorf
20:15	Rösler 66'; Bröker 88'			Stadium: Esprit Arena; Attendance: 33,150; Referee: Felix Brych (Munich)

22 July 2011 2	VfL Bochum	1 – 0	FSV Frankfurt	Bochum
18:00	Ginczek 88'			Stadium: rewirpowerSTADION; Attendance: 12,313; Referee: Robert Hartmann (Wangen

8 August 2011 3	FC Hansa Rostock	0 – 0	VfL Bochum	Dresden
20:15				Stadium: DKB-Arena; Attendance: 15,500; Referee: Bibiana Steinhaus (Hannover)

12 August 2011 4	VfL Bochum	1 – 2	FC St. Pauli	Bochum
20:30	Dabrowski 7'		Bartels 32'; Kruse 84'	Stadium: rewirpowerSTADION; Attendance: 22,913; Referee: Markus Wingenbach (Diez)

20 August 2011 5	1. FC Union Berlin	2 – 1	VfL Bochum	Berlin
13:00	Silvio 45' (pen.); Mosquera 64'		Inui 38'	Stadium: Stadion An der Alten Försterei; Attendance: 14,388; Referee: Deniz Aytekin (Oberasbach)

26 August 2011 6	VfL Bochum	1 – 4	SpVgg Greuther Fürth	Bochum
18:00	Freier 41'		Sararer 35', 68'; Occean 52'; Nöthe 60'	Stadium: rewirpowerSTADION; Attendance: 10,719; Referee: Tobias Welz (Wiesbaden)

12 September 2011 7	Dynamo Dresden	2 – 1	VfL Bochum	Dresden
20:15	Subašić 45', 85'		Aydın 90'	Stadium: DKB-Arena; Attendance: 22,604; Referee: Markus Schmidt (Stuttgart)

18 September 2011 8	VfL Bochum	0 – 4	SC Paderborn 07	Bochum
13:30			Brandy 45', 64'; Proschwitz 78', 79'	Stadium: rewirpowerSTADION; Attendance: 10,407; Referee: Robert Kempter (Sauldorf)

25 September 2011 9	VfL Bochum	2 – 1	MSV Duisburg	Bochum
13:30	Dabrowski 17'; Ginczek 89'		Bajić 53'	Stadium: rewirpowerSTADION; Attendance: 13,227; Referee: Jochen Drees (Münster-Sarmsheim)

1 October 2011 10	FC Ingolstadt 04	3 – 5	VfL Bochum	Ingolstadt
13:00	Buddle 9', 20'; Buchner 43'		Chong 37', 61', 88'; Ginczek 79'; Inui 90+1'	Stadium: Audi Sportpark; Attendance: 6,008; Referee: Bastian Dankert (Rostock)

14 October 2011 11	VfL Bochum	0 – 2	Eintracht Frankfurt	Bochum
18:30			Acquistapace 16' (o.g.); Köhler 36'	Stadium: rewirpowerSTADION; Attendance: 20,132; Referee: Peter Gagelmann (Bremen)

21 October 2011 12	Karlsruher SC	0 – 0	VfL Bochum	Karlsruhe
18:00				Stadium: Wildparkstadion; Attendance: 12,327; Referee: Norbert Grudzinski (Hamburg)

28 October 2011 13	VfL Bochum	1 – 0	Alemannia Aachen	Bochum
18:00	Inui 39'			Stadium: rewirpowerSTADION; Attendance: 14,286; Referee: Christian Bandurski (Oberhausen)

5 November 2011 14	TSV 1860 Munich	1 – 3	VfL Bochum	Munich
13:00	Lauth 65'		Inui 8'; Benjamin 18' (o.g.); Aydın 90'	Stadium: Allianz Arena; Attendance: 18,300; Referee: Daniel Siebert (Berlin)

21 November 2011 15	VfL Bochum	0 – 1	FC Energie Cottbus	Bochum
20:15			Kučuković 77'	Stadium: rewirpowerSTADION; Attendance: 13,224; Referee: Robert Hartmann (Wangen

27 November 2011 16	Eintracht Braunschweig	4 – 0	VfL Bochum	Braunschweig
13:30	Kumbela 4'; Kruppke 18', 89'; Boland 60'			Stadium: Eintracht-Stadion; Attendance: 20,280; Referee: Tobias Stieler (Obertshausen)

4 December 2011 17	VfL Bochum	6 – 0	FC Erzgebirge Aue	Bochum
13:30	Maltritz 15'; Aydın 30', 83'; Toski 41', 50'; Federico 59'			Stadium: rewirpowerSTADION; Attendance: 9,661; Referee: Thorsten Schriever (Dorum)

10 December 2011 18	VfL Bochum	1 – 1	Fortuna Düsseldorf	Bochum
13:00	Inui 38'		Rösler 74'	Stadium: rewirpowerSTADION; Attendance: 17,300; Referee: Markus Wingenbach (Diez)

17 December 2011 19	FSV Frankfurt	0 – 2	VfL Bochum	Frankfurt am Main
13:00			Kopplin 20'; Chong 22'	Stadium: Frankfurter Volksbank Stadion; Attendance: 3,396; Referee: Harm Osmers (Hannover)

5 February 2012 20	VfL Bochum	2 – 1	FC Hansa Rostock	Bochum
13:30	Federico 19'; Gelashvili 75'		Borg 63'	Stadium: rewirpowerSTADION; Attendance: 12,819; Referee: Patrick Ittrich (Hamburg)

12 February 2012 21	FC St. Pauli	2 – 1	VfL Bochum	Hamburg
13:30	Schachten 26', 81'		Azaouagh 18'	Stadium: Millerntor-Stadion; Attendance: 24,257; Referee: Bastian Dankert (Rostock)

18 February 2012 22	VfL Bochum	4 – 2	1. FC Union Berlin	Bochum
13:00	Azaouagh 40' (pen.); Federico 63' (pen.), 81'; Aydın 76'		Zoundi 66'; Silvio 72' (pen.)	Stadium: rewirpowerSTADION; Attendance: 11,501; Referee: Martin Petersen (Stuttgart)

25 February 2012 23	SpVgg Greuther Fürth	6 – 2	VfL Bochum	Fürth
13:00	Asamoah 21', 50'; Vogt 40' (o.g.); Prib 61'; Schahin 72'; Nehrig 85' (pen.)		Inui 8'; Kramer 65'	Stadium: Trolli Arena; Attendance: 8,615; Referee: Peter Gagelmann (Bremen)

2 March 2012 24	VfL Bochum	0 – 2	Dynamo Dresden	Bochum
20:30			Dedič 11'; Fořt 47'	Stadium: rewirpowerSTADION; Attendance: 14,498; Referee: Robert Kempter (Sauldorf)

9 March 2012 25	SC Paderborn 07	0 – 0	VfL Bochum	Paderborn
18:00				Stadium: Energieteam Arena; Attendance: 13,202; Referee: Tobias Stieler (Obertshausen)

18 March 2012 26	MSV Duisburg	2 – 1	VfL Bochum	Duisburg
13:30	Gelashvili 25' (o.g.); Exslager 78'		Inui 19'	Stadium: Schauinsland-Reisen-Arena; Attendance: 15,727; Referee: Robert Kampka (Mainz)

23 March 2012 27	VfL Bochum	0 – 1	FC Ingolstadt 04	Bochum
18:00			Caiuby 89'	Stadium: rewirpowerSTADION; Attendance: 12,346; Referee: Harm Osmers (Hannover)

30 March 2012 28	Eintracht Frankfurt	3 – 0	VfL Bochum	Frankfurt am Main
18:00	Idrissou 18'; Meier 32'; Hoffer 35'			Stadium: Commerzbank-Arena; Attendance: 39,300; Referee: Frank Willenborg (Osnabrück)

8 April 2012 29	VfL Bochum	0 – 0	Karlsruher SC	Bochum
13:30				Stadium: rewirpowerSTADION; Attendance: 10,311; Referee: Benjamin Cortus (Röthenbach)

11 April 2012 30	Alemannia Aachen	2 – 0	VfL Bochum	Aachen
17:30	Odonkor 26'; Streit 39'			Stadium: New Tivoli; Attendance: 17,505; Referee: Deniz Aytekin (Oberasbach)

15 April 2012 31	VfL Bochum	2 – 2	TSV 1860 Munich	Bochum
13:30	Ginczek 18'; Vogt 90+3'		Rakić 49'; Lauth 60'	Stadium: rewirpowerSTADION; Attendance: 10,132; Referee: Bibiana Steinhaus (Hannover)

20 April 2012 32	FC Energie Cottbus	1 – 1	VfL Bochum	Cottbus
18:00	Reimerink 33'		Vogt 57'	Stadium: Stadion der Freundschaft; Attendance: 15,822; Referee: Tobias Christ (Münchweiler

29 April 2012 33	VfL Bochum	2 – 0	Eintracht Braunschweig	Bochum
13:30	Freier 3'; Ginczek 90'			Stadium: rewirpowerSTADION; Attendance: 18,107; Referee: Guido Winkmann (Kerken)

6 May 2012 34	Erzgebirge Aue	2 – 1	VfL Bochum	Aue
13:30	Klingbeil 6'; Curri 66'		le Beau 57' (o.g.)	Stadium: Erzgebirgsstadion; Attendance: 12,500; Referee: Tobias Welz (Wiesbaden)

=== DFB-Pokal ===
30 July 2011 1	FC Hansa Rostock	2 – 2 (a.e.t.) (3 – 5 p)	VfL Bochum	Rostock
19:30	Jänicke 36'; Košťál 55'		Aydın 52'; Ginczek 72'	Stadium: DKB-Arena; Attendance: 12,700; Referee: Markus Schmidt (Stuttgart)
	Penalties
	Wiemann (penalty missed); Langen (penalty scored); Lartey (penalty scored); Ziegenbein (penalty scored)		Kefkir (penalty scored); Aydın (penalty scored); Freier (penalty scored); Federico (penalty scored); Maltritz (penalty scored)

25 October 2011 2	SpVgg Unterhaching	1 – 4	VfL Bochum	Unterhaching
19:00	Bigalke 66' (pen.)		Dabrowski 7'; Ginczek 21'; Federico 72'; Chong 75'	Stadium: Generali Sportpark; Attendance: 3,150; Referee: Martin Petersen (Stuttgart)

20 December 2011 3	VfL Bochum	1 – 2	FC Bayern Munich	Bochum
19:00	Federico 26'		Kroos 52'; Robben 90+1'	Stadium: rewirpowerSTADION; Attendance: 29,299; Referee: Michael Weiner (Giesen)

== Squad ==
=== Squad and statistics ===
==== Squad, appearances and goals scored ====
No.	Pos	Nat	Player	Total		2. Bundesliga		DFB-Pokal	
No.	Pos	Nat	Player	Apps	Goals	Apps	Goals	Apps	Goals
1	GK	(Germany) GER	Andreas Luthe	36	0	33	0	3	0
2	DF	(Germany) GER	Björn Kopplin	29	1	26	1	3	0
3	DF	(Germany) GER	Patrick Fabian	0	0	0	0	0	0
4	DF	(Germany) GER	Marcel Maltritz (vice-captain)	34	2	31	1	3	1
5	MF	(Germany) GER	Christoph Dabrowski (captain)	33	3	30	2	3	1
6	DF	(Germany) GER	Lukas Sinkiewicz	17	0	15	0	2	0
7	MF	(Germany) GER	Paul Freier	29	3	27	2	2	1
8	MF	(Sweden) SWE	Andreas Johansson (until 26 January 2012)	10	0	9	0	1	0
9	FW	(North Korea) PRK	Chong Tese (until 30 January 2012)	16	5	14	4	2	1
9	FW	(Georgia (country)) GEO	Nikoloz Gelashvili (since 30 January 2012)	13	1	13	1	0	0
10	MF	(Germany) GER	Mimoun Azaouagh	11	2	11	2	0	0
11	MF	(Japan) JPN	Takashi Inui	32	7	30	7	2	0
14	MF	(Austria) AUT	Denis Berger	17	0	16	0	1	0
15	DF	(Iceland) ISL	Hólmar Örn Eyjólfsson	11	0	11	0	0	0
16	MF	(Germany) GER	Kevin Vogt	16	2	16	2	0	0
17	FW	(Germany) GER	Oğuzhan Kefkir	8	1	7	0	1	1
18	MF	(Italy) ITA	Giovanni Federico (vice-captain)	31	7	28	4	3	3
19	DF	(Germany) GER	Matthias Ostrzolek (until 29 January 2012)	17	0	16	0	1	0
19	MF	(Germany) GER	Kevin Freiberger (since 2 March 2012)	1	0	1	0	0	0
20	MF	(Germany) GER	Faton Toski	17	2	15	2	2	0
21	FW	(Germany) GER	Daniel Ginczek	32	7	29	5	3	2
22	FW	(Germany) GER	Mirkan Aydın	25	7	22	5	3	2
23	MF	(Germany) GER	Christoph Kramer	35	1	32	1	3	0
24	DF	(Germany) GER	Philipp Bönig	6	0	5	0	1	0
25	DF	(Algeria) ALG	Antar Yahia (until 17 July 2011)	0	0	0	0	0	0
25	MF	(Germany) GER	Michael Delura (since 31 January 2012)	3	0	3	0	0	0
26	DF	(Germany) GER	Jonas Acquistapace	28	0	26	0	2	0
27	FW	(Slovenia) SVN	Zlatko Dedič (until 31 August 2011)	0	0	0	0	0	0
28	DF	(Sweden) SWE	Matias Concha	1	0	1	0	0	0
29	GK	(Germany) GER	Philipp Heerwagen (until 14 January 2012)	0	0	0	0	0	0
29	GK	(Germany) GER	Markus Scholz (since 25 January 2012)	0	0	0	0	0	0
30	FW	(Ghana) GHA	Hans Kyei (since 29 April 2012)	0	0	0	0	0	0
31	GK	(Germany) GER	Michael Esser	1	0	1	0	0	0
32	MF	(Germany) GER	Enes Uzun	0	0	0	0	0	0
33	MF	(Germany) GER	Philip Semlits	0	0	0	0	0	0
34	GK	(Germany) GER	Jonas Ermes	0	0	0	0	0	0
35	DF	(Germany) GER	Jannik Stevens (since 15 April 2012)	2	0	2	0	0	0
36	FW	(Germany) GER	Selim Gündüz	0	0	0	0	0	0
36	MF	(Germany) GER	Christian Mengert (since 2 March 2012)	0	0	0	0	0	0
37	GK	(Germany) GER	Felix Dornebusch (since 5 February 2012)	0	0	0	0	0	0
39	MF	(Turkey) TUR	Onur Bulut (since 6 May 2012)	0	0	0	0	0	0

==== Minutes played ====
No.	Nat	Pos	Player	Total	2. Bundesliga	DFB-Pokal
1	(Germany)	GK	Andreas Luthe	3270	2970	300
2	(Germany)	DF	Björn Kopplin	2457	2157	300
3	(Germany)	DF	Patrick Fabian	0	0	0
4	(Germany)	DF	Marcel Maltritz	3082	2782	300
5	(Germany)	MF	Christoph Dabrowski	2535	2252	283
6	(Germany)	DF	Lukas Sinkiewicz	1191	1060	131
7	(Germany)	MF	Paul Freier	1947	1783	164
8	(Sweden)	MF	Andreas Johansson	747	627	120
9	(North Korea)	FW	Chong Tese	1307	1127	180
9	(Georgia (country))	FW	Nikoloz Gelashvili	780	780	0
10	(Germany)	MF	Mimoun Azaouagh	676	676	0
11	(Japan)	MF	Takashi Inui	2815	2638	177
14	(Austria)	MF	Denis Berger	601	555	46
15	(Iceland)	DF	Hólmar Örn Eyjólfsson	699	699	0
16	(Germany)	MF	Kevin Vogt	876	876	0
17	(Germany)	MF	Oğuzhan Kefkir	158	158	0
18	(Italy)	MF	Giovanni Federico	2323	2066	257
19	(Germany)	DF	Matthias Ostrzolek	1463	1373	90
19	(Germany)	MF	Kevin Freiberger	24	24	0
20	(Germany)	MF	Faton Toski	1025	976	49
21	(Germany)	FW	Daniel Ginczek	1719	1491	228
22	(Germany)	FW	Mirkan Aydın	1226	1048	178
23	(Germany)	MF	Christoph Kramer	2536	2339	197
24	(Germany)	DF	Philipp Bönig	448	328	120
25	(Algeria)	DF	Antar Yahia	0	0	0
25	(Germany)	MF	Michael Delura	81	81	0
26	(Germany)	DF	Jonas Acquistapace	2490	2310	180
27	(Slovenia)	FW	Zlatko Dedič	0	0	0
28	(Sweden)	DF	Matias Concha	66	66	0
29	(Germany)	GK	Philipp Heerwagen	0	0	0
29	(Germany)	GK	Markus Scholz	0	0	0
30	(Ghana)	FW	Hans Kyei	0	0	0
31	(Germany)	GK	Michael Esser	90	90	0
32	(Germany)	MF	Enes Uzun	0	0	0
33	(Germany)	MF	Philip Semlits	0	0	0
34	(Germany)	GK	Jonas Ermes	0	0	0
35	(Germany)	DF	Jannik Stevens	100	100	0
36	(Germany)	FW	Selim Gündüz	0	0	0
36	(Germany)	MF	Christian Mengert	0	0	0
37	(Germany)	GK	Felix Dornebusch	0	0	0
39	(Turkey)	MF	Onur Bulut	0	0	0

==== Bookings ====
Players				Total			2. Bundesliga			DFB-Pokal		
No.	Nat	Pos	Name	Booked	(yellow card) (red card)	Sent off (straight red)	Booked	(yellow card) (red card)	Sent off (straight red)	Booked	(yellow card) (red card)	Sent off (straight red)
1	(Germany)	GK	Andreas Luthe	5	0	0	4	0	0	1	0	0
2	(Germany)	DF	Björn Kopplin	2	0	0	2	0	0	0	0	0
3	(Germany)	DF	Patrick Fabian	0	0	0	0	0	0	0	0	0
4	(Germany)	DF	Marcel Maltritz	9	0	0	9	0	0	0	0	0
5	(Germany)	MF	Christoph Dabrowski	2	0	0	2	0	0	0	0	0
6	(Germany)	DF	Lukas Sinkiewicz	4	0	0	4	0	0	0	0	0
7	(Germany)	MF	Paul Freier	8	1	0	8	1	0	0	0	0
8	(Sweden)	MF	Andreas Johansson	1	0	0	1	0	0	0	0	0
9	(North Korea)	FW	Chong Tese	0	0	0	0	0	0	0	0	0
9	(Georgia (country))	FW	Nikoloz Gelashvili	0	0	0	0	0	0	0	0	0
10	(Germany)	MF	Mimoun Azaouagh	1	0	0	1	0	0	0	0	0
11	(Japan)	MF	Takashi Inui	4	1	0	4	1	0	0	0	0
14	(Austria)	MF	Denis Berger	3	1	0	3	1	0	0	0	0
15	(Iceland)	DF	Hólmar Örn Eyjólfsson	1	0	0	1	0	0	0	0	0
16	(Germany)	MF	Kevin Vogt	2	0	0	2	0	0	0	0	0
17	(Germany)	MF	Oğuzhan Kefkir	0	0	0	0	0	0	0	0	0
18	(Italy)	MF	Giovanni Federico	4	0	0	4	0	0	0	0	0
19	(Germany)	DF	Matthias Ostrzolek	2	0	0	2	0	0	0	0	0
19	(Germany)	MF	Kevin Freiberger	0	0	0	0	0	0	0	0	0
20	(Germany)	MF	Faton Toski	7	1	0	6	1	0	1	0	0
21	(Germany)	FW	Daniel Ginczek	6	0	0	5	0	0	1	0	0
22	(Germany)	FW	Mirkan Aydın	3	0	0	2	0	0	1	0	0
23	(Germany)	MF	Christoph Kramer	8	0	0	6	0	0	2	0	0
24	(Germany)	DF	Philipp Bönig	3	3	0	3	3	0	0	0	0
25	(Algeria)	DF	Antar Yahia	0	0	0	0	0	0	0	0	0
25	(Germany)	MF	Michael Delura	1	0	0	1	0	0	0	0	0
26	(Germany)	DF	Jonas Acquistapace	1	0	0	1	0	0	0	0	0
27	(Slovenia)	FW	Zlatko Dedič	0	0	0	0	0	0	0	0	0
28	(Sweden)	DF	Matias Concha	0	0	0	0	0	0	0	0	0
29	(Germany)	GK	Philipp Heerwagen	0	0	0	0	0	0	0	0	0
29	(Germany)	GK	Markus Scholz	0	0	0	0	0	0	0	0	0
30	(Ghana)	FW	Hans Kyei	0	0	0	0	0	0	0	0	0
31	(Germany)	GK	Michael Esser	0	0	0	0	0	0	0	0	0
32	(Germany)	MF	Enes Uzun	0	0	0	0	0	0	0	0	0
33	(Germany)	MF	Philip Semlits	0	0	0	0	0	0	0	0	0
34	(Germany)	GK	Jonas Ermes	0	0	0	0	0	0	0	0	0
35	(Germany)	DF	Jannik Stevens	0	0	0	0	0	0	0	0	0
36	(Germany)	FW	Selim Gündüz	0	0	0	0	0	0	0	0	0
36	(Germany)	MF	Christian Mengert	0	0	0	0	0	0	0	0	0
37	(Germany)	GK	Felix Dornebusch	0	0	0	0	0	0	0	0	0
39	(Turkey)	MF	Onur Bulut	0	0	0	0	0	0	0	0	0
Totals				77	7	0	71	7	0	6	0	0

=== Transfers ===
==== Summer ====
In:

No.	Pos.	Nation	Player
6	DF	GER	Lukas Sinkiewicz (from FC Augsburg)
11	MF	JPN	Takashi Inui (from Cerezo Osaka)
14	MF	AUT	Denis Berger (from Kickers Offenbach)
15	DF	ISL	Hólmar Örn Eyjólfsson (from West Ham United F.C.)
21	FW	GER	Daniel Ginczek (on loan from Borussia Dortmund)
23	MF	GER	Christoph Kramer (on loan from Bayer 04 Leverkusen II)
26	DF	GER	Jonas Acquistapace (from VfL Bochum II)
32	MF	GER	Enes Uzun (from VfL Wolfsburg Youth)
34	GK	GER	Jonas Ermes (from VfL Bochum II)

Out:

No.	Pos.	Nation	Player
11	FW	TUR	Mahir Sağlık (to FC St. Pauli)
15	FW	GER	Roman Prokoph (to Kapfenberger SV)
20	MF	AUT	Ümit Korkmaz (loan return to Eintracht Frankfurt)
23	MF	GER	Marc Rzatkowski (on loan to Arminia Bielefeld)
25	DF	ALG	Antar Yahia (to Al Nassr FC)
27	FW	SVN	Zlatko Dedič (on loan to Dynamo Dresden)
--	GK	POR	Daniel Fernandes (released, previously on loan at Panserraikos F.C.)
--	DF	AUT	Christian Fuchs (to 1. FSV Mainz 05, previously on loan)
--	FW	SVK	Stanislav Šesták (to MKE Ankaragücü, previously on loan)

==== Winter ====
In:

No.	Pos.	Nation	Player
9	FW	GEO	Nikoloz Gelashvili (from FC Zestafoni)
25	MF	GER	Michael Delura (free agent)
29	GK	GER	Markus Scholz (from VfL Bochum II)

Out:

No.	Pos.	Nation	Player
8	MF	SWE	Andreas Johansson (to IFK Norrköping)
9	FW	PRK	Jong Tae-Se (to 1. FC Köln)
19	DF	GER	Matthias Ostrzolek (to FC Augsburg)
29	GK	GER	Philipp Heerwagen (on loan to FC St. Pauli)
