= 2009–10 VfL Bochum season =

VfL Bochum
2009–10 season
- Chairman: Werner Altegoer
- Head coach: Marcel Koller (until 20 September 2009); Frank Heinemann, ad interim (until 26 October 2009); Heiko Herrlich (until 29 April 2010); Dariusz Wosz, ad interim (since 30 April 2010)
- Stadium: rewirpowerSTADION
- Bundesliga: 17th (relegated)
- DFB-Pokal: Second round
- Top goalscorer: League: Stanislav Šesták (6); All: Stanislav Šesták (6)
- Highest home attendance: 30,748 (vs. Bayern Munich, 12 December 2009; vs. Borussia Dortmund, 13 March 2010; vs. Hannover 96, 8 May 2010)
- Lowest home attendance: 16,225 (vs. Mainz 05, 19 September 2009)
- Average home league attendance: 24,853
Home colours	Away colours	Third colours

The 2009–10 VfL Bochum season was the 72nd season in club history.

== Matches ==
=== Legend ===
Win Draw Loss

=== Bundesliga ===
9 August 2009 1	VfL Bochum	3 – 3	Borussia Mönchengladbach	Bochum
15:30	Azaouagh 51', 52'; Šesták 63'		Arango 19'; Colautti 26'; Brouwers 41'	Stadium: rewirpowerSTADION; Attendance: 29,766; Referee: Michael Kempter (Sauldorf)

16 August 2009 2	Schalke 04	3 – 0	VfL Bochum	Gelsenkirchen
17:30	Moritz 38'; Westermann 45+2'; Farfán 76'			Stadium: Veltins-Arena; Attendance: 61,673; Referee: Günter Perl (Pullach)

23 August 2009 3	VfL Bochum	1 – 0	Hertha BSC	Bochum
15:30	Yahia 47'			Stadium: rewirpowerSTADION; Attendance: 18,853; Referee: Felix Brych (Munich)

29 August 2009 4	Bayer Leverkusen	2 – 1	VfL Bochum	Leverkusen
15:30	Friedrich 41'; Kießling 68'		Friedrich 32' (o.g.)	Stadium: BayArena; Attendance: 27,122; Referee: Wolfgang Stark (Ergolding)

12 September 2009 5	1899 Hoffenheim	3 – 0	VfL Bochum	Sinsheim
15:30	Ba 16'; Obasi 58'; Compper 79'			Stadium: Rhein-Neckar Arena; Attendance: 29,500; Referee: Felix Zwayer (Berlin)

19 September 2009 6	VfL Bochum	2 – 3	Mainz 05	Bochum
15:30	Azaouagh 7'; Klimowicz 45+1'		Ivanschitz 45'; Schürrle 52', 71'	Stadium: rewirpowerSTADION; Attendance: 16,225; Referee: Babak Rafati (Hannover)

25 September 2009 7	1. FC Nürnberg	0 – 1	VfL Bochum	Nuremberg
20:30			Klimowicz 7'	Stadium: easyCredit-Stadion; Attendance: 35,376; Referee: Marco Fritz (Korb)

3 October 2009 8	VfL Bochum	1 – 1	VfL Wolfsburg	Bochum
15:30	Hashemian 53'		Martins 75'	Stadium: rewirpowerSTADION; Attendance: 21,710; Referee: Jochen Drees (Münster)

18 October 2009 9	Borussia Dortmund	2 – 0	VfL Bochum	Dortmund
17:30	Barrios 20'; Subotić 51'			Stadium: Signal Iduna Park; Attendance: 72,500; Referee: Michael Weiner (Giesen)

25 October 2009 10	VfL Bochum	1 – 4	Werder Bremen	Bochum
17:30	Šesták 1'		Hunt 9'; Marin 32'; Borowski 76'; Özil 90+1'	Stadium: rewirpowerSTADION; Attendance: 25,703; Referee: Peter Sippel (Munich)

1 November 2009 11	Eintracht Frankfurt	2 – 1	VfL Bochum	Frankfurt am Main
17:30	Caio 14'; Franz 53'		Franz 25' (o.g.)	Stadium: Commerzbank Arena; Attendance: 37,500; Referee: Peter Gagelmann (Bremen)

7 November 2009 12	VfL Bochum	1 – 2	SC Freiburg	Bochum
15:30	Klimowicz 65'		Butscher 23'; Reisinger 90+2'	Stadium: rewirpowerSTADION; Attendance: 20,403; Referee: Felix Brych (Munich)

22 November 2009 13	Hamburger SV	0 – 1	VfL Bochum	Hamburg
17:30			Grote 77'	Stadium: HSH Nordbank Arena; Attendance: 53,838; Referee: Günter Perl (Pullach)

27 November 2009 14	VfL Bochum	0 – 0	1. FC Köln	Bochum
20:30				Stadium: rewirpowerSTADION; Attendance: 29,102; Referee: Deniz Aytekin (Oberasbach)

5 December 2009 15	VfB Stuttgart	1 – 1	VfL Bochum	Stuttgart
15:30	Tasci 63'		Fuchs 89'	Stadium: Mercedes-Benz Arena; Attendance: 40,000; Referee: Lutz Wagner (Kriftel)

12 December 2009 16	VfL Bochum	1 – 5	Bayern Munich	Bochum
15:30	Fuchs 76'		Gómez 23'; Mavraj 33' (o.g.); Olić 43', 50'; Pranjić 56'	Stadium: rewirpowerSTADION; Attendance: 30,748; Referee: Florian Meyer (Burgdorf)

19 December 2009 17	Hannover 96	2 – 3	VfL Bochum	Hannover
15:30	Schlaudraff 6', 33'		Freier 51'; Epalle 54'; Fuchs 86'	Stadium: AWD-Arena; Attendance: 33,875; Referee: Knut Kircher (Rottenburg)

16 January 2010 18	Borussia Mönchengladbach	1 – 2	VfL Bochum	Mönchengladbach
15:30	Bäcker 80'		Šesták 12'; Dedić 36'	Stadium: Borussia-Park; Attendance: 36,245; Referee: Babak Rafati (Hannover)

23 January 2010 19	VfL Bochum	2 – 2	Schalke 04	Bochum
15:30	Hashemian 82'; Šesták 90+2'		Sánchez 5'; Kurányi 42'	Stadium: rewirpowerSTADION; Attendance: 29,008; Referee: Wolfgang Stark (Ergolding)

30 January 2010 20	Hertha BSC	0 – 0	VfL Bochum	Berlin
15:30				Stadium: Olympic Stadium; Attendance: 38,127; Referee: Michael Weiner (Giesen)

6 February 2010 21	VfL Bochum	1 – 1	Bayer Leverkusen	Bochum
15:30	Dedić 68'		Derdiyok 45'	Stadium: rewirpowerSTADION; Attendance: 22,176; Referee: Lutz Wagner (Kriftel)

13 February 2010 22	VfL Bochum	2 – 1	1899 Hoffenheim	Bochum
15:30	Šesták 24'; Dedić 76'		Ibišević 64'	Stadium: rewirpowerSTADION; Attendance: 17,104; Referee: Marco Fritz (Korb)

20 February 2010 23	Mainz 05	0 – 0	VfL Bochum	Mainz
15:30				Stadium: Bruchwegstadion; Attendance: 19,000; Referee: Günter Perl (Pullach)

27 February 2010 24	VfL Bochum	0 – 0	1. FC Nürnberg	Bochum
15:30				Stadium: rewirpowerSTADION; Attendance: 24,780; Referee: Peter Gagelmann (Bremen)

6 March 2010 25	VfL Wolfsburg	4 – 1	VfL Bochum	Wolfsburg
15:30	Džeko 60', 79' (pen.); Martins 75'; Santana 90+1'		Freier 28'	Stadium: Volkswagen-Arena; Attendance: 27,152; Referee: Felix Zwayer (Berlin)

13 March 2010 26	VfL Bochum	1 – 4	Borussia Dortmund	Bochum
15:30	Holtby 53'		Kehl 18'; Zidan 27'; Barrios 74', 77'	Stadium: rewirpowerSTADION; Attendance: 30,748; Referee: Wolfgang Stark (Ergolding)

20 March 2010 27	Werder Bremen	3 – 2	VfL Bochum	Bremen
15:30	Pizarro 58'; Marin 65'; Frings 81'		Šesták 14'; Dedić 63'	Stadium: Weserstadion; Attendance: 36,197; Referee: Markus Wingenbach (Diez)

26 March 2010 28	VfL Bochum	1 – 2	Eintracht Frankfurt	Bochum
20:30	Holtby 10'		Russ 29'; Caio 64'	Stadium: rewirpowerSTADION; Attendance: 24,221; Referee: Felix Brych (Munich)

3 April 2010 29	SC Freiburg	1 – 1	VfL Bochum	Freiburg
15:30	Cissé 18'		Dabrowski 23'	Stadium: Badenova-Stadion; Attendance: 21,500; Referee: Jochen Drees (Münster)

11 April 2010 30	VfL Bochum	1 – 2	Hamburger SV	Bochum
15:30	Dedić 32'		Tesche 18'; Johansson 88' (o.g.)	Stadium: rewirpowerSTADION; Attendance: 25,780; Referee: Wolfgang Stark (Ergolding)

16 April 2010 31	1. FC Köln	2 – 0	VfL Bochum	Cologne
20:30	Tošić 15', 78'			Stadium: RheinEnergieStadion; Attendance: 46,000; Referee: Peter Sippel (Munich)

23 April 2010 32	VfL Bochum	0 – 2	VfB Stuttgart	Bochum
20:30			Cacau 14'; Marica 18'	Stadium: rewirpowerSTADION; Attendance: 25,431; Referee: Peter Gagelmann (Bremen)

1 May 2010 33	Bayern Munich	3 – 1	VfL Bochum	Munich
15:30	Müller 18', 20', 69'		Fuchs 85'	Stadium: Allianz Arena; Attendance: 69,000; Referee: Markus Schmidt (Stuttgart)

8 May 2010 34	VfL Bochum	0 – 3	Hannover 96	Bochum
15:30			Bruggink 9'; Hanke 23'; Pinto 45'	Stadium: rewirpowerSTADION; Attendance: 30,748; Referee: Manuel Gräfe (Berlin)

=== DFB-Pokal ===
2 August 2009 Round 1	Sportfreunde Lotte	0 – 1	VfL Bochum	Lotte
17:30			Klimowicz 50'	Stadium: PGW Arena; Attendance: 4,408; Referee: Christian Bandurski (Oberhausen)

22 September 2009 Round 2	VfL Bochum	0 – 3	Schalke 04	Bochum
20:30			Westermann 10'; Altıntop 56'; Fuchs 76' (o.g.)	Stadium: rewirpowerSTADION; Attendance: 29,592; Referee: Florian Meyer (Burgdorf)

== Squad ==
=== Appearances and goals ===
No.	Pos	Nat	Player	Total		Bundesliga		DFB-Pokal	
No.	Pos	Nat	Player	Apps	Goals	Apps	Goals	Apps	Goals
1	GK	(Portugal) POR	Daniel Fernandes (Note: Fernandes was born in Edmonton, Canada, and represented Canada at U-20 level, but also qualified to represent the Czech Republic and Portugal internationally through his mother and father respectively and represented Portugal at U-21 level before making his international debut for Portugal in June 2007.)	1	0	1	0	0	0
2	DF	(Sweden) SWE	Matias Concha	21	0	21	0	0	0
4	DF	(Germany) GER	Marcel Maltritz	31	0	29	0	2	0
5	MF	(Germany) GER	Christoph Dabrowski (Note: Dabrowski was born in Katowice, Poland, but also qualified to represent Germany internationally and represented Germany at U-21, U-23 and B level.)	31	1	29	1	2	0
6	DF	(Austria) AUT	Christian Fuchs	33	4	31	4	2	0
7	MF	(Germany) GER	Paul Freier (Note: Freier was born in Bytom, Poland, but was raised in Germany from the age of 11 and represented Germany at U-21 level before making his international debut for Germany in May 2002.)	30	2	28	2	2	0
8	MF	(Sweden) SWE	Andreas Johansson	16	0	16	0	0	0
9	FW	(Slovakia) SVK	Stanislav Šesták	30	6	29	6	1	0
10	MF	(Cameroon) CMR	Joël Epalle	29	1	27	1	2	0
11	FW	(Slovenia) SVN	Zlatko Dedić (Note: Dedić was born in Bihać, SFR Yugoslavia (now Bosnia and Herzegovina), but was raised in what became Slovenia after Yugoslavia's dissolution and represented Slovenia at U-17, U-18, U-19, U-20 and U-21 level before making his international debut for Slovenia in August 2004.)	29	5	27	5	2	0
14	FW	(Argentina) ARG	Diego Klimowicz	17	4	15	3	2	1
15	MF	(Canada) CAN	Daniel Imhof (Note: Imhof was born in Wil, Switzerland, but was raised in Canada from the age of 4 and made his international debut for Canada in October 2000.)	8	0	6	0	2	0
16	FW	(Iran) IRN	Vahid Hashemian	26	2	25	2	1	0
17	MF	(Germany) GER	Lewis Holtby	14	2	14	2	0	0
18	GK	(Germany) GER	Philipp Heerwagen	31	0	30	0	1	0
19	MF	(Germany) GER	Dennis Grote	11	1	10	1	1	0
20	DF	(Germany) GER	Mërgim Mavraj (Note: Mavraj was born in Hanau, West Germany (now Germany), and represented Germany at U-20 and U-21 level, but also qualified to represent Albania and Kosovo internationally through his parents and made his international debut for Albania in May 2012.)	28	0	27	0	1	0
21	DF	(France) FRA	Marc Pfertzel	20	0	18	0	2	0
22	MF	(Germany) GER	Mimoun Azaouagh (Note: Azaouagh was born in Beni Sidel, Morocco, but also qualified to represent Germany internationally and represented Germany at U-21 level.)	18	3	17	3	1	0
23	MF	(Japan) JPN	Shinji Ono	10	0	9	0	1	0
23	MF	(Serbia) SRB	Miloš Marić	13	0	13	0	0	0
24	DF	(Germany) GER	Philipp Bönig	10	0	10	0	0	0
25	DF	(Algeria) ALG	Antar Yahia (Note: Yahia was born in Mulhouse, France, and represented France at U-16 and U-18 level, but also qualified to represent Algeria internationally through his parents and represented Algeria at U-23 level before making his international debut for Algeria in January 2004.)	20	1	18	1	2	0
26	GK	(Germany) GER	Andreas Luthe	4	0	3	0	1	0
27	MF	(Germany) GER	Kevin Vogt	0	0	0	0	0	0
29	FW	(Germany) GER	Roman Prokoph	15	0	15	0	0	0
30	DF	(Germany) GER	Patrick Fabian	1	0	1	0	0	0
31	GK	(Germany) GER	René Renno	0	0	0	0	0	0
32	FW	(Germany) GER	Mirkan Aydın	1	0	1	0	0	0
33	MF	(Germany) GER	Philip Semlits	0	0	0	0	0	0
34	DF	(Germany) GER	Pascal Pellowski	0	0	0	0	0	0
35	DF	(Germany) GER	Jonas Acquistapace	0	0	0	0	0	0
39	MF	(Germany) GER	Oğuzhan Kefkir	1	0	1	0	0	0

=== Minutes played ===
No.	Nat	Pos	Player	Total	Bundesliga	DFB-Pokal
1	(Portugal)	GK	Daniel Fernandes	90	90	0
2	(Sweden)	DF	Matias Concha	1611	1611	0
4	(Germany)	DF	Marcel Maltritz	2719	2552	167
5	(Germany)	MF	Christoph Dabrowski	2447	2267	180
6	(Austria)	DF	Christian Fuchs	2773	2593	180
7	(Germany)	MF	Paul Freier	1683	1568	115
8	(Sweden)	MF	Andreas Johansson	849	849	0
9	(Slovakia)	FW	Stanislav Šesták	2490	2411	79
10	(Cameroon)	MF	Joël Epalle	1967	1788	179
11	(Slovenia)	FW	Zlatko Dedić	1410	1378	32
14	(Argentina)	FW	Diego Klimowicz	1030	871	159
15	(Canada)	MF	Daniel Imhof	653	497	156
16	(Iran)	FW	Vahid Hashemian	615	591	24
17	(Germany)	MF	Lewis Holtby	1093	1093	0
18	(Germany)	GK	Philipp Heerwagen	2790	2700	90
19	(Germany)	MF	Dennis Grote	514	424	90
20	(Germany)	DF	Mërgim Mavraj	2319	2229	90
21	(France)	DF	Marc Pfertzel	1643	1540	103
22	(Germany)	MF	Mimoun Azaouagh	1164	1099	65
23	(Japan)	MF	Shinji Ono	571	570	1
23	(Serbia)	MF	Miloš Marić	1113	1113	0
24	(Germany)	DF	Philipp Bönig	817	817	0
25	(Algeria)	DF	Antar Yahia	1773	1593	180
26	(Germany)	GK	Andreas Luthe	360	270	90
27	(Germany)	MF	Kevin Vogt	0	0	0
29	(Germany)	FW	Roman Prokoph	949	949	0
30	(Germany)	DF	Patrick Fabian	55	55	0
31	(Germany)	GK	René Renno	0	0	0
32	(Germany)	FW	Mirkan Aydın	28	28	0
33	(Germany)	MF	Philip Semlits	0	0	0
34	(Germany)	DF	Pascal Pellowski	0	0	0
35	(Germany)	DF	Jonas Acquistapace	0	0	0
39	(Germany)	MF	Oğuzhan Kefkir	11	11	0

=== Bookings ===
Players				Total			Bundesliga			DFB-Pokal		
No.	Nat	Pos	Name	Booked	(yellow card) (red card)	Sent off (straight red)	Booked	(yellow card) (red card)	Sent off (straight red)	Booked	(yellow card) (red card)	Sent off (straight red)
1	(Portugal)	GK	Daniel Fernandes	0	0	0	0	0	0	0	0	0
2	(Sweden)	DF	Matias Concha	2	0	0	2	0	0	0	0	0
4	(Germany)	DF	Marcel Maltritz	4	0	0	4	0	0	0	0	0
5	(Germany)	MF	Christoph Dabrowski	7	0	0	7	0	0	0	0	0
6	(Austria)	DF	Christian Fuchs	4	0	0	3	0	0	1	0	0
7	(Germany)	MF	Paul Freier	5	0	0	3	0	0	2	0	0
8	(Sweden)	MF	Andreas Johansson	2	0	0	2	0	0	0	0	0
9	(Slovakia)	FW	Stanislav Šesták	4	0	0	4	0	0	0	0	0
10	(Cameroon)	MF	Joël Epalle	6	0	0	6	0	0	0	0	0
11	(Slovenia)	FW	Zlatko Dedić	2	0	0	2	0	0	0	0	0
14	(Argentina)	FW	Diego Klimowicz	3	0	1	2	0	1	1	0	0
15	(Canada)	MF	Daniel Imhof	3	0	0	2	0	0	1	0	0
16	(Iran)	FW	Vahid Hashemian	0	0	0	0	0	0	0	0	0
17	(Germany)	MF	Lewis Holtby	1	0	0	1	0	0	0	0	0
18	(Germany)	GK	Philipp Heerwagen	2	0	0	2	0	0	0	0	0
19	(Germany)	MF	Dennis Grote	4	0	0	3	0	0	1	0	0
20	(Germany)	DF	Mërgim Mavraj	6	0	0	6	0	0	0	0	0
21	(France)	DF	Marc Pfertzel	4	0	0	4	0	0	0	0	0
22	(Germany)	MF	Mimoun Azaouagh	5	0	0	5	0	0	0	0	0
23	(Japan)	MF	Shinji Ono	2	2	0	2	2	0	0	0	0
23	(Serbia)	MF	Miloš Marić	0	0	1	0	0	1	0	0	0
24	(Germany)	DF	Philipp Bönig	3	0	0	3	0	0	0	0	0
25	(Algeria)	DF	Antar Yahia	2	0	0	2	0	0	0	0	0
26	(Germany)	GK	Andreas Luthe	0	0	0	0	0	0	0	0	0
27	(Germany)	MF	Kevin Vogt	0	0	0	0	0	0	0	0	0
29	(Germany)	FW	Roman Prokoph	5	0	0	5	0	0	0	0	0
30	(Germany)	DF	Patrick Fabian	0	0	0	0	0	0	0	0	0
31	(Germany)	GK	René Renno	0	0	0	0	0	0	0	0	0
32	(Germany)	FW	Mirkan Aydın	1	0	0	1	0	0	0	0	0
33	(Germany)	MF	Philip Semlits	0	0	0	0	0	0	0	0	0
34	(Germany)	DF	Pascal Pellowski	0	0	0	0	0	0	0	0	0
35	(Germany)	DF	Jonas Acquistapace	0	0	0	0	0	0	0	0	0
39	(Germany)	MF	Oğuzhan Kefkir	0	0	0	0	0	0	0	0	0
Totals				77	2	2	71	2	2	6	0	0

== Transfers ==
=== Summer ===
In:

No.	Pos.	Nation	Player
8	MF	SWE	Andreas Johansson (from Halmstad)
11	FW	SVN	Zlatko Dedić (from Frosinone)
26	GK	GER	Andreas Luthe (from VfL Bochum II)
27	MF	GER	Kevin Vogt (from VfL Bochum Youth)
30	DF	GER	Patrick Fabian (from VfL Bochum II)

Out:

No.	Pos.	Nation	Player
11	FW	POL	Marcin Mięciel (to Legia Warszawa)
17	FW	TUR	Sinan Kaloğlu (to Vitesse)
18	MF	GER	Oliver Schröder (to Hansa Rostock)
26	MF	KAZ	Heinrich Schmidtgal (to Rot-Weiss Oberhausen)
27	GK	GER	Andreas Lengsfeld (released)
28	MF	POL	David Zajas (to SSVg Velbert)
29	FW	GER	Dilaver Güçlü (to Manisaspor)
—	MF	GER	Danny Fuchs (to 1. FC Kaiserslautern, previously on loan)
—	MF	CRO	Ivo Iličević (Note: Iličević was born in Aschaffenburg, West Germany (now Germany), but also qualified to represent Croatia internationally and represented Croatia at U-21 level before making his international debut for Croatia in October 2010.) (on loan to 1. FC Kaiserslautern, previously on loan at SpVgg Greuther Fürth)

=== Winter ===
In:

No.	Pos.	Nation	Player
17	MF	GER	Lewis Holtby (on loan from Schalke 04)
28	MF	SRB	Miloš Marić (from Gent)
29	FW	GER	Roman Prokoph (from VfL Bochum II)
32	FW	GER	Mirkan Aydın (from VfL Bochum II)

Out:

No.	Pos.	Nation	Player
1	GK	POR	Daniel Fernandes (on loan to Iraklis)
15	MF	CAN	Daniel Imhof (to FC St. Gallen)
23	MF	JPN	Shinji Ono (to Shimizu S-Pulse)
