= Andreas Luthe =

German footballer

Personal information
- Date of birth: 10 March 1987 (age 39)
- Place of birth: Velbert, West Germany
- Height: 1.97 m (6 ft 6 in)
- Position: Goalkeeper

Youth career
- 1994–1997: SuS Niederbonsfeld
- 1997–2001: Borussia Velbert
- 2001–2006: VfL Bochum

Senior career*
Years	Team	Apps	(Gls)
2006–2014	VfL Bochum II	76	(0)
2009–2016	VfL Bochum	157	(0)
2016–2020	FC Augsburg	29	(0)
2016–2017	FC Augsburg II	1	(0)
2020–2022	Union Berlin	58	(0)
2022–2024	1. FC Kaiserslautern	33	(0)
2024	VfL Bochum	1	(0)
Total		353	(0)
- * Club domestic league appearances and goals

Andreas Luthe (born 10 March 1987) is a German former professional footballer who played as a goalkeeper.

== Career ==
Luthe began his career with SuS Niederbonsfeld and later moved to Borussia Velbert, where he was scouted by VfL Bochum in 2001. He was promoted to Bochum's second team in 2006, for which he played 75 matches until 2010.

Prior to the 2009–10 season, Luthe signed a professional contract with Bochum and became a part of the first team squad as a backup goalkeeper. He made his debut for the first team on 22 September 2009 in the DFB Cup, replacing the injured first-choice goalkeeper Philipp Heerwagen. His Bundesliga debut followed on 25 September 2009 against 1. FC Nürnberg, in which he kept a clean sheet in his team's 1-0 win. After two more league appearances, he returned to the bench. At the end of the season, Bochum were relegated to the 2. Bundesliga. After Heerwagen had made a number of mistakes in the first four matchdays of the 2010–11 season, Luthe became the team's first-choice keeper starting on matchday five. He was named Bochum's new captain at the start of the 2012-13 season.

After a successful start to the 2015–16 season, Bochum only won two points on the matchdays 11 to 16, with Luthe not keeping a clean sheet in any of these games. Bochum head coach Gertjan Verbeek reacted by making changes to the team and withdrew Luthe from the starting eleven for the match against 1. FC Heidenheim on 6 December 2015, he was replaced with Manuel Riemann. Luthe reacted to this decision the day before the match by publicly criticising it on Facebook, stating that he "remained without any serious mistakes in all 16 league matches". While his statement was deleted after a short time, the club announced on 8 December 2015 that Luthe would be suspended from playing and training until 3 January 2016. Luthe accepted this decision and stated that he had underestimated the impact of his comments. Even after his suspension ended, Luthe was not called up to the matchday squad until the end of the season.

Luthe moved to Bundesliga club FC Augsburg for the 2016–17 season, where he signed a contract until 2020. He made his competitive debut in the 1-1 draw against Borussia Dortmund on 13 May 2017, after first-choice goalkeeper Marwin Hitz was ruled out for the game with a hip injury. After Hitz left Augsburg in the summer of 2018, Luthe became Augsburg's new first-choice goalkeeper. In the second half of the 2018–19 season, in which Augsburg was fighting relegation, he lost his place in the goal to Gregor Kobel, who had been signed on loan in the winter transfer window. After successfully avoiding relegation, Augsburg signed Tomáš Koubek prior to the 2019–20 season, who was chosen as the new first-choice goalkeeper by coach Martin Schmidt. However, Koubek made several mistakes during the season, which ultimately prompted Schmidt and his successor Heiko Herrlich to rely on Luthe again from the beginning of March 2020. As Koubek had a long-term contract at Augsburg and another goalkeeper, Rafał Gikiewicz, was signed in summer 2020, Luthe moved to Bundesliga rivals 1. FC Union Berlin prior to the 2020–21 season. He was the starting goalkeeper there and was able to assert himself against Loris Karius.

Luthe returned to the 2. Bundesliga for the 2022–23 season and moved to newly promoted side 1. FC Kaiserslautern, where he was the first-choice goalkeeper in his first season. After receiving a red card on the second matchday of the following season, he lost his place in the starting eleven to Julian Krahl.

In January 2024, Luthe returned to VfL Bochum, where he had already played as a youth player and professional until 2016, and signed a contract until the end of the season. He served as the second goalkeeper behind Manuel Riemann. After Bochum dropped to the relegation play-off spot on the final matchday, the club announced that Riemann would not be included in the squad for the two relegation matches against Fortuna Düsseldorf. Luthe played in both legs of the relegation play-offs and helped his team to avoid relegation by saving a penalty in the penalty shoot-out of the second leg. After winning the play-off and avoiding relegation on 27 May 2024, Luthe announced his retirement from professional football.

== Career statistics ==
Appearances by club, season and competition
Club	Season	League			DFB-Pokal		Europe		Other		Total	
Club	Season	Division	Apps	Goals	Apps	Goals	Apps	Goals	Apps	Goals	Apps	Goals
VfL Bochum II	2005–06	Oberliga Westfalen	2	0	—		—		—		2	0
VfL Bochum II	2006–07	Oberliga Westfalen	34	0	—		—		—		34	0
VfL Bochum II	2007–08	Oberliga Westfalen	8	0	—		—		—		8	0
VfL Bochum II	2008–09	Regionalliga West	21	0	—		—		—		21	0
VfL Bochum II	2009–10	Regionalliga West	9	0	—		—		—		9	0
VfL Bochum II	2010–11	Regionalliga West	1	0	—		—		—		1	0
VfL Bochum II	2014–15	Regionalliga West	1	0	—		—		—		1	0
VfL Bochum II	Total		76	0	—		—		—		76	0
VfL Bochum	2009–10	Bundesliga	3	0	1	0	—		—		4	0
VfL Bochum	2010–11	2. Bundesliga	30	0	0	0	—		2 (Note: Appearances in the 2. Bundesliga promotion play-offs)	0	32	0
VfL Bochum	2011–12	2. Bundesliga	33	0	3	0	—		—		36	0
VfL Bochum	2012–13	2. Bundesliga	25	0	2	0	—		—		27	0
VfL Bochum	2013–14	2. Bundesliga	32	0	2	0	—		—		34	0
VfL Bochum	2014–15	2. Bundesliga	18	0	2	0	—		—		20	0
VfL Bochum	2015–16	2. Bundesliga	16	0	0	0	—		—		16	0
VfL Bochum	Total		157	0	10	0	—		2	0	169	0
FC Augsburg II	2016–17	Regionalliga Bayern	1	0	—		—		—		1	0
FC Augsburg	2016–17	Bundesliga	2	0	0	0	—		—		2	0
FC Augsburg	2017–18	Bundesliga	2	0	0	0	—		—		2	0
FC Augsburg	2018–19	Bundesliga	15	0	2	0	—		—		17	0
FC Augsburg	2019–20	Bundesliga	10	0	0	0	—		—		10	0
FC Augsburg	Total		29	0	2	0	—		—		31	0
Union Berlin	2020–21	Bundesliga	31	0	1	0	—		—		32	0
Union Berlin	2021–22	Bundesliga	27	0	2	0	5 (Note: Appearances in the UEFA Europa Conference League)	0	—		34	0
Union Berlin	Total		58	0	3	0	5	0	—		66	0
Kaiserslautern	2022–23	2. Bundesliga	31	0	1	0	—		—		32	0
VfL Bochum	2023–24	Bundesliga	1	0	2	0	—		2 (Note: Appearances in Bundesliga relegation play-offs)	0	5	0
Career total			353	0	18	0	5	0	4	0	380	0
