= 2020–21 1. FC Union Berlin season =

Union Berlin
2020–21 season
- Chairman: Dirk Zingler
- Manager: Urs Fischer
- Stadium: Stadion An der Alten Försterei
- Bundesliga: 7th
- DFB-Pokal: Second round
- Top goalscorer: League: Max Kruse (11); All: Max Kruse (11)
- Biggest win: Union Berlin 5–0 Arminia Bielefeld
- Biggest defeat: Eintracht Frankfurt 5–2 Union Berlin; VfL Wolfsburg 3–0 Union Berlin
Home colours	Away colours	Third colours

The 2020–21 1. FC Union Berlin season was the club's 56th season in existence and the second consecutive season in the top flight of German football, the Bundesliga. They also participated in the DFB-Pokal. The season covered the period from 1 July 2020 to 30 June 2021.

== Players ==
=== First-team squad ===
As of 16 January 2021

Note: Flags indicate national team as defined under FIFA eligibility rules; some limited exceptions apply. Players may hold more than one non-FIFA nationality.

No.	Pos.	Nation	Player
1	GK	GER	Andreas Luthe
4	DF	GER	Nico Schlotterbeck (on loan from SC Freiburg)
5	DF	GER	Marvin Friedrich
6	MF	NOR	Julian Ryerson
7	MF	GER	Akaki Gogia
9	FW	FIN	Joel Pohjanpalo (on loan from Bayer Leverkusen)
10	FW	GER	Max Kruse
11	FW	NGR	Anthony Ujah
12	GK	DEN	Jakob Busk
14	FW	NGR	Taiwo Awoniyi (on loan from Liverpool)
15	FW	GER	Marius Bülter
16	MF	GER	Tim Maciejewski
18	MF	JPN	Keita Endo (on loan from Yokohama Marinos)
19	DF	GER	Florian Hübner

No.	Pos.	Nation	Player
20	GK	GER	Loris Karius (on loan from Liverpool)
21	MF	GER	Grischa Prömel
23	DF	GER	Niko Gießelmann
25	DF	GER	Christopher Lenz
27	FW	NED	Sheraldo Becker
28	DF	AUT	Christopher Trimmel (Captain)
30	MF	GER	Robert Andrich
31	DF	GER	Robin Knoche
32	FW	DEN	Marcus Ingvartsen
33	MF	GER	Sebastian Griesbeck
34	MF	GER	Christian Gentner
35	GK	GER	Lennart Moser
36	FW	GER	Cedric Teuchert
—	MF	GER	Leon Dajaku (on loan from Bayern Munich)

== Transfers ==
=== In ===
Date	Pos	Player	From	Fee	Ref.
	FW	Marius Bülter (GER)	1. FC Magdeburg	€1,400,000	
	FW	Cedric Teuchert (GER)	Schalke 04	Free	
	FW	Max Kruse (GER)	Fenerbahçe (TUR)	End of contract (terminated)	
	DF	Niko Gießelmann (GER)	Fortuna Düsseldorf	End of contract	
	MF	Sebastian Griesbeck (GER)	1. FC Heidenheim	End of contract	
	DF	Robin Knoche (GER)	VfL Wolfsburg	End of contract	
	GK	Andreas Luthe (GER)	FC Augsburg	End of contract	
	MF	Keita Endo (JPN)	Yokohama Marinos (JPN)	€300,000	

=== Loans in ===
Date from	Pos	Player	From	Date until	Ref.
31 July 2020	DF	Nico Schlotterbeck (GER)	SC Freiburg	End of season	
19 September 2020	FW	Taiwo Awoniyi (NGA)	Liverpool (ENG)	End of season	
28 September 2020	GK	Loris Karius (GER)	Liverpool (ENG)	End of season	
30 September 2020	FW	Joel Pohjanpalo (FIN)	Bayer Leverkusen	End of season	
15 January 2021	MF	Leon Dajaku (GER)	Bayern Munich	End of season	

=== Out ===
Date	Pos	Player	To	Fee	Ref.
5 August 2020	MF	Julius Kade (GER)	Dynamo Dresden	Free	
8 August 2020	MF	Florian Flecker (AUT)	Würzburger Kickers	Free	
15 September 2020	FW	Sebastian Andersson (SWE)	1. FC Köln	€6,000,000	
18 September 2020	DF	Neven Subotić (SRB)	Denizlispor (TUR)	Free	
5 October 2020	MF	Lars Dietz (GER)	Würzburger Kickers	Free	
	MF	Joshua Mees (GER)	Holstein Kiel	Free	
	DF	Lennard Maloney (GER)	Borussia Dortmund II	Free	
	MF	Berkan Taz (GER)	SC Verl	Free	
	GK	Rafal Gikiewicz (POL)	FC Augsburg	End of contract	
	MF	Felix Kroos (GER)	Eintracht Braunschweig	End of contract	
	GK	Leo Oppermann (GER)	Hamburger SV II	End of contract	
	FW	Sebastian Polter (GER)	Fortuna Sittard (NED)	End of contract	
	DF	Ken Reichel (GER)	VfL Osnabrück	End of contract	
	MF	Manuel Schmiedebach (GER)	Free agent	End of contract	
	DF	Michael Parensen (GER)	–	Retired	

=== Loans out ===
Date from	Pos	Player	To	Date until	Ref.
31 July 2020	MF	Laurenz Dehl (GER)	Hallescher FC	End of season	
16 August 2020	MF	Suleiman Abdullahi (NGR)	Eintracht Braunschweig	End of season	

== Pre-season and friendlies ==
Win Draw Loss

12 August 2020 Friendly	Union Berlin	2–0	Würzburger Kickers	Berlin, Germany
15:00 CEST (UTC+2)	Hübner 38'; Teuchert 65'	Report		Stadium: Stadion An der Alten Försterei; Attendance: 0 (Note: Match played behind closed doors)

22 August 2020 Friendly	1. FC Köln	2–1	Union Berlin	Friedrichshafen, Germany
17:30 CEST (UTC+2)	Katterbach 11'; Córdoba 12'; Czichos (yellow card) 23'	Report	Teuchert 51' (pen.)	Stadium: Zeppelinstadion; Attendance: 300; Referee: Max Bruda

30 August 2020 Friendly	Ajax	2–2	Union Berlin	Amsterdam, Netherlands
13:00 CEST (UTC+2)	Traoré (yellow card) 23'; Eiting 27'; Ekkelenkamp 69'	Report	Ingvartsen 48'; Bülter 57'; Gießelmann (yellow card) 60'	Stadium: Johan Cruyff Arena

8 October 2020 Friendly	Union Berlin	4–1	Hannover 96	Berlin, Germany
17:20 CEST (UTC+2)	Gogia 27' (pen.); Bülter 69'; Teuchert 72', 75'	Report	Sulejmani 49'	Stadium: Stadion An der Alten Försterei; Attendance: 1,759

25 March 2021 Friendly	Union Berlin	1–2	Eintracht Braunschweig	Berlin, Germany
15:00 CET (UTC+1)	Bülter 74'	Report	Abdullahi 19', 37'	Stadium: Stadion An der Alten Försterei; Attendance: 0

== Competitions ==
=== Overview ===
Competition	First match	Last match	Starting round	Final position	Record							
Competition	First match	Last match	Starting round	Final position	Pld	W	D	L	GF	GA	GD	Win %
Bundesliga	19 September 2020	22 May 2021	Matchday 1	7th	34	12	14	8	50	43	+7	35.29
DFB-Pokal	12 September 2020	22 December 2020	First round	Second round	2	1	0	1	3	3	+0	50.00
Total					36	13	14	9	53	46	+7	36.11

Last updated: 22 May 2021
Source: Soccerway

=== Bundesliga ===
==== League table ====
Pos	Team	Pld	W	D	L	GF	GA	GD	Pts	Qualification or relegation
5	Eintracht Frankfurt	34	16	12	6	69	53	+16	60	Qualification for the Europa League group stage (Note: Since the winners of the 2020–21 DFB-Pokal, Borussia Dortmund, qualified for the Champions League based on league position, the Europa League group stage spot was passed to the sixth-placed team, and the Europa Conference League play-off round spot was passed to the seventh-placed team.)
6	Bayer Leverkusen	34	14	10	10	53	39	+14	52	Qualification for the Europa League group stage
7	Union Berlin	34	12	14	8	50	43	+7	50	Qualification for the Europa Conference League play-off round
8	Borussia Mönchengladbach	34	13	10	11	64	56	+8	49	
9	VfB Stuttgart	34	12	9	13	56	55	+1	45	

Source: DFB
Rules for classification: 1) Points; 2) Goal difference; 3) Goals scored; 4) Head-to-head results; 5) Head-to-head away goals scored; 6) Away goals scored; 7) Play-off.

==== Results summary ====
Overall								Home						Away					
Pld	W	D	L	GF	GA	GD	Pts	W	D	L	GF	GA	GD	W	D	L	GF	GA	GD
34	12	14	8	50	43	+7	50	8	8	1	32	18	+14	4	6	7	18	25	−7

Last updated: 22 May 2021.
Source: DFB

==== Results by round ====
Round	1	2	3	4	5	6	7	8	9	10	11	12	13	14	15	16	17	18	19	20	21	22	23	24	25	26	27	28	29	30	31	32	33	34
Ground	H	A	H	A	H	A	H	A	H	A	H	A	H	A	H	H	A	A	H	A	H	A	H	A	H	A	H	A	H	A	H	A	A	H
Result	L	D	W	D	D	W	W	W	D	L	D	D	W	W	D	W	L	L	D	L	D	W	D	D	W	L	D	D	W	L	W	L	D	W
Position	14	14	9	10	12	7	5	5	6	6	6	6	6	5	5	5	6	8	8	9	9	7	7	7	7	7	7	7	8	8	8	8	7	7

Updated to match(es) played on 22 May 2021. Source: DFB
A = Away; H = Home; W = Win; D = Draw; L = Loss

==== Matches ====
The league fixtures were announced on 7 August 2020.

19 September 2020 1	Union Berlin	1–3	FC Augsburg	Berlin
15:30 CEST (UTC+2)	Trimmel (yellow card) 9'; Griesbeck (yellow card) 62'; Bülter 75'	Report	Vargas 41'; Gregoritsch 82'; Hahn 89'	Stadium: Stadion An der Alten Försterei; Attendance: 4,600; Referee: Marco Fritz

26 September 2020 2	Borussia Mönchengladbach	1–1	Union Berlin	Mönchengladbach
15:30 CEST (UTC+2)	Bensebaini (yellow card) 11'; Thuram 56'	Report	Trimmel (yellow card) 64'; Schlotterbeck 80'; Andrich (yellow card) 90+2'	Stadium: Borussia-Park; Attendance: 10,383; Referee: Tobias Stieler

2 October 2020 3	Union Berlin	4–0	Mainz 05	Berlin
20:30 CEST (UTC+2)	Kruse 13'; Trimmel (yellow card) 33'; Ingvartsen 49'; Friedrich 63'; Pohjanpalo 64'	Report	Mateta (yellow card) 54'; Latza (yellow card) 59'; Boëtius (yellow card) 67'; St. Juste (yellow card) 78'	Stadium: Stadion An der Alten Försterei; Attendance: 4,400; Referee: Sascha Stegemann

18 October 2020 4	Schalke 04	1–1	Union Berlin	Gelsenkirchen
18:00 CEST (UTC+2)	Paciência 69', (yellow card) 77'; Skrzybski (yellow card) 71'; Harit (yellow card) 83'	Report	Friedrich 55'; Prömel (yellow card) 74'	Stadium: Veltins-Arena; Attendance: 300; Referee: Patrick Ittrich

24 October 2020 5	Union Berlin	1–1	SC Freiburg	Berlin
15:30 CEST (UTC+2)	Andrich 36'; Ingvartsen (yellow card) 39'	Report	Grifo 34'; Tempelmann (yellow card) 69'; Sallai (yellow card) 77'; Lienhart (yellow card) 80'; Höfler (yellow card) 88'	Stadium: Stadion An der Alten Försterei; Attendance: 4,500; Referee: Robert Schröder

2 November 2020 6	1899 Hoffenheim	1–3	Union Berlin	Sinsheim
20:30 CET (UTC+1)	Skov (red card) 58'; Dabbur 80'; Baumgartner (yellow card) 90'	Report	Kruse 59' (pen.); Luthe (yellow card) 63'; Griesbeck (yellow card) 71'; Pohjanpalo 85'; Teuchert 90+4'	Stadium: Rhein-Neckar-Arena; Attendance: 0 Referee: Robert Hartmann

7 November 2020 7	Union Berlin	5–0	Arminia Bielefeld	Berlin
15:30 CET (UTC+1)	Endo 3'; Andrich 13'; Becker 45+2'; Kruse 52' (pen.); Teuchert 89'	Report	Van der Hoorn (yellow card) 59'	Stadium: Stadion An der Alten Försterei; Attendance: 0 Referee: Matthias Jöllenbeck

22 November 2020 8	1. FC Köln	1–2	Union Berlin	Cologne
18:00 CET (UTC+1)	Duda (yellow card) 31'; Skhiri 36'	Report	Awoniyi 27'; Ingvartsen (yellow card) 35'; Kruse (penalty missed) 72', 72'; Gießelmann (yellow card) 90+4'	Stadium: RheinEnergieStadion; Attendance: 0 Referee: Tobias Stieler

28 November 2020 9	Union Berlin	3–3	Eintracht Frankfurt	Berlin
15:30 CET (UTC+1)	Andrich 2'; Kruse 6' (pen.), 82'; Prömel (yellow card) 57'; Lenz (yellow card) 61'	Report	Silva 27', 37'; Sow (yellow card) 59'; Ndicka (yellow card) 62'; Dost 79'; Ilsanker (yellow card) 81'	Stadium: Stadion An der Alten Försterei; Attendance: 0 Referee: Tobias Reichel

4 December 2020 10	Hertha BSC	3–1	Union Berlin	Berlin
20:30 CET (UTC+1)	Pekarík 51'; Piątek 74', 77'; Cunha (yellow card) 84'	Report	Awoniyi 20'; Andrich (red card) 23'; Trimmel (yellow card) 36'; Ryerson (yellow card) 52'; Lenz (yellow card) 64'	Stadium: Olympiastadion; Attendance: 0 Referee: Felix Brych

12 December 2020 11	Union Berlin	1–1	Bayern Munich	Berlin
18:30 CET (UTC+1)	Prömel 4', (yellow card) 72'; Knoche (yellow card) 45'; Becker (yellow card) 79'	Report	Davies (yellow card) 30'; Gnabry (yellow card) 37'; Lewandowski 68'	Stadium: Stadion An der Alten Försterei; Attendance: 0 Referee: Bastian Dankert

15 December 2020 12	VfB Stuttgart	2–2	Union Berlin	Stuttgart
20:30 CET (UTC+1)	Mavropanos (yellow card) 4'; Klimowicz (yellow card) 31'; González (yellow card) 56'; Kalajdžić 85', 90'	Report	Friedrich 4'; Prömel (yellow card) 35'; Griesbeck (yellow card) 55'; Awoniyi 77'; Gogia (yellow card) 90+3'	Stadium: Mercedes-Benz Arena; Attendance: 0 Referee: Sascha Stegemann

18 December 2020 13	Union Berlin	2–1	Borussia Dortmund	Berlin
20:30 CET (UTC+1)	Awoniyi 57'; Bülter (yellow card) 62'; Friedrich 78'	Report	Moukoko 60'; Witsel (yellow card) 67'	Stadium: Stadion An der Alten Försterei; Attendance: 0 Referee: Harm Osmers

2 January 2021 14	Werder Bremen	0–2	Union Berlin	Bremen
15:30 CET (UTC+1)	Groß (yellow card) 33'; Selke (yellow card) 53'	Report	Becker 12', (yellow card) 68'; Andrich (yellow card) 25'; Awoniyi 28'; Prömel (yellow card) 44'; Hübner (yellow card) 50'	Stadium: Weser-Stadion; Attendance: 0 Referee: Tobias Stieler

9 January 2021 15	Union Berlin	2–2	VfL Wolfsburg	Berlin
15:30 CET (UTC+1)	Becker 29'; Andrich 52'; Ingvartsen (yellow card) 65'; Hübner (yellow card) 70'; Knoche (yellow card) 90+1'	Report	Steffen 10'; Arnold (red card) 50'; Weghorst (yellow card) 57', (goal) 65' (pen.)	Stadium: Stadion An der Alten Försterei; Attendance: 0 Referee: Patrick Ittrich

15 January 2021 16	Union Berlin	1–0	Bayer Leverkusen	Berlin
20:30 CET (UTC+1)	Friedrich (yellow card) 52'; Teuchert 88'	Report	Tah (yellow card) 43'; Amiri (yellow card) 90+1'	Stadium: Stadion An der Alten Försterei; Attendance: 0 Referee: Florian Badstübner

20 January 2021 17	RB Leipzig	1–0	Union Berlin	Leipzig
20:30 CET (UTC+1)	Angeliño (yellow card) 66'; Forsberg 70'	Report	Gießelmann (yellow card) 89'	Stadium: Red Bull Arena; Attendance: 0 Referee: Markus Schmidt

23 January 2021 18	FC Augsburg	2–1	Union Berlin	Augsburg
15:30 CET (UTC+1)	Niederlechner 17', 47', (yellow card) 55'; Strobl (yellow card) 45'; Oxford (yellow card) 49'	Report	Ingvartsen 25', (penalty missed) 56'; Trimmel (yellow card) 67'	Stadium: WWK Arena; Attendance: 0 Referee: Felix Brych

30 January 2021 19	Union Berlin	1–1	Borussia Mönchengladbach	Berlin
15:30 CET (UTC+1)	Knoche 31'; Schlotterbeck (yellow card) 71'	Report	Kramer (yellow card) 8'; Zakaria (yellow card) 45'; Pléa 59'; Neuhaus (yellow card) 63'	Stadium: Stadion An der Alten Försterei; Attendance: 0 Referee: Bastian Dankert

6 February 2021 20	Mainz 05	1–0	Union Berlin	Mainz
15:30 CET (UTC+1)	Niakhaté 22' (pen.); Kohr (yellow card) 28'; Barreiro (yellow card) 40'	Report	Schlotterbeck (yellow card) 21' (yellow-red card) 55'; Teuchert (yellow card) 33'; Knoche (yellow card) 60'; Trimmel (yellow card) 67'	Stadium: Opel Arena; Attendance: 0 Referee: Sascha Stegemann

13 February 2021 21	Union Berlin	0–0	Schalke 04	Berlin
18:30 CET (UTC+1)	Trimmel (yellow card) 2'; Hübner (yellow card) 75'; Musa (yellow card) 82'	Report	William (yellow card) 34'; Harit (yellow card) 85'	Stadium: Stadion An der Alten Försterei; Attendance: 0 Referee: Daniel Schlager

20 February 2021 22	SC Freiburg	0–1	Union Berlin	Freiburg
15:30 CET (UTC+1)	Grifo (yellow card) 37'; Höler (yellow card) 50'	Report	Lenz (yellow card) 39'; Prömel 64'; Gießelmann (yellow card) 85'	Stadium: Schwarzwald-Stadion; Attendance: 0 Referee: Sören Storks

28 February 2021 23	Union Berlin	1–1	1899 Hoffenheim	Berlin
13:30 CET (UTC+1)	Kruse 9' (pen.)	Report	Schlotterbeck 29' (o.g.); Richards (yellow card) 79'; Vogt (yellow card) 90+4'	Stadium: Stadion An der Alten Försterei; Attendance: 0 Referee: Tobias Stieler

7 March 2021 24	Arminia Bielefeld	0–0	Union Berlin	Bielefeld
18:00 CET (UTC+1)		Report		Stadium: Bielefelder Alm; Attendance: 0 Referee: Harm Osmers

13 March 2021 25	Union Berlin	2–1	1. FC Köln	Berlin
15:30 CET (UTC+1)	Musa (yellow card) 32'; Kruse 48' (pen.); Trimmel 67'; Andrich (yellow card) 87'	Report	Horn (yellow card) 11'; Duda 45+2' (pen.); Özcan (yellow card) 81'; Skhiri (yellow card) 85'	Stadium: Stadion An der Alten Försterei; Attendance: 0 Referee: Deniz Aytekin

20 March 2021 26	Eintracht Frankfurt	5–2	Union Berlin	Frankfurt
15:30 CET (UTC+1)	Silva 2', 41'; Andrich 35' (o.g.); Kostić 39'; Hasebe (yellow card) 72'; Chandler 90+2'	Report	Kruse 7', 45+3'; Teuchert (yellow card) 86'; Andrich (yellow card) 89'	Stadium: Deutsche Bank Park; Attendance: 0 Referee: Markus Schmidt

4 April 2021 27	Union Berlin	1–1	Hertha BSC	Berlin
18:00 CEST (UTC+2)	Andrich 10'; Ryerson (yellow card) 17'; Prömel (yellow card) 28'	Report	Guendouzi (yellow card) 28'; Lukebakio 35' (pen.); Tousart (yellow card) 45'; Torunarigha (yellow card) 53'; Ascacíbar (yellow card) 77'	Stadium: Stadion An der Alten Försterei; Attendance: 0 Referee: Sascha Stegemann

10 April 2021 28	Bayern Munich	1–1	Union Berlin	Munich
15:30 CEST (UTC+2)	Musiala 68'; Sarr (yellow card) 76'; Nianzou (yellow card) 83'	Report	Ingvartsen 86'	Stadium: Allianz Arena; Attendance: 0 Referee: Tobias Stieler

17 April 2021 29	Union Berlin	2–1	VfB Stuttgart	Berlin
15:30 CEST (UTC+2)	Prömel (yellow card) 9', (goal) 20'; Musa 43'; Trimmel (yellow card) 83'	Report	Coulibaly (yellow card) 30'; Förster 49'; Karazor (yellow card) 51'; Mavropanos (yellow card) 90+2'	Stadium: Stadion An der Alten Försterei; Attendance: 0 Referee: Benjamin Cortus

21 April 2021 30	Borussia Dortmund	2–0	Union Berlin	Dortmund
20:30 CEST (UTC+2)	Haaland (penalty missed) 27'; Reus 27'; Bellingham (yellow card) 70'; Hummels (yellow card) 72'; Guerreiro 88'	Report	Knoche (yellow card) 48'	Stadium: Signal Iduna Park; Attendance: 0 Referee: Daniel Schlager

24 April 2021 31	Union Berlin	3–1	Werder Bremen	Berlin
15:30 CEST (UTC+2)	Pohjanpalo 50', 53', 67'	Report	Gebre Selassie 82'	Stadium: Stadion An der Alten Försterei; Attendance: 0 Referee: Patrick Ittrich

8 May 2021 32	VfL Wolfsburg	3–0	Union Berlin	Wolfsburg
15:30 CEST (UTC+2)	Brekalo 12', 63', 90'; Mbabu (yellow card) 31'	Report		Stadium: Volkswagen Arena; Attendance: 0 Referee: Sven Jablonski

15 May 2021 33	Bayer Leverkusen	1–1	Union Berlin	Leverkusen
15:30 CEST (UTC+2)	Amiri (yellow card) 6'; Tapsoba (yellow card) 17'; Wirtz 27'	Report	Ingvartsen (yellow card) 40'; Andrich (yellow card) 55'; Pohjanpalo 72'	Stadium: BayArena; Attendance: 0 Referee: Patrick Ittrich

22 May 2021 34	Union Berlin	2–1	RB Leipzig	Berlin
15:30 CEST (UTC+2)	Trimmel (yellow card) 53'; Friedrich 67'; Schlotterbeck (yellow card) 76'; Kruse 90+2'	Report	Sabitzer (yellow card) 25'; Kluivert 55'	Stadium: Stadion An der Alten Försterei; Attendance: 2,000; Referee: Guido Winkmann

=== DFB-Pokal ===
12 September 2020 First round	Karlsruher SC	0–1 (a.e.t.)	Union Berlin	Karlsruhe
18:30 CEST (UTC+2)	Gondorf (yellow card) 27'; Fröde (yellow card) 111'; Groiß (yellow card) 117'	Report	Schlotterbeck (yellow card) 45', (goal) 117'; Friedrich (yellow card) 58'; Prömel (yellow card) 99'; Trimmel (yellow card) 102'	Stadium: Wildparkstadion; Attendance: 450; Referee: Benjamin Cortus

22 December 2020 Second round	Union Berlin	2–3	SC Paderborn	Berlin
20:45 CET (UTC+1)	Prömel 6'; Hünemeier 57' (o.g.)	Report	Michel 3', 36'; Srbeny 31'; Dörfler (yellow card) 63'; Schonlau (yellow card) 90'	Stadium: Stadion An der Alten Försterei; Attendance: 0 Referee: Frank Willenborg

== Statistics ==
=== Appearances and goals ===
No.	Pos	Nat	Player	Total		Bundesliga		DFB-Pokal	
No.	Pos	Nat	Player	Apps	Goals	Apps	Goals	Apps	Goals
Goalkeepers
1	GK	(Germany) GER	Andreas Luthe	21	0	20	0	1	0
12	GK	(Denmark) DEN	Jakob Busk	0	0	0	0	0	0
20	GK	(Germany) GER	Loris Karius	3	0	1+1	0	1	0
	GK	(Germany) GER	Nikolai Kemlein	0	0	0	0	0	0
Defenders
4	DF	(Germany) GER	Nico Schlotterbeck	6	2	5	1	1	1
5	DF	(Germany) GER	Marvin Friedrich	23	4	21	4	2	0
19	DF	(Germany) GER	Florian Hübner	6	0	6	0	0	0
23	DF	(Germany) GER	Niko Gießelmann	13	0	4+7	0	1+1	0
25	DF	(Germany) GER	Christopher Lenz	19	0	18	0	1	0
28	DF	(Austria) AUT	Christopher Trimmel	20	0	18	0	2	0
31	DF	(Germany) GER	Robin Knoche	23	1	21	1	2	0
Midfielders
6	MF	(Norway) NOR	Julian Ryerson	17	0	4+11	0	0+2	0
7	MF	(Germany) GER	Akaki Gogia	8	0	0+7	0	0+1	0
18	MF	(Japan) JPN	Keita Endo	9	1	1+7	1	1	0
21	MF	(Germany) GER	Grischa Prömel	16	2	12+2	1	2	1
30	MF	(Germany) GER	Robert Andrich	20	4	18	4	1+1	0
33	MF	(Germany) GER	Sebastian Griesbeck	19	0	7+10	0	0+2	0
34	MF	(Germany) GER	Christian Gentner	12	0	7+4	0	1	0
Forwards
8	FW	(Germany) GER	Leon Dajaku	2	0	0+2	0	0	0
9	FW	(Finland) FIN	Joel Pohjanpalo	8	2	4+4	2	0	0
10	FW	(Germany) GER	Max Kruse	10	6	8+2	6	0	0
11	FW	(Nigeria) NGR	Anthony Ujah	0	0	0	0	0	0
14	FW	(Nigeria) NGR	Taiwo Awoniyi	20	5	16+3	5	1	0
15	FW	(Germany) GER	Marius Bülter	18	1	5+11	1	1+1	0
24	FW	(Croatia) CRO	Petar Musa	2	0	0+2	0	0	0
27	FW	(Netherlands) NED	Sheraldo Becker	18	3	15+1	3	1+1	0
32	FW	(Denmark) DEN	Marcus Ingvartsen	18	2	15+2	2	1	0
36	FW	(Germany) GER	Cedric Teuchert	19	3	5+12	3	2	0
Players transferred out during the season
35	GK	(Germany) GER	Lennart Moser	0	0	0	0	0	0
8	FW	(Germany) GER	Joshua Mees	2	0	0+1	0	0+1	0
16	FW	(Germany) GER	Tim Maciejewski	1	0	0+1	0	0	0

Last updated: 13 February 2021
Source: Soccerway
