= Kevin Vogt =

German footballer (born 1991)

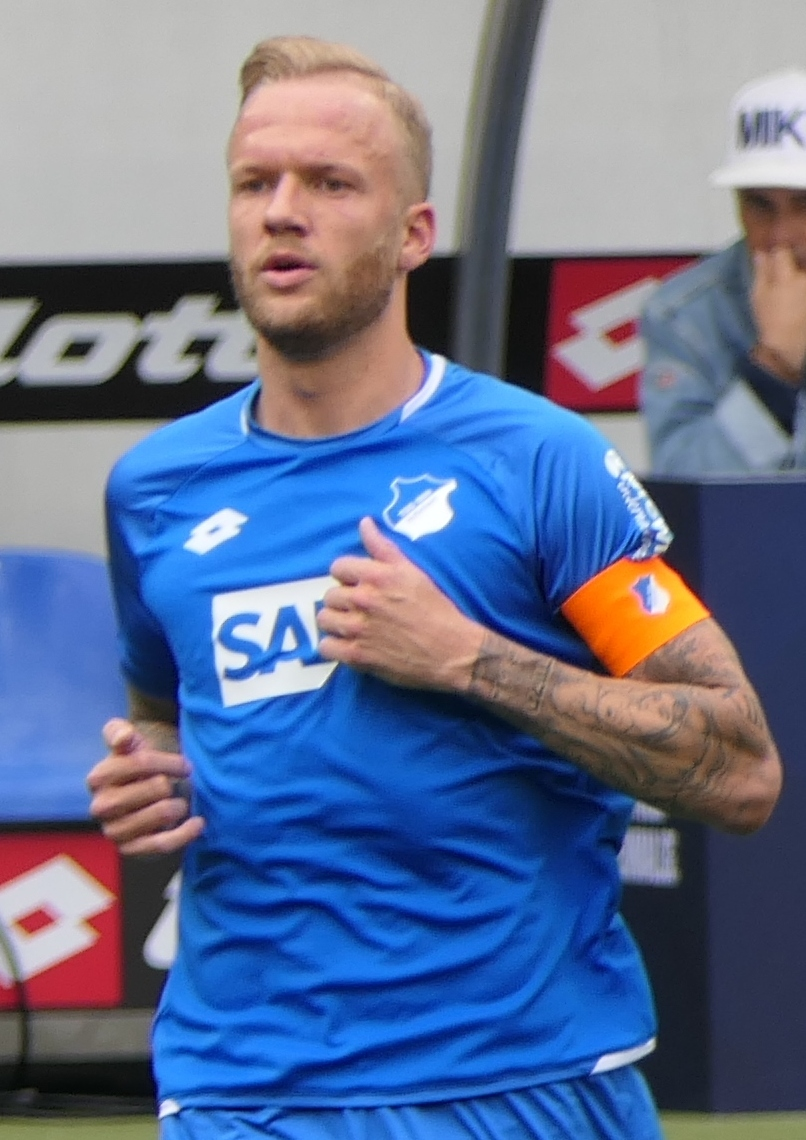
- Vogt with 1899 Hoffenheim in 2019

Personal information
- Date of birth: 23 September 1991 (age 35)
- Place of birth: Witten, Germany
- Height: 1.94 m (6 ft 4 in)
- Positions: Centre-back; defensive midfielder

Youth career
- 1995–2002: VfB Langendreerholz
- 2002–2004: WSV Bochum
- 2004–2010: VfL Bochum

Senior career*
Years	Team	Apps	(Gls)
2009–2010	VfL Bochum II	19	(1)
2009–2012	VfL Bochum	38	(2)
2012–2014	FC Augsburg	56	(2)
2014–2016	1. FC Köln	55	(1)
2014–2016	→ 1. FC Köln II	1	(0)
2016–2024	TSG Hoffenheim	193	(0)
2020	→ Werder Bremen (loan)	14	(0)
2024–2025	Union Berlin	34	(1)
2025–2026	VfL Bochum	10	(0)

International career
2008–2009	Germany U18	5	(0)
2009–2010	Germany U19	3	(0)
2011	Germany U20	1	(0)
2011–2013	Germany U21	8	(0)
- * Club domestic league appearances and goals

Kevin Vogt (born 23 September 1991) is a German former professional footballer who played as a centre-back or defensive midfielder.

== Club career ==
At the age of 3, Vogt started playing football at VfB Langendreerholz, a local club in Bochum. There, he stayed until 2002 when becoming old enough to play in the 'D-Jugend' (in Germany the playing level for 11-to-13-year-old youths) and joined WSV Bochum. In 2004, he was able to take the next step when he was spotted by local heavyweight VfL Bochum and signed a youth contract with them. There he ran through all the youth ranks and eventually signed a professional contract on 16 December 2008.

He played his first Bundesliga match for VfL Bochum, and first fully professional game, on 18 April 2009 in a 0–2 loss against Borussia Dortmund. Vogt was substituted on in the 84th minute for Christoph Dabrowski. But this remained his only Bundesliga game for Bochum. During the following 2009–10 season, Vogt only was capped for the second team, playing in fourth tier Regionalliga and the first team was relegated into the 2. Bundesliga at the end of the season. There Vogt became a regular for the next two years before joining newly promoted Bundesliga side FC Augsburg in Summer 2012. Augsburg paid a transfer fee of a reported €700,000.

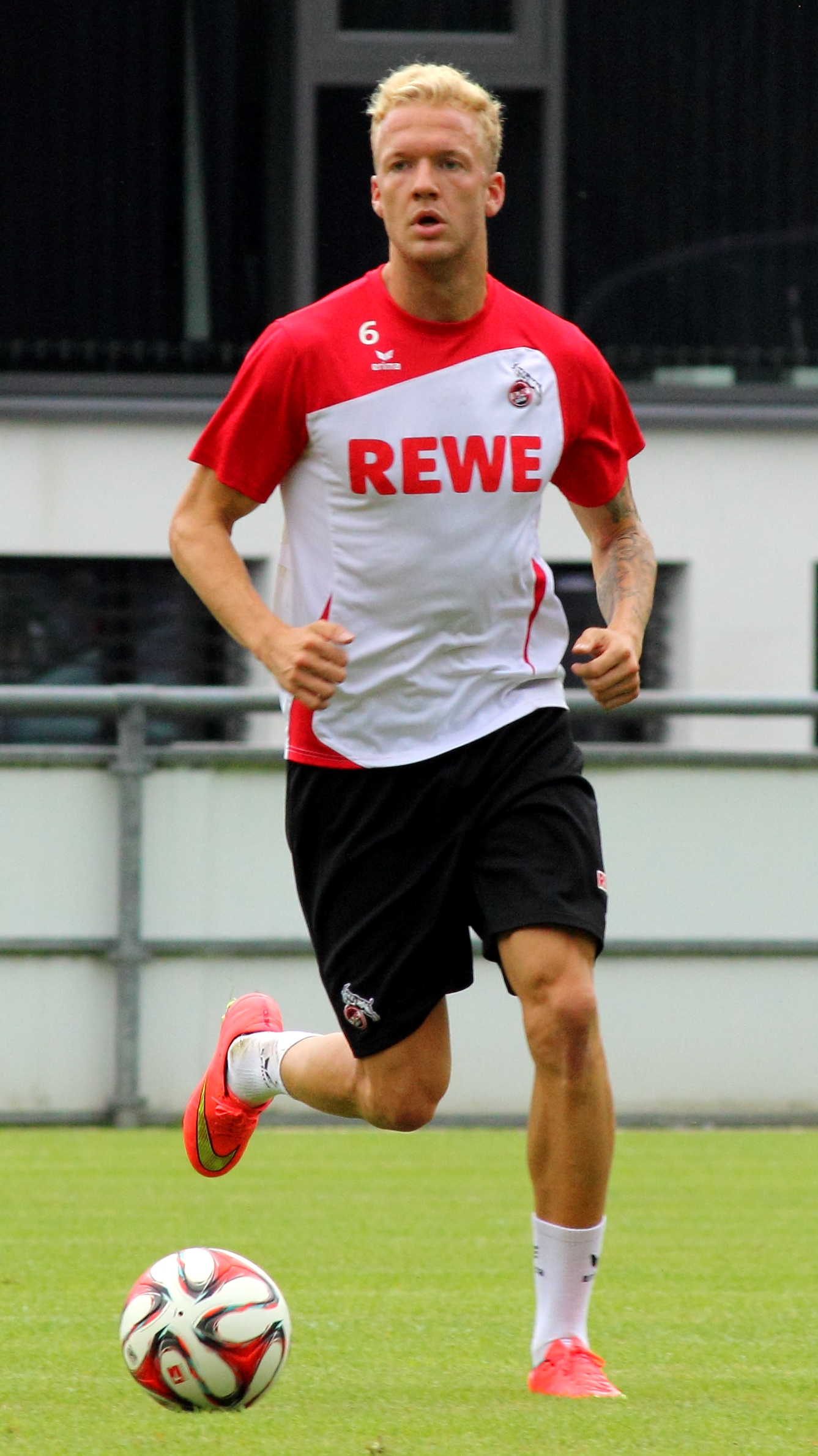
Vogt with Köln in 2014

On 26 May 2014, it was announced that Vogt would join 1. FC Köln and sign a contract expiring 2017. The transfer fee amounts allegedly €1.5 million.

On 30 May 2016, TSG Hoffenheim announced the signing of Vogt.

On 12 January 2020, Vogt was loaned out to fellow Bundesliga club Werder Bremen until the end of the season.

On 11 January 2024, Vogt moved to fellow Bundesliga club Union Berlin for a fee reported to be around €2 million.

On 7 July 2025, Bochum announced the signing of Vogt.

== International career ==
From 2008 to 2013, Vogt was a member of several German youth teams. He played his first game on 17 December 2008 against Israel U18.

== Career statistics ==
As of match played 9 May 2026

Appearances and goals by club, season and competition
Club	Season	League			Cup		Europe		Other		Total	
Club	Season	Division	Apps	Goals	Apps	Goals	Apps	Goals	Apps	Goals	Apps	Goals
VfL Bochum II	2008–09	Regionalliga West	2	0	—		—		—		2	0
VfL Bochum II	2009–10	Regionalliga West	6	1	—		—		—		6	1
VfL Bochum II	2010–11	Regionalliga West	11	0	—		—		—		11	0
VfL Bochum II	Total		19	1	0	0	0	0	0	0	19	1
VfL Bochum	2008–09	Bundesliga	1	0	0	0	—		—		1	0
VfL Bochum	2009–10	Bundesliga	0	0	0	0	—		—		0	0
VfL Bochum	2010–11	2. Bundesliga	21	0	0	0	—		—		21	0
VfL Bochum	2011–12	2. Bundesliga	16	2	0	0	—		—		16	2
VfL Bochum	Total		38	2	0	0	0	0	0	0	38	2
FC Augsburg	2012–13	Bundesliga	28	1	2	0	—		—		30	1
FC Augsburg	2013–14	Bundesliga	28	1	3	0	—		—		31	1
FC Augsburg	Total		56	2	5	0	0	0	0	0	61	2
1. FC Köln	2014–15	Bundesliga	32	1	3	0	—		—		35	1
1. FC Köln	2015–16	Bundesliga	23	0	2	0	—		—		25	0
1. FC Köln	Total		55	1	5	0	0	0	0	0	60	1
1. FC Köln II	2015–16	Regionalliga West	1	0	—		—		—		1	0
TSG Hoffenheim	2016–17	Bundesliga	31	0	2	0	—		—		33	0
TSG Hoffenheim	2017–18	Bundesliga	31	0	2	0	7	0	—		40	0
TSG Hoffenheim	2018–19	Bundesliga	28	0	2	0	4	0	—		34	0
TSG Hoffenheim	2019–20	Bundesliga	11	0	1	0	—		—		12	0
TSG Hoffenheim	2020–21	Bundesliga	24	0	2	0	6	0	—		32	0
TSG Hoffenheim	2021–22	Bundesliga	30	0	3	0	—		—		33	0
TSG Hoffenheim	2022–23	Bundesliga	22	0	2	0	—		—		24	0
TSG Hoffenheim	2023–24	Bundesliga	16	0	2	0	—		—		18	0
TSG Hoffenheim	Total		193	0	16	0	17	0	0	0	226	0
Werder Bremen (loan)	2019–20	Bundesliga	14	0	2	0	—		1 (Note: Appearance in Bundesliga relegation play-offs)	0	17	0
Union Berlin	2023–24	Bundesliga	16	0	0	0	—		—		18	0
Union Berlin	2024–25	Bundesliga	18	1	2	0	—		—		20	1
Union Berlin	Total		34	1	2	0	—		—		36	1
VfL Bochum	2025–26	2. Bundesliga	10	0	1	0	—		—		11	0
Career total			420	7	31	0	17	0	1	0	469	7
