= Pascal Pellowski =

German footballer

Personal information
- Date of birth: 18 December 1988 (age 37)
- Place of birth: Darmstadt, West Germany
- Height: 1.87 m (6 ft 1 1/2 in)
- Position: Centre back

Youth career
- –2006: SV Darmstadt 98

Senior career*
Years	Team	Apps	(Gls)
2006–2009	SV Darmstadt 98	60	(2)
2009–2011	VfL Bochum II	63	(1)
2009	→ VfL Bochum	0	(0)
2011–2012	SV Elversberg	18	(2)
2011	→ SV Elversberg II	1	(0)
2012–2014	1. FC Saarbrücken	7	(0)
2015–2019	Astoria Walldorf	109	(5)
- * Club domestic league appearances and goals as of 19:51, 21 July 2019 (UTC)

Pascal Pellowski (born 18 December 1988) is a German footballer who most recently played for Astoria Walldorf.

== Career ==
=== Statistics ===
As of 21 May 2013

Club performance			League		Cup		Total	
Season	Club	League	Apps	Goals	Apps	Goals	Apps	Goals
Germany			League		DFB-Pokal		Total	
2006–07	SV Darmstadt 98	Regionalliga Süd	1	0	0	0	1	0
2007–08	SV Darmstadt 98	Oberliga Hessen	31	2	1	0	32	2
2008–09	SV Darmstadt 98	Regionalliga Süd	28	0	1	0	29	0
2009–10	VfL Bochum	Bundesliga	0	0	0	0	0	0
2009–10	VfL Bochum II	Regionalliga West	32	1	—		32	1
2010–11	VfL Bochum II	Regionalliga West	31	0	—		31	0
2011–12	SV Elversberg	Regionalliga West	18	2	—		18	2
2011–12	SV Elversberg II	Oberliga Südwest	1	0	—		1	0
2012–13	1. FC Saarbrücken	3. Liga	3	0	0	0	3	0
Total	Germany		145	5	2	0	147	5
Career total			145	5	2	0	147	5
