= Christian Fuchs =

Austrian footballer (born 1986)

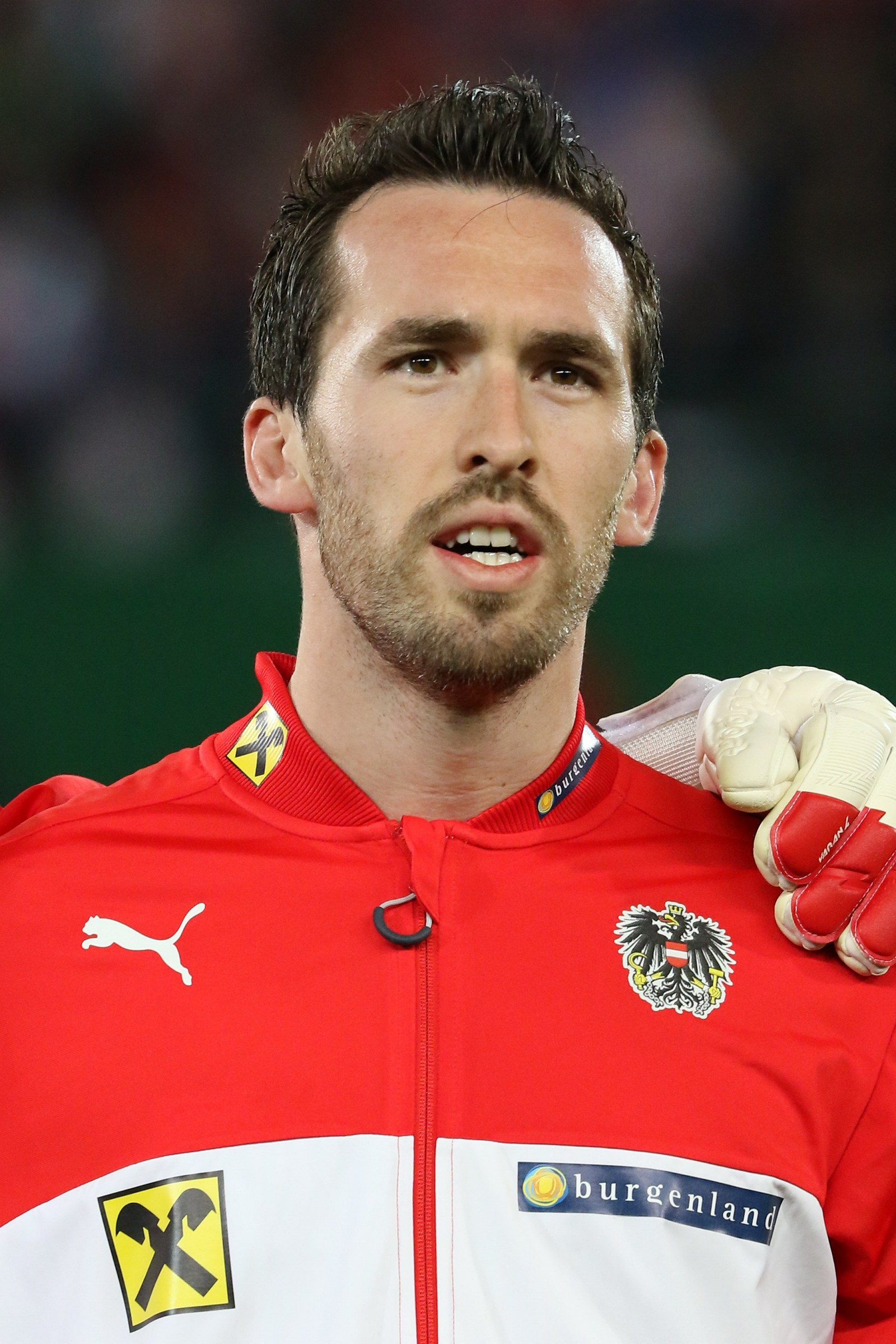
- Fuchs with Austria in 2016

Personal information
- Full name: Christian Fuchs
- Date of birth: 7 April 1986 (age 40)
- Place of birth: Neunkirchen, Austria
- Height: 1.87 m (6 ft 2 in)
- Position: Left-back

Youth career
- 1992–2001: SVg Pitten
- 2001–2002: Wiener Neustadt

Senior career*
Years	Team	Apps	(Gls)
2002–2003	Wiener Neustadt	12	(0)
2003–2008	SV Mattersburg	141	(11)
2008–2011	VfL Bochum	53	(6)
2010–2011	→ Mainz 05 (loan)	31	(0)
2011–2015	Schalke 04	99	(4)
2015–2021	Leicester City	116	(2)
2021–2022	Charlotte FC	26	(3)
2021	→ Charlotte Independence (loan)	15	(1)
2023	FSA Pro	0	(0)
Total		493	(27)

International career
2002–2003	Austria U17	24	(6)
2003–2005	Austria U19	7	(1)
2005–2006	Austria U21	10	(3)
2006–2016	Austria	78	(1)

Managerial career
- 2025–2026: Newport County
Medal record
Representing Austria
Men's football
UEFA European Under-17 Championship
Third place	2003
- * Club domestic league appearances and goals

Christian Fuchs (Austrian German: [ˈkrɪsti̯a(ː)n ˈfʊks]; born 7 April 1986) is an Austrian football manager and former player who was most recently manager of EFL League Two club Newport County. A left back, Fuchs was part of the Leicester City 2015–16 Premier League winning squad and captained the Austria national team at UEFA Euro 2016.

He began his senior career as a teenager at Wiener Neustadt before signing his first professional contract at 17 with SV Mattersburg, challenging for the Austrian Football Bundesliga title and taking part in European competitions. In 2008, he left for Germany, signing for VfL Bochum. After a season on loan at Mainz 05, he signed for Schalke 04 in 2011, where he contested the UEFA Champions League but suffered a serious knee injury. In June 2015, he signed for Leicester, winning the Premier League in his first season at the club. After leaving Leicester in June 2021, he spent one season in the MLS with Charlotte FC, before retiring from professional football in January 2023.

A full international from 2006 to 2016, Fuchs earned 78 caps for Austria. He represented the nation at the UEFA Euro 2008, and the UEFA Euro 2016, captaining them for the first time in 2010 and on a permanent basis from 2012, before retiring from international duty in 2016.

== Club career ==
=== Early career ===
Born in Neunkirchen, Lower Austria, his father was an amateur goalkeeper. He began as a forward at local team SVg Pitten before moving to 1. Wiener Neustädter SC at the age of 14. At the age of 15, while still an amateur and at mainstream school, Fuchs played for their senior team. When he was 17, he signed his first professional deal at SV Mattersburg, a team who despite coming from a town of 6,000 drew league record average crowds of 17,000, came third in the Austrian Football Bundesliga and played in European competition.

Prior to UEFA Euro 2008, he joined German Bundesliga side VfL Bochum. He later described it as a useful move to play regularly while attracting attention from bigger teams. In 2010, he was signed on loan by 1. FSV Mainz 05, a newly promoted team who ended the season in the top five.

=== Schalke ===
On 6 June 2011, Fuchs signed with Schalke 04 on a deal until June 2015. The transfer fee was reportedly undisclosed by Schalke's sport and communications manager Horst Heldt. Fuchs was assigned the number 23 shirt, previously worn by Danilo Fernando Avelar.

His first goal for the club was a free kick in the Bundesliga against Mainz. In his time at the team from Gelsenkirchen, he competed in the UEFA Champions League, but suffered a long-term knee injury.

=== Leicester City ===
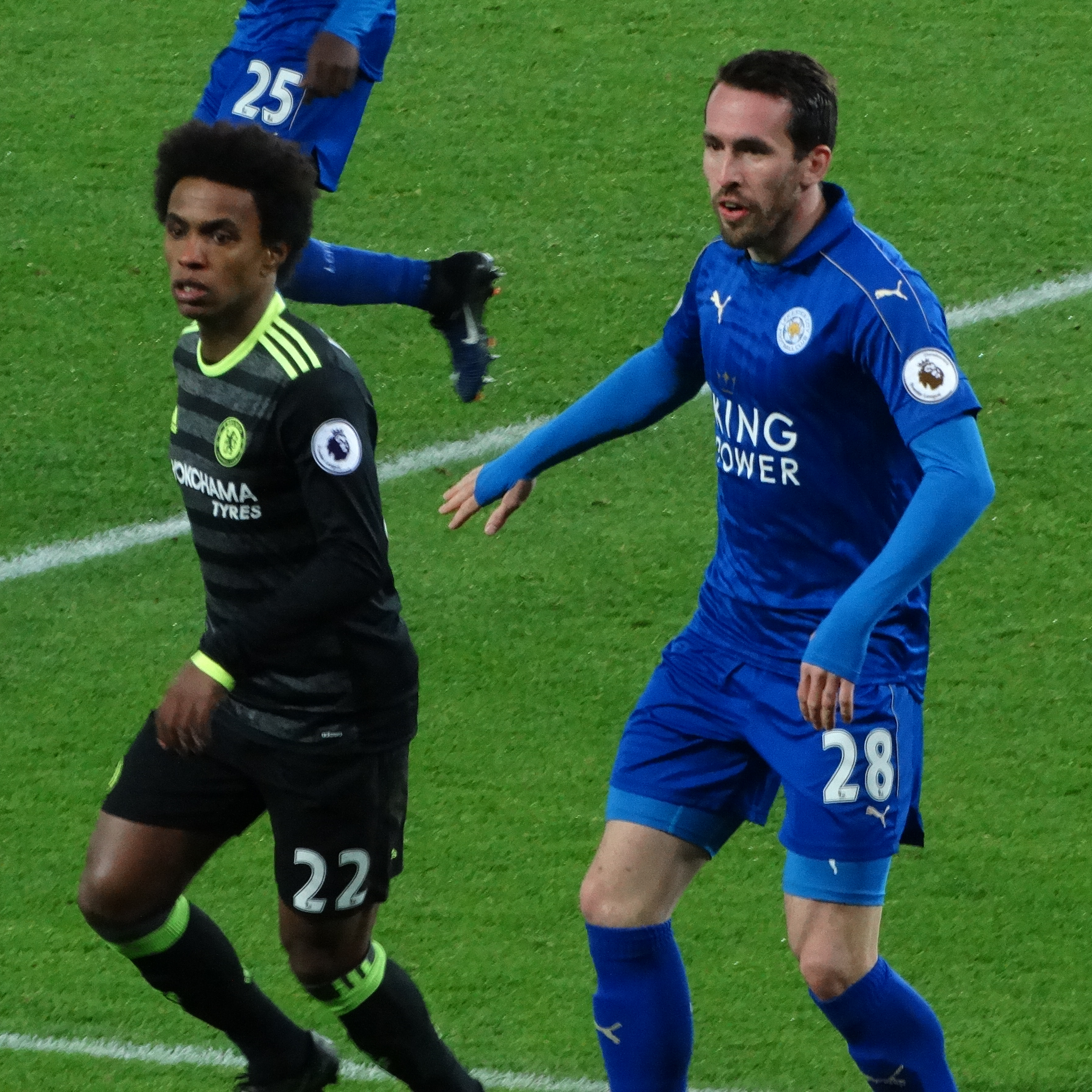
Fuchs (right) in a match against Chelsea on 14 January 2017

On 3 June 2015, Premier League side Leicester City announced the signing of Fuchs on a free transfer, signing a three-year deal with the Foxes effective from 1 July. Signed under previous manager Nigel Pearson, Fuchs didn't have a regular spot in new manager Claudio Ranieri's squad until October. Fuchs made an appearance in Leicester's third round League Cup tie against West Ham, providing an assist for Andy King's extra time winner. Following a 5–2 loss to Arsenal on 26 September, Ranieri elected to shake up his defensive back four, inserting Fuchs and teammate Danny Simpson in place of Jeffrey Schlupp and Ritchie De Laet respectively. Fuchs made his first Premier League start the next week against Norwich City.

In his first season, Leicester finished as champions on odds of 5,000–1, making Fuchs the first Austrian to receive a Premier League winners' medal since Arsenal's Alex Manninger in 1998. Following the insertion of Fuchs into the lineup on Matchday 8, Leicester City led the Premier League in clean sheets along with Arsenal, with 15. Fuchs himself led the league during this period in successful tackles with 77, while finishing second in interceptions with 98.

Prior to signing for Leicester, Fuchs had an offer to play in the United States, where his family live, but he turned it down. He had said in March 2016, "My intention is to play in the US. I have come [to Leicester] for three years. I decided that I would sign one last contract in Europe, when I left Schalke, then go to the US."

On 21 October 2016, Fuchs signed a new contract with Leicester, keeping him with the club until June 2019. The next day, Fuchs scored his first goal for Leicester against Crystal Palace, volleying home a corner-kick clearance by Christian Benteke for the team's final goal in a 3–1 victory.

On 8 May 2019, Fuchs signed a new one-year contract with Leicester.

On 18 June 2020, Leicester announced that they had triggered a one-year contract extension for Fuchs.

On 21 May 2021, Leicester announced that Fuchs would leave the club at the expiration of his contract at the end of the 2020–21 season.

=== Charlotte FC ===
On 7 June 2021, it was announced that Fuchs would join Major League Soccer expansion side Charlotte FC. On 27 July 2021, With Charlotte due to play MLS from the 2022 season, Fuchs joined USL Championship side Charlotte Independence for the remainder of 2021. After playing as a regular with Charlotte in their expansion season, Fuchs announced on 5 January 2023 he would be retiring from professional football.

=== FSA Pro ===
In November 2023, Fuchs appeared in the playoffs for FSA Pro, the United Premier Soccer League side of Fox Soccer Academy, which Fuchs owns and runs.

== International career ==
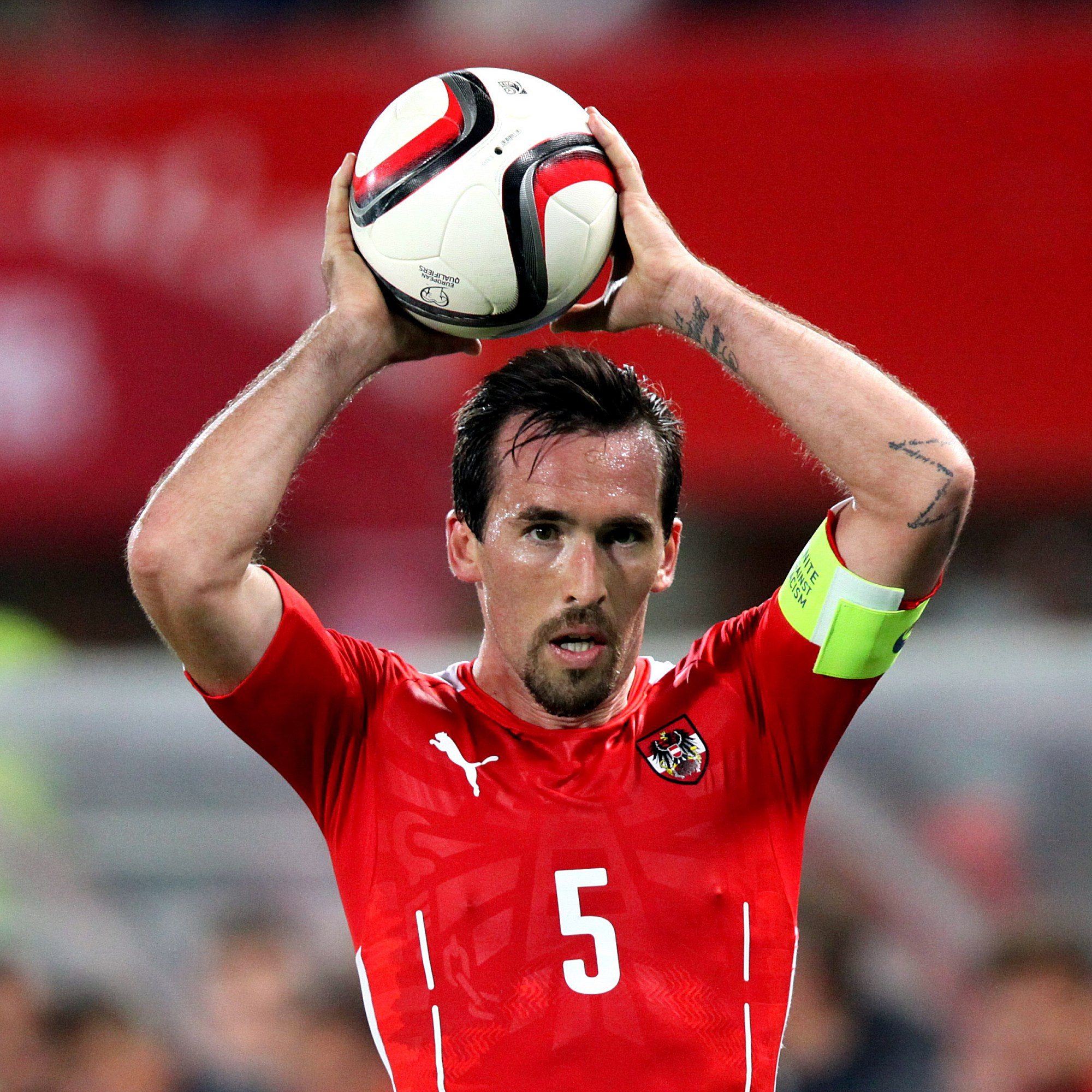
Fuchs during a UEFA Euro 2016 qualifier against Moldova in September 2015

Fuchs made his debut for the Austria national team on 23 May 2006 in a friendly match against Croatia, replacing Stefan Lexa for the final six minutes of the 4–1 loss at the Ernst-Happel-Stadion in Vienna.

He was part of the Austrian international squad as they co-hosted UEFA Euro 2008 alongside Switzerland. He made only one appearance in the group stage elimination, playing the entirety of the 1–0 loss to Germany in their last match of the tournament.

On 11 August 2010, in the absence of regular captain Marc Janko, Fuchs captained his nation for the first time in a 1–0 friendly loss to the Swiss in Klagenfurt. That 17 November, he scored his first international goal, equalising in a 2–1 home friendly loss to Greece.

Fuchs received the armband on a permanent basis at the behest of manager Marcel Koller on 13 August 2012. He played all ten games as they qualified for the UEFA Euro 2016, the first time they did so, and featured in every minute of the group stage elimination in France. Afterwards, he retired from international football with a total of 78 caps, declaring "I am very proud of the 10 years that I have spent with the national team. I did everything with passion and, as I said, I am very, very proud."

== Coaching career ==
After retiring from professional football, Fuchs stayed at Charlotte FC and was appointed as an assistant coach under Christian Lattanzio on 6 January 2023.

On 20 November 2025, Fuchs was secure his first managerial position when he was appointed by EFL League Two club Newport County. He replaced David Hughes, who was dismissed after a disastrous start to the 2025–26 league campaign, with Newport bottom of the table on 11 points after 16 matches. Fuchs' arrival was deemed a "left-field" move though chairman Huw Jenkins defended the appointment, emphasising how Fuchs matched the club's long-term ambitions and could bring a fresh approach to retain their EFL status.

Fuchs took charge of his first match two days later, where they were well beaten 3–0 at Oldham Athletic. Despite defeat, Fuchs defended his players in the press, maintaining a positive stance on their ability to avoid relegation and reflected on his own experiences from his playing career. After eight consecutive matches without a win, Fuchs won his first game as a manager with a 2–0 victory over Crewe Alexandra, which moved them off the bottom of the league. A 2–1 win at Barrow on the final day of the season ensured that Newport finished in 20th place, successfully retaining their league status and avoiding relegation.

Following their success, Fuchs iterated that Newport must ensure they do not face another relegation battle in the following season. Former Wales striker Iwan Roberts suggested that Fuchs could be a contender to become the manager of his former club Leicester City after their relegation from the EFL Championship at the end of the season. On 27 June 2026, Fuchs unexpectedly resigned as Newport manager just days before players were due to return to pre-season training. Jenkins later said that Fuchs' decision arose as he felt "he didn't have a lot to give", admitting that he was both "surprised" and "disappointed" at Fuchs' departure.

== Personal life ==
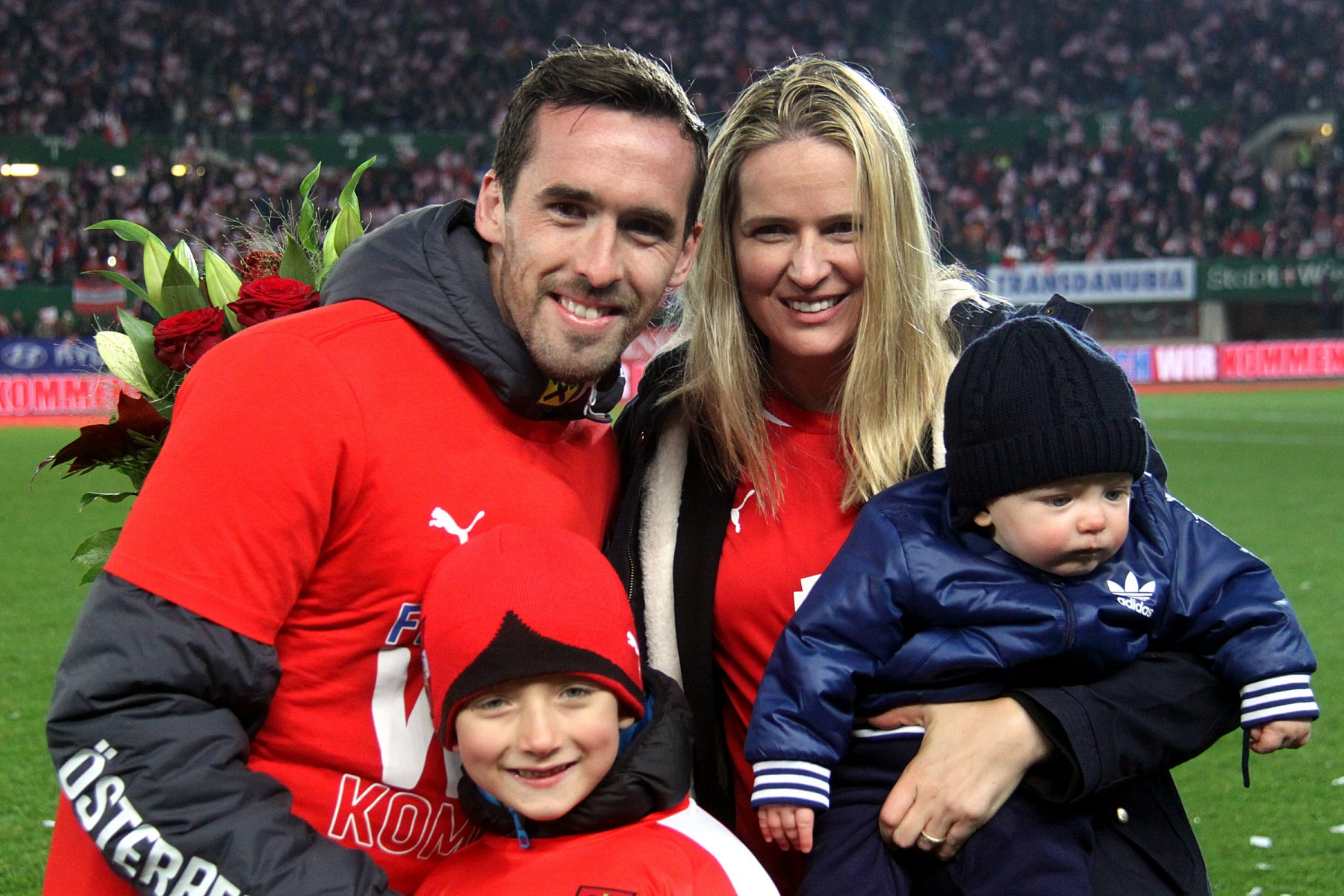
Fuchs, his wife, and their children in October 2015

Fuchs' wife, Raluca Gold-Fuchs, with whom he has a stepson, son, and daughter, is a businesswoman based in New York, formerly of Goldman Sachs. He runs a public relations company and a football academy in New York, and in 2016 he stated he planned to move there permanently after his football career.

The Leicester Mercury described Fuchs as "not your stereotypical footballer...[he] has more strings to his bow than an orchestra". He is noted for his online video series "No Fuchs Given", which consists of himself and teammates doing unusual football-related challenges, such as him and Robert Huth shooting the ball as hard as possible at each other's backsides. This developed into a fashion brand of the same name.

In 2016 he stated his desire to become an NFL placekicker and demonstrated his skills on the BBC's NFL coverage.

In June 2026, Fuchs began playing local cricket in Derbyshire.

== Career statistics ==
=== Club ===
Appearances and goals by club, season and competition
Club	Season	League			National cup (Note: Includes Austrian Cup, DFB-Pokal, FA Cup, U.S. Open Cup)		League cup (Note: Includes Football League/EFL Cup)		Continental		Other		Total	
Club	Season	Division	Apps	Goals	Apps	Goals	Apps	Goals	Apps	Goals	Apps	Goals	Apps	Goals
Wiener Neustadt	2002–03	Austrian Landesliga	12	0	0	0	—		—		—		12	0
SV Mattersburg	2003–04	Austrian Bundesliga	13	0	1	0	—		—		—		14	0
SV Mattersburg	2004–05	Austrian Bundesliga	25	2	2	0	—		—		—		27	2
SV Mattersburg	2005–06	Austrian Bundesliga	35	1	5	2	—		—		—		40	3
SV Mattersburg	2006–07	Austrian Bundesliga	35	6	4	1	—		2 (Note: Appearances in UEFA Cup)	0	—		41	7
SV Mattersburg	2007–08	Austrian Bundesliga	33	2	0	0	—		—		—		33	2
SV Mattersburg	Total		141	11	12	3	—		2	0	—		155	14
VfL Bochum	2008–09	Bundesliga	22	2	0	0	—		—		—		22	2
VfL Bochum	2009–10	Bundesliga	31	4	2	0	—		—		—		33	4
VfL Bochum	Total		53	6	2	0	—		—		—		55	6
Mainz 05 (loan)	2010–11	Bundesliga	31	0	4	0	—		—		—		35	0
Schalke 04	2011–12	Bundesliga	29	2	3	0	—		11 (Note: Appearances in UEFA Champions League)	2	1 (Note: Appearance in DFL-Supercup)	0	44	4
Schalke 04	2012–13	Bundesliga	29	0	2	0	—		6	1	—		37	1
Schalke 04	2013–14	Bundesliga	16	0	2	0	—		7	0	—		25	0
Schalke 04	2014–15	Bundesliga	25	2	0	0	—		5	1	—		30	3
Schalke 04	Total		99	4	7	0	—		29	4	1	0	136	8
Leicester City	2015–16	Premier League	32	0	0	0	2	0	—		—		34	0
Leicester City	2016–17	Premier League	36	2	2	0	0	0	9	0	1 (Note: Appearance in FA Community Shield)	0	48	2
Leicester City	2017–18	Premier League	25	0	2	0	2	0	—		—		29	0
Leicester City	2018–19	Premier League	3	0	1	0	4	1	—		—		8	1
Leicester City	2019–20	Premier League	11	0	2	0	4	0	—		—		17	0
Leicester City	2020–21	Premier League	9	0	1	0	1	0	5 (Note: Appearances in UEFA Europa League)	0	—		16	0
Leicester City	Total		116	2	8	0	13	1	14	0	1	0	152	3
Charlotte Independence (loan)	2021	USL Championship	15	1	—		—		—		2 (Note: Appearances in USL Championship play-offs)	1	17	2
Charlotte FC	2022	Major League Soccer	26	3	1	0	—		—		—		27	3
Career total			493	27	34	3	13	1	45	4	4	1	589	36

=== International ===
Appearances and goals by national team and year
National team	Year	Apps	Goals
Austria	2006	4	0
Austria	2007	10	0
Austria	2008	10	0
Austria	2009	5	0
Austria	2010	7	1
Austria	2011	11	0
Austria	2012	4	0
Austria	2013	9	0
Austria	2014	5	0
Austria	2015	7	0
Austria	2016	6	0
Total		78	1

Scores and results list Austria's goal tally first, score column indicates score after each Fuchs goal.

List of international goals scored by Christian Fuchs
No.	Date	Venue	Opponent	Score	Result	Competition
1	17 November 2010	Ernst-Happel-Stadion, Vienna, Austria	Greece	1–1	1–2	Friendly

== Managerial statistics ==
As of 27 June 2026

Managerial record by team and tenure
Team	Nat.	From	To	Record					Ref.
Team	Nat.	From	To	G	W	D	L	Win %	Ref.
Newport County	(Wales)	20 November 2025	27 June 2026	31	9	5	17	29.03	
Career Total				31	9	5	17	29.03	

== Honours ==
Schalke 04

- DFL-Supercup: 2011

Leicester City

- Premier League: 2015–16
- FA Cup: 2020–21

Austria U17

- UEFA European Under-17 Championship third place: 2003

Individual

- kicker Bundesliga Team of the Season: 2010–11, 2011–12
