= Markus Scholz =

German footballer

Personal information
- Date of birth: 17 May 1988 (age 38)
- Place of birth: Iserlohn, West Germany
- Height: 1.96 m (6 ft 5 in)
- Position: Goalkeeper

Team information
- Current team: SC Freital
- Number: 26

Youth career
- –2007: SF Oestrich-Iserlohn

Senior career*
Years	Team	Apps	(Gls)
2007–2009	SF Oestrich-Iserlohn	26	(0)
2009–2012	VfL Bochum II	32	(0)
2012	VfL Bochum	0	(0)
2012–2015	Dynamo Dresden II	21	(0)
2012–2015	Dynamo Dresden	6	(0)
2015–2021	Waldhof Mannheim	139	(0)
2021–2024	TSV Steinbach Haiger	21	(0)
2023–	SC Freital	15	(0)
- * Club domestic league appearances and goals as of 8 June 2024

Markus Scholz (born 17 May 1988) is a German professional footballer who plays as a goalkeeper for NOFV-Oberliga Süd club SC Freital.
