= Oğuzhan Kefkir =

German footballer

Personal information
- Date of birth: 27 August 1991 (age 35)
- Place of birth: Wuppertal, Germany
- Height: 1.77 m (5 ft 10 in)
- Position: Midfielder

Team information
- Current team: Türkspor Dortmund
- Number: 38

Youth career
- 1997–2002: SV Bayer Wuppertal 04
- 2002–2010: VfL Bochum

Senior career*
Years	Team	Apps	(Gls)
2010–2012	VfL Bochum II	30	(4)
2010–2012	VfL Bochum	9	(0)
2012–2013	Alemannia Aachen	32	(6)
2013–2015	Borussia Dortmund II	56	(4)
2015–2016	Borussia Dortmund II	2	(0)
2016–2017	VfR Aalen	7	(0)
2017–2019	Uerdingen 05	58	(12)
2019–2023	Rot-Weiss Essen	126	(19)
2023–2024	Rot-Weiß Oberhausen	17	(1)
2024	Wuppertaler SV	11	(1)
2025–	Türkspor Dortmund	0	(0)
- * Club domestic league appearances and goals as of 10 January 2025

Oğuzhan Kefkir (born 27 August 1991) is a German professional footballer who plays for Türkspor Dortmund as a midfielder.

== Career ==
Born in Wuppertal, Kefkir began his career in 1997 with SV Bayer Wuppertal 04. In 2002, he joined VfL Bochum's youth academy. He made his Bundesliga debut for VfL Bochum on 3 April 2010 against SC Freiburg. On 27 May 2010, he signed his first professional contract for VfL Bochum and was promoted from the U-19 team.

In June 2023, Kefkir joined Rot-Weiß Oberhausen in Regionalliga.

== Career statistics ==
As of 6 June 2013

Appearances and goals by club, season and competition
Club	Season	League			DFB-Pokal		Total	
Club	Season	Division	Apps	Goals	Apps	Goals	Apps	Goals
VfL Bochum II	2009–10	Regionalliga West	0	0	—		0	0
VfL Bochum II	2010–11	Regionalliga West	16	2	—		16	2
VfL Bochum II	2011–12	Regionalliga West	14	2	—		14	2
VfL Bochum II	Total		30	4	1	1	30	4
VfL Bochum	2009–10	Bundesliga	1	0	0	0	1	0
VfL Bochum	2010–11	2. Bundesliga	1	0	0	0	1	0
VfL Bochum	2011–12	2. Bundesliga	7	0	1	1	8	1
VfL Bochum	Total		9	0	1	1	10	1
Alemannia Aachen	2012–13	3. Liga	32	6	1	0	33	6
Borussia Dortmund II	2013–14	3. Liga	0	0	—		0	0
Career total			71	10	2	1	73	11
