= Mirkan Aydın =

German footballer

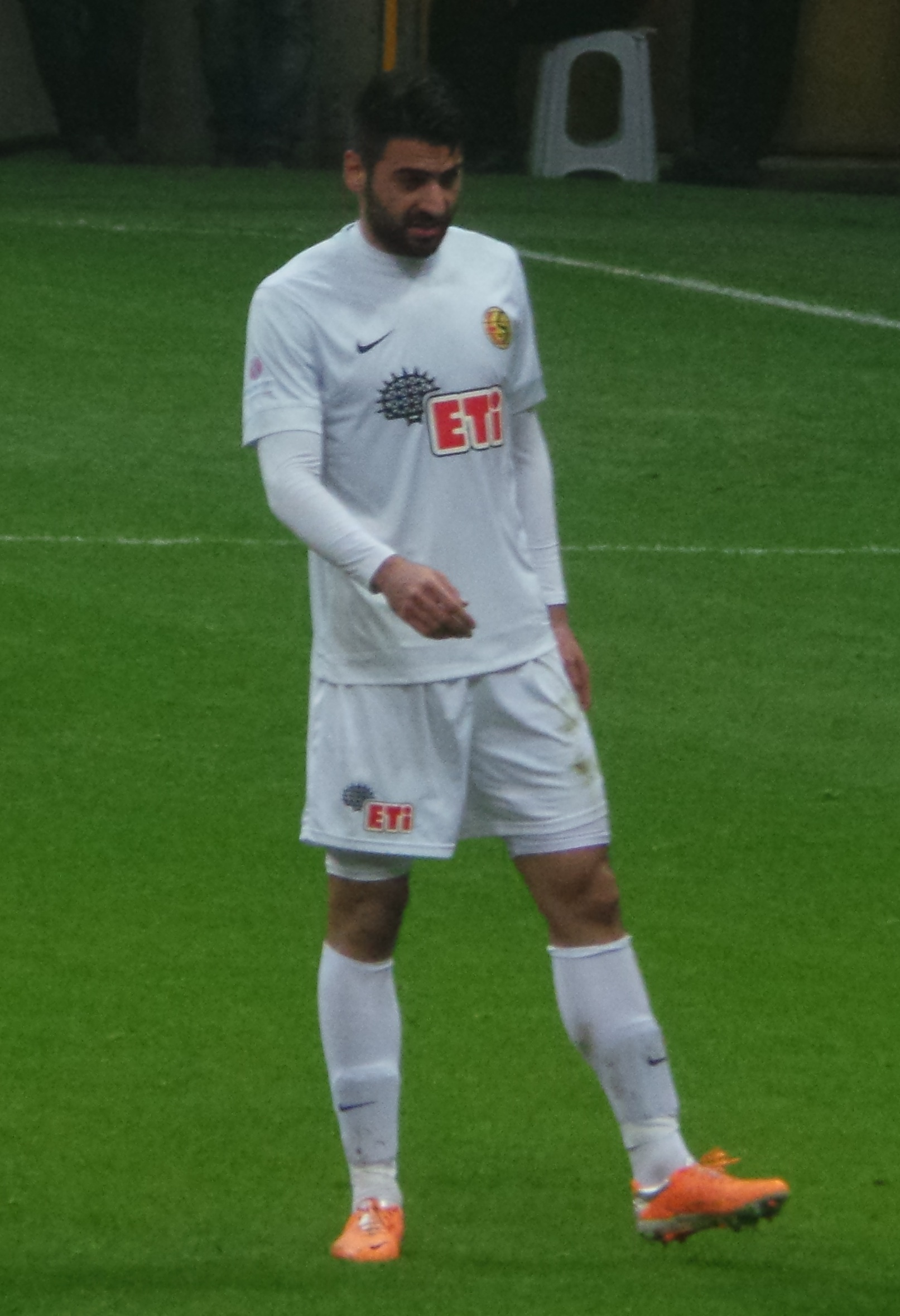
- Aydın playing for Eskişehirspor in 2014

Personal information
- Date of birth: 8 July 1987 (age 39)
- Place of birth: Hattingen, West Germany
- Height: 1.88 m (6 ft 2 in)
- Position: Forward

Youth career
- 1998–2001: VfL Winz-Baak
- 2001–2004: SG Wattenscheid 09
- 2004–2005: TSG Sprockhövel

Senior career*
Years	Team	Apps	(Gls)
2005–2007	TSG Sprockhövel	56	(26)
2007–2011	VfL Bochum II	74	(21)
2009–2014	VfL Bochum	77	(20)
2014–2015	Eskişehirspor	13	(1)
2015–2016	Göztepe	19	(4)
2016	Dalkurd FF	26	(12)
2017	Preußen Münster	14	(5)
2017–2018	Altınordu	33	(13)
2018–2021	Hatayspor	58	(19)
2021	İstanbulspor	16	(3)
2021–2022	Ankaraspor	7	(1)
Total		393	(125)
- * Club domestic league appearances and goals

Mirkan Aydın (born 8 July 1987) is a German former professional footballer who played as a forward.

== Career statistics ==
As of 1 January 2017

Appearances and goals by club, season and competition
Club	Season	League			Cup		Total	
Club	Season	Division	Apps	Goals	Apps	Goals	Apps	Goals
TSG Sprockhövel	2005–06	Verbandsliga Westfalen	30	17	—		30	17
TSG Sprockhövel	2006–07	Verbandsliga Westfalen	26	9	—		26	9
TSG Sprockhövel	Total		56	26	0	0	56	26
VfL Bochum II	2007–08	Oberliga Westfalen	14	2	—		14	2
VfL Bochum II	2008–09	Regionalliga West	29	4	—		29	4
VfL Bochum II	2009–10	Regionalliga West	30	14	—		30	4
VfL Bochum II	2010–11	Regionalliga West	0	0	—		0	0
VfL Bochum II	2011–12	Regionalliga West	1	1	—		1	1
VfL Bochum II	Total		74	21	0	0	74	21
VfL Bochum	2009–10	Bundesliga	1	0	0	0	1	0
VfL Bochum	2010–11	2. Bundesliga	15	8	0	0	15	8
VfL Bochum	2011–12	2. Bundesliga	22	5	3	2	26	7
VfL Bochum	2012–13	2. Bundesliga	10	3	1	0	11	3
VfL Bochum	2013–14	2. Bundesliga	29	4	2	0	31	4
VfL Bochum	Total		77	20	6	2	83	22
Eskişehirspor	2014–15	Süper Lig	13	1	5	1	18	2
Göztepe	2015–16	TFF First League	19	4	2	0	21	4
Dalkurd FF	2016	Superettan	26	12	0	0	26	12
Career total			265	84	13	3	278	87
