= Jonas Acquistapace =

German footballer (born 1989)

Personal information
- Date of birth: 18 June 1989 (age 37)
- Place of birth: Soest, West Germany
- Height: 1.90 m (6 ft 3 in)
- Position: Centre back

Youth career
- 1993–2001: Soester SV
- 2001–2003: Preußen Werl
- 2003–2006: LR Ahlen
- 2006–2007: Rot Weiss Ahlen
- 2007–2008: VfL Bochum

Senior career*
Years	Team	Apps	(Gls)
2007	Rot Weiss Ahlen II	3	(0)
2008–2014	VfL Bochum II	59	(0)
2011–2014	VfL Bochum	69	(0)
2014–2015	Omonia Nicosia	13	(0)
2015	SV Wehen Wiesbaden	16	(0)
2015–2016	Hallescher FC	26	(1)
2017	FSV Zwickau	14	(0)
2017	Sportfreunde Lotte	6	(0)
2018	FSV Zwickau	14	(0)
2018–2019	SC Verl	9	(0)
2019	SG Wattenscheid 09	8	(0)
2020	SV Lippstadt	6	(0)
Total		243	(1)
- * Club domestic league appearances and goals

Jonas Acquistapace (born 18 June 1989) is a German former professional footballer who played as a centre-back.

== Career ==
Acquistapace played for Omonia Nicosia on Cyprus six months. He returned to Germany in January 2015 signing for 3. Liga side SV Wehen Wiesbaden on a year and a half-deal until 2016. He made his competitive debut for the club on 3 February 2015 in a 0–0 away draw with Borussia Dortmund II.

== Career statistics ==
Appearances and goals by club, season and competition
Club	Season	League			Cup		Continental		Total	
Club	Season	Division	Apps	Goals	Apps	Goals	Apps	Goals	Apps	Goals
Rot Weiss Ahlen II	2006–07	Oberliga Westfalen	3	0	—		—		3	0
VfL Bochum II	2008–09	Regionalliga West	18	0	—		—		18	0
VfL Bochum II	2009–10	Regionalliga West	15	0	—		—		15	0
VfL Bochum II	2010–11	Regionalliga West	15	0	—		—		15	0
VfL Bochum II	2011–12	Regionalliga West	4	0	—		—		4	0
VfL Bochum II	2012–13	Regionalliga West	3	0	—		—		3	0
VfL Bochum II	2013–14	Regionalliga West	4	0	—		—		4	0
VfL Bochum II	Total		59	0	0	0	0	0	59	0
VfL Bochum	2010–11	2. Bundesliga	1	0	0	0	—		1	0
VfL Bochum	2011–12	2. Bundesliga	26	0	2	0	—		28	0
VfL Bochum	2012–13	2. Bundesliga	17	0	2	0	—		19	0
VfL Bochum	2013–14	2. Bundesliga	25	0	2	0	—		27	0
VfL Bochum	Total		69	0	6	0	0	0	75	0
Omonia Nicosia	2014–15	Cypriot First Division	13	0	0	0	6	0	19	0
SV Wehen Wiesbaden	2014–15	3. Liga	15	0	—		—		15	0
SV Wehen Wiesbaden	2015–16	3. Liga	1	0	—		—		1	0
SV Wehen Wiesbaden	Total		16	0	0	0	0	0	16	0
Hallescher FC	2015–16	3. Liga	26	1	—		—		26	1
FSV Zwickau	2016–17	3. Liga	14	0	—		—		14	0
Sportfreunde Lotte	2017–18	3. Liga	6	0	—		—		6	0
FSV Zwickau	2017–18	3. Liga	14	0	—		—		14	0
SC Verl	2018–19	Regionalliga West	9	0	—		—		9	0
SG Wattenscheid 09	2019–20	Regionalliga West	8	0	—		—		8	0
SV Lippstadt	2019–20	Regionalliga West	6	0	—		—		6	0
Career total			243	1	6	0	6	0	255	1
