= Philipp Heerwagen =

German footballer

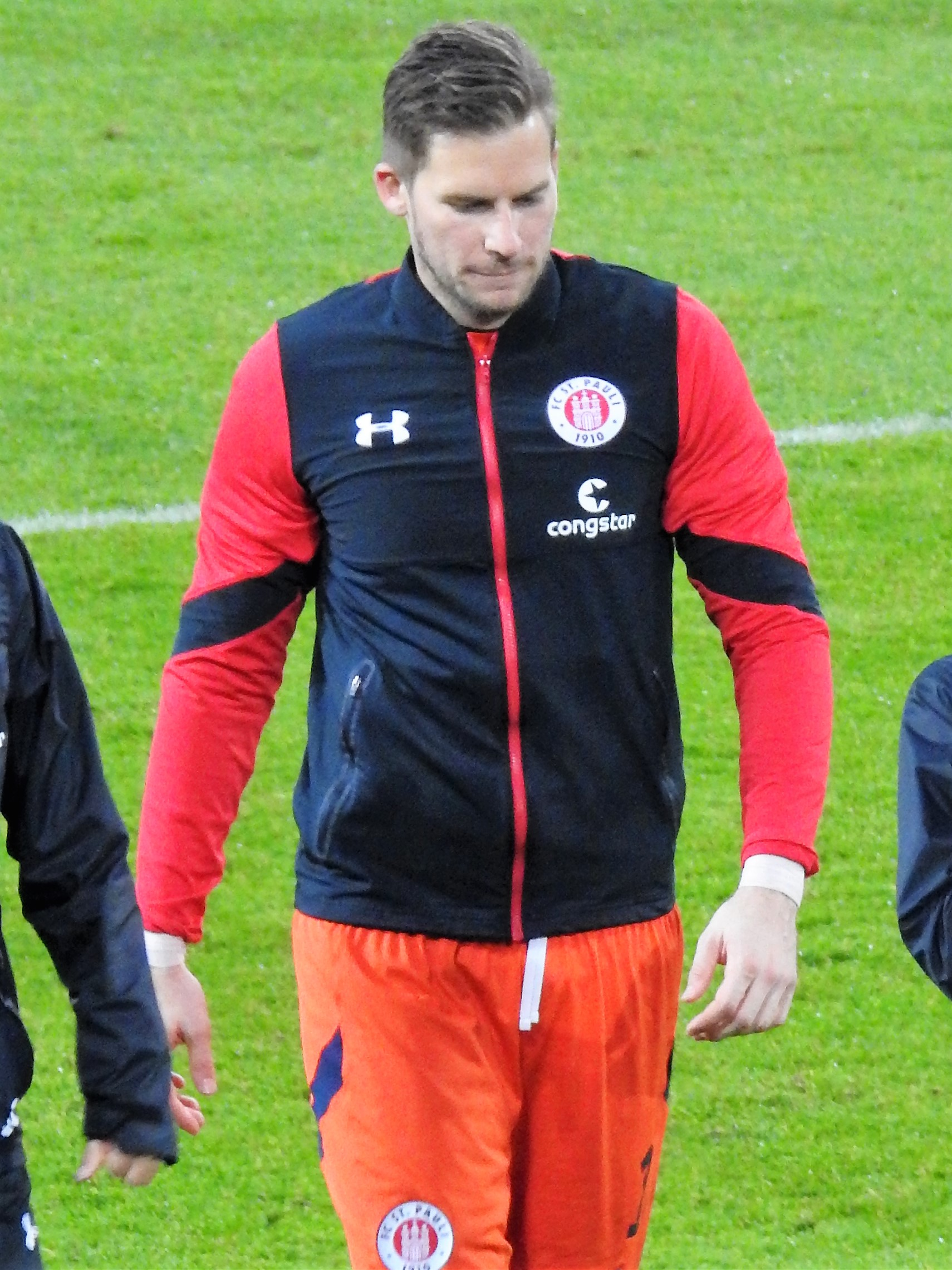
- Heerwagen with FC St. Pauli in 2017

Personal information
- Date of birth: 13 April 1983 (age 43)
- Place of birth: Kelheim, West Germany
- Height: 1.93 m (6 ft 4 in)
- Position: Goalkeeper

Youth career
- 1989–1997: SpVgg Unterhaching
- 1997–2001: Bayern Munich

Senior career*
Years	Team	Apps	(Gls)
2001–2007	SpVgg Unterhaching	151	(0)
2007–2013	VfL Bochum	44	(0)
2012	→ FC St. Pauli (loan)	0	(0)
2013–2018	FC St. Pauli II	26	(0)
2013–2018	FC St. Pauli	22	(0)
2018–2019	FC Ingolstadt	5	(0)
2019–2021	SV Sandhausen	0	(0)
Total		248	(0)

International career
1997	Germany U-17	1	(0)
	Germany U-18	2	(0)
	Germany U-19	1	(0)
- * Club domestic league appearances and goals as of 8 August 2021

Philipp Heerwagen (born 13 April 1983) is a German former professional footballer who played as a goalkeeper.

== Career statistics ==
As of match played 25 November 2018

Appearances and goals by club, season and competition
Club	Season	League			Cup		Other		Total	
Club	Season	Division	Apps	Goals	Apps	Goals	Apps	Goals	Apps	Goals
SpVgg Unterhaching	2002–03	Regionalliga Süd	28	0	4	0	—		32	0
SpVgg Unterhaching	2003–04	2. Bundesliga	22	0	2	0	—		24	0
SpVgg Unterhaching	2004–05	2. Bundesliga	34	0	2	0	—		36	0
SpVgg Unterhaching	2005–06	2. Bundesliga	33	0	3	0	—		36	0
SpVgg Unterhaching	2006–07	2. Bundesliga	34	0	3	0	—		37	0
SpVgg Unterhaching	Total		151	0	14	0	—		165	0
VfL Bochum	2007–08	Bundesliga	0	0	0	0	—		0	0
VfL Bochum	2008–09	Bundesliga	3	0	0	0	—		3	0
VfL Bochum	2009–10	Bundesliga	30	0	1	0	—		31	0
VfL Bochum	2010–11	2. Bundesliga	4	0	1	0	—		5	0
VfL Bochum	2011–12	2. Bundesliga	0	0	0	0	—		0	0
VfL Bochum	2012–13	2. Bundesliga	7	0	1	0	—		8	0
VfL Bochum	Total		44	0	3	0	—		47	0
FC St. Pauli (loan)	2011–12	2. Bundesliga	0	0	—		—		2	0
FC St. Pauli II	2013–14	2. Bundesliga	5	0	—		—		5	0
FC St. Pauli II	2014–15	2. Bundesliga	10	0	—		—		10	0
FC St. Pauli II	2015–16	2. Bundesliga	6	0	—		—		6	0
FC St. Pauli II	2016–17	2. Bundesliga	5	0	—		—		5	0
FC St. Pauli II	Total		26	0	—		—		26	0
FC St. Pauli	2013–14	2. Bundesliga	2	0	—		—		2	0
FC St. Pauli	2014–15	2. Bundesliga	0	0	0	0	—		0	0
FC St. Pauli	2015–16	2. Bundesliga	0	0	0	0	—		0	0
FC St. Pauli	2016–17	2. Bundesliga	20	0	1	0	—		21	0
FC St. Pauli	2017–18	2. Bundesliga	0	0	1	0	—		1	0
FC St. Pauli	Total		22	0	2	0	—		24	0
FC Ingolstadt	2018–19	2. Bundesliga	5	0	0	0	0	0	5	0
SV Sandhausen	2020–21	2. Bundesliga	0	0	0	0	—		0	0
Career total			248	0	19	0	0	0	267	0
