= 2010–11 VfL Bochum season =

VfL Bochum
2010–11 season
- Chairman: Werner Altegoer (until 20 December 2010); Ernst-Otto Stüber (since 20 December 2010)
- Head Coach: Friedhelm Funkel
- Stadium: rewirpowerSTADION
- 2. Bundesliga: 3rd
- Promotion playoff: Runners-up
- DFB-Pokal: First Round
- Top goalscorer: League: Chong (10); All: Chong (10)
- Highest home attendance: 27,448 (vs MSV Duisburg, 15 May 2011)
- Lowest home attendance: 9,186 (vs SC Paderborn 07, 26 November 2010)
- Average home league attendance: 15,053
Home colours	Away colours	Third colours

The 2010–11 VfL Bochum season was the 73rd season in club history.

== Review and events ==
After the season, the club mourned the death of long time club official Ottokar Wüst, who died on 18 June 2011.

== Matches ==
=== Legend ===
Win Draw Loss Postponed

=== Friendly matches ===
10. July 2010 Friendly	VfL Bochum	4 – 3	Kickers Emden	Firrel
16:30 CEST	Prokoph 20'; Kefkir 39'; Marić 53'; Aydin 59'		Djokovic 19'; Nennhuber 62'; Sürer 90'	Attendance: 500; Referee: Lennart Dornieden

16 July 2010 Friendly	Norden/Norddeich-Selection	0 – 3	VfL Bochum	Norddeich
19:00			Federico 21'; Rzatkowski 44'; Aydin 69'	Attendance: 800

17 July 2010 Friendly	VfL Bochum	1 – 0	Iran	Ahaus
16:00	Federico 24'			Stadium: Stadtpark; Attendance: 600

21 July 2010 Friendly	Westfalia Herne	1 – 3	VfL Bochum	Herne
19:00	Gürpinar 86'		Dabrowski 8', 56' (pen.); Aydin 10'	Stadium: Stadion Am Schloss Strünkende; Attendance: 1,500; Referee: Dominik Nowak

24 July 2010 Friendly	Wuppertaler SV Borussia	1 – 1	VfL Bochum	Wuppertal
16:30	Moosmayer 82'		Federico 47'	Stadium: Stadion am Zoo; Attendance: 1,346; Referee: Christian Erbs

28 July 2010 Friendly	MSV Duisburg	1 – 1	VfL Bochum	Duisburg
19:00	Baljak 26'		Chong 19' (pen.)	Stadium: Schauinsland-Reisen-Arena; Attendance: 4,145; Referee: Borsch

31 July 2010 Friendly	VfL Bochum	4 – 2	Getafe CF	Bochum
16:00	Chong 41'; Freier 65'; Šesták 76' (pen.), 84'		Parejo 36'; Miku 88'	Stadium: rewirpowerSTADION; Attendance: 5,122

3 August 2010 Friendly	VfL Bochum	2 – 2	U.S. Città di Palermo	Velden
18:00	Chong 1'; Federico 54'		Hernández 20'; Pastore 69'	Stadium: Waldarena; Attendance: 500; Referee: Manfred Krassnitzer

5 August 2010 Friendly	VfL Bochum	2 – 0	NK Kranj	Velden
17:25	Dedič 37'; Toski (41.)			Stadium: Waldarena; Referee: Manfred Krassnitzer

7 August 2010 Friendly	VfL Bochum	1 – 1	Real Sociedad	Sankt Veit
18:00	Chong 2'		Prieto 56' (pen.)	Attendance: 600; Referee: Bernhard Brugger

30 August 2010 Friendly	SV Phönix Bochum	0 – 14	VfL Bochum	Bochum
18:00			Sağlık 2', 4', 21', 24', 36', 58', 65', 75', 77'; Toski 7'; Johansson 11'; Freier 37'; Kefkir 39', 64'	Stadium: Bezirkssportanlage; Attendance: 400; Referee: Jens Jeromin

3 September 2010 Friendly	TuS Heven 09	0 – 7	VfL Bochum	Witten
18:00			Federico 14', 48', 49'; Sağlık 19'; Toski 44'; Rzatkowski 75'; Prokoph 76'	Stadium: Stockumer Bezirkssportanlage; Attendance: 500; Referee: Dennis Melsa

5 October 2010 Friendly	VfL Bochum	0 – 3	1. FC Köln	Brühl
16:00		report	Chihi 12'; Brosinski 37'; Terodde 45'	Stadium: Schlosspark

8 October 2010 Friendly	1. FC Wülfrath	2 – 7	VfL Bochum	Wülfrath
18:30	Sommer 48'; Kalkala 70'	report	Toski 6'; Sağlık 41', 68', 74', 77' (pen.); Mavraj 80'; Chong 90'	Stadium: Rheinkalk-Stadion am Erbacher Berg; Attendance: 300; Referee: Jonas Höhn

27 October 2010 Friendly	TSG Sprockhövel	0 – 4	VfL Bochum	Hattingen
19:00			Sağlık 20'; Kefkir 77', 84'; Prokoph 88'	Stadium: Sportanlage Wildhagen; Attendance: 600

25 March 2011 Friendly	FC Zürich	1 – 2	VfL Bochum	Rapperswil-Jona
19:00	Fabian 2' (o.g.)		Rzatkowski 50'; Sağlık 83'	Attendance: 1,230; Referee: Wermelinger

30 March 2011 Friendly	Rot-Weiss Essen	0 – 1	VfL Bochum	Essen
19:00			Bönig 40'	Stadium: Georg-Melches-Stadion; Attendance: 1,300

=== 2. Bundesliga ===
23 August 2010 1	VfL Bochum	3 – 2	1860 Munich	Bochum
20:15	Federico 13'; Chong 38', 46'		Rakić 23'; Lauth 59'	Stadium: rewirpowerSTADION; Attendance: 12,118; Referee: Felix Zwayer (Berlin)

27 August 2010 2	Erzgebirge Aue	1 – 0	VfL Bochum	Aue
18:00	Schlitte 14'			Stadium: Erzgebirgsstadion; Attendance: 10,500; Referee: Christian Dingert (Thallichtenberg)

12 September 2010 3	VfL Bochum	0 – 2	FC Augsburg	Bochum
13:30			Thurk 12' de Jong 41'	Stadium: rewirpowerSTADION; Attendance: 14,723; Referee: Peter Gagelmann (Bremen)

18 September 2010 4	Rot-Weiß Oberhausen	3 – 1	VfL Bochum	Oberhausen
13:00	Lamidi 12'; Klinger 79'; Terranova 83'		Yahia 45'	Stadium: Niederrheinstadion; Attendance: 8,561; Referee: Christian Schößling (Leipzig)

22 September 2010 5	VfL Bochum	3 – 1	Arminia Bielefeld	Bochum
17:30	Freier 19'; Dabrowski 40'; Chong 62'		Neuville 29'	Stadium: rewirpowerSTADION; Attendance: 9,831; Referee: Wolfgang Stark (Ergolding)

27 September 2010 6	Fortuna Düsseldorf	0 – 1	VfL Bochum	Düsseldorf
20:15			Chong 22'	Stadium: Esprit Arena; Attendance: 20,400; Referee: Deniz Aytekin (Oberasbach)

2 October 2010 7	VfL Bochum	0 – 2	SpVgg Greuther Fürth	Bochum
13:00			Kleine 58'; Sararer 90+3'	Stadium: rewirpowerSTADION; Attendance: 10,110; Referee: Michael Weiner (Giesen)

16 October 2010 8	Karlsruher SC	0 – 2	VfL Bochum	Karlsruhe
13:00			Chong 24'; Yahia 26'	Stadium: Wildparkstadion; Attendance: 12,177; Referee: Norbert Grudzinski (Hamburg)

24 October 2010 9	VfL Bochum	1 – 1	Alemannia Aachen	Bochum
13:30	Sağlık 14'		Auer 56'	Stadium: rewirpowerSTADION; Attendance: 15,390; Referee: Robert Hartmann (Wangen)

31 October 2010 10	Energie Cottbus	2 – 1	VfL Bochum	Cottbus
13:30	Petersen 56'; Adlung 67'		Jula 28' (o.g.)	Stadium: Stadion der Freundschaft; Attendance: 13,750; Referee: Markus Schmidt (Stuttgart)

5 November 2010 11	VfL Bochum	1 – 0	FSV Frankfurt	Bochum
18:00	Dedič 2'			Stadium: rewirpowerSTADION; Attendance: 10,731; Referee: Robert Kampka (Mainz)

15 November 2010 12	Hertha BSC	2 – 0	VfL Bochum	Berlin
20:15	Lasogga 32', 69'			Stadium: Olympic Stadium; Attendance: 28,973; Referee: Guido Winkmann (Kerken)

20 November 2010 13	VfL Bochum	1 – 4	FC Ingolstadt	Bochum
13:00	Chong 22'		Gerber 2'; Leitl 9', 56', 66'	Stadium: rewirpowerSTADION; Attendance: 9,609; Referee: Thorsten Schriever (Dorum)

26 November 2010 14	VfL Bochum	3 – 0	SC Paderborn	Bochum
18:00	Chong 58'; Dedič 78'; Rzatkowski 80'			Stadium: rewirpowerSTADION; Attendance: 9,186; Referee: Patrick Ittrich (Hamburg)

6 December 2010 15	Union Berlin	0 – 1	VfL Bochum	Berlin
20:15			Dabrowski 18'	Stadium: Stadion An der Alten Försterei; Attendance: 10,899; Referee: Robert Hartmann (Wangen)

12 December 2010 16	VfL Bochum	2 – 1	VfL Osnabrück	Bochum
13:30	Sağlık 68'; Chong 72'		Hansen 18'	Stadium: rewirpowerSTADION; Attendance: 12,465; Referee: Deniz Aytekin (Oberasbach)

17 December 2010 17	MSV Duisburg	0 – 1	VfL Bochum	Duisburg
18:00			Dabrowski 53'	Stadium: Schauinsland-Reisen-Arena; Attendance: 18,027; Referee: Manuel Gräfe (Berlin)

15 January 2011 18	1860 Munich	1 – 3	VfL Bochum	Munich
13:00	Lauth 72'		Dedič 45' (pen.); Aydın 78'; Dabrowski 83'	Stadium: Allianz Arena; Attendance: 16,150; Referee: Tobias Welz (Wiesbaden)

24 January 2011 19	VfL Bochum	2 – 0	Erzgebirge Aue	Bochum
20:15	Chong 88'; Federico 90+1'			Stadium: rewirpowerSTADION; Attendance: 11,785; Referee: Knut Kircher (Rottenburg)

31 January 2011 20	FC Augsburg	0 – 1	VfL Bochum	Augsburg
20:15			Federico 84'	Stadium: Impuls Arena; Attendance: 15,483; Referee: Bibiana Steinhaus (Hannover)

6 February 2011 21	VfL Bochum	2 – 1	Rot-Weiß Oberhausen	Bochum
13:30	Korkmaz 16'; Federico 87'		König 8'	Stadium: rewirpowerSTADION; Attendance: 16,672; Referee: Marco Fritz (Korb)

13 February 2011 22	Arminia Bielefeld	2 – 2	VfL Bochum	Bielefeld
13:30	Quaner 35'; Appiah 89'		Aydın 14', 73'	Stadium: Schüco Arena; Attendance: 17,532; Referee: Tobias Christ (Münchweiler)

18 February 2011 23	VfL Bochum	2 – 0	Fortuna Düsseldorf	Bochum
18:00	Maltritz 24' (pen.); Korkmaz 58'			Stadium: rewirpowerSTADION; Attendance: 24,100; Referee: Deniz Aytekin (Oberasbach)

27 February 2011 24	SpVgg Greuther Fürth	1 – 1	VfL Bochum	Fürth
13:30	Kaplan 78'		Aydın 2'	Stadium: Trolli Arena; Attendance: 8,260; Referee: Tobias Welz (Wiesbaden)

5 March 2011 25	VfL Bochum	1 – 1	Karlsruher SC	Bochum
13:00	Chong 85'		Chrisantus 78'	Stadium: rewirpowerSTADION; Attendance: 14,684; Referee: Thomas Metzen (Mechernich)

13 March 2011 26	Alemannia Aachen	1 – 3	VfL Bochum	Aachen
13:30	Arslan 26'		Azaouagh 15'; Korkmaz 55'; Maltritz 85' (pen.)	Stadium: New Tivoli; Attendance: 19,013; Referee: Felix Brych (Munich)

21 March 2011 27	VfL Bochum	1 – 0	Energie Cottbus	Bochum
20:15	Federico 70'			Stadium: rewirpowerSTADION; Attendance: 16,558; Referee: Peter Sippel (Munich)

4 April 2011 28	FSV Frankfurt	0 – 1	VfL Bochum	Frankfurt am Main
20:15			Azaouagh 18'	Stadium: Volksbank Stadion; Attendance: 5,769; Referee: Patrick Ittrich (Hamburg)

11 April 2011 29	VfL Bochum	0 – 2	Hertha BSC	Bochum
20:15			Niemeyer 23'; Raffael 87'	Stadium: rewirpowerSTADION; Attendance: 24,211; Referee: Günter Perl (Pullach)

15 April 2011 30	FC Ingolstadt	3 – 0	VfL Bochum	Ingolstadt
18:00	Mo. Hartmann 1'; Karl 31'; Leitl 60'			Stadium: Audi Sportpark; Attendance: 10,881; Referee: Frank Willenborg (Osnabrück)

21 April 2011 31	SC Paderborn	0 – 0	VfL Bochum	Paderborn
18:00				Stadium: Energieteam Arena; Attendance: 10,369; Referee: Tobias Welz (Wiesbaden)

29 April 2011 32	VfL Bochum	3 – 0	Union Berlin	Bochum
18:00	Aydın 11', 73'; Freier 55'			Stadium: rewirpowerSTADION; Attendance: 16,009; Referee: Norbert Grudzinski (Hamburg)

8 May 2011 33	VfL Osnabrück	1 – 3	VfL Bochum	Osnabrück
13:30	Pauli 82'		Federico 23'; Maltritz 90+1'; Sağlık 90+3'	Stadium: Osnatel-Arena; Attendance: 16,200; Referee: Christian Schößling (Leipzig)

15 May 2011 34	VfL Bochum	3 – 1	MSV Duisburg	Bochum
13:30	Aydın 9', 87'; Federico 82'		Exslager 89'	Stadium: rewirpowerSTADION; Attendance: 27,448; Referee: Peter Sippel (Munich)

==== Promotion playoff ====
19 May 2011 1st leg	Borussia Mönchengladbach	1 – 0	VfL Bochum	Mönchengladbach
20:30	De Camargo 90+3'			Stadium: Borussia-Park; Attendance: 54,057; Referee: Günter Perl (Pullach)

25 May 2011 2nd leg	VfL Bochum	1 – 1 (1 – 2 agg.)	Borussia Mönchengladbach	Bochum
20:30	Nordtveit 24' (o.g.)		Reus 72'	Stadium: rewirpowerSTADION; Attendance: 28,650; Referee: Peter Gagelmann (Bremen)

=== DFB-Pokal ===
15 August 2010 Round 1	Kickers Offenbach	3 – 0	VfL Bochum	Offenbach
17:30	Feldhahn 34'; Haas 45'; Berger 83'			Stadium: Stadion am Bieberer Berg; Attendance: 12,026; Referee: Robert Hartmann (Wangen)

== Squad ==
=== Squad and statistics ===
==== Squad, appearances and goals scored ====
No.	Pos	Nat	Player	Total		2. Bundesliga		Promotion playoff		DFB-Pokal	
No.	Pos	Nat	Player	Apps	Goals	Apps	Goals	Apps	Goals	Apps	Goals
1	GK	(Germany) GER	Philipp Heerwagen	5	0	4	0	0	0	1	0
2	DF	(Germany) GER	Björn Kopplin	35	0	34	0	1	0	0	0
3	DF	(Germany) GER	Patrick Fabian	6	0	6	0	0	0	0	0
4	DF	(Germany) GER	Marcel Maltritz (vice-captain)	35	3	32	3	2	0	1	0
5	MF	(Germany) GER	Christoph Dabrowski (captain)	32	4	29	4	2	0	1	0
7	MF	(Germany) GER	Paul Freier	21	2	18	2	2	0	1	0
8	MF	(Sweden) SWE	Andreas Johansson	28	0	26	0	2	0	0	0
9	FW	(North Korea) PRK	Chong Tese	27	10	25	10	1	0	1	0
10	MF	(Serbia) SRB	Miloš Marić (until 31 December 2010)	9	0	8	0	0	0	1	0
11	FW	(Turkey) TUR	Mahir Sağlık	28	3	26	3	1	0	1	0
14	MF	(Germany) GER	Faton Toski	20	0	17	0	2	0	1	0
15	FW	(Germany) GER	Roman Prokoph	11	0	10	0	0	0	1	0
16	MF	(Germany) GER	Kevin Vogt	21	0	21	0	0	0	0	0
17	MF	(Germany) GER	Oğuzhan Kefkir	1	0	1	0	0	0	0	0
18	MF	(Italy) ITA	Giovanni Federico (vice-captain)	32	7	29	7	2	0	1	0
19	MF	(Germany) GER	Dennis Grote (until 1 January 2011)	8	0	7	0	0	0	1	0
20	MF	(Austria) AUT	Ümit Korkmaz (since 26 January 2011)	13	3	12	3	1	0	0	0
20	DF	(Germany) GER	Mërgim Mavraj (until 19 January 2011)	13	0	13	0	0	0	0	0
21	DF	(France) FRA	Marc Pfertzel (until 13 January 2011)	4	0	3	0	0	0	1	0
22	FW	(Germany) GER	Mirkan Aydın	17	8	15	8	2	0	0	0
23	MF	(Germany) GER	Marc Rzatkowski	4	1	4	1	0	0	0	0
24	DF	(Germany) GER	Philipp Bönig	7	0	6	0	0	0	1	0
25	DF	(Algeria) ALG	Antar Yahia	30	2	28	2	2	0	0	0
26	GK	(Germany) GER	Andreas Luthe	32	0	30	0	2	0	0	0
27	FW	(Slovenia) SLO	Zlatko Dedič	23	3	22	3	1	0	0	0
28	DF	(Sweden) SWE	Matias Concha	10	0	10	0	0	0	0	0
29	MF	(Germany) GER	Mimoun Azaouagh (since 15 January 2011)	15	2	13	2	2	0	0	0
31	GK	(Germany) GER	Michael Esser	0	0	0	0	0	0	0	0
33	DF	(Germany) GER	Philip Semlits	0	0	0	0	0	0	0	0
35	DF	(Germany) GER	Matthias Ostrzolek (since 12 December 2010)	19	0	17	0	2	0	0	0
37	DF	(Germany) GER	Jonas Acquistapace (since 21 April 2011)	1	0	1	0	0	0	0	0

==== Minutes played ====
No.	Nat	Pos	Player	Total	2. Bundesliga	Promotion playoff	DFB-Pokal
1	(Germany)	GK	Philipp Heerwagen	450	360	0	90
2	(Germany)	DF	Björn Kopplin	3048	2958	90	0
3	(Germany)	DF	Patrick Fabian	101	101	0	0
4	(Germany)	DF	Marcel Maltritz	2881	2611	180	90
5	(Germany)	MF	Christoph Dabrowski	2869	2599	180	90
7	(Germany)	MF	Paul Freier	1481	1241	180	60
8	(Sweden)	MF	Andreas Johansson	2166	1986	180	0
9	(North Korea)	FW	Chong Tese	1783	1665	44	74
10	(Serbia)	MF	Miloš Marić	702	643	0	59
11	(Turkey)	FW	Mahir Sağlık	1529	1484	15	30
14	(Germany)	MF	Faton Toski	1044	840	173	31
15	(Germany)	FW	Roman Prokoph	270	254	0	16
16	(Germany)	MF	Kevin Vogt	1587	1587	0	0
17	(Germany)	MF	Oğuzhan Kefkir	2	2	0	0
18	(Italy)	MF	Giovanni Federico	1806	1670	46	90
19	(Germany)	MF	Dennis Grote	534	444	0	90
20	(Austria)	MF	Ümit Korkmaz	923	852	71	0
20	(Germany)	DF	Mërgim Mavraj	1228	1138	0	90
21	(France)	DF	Marc Pfertzel	204	114	0	90
22	(Germany)	FW	Mirkan Aydın	1114	978	136	0
23	(Germany)	MF	Marc Rzatkowski	239	239	0	0
24	(Germany)	DF	Philipp Bönig	322	232	0	90
25	(Algeria)	DF	Antar Yahia	2611	2431	180	0
26	(Germany)	GK	Andreas Luthe	2880	2700	180	0
27	(Slovenia)	FW	Zlatko Dedič	1209	1134	75	0
28	(Sweden)	DF	Matias Concha	851	851	0	0
29	(Germany)	MF	Mimoun Azaouagh	993	923	70	0
31	(Germany)	GK	Michael Esser	0	0	0	0
33	(Germany)	DF	Philip Semlits	0	0	0	0
35	(Germany)	DF	Matthias Ostrzolek	1597	1417	180	0
37	(Germany)	DF	Jonas Acquistapace	90	90	0	0

==== Bookings ====
Players				Total			2. Bundesliga			Promotion playoff			DFB-Pokal		
No.	Nat	Pos	Name	Yellow card	(yellow card) (red card)	Red card	Yellow card	(yellow card) (red card)	Red card	Yellow card	(yellow card) (red card)	Red card	Yellow card	(yellow card) (red card)	Red card
1	(Germany)	GK	Philipp Heerwagen	0	0	0	0	0	0	0	0	0	0	0	0
2	(Germany)	DF	Björn Kopplin	5	0	0	4	0	0	1	0	0	0	0	0
3	(Germany)	DF	Patrick Fabian	0	0	0	0	0	0	0	0	0	0	0	0
4	(Germany)	DF	Marcel Maltritz	4	0	0	4	0	0	0	0	0	0	0	0
5	(Germany)	MF	Christoph Dabrowski	13	1	0	11	1	0	1	0	0	1	0	0
7	(Germany)	MF	Paul Freier	3	1	0	3	1	0	0	0	0	0	0	0
8	(Sweden)	MF	Andreas Johansson	2	0	0	2	0	0	0	0	0	0	0	0
9	(North Korea)	FW	Chong Tese	6	0	0	6	0	0	0	0	0	0	0	0
10	(Serbia)	MF	Miloš Marić	0	0	0	0	0	0	0	0	0	0	0	0
11	(Turkey)	FW	Mahir Sağlık	6	0	0	5	0	0	0	0	0	1	0	0
14	(Germany)	MF	Faton Toski	4	0	0	2	0	0	1	0	0	1	0	0
15	(Germany)	FW	Roman Prokoph	1	0	0	1	0	0	0	0	0	0	0	0
16	(Germany)	MF	Kevin Vogt	4	0	0	4	0	0	0	0	0	0	0	0
17	(Germany)	MF	Oğuzhan Kefkir	0	0	0	0	0	0	0	0	0	0	0	0
18	(Italy)	MF	Giovanni Federico	5	0	0	4	0	0	0	0	0	1	0	0
19	(Germany)	MF	Dennis Grote	3	0	0	2	0	0	0	0	0	1	0	0
20	(Austria)	MF	Ümit Korkmaz	0	0	0	0	0	0	0	0	0	0	0	0
20	(Germany)	DF	Mërgim Mavraj	3	0	0	2	0	0	0	0	0	1	0	0
21	(France)	DF	Marc Pfertzel	0	0	0	0	0	0	0	0	0	0	0	0
22	(Germany)	FW	Mirkan Aydın	3	0	0	2	0	0	1	0	0	0	0	0
23	(Germany)	MF	Marc Rzatkowski	2	0	0	2	0	0	0	0	0	0	0	0
24	(Germany)	DF	Philipp Bönig	0	0	0	0	0	0	0	0	0	0	0	0
25	(Algeria)	DF	Antar Yahia	4	1	0	4	1	0	0	0	0	0	0	0
26	(Germany)	GK	Andreas Luthe	4	0	0	4	0	0	0	0	0	0	0	0
27	(Slovenia)	FW	Zlatko Dedič	0	0	0	0	0	0	0	0	0	0	0	0
28	(Sweden)	DF	Matias Concha	0	0	0	0	0	0	0	0	0	0	0	0
29	(Germany)	MF	Mimoun Azaouagh	2	0	0	2	0	0	0	0	0	0	0	0
31	(Germany)	GK	Michael Esser	0	0	0	0	0	0	0	0	0	0	0	0
33	(Germany)	DF	Philip Semlits	0	0	0	0	0	0	0	0	0	0	0	0
35	(Germany)	DF	Matthias Ostrzolek	7	2	0	5	2	0	2	0	0	0	0	0
37	(Germany)	DF	Jonas Acquistapace	0	0	0	0	0	0	0	0	0	0	0	0
Totals				81	5	0	69	5	0	6	0	0	6	0	0

=== Transfers ===
==== Summer ====
In:

No.	Pos.	Nation	Player
2	DF	GER	Björn Kopplin (from Bayern Munich II)
9	FW	PRK	Chong Tese (from Kawasaki Frontale)
11	FW	TUR	Mahir Sağlık (from VfL Wolfsburg, previously on loan at SC Paderborn)
14	MF	GER	Faton Toski (from Eintracht Frankfurt)
17	MF	GER	Oguzhan Kefkir (from VfL Bochum U-19)
18	MF	ITA	Giovanni Federico (from Arminia Bielefeld)
23	MF	GER	Marc Rzatkowski (from VfL Bochum II)
31	GK	GER	Michael Esser (from VfL Bochum II)
33	MF	GER	Philip Semlits (from VfL Bochum II)

Out:

No.	Pos.	Nation	Player
9	FW	SVK	Stanislav Sestak (on loan to Ankaragücü)
10	MF	CMR	Joël Epalle (to FK Baku)
14	FW	ARG	Diego Klimowicz (retired)
16	FW	IRI	Vahid Hashemian (released)
17	MF	GER	Lewis Holtby (loan return to Schalke 04)
22	MF	GER	Mimoun Azaouagh (to VfL Bochum II)
27	DF	AUT	Christian Fuchs (on loan to Mainz 05)
30	GK	POR	Daniel Fernandes (on loan to Panathinaikos, previously on loan at Iraklis)
31	GK	GER	René Renno (to Energie Cottbus)
--	MF	CRO	Ivo Iličević (to 1. FC Kaiserslautern, previously on loan)

==== Winter ====
In:

No.	Pos.	Nation	Player
20	MF	AUT	Ümit Korkmaz (on loan from Eintracht Frankfurt)
29	MF	GER	Mimoun Azaouagh (from VfL Bochum II)
35	DF	GER	Matthias Ostrzolek (from VfL Bochum II)

Out:

No.	Pos.	Nation	Player
10	MF	SRB	Miloš Marić (to Lierse)
19	MF	GER	Dennis Grote (to Rot-Weiß Oberhausen)
20	DF	GER	Mërgim Mavraj (to SpVgg Greuther Fürth)
21	DF	FRA	Marc Pfertzel (to Kavala)
