= 2008–09 VfL Bochum season =

VfL Bochum
2008–09 season
- Chairman: Werner Altegoer
- Head Coach: Marcel Koller
- Stadium: rewirpowerSTADION
- Bundesliga: 14th
- DFB-Pokal: Second round
- Top goalscorer: League: Šesták (9); All: Šesták (10)
- Highest home attendance: 31,328 (vs Borussia Mönchengladbach, 17 October 2008; vs FC Bayern Munich, 14 March 2009; vs Borussia Dortmund, 18 April 2009)
- Lowest home attendance: 18,103 (vs Energie Cottbus, 28 February 2009)
- Average home league attendance: 25,515
Home colours	Away colours	Third colours

The 2008–09 VfL Bochum season was the 71st season in club history.

The team finished in 14th place in the Bundesliga league, after playing 34 league matches, of which they only won seven matches.

== Matches ==
=== Legend ===
Win Draw Loss

=== Bundesliga ===
16 August 2008 1	Karlsruher SC	1–0	VfL Bochum	Karlsruhe
15:30	Eichner 30'			Stadium: Wildparkstadion; Attendance: 24,800; Referee: Michael Weiner (Giesen)

24 August 2008 2	VfL Bochum	2–2	VfL Wolfsburg	Bochum
17:00	Šesták 12'; Dabrowski 50'		Costa 51'; Sağlık 69'	Stadium: rewirpowerSTADION; Attendance: 20,836; Referee: Michael Kempter (Sauldorf)

30 August 2008 3	Schalke 04	1–0	VfL Bochum	Gelsenkirchen
15:30	Westermann 36'			Stadium: Veltins-Arena; Attendance: 61,673; Referee: Wolfgang Stark (Ergolding)

14 September 2008 4	VfL Bochum	2–0	Arminia Bielefeld	Bochum
17:00	Mięciel 22'; Pfertzel 26'			Stadium: rewirpowerSTADION; Attendance: 20,739; Referee: Peter Gagelmann (Bremen)

20 September 2008 5	Energie Cottbus	1–1	VfL Bochum	Cottbus
15:30	Sørensen 13'		Yahia 48'	Stadium: Stadion der Freundschaft; Attendance: 12,174; Referee: Florian Meyer (Burgdorf)

27 September 2008 6	VfL Bochum	2–3	Bayer Leverkusen	Bochum
15:30	Šesták 79'; Kaloğlu 81'		Vidal 6'; Augusto 21'; Helmes 61'	Stadium: rewirpowerSTADION; Attendance: 24,843; Referee: Jochen Drees (Münster-Sarmsheim)

4 October 2008 7	Bayern Munich	3–3	VfL Bochum	Munich
15:30	Van Buyten 15'; Zé Roberto 45', 68'		Kaloğlu 29'; Dabrowski 83'; Grote 85'	Stadium: Allianz Arena; Attendance: 69,000; Referee: Babak Rafati (Hannover)

17 October 2008 8	VfL Bochum	2–2	Borussia Mönchengladbach	Bochum
20:30	Dabrowski 55'; Kaloğlu 77'		Gohouri 30'; Kleine 79'	Stadium: rewirpowerSTADION; Attendance: 31,328; Referee: Helmut Fleischer (Ulm)

26 October 2008 9	VfB Stuttgart	2–0	VfL Bochum	Stuttgart
17:00	Gómez 80', 83'			Stadium: Gottlieb-Daimler-Stadion; Attendance: 43,000; Referee: Manuel Gräfe (Berlin)

29 October 2008 10	VfL Bochum	1–3	1899 Hoffenheim	Bochum
20:00	Grote 2'		Ba 64'; Ibišević 70' (pen.); Carlos Eduardo 71'	Stadium: rewirpowerSTADION; Attendance: 24,444; Referee: Peter Gagelmann (Bremen)

2 November 2008 11	Borussia Dortmund	1–1	VfL Bochum	Dortmund
17:00	Zidan 44'		Zdebel 27'	Stadium: Signal Iduna Park; Attendance: 71,600; Referee: Knut Kircher (Rottenburg)

8 November 2008 12	VfL Bochum	0–0	Werder Bremen	Bochum
15:30				Stadium: rewirpowerSTADION; Attendance: 27,237; Referee: Deniz Aytekin (Oberasbach)

14 November 2008 13	Hannover 96	1–1	VfL Bochum	Hannover
20:30	Schlaudraff 62'		Fromlowitz 66' (o.g.)	Stadium: AWD-Arena; Attendance: 30,827; Referee: Michael Kempter (Sauldorf)

22 November 2008 14	VfL Bochum	2–3	Hertha BSC	Bochum
15:30	Šesták 50'; Mięciel 74'		Raffael 25'; Kačar 33'; Cícero 39'	Stadium: rewirpowerSTADION; Attendance: 18,248; Referee: Michael Weiner (Giesen)

30 November 2008 15	VfL Bochum	1–1	Hamburger SV	Bochum
17:00	Šesták 39'		Olić 70'	Stadium: rewirpowerSTADION; Attendance: 23,157; Referee: Felix Brych (Munich)

6 December 2008 16	Eintracht Frankfurt	4–0	VfL Bochum	Frankfurt am Main
15:30	Liberopoulos 7' (pen.), 43'; Steinhöfer 62'; Russ 64'			Stadium: Commerzbank-Arena; Attendance: 39,400; Referee: Markus Schmidt (Stuttgart)

13 December 2008 17	VfL Bochum	1–2	1. FC Köln	Bochum
15:30	Dabrowski 58'		McKenna 44'; Ishiaku 87'	Stadium: rewirpowerSTADION; Attendance: 30,208; Referee: Jochen Drees (Münster-Sarmsheim)

1 February 2009 18	VfL Bochum	2–0	Karlsruher SC	Bochum
17:00	C. Fuchs 26'; Klimowicz 65'			Stadium: rewirpowerSTADION; Attendance: 20,148; Referee: Peter Sippel (Munich)

7 February 2009 19	VfL Wolfsburg	2–0	VfL Bochum	Wolfsburg
15:30	Džeko 21', 85'			Stadium: Volkswagen Arena; Attendance: 26,177; Referee: Deniz Aytekin (Oberasbach)

14 February 2009 20	VfL Bochum	2–1	Schalke 04	Bochum
15:30	Azaouagh 44'; Dabrowski 57'		Kurányi 18'	Stadium: rewirpowerSTADION; Attendance: 30,605; Referee: Knut Kircher (Rottenburg)

21 February 2009 21	Arminia Bielefeld	1–1	VfL Bochum	Bielefeld
15:30	Mijatović 83'		Klimowicz 30'	Stadium: Schüco Arena; Attendance: 20,200; Referee: Lutz Wagner (Kriftel)

28 February 2009 22	VfL Bochum	3–2	Energie Cottbus	Bochum
15:30	Epalle 12'; C. Fuchs 54'; Pfertzel 79' (pen.)		Iliev 2'; Jula 50'	Stadium: rewirpowerSTADION; Attendance: 18,103; Referee: Markus Schmidt (Stuttgart)

8 March 2009 23	Bayer Leverkusen	1–1	VfL Bochum	Düsseldorf
17:00	Helmes 66' (pen.)		Dabrowski 32'	Stadium: LTU Arena; Attendance: 26,000; Referee: Wolfgang Stark (Ergolding)

14 March 2009 24	VfL Bochum	0–3	Bayern Munich	Bochum
15:30			Zé Roberto 32'; Lahm 60'; Demichelis 90'	Stadium: rewirpowerSTADION; Attendance: 31,328; Referee: Michael Weiner (Giesen)

20 March 2009 25	Borussia Mönchengladbach	0–1	VfL Bochum	Mönchengladbach
20:30			Grote 29'	Stadium: Borussia-Park; Attendance: 49,282; Referee: Manuel Gräfe (Berlin)

4 April 2009 26	VfL Bochum	1–2	VfB Stuttgart	Bochum
15:30	Epalle 48'		Cacau 58'; Tasci 89'	Stadium: rewirpowerSTADION; Attendance: 24,718; Referee: Helmut Fleischer (Ulm)

11 April 2009 27	1899 Hoffenheim	0–3	VfL Bochum	Sinsheim
15:30			Šesták 42', 55', 69'	Stadium: Rhein-Neckar Arena; Attendance: 30,150; Referee: Babak Rafati (Hannover)

18 April 2009 28	VfL Bochum	0–2	Borussia Dortmund	Bochum
15:30			Owomoyela 11'; Valdez 54'	Stadium: rewirpowerSTADION; Attendance: 31,328; Referee: Peter Sippel (Munich)

25 April 2009 29	Werder Bremen	3–2	VfL Bochum	Bremen
15:30	Almeida 54'; Naldo 70'; Diego 79'		Šesták 16', 44'	Stadium: Weserstadion; Attendance: 39,303; Referee: Günter Perl (Pullach)

1 May 2009 30	VfL Bochum	0–2	Hannover 96	Bochum
20:30			Bruggink 12'; Balitsch 32'	Stadium: rewirpowerSTADION; Attendance: 26,072; Referee: Knut Kircher (Rottenburg)

9 May 2009 31	Hertha BSC	2–0	VfL Bochum	Berlin
15:30	Pantelić 39'; Raffael 50'			Stadium: Olympiastadion; Attendance: 71,323; Referee: Helmut Fleischer (Ulm)

13 May 2009 32	Hamburger SV	3–1	VfL Bochum	Hamburg
20:00	Guerrero 15'; Olić 33', 58'		Freier 71'	Stadium: HSH Nordbank Arena; Attendance: 47,942; Referee: Wolfgang Stark (Ergolding)

16 May 2009 33	VfL Bochum	2–0	Eintracht Frankfurt	Bochum
15:30	Hashemian 26'; Klimowicz 72'			Stadium: rewirpowerSTADION; Attendance: 30,420; Referee: Felix Brych (Munich)

23 May 2009 34	1. FC Köln	1–1	VfL Bochum	Cologne
15:30	Yahia 24' (o.g.)		Klimowicz 18'	Stadium: RheinEnergieStadion; Attendance: 50,000; Referee: Peter Gagelmann (Bremen)

=== DFB-Pokal ===
8 August 2008 R1	Preußen Münster	0–0 (a.e.t.) (5–6 p)	VfL Bochum	Münster
20:30				Stadium: Preußenstadion; Attendance: 15,050; Referee: Peter Gagelmann (Bremen)
	Penalties
	Özkara (penalty missed); Wissing (penalty scored); Ivičević (penalty scored); Loose (penalty scored); Lauretta (penalty scored); Talarek (penalty scored); Remmert (penalty missed)		Maltritz (penalty scored); Šesták (penalty scored); Pfertzel (penalty scored); Ono (penalty missed); Hashemian (penalty scored); C. Fuchs (penalty scored); Yahia (penalty scored)

24 September 2008 R2	Hamburger SV	2–0	VfL Bochum	Hamburg
19:00	Petrić 9', 90+2'			Stadium: HSH Nordbank Arena; Attendance: 33,820; Referee: Peter Sippel (Munich)

== Squad ==
=== Squad and statistics ===
==== Squad, appearances and goals scored ====
No.	Pos	Nat	Player	Total		Bundesliga		DFB-Pokal	
No.	Pos	Nat	Player	Apps	Goals	Apps	Goals	Apps	Goals
1	GK	(Portugal) POR	Daniel Fernandes	33	0	31	0	2	0
2	DF	(Sweden) SWE	Matias Concha	15	0	15	0	0	0
4	DF	(Germany) GER	Marcel Maltritz	30	1	28	0	2	1
5	MF	(Germany) GER	Christoph Dabrowski	32	6	31	6	1	0
6	DF	(Austria) AUT	Christian Fuchs	24	3	22	2	2	1
7	MF	(Germany) GER	Paul Freier	29	1	28	1	1	0
8	MF	(Poland) POL	Tomasz Zdebel (until 31 December 2008)	14	1	12	1	2	0
9	FW	(Slovakia) SVK	Stanislav Šesták	26	10	24	9	2	1
10	FW	(Cameroon) CMR	Joël Epalle	22	2	22	2	0	0
11	FW	(Poland) POL	Marcin Mięciel	14	2	12	2	2	0
13	MF	(Germany) GER	Danny Fuchs (until 31 December 2008)	1	0	1	0	0	0
14	FW	(Argentina) ARG	Diego Klimowicz (since 4 January 2009)	11	4	11	4	0	0
15	MF	(Canada) CAN	Daniel Imhof	25	0	24	0	1	0
16	FW	(Iran) IRN	Vahid Hashemian	18	2	16	1	2	1
17	FW	(Turkey) TUR	Sinan Kaloğlu	19	3	18	3	1	0
18	MF	(Germany) GER	Oliver Schröder	13	0	13	0	0	0
19	MF	(Germany) GER	Dennis Grote	21	3	20	3	1	0
20	DF	(Germany) GER	Mërgim Mavraj	23	0	23	0	0	0
21	DF	(France) FRA	Marc Pfertzel	29	3	27	2	2	1
22	MF	(Germany) GER	Mimoun Azaouagh	32	1	30	1	2	0
23	MF	(Japan) JPN	Shinji Ono	10	0	8	0	2	0
24	DF	(Germany) GER	Philipp Bönig	19	0	18	0	1	0
25	DF	(Algeria) ALG	Antar Yahia	26	2	24	1	2	1
26	MF	(Germany) GER	Heinrich Schmidtgal	0	0	0	0	0	0
27	GK	(Germany) GER	Andreas Lengsfeld	0	0	0	0	0	0
28	MF	(Germany) GER	David Zajas	0	0	0	0	0	0
29	MF	(Turkey) TUR	Dilaver Güçlü	0	0	0	0	0	0
30	DF	(Germany) GER	Patrick Fabian	5	0	5	0	0	0
31	GK	(Germany) GER	René Renno	1	0	1	0	0	0
32	GK	(Germany) GER	Philipp Heerwagen	3	0	3	0	0	0
35	MF	(Germany) GER	İlkay Gündoğan (until 31 January 2009)	0	0	0	0	0	0
36	MF	(Germany) GER	Jürgen Duah	0	0	0	0	0	0
37	FW	(Germany) GER	Sami El-Nounou	0	0	0	0	0	0
38	FW	(Germany) GER	Roman Prokoph	0	0	0	0	0	0
40	MF	(Germany) GER	Kevin Vogt (since 1 January 2009)	1	0	1	0	0	0

=== Transfers ===
==== Summer ====
In:

No.	Pos.	Nation	Player
1	GK	POR	Daniel Fernandes (from PAOK)
6	DF	AUT	Christian Fuchs (from SV Mattersburg)
7	MF	GER	Paul Freier (from Bayer Leverkusen)
16	FW	IRN	Vahid Hashemian (from Hannover 96)
17	FW	TUR	Sinan Kaloğlu (from Bursaspor)
22	MF	GER	Mimoun Azaouagh (from Schalke 04, previously on loan)
27	GK	GER	Andreas Lengsfeld (from Jahn Regensburg)
29	FW	TUR	Dilaver Güçlü (from VfL Bochum II)
36	MF	GER	Jürgen Duah (from VfL Bochum II)
38	FW	GER	Roman Prokoph (from VfL Bochum II)
37	FW	GER	Sami El-Nounou (from VfL Bochum II)

Out:

No.	Pos.	Nation	Player
3	DF	GER	Martin Meichelbeck (to Greuther Fürth)
6	DF	CZE	Pavel Drsek (to Panionios)
7	FW	DEN	Tommy Bechmann (to SC Freiburg)
14	FW	GER	Benjamin Auer (to Alemannia Aachen)
16	FW	AUT	Marc Sand (on loan to Austria Wien)
17	FW	UKR	Oleksiy Byelik (loan return to Shakhtar Donetsk)
27	GK	CZE	Jan Laštůvka (loan return to Shakhtar Donetsk)

==== Winter ====
In:

No.	Pos.	Nation	Player
14	FW	ARG	Diego Klimowicz (from Borussia Dortmund)
40	MF	GER	Kevin Vogt (from VfL Bochum U-19)

Out:

No.	Pos.	Nation	Player
8	MF	POL	Tomasz Zdebel (to Bayer Leverkusen)
13	MF	GER	Danny Fuchs (on loan to 1. FC Kaiserslautern)
35	MF	GER	İlkay Gündoğan (to 1. FC Nürnberg)
--	FW	AUT	Marc Sand (to Austria Kärnten, previously on loan to Austria Wien)

== VfL Bochum II ==
No.	Pos	Nat	Player	Total		Regionalliga West	
No.	Pos	Nat	Player	Apps	Goals	Apps	Goals
	DF	(Germany) GER	Jonas Acquistapace	18	0	18	0
	MF	(Germany) GER	Mirkan Aydın	29	4	29	4
	MF	(Germany) GER	Jürgen Duah	32	1	32	1
	FW	(Germany) GER	Sami El-Nounou	26	11	26	11
	GK	(Germany) GER	Michael Esser	1	0	1	0
	DF	(Germany) GER	Patrick Fabian	17	0	17	0
	MF	(Germany) GER	Paul Freier	2	0	2	0
	MF	(Germany) GER	Danny Fuchs	3	1	3	1
	MF	(Germany) GER	Dennis Grote	4	1	4	1
	FW	(Turkey) TUR	Dilaver Güçlü	25	5	25	5
	MF	(Germany) GER	İlkay Gündoğan (until 31 January 2009)	2	1	2	1
	FW	(Germany) GER	Mike Hibbeln	9	0	9	0
	DF	(Germany) GER	Christian Kalina	15	0	15	0
	DF	(Germany) GER	Daniel Klinger	24	0	24	0
	FW	(Tunisia) TUN	Mohamed Labiadh	4	0	4	0
	GK	(Germany) GER	Andreas Lengsfeld	6	0	6	0
	GK	(Germany) GER	Andreas Luthe	21	0	21	0
	DF	(Germany) GER	Marcel Maltritz	1	0	1	0
	DF	(Germany) GER	Christian Mäscher	23	0	23	0
	DF	(Germany) GER	Mërgim Mavraj	1	0	1	0
	FW	(Germany) GER	Alexander Neumann	23	5	23	5
	FW	(Germany) GER	Roman Prokoph	31	12	31	12
	GK	(Germany) GER	René Renno	6	0	6	0
	DF	(Germany) GER	Stefan Schattauer	4	0	4	0
	MF	(Germany) GER	Heinrich Schmidtgal	31	4	31	4
	DF	(Germany) GER	Lukas Schmitz	24	2	24	2
	DF	(Germany) GER	Rouven Schröder	20	0	20	0
	MF	(Germany) GER	Oliver Schröder	1	0	1	0
	MF	(Germany) GER	Kevin Vogt (since 1 January 2009)	2	0	2	0
	DF	(Algeria) ALG	Antar Yahia	1	0	1	0
	MF	(Germany) GER	David Zajas	21	0	21	0
	MF	(Canada) CAN	Gianluca Zavarise	19	1	19	1
	MF	(Germany) GER	Oliver Zech	24	0	24	0
