= Marc Rzatkowski =

German footballer (born 1990)

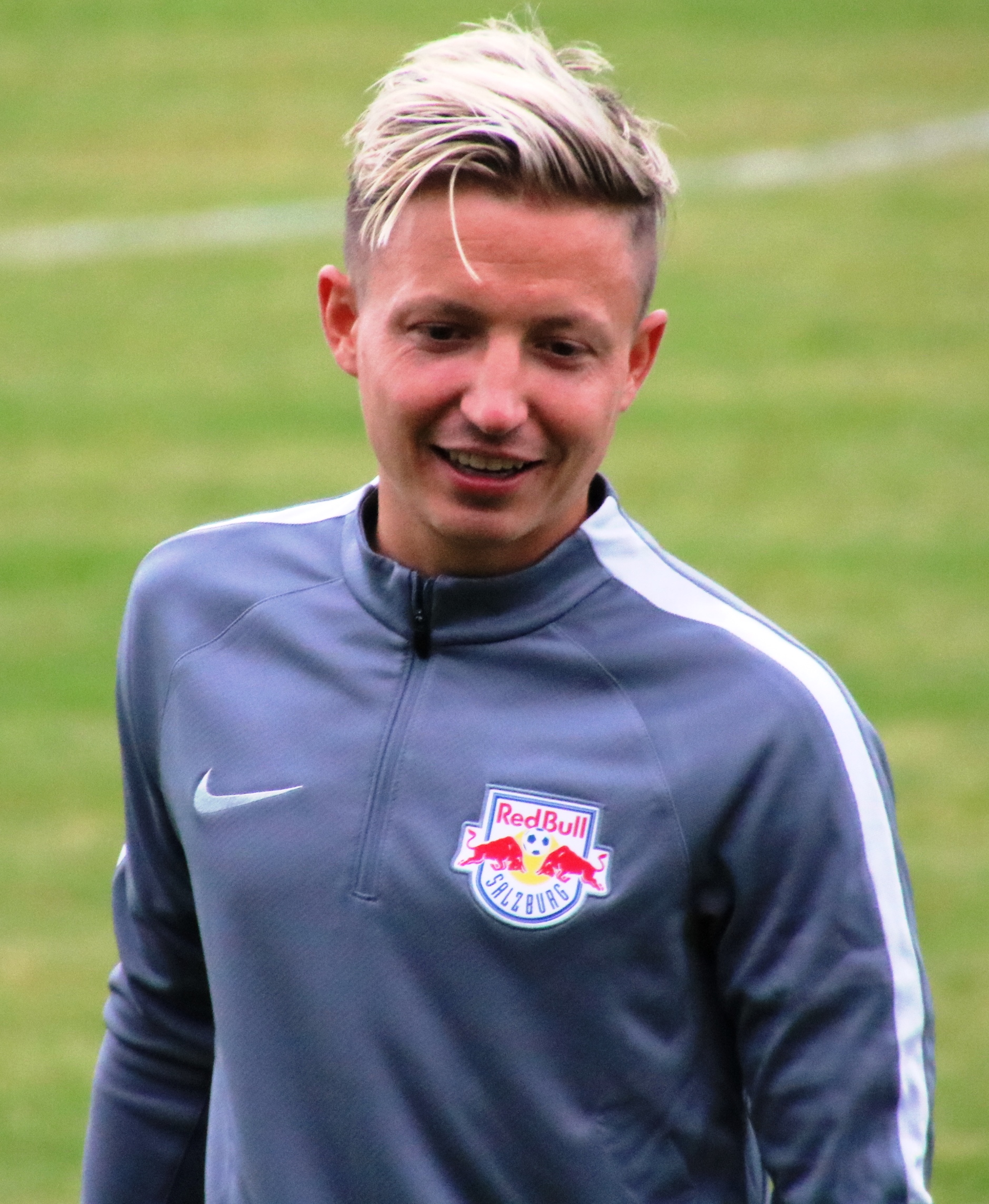
- Rzatkowski with Red Bull Salzburg in 2016

Personal information
- Date of birth: 2 March 1990 (age 36)
- Place of birth: Bochum, West Germany
- Height: 1.71 m (5 ft 7 in)
- Position: Attacking midfielder

Youth career
- 1993–1998: SV Langendreer 04
- 1998–2009: VfL Bochum

Senior career*
Years	Team	Apps	(Gls)
2009–2011	VfL Bochum II	42	(8)
2010–2013	VfL Bochum	29	(4)
2011–2012	→ Arminia Bielefeld (loan)	37	(4)
2013–2016	FC St. Pauli	85	(12)
2016–2019	Red Bull Salzburg	12	(2)
2018	→ New York Red Bulls (loan)	24	(2)
2019–2020	New York Red Bulls	44	(2)
2021–2022	Schalke 04	2	(0)
2021–2022	Schalke 04 II	6	(0)
2022–2023	Arminia Bielefeld	24	(0)
- * Club domestic league appearances and goals as of 28 May 2023

Marc Rzatkowski (born 2 March 1990) is a German professional footballer who plays as an attacking midfielder.

== Career ==
=== VfL Bochum ===
Rzatkowski was born in Bochum, West Germany. In his early youth, Rzatkowski played for the Bochum east district team SV Langendreer 04. In 1998, he started playing for the VfL Bochum youth team until 2009. Rzatkowski then signed a contract for VfL Bochum II in 2009. Only one year later he signed his first contract as a professional with the VfL Bochum. His first game as a professional player was on the seventh match day (2 October 2010) against Greuther Fürth. He came into the game as a substitute for Roman Prokoph (67th minute). In his second match he made his first appearance in the starting squad and scored the third goal (80th minute) in a 3–0 victory against SC Paderborn during the home match on 26 November 2010. He also played against Union Berlin and VfL Osnabrück in his first season with the first team.

=== Loan to Arminia Bielefeld ===
For the 2011–12 season Rzatkowski was sent on loan to Arminia Bielefeld. On 27 August 2011 Rzatkowski scored his first goal for Arminia Bielefeld in a 2–2 draw with SSV Jahn Regensburg. On 15 October he scored the loan goal for Bielefeld in a 1–0 victory over Kickers Offenbach. In his one year at the club Rzatkowski made 37 league appearances scoring 4 goals and providing 8 assists. He also helped the club capture the Westphalia Cup, scoring 4 goals in five matches during the competition. By reaching the final, they also qualified for the 2012–13 DFB-Pokal.

=== Return to Bochum ===
After a successful season with Bielefeld, Rzatkowski returned to Bochum. He scored his first goal back with the club on 30 October 2012 in a 3–1 victory over TSV Havelse in a DFB Pokal match. On 18 November 2012, Rzatkowski scored his first two league goals of the season for Bochum in a 5–2 victory over SV Sandhausen. He ended his season appearing in 25 league matches scoring 3 goals and providing 11 assists.

=== St. Pauli ===
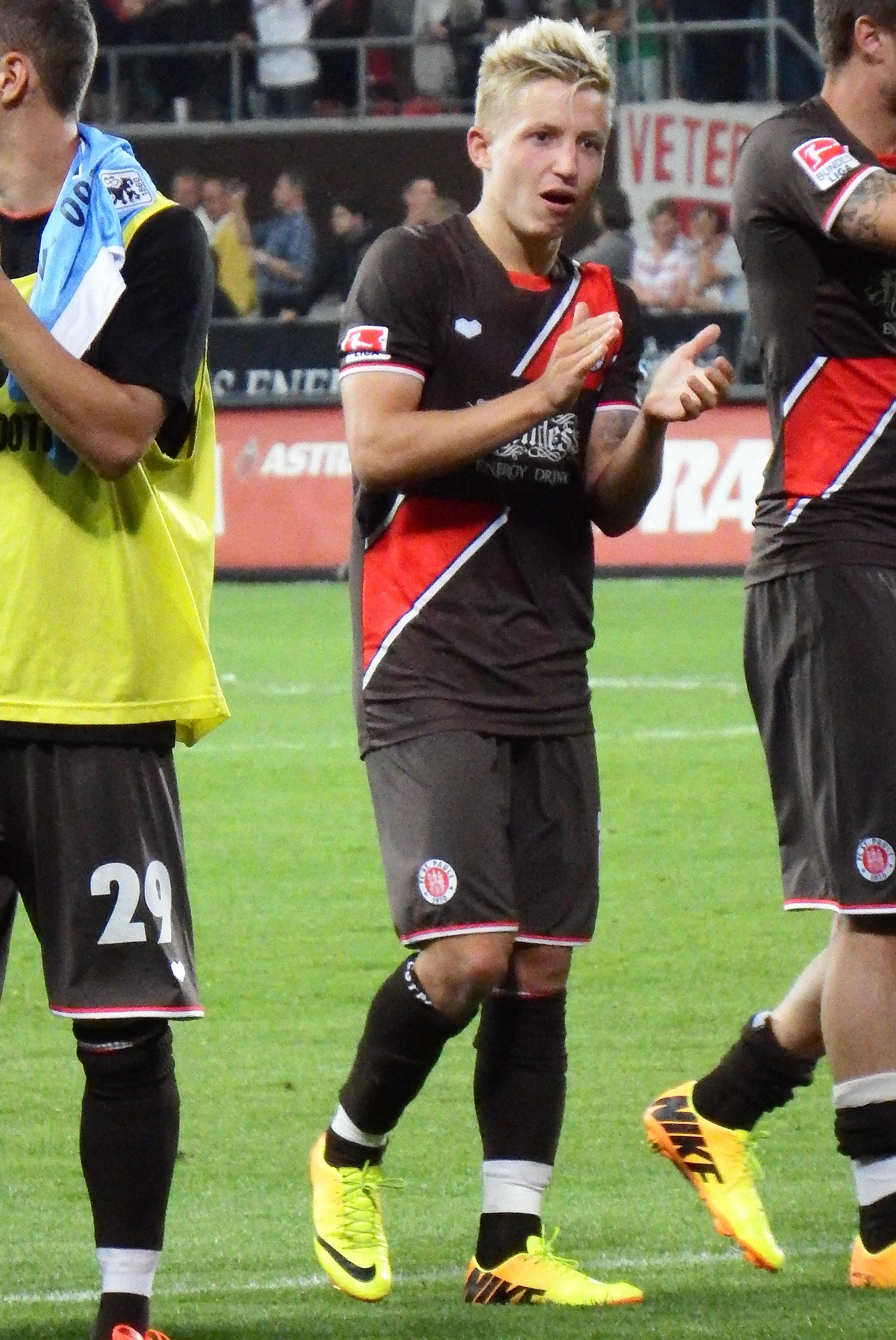
Rzatkowski with St. Pauli

Rzatkowski signed a three-year contract with FC St. Pauli in January 2013. He joined the club in the summer transfer window, becoming a key player for the team. On 13 September 2014, Rzatkowski scored his first goal for St. Pauli, the eventual game winner, in a 2–1 victory over FSV Frankfurt. On 5 April 2014, Rzatkowski scored a late winner in a 3–2 victory over SV Sandhausen.

On 12 February 2016, Rzatkowski scored the lone goal for St. Pauli in a 1–0 victory over RB Leipzig. The following match day, 19 February, he also scored in a 3–1 loss to FSV Frankfurt. He went on to score in a third consecutive league match on 28 February in a 2–0 victory over MSV Duisburg. At the conclusion of the 2015–16 season Rzatkowski was honored by Kicker as the best defensive midfielder in 2. Bundesliga.

=== RB Salzburg ===
On 10 June 2016, Rzatkowski joined Austrian Bundesliga club, FC Red Bull Salzburg on a four-year deal. On 21 September 2016, Rzatkowski scored his first goal for Salzburg in a 7–1 victory over SC Mannsdorf in the ÖFB-Cup. On 23 October 2016, he scored his first goal in the Austrian Bundesliga in a 5–1 victory over SKN St. Pölten. On 19 July 2017, Rzatkowski opened the scoring for Salzburg in a 3–0 victory over Hibernians F.C. in the second qualifying round of the UEFA Champions League.

=== New York Red Bulls ===
On 31 January 2018, it was announced that Rzatkowski was joining the New York Red Bulls on loan for the 2018 season.

On 22 February 2018, Rzatkowski made his debut for New York, coming on in the second half in a 1–1 draw against CD Olimpia in the first leg of the round of 16 match of the CONCACAF Champions League. On 13 March 2018, Rzatkowski scored the eventual game winning goal for New York in a 3–1 victory over Club Tijuana in the CONCACAF Champions League, helping the club advance to semifinals of the Champions League for the first time. On 14 July 2018, Rzatkowski scored his first two MLS goals in a 3–2 win over Sporting Kansas City.

On 24 January 2019, Rzatkowski joined New York on a permanent basis.

Rzatkowski was released by New York following their 2020 season.

=== Schalke 04 ===
On 21 September 2021, Rzatkowski signed for Schalke 04 on a season-long contract.

=== Return to Arminia Bielefeld ===
In July 2022, following a trial, he returned to former club Arminia Bielefeld, newly relegated to the 2. Bundesliga. He signed a one-year contract.

== Career statistics ==
As of 6 July 2022

Appearances and goals by club, season and competition
Club	Season	League			National Cup		Continental		Other (Note: Appearances in MLS Cup Playoffs)		Total	
Club	Season	Division	Apps	Goals	Apps	Goals	Apps	Goals	Apps	Goals	Apps	Goals
VfL Bochum II	2009–10	Regionalliga West	32	8	—		—		—		32	8
VfL Bochum II	2010–11	Regionalliga West	10	0	—		—		—		10	0
VfL Bochum II	Total		42	8	—		—		—		42	8
VfL Bochum	2010–11	2. Bundesliga	4	1	0	0	—		—		4	1
VfL Bochum	2012–13	2. Bundesliga	25	3	4	1	—		—		29	4
VfL Bochum	Total		29	4	4	1	—		—		33	5
Arminia Bielefeld (loan)	2011–12	3. Liga	37	4	1	0	—		—		38	4
FC St. Pauli	2013–14	2. Bundesliga	32	2	1	0	—		—		33	2
FC St. Pauli	2014–15	2. Bundesliga	25	3	2	0	—		—		27	3
FC St. Pauli	2015–16	2. Bundesliga	28	7	1	1	—		—		29	8
FC St. Pauli	Total		85	12	4	1	—		—		89	13
Red Bull Salburg	2016–17	Austrian Bundesliga	7	1	2	1	4	0	—		13	2
Red Bull Salburg	2017–18	Austrian Bundesliga	5	1	2	1	7	1	—		14	3
Red Bull Salburg	Total		12	2	4	2	11	1	—		27	5
New York Red Bulls	2018	Major League Soccer	24	2	2	0	4	1	3	0	33	3
New York Red Bulls	2019	Major League Soccer	28	2	1	0	3	0	1	0	33	2
New York Red Bulls	2020	Major League Soccer	16	0	—		—		1	0	17	0
New York Red Bulls	Total		68	4	3	0	7	0	5	0	83	5
Schalke 04 II	2021–22	Regionalliga West	6	0	—		—		—		6	0
Schalke 04	2021–22	2. Bundesliga	2	0	0	0	—		—		2	0
Arminia Bielefeld	2022–23	2. Bundesliga	0	0	0	0	—		—		0	0
Career total			281	34	16	4	18	2	5	0	320	40

== Honours ==
Red Bull Salzburg

- Austrian Bundesliga: 2016–17
- Austrian Cup: 2016–17

New York Red Bulls

- MLS Supporters' Shield: 2018

Schalke 04

- 2. Bundesliga: 2021–22
