= Duah =

Duah may refer to:

- Dua
- Duah (surname)
