= Matias Concha =

Swedish footballer (born 1980)

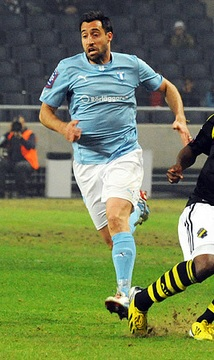
- Concha playing for Malmö FF in 2013

Personal information
- Full name: Hernán Matias Arsenio Concha
- Date of birth: 31 March 1980 (age 46)
- Place of birth: Malmö, Sweden
- Height: 1.80 m (5 ft 11 in)
- Position: Right-back

Youth career
- 1987–1996: Kulladals FF
- 1997–2000: Malmö FF

Senior career*
Years	Team	Apps	(Gls)
2000–2003	Malmö FF	58	(0)
2004–2007	Djurgårdens IF	76	(2)
2007–2012	VfL Bochum	65	(0)
2009–2012	→ VfL Bochum II	2	(0)
2012–2014	Malmö FF	17	(0)
Total		218	(2)

International career
2006–2008	Sweden	8	(0)
- * Club domestic league appearances and goals

Hernán Matias Arsenio Concha (born 31 March 1980) is a Swedish former professional footballer who played as a right-back. He started off his career with Malmö FF in 2000 and then represented Djurgårdens IF and VfL Bochum before returning to Malmö FF in 2012. A full international between 2006 and 2008, he won eight caps for the Sweden national team.

== Club career ==
=== Sweden ===
Concha was born in Malmö, where he began his career at the minor side Kulladals FF, before eventually signing for his home town giants, Malmö FF. In 2004, he moved to Stockholm and Djurgårdens IF after having been given playing time sparsely at Malmö FF. He quickly established himself as a starter for Djurgården and was part of their championship winning team of 2005, as well as Swedish cup golds 2004 and 2005. He played 76 games and scored two goals.

=== VfL Bochum ===
On 20 June 2007, it was announced that Concha would join the German football club VfL Bochum for the 2007–08 season. He signed a four-year deal with a team that had finished eighth the previous season. Concha left Bochum after the 2011–12 season.

=== Malmö FF ===
On 30 July 2012, Malmö FF announced that they had signed Concha for two and a half years. He returned to play with the number 23 shirt, symbolizing his age when he left Malmö for the first time. Concha played his first match for the club on 16 August 2012 when he played 64 minutes in a friendly against Italian side Lazio. He played two league matches for Malmö FF for the 2012 season. Concha took over the number 2 shirt for the 2013 season. He was given a lot of field time in the beginning of what turned out to be a title winning season for the club, however when Miiko Albornoz returned from suspension, Concha lost his place in the starting eleven for the rest of the season. He played a total of seven league matches for the club during the 2013 season. Concha received limited playing time also in the 2014 season, although he played eight matches in the league three matches in the clubs campaign for the 2014–15 UEFA Champions League. Concha announced his decision to retire from professional football after the 2014 season on 30 October 2014.

== International career ==
Concha made his first appearance for the Sweden men's national football team on 23 January 2006 against Jordan. He made two appearances for Sweden during the UEFA Euro 2008 qualifying campaign but did not make the squad for the final tournament.

He won his eighth and final cap on 6 February 2008 in a friendly game against Turkey.

== Career statistics ==
=== Club ===
Appearances and goals by club, season and competition
Club	Season	League			National cup (Note: Includes Svenska Cupen, DFB-Pokal)		Europe		Total	
Club	Season	Division	Apps	Goals	Apps	Goals	Apps	Goals	Apps	Goals
Malmö FF	2000	Superettan	19	0			—		19	0
Malmö FF	2001	Allsvenskan	6	0			—		6	0
Malmö FF	2002	Allsvenskan	15	0			—		15	0
Malmö FF	2003	Allsvenskan	18	0			4 (Note: Appearances in UEFA Cup)	0	22	0
Malmö FF	Total		58	0			4	0	62	0
Djurgårdens IF	2004	Allsvenskan	22	0	6	0	5 (Note: Four appearances in UEFA Champions League, one appearance in UEFA Cup)	0	33	0
Djurgårdens IF	2005	Allsvenskan	23	0	5	0	2	0	30	0
Djurgårdens IF	2006	Allsvenskan	20	2	0	0	1 (Note: Appearances in UEFA Champions League)	0	21	2
Djurgårdens IF	2007	Allsvenskan	11	0	0	0	—		11	0
Djurgårdens IF	Total		76	2	11	0	8	0	95	2
VfL Bochum	2007–08	Bundesliga	18	0	2	0	—		20	0
VfL Bochum	2008–09	Bundesliga	15	0	0	0	—		15	0
VfL Bochum	2009–10	Bundesliga	21	0	0	0	—		21	0
VfL Bochum	2010–11	2. Bundesliga	10	0	0	0	—		10	0
VfL Bochum	2011–12	2. Bundesliga	1	0	0	0	—		1	0
VfL Bochum	Total		65	0	2	0	—		67	0
VfL Bochum II	2009–10	Regionalliga	1	0	—		—		1	0
VfL Bochum II	2011–12	Regionalliga	1	0	—		—		1	0
VfL Bochum II	Total		2	0	—		—		2	0
Malmö FF	2012	Allsvenskan	2	0	1	0	—		3	0
Malmö FF	2013	Allsvenskan	7	0	4	0	0	0	11	0
Malmö FF	2014	Allsvenskan	8	0	2	0	3	0	13	0
Malmö FF	Total		17	0	7	0	3	0	27	0
Career total			218	2	20	0	15	0	253	2

=== International ===
Appearances and goals by national team and year
National team	Year	Apps	Goals
Sweden	2006	1	0
Sweden	2007	6	0
Sweden	2008	1	0
Total		8	0

== Honours ==
Djurgårdens IF

- Allsvenskan: 2005
- Svenska Cupen: 2004, 2005

Malmö FF

- Allsvenskan: 2013, 2014
- Svenska Supercupen: 2013
