= 2012–13 FC Erzgebirge Aue season =

Erzgebirge Aue
2012–13 season
- Stadium: Erzgebirgsstadion, Aue, Germany
- 2.Bundesliga: 16th
- DFB-Pokal: Second round
Home colours	Away colours

The 2012–13 Erzgebirge Aue season was the 67th season in the club's history. The club competed in the 2. Bundesliga, the second tier of German football. It is the clubs third consecutive season in this league, having played at this level since 2010–11, following promotion from the 3. Liga in 2010.

The club also took part in the 2012–13 edition of the DFB-Pokal, where they reached the second round, losing 2–0 to Bundesliga side 1. FSV Mainz 05 next.

== Friendly matches ==
Win Draw Loss Postponed

Friendly match details
Date	Time	Opponent	Venue	Result F–A	Scorers	Ref.
6 July 2012	17:30	Hallescher FC	Away (Note: Played at Stadion der Freundschaft)	1–3	Halil Savran	
18 July 2012	17:00	Viktoria Köln	Home (Note: Played at Städtisches Stadion im Heinepark)	1–3	Unknown	
21 July 2012	13:00	Carl Zeiss Jena	Away	5–0	Halil Savran (3), Jan Hochscheidt, Vlad Munteanu	
24 July 2012	17:00	Brentford	Home (Note: Played at Stadion am Wasserturm)	1–1	Savran 24'	

== Competitions ==
=== 2. Bundesliga ===
==== League table ====
Pos	Team	Pld	W	D	L	GF	GA	GD	Pts	Promotion, qualification or relegation
13	FC Ingolstadt	34	10	12	12	36	43	−7	42	
14	VfL Bochum	34	10	8	16	40	52	−12	38	
15	Erzgebirge Aue	34	9	10	15	39	46	−7	37	
16	Dynamo Dresden (O)	34	9	10	15	35	49	−14	37	Qualification for relegation play-offs
17	SV Sandhausen (Note: MSV Duisburg were denied a license for the 2013–14 2. Bundesliga season, and, in accordance with the rules of the DFL (Deutsche Fußball Liga), Duisburg are replaced by the best-placed originally relegated team, SV Sandhausen.)	34	6	8	20	38	66	−28	26	

Source: kicker.de
Rules for classification: 1) points; 2) goal difference; 3) number of goals scored.
(O) Play-off winners

==== Matches ====
2. Bundesliga match details
Match	Date	Time	Opponent	Venue	Result F–A	Scorers	Attendance	Referee	Ref.
1	3 August 2012	18:00	St. Pauli	Home	0–0		12,200	Weiner	
2	10 August 2012	20:30	Energie Cottbus	Away	0–3		12,300	Kircher	
3	27 August 2012	20:15	1. FC Köln	Home	2–0	Müller 8', Savran 55'	10,050	Perl	
4	2 September 2012	13:30	FSV Frankfurt	Away	0–1		4,012	Stegemann	
5	16 September 2012	13:30	SC Paderborn	Home	0–1		8,000	Petersen	
6	21 September 2012	18:00	VfR Aalen	Away	0–2		5,723	Wingenbach	
7	26 September 2012	17:30	1. FC Union Berlin	Home	1–1	Schönheim 83' o.g.	7,500	Steinhaus	
8	30 September 2012	13:30	Dynamo Dresden	Away	1–3	Sylvestr 83'	29,200	Bandurski	
9	7 October 2012	13:30	Jahn Regensburg	Home	3–1	Hochscheidt 34', Sylvestr 58', König 89'	7,400	Christ	
10	22 October 2012	20:15	1860 Munich	Away	1–1	Sylvestr 51'	17,600	Stieler	
11	27 October 2012	13:00	VfL Bochum	Home	6–1	Müller 7', König 9', 49', Hochscheidt 10', 46', Paulus 59' pen.	6,500	Grudzinski	
12	5 November 2012	20:15	1. FC Kaiserslautern	Away	1–4	Hochscheidt 23'	23,372	Hartmann	
13	9 November 2012	18:00	Eintracht Braunschweig	Home	1–1	Schröder 69'	7,600	Aytekin	
14	18 November 2012	13:30	MSV Duisburg	Away	1–2	Hochscheidt 42'	10,136	Willenborg	
15	25 November 2012	13:30	Hertha BSC	Home	0–4		11,150	Weiner	
16	28 November 2012	17:30	FC Ingolstadt 04	Away	2–1	Hensel 20', Hochscheidt 60'	4,305	Siebert	
17	1 December 2012	13:00	SV Sandhausen	Home	2–2	Hochscheidt 8', Paulus 80' pen.	6,150	Cortus	
18	9 December 2012	13:30	St. Pauli	Away	3–0	Hochscheidt 49', Sylvestr 76', Wiegel 89'	20,740	Sippel	
19	14 December 2012	18:00	Energie Cottbus	Home	3–0	Sylvestr 38', 80', Fink 85'	7,050	Fritz	
20	2 February 2013	13:00	1. FC Köln	Away	2–1	Pezzoni 79'	41,800	Stieler	
21	8 February 2013	18:00	FSV Frankfurt	Home	0–2		6,500	Cortus	
22	15 February 2013	18:00	SC Paderborn	Away	0–2		5,617	Dietz	
23	22 February 2013	18:00	VfR Aalen	Home	1–1	Hensel 10'	5,500	Stegemann	
24	1 March 2013	18:00	1. FC Union Berlin	Away	0–3		17,284	Petersen	
25	10 March 2013	13:30	Dynamo Dresden	Home	1–0	Hochscheidt 29'	14,200	Aytekin	
26	17 March 2013	13:30	Jahn Regensburg	Away	1–1	Schlitte 12'	6,771	Willenborg	
27	28 March 2013	18:00	1860 Munich	Home	0–1		9,300	Meyer	
28	5 April 2013	18:00	VfL Bochum	Away	3–0	Klingbeil 8', Nickenig 29', Müller 37'	13,133	Hartmann	
29	15 April 2013	20:15	1. FC Kaiserslautern	Home	1–1	Schlitte 83'	8,300	Zwayer	
30	21 April 2013	13:30	Eintracht Braunschweig	Away	1–1	Schröder 80'	20,500	Dingert	
31	27 April 2013	13:00	MSV Duisburg	Home	0–0		9,000	Kampka	
32	3 May 2013	18:00	Hertha BSC	Away	2–3	Sylvestr 46', 66'	33,200	Dankert	
33	12 May 2013	13:30	FC Ingolstadt 04	Home	0–1		11,800	Stieler	
34	19 May 2013	13:30	SV Sandhausen	Away	1–0	Hochscheidt 79'	5,250	Sippel	

=== DFB-Pokal ===
DFB-Pokal match details
Round	Date	Time	Opponent	Venue	Result F–A	Scorers	Attendance	Referee	Ref.
First round	19 August 2012	16:00	Eintracht Frankfurt	Home	3–0	Paulus 21' pen., Sylvestr 61', 90'	9,575	Siebert	
Second round	30 October 2013	20:30	Mainz 05	Away	2–0	Ivanschitz 18', Mallı 47'	12,677	Dankert	
