= Duah (surname) =

Duah is a surname. Notable people with the surname include:

- Abu Duah (born 1978), Ghanaian sprinter
- Alexandra Duah (died 2000), Ghanaian actress
- Emmanuel Duah (born 1976), Ghanaian footballer
- Jürgen Duah (born 1985), German footballer
- Kwadwo Duah (born 1997), Swiss footballer
- Nana Arhin Duah (born 1980), Ghanaian footballer
- Solomon Duah (born 1993), Finnish footballer
