= Luciano Velardi =

Italian footballer

Personal information
- Date of birth: 20 August 1981 (age 45)
- Place of birth: Ronsdorf, West Germany
- Height: 1.69 m (5 ft 7 in)
- Positions: Midfielder; striker

Team information
- Current team: Cronenberger SC (manager)

Youth career
- TSV 05 Ronsdorf
- –1999: KFC Uerdingen 05
- 1999–2000: VfL Bochum

Senior career*
| Years | Team | Apps | (Gls) |
| 2000–2005 | VfL Bochum II | 152 | (65) |
| 2002–2003 | VfL Bochum | 2 | (0) |
| 2005–2007 | 1. FC Kleve | 34 | (6) |
| 2007–2008 | KFC Uerdingen 05 | 33 | (9) |
| 2008–2009 | SSVg Velbert | 31 | (3) |
| 2009–2011 | Cronenberger SC | | |
| 2011–2013 | TSV Ronsdorf | | |

Managerial career
- 2013–2014: SSV Sudberg
- 2014–2015: GW Wuppertal (U19)
- 2015–2017: GW Wuppertal
- 2017–2018: TSV Beyenburg
- 2019–2021: SV Bayer Wuppertal
- 2022: SC Sonnborn 07
- 2022: FSV Duisburg
- 2023: TV Dabringhausen
- 2024–: Cronenberger SC
- * Club domestic league appearances and goals

Luciano Velardi (born 20 August 1981) is an Italian football coach and a former player who played as a forward or midfielder. He is the manager of Cronenberger SC. He was born in Germany and spent all of his football career there. He spent one season in the Bundesliga with VfL Bochum.

| Club performance | | | League | | Cup | | Total | |
| Season | Club | League | Apps | Goals | Apps | Goals | Apps | Goals |
| Germany | | | League | | DFB-Pokal | | Total | |
|---|---|---|---|---|---|---|---|---|
| 2000–01 | VfL Bochum II | Oberliga Westfalen | 23 | 6 | — | | 23 | 6 |
| 2001–02 | VfL Bochum II | Oberliga Westfalen | 31 | 8 | — | | 31 | 8 |
| 2002–03 | VfL Bochum II | Oberliga Westfalen | 32 | 17 | — | | 32 | 17 |
| 2002–03 | VfL Bochum | Bundesliga | 2 | 0 | 0 | 0 | 2 | 0 |
| 2003–04 | VfL Bochum II | Oberliga Westfalen | 32 | 17 | — | | 32 | 17 |
| 2004–05 | VfL Bochum II | Oberliga Westfalen | 34 | 17 | — | | 34 | 17 |
| 2005–06 | 1. FC Kleve | Oberliga Nordrhein | 6 | 3 | — | | 6 | 3 |
| 2006–07 | 1. FC Kleve | Oberliga Nordrhein | 28 | 3 | — | | 28 | 3 |
| 2007–08 | KFC Uerdingen 05 | Oberliga Nordrhein | 33 | 9 | — | | 33 | 9 |
| 2008–09 | SSVg Velbert | NRW-Liga | 31 | 3 | — | | 31 | 3 |
| Total | Germany | | 252 | 83 | 0 | 0 | 252 | 83 |
| Career total | | | 252 | 83 | 0 | 0 | 252 | 83 |
