= Faton Toski =

German footballer (born 1987)

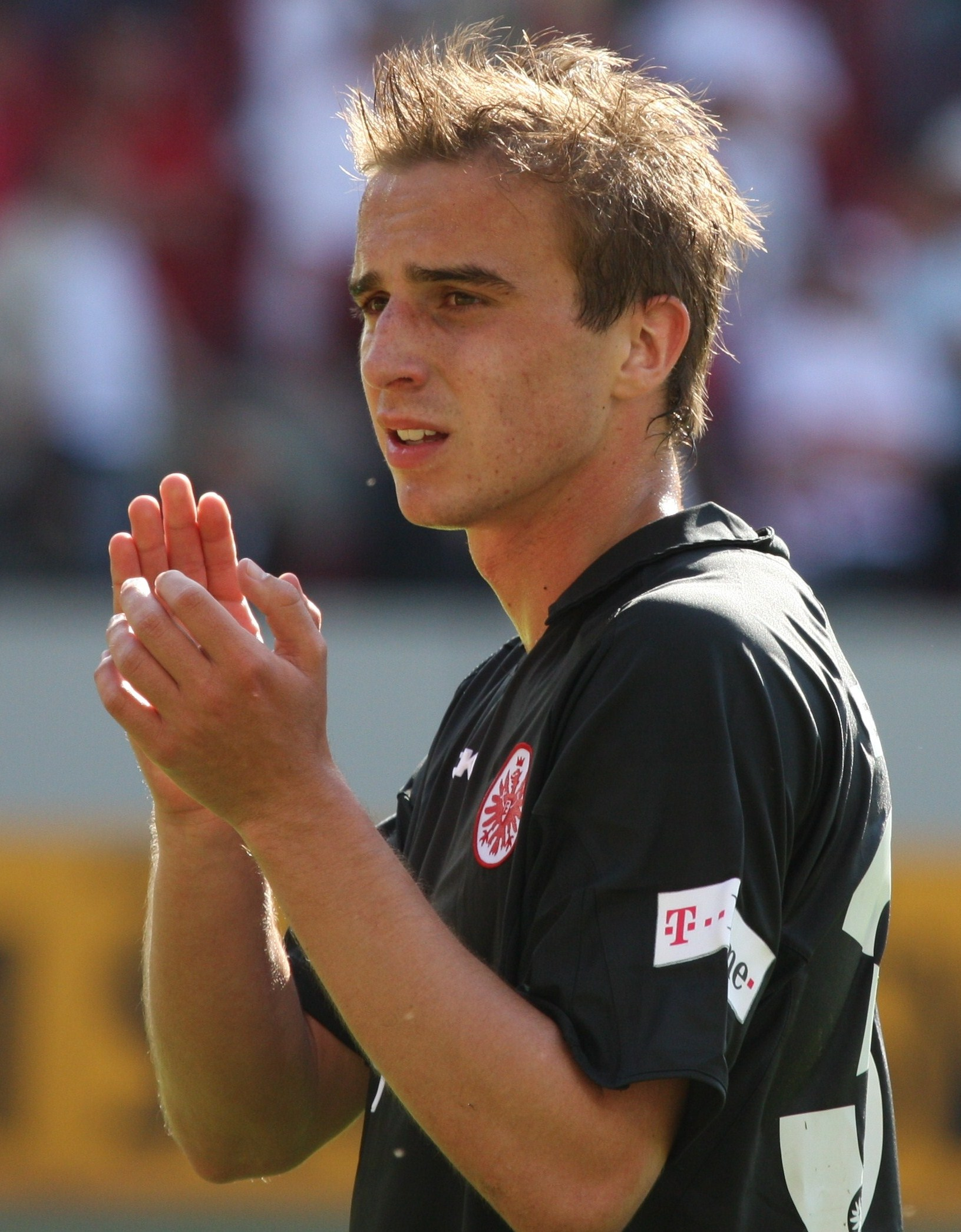
- Toski in 2008 with Eintracht Frankfurt

Personal information
- Date of birth: 17 February 1987 (age 39)
- Place of birth: Gjilan, SFR Yugoslavia, (modern day Kosovo)
- Height: 1.85 m (6 ft 1 in)
- Position: Midfielder

Youth career
- 1993–1994: TuS Makkabi Frankfurt
- 1994–2006: Eintracht Frankfurt

Senior career*
Years	Team	Apps	(Gls)
2006–2010	Eintracht Frankfurt II	41	(5)
2006–2010	Eintracht Frankfurt	27	(3)
2010–2013	VfL Bochum	41	(3)
2012	VfL Bochum II	2	(0)
2014–2015	FSV Frankfurt	17	(1)
2016	Laçi	10	(1)
2017	Perak	10	(1)
Total		148	(14)

International career
2005–2006	Germany U19	5	(1)
2014	Kosovo	3	(0)
- * Club domestic league appearances and goals

Faton Toski (born 17 February 1987) is a former professional footballer who played as a midfielder. Born in SFR Yugoslavia and raised in Germany, he played for the Germany U19 national team and the Kosovo senior national team.

== Club career ==
=== Early career ===
Toski was born in Gjilan, SFR Yugoslavia, today modern Kosovo. His family moved to Germany when he was still young. He began his career for TuS Makkabi Frankfurt and signed after one year a youth contract for Eintracht Frankfurt.

=== Eintracht Frankfurt ===
He debuted in the Bundesliga for the Eagles in a match against Werder Bremen on 12 May 2007. He scored his first goal for the club on 8 December 2007 in a 2–2 draw against Schalke 04.

=== Bochum ===
On 11 June 2010, he left Frankfurt after sixteen years and signed for VfL Bochum.

=== FSV Frankfurt ===
On 21 January 2014, Toski joined FSV Frankfurt by signing until the end of 2013–14 season, with option of renewing. He made his debut for Frankfurt on 7 February 2014 against exactly his previous team VfL Bochum, coming on as a substitute in place of Nikita Rukavytsya in the 72nd minute of the match, which Frankfurt won 2–1. During the second part of the season, Toski was used briefly, making only six appearances, only two of them as a starter.

=== Laçi ===
On 16 August 2016, Toski joined Albanian Superliga side Laçi as a free agent, signing a two-year contract. Due to his big experience, Toski was prompted team captain by coach Marcello Troisi. He made his first Laçi appearance on 7 September in the opening Albanian Superliga week against newly promoted side Korabi Peshkopi which ended in a goalless draw. On 17 October, Toski scored Laçi's first league goal of the season in the matchday 7 against Vllaznia Shkodër, after he noticed the wrong placement of goalkeeper Jasmin Agović, and taking a shot from the midfield. Until the end of the first part of the season, Toski appeared in 11 matches, including one in cup, as Laçi struggled for results. On 14 January of the following year, he left the club to purchase a career in Malaysia.

== International career ==
Toski is former member of the Germany U19 national team and earned five caps, who scored one goal. He declared in 2010 to the Albanian media that he would play for Kosovo, but if international recognition of Kosovo's national team would be problematic, he would accept playing for Albania. He played his first international friendly match for Kosovo on 5 March 2014, appearing as a substitute in a goalless draw against Haiti.

== Career statistics ==
=== Club ===
Appearances and goals by club, season and competition
Club	Season	League			Cup		Other		Total		Ref.
Club	Season	Division	Apps	Goals	Apps	Goals	Apps	Goals	Apps	Goals	Ref.
Eintracht Frankfurt II	2005–06	Oberliga Hessen	1	0	—		—		1	0	
Eintracht Frankfurt II	2006–07	Oberliga Hessen	11	3	—		—		11	3	
Eintracht Frankfurt II	2007–08	Oberliga Hessen	12	2	—		—		12	2	
Eintracht Frankfurt II	2009–10	Regionalliga Süd	17	4	—		—		17	4	
Eintracht Frankfurt II	Total		41	5	0	0	0	0	41	5	–
Eintracht Frankfurt	2006–07	Bundesliga	2	0	0	0	—		2	0	
Eintracht Frankfurt	2007–08	Bundesliga	12	2	0	0	—		13	2	
Eintracht Frankfurt	2008–09	Bundesliga	13	1	1	0	—		13	1	
Eintracht Frankfurt	2009–10	Bundesliga	0	0	0	0	—		0	0	
Eintracht Frankfurt	Total		27	3	1	0	0	0	28	3	–
VfL Bochum	2010–11	2. Bundesliga	17	0	1	0	2	0	20	0	
VfL Bochum	2011–12	2. Bundesliga	15	2	2	0	—		17	2	
VfL Bochum	2012–13	2. Bundesliga	9	1	0	0	—		9	1	
VfL Bochum	Total		41	3	3	0	2	0	46	3	–
VfL Bochum II	2012–13	Regionalliga West	2	0	—		—		2	0	
FSV Frankfurt	2013–14	2. Bundesliga	6	0	0	0	—		6	0	
FSV Frankfurt	2014–15	2. Bundesliga	11	1	0	0	—		11	1	
FSV Frankfurt	Total		17	1	0	0	0	0	17	1	–
Laçi	2016–17	Albanian Superliga	10	1	1	0	—		11	1	
Perak FA	2017	Malaysia Super League	10	1	2	2	—		12	3	
Career total			148	14	7	2	2	0	159	16	–

=== International ===
Appearances and goals by national team and year
National team	Year	Apps	Goals
Kosovo	2014	3	0
Total		3	0
