= Dilaver Güçlü =

Turkish footballer

Personal information
- Date of birth: 20 February 1986 (age 40)
- Place of birth: Velbert, West Germany
- Height: 1.72 m (5 ft 8 in)
- Position: Left winger

Youth career
- –2000: Borussia Dortmund
- 2000–2003: Wuppertaler SV Borussia
- 2004–2005: VfL Bochum

Senior career*
| Years | Team | Apps | (Gls) |
| 2005–2009 | VfL Bochum II | 111 | (25) |
| 2009–2010 | Manisaspor | 6 | (0) |
| 2011–2012 | Samsunspor | 4 | (0) |
| 2012 | Denizlispor | 16 | (7) |
| 2012–2013 | Göztepe | 26 | (2) |
| 2013–2015 | Osmanlıspor | 49 | (9) |
| 2015–2016 | Balıkesirspor | 21 | (3) |
| 2017 | Giresunspor | 20 | (1) |
| 2017–2018 | Gümüşhanespor | 31 | (9) |
| 2018–2019 | Sakaryaspor | 31 | (12) |
| 2019–2020 | Manisa | 21 | (9) |
| 2020–2022 | Kocaelispor | 29 | (4) |
| 2022 | Şanlıurfaspor | 13 | (4) |
| 2022–2023 | Nevşehir Belediyespor | 27 | (10) |
| 2023 | Kuşadasıspor | 11 | (0) |
- * Club domestic league appearances and goals

Dilaver Güçlü (born 20 February 1986) is a German former footballer who most recently played as a left winger.

== Career statistics ==
As of 27 September 2022

Appearances and goals by club, season and competition
| Club | Season | League | | | National cup (Note: Includes DFB-Pokal, Turkish Cup.) | | Total | |
| Club | Season | Division | Apps | Goals | Apps | Goals | Apps | Goals |
|---|---|---|---|---|---|---|---|---|
| VfL Bochum II | 2005–06 | Oberliga Westfalen | 30 | 8 | 1 | 0 | 31 | 8 |
| VfL Bochum II | 2006–07 | Oberliga Westfalen | 24 | 7 | — | | 24 | 7 |
| VfL Bochum II | 2007–08 | Oberliga Westfalen | 32 | 6 | — | | 32 | 7 |
| VfL Bochum II | 2008–09 | Regionalliga West | 25 | 5 | — | | 25 | 5 |
| VfL Bochum II | Total | | 111 | 26 | 1 | 0 | 112 | 26 |
| VfL Bochum | 2008–09 | Bundesliga | 0 | 0 | 0 | 0 | 0 | 0 |
| Manisaspor | 2009–10 | Süper Lig | 6 | 0 | 7 | 0 | 13 | 0 |
| Samsunspor | 2010–11 | TFF First League | 4 | 0 | 0 | 0 | 4 | 0 |
| Denizlispor | 2010–11 | TFF First League | 16 | 7 | 0 | 0 | 16 | 7 |
| Göztepe | 2012–13 | TFF First League | 26 | 2 | 3 | 0 | 29 | 0 |
| Osmanlıspor | 2013–14 | TFF First League | 34 | 8 | 0 | 0 | 34 | 8 |
| Osmanlıspor | 2014–15 | Süper Lig | 15 | 1 | 1 | 0 | 16 | 1 |
| Osmanlıspor | Total | | 49 | 9 | 1 | 0 | 50 | 9 |
| Balıkesirspor | 2015–16 | TFF First League | 21 | 3 | 0 | 0 | 21 | 3 |
| Giresunspor | 2017 | TFF First League | 20 | 1 | 0 | 0 | 20 | 1 |
| Gümüşhanespor | 2017–18 | TFF Second League | 31 | 9 | 1 | 0 | 32 | 9 |
| Sakaryaspor | 2018–19 | TFF Second League | 31 | 12 | 1 | 0 | 32 | 12 |
| Manisa | 2019–20 | TFF Second League | 21 | 9 | 1 | 1 | 22 | 10 |
| Kocaelispor | 2020–21 | TFF Second League | 23 | 4 | 0 | 0 | 23 | 4 |
| Kocaelispor | 2021–22 | TFF First League | 6 | 0 | 3 | 1 | 9 | 1 |
| Kocaelispor | Total | | 29 | 4 | 3 | 1 | 32 | 5 |
| Şanlıurfaspor | 2021-22 | TFF Second League | 11 | 4 | 0 | 0 | 11 | 4 |
| Şanlıurfaspor | 2022-23 | TFF Second League | 2 | 0 | 1 | 0 | 3 | 0 |
| Şanlıurfaspor | Total | | 13 | 4 | 1 | 0 | 15 | 4 |
| Nevşehir Belediyespor | 2022–23 | TFF Third League | 2 | 0 | 0 | 0 | 2 | 0 |
| Career total | | | 380 | 86 | 19 | 2 | 399 | 88 |
