= Giovanni Federico =

German–born Italian footballer

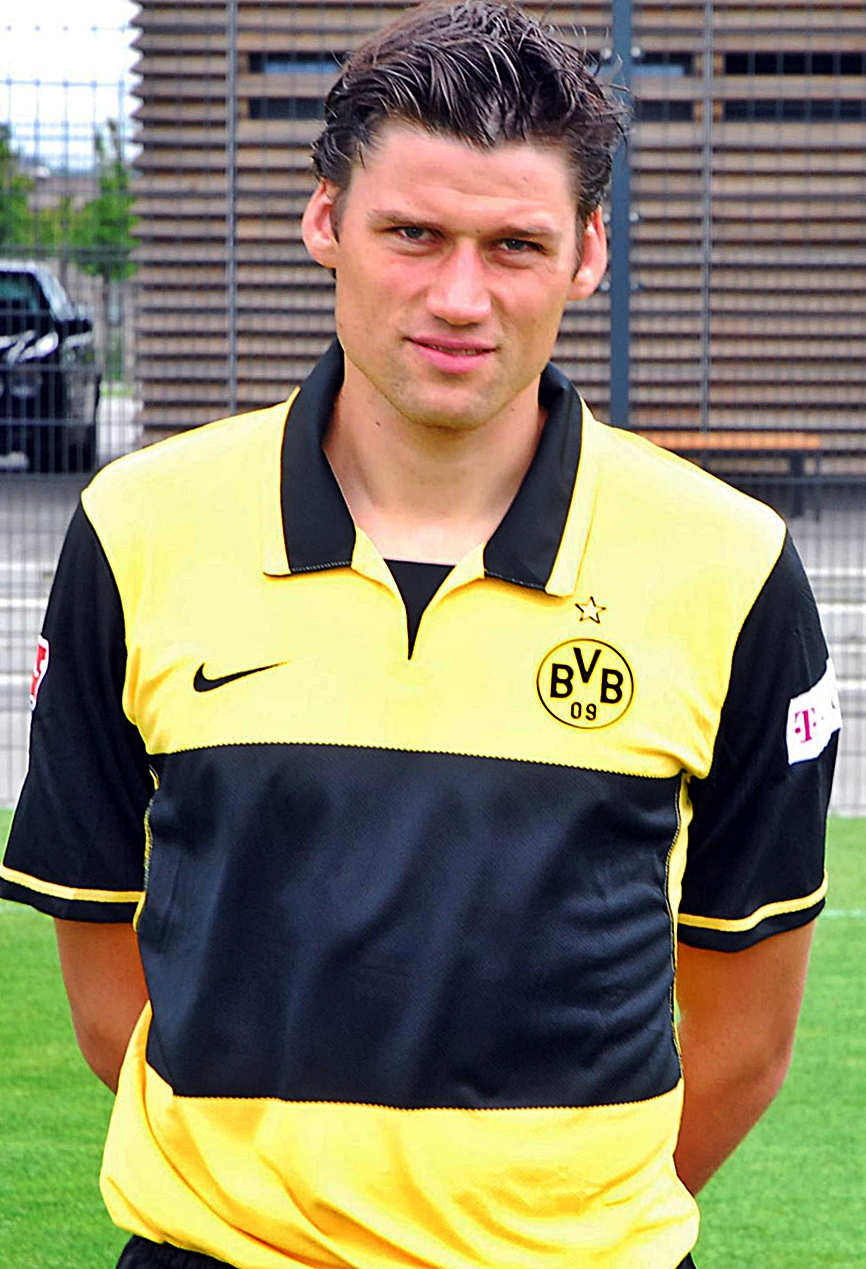
- Federico in 2007

Personal information
- Date of birth: 4 October 1980 (age 46)
- Place of birth: Hagen, West Germany
- Height: 1.83 m (6 ft 0 in)
- Position: Attacking midfielder

Youth career
- 1985–1994: SSV Hagen
- 1994–1999: VfL Bochum

Senior career*
| Years | Team | Apps | (Gls) |
| 1999–2000 | VfL Bochum II | 31 | (7) |
| 2000–2005 | 1. FC Köln II | 131 | (79) |
| 2002–2005 | 1. FC Köln | 18 | (0) |
| 2005–2007 | Karlsruher SC | 64 | (33) |
| 2007–2009 | Borussia Dortmund | 32 | (4) |
| 2008 | → Borussia Dortmund II | 2 | (0) |
| 2009 | → Karlsruher SC (loan) | 15 | (2) |
| 2009–2010 | Arminia Bielefeld | 33 | (12) |
| 2010–2012 | VfL Bochum | 57 | (11) |
| 2012–2013 | Viktoria Köln | 15 | (2) |
| 2014–2016 | TuS Ennepetal | 59 | (8) |
| 2016–2018 | SSV Hagen | 24 | (10) |

Managerial career
- 2016–2018: SSV Hagen (player-manager)
- * Club domestic league appearances and goals

Giovanni Federico (born 4 October 1980) is a German former professional footballer who played as an attacking midfielder.

== Playing career ==
Federico was born in Hagen, North Rhine-Westphalia. He agreed to join Borussia Dortmund from Karlsruher SC for 2007–08 on a Bosman transfer on 7 March 2007, after a highly successful season, individually (top goalscorer with 19 goals) and collectively (his team achieved promotion with the first place in 2. Bundesliga). He returned to Karlsruhe on loan in the 2008–09 winter transfer window on loan. After Karlsruhe were relegated at the end of the 2008–09 season, Federico originally returned to Borussia Dortmund, but was signed by Arminia Bielefeld on 10 July. After one year with Arminia Bielefeld, he announced his return to VfL Bochum and signed on 10 June 2010. When Federico ended his professional career in Bochum in 2012, he had amassed 62 goals at the top two levels of the German football pyramid.

== Managerial career ==
In October 2016, Federico returned to his former childhood club, SSV Hagen, where he was appointed player-manager. He left the club at his own request in February 2018 because would like to devote himself to other tasks in the future.

== Career statistics ==
Appearances and goals by club, season and competition
| Club | Season | League | | | Cup | | Total | |
| Club | Season | Division | Apps | Goals | Apps | Goals | Apps | Goals |
|---|---|---|---|---|---|---|---|---|
| VfL Bochum II | 1999–00 | Regionalliga West/Südwest | 31 | 7 | — | | 31 | 7 |
| 1. FC Köln II | 2000–01 | Oberliga Nordrhein | 34 | 22 | — | | 34 | 22 |
| 1. FC Köln II | 2001–02 | Oberliga Nordrhein | 29 | 19 | — | | 29 | 19 |
| 1. FC Köln II | 2002–03 | Regionalliga Nord | 24 | 12 | — | | 24 | 12 |
| 1. FC Köln II | 2003–04 | Regionalliga Nord | 10 | 6 | — | | 10 | 6 |
| 1. FC Köln II | 2004–05 | Regionalliga Nord | 34 | 20 | 2 | 1 | 36 | 21 |
| 1. FC Köln II | Total | | 131 | 79 | 2 | 1 | 133 | 80 |
| 1. FC Köln | 2002–03 | 2. Bundesliga | 6 | 0 | 2 | 0 | 8 | 0 |
| 1. FC Köln | 2003–04 | Bundesliga | 12 | 0 | 2 | 1 | 14 | 1 |
| 1. FC Köln | 2004–05 | 2. Bundesliga | 0 | 0 | 0 | 0 | 0 | 0 |
| 1. FC Köln | Total | | 18 | 0 | 4 | 1 | 22 | 1 |
| Karlsruher SC | 2005–06 | 2. Bundesliga | 30 | 14 | 2 | 0 | 32 | 14 |
| Karlsruher SC | 2006–07 | 2. Bundesliga | 34 | 19 | 2 | 0 | 36 | 19 |
| Karlsruher SC | Total | | 64 | 33 | 4 | 0 | 68 | 33 |
| Borussia Dortmund | 2007–08 | Bundesliga | 30 | 4 | 3 | 2 | 33 | 6 |
| Borussia Dortmund | 2008–09 | Bundesliga | 2 | 0 | 1 | 0 | 3 | 0 |
| Borussia Dortmund | Total | | 32 | 4 | 4 | 2 | 36 | 6 |
| Borussia Dortmund II | 2007–08 | Regionalliga West | 1 | 0 | — | | 1 | 0 |
| Borussia Dortmund II | 2008–09 | Regionalliga West | 1 | 0 | — | | 1 | 0 |
| Borussia Dortmund II | Total | | 2 | 0 | 0 | 0 | 2 | 0 |
| Karlsruher SC (loan) | 2008–09 | Bundesliga | 15 | 2 | 0 | 0 | 15 | 2 |
| Arminia Bielefeld | 2009–10 | 2. Bundesliga | 33 | 12 | 2 | 1 | 35 | 13 |
| VfL Bochum | 2010–11 | 2. Bundesliga | 29 | 7 | 1 | 0 | 30 | 7 |
| VfL Bochum | 2011–12 | 2. Bundesliga | 28 | 4 | 3 | 2 | 31 | 6 |
| VfL Bochum | Total | | 57 | 11 | 4 | 2 | 61 | 13 |
| Viktoria Köln | 2012–13 | Regionalliga West | 15 | 2 | 0 | 0 | 15 | 2 |
| Career total | | | 398 | 150 | 20 | 7 | 418 | 157 |
