= Oliver Schröder =

German footballer

Personal information
- Full name: Oliver Schröder
- Date of birth: 11 June 1980 (age 46)
- Place of birth: West Berlin, West Germany
- Height: 1.83 m (6 ft 0 in)
- Position: Defender

Team information
- Current team: Hertha BSC (youth)

Youth career
- SC Tegel
- –1996: Reinickendorfer Füchse
- 1996–1998: Spandauer BC
- 1998–2001: Hertha BSC

Senior career*
Years	Team	Apps	(Gls)
1999–2002	Hertha BSC II	73	(5)
2002–2003	1. FC Köln II	18	(2)
2002–2004	1. FC Köln	44	(1)
2004–2006	Hertha BSC	31	(1)
2004–2005	Hertha BSC II	7	(0)
2006–2009	VfL Bochum	56	(1)
2009–2010	Hansa Rostock	25	(1)
2010–2015	Erzgebirge Aue	113	(3)
2015–2017	Fortuna Köln	38	(0)

Managerial career
- 2017–: Hertha BSC (youth)
- * Club domestic league appearances and goals as of 6 August 2017

Oliver Schröder (born 11 June 1980 in West Berlin, West Germany) is a retired German footballer, currently serving as assistant coach for the under-16 team of Hertha BSC.

== Career statistics ==
Appearances and goals by club, season and competition
Club	Season	League			Cup^{1}		Continental^{2}		Other^{3}		Total	
Club	Season	Division	Apps	Goals	Apps	Goals	Apps	Goals	Apps	Goals	Apps	Goals
1. FC Köln	2002–03	2. Bundesliga	16	0	3	0	—				19	0
1. FC Köln	2003–04	Bundesliga	28	1	3	0	—				31	1
1. FC Köln	Total		44	1	6	0	—				50	1
Hertha BSC	2004–05	Bundesliga	13	0	2	0	—				15	0
Hertha BSC	2005–06	Bundesliga	18	1	1	0	2	0	1	0	22	1
Hertha BSC	Total		31	1	3	0	2	0	1	0	37	1
VfL Bochum	2006–07	Bundesliga	28	1	3	0	—				31	1
VfL Bochum	2007–08	Bundesliga	15	0	1	0	—				16	0
VfL Bochum	2008–09	Bundesliga	13	0	0	0	—				13	0
VfL Bochum	Total		56	1	4	0	—				60	1
Hansa Rostock	2009–10	2. Bundesliga	25	1	1	0	—				26	1
Erzgebirge Aue	2010–11	2. Bundesliga	18	1	1	0	—				19	1
Erzgebirge Aue	2011–12	2. Bundesliga	27	0	1	0	—				28	1
Erzgebirge Aue	2012–13	2. Bundesliga	26	2	1	0	—				27	2
Erzgebirge Aue	2013–14	2. Bundesliga	24	0	1	0	—				25	0
Erzgebirge Aue	2014–15	2. Bundesliga	18	0	2	0	—				20	0
Erzgebirge Aue	Total		113	3	6	0	—				119	3
Fortuna Köln	2015–16	3. Liga	23	0	—						23	0
Fortuna Köln	2016–17	3. Liga	15	0	—						15	0
Fortuna Köln	Total		38	0	—						38	0
Career total			307	6	20	0	2	0	1	0	330	6

- 1.Includes German Cup.
- 2.Includes UEFA Cup.
- 3.Includes German League Cup.
