= Mimoun Azaouagh =

Moroccan-born German footballer

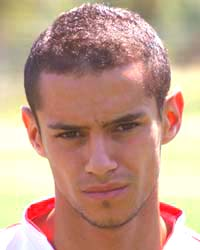
- Azaouagh in 2006

Personal information
- Date of birth: 17 November 1982 (age 43)
- Place of birth: Beni Sidel, Morocco
- Height: 1.75 m (5 ft 9 in)
- Position: Midfielder

Youth career
- 1988–1996: FSV Frankfurt
- 1996–1999: Eintracht Frankfurt
- 1999–2001: Mainz 05

Senior career*
Years	Team	Apps	(Gls)
2000–2003	Mainz 05 II	40	(5)
2002–2005	Mainz 05	56	(5)
2005–2008	Schalke 04	9	(0)
2006–2007	→ Mainz 05 (loan)	27	(2)
2008	→ VfL Bochum (loan)	14	(3)
2008–2012	VfL Bochum	71	(8)
2010	→ VfL Bochum II	12	(4)
2012–2014	1. FC Kaiserslautern	15	(1)
2015–2016	SC Hessen Dreieich	7	(3)
Total		231	(28)

International career
2003–2004	Germany U21	6	(0)
- * Club domestic league appearances and goals

Mimoun Azaouagh (born 17 November 1982) is a German former professional footballer who played as a midfielder.

== Career ==
Azaouagh started his career with the youth teams of FSV Frankfurt and Eintracht Frankfurt. In 1999, he moved to Mainz 05. In the 2000–01 season, he played his first matches for the second team of Mainz in the Oberliga. Azaouagh was promoted from the amateur team to the professional team in September 2002, and from then on given a regular spot in the team. When he helped them reach promotion to the Bundesliga in the 2003–04 season, he had played 48 games and scored four goals in the 2. Bundesliga. Azaouagh missed the first three matches of Mainz in the Bundesliga due to illness, but already in his second match at the highest German level he scored a goal. During a match against VfL Wolfsburg on 30 October 2004, he suffered a serious injury after clash with an opposing player, ruling him out for six months. Later in the season, he was recompensed financially for this injury.

In late 2004, however, Azaouagh moved to Schalke 04. The move was controversial, as the club initially refused to pay the transfer fee. After months had passed, the clubs found an agreement.

It took months of rehabilitation before Azaough could play again. On 14 January 2005, he made his debut for Schalke 04 in a friendly against SC Paderborn. On 4 March 2005, he played his first Bundesliga match for the club against Hannover 96. Azaough scored his first goal in the UEFA Cup match against Palermo on 16 March 2006. In the season 2006–07, he played on a loan for Mainz 05 again. Upon his return to Schalke, he was mostly a reserve, and as he consequence of his lack of playing time, he was loaned out again; this time to VfL Bochum for the rest of the season. After the 2007–08 season, Azaouagh made the move permanent. His contract ran until 30 June 2012.

Azaouagh joined fellow 2. Bundesliga club 1. FC Kaiserslautern on a free transfer in summer 2012. After the expiration of his contract in 2014 he left the club.

Azaouagh was without a club from July 2014 and joined SC Hessen Dreieich in the fifth-tier Hessenliga in December 2015 until the end of the season. He retired from football after the season.

== International career ==
Azaouagh played for the Germany under-21 national team. He announced on 2 October 2009 that he would now play for the Morocco national team.

== Personal life ==
Azaouagh is of Berber origin, hailing from Beni Sidel, Morocco. He is fluent in German, English and Berber, but not Arabic. His brothers Ahmed and Aziz are also football players.

On 12 February 2015, German newspaper Bild, published a controversial article with the title "Former Bundesliga-Star now a Salafist?". Azaouagh denied this, saying he was a Muslim but not a salafist. He also claimed that the Bild article was responsible for him not being able to get a new contract.

== Career statistics ==
As of 17 January 2015

Appearances and goals by club, season and competition
Club	Season	League			DFB-Pokal		League Cup		Continental		Total	
Club	Season	Division	Apps	Goals	Apps	Goals	Apps	Goals	Apps	Goals	Apps	Goals
Mainz 05 II	2000–01	Oberliga Südwest	1	0	—		—		—		1	0
Mainz 05 II	2001–02	Oberliga Südwest	33	4	1	0	—		—		34	4
Mainz 05 II	2002–03	Oberliga Südwest	6	1	1	0	—		—		7	1
Mainz 05 II	Total		40	5	2	0	0	0	0	0	42	5
Mainz 05	2002–03	2. Bundesliga	24	3	1	0	—		—		25	3
Mainz 05	2003–04	2. Bundesliga	24	1	1	0	—		—		25	1
Mainz 05	2004–05	Bundesliga	8	1	2	1	—		—		10	2
Mainz 05	Total		56	5	4	1	0	0	0	0	60	6
Schalke 04	2004–05	Bundesliga	0	0	0	0	—		0	0	0	0
Schalke 04	2005–06	Bundesliga	4	0	0	0	0	0	2	1	6	1
Schalke 04	2007–08	Bundesliga	5	0	2	0	2	0	1	0	10	0
Schalke 04	Total		9	0	2	0	2	0	3	1	16	1
Mainz 05 (loan)	2006–07	Bundesliga	27	2	1	0	—		—		28	2
VfL Bochum (loan)	2007–08	Bundesliga	14	3	0	0	—		—		14	3
VfL Bochum	2008–09	Bundesliga	30	1	2	0	—		—		32	1
VfL Bochum	2009–10	Bundesliga	17	3	1	0	—		—		18	3
VfL Bochum	2010–11	2. Bundesliga	13	2	0	0	—		—		13	2
VfL Bochum	2011–12	2. Bundesliga	11	2	0	0	—		—		11	2
VfL Bochum	Total		71	8	3	0	0	0	0	0	74	8
VfL Bochum II	2010–11	Regionalliga West	12	4	—		—		—		12	4
1. FC Kaiserslautern	2012–13	Bundesliga	15	1	1	0	—		—		16	1
1. FC Kaiserslautern	2013–14	Bundesliga	0	0	0	0	—		—		0	0
1. FC Kaiserslautern	Total		15	1	1	0	0	0	0	1	16	1
Career total			244	28	13	1	2	0	3	1	262	30
