= Jürgen Duah =

German footballer

Personal information
- Full name: Jürgen Molinari Duah
- Date of birth: 19 December 1985 (age 40)
- Place of birth: Dortmund, West Germany
- Height: 1.78 m (5 ft 10 in)
- Position: Defender

Youth career
- SV Gerthe
- –2004: VfL Bochum

Senior career*
Years	Team	Apps	(Gls)
2004–2007	SG Wattenscheid 09 II		
2006–2007	SG Wattenscheid 09	29	(0)
2007–2010	VfL Bochum II	93	(4)
2010–2012	SC Preußen Münster	49	(1)
- * Club domestic league appearances and goals as of 15 July 2012

Jürgen Duah (born 19 December 1985) is a German football defender who played in the 3. Liga for SC Preußen Münster.

== Career statistics ==
Club performance			League		Cup		Total	
Season	Club	League	Apps	Goals	Apps	Goals	Apps	Goals
Germany			League		DFB-Pokal		Total	
2004–05	SG Wattenscheid 09 II	Verbandsliga Westfalen			—			
2005–06	SG Wattenscheid 09 II	Verbandsliga Westfalen			—			
2006–07	SG Wattenscheid 09 II	Verbandsliga Westfalen			—			
2005–06	SG Wattenscheid 09	Regionalliga Nord	3	0	—		3	0
2006–07	SG Wattenscheid 09	Oberliga Westfalen	26	0	—		26	0
2007–08	VfL Bochum II	Oberliga Westfalen	31	3	—		31	3
2008–09	VfL Bochum II	Regionalliga West	32	1	—		32	1
2009–10	VfL Bochum II	Regionalliga West	30	0	—		30	0
2010–11	SC Preußen Münster	Regionalliga West	29	0	1	0	30	0
2011–12	SC Preußen Münster	3. Liga	18	1	—		18	1
Total	Germany				1	0		
Career total					1	0		
