= Marc Pfertzel =

French footballer (born 1981)

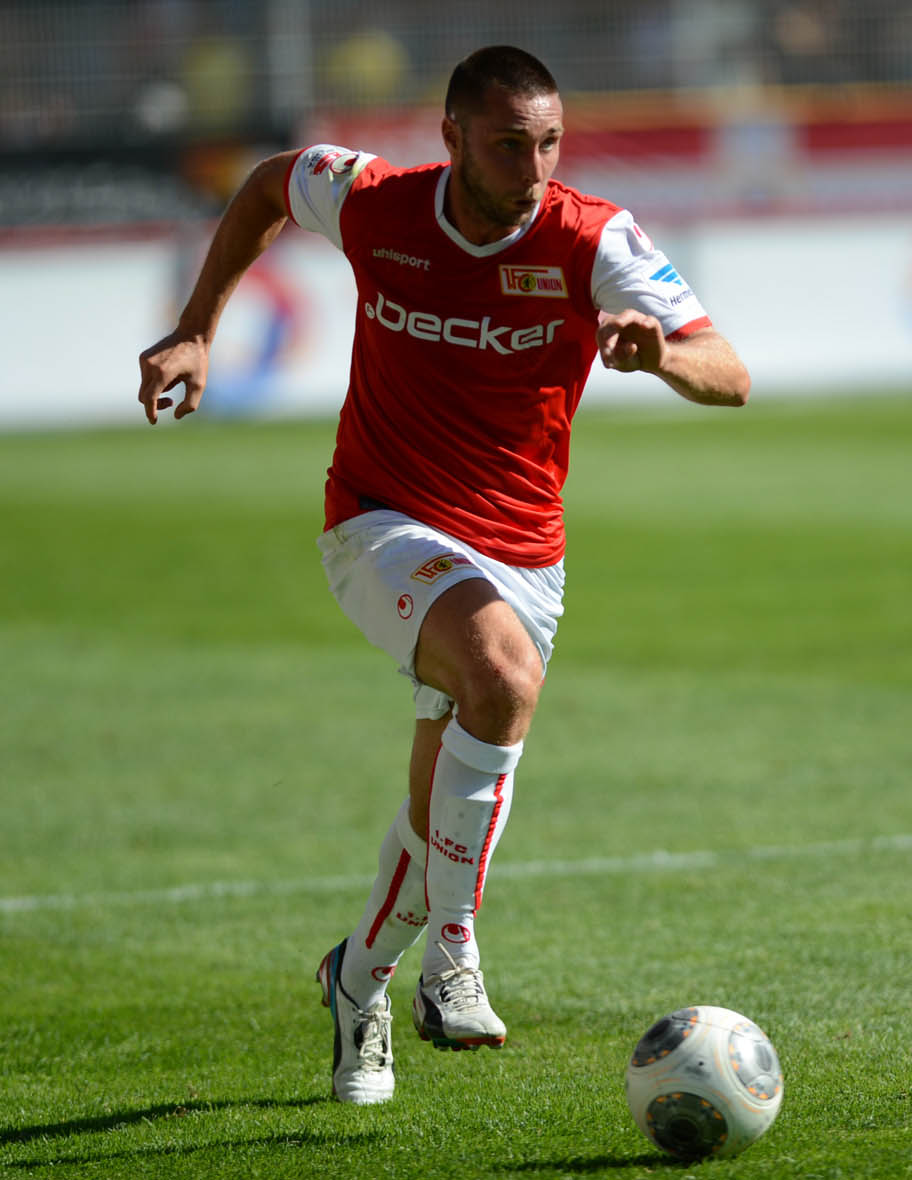
- Pfertzel in 2013

Personal information
- Date of birth: 21 May 1981 (age 45)
- Place of birth: Mulhouse, France
- Height: 1.82 m (6 ft 0 in)
- Positions: Right winger; right wing-back

Team information
- Current team: FU Narbonne (Manager)

Youth career
- 1995–1999: Mulhouse

Senior career*
Years	Team	Apps	(Gls)
1999–2001	FC Basel		
2001	Sochaux		
2001–2002	Troyes		
2002–2003	Sète	36	(4)
2003–2007	Livorno	106	(4)
2007–2010	VfL Bochum	76	(2)
2009–2010	→ VfL Bochum II	2	(0)
2011	Kavala	11	(1)
2011–2014	Union Berlin	87	(2)
2014–2015	SV Sandhausen	8	(0)
2016–2017	Sète	10	(1)
2017–2018	Stade Balarucois		

Managerial career
- 2018–2019: Sète (reserves)
- 2019–: FU Narbonne
- * Club domestic league appearances and goals

Marc Pfertzel (born 21 May 1981) is a French former professional footballer who played as a right winger or right wing-back, and manager of French club FU Narbonne.

== Playing career ==
=== France ===
Born in Mulhouse, Pfertzel started his career in the youth team of his local club FC Mulhouse in Alsace.

In 2001–02, Pfertzel moved to Ligue 1 club Troyes, but played only for the reserve team. So he decided to leave the club after only one season and moved Championnat National club FC Sète 34. In the 2002–03 season, he played 36 matches for the club from Southern France.

=== Livorno ===
Again he stayed only for one season at a club. In July 2003, Pfertzel moved to Italian Serie B club Livorno. The club was promoted in his first season into the Serie A and Pfertzel played 84 matches in that league. The highlight of his Livorno period was the qualification to the UEFA Cup in the 2006–07 season. Since Juventus, Lazio and Fiorentina were punished because of the 2006 Serie A scandal, Livorno climbed from the ninth to the sixth spot and was allowed to play in the 2006–07 UEFA Cup. Livorno did quite well and was eliminated in the round of the last 32 by later finalist Espanyol.

=== VfL Bochum ===
In the summer of 2007, Pfertzel moved to German Bundesliga club VfL Bochum. He signed a four-year contract which was valid in the first and second Bundesliga. To make this transfer happening, Pfertzel even accepted a lower salary so that this money could be invested in the transfer fee.

=== Union Berlin ===
On 25 May 2011, it was announced that Pfertzel had secured a free transfer to German 2. Bundesliga side Union Berlin on a two-year deal.

=== SV Sandhausen ===
In July 2014, Pfertzel left Union Berlin and joined fellow 2. Bundesliga club SV Sandhausen. However, he only earned caps in the first leg of the campaign, being told to be redundant by head coach Alois Schwartz in the winter break. At the end of the 2014–15 season, Pfertzel retired from professional football.

== Coaching career ==
After retiring at the end of the 2017–18 season, Pfertzel became the manager of the reserve of his former club FC Sète 34.

== Personal life ==
Upon his retirement from professional football in 2015, he moved back to his native France, settling in Paris. There he works for an insurance company, specializing in serving athletes.

== Career statistics ==
Appearances and goals by club, season and competition
Club	Season	League			National cup		League cup		Europe		Total	
Club	Season	Division	Apps	Goals	Apps	Goals	Apps	Goals	Apps	Goals	Apps	Goals
FC Basel	1999–00	Nationalliga A					–					
FC Basel	2000–01	Nationalliga A					–					
FC Basel	Total						0	0				
Sochaux	2000–01	Division 2							–			
Troyes	2001–02	Division 1										
FC Sète 34	2002–03	Division 3	36	4					–			
AS Livorno	2003–04	Serie B	20	0			–		–			
AS Livorno	2004–05	Serie A	26	0			–		–			
AS Livorno	2005–06	Serie A	29	2			–		–			
AS Livorno	2006–07	Serie A	30	2			–		7	0		
AS Livorno	Total		105	4					7	0		
VfL Bochum	2007–08	Bundesliga	28	0	1	0	–		–		29	0
VfL Bochum	2008–09	Bundesliga	27	2	2	1	–		–		29	3
VfL Bochum	2009–10	Bundesliga	18	0	2	0	–		–		20	0
VfL Bochum	2010–11	2. Bundesliga	3	0	1	0	–		–		4	0
VfL Bochum	Total		76	2	6	1	0	0	0	0	82	3
VfL Bochum II	2009–10	Regionalliga West	2	0	–		–		–		2	0
Kavala	2010–11	Super League Greece	1	1	0	0	–		–		0	0
Union Berlin	2011–12	2. Bundesliga	29	1	1	0	–		–		30	1
Union Berlin	2012–13	2. Bundesliga	24	1	2	0	–		–		26	1
Union Berlin	Total		53	2	3	0	0	0	0	0	56	2
Career total												
