= Tom Moosmayer =

Belgian footballer

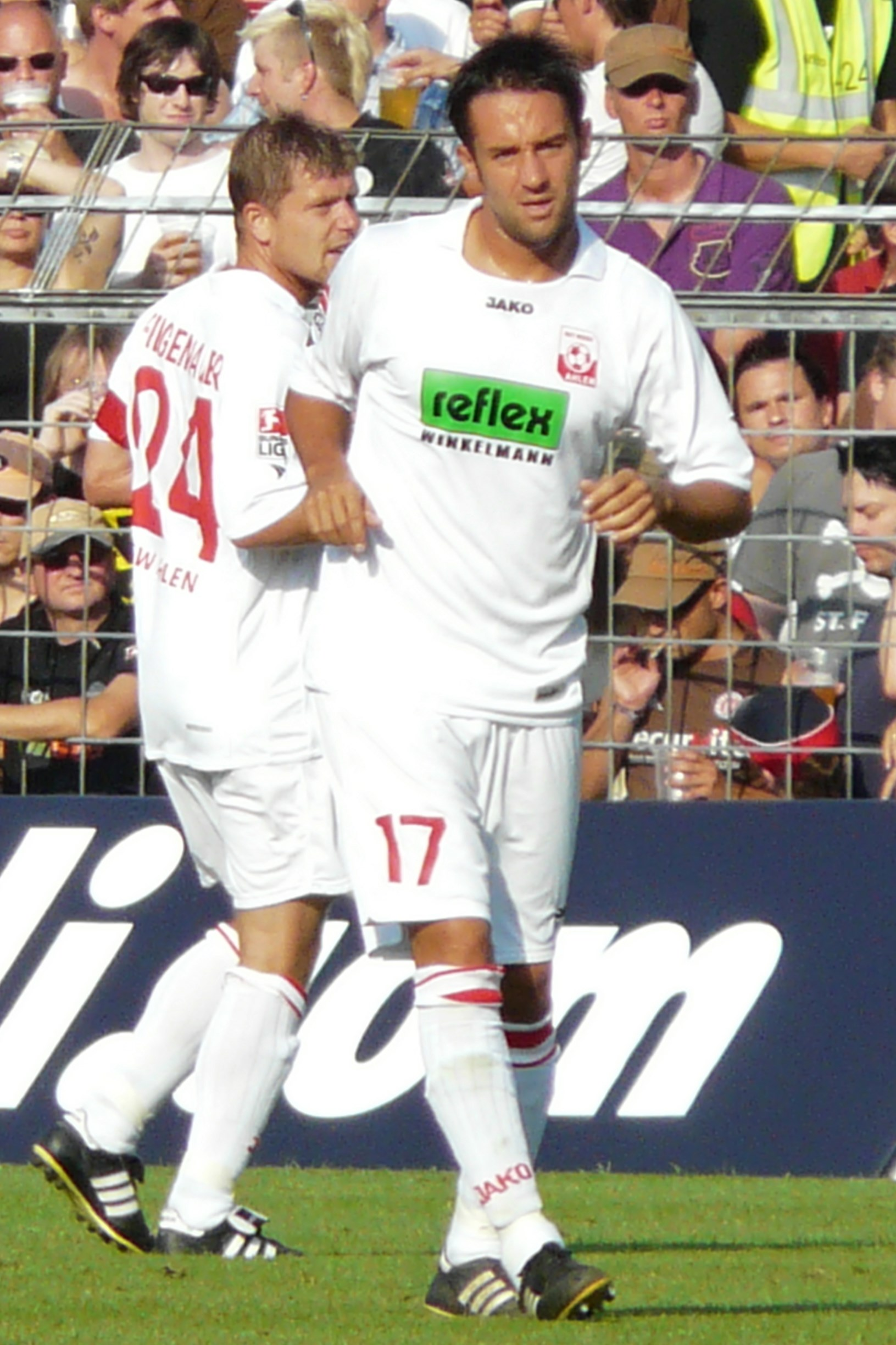
- Moosmayer with Rot-Weiss Ahlen

Personal information
- Date of birth: 1 October 1979 (age 47)
- Place of birth: Eupen, Belgium
- Height: 1.78 m (5 ft 10 in)
- Position: Midfielder

Youth career
- –2003: FC Roetgen

Senior career*
Years	Team	Apps	(Gls)
2003–2007	Alemannia Aachen II	69	(17)
2007–2009	Kickers Emden	71	(4)
2009–2010	Rot-Weiss Ahlen	6	(0)
2010	Kickers Offenbach	11	(0)
2010–2013	Wuppertaler SV Borussia	84	(11)
2013	FC Roetgen	0	(0)
2013–2014	Alemannia Aachen	0	(0)
2014–2017	FC Roetgen	43	(14)

Managerial career
- 2016–2023: FC Roetgen (sporting director)
- 2018: FC Roetgen (interim manager)
- * Club domestic league appearances and goals

Tom Moosmayer (born 1 October 1979) is a Belgian former professional footballer who played as a midfielder, spending his entire career in Germany
