= Christian Pauli =

Austrian-German footballer

Personal information
- Date of birth: 30 January 1992 (age 34)
- Place of birth: Osnabrück, Germany
- Height: 1.73 m (5 ft 8 in)
- Position: Striker

Team information
- Current team: FC Kitzbühel
- Number: 10

Youth career
- –2005: VfL Büren
- 2005–2010: VfL Osnabrück

Senior career*
Years	Team	Apps	(Gls)
2010–2013	VfL Osnabrück	23	(2)
2011–2014	VfL Osnabrück II	34	(16)
2013	→ SV Wilhelmshaven (loan)	4	(0)
2014–2015	BSV Rehden	16	(0)
2015–	FC Kitzbühel	51	(14)
- * Club domestic league appearances and goals as of 31 July 2017

Christian Pauli (born 30 January 1992) is an Austrian-German footballer who plays as a striker for Austrian third-tier side FC Kitzbühel.

He made his debut for VfL Osnabrück in April 2011, as a substitute for a Benjamin Siegert in a 4–0 defeat to Hertha BSC in the 2. Bundesliga. He played in the last five matches of the 2010–11 season, and in the second leg of a playoff against Dynamo Dresden, which Osnabrück lost, relegating them to the 3. Liga. The following season, he made eighteen appearances, scoring one goal. In January 2013, he signed for SV Wilhelmshaven on a six-month loan.
