= Thomas Paulus =

German footballer

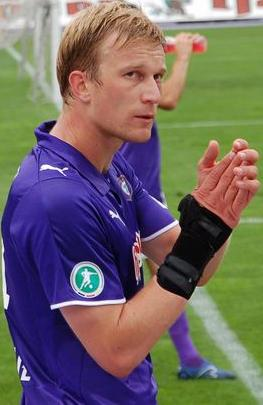
- Paulus with Erzgebirge Aue

Personal information
- Date of birth: 14 March 1982 (age 44)
- Place of birth: Kelheim, West Germany
- Height: 1.91 m (6 ft 3 in)
- Position: Centre-back

Youth career
- –1994: TuS Töging
- 1994–1997: TV Parsberg
- 1997–2003: 1. FC Nürnberg

Senior career*
| Years | Team | Apps | (Gls) |
| 2003–2007 | 1. FC Nürnberg | 46 | (1) |
| 2007–2015 | Erzgebirge Aue | 188 | (13) |
| 2015–2017 | Jahn Regensburg | 10 | (0) |
| Total | | 244 | (14) |
- * Club domestic league appearances and goals

Thomas Paulus (born 14 March 1982) is a German former professional footballer who played as a centre-back. He spent three seasons in the Bundesliga with 1. FC Nürnberg. He joined Jahn Regensburg in 2015. He retired at the end of the 2016–17 season and became the manager of the Jahn Fußballschule (Jahn Footballing School).

== Honours ==
1. FC Nürnberg

- DFB-Pokal: 2006–07
