= Christoph Dabrowski =

German footballer and manager

Personal information
- Birth name: Krzysztof Dąbrowski
- Date of birth: 1 August 1978 (age 48)
- Place of birth: Katowice, Poland
- Height: 1.95 m (6 ft 5 in)
- Position: Defensive midfielder

Youth career
- 1988–1993: 1. FC Schöneberg
- 1993–1994: BFC Preußen Berlin
- 1994–1995: Hertha BSC
- 1995–1996: Werder Bremen

Senior career*
Years	Team	Apps	(Gls)
1996–2001	Werder Bremen II	51	(2)
1998–2001	Werder Bremen	49	(3)
2001–2003	Arminia Bielefeld	57	(5)
2003–2006	Hannover 96	78	(3)
2006–2013	VfL Bochum	192	(23)
2009	→ VfL Bochum II	2	(0)
Total		429	(36)

International career
1997–1999	Germany U21	9	(1)
1998	Germany Olympic	4	(0)
1999–2004	Germany B	5	(0)

Managerial career
- 2018–2021: Hannover 96 II
- 2021–2022: Hannover 96
- 2022–2024: Rot-Weiss Essen
- 2026: Erzgebirge Aue
- * Club domestic league appearances and goals

Christoph Dabrowski (born Krzysztof Dąbrowski; 1 August 1978) is a German football manager, who last coached Erzgebirge Aue. He played for Werder Bremen, Arminia Bielefeld, Hannover 96 and VfL Bochum.

== Club career ==
On 11 May 1999, Dabrowski scored the decisive goal in Werder Bremen's 1–0 win against Schalke 04 and greatly contributed to the club's Bundesliga survival. It was also the first match with manager Thomas Schaaf in charge of the team. Shortly afterwards he helped them win the 1998–99 DFB-Pokal, starting in the final against Bayern Munich as Bremen won on penalties.

== International career ==
Of Polish descent, Dabrowski owns dual German-Polish citizenship and in October 2005 the Polish Football Association requested to nominate Dabrowski for their national team. However, the FIFA rejected the request because Dabrowski was not entitled to play for Poland, as he had already played for the German Team 2006.

== Managerial career ==
On 10 October 2013, Dabrowski was named as the new assistant manager of Hannover 96's reserve team, Hannover 96 II. He left this position on 28 January 2014, and was picked as the new manager of the U17 team of Hannover 96.

On 11 June 2015, Dabrowski was named as the new assistant coach of Hannover 96 under manager Michael Frontzeck.

On 1 December 2021, Dabrowski was announced as interim coach of Hannover 96 after Jan Zimmermann was sacked. The appointment was made permanent on 21 December 2021, after the team had won two out of three matches under Dabrowski; he received a contract until the end of the season. After the 2021–22 season he left Hannover. In June 2022, he was appointed by Rot-Weiss Essen. He was sacked in December 2024.

In February 2026, he was named the new head coach of Erzgebirge Aue. In April, he was sacked.

== Personal life ==
Dabrowski was born in Katowice and emigrated in the age of six years with his mother as an ethnic German (Aussiedler) – his maternal grandfather had served in the German Wehrmacht and therefore got an Aussiedler status – from his country of birth and settled in West-Berlin.

== Career statistics ==
Appearances and goals by club, season and competition
Club	Season	League			DFB-Pokal		DFB-Ligapokal		Europe		Total	
Club	Season	Division	Apps	Goals	Apps	Goals	Apps	Goals	Apps	Goals	Apps	Goals
Werder Bremen II	1996–97	Regionalliga Nord	16	0	—		—		—		16	0
Werder Bremen II	1997–98	Regionalliga Nord	23	2	0	0	—		—		23	2
Werder Bremen II	1998–99	Regionalliga Nord	9	0	1	0	—		—		10	0
Werder Bremen II	1999–00	Regionalliga Nord	0	0	0	0	—		—		0	0
Werder Bremen II	2000–01	Regionalliga Nord	3	0	0	0	—		—		3	0
Werder Bremen II	Total		51	2	1	0	0	0	0	0	52	2
Werder Bremen	1998–99	Bundesliga	15	1	2	0	—		—		17	1
Werder Bremen	1999–00	Bundesliga	28	2	4	1	1	0	6	1	39	4
Werder Bremen	2000–01	Bundesliga	6	0	0	0	—		0	0	6	0
Werder Bremen	Total		49	3	6	1	1	0	6	1	62	5
Arminia Bielefeld	2001–02	2. Bundesliga	30	4	2	0	—		—		32	4
Arminia Bielefeld	2002–03	Bundesliga	27	1	1	0	—		—		28	1
Arminia Bielefeld	Total		57	5	3	0	0	0	0	0	60	5
Hannover 96	2003–04	Bundesliga	27	0	2	0	—		—		29	0
Hannover 96	2004–05	Bundesliga	19	0	3	0	—		—		22	0
Hannover 96	2005–06	Bundesliga	32	3	2	0	—		—		34	3
Hannover 96	Total		78	3	7	0	0	0	0	0	85	3
VfL Bochum	2006–07	Bundesliga	31	3	3	0	—		—		34	3
VfL Bochum	2007–08	Bundesliga	28	5	2	0	—		—		30	5
VfL Bochum	2008–09	Bundesliga	31	6	1	0	—		—		32	6
VfL Bochum	2009–10	Bundesliga	29	1	2	0	—		—		31	1
VfL Bochum	2010–11	2. Bundesliga	29	4	1	0	—		—		30	4
VfL Bochum	2011–12	2. Bundesliga	30	2	3	1	—		—		33	3
VfL Bochum	2012–13	2. Bundesliga	14	2	2	0	—		—		16	2
VfL Bochum	Total		192	23	14	1	0	0	0	0	206	24
VfL Bochum II	2009–10	Regionalliga West	2	0	—		—		—		2	0
Career total			429	36	31	2	1	0	6	1	467	39

== Managerial statistics ==
As of match played 27 January 2023

Managerial record by team and tenure
Team	From	To	Record							
Team	From	To	G	W	D	L	GF	GA	GD	Win %
Hannover 96 II	1 July 2018	1 December 2021	81	33	14	34	115	111	+4	40.74
Hannover 96	1 December 2021	16 May 2022	21	9	4	8	28	31	−3	42.86
Rot-Weiss Essen	28 June 2022	9 December 2024	23	7	10	6	42	34	+8	30.43
Total			125	49	28	48	185	176	+9	39.20
