= Roman Prokoph =

German footballer (born 1985)

Personal information
- Date of birth: 6 August 1985 (age 41)
- Place of birth: Berlin, West Germany
- Height: 1.83 m (6 ft 0 in)
- Position: Forward

Youth career
- –1995: SV Berlin-Chemie Adlershof
- 1995–2004: Union Berlin

Senior career*
Years	Team	Apps	(Gls)
2004–2005	Union Berlin	39	(4)
2006	Ludwigsfelder FC	7	(3)
2006–2007	FC St. Pauli	10	(0)
2006–2008	FC St. Pauli II	56	(23)
2008–2011	VfL Bochum II	58	(20)
2009–2011	VfL Bochum	25	(0)
2011–2012	Kapfenberger SV	10	(0)
2012	SpVgg Unterhaching	9	(1)
2012–2013	Sportfreunde Lotte	37	(8)
2013–2014	VfL Osnabrück	6	(1)
2014–2016	Hannover 96 II	74	(39)
2016–2019	FC Köln II	96	(39)
2019–2021	Fortuna Köln	56	(22)
2021–2023	Wuppertaler SV	61	(19)
2024	Kirchheimer SC	9	(6)
- * Club domestic league appearances and goals as of 14:27, 4 July 2024 (UTC)

Roman Prokoph (born 6 August 1985) is a German professional footballer who most recently played as a forward for Kirchheimer SC.

== Career ==
Born in Berlin, Prokoph began his career with SV Berlin-Chemie Adlershof and joined in 1995 the youth team of Union Berlin. He was promoted to Union Berlin's first team after nine years, where he played 46 games and scored eleven goals. On 1 January 2006, he left his team and signed for Ludwigsfelder FC. Here he earned only seven caps and scored three goals in six months.

In summer 2006, he signed for FC St. Pauli. He played ten games in the Regionalliga Nord for St. Pauli and was a key player of the reserve. In July 2008, he signed for the reserve team of VfL Bochum and became the team captain during the 2008–09 season. On 23 November 2009, he earned his first Bundesliga match against Hamburger SV and signed his first professional contract with the Ruhrpott club on 9 February 2010.

On 10 June 2019, it was confirmed that Prokoph would join Fortuna Köln ahead of the 2019–20 season.

== Career statistics ==
As of 4 July 2024

Appearances and goals by club, season and competition
Club	Season	League			Cup		Other		Total	
Club	Season	Division	Apps	Goals	Apps	Goals	Apps	Goals	Apps	Goals
Union Berlin	2004–05	Regionalliga Nord	29	2	1	0	–		30	2
Union Berlin	2005–06	Oberliga NOFV-Nord	10	2	—		–		10	2
Union Berlin	Total		39	4	1	0	0	0	40	4
Ludwigsfelder FC	2005–06	Oberliga NOFV-Nord	7	3	—		–		7	3
FC St. Pauli	2006–07	Regionalliga Nord	10	0	0	0	–		10	0
FC St. Pauli II	2006–07	Oberliga Nord	24	7	—		–		24	7
FC St. Pauli II	2007–08	Oberliga Nord	32	16	—		–		32	16
FC St. Pauli II	Total		56	23	0	0	0	0	56	23
VfL Bochum II	2008–09	Regionalliga West	31	12	—		–		31	12
VfL Bochum II	2009–10	Regionalliga West	15	2	—		–		15	2
VfL Bochum II	2010–11	Regionalliga West	12	6	—		–		12	6
VfL Bochum II	Total		58	20	0	0	0	0	58	20
VfL Bochum	2009–10	Bundesliga	15	0	0	0	–		15	0
VfL Bochum	2010–11	2. Bundesliga	10	0	1	0	–		11	0
VfL Bochum	Total		25	0	1	0	0	0	26	0
Kapfenberger SV	2011–12	Austrian Bundesliga	10	0	1	0	–		11	0
SpVgg Unterhaching	2011–12	3. Liga	9	1	0	0	–		9	1
Sportfreunde Lotte	2012–13	Regionalliga West	37	8	0	0	2	0	39	8
VfL Osnabrück	2013–14	3. Liga	6	1	1	0	–		7	1
Hannover 96 II	2013–14	Regionalliga Nord	14	6	—		–		14	6
Hannover 96 II	2014–15	Regionalliga Nord	29	15	—		–		29	15
Hannover 96 II	2016–16	Regionalliga Nord	31	18	—		–		31	18
Hannover 96 II	Total		74	39	0	0	0	0	74	39
1. FC Köln II	2016–17	Regionalliga West	32	20	—		–		32	20
1. FC Köln II	2017–18	Regionalliga West	32	11	—		–		32	11
1. FC Köln II	2018–19	Regionalliga West	32	8	—		–		32	8
1. FC Köln II	Total		96	39	0	0	0	0	96	39
Fortuna Köln	2019–20	Regionalliga West	23	7	—		–		23	7
Fortuna Köln	2020–21	Regionalliga West	33	15	—		–		33	15
Fortuna Köln	Total		56	22	0	0	0	0	56	22
Wuppertaler SV	2021–22	Regionalliga West	34	12	—		–		34	12
Wuppertaler SV	2022–23	Regionalliga West	27	7	—		–		27	7
Wuppertaler SV	Total		61	19	0	0	0	0	61	19
Kirchheimer SC	2023–24	Bayernliga Süd	9	6	—		–		9	6
Career total			553	175	4	0	2	0	559	175
