= VfL Bochum II =

German football reserve team

VfL Bochum 1848 FG e. V. II
- Full name: Verein für Leibesübungen Bochum; 1848 Fußballgemeinschaft eingetragener Verein II
- Founded: 14 April 1938 / 1 July 2024
- Dissolved: 30 June 2015
- Ground: Ruhrstadion
- Capacity: 26,000
- League: Regionalliga West (IV)
- 2025–26: Regionalliga West, 13th of 18
- Website: www.vfl-bochum.de
Home colours	Away colours	Third colours

VfL Bochum II (also known as VfL Bochum Amateure, VfL Bochum U-21 or VfL Bochum U-23) is the reserve team of German football club VfL Bochum.

The team has made two appearances in the first round of the DFB-Pokal, in 1984–85 and 2005–06. Since 2008 the team has been playing in the tier four Regionalliga West. The team was intended to be the final step between Bochum's youth setup and the first team, and was usually made up of promising youngsters between the age of 18 and 23, with a few veteran players drafted in to provide experience.

== History ==
The team first made an appearance in the highest football league in Westphalia, the Verbandsliga Westfalen, in 1975 but failed to qualify for the new Oberliga Westfalen in 1978 and had to remain in the Verbandsliga Westfalen until 1982 when a league championship took it up to Oberliga level.

Between 1982 and 1999 the team predominantly played in the Oberliga, only interrupted by stints back in the Verbandsliga in 1988–89 and from 1993 to 1997. After its return to the Oberliga in 1997 the team was a much stronger side, winning the league in 1999 and moving up to the Regionalliga West/Südwest for a season. It played in the Oberliga again from 2001 to 2008, finishing runners-up on three occasions but not quite able to move back up to the Regionalliga again.

In 2008 a third place allowed the team qualification to the new Regionalliga West where it has played since, finishing fourteenth in five out of six seasons between 2008 and 2014.

The team also made two appearances in the German Cup, reaching the second round in 1984–85 when it lost to VfB Stuttgart and the first round in 2005–06, when it lost to Erzgebirge Aue.

In March 2015 the club announced that it would withdraw its reserve side from competition at the end of the 2014–15 season to concentrate on its youth teams instead.

The second team of VfL Bochum was reintegrated into the Oberliga Westfalen after the Westphalian Football and Athletics Association (FLVW) had decided to do so This affects the 2024/25 season. The decision was confirmed by the Association's Sports Court. The second team will now participate in regular season play.

== Honours ==
The team's honours:

- Landesliga Westfalen
  - Champions: 1975
- Verbandsliga Westfalen
  - Champions: 1982
  - Runners-up: 1989, 1997
- Oberliga Westfalen
  - Champions: 1999
  - Runners-up: 2001, 2003, 2005, 2025
- Westphalia Cup
  - Runners-up: 2005

== Seasons since 1958–59 ==
The season-by-season performance of the team:

Season	League									German Cup	League top scorer		Notes
Season	Division (Level)	P	W	D	L	F	A	Pts	Pos	German Cup	League top scorer		Notes
1957–58	Kreisliga Westfalen (VI)								1st↑	DNQ			
1958–59	Bezirksliga Westfalen (V)	30	19	4	7	65	37	42	2nd	DNQ			
1959–60	Bezirksliga Westfalen (V)	30	16	3	11	73	46	35	4th	DNQ			
1960–61	Bezirksliga Westfalen (V)	30	21	6	3	76	27	48	1st↑	DNQ			
1961–62	Landesliga Westfalen (IV)	26	6	11	9	43	53	23	11th	DNQ			
1962–63	Landesliga Westfalen (IV)	28	10	9	9	34	39	29	7th	DNQ			
1963–64	Landesliga Westfalen (IV)	30	11	6	13	54	50	28	12th	DNQ			
1964–65	Landesliga Westfalen (IV)	30	15	0	15	56	44	30	8th	DNQ			
1965–66	Landesliga Westfalen (IV)	28	11	5	12	59	48	27	10th	DNQ			
1966–67	Landesliga Westfalen (IV)	30	10	6	14	46	52	26	14th↓	DNQ			
1967–68	Bezirksliga Westfalen (V)	28	11	3	14	67	52	25	12th	DNQ			
1968–69	Bezirksliga Westfalen (V)	30	19	4	7	77	38	42	2nd	DNQ			
1969–70	Bezirksliga Westfalen (V)	30	14	6	10	71	47	34	5th	DNQ			
1970–71	Bezirksliga Westfalen (V)	28	16	5	7	48	32	37	2nd	DNQ			
1971–72	Bezirksliga Westfalen (V)	30	17	7	6	73	32	41	2nd	DNQ			
1972–73	Bezirksliga Westfalen (V)	30	24	5	1	87	11	53	1st↑	DNQ			
1973–74	Landesliga Westfalen (IV)	32	12	8	12	53	46	32	7th	DNQ			
1974–75	Landesliga Westfalen (IV)	30	18	9	3	80	28	45	1st↑	DNQ			
1975–76	Verbandsliga Westfalen (III)	34	11	8	15	38	49	30	12th	DNQ			
1976–77	Verbandsliga Westfalen (III)	34	9	13	12	43	42	31	12th	DNQ			
1977–78	Verbandsliga Westfalen (III)	34	10	11	13	52	57	31	12th	DNQ			
1978–79	Verbandsliga Westfalen (IV)	30	7	14	9	32	33	28	10th	DNQ			(Note: The Oberliga Westfalen was introduced (1978–79), which moved the Verbandsliga Westfalen down one level on the West German league pyramid.)
1979–80	Verbandsliga Westfalen (IV)	30	14	8	8	51	29	36	3rd	DNQ			
1980–81	Verbandsliga Westfalen (IV)	30	14	5	11	53	43	33	6th	DNQ			
1981–82	Verbandsliga Westfalen (IV)	32	23	6	3	85	29	52	1st↑	DNQ			
1982–83	Oberliga Westfalen (III)	34	12	8	14	53	55	32	13th	DNQ			
1983–84	Oberliga Westfalen (III)	34	14	4	16	61	54	32	11th	DNQ	Riemann	14	
1984–85	Oberliga Westfalen (III)	34	14	5	15	45	53	33	7th	R2			
1985–86	Oberliga Westfalen (III)	32	10	9	13	52	47	29	11th	DNQ	Will	10	
1986–87	Oberliga Westfalen (III)	30	10	6	14	41	55	26	13th	DNQ			
1987–88	Oberliga Westfalen (III)	30	8	9	13	34	48	25	14th↓	DNQ			
1988–89	Verbandsliga Westfalen (IV)	30	17	10	3	60	25	44	2nd↑	DNQ			
1989–90	Oberliga Westfalen (III)	30	9	10	11	45	43	28	9th	DNQ	Jürgens, Kovacec	10	
1990–91	Oberliga Westfalen (III)	30	10	12	8	46	41	32	7th	DNQ			
1991–92	Oberliga Westfalen (III)	30	7	7	16	39	56	21	13th	DNQ			
1992–93	Oberliga Westfalen (III)	30	3	11	20	23	60	17	18th↓	DNQ	Gebker	6	
1993–94	Verbandsliga Westfalen (IV)	30	12	8	10	43	33	32	7th	DNQ			
1994–95	Verbandsliga Westfalen (V)	30	14	9	7	58	36	37	3rd	DNQ			(Note: The Regionalligas were reintroduced (1994–95), which moved the Verbandsliga Westfalen down one level on the German league pyramid.)
1995–96	Verbandsliga Westfalen (V)	30	13	11	6	53	30	50	5th	DNQ			(Note: Starting with the 1995–96 season the German Football Association introduced three points for a win.)
1996–97	Verbandsliga Westfalen (V)	30	17	8	5	62	28	59	2nd↑	DNQ			
1997–98	Oberliga Westfalen (IV)	28	13	9	6	44	26	48	4th	DNQ			
1998–99	Oberliga Westfalen (IV)	30	18	7	5	64	25	61	1st↑	DNQ	Grad	17	
1999–00	Regionalliga West/Südwest (III)	36	11	7	18	57	69	40	15th↓	DNQ	Majewski	13	
2000–01	Oberliga Westfalen (IV)	36	23	7	6	87	39	76	2nd	DNQ	Siebert	22	
2001–02	Oberliga Westfalen (IV)	34	16	11	7	58	42	59	5th	DNQ	Joppe, Velardi	8	
2002–03	Oberliga Westfalen (IV)	34	24	5	5	79	35	77	2nd	DNQ	Velardi	17	
2003–04	Oberliga Westfalen (IV)	34	17	8	9	63	39	59	3rd	DNQ	Velardi	17	
2004–05	Oberliga Westfalen (IV)	34	22	4	8	78	39	70	2nd	DNQ	Velardi	17	
2005–06	Oberliga Westfalen (IV)	34	15	6	13	61	52	51	6th	R1	Hille	18	
2006–07	Oberliga Westfalen (IV)	34	13	5	16	61	49	44	10th	DNQ	Hille	18	
2007–08	Oberliga Westfalen (IV)	34	19	9	6	61	30	66	3rd↑	DNQ	El-Nounou	26	
2008–09	Regionalliga West (IV)	34	11	7	16	51	59	40	14th	DNQ	Prokoph	12	(Note: The 3. Liga was introduced (2008–09), which moved the Regionalliga West down one level on the German league pyramid.)
2009–10	Regionalliga West (IV)	34	16	9	9	50	32	57	3rd	DNQ	Aydın	14	
2010–11	Regionalliga West (IV)	34	8	10	16	49	64	34	14th	DNQ	Freiberger	9	
2011–12	Regionalliga West (IV)	36	11	8	17	42	64	41	14th	DNQ	Freiberger, Wassinger	12	
2012–13	Regionalliga West (IV)	38	11	13	14	47	42	46	14th	DNQ	Kreyer	12	
2013–14	Regionalliga West (IV)	36	8	9	19	34	53	33	14th	DNQ	Kreyer	14	
2014–15	Regionalliga West (IV)	34	8	6	20	46	58	30	16th	DNQ	Kurt	9	(Note: The VfL Bochum decided to withdraw the reserve team after the 2014–15 Regionalliga season.)
2015–2024	inactive												
2024–25	Oberliga Westfalen (V)	34	21	8	5	79	31	71	2nd↑	DNQ	Kojic	20	(Note: After approval by the Westphalian Football and Athletics Association, the reactivated second team of Bundesliga club VfL Bochum took part in the competition.)
2025–26	Regionalliga West (IV)	34	9	12	13	48	62	38	13th	DNQ	Hartwig	11	
2026–27	Regionalliga West (IV)	34	-	-	-	-	-	-	-	DNQ	-	-	

=== Key ===
↑ Promoted	↓ Relegated

== Players ==
As of 8 September 2026

Note: Flags indicate national team as defined under FIFA eligibility rules; some limited exceptions apply. Players may hold more than one non-FIFA nationality.

No.	Pos.	Nation	Player
1	GK	GER	Benjamin Bußmann
2	DF	GER	Luca Bernsdorf
3	DF	DEN	Gustav Schjøtt
4	DF	GER	Dominic Volkmer
5	MF	GER	Mohammed Tolba
6	MF	GER	Lars Holtkamp
7	MF	GER	Moritz Göttlicher
8	FW	GER	Till Winkelmann
9	FW	GER	Luis Pick
10	MF	GER	Ole van Eck
11	FW	GER	Amos Gerth
12	MF	KOS	Lirim Jashari
13	MF	GER	Ciwan Günes

No.	Pos.	Nation	Player
14	MF	GER	Henri Matter
15	DF	GER	Nicolas Abdat
16	MF	GER	Vahidin Turudija
17	DF	GER	Leon Sawas
18	GK	GER	Finn Kotyrba
19	DF	GER	Jaden Kibbe
21	MF	GER	Jan Nzeba-Bost
22	GK	GER	Noel Intven
25	MF	GER	Aurel Wagbe
29	FW	GER	Maximilian Dittgen
38	GK	GER	Hugo Rölleke
-	MF	GER	Janek Herzberg
-	MF	GER	Samuel Weber

=== Out on loan ===
Note: Flags indicate national team as defined under FIFA eligibility rules; some limited exceptions apply. Players may hold more than one non-FIFA nationality.

No.	Pos.	Nation	Player
24	FW	GER	Jonathan Akaegbobi (at VfB Stuttgart II until 30 June 2027)

== Coaches ==
=== Head coaches since 1994–95 ===
1994-07-01	2001-06-30	Bernard Dietz
2001-07-01	2006-04-06	Manfred Wölpper
2006-04-07	2006-06-30	Jürgen Heipertz
2006-07-01	2006-12-31	Sascha Lewandowski
2007-01-01	2011-06-30	Nicolas Michaty
2011-07-01	2013-06-30	Iraklis Metaxas
2013-07-01	2014-01-27	Dariusz Wosz
2014-01-27	2015-01-06	Thomas Reis
2015-01-06	2015-06-30	Dimitrios Grammozis
2015-06-30	2024-06-30	inactive
2024-07-01		Heiko Butscher
