= 2013–14 VfL Bochum season =

VfL Bochum
2013–14 season
- Chairman: Hans-Peter Villis
- Head coach: Peter Neururer
- Stadium: rewirpowerSTADION
- 2. Bundesliga: 15th
- DFB-Pokal: Second round
- Top goalscorer: League: Richard Sukuta-Pasu (6); All: Richard Sukuta-Pasu (6)
- Highest home attendance: 27,555 (vs. 1. FC Köln, 10 November 2013)
- Lowest home attendance: 10,255 (vs. FC Erzgebirge Aue, 29 March 2014)
- Average home league attendance: 16,166

The 2013–14 VfL Bochum season is the 76th season in club history.

== Review and events ==
During the winter break, the club mourned the death of long-time general manager Klaus Hilpert, who died on 20 January 2014.

== Matches ==
=== Legend ===
Win Draw Loss

=== Friendly matches ===
23 June 2013	SSVg Velbert	0–1	VfL Bochum	Velbert
15:00			Engelbrecht 23'	Stadium: Christopeit Sport Arena; Attendance: 1,200; Referee: Florian Heien

26 June 2013	Selection SC Willingen & TSV/FC Korbach	1–2	VfL Bochum	Willingen
18:30	Will 52'		Tiffert 42'; Engelbrecht 71'	Stadium: Hoppecketal-Stadion; Attendance: 700; Referee: Manuel Winkler (Bad Arolsen)

30 June 2013	SC Preußen Münster	1–1	VfL Bochum	Telgte
15:00	Kirsch 25'		Eyjólfsson 77'	Stadium: Takko-Stadion; Attendance: 3,500; Referee: Sören Storks

3 July 2013	VfL Bochum	2–1	Odense Boldklub	Herne
18:30	Aydın 79' (pen.); 85' (o.g.)		E. Larsen 49'	Stadium: Abisol-Arena; Attendance: 1,070; Referee: Christian Fischer

6 July 2013	VfL Bochum	0–2	Bayer 04 Leverkusen	Bochum
18:30			Castro 29'; Kießling 40'	Stadium: rewirpowerSTADION; Attendance: 4,526; Referee: Guido Winkmann

10 July 2013	FC Twente	0–3	VfL Bochum	Gütersloh
18:30			Engelbrecht 6'; Aydın 42'; Ćwielong 51'	Stadium: Heidewaldstadion; Attendance: 800; Referee: Thorben Siewer

14 July 2013	VfL Bochum	1–1	Aston Villa	Bochum
15:30	Tasaka 89'		Helenius 47'	Stadium: rewirpowerSTADION; Attendance: 7,398; Referee: Thorsten Kienhöfer

4 September 2013	SC Post Altenbochum	0–10	VfL Bochum	Bochum
18:00			Sukuta-Pasu 8', 21', 23'; Ilsø 17'; Jelavić 39', 53'; Tiffert 48'; Kreyer 62', 79'; Rothenbach 78'	Stadium: Karl-Hirsch-Stadion; Attendance: 500

6 September 2013	VfB Hüls	0–10	VfL Bochum	Marl
18:00			Ćwielong 33'; Tasaka 40'; Jungwirth 40'; Maltritz 43'; Aydın 52'; Sukuta-Pasu 57', 68'; Jelavić 61', 63'; Siegle 66' (o.g.)	Stadium: Stadion am Badeweiher; Attendance: 300

10 September 2013	TSG Sprockhövel	1–2	VfL Bochum	Sprockhövel
18:30	Yesilova 75'		Sukuta-Pasu 39'; Jelavić 52'	Stadium: Im Baumhof; Attendance: 1,000; Referee: Frank Lehmann (Iserlohn)

12 October 2013	VfL Bochum	5–1	Selection VfL Bochum U-19 & VfL Bochum II	Bochum
	Ilsø 1'; Ćwielong 25'; Sukuta-Pasu 29'; Aydın 53'; Tiffert 64'		Reinholz 71'

13 November 2013	Rot Weiss Ahlen	0–2	VfL Bochum	Ahlen
19:00			Aydın 62'; Sukuta-Pasu 65'	Stadium: Wersestadion; Attendance: 1,435

16 November 2013	VfL Bochum	1–2	Fortuna Düsseldorf	Bochum
14:00	Aydın 31'		Halloran 2', 63'	Stadium: rewirpowerSTADION; Attendance: 3,548; Referee: Martin Thomsen

12 January 2014	VfL Bochum	0–1	TSG 1899 Hoffenheim	San Pedro del Pinatar, Spain
15:00			Modeste 17'	Attendance: 250; Referee: Navaro Fuentes

14 January 2014	VfL Bochum	1–2	Borussia Dortmund	San Pedro del Pinatar, Spain
16:00	Kreyer 87'		Gyamerah 1' (o.g.); Jordanov 52'	Attendance: 3,000; Referee: Jorge Diaz Escudero

18 January 2014	VfL Bochum	0–2	Borussia Mönchengladbach	Bochum
16:00			Raffael 60'; Mlapa 66'	Stadium: rewirpowerSTADION; Attendance: 6,100; Referee: Sören Storks (Velen)

25 January 2014	VfL Bochum	2–1	VfL Bochum II	Bochum
11:00	Ćwielong 58'; Tiffert 80'		Holthaus 40'	Attendance: 300; Referee: Claas Steenebrügge

1 February 2014	VfL Bochum	2–2	FK Baník Most	Bochum
14:00	Ćwielong 11'; Ba 78' (o.g.)		Veselý 46'; Redzič 90'	Attendance: 150; Referee: Stefan Glasmacher (Alsdorf)

14 May 2014	Wuppertaler SV	1–1	VfL Bochum	Wuppertal
19:00	Löbe 20'		Kreyer 15'	Stadium: Stadion am Zoo; Attendance: 615; Referee: Gerrit Heiderich

=== 2. Bundesliga ===
==== League fixtures and results ====
21 July 2013 1	1. FC Union Berlin	1–2	VfL Bochum	Berlin
15:30	Kreilach 86'		Latza 64'; Maltritz 88' (pen.)	Stadium: Stadion An der Alten Försterei; Attendance: 18,823; Referee: Günter Perl (Pullach)

29 July 2013 2	VfL Bochum	1–1	Dynamo Dresden	Bochum
20:15	Fabian 10'		Fiél 69'	Stadium: rewirpowerSTADION; Attendance: 20,195; Referee: Tobias Stieler (Hamburg)

9 August 2013 3	FSV Frankfurt	1–0	VfL Bochum	Frankfurt am Main
18:30	Epstein 9'			Stadium: Volksbank Stadion; Attendance: 4,839; Referee: Tobias Christ (Münchweiler)

16 August 2013 4	VfL Bochum	2–2	FC St. Pauli	Bochum
20:30	Butscher 18'; Jungwirth 69'		Verhoek 23', 35'	Stadium: rewirpowerSTADION; Attendance: 23,028; Referee: Marco Fritz (Korb)

25 August 2013 5	Fortuna Düsseldorf	1–0	VfL Bochum	Düsseldorf
13:30	Reisinger 8'			Stadium: Esprit Arena; Attendance: 37,233; Referee: Michael Weiner (Giesen)

31 August 2013 6	VfL Bochum	4–2	SC Paderborn 07	Bochum
13:00	Aydın 46'; Fabian 71'; Ilsø 78'; Maltritz 84'		ten Voorde 44' (pen.); Bertels 45+1'	Stadium: rewirpowerSTADION; Attendance: 13,797; Referee: Christian Dietz (Kronach)

15 September 2013 7	SpVgg Greuther Fürth	0–2	VfL Bochum	Fürth
13:30			Ćwielong 4'; Tasaka 25'	Stadium: Trolli Arena; Attendance: 10,315; Referee: Robert Kempter (Sauldorf)

21 September 2013 8	VfL Bochum	1–2	VfR Aalen	Bochum
13:00	Aydin 13'		Lechleiter 3'; Valentini 70'	Stadium: rewirpowerSTADION; Attendance: 15,051; Referee: Robert Hartmann (Wangen)

29 September 2013 9	SV Sandhausen	1–0	VfL Bochum	Sandhausen
13:30	Adler 90+4'			Stadium: Hardtwaldstadion; Attendance: 4,700; Referee: Patrick Ittrich (Hamburg)

6 October 2013 10	VfL Bochum	0–1	FC Ingolstadt 04	Bochum
13:30			Groũ 78'	Stadium: rewirpowerSTADION; Attendance: 14,465; Referee: Harm Osmers (Hannover)

19 October 2013 11	FC Erzgebirge Aue	2–1	VfL Bochum	Aue
13:00	Koçer 48', 50'		Sukuta-Pasu 3'	Stadium: Sparkassen-Erzgebirgsstadion; Attendance: 8,800; Referee: Bibiana Steinhaus (Hannover)

28 October 2013 12	VfL Bochum	0–0	1. FC Kaiserslautern	Bochum
20:15				Stadium: rewirpowerSTADION; Attendance: 16,563; Referee: Florian Meyer (Burgdorf)

1 November 2013 13	FC Energie Cottbus	0–1	VfL Bochum	Cottbus
18:30			Sukuta-Pasu 37'	Stadium: Stadion der Freundschaft; Attendance: 9,219; Referee: Markus Wingenbach (Diez)

10 November 2013 14	VfL Bochum	1–0	1. FC Köln	Bochum
13:30	Sukuta-Pasu 65'			Stadium: rewirpowerSTADION; Attendance: 27,555; Referee: Manuel Gräfe (Berlin)

22 November 2013 15	Arminia Bielefeld	0–2	VfL Bochum	Bielefeld
18:30			Ilsø 12'; Tasaka 54'	Stadium: Alm; Attendance: 16,731; Referee: Martin Petersen (Stuttgart)

1 December 2013 16	VfL Bochum	1–2	TSV 1860 Munich	Bochum
13:30	Tasaka 35'		Stahl 10'; Adlung 61'	Stadium: rewirpowerSTADION; Attendance: 17,479; Referee: Daniel Siebert (Berlin)

6 December 2013 17	Karlsruher SC	0–0	VfL Bochum	Karlsruhe
18:30				Stadium: Wildparkstadion; Attendance: 13,278; Referee: Tobias Christ (Münchweiler)

14 December 2013 18	VfL Bochum	0–4	1. FC Union Berlin	Bochum
13:00			Quiring 13', 36'; Terodde 47'; Köhler 52'	Stadium: rewirpowerSTADION; Attendance: 13,117; Referee: Günter Perl (Pullach)

20 December 2013 19	Dynamo Dresden	0–0	VfL Bochum	Dresden
18:30				Stadium: Glücksgas Stadium; Attendance: 27,872; Referee: Christian Dingert (Lebecksmühle)

7 February 2014 20	VfL Bochum	1–2	FSV Frankfurt	Bochum
18:30	Aydin 67'		Rukavytsya 52'; Wooten 70'	Stadium: rewirpowerSTADION; Attendance: 12,811; Referee: Christian Bandurski (Oberhausen)

15 February 2014 21	FC St. Pauli	0–1	VfL Bochum	Hamburg
13:00			Eyjólfsson 12'	Stadium: Millerntor-Stadion; Attendance: 29,063; Referee: Daniel Siebert (Berlin)

23 February 2014 22	VfL Bochum	0–0	Fortuna Düsseldorf	Bochum
13:30				Stadium: rewirpowerSTADION; Attendance: 23,145; Referee: Deniz Aytekin (Oberasbach)

28 February 2014 23	SC Paderborn 07	4–1	VfL Bochum	Paderborn
18:30	Meha 48', 69'; Vrančić 71'; Sağlık 80' (pen.)		Latza 40'	Stadium: Benteler Arena; Attendance: 12,135; Referee: Robert Kampka (Mainz)

10 March 2014 24	VfL Bochum	0–2	SpVgg Greuther Fürth	Bochum
20:15			Brosinski 41'; Azemi 90+1'	Stadium: rewirpowerSTADION; Attendance: 10,833; Referee: Tobias Stieler (Hamburg)

14 March 2014 25	VfR Aalen	0–2	VfL Bochum	Aalen
18:30			Aydın 23'; Butscher 90+2'	Stadium: Scholz Arena; Attendance: 5,911; Referee: Christian Leicher (Landshut)

21 March 2014 26	VfL Bochum	0–1	SV Sandhausen	Bochum
18:30			Stiefler 7'	Stadium: rewirpowerSTADION; Attendance: 11,332; Referee: Martin Petersen (Stuttgart)

25 March 2014 27	FC Ingolstadt 04	3–0	VfL Bochum	Ingolstadt
17:30	Hofmann 28', 79'; Lappe 74'			Stadium: Audi Sportpark; Attendance: 3,708; Referee: Norbert Grudzinski (Hamburg)

29 March 2014 28	VfL Bochum	1–0	FC Erzgebirge Aue	Bochum
13:00	Sukuta-Pasu 50'			Stadium: rewirpowerSTADION; Attendance: 10,225; Referee: Tobias Christ (Münchweiler)

6 April 2014 29	1. FC Kaiserslautern	1–1	VfL Bochum	Kaiserslautern
13:30	Idrissou 45'		Sukuta-Pasu 43'	Stadium: Fritz-Walter-Stadion; Attendance: 26,916; Referee: Christian Dietz (Kronach)

13 April 2014 30	VfL Bochum	2–1	FC Energie Cottbus	Bochum
13:30	Kreyer 61'; Sukuta-Pasu 74' (pen.)		Takyi 28'	Stadium: rewirpowerSTADION; Attendance: 11,779; Referee: Bibiana Steinhaus (Hannover)

21 April 2014 31	1. FC Köln	3–1	VfL Bochum	Cologne
20:15	Risse 50'; Helmes 64'; Ujah 81'		Matuschyk 42' (o.g.)	Stadium: RheinEnergieStadion; Attendance: 49,100; Referee: Guido Winkmann (Kerken)

25 April 2014 32	VfL Bochum	1–4	Arminia Bielefeld	Bochum
18:30	Butscher 72'		Sahar 14', 31'; Klos 39'; Müller 86'	Stadium: rewirpowerSTADION; Attendance: 19,166; Referee: Benjamin Cortus (Röthenbach)

4 May 2014 33	TSV 1860 Munich	2–0	VfL Bochum	Munich
15:30	Osako 31'; Lauth 90+1'			Stadium: Allianz Arena; Attendance: 20,600; Referee: René Rohde (Rostock)

11 May 2014 34	VfL Bochum	1–0	Karlsruher SC	Bochum
15:30	Zahirović 62'			Stadium: rewirpowerSTADION; Attendance: 14,282; Referee: Günter Perl (Pullach)

=== DFB-Pokal ===
3 August 2013 Round 1	Bahlinger SC	1–3	VfL Bochum	Bahlingen
15:30	Göppert 90+1'		Ćwielong 17', 31'; Latza 63'	Stadium: Kaiserstuhlstadion; Attendance: 3,780; Referee: Malte Dittrich (Bremen)

25 September 2013 Round 2	Eintracht Frankfurt	2–0	VfL Bochum	Frankfurt am Main
19:00	Inui 24'; Aigner 25'			Stadium: Commerzbank-Arena; Attendance: 28,100; Referee: Guido Winkmann (Kerken)

== Squad ==
=== Squad and statistics ===
==== Squad, appearances and goals scored ====
As of 12 May 2014

No.	Pos	Nat	Player	Total		2. Bundesliga		DFB-Pokal	
No.	Pos	Nat	Player	Apps	Goals	Apps	Goals	Apps	Goals
1	GK	(Germany) GER	Andreas Luthe (captain)	34	0	32	0	2	0
2	DF	(Germany) GER	Jan Gyamerah	2	0	2	0	0	0
3	DF	(Germany) GER	Fabian Holthaus	5	0	4	0	1	0
4	DF	(Germany) GER	Marcel Maltritz	35	2	33	2	2	0
5	DF	(Germany) GER	Heiko Butscher	10	3	10	3	0	0
6	DF	(Germany) GER	Lukas Sinkiewicz	4	0	4	0	0	0
7	MF	(Germany) GER	Paul Freier	29	0	27	0	2	0
8	MF	(Germany) GER	Christian Tiffert	25	0	24	0	1	0
9	FW	(Germany) GER	Richard Sukuta-Pasu	34	6	32	6	2	0
10	MF	(Japan) JPN	Yusuke Tasaka	33	3	31	3	2	0
11	DF	(Germany) GER	Felix Bastians	13	0	13	0	0	0
12	FW	(Denmark) DEN	Ken Ilsø (from 31 July 2013 until 13 February 2014)	17	2	16	2	1	0
14	MF	(Bosnia and Herzegovina) BIH	Adnan Zahirović (since 31 July 2013)	14	1	13	1	1	0
15	DF	(Iceland) ISL	Hólmar Örn Eyjólfsson	19	1	18	1	1	0
17	FW	(France) FRA	Smail Morabit (until 16 August 2013)	0	0	0	0	0	0
18	MF	(Germany) GER	Danny Latza	36	3	34	2	2	1
19	DF	(Germany) GER	Patrick Fabian	33	2	31	2	2	0
20	MF	(Poland) POL	Piotr Ćwielong	32	3	30	1	2	2
21	FW	(Germany) GER	Joel Reinholz	0	0	0	0	0	0
22	FW	(Germany) GER	Mirkan Aydın	31	4	29	4	2	0
23	MF	(Germany) GER	Florian Jungwirth	30	1	29	1	1	0
24	DF	(Germany) GER	Carsten Rothenbach	0	0	0	0	0	0
25	MF	(Turkey) TUR	Onur Bulut	11	0	10	0	1	0
26	DF	(Germany) GER	Jonas Acquistapace	27	0	25	0	2	0
27	FW	(Germany) GER	Selim Gündüz	0	0	0	0	0	0
28	FW	(Germany) GER	Sven Kreyer (since 9 August 2013)	12	1	11	1	1	0
29	FW	(Germany) GER	Daniel Engelbrecht (until 18 July 2013)	0	0	0	0	0	0
29	FW	(Croatia) CRO	Mario Jelavić (from 30 July 2013 until 31 January 2014)	0	0	0	0	0	0
30	DF	(Germany) GER	Mounir Chaftar (until 31 January 2014)	1	0	1	0	0	0
30	FW	(Germany) GER	Moritz Göttel (since 21 March 2014)	0	0	0	0	0	0
31	GK	(Germany) GER	Michael Esser	4	0	4	0	0	0
32	GK	(Germany) GER	Felix Dornebusch	0	0	0	0	0	0
34	GK	(Germany) GER	Jonas Ermes	0	0	0	0	0	0
35	GK	(Germany) GER	Sebastian Brune (since 6 October 2013)	0	0	0	0	0	0
36	DF	(Germany) GER	Daniel Heber (since 6 January 2014)	0	0	0	0	0	0
37	DF	(Germany) GER	Lukas Klostermann (since 10 March 2014)	9	0	9	0	0	0
39	MF	(Norway) NOR	Henrik Gulden (since 16 November 2013)	2	0	2	0	0	0
41	MF	(Germany) GER	Christian Silaj (since 10 September 2013)	0	0	0	0	0	0
42	MF	(Germany) GER	Sven Köhler (since 10 September 2013)	0	0	0	0	0	0
43	DF	(Germany) GER	Rico Weiler (since 10 September 2013)	0	0	0	0	0	0
44	DF	(Germany) GER	Phil Spillmann (since 10 September 2013)	0	0	0	0	0	0
45	MF	(Germany) GER	Julian Stock (since 10 September 2013)	0	0	0	0	0	0

=== Transfers ===
==== Summer ====
As of 26 September 2013

In:

No.	Pos.	Nation	Player
2	DF	GER	Jan Gyamerah (from VfL Bochum youth)
3	DF	GER	Fabian Holthaus (from VfL Bochum youth)
5	DF	GER	Heiko Butscher (from Eintracht Frankfurt)
8	MF	GER	Christian Tiffert (free agent)
9	FW	GER	Richard Sukuta-Pasu (on loan from 1. FC Kaiserslautern, previously on loan at SK Sturm Graz)
11	DF	GER	Felix Bastians (on loan from Hertha BSC)
12	FW	DEN	Ken Ilsø (from Fortuna Düsseldorf)
14	MF	BIH	Adnan Zahirović (from PFC Spartak Nalchik, previously on loan at FC Dinamo Minsk)
17	FW	FRA	Smail Morabit (from FC Rot-Weiß Erfurt)
18	MF	GER	Danny Latza (from SV Darmstadt 98)
20	MF	POL	Piotr Ćwielong (from Śląsk Wrocław)
21	FW	GER	Joel Reinholz (from VfL Bochum youth)
23	MF	GER	Florian Jungwirth (from Dynamo Dresden)
28	FW	GER	Sven Kreyer (from VfL Bochum II)
29	FW	CRO	Mario Jelavić (from NK Slaven Belupo)
32	GK	GER	Felix Dornebusch (from VfL Bochum II)
34	GK	GER	Jonas Ermes (from VfL Bochum II)

Out:

No.	Pos.	Nation	Player
5	MF	GER	Christoph Dabrowski (retired)
9	FW	GEO	Nikoloz Gelashvili (to Qarabağ FK)
10	MF	GEO	Alexander Iashvili (to Inter Baku PIK)
11	FW	SLO	Zlatko Dedič (to Dynamo Dresden)
12	MF	COL	Michael Javier Ortega (loan return to Bayer 04 Leverkusen)
13	MF	GER	Marc Rzatkowski (to FC St. Pauli)
14	MF	GER	Sören Bertram (on loan to Hallescher FC)
16	MF	GER	Michael Delura (released)
17	DF	GER	Florian Brügmann (to Hallescher FC)
18	MF	GER	Leon Goretzka (to FC Schalke 04)
20	MF	GER	Faton Toski (released)
21	FW	GER	Kevin Scheidhauer (loan return to VfL Wolfsburg)
23	MF	GER	Christoph Kramer (loan return to Bayer 04 Leverkusen)
29	GK	GER	Philipp Heerwagen (to FC St. Pauli)
30	DF	DEN	Michael Lumb (to FC Vestsjælland)
35	DF	GER	Jannik Stevens (to Alemannia Aachen)
39	GK	POR	Daniel Heuer Fernandes (to VfL Osnabrück)
--	FW	GER	Daniel Engelbrecht (to Stuttgarter Kickers, previously on loan)
--	FW	FRA	Smail Morabit (on loan to 1. FC Heidenheim)

==== Winter ====
As of 28 February 2014

In:

No.	Pos.	Nation	Player

Out:

No.	Pos.	Nation	Player
12	FW	DEN	Ken Ilsø (to Guangzhou R&F)
29	FW	CRO	Mario Jelavić (released)
30	DF	GER	Mounir Chaftar (to 1. FC Saarbrücken)
