= 2012–13 VfL Bochum season =

VfL Bochum
2012–13 season
- Chairman: Ernst-Otto Stüber (until 10 September 2012); Hans-Peter Villis (since 10 September 2012)
- Head coach: Andreas Bergmann (until 28 October 2012); Karsten Neitzel (ad interim, until 8 April 2013); Peter Neururer (since 8 April 2013)
- Stadium: rewirpowerSTADION
- 2. Bundesliga: 14th
- DFB-Pokal: Quarterfinals
- Top goalscorer: League: Zlatko Dedič (8); All: Zlatko Dedič (11)
- Highest home attendance: 28,400 (vs. 1. FC Köln, 4 May 2013)
- Lowest home attendance: 8,365 (vs. FSV Frankfurt, 27 November 2012)
- Average home league attendance: 14,516
Home colours	Away colours	Third colours

The 2012–13 VfL Bochum season is the 75th season in club history. In 2012–13 the club plays in the 2. Bundesliga, the second tier of German football. It is the clubs third consecutive season in this league, having played at this level since 2010–11, after it was relegated from the Bundesliga in 2010.

== Review and events ==
On 28 October 2012, Andreas Bergmann was sacked and replaced by Karsten Neitzel.

Marcel Maltritz set a new record for the number of 2. Bundesliga appearances for the club. After Maltritz tied Dariusz Wosz's old record of 107 appearances on 1 December 2012 against 1. FC Union Berlin, he broke it on 16 December 2012 with his appearance against SC Paderborn 07.

During the winter break, the club mourned the death of long-time club official Werner Altegoer, who died on 9 January 2013.

On 8 April 2013, after a string of bad results and the danger of relegation, Peter Neururer replaced Neitzel as the manager of VfL Bochum.

== Matches ==
=== Legend ===
Win Draw Loss

=== Friendly matches ===
19 June 2012	SC Willingen	0–10	VfL Bochum	Willingen
18:30			Dabrowski 5', 18', 37', 61'; Iashvili 21', 48', 81'; Goretzka 22'; Gelashvili 35'; Freier 43'	Stadium: Sportplatz Schwalefeld; Attendance: 250; Referee: Bauschmann (Korbach)

21 June 2012	Hochsauerlandkreis-Selection	0–4	VfL Bochum	Brilon
18:00			Engelbrecht 55', 90'; Bertram 65', 80'	Stadium: Stadion an der Jakobuslinde; Attendance: 680

3 July 2012	VfB Hüls	2–0	VfL Bochum	Marl
19:00	Kyei 53'; Pavlovic 58'			Stadium: Stadion am Badeweiher; Attendance: 700

7 July 2012	Rot-Weiß Oberhausen	0–3	VfL Bochum	Oberhausen
14:30			Fejzulahi 30'; Iashvili 43'; Engelbrecht 74'	Stadium: Niederrheinstadion; Attendance: 1,500; Referee: Markus Wollenweber

11 July 2012	Viktoria Köln	1–3	VfL Bochum	Cologne
18:00	Schultens 29'		Dedič 52', 66'; Scheidhauer 64'	Stadium: Sportpark Höhenberg; Attendance: 350

14 July 2012	VfL Osnabrück	3–1	VfL Bochum	Osnabrück
15:30	Staffeldt 21'; Nagy 53'; Glockner 77'		Dedič 36'	Stadium: Osnatel-Arena; Attendance: 2,500; Referee: Arne Aarnink (Nordhorn)

25 July 2012	TSV Havelse	2–1	VfL Bochum	Garbsen
18:30	Tayar 6'; Beismann 44'		Maltritz 32'	Stadium: Wilhelm-Langrehr-Stadion; Attendance: 300; Referee: Harm Osmers (Hannover)

28 July 2012	VfL Bochum	1–4	Borussia Mönchengladbach	Bochum
17:30	Sinkiewicz 14'		Arango 6', 39', 43'; Mlapa 67'	Stadium: rewirpowerSTADION; Attendance: 10,200; Referee: Thorsten Kinhöfer (Herne)

4 September 2012	BV Hiltrop	0–5	VfL Bochum	Bochum
19:00			Scheidhauer 18'; Tasaka 21'; Engelbrecht 53'; Gelashvili 61', 69'	Stadium: Hillerberg; Attendance: 800; Referee: Julian Hahn (Witten)

6 September 2012	SV Bommern	0–19	VfL Bochum	Witten
18:30			Bertram 9'; Tasaka 13', 30'; Maltritz 16'; Engelbrecht 23', 36', 39', 44'; Goretzka 50', 85'; Reinholz 54', 55', 63', 81', 86'; Scheidhauer 73'; Gündüz 76'; Weiler 78'; Rzatkowski 80'	Stadium: Wullenstadion; Attendance: 600; Referee: Björn Backhaus

11 October 2012	SG Wattenscheid 09	0–1	VfL Bochum	Bochum
18:30			Bertram 85'	Stadium: Lohrheidestadion; Attendance: 1,381; Referee: Thomas Altgeld

6 January 2013	VfL Bochum	11–0	Concordia Wiemelhausen	Bochum
15:00	Freier 15'; Dedič 21', 32'; Kramer 24'; Ortega 26'; Bertram 30'; Bulut 67'; Scheidhauer 63', 89'; Toski 84'; Gündüz 86'			Stadium: Sportplatz am rewirpowerSTADION; Attendance: 600; Referee: Jörn Schäfer

9 January 2013	VfL Bochum	10–0	CSV Sportfreunde Bochum-Linden	Bochum
18:30	Bulut 1'; Scheidhauer 10', 11', 53'; Sinkiewicz 16'; Gündüz 26'; Kramer 40'; Aydın 60'; Bertram 64'; Ortega 90'			Stadium: Sportplatz am rewirpowerSTADION; Attendance: 350; Referee: Felix Schmitz

13 January 2013	VfL Bochum	2–0	FC Aktobe	Belek
14:30 CET	Eyjólfsson 25'; Ortega 31'			Stadium: Sportplatz am Hotel Cornelia Diamond

16 January 2013	VfL Bochum	0–4	1. FC Köln	Belek
14:30 CET			Maroh 10', 57'; Ujah 32'; Clemens 50'	Stadium: Sportplatz am Hotel Cornelia Diamond; Attendance: 180

20 January 2013	VfL Bochum	1–0	Flota Świnoujście	Bochum
13:30	Rzatkowski 38'			Stadium: Sportplatz am rewirpowerSTADION; Attendance: 300; Referee: Christian Bandurski

26 January 2013	VfL Bochum	1–2	SC Paderborn 07	Bochum
13:00	Iashvili 76'		Meha 45'; Feisthammel 48'	Stadium: rewirpowerSTADION; Attendance: Sören Storks (Ramsdorf); Referee: 500

=== 2. Bundesliga ===
4 August 2012 1	VfL Bochum	2–1	Dynamo Dresden	Bochum
15:30	Goretzka 52'; Freier 85'		Poté 28'	Stadium: rewirpowerSTADION; Attendance: 16,191; Referee: Robert Hartmann (Wangen)

11 August 2012 2	SC Paderborn 07	4–0	VfL Bochum	Paderborn
13:00	Vrančić 24', 50'; Meha 40'; Yilmaz 82'			Stadium: Energieteam Arena; Attendance: 10,763; Referee: Florian Meyer (Burgdorf)

26 August 2012 3	VfL Bochum	0–1	VfR Aalen	Bochum
13:30			Kampl 85'	Stadium: rewirpowerSTADION; Attendance: 11,251; Referee: Thorsten Schriever (Dorum)

2 September 2012 4	SSV Jahn Regensburg	0–1	VfL Bochum	Regensburg
13:30			Scheidhauer 79'	Stadium: Jahnstadion; Attendance: 5,912; Referee: Marcel Unger (Halle)

14 September 2012 5	VfL Bochum	0–0	TSV 1860 Munich	Bochum
18:00				Stadium: rewirpowerSTADION; Attendance: 13,098; Referee: Bastian Dankert (Rostock)

23 September 2012 6	MSV Duisburg	0–0	VfL Bochum	Duisburg
13:30				Stadium: Schauinsland-Reisen-Arena; Attendance: 15,017; Referee: Daniel Siebert (Berlin)

27 September 2012 7	VfL Bochum	1–2	1. FC Kaiserslautern	Bochum
20:15	Tasaka 84'		Fortounis 36'; Idrissou 65'	Stadium: rewirpowerSTADION; Attendance: 13,212; Referee: Harm Osmers (Hannover)

30 September 2012 8	VfL Bochum	1–1	FC Ingolstadt 04	Bochum
13:30	Brügmann 85'		Caiuby 9'	Stadium: rewirpowerSTADION; Attendance: 12,017; Referee: Markus Wingenbach (Diez)

6 October 2012 9	Eintracht Braunschweig	3–0	VfL Bochum	Braunschweig
13:00	Bičakčić 21'; Ademi 63'; Kruppke 85'			Stadium: Eintracht-Stadion; Attendance: 19,875; Referee: Wolfgang Stark (Ergolding)

19 October 2012 10	VfL Bochum	0–2	Hertha BSC	Bochum
18:00			Kluge 46'; Ndjeng 79'	Stadium: rewirpowerSTADION; Attendance: 13,985; Referee: Florian Meyer (Burgdorf)

27 October 2012 11	FC Erzgebirge Aue	6–1	VfL Bochum	Aue
13:00	Müller 7'; König 9', 49'; Hochscheidt 10', 46'; Paulus 59' (pen.)		Paulus 90' (o.g.)	Stadium: Erzgebirgsstadion; Attendance: 6,500; Referee: Norbert Grudzinski (Hamburg)

4 November 2012 12	VfL Bochum	2–2	FC Energie Cottbus	Bochum
13:30	Sinkiewicz 73'; Dedič 89'		Sanogo 5', 52'	Stadium: rewirpowerSTADION; Attendance: 9,571; Referee: Daniel Siebert (Berlin)

12 November 2012 13	FC St. Pauli	1–1	VfL Bochum	Hamburg
20:15	Ginczek 16'		Dabrowski 55'	Stadium: Millerntor-Stadion; Attendance: 20,788; Referee: Christian Dingert (Thallichtenberg)

18 November 2012 14	VfL Bochum	5–2	SV Sandhausen	Bochum
13:30	Dedič 20', 44'; Maltritz 40'; Rzatkowski 51', 71'		Löning 5', 23'	Stadium: rewirpowerSTADION; Attendance: 9,795; Referee: Benjamin Brand (Gerolzhofen)

23 November 2012 15	1. FC Köln	3–1	VfL Bochum	Cologne
18:00	Ujah 11', 84'; McKenna 35'		Gelashvili 90'	Stadium: RheinEnergieStadion; Attendance: 40,000; Referee: Marco Fritz (Korb)

27 November 2012 16	VfL Bochum	1–3	FSV Frankfurt	Bochum
17:30	Tasaka 87'		Teixeira 21'; Kapllani 54'; Verhoek 60'	Stadium: rewirpowerSTADION; Attendance: 8,365; Referee: Frank Willenborg (Osnabrück)

1 December 2012 17	1. FC Union Berlin	2–1	VfL Bochum	Berlin
13:00	Karl 3'; Nemec 51'		Dedič 23'	Stadium: Stadion An der Alten Försterei; Attendance: 16,074; Referee: Christian Dietz (Kronach)

8 December 2012 18	Dynamo Dresden	0–3	VfL Bochum	Dresden
13:00			Aydın 17'; Dabrowski 25'; Kramer 88'	Stadium: Glücksgas Stadium; Attendance: 20,660; Referee: Manuel Gräfe (Berlin)

16 December 2012 19	VfL Bochum	4–0	SC Paderborn 07	Bochum
13:30	Aydın 17', 72'; Goretzka 40'; Scheidhauer 80'			Stadium: rewirpowerSTADION; Attendance: 10,250; Referee: Sascha Stegemann (Niederkassel)

1 February 2013 20	VfR Aalen	2–2	VfL Bochum	Aalen
18:00	Cidimar 47'; Lechleiter 71'		Rzatkowski 25'; Goretzka 51'	Stadium: Scholz-Arena; Attendance: 5,211; Referee: Harm Osmers (Hannover)

10 February 2013 21	VfL Bochum	0–2	SSV Jahn Regensburg	Bochum
13:30			Djuricin 47', 87'	Stadium: rewirpowerSTADION; Attendance: 10,685; Referee: Tobias Christ (Münchweiler)

15 February 2013 22	TSV 1860 Munich	0–1	VfL Bochum	Munich
18:00			Scheidhauer 10'	Stadium: Allianz Arena; Attendance: 14,100; Referee: Markus Wingenbach (Diez)

22 February 2013 23	VfL Bochum	2–2	MSV Duisburg	Bochum
18:00	Sinkiewicz 51'; Kramer 56'		Exslager 37'; Perthel 89'	Stadium: rewirpowerSTADION; Attendance: 14,127; Referee: Felix Brych (Munich)

2 March 2013 24	1. FC Kaiserslautern	0–0	VfL Bochum	Kaiserslautern
13:00				Stadium: Fritz-Walter-Stadion; Attendance: 26,896; Referee: Günter Perl (Pullach)

10 March 2013 25	FC Ingolstadt 04	2–1	VfL Bochum	Ingolstadt
13:30	Groß 56'; Caiuby 64'		Goretzka 61'	Stadium: Audi Sportpark; Attendance: 6,101; Referee: Christian Bandurski (Oberhausen)

16 March 2013 26	VfL Bochum	0–1	Eintracht Braunschweig	Bochum
13:00			Kumbela 85'	Stadium: rewirpowerSTADION; Attendance: 12,371; Referee: Sascha Stegemann (Niederkassel)

30 March 2013 27	Hertha BSC	2–0	VfL Bochum	Berlin
13:00	Ronny 4'; Schulz 46'			Stadium: Olympic Stadium; Attendance: 34,802; Referee: Tobias Stieler (Obertshausen)

5 April 2013 28	VfL Bochum	0–3	FC Erzgebirge Aue	Bochum
18:00			Klingbeil 8'; Nickenig 29'; Müller 37'	Stadium: rewirpowerSTADION; Attendance: Robert Hartmann (Wangen); Referee: 13,133

14 April 2013 29	FC Energie Cottbus	0–2	VfL Bochum	Cottbus
13:30			Banović 49' (o.g.); Dedič 90+2'	Stadium: Stadion der Freundschaft; Attendance: 8,555; Referee: Benjamin Cortus (Röthenbach)

19 April 2013 30	VfL Bochum	3–0	FC St. Pauli	Bochum
18:00	Dedič 25' (pen.), 37'; Tasaka 70'			Stadium: rewirpowerSTADION; Attendance: 26,072; Referee: Markus Schmidt (Stuttgart)

26 April 2013 31	SV Sandhausen	0–1	VfL Bochum	Sandhausen
18:00			Maltritz 41'	Stadium: Hardtwaldstadion; Attendance: 4,400; Referee: Tobias Christ (Münchweiler)

4 May 2013 32	VfL Bochum	2–1	1. FC Köln	Bochum
13:00	Dedič 65'; Maltritz 79'		Chihi 41'	Stadium: rewirpowerSTADION; Attendance: 28,400; Referee: Manuel Gräfe (Berlin)

12 May 2013 33	FSV Frankfurt	2–1	VfL Bochum	Frankfurt am Main
13:30	Gaus 22'; Verhoek 68'		Toski 48'	Stadium: Volksbank Stadion; Attendance: 7,572; Referee: Jochen Drees (Münster)

19 May 2013 34	VfL Bochum	1–2	1. FC Union Berlin	Bochum
13:30	Kramer 80'		Özbek 49'; Skrzybski 55'	Stadium: rewirpowerSTADION; Attendance: 24,244; Referee: Tobias Stieler (Obertshausen)

=== DFB-Pokal ===
18 August 2012 Round 1	1. FC Heidenheim	0–2	VfL Bochum	Heidenheim an der Brenz
18:00			Dedič 5', 41'	Stadium: Voith-Arena; Attendance: 7,500; Referee: Tobias Christ (Münchweiler)

30 October 2012 Round 2	TSV Havelse	1–3	VfL Bochum	Garbsen
20:30	Posipal 17'		Iashvili 30'; Rzatkowski 73'; Ortega 90+4'	Stadium: Wilhelm-Langrehr-Stadion; Attendance: 3,371; Referee: Christian Bandurski (Oberhausen)

19 December 2012 Round 3	VfL Bochum	3–0	TSV 1860 Munich	Bochum
19:00	Dedič 30'; Maltritz 75', 78'			Stadium: rewirpowerSTADION; Attendance: 20,206; Referee: Tobias Welz (Wiesbaden)

27 February 2013 Quarterfinals	VfB Stuttgart	2–0	VfL Bochum	Stuttgart
19:00	Gentner 18'; Ibišević 81'			Stadium: Mercedes-Benz Arena; Attendance: 20,200; Referee: Felix Zwayer (Berlin)

== Squad ==
=== Squad and statistics ===
==== Squad, appearances and goals scored ====
As of 20 May 2013

No.	Pos	Nat	Player	Total		2. Bundesliga		DFB-Pokal	
No.	Pos	Nat	Player	Apps	Goals	Apps	Goals	Apps	Goals
1	GK	(Germany) GER	Andreas Luthe (captain)	27	0	25	0	2	0
2	DF	(Germany) GER	Mounir Chaftar	22	0	21	0	1	0
3	DF	(Germany) GER	Patrick Fabian	0	0	0	0	0	0
4	DF	(Germany) GER	Marcel Maltritz (vice-captain)	34	5	31	3	3	2
5	MF	(Germany) GER	Christoph Dabrowski (vice-captain)	16	2	14	2	2	0
6	DF	(Germany) GER	Lukas Sinkiewicz (vice-captain)	26	2	22	2	4	0
7	MF	(Germany) GER	Paul Freier	23	1	21	1	2	0
8	MF	(Japan) JPN	Yusuke Tasaka	30	3	28	3	2	0
9	FW	(Georgia (country)) GEO	Nikoloz Gelashvili	14	1	12	1	2	0
10	FW	(Georgia (country)) GEO	Alexander Iashvili	32	1	28	0	4	1
11	FW	(Slovenia) SLO	Zlatko Dedič	32	11	30	8	2	3
12	MF	(Colombia) COL	Michael Javier Ortega	11	1	9	0	2	1
13	MF	(Germany) GER	Marc Rzatkowski	29	4	25	3	4	1
14	MF	(Germany) GER	Sören Bertram	3	0	3	0	0	0
15	DF	(Iceland) ISL	Hólmar Örn Eyjólfsson	19	0	16	0	3	0
16	MF	(Germany) GER	Michael Delura	15	0	14	0	1	0
17	DF	(Germany) GER	Florian Brügmann	8	1	6	1	2	0
18	MF	(Germany) GER	Leon Goretzka	36	4	32	4	4	0
20	MF	(Germany) GER	Faton Toski	9	1	9	1	0	0
21	FW	(Germany) GER	Kevin Scheidhauer	21	3	19	3	2	0
22	FW	(Germany) GER	Mirkan Aydın	11	3	10	3	1	0
23	MF	(Germany) GER	Christoph Kramer	32	3	29	3	3	0
24	DF	(Germany) GER	Carsten Rothenbach	31	0	27	0	4	0
25	MF	(Turkey) TUR	Onur Bulut	0	0	0	0	0	0
26	DF	(Germany) GER	Jonas Acquistapace	19	0	17	0	2	0
27	FW	(Germany) GER	Selim Gündüz	0	0	0	0	0	0
29	GK	(Germany) GER	Philipp Heerwagen	8	0	7	0	1	0
30	FW	(Germany) GER	Daniel Engelbrecht (until 3 January 2013)	2	0	1	0	1	0
30	DF	(Denmark) DEN	Michael Lumb (since 25 January 2013)	14	0	13	0	1	0
31	GK	(Germany) GER	Michael Esser	4	0	3	0	1	0
35	DF	(Germany) GER	Jannik Stevens (since 9 March 2013)	0	0	0	0	0	0
39	GK	(Portugal) POR	Daniel Heuer Fernandes (since 30 October 2012)	0	0	0	0	0	0
40	DF	(Germany) GER	Jan Gyamerah (since 9 March 2013)	0	0	0	0	0	0
41	DF	(Germany) GER	Fabian Holthaus (since 17 May 2013)	1	0	1	0	0	0

==== Minutes played ====
As of 20 May 2013

No.	Nat	Pos	Player	Total	2. Bundesliga	DFB-Pokal
1	(Germany)	GK	Andreas Luthe	2353	2173	180
2	(Germany)	DF	Mounir Chaftar	1757	1667	90
3	(Germany)	DF	Patrick Fabian	0	0	0
4	(Germany)	DF	Marcel Maltritz	3060	2790	270
5	(Germany)	MF	Christoph Dabrowski	799	709	90
6	(Germany)	DF	Lukas Sinkiewicz	2298	1960	338
7	(Germany)	MF	Paul Freier	1374	1264	110
8	(Japan)	MF	Yusuke Tasaka	2408	2263	145
9	(Georgia (country))	FW	Nikoloz Gelashvili	299	279	20
10	(Georgia (country))	FW	Alexander Iashvili	1944	1668	276
11	(Slovenia)	FW	Zlatko Dedič	2232	2075	157
12	(Colombia)	MF	Michael Javier Ortega	332	303	29
13	(Germany)	MF	Marc Rzatkowski	2198	1864	334
14	(Germany)	MF	Sören Bertram	25	25	0
15	(Iceland)	DF	Hólmar Örn Eyjólfsson	1169	1020	149
16	(Germany)	MF	Michael Delura	484	462	22
17	(Germany)	DF	Florian Brügmann	617	437	180
18	(Germany)	MF	Leon Goretzka	3132	2772	360
20	(Germany)	MF	Faton Toski	407	407	0
21	(Germany)	FW	Kevin Scheidhauer	1023	930	93
22	(Germany)	FW	Mirkan Aydın	688	614	74
23	(Germany)	MF	Christoph Kramer	2641	2417	224
24	(Germany)	DF	Carsten Rothenbach	2608	2248	360
25	(Turkey)	MF	Onur Bulut	0	0	0
26	(Germany)	DF	Jonas Acquistapace	1074	975	99
27	(Germany)	FW	Selim Gündüz	0	0	0
29	(Germany)	GK	Philipp Heerwagen	707	617	90
30	(Germany)	FW	Daniel Engelbrecht	149	59	90
30	(Denmark)	DF	Michael Lumb	1190	1100	90
31	(Germany)	GK	Michael Esser	360	270	90
35	(Germany)	DF	Jannik Stevens	0	0	0
39	(Portugal)	GK	Daniel Heuer Fernandes	0	0	0
40	(Germany)	DF	Jan Gyamerah	0	0	0
41	(Germany)	DF	Fabian Holthaus	15	15	0

==== Bookings ====
As of 20 May 2013

Players				Total			2. Bundesliga			DFB-Pokal		
No.	Nat	Pos	Name	Yellow card	(yellow card) (red card)	Red card	Yellow card	(yellow card) (red card)	Red card	Yellow card	(yellow card) (red card)	Red card
1	(Germany)	GK	Andreas Luthe	1	0	0	1	0	0	0	0	0
2	(Germany)	DF	Mounir Chaftar	3	0	0	3	0	0	0	0	0
3	(Germany)	DF	Patrick Fabian	0	0	0	0	0	0	0	0	0
4	(Germany)	DF	Marcel Maltritz	8	0	0	7	0	0	1	0	0
5	(Germany)	MF	Christoph Dabrowski	3	0	1	3	0	1	0	0	0
6	(Germany)	DF	Lukas Sinkiewicz	9	0	0	9	0	0	0	0	0
7	(Germany)	MF	Paul Freier	2	0	0	2	0	0	0	0	0
8	(Japan)	MF	Yusuke Tasaka	6	0	0	5	0	0	0	0	0
9	(Georgia (country))	FW	Nikoloz Gelashvili	2	0	0	1	0	0	0	0	0
10	(Georgia (country))	FW	Alexander Iashvili	6	0	0	4	0	0	2	0	0
11	(Slovenia)	FW	Zlatko Dedič	1	0	0	1	0	0	0	0	0
12	(Colombia)	MF	Michael Javier Ortega	1	0	0	1	0	0	0	0	0
13	(Germany)	MF	Marc Rzatkowski	5	0	0	4	0	0	1	0	0
14	(Germany)	MF	Sören Bertram	0	0	0	0	0	0	0	0	0
15	(Iceland)	DF	Hólmar Örn Eyjólfsson	2	0	2	2	0	2	0	0	0
16	(Germany)	MF	Michael Delura	2	0	0	2	0	0	0	0	0
17	(Germany)	DF	Florian Brügmann	1	0	0	1	0	0	0	0	0
18	(Germany)	MF	Leon Goretzka	1	0	0	1	0	0	0	0	0
20	(Germany)	MF	Faton Toski	0	0	0	0	0	0	0	0	0
21	(Germany)	FW	Kevin Scheidhauer	4	0	0	4	0	0	0	0	0
22	(Germany)	FW	Mirkan Aydın	0	0	0	0	0	0	0	0	0
23	(Germany)	MF	Christoph Kramer	11	1	0	7	0	0	3	1	0
24	(Germany)	DF	Carsten Rothenbach	4	0	0	4	0	0	0	0	0
25	(Turkey)	MF	Onur Bulut	0	0	0	0	0	0	0	0	0
26	(Germany)	DF	Jonas Acquistapace	1	0	0	1	0	0	0	0	0
27	(Germany)	FW	Selim Gündüz	0	0	0	0	0	0	0	0	0
29	(Germany)	GK	Philipp Heerwagen	0	0	0	0	0	0	0	0	0
30	(Germany)	FW	Daniel Engelbrecht	1	0	0	0	0	0	1	0	0
30	(Denmark)	DF	Michael Lumb	1	0	0	1	0	0	0	0	0
31	(Germany)	GK	Michael Esser	1	0	0	1	0	0	0	0	0
35	(Germany)	DF	Jannik Stevens	0	0	0	0	0	0	0	0	0
39	(Portugal)	GK	Daniel Heuer Fernandes	0	0	0	0	0	0	0	0	0
40	(Germany)	DF	Jan Gyamerah	0	0	0	0	0	0	0	0	0
41	(Germany)	DF	Fabian Holthaus	0	0	0	0	0	0	0	0	0
Totals				73	1	3	65	0	3	8	1	0

=== Transfers ===
==== Summer ====
In:

No.	Pos.	Nation	Player
2	DF	GER	Mounir Chaftar (from SV Wacker Burghausen)
8	MF	JPN	Yusuke Tasaka (from Kawasaki Frontale)
10	FW	GEO	Alexander Iashvili (from Karlsruher SC)
11	FW	SLO	Zlatko Dedič (loan return from Dynamo Dresden)
12	MF	COL	Michael Javier Ortega (on loan from Bayer Leverkusen and Club Atlas)
13	MF	GER	Marc Rzatkowski (loan return from Arminia Bielefeld)
14	MF	GER	Sören Bertram (from Hamburger SV)
17	DF	GER	Florian Brügmann (from Hamburger SV II)
18	MF	GER	Leon Goretzka (from VfL Bochum youth)
21	FW	GER	Kevin Scheidhauer (on loan from VfL Wolfsburg)
24	DF	GER	Carsten Rothenbach (from FC St. Pauli)
29	GK	GER	Philipp Heerwagen (loan return from FC St. Pauli)
30	FW	GER	Daniel Engelbrecht (from Alemannia Aachen)
39	GK	POR	Daniel Heuer Fernandes (from VfL Bochum II)

Out:

No.	Pos.	Nation	Player
2	DF	GER	Björn Kopplin (to 1. FC Union Berlin)
10	MF	GER	Mimoun Azaouagh (to 1. FC Kaiserslautern)
11	MF	JPN	Takashi Inui (to Eintracht Frankfurt)
14	MF	AUT	Denis Berger (to Hansa Rostock)
16	MF	GER	Kevin Vogt (to FC Augsburg)
17	FW	GER	Oğuzhan Kefkir (to Alemannia Aachen)
18	MF	ITA	Giovanni Federico (to FC Viktoria Köln 1904)
19	MF	GER	Kevin Freiberger (to SV Wacker Burghausen)
21	FW	GER	Daniel Ginczek (loan return to Borussia Dortmund)
24	DF	GER	Philipp Bönig (to Ferencvárosi TC)
28	DF	SWE	Matias Concha (to Malmö FF)
29	GK	GER	Markus Scholz (to Dynamo Dresden)
30	FW	GHA	Hans Kyei (to VfB Hüls)

==== Winter ====
In:

No.	Pos.	Nation	Player
30	DF	DEN	Michael Lumb (from Zenit Saint Petersburg)

Out:

No.	Pos.	Nation	Player
30	FW	GER	Daniel Engelbrecht (on loan to Stuttgarter Kickers)

=== Trials ===
Carlos da Silva (FC Lugano) and Sehar Fejzulahi (free agent) had trial spells with Bochum during the summer transfer window.
