= Onur Bulut =

Turkish professional footballer

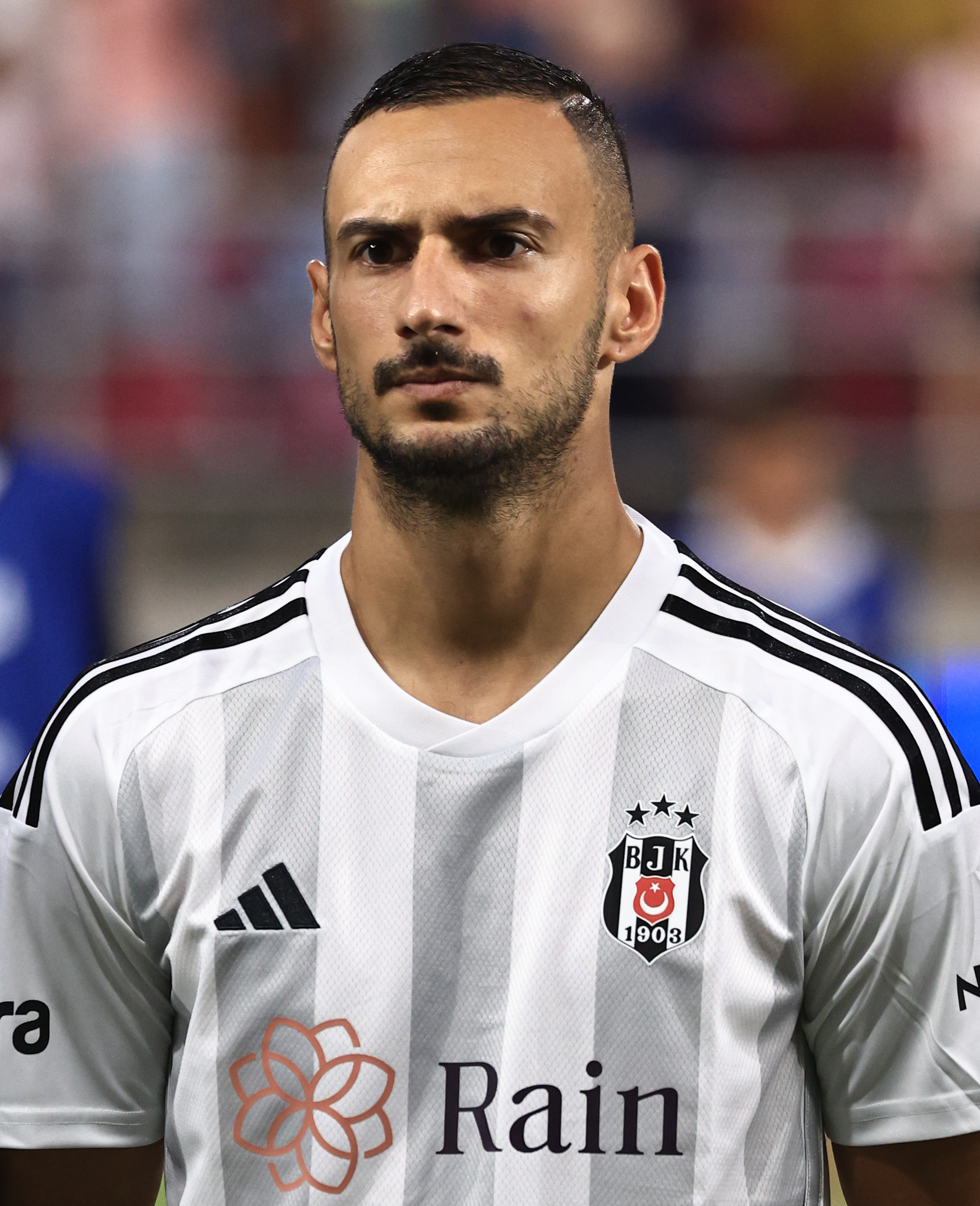
- Bulut with Beşiktaş in 2023

Personal information
- Full name: Onur Bulut
- Date of birth: 16 April 1994 (age 32)
- Place of birth: Werdohl, Germany
- Height: 1.81 m (5 ft 11 in)
- Position: Right back

Team information
- Current team: İstanbul Başakşehir
- Number: 6

Youth career
- 1999–2004: FSV Werdohl
- 2004–2008: SF Oestrich-Iserlohn
- 2008–2013: VfL Bochum

Senior career*
Years	Team	Apps	(Gls)
2011–2015	VfL Bochum II	59	(4)
2012–2016	VfL Bochum	54	(5)
2016–2018	SC Freiburg	22	(0)
2018–2019	Eintracht Braunschweig	31	(2)
2019–2021	Alanyaspor	23	(3)
2020–2021	→ Çaykur Rizespor (loan)	18	(0)
2021–2023	Kayserispor	55	(4)
2023–2025	Beşiktaş	53	(0)
2025–	İstanbul Başakşehir	18	(0)

International career^{‡}
2012–2013	Turkey U19	8	(0)
2022–	Turkey	4	(0)
- * Club domestic league appearances and goals as of 10 June 2026 ‡ National team caps and goals as of 20:35, 12 September 2023 (UTC)

Onur Bulut (born 16 April 1994) is a professional footballer who plays for Süper Lig club İstanbul Başakşehir. Born in Germany, he plays for the Turkey national team. He predominantly plays in a central midfield role, but can also be used out on the right side as both a midfielder and full-back.

== Club career ==
In May 2016, Bulut joined Bundesliga side SC Freiburg from VfL Bochum of the 2. Bundesliga for the forthcoming 2016–2017 season.

In January 2018, he moved to 2. Bundesliga club Eintracht Braunschweig on a 3 1/2-year contract until 2021. A regular starter under manager Torsten Lieberknecht, he made four appearances in the second half of the 2018–19 season under André Schubert.

In July 2019, Bulut was suspended during pre-season and was asked find "a solution for his future". On 27 July 2019, he signed a three-year contract with Süper Lig club Alanyaspor. In 2021, he moved to Kayserispor.

On 8 February 2023, he joined Beşiktaş and signed a contract until 2026.

On 20 June 2025, he signed a two-year contract with Süper Lig side İstanbul Başakşehir.

== International career ==
Born in Germany, Bulut is of Turkish descent. He was a youth international for Turkey, having played for the Turkey U19s. He was called up to the senior Turkey squad for the 2022–23 UEFA Nations League matches against Luxembourg on 22 September 2022 and Faroe Islands on 25 September 2022. He debuted with the senior Turkey team in a friendly 2–1 win over the Czech Republic on 19 November 2022.

== Career statistics ==
=== Club ===
As of match played 16 June 2019

Appearances and goals by club, season and competition
Club	Season	League			Cup		Other		Total	
Club	Season	Division	Apps	Goals	Apps	Goals	Apps	Goals	Apps	Goals
VfL Bochum II	2011–12	Regionalliga West	15	1	—		—		15	1
VfL Bochum II	2012–13	Regionalliga West	30	3	—		—		30	3
VfL Bochum II	2013–14	Regionalliga West	9	0	—		—		9	0
VfL Bochum II	2014–15	Regionalliga West	5	0	—		—		5	0
VfL Bochum II	Total		59	4	—		0	0	59	4
VfL Bochum	2011–12	2. Bundesliga	0	0	0	0	—		0	0
VfL Bochum	2012–13	2. Bundesliga	0	0	0	0	—		0	0
VfL Bochum	2013–14	2. Bundesliga	10	0	1	0	—		11	0
VfL Bochum	2014–15	2. Bundesliga	13	1	0	0	—		0	0
VfL Bochum	2015–16	2. Bundesliga	31	4	4	0	—		35	4
VfL Bochum	Total		54	5	5	0	0	0	59	5
SC Freiburg	2016–17	Bundesliga	21	0	2	0	—		23	0
SC Freiburg	2017–18	Bundesliga	1	0	0	0	0	0	1	0
SC Freiburg	Total		22	0	2	0	0	0	24	0
SC Freiburg II	2017–18	Regionalliga Südwest	4	0	—		—		4	0
Eintracht Braunschweig	2017–18	2. Bundesliga	9	0	0	0	0	0	9	0
Eintracht Braunschweig	2018–19	3. Liga	22	2	1	0	0	0	23	2
Eintracht Braunschweig	Total		31	2	1	0	0	0	32	2
Career total			170	12	8	0	0	0	178	12

=== International ===
As of match played 12 September 2023

Appearances and goals by national team and year
National team	Year	Apps	Goals
Turkey	2022	1	0
Turkey	2023	3	0
Total		4	0

== Honours ==
Beşiktaş

- Turkish Cup: 2023–24
- Turkish Super Cup: 2024
