= 2013–14 Borussia Mönchengladbach season =

Borussia Mönchengladbach
2013–14 season
- Manager: Lucien Favre
- Stadium: Borussia-Park
- Bundesliga: 6th
- DFB-Pokal: First round
- Top goalscorer: League: Raffael (15); All: Raffael (15)
Home colours	Away colours	Third colours

The 2013–14 Borussia Mönchengladbach season was the 114th season in the club's football history. In 2013–14 the club played in the Bundesliga, the top tier of German football. It was the club's sixth consecutive season in this league, having been promoted from the 2. Bundesliga in 2008.

The club also took part in the 2013–14 edition of the DFB-Pokal, where it failed to reach the second round after being defeated by third division side Darmstadt 98.

== Matches ==
=== Legend ===
Win Draw Loss Postponed

=== Bundesliga ===
==== League table ====
Pos	Team	Pld	W	D	L	GF	GA	GD	Pts	Qualification or relegation
4	Bayer Leverkusen	34	19	4	11	60	41	+19	61	Qualification for the Champions League play-off round
5	VfL Wolfsburg	34	18	6	10	63	50	+13	60	Qualification for the Europa League group stage (Note: The 2013–14 DFB-Pokal finalists (Borussia Dortmund and Bayern Munich) qualified for the UEFA Champions League, thus the three Europa League places were distributed through league positions.)
6	Borussia Mönchengladbach	34	16	7	11	59	43	+16	55	Qualification for the Europa League play-off round
7	Mainz 05	34	16	5	13	52	54	−2	53	Qualification for the Europa League third qualifying round
8	FC Augsburg	34	15	7	12	47	47	0	52	

Source: DFB
Rules for classification: 1) points; 2) goal difference; 3) number of goals scored.

==== Matches ====
9 August 2013 1	Bayern Munich	3–1	Borussia Mönchengladbach	Munich
20:30	Robben 12'; Mandžukić 16', (yellow card) 83'; Alaba 69' (pen.)	Report	Dante 40' (o.g.); Kramer (yellow card) 41'; Stranzl (yellow card) 54'; Domínguez (yellow card) 68'	Stadium: Allianz Arena; Attendance: 71,137; Referee: Tobias Welz

17 August 2013 2	Borussia Mönchengladbach	3–0	Hannover 96	Mönchengladbach
18:30	Kruse 20'; Kramer 53'; Xhaka (yellow card) 60'; Daems 66' (pen.)	Report	Prib (yellow card) 47'; Sakai (yellow card) 65'; Andreasen (yellow card) 68'; Pocognoli (yellow card) 90'	Stadium: Borussia-Park; Attendance: 46,089; Referee: Dr. Jochen Drees

24 August 2013 3	Bayer Leverkusen	4–2	Borussia Mönchengladbach	Leverkusen
15:30	Kießling 23' (pen.); Sam 28'; Sam 60'; Castro 72'	Report	Xhaka (yellow card) 21'; Stranzl 54'; Arango 57'	Stadium: BayArena; Attendance: 29,243; Referee: Felix Brych

31 August 2013 4	Borussia Mönchengladbach	4–1	Werder Bremen	Mönchengladbach
15:30	Jantschke (yellow card) 29'; Arango 36'; Xhaka (yellow card) 45'; Raffael 53'; Kruse 74'; Kramer (yellow card) 77'; Herrmann 85'	Report	Nordtveit 69' (o.g.)	Stadium: Borussia-Park; Attendance: 53,392; Referee: Günter Perl

15 September 2013 5	1899 Hoffenheim	2–1	Borussia Mönchengladbach	Hoffenheim
15:30	Modeste 45', (yellow card) 60'; Volland 54'; Beck (yellow card) 56'; Abraham (yellow card) 85'	Report	Janktschke (yellow card) 33'; Hrgota 75'; Xhaka (yellow card) 90'	Stadium: Rhein-Neckar-Arena; Attendance: 29,447; Referee: Christian Dingert

20 September 2013 6	Borussia Mönchengladbach	4–1	Eintracht Braunschweig	Mönchengladbach
20:30	Wendt 22'; Xhaka (yellow card) 24'; Raffael 31', 75'; Kruse 72' (pen.)	Report	Bellarabi (yellow card) 1'; Boland 58'; Bičakčić (yellow card) 71'	Stadium: Borussia-Park; Attendance: 50,064; Referee: Peter Gagelmann

27 September 2013 7	FC Augsburg	2–2	Borussia Mönchengladbach	Augsburg
20:30	Hahn 27'; Verhaegh (yellow card) 29'; Hahn (yellow card) 66'; Milik 88'	Report	Stranzl (yellow card) 5'; Kruse 33'; Hrgota 71', (yellow card) 73'; Ter Stegen (yellow card) 86'	Stadium: SGL arena Attendance: 30,352; Referee: Michael Weiner

5 October 2013 8	Borussia Mönchengladbach	2–0	Borussia Dortmund	Mönchengladbach
15:30	Kruse 82' (pen.); Stranzl (yellow card) 85'; Raffael 86'; Kramer (yellow card) 90'	Report	Großkreutz (yellow card) 36'; Hummels (red card) 80'; Lewandowski (yellow card) 90'	Stadium: Borussia-Park; Attendance: 54,010; Referee: Manuel Gräfe

19 October 2013 9	Hertha BSC	1–0	Borussia Mönchengladbach	Berlin
18:30	Ramos 36', (yellow card) 90'; Kobiashvili (yellow card) 52'	Report	Raffael (yellow card) 33'; Stranzl (red card) 90'	Stadium: Olympic Stadium, Berlin; Attendance: 61,539; Referee: Jochen Drees

27 October 2013 10	Borussia Mönchengladbach	4–1	Eintracht Frankfurt	Mönchengladbach
17:30	Arango 11', (yellow card) 38'; Wendt 18'; Kruse (yellow card) 54'; Herrmann 60'; Raffael 66'	Report	Aigner 15', (yellow card) 29'; Zambrano (yellow card) 30'; Rode (yellow card) 62'; Jung (yellow card) 79'	Stadium: Borussia-Park; Attendance: 53,418; Referee: Felix Zwayer

2 November 2013 11	Hamburger SV	0–2	Borussia Mönchengladbach	Hamburg
15:30		Report	Kruse 23', 63'; Stranzl (yellow card) 46'; Korb (yellow card) 73'	Stadium: Imtech Arena; Attendance: 57,000; Referee: Markus Schmidt

9 November 2013 12	Borussia Mönchengladbach	3–1	1. FC Nürnberg	Mönchengladbach
18:30	Xhaka (yellow card) 32'; Arango (yellow card) 56', (goal) 72'; Stark 75' (o.g.); Herrmann 87'	Report	Drmić 21'; Feulner (yellow card) 74'; Pogatetz (yellow card) 75'	Stadium: Borussia-Park; Attendance: 53,235; Referee: Christian Dingert

22 November 2013 13	VfB Stuttgart	0–2	Borussia Mönchengladbach	Stuttgart
20:30		Report	Raffael 37'; Wendt 73'; Xhaka (yellow card) 75'; Korb (yellow card) 83'	Stadium: Mercedes-Benz Arena; Attendance: 49,560; Referee: Thorsten Kinhöfer

1 December 2013 14	Borussia Mönchengladbach	1–0	SC Freiburg	Mönchengladbach
17:30	Korb (yellow card) 57'; Raffael 63'	Report	Günter (yellow card) 66'; Kerk (yellow card) 74'	Stadium: Borussia Park; Attendance: 50,084; Referee: Robert Hartmann

7 December 2013 15	Borussia Mönchengladbach	2–1	Schalke 04	Mönchengladbach
15:30	Korb (yellow card) 17'; Raffael 24'; Kruse 45+1' (pen.)	Report	Farfán 17' (pen.); Höwedes (yellow card) 34' (yellow-red card) 44'; Uchida (yellow card) 67'; Meyer (yellow card) 72'; Neustädter (yellow card) 80'	Stadium: Borussia-Park; Attendance: 54,010; Referee: Felix Zwayer

14 December 2013 16	Mainz 05	0–0	Borussia Mönchengladbach	Mainz
15:30		Report	Xhaka (yellow card) 24'; Herrmann (yellow card) 87'	Stadium: Coface Arena; Attendance: 34,000; Referee: Markus Schmidt

22 December 2013 17	Borussia Mönchengladbach	2–2	VfL Wolfsburg	Mönchengladbach
15:30	Raffael 59'; Arango 64'; Wendt (yellow card) 71'	Report	Ochs (yellow card) 49'; Diego 53', (yellow card) 55'; Caligiuri (yellow card) 78'; Dost 85'	Stadium: Borussia-Park; Attendance: 53,301; Referee: Günter Perl

24 January 2014 18	Borussia Mönchengladbach	0–2	Bayern Munich	Mönchengladbach
20:30	Wendt (yellow card) 36'; Kramer (yellow card) 81'	Report	Götze 7'; Müller 54'; Kroos (yellow card) 79'	Stadium: Borussia-Park; Attendance: 54,010; Referee: Peter Gagelmann

1 February 2014 19	Hannover 96	3–1	Borussia Mönchengladbach	Hanover
15:30	Rudņevs 57'; Diouf (yellow card) 87', (goal) 90'; Huszti (yellow card) 87'	Report	Korb (yellow card) 73'; Xhaka (yellow card) 75'; Mlapa 84'	Stadium: HDI-Arena; Attendance: 47,000; Referee: Bastian Dankert

8 February 2014 20	Borussia Mönchengladbach	0–1	Bayer Leverkusen	Mönchengladbach
15:30	Herrmann (yellow card) 55'; Kruse (yellow card) 77'	Report	Wollscheid (yellow card) 10'; Can (yellow card) 29'; Kießling (yellow card) 37'; Son 62'; Donati (yellow card) 78'	Stadium: Borussia-Park; Attendance: 53,379; Referee: Florian Meyer

15 February 2014 21	Werder Bremen	1–1	Borussia Mönchengladbach	Bremen
15:30	Obraniak (yellow card) 16', (goal) 88'; Bargfrede (yellow card) 29'; Ignjovski (yellow card) 80'	Report	Raffael 6'; Hrgota (yellow card) 83'	Stadium: Weserstadion; Attendance: 42,100; Referee: Wolfgang Stark

22 February 2014 22	Borussia Mönchengladbach	2–2	1899 Hoffenheim	Mönchengladbach
15:30	Herrmann 4'; Jantschke 18'	Report	Strobl (yellow card) 26'; Firmino 56'; Salihović 82' (pen.)	Stadium: Borussia-Park; Attendance: 49,088; Referee: Tobias Stieler

1 March 2014 23	Eintracht Braunschweig	1–1	Borussia Mönchengladbach	Braunschweig
15:30	Boland (yellow card) 42'; Ter Stegen 52' (o.g.)	Report	Xhaka (yellow card) 16'; Raffael 24'; Jantschke (yellow card) 53'; Kramer (yellow card) 88'	Stadium: Eintracht-Stadion; Attendance: 23,200; Referee: Günter Perl

8 March 2014 24	Borussia Mönchengladbach	1–2	FC Augsburg	Mönchengladbach
15:30	Raffael 5'	Report	Alıntop 35'; Werner 81'	Stadium: Borussia-Park; Attendance: 49,622; Referee: Knut Kircher

15 March 2014 25	Borussia Dortmund	1–2	Borussia Mönchengladbach	Dortmund
15:30	Lewandowski (yellow card) 60'; Jojić 77'	Report	Raffael 31'; Kruse 40'; Nordtveit (yellow card) 68' (yellow-red card) 69'	Stadium: Westfalenstadion; Attendance: 80,645; Referee: Deniz Aytekin

22 March 2014 26	Borussia Mönchengladbach	3–0	Hertha BSC	Mönchengladbach
15:30	Kramer (yellow card) 12'; Arango 28'; Kruse 32'; Raffael 40'	Report	Langkamp (yellow card) 63'	Stadium: Borussia-Park; Attendance: 53,050; Referee: Peter Gagelmann

26 March 2014 27	Eintracht Frankfurt	1–0	Borussia Mönchengladbach	Frankfurt
20:00	Joselu 16'; Russ (yellow card) 45+1'; Flum (yellow card) 56'; Kadlec (yellow card) 86'	Report	Daems (yellow card) 50'	Stadium: Commerzbank-Arena; Attendance: 48,000; Referee: Manuel Gräfe

30 March 2014 28	Borussia Mönchengladbach	3–1	Hamburger SV	Mönchengladbach
15:30	Daems 37'; Raffael 75'	Report	Zoua 28'; Mancienne (yellow card) 65'	Stadium: Borussia-Park; Attendance: 53,650; Referee: Thorsten Kinhöfer

5 March 2014 29	1. FC Nürnberg	0–2	Borussia Mönchengladbach	Nuremberg
15:30	Pinola (yellow card) 17'	Report	Arango 17'; Domínguez (yellow card) 36'; Kramer (yellow card) 66'; Kruse 79' (pen.)	Stadium: Frankenstadion; Attendance: 50,000; Referee: Tobias Stieler

12 April 2014 30	Borussia Mönchengladbach	1–1	VfB Stuttgart	Mönchengladbach
15:30	Korb (yellow card) 28'; Arango 89'	Report	Didavi 12'; Schwaab (yellow card) 13'; Werner (yellow card) 25'; Gruezo (yellow card) 26'	Stadium: Borussia-Park; Attendance: 53,650; Referee: Florian Meyer

19 April 2014 31	SC Freiburg	4–2	Borussia Mönchengladbach	Freiburg im Breisgau
15:30	Mehmedi 51', 87'; Klaus (yellow card) 67'; Sorg 71', (yellow card) 89'; Darida 72'	Report	Herrmann 10'; Xhaka (yellow card) 53' (yellow-red card) 69'; Kruse (yellow card) 70'; Nordtveit 89'	Stadium: Dreisamstadion; Attendance: 24,000; Referee: Peter Gagelmann

26 April 2014 32	Schalke 04	0–1	Borussia Mönchengladbach	Gelsenkirchen
15:30	Kolašinac (yellow card) 74'; Huntelaar (yellow card) 90'	Report	Herrmann 35'	Stadium: Veltins-Arena; Attendance: 61,973; Referee: Manuel Gräfe

3 May 2014 33	Borussia Mönchengladbach	3–1	Mainz 05	Mönchengladbach
15:30	Stranzl 22'; Kruse 54'; Kramer 77'	Report	Choupo-Moting 65'	Stadium: Borussia-Park; Attendance: 54,010; Referee: Felix Zwayer

10 May 2014 34	VfL Wolfsburg	3–1	Borussia Mönchengladbach	Wolfsburg
15:30	Perišić (yellow card) 7', (goal) 68'; De Bruyne 30'; Naldo (yellow card) 49'; Knoche 81'	Report	Kramer (yellow card) 19', (goal) 64'; Nordtveit (yellow card) 37'; Stranzl (yellow card) 67'; Jantschke (yellow card) 85'	Stadium: Volkswagen Arena; Attendance: 30,000; Referee: Wolfgang Stark

=== DFB-Pokal ===
4 August 2013	Darmstadt 98	0–0 (a.e.t.) (5–4 p)	Borussia Mönchengladbach	Darmstadt
14:30		Report		Stadium: Stadion am Böllenfalltor; Attendance: 16,500; Referee: Frank Willenborg (Osnabrück)
	Penalties
	Sulu (penalty scored); Sailer (penalty scored); Costa (penalty scored); Stegmayer (penalty scored); Stroh-Engel (penalty missed); Ivana (penalty scored)		(penalty scored) Daems; (penalty missed) De Jong; (penalty scored) Xhaka; (penalty scored) Kruse; (penalty scored) Stranzl; (penalty missed) Hrgota

== Transfers ==
=== Summer ===
In:

Squad #	Position	Player	Transferred From	Fee	Date
11	MF	(Brazil) Raffael	(Ukraine) Dynamo Kyiv	€5,000,000	1 July 2013
10	FW	(Germany) Max Kruse	(Germany) SC Freiburg	€2,500,000	1 July 2013
23	DF	(Germany) Christoph Kramer	(Germany) Bayer Leverkusen	Loan	1 July 2013

Out:

Squad #	Position	Player	Transferred To	Fee	Date	Sources
10	FW	(Belgium) Igor de Camargo	(Germany) 1899 Hoffenheim	€1,400,000	1 July 2013	
39	FW	(Australia) Mathew Leckie	(Germany) FSV Frankfurt	€300,000	1 July 2013	
9	FW	(Netherlands) Luuk de Jong	(England) Newcastle United	Loan	29 January 2014	

== Statistics ==
No.	Pos	Nat	Player	Total		Bundesliga		DFB-Pokal	
No.	Pos	Nat	Player	Apps	Goals	Apps	Goals	Apps	Goals
1	GK	(Germany) GER	Marc-André ter Stegen	35	0	34	0	1	0
3	DF	(Belgium) BEL	Filip Daems	16	2	15	2	1	0
4	DF	(Netherlands) NED	Roel Brouwers	12	1	12	1	0	0
7	MF	(Germany) GER	Patrick Herrmann	35	6	34	6	1	0
8	MF	(Germany) GER	Lukas Rupp	11	1	10	1	1	0
10	FW	(Germany) GER	Max Kruse	35	12	34	12	1	0
11	FW	(Brazil) BRA	Raffael	35	15	34	15	1	0
14	MF	(Germany) GER	Thorben Marx	2	0	2	0	0	0
15	DF	(Spain) ESP	Álvaro Domínguez	22	1	21	1	1	0
16	MF	(Norway) NOR	Håvard Nordtveit	22	3	21	3	1	0
17	DF	(Sweden) SWE	Oscar Wendt	18	3	18	3	0	0
18	DF	(Venezuela) VEN	Juan Arango	30	8	30	8	0	0
20	MF	(Germany) GER	Nico Brandenburger	0	0	0	0	0	0
21	GK	(Germany) GER	Janis Blaswich	0	0	0	0	0	0
22	FW	(Togo) TOG	Peniel Mlapa	5	1	5	1	0	0
23	MF	(Germany) GER	Christoph Kramer	34	3	33	3	1	0
24	DF	(Germany) GER	Tony Jantschke	33	1	33	1	0	0
25	FW	(Germany) GER	Amin Younes	13	0	13	0	0	0
27	MF	(Germany) GER	Julian Korb	23	0	22	0	1	0
28	MF	(Finland) FIN	Joel Mero	0	0	0	0	0	0
31	FW	(Sweden) SWE	Branimir Hrgota	31	2	30	2	1	0
33	GK	(Germany) GER	Christofer Heimeroth	0	0	0	0	0	0
34	MF	(Switzerland) SUI	Granit Xhaka	29	1	28	1	1	0
39	DF	(Austria) AUT	Martin Stranzl	31	2	30	2	1	0
Players are no longer at the club
9	ST	(Netherlands) NED	Luuk de Jong	14	0	13	0	1	0
