= Sven Kreyer =

German footballer

Personal information
- Date of birth: 14 May 1991 (age 35)
- Place of birth: Düsseldorf, Germany
- Height: 1.80 m (5 ft 11 in)
- Position: Striker

Team information
- Current team: Ratingen 04/19
- Number: 11

Youth career
- –2005: Fortuna Düsseldorf
- 2005–2010: Bayer Leverkusen

Senior career*
Years	Team	Apps	(Gls)
2010–2012	Bayer Leverkusen II	52	(9)
2012–2014	VfL Bochum II	36	(27)
2013–2014	VfL Bochum	11	(1)
2014–2015	Rot-Weiss Essen	29	(9)
2015–2020	Viktoria Köln	117	(34)
2020–2024	Rot-Weiß Oberhausen	139	(59)
2024–	Ratingen 04/19	17	(5)
- * Club domestic league appearances and goals as of 17 March 2025

Sven Kreyer (born 14 May 1991) is a German footballer who has played as a striker for Oberliga Niederrhein club Ratingen 04/19 since 2024.

== Career ==
=== Statistics ===
As of 27 March 2025:

Club performance			League		Cup		Total	
Season	Club	League	Apps	Goals	Apps	Goals	Apps	Goals
Germany			League		DFB-Pokal		Total	
2010–11	Bayer Leverkusen II	Regionalliga West	23	1	—		23	1
2011–12	Bayer Leverkusen II	Regionalliga West	29	8	—		29	8
2012–13	VfL Bochum II	Regionalliga West	17	13	—		17	13
2013–14	VfL Bochum II	Regionalliga West	19	14	—		19	14
2013–14	VfL Bochum	2. Bundesliga	11	1	1	0	12	1
2014–15	Rot-Weiss Essen	Regionalliga West	29	9	—		29	9
2015–16	FC Viktoria Köln	Regionalliga West	22	2	2	0	24	2
2016–17	FC Viktoria Köln	Regionalliga West	24	12	—		24	12
2017–18	FC Viktoria Köln	Regionalliga West	18	10	—		18	10
2018–19	FC Viktoria Köln	Regionalliga West	31	9	1	0	32	9
2019–20	FC Viktoria Köln	3. Liga	19	1	—		19	1
2020–21	Rot-Weiß Oberhausen	Regionalliga West	39	14	—		39	14
2021–22	Rot-Weiß Oberhausen	Regionalliga West	38	14	—		38	14
2022–23	Rot-Weiß Oberhausen	3. Liga	30	21	—		30	21
2023–24	Rot-Weiß Oberhausen	3. Liga	32	10	—		32	10
2024–25	Ratingen 04/19	Oberliga Niederrhein	17	5	—		17	5
Total	Germany		398	144	5	0	403	144
Career total			398	144	5	0	403	144
