= Palmar de Varela =

Coordinates: 10°45′N 74°45′W

- Municipality and town
- Flag Coat of arms

- Location of the municipality and town of Palmar de Varela in the Department of Atlántico.
- Country: Colombia
- Region: Caribbean
- Department: Atlántico

Government
  - Mayor: Jose Junior Rua (Radical Change Party)

Area
  - Municipality and town: 92.34 km^{2} (35.65 sq mi)
  - Urban: 2.86 km^{2} (1.10 sq mi)

Population (2018 census)
  - Municipality and town: 28,932
  - Density: 313.3/km^{2} (811.5/sq mi)
  - Urban: 27,728
  - Urban density: 9,700/km^{2} (25,100/sq mi)
- Time zone: UTC-5 (Colombia Standard Time)
- Website: www.palmardevarela-atlantico.gov.co

Palmar de Varela is a municipality and town in the Colombian department of Atlántico.
