= Mario Jelavić =

Croatian footballer

Personal information
- Full name: Mario Jelavić
- Date of birth: 20 August 1993 (age 33)
- Place of birth: Split, Croatia
- Height: 1.89 m (6 ft 2 1/2 in)
- Position: Forward

Team information
- Current team: Lokomotiva Rijeka
- Number: 22

Youth career
- –2005: Omiš
- 2006: RNK Split
- 2006–2008: Rijeka
- 2008–2013: Hajduk Split
- 2015: Åtvidabergs FF U21

Senior career*
Years	Team	Apps	(Gls)
2011–2013	Hajduk Split	1	(0)
2013	Slaven Belupo	8	(2)
2013–2014	VfL Bochum	0	(0)
2014–2015	Atlético Madrid C	4	(0)
2015–2016	Åtvidabergs FF	19	(1)
2016–2017	Solin	29	(12)
2017–2018	Istra 1961	12	(0)
2018	Mouscron	8	(1)
2019	Dugopolje	12	(1)
2019–2020	Solin	16	(4)
2020–2021	Rudeš	24	(7)
2021–2022	Akritas	26	(11)
2022–2023	Krka	12	(1)
2023	Zrinski Jurjevac	8	(0)
2025	Croatia Zmijavci	0	(0)
2025	Omiš	7	(0)
2026–	Lokomotiva Rijeka	14	(3)

International career
2010	Croatia U17	1	(0)
2011	Croatia U18	4	(1)
2011–2012	Croatia U19	7	(3)
- * Club domestic league appearances and goals as of 23 July 2026

Mario Jelavić (born 20 August 1993) is a Croatian football forward, currently playing for Četvrta NL Rijeka side Lokomotiva Rijeka.

== Club career ==
In 2014, Jelavić signed for Atlético Madrid C.

Jelavić made his debut for Hajduk, the club he spent four formative seasons with, on 31 July 2011 in a 1–0 defeat against NK Zadar. It was his only appearance for the 2011–12 season. For the second half of the 2012–13 season, Jelavić went out on loan to NK Slaven Belupo, making 8 appearances of which 3 were in the starting line-up, but didn't score a goal. For the 2014–15 season, Jelavić joined Atvidabergs FF. He scored 13 goals in 12 games for the club's youth side and 1 goal in 19 games for the first team, 1 of those appearances being from the starting line-up. For the 2015–16 season, Jelavić returned to Croatia, joining NK Solin. He was sent off on debut against Dinamo Zagreb II but scored in his next game against NK Lučko.

Jelavić spent the 2021/22 season in the Cypriot Second Division playing for Akritas Chlorakas, scoring 11 goals in 26 matches. He moved subsequently to the Slovenian Second Division side NK Krka, leaving the club as a free agent in January 2023, having scored one goal in twelve matches.
