= Christoph Kramer =

German footballer (born 1991)

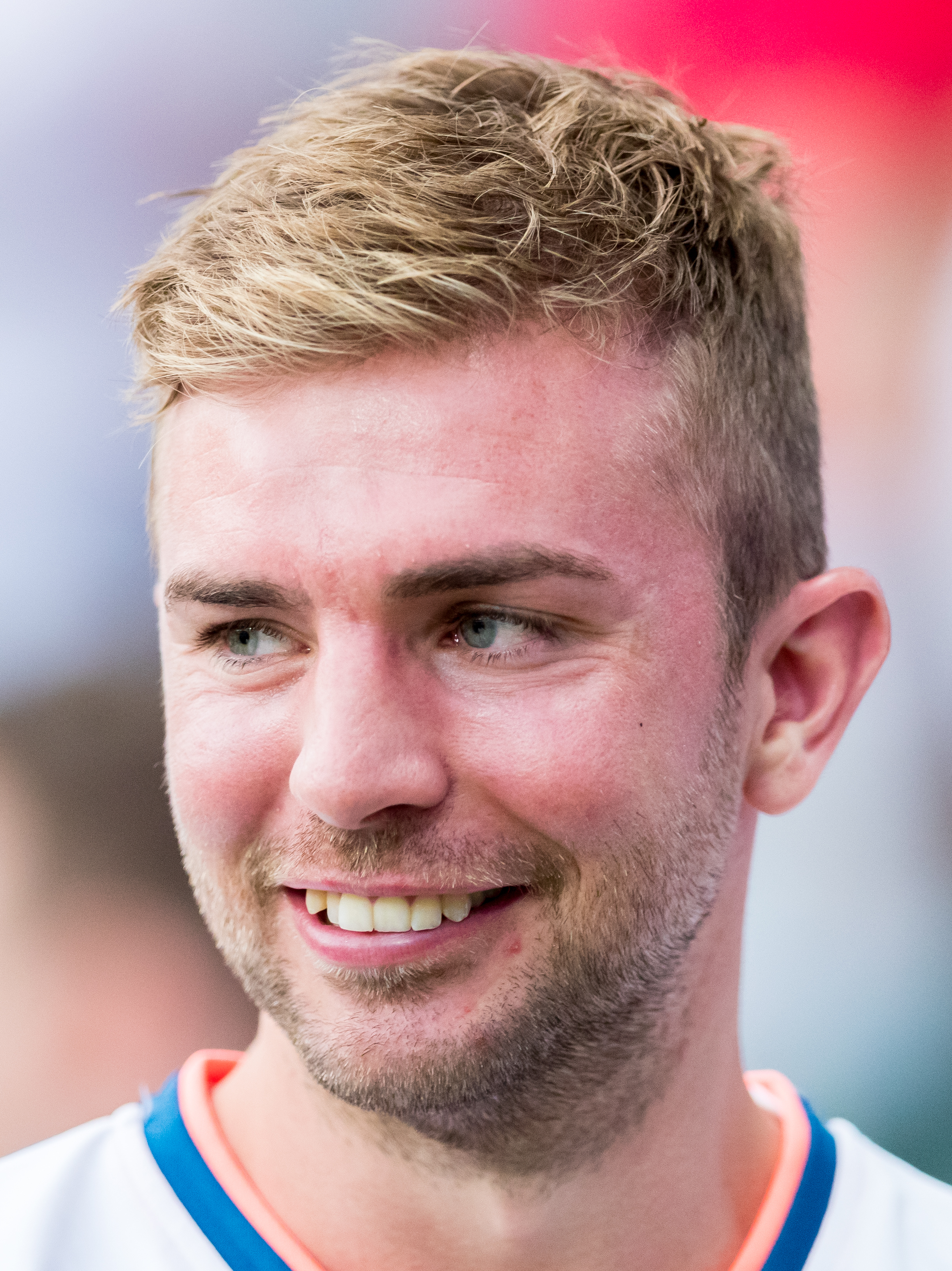
- Kramer in 2022

Personal information
- Full name: Christoph Kramer
- Date of birth: 19 February 1991 (age 35)
- Place of birth: Solingen, Germany
- Height: 1.91 m (6 ft 3 in)
- Position: Defensive midfielder

Youth career
- 1995–1999: BV Gräfrath
- 1999–2006: Bayer Leverkusen
- 2006–2008: Fortuna Düsseldorf
- 2008–2010: Bayer Leverkusen

Senior career*
Years	Team	Apps	(Gls)
2009–2011	Bayer Leverkusen II	27	(0)
2011–2016	Bayer Leverkusen	28	(0)
2011–2013	→ VfL Bochum (loan)	61	(4)
2012	→ VfL Bochum II (loan)	1	(0)
2013–2015	→ Borussia Mönchengladbach (loan)	63	(5)
2016–2024	Borussia Mönchengladbach	180	(5)
Total		360	(14)

International career
2009–2010	Germany U19	5	(0)
2010–2012	Germany U20	4	(1)
2014–2016	Germany	12	(0)
Medal record
Men's football
Representing Germany
FIFA World Cup
Winner	2014 Brazil
- * Club domestic league appearances and goals

Christoph Kramer (born 19 February 1991) is a German former professional footballer who played as a defensive midfielder.

After a season in their reserve team, Kramer was promoted to Bayer Leverkusen's first team in 2011. He then spent two seasons on loan at second-tier VfL Bochum, and a further two at Borussia Mönchengladbach, before joining Mönchengladbach permanently in 2016. He would go on to become an established figure in the club's midfield, acquiring 215 total appearances for Mönchengladbach over his eight seasons with the club, before leaving in August 2024.

A former youth international, Kramer made his full international debut for the Germany national team in May 2014, and later that year was part of the squad which won the 2014 FIFA World Cup.

== Club career ==
=== Bayer Leverkusen ===
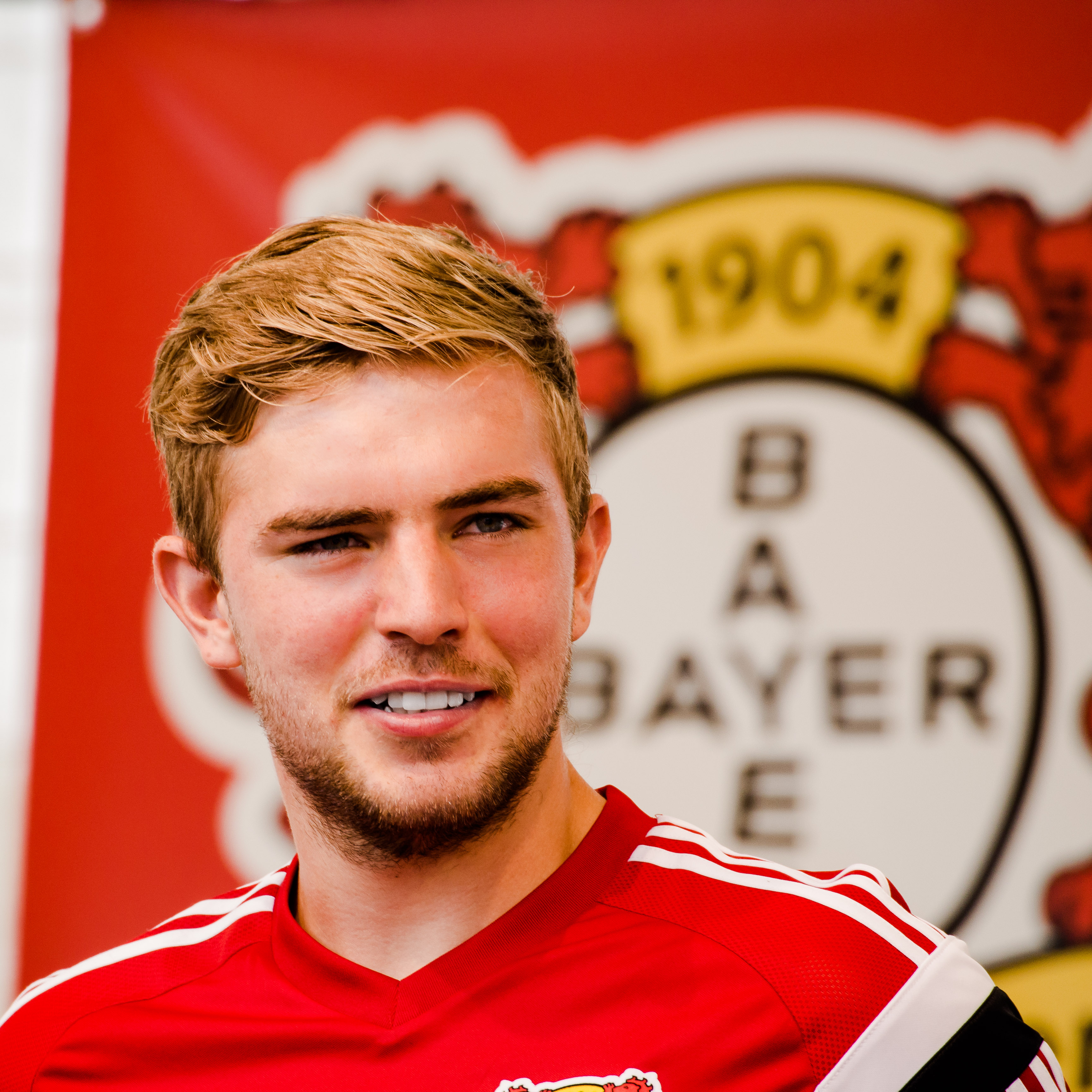
Kramer with Bayer Leverkusen in 2015

Kramer joined local club BV Graefrath in 1995 before being snapped up by Bayer Leverkusen at age eight. But Kramer was cut from the Leverkusen youth squad at age 15 in 2006 because of his relatively small height. After two years with the Fortuna Düsseldorf youth squad, Kramer returned to Leverkusen in 2008, signed his first senior contract in 2010 and was promoted to Bayer Leverkusen II for the 2010–11 season. He gained promotion to the senior squad in 2011 and was immediately loaned out to 2. Bundesliga side VfL Bochum for the 2011–12 season.

==== VfL Bochum (loan) ====
Kramer made his professional debut on 18 July 2011, coming on as a second-half substitute for Andreas Johansson in a 2–0 defeat of Bochum to Fortuna Düsseldorf. His first goal for the club came on 25 February 2012, scoring a consolation goal in a 6–2 defeat to Greuther Fürth. During the 2012–13 2. Bundesliga season, Kramer was involved in 852 tackles, the most by any player in the league, and won 50% of them. In the process, he committed 73 fouls but was only given eight yellow cards. In his two seasons in the second division with Bochum, Kramer made 61 league appearances and scored four goals. Following his spell at Bochum, he became a season-ticket holder at the RewirpowerSTADION.

==== Borussia Mönchengladbach (loan) ====
Following his two-year spell with Bochum in the second division, Kramer joined Borussia Mönchengladbach in July 2013 on a two-year loan deal. He made his Bundesliga debut on 9 August 2013, starting in midfield for Gladbach in a 3–1 loss to defending champions Bayern Munich. He scored his first goal for Gladbach in the following round of fixtures, netting the club's second goal in a 3–0 victory over Hannover 96. Kramer scored Borussia Mönchengladbach's third goal of a 3–1 victory over Mainz 05 on 3 May 2014, securing the club a place in the UEFA Europa League for the following season. In the final league match of the season, Kramer scored his third Bundesliga goal as Gladbach fell to VfL Wolfsburg 3–1, confirming that Gladbach would finish just behind Wolfsburg, in sixth place.

Kramer returned to Gladbach following his exploits in the 2014 FIFA World Cup, making his season debut on 24 August 2014, coming off the bench and scoring his side's last-minute equalizer in a 1−1 draw with VfB Stuttgart. On 9 November, away to Borussia Dortmund, he scored an own goal from inside the centre circle which gave his opponents a 1–0 victory.

On 22 December 2014, Leverkusen announced Kramer would be returning to Leverkusen from his loan spell at Gladbach in summer 2015 as planned and that his contract had been extended by two further years until 30 June 2019.

=== Borussia Mönchengladbach ===
On 8 June 2016, Kramer returned to Borussia Mönchengladbach, signing a five-year deal with the club.

On 16 August 2024, after a total of eleven years and over 280 appearances for the club, Mönchengladbach terminated Kramer's contract by mutual agreement.

== International career ==
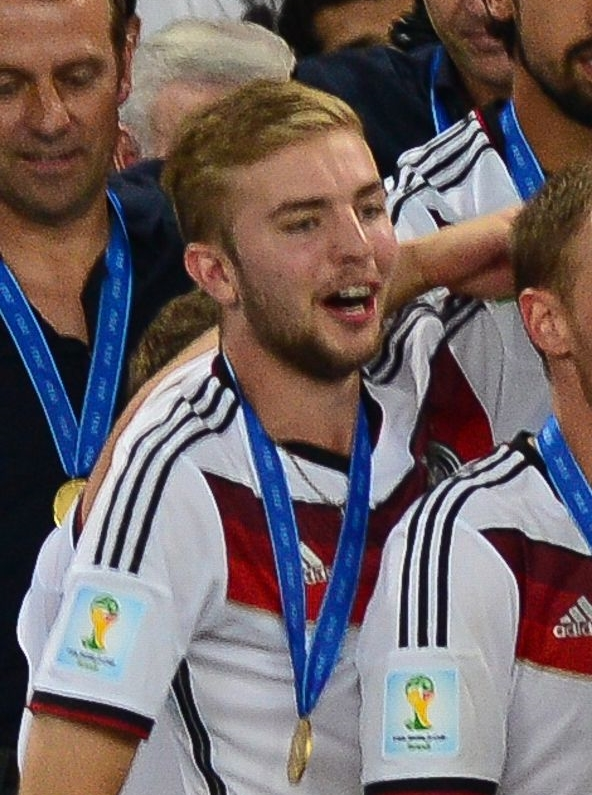
Kramer celebrating Germany's win of the 2014 FIFA World Cup

Shortly before the end of his first Bundesliga season, Kramer was first invited on 8 May 2014 to the Germany senior team, when he was nominated as part of a so-called "perspective squad" for the preparation match for the 2014 World Cup in the Volksparkstadion in Hamburg against Poland, as many players could not join because they still had to play for their clubs. In this friendly match on 13 May, he played the full 90 minutes of a 0–0 draw. A day later, he was subsequently nominated for the preliminary squad. He won his second cap for the national side on 1 June, coming on as a second-half substitute in a 2–2 draw with Cameroon. The following day, Kramer was included by Joachim Löw in Germany's final 23-man squad for the 2014 World Cup in Brazil.

=== 2014 World Cup ===
Kramer made his first appearance of the tournament in Germany's round of 16 match against Algeria as a 109th-minute substitute for Bastian Schweinsteiger. He started the 2014 FIFA World Cup Final, due to an injury to Sami Khedira minutes before kick off. Kramer, however, was forced to leave the game in the first half after taking a hit to the head, and André Schürrle came on to replace him. It was later revealed that Kramer may have suffered a concussion from his collision with Argentine centre-back Ezequiel Garay. Referee Nicola Rizzoli admitted that 14 minutes after the collision, Kramer came to him, asking if the match was the final. Rizzoli then informed Schweinsteiger and Kramer was substituted off. The incident was later satirized by his national teammates Thomas Müller, Manuel Neuer and retired national team captain Philipp Lahm in a video which was shown during Kramer's appearance on the German sports show Das aktuelle sportstudio.

Towards the end of his international career, Kramer was a part of a collaboration between the German Football Association and The LEGO Group, who in May 2016 released a Europe-exclusive collectible minifigure series, with Kramer featured as the fourteenth of sixteen minifigures in the collection.

== Personal life ==
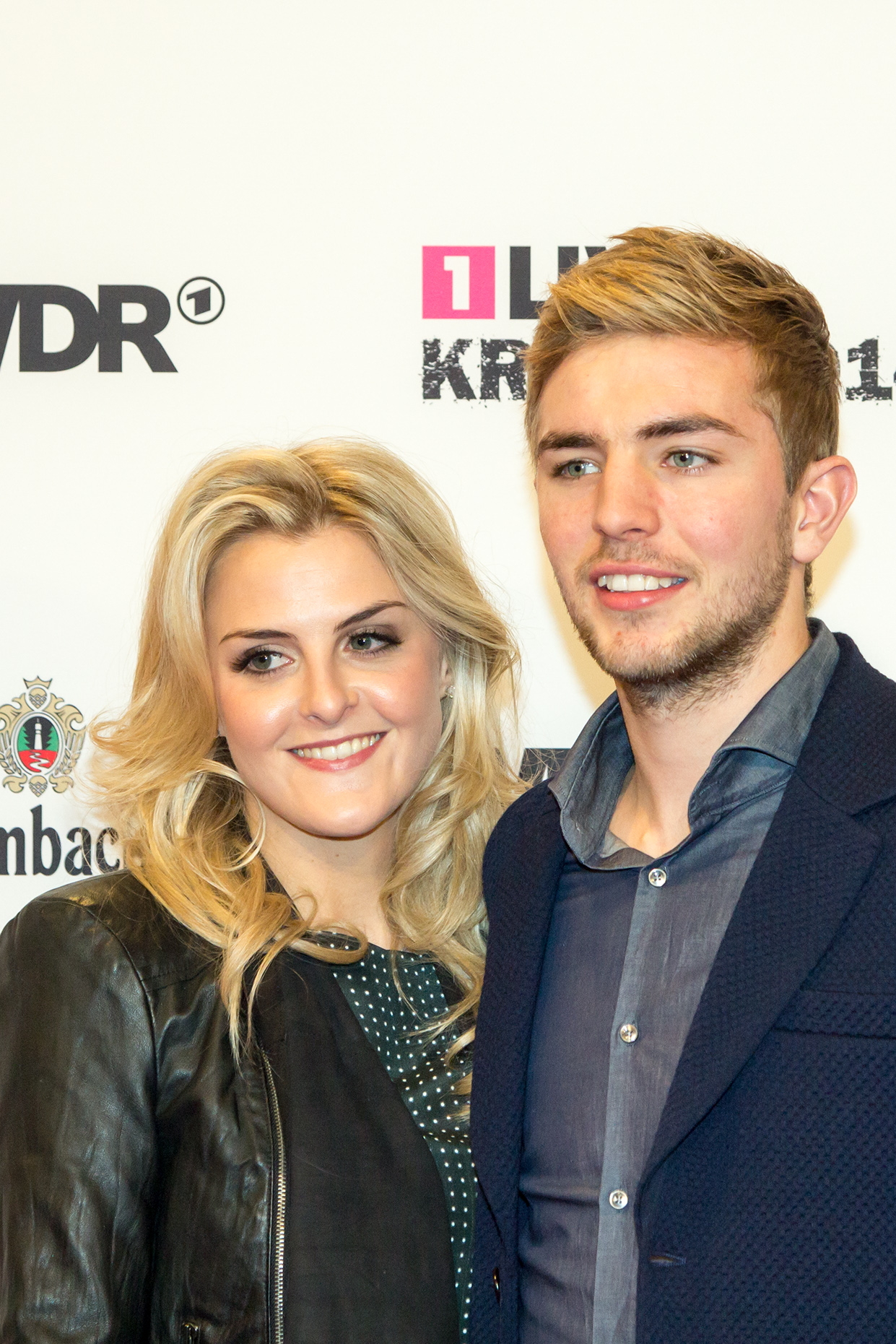
Kramer in 2014

Kramer went to school at Grundschule Meigen in Solingen from 1997 to 2001. He continued secondary education at August-Dicke-Schule and finished his Abitur examination in 2010, with a grade of 3.6.

Kramer was the first Solingen citizen to have played for Germany at a World Cup when he participated in the 2014 World Cup. Four years later, during 2018 FIFA World Cup, he appeared on German TV station ZDF as a pundit to deliver match analyses.

== Career statistics ==
=== Club ===
Appearances and goals by club, season and competition
Club	Season	League			DFB-Pokal		Europe		Total	
Club	Season	Division	Apps	Goals	Apps	Goals	Apps	Goals	Apps	Goals
Bayer Leverkusen II	2009–10	Regionalliga West	1	0	—		—		1	0
Bayer Leverkusen II	2010–11	Regionalliga West	26	0	—		—		26	0
Bayer Leverkusen II	Total		27	0	0	0	0	0	27	0
VfL Bochum (loan)	2011–12	2. Bundesliga	32	1	3	0	—		35	1
VfL Bochum (loan)	2012–13	2. Bundesliga	29	3	3	0	—		32	3
VfL Bochum (loan)	Total		61	4	6	0	0	0	67	4
VfL Bochum II (loan)	2012–13	Regionalliga West	1	0	—		—		1	0
Borussia Mönchengladbach (loan)	2013–14	Bundesliga	33	3	1	0	—		34	3
Borussia Mönchengladbach (loan)	2014–15	Bundesliga	30	2	3	0	6	0	39	2
Borussia Mönchengladbach (loan)	Total		63	5	4	0	6	0	73	5
Bayer Leverkusen	2015–16	Bundesliga	28	0	4	0	12	0	44	0
Borussia Mönchengladbach	2016–17	Bundesliga	24	0	4	0	10	0	38	0
Borussia Mönchengladbach	2017–18	Bundesliga	27	3	1	0	—		28	3
Borussia Mönchengladbach	2018–19	Bundesliga	18	2	1	0	—		19	2
Borussia Mönchengladbach	2019–20	Bundesliga	22	0	0	0	4	0	26	0
Borussia Mönchengladbach	2020–21	Bundesliga	28	0	4	0	7	1	39	1
Borussia Mönchengladbach	2021–22	Bundesliga	18	0	1	0	—		19	0
Borussia Mönchengladbach	2022–23	Bundesliga	29	0	1	0	—		30	0
Borussia Mönchengladbach	2023–24	Bundesliga	14	0	2	0	—		16	0
Borussia Mönchengladbach	Total		180	5	14	0	21	1	215	6
Career total			358	14	28	0	39	1	431	15

=== International ===
Appearances and goals by national team and year
National team	Year	Apps	Goals
Germany	2014	8	0
Germany	2015	3	0
Germany	2016	1	0
Total		12	0

== Honours ==
Germany

- FIFA World Cup: 2014
