= Michael Ortega =

Colombian footballer (born 1991)

Personal information
- Full name: Michael Javier Ortega Dieppa
- Date of birth: 6 April 1991 (age 35)
- Place of birth: Palmar de Varela, Atlántico, Colombia
- Height: 1.70 m (5 ft 7 in)
- Position: Attacking midfielder

Team information
- Current team: The Strongest
- Number: 10

Youth career
- 2004–2009: Deportivo Cali

Senior career*
| Years | Team | Apps | (Gls) |
| 2009–2010 | Deportivo Cali | 30 | (3) |
| 2010–2013 | Atlas | 17 | (1) |
| 2011–2013 | → Bayer Leverkusen (loan) | 12 | (2) |
| 2012–2013 | → VfL Bochum (loan) | 11 | (0) |
| 2013–2015 | Junior | 66 | (8) |
| 2016 | Figueirense | 10 | (1) |
| 2017–2018 | Once Caldas | 29 | (5) |
| 2018 | Deportivo Pasto | 12 | (2) |
| 2018–2019 | Baniyas | 25 | (6) |
| 2019–2020 | Omonia | 14 | (2) |
| 2021–2022 | Deportivo Cali | 30 | (1) |
| 2022– | The Strongest | 56 | (13) |

International career
| 2011 | Colombia U20 | 13 | (1) |
- * Club domestic league appearances and goals as of 23:01, 31 March 2024 (UTC)

Michael Javier Ortega Dieppa (born 6 April 1991) is a Colombian football midfielder who plays for Bolivian side The Strongest.

== Career ==
Born in Palmar de Varela, Atlántico, Ortega joined Deportivo Cali as youth and rose to the professional team. On 7 March 2010, he made his debut to the senior team. At only 17 years, he played the first 68 minutes of the game against Junior. On 4 August 2009, he made his debut in the Copa Sudamericana. He was starter against Universidad de Chile.

On 10 July 2009, Ortega joined Mexican club Atlas. In 2011, he represented Colombia in the 2011 South American Youth Championship and the 2011 FIFA U-20 World Cup.

On 17 August 2011, Ortega signed for Bundesliga side Bayer 04 Leverkusen on a loan deal from Atlas with the option to sign him in summer of 2013. On 7 August 2012, Bayer Leverkusen loaned Ortega to VfL Bochum.

Michael Ortega joined Atletico Junior in July 2013 permanently for $1 million from Brazilian club Figueirense.

== Career statistics ==
As of match played on 7 April 2018

Appearances and goals by club, season and competition
| Club | Season | League | | | Cup | | League Cup | | Other | | Total | |
| Club | Season | Division | Apps | Goals | Apps | Goals | Apps | Goals | Apps | Goals | Apps | Goals |
|---|---|---|---|---|---|---|---|---|---|---|---|---|
| Deportivo Cali | 2009 | Categoría Primera A | 23 | 1 | 0 | 0 | — | | 2 | 0 | 25 | 1 |
| Deportivo Cali | 2010 | Categoría Primera A | 7 | 2 | 0 | 0 | — | | | | 7 | 2 |
| Deportivo Cali | Total | | 30 | 3 | 0 | 0 | 0 | 0 | 2 | 0 | 32 | 3 |
| Atlas | 2010–11 | Mexican Primera División | 17 | 1 | 0 | 0 | — | | | | 17 | 1 |
| Bayer Leverkusen (loan) | 2011–12 | Bundesliga | 7 | 0 | 0 | 0 | — | | | | 7 | 0 |
| VfL Bochum (loan) | 2012–13 | 2. Bundesliga | 9 | 0 | 2 | 1 | — | | | | 11 | 1 |
| Junior | 2013 | Categoría Primera A | 18 | 3 | 2 | 0 | — | | | | 20 | 3 |
| Junior | 2014 | Categoría Primera A | 20 | 1 | 10 | 0 | — | | | | 30 | 1 |
| Junior | 2015 | Categoría Primera A | 25 | 1 | 7 | 1 | — | | 3 | 1 | 35 | 3 |
| Junior | Total | | 63 | 5 | 19 | 1 | 0 | 0 | 3 | 1 | 85 | 7 |
| Figueirense | 2016 | Campeonato Brasileiro Série A | 7 | 0 | 1 | 0 | — | | 2 | 0 | 10 | 0 |
| Once Caldas | 2017 | Categoría Primera A | 29 | 5 | 2 | 0 | — | | | | 31 | 5 |
| Deportivo Pasto | 2018 | Categoría Primera A | 9 | 1 | 0 | 0 | — | | | | 9 | 1 |
| Career totals | | | 171 | 15 | 24 | 2 | 0 | 0 | 7 | 1 | 202 | 18 |
