= Daniel Engelbrecht =

German footballer (born 1990)

Personal information
- Full name: Daniel Engelbrecht
- Date of birth: 5 November 1990 (age 35)
- Place of birth: Cologne, Germany
- Height: 1.86 m (6 ft 1 in)
- Position: Forward

Youth career
- 1996–2002: SV Grün-Weiss Brauweiler
- 2002–2004: SC Köln Weiler-Volkhoven
- 2004–2008: Bedburger BV
- 2008–2009: Bayer Leverkusen

Senior career*
Years	Team	Apps	(Gls)
2009–2012	Alemannia Aachen II	73	(48)
2012–2013	VfL Bochum II	18	(9)
2012–2013	VfL Bochum	1	(0)
2013	→ Stuttgarter Kickers (loan)	14	(1)
2013–2016	Stuttgarter Kickers	24	(3)
2015	Stuttgarter Kickers II	4	(2)
2016	Alemannia Aachen	13	(5)
2016–2017	TSV Steinbach	14	(5)
2017–2018	Rot-Weiss Essen	0	(0)
Total		161	(73)
- * Club domestic league appearances and goals

Daniel Engelbrecht (born 5 November 1990) is a German retired professional footballer who played as a forward.

== Club career ==
On 20 July 2013, while playing his second game of the 2014–15 season for the Stuttgarter Kickers against Rot-Weiß Erfurt, Engelbrecht suddenly collapsed on the pitch due to a sudden heart attack. He was later diagnosed with myocarditis and chronic heart rhythm disorders. After four operations to the heart, including one where a defibrillator was implanted and a waiting period of 17 months, Engelbrecht returned to the pitch on 15 November 2014. He is the first professional football player to play with an implanted defibrillator in Germany. On 6 December 2014, Daniel Engelbrecht shot the winning goal against SV Wehen Wiesbaden in the 91st minute, thereby becoming the only professional footballer to score a goal with such a handicap.

Following the recurrence of his heart problems, Engelbrecht announced that he would interrupt his career on doctor's recommendation, and that he would focus on becoming a coach. This interruption turned into permanent retirement in 2018, when it became known that Engelbrecht's defibrillator had already brought him back to life on three occasions.

== Managerial career ==
On 1 July 2019, Engelbrecht was announced as the new head of VfL Bochum's youth talent scouting division.

== Career statistics ==
Appearances and goals by club, season and competition
Club	Season	League			DFB-Pokal		Total	
Club	Season	Division	Apps	Goals	Apps	Goals	Apps	Goals
Alemannia Aachen II	2009–10	NRW-Liga	27	13	—		27	13
Alemannia Aachen II	2010–11	NRW-Liga	30	21	—		30	21
Alemannia Aachen II	2011–12	NRW-Liga	16	14	—		16	14
Alemannia Aachen II	Total		73	48	0	0	73	48
VfL Bochum II	2012–13	Regionalliga West	18	9	—		18	9
VfL Bochum	2012–13	2. Bundesliga	1	0	1	0	2	0
Stuttgarter Kickers (loan)	2012–13	3. Liga	14	1	—		14	1
Stuttgarter Kickers	2013–14	3. Liga	2	0	—		2	0
Stuttgarter Kickers	2014–15	3. Liga	19	3	—		19	3
Stuttgarter Kickers	2015–16	3. Liga	3	0	—		3	0
Stuttgarter Kickers	Total		24	3	0	0	24	3
Stuttgarter Kickers II	2015–16	Oberliga Baden-Württemberg	4	2	—		4	2
Alemannia Aachen	2015–16	Regionalliga West	13	5	—		13	5
TSV Steinbach	2016–17	Regionalliga Südwest	14	5	—		14	5
Rot-Weiss Essen	2017–18	Regionalliga West	0	0	—		0	0
Career total			161	73	1	0	162	73
