= Fabian Holthaus =

German footballer

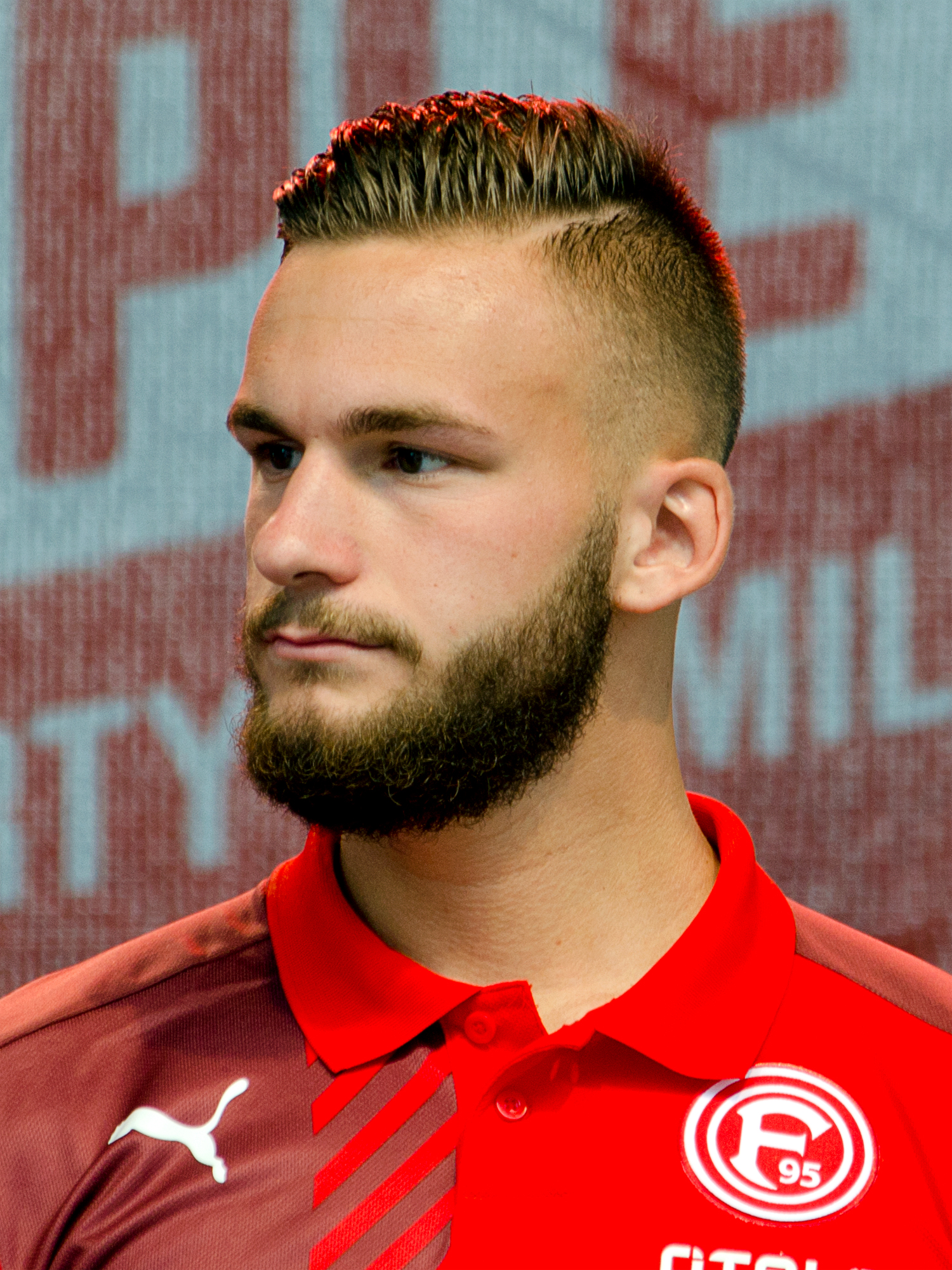
- Holthaus in 2015

Personal information
- Date of birth: 17 January 1995 (age 31)
- Place of birth: Hamm, Germany
- Height: 1.78 m (5 ft 10 in)
- Position: Left back

Team information
- Current team: Rot Weiss Ahlen
- Number: 6

Youth career
- Fortuna Herringen
- SVF Herringen
- –2010: Hammer SpVg
- 2010–2014: VfL Bochum

Senior career*
Years	Team	Apps	(Gls)
2013–2014	VfL Bochum II	29	(0)
2013–2015	VfL Bochum	9	(0)
2015–2016	Fortuna Düsseldorf	2	(0)
2016	→ Dynamo Dresden (loan)	11	(0)
2016–2018	Hansa Rostock	60	(1)
2018–2019	Energie Cottbus	20	(1)
2019–2021	Viktoria Köln	43	(1)
2021–2024	Rot-Weiß Oberhausen	76	(3)
2024–	Rot Weiss Ahlen	0	(0)

International career
2011	Germany U-17	1	(0)
2012–2013	Germany U-18	5	(0)
2013–2014	Germany U-19	17	(1)
2014	Germany U-20	4	(0)
Medal record
Winner	European U19 Championship	2014
- * Club domestic league appearances and goals as of 18 May 2024

Fabian Holthaus (born 17 January 1995) is a German professional football left back who plays for Rot Weiss Ahlen.

== Career statistics ==
As of match played 1 August 2018

Appearances and goals by club, season and competition
Club	Season	League			DFB-Pokal		Total	
Club	Season	Division	Apps	Goals	Apps	Goals	Apps	Goals
VfL Bochum II	2012–13	Regionalliga West	1	0	—		1	0
VfL Bochum II	2013–14	Regionalliga West	23	0	—		23	0
VfL Bochum II	2014–15	Regionalliga West	5	0	—		5	0
VfL Bochum II	Total		29	0	—		29	0
VfL Bochum	2012–13	2. Bundesliga	1	0	0	0	1	0
VfL Bochum	2013–14	2. Bundesliga	4	0	1	0	5	0
VfL Bochum	2014–15	2. Bundesliga	4	0	1	0	5	0
VfL Bochum	Total		9	0	2	0	11	0
Fortuna Düsseldorf	2015–16	2. Bundesliga	2	0	0	0	2	0
Dynamo Dresden	2015–16	3. Liga	11	0	—		11	0
Hansa Rostock	2016–17	3. Liga	23	1	1	0	24	1
Hansa Rostock	2017–18	3. Liga	37	0	1	0	38	0
Hansa Rostock	Total		60	1	2	0	62	1
Career total			111	1	4	0	113	1
