= Mounir Chaftar =

German footballer

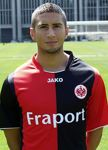
- Mounir Chaftar in the Eintracht Frankfurt shirt

Personal information
- Full name: Mounir Chaftar
- Date of birth: 29 January 1986 (age 40)
- Place of birth: Frankfurt am Main, West Germany
- Height: 1.83 m (6 ft 0 in)
- Position: Left back

Youth career
- 1995–2000: Eintracht Frankfurt
- 2000–2002: Kickers Offenbach
- 2002–2004: Eintracht Frankfurt

Senior career*
Years	Team	Apps	(Gls)
2004–2008	Eintracht Frankfurt II	39	(5)
2005–2008	Eintracht Frankfurt	9	(0)
2008	MSV Duisburg	5	(0)
2008	MSV Duisburg II	1	(0)
2009–2010	Kickers Offenbach	31	(0)
2010–2011	Eintracht Frankfurt II	25	(0)
2011–2012	Wacker Burghausen	32	(0)
2012–2014	VfL Bochum	22	(0)
2013	→ VfL Bochum II	3	(0)
2014–2016	1. FC Saarbrücken	51	(1)
2016–2019	Wacker Nordhausen	47	(1)
2017–2019	Wacker Nordhausen II	7	(0)

International career
2003	Germany U17	2	(0)
2003–2004	Germany U18	5	(0)
2004–2005	Germany U19	7	(0)
2007	Germany U21	1	(0)
- * Club domestic league appearances and goals as of 20:02, 18 March 2020 (UTC)

Mounir Chaftar (born 29 January 1986 in Frankfurt am Main) is a German football defender of Tunisian descent.

== Career ==
=== Wacker Nordhausen ===
Chaftar joined FSV Wacker 90 Nordhausen in the summer 2016. In October 2019, he was relegated to the club's reserve team alongside 4 other teammates. He left the club at the end of the year.
