= Carsten Rothenbach =

German footballer (born 1980)

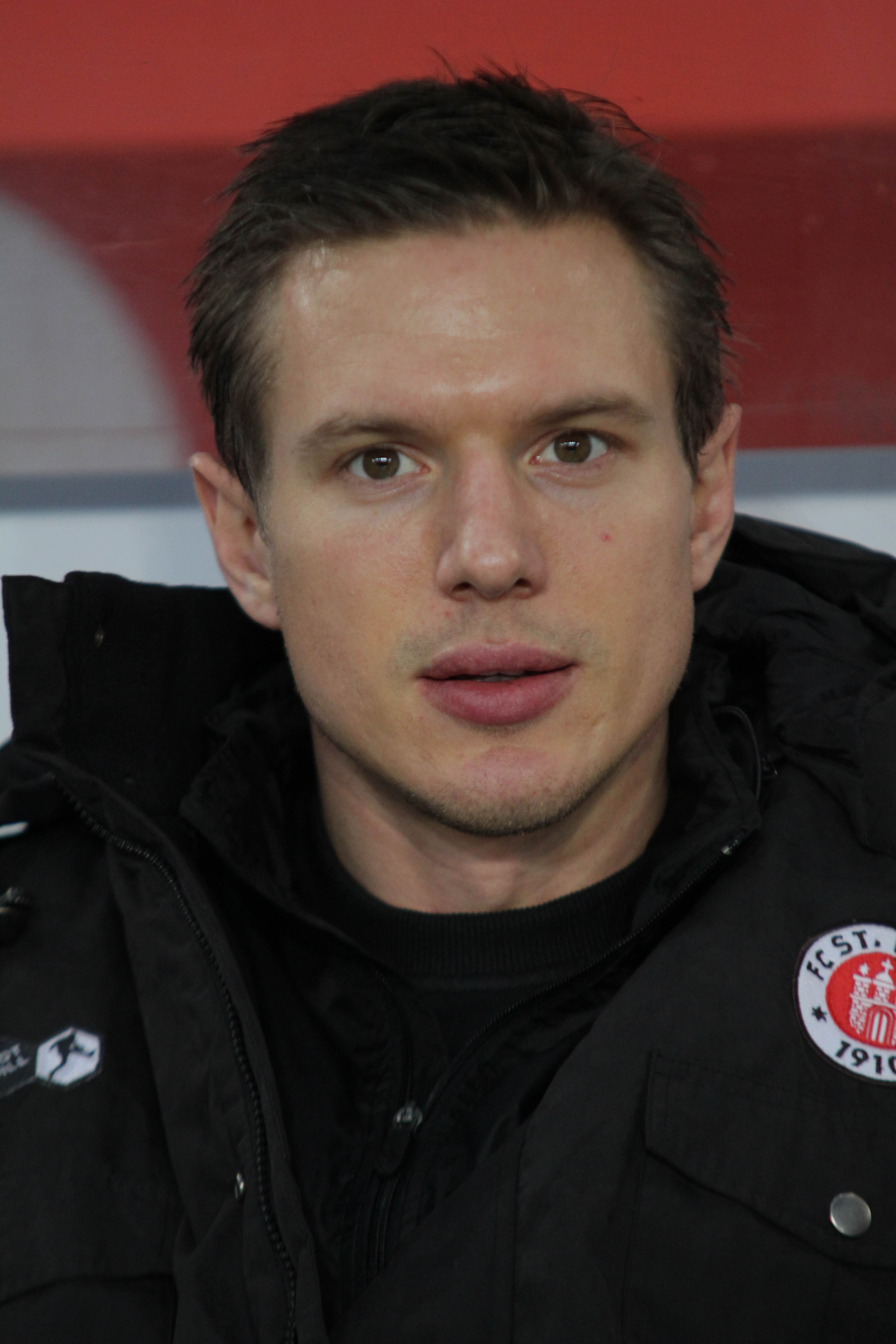
- Rothenbach with St. Pauli in 2012

Personal information
- Date of birth: 3 September 1980 (age 46)
- Place of birth: Heidelberg, West Germany
- Height: 1.85 m (6 ft 1 in)
- Position: Defender

Youth career
- SV Schriesheim
- –1997: FC Dossenheim
- 1997–1999: Karlsruher SC

Senior career*
Years	Team	Apps	(Gls)
1999–2006	Karlsruher SC II	43	(2)
2000–2006	Karlsruher SC	125	(6)
2006–2012	FC St. Pauli	147	(6)
2012	→ FC St. Pauli II	1	(0)
2012–2014	VfL Bochum	27	(0)
2013	→ VfL Bochum II	1	(0)
Total		344	(14)
- * Club domestic league appearances and goals

Carsten Rothenbach (born 3 September 1980) is a German former professional footballer who played as a defender.

== Career ==
Born in Heidelberg, Rothenbach made his professional debut in the 2. Bundesliga for Karlsruher SC on 13 August 2001 when he came on as a substitute in the 78th minute in a game against 1. FC Saarbrücken.

== Career statistics ==
Appearances and goals by club, season and competition
Club	Season	League			DFB-Pokal		Total	
Club	Season	Division	Apps	Goals	Apps	Goals	Apps	Goals
Karlsruher SC II	1999–00	Regionalliga Süd	26	2	—		26	2
Karlsruher SC II	2000–01	Oberliga Baden-Württemberg	3	0	0	0	3	0
Karlsruher SC II	2001–02	Oberliga Baden-Württemberg	2	0	—		2	0
Karlsruher SC II	2002–03	Oberliga Baden-Württemberg	2	0	—		2	0
Karlsruher SC II	2003–04	Oberliga Baden-Württemberg	6	0	—		6	0
Karlsruher SC II	2004–05	Oberliga Baden-Württemberg	2	0	—		2	0
Karlsruher SC II	2005–06	Regionalliga Süd	2	0	—		2	0
Karlsruher SC II	Total		43	2	0	0	43	2
Karlsruher SC	2000–01	Regionalliga Süd	24	1	2	0	26	1
Karlsruher SC	2001–02	2. Bundesliga	19	2	1	0	20	2
Karlsruher SC	2002–03	2. Bundesliga	27	1	1	0	28	1
Karlsruher SC	2003–04	2. Bundesliga	20	0	1	0	21	0
Karlsruher SC	2004–05	2. Bundesliga	15	0	2	0	17	0
Karlsruher SC	2005–06	2. Bundesliga	20	2	2	0	22	2
Karlsruher SC	Total		125	6	9	0	134	6
FC St. Pauli	2006–07	Regionalliga Nord	33	1	1	0	34	1
FC St. Pauli	2007–08	2. Bundesliga	30	3	2	1	32	4
FC St. Pauli	2008–09	2. Bundesliga	26	1	1	0	27	1
FC St. Pauli	2009–10	2. Bundesliga	28	1	2	0	30	1
FC St. Pauli	2010–11	Bundesliga	13	0	0	0	13	0
FC St. Pauli	2011–12	2. Bundesliga	17	0	1	0	18	0
FC St. Pauli	Total		147	6	7	1	154	7
FC St. Pauli II	2011–12	Regionalliga Nord	1	0	—		1	0
VfL Bochum	2012–13	2. Bundesliga	27	0	4	0	31	0
VfL Bochum	2013–14	2. Bundesliga	0	0	0	0	0	0
VfL Bochum	Total		27	0	4	0	31	0
VfL Bochum II	2013–14	Regionalliga West	1	0	—		1	0
Career total			344	14	20	1	364	15
