= Jannik Stevens =

German football defender (born 1992)

Personal information
- Date of birth: 21 July 1992 (age 34)
- Height: 1.76 m (5 ft 9 in)
- Position: Defender

Team information
- Current team: SV Straelen
- Number: 7

Youth career
- 2000–2011: Borussia Möchengladbach

Senior career*
Years	Team	Apps	(Gls)
2011–2013	VfL Bochum II	61	(0)
2012–2013	VfL Bochum	2	(0)
2013–2015	Alemannia Aachen	25	(1)
2014	Alemannia Aachen II	3	(1)
2015	Eintracht Trier	13	(0)
2017–	SV Straelen		
- * Club domestic league appearances and goals

Jannik Stevens (born 21 July 1992) is a German footballer who plays as a defender for SV Straelen.

== Career statistics ==
As of 22 May 2013

Appearances and goals by club, season and competition
Club	Season	League			DFB-Pokal		Total	
Club	Season	Division	Apps	Goals	Apps	Goals	Apps	Goals
VfL Bochum II	2011–12	Regionalliga West	26	0	—		26	0
VfL Bochum II	2012–13	Regionalliga West	35	0	—		35	0
VfL Bochum II	Total		61	0	0	0	61	0
VfL Bochum	2011–12	2. Bundesliga	2	0	0	0	2	0
VfL Bochum	2012–13	2. Bundesliga	0	0	0	0	0	0
VfL Bochum	Total		2	0	0	0	2	0
Alemannia Aachen	2013–14	Regionalliga West	2	0	—		2	0
Career total			65	0	0	0	65	0
