= Sören Bertram =

German footballer

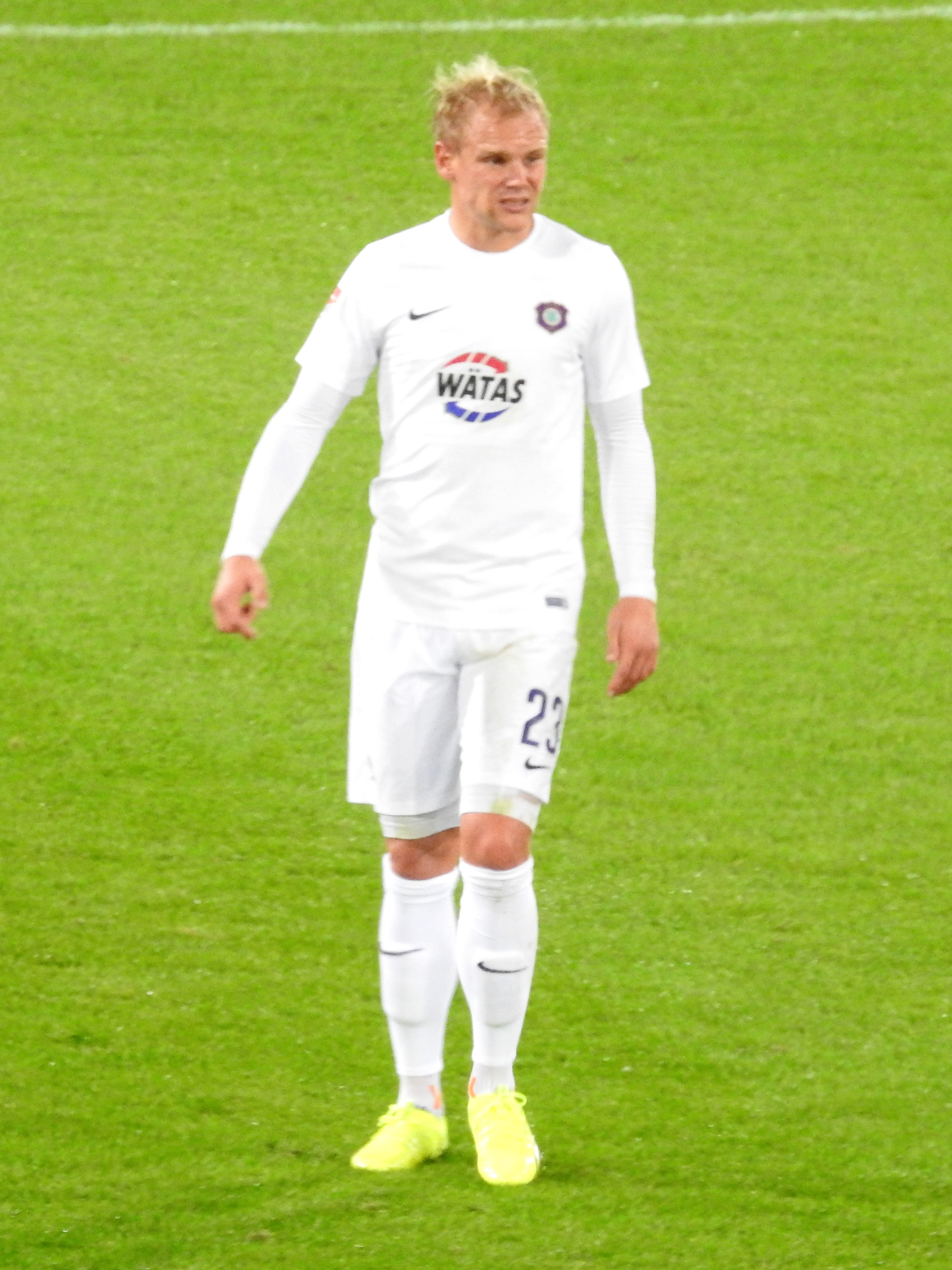
- Bertram in 2017

Personal information
- Date of birth: 5 June 1991 (age 35)
- Place of birth: Uelzen, Germany
- Height: 1.80 m (5 ft 11 in)
- Position: Winger

Youth career
- 1995–2002: Teutonia Uelzen
- 2002–2005: FC St. Pauli
- 2005–2009: Hamburger SV

Senior career*
Years	Team	Apps	(Gls)
2009–2012	Hamburger SV II	40	(7)
2010–2012	Hamburger SV	2	(0)
2010–2011	→ FC Augsburg (loan)	17	(1)
2012–2014	VfL Bochum II	13	(3)
2012–2014	VfL Bochum	3	(0)
2013–2014	→ Hallescher FC (loan)	36	(11)
2014–2016	Hallescher FC	60	(11)
2016–2019	Erzgebirge Aue	42	(4)
2019	Darmstadt 98	9	(1)
2019–2021	1. FC Magdeburg	65	(14)
2021–2023	VfL Osnabrück	24	(2)
Total		311	(54)

International career
2008–2009	Germany U18	15	(0)
2009–2010	Germany U19	6	(1)
2011	Germany U20	1	(0)
- * Club domestic league appearances and goals

Sören Bertram (born 5 June 1991) is a German former professional footballer who played as a winger.

== Career ==
In January 2019, Bertram joined 2. Bundesliga side Darmstadt 98 from league rivals Erzgebirge Aue having agreed a 1.5-year contract.

In June 2024, after a two-year break through injury, Bertram announced his retirement from playing.

== Career statistics ==
As of 1 August 2020

Appearances and goals by club, season and competition
Club	Season	League			Cup		Continental		Other		Total	
Club	Season	Division	Apps	Goals	Apps	Goals	Apps	Goals	Apps	Goals	Apps	Goals
Hamburger SV II	2009–10	Regionalliga Nord	14	1	—		—		—		14	1
Hamburger SV II	2010–11	Regionalliga Nord	1	1	—		—		—		1	1
Hamburger SV II	2011–12	Regionalliga Nord	25	5	—		—		—		25	5
Hamburger SV II	Total		40	7	0	0	0	0	0	0	40	7
Hamburger SV	2009–10	Bundesliga	2	0	0	0	1	0	—		3	0
FC Augsburg	2010–11	2. Bundesliga	17	1	1	0	—		—		18	1
VfL Bochum II	2012–13	Regionalliga West	13	3	—		—		—		13	3
VfL Bochum	2012–13	2. Bundesliga	3	0	0	0	—		—		3	0
Hallescher FC	2013–14	3. Liga	36	11	0	0	—		—		36	11
Hallescher FC	2014–15	3. Liga	27	2	0	0	—		—		27	2
Hallescher FC	2015–16	3. Liga	33	9	1	0	—		—		34	9
Hallescher FC	Total		96	22	1	0	0	0	0	0	97	22
Erzgebirge Aue	2016–17	2. Bundesliga	8	0	0	0	—		—		8	0
Erzgebirge Aue	2017–18	2. Bundesliga	23	4	0	0	0	0	2	3	25	7
Erzgebirge Aue	2018–19	2. Bundesliga	11	0	1	0	—		—		12	0
Erzgebirge Aue	Total		42	4	1	0	0	0	2	3	45	7
Darmstadt 98	2018–19	2. Bundesliga	9	1	0	0	—		—		9	1
1. FC Magdeburg	2019–20	3. Liga	34	10	1	0	—		—		35	10
Career total			256	48	4	0	1	0	2	3	263	51
