= Lukas Sinkiewicz =

German international footballer (born 1985)

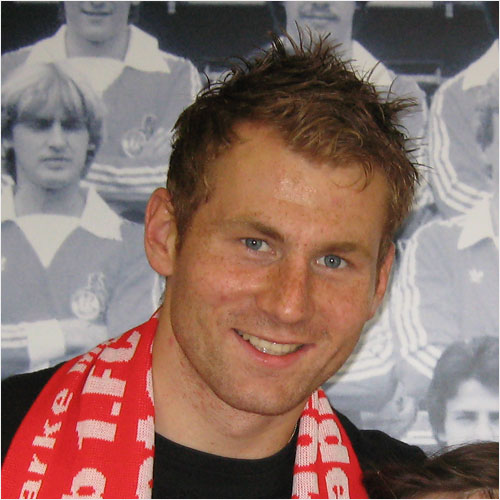
- Sinkiewicz with Köln in 2007

Personal information
- Date of birth: 9 October 1985 (age 41)
- Place of birth: Tychy, Poland
- Height: 1.92 m (6 ft 4 in)
- Positions: Defensive midfielder; centre-back

Youth career
- 1990–1991: FC Flerzheim
- 1991–1993: VfL Rheinbach
- 1993–1996: 1. FC Quadrath-Ichendorf
- 1996–2003: 1. FC Köln

Senior career*
Years	Team	Apps	(Gls)
2003–2004	1. FC Köln II	2	(0)
2003–2007	1. FC Köln	76	(1)
2007–2010	Bayer 04 Leverkusen	39	(2)
2009–2007	→ Bayer 04 Leverkusen II	2	(0)
2010–2011	FC Augsburg	10	(1)
2011–2014	VfL Bochum	41	(2)
2012–2013	→ VfL Bochum II	2	(0)
2014–2015	Jahn Regensburg	9	(0)
2019–2022	SV Lövenich/Widdersdorf	14	(3)
Total		195	(9)

International career
2004	Germany U-19	8	(0)
2004–2006	Germany U-21	9	(0)
2005	Germany	3	(0)

Managerial career
- 2018–2022: Fortuna Düsseldorf II (assistant)
- 2022–2023: Bonner SC
- 2024: SV Bergisch Gladbach 09
Medal record
Bayer 04 Leverkusen
Runner-up	DFB-Pokal	2008–09
FC Augsburg
Runner-up	2. Bundesliga	2010–11
- * Club domestic league appearances and goals as of 11 February 2021

Lukas Sinkiewicz (born 9 October 1985) is a former professional footballer who played as a defensive midfielder or centre-back. He last played for SSV Jahn Regensburg. He represented Germany on three occasions.

== Career ==
He signed a one-year contract with FC Augsburg in summer 2010, moving from Bayer 04 Leverkusen where he played between 2007 and 2010. Previously he played for 1. FC Köln. After his year in Augsburg he was part of the squads of VfL Bochum and SSV Jahn Regensburg before retiring in 2015.

=== Statistics ===
As of 4 April 2015

Club performance			League		Cup		Continental		Total	
Season	Club	League	Apps	Goals	Apps	Goals	Apps	Goals	Apps	Goals
Germany			League		DFB-Pokal		Europe		Total	
2003–04	Köln II	Regionalliga Nord	2	0	—		—		2	0
2003–04	Köln	Bundesliga	4	0	0	0	—		4	0
2004–05	Köln	2. Bundesliga	26	1	2	0	—		28	1
2005–06	Köln	Bundesliga	33	0	1	0	—		34	0
2006–07	Köln	2. Bundesliga	13	0	0	0	—		13	0
2007–08	Leverkusen	Bundesliga	19	2	0	0	6	0	25	2
2008–09	Leverkusen	Bundesliga	13	0	3	0	—		16	0
2009–10	Leverkusen	Bundesliga	7	0	0	0	—		7	0
2009–10	Leverkusen II	Regionalliga West	2	0	—		—		2	0
2010–11	Augsburg	2. Bundesliga	10	1	1	1	—		11	2
2011–12	Bochum	2. Bundesliga	15	0	2	0	—		17	0
2012–13	Bochum	2. Bundesliga	22	2	4	0	—		26	2
2013–14	Bochum	2. Bundesliga	4	0	0	0	—		4	0
2011–12	Bochum II	Regionalliga West	1	0	—		—		1	0
2012–13	Bochum II	Regionalliga West	0	0	—		—		0	0
2013–14	Bochum II	Regionalliga West	1	0	—		—		1	0
2014–15	Jahn Regensburg	3. Liga	9	0	—		—		9	0
Total	Germany		181	6	13	1	6	0	200	7
Career total			181	6	13	1	6	0	200	7

== International career ==
Sinkiewicz played three matches for the German national team, all in 2005.

He also represented Germany's U-19 team at the 2004 UEFA European Under-19 Championship and the U-21 squad at the 2006 UEFA European Under-21 Championship.
