= Yusuke Tasaka =

Japanese footballer (born 1985)

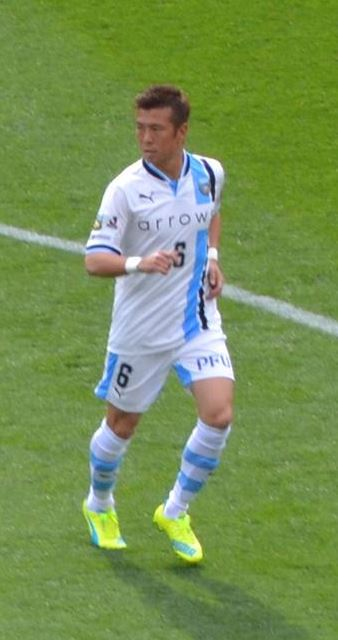

Personal information
- Full name: Yusuke Tasaka
- Date of birth: 8 July 1985 (age 41)
- Place of birth: Hiroshima, Japan
- Height: 1.72 m (5 ft 8 in)
- Position: Midfielder

Youth career
- 2000–2003: Sanfrecce Hiroshima Youth
- 2004–2007: Aoyama Gakuin University

Senior career*
Years	Team	Apps	(Gls)
2007–2012	Kawasaki Frontale	105	(11)
2012–2015	VfL Bochum	81	(9)
2015–2018	Kawasaki Frontale	51	(4)
2019–2020	JEF United Chiba	18	(0)
Medal record
Kawasaki Frontale
Winner	J1 League	2017
Winner	J1 League	2018
Runner-up	J1 League	2008
Runner-up	J1 League	2009
Runner-up	J.League Cup	2007
Runner-up	J.League Cup	2009
Runner-up	J.League Cup	2017
Runner-up	Emperor's Cup	2016
- * Club domestic league appearances and goals as of 22 December 2020

Yusuke Tasaka (田坂 祐介, Tasaka Yusuke; born 8 July 1985) is a Japanese professional football midfielder.

== Career ==
Born in Hiroshima, Hiroshima, Tasaka began his career with hometown side Sanfrecce Hiroshima. He was a regular in the academy sides and won the 2003 J-League Youth Cup alongside the likes of Yojiro Takahagi and Issei Takayanagi. After graduating high school Tasaka received an offer from first team, but he decided to continue his study and play football at the Aoyama Gakuin University.

Upon graduating university Tasaka joined Kawasaki Frontale in 2007 and inherited jersey number 6. He made his J-League debut in a 4–0 defeat against Kashiwa Reysol on 23 September 2007.

Tasaka left Kawasaki to sign for VfL Bochum on 24 July 2012. He made his Bochum debut against Dynamo Dresden in the 2. Bundesliga on 12 August 2012.

== Career statistics ==
As of 23 February 2017

Club	Season	League		Cup^{1}		League Cup^{2}		Continental^{3}		Total	
Club	Season	Apps	Goals	Apps	Goals	Apps	Goals	Apps	Goals	Apps	Goals
Kawasaki Frontale	2007	1	0	0	0	0	0	0	0	1	0
Kawasaki Frontale	2008	12	1	1	0	3	0	—		16	1
Kawasaki Frontale	2009	24	2	3	0	3	0	3	0	33	2
Kawasaki Frontale	2010	27	3	1	0	4	1	6	1	38	5
Kawasaki Frontale	2011	25	2	3	2	4	1	—		32	5
Kawasaki Frontale	2012	16	3	0	0	6	1	—		22	4
Kawasaki Frontale	Total	105	11	8	2	20	3	9	1	142	17
VfL Bochum	2012–13	28	3	2	0	—		—		30	3
VfL Bochum	2013–14	31	3	2	0	—		—		33	3
VfL Bochum	2014–15	22	3	2	0	—		—		24	3
VfL Bochum	Total	81	9	6	0	0	0	0	0	87	9
Kawasaki Frontale	2015	12	3	3	0	–		–		15	3
Kawasaki Frontale	2016	18	1	5	1	5	0	–		28	2
Kawasaki Frontale	Total	30	4	8	1	5	0	0	0	0	0
Career total		216	24	22	3	25	3	9	1	272	31

^{1}Includes Emperor's Cup and DFB-Pokal.

^{2}Includes J. League Cup.

^{3}Includes AFC Champions League.
