= Florian Brügmann =

German footballer (born 1991)

Personal information
- Date of birth: 23 January 1991 (age 35)
- Place of birth: Hamburg, Germany
- Height: 1.73 m (5 ft 8 in)
- Position: Right-back

Team information
- Current team: Chemie Leipzig
- Number: 2

Youth career
- 1994–2005: SSV Güster
- 2005–2008: Hansa Rostock
- 2008–2010: Hamburger SV

Senior career*
Years	Team	Apps	(Gls)
2009–2012	Hamburger SV II	62	(4)
2012–2013	VfL Bochum II	5	(0)
2012–2013	VfL Bochum	6	(1)
2013–2017	Hallescher FC	111	(2)
2017–2019	Carl Zeiss Jena	59	(1)
2019	MSV Duisburg	6	(0)
2020–2021	Energie Cottbus	13	(2)
2021–	Chemie Leipzig	106	(6)

International career
2006	Germany U-16	2	(0)
2008	Germany U-17	2	(0)
- * Club domestic league appearances and goals as of 1 January 2025

Florian Brügmann (born 23 January 1991) is a German footballer who plays as a right-back for Chemie Leipzig.

== Career ==
Having come through the youth ranks of Hansa Rostock and Hamburger SV, Brügmann played for VfL Bochum.

From 2013 till summer 2017 he was contracted to Hallescher FC, making 111 appearances with 2 goals.

In August 2017, out-of-contract Brügmann joined FC Carl Zeiss Jena on a two-year contract. He left the club at the end of the 2018–19 season.

On 29 July 2019, he signed for MSV Duisburg. His contract was terminated on 3 January 2020 and he signed with Energie Cottbus.

== Career statistics ==
As of 3 January 2020

Appearances and goals by club, season and competition
Club	Season	League			Cup		Total	
Club	Season	Division	Apps	Goals	Apps	Goals	Apps	Goals
Hamburger SV II	2009–10	Regionalliga Nord	5	0	—		5	0
Hamburger SV II	2010–11	Regionalliga Nord	27	1	—		27	1
Hamburger SV II	2011–12	Regionalliga Nord	30	3	—		30	3
Hamburger SV II	Total		62	4	0	0	62	4
VfL Bochum II	2012–13	Regionalliga West	5	0	—		5	0
VfL Bochum	2012–13	2. Bundesliga	6	1	2	0	8	1
Hallescher FC	2013–14	3. Liga	32	0	—		32	0
Hallescher FC	2014–15	3. Liga	25	0	—		25	0
Hallescher FC	2015–16	3. Liga	25	1	1	0	26	1
Hallescher FC	2016–17	3. Liga	29	1	2	0	31	1
Hallescher FC	Total		111	2	3	0	114	2
Carl Zeiss Jena	2017–18	3. Liga	32	1	0	0	32	1
Carl Zeiss Jena	2018–19	3. Liga	27	0	1	0	28	0
Carl Zeiss Jena	Total		59	1	1	0	60	1
MSV Duisburg	2019–20	3. Liga	6	0	0	0	6	0
Career total			249	8	6	0	255	8
