= List of German football transfers summer 2015 =

This is a list of German football transfers in the summer transfer window 2015 by club. Only transfers of the Bundesliga, and 2. Bundesliga are included.

== Bundesliga ==
Note: Flags indicate national team as has been defined under FIFA eligibility rules. Players may hold more than one non-FIFA nationality.

=== FC Bayern Munich ===
In:

No.	Pos.	Nation	Player
11	MF	BRA	Douglas Costa (from FC Shakhtar Donetsk)
15	DF	GER	Jan Kirchhoff (loan return from FC Schalke 04)
23	MF	CHI	Arturo Vidal (from Juventus FC)
26	GK	GER	Sven Ulreich (from VfB Stuttgart)
29	MF	FRA	Kingsley Coman (on loan from Juventus FC)
32	MF	GER	Joshua Kimmich (from VfB Stuttgart)
33	GK	AUT	Ivan Lučić (from FC Bayern München II)
37	MF	USA	Julian Green (loan return from Hamburger SV)
-	MF	DEN	Pierre-Emile Højbjerg (loan return from FC Augsburg)

Out:

No.	Pos.	Nation	Player
4	DF	BRA	Dante (to VfL Wolfsburg)
14	FW	PER	Claudio Pizarro (to Werder Bremen)
23	GK	ESP	Pepe Reina (to S.S.C. Napoli)
30	MF	GER	Mitchell Weiser (to Hertha BSC)
31	MF	GER	Bastian Schweinsteiger (to Manchester United F.C.)
34	MF	DEN	Pierre-Emile Højbjerg (on loan to FC Schalke 04)
--	MF	SUI	Xherdan Shaqiri (to Inter Milan, previously on loan)

=== VfL Wolfsburg ===
In:

No.	Pos.	Nation	Player
6	DF	PER	Carlos Ascues (from FBC Melgar)
10	MF	GER	Julian Draxler (from FC Schalke 04)
11	FW	GER	Max Kruse (from Borussia Mönchengladbach)
18	DF	BRA	Dante (from FC Bayern Munich)
28	GK	BEL	Koen Casteels (loan return from Werder Bremen)
32	FW	POL	Oskar Zawada (from VfL Wolfsburg II)
33	FW	GER	Sebastian Stolze (from VfL Wolfsburg II)
35	MF	SUI	Francisco Rodríguez (from FC Zürich)
38	MF	BEL	Ismail Azzaoui (from Tottenham Hotspur)

Out:

No.	Pos.	Nation	Player
9	MF	CRO	Ivan Perišić (to Inter Milan)
10	MF	GER	Aaron Hunt (to Hamburger SV)
14	MF	BEL	Kevin De Bruyne (to Manchester City F.C.)
21	GK	GER	Patrick Drewes (on loan to FC Wil 1900)
29	MF	CHN	Zhang Xizhe (to Beijing Guoan F.C.)
--	MF	CZE	Václav Pilař (to FC Viktoria Plzeň, previously on loan)
--	DF	GER	Bjarne Thoelke (to Karlsruher SC, previously at VfL Wolfsburg II)
--	DF	GER	Dan-Patrick Poggenberg (to MSV Duisburg, previously on loan at Chemnitzer FC)
--	FW	GER	Stefan Kutschke (to 1. FC Nürnberg, previously on loan at SC Paderborn 07)

=== Borussia Mönchengladbach ===
In:

No.	Pos.	Nation	Player
3	DF	DEN	Andreas Christensen (on loan from Chelsea F.C.)
9	FW	SUI	Josip Drmić (from Bayer Leverkusen)
10	MF	BEL	Thorgan Hazard (from Chelsea F.C., previously on loan)
13	MF	GER	Lars Stindl (from Hannover 96)
14	DF	GER	Nico Schulz (from Hertha BSC)
21	GK	GER	Tobias Sippel (from 1. FC Kaiserslautern)
30	DF	SUI	Nico Elvedi (from FC Zürich)
--	MF	GER	Amin Younes (loan return from 1. FC Kaiserslautern)

Out:

No.	Pos.	Nation	Player
3	DF	BEL	Filip Daems (to KVC Westerlo)
10	FW	GER	Max Kruse (to VfL Wolfsburg)
14	MF	GER	Thorben Marx (retired)
14	MF	GER	Amin Younes (to AFC Ajax)
20	DF	GER	Nico Brandenburger (on loan to FC Luzern)
21	GK	GER	Janis Blaswich (on loan to Dynamo Dresden)
23	MF	GER	Christoph Kramer (loan return to Bayer Leverkusen)
--	FW	GER	Peniel Mlapa (to VfL Bochum, previously on loan at 1. FC Nürnberg)

=== Bayer 04 Leverkusen ===
In:

No.	Pos.	Nation	Player
2	DF	BRA	André Ramalho (from RB Salzburg)
4	DF	GER	Jonathan Tah (from Hamburger SV)
5	DF	GRE	Kyriakos Papadopoulos (from FC Schalke 04, previously on loan)
7	FW	MEX	Javier Hernández (from Manchester United F.C.)
14	FW	SUI	Admir Mehmedi (from SC Freiburg)
20	MF	CHI	Charles Aránguiz (from Sport Club Internacional)
23	MF	GER	Christoph Kramer (loan return from Borussia Mönchengladbach)
24	FW	KOR	Ryu Seung-woo (loan return from Eintracht Braunschweig)
33	DF	GER	Lukas Boeder (from Bayer Leverkusen youth)
34	DF	GER	Robin Becker (from Bayer Leverkusen youth)
39	MF	GER	Benjamin Henrichs (from Bayer Leverkusen youth)
44	MF	SVN	Kevin Kampl (from Borussia Dortmund)
--	FW	GER	Marc Brašnić (from Bayer Leverkusen youth)
--	DF	GRE	Kostas Stafylidis (loan return from Fulham F.C.)

Out:

No.	Pos.	Nation	Player
3	DF	GER	Stefan Reinartz (to Eintracht Frankfurt)
3	DF	GRE	Kostas Stafylidis (to FC Augsburg)
5	DF	BIH	Emir Spahić (to Hamburger SV)
7	MF	KOR	Son Heung-min (to Tottenham Hotspur F.C.)
9	FW	SUI	Josip Drmić (to Borussia Mönchengladbach)
27	MF	GER	Gonzalo Castro (to Borussia Dortmund)
27	MF	AUS	Robbie Kruse (on loan to VfB Stuttgart)
--	DF	GER	Philipp Wollscheid (to Stoke City, previously on loan)
--	FW	POL	Arkadiusz Milik (to AFC Ajax, previously on loan)
--	DF	GER	Dennis Engelman (to Fortuna Köln, previously on loan)
--	GK	GER	Niklas Lomb (on loan to Preußen Münster, previously on loan at Hallescher FC)
--	FW	GER	Maximilian Wagener (on loan to 1. FSV Mainz 05 II, previously on loan at VfL Osnabrück)
--	DF	GER	Dominik Kohr (to FC Augsburg, previously on loan)
--	FW	GER	Marc Brašnić (on loan to SC Paderborn 07)

=== FC Augsburg ===
In:

No.	Pos.	Nation	Player
3	DF	GRE	Kostas Stafylidis (from Bayer 04 Leverkusen)
4	DF	GHA	Daniel Opare (from FC Porto)
15	MF	GER	Piotr Trochowski (free agent)
19	MF	KOR	Koo Ja-cheol (from 1. FSV Mainz 05)
21	MF	GER	Dominik Kohr (from Bayer Leverkusen, previously on loan)
26	FW	GER	Bastian Kurz (from FC Augsburg youth)
28	GK	GER	Yannik Oettl (from SpVgg Unterhaching)
31	DF	GER	Philipp Max (from Karlsruher SC)
--	DF	GER	Ronny Philp (loan return from SpVgg Greuther Fürth)

Out:

No.	Pos.	Nation	Player
3	DF	GER	Ronny Philp (to 1. FC Heidenheim)
4	DF	GER	Dominik Reinhardt (released)
12	DF	GHA	Baba Rahman (to Chelsea F.C.)
19	MF	DEN	Pierre-Emile Højbjerg (loan return to Bayern Munich)
34	FW	SRB	Nikola Đurđić (on loan to Malmö FF)
--	FW	GER	Mathias Fetsch (to Dynamo Dresden, previously on loan)

=== FC Schalke 04 ===
In:

No.	Pos.	Nation	Player
3	DF	BRA	Júnior Caiçara (from PFC Ludogorets Razgrad)
5	MF	GER	Johannes Geis (from 1. FSV Mainz 05)
9	FW	ARG	Franco Di Santo (from SV Werder Bremen)
20	DF	GER	Thilo Kehrer (from FC Schalke 04 youth)
23	MF	DEN	Pierre-Emile Højbjerg (on loan from Bayern Munich)
27	DF	GER	Sascha Riether (from SC Freiburg)
28	DF	BRA	Felipe Santana (loan return from Olympiacos F.C.)
30	GK	AUT	Michael Gspurning (from FC Schalke 04 II)
31	DF	SRB	Matija Nastasić (from Manchester City F.C., previously on loan)
35	GK	GER	Alexander Nübel (from SC Paderborn 07)
36	MF	GER	Felix Platte (from FC Schalke 04 youth)
--	MF	GER	Felix Schröter (from FC Schalke 04 II)
--	MF	GER	Maurice Multhaup (from FC Schalke 04 youth)

Out:

No.	Pos.	Nation	Player
3	DF	GER	Jan Kirchhoff (loan return to Bayern Munich)
10	MF	GER	Julian Draxler (to Vfl Wolfsburg)
16	MF	GER	Maurice Multhaup (to FC Ingolstadt 04)
17	MF	PER	Jefferson Farfán (to Al Jazira Club)
20	MF	NGA	Chinedu Obasi (released)
23	DF	AUT	Christian Fuchs (to Leicester City F.C.)
27	MF	SUI	Tranquillo Barnetta (to Philadelphia Union)
28	GK	GER	Christian Wetklo (to FC Schalke 04 II)
37	DF	GER	Pascal Itter (to SV Grödig)
38	MF	GER	Marcel Sobottka (to Fortuna Düsseldorf)
40	GK	GER	Timon Wellenreuther (on loan to RCD Mallorca)
--	DF	GRE	Kyriakos Papadopoulos (to Bayer Leverkusen, previously on loan)
--	MF	GER	Felix Schröter (on loan to 1. FC Heidenheim)

=== Borussia Dortmund ===
In:

No.	Pos.	Nation	Player
3	DF	KOR	Park Joo-ho (from 1. FSV Mainz 05)
7	MF	GER	Jonas Hofmann (loan return from 1. FSV Mainz 05)
9	FW	BEL	Adnan Januzaj (on loan from Manchester United F.C.)
14	MF	GER	Moritz Leitner (loan return from VfB Stuttgart)
27	MF	GER	Gonzalo Castro (from Bayer 04 Leverkusen)
33	MF	GER	Julian Weigl (from TSV 1860 München)
34	FW	GER	Marvin Ducksch (loan return from SC Paderborn 07)
38	GK	SUI	Roman Bürki (from SC Freiburg)

Out:

No.	Pos.	Nation	Player
5	MF	GER	Sebastian Kehl (retired)
9	FW	ITA	Ciro Immobile (on loan to Sevilla F.C.)
14	MF	SRB	Miloš Jojić (to 1. FC Köln)
16	MF	POL	Jakub Błaszczykowski (on loan to ACF Fiorentina)
19	MF	GER	Kevin Großkreutz (to Galatasaray S.K.)
21	MF	GER	Oliver Kirch (to SC Paderborn 07)
22	GK	AUS	Mitchell Langerak (to VfB Stuttgart)
24	DF	GER	Marian Sarr (to Borussia Dortmund II)
33	GK	GER	Zlatan Alomerović (to 1. FC Kaiserslautern)
40	MF	GER	Jeremy Dudziak (to FC St. Pauli)
41	MF	AUS	Mustafa Amini (to Randers FC)
44	MF	SVN	Kevin Kampl (to Bayer Leverkusen)

=== 1899 Hoffenheim ===
In:

No.	Pos.	Nation	Player
3	MF	CZE	Pavel Kadeřábek (from Sparta Praha)
5	DF	SUI	Fabian Schär (from FC Basel)
9	MF	CHI	Eduardo Vargas (from S.S.C. Napoli)
10	MF	FRA	Jonathan Schmid (from SC Freiburg)
11	FW	SWE	Jiloan Hamad (loan return from Standard Liège)
19	FW	GER	Mark Uth (from SC Heerenveen)
21	DF	GER	Nicolai Rapp (from 1899 Hoffenheim youth)
22	FW	GER	Kevin Kurányi (from FC Dynamo Moscow)
30	FW	GER	Philipp Ochs (from 1899 Hoffenheim youth)
34	DF	GER	Benedikt Gimber (from 1899 Hoffenheim youth)
40	FW	BRA	Joelinton (from Sport Club do Recife)
--	MF	SRB	Filip Malbašić (loan return from Lechia Gdańsk)
--	FW	GER	Joshua Mees (from 1899 Hoffenheim youth)
--	FW	CRO	Antonio Čolak (from 1. FC Nürnberg)
--	GK	CRO	Marko Marić (from SK Rapid Wien)
--	FW	BRA	Felipe Pires (from FC Red Bull Salzburg)
--	FW	KOR	In-hyeok Park (from Kyung Hee University)
--	MF	LIE	Sandro Wieser (loan return from FC Aarau)

Out:

No.	Pos.	Nation	Player
2	DF	GER	Andreas Beck (to Beşiktaş J.K.)
9	FW	GER	Sven Schipplock (to Hamburger SV)
10	MF	BRA	Roberto Firmino (to Liverpool F.C.)
19	DF	ARG	David Abraham (to Eintracht Frankfurt)
21	DF	GER	Kevin Akpoguma (on loan to Fortuna Düsseldorf)
23	MF	BIH	Sejad Salihović (to Guizhou Renhe F.C.)
26	FW	GER	Janik Haberer (on loan to VfL Bochum)
27	FW	FRA	Anthony Modeste (to 1.FC Köln)
27	MF	LIE	Sandro Wieser (to FC Thun)
29	FW	GER	Joshua Mees (on loan to SC Freiburg)
35	GK	GER	Marvin Schwäbe (on loan to VfL Osnabrück)
36	MF	GER	Grischa Prömel (to Karlsruher SC)
--	DF	PER	Luis Advíncula (to Bursaspor, previously on loan at Vitória F.C.)
--	FW	AUT	Michael Gregoritsch (to VfL Bochum, previously on loan)
--	MF	ITA	Vincenzo Grifo (to SC Freiburg, previously on loan at FSV Frankfurt)
--	MF	GER	Tobias Weis (to VfL Bochum, previously on loan)
--	MF	GHA	Afriyie Acquah (to Torino F.C., previously on loan at U.C. Sampdoria)
--	FW	CRO	Antonio Čolak (on loan to 1. FC Kaiserslautern)
--	GK	CRO	Marko Marić (on loan to Lechia Gdańsk)
--	FW	BRA	Felipe Pires (on loan to FSV Frankfurt)
--	FW	KOR	In-hyeok Park (on loan to FSV Frankfurt)
--	DF	AUT	Christoph Martschinko (on loan to FK Austria Wien, previously on loan at SV Grödig)
--	FW	PER	Júnior Ponce (on loan to Club Deportivo Universidad de San Martín de Porres, previously on loan at Vitória F.C.)

=== Eintracht Frankfurt ===
In:

No.	Pos.	Nation	Player
1	GK	FIN	Lukáš Hrádecký (from Brøndby IF)
7	MF	GER	Stefan Reinartz (from Bayer 04 Leverkusen)
10	FW	CZE	Václav Kadlec (loan return from AC Sparta Prague)
11	FW	SRB	Mijat Gaćinović (from FK Vojvodina)
13	GK	AUT	Heinz Lindner (from FK Austria Wien)
19	DF	ARG	David Abraham (from TSG 1899 Hoffenheim)
30	FW	NED	Luc Castaignos (from FC Twente)
33	FW	GER	Enis Bunjaki (from Eintracht Frankfurt youth)

Out:

No.	Pos.	Nation	Player
1	GK	GER	Kevin Trapp (to Paris Saint-Germain)
3	FW	GAM	Yusupha Yaffa (released)
7	MF	GER	Jan Rosenthal (to SV Darmstadt 98, previously on loan)
8	MF	JPN	Takashi Inui (to SD Eibar)
9	FW	CAN	Olivier Occéan (to Odds BK, previously on loan)
11	FW	PAR	Nelson Valdez (to Seattle Sounders FC)
19	FW	BRA	Lucas Piazon (loan return to Chelsea F.C.)
30	GK	GER	Felix Wiedwald (to Werder Bremen)
39	DF	GER	Alexander Madlung (released, later to Fortuna Düsseldorf)

=== Werder Bremen ===
In:

No.	Pos.	Nation	Player
9	FW	USA	Aron Johannsson (from AZ Alkmaar)
14	FW	PER	Claudio Pizarro (free agent)
15	DF	CRO	Mateo Pavlović (loan return from Ferencvárosi TC)
19	DF	GER	Luca-Milan Zander (from SV Werder Bremen II)
20	DF	SUI	Ulisses Garcia (from Grasshopper Club Zürich)
21	FW	NGA	Anthony Ujah (from 1. FC Köln)
25	DF	GER	Oliver Hüsing (loan return from F.C. Hansa Rostock)
27	MF	AUT	Florian Grillitsch (from SV Werder Bremen II)
42	GK	GER	Felix Wiedwald (from Eintracht Frankfurt)

Out:

No.	Pos.	Nation	Player
3	DF	ITA	Luca Caldirola (on loan to SV Darmstadt 98)
6	MF	COD	Cédric Makiadi (to Çaykur Rizespor)
9	FW	ARG	Franco Di Santo (to FC Schalke 04)
14	MF	BIH	Izet Hajrović (on loan to SD Eibar)
15	DF	AUT	Sebastian Prödl (to Watford F.C.)
20	GK	BEL	Koen Casteels (loan return to VfL Wolfsburg)
27	FW	GER	Davie Selke (to RB Leipzig)
40	GK	GER	Raif Husić (to SV Werder Bremen II)
--	GK	AUT	Richard Strebinger (to SK Rapid Wien, previously on loan at SSV Jahn Regensburg)
--	FW	GER	Nils Petersen (to SC Freiburg, previously on loan)
--	FW	GER	Martin Kobylański (to Werder Bremen II, previously on loan at 1. FC Union Berlin)
--	FW	NED	Eljero Elia (to Feyenoord, previously on loan at Southampton F.C.)
--	MF	POL	Ludovic Obraniak (to Maccabi Haifa F.C., previously on loan at Çaykur Rizespor)

=== 1. FSV Mainz 05 ===
In:

No.	Pos.	Nation	Player
3	DF	NGA	Leon Balogun (from SV Darmstadt 98)
4	MF	GER	Suat Serdar (from 1.FSV Mainz 05 youth)
5	DF	POR	Henrique Sereno (from Kayserispor)
6	MF	GER	Danny Latza (from VfL Bochum)
9	MF	JPN	Yoshinori Mutō (from FC Tokyo)
11	MF	GER	Maximilian Beister (from Hamburger SV)
15	FW	COL	Jhon Córdoba (on loan from Granada CF)
20	MF	SUI	Fabian Frei (from FC Basel)
23	GK	ITA	Gianluca Curci (from A.S. Roma)
24	MF	FRA	Gaëtan Bussmann (from FC Metz)
25	MF	DEN	Niki Zimling (loan return from AFC Ajax)
31	FW	GER	Florian Niederlechner (from 1. FC Heidenheim)
--	MF	GER	Besar Halimi (from Stuttgarter Kickers)

Out:

No.	Pos.	Nation	Player
1	GK	GRE	Stefanos Kapino (to Olympiacos F.C.)
4	DF	MKD	Nikolče Noveski (released)
5	DF	GER	Benedikt Saller (to 1. FSV Mainz 05 II)
6	MF	GER	Johannes Geis (to FC Schalke 04)
9	FW	TUN	Sami Allagui (loan return to Hertha BSC)
13	MF	KOR	Koo Ja-cheol (to FC Augsburg)
20	DF	CRC	Júnior Díaz (to SV Darmstadt 98)
22	FW	CHI	Nicolás Castillo (loan return to Club Brugge KV)
23	FW	JPN	Shinji Okazaki (to Leicester City F.C.)
24	DF	KOR	Park Joo-ho (to Borussia Dortmund)
31	MF	GER	Jonas Hofmann (loan return to Borussia Dortmund)
32	DF	GER	Damian Roßbach (to SV Sandhausen)
38	GK	GER	Robin Zentner (on loan to Holstein Kiel)
--	DF	GER	Julian Koch (to Fortuna Düsseldorf, previously on loan at FC St. Pauli)
--	FW	GER	Sebastian Polter (to Queens Park Rangers F.C., previously on loan at 1. FC Union Berlin)
--	MF	GER	Besar Halimi (on loan to FSV Frankfurt)
--	FW	GER	Dani Schahin (on loan to FSV Frankfurt, previously on loan at SC Freiburg)
--	MF	GER	Chinedu Ede (to FC Twente, previously on loan at Anorthosis Famagusta FC)

=== 1. FC Köln ===
In:

No.	Pos.	Nation	Player
3	DF	GER	Dominique Heintz (from 1. FC Kaiserslautern)
4	DF	DEN	Frederik Sørensen (from Juventus FC)
8	MF	SRB	Miloš Jojić (from Borussia Dortmund)
11	FW	GER	Simon Zoller (loan return from 1. FC Kaiserslautern)
15	FW	AUT	Philipp Hosiner (on loan from Stade Rennais F.C.)
21	MF	GER	Leonardo Bittencourt (from Hannover 96)
27	FW	FRA	Anthony Modeste (from 1899 Hoffenheim)

Out:

No.	Pos.	Nation	Player
2	DF	SVN	Mišo Brečko (to 1. FC Nürnberg)
8	MF	POL	Adam Matuschyk (to Eintracht Braunschweig)
9	FW	NGA	Anthony Ujah (to Werder Bremen)
10	FW	GER	Patrick Helmes (retired)
11	FW	GER	Thomas Bröker (to MSV Duisburg)
17	MF	POL	Sławomir Peszko (to Lechia Gdańsk)
20	FW	BRA	Deyverson (loan return to C.F. Os Belenenses)
22	MF	GER	Daniel Halfar (to 1. FC Kaiserslautern)
28	DF	AUT	Kevin Wimmer (to Tottenham Hotspur F.C.)
39	DF	GER	André Wallenborn (to Hallescher FC)
--	MF	GER	Maximilian Thiel (to 1. FC Union Berlin, previously on loan)
--	DF	ESP	Román Golobart (released, previously on loan at FC Erzgebirge Aue)
--	FW	GER	Maurice Exslager (to 1. FC Köln II, previously on loan at SV Darmstadt 98)
--	DF	BRA	Bruno Nascimento (on loan to C.D. Tondela, previously on loan at G.D. Estoril Praia)

=== Hannover 96 ===
In:

No.	Pos.	Nation	Player
11	MF	GER	Felix Klaus (from SC Freiburg)
13	GK	GER	Philipp Tschauner (from FC St.Pauli)
14	FW	FRA	Allan Saint-Maximin (on loan from AS Monaco FC)
17	FW	DEN	Uffe Bech (from FC Nordsjælland)
27	DF	GER	Vladimir Ranković (loan return from FC Erzgebirge Aue)
29	DF	GER	Oliver Sorg (from SC Freiburg)
30	GK	AUT	Samuel Radlinger (loan return from 1. FC Nürnberg)
31	MF	GER	Waldemar Anton (from Hannover 96 youth)
33	MF	GER	Mike-Steven Bähre (from Hannover 96 II)
35	FW	NED	Charlison Benschop (from Fortuna Düsseldorf)
38	DF	ALB	Valmir Sulejmani (loan return from 1. FC Union Berlin)
39	FW	TUR	Mevlüt Erdinç (from AS Saint-Étienne)

Out:

No.	Pos.	Nation	Player
10	MF	GER	Lars Stindl (to Borussia Mönchengladbach)
11	FW	ESP	Joselu (to Stoke City F.C.)
13	FW	GER	Jan Schlaudraff (released)
14	GK	GER	Markus Miller (retired)
17	DF	POR	João Pereira (to Sporting Clube de Portugal)
18	DF	LTU	Marius Stankevičius (to Córdoba CF)
21	FW	FRA	Jimmy Briand (to En Avant de Guingamp)
24	DF	GER	Christian Pander (released)
30	FW	CIV	Didier Ya Konan (to Fortuna Düsseldorf)
32	MF	GER	Leonardo Bittencourt (to 1. FC Köln)
33	DF	GER	Yannik Schulze (released)
39	GK	AUT	Robert Almer (to FK Austria Wien)

=== VfB Stuttgart ===
In:

No.	Pos.	Nation	Player
1	GK	AUS	Mitchell Langerak (from Borussia Dortmund)
2	DF	ARG	Emiliano Insúa (from Atlético Madrid)
4	DF	BIH	Toni Šunjić (from FC Kuban Krasnodar)
8	MF	GER	Lukas Rupp (from SC Paderborn 07)
9	MF	AUS	Robbie Kruse (on loan from Bayer 04 Leverkusen)
14	DF	GER	Philip Heise (from 1. FC Heidenheim)
22	GK	POL	Przemysław Tytoń (from PSV Eindhoven)
27	MF	GER	Mart Ristl (from VfB Stuttgart youth)
28	MF	GER	Marvin Wanitzek (from VfB Stuttgart II)
31	MF	GER	Arianit Ferati (from VfB Stuttgart youth)
39	MF	CZE	Jan Kliment (from FC Vysočina Jihlava)
41	MF	GER	Stephen Sama (from VfB Stuttgart II)
42	MF	GER	Jerome Kiesewetter (from VfB Stuttgart II)
--	MF	GER	Joshua Kimmich (from RB Leipzig)
--	MF	AUT	Kevin Stöger (loan return from 1. FC Kaiserslautern)

Out:

No.	Pos.	Nation	Player
1	GK	GER	Sven Ulreich (to FC Bayern Munich)
2	DF	JPN	Gōtoku Sakai (to Hamburger SV)
5	DF	TUN	Karim Haggui (to Fortuna Düsseldorf)
8	MF	GER	Moritz Leitner (loan return to Borussia Dortmund)
9	FW	BIH	Vedad Ibišević (to Hertha BSC)
13	MF	ESP	Oriol Romeu (loan return to Chelsea F.C.)
22	GK	GER	Thorsten Kirschbaum (to 1. FC Nürnberg)
23	MF	TUR	Sercan Sararer (to Fortuna Düsseldorf)
23	MF	AUT	Kevin Stöger (to SC Paderborn 07)
24	DF	GER	Antonio Rüdiger (on loan to A.S. Roma)
25	FW	NOR	Mohammed Abdellaoue (to Vålerenga Fotball)
27	DF	GER	Tim Leibold (to 1. FC Nürnberg)
34	DF	GER	Konstantin Rausch (to SV Darmstadt 98)
39	MF	GER	Robin Yalçın (to Çaykur Rizespor)
--	MF	GER	Joshua Kimmich (to Bayern Munich)

=== Hertha BSC ===
In:

No.	Pos.	Nation	Player
5	MF	GER	Niklas Stark (from 1.FC Nürnberg)
6	MF	CZE	Vladimír Darida (from SC Freiburg)
11	FW	TUN	Sami Allagui (loan return from 1. FSV Mainz 05)
19	FW	BIH	Vedad Ibišević (from VfB Stuttgart)
20	MF	GER	Mitchell Weiser (from FC Bayern Munich)
29	GK	GER	Nils Körber (from Hertha BSC II)
31	MF	GER	Florian Kohls (from Hertha BSC II)
34	DF	GER	Maximilian Mittelstädt (from Hertha BSC II)

Out:

No.	Pos.	Nation	Player
5	DF	NED	John Heitinga (to AFC Ajax)
7	MF	JPN	Hajime Hosogai (on loan to Bursaspor)
8	MF	CMR	Marcel Ndjeng (to SC Paderborn 07)
18	DF	GER	Peter Niemeyer (to SV Darmstadt 98)
21	GK	GER	Sascha Burchert (on loan to Vålerenga Fotball)
26	DF	GER	Nico Schulz (to Borussia Mönchengladbach)
33	FW	GER	Sandro Wagner (to SV Darmstadt 98)
--	DF	GER	Fabian Holland (to SV Darmstadt 98, previously on loan)

=== Hamburger SV ===
In:

No.	Pos.	Nation	Player
4	DF	BIH	Emir Spahić (from Bayer Leverkusen)
8	MF	GER	Lewis Holtby (from Tottenham Hotspur F.C., previously on loan)
9	FW	GER	Sven Schipplock (from 1899 Hoffenheim)
12	MF	TUR	Ahmet Arslan (from Hamburger SV II)
14	MF	GER	Aaron Hunt (from VfL Wolfsburg)
18	DF	GER	Frank Ronstadt (from Hamburger SV youth)
20	MF	SWE	Albin Ekdal (from Cagliari Calcio)
23	FW	AUT	Michael Gregoritsch (from VfL Bochum)
24	DF	JPN	Gōtoku Sakai (from VfB Stuttgart)
33	FW	TUR	Batuhan Altıntaş (from Bursaspor)
34	MF	GER	Finn Porath (from Hamburger SV youth)
36	GK	SUI	Andreas Hirzel (from FC Vaduz)
--	FW	CMR	Jacques Zoua (loan return from Kayseri Erciyesspor)
--	DF	GER	Jonathan Tah (loan return from Fortuna Düsseldorf)
--	MF	GER	Kerem Demirbay (loan return from 1. FC Kaiserslautern)
--	MF	TUN	Mohamed Gouaida (from Hamburger SV II)

Out:

No.	Pos.	Nation	Player
4	DF	GER	Heiko Westermann (to Real Betis)
4	DF	GER	Jonathan Tah (to Bayer Leverkusen)
6	MF	GER	Kerem Demirbay (on loan to Fortuna Düsseldorf)
7	DF	GER	Marcell Jansen (retired)
9	MF	GER	Maximilian Beister (to 1. FSV Mainz 05)
19	MF	CZE	Petr Jiráček (to AC Sparta Prague)
21	MF	SUI	Valon Behrami (to Watford F.C.)
23	MF	NED	Rafael van der Vaart (to Real Betis)
24	MF	GER	Matti Steinmann (on loan to Chemnitzer FC)
25	MF	TUN	Mohamed Gouaida (on loan to Karlsruher SC)
30	GK	GER	Alexander Brunst (to VfL Wolfsburg II)
32	DF	SRB	Slobodan Rajković (released)
37	MF	USA	Julian Green (loan return to Bayern Munich)
37	FW	CMR	Jacques Zoua (to AC Ajaccio)
--	DF	GER	Lasse Sobiech (to FC St. Pauli, previously on loan)

=== FC Ingolstadt 04 ===
In:

No.	Pos.	Nation	Player
18	DF	FRA	Romain Brégerie (from SV Darmstadt 98)
25	FW	GER	Elias Kachunga (from SC Paderborn 07)
26	GK	NOR	Ørjan Nyland (from Molde FK)
29	DF	AUT	Markus Suttner (from FK Austria Wien)
31	MF	GER	Maurice Multhaup (from FC Schalke 04)

Out:

No.	Pos.	Nation	Player
2	DF	DEN	Leon Jessen (loan return to 1. FC Kaiserslautern)
4	FW	CRO	Andre Mijatović (retired)
18	FW	GER	Christian Eigler (released)
25	FW	GER	Karl-Heinz Lappe (to FC Bayern Munich II)
26	DF	GER	Ralph Gunesch (released)
33	GK	GER	André Weis (to FSV Frankfurt)

=== SV Darmstadt 98 ===
In:

No.	Pos.	Nation	Player
6	MF	GER	Mario Vrančić (from SC Paderborn 07)
10	MF	GER	Jan Rosenthal (from SG Eintracht Frankfurt, previously on loan)
13	DF	AUT	György Garics (from Bologna F.C. 1909)
14	FW	GER	Sandro Wagner (from Hertha BSC)
15	DF	CRC	Júnior Díaz (from 1. FSV Mainz 05)
18	DF	GER	Peter Niemeyer (from Hertha BSC)
32	DF	GER	Fabian Holland (from Hertha BSC, previously on loan)
33	DF	ITA	Luca Caldirola (on loan from Werder Bremen)
34	DF	GER	Konstantin Rausch (from VfB Stuttgart)
35	DF	SRB	Slobodan Rajković (free agent)
36	MF	GER	Jan Finger (from SV Darmstadt 98 youth)
37	MF	GER	Ali Kazimi (from SV Darmstadt 98 youth)
38	MF	GER	Nick Volk (from SV Darmstadt 98 youth)
39	DF	GER	Noel Wembacher (from SV Darmstadt 98 youth)
40	GK	POL	Łukasz Załuska (from Celtic F.C.)

Out:

No.	Pos.	Nation	Player
10	FW	GER	Maurice Exslager (loan return to 1. FC Köln)
13	FW	GER	Ronny König (to Chemnitzer FC)
14	DF	NGA	Leon Balogun (to 1. FSV Mainz 05)
17	MF	GER	Hanno Behrens (to 1. FC Nürnberg)
18	DF	FRA	Romain Brégerie (to FC Ingolstadt 04)
26	DF	GER	Serkan Fırat (released)
33	GK	GER	Marius Sauß (to Lupo Martini Wolfsburg)
36	DF	GER	Janik Bachmann (released)
37	DF	GER	Timon Fröhlich (released)

== 2. Bundesliga ==
=== SC Freiburg ===
In:

No.	Pos.	Nation	Player
2	DF	NOR	Vegar Eggen Hedenstad (loan return from Eintracht Braunschweig)
18	FW	GER	Nils Petersen (from Werder Bremen, previously on loan)
--	FW	GER	Joshua Mees (on loan from 1899 Hoffenheim)
--	MF	ALB	Amir Abrashi (from Grasshopper Club Zürich)
--	MF	ITA	Vincenzo Grifo (from TSG 1899 Hoffenheim, previously on loan at FSV Frankfurt)
--	FW	GER	Tim Kleindienst (from Energie Cottbus)
--	DF	GER	Lukas Kübler (from SV Sandhausen)
--	GK	GER	Alexander Schwolow (loan return from Arminia Bielefeld)

Out:

No.	Pos.	Nation	Player
1	GK	SUI	Roman Bürki (to Borussia Dortmund)
2	MF	CZE	Pavel Krmaš (to FC Hradec Králové)
7	MF	CZE	Vladimír Darida (to Hertha BSC)
11	FW	GER	Dani Schahin (loan return to 1. FSV Mainz 05)
14	FW	SUI	Admir Mehmedi (to Bayer Leverkusen)
17	MF	FRA	Jonathan Schmid (to TSG 1899 Hoffenheim)
19	GK	GER	Daniel Batz (to Chemnitzer FC)
22	DF	GER	Sascha Riether (to FC Schalke 04)
25	DF	GER	Oliver Sorg (to Hannover 96)
36	MF	GER	Felix Klaus (to Hannover 96)
15	DF	SRB	Stefan Mitrović (on loan to KAA Gent)
--	FW	GER	Hendrick Zuck (to Eintracht Braunschweig, previously on loan)

=== SC Paderborn 07 ===
In:

No.	Pos.	Nation	Player
7	MF	CMR	Marcel Ndjeng (from Hertha BSC)
18	MF	AUT	Kevin Stöger (from VfB Stuttgart)
19	FW	CRO	Marc Brašnić (on loan from Bayer Leverkusen)
24	GK	POR	Daniel Heuer Fernandes (from VfL Osnabrück)
--	MF	GER	Oliver Kirch (from Borussia Dortmund)

Out:

No.	Pos.	Nation	Player
4	MF	GER	Lukas Rupp (to VfB Stuttgart)
7	DF	GER	Jens Wemmer (to Panathinaikos F.C.)
8	MF	GER	Mario Vrančić (to SV Darmstadt 98)
12	GK	GER	Alexander Nübel (to FC Schalke 04)
13	DF	GER	Christian Strohdiek (to Fortuna Düsseldorf)
15	FW	GER	Elias Kachunga (to FC Ingolstadt 04)
28	DF	GER	Tim Welker (to Hessen Kassel)
34	FW	GER	Marvin Ducksch (loan return to Borussia Dortmund)

=== Karlsruher SC ===
In:

No.	Pos.	Nation	Player
9	FW	GRE	Dimitrios Diamantakos (on loan from Olympiacos)
16	MF	GER	Marvin Mehlem (from Karlsruher SC II)
26	DF	GER	Bjarne Thoelke (from VfL Wolfsburg)
27	FW	GER	Pascal Köpke (from SpVgg Unterhaching)
--	MF	GER	Grischa Prömel (from 1899 Hoffenheim)
--	MF	TUN	Mohamed Gouaida (on loan from Hamburger SV)

Out:

No.	Pos.	Nation	Player
30	MF	GER	Jannik Dehm (to 1899 Hoffenheim II)
31	DF	GER	Philipp Max (to FC Augsburg)
--	MF	KOR	Park Jung-bin (to Hobro IK)

=== 1. FC Kaiserslautern ===
In:

No.	Pos.	Nation	Player
--	GK	GER	Zlatan Alomerović (from Borussia Dortmund)
--	DF	DEN	Leon Jessen (loan return from FC Ingolstadt 04)
--	MF	GER	Daniel Halfar (from 1. FC Köln)
--	FW	POL	Kacper Przybyłko (from SpVgg Greuther Fürth)
--	FW	CRO	Antonio Čolak (on loan from 1899 Hoffenheim)

Out:

No.	Pos.	Nation	Player
1	GK	GER	Tobias Sippel (to Borussia Mönchengladbach)
4	DF	GER	Willi Orban (to RB Leipzig)
5	MF	GER	Kerem Demirbay (loan return to Hamburger SV)
9	FW	GER	Simon Zoller (loan return to 1. FC Köln)
20	MF	AUT	Kevin Stöger (loan return to VfB Stuttgart)
28	MF	GER	Amin Younes (loan return to Borussia Mönchengladbach)
33	DF	GER	Dominique Heintz (to 1. FC Köln)

=== RB Leipzig ===
In:

No.	Pos.	Nation	Player
4	DF	GER	Willi Orban (from 1. FC Kaiserslautern)
5	DF	TUR	Atınç Nukan (from Beşiktaş J.K.)
7	FW	AUT	Marcel Sabitzer (loan return from Red Bull Salzburg)
13	MF	AUT	Stefan Ilsanker (from FC Red Bull Salzburg)
14	MF	BEL	Massimo Bruno (loan return from Red Bull Salzburg)
17	FW	GER	Nils Quaschner (from FC Red Bull Salzburg)
20	MF	GER	Ken Gipson (from VfB Stuttgart)
27	FW	GER	Davie Selke (from Werder Bremen)
32	GK	HUN	Péter Gulácsi (from FC Red Bull Salzburg)
--	MF	GER	Gino Fechner (from VfL Bochum)
--	MF	POL	Kamil Wojtkowski (from Pogoń Szczecin)
--	DF	RUS	Dmitri Skopintsev (from FC Zenit Saint Petersburg)

Out:

No.	Pos.	Nation	Player
5	MF	GER	Henrik Ernst (to RB Leipzig II)
10	FW	CRO	Ante Rebić (loan return to ACF Fiorentina)
11	FW	GER	Daniel Frahn (to 1. FC Heidenheim)
13	FW	ISR	Omer Damari (to Red Bull Salzburg)
17	MF	GER	Joshua Kimmich (to VfB Stuttgart)
20	DF	BRA	Rodnei (loan return to Red Bull Salzburg)
27	GK	GER	Thomas Dähne (to HJK)
28	DF	GER	Fabian Franke (to SV Wehen Wiesbaden)
29	MF	GER	Sebastian Heidinger (to 1. FC Heidenheim)
34	FW	PER	Yordy Reyna (loan return to Red Bull Salzburg)
--	MF	GER	Clemens Fandrich (to FC Luzern, previously on loan to Erzgebirge Aue)
--	MF	GER	Matthias Morys (to VfR Aalen, previously on loan to SG Sonnenhof Großaspach)

=== Eintracht Braunschweig ===
In:

No.	Pos.	Nation	Player
4	DF	SWE	Joseph Baffo (from Halmstads BK)
8	MF	POL	Adam Matuszczyk (from 1. FC Köln)
16	GK	BIH	Jasmin Fejzić (from VfR Aalen)
17	DF	GHA	Phil Ofosu-Ayeh (from VfR Aalen)
18	FW	SUI	Orhan Ademi (loan return from VfR Aalen)
21	MF	GER	Patrick Schönfeld (from FC Erzgebirge Aue)
23	FW	DEN	Mads Dittmer Hvilsom (from Hobro IK)
30	FW	GER	Hendrick Zuck (from SC Freiburg, previously on loan)

Out:

No.	Pos.	Nation	Player
2	DF	NOR	Vegar Eggen Hedenstad (loan return to SC Freiburg)
4	DF	GER	Matthias Henn (to F.C. Hansa Rostock)
5	DF	GER	Benjamin Kessel (to 1. FC Union Berlin)
7	FW	NOR	Håvard Nielsen (loan return to RB Salzburg)
8	DF	TUR	Deniz Doğan (retired)
13	MF	GER	Raffael Korte (to 1. FC Union Berlin)
14	FW	KOR	Ryu Seung-woo (loan return to Bayer Leverkusen)
15	MF	GER	Norman Theuerkauf (to 1. FC Heidenheim)
20	FW	GER	Torsten Oehrl (to SV Wehen Wiesbaden)
21	DF	GER	Jan Washausen (to SV Elversberg)
32	FW	GER	Dennis Kruppke (retired)
--	FW	GER	Gianluca Korte (released, previously on loan at VfR Aalen)

=== 1. FC Union Berlin ===
In:

No.	Pos.	Nation	Player
11	MF	GER	Maximilian Thiel (from 1. FC Köln, previously on loan)
15	FW	USA	Bobby Wood (from TSV 1860 München)
--	MF	GER	Dennis Daube (from FC St. Pauli)
--	DF	GER	Benjamin Kessel (from Eintracht Braunschweig)
--	MF	GER	Raffael Korte (from Eintracht Braunschweig)

Out:

No.	Pos.	Nation	Player
18	FW	GER	Martin Kobylański (loan return to SV Werder Bremen)
23	FW	GER	Sebastian Polter (loan return to 1. FSV Mainz 05)
26	MF	ALB	Valmir Sulejmani (loan return to Hannover 96)

=== 1. FC Heidenheim ===
In:

No.	Pos.	Nation	Player
--	GK	GER	Kevin Müller (from VfB Stuttgart II)
--	MF	GER	Norman Theuerkauf (from Eintracht Braunschweig)
--	MF	GER	Sebastian Heidinger (from RB Leipzig)
--	MF	GER	Felix Schröter (on loan from FC Schalke 04)
--	DF	GER	Ronny Philp (from FC Augsburg)

Out:

No.	Pos.	Nation	Player
8	DF	GER	Philip Heise (to VfB Stuttgart)
31	FW	GER	Florian Niederlechner (to 1. FSV Mainz 05)

=== 1. FC Nürnberg ===
In:

No.	Pos.	Nation	Player
--	MF	GER	Hanno Behrens (from SV Darmstadt 98)
--	GK	GER	Thorsten Kirschbaum (from VfB Stuttgart)
--	FW	GER	Stefan Kutschke (from VfL Wolfsburg)
--	DF	SVN	Mišo Brečko (from 1. FC Köln)

Out:

No.	Pos.	Nation	Player
16	MF	GER	Niklas Stark (to Hertha BSC)
23	MF	SUI	Adrian Nikçi (to 1. FC Union Berlin)
32	GK	AUT	Samuel Radlinger (loan return to Hannover 96)
34	FW	GER	Peniel Mlapa (loan return to Borussia Mönchengladbach)
38	DF	GER	Manuel Bihr (to Stuttgarter Kickers)

=== Fortuna Düsseldorf ===
In:

No.	Pos.	Nation	Player
2	DF	GER	Julian Koch (from 1. FSV Mainz 05)
3	DF	TUN	Karim Haggui (from VfB Stuttgart)
6	DF	GER	Kevin Akpoguma (on loan from 1899 Hoffenheim)
10	MF	GER	Kerem Demirbay (on loan from Hamburger SV)
22	MF	TUR	Sercan Sararer (from VfB Stuttgart)
29	DF	GER	Alexander Madlung (free agent, previously at Eintracht Frankfurt)
31	MF	GER	Marcel Sobottka (from FC Schalke 04)
33	FW	CIV	Didier Ya Konan (from Hannover 96)
34	DF	GER	Christian Strohdiek (from SC Paderborn 07)
35	DF	GER	Fabian Holthaus (from VfL Bochum)

Out:

No.	Pos.	Nation	Player
8	DF	GER	Dustin Bomheuer (to MSV Duisburg)
11	FW	NED	Charlison Benschop (to Hannover 96)
28	DF	GER	Jonathan Tah (loan return to Hamburger SV)

=== VfL Bochum ===
In:

No.	Pos.	Nation	Player
3	DF	NED	Giliano Wijnaldum (from Go Ahead Eagles)
17	MF	GER	Tobias Weis (from TSG 1899 Hoffenheim, previously on loan)
23	FW	GER	Janik Haberer (on loan from TSG 1899 Hoffenheim)
33	GK	GER	Manuel Riemann (from SV Sandhausen)
--	FW	GER	Peniel Mlapa (from Borussia Mönchengladbach)
--	FW	AUT	Michael Gregoritsch (from TSG 1899 Hoffenheim, previously on loan)

Out:

No.	Pos.	Nation	Player
3	DF	GER	Fabian Holthaus (to Fortuna Düsseldorf)
5	DF	GER	Heiko Butscher (retired)
9	FW	SVK	Stanislav Šesták (to Ferencvárosi TC)
10	MF	JPN	Yusuke Tasaka (to Kawasaki Frontale)
11	FW	AUT	Michael Gregoritsch (to Hamburger SV)
14	MF	BIH	Adnan Zahirović (to Hapoel Acre F.C.)
15	DF	GER	Nicolas Abdat (to VfL Wolfsburg II)
18	MF	GER	Danny Latza (to 1. FSV Mainz 05)
23	MF	GER	Thomas Eisfeld (loan return to Fulham F.C.)
28	FW	GER	Joel Reinholz (released)
31	GK	GER	Michael Esser (to SK Sturm Graz)
33	FW	FIN	Mikael Forssell (released)
38	GK	GER	Marius Weeke (to SC Wiedenbrück)
39	MF	NOR	Henrik Gulden (on loan to Mjøndalen IF)
41	FW	RUS	Laurynas Kulikas (to Hamburger SV II)

=== SV Sandhausen ===
In:

No.	Pos.	Nation	Player
--	DF	GER	Damian Roßbach (from 1.FSV Mainz 05)
--	MF	POL	Jakub Kosecki (on loan from Legia Warsaw)

Out:

No.	Pos.	Nation	Player
30	DF	GER	Lukas Kübler (to SC Freiburg)
33	GK	GER	Manuel Riemann (to VfL Bochum)

=== FSV Frankfurt ===
In:

No.	Pos.	Nation	Player
1	GK	GER	André Weis (from FC Ingolstadt 04)
10	MF	GER	Besar Halimi (on loan from 1. FSV Mainz 05)
11	FW	KOR	In-hyeok Park (on loan from 1899 Hoffenheim)
19	FW	GER	Dani Schahin (on loan from 1. FSV Mainz 05)
38	FW	BRA	Felipe Pires (on loan from 1899 Hoffenheim)

Out:

No.	Pos.	Nation	Player
32	MF	ITA	Vincenzo Grifo (loan return to TSG 1899 Hoffenheim)

=== SpVgg Greuther Fürth ===
In:

No.	Pos.	Nation	Player
19	FW	NOR	Veton Berisha (from Viking FK)
39	MF	GER	Tom Trybull (from FC St. Pauli)

Out:

No.	Pos.	Nation	Player
27	DF	GER	Ronny Philp (loan return to FC Augsburg)
21	FW	POL	Kacper Przybyłko (to 1. FC Kaiserslautern)

=== FC St. Pauli ===
In:

No.	Pos.	Nation	Player
3	DF	GER	Lasse Sobiech (from Hamburger SV, previously on loan)
8	MF	GER	Jeremy Dudziak (from Borussia Dortmund)
9	FW	USA	Fafà Picault (from Sparta Prague)
13	MF	JPN	Ryo Miyaichi (from Arsenal, previously on loan at FC Twente)
16	DF	GER	Marc Hornschuh (from FSV Frankfurt)
17	DF	GHA	Davidson Drobo-Ampem (from FC Wacker Innsbruck)

Out:

No.	Pos.	Nation	Player
2	DF	GER	Julian Koch (loan return to 1. FSV Mainz 05)
5	MF	GER	Tom Trybull (to SpVgg Greuther Fürth)
6	MF	GER	Florian Kringe (retired)
7	MF	GER	Dennis Daube (to 1. FC Union Berlin)
9	FW	GER	Christopher Nöthe (to Arminia Bielefeld)
13	GK	GER	Philipp Tschauner (to Hannover 96)
14	FW	CRO	Ante Budimir (on loan to Crotone)
16	DF	GER	Markus Thorandt (released)
20	DF	GER	Sebastian Schachten (to FC Luzern)
22	MF	GER	Michael Görlitz (to Arminia Bielefeld)
23	DF	GER	Marcel Halstenberg (to RB Leipzig)
40	MF	PAN	Armando Cooper (released)

=== 1860 Munich ===
In:

No.	Pos.	Nation	Player
--	DF	SRB	Miloš Degenek (from VfB Stuttgart II)

Out:

No.	Pos.	Nation	Player
28	MF	GER	Julian Weigl (to Borussia Dortmund)
—	FW	USA	Bobby Wood (to 1. FC Union Berlin)

=== Arminia Bielefeld ===
In:

No.	Pos.	Nation	Player
--	DF	GER	Steffen Lang (from VfB Stuttgart II)
--	GK	IRN	Daniel Davari (from Grasshopper Zurich)
--	DF	GER	Brian Behrendt (from Rapid Wien)

Out:

No.	Pos.	Nation	Player
1	GK	GER	Alexander Schwolow (loan return to SC Freiburg)

=== MSV Duisburg ===
In:

No.	Pos.	Nation	Player
4	DF	GER	Dustin Bomheuer (from Fortuna Düsseldorf)
8	FW	GER	Thomas Bröker (from 1. FC Köln)
11	FW	RUS	Stanislav Iljutcenko (from VfL Osnabrück)
16	MF	GER	Andreas Wiegel (from Rot-Weiß Erfurt)
18	FW	GER	Simon Brandstetter (from Rot-Weiß Erfurt)
27	DF	GER	Dan-Patrick Poggenberg (from VfL Wolfsburg)

Out:

No.	Pos.	Nation	Player
11	MF	GER	Michael Gardawski (to Hansa Rostock)
16	FW	GER	Gökhan Lekesiz (to Fortuna Sittard)
23	MF	GER	Fabian Schnellhardt (on loan to Holstein Kiel)
—	DF	GER	Babacar M'Bengue (to SC Wiedenbrück)

== See also ==
- 2015–16 Bundesliga
- 2015–16 2. Bundesliga
