= 2014–15 VfL Bochum season =

VfL Bochum
2014–15 season
- Chairman: Hans-Peter Villis
- Head coach: Peter Neururer (until 9 December 2014); Frank Heinemann (ad interim, until 31 December 2014); Gertjan Verbeek (since 1 January 2015)
- Stadium: rewirpowerSTADION
- 2. Bundesliga: 11th
- DFB-Pokal: Second Round
- Top goalscorer: League: Terodde (16); All: Terodde (19)
- Highest home attendance: 25,094 (vs 1. FC Nürnberg, 3 October 2014)
- Lowest home attendance: 11,594 (vs FSV Frankfurt, 27 February 2015)
- Average home league attendance: 16,885
| Home colours | Away colours |

The 2014–15 VfL Bochum season was the 77th season in club history.

== Review and events ==
On 9 December 2014 head coach Peter Neururer was sacked and replaced by caretaker Frank Heinemann. On 22 December 2014 the VfL Bochum announced signing Gertjan Verbeek as head coach, starting 1 January 2015.

== Matches ==
=== Legend ===
Win Draw Loss

=== Friendly matches ===
| 5 July 2014 Friendly | VfB Langendreerholz | 0 – 21 | VfL Bochum | Bochum |
| 14:00 | | | Gregoritsch 8', 18', 29', 36', 44'; Terodde 20', 32', 35', 42'; Terrazzino 40'; Kulikas 46', 51', 59'; Tasaka 48', 57'; Gündüz 49', 78', 80'; Latza 65', 81'; Zahirović 90' | Stadium: Sportplatz Hörder Straße; Attendance: 1,000; Referee: Thomas Altgeld (Bochum) |

| 6 July 2014 Friendly | Selection Kreis Höxter | 0 – 10 | VfL Bochum | Beverungen |
| 15:00 | | | Gündüz 9', 85'; Tasaka 12'; Terodde 18'; Ćwielong 36'; Zahirović 55'; Stock 55'; Kulikas 58', 84'; Gregoritsch 64' | Stadium: Urentalstadion; Attendance: 600; Referee: Florian Greger (Siddelsen) |

| 12 July 2014 Friendly | SV Zweckel | 0 – 8 | VfL Bochum | Gladbeck |
| 14:00 | | | Kulikas 33'; Terodde 41'; Jungwirth 45'; Šesták 48', 88'; Latza 54'; Gregoritsch 60'; Tasaka 73' | Stadium: Stadion Gladbeck; Attendance: 815; Referee: Kathrin Heumann (Zweckel) |

| 15 July 2014 Friendly | VfB Homberg | 0 – 5 | VfL Bochum | Duisburg |
| 19:00 | | | Gregoritsch 41'; Tasaka 60' (pen.); Kulikas 65', 66'; Terrazzino 79' | Stadium: PCC-Stadion |

| 18 July 2014 Friendly | VfL Bochum | 3 – 1 | VfL Wolfsburg | Bochum |
| 18:00 | Šimůnek 10'; Terodde 19'; Losilla 45+2' | | Hunt 58' | Stadium: rewirpowerSTADION; Attendance: 3,500; Referee: Thorben Siewer (Drolshagen) |

| 22 July 2014 Friendly | K.A.S. Eupen | 0 – 1 | VfL Bochum | Eupen |
| 18:30 | | | Gulden 75' | Stadium: Kehrweg Stadion |

| 25 July 2014 Friendly | FC Terek Grozny | 2 – 1 | VfL Bochum | Enzesfeld-Lindabrunn |
| 18:00 | Aílton 63' (pen.), 82' | | Gregoritsch 87' | Stadium: Sportschule Lindabrunn |

| 5 August 2014 Friendly | VfL Bochum | 1 – 1 | FC Schalke 04 | Bochum |
| 19:00 | Gregoritsch 61' | | Aogo 88' | Stadium: rewirpowerSTADION; Attendance: 6,764; Referee: Thorsten Kinhöfer (Herne) |

| 5 September 2014 Friendly | TuS Querenburg | 0 – 14 | VfL Bochum | Bochum |
| 18:00 | | | Terodde 20', 27' (pen.); Terrazzino 32', 42'; Ćwielong 45', 68', 70', 83'; Gulden 45+1', 81'; Forssell 54', 58', 72', 90' | Stadium: Rasenplatz an der Westerholtstraße; Attendance: 800 |

| 6 September 2014 Friendly | Borussia Mönchengladbach | 2 – 4 | VfL Bochum | Mönchengladbach |
| 15:00 | Perthel 22' (o.g.); Schulz 53' | | Weis 16'; Latza 17'; Forssell 57'; Gündüz 83' | Stadium: Fohlenplatz; Attendance: 1,000; Referee: Sascha Stegemann (Niederkassel) |

| 10 October 2014 Friendly | CSV Sportfreunde Bochum-Linden | 0 – 4 | VfL Bochum | Bochum |
| 17:00 | | | Forssell 21'; Latza 26'; Terrazzino 34', 81' | Stadium: Sportanlage In-der-Hei; Attendance: 1,100; Referee: Steenebrügge (Bochum) |

| 11 November 2014 Friendly | Luxembourg | 4 – 2 | VfL Bochum | Luxembourg-Beggen |
| 19:00 | Turpel 27'; Deville 63', 69', 83' | | Ćwielong 17'; Terrazzino 58' | Stadium: Stade rue Henri Dunant; Attendance: 275; Referee: Frank Bourgnon |

| 14 November 2014 Friendly | Arminia Bielefeld | 0 – 2 | VfL Bochum | Harsewinkel-Marienfeld |
| 15:00 | | | Gregoritsch 34'; Weis 57' | Stadium: Klosterpforte; Attendance: 0 Referee: Thorben Siewer (Drolshagen) |

| 11 January 2015 Friendly | Cercle Brugge K.S.V. | 1 – 0 | VfL Bochum | San Pedro del Pinatar, Spain |
| 15:00 | Haroun 12' | | | Stadium: Pinatar Arena; Referee: Juan Antonio Campos Salinas |

| 16 January 2015 Friendly | Alianza Lima | 0 – 1 | VfL Bochum | San Pedro del Pinatar, Spain |
| 16:00 | | | Losilla 31' | Stadium: Pinatar Arena; Referee: Jesus Villabla Eabaldeon |

| 20 January 2015 Friendly | VfL Bochum | 3 – 1 | FC Rot-Weiß Erfurt | Bochum |
| 15:00 | Terodde 19'; Tasaka 25' (pen.); Terrazzino 68' | | Tyrała 10' (pen.) | Stadium: Sportplatz am rewirpowerSTADION; Attendance: 400; Referee: Thorben Siewer (Drolshagen) |

| 23 January 2015 Friendly | VfL Bochum | 1 – 5 | FC Bayern Munich | Bochum |
| 18:00 | Latza 5' | | Robben 26', 78'; Dante 43'; Götze 66'; Rode 84' | Stadium: rewirpowerSTADION; Attendance: 29,299; Referee: Sven Waschitzki (Essen) |

| 31 January 2015 Friendly | SpVgg Greuther Fürth | 1 – 1 | VfL Bochum | Fürth |
| 13:00 | Trinks 37' | | Ćwielong 15' | Stadium: Stadion am Laubenweg; Attendance: 200; Referee: Florian Badstübner (Windsbach) |

| 27 March 2015 Friendly | VfL Bochum | 2 – 0 | Lierse S.K. | Hoenderloo, Netherlands |
| 16:30 | Forssell 4', 21' | | | Attendance: 0 |

=== 2. Bundesliga ===
==== League fixtures and results ====
| 2 August 2014 1 | VfL Bochum | 1 – 1 | SpVgg Greuther Fürth | Bochum |
| 15:30 | Terodde 15' | | Przybyłko 18' | Stadium: rewirpowerSTADION; Attendance: 18,146; Referee: Tobias Stieler (Hamburg) |

| 9 August 2014 2 | FC Erzgebirge Aue | 1 – 5 | VfL Bochum | Aue |
| 15:30 | Okoronkwo 16' | | Šesták 5', 28'; Tasaka 41'; Terodde 66', 78' | Stadium: Sparkassen-Erzgebirgsstadion; Attendance: 8,850; Referee: Robert Kempter (Sauldorf) |

| 25 August 2014 3 | VfL Bochum | 1 – 1 | 1. FC Union Berlin | Bochum |
| 20:15 | Terodde 69' | | Brandy 49' | Stadium: rewirpowerSTADION; Attendance: 16,307; Referee: Sascha Stegemann (Niederkassel) |

| 31 August 2014 4 | Eintracht Braunschweig | 1 – 2 | VfL Bochum | Braunschweig |
| 13:30 | Boland 17' | | Terodde 5', 77' | Stadium: Eintracht-Stadion; Attendance: 22,275; Referee: Manuel Gräfe (Berlin) |

| 12 September 2014 5 | VfL Bochum | 1 – 1 | Karlsruher SC | Bochum |
| 18:30 | Tasaka 62' | | Torres 19' | Stadium: rewirpowerSTADION; Attendance: 21,168; Referee: Knut Kircher (Rottenburg) |

| 20 September 2014 6 | FSV Frankfurt | 1 – 5 | VfL Bochum | Frankfurt am Main |
| 13:00 | Kapllani 41' | | Losilla 29'; Gregoritsch 57'; Terodde 64' (pen.), 79'; Šesták 84' | Stadium: Volksbank Stadion; Attendance: 5,677; Referee: Martin Thomsen (Kleve) |

| 25 September 2014 7 | VfL Bochum | 1 – 1 | Fortuna Düsseldorf | Bochum |
| 20:15 | Gregoritsch 14' | | Pohjanpalo 67' | Stadium: rewirpowerSTADION; Attendance: 24,466; Referee: Christian Dingert (Lebecksmühle) |

| 28 September 2014 8 | 1. FC Heidenheim | 5 – 0 | VfL Bochum | Heidenheim an der Brenz |
| 13:30 | Mayer 9'; Schnatterer 20' (pen.), 28'; Niederlechner 39'; Leipertz 77' | | | Stadium: Voith-Arena; Attendance: 11,500; Referee: Guido Winkmann (Kerken) |

| 3 October 2014 9 | VfL Bochum | 1 – 1 | 1. FC Nürnberg | Bochum |
| 18:30 | Gregoritsch 44' | | Sylvestr 56' | Stadium: rewirpowerSTADION; Attendance: 25,094; Referee: Peter Gagelmann (Bremen) |

| 17 October 2014 10 | VfL Bochum | 1 – 1 | SV Darmstadt 98 | Bochum |
| 18:30 | Forssell 90+5' | | Brégerie 10' | Stadium: rewirpowerSTADION; Attendance: 19,618; Referee: Robert Hartmann (Wangen) |

| 24 October 2014 11 | RB Leipzig | 2 – 0 | VfL Bochum | Leipzig |
| 18:30 | Holthaus 7' (o.g.); Frahn 33' | | | Stadium: Zentralstadion; Attendance: 30,194; Referee: Benjamin Brand (Gerolzhofen) |

| 2 November 2014 12 | VfL Bochum | 0 – 3 | TSV 1860 Munich | Bochum |
| 13:30 | | | Okotie 62', 74'; Adlung 87' | Stadium: rewirpowerSTADION; Attendance: 15,607; Referee: Patrick Ittrich (Hamburg) |

| 7 November 2014 13 | 1. FC Kaiserslautern | 2 – 2 | VfL Bochum | Kaiserslautern |
| 18:30 | Lakić 48'; Jacob 82' | | Terodde 32'; Šesták 88' | Stadium: Fritz-Walter-Stadion; Attendance: 24,708; Referee: Robert Kampka (Mainz) |

| 21 November 2014 14 | VfL Bochum | 4 – 0 | VfR Aalen | Bochum |
| 18:30 | Hainault 2' (o.g.); Terodde 57'; Terrazzino 66'; Forssell 89' | | | Stadium: rewirpowerSTADION; Attendance: 11,709; Referee: Günter Perl (Pullach) |

| 29 November 2014 15 | FC Ingolstadt 04 | 3 – 0 | VfL Bochum | Ingolstadt |
| 18:30 | Hartmann 24'; Hinterseer 67'; Leckie 89' | | | Stadium: Audi Sportpark; Attendance: 6,779; Referee: Norbert Grudzinski (Hamburg) |

| 5 December 2014 16 | VfL Bochum | 3 – 3 | FC St. Pauli | Bochum |
| 18:30 | Ziereis 38' (o.g.); Šesták 58'; Weis 81' | | Verhoek 33'; Daube 40'; Maier 69' | Stadium: rewirpowerSTADION; Attendance: 17,134; Referee: Sven Jablonski (Bremen) |

| 12 December 2014 17 | SV Sandhausen | 0 – 0 | VfL Bochum | Sandhausen |
| 18:30 | | | | Stadium: Hardtwaldstadion; Attendance: 4,023; Referee: Michael Weiner (Giesen) |

| 16 December 2014 18 | SpVgg Greuther Fürth | 0 – 0 | VfL Bochum | Fürth |
| 17:30 | | | | Stadium: Stadion am Laubenweg; Attendance: 8,750; Referee: Martin Petersen (Stuttgart) |

| 21 December 2014 19 | VfL Bochum | 1 – 1 | FC Erzgebirge Aue | Bochum |
| 13:30 | Weis 90' | | Klingbeil 33' | Stadium: rewirpowerSTADION; Attendance: 12,025; Referee: Robert Kampka (Mainz) |

| 7 February 2015 20 | 1. FC Union Berlin | 2 – 1 | VfL Bochum | Berlin |
| 13:00 | Kobylański 50'; Kreilach 86' | | Gündüz 32' | Stadium: Stadion An der Alten Försterei; Attendance: 19,015; Referee: Michael Weiner (Giesen) |

| 13 February 2015 21 | VfL Bochum | 3 – 2 | Eintracht Braunschweig | Bochum |
| 18:30 | Terodde 36', 47' (pen.); Terrazzino 41' | | Boland 3'; Vrančić 84' | Stadium: rewirpowerSTADION; Attendance: 13,778; Referee: Manuel Gräfe (Berlin) |

| 21 February 2015 22 | Karlsruher SC | 0 – 0 | VfL Bochum | Karlsruhe |
| 13:00 | | | | Stadium: Wildparkstadion; Attendance: 11,989; Referee: Robert Kampka (Mainz) |

| 27 February 2015 23 | VfL Bochum | 3 – 3 | FSV Frankfurt | Bochum |
| 18:30 | Terrazzino 16'; Eisfeld 61'; Latza 81' | | Dedić 79'; Kapllani 84' (pen.), 90+1' | Stadium: rewirpowerSTADION; Attendance: 11,594; Referee: Christian Dietz (Kronach) |

| 6 March 2015 24 | Fortuna Düsseldorf | 2 – 2 | VfL Bochum | Düsseldorf |
| 18:30 | Benschop 12'; Liendl 24' (pen.) | | Šesták 9', 45' | Stadium: Esprit Arena; Attendance: 33,481; Referee: Patrick Ittrich (Hamburg) |

| 13 March 2015 25 | VfL Bochum | 4 – 1 | 1. FC Heidenheim | Bochum |
| 18:30 | Terodde 11'; Šesták 20', 70'; Gregoritsch 74' | | Leipertz 41' (pen.) | Stadium: rewirpowerSTADION; Attendance: 14,639; Referee: Benjamin Cortus (Röthenbach an der Pegnitz) |

| 23 March 2015 26 | 1. FC Nürnberg | 1 – 2 | VfL Bochum | Nuremberg |
| 20:15 | Mlapa 70' | | Terrazzino 38'; Terodde 64' | Stadium: Frankenstadion; Attendance: 25,528; Referee: Harm Osmers (Hannover) |

| 5 April 2015 27 | SV Darmstadt 98 | 2 – 0 | VfL Bochum | Darmstadt |
| 13:30 | Brégerie 22'; Balogun 77' | | | Stadium: Stadion am Böllenfalltor; Attendance: 16,000; Referee: Daniel Siebert (Berlin) |

| 12 April 2015 28 | VfL Bochum | 1 – 2 | RB Leipzig | Bochum |
| 13:30 | Terodde 62' | | Poulsen 13'; Kaiser 67' | Stadium: rewirpowerSTADION; Attendance: 18,529; Referee: Michael Weiner (Giesen) |

| 18 April 2015 29 | TSV 1860 Munich | 2 – 1 | VfL Bochum | Munich |
| 13:00 | Wolf 56'; Hain 90+2' | | Gregoritsch 16' | Stadium: Allianz Arena; Attendance: 16,000; Referee: Markus Schmidt (Stuttgart) |

| 24 April 2015 30 | VfL Bochum | 0 – 2 | 1. FC Kaiserslautern | Bochum |
| 18:45 | | | Zoller 31'; Hofmann 76' | Stadium: rewirpowerSTADION; Attendance: 19,057; Referee: Peter Gagelmann (Bremen) |

| 3 May 2015 31 | VfR Aalen | 2 – 4 | VfL Bochum | Aalen |
| 13:30 | Steinhöfer 66' (pen.); Ademi 75' | | Bulut 16'; Terodde 32'; Terrazzino 54'; Quaner 62' (o.g.) | Stadium: Scholz Arena; Attendance: 8,566; Referee: Bastian Dankert (Rostock) |

| 10 May 2015 32 | VfL Bochum | 3 – 1 | FC Ingolstadt 04 | Bochum |
| 13:30 | Gregoritsch 45+1' (pen.); Forssell 72'; Tasaka 83' | | Hinterseer 32' | Stadium: rewirpowerSTADION; Attendance: 12,611; Referee: Tobias Welz (Wiesbaden) |

| 17 May 2015 33 | FC St. Pauli | 5 – 1 | VfL Bochum | Hamburg |
| 15:30 | Thy 34', 52'; Halstenberg 45+1'; Buchtmann 49'; Sobota 83' | | Gregoritsch 4' | Stadium: Millerntor-Stadion; Attendance: 23,584; Referee: Deniz Aytekin (Oberasbach) |

| 24 May 2015 34 | VfL Bochum | 0 – 0 | SV Sandhausen | Bochum |
| 15:30 | | | | Stadium: rewirpowerSTADION; Attendance: 15,562; Referee: Frank Willenborg (Osnabrück) |

==== League table ====
| Pos | Team | Pld | W | D | L | GF | GA | GD | Pts |
|---|---|---|---|---|---|---|---|---|---|
| 9 | 1. FC Nürnberg | 34 | 13 | 6 | 15 | 42 | 47 | −5 | 45 |
| 10 | Fortuna Düsseldorf | 34 | 11 | 11 | 12 | 48 | 52 | −4 | 44 |
| 11 | VfL Bochum | 34 | 9 | 15 | 10 | 53 | 55 | −2 | 42 |
| 12 | SV Sandhausen | 34 | 10 | 12 | 12 | 32 | 37 | −5 | 39 (Note: SV Sandhausen were deducted three points for license violation.) |
| 13 | FSV Frankfurt | 34 | 10 | 9 | 15 | 41 | 53 | −12 | 39 |

Source: DFB
Rules for classification: 1) Points; 2) Goal difference; 3) Goals scored

=== DFB-Pokal ===
| 16 August 2014 R1 | VfL Bochum | 2 – 0 | VfB Stuttgart | Bochum |
| 15:30 | Terodde 9', 48' | | | Stadium: rewirpowerSTADION; Attendance: 22,648; Referee: Wolfgang Stark (Ergolding) |

| 28 October 2014 R2 | Dynamo Dresden | 2 – 1 (a.e.t.) | VfL Bochum | Dresden |
| 20:30 | Eilers 61', 94' | | Terodde 54' | Stadium: Glücksgas Stadium; Attendance: 28,053; Referee: Markus Wingenbach (Mainz) |

== Squad ==
=== Squad and statistics ===
==== Squad, appearances and goals scored ====
As of 25 May 2015

| No. | Pos | Nat | Player | Total | | 2. Bundesliga | | DFB-Pokal | |
| No. | Pos | Nat | Player | Apps | Goals | Apps | Goals | Apps | Goals |
|---|---|---|---|---|---|---|---|---|---|
| 1 | GK | (Germany) GER | Andreas Luthe (captain until January 2015) | 20 | 0 | 18 | 0 | 2 | 0 |
| 2 | DF | (Germany) GER | Jan Gyamerah | 0 | 0 | 0 | 0 | 0 | 0 |
| 3 | DF | (Germany) GER | Fabian Holthaus | 5 | 0 | 4 | 0 | 1 | 0 |
| 4 | DF | (Germany) GER | Malcolm Cacutalua (since 27 August 2014) | 21 | 0 | 20 | 0 | 1 | 0 |
| 5 | DF | (Germany) GER | Heiko Butscher | 7 | 0 | 6 | 0 | 1 | 0 |
| 6 | DF | (Czech Republic) CZE | Jan Šimůnek | 7 | 0 | 6 | 0 | 1 | 0 |
| 7 | FW | (Germany) GER | Marco Terrazzino | 30 | 5 | 28 | 5 | 2 | 0 |
| 8 | MF | (France) FRA | Anthony Losilla | 34 | 1 | 32 | 1 | 2 | 0 |
| 9 | FW | (Slovakia) SVK | Stanislav Šesták | 28 | 9 | 26 | 9 | 2 | 0 |
| 10 | MF | (Japan) JPN | Yusuke Tasaka | 23 | 3 | 21 | 3 | 2 | 0 |
| 11 | FW | (Austria) AUT | Michael Gregoritsch | 26 | 7 | 24 | 7 | 2 | 0 |
| 13 | DF | (Germany) GER | Felix Bastians (since 1 January 2015) | 14 | 0 | 14 | 0 | 0 | 0 |
| 14 | MF | (Bosnia and Herzegovina) BIH | Adnan Zahirović | 10 | 0 | 9 | 0 | 1 | 0 |
| 15 | DF | (Germany) GER | Nicolas Abdat (since 11 November 2014) | 6 | 0 | 6 | 0 | 0 | 0 |
| 16 | DF | (Germany) GER | Gökhan Gül (13 January 2015 until 17 April 2015) | 0 | 0 | 0 | 0 | 0 | 0 |
| 16 | MF | (Turkey) TUR | Ridvan Balci (since 18 April 2015) | 1 | 0 | 1 | 0 | 0 | 0 |
| 17 | MF | (Germany) GER | Tobias Weis (since 31 August 2014) | 12 | 2 | 11 | 2 | 1 | 0 |
| 18 | MF | (Germany) GER | Danny Latza | 32 | 1 | 30 | 1 | 2 | 0 |
| 19 | DF | (Germany) GER | Patrick Fabian (captain since January 2015) | 30 | 0 | 29 | 0 | 1 | 0 |
| 20 | MF | (Poland) POL | Piotr Ćwielong | 6 | 0 | 6 | 0 | 0 | 0 |
| 21 | DF | (Germany) GER | Stefano Celozzi (since 14 July 2014) | 33 | 0 | 31 | 0 | 2 | 0 |
| 22 | FW | (Germany) GER | Simon Terodde | 34 | 19 | 32 | 16 | 2 | 3 |
| 23 | MF | (Germany) GER | Florian Jungwirth (until 31 August 2014) | 0 | 0 | 0 | 0 | 0 | 0 |
| 23 | MF | (Germany) GER | Görkem Sağlam (13 January 2015 until 1 February 2015) | 0 | 0 | 0 | 0 | 0 | 0 |
| 23 | MF | (Germany) GER | Thomas Eisfeld (since 2 February 2015) | 11 | 1 | 11 | 1 | 0 | 0 |
| 24 | DF | (Germany) GER | Timo Perthel | 26 | 0 | 25 | 0 | 1 | 0 |
| 25 | MF | (Turkey) TUR | Onur Bulut | 12 | 1 | 12 | 1 | 0 | 0 |
| 27 | FW | (Germany) GER | Selim Gündüz | 15 | 1 | 15 | 1 | 0 | 0 |
| 28 | FW | (Germany) GER | Joel Reinholz | 0 | 0 | 0 | 0 | 0 | 0 |
| 29 | MF | (Germany) GER | Julian Stock | 0 | 0 | 0 | 0 | 0 | 0 |
| 31 | GK | (Germany) GER | Michael Esser | 15 | 0 | 15 | 0 | 0 | 0 |
| 32 | GK | (Germany) GER | Felix Dornebusch | 0 | 0 | 0 | 0 | 0 | 0 |
| 33 | FW | (Finland) FIN | Mikael Forssell (since 29 August 2014) | 17 | 3 | 16 | 3 | 1 | 0 |
| 35 | MF | (Germany) GER | Gazi Siala (since 20 January 2015) | 0 | 0 | 0 | 0 | 0 | 0 |
| 36 | MF | (Curaçao) CUW | Michaël Maria (since 21 February 2015) | 0 | 0 | 0 | 0 | 0 | 0 |
| 37 | DF | (Germany) GER | Lukas Klostermann (until 22 August 2014) | 0 | 0 | 0 | 0 | 0 | 0 |
| 37 | DF | (Germany) GER | Erdinc Karakas (since 13 January 2015) | 0 | 0 | 0 | 0 | 0 | 0 |
| 38 | GK | (Germany) GER | Marius Weeke | 0 | 0 | 0 | 0 | 0 | 0 |
| 39 | MF | (Norway) NOR | Henrik Gulden | 2 | 0 | 1 | 0 | 1 | 0 |
| 41 | FW | (Russia) RUS | Laurynas Kulikas (since 5 July 2014) | 0 | 0 | 0 | 0 | 0 | 0 |

=== Transfers ===
As of 2 February 2015

==== Summer ====
In:

| No. | Pos. | Nation | Player |
|---|---|---|---|
| 4 | DF | GER | Malcolm Cacutalua (on loan form Bayer Leverkusen, previously on loan at Greuther Fürth) |
| 6 | DF | CZE | Jan Šimůnek (from 1. FC Kaiserslautern) |
| 7 | FW | GER | Marco Terrazzino (from SC Freiburg) |
| 8 | MF | FRA | Anthony Losilla (from Dynamo Dresden) |
| 9 | FW | SVK | Stanislav Šesták (from Bursaspor) |
| 11 | FW | AUT | Michael Gregoritsch (on loan from TSG 1899 Hoffenheim) |
| 17 | MF | GER | Tobias Weis (on loan from TSG 1899 Hoffenheim) |
| 21 | DF | GER | Stefano Celozzi (from Eintracht Frankfurt) |
| 22 | FW | GER | Simon Terodde (from 1. FC Union Berlin) |
| 24 | DF | GER | Timo Perthel (from Eintracht Braunschweig) |
| 29 | MF | GER | Julian Stock (from VfL Bochum U-19) |
| 33 | FW | FIN | Mikael Forssell (from Helsingin Jalkapalloklubi) |
| 37 | DF | GER | Lukas Klostermann (from VfL Bochum U-19) |
| 38 | GK | GER | Marius Weeke (from VfL Bochum U-19) |
| 39 | MF | NOR | Henrik Gulden (from VfL Bochum U-19) |
| 41 | FW | RUS | Laurynas Kulikas (from FC St. Pauli) |

Out:

| No. | Pos. | Nation | Player |
|---|---|---|---|
| 4 | DF | GER | Marcel Maltritz (retired) |
| 6 | DF | GER | Lukas Sinkiewicz (to SSV Jahn Regensburg) |
| 7 | MF | GER | Paul Freier (retired) |
| 8 | MF | GER | Christian Tiffert (released) |
| 9 | FW | GER | Richard Sukuta-Pasu (loan return to 1. FC Kaiserslautern) |
| 11 | DF | GER | Felix Bastians (loan return to Hertha BSC) |
| 15 | DF | ISL | Hólmar Örn Eyjólfsson (to Rosenborg BK) |
| 22 | FW | GER | Mirkan Aydın (to Eskişehirspor) |
| 23 | MF | GER | Florian Jungwirth (to SV Darmstadt 98) |
| 24 | DF | GER | Carsten Rothenbach (released) |
| 26 | DF | GER | Jonas Acquistapace (to AC Omonia) |
| 28 | FW | GER | Sven Kreyer (to Rot-Weiss Essen) |
| 34 | GK | GER | Jonas Ermes (to Alemannia Aachen) |
| 35 | GK | GER | Sebastian Brune (to SV Waldhof Mannheim) |
| 37 | DF | GER | Lukas Klostermann (to RB Leipzig) |
| -- | MF | GER | Sören Bertram (to Hallescher FC, previously on loan) |
| -- | FW | FRA | Smail Morabit (to 1. FC Heidenheim, previously on loan) |

==== Winter ====
In:

| No. | Pos. | Nation | Player |
|---|---|---|---|
| 13 | DF | GER | Felix Bastians (Free agent) |
| 15 | DF | GER | Nicolas Abdat (from VfL Bochum U-19) |
| 23 | MF | GER | Thomas Eisfeld (on loan from Fulham F.C.) |

Out:

| No. | Pos. | Nation | Player |
