= 2011–12 TSG 1899 Hoffenheim season =

TSG 1899 Hoffenheim
2011–12 season
- Bundesliga: 11th
- DFB-Pokal: Quarter-final
Home colours	Away colours	Third colours

The 2011–12 TSG 1899 Hoffenheim season started on 31 July against Germania Windeck.

== Competitions ==
=== Bundesliga ===
==== League table ====
Pos	Team	Pld	W	D	L	GF	GA	GD	Pts
9	Werder Bremen	34	11	9	14	49	58	−9	42
10	1. FC Nürnberg	34	12	6	16	38	49	−11	42
11	1899 Hoffenheim	34	10	11	13	41	47	−6	41
12	SC Freiburg	34	10	10	14	45	61	−16	40
13	FSV Mainz 05	34	9	12	13	47	51	−4	39

Source: kicker
Rules for classification: 1) points; 2) goal difference; 3) number of goals scored.

==== Matches ====
Win Draw Loss Postponed

6 August 1	Hannover 96	2–1	1899 Hoffenheim	Hanover
15:30 CEST (UTC+02)	Schlaudraff 15'; Abdellaoue 30' (pen.); Pogatetz (yellow card) 36'; Schulz (yellow card) 42'	Match Report	Salihović 18' (pen.); Rudy (yellow card) 23'; Obasi (yellow card) 55'	Stadium: AWD-Arena; Attendance: 40,315; Referee: Thorsten Kinhöfer; Man of the Match: Jan Schlaudraff

13 August 2	1899 Hoffenheim	1–0	Borussia Dortmund	Sinsheim
15:30 CEST (UTC+02)	Salihović (yellow card) 5', (goal) 9'; Beck (yellow card) 79'; Mlapa (yellow card) 90+1'; Obasi (yellow card) 90+2'	Match Report	Götze (yellow card) 38'	Stadium: Rhein-Neckar Arena; Attendance: 30,155; Referee: Deniz Aytekin; Man of the Match: Rudy

20 August 3	FC Augsburg	0–2	1899 Hoffenheim	Augsburg
15:30 CEST (UTC+02)	De Roeck (yellow card) 67'	Match Report	Babel 5'; Rudy (yellow card) 65'; Salihović 75' (pen.)	Stadium: SGL arena Attendance: 30,004; Referee: Markus Wingenbach; Man of the Match: Tom Starke

27 August 4	1899 Hoffenheim	1–2	Werder Bremen	Sinsheim
15:30 CEST (UTC+02)	Roberto Firmino 37'	Match Report	Arnautović 38'; Rosenberg 83'; Ekici (yellow card) 85'	Stadium: Rhein-Neckar Arena; Attendance: 28,750; Referee: Babak Rafati; Man of the Match: Tim Wiese

10 September 5	Mainz 05	0–4	1899 Hoffenheim	Mainz
15:30 CEST		Match Report	Roberto Firmino 16'; Babel 45+2' (pen.), 74'; Noveski 85' (o.g.)	Stadium: Coface Arena; Attendance: 31,500; Referee: Guido Winkmann

17 September 6	1899 Hoffenheim	3–1	VfL Wolfsburg	Sinsheim
15:30 CEST	Babel 20'; Roberto Firmino 24', 85', (yellow card) 24'; Beck (yellow card) 41'; Vorsah (yellow card) 78'	Match Report	Josué (yellow card) 64'; Dejagah 67'; Hitz (red card) 80'	Stadium: Rhein-Neckar Arena; Attendance: 26,850; Referee: Marco Fritz; Man of the Match: Roberto Firmino

25 September 7	1. FC Köln	2–0	1899 Hoffenheim	Cologne
15:30 CEST (UTC+02)	Sereno (yellow card) 18'; Jajalo 20'; Podolski 64'	Match Report	Babel (yellow card) 14'; Compper (yellow card) 75'	Stadium: RheinEnergieStadion; Attendance: 45,500; Referee: Peter Sippel; Man of the Match: Lukas Podolski

1 October 8	1899 Hoffenheim	0–0	Bayern Munich	Sinsheim
15:30 CEST (UTC+02)	Musona (yellow card) 81'	Match Report	Tymoshchuk (yellow card) 42'; Schweinsteiger (yellow card) 62'; Lahm (yellow card) 68'; Kroos (yellow card) 77'	Stadium: Rhein-Neckar Arena; Attendance: 30,150; Referee: Thorsten Kinhöfer; Man of the Match: Marvin Compper

15 October 9	VfB Stuttgart	2–0	1899 Hoffenheim	Stuttgart
15:30 CEST (UTC+02)	Pogrebnyak (yellow card) 23', (goal) 77' (pen.); Harnik (yellow card) 34'; Okazaki 48'; Boulahrouz (yellow card) 88'	Match Report	Obasi (yellow card) 43'	Stadium: Mercedes-Benz Arena; Attendance: 55,000; Referee: Babak Rafati; Man of the Match: Pavel Pogrebnyak

22 October 10	1899 Hoffenheim	1–0	Borussia Mönchengladbach	Sinsheim
15:30 CEST (UTC+02)	Ibišević 56'; Beck (yellow card) 90+1'	Match Report	Stranzl (yellow card) 58'; Jantschke (yellow card) 81'; Dante (yellow card) 85'	Stadium: Rhein-Neckar Arena; Attendance: 30,150; Referee: Christian Dingert; Man of the Match: Vedad Ibišević

29 October 11	Schalke 04	3–1	1899 Hoffenheim	Gelsenkirchen
15:30 CEST (UTC+02)	Raúl 28'; Jones (yellow card) 69'; Huntelaar 73' (pen.), 76'	Match Report	Beck (yellow card) 43'; Ibišević 63'; Williams (yellow card) 89'	Stadium: Veltins-Arena; Attendance: 60,384; Referee: Tobias Welz; Man of the Match: Lewis Holtby

5 November 12	1899 Hoffenheim	1–1	1. FC Kaiserslautern	Sinsheim
15:30 CET (UTC+01)	Ibišević 33', (yellow card) 57'; Salihović (yellow card) 57'; Ibertsberger (yellow card) 66'; Williams (yellow card) 68'; Roberto Firmino (yellow card) 88'	Match Report	Kouemaha 73'; Bugera (yellow card) 75'	Stadium: Rhein-Neckar Arena; Attendance: 30,150; Referee: Günter Perl; Man of the Match: Dorge Kouemaha

20 November 13	Hamburger SV	2–0	1899 Hoffenheim	Hamburg
17:30 CET (UTC+01)	Guerrero 25'; Jansen 65'	Match Report	Rudy (yellow card) 39'; Compper (yellow card) 43'; Beck (yellow card) 63'	Stadium: Imtech Arena; Attendance: 46,237; Referee: Marco Fritz; Man of the Match: Paolo Guerrero

26 November 2011 14	1899 Hoffenheim	1–1	SC Freiburg	Sinsheim
15:30 CET (UTC+01)	Roberto Firmino 24'; Compper (yellow card) 53'; Williams (yellow card) 85'	Match Report	Putsila (yellow card) 34'; Makiadi (yellow card) 70'; Schuster (yellow card) 86'; Dembélé 90'	Stadium: Rhein-Neckar Arena; Attendance: 28,250; Referee: Deniz Aytekin; Man of the Match: Oliver Baumann

2 December 2011 15	Bayer Leverkusen	2–0	1899 Hoffenheim	Leverkusen
20:30 CET (UTC+01)	Derdiyok 11', (yellow card) 67'; Castro (yellow card) 52'; Sam 79'	Match Report	Babel (yellow card) 23'; Salihović (yellow card) 86'	Stadium: BayArena; Attendance: 25,948; Referee: Wolfgang Stark; Man of the Match: Lars Bender

10 December 2011 16	1. FC Nürnberg	0–2	1899 Hoffenheim	Nuremberg
15:30 CET (UTC+01)	Eigler (yellow card) 22'; Pekhart (yellow card) 33'; Simons (yellow card) 37'; Chandler (red card) 43'	Match Report	Babel (yellow card) 8'; Ibišević (yellow card) 34', (goal) 39', 56'; Beck (yellow card) 79'; Compper (red card) 90+1'	Stadium: Easy-Credit-Stadion; Attendance: 35,389; Referee: Jochen Drees; Man of the Match: Vedad Ibišević

17 December 2011 17	1899 Hoffenheim	1–1	Hertha BSC	Sinsheim
15:30 CET (UTC+01)	Salihović 21', (yellow card) 32'; Beck (yellow card) 34'; Vorsah (red card) 63'; Musona (yellow card) 83'; Rudy (yellow card) 90+1'	Match Report	Raffael (red card) 31'; Hubník (yellow card) 76', (goal) 90+1'	Stadium: Rhein-Neckar Arena; Attendance: 25,550; Referee: Peter Sippel; Man of the Match: Thomas Kraft

21 January 2012 18	1899 Hoffenheim	0–0	Hannover 96	Sinsheim
15:30 CET (UTC+01)	Beck (yellow card) 59'		Rausch (yellow card) 90+1'	Stadium: Rhein-Neckar Arena; Attendance: 24,800

28 January 2012 19	Borussia Dortmund	3–1	1899 Hoffenheim	Dortmund
15:30 CET (UTC+01)	Kagawa 16', 55'; Bender (yellow card) 28'; Großkreutz 31'		Weis (yellow card) 20'; Braafheid (yellow card) 23'; Johnson 63'; Beck (yellow card) 67'; Babel (yellow card) 85'	Stadium: Signal Iduna Park; Attendance: 80,500

4 February 2012 20	1899 Hoffenheim	2–2	FC Augsburg	Sinsheim
15:30 CET (UTC+01)	Williams (yellow card) 23'; Salihović (yellow card) 26', (goal) 51' (pen.); Mlapa 38'; Babel (yellow card) 86'; Vestergaard (yellow card) 90'		Mölders 31'; Langkamp (yellow card) 42', (goal) 72'; Baier (yellow card) 45'	Stadium: Rhein-Neckar Arena

11 February 2012 21	Werder Bremen	1–1	1899 Hoffenheim	Bremen
15:30 CET (UTC+01)	Ekici (yellow card) 45'; Wiese (yellow card) 63'; Papastathopoulos (yellow card) 82'; Arnautović 89'		Vestergaard 4', (yellow card) 36'; Weis (yellow card) 54'; Roberto Firmino (yellow card) 88'; Compper (yellow card) 90+3'	Stadium: Weserstadion

17 February 2012 22	1899 Hoffenheim	1–1	Mainz 05	Sinsheim
20:30 CET (UTC+01)	Noveski 9' (o.g.); Salihović (yellow card) 89'		Zidan 29'; Zabavník (yellow card) 81'	Stadium: Rhein-Neckar Arena; Attendance: 24,300

25 February 2012 23	VfL Wolfsburg	1–2	1899 Hoffenheim	Wolfsburg
15:30 CET (UTC+01)	Helmes 69' (pen.); Sio (yellow card) 82'; Russ (yellow card) 88'		Roberto Firmino 2'; Williams (yellow card) 43'; Schipplock 85'	Stadium: Volkswagen-Arena

4 March 2012 24	1899 Hoffenheim	1–1	1. FC Köln	Sinsheim
17:30 CET (UTC+01)	Compper 33'; Vestergaard (yellow card) 67'; Beck (yellow card) 74'; Weis (yellow card) 79'		Eichner (yellow card) 24'; Lanig (yellow card) 56'; Podolski 81'	Stadium: Rhein-Neckar Arena; Attendance: 29,250

10 March 2012 25	Bayern Munich	7–1	1899 Hoffenheim	Munich
15:30 CET (UTC+01)	Gómez 5', 35', 48'; Robben 12' (pen.), 29'; Kroos 18'; Ribéry 58'; Luiz Gustavo 85' (o.g.)		Vukčević (yellow card) 72'	Stadium: Allianz Arena; Attendance: 69,000

6 March 2012 26	1899 Hoffenheim	1–2	VfB Stuttgart	Sinsheim
20:30 CET (UTC+01)	Salihović 74' (pen.); Beck (yellow card) 90+1'		Ibišević 8', 43', (yellow card) 89'; Kuzmanović (yellow card) 41'	Stadium: Rhein-Neckar Arena; Attendance: 30,150

24 March 2012 27	Borussia Mönchengladbach	1–2	1899 Hoffenheim	Mönchengladbach
15:30 CET (UTC+01)	Marx (yellow card) 29'; Reus 38'; Brouwers (yellow card) 89'; Wendt (yellow card) 90+3'		Salihović (yellow card) 39'; Compper (yellow card) 57'; Roberto Firmino 77', (yellow card) 77'; Vukčević 79'	Stadium: Borussia-Park; Attendance: 52,796

1 April 2012 28	1899 Hoffenheim	1–1	Schalke 04	Sinsheim
	Rudy (yellow card) 19'; Salihović 30' (pen.); Vorsah (yellow card) 71'		Jones (yellow card) 23'; Unnerstall (yellow card) 29'; Papadopoulos (yellow card) 39'; Matip (yellow card) 42'; Huntelaar 80' (pen.)	Stadium: Rhein-Neckar Arena; Attendance: 30,150

7 April 2012 29	1. FC Kaiserslautern	1–2	1899 Hoffenheim	Mönchengladbach
	Rodnei (yellow card) 48'; Tiffert (yellow card) 78'; Bugera (yellow card) 86'; De Wit (yellow card) 90'		Salihović (yellow card) 20', (goal) 26' (pen.); Vukčević 71'; Weis (yellow card) 78'	Stadium: Fritz-Walter-Stadion; Attendance: 40,296

11 April 2012 30	1899 Hoffenheim	4–0	Hamburger SV	Sinsheim
	Vestergaard 17'; Schipplock (yellow card) 23', (goal) 59'; Salihović 25' (pen.); Weis (yellow card) 31'; Johnson 51'		Iličević (yellow card) 34'; Drobný (yellow card) 45+2'; Rincón (yellow card) 77'	Stadium: Rhein-Neckar Arena; Attendance: 27,000

15 April 2012 31	SC Freiburg	1–1	1899 Hoffenheim	Freiburg
	Dembélé (yellow card) 10'		Rudy (yellow card) 56'	Stadium: Badenova-Stadion; Attendance: 23,500

21 April 2012 32	1899 Hoffenheim	0–1	Bayer Leverkusen	Sinsheim
	Beck (yellow card) 63'		Schürrle 79'	Stadium: Rhein-Neckar Arena; Attendance: 28,150

28 April 2012 33	1899 Hoffenheim	2–3	1. FC Nürnberg	Sinsheim
15:30 CEST	Beck 22', (yellow card) 37'; Braafheid 88'		Pekhart 9', 71'; Chandler (yellow card) 42'; Didavi 45'	Stadium: Rhein-Neckar Arena

5 May 2012 34	Hertha BSC	3–1	1899 Hoffenheim	Berlin
15:30 CEST	Ben-Hatira 14', 78'; Perdedaj (yellow card) 27'; Lasogga (yellow card) 29'; Raffael 90+3'		Babel (yellow card) 41' (yellow-red card) 42'; Kaiser (yellow card) 65'; Mlapa (yellow card) 70'; Compper 85'	Stadium: Olympiastadion; Attendance: 51,837

=== DFB-Pokal ===
31 July 2011 Round 1	Germania Windeck	1–3 (a.e.t.)	1899 Hoffenheim	Windeck
16:00 CEST	Buchholz 36'	Match Report	Salihović 51' (pen.); Johnson 98'; Babel 116'	Stadium: Sportpark Höhenberg; Attendance: 2,588; Referee: Bastian Dankert

25 October 2011 Round 2	1899 Hoffenheim	2–1	1. FC Köln	Sinsheim
20:30 CET	Obasi 40'; Musona 50'	Match Report	Jajalo 6'	Stadium: Rhein-Neckar Arena; Attendance: 16,000; Referee: Knut Kircher

20 December 2011 Round 3	1899 Hoffenheim	2–1	FC Augsburg	Sinsheim
20:30 CET	Salihović 23'; Ibišević 49'	Match Report	Oehrl 36'	Stadium: Rhein-Neckar Arena; Attendance: 10,000; Referee: Thorsten Kinhöfer

8 February 2012 Quarter-final	1899 Hoffenheim	0–1	Greuther Fürth	Sinsheim
19:00 CET	Compper (red card) 36'; Lakić (yellow card) 68'		Zillner (yellow card) 35'; Occéan 44', (yellow card) 57'; Schmidtgal (yellow card) 45'; Asamoah (yellow card) 61'	Stadium: Rhein-Neckar Arena; Attendance: 14,000

== Players ==
=== First-team squad ===
Squad at end of season

Note: Flags indicate national team as defined under FIFA eligibility rules; some limited exceptions apply. Players may hold more than one non-FIFA nationality.

No.	Pos.	Nation	Player
1	GK	GER	Daniel Haas
2	DF	GER	Andreas Beck
3	DF	GER	Matthias Jaissle
4	DF	GER	Stefan Thesker
5	DF	GER	Marvin Compper
6	MF	GER	Sebastian Rudy
7	MF	GER	Boris Vukčević (Note: Vukčević was born in Osijek, Yugoslavia (now Croatia), but also qualifies to represent Germany internationally and has represented them at U-19, U-20 and U-21 level.)
8	FW	ZIM	Knowledge Musona
9	FW	GER	Sven Schipplock
10	MF	NED	Ryan Babel
13	MF	USA	Danny Williams (Note: Williams was born in Karlsruhe, West Germany (now Germany), and represented them at U-15 level, but also qualifies to represent the United States internationally through his father and made his international debut for the United States in October 2011.)
15	FW	GER	Peniel Mlapa (Note: Mlapa was born in Lomé, Togo, but was raised in Germany and represented them at U-19 and U-21 level before making his international debut for Togo in June 2017.)
16	DF	USA	Fabian Johnson (Note: Johnson was born in Munich, West Germany (now Germany), and represented them at every youth level between U-17 and U-21, but also qualifies to represent the United States internationally through his father and made his international debut for the United States in November 2011.)
17	MF	GER	Tobias Weis
21	MF	GER	Dominik Kaiser
22	MF	BRA	Roberto Firmino

No.	Pos.	Nation	Player
23	MF	BIH	Sejad Salihović
25	DF	GHA	Isaac Vorsah
26	DF	AUT	Andreas Ibertsberger
27	MF	LIE	Sandro Wieser
28	DF	NED	Edson Braafheid (Note: Braafheid was born in Paramaribo, Suriname, but also qualifies to represent the Netherlands internationally and represented them at U-21 level before making his international debut for the Netherlands in February 2009.)
29	DF	DEN	Jannik Vestergaard
30	GK	BEL	Koen Casteels
31	DF	GER	Tobias Strobl
32	MF	USA	Joe Gyau
33	GK	GER	Tom Starke
34	FW	GER	Denis Thomalla
35	DF	GER	Kevin Conrad
37	DF	GER	Manuel Gulde
39	FW	CRO	Srđan Lakić
41	DF	GER	Philipp Klingmann

=== Left club during season ===
Note: Flags indicate national team as defined under FIFA eligibility rules; some limited exceptions apply. Players may hold more than one non-FIFA nationality.

No.	Pos.	Nation	Player
11	MF	ISL	Gylfi Sigurðsson (on loan to Swansea City)
14	DF	CRO	Josip Šimunić (Note: Šimunić was born in Canberra, Australia, but also qualified to represent Croatia and Bosnia and Herzegovina internationally through his parents and made his international debut for Croatia in November 2001.) (to Dinamo Zagreb)
18	FW	GHA	Prince Tagoe (to Bursaspor)
19	FW	BIH	Vedad Ibišević (to Stuttgart)

No.	Pos.	Nation	Player
20	FW	NGA	Chinedu Obasi (on loan to Schalke 04)
36	MF	ARG	Franco Zuculini (on loan to Real Zaragoza)
38	FW	GER	Kai Herdling (on loan to Philadelphia Union)

== Statistics ==
=== Appearances and goals ===
No.	Pos	Nat	Player	Total		Bundesliga		DFB-Pokal	
No.	Pos	Nat	Player	Apps	Goals	Apps	Goals	Apps	Goals
Goalkeepers
1	GK	(Germany) GER	Daniel Haas	2	0	1	0	1	0
30	GK	(Belgium) BEL	Koen Casteels	0	0	0	0	0	0
33	GK	(Germany) GER	Tom Starke	36	0	33	0	3	0
Defenders
2	DF	(Germany) GER	Andreas Beck	35	1	31	1	4	0
3	DF	(Germany) GER	Matthias Jaissle	0	0	0	0	0	0
4	DF	(Germany) GER	Stefan Thesker	0	0	0	0	0	0
5	DF	(Germany) GER	Marvin Compper	33	2	30	2	3	0
6	DF	(Germany) GER	Sebastian Rudy	29	0	28	0	1	0
14	DF	(Croatia) CRO	Josip Šimunić	0	0	0	0	0	0
25	DF	(Ghana) GHA	Isaac Vorsah	23	0	21	0	2	0
26	DF	(Austria) AUT	Andreas Ibertsberger	2	0	1	0	1	0
28	DF	(Netherlands) NED	Edson Braafheid	24	1	21	1	3	0
29	DF	(Denmark) DEN	Jannik Vestergaard	26	2	23	2	3	0
32	DF	(United States) USA	Joseph-Claude Gyau	1	0	0	0	1	0
35	DF	(Germany) GER	Kevin Conrad	0	0	0	0	0	0
37	DF	(Germany) GER	Manuel Gulde	0	0	0	0	0	0
Midfielders
8	MF	(Zimbabwe) ZIM	Knowledge Musona	17	1	16	0	1	1
13	MF	(United States) USA	Danny Williams	27	0	24	0	3	0
17	MF	(Germany) GER	Tobias Weis	14	0	13	0	1	0
21	MF	(Germany) GER	Dominik Kaiser	10	0	9	0	1	0
22	MF	(Brazil) BRA	Roberto Firmino	33	7	30	7	3	0
23	MF	(Bosnia and Herzegovina) BIH	Sejad Salihović	26	11	23	9	3	2
27	MF	(Liechtenstein) LIE	Sandro Wieser	1	0	1	0	0	0
31	MF	(Germany) GER	Tobias Strobl	2	0	1	0	1	0
Forwards
7	FW	(Germany) GER	Boris Vukčević	19	2	18	2	1	0
9	FW	(Germany) GER	Sven Schipplock	23	2	20	2	3	0
10	FW	(Netherlands) NED	Ryan Babel	35	5	31	4	4	1
15	FW	(Togo) TOG	Peniel Mlapa	28	1	24	1	4	0
16	FW	(United States) USA	Fabian Johnson	33	3	29	2	4	1
18	FW	(Ghana) GHA	Prince Tagoe	3	0	2	0	1	0
34	FW	(Germany) GER	Denis Thomalla	0	0	0	0	0	0
39	FW	(Croatia) CRO	Srđan Lakić	8	0	7	0	1	0
Players transferred out during the season
11	MF	(Iceland) ISL	Gylfi Sigurðsson	7	0	7	0	0	0
19	FW	(Bosnia and Herzegovina) BIH	Vedad Ibišević	11	6	10	5	1	1
20	FW	(Nigeria) NGA	Chinedu Obasi	15	1	13	0	2	1

Last updated: 27 November 2021
Source: DFB
