= Arild Gulden =

Norwegian footballer and handball player (1941–2024)

- Born: 4 December 1941; Oslo, Norway
- Died: 9 October 2024 (aged 82); Bærum, Norway
- Education: University of St. Gallen
- Children: Bjørn Gulden
- Handball career
- Sport: Handball

Senior clubs
- Years: Team
- Around 1958: Sportsklubben Arild
- 1963–1970: Grasshoppers
- 1972–1977: Grasshoppers
National team
Years	Team	Apps	(Gls)
1958–1971	Norway	52	(65)
Association football career
- Position: Midfielder
Senior career*
Years	Team	Apps	(Gls)
1959–1972	Lyn		
1960s	Grasshoppers		
International career
1963–1965	Norway	9	(0)
- * Club domestic league appearances and goals

Arild Gulden (4 December 1941 – 9 October 2024) was a Norwegian international handball and football player.

== Handball career ==
Gulden made his Norway men's national handball team debut in 1958, and played 52 matches at that level from 1958 to 1971. He participated at the 1961, 1964 and 1967 World Men's Handball Championship.

With the club SK Arild he won the Norwegian indoor championship in 1958.

He played between 1963 and 1970 and again between 1972 and 1977 for the Grasshopper Club Zürich. He won nine indoor championships.

Gulden was awarded the Håndballstatuetten trophy from the Norwegian Handball Federation in 1999.

== Football career ==
Gulden was capped nine times while with team Norway. He was with FK Lyn when they won the 1964 1. divisjon.

He played only in the Norwegian winter break for Grasshopper Club Zürich. He won with the Grasshoppers nine indoor championships.

== Personal life ==
Gulden was born on 4 December 1941. His son Bjørn Gulden is a former professional footballer, and chief executive of Adidas.

== Death ==
Gulden died in Bærum on 9 October 2024, at the age of 82.
