= Bjørn Gulden =

Norwegian businessman and footballer

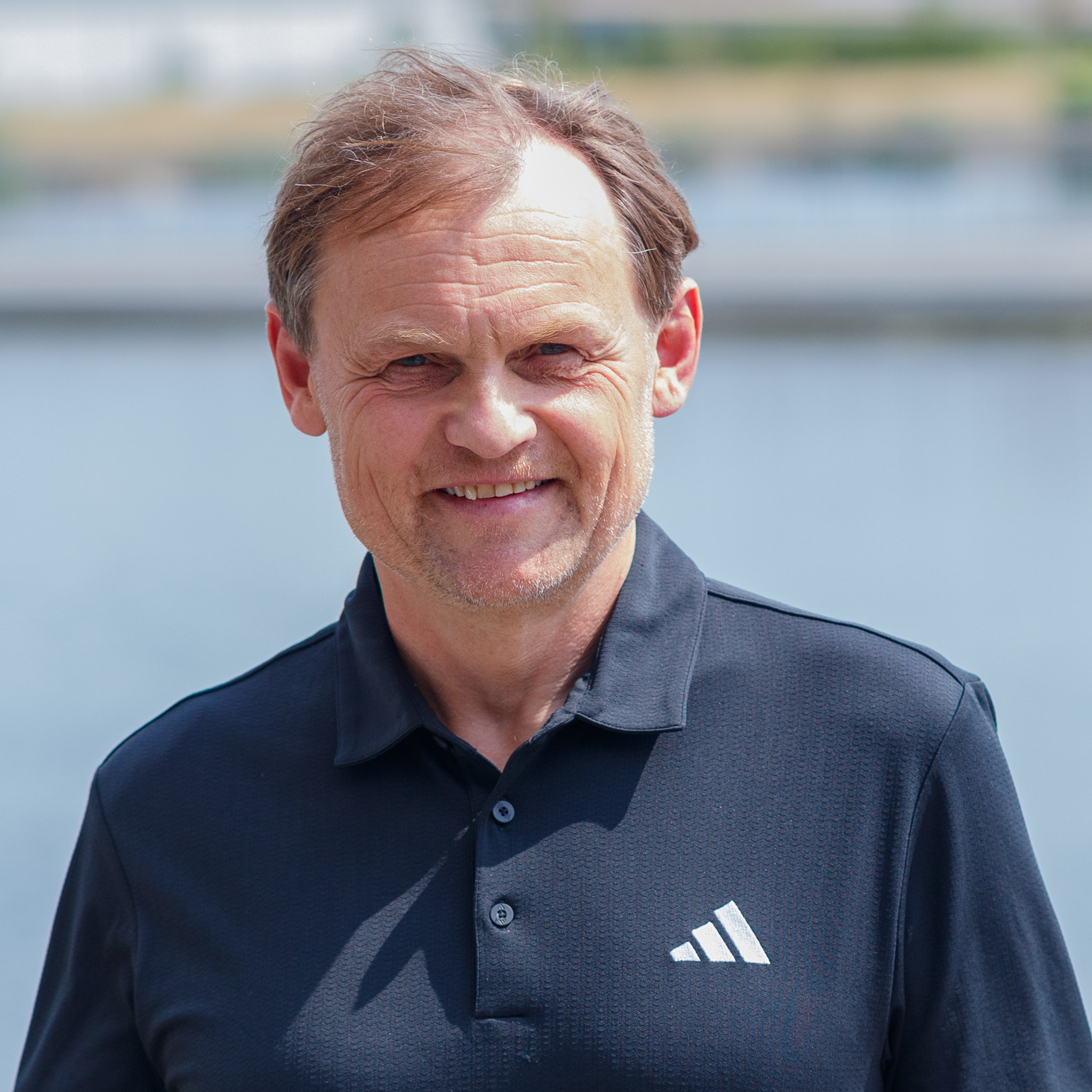
- Bjørn Gulden at the German Women Football Team National Day
- Born: Bjørn Gulden; June 4, 1965 (age 61); Zurich, Switzerland
- Education: University of Stavanger; Babson College
- Occupation: Business executive
- Years active: 2023–present (at Adidas)
- Title: CEO of Adidas (2023–present)
- Children: Henrik Gulden; Noah Gulden; Scott Gulden
- Parent: Arild Gulden
- Website: adidas.com

Bjørn Gulden (born 4 June 1965) is a Norwegian businessman and former professional football player. Since January 2023, he has been the CEO of Adidas. Previously, he used to be the CEO of Puma and Pandora. He was Fortune's Businessperson of the Year in 2019.

== Early life and education ==
Gulden was born in Zurich, Switzerland. He earned a Bachelors of Business Administration from the University of Stavanger and a Master of Business Administration from Babson College.

== Football career ==
Gulden grew up in Hallingdal and is the son of Arild Gulden, a former Norwegian national football and handball player. He is father of Henrik Gulden, Noah Gulden and Scott Gulden.

In his younger years, Bjørn played for the clubs Geilo and Gol, before he went to the Strømsgodset Toppfotball team in 1983.

He turned professional in 1984, playing for 1. FC Nürnberg for the 1984–85 2. Bundesliga season. In 1986, he joined Bryne FK winning the cup championship in 1987. He retired in 1988 due to a knee injury.

== Business career ==
Gulden began his career at Adidas in 1992 until 1999, when he became an executive at Helly Hansen. In 2000, he became the managing director of Deichmann SE and was CEO of Deichmann's U.S. subsidiary Rack Room Shoes. Between 2012 and 2013, he served as the CEO of Pandora, a Danish jewelry brand, and remained a board member until 2018. In 2013, he became CEO of German design corporation Puma.

He became CEO of Adidas on 1 January 2023, taking over after Kasper Rørsted.

== Memberships ==
Gulden serves as the Chairman of the Board of Directors, Salling Group A/S and is a member of the Supervisory Board of Tchibo GmbH.
