= Ronny Philp =

Romanian-German footballer

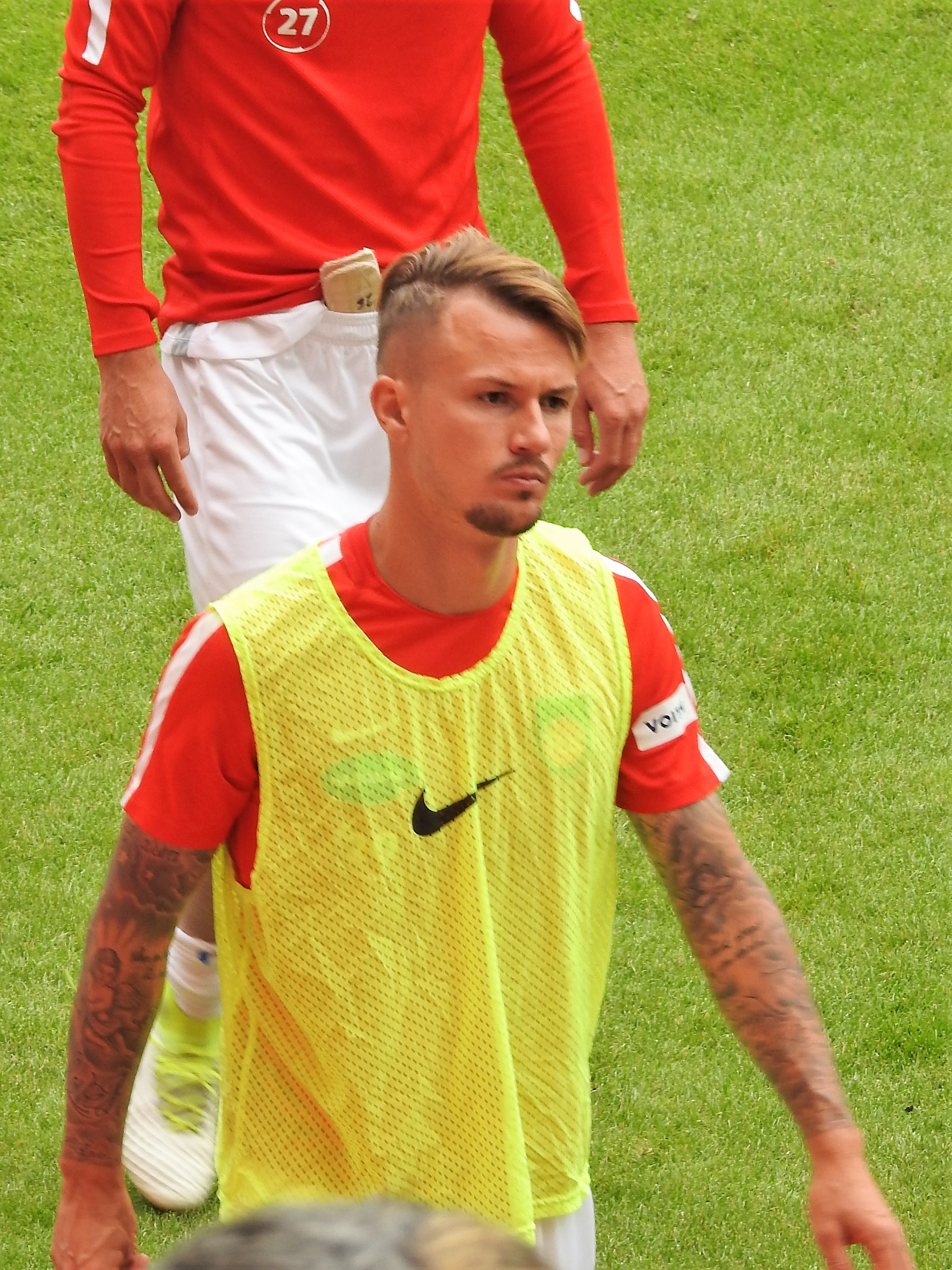
- Philp with 1. FC Heidenheim in 2017

Personal information
- Date of birth: 28 January 1989 (age 37)
- Place of birth: Sibiu, Romania
- Height: 1.83 m (6 ft 0 in)
- Position: Defender

Youth career
- –2002: TSV Burgfarrnbach
- 2002–2008: Greuther Fürth

Senior career*
Years	Team	Apps	(Gls)
2008–2011	Greuther Fürth II	72	(2)
2011–2012	Jahn Regensburg	36	(1)
2012–2015	FC Augsburg	14	(0)
2015	→ Greuther Fürth (loan)	5	(0)
2015–2018	1. FC Heidenheim	32	(0)
2018–2021	1. FC Schweinfurt	15	(0)
Total		174	(3)
- * Club domestic league appearances and goals

Ronny Philp (born 28 January 1989) is a Romanian former professional footballer who played as a defender. Philp holds German nationality.

== Career ==
Philp was born in Sibiu, Romania, and made his professional debut in the opening fixture of the 2011–12 3. Liga season for Jahn Regensburg at home to SV Babelsberg 03.

He retired from playing in February 2021 due to injury problems and started a trading apprenticeship at former club Greuther Fürth.
