= Mohamed Gouaida =

Tunisian footballer (born 1993)

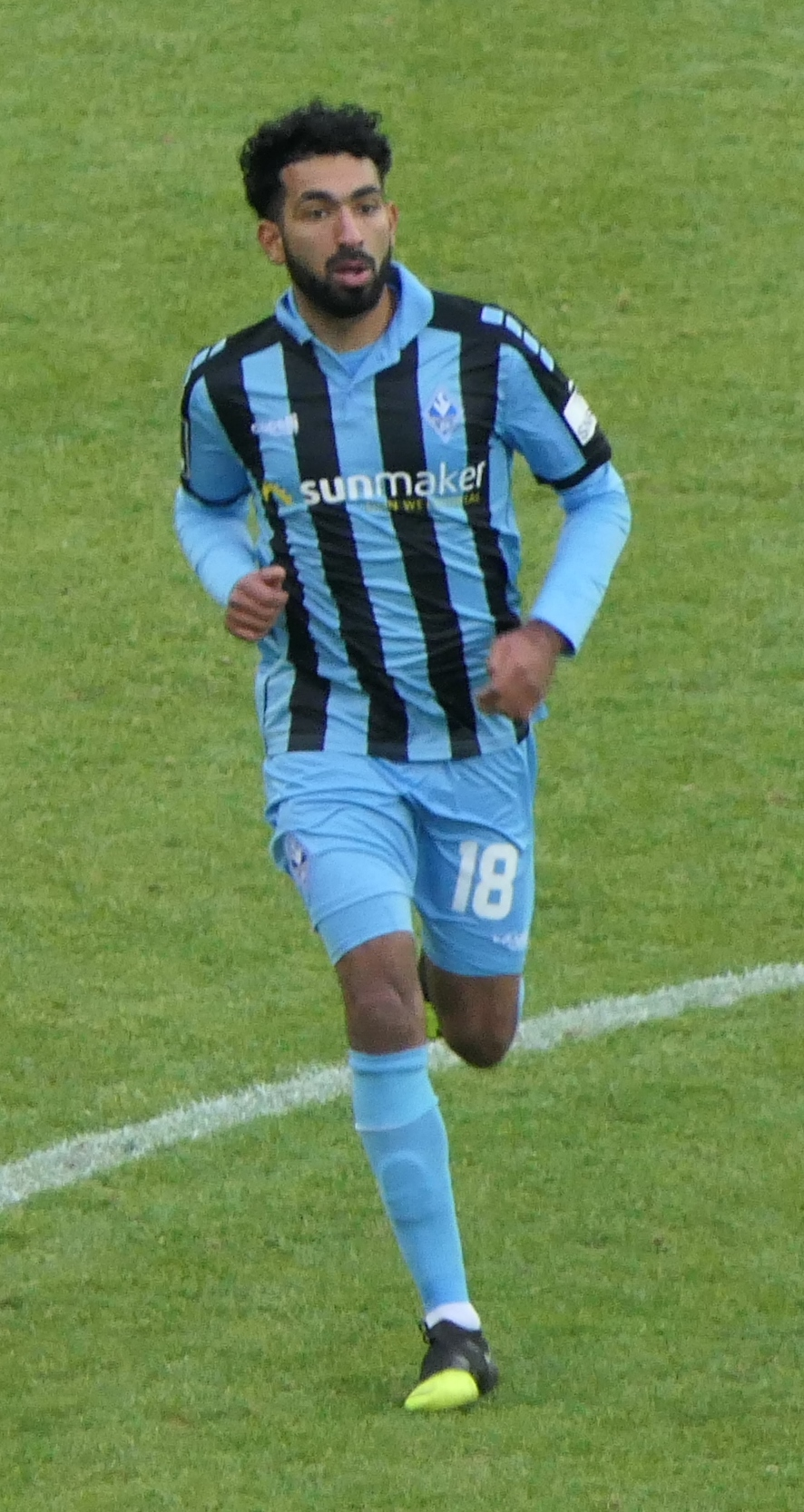
- Gouaida in 2019

Personal information
- Date of birth: 15 May 1993 (age 33)
- Place of birth: Sfax, Tunisia
- Height: 1.78 m (5 ft 10 in)
- Position: Winger

Team information
- Current team: Virton
- Number: 30

Youth career
- Strasbourg
- 2011–2012: SC Freiburg

Senior career*
Years	Team	Apps	(Gls)
2012–2014	SC Freiburg II	39	(4)
2014–2018	Hamburger SV II	59	(17)
2014–2017	Hamburger SV	11	(0)
2015–2016	→ Karlsruher SC (loan)	17	(0)
2016–2017	→ St. Gallen (loan)	13	(0)
2018–2019	SV Sandhausen	3	(0)
2019–2022	Waldhof Mannheim	48	(1)
2022–	Virton	3	(0)

International career^{‡}
2015–	Tunisia	3	(0)
- * Club domestic league appearances and goals as of 18 November 2022 ‡ National team caps and goals as of 15 May 2017

Mohamed Gouaida (born 15 May 1993) is a Tunisian professional footballer who plays as a winger for Belgian club Virton.

== Club career ==
Gouaida joined Hamburger SV in 2014 from SC Freiburg. He made his Bundesliga debut at 23 November 2014 in the Nordderby against Werder Bremen. He played the entire game, which ended in a 2–0 home win for Hamburg.
