= Tobias Weis =

German retired footballer (born 1985)

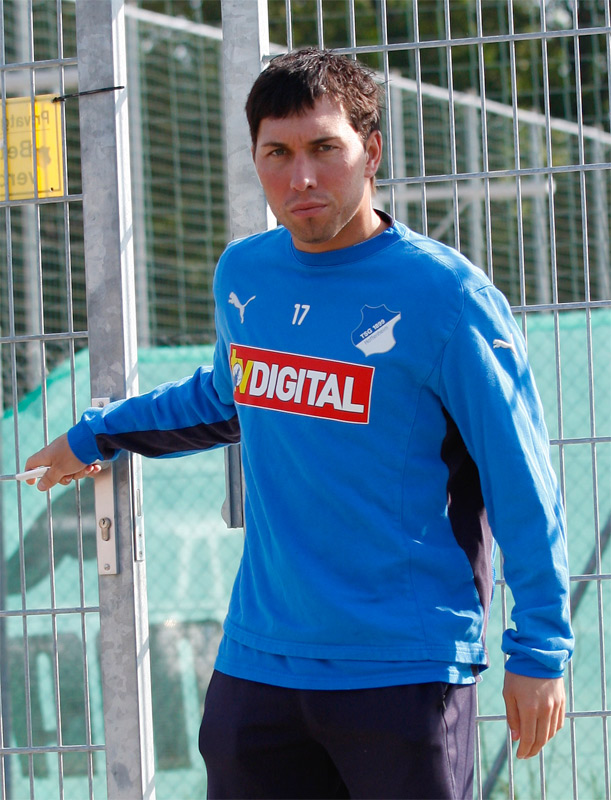

Personal information
- Full name: Tobias Weis
- Date of birth: 30 July 1985 (age 41)
- Place of birth: Schwäbisch Hall, West Germany
- Height: 1.70 m (5 ft 7 in)
- Position: Midfielder

Youth career
- 1990–1993: SC Bibersfeld
- 1993–1996: Sportfreunde Schwäbisch Hall
- 1996–2004: VfB Stuttgart

Senior career*
Years	Team	Apps	(Gls)
2002–2007	VfB Stuttgart II	75	(9)
2007–2012	TSG 1899 Hoffenheim II	6	(0)
2007–2015	TSG 1899 Hoffenheim	109	(3)
2014	→ Eintracht Frankfurt (loan)	4	(0)
2014–2015	→ VfL Bochum (loan)	11	(2)
2014	→ VfL Bochum II (loan)	1	(0)
2015–2016	VfL Bochum	4	(0)
2017–2018	FSV 08 Bissingen	0	(0)
2018–2019	TSV Weilimdorf	16	(0)
Total		226	(14)

International career^{‡}
2008–2009	Germany	1	(0)
- * Club domestic league appearances and goals as of 24 October 2019 ‡ National team caps and goals as of 2 June 2009

Tobias Weis (born 30 July 1985) is a German retired footballer.

== Club career ==
Weis began his career 1990 with SC Bibersfeld and joined after three years in summer 1993 to Sportfreunde Schwäbisch Hall. He played for SF Schwäbisch Hall until July 1996 here was scouted from VfB Stuttgart, after eight years on youth side was promoted to the reserve team. Weis played three seasons with VfB Stuttgart II in the Regionalliga Süd, before moving to Hoffenheim in July 2007.

For Hoffenheim, Eintracht Frankfurt and VfL Bochum Weis played almost 130 matches in the top two levels of the German league pyramid.

== International career ==
Weis got his first call up to the Germany national team for a friendly against England in late 2008. He played his first match for Germany in a friendly against United Arab Emirates on 2 June 2009. He was substituted on in the 66th minute for Thomas Hitzlsperger. No other cap was later won so this match was his only appearance for the Mannschaft.

== Career statistics ==
As of 12 August 2016

Club	Season	League			Cup		Other		Total		Ref.
Club	Season	League	Apps	Goals	Apps	Goals	Apps	Goals	Apps	Goals	Ref.
Stuttgart II	2003–04	Regionalliga Süd	6	0	—				6	0	
Stuttgart II	2004–05	Regionalliga Süd	15	4	—				15	4	
Stuttgart II	2005–06	Regionalliga Süd	27	1	—				27	1	
Stuttgart II	2006–07	Regionalliga Süd	27	4	—				27	4	
Stuttgart II	Totals		75	9	—				75	9	—
1899 Hoffenheim II	2007–08	Oberliga Baden-Württemberg	2	0	—				2	0	
1899 Hoffenheim II	2011–12	Regionalliga Süd	2	0	—				2	0	
1899 Hoffenheim II	2012–13	Regionalliga Südwest	2	0	—				2	0	
1899 Hoffenheim II	Totals		6	0	—				6	0	—
1899 Hoffenheim	2007–08	2. Bundesliga	15	1	1	0	—		16	1	
1899 Hoffenheim	2008–09	Bundesliga	31	0	2	0	—		33	0	
1899 Hoffenheim	2009–10	Bundesliga	15	0	0	0	—		15	0	
1899 Hoffenheim	2010–11	Bundesliga	17	0	3	0	—		20	0	
1899 Hoffenheim	2011–12	Bundesliga	13	0	1	0	—		14	0	
1899 Hoffenheim	2012–13	Bundesliga	18	2	1	0	1	0	20	2	
1899 Hoffenheim	Totals		109	3	8	0	1	0	118	3	—
Eintracht Frankfurt	2013–14	Bundesliga	4	0	1	0	—		5	0	
Bochum II	2014–15	Regionalliga West	1	0	—		—		1	0	
Bochum	2014–15	2. Bundesliga	11	2	1	0	—		12	2	
Bochum	2015–16	2. Bundesliga	4	0	2	0	—		6	0	
Bochum	Totals		15	2	3	0	—		18	2	—
Career totals			210	14	11	0	1	0	222	14	—
