= Sven Schipplock =

German footballer (born 1988)

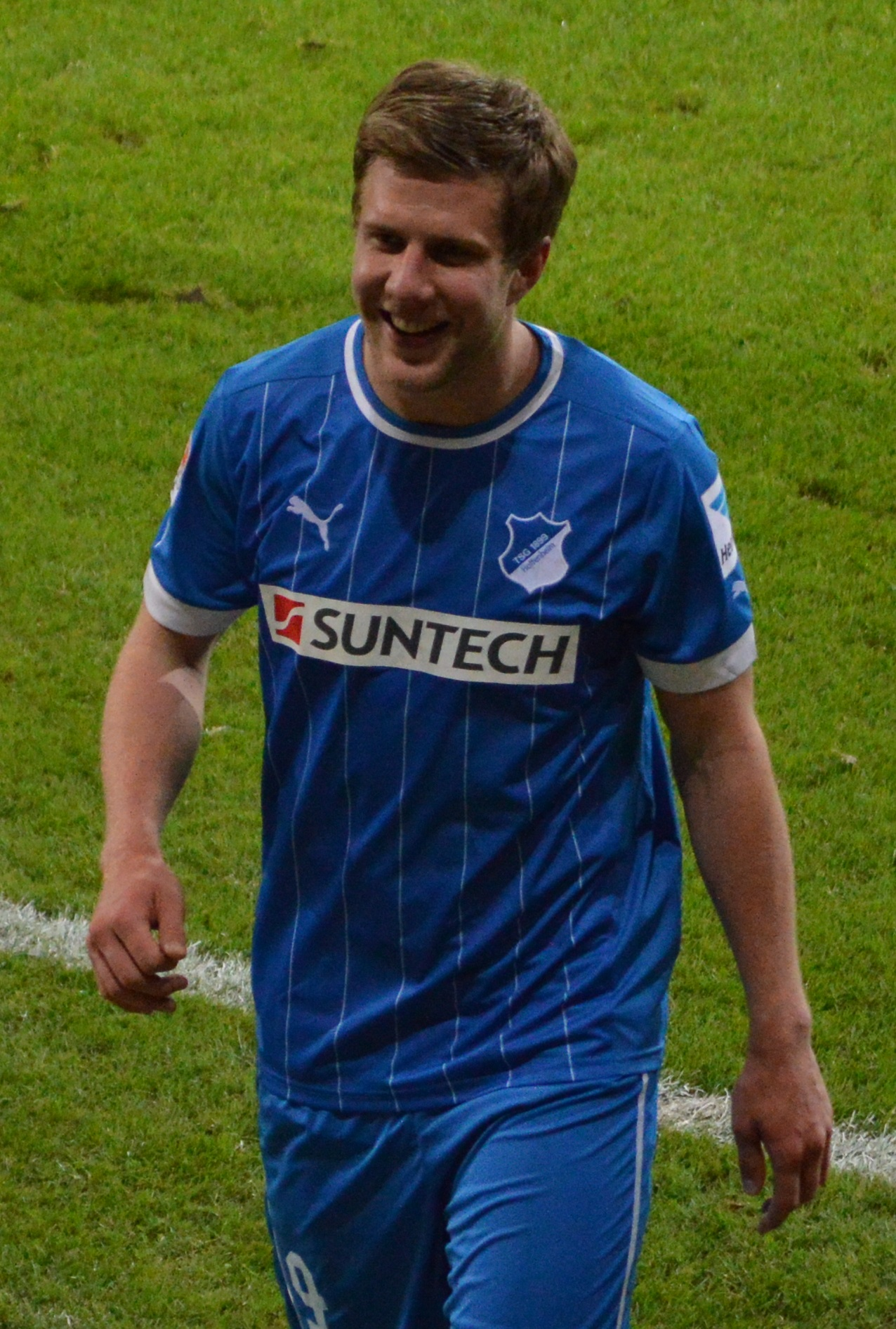
- Schipplock playing for 1899 Hoffenheim in 2013

Personal information
- Date of birth: 8 November 1988 (age 37)
- Place of birth: Reutlingen, West Germany
- Height: 1.85 m (6 ft 1 in)
- Position: Centre-forward

Team information
- Current team: VfB Stuttgart II
- Number: 22

Youth career
- FC Engstingen
- SSV Reutlingen
- –2005: TSV Sondelfingen
- 2005–2006: VfL Pfullingen
- 2006–2007: SSV Reutlingen

Senior career*
Years	Team	Apps	(Gls)
2007–2008	SSV Reutlingen	19	(8)
2008–2011	VfB Stuttgart II	89	(31)
2010–2011	VfB Stuttgart	12	(1)
2011–2015	1899 Hoffenheim	84	(16)
2015–2018	Hamburger SV	30	(0)
2016–2017	→ Darmstadt 98 (loan)	23	(2)
2018–2021	Arminia Bielefeld	44	(2)
2021–	VfB Stuttgart II	0	(0)
- * Club domestic league appearances and goals as of 7 August 2021.

Sven Schipplock (born 8 November 1988) is a German professional footballer who plays as a centre-forward for fourth tier side VfB Stuttgart II.

== Career ==
After making a name for himself in the Regionalliga Süd with SSV Reutlingen he moved to VfB Stuttgart in 2008 where he initially played for the second team in the newly formed third division 3. Liga. He made his Bundesliga debut for the first team on 30 October 2010 in an away game against VfL Wolfsburg, where he came on as a substitute in the 80th minute.

On 22 January 2011, he debuted in the starting line-up against Borussia Dortmund at Signal Iduna Park.

His first Bundesliga goal came on 12 March 2011 in the crucial away game to FC St. Pauli where he scored the 88th-minute winner in a 2–1 victory that lifted his club out of the Bundesliga relegation zone. He had only been on the field for six minutes when he struck his goal, a well-taken shot from outside the box into the bottom corner.

On 9 May 2011, Bundesliga club TSG 1899 Hoffenheim announced it has signed Schipplock on a three-year contract.

On 17 August 2014, Schipplock scored five goals in round 1 of DFB-Pokal where 1899 Hoffenheim beat 9–0 USC Paloma to pass the round.

On 24 July 2015, it was announced that Schipplock had signed for Hamburger SV on a three-year contract for around £1.75 million.

On 17 August 2016, Schipplock joined Darmstadt 98 on a season-long loan.

In 2018, Schipplock signed for Arminia Bielefeld on a three-year deal.
