= Romain Brégerie =

French footballer (born 1986)

Personal information
- Full name: Romain Brégerie
- Date of birth: 9 August 1986 (age 40)
- Place of birth: Talence, France
- Height: 1.89 m (6 ft 2 in)
- Position: Centre-back

Youth career
- 2001–2002: Langon-Castets
- 2002–2006: Bordeaux

Senior career*
Years	Team	Apps	(Gls)
2006–2008	Bordeaux	0	(0)
2007–2008	→ FC Sète (loan)	24	(2)
2008–2011	Metz	69	(2)
2010	→ Châteauroux (loan)	17	(1)
2011–2014	Dynamo Dresden	94	(4)
2014–2015	Darmstadt 98	33	(6)
2015–2019	FC Ingolstadt 04	44	(3)
2018	→ Darmstadt 98 (loan)	14	(0)
2018	→ 1. FC Magdeburg (loan)	5	(0)
- * Club domestic league appearances and goals as of 23:53, 13 July 2019 (UTC)

Romain Brégerie (born 9 August 1986) is a French former footballer who played as a centre-back.

== Career ==
After moving from FC Girondins de Bordeaux in summer 2008 to FC Metz, the defender was loaned to LB Châteauroux in January 2010. In June 2011 he signed a two-year contract with Dynamo Dresden. On 4 July 2014, he signed a one-year contract with SV Darmstadt 98. In January 2018, he returned to Darmstadt, joining on loan from Ingolstadt 04 for the second half of the season.
