= Henrik Gulden =

Norwegian footballer (born 1995)

Personal information
- Date of birth: 29 December 1995 (age 30)
- Place of birth: Drammen, Norway
- Height: 1.78 m (5 ft 10 in)
- Position: Midfielder

Youth career
- –2005: Sportfreunde Niederwenigern
- 2005–2006: Schwarz-Weiß Essen
- 2006–2014: VfL Bochum

Senior career*
Years	Team	Apps	(Gls)
2013–2015	VfL Bochum II	16	(0)
2013–2016	VfL Bochum	3	(0)
2015	→ Mjøndalen (loan)	4	(0)
2016	Rot-Weiss Essen	0	(0)
2016	Sportfreunde Niederwenigern	0	(0)
2017–2019	Mjøndalen	15	(1)

International career
2012	Norway U-17	5	(0)
2013	Norway U-18	4	(0)
- * Club domestic league appearances and goals as of 29 August 2018

Henrik Gulden (born 29 December 1995) is a Norwegian footballer who plays as a midfielder for Mjøndalen. He is the oldest son of former professional footballer and current Adidas CEO Bjørn Gulden.

With Rot-Weiss Essen Gulden won the Lower Rhine Cup in 2016. In summer 2016 he was transferred back to his youth club Sportfreunde Niederwenigern in the town of Hattingen.

== Career ==
=== Statistics ===
As of 29 August 2018

Club performance			League		Cup		Total	
Season	Club	League	Apps	Goals	Apps	Goals	Apps	Goals
Germany			League		DFB-Pokal		Total	
2013–14	VfL Bochum II	Regionalliga West	0	0	—		0	0
2014–15	VfL Bochum II	Regionalliga West	16	0	—		16	0
2013–14	VfL Bochum	2. Bundesliga	2	0	0	0	2	0
2014–15	VfL Bochum	2. Bundesliga	1	0	1	0	2	0
Norway			League		Norwegian Cup		Total	
2015	Mjøndalen IF	Tippeligaen	4	0	0	0	4	0
Germany			League		DFB-Pokal		Total	
2015–16	VfL Bochum	2. Bundesliga	0	0	0	0	0	0
2015–16	Rot-Weiss Essen	Regionalliga West	0	0	—		0	0
Norway			League		Norwegian Cup		Total	
2017	Mjøndalen	OBOS-ligaen	9	0	2	0	11	0
2018	Mjøndalen	OBOS-ligaen	6	1	2	0	8	1
Total	Germany		19	0	1	0	20	0
Total	Norway		19	1	4	0	23	1
Career total			38	1	5	0	43	1
