= Laurynas Kulikas =

Footballer (born 1994)

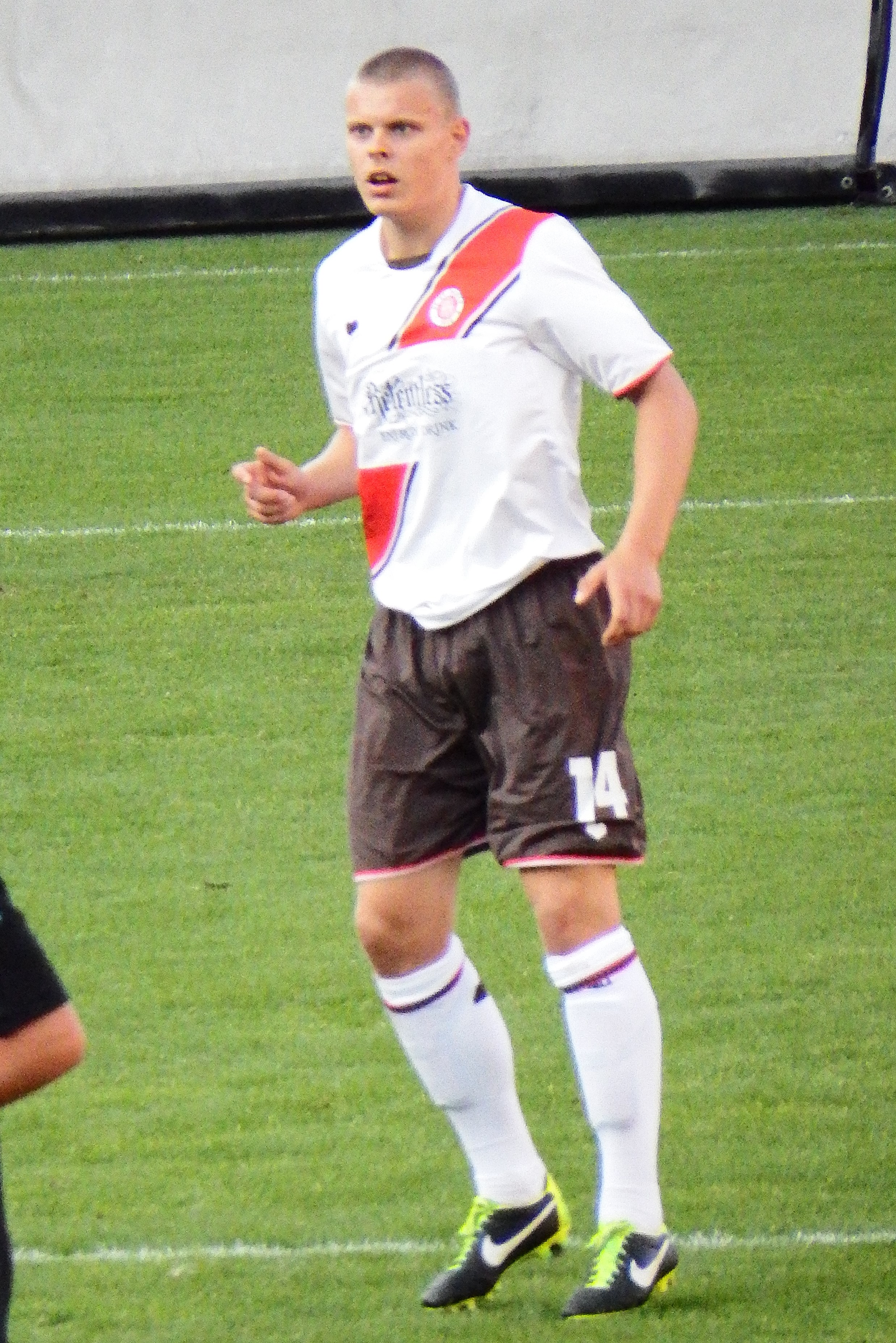
- Kulikas in 2013

Personal information
- Date of birth: 13 April 1994 (age 32)
- Place of birth: Kiel, Germany
- Height: 1.87 m (6 ft 2 in)
- Position: Forward

Team information
- Current team: Holstein Kiel II
- Number: 19

Youth career
- –2009: FC Kilia Kiel
- 2009–2011: Holstein Kiel
- 2011–2013: FC St. Pauli

Senior career*
Years	Team	Apps	(Gls)
2012–2014	FC St. Pauli II	28	(17)
2013–2014	FC St. Pauli	1	(0)
2014–2015	VfL Bochum II	18	(4)
2014–2015	VfL Bochum	0	(0)
2015–2016	Hamburger SV II	18	(0)
2016	Eintracht Norderstedt	12	(0)
2017	TSV Steinbach	8	(0)
2017	VfR Neumünster	13	(7)
2018–	Holstein Kiel II	180	(68)
- * Club domestic league appearances and goals as of 30 June 2026

Laurynas Kulikas (born 13 April 1994) is a footballer who plays as a forward for Holstein Kiel II.

== Career statistics ==
As of matches played on 1 July 2024

Appearances and goals by club, season and competition
Club	Season	League			Other			Total
Club	Season	Division	Apps	Goals	Apps	Goals	Apps	Goals
FC St. Pauli	2012–13	2. Bundesliga	1	0	0	0	1	0
FC St. Pauli II	2012–13	Regionalliga Nord	9	7	–		9	7
FC St. Pauli II	2013–14	Regionalliga Nord	19	10	–		19	10
FC St. Pauli II	Total		28	17	0	0	28	17
VfL Bochum II	2014–15	Regionalliga West	18	4	–		18	4
Hamburger SV II	2015–16	Regionalliga Nord	18	0	–		18	0
Eintracht Norderstedt	2016–17	Regionalliga Nord	12	0	–		12	0
TSV Steinbach	2016–17	Regionalliga Südwest	8	0	–		8	0
VfR Neumünster	2017–18	Schleswig-Holstein-Liga	13	7	–		13	7
Holstein Kiel II	2017–18	Schleswig-Holstein-Liga	11	9	3 (Note: Appearances in Regionalliga play-offs)	3	14	12
Holstein Kiel II	2018–19	Regionalliga Nord	27	15	–		27	15
Holstein Kiel II	2019–20	Regionalliga Nord	22	13	–		22	13
Holstein Kiel II	2020–21	Regionalliga Nord	9	2	–		9	2
Holstein Kiel II	2021–22	Regionalliga Nord	21	7	–		21	7
Holstein Kiel II	2022–23	Regionalliga Nord	18	7	–		18	7
Holstein Kiel II	2023–24	Regionalliga Nord	29	7	–		29	7
Holstein Kiel II	2024–25	Regionalliga Nord	0	0	–		0	0
Holstein Kiel II	Total		137	60	3	3	140	63
Career total			235	88	3	3	238	91
