= Nicolas Abdat =

German footballer (born 1996)

Personal information
- Date of birth: 29 November 1996 (age 29)
- Place of birth: Wipperfürth, Germany
- Height: 1.72 m (5 ft 8 in)
- Position: Left-back

Team information
- Current team: VfL Bochum II
- Number: 15

Youth career
- 1999–2008: DJK Wipperfeld
- 2008–2010: 1. FC Köln
- 2010–2013: Wattenscheid 09
- 2013–2015: VfL Bochum

Senior career*
Years	Team	Apps	(Gls)
2014–2015	VfL Bochum II	2	(0)
2014–2015	VfL Bochum	6	(0)
2015–2018	VfL Wolfsburg II	51	(2)
2018–2019	Wattenscheid 09	19	(0)
2019–2021	Go Ahead Eagles	16	(0)
2021–2023	TOP Oss	16	(0)
2024–	VfL Bochum II	49	(3)
- * Club domestic league appearances and goals as of 23 September 2026

Nicolas Abdat (born 29 November 1996) is a German professional footballer who plays as a left-back for VfL Bochum II.

== Career statistics ==
As of match played 9 September 2022

Appearances and goals by club, season and competition
Club	Season	League			Cup		Total	
Club	Season	Division	Apps	Goals	Apps	Goals	Apps	Goals
VfL Bochum II	2014–15	Regionalliga West	2	0	—		2	0
VfL Bochum	2014–15	2. Bundesliga	6	0	0	0	6	0
VfL Wolfsburg II	2015–16	Regionalliga Nord	5	1	—		5	1
VfL Wolfsburg II	2016–17	Regionalliga Nord	22	0	—		22	0
VfL Wolfsburg II	2017–18	Regionalliga Nord	24	1	—		24	1
VfL Wolfsburg II	Total		51	2	0	0	51	2
Wattenscheid 09	2018–19	Regionalliga West	20	0	0	0	20	0
Go Ahead Eagles	2019–20	Eerste Divisie	8	0	0	0	8	0
Go Ahead Eagles	2020–21	Eerste Divisie	8	0	1	0	9	0
Go Ahead Eagles	Total		16	0	1	0	17	0
TOP Oss	2021–22	Eerste Divisie	11	0	0	0	11	0
TOP Oss	2022–23	Eerste Divisie	5	0	0	0	5	0
TOP Oss	Total		16	0	0	0	16	0
Career total			111	2	1	0	112	2
