= Adnan Zahirović =

Bosnian footballer (born 1990)

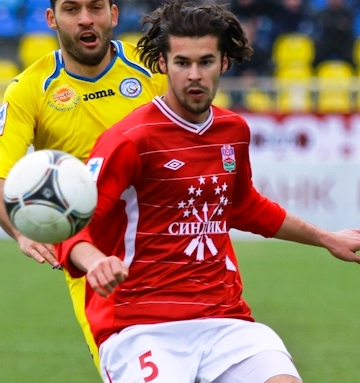
- Zahirović playing for Spartak Nalchik in 2012

Personal information
- Date of birth: 23 March 1990 (age 36)
- Place of birth: Banja Luka, SFR Yugoslavia
- Height: 1.78 m (5 ft 10 in)
- Position: Defensive midfielder

Team information
- Current team: SV Neresheim

Youth career
- 2007–2009: Čelik Zenica

Senior career*
Years	Team	Apps	(Gls)
2008–2011	Čelik Zenica	40	(0)
2011–2013	Spartak Nalchik	46	(4)
2013	→ Dinamo Minsk (loan)	7	(0)
2013–2015	VfL Bochum	22	(1)
2014	→ VfL Bochum II	1	(0)
2015–2016	Hapoel Acre	20	(0)
2016	Željezničar	12	(0)
2016	RNK Split	2	(0)
2017–2018	Mladost Doboj Kakanj	15	(1)
2019	Excelsior Virton	9	(0)
2019–2020	SV Neresheim		
2020–2023	AC Milan Heidenheim		
2023–	SV Neresheim		

International career
2010–2012	Bosnia and Herzegovina U21	5	(1)
2010–2013	Bosnia and Herzegovina	20	(0)
- * Club domestic league appearances and goals

Adnan Zahirović (born 23 March 1990) is a Bosnian professional footballer who plays as a defensive midfielder for SV Neresheim.

== Club career ==
Zahirović started his career at Čelik Zenica in Bosnia and Herzegovina, where he played for two seasons.

In 2011, he was transferred to Russian side Spartak Nalchik.

He was then loaned to Dinamo Minsk.

He moved to German club VfL Bochum in July 2013.

On 17 July 2015 he signed for Hapoel Acre.

In February 2016, after terminating his contract with Hapoel, he signed a two-year deal with Bosnian side Željezničar. However, that summer he rescinded his contract with the Sarajevo-based club, signing for RNK Split. Zahirović would go on to feature in only two games for the Croatian club, parting ways with it in December 2016.

He signed for FK Mladost Doboj Kakanj in June 2017. On 28 June 2018, Zahirović left Mladost after one year, 15 league games and 1 league goal.

On 17 October 2019, Zahirović joined German amateur club SV Neresheim. In summer 2020 he moved on to AC Milan Heidenheim.

== International career ==
Zahirović was a member of Bosnia and Herzegovina under-21 squad, making five appearances.

He made his international debut in 2010, in a friendly game against Poland. and has earned a total of 20 caps, scoring no goals. His final international was an October 2013 World Cup qualification match against Lithuania.

== Career statistics ==
=== Club ===
As of match played 19 May 2018

Appearances and goals by club, season and competition
Club	Season	League	League		Cup		Continental		Total	
Club	Season	League	Apps	Goals	Apps	Goals	Apps	Goals	Apps	Goals
Čelik Zenica	2009–10	Bosnian Premier League	14	0	—		—		14	0
Čelik Zenica	2010–11	Bosnian Premier League	13	0	—		—		13	0
Čelik Zenica	Total		27	0	0	0	0	0	27	0
Spartak Nalchik	2011–12	Russian Premier League	32	4	—		—		32	4
Spartak Nalchik	2012–13	Russian Premier League	14	0	—		—		14	0
Spartak Nalchik	Total		46	4	0	0	0	0	46	4
Dinamo Minsk (loan)	2013	Belarusian Premier League	7	0	1	0	0	0	8	0
VfL Bochum	2013–14	2. Bundesliga	13	1	1	0	—		14	1
VfL Bochum	2014–15	2. Bundesliga	9	0	1	0	—		10	0
VfL Bochum	Total		22	1	2	0	0	0	24	1
VfL Bochum II	2014–15	Regionalliga	1	0	—		—		1	0
Hapoel Acre	2015–16	Israeli Premier League	17	0	3	0	—		20	0
Željezničar Sarajevo	2015–16	Bosnian Premier League]	12	0	3	0	—		15	0
Split	2016–17	Prva HNL	2	0	1	0	—		3	0
Mladost Doboj Kakanj	2017–18	Bosnian Premier League]	15	1	0	0	—		15	1
Career total			149	6	10	0	0	0	159	6

=== International ===
Appearances and goals by national team and year
National team	Year	Apps	Goals
Bosnia and Herzegovina	2010	1	0
Bosnia and Herzegovina	2011	7	0
Bosnia and Herzegovina	2012	7	0
Bosnia and Herzegovina	2013	5	0
Bosnia and Herzegovina	2014	0	0
Bosnia and Herzegovina	2015	0	0
Total		20	0
