= 2009–10 TSG 1899 Hoffenheim season =

TSG 1899 Hoffenheim
2009–10 season
- Manager: Ralf Rangnick
- Stadium: Rhein-Neckar-Arena
- Bundesliga: 11th
- DFB-Pokal: Quarter finals
- Top goalscorer: League: Vedad Ibišević (12); All: Vedad Ibišević (13)
Home colours	Away colours

The 2009–10 Bundesliga season was the 111th in Hoffenheim's history and second consecutive season in the Bundesliga. They finished in eleventh, accumulating a total of 42 points over 34 games.

== First-team squad ==
Squad at end of season

Note: Flags indicate national team as defined under FIFA eligibility rules; some limited exceptions apply. Players may hold more than one non-FIFA nationality.

No.	Pos.	Nation	Player
1	GK	GER	Daniel Haas
2	DF	GER	Andreas Beck
3	DF	GER	Matthias Jaissle
5	DF	GER	Marvin Compper
7	FW	BRA	Maicosuel
8	DF	GER	Christian Eichner
9	FW	SEN	Demba Ba
10	MF	BRA	Carlos Eduardo Marques
11	FW	GER	Marco Terrazzino
12	FW	BRA	Wellington
14	DF	CRO	Josip Šimunić
17	MF	GER	Tobias Weis
18	FW	GHA	Prince Tagoe
19	FW	BIH	Vedad Ibišević (Captain)
20	FW	NGR	Chinedu Obasi
21	MF	BRA	Luiz Gustavo
22	DF	FIN	Jukka Raitala

No.	Pos.	Nation	Player
23	MF	BIH	Sejad Salihović
24	DF	SWE	Per Nilsson
25	DF	GHA	Isaac Vorsah
26	DF	AUT	Andreas Ibertsberger
27	GK	AUT	Ramazan Özcan
28	GK	GER	Timo Hildebrand
29	MF	GER	Adam Jabiri
30	GK	GER	Jens Grahl
32	DF	GER	Robin Neupert
34	MF	GER	Boris Vukčević
35	DF	GER	Kevin Conrad
36	MF	ITA	Franco Zuculini
37	DF	GER	Manuel Gulde
38	FW	GER	Kai Herdling
39	MF	GER	Pascal Groß

== Transfers ==
=== Summer ===
==== In ====
Note: Flags indicate national team as defined under FIFA eligibility rules; some limited exceptions apply. Players may hold more than one non-FIFA nationality.

No.	Pos.	Nation	Player
7	FW	BRA	Maicosuel (from Desportivo Brasil)
8	DF	GER	Christian Eichner (from Karlsruher SC)
14	DF	CRO	Josip Šimunić (from Hertha BSC)
18	FW	GHA	Prince Tagoe (from Al-Ettifaq)
22	DF	FIN	Jukka Raitala (One-year loan from HJK Helsinki)
30	GK	GER	Jens Grahl (from Greuther Furth)
36	MF	ITA	Franco Zuculini (from Racing Club de Avellaneda)

==== Out ====
Note: Flags indicate national team as defined under FIFA eligibility rules; some limited exceptions apply. Players may hold more than one non-FIFA nationality.

No.	Pos.	Nation	Player
—	DF	GER	Christoph Janker (to Hertha BSC)
—	DF	GER	Jonas Strifler (to Dynamo Dresden)
—	MF	GER	Selim Teber (to Eintracht Frankfurt)
—	MF	GER	Steffen Haas (loaned to Kickers Offenbach)
—	FW	BRA	Wellington Luís de Sousa (loaned to FC Twente)
—	FW	GER	Kai Herdling (demoted to TSG 1899 Hoffenheim II)
—	FW	CIV	Boubacar Sanogo (end of loan from Werder Bremen)

=== Winter ===
==== Out ====
Note: Flags indicate national team as defined under FIFA eligibility rules; some limited exceptions apply. Players may hold more than one non-FIFA nationality.

No.	Pos.	Nation	Player
—	GK	AUT	Ramazan Özcan (loaned to Beşiktaş)

== Competitions ==
=== Overview ===
Competition	First match	Last match	Starting round	Final position	Record							
Competition	First match	Last match	Starting round	Final position	Pld	W	D	L	GF	GA	GD	Win %
Bundesliga	8 August 2009	8 May 2010	Matchday 1	11th	34	11	9	14	44	42	+2	32.35
DFB-Pokal	2 August 2009	9 February 2010	First round	Quarter-finals	4	3	0	1	8	2	+6	75.00
Total					38	14	9	15	52	44	+8	36.84

Last updated: 24 August 2021
Source: DFB

=== Bundesliga ===
==== League table ====
Pos	Team	Pld	W	D	L	GF	GA	GD	Pts
9	Mainz 05	34	12	11	11	36	42	−6	47
10	Eintracht Frankfurt	34	12	10	12	47	54	−7	46
11	1899 Hoffenheim	34	11	9	14	44	42	+2	42
12	Borussia Mönchengladbach	34	10	9	15	43	60	−17	39
13	1. FC Köln	34	9	11	14	33	42	−9	38

Source: kicker.de (in German)
Rules for classification: 1) points; 2) goal difference; 3) number of goals scored.

==== Results summary ====
Overall								Home						Away					
Pld	W	D	L	GF	GA	GD	Pts	W	D	L	GF	GA	GD	W	D	L	GF	GA	GD
34	11	9	14	44	42	+2	42	5	6	6	26	20	+6	6	3	8	18	22	−4

Last updated: 24 August 2021.
Source: DFB

==== Results by round ====
Round	1	2	3	4	5	6	7	8	9	10	11	12	13	14	15	16	17	18	19	20	21	22	23	24	25	26	27	28	29	30	31	32	33	34
Ground	H	A	H	A	H	A	H	A	A	H	A	H	A	H	A	H	A	A	H	A	H	A	H	A	H	H	A	H	A	H	A	H	A	H
Result	D	L	D	W	W	W	W	L	L	W	W	L	W	L	D	D	L	L	L	L	W	L	D	W	L	L	D	D	L	L	D	W	W	D
Position	12	14	15	10	7	4	3	5	7	6	5	7	4	6	6	7	7	8	9	9	9	9	10	9	11	11	11	11	11	12	13	11	11	11

Updated to match(es) played on 8 May 2010. Source: DFB
A = Away; H = Home; W = Win; D = Draw; L = Loss

==== Matches ====
8 August 2009 1	1899 Hoffenheim	1–1	Bayern Munich	Sinsheim
18:30 CEST (UTC+2)	Obasi 41'	Report	Olić 25'; van Bommel (yellow card) 76'	Stadium: Rhein-Neckar-Arena; Attendance: 30150; Referee: Babak Rafati

15 August 2009 2	Bayer Leverkusen	1–0	1899 Hoffenheim	Leverkusen
15:30 CEST (UTC+2)	Kadlec (yellow card) 60'; Kießling 67'; Vidal (yellow card) 76'; Adler (yellow card) 90'	Report	Vorsah (yellow card) 31'; Ibišević (yellow card) 34'	Stadium: BayArena; Attendance: 28000; Referee: Peter Gagelmann

21 August 2009 3	1899 Hoffenheim	0–0	FC Schalke 04	Sinsheim
20:30 CEST (UTC+2)	Vorsah (yellow card) 28'; Salihović (yellow card) 36'; Obasi (yellow card) 82'; Eichner (yellow card) 84'	Report	Pliatsikas (yellow card) 17'; Zambrano (yellow card) 30'; Höwedes (yellow card) 64'; Bordon (yellow card) 78'	Stadium: Rhein-Neckar-Arena; Attendance: 30150; Referee: Michael Weiner

29 August 2009 4	Hannover 96	0–1	1899 Hoffenheim	Hannover
15:30 CEST (UTC+2)		Report	Eduardo 40'; Ibišević 58'	Stadium: AWD-Arena; Attendance: 34257; Referee: Lutz Wagner

12 September 2009 5	1899 Hoffenheim	3–0	VfL Bochum	Sinsheim
15:30 CEST (UTC+2)	Ba 16'; Obasi 58'; Compper 79'	Report	Dabrowski (yellow card) 20'; Bonig (yellow card) 58'; Aydin (yellow card) 78'; Concha (yellow card) 79'	Stadium: Rhein-Neckar-Arena; Attendance: 29500; Referee: Felix Zwayer

19 September 2009 6	Borussia Mönchengladbach	2–4	1899 Hoffenheim	Mönchengladbach
15:30 CEST (UTC+2)	Arango 10' , (yellow card) 74'; Colautti 17'; Levels (yellow card) 63'; Jaurès (yellow card) 90'	Report	Salihović 21' , (yellow card) 21'; Maicosuel 86'; Obasi 89'; Ba 90'	Stadium: Borussia-Park; Attendance: 46511; Referee: Wolfgang Stark

27 September 2009 7	1899 Hoffenheim	5–1	Hertha BSC	Sinsheim
17:30 CEST (UTC+2)	Ibišević 1', 4', 21'; Beck (yellow card) 45'; Compper (yellow card) 52'; Obasi 58'; Eduardo 62'	Report	Raffael 45'; Pejčinović (yellow card) 90'	Stadium: Rhein-Neckar-Arena; Attendance: 29600; Referee: Peter Sippel

3 October 2009 8	Mainz 05	2–1	1899 Hoffenheim	Mainz
15:30 CEST (UTC+2)	Peković (yellow card) 2'; Ivanschitz 6' , (yellow card) 67'; Bancé 11'; Heller (yellow card) 14'; Lőw (yellow card) 45'; Gopko (yellow card) 59'; Müller (yellow card) 73'	Report	Ba (yellow card) 48'; Ibertsberger 87'	Stadium: Bruchwegstadion; Attendance: 20300; Referee: Guido Winkmann

17 October 2009 9	Werder Bremen	2–0	1899 Hoffenheim	Bremen
15:30 CEST (UTC+2)	Wiese (yellow card) 14'; Pizarro 18' , (yellow card) 61'; Mertesacker 22'; Bargfrede (yellow card) 71'	Report	Salihović (yellow card) 15'; Compper (yellow card) 23'; Šimunić (yellow card) 40'; Vorsah (yellow card) 52'; Gustavo (yellow card) 56'; Obasi (yellow card) 66'; Vukčević (yellow card) 84'	Stadium: Weserstadion; Attendance: 33916; Referee: Knut Kircher

24 October 2009 10	1899 Hoffenheim	3–0	FC Nürnberg	Sinsheim
15:30 CEST (UTC+2)	Ibertsberger (yellow card) 29'; Eichner 34'; Ibišević 38'; Zuculini 64'	Report	Gygax (yellow card) 33'; Judt (yellow card) 57'	Stadium: Rhein-Neckar-Arena; Attendance: 30150; Referee: Michael Weiner

1 November 2009 11	SC Freiburg	0–1	1899 Hoffenheim	Freiburg
15:30 CEST (UTC+2)		Report	Maicosuel 39'	Stadium: Badenova-Stadion; Attendance: 24000; Referee: Florian Meyer

7 November 2009 12	1899 Hoffenheim	1–2	VfL Wolfsburg	Sinsheim
15:30 CEST (UTC+2)	Ibišević 23' , (yellow card) 53'; Šimunić (yellow card) 72'; Hildebrand (yellow card) 90'	Report	Misimović (yellow card) 41' , (goal) 52'; Grafite 57'; Hasebe (yellow card) 73'; Josué (yellow card) 80'	Stadium: Rhein-Neckar-Arena; Attendance: 29400; Referee: Thorsten Kinhöfer

21 November 2009 13	1. FC Köln	0–4	1899 Hoffenheim	Köln
15:30 CEST (UTC+2)	Maniche (yellow card) 28'; Podolski (yellow card) 34'; Petit (yellow card) 63'	Report	Eduardo 5'; Obasi 11'; Ba 46'; Ibišević 90' (pen.)	Stadium: RheinEnergieStadion; Attendance: 45000; Referee: Felix Brych

28 November 2009 14	1899 Hoffenheim	1–2	Borussia Dortmund	Sinsheim
15:30 CEST (UTC+2)	Compper (yellow card) 40'; Ba 49'; Šimunić (yellow card) 79'; Maicosuel (red card) 81'; Salihović (yellow card) 89'	Report	Błaszczykowski 2'; Subotić (yellow card) 30'; Schmelzer (yellow card) 54'; Şahin 79' (pen.); Bender (yellow card) 83'	Stadium: Rhein-Neckar-Arena; Attendance: 30150; Referee: Michael Kempter

5 December 2009 15	Hamburger SV	0–0	1899 Hoffenheim	Hamburg
15:30 CEST (UTC+2)	Demel (yellow card) 56'; Petrić (yellow card) 82'; Rincón (yellow card) 88'	Report	Eichner (yellow card) 75'	Stadium: HSH Nordbank Arena; Attendance: 52725; Referee: Wolfgang Stark

12 December 2009 16	1899 Hoffenheim	1–1	Eintracht Frankfurt	Sinsheim
15:30 CEST (UTC+2)	Salihović 9' (pen.) , (yellow card) 73'; Ibertsberger (yellow card) 81'; Eichner (yellow card) 90'	Report	Schwegler 61'	Stadium: Rhein-Neckar-Arena; Attendance: 30150; Referee: Günter Perl

19 December 2009 17	VfB Stuttgart	3–1	1899 Hoffenheim	Stuttgart
18:30 CEST (UTC+2)	Marica 32' (pen.) , (yellow card) 60'; Delpierre (yellow card) 43'; Gebhart (yellow card) 65'; Cacau 68'; Khedira 82'	Report	Maicosuel 44'; Luiz Gustavo (yellow card) 52' (yellow-red card); Chinedu Obasi (yellow card) 87'	Stadium: Mercedes-Benz-Arena; Attendance: 41000; Referee: Manuel Gräfe

15 January 2010 18	Bayern Munich	2–0	1899 Hoffenheim	Munich
20:30 CEST (UTC+2)	Demichelis 35'; Klose 86'	Report	Vukčević (yellow card) 42'; Salihović (yellow card) 60'; Šimunić (yellow card) 81'	Stadium: Allianz Arena; Attendance: 69000; Referee: Thorsten Kinhöfer

24 January 2010 19	1899 Hoffenheim	0–3	Bayer Leverkusen	Sinsheim
17:30 CEST (UTC+2)	Salihović (yellow card) 55'; Šimunić (yellow card) 62'	Report	Hyypiä 11'; Schwaab (yellow card) 33'; Vidal (yellow card) 39'; Kroos 51'; Barnetta 72'; Friedrich (yellow card) 80'	Stadium: Rhein-Neckar-Arena; Attendance: 29500; Referee: Deniz Aytekin

30 January 2010 20	FC Schalke 04	2–0	1899 Hoffenheim	Gelsenkirchen
18:30 CEST (UTC+2)	Kurányi 19'; Rakitić (yellow card) 43'; Schmitz 49'; Matip (yellow card) 79'	Report	Eichner (yellow card) 7'; Salihović (yellow card) 37'; Andreas Beck (yellow card) 40'; Nilsson (yellow card) 86'	Stadium: Veltins-Arena; Attendance: 60402; Referee: Florian Meyer

6 February 2010 21	1899 Hoffenheim	2–1	Hannover 96	Sinsheim
15:30 CEST (UTC+2)	Eduardo 35'; Salihović 40' (pen.), (yellow card) 64'	Report	Haggui (yellow card) 44'; Koné 57'; Andreasen (yellow card) 71'; Pinto (yellow card) 80'; Chahed (yellow card) 83'	Stadium: Rhein-Neckar-Arena; Attendance: 28100; Referee: Helmut Fleischer

13 February 2010 22	VfL Bochum	2–1	1899 Hoffenheim	Bochum
15:30 CEST (UTC+2)	Šesták 24'; Dabrowski (yellow card) 73'; Dedič 76'	Report	Salihović (yellow card) 41'; Ibišević 64'; Maicosuel (yellow card) 80'; Gustavo (red card) 86'	Stadium: rewirpowerSTADION; Attendance: 17104; Referee: Marco Fritz

19 February 2010 23	1899 Hoffenheim	2–2	Borussia Mönchengladbach	Sinsheim
20:30 CEST (UTC+2)	Nilsson (yellow card) 31'; Šimunić (yellow card) 64'; Ibišević 69', (yellow card) 74'; Eduardo 89' (pen.)	Report	Daems 31' (pen.); Colautti 51'; Meeuwis (yellow card) 90'	Stadium: Rhein-Neckar-Arena; Attendance: 30150; Referee: Wolfgang Stark

27 February 2010 24	Hertha BSC	0–2	1899 Hoffenheim	Berlin
15:30 CEST (UTC+2)	Raffael (yellow card) 54'; Cícero (yellow card) 55'	Report	Ba 35'; Šimunić (yellow card) 63'; Ibertsberger (yellow card) 82'; Ibišević 90'	Stadium: Olympiastadion; Attendance: 37391; Referee: Thorsten Kinhöfer

7 March 2010 25	1899 Hoffenheim	0–1	Mainz 05	Sinsheim
17:30 CEST (UTC+2)		Report	Šimák (yellow card) 31'; Bancé 69'	Stadium: Rhein-Neckar-Arena; Attendance: 30150; Referee: Florian Meyer

14 March 2010 26	1899 Hoffenheim	0–1	Werder Bremen	Sinsheim
15:30 CEST (UTC+2)	Šimunić (yellow card) 83'	Report	Pizarro 80'	Stadium: Rhein-Neckar-Arena; Attendance: 30150; Referee: Peter Sippel

20 March 2010 27	FC Nürnberg	0–0	1899 Hoffenheim	Nürnberg
15:30 CEST (UTC+2)	Maroh (yellow card) 81'	Report	Šimunić (yellow card) 69'; Ibertsberger (yellow card) 84'	Stadium: easyCredit-Stadion; Attendance: 40421; Referee: Thorsten Kinhöfer

14 March 2010 28	1899 Hoffenheim	1–1	SC Freiburg	Sinsheim
15:30 CEST (UTC+2)	Šimunić (yellow card) 48', (goal) 80'	Report	Makiadi (yellow card) 55'; Mujdža (yellow card) 60'; Idrissou 64'	Stadium: Rhein-Neckar-Arena; Attendance: 30150; Referee: Helmut Fleischer

4 April 2010 29	VfL Wolfsburg	4–0	1899 Hoffenheim	Wolfsburg
15:30 CEST (UTC+2)	Džeko 25', 76'; Barzagli 51'; Misimović 74'	Report	Beck (yellow card) 36'; Gustavo (yellow card) 50'	Stadium: Volkswagen Arena; Attendance: 28107; Referee: Knut Kircher

10 April 2010 30	1899 Hoffenheim	0–2	1. FC Köln	Sinsheim
15:30 CEST (UTC+2)	Salihović (yellow card) 18'	Report	Novakovič (yellow card) 26'; Matuszczyk 46', 82'; Maniche (yellow card) 48'	Stadium: Rhein-Neckar-Arena; Attendance: 26950; Referee: Günter Perl

18 April 2010 31	Borussia Dortmund	1–1	1899 Hoffenheim	Dortmund
15:30 CEST (UTC+2)	Weidenfeller (yellow card) 38'; Valdez 57'; Dédé (yellow card) 62'	Report	Gustavo (yellow card) 38'; Šimunić (yellow card) 39'; Ibertsberger (yellow card) 61'; Ibišević 89'	Stadium: Signal Iduna Park; Attendance: 80100; Referee: Wolfgang Stark

25 April 2010 32	1899 Hoffenheim	5–1	Hamburger SV	Sinsheim
15:30 CEST (UTC+2)	Ibišević 2', 11'; Šimunić (yellow card) 22'; Obasi 31', 72'; Salihović 76'	Report	Tesche 65'; Arslan (red card) 89'	Stadium: Rhein-Neckar-Arena; Attendance: 30150; Referee: Manuel Gräfe

1 May 2010 33	Eintracht Frankfurt	1–2	1899 Hoffenheim	Frankfurt
15:30 CEST (UTC+2)	Schwegler 20', (yellow card) 23'	Report	Compper (yellow card) 33'; Salihović (yellow card) 36'; Tagoe 80', 89'	Stadium: Commerzbank-Arena; Attendance: 50500; Referee: Deniz Aytekin

8 May 2010 34	1899 Hoffenheim	1–1	VfB Stuttgart	Sinsheim
15:30 CEST (UTC+2)	Salihović (yellow card) 5'; Šimunić (yellow card) 21'; Vukčević 44'	Report	Cacau 20', (yellow card) 81'; Molinaro (yellow card) 67'	Stadium: Rhein-Neckar-Arena; Attendance: 30150; Referee: Jochen Drees

=== DFB-Pokal ===
2 August 2009 First round	FC Oberneuland	0–2	1899 Hoffenheim	Bremen
14:30 UTC+2		Report (in German)	Obasi 47'; Maicosuel 53'	Stadium: Sportpark Vinnenweg; Attendance: 3,500; Referee: Tobias Christ (Kaiserslautern)

22 September 2009 Second round	1. FC Nürnberg	0–1	1899 Hoffenheim	Nuremberg
19:00 UTC+2		Report (in German)	Nilsson 35'	Stadium: easyCredit-Stadion; Attendance: 26,041; Referee: Manuel Gräfe (Berlin)

28 October 2009 Round of 16	1899 Hoffenheim	4–0	TuS Koblenz	Sinsheim
20:30 UTC+1	Salihović 50'; Ibisević 67'; Maicosuel 71'; Compper 90'	Report (in German)		Stadium: Rhein-Neckar-Arena; Attendance: 18,050; Referee: Günter Perl (Pullach)

9 February 2010 Quarter-finals	Werder Bremen	2–1	1899 Hoffenheim	Weserstadion, Bremen
20:30 UTC+1	Naldo 27'; Almeida 76'	Report (in German)	Tagoe 73'	Attendance: 25,000; Referee: Peter Sippel (Munich)

== Statistics ==
=== Appearances and goals ===
No.	Pos	Nat	Player	Total		Bundesliga		DFB-Pokal	
No.	Pos	Nat	Player	Apps	Goals	Apps	Goals	Apps	Goals
Goalkeepers
1	GK	(Germany) GER	Daniel Haas	6	0	6	0	0	0
27	GK	(Austria) AUT	Ramazan Özcan	0	0	0	0	0	0
28	GK	(Germany) GER	Timo Hildebrand	32	0	28	0	4	0
30	GK	(Germany) GER	Jens Grahl	0	0	0	0	0	0
Defenders
2	DF	(Germany) GER	Andreas Beck	26	0	25	0	1	0
3	DF	(Germany) GER	Matthias Jaissle	0	0	0	0	0	0
5	DF	(Germany) GER	Marvin Compper	35	2	32	1	3	1
8	DF	(Germany) GER	Christian Eichner	29	1	25	1	4	0
14	DF	(Croatia) CRO	Josip Šimunić	31	1	31	1	0	0
22	DF	(Finland) FIN	Jukka Raitala	2	0	2	0	0	0
24	DF	(Sweden) SWE	Per Nilsson	11	1	8	0	3	1
25	DF	(Ghana) GHA	Isaac Vorsah	19	0	16	0	3	0
26	DF	(Austria) AUT	Andreas Ibertsberger	26	1	23	1	3	0
32	DF	(Germany) GER	Robin Neupert	0	0	0	0	0	0
35	DF	(Germany) GER	Kevin Conrad	0	0	0	0	0	0
37	DF	(Germany) GER	Manuel Gulde	6	0	6	0	0	0
Midfielders
10	MF	(Brazil) BRA	Carlos Eduardo	37	5	33	5	4	0
11	MF	(Germany) GER	Marco Terrazzino	10	0	8	0	2	0
17	MF	(Germany) GER	Tobias Weis	15	0	15	0	0	0
21	MF	(Brazil) BRA	Luiz Gustavo	30	0	27	0	3	0
23	MF	(Bosnia and Herzegovina) BIH	Sejad Salihović	36	5	32	4	4	1
31	MF	(Germany) GER	Andreas Ludwig	1	0	1	0	0	0
36	MF	(Argentina) ARG	Franco Zuculini	8	1	7	1	1	0
39	MF	(Germany) GER	Pascal Groß	2	0	1	0	1	0
Forwards
7	FW	(Brazil) BRA	Maicosuel	31	5	27	3	4	2
9	FW	(Senegal) SEN	Demba Ba	18	5	17	5	1	0
12	FW	(Brazil) BRA	Wellington	2	0	1	0	1	0
18	FW	(Ghana) GHA	Prince Tagoe	13	3	12	2	1	1
19	FW	(Bosnia and Herzegovina) BIH	Vedad Ibišević	38	13	34	12	4	1
20	FW	(Nigeria) NGR	Chinedu Obasi	26	8	23	7	3	1
29	FW	(Germany) GER	Adam Jabiri	1	0	1	0	0	0
34	FW	(Germany) GER	Boris Vukčević	32	1	28	1	4	0
38	FW	(Germany) GER	Kai Herdling	1	0	1	0	0	0

Last updated: 27 November 2021
Source: DFB
