= 2008–09 TSG 1899 Hoffenheim season =

TSG 1899 Hoffenheim
2008–09 season
- Manager: Ralf Rangnick
- Stadium: Carl-Benz-Stadion (until 31 January); Rhein-Neckar-Arena (from 31 January)
- Bundesliga: 7th
- DFB-Pokal: Second round
- Top goalscorer: League: Vedad Ibišević (18); All: Vedad Ibišević (19)
Home colours	Away colours

During the 2008–09 German football season, TSG 1899 Hoffenheim competed in the Bundesliga.

== Season summary ==
In their first ever season in the Bundesliga, Hoffenheim finished seventh.

== First-team squad ==
Squad at end of season

Note: Flags indicate national team as defined under FIFA eligibility rules; some limited exceptions apply. Players may hold more than one non-FIFA nationality.

No.	Pos.	Nation	Player
1	GK	GER	Daniel Haas
2	DF	GER	Andreas Beck
3	DF	GER	Matthias Jaissle
4	DF	TUR	Aytaç Sulu (Note: Sulu was born in Heidelberg, West Germany (now Germany), but also qualifies to represent Turkey internationally through his parents, only holds a Turkish passport, and has declared for Turkey internationally.)
5	DF	GER	Marvin Compper
6	DF	BRA	Fabricio (on loan from Flamengo)
9	FW	SEN	Demba Ba (Note: Ba was born in Sèvres, France, but also qualifies to represent Senegal internationally through his parents and made his international debut for Senegal in June 2007.)
10	MF	GER	Selim Teber
12	FW	BRA	Wellington
14	DF	GER	Christoph Janker
17	MF	GER	Tobias Weis
18	FW	CIV	Boubacar Sanogo (on loan from Werder Bremen)
19	FW	BIH	Vedad Ibišević
20	FW	NGR	Chinedu Obasi
21	MF	BRA	Luiz Gustavo

No.	Pos.	Nation	Player
23	MF	BIH	Sejad Salihović
24	DF	SWE	Per Nilsson
25	DF	GHA	Isaac Vorsah
26	DF	AUT	Andreas Ibertsberger
27	GK	AUT	Ramazan Özcan
28	GK	GER	Timo Hildebrand
29	GK	GER	Daniel Bernhardt
32	FW	GER	Kai Herdling
33	MF	BRA	Carlos Eduardo
34	MF	GER	Boris Vukčević (Note: Vukčević was born in Osijek, Yugoslavia (now Croatia), but also qualifies to represent Germany internationally and has represented them at U-19, U-20 and U-21 level.)
36	FW	GER	Marco Terrazzino
37	MF	GER	Jonas Strifler
39	MF	GER	Pascal Groß
42	DF	GER	Kevin Conrad

=== Left club during season ===
Note: Flags indicate national team as defined under FIFA eligibility rules; some limited exceptions apply. Players may hold more than one non-FIFA nationality.

No.	Pos.	Nation	Player
7	DF	GER	Dragan Paljić (to Kaiserslautern)
11	DF	GER	Jochen Seitz (to Alemannia Aachen)
13	DF	HUN	Zsolt Lőw (to Mainz)

No.	Pos.	Nation	Player
18	FW	GER	Kai Hesse (to Kaiserslautern)
22	MF	GER	Francisco Copado (to SpVgg Unterhaching)
30	GK	GER	Thorsten Kirschbaum (to Vaduz)

== Competitions ==
=== Overview ===
Competition	First match	Last match	Starting round	Final position	Record							
Competition	First match	Last match	Starting round	Final position	Pld	W	D	L	GF	GA	GD	Win %
Bundesliga	16 August 2008	23 May 2009	Matchday 1	7th	34	15	10	9	63	49	+14	44.12
DFB-Pokal	10 August 2008	24 September 2008	First round	Second round	2	1	0	1	2	3	−1	50.00
Total					36	16	10	10	65	52	+13	44.44

Last updated: 1 March 2022
Source: DFB

=== Bundesliga ===
==== League table ====
Pos	Team	Pld	W	D	L	GF	GA	GD	Pts	Qualification or relegation
5	Hamburger SV	34	19	4	11	49	47	+2	61	Qualification to Europa League third qualifying round
6	Borussia Dortmund	34	15	14	5	60	37	+23	59	
7	1899 Hoffenheim	34	15	10	9	63	49	+14	55	
8	Schalke 04	34	14	8	12	47	35	+12	50	
9	Bayer Leverkusen	34	14	7	13	59	46	+13	49	

Source: kicker (in German)
Rules for classification: 1) points; 2) goal difference; 3) number of goals scored.

==== Results summary ====
Overall								Home						Away					
Pld	W	D	L	GF	GA	GD	Pts	W	D	L	GF	GA	GD	W	D	L	GF	GA	GD
34	15	10	9	63	49	+14	55	9	5	3	30	18	+12	6	5	6	33	31	+2

Last updated: 1 March 2022.
Source: DFB

==== Results by round ====
Round	1	2	3	4	5	6	7	8	9	10	11	12	13	14	15	16	17	18	19	20	21	22	23	24	25	26	27	28	29	30	31	32	33	34
Ground	A	H	A	H	H	A	H	A	H	A	H	A	H	A	H	A	H	H	A	H	A	A	H	A	H	A	H	A	H	A	H	A	H	A
Result	W	W	L	D	W	L	W	W	W	W	W	L	W	W	W	L	D	W	D	L	D	D	D	D	D	L	L	D	L	L	W	W	D	W
Position	1	1	6	6	2	6	2	2	1	1	1	2	2	1	1	1	1	1	1	2	2	3	2	5	5	6	6	8	8	9	8	7	7	7

Updated to match(es) played on 23 May 2009. Source: DFB
A = Away; H = Home; W = Win; D = Draw; L = Loss

==== Matches ====
16 August 2008 1	Energie Cottbus	0–3	1899 Hoffenheim	Cottbus
15:30 CEST (UTC+2)		Report	Ibišević 16', 76'; Ba 54'	Stadium: Stadion der Freundschaft; Attendance: 18,370; Referee: Guido Winkmann

23 August 2008 2	1899 Hoffenheim	1–0	Borussia Mönchengladbach	Mannheim
15:30 CEST (UTC+2)	Ibišević 31'	Report		Stadium: Carl-Benz-Stadion; Attendance: 26,300; Referee: Thorsten Kinhöfer

30 August 2008 3	Bayer Leverkusen	5–2	1899 Hoffenheim	Leverkusen
15:30 CEST (UTC+2)	Haggui 8' Friedrich 16' Kießling 36', 87' Barnetta 83'	Report	Ibišević 20'; Salihović 58' (pen.)	Stadium: BayArena; Attendance: 21,000; Referee: Felix Brych

13 September 2008 4	1899 Hoffenheim	0–0	VfB Stuttgart	Mannheim
15:30 CEST (UTC+2)		Report		Stadium: Carl-Benz-Stadion; Attendance: 26,300; Referee: Peter Sippel

21 September 2008 5	1899 Hoffenheim	4–1	Borussia Dortmund	Mannheim
17:00 CEST (UTC+2)	Ibišević 5', 47'; Salihović 25'; Eduardo 67'	Report	Santana 90'	Stadium: Carl-Benz-Stadion; Attendance: 26,300; Referee: Babak Rafati

27 September 2008 6	Werder Bremen	5–4	1899 Hoffenheim	Bremen
15:30 CEST (UTC+2)	Özil 8', 81'; Pizarro 16'; Diego 21'; Hunt 30'	Report	Ba 15'; Salihović 36'; Ibišević 62' (pen.); Compper 71'	Stadium: Weserstadion; Attendance: 40,059; Referee: Günter Perl

4 October 2008 7	1899 Hoffenheim	2–1	Eintracht Frankfurt	Mannheim
15:30 CEST (UTC+2)	Ba 47', 71'	Report	Steinhöfer 66'	Stadium: Carl-Benz-Stadion; Attendance: 26,300; Referee: Helmut Fleischer

18 October 2008 8	Hannover 96	2–5	1899 Hoffenheim	Hannover
15:30 CEST (UTC+2)	Schulz 47'; Štajner 63'	Report	Ibišević 35', 83'; Obasi 69'; Salihović 72'; Ba 80'	Stadium: AWD-Arena; Attendance: 42,321; Referee: Marc Seemann

26 October 2008 9	1899 Hoffenheim	3–0	Hamburger SV	Mannheim
17:00 CET (UTC+1)	Obasi 7', 36'; Ibišević 13'	Report		Stadium: Carl-Benz-Stadion; Attendance: 26,300; Referee: Wolfgang Stark

29 October 2008 10	VfL Bochum	1–3	1899 Hoffenheim	Bochum
20:00 CET (UTC+1)	Grote 2'	Report	Ba 65'; Ibišević 70' (pen.); Eduardo 71'	Stadium: Rewirpowerstadion; Attendance: 24,444; Referee: Peter Gagelmann

1 November 2008 11	1899 Hoffenheim	4–1	Karlsruher SC	Mannheim
15:30 CET (UTC+1)	Ibišević 15', 76'; Obasi 66', 78'	Report	Freis 20'	Stadium: Carl-Benz-Stadion; Attendance: 26,300; Referee: Felix Brych

9 November 2008 12	Hertha BSC	1–0	1899 Hoffenheim	Berlin
17:00 CET (UTC+1)	Voronin 70'	Report		Stadium: Olympiastadion; Attendance: 58,862; Referee: Herbert Fandel

15 November 2008 13	1899 Hoffenheim	3–2	VfL Wolfsburg	Mannheim
15:30 CET (UTC+1)	Ibišević 22'; Eduardo 37'; Obasi 69'	Report	Grafite 27'; Džeko 41'	Stadium: Carl-Benz-Stadion; Attendance: 26,000; Referee: Guido Winkmann

22 November 2008 14	1. FC Köln	1–3	1899 Hoffenheim	Cologne
15:30 CET (UTC+1)	Petit 78'	Report	Ba 31'; Ibišević 66', 87'	Stadium: RheinEnergieStadion; Attendance: 50,000; Referee: Deniz Aytekin

29 November 2008 15	1899 Hoffenheim	3–0	Arminia Bielefeld	Mannheim
15:30 CET (UTC+1)	Ibišević 4'; Eduardo 10'; Copado 88' (pen.)	Report		Stadium: Carl-Benz-Stadion; Attendance: 26,000; Referee: Michael Weiner

5 December 2008 16	Bayern Munich	2–1	1899 Hoffenheim	Munich
20:30 CET (UTC+1)	Lahm 60'; Toni 90'	Report	Ibišević 49'	Stadium: Allianz Arena; Attendance: 69,000; Referee: Florian Meyer

14 December 2008 17	1899 Hoffenheim	1–1	Schalke 04	Mannheim
17:00 CET (UTC+1)	Teber 72'	Report	Asamoah 40'	Stadium: Carl-Benz-Stadion; Attendance: 26,300; Referee: Peter Gagelmann

31 January 2009 18	1899 Hoffenheim	2–0	Energie Cottbus	Sinsheim
15:30 CET (UTC+1)	Ba 28'; Sanogo 63'	Report		Stadium: Rhein-Neckar-Arena; Attendance: 30,150; Referee: Manuel Gräfe

7 February 2009 19	Borussia Mönchengladbach	1–1	1899 Hoffenheim	Mönchengladbach
15:30 CET (UTC+1)	Baumjohann 44'	Report	Wellington 89'	Stadium: Borussia-Park; Attendance: 42,421; Referee: Lutz Wagner

13 February 2009 20	1899 Hoffenheim	1–4	Bayer Leverkusen	Sinsheim
20:30 CET (UTC+1)	Salihović 31' (pen.)	Report	Helmes 3', 45'; Rolfes 12'; Castro 48'	Stadium: Rhein-Neckar-Arena; Attendance: 30,150; Referee: Helmut Fleischer

21 February 2009 21	VfB Stuttgart	3–3	1899 Hoffenheim	Stuttgart
15:30 CET (UTC+1)	Cacau 26'; Gómez 31', 63'	Report	Ba 24', 45', 67'	Stadium: Mercedes-Benz Arena; Attendance: 54,000; Referee: Michael Kempter

28 February 2009 22	Borussia Dortmund	0–0	1899 Hoffenheim	Dortmund
15:30 CET (UTC+1)		Report		Stadium: Signal Iduna Park; Attendance: 78,800; Referee: Herbert Fandel

7 March 2009 23	1899 Hoffenheim	0–0	Werder Bremen	Sinsheim
15:30 CET (UTC+1)		Report		Stadium: Rhein-Neckar-Arena; Attendance: 30,150; Referee: Michael Weiner

14 March 2009 24	Eintracht Frankfurt	1–1	1899 Hoffenheim	Frankfurt
15:30 CET (UTC+1)	Fink 47'	Report	Eduardo 10'	Stadium: Commerzbank-Arena; Attendance: 51,500; Referee: Manuel Gräfe

21 March 2009 25	1899 Hoffenheim	2–2	Hannover 96	Sinsheim
15:30 CET (UTC+1)	Teber 20' (pen.); Wellington 84'	Report	Balitsch 22'; Eggimann 74'	Stadium: Rhein-Neckar-Arena; Attendance: 30,150; Referee: Wolfgang Stark

4 April 2009 26	Hamburger SV	1–0	1899 Hoffenheim	Hamburg
15:30 CEST (UTC+2)	Pitroipa 28'	Report		Stadium: HSH Nordbank Arena; Attendance: 57,000; Referee: Florian Meyer

11 April 2009 27	1899 Hoffenheim	0–3	VfL Bochum	Sinsheim
15:30 CEST (UTC+2)		Report	Šesták 42', 55', 69'	Stadium: Rhein-Neckar-Arena; Attendance: 30,150; Referee: Babak Rafati

18 April 2009 28	Karlsruher SC	2–2	1899 Hoffenheim	Karlsruhe
15:30 CEST (UTC+2)	Freis 33'; Federico 65'	Report	Salihović 28'; Teber 48'	Stadium: Wildparkstadion; Attendance: 29,054; Referee: Thorsten Kinhöfer

24 April 2009 29	1899 Hoffenheim	0–1	Hertha BSC	Sinsheim
20:30 CEST (UTC+2)		Report	Ebert 40'	Stadium: Rhein-Neckar-Arena; Attendance: 30,150; Referee: Wolfgang Stark

2 May 2009 30	VfL Wolfsburg	4–0	1899 Hoffenheim	Wolfsburg
15:30 CEST (UTC+2)	Džeko 65', 74', 78'; Grafite 89' (pen.)	Report		Stadium: Volkswagen-Arena; Attendance: 30,000; Referee: Peter Gagelmann

9 May 2009 31	1899 Hoffenheim	2–0	1. FC Köln	Sinsheim
15:30 CEST (UTC+2)	Salihović 58'; Ba 68'	Report		Stadium: Rhein-Neckar-Arena; Attendance: 30,150; Referee: Michael Kempter

13 May 2009 32	Arminia Bielefeld	0–2	1899 Hoffenheim	Bielefeld
20:00 CEST (UTC+2)		Report	Wellington 25'; Salihović 82' (pen.)	Stadium: SchücoArena; Attendance: 25,200; Referee: Babak Rafati

16 May 2009 33	1899 Hoffenheim	2–2	Bayern Munich	Sinsheim
15:30 CEST (UTC+2)	Ba 21'; Eduardo 29'	Report	Ribéry 16'; Toni 44'	Stadium: Rhein-Neckar-Arena; Attendance: 30,150; Referee: Michael Weiner

23 May 2009 34	Schalke 04	2–3	1899 Hoffenheim	Gelsenkirchen
15:30 CEST (UTC+2)	Krstajić 30'; Farfán 34'	Report	Ba 27'; Eduardo 49', 89' (pen.)	Stadium: Veltins-Arena; Attendance: 61,673; Referee: Markus Schmidt

=== DFB-Pokal ===
10 August 2008 First round	Chemnitzer FC	0–1	1899 Hoffenheim	Chemnitz
17:30 CEST (UTC+2)		Report	Ibišević 77'	Stadium: Stadion an der Gellertstraße; Attendance: 6,758; Referee: Günter Perl (Pullach)

24 September 2008 Second round	SC Freiburg	3–1	1899 Hoffenheim	Freiburg
20:30 CEST (UTC+2)	Schwaab 68' (pen.); Türker 84'; Idrissou 89' (pen.)	Report	Salihović 36' (pen.)	Stadium: Dreisamstadion; Attendance: 15,400; Referee: Knut Kircher (Rottenburg)
