= Marvin Compper =

German footballer (born 1985)

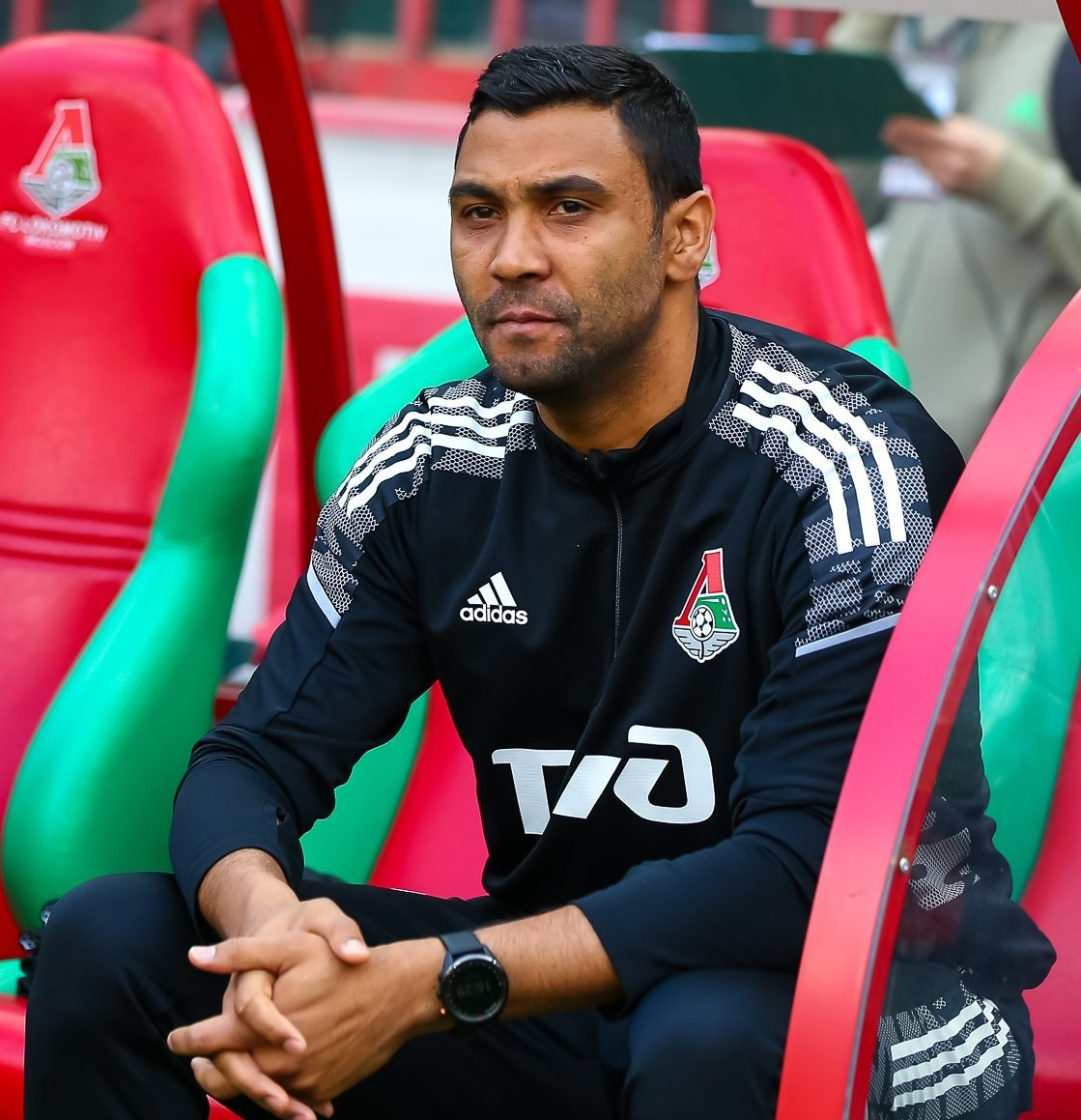
- Compper working with Lokomotiv Moscow in 2022

Personal information
- Date of birth: 14 June 1985 (age 41)
- Place of birth: Tübingen, West Germany
- Height: 1.85 m (6 ft 1 in)
- Position: Centre back

Team information
- Current team: Antwerp (manager)

Youth career
- SV Bühl
- SV 03 Tübingen
- –2002: VfB Stuttgart
- 2002–2003: Borussia Mönchengladbach

Senior career*
Years	Team	Apps	(Gls)
2003–2007	Borussia Mönchengladbach II	50	(5)
2005–2008	Borussia Mönchengladbach	31	(0)
2008–2013	1899 Hoffenheim	140	(6)
2013–2014	Fiorentina	16	(0)
2014–2017	RB Leipzig	77	(5)
2015–2016	RB Leipzig II	3	(0)
2018–2019	Celtic	0	(0)
2019–2020	MSV Duisburg	23	(1)
Total		340	(17)

International career
2005	Germany U20	3	(0)
2008	Germany	1	(0)

Managerial career
- 2020–2021: MSV Duisburg (assistant)
- 2021–2022: FC Lokomotiv Moscow (assistant)
- 2023–2024: RB Leipzig (U19 assistant)
- 2024–2026: St. Gallen (assistant)
- 2026–: Antwerp
- * Club domestic league appearances and goals

Marvin Compper (born 14 June 1985) is a German football manager and a former player who played as a centre back. He is the manager of Belgian Pro League club Antwerp. He won one cap for the Germany national team.

== Club career ==
=== Borussia Mönchengladbach ===
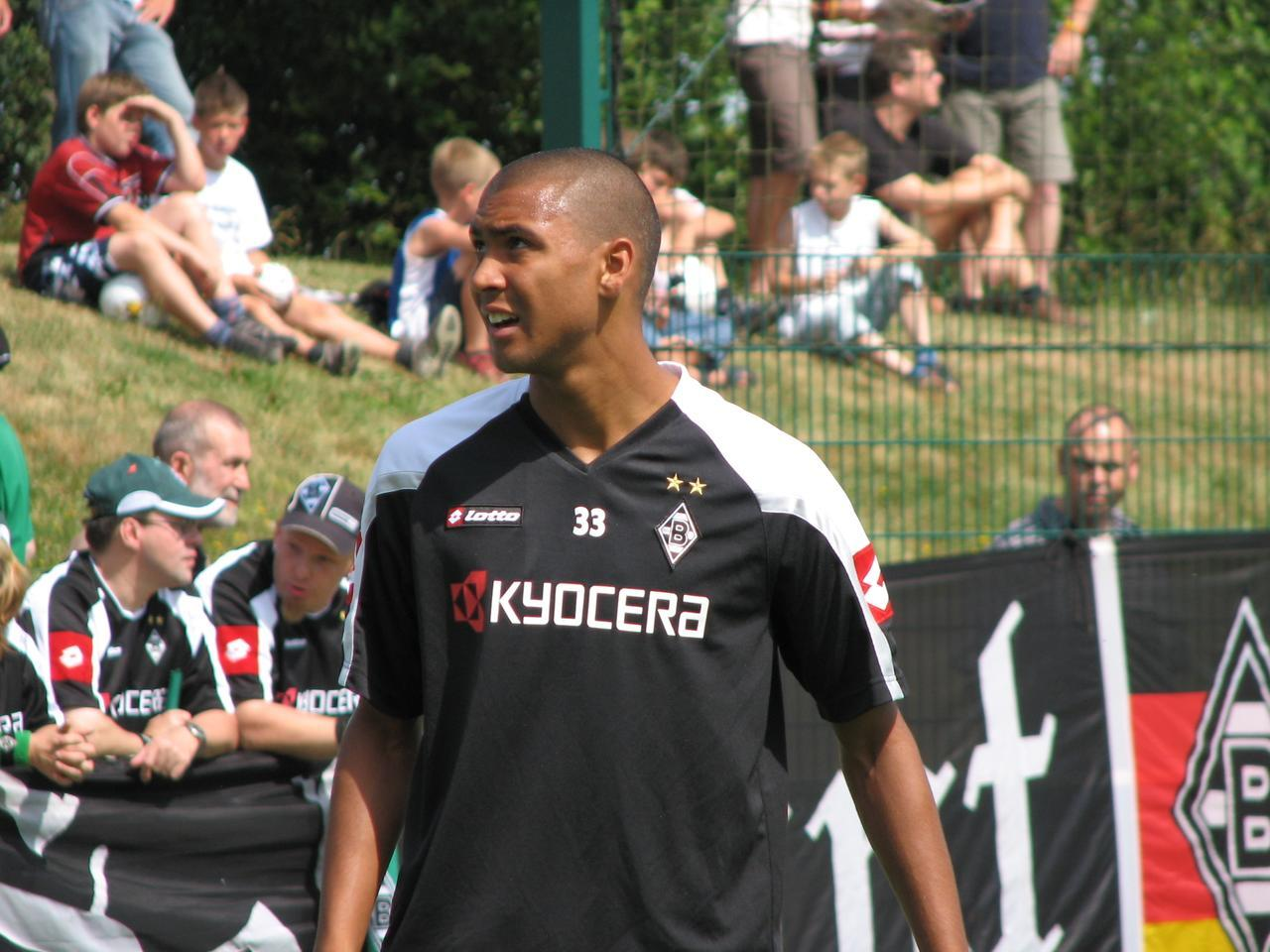
Compper in the Borussia Mönchengladbach shirt during his three–year spell there.

During the 2002–03 season, Compper moved from the youth team of the VfB Stuttgart to the amateur team of Borussia Mönchengladbach. Shortly after joining the club, he was assigned to the U19 side and eventually to the Borussia Mönchengladbach II side. In July 2005, he signed his first professional contract which ran until 2008.

Shortly after signing his first professional contract, Compper was promoted to the first team and made his debut during the 2005–06 season. His first appearance for the club came on 1 October 2005, coming on as a second–half substitute for injured Jeff Strasser, in a 1–0 loss against 1. FSV Mainz 05. Because he spent most of the season on the substitute bench, Compper ended up making only five appearances during the season.

In the 2006–07 season, Compper made four appearances for the reserve team in August 2006. On 14 October 2006, he made his first appearance (as well as his first start), in a 3–1 win over Wolfsburg. Because of the injuries of both Filip Daems and the national defender Marcell Jansen, he became a regular player in the autumn of 2006 in the Bundesliga. He had a handful of first team appearances until he was dropped from the first team after criticising Manager Jupp Heynckes following a 1–1 draw against 1. FSV Mainz 05 on 9 December 2006. On 30 January 2007, he returned to the first team from suspension, in a 0–0 draw against 1. FC Nürnberg, in what turned out to be Heynckes' last game as Manager. Following Heynckes' resignation, Compper was given more first team opportunities under new manager Jos Luhukay. He finished the season with 23 league appearances, but the club was relegated at the end of the season, finishing last in the Bundesliga table.

In the first half of the 2007–08 season, Compper played only three games for Borussia Mönchengladbach. Although he did not play regularly at Borussia Mönchengladbach, Compper reflected on his time at the club: "This is the best for my personal development. At Borussia, nobody gave me the feeling that I was needed."

=== TSG 1899 Hoffenheim ===
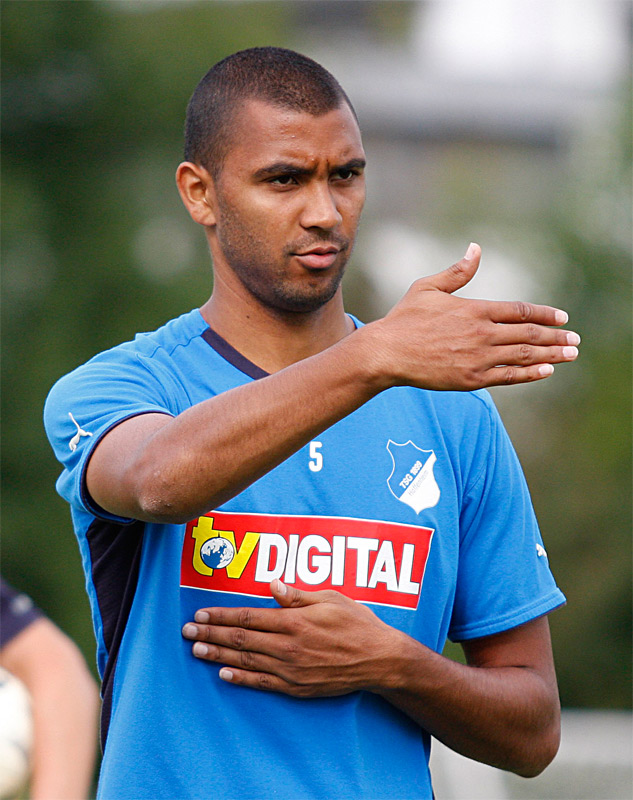
Compper with TSG 1899 Hoffenheim in 2009.

Due to a lack of first-team action, Compper joined TSG 1899 Hoffenheim in January 2008.

Compper made his TSG 1899 Hoffenheim debut on 1 February 2008, where he started the whole game in the centre–back position, in a 2–0 win over Wehen Wiesbaden. Ahead of the follow-up match against his former club, Borussia Mönchengladbach, on 10 February 2008, Compper made an interview with Bild, where he said he had no grudge on his departure from the club. He played the whole match against his former club, where he set up a goal for Demba Ba, in a 4–2 win. Compper quickly established himself in the first team, where he played in mostly at centre–back. He was also in the squad that won promotion to the Bundesliga after beating Greuther Fürth 5–0 in the last game of the season. At the end of the 2007–08 season that saw TSG 1899 Hoffenheim promoted to the Bundesliga, Compper had made a total of 19 appearances in all competitions.

Compper started the 2008–09 season when he helped the club win the first Bundesliga match, in a 3–0 win over Energie Cottbus. He continued to remain his first team, playing in the centre–back position. On 27 September 2008, he scored his first goal in a 5–4 loss against Werder Bremen. He helped the side with wins that led to them being at the top of the table until January. However, the club's form soon suffered that ended up losing their spot at the top of the table and Compper, himself, suffered setbacks despite having playing time. He captained the side for the first time on 2 May 2009, where he played the whole game, in a 4–0 loss against Wolfsburg. Despite being further setbacks during the 2008–09 season, Compper finished his full season at the club, making the total of 32 appearances and scoring once in all competitions.

In the 2009–10 season, Compper, continued to remain his first team, playing in the centre–back position. He scored his first goal of the season on 12 September 2009 in a 3–0 win over VfL Bochum. His performance resulted in him signing a contract extension that would him until 2013. Despite being on the sidelines on two occasions in the 2009–10 season, he went on to make a total of 35 appearances and scoring twice in all competitions.

In the 2010–11 season, Compper started the opening game of the season well when he set up a goal for Peniel Mlapa, in a 4–1 win over Werder Bremen. He started out playing in the left–back position when Manager Ralf Rangnick preferred Isaac Vorsah and Josip Šimunić as their centre–backs instead. Compper started every match until he suffered a back injury that kept him out of the game for two matches. He returned to the centre–back position, where he started the whole game, in a 3–2 win over Borussia Mönchengladbach on 17 October 2010. Following this, he managed to regain his role as a centre–back position for the rest of the season. On 18 December 2010, Compper scored his first goal of the season in a 1–1 draw against Nürnberg. However, in late March, Compper found himself in an incident with teammate Sejad Salihović at training; the two later resolved their differences.

Ahead of the 2011–12 season, Compper was linked with a move away from TSG 1899 Hoffenheim, with La Liga side Sevilla among interested. Despite this, he stayed at the club and started the season, continuing to play in the centre–back position under the new management of Holger Stanislawski. In a 0–0 draw against Bayern Munich on 1 October 2011, Compper's performance was praised by Stanislawski and he was named Man of the Match. He started in every match since the opening game of the season until his sending off in the final minutes of the game after fouling Tomáš Pekhart, in a 2–0 win over Nürnberg on 10 December 2011. After serving a two match suspension, Compper was again sent–off in the first half for a foul, in a 1–0 loss against Greuther Fürth in the quarter–final; in what turned out to be Stanislawski's last game as Manager. Despite the sending off, Compper then scored his first goal for the club, in a 1–1 draw against Köln on 4 March 2012. At the end of the 2011–12 season, Compper went on to make a total of 33 appearances and scoring two times in all competitions.

In the 2012–13 season, Compper continued to feature in the first team as a centre–back position after an appointment of Markus Babbel. In absence of Tim Wiese, Compper was given the captaincy role in September 2012. The club won back to back matches against Hannover 96 and Stuttgart. He started in every match until his sending off for a second bookable offence, in a 1–1 draw against Fortuna Düsseldorf on 10 November 2012. Compper also captained the side four more times until he was dropped from the first team in January 2013 over a comment he made about the club. As a result, he was demoted to the U23 side. In addition to being dropped, Compper was in a contract negotiations. By the time of his departure, Compper made 16 appearances in the 2012–13 season.

=== Fiorentina ===
In January 2013, Compper signed for Serie A side Fiorentina, signing a three–year contract for an undisclosed fee. He later revealed that the contract length was actually two years.

After starting several matches as an unused substitute on the bench, Compper made his Fiorentina debut, starting the whole game in the centre–back, in a 2–2 draw against ChievoVerona on 3 March 2013. He then had a number of first team appearances towards the end of the season. At the end of the 2012–13 season, Compper had made a total of seven appearances for the side.

At the start of the 2013–14 season, Compper appeared in the first two matches of the season. However, he was soon on the substitute bench and struggled for a place the first team, as he faced competition in the central defence position. On 23 January 2014, he scored a late winner against Siena in the quarter-finals of the Coppa Italia, as Fiorentina recorded a 2–1 victory. Despite suffering from an injury later in the season, Compper finished his second season, making 19 appearances and scoring once in all competitions.

In the summer transfer window of 2014, Compper was expected to leave the club, as his first team opportunities at Fiorentina became limited. As a result, he was dropped from the squad ahead of the club's pre–season tour.

=== RB Leipzig ===
On 2 August 2014, Compper joined 2. Bundesliga side RB Leipzig, signing a three–year contract. He was previously heavily linked with a move to Hellas Verona over the summer. However, it was made clear he wanted to play in the Bundesliga before joining RB Leipzig. Upon joining the club, he was given a number 33 shirt ahead of the new season.

After being an unused substitute in the first two matches, Compper made his RB Leipzig debut on 22 August 2014, where he came on as a substitute for injured Niklas Hoheneder, in a 1–0 win over Erzgebirge Aue. Since making his debut, Compper started every match for the side, alongside Tim Sebastain and Lukas Klostermann in the central–defence position. This lasted until Compper was suspended for a yellow bookable offence in February 2015. After returning, Compper was given the captaincy for a match against FSV Frankfurt on 15 February 2015, which they lost 1–0. His return was short–lived when he was sent–off in the first half, in a 0–0 draw against Karlsruher SC on 9 March 2015, resulting in him serving a two match ban. Despite being on the sidelines later in the 2014–15 season, Compper finished his first season, making a total of 27 appearances in all competitions.

However, at the start of the 2015–16 season, Compper suffered a knee injury that kept him out of the first team for months. After returning to training from injury in September, he was assigned to the reserve side in order to regain his fitness. On 4 October 2015, he made his first appearance since returning from injury in a 3–2 win over 1. FC Nürnberg. Following his return, Compper regained his first team place despite facing new competitions this season. He was given a handful of first team appearances until he suffered a muscle injury that kept him out for two weeks in December 2015. Compper scored on his return from injury two months later on 7 February 2016, in a 2–0 win over Eintracht Braunschweig. Compper later helped the club get promoted to the Bundesliga for the first time after beating Karlsruher SC 2–0 on 8 May 2016. At the end of the 2015–16 season, he had made a total of 23 appearances and scoring three times in all competitions.

Despite struggling to regain his fitness ahead of the 2016–17 season, Compper managed to regain his first team place in central defence at the start of the season. He appeared in every match for the side since the start of the season. However, in November 2016, Compper suffered a tear in a joint capsule that kept him out for the whole year. Compper then scored on his return from injury on 21 January 2017, in a 3–0 win over Eintracht Frankfurt. Since returning from injury, Compper continued to regain his first team place towards the end of the season and helped the side finish in the second place to qualify for the UEFA Champions League next season. Despite being sidelined on three occasions later in the 2016–17 season, he went on to make a total of 26 appearances and scoring twice in all competitions. At the end of the 2016–17 season, Compper signed a contract extension until 2019.

Ahead of the 2017–18 season, Compper suffered a calf injury during the club's pre–season tour. Despite returning to training from injury, just in time for the league started, Compper, however, found himself on the substitute bench, as he was fallen behind Willi Orban, Dayot Upamecano, Ibrahima Konaté and Stefan Ilsanker. This was also combined with a strained relationship with Manager Ralph Hasenhüttl. By the time of his departure, Compper made three appearances for the side in the first half of 2017–18 season.

=== Celtic ===
It was reported that Celtic had a £1 million bid accepted from RB Leipzig for Compper. Compper agreed a move to Scottish Premiership club Celtic in December 2017, with the deal to take effect on 1 January 2018. He never made a league appearance for the Scottish giants in one and half years.

=== MSV Duisburg ===
On 2 July 2019, he signed for MSV Duisburg. On 1 August 2020, he announced his retirement and moved to the coaching staff.

== International career ==
Compper was eligible to play for Germany and France, as he got a citizenship.

Having previously represented the Germany U17 and Germany U18 side, Compper was called up by Germany U20 for the first time, making his debut against Italy U20 on 16 February 2005. Three months after making his debut, Compper was called to the Germany U20 squad for the FIFA World Youth Championship in Netherlands. After appearing twice as a substitute in the first two matches, he played his first match of the tournament, where he came on as a second–half substitute, in a 1–0 loss against Argentina U20 on 18 June 2005. Compper started for the first time in the tournament, as Germany U20 lost 2–1 to Brazil after the game went to extra time, eliminating the side from the competitions. He went on to make eleven appearances for the U20 side.

On 13 November 2008, Compper was called up by Germany for the first time. Five days later after being called up again, on 19 November 2008, Compper received his sole international cap in a friendly against England, making him the first Hoffenheim player to be capped by Germany. After the match, Compper reflected on his debut, saying: "I was very happy to play from the start, but my debut was only marred by the defeat, it's a shame we could not finish the year successfully."

== Coaching career ==
On 26 October 2021, Compper was hired by Russian Premier League club FC Lokomotiv Moscow as an assistant coach. On 1 March 2022, Lokomotiv manager Markus Gisdol resigned due to the Russian invasion of Ukraine and Compper was appointed caretaker manager. Dmitri Loskov and then Oleg Pashinin were officially registered with the league as Lokomotiv's caretaker managers as Compper did not possess the mandatory UEFA Pro Licence. On 4 April 2022, Zaur Khapov was appointed Lokomotiv manager, but club's sporting director Thomas Zorn commented that this is a formality as Khapov possesses a proper license, and Compper will continue performing most of the manager's duties. On 30 June 2022, Josef Zinnbauer was appointed head coach of Lokomotiv, with Compper continuing to work at the club. Compper was dismissed by Lokomotiv on 5 September 2022, following a weak start of the 2022–23 season.

On 3 August 2026, Compper was hired as the head coach of Belgian Pro League club Antwerp with a two-season contract.

== Career statistics ==
=== Club ===
As of match played 4 July 2020

Appearances and goals by club, season and competition
Club	Season	League			National Cup		League Cup		Continental		Total	
Club	Season	Division	Apps	Goals	Apps	Goals	Apps	Goals	Apps	Goals	Apps	Goals
Borussia Mönchengladbach	2005–06	Bundesliga	5	0	0	0	—		0	0	5	0
Borussia Mönchengladbach	2006–07	Bundesliga	23	0	0	0	—		0	0	23	0
Borussia Mönchengladbach	2007–08	2. Bundesliga	3	0	0	0	—		0	0	3	0
Borussia Mönchengladbach	Total		31	0	0	0	0	0	0	0	31	0
1899 Hoffenheim	2008–09	Bundesliga	30	1	0	0	—		0	0	30	1
1899 Hoffenheim	2009–10	Bundesliga	32	1	3	1	—		0	0	35	2
1899 Hoffenheim	2010–11	Bundesliga	32	2	4	0	—		0	0	36	2
1899 Hoffenheim	2011–12	Bundesliga	30	2	3	0	—		0	0	33	2
1899 Hoffenheim	2012–13	Bundesliga	16	0	0	0	—		0	0	16	0
1899 Hoffenheim	Total		140	6	10	1	0	0	0	0	150	7
Fiorentina	2012–13	Serie A	7	0	0	0	—		0	0	7	0
Fiorentina	2013–14	Serie A	9	0	3	0	—		7 (Note: Appearances in the Europa League)	0	19	0
Fiorentina	Total		16	0	3	0	0	0	7	0	26	0
RB Leipzig	2014–15	2. Bundesliga	27	0	0	0	—		0	0	27	0
RB Leipzig	2015–16	2. Bundesliga	23	3	0	0	—		0	0	23	3
RB Leipzig	2016–17	Bundesliga	25	2	1	0	—		0	0	26	2
RB Leipzig	2017–18	Bundesliga	2	0	0	0	—		1 (Note: Appearance in the Champions League)	0	3	0
RB Leipzig	Total		77	5	1	0	0	0	1	0	79	5
Celtic	2017–18	Scottish Premiership	0	0	1	0	0	0	0	0	1	0
Celtic	2018–19	Scottish Premiership	0	0	0	0	0	0	0	0	0	0
MSV Duisburg	2019–20	3. Liga	23	1	1	0	—		—		24	1
Career total			287	12	16	1	0	0	8	0	311	13

=== International ===
Germany
Year	Apps	Goals
2008	1	0
Total	1	0

== Personal life ==
Born in Tübingen, West Germany to a German mother and French father from Guadeloupe, Compper has French citizenship, due to his father's origins. Growing up, Compper was a fan of Paris Saint-Germain, idolising George Weah and David Ginola.

Compper had a son, Elijah, with his wife Cathrin and their second child was born in August 2017.

== Honours ==
=== Club ===
1899 Hoffenheim

- 2. Bundesliga promotion: 2007–08

RB Leipzig

- 2. Bundesliga promotion: 2015–16
