= Andreas Beck (footballer) =

German footballer (born 1987)

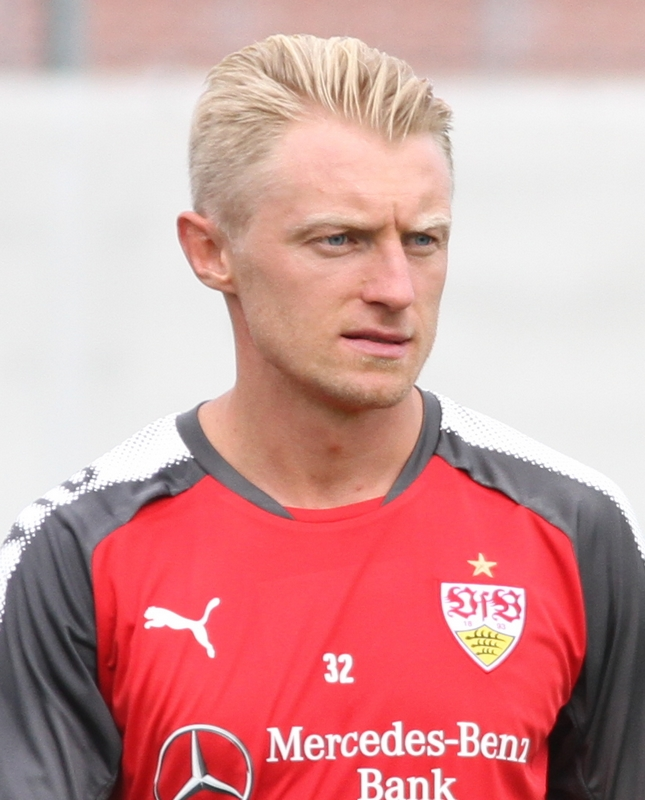
- Beck with VfB Stuttgart in 2017

Personal information
- Full name: Andreas Beck
- Date of birth: 13 March 1987 (age 39)
- Place of birth: Kemerovo, Soviet Union
- Height: 1.80 m (5 ft 11 in)
- Position: Right-back

Youth career
- SVH Königsbronn
- –2000: DJK-SG Wasseralfingen
- 2000–2005: VfB Stuttgart

Senior career*
Years	Team	Apps	(Gls)
2005–2007	VfB Stuttgart II	23	(1)
2006–2008	VfB Stuttgart	27	(1)
2008–2015	1899 Hoffenheim	216	(3)
2015–2017	Beşiktaş	52	(0)
2017–2019	VfB Stuttgart	47	(1)
2019–2022	Eupen	77	(2)

International career
2006–2007	Germany U18	3	(0)
2007	Germany U19	3	(0)
2007	Germany U20	1	(0)
2006–2009	Germany U21	27	(2)
2009–2010	Germany	9	(0)
Medal record
Men's football
Representing Germany
UEFA European Under-21 Championship
Winner	2009 Sweden
- * Club domestic league appearances and goals

Andreas Beck (German pronunciation: [anˈdʁeːas ˈbɛk]; born 13 March 1987) is a former professional footballer who played as a right-back. Born in the Soviet Union, he represented Germany at youth and senior levels.

== Early life ==
Beck was born to Russia German parents in Kemerovo, USSR (now Russia). When he was three, his family emigrated to Germany. "I will never forget that we lived in a caravan at first."

Beck also has a brother named Arthur. Beck's grandmother resides in St. Petersburg, Russia.

== Club career ==
=== VfB Stuttgart ===
Beck started his football career at DJK-SG Wasseralfingen and SVH Köningsbronn before the age of 14. He then transferred to VfB Stuttgart and in 2005, Beck signed a professional contract with the club. The following year, Beck made his Bundesliga debut for Stuttgart on 11 February 2006 against Arminia Bielefeld. Five days later he experienced his European debut with a substitute appearance in the intermediate round of the UEFA cup against the Middlesbrough. The following week saw Beck signing a contract extension, keeping him until 2010.

Following Andreas Hinkel's departure to Sevilla, Beck was promoted to the first team and was expected to replace Hinkel as a right-back. However, Beck failed to do so, with Ricardo Osorio establishing himself in the team, playing as a right-back throughout the 2006–07 season. At the end of the 2006–07 season, Beck had made four appearances for the club, as they won the Bundesliga for the first time since 1992.

In the 2007–08 season, Beck started the season being on the bench until he made his first appearance on matchday 10 coming on as a substitute for Yıldıray Baştürk in the 86th minute, in a 4–1 loss against Hamburg on 20 October 2007. Beck scored his first goal for Stuttgart in the next appearance on 27 October 2007 against Bayer Leverkusen which resulted in a 1–0 win for Stuttgart. Beck then played a vital role when he provided assists in two of the Champions League matches against Lyon and Rangers. But during a match against Rangers, Beck suffered a knee ligament injury and was sidelined for months. Shortly after, Beck was linked with a move away from the club after considering his future away from the club. However, Beck announced his intention to stay at the club Two months later on 3 February 2008, Beck made his first team return in a 4–0 loss against Schalke 04. In his second season at Stuttgart, Beck made eighteen appearances for the club.

=== 1899 Hoffenheim ===
After failing to secure a place in the starting eleven for Stuttgart, Beck decided to leave the club to look for a new challenge. 1899 Hoffenheim made a bid for Beck, which was rejected. Ralf Rangnick was keen to sign Beck and eventually he moved to Hoffenheim for a transfer fee about €3 million on a four-year deal in July 2008.

Beck made his debut for Hoffenheim in a DFB-Pokal match as they won 1–0 against Chemnitz on 10 August 2008. Beck made his league debut for Hoffenheim, playing as a right-back, in a 3–0 win against Energie Cottbus on 16 August 2008. After joining, Beck later established himself as a key member of the side and got more playing time than at Stuttgart. After missing three matches due to a gastrointestinal virus, Beck made his return to the first team in the last game of the season, in a 3–2 win over Schalke 04. In his first season, Beck made 30 league appearances and had two assists. Only Tobias Weis and Demba Ba were on more missions over the course of the season.

In the 2009–10 season, Beck continued to remain as right-back in the first team. Beck suffered a hamstring injury that kept him out for six weeks. Beck made his first team return, playing as a right-back, in a 2–0 loss against Bayern Munich on 15 January 2010. Once again, Beck suffered a knee injury, which kept him out for aboutfive weeks. Beck made his first team return, coming on as a substitute for Christian Eichner in 72nd minute, in a 0–0 draw against Nürnberg on 20 March 2010. In his second season at the club, Beck made twenty-five appearances for the club.

In the 2010–11 season, Beck was announced as new captain for the club, succeeding former captain Per Nilsson, who left for Nürnberg. Upon learning this, Beck quoted: "I'm happy about having been given this responsibility. But my priority remains to work for the success of the club and nothing else."|Beck on being a captain." Beck also stated being captain is big responsibility on and off the pitch. He played his first match as captain on 14 August 2010 as the club won 4–0 in the DFB-Pokal first round encounter against Hansa Rostock. Beck also captained his first league match seven days later, in a 4–1 win over Werder Bremen in the opening game of the season. Beck was almost ever present in the 2010–11 season, making thirty-three appearances, having missed only one game due to suspension after being booked five times during the season. In May 2011, Hoffenheim 1899 claimed Juventus made an approach for Beck as the Italian side held a long-term interest in Beck. But Juventus' interests in Beck were put back on hold after Luigi Del Neri was sacked at Juventus. Hoffenheim accepted a bid for Beck from Juventus; however, the move was put off by Hoffenheim's evaluation of the 24-year-old. Afterwards, Juventus were not interested in signing Beck and he was expected to play next season.

In the 2011–12 season, Beck continued to be in first team and retained his captaincy. On 14 October 2011, Beck extended his deal with Hoffenheim by a further two years to 2014. In November 2011, Beck made only one appearance due to a yellow card suspension and suffering a calf injury. Beck scored his first goal for the club in a 3–2 loss against Nürnberg on 28 April 2012. Beck made 31 appearances and scored once in the 2011–12 season.

Ahead of the 2012–13 season, Beck announced his intention to voluntarily resign as captain and the newly signed Tim Wiese succeeded him as captain. After not being included in a squad against Frankfurt on 1 September 2012, Beck made his first team return on 23 September 2012, in a 3–1 win over Hannover 96. However, following Wiese's injury, Beck was captain for the match against Nürnberg on 28 November 2012, which they lost 4–2. In the wake of Markus Babbel's sacking, Beck criticised Babbel after disagreements. After Wiese was stripped of the captaincy, Beck was permanently given the captaincy. Beck scored his first goal of the season in a 2–2 draw against Wolfsburg on 13 April 2013. Beck made 31 appearances and scored once in the 2012–13 season in which he helped the club survive relegation.

In the 2013–14 season, Beck continued to make an impressive display in the pre-season friendly matches, so Beck remained captain for another season under the new management of Markus Gisdol. Beck then scored his first goal of the season, in a 3–0 win over Hamburg on 1 February 2014. During a match against Mainz 05 on 15 March 2014, which Hoffenheim lost 4–2, Beck unintentionally knocked the cameraman, causing him to become unconscious and resulting him to go on hospital. With his contract expiring in the summer, Beck was linked a move away from Hoffenheim, prompting the club's management to issue an ultimatum to sign a new contract until April. Eventually, Beck signed a contract with the club, keeping him until 2017. Beck was almost ever present in the 2013–14 season, making thirty-three appearances.

In the 2014–15 season, Beck continued to remain the club's captain. Beck was almost ever present in the 2014–15 season, making thirty-three appearances, having missed one game, due to suspension after being booked five times during the season.

=== Beşiktaş ===
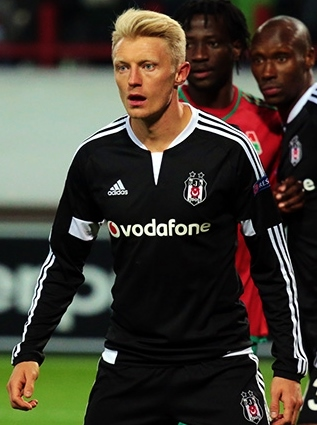
Beck with Beşiktaş in 2015

On 4 July 2015, Beck signed a three-year contract with Turkish club Beşiktaş.

=== Return to VfB Stuttgart ===
On 31 August 2017, Beck returned to VfB Stuttgart. In June 2019, the club announced that Beck will leave Stuttgart after the end of his contract.

=== Eupen ===
On 4 July 2019, Beck joined K.A.S. Eupen.

== International career ==
Beck was eligible for Germany and Russia.

On 21 February 2007, he played his first game for the U21 Squad against Italy, having previously played three games for the U19 and U18 of the DFB. Beck then scored his first Germany U21 goal in a friendly match, in a 2–2 draw against Republic of Ireland U21 on 21 August 2007.

Due to his good performance for Hoffenheim, Beck was called up on 5 February 2009 for the Germany national football team and made his debut against Norway in Düsseldorf. His debut against Norway also earned his former club, Stuttgart, 500,000 € extra as a result of an activated clause.

His largest international success was the win of the UEFA European Under-21 Championships 2009 in Sweden under manager Horst Hrubesch. He scored the only goal against Italy U21 to send Germany to the final. He played the full 90 minutes against England U21 in the final and helped the team to keep a clean sheet in the 4–0 win.

Beck was included on the 30-man preliminary roster for the 2010 FIFA World Cup, but did not make it to the final 23 man squad by Joachim Löw as he favoured Dennis Aogo and Holger Badstuber. He scored two goals against an Eppan U20 XI team in a warm-up game as a part of the preparations for the upcoming tournament. However these goals were not scored in a full international game so they are not counted as international caps or goals.

After being left out of the squad, Beck believed his exclusion from the squad would help accelerate his development as a person and a footballer.

== Career statistics ==
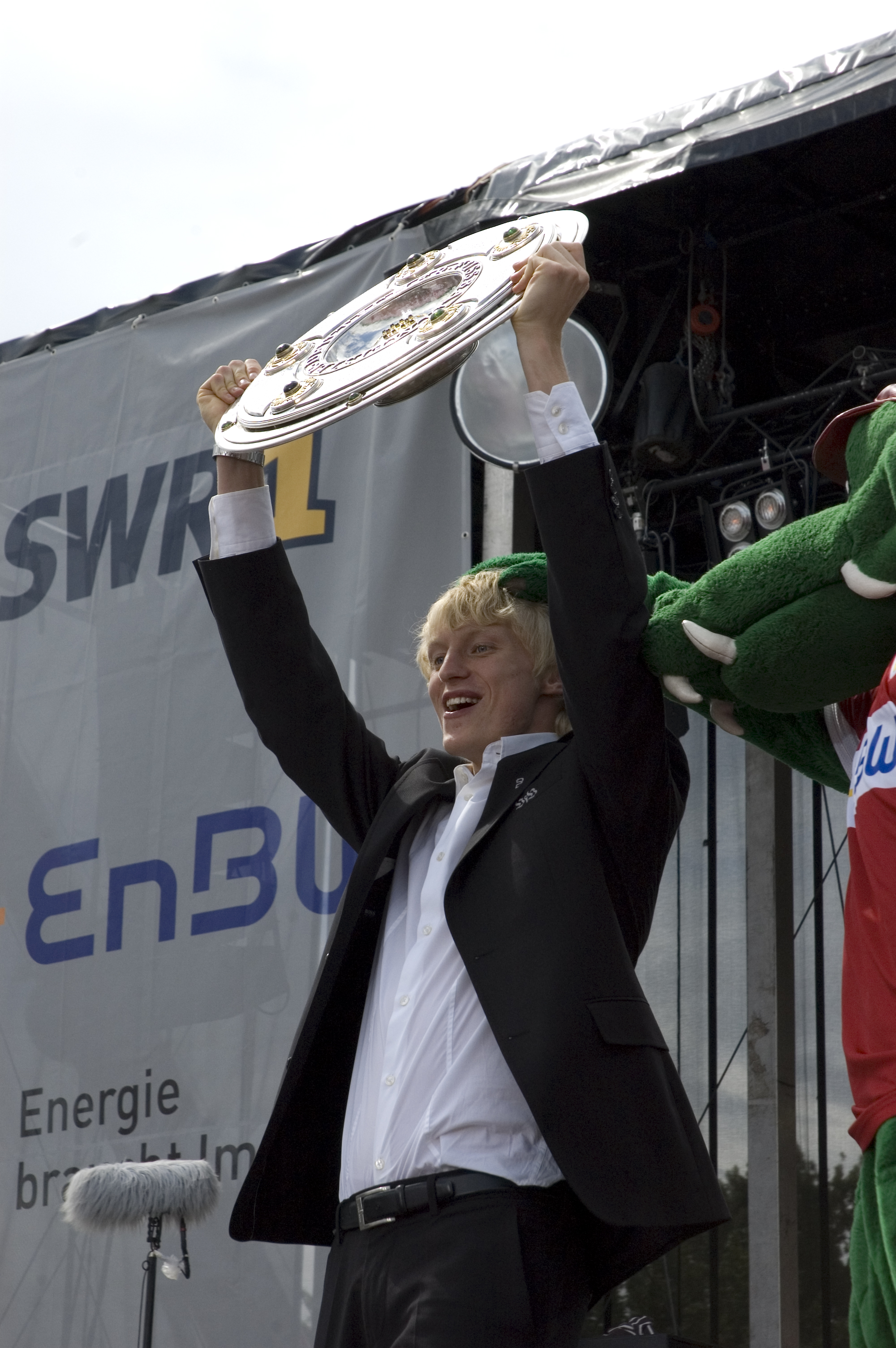
Beck celebrates winning the Bundesliga with VfB Stuttgart in 2007

Appearances and goals by club, season and competition
Club	Season	League			Cup		Continental		Other		Total		Ref.
Club	Season	Division	Apps	Goals	Apps	Goals	Apps	Goals	Apps	Goals	Apps	Goals	Ref.
VfB Stuttgart	2005–06	Bundesliga	5	0	0	0	1 (Note: Appearances in the UEFA Cup)	0	—		6	0	
VfB Stuttgart	2006–07	Bundesliga	4	0	1	0	—		—		5	0	
VfB Stuttgart	2007–08	Bundesliga	18	1	3	0	2 (Note: Appearances in the UEFA Champions League)	0	1 (Note: Appearances in the German League Cup)	0	24	1	
VfB Stuttgart	Total		27	1	4	0	3	0	1	0	35	1	—
VfB Stuttgart II	2005–06	Regionalliga Süd	12	1	—		—		—		12	1	
VfB Stuttgart II	2006–07	Regionalliga Süd	11	0	—		—		—		11	0	
VfB Stuttgart II	Total		23	1	—		—		—		23	1	—
1899 Hoffenheim	2008–09	Bundesliga	30	0	2	0	—		—		32	0	
1899 Hoffenheim	2009–10	Bundesliga	25	0	1	0	—		—		26	0	
1899 Hoffenheim	2010–11	Bundesliga	33	0	4	0	—		—		37	0	
1899 Hoffenheim	2011–12	Bundesliga	31	1	4	0	—		—		35	1	
1899 Hoffenheim	2012–13	Bundesliga	31	1	1	0	—		2 (Note: Appearances in the Bundesliga relegation playoff)	0	34	1	
1899 Hoffenheim	2013–14	Bundesliga	33	1	4	0	—		—		37	1	
1899 Hoffenheim	2014–15	Bundesliga	33	0	3	0	—		—		36	0	
1899 Hoffenheim	Total		216	3	19	0	—		2	0	237	3	—
Beşiktaş	2015–16	Süper Lig	32	0	4	0	6 (Note: Appearances in the UEFA Europa League)	0	—		42	0	
Beşiktaş	2016–17	Süper Lig	17	0	4	1	8	0	1 (Note: Appearances in the Turkish Super Cup)	0	30	1	
Beşiktaş	2017–18	Süper Lig	3	0	0	0	0	0	1	0	4	0	
Beşiktaş	Total		52	0	8	1	14	0	2	0	76	1	—
VfB Stuttgart	2017–18	Bundesliga	23	1	2	0	—		—		25	1	
VfB Stuttgart	2018–19	Bundesliga	24	0	0	0	—		—		24	0	
VfB Stuttgart	Total		47	1	2	0	—		—		49	1	—
Eupen	2019–20	Belgian First Division A	27	1	1	0	—		—		28	1	
Eupen	2020–21	Belgian First Division A	19	0	1	0	—		1 (Note: Appearances in Club Friendlies)	0	21	0	
Eupen	2021–22	Belgian First Division A	31	1	4	0	—		—		35	1	
Eupen	2022–23	Belgian First Division A	0	0	0	0	—		—		0	0	
Eupen	Total		77	2	6	0	—		1	0	84	2	
Career total			439	8	39	1	17	0	6	0	501	9	—

== Honours ==
VfB Stuttgart

- Bundesliga: 2006–07

Beşiktaş

- Süper Lig: 2015–16, 2016–17

Germany U21

- UEFA European Under-21 Championship: 2009
