= Alfred Schön =

German footballer and manager

Personal information
- Date of birth: 12 January 1962 (age 64)
- Place of birth: Wiesloch, West Germany
- Height: 1.83 m (6 ft 0 in)
- Position: Midfielder

Senior career*
Years	Team	Apps	(Gls)
1980–1988	Waldhof Mannheim	228	(12)
1988–1990	Stuttgarter Kickers	64	(1)
1990–1991	Waldhof Mannheim	36	(2)
1991–1993	Nancy		
1993–1994	Carl Zeiss Jena	12	(0)

Managerial career
- 2005–2006: TSG Hoffenheim
- TSG Hoffenheim II
- * Club domestic league appearances and goals

Alfred Schön (born 12 January 1962) is a German football manager and former player.
