= Robin Neupert =

German footballer (born 1991)

Personal information
- Date of birth: 19 August 1991 (age 35)
- Place of birth: Heilbronn, Germany
- Position: Central defender

Team information
- Current team: Neckarsulmer SU
- Number: 4

Youth career
- SV Neckarsulm
- VfB Stuttgart
- –2006: FC Heilbronn
- 2006–2009: 1899 Hoffenheim

Senior career*
Years	Team	Apps	(Gls)
2009–2012	1899 Hoffenheim II	70	(4)
2012–2014	Preußen Münster	25	(0)
2014–2016	Waldhof Mannheim	36	(0)
2016–	Neckarsulmer SU	17	(2)

International career
2010–2011	Germany U-20	4	(0)
- * Club domestic league appearances and goals as of 24 March 2017

Robin Neupert (born 19 August 1991) is a German footballer who currently plays for Neckarsulmer SU.

== Career ==
Neupert began his career with TSG 1899 Hoffenheim and spent three years playing for the reserve team before joining 3. Liga side Preußen Münster in 2012. He made his debut for the club in the second match of the 2012–13 season, replacing Philip Heise in a 1–0 win over Chemnitzer FC.
