= Jonas Strifler =

German footballer

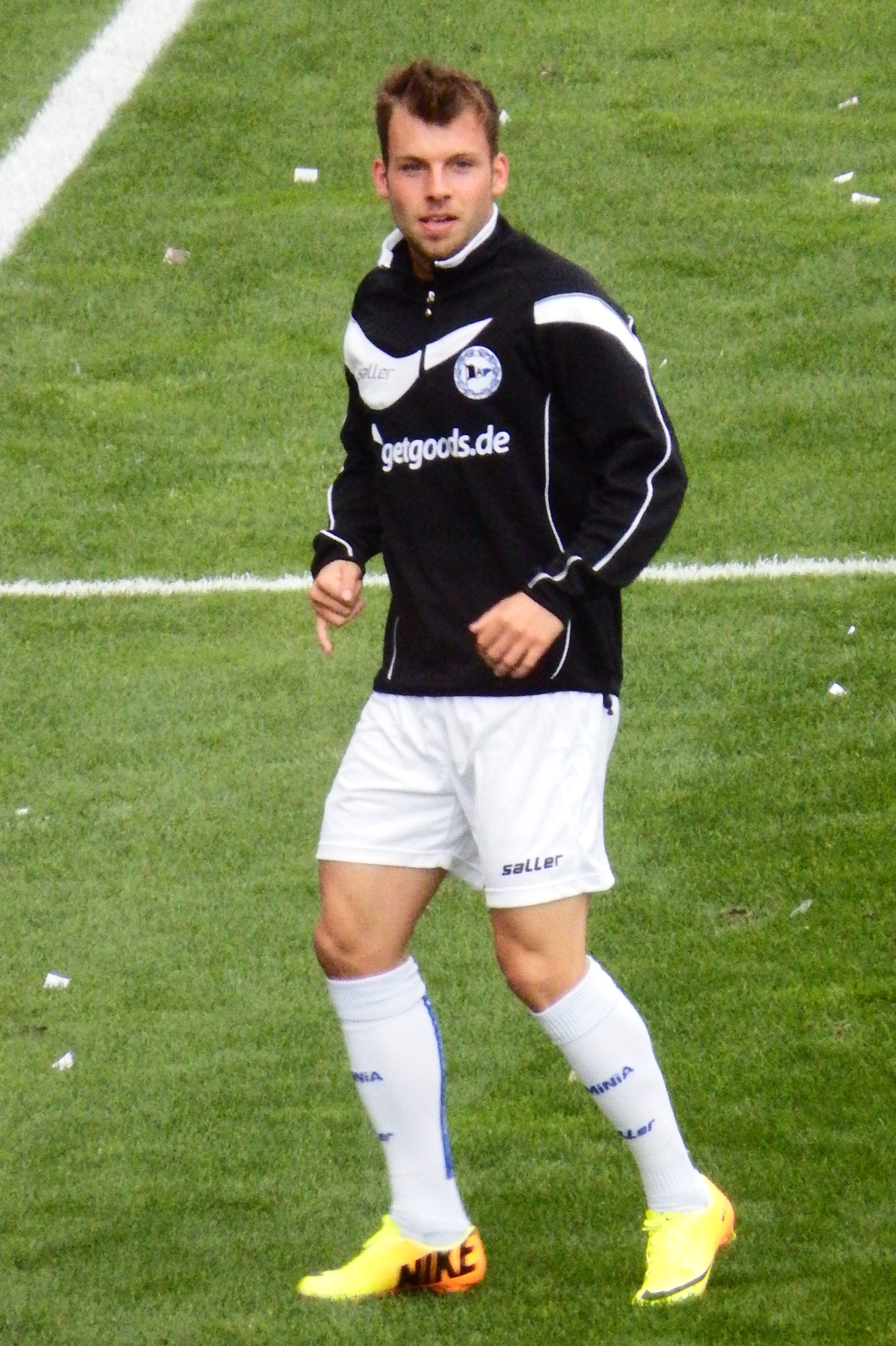

Personal information
- Date of birth: 30 January 1990 (age 36)
- Place of birth: Schwetzingen, West Germany
- Height: 1.74 m (5 ft 9 in)
- Positions: Defender; midfielder

Youth career
- –2004: Karlsruher SC
- 2004–2007: 1899 Hoffenheim

Senior career*
Years	Team	Apps	(Gls)
2007–2009	1899 Hoffenheim II	2	(0)
2008–2009	1899 Hoffenheim	0	(0)
2009–2011	Dynamo Dresden	55	(0)
2011–2012	Alemannia Aachen	4	(0)
2012–2013	Wacker Burghausen	14	(0)
2013–2016	Arminia Bielefeld	37	(0)
2016–2017	Waldhof Mannheim	16	(0)
2017	SC Verl	14	(0)
2017–2018	FC Schalke 04 II	4	(0)
Total		146	(0)

International career
- Germany Youth
- * Club domestic league appearances and goals

Jonas Strifler (born 30 January 1990) is a German retired footballer who played as a defender or midfielder.

== Career ==
Strifler played as a youth for Karlsruher SC and 1899 Hoffenheim, being promoted to Hoffenheim's reserve team in 2007. He was given a first-team squad number for the 2008-09 season, Hoffenheim's first Bundesliga season, but did not make a first-team appearance.

In September 2009 he signed for Dynamo Dresden and made his debut shortly afterwards, playing at right-back in a 3. Liga match against VfL Osnabrück. He joined Alemannia Aachen in July 2011 but was released a season later after the club were relegated to the 3. Liga, later signing for Wacker Burghausen. He left Burghausen in January 2013, signing for Arminia Bielefeld shortly afterwards.

Strifler has represented Germany at Under-18 and Under-19 level.
