= Boris Vukčević =

German footballer (born 1990)

Personal information
- Full name: Boris Vukčević
- Date of birth: 16 March 1990 (age 36)
- Place of birth: Osijek, SFR Yugoslavia
- Height: 1.82 m (5 ft 11 1/2 in)
- Position: Midfielder

Youth career
- 1995–2000: SV Staufenberg
- 2000–2005: VfL Sindelfingen
- 2005–2006: SV Böblingen
- 2006–2008: VfB Stuttgart
- 2008–2009: TSG 1899 Hoffenheim

Senior career*
Years	Team	Apps	(Gls)
2008–2011	TSG 1899 Hoffenheim II	20	(2)
2009–2014	TSG 1899 Hoffenheim	78	(6)

International career^{‡}
2008	Germany U19	1	(0)
2009–2010	Germany U20	2	(0)
2010–2012	Germany U21	6	(0)
- * Club domestic league appearances and goals as of 24 July 2014 ‡ National team caps and goals as of 10 September 2012

Boris Vukčević (born 16 March 1990) is a German former professional footballer who played as a midfielder. Due to the aftermaths of a car accident in 2012 he retired prematurely in 2014.

== Club career ==
He made his debut in the Fußball-Bundesliga on 23 May 2009 for TSG 1899 Hoffenheim in a game against FC Schalke 04.

== Personal life ==
On 28 September 2012, Vukčević was involved in a traffic accident near Bammental, when his Mercedes-Benz C63 AMG Coupé collided with a truck. He underwent an emergency surgery at the University Hospital Heidelberg and was placed in an induced coma. His condition was described as critical. According to a joint press release from the prosecutor's office and the police, the cause of the accident was hypoglycemia. On November 16, 2012, he was reported as no longer being in the coma.

It was not the first time that Vukčević being involved in a car accident due to hypoglycemia. On 18 October 2010, on the state road near Bad Rappenau his car collided with the trailer of a truck after hitting the guard rail several times. On 16 November, Vukcevic awoke from his coma and began communicating with his family.

In April 2014 he made his first public appearance after the car accident when he attended a home of fixture of his club against FC Augsburg. At this occasion he also expressed his desire to play football again. On 1 June 2014 although 1899 Hoffenheim released that his expiring contract wouldn't be extended. However the club would support him finding his way back to a normal life and promised him a new contract when he would be able to play football again.

He retired prematurely at the age of 24.
