= Christian Eichner =

German retired football defender

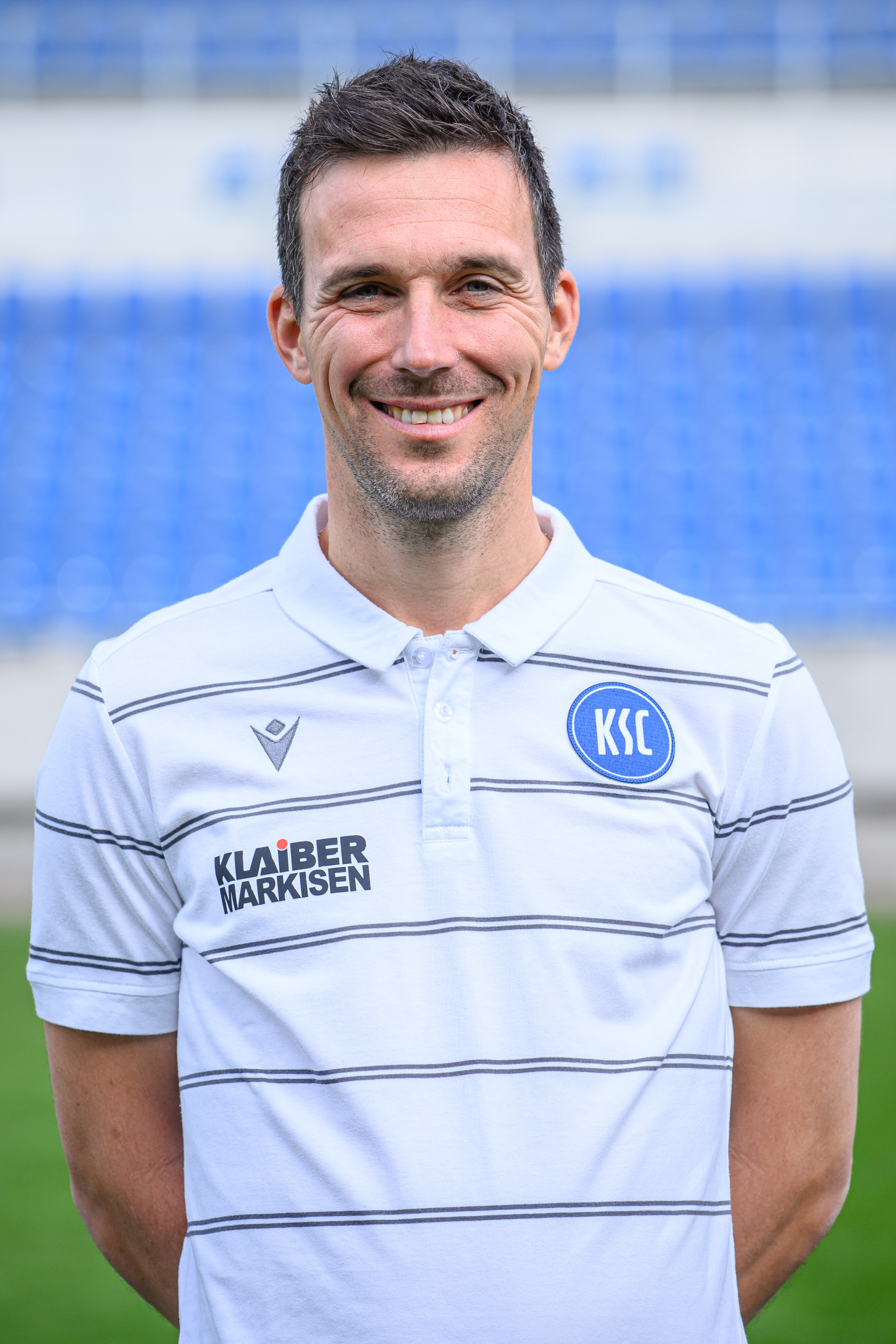
- Eichner with Karlsruher SC in 2020

Personal information
- Date of birth: 24 November 1982 (age 43)
- Place of birth: Sinsheim, West Germany
- Height: 1.83 m (6 ft 0 in)
- Position: Left back

Youth career
- 1986–1996: FVS Sulzfeld
- 1996–2005: Karlsruher SC

Senior career*
Years	Team	Apps	(Gls)
2005–2009	Karlsruher SC	128	(3)
2009–2010	1899 Hoffenheim	29	(1)
2011–2013	1. FC Köln	63	(0)
2014	MSV Duisburg	10	(0)
Total		230	(4)

Managerial career
- 2017: Karlsruher SC (caretaker)
- 2020–2026: Karlsruher SC
- * Club domestic league appearances and goals

Christian Eichner (born 24 November 1982) is a German professional football coach and former professional football player.

== Coaching record ==
As of match played 17 May 2026

Team	From	To	Record								Ref
Team	From	To	G	W	D	L	GF	GA	GD	Win %	Ref
Karlsruher SC (caretaker)	20 August 2017	28 August 2017	2	1	1	0	6	1	+5	50.00	
Karlsruher SC	3 February 2020	30 June 2026	230	86	68	76	387	348	+39	37.39	
Total			233	88	69	76	393	349	+44	37.77	—
