= Andreas Ibertsberger =

Austrian footballer (born 1982)

Personal information
- Date of birth: 27 July 1982 (age 44)
- Place of birth: Salzburg, Austria
- Height: 1.77 m (5 ft 10 in)
- Position: Left-back

Youth career
- 1989–1997: Seekirchen
- 1997–2000: BNZ Salzburg

Senior career*
Years	Team	Apps	(Gls)
2001–2005	Austria Salzburg	84	(3)
2005–2008	SC Freiburg	82	(1)
2008–2012	1899 Hoffenheim	83	(1)
2013	MSV Duisburg	7	(0)
Total		256	(5)

International career
2001	Austria U18	1	(0)
2002–2003	Austria U21	12	(0)
2004–2009	Austria	14	(1)

Managerial career
- 2014–2019: 1899 Hoffenheim II (assistant)
- 2019–2020: Eintracht Frankfurt (U19)
- 2020–2022: Eintracht Frankfurt (U19 assistant)
- * Club domestic league appearances and goals

Andreas Ibertsberger (born 27 July 1982) is an Austrian former professional footballer who played as a left-back. He was a member of the Austria national team. Ibertsberger is a younger brother of former national team player Robert Ibertsberger whose career was cut short by injury.

== Club career ==
Ibertsberger played for SC Freiburg, for whom he signed from Austria Salzburg in January 2005. In January 2008, he moved to 1899 Hoffenheim, with whom he originally signed a pre-contract agreement for the 2008–09 season. With smalltown club Hoffenheim he won promotion to the German Bundesliga.

On 15 May 2012, Ibertsberger's contract with Hoffenheim expired, after missing the vast majority of the 2011–12 season with a chronic back problem.

== International career ==
Ibertsberger made his debut for Austria in an October 2004 World Cup qualification match against Northern Ireland. He earned 14 caps, scoring one goal.

== Coaching career ==
Ahead of the 2014–15 season, Ibertsberger became the new assistant coach at TSG 1899 Hoffenheim's second team.

Ibertsberger was at Kiel until summer 2019, where he, ahead of the 2019–20 season, became U19 coach at Eintracht Frankfurt. They finished the season on a sixth place in the A-Junior Bundesliga South/Southwest. Ahead of the upcoming 2020–21 season, he instead became assistant coach of the same team under Jürgen Kramny. The duo left Eintracht at the end of the 2021/22 season.

== Career statistics ==
=== International ===
Appearances and goals by national team and year
National team	Year	Apps	Goals
Austria	2004	1	0
Austria	2005	5	1
Austria	2006	1	0
Austria	2007	5	0
Austria	2008	1	0
Austria	2009	1	0
Total		14	1

Scores and results list Austria's goal tally first, score column indicates score after each Ibertsberger goal.

List of international goals scored by Andreas Ibertsberger
No.	Date	Venue	Opponent	Score	Result	Competition
1	17 August 2005	Arnold Schwarzenegger Stadium, Graz, Austria	Scotland	1–2	2–2	Friendly
