= Kevin Conrad (footballer) =

German footballer

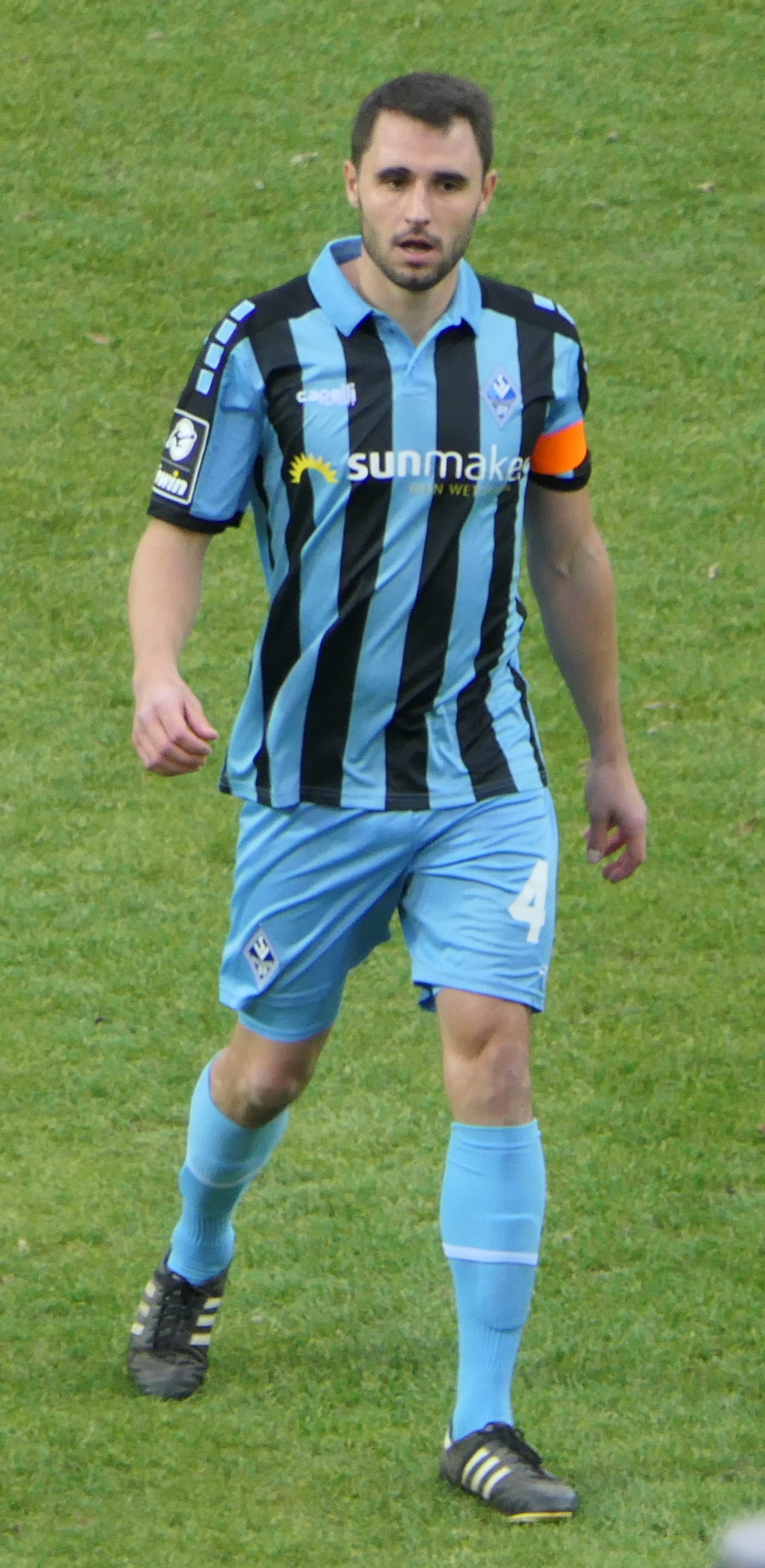
- Conrad with Waldhof Mannheim in 2019

Personal information
- Date of birth: 10 August 1990 (age 36)
- Place of birth: Künzelsau, West Germany
- Height: 1.81 m (5 ft 11 in)
- Position: Centre-back

Youth career
- –2003: TSV Hohebach
- 2003–2006: FV Lauda
- 2006–2009: 1899 Hoffenheim

Senior career*
Years	Team	Apps	(Gls)
2009–2013	1899 Hoffenheim II		
2009–2013	1899 Hoffenheim	0	(0)
2013–2017	Chemnitzer FC	118	(2)
2017–2020	Waldhof Mannheim	90	(5)
2020–2024	SV Elversberg	92	(3)
- * Club domestic league appearances and goals

Kevin Conrad (born 10 August 1990) is a German former professional footballer who played as a centre-back.
