= Isaac Vorsah =

Ghanaian footballer (born 1988)

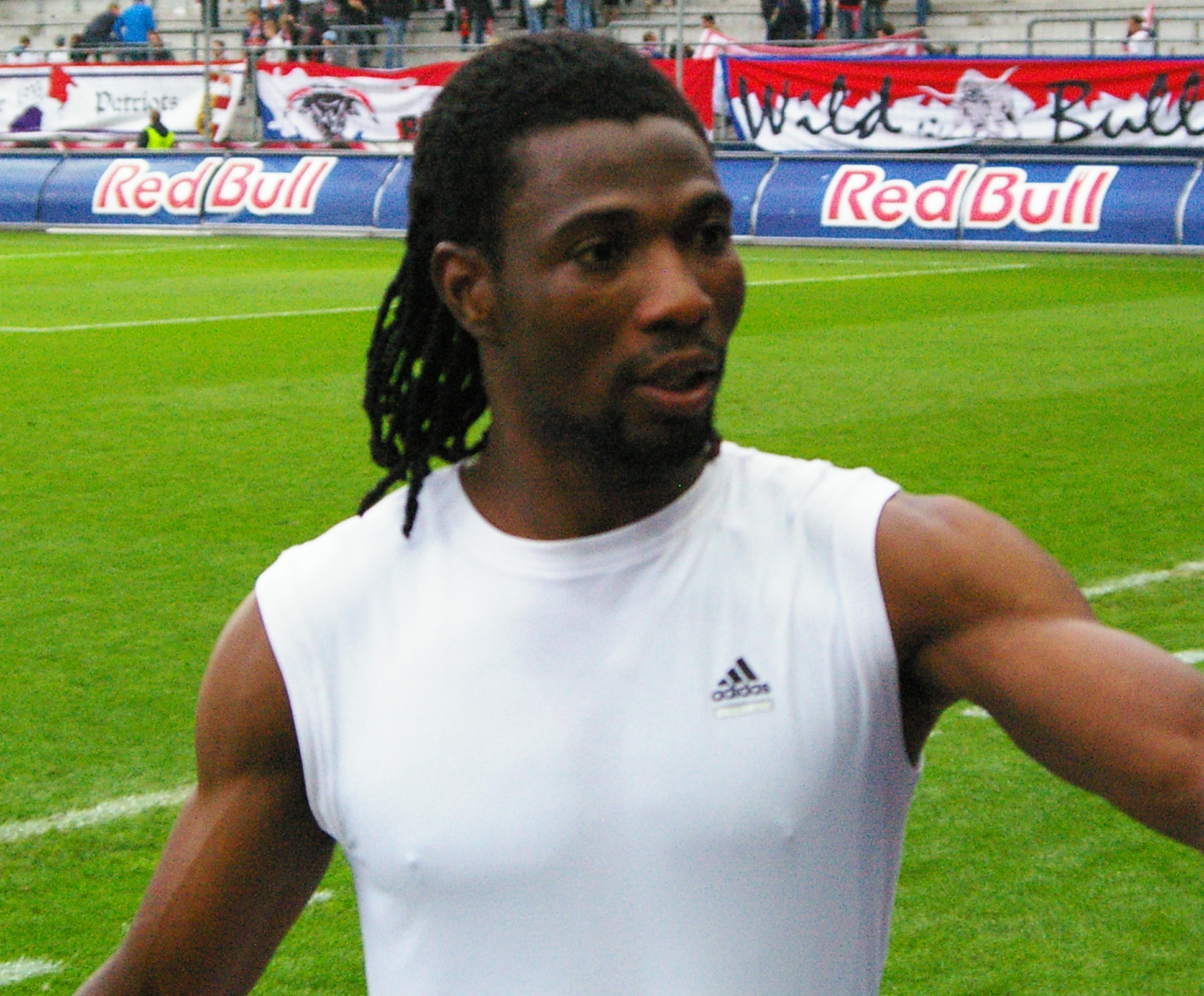
- 2012 with Red Bull Salzburg

Personal information
- Date of birth: 21 June 1988 (age 38)
- Place of birth: Accra, Greater Accra, Ghana
- Height: 1.96 m (6 ft 5 in)
- Position: Centre back

Youth career
- Oscar
- –2005: Maamobi

Senior career*
Years	Team	Apps	(Gls)
2005–2007	All Blacks		
2007	Asante Kotoko		
2007–2012	1899 Hoffenheim	110	(4)
2012–2015	Red Bull Salzburg	15	(1)
2015–2016	Liefering	4	(0)
2017	ASFAR	12	(0)
2017–2018	Ohod	18	(0)

International career^{‡}
2007–2013	Ghana	40	(1)
- * Club domestic league appearances and goals as of 23 January 2017 ‡ National team caps and goals as of 2 February 2013

Isaac Vorsah (born 21 June 1988) is a Ghanaian former footballer who played as a centre-back. Born in Accra, Vorsah started his career playing in his Kpando in the Volta Region later joining Gamba All Blacks F.C. in 2015. He secured a deal to Ghanaian giants Kumasi Asante Kotoko after his impressive performances. Vorsah joined TSG 1899 Hoffenheim on an initial loan deal in 2007, after impressing on a trail. He secured a permanent deal which resulted in him playing 130 matches and scored 4 goals in all competitions for TSG 1899 Hoffenheim over a span of 5 seasons from 2007 to 2012. He played for Ghana at four major international tournaments, including three African Cup of Nations (AFCON) in 2010, 2012, 2013 and at the 2010 World Cup in South Africa.

== Club career ==
=== Early career in Ghana ===
Vorsah's primary position is as a centre back, but he can also play as defensive midfielder. He began his career at Oscar FC in Kpando, Ghana and later moved to FC Maamobi. He transferred to Gamba All Blacks F.C. in 2005. In January 2007 the Kumasi based team Asante Kotoko bought Vorsah.

=== TSG 1899 Hoffenheim ===
After six month with Asante Kotoko, German side TSG 1899 Hoffenheim offered him a trial. After the trial he was loaned until 30 June 2008. He satisfied the management and on 1 April 2008 TSG 1899 Hoffenheim used their option to buy him and he signed a contract until 30 June 2011. Vorsah left the club in 2012, after playing 110 league matches and scoring 4 goals between 2007 and 2012.

=== Red Bull Salzburg ===
Vorsah moved to Red Bull Salzburg in August 2012. In 2015 Vorsah joined the farm team FC Liefering. In 2016, he left Liefering.

=== ASFAR ===
After parting ways with Red Bull Salzburg and FC Liefering, in January 2017, Vorsah signed a two-year contract with Moroccan side ASFAR until 2019. He joined the club on a free transfer.

=== Al Ohod ===
Vorsah signed for Saudi Arabian side Al Ohod club. He signed a one-year contract with the Madina-based club. Before signing for Al Ohod, there were reports of him urging towards a deal with Norwegian side Sogndal and Danish side AC Horsens. In the first week of February 2018, he was named in the team of the week in the Saudi Professional League following a stupendous display for Ohod.

== International career ==
He made his national team debut against Senegal on 21 August 2007 after he had formerly represented his homeland at U-23 level. He was part of Ghana's Olympic team, the Black Meteors. He was named in Ghana's 23-man squad for the 2010 FIFA World Cup and played in the opener before an injury kept him out of the following matches, but he returned from injury in time to play Ghana's final match of the tournament, the quarter-final.

== Career statistics ==
=== Club ===
As of match played on 5 May 2012.

Club	Season	Ghana Premier League		Ghanaian FA Cup		CAF Champions League		Ghana Super Cup		CAF Confederation Cup		Other^{1}		Total	
Club	Season	Apps	Goals	Apps	Goals	Apps	Goals	Apps	Goals	Apps	Goals	Apps	Goals	Apps	Goals
All Blacks	2005–2006	0	0	0	0	0	0	0	0	0	0	0	0	0	0
All Blacks	2006–2007	0	0	0	0	0	0	0	0	0	0	0	0	0	0
Total		0	0	0	0	0	0	0	0	0	0	0	0	0	0
Club	Season	Apps	Goals	Apps	Goals	Apps	Goals	Apps	Goals	Apps	Goals	Apps	Goals	Apps	Goals
Asante	2006–2007	0	0	0	0	0	0	0	0	0	0	0	0	0	0
Total		0	0	0	0	0	0	0	0	0	0	0	0	0	0
Club	Season	2. Bundesliga		DFB-Pokal		DFL-Supercup		UEFA Europa League				Other^{1}		Total	
Club	Season	Apps	Goals	Apps	Goals	Apps	Goals	Apps		Goals		Apps	Goals	Apps	Goals
Hoffenheim	2007–2008	17	1	0	0	0	0	0		0		0	0	17	1
Hoffenheim	Total	17	1	0	0	0	0	0		0		0	0	17	1
Hoffenheim	Season	Bundesliga		DFB-Pokal		UEFA Champions League		DFL-Supercup		UEFA Europa League		Other^{1}		Total	
Hoffenheim	Season	Apps	Goals	Apps	Goals	Apps	Goals	Apps	Goals	Apps	Goals	Apps	Goals	Apps	Goals
Hoffenheim	2008–2009	26	0	0	0	0	0	0	0	0	0	0	0	26	0
Hoffenheim	2009–2010	16	0	3	0	0	0	0	0	0	0	0	0	19	0
Hoffenheim	2010–2011	30	3	3	0	0	0	0	0	0	0	0	0	33	3
Hoffenheim	2011–2012	21	0	2	0	0	0	0	0	0	0	0	0	23	0
Total		105	3	8	0	0	0	0	0	0	0	0	0	113	3

^{1}Includes other competitive competitions.

=== International ===
As of match played on 2 February 2013.

National team	Year	Apps	Goals
Ghana	2009	8	0
Ghana	2010	10	0
Ghana	2011	11	1
Ghana	2012	8	0
Ghana	2013	5	0
Total		40	1

=== International goals ===
Scores and results list Ghana's goal tally first.

#	Date	Venue	Opponent	Score	Result	Competition
1	3 June 2011	Baba Yara Stadium, Kumasi, Ghana	Congo	1–0	3–1 (Win)	2012 CAF Qualifying

== Honours ==
=== Club ===
Red Bull Salzburg

- Austrian Bundesliga: 2013–14, 2014–15
- Austrian Cup: 2013–14

=== International ===
Ghana

- Africa Cup of Nations runner-up: 2010

=== Individual ===
- Ghana Defender of the Year: 2007
