= TSG 1899 Hoffenheim =

German association football club

TSG Hoffenheim
- Full name: Turn- und Sportgemeinschaft; 1899 Hoffenheim e.V.
- Nickname: Die Kraichgauer (The Kraichgauers)
- Founded: 1 July 1899; 127 years ago
- Stadium: SNP Arena
- Capacity: 30,150
- Owner: Dietmar Hopp (96%)
- Board: André Kreuzwieser (First Chairman); Florian Beil (Second Chairman); Frank Engelhardt (Third Chairman)
- Head coach: Christian Ilzer
- League: Bundesliga
- 2025–26: Bundesliga, 5th of 18
- Website: tsg-hoffenheim.de
| Home colours | Away colours | Third colours |

Turn- und Sportgemeinschaft 1899 Hoffenheim e.V. (pronounced [ˈtʊʁn ʔʊnt ˈʃpɔʁtɡəˌmaɪnʃaft ˌʔaxtseːnˈhʊndɐt ˌnɔʏnʔʊntˈnɔʏntsɪç ˈhɔfn̩haɪm]), commonly known as TSG Hoffenheim (pronounced [ˌteːʔɛsˈɡeː ˈhɔfn̩haɪm]), are a German professional football club based in Sinsheim.

Originally founded in 1899 as a gymnastics club, Hoffenheim came into being in their modern form in 1945. A fifth division side in 2000, the club rapidly advanced through the German football league system with the financial backing of alumnus and software mogul Dietmar Hopp, and in 2008 Hoffenheim was promoted to the top tier Bundesliga. Despite never winning a major trophy, they have experienced success. In the 2017–18 season, Hoffenheim finished third in the Bundesliga (their best to date), qualifying for the UEFA Champions League group stage for the first time.

Since 2009, Hoffenheim have played their home games at the Rhein-Neckar-Arena (known as PreZero Arena for sponsorship reasons), having previously played at the Dietmar-Hopp-Stadion from 1999.

== History ==
The modern-day club was formed in 1945, when gymnastics club Turnverein Hoffenheim (founded 1 July 1899) and football club Fußballverein Hoffenheim (founded 1921) merged. At the beginning of the 1990s, the club was a local amateur side playing in the eighth division Baden-Württemberg A-Liga. They steadily improved and by 1996 were competing in the Verbandsliga Nordbaden (V).

Around 2000, alumnus Dietmar Hopp returned to the club of his youth as a financial backer. Hopp was the co-founder of software firm SAP and he put some of his money into the club. His contributions generated almost immediate results: in 2000 Hoffenheim finished first in the Verbandsliga and was promoted to the fourth-tier Oberliga Baden-Württemberg. Another first-place finish moved the club up to the Regionalliga Süd (III) for the 2001–02 season. They finished 13th in their first season in the Regionalliga, but improved significantly the next year, earning a fifth-place result.

Hoffenheim earned fifth and seventh-place finishes in the next two seasons, before improving to fourth in 2005–06 to earn their best result to date. The club made its first DFB-Pokal appearance in the 2003–04 competition and performed well, advancing to the quarter-finals by eliminating 2. Bundesliga sides Eintracht Trier and Karlsruher SC and Bundesliga club Bayer Leverkusen before being put out themselves by another 2. Bundesliga side, VfB Lübeck.

Negotiations to merge TSG Hoffenheim, Astoria Walldorf, and SV Sandhausen to create FC Heidelberg 06 in 2005 were abandoned due to the resistance of the latter two clubs, and the failure to agree on whether the new side's stadium should be located in Heidelberg or Eppelheim. Team owner Hopp preferred Heidelberg, but could not overcome the resistance of local firm Wild, which had already reserved the site of the planned stadium for its new production facilities.

=== 2006–2008: Major investments, promotion to the Bundesliga ===
In 2006, the club sought to improve its squad and technical staff by bringing in players with several years of Bundesliga experience, most notably Jochen Seitz and Tomislav Marić, and young talents like Sejad Salihović, while signing manager Ralf Rangnick, who managed Bundesliga teams such as SSV Ulm 1846, VfB Stuttgart, Hannover 96 and Schalke 04, to a five-year contract. The investment paid off in the 2006–07 season with the club's promotion to the 2. Bundesliga after finishing second in Regionalliga Süd.

The 2007–08 season was Hoffenheim's first season in professional football. After a weak start with three losses and only one draw in the first four games, the team's performance improved remarkably and Hoffenheim climbed from 16th place on matchday four to second place on matchday 23. The team defended their place until the end of the season, having scored 60 points after matchday 34. As a result of their second-place finish, they received automatic promotion to the Bundesliga, the highest tier in German football, after playing in the 2. Bundesliga for just one season.

=== 2008–present: Growth of the club and Champions League football ===
Hoffenheim recorded a 7th-place finish in their debut season in the Bundesliga, Germany's top division. The club's best players of the season were Vedad Ibišević and Demba Ba, who scored 18 and 14 goals respectively. In the 2009–10 Bundesliga, the club had a less successful season, recording a finish outside of the top 10, finishing 11th. The club finished in consecutive 11th places for the next two seasons. In the 2012–13 Bundesliga, the club came very close to suffering relegation, after a 16th-place finish, meaning they would have to play in the relegation play-offs to survive; the club went on to beat their opponents Kaiserslautern by a scoreline of 5–2 on aggregate over two legs, with Roberto Firmino scoring two goals in the first leg. In the 2013–14 Bundesliga, the club had strange statistics; being the third best goalscoring team in the league, but also the worst defensive team, scoring 72 goals and conceding 70. The club's best goalscorer of the season, also their best assist provider, was Roberto Firmino, scoring 16 goals and providing 12 assists, with the player winning the Bundesliga Breakthrough Player of the Season award. In the 2014–15 Bundesliga, the club came very close to qualifying for the Europa League, with just two points separating them from Borussia Dortmund, who were in 7th place. Despite the 8th-place finish, Hoffenheim still had a goal difference of −6 in the 2014–15 season. In the 2015–16 Bundesliga, the club once again came close to suffering relegation, with just one point separating them from the relegation play-offs.

In the 2016–17 season, new coach Julian Nagelsmann took over, beginning to recruit several new players, including Andrej Kramarić, Kerem Demirbay and Sandro Wagner. Initially, the club struggled for form, with four draws in the first four games of the season, before a rise in form rose the club to 3rd place in the league by the end of October. On 4 April 2017, the club beat Bayern Munich by a scoreline of 1–0, one of the most significant wins in the club's history. On 21 April 2017, the club confirmed that they would play European football next season following a 1–1 draw with Köln. Following a 4th-place finish in the 2016–17 Bundesliga, Hoffenheim qualified for the 2017–18 UEFA Champions League. The club were drawn to play six-time European champions Liverpool in the play-off round. The club lost the first leg by a scoreline of 1–2, before a 4–2 loss in the second leg confirmed Hoffenheim's elimination from the tournament, as the club lost 3–6 on aggregate. Due to their elimination from the play-off stages, the club would continue playing European football in the Europa League group stages; however, the club were eliminated from the tournament as they would finish bottom in the group stage.

In the 2017–18 Bundesliga season, Hoffenheim had a successful season, finishing third, automatically qualifying for the next year's Champions League. The 2018–19 season was disappointing for Hoffenheim, as they finished bottom of their Champions League group with only 3 draws and 3 losses whilst playing Manchester City, Lyon and Shakhtar Donetsk. In the Bundesliga, Hoffenheim finished in 9th place. The season's top scorer was Andre Kramarić, with the Croatian netting 22 times in 37 appearances. Nagelsmann left the club to join RB Leipzig at the end of the season. Alfred Schreuder, former assistant coach under Huub Stevens and Julian Nagelsmann was appointed as the new head coach. After one year Sebastian Hoeneß became the new head coach, but he was released in May 2022. André Breitenreiter took over as coach until February 2023 and was followed by Pellegrino Matarazzo, who was dismissed in November 2024.

== Players ==
=== Current squad ===
As of 1 September 2026

Note: Flags indicate national team as defined under FIFA eligibility rules; some limited exceptions apply. Players may hold more than one non-FIFA nationality.

| No. | Pos. | Nation | Player |
|---|---|---|---|
| 1 | GK | GER | Oliver Baumann (captain) |
| 2 | DF | CZE | Robin Hranáč |
| 4 | DF | GER | Sean Dulic |
| 5 | DF | TUR | Ozan Kabak |
| 7 | MF | KOS | Leon Avdullahu |
| 8 | MF | AUT | Patrick Wimmer |
| 9 | FW | GER | Max Moerstedt |
| 10 | FW | CZE | Adam Hložek |
| 11 | FW | KOS | Fisnik Asllani |
| 13 | DF | BRA | Bernardo |
| 14 | FW | DEN | Adam Daghim |
| 15 | DF | FRA | Valentin Gendrey |
| 16 | MF | GER | Luis Engelns |
| 17 | MF | BEL | Nathan De Cat |

| No. | Pos. | Nation | Player |
|---|---|---|---|
| 18 | MF | NED | Wouter Burger |
| 19 | FW | GER | Tim Lemperle |
| 20 | MF | GER | Bambasé Conté |
| 21 | DF | KOS | Albian Hajdari |
| 22 | MF | AUT | Alexander Prass |
| 27 | FW | CRO | Andrej Kramarić |
| 28 | DF | JPN | Kōki Machida |
| 29 | DF | GER | Natnael Abraha |
| 32 | MF | GER | Cajetan Lenz |
| 34 | DF | CZE | Vladimír Coufal |
| 36 | GK | ISL | Lúkas Petersson |
| 37 | GK | GER | Luca Philipp |
| 39 | DF | NED | Mats Rots |

=== Players out on loan ===
Note: Flags indicate national team as defined under FIFA eligibility rules; some limited exceptions apply. Players may hold more than one non-FIFA nationality.

| No. | Pos. | Nation | Player |
|---|---|---|---|
| — | GK | GER | Nahuel Noll (at SC Paderborn until 30 June 2027) |
| — | DF | BRA | Arthur Chaves (at Botafogo until 31 December 2027) |
| — | DF | NGR | Emmanuel Chukwu (at Austria Lustenau until 30 June 2027) |
| — | DF | GER | Kelven Frees (at 1. FC Kaiserslautern until 30 June 2027) |
| — | MF | GER | Umut Tohumcu (at Red Bull Salzburg until 30 June 2027) |
| — | FW | NGR | Precious Benjamin (at Austria Lustenau until 30 June 2027) |

| No. | Pos. | Nation | Player |
|---|---|---|---|
| — | FW | CZE | Yannick Eduardo (at ADO Den Haag until 30 June 2027) |
| — | FW | NGR | Gift Orban (at Amedspor until 30 June 2027) |
| — | FW | SUI | Alessandro Vogt (at 1. FC Heidenheim until 30 June 2027) |
| — | FW | TUR | Erencan Yardımcı (at 1. FC Kaiserslautern until 30 June 2027) |
| — | FW | GER | Deniz Zeitler ( at SC Paderborn until 30 June 2027) |

=== Former players ===
- (United States) Russell Canouse

== Coaching staff ==
| Position | Staff |
|---|---|
| Head coach | (Austria) Christian Ilzer |
| Assistant coach | (Austria) Dominik Deutschl (Austria) Uwe Hölzl (Germany) Moritz Volz |
| Goalkeeping coach | (Germany) Marjan Petković |
| Athletics coach | (Germany) Philipp Lussi (Germany) Martin Seiler (Germany) Markus Zidek |
| Injury prevention specialist | (Germany) Christian Neitzert |
| Team manager | (Germany) Christoph Kraatz (Germany) Daniel Uthmann |
| Head of football intelligence | (Germany) Timo Gross |
| Head of performance | (Austria) Marco Angeler |
| Analyst | (Germany) Matthias Güldner (Germany) Tim Knobel (Germany) Niklas Hagenhoff |
| Team doctor | (Germany) Dr. Ralph Kern (Germany) Dr. Yannic Bangert |
| Head of physiotherapy | (Germany) Peter Geigle |
| Physiotherapist | (Germany) Martin Beer (Germany) Yaşar Besohé (Germany) Sören Johannsen |
| Kit manager and general assistant | (Germany) Christian Seyfert (Germany) Heinz Seyfert (Germany) Timo Seyfert |
| General assistant | (Germany) Matthias Bauer |

== Stadium ==
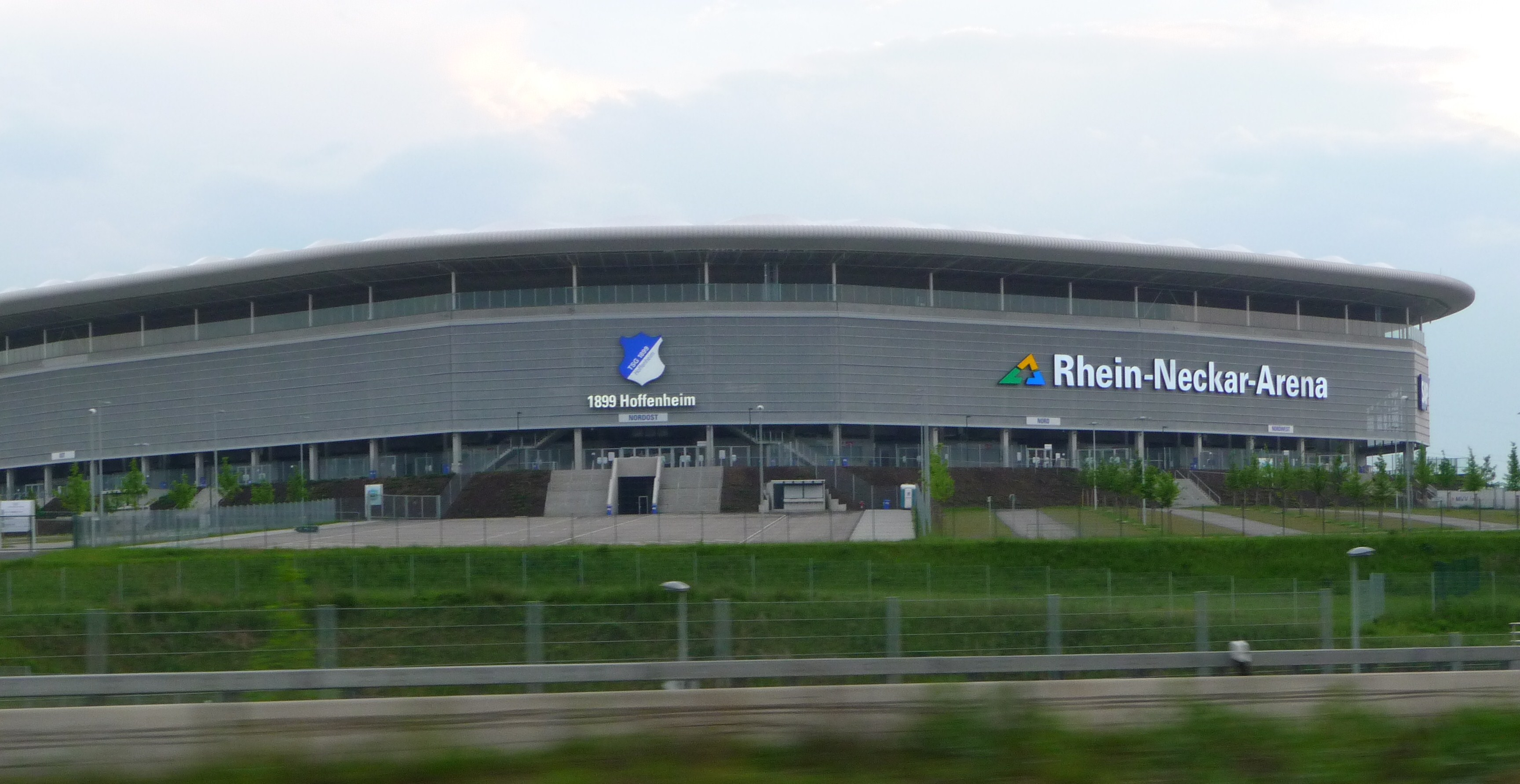
PreZero Rhein-Neckar-Arena, the senior team's current stadium.

Before being promoted to the Bundesliga in 2008, the club played in the Dietmar-Hopp-Stadion, which was built in 1999 with a capacity of 5,000 (1,620 seats).

TSG 1899 Hoffenheim made their ambitions clear in 2006, when the club's management decided to begin building the new 30,150 seat Rhein-Neckar-Arena. The stadium was originally to be built in Heidelberg before the selection of a site in Sinsheim.

They opened their first season in the Bundesliga at the 26,022 capacity Carl-Benz-Stadion in Mannheim, and played their first match in their new stadium on 31 January 2009.

== Controversy ==
=== Criticism of the club ===
Dietmar Hopp's financial support, which transformed Hoffenheim from a local amateur club into a competitive Bundesliga club, has been strongly criticised by other clubs, fans and some in the German press. The main points of criticism are the club's purported lack of tradition and a historically large fanbase, as the club is a historically insignificant side from a village of just 3,300 inhabitants. This situation is similar to that of now-defunct Scottish side Gretna and German clubs VfL Wolfsburg, Bayer Leverkusen and RB Leipzig, as those teams also received large financial support; Wolfsburg is wholly owned and supported by automobile manufacturer Volkswagen, Bayer Leverkusen by pharmaceutical company Bayer and RB Leipzig by Red Bull.

On 16 August 2011, the club released a statement regarding complaints of a loudspeaker that was strategically placed under away fans during a home game against Dortmund. The loudspeaker was designed to drown out the noise of the away fans cheers and chants during the game. It was reported that the speaker was placed by the groundskeeper, although the club denied any involvement, saying he acted alone. It was also reported that the loudspeaker was used during other games, not just the home game against Dortmund.

In a later statement, the club admitted that the disruptive sound assembly has been used at least five times, although club officials claim to have no knowledge of these measures.

On 29 February 2020, Bayern Munich supporters unfurled an offensive banner aimed at Hoffenheim owner Dietmar Hopp, resulting in the match being suspended with less than 15 minutes left to play. After concerns that the game could be abandoned, both teams returned to finish the match, but had decided to just run down the clock to end the game in solidarity with Hopp. Rather than play on, the two teams began passing the ball between each other and chatting as if they were all teammates.

The very next day, the Bundesliga match between Vfl Wolfsburg and 1. FC Union Berlin was stopped at the 44th minute of play due to derogatory banners once again being unfurled, one of which showed Hopp under crosshairs. The two teams left the field and returned 10 minutes later to play out the remainder of the 1st half and subsequently the game.

== Partnership ==
On 25 September 2020, TSG 1899 Hoffenheim signed a partnership agreement with MLS club FC Cincinnati. Hoffenheim also have a partnership agreement with a Ghana Premier League side Accra Hearts Of Oak, making it a three club value alliance on 20 September 2020.

In March 2025, the club entered into a strategic partnership with Indian I-League club Rajasthan United.

== Honours ==
The club's honours:

=== League ===
- 2. Bundesliga
  - Runners-up: 2007–08
- Regionalliga
  - Runners-up: 2006–07
- Oberliga Baden-Württemberg (IV)
  - Champions: 2000–01
  - Runners-up: 2009–10^{‡}
- Verbandsliga Nordbaden (V)
  - Champions: 1999–2000
  - Runners-up: 2002–03^{‡}

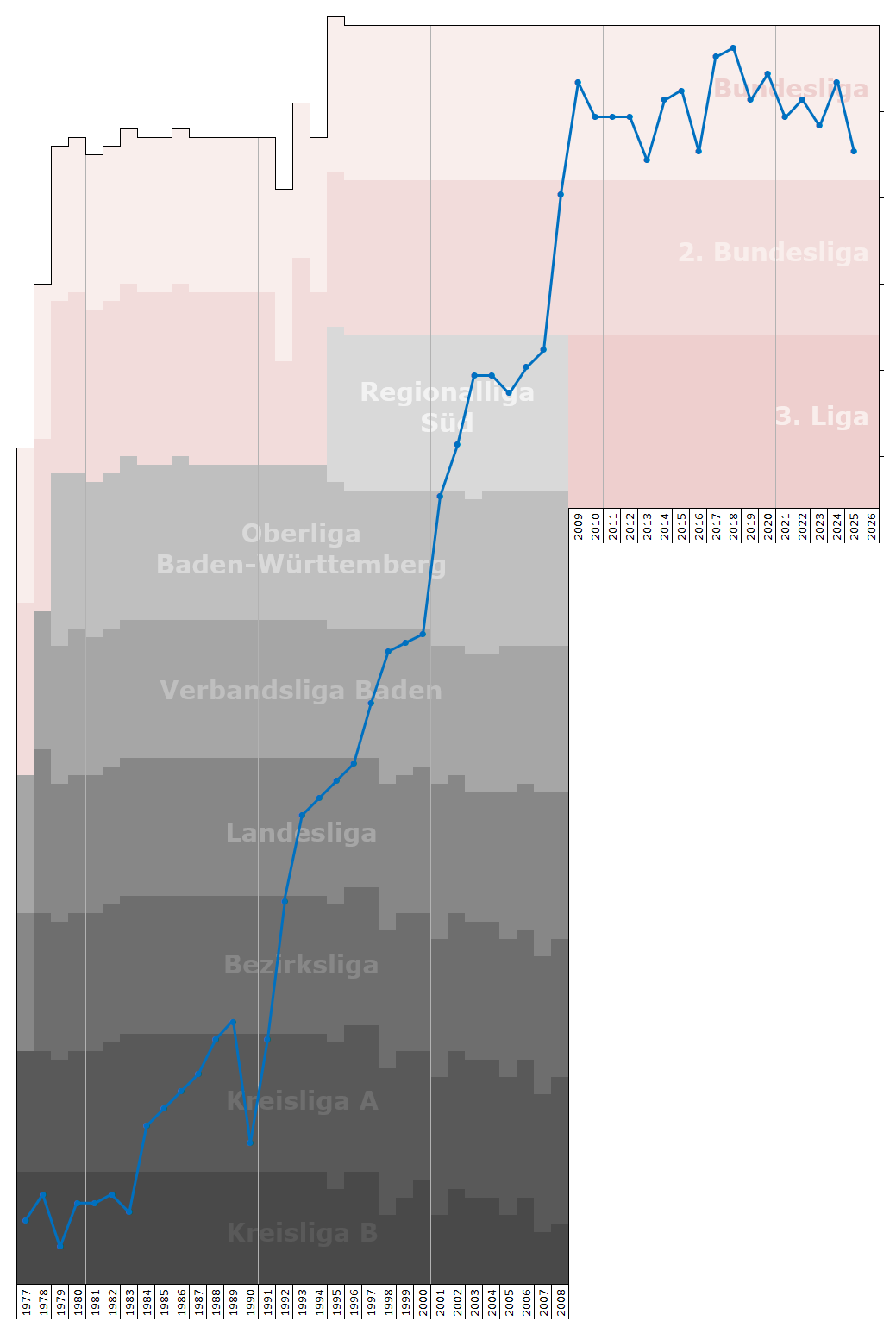
Historical chart of 1899 Hoffenheim league performance

=== Cup ===
- North Baden Cup (Tiers III–VII)
  - Winners: 2001–02, 2002–03, 2003–04, 2004–05
  - Runners-up: 2006–07

=== Youth ===
- German Under 19 championship
  - Champions: 2013–14
  - Runners-up: 2014–15, 2015–16
- German Under 17 championship
  - Champions: 2007–08
- Under 19 Bundesliga South/Southwest
  - Champions: 2013–14, 2014–15, 2015–16
- Under 17 Bundesliga South/Southwest
  - Champions: 2007–08
  - Runners-up: 2010–11
- Under 15 Regionalliga Süd
  - Champions: 2011–12, 2012–13, 2015–16
- ^{‡} Won by reserve team.

== Coaching history ==
Recent coaches of the club:

| Start | End | Coach |
|---|---|---|
| 1979 | 1982 | (Germany) Helmut Zuber |
| 1982 | | (Germany) Meinard Stadelbauer |
| 1982 | 1984 | (Germany) Rudi Ebel |
| 1984 | 1985 | (Germany) Klaus Keller |
| 1986 | 1989 | (Germany) Helmut Jedele |
| 1989 | 1990 | (Germany) Gerhard Boll |
| 1990 | 1992 | (Germany) Egon Ludwig |
| 1992 | 1994 | (Germany) Hans Schreiner |
| 1994 | 1998 | (Germany) Roland Schmitt |
| 1998 | | (Germany) Alfred Schön |
| 1998 | 14 March 1999 | (Germany) Raimund Lietzau |
| 15 March 1999 | 30 September 1999 | (Germany) Günter Hillenbrand |
| 31 August 1999 | 12 March 2000 | (Germany) Riko Weigand |
| 2000 | 30 June 2000 | (Germany) Alfred Schön |
| 1 July 2000 | 19 November 2005 | (Germany) Hansi Flick |
| 19 November 2005 | 23 December 2005 | (Germany) Roland Dickgießer* |
| 10 January 2006 | 21 May 2006 | (Germany) Lorenz-Günther Köstner |
| 24 May 2006 | 30 June 2006 | (Germany) Alfred Schön* |
| 1 July 2006 | 1 January 2011 | (Germany) Ralf Rangnick |
| 2 January 2011 | 30 June 2011 | (Germany) Marco Pezzaiuoli |
| 1 July 2011 | 9 February 2012 | (Germany) Holger Stanislawski |
| 10 February 2012 | 3 December 2012 | (Germany) Markus Babbel |
| 3 December 2012 | 31 December 2012 | (Germany) Frank Kramer* |
| 1 January 2013 | 2 April 2013 | (Germany) Marco Kurz |
| 2 April 2013 | 26 October 2015 | (Germany) Markus Gisdol |
| 26 October 2015 | 10 February 2016 | (Netherlands) Huub Stevens |
| 11 February 2016 | 30 June 2019 | (Germany) Julian Nagelsmann |
| 1 July 2019 | 9 June 2020 | (Netherlands) Alfred Schreuder |
| 10 June 2020 | 26 July 2020 | (Germany) Matthias Kaltenbach* |
| 27 July 2020 | 17 May 2022 | (Germany) Sebastian Hoeneß |
| 24 May 2022 | 6 February 2023 | (Germany) André Breitenreiter |
| 8 February 2023 | 11 November 2024 | (United States) Pellegrino Matarazzo |

*As caretaker coach.

== Recent seasons ==
The recent season-by-season performance of the club:

| Season | Division | Tier | Position |
|---|---|---|---|
| 1977–78 | B-Klasse Nord | IX | 3rd |
| 1978–79 | Kreisliga B Nord | IX | 9th |
| 1979–80 | Kreisliga B Nord | IX | 4th |
| 1980–81 | Kreisliga B Nord | IX | 4th |
| 1981–82 | Kreisliga B Nord | IX | 3rd |
| 1982–83 | Kreisliga B Nord | IX | 5th↑ |
| 1983–84 | Kreisliga A | VIII | 11th |
| 1984–85 | Kreisliga A | VIII | 9th |
| 1985–86 | Kreisliga A | VIII | 7th |
| 1986–87 | Kreisliga A | VIII | 5th |
| 1987–88 | Kreisliga A | VIII | 1st↑ |
| 1988–89 | Bezirksliga Sinsheim | VII | 15th↓ |
| 1989–90 | Kreisliga A | VIII | 13th |
| 1990–91 | Kreisliga A | VIII | 1st↑ |
| 1991–92 | Bezirksliga Sinsheim | VII | 1st↑ |
| 1992–93 | Landesliga Rhein-Neckar | VI | 7th |
| 1993–94 | Landesliga Rhein-Neckar | VI | 5th |
| 1994–95 | Landesliga Rhein-Neckar | VI | 3rd |
| 1995–96 | Landesliga Rhein-Neckar | VI | 1st↑ |
| 1996–97 | Verbandsliga Nordbaden | V | 9th |
| 1997–98 | Verbandsliga Nordbaden | V | 3rd |
| 1998–99 | Verbandsliga Nordbaden | V | 2nd |
| 1999–2000 | Verbandsliga Nordbaden | V | 1st↑ |
| 2000–01 | Oberliga Baden-Württemberg | IV | 1st↑ |
| 2001–02 | Regionalliga Süd | III | 13th |
| 2002–03 | Regionalliga Süd | III | 5th |
| 2003–04 | Regionalliga Süd | III | 5th |
| 2004–05 | Regionalliga Süd | III | 7th |
| 2005–06 | Regionalliga Süd | III | 4th |
| 2006–07 | Regionalliga Süd | III | 2nd↑ |
| 2007–08 | 2. Bundesliga | II | 2nd↑ |
| 2008–09 | Bundesliga | I | 7th |
| 2009–10 | Bundesliga | I | 11th |
| 2010–11 | Bundesliga | I | 11th |
| 2011–12 | Bundesliga | I | 11th |
| 2012–13 | Bundesliga | I | 16th |
| 2013–14 | Bundesliga | I | 9th |
| 2014–15 | Bundesliga | I | 8th |
| 2015–16 | Bundesliga | I | 15th |
| 2016–17 | Bundesliga | I | 4th |
| 2017–18 | Bundesliga | I | 3rd |
| 2018–19 | Bundesliga | I | 9th |
| 2019–20 | Bundesliga | I | 6th |
| 2020–21 | Bundesliga | I | 11th |
| 2021–22 | Bundesliga | I | 9th |
| 2022–23 | Bundesliga | I | 12th |
| 2023–24 | Bundesliga | I | 7th |
| 2024–25 | Bundesliga | I | 15th |
| 2025–26 | Bundesliga | I | 5th |
| 2026–27 | Bundesliga | I | TBD |

Key

| ↑ Promoted | ↓ Relegated |

- With the introduction of the Regionalligas in 1994 and the 3. Liga in 2008 as the new third tier, below the 2. Bundesliga, all leagues below dropped one tier. In 2012, the number of Regionalligas was increased from three to five with all Regionalliga Süd clubs except the Bavarian ones entering the new Regionalliga Südwest.

== European record ==
Hoffenheim made their debut in European competition in 2017, qualifying for the play-off round of the 2017–18 UEFA Champions League play-offs. Their first match was on 15 August 2017, losing the first leg of the play-offs 2–1 to Liverpool.

=== Matches ===
| Season | Competition | Round | Club | Home | Away | Result |
|---|---|---|---|---|---|---|
| 2017–18 | UEFA Champions League | PO | (England) Liverpool | 1–2 | 2–4 | 3–6 |
| 2017–18 | UEFA Europa League | GS | (Portugal) Braga | 1–2 | 1–3 | 4th |
| 2017–18 | UEFA Europa League | GS | (Bulgaria) Ludogorets Razgrad | 1–1 | 1–2 | 4th |
| 2017–18 | UEFA Europa League | GS | (Turkey) İstanbul Başakşehir | 3–1 | 1–1 | 4th |
| 2018–19 | UEFA Champions League | GS | (Ukraine) Shakhtar Donetsk | 2–3 | 2–2 | 4th |
| 2018–19 | UEFA Champions League | GS | (England) Manchester City | 1–2 | 1–2 | 4th |
| 2018–19 | UEFA Champions League | GS | (France) Lyon | 3–3 | 2–2 | 4th |
| 2020–21 | UEFA Europa League | GS | (Belgium) Gent | 4–1 | 4–1 | 1st |
| 2020–21 | UEFA Europa League | GS | (Serbia) Red Star Belgrade | 2–0 | 0–0 | 1st |
| 2020–21 | UEFA Europa League | GS | (Czech Republic) Slovan Liberec | 5–0 | 2–0 | 1st |
| 2020–21 | UEFA Europa League | R32 | (Norway) Molde | 0–2 | 3–3 | 3–5 |
| 2024–25 | UEFA Europa League | LP | (Denmark) Midtjylland | —N/a | 1–1 | 27th |
| 2024–25 | UEFA Europa League | LP | (Ukraine) Dynamo Kyiv | 2–0 | —N/a | 27th |
| 2024–25 | UEFA Europa League | LP | (Portugal) Porto | —N/a | 0–2 | 27th |
| 2024–25 | UEFA Europa League | LP | (France) Lyon | 2–2 | —N/a | 27th |
| 2024–25 | UEFA Europa League | LP | (Portugal) Braga | —N/a | 0–3 | 27th |
| 2024–25 | UEFA Europa League | LP | (Romania) FCSB | 0–0 | —N/a | 27th |
| 2024–25 | UEFA Europa League | LP | (England) Tottenham Hotspur | 2–3 | —N/a | 27th |
| 2024–25 | UEFA Europa League | LP | (Belgium) Anderlecht | —N/a | 4–3 | 27th |
| 2026–27 | UEFA Europa League | LP | (Greece) OFI | —N/a | 0–2 | |
| 2026–27 | UEFA Europa League | LP | (Turkey) Beşiktaş | 2–3 | —N/a | |
| 2026–27 | UEFA Europa League | LP | (France) Lyon | 3–0 | —N/a | |
| 2026–27 | UEFA Europa League | LP | (England) Crystal Palace | —N/a | | |
| 2026–27 | UEFA Europa League | LP | (Austria) Sturm Graz | | —N/a | |
| 2026–27 | UEFA Europa League | LP | (Belgium) Anderlecht | —N/a | | |
| 2026–27 | UEFA Europa League | LP | (Greece) Olympiacos | —N/a | | |
| 2026–27 | UEFA Europa League | LP | (Hungary) Ferencváros | | —N/a | |

=== UEFA club coefficient ranking ===
As of 1 May 2026

| Rank | Club | Points |
|---|---|---|
| 110 | (Germany) Mainz 05 | 18.466 |
| 111 | (Germany) 1. FC Heidenheim | 18.466 |
| 112 | (Germany) TSG Hoffenheim | 18.466 |
| 113 | (Germany) 1. FC Köln | 18.466 |
| 114 | (Germany) VfL Wolfsburg | 18.466 |

== Goalscoring and appearance records ==
As of 23 March 2026

**Most appearances for the club**

| Rank | Player | Career | Appearances |
|---|---|---|---|
| 1 | (Germany) **Oliver Baumann** | 2014–present | 432 |
| 2 | (Croatia) **Andrej Kramarić** | 2016–present | 354 |
| 3 | (Germany) Sebastian Rudy | 2010–2017; 2019–2023 | 327 |
| 4 | (Czech Republic) Pavel Kadeřábek | 2015–2025 | 286 |
| – | (Bosnia and Herzegovina) Sejad Salihović | 2006–2015 | 249 |
| 6 | (Germany) Andreas Beck | 2008–2015 | 237 |
| 7 | (Germany) Kevin Vogt | 2016–2024 | 226 |
| 8 | (Germany) Marcel Throm | 2000–2008 | 205 |
| 9 | (Nigeria) **Kevin Akpoguma** | 2017–present | 199 |
| 10 | (Austria) Florian Grillitsch | 2017–2022; 2023–2025 | 195 |

**Most goals for the club**

| Rank | Player | Career | Goals |
|---|---|---|---|
| 1 | (Croatia) **Andrej Kramarić** | 2016–present | 154 |
| 2 | (Bosnia and Herzegovina) Sejad Salihović | 2006–2015 | 67 |
| 3 | (Bosnia and Herzegovina) Vedad Ibišević | 2007–2012 | 54 |
| 4 | (Brazil) Roberto Firmino | 2011–2015 | 49 |
| 5 | (Germany) Thomas Ollhoff | 2002–2006 | 42 |
| 6 | (Senegal) Demba Ba | 2007–2011 | 40 |
| 7 | (Togo) **Ihlas Bebou** | 2019–present | 37 |
| 8 | (Germany) Kevin Volland | 2012–2016 | 36 |
| 9 | (Germany) Christoph Teinert | 2000–2003 | 34 |
| 10 | (Germany) Mark Uth | 2015–2018 | 33 |

- Players in **bold** are still playing for Hoffenheim.

== Women's team ==
The women's team started playing in 2006–07 and rushed through the lower leagues. The women's team plays at Dietmar-Hopp-Stadion.
