= 2013–14 RB Leipzig season =

RB Leipzig
2013–14 season
- Sporting Director: Ralf Rangnick
- Manager: Alexander Zorniger
- Stadium: Red Bull Arena
- 3. Liga: 2nd (promoted)
- DFB-Pokal: First round
- Saxony Cup: Semi-final
- Top goalscorer: League: Daniel Frahn (19); All: Daniel Frahn (20)
- Highest home attendance: 42,713 vs. 1. FC Saarbrücken, 3. Liga, 3 May 2014
- Lowest home attendance: 7,021 vs. Stuttgarter Kickers, 3. Liga, 7 December 2013
- Average home league attendance: 16,736
Home colours	Away colours

The 2013–14 RB Leipzig season was the 5th season in the club's football history and their first season competing in the professional & national level in Germany. Leipzig participated in the 2013–14 3. Liga season after winning the promotion playoff.

Leipzig participated in the DFB-Pokal after winning the 2013 Saxony Cup. They were eliminated in the first round by FC Augsburg. Leipzig also participates in the 2014 Saxony Cup since 3. Liga teams are allowed to participate in regional cups. They were eliminated in the semifinal by FC Oberlausitz Neugersdorf.

== Team uniform ==
Home	Away

== Review and events ==
The 2013–14 RB Leipzig season is the 5th season in the club's football history and their first season competing in the professional & national level in Germany. Leipzig was to participate in the 2013–14 3. Liga season after winning the 2012–13 Regionalliga Nordost and beating Sportfreunde Lotte in the promotion playoff.

They won their 3. Liga debut against Hallescher FC on 19 July by 1–0. The goalscorer was captain Daniel Frahn.

On 3 May 2014, they secured promotion to the 2. Bundesliga after defeating 1. FC Saarbrücken 5–1. They finished their first season in 3. Liga in second position, securing a direct promotion spot.

== Fixtures and results ==
=== Legend ===
Win Draw Loss Postponed

=== Friendlies ===
22 June 2013	FC Grimma	0–8	RB Leipzig	Grimma
16:00		Report	Morys 3'; Frahn 10'; Thomalla 26', 73'; Luge 51'; Kammlott 56', 72'; Schulz 70'	Stadium: Stadion der Freundschaft; Attendance: 1,250; Referee: Enrico Jahn

26 June 2013	FC Basel II	3–2	RB Leipzig	Walchsee
17:00	Streller 10'; Andrist 71'; Ajeti 86'	Report	Schulz 32'; Frahn 68'

1 July 2013	FC Liefering	0–1	RB Leipzig	Walchsee
17:00		Report	Frahn 35'

6 July 2013	RB Leipzig	3–0	FC Viktoria Köln	Leipzig
15:30	Poulsen 23'; Luge 65'; Thomalla 79'	Report		Stadium: RBL-Trainingzentrum; Attendance: 1,000

7 July 2013	RB Leipzig	2–0	TSV Havelse	Leipzig
15:30	Holm 38' (o.g.); Frahn 70'	Report		Stadium: RBL-Trainingzentrum; Attendance: 1,000

10 July 2013	RB Leipzig	0–1	HB Køge	Naunhof
17:30		Report	Tshiembe 13'	Stadium: Sportplatz Clade; Attendance: 650

13 July 2013	Hertha BSC	1–0	RB Leipzig	Dessau
15:00	Ramos 50'	Report		Stadium: Paul Greifzu Stadium; Attendance: 4,183; Referee: Martin Bärmann

23 July 2013	RB Leipzig	2–1	Werder Bremen	Leipzig
	Röttger 45'; Kammlott 59'	Report	Füllkrug 13'	Stadium: Red Bull Arena; Attendance: 8,947; Referee: Alexander Sather

6 January 2014	RB Leipzig	8–0	1. FC Bitterfeld-Wolfen	Leipzig
16:00	Luge 3', 25', 35'; Thomalla 17', 80'; Fandrich 49'; Kammlott 78'; Röttger 90'	Report		Stadium: RBL-Trainingzentrum; Attendance: 600

11 January 2014	FC Vaduz	0–0	RB Leipzig	Belek, Turkey
15:30		Report

14 January 2014	SSVg Velbert	0–3	RB Leipzig	Belek, Turkey
15:30		Report	Thomalla 25'; Kaiser 42'; Palacios 69'

17 January 2014	FC Thun	2–1	RB Leipzig	Belek, Turkey
15:30	Krstić 54'; Zuffi 81'	Report	Poulsen 66'

26 January 2014	RB Leipzig	1–0	FC Oberlausitz Neugersdorf	Leipzig
11:30	Fandrich 13'	Report		Stadium: RBL-Trainingzentrum; Attendance: 100

=== 3. Liga ===
==== League fixtures and results ====
19 July 2013 1	Hallescher FC	0–1	RB Leipzig	Halle
20:30		Report	Frahn 23'	Stadium: Erdgas Sportpark; Attendance: 14,022; Referee: Frank Willenborg

27 July 2013 2	RB Leipzig	2–2	SC Preußen Münster	Leipzig
14:00	Frahn 6'; Schulz 60'	Report	Siegert 44'; Krohne 80'	Stadium: Red Bull Arena; Attendance: 9,763; Referee: Thorsten Schriever

10 August 2013 3	SV Wacker Burghausen	1–2	RB Leipzig	Burghausen
14:00	Schröck 7'	Report	Frahn 13'; Kaiser 90+3'	Stadium: Wacker-Arena; Attendance: 2,600; Referee: Marcel Göpferich

18 August 2013 4	RB Leipzig	1–1	MSV Duisburg	Leipzig
14:00	Jung 33'	Report	Onuegbu 26'	Stadium: Red Bull Arena; Attendance: 13,758; Referee: Christian Dietz

24 August 2013 5	RB Leipzig	2–0	Rot-Weiß Erfurt	Leipzig
14:00	Poulsen 1', 87'	Report		Stadium: Red Bull Arena; Attendance: 14,109; Referee: Christian Leicher

31 August 2013 6	SV Wehen Wiesbaden	2–1	RB Leipzig	Wiesbaden
14:00	Book 22'; Vidović 38'	Report	Schulz 58'	Stadium: BRITA-Arena; Attendance: 4,122; Referee: Martin Petersen

3 September 2013 7	RB Leipzig	3–1	Holstein Kiel	Leipzig
19:00	Herrmann 50' (o.g.); Frahn 13', 90+4'	Report	Sykora 9'	Stadium: Red Bull Arena; Attendance: 11,714; Referee: Florian Heft

7 September 2013 8	SV Elversberg	1–0	RB Leipzig	Spiesen-Elversberg
14:00	Dausend 90+1'	Report		Stadium: Waldstadion an der Kaiserlinde; Attendance: 860; Referee: Benjamin Cortus

14 September 2013 9	RB Leipzig	3–1	VfB Stuttgart II	Leipzig
14:00	Frahn 1'; Röttger (yellow card) 22'; Morys 24'; Hoheneder (yellow card) 29'; Sebastian (yellow card) 38'; Ernst (yellow card) 70'; Schulz 90+1'	Report	Grüttner (yellow card) 51' (goal) 86'; Wanitzek (yellow card) 56'; Rathgeb (yellow card) 68'	Stadium: Red Bull Arena; Attendance: 9,869; Referee: Karl Valentin

20 September 2013 10	VfL Osnabrück	3–2	RB Leipzig	Osnabrück
19:00	Jung 32' (o.g.); Grimaldi 53'; Prokoph 83'	Report	Heidinger 13'; Poulsen 32'	Stadium: Osnatel-Arena; Attendance: 8,974; Referee: Markus Schmidt

28 September 2013 11	RB Leipzig	2–2	SpVgg Unterhaching	Leipzig
14:00	Kaiser 32'; Kammlott 75'	Report	Götze 34'; Duhnke 84'	Stadium: Red Bull Arena; Attendance: 13,894; Referee: Christian Bandurski

5 October 2013 12	1. FC Heidenheim	0–2	RB Leipzig	Heidenheim
14:00		Report	Frahn 62'; Kaiser 78'	Stadium: Voith-Arena; Attendance: 10,200; Referee: Jochen Drees

19 October 2013 13	RB Leipzig	2–0	Jahn Regensburg	Leipzig
14:00	Heidinger 44'; Frahn 83'	Report		Stadium: Red Bull Arena; Attendance: 8,742; Referee: Sven Jablonski

26 October 2013 14	Chemnitzer FC	3–1	RB Leipzig	Chemnitz
14:00	Mauersberger 17'; Garbuschewski 19'; Semmer 87'	Report	Thomalla 23'	Stadium: Stadion an der Gellertstraße; Attendance: 8,305; Referee: Günter Perl

2 November 2013 15	RB Leipzig	1–0	Borussia Dortmund II	Leipzig
14:00	Poulsen 12'	Report		Stadium: Red Bull Arena; Attendance: 11,477; Referee: Thomas Stein

9 November 2013 16	Darmstadt 98	0–1	RB Leipzig	Darmstadt
14:00		Report	Kaiser 68'	Stadium: Stadion am Böllenfalltor; Attendance: 7,200; Referee: Frank Willenborg

23 November 2013 17	RB Leipzig	1–2	Hansa Rostock	Leipzig
14:00	Kaiser 60'	Report	Blacha 37'; Plat 52'	Stadium: Red Bull Arena; Attendance: 23,421; Referee: Robert Hartmann

30 November 2013 18	1. FC Saarbrücken	2–3	RB Leipzig	Saarbrücken
14:00	Ziemer 1', 46'	Report	Franke 15'; Kimmich 52'; Willers 78'	Stadium: Ludwigsparkstadion; Attendance: 11,194; Referee: Timo Gerach

7 December 2013 19	RB Leipzig	2–1	Stuttgarter Kickers	Leipzig
14:00	Thomalla 21'; Luge 50'	Report	Marchese 38'	Stadium: Red Bull Arena; Attendance: 7,021; Referee: Harm Osmers

14 December 2013 20	SC Preußen Münster	0–0	RB Leipzig	Münster
14:00		Report		Stadium: Preußen-Stadion; Attendance: 6,787; Referee: Bibiana Steinhaus

21 December 2013 21	RB Leipzig	2–1	Hallescher FC	Leipzig
14:00	Kaiser 51'; Poulsen 65'	Report	Bertram 86'	Stadium: Red Bull Arena; Attendance: 20,354; Referee: Daniel Siebert

25 January 2014 22	RB Leipzig	0–1	SV Wacker Burghausen	Leipzig
14:00	Ernst (yellow card) 1'; Morys (yellow card) 9'	Report	Hefele (yellow card) 42'; Hauk 45' (yellow card) 72'; Moser (yellow card) 69'; Burkhard (yellow card) 75'	Stadium: Red Bull Arena; Attendance: 7,328; Referee: Patrick Alt

1 February 2014 23	MSV Duisburg	2–1	RB Leipzig	Duisburg
14:00	Aycicek 29'; Onuegbu 90'	Report	Frahn 57'	Stadium: Schauinsland-Reisen-Arena; Attendance: 11,012; Referee: Thorsten Kinhöfer

8 February 2014 24	Rot-Weiß Erfurt	0–2	RB Leipzig	Erfurt
14:00		Report	Kaiser 32'; Frahn 72'	Stadium: Steigerwaldstadion; Attendance: 11,240; Referee: Bibiana Steinhaus

16 February 2014 25	RB Leipzig	1–0	SV Wehen Wiesbaden	Leipzig
14:00	Kaiser 16'	Report		Stadium: Red Bull Arena; Attendance: 11,198; Referee: Benjamin Brand

22 February 2014 26	Holstein Kiel	0–2	RB Leipzig	Kiel
14:00		Report	Frahn 11'; Heidinger 55'	Stadium: Holstein-Stadion; Attendance: 4,946; Referee: Christian Dingert

2 March 2014 27	RB Leipzig	2–0	SV Elversberg	Leipzig
14:00	Kaiser 23'; Röttger 65'	Report		Stadium: Red Bull Arena; Attendance: 18,487; Referee: Tobias Reichel

7 March 2014 28	VfB Stuttgart II	0–2	RB Leipzig	Stuttgart
19:00		Report	Frahn 28'; Poulsen 63'	Stadium: Gazi-Stadion auf der Waldau; Attendance: 1,300; Referee: Steffen Mix

16 March 2014 29	RB Leipzig	1–0	VfL Osnabrück	Leipzig
14:00	Frahn 28'	Report		Stadium: Red Bull Arena; Attendance: 12,205; Referee: Christian Fischer

22 March 2014 30	SpVgg Unterhaching	1–1	RB Leipzig	Unterhaching
14:00	Bichler 25'	Report	Poulsen 22'	Stadium: Stadion am Sportpark; Referee: Robert Kempter

26 March 2014 31	RB Leipzig	1–1	1. FC Heidenheim	Leipzig
20:15	Poulsen 44'	Report	Wittek 73'	Stadium: Red Bull Arena; Attendance: 25,312; Referee: Arne Aarnink

29 March 2014 32	Jahn Regensburg	0–3	RB Leipzig	Regensburg
14:00		Report	Frahn 1'; Jung 20'; Hoheneder 86'	Stadium: Jahnstadion; Attendance: 4,022; Referee: Stefan Glasmacher

5 April 2014 33	RB Leipzig	2–1	Chemnitzer FC	Leipzig
14:00	Fandrich 25'; Kaiser 77'	Report	Hofrath 35'	Stadium: Red Bull Arena; Attendance: 17,479; Referee: Sascha Stegemann

15 April 2014 34	Borussia Dortmund II	3–3	RB Leipzig	Dortmund
14:00	Treude 32'; Harder 36', 48'	Report	Frahn 18', 80'; Heidinger 84'	Stadium: Stadion Rote Erde; Attendance: 4,039; Referee: Tobias Reichel

19 April 2014 35	RB Leipzig	1–0	Darmstadt 98	Leipzig
14:00	Jung 15'	Report		Stadium: Red Bull Arena; Attendance: 39,147; Referee: Thorsten Kinhöfer

26 April 2014 36	Hansa Rostock	0–1	RB Leipzig	Rostock
14:00		Report	Frahn 44'	Stadium: DKB-Arena; Attendance: 14,200; Referee: Bibiana Steinhaus

3 May 2014 37	RB Leipzig	5–1	1. FC Saarbrücken	Leipzig
13:30	Kaiser 7', 35', 48'; Frahn 9', 14'	Report	Reisinger 53'	Stadium: Red Bull Arena; Attendance: 42,713; Referee: Robert Kempter

10 May 2014 38	Stuttgarter Kickers	1 – 3	RB Leipzig	Stuttgart
13:30	Badiane 90'	Report	Röttger 36'; Poulsen 45', 69'	Stadium: Gazi-Stadion auf der Waldau; Attendance: 5,800; Referee: Benjamin Cortus

==== League table ====
Pos	Team	Pld	W	D	L	GF	GA	GD	Pts	Promotion, qualification or relegation
1	1. FC Heidenheim (C, P)	38	23	10	5	59	25	+34	79	Promotion to 2. Bundesliga and qualification for DFB-Pokal
2	RB Leipzig (P)	38	24	7	7	65	34	+31	79	Promotion to 2. Bundesliga and qualification for DFB-Pokal
3	Darmstadt 98 (O, P)	38	21	9	8	58	29	+29	72	Qualification to promotion play-offs and DFB-Pokal
4	Wehen Wiesbaden	38	15	11	12	43	44	−1	56	Qualification for DFB-Pokal
5	VfL Osnabrück	38	15	10	13	50	39	+11	55	

Source: kicker.de
Rules for classification: 1) points; 2) goal difference; 3) number of goals scored.
(C) Champions; (O) Play-off winners; (P) Promoted

=== DFB-Pokal ===
2 August 2013 First Round	RB Leipzig	0–2	FC Augsburg	Leipzig
20:00		Report	Callsen-Bracker 5'; Altıntop 69'	Stadium: Red Bull Arena; Attendance: 30,307; Referee: Tobias Stieler

=== Saxony Cup ===
13 October 2013 Third Round	1. FC Lokomotive Leipzig	0–2	RB Leipzig	Leipzig
15:00		Report	Kaiser 23'; Frahn 63'	Stadium: Red Bull Arena; Attendance: 14,377; Referee: Jens Klemm

16 November 2013 Fourth Round	BSV Gelenau	0–11	RB Leipzig	Grimma
13:30		Report	Kammlott 13'; Schulz 32', 70'; Thiago Rockenbach da Silva 41'; Röttger 45', 65', 78'; Papadimitriou 56', 76'; Sebastian 74'; Fandrich 82'	Stadium: Stadion der Freundschaft; Attendance: 2,000; Referee: Daniel Hartig

26 February 2014 Quarterfinal	FC Eilenburg	0–4	RB Leipzig	Eilenburg
18:00		Report	Röttger 18'; Sebastian 27'; Morys 30'; Luge 80'	Stadium: Ilburg-Stadion; Attendance: 2,100; Referee: Benjamin Seidl

9 April 2014 Semifinal	FC Oberlausitz Neugersdorf	1–0	RB Leipzig	Neugersdorf
17:30	Kunze 52'	Report		Stadium: ENSO-Oberlausitzarena; Attendance: 2,013; Referee: Josef Jurk

== Squad ==
=== Squad, appearances and goals scored ===
As of 10 May 2014

No.	Pos	Nat	Player	Total		3. Liga		DFB-Pokal		Saxony Cup	
No.	Pos	Nat	Player	Apps	Goals	Apps	Goals	Apps	Goals	Apps	Goals
1	GK	(Switzerland) SUI	Fabio Coltorti	22	0	20	0	1	0	1	0
3	DF	(Germany) GER	Anthony Jung	28	3	23	3	1	0	4	0
4	DF	(Germany) GER	Tobias Willers	22	1	18	1	1	0	3	0
5	MF	(Germany) GER	Hendrik Ernst	21	0	20	0	0	0	1	0
8	DF	(Germany) GER	Tim Sebastian	32	2	29	0	0	0	3	2
9	FW	(Denmark) DEN	Yussuf Poulsen	36	10	35	10	1	0	0	0
10	MF	(Brazil) BRA	Thiago Rockenbach da Silva (on loan to Hertha BSC II)	5	1	4	0	0	0	1	1
11	FW	(Germany) GER	Daniel Frahn	35	20	33	19	1	0	1	1
17	MF	(Germany) GER	Joshua Kimmich	26	1	25	1	0	0	1	0
18	FW	(Germany) GER	Timo Röttger	34	6	29	2	1	0	4	4
19	FW	(Germany) GER	Matthias Morys	20	2	18	1	1	0	1	1
20	FW	(Germany) GER	Denis Thomalla	20	2	17	2	0	0	3	0
21	DF	(Finland) FIN	Mikko Sumusalo	4	0	2	0	0	0	2	0
22	GK	(Germany) GER	Benjamin Bellot	12	0	11	0	0	0	1	0
23	DF	(Austria) AUT	Niklas Hoheneder	34	1	32	1	1	0	1	0
24	MF	(Germany) GER	Dominik Kaiser	38	14	36	13	1	0	1	1
25	MF	(Greece) GRE	Christos Papadimitriou (on loan to FC Liefering)	2	2	1	0	0	0	1	2
26	GK	(Germany) GER	Eric Domaschke	9	0	8	0	0	0	1	0
28	DF	(Germany) GER	Fabian Franke	25	1	22	1	0	0	3	0
29	MF	(Germany) GER	Sebastian Heidinger	31	4	30	4	0	0	1	0
30	DF	(Germany) GER	Christian Müller	12	0	10	0	1	0	1	0
31	MF	(Germany) GER	Diego Demme	16	0	15	0	0	0	1	0
32	FW	(Germany) GER	Federico Palacios Martínez	6	0	5	0	0	0	1	0
33	MF	(Germany) GER	André Luge	10	2	6	1	0	0	4	1
34	MF	(Germany) GER	Clemens Fandrich	23	2	20	1	1	0	2	1
38	MF	(Germany) GER	Fabian Schößler	1	0	0	0	0	0	1	0
39	MF	(Austria) AUT	Georg Teigl	13	0	12	0	0	0	1	0
40	GK	(Germany) GER	Fabian Bredlow	1	0	0	0	0	0	1	0
41	FW	(Germany) GER	Tom Nattermann	1	0	0	0	0	0	1	0
Players who left the club during the 2013–14 season
15	MF	(Germany) GER	Bastian Schulz	18	5	15	3	1	0	2	2
16	DF	(Germany) GER	Juri Judt	8	0	6	0	1	0	1	0
27	FW	(Germany) GER	Carsten Kammlott	16	2	13	1	1	0	2	1

=== Transfers ===
==== In ====
No.	Pos.	Name	Age	EU	Moving from	Type	Transfer Window	Contract ends	Transfer fee	Sources
3	DF	Anthony Jung	21	Yes	FSV Frankfurt	Transfer	Summer	2016	Free	
4	DF	Tobias Willers	26	Yes	Sportfreunde Lotte	Transfer	Summer	2015	Free	
9	FW	Yussuf Poulsen	19	Yes	Lyngby BK	Transfer	Summer	2017	€650,000	
17	MF	Joshua Kimmich	18	Yes	VfB Stuttgart	Transfer	Summer	2015	Undisclosed	
20	FW	Denis Thomalla	20	Yes	TSG Hoffenheim	Transfer	Summer	2017	Free	
21	DF	Mikko Sumusalo	23	Yes	HJK	Transfer	Winter	2016	Free	
25	MF	Christos Papadimitriou	19	Yes	AEK Athens	Transfer	Summer	2014	€200,000	
31	MF	Diego Demme	22	Yes	SC Paderborn	Transfer	Winter	2018	€350,000	
32	FW	Federico Palacios Martínez	18	Yes	VfL Wolfsburg	Transfer	Winter	2018	€600,000	
33	MF	André Luge	22	Yes	FSV Zwickau	Transfer	Summer	2017	Undisclosed	
39	MF	Georg Teigl	22	Yes	Red Bull Salzburg	Transfer	Winter	2015	Undisclosed	

==== Out ====
No.	Pos.	Name	Age	EU	Moving to	Type	Transfer Window	Transfer fee	Sources
2	DF	Marcus Hoffmann	25	Yes		Released	Summer	Free	
10	MF	Thiago Rockenbach da Silva	28	No	Hertha BSC II	Loan	Winter	Free	
13	FW	Tom Nattermann	20	Yes		Released	Summer	Free	
14	DF	Patrick Koronkiewicz	22	Yes		Released	Summer	Free	
15	DF	Bastian Schulz	28	Yes	VfL Wolfsburg II	Released	Winter	Free	
16	DF	Juri Judt	27	Yes		Released	Winter	Free	
17	DF	Umut Koçin	25	Yes		Released	Summer	Free	
21	MF	Paul Schinke	22	Yes		Released	Summer	Free	
25	MF	Christos Papadimitriou	19	Yes	FC Liefering	Loan	Winter	Free	
27	FW	Carsten Kammlott	23	Yes	Rot-Weiß Erfurt	Transfer	Winter	Free	
