= 2014–15 RB Leipzig season =

RB Leipzig
2014–15 season
- Sporting Director: Ralf Rangnick
- Manager: Achim Beierlorzer
- Stadium: Red Bull Arena
- 2. Bundesliga: 5th
- DFB-Pokal: Round of 16
- Top goalscorer: League: Yussuf Poulsen (11 goals); All: Yussuf Poulsen (12 goals)
- Highest home attendance: 38,660 vs. FC St. Pauli, 23 November 2014
- Lowest home attendance: 17,087 vs. Fortuna Düsseldorf, 16 March 2015
- Average home league attendance: 25,024
Home colours	Away colours

The 2014–15 RB Leipzig season was the 6th season in club history and their first season competing in the 2. Bundesliga. The team missed out on promotion and finished in the upper half of the league.

== Kits ==
Home	Away

== Background ==
Leipzig will play in the 2014–15 2. Bundesliga after having been promoted from 3. Liga by finishing second, where they only played for one season.

=== Transfers ===
==== In ====
No.	Pos.	Name	Age	EU	Moving from	Type	Transfer Window	Contract ends	Transfer fee	Ref.
4	MF	(Philippines) John-Patrick Strauß	18	Yes	RB Leipzig Youth	Promoted	Summer	2016	–	
6	MF	(Germany) Rani Khedira	20	Yes	VfB Stuttgart	Transfer	Summer	2017	€500,000	
10	FW	(Croatia) Ante Rebić	20	Yes	ACF Fiorentina	Loan	Summer	2015	Undisclosed	
12	MF	(Sweden) Emil Forsberg	23	Yes	Malmö FF	Transfer	Winter	2018	Undisclosed	
13	FW	(Israel) Omer Damari	25	No	Austria Wien	Transfer	Winter	2018	Undisclosed	
14	FW	(Germany) Smail Prevljak	19	Yes	RB Leipzig Youth	Promoted	Summer	2016	–	
16	DF	(Germany) Lukas Klostermann	18	Yes	VfL Bochum	Transfer	Summer	2018	€300,000	
18	FW	(United States) Terrence Boyd	23	Yes	Rapid Wien	Transfer	Summer	2019	€2,000,000	
19	MF	(Hungary) Zsolt Kalmár	19	Yes	Győri ETO FC	Transfer	Summer	2019	Undisclosed	
20	DF	(Brazil) Rodnei	29	No	FC Red Bull Salzburg	Transfer	Winter	2015	Undisclosed	
25	MF	(Austria) Stefan Hierländer	23	Yes	FC Red Bull Salzburg	Transfer	Summer	2016	Free	
27	GK	(Germany) Thomas Dähne	20	Yes	FC Red Bull Salzburg	Transfer	Summer	2015	Free	
33	DF	(Germany) Marvin Compper	29	Yes	ACF Fiorentina	Transfer	Summer	2017	Undisclosed	
34	FW	(Peru) Yordy Reyna	21	No	FC Red Bull Salzburg	Loan	Winter	2015	Undisclosed	
	MF	(Belgium) Massimo Bruno	20	Yes	Anderlecht	Transfer	Summer	2019	€5,000,000	
	FW	(Austria) Marcel Sabitzer	20	Yes	Rapid Wien	Transfer	Summer	2018	€2,000,000	

==== Out ====
No.	Pos.	Name	Age	EU	Moving to	Type	Transfer Window	Transfer fee	Ref.
1	GK	(Germany) Fabian Bredlow	19	Yes	FC Liefering	Loan	Summer	–	
7	MF	(Germany) André Luge	23	Yes	SV Elversberg	Loan	Summer	–	
10	MF	(Brazil) Thiago Rockenbach da Silva	29	No	Hertha BSC II	Released	Summer	Free	
14	DF	(Finland) Mikko Sumusalo	24	Yes	F.C. Hansa Rostock	Loan	Winter	–	
18	FW	(Germany) Federico Palacios Martínez	19	Yes	FC Rot-Weiß Erfurt	Loan	Winter	–	
18	MF	(Germany) Timo Röttger	28	Yes	FC Viktoria Köln	Released	Summer	Free	
24	FW	(Austria) Marcel Sabitzer	20	Yes	FC Red Bull Salzburg	Loan	Summer	–	
24	DF	(Germany) Tobias Willers	27	Yes	VfL Osnabrück	Transfer	Summer	–	
25	MF	(Germany) Clemens Fandrich	24	Yes	Erzgebirge Aue	Loan	Winter	–	
31	FW	(Germany) Denis Thomalla	22	Yes	SV Ried	Loan	Summer	–	
33	FW	(Germany) Matthias Morys	27	Yes	SG Sonnenhof Großaspach	Loan	Winter	–	
45	FW	(Germany) Smail Prevljak	19	Yes	FC Liefering	Loan	Summer	–	
77	MF	(Belgium) Massimo Bruno	20	Yes	FC Red Bull Salzburg	Loan	Summer	–	
	MF	(Greece) Christos Papadimitriou	20	Yes		Released	Summer	Free	
	DF	(Germany) Christian Müller	30	Yes		Released	Summer	Free	

== Friendlies ==
Win Draw Loss Postponed

Date	Kickoff^{1}	Venue	City	Opponent	Res.^{2}	Att.	Goalscorers		Ref.
Date	Kickoff^{1}	Venue	City	Opponent	Res.^{2}	Att.	RB Leipzig	Opponent	Ref.
22 June 2014	15:30	A	Zwenkau	VfB Zwenkau 02	7–0	2,517	Teigl 15'; Hoheneder 33'; Frahn 39'; Prevljak 70'; Poulsen 77'; Luge 79'; Palacios 83'		
25 June 2014	18:30	A	Neuruppin	MSV Neuruppin	11–0	400	Hierländer 3'; Prevljak 29', 39'; Frahn 46', 50', 68', 77' (pen.) 89'; Strauß 48'; Poulsen 69'; Morys 79'		
29 June 2014	15:00	A	Grimma	TSV Havelse	4–0	400	Palacios 56'; Prevljak 61'; Morys 81'; Thomalla 90' (pen.)		
2 July 2014	18:30	A	Markranstädt	SSV Markranstädt	2–0	2,473	Sebastian 54'; Morys 67'		
8 July 2014	18:00	A	Irdning	Kapfenberger SV	5–1		Kaiser 24'; Poulsen 30'; Thomalla 51'; Palacios 80'; Prevljak 88'	Vollmann 77'	
12 July 2014	17:00	A	Salzburg	SG Sonnenhof Großaspach	2–3		Poulsen 40'; Boyd 56'	Rühle 4'; Sohm 64'; Fischer 73'	
18 July 2014	19:00	H	Leipzig	Paris Saint-Germain F.C.	4–2	35,796	Boyd 25'; Poulsen 51'; Thomalla 65'; Hierländer 76'	Ongenda 10'; Bahebeck 27'	
23 July 2014	20:00	H	Leipzig	Getafe CF	2–3	5,873	Prevljak 47'; Strauß 62'	Vázquez 25', 29'; Astray 68'	
26 July 2014	14:30	A	Gera	Queens Park Rangers F.C.	2–0	2,950	Poulsen 62', 72'		
6 September 2014	13:00	A	Grimma	Pogoń Szczecin	1–0	502	Nattermann 72'		
10 October 2014		H	Leipzig	Kickers 94 Markkleeberg	2–1	500	Boyd 38'; Frahn 55'	Legler 63'	
15 November 2014	13:30	H	Leipzig	FC Rubin Kazan	2–1	2,115	Boyd 6'; Fandrich 12'	Dyadyun 62'	
10 January 2015	16:00	H	Leipzig	FSV Barleben	1–0	600	Morys 78'		
14 January 2015	16:00	H	Leipzig	Goslarer SC 08	2–0	580	Frahn 42'; Palacios 71'		
17 January 2015	14:00	H	Leipzig	Berliner AK 07	2–0	950	Siebeck 68'; Demme 80'		
23 January 2015		A	Doha	Qatar SC	2–1	42	Forsberg 45'; Kalmár 65'	Harbaoui 44'	
27 January 2015	18:30	A	Doha	FC Red Bull Salzburg	3–3		Forsberg 40'; Poulsen 60'; Frahn 87'	Soriano 5' (pen.); Minamino 48'; Berisha 58'	
31 January 2015	17:30	H	Leipzig	VfR Aalen	1–1	5,132	Reyna 79'	Ludwig 38'	
27 March 2015		H	Leipzig	Udinese Calcio	2–2	7,196	Kaiser 38'; Strauß 65'	Théréau 7'; Aguirre 63'	

== 2. Bundesliga ==
=== Fixtures & results ===
Win Draw Loss Postponed

MD	Date	Kickoff^{1}	Venue	City	Opponent	Res. F–A	Att.	Goalscorers		Table			Ref.
MD	Date	Kickoff^{1}	Venue	City	Opponent	Res. F–A	Att.	RB Leipzig	Opponent	Pos.	Pts.	GD	Ref.
1	2 August 2014	13:00	H	Leipzig	VfR Aalen	0–0	21,354			11th	1	0	
2	10 August 2014	15:30	A	Munich	TSV 1860 München	3–0	32,000	Poulsen 39'; Morys 68'; Thomalla 82'		4th	4	+3	
3	22 August 2014	18:30	H	Leipzig	FC Erzgebirge Aue	1–0	34,273	Frahn 3'		1st	7	+4	
4	29 August 2014	18:30	A	Frankfurt	FSV Frankfurt	0–0	6,043			3rd	8	+4	
5	13 September 2014	13:00	H	Leipzig	Eintracht Braunschweig	3–1	24,949	Poulsen 19', 84'; Frahn 20'	Nielsen 48'	2nd	11	+6	
6	21 September 2014	13:30	A	Berlin	1. FC Union Berlin	1–2	21,366	Poulsen 77'	Polter 70', 83'	4th	11	+5	
7	24 September 2014	17:30	H	Leipzig	Karlsruher SC	3–1	18,235	Kaiser 37'; Poulsen 48', 58'	Mitsanski 33'	2nd	14	+7	
8	28 September 2014	13:30	A	Düsseldorf	Fortuna Düsseldorf	2–2	30,477	Teigl 18', 61'	Pohjanpalo 60'; Benschop 86'	3rd	15	+7	
9	6 October 2014	20:15	H	Leipzig	1. FC Heidenheim	1–1	18,820	Kaiser 31'	Heise 21'	4th	16	+7	
10	17 October 2014	20:30	A	Nürnberg	1. FC Nürnberg	0–1	28,571		Schöpf 74'	5th	16	+6	
11	24 October 2014	18:30	H	Leipzig	VfL Bochum	2–0	30,194	Holthaus 7' (o.g.); Frahn 33'		3rd	19	+8	
12	3 November 2014	20:15	H	Leipzig	1. FC Kaiserslautern	0–0	25,637			3rd	20	+8	
13	8 November 2014	13:00	A	Darmstadt	SV Darmstadt 98	0–1	14,400		Stroh-Engel 5'	7th	20	+7	
14	23 November 2014	13:30	H	Leipzig	FC St. Pauli	4–1	38,660	Poulsen 17'; Boyd 30', 53'; Verhoek 73' (o.g.)	Alushi 46'	5th	23	+10	
15	30 November 2014	13:30	A	Sandhausen	SV Sandhausen	0–0	4,518			7th	24	+10	
16	7 December 2014	13:30	H	Leipzig	FC Ingolstadt 04	0–1	23,985		Groß 9'	8th	24	+9	
17	12 December 2014	18:30	A	Fürth	SpVgg Greuther Fürth	1–0	10,225	Hoheneder 77'		6th	27	+10	
18	17 December 2014	17:30	A	Aalen	VfR Aalen	0–0	5,015			5th	28	+10	
19	22 December 2014	20:15	H	Leipzig	TSV 1860 München	1–1	27,370	Poulsen 29'	Okotie 86'	7th	29	+10	
20	6 February 2015	18:30	A	Aue	FC Erzgebirge Aue	0–2	13,600		Alibaz 45'; Schönfeld 59' (pen.)	7th	29	+8	
21	15 February 2015	13:30	H	Leipzig	FSV Frankfurt	0–1	18,237		Roshi 58'	8th	29	+7	
22	23 February 2015	20:15	A	Braunschweig	Eintracht Braunschweig	1–1	20,650	Kaiser 84'	Berggreen 45'	8th	30	+7	
23	1 March 2015	13:30	H	Leipzig	1. FC Union Berlin	3–2	24,780	Kaiser 3' (pen.); Kimmich 7'; Teigl 13'	Skrzybski 8'; Polter 29'	8th	33	+8	
24	9 March 2015	20:15	A	Karlsruhe	Karlsruher SC	0–0	17,829			6th	34	+8	
25	16 March 2015	20:15	H	Leipzig	Fortuna Düsseldorf	3–1	17,087	Rodnei 7'; Kimmich 28'; Poulsen 71'	Pohjanpalo 59'	5th	37	+10	
26	22 March 2015	13:30	A	Heidenheim	1. FC Heidenheim	0–1	12,000		Niederlechner 51'	7th	37	+9	
27	5 April 2015	13:30	H	Leipzig	1. FC Nürnberg	2–1	30,479	Reyna 46'; Kaiser 76'	Burgstaller 29'	6th	40	+10	
28	12 April 2015	13:30	A	Bochum	VfL Bochum	2–1	18,529	Poulsen 13'; Kaiser 67'	Terodde 62'	6th	43	+11	
29	20 April 2015	20:15	A	Kaiserslautern	1. FC Kaiserslautern	1–1	30,000	Poulsen 16'	Zoller 20'	5th	44	+11	
30	24 April 2015	18:30	H	Leipzig	SV Darmstadt 98	2–1	25,336	Klostermann 79'; Coltorti 90+3'	Behrens 77'	5th	47	+12	
31	3 May 2015	13:30	A	Hamburg	FC St. Pauli	0–1	23,584		Thy 45'	6th	47	+11	
32	8 May 2015	18:30	H	Leipzig	SV Sandhausen	0–4	18,904		Thiede 36'; Bouhaddouz 54', 59', 74'	6th	47	+7	
33	17 May 2015	15:30	A	Ingolstadt	FC Ingolstadt 04	1–2	15,000	Kaiser 4'	Leckie 45+1'; Lex 77'	6th	47	+6	
34	24 May 2015	15:30	H	Leipzig	SpVgg Greuther Fürth	2–0	27,117	Frahn 29'; Kaiser 45'		5th	50	+8	

=== League table ===
Pos	Team	Pld	W	D	L	GF	GA	GD	Pts	Promotion, qualification or relegation
3	Karlsruher SC	34	15	13	6	46	26	+20	58	Qualification for promotion play-offs
4	1. FC Kaiserslautern	34	14	14	6	45	31	+14	56	
5	RB Leipzig	34	13	11	10	39	31	+8	50	
6	Eintracht Braunschweig	34	15	5	14	44	41	+3	50	
7	Union Berlin	34	12	11	11	46	51	−5	47	

Source: DFB
Rules for classification: 1) Points; 2) Goal difference; 3) Goals scored

== DFB–Pokal ==
=== DFB–Pokal review ===
RB Leipzig were drawn against Bundesliga side SC Paderborn in the first round, the match will be played in Leipzig. They won in extra time against FC Erzgebirge Aue in the second round and reached the third round of the DFB–Pokal for the first time. They were drawn against Bundesliga team VfL Wolfsburg, who they beat in the 2011–12 DFB-Pokal first round.

=== DFB–Pokal results ===
Win Draw Loss Postponed

RD	Date	Kickoff^{1}	Venue	City	Opponent	Result^{2}	Attendance	Goalscorers		Ref.
RD	Date	Kickoff^{1}	Venue	City	Opponent	Result^{2}	Attendance	Leipzig	Opponent	Ref.
Round 1	17 August 2014	18:30	H	Leipzig	SC Paderborn	2–1 (a.e.t.)	24,348	Jung 43'; Fandrich 109'	Koç 27'	
Round 2	29 October 2014	19:00	H	Leipzig	FC Erzgebirge Aue	3–1 (a.e.t.)	28,419	Poulsen 90+1'; Kaiser 98'; Boyd 108'	Holthaus 20' (o.g.)	
Round 3	4 March 2015	19:00	H	Leipzig	VfL Wolfsburg	0–2	43,348		Caligiuri 20'; Klose 57'	

== Player informations ==
As of 24 May 2015

No.	Pos	Nat	Player	Total		2. Bundesliga		DFB-Pokal	
No.	Pos	Nat	Player	Apps	Goals	Apps	Goals	Apps	Goals
1	GK	(Switzerland) SUI	Fabio Coltorti	23	1	21	1	2	0
3	DF	(Germany) GER	Anthony Jung	35	1	32	0	3	1
5	MF	(Germany) GER	Hendrik Ernst	1	0	1	0	0	0
6	MF	(Germany) GER	Rani Khedira	24	0	22	0	2	0
8	DF	(Germany) GER	Tim Sebastian	30	0	27	0	3	0
9	FW	(Denmark) DEN	Yussuf Poulsen	32	12	29	11	3	1
10	FW	(Croatia) CRO	Ante Rebić	11	0	10	0	1	0
11	FW	(Germany) GER	Daniel Frahn	25	4	23	4	2	0
12	MF	(Sweden) SWE	Emil Forsberg	15	0	14	0	1	0
13	FW	(Israel) ISR	Omer Damari	11	0	10	0	1	0
16	DF	(Germany) GER	Lukas Klostermann	15	1	13	1	2	0
17	MF	(Germany) GER	Joshua Kimmich	29	2	27	2	2	0
18	FW	(United States) USA	Terrence Boyd	8	3	7	2	1	1
19	MF	(Hungary) HUN	Zsolt Kalmár	17	0	17	0	0	0
20	DF	(Brazil) BRA	Rodnei	7	1	6	1	1	0
22	GK	(Germany) GER	Benjamin Bellot	14	0	13	0	1	0
23	DF	(Austria) AUT	Niklas Hoheneder	11	1	10	1	1	0
24	MF	(Germany) GER	Dominik Kaiser	33	9	30	8	3	1
25	MF	(Austria) AUT	Stefan Hierländer	22	0	21	0	1	0
27	GK	(Germany) GER	Thomas Dähne	0	0	0	0	0	0
28	DF	(Germany) GER	Fabian Franke	0	0	0	0	0	0
29	MF	(Germany) GER	Sebastian Heidinger	17	0	16	0	1	0
31	MF	(Germany) GER	Diego Demme	32	0	29	0	3	0
33	DF	(Germany) GER	Marvin Compper	27	0	27	0	0	0
34	FW	(Peru) PER	Yordy Reyna	14	1	13	1	1	0
39	MF	(Austria) AUT	Georg Teigl	33	3	31	3	2	0
Players who left the club during the 2014–15 season
4	DF	(Germany) GER	Tobias Willers	1	0	0	0	1	0
7	FW	(Germany) GER	Matthias Morys (on loan to SG Sonnenhof Großaspach)	14	1	13	1	1	0
14	FW	(Germany) GER	Smail Prevljak (on loan to FC Liefering)	1	0	1	0	0	0
20	FW	(Germany) GER	Denis Thomalla (on loan to SV Ried)	3	1	3	1	0	0
21	DF	(Finland) FIN	Mikko Sumusalo (on loan to F.C. Hansa Rostock)	0	0	0	0	0	0
32	FW	(Germany) GER	Federico Palacios Martínez (on loan to FC Rot-Weiß Erfurt)	3	0	2	0	1	0
34	MF	(Germany) GER	Clemens Fandrich (on loan to Erzgebirge Aue)	10	1	8	0	2	1

== Notes ==
- 1.Kickoff time in Central European Time/Central European Summer Time.
- 2.RB Leipzig's goals first.
