= 2015–16 RB Leipzig season =

RB Leipzig
2015–16 season
- Sporting Director: Ralf Rangnick
- Manager: Ralf Rangnick
- Stadium: Red Bull Arena
- 2. Bundesliga: 2nd (Promoted)
- DFB-Pokal: Round 2
- Top goalscorer: League: Davie Selke (10 goals); All: Davie Selke (10 goals)
- Highest home attendance: 42,559 vs. Karlsruher SC, 8 May 2016
- Lowest home attendance: 19,119 vs. FSV Frankfurt, 13 December 2015
- Average home league attendance: 29,440
Home colours	Away colours	Third colours

The 2015–16 RB Leipzig season was the 7th season in club history and their 2nd season competing in the 2. Bundesliga.

== Kits ==
Home	Home alt	Away	Away alt

== Background ==
=== Events ===
On May 29, 2015, Ralf Rangnick was appointed to replace Achim Beierlorzer as the head coach. On June 9, 2015, it was confirmed they will play against Southampton F.C. on July 8, 2015.

=== Transfers ===
==== In ====
No.	Pos.	Name	Age	EU	Moving from	Type	Transfer Window	Contract ends	Transfer fee	Ref.
4	DF	(Germany) Willi Orban	22	Yes	1. FC Kaiserslautern	Transfer	Summer	2019	Undisclosed	
5	DF	(Turkey) Atınç Nukan	21	No	Beşiktaş J.K.	Transfer	Summer	2020	€6,000,000	
13	MF	(Austria) Stefan Ilsanker	26	Yes	FC Red Bull Salzburg	Transfer	Summer	2018	Undisclosed	
17	FW	(Germany) Nils Quaschner	21	Yes	FC Red Bull Salzburg	Transfer	Summer	2018	Undisclosed	
20	MF	(Germany) Ken Gipson	19	Yes	VfB Stuttgart	Transfer	Summer	2018	Free	
21	DF	(Russia) Dmitri Skopintsev	18	No	FC Zenit Saint Petersburg	Transfer	Summer	2019	Undisclosed	
23	DF	(Germany) Marcel Halstenberg	23	Yes	FC St. Pauli	Transfer	Summer	2019	Undisclosed	
27	FW	(Germany) Davie Selke	20	Yes	SV Werder Bremen	Transfer	Summer	2020	€8,000,000	
32	GK	(Hungary) Péter Gulácsi	25	Yes	FC Red Bull Salzburg	Transfer	Summer	2019	Undisclosed	
	MF	(Germany) Gino Fechner	17	Yes	VfL Bochum	Transfer	Summer		Undisclosed	
	MF	(Poland) Kamil Wojtkowski	18	Yes	Pogoń Szczecin	Transfer	Summer	2017		

==== Out ====
No.	Pos.	Name	Age	EU	Moving to	Type	Transfer Window	Transfer fee	Ref.
	MF	(Germany) Joshua Kimmich	20	Yes	Bayern Munich	Transfer	Summer	€1,500,000	
	MF	(Germany) Henrik Ernst	28	Yes	RB Leipzig II	Transfer	Summer	Free	
	DF	(Germany) Fabian Franke	26	Yes	SV Wehen Wiesbaden	Transfer	Summer	Undisclosed	
	FW	(Germany) Daniel Frahn	27	Yes	1. FC Heidenheim	Transfer	Summer	Released	
	MF	(Germany) Sebastian Heidinger	29	Yes	1. FC Heidenheim	Transfer	Summer	Undisclosed	
	DF	(Austria) Niklas Hoheneder	28	Yes	SC Paderborn 07	Transfer	Summer	Released	
	GK	(Germany) Thomas Dähne	21	Yes		Transfer	Summer	Released	
	GK	(Germany) Fabian Bredlow	20	Yes	Hallescher FC	Transfer	Summer	Undisclosed	
	FW	(Israel) Omer Damari	26	Yes	Red Bull Salzburg	Loan	Summer	Undisclosed	
	FW	(Germany) Matthias Morys	28	Yes	VfR Aalen	Transfer	Summer	Undisclosed	
	MF	(Germany) Clemens Fandrich	24	Yes	FC Luzern	Transfer	Summer	Undisclosed	
	DF	(Germany) Tim Sebastian	31	Yes	SC Paderborn 07	Transfer	Winter	Undisclosed	
	MF	(Hungary) Zsolt Kalmár	20	Yes	FSV Frankfurt	Loan	Winter	Undisclosed	

== Friendlies ==
Win Draw Loss Postponed

Date	Kickoff^{1}	Venue	City	Opponent	Res.^{2}	Att.	Goalscorers		Ref.
Date	Kickoff^{1}	Venue	City	Opponent	Res.^{2}	Att.	RB Leipzig	Opponent	Ref.
20 June 2015	15:30	A	Herzberg (Elster)	Berliner AK 07	2–0	894	Wagner 42'; Dzalto 68'		
27 June 2015	15:30	A	Markranstädt	Kickers 94 Markkleeberg	15–0	1,032	Teigl 7'; Selke 11', 33', 38'; Kaiser 21'; Khedira 35'; Reddemann 55'; Dzalto 58' 65' 85'; Endres 71'; Palacios 75'; Hierländer 79' 89'; Demme 86'		
1 July 2015	17:30	A	Grimma	FSV Budissa Bautzen	2–1	877	Endres 52'; Hierländer 67'	Salewski 53'	
4 July 2015	16:30	A	Grimma	Slovan Liberec	3–0	648	Quaschner 35'; Forsberg 40'; Strauß 59'		
8 July 2015	18:00	A	Leogang	Southampton F.C.	5–4		Quaschner 25'; Mauer 55'; Sebastian 59'; Kalmár 67'; Strauß 76'	Juanmi 26'; Rodriguez 54' 90'; Soares 79'	
12 July 2015	15:00	A	Leogang	FC Rubin Kazan	1–0		Forsberg 61'		
18 July 2015	19:00	H	Leipzig	Hapoel Tel Aviv F.C.	3–0	5,519	Selke 9'; Ilsanker 45'; Khedira 86'		
29 July 2015	18:00	H	Leipzig	FC Ingolstadt 04	2–0	7,119	Demme 62'; Forsberg 78'		
4 September 2015	16:30	A	Markranstädt	FK Dukla Prague	1–1	725	Bruno 71'	Přikryl 13'	
10 January 2016	15:30	H	Leipzig	FC Eilenburg	13–0	1,012	Sabitzer 2', 31'; Forsberg 8', 13', 25'; Quaschner 38', 42'; Kalmár 64', 75', 90'; Poulsen 85'; Selke 86', 87'		
14 January 2016	16:00	H	Leipzig	Bischofswerdaer FV 08	5–0	432	Halstenberg 35'; Quaschner 45'; Teigl 49'; Poulsen 57', 81'		
20 January 2016	14:30	A	Belek	FC St. Gallen	3–1		Kalmár 48' (pen.); Teigl 50'; Khedira 89'	Aleksić 30' (pen.)	
24 January 2016	14:30	A	Belek	FC Thun	3–1		Forsberg 10'; Sabitzer 41'; Fechner 49'	Zárate 33'	
31 January 2016	13:30	H	Leipzig	FK Teplice	5–0	2,087	Forsberg 43'; Sabitzer 45'; Poulsen 49'; Selke 57', 71' (pen.)		

== 2. Bundesliga ==
=== Fixtures & results ===
Win Draw Loss Postponed

MD	Date Kickoff^{1}	H/A	Opponent	Res. F–A	Att.	Goalscorers		Table			Ref.
MD	Date Kickoff^{1}	H/A	Opponent	Res. F–A	Att.	Leipzig	Opponent	Pos.	Pts.	GD	Ref.
1	25 July 2015; 15:30	A	FSV Frankfurt	1–0	7,021	Sabitzer 55'		3rd	3	+1	
2	3 August 2015; 20:15	H	SpVgg Greuther Fürth	2–2	27,216	Selke 13'; Forsberg 74'	Freis 12'; Berisha 40'	4th	4	+1	
3	15 August 2015; 13:30	A	Eintracht Braunschweig	2–0	21,315	Selke 68'; Forsberg 76'		2nd	7	+3	
4	23 August 2015; 13:30	H	FC St. Pauli	0–1	41,795		Thy 44'	6th	7	+2	
5	28 August 2015; 18:30	A	1. FC Union Berlin	1–1	21,283	Parensen 83' (o.g.)	Brandy 25'	5th	8	+2	
6	11 September 2015; 18:30	H	SC Paderborn	2–0	25,394	Sabitzer 18'; Forsberg 28'		4th	11	+4	
7	18 September 2015; 18:30	A	1. FC Heidenheim	1–1	12,486	Halstenberg 36'	Frahn 62' (pen.)	4th	12	+4	
8	24 September 2015; 20:15	H	SC Freiburg	1–1	25,869	Selke 47'	Petersen 29'	6th	13	+4	
9	27 September 2015; 13:30	A	TSV 1860 München	2–2	21,600	Forsberg 6'; Selke 67'	Wolf 8'; Okotie 78'	6th	14	+4	
10	4 October 2015; 13:30	H	1. FC Nürnberg	3–2	28,987	Kaiser 8' (pen.); Selke 11', 16'	Bulthuis 62'; Füllkrug 76'	5th	17	+5	
11	18 October 2015; 13:30	A	VfL Bochum	1–0	20,704	Sabitzer 65'		3rd	20	+6	
12	23 October 2015; 18:30	H	Fortuna Düsseldorf	2–1	24,095	Forsberg 45+1'; Sabitzer 64'	Haggui 75'	2nd	23	+7	
13	1 November 2015; 13:30	A	SV Sandhausen	2–1	5,811	Kaiser 31' (pen.); Halstenberg 74'	Bouhaddouz 27'	1st	26	+8	
14	8 November 2015; 13:30	H	1. FC Kaiserslautern	0–2	33,598		Klich 37'; Deville 69'	3rd	26	+6	
15	21 November 2015; 13:00	A	Arminia Bielefeld	1–0	18,664	Selke 40'		2nd	29	+7	
16	30 November 2015; 20:15	A	Karlsruher SC	1–0	15,575	Sabitzer 70'		2nd	32	+8	
17	6 December 2015; 13:30	H	MSV Duisburg	4–2	27,477	Poulsen 27', 90'; Quaschner 85'; Nukan 87'	Wolze 18'; Scheidhauer 80'	2nd	35	+10	
18	13 December 2015; 13:30	H	FSV Frankfurt	3–1	19,119	Sabitzer 58', 67'; Kaiser 61'	Perdedaj 61'	1st	38	+12	
19	19 December 2015; 13:00	A	SpVgg Greuther Fürth	2–1	10,070	Poulsen 48'; Ilsanker 90+3'	Röcker 90+1'	1st	41	+13	
20	7 February 2016; 13:30	H	Eintracht Braunschweig	2–0	28,112	Forsberg 24'; Compper 30'		1st	44	+15	
21	12 February 2016; 18:30	A	FC St. Pauli	0–1	25,000		Rzatkowski 8'	1st	44	+14	
22	19 February 2016; 18:30	H	Union Berlin	3–0	30,964	Kaiser 13'; Orban 25'; Poulsen 52'		1st	47	+17	
23	26 February 2016; 18:30	A	SC Paderborn	1–0	8,838	Compper 64'		1st	50	+18	
24	2 March 2016; 17:30	H	1. FC Heidenheim	3–1	22,134	Kaiser 56'; Poulsen 62'; Compper 83'	Leipertz 21'	1st	53	+20	
25	7 March 2016; 20:15	A	SC Freiburg	1–2	23,500	Kaiser 56'	Grifo 10'; Niederlechner 68'	1st	53	+19	
26	13 March 2016; 13:30	H	TSV 1860 München	2–1	25,551	Selke 64'; Klostermann 77'	Mölders 50'	1st	56	+20	
27	20 March 2016; 13:30	A	1. FC Nürnberg	1–3	40,860	Selke 52'	Petrák 64'; Füllkrug 77'; Burgstaller 77'	2nd	56	+18	
28	2 April 2016; 13:00	H	VfL Bochum	3–1	32,244	Kaiser 51'; Bruno 54', 63'	Losilla 88'	2nd	59	+20	
29	11 April 2016; 20:15	A	Fortuna Düsseldorf	3–1	25,474	Poulsen 45+1', 73'; Selke 48'	Fink 15'	2nd	62	+22	
30	15 April 2016; 18:30	H	SV Sandhausen	0–1	30,279		Vollmann 62'	2nd	62	+21	
31	25 April 2016; 20:15	A	1. FC Kaiserslautern	1–1	27,332	Forsberg 56'	Przybylko 83'	2nd	63	+21	
32	29 April 2016; 18:30	H	Arminia Bielefeld	1–1	35,102	Sabitzer 30'	Behrendt 60'	2nd	64	+21	
33	8 May 2016; 15:30	H	Karlsruher SC	2–0	42,559	Forsberg 52'; Halstenberg 87'		2nd	67	+23	
34	15 May 2016; 15:30	A	MSV Duisburg	0–1	27,000		Chanturia 52'	2nd	67	+22	

=== League table ===
Pos	Team	Pld	W	D	L	GF	GA	GD	Pts	Promotion, qualification or relegation
1	SC Freiburg (C, P)	34	22	6	6	75	39	+36	72	Promotion to Bundesliga
2	RB Leipzig (P)	34	20	7	7	54	32	+22	67	Promotion to Bundesliga
3	1. FC Nürnberg	34	19	8	7	68	41	+27	65	Qualification for promotion play-offs
4	FC St. Pauli	34	15	8	11	45	39	+6	53	
5	VfL Bochum	34	13	12	9	56	40	+16	51	

Source: DFB
Rules for classification: 1) Points; 2) Goal difference; 3) Goals scored
(C) Champions; (P) Promoted

=== Results summary ===
Overall								Home						Away					
Pld	W	D	L	GF	GA	GD	Pts	W	D	L	GF	GA	GD	W	D	L	GF	GA	GD
34	20	7	7	54	32	+22	67	11	3	3	32	16	+16	9	4	4	22	16	+6

Last updated: 15 May 2016.
Source: Competitive matches

== DFB-Pokal ==
Win Draw Loss Postponed

RD	Date	Kickoff (Note: Kickoff time in Central European Time/Central European Summer Time.)	Venue	City	Opponent	Result (Note: RB Leipzig's goals first.)	Attendance	Goalscorers		Ref.
RD	Date	Kickoff	Venue	City	Opponent	Result	Attendance	Leipzig	Opponent	Ref.
Round 1	10 August 2015	18:30	A	Osnabrück	VfL Osnabrück	2–0; Awarded (Note: The match was stopped in the 71st minute, with VfL Osnabrück leading 1–0, after the referee was hit by a lighter, and the match was abandoned soon thereafter. The sports court of the DFB, in accordance with section 18, paragraph 4 of the Laws and Rules of Procedure of the DFB, awarded a 0–2 win to RB Leipzig.)				
Round 2	27 October 2015	20:30	A	Unterhaching	SpVgg Unterhaching	0–3	5,000		Einsiedler 5'; Rosenzweig 23'; Steinherr 67'	

== Squad statistics ==
As of 15 May 2016

No.	Pos	Nat	Player	Total		2. Bundesliga		DFB-Pokal	
No.	Pos	Nat	Player	Apps	Goals	Apps	Goals	Apps	Goals
1	GK	(Switzerland) SUI	Fabio Coltorti	21	0	21	0	0	0
2	MF	(Germany) GER	John-Patrick Strauß	0	0	0	0	0	0
3	DF	(Germany) GER	Anthony Jung	23	0	22	0	1	0
4	DF	(Hungary) HUN	Willi Orbán	32	1	32	1	0	0
5	DF	(Turkey) TUR	Atınç Nukan	13	1	12	1	1	0
6	MF	(Germany) GER	Rani Khedira	20	0	19	0	1	0
7	FW	(Austria) AUT	Marcel Sabitzer	32	8	32	8	0	0
9	FW	(Denmark) DEN	Yussuf Poulsen	33	7	32	7	1	0
12	MF	(Sweden) SWE	Emil Forsberg	32	8	32	8	0	0
13	MF	(Austria) AUT	Stefan Ilsanker	27	1	26	1	1	0
14	MF	(Belgium) BEL	Massimo Bruno	25	2	24	2	1	0
15	FW	(Germany) GER	Agyemang Diawusie	0	0	0	0	0	0
16	DF	(Germany) GER	Lukas Klostermann	30	1	30	1	0	0
17	FW	(Germany) GER	Nils Quaschner	20	1	19	1	1	0
18	FW	(United States) USA	Terrence Boyd	0	0	0	0	0	0
20	MF	(Germany) GER	Ken Gipson	2	0	2	0	0	0
21	DF	(Russia) RUS	Dmitri Skopintsev	0	0	0	0	0	0
22	GK	(Germany) GER	Benjamin Bellot	0	0	0	0	0	0
23	DF	(Germany) GER	Marcel Halstenberg	25	3	24	3	1	0
24	MF	(Germany) GER	Dominik Kaiser	31	7	30	7	1	0
25	MF	(Austria) AUT	Stefan Hierländer	1	0	1	0	0	0
27	FW	(Germany) GER	Davie Selke	31	10	30	10	1	0
31	MF	(Germany) GER	Diego Demme	28	0	28	0	0	0
32	GK	(Hungary) HUN	Péter Gulácsi	15	0	14	0	1	0
33	DF	(Germany) GER	Marvin Compper	23	3	23	3	0	0
39	MF	(Austria) AUT	Georg Teigl	12	0	11	0	1	0
40	MF	(Germany) GER	Idrissa Touré	1	0	1	0	0	0
Players who left the club during the 2015–16 season
8	DF	(Germany) GER	Tim Sebastian	7	0	6	0	1	0
19	MF	(Hungary) HUN	Zsolt Kalmár (on loan to FSV Frankfurt)	4	0	4	0	0	0
