= Diego Demme =

German footballer (born 1991)

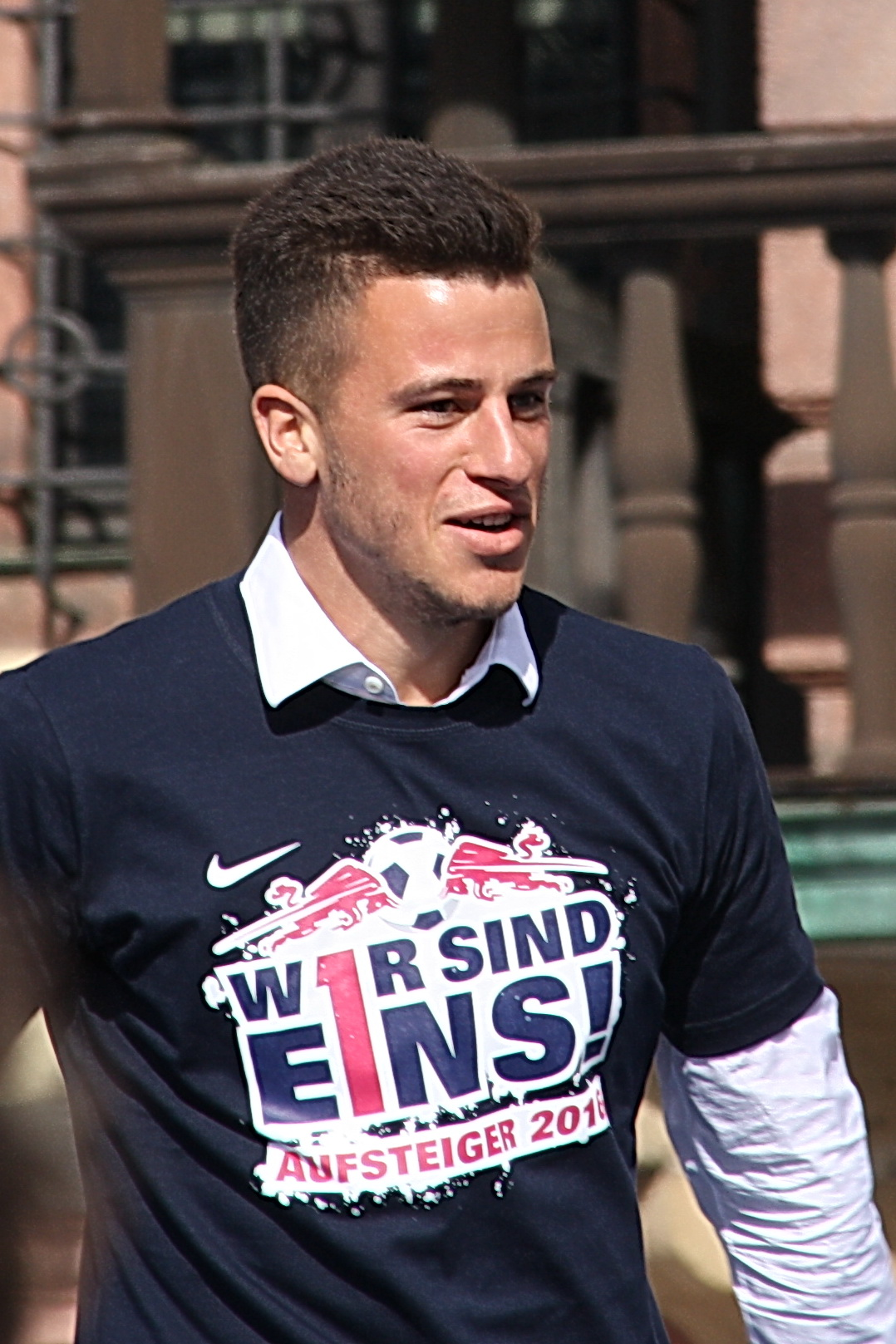
- Demme celebrating promotion to the Bundesliga with RB Leipzig in 2016

Personal information
- Full name: Diego Demme
- Date of birth: 21 November 1991 (age 34)
- Place of birth: Herford, Germany
- Height: 1.72 m (5 ft 8 in)
- Position: Defensive midfielder

Youth career
- 2008–2010: Arminia Bielefeld

Senior career*
Years	Team	Apps	(Gls)
2010–2012	Arminia Bielefeld	20	(0)
2012–2014	SC Paderborn	58	(0)
2014–2020	RB Leipzig	179	(1)
2020–2024	Napoli	67	(4)
2024–2026	Hertha BSC	35	(0)

International career
2017	Germany	1	(0)
- * Club domestic league appearances and goals as of 18 May 2026

Diego Demme (born 21 November 1991) is a German former professional footballer who played as a defensive midfielder.

== Club career ==
=== Arminia Bielefeld ===
Born in Herford, Germany, Demme began playing football at a young age and played for various youth teams, such as, SpVg Hiddenhausen, SV Sundern, SV Enger-Westerenger and JSG Kirchlengern Stift Quernheim before joining Arminia Bielefeld, where he started off his professional career. He then signed a contract in 2008.

Having progressed through the academy and Arminia Bielefeld II, Demme was called up to the first team in early–December for the first time and made his debut for the first team, starting the whole game, in a 4–1 loss against Greuther Fürth on 4 December 2010. After making his debut for the club, his performance was praised by the local German media, Neue Westfälische. Following this, Demme had a handful of first team football until February when he found himself behind the pecking order from competitions in the midfield position. Despite spending time on the bench, in numbers of games towards the end of the 2010–11 season, Demme went on to make 10 appearances in all competitions. At the end of the 2010–11 season, he signed a one–year contract extension with the club.

However, at the start of the 2011–12 season, Demme was plagued by injuries. It wasn't until on 8 August 2011 when he made his first appearance of the season, making his first start, in a 1–0 loss against VfR Aalen. As the season goes by, Demme continued to plagued by injuries and struggled in the first team, being placed on the substitute bench. After he stayed in the club for three years, he moved to SC Paderborn 07. By the time of his departure, he made 23 appearances in all competitions.

=== SC Paderborn ===
It was announced on 9 January 2012 that Demme moved to 2. Bundesliga side SC Paderborn, signing a two–year contract that keep him until 2014 and was given a number 4 shirt. The transfer reportedly cost for €25,000. The club previously keen on signing Demme last-May before signing a contract.

Demme made his SC Paderborn 07 debut, coming on as a second–half substitute, in a 3–2 win over 1. FC Union Berlin on 3 February 2012. Later in the 2011–12 season, Demme established himself in the first team, playing in either left–back or right–back position. At the end of the season, he went on to make a total of 12 appearances in all competitions.

In the 2012–13 season, Demme started out his season at the club, playing in the midfield position. Although he suffered an injury during a 2–1 loss against Eintracht Braunschweig on 24 August 2012, Demme was then sent–off early in the second–half for a foul on Jan Hochscheidt, in a 1–0 win over Erzgebirge Aue on 16 September 2012. For his sending off against Erzgebirge Aue, he served a three match ban. After his return from suspension against FSV Frankfurt on 5 October 2012, Demme's return was short–lived when he suffered ankle injury in early–November that kept him out for two weeks. After his return from ankle injury against VfR Aalen on 17 November 2012, Demme then play in the right–back position in early–December following an injury of Jens Wemmer. But in early–March, he returned to playing in the defensive midfield position for the rest of the season. With his good performance at the club, they were keen on extending his contract, as it's set to end at the end of the 2013–14 season. At the end of the 2012–13 season, Demme went on to make a total of 30 appearances in all competitions.

In the 2013–14 season, Demme, once again, started out in the midfield position despite competing with Manuel Zeitz. He started every match since the start of the season until he was suspended in late–September following his bad behaviour against 1. FC Saarbrücken in the second round of DFB Pokal. But he returned to the first team from suspension on 4 October 2013, coming on as a second–half substitute, in a 2–1 win over FC St. Pauli; a game that saw him sustained ankle injury, causing him to miss one game. After his return from injury, Demme later regained his first place in the midfield position, making the total of 19 appearances for the side. Following his departure in January, the club were later promoted to the Bundesliga later in the 2013–14 season.

=== RB Leipzig ===
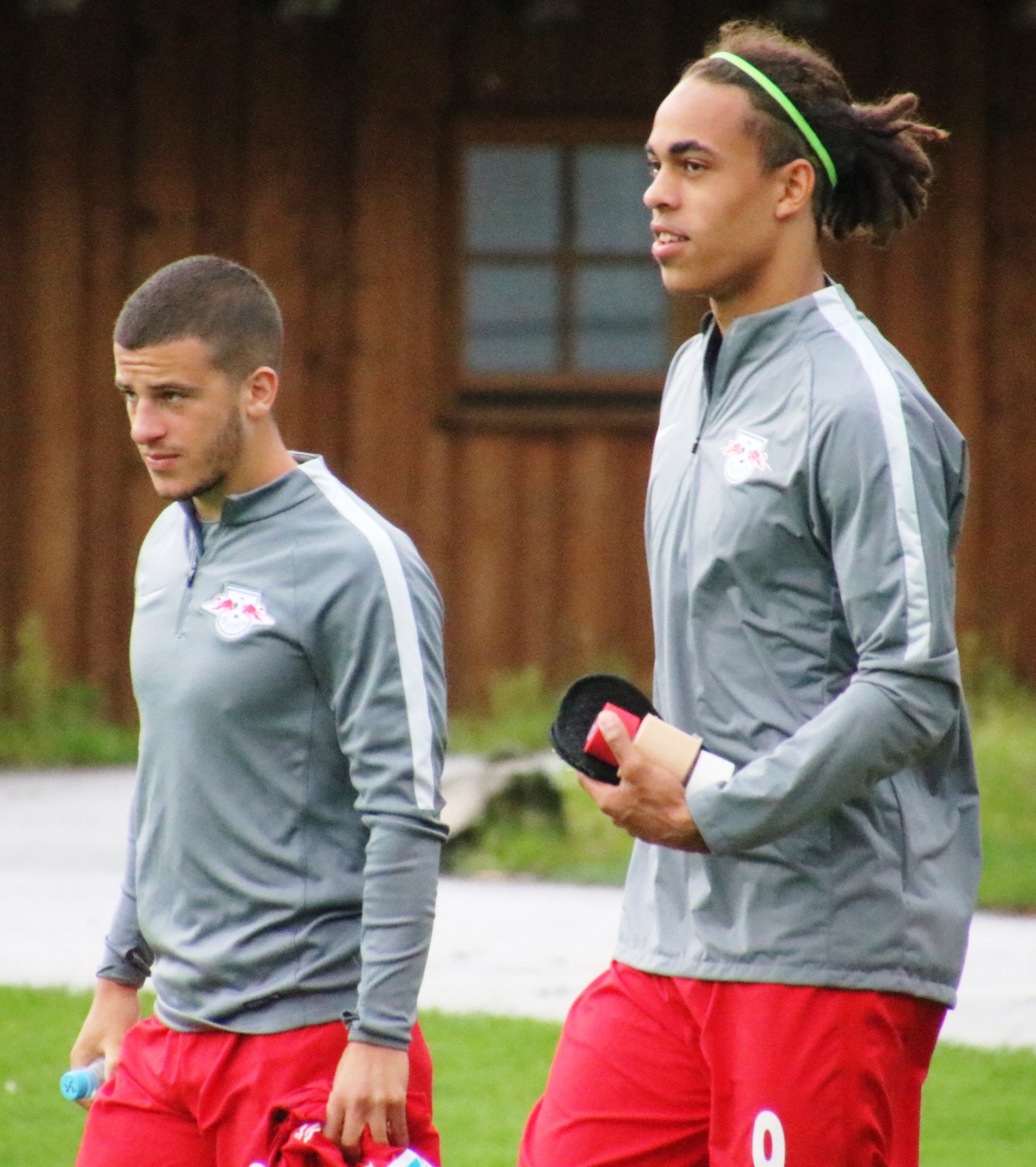
Demme pictured with Yussuf Poulsen in a friendly match against FC Liefering on 9 August 2016.

It was announced on 7 January 2014 that Demme signed for 3. Liga side RB Leipzig, signing a contract, keeping him until 2018. The transfer move cost €350,000 to sign Demme.

Demme made his RB Leipzig debut, starting the whole game, in a 1–0 loss against Wacker Burghausen on 25 January 2014. The following match against MSV Duisburg on 1 February 2014 saw Demme setting up a goal for Daniel Frahn, in a 2–1 loss. Since making his debut for the club, Demme quickly established himself in the first team towards the end of the season, at the midfield position. Despite missing out one game, due to injury, he helped the club reach promotion to 2. Bundesliga after beating 1. FC Saarbrücken 5–1 on 3 May 2014, as he made 16 appearances for the side.

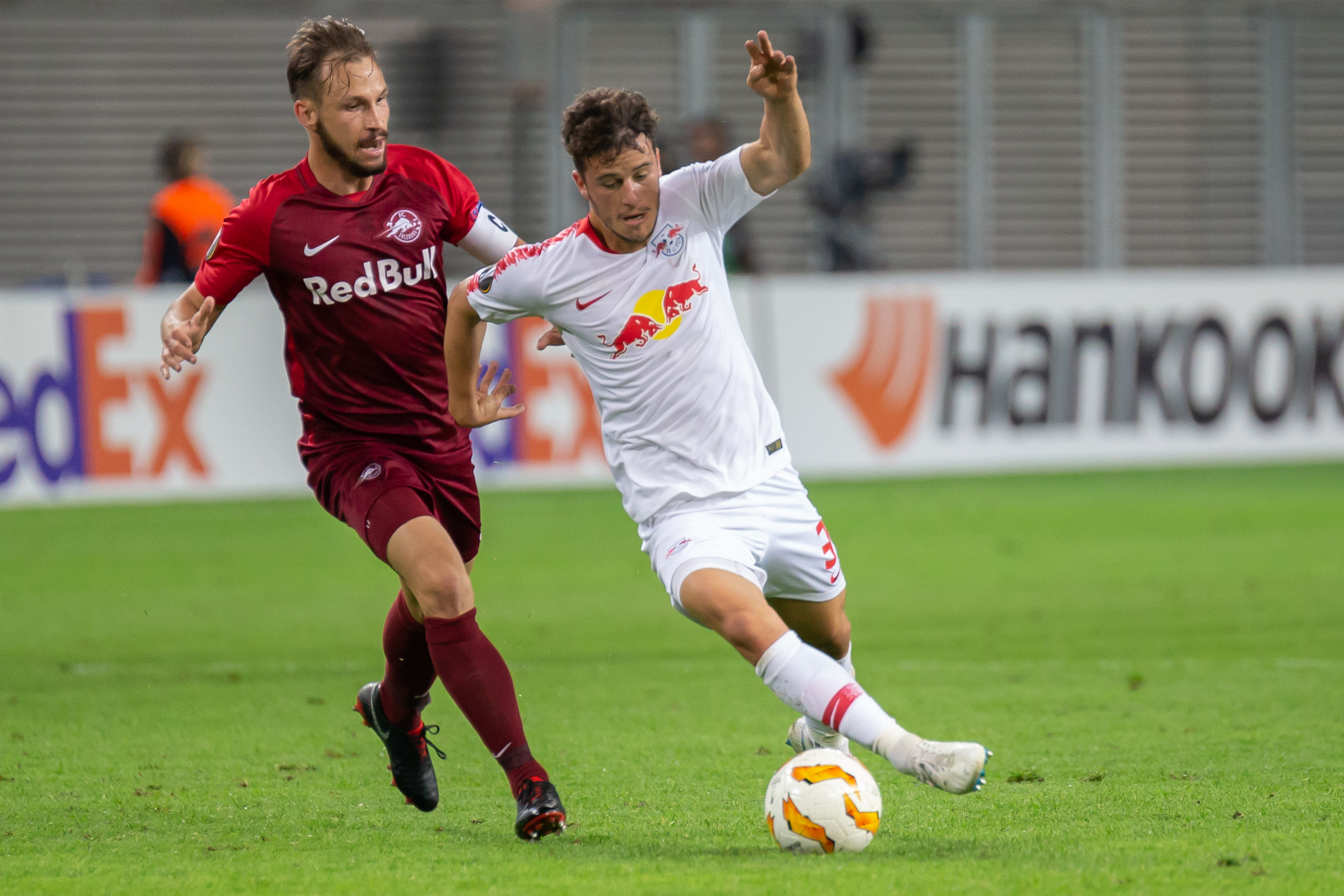
Demme fighting for a ball against FC Red Bull Salzburg's Andreas Ulmer during a UEFA Europa League match in September 2018.

At the start of the 2014–15 season, Demme continued to regain his first team place, as he played in midfield positions. He then set up a goal for Georg Teigl, who scored twice during the game, in a 2–2 draw against Fortuna Düsseldorf on 18 September 2014. Demme started every match since the start of the season until he appeared on the substitute bench three times in early–February. Demme returned to the first team and regained his place towards the end of the season. Despite some minor setbacks during the 2014–15 season, Demme went on to make a total of 33 appearances in all competitions.

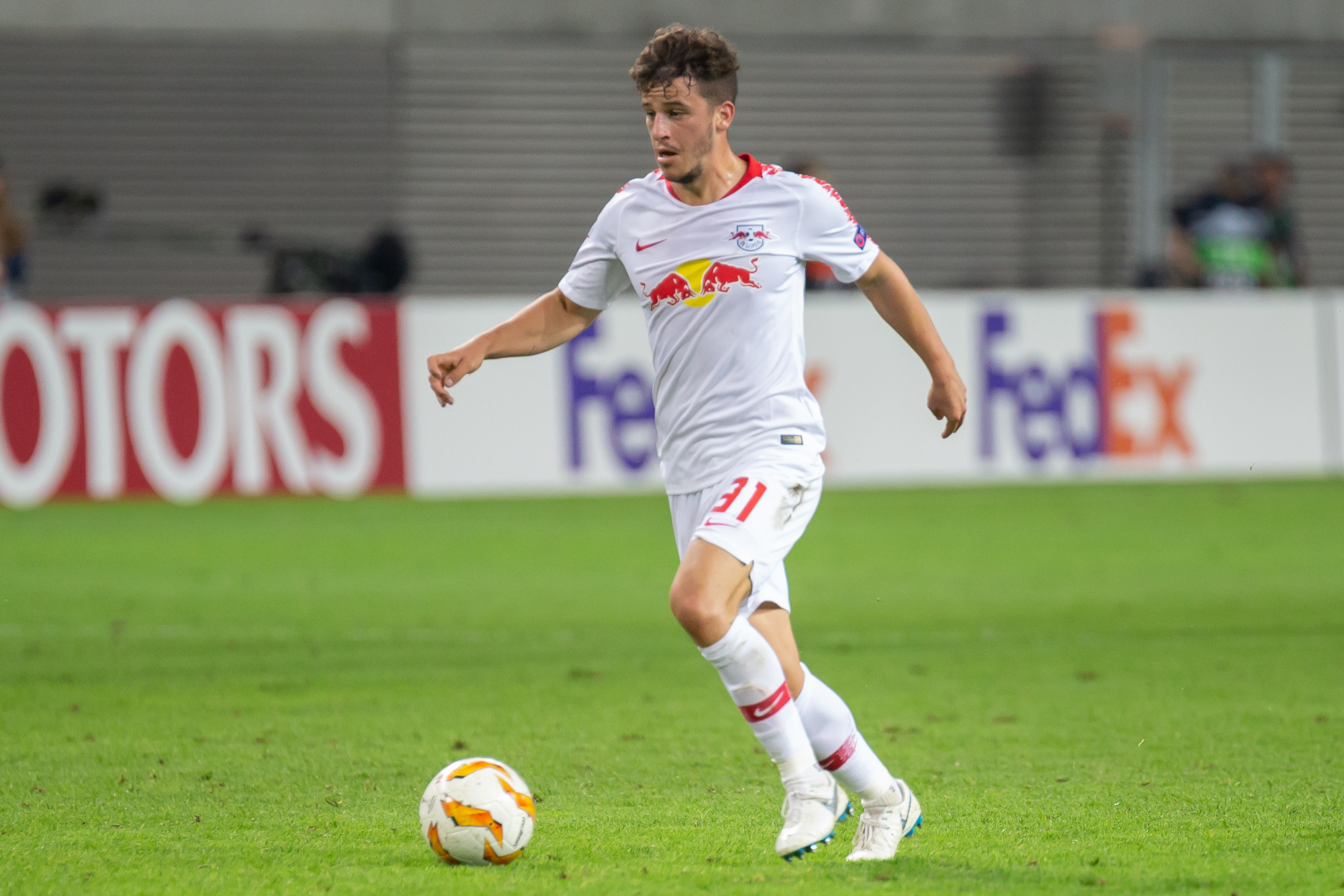
Demme dribbling the ball during a UEFA Europa League match against FC Red Bull Salzburg in September 2018.

At the start of the 2015–16 season, however, Demme suffered an injury during training and missed the opening game of the season. He then made his return from injury in a follow-up match against Greuther Fürth on 3 August 2015, coming on as a late substitute, in a 2–2 draw. After appearing on the substitute bench in a number of matches, Demme soon regained his first team place, due to the club's shortage of midfielders. He then established himself in the starting eleven for the side, in the midfield position and helped the club gain promotion to the Bundesliga after beating Karlsruher SC 2–0 on 8 May 2016. Despite being sidelined during the 2015–16 season, Demme went on to make a total of 28 appearances in all competitions.

After the club was promoted to the Bundesliga to play in the 2016–17 Bundesliga, Demme played an important role in the first two matches for the side assisting a goal for Dominik Kaiser in two separate matches against Dynamo Dresden in the first round of DFB–Pokal and 1899 Hoffenheim in the league. Demme then continued to regain his first team place in the defensive midfield position throughout the season. His performance at the club earned praise from Manager Ralph Hasenhüttl. Soon after, the club began negotiating a new contract with Demme. It took two months for Demme to sign a contract extension, keeping him until 2021. Demme then captained RB Leipzig for the first time in his career in absence of Kaiser on 19 February 2017, in a 2–1 win over Borussia Mönchengladbach. It wasn't until 15 April 2017 he scored his first RB Leipzig goal, in a 4–0 win over SC Freiburg. During the match, Demme lost a tooth following a clash with opposition's player, Nicolas Höfler. Demme later captained for the side for the remaining matches of the season. Despite suffering from injuries during the 2016–17 season, Demme went on to make a total of 33 appearances and scoring once in all competitions.

Ahead of the 2017–18 season, Demme and Willi Orban were among two candidates to be given a captain role by Manager Ralph Hasenhüttl, succeeding Kaiser. Eventually, the captaincy went to Orban. Demme suffered an injury at training after colliding with teammate Naby Keïta in late–July. After being sidelined with an injury for weeks, it wasn't until 27 August 2017 he made his first appearance of the season since returning from injury, in a 4–1 win over SC Freiburg. After the match, Manager Hasenhüttl praised Demme's return, saying: "He was very active today, always wanted to push things forward and is enormously important with his view of the pitch, because he tries to put the ball in the front half. A great comeback." Upon returning from injury, Demme regained his first team place in the defensive midfield position. He then played his first UEFA Champions League match, starting the whole game, in a 1–1 draw against AS Monaco on Matchday 1 of the Group Stage. In the absence of Orban, Demme captained the side for the first time this season on 4 November 2017, in a 2–1 win over Hannover 96. He then played a vital role against 1. FSV Mainz 05 on 9 December 2017 setting up two goals, in a 2–2 draw. He went on to captain the side five more times later in the 2017–18 season in the absence of Orban and contributed three wins, including against Bayern Munich and Hertha BSC. At the end of the 2017–18 season, he had made forty–one appearances in all competitions.

The 2018–19 season saw the returning management of Ralf Rangnick and made a decision to rotate captaincy given to different players. Demme captained the side in the first two league matches of the season before returning it back to Orban. Despite this, he was appointed as the club's vice–captain instead, often wearing the armband when Orban was not in the starting eleven squad. Demme continued to regain his first team place at RB Leipzig, playing in the defensive position. Despite being sidelined in the first team on three occasions during the 2018–19 season, he went on to make thirty–nine appearances in all competitions.

=== Napoli ===
On 11 January 2020, RB Leipzig announced that Demme agreed to a transfer to Serie A club Napoli. Demme scored his debut goal for Napoli on 3 February, in a 4–2 away victory against Sampdoria.

=== Hertha ===
On 6 July 2024, Demme signed a two-year contract with Hertha BSC in 2. Bundesliga.

=== Retirement ===
On 24 September 2026, Demme announced his retirement from professional football.

== International career ==
Although Demme is eligible to play for Germany and Italy, he said: "If you come first, I'll take it right away."

Demme was first called up to the Germany national team in 2017, for the friendly against Denmark on 6 June 2017, for the 2018 World Cup qualification match against San Marino on 10 June 2017, in which he made his international debut, and for the Confederations Cup, but withdrew from the squad ahead of the tournament due to a back injury.

== Personal life ==
Born in Herford, Germany, Demme was born to an Italian father and a German mother, making him German-Italian. Demme's father was a huge fan of Diego Maradona, and named his son after him. Because of his Italian father, he has an Italian passport.

Demme said about his fitness, quoting: "In the past, I ate a lot of meat. But now I just feel better, I regenerate faster. The body is no longer so acidified, I have hardly any muscular problems." Growing up, Demme said he idolised Gennaro Gattuso. In December 2018, Demme married his long–term girlfriend, Alina. The couple has two daughters Gia and Ellie.

== Career statistics ==
=== Club ===
As of match played 4 July 2025

Appearances and goals by club, season and competition
Club	Season	League			National cup (Note: Includes DFB-Pokal, Coppa Italia)		Europe		Other		Total	
Club	Season	Division	Apps	Goals	Apps	Goals	Apps	Goals	Apps	Goals	Apps	Goals
Arminia Bielefeld II	2010–11	Regionalliga West	17	0	—		—		—		17	0
Arminia Bielefeld	2010–11	2. Bundesliga	10	0	0	0	—		—		10	0
Arminia Bielefeld	2011–12	3. Liga	10	0	1	0	—		—		11	0
Arminia Bielefeld	Total		20	0	1	0	—		—		21	0
SC Paderborn	2011–12	2. Bundesliga	12	0	1	0	—		—		13	0
SC Paderborn	2012–13	2. Bundesliga	29	0	2	0	—		—		31	0
SC Paderborn	2013–14	2. Bundesliga	17	0	0	0	—		—		17	0
SC Paderborn	Total		58	0	3	0	—		—		61	0
RB Leipzig	2013–14	3. Liga	16	0	0	0	—		—		16	0
RB Leipzig	2014–15	2. Bundesliga	30	0	3	0	—		—		33	0
RB Leipzig	2015–16	2. Bundesliga	28	0	0	0	—		—		28	0
RB Leipzig	2016–17	Bundesliga	32	1	1	0	—		—		33	1
RB Leipzig	2017–18	Bundesliga	30	0	1	0	10 (Note: Appearances in UEFA Champions League)	0	—		41	0
RB Leipzig	2018–19	Bundesliga	26	0	5	0	8 (Note: Appearances in UEFA Europa League)	0	—		39	0
RB Leipzig	2019–20	Bundesliga	17	0	2	0	5	1	—		24	1
RB Leipzig	Total		179	1	12	0	23	1	—		214	2
Napoli	2019–20	Serie A	15	1	5	0	2	0	—		22	1
Napoli	2020–21	Serie A	24	2	4	0	6	1	1 (Note: Appearance in Supercoppa Italiana)	0	35	3
Napoli	2021–22	Serie A	19	1	1	0	5	0	—		25	1
Napoli	2022–23	Serie A	7	0	0	0	0	0	—		7	0
Napoli	2023–24	Serie A	2	0	1	0	0	0	0	0	3	0
Napoli	Total		67	4	11	0	13	1	1	0	92	5
Hertha BSC	2024–25	2. Bundesliga	22	0	2	0	—		—		24	0
Career total			363	5	29	0	36	2	1	0	429	7

=== International ===
Appearances and goals by national team and year
National team	Year	Apps	Goals
Germany	2017	1	0
Total		1	0

== Honours ==
Napoli

- Serie A: 2022–23
- Coppa Italia: 2019–20
