= Juri Judt =

German footballer

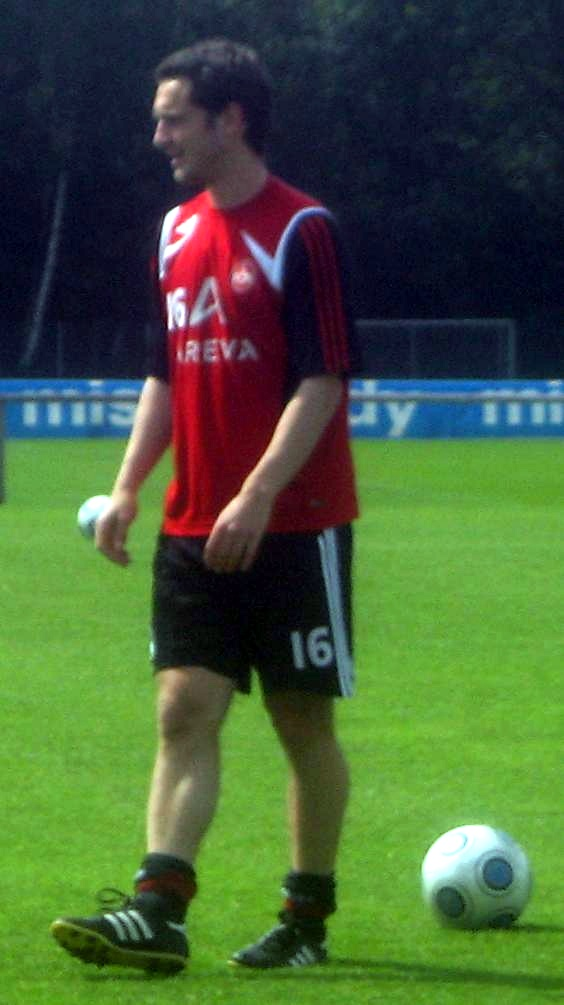
- Judt in 2009

Personal information
- Date of birth: 24 July 1986 (age 40)
- Place of birth: Karaganda, Soviet Union
- Height: 1.73 m (5 ft 8 in)
- Positions: Defensive midfielder; right-back

Youth career
- –1999: FC Bayern Kickers Nürnberg
- 1999–2005: Greuther Fürth

Senior career*
Years	Team	Apps	(Gls)
2005–2008	Greuther Fürth	76	(0)
2008–2012	1. FC Nürnberg	65	(0)
2012–2013	RB Leipzig	26	(1)
2014	1. FC Saarbrücken	5	(0)
2014–2016	Rot-Weiß Erfurt	52	(0)
2016	SV Seligenporten	3	(0)
Total		237	(1)

International career
2007	Germany U21	4	(0)
- * Club domestic league appearances and goals

Juri Judt (born 24 July 1986) is a German former professional footballer who played as a defensive midfielder or right-back.

== Club career ==
Judt was born in Karaganda in the former Soviet Union.

In April 2016, with his Rot-Weiß Erfurt contract running out, he announced he would retire from professional football at the end of the season. At the beginning of the 2016–17 season, he played a few matches for lower league side SV Seligenporten but stopped playing in August.

== International career ==
Judt represented the Germany national under-21 football team on four occasions.
