= Patrick Koronkiewicz =

German footballer

Personal information
- Date of birth: 13 March 1991 (age 35)
- Place of birth: Bonn, Germany
- Height: 1.85 m (6 ft 1 in)
- Position: Right-back

Youth career
- –2004: FC 08 Düren-Niederau
- 2004–2010: Bayer Leverkusen

Senior career*
Years	Team	Apps	(Gls)
2010–2012	Bayer Leverkusen II	55	(1)
2012–2013	RB Leipzig	6	(0)
2013	RB Leipzig II	4	(1)
2013–2014	Sportfreunde Siegen	28	(3)
2014–2025	Viktoria Köln	250	(13)

International career
2008–2009	Germany U18	8	(0)
2009–2010	Germany U19	8	(0)
2010–2011	Germany U20	2	(0)
- * Club domestic league appearances and goals as of 24 May 2025

Patrick Koronkiewicz (born 13 March 1991) is a German professional footballer who plays as a right-back.

== Career ==
Koronkiewicz made his debut in the 3. Liga for Viktoria Köln on 3 August 2019, starting in the away match against Bayern Munich II. He assisted Mike Wunderlich for Köln's second goal, with the match finishing as a 5–2 win.
