= Christian Mauersberger =

German footballer

Personal information
- Date of birth: 20 April 1995 (age 31)
- Place of birth: Bad Soden-Salmünster, Germany
- Height: 1.70 m (5 ft 7 in)
- Position: Right midfielder

Team information
- Current team: Stuttgarter Kickers
- Number: 38

Youth career
- 2000–2007: VfB Annaberg
- 2007–2013: Chemnitzer FC

Senior career*
Years	Team	Apps	(Gls)
2013–2015	Chemnitzer FC II	20	(5)
2013–2015	Chemnitzer FC	30	(2)
2015–2017	FC Schalke 04 II	43	(4)
2017–2018	FSV Zwickau	13	(1)
2018–2020	Rielasingen-Arlen	20	(7)
2020–2023	SGV Freiberg	69	(11)
2023–	Stuttgarter Kickers	77	(12)

International career
2009	Germany U-15	1	(0)
2011–2012	Germany U-17	10	(0)
2013	Germany U-18	2	(0)
2013	Germany U-19	1	(1)
- * Club domestic league appearances and goals as of 24 September 2026

Christian Mauersberger (born 20 April 1995) is a German footballer who plays as a midfielder for Stuttgarter Kickers in Regionalliga Südwest.

== Career ==
=== Chemnitzer FC ===
Mauersberger came through Chemnitzer FC's youth team, and was promoted to the first team in 2013. He made his 3. Liga debut on the opening day of the 2013–14 season, as a substitute for Sascha Pfeffer in a 3–0 defeat to VfL Osnabrück. He scored his first competitive goal for the club on 26 October 2013 in a 3–1 home victory over RB Leipzig. His goal, scored in the 17th minute, made the score 1–0 to Chemnitzer.

=== FC Schalke II ===
In June 2016, Mauersberger moved to Regionalliga club Schalke II. He made his competitive debut for the club on 2 August 2015 in a 2–0 away defeat to Sportfreunde Lotte. He scored his first competitive goal for the club on 9 April 2016 in a 2–0 home victory over FC Wegberg-Beeck. His goal, scored in the 46th minute, made the score 2–0 to Schalke II.

=== FSV Zwickau ===
In May 2017, Mauersberger joined 3. Liga side FSV Zwickau. He made his competitive debut for the club on 4 August 2017 in a 1–1 home draw with Rot-Weiß Erfurt, coming on as a sub for Robert Koch in the 76th minute. He scored his first competitive goal for the club on 15 April 2018 in a 2–1 away defeat to Unterhaching. His goal, assisted by Nils Miatke, came in the 19th minute. At the end of the 2017–18 season, Mauersberger announced his retirement, electing to pursue a career in religion.

=== Stuttgarter Kickers ===
On 13 June 2023, Stuttgarter Kickers announced the signing of Mauersberger.

=== Club ===
Club performance			League		Cup		Continental		Other		Total	
Club	League	Season	App.	Goals	App.	Goals	App.	Goals	App.	Goals	App.	Goals
Germany			League		DFB-Pokal		Europe		Other		Total	
Chemnitzer FC II	NOFV-Oberliga Süd	2013–14	5	3	0	0	0	0	0	0	5	3
Chemnitzer FC II	NOFV-Oberliga Süd	2014–15	15	2	0	0	0	0	0	0	15	2
Chemnitzer FC	3. Liga	2013–14	17	1	0	0	0	0	0	0	17	1
Chemnitzer FC	3. Liga	2014–15	13	1	0	0	0	0	0	0	13	1
FC Schalke 04 II	Regionalliga West	2015–16	43	4	0	0	0	0	0	0	43	4
FSV Zwickau	3.Liga	2017–18	6	0	0	0	0	0	1	0	7	0
Total			99	11	0	0	0	0	1	0	100	11
Last updated: 23 December 2017
