= Carsten Kammlott =

German footballer

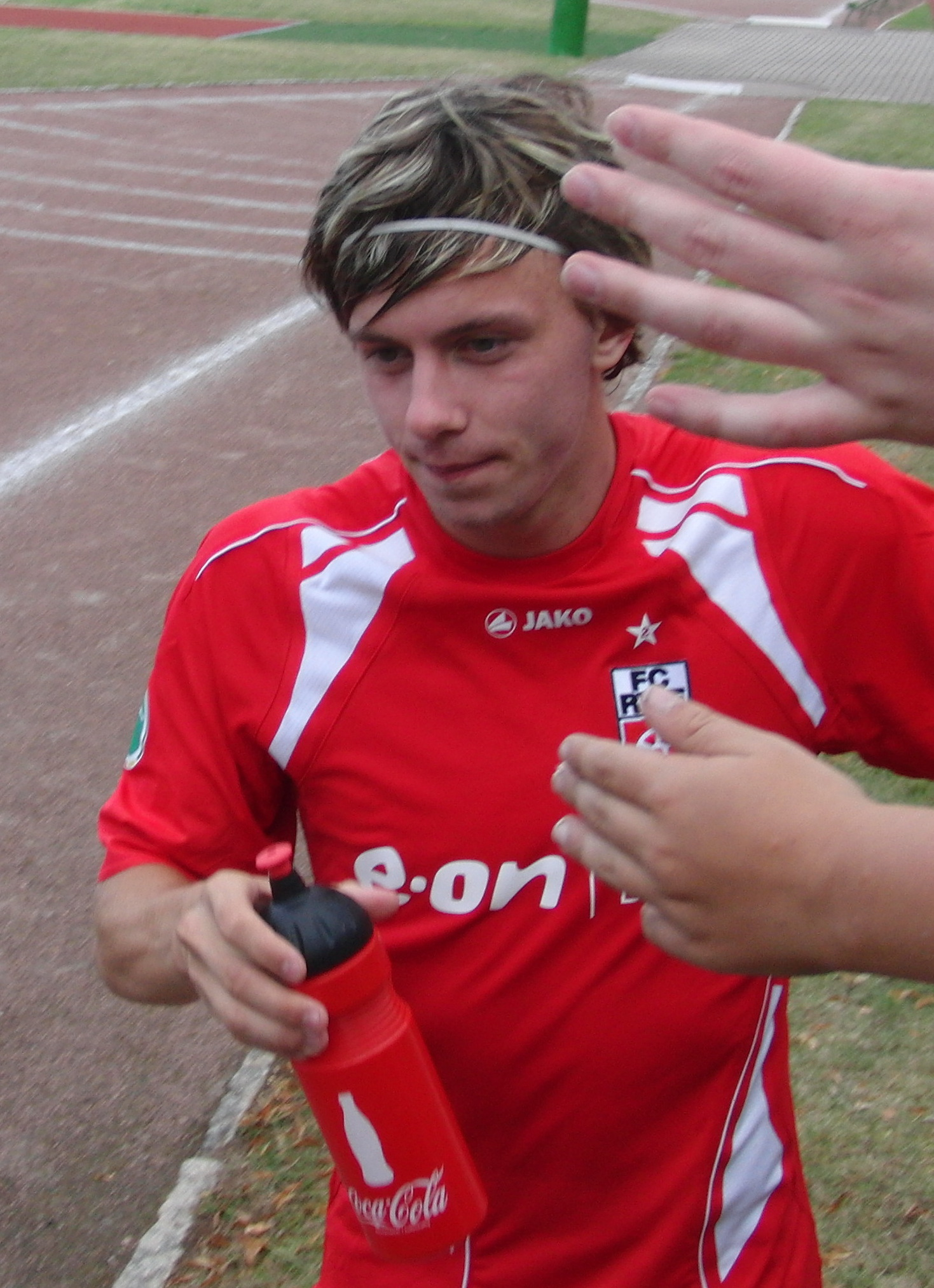
- Kammlott in 2009

Personal information
- Date of birth: 28 February 1990 (age 36)
- Place of birth: Bad Frankenhausen, East Germany
- Height: 1.77 m (5 ft 10 in)
- Position: Forward

Youth career
- SV Fortuna Gehofen
- Rot-Weiß Erfurt

Senior career*
Years	Team	Apps	(Gls)
2008–2010	Rot-Weiß Erfurt	39	(13)
2010–2014	RB Leipzig	85	(10)
2014–2018	Rot-Weiß Erfurt	136	(42)
2018–2020	Wacker Nordhausen	50	(21)

International career
2010	Germany U-20	1	(0)
- * Club domestic league appearances and goals as of 1 August 2020

Carsten Kammlott (born 28 February 1990) is a German professional footballer who plays as a forward.
