= Bastian Schulz =

German footballer

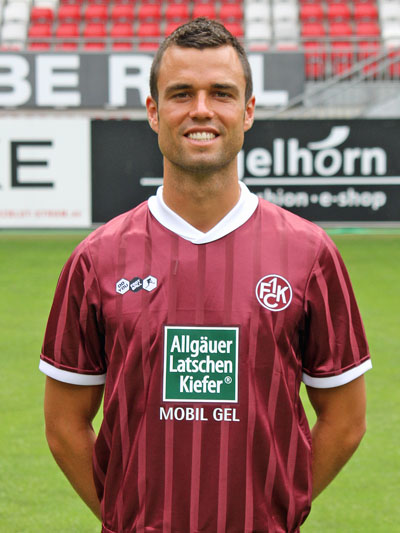

Personal information
- Date of birth: 10 July 1985 (age 41)
- Place of birth: Hanover, West Germany
- Height: 1.82 m (6 ft 0 in)
- Position: Midfielder

Youth career
- 1997–2004: Hannover 96

Senior career*
Years	Team	Apps	(Gls)
2004–2008	Hannover 96 II	60	(8)
2008–2009	Hannover 96	23	(1)
2009–2011	1. FC Kaiserslautern	19	(1)
2011–2013	RB Leipzig	63	(11)
2014–2016	VfL Wolfsburg II	76	(22)
2016–2018	VfL Osnabrück	28	(4)
Total		269	(47)
- * Club domestic league appearances and goals

Bastian Schulz (born 10 July 1985) is a German former footballer.

== Career ==
Schulz began his career with Hannover 96 in summer 1997 in the youth side and was promoted to the first team in June 2008.

On 20 June 2009, he announced his departure from Hannover 96 after twelve years and signed a three-year contract with 1. FC Kaiserslautern. After two seasons with Kaiserslautern, Schulz left the Bundesliga and joined RB Leipzig.

He announced his retirement on 4 January 2018 after playing for VfL Osnabrück since 2016.
