= Niklas Hoheneder =

Austrian footballer (born 1986)

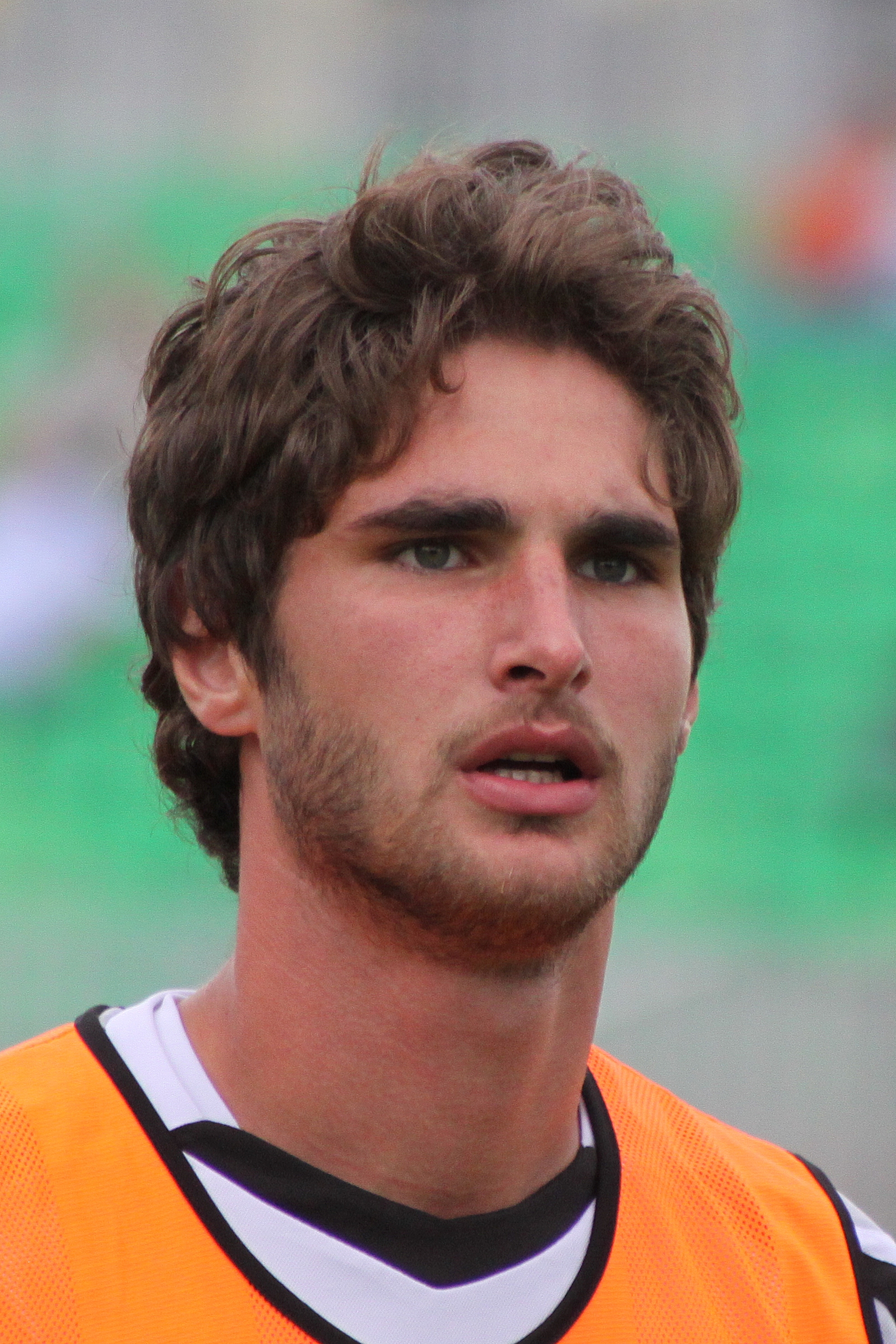
- Hoheneder in 2009

Personal information
- Date of birth: 17 August 1986 (age 40)
- Place of birth: Linz, Austria
- Height: 1.90 m (6 ft 3 in)
- Position: Defender

Team information
- Current team: Chemnitzer FC (assistant coach)

Youth career
- 1992–1995: Union Lembach
- 1995–1998: SK VÖEST Linz
- 1998–2003: LASK Linz

Senior career*
Years	Team	Apps	(Gls)
2003–2009	LASK Linz	136	(6)
2009–2011	Sparta Prague	31	(0)
2011	→ Austria Wien (loan)	6	(0)
2011–2012	Karlsruher SC	11	(0)
2012–2015	RB Leipzig	82	(5)
2015–2016	SC Paderborn 07	24	(1)
2016–2018	Holstein Kiel	35	(0)
2018–2021	Chemnitzer FC	79	(5)

International career
2006–2007	Austria U19	7	(0)
2007–2008	Austria U21	17	(1)

Managerial career
- 2021–: Chemnitzer FC (assistant)
- * Club domestic league appearances and goals

Niklas Hoheneder (born 17 August 1986) is an Austrian football coach and a former defender. He is an assistant coach of Chemnitzer FC. He previously played for LASK Linz, Sparta Prague, Austria Wien, Karlsruher SC, RB Leipzig, SC Paderborn 07, and Holstein Kiel.

== Career ==
Hoheneder was born in Linz, Austria. He started his career at LASK Linz and made around 120 appearances for the club between 2005 and 2009.

He joined Sparta Prague in the summer of 2009. In January 2011, Hoheneder joined Austria Wien on a half-season loan, with Wien having the option to sign him permanently. After making 6 appearances in the Austrian Bundesliga, Hohender did not join Austria Wien permanently and returned to parent club Sparta Prague.

Having made 47 appearances in all competitions for Sparta Prague, in June 2011, 2. Bundesliga side Karlsruher SC announced the signing of Hoheneder from Sparta Prague on a two-year contract. During the first half of the 2011–12 season, Hoheneder made 13 appearances in the 2. Bundesliga, though did not score.

He joined RB Leipzig on 31 January 2012 on a one-and-a-half-year contract. Hoheneder made 11 appearances for RB Leipzig during the 2011–12 season, the majority of which as a substitute, scoring once. In April 2013, he signed a two-year contract extension with RB Leipzig, keeping him at the club until 30 June 2015. Hoheneder was a regular player for RB Leipzig in the 2012–13 and the 2013–14 seasonbut made just 10 appearances for RB Leipzig during the 2014–15 season.

After his contract at RB Leipzig expired, Hoheneder joined SC Paderborn 07 on a two-year contract. He was a regular player at Paderborn, making 24 appearances and scoring 1 goal in the 2. Bundesliga.

In the summer of 2016, Hoheneder joined 3. Liga side Holstein Kiel on a two-year contract. He suffered a ligament injury in December 2016 and was injured for around a month as a result. He made 28 appearances for Kiel in the 2016–17 season as part of the Holstein Kiel team that was promoted to the 2. Bundesliga. He made just 7 appearances during the 2017–18 season and left Kiel in the summer of 2018.

On 6 July 2018, Höheneder signed for Regionalliga Nordost club Chemnitzer FC. He made 32 appearances for Chemnitz, scoring twice, as Chemnitz was promoted to the 3. Liga.
