= Tobias Willers =

German footballer (born 1987)

Personal information
- Date of birth: 21 April 1987 (age 39)
- Place of birth: Hasede, West Germany
- Height: 1.92 m (6 ft 4 in)
- Position: Centre-back

Youth career
- TuS Hasede
- –2002: VfB Borussia Hildesheim
- 2002–2005: Hannover 96

Senior career*
Years	Team	Apps	(Gls)
2005–2007	Hannover 96 II	59	(4)
2006–2007	Hannover 96	0	(0)
2007–2008	KSV Hessen Kassel	29	(1)
2008–2009	Wuppertaler SV Borussia	27	(1)
2009–2011	Sportfreunde Lotte	49	(8)
2011–2012	Rot-Weiss Oberhausen	34	(3)
2012–2013	Sportfreunde Lotte	36	(8)
2013–2014	RB Leipzig	18	(1)
2014–2017	VfL Osnabrück	95	(4)
2017–2020	Viktoria Köln	74	(6)
- * Club domestic league appearances and goals

Tobias Willers (born 21 April 1987) is a German football official and a former player. He works as a scout for Bayern Munich.

== Career ==
In June 2013, Willers signed for 3. Liga side RB Leipzig. He moved to VfL Osnabrück on 1 September 2014.

Before signing for Viktoria Köln in November 2017 he was suspended from professional football in Germany for four months.
