= Tom Nattermann =

German footballer

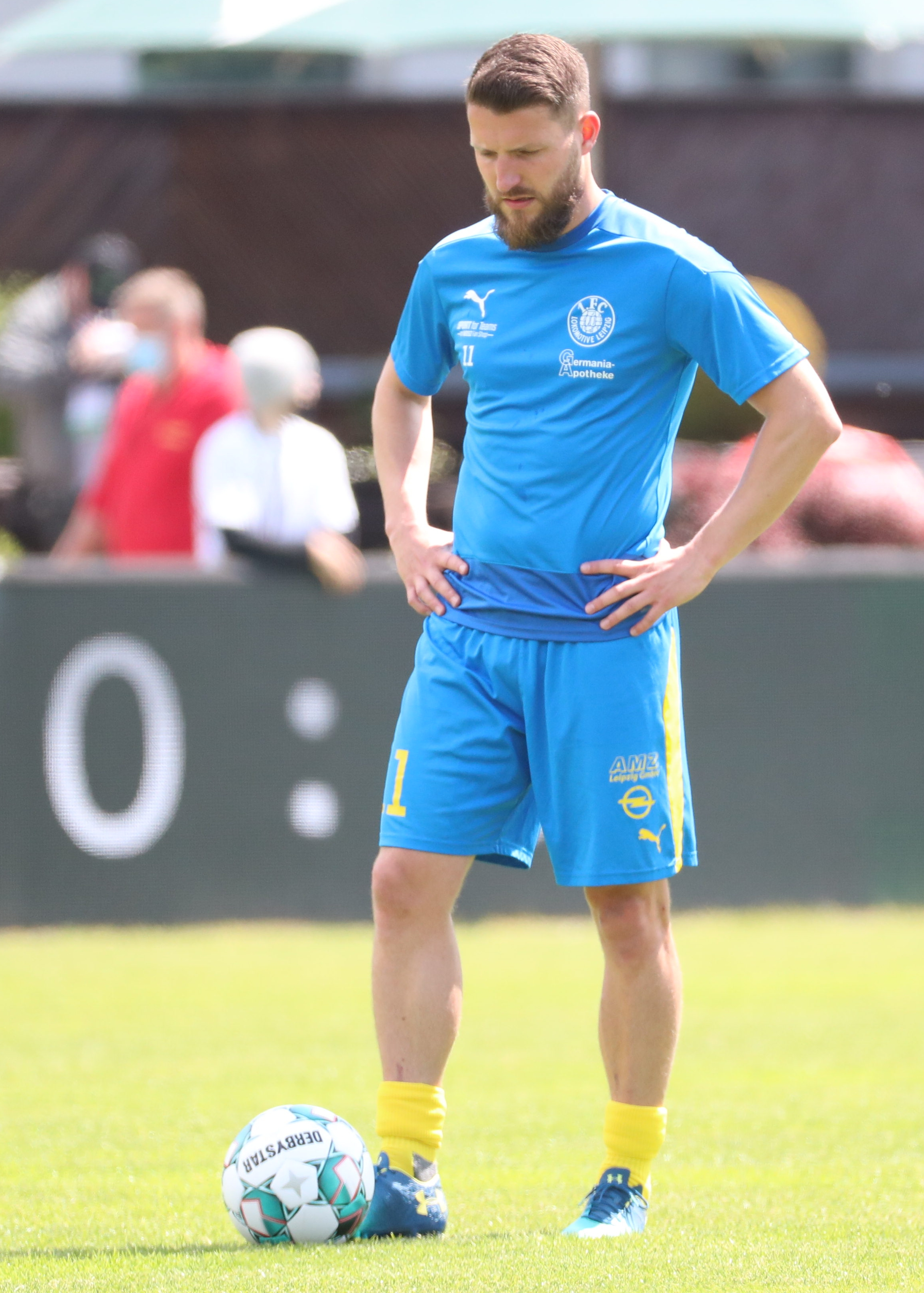

Personal information
- Date of birth: 16 April 1993 (age 33)
- Place of birth: Riesa, Germany
- Height: 1.81 m (5 ft 11 in)
- Position: Centre-forward

Team information
- Current team: Tennis Borussia Berlin
- Number: 11

Youth career
- –2002: SV Grün-Weiß Miltitz
- 2002–2009: Sachsen Leipzig
- 2009–2012: RB Leipzig

Senior career*
Years	Team	Apps	(Gls)
2012–2013	RB Leipzig	2	(0)
2012–2015	RB Leipzig II	70	(68)
2015–2016	Erzgebirge Aue	8	(0)
2016	→ Carl Zeiss Jena (loan)	12	(3)
2016–2017	Energie Cottbus	8	(0)
2017–2018	Germania Halberstadt	17	(3)
2018–2020	SV Babelsberg	54	(21)
2020–2022	1. FC Lokomotive Leipzig	44	(12)
2022–2023	SV Babelsberg	20	(1)
2023–	Tennis Borussia Berlin	29	(20)
- * Club domestic league appearances and goals as of 8 June 2024

Tom Nattermann (born 16 April 1993) is a German footballer who plays as a centre-forward for Tennis Borussia Berlin.

== Career ==
Nattermann made his professional debut for Erzgebirge Aue in the 3. Liga on 25 July 2015, coming on as a substitute in the 78th minute for Nicky Adler in the 0–0 home draw against VfL Osnabrück.
