= Christian Müller (footballer, born 1983) =

German footballer

Personal information
- Full name: Christian Müller
- Date of birth: 13 August 1983 (age 43)
- Place of birth: Offenbach am Main, West Germany
- Height: 1.83 m (6 ft 0 in)
- Position: Defender

Youth career
- –1991: SKG Rumpenheim
- 1991–2002: Kickers Offenbach

Senior career*
Years	Team	Apps	(Gls)
2002–2008	Kickers Offenbach	159	(5)
2008–2009	FC Augsburg	21	(0)
2009–2011	FSV Frankfurt	47	(0)
2011–2014	RB Leipzig	66	(1)
- * Club domestic league appearances and goals as of 21:57, 12 September 2014 (UTC)

Christian Müller (born 13 August 1983) is a German former footballer who played as a defender.

== Career ==
In summer 2009, he transferred to league rivals FSV Frankfurt for an undisclosed fee. He suffered a cruciate ligament tear on his debut for the club in a 2–1 defeat to MSV Duisburg.

In summer 2011, he signed for Regionalliga Nordost club RB Leipzig on a three-year contract.

In a 3–0 win against 1. FC Heidenheim in October 2013, Müller received a red card in the 80th minute for kicking Marc Schnatterer, and was subsequently given a three-match ban.
