= Thiago Rockenbach =

Brazilian footballer

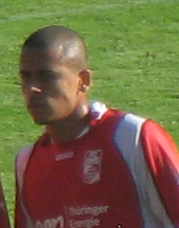
- Thiago Rockenbach with Rot-Weiß Erfurt in 2008

Personal information
- Full name: Thiago Rockenbach da Silva
- Date of birth: 1 February 1985 (age 41)
- Place of birth: Marechal Cândido Rondon, Brazil
- Height: 1.79 m (5 ft 10 in)
- Position: Midfielder

Youth career
- Guarani
- Grêmio
- –2002: Marcílio Dias
- 2002–2004: Werder Bremen

Senior career*
Years	Team	Apps	(Gls)
2004–2007	Werder Bremen II	81	(15)
2007–2010	Rot-Weiß Erfurt	104	(21)
2010	Fortuna Düsseldorf	2	(0)
2011–2014	RB Leipzig	81	(14)
2014	→ Hertha BSC II (loan)	15	(7)
2014–2015	Hertha BSC II	27	(11)
2015–2017	BFC Dynamo	58	(16)
2017–2019	Tennis Borussia Berlin	55	(31)
2019–2020	Berlin United	19	(5)
2020–2021	Brandenburger SC	3	(1)
Total		445	(121)
- * Club domestic league appearances and goals

Thiago Rockenbach da Silva (born 1 February 1985) is a Brazilian former professional footballer who played as a midfielder.

== Career ==
In 2002 Thiago Rockenbach moved to Germany to join Werder Bremen. During his time there he played for the club's reserves while also training with the first team a few times. He joined Rot-Weiß Erfurt in 2007.
