= Timo Röttger =

German footballer

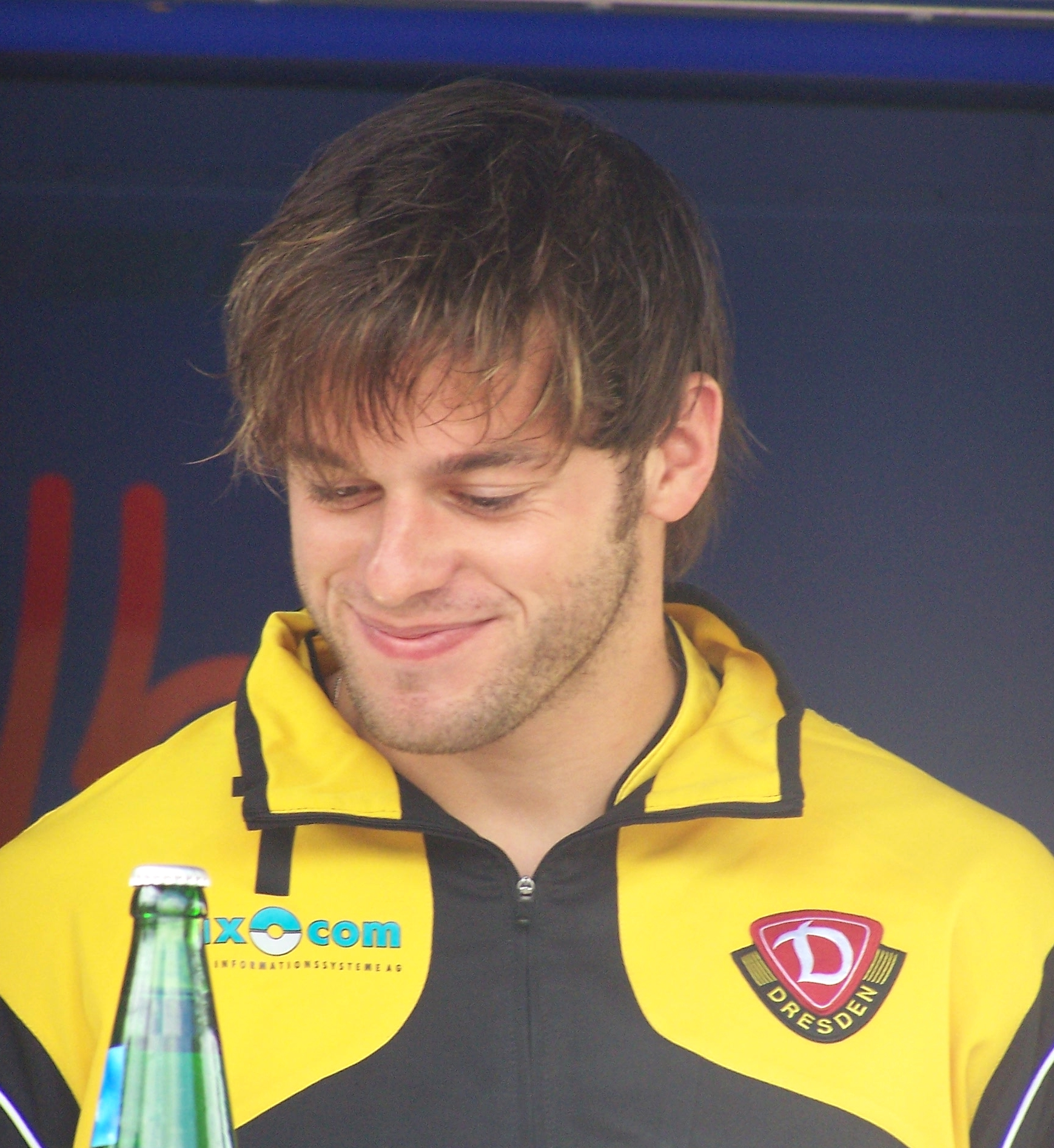
- Timo Röttger while at Dynamo Dresden

Personal information
- Date of birth: 12 July 1985 (age 41)
- Place of birth: Waldbröl, West Germany
- Height: 1.76 m (5 ft 9 in)
- Position: Winger

Youth career
- 1989–1997: SV Wiedenest
- 1997–2000: TuS Wiehl
- 2000–2003: Bayer Leverkusen

Senior career*
Years	Team	Apps	(Gls)
2003–2006	Bayer Leverkusen II	80	(30)
2006–2008	SC Paderborn	41	(8)
2008–2011	Dynamo Dresden	63	(9)
2011–2014	RB Leipzig	86	(10)
2014–2015	Viktoria Köln	20	(2)
2015–2020	Sonnenhof Großaspach	144	(34)
- * Club domestic league appearances and goals as of 1 July 2020

Timo Röttger (born 12 July 1985) is a German footballer.

== Career ==
On 9 May 2014, he signed a two-year contract with Viktoria Köln of fourth tier Regionalliga West.

== Honours ==
Promotion to 2. Bundesliga:

- 2010–11 (3rd) with Dynamo Dresden
- 2013–14 (2nd) with RB Leipzig
