= Christos Papadimitriou (footballer) =

Greek footballer

Personal information
- Date of birth: 10 January 1994 (age 32)
- Place of birth: Athens, Greece
- Height: 1.78 m (5 ft 10 in)
- Position: Left-back

Team information
- Current team: Mauerwerk
- Number: 16

Youth career
- Athinaikos
- 2008–2013: AEK Athens

Senior career*
Years	Team	Apps	(Gls)
2012–2013	AEK Athens	5	(0)
2013–2014	RB Leipzig	1	(0)
2013–2014	RB Leipzig II	6	(2)
2014	→ FC Liefering (loan)	2	(0)
2014–2017	Inter Leipzig	67	(25)
2016–2017	→ Eintracht Trier (loan)	12	(2)
2017–2018	Energie Cottbus	1	(0)
2018–	Mauerwerk	87	(7)

International career
2012	Greece U-18	3	(0)
2012	Greece U-19	3	(0)
- * Club domestic league appearances and goals as of 20:05, 5 March 2023 (UTC)

Christos Papadimitriou (Greek: Χρήστος Παπαδημητρίου, born 10 January 1994) is a Greek professional footballer who plays as a left-back for FC Mauerwerk.

== Career ==
On 11 July 2013, he moved to 3. Liga side RB Leipzig and signed a one-year contract. On December he was loaned to FC Liefering. In August 2014, the Saxonian Landesliga club FC Inter Leipzig announced that they signed Papadimitriou.
