= Dominik Kaiser =

German footballer (born 1988)

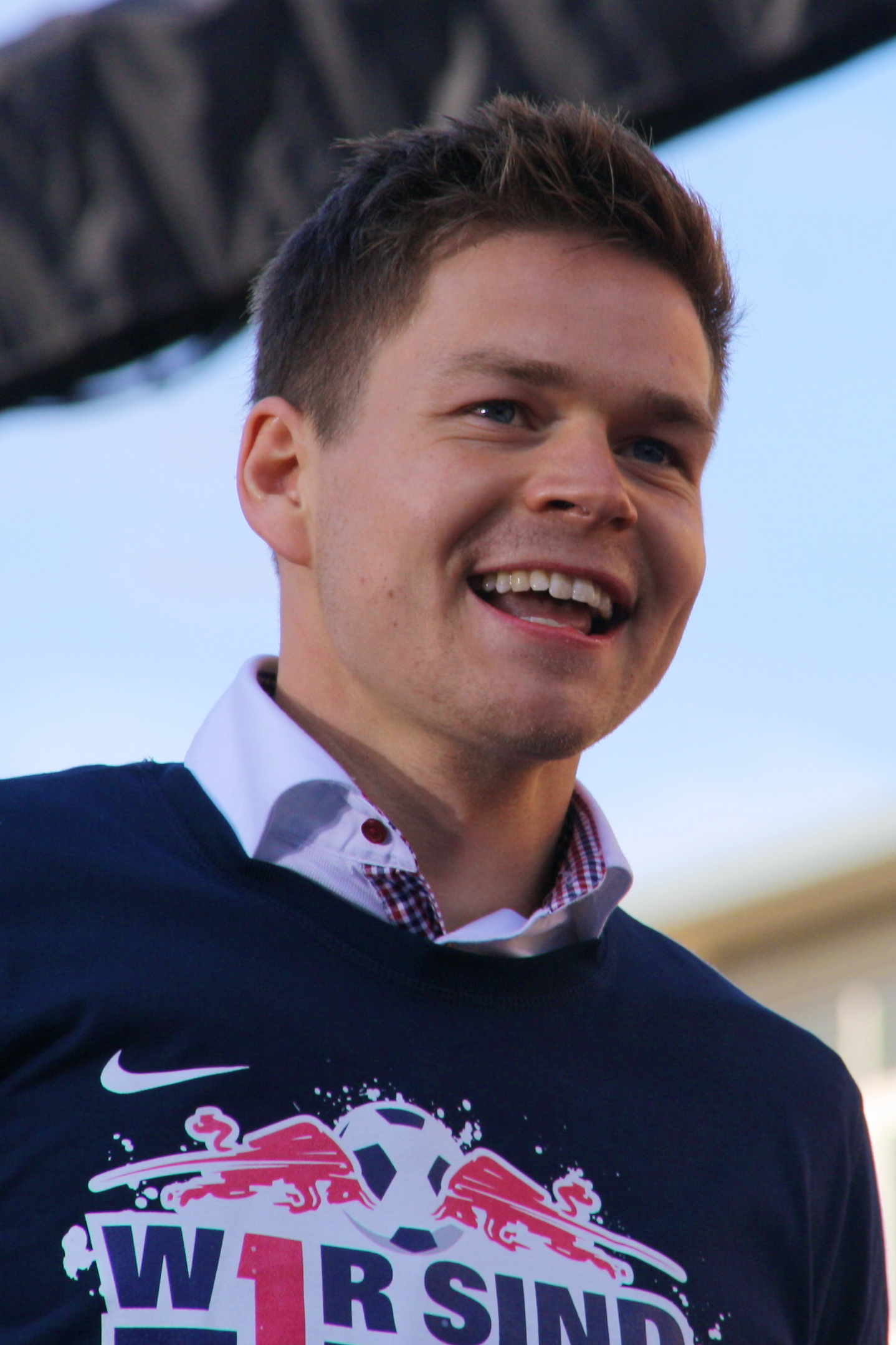
- Kaiser in 2016

Personal information
- Date of birth: 16 September 1988 (age 38)
- Place of birth: Mutlangen, West Germany
- Position: Midfielder

Youth career
- TGSV Waldstetten
- –2004: Normannia Gmünd
- 2004–2007: VfL Kirchheim/Teck

Senior career*
Years	Team	Apps	(Gls)
2007–2009	Normannia Gmünd	61	(8)
2009–2012	1899 Hoffenheim II	66	(7)
2010–2012	1899 Hoffenheim	10	(0)
2012–2018	RB Leipzig	158	(32)
2018–2019	Brøndby	52	(11)
2020–2022	Hannover 96	72	(4)
- * Club domestic league appearances and goals

Dominik Kaiser (born 16 September 1988) is a German former professional footballer who played as a midfielder.

== Career ==
=== Early career ===
Born in Mutlangen, West Germany, Kaiser was raised in Waldstetten and played for various clubs, such as TGSV Waldstetten, Normannia Gmünd and VfL Kirchheim/Teck before re–joining Normannia Gmünd in 2007. Up until he was 17, Kaiser played tennis before decided to quit to fully concentrate on football.

Kaiser made his Normannia Gmünd debut, coming on as a second–half substitute, in a 3–0 loss against Alemannia Aachen in the first round of the DFB–Pokal. Since making for his debut for Normannia Gmünd, Kaiser became a first team regular for the side in the Oberliga Baden-Württemberg.

=== 1899 Hoffenheim ===
In 2009, Kaiser moved to 1899 Hoffenheim II, which was largely credited to his brother, who knew Markus Gisdol at SC Geislingen. Shortly after, he was assigned to the U23 side and then the second team.

At TSG 1899 Hoffenheim II, Kaiser made his debut for the side, where he played 17 minutes after coming on as a second–half substitute, in a 1–0 loss against TSG Weinheim. He then scored his first goal for TSG 1899 Hoffenheim II, in a 6–3 win over FC Denzlingen on 2 September 2009. He went on to finish his first season at TSG 1899 Hoffenheim II, making 32 appearances and scoring five times in all competitions.

At the start of the 2010–11 season, Kaiser was promoted to the first team, where he trained regularly with the squad. He then appeared in the first team as an unused substitute in number of matches, whilst appearing in TSG 1899 Hoffenheim II during the 2010–11 season. Kaiser waited for a long time until on 14 May 2011 when he made his debut at TSG 1899 Hoffenheim, coming on as a second–half substitute for Edson Braafheid, in a 3–1 loss against VfL Wolfsburg.

At some to his TSG 1899 Hoffenheim time there, he signed his first professional contract. At the start of the 2011–12 season, Kaiser was given a handful of first team appearances. His first appearance of the 2011–12 came on 13 August 2011, where he came on as a second–half substitute, in a 1–0 win over Borussia Dortmund. This lasted until late–October when he was replaced by the returning Fabian Johnson and appeared on the substitute bench, as well as, the club's second team for the rest of the season. Despite his first team opportunities limited, Kaiser extended his contract with the club, keeping him until 2014, on 3 January 2012. Later in the 2011–12 season, he made two more appearances.

=== RB Leipzig ===
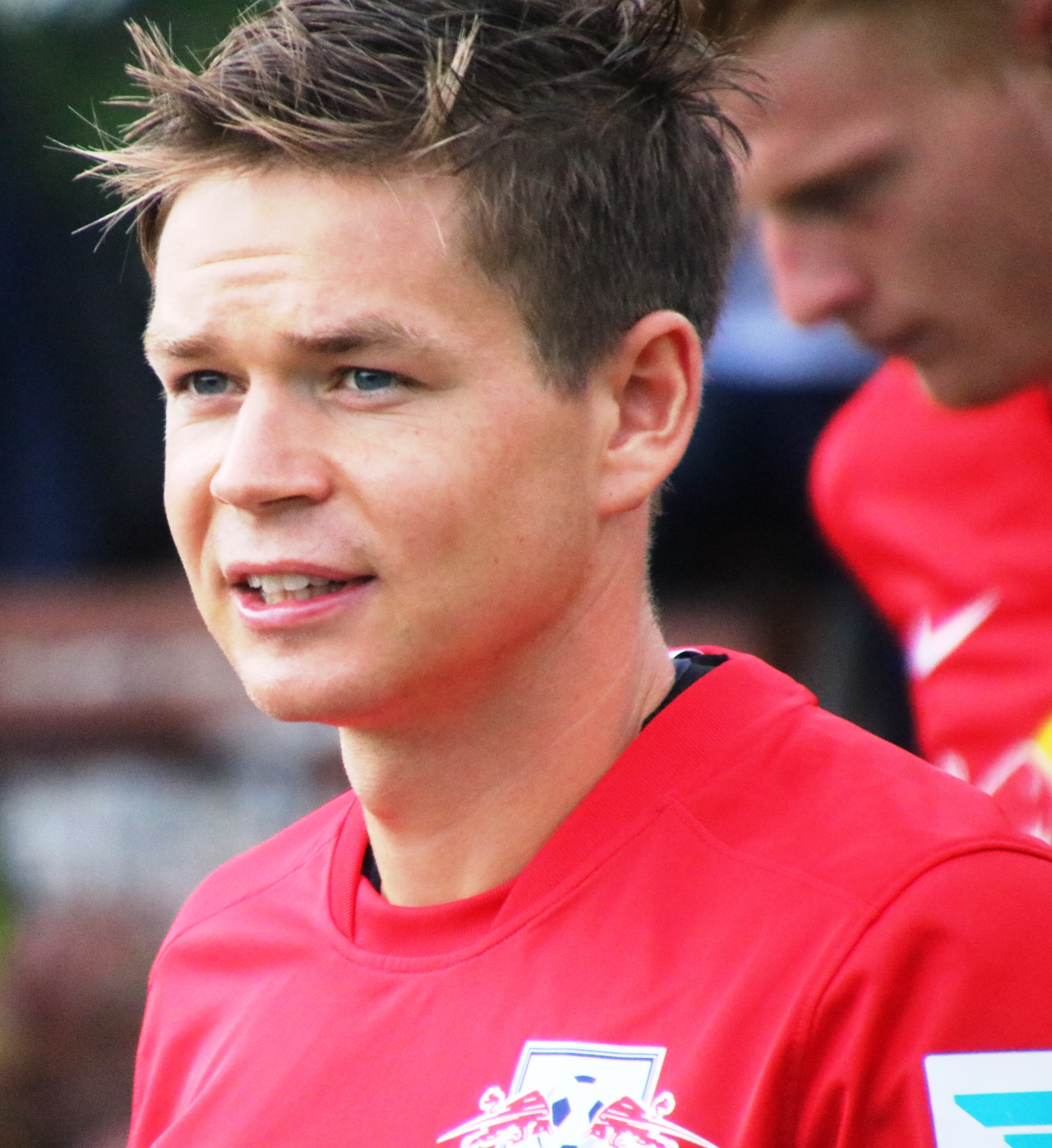
Kaiser pictured in August 2016 for a friendly match against FC Liefering.

Kaiser left TSG 1899 Hoffenheim for RB Leipzig, a club based on Regionalliga Nordost, on 11 July 2012, signing a contract until 2016. The move saw Kaiser reunited with Manager Ralf Rangnick, who he knew at TSG 1899 Hoffenheim.

Kaiser made his RB Leipzig debut in the opening game of the season, starting the whole game, in a 1–1 draw against Union Berlin II. He then scored his first goal for the club on 23 September 2012, in a 3–0 win over Germania Halberstadt. Kaiser helped the side win the Regionalliga Nordost and won promotion to the 3. Liga, after three seasons in the Regionalliga after beating Sportfreunde Lotte.

In the 2013–14 season, Kaiser started the season well when he scored on Matchday 3, in a 2–1 win over Wacker Burghausen. After returning from suspension, Kaiser then scored again on 21 December 2013, in a 2–1 win over Hallescher FC. In a follow-up match against Wacker Burghausen on 25 January 2014, he captained RB Leipzig for the first time in his career, which saw RB Leipzig lose 1–0. He later captained RB Leipzig again for the second time this season, which came against SV Elversberg on 2 March 2014 and scored, as well as, assisting another goal, in a 2–0 win. Then, on 3 May 2014, Kaiser scored a hat–trick, as well as, setting up two goals, in a 5–1 win over 1. FC Saarbrücken, a win that help the club reach promotion to 2. Bundesliga after finishing the season in second place and became the first team since the introduction of the 3. Liga to win promotion to the 2. Bundesliga after only one season. Initially playing out as a defensive midfielder position, Kaiser then switched into playing as an attacking midfielder position.

In the 2014–15 season, Kaiser was featured for the first two league matches to the season before suffering a thigh injury. After returning to the first team from injury, he then scored his first goal of the season, as well as, setting up two goals, in a 3–1 win over Karlsruher SC on 24 September 2014. In the next match against Fortuna Düsseldorf, Kaiser captained the side for the first time this season, in a 2–2 draw. Following this, he continued to regain his first team place for the rest of the season. Later in the 2014–15 season, Kaiser captained the side in a number of matches in the absence of Daniel Frahn. Despite missing two matches later in the 2014–15 season,

Ahead of the 2015–16 season, Kaiser was given a captaincy following the departure of Daniel Frahn to 1. FC Heidenheim. He started out playing in the central–midfielder at the start of the 2015–16 season following a tactics change. Kaiser then set up a goal for Davie Selke, who scored a header, in a 2–0 win over Eintracht Braunschweig on 15 August 2015. On 4 October 2015, he scored his first goal of the season, in a 3–2 win over 1. FC Nürnberg. His goal against FSV Frankfurt on 13 December 2015 earned him December's Goal of the Month. Under his leadership at RB Leipzig, Kaiser helped the club gain promotion to the Bundesliga after beating Karlsruher SC 2–0 on 8 May 2016. Despite missing four matches in the 2015–16 season,

In the 2016–17 season, Kaiser was the first RB Leipzig to score in the Bundesliga. Kaiser started the season at the first team place, but soon lost his first team and was demoted to the substitute bench.

His first appearance of the 2017–18 season came on 27 August 2017, coming on as a second–half substitute, in a 4–1 win over SC Freiburg. He also made his UEFA Champions League debut, where he played 16 minutes after coming on as a second–half substitute, in a 2–1 loss against Beşiktaş on 6 December 2017. Kaiser, himself, said he wanted to stay at the club until the end of the season.

On 13 May 2018, Kaiser was awarded a testimonial match by RB Leipzig, in honour of him being their longest-serving player after spending six years with the club.

=== Brøndby ===
On 1 July 2018, Kaiser signed with Danish Superliga club Brøndby on a two-year contract, reuniting with former Leipzig coach, Alexander Zorniger. In his first season at Brøndby, he reached the Danish Cup final in which he scored. The final was, however, lost to Midtjylland on penalties.

On 8 August 2019, Kaiser scored two goals as Brøndby lost 4–2 in the first leg of the UEFA Europa League qualification match against Portuguese club Braga. The first goal was a sensational shot off a clearance from a Brøndby corner.

At the start of the 2019–20 season he was selected as Brøndby 'Player of the Month' four times in a row. In October 2019, with Kaiser's contract set to expire in the summer, the club expressed an interest in a contract extension.

=== Hannover 96 ===
On 18 January 2020, Kaiser signed with 2. Bundesliga club Hannover 96, after failing to reach an agreement over a contract extension with Brøndby. He made his debut on 28 January in a 1–0 away loss to SSV Jahn Regensburg, coming on as a substitute for Marc Stendera in the 59th minute. He managed 16 appearances during his first six months at the club, as Hannover ended in 6th place in the league table, well out of competition for promotion.

Before the 2020–21 season, Kaiser was appointed the new team captain of Hannover 96 by head coach Kenan Koçak, succeeding Marvin Bakalorz in that role, as the latter had left for Denizlispor. On 14 September 2020, Kaiser scored his first goal for the club in a 3–2 away win over Würzburger Kickers in the DFB-Pokal after an assist by Marvin Ducksch. His first league goal followed shortly after, on 19 September, in a 2–0 win home at Niedersachsenstadion over Karlsruher SC, again after an assist by Ducksch.

=== Retirement ===
After being a free agent for a couple of months, Kaiser announced in German media, that he would retire from professional football.

After a few months he announced that he would indeed return to the world of football, working in the scouting departement of RB Leipzig, the club where he spent the majority of his career.

== Personal life ==
Kaiser has an older brother, Steffen, who works as a doctor in Esslingen.

Outside of football, Kaiser also practices Judo.
