= Sebastian Heidinger =

German footballer

Personal information
- Full name: Sebastian Heidinger
- Date of birth: 11 January 1986 (age 40)
- Place of birth: Miltenberg, West Germany
- Height: 1.73 m (5 ft 8 in)
- Positions: Right back; right midfielder

Team information
- Current team: Red Bull Salzburg (assistant)

Youth career
- 1990–1997: TV Trennfurt
- 1997–2001: FSV Wörth
- 2001–2004: Viktoria Aschaffenburg
- 2004–2005: FC Bayern Munich

Senior career*
Years	Team	Apps	(Gls)
2005–2007	SC Pfullendorf	57	(9)
2007–2009	Fortuna Düsseldorf II	10	(4)
2007–2010	Fortuna Düsseldorf	61	(6)
2010–2011	Arminia Bielefeld	22	(5)
2011–2015	RB Leipzig	91	(9)
2015–2016	1. FC Heidenheim	4	(0)
2016–2017	Greuther Fürth	25	(0)
2017	SC Paderborn 07	16	(1)
2017–2018	Holstein Kiel	12	(0)
2018–2019	Wacker Nordhausen	29	(1)
2018–2019	Wacker Nordhausen II	3	(0)
Total		330	(35)
- * Club domestic league appearances and goals

Sebastian Heidinger (born 11 January 1986) is a German former professional footballer who played as a right back or right midfielder. He currently serves as the assistant coach of Austrian Bundesliga club Red Bull Salzburg.

== Career ==
From 2005 to 2007 Heidinger played for SC Pfullendorf in the Regionalliga Süd. In the 2007–08 season, he moved to Fortuna Düsseldorf in the Regionalliga Nord. Düsseldorf was promoted to the 3. Liga in the same season and in the year after to the 2. Bundesliga. Heidinger scored his first goal in the 2. Liga on 13 December 2009 against Rot-Weiß Oberhausen.

In the 2010–11 season, Heidinger joined Arminia Bielefeld where he signed a two-year contract, but left the club a year later to sign for RB Leipzig. At RB Leipzig, he helped the club to back-to-back promotions in the 2012-13 and 2013-14 seasons.

On 19 January 2016, he joined Greuther Fürth.

In the 2016–17 winter transfer window Heidinger moved to 3. Liga club SC Paderborn 07 making 16 appearances with 1 goal and 2 assists in the second half of the season.

In June 2017, Heidinger joined newly promoted 2. Bundesliga side Holstein Kiel on a one-year contract. Paderborn let him leave on a free transfer.

On 25 August 2018, Haidinger joined FSV Wacker 90 Nordhausen. In October 2019, he was relegated to the club's reserve team alongside 4 other teammates. He left the club at the end of the year.

== Honours ==
Bayern Munich

- German A-Junior Championship: 2004

Fortuna Düsseldorf

- 3. Liga runner-up: 2008–09

RB Leipzig

- 3. Liga runner-up: 2013–14

Paderborn

- Westphalian Cup: 2016–17
