= Henrik Ernst (footballer) =

German footballer (born 1986)

Personal information
- Full name: Henrik Ernst
- Date of birth: 2 September 1986 (age 40)
- Place of birth: Hanover, West Germany
- Height: 1.89 m (6 ft 2 in)
- Position: Defensive midfielder

Team information
- Current team: ZFC Meuselwitz
- Number: 5

Youth career
- –2007: Heesseler SV

Senior career*
Years	Team	Apps	(Gls)
2007–2011	Hannover 96 II	97	(6)
2009–2010	Hannover 96	2	(0)
2011–2015	RB Leipzig	71	(3)
2015–2017	RB Leipzig II	54	(1)
2017–2018	Hannover 96 II	25	(0)
2018–2021	ZFC Meuselwitz	59	(10)
- * Club domestic league appearances and goals

Henrik Ernst (born 2 September 1986) is a German former footballer who played as a midfielder.

Ernst made his professional debut on 17 October 2009 when he came on for the final five minutes of Hannover 96's away game at Eintracht Frankfurt in the Bundesliga. However, most of his appearances have come for Hannover's reserve team, Hannover 96 II.
