= Daniel Frahn =

German footballer

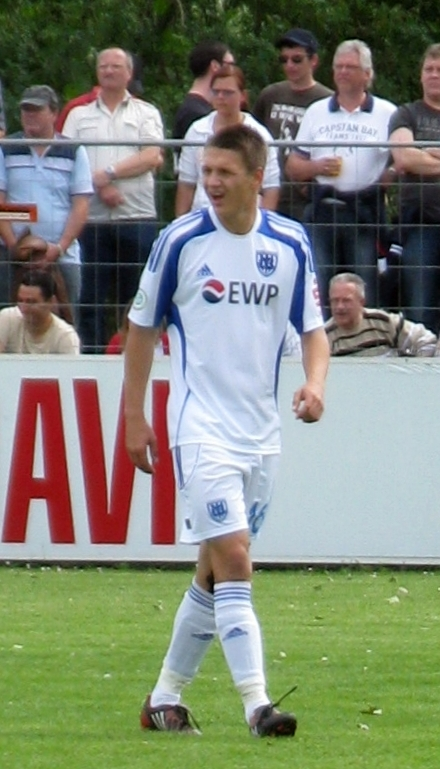
- Frahn playing for Babelsberg 03 in the Brandenburg Cup against Germania

Personal information
- Date of birth: 3 August 1987 (age 39)
- Place of birth: Potsdam, East Germany
- Height: 1.87 m (6 ft 2 in)
- Position: Forward

Youth career
- Glückauf Brieske-Senftenberg
- –2001: 1. FC Turbine Potsdam
- 2001–2005: Energie Cottbus

Senior career*
Years	Team	Apps	(Gls)
2005–2006	Energie Cottbus II	12	(1)
2005–2006	Energie Cottbus	1	(0)
2006–2007	Hertha BSC II	31	(4)
2007–2010	SV Babelsberg 03	87	(45)
2010–2015	RB Leipzig	149	(85)
2015	1. FC Heidenheim	10	(1)
2016–2019	Chemnitzer FC	115	(54)
2020–2025	SV Babelsberg 03	136	(45)
Total		541	(235)

International career
2006	Germany U19	1	(0)
- * Club domestic league appearances and goals

Daniel Frahn (born 3 August 1987) is a German former professional footballer who played as a forward.

== Career ==
=== Early career ===
Frahn began his career with Energie Cottbus, and made one 2. Bundesliga appearance for the club, replacing Markus Dworrak in a 5–2 win over Alemannia Aachen in 2005. A year later he joined Hertha BSC, where he spent a season playing in the reserve team in the Regionalliga Nord, before making the short journey to his hometown, Potsdam, to sign for SV Babelsberg of the same division. His third season with Babelsberg was hugely successful – he finished as the league's top scorer with 29 goals, and the club finished as league champions, earning promotion to the 3. Liga.

=== RB Leipzig ===
Despite Babelsberg's promotion, Frahn opted to stay in the fourth tier, signing for big-spending RB Leipzig along with strike partner Stefan Kutschke. He was the captain of the team, and memorably scored a hat-trick to eliminate VfL Wolfsburg in the first round of the 2011–12 DFB-Pokal. He finished the 2011–12 season as Regionalliga Nord top scorer for a second time (with 26 goals), but the club missed out on promotion, finishing in second place behind Hallescher FC. In the 2012–13 season, RB Leipzig entered the re-formed Regionalliga Nordost, and won the division unbeaten, with Frahn again finishing as top scorer with 20 goals. They beat Sportfreunde Lotte in a playoff to secure promotion to the 3. Liga, although Frahn missed both legs of the tie. He scored the club's first ever 3. Liga goal, in a 1–0 win over Hallescher FC on the opening day of the 2013–14 season. His sixth goal of the season came ten seconds into a home-match against VfB Stuttgart II: seven Leipzig players stormed the Stuttgart half immediately after kick-off; the ball was played back then a long-ball was hit forward to Matthias Morys, who crossed for Frahn to score. RB Leipzig went on to win the match 3–1. Frahn ended the season as the league's secondtop scorer with 19 goals, behind SV Darmstadt 98's Dominik Stroh-Engel, as the Red Bulls were promoted to the 2. Bundesliga as runners-up.

=== FC Heidenheim ===
On 10 June 2015, it was confirmed, that Frahn had signed a contract with 1. FC Heidenheim valid from 1 July 2015.

=== Chemnitzer FC ===
He moved to Chemnitzer FC on 5 January 2016.

On 5 August 2019, Chemnitz terminated Frahn's contract with the club after accusing the player of “openly displaying” his sympathy for neo-Nazi groups.

=== SV Babelsberg 03 ===
Frahn signed for his former club SV Babelsberg 03 in January 2020 as a free agent. His signing caused controversy and divided opinion amongst Babelsberg supporters due to his association with the German far-right, others supported the signing, including club president Archibald Horlitz, who said "I asked everyone in Babelsberg, life members, fans... 'do you think that Frahn is a Nazi?' and no one said yes". Then I asked, 'do you think he has right-wing views'. No one said yes". He made his debut for the club as a substitute against BSG Chemie Leipzig on 2 February 2020.

Frahn retired from professional playing at the end of the 2024–25 season.

== Career statistics ==
Appearances and goals by club, season and competition
Club	Season	League			Cup		Other		Total	
Club	Season	Division	Apps	Goals	Apps	Goals	Apps	Goals	Apps	Goals
Energie Cottbus	2005–06	2. Bundesliga	1	0	0	0	—		1	0
Hertha BSC II	2006–07	Regionalliga Nord	31	4	—		—		31	4
SV Babelsberg 03	2007–08	Regionalliga Nord	28	5	—		—		28	5
SV Babelsberg 03	2008–09	Regionalliga Nord	27	11	1	0	—		28	11
SV Babelsberg 03	2009–10	Regionalliga Nord	32	29	1	0	—		33	29
SV Babelsberg 03	Total		87	45	2	0	0	0	89	45
RB Leipzig	2010–11	Regionalliga Nord	31	16	—		—		31	16
RB Leipzig	2011–12	Regionalliga Nord	34	26	2	3	—		36	29
RB Leipzig	2012–13	Regionalliga Nordost	27	20	—		0 (Note: Regionalliga playoff)	0	27	20
RB Leipzig	2013–14	3. Liga	34	19	1	0	—		35	19
RB Leipzig	2014–15	2. Bundesliga	23	4	2	0	—		25	4
RB Leipzig	Total		149	85	5	3	0	0	154	88
1. FC Heidenheim	2015–16	2. Bundesliga	10	1	1	0	—		11	1
Chemnitzer FC	2015–16	3. Liga	15	8	—		—		15	8
Chemnitzer FC	2016–17	3. Liga	35	9	—		—		35	9
Chemnitzer FC	2017–18	3. Liga	32	13	1	0	—		33	13
Chemnitzer FC	2018–19	Regionalliga Nordost	32	24	—		—		32	24
Chemnitzer FC	2019–20	3. Liga	1	0	0	0	—		1	0
Chemnitzer FC	Total		115	54	1	0	0	0	116	54
Babelsberg 03	2019–20	Regionalliga Nordost	5	2	—		—		5	2
Babelsberg 03	2020–21	Regionalliga Nordost	13	6	—		—		13	6
Babelsberg 03	2021–22	Regionalliga Nordost	30	18	2	0	—		32	18
Babelsberg 03	2022–23	Regionalliga Nordost	27	12	—		—		27	12
Babelsberg 03	2023–24	Regionalliga Nordost	32	3	—		—		32	3
Babelsberg 03	2024–25	Regionalliga Nordost	29	4	—		—		29	4
Babelsberg 03	Total		136	45	2	0	0	0	138	45
Career total			529	234	11	3	0	0	540	237
