= Fabian Franke =

German footballer

Personal information
- Date of birth: March 7, 1989 (age 37)
- Place of birth: Leipzig, Germany
- Height: 1.91 m (6 ft 3 in)
- Position: Central defender

Team information
- Current team: SSV Markranstädt
- Number: 28

Youth career
- VfK Blau-Weiß Leipzig 1892
- Kickers 94 Markkleeberg
- –2008: FC Sachsen Leipzig

Senior career*
Years	Team	Apps	(Gls)
2008–2010	Hamburger SV II	16	(0)
2010–2015	RB Leipzig	99	(4)
2015	→ RB Leipzig II	4	(0)
2015–2016	Wehen Wiesbaden	9	(0)
2016–2018	Hallescher FC	24	(0)
2018–	SSV Markranstädt	25	(3)
- * Club domestic league appearances and goals as of 3 October 2020

Fabian Franke (born March 7, 1989) is a German footballer who plays as a central defender for SSV Markranstädt.
