= Wosz =

Wosz is a surname. Notable people with this surname include:

- Dariusz Wosz (born 1969), German footballer
- Joscha Wosz (born 2002), German footballer
