= 2021–22 RB Leipzig season =

RB Leipzig
2021–22 season
- Owner: Red Bull GmbH
- CEO: Oliver Mintzlaff
- Head coach: Jesse Marsch (until 5 December); Achim Beierlorzer (interim; from 5 December to 9 December); Domenico Tedesco (from 9 December)
- Stadium: Red Bull Arena
- Bundesliga: 4th
- DFB-Pokal: Winners
- UEFA Champions League: Group stage
- UEFA Europa League: Semi-finals
- Top goalscorer: League: Christopher Nkunku (20); All: Christopher Nkunku (35)
Home colours	Away colours	Third colours

The 2021–22 season was the 13th season in the existence of RB Leipzig and the club's sixth consecutive season in the top flight of German football. In addition to the domestic league, RB Leipzig participated in this season's editions of the DFB-Pokal, the UEFA Champions League and the UEFA Europa League. This was Jesse Marsch's first season as coach, succeeding Julian Nagelsmann before being sacked mid-season.

== Players ==
=== First-team squad ===
Note: Flags indicate national team as defined under FIFA eligibility rules; some limited exceptions apply. Players may hold more than one non-FIFA nationality.

No.	Pos.	Nation	Player
1	GK	HUN	Péter Gulácsi (captain)
2	DF	FRA	Mohamed Simakan
3	DF	ESP	Angeliño
4	DF	HUN	Willi Orbán (vice-captain)
8	MF	MLI	Amadou Haidara
9	FW	DEN	Yussuf Poulsen (3rd captain)
10	MF	SWE	Emil Forsberg
13	GK	GER	Philipp Tschauner
14	MF	USA	Tyler Adams
16	DF	GER	Lukas Klostermann
17	MF	HUN	Dominik Szoboszlai
18	MF	FRA	Christopher Nkunku
22	DF	FRA	Nordi Mukiele

No.	Pos.	Nation	Player
23	DF	GER	Marcel Halstenberg
25	MF	ESP	Dani Olmo
27	MF	AUT	Konrad Laimer
31	GK	ESP	Josep Martínez
32	DF	CRO	Joško Gvardiol
33	FW	POR	André Silva
35	DF	NED	Solomon Bonnah
37	MF	GER	Sidney Raebiger
38	FW	ESP	Hugo Novoa
39	DF	GER	Benjamin Henrichs
44	MF	SLO	Kevin Kampl (4th captain)
45	MF	GER	Mehmet Ibrahimi
46	MF	GER	Ben Klefisch

=== Players out on loan ===
Note: Flags indicate national team as defined under FIFA eligibility rules; some limited exceptions apply. Players may hold more than one non-FIFA nationality.

No.	Pos.	Nation	Player
—	GK	SUI	Yvon Mvogo (at PSV Eindhoven until 30 June 2022)
—	GK	GER	Tim Schreiber (at Hallescher FC until 30 June 2022)
—	DF	GER	Frederik Jäkel (at Oostende until 30 June 2022)
—	DF	GER	Eric Martel (at Austria Wien until 30 June 2022)
—	MF	GER	Tom Krauß (at 1. FC Nürnberg until 30 June 2022)
—	FW	GER	Dennis Borkowski (at 1. FC Nürnberg until 30 June 2022)
—	MF	USA	Caden Clark (at New York Red Bulls until 31 December 2022)

No.	Pos.	Nation	Player
11	FW	KOR	Hwang Hee-chan (at Wolverhampton Wanderers until 30 June 2022)
19	FW	NOR	Alexander Sørloth (at Real Sociedad until 30 June 2022)
21	FW	NED	Brian Brobbey (at Ajax until 30 June 2022)
26	MF	GUI	Ilaix Moriba (at Valencia until 30 June 2022)
35	FW	GER	Fabrice Hartmann (at Eintracht Braunschweig until 30 June 2022)
41	FW	NGR	Ademola Lookman (at Leicester City until 30 June 2022)
47	MF	GER	Joscha Wosz (at Hallescher FC until 30 June 2022)

== Transfers ==
=== In ===
No.	Pos.	Player	Transferred from	Fee	Date	Source
2	DF	(France) Mohamed Simakan	(France) Strasbourg	€15,000,000	1 July 2021	
39	DF	(Germany) Benjamin Henrichs	(France) Monaco	€15,000,000	1 July 2021	
21	ST	(Netherlands) Brian Brobbey	(Netherlands) Ajax	Free	1 July 2021	
32	DF	(Croatia) Joško Gvardiol	(Croatia) Dinamo Zagreb	End of loan	1 July 2021	
	MF	(United States) Caden Clark	(United States) New York Red Bulls	€1,820,000	1 July 2021	
33	FW	(Portugal) André Silva	(Germany) Eintracht Frankfurt	€23,000,000	2 July 2021	
26	MF	(Spain) Ilaix Moriba	(Spain) Barcelona	€16,000,000	31 August 2021	

=== Out ===
No.	Pos.	Player	Transferred to	Fee	Date	Source
5	DF	(France) Dayot Upamecano	(Germany) Bayern Munich	€42,500,000	1 July 2021	
6	DF	(France) Ibrahima Konaté	(England) Liverpool	€41,500,000	1 July 2021	
19	MF	(Austria) Hannes Wolf	(Germany) Borussia Mönchengladbach	€9,500,000	1 July 2021	
35	FW	(Germany) Fabrice Hartmann	(Germany) SC Paderborn	Loan	1 July 2021	
	MF	(United States) Caden Clark	(United States) New York Red Bulls	Loan	1 July 2021	
20	MF	(Germany) Lazar Samardžić	(Italy) Udinese	€3,000,000	5 August 2021	
19	FW	(Norway) Alexander Sørloth	(Spain) Real Sociedad	Loan	25 August 2021	
11	FW	(South Korea) Hwang Hee-chan	(England) Wolverhampton Wanderers	Loan	29 August 2021	
7	MF	(Austria) Marcel Sabitzer	(Germany) Bayern Munich	€15,000,000	30 August 2021	
41	FW	(England) Ademola Lookman	(England) Leicester City	Loan	31 August 2021	
21	FW	(Netherlands) Brian Brobbey	(Netherlands) Ajax	Loan	1 January 2022	
36	DF	(Brazil) Luan Cândido	(Brazil) Red Bull Bragantino	Undisclosed	1 January 2022	
43	DF	(Uruguay) Marcelo Saracchi		Released	1 January 2022	
47	MF	(Germany) Joscha Wosz	(Germany) Hallescher FC	Loan	21 January 2022	
26	MF	(Spain) Ilaix Moriba	(Spain) Valencia	Loan	28 January 2022	
35	FW	(Germany) Fabrice Hartmann	(Germany) Eintracht Braunschweig	Loan	28 January 2022	
	MF	(United States) Caden Clark	(United States) New York Red Bulls	Loan	9 February 2022	

== Pre-season and friendlies ==
Win Draw Loss Fixtures

17 July 2021 Friendly	RB Leipzig	1–0	AZ	Leipzig, Germany
18:00 CEST (UTC+2)	Samardžić 51'	Report		Stadium: Trainingszentrum RB Leipzig Platz 1 Attendance: 600

23 July 2021 Friendly	RB Leipzig	1–2	Montpellier	Leipzig, Germany
18:00 CEST (UTC+2)	Sørloth 10'; Owusu (yellow card) 26'	Report	Laborde (yellow card) 25'; Sambia (yellow card) 28'; Makouana 96'; Wahi 117'	Stadium: Trainingszentrum RB Leipzig Platz 1 Attendance: 650
Note: The match was played in four quarters 30 minutes each.

31 July 2021 Friendly	RB Leipzig	1–1	Ajax	Grödig, Austria
16:00 CEST (UTC+2)	Nkunku 54'; Mukiele (yellow card) 89'	Report	Tadić 4'; Schuurs (yellow card) 78'; Taylor (yellow card) 80'	Stadium: Untersberg-Arena; Attendance: 820; Referee: Christopher Jäger

31 July 2021 Friendly	RB Leipzig	1–0	Al Hilal	Grödig, Austria
--:-- CEST (UTC+2)	Forsberg 41' (pen.)	Report		Stadium: Untersberg-Arena
Note: The match was played in two halves of thirty minutes each.

6 October 2021 Friendly	RB Leipzig	1–2	Śląsk Wrocław	Leipzig, Germany
15:30 CEST (UTC+2)	Nkunku 42'	Report	Sobota 14'; Expósito 17'	Stadium: Trainingszentrum RB Leipzig Platz 1 Attendance: 261

11 November 2021 Friendly	RB Leipzig	2–1	FC Eilenburg	Leipzig, Germany
17:30 CET (UTC+1)	Smorgol 38'; Ibrahimi 70'	Report	Tzeuschner 86'	Stadium: Trainingszentrum RB Leipzig Platz 1 Attendance: 333

== Competitions ==
=== Overall record ===
Competition	First match	Last match	Starting round	Final position	Record							
Competition	First match	Last match	Starting round	Final position	Pld	W	D	L	GF	GA	GD	Win %
Bundesliga	15 August 2021	14 May 2022	Matchday 1	4th	34	17	7	10	72	37	+35	50.00
DFB-Pokal	7 August 2021	21 May 2022	First round	Winners	6	5	1	0	14	2	+12	83.33
UEFA Champions League	15 September 2021	7 December 2021	Group stage	Group stage	6	2	1	3	15	14	+1	33.33
UEFA Europa League	17 February 2022	5 May 2022	Knockout round play-offs	Semi-finals	6	3	2	1	10	7	+3	50.00
Total					52	27	11	14	111	60	+51	51.92

Source: Soccerway

=== Bundesliga ===
==== League table ====
Pos	Team	Pld	W	D	L	GF	GA	GD	Pts	Qualification or relegation
2	Borussia Dortmund	34	22	3	9	85	52	+33	69	Qualification for the Champions League group stage
3	Bayer Leverkusen	34	19	7	8	80	47	+33	64	Qualification for the Champions League group stage
4	RB Leipzig	34	17	7	10	72	37	+35	58	Qualification for the Champions League group stage
5	Union Berlin	34	16	9	9	50	44	+6	57	Qualification for the Europa League group stage (Note: Since the 2021–22 DFB-Pokal winners, RB Leipzig, qualified for the Champions League based on league position, the Europa League group stage spot was passed to the sixth-placed team, and the Europa Conference League play-off round spot was passed to the seventh-placed team.)
6	SC Freiburg	34	15	10	9	58	46	+12	55	Qualification for the Europa League group stage

Source: DFB
Rules for classification: 1) Points; 2) Goal difference; 3) Goals scored; 4) Head-to-head results; 5) Head-to-head away goals scored; 6) Away goals scored; 7) Play-off.

==== Results summary ====
Overall								Home						Away					
Pld	W	D	L	GF	GA	GD	Pts	W	D	L	GF	GA	GD	W	D	L	GF	GA	GD
34	17	7	10	72	37	+35	58	11	2	4	43	17	+26	6	5	6	29	20	+9

Source: DFB

==== Results by round ====
Round	1	2	3	4	5	6	7	8	9	10	11	12	13	14	15	16	17	18	19	20	21	22	23	24	25	26	27	28	29	30	31	32	33	34
Ground	A	H	A	H	A	H	H	A	H	A	H	A	H	A	H	A	H	H	A	H	A	H	A	A	H	A	H	A	H	A	H	A	H	A
Result	L	W	L	L	D	W	W	D	W	D	W	L	L	L	W	D	L	W	W	W	L	W	W	W	D	W	D	W	W	W	L	L	W	D
Position	13	6	10	12	12	10	8	8	6	8	5	7	8	11	7	9	11	9	7	6	7	4	4	4	5	4	4	4	4	3	4	5	4	4

Source: DFB
A = Away; H = Home; W = Win; D = Draw; L = Loss

==== Matches ====
The league fixtures were announced on 25 June 2021.

15 August 2021 1	Mainz 05	1–0	RB Leipzig	Mainz
15:30 CEST (UTC+2)	Niakhaté 13'; Nebel (yellow card) 48'	Report	Kampl (yellow card) 7'; Sabitzer (yellow card) 80'	Stadium: Opel Arena; Attendance: 10,500; Referee: Daniel Siebert

20 August 2021 2	RB Leipzig	4–0	VfB Stuttgart	Leipzig
20:30 CEST (UTC+2)	Szoboszlai 38', 52'; Forsberg 46'; Silva 65' (pen.)	Report	Kempf (yellow card) 64'; Förster (yellow card) 68'; Mavropanos (yellow card) 71'	Stadium: Red Bull Arena; Attendance: 23,100; Referee: Florian Badstübner

29 August 2021 3	VfL Wolfsburg	1–0	RB Leipzig	Wolfsburg
17:30 CEST (UTC+2)	Steffen (yellow card) 35'; Roussillon 52', (yellow card) 89'; Schlager (yellow card) 65'; Guilavogui (yellow card) 70'	Report	Gvardiol (yellow card) 26'; Adams (yellow card) 35'	Stadium: Volkswagen Arena; Attendance: 12,058; Referee: Tobias Stieler

11 September 2021 4	RB Leipzig	1–4	Bayern Munich	Leipzig
18:30 CEST (UTC+2)	Laimer 58'	Report	Lewandowski 12' (pen.); Musiala 47'; Sané 54'; Choupo-Moting 90+2'	Stadium: Red Bull Arena; Attendance: 34,000; Referee: Deniz Aytekin

18 September 2021 5	1. FC Köln	1–1	RB Leipzig	Cologne
18:30 CEST (UTC+2)	Czichos (yellow card) 17'; Modeste 53'; Meré (yellow card) 76'; Schmitz (yellow card) 79'	Report	Haidara 71'; Klostermann (yellow card) 76'	Stadium: RheinEnergieStadion; Attendance: 25,000; Referee: Felix Brych

25 September 2021 6	RB Leipzig	6–0	Hertha BSC	Leipzig
15:30 CEST (UTC+2)	Nkunku 16', 70'; Poulsen 23'; Mukiele 45+4', (yellow card) 62'; Forsberg 60' (pen.); Haidara 77'	Report	Darida (yellow card) 25'; Stark (yellow card) 59'; Plattenhardt (yellow card) 85'	Stadium: Red Bull Arena; Attendance: 23,500; Referee: Sascha Stegemann

2 October 2021 7	RB Leipzig	3–0	VfL Bochum	Leipzig
18:30 CEST (UTC+2)	Angeliño (yellow card) 58'; Silva 70'; Nkunku 73', 78'	Report	Tesche (yellow card) 80'	Stadium: Red Bull Arena; Attendance: 25,598; Referee: Robert Hartmann

16 October 2021 8	SC Freiburg	1–1	RB Leipzig	Freiburg
15:30 CEST (UTC+2)	Jeong 64'	Report	Forsberg 32' (pen.); Haidara (yellow card) 44'; Gvardiol (yellow card) 57'; Simakan (yellow card) 85'; Mukiele (yellow card) 89'	Stadium: Schwarzwald-Stadion; Attendance: 20,000; Referee: Daniel Siebert

23 October 2021 9	RB Leipzig	4–1	Greuther Fürth	Leipzig
15:30 CEST (UTC+2)	Angeliño (yellow card) 15'; Kampl (yellow card) 36'; Poulsen 47'; Forsberg 52' (pen.); Szoboszlai 65'; Novoa 88'	Report	Hrgota 45' (pen.)	Stadium: Red Bull Arena; Attendance: 24,758; Referee: Christian Dingert

30 October 2021 10	Eintracht Frankfurt	1–1	RB Leipzig	Frankfurt
18:30 CEST (UTC+2)	Trapp (yellow card) 69'; Tuta 90+4'	Report	Poulsen 35'; Gulácsi (yellow card) 90+3'	Stadium: Deutsche Bank Park; Attendance: 31,000; Referee: Daniel Schlager

6 November 2021 11	RB Leipzig	2–1	Borussia Dortmund	Leipzig
18:30 CET (UTC+1)	Nkunku 29'; Adams (yellow card) 40'; Poulsen (yellow card) 65', (goal) 68'; Szoboszlai (yellow card) 88'	Report	Bellingham (yellow card) 31'; Reus (yellow card) 31', (goal) 52'; Witsel (yellow card) 38'; Meunier (yellow card) 55'; Moukoko (yellow card) 89'	Stadium: Red Bull Arena; Attendance: 43,429; Referee: Felix Zwayer

20 November 2021 12	1899 Hoffenheim	2–0	RB Leipzig	Sinsheim
15:30 CET (UTC+1)	Samassékou 12'; Grillitsch (yellow card) 42'; Dabbur 68'; Nordtveit (yellow card) 90+3'	Report	Silva (yellow card) 35'; Angeliño (yellow card) 84'	Stadium: Rhein-Neckar-Arena; Attendance: 13,233; Referee: Tobias Welz

28 November 2021 13	RB Leipzig	1–3	Bayer Leverkusen	Leipzig
17:30 CET (UTC+1)	Forsberg (yellow card) 38'; Silva 62'; Szoboszlai (penalty missed) 88'	Report	Andrich (yellow card) 14'; Wirtz 21'; Diaby 34'; Frimpong 64', (yellow card) 90+3'; Hrádecký (yellow card) 82'	Stadium: Red Bull Arena; Attendance: 0 Referee: Benjamin Cortus

3 December 2021 14	Union Berlin	2–1	RB Leipzig	Berlin
20:30 CET (UTC+1)	Awoniyi 6'; Baumgartl 57'; Khedira (yellow card) 64'	Report	Nkunku 13'; Szoboszlai (yellow card) 65'	Stadium: Stadion An der Alten Försterei; Attendance: 13,506; Referee: Harm Osmers

11 December 2021 15	RB Leipzig	4–1	Borussia Mönchengladbach	Leipzig
15:30 CET (UTC+1)	Gvardiol 21', (yellow card) 81'; Silva 32'; Orbán (yellow card) 59'; Simakan (yellow card) 89'; Nkunku 90+1'; Henrichs 90+4'	Report	Embolo (yellow card) 41'; Stindl (yellow card) 42'; Bensebaini 88'	Stadium: Red Bull Arena; Attendance: 0 Referee: Bastian Dankert

15 December 2021 16	FC Augsburg	1–1	RB Leipzig	Augsburg
20:30 CET (UTC+1)	Dorsch (yellow card) 44'; Caligiuri 86' (pen.); Bazee (yellow card) 87'	Report	Silva 19'	Stadium: WWK Arena; Attendance: 0 Referee: Florian Badstübner

18 December 2021 17	RB Leipzig	0–2	Arminia Bielefeld	Leipzig
15:30 CET (UTC+1)		Report	Andrade (yellow card) 26'; Serra 57'; Klos (red card) 70'; Okugawa 75'; Kunze (yellow card) 90'	Stadium: Red Bull Arena; Attendance: 0 Referee: Frank Willenborg

8 January 2022 18	RB Leipzig	4–1	Mainz 05	Leipzig
15:30 CET (UTC+1)	Silva 21', 61'; Szoboszlai 47'; Nkunku 58'	Report	Lee (yellow card) 16', (goal) 57'; Hack (red card) 20'; Bell (yellow card) 59'	Stadium: Red Bull Arena; Attendance: 0 Referee: Deniz Aytekin

15 January 2022 19	VfB Stuttgart	0–2	RB Leipzig	Stuttgart
15:30 CET (UTC+1)	Coulibaly (yellow card) 8'; Tibidi (yellow card) 53'; Kalajdžić (yellow card) 90+2'	Report	Silva 11' (pen.); Poulsen (yellow card) 55'; Nkunku 70'	Stadium: Mercedes-Benz Arena; Attendance: 500; Referee: Daniel Schlager

23 January 2022 20	RB Leipzig	2–0	VfL Wolfsburg	Leipzig
15:30 CET (UTC+1)	Simakan (yellow card) 34'; Henrichs (yellow card) 37'; Kampl (yellow card) 67'; Olmo (yellow card) 73'; Orbán 76'; Adams (yellow card) 82'; Gvardiol 84'	Report	Lacroix (yellow card) 59'	Stadium: Red Bull Arena; Attendance: 1,000; Referee: Daniel Siebert

5 February 2022 21	Bayern Munich	3–2	RB Leipzig	Munich
18:30 CET (UTC+1)	Müller 12'; Hernandez (yellow card) 22'; Lewandowski 44'; Gvardiol 58' (o.g.)	Report	Silva 27'; Laimer (yellow card) 45+1'; Nkunku 53', (yellow card) 63'; Henrichs (yellow card) 74'	Stadium: Allianz Arena; Attendance: 10,000; Referee: Sven Jablonski

11 February 2022 22	RB Leipzig	3–1	1. FC Köln	Leipzig
20:30 CET (UTC+1)	Nkunku 25'; Olmo 54'; Angeliño 57'; Gvardiol (yellow card) 62'	Report	Thielmann (yellow card) 9'; Hübers (yellow card) 35'; Lemperle 90+1'	Stadium: Red Bull Arena; Attendance: 15,000; Referee: Florian Badstübner

20 February 2022 23	Hertha BSC	1–6	RB Leipzig	Berlin
19:30 CET (UTC+1)	Richter (yellow card) 25'; Jovetić 48'; Kempf (red card) 62'; Ascacíbar (yellow card) 84'	Report	Henrichs 20'; Gvardiol (yellow card) 34'; Nkunku 64' (pen.), 67', (yellow card) 64'; Olmo 75'; Haidara 82', (yellow card) 85'; Poulsen 89'	Stadium: Olympiastadion; Attendance: 10,000; Referee: Patrick Ittrich

27 February 2022 24	VfL Bochum	0–1	RB Leipzig	Bochum
15:30 CET (UTC+1)	Gamboa (yellow card) 87'	Report	Simakan (yellow card) 71'; Nkunku 82'	Stadium: Vonovia Ruhrstadion; Attendance: 10,000; Referee: Felix Brych

5 March 2022 25	RB Leipzig	1–1	SC Freiburg	Leipzig
15:30 CET (UTC+1)	Henrichs (yellow card) 68'; Angeliño 90'	Report	Demirović 38'	Stadium: Red Bull Arena; Attendance: 24,758; Referee: Felix Zwayer

13 March 2022 26	Greuther Fürth	1–6	RB Leipzig	Fürth
19:30 CET (UTC+1)	Leweling 4'; Willems (yellow card) 23'; Abiama (yellow card) 87'	Report	Silva 17'; Forsberg 32'; Laimer 35'; Henrichs 45'; Simakan 59'; Nkunku 69'	Stadium: Sportpark Ronhof; Attendance: 9,418; Referee: Sven Jablonski

20 March 2022 27	RB Leipzig	0–0	Eintracht Frankfurt	Leipzig
15:30 CET (UTC+1)	Laimer (yellow card) 19'	Report	Ndicka (yellow card) 35'; Hinteregger (yellow card) 50'; Hrustic (yellow card) 56'; Hauge (yellow card) 90+1'; Jakić (yellow card) 90+3'	Stadium: Red Bull Arena; Attendance: 43,058; Referee: Christian Dingert

2 April 2022 28	Borussia Dortmund	1–4	RB Leipzig	Dortmund
18:30 CEST (UTC+2)	Hazard (yellow card) 45'; Can (yellow card) 80'; Malen 84', (yellow card) 88'	Report	Laimer 21', 30'; Kampl (yellow card) 54'; Nkunku 58'; Olmo 86'	Stadium: Signal Iduna Park; Attendance: 81,365; Referee: Marco Fritz

10 April 2022 29	RB Leipzig	3–0	1899 Hoffenheim	Leipzig
19:30 CEST (UTC+2)	Nkunku 5'; Halstenberg 20'; Szoboszlai 44'; Mukiele (yellow card) 76'	Report	Kadeřábek (yellow card) 71'; Richards (yellow card) 77'	Stadium: Red Bull Arena; Attendance: 35,112; Referee: Bastian Dankert

17 April 2022 30	Bayer Leverkusen	0–1	RB Leipzig	Leverkusen
19:30 CEST (UTC+2)	Hincapié (yellow card) 48'; Andrich (yellow card) 72'	Report	Gvardiol (yellow card) 36'; Szoboszlai 69'	Stadium: BayArena; Attendance: 26,119; Referee: Daniel Siebert

23 April 2022 31	RB Leipzig	1–2	Union Berlin	Leipzig
15:30 CEST (UTC+2)	Poulsen 46'; Olmo (yellow card) 87'; Adams (yellow card) 90+6'	Report	Michel 86'; Behrens 89', (yellow card) 90+1'; Rønnow (yellow card) 90+4'	Stadium: Red Bull Arena; Attendance: 45,770; Referee: Daniel Schlager

2 May 2022 32	Borussia Mönchengladbach	3–1	RB Leipzig	Mönchengladbach
20:30 CEST (UTC+2)	Embolo 17'; Stindl (yellow card) 23'; Hofmann 45+2', 77', (yellow card) 90+2'; Elvedi (red card) 64'; Koné (yellow card) 88'; Neuhaus (yellow card) 90+1'	Report	Gvardiol (yellow card) 10'; Simakan (yellow card) 22'; Nkunku 36'	Stadium: Borussia-Park; Attendance: 35,324; Referee: Martin Petersen

8 May 2022 33	RB Leipzig	4–0	FC Augsburg	Leipzig
19:30 CEST (UTC+2)	Forsberg (yellow card) 36', (goal) 64' (pen.); Silva 40'; Nkunku 48', 57'	Report	Gouweleeuw (yellow card) 73'; Günther (yellow card) 77'	Stadium: Red Bull Arena; Attendance: 37,029; Referee: Bastian Dankert

14 May 2022 34	Arminia Bielefeld	1–1	RB Leipzig	Bielefeld
15:30 CEST (UTC+2)	Serra 70'; Nilsson (yellow card) 85'	Report	Adams (yellow card) 88'; Orbán 90+3'	Stadium: Bielefelder Alm; Attendance: 22,719; Referee: Daniel Siebert

=== DFB-Pokal ===
7 August 2021 First round	SV Sandhausen	0–4	RB Leipzig	Sandhausen
15:30 CEST (UTC+2)	Sickinger (yellow card) 36'	Report	Orbán 19'; Haidara 45'; Nkunku 59'; Szoboszlai 81'	Stadium: BWT-Stadion am Hardtwald; Attendance: 4,067; Referee: Daniel Schlager

26 October 2021 Second round	SV Babelsberg	0–1	RB Leipzig	Potsdam
18:30 CEST (UTC+2)	Wilton (yellow card) 42'; Gencel (yellow card) 49'; Frahn (yellow card) 74'	Report	Szoboszlai 45'	Stadium: Karl-Liebknecht-Stadion; Attendance: 6,218; Referee: Benjamin Cortus

19 January 2022 Round of 16	RB Leipzig	2–0	Hansa Rostock	Leipzig
18:30 CET (UTC+1)	Poulsen 6'; Olmo 82'	Report	Mamba (yellow card) 23'; Bahn (yellow card) 53'	Stadium: Red Bull Arena; Attendance: 1,000; Referee: Sven Jablonski

2 March 2022 Quarter-finals	Hannover 96	0–4	RB Leipzig	Hannover
18:30 CET (UTC+1)	Hult (yellow card) 62'	Report	Nkunku 17', 22'; Simakan (yellow card) 49'; Laimer 67'; Silva 73'	Stadium: HDI-Arena; Attendance: 25,000; Referee: Marco Fritz

20 April 2022 Semi-finals	RB Leipzig	2–1	Union Berlin	Leipzig
20:45 CEST (UTC+2)	Laimer (yellow card) 35'; Silva 61' (pen.); Forsberg 90+3'; Simakan (yellow card) 90+4'	Report	Becker 25'; Knoche (yellow card) 43'; Khedira (yellow card) 80'; Michel (yellow card) 90+5'	Stadium: Red Bull Arena; Attendance: 47,069; Referee: Felix Brych

21 May 2022 Final	SC Freiburg	1–1 (a.e.t.) (2–4 p)	RB Leipzig	Berlin
20:00 CEST (UTC+2)	Eggestein 19'; Kübler (yellow card) 81'; Lienhart (yellow card) 90'; Demirović (yellow card) 113'	Report	Halstenberg (red card) 57'; Simakan (yellow card) 58'; Kampl (yellow card) 60' (yellow-red card) 119'; Nkunku 76'; Forsberg (yellow card) 83'	Stadium: Olympiastadion; Attendance: 74,322; Referee: Sascha Stegemann
	Penalties
	Petersen (penalty scored); Günter (penalty missed); K. Schlotterbeck (penalty scored); Demirović (penalty missed)		(penalty scored) Nkunku; (penalty scored) Orbán; (penalty scored) Olmo; (penalty scored) Henrichs

=== UEFA Champions League ===
==== Group stage ====
The draw for the group stage was held on 26 August 2021.

Pos	Team	Pld	W	D	L	GF	GA	GD	Pts	Qualification	MCI	PAR	RBL	BRU
1	(England) Manchester City	6	4	0	2	18	10	+8	12	Advance to knockout phase	—	2–1	6–3	4–1
2	(France) Paris Saint-Germain	6	3	2	1	13	8	+5	11	Advance to knockout phase	2–0	—	3–2	4–1
3	(Germany) RB Leipzig	6	2	1	3	15	14	+1	7	Transfer to Europa League	2–1	2–2	—	1–2
4	(Belgium) Club Brugge	6	1	1	4	6	20	−14	4		1–5	1–1	0–5	—

Source: UEFA
Rules for classification: Group stage tiebreakers

15 September 2021 1	Manchester City (England)	6–3	(Germany) RB Leipzig	Manchester, England
21:00 CEST (UTC+2)	Zinchenko (yellow card) 12'; Aké 16'; Mukiele 28' (o.g.); Mahrez 45+2' (pen.); Grealish 56'; Cancelo 75'; Gabriel Jesus 86'	Report	Nkunku 42', 51', 73'; Klostermann (yellow card) 45+1'; Adams (yellow card) 49'; Angeliño (yellow card) 58' (yellow-red card) 79'	Stadium: City of Manchester Stadium; Attendance: 38,062; Referee: Serdar Gözübüyük (Netherlands)

28 September 2021 2	RB Leipzig (Germany)	1–2	(Belgium) Club Brugge	Leipzig, Germany
21:00 CEST (UTC+2)	Nkunku 5'	Report	Vanaken 22'; Rits 41'; Balanta (yellow card) 87'; Mignolet (yellow card) 90+6'	Stadium: Red Bull Arena; Attendance: 23,500; Referee: Slavko Vinčić (Slovenia)

19 October 2021 3	Paris Saint-Germain (France)	3–2	(Germany) RB Leipzig	Paris, France
21:00 CEST (UTC+2)	Mbappé 9', (penalty missed) 90+4'; Gueye (yellow card) 48'; Hakimi (yellow card) 64'; Messi 67', 74' (pen.)	Report	Orbán (yellow card) 18'; Silva 28'; Simakan (yellow card) 38'; Mukiele 57'; Adams (yellow card) 84'	Stadium: Parc de Princes; Attendance: 47,359; Referee: Marco Guida (Italy)

3 November 2021 4	RB Leipzig (Germany)	2–2	(France) Paris Saint-Germain	Leipzig, Germany
21:00 CET (UTC+1)	Nkunku 8'; Silva (penalty missed) 12'; Adams (yellow card) 25'; Simakan (yellow card) 69'; Szoboszlai 90+2' (pen.); Poulsen (yellow card) 90+5'	Report	Pereira (yellow card) 10'; Wijnaldum 21', 39'; Kimpembe (yellow card) 32'; Mendes (yellow card) 62'; Neymar (yellow card) 74'; Donnarumma (yellow card) 90+1'; Herrera (yellow card) 90+5'	Stadium: Red Bull Arena; Attendance: 39,794; Referee: Andreas Ekberg (Sweden)

24 November 2021 5	Club Brugge (Belgium)	0–5	(Germany) RB Leipzig	Bruges, Belgium
21:00 CET (UTC+1)	Lang (yellow card) 63'; Balanta (yellow card) 85'; Wesley (yellow card) 86'	Report	Nkunku 12', 90+3'; Forsberg 17' (pen.), 45+1'; Silva 26'; Moriba (yellow card) 86'	Stadium: Jan Breydel Stadium; Attendance: 24,072; Referee: Davide Massa (Italy)

7 December 2021 6	RB Leipzig (Germany)	2–1	(England) Manchester City	Leipzig, Germany
18:45 CET (UTC+1)	Kampl (yellow card) 14'; Szoboszlai 24'; Silva 71'; Adams (yellow card) 90+1'	Report	De Bruyne (yellow card) 30'; Mahrez 76'; Stones (yellow card) 81'; Walker (red card) 82'	Stadium: Red Bull Arena; Attendance: 0 Referee: Sandro Schärer (Switzerland)

=== UEFA Europa League ===
==== Knockout phase ====
===== Knockout round play-offs =====
The draw for the knockout round play-offs was held on 13 December 2021.

17 February 2022 First leg	RB Leipzig (Germany)	2–2	(Spain) Real Sociedad	Leipzig, Germany
21:00 CET (UTC+1)	Nkunku 30'; Forsberg 81' (pen.)	Report	Le Normand 8'; Oyarzabal 64' (pen.)	Stadium: Red Bull Arena; Attendance: 21,113; Referee: Cüneyt Çakır (Turkey)

24 February 2022 Second leg	Real Sociedad (Spain)	1–3 (3–5 agg.)	(Germany) RB Leipzig	San Sebastián, Spain
18:45 CET (UTC+1)	Zubimendi 67'; Januzaj (yellow card) 90'	Report	Silva (penalty missed) 39', 59', (yellow card) 63'; Orbán 39', (yellow card) 72'; Kampl (yellow card) 85'; Forsberg 89' (pen.)	Stadium: Anoeta; Attendance: 30,113; Referee: Anthony Taylor (England)

===== Round of 16 =====
The draw for the round of 16 was held on 25 February 2022. After being drawn against Russian side Spartak Moscow, Leipzig received a bye to the next round following Spartak's expulsion by UEFA and FIFA due to the Russian invasion of Ukraine.

10 March 2022 First leg	~~RB Leipzig~~ (Germany)	Cancelled	(Russia) ~~Spartak Moscow~~	Leipzig, Germany
18:45 CET (UTC+1)		Report		Stadium: Red Bull Arena
Note: On 28 February 2022, following the Russian invasion of Ukraine, FIFA and UEFA suspended Russian clubs and national teams from all competitions. Thus, Leipzig automatically advanced to the quarter-finals.

17 March 2022 Second leg	~~Spartak Moscow~~ (Russia)	Cancelled	(Germany) RB Leipzig	Moscow
--:-- CET (UTC+1)		Report
Note: On 28 February 2022, following the Russian invasion of Ukraine, FIFA and UEFA suspended Russian clubs and national teams from all competitions. Thus, Leipzig automatically advanced to the quarter-finals.

===== Quarter-finals =====
The draw for the quarter-finals was held on 18 March 2022.

7 April 2022 First leg	RB Leipzig (Germany)	1–1	(Italy) Atalanta	Leipzig, Germany
18:45 CEST (UTC+2)	Gvardiol (yellow card) 51'; Silva (penalty missed) 58'; Zappacosta 58' (o.g.); Halstenberg (yellow card) 85'	Report	Palomino (yellow card) 3'; Muriel 17'	Stadium: Red Bull Arena; Attendance: 36,029; Referee: Michael Oliver (England)

14 April 2022 Second leg	Atalanta (Italy)	0–2 (1–3 agg.)	(Germany) RB Leipzig	Bergamo, Italy
18:45 CEST (UTC+2)	Zapata (yellow card) 58'; Freuler (yellow card) 59'; Demiral (yellow card) 60'; Koopmeiners (yellow card) 75'; Hateboer (yellow card) 90+2'; Zappacosta (yellow card) 90+5'	Report	Nkunku 18', 87' (pen.); Henrichs (yellow card) 49'; Orbán (yellow card) 62'; Simakan (yellow card) 90+5'; Kampl (yellow card) 90+6'	Stadium: Stadio Atleti Azzurri d'Italia; Attendance: 17,905; Referee: Antonio Mateu Lahoz (Spain)

===== Semi-finals =====
The draw for the semi-finals was held on 18 March 2022, after the quarter-final draw.

28 April 2022 First leg	RB Leipzig (Germany)	1–0	(Scotland) Rangers	Leipzig, Germany
21:00 CEST (UTC+2)	Angeliño 85'	Report	Goldson (yellow card) 90+2'; Tavernier (yellow card) 90+3'	Stadium: Red Bull Arena; Attendance: 40,303; Referee: Benoît Bastien (France)

5 May 2022 Second leg	Rangers (Scotland)	3–1 (3–2 agg.)	(Germany) RB Leipzig	Glasgow, Scotland
20:00 BST (UTC+1)	Tavernier 19'; Kamara 24'; Bassey (yellow card) 26'; Goldson (yellow card) 31'; Barišić (yellow card) 44'; Lundstram 81'	Report	Kampl (yellow card) 52'; Nkunku 71'	Stadium: Ibrox Stadium; Attendance: 49,397; Referee: Artur Soares Dias (Portugal)

== Statistics ==
=== Appearances and goals ===
No.	Pos	Nat	Player	Total		Bundesliga		DFB-Pokal		Champions League		Europa League	
No.	Pos	Nat	Player	Apps	Goals	Apps	Goals	Apps	Goals	Apps	Goals	Apps	Goals
Goalkeepers
1	GK	(Hungary) HUN	Péter Gulácsi	49	0	33	0	5	0	5	0	6	0
13	GK	(Germany) GER	Philipp Tschauner	1	0	0+1	0	0	0	0	0	0	0
31	GK	(Spain) ESP	Josep Martínez	3	0	1	0	1	0	1	0	0	0
Defenders
2	DF	(France) FRA	Mohamed Simakan	41	1	23+5	1	6	0	3+1	0	3	0
3	DF	(Spain) ESP	Angeliño	45	3	26+3	2	5	0	5	0	5+1	1
4	DF	(Hungary) HUN	Willi Orbán	44	5	30	2	6	1	4	0	4	2
16	DF	(Germany) GER	Lukas Klostermann	37	0	17+6	0	2+1	0	5	0	5+1	0
22	DF	(France) FRA	Nordi Mukiele	38	2	21+7	1	1+1	0	6	1	0+2	0
23	DF	(Germany) GER	Marcel Halstenberg	15	1	5+3	1	1+2	0	0	0	1+3	0
32	DF	(Croatia) CRO	Joško Gvardiol	46	2	28+1	2	3+2	0	3+3	0	6	0
35	DF	(Netherlands) NED	Solomon Owusu Bonnah	3	0	0+1	0	0+1	0	0+1	0	0	0
37	DF	(Germany) GER	Sidney Raebiger	2	0	0+1	0	0+1	0	0	0	0	0
39	DF	(Germany) GER	Benjamin Henrichs	37	3	12+10	3	5	0	0+4	0	5+1	0
Midfielders
8	MF	(Mali) MLI	Amadou Haidara	28	4	15+5	3	1+1	1	1+3	0	0+2	0
14	MF	(United States) USA	Tyler Adams	37	0	12+12	0	3+1	0	3+2	0	2+2	0
17	MF	(Hungary) HUN	Dominik Szoboszlai	45	10	15+16	6	2+3	2	2+2	2	1+4	0
18	MF	(France) FRA	Christopher Nkunku	52	35	31+3	20	5+1	4	6	7	6	4
25	MF	(Spain) ESP	Dani Olmo	31	4	6+13	3	2+2	1	1+1	0	6	0
27	MF	(Austria) AUT	Konrad Laimer	43	5	15+11	4	3+2	1	6	0	6	0
44	MF	(Slovenia) SLO	Kevin Kampl	40	0	25+2	0	5	0	3	0	5	0
46	MF	(Germany) GER	Ben Klefisch	0	0	0	0	0	0	0	0	0	0
Forwards
9	FW	(Denmark) DEN	Yussuf Poulsen	37	7	12+13	6	2+1	1	1+3	0	1+4	0
10	FW	(Sweden) SWE	Emil Forsberg	46	11	20+11	6	2+3	1	5+1	2	0+4	2
33	FW	(Portugal) POR	André Silva	51	17	24+9	11	5+1	2	5+1	3	4+2	1
38	FW	(Spain) ESP	Hugo Novoa	12	1	1+7	1	1+1	0	0+1	0	0+1	0
Players transferred out during the season
7	MF	(Austria) AUT	Marcel Sabitzer	2	0	0+2	0	0	0	0	0	0	0
11	FW	(South Korea) KOR	Hwang Hee-chan	3	0	0+2	0	0+1	0	0	0	0	0
19	FW	(Norway) NOR	Alexander Sørloth	0	0	0	0	0	0	0	0	0	0
21	FW	(Netherlands) NED	Brian Brobbey	14	0	1+8	0	0+1	0	1+3	0	0	0
26	MF	(Guinea) GUI	Ilaix Moriba	6	0	0+2	0	0+1	0	0+3	0	0	0
41	FW	(Nigeria) NGR	Ademola Lookman	0	0	0	0	0	0	0	0	0	0
43	DF	(Uruguay) URU	Marcelo Saracchi	0	0	0	0	0	0	0	0	0	0
47	MF	(Germany) GER	Joscha Wosz	1	0	0+1	0	0	0	0	0	0	0

Last updated: 21 May 2022
Source: Competitions

=== Goalscorers ===
As of 21 May 2022

Rank	No.	Pos.	Nat.	Player	Bundesliga	DFB-Pokal	Champions League	Europa League	Total
1	20	MF	(France)	Christopher Nkunku	20	4	7	4	35
2	33	FW	(Portugal)	André Silva	11	2	3	1	17
3	10	MF	(Sweden)	Emil Forsberg	6	1	2	2	11
4	17	MF	(Hungary)	Dominik Szoboszlai	6	2	2	0	10
5	9	FW	(Denmark)	Yussuf Poulsen	6	1	0	0	7
6	4	DF	(Hungary)	Willi Orbán	2	1	0	2	5
6	27	MF	(Austria)	Konrad Laimer	4	1	0	0	5
8	8	MF	(Mali)	Amadou Haidara	3	1	0	0	4
8	25	MF	(Spain)	Dani Olmo	3	1	0	0	4
10	3	DF	(Spain)	Angeliño	2	0	0	1	3
10	39	DF	(Germany)	Benjamin Henrichs	3	0	0	0	3
12	22	DF	(France)	Nordi Mukiele	1	0	1	0	2
12	32	DF	(Croatia)	Joško Gvardiol	2	0	0	0	2
14	2	DF	(France)	Mohamed Simakan	1	0	0	0	1
14	23	DF	(Germany)	Marcel Halstenberg	1	0	0	0	1
14	38	FW	(Spain)	Hugo Novoa	1	0	0	0	1
Own goals					0	0	0	0	0
Totals					72	14	15	10	111
