= Domenico Tedesco =

Italian-German football manager (born 1985)

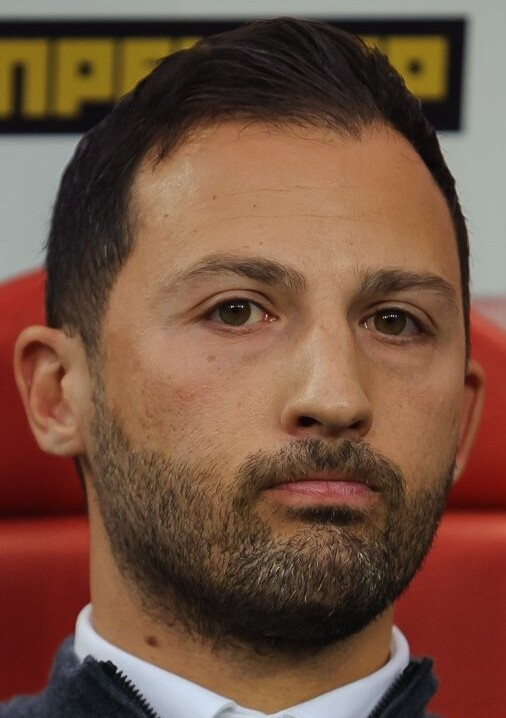
- Tedesco in 2019

Personal information
- Full name: Domenico Tedesco
- Date of birth: 12 September 1985 (age 41)
- Place of birth: Rossano, Italy
- Height: 1.78 m (5 ft 10 in)
- Position: Defender

Senior career*
Years	Team	Apps	(Gls)
- ASV Aichwald
- FV Zuffenhausen
- ASV Aichwald

Managerial career
- 2017: Erzgebirge Aue
- 2017–2019: Schalke 04
- 2019–2021: Spartak Moscow
- 2021–2022: RB Leipzig
- 2023–2025: Belgium
- 2025–2026: Fenerbahçe
- 2026: Bologna
- * Club domestic league appearances and goals

Domenico Tedesco (Italian pronunciation: [doˈmeːniko teˈdesko]; born 12 September 1985) is an Italian-German professional football manager who was most recently the manager of Serie A club Bologna.

A former youth coach at VfB Stuttgart and Hoffenheim, he made his senior breakthrough at Erzgebirge Aue in March 2017, keeping the last-placed 2. Bundesliga side up. He was appointed by Schalke 04 later that year and finished second in the Bundesliga in his debut season, also reaching the UEFA Champions League knockout phase, before leaving in March 2019.

Tedesco then coached Spartak Moscow (2019–2021), finishing second in the Russian Premier League in 2020–21. In December 2021, he took over RB Leipzig, winning the club’s first major trophy, the 2022 DFB-Pokal, and reaching the UEFA Europa League semi-finals, departing in September 2022.

In February 2023, he became head coach of the Belgium national team. After completing the qualification campaign for UEFA Euro 2024 unbeaten, the team exited the main tournament in the round of 16. Tedesco left the post in January 2025. In September 2025, ten days after José Mourinho's departure, Tedesco was appointed as the new manager of Fenerbahçe on a two-year contract, which was abrogated in April 2026.

== Early life ==
Domenico Tedesco was born on 12 September 1985 in Rossano, Province of Cosenza, Calabria, Italy. When he was two years old, his family emigrated to Esslingen in the German state of Baden-Württemberg; he later acquired German citizenship.

As a youth and amateur he played locally, including for ASV Aichwald in the Kreisliga A in the Stuttgart region.

Alongside his early coaching work Tedesco completed a co-operative bachelor’s degree in business engineering in Stuttgart and later a master’s degree in innovation/industrial management; during this period he also worked in the automotive sector in Baden-Württemberg.

On 1 July 2008, he joined the youth department of VfB Stuttgart as an assistant coach under Thomas Schneider; from 2013 he served as assistant of the under-17 team. After the 2014–15 season he left Stuttgart to become a youth coach at 1899 Hoffenheim, and ahead of 2016–17 he was promoted to the club’s under-19 side.

== Coaching career ==
=== Erzgebirge Aue ===
On 8 March 2017, the then bottom-placed Erzgebirge Aue appointed Tedesco as head coach, tasking him with avoiding relegation. He made an immediate impact, collecting 13 points from his first five league matches and stabilising the side with a compact, possession-aware 3-/5-at-the-back structure. Aue ultimately finished 14th and stayed up, with Tedesco recording six wins, two draws and three defeats (6–2–3) across his 11 league fixtures in charge.

=== Schalke 04 ===
Schalke appointed Tedesco head coach on 9 June 2017 on a two-year contract after his breakout spell at Erzgebirge Aue. His debut campaign quickly produced a defining moment in the Revierderby on 25 November 2017, when Schalke came from 0–4 down at half-time to draw 4–4 away to Borussia Dortmund; the comeback was widely hailed in the German press. Tedesco led Schalke to second place in the 2017–18 Bundesliga, the club’s best league finish since 2009–10, and qualification for the UEFA Champions League. Schalke also reached the DFB-Pokal semi-finals, losing 0–1 at home to Eintracht Frankfurt on 18 April 2018.

The following season began poorly. Schalke opened the 2018–19 Bundesliga with five straight defeats—the worst start in the club’s top-flight history—and slipped toward the relegation places. Despite advancing from the Champions League group stage, Schalke were eliminated in the round of 16 by Manchester City, losing 2–3 in Gelsenkirchen and 0–7 in Manchester (10–2 on aggregate). Amid a seven-match winless league run, Schalke relieved Tedesco of his duties on 14 March 2019.

=== Spartak Moscow ===
On 14 October 2019, Tedesco was appointed head coach of Spartak Moscow on a contract running to June 2021, replacing interim coach Sergei Kuznetsov. In the pandemic-interrupted 2019–20 Russian Premier League, Spartak finished seventh after the summer restart period.

On 16 December 2020, Tedesco and the club confirmed he would not extend his deal beyond the end of the 2020–21 season, citing family reasons and COVID-19 travel impacts. Spartak ended 2020–21 as league runners-up, clinching second place with a 2–2 draw with Akhmat Grozny on the final day, which carried UEFA Champions League third-qualifying-round entry. He left the club upon expiry of his contract in June 2021, with Spartak publicly thanking him for returning the team to European qualification.

=== RB Leipzig ===
On 9 December 2021, Tedesco was appointed head coach of RB Leipzig, replacing Jesse Marsch on a deal running to 2023. He inherited a team in mid-table and, following a strong Rückrunde, guided Leipzig to a fourth-place finish and qualification for the UEFA Champions League. In Europe, Leipzig reached the club’s first continental semi-final, losing 3–2 on aggregate to Rangers in the 2021–22 UEFA Europa League (1–0 H, 1–3 A).

On 21 May 2022, Leipzig won the DFB-Pokal for the first time in the club’s history, defeating SC Freiburg on penalties after a 1–1 draw a.e.t. at the Olympiastadion; Péter Gulácsi saved the decisive spot-kick and Christopher Nkunku scored Leipzig’s equaliser. Under Tedesco, Nkunku produced the most prolific season of his career and was voted the Bundesliga Player of the Season for 2021–22.

Tedesco’s Leipzig frequently alternated between a back-three (3-4-2-1 / 3-4-1-2) and a back-four, with an emphasis on compact pressing and fast transitional attacks built around Christopher Nkunku, Dominik Szoboszlai, Dani Olmo and the ball-progression of centre-back Joško Gvardiol.

The 2022–23 campaign began with a 5–3 defeat to Bayern München in the DFL-Supercup, a 4–0 Bundesliga loss away to Eintracht Frankfurt, and a 4–1 home defeat by Shakhtar Donetsk on Matchday 1 of the UEFA Champions League group stage. On 7 September 2022, the club parted company with Tedesco; he was succeeded by Marco Rose the following day.

=== Belgium ===
On 8 February 2023, Tedesco was appointed head coach of the Belgium national football team on a contract running through UEFA Euro 2024. He began with a 3–0 away win over Sweden in qualifying (Romelu Lukaku hat-trick) and a 3–2 friendly victory away to Germany—the Belgians’ first win over Germany since 1954.

Belgium topped their UEFA EURO 2024 qualifying group unbeaten (W6 D2), finishing above Austria and Sweden with 22 goals scored and four conceded. In June 2023, Thibaut Courtois withdrew from the squad after a dispute around the captaincy; Tedesco said the goalkeeper had left the camp ahead of the Estonia qualifier, while Courtois later issued his own account of events.

At Euro 2024, Belgium finished second in Group E with four points but scored only two goals across three matches, losing 1–0 to Slovakia, beating Romania 2–0 and drawing 0–0 with Ukraine. Belgium were eliminated in the round of 16, losing 1–0 to France in Düsseldorf after an 85th-minute deflected strike from Randal Kolo Muani.

On 17 January 2025, the Royal Belgian FA announced that Tedesco had been relieved of his duties following a post-tournament review.

=== Fenerbahçe ===
On 9 September 2025, Fenerbahçe confirmed the appointment of Tedesco as first-team manager on a two-year contract. Five days later, he managed his first match, securing a 1–0 victory over Trabzonspor. Two months later, on 2 November, despite falling behind 2–0 away to their arch-rival Beşiktaş in a 2–3 Süper Lig match, he contributed to their 3–2 win with his substitutions and changes in the game plan. Fenerbahçe fans have shared on social media that Tedesco physically resembles the Ottoman Emperor Mehmed the Conqueror. After the Beşiktaş derby victory on 2 November 2025, Fenerbahçe also shared posts on their social media accounts that evoke this similarity.

On 10 January 2026, Tedesco won his first trophy with Fenerbahçe after defeating Galatasaray 2–0 in the Turkish Super Cup. With a dominant tactical performance and effective in-game management, Fenerbahçe secured their first major title of the season, marking a significant milestone in Tedesco’s tenure at the club by ending their 11-year wait for the Super Cup. Later that year, on 27 April, a day after a 3–0 defeat to Galatasaray at Rams Park with only three matches remaining, he was dismissed, having fallen seven points behind their rivals in the league table and effectively ending any realistic hopes of securing the title.

=== Bologna ===
On 2 June 2026, Tedesco was announced as manager of Bologna on a two year contract, with the option on a further season. On 16 September, the club announced they had parted ways with Tedesco, after just four matches.

== Coaching philosophy ==
Tedesco describes his preferred game model as one that “divides the space well,” with the ball and the team constantly prepared to attack or control transitions: “I like to compare it to a boxer who should never let his guard down… we want to win the ball back as often as possible because we love attacking – although always with a certain balance and structure.”

Across his teams, he has favoured flexible back-three structures (3–4–2–1 or 3–5–2) that create a strong “rest-defence” behind the ball (typically three plus two in midfield) to secure counter-protection while allowing the wing-backs to advance high and wide. In possession his sides prioritize occupation of the half-spaces, frequent third-man combinations and rotations between the inside forwards and wing-backs to unbalance opposition back lines; out of possession they use height-adjusted pressing (from high press to compact mid-block) with clear triggers to jump on backward or square passes and immediate counter-pressing on ball loss.

Set-plays are a recurrent weapon: Tedesco devotes specific micro-cycles to dead-ball rehearsal and opponent-specific routines, something highlighted during RB Leipzig’s 2021–22 run (goal patterns from rehearsed corners and second phases). He is also known for heavily data-supported preparation (opponent tendencies, set-play databases, pressing traps), for tailored individual development plans, and for multilingual, detail-rich communication on the training ground—factors frequently cited by players such as Christopher Nkunku, Joško Gvardiol and Dominik Szoboszlai when discussing their improvement under his staff.

While his teams can control games with longer build-up, Tedesco has repeatedly stressed “game adaptability” over dogma—altering pressing heights, matching opposition shapes with situational back-four or back-three shifts, and accepting more direct attacks when space behind the line can be exploited.

== Personal life ==
Tedesco holds dual Italian–German citizenship and is multilingual, speaking Italian, German, English, French and Spanish; he also acquired basic Russian during his stint at Spartak. The surname “Tedesco” literally means “German” in Italian, a fact often noted in profiles of the coach. He is married and has two daughters, and during his time in Germany has been based with his family in Stuttgart.

== Managerial statistics ==
As of match played 13 September 2026

Managerial record by team and tenure
Team	Nat.	From	To	Record								Ref.
Team	Nat.	From	To	M	W	D	L	GF	GA	GD	Win %	Ref.
Erzgebirge Aue	(Germany)	8 March 2017	9 June 2017	11	6	2	3	14	10	+4	54.55	
Schalke 04	(Germany)	9 June 2017	14 March 2019	75	33	17	25	102	98	+4	44.00	
Spartak Moscow	(Russia)	14 October 2019	24 May 2021	54	27	10	17	89	64	+25	50.00	
RB Leipzig	(Germany)	9 December 2021	7 September 2022	38	20	9	9	84	46	+38	52.63	
Belgium	(Belgium)	8 February 2023	17 January 2025	24	12	6	6	41	19	+22	50.00	
Fenerbahçe	(Turkey)	9 September 2025	27 April 2026	45	26	12	7	87	45	+42	57.78	
Bologna	(Italy)	2 June 2026	16 September 2026	4	0	1	3	2	5	−3	0.00	
Total				251	124	57	70	419	288	+131	49.40	—

== Honours ==
Schalke 04

- Bundesliga: runner-up: 2017–18

Spartak Moscow

- Russian Premier League: runner-up: 2020–21

RB Leipzig

- DFB-Pokal: 2021–22

Fenerbahçe

- Turkish Super Cup: 2025
