= Yussuf Poulsen =

Danish footballer (born 1994)

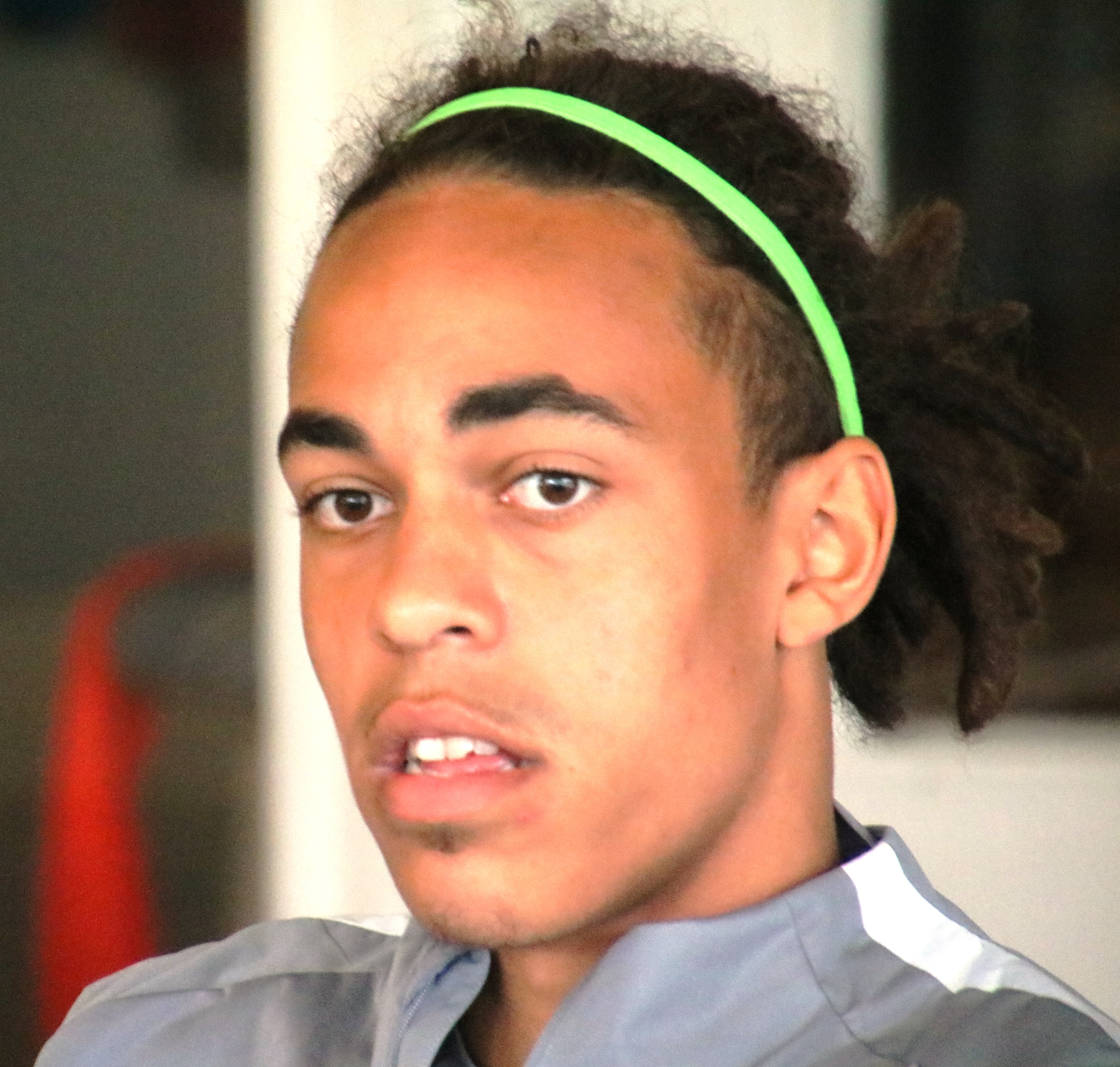
- Poulsen in 2016

Personal information
- Full name: Yussuf Yurary Poulsen
- Date of birth: 15 June 1994 (age 32)
- Place of birth: Copenhagen, Denmark
- Height: 1.92 m (6 ft 4 in)
- Position: Forward

Team information
- Current team: Hamburger SV
- Number: 15

Youth career
- Skjold
- –2011: Lyngby

Senior career*
Years	Team	Apps	(Gls)
2011–2013	Lyngby	35	(11)
2013–2025	RB Leipzig	330	(77)
2025–	Hamburger SV	21	(3)

International career
2010	Denmark U16	1	(0)
2010–2011	Denmark U17	19	(2)
2011–2012	Denmark U18	7	(10)
2012–2013	Denmark U19	12	(8)
2012	Denmark U20	3	(0)
2013–2015	Denmark U21	15	(4)
2013	Denmark League XI	1	(0)
2013–2024	Denmark	86	(14)
- * Club domestic league appearances and goals as of 17:30, 24 October 2026 (UTC)

Yussuf Yurary Poulsen (Danish pronunciation: [ˈjusuf ˈpʰʌwlsn̩]; born 15 June 1994) is a Danish professional footballer who plays as a forward for Bundesliga club Hamburger SV.

After starting his professional career with Lyngby, he transferred to RB Leipzig in 2013, helping them from the 3. Liga to the Bundesliga in the space of three seasons. He holds the RB Leipzig record for most appearances with over 300, and has scored over 80 goals for the club. He played in the DFB-Pokal final in 2019 and 2021.

Poulsen made his international debut for Denmark in 2014 and has earned over 80 caps. He was part of their squad at the FIFA World Cup in 2018 and 2022, and the UEFA European Championship in 2020 and 2024, reaching the semi-finals of the 2020 tournament.

== Early life ==
Poulsen was born to a Tanzanian father and a Danish mother. His father worked on a container ship, oscillating between Tanga and Denmark before he settled in Copenhagen. He died of cancer when Poulsen was six years old.

== Club career ==
=== Early career ===
Poulsen began playing football at Skjold. At first he was a defensive player and in Kenneth Zohore he had a teammate, with whom he was to play later in the Danish youth national teams. After Zohoré joined Copenhagen, Poulsen was moved to a position as a striker.

=== Lyngby ===
At the age of 14 he joined the youth ranks of Lyngby. He played his first match as a senior on 4 December 2011, when he came on the pitch against Horsens after 84 minutes, as a substitute for Mathias Tauber. Poulsen did not immediately establish himself in the starting eleven, and he was at the end of the season only on five appearances. His club, Lyngby were also relegated from Superligaen. 5 August 2012 he scored his first goal at senior level, as well as for his club, when he in the second match in the 1. Division (second Danish league) scored the 1-0 winning goal against AB. He was a regular player in the starting 11, and played 32 matches, scoring eleven goals.

=== RB Leipzig ===
His achievements attracted the interest of foreign and domestic clubs, and on 3 July 2013, he signed a contract with the newly promoted 3. Liga German side RB Leipzig. He made his club debut on 19 July 2013 in a 1–0 win at Hallescher FC, and scored his first goals in a 2–0 home win over Rot-Weiss Essen on 24 August, and netted two more in the final game on 10 May 2014 to win 3–1 against Stuttgarter Kickers. He finished the 2013–14 season with 10 goals in 36 appearances as his team were promoted as runners-up.

In his first season in the 2. Bundesliga, Poulsen scored 12 goals in 32 appearances during the 2014–15 season as his team came fifth. He was sent off on 23 February in a 1–1 draw at Eintracht Braunschweig.

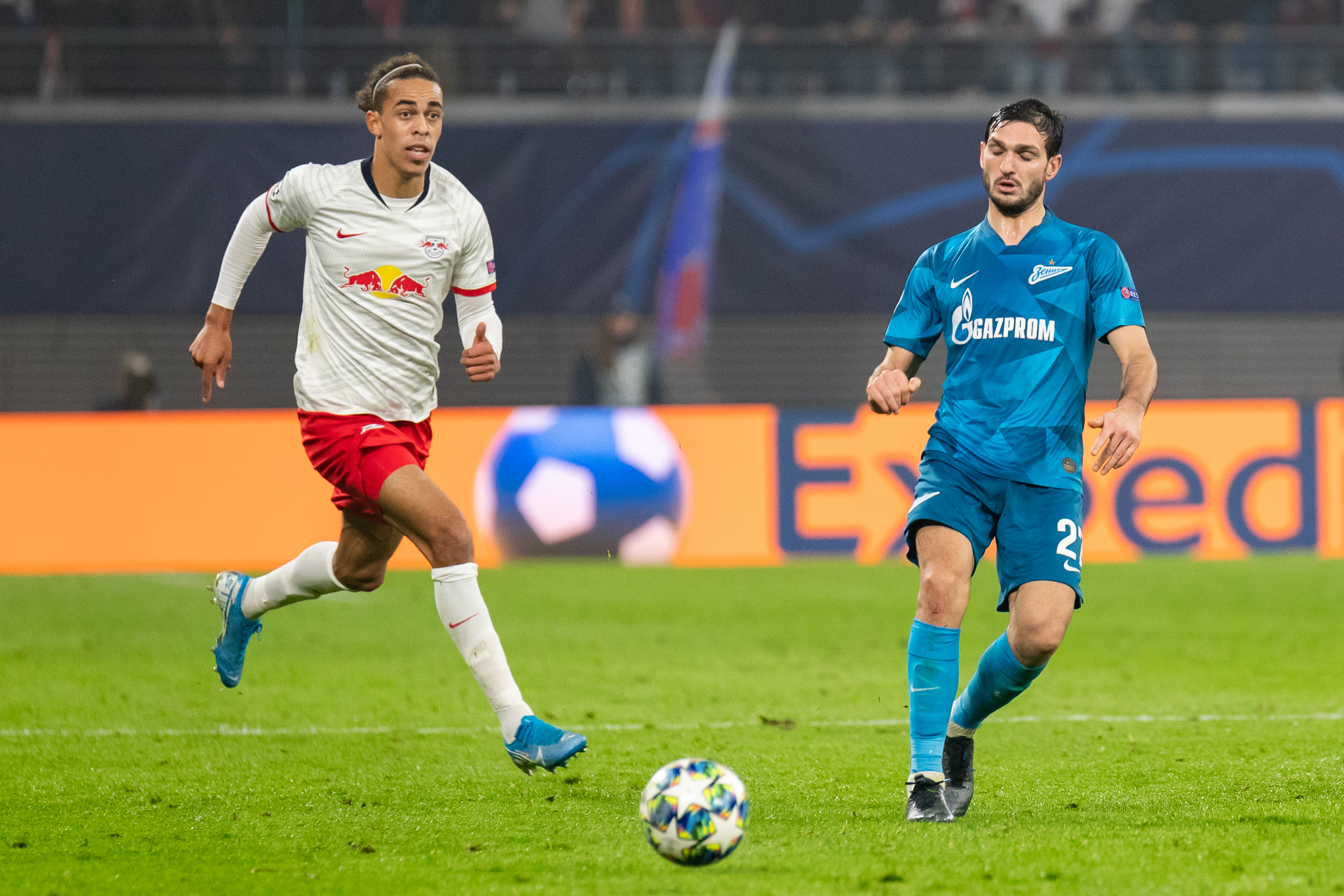
Poulsen in action for Leipzig against Zenit in October 2019

Poulsen scored seven goals in 32 appearances during the 2015–16 season as RB Leipzig won promotion as runners-up to SC Freiburg. On 28 August 2016, he played in RB Leipzig's first Bundesliga match, and in the sixth match of the 2016–17 season, he scored his first Bundesliga goal in a 2–1 victory at home against FC Augsburg on 30 September. He finished the 2016–17 season with five goals in 30 appearances.

Poulsen finished the 2017–18 season five goals in 41 appearances. This included one on 14 October 2017 in a 3–2 win at Borussia Dortmund, the hosts' first home defeat in 41 games.

On 30 March 2019, during a 5–0 win over Hertha BSC, he became the first-ever Leipzig player to score a hat-trick in the Bundesliga and in the process helped the club record its 50th ever win in the competition. His treble also took him to 15 league goals for the campaign which meant he became only the third Danish player, after Ebbe Sand and Allan Simonsen to score more than 14 Bundesliga goals in a single season. In the same month, he extended his contract by a year to 2022. His team were runners-up in the 2019 DFB-Pokal Final; he scored in 3–1 wins in the first round at Viktoria Köln and the semi-final at Hamburger SV.

Poulsen became the first Leipzig player to 250 appearances on 24 May 2020, when he scored in a 5–0 win at Mainz 05. He was then ruled out for the rest of the season with ankle ligament damage. He scored five times on the way to the 2021 DFB-Pokal final, including two in a 4–0 home win over VfL Bochum in the last 16. On 28 October 2021, he reached 300 matches in a 2–1 home loss to Club Brugge in the Champions League group stage.

=== Hamburger SV ===
On 13 July 2025, after 12 years in Leipzig, Poulsen signed with fellow Bundesliga club Hamburger SV. A month later on 13 August, he was named as the club's captain ahead of the 2025–26 season. His debut for the club was delayed while recovering from injury before he made his first appearance for the club in a scoreless draw against Borussia Mönchengladbach on 24 August, coming into the match as a substitute. On 7 December, he scored his first goal for the club in the Nordderby. Coming on as a substitute in the 83rd minute, Poulsen scored with his first touch of the ball in the 84th minute, giving Hamburger a 3–2 win over rival Werder Bremen.

The first half of the 2025–26 season for Poulsen saw him miss regular playing time due to a series of injuries. After missing games early in the season with an undisclosed injury, he was sidelined again from December to February 2026 with an ankle injury. In March, after injuring his thigh during training, it was confirmed he would miss additional time. He returned to the team on 2 May, playing for seven minutes in a 2–1 win. He finished the season with 16 total appearances and one goal for the club.

== International career ==
Poulsen was eligible to play for Tanzania but did not receive any offers from the Tanzanian federation; as a result, he chose to represent his native Denmark. He made his debut for the Danish national team on 30 January 2013 against Mexico. On 13 June 2015, he scored his first goal for his country, against Serbia in a 2–0 win. Poulsen was selected in Denmark's squad for the 2016 Summer Olympics, however he rejected the call-up in order to cement his place at Leipzig. In May 2018, he was named in Denmark's 23-man squad for the 2018 FIFA World Cup in Russia. On 16 June, he scored the lone goal in their opening game against Peru, and was named man of the match. Earlier in the game he conceded a penalty with a foul on Christian Cueva, which the Peruvian missed.

Poulsen was part of the Danish squad that reached the semi-finals of UEFA Euro 2020 in the summer of 2021. He scored his first goal in the European Championship in a 2–1 defeat to Belgium on 17 June, adding another four days later in a 4–1 win over Russia. He was also part of the Danish squad for the 2022 FIFA World Cup in Qatar.

== Career statistics ==
=== Club ===
As of match played 24 October 2026

Appearances and goals by club, season and competition
Club	Season	League			National cup (Note: Includes Danish Cup, DFB-Pokal)		Europe		Other		Total	
Club	Season	Division	Apps	Goals	Apps	Goals	Apps	Goals	Apps	Goals	Apps	Goals
Lyngby	2011–12	Danish Superliga	5	0	0	0	—		—		5	0
Lyngby	2012–13	Danish 1st Division	30	11	2	1	—		—		32	12
Lyngby	Total		35	11	2	1	—		—		37	12
RB Leipzig	2013–14	3. Liga	36	10	1	0	—		—		37	10
RB Leipzig	2014–15	2. Bundesliga	29	11	3	1	—		—		32	12
RB Leipzig	2015–16	2. Bundesliga	32	7	2	0	—		—		34	7
RB Leipzig	2016–17	Bundesliga	29	5	1	0	—		—		30	5
RB Leipzig	2017–18	Bundesliga	30	4	2	1	9 (Note: Four appearances in UEFA Champions League, five appearances in UEFA Europa League)	0	—		41	5
RB Leipzig	2018–19	Bundesliga	31	15	6	2	8 (Note: Appearances in UEFA Europa League)	2	—		45	19
RB Leipzig	2019–20	Bundesliga	22	5	3	0	8 (Note: Appearances in UEFA Champions League)	0	—		33	5
RB Leipzig	2020–21	Bundesliga	27	5	6	5	8	1	—		41	11
RB Leipzig	2021–22	Bundesliga	25	6	3	1	9 (Note: Four appearances in UEFA Champions League, five appearances in UEFA Europa League)	0	—		37	7
RB Leipzig	2022–23	Bundesliga	19	2	4	2	5	0	0	0	28	4
RB Leipzig	2023–24	Bundesliga	28	5	2	0	7	0	1 (Note: Appearance in DFL-Supercup)	0	38	5
RB Leipzig	2024–25	Bundesliga	22	2	1	2	6	1	—		29	5
RB Leipzig	Total		330	77	34	14	60	4	1	0	425	95
Hamburger SV	2025–26	Bundesliga	15	1	1	0	—		—		16	1
Hamburger SV	2026–27	Bundesliga	6	2	1	0	—		—		7	2
Hamburger SV	Total		21	3	2	0	—		—		23	3
Career total			386	91	38	15	60	4	1	0	485	110

=== International ===
Appearances and goals by national team and year
National team	Year	Apps	Goals
Denmark	2013	1	0
Denmark	2014	3	0
Denmark	2015	8	2
Denmark	2016	7	1
Denmark	2017	6	0
Denmark	2018	12	2
Denmark	2019	7	2
Denmark	2020	7	0
Denmark	2021	15	4
Denmark	2022	3	0
Denmark	2023	7	1
Denmark	2024	11	2
Total		86	14

Denmark score listed first, score column indicates score after each Poulsen goal

International goals by date, venue, cap, opponent, score, result and competition
No.	Date	Venue	Cap	Opponent	Score	Result	Competition
1	13 June 2015	Parken Stadium, Copenhagen, Denmark	5	Serbia	1–0	2–0	UEFA Euro 2016 qualifying
2	17 November 2015	Parken Stadium, Copenhagen, Denmark	11	Sweden	1–2	2–2	UEFA Euro 2016 qualifying
3	8 October 2016	National Stadium, Warsaw, Poland	16	Poland	2–3	2–3	2018 FIFA World Cup qualification
4	9 June 2018	Brøndby Stadium, Brøndby, Denmark	28	Mexico	1–0	2–0	Friendly
5	16 June 2018	Mordovia Arena, Saransk, Russia	29	Peru	1–0	1–0	2018 FIFA World Cup
6	10 June 2019	Parken Stadium, Copenhagen, Denmark	39	Georgia	4–1	5–1	UEFA Euro 2020 qualifying
7	12 October 2019	Parken Stadium, Copenhagen, Denmark	42	Switzerland	1–0	1–0	UEFA Euro 2020 qualifying
8	2 June 2021	Tivoli Stadion Tirol, Innsbruck, Austria	53	Germany	1–1	1–1	Friendly
9	17 June 2021	Parken Stadium, Copenhagen, Denmark	56	Belgium	1–0	1–2	UEFA Euro 2020
10	21 June 2021	Parken Stadium, Copenhagen, Denmark	57	Russia	2–0	4–1	UEFA Euro 2020
11	7 September 2021	Parken Stadium, Copenhagen, Denmark	62	Israel	1–0	5–0	2022 FIFA World Cup qualification
12	17 October 2023	San Marino Stadium, Serravalle, San Marino	73	San Marino	2–1	2–1	UEFA Euro 2024 qualifying
13	8 June 2024	Brøndby Stadium, Brøndby, Denmark	79	Norway	3–1	3–1	Friendly
14	8 September 2024	Parken Stadium, Copenhagen, Denmark	84	Serbia	2–0	2–0	2024–25 UEFA Nations League

== Honours ==
RB Leipzig

- DFB-Pokal: 2021–22, 2022–23; runner-up: 2018–19, 2020–21
- DFL-Supercup: 2023

Individual

- Bundesliga Goal of the Month: October 2020

== Personal life ==
In 2015, Poulsen founded a café in Copenhagen called Social with his friends Sebastian Streit Jeppesen and Frederik Nemo Andersen. The café is known for its coffee and vegan food.
