= Joško Gvardiol =

Croatian footballer (born 2002)

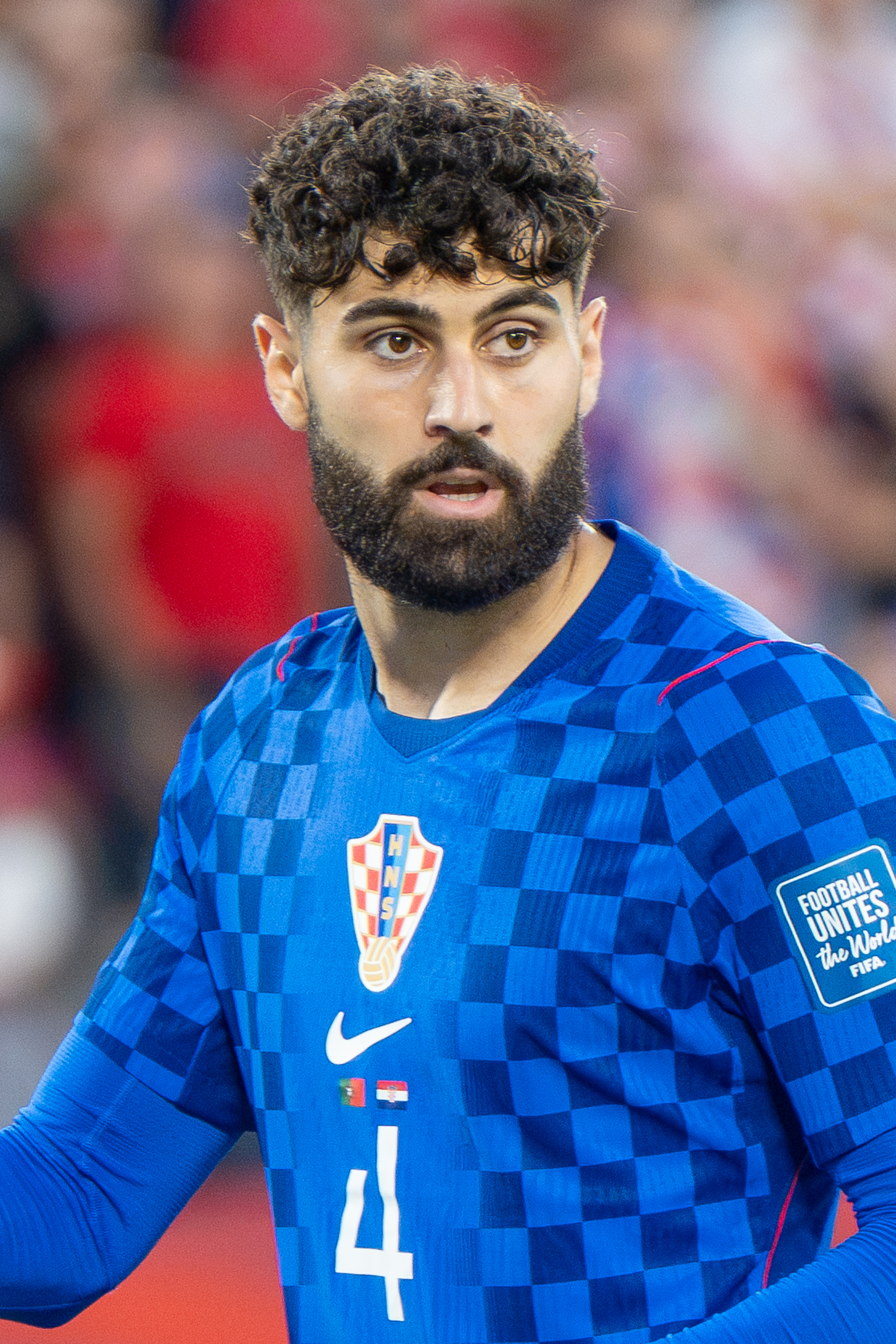
- Gvardiol with Croatia at the 2026 FIFA World Cup

Personal information
- Full name: Joško Gvardiol
- Date of birth: 23 January 2002 (age 24)
- Place of birth: Zagreb, Croatia
- Height: 1.85 m (6 ft 1 in)
- Positions: Centre-back; left-back

Team information
- Current team: Manchester City
- Number: 24

Youth career
- 2009–2010: Trešnjevka
- 2010–2019: Dinamo Zagreb

Senior career*
| Years | Team | Apps | (Gls) |
| 2019–2020 | Dinamo Zagreb II | 4 | (0) |
| 2019–2020 | Dinamo Zagreb | 13 | (1) |
| 2020–2023 | RB Leipzig | 59 | (3) |
| 2020–2021 | → Dinamo Zagreb (loan) | 23 | (2) |
| 2023– | Manchester City | 88 | (12) |

International career^{‡}
| 2016 | Croatia U14 | 3 | (1) |
| 2018 | Croatia U16 | 3 | (0) |
| 2018–2019 | Croatia U17 | 8 | (2) |
| 2019 | Croatia U19 | 5 | (0) |
| 2019–2021 | Croatia U21 | 6 | (1) |
| 2021– | Croatia | 58 | (4) |
Medal record
Men's football
Representing Croatia
FIFA World Cup
| Third place | 2022 Qatar |
- * Club domestic league appearances and goals as of 23:51, 20 September 2026 (UTC) ‡ National team caps and goals as of 23:23, 15 November 2026 (UTC)

Joško Gvardiol (Croatian pronunciation: [jôʃko ɡʋârdioːl]; born 23 January 2002) is a Croatian professional footballer who plays as a centre-back or left-back for Premier League club Manchester City and the Croatia national team. He is known for his on-pitch composure, precise passing, and defensive reliability.

A product of Dinamo Zagreb youth academy, Gvardiol made his professional debut for the club in 2019, and went on to win two league titles as well as the Croatian Cup. He moved to Bundesliga club RB Leipzig in 2021, where he won two DFB-Pokals before he was signed by Manchester City in 2023 for £77 million, making him the most expensive defender in footballing history.

A former Croatian youth international, Gvardiol made his debut for the senior team in 2021. He represented them at the UEFA European Championship in 2020 and 2024, and the FIFA World Cup in 2022 and 2026. At his first World Cup in 2022, he helped the team secure a third place finish, earning his first World Cup medal.

== Early and personal life ==
Gvardiol was born on 23 January 2002 in Srednjaci, a neighbourhood of Zagreb, Croatia, where he was raised. His father, Tihomir, a native of Novigrad near Zadar, works as a fisherman. His mother, Sanja, a native of the Srednjaci, works as an employee of a wholesale company. His older sisters Lorena and Franka are a fashion model and a handball player, respectively.

As a youth footballer for Dinamo Zagreb, Gvardiol struggled with playing time and initially considered quitting football to sell fish. In an interview with BBC sports Gvardiol also mentioned that he considered switching to basketball, since many of his friends played basketball at the time. However, he decided to continue his career after a family friend drew up a mental map to encourage him.

== Club career ==
=== Early career ===
Gvardiol started playing football at the age of seven when his father Tihomir, once an amateur player in his native Novigrad, took him to Trešnjevka. While there, he was spotted by Lokomotiva and Zagreb. However, at the last minute, he received an offer from Dinamo Zagreb which his family accepted.

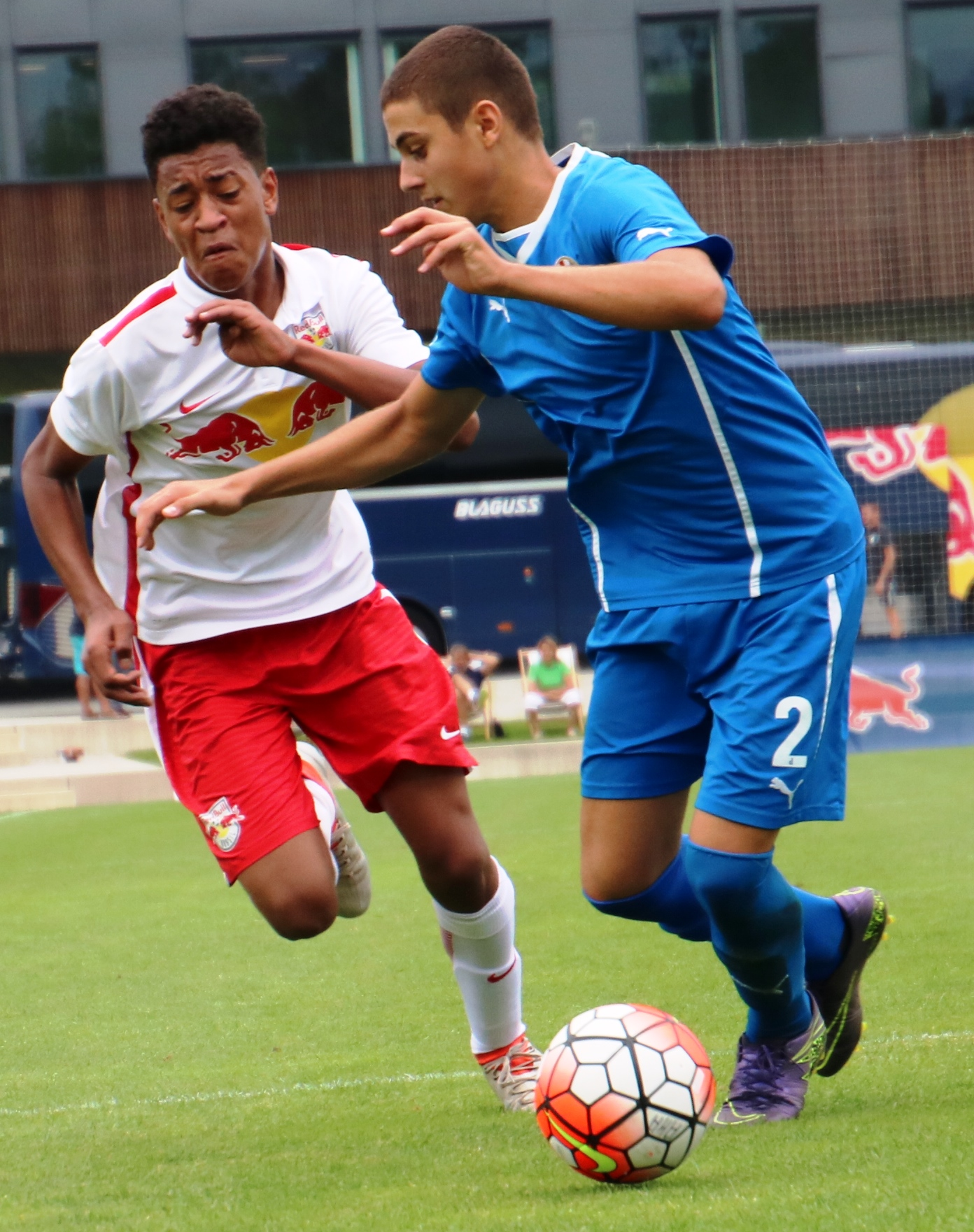
Gvardiol (right) playing for Dinamo academy in 2017

Initially, he played as a left-back or a central midfielder until Dinamo academy coach Dalibor Poldrugač moved him to the centre-back position. Soon after, Gvardiol started drawing interest from prominent European clubs, including Manchester City, Lille, Borussia Dortmund, RB Leipzig, Bayern Munich, Ajax, Inter Milan and Roma. He played a key part in Dinamo's 2018–19 UEFA Youth League campaign, where they reached quarter-finals before losing 4–2 to Chelsea in a penalty shootout. After being impressed by his performances for youth teams, senior Dinamo coach Nenad Bjelica called Gvardiol up to the senior team for pre-season games in Slovenia in summer 2019. On 2 July, he scored in a 2–0 friendly win over Austria Klagenfurt. On 10 October 2019, he was included in The Guardian's Next Generation list.

=== Dinamo Zagreb ===
==== 2019–20 season ====
Gvardiol made his league debut for the senior Dinamo team on 18 October in a 4–2 victory over Gorica, coming on for Mario Gavranović in the 87th minute. In his second league appearance for the club on 2 November, he scored the only goal in a 1–0 victory over Inter Zaprešić. That made him the sixth youngest league goal scorer for Dinamo, after Alen Halilović, Mateo Kovačić, Niko Kranjčar, Ante Ćorić and Tin Jedvaj.

On 12 February 2020, in a UEFA Youth League play-off against Dynamo Kyiv, Gvardiol successfully converted a penalty in a shootout as Dinamo won 4–3 and qualified for the round of 16. In the round of 16 against Bayern Munich on 4 March, Gvardiol deflected Leon Dajaku's shot into his own net to set the score to 2–2. In the resulting shootout, he successfully converted his attempt again as Dinamo won 6–5 and progressed to the quarter-finals. On 25 June, Gvardiol signed a five-year contract with Dinamo. On 5 July, in the derby against Rijeka when the league title was already secured, Gvardiol deflected Franko Andrijašević's shot into his own net as Rijeka won 2–0, which would eventually cost coach Igor Jovićević his job.

==== 2020–21 season ====
On 26 August, in the Champions League qualifier against CFR Cluj, Gvardiol came on as a substitute for Mario Gavranović in the 54th minute following Kévin Théophile-Catherine's red card. The game led to a penalty shootout, with Gvardiol successfully converting his attempt, as Dinamo won 6–5 and progressed to the third qualifying round. In late August and early September, the media reported on the interest of the newly promoted Premier League side Leeds United, whose manager Marcelo Bielsa offered €22 million to sign the 18-year-old Croat. However, Gvardiol refused the offer and opted to stay in the Prva HNL and develop further. On 16 September, in a Champions League qualifier against Ferencváros, Gvardiol made an error that led to Myrto Uzuni's winning goal for 2–1 as the Hungarian champions knocked Dinamo out to the Europa League play-offs.

However, on 28 September, it was announced that Gvardiol signed for Bundesliga club RB Leipzig on a five-year contract for €16 million, plus various add-ons. The fee was the highest ever paid for a Croatian teenager and the third highest ever paid for a Croatian defender, only behind Dejan Lovren and Duje Ćaleta-Car. Gvardiol remained at Dinamo for the remainder of the season. On 22 October, he debuted for Dinamo in a senior UEFA competition in a goalless draw against Feyenoord in the Europa League. On 16 November, Gvardiol tested positive for COVID-19, which forced him to miss the derby against Osijek, now managed by Bjelica, on 21 November. On 10 December, Gvardiol scored his first goal in a senior UEFA competition, as Dinamo defeated CSKA Moscow 3–1 in the Europa League. After completion of the Europa League group stage, Gvardiol's performances were highly praised, as Dinamo conceded only one goal and topped their group.

On 28 February 2021, Gvardiol scored the opening goal and assisted the third one in a 3–0 victory against Slaven Belupo. However, after a quadriceps injury in training in early March, he was forced to miss both legs of Dinamo's Europa League Round of 16 tie against Tottenham Hotspur, which Dinamo won 3–2 on aggregate. He returned for the quarter-final match against Villarreal on 8 April, which ended as a 1–0 loss. Three days later, he scored his third goal of the season in a 2–0 victory over Lokomotiva. On 22 May, Gvardiol played his last game for Dinamo, 1–0 victory against Šibenik.

=== RB Leipzig ===
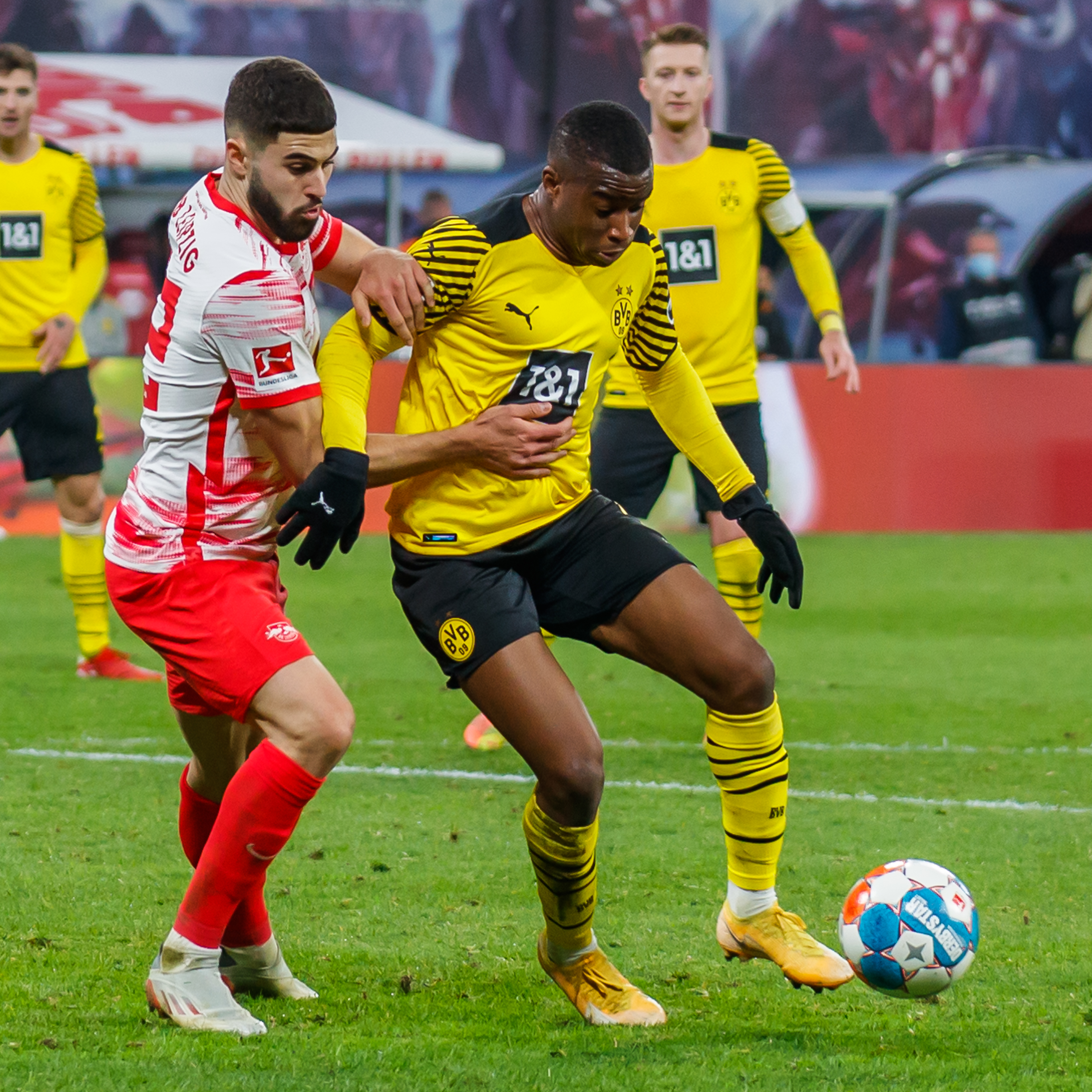
Gvardiol (left) defending Borussia Dortmund's Youssoufa Moukoko with RB Leipzig in 2021

After returning to Leipzig at the start of the 2021–22 season, Gvardiol made his Bundesliga debut on 20 August 2021 in a 4–0 victory over VfB Stuttgart, playing the entire match. He quickly established himself in Leipzig's starting lineup and attracted attention with his impressive performances.

On 15 September 2021, he made his Champions League debut in a 6–3 defeat to Manchester City. On 11 December, he scored his debut goal for Leipzig in a 4–1 victory over Borussia Mönchengladbach. He significantly contributed to Leipzig's good form during the beginning of Domenico Tedesco's tenure as manager, after the poor start of the season during previous manager Jesse Marsch's term.

On 23 January 2022, he scored his second goal of the season in a 2–0 victory over VfL Wolfsburg. By the end of the season, Gvardiol helped Leipzig win the DFB-Pokal and reach the semi-finals of the Europa League, accomplishing both feats for the first time in the history of the club. Furthermore, the DFB-Pokal victory was also the first major trophy title in the history of the club.

On 12 August, France Football announced Gvardiol as one of the nominees for the 2022 Kopa Trophy, where he eventually finished in sixth place. On 1 September, Gvardiol extended his contract with RB Leipzig until 2027, with the club having rejected Chelsea's €90 million offer for the player. On 25 October, Gvardiol scored his first ever Champions League goal in a 3–2 victory over Real Madrid. The game was Madrid's first defeat of the season. On 22 February 2023, Gvardiol scored an equaliser in a 1–1 draw with Manchester City in the Champions League round of 16. Aged 21 years and 30 days, he became the youngest Croatian player ever to score in a Champions League knockout phase.

=== Manchester City ===
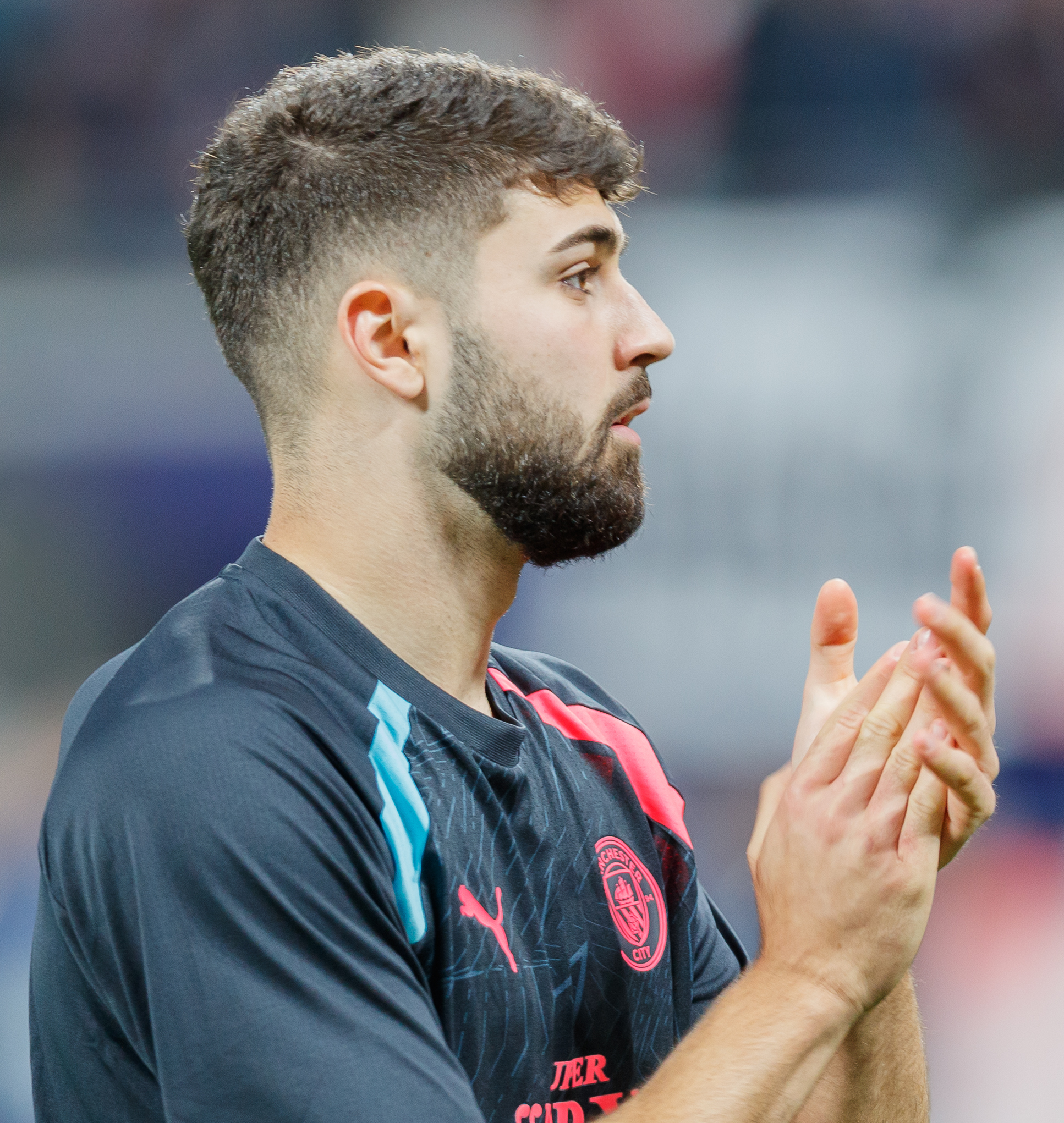
Gvardiol with Manchester City in 2023

On 5 August 2023, English Premier League club Manchester City announced the signing of Gvardiol on a five-year deal, making him the third Croatian to join the club's first team after Vedran Ćorluka and Mateo Kovačić. The fee was undisclosed, but reported to be around £77 million (€90 million), making Gvardiol the most expensive defender in the world.

Gvardiol made his Premier League debut for Manchester City on 11 August in a 3–0 victory over Burnley, coming on for Rico Lewis in the 79th minute. He was given his first Manchester City start in the 2023 UEFA Super Cup against Sevilla, playing the full 90 minutes, with his team winning 5–4 in a penalty shoot-out after a 1–1 draw in regulation time. Three days later, he started his first Premier League game in a 1–0 home win against Newcastle United. On 6 September, Gvardiol was announced as one of the nominees for the 2023 Ballon d'Or. He scored his first Manchester City goal on 9 April 2024, in the first leg of the Champions League quarter-final against Real Madrid, which ended in a 3–3 draw at the Santiago Bernabéu. Four days later, he recorded his first goal and assist in the Premier League in a 5–1 victory over Luton Town. On 11 May, Gvardiol scored the first brace of his career to help City overtake Arsenal in the Premier League title race with a 4–0 away win at Fulham. Eight days later, Gvardiol played the entire match against West Ham United, which Manchester City won 3–1, securing the league title. The triumph made Gvardiol and his teammate Kovačić the second and third ever Croatians to win the Premier League, after Dejan Lovren in 2020.

On 28 September 2024, Gvardiol scored his first Premier League goal of the 2024–25 season in a 1–1 draw against Newcastle United. On 27 April 2025, he scored his first FA Cup goal, a header following an Omar Marmoush corner, sealing City's 2–0 victory against Nottingham Forest and helping his team reach their third successive final in the competition. On 12 June 2025, Gvardiol was named the Manchester City Player of the Season. On 4 January 2026, he suffered a broken shinbone in a 1–1 draw with Chelsea, which required surgery and sidelined him for several months.

His first match after injury was on 13 May, much sooner than most experts believed he would come back. On 28 July, Gvardiol signed a new five-year contract, keeping him at the club until 2031. On 23 August, Gvardiol scored a stoppage-time winner from a Rayan Cherki pass in a 2–1 home win over Bournemouth on the opening weekend of the 2026–27 season; he was initially flagged offside before the goal was confirmed by VAR.

== International career ==
Gvardiol earned his first call-up to Croatia national under-21 team in October 2019, at the age of 17, when coach Igor Bišćan listed him in the squad for Under-21 Euro 2021 qualifiers against Lithuania and the Czech Republic. Gvardiol debuted on 14 November against the former opponent, being named in the starting line-up, as Croatia won 3–1. On 8 October 2020, he scored the tenth goal in Croatia's 10–0 victory over San Marino, the largest victory in the history of the national team. On 9 March 2021, he was named in Bišćan's 23-man squad for the group stage of the tournament; however, he was forced to miss it due to a quadriceps injury. On 17 May, he was named in Bišćan's 23-man squad for the knockout stage of the tournament, as well as Zlatko Dalić's 26-man senior squad for UEFA Euro 2020.

After losing 2–1 to Spain after extra time in the Under-21 Euro quarter-final, Gvardiol joined the senior Croatia team. He made his senior debut in a friendly 1–0 defeat to Belgium on 6 June, coming on as a substitute to Borna Barišić at half-time. One week later, he earned his first start for the national team, in a 1–0 defeat against England in Croatia's opening game of Euro 2020. At the age of 19 years, 4 months and 21 days, he became the youngest ever player to play for Croatia at a major tournament, surpassing Mateo Kovačić. He went on to start all Croatia's games at the tournament. On 8 October 2021, he scored his debut goal for Croatia in a 3–0 World Cup qualifying victory against Cyprus.

On 9 November 2022, Gvardiol was named in Dalić's 26-man squad for the 2022 FIFA World Cup. A day later, in a Bundesliga match with Leipzig against Freiburg, Gvardiol broke his nose after colliding with Willi Orbán and prominently wore a face mask during the tournament as a consequence. He received extended praise for his defensive performance in the group stage, especially in the decisive match against Belgium on 1 December that ended up as a goalless draw and saw Croatia qualify for the knockout stage for the third time in history. On 17 December, in the third place play-off against Morocco, Gvardiol scored his first goal for Croatia at a major tournament. At the age of 20 years, 10 months and 24 days, he became the youngest ever player to score for Croatia at a major tournament, surpassing Ivica Olić. He was named Man of the Match, as Croatia won 2–1 and claimed their second bronze and third overall World Cup medal in history. Despite being a favourite for the FIFA Young Player Award, he lost it to Argentina's Enzo Fernández.

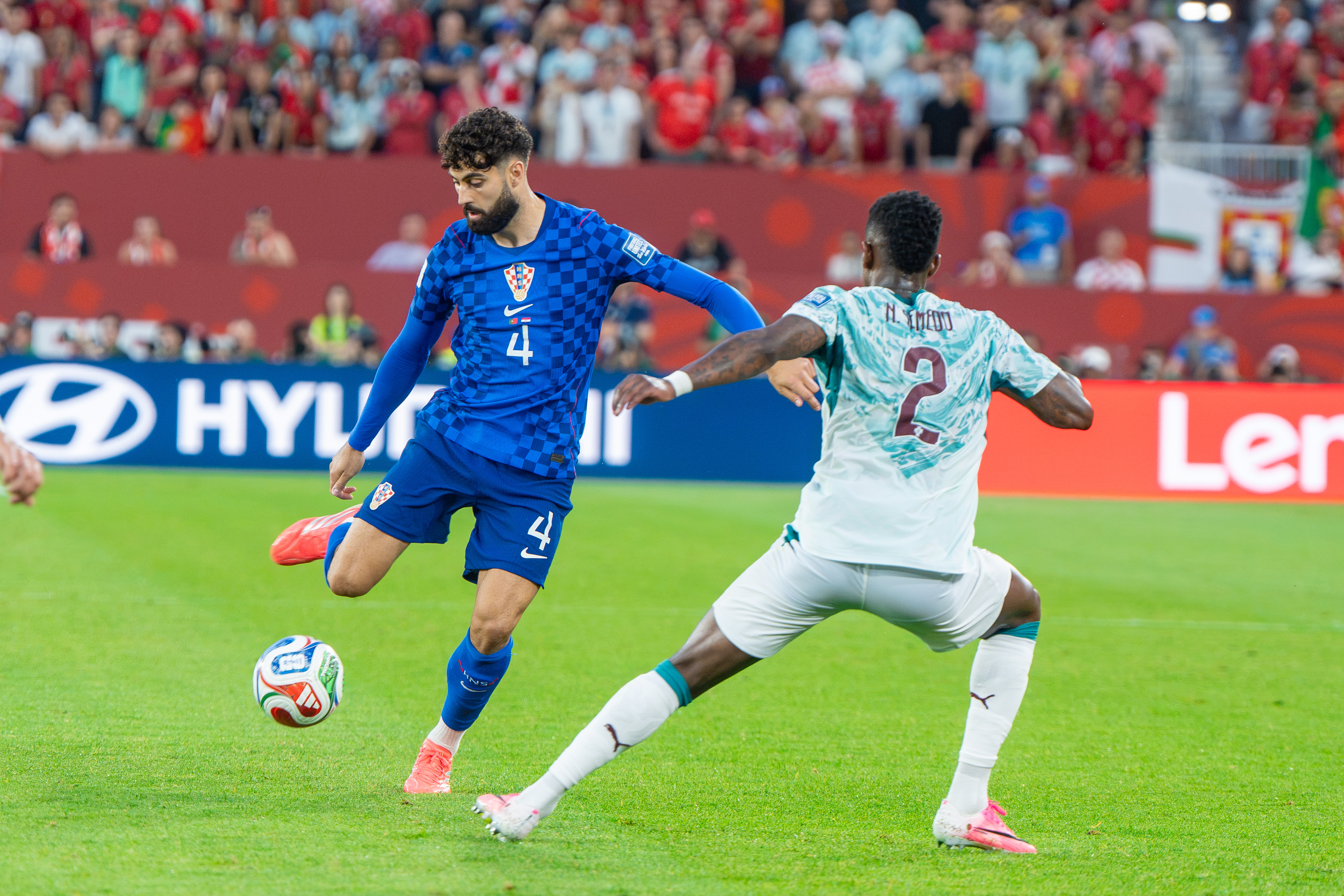
Gvardiol (in blue) with Croatia at the 2026 FIFA World Cup

On 5 June 2023, Gvardiol was named in Dalić's 23-man squad for the 2023 UEFA Nations League Finals; however, on 10 June, he was ruled out due to an abdominal wall injury and replaced by Dion Drena Beljo. On 7 June 2024, Gvardiol was named in Dalić's final 26-man squad for the UEFA Euro 2024. Gvardiol played all three group stage games in their entirety, as Croatia failed to progress to the knockout stage.

On 18 November 2024, in a 1–1 group stage draw with Portugal, Gvardiol scored the equaliser and secured Croatia a spot in the 2024–25 UEFA Nations League quarter-finals.

On 1 June 2026, Gvardiol was named in Dalić's final 26-man squad for the 2026 FIFA World Cup. They were knocked out by Portugal in a 2–1 defeat where an equalizing 103rd-minute stoppage-time goal from Gvardiol was disallowed as offside by VAR.

== Style of play ==
Gvardiol has been described as a modern-day centre-back who can perform all the necessary defensive tasks of a traditional defender while also providing his team with serious ball progression when in possession. Gvardiol is a left-footed centre-back who is comfortable on the ball and has the ability to break up play with robust tackles. He is also constantly looking to play forward and break opposition lines with his passing. He is most commonly used as a ball-playing defender like former Manchester City teammate John Stones or a wide centre-back like Manchester City teammate Rúben Dias. His ability on the ball, pace, and intelligence of movement on and off the ball helps him perform both roles seamlessly. He can also be used as a wing-back, primarily on the side of his strong foot, the left. In his time at RB Leipzig, he was used as a left-back in a back four or the left-most player in a back two or three.

Gvardiol has been described as a 'technically skilled defender', and as a good dribbler under pressure. He can carry the ball forward when space presents itself to pass to a teammate farther up the field while also being able to move past other defenders to create and finish chances for himself and for his teammates.

Gvardiol has been noted by analysts for a mature play style relative to his age. As a left-footed defender, he provides tactical flexibility, frequently pairing alongside a right-footed center back to improve ball distribution. He is defensively attributed with strong positional awareness, acceleration, physical presence, allowing him to anticipate attack threats, recover balls played into space in the backline, and defend against fast or physical wingers. His defensive capabilities have led to his nickname, the "Croatian wall."

== Career statistics ==
=== Club ===
As of match played 20 September 2026

Appearances and goals by club, season and competition
| Club | Season | League | | | National cup (Note: Includes Croatian Cup, DFB-Pokal and FA Cup) | | League cup (Note: Includes EFL Cup) | | Europe | | Other | | Total | |
| Club | Season | Division | Apps | Goals | Apps | Goals | Apps | Goals | Apps | Goals | Apps | Goals | Apps | Goals |
|---|---|---|---|---|---|---|---|---|---|---|---|---|---|---|
| Dinamo Zagreb II | 2019–20 | Druga HNL | 3 | 0 | — | | — | | — | | — | | 3 | 0 |
| Dinamo Zagreb II | 2020–21 | Druga HNL | 1 | 0 | — | | — | | — | | — | | 1 | 0 |
| Dinamo Zagreb II | Total | | 4 | 0 | — | | — | | — | | — | | 4 | 0 |
| Dinamo Zagreb | 2019–20 | Prva HNL | 11 | 1 | 1 | 0 | — | | 0 | 0 | 0 | 0 | 12 | 1 |
| Dinamo Zagreb | 2020–21 | Prva HNL | 25 | 2 | 2 | 0 | — | | 13 (Note: Two appearances in UEFA Champions League, eleven appearances and one goal in UEFA Europa League) | 1 | — | | 40 | 3 |
| Dinamo Zagreb | Total | | 36 | 3 | 3 | 0 | — | | 13 | 1 | 0 | 0 | 52 | 4 |
| RB Leipzig | 2021–22 | Bundesliga | 29 | 2 | 5 | 0 | — | | 12 (Note: Six appearances in UEFA Champions League, six appearances in UEFA Europa League) | 0 | — | | 46 | 2 |
| RB Leipzig | 2022–23 | Bundesliga | 30 | 1 | 5 | 0 | — | | 6 (Note: Appearances in UEFA Champions League) | 2 | 1 (Note: Appearance in DFL-Supercup) | 0 | 42 | 3 |
| RB Leipzig | Total | | 59 | 3 | 10 | 0 | — | | 18 | 2 | 1 | 0 | 88 | 5 |
| Manchester City | 2023–24 | Premier League | 28 | 4 | 4 | 0 | 1 | 0 | 6 | 1 | 3 (Note: One appearance in UEFA Super Cup, two appearances in FIFA Club World Cup) | 0 | 42 | 5 |
| Manchester City | 2024–25 | Premier League | 37 | 5 | 3 | 1 | 2 | 0 | 10 | 0 | 3 (Note: One appearance in FA Community Shield, two appearances in FIFA Club World Cup) | 0 | 55 | 6 |
| Manchester City | 2025–26 | Premier League | 18 | 2 | 0 | 0 | 2 | 0 | 5 | 0 | — | | 25 | 2 |
| Manchester City | 2026–27 | Premier League | 5 | 1 | 0 | 0 | 0 | 0 | 1 | 0 | 1 (Note: Appearance in FA Community Shield) | 0 | 7 | 1 |
| Manchester City | Total | | 88 | 12 | 7 | 1 | 5 | 0 | 22 | 1 | 7 | 0 | 129 | 14 |
| Career total | | | 187 | 18 | 20 | 1 | 5 | 0 | 53 | 4 | 8 | 0 | 273 | 23 |

=== International ===
As of match played 15 November 2026

Appearances and goals by national team and year
| National team | Year | Apps | Goals |
|---|---|---|---|
| Croatia | 2021 | 9 | 1 |
| Croatia | 2022 | 10 | 1 |
| Croatia | 2023 | 8 | 0 |
| Croatia | 2024 | 12 | 1 |
| Croatia | 2025 | 7 | 1 |
| Croatia | 2026 | 12 | 0 |
| Total | | 58 | 4 |

As of match played 14 November 2025
Croatia score listed first, score column indicates score after each Gvardiol goal

List of international goals scored by Joško Gvardiol
| No. | Date | Venue | Opponent | Score | Result | Competition |
|---|---|---|---|---|---|---|
| 1 | 8 October 2021 | AEK Arena – Georgios Karapatakis, Larnaca, Cyprus | Cyprus | 2–0 | 3–0 | 2022 FIFA World Cup qualification |
| 2 | 17 December 2022 | Khalifa International Stadium, Al Rayyan, Qatar | Morocco | 1–0 | 2–1 | 2022 FIFA World Cup |
| 3 | 18 November 2024 | Stadion Poljud, Split, Croatia | Portugal | 1–1 | 1–1 | 2024–25 UEFA Nations League A |
| 4 | 14 November 2025 | Stadion Rujevica, Rijeka, Croatia | Faroe Islands | 1–1 | 3–1 | 2026 FIFA World Cup qualification |

== Honours ==
=== Club ===
Dinamo Zagreb

- Prva HNL: 2019–20, 2020–21
- Croatian Cup: 2020–21
- Croatian Super Cup: 2019

RB Leipzig

- DFB-Pokal: 2021–22, 2022–23

Manchester City

- Premier League: 2023–24
- FA Cup: 2025–26; runner-up: 2024–25
- EFL Cup: 2025–26
- FA Community Shield: 2024
- UEFA Super Cup: 2023
- FIFA Club World Cup: 2023

=== International ===
Croatia

- FIFA World Cup third place: 2022

=== Individual ===
- Trophy Footballer – Best Prva HNL U-21 player: 2021
- Trophy Footballer – Team of the Year: 2021
- IFFHS Men's World Team: 2022
- IFFHS Men's World Youth (U20) Team: 2022
- VDV Bundesliga Team of the Season: 2022–23
- Manchester City Player of the Season: 2024–25
