= Dariusz Wosz =

German footballer (born 1969)

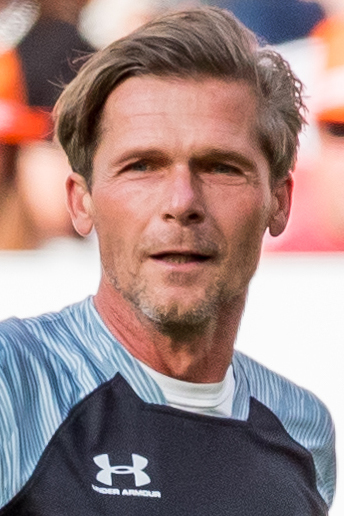
- Wosz in 2019

Personal information
- Date of birth: 8 June 1969 (age 57)
- Place of birth: Piekary Śląskie, Katowice Voivodeship, Poland
- Height: 1.83 m (6 ft 0 in)
- Position: Midfielder

Team information
- Current team: VfL Bochum (technical trainer)

Youth career
- 1980–1981: BSG Motor Halle
- 1981–1984: BSG Empor Halle
- 1984–1986: Chemie Halle

Senior career*
Years	Team	Apps	(Gls)
1986–1992	Hallescher FC (Note: Hallescher FC were known as Chemie Halle until 1991.)	116	(20)
1992–1998	VfL Bochum	211	(25)
1998–2001	Hertha BSC	85	(11)
2001–2007	VfL Bochum	135	(16)
2007–2009	SC Union Bergen	15	(12)
Total		563	(74)

International career
1989–1990	East Germany	7	(0)
1997–2000	Germany	17	(1)

Managerial career
- 2007–2013: VfL Bochum U-19
- 2009–2010: VfL Bochum (assistant)
- 2010: VfL Bochum (caretaker)
- 2010–2013: VfL Bochum (assistant)
- 2013–2014: VfL Bochum II
- 2014–2015: VfL Bochum U-19
- 2015–: VfL Bochum (technical trainer)
Medal record
Chemie Halle
Winner	DDR-Liga	1986–87
VfL Bochum
Winner	2. Bundesliga	1993–94
Winner	2. Bundesliga	1995–96
Winner	2. Bundesliga	2005–06
Hertha BSC
Runner-up	DFB-Ligapokal	2000
- * Club domestic league appearances and goals

Dariusz Wosz (German pronunciation: [ˈdaːʁi̯ʊs ˈvɔʃ], Polish: [ˈdarjuʐ ˈvɔʂ]; born 8 June 1969) is a German professional football coach and former player who is a technical trainer for German club VfL Bochum. As a player, he played mostly as a deep-lying playmaker in midfield.

== Early life ==
Wosz's family migrated to Halle, Germany, from the Polish part of Silesia.

== Club career ==
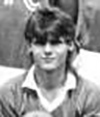
Wosz during his early career with Hallescher FC in 1988

Wosz started playing football at BSG Motor Halle in 1980. After a year there he moved to BSG Empor Halle before joining Chemie Halle in 1984.

Two years after joining the club he made it into the first team, who earned promotion from the second division to the DDR-Oberliga, although Wosz would only play once, in 1986–87. During the following four seasons he would amass 93 games (15 goals) until the Oberliga merged with the Bundesliga due to the German reunification.

Wosz stayed at Halle for the 1991–92 2. Bundesliga season, lining up in 22 games (five goals). Because the club finished fourth in the final East German football season, he was able to play twice in the 1991–92 UEFA Cup.

Wosz was transferred to VfL Bochum in toward the end of the 1991–92 season. As captain, he led Bochum to its biggest success yet: the third round of the 1997–98 UEFA Cup which was lost 6–4 on aggregate to Ajax.

In the summer of 1998, Wosz was transferred to Hertha BSC. After three successful years, including participation in the UEFA Champions League where he scored the winning goal against A.C. Milan, he requested to be transferred back to Bochum, where he helped the side qualify for the 2004–05 UEFA Cup. During his final season, 2006–07, Wosz only played one match, being substituted on for Zvjezdan Misimović in the 70th minute against Borussia Mönchengladbach. Twelve minutes later he scored his final Bundesliga goal. In summer 2007, he played besides his coaching job with Bochum-based football club SC Union Bergen and retired in summer 2009.

== International career ==
Wosz earned his first international cap for East Germany when he played against Finland on 22 March 1989 in Dresden. The match ended as a 1–1 draw. His seventh cap, his final game for East Germany, was against Belgium on 12 September 1990 in Brussels. East Germany won the match 2–1.

On 26 February 1997, he debuted for the reunified Germany against Israel in Tel Aviv. Germany won the match 1–0, with Wosz scoring Germany's goal. Wosz was part of the German squad for Euro 2000 but Erich Ribbeck did not use him during the tournament. He made his final national appearance against Denmark on 15 November 2000 in Copenhagen. Germany lost 2–1. Wosz was the final active international player to have had caps for East Germany national team.

== Coaching career ==
After retiring, Wosz served as Bochum's U-19 coach and was on 20 September 2009 named as assistant coach of the Bundesliga team. On 29 April 2010, he replaced Heiko Herrlich as head coach of VfL Bochum.

In the summer 2015, Wosz was appointed as the new technical trainer in the club, both for the seniors and the youth teams.

== Background ==
- Wosz is the only player of VfL Bochum who got a "Farewell-match". On 8 September 2007, a team formed by the UEFA Cup squad of Bochum played against a team of old teammates of Wosz. The match ended 12–8 and two goals of Wosz who played for both sides.
- By many supporters of VfL Bochum he is only called "him" (in German: er), after his return to the club.

== Personal life ==
Wosz's nephew, Joscha Wosz, is also a professional footballer.

== Career statistics ==
=== Club ===
Appearances and goals by club, season and competition
Club	Season	League			National Cup		League Cup		Europe		Total	
Club	Season	Division	Apps	Goals	Apps	Goals	Apps	Goals	Apps	Goals	Apps	Goals
Chemie Halle	1986–87	DDR-Liga	1	0	0	0	—		—		1	0
Chemie Halle	1987–88	DDR-Oberliga	22	2	4	0	—		—		26	2
Chemie Halle	1988–89	DDR-Oberliga	21	5	1	0	—		—		22	5
Chemie Halle	1989–90	DDR-Oberliga	24	5	2	0	—		—		26	5
Chemie Halle	1990–91	NOFV-Oberliga	26	3	2	0	—		—		28	3
Hallescher FC	1991–92	2. Bundesliga	22	5	1	0	—		2	0	25	5
Hallescher FC	Total		116	20	10	0	0	0	2	0	128	20
VfL Bochum	1991–92	Bundesliga	16	0	0	0	—		—		16	0
VfL Bochum	1992–93	Bundesliga	33	3	2	0	—		—		35	3
VfL Bochum	1993–94	2. Bundesliga	34	3	1	0	—		—		35	3
VfL Bochum	1994–95	Bundesliga	32	2	2	0	—		—		34	2
VfL Bochum	1995–96	Bundesliga	31	3	1	0	—		—		32	3
VfL Bochum	1996–97	Bundesliga	32	9	4	0	—		—		36	9
VfL Bochum	1997–98	Bundesliga	33	5	2	1	1	0	6	1	42	7
VfL Bochum	Total		211	25	12	1	1	0	6	1	230	27
Hertha BSC	1998–99	Bundesliga	31	3	3	0	—		—		34	3
Hertha BSC	1999–00	Bundesliga	32	5	1	0	1	0	12	2	46	7
Hertha BSC	2000–01	Bundesliga	22	3	1	1	3	0	3	0	29	4
Hertha BSC	Total		85	11	5	1	4	0	15	2	109	14
VfL Bochum	2001–02	2. Bundesliga	27	6	1	0	—		—		28	6
VfL Bochum	2002–03	Bundesliga	30	2	4	1	—		—		34	3
VfL Bochum	2003–04	Bundesliga	33	4	0	0	1	0	—		34	4
VfL Bochum	2004–05	Bundesliga	29	2	1	0	1	0	2	0	33	2
VfL Bochum	2005–06	2. Bundesliga	15	1	1	1	—		—		16	2
VfL Bochum	2006–07	Bundesliga	1	1	0	0	—		—		1	1
VfL Bochum	Total		135	16	7	2	2	0	2	0	146	18
Career total			547	72	34	4	7	0	25	3	613	79

=== International ===
Appearances and goals by national team and year
National team	Year	Apps	Goals
East Germany	1989	3	0
East Germany	1990	4	0
Total		7	0
Germany	1997	6	1
Germany	1998	1	0
Germany	1999	4	0
Germany	2000	6	0
Total		17	1

Scores and results list Germany's goal tally first, score column indicates score after each Wosz goal.

List of international goals scored by Dariusz Wosz
No.	Date	Venue	Opponent	Score	Result	Competition
1	26 February 1997	Ramat Gan Stadium, Ramat Gan, Israel	Israel	1–0	1–0	Friendly
