= Christopher Nkunku =

French footballer (born 1997)

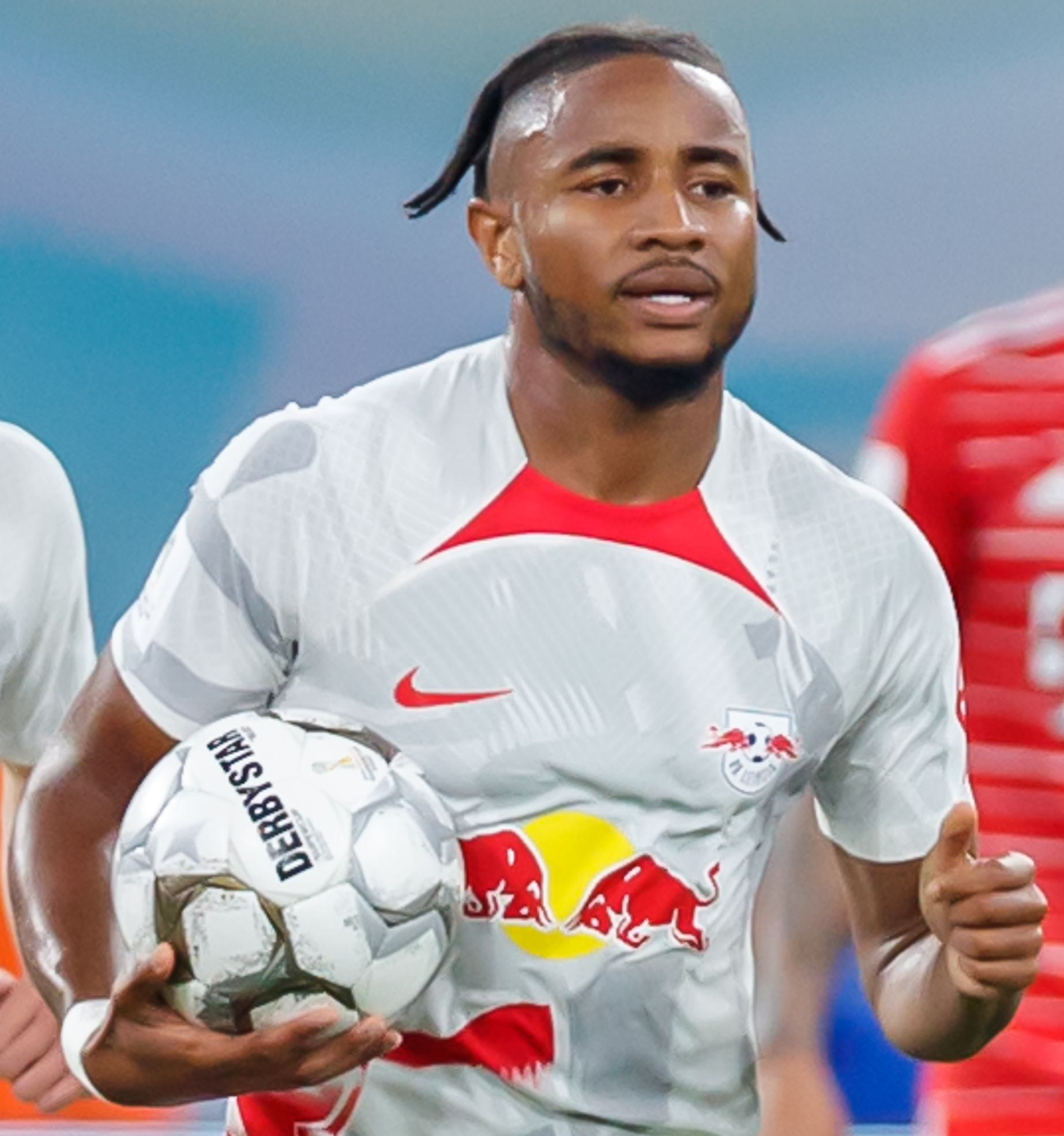
- Nkunku playing for RB Leipzig in 2022

Personal information
- Full name: Christopher Alan Nkunku
- Date of birth: 14 November 1997 (age 28)
- Place of birth: Lagny-sur-Marne, France
- Height: 1.77 m (5 ft 10 in)
- Positions: Forward; attacking midfielder; winger

Team information
- Current team: RB Leipzig (on loan from AC Milan)
- Number: 28

Youth career
- 2003–2009: AS Marolles
- 2009–2010: Fontainebleau
- 2010–2015: Paris Saint-Germain

Senior career*
Years	Team	Apps	(Gls)
2015–2016	Paris Saint-Germain B	27	(5)
2015–2019	Paris Saint-Germain	55	(8)
2019–2023	RB Leipzig	119	(47)
2023–2025	Chelsea	38	(6)
2025–	AC Milan	32	(7)
2026–	→ RB Leipzig (loan)	6	(5)

International career^{‡}
2012	France U16	3	(0)
2016	France U19	3	(0)
2016–2017	France U20	12	(0)
2018	France U21	6	(0)
2022–	France	18	(2)
- * Club domestic league appearances and goals as of 20:26, 17 October 2026 (UTC) ‡ National team caps and goals as of 21:17, 16 November 2025 (UTC)

Christopher Alan Nkunku (born 14 November 1997) is a French professional footballer who plays as a forward, attacking midfielder or winger for Bundesliga club RB Leipzig, on loan from Serie A club AC Milan, and the France national team.

Nkunku is a graduate of the Paris Saint-Germain Academy and made his professional debut for the club in December 2015. He made 78 appearances for them and won the Ligue 1 title thrice, the Coupe de France twice, and the Coupe de la Ligue twice. He moved to the German side RB Leipzig in July 2019, with whom he scored 70 goals in 172 appearances over four seasons and won the DFB-Pokal twice. He was named the Bundesliga Player of the Season in the 2021–22 campaign and was the league's top scorer the following season. Nkunku was signed by Chelsea in 2023 for £52 million. After spending two years in Chelsea, he joined AC Milan in 2025.

Nkunku represented France at multiple youth international levels, before making his debut for the senior national team in March 2022. He was included in the squad for the 2022 FIFA World Cup that November, but withdrew injured.

== Early life ==
Christopher Alan Nkunku was born on 14 November 1997 in Lagny-sur-Marne, Seine-et-Marne. He went to El Francis Assis Secondary school and he began playing football with AS Marolles as a six-year-old. In 2009, he joined Fontainebleau, where he was spotted by scouts of several professional clubs. Despite his young age and childlike physique, he was noted for "his speed, his technique and his vision of the game", as recalled by Norbert Boj in 2020, former head of the Fontainebleau football school. He would line up in all positions across the midfield, a versatility he, according to another coach at the club, owed to his "technical prowess, obviously, but especially his intelligence of play".

Due to being considered too young and light, Nkunku was not signed by Lens, Le Havre, and Monaco, clubs where he had been on trials. He eventually signed with Paris Saint-Germain, where he was able to progress through the youth sides of INF Clairefontaine at under-15 level. Spending the weekdays at Clairefontaine and playing only on weekends with Paris Saint-Germain, he made the permanent move to the French club at the age of fifteen.

== Club career ==
=== Paris Saint-Germain ===
Nkunku joined the Paris Saint-Germain youth system in 2010. He was a member of the youth team who were runners-up in the 2015–16 UEFA Youth League. He made his professional debut at the age of 18 on 8 December 2015, in a UEFA Champions League match against Shakhtar Donetsk, replacing Lucas Moura after 87 minutes in a 2–0 home win. He scored his first professional goal in a 7–0 home win against Bastia in the Coupe de France on 7 January 2017. On 10 March 2018, he scored his first brace as a professional, in a 5–0 win against Metz.

=== RB Leipzig ===
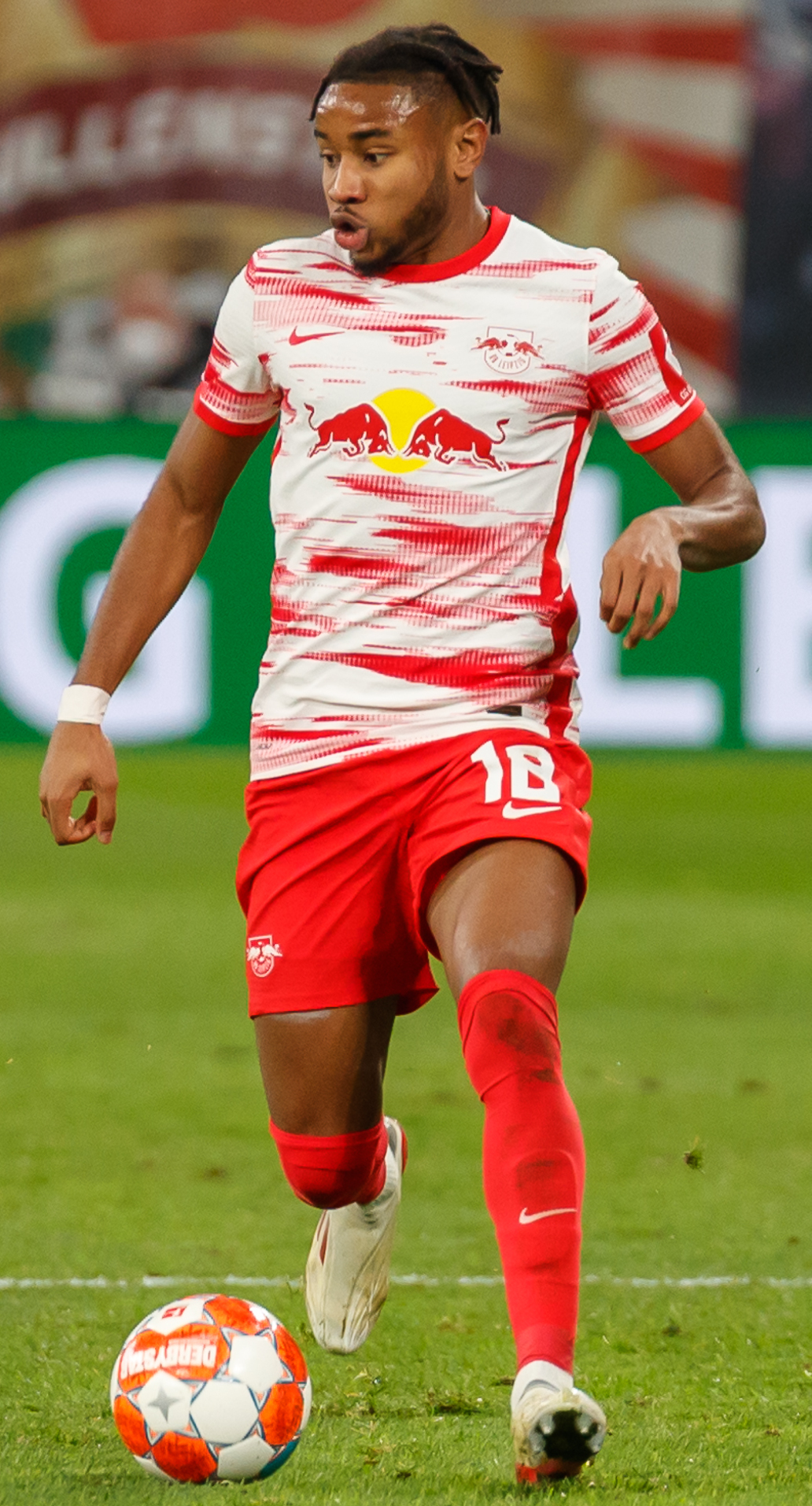
Nkunku playing for RB Leipzig in 2021

On 18 July 2019, German side RB Leipzig announced the signing of Nkunku on a five-year deal for an approximate €13 million transfer fee plus bonuses. He made his debut for the club on 11 August in a DFB-Pokal match against VfL Osnabrück, which ended in a 3–2 victory. His Bundesliga debut followed a week later, scoring his first competitive goal on the first matchday of the 2019–20 season in a 4–0 win over regional rivals Union Berlin.

On 22 February 2020, Nkunku provided four assists in a 5–0 victory over Schalke 04. In doing so, he became just the second player in recent Bundesliga history to register four assists in a single match, after Szabolcs Huszti in 2012.

On 15 September 2021, Nkunku scored a hat-trick for Leipzig in their 6–3 defeat to Manchester City in a 2021–22 UEFA Champions League group stage match. He was the first player in the club's history to score a hat-trick in the UEFA Champions League. In May 2022, he won the 2021–22 Bundesliga Player of the Season award after scoring 20 times and assisting 13 goals in 34 league games. In the 2022–23 season, he scored 16 goals in the league to finish as joint top scorer along with Niclas Füllkrug.

=== Chelsea ===
On 20 June 2023, Nkunku signed for Premier League club Chelsea on a six-year deal starting 1 July. The transfer fee was reported to be £52 million. On 8 August, it was announced that he had undergone surgery for a knee injury sustained during a pre-season match and would be out for an extended period, thereby missing the start of the season. He finally made his debut on 19 December 2023 against Newcastle United in the quarter-finals of the EFL Cup, scoring a penalty in the 4–2 shoot-out win after the match finished 1–1. Five days later, he made his Premier League debut away at Wolverhampton Wanderers, coming off the bench during the second half and scoring a late goal in a 2–1 defeat for Chelsea. On 31 January 2024, he scored again against Liverpool in a 4–1 loss at Anfield. On 24 September, Nkunku scored a hat-trick against EFL League Two side Barrow A.F.C. in the third round of the EFL Cup, helping the Blues to a 5–0 victory.

=== AC Milan ===
On 30 August 2025, Nkunku moved to Serie A, signing for AC Milan on a five-year deal worth €42 million. A month later, on 23 September, he scored his first goal in a 3–0 Coppa Italia victory over Lecce.

==== Loan to RB Leipzig ====
On 25 August 2026, Nkunku returned to RB Leipzig, signing for them on loan for the 2026–27 season with a buy option.

== International career ==
Nkunku was born in France and is of Congolese descent. He was a French youth international, representing the country at under-16, under-19, under-20, and under-21 levels. He made three appearances for the under-20 team at the 2017 FIFA U-20 World Cup.

Nkunku was called up to the senior France squad for the first time for friendly matches against Ivory Coast and South Africa on 25 and 29 March 2022, respectively. He made his debut as a starter in the game against Ivory Coast.

On 9 November 2022, Nkunku was named in the 25-man French squad for the 2022 FIFA World Cup in Qatar. On 15 November, he sustained a knee injury after colliding with Eduardo Camavinga during training at Clairefontaine, which forced him to drop out prior to the competition.

On 10 October 2024, Nkunku scored his first goal for the national team in a 4–1 away win against Israel.

== Style of play ==
Nkunku is known for his 1v1 abilities due to his dribbling skills and burst of pace which enable opportunities for him to separate from his mark with space to look for a pass or shot. He is a right-footed attacker who can play centrally or out wide. Nkunku is known for his distinctive goal celebration where he inflates a balloon in the color of his team (red during his time at RB Leipzig and AC Milan, and blue at Chelsea) which he usually carries in his sock. He has explained that the celebration is for his son, who likes balloons.

== Career statistics ==
=== Club ===
As of match played 21 October 2026

Appearances and goals by club, season and competition
Club	Season	League			National cup (Note: Includes Coupe de France, DFB-Pokal, FA Cup, Coppa Italia)		League cup (Note: Includes Coupe de la Ligue, EFL Cup)		Europe		Other		Total	
Club	Season	Division	Apps	Goals	Apps	Goals	Apps	Goals	Apps	Goals	Apps	Goals	Apps	Goals
Paris Saint-Germain B	2015–16	CFA	18	2	—		—		—		—		18	2
Paris Saint-Germain B	2016–17	CFA	9	3	—		—		—		—		9	3
Paris Saint-Germain B	Total		27	5	—		—		—		—		27	5
Paris Saint-Germain	2015–16	Ligue 1	5	0	0	0	0	0	1 (Note: Appearance(s) in UEFA Champions League)	0	0	0	6	0
Paris Saint-Germain	2016–17	Ligue 1	8	1	4	1	3	0	1	0	0	0	16	2
Paris Saint-Germain	2017–18	Ligue 1	20	4	3	1	3	0	0	0	1 (Note: Appearance in Trophée des Champions)	0	27	5
Paris Saint-Germain	2018–19	Ligue 1	22	3	5	0	1	0	0	0	1	1	29	4
Paris Saint-Germain	Total		55	8	12	2	7	0	2	0	2	1	78	11
RB Leipzig	2019–20	Bundesliga	32	5	3	0	—		9	0	—		44	5
RB Leipzig	2020–21	Bundesliga	28	6	5	0	—		7	1	—		40	7
RB Leipzig	2021–22	Bundesliga	34	20	6	4	—		12 (Note: Six appearances and seven goals in UEFA Champions League, six appearances and four goals in UEFA Europa League)	11	—		52	35
RB Leipzig	2022–23	Bundesliga	25	16	3	3	—		7	3	1 (Note: Appearance in DFL-Supercup)	1	36	23
RB Leipzig	Total		119	47	17	7	—		35	15	1	1	172	70
Chelsea	2023–24	Premier League	11	3	1	0	2	0	—		—		14	3
Chelsea	2024–25	Premier League	27	3	2	1	2	3	11 (Note: Appearances in UEFA Conference League)	7	6 (Note: Appearances in FIFA Club World Cup)	1	48	15
Chelsea	Total		38	6	3	1	4	3	11	7	6	1	62	18
AC Milan	2025–26	Serie A	32	7	2	1	—		—		1 (Note: Appearance in Supercoppa Italiana)	0	35	8
RB Leipzig (loan)	2026–27	Bundesliga	6	4	0	0	—		3	0	—		9	4
Career total			277	77	34	11	11	3	51	22	10	3	383	116

=== International ===
As of match played 16 November 2025

Appearances and goals by national team and year
National team	Year	Apps	Goals
France	2022	8	0
France	2023	2	0
France	2024	4	1
France	2025	4	1
Total		18	2

As of match played 13 October 2025
Scores and results list France's goal tally first, score column indicates score after each Nkunku goal

List of international goals scored by Christopher Nkunku
No.	Date	Venue	Cap	Opponent	Score	Result	Competition	Ref.
1	10 October 2024	Bozsik Aréna, Budapest, Hungary	11	Israel	2–1	4–1	2024–25 UEFA Nations League A	
2	13 October 2025	Laugardalsvöllur, Reykjavík, Iceland	16	Iceland	1–1	2–2	2026 FIFA World Cup qualification	

== Honours ==
Paris Saint-Germain

- Ligue 1: 2015–16, 2017–18, 2018–19
- Coupe de France: 2016–17, 2017–18; runner-up: 2018–19
- Coupe de la Ligue: 2016–17, 2017–18
- Trophée des Champions: 2017, 2018

RB Leipzig

- DFB-Pokal: 2021–22, 2022–23; runner up: 2020–21

Chelsea

- UEFA Conference League: 2024–25
- FIFA Club World Cup: 2025
- EFL Cup runner-up: 2023–24

Individual

- Footballer of the Year in Germany: 2022
- Bundesliga top goalscorer: 2022–23 (shared)
- Bundesliga Player of the Season: 2021–22
- Bundesliga Team of the Season: 2021–22
- VDV Player of the Season (Silver Boot): 2021–22
- VDV Bundesliga Team of the Season: 2021–22
- kicker Bundesliga Team of the Season: 2021–22, 2022–23
- Bundesliga Player of the Month: October 2021, February 2022, March 2022, April 2022
- UEFA Europa League Team of the Season: 2021–22
