= Joscha Wosz =

German footballer (born 2002)

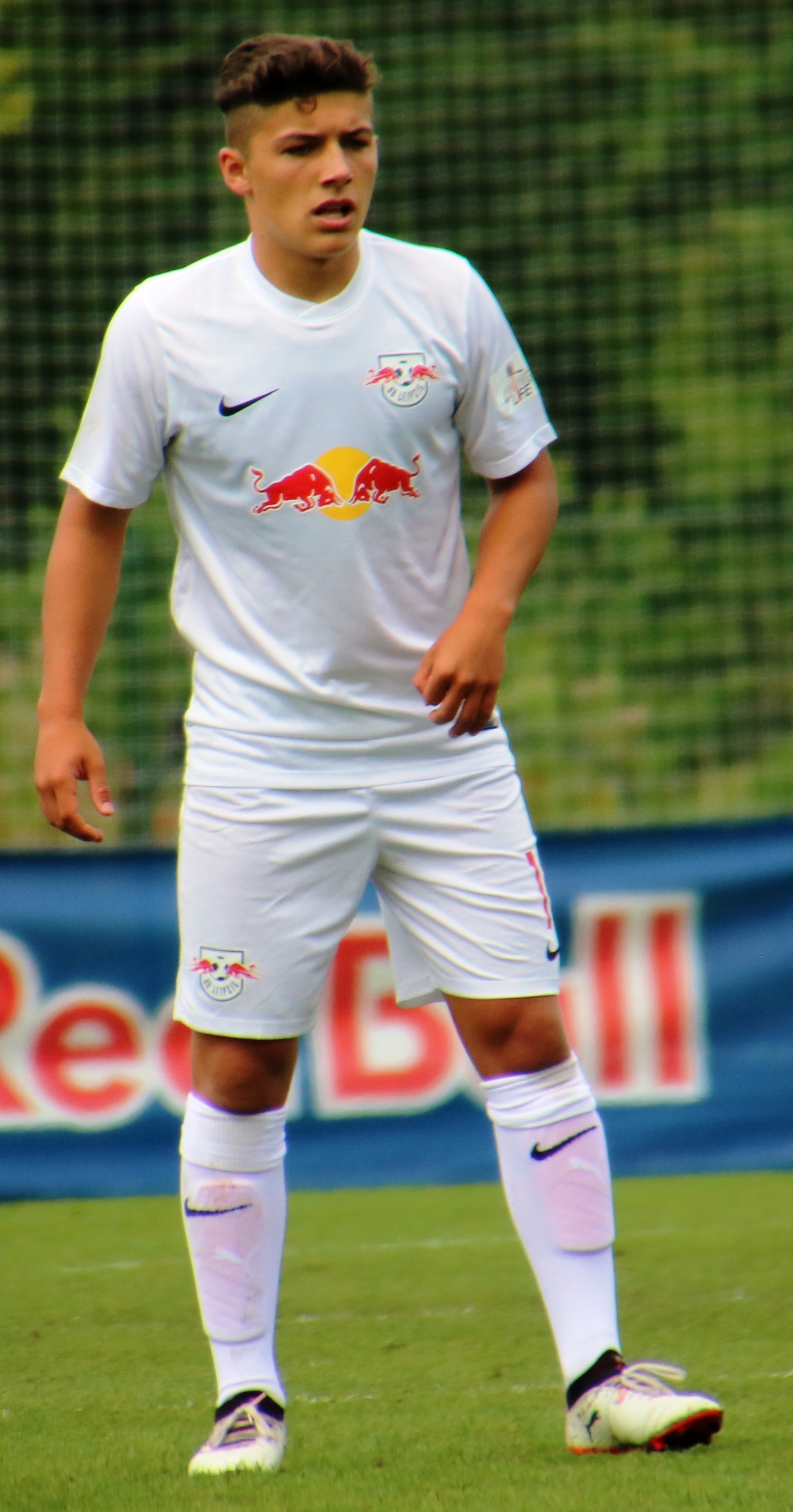
- Joscha Wosz playing for RB Leipzig in 2017.

Personal information
- Date of birth: 20 July 2002 (age 24)
- Place of birth: Halle, Germany
- Height: 1.74 m (5 ft 9 in)
- Position: Midfielder

Team information
- Current team: BFC Preussen
- Number: 20

Youth career
- –2015: Hallescher FC
- 2015–2022: RB Leipzig

Senior career*
Years	Team	Apps	(Gls)
2020–2022	RB Leipzig	3	(0)
2022	→ Hallescher FC (loan)	12	(0)
2022–2024	SC Verl	22	(2)
2022–2024	SC Verl II	4	(4)
2024–2026	Hallescher FC	49	(5)
2026–	BFC Preussen	9	(1)

International career^{‡}
2018	Germany U17	2	(0)
- * Club domestic league appearances and goals as of 23 September 2026 ‡ National team caps and goals as of 18:24, 3 October 2020 (UTC)

Joscha Wosz (born 20 July 2002) is a German professional footballer who plays as a midfielder for BFC Preussen.

== Club career ==
Wosz began his youth career at Hallescher FC, before moving to the academy of RB Leipzig in 2015. He made his professional debut for Leipzig in the Bundesliga on 3 October 2020, coming on as a substitute in the 83rd minute for Angeliño against Schalke 04, which finished as a 4–0 home win.

On 21 January 2022, Wosz returned to Hallescher FC on loan.

On 29 August 2022, Wosz signed with SC Verl on a free transfer.

On 5 June 2024, Wosz returned to Hallescher FC once again.

== International career ==
Wosz made two appearances for the Germany under-17 national team in 2018.

== Personal life ==
Wosz is the nephew of former footballer Dariusz Wosz.
