= Sebastian Hauck =

German footballer

Personal information
- Date of birth: 20 December 1988 (age 37)
- Place of birth: Leipzig, East Germany
- Position: Striker

Youth career
- SV Lindenau 1848
- VfB Leipzig
- –2007: Sachsen Leipzig

Senior career*
Years	Team	Apps	(Gls)
2007–2008	Sachsen Leipzig	0	(0)
2008–2009	SSV Markranstädt	23	(6)
2009–2010	RB Leipzig	20	(2)
2010–2012	Rot-Weiß Erfurt II	43	(17)
2010–2012	Rot-Weiß Erfurt	16	(0)
2012–2013	VfB Lübeck	17	(1)
2013–2014	Wacker Nordhausen	25	(3)
2015–2016	FC Amberg	36	(8)
2016–2018	VFC Plauen	28	(7)
2018–2020	SV 09 Arnstadt	33	(4)
Total		241	(48)
- * Club domestic league appearances and goals

Sebastian Hauck (born 20 December 1988) is a German retired footballer.
