= RB Leipzig =

Association football club in Germany

- Full name: RasenBallsport Leipzig e.V.
- Nickname: Die Roten Bullen (German for 'The Red Bulls')
- Short name: RBL
- Founded: 19 May 2009; 17 years ago
- Stadium: Red Bull Arena
- Capacity: 47,800
- Owner: Red Bull GmbH (99%) (of GmbH)
- Chairman: Johann Plenge
- Head coach: Martín Demichelis
- League: Bundesliga
- 2025–26: Bundesliga, 3rd of 18
- Website: rbleipzig.com
Home colours	Away colours	Third colours

RasenBallsport Leipzig e.V. (lit. 'Lawn Ball Sports Leipzig'), commonly known as RB Leipzig or informally as Red Bull Leipzig, or simply Leipzig, is a German professional football club based in Leipzig, Saxony. The club was founded in 2009 by the initiative of the company Red Bull GmbH, which purchased the playing rights of fifth-tier side SSV Markranstädt with the intent of advancing the new club to the top-flight Bundesliga within eight years. The men's professional football club is run by the spin-off organization RasenBallsport Leipzig GmbH. RB Leipzig plays its home matches at the Red Bull Arena. The club nickname is Die Roten Bullen (German for 'The Red Bulls').

After its foundation, RB Leipzig quickly rose through the ranks of German football, starting in the fifth-tier NOFV-Oberliga Süd. The club achieved successive promotions the following years, eventually being promoted to the Bundesliga in 2015–16. In their debut top-flight season, they qualified to the UEFA Champions League for the first time in their history, following a runner-up finish. They also became a regular feature in the Champions League, reaching the semi-finals of the competition in 2020. The club won its first domestic honour, the DFB Pokal, in back-to-back seasons, 2022 and 2023.

RB Leipzig's entrance into the upper echelons of German football has proven controversial, as the club's heavy corporate influence is regarded by many Germans to be antithetical to the traditional ownership, structure and management of sports clubs in Germany. On the other hand, some have expressed appreciation for what they view as an honourable endeavour to establish a durable footprint for the Bundesliga in the former East Germany, which previously had been at best tenuous since German reunification.

== History ==
=== 2006–2009: Negotiations with various clubs and founding ===
Before investing in Leipzig, Red Bull GmbH, led by co-owner Dietrich Mateschitz, spent three and a half years looking for a suitable location to invest in German football. Besides Leipzig, the company also considered a location in Western Germany, exploring such cities as Hamburg, Munich and Düsseldorf.

The company made its first attempt to enter the German football scene in 2006. On the advice of Franz Beckenbauer, a personal friend of Dietrich Mateschitz, the company decided to invest in Leipzig. The local football club FC Sachsen Leipzig, successor to the former East German champions BSG Chemie Leipzig, had for years been in financial difficulties. Red Bull GmbH drew up plans to invest up to 50 million euros in the club. The company planned a takeover, with a change of the team's colours and club name. Involved in the arrangements was film entrepreneur Michael Kölmel, sponsor of FC Sachsen Leipzig and owner of the Zentralstadion. By 2006, FC Sachsen Leipzig played in the Oberliga, by then the fourth tier in the German football league system. Playing in the fourth tier, the club had to undergo the German Football Association (DFB) licensing procedure. Red Bull GmbH and the club were close to a deal, but the plans were vetoed by the DFB, which rejected the proposed new club name "FC Red Bull Sachsen Leipzig" fearing too much influence from the company. After months of fan protests against Red Bull's involvement, which deteriorated into violence, the company officially abandoned the plans.

Red Bull GmbH then turned to the former West Germany. The company made contact with Hamburg-based club FC St. Pauli, and met representatives of the club to discuss a sponsorship deal. A short time before, supporters of FC St. Pauli had participated in protests against Red Bull's takeover of SV Austria Salzburg. Once it became clear to the Hamburg side that the company had plans that went far beyond conventional sponsoring, it immediately ended the contact, and the question was never considered by the club's management. Red Bull then made contact with TSV 1860 Munich. Negotiations began behind closed doors, but the club was not interested in an investment and ended the discussions.

In 2007, Red Bull GmbH made plans to invest in Fortuna Düsseldorf, a traditional club with more than 100 years of history. The plans became public, and it was revealed that the company wanted to acquire more than 50 percent of the shares. Rumours spread that the company wanted to rename the club "Red Bull Düsseldorf", or similar. This was immediately met with protests from club supporters. As with FC Sachsen Leipzig, Red Bull's offer also ran into legal difficulties: the statutes of the DFB did not allow changing a club name for advertising purposes, nor for an external investor to obtain a majority share. Eventually, the plans were soundly rejected by club members. The company began to reconsider the former East Germany.

Leipzig was considered a suitable place for an investment, with the city having a rich history in football, being the meeting place for the founding of the DFB and the home of the first German national football champions, VfB Leipzig. During East Germany's existence, local teams such as Lokomotive Leipzig and its rival, BSG Chemie Leipzig, played at the highest level of the East German football league system, and even on the international level. The current state of football there was, however, poor. No team from the city had played in the Bundesliga since 1994, and no team had played in a professional league since 1998. Its two best teams would soon play in the Oberliga, and local football was plagued by fan violence. The city hungered for top-level football. Leipzig had a population of around 500,000 inhabitants. The city thus had considerable economic strength and fan potential. At the same time, there were no Bundesliga clubs located anywhere near the city, which further strengthened the possibility of attracting sponsors and fans.

Leipzig was fortunate to have a well-developed infrastructure, in the form of an international airport, motorway connections, and a suitable stadium. The Zentralstadion was a former 2006 FIFA World Cup venue and the second-largest football stadium in the east of Germany, after the Olympiastadion in Berlin.

An investment in a club playing in one of the top divisions in Germany would have been a costly affair for Red Bull. From previous experience, the company knew that the existing traditions of such a club would hinder success in the league. It also knew that an investment in a club playing in one of the top divisions would meet legal difficulties, making such an investment risky. Instead, the company found that a newly established club, designed for the company, would be the better option for an investment. Early in 2009, Red Bull GmbH contacted the Saxony Football Association (SFV), about the procedure to establish a new club in Saxony.

A newly established club would need teams and a playing license. If it did not acquire a license from another club, it would have to start playing in the lowest tier league, the Kreisklasse. The company searched for a club playing in the Oberliga, since 2008 the fifth tier in the German football league system, and therefore not subject to the DFB licensing system. On the advice of media entrepreneur Michael Kölmel, the company was led to SSV Markranstädt, a small club from a town 13 kilometers west of Leipzig. The club was positively inclined to entering a partnership with a global company. Its president, Holger Nussbaum, wanted to secure the club's long-term finances, and designed a plan to engage Red Bull GmbH. Holger Nussbaum presented his plan to Kölmel, who saw his chance and decided to join in the deal. Assisted by Kölmel, Red Bull GmbH began negotiations with SSV Markranstädt. Five weeks after the negotiations began, SSV Markranstädt had agreed to sell its licence for the Oberliga to Red Bull GmbH. The cost was not disclosed, but SSV Markranstädt is believed to have received a compensation of 350,000 euro.

RasenBallsport Leipzig e.V. was founded on 19 May 2009. All seven founding members were either employees or agents of Red Bull GmbH. Andreas Sadlo was elected chairman, and Joachim Krug was hired as sporting director. Andreas Sadlo, another founding member, was a well-known football player agent, working for the agency "Stars & Friends". In order to avoid future objections from the German Football Association (DFB), Sadlo resigned as player agent, before taking the position of chairman. The statutes of the DFB would not allow a player agent to be involved in the operating affairs of a club. Krug had earlier been employed as coach and manager by Rot Weiss Ahlen, at that time known as LR Ahlen and sponsored by cosmetics manufacturer LR International.

RB Leipzig became the fifth football commitment in the Red Bull sporting portfolio, following Red Bull Salzburg in Austria, the New York Red Bulls in the United States, Red Bull Brasil (now Red Bull Bragantino II) in Brazil and Red Bull Ghana in Ghana. In contrast with previous clubs, RB Leipzig did not bear the corporate name. The statutes of the DFB would not permit a corporate name to be included in the club name. Instead, the club adopted the unusual name RasenBallsport, literally meaning "Lawn Ball Sports". By using the initials "RB", as in "Red Bull", the corporate identity could still be recognized.

RB Leipzig began as a partnership with fifth-division side SSV Markranstädt. The partnership meant that SSV Markranstädt would provide the initial core of RB Leipzig, as the starting point for RB's leap into German football. RB Leipzig acquired a playing license for the Oberliga, the top three men's teams and a senior men's team from SSV Markranstädt. The first team was completely taken over, with its training staff and its head coach, Tino Vogel, son of former East German footballer Eberhard Vogel.

The transfer of the licence for the Oberliga had to be approved by the North East German Football Association (NOFV). RB Leipzig would need at least four junior teams, including an A-junior team, to obtain the licence. In the deal, SSV Markranstädt had kept its junior department, and RB Leipzig lacked junior teams. Red Bull GmbH therefore approached Sachsen Leipzig. The club was experiencing financial issues, and could no longer finance its youth department. The NOFV approved the transfer of the playing right on 13 June 2009, and RB Leipzig was given one year to complete its stable of junior teams. The club then acquired four junior teams from Sachsen Leipzig. The Saxony Football Association (SFV) urged the acquisition, in order to prevent a talent exodus.

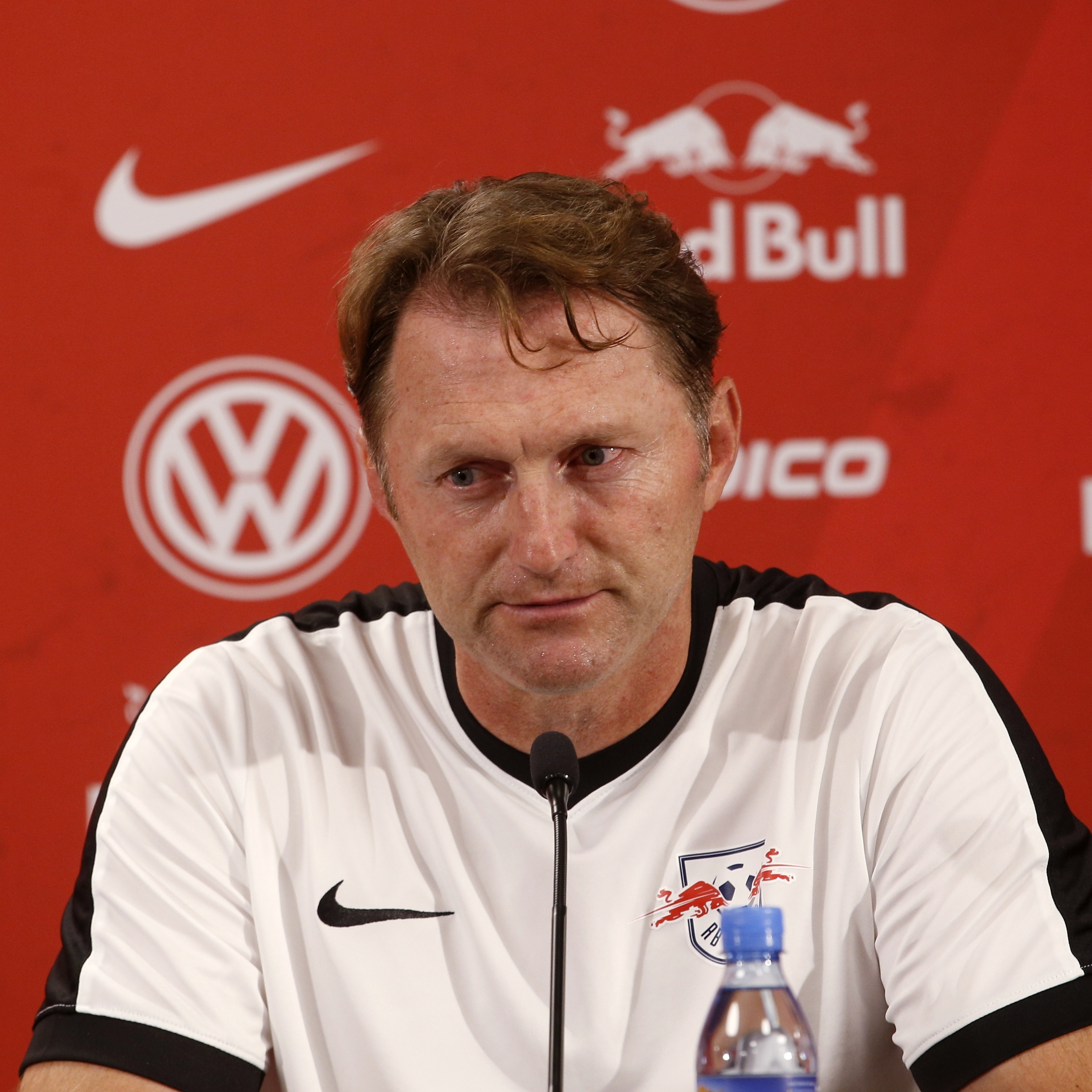
Ralph Hasenhüttl, the club's first manager in the Bundesliga

RB Leipzig would play its inaugural season in the Oberliga at the Stadion am Bad in Markranstädt. The stadium held 5,000 seats and traditionally the home ground of SSV Markranstädt. The plans were for the club to soon move to the far larger Zentralstadion, hopefully in 2010, after advancing to the Regionalliga. The stadium was owned by Michael Kölmel, who had been known to Red Bull GmbH for years and had, as a negotiation partner, facilitated the establishment of RB Leipzig. Michael Kölmel had himself been involved in local football previously, as a sponsor of Sachsen Leipzig. He was eager to find a strong tenant for the stadium, which last saw Sachsen Leipzig play in the Regionalliga behind closed doors. Negotiations between Red Bull GmbH and Michael Kölmel began immediately upon the club's founding. Red Bull GmbH reserved the naming right to the stadium in June 2009, meaning that the name could not be sold to another company.

On its founding, RB Leipzig aimed to play first-division Bundesliga football within eight years, following the model previously used by Red Bull GmbH in Austria and the United States. It was predicted that Red Bull GmbH would invest 100 million euros in the club over a period of ten years, and Mateschitz openly spoke of the possibility of ultimately winning the German championship. The last team from Leipzig to do so was VfB Leipzig in 1913.

=== 2009–2016: Rise through the divisions ===
After some previously scheduled games had to be canceled due to safety concerns, RB Leipzig played its first match on 10 July 2009, a friendly match against the Landesliga club SV Bannewitz. The match was played at the Stadion am Bad in Markranstädt and ended with a 5–0 win for RB Leipzig. The club played its first competitive match on 31 July 2009, in the first round of the Saxony Cup against VfK Blau–Weiß Leipzig, winning 5–0. The club then played its first league match away to FC Carl Zeiss Jena II on 8 August 2009. The match ended 1–1.

During the further course of the season, RB Leipzig suffered its first defeat on 13 September 2009, in a match against Budissa Bautzen. The club was claimed the title of Herbstmeister, as they stood in first place after the first half of the 2009–10 season. The team returned for the second half of the season stronger, having signed the experienced midfielder and 2. Bundesliga player Timo Rost from Energie Cottbus in January 2010. The team secured first place in the 2009–10 NOFV–Oberliga Süd at the 25th matchday, thus earning promotion to the 2010–11 Regionalliga Nord. The team finished the season with a goal difference of +57 (74 scored and 17 conceded), having suffered only two defeats. The playing right for the Regionalliga was issued by the DFB on 4 May 2010. RB Leipzig targeted a place in the 2010–11 DFB–Pokal, which would have been won by winning the 2009–10 Saxony Cup. The team reached the quarter-finals in the Saxony Cup, but was eliminated after a defeat against FSV Zwickau on 13 November 2009.

The incumbent chairman, Andreas Saldo, left the club in January 2010 and the position was assumed by the former Hamburger SV sporting director and incumbent sporting director for the common Red Bull football commitment Dietmar Beiersdorfer. One day after the last match of the 2009–10 season, Beiersdorfer released head coach Tino Vogel, assistant coach Lars Weißenberger and sporting director Joachim Krug from their positions. This action was done after Red Bull owner Dietrich Mateschitz had announced a change in strategy. According to the new strategy, RB Leipzig was going to represent the key project in the football commitment of the company, in place of Red Bull Salzburg. Tomas Oral was announced as the new head coach on 18 June 2010.

The players Christian Mittenzwei, Sebastian Hauck, Stefan Schumann, Toni Jurascheck and Michael Lerchl did not receive new contracts for the following Regionalliga season, while players Frank Räbsch, Ronny Kujat and two other players ended their careers.

Team development
Season 2008–09	Season 2009–10	Season 2010–11
SSV Markranstädt	RB Leipzig	RB Leipzig
	ESV Delitzsch	RB Leipzig II
SSV Markranstädt II	RB Leipzig II	SSV Markranstädt
	ESV Delitzsch II	ESV Delitzsch
SSV Markranstädt III	RB Leipzig III	SSV Markranstädt II
	RB Leipzig IV	SSV Markranstädt III

Before entry to the Regionalliga, there were two significant changes in the club. The club returned the second, third and fourth team to SSV Markranstädt. In order to replace the reserve team, the club adopted the first team of ESV Delitzsch as its reserve team and purchased its playing right for the Bezirksliga Leipzig. The first team moved from the Stadion am Bad in Markranstädt, to make the Zentralstadion in Leipzig its new home arena. The former 2006 FIFA World Cup venue was simultaneously renamed Red Bull Arena. The opening of the Red Bull Arena was celebrated on 24 July 2010 with a friendly match against the German vice-champions Schalke 04 in front of 21,566 spectators. The match ended with a 1–2 loss for RB Leipzig. The first team played its last game at the Stadion am Bad six days later on 30 July 2010, a friendly match against Hertha BSC, which ended with a 2–1 win for RB Leipzig.

The 2010–11 Regionalliga season started with a series of draws, the first one on 6 August 2010 against Türkiyemspor Berlin in front of 4,028 spectators at the Red Bull Arena. The first win came at the 4th matchday, in an away match against Holstein Kiel, which ended 1–2 for RB Leipzig. The first home win came immediately after, on the fifth matchday, in a match against 1. FC Magdeburg, which ended 2–1 for RB Leipzig. After a quiet start to the season, the club found itself chasing Chemnitzer FC, themselves also seeking promotion. At the end of the year, RB Leipzig confirmed its ambitions to gain promotion, by signing Brazilian midfielder Thiago Rockenbach. The club had signed forward Carsten Kammlott, considered a promising young talent, and the experienced Leipzig-born defender Tim Sebastian, during the summer.

The club finished its first season in the Regionalliga in 4th place, thus missing out on promotion. However, under coach Tomas Oral, the club succeeded in winning the 2010–11 Saxony Cup after defeating Chemnitzer FC 1–0 in the final on 1 June 2011 in front of 13,958 spectators at the Red Bull Arena. By winning the 2010–11 Saxony Cup, the club won its first title in club history. It also qualified to participate in the 2011–12 DFB-Pokal. Because the club missed out on promotion during the second half of the 2010–11 season, Peter Pacult from Rapid Wien was announced as the new head coach for the 2011–12 season on 4 May 2011. Almost simultaneously, the club announced that sporting director Thomas Linke had been released from his position, having been employed for only 10 weeks, from February 2011. Various media suspected a connection between the signing of Pacult and the departure of Linke.

Also, several players left the team, among them Lars Müller, Sven Neuhaus, Thomas Kläsener and Nico Frommer, all participants in the previous Saxony Cup final. With Daniel Rosin, Timo Rost and Benjamin Bellot, only three players from the former Oberliga team remained in the team for the 2011–12 Regionalliga season, while the former international Ingo Hertzsch as a fourth of these players remained in the club. Hertzsch ended his professional career after the 2010–11 season, but went on to join the reserve team, RB Leipzig II, and the RB Leipzig business operation. On 29 July 2011, RB Leipzig made its debut in the DFB-Pokal, in front of 31,212 spectators at the Red Bull Arena. The team knocked Bundesliga club VfL Wolfsburg out of the first round of the cup, beating them 3–2 after a hat-trick by Daniel Frahn. The team was eliminated in the next round, defeated 0–1 by FC Augsburg. The 2011–12 Regionalliga season saw the largest win in club history, when RB Leipzig defeated SV Wilhelmshaven 8–2 on 19 February 2012. After a decisive 2–2 draw against VfL Wolfsburg II at the 33rd matchday, the club missed out on promotion for the second time in the Regionalliga, finishing the season in 3rd place.

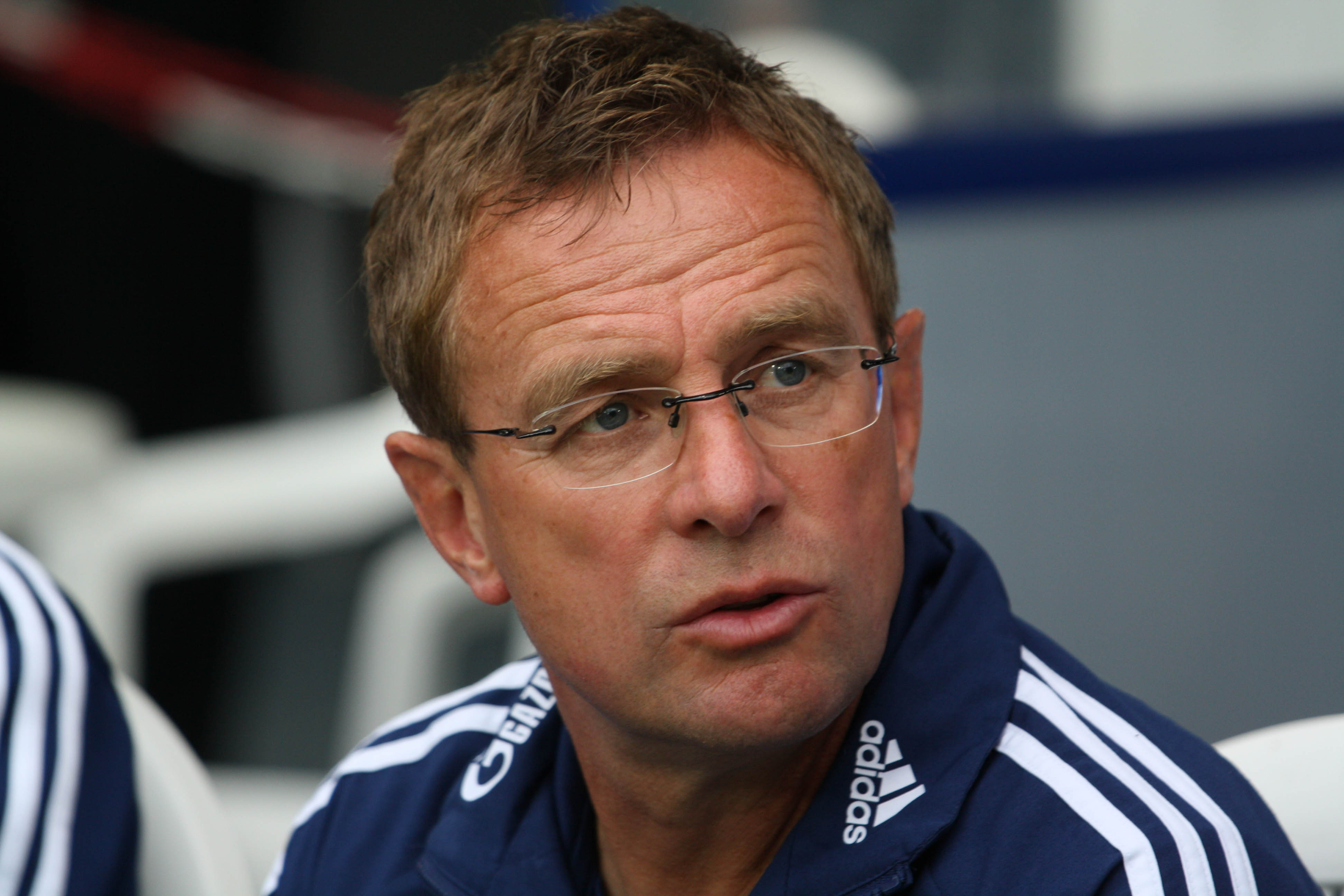
Ralf Rangnick in 2011, as head coach of Schalke 04

The 2012–13 season in the reformed Regionalliga Nordost began with major personnel changes. Former Schalke 04 head coach Ralf Rangnick was introduced as the new sporting director. Coinciding with his arrival, he replaced head coach Peter Pacult with former SG Sonnenhof Großaspach coach Alexander Zorniger. The season proved more successful than the previous two. The club won the Herbstmeister title with two matchdays left of the first half of the season, after defeating FSV Zwickau 1–0 away. The team then secured first place in the 2012–13 Regionalliga Nordost at the 18th matchday, after the second placed club FC Carl Zeiss Jena lost a match against Berliner AK 07 on 7 May 2013 and, as a consequence, were no longer able to overtake RB.

The 2012–13 Saxony Cup was another success. The club reached the final for the second time in club history and, as in 2011, the opponent was Chemnitzer FC. The team won the final on 15 May 2013 by 4–2 in front of 16,864 spectators at the Red Bull Arena. The crowd number set a new record for a Saxony Cup final, breaking the previous record from 2011. By winning the 2012–13 Saxony Cup, the club was also qualified to participate in the 2013–14 DFB-Pokal. As the winner of the 2012–13 Regionallig Nordost, RB Leipzig won a place in the qualification for the 3. Liga. The club was drawn against Sportfreunde Lotte from the Regionalliga West. RB Leipzig won the first leg on 29 May 2013 by 2–0. The match was played at the Red Bull Arena in front of 30,104 spectators, a crowd number which set a new record for matches in the 4th division.

The second leg was played on 2 June 2013 and ended 2–2 after two goals to RB Leipzig during extra time. The result meant that RB Leipzig had finally won promotion to the 3. Liga, after three seasons in the Regionalliga. In the 2013–14 season, RB Leipzig made its first appearance in the 3. Liga in club history. The club signed Anthony Jung from FSV Frankfurt, Tobias Willers from Sportfreunde Lotte, Joshua Kimmich from the U19 team of VfB Stuttgart, André Luge from FSV Zwickau, Christos Papadimitriou from AEK Athens, Yussuf Poulsen from Lyngby and Denis Thomalla from TSG Hoffenheim during the summer.

RB Leipzig was eliminated by FC Augsburg in the first round of the 2013–14 DFB-Pokal on 2 August 2013 after losing 0–2 at the Red Bull Arena. The defeat brought an end to a year-long series without defeat in competitive matches. The 2013–14 3. Liga had a more promising start. The team won its first match, against Hallescher FC away, by 1–0 on 19 July 2013 and kept an undefeated streak until 31 August 2013, when the team lost 1–2 to first placed team SV Wehen Wiesbaden away. On 5 October 2013, RB Leipzig again met the first placed team. SV Wehen Wiesbaden had lost its first-place position to 1. FC Heidenheim only one week after its defeat of RB Leipzig. 1. FC Heidenheim would defend it until the end of the season. RB Leipzig defeated 1. FC Heidenheim by 2–0 after a convincing performance at the Voith-Arena and climbed to third place. During the winter break, players Christos Papadimitriou, Juri Judt, Carsten Kammlott and Bastian Schulz left the team. In return, the team was joined by Diego Demme from Paderborn 07, Federico Palacios Martínez from VfL Wolfsburg, Mikko Sumusalo from HJK Helsinki and Georg Teigl from Red Bull Salzburg.

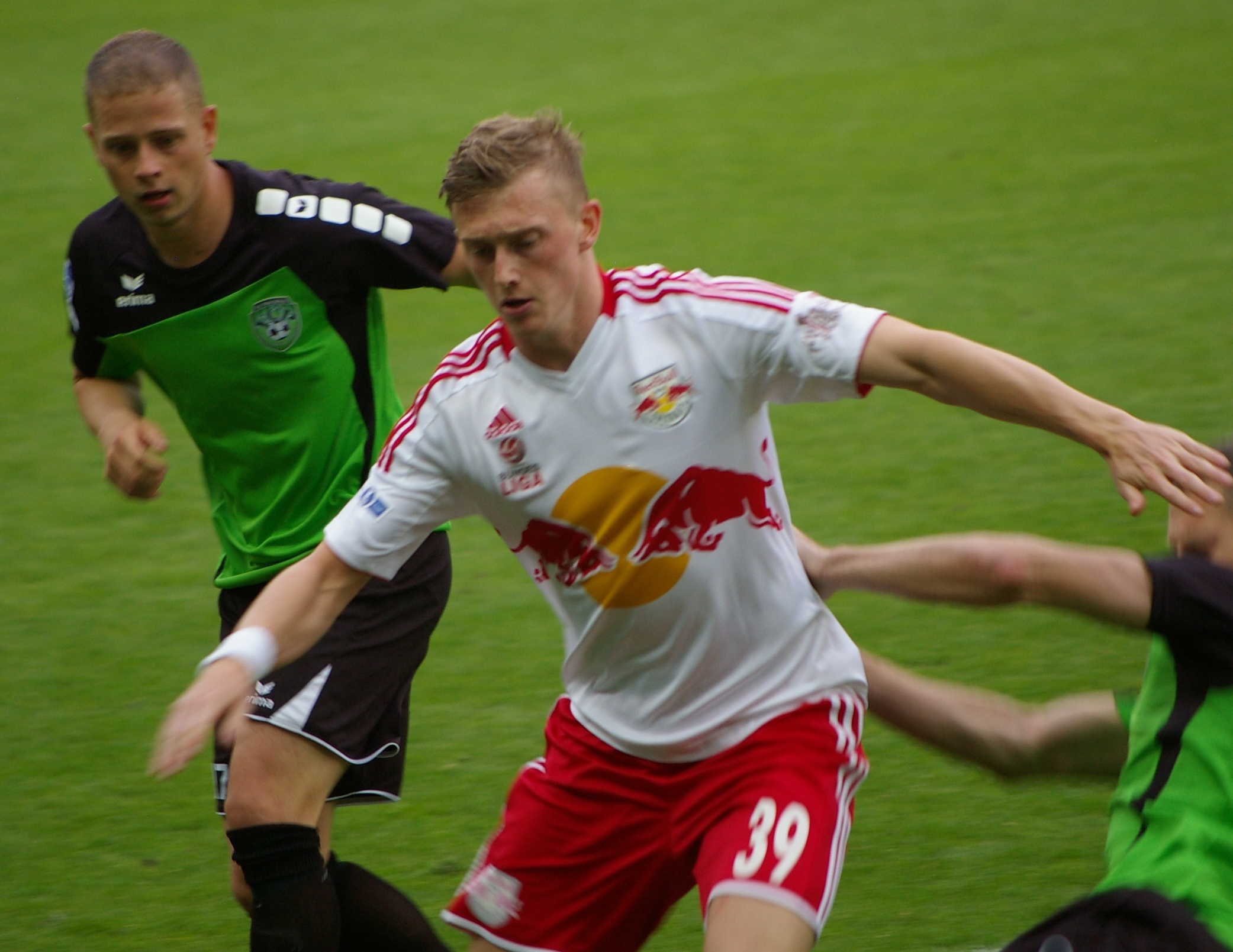
Georg Teigl playing a match for Red Bull Salzburg in May 2013

After losing 1–2 away to MSV Duisburg on 1 February 2014, the team would not concede a single defeat for the rest of the season. A thrilling duel with Darmstadt 98 appeared, with both teams fighting for the crucial second place. The two teams met at the 35th matchday, on 19 April 2014. RB Leipzig came out as the winner, defeating SV Darmstadt 98 by 1–0 in front of 39,147 spectators at the Red Bull Arena. RB Leipzig secured the second place and direct promotion to the 2. Bundesliga two weeks later, after defeating last placed team 1. FC Saarbrücken 5–1 in front of a nearly sold out Red Bull Arena on 3 May 2014. The crowd of 42,713 spectators set a new club record.

By finishing the season in second place, RB Leipzig won promotion to the 2. Bundesliga and became the first team since the introduction of the 3. Liga to win promotion to the 2. Bundesliga after only one season. Following promotion to the 2. Bundesliga, the organization responsible for licensing was no longer the DFB, but instead the German Football League (DFL). The DFL announced its first decision in the licensing process on 22 April 2014. RB Leipzig was to be given a license for the 2014–15 2. Bundesliga season, but only under certain conditions. Criticism mounted that the club lacked in participation, that club management was too concentrated in only a handful of people and that the club was not independent enough from Red Bull GmbH. To ensure independence and improve participation, the DFL set up three requirements that the club had to meet in order to obtain a license for the 2014–15 2. Bundesliga season. One of the requirements was to redesign the crest, as the crest too closely resembled the corporate logo of Red Bull GmbH. A second requirement was to change the composition of the club's organizational bodies. A third requirement was to lower the membership fees and open up the association for new members. The German legal magazine Legal Tribune Online assessed all three requirements set up by the DFL as legally questionable.

RB Leipzig filed an appeal on 30 April 2014. Sporting director Ralf Rangnick appeared in the media and suggested compromise with the DFL, stating that what the jerseys look like were not as important as those who would be wearing them. The appeal was rejected in a second decision by the DFL on 8 May 2014. Red Bull GmbH owner Dietrich Mateschitz spoke out in media, openly criticizing the decision by the DFL. He described the requirements as a "decapitation request" and categorically rejected another season in the 3. Liga, ultimately threatening to end the project in Leipzig if the license was not given.

RB Leipzig filed a second appeal on 12 May 2014. The DFL licensing committee was set to make a decision on the second appeal on 15 May 2014, before making its final decision on 28 May 2014. Sporting director Ralf Rangnick confirmed that the club was still in talks with the DFL and expressed optimism around the license. On 15 May 2014, a compromise was announced. The compromise meant that the club had to redesign its crest and ensure that club management was independent from Red Bull GmbH.

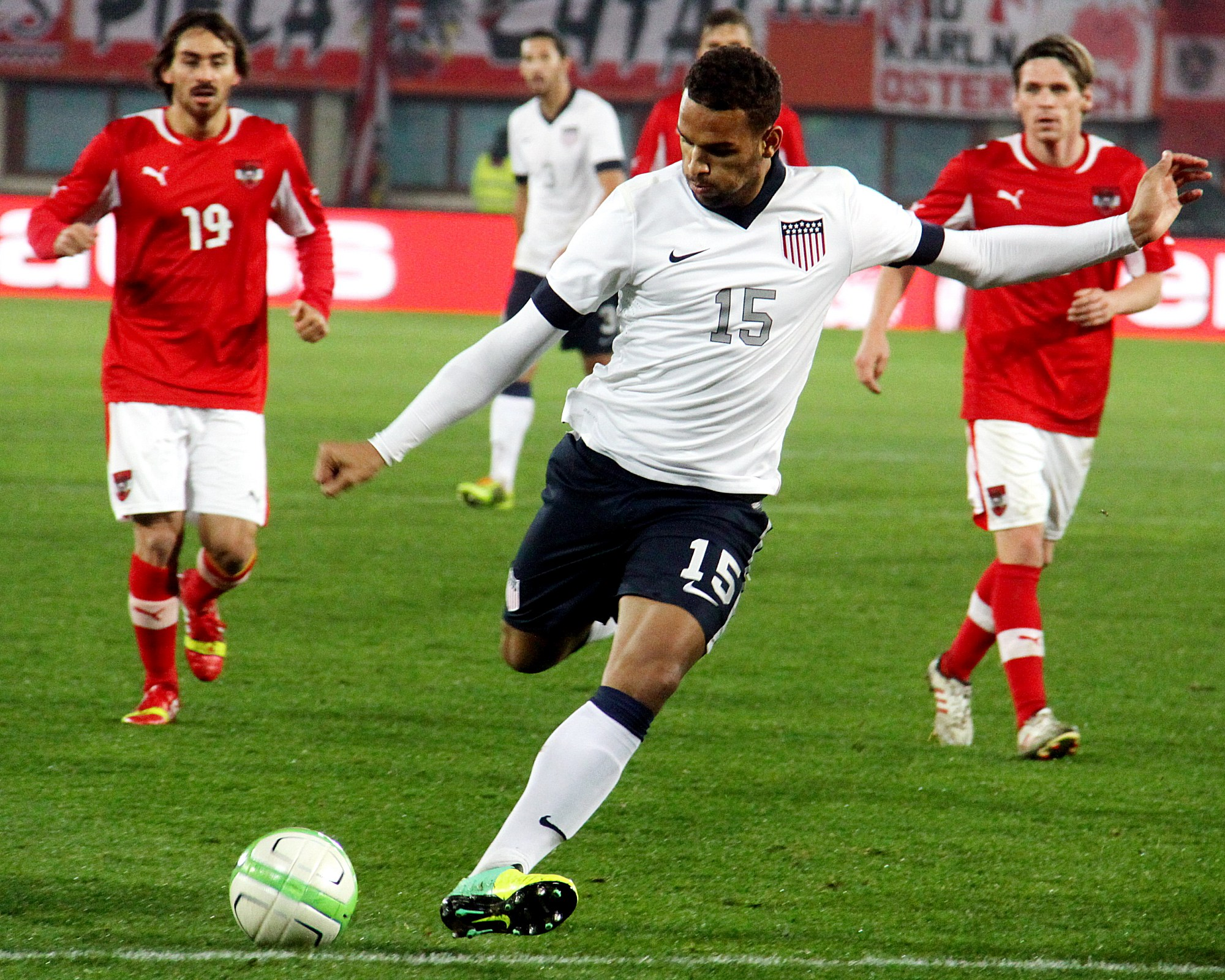
Terrence Boyd playing a match for the United States in November 2013

The club signed numerous players before the 2014–15 season, among them Rani Khedira from VfB Stuttgart, Lukas Klostermann from VfL Bochum, Marcel Sabitzer from Red Bull Salzburg, Terrence Boyd from Rapid Wien and Massimo Bruno from Anderlecht. Several players also left the team. Massimo Bruno and Marcel Sabitzer were immediately transferred on loan to FC Red Bull Salzburg. Fabian Bredlow was transferred on loan to FC Liefering, André Luge was transferred on loan to SV Elversberg and Thiago Rockenbach Silva joined Hertha BSC II as a free agent. The club spent an estimated sum of approximately 12 million euros on new players during the summer of 2014. The sum was large enough to put the club in eighth place of all clubs in the Bundesliga and 2. Bundesliga, thus spending more than half of all clubs in the first division.

RB Leipzig played a series of friendly matches during the 2014–15 pre-season. On 18 July 2014, the team defeated Paris Saint-Germain 4–2 in front of 35,796 spectators at the Red Bull Arena. The first goal was scored by Terrence Boyd, scoring his second goal in his second match for his new club. Terrence Boyd received the jersey of Zlatan Ibrahimović from Paris Saint-Germain after the match. On 26 July 2014, the team defeated Queens Park Rangers with 2–0 at the Stadion der Freundschaft in Gera. Both goals were scored by Yussuf Poulsen.

The 2014–15 2. Bundesliga season began with 0–0 draw against VfR Aalen on 2 August 2014, followed up by a couple of wins and another draw. The first defeat in the league came at the 6th matchday, losing 1–2 against Union Berlin at the Red Bull Arena on 21 September 2014. After the 7th matchday, the club stood at second place in the league. RB Leipzig was drawn against Paderborn 07 in the first round of the 2014–15 DFB-Pokal. The team won the match 2–1 in extra time at the Red Bull Arena on 16 August 2014. In the second round, the club faced Erzgebirge Aue, who they defeated 3–1 in extra time at the Red Bull Arena on 29 October 2015, qualifying for the round of 16 for first time in club history. RB Leipzig then released its own club magazine Klub on 6 October 2014.

After a run of poor results, the club had dropped down to 7th place by the 13th matchday. On 23 November 2014, RB Leipzig defeated FC St. Pauli 4–1 in front of 38,660 spectators at the Red Bull Arena. Two goals were scored by Terrence Boyd and the club climbed to 5th place. The success, however, was followed by a draw against SV Sandhausen. On 7 December 2014, the team met first placed team Ingolstadt 04. RB Leipzig lost 0–1, and the result meant that the club now stood at 8th place. RB Leipzig strengthened the team during the winter break by signing Omer Damari from Austria Wien, Emil Forsberg from Malmö and players Rodnei and Yordy Reyna from Red Bull Salzburg. The club spent an estimated sum of 10,7 million euros on new players during the winter break, a sum which covered almost all transfer expenditures during the period for the whole of 2. Bundesliga.

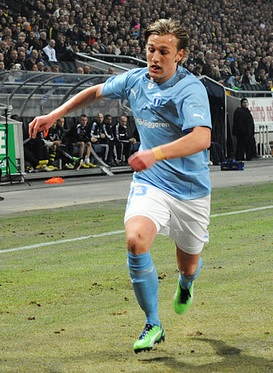
Emil Forsberg playing a match for Malmö against AIK in June 2013

On 6 February 2015, the club lost 2–0 to Erzgebirge Aue. As a consequence, the club had now played four matches without a win and had lost contact with the top placed teams. On the following Tuesday evening, the club summoned Alexander Zorninger to a meeting, and on Tuesday night, the club took the decision to part ways with him after the season. The decision had been taken by the club management in consultation with Red Bull GmbH owner Dietrich Mateschitz. The next morning, Alexander Zorniger announced his own decision to leave immediately. The club received criticism for its decision. Under Alexander Zorniger, the club had risen from the Regionalliga to the 2. Bundesliga. Some media considered the decision to be a merciless one. Incumbent RB Leipzig U17 coach Achim Beierlorzer was announced as interim head coach for the rest of the season.

On 5 March 2015, RB Leipzig met VfL Wolfsburg in the third round of the 2014–15 DFB-Pokal. The club was eliminated after being defeated 2–0 at the Red Bull Arena. The match was attended by 43,348 spectators. It was the first time in club history that the stadium had been completely sold out. The preferred candidate of sporting director Ralf Rangnick as new head coach from the summer was former Mainz 05 coach Thomas Tuchel, but the negotiations with Tuchel failed. Another candidate was Bayer Leverkusen junior coach Sascha Lewandowski, but he too declined the offer. In May 2015, sporting director Ralf Rangnick was himself announced as new head coach from the summer, with Achim Beierlorzer as his assistant. Ralf Rangnick was planned to serve this double job for one season. RB Leipzig finished the 2014–15 2. Bundesliga season in fifth place.

Before the 2015–16 season, RB Leipzig invested further in strengthening the team, signing Davie Selke from Werder Bremen, Atınç Nukan from Beşiktaş, Marcel Halstenberg from FC St. Pauli and Willi Orban from Kaiserslautern. Selke was signed for an estimated €8 million, Nukan for an estimated €5 million and Halstenberg for an estimated €3 million. Meanwhile, Joshua Kimmich was sold to Bayern Munich and Rodnei left to join 1860 Munich as free agent. RB Leipzig also made transfers with its unofficial sister club, FC Red Bull Salzburg. As at several times in the past, three players were signed on a free transfer, among them the Austrian national Stefan Ilsanker. They were joined by Massimo Bruno and Marcel Sabitzer, returning to RB Leipzig from being on loan. These transfers provoked anger among the fans of Red Bull Salzburg. For several years, Red Bull Salzburg had transferred some of its best players to RB Leipzig. Fans of Red Bull Salzburg were heard singing chants against RB Leipzig during a game in the ÖFB-Cup in April 2015, after Austrian media had reported that Stefan Ilsanker could move to Leipzig during the summer.

The signing of Davie Selke was record breaking, as it made him the most expensive player ever signed in the 2. Bundesliga's history. In total, the club spent a sum of approximately €18.6 million on new players during the summer of 2015, more than all other clubs in the 2. Bundesliga together. During the pre-season 2015–16, RB Leipzig defeated Southampton 5–4 in Bischofshofen on 8 July 2015, and Rubin Kazan 1–0 in Leogang on 12 July 2015. The team then beat Hapoel Tel Aviv 3–0 at the Red Bull Arena on 18 July 2015.

The club was drawn against VfL Osnabrück in the first round of the 2015–16 DFB-Pokal. The match was played at the Osnatel-Arena in Osnabrück on 10 August 2015. After Osnabrück scored in the first minute, the home fans celebrated so violently that barriers and safety net partially collapsed and the match had to be interrupted. The match was restarted and Osnabrück led the match into the second half. In the 71st minute, referee Martin Petersen was badly hit in the head by a lighter, thrown from the home stand. The lighter had been thrown after Petersen had tried to resolve an argument between Davie Selke and Osnabrück substitute Michael Hohnstedt, resulting from a controversial situation in the Osnabrück penalty area. The match was again interrupted, and later cancelled. RB Leipzig offered a replay, but the DFB decided the match to be counted as lost by Osnabrück 0–2. RB Leipzig later decided to waive 20,000 euros of the 50,500 euros VfL Osnabrück owed the club for its share of the revenues from the match. RB Leipzig also allowed the payment of the remaining 30,500 to be postponed until the next year.

In the midst of the 2015 European migrant crisis, the club, staff, players and fans of RB Leipzig showed support for refugees. In August 2015, RB Leipzig donated €50,000 to the City of Leipzig for its work with helping asylum seekers. The club also sold 60 containers from its training center, including sanitary facilities, to the city, in order to serve as accommodation for asylum seekers. The club had originally invested around €500,000 in the containers. Moreover, the club became patrons of the initiative "Willkommen im Fußball", giving refugee children the opportunity to play football. Staff and players of RB Leipzig collected and donated sporting equipment and private clothes to refugees. Also sporting director and head coach Ralf Rangnick participated in the donation, with personal concern for the commitment, citing his own background as being a child to refugees. His parents had met in a refugee camp at Glauchau, his father had fled from Königsberg and his mother from Breslau. By an initiative of fans, RB Leipzig invited refugees on free admission to watch its home match against SC Paderborn on 11 September 2015. 450 refugees attended the match, and they were met and accompanied by 200 fans beforehand.

RB Leipzig advanced to the second round of the DFB-Pokal, being eliminated after losing 3–0 to a strong playing SpVgg Unterhaching from the Regionalliga Bayern at the Alpenbauer Sportpark on 27 October 2015. After defeating SV Sandhausen 2–1 away at the 13th matchday on 1 November 2015, RB Leipzig stood at first place in the league. The position was however quickly lost already at the next matchday, with the team being surpassed by SC Freiburg and FC St. Pauli. But, following a series of wins, the team returned to the leading position on 13 December 2015. RB Leipzig made only few transfers during the winter break. Defender Tim Sebastian, who had been in the team since 2010 and who had once served as captain, left to join SC Paderborn, and midfielder Zsolt Kalmár left to join FSV Frankfurt on loan.

RB Leipzig held the leading position in the league until the 27th matchday, when it was again lost to SC Freiburg, after the team suffered a 3–1 defeat away against 1.FC Nürnberg on 20 March 2016. The team now stood at second place in the league, only three points ahead of 1. FC Nürnberg in third place. RB Leipzig then recorded two straight wins and expanded the distance to six points. But with only three matches left of the league season, the distance had shrunk to four points. RB Leipzig finally secured a second place in the league and direct promotion to the Bundesliga at the 33rd matchday, after defeating Karlsruher SC 2–0 in front of 42,559 spectators at the Red Bull Arena on 8 May 2016. The promotion was celebrated together with 20,000 supporters at the Market Square in front of the Old Town Hall in central Leipzig on 16 May 2016. Leipzig Mayor Burkhard Jung received the team before the celebration.

At the end of the season, Ralf Rangnick was to resign as head coach, in order to be able to focus on his job as sporting director. German media had during the season speculated on several potential candidates for new head coach, including Markus Gisdol, Sandro Schwarz, Jocelyn Gourvennec, René Weiler, and, notably, Markus Weinzierl. On 6 May 2016, Ralph Hasenhüttl was announced as new head coach. Ralph Hasenhüttl had been head coach of Ingolstadt 04 since October 2013, having brought the team from the bottom of the 2. Bundesliga to the Bundesliga, and also managed to defend the spot in the top tier during the 2015–16 season.

=== 2016–present: Bundesliga era ===
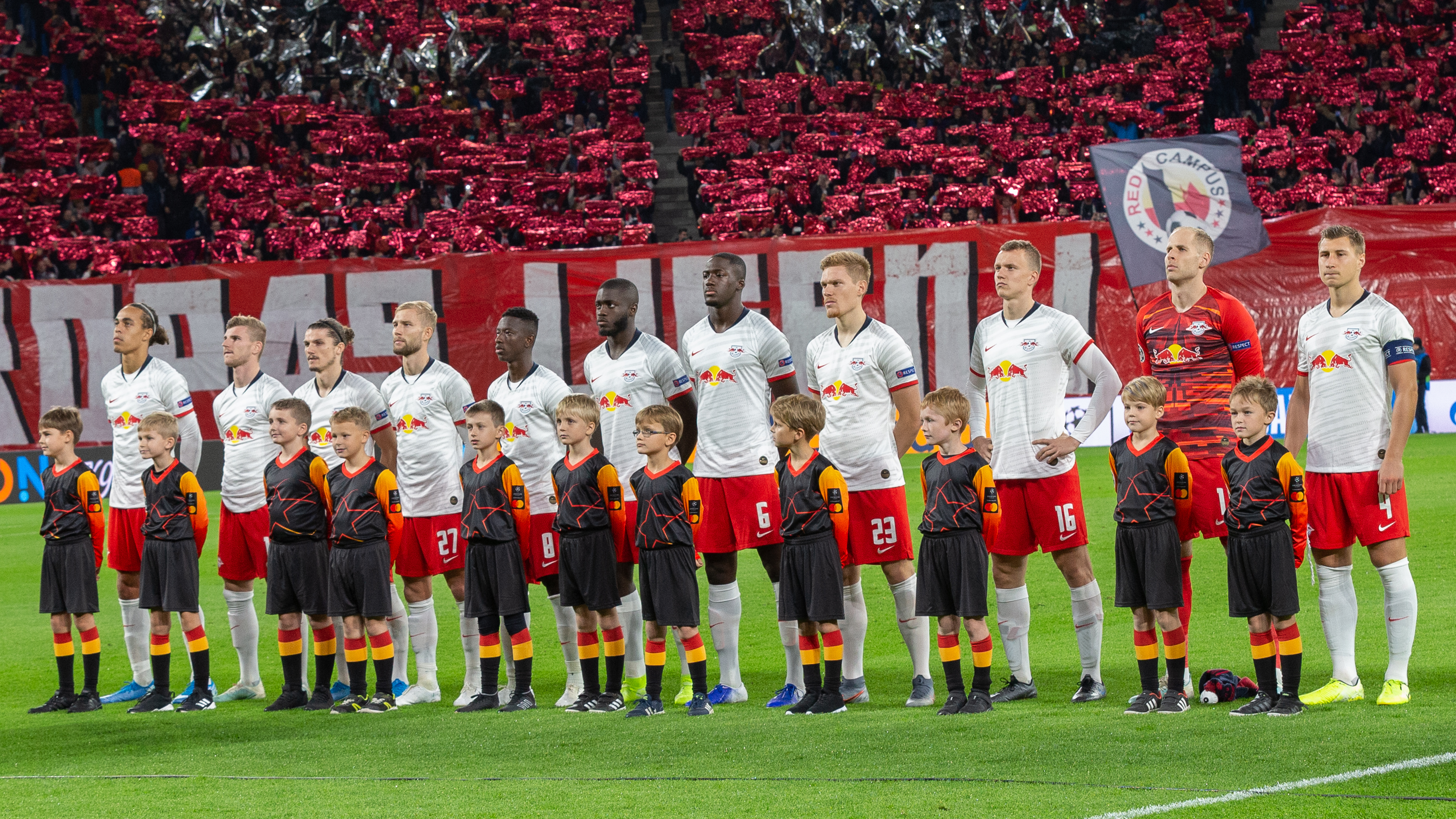
RB Leipzig in the UEFA Champions League

RB Leipzig remained undefeated in the first thirteen league matches of the 2016–17 season, breaking a record for the longest undefeated streak of a promoted team to the Bundesliga. The team finished the 11th matchday in first place, and became the first team from the area of former East Germany to hold the leading position since the 1991–92 Bundesliga season, when Hansa Rostock stood at first place on 31 August 1991 and held the position for three matchdays, relinquishing it after a loss against FC Ingolstadt.

RB Leipzig became the first Bundesliga debutant, since German reunification, to qualify for a European tournament, doing so with a 4–0 win against SC Freiburg on 15 April 2017. They were also the first team from the former East Germany to qualify for a European tournament since Union Berlin qualified for the 2001–02 UEFA Cup. Subsequently, Leipzig qualified for the 2017–18 UEFA Champions League after beating Hertha BSC 4–1 at the Olympiastadion on 6 May 2017, two days before the anniversary of the club's promotion to Bundesliga.

The following season, Leipzig finished in 6th position and also reached the quarterfinals of the 2017–18 UEFA Europa League competition, after being transferred from the 2017–18 UEFA Champions League group stage, which was finished in 3rd position. On 16 May 2018, Ralph Hasenhüttl resigned as head coach, after an extension of his contract was denied. Before the next season, Rangnick was announced as new coach for one year, to be followed by Julian Nagelsmann by the beginning of the 2019–20 season. RB Leipzig finished the 2018–19 Bundesliga season in 3rd position, with a total of 66 points. This ensured them qualification in the 2019–20 UEFA Champions League. In addition, a win against Hamburger SV on 23 April 2019, RB Leipzig reached the DFB-Pokal final for the first time, where they faced Bayern Munich on 25 May. Bayern Munich thrashed RB Leipzig 3–0. On 1 June 2019, Rangnick announced his resignation as sporting director of RB Leipzig after seven years and moved to the Red Bull company as "Head of Sport and Development Soccer". His successor as sporting director was Markus Krösche.

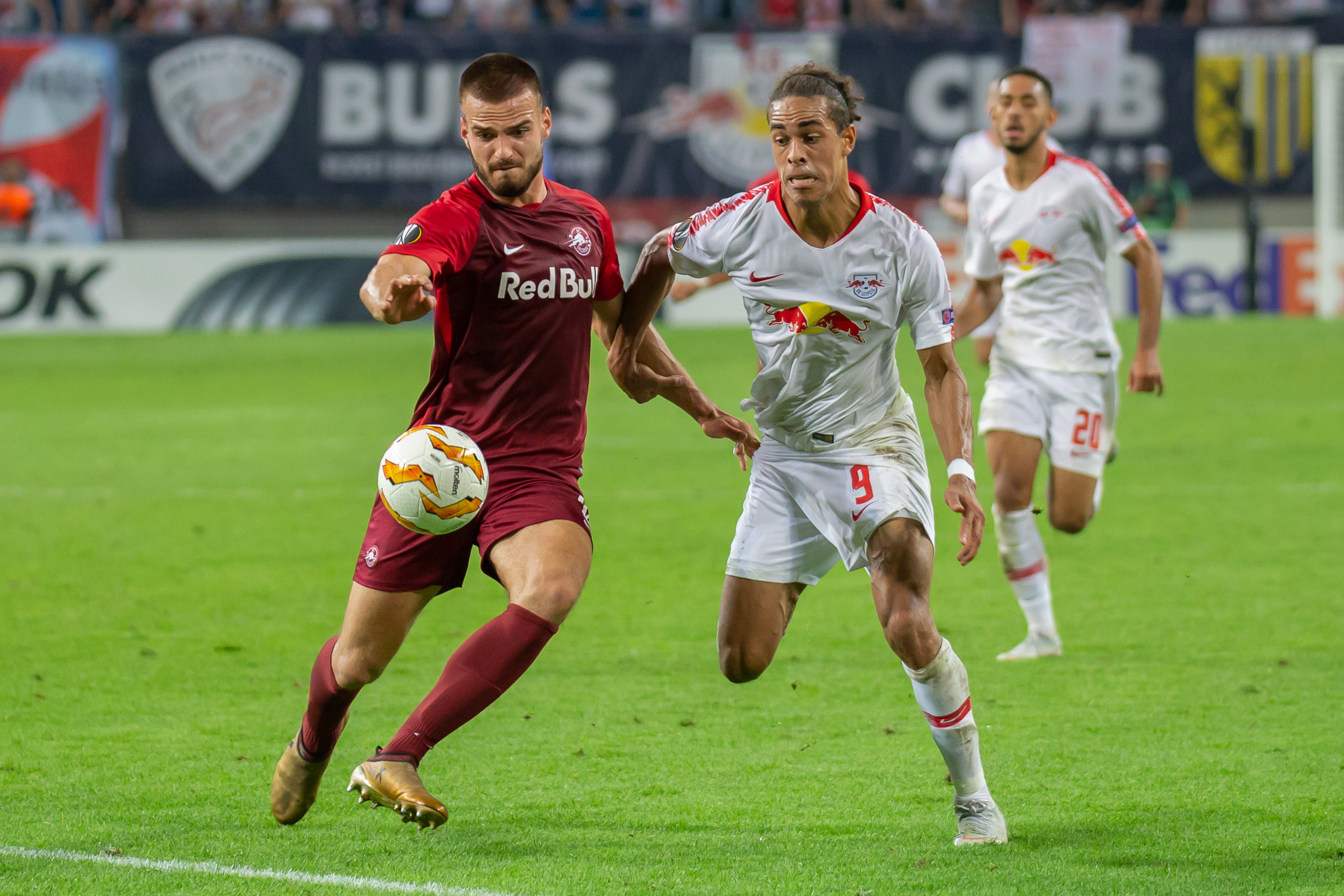
Yussuf Poulsen against Salzburg

In the 2019–20 UEFA Champions League, RB Leipzig won their group ahead of Lyon, Benfica and Zenit Saint Petersburg. After beating Tottenham Hotspur 4–0 on aggregate in the Round of 16, Leipzig then had a 2–1 win against Atlético Madrid in the quarter-final, with a late goal of American midfielder Tyler Adams, to reach the semi-final. But Paris Saint-Germain thrashed RB Leipzig 3–0 in the semi-final.

Under coach Domenico Tedesco, RB Leipzig reached the semi-finals of the 2021–22 UEFA Europa League, in which they were eliminated by Rangers 3–2 on aggregate, and won their first major title in the DFB-Pokal Final 4–2 on penalties against SC Freiburg. On 30 July 2022, RB Leipzig faced Bayern Munich in their first DFL Supercup at the Red Bull Arena, where they lost 5–3. On 7 September 2022, Tedesco was sacked following a 4–1 home defeat against Shakhtar Donetsk in the opening match of the 2022–23 UEFA Champions League. On 3 June 2023, RB Leipzig won their second consecutive DFB-Pokal title after a 2–0 win against Eintracht Frankfurt in the final. They also won their maiden DFL-Supercup on 13 August 2023, beating Bayern Munich 3–0, a revenge for the previous year's Supercup loss. On 30 March 2025, Marco Rose was dismissed as head coach after some poor results in the 2024–25 season. By the end of the season, RB Leipzig finished seventh in the league, missing out on European competition for the first time since their promotion to Bundesliga in 2016.

== Colours and crest ==
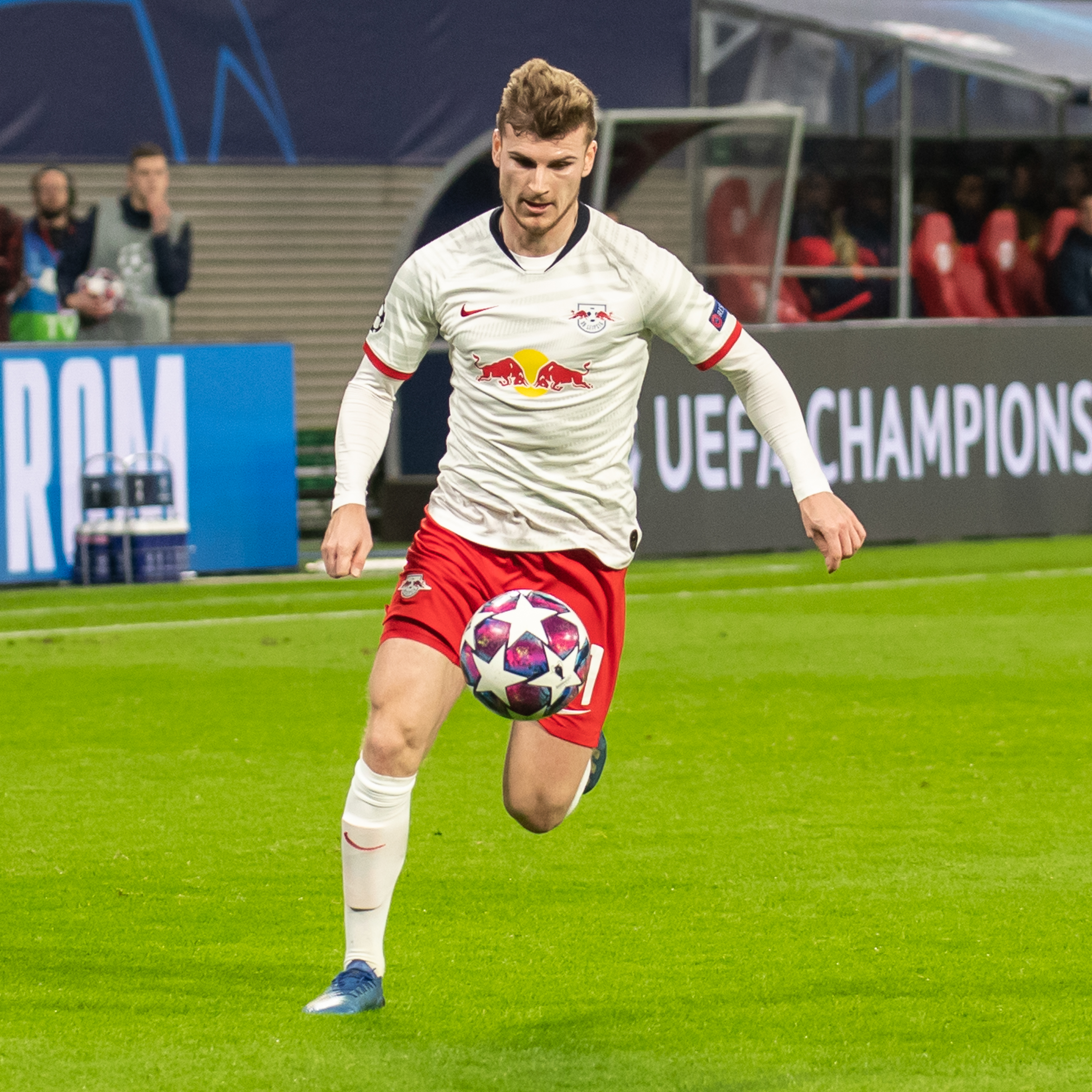
2020 season kit featuring club's forward Timo Werner

RB Leipzig play in the traditional red and white colours of Red Bull football teams. All crests proposed at the club's founding were rejected by the Saxony Football Association (SFV), as they were considered copies of the corporate logo of Red Bull GmbH. The team therefore played its inaugural season in 2009–10 without a crest. RB Leipzig later proposed a new crest, which was eventually accepted by the SFV in May 2010. The crest was slightly different from the crests used by other Red Bull football teams. The two bulls had been altered in shape and a few strokes added. The crest was used from the 2010–11 Regionalliga season until the end of the 2013–14 3. Liga season. The German Football League (DFL) rejected it however, during the license procedure for the 2014–15 2. Bundesliga season. As part of a compromise with the DFL, the club agreed to redesign its crest and introduced the current crest. The current crest is significantly different from the crests used by other Red Bull football teams, although it is identical to the modified crest used by Red Bull Salzburg for international matches and due to UEFA regulations. The yellow sun has been changed in favor of a football and the initials of "RasenBallsport" have been relocated to the bottom of the crest and are no longer highlighted in red.

=== Sponsorship ===
Period	Supplier	Shirt Sponsor	Sleeve Sponsor
2009–2014	Adidas	Red Bull	None
2014–2017	Nike	Red Bull	None
2017–2021	Nike	Red Bull	CG Immobilien
2021–2022	Nike	Red Bull	CG Immobilien / Veganz ^{‡}
2022–2023	Nike	Red Bull	AOC Die Stadtentwickler / Veganz ^{‡}
2023–2024	Nike	Red Bull	AOC Die Stadtentwickler / IHG Hotels & Resorts ^{‡}
2024–present	Puma	Red Bull	AOC Die Stadtentwickler / IHG Hotels & Resorts ^{‡}

^{‡} In cup and UEFA matches

== Stadium ==
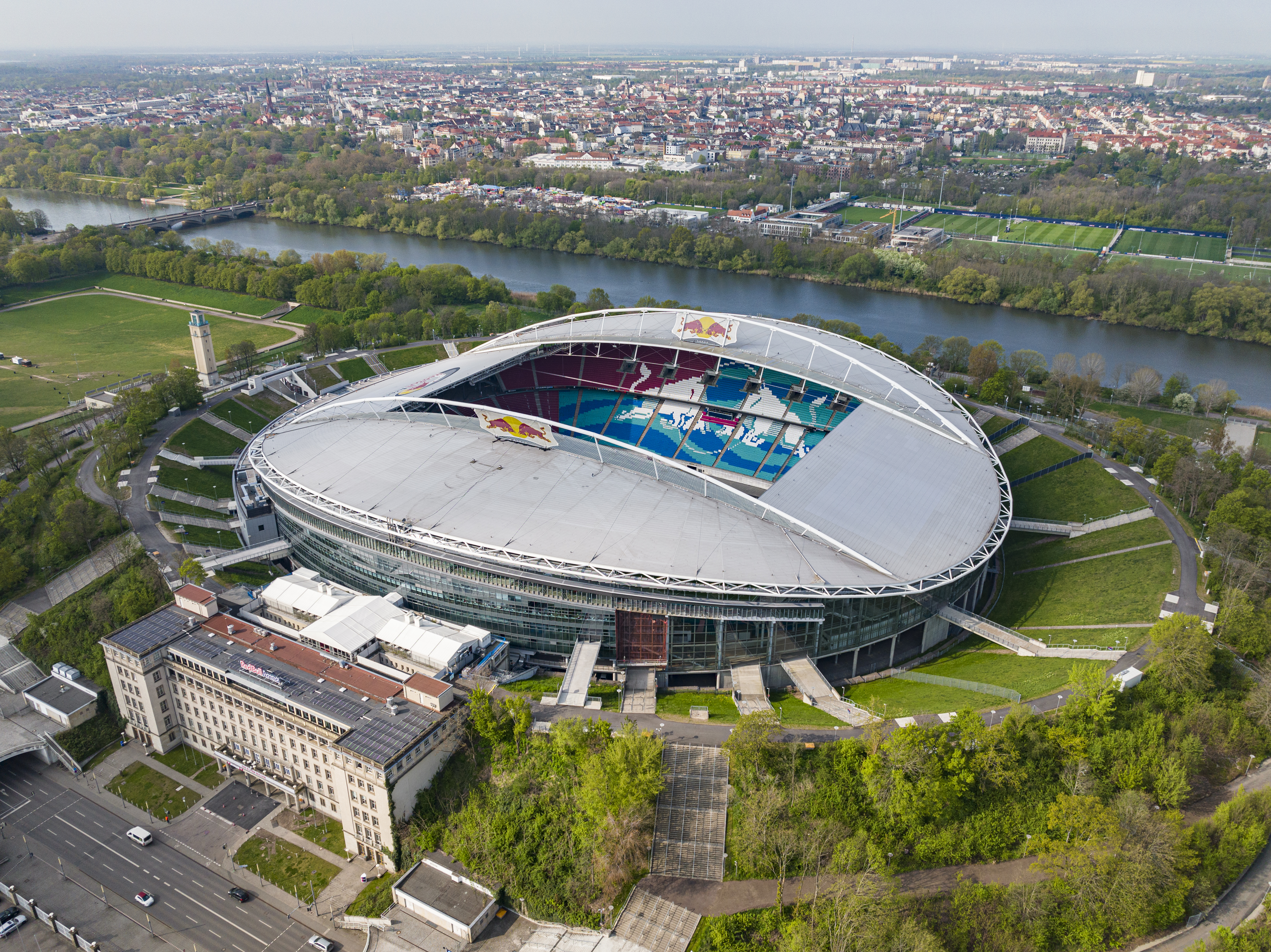
The Red Bull Arena

RB Leipzig played its inaugural season in 2009–10 at the Stadion am Bad in Markranstädt. The stadium held 5,000 seats and was the traditional home ground of SSV Markranstädt. But the plans were that the first team would quickly move to the far larger Zentralstadion, hopefully in 2010, after an advance to the Regionalliga. Red Bull GmbH reserved the naming right to the stadium at the club's founding, meaning that the name could not be sold to anyone else. The company negotiated the acquisition of the naming right during the successful 2009–10 season and the proposed new name was approved by the City of Leipzig on 25 March 2010. Red Bull GmbH then acquired the naming right and the Zentralstadion was renamed "Red Bull Arena" on 1 July 2010. The contract runs until 2040. The inauguration was held on 24 July 2010, in a friendly match against Schalke 04, in front of 21,566 spectators.

Red Bull Arena had a capacity of 44,345 seats during the 2014–15 season. In March 2015, RB Leipzig announced that it was going to invest 5 million euros in a redevelopment of the stadium, including an expansion of the VIP area, pressbox and wheelchair spaces. It also included two new larger LED score boards and refurbished player facilities. The VIP area was expanded from 700 seats to approximately 1400 seats. The capacity of Red Bull Arena was reduced to 42,959 seats before the 2015–16 season, due to redevelopment of various stadium areas.

The Red Bull Arena was an all-seater stadium for a long time. Home supporters are located in sector B. During the general meeting of the supporters' union in 2014, the assembly made a demand to convert sector B into a standing area. However, it was considered impossible to convert sector B into a standing area at the time, for structural reasons. Sector B was eventually converted into a standing area in the 2021–22 season.

=== Attendances ===
The 29 July 2011 first round 3–2 victory over VfL Wolfsburg was the club's first appearance in the 2011–12 DFB-Pokal; the 31,212 spectators gathered marked a club attendance record for the Red Bull Arena. The record did not stand long though; on 25 October 2011 Leipzig were defeated 1–0 by FC Augsburg, this second-round game of the DFB-Pokal set a new record attendance of 34,341 spectators.

The last home game of the 2013–14 3. Liga season on 3 May 2014 was a chance for RB Leipzig to secure direct promotion to the 2. Bundesliga; Leipzig romped home emphatically winning 5–1 against 1. FC Saarbrücken in a near-sell out capacity Red Bull Arena, in front of a record 42,713 spectators. The 43,348 spectators who watched the third round of the 2014–15 DFB-Pokal against VfL Wolfsburg on 4 March 2015, sold out the Red Bull Arena for the first time, setting the current club record for a match at the Red Bull Arena as of 2016.

RB Leipzig holds two attendance records. The 2011 Saxony Cup final against Chemnitzer FC on 1 June 2011 at the Red Bull Arena was attended by 13,958 spectators. The attendance set a new record for a Saxony Cup final. The record was broken two years later, again in a final between RB Leipzig and Chemnizer FC. The 2013 Saxony Cup final against Chemnitzer FC on 15 May 2013 at the Red Bull Arena was attended by 16,864 spectators. The second attendance record held by RB Leipzig was set during the 2012–13 season, in the qualification for the 3. Liga. The qualifying match against Sportfreunde Lotte on 29 May 2013 at the Red Bull Arena was attended by 30,104 spectators. The attendance set a new record for a match in the fourth tier of the German football league system.

RB Leipzig played its hundredth match at the Red Bull Arena on 4 October 2015, against 1. FC Nürnberg. At that point, the club reported a total attendance of 1,464,215 spectators, or an average of 14,643 spectators, for matches at the Red Bull Arena.

Their first Bundesliga home match was played on 10 September 2016 versus Borussia Dortmund in front of 42,558 spectators. In their debut season, the team averaged 41,454 spectators, or 97% of the stadium's capacity.

=== Average home league attendances ===
Season	Average attendance	Source
2009–10	2,150	
2010–11	4,206	
2011–12	7,401	
2012–13	7,563	
2013–14	16,734	
2014–15	25,025	
2015–16	29,441	
2016–17	41,454	
2017–18	39,397	
2018–19	38,380	
2019–20	28,819	
2020–21	1,059	
2021–22	22,124	
2022–23	45,559	
2023–24	45,175	
2024–25	45,045	
2025–26	44,146	

=== Expansion ===
In October 2014, German media reported that the club wanted to expand the Red Bull Arena to 55,000 seats for future first division Bundesliga play. An expansion to 55,000 seats would make the stadium one of the ten largest football venues in Germany. Who was to finance such an expansion remained unclear. German media considered that a possible option was that Red Bull GmbH buy the stadium to make the investments itself, but it was also considered unlikely that the current owner would be prepared to sell the stadium, which had just turned profitable.

The club had previously reserved an area near the A14 motorway north of Leipzig, close to the Leipzig/Halle Airport, which could be used to build a completely new stadium. It could also be used to put pressure on the current owner of the Red Bull Arena to agree to an expansion. In March 2015, German media reported the club considered building a new stadium on the area north of Leipzig. It could be modeled after the Veltins-Arena in Gelsenkirchen or the Esprit Arena in Düsseldorf, with a significantly larger capacity than Red Bull arena, possibly up to 80,000 seats.

The current owner of Red Bull Arena, Michael Kölmel, commented on plans to build a new stadium in an interview in August 2015. He pointed out how a new stadium on the outskirts of Leipzig could be detrimental to fan culture, and said that Red Bull Arena could be expanded to 55,000 seats, or even more.

In October 2015, expansion of the Red Bull Arena was back on the agenda. New plans were made to expand the stadium to 57,000 seats, involving Viennese architect Albert Wimmer. Reconstruction could start over the summer break of 2016. In January 2016, the club decided to put the plans on hold, at least until 2017.

In February 2016, German newspaper Leipziger Volkszeitung reported that club management again considered the possibility of building a new stadium with a capacity of 80,000 seats north of Leipzig. However, a prerequisite for such a project would be that ticket demand exceed the supply of seats in the Red Bull Arena significantly and sustainably. A move to a new stadium could be possible in 2020, when the club's current contract to lease the Red Bull Arena expires.

In December 2016, RB Leipzig offered that the stadium would be sold by former owner Michael Kölmel to the club to continue the plans from the 2015 agenda. Due to the transfer of the arena into ownership of Red Bull, a new stadium would not be pursued. It was planned, that the stadium would expand to a total of 53,840 seats as of summer 2021, beginning from November 2018, when construction works started. However, the plans were changed during construction and the expansion work was completed in 2021 with a total capacity of 47,069 spectators, of which 37,069 can be seated, at national competitions.

=== Training centre ===
In 2010, Red Bull announced its intention to engage long term in Leipzig. In this context the club sought a location for a training centre and a youth academy. Towards the end of the year, the club made concrete plans to invest 30 million euros in a training centre comprising six pitches, offices and a youth academy. The training center was to be located at Cottaweg, partly on the area of the naturally protected riparian forest Leipziger Auwald and the site of the traditional fair Leipziger Kleinmesse. The plans met objections and concerns from environmental organizations and from the current users of the area, a Leipzig fairground association and the football club BSV Schönau 1983. After negotiations, the City of Leipzig agreed to the plans on 15 December 2010. RB Leipzig and the city of Leipzig later announced that the club was going to invest in an area of 92,000 square meters.

The construction was to be carried out in two phases and began in March 2011. During the first phase, three natural turf pitches, one artificial turf pitch and an artificial hill for physical exercises were built. All four pitches were installed with floodlights, irrigation system and soil heating. Pitch one was also provided with four 38-meter masts producing HD-compatible lightning for optimal television broadcasts. Locker rooms, sanitary facilities and weight rooms were installed in 60 containers, totaling 720 square meters. The first section of the training center was opened in August 2011.

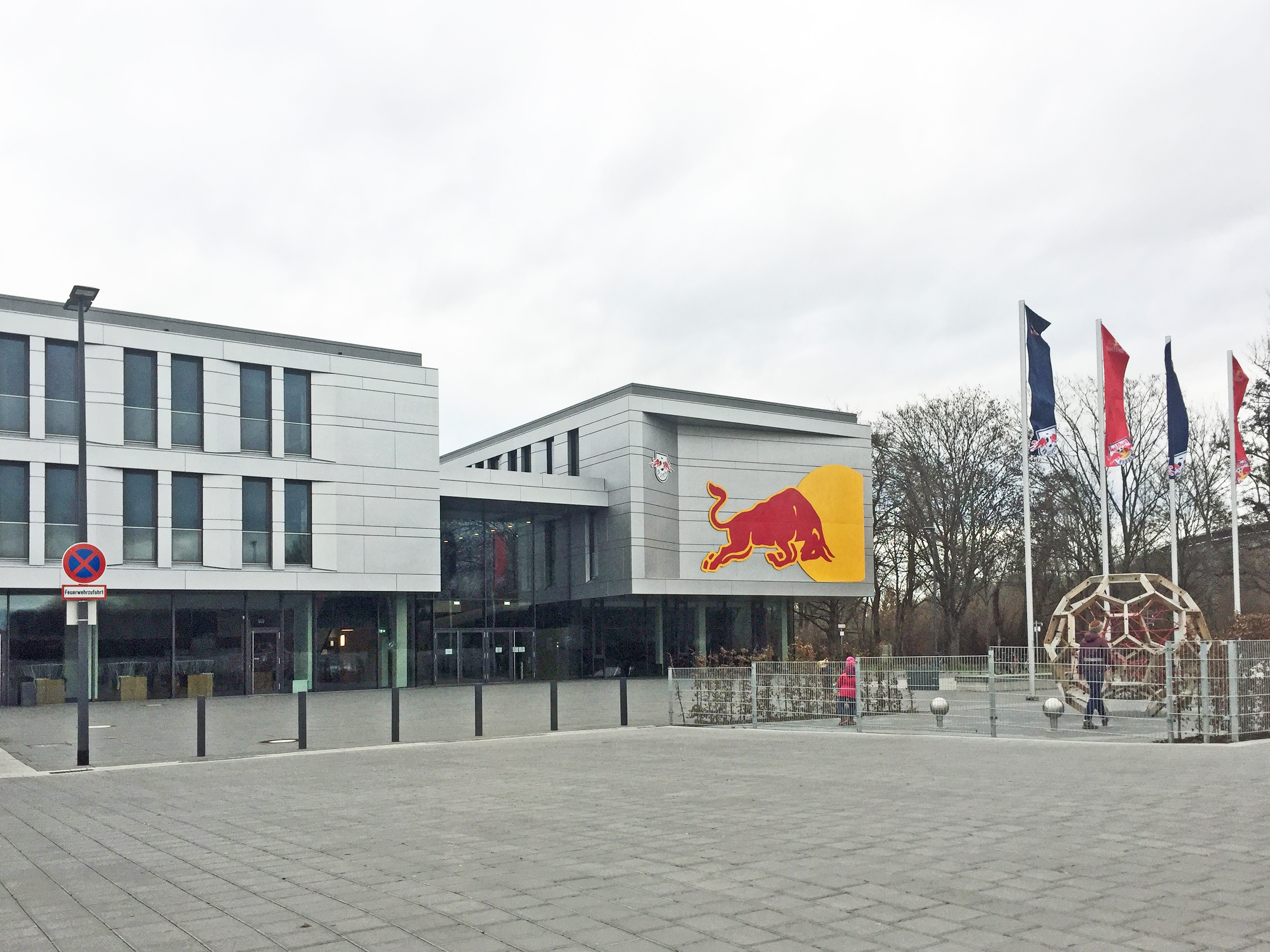
The RB Leipzig training center at Cottaweg

The second phase of construction began in January 2014. The plans for the second phase were set to create one of Germany's largest training centers for an estimated cost of 35 million euros. Involved in the project was the Dortmund-based architect Christoph Helbich, who had previously been involved in the building of a new training center for Borussia Dortmund. For the second phase, the training center was to be expanded with two pitches, an area for goalkeeping practices and a three-story 13,500 square meters sports complex, meant to offer amenities for all RB Leipzig teams, from the U8 team to the professional team. In addition, pitch one was to be provided with a covered grandstand with at least 1,000 seats, for A- and B-junior matches.

The sports complex was opened in September 2015 and is used by the professional team alongside six junior/youth academy teams, ranging from U14 to the reserve team. The facility includes an 800 square-meter indoor hall, an indoor tartan track for sprint training, weight rooms, cold chambers, a spa area, medical facilities, and individual relaxation rooms for first-team professional players. The complex also houses a media center, new offices, a boarding school for 50 youth players and a public café. At the time of its construction, the RB Leipzig training center with its sports complex was described by the media and journalists as one of the most modern facilities in Germany.

Constructed in the spring of 2016 was a covered grandstand with 1,000 seats, an area for motor skills-training and a parking area. The artificial hill for physical exercises, humorously called the "Felix Magath Memorial Hill", was also reconstructed.

The club has already plans for even further expansions of the training centre. The club wants to build an additional pitch to the south of the training centre. Such expansion would require more ground from the Leipziger Kleinmesse, and is therefore met with several objections. More certain is a future expansion to the north of the training center. This area is used by the football club BSV Schönau 1983 and the tennis club TC Grün-Weiß Leipzig. BSV Schönau 1983 has a contract to lease the area until 2026. The club ceded parts of its grounds to RB Leipzig in 2011. For this, the club received compensation. In total, RB Leipzig spent 900,000 euros for the construction of new grounds for BSC Schönau 1983. The area currently leased by BSV Schönau 1983 is already pledged to RB Leipzig when the lease contract ends in 2026.

At the end of 2025, new offices were built in the city's Cottaweg district for the staff to inhabit, improving from the staff needing to work far apart. The club is described as being hopeful for new beginnings with coaching changes throughout the youth ranks and new infrastructure.

== Supporters ==
=== Fanclubs and minor ultras ===
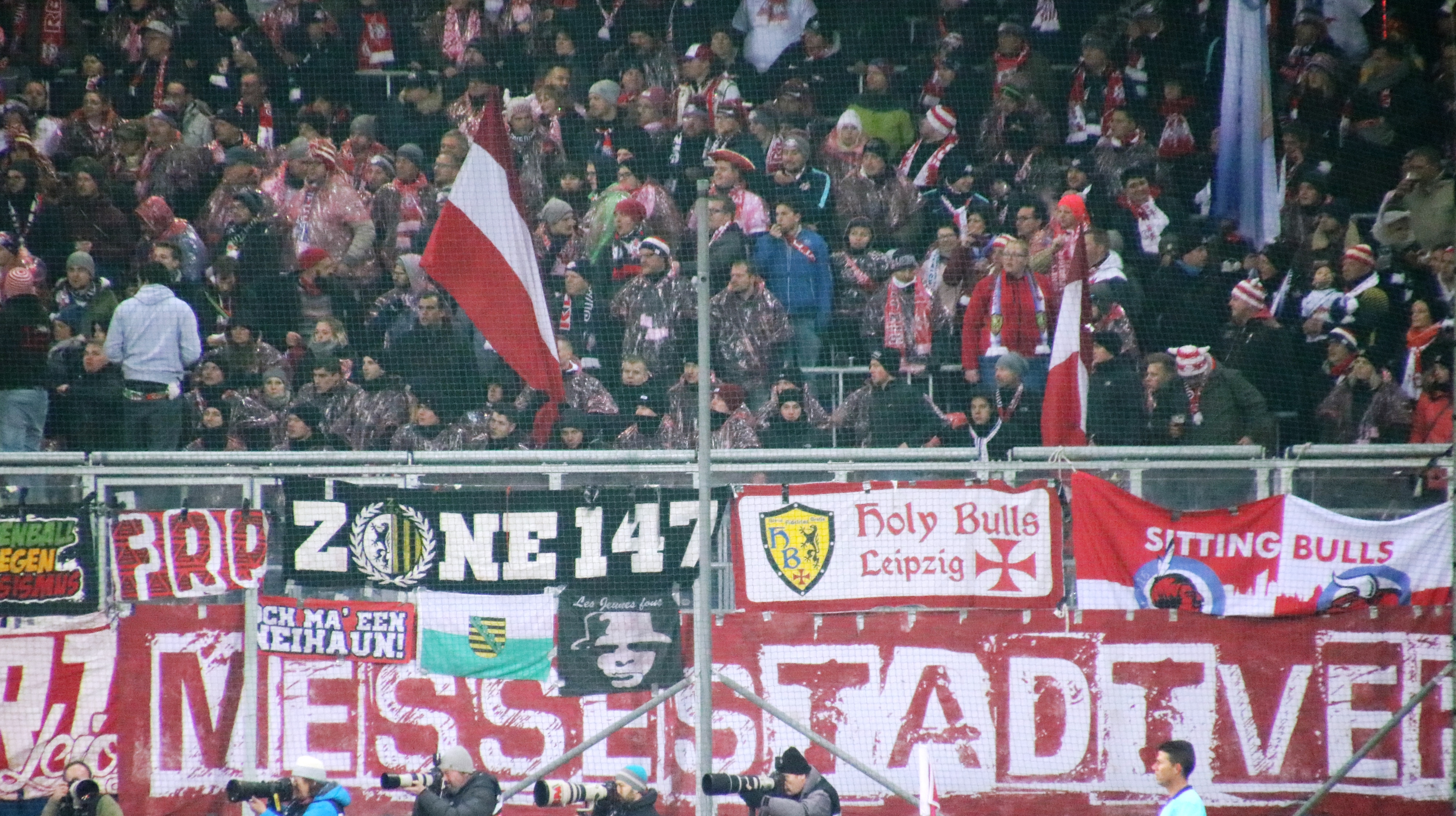
RB Leipzig supporters

RB Leipzig has 68 official fanclubs as of August 2023. The first two to become registered as official fanclubs were L.E Bulls and Bulls Club, both registered in 2009. L.E Bulls is the oldest official fan club, but Bulls Club claims to be the biggest. There are also several non-official fan clubs, such as Rasenballisten and Fraktion Red Pride. RB Leipzig also has a minor ultras scene, with groups such as Red Aces and Lecrats. The German newspaper Mitteldeutsche Zeitung reported that RB Leipzig had 5,000 organized supporters by March 2016.

Fan clubs and supporter groups are organized into a union called Fanverband RB Leipzig Fans, which was founded in 2013. This is an umbrella organization for official fan clubs, unofficial fan clubs and other groups. As of 2016, 25 supporter groups were organized in that union. Each group in the union is represented by two representatives. The representatives of the supporter groups meet every four to six weeks. The union also holds a general meeting once per year. Those who are not members of a supporter group are allowed to attend the general meeting. The union is represented by five to seven "fan representatives", elected every second year. A maximum of five "fan representatives" are elected by the representatives of the supporter groups, two additional "fan representatives" are elected by the general assembly. The "fan representatives" are permitted to speak with club officials to communicate ideas and criticism from the supporter base. In order to divide the work of the "fan representatives", the union has created several working groups. The first general meeting was held in November 2014, and gathered 350 supporters. Among those present were club officials, such as general manager Ulrich Wolter.

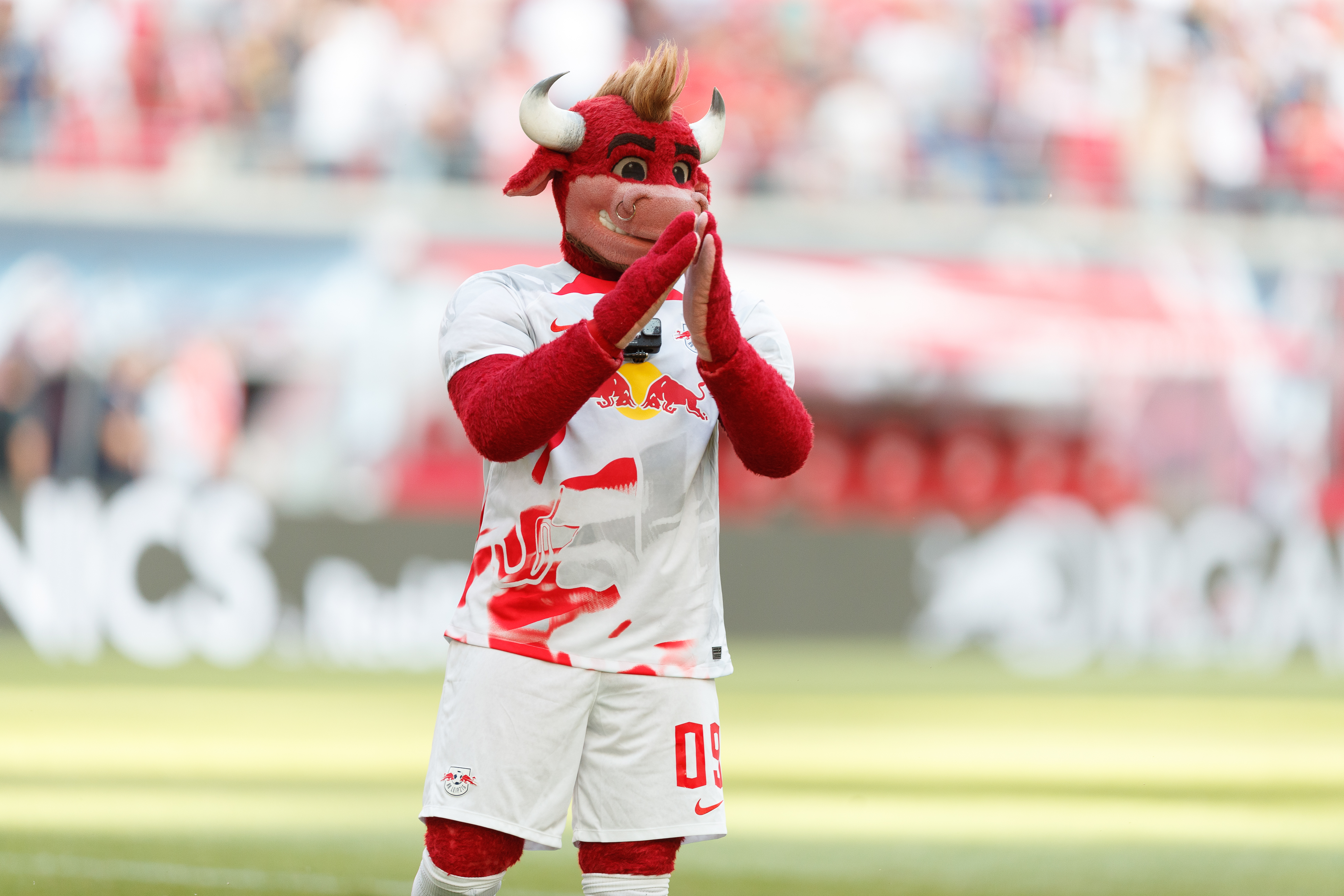
Bulli, the club mascot

Several German newspapers have noted the emergence of distinctly nonconformist supporter groups at the Red Bull Arena. In January 2012, Leipziger Internet Zeitung reported on the appearance of ultra group Red Aces. The group members were said to see themselves as "Rasenballisten" and determined not to leave the supporter base solely to Red Bull GmbH. In May 2014, Der Tagesspiegel reported on supporter group IG Rasenballisten. The group was said to highly value the name "RasenBallsport" and to be committed to give the club an identity beyond that offered by Red Bull GmbH, and instead centered the city of Leipzig. In April 2015, Die Zeit reported further on this subject, particularly supporter groups IG Rasenballisten and Lecrats. Their central idea was described as "Rasenballismus", stressing the Leipzig identity and the importance of impassioned fans. Lecrats was described as geared towards the anti-commercial values of ultra culture and as critics of Red Bull GmbH. IG Rasenballisten and the ultra groups were said to consciously avoid the reductions that apply to official fanclubs and to reject official club merchandise and the commercial name of the stadium. In February 2015, the supporter group IG Rasenballisten became a registered voluntary association. The group had previously functioned as an interest community for other groups and individuals in the Red Bull Arena. The Mitteldeutsche Zeitung reported that the group describes itself as uniting fanatical and critical fans of RB Leipzig. Members of Rasenballisten said that the group does not hesitate to criticize Red Bull GmbH, when found necessary, and stated that the identity of a club cannot solely rely on the main sponsor. The group also makes a clear political statement: "Together for Leipzig – Rasenball against Racism", a statement which can be found on scarves sold by the group, and on a banner inside the stadium. RB Leipzig had previously refused to allow supporter groups such as Rasenballisten to sell their own merchandise at the stadium, but after lengthy negotiations, the club gave permission.

The ultra group Red Aces took position against Legida, the local offshoot of the far-right group Pegida. In January 2015, the Red Aces penned an open letter to the club, the stadium operator, the Mayor of Leipzig and the citizens of Leipzig asking for support against a planned demonstration by Legida. The demonstration was set to begin near the Red Bull Arena, and the group specifically asked for the stadium lights to be switched off at the time of the demonstration. The stadium operator decided to support the initiative and agreed to switch off the lighting. Red Aces had also previously asked the club for permission to display banners against racism and Legida during the last home game of 2014. The club refused to approve the requested banners — according to Red Aces, the club did not want politics in the stadium. Despite the ban, the group displayed a banner directed towards Legida, describing the city of Leipzig as diverse, cosmopolitan and tolerant. In response to the demonstrations by Legida, the anti-racist action group Rasenball gegen Rassismus was founded by RB Leipzig's supporter groups Red Aces, Lecrats, Rabauken – Block 31, and IG Rasenballisten in January 2015. Before the home match against SpVgg Greuther Fürth on 3 August 2015, Red Aces again asked for permission to display a banner against Legida, with the text Ligaspiel und Legida – der Montag ist zum Kotzen da. The club again refused to approve the requested banner. During the home match against FC St. Pauli on 23 August 2015, Red Aces defied the supposed ban on anti-racist banners in the stadium through displaying a banner with a clear anti-Nazi message. Sporting director Ralf Rangnick later said that there was no ban against anti-racist messages in the stadium, stating that the banner was prohibited before the home match against SpVgg Greuther Fürth because it contained abusive language, and that the club would agree if someone wanted to display a banner with a message such as "RBL Fans against Racism".

=== Fans at away sides ===
RB Leipzig supporters travelled in numbers to the first away match of 2016, against FC St. Pauli on 12 February 2016. Nearly 2,500 RB Leipzig supporters made their way to the Millerntorstadion and displayed a red and white flag tifo at the match start. A higher number of RB Leipzig supporters accompanied the team to Nuremberg one month later. The away match against 1. FC Nürnberg on 20 March 2016 at the Grundig-Stadion was attended by 2,800 RB Leipzig supporters, according to club statistics. The number set a new club record for away supporters, which was broken in the first two Bundesliga seasons. More than 7,000 supporters attended away matches in Dortmund, Munich and Berlin, with a one-year record at the away match in Berlin, when 8,500 supporters of RBL gathered to watch their team qualify for the UEFA Champions League. One year later, more than 9,000 fans travelled for the last away game of the 2017–18 season in Berlin.

=== Fanprojekt Leipzig ===
The organization Fanprojekt Leipzig was founded in 2011 by initiative of the city of Leipzig and is run by Outlaw gGmbH, full name Outlaw gemeinnützige Gesellschaft für Kinder- und Jugendhilfe mbH. Outlaw gGmbH is a Münster-based non-profit company for child and youth welfare. The basic framework of the Fanprojekt Leipzig was concluded by the City of Leipzig, the Free State of Saxony and the German Football Association (DFB), and the organization receives funding from the City of Leipzig and the DFB.

Fanprojekt Leipzig is an organization for young football fans of different clubs in Leipzig, and works as an independent institution towards the different clubs. The main areas for the organization are promoting a positive supporter culture, violence prevention, help for young supporters in problem situations and establishing communication between all parties involved, such as supporters, clubs, police and law enforcement. Fanprojekt Leipzig is part of a network of similar Fanprojekts in numerous German cities. The different Fanprojekts are supported by a national coordination office (KOS).

Fanprojekt Leipzig runs a number of centers in Leipzig used for purposes such as recreational activities, content projects, painting and creation of minor choreographies, and as meeting places. For each club, the organization offers a social worker or pedagogue who works exclusively with supporters of that club. The organization carries out a variety of recreational and educational activities, including sporting activities, creative projects, readings and discussions and educational programs. The organization has presence during match days, where it is available for personal contact by supporters, police and law enforcement, with the aim to be able to mediate between the parties and have a de-escalating effect.

RB Leipzig entered a cooperation agreement with Fanprojekt Leipzig in 2013. The cooperation agreement involves collaboration in eight categories, involving both home and away matches, as well as anti-racism work. The detailed cooperation agreement was by then a novelty in Germany. In addition, the RB Leipzig formed a stadium ban commission, in which Fanprojekt Leipzig provides advice to the club. Fanprojekt Leipzig has also arranged a number of events, in which supporters can discuss the development of the supporter scene, and whose results are presented for the club.

== Organization and finance ==
=== Association ===
RasenballSport Leipzig e.V is a registered voluntary association. Its executive body is the Vorstand, the management board. The management board is appointed by the Ehrenrat, the honorary board. It is also subordinated to the Aufsichtsrat, the supervisory board. The honorary board is elected directly by club members at the general meeting.

Significant organizational changes were made in 2014, following requirements set up by the German Football League (DFL). One of the requirements was to change the composition of organizational bodies. Both the management board and the honorary board had been composed by either employees or agents of Red Bull. This effectively contradicted fundamental principles of the 50+1 rule, as interpreted by the DFL, and which aims to forbid the influence of third parties on the sporting decisions of a club. As a part of a compromise with the DFL, the club made a binding declaration that it said was intended to ensure that the management board would be occupied by a majority of persons independent of Red Bull.

In addition, a supervisory board was added. The honorary board had performed tasks normally performed by a separate controlling organizational body. These functions were now transferred to a newly created supervisory board, capable of performing these tasks independently. The club decided to transfer the former members of the honorary board to the newly created supervisory board.

The association is responsible for men's junior teams from U8 to U14 and all women's football teams.

==== Membership ====
Voting membership is severely restricted. In contrast to all other association football clubs in Germany, there is no official way to become a voting member of RasenballSport Leipzig e.V. According to Ulrich Wolter, the club does not aspire towards the high number of members of other clubs. Wolter has also pointed at other clubs, where Ultras have succeeded in creating structures, and stated that the club absolutely wants to avoid such conditions.

For the establishment of a registered voluntary association, an association is required by German law to have at least seven members. Four years after its founding, the club had only nine members, all employees of Red Bull. By 2014, the registration fee for membership stood at 100 euros and the annual membership fee at 800 euros, in comparison to Bayern Munich who, by that time, offered membership at annual fees between 30 and 60 euros. In addition to this, a person willing to pay the fee could not expect to become a member, since the management board could reject an application without notice.

This restrictive membership policy met criticism, thus one of the original requirements set up by the DFL in order to obtain a license for the 2014–15 2. Bundesliga season was to lower the membership fees and open up the association for new members. The club, in response to this pressure from the DFL, announced changes to the membership in June 2014. It then became possible for a person to become an "official supporting member". The annual fee for this type of membership is between 70 and 1000 euros and serves to promote junior football within the club. In return, a "supporting member" receives certain privileges, such as a meeting with the professional team and a fitness session at the Red Bull Arena. "Supporting members" also have the right to attend general meetings, although without voting rights. In order to improve participation in the association, "supporting members" are represented by one member in the supervisory board.

=== GmbH ===
On 2 December 2014, the general meeting of the association voted unanimously for the founding of a spin-off organization in the form of a GmbH. The decision was taken at an extraordinary meeting. Present were 14 voting members and 40 "supporting members". Chairman Oliver Mintzlaff stated that the change was made for the club to be able to step up professionally and to remain competitive. The RasenballSport Leipzig GmbH is responsible for the professional team, the reserve team and men's junior teams from U15 and above.

As of 2015, Red Bull GmbH is the main shareholder of RasenballSport Leipzig GmbH, holding 99 percent of the shares. The remaining one percent is held by the association. However, as required by the 50 + 1 rule, formal power lies with the association, which holds the majority of votes.

As of April 2016, the general manager of RasenballSport Leipzig GmbH was Oliver Mintzlaff.

=== Sponsorship ===
RB Leipzig's kits were first provided by German sportswear brand Adidas from the club's founding. In 2014, the club switched to the American sportswear brand Nike, in an agreement that was expected to be in place until at least 2025. In October 2014, the club also entered into promotional agreements with Hugo Boss, Porsche as youth sponsor, and Volkswagen for stadium commercials. On 20 May 2016, RB Leipzig extended its contract with Krostitzer Brauerei to be its official beer partner until 2018.

=== Joint donation, with Dortmund, Bayern and Leverkusen ===
In March 2020, RB Leipzig, Borussia Dortmund, Bayern Munich and Bayer Leverkusen, the four German UEFA Champions League teams for the 2019–20 season, collectively gave €20 million to Bundesliga and 2. Bundesliga teams that were struggling financially during the COVID-19 pandemic.

== Players ==
=== Current squad ===
As of 7 September 2026

Note: Flags indicate national team as defined under FIFA eligibility rules; some limited exceptions apply. Players may hold more than one non-FIFA nationality.

No.	Pos.	Nation	Player
1	GK	NOR	Ørjan Nyland
2	DF	FRA	Abdoul Koné
3	DF	FRA	Maxime Estève
4	DF	HUN	Willi Orbán
6	MF	COD	Ezechiel Banzuzi
7	FW	NOR	Antonio Nusa
8	MF	GER	Assan Ouédraogo
9	FW	ESP	Marc Guiu
10	MF	GER	Brajan Gruda (on loan from Brighton & Hove Albion)
11	FW	BEL	Johan Bakayoko
13	MF	AUT	Nicolas Seiwald
14	MF	AUT	Christoph Baumgartner
16	DF	GER	Lukas Klostermann
17	DF	GER	Ridle Baku
20	MF	GER	Rocco Reitz (vice-captain)

No.	Pos.	Nation	Player
21	MF	MAR	Neil El Aynaoui (on loan from Roma)
22	DF	GER	David Raum (captain)
23	DF	FRA	Castello Lukeba
25	GK	GER	Leopold Zingerle
26	GK	BEL	Maarten Vandevoordt
27	FW	FRA	Tidiam Gomis
28	FW	FRA	Christopher Nkunku (on loan from AC Milan)
30	MF	SRB	Andrija Maksimović
35	DF	GER	Max Finkgräfe
37	MF	GER	Benno Kaltefleiter
39	DF	GER	Benjamin Henrichs
40	FW	BRA	Rômulo
45	FW	FRA	Samba Konaté
47	MF	GER	Viggo Gebel

=== Out on loan ===
Note: Flags indicate national team as defined under FIFA eligibility rules; some limited exceptions apply. Players may hold more than one non-FIFA nationality.

No.	Pos.	Nation	Player
—	GK	GER	Timo Schlieck (at SC Verl until 30 June 2027)
—	DF	FRA	El Chadaille Bitshiabu (at Galatasaray until 30 June 2027)
—	DF	NED	Lutsharel Geertruida (at PSV until 30 June 2027)
—	DF	BEL	Joyeux Masanka Bungi (at VfB Stuttgart II until 30 June 2027)

No.	Pos.	Nation	Player
—	MF	MKD	Eljif Elmas (at Atalanta until 30 June 2027)
—	MF	BEL	Arthur Vermeeren (at Royal Antwerp until 30 June 2027)
—	FW	DEN	Conrad Harder (at Strasbourg until 30 June 2027)
—	FW	JPN	Ota Yamamoto (at Omiya Ardija until 30 June 2027)

== Notable players ==
=== Most appearances ===
Statistics correct as of 16 May 2026.

- The ten players with the most appearances are listed.
- Appearances include matches in all competitions.
- Appearances include substitute appearances.
- Players marked in **bold** are still playing for the club.

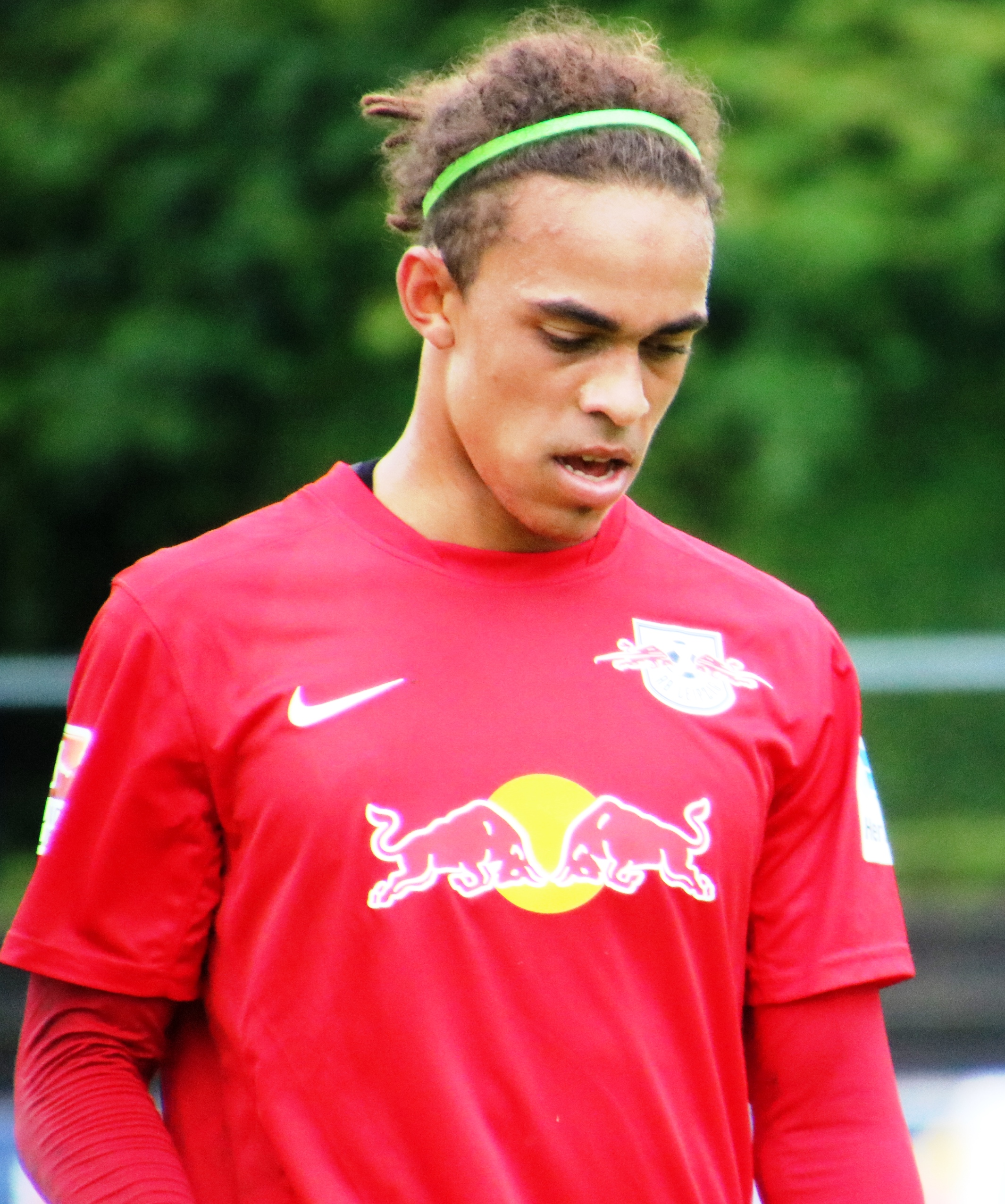
Yussuf Poulsen is RB Leipzig's most capped player.

Most appearances
Rank	Player	Nationality	Position	Tenure	Apps
1	Yussuf Poulsen	Denmark	Forward	2013–2025	425
2	**Willi Orbán**	Hungary	Defender	2015–	385
3	Péter Gulácsi	Hungary	Goalkeeper	2015–2026	362
4	**Lukas Klostermann**	Germany	Defender	2014–	333
5	Emil Forsberg	Sweden	Midfielder	2015–2023	325
6	Kevin Kampl	Slovenia	Midfielder	2017–2026	283
7	Marcel Halstenberg	Germany	Defender	2015–2023	240
8	Marcel Sabitzer	Austria	Forward	2014–2021	229
9	Amadou Haidara	Mali	Midfielder	2019–2025	222
10	Timo Werner	Germany	Forward	2016–2020; 2022–2026	216

=== Top goalscorers ===
Statistics correct as of 9 May 2026.

- The ten players with the most goals are listed.
- Players marked in **bold** are still playing for the club.

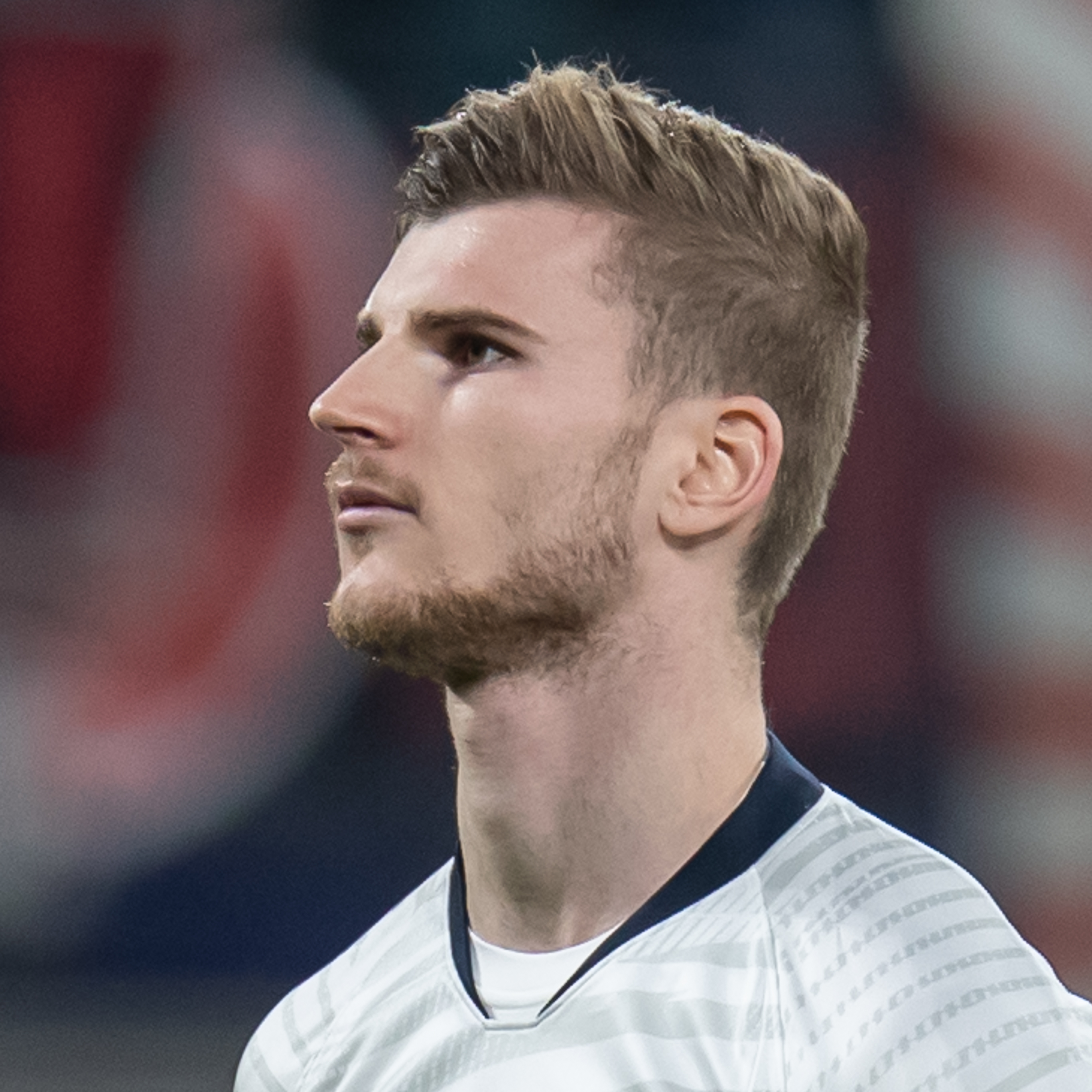
Timo Werner is RB Leipzig's top goalscorer.

Most goals
Rank	Player	Nationality	Position	Tenure	Goals
1	Timo Werner	Germany	Forward	2016–2020; 2022–2026	113
2	Yussuf Poulsen	Denmark	Forward	2013–2025	95
3	Daniel Frahn	Germany	Forward	2010–2015	88
4	Emil Forsberg	Sweden	Midfielder	2015–2023	71
5	**Christopher Nkunku**	France	Forward	2019–2023; 2026–	70
6	Marcel Sabitzer	Austria	Midfielder	2014–2021	52
7	Loïs Openda	Belgium	Forward	2023–2026	41
8	Benjamin Šeško	Slovenia	Forward	2023–2025	39
9	**Willi Orbán**	Hungary	Defender	2015–	36
10	Dominik Kaiser	Germany	Midfielder	2012–2018	34

=== Captains ===
- Players marked in **bold** are still playing for the club.

Captain	Nationality	Years	Notes
Ingo Hertzsch	Germany	2009–2010	
Tim Sebastian	Germany	2010–2011	
Daniel Frahn	Germany	2011–2015	
Dominik Kaiser	Germany	2015–2017	
**Willi Orbán**	Hungary	2017–2020, 2023–2025	
Marcel Sabitzer	Austria	2020–2021	
Péter Gulácsi	Hungary	2021–2023	
**David Raum**	Germany	2025–	

== Staff ==
=== Current staff ===
As of 22 June 2026

Position	Name
Head coach	(Argentina) Martín Demichelis
Assistant coaches	(Germany) Cristian Fiél (Germany) Jan Zimmermann (Argentina) Mariano Cambursano (Germany) Stefan Buck
Goalkeeping coach	(Germany) Frederik Gößling
Match analysts	(Germany) Matthias Grote (Germany) Johannes von Holwede (Germany) Dirk Folkerts
Athletic coaches	(Germany) Daniel Behlau (Austria) Patrick Eibenberger (Germany) Ruwen Faller
Managing director for sport	(Germany) Marcel Schäfer
Sporting director	(Germany) Sebastian Schuppan
Sports coordinator	(Germany) Daniel Baier
First-team coordinator	(Germany) Silvio Arendt
Head of the medical department	(Germany) Niklas Hennecke
Team doctor	(Germany) Dr. Frank Striegler
Mental performance coach	(Greece) Efthimios Kompodietas
Head physiotherapist	(Germany) Nikolaus Schmid
Physiotherapists	(Germany) Alexander Blase (Germany) Christopher Weichert (Germany) Christopher Ballhausen
Rehabilitation coach	(Germany) Marcel Abanoz
Physical performance & rehabilitation coach	(Germany) Robert Friedrich
Performance diagnostic coach	(Germany) Dominik Cegla
Nutritionist	(Germany) Pia Malin Jensen
Performance coach	(Germany) Julia Woellner
Head of team management & organisation	(Germany) Franziska Pietschmann
Team manager	(Senegal) Babacar N'Diaye
Team manager & integration officer	(Germany) David Schmiedhold
Integration officer	(Austria) Valentina Klocker
Equipment manager & bus driver	(Germany) Claudia Richter
Equipment manager	(Germany) Mike Richter
Laundry	(Germany) Uwe Metzdorff
Bus driver	(Germany) Roland Hahn

=== Coach history ===
No.	Head coach	Nationality	From	Until	Days	Notes
1	Tino Vogel	Germany	1 July 2009	30 June 2010	364	
2	Tomas Oral	Germany	1 July 2010	30 June 2011	364	
3	Peter Pacult	Austria	1 July 2011	30 June 2012	365	
4	Alexander Zorniger	Germany	1 July 2012	11 February 2015	954	
5	Achim Beierlorzer	Germany	11 February 2015	30 June 2015	139	^{Note 1}
6	Ralf Rangnick	Germany	1 July 2015	30 June 2016	365	
7	Ralph Hasenhüttl	Austria	1 July 2016	16 May 2018	684	
8	Ralf Rangnick	Germany	9 July 2018	30 June 2019	356	
9	Julian Nagelsmann	Germany	1 July 2019	30 June 2021	730	
10	Jesse Marsch	United States	1 July 2021	5 December 2021	157	
11	Achim Beierlorzer	Germany	5 December 2021	9 December 2021	4	^{Note 1}
12	Domenico Tedesco	Germany	9 December 2021	7 September 2022	272	
13	Marco Rose	Germany	8 September 2022	30 March 2025	934	
14	Zsolt Lőw	Hungary	30 March 2025	30 June 2025	92	^{Note 1}
15	Ole Werner	Germany	1 July 2025	17 June 2026	351	
16	Martín Demichelis	Argentina	22 June 2026		150	

Notes

1. Interim coach.

== Season history ==
Season	League	Pos	W	D	L	GF	GA	Pts	DFB-Pokal
2021–22	Bundesliga	4th	17	7	10	72	37	58	Winners
2022–23	Bundesliga	3rd	20	6	8	64	41	66	Winners
2023–24	Bundesliga	4th	19	8	7	77	39	65	Second round
2024–25	Bundesliga	7th	13	12	9	53	48	51	Semi-finals
2025–26	Bundesliga	3rd	20	5	9	66	47	65	Quarter-finals
Green marks a season followed by promotion

=== European competitions ===
==== Overview ====
Having finished as runners-up in their debut season in the German top flight, RB Leipzig gained entry to continental football for the first time, specifically the 2017–18 UEFA Champions League. RB Leipzig is one of the first clubs to qualify for the Champions League so soon (eight years) after its creation. The campaign also saw Red Bull Salzburg qualify as Austrian champions; this raised the issue of a possible conflict of interest between the clubs due to the level of influence exerted by Red Bull over both teams and the close sporting relationship between them in various aspects. After examining the operational structures during June 2017, UEFA declared themselves satisfied under their regulations that the two clubs (particularly Salzburg) were suitably independent from the Red Bull corporation, and sufficiently distinct from one another, for both be admitted to their competitions.

In the first season following that ruling, both reached the quarter-finals of the 2017–18 UEFA Europa League but did not play each other, with RB Leipzig eliminated by Marseille, who then also knocked out Salzburg in the semi-finals. However, in the next edition of the same competition, RB Leipzig and Red Bull Salzburg were drawn together in Group B to meet competitively for the first time. Salzburg won both fixtures between the clubs (3–2 in Germany, 1–0 in Austria), and also won all their other matches to top the group, while Leipzig failed to progress after dropping further points against Celtic and Rosenborg.

==== UEFA club coefficient ranking ====
As of 1 May 2026

Rank	Team	Points
35	(Netherlands) AZ	62.875
36	(Greece) Olympiacos	62.250
37	(Germany) RB Leipzig	61.000
38	(Scotland) Rangers	59.250
39	(Spain) Villarreal	59.000

== RB Leipzig affiliated teams ==
RB Leipzig has several affiliated teams, including a women's team, and junior and academy teams.

=== Relationship with Red Bull Salzburg ===
In 2005, Red Bull bought a club in Salzburg, Austria and renamed them Red Bull Salzburg (so named to circumvent local rules on corporate naming) with the aim of establishing a leading branded team in that country in a similar mould to its existing franchises in Salzburg and other locations. Over the next decade, Leipzig became the owners' main football project, and the close relationship between the teams was exemplified by the number of players moving between them (Georg Teigl, Marcel Sabitzer, Yordy Reyna, and Stefan Ilsanker all transferred from Salzburg to Leipzig) with some of the Austrian fans becoming increasingly annoyed at their best players being signed by the 'step-sibling' club in their mission to climb through the levels of German football. There are also links between their youth systems and scouting networks.

Having finished as runners-up in their debut season in the German top flight, RB Leipzig gained entry to continental football for the first time, specifically the 2017–18 UEFA Champions League for which Red Bull Salzburg had also qualified as Austrian champions; this raised the issue of a possible conflict of interest between the clubs due to the level of influence exerted by Red Bull over both teams and the close sporting relationship between them in various aspects. After examining the operational structures during June 2017, UEFA declared themselves satisfied under their regulations that the two clubs (particularly Salzburg) were suitably independent from the Red Bull corporation, and sufficiently distinct from one another, for both to be admitted to their competitions. In the first season following that ruling, both reached the quarter-finals of the 2017–18 UEFA Europa League but did not play each other, with RB Leipzig eliminated by Marseille, who then also knocked out Salzburg in the semi-finals. However, in the next edition of the same competition, RB Leipzig and Red Bull Salzburg were drawn together in Group B to meet competitively for the first time. Salzburg were the victors in both fixtures between the clubs (3–2 in Germany, 1–0 in Austria) and also won all their other matches to top the group, while Leipzig failed to progress after dropping further points against Celtic and Rosenborg. In December 2020, Dominik Szoboszlai poised to become the second RB Salzburg player to move to RB Leipzig in space of six months, after Hwang Hee-chan completed the switch in summer. In 2023, they completed deals of both Nicolas Seiwald (€20,000,000) and Benjamin Šeško (€24,000,000) from Salzburg for a total of €54,000,000.

== Honours ==
=== Domestic ===
==== League ====
- Bundesliga
  - Runners-up: 2016–17, 2020–21
- 2. Bundesliga (II)
  - Runners-up: 2015–16
- 3. Liga (III)
  - Runners-up: 2013–14
- Regionalliga Nordost (IV)
  - Winners: 2012–13
- NOFV-Oberliga Süd (V)
  - Winners: 2009–10

==== Cup ====
- DFB-Pokal
  - Winners: 2021–22, 2022–23
  - Runners-up: 2018–19, 2020–21
- DFL-Supercup
  - Winners: 2023
  - Runners-up: 2022
- Saxony Cup
  - Winners: 2010–11, 2012–13

== Affiliated clubs ==
The following clubs are currently affiliated with RB Leipzig:

- (Austria) Red Bull Salzburg (2009–present)
- (United States) New York Red Bulls (2009–present)
- (Brazil) Red Bull Brasil (2009–2024)
- (Brazil) Red Bull Bragantino (2020–present)
- (India) Goa (2020–2023)
- (Japan) Omiya Ardija (2024–present)

The following clubs were affiliated with RB Leipzig in the past:

- (Germany) SSV Markranstädt (2009–2010)
- Red Bull Ghana (2009–2014)
- (Germany) ESV Delitzsch (2010–2011)

== Criticism ==
The establishment of RB Leipzig has led to much criticism in Germany, particularly regarding the involvement of Red Bull GmbH and its restrictive membership policy. This has been seen by German football fans as contrary to common practice in the country, where clubs have traditionally relied on voluntary registered associations, with sometimes a very large number of members, and where the 50 + 1 rule has ensured that club members have a formal controlling stake. RB Leipzig has received criticism relating to perceptions that it was founded as a marketing tool and that it increased the commercialization of football in Germany. The club has been rejected as a "marketing club", a "commercial club" or a "plastic club". This criticism has been widespread, and includes people in the management and among coaches and supporters of other clubs.

Supporters of other Leipzig football clubs, such as Lokomotive Leipzig and Sachsen Leipzig, protested against the creation of RB Leipzig. They feared a decline of traditional fan culture in Leipzig, and a commercialization of football in the region. After the partnership with SSV Markranstädt became known, protests immediately appeared in Leipzig suburbs. Red Bull advertising boards at the Stadion am Bad in Markranstädt were smeared with graffiti and a weed killer placed on the pitch to purposely ruin it. Protests in Leipzig were generally non-violent. Despite RB Leipzig playing its inaugural season in 2009–10 in the same league as Lokomotive Leipzig and Sachsen Leipzig, criticism from these clubs was moderate. Lokomotive Leipzig chairman Steffen Kubald, nevertheless, said that the match against RB Leipzig would for each team be the match of the season, and referred to RB Leipzig as the "Bayern Munich of the Oberliga" (fifth tier of German football).

The German economist Dr. Tobias Kollman said in 2009 that he saw Red Bull GmbH as a company with clear economic goals for its projects. Consequently, he described RB Leipzig as a "marketing club" and said that it was the first of this kind in Germany. He described the activities of Red Bull GmbH in Leipzig as a "sports political earthquake" in Germany. Borussia Dortmund chairman Hans-Joachim Watzke and Eintracht Frankfurt chairman Heribet Bruchhagen, speaking in 2013 of a "clash of culture", warned that clubs backed by major companies or financially strong patrons could pose a threat to the entire Bundesliga. They said that such clubs would set traditional clubs backwards, and warned that RB Leipzig would be responsible for pushing a traditional club out of the Bundesliga. Hans-Joachim Watzke, speaking in 2014, characterized RB Leipzig's activities and the way it behaved as "morally questionable", referring to its transfer policy in close cooperation with Red Bull Salzburg, using its signing of Marcel Sabitzer as an example. Hans-Joachim Watzke said he was not an opponent of RB Leipzig, that appreciated the idea of a Bundesliga club from Saxony, and that the club was welcome for as long as the German Football Association (DFB) ensured that RB Leipzig complied with the "democratic rules of football" and the club finances its own operations. A fiercer critic, Peter Neururer, head coach of VfL Bochum, said in 2014 that RB Leipzig "made him sick" and that he considered the club to be built on purely economical interests. He further stated that competing with RB Leipzig was not a fair deal, because the club could sign the players it wanted, and that such competition "had nothing to do with the sport that we love".

Supporter groups from across Germany have protested against RB Leipzig and Red Bull GmbH. Supporters of traditional clubs have seen RB Leipzig as a symbol of defeat for tradition and victory for money, and have rejected RB Leipzig as a "plastic club". They have protested against the commercialization of football, Red Bull GmbH's involvement and the allegedly undemocratic structures at RB Leipzig.

After RB Leipzig gained promotion to 2. Bundesliga in 2014, supporter groups from ten clubs in the 2. Bundesliga created a campaign against the club, called "Nein zu RB" ("No to RB"). Since then, numerous groups across Germany have joined the campaign. In March 2015, the campaign web page indicated a number of 182 supporter groups from 29 clubs.

RB Leipzig has also seen protests against it at away matches. During the away match against Union Berlin on 21 September 2014, the home supporters symbolically wore black plastic ponchos and were silent for the first 15 minutes of the match. A large banner displayed by home supporters said: "In Leipzig, the football culture is dying". Another banner displayed said: "Football needs workers' participation, loyalty, standing terraces, emotion, financial fair play, tradition, transparency, passion, history, independence". The producers of Union's matchday program devised a more humorous protest for RB Leipzig's August 2015 visit, replacing the page that would normally be dedicated to the visiting team with an article on the history of bull farming. At an away match against FC Erzgebirge Aue on 6 February 2015, the home supporters displayed banners which compared Dietrich Mateschitz to Adolf Hitler, and supporters of RB Leipzig to blind Nazi followers. FC Erzgebirge Aue was later fined 35,000 euros by the DFB for the banners. At an away match against 1. FC Heidenheim on 18 September 2015, the player bus was approached upon the arrival at the stadium by supporters of 1. FC Heidenheim who pelted the bus with hundreds of counterfeit dollar bills printed with a caricature of Dietrich Mateschitz depicted with a large hooked nose and the text "Scheiß Red Bull" ("Shitty Red Bull") and "In Capitalism he trusts". The action later led to a police investigation, for a possibly dangerous interference with traffic safety and for the imprint.

During the home match against Hansa Rostock on 23 November 2013, the away supporters protested by being entirely absent for the first seven minutes of the match and then filled the guest block in large numbers. A similar protest was also carried out during the home match against Union Berlin on 19 February 2016. Other supporter groups in Germany have refused entirely to travel to away matches at the Red Bull Arena.

On some occasions, protests have involved violence and threats. RB Leipzig had to cancel three friendly matches in July 2009 for security reasons. At its first league match, away against Carl Zeiss Jena II on 8 August 2009, riots started when the police dissolved a blockade attempting to prevent the player bus from entering the stadium. The player bus was attacked with bottles, and the police had to use pepper spray to overcome them. The team was insulted, spat at and pelted with beer cups during the warm-up, and left the stadium with a police escort after the match. At an away match against Hallescher FC on 19 July 2013, the player bus was again a target. Riots then started after the match, when home supporters tried to break through a security perimeter to approach away supporters. Firecrackers and other objects were thrown at the police, and four police officers were slightly injured in the turmoil. Before an away match against Karlsruher SC on 9 March 2015, several supporters of RB Leipzig received letters, indirectly threatening them with violence if supported the team in Karlsruhe. The night before that game, local hooligans entered the player hotel's lobby in Karlsruhe.

Several football clubs, such as VfB Stuttgart, 1. FC Nürnberg, 1860 Munich, Union Berlin, Erzgebirge Aue, Kickers Offenbach, Chemnitzer FC and KSV Hessen Kassel, have cancelled friendly matches against RB Leipzig, due to protests from their own supporters.

Critics among RB Leipzig's supporters include the supporter group Rasenballisten, which describes itself as uniting critical supporters. According to what the group members have stated, the identity of a club cannot solely rely on its main sponsor; the group has criticized Red Bull GmbH for dominating how the club is represented externally. The group prefers to place emphasis on the RasenBallsport part of the club's name, as well as the Leipzig identity.

Representatives of Red Bull GmbH and RB Leipzig have commented in response to criticism. Sporting director Ralf Rangnick referred to the presence of sponsors and investors at other clubs. He rhetorically asked what the difference was between Audi's and Adidas's involvement at Bayern Munich, and the commitment of Red Bull GmbH at RB Leipzig. He admitted, though, that there was a difference: Bayern Munich first had sporting success, and then sponsors and investors showed their interest. However, he claimed that VfL Wolfsburg and Bayer Leverkusen were similar to RB Leipzig, and that VfL Wolfsburg became German champions in 2009, to a large extent due to the financial support from Volkswagen. Red Bull co-founder Dietrich Mateschitz said in 2009 that the sports commitment of Red Bull GmbH was indeed different from the sports commitments of other companies. According to the Red Bull co-founder, when the company is involved in sports, that company is directly involved in the sports operations. Red Bull co-founder Mateschitz also explained in 2007 that when the company is involved in sports, it is integrated and takes responsibility for the sports performance, and wants to build the identity of the brand and the sport. RB Leipzig club CEO Ulrich Wolter, speaking in 2013, charcaterized Dietrich Mateschitz as not an oligarch or a Sheikh who buys a toy club, but as a man interested in success with a long-term sustainable contribution to youth and professional football. RB Leipzig club CEO Ulrich Wolter, speaking in 2013 about the club's profile, said it was normal for a sponsor to want to make its brand known.

It has been suggested that the restrictive membership policy was implemented in order to prevent the club from being taken over by hostile supporters. RB Leipzig club CEO Ulrich Wolter, speaking in 2013 on his club's restrictive membership policy, said RB Leipzig prioritised its investors, ensuring the greatest possible legal certainty for them. He also said that conditions that had prevailed at some other clubs had been negative for development. Blogger Matthias Kiessling, who covered RB Leipzig continually from 2010 onwards, commented on RB Leipzig's restrictive membership policy in 2013, saying that the membership system of other clubs existed pro forma, and that participation was then happening through other outlets, such as social media. RB Leipzig and club supporters have since the club's founding successively developed procedures to enable participation and dialogue. The club entered a cooperation agreement with the supporter organization Fanprojekt Leipzig in 2013, and the club also has a dialogue with the fan representatives of the supporter union Fanverband RB Leipzig Fans.

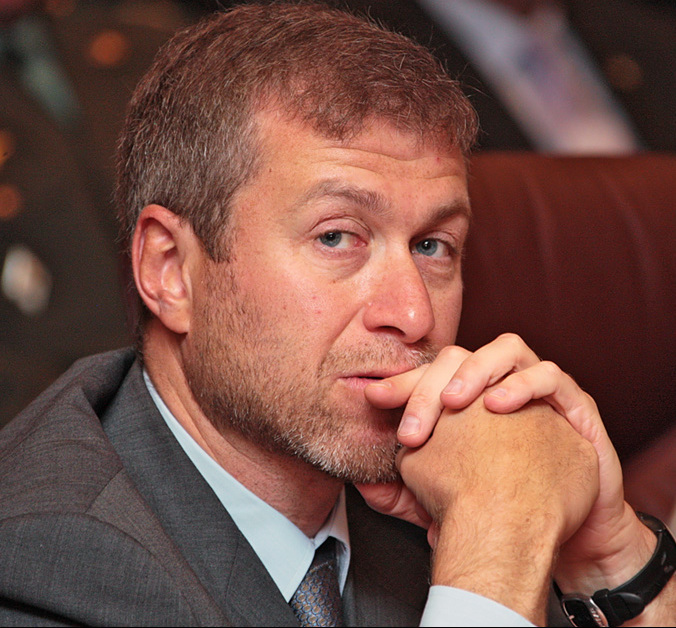
Roman Abramovich, the Russian oligarch, seen here in 2021, has been repeatedly referenced by both critics of RB Leipzig and by people associated with the club, such as Red Bull GmbH co-founder Dietrich Mateschitz and RB Leipzig club CEO Ulrich Wolter.

Both Dietrich Mateschitz and sporting director Ralf Rangnick have made comments on transfer policy. Dietrich Mateschitz commented on the football commitment of Red Bull GmbH in 2007, and said that the company was "not good stars buyers". In an interview with Austrian sports website Sportnet in 2010, he said: "I am not Abramovich. What we do, we try to do with our brain. Nothing is easier than to take a bag full of money and go shopping. That is stupid, stupid we are not". In an interview with German newspaper Leipziger Volkszeitung in 2013, he further said: "It is not about a race, to arrive as soon as possible in the Bundesliga with as many mercenaries as possible, but about healthy development and healthy growth. And that with as many own players as possible". Sporting director Ralf Rangnick, speaking in 2013 on the club's transfer policy at that time, said that RB Leipzig was fishing in a very small pond, only signing players aged between 17 and 23 years old, and that RB Leipzig was the only club in the 2. Bundesliga that had not signed any players from another club in the league. Establishing a successful youth academy has also been part of the club's long-term strategy since its founding in 2009. Dietrich Mateschitz said in 2009 that his hopes were that the majority of the professional team would in the future have come through the ranks of the club's own academy. General manager Ulrich Wolter said in 2013 that the club wanted to build an "Eastern lighthouse", so that young players from eastern Germany would not always have to migrate to the west of their country to develop. The youth work at RB Leipzig received much praise from the German Football League (DFL) in 2014.

Several people have responded to the rejection of RB Leipzig as a "plastic club", which lacks tradition. Sporting director Joachim Krug, speaking in 2009, characterized RB Leipzig as "a newly founded club" with high ambitions. Head coach Tino Vogel said that, at some point, every new tradition begins. Supporters of RB Leipzig were noted for displaying banners saying "Let this tradition begin" during the first competitive matches in 2009, and manager Dieter Gudel said in 2010 that RB Leipzig could well write "Tradition since 2009" on its pennants. Dietrich Mateschitz, speaking in 2013, characterized the only difference between RB Leipzig and Bayern Munich as one hundred years of tradition, and that in another five hundred years, RB Leipzig would be five hundred years of age and Bayern Munich six hundred years of age. By this, he meant that he expected that RB Leipzig would, some day, become a more traditional club than it is now.

Sporting director Ralf Rangnick spoke in 2012 of advantages to working in a new club without tradition. Rangnick said structural changes and staffing decisions could be implemented quickly and flexibly at RB Leipzig, because no established hierarchies would get in the way and there would be less resistance in the environment. Rangnick also stated that he "had seen enough examples of traditional clubs which have not made it anywhere". He said that, to him, what mattered was if there existed a working philosophy and sustainability. The president of the DFB Wolfgang Niersbach, speaking in 2014 with reference to clubs in Leipzig, said: "If the big traditional clubs have not managed to establish a serious way back in professional football for years and decades, then nobody should complain if a different approach is taken and this also leads to success".

RB Leipzig has received praise too, from businesspeople and politicians. Speaking in 2009, Michael Kölmel, an entrepreneur and owner of the Zentralstadion, said multinational company Red Bull GmbH was a huge opportunity for Leipzig. He also assumed that, in the end, other football clubs in Leipzig would benefit from RB Leipzig's creation. He based this on the assumption that young players would eventually stay in the area and, according to Kölmel, that the overall level of football in Leipzig would rise. Leipzig deputy mayor Heiko Rosenthal, speaking in 2010, said that RB Leipzig was the "best thing" that could happen to the economical development of Leipzig. He also believed the RB Leipzig project would bring attention to Leipzig, and that it would constitute an important component in the future economical representation of the city. Blogger Matthias Kiessling, who covered RB Leipzig continually from 2010 onwards, suggested in 2011, two years after Red Bull Leipzig had been founded, that Red Bull GmbH had given Saxony a more permanent investment than anything else since the fall of the Berlin Wall. Leipzig mayor Burkhard Jung, speaking in 2011, described Red Bull GmbH's involvement in Leipzig as an "incredible gift to the city". Dietrich Mateschitz was awarded the prize "Leipziger Lerche" in 2013 for his service to the region. Mayor Burkhard Jung described him as "honest, ambitious and serious". The prize ceremony was for the first time attended by the minister-president of Saxony, Stanislaw Tillich.

The chairman of the Saxony Football Association (SFV) Klaus Reichenbach said that he hoped Red Bull Leipzig's founding would lead to high class football, and that the region and eastern Germany might benefit. The chairman of the Northeastern German Football Association (NOFV) Rainer Milkoreit, speaking in 2014, characterized the promotion of RB Leipzig to the 2. Bundesliga as a great development for eastern Germany and that the attendance boom in Leipzig showed that Red Bull Leipzig had been awaited.

Bayern Munich president Uli Hoeneß, speaking in 2011, said that the model chosen by RB Leipzig could be prosperous, "but not necessarily". He said that what Red Bull Leipzig was capable of offering its supporters would be decisive, and, that if the model should ultimately work, it would be beneficial for football in eastern Germany. Uli Hoeneß congratulated RB Leipzig to its promotion to the 2. Bundesliga in 2014 and said that it was the best thing that could happen to football in Leipzig. FC Bayern Munich sporting director Matthias Sammer, a native of Dresden, said in 2014 that he was positive to the development of RB Leipzig, and praised the positive economical effects it had for the region. He also rejected the complaints of "traditionalists", as Lokomotive Leipzig and BSG Chemie Leipzig ever since the Wende have failed to join forces for the sake of local football. Franz Beckenbauer, speaking in 2015, predicted that RB Leipzig would be dangerous to Bayern Munich in 35 years, if Red Bull GmbH intends to invest for that long a time, and that RB Leipzig was a concept with a future.

VfL Wolfsburg manager Klaus Allofs, speaking in 2016, said that RB Leipzig was a cast of fortune for Leipzig, and a good thing for the region and for German football.

In interviews published in German newspaper Bild in 2011, representatives of several Leipzig football clubs spoke of ways they said their clubs had benefited from RB Leipzig's founding. Former Sachsen Leipzig liquidator Heiko Kratz said that, by 2009, the club was no longer able to finance its youth academy, but by selling its A to D junior teams to RB Leipzig, at least they could give the players a future. Then President of SSV Markranstädt Holger Nussbaum said the club had used Red Bull Leipzig's financial compensation to have players that it otherwise would not have, and that it was aiming to reach the Regionalliga. Ralph Zahn, then Head of department at ESV Delitzsch, said that the club had used Red Bull Leipzig's financial compensation to build an artificial turf pitch with floodlights for the cost of 250,000 euros.

According to a survey carried out by the Leipziger Volkszeitung in 2009, more than 70% of the residents of Leipzig welcomed Red Bull GmhH's investment in local football. The Leipziger Volkszeitung published results from a study carried out by Intelligence Research in Sponsorshop (Iris) in 2016. According to the study, RB Leipzig then ranked third favourite team in Saxony and Thuringia, only surpassed by Bayern Munich and Borussia Dortmund. RB Leipzig also had an increase in five out of six image values: sympathetic had increased 2.8 percent to 45.1 percent, native had increased 7.2 percent to 40.5 percent, credible had increased 4.8 percent to 43.8 percent, regionally rooted remained at 45.8 percent, ambitious had increased 3.7 percent to 77.5 percent and passionate had increased 5.8 percent to 47 percent. A study carried out by the company Repucom in 2016 showed that RB Leipzig had a nationwide increase of 60 percent in press, radio and television coverage. It also showed that the reports had become more "objective and complex".
