= UEFA Champions League clubs performance comparison =

Association football comparison

The comparison of the performances of all the clubs that participated in the UEFA Champions League is presented below. The qualifying rounds are not taken into account.

== Classification ==
C	Champion
F	Runner-up
SF	Semi-finals
QF	Quarter-finals
GS2; R16	Second group stage Round of 16
KO	Knockout round play-offs
GS; LP	Group stage League phase
•	Did not participate

== Performance ==
Countries are ranked by total number of participations, then by the number of different participating clubs, and then alphabetically. Clubs are ranked by number of participations, then by titles, runner-up finishes, semi-final appearances, quarter-final appearances, and finally alphabetically.

#	Clubs (# of participations)	92–93	93–94	94–95	95–96	96–97	97–98	98–99	99–00	00–01	01–02	02–03	03–04	04–05	05–06	06–07	07–08	08–09	09–10	10–11	11–12	12–13	13–14	14–15	15–16	16–17	17–18	18–19	19–20	20–21	21–22	22–23	23–24	24–25	25–26	26–27
(Spain)	SPAIN (123)	(0)	(1)	(1)	(1)	(1)	(2)	(3)	(3)	(4)	(4)	(4)	(4)	(4)	(4)	(3)	(4)	(4)	(4)	(3)	(4)	(4)	(4)	(4)	(5)	(4)	(4)	(4)	(4)	(4)	(5)	(4)	(5)	(4)	(5)	(5)
1	Real Madrid (31)	•	•	•	QF	•	C	QF	C	SF	C	SF	QF	R16	R16	R16	R16	R16	R16	SF	SF	SF	C	SF	C	C	C	R16	R16	SF	C	SF	C	QF	QF	
2	Barcelona (31)	•	F	QF	•	•	GS	GS	SF	GS	SF	QF	•	R16	C	R16	SF	C	SF	C	SF	SF	QF	C	QF	QF	QF	SF	QF	R16	GS	GS	QF	SF	QF	
3	Atlético Madrid (17)	•	•	•	•	QF	•	•	•	•	•	•	•	•	•	•	•	R16	GS	•	•	•	F	QF	F	SF	GS	R16	QF	R16	QF	GS	QF	R16	SF	
4	Valencia (12)	•	•	•	•	•	•	•	F	F	•	QF	•	GS	•	QF	GS	•	•	R16	GS	R16	•	•	GS	•	•	GS	R16	•	•	•	•	•	•	•
5	Sevilla (9)	•	•	•	•	•	•	•	•	•	•	•	•	•	•	•	R16	•	R16	•	•	•	•	•	GS	R16	QF	•	•	R16	GS	GS	GS	•	•	•
6	Villarreal (6)	•	•	•	•	•	•	•	•	•	•	•	•	•	SF	•	•	QF	•	•	GS	•	•	•	•	•	•	•	•	•	SF	•	•	•	LP	
7	Deportivo A Coruña (5)	•	•	•	•	•	•	•	•	QF	QF	GS2	SF	GS	•	•	•	•	•	•	•	•	•	•	•	•	•	•	•	•	•	•	•	•	•	•
8	Athletic Bilbao (3)	•	•	•	•	•	•	GS	•	•	•	•	•	•	•	•	•	•	•	•	•	•	•	GS	•	•	•	•	•	•	•	•	•	•	LP	•
9	Real Sociedad (3)	•	•	•	•	•	•	•	•	•	•	•	R16	•	•	•	•	•	•	•	•	•	GS	•	•	•	•	•	•	•	•	•	R16	•	•	•
10	Real Betis (2)	•	•	•	•	•	•	•	•	•	•	•	•	•	GS	•	•	•	•	•	•	•	•	•	•	•	•	•	•	•	•	•	•	•	•	
11	Málaga (1)	•	•	•	•	•	•	•	•	•	•	•	•	•	•	•	•	•	•	•	•	QF	•	•	•	•	•	•	•	•	•	•	•	•	•	•
12	Celta Vigo (1)	•	•	•	•	•	•	•	•	•	•	•	R16	•	•	•	•	•	•	•	•	•	•	•	•	•	•	•	•	•	•	•	•	•	•	•
13	Girona (1)	•	•	•	•	•	•	•	•	•	•	•	•	•	•	•	•	•	•	•	•	•	•	•	•	•	•	•	•	•	•	•	•	LP	•	•
14	Mallorca (1)	•	•	•	•	•	•	•	•	•	GS	•	•	•	•	•	•	•	•	•	•	•	•	•	•	•	•	•	•	•	•	•	•	•	•	•
(England)	ENGLAND (119)	(0)	(0)	(1)	(1)	(1)	(2)	(2)	(3)	(3)	(3)	(4)	(3)	(4)	(4)	(4)	(4)	(4)	(4)	(4)	(4)	(4)	(4)	(4)	(4)	(4)	(5)	(4)	(4)	(4)	(4)	(4)	(4)	(4)	(6)	(5)
1	Manchester United (26)	•	•	GS	•	SF	QF	C	QF	QF	SF	QF	R16	R16	GS	SF	C	F	QF	F	GS	R16	QF	•	GS	•	R16	QF	•	GS	R16	•	GS	•	•	
2	Arsenal (23)	•	•	•	•	•	•	GS	GS	QF	GS2	GS2	QF	R16	F	R16	QF	SF	QF	R16	R16	R16	R16	R16	R16	R16	•	•	•	•	•	•	QF	SF	F	
3	Chelsea (20)	•	•	•	•	•	•	•	QF	•	•	•	SF	SF	R16	SF	F	SF	R16	QF	C	GS	SF	R16	R16	•	R16	•	R16	C	QF	QF	•	•	R16	•
4	Liverpool (18)	•	•	•	•	•	•	•	•	•	QF	GS	•	C	R16	F	SF	QF	GS	•	•	•	•	GS	•	•	F	C	R16	QF	F	R16	•	R16	QF	
5	Manchester City (16)	•	•	•	•	•	•	•	•	•	•	•	•	•	•	•	•	•	•	•	GS	GS	R16	R16	SF	R16	QF	QF	QF	F	SF	C	QF	KO	R16	
6	Tottenham Hotspur (7)	•	•	•	•	•	•	•	•	•	•	•	•	•	•	•	•	•	•	QF	•	•	•	•	•	GS	R16	F	R16	•	•	R16	•	•	R16	•
7	Newcastle United (4)	•	•	•	•	•	GS	•	•	•	•	GS2	•	•	•	•	•	•	•	•	•	•	•	•	•	•	•	•	•	•	•	•	GS	•	R16	•
8	Aston Villa (2)	•	•	•	•	•	•	•	•	•	•	•	•	•	•	•	•	•	•	•	•	•	•	•	•	•	•	•	•	•	•	•	•	QF	•	
9	Leeds United (1)	•	•	•	•	•	•	•	•	SF	•	•	•	•	•	•	•	•	•	•	•	•	•	•	•	•	•	•	•	•	•	•	•	•	•	•
10	Leicester City (1)	•	•	•	•	•	•	•	•	•	•	•	•	•	•	•	•	•	•	•	•	•	•	•	•	QF	•	•	•	•	•	•	•	•	•	•
11	Blackburn Rovers (1)	•	•	•	GS	•	•	•	•	•	•	•	•	•	•	•	•	•	•	•	•	•	•	•	•	•	•	•	•	•	•	•	•	•	•	•
(Germany)	GERMANY (108)	(0)	(1)	(1)	(1)	(1)	(3)	(2)	(4)	(3)	(4)	(3)	(2)	(3)	(3)	(3)	(3)	(2)	(3)	(3)	(3)	(3)	(4)	(4)	(4)	(4)	(3)	(4)	(4)	(4)	(4)	(5)	(4)	(5)	(4)	(4)
1	Bayern Munich (30)	•	•	SF	•	•	QF	F	SF	C	QF	GS	R16	QF	R16	QF	•	QF	F	R16	F	C	SF	SF	SF	QF	SF	R16	C	QF	QF	QF	SF	QF	SF	
2	Borussia Dortmund (21)	•	•	•	QF	C	SF	•	GS	•	GS	GS2	•	•	•	•	•	•	•	•	GS	F	QF	R16	•	QF	GS	R16	R16	QF	GS	R16	F	QF	KO	
3	Bayer Leverkusen (15)	•	•	•	•	•	QF	•	GS	GS	F	GS2	•	R16	•	•	•	•	•	•	R16	•	R16	R16	GS	R16	•	•	GS	•	•	GS	•	R16	R16	•
4	Schalke 04 (8)	•	•	•	•	•	•	•	•	•	GS	•	•	•	GS	•	QF	•	•	SF	•	R16	R16	R16	•	•	•	R16	•	•	•	•	•	•	•	•
5	RB Leipzig (8)	•	•	•	•	•	•	•	•	•	•	•	•	•	•	•	•	•	•	•	•	•	•	•	•	•	GS	•	SF	R16	GS	R16	R16	LP	•	
6	Werder Bremen (7)	•	GS	•	•	•	•	•	•	•	•	•	•	R16	R16	GS	GS	GS	•	GS	•	•	•	•	•	•	•	•	•	•	•	•	•	•	•	•
7	VfB Stuttgart (5)	•	•	•	•	•	•	•	•	•	•	•	R16	•	•	•	GS	•	R16	•	•	•	•	•	•	•	•	•	•	•	•	•	•	LP	•	
8	VfL Wolfsburg (3)	•	•	•	•	•	•	•	•	•	•	•	•	•	•	•	•	•	GS	•	•	•	•	•	QF	•	•	•	•	•	GS	•	•	•	•	•
9	Borussia Mönchengladbach (3)	•	•	•	•	•	•	•	•	•	•	•	•	•	•	•	•	•	•	•	•	•	•	•	GS	GS	•	•	•	R16	•	•	•	•	•	•
10	Eintracht Frankfurt (2)	•	•	•	•	•	•	•	•	•	•	•	•	•	•	•	•	•	•	•	•	•	•	•	•	•	•	•	•	•	•	R16	•	•	LP	•
11	Hamburger SV (2)	•	•	•	•	•	•	•	•	GS	•	•	•	•	•	GS	•	•	•	•	•	•	•	•	•	•	•	•	•	•	•	•	•	•	•	•
12	1. FC Kaiserslautern (1)	•	•	•	•	•	•	QF	•	•	•	•	•	•	•	•	•	•	•	•	•	•	•	•	•	•	•	•	•	•	•	•	•	•	•	•
13	Hertha BSC (1)	•	•	•	•	•	•	•	GS2	•	•	•	•	•	•	•	•	•	•	•	•	•	•	•	•	•	•	•	•	•	•	•	•	•	•	•
14	TSG Hoffenheim (1)	•	•	•	•	•	•	•	•	•	•	•	•	•	•	•	•	•	•	•	•	•	•	•	•	•	•	GS	•	•	•	•	•	•	•	•
15	Union Berlin (1)	•	•	•	•	•	•	•	•	•	•	•	•	•	•	•	•	•	•	•	•	•	•	•	•	•	•	•	•	•	•	•	GS	•	•	•
(Italy)	ITALY (107)	(1)	(1)	(1)	(1)	(2)	(2)	(2)	(3)	(3)	(3)	(4)	(4)	(4)	(4)	(3)	(4)	(4)	(4)	(3)	(3)	(2)	(3)	(2)	(2)	(2)	(3)	(4)	(4)	(4)	(4)	(4)	(4)	(5)	(4)	(4)
1	Juventus (25)	•	•	•	C	F	F	SF	•	GS	GS2	F	R16	QF	QF	•	•	R16	GS	•	•	QF	GS	F	R16	F	QF	QF	R16	R16	R16	GS	•	KO	KO	•
2	Milan (21)	F	C	F	•	GS	•	•	GS	GS2	•	C	QF	F	SF	C	R16	•	R16	R16	QF	R16	R16	•	•	•	•	•	•	•	GS	SF	GS	KO	•	•
3	Inter Milan (20)	•	•	•	•	•	•	QF	•	•	•	SF	GS	QF	QF	R16	R16	R16	C	QF	R16	•	•	•	•	•	•	GS	GS	GS	R16	F	R16	F	KO	
4	Roma (12)	•	•	•	•	•	•	•	•	•	GS2	GS2	•	GS	•	QF	QF	R16	•	R16	•	•	•	GS	R16	•	SF	R16	•	•	•	•	•	•	•	
5	Napoli (10)	•	•	•	•	•	•	•	•	•	•	•	•	•	•	•	•	•	•	•	R16	•	GS	•	•	R16	GS	GS	R16	•	•	QF	R16	•	LP	
6	Lazio (7)	•	•	•	•	•	•	•	QF	GS2	GS	•	GS	•	•	•	GS	•	•	•	•	•	•	•	•	•	•	•	•	R16	•	•	R16	•	•	•
7	Atalanta (5)	•	•	•	•	•	•	•	•	•	•	•	•	•	•	•	•	•	•	•	•	•	•	•	•	•	•	•	QF	R16	GS	•	•	KO	R16	•
8	Fiorentina (3)	•	•	•	•	•	•	•	GS2	•	•	•	•	•	•	•	•	GS	R16	•	•	•	•	•	•	•	•	•	•	•	•	•	•	•	•	•
9	Bologna (1)	•	•	•	•	•	•	•	•	•	•	•	•	•	•	•	•	•	•	•	•	•	•	•	•	•	•	•	•	•	•	•	•	LP	•	•
10	Como (1)	•	•	•	•	•	•	•	•	•	•	•	•	•	•	•	•	•	•	•	•	•	•	•	•	•	•	•	•	•	•	•	•	•	•	
11	Parma (1)	•	•	•	•	•	GS	•	•	•	•	•	•	•	•	•	•	•	•	•	•	•	•	•	•	•	•	•	•	•	•	•	•	•	•	•
12	Udinese (1)	•	•	•	•	•	•	•	•	•	•	•	•	•	GS	•	•	•	•	•	•	•	•	•	•	•	•	•	•	•	•	•	•	•	•	•
(France)	FRANCE (83)	(1)	(1)	(1)	(1)	(1)	(2)	(1)	(2)	(3)	(3)	(3)	(3)	(3)	(2)	(3)	(2)	(3)	(3)	(3)	(3)	(3)	(2)	(2)	(2)	(3)	(2)	(3)	(3)	(3)	(2)	(2)	(2)	(4)	(3)	(3)
1	Paris Saint-Germain (19)	•	•	SF	•	•	GS	•	•	GS2	•	•	•	GS	•	•	•	•	•	•	•	QF	QF	QF	QF	R16	R16	R16	F	SF	R16	R16	SF	C	C	
2	Lyon (16)	•	•	•	•	•	•	•	•	GS2	GS	GS	QF	QF	QF	R16	R16	R16	SF	R16	R16	•	•	•	GS	GS	•	R16	SF	•	•	•	•	•	•	•
3	Marseille (12)	C	•	•	•	•	•	•	GS2	•	•	•	GS	•	•	•	GS	GS	GS	R16	QF	•	GS	•	•	•	•	•	•	GS	•	GS	•	•	LP	•
4	Monaco (11) (Note: Monaco is a club based in Monaco (which is not a UEFA member), but participates in the Champions League through the berths for France.)	•	SF	•	•	•	SF	•	•	GS	•	•	F	R16	•	•	•	•	•	•	•	•	•	QF	•	SF	GS	GS	•	•	•	•	•	KO	KO	•
5	Lille (9)	•	•	•	•	•	•	•	•	•	GS	•	•	•	GS	R16	•	•	•	•	GS	GS	•	•	•	•	•	•	GS	•	R16	•	•	R16	•	
6	Bordeaux (4)	•	•	•	•	•	•	•	GS2	•	•	•	•	•	•	GS	•	GS	QF	•	•	•	•	•	•	•	•	•	•	•	•	•	•	•	•	•
7	Lens (4)	•	•	•	•	•	•	GS	•	•	•	GS	•	•	•	•	•	•	•	•	•	•	•	•	•	•	•	•	•	•	•	•	GS	•	•	
8	Auxerre (3)	•	•	•	•	QF	•	•	•	•	•	GS	•	•	•	•	•	•	•	GS	•	•	•	•	•	•	•	•	•	•	•	•	•	•	•	•
9	Nantes (2)	•	•	•	SF	•	•	•	•	•	GS2	•	•	•	•	•	•	•	•	•	•	•	•	•	•	•	•	•	•	•	•	•	•	•	•	•
10	Brest (1)	•	•	•	•	•	•	•	•	•	•	•	•	•	•	•	•	•	•	•	•	•	•	•	•	•	•	•	•	•	•	•	•	KO	•	•
11	Montpellier (1)	•	•	•	•	•	•	•	•	•	•	•	•	•	•	•	•	•	•	•	•	GS	•	•	•	•	•	•	•	•	•	•	•	•	•	•
12	Rennes (1)	•	•	•	•	•	•	•	•	•	•	•	•	•	•	•	•	•	•	•	•	•	•	•	•	•	•	•	•	GS	•	•	•	•	•	•
(Portugal)	PORTUGAL (66)	(1)	(1)	(1)	(1)	(1)	(2)	(2)	(2)	(1)	(2)	(0)	(1)	(1)	(2)	(3)	(3)	(2)	(1)	(2)	(2)	(3)	(2)	(3)	(2)	(3)	(3)	(2)	(1)	(1)	(3)	(3)	(3)	(2)	(2)	(2)
1	Porto (28)	GS	SF	•	GS	QF	GS	GS	QF	•	GS2	•	C	R16	GS	R16	R16	QF	R16	•	GS	R16	GS	QF	GS	R16	R16	QF	•	QF	GS	R16	R16	•	•	
2	Benfica (20)	•	•	QF	•	•	•	GS	•	•	•	•	•	•	QF	GS	GS	•	•	GS	QF	GS	GS	GS	QF	R16	GS	GS	GS	•	QF	QF	GS	R16	KO	•
3	Sporting CP (13)	•	•	•	•	•	GS	•	•	GS	•	•	•	•	•	GS	GS	R16	•	•	•	•	•	GS	•	GS	GS	•	•	•	R16	GS	•	KO	QF	
4	Braga (3)	•	•	•	•	•	•	•	•	•	•	•	•	•	•	•	•	•	•	GS	•	GS	•	•	•	•	•	•	•	•	•	•	GS	•	•	•
5	Boavista (2)	•	•	•	•	•	•	•	GS	•	GS2	•	•	•	•	•	•	•	•	•	•	•	•	•	•	•	•	•	•	•	•	•	•	•	•	•
(Netherlands)	NETHERLANDS (51)	(1)	(0)	(1)	(1)	(1)	(2)	(2)	(3)	(2)	(2)	(3)	(2)	(2)	(2)	(1)	(1)	(1)	(1)	(2)	(1)	(1)	(1)	(1)	(1)	(1)	(1)	(2)	(1)	(1)	(1)	(1)	(2)	(2)	(2)	(2)
1	PSV Eindhoven (20)	GS	•	•	•	•	GS	GS	GS	GS	GS	GS	GS	SF	R16	QF	GS	GS	•	•	•	•	•	•	R16	GS	•	GS	•	•	•	•	R16	R16	LP	
2	Ajax (19)	•	•	C	F	SF	•	GS	•	•	•	QF	GS	GS	R16	•	•	•	•	GS	GS	GS	GS	GS	•	•	•	SF	GS	GS	R16	GS	•	•	LP	•
3	Feyenoord (8)	•	•	•	•	•	GS	•	GS2	•	GS	GS	•	•	•	•	•	•	•	•	•	•	•	•	•	•	GS	•	•	•	•	•	GS	R16	•	
4	AZ (1)	•	•	•	•	•	•	•	•	•	•	•	•	•	•	•	•	•	GS	•	•	•	•	•	•	•	•	•	•	•	•	•	•	•	•	•
5	Heerenveen (1)	•	•	•	•	•	•	•	•	GS	•	•	•	•	•	•	•	•	•	•	•	•	•	•	•	•	•	•	•	•	•	•	•	•	•	•
6	Twente (1)	•	•	•	•	•	•	•	•	•	•	•	•	•	•	•	•	•	•	GS	•	•	•	•	•	•	•	•	•	•	•	•	•	•	•	•
7	Willem II (1)	•	•	•	•	•	•	•	GS	•	•	•	•	•	•	•	•	•	•	•	•	•	•	•	•	•	•	•	•	•	•	•	•	•	•	•
(Russia)	RUSSIA (43)	(1)	(1)	(1)	(1)	(0)	(0)	(1)	(1)	(1)	(2)	(2)	(1)	(1)	(0)	(2)	(1)	(1)	(2)	(2)	(2)	(2)	(2)	(2)	(2)	(2)	(2)	(2)	(2)	(3)	(1)	(0)	(0)	(0)	(0)	(0)
1	CSKA Moscow (12)	GS	•	•	•	•	•	•	•	•	•	•	•	GS	•	GS	GS	•	QF	•	R16	•	GS	GS	GS	GS	GS	GS	•	•	•	•	•	•	•	•
2	Spartak Moscow (12)	•	GS	GS	QF	•	•	GS	GS	GS2	GS	GS	•	•	•	GS	•	•	•	GS	•	GS	•	•	•	•	GS	•	•	•	•	•	•	•	•	•
3	Zenit Saint Petersburg (9)	•	•	•	•	•	•	•	•	•	•	•	•	•	•	•	•	GS	•	•	R16	GS	R16	GS	R16	•	•	•	GS	GS	GS	•	•	•	•	•
4	Lokomotiv Moscow (6)	•	•	•	•	•	•	•	•	•	GS	GS2	R16	•	•	•	•	•	•	•	•	•	•	•	•	•	•	GS	GS	GS	•	•	•	•	•	•
5	Rubin Kazan (2)	•	•	•	•	•	•	•	•	•	•	•	•	•	•	•	•	•	GS	GS	•	•	•	•	•	•	•	•	•	•	•	•	•	•	•	•
6	Krasnodar (1)	•	•	•	•	•	•	•	•	•	•	•	•	•	•	•	•	•	•	•	•	•	•	•	•	•	•	•	•	GS	•	•	•	•	•	•
7	Rostov (1)	•	•	•	•	•	•	•	•	•	•	•	•	•	•	•	•	•	•	•	•	•	•	•	•	GS	•	•	•	•	•	•	•	•	•	•
(Ukraine)	UKRAINE (38)	(0)	(0)	(1)	(0)	(0)	(1)	(1)	(1)	(2)	(1)	(1)	(1)	(2)	(0)	(2)	(2)	(2)	(1)	(1)	(1)	(2)	(1)	(1)	(2)	(1)	(1)	(1)	(1)	(2)	(2)	(1)	(1)	(1)	(0)	(1)
1	Shakhtar Donetsk (20)	•	•	•	•	•	•	•	•	GS	•	•	•	GS	•	GS	GS	GS	•	QF	GS	R16	GS	R16	GS	•	R16	GS	GS	GS	GS	GS	GS	LP	•	
2	Dynamo Kyiv (18)	•	•	GS	•	•	QF	SF	GS2	GS	GS	GS	GS	GS	•	GS	GS	GS	GS	•	•	GS	•	•	R16	GS	•	•	•	GS	GS	•	•	•	•	•
(Turkey)	TURKEY (37)	(0)	(1)	(1)	(0)	(1)	(2)	(1)	(1)	(2)	(2)	(1)	(2)	(1)	(1)	(1)	(2)	(1)	(1)	(1)	(1)	(1)	(1)	(1)	(1)	(1)	(1)	(1)	(1)	(1)	(1)	(0)	(1)	(0)	(1)	(2)
1	Galatasaray (19)	•	GS	GS	•	•	GS	GS	GS	QF	GS2	GS	GS	•	•	GS	•	•	•	•	•	QF	R16	GS	GS	•	•	GS	GS	•	•	•	GS	•	R16	
2	Beşiktaş (8)	•	•	•	•	•	GS	•	•	GS	•	•	GS	•	•	•	GS	•	GS	•	•	•	•	•	•	GS	R16	•	•	•	GS	•	•	•	•	•
3	Fenerbahçe (7)	•	•	•	•	GS	•	•	•	•	GS	•	•	GS	GS	•	QF	GS	•	•	•	•	•	•	•	•	•	•	•	•	•	•	•	•	•	
4	Bursaspor (1)	•	•	•	•	•	•	•	•	•	•	•	•	•	•	•	•	•	•	GS	•	•	•	•	•	•	•	•	•	•	•	•	•	•	•	•
5	İstanbul Başakşehir (1)	•	•	•	•	•	•	•	•	•	•	•	•	•	•	•	•	•	•	•	•	•	•	•	•	•	•	•	•	GS	•	•	•	•	•	•
6	Trabzonspor (1)	•	•	•	•	•	•	•	•	•	•	•	•	•	•	•	•	•	•	•	GS	•	•	•	•	•	•	•	•	•	•	•	•	•	•	•
(Greece)	GREECE (36)	(0)	(0)	(1)	(1)	(0)	(1)	(2)	(1)	(2)	(2)	(2)	(3)	(2)	(2)	(2)	(1)	(1)	(1)	(1)	(1)	(1)	(1)	(1)	(1)	(0)	(1)	(1)	(1)	(1)	(0)	(0)	(0)	(0)	(1)	(1)
1	Olympiacos (21)	•	•	•	•	•	GS	QF	GS	GS	GS	GS	GS	GS	GS	GS	R16	•	R16	•	GS	GS	R16	GS	GS	•	GS	•	GS	GS	•	•	•	•	KO	•
2	Panathinaikos (9)	•	•	•	SF	•	•	GS	•	GS2	QF	•	GS	GS	GS	•	•	R16	•	GS	•	•	•	•	•	•	•	•	•	•	•	•	•	•	•	•
3	AEK Athens (6)	•	•	GS	•	•	•	•	•	•	•	GS	GS	•	•	GS	•	•	•	•	•	•	•	•	•	•	•	GS	•	•	•	•	•	•	•	
(Belgium)	BELGIUM (33)	(1)	(1)	(1)	(0)	(0)	(1)	(0)	(0)	(1)	(1)	(2)	(2)	(1)	(2)	(1)	(0)	(0)	(1)	(0)	(1)	(1)	(1)	(1)	(1)	(1)	(1)	(1)	(2)	(1)	(1)	(1)	(1)	(1)	(2)	(1)
1	Club Brugge (13)	GS	•	•	•	•	•	•	•	•	•	GS	GS	•	GS	•	•	•	•	•	•	•	•	•	•	GS	•	GS	GS	GS	GS	R16	•	R16	KO	
2	Anderlecht (12)	•	GS	GS	•	•	•	•	•	GS2	GS	•	GS	GS	GS	GS	•	•	•	•	•	GS	GS	GS	•	•	GS	•	•	•	•	•	•	•	•	•
3	Genk (3)	•	•	•	•	•	•	•	•	•	•	GS	•	•	•	•	•	•	•	•	GS	•	•	•	•	•	•	•	GS	•	•	•	•	•	•	•
4	Antwerp (1)	•	•	•	•	•	•	•	•	•	•	•	•	•	•	•	•	•	•	•	•	•	•	•	•	•	•	•	•	•	•	•	GS	•	•	•
5	Gent (1)	•	•	•	•	•	•	•	•	•	•	•	•	•	•	•	•	•	•	•	•	•	•	•	R16	•	•	•	•	•	•	•	•	•	•	•
6	Lierse (1)	•	•	•	•	•	GS	•	•	•	•	•	•	•	•	•	•	•	•	•	•	•	•	•	•	•	•	•	•	•	•	•	•	•	•	•
7	Standard Liège (1)	•	•	•	•	•	•	•	•	•	•	•	•	•	•	•	•	•	GS	•	•	•	•	•	•	•	•	•	•	•	•	•	•	•	•	•
8	Union Saint-Gilloise (1)	•	•	•	•	•	•	•	•	•	•	•	•	•	•	•	•	•	•	•	•	•	•	•	•	•	•	•	•	•	•	•	•	•	LP	•
(Scotland)	SCOTLAND (24)	(1)	(0)	(0)	(1)	(1)	(0)	(0)	(1)	(1)	(1)	(0)	(2)	(1)	(1)	(1)	(2)	(1)	(1)	(1)	(0)	(1)	(1)	(0)	(0)	(1)	(1)	(0)	(0)	(0)	(0)	(2)	(1)	(1)	(0)	(0)
1	Celtic (13)	•	•	•	•	•	•	•	•	•	GS	•	GS	GS	•	R16	R16	GS	•	•	•	R16	GS	•	•	GS	GS	•	•	•	•	GS	GS	KO	•	•
2	Rangers (11)	GS	•	•	GS	GS	•	•	GS	GS	•	•	GS	•	R16	•	GS	•	GS	GS	•	•	•	•	•	•	•	•	•	•	•	GS	•	•	•	•
(Switzerland)	SWITZERLAND (16)	(0)	(0)	(0)	(1)	(1)	(0)	(0)	(0)	(0)	(0)	(1)	(0)	(0)	(1)	(0)	(0)	(1)	(1)	(1)	(1)	(0)	(1)	(1)	(0)	(1)	(1)	(1)	(0)	(0)	(1)	(0)	(1)	(1)	(0)	(0)
1	Basel (8)	•	•	•	•	•	•	•	•	•	•	GS2	•	•	•	•	•	GS	•	GS	R16	•	GS	R16	•	GS	R16	•	•	•	•	•	•	•	•	•
2	Young Boys (4)	•	•	•	•	•	•	•	•	•	•	•	•	•	•	•	•	•	•	•	•	•	•	•	•	•	•	GS	•	•	GS	•	GS	LP	•	•
3	Grasshopper (2)	•	•	•	GS	GS	•	•	•	•	•	•	•	•	•	•	•	•	•	•	•	•	•	•	•	•	•	•	•	•	•	•	•	•	•	•
4	Thun (1)	•	•	•	•	•	•	•	•	•	•	•	•	•	GS	•	•	•	•	•	•	•	•	•	•	•	•	•	•	•	•	•	•	•	•	•
5	Zürich (1)	•	•	•	•	•	•	•	•	•	•	•	•	•	•	•	•	•	GS	•	•	•	•	•	•	•	•	•	•	•	•	•	•	•	•	•
(Czech Republic)	CZECH REPUBLIC (16)	(0)	(0)	(0)	(0)	(0)	(1)	(0)	(1)	(1)	(1)	(0)	(1)	(1)	(1)	(0)	(1)	(0)	(0)	(0)	(1)	(0)	(1)	(0)	(0)	(0)	(0)	(1)	(1)	(0)	(0)	(1)	(0)	(1)	(1)	(1)
1	Sparta Prague (8)	•	•	•	•	•	GS	•	GS2	GS	GS2	•	R16	GS	GS	•	•	•	•	•	•	•	•	•	•	•	•	•	•	•	•	•	•	LP	•	•
2	Slavia Prague (4)	•	•	•	•	•	•	•	•	•	•	•	•	•	•	•	GS	•	•	•	•	•	•	•	•	•	•	•	GS	•	•	•	•	•	LP	
3	Viktoria Plzeň (4)	•	•	•	•	•	•	•	•	•	•	•	•	•	•	•	•	•	•	•	GS	•	GS	•	•	•	•	GS	•	•	•	GS	•	•	•	•
(Austria)	AUSTRIA (15)	(0)	(0)	(1)	(0)	(1)	(0)	(1)	(1)	(1)	(0)	(0)	(0)	(0)	(1)	(0)	(0)	(0)	(0)	(0)	(0)	(0)	(1)	(0)	(0)	(0)	(0)	(0)	(1)	(1)	(1)	(1)	(1)	(2)	(0)	(1)
1	Red Bull Salzburg (7)	•	•	GS	•	•	•	•	•	•	•	•	•	•	•	•	•	•	•	•	•	•	•	•	•	•	•	•	GS	GS	R16	GS	GS	LP	•	•
2	Sturm Graz (4)	•	•	•	•	•	•	GS	GS	GS2	•	•	•	•	•	•	•	•	•	•	•	•	•	•	•	•	•	•	•	•	•	•	•	LP	•	•
3	Rapid Wien (2)	•	•	•	•	GS	•	•	•	•	•	•	•	•	GS	•	•	•	•	•	•	•	•	•	•	•	•	•	•	•	•	•	•	•	•	•
4	Austria Wien (1)	•	•	•	•	•	•	•	•	•	•	•	•	•	•	•	•	•	•	•	•	•	GS	•	•	•	•	•	•	•	•	•	•	•	•	•
5	LASK (1)	•	•	•	•	•	•	•	•	•	•	•	•	•	•	•	•	•	•	•	•	•	•	•	•	•	•	•	•	•	•	•	•	•	•	
(Norway)	NORWAY (15)	(0)	(0)	(0)	(1)	(1)	(1)	(1)	(2)	(1)	(1)	(1)	(0)	(1)	(1)	(0)	(1)	(0)	(0)	(0)	(0)	(0)	(0)	(0)	(0)	(0)	(0)	(0)	(0)	(0)	(0)	(0)	(0)	(0)	(1)	(2)
1	Rosenborg (11)	•	•	•	GS	QF	GS	GS	GS2	GS	GS	GS	•	GS	GS	•	GS	•	•	•	•	•	•	•	•	•	•	•	•	•	•	•	•	•	•	•
2	Bodø/Glimt (2)	•	•	•	•	•	•	•	•	•	•	•	•	•	•	•	•	•	•	•	•	•	•	•	•	•	•	•	•	•	•	•	•	•	R16	
3	Molde (1)	•	•	•	•	•	•	•	GS	•	•	•	•	•	•	•	•	•	•	•	•	•	•	•	•	•	•	•	•	•	•	•	•	•	•	•
4	Viking (1)	•	•	•	•	•	•	•	•	•	•	•	•	•	•	•	•	•	•	•	•	•	•	•	•	•	•	•	•	•	•	•	•	•	•	
(Denmark)	DENMARK (12)	(0)	(0)	(0)	(1)	(0)	(0)	(1)	(0)	(0)	(0)	(0)	(0)	(0)	(0)	(1)	(0)	(1)	(0)	(1)	(0)	(1)	(1)	(0)	(0)	(1)	(0)	(0)	(0)	(1)	(0)	(1)	(1)	(0)	(1)	(0)
1	Copenhagen (7)	•	•	•	•	•	•	•	•	•	•	•	•	•	•	GS	•	•	•	R16	•	•	GS	•	•	GS	•	•	•	•	•	GS	R16	•	LP	•
2	AaB (2)	•	•	•	GS	•	•	•	•	•	•	•	•	•	•	•	•	GS	•	•	•	•	•	•	•	•	•	•	•	•	•	•	•	•	•	•
3	Brøndby (1)	•	•	•	•	•	•	GS	•	•	•	•	•	•	•	•	•	•	•	•	•	•	•	•	•	•	•	•	•	•	•	•	•	•	•	•
4	Midtjylland (1)	•	•	•	•	•	•	•	•	•	•	•	•	•	•	•	•	•	•	•	•	•	•	•	•	•	•	•	•	GS	•	•	•	•	•	•
5	Nordsjælland (1)	•	•	•	•	•	•	•	•	•	•	•	•	•	•	•	•	•	•	•	•	GS	•	•	•	•	•	•	•	•	•	•	•	•	•	•
(Romania)	ROMANIA (12)	(0)	(0)	(1)	(1)	(1)	(0)	(0)	(0)	(0)	(0)	(0)	(0)	(0)	(0)	(1)	(1)	(2)	(1)	(1)	(1)	(1)	(1)	(0)	(0)	(0)	(0)	(0)	(0)	(0)	(0)	(0)	(0)	(0)	(0)	(0)
1	Steaua București (7)	•	•	GS	GS	GS	•	•	•	•	•	•	•	•	•	GS	GS	GS	•	•	•	•	GS	•	•	•	•	•	•	•	•	•	•	•	•	•
2	CFR Cluj (3)	•	•	•	•	•	•	•	•	•	•	•	•	•	•	•	•	GS	•	GS	•	GS	•	•	•	•	•	•	•	•	•	•	•	•	•	•
3	Oțelul Galați (1)	•	•	•	•	•	•	•	•	•	•	•	•	•	•	•	•	•	•	•	GS	•	•	•	•	•	•	•	•	•	•	•	•	•	•	•
4	Unirea Urziceni (1)	•	•	•	•	•	•	•	•	•	•	•	•	•	•	•	•	•	GS	•	•	•	•	•	•	•	•	•	•	•	•	•	•	•	•	•
(Croatia)	CROATIA (10)	(0)	(0)	(1)	(0)	(0)	(0)	(1)	(1)	(0)	(0)	(0)	(0)	(0)	(0)	(0)	(0)	(0)	(0)	(0)	(1)	(1)	(0)	(0)	(1)	(1)	(0)	(0)	(1)	(0)	(0)	(1)	(0)	(1)	(0)	(0)
1	Dinamo Zagreb (9)	•	•	•	•	•	•	GS	GS	•	•	•	•	•	•	•	•	•	•	•	GS	GS	•	•	GS	GS	•	•	GS	•	•	GS	•	LP	•	•
2	Hajduk Split (1)	•	•	QF	•	•	•	•	•	•	•	•	•	•	•	•	•	•	•	•	•	•	•	•	•	•	•	•	•	•	•	•	•	•	•	•
(Sweden)	SWEDEN (9)	(1)	(0)	(1)	(0)	(1)	(1)	(0)	(1)	(1)	(0)	(0)	(0)	(0)	(0)	(0)	(0)	(0)	(0)	(0)	(0)	(0)	(0)	(1)	(1)	(0)	(0)	(0)	(0)	(0)	(1)	(0)	(0)	(0)	(0)	(0)
1	IFK Göteborg (4)	GS	•	QF	•	GS	GS	•	•	•	•	•	•	•	•	•	•	•	•	•	•	•	•	•	•	•	•	•	•	•	•	•	•	•	•	•
2	Malmö FF (3)	•	•	•	•	•	•	•	•	•	•	•	•	•	•	•	•	•	•	•	•	•	•	GS	GS	•	•	•	•	•	GS	•	•	•	•	•
3	AIK (1)	•	•	•	•	•	•	•	GS	•	•	•	•	•	•	•	•	•	•	•	•	•	•	•	•	•	•	•	•	•	•	•	•	•	•	•
4	Helsingborgs IF (1)	•	•	•	•	•	•	•	•	GS	•	•	•	•	•	•	•	•	•	•	•	•	•	•	•	•	•	•	•	•	•	•	•	•	•	•
(Cyprus)	CYPRUS (6)	(0)	(0)	(0)	(0)	(0)	(0)	(0)	(0)	(0)	(0)	(0)	(0)	(0)	(0)	(0)	(0)	(1)	(1)	(0)	(1)	(0)	(0)	(1)	(0)	(0)	(1)	(0)	(0)	(0)	(0)	(0)	(0)	(0)	(1)	(0)
1	APOEL (4)	•	•	•	•	•	•	•	•	•	•	•	•	•	•	•	•	•	GS	•	QF	•	•	GS	•	•	GS	•	•	•	•	•	•	•	•	•
2	Anorthosis (1)	•	•	•	•	•	•	•	•	•	•	•	•	•	•	•	•	GS	•	•	•	•	•	•	•	•	•	•	•	•	•	•	•	•	•	•
3	Pafos (1)	•	•	•	•	•	•	•	•	•	•	•	•	•	•	•	•	•	•	•	•	•	•	•	•	•	•	•	•	•	•	•	•	•	LP	•
(Israel)	ISRAEL (6)	(0)	(0)	(0)	(0)	(0)	(0)	(0)	(0)	(0)	(0)	(1)	(0)	(1)	(0)	(0)	(0)	(0)	(1)	(1)	(0)	(0)	(0)	(0)	(1)	(0)	(0)	(0)	(0)	(0)	(0)	(1)	(0)	(0)	(0)	(0)
1	Maccabi Haifa (3)	•	•	•	•	•	•	•	•	•	•	GS	•	•	•	•	•	•	GS	•	•	•	•	•	•	•	•	•	•	•	•	GS	•	•	•	•
2	Maccabi Tel Aviv (2)	•	•	•	•	•	•	•	•	•	•	•	•	GS	•	•	•	•	•	•	•	•	•	•	GS	•	•	•	•	•	•	•	•	•	•	•
3	Hapoel Tel Aviv (1)	•	•	•	•	•	•	•	•	•	•	•	•	•	•	•	•	•	•	GS	•	•	•	•	•	•	•	•	•	•	•	•	•	•	•	•
(Serbia)	SERBIA (6)	(0)	(0)	(0)	(0)	(0)	(0)	(0)	(0)	(0)	(0)	(0)	(1)	(0)	(0)	(0)	(0)	(0)	(0)	(1)	(0)	(0)	(0)	(0)	(0)	(0)	(0)	(1)	(1)	(0)	(0)	(0)	(1)	(1)	(0)	(0)
1	Red Star Belgrade (4)	•	•	•	•	•	•	•	•	•	•	•	•	•	•	•	•	•	•	•	•	•	•	•	•	•	•	GS	GS	•	•	•	GS	LP	•	•
2	Partizan (2)	•	•	•	•	•	•	•	•	•	•	•	GS	•	•	•	•	•	•	GS	•	•	•	•	•	•	•	•	•	•	•	•	•	•	•	•
(Slovakia)	SLOVAKIA (5)	(0)	(0)	(0)	(0)	(0)	(1)	(0)	(0)	(0)	(0)	(0)	(0)	(0)	(1)	(0)	(0)	(0)	(0)	(1)	(0)	(0)	(0)	(0)	(0)	(0)	(0)	(0)	(0)	(0)	(0)	(0)	(0)	(1)	(0)	(1)
1	Slovan Bratislava (2)	•	•	•	•	•	•	•	•	•	•	•	•	•	•	•	•	•	•	•	•	•	•	•	•	•	•	•	•	•	•	•	•	LP	•	
2	Košice (1)	•	•	•	•	•	GS	•	•	•	•	•	•	•	•	•	•	•	•	•	•	•	•	•	•	•	•	•	•	•	•	•	•	•	•	•
3	Petržalka (1)	•	•	•	•	•	•	•	•	•	•	•	•	•	GS	•	•	•	•	•	•	•	•	•	•	•	•	•	•	•	•	•	•	•	•	•
4	Žilina (1)	•	•	•	•	•	•	•	•	•	•	•	•	•	•	•	•	•	•	GS	•	•	•	•	•	•	•	•	•	•	•	•	•	•	•	•
(Belarus)	BELARUS (5)	(0)	(0)	(0)	(0)	(0)	(0)	(0)	(0)	(0)	(0)	(0)	(0)	(0)	(0)	(0)	(0)	(1)	(0)	(0)	(1)	(1)	(0)	(1)	(1)	(0)	(0)	(0)	(0)	(0)	(0)	(0)	(0)	(0)	(0)	(0)
1	BATE Borisov (5)	•	•	•	•	•	•	•	•	•	•	•	•	•	•	•	•	GS	•	•	GS	GS	•	GS	GS	•	•	•	•	•	•	•	•	•	•	•
(Azerbaijan)	AZERBAIJAN (3)	(0)	(0)	(0)	(0)	(0)	(0)	(0)	(0)	(0)	(0)	(0)	(0)	(0)	(0)	(0)	(0)	(0)	(0)	(0)	(0)	(0)	(0)	(0)	(0)	(0)	(1)	(0)	(0)	(0)	(0)	(0)	(0)	(0)	(1)	(1)
1	Qarabağ (2)	•	•	•	•	•	•	•	•	•	•	•	•	•	•	•	•	•	•	•	•	•	•	•	•	•	GS	•	•	•	•	•	•	•	KO	•
2	Sabah (1)	•	•	•	•	•	•	•	•	•	•	•	•	•	•	•	•	•	•	•	•	•	•	•	•	•	•	•	•	•	•	•	•	•	•	
(Bulgaria)	BULGARIA (3)	(0)	(0)	(0)	(0)	(0)	(0)	(0)	(0)	(0)	(0)	(0)	(0)	(0)	(0)	(1)	(0)	(0)	(0)	(0)	(0)	(0)	(0)	(1)	(0)	(1)	(0)	(0)	(0)	(0)	(0)	(0)	(0)	(0)	(0)	(0)
1	Ludogorets Razgrad (2)	•	•	•	•	•	•	•	•	•	•	•	•	•	•	•	•	•	•	•	•	•	•	GS	•	GS	•	•	•	•	•	•	•	•	•	•
2	Levski Sofia (1)	•	•	•	•	•	•	•	•	•	•	•	•	•	•	GS	•	•	•	•	•	•	•	•	•	•	•	•	•	•	•	•	•	•	•	•
(Hungary)	HUNGARY (3)	(0)	(0)	(0)	(1)	(0)	(0)	(0)	(0)	(0)	(0)	(0)	(0)	(0)	(0)	(0)	(0)	(0)	(1)	(0)	(0)	(0)	(0)	(0)	(0)	(0)	(0)	(0)	(0)	(1)	(0)	(0)	(0)	(0)	(0)	(0)
1	Ferencváros (2)	•	•	•	GS	•	•	•	•	•	•	•	•	•	•	•	•	•	•	•	•	•	•	•	•	•	•	•	•	GS	•	•	•	•	•	•
2	Debrecen (1)	•	•	•	•	•	•	•	•	•	•	•	•	•	•	•	•	•	GS	•	•	•	•	•	•	•	•	•	•	•	•	•	•	•	•	•
(Poland)	POLAND (3)	(0)	(0)	(0)	(1)	(1)	(0)	(0)	(0)	(0)	(0)	(0)	(0)	(0)	(0)	(0)	(0)	(0)	(0)	(0)	(0)	(0)	(0)	(0)	(0)	(1)	(0)	(0)	(0)	(0)	(0)	(0)	(0)	(0)	(0)	(0)
1	Legia Warsaw (2)	•	•	•	QF	•	•	•	•	•	•	•	•	•	•	•	•	•	•	•	•	•	•	•	•	GS	•	•	•	•	•	•	•	•	•	•
2	Widzew Łódź (1)	•	•	•	•	GS	•	•	•	•	•	•	•	•	•	•	•	•	•	•	•	•	•	•	•	•	•	•	•	•	•	•	•	•	•	•
(Slovenia)	SLOVENIA (3)	(0)	(0)	(0)	(0)	(0)	(0)	(0)	(1)	(0)	(0)	(0)	(0)	(0)	(0)	(0)	(0)	(0)	(0)	(0)	(0)	(0)	(0)	(1)	(0)	(0)	(1)	(0)	(0)	(0)	(0)	(0)	(0)	(0)	(0)	(0)
1	Maribor (3)	•	•	•	•	•	•	•	GS	•	•	•	•	•	•	•	•	•	•	•	•	•	•	GS	•	•	GS	•	•	•	•	•	•	•	•	•
(Kazakhstan)	KAZAKHSTAN (2)	(0)	(0)	(0)	(0)	(0)	(0)	(0)	(0)	(0)	(0)	(0)	(0)	(0)	(0)	(0)	(0)	(0)	(0)	(0)	(0)	(0)	(0)	(0)	(1)	(0)	(0)	(0)	(0)	(0)	(0)	(0)	(0)	(0)	(1)	(0)
1	Astana (1)	•	•	•	•	•	•	•	•	•	•	•	•	•	•	•	•	•	•	•	•	•	•	•	GS	•	•	•	•	•	•	•	•	•	•	•
2	Kairat (1)	•	•	•	•	•	•	•	•	•	•	•	•	•	•	•	•	•	•	•	•	•	•	•	•	•	•	•	•	•	•	•	•	•	LP	•
(Finland)	FINLAND (1)	(0)	(0)	(0)	(0)	(0)	(0)	(1)	(0)	(0)	(0)	(0)	(0)	(0)	(0)	(0)	(0)	(0)	(0)	(0)	(0)	(0)	(0)	(0)	(0)	(0)	(0)	(0)	(0)	(0)	(0)	(0)	(0)	(0)	(0)	(0)
1	HJK (1)	•	•	•	•	•	•	GS	•	•	•	•	•	•	•	•	•	•	•	•	•	•	•	•	•	•	•	•	•	•	•	•	•	•	•	•
(Moldova)	MOLDOVA (1)	(0)	(0)	(0)	(0)	(0)	(0)	(0)	(0)	(0)	(0)	(0)	(0)	(0)	(0)	(0)	(0)	(0)	(0)	(0)	(0)	(0)	(0)	(0)	(0)	(0)	(0)	(0)	(0)	(0)	(1)	(0)	(0)	(0)	(0)	(0)
1	Sheriff Tiraspol (1)	•	•	•	•	•	•	•	•	•	•	•	•	•	•	•	•	•	•	•	•	•	•	•	•	•	•	•	•	•	GS	•	•	•	•	•

== See also ==
- UEFA Champions League
- European Cup and UEFA Champions League records and statistics
- UEFA Europa League clubs performance comparison
- UEFA Conference League clubs performance comparison
- UEFA Women's Champions League clubs performance comparison
- AFC Champions League Elite clubs performance comparison
