= UEFA Europa League clubs performance comparison =

Football competition statistics

The comparison of the performances of all of the clubs that participated in the UEFA Europa League in its current format (2009–present) is below. The qualification rounds are not taken into account.

Clubs transferred from UEFA Champions League marked in italics.

== Classification ==
| C | Champion |
| F | Runner-up |
| SF | Semi-finals |
| QF | Quarter-finals |
| R16 | Round of 16 |
| KO | Knockout round play-offs |
| R32 | Round of 32 |
| GS; LP | Group stage League phase |
| 2R | Second round |
| 1R | First round |
| • | Did not participate |

== Performance ==
Countries are ranked by total number of participations, then by the number of different participating clubs, and then alphabetically. Clubs are ranked by number of participations, then by titles, runner-up finishes, semi-final appearances, quarter-final appearances, and finally alphabetically.

| # | Clubs (# of participations) | 09–10 | 10–11 | 11–12 | 12–13 | 13–14 | 14–15 | 15–16 | 16–17 | 17–18 | 18–19 | 19–20 | 20–21 | 21–22 | 22–23 | 23–24 | 24–25 | 25–26 | 26–27 |
|---|---|---|---|---|---|---|---|---|---|---|---|---|---|---|---|---|---|---|---|
| (Italy) | ITALY (59) | (4) | (4) | (2) | (4) | (4) | (5) | (3) | (4) | (4) | (4) | (3) | (3) | (3) | (3) | (3) | (2) | (2) | (2) |
| 1 | Lazio (11) | GS | • | R32 | QF | R32 | • | R16 | • | QF | R32 | GS | • | KO | GS | • | QF | • | • |
| 2 | Roma (9) | R32 | • | • | • | • | R16 | • | R16 | • | • | R16 | SF | • | F | SF | R16 | R16 | • |
| 3 | Napoli (9) | • | R32 | • | R32 | R16 | SF | R32 | • | R32 | QF | • | R32 | KO | • | • | • | • | • |
| 4 | Inter Milan (5) | • | • | • | R16 | • | R16 | • | GS | • | R16 | F | • | • | • | • | • | • | • |
| 5 | Juventus (5) | R16 | GS | • | • | SF | • | • | • | • | • | • | • | • | SF | • | • | • | |
| 6 | Milan (5) | • | • | • | • | • | • | • | • | R16 | GS | • | R16 | • | • | QF | • | • | |
| 7 | Fiorentina (4) | • | • | • | • | R16 | SF | R32 | R32 | • | • | • | • | • | • | • | • | • | • |
| 8 | Atalanta (3) | • | • | • | • | • | • | • | • | R32 | • | • | • | QF | • | C | • | • | • |
| 9 | Udinese (2) | • | • | R16 | GS | • | • | • | • | • | • | • | • | • | • | • | • | • | • |
| 10 | Bologna (1) | • | • | • | • | • | • | • | • | • | • | • | • | • | • | • | • | QF | • |
| 11 | Genoa (1) | GS | • | • | • | • | • | • | • | • | • | • | • | • | • | • | • | • | • |
| 12 | Palermo (1) | • | GS | • | • | • | • | • | • | • | • | • | • | • | • | • | • | • | • |
| 13 | Sampdoria (1) | • | GS | • | • | • | • | • | • | • | • | • | • | • | • | • | • | • | • |
| 14 | Sassuolo (1) | • | • | • | • | • | • | • | GS | • | • | • | • | • | • | • | • | • | • |
| 15 | Torino (1) | • | • | • | • | • | R16 | • | • | • | • | • | • | • | • | • | • | • | • |
| (Spain) | SPAIN (57) | (4) | (4) | (3) | (3) | (3) | (3) | (4) | (3) | (4) | (4) | (3) | (3) | (4) | (4) | (2) | (2) | (2) | (2) |
| 1 | Villarreal (9) | R32 | SF | • | • | • | R16 | SF | R32 | R32 | QF | • | C | • | • | R16 | • | • | • |
| 2 | Sevilla (8) | • | R32 | • | • | C | C | C | • | • | R16 | C | • | R16 | C | • | • | • | • |
| 3 | Athletic Bilbao (8) | R32 | • | F | GS | • | R32 | QF | R32 | R16 | • | • | • | • | • | • | SF | • | • |
| 4 | Real Betis (6) | • | • | • | • | R16 | • | • | • | • | R32 | • | • | R16 | R16 | GS | • | QF | • |
| 5 | Real Sociedad (6) | • | • | • | • | • | • | • | • | R32 | • | • | R32 | KO | R16 | • | R16 | • | |
| 6 | Atlético Madrid (5) | C | GS | C | R32 | • | • | • | • | C | • | • | • | • | • | • | • | • | • |
| 7 | Valencia (5) | QF | • | SF | • | SF | • | R16 | • | • | SF | • | • | • | • | • | • | • | • |
| 8 | Celta Vigo (3) | • | • | • | • | • | • | • | SF | • | • | • | • | • | • | • | • | QF | |
| 9 | Barcelona (2) | • | • | • | • | • | • | • | • | • | • | • | • | QF | KO | • | • | • | • |
| 10 | Getafe (2) | • | GS | • | • | • | • | • | • | • | • | R16 | • | • | • | • | • | • | • |
| 11 | Granada (1) | • | • | • | • | • | • | • | • | • | • | • | QF | • | • | • | • | • | • |
| 12 | Espanyol (1) | • | • | • | • | • | • | • | • | • | • | R32 | • | • | • | • | • | • | • |
| 13 | Levante (1) | • | • | • | R16 | • | • | • | • | • | • | • | • | • | • | • | • | • | • |
| (Germany) | GERMANY (53) | (4) | (3) | (2) | (4) | (2) | (2) | (4) | (3) | (5) | (3) | (4) | (2) | (4) | (3) | (2) | (2) | (2) | (2) |
| 1 | Bayer Leverkusen (10) | • | R16 | • | R32 | • | • | R16 | • | • | R32 | QF | R32 | R16 | SF | F | • | • | |
| 2 | Eintracht Frankfurt (5) | • | • | • | • | R32 | • | • | • | • | SF | R16 | • | C | • | • | QF | • | • |
| 3 | SC Freiburg (4) | • | • | • | • | GS | • | • | • | • | • | • | • | • | R16 | R16 | • | F | • |
| 4 | Borussia Dortmund (4) | • | GS | • | • | • | • | QF | • | R16 | • | • | • | KO | • | • | • | • | • |
| 5 | Borussia Mönchengladbach (4) | • | • | • | R32 | • | R32 | • | R16 | • | • | GS | • | • | • | • | • | • | • |
| 6 | TSG Hoffenheim (4) | • | • | • | • | • | • | • | • | GS | • | • | R32 | • | • | • | LP | • | |
| 7 | RB Leipzig (3) | • | • | • | • | • | • | • | • | QF | GS | • | • | SF | • | • | • | • | • |
| 8 | Schalke 04 (3) | • | • | QF | • | • | • | R32 | QF | • | • | • | • | • | • | • | • | • | • |
| 9 | VfL Wolfsburg (3) | QF | • | • | • | • | QF | • | • | • | • | R16 | • | • | • | • | • | • | • |
| 10 | VfB Stuttgart (3) | • | R32 | • | R16 | • | • | • | • | • | • | • | • | • | • | • | • | R16 | • |
| 11 | Hannover 96 (2) | • | • | QF | R32 | • | • | • | • | • | • | • | • | • | • | • | • | • | • |
| 12 | Hertha BSC (2) | R32 | • | • | • | • | • | • | • | GS | • | • | • | • | • | • | • | • | • |
| 13 | Hamburger SV (1) | SF | • | • | • | • | • | • | • | • | • | • | • | • | • | • | • | • | • |
| 14 | 1. FC Köln (1) | • | • | • | • | • | • | • | • | GS | • | • | • | • | • | • | • | • | • |
| 15 | FC Augsburg (1) | • | • | • | • | • | • | R32 | • | • | • | • | • | • | • | • | • | • | • |
| 16 | Mainz 05 (1) | • | • | • | • | • | • | • | GS | • | • | • | • | • | • | • | • | • | • |
| 17 | Union Berlin (1) | • | • | • | • | • | • | • | • | • | • | • | • | • | R16 | • | • | • | • |
| 18 | Werder Bremen (1) | R16 | • | • | • | • | • | • | • | • | • | • | • | • | • | • | • | • | • |
| (England) | ENGLAND (52) | (3) | (2) | (6) | (4) | (3) | (3) | (3) | (3) | (2) | (2) | (3) | (4) | (2) | (2) | (3) | (2) | (2) | (3) |
| 1 | Tottenham Hotspur (8) | • | • | GS | QF | R16 | R32 | R16 | R32 | • | • | • | R16 | • | • | • | C | • | • |
| 2 | Manchester United (7) | • | • | R16 | • | • | • | R16 | C | • | • | SF | F | • | QF | • | F | • | • |
| 3 | Liverpool (6) | SF | R16 | • | R32 | • | R32 | F | • | • | • | • | • | • | • | QF | • | • | • |
| 4 | Arsenal (5) | • | • | • | • | • | • | • | • | SF | F | R32 | SF | • | R16 | • | • | • | • |
| 5 | Everton (3) | R32 | • | • | • | • | R16 | • | • | GS | • | • | • | • | • | • | • | • | • |
| 6 | Chelsea (2) | • | • | • | C | • | • | • | • | • | C | • | • | • | • | • | • | • | • |
| 7 | Fulham (2) | F | • | GS | • | • | • | • | • | • | • | • | • | • | • | • | • | • | • |
| 8 | West Ham United (2) | • | • | • | • | • | • | • | • | • | • | • | • | SF | • | QF | • | • | • |
| 9 | Leicester City (2) | • | • | • | • | • | • | • | • | • | • | • | R32 | GS | • | • | • | • | • |
| 10 | Manchester City (2) | • | R16 | R16 | • | • | • | • | • | • | • | • | • | • | • | • | • | • | • |
| 11 | Aston Villa (1) | • | • | • | • | • | • | • | • | • | • | • | • | • | • | • | • | C | • |
| 12 | Nottingham Forest (1) | • | • | • | • | • | • | • | • | • | • | • | • | • | • | • | • | SF | • |
| 13 | Newcastle United (1) | • | • | • | QF | • | • | • | • | • | • | • | • | • | • | • | • | • | • |
| 14 | Wolverhampton Wanderers (1) | • | • | • | • | • | • | • | • | • | • | QF | • | • | • | • | • | • | • |
| 15 | Birmingham City (1) | • | • | GS | • | • | • | • | • | • | • | • | • | • | • | • | • | • | • |
| 16 | Bournemouth (1) | • | • | • | • | • | • | • | • | • | • | • | • | • | • | • | • | • | |
| 17 | Brighton & Hove Albion (1) | • | • | • | • | • | • | • | • | • | • | • | • | • | • | R16 | • | • | • |
| 18 | Crystal Palace (1) | • | • | • | • | • | • | • | • | • | • | • | • | • | • | • | • | • | |
| 19 | Southampton (1) | • | • | • | • | • | • | • | GS | • | • | • | • | • | • | • | • | • | • |
| 20 | Stoke City (1) | • | • | R32 | • | • | • | • | • | • | • | • | • | • | • | • | • | • | • |
| 21 | Sunderland (1) | • | • | • | • | • | • | • | • | • | • | • | • | • | • | • | • | • | |
| 22 | Swansea City (1) (Note: Swansea City is a club based in Wales, but participates in the Europa League through the berths for England.) | • | • | • | • | R32 | • | • | • | • | • | • | • | • | • | • | • | • | • |
| 23 | Wigan Athletic (1) | • | • | • | • | GS | • | • | • | • | • | • | • | • | • | • | • | • | • |
| (Portugal) | PORTUGAL (52) | (3) | (4) | (3) | (4) | (5) | (3) | (4) | (1) | (3) | (2) | (5) | (2) | (2) | (2) | (3) | (2) | (2) | (2) |
| 1 | Braga (12) | • | F | R32 | • | • | • | QF | GS | R32 | • | R32 | R32 | QF | GS | KO | LP | SF | • |
| 2 | Sporting CP (11) | R16 | R32 | SF | GS | • | R32 | R32 | • | QF | R32 | R32 | • | • | QF | R16 | • | • | • |
| 3 | Benfica (9) | QF | SF | • | F | F | • | • | • | • | QF | R32 | R32 | • | • | QF | • | • | |
| 4 | Porto (8) | • | C | R32 | • | QF | • | R32 | • | • | • | R32 | • | R16 | • | • | KO | QF | • |
| 5 | Vitória de Guimarães (3) | • | • | • | • | GS | • | • | • | GS | • | GS | • | • | • | • | • | • | • |
| 6 | Estoril (2) | • | • | • | • | GS | GS | • | • | • | • | • | • | • | • | • | • | • | • |
| 7 | Académica (1) | • | • | • | GS | • | • | • | • | • | • | • | • | • | • | • | • | • | • |
| 8 | Belenenses (1) | • | • | • | • | • | • | GS | • | • | • | • | • | • | • | • | • | • | • |
| 9 | Marítimo (1) | • | • | • | GS | • | • | • | • | • | • | • | • | • | • | • | • | • | • |
| 10 | Nacional (1) | GS | • | • | • | • | • | • | • | • | • | • | • | • | • | • | • | • | • |
| 11 | Paços de Ferreira (1) | • | • | • | • | GS | • | • | • | • | • | • | • | • | • | • | • | • | • |
| 12 | Rio Ave (1) | • | • | • | • | • | GS | • | • | • | • | • | • | • | • | • | • | • | • |
| 13 | Torreense (1) | • | • | • | • | • | • | • | • | • | • | • | • | • | • | • | • | • | |
| (Netherlands) | NETHERLANDS (51) | (4) | (5) | (4) | (3) | (3) | (3) | (3) | (3) | (1) | (0) | (4) | (4) | (1) | (3) | (2) | (3) | (3) | (2) |
| 1 | Ajax (13) | R32 | R16 | R32 | R32 | R32 | R16 | GS | F | • | • | R32 | QF | • | KO | GS | R16 | • | • |
| 2 | PSV Eindhoven (10) | R32 | QF | R16 | GS | GS | R32 | • | • | • | • | GS | R32 | GS | KO | • | • | • | • |
| 3 | AZ (9) | • | GS | QF | • | QF | • | GS | R32 | • | • | R32 | GS | • | • | • | R16 | • | |
| 4 | Feyenoord (7) | • | • | • | • | • | R32 | • | GS | • | • | GS | GS | • | QF | KO | • | LP | • |
| 5 | Twente (5) | R32 | QF | R16 | GS | • | • | • | • | • | • | • | • | • | • | • | KO | • | • |
| 6 | Utrecht (2) | • | GS | • | • | • | • | • | • | • | • | • | • | • | • | • | • | LP | • |
| 7 | Go Ahead Eagles (1) | • | • | • | • | • | • | • | • | • | • | • | • | • | • | • | • | LP | • |
| 8 | Groningen (1) | • | • | • | • | • | • | GS | • | • | • | • | • | • | • | • | • | • | • |
| 9 | Heerenveen (1) | GS | • | • | • | • | • | • | • | • | • | • | • | • | • | • | • | • | • |
| 10 | NEC Nijmegen (1) | • | • | • | • | • | • | • | • | • | • | • | • | • | • | • | • | • | |
| 11 | Vitesse (1) | • | • | • | • | • | • | • | • | GS | • | • | • | • | • | • | • | • | • |
| (France) | FRANCE (50) | (3) | (2) | (2) | (3) | (2) | (3) | (4) | (3) | (3) | (3) | (2) | (2) | (3) | (3) | (4) | (2) | (3) | (3) |
| 1 | Marseille (8) | R16 | • | • | GS | • | • | R32 | • | F | GS | • | • | GS | • | SF | • | • | |
| 2 | Lyon (8) | • | • | • | R32 | QF | • | • | SF | R16 | • | • | • | QF | • | • | QF | R16 | |
| 3 | Rennes (6) | • | • | GS | • | • | • | • | • | • | R16 | GS | • | • | KO | KO | • | • | |
| 4 | Lille (5) | R16 | R32 | • | • | • | GS | • | • | • | • | • | R32 | • | • | • | • | R16 | • |
| 5 | Nice (5) | • | • | • | • | • | • | • | GS | R32 | • | • | GS | • | • | • | LP | LP | • |
| 6 | Bordeaux (4) | • | • | • | R16 | GS | • | GS | • | • | GS | • | • | • | • | • | • | • | • |
| 7 | Saint-Étienne (4) | • | • | • | • | • | GS | R32 | R32 | • | • | GS | • | • | • | • | • | • | • |
| 8 | Monaco (3) (Note: Monaco is a club based in Monaco (which is not a UEFA member), but participates in the Europa League through the berths for France.) | • | • | • | • | • | • | GS | • | • | • | • | • | R16 | KO | • | • | • | • |
| 9 | Paris Saint-Germain (2) | • | R16 | GS | • | • | • | • | • | • | • | • | • | • | • | • | • | • | • |
| 10 | Toulouse (2) | GS | • | • | • | • | • | • | • | • | • | • | • | • | • | KO | • | • | • |
| 11 | Guingamp (1) | • | • | • | • | • | R32 | • | • | • | • | • | • | • | • | • | • | • | • |
| 12 | Lens (1) | • | • | • | • | • | • | • | • | • | • | • | • | • | • | KO | • | • | • |
| 13 | Nantes (1) | • | • | • | • | • | • | • | • | • | • | • | • | • | KO | • | • | • | • |
| (Belgium) | BELGIUM (45) | (3) | (3) | (3) | (2) | (3) | (4) | (2) | (4) | (1) | (4) | (3) | (4) | (2) | (1) | (1) | (2) | (1) | (2) |
| 1 | Anderlecht (9) | R16 | R32 | R32 | • | • | R32 | R16 | QF | • | GS | • | • | • | • | • | KO | • | |
| 2 | Club Brugge (9) | R32 | GS | R32 | GS | • | QF | GS | • | • | R32 | R32 | R32 | • | • | • | • | • | • |
| 3 | Standard Liège (8) | QF | • | R16 | • | GS | GS | • | GS | • | GS | GS | GS | • | • | • | • | • | • |
| 4 | Genk (6) | • | • | • | R32 | R32 | • | • | QF | • | R32 | • | • | GS | • | • | • | R16 | • |
| 5 | Union Saint-Gilloise (4) | • | • | • | • | • | • | • | • | • | • | • | • | • | QF | GS | KO | • | |
| 6 | Gent (4) | • | GS | • | • | • | • | • | R16 | • | • | R32 | GS | • | • | • | • | • | • |
| 7 | Antwerp (2) | • | • | • | • | • | • | • | • | • | • | • | R32 | GS | • | • | • | • | • |
| 8 | Zulte Waregem (2) | • | • | • | • | GS | • | • | • | GS | • | • | • | • | • | • | • | • | • |
| 9 | Lokeren (1) | • | • | • | • | • | GS | • | • | • | • | • | • | • | • | • | • | • | • |
| (Greece) | GREECE (39) | (2) | (3) | (3) | (2) | (1) | (4) | (3) | (3) | (1) | (2) | (1) | (3) | (1) | (1) | (3) | (2) | (2) | (2) |
| 1 | Olympiacos (13) | • | • | R16 | R32 | • | R32 | R32 | R16 | • | R32 | R16 | R16 | KO | GS | GS | R16 | • | |
| 2 | PAOK (10) | • | R32 | R32 | • | R32 | GS | GS | R32 | • | GS | • | GS | • | • | • | KO | KO | • |
| 3 | AEK Athens (6) | GS | GS | GS | • | • | • | • | • | R32 | • | • | GS | • | • | GS | • | • | • |
| 4 | Panathinaikos (6) | R16 | • | • | GS | • | GS | • | GS | • | • | • | • | • | • | GS | • | R16 | • |
| 5 | Asteras Tripolis (2) | • | • | • | • | • | GS | GS | • | • | • | • | • | • | • | • | • | • | • |
| 6 | Aris Thessaloniki (1) | • | R32 | • | • | • | • | • | • | • | • | • | • | • | • | • | • | • | • |
| 7 | OFI Crete (1) | • | • | • | • | • | • | • | • | • | • | • | • | • | • | • | • | • | |
| (Austria) | AUSTRIA (38) | (4) | (2) | (3) | (1) | (2) | (1) | (1) | (3) | (2) | (2) | (3) | (4) | (2) | (2) | (2) | (0) | (2) | (2) |
| 1 | Red Bull Salzburg (13) | R32 | GS | R32 | • | R16 | R32 | • | GS | SF | R16 | R32 | R32 | • | KO | • | • | LP | |
| 2 | Rapid Wien (9) | GS | GS | • | GS | GS | • | R32 | GS | • | R32 | • | GS | GS | • | • | • | • | • |
| 3 | Sturm Graz (7) | GS | • | GS | • | • | • | • | • | • | • | • | • | GS | GS | GS | • | LP | |
| 4 | Austria Wien (4) | GS | • | GS | • | • | • | • | GS | GS | • | • | • | • | • | • | • | • | • |
| 5 | LASK (3) | • | • | • | • | • | • | • | • | • | • | R16 | GS | • | • | GS | • | • | • |
| 6 | Wolfsberger AC (2) | • | • | • | • | • | • | • | • | • | • | GS | R32 | • | • | • | • | • | • |
| (Russia) | RUSSIA (36) | (1) | (4) | (2) | (3) | (3) | (3) | (3) | (3) | (4) | (3) | (2) | (2) | (3) | (0) | (0) | (0) | (0) | (0) |
| 1 | Zenit Saint Petersburg (7) | • | R16 | • | R16 | • | QF | • | R32 | R16 | R16 | • | • | KO | • | • | • | • | • |
| 2 | Rubin Kazan (6) | R16 | R32 | R32 | QF | R32 | • | GS | • | • | • | • | • | • | • | • | • | • | • |
| 3 | Krasnodar (6) | • | • | • | • | • | GS | R32 | R16 | • | R16 | GS | R32 | • | • | • | • | • | • |
| 4 | CSKA Moscow (4) | • | R16 | • | • | • | • | • | • | QF | • | GS | GS | • | • | • | • | • | • |
| 5 | Spartak Moscow (4) | • | QF | • | • | • | • | • | • | R32 | GS | • | • | R16 | • | • | • | • | • |
| 6 | Lokomotiv Moscow (4) | • | • | R32 | • | • | • | R32 | • | R16 | • | • | • | GS | • | • | • | • | • |
| 7 | Anzhi Makhachkala (2) | • | • | • | R16 | R16 | • | • | • | • | • | • | • | • | • | • | • | • | • |
| 8 | Dynamo Moscow (1) | • | • | • | • | • | R16 | • | • | • | • | • | • | • | • | • | • | • | • |
| 9 | Kuban Krasnodar (1) | • | • | • | • | GS | • | • | • | • | • | • | • | • | • | • | • | • | • |
| 10 | Rostov (1) | • | • | • | • | • | • | • | R16 | • | • | • | • | • | • | • | • | • | • |
| (Turkey) | TURKEY (36) | (2) | (1) | (2) | (1) | (1) | (2) | (3) | (4) | (2) | (4) | (3) | (1) | (2) | (2) | (1) | (3) | (1) | (1) |
| 1 | Fenerbahçe (9) | R32 | • | • | SF | • | • | R16 | R32 | • | R32 | • | • | GS | R16 | • | R16 | KO | • |
| 2 | Beşiktaş (9) | • | R32 | R16 | • | • | R16 | GS | QF | • | GS | GS | • | • | • | • | LP | • | |
| 3 | Galatasaray (6) | R32 | • | • | • | • | • | R32 | • | • | R32 | • | • | R16 | • | KO | KO | • | • |
| 4 | Trabzonspor (5) | • | • | R32 | • | R32 | R32 | • | • | • | • | GS | • | • | GS | • | • | • | • |
| 5 | İstanbul Başakşehir (2) | • | • | • | • | • | • | • | • | GS | • | R16 | • | • | • | • | • | • | • |
| 6 | Konyaspor (2) | • | • | • | • | • | • | • | GS | GS | • | • | • | • | • | • | • | • | • |
| 7 | Akhisarspor (1) | • | • | • | • | • | • | • | • | • | GS | • | • | • | • | • | • | • | • |
| 8 | Osmanlıspor (1) | • | • | • | • | • | • | • | R32 | • | • | • | • | • | • | • | • | • | • |
| 9 | Sivasspor (1) | • | • | • | • | • | • | • | • | • | • | • | GS | • | • | • | • | • | • |
| (Ukraine) | UKRAINE (36) | (1) | (3) | (3) | (3) | (4) | (3) | (2) | (2) | (2) | (3) | (3) | (3) | (0) | (2) | (1) | (1) | (0) | (0) |
| 1 | Dynamo Kyiv (11) | • | QF | GS | R32 | R32 | QF | • | • | R16 | R16 | GS | R16 | • | GS | • | LP | • | • |
| 2 | Shakhtar Donetsk (9) | R32 | • | • | • | R32 | • | SF | R32 | • | R32 | SF | R16 | • | R16 | KO | • | • | • |
| 3 | Dnipro Dnipropetrovsk (4) | • | • | • | R32 | R32 | F | GS | • | • | • | • | • | • | • | • | • | • | • |
| 4 | Metalist Kharkiv (4) | • | R32 | QF | R32 | • | GS | • | • | • | • | • | • | • | • | • | • | • | • |
| 5 | Zorya Luhansk (3) | • | • | • | • | • | • | • | GS | GS | • | • | GS | • | • | • | • | • | • |
| 6 | Vorskla Poltava (2) | • | • | GS | • | • | • | • | • | • | GS | • | • | • | • | • | • | • | • |
| 7 | Chornomorets Odesa (1) | • | • | • | • | R32 | • | • | • | • | • | • | • | • | • | • | • | • | • |
| 8 | Karpaty Lviv (1) | • | GS | • | • | • | • | • | • | • | • | • | • | • | • | • | • | • | • |
| 9 | Oleksandriya (1) | • | • | • | • | • | • | • | • | • | • | GS | • | • | • | • | • | • | • |
| (Czech Republic) | CZECH REPUBLIC (32) | (2) | (1) | (1) | (2) | (2) | (1) | (3) | (3) | (3) | (3) | (0) | (3) | (1) | (0) | (2) | (2) | (1) | (2) |
| 1 | Sparta Prague (10) | GS | R32 | • | R32 | • | GS | QF | R32 | • | • | • | GS | GS | • | R16 | • | • | |
| 2 | Viktoria Plzeň (10) | • | • | R32 | R16 | R16 | • | GS | GS | R16 | R32 | • | • | • | • | • | R16 | KO | |
| 3 | Slavia Prague (6) | GS | • | • | • | • | • | • | • | GS | QF | • | QF | • | • | R16 | LP | • | • |
| 4 | Slovan Liberec (4) | • | • | • | • | R32 | • | GS | GS | • | • | • | GS | • | • | • | • | • | • |
| 5 | Jablonec (1) | • | • | • | • | • | • | • | • | • | GS | • | • | • | • | • | • | • | • |
| 6 | Zlín (1) | • | • | • | • | • | • | • | • | GS | • | • | • | • | • | • | • | • | • |
| (Switzerland) | SWITZERLAND (28) | (1) | (3) | (1) | (2) | (3) | (2) | (2) | (2) | (2) | (1) | (3) | (1) | (0) | (1) | (2) | (0) | (2) | (0) |
| 1 | Young Boys (9) | • | R32 | • | GS | • | R32 | • | GS | GS | • | GS | R16 | • | • | KO | • | LP | • |
| 2 | Basel (7) | GS | R32 | • | SF | QF | • | R16 | • | • | • | QF | • | • | • | • | • | LP | • |
| 3 | Zürich (5) | • | • | GS | • | • | GS | • | GS | • | R32 | • | • | • | GS | • | • | • | • |
| 4 | Lugano (2) | • | • | • | • | • | • | • | • | GS | • | GS | • | • | • | • | • | • | • |
| 5 | Lausanne-Sport (1) | • | GS | • | • | • | • | • | • | • | • | • | • | • | • | • | • | • | • |
| 6 | Servette (1) | • | • | • | • | • | • | • | • | • | • | • | • | • | • | GS | • | • | • |
| 7 | Sion (1) | • | • | • | • | • | • | R32 | • | • | • | • | • | • | • | • | • | • | • |
| 8 | St. Gallen (1) | • | • | • | • | GS | • | • | • | • | • | • | • | • | • | • | • | • | • |
| 9 | Thun (1) | • | • | • | • | GS | • | • | • | • | • | • | • | • | • | • | • | • | • |
| (Romania) | ROMANIA (21) | (5) | (1) | (3) | (2) | (1) | (2) | (0) | (2) | (1) | (0) | (1) | (1) | (0) | (0) | (0) | (1) | (1) | (0) |
| 1 | Steaua București (6) | GS | GS | R32 | R16 | • | GS | • | GS | • | • | • | • | • | • | • | • | • | • |
| 2 | CFR Cluj (4) | GS | • | • | R32 | • | • | • | • | • | • | R32 | GS | • | • | • | • | • | • |
| 3 | FCSB (3) | • | • | • | • | • | • | • | • | R32 | • | • | • | • | • | • | R16 | LP | • |
| 4 | Astra Giurgiu (2) | • | • | • | • | • | GS | • | R32 | • | • | • | • | • | • | • | • | • | • |
| 5 | Dinamo București (1) | GS | • | • | • | • | • | • | • | • | • | • | • | • | • | • | • | • | • |
| 6 | Pandurii Târgu Jiu (1) | • | • | • | • | GS | • | • | • | • | • | • | • | • | • | • | • | • | • |
| 7 | Rapid București (1) | • | • | GS | • | • | • | • | • | • | • | • | • | • | • | • | • | • | • |
| 8 | Timișoara (1) | GS | • | • | • | • | • | • | • | • | • | • | • | • | • | • | • | • | • |
| 9 | Unirea Urziceni (1) | R32 | • | • | • | • | • | • | • | • | • | • | • | • | • | • | • | • | • |
| 10 | Vaslui (1) | • | • | GS | • | • | • | • | • | • | • | • | • | • | • | • | • | • | • |
| (Scotland) | SCOTLAND (19) | (1) | (1) | (1) | (0) | (0) | (1) | (1) | (0) | (1) | (2) | (2) | (2) | (2) | (0) | (1) | (1) | (2) | (1) |
| 1 | Celtic (11) | GS | • | GS | • | • | R32 | GS | • | R32 | R32 | R32 | GS | GS | • | • | • | KO | |
| 2 | Rangers (8) | • | R16 | • | • | • | • | • | • | • | GS | R16 | R16 | F | • | R16 | QF | LP | • |
| (Denmark) | DENMARK (18) | (1) | (1) | (2) | (1) | (1) | (2) | (1) | (1) | (1) | (1) | (1) | (0) | (2) | (1) | (0) | (1) | (1) | (0) |
| 1 | Copenhagen (8) | R32 | • | GS | GS | • | GS | • | R16 | R32 | GS | QF | • | • | • | • | • | • | • |
| 2 | Midtjylland (5) | • | • | • | • | • | • | R32 | • | • | • | • | • | GS | KO | • | KO | R16 | • |
| 3 | Odense (2) | • | GS | GS | • | • | • | • | • | • | • | • | • | • | • | • | • | • | • |
| 4 | AaB (1) | • | • | • | • | • | R32 | • | • | • | • | • | • | • | • | • | • | • | • |
| 5 | Brøndby (1) | • | • | • | • | • | • | • | • | • | • | • | • | GS | • | • | • | • | • |
| 6 | Esbjerg (1) | • | • | • | • | R32 | • | • | • | • | • | • | • | • | • | • | • | • | • |
| (Israel) | ISRAEL (18) | (1) | (0) | (3) | (2) | (2) | (0) | (0) | (2) | (2) | (0) | (0) | (2) | (0) | (0) | (1) | (1) | (1) | (1) |
| 1 | Maccabi Tel Aviv (7) | • | • | GS | • | R32 | • | • | GS | GS | • | • | R32 | • | • | • | LP | LP | • |
| 2 | Hapoel Be'er Sheva (4) | • | • | • | • | • | • | • | R32 | GS | • | • | GS | • | • | • | • | • | |
| 3 | Hapoel Tel Aviv (3) | R32 | • | GS | GS | • | • | • | • | • | • | • | • | • | • | • | • | • | • |
| 4 | Maccabi Haifa (3) | • | • | GS | • | GS | • | • | • | • | • | • | • | • | • | GS | • | • | • |
| 5 | Ironi Kiryat Shmona (1) | • | • | • | GS | • | • | • | • | • | • | • | • | • | • | • | • | • | • |
| (Norway) | NORWAY (16) | (0) | (1) | (0) | (2) | (1) | (0) | (2) | (0) | (1) | (2) | (1) | (1) | (0) | (1) | (1) | (1) | (1) | (1) |
| 1 | Rosenborg (6) | • | GS | • | GS | • | • | GS | • | GS | GS | GS | • | • | • | • | • | • | • |
| 2 | Molde (4) | • | • | • | GS | • | • | R32 | • | • | • | • | R16 | • | • | GS | • | • | • |
| 3 | Bodø/Glimt (2) | • | • | • | • | • | • | • | • | • | • | • | • | • | GS | • | SF | • | • |
| 4 | Brann (1) | • | • | • | • | • | • | • | • | • | • | • | • | • | • | • | • | KO | • |
| 5 | Lillestrøm (1) | • | • | • | • | • | • | • | • | • | • | • | • | • | • | • | • | • | |
| 6 | Sarpsborg 08 (1) | • | • | • | • | • | • | • | • | • | GS | • | • | • | • | • | • | • | • |
| 7 | Tromsø (1) | • | • | • | • | GS | • | • | • | • | • | • | • | • | • | • | • | • | • |
| (Cyprus) | CYPRUS (16) | (0) | (0) | (1) | (1) | (2) | (1) | (1) | (1) | (1) | (2) | (1) | (1) | (0) | (2) | (1) | (0) | (0) | (1) |
| 1 | APOEL (4) | • | • | • | • | GS | • | GS | R16 | • | • | R32 | • | • | • | • | • | • | • |
| 2 | Apollon Limassol (4) | • | • | • | • | GS | GS | • | • | GS | GS | • | • | • | • | • | • | • | • |
| 3 | AEK Larnaca (3) | • | • | GS | • | • | • | • | • | • | GS | • | • | • | GS | • | • | • | • |
| 4 | Omonia (3) | • | • | • | • | • | • | • | • | • | • | • | GS | • | GS | • | • | • | |
| 5 | AEL Limassol (1) | • | • | • | GS | • | • | • | • | • | • | • | • | • | • | • | • | • | • |
| 6 | Aris Limassol (1) | • | • | • | • | • | • | • | • | • | • | • | • | • | • | GS | • | • | • |
| (Bulgaria) | BULGARIA (16) | (2) | (2) | (0) | (0) | (1) | (0) | (0) | (1) | (1) | (1) | (1) | (2) | (1) | (1) | (0) | (1) | (1) | (1) |
| 1 | Ludogorets Razgrad (10) | • | • | • | • | R16 | • | • | R32 | R32 | GS | R32 | GS | GS | GS | • | LP | KO | • |
| 2 | CSKA Sofia (3) | GS | GS | • | • | • | • | • | • | • | • | • | GS | • | • | • | • | • | • |
| 3 | Levski Sofia (3) | GS | GS | • | • | • | • | • | • | • | • | • | • | • | • | • | • | • | |
| (Croatia) | CROATIA (14) | (1) | (2) | (0) | (0) | (2) | (2) | (0) | (0) | (1) | (1) | (0) | (2) | (1) | (0) | (0) | (0) | (1) | (1) |
| 1 | Dinamo Zagreb (9) | GS | GS | • | • | GS | GS | • | • | • | R16 | • | QF | KO | • | • | • | KO | |
| 2 | Rijeka (4) | • | • | • | • | GS | GS | • | • | GS | • | • | GS | • | • | • | • | • | • |
| 3 | Hajduk Split (1) | • | GS | • | • | • | • | • | • | • | • | • | • | • | • | • | • | • | • |
| (Poland) | POLAND (13) | (0) | (1) | (2) | (0) | (1) | (1) | (2) | (1) | (0) | (0) | (0) | (1) | (1) | (0) | (1) | (0) | (0) | (2) |
| 1 | Legia Warsaw (6) | • | • | R32 | • | GS | R32 | GS | R32 | • | • | • | • | GS | • | • | • | • | • |
| 2 | Lech Poznań (4) | • | R32 | • | • | • | • | GS | • | • | • | • | GS | • | • | • | • | • | |
| 3 | Jagiellonia Białystok (1) | • | • | • | • | • | • | • | • | • | • | • | • | • | • | • | • | • | |
| 4 | Raków Częstochowa (1) | • | • | • | • | • | • | • | • | • | • | • | • | • | • | GS | • | • | • |
| 5 | Wisła Kraków (1) | • | • | R32 | • | • | • | • | • | • | • | • | • | • | • | • | • | • | • |
| (Sweden) | SWEDEN (12) | (0) | (0) | (1) | (2) | (1) | (0) | (0) | (0) | (1) | (1) | (1) | (0) | (0) | (1) | (1) | (2) | (1) | (0) |
| 1 | Malmö FF (6) | • | • | GS | • | • | • | • | • | • | R32 | R32 | • | • | GS | • | LP | LP | • |
| 2 | IF Elfsborg (2) | • | • | • | • | GS | • | • | • | • | • | • | • | • | • | • | LP | • | • |
| 3 | AIK (1) | • | • | • | GS | • | • | • | • | • | • | • | • | • | • | • | • | • | • |
| 4 | BK Häcken (1) | • | • | • | • | • | • | • | • | • | • | • | • | • | • | GS | • | • | • |
| 5 | Helsingborgs IF (1) | • | • | • | GS | • | • | • | • | • | • | • | • | • | • | • | • | • | • |
| 6 | Östersunds FK (1) | • | • | • | • | • | • | • | • | R32 | • | • | • | • | • | • | • | • | • |
| (Azerbaijan) | AZERBAIJAN (12) | (0) | (0) | (0) | (1) | (0) | (1) | (2) | (2) | (0) | (1) | (1) | (1) | (0) | (1) | (1) | (1) | (0) | (0) |
| 1 | Qarabağ (9) | • | • | • | • | • | GS | GS | GS | • | GS | GS | GS | • | GS | R16 | LP | • | • |
| 2 | Qabala (2) | • | • | • | • | • | • | GS | GS | • | • | • | • | • | • | • | • | • | • |
| 3 | Neftçi (1) | • | • | • | GS | • | • | • | • | • | • | • | • | • | • | • | • | • | • |
| (Serbia) | SERBIA (12) | (1) | (0) | (0) | (1) | (0) | (1) | (1) | (0) | (2) | (0) | (1) | (1) | (1) | (1) | (1) | (0) | (1) | (0) |
| 1 | Partizan (6) | GS | • | • | GS | • | GS | GS | • | R32 | • | GS | • | • | • | • | • | • | • |
| 2 | Red Star Belgrade (5) | • | • | • | • | • | • | • | • | R32 | • | • | R32 | R16 | GS | • | • | KO | • |
| 3 | TSC (1) | • | • | • | • | • | • | • | • | • | • | • | • | • | • | GS | • | • | • |
| (Hungary) | HUNGARY (9) | (0) | (1) | (0) | (1) | (0) | (0) | (0) | (0) | (0) | (1) | (1) | (0) | (1) | (1) | (0) | (1) | (1) | (1) |
| 1 | Ferencváros (6) | • | • | • | • | • | • | • | • | • | • | GS | • | GS | R16 | • | KO | R16 | |
| 2 | Fehérvár (2) | • | • | • | GS | • | • | • | • | • | GS | • | • | • | • | • | • | • | • |
| 3 | Debrecen (1) | • | GS | • | • | • | • | • | • | • | • | • | • | • | • | • | • | • | • |
| (Belarus) | BELARUS (7) | (1) | (1) | (0) | (1) | (0) | (1) | (1) | (0) | (1) | (1) | (0) | (0) | (0) | (0) | (0) | (0) | (0) | (0) |
| 1 | BATE Borisov (5) | GS | R32 | • | R32 | • | • | • | • | GS | R32 | • | • | • | • | • | • | • | • |
| 2 | Dinamo Minsk (2) | • | • | • | • | • | GS | GS | • | • | • | • | • | • | • | • | • | • | • |
| (Moldova) | MOLDOVA (7) | (1) | (1) | (0) | (0) | (1) | (0) | (0) | (0) | (1) | (0) | (0) | (0) | (1) | (1) | (1) | (0) | (0) | (0) |
| 1 | Sheriff Tiraspol (7) | GS | GS | • | • | GS | • | • | • | GS | • | • | • | KO | GS | GS | • | • | • |
| (Kazakhstan) | KAZAKHSTAN (5) | (0) | (0) | (0) | (0) | (1) | (0) | (0) | (1) | (1) | (1) | (1) | (0) | (0) | (0) | (0) | (0) | (0) | (0) |
| 1 | Astana (4) | • | • | • | • | • | • | • | GS | R32 | GS | GS | • | • | • | • | • | • | • |
| 2 | Shakhter Karagandy (1) | • | • | • | • | GS | • | • | • | • | • | • | • | • | • | • | • | • | • |
| (Slovakia) | SLOVAKIA (4) | (0) | (0) | (1) | (0) | (0) | (1) | (0) | (0) | (0) | (1) | (1) | (0) | (0) | (0) | (0) | (0) | (0) | (0) |
| 1 | Slovan Bratislava (3) | • | • | GS | • | • | GS | • | • | • | • | GS | • | • | • | • | • | • | • |
| 2 | Spartak Trnava (1) | • | • | • | • | • | • | • | • | • | GS | • | • | • | • | • | • | • | • |
| (Slovenia) | SLOVENIA (4) | (0) | (0) | (1) | (1) | (1) | (0) | (0) | (0) | (0) | (0) | (0) | (0) | (0) | (0) | (0) | (0) | (0) | (1) |
| 1 | Maribor (3) | • | • | GS | GS | R32 | • | • | • | • | • | • | • | • | • | • | • | • | • |
| 2 | Celje (1) | • | • | • | • | • | • | • | • | • | • | • | • | • | • | • | • | • | |
| (Republic of Ireland) | REPUBLIC OF IRELAND (3) | (0) | (0) | (1) | (0) | (0) | (0) | (0) | (1) | (0) | (0) | (0) | (1) | (0) | (0) | (0) | (0) | (0) | (0) |
| 1 | Dundalk (2) | • | • | • | • | • | • | • | GS | • | • | • | GS | • | • | • | • | • | • |
| 2 | Shamrock Rovers (1) | • | • | GS | • | • | • | • | • | • | • | • | • | • | • | • | • | • | • |
| (Latvia) | LATVIA (2) | (1) | (0) | (0) | (0) | (0) | (0) | (0) | (0) | (0) | (0) | (0) | (0) | (0) | (0) | (0) | (1) | (0) | (0) |
| 1 | RFS (1) | • | • | • | • | • | • | • | • | • | • | • | • | • | • | • | LP | • | • |
| 2 | Ventspils (1) | GS | • | • | • | • | • | • | • | • | • | • | • | • | • | • | • | • | • |
| (Albania) | ALBANIA (2) | (0) | (0) | (0) | (0) | (0) | (0) | (1) | (0) | (1) | (0) | (0) | (0) | (0) | (0) | (0) | (0) | (0) | (0) |
| 1 | Skënderbeu (2) | • | • | • | • | • | • | GS | • | GS | • | • | • | • | • | • | • | • | • |
| (Finland) | FINLAND (2) | (0) | (0) | (0) | (0) | (0) | (1) | (0) | (0) | (0) | (0) | (0) | (0) | (0) | (1) | (0) | (0) | (0) | (0) |
| 1 | HJK (2) | • | • | • | • | • | GS | • | • | • | • | • | • | • | GS | • | • | • | • |
| (Luxembourg) | LUXEMBOURG (2) | (0) | (0) | (0) | (0) | (0) | (0) | (0) | (0) | (0) | (1) | (1) | (0) | (0) | (0) | (0) | (0) | (0) | (0) |
| 1 | F91 Dudelange (2) | • | • | • | • | • | • | • | • | • | GS | GS | • | • | • | • | • | • | • |
| (Armenia) | ARMENIA (1) | (0) | (0) | (0) | (0) | (0) | (0) | (0) | (0) | (0) | (0) | (0) | (0) | (0) | (0) | (0) | (0) | (0) | (1) |
| 1 | Ararat-Armenia (1) | • | • | • | • | • | • | • | • | • | • | • | • | • | • | • | • | • | |
| (North Macedonia) | NORTH MACEDONIA (1) | (0) | (0) | (0) | (0) | (0) | (0) | (0) | (0) | (1) | (0) | (0) | (0) | (0) | (0) | (0) | (0) | (0) | (0) |
| 1 | Vardar (1) | • | • | • | • | • | • | • | • | GS | • | • | • | • | • | • | • | • | • |

== UEFA Cup performance (1999–2009) ==
Countries are ranked by total number of participations, then by the number of different participating clubs, and then alphabetically. Clubs are ranked by number of participations, then by titles, runner-up finishes, semi-final appearances, quarter-final appearances, and finally alphabetically.

| # | Clubs (# of participations) | 99–00 | 00–01 | 01–02 | 02–03 | 03–04 | 04–05 | 05–06 | 06–07 | 07–08 | 08–09 |
|---|---|---|---|---|---|---|---|---|---|---|---|
| (France) | FRANCE (55) | (5) | (3) | (7) | (6) | (5) | (4) | (7) | (6) | (6) | (6) |
| 1 | Bordeaux (7) | • | R16 | R32 | R32 | QF | • | • | R32 | R32 | R32 |
| 2 | Lens (6) | SF | • | • | R32 | 2R | • | R32 | R16 | 1R | • |
| 3 | Marseille (5) | • | • | • | • | F | • | R16 | 1R | R16 | QF |
| 4 | Auxerre (5) | • | • | • | R16 | R16 | QF | 1R | GS | • | • |
| 5 | Paris Saint-Germain (4) | • | • | R32 | R32 | • | • | • | R16 | • | QF |
| 6 | Lille (3) | • | • | R16 | • | • | R16 | R16 | • | • | • |
| 7 | Lyon (3) | R32 | • | R16 | R32 | • | • | • | • | • | • |
| 8 | Rennes (3) | • | • | • | • | • | • | GS | • | GS | 1R |
| 9 | Sochaux (3) | • | • | • | • | R32 | R32 | • | • | 1R | • |
| 10 | Monaco (2) | R16 | • | • | • | • | • | R32 | • | • | • |
| 11 | Nancy (2) | • | • | • | • | • | • | • | R32 | • | GS |
| 12 | Nantes (2) | R32 | R16 | • | • | • | • | • | • | • | • |
| 13 | Strasbourg (2) | • | • | 1R | • | • | • | R16 | • | • | • |
| 14 | Châteauroux (1) | • | • | • | • | • | 1R | • | • | • | • |
| 15 | Gueugnon (1) | • | 1R | • | • | • | • | • | • | • | • |
| 16 | Lorient (1) | • | • | • | 1R | • | • | • | • | • | • |
| 17 | Montpellier (1) | 2R | • | • | • | • | • | • | • | • | • |
| 18 | Saint-Étienne (1) | • | • | • | • | • | • | • | • | • | R16 |
| 19 | Sedan (1) | • | • | 1R | • | • | • | • | • | • | • |
| 20 | Toulouse (1) | • | • | • | • | • | • | • | • | GS | • |
| 21 | Troyes (1) | • | • | 2R | • | • | • | • | • | • | • |
| (Germany) | GERMANY (52) | (5) | (7) | (4) | (4) | (5) | (4) | (6) | (5) | (5) | (7) |
| 1 | Hertha BSC (7) | • | R32 | R32 | R16 | 1R | • | R32 | 1R | • | GS |
| 2 | Werder Bremen (6) | QF | R32 | • | 2R | • | • | • | SF | R16 | F |
| 3 | Schalke 04 (6) | • | • | • | R32 | 2R | R32 | SF | 1R | • | GS |
| 4 | Hamburger SV (5) | • | R32 | • | • | 1R | • | R16 | • | R16 | SF |
| 5 | Bayer Leverkusen (5) | R32 | R32 | • | • | • | • | 1R | QF | QF | • |
| 6 | VfB Stuttgart (5) | • | R16 | • | R16 | • | R32 | R32 | • | • | R32 |
| 7 | Borussia Dortmund (4) | R16 | • | F | • | 2R | • | • | • | • | 1R |
| 8 | 1. FC Kaiserslautern (3) | R32 | SF | • | • | 1R | • | • | • | • | • |
| 9 | VfL Wolfsburg (2) | R32 | • | • | • | • | • | • | • | • | R32 |
| 10 | Bayern Munich (1) | • | • | • | • | • | • | • | • | SF | • |
| 11 | 1. FC Nürnberg (1) | • | • | • | • | • | • | • | • | R32 | • |
| 12 | 1860 Munich (1) | • | R32 | • | • | • | • | • | • | • | • |
| 13 | Alemannia Aachen (1) | • | • | • | • | • | R32 | • | • | • | • |
| 14 | Eintracht Frankfurt (1) | • | • | • | • | • | • | • | GS | • | • |
| 15 | Mainz 05 (1) | • | • | • | • | • | • | 1R | • | • | • |
| 16 | SC Freiburg (1) | • | • | R32 | • | • | • | • | • | • | • |
| 17 | Union Berlin (1) | • | • | 2R | • | • | • | • | • | • | • |
| 18 | VfL Bochum (1) | • | • | • | • | • | 1R | • | • | • | • |
| (Netherlands) | NETHERLANDS (47) | (3) | (5) | (6) | (3) | (5) | (5) | (4) | (5) | (6) | (5) |
| 1 | Feyenoord (7) | • | R32 | C | • | 2R | R32 | 1R | R32 | • | GS |
| 2 | Ajax (7) | R32 | 2R | 2R | • | • | R32 | • | R32 | 1R | R16 |
| 3 | Heerenveen (6) | • | • | • | 1R | • | R32 | R32 | GS | 1R | GS |
| 4 | AZ (4) | • | • | • | • | • | SF | R32 | QF | GS | • |
| 5 | PSV Eindhoven (4) | • | QF | QF | • | QF | • | • | • | QF | • |
| 6 | Utrecht (4) | • | • | 2R | 1R | 2R | GS | • | • | • | • |
| 7 | Roda JC (3) | 2R | 1R | R16 | • | • | • | • | • | • | • |
| 8 | Vitesse (3) | 2R | 2R | • | R32 | • | • | • | • | • | • |
| 9 | Groningen (2) | • | • | • | • | • | • | • | 1R | 1R | • |
| 10 | NAC Breda (2) | • | • | 2R | • | 1R | • | • | • | • | • |
| 11 | NEC Nijmegen (2) | • | • | • | • | 1R | • | • | • | • | R32 |
| 12 | Twente (2) | • | • | • | • | • | • | • | • | 1R | R32 |
| 13 | Willem II (1) | • | • | • | • | • | • | 1R | • | • | • |
| (Spain) | SPAIN (43) | (4) | (6) | (4) | (4) | (4) | (5) | (4) | (4) | (4) | (4) |
| 1 | Celta Vigo (5) | QF | QF | 2R | R32 | • | • | • | R16 | • | • |
| 2 | Sevilla (4) | • | • | • | • | • | R16 | C | C | • | GS |
| 3 | Valencia (4) | • | • | QF | • | C | R32 | • | • | • | R32 |
| 4 | Real Zaragoza (4) | • | 1R | 2R | • | • | R16 | • | • | 1R | • |
| 5 | Espanyol (3) | • | R32 | • | • | • | • | R32 | F | • | • |
| 6 | Villarreal (3) | • | • | • | • | SF | QF | • | • | R32 | • |
| 7 | Mallorca (3) | QF | • | R32 | • | R16 | • | • | • | • | • |
| 8 | Alavés (2) | • | F | • | 2R | • | • | • | • | • | • |
| 9 | Barcelona (2) | • | SF | • | • | R16 | • | • | • | • | • |
| 10 | Osasuna (2) | • | • | • | • | • | • | 1R | SF | • | • |
| 11 | Atlético Madrid (2) | R16 | • | • | • | • | • | • | • | R32 | • |
| 12 | Deportivo La Coruña (2) | R16 | • | • | • | • | • | • | • | • | R32 |
| 13 | Real Betis (2) | • | • | • | R32 | • | • | R16 | • | • | • |
| 14 | Getafe (1) | • | • | • | • | • | • | • | • | QF | • |
| 15 | Málaga (1) | • | • | • | QF | • | • | • | • | • | • |
| 16 | Rayo Vallecano (1) | • | QF | • | • | • | • | • | • | • | • |
| 17 | Athletic Bilbao (1) | • | • | • | • | • | R32 | • | • | • | • |
| 18 | Racing Santander (1) | • | • | • | • | • | • | • | • | • | GS |
| (Greece) | GREECE (43) | (6) | (5) | (2) | (5) | (4) | (6) | (4) | (5) | (5) | (1) |
| 1 | AEK Athens (8) | R32 | R16 | R16 | R16 | • | GS | 1R | R32 | R32 | • |
| 2 | PAOK (7) | 2R | R32 | R32 | R32 | 2R | 1R | GS | • | • | • |
| 3 | Panathinaikos (6) | R32 | • | • | QF | R32 | R32 | • | R32 | R32 | • |
| 4 | Aris Thessaloniki (4) | 2R | • | • | • | 2R | • | 1R | • | GS | • |
| 5 | Olympiacos (4) | R32 | R32 | • | • | • | R16 | • | • | • | R32 |
| 6 | Iraklis (3) | • | 2R | • | 1R | • | • | • | 1R | • | • |
| 7 | Panionios (3) | • | • | • | • | 2R | GS | • | • | GS | • |
| 8 | Skoda Xanthi (3) | • | • | • | 1R | • | • | 1R | 1R | • | • |
| 9 | Atromitos (1) | • | • | • | • | • | • | • | 1R | • | • |
| 10 | Egaleo (1) | • | • | • | • | • | GS | • | • | • | • |
| 11 | Ionikos (1) | 1R | • | • | • | • | • | • | • | • | • |
| 12 | AEL Larissa (1) | • | • | • | • | • | • | • | • | GS | • |
| 13 | OFI Crete (1) | • | 2R | • | • | • | • | • | • | • | • |
| (England) | ENGLAND (42) | (5) | (3) | (4) | (6) | (5) | (3) | (3) | (4) | (4) | (5) |
| 1 | Newcastle United (4) | R32 | • | • | • | SF | QF | • | R16 | • | • |
| 2 | Tottenham Hotspur (4) | 2R | • | • | • | • | • | • | QF | R16 | R32 |
| 3 | Blackburn Rovers (4) | • | • | • | 2R | 1R | • | • | R32 | 1R | • |
| 4 | Liverpool (3) | • | C | • | QF | R16 | • | • | • | • | • |
| 5 | Leeds United (3) | SF | • | R16 | R32 | • | • | • | • | • | • |
| 6 | Chelsea (3) | • | 1R | 2R | 1R | • | • | • | • | • | • |
| 7 | Everton (3) | • | • | • | • | • | • | 1R | • | R16 | 1R |
| 8 | Middlesbrough (2) | • | • | • | • | • | R16 | F | • | • | • |
| 9 | Manchester City (2) | • | • | • | • | 2R | • | • | • | • | QF |
| 10 | Aston Villa (2) | • | • | 1R | • | • | • | • | • | • | R32 |
| 11 | Bolton Wanderers (2) | • | • | • | • | • | • | R32 | • | R16 | • |
| 12 | Ipswich Town (2) | • | • | R32 | 2R | • | • | • | • | • | • |
| 13 | West Ham United (2) | 2R | • | • | • | • | • | • | 1R | • | • |
| 14 | Arsenal (1) | F | • | • | • | • | • | • | • | • | • |
| 15 | Fulham (1) | • | • | • | R32 | • | • | • | • | • | • |
| 16 | Leicester City (1) | • | 1R | • | • | • | • | • | • | • | • |
| 17 | Millwall (1) | • | • | • | • | • | 1R | • | • | • | • |
| 18 | Portsmouth (1) | • | • | • | • | • | • | • | • | • | GS |
| 19 | Southampton (1) | • | • | • | • | 1R | • | • | • | • | • |
| (Italy) | ITALY (42) | (5) | (5) | (4) | (3) | (5) | (3) | (4) | (4) | (4) | (5) |
| 1 | Parma (7) | R16 | R16 | R16 | 2R | R32 | SF | • | R32 | • | • |
| 2 | Udinese (6) | R16 | 2R | • | • | 1R | 1R | R16 | • | • | QF |
| 3 | Fiorentina (4) | • | 1R | R32 | • | • | • | • | • | SF | R32 |
| 4 | Roma (4) | R16 | R16 | • | • | R16 | • | R16 | • | • | • |
| 5 | Inter Milan (3) | • | R16 | SF | • | QF | • | • | • | • | • |
| 6 | Palermo (3) | • | • | • | • | • | • | R16 | GS | 1R | • |
| 7 | Sampdoria (3) | • | • | • | • | • | • | GS | • | 1R | R32 |
| 8 | Lazio (2) | • | • | • | SF | • | GS | • | • | • | • |
| 9 | Milan (2) | • | • | SF | • | • | • | • | • | • | R32 |
| 10 | Chievo (2) | • | • | • | 1R | • | • | • | 1R | • | • |
| 11 | Bologna (1) | R32 | • | • | • | • | • | • | • | • | • |
| 12 | Empoli (1) | • | • | • | • | • | • | • | • | 1R | • |
| 13 | Juventus (1) | R16 | • | • | • | • | • | • | • | • | • |
| 14 | Livorno (1) | • | • | • | • | • | • | • | R32 | • | • |
| 15 | Napoli (1) | • | • | • | • | • | • | • | • | • | 1R |
| 16 | Perugia (1) | • | • | • | • | R32 | • | • | • | • | • |
| (Portugal) | PORTUGAL (40) | (4) | (3) | (2) | (4) | (3) | (5) | (4) | (4) | (6) | (5) |
| 1 | Sporting CP (7) | 1R | • | R32 | 1R | 2R | F | 1R | • | QF | • |
| 2 | Benfica (7) | R32 | 1R | • | • | R16 | R32 | • | QF | R16 | GS |
| 3 | Braga (5) | • | • | • | • | • | 1R | 1R | R16 | R32 | R16 |
| 4 | Vitória de Setúbal (4) | 1R | • | • | • | • | • | 1R | 1R | • | 1R |
| 5 | Marítimo (3) | • | • | 1R | • | • | 1R | • | • | • | 1R |
| 6 | Porto (2) | • | QF | • | C | • | • | • | • | • | • |
| 7 | Boavista (2) | • | 2R | • | SF | • | • | • | • | • | • |
| 8 | Nacional (2) | • | • | • | • | • | 1R | • | 1R | • | • |
| 9 | União de Leiria (2) | • | • | • | • | 1R | • | • | • | 1R | • |
| 10 | Vitória de Guimarães (2) | • | • | • | • | • | • | GS | • | • | 1R |
| 11 | Beira-Mar (1) | 1R | • | • | • | • | • | • | • | • | • |
| 12 | Belenenses (1) | • | • | • | • | • | • | • | • | 1R | • |
| 13 | Leixões (1) | • | • | • | 1R | • | • | • | • | • | • |
| 14 | Paços de Ferreira (1) | • | • | • | • | • | • | • | • | 1R | • |
| (Denmark) | DENMARK (36) | (4) | (4) | (4) | (4) | (5) | (1) | (3) | (3) | (4) | (4) |
| 1 | Brøndby (8) | 1R | 1R | R32 | 1R | R32 | • | GS | 1R | • | 1R |
| 2 | Copenhagen (6) | • | • | R32 | 1R | 2R | • | 1R | • | GS | R32 |
| 3 | AaB (4) | 1R | • | • | • | • | 1R | • | • | GS | R16 |
| 4 | Midtjylland (4) | • | • | 1R | 2R | • | • | 1R | • | 1R | • |
| 5 | Odense (4) | • | • | • | 1R | 1R | • | • | GS | 1R | • |
| 6 | AB (2) | 1R | 1R | • | • | • | • | • | • | • | • |
| 7 | Nordsjælland (2) | • | • | • | • | 1R | • | • | • | • | 1R |
| 8 | Esbjerg (1) | • | • | • | • | 1R | • | • | • | • | • |
| 9 | Herfølge (1) | • | 2R | • | • | • | • | • | • | • | • |
| 10 | Lyngby (1) | 1R | • | • | • | • | • | • | • | • | • |
| 11 | Randers (1) | • | • | • | • | • | • | • | 1R | • | • |
| 12 | Silkeborg (1) | • | • | 1R | • | • | • | • | • | • | • |
| 13 | Viborg (1) | • | 2R | • | • | • | • | • | • | • | • |
| (Russia) | RUSSIA (35) | (3) | (5) | (5) | (2) | (2) | (3) | (4) | (4) | (3) | (4) |
| 1 | Zenit Saint Petersburg (6) | 1R | • | • | 1R | • | GS | QF | • | C | R16 |
| 2 | CSKA Moscow (6) | • | 1R | • | 1R | • | C | GS | R32 | • | R16 |
| 3 | Lokomotiv Moscow (6) | 2R | R32 | R32 | • | • | • | R32 | 1R | GS | • |
| 4 | Spartak Moscow (5) | R32 | • | • | • | R32 | • | • | R32 | R32 | GS |
| 5 | Torpedo Moscow (3) | • | 1R | 1R | • | 2R | • | • | • | • | • |
| 6 | Dynamo Moscow (2) | • | 1R | 2R | • | • | • | • | • | • | • |
| 7 | Alania Vladikavkaz (1) | • | 1R | • | • | • | • | • | • | • | • |
| 8 | Anzhi Makhachkala (1) | • | • | 1R | • | • | • | • | • | • | • |
| 9 | Chernomorets Novorossiysk (1) | • | • | 1R | • | • | • | • | • | • | • |
| 10 | Krylia Sovetov Samara (1) | • | • | • | • | • | • | 1R | • | • | • |
| 11 | Moscow (1) | • | • | • | • | • | • | • | • | • | 1R |
| 12 | Rubin Kazan (1) | • | • | • | • | • | • | • | 1R | • | • |
| 13 | Terek Grozny (1) | • | • | • | • | • | 1R | • | • | • | • |
| (Turkey) | TURKEY (33) | (3) | (2) | (2) | (5) | (6) | (4) | (2) | (4) | (2) | (3) |
| 1 | Beşiktaş (6) | • | • | • | QF | R32 | GS | GS | GS | • | 1R |
| 2 | Galatasaray (5) | C | • | • | • | R32 | • | 1R | • | R32 | R16 |
| 3 | Fenerbahçe (4) | 1R | • | • | 2R | • | R32 | • | R32 | • | • |
| 4 | Gaziantepspor (3) | • | 1R | 1R | • | R32 | • | • | • | • | • |
| 5 | Gençlerbirliği (3) | • | • | 1R | • | R16 | 1R | • | • | • | • |
| 6 | Trabzonspor (3) | • | • | • | • | 1R | 1R | • | 1R | • | • |
| 7 | Ankaragücü (2) | 1R | • | • | 1R | • | • | • | • | • | • |
| 8 | Kayserispor (2) | • | • | • | • | • | • | • | 1R | • | 1R |
| 9 | Antalyaspor (1) | • | 1R | • | • | • | • | • | • | • | • |
| 10 | Denizlispor (1) | • | • | • | R16 | • | • | • | • | • | • |
| 11 | Kayseri Erciyesspor (1) | • | • | • | • | • | • | • | • | 1R | • |
| 12 | Kocaelispor (1) | • | • | • | 1R | • | • | • | • | • | • |
| 13 | Malatyaspor (1) | • | • | • | • | 1R | • | • | • | • | • |
| (Czech Republic) | CZECH REPUBLIC (33) | (3) | (3) | (5) | (4) | (3) | (2) | (3) | (4) | (3) | (3) |
| 1 | Slavia Prague (9) | QF | R16 | 1R | R16 | 2R | • | R32 | 1R | R32 | GS |
| 2 | Slovan Liberec (4) | • | 2R | QF | R32 | • | • | • | GS | • | • |
| 3 | Sparta Prague (4) | • | • | • | 2R | • | • | • | GS | GS | 1R |
| 4 | Baník Ostrava (3) | • | • | • | • | • | 1R | 1R | • | • | 1R |
| 5 | Sigma Olomouc (3) | 1R | • | 1R | • | • | 1R | • | • | • | • |
| 6 | Teplice (3) | 2R | • | • | • | R32 | • | 1R | • | • | • |
| 7 | Viktoria Žižkov (3) | • | • | 1R | 2R | 1R | • | • | • | • | • |
| 8 | Mladá Boleslav (2) | • | • | • | • | • | • | • | GS | GS | • |
| 9 | Drnovice (1) | • | 1R | • | • | • | • | • | • | • | • |
| 10 | Marila Příbram (1) | • | • | 2R | • | • | • | • | • | • | • |
| (Austria) | AUSTRIA (32) | (4) | (3) | (4) | (4) | (4) | (3) | (2) | (3) | (3) | (2) |
| 1 | Austria Wien (7) | • | • | • | 2R | 1R | QF | 1R | GS | GS | 1R |
| 2 | Grazer AK (7) | 2R | 2R | 1R | 1R | 1R | R32 | 1R | • | • | • |
| 3 | Rapid Wien (5) | 1R | 2R | 2R | • | • | 1R | • | • | 1R | • |
| 4 | Red Bull Salzburg (4) | • | • | • | • | 2R | • | • | 1R | 1R | 1R |
| 5 | Kärnten (3) | • | • | 1R | 1R | 1R | • | • | • | • | • |
| 6 | Sturm Graz (2) | R32 | • | • | R32 | • | • | • | • | • | • |
| 7 | Tirol Innsbruck (2) | • | 2R | 2R | • | • | • | • | • | • | • |
| 8 | LASK (1) | 1R | • | • | • | • | • | • | • | • | • |
| 9 | Superfund (1) | • | • | • | • | • | • | • | 1R | • | • |
| (Ukraine) | UKRAINE (31) | (3) | (3) | (3) | (4) | (3) | (4) | (3) | (3) | (2) | (3) |
| 1 | Shakhtar Donetsk (9) | 1R | R32 | 1R | 1R | 1R | R16 | R32 | R16 | • | C |
| 2 | Dnipro Dnipropetrovsk (5) | • | • | 1R | • | R32 | R32 | GS | • | 1R | • |
| 3 | Metalurh Donetsk (4) | • | • | • | 1R | 1R | 1R | 1R | • | • | • |
| 4 | Dynamo Kyiv (3) | • | • | • | R32 | • | R32 | • | • | • | SF |
| 5 | Kryvbas Kryvyi Rih (2) | 1R | 1R | • | • | • | • | • | • | • | • |
| 6 | Metalist Kharkiv (2) | • | • | • | • | • | • | • | • | 1R | R16 |
| 7 | Metalurh Zaporizhzhia (2) | • | • | • | 1R | • | • | • | 1R | • | • |
| 8 | Chornomorets Odesa (1) | • | • | • | • | • | • | • | 1R | • | • |
| 9 | CSKA Kyiv (1) | • | • | 2R | • | • | • | • | • | • | • |
| 10 | Karpaty Lviv (1) | 1R | • | • | • | • | • | • | • | • | • |
| 11 | Vorskla Poltava (1) | • | 1R | • | • | • | • | • | • | • | • |
| (Belgium) | BELGIUM (30) | (3) | (4) | (3) | (3) | (3) | (3) | (3) | (3) | (3) | (2) |
| 1 | Club Brugge (10) | 1R | R32 | R32 | R32 | R16 | GS | R32 | GS | 1R | GS |
| 2 | Standard Liège (5) | • | • | 2R | • | • | GS | • | 1R | 1R | R32 |
| 3 | Anderlecht (3) | 2R | • | • | R16 | • | • | • | • | R16 | • |
| 4 | Genk (2) | • | 2R | • | • | • | • | 1R | • | • | • |
| 5 | Lierse (2) | 1R | 1R | • | • | • | • | • | • | • | • |
| 6 | Beveren (1) | • | • | • | • | • | GS | • | • | • | • |
| 7 | Gent (1) | • | 1R | • | • | • | • | • | • | • | • |
| 8 | Germinal Beerschot (1) | • | • | • | • | • | • | 1R | • | • | • |
| 9 | La Louvière (1) | • | • | • | • | 1R | • | • | • | • | • |
| 10 | Lokeren (1) | • | • | • | • | 1R | • | • | • | • | • |
| 11 | Mouscron (1) | • | • | • | 1R | • | • | • | • | • | • |
| 12 | Westerlo (1) | • | • | 1R | • | • | • | • | • | • | • |
| 13 | Zulte Waregem (1) | • | • | • | • | • | • | • | R32 | • | • |
| (Norway) | NORWAY (30) | (3) | (4) | (2) | (2) | (4) | (3) | (5) | (2) | (3) | (2) |
| 1 | Rosenborg (5) | • | R32 | • | • | R32 | • | R32 | • | R32 | GS |
| 2 | Brann (4) | • | 1R | • | • | • | • | 1R | • | R32 | 1R |
| 3 | Viking (4) | 2R | • | 2R | 2R | • | • | GS | • | • | • |
| 4 | Molde (3) | • | 1R | • | • | 2R | • | • | 1R | • | • |
| 5 | Stabæk (3) | 1R | • | • | 1R | • | 1R | • | • | • | • |
| 6 | Vålerenga (3) | • | • | • | • | R32 | • | 1R | • | 1R | • |
| 7 | Bodø/Glimt (2) | 1R | • | • | • | • | 1R | • | • | • | • |
| 8 | Odd (2) | • | • | 1R | • | • | 1R | • | • | • | • |
| 9 | Lillestrøm (1) | • | 2R | • | • | • | • | • | • | • | • |
| 10 | Lyn (1) | • | • | • | • | 1R | • | • | • | • | • |
| 11 | Start (1) | • | • | • | • | • | • | • | 1R | • | • |
| 12 | Tromsø (1) | • | • | • | • | • | • | GS | • | • | • |
| (Switzerland) | SWITZERLAND (30) | (4) | (4) | (3) | (2) | (3) | (1) | (4) | (3) | (3) | (3) |
| 1 | Basel (6) | • | 2R | • | • | 2R | R32 | QF | GS | R32 | • |
| 2 | Grasshopper (6) | 2R | • | R32 | 2R | 1R | • | GS | GS | • | • |
| 3 | Zürich (5) | 2R | 1R | • | • | • | • | 1R | • | R32 | 1R |
| 4 | Servette (3) | 1R | • | R16 | 1R | • | • | • | • | • | • |
| 5 | Lausanne-Sport (2) | 1R | R32 | • | • | • | • | • | • | • | • |
| 6 | Sion (2) | • | • | • | • | • | • | • | 1R | 1R | • |
| 7 | St. Gallen (2) | • | 2R | 2R | • | • | • | • | • | • | • |
| 8 | Bellinzona (1) | • | • | • | • | • | • | • | • | • | 1R |
| 9 | Neuchâtel Xamax (1) | • | • | • | • | 1R | • | • | • | • | • |
| 10 | Thun (1) | • | • | • | • | • | • | R32 | • | • | • |
| 11 | Young Boys (1) | • | • | • | • | • | • | • | • | • | 1R |
| (Bulgaria) | BULGARIA (28) | (2) | (2) | (3) | (3) | (2) | (3) | (4) | (3) | (3) | (3) |
| 1 | CSKA Sofia (9) | 1R | 1R | 2R | 1R | 1R | 1R | GS | 1R | 1R | • |
| 2 | Levski Sofia (7) | 2R | • | 1R | 2R | R32 | 1R | QF | • | • | 1R |
| 3 | Litex Lovech (7) | • | • | R32 | 1R | • | 1R | R32 | 1R | 1R | 1R |
| 4 | Lokomotiv Sofia (2) | • | • | • | • | • | • | • | 1R | 1R | • |
| 5 | Cherno More (1) | • | • | • | • | • | • | • | • | • | 1R |
| 6 | Lokomotiv Plovdiv (1) | • | • | • | • | • | • | 1R | • | • | • |
| 7 | Neftochimic Burgas (1) | • | 1R | • | • | • | • | • | • | • | • |
| (Poland) | POLAND (27) | (4) | (4) | (3) | (4) | (2) | (3) | (2) | (2) | (1) | (2) |
| 1 | Wisła Kraków (8) | • | 2R | 2R | R16 | 2R | 1R | 1R | GS | • | 1R |
| 2 | Legia Warsaw (5) | 2R | • | 2R | 2R | • | 1R | • | 1R | • | • |
| 3 | Amica Wronki (4) | 2R | 2R | • | 2R | • | GS | • | • | • | • |
| 4 | Groclin Grodzisk Wielkopolski (3) | • | • | • | • | R32 | • | 1R | • | 1R | • |
| 5 | Polonia Warsaw (3) | • | 1R | 1R | 1R | • | • | • | • | • | • |
| 6 | Lech Poznań (2) | 1R | • | • | • | • | • | • | • | • | R32 |
| 7 | Ruch Chorzów (1) | • | 1R | • | • | • | • | • | • | • | • |
| 8 | Widzew Łódź (1) | 2R | • | • | • | • | • | • | • | • | • |
| (Scotland) | SCOTLAND (26) | (4) | (3) | (4) | (4) | (3) | (2) | (1) | (2) | (2) | (1) |
| 1 | Rangers (7) | R32 | R32 | R16 | 1R | • | GS | • | R16 | F | • |
| 2 | Celtic (5) | 2R | 2R | R32 | F | QF | • | • | • | • | • |
| 3 | Heart of Midlothian (4) | • | 1R | • | • | 2R | GS | • | 1R | • | • |
| 4 | Aberdeen (2) | • | • | • | 1R | • | • | • | • | R32 | • |
| 5 | Hibernian (2) | • | • | 1R | • | • | • | 1R | • | • | • |
| 6 | Kilmarnock (2) | 1R | • | 1R | • | • | • | • | • | • | • |
| 7 | Dundee (1) | • | • | • | • | 1R | • | • | • | • | • |
| 8 | Livingston (1) | • | • | • | 1R | • | • | • | • | • | • |
| 9 | Motherwell (1) | • | • | • | • | • | • | • | • | • | 1R |
| 10 | St Johnstone (1) | 1R | • | • | • | • | • | • | • | • | • |
| (Romania) | ROMANIA (26) | (2) | (1) | (4) | (2) | (2) | (2) | (3) | (3) | (2) | (5) |
| 1 | Dinamo București (8) | 1R | • | 1R | • | 2R | 1R | GS | R32 | 1R | 1R |
| 2 | Rapid București (7) | • | 1R | 1R | 1R | • | • | QF | GS | 1R | 1R |
| 3 | Steaua București (6) | R32 | • | 1R | • | 2R | R16 | SF | R32 | • | • |
| 4 | Brașov (1) | • | • | 1R | • | • | • | • | • | • | • |
| 5 | Național București (1) | • | • | • | 2R | • | • | • | • | • | • |
| 6 | Timișoara (1) | • | • | • | • | • | • | • | • | • | 1R |
| 7 | Unirea Urziceni (1) | • | • | • | • | • | • | • | • | • | 1R |
| 8 | Vaslui (1) | • | • | • | • | • | • | • | • | • | 1R |
| (Sweden) | SWEDEN (25) | (2) | (4) | (3) | (2) | (2) | (3) | (2) | (1) | (5) | (1) |
| 1 | AIK (4) | • | 1R | • | 1R | 1R | • | • | • | 1R | • |
| 2 | Halmstads BK (3) | • | 2R | 2R | • | • | • | GS | • | • | • |
| 3 | Helsingborgs IF (3) | 2R | • | 2R | • | • | • | • | • | R32 | • |
| 4 | IF Elfsborg (3) | • | • | 1R | • | • | 1R | • | • | GS | • |
| 5 | Djurgårdens IF (2) | • | • | • | 2R | • | 1R | • | • | • | • |
| 6 | Hammarby IF (2) | • | • | • | • | • | 1R | • | • | 1R | • |
| 7 | Malmö FF (2) | • | • | • | • | 1R | • | 1R | • | • | • |
| 8 | Åtvidabergs FF (1) | • | • | • | • | • | • | • | 1R | • | • |
| 9 | BK Häcken (1) | • | • | • | • | • | • | • | • | 1R | • |
| 10 | IFK Göteborg (1) | 2R | • | • | • | • | • | • | • | • | • |
| 11 | IFK Norrköping (1) | • | 1R | • | • | • | • | • | • | • | • |
| 12 | Kalmar FF (1) | • | • | • | • | • | • | • | • | • | 1R |
| 13 | Örgryte IS (1) | • | 1R | • | • | • | • | • | • | • | • |
| (Serbia) | SERBIA (23) | (3) | (3) | (3) | (3) | (2) | (2) | (2) | (2) | (1) | (2) |
| 1 | Red Star Belgrade (9) | 1R | 2R | 1R | 2R | 2R | 1R | GS | 1R | GS | • |
| 2 | Partizan (8) | 1R | 1R | 1R | 2R | • | R16 | 1R | GS | • | GS |
| 3 | Sartid Smederevo (2) | • | • | • | 1R | 1R | • | • | • | • | • |
| 4 | Borac Čačak (1) | • | • | • | • | • | • | • | • | • | 1R |
| 5 | Napredak Kruševac (1) | • | 1R | • | • | • | • | • | • | • | • |
| 6 | Obilić (1) | • | • | 1R | • | • | • | • | • | • | • |
| 7 | Vojvodina (1) | 1R | • | • | • | • | • | • | • | • | • |
| (Slovakia) | SLOVAKIA (21) | (3) | (3) | (4) | (1) | (3) | (1) | (1) | (2) | (1) | (2) |
| 1 | Artmedia Petržalka (5) | • | • | • | • | 1R | • | R32 | 1R | 1R | 1R |
| 2 | Inter Bratislava (3) | 2R | 2R | 1R | • | • | • | • | • | • | • |
| 3 | Matador Púchov (3) | • | • | 1R | 1R | 1R | • | • | • | • | • |
| 4 | Dukla Banská Bystrica (2) | 1R | • | • | • | • | 1R | • | • | • | • |
| 5 | Ružomberok (2) | • | • | 1R | • | • | • | • | 1R | • | • |
| 6 | Slovan Bratislava (2) | • | 1R | 1R | • | • | • | • | • | • | • |
| 7 | Žilina (2) | • | • | • | • | 1R | • | • | • | • | GS |
| 8 | Košice (1) | • | 1R | • | • | • | • | • | • | • | • |
| 9 | Spartak Trnava (1) | 1R | • | • | • | • | • | • | • | • | • |
| (Israel) | ISRAEL (21) | (3) | (2) | (2) | (3) | (3) | (3) | (1) | (2) | (1) | (1) |
| 1 | Hapoel Tel Aviv (7) | 1R | • | QF | 2R | 1R | • | • | R32 | GS | 1R |
| 2 | Maccabi Haifa (5) | • | 1R | • | R32 | 2R | 1R | • | R16 | • | • |
| 3 | Maccabi Tel Aviv (3) | 1R | • | 2R | 1R | • | • | • | • | • | • |
| 4 | Maccabi Petah Tikva (2) | • | • | • | • | • | 1R | GS | • | • | • |
| 5 | Beitar Jerusalem (1) | • | 1R | • | • | • | • | • | • | • | • |
| 6 | Bnei Sakhnin (1) | • | • | • | • | • | 1R | • | • | • | • |
| 7 | Hapoel Haifa (1) | 2R | • | • | • | • | • | • | • | • | • |
| 8 | Hapoel Ramat Gan (1) | • | • | • | • | 1R | • | • | • | • | • |
| (Croatia) | CROATIA (21) | (2) | (3) | (4) | (3) | (4) | (1) | (0) | (1) | (1) | (2) |
| 1 | Dinamo Zagreb (8) | • | 2R | 1R | 2R | 2R | GS | • | 1R | GS | GS |
| 2 | Hajduk Split (4) | 1R | • | 1R | 1R | 2R | • | • | • | • | • |
| 3 | Osijek (3) | 1R | R32 | 2R | • | • | • | • | • | • | • |
| 4 | Varteks (3) | • | • | 2R | 1R | 1R | • | • | • | • | • |
| 5 | Kamen Ingrad (1) | • | • | • | • | 1R | • | • | • | • | • |
| 6 | Rijeka (1) | • | 1R | • | • | • | • | • | • | • | • |
| 7 | Slaven Belupo (1) | • | • | • | • | • | • | • | • | • | 1R |
| (Hungary) | HUNGARY (16) | (3) | (3) | (1) | (3) | (3) | (2) | (1) | (0) | (0) | (0) |
| 1 | Debrecen (4) | 1R | • | 1R | • | R32 | • | 1R | • | • | • |
| 2 | Ferencváros (4) | 1R | • | • | 2R | 1R | GS | • | • | • | • |
| 3 | MTK Budapest (3) | 2R | 2R | • | • | 1R | • | • | • | • | • |
| 4 | Újpest (2) | • | • | • | 1R | • | 1R | • | • | • | • |
| 5 | Dunaferr (1) | • | 1R | • | • | • | • | • | • | • | • |
| 6 | Vasas (1) | • | 1R | • | • | • | • | • | • | • | • |
| 7 | Zalaegerszeg (1) | • | • | • | 1R | • | • | • | • | • | • |
| (Cyprus) | CYPRUS (14) | (2) | (1) | (2) | (2) | (1) | (0) | (2) | (1) | (1) | (2) |
| 1 | APOEL (5) | • | 1R | • | 2R | 1R | • | 1R | • | • | 1R |
| 2 | Anorthosis (4) | 1R | • | • | 2R | • | • | 1R | • | 1R | • |
| 3 | Omonia (2) | 1R | • | • | • | • | • | • | • | • | 1R |
| 4 | Apollon Limassol (1) | • | • | 1R | • | • | • | • | • | • | • |
| 5 | Ethnikos Achna (1) | • | • | • | • | • | • | • | 1R | • | • |
| 6 | Olympiakos Nicosia (1) | • | • | 1R | • | • | • | • | • | • | • |
| (Slovenia) | SLOVENIA (12) | (2) | (2) | (2) | (1) | (2) | (2) | (1) | (0) | (0) | (0) |
| 1 | Gorica (4) | 1R | 1R | 1R | • | • | 1R | • | • | • | • |
| 2 | Olimpija Ljubljana (4) | 1R | 1R | 1R | • | 1R | • | • | • | • | • |
| 3 | Domžale (1) | • | • | • | • | • | • | 1R | • | • | • |
| 4 | Maribor (1) | • | • | • | • | • | 1R | • | • | • | • |
| 5 | Primorje (1) | • | • | • | 1R | • | • | • | • | • | • |
| 6 | Publikum Celje (1) | • | • | • | • | 1R | • | • | • | • | • |
| (Finland) | FINLAND (8) | (1) | (1) | (2) | (0) | (1) | (0) | (1) | (0) | (1) | (1) |
| 1 | HJK (3) | 1R | 1R | 1R | • | • | • | • | • | • | • |
| 2 | MyPa (2) | • | • | • | • | 1R | • | 1R | • | • | • |
| 3 | Haka (1) | • | • | 1R | • | • | • | • | • | • | • |
| 4 | Honka (1) | • | • | • | • | • | • | • | • | • | 1R |
| 5 | Tampere United (1) | • | • | • | • | • | • | • | • | 1R | • |
| (Bosnia and Herzegovina) | BOSNIA AND HERZEGOVINA (6) | (0) | (0) | (0) | (3) | (1) | (0) | (1) | (0) | (1) | (0) |
| 1 | Sarajevo (2) | • | • | • | 1R | • | • | • | • | 1R | • |
| 2 | Široki Brijeg (2) | • | • | • | 1R | • | • | 1R | • | • | • |
| 3 | Željezničar (2) | • | • | • | 1R | 1R | • | • | • | • | • |
| (Republic of Ireland) | REPUBLIC OF IRELAND (5) | (0) | (1) | (0) | (0) | (0) | (1) | (1) | (1) | (0) | (1) |
| 1 | Bohemians (1) | • | 1R | • | • | • | • | • | • | • | • |
| 2 | Cork City (1) | • | • | • | • | • | • | 1R | • | • | • |
| 3 | Derry City (1) | • | • | • | • | • | • | • | 1R | • | • |
| 4 | Shelbourne (1) | • | • | • | • | • | 1R | • | • | • | • |
| 5 | St Patrick's Athletic (1) | • | • | • | • | • | • | • | • | • | 1R |
| (North Macedonia) | NORTH MACEDONIA (5) | (0) | (1) | (0) | (0) | (2) | (0) | (0) | (1) | (1) | (0) |
| 1 | Rabotnički (2) | • | • | • | • | • | • | • | 1R | 1R | • |
| 2 | Cementarnica 55 (1) | • | • | • | • | 1R | • | • | • | • | • |
| 3 | Pobeda (1) | • | 1R | • | • | • | • | • | • | • | • |
| 4 | Vardar (1) | • | • | • | • | 1R | • | • | • | • | • |
| (Latvia) | LATVIA (5) | (1) | (0) | (0) | (1) | (1) | (2) | (0) | (0) | (0) | (0) |
| 1 | Ventspils (3) | • | • | • | 1R | 1R | 1R | • | • | • | • |
| 2 | Liepājas Metalurgs (1) | • | • | • | • | • | 1R | • | • | • | • |
| 3 | Skonto (1) | 1R | • | • | • | • | • | • | • | • | • |
| (Georgia (country)) | GEORGIA (4) | (2) | (0) | (0) | (1) | (0) | (1) | (0) | (0) | (0) | (0) |
| 1 | Dinamo Tbilisi (2) | • | • | • | 1R | • | GS | • | • | • | • |
| 2 | Locomotive Tbilisi (1) | 1R | • | • | • | • | • | • | • | • | • |
| 3 | Torpedo Kutaisi (1) | 1R | • | • | • | • | • | • | • | • | • |
| (Moldova) | MOLDOVA (4) | (1) | (1) | (0) | (1) | (1) | (0) | (0) | (0) | (0) | (0) |
| 1 | Zimbru Chișinău (4) | 1R | 1R | • | 1R | 1R | • | • | • | • | • |
| (Belarus) | BELARUS (3) | (0) | (0) | (1) | (1) | (0) | (0) | (0) | (0) | (1) | (0) |
| 1 | BATE Borisov (2) | • | • | 1R | • | • | • | • | • | 1R | • |
| 2 | Gomel (1) | • | • | • | 1R | • | • | • | • | • | • |
| (Iceland) | ICELAND (2) | (0) | (0) | (1) | (0) | (0) | (1) | (0) | (0) | (0) | (0) |
| 1 | FH (1) | • | • | • | • | • | 1R | • | • | • | • |
| 2 | Fylkir (1) | • | • | 1R | • | • | • | • | • | • | • |
| (Lithuania) | LITHUANIA (2) | (0) | (0) | (0) | (1) | (0) | (0) | (0) | (0) | (0) | (1) |
| 1 | FBK Kaunas (1) | • | • | • | • | • | • | • | • | • | 1R |
| 2 | Sūduva (1) | • | • | • | 1R | • | • | • | • | • | • |
| (Estonia) | ESTONIA (1) | (0) | (0) | (0) | (0) | (0) | (0) | (0) | (1) | (0) | (0) |
| 1 | Levadia Tallinn (1) | • | • | • | • | • | • | • | 1R | • | • |
| (Malta) | MALTA (1) | (0) | (0) | (1) | (0) | (0) | (0) | (0) | (0) | (0) | (0) |
| 1 | Birkirkara (1) | • | • | 1R | • | • | • | • | • | • | • |

== See also ==
- UEFA Europa League
- UEFA Cup and Europa League records and statistics
- UEFA Champions League clubs performance comparison
- UEFA Conference League clubs performance comparison
