= UEFA Conference League clubs performance comparison =

The comparison of the performances of all of the clubs that participated in the UEFA Conference League is below. The qualification rounds are not taken into account.

Clubs transferred from UEFA Europa League marked in italics.

== Classification ==
C	Champion
F	Runner-up
SF	Semi-finals
QF	Quarter-finals
R16	Round of 16
KO	Knockout round play-offs
GS; LP	Group stage League phase
•	Did not participate

== Performance ==
Countries are ranked by total number of participations, then by the number of different participating clubs, and then alphabetically. Clubs are ranked by number of participations, then by titles, runner-up finishes, semi-final appearances, quarter-final appearances, and finally alphabetically.

#	Clubs (# of participations)	21–22	22–23	23–24	24–25	25–26	26–27
(Belgium)	BELGIUM (11)	(1)	(2)	(4)	(2)	(0)	(2)
1	Gent (5)	R16	QF	KO	KO	•	
2	Club Brugge (1)	•	•	SF	•	•	•
3	Anderlecht (1)	•	QF	•	•	•	•
4	Cercle Brugge (1)	•	•	•	R16	•	•
5	Genk (1)	•	•	GS	•	•	•
6	Sint-Truiden (1)	•	•	•	•	•	
7	Union Saint-Gilloise (1)	•	•	R16	•	•	•
(Czech Republic)	CZECH REPUBLIC (10)	(3)	(2)	(1)	(1)	(2)	(1)
1	Slavia Prague (2)	QF	GS	•	•	•	•
2	Jablonec (2)	GS	•	•	•	•	
3	Sparta Prague (2)	KO	•	•	•	R16	•
4	Viktoria Plzeň (1)	•	•	QF	•	•	•
5	Mladá Boleslav (1)	•	•	•	LP	•	•
6	Sigma Olomouc (1)	•	•	•	•	R16	•
7	Slovácko (1)	•	GS	•	•	•	•
(Cyprus)	CYPRUS (10)	(2)	(2)	(0)	(3)	(2)	(1)
1	Omonia (3)	GS	•	•	KO	KO	•
2	AEK Larnaca (2)	•	R16	•	•	R16	•
3	Pafos (2)	•	•	•	R16	•	
4	Anorthosis (1)	GS	•	•	•	•	•
5	APOEL (1)	•	•	•	KO	•	•
6	Apollon Limassol (1)	•	GS	•	•	•	•
(Denmark)	DENMARK (10)	(3)	(1)	(1)	(1)	(0)	(4)
1	Copenhagen (3)	R16	•	•	R16	•	
2	Midtjylland (2)	KO	•	•	•	•	
3	Nordsjælland (2)	•	•	GS	•	•	
4	AGF (1)	•	•	•	•	•	
5	Randers (1)	KO	•	•	•	•	•
6	Silkeborg (1)	•	GS	•	•	•	•
(Netherlands)	NETHERLANDS (10)	(4)	(1)	(2)	(0)	(1)	(2)
1	AZ (4)	R16	SF	GS	•	QF	•
2	Ajax (2)	•	•	R16	•	•	
3	Feyenoord (1)	F	•	•	•	•	•
4	PSV Eindhoven (1)	QF	•	•	•	•	•
5	Twente (1)	•	•	•	•	•	
6	Vitesse (1)	R16	•	•	•	•	•
(Switzerland)	SWITZERLAND (9)	(1)	(1)	(2)	(2)	(1)	(2)
1	Lugano (3)	•	•	GS	R16	•	
2	Basel (2)	R16	SF	•	•	•	•
3	Lausanne-Sport (1)	•	•	•	•	KO	•
4	Servette (1)	•	•	R16	•	•	•
5	St. Gallen (1)	•	•	•	LP	•	•
6	Thun (1)	•	•	•	•	•	
(Turkey)	TURKEY (9)	(1)	(3)	(2)	(1)	(1)	(1)
1	Fenerbahçe (2)	KO	•	QF	•	•	•
2	İstanbul Başakşehir (2)	•	R16	•	LP	•	•
3	Trabzonspor (2)	•	KO	•	•	•	
4	Beşiktaş (1)	•	•	GS	•	•	•
5	Samsunspor (1)	•	•	•	•	R16	•
6	Sivasspor (1)	•	R16	•	•	•	•
(Poland)	POLAND (8)	(0)	(1)	(1)	(2)	(4)	(0)
1	Legia Warsaw (3)	•	•	KO	QF	LP	•
2	Jagiellonia Białystok (2)	•	•	•	QF	KO	•
3	Lech Poznań (2)	•	QF	•	•	R16	•
4	Raków Częstochowa (1)	•	•	•	•	R16	•
(England)	ENGLAND (7)	(2)	(1)	(1)	(1)	(1)	(1)
1	Chelsea (1)	•	•	•	C	•	•
2	Crystal Palace (1)	•	•	•	•	C	•
3	West Ham United (1)	•	C	•	•	•	•
4	Aston Villa (1)	•	•	SF	•	•	•
5	Leicester City (1)	SF	•	•	•	•	•
6	Brighton & Hove Albion (1)	•	•	•	•	•	
7	Tottenham Hotspur (1)	GS	•	•	•	•	•
(Austria)	AUSTRIA (7)	(2)	(1)	(1)	(2)	(1)	(0)
1	Rapid Wien (3)	KO	•	•	QF	LP	•
2	LASK (2)	R16	•	•	LP	•	•
3	Austria Wien (1)	•	GS	•	•	•	•
4	Sturm Graz (1)	•	•	R16	•	•	•
(Italy)	ITALY (7)	(1)	(2)	(1)	(1)	(1)	(1)
1	Fiorentina (4)	•	F	F	SF	QF	•
2	Roma (1)	C	•	•	•	•	•
3	Atalanta (1)	•	•	•	•	•	
4	Lazio (1)	•	R16	•	•	•	•
(Norway)	NORWAY (7)	(1)	(2)	(2)	(1)	(0)	(1)
1	Bodø/Glimt (3)	QF	KO	KO	•	•	•
2	Molde (3)	•	GS	R16	R16	•	•
3	Brann (1)	•	•	•	•	•	
(France)	FRANCE (6)	(2)	(1)	(1)	(0)	(1)	(1)
1	Marseille (1)	SF	•	•	•	•	•
2	Strasbourg (1)	•	•	•	•	SF	•
3	Lille (1)	•	•	QF	•	•	•
4	Nice (1)	•	QF	•	•	•	•
5	Monaco (1)	•	•	•	•	•	
6	Rennes (1)	R16	•	•	•	•	•
(Germany)	GERMANY (6)	(1)	(1)	(1)	(1)	(1)	(1)
1	Mainz 05 (1)	•	•	•	•	QF	•
2	1. FC Heidenheim (1)	•	•	•	KO	•	•
3	1. FC Köln (1)	•	GS	•	•	•	•
4	Eintracht Frankfurt (1)	•	•	KO	•	•	•
5	SC Freiburg (1)	•	•	•	•	•	
6	Union Berlin (1)	GS	•	•	•	•	•
(Greece)	GREECE (6)	(1)	(0)	(2)	(1)	(1)	(1)
1	PAOK (2)	QF	•	QF	•	•	•
2	Panathinaikos (2)	•	•	•	R16	•	
3	Olympiacos (1)	•	•	C	•	•	•
4	AEK Athens (1)	•	•	•	•	QF	•
(Scotland)	SCOTLAND (6)	(1)	(1)	(1)	(1)	(1)	(1)
1	Heart of Midlothian (3)	•	GS	•	LP	•	
2	Aberdeen (2)	•	•	GS	•	LP	•
3	Celtic (1)	KO	•	•	•	•	•
(Serbia)	SERBIA (5)	(1)	(1)	(1)	(1)	(0)	(1)
1	Partizan (2)	R16	KO	•	•	•	•
2	Čukarički (1)	•	•	GS	•	•	•
3	Red Star Belgrade (1)	•	•	•	•	•	
4	TSC (1)	•	•	•	KO	•	•
(Spain)	SPAIN (5)	(0)	(1)	(1)	(1)	(1)	(1)
1	Real Betis (2)	•	•	KO	F	•	•
2	Rayo Vallecano (1)	•	•	•	•	F	•
3	Getafe (1)	•	•	•	•	•	
4	Villarreal (1)	•	R16	•	•	•	•
(Ukraine)	UKRAINE (5)	(1)	(1)	(1)	(0)	(2)	(0)
1	Zorya Luhansk (2)	GS	•	GS	•	•	•
2	Shakhtar Donetsk (1)	•	•	•	•	SF	•
3	Dnipro-1 (1)	•	KO	•	•	•	•
4	Dynamo Kyiv (1)	•	•	•	•	LP	•
(Israel)	ISRAEL (5)	(2)	(1)	(2)	(0)	(0)	(0)
1	Maccabi Haifa (2)	GS	•	R16	•	•	•
2	Maccabi Tel Aviv (2)	KO	•	R16	•	•	•
3	Hapoel Be'er Sheva (1)	•	GS	•	•	•	•
(Romania)	ROMANIA (5)	(1)	(2)	(0)	(0)	(1)	(1)
1	CFR Cluj (2)	GS	KO	•	•	•	•
2	Universitatea Craiova (2)	•	•	•	•	LP	
3	FCSB (1)	•	GS	•	•	•	•
(Slovenia)	SLOVENIA (5)	(1)	(0)	(1)	(2)	(1)	(0)
1	Celje (2)	•	•	•	QF	R16	•
2	Olimpija Ljubljana (2)	•	•	GS	KO	•	•
3	Mura (1)	GS	•	•	•	•	•
(Finland)	FINLAND (5)	(1)	(0)	(1)	(1)	(1)	(1)
1	HJK (3)	GS	•	GS	LP	•	•
2	KuPS (2)	•	•	•	•	KO	
(Slovakia)	SLOVAKIA (5)	(1)	(1)	(2)	(0)	(1)	(0)
1	Slovan Bratislava (4)	GS	R16	KO	•	LP	•
2	Spartak Trnava (1)	•	•	GS	•	•	•
(Armenia)	ARMENIA (4)	(1)	(1)	(0)	(1)	(1)	(0)
1	Noah (2)	•	•	•	LP	KO	•
2	Alashkert (1)	GS	•	•	•	•	•
3	Pyunik (1)	•	GS	•	•	•	•
(Sweden)	SWEDEN (4)	(0)	(1)	(0)	(1)	(1)	(1)
1	Djurgårdens IF (2)	•	R16	•	SF	•	•
2	BK Häcken (1)	•	•	•	•	LP	•
3	Mjällby AIF (1)	•	•	•	•	•	
(Bosnia and Herzegovina)	BOSNIA AND HERZEGOVINA (4)	(0)	(0)	(1)	(1)	(1)	(1)
1	Borac Banja Luka (2)	•	•	•	R16	•	
2	Zrinjski Mostar (2)	•	•	GS	•	KO	•
(Bulgaria)	BULGARIA (4)	(1)	(1)	(1)	(0)	(0)	(1)
1	CSKA Sofia (2)	GS	•	•	•	•	
2	Ludogorets Razgrad (2)	•	KO	KO	•	•	•
(Kazakhstan)	KAZAKHSTAN (4)	(1)	(0)	(1)	(1)	(0)	(1)
1	Astana (2)	•	•	GS	LP	•	•
2	Kairat (2)	GS	•	•	•	•	
(Republic of Ireland)	REPUBLIC OF IRELAND (4)	(0)	(1)	(0)	(1)	(2)	(0)
1	Shamrock Rovers (3)	•	GS	•	KO	LP	•
2	Shelbourne (1)	•	•	•	•	LP	•
(Croatia)	CROATIA (3)	(0)	(0)	(1)	(0)	(1)	(1)
1	Dinamo Zagreb (1)	•	•	R16	•	•	•
2	Hajduk Split (1)	•	•	•	•	•	
3	Rijeka (1)	•	•	•	•	R16	•
(Iceland)	ICELAND (3)	(0)	(0)	(1)	(1)	(1)	(0)
1	Breiðablik (2)	•	•	GS	•	LP	•
2	Víkingur Reykjavík (1)	•	•	•	KO	•	•
(Kosovo)	KOSOVO (3)	(0)	(1)	(1)	(0)	(1)	(0)
1	Ballkani (2)	•	GS	GS	•	•	•
2	Drita (1)	•	•	•	•	KO	•
(Portugal)	PORTUGAL (3)	(0)	(1)	(0)	(1)	(0)	(1)
1	Braga (2)	•	KO	•	•	•	
2	Vitória de Guimarães (1)	•	•	•	R16	•	•
(Gibraltar)	GIBRALTAR (3)	(1)	(0)	(0)	(0)	(1)	(1)
1	Lincoln Red Imps (3)	GS	•	•	•	LP	
(Latvia)	LATVIA (2)	(0)	(1)	(0)	(0)	(0)	(1)
1	RFS (1)	•	GS	•	•	•	•
2	Riga (1)	•	•	•	•	•	
(Lithuania)	LITHUANIA (2)	(0)	(1)	(0)	(0)	(0)	(1)
1	Kauno Žalgiris (1)	•	•	•	•	•	
2	Žalgiris (1)	•	GS	•	•	•	•
(Moldova)	MOLDOVA (2)	(0)	(1)	(0)	(1)	(0)	(0)
1	Petrocub Hîncești (1)	•	•	•	LP	•	•
2	Sheriff Tiraspol (1)	•	R16	•	•	•	•
(Azerbaijan)	AZERBAIJAN (2)	(1)	(1)	(0)	(0)	(0)	(0)
1	Qarabağ (2)	KO	KO	•	•	•	•
(Albania)	ALBANIA (1)	(0)	(0)	(0)	(0)	(0)	(1)
1	Egnatia (1)	•	•	•	•	•	
(Andorra)	ANDORRA (1)	(0)	(0)	(0)	(0)	(0)	(1)
1	Inter Club d'Escaldes (1)	•	•	•	•	•	
(Belarus)	BELARUS (1)	(0)	(0)	(0)	(1)	(0)	(0)
1	Dinamo Minsk (1)	•	•	•	LP	•	•
(Estonia)	ESTONIA (1)	(1)	(0)	(0)	(0)	(0)	(0)
1	Flora (1)	GS	•	•	•	•	•
(Faroe Islands)	FAROE ISLANDS (1)	(0)	(0)	(1)	(0)	(0)	(0)
1	KÍ (1)	•	•	GS	•	•	•
(Georgia (country))	GEORGIA (1)	(0)	(0)	(0)	(0)	(0)	(1)
1	Iberia 1999 (1)	•	•	•	•	•	
(Hungary)	HUNGARY (1)	(0)	(0)	(1)	(0)	(0)	(0)
1	Ferencváros (1)	•	•	KO	•	•	•
(Liechtenstein)	LIECHTENSTEIN (1)	(0)	(1)	(0)	(0)	(0)	(0)
1	Vaduz (1)	•	GS	•	•	•	•
(Malta)	MALTA (1)	(0)	(0)	(0)	(0)	(1)	(0)
1	Hamrun Spartans (1)	•	•	•	•	LP	•
(North Macedonia)	NORTH MACEDONIA (1)	(0)	(0)	(0)	(0)	(1)	(0)
1	Shkëndija (1)	•	•	•	•	KO	•
(Northern Ireland)	NORTHERN IRELAND (1)	(0)	(0)	(0)	(1)	(0)	(0)
1	Larne (1)	•	•	•	LP	•	•
(Wales)	WALES (1)	(0)	(0)	(0)	(1)	(0)	(0)
1	The New Saints (1)	•	•	•	LP	•	•

== See also ==
- UEFA Conference League
- UEFA Europa League clubs performance comparison
- UEFA Champions League clubs performance comparison
