= 2019–20 Eintracht Frankfurt season =

Eintracht Frankfurt
2019–20 season
- President: Peter Fischer
- Chairmen: Fredi Bobič; Axel Hellmann; Oliver Frankenbach
- Manager: Adi Hütter
- Stadium: Commerzbank-Arena
- Bundesliga: 9th
- DFB-Pokal: Semi-finals
- UEFA Europa League: Round of 16
- Top goalscorer: League: André Silva (12); All: André Silva (16)
- Highest home attendance: 51,500 (sold out)
- Lowest home attendance: 46,500
- Average home league attendance: 50,158
Home colours	Away colours	Third colours

The 2019–20 was the 120th in the history of Eintracht Frankfurt, a football club based in Frankfurt, Germany. It was their 8th consecutive and 51st overall season in the top flight of German football, the Bundesliga, having been promoted from the 2. Bundesliga in 2012. In addition to the domestic league, Eintracht Frankfurt also participated in this season's edition of the domestic cup, the DFB-Pokal. This was the 95th season for Frankfurt in the Commerzbank-Arena, located in Frankfurt, Hesse, Germany. The season originally covered a period from 1 July 2019 to 30 June 2020. It was extended extraordinarily to 6 August 2020 due to the COVID-19 pandemic in Germany.

== Players ==
=== Squad ===
As of 31 January 2020

Note: Flags indicate national team as defined under FIFA eligibility rules; some limited exceptions apply. Players may hold more than one non-FIFA nationality.

No.	Pos.	Nation	Player
1	GK	GER	Kevin Trapp
2	DF	FRA	Evan Ndicka
3	MF	AUT	Stefan Ilsanker
5	MF	SUI	Gelson Fernandes (3rd captain)
6	MF	NED	Jonathan de Guzmán
8	MF	SUI	Djibril Sow
9	FW	NED	Bas Dost
10	MF	SRB	Filip Kostić
11	MF	SRB	Mijat Gaćinović
13	DF	AUT	Martin Hinteregger
15	MF	JPN	Daichi Kamada
16	MF	ESP	Lucas Torró
17	MF	GER	Sebastian Rode
18	DF	FRA	Almamy Touré
19	DF	ARG	David Abraham (captain)

No.	Pos.	Nation	Player
20	MF	JPN	Makoto Hasebe (vice-captain)
22	DF	USA	Timothy Chandler
23	DF	GER	Marco Russ (4th captain)
24	DF	GER	Danny da Costa
25	DF	GER	Erik Durm
26	MF	GER	Nils Stendera
28	MF	GER	Dominik Kohr
29	GK	GER	Felix Wiedwald
30	MF	GER	Şahverdi Çetin
32	GK	DEN	Frederik Rønnow
33	FW	POR	André Silva (on loan from Milan)
37	GK	GER	Jan Zimmermann
38	MF	GER	Patrick Finger
39	FW	POR	Gonçalo Paciência
42	MF	BIH	Marijan Ćavar

=== Players out on loan ===
Note: Flags indicate national team as defined under FIFA eligibility rules; some limited exceptions apply. Players may hold more than one non-FIFA nationality.

No.	Pos.	Nation	Player
—	MF	GER	Aymen Barkok (at Fortuna Düsseldorf until 30 June 2020)
—	DF	GUI	Simon Falette (at Fenerbahçe until 30 June 2020)
—	FW	SRB	Dejan Joveljić (at Anderlecht until 30 June 2020)
—	FW	CRO	Ante Rebić (at AC Milan until 30 June 2021)

No.	Pos.	Nation	Player
—	DF	BRA	Tuta (at KV Kortrijk until 30 June 2020)
—	DF	NED	Jetro Willems (at Newcastle United until 30 June 2020)
—	MF	URU	Rodrigo Zalazar (at Korona Kielce until 30 June 2020)

=== Transfers ===
==== In ====
No.	Pos.	Name	Age	EU	Moving from	Type	Transfer Window	Contract ends	Transfer fee	Sources
1	Goalkeeper	Kevin Trapp	29	Yes	Paris Saint-Germain	Transfer	Summer	30 June 2024	€7.0 million	
7	Midfielder	Danny Blum	28	Yes	UD Las Palmas	Loan return	Summer	30 June 2020	—	
7	Striker	Dejan Joveljić	19	No	Red Star Belgrade	Transfer	Summer	30 June 2024	€4.0 million	
8	Striker	Luka Jović	21	Yes	Benfica, was previously loaned	Transfer	Summer	30 June 2023	€7.0 million	
8	Midfielder	Djibril Sow	22	No	BSC Young Boys	Transfer	Summer	30 June 2024	€9.0 million	
9	Striker	Bas Dost	30	Yes	Sporting CP	Transfer	Summer	30 June 2022	€7.0 million	
10	Midfielder	Filip Kostić	26	Yes	Hamburger SV, was previously loaned	Transfer	Summer	30 June 2023	€6.0 million	
13	Defender	Martin Hinteregger	26	Yes	FC Augsburg	Transfer	Summer	30 June 2024	€9.0 million	
15	Midfielder	Daichi Kamada	22	No	Sint-Truidense VV	Loan return	Summer	30 June 2021	—	
17	Midfielder	Sebastian Rode	28	Yes	Borussia Dortmund	Transfer	Summer	30 June 2024	€4.0 million	
25	Defender	Erik Durm	27	Yes	Huddersfield Town	Free transfer	Summer	30 June 2023	—	
27	Midfielder	Nicolai Müller	31	Yes	Hannover 96	Loan return	Summer	30 June 2020	—	
28	Midfielder	Dominik Kohr	25	Yes	Bayer Leverkusen	Free transfer	Summer	30 June 2024	€8.5 million	
29	Goalkeeper	Felix Wiedwald	29	Yes	MSV Duisburg	Loan return	Summer	30 June 2021	—	
33	Striker	André Silva	23	Yes	AC Milan	Loan	Summer	30 June 2021	Undisclosed	
35	Defender	Noel Knothe	20	Yes	FC Pipinsried	Loan return	Summer	30 June 2020	—	
42	Midfielder	Marijan Ćavar	21	Yes	NK Osijek	Loan return	Summer	30 June 2021	—	
	Defender	Deji-Ousman Beyreuther	19	Yes	Chemnitzer FC	Loan return	Summer	30 June 2021	—	
	Midfielder	Rodrigo Zalazar	19	Yes	Atlético Malagueño	Free transfer	Summer	30 June 2023	—	
3	Midfielder	Stefan Ilsanker	30	Yes	RB Leipzig	Transfer	Winter	30 June 2022	€500,000	

==== Out ====
No.	Pos.	Name	Age	EU	Moving to	Type	Transfer Window	Transfer fee	Sources
4	Striker	Ante Rebić	25	Yes	AC Milan	Loan	Summer	€5.0 million	
7	Striker	Danny Blum	28	Yes	VfL Bochum	Transfer	Summer	€250,000	
8	Striker	Luka Jović	21	No	Real Madrid	Transfer	Summer	€60.0 million	
9	Striker	Sébastien Haller	25	Yes	West Ham United	Transfer	Summer	€40.0 million	
13	Defender	Martin Hinteregger	26	Yes	FC Augsburg	Loan return	Summer	Free	
15	Defender	Jetro Willems	25	Yes	Newcastle United	Loan	Summer	€1.0 million	
17	Midfielder	Sebastian Rode	28	Yes	Borussia Dortmund	Loan return	Summer	Free	
18	Midfielder	Max Besuschkow	22	Yes	Jahn Regensburg	Transfer	Summer	Undisclosed	
21	Midfielder	Marc Stendera	23	Yes	Hannover 96	Free transfer	Summer	Undisclosed	
25	Striker	Patrice Kabuya	19	Yes	Hamburger SV II	Free transfer	Summer	Free	
27	Midfielder	Nicolai Müller	32	Yes	Western Sydney Wanderers	Transfer	Summer	Undisclosed	
29	Defender	Andersson Ordóñez	25	No	LDU de Quito	Transfer	Summer	€450,000	
31	Goalkeeper	Kevin Trapp	28	Yes	Paris Saint-Germain	Loan return	Summer	Free	
32	Striker	Nelson Mandela Mbouhom	20	No	Sportfreunde Lotte	Free transfer	Summer	Free	
33	Defender	Taleb Tawatha	27	No	Ludogorets Razgrad	Free transfer	Summer	Free	
34	Striker	Branimir Hrgota	26	Yes	SpVgg Greuther Fürth	Free transfer	Summer	Free	
35	Defender	Noel Knothe	20	Yes	1. FC Nürnberg II	Released	Summer	Free	
35	Defender	Tuta	20	No	KV Kortrijk	Loan	Summer	Undisclosed	
36	Striker	Mischa Häuser	19	Yes	FSV Frankfurt	Free transfer	Summer	Free	
41	Striker	Tobias Stirl	19	Yes	VfL Wolfsburg II	Free transfer	Summer	Free	
	Defender	Deji Beyreuther	19	Yes	TSG 1899 Hoffenheim II	Free transfer	Summer	Free	
	Midfielder	Rodrigo Zalazar	19	Yes	Korona Kielce	Loan	Summer	Undisclosed	
3	Defender	Simon Falette	27	Yes	Fenerbahçe	Loan	Winter	Undisclosed	
7	Defender	Dejan Joveljić	20	Yes	RSC Anderlecht	Loan	Winter	Undisclosed	

== Friendly matches ==
Win Draw Loss

4 July 2019	DJK Bad Homburg	0–14	Eintracht Frankfurt	Bad Homburg, Germany
19:00 CEST (UTC+2)		Report	Kamada 1', 13'; Haller 4', 27'; Chandler 38'; Müller 47', 58'; Paciência 53', 67' (pen.), 75', 85'; Da Costa 59'; Stendera 61'; Kohr 88'	Stadium: Sportzentrum NordWest; Attendance: 4,500; Referee: Schandry

10 July 2019 Uhrencup	Young Boys (Switzerland)	5–1	(Germany) Eintracht Frankfurt	Biel/Bienne, Switzerland
20:00 CEST (UTC+2)	Hoarau 6'; Ngamaleu 30'; Nsame 68'; Gaudino 75', 82'	Report	Kamada 86'	Stadium: Tissot Arena; Attendance: 5,000

12 July 2019 Uhrencup	Luzern (Switzerland)	1–3	(Germany) Eintracht Frankfurt	Biel/Bienne, Switzerland
20:00 CEST (UTC+2)	Voca 44'	Report	Kamada 8'; Haller 17'; Paciência 76'	Stadium: Tissot Arena; Attendance: 1,867; Referee: Hänni

28 July 2019	Wels (Austria)	0–7	(Germany) Eintracht Frankfurt	Wels, Austria
18:00 CEST (UTC+2)		Report	Paciência 10', 21', 43'; De Guzmán 30'; Stendera 40'; Joveljić 64', 69'	Stadium: Huber Arena; Attendance: 2,800

6 September 2019	Eintracht Frankfurt	5–1	Chemie Leipzig	Frankfurt, Germany
20:00 CEST (UTC+2)	Silva 15', 84'; Durm 40'; Torró 61'; Chandler 64'	Report	Petráček 17'	Stadium: Stadion am Bornheimer Hang; Attendance: 9,000
Note: Benefit match for Chemie Leipzig's stadium ("Floodlights for Leutzsch")

10 October 2019	FC Gießen	3–1	Eintracht Frankfurt	Gießen, Germany
16:30 CEST (UTC+2)	Rinderknecht 57'; Koch 65'; Benamar 78'	Report	Durm 75'	Stadium: Waldstadion; Attendance: 7,000; Referee: Haustein
Note: Benefit match for the sports foundation Hessen

14 November 2019	Eintracht Frankfurt	2–1	SV Sandhausen	Frankfurt, Germany
14:00 CET (UTC+1)	Molenaar 10'; Çakar 32'	Report	Klingmann 24'	Stadium: Commerzbank-Arena; Attendance: -
Note: Closed session without audience

9 January 2020	Eintracht Frankfurt	1–2	Hertha BSC	St. Petersburg, Florida, United States
19:00 EST (UTC-5)	Chandler 73'	Report	Esswein 71', 73' (pen.)	Stadium: Al Lang Stadium; Attendance: 4,600

1 August 2020	Eintracht Frankfurt (Germany)	1–1	(France) Monaco	Frankfurt, Germany
18:00 CEST (UTC+2)	Paciência 59'	Report	Musaba 85'	Stadium: Deutsche Bank Park; Attendance: 0 Referee: Tobias Welz

== Competitions ==
Win Draw Loss

=== Bundesliga ===
==== League table ====
Pos	Team	Pld	W	D	L	GF	GA	GD	Pts	Qualification or relegation
7	VfL Wolfsburg	34	13	10	11	48	46	+2	49	Qualification for the Europa League second qualifying round (Note: Since the winners of the 2019–20 DFB-Pokal, Bayern Munich, qualified for the Champions League based on league position, the Europa League group stage spot was passed to the sixth-placed team, and the Europa League second qualifying round spot was passed to the seventh-placed team.)
8	SC Freiburg	34	13	9	12	48	47	+1	48	
9	Eintracht Frankfurt	34	13	6	15	59	60	−1	45	
10	Hertha BSC	34	11	8	15	48	59	−11	41	
11	Union Berlin	34	12	5	17	41	58	−17	41	

Source: DFB
Rules for classification: 1) Points; 2) Goal difference; 3) Goals scored; 4) Head-to-head results; 5) Head-to-head away goals scored; 6) Away goals scored; 7) Play-off.

==== Results summary ====
Overall								Home						Away					
Pld	W	D	L	GF	GA	GD	Pts	W	D	L	GF	GA	GD	W	D	L	GF	GA	GD
34	13	6	15	59	60	−1	45	8	5	5	37	28	+9	5	1	10	22	32	−10

Last updated: 27 June 2020.
Source: Bundesliga

==== Results by round ====
Round	1	2	3	4	5	6	7	8	9	10	11	12	13	14	15	16	17	18	19	20	21	22	23	24	25	26	27	28	29	30	31	32	33	34
Ground	H	A	H	A	H	A	H	H	A	H	A	H	A	H	A	H	A	A	H	A	H	A	H	A	A	H	A	H	A	H	A	H	A	H
Result	W	L	W	L	D	W	D	W	L	W	L	L	L	D	L	L	L	W	W	D	W	L	L	W	L	L	L	D	W	L	W	W	D	W
Position	7	10	7	9	9	9	9	8	9	7	9	10	10	11	12	12	13	11	9	11	9	10	11	12	12	13	14	14	11	11	10	9	9	9

Updated to match(es) played on 27 June 2020. Source: DFB
A = Away; H = Home; W = Win; D = Draw; L = Loss

==== Matches ====
The Bundesliga schedule was announced on 28 June 2019.

18 August 2019 1	Eintracht Frankfurt	1–0	1899 Hoffenheim	Frankfurt
15:30 CEST (UTC+2)	Hinteregger 1'	Report		Stadium: Commerzbank-Arena; Attendance: 50,200; Referee: Daniel Siebert

25 August 2019 2	RB Leipzig	2–1	Eintracht Frankfurt	Leipzig
15:30 CEST (UTC+2)	Werner 10'; Poulsen 80'	Report	Paciência 89'	Stadium: Red Bull Arena; Attendance: 40,108; Referee: Benjamin Cortus

1 September 2019 3	Eintracht Frankfurt	2–1	Fortuna Düsseldorf	Frankfurt
18:00 CEST (UTC+2)	Dost 57'; Paciência 86'	Report	Hennings 36'	Stadium: Commerzbank-Arena; Attendance: 49,800; Referee: Frank Willenborg

14 September 2019 4	FC Augsburg	2–1	Eintracht Frankfurt	Augsburg
15:30 CEST (UTC+2)	Richter 35'; Niederlechner 43'	Report	Paciência 73'	Stadium: WWK Arena; Attendance: 28,513; Referee: Harm Osmers

22 September 2019 5	Eintracht Frankfurt	2–2	Borussia Dortmund	Frankfurt
18:00 CEST (UTC+2)	Silva 43'; Delaney 88' (o.g.)	Report	Witsel 11'; Sancho 66'	Stadium: Commerzbank-Arena; Attendance: 51,500; Referee: Markus Schmidt

27 September 2019 6	Union Berlin	1–2	Eintracht Frankfurt	Berlin
20:30 CEST (UTC+2)	Ujah 86'	Report	Dost 48'; Silva 62'	Stadium: Stadion An der Alten Försterei; Attendance: 22,012; Referee: Sascha Stegemann

6 October 2019 7	Eintracht Frankfurt	2–2	Werder Bremen	Frankfurt
18:00 CEST (UTC+2)	Rode 55'; Silva 88'	Report	Klaassen 27'; Rashica 90+1' (pen.)	Stadium: Commerzbank-Arena; Attendance: 51,500; Referee: Guido Winkmann

18 October 2019 8	Eintracht Frankfurt	3–0	Bayer Leverkusen	Frankfurt
20:30 CEST (UTC+2)	Paciência 4', 17' (pen.); Dost 80'	Report		Stadium: Commerzbank-Arena; Attendance: 50,800; Referee: Christian Dingert

27 October 2019 9	Borussia Mönchengladbach	4–2	Eintracht Frankfurt	Mönchengladbach
18:00 CEST (UTC+2)	Thuram 28'; Wendt 45+2'; Elvedi 75'; Zakaria 85'	Report	Da Costa 59'; Hinteregger 79'	Stadium: Borussia-Park; Attendance: 52,300; Referee: Daniel Schlager

2 November 2019 10	Eintracht Frankfurt	5–1	Bayern Munich	Frankfurt
15:30 CET (UTC+1)	Kostić 25'; Sow 33'; Abraham 49'; Hinteregger 61'; Paciência 85'	Report	Lewandowski 37'	Stadium: Commerzbank-Arena; Attendance: 51,500; Referee: Markus Schmidt

10 November 2019 11	SC Freiburg	1–0	Eintracht Frankfurt	Freiburg
18:00 CET (UTC+1)	Petersen 77'	Report		Stadium: Schwarzwald-Stadion; Attendance: 24,000; Referee: Felix Brych

23 November 2019 12	Eintracht Frankfurt	0–2	VfL Wolfsburg	Frankfurt
15:30 CET (UTC+1)		Report	Weghorst 19'; João Victor 65'	Stadium: Commerzbank-Arena; Attendance: 50,700; Referee: Daniel Siebert

2 December 2019 13	Mainz 05	2–1	Eintracht Frankfurt	Mainz
20:30 CET (UTC+1)	Onisiwo 50'; Szalai 69'	Report	Hinteregger 34'	Stadium: Opel Arena; Attendance: 33,184; Referee: Manuel Gräfe

6 December 2019 14	Eintracht Frankfurt	2–2	Hertha BSC	Frankfurt
20:30 CET (UTC+1)	Hinteregger 65'; Rode 86'	Report	Lukebakio 30'; Grujić 63'	Stadium: Commerzbank-Arena; Attendance: 50,000; Referee: Christian Dingert

15 December 2019 15	Schalke 04	1–0	Eintracht Frankfurt	Gelsenkirchen
18:00 CET (UTC+1)	Raman 53'	Report		Stadium: Veltins-Arena; Attendance: 60,811; Referee: Felix Zwayer

18 December 2019 16	Eintracht Frankfurt	2–4	1. FC Köln	Frankfurt
20:30 CET (UTC+1)	Hinteregger 6'; Paciência 30'	Report	Hector 44'; Bornauw 72'; Drexler 81'; Jakobs 90+4'	Stadium: Commerzbank-Arena; Attendance: 50,300; Referee: Deniz Aytekin

22 December 2019 17	SC Paderborn	2–1	Eintracht Frankfurt	Paderborn
18:00 CET (UTC+1)	Sabiri 9'; Schonlau 41'	Report	Dost 72'	Stadium: Benteler-Arena; Attendance: 15,000; Referee: Markus Schmidt

18 January 2020 18	1899 Hoffenheim	1–2	Eintracht Frankfurt	Sinsheim
15:30 CET (UTC+1)	Stafylidis 48'	Report	Dost 18'; Chandler 62'	Stadium: Rhein-Neckar-Arena; Attendance: 29,000; Referee: Sascha Stegemann

25 January 2020 19	Eintracht Frankfurt	2–0	RB Leipzig	Frankfurt
15:30 CET (UTC+1)	Touré 48'; Kostić 90+4'	Report		Stadium: Commerzbank-Arena; Attendance: 50,300; Referee: Daniel Siebert

1 February 2020 20	Fortuna Düsseldorf	1–1	Eintracht Frankfurt	Düsseldorf
15:30 CET (UTC+1)	Ayhan 78'	Report	Chandler 90+3'	Stadium: Merkur Spiel-Arena; Attendance: 45,018; Referee: Frank Willenborg

7 February 2020 21	Eintracht Frankfurt	5–0	FC Augsburg	Frankfurt
20:30 CET (UTC+1)	Chandler 37', 48'; Silva 55'; Kostić 89', 90'	Report		Stadium: Commerzbank-Arena; Attendance: 48,800; Referee: Manuel Gräfe

14 February 2020 22	Borussia Dortmund	4–0	Eintracht Frankfurt	Dortmund
20:30 CET (UTC+1)	Piszczek 33'; Sancho 50'; Haaland 54'; Guerreiro 74'	Report		Stadium: Signal Iduna Park; Attendance: 81,365; Referee: Bastian Dankert

24 February 2020 23	Eintracht Frankfurt	1–2	Union Berlin	Frankfurt
20:30 CET (UTC+1)	Hübner 79' (o.g.)	Report	Andersson 49'; Ndicka 67' (o.g.)	Stadium: Commerzbank-Arena; Attendance: 47,000; Referee: Deniz Aytekin

7 March 2020 25	Bayer Leverkusen	4–0	Eintracht Frankfurt	Leverkusen
15:30 CET (UTC+1)	Havertz 4'; Bellarabi 14'; Paulinho 49', 55'	Report		Stadium: BayArena; Attendance: 30,210; Referee: Felix Brych

16 May 2020 26	Eintracht Frankfurt	1–3	Borussia Mönchengladbach	Frankfurt
18:30 CEST (UTC+2)	Silva 81'	Report	Pléa 1'; Thuram 7'; Bensebaini 72' (pen.)	Stadium: Commerzbank-Arena; Attendance: 0 Referee: Felix Zwayer
Note: The match was postponed on 13 March due to the pandemic of COVID-19 in Germany, and rescheduled to 16 May.

23 May 2020 27	Bayern Munich	5–2	Eintracht Frankfurt	Munich
18:30 CEST (UTC+2)	Goretzka 17'; Müller 41'; Lewandowski 46'; Davies 61'; Hinteregger 74' (o.g.)	Report	Hinteregger 52', 55'	Stadium: Allianz Arena; Attendance: 0 Referee: Marco Fritz
Note: The match was postponed on 13 March due to the pandemic of COVID-19 in Germany, and rescheduled to 23 May.

26 May 2020 28	Eintracht Frankfurt	3–3	SC Freiburg	Frankfurt
20:30 CEST (UTC+2)	Silva 35'; Kamada 79'; Chandler 82'	Report	Grifo 28'; Petersen 67'; Höler 69'	Stadium: Commerzbank-Arena; Attendance: 0 Referee: Martin Petersen
Note: The match was postponed on 24 March due to the pandemic of COVID-19 in Germany, and rescheduled to 26 May.

30 May 2020 29	VfL Wolfsburg	1–2	Eintracht Frankfurt	Wolfsburg
15:30 CEST (UTC+2)	Mbabu 58'	Report	Silva 27' (pen.); Kamada 85'	Stadium: Volkswagen Arena; Attendance: 0 Referee: Guido Winkmann
Note: The match was postponed on 24 March due to the pandemic of COVID-19 in Germany, and rescheduled to 30 May.

3 June 2020 24	Werder Bremen	0–3	Eintracht Frankfurt	Bremen
20:30 CEST (UTC+2)		Report	Silva 61'; Ilsanker 81', 90'	Stadium: Weser-Stadion; Attendance: 0 Referee: Patrick Ittrich
Note: The match was postponed due to the postponement of Frankfurt's UEFA Europa League match. It was then rescheduled to 3 June due to the pandemic of COVID-19 in Germany.

6 June 2020 30	Eintracht Frankfurt	0–2	Mainz 05	Frankfurt
15:30 CEST (UTC+2)		Report	Niakhaté 43'; Kunde 77'	Stadium: Commerzbank-Arena; Attendance: 0 Referee: Felix Brych
Note: The match was postponed on 24 March due to the pandemic of COVID-19 in Germany, and rescheduled to 6 June.

13 June 2020 31	Hertha BSC	1–4	Eintracht Frankfurt	Berlin
15:30 CEST (UTC+2)	Piątek 24'	Report	Dost 51'; Silva 62', 86'; Ndicka 68'	Stadium: Olympiastadion Berlin; Attendance: 0 Referee: Robert Hartmann
Note: The match was postponed on 24 March due to the pandemic of COVID-19 in Germany, and rescheduled to 13 June.

17 June 2020 32	Eintracht Frankfurt	2–1	Schalke 04	Frankfurt
18:30 CEST (UTC+2)	Silva 28'; Abraham 50'	Report	McKennie 59'	Stadium: Commerzbank-Arena; Attendance: 0 Referee: Guido Winkmann
Note: The match was postponed on 24 March due to the pandemic of COVID-19 in Germany, and rescheduled to 17 June.

20 June 2020 33	1. FC Köln	1–1	Eintracht Frankfurt	Cologne
15:30 CEST (UTC+2)	Kainz 45' (pen.)	Report	Dost 72'	Stadium: RheinEnergieStadion; Attendance: 0 Referee: Christian Dingert
Note: The match was postponed on 24 March due to the pandemic of COVID-19 in Germany, and rescheduled to 20 June.

27 June 2020 34	Eintracht Frankfurt	3–2	SC Paderborn	Frankfurt
15:30 CEST (UTC+2)	Rode 9'; Silva 33'; Dost 52'	Report	Dräger 55'; Michel 75'	Stadium: Commerzbank-Arena; Attendance: 0 Referee: Benjamin Brand
Note: The match was postponed on 7 May due to the pandemic of COVID-19 in Germany, and rescheduled to 27 June.

=== DFB-Pokal ===
11 August 2019 First round	Waldhof Mannheim	3–5	Eintracht Frankfurt	Mannheim
15:30 CEST (UTC+2)	Sulejmani 3', 11'; Marx 72'	Report	Kamada 21'; Kostić 45'; Rebić 76', 82', 88'	Stadium: Carl-Benz-Stadion; Attendance: 24,302; Referee: Felix Brych

30 October 2019 Second round	FC St. Pauli	1–2	Eintracht Frankfurt	Hamburg
20:45 CET (UTC+1)	Sobota 42' (pen.)	Report	Dost 4', 16'	Stadium: Millerntor-Stadion; Attendance: 29,373; Referee: Matthias Jöllenbeck

4 February 2020 Round of 16	Eintracht Frankfurt	3–1	RB Leipzig	Frankfurt
18:30 CET (UTC+1)	Silva 17' (pen.); Kostić 51', 90+5'	Report	Olmo 69'	Stadium: Waldstadion; Attendance: 47,400; Referee: Felix Brych

4 March 2020 Quarter-finals	Eintracht Frankfurt	2–0	Werder Bremen	Frankfurt
20:45 CET (UTC+1)	Silva 45+6' (pen.); Kamada 60'	Report		Stadium: Waldstadion; Attendance: 51,500; Referee: Felix Zwayer

10 June 2020 Semi-finals	Bayern Munich	2–1	Eintracht Frankfurt	Munich
20:45 CEST (UTC+2)	Perišić 14'; Lewandowski 74'	Report	Da Costa 70'	Stadium: Allianz Arena; Attendance: 0 Referee: Marco Fritz
Note: The match was postponed on 27 March due to the pandemic of COVID-19 in Germany, and rescheduled to 10 June.

=== UEFA Europa League ===
==== Second qualifying round ====
25 July 2019 First Leg	Flora (Estonia)	1–2	(Germany) Eintracht Frankfurt	Tallinn, Estonia
19:00 EEST (UTC+3)	Ainsalu 34'	Report	Torró 24'; Joveljić 71'	Stadium: A. Le Coq Arena; Attendance: 8,537; Referee: Ali Palabıyık (Turkey)

1 August 2019 Second Leg	Eintracht Frankfurt (Germany)	2–1 (4–2 agg.)	(Estonia) Flora	Frankfurt, Germany
20:30 CEST (UTC+2)	Paciência 37', 54' (pen.)	Report	Sinyavskiy 40'	Stadium: Commerzbank-Arena; Attendance: 48,000; Referee: Jørgen Daugbjerg Burchardt (Denmark)

==== Third qualifying round ====
8 August 2019 First Leg	Vaduz (Liechtenstein)	0–5	(Germany) Eintracht Frankfurt	Vaduz, Liechtenstein
20:30 CEST (UTC+2)		Report	Kostić 11', 27'; Kohr 40'; Paciência 53'; Gaćinović 63'	Stadium: Rheinpark Stadion; Attendance: 5,908; Referee: Paul Tierney (England)

15 August 2019 Second Leg	Eintracht Frankfurt (Germany)	1–0 (6–0 agg.)	(Liechtenstein) Vaduz	Frankfurt, Germany
20:30 CEST (UTC+2)	De Guzmán 31'	Report		Stadium: Commerzbank-Arena; Attendance: 48,000; Referee: Nikola Dabanović (Montenegro)

==== Play-off round ====
22 August 2019 First Leg	Strasbourg (France)	1–0	(Germany) Eintracht Frankfurt	Strasbourg, France
20:30 CEST (UTC+2)	Zohi 33'	Report		Stadium: Stade de la Meinau; Attendance: 23,000; Referee: Ivan Kružliak (Slovakia)

29 August 2019 Second Leg	Eintracht Frankfurt (Germany)	3–0 (3–1 agg.)	(France) Strasbourg	Frankfurt, Germany
20:30 CEST (UTC+2)	Mitrović 26' (o.g.); Kostić 60'; Da Costa 66'	Report		Stadium: Commerzbank-Arena; Attendance: 47,000; Referee: Orel Grinfeld (Israel)

==== Group stage ====
Pos	Team	Pld	W	D	L	GF	GA	GD	Pts	Qualification	ARS	FRA	STL	VSC
1	(England) Arsenal	6	3	2	1	14	7	+7	11	Advance to knockout phase	—	1–2	4–0	3–2
2	(Germany) Eintracht Frankfurt	6	3	0	3	8	10	−2	9	Advance to knockout phase	0–3	—	2–1	2–3
3	(Belgium) Standard Liège	6	2	2	2	8	10	−2	8		2–2	2–1	—	2–0
4	(Portugal) Vitória de Guimarães	6	1	2	3	7	10	−3	5		1–1	0–1	1–1	—

Source: UEFA
Rules for classification: Group stage tiebreakers

19 September 2019 1	Eintracht Frankfurt (Germany)	0–3	(England) Arsenal	Frankfurt, Germany
18:55 CEST (UTC+2)		Report	Willock 38'; Saka 85'; Aubameyang 87'	Stadium: Commerzbank-Arena; Attendance: 47,000; Referee: Davide Massa (Italy)

3 October 2019 2	Vitória de Guimarães (Portugal)	0–1	(Germany) Eintracht Frankfurt	Guimarães, Portugal
21:00 CEST (UTC+2)		Report	Ndicka 36'	Stadium: Estádio D. Afonso Henriques; Attendance: 15,187; Referee: Radu Petrescu (Romania)

24 October 2019 3	Eintracht Frankfurt (Germany)	2–1	(Belgium) Standard Liège	Frankfurt, Germany
21:00 CEST (UTC+2)	Abraham 28'; Hinteregger 73'	Report	Amallah 82'	Stadium: Commerzbank-Arena; Attendance: 47,000; Referee: Daniel Stefański (Poland)

7 November 2019 4	Standard Liège (Belgium)	2–1	(Germany) Eintracht Frankfurt	Liège, Belgium
18:55 CET (UTC+1)	Vanheusden 56'; Lestienne 90+4'	Report	Kostić 65'	Stadium: Stade Maurice Dufrasne; Attendance: 15,952; Referee: Matej Jug (Slovenia)

28 November 2019 5	Arsenal (England)	1–2	(Germany) Eintracht Frankfurt	London, England
21:00 CET (UTC+1)	Aubameyang 45+1'	Report	Kamada 55', 64'	Stadium: Emirates Stadium; Attendance: 49,419; Referee: Ruddy Buquet (France)

12 December 2019 6	Eintracht Frankfurt (Germany)	2–3	(Portugal) Vitória de Guimarães	Frankfurt, Germany
18:55 CET (UTC+1)	Da Costa 31'; Kamada 38'	Report	Rochinha 8'; Elmusrati 85'; Edwards 87'	Stadium: Commerzbank-Arena; Attendance: 47,000; Referee: Gediminas Mažeika (Lithuania)

==== Knockout phase ====
===== Round of 32 =====
20 February 2020 First Leg	Eintracht Frankfurt (Germany)	4–1	(Austria) Red Bull Salzburg	Frankfurt, Germany
18:55 CET (UTC+1)	Kamada 12', 43', 53'; Kostić 56'	Report	Hwang 85' (pen.)	Stadium: Commerzbank-Arena; Attendance: 47,000; Referee: Ali Palabıyık (Turkey)

28 February 2020 Second Leg	Red Bull Salzburg (Austria)	2–2 (3–6 agg.)	(Germany) Eintracht Frankfurt	Wals-Siezenheim, Austria
18:00 CET (UTC+1)	Ulmer 10'; Onguéné 72'	Report	Silva 30', 83'	Stadium: Stadion Wals-Siezenheim; Attendance: 29,000; Referee: Benoît Bastien (France)
Note: The match between FC Salzburg and Eintracht Frankfurt, originally scheduled to be played on 27 February, 21:00 CET, was postponed to 28 February, 18:00 CET, due to a storm warning.

===== Round of 16 =====
12 March 2020 First Leg	Eintracht Frankfurt (Germany)	0–3	(Switzerland) Basel	Frankfurt, Germany
18:55 CET (UTC+1)		Report	Campo 27'; Bua 73'; Frei 85'	Stadium: Commerzbank-Arena; Attendance: 0 Referee: Andreas Ekberg (Sweden)

6 August 2020 Second Leg	Basel (Switzerland)	1–0 (4–0 agg.)	(Germany) Eintracht Frankfurt	Basel, Switzerland
21:00 CEST (UTC+2)	Frei 88'	Report		Stadium: St. Jakob-Park; Attendance: 0 Referee: Antonio Mateu Lahoz (Spain)
Note: The match between Basel and Eintracht Frankfurt, originally scheduled to be played on 19 March in Basel, was rescheduled to be played at Waldstadion, Frankfurt, due to a pandemic of COVID-19 in Switzerland. However, on 13 March, the match was indefinitely postponed due to a pandemic of COVID-19 in Europe. The match was rescheduled on 17 June to 6 August.

== Statistics ==
=== Appearances and goals ===
No.	Pos	Nat	Player	Total		Bundesliga		DFB-Pokal		Europa League	
No.	Pos	Nat	Player	Apps	Goals	Apps	Goals	Apps	Goals	Apps	Goals
Goalkeepers
1	GK	(Germany) GER	Kevin Trapp	34	0	22	0	4	0	8	0
29	GK	(Germany) GER	Felix Wiedwald	6	0	3	0	0	0	3	0
32	GK	(Denmark) DEN	Frederik Rønnow	15	0	9	0	1	0	5	0
37	GK	(Germany) GER	Jan Zimmermann	0	0	0	0	0	0	0	0
Defenders
2	DF	(France) FRA	Evan Ndicka	34	2	20+2	1	4	0	8	1
13	DF	(Austria) AUT	Martin Hinteregger	49	9	30+1	8	5	0	12+1	1
18	DF	(France) FRA	Almamy Touré	29	1	18+1	1	3	0	7	0
19	DF	(Argentina) ARG	David Abraham	37	3	19+1	2	4+1	0	12	1
22	DF	(United States) USA	Timothy Chandler	33	5	12+10	5	3+1	0	1+6	0
23	DF	(Germany) GER	Marco Russ	1	0	0	0	0	0	1	0
24	DF	(Germany) GER	Danny da Costa	37	4	15+4	1	1+3	1	11+3	2
25	DF	(Germany) GER	Erik Durm	15	0	6+3	0	1+1	0	2+2	0
Midfielders
3	MF	(Austria) AUT	Stefan Ilsanker	18	2	9+3	2	2	0	2+2	0
5	MF	(Switzerland) SUI	Gelson Fernandes	22	0	10+1	0	2	0	5+4	0
6	MF	(Netherlands) NED	Jonathan de Guzmán	10	1	0+8	0	0	0	1+1	1
8	MF	(Switzerland) SUI	Djibril Sow	40	1	18+11	1	2	0	9	0
10	MF	(Serbia) SRB	Filip Kostić	51	12	33	4	3	3	15	5
11	MF	(Serbia) SRB	Mijat Gaćinović	36	1	11+12	0	2+1	0	5+5	1
15	MF	(Japan) JPN	Daichi Kamada	48	10	22+6	2	3+1	2	12+4	6
16	MF	(Spain) ESP	Lucas Torró	11	1	4+3	0	0+1	0	3	1
17	MF	(Germany) GER	Sebastian Rode	43	3	25+4	3	3	0	10+1	0
20	MF	(Japan) JPN	Makoto Hasebe	39	0	21+2	0	3	0	12+1	0
26	MF	(Germany) GER	Nils Stendera	0	0	0	0	0	0	0	0
28	MF	(Germany) GER	Dominik Kohr	40	1	16+10	0	3+2	0	6+3	1
30	MF	(Germany) GER	Şahverdi Çetin	0	0	0	0	0	0	0	0
38	MF	(Germany) GER	Patrick Finger	0	0	0	0	0	0	0	0
42	MF	(Bosnia and Herzegovina) BIH	Marijan Ćavar	0	0	0	0	0	0	0	0
Forwards
9	FW	(Netherlands) NED	Bas Dost	30	10	16+8	8	1+1	2	2+2	0
33	FW	(Portugal) POR	André Silva	37	16	16+9	12	3	2	9	2
39	FW	(Portugal) POR	Gonçalo Paciência	43	10	15+8	7	0+4	0	9+7	3
Players transferred out during the season
3	DF	(Guinea) GUI	Simon Falette	1	0	1	0	0	0	0	0
7	FW	(Serbia) SRB	Dejan Joveljić	10	1	2+2	0	1	0	2+3	1
27	FW	(Germany) GER	Nicolai Müller	0	0	0	0	0	0	0	0
4	FW	(Croatia) CRO	Ante Rebić	6	3	1	0	1	3	3+1	0
21	MF	(Germany) GER	Marc Stendera	0	0	0	0	0	0	0	0
33	DF	(Israel) ISR	Taleb Tawatha	0	0	0	0	0	0	0	0
35	DF	(Brazil) BRA	Tuta	0	0	0	0	0	0	0	0
15	DF	(Netherlands) NED	Jetro Willems	0	0	0	0	0	0	0	0

Last updated: 6 August 2020
Source: Competitions

=== Goalscorers ===
Rank	No.	Pos.	Nat.	Name	Bundesliga	DFB-Pokal	UEFA Europa League	Total
1	33	FW	(Portugal)	André Silva	12	2	2	16
2	10	FW	(Serbia)	Filip Kostić	4	3	5	12
3	9	FW	(Netherlands)	Bas Dost	8	2	0	10
3	15	MF	(Japan)	Daichi Kamada	2	2	6	10
3	39	FW	(Portugal)	Gonçalo Paciência	7	0	3	10
6	13	DF	(Austria)	Martin Hinteregger	8	0	1	9
7	22	DF	(United States)	Timothy Chandler	5	0	0	5
8	24	DF	(Germany)	Danny da Costa	1	1	2	4
9	4	FW	(Croatia)	Ante Rebić	0	3	0	3
9	17	MF	(Germany)	Sebastian Rode	3	0	0	3
9	19	DF	(Argentina)	David Abraham	2	0	1	3
12	2	DF	(France)	Evan Ndicka	1	0	1	2
12	3	MF	(Austria)	Stefan Ilsanker	2	0	0	2
14	6	FW	(Netherlands)	Jonathan de Guzmán	0	0	1	1
14	7	FW	(Serbia)	Dejan Joveljić	0	0	1	1
14	8	MF	(Switzerland)	Djibril Sow	1	0	0	1
14	11	MF	(Serbia)	Mijat Gaćinović	0	0	1	1
14	16	MF	(Spain)	Lucas Torró	0	0	1	1
14	18	DF	(France)	Almamy Touré	1	0	0	1
14	28	MF	(Germany)	Dominik Kohr	0	0	1	1
Own goals					2	0	1	3
Totals					59	13	27	99

Last updated: 27 July 2020

=== Clean sheets ===
Rank	No.	Pos	Nat	Name	Bundesliga	DFB-Pokal	UEFA Europa League	Total
1	1	GK	(Germany)	Kevin Trapp	4	1	2	7
2	32	GK	(Denmark)	Frederik Rønnow	1	0	1	2
3	29	GK	(Germany)	Felix Wiedwald	0	0	1	1
Totals					5	1	4	10

Last updated: 17 June 2020

=== Disciplinary record ===
No.	Pos	Nat	Player	Bundesliga			DFB-Pokal			UEFA Europa League			Total		
No.	Pos	Nat	Player	Booked	(yellow card) (yellow-red card)	Sent off (straight red)	Booked	(yellow card) (yellow-red card)	Sent off (straight red)	Booked	(yellow card) (yellow-red card)	Sent off (straight red)	Booked	(yellow card) (yellow-red card)	Sent off (straight red)
Totals
1	GK	(Germany)	Kevin Trapp	1	0	0	0	0	0	0	0	0	1	0	0
2	DF	(France)	Evan Ndicka	3	0	0	0	0	0	1	0	0	4	0	0
3	DF	(Guinea)	Simon Falette	1	0	0	0	0	0	1	0	0	2	0	0
3	MF	(Austria)	Stefan Ilsanker	3	0	0	0	0	0	0	0	0	3	0	0
4	FW	(Croatia)	Ante Rebić	1	0	0	0	0	0	0	0	1	1	0	1
5	MF	(Switzerland)	Gélson Fernandes	3	1	0	0	0	0	3	0	0	6	1	0
6	MF	(Netherlands)	Jonathan de Guzmán	1	0	0	0	0	0	0	0	0	1	0	0
7	FW	(Serbia)	Dejan Joveljić	1	0	0	1	0	0	0	0	0	2	0	0
8	MF	(Switzerland)	Djibril Sow	2	0	0	0	0	0	3	0	0	5	0	0
9	FW	(Netherlands)	Bas Dost	2	0	0	0	0	0	0	0	0	2	0	0
10	MF	(Serbia)	Filip Kostić	4	0	0	1	0	1	2	0	0	7	0	1
11	MF	(Serbia)	Mijat Gaćinović	2	0	0	1	0	0	0	0	0	3	0	0
13	DF	(Austria)	Martin Hinteregger	8	0	0	3	0	0	4	0	0	15	0	0
15	DF	(Netherlands)	Jetro Willems	0	0	0	0	0	0	0	0	0	0	0	0
15	MF	(Japan)	Daichi Kamada	5	0	0	0	0	0	2	0	0	7	0	0
16	MF	(Spain)	Lucas Torró	2	1	0	0	0	0	0	0	0	2	1	0
17	MF	(Germany)	Sebastian Rode	4	0	0	2	0	0	1	0	0	7	0	0
18	DF	(Mali)	Almamy Touré	2	0	0	0	0	0	2	0	0	4	0	0
19	DF	(Argentina)	David Abraham	1	0	1	1	0	0	3	0	0	5	0	1
20	MF	(Japan)	Makoto Hasebe	3	0	0	0	0	0	3	0	0	6	0	0
21	MF	(Germany)	Marc Stendera	0	0	0	0	0	0	0	0	0	0	0	0
22	DF	(United States)	Timothy Chandler	4	0	0	0	0	0	0	0	0	4	0	0
23	DF	(Germany)	Marco Russ	0	0	0	0	0	0	0	0	0	0	0	0
24	DF	(Germany)	Danny da Costa	0	0	0	0	0	0	0	0	0	0	0	0
25	DF	(Germany)	Erik Durm	0	0	0	0	0	0	1	0	0	1	0	0
26	MF	(Germany)	Nils Stendera	0	0	0	0	0	0	0	0	0	0	0	0
27	FW	(Germany)	Nicolai Müller	0	0	0	0	0	0	0	0	0	0	0	0
28	MF	(Germany)	Dominik Kohr	5	0	1	1	0	0	1	1	0	7	1	1
29	GK	(Germany)	Felix Wiedwald	0	0	0	0	0	0	0	0	0	0	0	0
30	MF	(Germany)	Şahverdi Çetin	0	0	0	0	0	0	0	0	0	0	0	0
32	GK	(Denmark)	Frederik Rønnow	0	0	0	0	0	0	0	0	0	0	0	0
33	DF	(Israel)	Taleb Tawatha	0	0	0	0	0	0	0	0	0	0	0	0
33	FW	(Portugal)	André Silva	2	0	0	1	0	0	0	0	0	3	0	0
35	DF	(Brazil)	Tuta	0	0	0	0	0	0	0	0	0	0	0	0
37	GK	(Germany)	Jan Zimmermann	0	0	0	0	0	0	0	0	0	0	0	0
38	MF	(Germany)	Patrick Finger	0	0	0	0	0	0	0	0	0	0	0	0
39	FW	(Portugal)	Gonçalo Paciência	4	0	0	0	0	0	1	0	0	5	0	1
42	MF	(Bosnia and Herzegovina)	Marijan Ćavar	0	0	0	0	0	0	0	0	0	0	0	0
Totals				63	2	2	9	0	1	26	1	1	98	3	4

Last updated: 17 June 2020
