= 2018–19 Eintracht Frankfurt season =

Eintracht Frankfurt
2018–19 season
- President: Peter Fischer
- Chairmen: Fredi Bobič; Axel Hellmann; Oliver Frankenbach
- Manager: Adi Hütter
- Bundesliga: 7th
- DFB-Pokal: First round
- DFL-Supercup: Runners-up
- Europa League: Semi-finals
- Top goalscorer: League: Luka Jović (17 goals); All: Luka Jović (27 goals)
- Highest home attendance: 51,500
- Lowest home attendance: 43,800
- Average home league attendance: 49,794
- Biggest win: Frankfurt 7–1 Düsseldorf
- Biggest defeat: Frankfurt 0–5 Bayern; Leverkusen 6–1 Frankfurt
Home colours	Away colours	Third colours
- All statistics correct as of 25 May 2019.

The 2018–19 season was the 120th in the history of Eintracht Frankfurt, a football club based in Frankfurt, Germany. It was their 7th consecutive season and 50th overall in the top flight of German football, the Bundesliga, having been promoted from the 2. Bundesliga in 2012. In addition to the domestic league, Eintracht Frankfurt also were participating in that season's edition of the domestic cup, the DFB-Pokal. This was the 94th season for Frankfurt in the Commerzbank-Arena, located in Frankfurt, Hesse, Germany. The season covered a period from 1 July 2018 to 30 June 2019.

== Players ==
=== Squad ===
As of 16 February 2019

Note: Flags indicate national team as defined under FIFA eligibility rules; some limited exceptions apply. Players may hold more than one non-FIFA nationality.

No.	Pos.	Nation	Player
1	GK	DEN	Frederik Rønnow
2	DF	FRA	Evan Ndicka
3	DF	GUI	Simon Falette
4	MF	CRO	Ante Rebić
5	MF	SUI	Gélson Fernandes
6	MF	NED	Jonathan de Guzmán
8	FW	SRB	Luka Jović (on loan from Benfica)
9	FW	FRA	Sébastien Haller
10	MF	SRB	Filip Kostić (on loan from Hamburger SV)
11	MF	SRB	Mijat Gaćinović
13	DF	AUT	Martin Hinteregger (on loan from FC Augsburg)
15	DF	NED	Jetro Willems
16	MF	ESP	Lucas Torró
17	MF	GER	Sebastian Rode (on loan from Borussia Dortmund)
18	DF	MLI	Almamy Touré
19	DF	ARG	David Abraham
20	MF	JPN	Makoto Hasebe

No.	Pos.	Nation	Player
21	MF	GER	Marc Stendera
22	DF	USA	Timothy Chandler
23	DF	GER	Marco Russ
24	MF	GER	Danny da Costa
25	MF	GER	Patrice Kabuya
26	MF	GER	Nils Stendera
30	MF	GER	Şahverdi Çetin
31	GK	GER	Kevin Trapp (on loan from Paris Saint-Germain)
32	FW	CMR	Nelson Mandela Mbouhom
33	DF	ISR	Taleb Tawatha
34	FW	SWE	Branimir Hrgota
35	DF	BRA	Tuta
36	FW	GER	Mischa Häuser
37	GK	GER	Jan Zimmermann
38	MF	GER	Patrick Finger
39	FW	POR	Gonçalo Paciência
41	GK	GER	Tobias Stirl

=== Transfers ===
==== In ====
No.	Pos.	Name	Age	EU	Moving from	Type	Transfer Window	Contract ends	Transfer fee	Sources
1	Goalkeeper	Frederik Rønnow	25	Yes	Brøndby	Transfer	Summer	30 June 2022	€2.8 million	
2	Defender	Evan Ndicka	18	Yes	AJ Auxerre	Transfer	Summer	30 June 2023	€5.5 million	
4	Striker	Ante Rebić	24	Yes	Fiorentina, was previously loaned	Transfer	Summer	30 June 2021	€2.0 million	
10	Midfielder	Filip Kostić	25	No	Hamburger SV	Loan	Summer	30 June 2020	€1.7 million	
13	Defender	Carlos Salcedo	24	No	Guadalajara, was previously loaned	Transfer	Summer	30 June 2022	€5.0 million	
16	Midfielder	Lucas Torró	23	Yes	CA Osasuna	Transfer	Summer	30 June 2023	€3.5 million	
18	Midfielder	Max Besuschkow	21	Yes	Holstein Kiel, was previously loaned	Loan return	Summer	30 June 2020	—	
18	Midfielder	Francisco Geraldes	23	Yes	Sporting CP	Loan	Summer	30 June 2019	€200,000	
25	Midfielder	Patrice Kabuya	18	Yes	Eintracht Frankfurt U19	Academy	Summer	30 June 2019	Free	
27	Forward	Marius Wolf	23	Yes	Hannover 96, was previously loaned	Transfer	Summer	30 June 2020	€500,000	
27	Striker	Nicolai Müller	30	Yes	Hamburger SV	Free transfer	Summer	30 June 2020	—	
28	Midfielder	Allan Souza	21	No	Liverpool	Loan	Summer	30 June 2019	Undisclosed	
29	Goalkeeper	Felix Wiedwald	28	Yes	Leeds United	Transfer	Summer	30 June 2021	Free	
30	Midfielder	Şahverdi Çetin	18	Yes	Eintracht Frankfurt U19	Academy	Summer	30 June 2020	Free	
31	Goalkeeper	Kevin Trapp	28	Yes	Paris Saint-Germain	Loan	Summer	30 June 2019	Undisclosed	
36	Striker	Mischa Häuser	18	Yes	Eintracht Frankfurt U19	Academy	Summer	30 June 2019	Free	
39	Striker	Gonçalo Paciência	23	Yes	FC Porto	Transfer	Summer	30 June 2022	€3.0 million	
41	Goalkeeper	Tobias Stirl	18	Yes	Eintracht Frankfurt U19	Academy	Summer	30 June 2019	Free	
13	Defender	Martin Hinteregger	26	Yes	FC Augsburg	Loan	Winter	30 June 2019	€800,000	
17	Midfielder	Sebastian Rode	28	Yes	Borussia Dortmund	Loan	Winter	30 June 2019	Undisclosed	
18	Defender	Almamy Touré	22	Yes	AS Monaco	Transfer	Winter	30 June 2023	€750,000	
26	Midfielder	Nils Stendera	18	Yes	Eintracht Frankfurt U19	Academy	Winter	30 June 2022	Free	
35	Defender	Tuta	19	Yes	São Paulo	Transfer	Winter	30 June 2023	€1.8 million	
38	Midfielder	Patrick Finger	18	Yes	Eintracht Frankfurt U19	Academy	Winter	30 June 2020	Free	

==== Out ====
No.	Pos.	Name	Age	EU	Moving to	Type	Transfer Window	Transfer fee	Sources
1	Goalkeeper	Lukáš Hrádecký	28	Yes	Bayer Leverkusen	End of contract	Summer	Free	
7	Midfielder	Danny Blum	27	Yes	UD Las Palmas	Loan	Summer	Undisclosed	
14	Forward	Alexander Meier	35	Yes	FC St. Pauli	End of contract	Summer	Free	
17	Midfielder	Kevin-Prince Boateng	31	Yes	US Sassuolo	Transfer	Summer	Released	
18	Midfielder	Max Besuschkow	21	Yes	Union Saint-Gilloise	Loan	Summer	Undisclosed	
27	Forward	Marius Wolf	23	Yes	Borussia Dortmund	Transfer	Summer	€6.5 million	
28	Midfielder	Aymen Barkok	20	Yes	Fortuna Düsseldorf	Loan	Summer	€800,000	
29	Defender	Andersson Ordóñez	24	No	LDU de Quito	Loan	Summer	€415,000	
34	Goalkeeper	Leon Bätge	20	Yes	Würzburger Kickers	Free Transfer	Summer	—	
38	Striker	Renat Dadaşov	19	Yes	GD Estoril Praia	Transfer	Summer	Undisclosed	
39	Midfielder	Omar Mascarell	25	Yes	Real Madrid, sold on to Schalke 04	Transfer (buy back clause)	Summer	€4.0 million	
40	Midfielder	Daichi Kamada	21	No	Sint-Truidense VV	Loan	Summer	Undisclosed	
42	Midfielder	Marijan Ćavar	20	Yes	NK Osijek	Loan	Summer	Undisclosed	
7	Midfielder	Marco Fabián	29	Yes	Philadelphia Union	Transfer	Winter	Undisclosed	
13	Defender	Carlos Salcedo	25	Yes	Tigres UANL	Transfer	Winter	€8.8 million	
18	Midfielder	Francisco Geraldes	23	Yes	Sporting CP	Loan return	Winter	-	
26	Defender	Deji-Ousman Beyreuther	19	Yes	Chemnitzer FC	Loan	Winter	Undisclosed	
27	Striker	Nicolai Müller	31	Yes	Hannover 96	Loan	Winter	Undisclosed	
28	Midfielder	Allan Souza	21	No	Liverpool, loaned on to Fluminense	Loan terminated	Winter	-	
29	Goalkeeper	Felix Wiedwald	28	Yes	MSV Duisburg	Loan	Winter	Undisclosed	
35	Defender	Noel Knothe	19	Yes	FC Pipinsried	Loan	Winter	Undisclosed	

== Friendly matches ==
Win Draw Loss

5 July 2018	Offenburger FV (Germany)	1–7	(Germany) Eintracht Frankfurt	Offenburg, Germany
18:00 CEST (UTC+2)	Herrmann 44'	Report	Tawatha 16'; Gaćinović 22'; Besuschkow 24'; Kamada 29'; Leopold 39' (o.g.); Müller 51', 61'	Stadium: Karl-Heitz-Stadion; Attendance: 2,300; Referee: Brombacher

10 July 2018	Real Salt Lake (United States)	1–1	(Germany) Eintracht Frankfurt	Sandy, Utah, United States
20:00 MDT (UTC−6)	Brody 10'	Report	Müller 90'	Stadium: Rio Tinto Stadium; Attendance: 5,417; Referee: Chapman

14 July 2018	Philadelphia Union (United States)	1–0	(Germany) Eintracht Frankfurt	Chester, Pennsylvania, United States
19:00 EDT (UTC−4)	Jones 49'	Report		Stadium: Talen Energy Stadium

21 July 2018	SV Wehen Wiesbaden (Germany)	2–6	(Germany) Eintracht Frankfurt	Wiesbaden, Germany
16:00 CEST (UTC+2)	Brandstetter 17'; Mockenhaupt 62'	Report	Paciência 22'; Jović 52'; Blum 64'; Gaćinović 69', 80'; Nicolai Müller 87'	Stadium: Brita-Arena; Attendance: 5,000

27 July 2018	Eintracht Frankfurt (Germany)	0–0	(Germany) SpVgg Greuther Fürth	Frankfurt, Germany
		Report		Stadium: Commerzbank-Arena; Attendance: -
Note: Closed session without audience

1 August 2018	Empoli (Italy)	2–0	(Germany) Eintracht Frankfurt	Bruneck, Italy
18:00 CEST (UTC+2)	Caputo 38', 63' (pen.)	Report		Stadium: Sportpark Reischach

4 August 2018	SPAL (Italy)	2–1	(Germany) Eintracht Frankfurt	Gais, Italy
16:00 CEST (UTC+2)	Kurtić 65'; Moncini 90+3'	Report	Haller 24'

6 September 2018	FC Ederbergland (Germany)	0–5	(Germany) Eintracht Frankfurt	Allendorf, Germany
18:30 CEST (UTC+2)		Report	Beyreuther 24'; Paciência 24', 88'; Fabián 24', 77'	Stadium: Stadion Beetwiese; Attendance: 2,400; Referee: Rabe

11 October 2018	FC Hanau 93 (Germany)	0–13	(Germany) Eintracht Frankfurt	Hanau, Germany
18:30 CEST (UTC+2)			Knothe 31'; Stendera 36'; Hrgota 42', 58', 66', 68', 76', 82', 88', 90'; Haller 72'; Willems 84', 87'	Stadium: Herbert-Dröse-Stadion; Attendance: 4,000; Referee: Rau

10 January 2019 Florida Cup	São Paulo FC (Brazil)	1–2	(Germany) Eintracht Frankfurt	St. Petersburg, Florida, United States
19:00 EST (UTC−5)	Nenê 55'	Report	Rebić 9' (pen.); Igor Vinícius 64' (o.g.)	Stadium: Al Lang Stadium; Attendance: 2,000; Referee: Musache

12 January 2019 Florida Cup	CR Flamengo (Brazil)	1–0	(Germany) Eintracht Frankfurt	Orlando, Florida, United States
16:00 EST (UTC−5)	Jean Lucas 55'	Report		Stadium: Orlando City Stadium; Attendance: 14,500; Referee: Coric

21 March 2019	SG Heringen / Mensfelden (Germany)	0–9	(Germany) Eintracht Frankfurt	Hünfelden, Germany
18:00 CET (UTC+1)		Report	Rode 4'; Hrgota 8', 21', 42'; Haller 32', 55' (pen.), 64'; Makanda 69'; Çetin 84'	Stadium: Sportanlage am Mensfelder Kopf; Attendance: 3,000; Referee: Angermaier

24 May 2019	VfL Wolfsburg (Germany)	3–3 (2–4 p)	(Germany) Eintracht Frankfurt	Foshan, China
21:00 CST (UTC+8)	Guilavogui 16'; Rexhbeçaj 21'; Azzaoui 43'	Report	Willems 14'; Touré 45'; Jović 80'	Stadium: Century Lotus Stadium; Attendance: 13,000
	Penalties
	Guilavogui (penalty scored); Gerhardt (penalty scored); Knoche (penalty missed); Arnold (penalty scored); Klaus (penalty scored)		(penalty scored) Jović; (penalty scored) Gaćinović; (penalty missed) Hasebe; (penalty missed) Kostić

== Competitions ==
Win Draw Loss

=== Overview ===
Competition	First match	Last match	Starting round	Final position	Record							
Competition	First match	Last match	Starting round	Final position	Pld	W	D	L	GF	GA	GD	Win %
Bundesliga	25 August 2018	18 May 2019	Matchday 1	7th	34	15	9	10	60	48	+12	44.12
DFB-Pokal	18 August 2018	18 August 2018	First round	First round	1	0	0	1	1	2	−1	0.00
DFL-Supercup	12 August 2018		Final	Runners-up	1	0	0	1	0	5	−5	0.00
Europa League	20 September 2018	9 May 2019	Group stage	Semi-finals	14	9	4	1	30	14	+16	64.29
Total					50	24	13	13	91	69	+22	48.00

Last updated: 25 May 2019
Source: Competitions

=== Bundesliga ===
==== League table ====
Pos	Team	Pld	W	D	L	GF	GA	GD	Pts	Qualification or relegation
5	Borussia Mönchengladbach	34	16	7	11	55	42	+13	55	Qualification for the Europa League group stage (Note: Since the winners of the 2018–19 DFB-Pokal, Bayern Munich, qualified for the Champions League based on league position, the Europa League group stage spot was passed to the sixth-placed team, and the Europa League second qualifying round spot was passed to the seventh-placed team.)
6	VfL Wolfsburg	34	16	7	11	62	50	+12	55	Qualification for the Europa League group stage
7	Eintracht Frankfurt	34	15	9	10	60	48	+12	54	Qualification for the Europa League second qualifying round
8	Werder Bremen	34	14	11	9	58	49	+9	53	
9	1899 Hoffenheim	34	13	12	9	70	52	+18	51	

Source: DFB
Rules for classification: 1) Points; 2) Goal difference; 3) Goals scored; 4) Head-to-head results; 5) Head-to-head away goals scored; 6) Away goals scored; 7) Play-off

==== Results summary ====
Overall								Home						Away					
Pld	W	D	L	GF	GA	GD	Pts	W	D	L	GF	GA	GD	W	D	L	GF	GA	GD
34	15	9	10	60	48	+12	54	8	4	5	32	21	+11	7	5	5	28	27	+1

Last updated: 25 May 2019.
Source: Bundesliga

==== Results by round ====
Round	1	2	3	4	5	6	7	8	9	10	11	12	13	14	15	16	17	18	19	20	21	22	23	24	25	26	27	28	29	30	31	32	33	34
Ground	A	H	A	H	A	H	A	H	A	A	H	A	H	A	H	A	H	H	A	H	A	H	A	H	A	H	H	A	H	A	H	A	H	A
Result	W	L	L	D	L	W	W	W	D	W	W	W	L	L	W	D	L	W	D	D	D	D	W	W	W	W	W	W	L	D	D	L	L	L
Position	3	9	12	13	15	11	7	7	7	5	4	3	5	5	5	5	6	5	5	5	5	7	6	5	5	5	4	4	4	4	4	4	6	7

Updated to match(es) played on 25 May 2019. Source: DFB
A = Away; H = Home; W = Win; D = Draw; L = Loss

==== Matches ====
25 August 2018 1	SC Freiburg	0–2	Eintracht Frankfurt	Freiburg
15:30 CEST (UTC+2)		Report	Müller 10'; Haller 82'	Stadium: Schwarzwald-Stadion; Attendance: 24,000; Referee: Manuel Gräfe

1 September 2018 2	Eintracht Frankfurt	1–2	Werder Bremen	Frankfurt
15:30 CEST (UTC+2)	Haller 54' (pen.)	Report	Osako 20'; Rashica 90+6'	Stadium: Commerzbank-Arena; Attendance: 50,000; Referee: Sören Storks

14 September 2018 3	Borussia Dortmund	3–1	Eintracht Frankfurt	Dortmund
20:30 CEST (UTC+2)	Diallo 36'; Wolf 72'; Alcácer 88'	Report	Haller 68'	Stadium: Signal Iduna Park; Attendance: 81,000; Referee: Benjamin Cortus

23 September 2018 4	Eintracht Frankfurt	1–1	RB Leipzig	Frankfurt
18:00 CEST (UTC+2)	Fernandes 26'	Report	Forsberg 53' (pen.)	Stadium: Commerzbank-Arena; Attendance: 43,800; Referee: Felix Brych

26 September 2018 5	Borussia Mönchengladbach	3–1	Eintracht Frankfurt	Mönchengladbach
20:30 CEST (UTC+2)	Pléa 56'; Hazard 65'; Elvedi 85'	Report	Rebić 74'	Stadium: Borussia-Park; Attendance: 41,257; Referee: Sven Jablonski

30 September 2018 6	Eintracht Frankfurt	4–1	Hannover 96	Frankfurt
15:30 CEST (UTC+2)	N'Dicka 36'; Rebić 45+1'; de Guzmán 59'; Jović 89'	Report	Muslija 86'	Stadium: Commerzbank-Arena; Attendance: 46,300; Referee: Robert Hartmann

7 October 2018 7	1899 Hoffenheim	1–2	Eintracht Frankfurt	Sinsheim
15:30 CEST (UTC+2)	Nelson 82'	Report	Rebić 40'; Jović 46'	Stadium: Wirsol Rhein-Neckar-Arena; Attendance: 29,785; Referee: Daniel Siebert

19 October 2018 8	Eintracht Frankfurt	7–1	Fortuna Düsseldorf	Frankfurt
20:30 CEST (UTC+2)	Haller 20' (pen.), 50'; Jović 26', 34', 55', 69', 72'	Report	Lukebakio 53'	Stadium: Commerzbank-Arena; Attendance: 51,000; Referee: Deniz Aytekin

28 October 2018 9	1. FC Nürnberg	1–1	Eintracht Frankfurt	Nuremberg
13:30 CET (UTC+1)	Zreľák 78'	Report	Haller 90+2'	Stadium: Max-Morlock-Stadion; Attendance: 42,154; Referee: Robert Schröder

2 November 2018 10	VfB Stuttgart	0–3	Eintracht Frankfurt	Stuttgart
20:30 CET (UTC+1)		Report	Haller 11'; Rebić 32'; Müller 89'	Stadium: Mercedes-Benz Arena; Attendance: 58,016; Referee: Sven Jablonski

11 November 2018 11	Eintracht Frankfurt	3–0	Schalke 04	Frankfurt
18:00 CET (UTC+1)	Jović 61', 73'; Haller 80'	Report		Stadium: Commerzbank-Arena; Attendance: 50,700; Referee: Benjamin Cortus

24 November 2018 12	FC Augsburg	1–3	Eintracht Frankfurt	Augsburg
15:30 CET (UTC+1)	Córdova 90'	Report	de Guzmán 1'; Haller 47'; Rebić 68'	Stadium: WWK Arena; Attendance: 30,660; Referee: Felix Zwayer

2 December 2018 13	Eintracht Frankfurt	1–2	VfL Wolfsburg	Frankfurt
18:00 CET (UTC+1)	Jović 87'	Report	Mehmedi 31'; Ginczek 68'	Stadium: Commerzbank-Arena; Attendance: 48,000; Referee: Sascha Stegemann

8 December 2018 14	Hertha BSC	1–0	Eintracht Frankfurt	Berlin
18:30 CET (UTC+1)	Grujić 40'	Report		Stadium: Olympiastadion Berlin; Attendance: 42,578; Referee: Daniel Schlager

16 December 2018 15	Eintracht Frankfurt	2–1	Bayer Leverkusen	Frankfurt
18:00 CET (UTC+1)	Da Costa 28'; Kostić 57'	Report	Bellarabi 65'	Stadium: Commerzbank-Arena; Attendance: 46,500; Referee: Felix Brych

19 December 2018 16	Mainz 05	2–2	Eintracht Frankfurt	Mainz
20:30 CET (UTC+1)	Quaison 10', 36'	Report	Jović 31', 45+1'	Stadium: Opel Arena; Attendance: 30,805; Referee: Daniel Siebert

22 December 2018 17	Eintracht Frankfurt	0–3	Bayern Munich	Frankfurt
18:30 CET (UTC+1)		Report	Ribéry 35', 79'; Rafinha 89'	Stadium: Commerzbank-Arena; Attendance: 51,500; Referee: Manuel Gräfe

19 January 2019 18	Eintracht Frankfurt	3–1	SC Freiburg	Frankfurt
15:30 CET (UTC+1)	Haller 36'; Rebić 40'; Jović 45'	Report	Petersen 69'	Stadium: Commerzbank-Arena; Attendance: 49,200; Referee: Sven Jablonski

26 January 2019 19	Werder Bremen	2–2	Eintracht Frankfurt	Bremen
18:30 CET (UTC+1)	M. Eggestein 27'; Harnik 52'	Report	Rebić 35'; Haller 68' (pen.)	Stadium: Weser-Stadion; Attendance: 42,100; Referee: Markus Schmidt

2 February 2019 20	Eintracht Frankfurt	1–1	Borussia Dortmund	Frankfurt
15:30 CET (UTC+1)	Jović 36'	Report	Reus 22'	Stadium: Commerzbank-Arena; Attendance: 51,500; Referee: Felix Zwayer

9 February 2019 21	RB Leipzig	0–0	Eintracht Frankfurt	Leipzig
15:30 CET (UTC+1)		Report		Stadium: Red Bull Arena; Attendance: 38,330; Referee: Guido Winkmann

17 February 2019 22	Eintracht Frankfurt	1–1	Borussia Mönchengladbach	Frankfurt
15:30 CET (UTC+1)	Da Costa 45+1'	Report	Zakaria 82'	Stadium: Commerzbank-Arena; Attendance: 51,500; Referee: Deniz Aytekin

24 February 2019 23	Hannover 96	0–3	Eintracht Frankfurt	Hanover
15:30 CET (UTC+1)		Report	Rebić 54'; Jović 63'; Kostić 90'	Stadium: HDI-Arena; Attendance: 39,100; Referee: Marco Fritz

2 March 2019 24	Eintracht Frankfurt	3–2	1899 Hoffenheim	Frankfurt
15:30 CET (UTC+1)	Kostić 20'; Haller 89'; Paciência 90+6'	Report	Joelinton 43'; Belfodil 60'	Stadium: Commerzbank-Arena; Attendance: 49,500; Referee: Manuel Gräfe

11 March 2019 25	Fortuna Düsseldorf	0–3	Eintracht Frankfurt	Düsseldorf
20:30 CET (UTC+1)		Report	Paciência 48'; Haller 90+1', 90+3'	Stadium: Merkur Spiel-Arena; Attendance: 41,419; Referee: Robert Hartmann

17 March 2019 26	Eintracht Frankfurt	1–0	1. FC Nürnberg	Frankfurt
15:30 CET (UTC+1)	Hinteregger 31'	Report		Stadium: Commerzbank-Arena; Attendance: 51,500; Referee: Bibiana Steinhaus

31 March 2019 27	Eintracht Frankfurt	3–0	VfB Stuttgart	Frankfurt
18:00 CEST (UTC+2)	Kostić 45', 64'; Jović 84'	Report		Stadium: Commerzbank-Arena; Attendance: 51,500; Referee: Felix Brych

6 April 2019 28	Schalke 04	1–2	Eintracht Frankfurt	Gelsenkirchen
15:30 CEST (UTC+2)	Serdar 21'	Report	Rebić 13'; Jović 90+9' (pen.)	Stadium: Veltins-Arena; Attendance: 61,842; Referee: Sascha Stegemann

14 April 2019 29	Eintracht Frankfurt	1–3	FC Augsburg	Frankfurt
18:00 CEST (UTC+2)	Paciência 14'	Report	Richter 31', 45+4'; Gregoritsch 84'	Stadium: Commerzbank-Arena; Attendance: 51,000; Referee: Bastian Dankert

22 April 2019 30	VfL Wolfsburg	1–1	Eintracht Frankfurt	Wolfsburg
20:30 CEST (UTC+2)	Brooks 90'	Report	de Guzmán 78'	Stadium: Volkswagen Arena; Attendance: 26,102; Referee: Marco Fritz

27 April 2019 31	Eintracht Frankfurt	0–0	Hertha BSC	Frankfurt
15:30 CEST (UTC+2)		Report		Stadium: Commerzbank-Arena; Attendance: 51,500; Referee: Sven Jablonski

5 May 2019 32	Bayer Leverkusen	6–1	Eintracht Frankfurt	Leverkusen
18:00 CEST (UTC+2)	Havertz 2'; Brandt 13'; Alario 23', 34'; Aránguiz 28'; Hinteregger 36' (o.g.)	Report	Kostić 14'	Stadium: BayArena; Attendance: 30,210; Referee: Robert Hartmann

12 May 2019 33	Eintracht Frankfurt	0–2	Mainz 05	Frankfurt
18:00 CEST (UTC+2)		Report	Ujah 53', 57'	Stadium: Commerzbank-Arena; Attendance: 51,500; Referee: Harm Osmers
Note: The Eintracht Frankfurt v Mainz 05 match, originally scheduled for 11 May 2019, 15:30 CEST, was moved to the following day due to Eintracht Frankfurt's participation in the semi-finals of the UEFA Europa League.

18 May 2019 34	Bayern Munich	5–1	Eintracht Frankfurt	Munich
15:30 CEST (UTC+2)	Coman 4'; Alaba 53'; Sanches 58'; Ribéry 72'; Robben 78'	Report	Haller 50'	Stadium: Allianz Arena; Attendance: 75,000; Referee: Sascha Stegemann

=== DFB-Pokal ===
18 August 2018 First round	SSV Ulm	2–1	Eintracht Frankfurt	Ulm
15:30 CEST (UTC+2)	Kienle 48'; Lux 75'	Report	Paciência 90'	Stadium: Donaustadion; Attendance: 18,440; Referee: Timo Gerach

=== DFL-Supercup ===
12 August 2018 Final	Eintracht Frankfurt	0–5	Bayern Munich	Frankfurt
20:30 CEST (UTC+2)		Report	Lewandowski 21', 26', 54'; Coman 63'; Thiago 85'	Stadium: Commerzbank-Arena; Attendance: 51,500; Referee: Marco Fritz

=== UEFA Europa League ===
==== Group stage ====
Pos	Team	Pld	W	D	L	GF	GA	GD	Pts	Qualification	FRA	LAZ	APL	MAR
1	(Germany) Eintracht Frankfurt	6	6	0	0	17	5	+12	18	Advance to knockout phase	—	4–1	2–0	4–0
2	(Italy) Lazio	6	3	0	3	9	11	−2	9	Advance to knockout phase	1–2	—	2–1	2–1
3	(Cyprus) Apollon Limassol	6	2	1	3	10	10	0	7		2–3	2–0	—	2–2
4	(France) Marseille	6	0	1	5	6	16	−10	1		1–2	1–3	1–3	—

Source: UEFA
Rules for classification: Group stage tiebreakers

20 September 2018 1	Marseille (France)	1–2	(Germany) Eintracht Frankfurt	Marseille, France
18:55 CEST (UTC+2)	Ocampos 3'	Report	Torró 52'; Jović 89'	Stadium: Stade Vélodrome; Attendance: 0 Referee: Matej Jug (Slovenia)

4 October 2018 2	Eintracht Frankfurt (Germany)	4–1	(Italy) Lazio	Frankfurt, Germany
21:00 CEST (UTC+2)	Da Costa 4', 90+4'; Kostić 28'; Jović 52'	Report	Parolo 23'	Stadium: Commerzbank-Arena; Attendance: 47,000; Referee: Serdar Gözübüyük (Netherlands)

25 October 2018 3	Eintracht Frankfurt (Germany)	2–0	(Cyprus) Apollon Limassol	Frankfurt, Germany
21:00 CEST (UTC+2)	Kostić 13'; Haller 32'	Report		Stadium: Commerzbank-Arena; Attendance: 47,000; Referee: Sergey Ivanov (Russia)

8 November 2018 4	Apollon Limassol (Cyprus)	2–3	(Germany) Eintracht Frankfurt	Nicosia, Cyprus
19:55 EET (UTC+2); 18:55 CET (UTC+1)	Zelaya 71', 90+4' (pen.)	Report	Jović 17'; Haller 55'; Gaćinović 58'	Stadium: GSP Stadium; Attendance: 6,888; Referee: Tiago Martins (Portugal)

29 November 2018 5	Eintracht Frankfurt (Germany)	4–0	(France) Marseille	Frankfurt, Germany
21:00 CET (UTC+1)	Jović 2', 67'; Luiz Gustavo 17' (o.g.); Sarr 62' (o.g.)	Report		Stadium: Commerzbank-Arena; Attendance: 47,000; Referee: John Beaton (Scotland)

13 December 2018 6	Lazio (Italy)	1–2	(Germany) Eintracht Frankfurt	Rome, Italy
18:55 CET (UTC+1)	Correa 56'	Report	Gaćinović 65'; Haller 71'	Stadium: Stadio Olimpico; Attendance: 18,252; Referee: Halil Umut Meler (Turkey)

==== Knockout phase ====
===== Round of 32 =====
14 February 2019 First leg	Shakhtar Donetsk (Ukraine)	2–2	(Germany) Eintracht Frankfurt	Kharkiv, Ukraine
22:00 EET (UTC+2); 21:00 CET (UTC+1)	Marlos 10' (pen.); Taison 67'	Report	Hinteregger 7'; Kostić 50'	Stadium: Metalist Stadium; Attendance: 13,059; Referee: Anthony Taylor (England)

21 February 2019 Second leg	Eintracht Frankfurt (Germany)	4–1 (6–3 agg.)	(Ukraine) Shakhtar Donetsk	Frankfurt, Germany
18:55 CET (UTC+1)	Jović 23'; Haller 27' (pen.), 80'; Rebić 88'	Report	Moraes 64'	Stadium: Commerzbank-Arena; Attendance: 47,000; Referee: Antonio Mateu Lahoz (Spain)

===== Round of 16 =====
7 March 2019 First leg	Eintracht Frankfurt (Germany)	0–0	(Italy) Internazionale	Frankfurt, Germany
18:55 CET (UTC+1)		Report		Stadium: Commerzbank-Arena; Attendance: 48,000; Referee: Willie Collum (Scotland)

14 March 2019 Second leg	Internazionale (Italy)	0–1 (0–1 agg.)	(Germany) Eintracht Frankfurt	Milan, Italy
21:00 CET (UTC+1)		Report	Jović 6'	Stadium: San Siro; Attendance: 49,866; Referee: Ovidiu Hațegan (Romania)

===== Quarter-finals =====
11 April 2019 First leg	Benfica (Portugal)	4–2	(Germany) Eintracht Frankfurt	Lisbon, Portugal
20:00 WEST (UTC+1); 21:00 CEST (UTC+2)	Félix 21' (pen.), 43', 54'; Dias 50'	Report	Jović 40'; Paciência 72'	Stadium: Estádio da Luz; Attendance: 54,175; Referee: Anthony Taylor (England)

18 April 2019 Second leg	Eintracht Frankfurt (Germany)	2–0 (4a–4 agg.)	(Portugal) Benfica	Frankfurt, Germany
21:00 CEST (UTC+2)	Kostić 37'; Rode 67'	Report		Stadium: Commerzbank-Arena; Attendance: 48,000; Referee: Daniele Orsato (Italy)

===== Semi-finals =====
2 May 2019 First leg	Eintracht Frankfurt (Germany)	1–1	(England) Chelsea	Frankfurt, Germany
21:00 CEST (UTC+2)	Jović 23'	Report	Pedro 45'	Stadium: Commerzbank-Arena; Attendance: 48,000; Referee: Carlos del Cerro Grande (Spain)

9 May 2019 Second leg	Chelsea (England)	1–1 (a.e.t.) (2–2 agg.) (4–3 p)	(Germany) Eintracht Frankfurt	London, England
21:00 CEST (UTC+2); 20:00 BST (UTC+1)	Loftus-Cheek 28'	Report	Jović 49'	Stadium: Stamford Bridge; Attendance: 36,070; Referee: Ovidiu Hațegan (Romania)
	Penalties
	Barkley (penalty scored); Azpilicueta (penalty missed); Jorginho (penalty scored); Luiz (penalty scored); Hazard (penalty scored)		(penalty scored) Haller; (penalty scored) Jović; (penalty scored) de Guzmán; (penalty missed) Hinteregger; (penalty missed) Paciência

== Statistics ==
=== Appearances and goals ===
No.	Pos	Nat	Player	Total		Bundesliga		DFB-Pokal		DFL-Supercup		UEFA Europa League	
No.	Pos	Nat	Player	Apps	Goals	Apps	Goals	Apps	Goals	Apps	Goals	Apps	Goals
Goalkeepers
1	GK	(Denmark) DEN	Frederik Rønnow	6	0	1+1	0	1	0	1	0	2	0
31	GK	(Germany) GER	Kevin Trapp	45	0	33	0	0	0	0	0	12	0
37	GK	(Germany) GER	Jan Zimmermann	0	0	0	0	0	0	0	0	0	0
41	GK	(Germany) GER	Tobias Stirl	0	0	0	0	0	0	0	0	0	0
Defenders
2	DF	(France) FRA	Evan Ndicka	36	1	24+3	1	0	0	0	0	8+1	0
3	DF	(Guinea) GUI	Simon Falette	14	0	7	0	0	0	0	0	6+1	0
13	DF	(Austria) AUT	Martin Hinteregger	21	2	14	1	0	0	0	0	7	1
15	DF	(Netherlands) NED	Jetro Willems	36	0	7+16	0	1	0	1	0	5+6	0
18	DF	(Mali) MLI	Almamy Touré	7	0	6+1	0	0	0	0	0	0	0
19	DF	(Argentina) ARG	David Abraham	27	0	17	0	1	0	1	0	8	0
22	DF	(United States) USA	Timothy Chandler	1	0	0+1	0	0	0	0	0	0	0
23	DF	(Germany) GER	Marco Russ	9	0	3+2	0	0	0	0	0	3+1	0
24	DF	(Germany) GER	Danny da Costa	50	4	34	2	1	0	1	0	14	2
33	DF	(Israel) ISR	Taleb Tawatha	6	0	1+2	0	0	0	0	0	2+1	0
35	DF	(Brazil) BRA	Tuta	0	0	0	0	0	0	0	0	0	0
Midfielders
5	MF	(Switzerland) SUI	Gelson Fernandes	37	1	28	1	0	0	0	0	9	0
6	MF	(Netherlands) NED	Jonathan de Guzmán	39	3	17+11	3	1	0	1	0	3+6	0
10	MF	(Serbia) SRB	Filip Kostić	46	10	33+1	6	0	0	0	0	11+1	4
11	MF	(Serbia) SRB	Mijat Gaćinović	45	2	16+13	0	1	0	1	0	13+1	2
16	MF	(Spain) ESP	Lucas Torró	13	1	6+2	0	1	0	1	0	2+1	1
17	MF	(Germany) GER	Sebastian Rode	20	1	12	0	0	0	0	0	8	1
20	MF	(Japan) JPN	Makoto Hasebe	44	0	28	0	1	0	1	0	14	0
21	MF	(Germany) GER	Marc Stendera	11	0	0+7	0	0	0	0	0	1+3	0
25	MF	(Germany) GER	Patrice Kabuya	0	0	0	0	0	0	0	0	0	0
26	MF	(Germany) GER	Nils Stendera	0	0	0	0	0	0	0	0	0	0
30	MF	(Germany) GER	Şahverdi Çetin	0	0	0	0	0	0	0	0	0	0
38	MF	(Germany) GER	Patrick Finger	0	0	0	0	0	0	0	0	0	0
Forwards
4	FW	(Croatia) CRO	Ante Rebić	35	10	23+5	9	0	0	0+1	0	4+2	1
8	FW	(Serbia) SRB	Luka Jović	48	27	25+7	17	1	0	0+1	0	11+3	10
9	FW	(France) FRA	Sébastien Haller	41	20	23+6	15	1	0	1	0	9+1	5
32	FW	(Cameroon) CMR	Nelson Mandela Mbouhom	0	0	0	0	0	0	0	0	0	0
34	FW	(Sweden) SWE	Branimir Hrgota	1	0	0+1	0	0	0	0	0	0	0
36	FW	(Germany) GER	Mischa Häuser	0	0	0	0	0	0	0	0	0	0
39	FW	(Portugal) POR	Gonçalo Paciência	18	5	4+7	3	0+1	1	0	0	0+6	1
Players transferred out during the season
7	MF	(Germany) GER	Danny Blum	2	0	0	0	0+1	0	0+1	0	0	0
7	MF	(Mexico) MEX	Marco Fabián	2	0	1	0	0	0	1	0	0	0
13	DF	(Mexico) MEX	Carlos Salcedo	8	0	6	0	1	0	1	0	0	0
18	MF	(Portugal) POR	Francisco Geraldes	0	0	0	0	0	0	0	0	0	0
26	DF	(Germany) GER	Deji-Ousman Beyreuther	0	0	0	0	0	0	0	0	0	0
27	FW	(Germany) GER	Nicolai Müller	12	2	3+4	2	0+1	0	0	0	1+3	0
28	MF	(Brazil) BRA	Allan Souza	4	0	2+2	0	0	0	0	0	0	0
29	GK	(Germany) GER	Felix Wiedwald	0	0	0	0	0	0	0	0	0	0
35	DF	(Germany) GER	Noel Knothe	0	0	0	0	0	0	0	0	0	0
40	MF	(Japan) JPN	Daichi Kamada	0	0	0	0	0	0	0	0	0	0
42	MF	(Bosnia and Herzegovina) BIH	Marijan Ćavar	0	0	0	0	0	0	0	0	0	0

Last updated: 18 May 2019
Source: Competitions

=== Goalscorers ===
Rank	No.	Pos	Nat	Name	Bundesliga	DFB-Pokal	UEFA Europa League	Total
1	8	FW	(Serbia)	Luka Jović	17	0	10	27
2	9	FW	(France)	Sébastien Haller	14	0	5	19
3	4	FW	(Croatia)	Ante Rebić	9	0	1	10
3	10	MF	(Serbia)	Filip Kostić	6	0	4	10
5	39	FW	(Portugal)	Gonçalo Paciência	3	1	1	5
6	24	DF	(Germany)	Danny da Costa	2	0	2	4
7	6	MF	(Netherlands)	Jonathan de Guzmán	3	0	0	3
8	27	FW	(Germany)	Nicolai Müller	2	0	0	2
8	11	MF	(Serbia)	Mijat Gaćinović	0	0	2	2
8	13	DF	(Austria)	Martin Hinteregger	1	0	1	2
11	2	DF	(France)	Evan Ndicka	1	0	0	1
11	5	MF	(Switzerland)	Gelson Fernandes	1	0	0	1
11	16	MF	(Spain)	Lucas Torró	0	0	1	1
11	16	MF	(Germany)	Sebastian Rode	0	0	1	1
Own goals					0	0	2	2
Totals					59	1	30	90

Last updated: 9 May 2019

=== Clean sheets ===
Rank	No.	Pos	Nat	Name	Bundesliga	DFB-Pokal	UEFA Europa League	Total
1	31	GK	(Germany)	Kevin Trapp	8	0	4	12
2	1	GK	(Denmark)	Frederik Rønnow	1	0	1	2
Totals					9	0	5	14

Last updated: 9 May 2019

=== Disciplinary record ===
No.	Pos.	Nat.	Name	Bundesliga			DFB-Pokal			UEFA Europa League			Total		
No.	Pos.	Nat.	Name	Yellow card	(yellow card) (yellow-red card)	Red card	Yellow card	(yellow card) (yellow-red card)	Red card	Yellow card	(yellow card) (yellow-red card)	Red card	Yellow card	(yellow card) (yellow-red card)	Red card
Totals
1	GK	(Denmark)	Frederik Rønnow	0	0	0	0	0	0	0	0	0	0	0	0
2	DF	(France)	Evan Ndicka	3	0	0	0	0	0	1	0	1	4	0	1
3	DF	(Guinea)	Simon Falette	0	0	0	0	0	0	2	0	0	2	0	0
4	FW	(Croatia)	Ante Rebić	2	1	0	0	0	0	3	0	0	5	1	0
5	MF	(Switzerland)	Gélson Fernandes	8	0	0	0	0	0	2	0	0	10	0	0
6	MF	(Netherlands)	Jonathan de Guzmán	3	0	0	0	0	0	1	0	0	4	0	0
7	MF	(Mexico)	Marco Fabián	0	0	0	0	0	0	0	0	0	0	0	0
7	MF	(Germany)	Danny Blum	0	0	0	0	0	0	0	0	0	0	0	0
8	FW	(Serbia)	Luka Jović	0	0	0	0	0	0	1	0	0	1	0	0
9	FW	(France)	Sébastien Haller	3	0	0	0	0	0	1	0	0	4	0	0
10	MF	(Serbia)	Filip Kostić	3	0	0	0	0	0	3	0	0	6	0	0
11	MF	(Serbia)	Mijat Gaćinović	3	0	0	1	0	0	1	0	0	5	0	0
13	DF	(Mexico)	Carlos Salcedo	3	0	0	1	0	0	0	0	0	4	0	0
13	DF	(Austria)	Martin Hinteregger	1	0	0	0	0	0	0	0	0	1	0	0
15	DF	(Netherlands)	Jetro Willems	2	0	1	0	0	0	1	1	0	3	1	1
16	MF	(Spain)	Lucas Torró	1	0	0	0	0	0	0	0	0	1	0	0
17	MF	(Germany)	Sebastian Rode	3	0	0	0	0	0	1	0	0	4	0	0
18	MF	(Portugal)	Francisco Geraldes	0	0	0	0	0	0	0	0	0	0	0	0
18	DF	(Mali)	Almamy Touré	0	0	0	0	0	0	0	0	0	0	0	0
19	DF	(Argentina)	David Abraham	1	0	0	0	0	0	2	0	0	3	0	0
20	MF	(Japan)	Makoto Hasebe	3	0	0	1	0	0	2	0	0	6	0	0
21	MF	(Germany)	Marc Stendera	0	0	0	0	0	0	1	1	0	1	1	0
22	DF	(United States)	Timothy Chandler	0	0	0	0	0	0	0	0	0	0	0	0
23	DF	(Germany)	Marco Russ	2	0	0	0	0	0	1	0	0	3	0	0
24	DF	(Germany)	Danny da Costa	1	0	0	0	0	0	0	0	0	1	0	0
25	MF	(Germany)	Patrice Kabuya	0	0	0	0	0	0	0	0	0	0	0	0
26	DF	(Germany)	Deji-Ousman Beyreuther	0	0	0	0	0	0	0	0	0	0	0	0
26	MF	(Germany)	Nils Stendera	0	0	0	0	0	0	0	0	0	0	0	0
27	FW	(Germany)	Nicolai Müller	1	0	0	0	0	0	0	0	0	0	0	0
28	MF	(Brazil)	Allan Souza	1	0	0	0	0	0	0	0	0	1	0	0
29	GK	(Germany)	Felix Wiedwald	0	0	0	0	0	0	0	0	0	0	0	0
30	MF	(Germany)	Şahverdi Çetin	0	0	0	0	0	0	0	0	0	0	0	0
31	GK	(Germany)	Kevin Trapp	2	0	0	0	0	0	1	0	0	3	0	0
32	FW	(Cameroon)	Nelson Mandela Mbouhom	0	0	0	0	0	0	0	0	0	0	0	0
33	DF	(Israel)	Taleb Tawatha	0	0	0	0	0	0	0	0	0	0	0	0
34	FW	(Sweden)	Branimir Hrgota	0	0	0	0	0	0	0	0	0	0	0	0
35	DF	(Germany)	Noel Knothe	0	0	0	0	0	0	0	0	0	0	0	0
35	DF	(Brazil)	Tuta	0	0	0	0	0	0	0	0	0	0	0	0
36	FW	(Germany)	Mischa Häuser	0	0	0	0	0	0	0	0	0	0	0	0
37	GK	(Germany)	Jan Zimmermann	0	0	0	0	0	0	0	0	0	0	0	0
38	MF	(Germany)	Patrick Finger	0	0	0	0	0	0	0	0	0	0	0	0
39	FW	(Portugal)	Gonçalo Paciência	0	0	0	1	0	0	0	0	0	1	0	0
40	MF	(Japan)	Daichi Kamada	0	0	0	0	0	0	0	0	0	0	0	0
41	GK	(Germany)	Tobias Stirl	0	0	0	0	0	0	0	0	0	0	0	0
42	MF	(Bosnia and Herzegovina)	Marijan Ćavar	0	0	0	0	0	0	0	0	0	0	0	0
Totals				56	1	1	4	0	0	24	2	1	84	3	2

Last updated: 18 April 2019
