= Cakar =

Cakar may be a Turkish surname Çakar or South Slavic surname Čakar. Notable people with the surname include:

- Abdulkerim Çakar, German professional footballer
- Ahmet Çakar, Turkish doctor, sportscaster, actor and a former football referee
- Damir Čakar, Montenegrin footballer
- Önder Çakar, Turkish screenwriter, producer and actor
