= Jonathan de Guzmán =

Netherlands international footballer (born 1987)

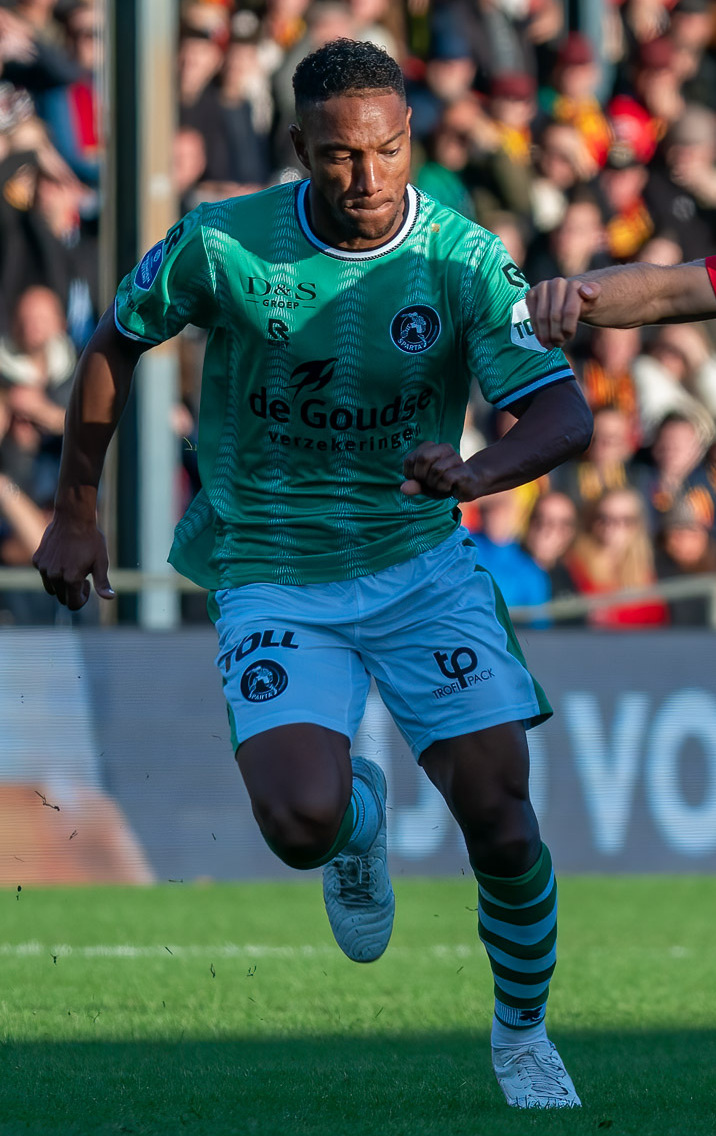
- De Guzmán in 2023 with Sparta Rotterdam

Personal information
- Full name: Jonathan Alexander de Guzmán
- Date of birth: 13 September 1987 (age 39)
- Place of birth: Scarborough, Ontario, Canada
- Height: 1.73 m (5 ft 8 in)
- Position: Midfielder

Youth career
- North Scarborough SC
- 1999–2005: Feyenoord

Senior career*
Years	Team	Apps	(Gls)
2005–2010	Feyenoord	109	(23)
2010–2011	Mallorca	34	(6)
2011–2014	Villarreal	20	(0)
2012–2014	→ Swansea City (loan)	71	(9)
2014–2017	Napoli	23	(3)
2016	→ Carpi (loan)	5	(1)
2016–2017	→ Chievo (loan)	27	(2)
2017–2020	Eintracht Frankfurt	52	(3)
2020–2022	OFI	42	(5)
2022–2026	Sparta Rotterdam	60	(3)

International career
2008	Netherlands U21	4	(3)
2013–2015	Netherlands	14	(0)
Medal record
Men's football
Representing Netherlands
FIFA World Cup
Third place	2014
- * Club domestic league appearances and goals

Jonathan Alexander de Guzmán (born 13 September 1987) is a former professional footballer who played as a midfielder.

De Guzmán is Canadian-born, but made himself available for the Netherlands after he gained Dutch citizenship in 2008, having lived in the country since the age of 12. He progressed through the Feyenoord Academy, making his first team debut in 2005 and went on to play over 100 matches for the club from Rotterdam. In the summer of 2010 de Guzmán signed a three-year contract with Mallorca following a free transfer. The following summer he was purchased by Villarreal.

Internationally, he was capped four times for the Netherlands U21 team, scoring three goals and playing in the 2008 Summer Olympics in Beijing. Later, he went on to become a full international, making 14 appearances for the senior Netherlands side between 2013 and 2015.

In 2014, De Guzmán was described as a player with good technique, vision, and shooting ability from distance; he is also known as a free-kick specialist.

== Early life ==
De Guzmán was born in the Toronto suburb of Scarborough, Ontario and is of Jamaican and Filipino descent. His father Bobby, from the Philippines, and mother Pauline, from Jamaica, came to Canada when they were ten years old and have three children: a daughter Jenelle and the two sons Jonathan and Julian. De Guzmán's older brother, Julian de Guzman, is also a former professional football player who retired as the most capped player for the Canada men's national soccer team and was the general manager at Ottawa Fury from 2017 until 2019. Julian was the first Canadian to play in La Liga.

De Guzmán's childhood was completely focused on football. His father first wanted his sons to play basketball, but due to the brothers' short height, they started to concentrate on other sports. Once they started playing football, the brothers fell in love with the sport completely: "After school, all we did was playing football. That was pretty unusual in Canada, because almost nobody of our age did it. Canada is not a football country; we were exceptions." He attended St. Rose of Lima in his early years.

== Club career ==
=== Youth career ===
Like his brother, De Guzmán started his youth career at North Scarborough Soccer Club in Canada, training six times a week to improve his skills. Julian left Canada to join Olympique Marseille's youth academy and two years later, at the age of 12, Jonathan followed him to Europe, joining the Feyenoord youth academy in the Netherlands. Upon his arrival in Rotterdam, de Guzmán was taken in to the home of an employee of the club; he later stated, "I was basically her son for three years." At fifteen, he moved into a dormitory at Feyenoord, remaining there at weekends when his peers returned to their families in other parts of the Netherlands.

=== Feyenoord ===
==== The rise ====
De Guzmán was not allowed to play for Feyenoord's first team before he was 18 years old. On 15 September 2005, three days after turning 18, de Guzmán was part of Feyenoord's first team squad for the first time. However, he remained on the bench in the UEFA Cup home match against Rapid Bucharest (1–1). Three days later, on 18 September 2005, de Guzmán made his official Feyenoord debut in the Eredivisie home match against SC Heerenveen (5–1). He replaced Ghaly in the 87th minute. De Guzmán scored his first professional goal on 30 September 2005, in the Eredivisie away match against Willem II (1–3). After his debut against SC Heerenveen, De Guzmán quickly became a first team regular. On 11 December 2005, he received much praise after outplaying former Barcelona player Philip Cocu in a midfield battle at Feyenoord's Eredivisie home match win against PSV (1–0). De Guzmán finished the Eredivisie season 2005–06 with 29 matches, scoring 4 goals. On 29 December 2005, he signed an improved contract with Feyenoord until summer 2010. His old contract was set to expire in 2008.

==== Initial difficulties ====
At the beginning of the season 2006–07, Feyenoord sold their star players Dirk Kuyt to Liverpool and Salomon Kalou to Chelsea. Management had high expectations of de Guzmán, who was ready to make the next step in his development. However, the youngster couldn't prevent the club from finishing on a 7th Eredivisie place. De Guzmán's disappointing season ended with a red card in the 21st minute of the first playoff match against FC Groningen on 10 May 2007. Feyenoord lost the double confrontation and missed out on European football for the first time in 16 years. At the end of the season, De Guzmán acknowledged there was perhaps too much pressure on him: "I was only 19 years old, I couldn't just tell everyone what to do. It was really a disappointing season. I didn't make progress as a football player, but I did grow mentally because of all the problems we had. It was a very tough season for me personally."

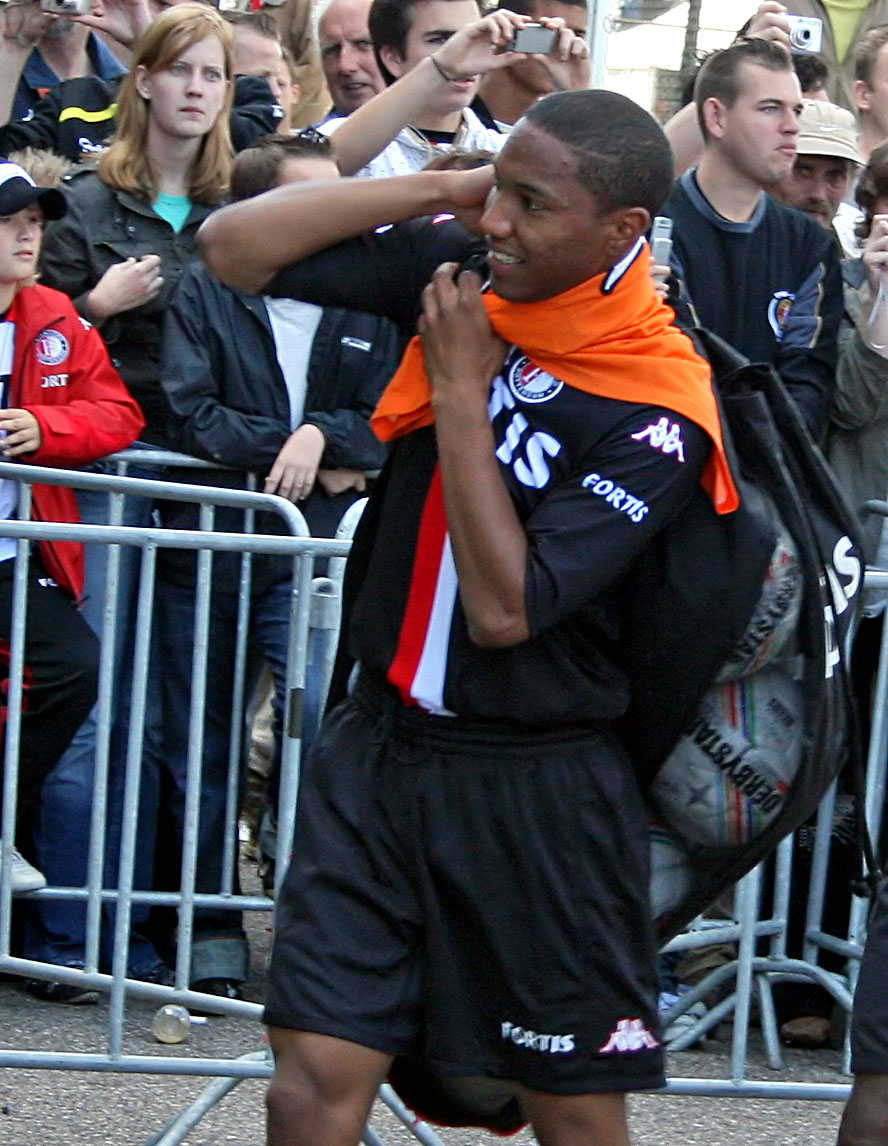
Jonathan de Guzmán after the first Feyenoord training of the season 2007–08

With the 2007–08 arrival of experienced players like Giovanni van Bronckhorst from Barcelona and Roy Makaay from Bayern Munich, Feyenoord created the perfect circumstances for de Guzmán. The pressure on the youngster was taken away, however de Guzmán wasn't too happy with his new position in the team. Where de Guzmán always played as a midfielder, new manager Bert van Marwijk placed him on the right wing position in a 4–2–3–1 system. De Guzmán played 33 Eredivisie matches, scoring nine goals.

==== Injuries ====
De Guzmán had a personal agreement with Manchester City, but Feyenoord could not agree on a transfer fee with the Citizens: "Last summer, I assumed that I would depart from Rotterdam That eventually fell through, at that time was mainly to Feyenoord. Personally, I already said yes and I thought it was quite a nice sum (reportedly ten million, ed.). But the clubs were not there and later took another City player, Shaun Wright-Phillips."

Despite a turbulent pre-season full of transfer speculations, De Guzmán remained at Feyenoord. However, De Guzmán also had a disappointing start to the season, as he was sent off in Feyenoord's season opening Eredivisie match. On 31 August 2008, De Guzmán received a red card for a flying elbow in the 30th minute in the away match against Heracles Almelo (3–1), resulting in a suspension of four matches. Not much later, De Guzmán started having physical problems. What started with minor groin, thigh and knee injuries, ended with a serious meniscus surgery in January 2009. He was out for the rest of the season. Due to his injuries, he only played two Eredivisie matches in the 2008–09 season.

De Guzmán made his comeback in the 2009–10 pre-season friendly away match against Sporting Portugal (1–2), scoring the equalizer. Due to his expiring contract, Feyenoord was keen to sell their youth product in the summer. However, new Feyenoord manager Mario Been wanted De Guzmán to stay. He stated De Guzmán was an important player for the team and was willing to let him play on his favorite central playmaker position. Despite interest from Chelsea and Valencia, De Guzmán stayed at Feyenoord.

After a promising start of the season, scoring three goals in his first nine matches, injuries kept following the midfielder. On 3 October 2009, De Guzmán was subs cartilage in the right knee, needed surgical intervention and was out for over two months. He made his comeback after the winter break, but after playing four more matches, he had to leave a training session injured on 4 March 2010. He was struck by the same injury as he had earlier this season, only this time on his left knee. De Guzmán made his final comeback in Feyenoord's last match of the season. However, he could not prevent Feyenoord losing the KNVB Cup final against arch rivals Ajax (1–4) on 6 May 2010, and left the club on a free transfer: "For me personally it's nice that I am fit again and still could get some playing time during the finals, but the result is very disappointing obviously. It's very sad I have to leave Feyenoord this way."

=== Mallorca ===
On 27 July 2010, de Guzmán signed a three-year contract with Mallorca. He cited the amount of faith shown in him from club owner Lorenzo Serra Ferrer and manager Michael Laudrup for making the move, despite the club's expulsion from the UEFA Europa League for financial reasons. De Guzmán made his debut for the club and performed brilliantly in a 0–0 draw against Real Madrid 29 August 2010. Three weeks later de Guzmán scored his first goal in La Liga in a 2–0 home win against Osasuna. On 18 December 2010 de Guzmán scored a stunning goal to tie game in the 28th minute against Villarreal, although the game finished in a 3–1 Villarreal victory. De Guzmán had a very strong first season in Spain although his team finished in 17th place one out of relegation. De Guzmán made 33 league starts while scoring 5 goals, including one in the last game of the season against Atlético Madrid in a 4–3 loss in which Atlético Madrid's Sergio Agüero scored a hat-trick. After a summer filled with speculation on de Guzmán transferring to Villarreal, Jonathan played in Mallorca's first game of the season on 28 August 2011 against Espanyol, scoring the lone goal in a 1–0 home victory over the Catalonia team.

=== Villarreal ===
On 31 August 2011, hours before the transfer deadline Villarreal completed a transfer for de Guzmán, the deal was for an undisclosed fee believed to be worth around €8.5 million. De Guzmán made his debut on 10 September as a second half sub for Javier Camuñas during a 2–2 home draw against Sevilla. Days later de Guzmán made his return to European competition since his move to Spain on 14 September against Bayern Munich in a 2–0 defeat in the first game of the UEFA Champions League group stage. De Guzmán scored his first goal for Villarreal on 22 November against Bayern Munich, the game ended in a 3–1 away defeat in the second last match in the Champions League group stage. After receiving consistent playing time after joining the club in both league and domestic play de Guzmán began to struggle to find playing time under newly hired manager José Francisco Molina in early 2012, and rumors started about a potential move back to the Eredivisie.

==== Loan to Swansea City ====
On 10 July 2012, de Guzmán completed a move to Swansea City on loan thus being reunited with former coach Michael Laudrup. He made his début against Queens Park Rangers in a 5–0 win at Loftus Road. He scored his first goal for Swansea in a 3–1 League Cup win over Liverpool at Anfield on 31 October 2012. De Guzmán scored his first goal in the Premier League and for Swansea on 17 November against Newcastle United, the game ended in a 2–1 away victory for the Swans. De Guzmán's second league goal for Swansea came in a 2–1 win over Fulham at Craven Cottage on 29 December, scoring the winning goal for the away side.

On 19 January 2013, de Guzmán netted two goals against Stoke City as they won 3–1 at home, his first was from a wonderful free-kick and his second came off of an assist from Danny Graham. He scored another brace in Swansea's 5–0 League Cup Final defeat of Bradford City at Wembley on 24 February 2013, guiding the Swans to their first ever major piece of silverware. Following a successful debut campaign in the Premier League, de Guzmán was awarded the Swansea Goal of the Season for his strike against Stoke City on 19 January. De Guzmán agreed to a second season on loan at Swansea. On 19 September, his 30-yard (27 m) free kick completed Swansea's 3–0 win away to Valencia in the Europa League group stage.

=== Napoli ===
On 20 August 2014, de Guzmán transferred to Serie A club Napoli, signing a four-year contract.

He made his debut as the team began their league campaign on 31 August away to Genoa, replacing Marek Hamšík after 74 minutes and scoring the winning goal in the 5th and last minute of extra time.

On 6 November 2014, he scored a hat-trick in a 3–0 win at San Paolo against Young Boys in the group stage of the Europa League.

In the same year, 22 December, he won as a protagonist his first trophy with the light blue jersey, the prestigious Italian SuperCoppa, after a long and breathtaking series of penalties following the 2–2 final result (1–1 in regular time) against the historical rivals of Juventus. A match in which, as a left winger, following a brilliant dribble he served the assist that allowed Gonzalo Higuaín to equalize the score after the goal by Carlos Tevez that had given Juventus the lead.

In the first Italian season he collected 36 appearances and 7 goals between league and cups.

In March 2015, de Guzmán first noticed abdominal pains. He was told by the Napoli club doctor to rest, but the pains did not improve. Consequently, he was excluded from the first-team squad, sidelined from training and asked to leave the club on loan. He has made claims that club medical staff thought he was lying about his symptoms and that he was punched in the face by Napoli's technical director, Cristiano Giuntoli, as a result of his refusal to leave the club on loan with an untreated injury. Around the time he was finally loaned to Carpi in January 2016, he sought a second medical opinion and was immediately diagnosed with an abdominal hernia.

==== Loan to Carpi ====
On 28 January 2016, de Guzmán joined Carpi on loan until 30 June 2016. Upon arrival, he immediately underwent surgery for his newly diagnosed hernia, and shortly afterwards, on 13 March 2016, scored the winning goal from a 90th-minute penalty in a 2–1 win over Frosinone.

==== Loan to Chievo ====
On 26 August 2016, de Guzmán joined Chievo on loan with an option to buy. During his time at Chievo, in a non-traditional move, he wore the number 1 shirt as an outfield player.

=== Eintracht Frankfurt ===
On 10 July 2017, de Guzmán joined Eintracht Frankfurt on a three-year contract until 30 June 2020. On 19 May 2018, he won the DFB-Pokal with Eintracht Frankfurt after they defeated Bayern Munich 3–1 in the final.

=== OFI ===
On 19 October 2020, de Guzmán signed a one-year deal with Super League Greece club OFI.

=== Sparta Rotterdam ===
On 22 July 2022, de Guzmán signed a contract with Sparta Rotterdam for one year with an option to extend.

He retired from playing in May 2026.

== International career ==
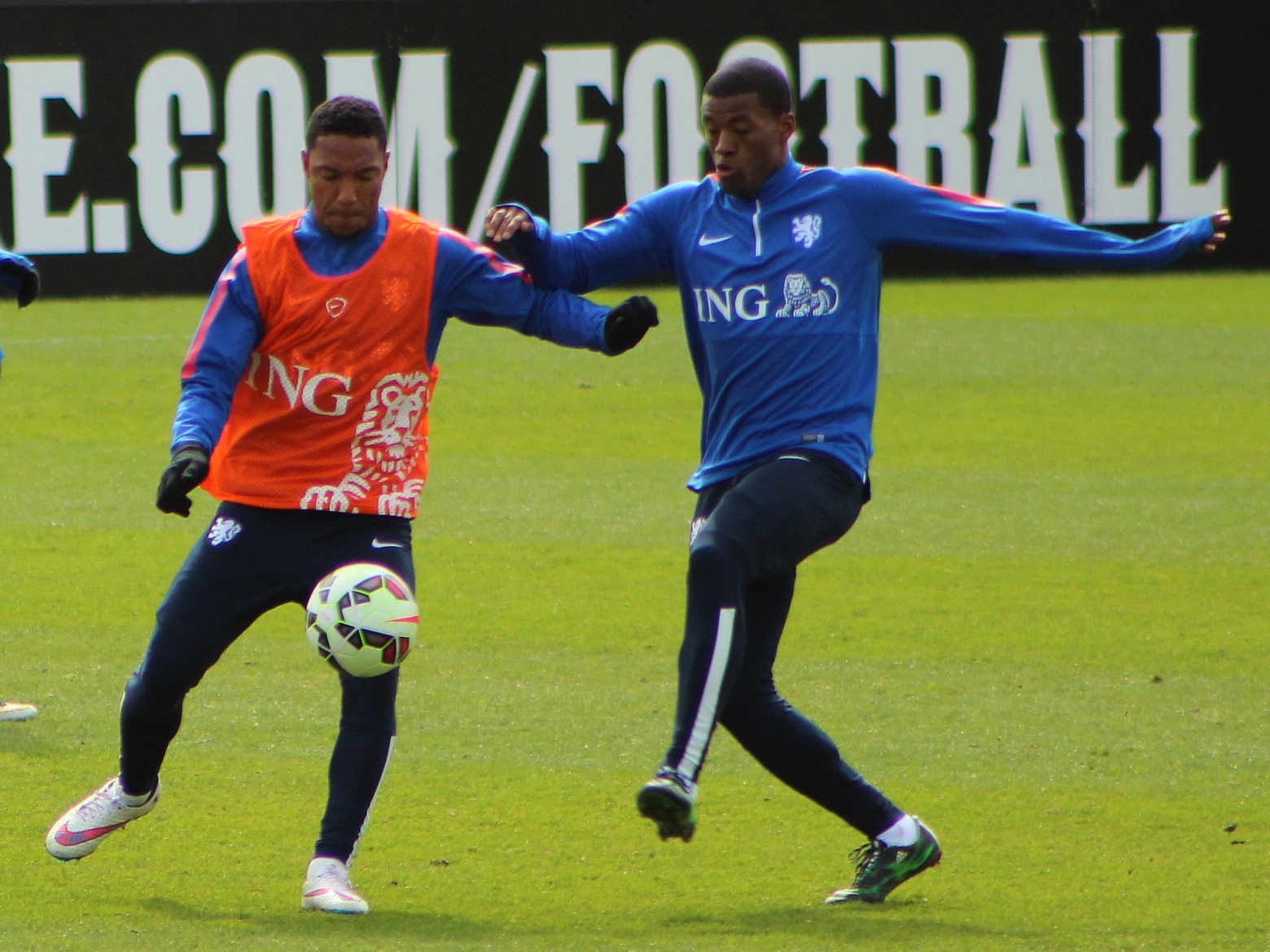
De Guzmán (left) battles Georginio Wijnaldum for the ball during training with Oranje in March 2015.

After much speculation on which country de Guzmán would choose to represent internationally, de Guzmán made himself available for selection by the Dutch national team, immediately after receiving his Dutch citizenship in February 2008, having applied for it the previous year. His decision was met with disappointment in Canada. Controversially, de Guzmán appeared on a nationally televised Canadian sports show a week before this announcement and claimed that he had not made up his mind on his international status, and was focusing on his club career in the Netherlands. His brother Julian held the most caps for the Canadian national team (until being surpassed in November 2021 by Atiba Hutchinson). After failing to make the final cut in a senior call up, de Guzmán made his international debut for the Netherlands U21 squad on 26 March 2008, in a European Championship qualification match against Estonia U21. He played a significant role, scoring the first and third goal and providing the assist for the second in a 3–0 victory. He was later named in the Netherlands squad for the 2008 Summer Olympics.

In 2011, de Guzmán expressed an interest to play alongside brother Julian de Guzman for the Canadian team. However, in 2012, de Guzmán gave an interview to The Score TV stating that he was dedicated to the Dutch national team and hoped he would be called up after the completion of Euro 2012. On 23 January 2013, de Guzmán was called up to the Netherlands provisional squad to play in a friendly against Italy and made his debut in the 46th minute of the game. On 6 March, Louis van Gaal included de Guzmán in his squad for the upcoming World Cup qualifying matches against Estonia and Romania to be held at the Amsterdam Arena in late March. On 31 May 2014, de Guzmán was named to the Netherlands final roster for the 2014 FIFA World Cup. He started Netherlands' first Group B match against Spain on 13 June, going 62 minutes in a 5–1 win.

== Personal life ==
De Guzmán has a son named Jaden born on 18 January 2007. Jaden played alongside Robin van Persie's son Shaqueel at the Feyenoord Academy.

== Career statistics ==
=== Club ===
As of match played 17 May 2026

Appearances and goals by club, season and competition
Club	Season	League			Cup (Note: Includes KNVB Cup, Copa del Rey, FA Cup, Coppa Italia, DFB-Pokal, and Greek Football Cup)		Continental		Other		Total	
Club	Season	Division	Apps	Goals	Apps	Goals	Apps	Goals	Apps	Goals	Apps	Goals
Feyenoord	2005–06	Eredivisie	29	4	1	0	1 (Note: Appearance(s) in UEFA Cup)	0	2 (Note: Appearances in Eredivisie European play-offs)	0	33	5
Feyenoord	2006–07	Eredivisie	32	7	1	0	6	1	1	0	40	8
Feyenoord	2007–08	Eredivisie	33	9	6	2	—		—		39	11
Feyenoord	2008–09	Eredivisie	2	0	0	0	1	0	—		3	0
Feyenoord	2009–10	Eredivisie	13	3	2	0	—		—		15	3
Feyenoord	Total		109	23	10	2	8	1	3	0	130	26
Mallorca	2010–11	La Liga	33	5	3	1	—		—		36	6
Mallorca	2011–12	La Liga	1	1	0	0	—		—		1	1
Mallorca	Total		34	6	3	1	0	0	—|		37	7
Villarreal	2011–12	La Liga	19	0	1	0	6 (Note: Appearances in UEFA Champions League)	1	—		26	1
Swansea City (loan)	2012–13	Premier League	37	5	2	0	—		6 (Note: Appearances in Football League Cup)	3	45	8
Swansea City (loan)	2013–14	Premier League	34	4	2	1	11 (Note: Appearances in UEFA Europa League)	2	1	0	48	7
Swansea City (loan)	Total		71	9	4	1	11	2	7	4	93	16
Napoli	2014–15	Serie A	23	3	4	0	8	4	1 (Note: Appearance in Supercoppa Italiana)	0	36	7
Carpi (loan)	2015–16	Serie A	5	1	0	0	—		—		5	1
Chievo (loan)	2016–17	Serie A	27	2	2	0	—		—		29	2
Eintracht Frankfurt	2017–18	Bundesliga	16	0	3	0	—		—		19	0
Eintracht Frankfurt	2018–19	Bundesliga	28	3	1	0	9	0	1 (Note: Appearance in DFL-Supercup)	0	39	3
Eintracht Frankfurt	2019–20	Bundesliga	8	0	0	0	2	1	—		10	1
Eintracht Frankfurt	Total		52	3	4	0	11	1	1	0	68	4
OFI	2020–21	Super League Greece	17	5	0	0	—		—		17	5
OFI	2021–22	Super League Greece	23	0	2	0	—		—		25	0
OFI	Total		40	5	2	0	—		—		42	5
Sparta Rotterdam	2022–23	Eredivisie	21	2	0	0	—		0	0	21	2
Sparta Rotterdam	2023–24	Eredivisie	31	1	1	0	—		1	0	33	1
Sparta Rotterdam	2024–25	Eredivisie	2	0	0	0	—		0	0	2	0
Sparta Rotterdam	2025–26	Eredivisie	6	0	0	0	—		—		6	0
Sparta Rotterdam	Total		60	3	1	0	—		1	0	62	3
Career total			440	55	32	4	44	9	13	3	528	69

=== International ===
Appearances and goals by national team and year
National team	Year	Apps	Goals
Netherlands	2013	8	0
Netherlands	2014	5	0
Netherlands	2015	1	0
Total		14	0

== Honours ==
Feyenoord

- KNVB Cup: 2007–08

Swansea City

- Football League Cup: 2012–13

Napoli

- Supercoppa Italiana: 2014

Eintracht Frankfurt

- DFB-Pokal: 2017–18

Netherlands

- FIFA World Cup third place: 2014
