= Filip Kostić =

Serbian footballer (born 1992)

Filip Kostić Филип Костић
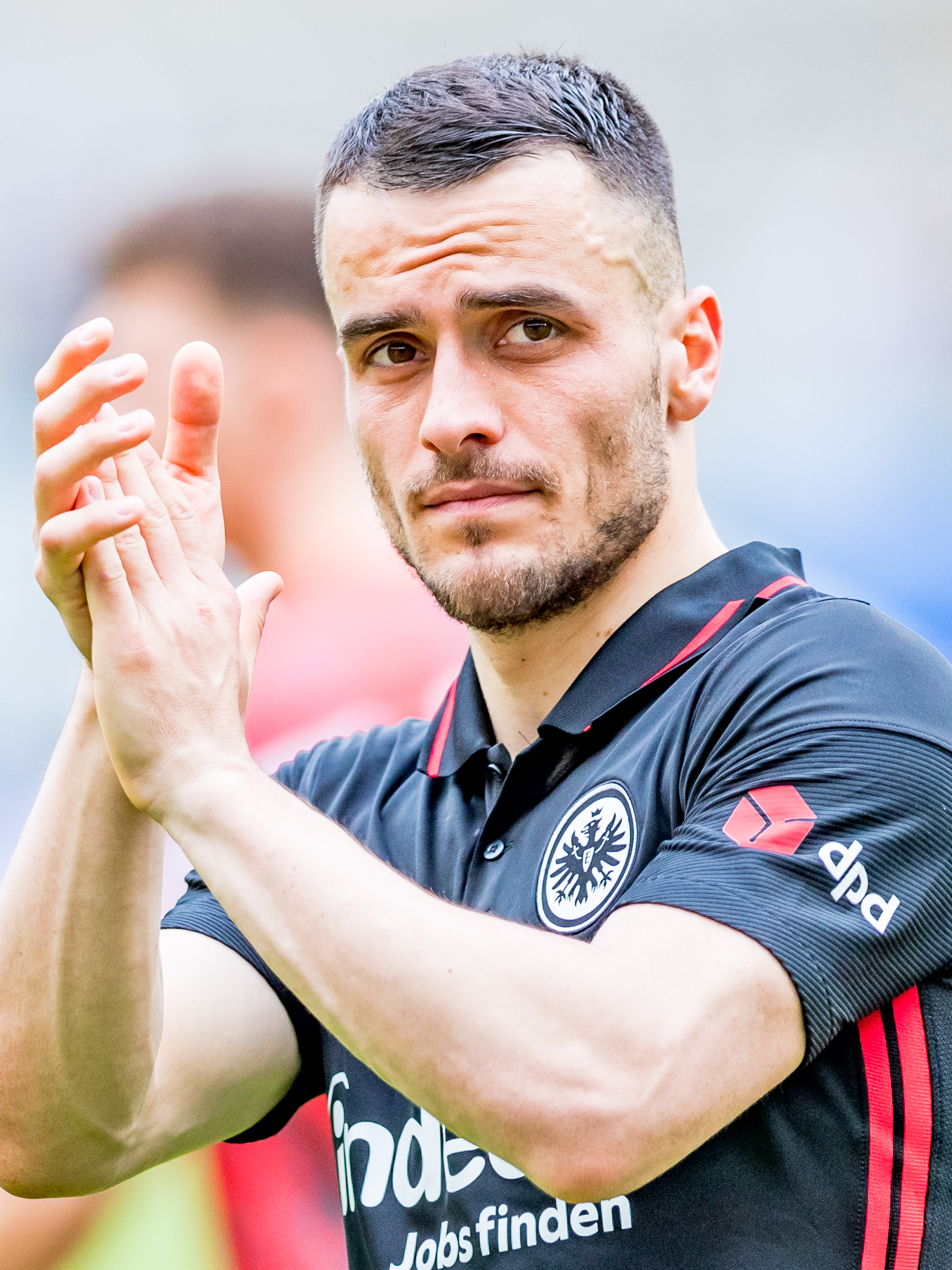
- Kostić with Eintracht Frankfurt in 2022

Personal information
- Full name: Filip Kostić
- Date of birth: 1 November 1992 (age 34)
- Place of birth: Kragujevac, Serbia, FR Yugoslavia
- Height: 1.82 m (6 ft 0 in)
- Positions: Left midfielder; wingback

Team information
- Current team: PSV
- Number: 18

Youth career
- Radnički Kragujevac

Senior career*
Years	Team	Apps	(Gls)
2010–2012	Radnički Kragujevac	62	(5)
2012–2014	Groningen	45	(11)
2014–2016	VfB Stuttgart	59	(8)
2016–2018	Hamburger SV	61	(9)
2018–2022	Eintracht Frankfurt	129	(18)
2022–2026	Juventus	84	(6)
2024–2025	→ Fenerbahçe (loan)	27	(1)
2026–	PSV	7	(1)

International career^{‡}
2015–	Serbia	76	(3)
- * Club domestic league appearances and goals as of 23:17, 8 November 2026 (UTC) ‡ National team caps and goals as of 4 October 2026

Filip Kostić (Serbian Cyrillic: Филип Костић, pronounced [fǐlip kôstitɕ]; born 1 November 1992) is a Serbian professional footballer who plays as a left midfielder or left-back for Eredivisie club PSV and the Serbia national team.

In the past, Kostić played for Radnički Kragujevac, FC Groningen, VfB Stuttgart, Hamburger SV, Eintracht Frankfurt, and Juventus. In 2024–25, he was on loan at Fenerbahçe. Kostić represented Serbia at the 2018 FIFA World Cup, 2022 FIFA World Cup, and UEFA Euro 2024.

== Club career ==
=== Radnički Kragujevac ===
Kostić made his senior debut with Radnički Kragujevac in 2010 at the age of 17. This was after the club was promoted to the Serbian SuperLiga from the Serbian First League. He began attracting the interest of several clubs, including Red Star Belgrade, Anderlecht, Udinese, and Tottenham Hotspur. On 15 April 2012, he was named starting left winger in Sportal's ideal team of round 24 in the SuperLiga.

=== Groningen ===
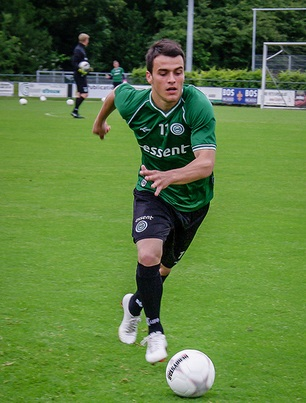
Kostić training with FC Groningen in 2013

On 4 April 2012, he signed a contract with Eredivisie side Groningen and moved to the Netherlands in June 2012 after the end of the season. He made his debut for Groningen on 21 October 2012. After getting little playing time, Kostić finally began showing promising potential from the beginning of the 2013–14 Eredivisie; he attracted media attention after playing a brilliant game in which he had one assist against NEC, and then on 25 August he added to his reputation of play-making by assisting twice against Go Ahead Eagles. Finally, on 20 October 2013, Kostić scored his first ever goal for Groningen in a 1–0 win against PSV Eindhoven. Kostić received criticism for a media interview after drawing 0–0 with Aberdeen F.C. in the second round of the Europa League qualifiers. He went on record after the match saying, “We go home happy, we have done 80% of what we need to go through”. Groningen went on to lose the tie with the Scottish club 1–2 at the Euroborg. Aberdeen winger Jonny Hayes was later quoted as saying "I was quite happy ramming their words down their throats".

=== VfB Stuttgart ===
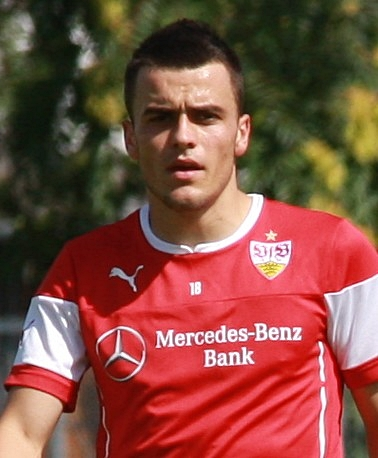
Kostić with VfB Stuttgart in 2014

On 9 August 2014, Kostić moved to German side VfB Stuttgart for €6 million and a possible bonus of €1 million. Groningen also would get 15% of a future transfer fee received by Stuttgart. Kostić signed a contract until June 2019 with VfB Stuttgart.

=== Hamburger SV ===
After the relegation of VfB Stuttgart at the end of the season 2015–16, Kostić was transferred to Hamburger SV for a fee of €14 million, making him the most expensive player in the history of the club.

=== Eintracht Frankfurt ===
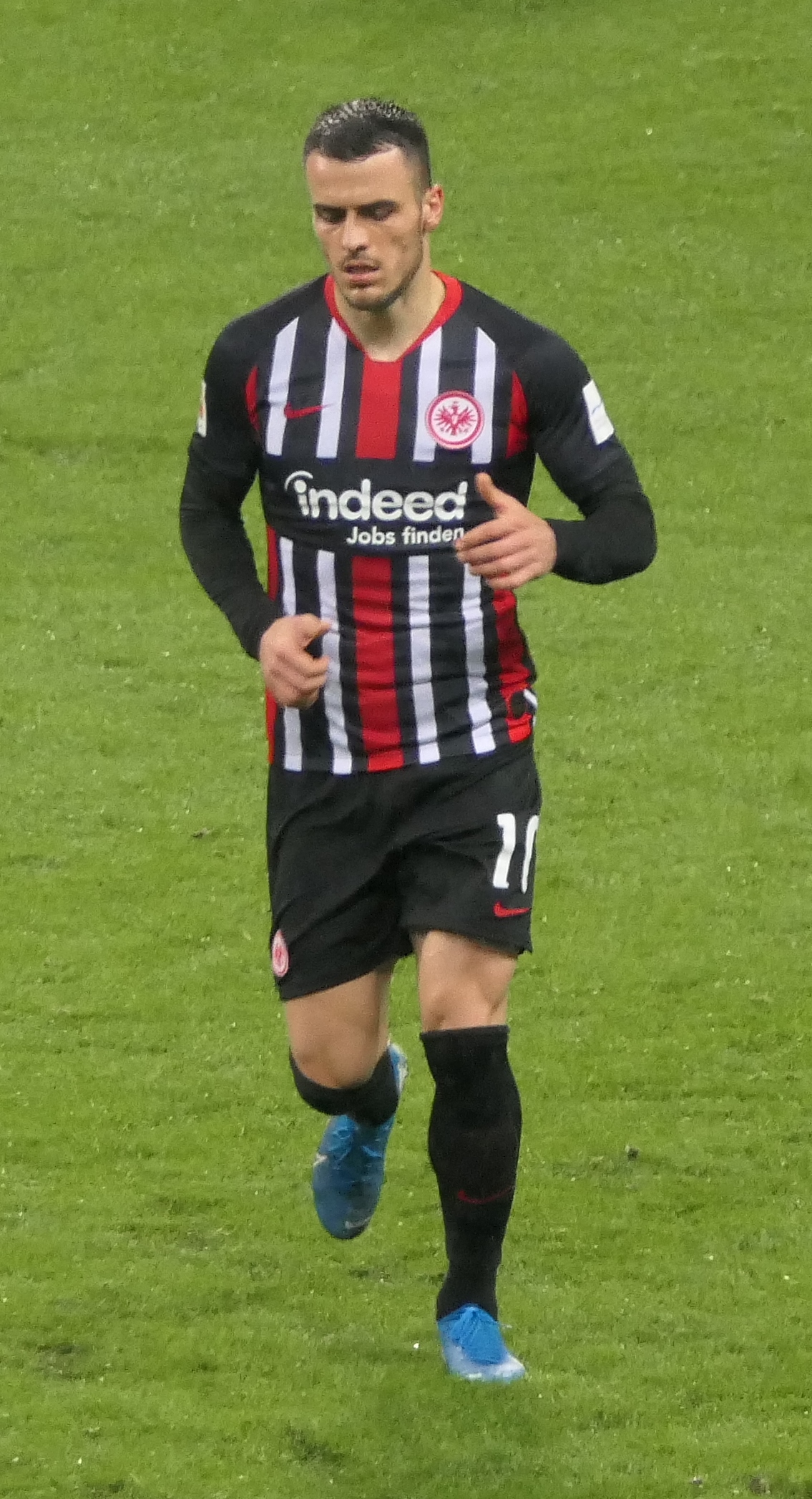
Kostić with Eintracht Frankfurt in 2019

On 20 August 2018, after the relegation of Hamburg at the end of the season 2017–18, Kostić joined Eintracht Frankfurt on loan until the end of 2018–19 season.

On 17 May 2019, Frankfurt announced the permanent signing of Kostić on a permanent deal until 2023.

On 14 April 2022, Kostić scored two goals as Frankfurt defeated Barcelona 3–2 at the Camp Nou and 4–3 on aggregate in the UEFA Europa League to qualify for the semi-finals. Eintracht later won the Europa League, and Kostic was pronounced player of the season and was also top assists provider.

=== Juventus ===
On 12 August 2022, Juventus announced the signing of Kostić on a four-year deal. On 19 March 2023, he scored the only goal in a 1–0 victory against Inter in the Derby d'Italia.

==== Fenerbahçe (loan) ====
On 9 September 2024, Kostic joined Turkish club Fenerbahçe on an initial season-long loan.

=== PSV ===
On 6 August 2026, Eredivisie club PSV announced the signing of Kostić on a two-year contract until June 2028. He joined on a free transfer following the expiry of his Juventus contract, taking the number 18 shirt and replacing Anass Salah-Eddine at left-back. The move marked his return to the Eredivisie twelve years after leaving Groningen.

== International career ==
=== Youth and early senior career ===
Kostić has played for Serbia at under-19 level and under-21 level. In the 2015 UEFA European Under-21 Championship qualification play-offs, he scored the winner against Spain.

On 7 June 2015, Kostić debuted for the Serbian senior squad against Azerbaijan in a 4–1 friendly victory in Sankt Pölten, Austria, making way for Lazar Marković after 56 minutes. He played his first competitive match for on 13 June 2015 in the UEFA Euro 2016 qualifying Group I against Denmark. On 5 September 2016, Kostić scored his first international goal against the Republic of Ireland in a 2–2 draw.

=== 2018 and 2022 FIFA World Cups ===
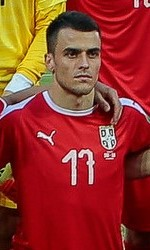
Kostić with Serbia in 2018

In June 2018, he was selected in Serbia's squad for the 2018 FIFA World Cup, playing all three group stage matches.

In November 2022, he was selected in Serbia's squad for the 2022 FIFA World Cup in Qatar. He played in group stage matches against Cameroon and Switzerland. Serbia finished fourth in the group.

=== UEFA Euro 2024 ===
Kostić was part of the Serbia squad for UEFA Euro 2024 and started the team's opening match of the tournament against England. He was substituted in the 43rd minute with a suspected knee ligament injury. He missed other Serbia matches in the tournament due to that injury.

== Career statistics ==
=== Club ===
As of match played 21 November 2026

Appearances and goals by club, season and competition
Club	Season	League			National cup (Note: Includes Serbian Cup, KNVB Cup, DFB-Pokal, Coppa Italia, Turkish Cup)		Europe		Other		Total	
Club	Season	Division	Apps	Goals	Apps	Goals	Apps	Goals	Apps	Goals	Apps	Goals
Radnički Kragujevac	2009–10	Serbian League West	5	0	—		—		—		5	0
Radnički Kragujevac	2010–11	Serbian First League	30	2	—		—		—		30	2
Radnički Kragujevac	2011–12	Serbian SuperLiga	27	3	2	0	—		—		29	3
Radnički Kragujevac	Total		62	5	2	0	—		—		64	5
Groningen	2012–13	Eredivisie	7	0	0	0	—		—		7	0
Groningen	2013–14	Eredivisie	38	11	3	1	—		—		41	12
Groningen	2014–15	Eredivisie	0	0	0	0	2 (Note: Appearances in UEFA Europa League)	0	—		2	0
Groningen	Total		45	11	3	1	2	0	—		50	12
VfB Stuttgart	2014–15	Bundesliga	29	3	1	0	—		—		30	3
VfB Stuttgart	2015–16	Bundesliga	30	5	3	0	—		—		33	5
VfB Stuttgart	Total		59	8	4	0	—		—		63	8
Hamburger SV	2016–17	Bundesliga	31	4	4	0	—		—		35	4
Hamburger SV	2017–18	Bundesliga	30	5	0	0	—		—		30	5
Hamburger SV	Total		61	9	4	0	—		—		65	9
Eintracht Frankfurt	2018–19	Bundesliga	34	6	0	0	12	4	—		46	10
Eintracht Frankfurt	2019–20	Bundesliga	33	4	3	3	15	5	—		51	12
Eintracht Frankfurt	2020–21	Bundesliga	30	4	0	0	—		—		30	4
Eintracht Frankfurt	2021–22	Bundesliga	31	4	0	0	12	3	—		43	7
Eintracht Frankfurt	2022–23	Bundesliga	1	0	1	0	—		0	0	2	0
Eintracht Frankfurt	Total		129	18	4	3	39	12	0	0	172	33
Juventus	2022–23	Serie A	37	3	3	0	14 (Note: Six appearances in UEFA Champions League, eight appearances in UEFA Europa League)	0	—		54	3
Juventus	2023–24	Serie A	29	0	4	0	—		—		33	0
Juventus	2024–25	Serie A	—		—		—		2 (Note: Appearances in FIFA Club World Cup)	0	2	0
Juventus	2025–26	Serie A	18	3	0	0	5 (Note: Appearances in UEFA Champions League)	0	—		23	3
Juventus	Total		84	6	7	0	19	0	2	0	112	6
Fenerbahçe (loan)	2024–25	Süper Lig	27	1	4	1	4	0	—		35	2
PSV	2026–27	Eredivisie	7	1	0	0	3	0	0	0	10	1
Career total			474	59	28	5	67	12	2	0	571	76

=== International ===
As of match played 4 October 2026

Appearances and goals by national team and year
National team	Year	Apps	Goals
Serbia	2015	5	0
Serbia	2016	8	2
Serbia	2017	6	0
Serbia	2018	9	0
Serbia	2019	4	0
Serbia	2020	3	0
Serbia	2021	8	1
Serbia	2022	9	0
Serbia	2023	8	0
Serbia	2024	4	0
Serbia	2025	6	0
Serbia	2026	6	0
Total		76	3

As of 16 June 2024

Scores and results list Serbia's goal tally first, score column indicates score after each Kostić goal.

List of international goals scored by Filip Kostić
No.	Date	Venue	Cap	Opponent	Score	Result	Competition
1	5 September 2016	Rajko Mitić Stadium, Belgrade, Serbia	10	Republic of Ireland	1–1	2–2	2018 FIFA World Cup qualification
2	6 October 2016	Zimbru Stadium, Chișinău, Moldova	11	Moldova	1–0	3–0	2018 FIFA World Cup qualification
3	27 March 2021	Rajko Mitić Stadium, Belgrade, Serbia	37	Portugal	2–2	2–2	2022 FIFA World Cup qualification

== Honours ==
Eintracht Frankfurt

- UEFA Europa League: 2021–22

Juventus

- Coppa Italia: 2023–24

Individual

- UEFA Europa League Squad of the Season: 2018–19, 2021–22
- Bundesliga Team of the Season: 2019–20
- UEFA Europa League Player of the Season: 2021–22
- UEFA Europa League most assists: 2021–22
