= Şahverdi Çetin =

German footballer (born 2000)

Personal information
- Full name: Şahverdi Çetin
- Date of birth: 28 September 2000 (age 26)
- Place of birth: Mainz, Germany
- Height: 1.74 m (5 ft 9 in)
- Position: Midfielder

Team information
- Current team: Mardin 1969

Youth career
- 2013–2020: Eintracht Frankfurt

Senior career*
Years	Team	Apps	(Gls)
2020–2023	Ankaragücü	37	(1)
2023	Dordrecht	15	(2)
2023–2024	Keçiörengücü	24	(1)
2024–2026	Serikspor	43	(3)
2026–	Mardin 1969	0	(0)

International career^{‡}
2015	Germany U15	2	(0)
2015–2016	Germany U16	10	(1)
2016–2017	Germany U17	15	(1)
2017	Germany U18	2	(0)
- * Club domestic league appearances and goals as of 10:28, 17 January 2026 (UTC) ‡ National team caps and goals as of 19 October 2020

Şahverdi Çetin (born 28 September 2000) is a German professional footballer who plays as a midfielder for Turkish club Mardin 1969.

== Club career ==
Çetin joined the youth academy of Eintracht Frankfurt in 2013, and signed his first professional contract with them in 2017 before moving to Ankaragücü in 2020. Çetin made his professional debut with Ankaragücü in a 5–3 Süper Lig loss to Çaykur Rizespor on 17 October 2020.

On 13 January 2023, Çetin signed a 1.5-year contract with Dordrecht in the Netherlands.

In January 2026, Çetin joined TFF Second League club Mardin 1969, after spending one-and-a-half years with Serikspor.

== International career ==
Born in Germany, Çetin is of Turkish descent. He is a youth international for Germany.
