= Noel Knothe =

German footballer

Personal information
- Date of birth: 5 May 1999 (age 27)
- Place of birth: Bad Soden, Germany
- Height: 1.88 m (6 ft 2 in)
- Position: Centre-back

Team information
- Current team: Kickers Offenbach
- Number: 13

Youth career
- –2014: FSV Frankfurt
- 2014–2018: Eintracht Frankfurt

Senior career*
Years	Team	Apps	(Gls)
2017–2019	Eintracht Frankfurt	0	(0)
2019	→ FC Pipinsried (loan)	12	(0)
2019–2022	1. FC Nürnberg II	43	(1)
2020–2022	1. FC Nürnberg	5	(0)
2022–2023	FSV Frankfurt	31	(0)
2023–	Kickers Offenbach	80	(5)
- * Club domestic league appearances and goals as of 26 June 2026

Noel Knothe (born 5 May 1999) is a German professional footballer who plays as a centre-back for Kickers Offenbach in Regionalliga Südwest.

== Career ==
Knothe made his professional debut for 1. FC Nürnberg in the 2. Bundesliga on 6 December 2020, coming on as a substitute in the 78th minute for Nikola Dovedan against SC Paderborn. The away match finished as a 2–0 win for Nürnberg.

On 1 July 2022, Knothe signed with FSV Frankfurt.
