= Marijan Ćavar =

Bosnian footballer

Personal information
- Full name: Marijan Ćavar
- Date of birth: 2 February 1998 (age 28)
- Place of birth: Prozor-Rama, Bosnia and Herzegovina
- Height: 1.84 m (6 ft 0 in)
- Position: Midfielder

Team information
- Current team: Zrinjski Mostar
- Number: 42

Youth career
- 2008–2013: HNK Rama
- 2013–2014: Branitelj
- 2014–2017: Zrinjski Mostar

Senior career*
Years	Team	Apps	(Gls)
2017–2018	Zrinjski Mostar	16	(0)
2018–2021	Eintracht Frankfurt	1	(0)
2018–2019	→ Osijek (loan)	13	(0)
2021	Greuther Fürth	1	(0)
2021–2024	Široki Brijeg	88	(14)
2024–	Zrinjski Mostar	27	(3)

International career
2016–2017	Bosnia and Herzegovina U19	12	(1)
2017–2020	Bosnia and Herzegovina U21	18	(3)
2018–2021	Bosnia and Herzegovina	3	(0)
- * Club domestic league appearances and goals as of 19 September 2026

Marijan Ćavar (Croatian pronunciation: [mǎrijaːn tɕǎʋaːr]; born 2 February 1998) is a Bosnian professional footballer who plays as a midfielder for Bosnian Premier League club Zrinjski Mostar.

Ćavar started his professional career at Zrinjski, before joining Eintracht Frankfurt in 2018, who loaned him to Osijek later that year.

A former youth international for Bosnia and Herzegovina, Ćavar made his senior international debut in 2018.

== Club career ==
=== Early career ===
Ćavar started his career at local clubs, before joining Zrinjski Mostar's youth academy in 2014. He made his professional debut against Sloboda Tuzla on 28 May 2017 at the age of 19.

=== Eintracht Frankfurt ===
On 19 January 2018, Ćavar was transferred to German side Eintracht Frankfurt for an undisclosed fee. He waited on his official debut for the club over three months, until 28 April. Ćavar won his first trophy with the club on 19 May, by beating Bayern Munich in DFB-Pokal final.

In August 2018, Ćavar was sent on a season-long loan to Croatian club Osijek.

Ćavar joined SpVgg Greuther Fürth on a free transfer from Eintracht Frankfurt in January 2021 following a trial at the club. He signed a contract until the end of the season with the option of two further years.

== International career ==
Ćavar represented Bosnia and Herzegovina on various youth levels. He also served as captain of the under-21 team under coach Vinko Marinović.

In January 2018, he received his first senior call-up, for friendly games against United States and Mexico. Ćavar debuted in a goalless draw against former on 28 January.

== Career statistics ==
=== Club ===
As of match played 19 September 2026

Appearances and goals by club, season and competition
Club	Season	League			National cup (Note: Includes Bosnian Cup, Croatian Cup)		Continental		Total	
Club	Season	Division	Apps	Goals	Apps	Goals	Apps	Goals	Apps	Goals
Zrinjski Mostar	2016–17	Bosnian Premier League	1	0	0	0	–		1	0
Zrinjski Mostar	2017–18	Bosnian Premier League	15	0	1	0	2 (Note: Appearances in UEFA Champions League)	0	18	0
Zrinjski Mostar	Total		16	0	1	0	2	0	19	0
Eintracht Frankfurt	2017–18	Bundesliga	1	0	–		–		1	0
Osijek (loan)	2018–19	1. HNL	13	0	2	0	–		15	0
Greuther Fürth	2020–21	2. Bundesliga	1	0	–		–		1	0
Široki Brijeg	2021–22	Bosnian Premier League	23	1	4	0	–		27	1
Široki Brijeg	2022–23	Bosnian Premier League	31	5	2	0	–		33	5
Široki Brijeg	2023–24	Bosnian Premier League	29	6	5	0	–		34	6
Široki Brijeg	2024–25	Bosnian Premier League	5	2	–		–		5	2
Široki Brijeg	Total		88	14	11	0	–		99	14
Zrinjski Mostar	2024–25	Bosnian Premier League	13	2	2	0	–		15	2
Zrinjski Mostar	2025–26	Bosnian Premier League	13	1	5	1	7 (Note: Two appearances UEFA Champions League; five appearances in UEFA Conference League)	0	25	2
Zrinjski Mostar	2026–27	Bosnian Premier League	1	0	0	0	1 (Note: Appearance in UEFA Conference League)	0	2	0
Zrinjski Mostar	Total		27	3	7	1	8	0	42	4
Career total			146	17	21	1	10	0	177	18

=== International ===
Appearances and goals by national team and year
National team	Year	Apps	Goals
Bosnia and Herzegovina
Bosnia and Herzegovina	2018	2	0
Bosnia and Herzegovina	2021	1	0
Total		3	0

== Honours ==
Zrinjski Mostar

- Bosnian Premier League: 2016–17, 2024–25
- Bosnian Supercup: 2024

Eintracht Frankfurt

- DFB-Pokal: 2017–18
