= Abdulkerim Çakar =

German footballer (born 2001)

Personal information
- Date of birth: 14 April 2001 (age 25)
- Place of birth: Germersheim, Germany
- Height: 1.76 m (5 ft 9 in)
- Position: Forward

Youth career
- FV Germersheim
- 2013–2018: 1. FC Kaiserslautern
- 2018–2020: Eintracht Frankfurt

Senior career*
Years	Team	Apps	(Gls)
2020–2022	1899 Hoffenheim II	6	(1)
2021–2022	→ Académico Viseu (loan)	4	(0)
2022–2023	Gaziantep	0	(0)
2024	TuS Mechtersheim	8	(4)

International career^{‡}
2016–2017	Germany U16	9	(3)
2017	Germany U17	3	(1)
2018	Germany U18	2	(1)
- * Club domestic league appearances and goals as of 22:49, 2 July 2024 (UTC) ‡ National team caps and goals as of 11:00, 6 May 2022 (UTC)

Abdulkerim Çakar (born 14 April 2001) is a German professional footballer who most recently played as a forward for TuS Mechtersheim.

== Club career ==
Born in Germersheim, Çakar played for local side FV Germersheim, before joining professional clubs 1. FC Kaiserslautern and Eintracht Frankfurt.

In August 2021, Çakar moved on loan to Portuguese side Académico Viseu. He made a slow start to his career in Viseu, only playing two of a possible twelve after his arrival.

On 11 August 2022, Çakar signed a three-year contract with Gaziantep in Turkey. His contract with Gaziantep was mutually terminated on 26 September 2023.

== International career ==
Born in Germany, Çakar is of Turkish descent. He has represented Germany at youth international level.

== Career statistics ==
=== Club ===
As of 6 May 2022

Appearances and goals by club, season and competition
Club	Season	League			Cup		Other		Total	
Club	Season	Division	Apps	Goals	Apps	Goals	Apps	Goals	Apps	Goals
1899 Hoffenheim II	2020–21	Regionalliga	6	1	–		0	0	6	1
1899 Hoffenheim II	2021–22	Regionalliga	0	0	–		0	0	0	0
1899 Hoffenheim II	Total		6	1	0	0	0	0	6	1
Académico Viseu (loan)	2021–22	Liga Portugal 2	3	0	1 (Note: Appearances in the Taça de Portugal)	0	0	0	4	0
Career total			9	1	1	0	0	0	10	1
