= 2022 UEFA Europa League final =

Football match

- Match programme cover
- Event: 2021–22 UEFA Europa League
Eintracht Frankfurt	Rangers
(Germany)	(Scotland)
1	1
- After extra time Eintracht Frankfurt won 5–4 on penalties
- Date: 18 May 2022
- Venue: Estadio Ramón Sánchez Pizjuán, Seville
- Man of the Match: Kevin Trapp (Eintracht Frankfurt)
- Referee: Slavko Vinčić (Slovenia)
- Attendance: 38,842
- Weather: Partly cloudy night 31 °C (88 °F); 32% humidity

The 2022 UEFA Europa League final was the final match of the 2021–22 UEFA Europa League, the 51st season of Europe's secondary club football tournament organised by UEFA, and the 13th season since it was renamed from the UEFA Cup to the UEFA Europa League. It was played at Estadio Ramón Sánchez Pizjuán in Seville, Spain, on 18 May 2022, between German club Eintracht Frankfurt and Scottish club Rangers.

The final was originally scheduled to be played at the Puskás Aréna in Budapest, Hungary. However, due to the postponement and relocation of the 2020 final, the final hosts were shifted back a year, with Budapest instead hosting the 2023 final.

Eintracht Frankfurt won the match 5–4 on penalties, following a 1–1 draw after extra time, for their second UEFA Cup/Europa League title after 1980. That 42 years of await broke the record of the longest gap between two UEFA Cup/Europa League titles, which was held by Feyenoord before, with 28 years (1974-2002). Frankfurt became the first German side since Schalke 04 in 1997 to win the competition. As winners, they earned the right to play against the winners of the 2021–22 UEFA Champions League, Real Madrid, in the 2022 UEFA Super Cup, and qualified for the 2022–23 UEFA Champions League group stage.

== Venue ==
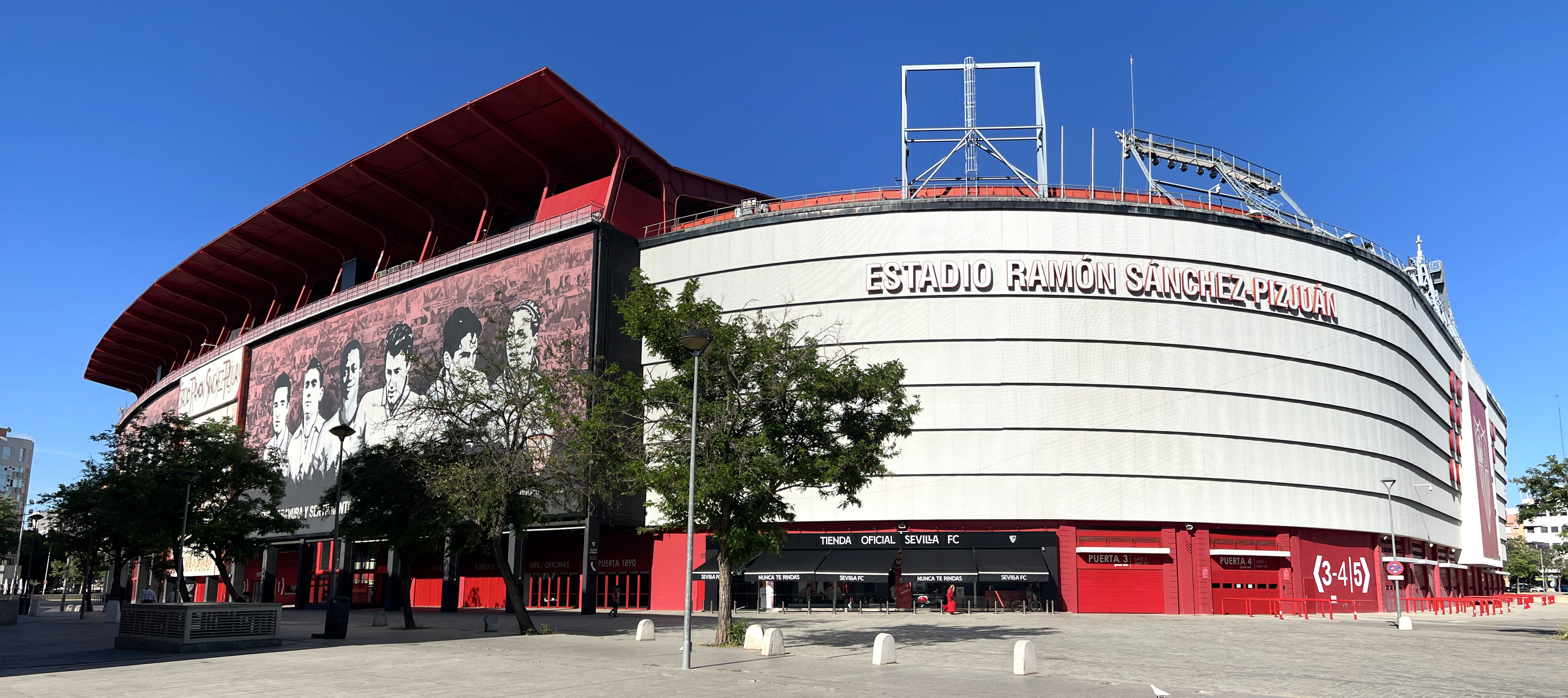
The Estadio Ramón Sánchez Pizjuán in Seville hosted the final.

This was the first Europa League final to be held at the stadium. It previously hosted the 1986 European Cup final. The city of Seville hosted the 2003 UEFA Cup final at the Estadio de La Cartuja. Spain had hosted four other UEFA Cup finals (holding a leg in 1977, 1985, 1986, and 1988).

=== Host selection ===
An open bidding process was launched on 28 September 2018 by UEFA to select the venues of the finals of the UEFA Champions League, UEFA Europa League, and UEFA Women's Champions League in 2021. Associations had until 26 October 2018 to express interest, and bid dossiers must be submitted by 15 February 2019.

UEFA announced on 1 November 2018 that three associations had expressed interest in hosting the 2021 UEFA Europa League final, and on 22 February 2019 that two associations submitted their dossiers by the deadline.

Bidding associations for final
Association	Stadium	City	Capacity
Georgia	Boris Paichadze Dinamo Arena	Tbilisi	54,202
Spain	Estadio Ramón Sánchez Pizjuán	Seville	43,883

The following associations expressed interest in hosting but eventually did not submit bids:

- Austria: Ernst-Happel-Stadion, Vienna
- Czech Republic: Sinobo Stadium, Prague
- Hungary: Puskás Aréna, Budapest

The Ramón Sánchez Pizjuán was selected by the UEFA Executive Committee during their meeting in Ljubljana, Slovenia on 24 September 2019.

On 17 June 2020, the UEFA Executive Committee announced that due to the postponement and relocation of the 2020 final, Seville would instead host the 2022 final.

== Background ==
This was Eintracht Frankfurt's third final in a major UEFA competition, having lost the 1960 European Cup final to Real Madrid and won the 1980 UEFA Cup final. Having become the first German team in a major European final since Bayern Munich in the 2020 UEFA Champions League final and the first UEFA Cup/Europa League finalist from Germany since Werder Bremen in 2009, they were seeking to become the first German side since Schalke 04 in 1997 to win the competition. Their manager Oliver Glasner was seeking to become the first Austrian to win a European trophy since Ernst Happel in the 1983 European Cup final and the first Austrian to win the UEFA Cup/Europa League.

This was Rangers' fifth final in a major UEFA competition, having won the 1972 European Cup Winners' Cup final and lost both the 1961 and 1967 Cup Winners' Cup finals as well as the 2008 UEFA Cup final. Having become the first Scottish club in any European final since themselves in 2008, they were seeking to become the first Scottish club since Aberdeen in the 1983 European Super Cup to win a European trophy and the first Scottish side to win the UEFA Cup/Europa League. Their manager Giovanni van Bronckhorst was seeking to become the first Dutch to win a European trophy since Dick Advocaat with Zenit Saint Petersburg in the 2008 UEFA Super Cup; they were qualified after defeating Rangers in the year's UEFA Cup final.

The two sides previously met twice in European competitions, in the 1959–60 European Cup semi-finals, with Eintracht Frankfurt winning both legs.

=== Previous finals ===
In the following table, finals until 2009 were in the UEFA Cup era, since 2010 were in the UEFA Europa League era.

Team	Previous final appearances (bold indicates winners)
(Germany) Eintracht Frankfurt	1 (**1980**)
(Scotland) Rangers	1 (2008)

== Route to the final ==
Note: In all results below, the score of the finalist is given first (H: home; A: away).

(Germany) Eintracht Frankfurt				Round	(Scotland) Rangers			
Europa League					Champions League			
Bye				Qualifying phase (EL, CL)	Opponent	Agg.	1st leg	2nd leg
Bye				Third qualifying round	(Sweden) Malmö FF	2–4	1–2 (A)	1–2 (H)
Bye					Europa League			
Bye				Play-off round	(Armenia) Alashkert	1–0	1–0 (H)	0–0 (A)
Opponent	Result			Group stage	Opponent	Result		
(Turkey) Fenerbahçe	1–1 (H)			Matchday 1	(France) Lyon	0–2 (H)		
(Belgium) Antwerp	1–0 (A)			Matchday 2	(Czech Republic) Sparta Prague	0–1 (A)		
(Greece) Olympiacos	3–1 (H)			Matchday 3	(Denmark) Brøndby	2–0 (H)		
(Greece) Olympiacos	2–1 (A)			Matchday 4	(Denmark) Brøndby	1–1 (A)		
(Belgium) Antwerp	2–2 (H)			Matchday 5	(Czech Republic) Sparta Prague	2–0 (H)		
(Turkey) Fenerbahçe	1–1 (A)			Matchday 6	(France) Lyon	1–1 (A)		
Group D winners: Pos / Team / Pld / Pts; 1 / (Germany) Eintracht Frankfurt / 6 / 12; 2 / (Greece) Olympiacos / 6 / 9; 3 / (Turkey) Fenerbahçe / 6 / 6; 4 / (Belgium) Antwerp / 6 / 5; Source: UEFA				Final standings	Group A runners-up: Pos / Team / Pld / Pts; 1 / (France) Lyon / 6 / 16; 2 / (Scotland) Rangers / 6 / 8; 3 / (Czech Republic) Sparta Prague / 6 / 7; 4 / (Denmark) Brøndby / 6 / 2; Source: UEFA			
Opponent	Agg.	1st leg	2nd leg	Knockout phase	Opponent	Agg.	1st leg	2nd leg
Bye				Knockout round play-offs	(Germany) Borussia Dortmund	6–4	4–2 (A)	2–2 (H)
(Spain) Real Betis	3–2	2–1 (A)	1–1 (a.e.t.) (H)	Round of 16	(Serbia) Red Star Belgrade	4–2	3–0 (H)	1–2 (A)
(Spain) Barcelona	4–3	1–1 (H)	3–2 (A)	Quarter-finals	(Portugal) Braga	3–2	0–1 (A)	3–1 (a.e.t.) (H)
(England) West Ham United	3–1	2–1 (A)	1–0 (H)	Semi-finals	(Germany) RB Leipzig	3–2	0–1 (A)	3–1 (H)

== Pre-match ==
=== Identity ===
The logo of the 2022 UEFA Europa League Final was unveiled at the group stage draw on 27 August 2021 in Istanbul, Turkey.

=== Ambassador ===
The ambassador for the final was former Sevilla goalkeeper Andrés Palop.

=== Officials ===
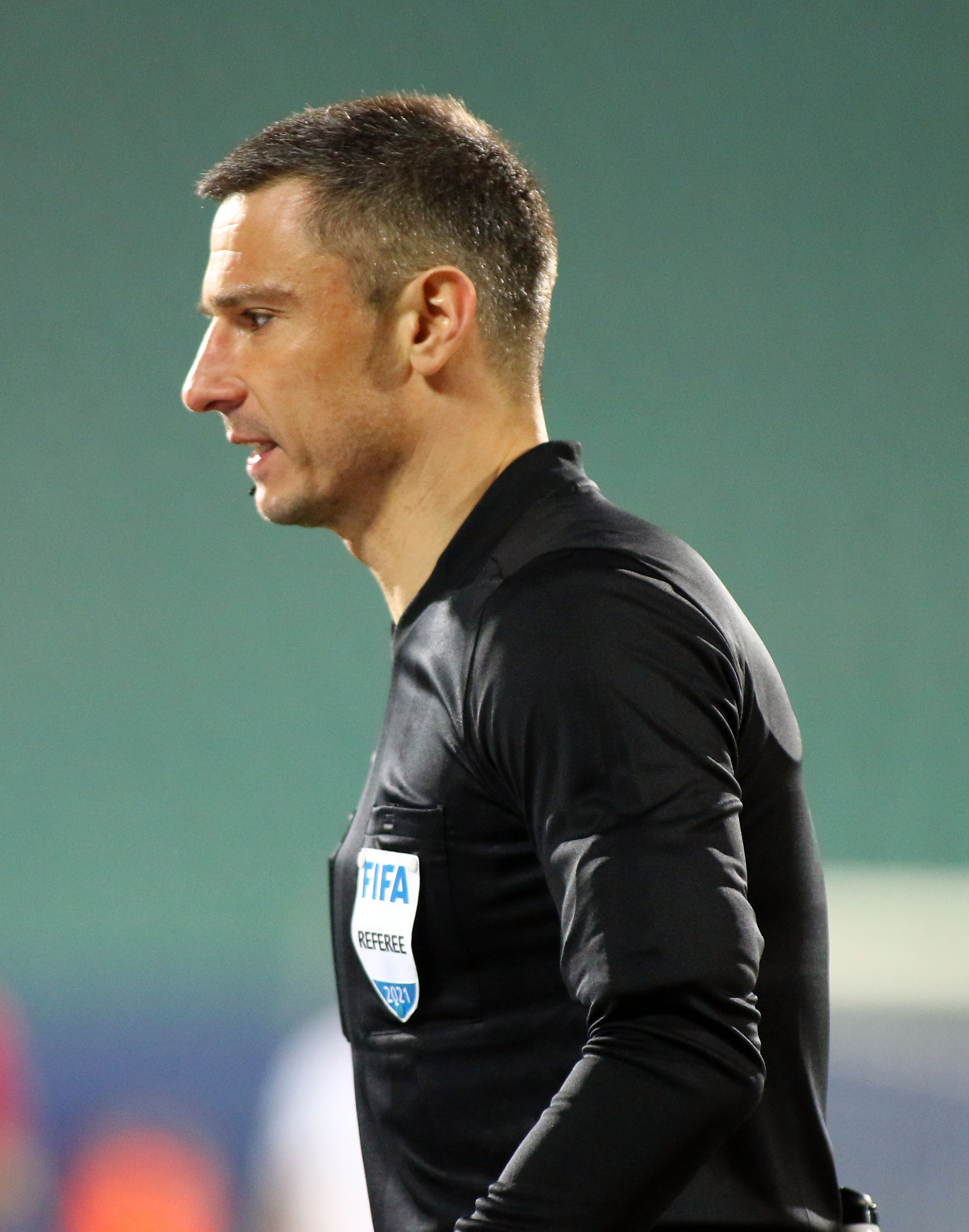
Slovenian referee Slavko Vinčić officiated the final.

On 11 May 2022, UEFA named Slovenian official Slavko Vinčić as the referee for the final. Vinčić had been a FIFA referee since 2010, and was previously an additional assistant referee in the 2017 UEFA Europa League Final and the fourth official in the 2021 UEFA Europa League Final. He also worked as an additional assistant referee in the 2012 UEFA Super Cup. He officiated ten matches in the 2021–22 Champions League season, with two matches in qualification, five in the group stage and three knockout fixtures. He served as a referee at UEFA Euro 2020, where he officiated two group matches and a quarter-final. He was joined by three of his fellow countrymen, with Tomaž Klančnik and Andraž Kovačič as assistant referees, and Jure Praprotnik as one of the assistant VAR officials. Srđan Jovanović of Serbia served as the fourth official, while Dutchman Pol van Boekel was appointed as the video assistant referee. Spaniards Alejandro Hernández Hernández and Roberto Díaz Pérez del Palomar served as the other assistant VAR officials.

== Match ==
=== Details ===
The "home" team (for administrative purposes) was determined by an additional draw held after the quarter-final and semi-final draws.

18 May 2022
21:00 UTC+2

Eintracht Frankfurt (Germany)	1–1 (a.e.t.)	(Scotland) Rangers
Borré 69'	Report	Aribo 57'
Penalties
Lenz (penalty scored); Hrustic (penalty scored); Kamada (penalty scored); Kostić (penalty scored); Borré (penalty scored)	5–4	(penalty scored) Tavernier; (penalty scored) Davis; (penalty scored) Arfield; (penalty missed) Ramsey; (penalty scored) Roofe

Estadio Ramón Sánchez Pizjuán, Seville
Attendance: 38,842
Referee: Slavko Vinčić (Slovenia)

Eintracht Frankfurt	Rangers

GK	1	(Germany) Kevin Trapp
CB	35	(Brazil) Tuta	(substituted off) 58'
CB	18	(Mali) Almamy Touré
CB	2	(France) Evan Ndicka	(substituted off) 100'
RM	36	(Germany) Ansgar Knauff
CM	8	(Switzerland) Djibril Sow	(substituted off) 106'
CM	17	(Germany) Sebastian Rode (c)	(substituted off) 90'
LM	10	(Serbia) Filip Kostić
AM	29	(Denmark) Jesper Lindstrøm	(substituted off) 70'
AM	15	(Japan) Daichi Kamada
CF	19	(Colombia) Rafael Santos Borré
Substitutes:
GK	31	(Germany) Jens Grahl
DF	22	(United States) Timothy Chandler
DF	24	(Germany) Danny da Costa
DF	25	(Germany) Christopher Lenz	(substituted on) 100'
MF	6	(Croatia) Kristijan Jakić	(substituted on) 90'
MF	7	(Australia) Ajdin Hrustic	(substituted on) 106'
MF	20	(Japan) Makoto Hasebe	(substituted on) 58'
MF	27	(Morocco) Aymen Barkok
FW	9	(Netherlands) Sam Lammers
FW	21	(Germany) Ragnar Ache
FW	23	(Norway) Jens Petter Hauge	(substituted on) 70'
FW	39	(Portugal) Gonçalo Paciência
Manager:
(Austria) Oliver Glasner

GK	1	(Scotland) Allan McGregor
RB	2	(England) James Tavernier (c)
CB	6	(England) Connor Goldson
CB	3	(Nigeria) Calvin Bassey
LB	31	(Croatia) Borna Barišić		(substituted off) 117'
CM	8	(Scotland) Ryan Jack		(substituted off) 74'
CM	4	(England) John Lundstram
RW	14	(England) Ryan Kent
AM	23	(Scotland) Scott Wright	(yellow card) 73'	(substituted off) 74'
LW	18	(Finland) Glen Kamara		(substituted off) 91'
CF	17	(Nigeria) Joe Aribo	(yellow card) 62'	(substituted off) 101'
Substitutes:
GK	28	(Scotland) Robby McCrorie
GK	33	(Scotland) Jon McLaughlin
DF	26	(Nigeria) Leon Balogun
DF	43	(Scotland) Leon King
MF	9	(Ivory Coast) Amad Diallo
MF	10	(Northern Ireland) Steven Davis		(substituted on) 74'
MF	16	(Wales) Aaron Ramsey			(substituted on) 117'
MF	19	(United States) James Sands		(substituted on) 101'
MF	37	(Canada) Scott Arfield		(substituted on) 91'
MF	51	(Scotland) Alex Lowry
FW	25	(Jamaica) Kemar Roofe		(substituted on) 117'
FW	30	(Zambia) Fashion Sakala		(substituted on) 74'	(substituted off) 117'
Manager:
(Netherlands) Giovanni van Bronckhorst

Man of the Match:
Kevin Trapp (Eintracht Frankfurt)

Assistant referees:
Tomaž Klančnik (Slovenia)
Andraž Kovačič (Slovenia)
Fourth official:
Srđan Jovanović (Serbia)
Video assistant referee:
Pol van Boekel (Netherlands)
Assistant video assistant referees:
Jure Praprotnik (Slovenia)
Alejandro Hernández Hernández (Spain)
Roberto Díaz Pérez del Palomar (Spain)

Match rules

- 90 minutes
- 30 minutes of extra time if necessary
- Penalty shoot-out if scores still level
- Twelve named substitutes
- Maximum of five substitutions, with a sixth allowed in extra time (Note: Each team was given only three opportunities to make substitutions, with a fourth opportunity in extra time, excluding substitutions made at half-time, before the start of extra time and at half-time in extra time.)

=== Statistics ===
First half
Statistic	Eintracht Frankfurt	Rangers
Goals scored	0	0
Total shots	11	3
Shots on target	3	1
Saves	1	3
Ball possession	41%	59%
Corner kicks	4	2
Fouls committed	7	3
Offsides	0	1
Yellow cards	0	0
Red cards	0	0

Second half
Statistic	Eintracht Frankfurt	Rangers
Goals scored	1	1
Total shots	6	3
Shots on target	1	1
Saves	0	1
Ball possession	53%	47%
Corner kicks	5	0
Fouls committed	4	7
Offsides	2	1
Yellow cards	0	2
Red cards	0	0

Extra time
Statistic	Eintracht Frankfurt	Rangers
Goals scored	0	0
Total shots	5	8
Shots on target	0	4
Saves	4	0
Ball possession	46%	54%
Corner kicks	2	0
Fouls committed	7	0
Offsides	0	0
Yellow cards	0	0
Red cards	0	0

Overall
Statistic	Eintracht Frankfurt	Rangers
Goals scored	1	1
Total shots	22	14
Shots on target	4	6
Saves	5	4
Ball possession	47%	53%
Corner kicks	11	2
Fouls committed	18	10
Offsides	2	2
Yellow cards	0	2
Red cards	0	0

== See also ==
- 2022 UEFA Champions League final
- 2022 UEFA Europa Conference League final
- 2022 UEFA Women's Champions League final
- 2022 UEFA Super Cup
- Eintracht Frankfurt in European football
- Rangers F.C. in European football
- 2021–22 Eintracht Frankfurt season
- 2021–22 Rangers F.C. season
