= 2021–22 Eintracht Frankfurt season =

Eintracht Frankfurt
2021–22 season
- President: Peter Fischer
- Chairmen: Markus Krösche; Axel Hellmann; Oliver Frankenbach
- Head coach: Oliver Glasner
- Bundesliga: 11th
- DFB-Pokal: First round
- UEFA Europa League: Winners
- Top goalscorer: League: Rafael Santos Borré (8); All: Rafael Santos Borré (12)
- Highest home attendance: 51,500 8 May 2022 v Mönchengladbach (league)
- Lowest home attendance: 250 8 January 2022 v Borussia Dortmund (league)
- Average home league attendance: 26,162
Home colours	Away colours	Third colours

The 2021–22 season was the 122nd season in the history of Eintracht Frankfurt, a football club based in Frankfurt, Germany. In addition to the domestic league, Eintracht Frankfurt also participated in this season's editions of the domestic cup, the DFB-Pokal, and the UEFA Europa League. This was the 97th season for Frankfurt in the Deutsche Bank Park, located in Frankfurt, Hesse, Germany. The season covers a period from 1 July 2021 to 30 June 2022.

== Players ==
=== Squad ===
As of 31 January 2022

Note: Flags indicate national team as defined under FIFA eligibility rules; some limited exceptions apply. Players may hold more than one non-FIFA nationality.

No.	Pos.	Nation	Player
1	GK	GER	Kevin Trapp
2	DF	FRA	Evan Ndicka
3	MF	AUT	Stefan Ilsanker
6	MF	CRO	Kristijan Jakić (on loan from Dinamo Zagreb)
7	MF	AUS	Ajdin Hrustic
8	MF	SUI	Djibril Sow
9	FW	NED	Sam Lammers (on loan from Atalanta)
10	MF	SRB	Filip Kostić
13	DF	AUT	Martin Hinteregger (vice-captain)
15	MF	JPN	Daichi Kamada
17	MF	GER	Sebastian Rode (captain)
18	DF	MLI	Almamy Touré
19	FW	COL	Rafael Santos Borré
20	MF	JPN	Makoto Hasebe (vice-captain)
21	FW	GER	Ragnar Ache
22	DF	USA	Timothy Chandler

No.	Pos.	Nation	Player
23	MF	NOR	Jens Petter Hauge (on loan from AC Milan)
24	DF	GER	Danny da Costa
25	DF	GER	Christopher Lenz
27	MF	MAR	Aymen Barkok
29	MF	DEN	Jesper Lindstrøm
31	GK	GER	Jens Grahl
35	DF	BRA	Tuta
36	MF	GER	Ansgar Knauff (on loan from Borussia Dortmund)
37	DF	GER	Erik Durm
38	MF	ESP	Enrique Herrero
39	FW	POR	Gonçalo Paciência
40	GK	GER	Diant Ramaj
46	MF	CYP	Antonio Foti
47	DF	GER	Jan Schröder
48	FW	GER	Gianluca Schäfer

=== Players out on loan ===
Note: Flags indicate national team as defined under FIFA eligibility rules; some limited exceptions apply. Players may hold more than one non-FIFA nationality.

No.	Pos.	Nation	Player
—	FW	TUR	Ali Akman (at NEC Nijmegen until 30 June 2022)
—	GK	GER	Elias Bördner (at Viktoria Köln until 30 June 2022)
—	MF	GER	Dominik Kohr (at Mainz 05 until 30 June 2022)
—	FW	GER	Igor Matanović (at FC St. Pauli until 30 June 2023)

No.	Pos.	Nation	Player
—	DF	GER	Fynn Otto (at Hallescher FC until 30 June 2022)
—	DF	GER	Martin Pečar (at Austria Wien until 30 June 2022)
—	MF	URU	Rodrigo Zalazar (at Schalke 04 until 30 June 2022)
—	MF	SUI	Steven Zuber (at AEK until 30 June 2022)

=== Transfers ===
==== In ====
No.	Pos	Player	Transferred from	Fee	Date	Source
6	MF	(Uruguay) Rodrigo Zalazar	(Germany) FC St. Pauli	Loan return	1 July 2021	
16	FW	(Serbia) Dejan Joveljić	(Austria) Wolfsberger AC	Loan return	1 July 2021	
23	GK	(Denmark) Frederik Rønnow	(Germany) FC Schalke 04	Loan return	1 July 2021	
24	DF	(Germany) Danny da Costa	(Germany) Mainz 05	Loan return	1 July 2021	
25	DF	(Germany) Christopher Lenz	(Germany) 1. FC Union Berlin	Free transfer	1 July 2021	
28	FW	(Spain) Fabio Blanco	(Spain) Valencia CF academy	Free transfer	1 July 2021	
30	FW	(Turkey) Ali Akman	(Turkey) Bursaspor	Free transfer	1 July 2021	
39	FW	(Portugal) Gonçalo Paciência	(Germany) FC Schalke 04	Loan return	1 July 2021	
40	GK	(Germany) Diant Ramaj	(Germany) 1. FC Heidenheim	Free transfer	1 July 2021	
41	MF	(Germany) Nils Stendera	(Germany) Lok Leipzig	Loan return	1 July 2021	
19	FW	(Colombia) Rafael Santos Borré	(Argentina) River Plate	Free transfer	5 July 2021	
29	MF	(Denmark) Jesper Lindstrøm	(Denmark) Brøndby IF	€7.0 million	11 July 2021	
31	GK	(Germany) Jens Grahl	(Germany) VfB Stuttgart	€250,000	19 July 2021	
23	MF	(Norway) Jens Petter Hauge	(Italy) AC Milan	Loan	10 August 2021	
48	FW	(Germany) Gianluca Schäfer	Academy	Free	20 August 2021	
47	DF	(Germany) Jan Schröder	Academy	Free	20 August 2021	
	FW	(Germany) Igor Matanović	(Germany) FC St. Pauli	€500,000	30 August 2021	
6	MF	(Croatia) Kristijan Jakić	(Croatia) Dinamo Zagreb	Loan	30 August 2021	
9	FW	(Netherlands) Sam Lammers	(Italy) Atalanta	Loan	31 August 2021	
46	MF	(Cyprus) Antonio Foti	Academy	Free	13 January 2022	
36	FW	(Germany) Ansgar Knauff	(Germany) Borussia Dortmund	Loan	20 January 2022	

==== Out ====
No.	Pos	Player	Transferred to	Fee	Date	Source
38	DF	(Germany) Yannick Brugger	(Austria) Admira Wacker	Free transfer	1 July 2021	
36	MF	(Austria) Lukas Fahrnberger		Free agent	1 July 2021	
9	FW	(Serbia) Luka Jović	(Spain) Real Madrid	Loan return	1 July 2021	
34	FW	(Angola) Jabez Makanda	(Germany) FK Pirmasens	Free transfer	1 July 2021	
23	GK	(Germany) Markus Schubert	(Germany) FC Schalke 04	Loan return	1 July 2021	
30	DF	(Netherlands) Jetro Willems	(Germany) SpVgg Greuther Fürth	Free transfer	1 July 2021	
33	FW	(Portugal) André Silva	(Germany) RB Leipzig	€23.0 million	2 July 2021	
40	GK	(Germany) Elias Bördner	(Germany) Viktoria Köln	Loan	6 July 2021	
23	GK	(Denmark) Frederik Rønnow	(Germany) 1. FC Union Berlin	€1.0 million	20 July 2021	
16	FW	(Serbia) Dejan Joveljić	(United States) LA Galaxy	€3.5 million	27 July 2021	
43	DF	(Germany) Fynn Otto	(Germany) Hallescher FC	Loan	4 August 2021	
6	MF	(Uruguay) Rodrigo Zalazar	(Germany) Schalke 04	Loan	4 August 2021	
30	FW	(Turkey) Ali Akman	(Netherlands) NEC Nijmegen	Loan	4 August 2021	
41	MF	(Germany) Nils Stendera	(Germany) Hessen Kassel	Undisclosed	5 August 2021	
42	MF	(Germany) Felix Irorere	(Germany) Karlsruher SC	Undisclosed	26 August 2021	
11	MF	(Switzerland) Steven Zuber	(Greece) AEK	Loan	30 August 2021	
	FW	(Germany) Igor Matanović	(Germany) FC St. Pauli	Loan	30 August 2021	
28	MF	(Spain) Fabio Blanco	(Spain) FC Barcelona B	€500,000	8 January 2022	
32	MF	(Germany) Amin Younes	(Italy) Napoli	Loan terminated	18 January 2022	
45	MF	(Slovenia) Martin Pečar	FK Austria Wien	Loan	7 February 2022	

== Friendly matches ==
Win Draw Loss

10 July 2021	Eintracht Frankfurt (Germany)	1–3	(Germany) SV Wehen Wiesbaden	Frankfurt, Germany
16:00 CEST (UTC+2)	Barkok 33' (pen.)	Report	Lankford 50'; Farouk 52', 72'	Stadium: Deutsche Bank Park; Attendance: 0

17 July 2021	Eintracht Frankfurt (Germany)	1–0	(Germany) SV Sandhausen	Frankfurt, Germany
16:00 CEST (UTC+2)	Kostić 32'	Report		Stadium: Deutsche Bank Park; Attendance: 0 Referee: Ballweg

20 July 2021	Eintracht Frankfurt (Germany)	6–1	(Germany) FC Gießen	Frankfurt, Germany
16:00 CEST (UTC+2)	Akman 1'; Paciência 7'; Lindstrøm 63'; Kamada 77'; Kostić 79'; Barkok 86'	Report	Münn 9'	Stadium: Deutsche Bank Park; Attendance: 0

24 July 2021	Eintracht Frankfurt (Germany)	2–3	(France) Strasbourg	Frankfurt, Germany
17:00 CEST (UTC+2)	Hrustic 6', 22'	Report	Ajorque 20'; Thomasson 52'; Diallo 82'	Stadium: Deutsche Bank Park; Attendance: 0

31 July 2021	Eintracht Frankfurt (Germany)	2–1	(France) Saint-Étienne	Frankfurt, Germany
15:30 CEST (UTC+2)	Lenz 12'; Borré 41' (pen.); Tuta (yellow card) 49'; Ndicka (yellow card) 59'	Report	Kolodziejczak 74'	Stadium: Deutsche Bank Park; Attendance: 10,000

27 January 2022	Mainz 05 (Germany)	0–1	(Germany) Eintracht Frankfurt	Mainz, Germany
14:00 CET (UTC+1)		Report	Tuta 74'	Stadium: Bruchwegstadion; Attendance: 0

24 March 2022	Eintracht Frankfurt (Germany)	1–1	(Germany) 1. FC Nürnberg	Frankfurt, Germany
16:00 CET (UTC+1)	Paciência 10'	Report	Köpke 81'	Stadium: Deutsche Bank Park; Attendance: 0

== Competitions ==
Win Draw Loss

=== Overall record ===
Competition	First match	Last match	Starting round	Final position	Record							
Competition	First match	Last match	Starting round	Final position	Pld	W	D	L	GF	GA	GD	Win %
Bundesliga	14 August 2021	14 May 2022	Matchday 1	11th	34	10	12	12	45	49	−4	29.41
DFB-Pokal	1 August 2022	1 August 2022	First round	First round	1	0	0	1	0	2	−2	0.00
UEFA Europa League	16 September 2021	18 May 2022	Group stage	Winners	13	7	6	0	21	13	+8	53.85
Total					48	17	18	13	66	64	+2	35.42

Source: Soccerway

=== Bundesliga ===
==== League table ====
Pos	Team	Pld	W	D	L	GF	GA	GD	Pts	Qualification or relegation
9	1899 Hoffenheim	34	13	7	14	58	60	−2	46	
10	Borussia Mönchengladbach	34	12	9	13	54	61	−7	45	
11	Eintracht Frankfurt	34	10	12	12	45	49	−4	42	Qualification for the Champions League group stage (Note: Eintracht Frankfurt qualified for the Champions League group stage by winning the UEFA Europa League.)
12	VfL Wolfsburg	34	12	6	16	43	54	−11	42	
13	VfL Bochum	34	12	6	16	38	52	−14	42	

Source: DFB
Rules for classification: 1) Points; 2) Goal difference; 3) Goals scored; 4) Head-to-head results; 5) Head-to-head away goals scored; 6) Away goals scored; 7) Play-off.

==== Results summary ====
Overall								Home						Away					
Pld	W	D	L	GF	GA	GD	Pts	W	D	L	GF	GA	GD	W	D	L	GF	GA	GD
34	10	12	12	45	49	−4	42	4	7	6	20	22	−2	6	5	6	25	27	−2

Source: Bundesliga

==== Results by round ====
Round	1	2	3	4	5	6	7	8	9	10	11	12	13	14	15	16	17	18	19	20	21	22	23	24	25	26	27	28	29	30	31	32	33	34
Ground	A	H	A	H	A	H	A	H	A	H	A	A	H	A	H	A	H	H	A	H	A	H	A	H	A	H	A	H	H	A	H	A	H	A
Result	L	D	D	D	D	D	W	L	L	D	W	W	W	L	W	W	W	L	D	L	W	L	L	L	W	W	D	D	L	L	D	L	D	D
Position	16	15	14	15	15	14	13	14	15	15	14	11	12	12	9	7	6	8	8	9	9	10	10	10	10	9	8	9	9	10	9	11	12	11

Source: DFB
A = Away; H = Home; W = Win; D = Draw; L = Loss

==== Matches ====
14 August 2021 1	Borussia Dortmund	5–2	Eintracht Frankfurt	Dortmund
18:30 CEST (UTC+2)	Reus 23'; Hazard 32'; Haaland 34', 72'; Reyna 58'	Report	Passlack 27' (o.g.); Hauge 86'	Stadium: Westfalenstadion; Attendance: 25,000; Referee: Tobias Stieler

21 August 2021 2	Eintracht Frankfurt	0–0	FC Augsburg	Frankfurt
15:30 CEST (UTC+2)	Borré (yellow card) 19'; Sow (yellow card) 67'; Lenz (yellow card) 87'	Report	Framberger (yellow card) 9'; Gumny (yellow card) 49'; Gruezo (yellow card) 55'	Stadium: Deutsche Bank Park; Attendance: 22,000; Referee: Harm Osmers

28 August 2021 3	Arminia Bielefeld	1–1	Eintracht Frankfurt	Bielefeld
15:30 CEST (UTC+2)	Wimmer 86'	Report	Ndicka (yellow card) 7'; Hauge 22'; Lenz (yellow card) 45'; Hrustic (yellow card) 90+7'	Stadium: Bielefelder Alm; Attendance: 13,750; Referee: Bastian Dankert

12 September 2021 4	Eintracht Frankfurt	1–1	VfB Stuttgart	Frankfurt
15:30 CEST (UTC+2)	Lenz (yellow card) 57'; Kostić 79'	Report	Marmoush (yellow card) 32', (goal) 88'; Anton (yellow card) 36', (red card) 82'; Coulibaly (yellow card) 69'; Mangala (yellow card) 77'	Stadium: Deutsche Bank Park; Attendance: 25,000; Referee: Matthias Jöllenbeck

19 September 2021 5	VfL Wolfsburg	1–1	Eintracht Frankfurt	Wolfsburg
19:30 CEST (UTC+2)	Waldschmidt (yellow card) 35'; Guilavogui (yellow card) 51'; Weghorst 70'	Report	Da Costa (yellow card) 9'; Sow (yellow card) 29'; Lammers 38'; Jakić (yellow card) 45+1'; Durm (yellow card) 53'; Hinteregger (yellow card) 68'; Ndicka (yellow card) 88'	Stadium: Volkswagen Arena; Attendance: 9,266; Referee: Felix Zwayer

25 September 2021 6	Eintracht Frankfurt	1–1	1. FC Köln	Frankfurt
15:30 CEST (UTC+2)	Chandler (yellow card) 25'; Borré 45+7'; Hinteregger (yellow card) 80'	Report	Skhiri 14'; Ljubicic (yellow card) 37'; Ehizibue (yellow card) 77'; Andersson (yellow card) 86'	Stadium: Deutsche Bank Park; Attendance: 24,000; Referee: Martin Petersen

3 October 2021 7	Bayern Munich	1–2	Eintracht Frankfurt	Munich
17:30 CEST (UTC+2)	Goretzka 29'; Davies (yellow card) 50'; Upamecano (yellow card) 77'	Report	Hinteregger 32'; Hauge (yellow card) 78'; Kostić 83'	Stadium: Allianz Arena; Attendance: 25,000; Referee: Florian Badstübner

16 October 2021 8	Eintracht Frankfurt	1–2	Hertha BSC	Frankfurt
15:30 CEST (UTC+2)	Jakić (yellow card) 29'; Paciência 78' (pen.)	Report	Richter 7', (yellow card) 40'; Ekkelenkamp 63'; Schwolow (yellow card) 90'	Stadium: Deutsche Bank Park; Attendance: 32,000; Referee: Deniz Aytekin

24 October 2021 9	VfL Bochum	2–0	Eintracht Frankfurt	Bochum
19:30 CEST (UTC+2)	Blum 3'; Polter 90+2'	Report	Paciência (penalty missed) 11'; Sow (yellow card) 45+1'; Kostić (yellow card) 73'	Stadium: Ruhrstadion; Attendance: 19,510; Referee: Marco Fritz

30 October 2021 10	Eintracht Frankfurt	1–1	RB Leipzig	Frankfurt
18:30 CEST (UTC+2)	Trapp (yellow card) 69'; Tuta 90+4'	Report	Poulsen 35'; Gulácsi (yellow card) 90+3'	Stadium: Deutsche Bank Park; Attendance: 31,000; Referee: Daniel Schlager

7 November 2021 11	Greuther Fürth	1–2	Eintracht Frankfurt	Fürth
19:30 CEST (UTC+2)	Sarpei (yellow card) 37'; Christiansen (yellow card) 65'; Hrgota (yellow card) 87'; Griesbeck (yellow card) 88'; Itten 90+2'	Report	Rode 75'; Jakić (yellow card) 89'; Borré 90+4'	Stadium: Sportpark Ronhof; Attendance: 10,244; Referee: Daniel Siebert

21 November 2021 12	SC Freiburg	0–2	Eintracht Frankfurt	Freiburg
15:30 CEST (UTC+2)		Report	Lindstrøm 34'; Kostić 43'; Chandler (yellow card) 49'; Tuta (yellow card) 53'; Touré (yellow card) 69'; Trapp (yellow card) 73'	Stadium: SC-Stadion; Attendance: 32,500; Referee: Florian Badstübner

28 November 2021 13	Eintracht Frankfurt	2–1	Union Berlin	Frankfurt
15:30 CET (UTC+1)	Sow 22'; Ndicka 90+5'	Report	Prömel (yellow card) 39'; Knoche (yellow card) 59'; Kruse 62' (pen.); Luthe (yellow card) 90+3'; Becker (yellow card) 90+4'	Stadium: Deutsche Bank Park; Attendance: 24,000; Referee: Sascha Stegemann

4 December 2021 14	1899 Hoffenheim	3–2	Eintracht Frankfurt	Sinsheim
15:30 CET (UTC+1)	Geiger (yellow card) 6', (goal) 24'; Samassékou (yellow card) 19', (goal) 59'; Rutter 30'	Report	Borré 15'; Sow (yellow card) 29'; Paciência (yellow card) 64', (goal) 72'	Stadium: Rhein-Neckar-Arena; Attendance: 0 Referee: Daniel Schlager

12 December 2021 15	Eintracht Frankfurt	5–2	Bayer Leverkusen	Frankfurt
17:30 CET (UTC+1)	Tuta 23'; Lindstrøm 30'; Ndicka 50'; Jakić 66'; Sow 76'	Report	Schick 5', 22' (pen.); Frimpong (yellow card) 48'; Aránguiz (yellow card) 55'; Hincapié (yellow card) 61'	Stadium: Deutsche Bank Park; Attendance: 12,000; Referee: Marco Fritz

15 December 2021 16	Borussia Mönchengladbach	2–3	Eintracht Frankfurt	Mönchengladbach
20:30 CET (UTC+1)	Neuhaus 6'; Embolo (yellow card) 43'; Bensebaini 54' (pen.); Koné (yellow card) 63'	Report	Borré (yellow card) 42'; Borré 45'; Lindstrøm 50'; Kamada 55'; Tuta (yellow card) 70' (yellow-red card); Da Costa (yellow card) 72'; Lenz (yellow card) 90+3'	Stadium: Borussia-Park; Attendance: 10,028; Referee: Martin Petersen

18 December 2021 17	Eintracht Frankfurt	1–0	Mainz 05	Frankfurt
15:30 CET (UTC+1)	Lindstrøm 34'	Report	Martín (yellow card) 90+3'	Stadium: Deutsche Bank Park; Attendance: 15,000; Referee: Felix Brych

8 January 2022 18	Eintracht Frankfurt	2–3	Borussia Dortmund	Frankfurt
18:30 CET (UTC+1)	Borré 15', 24', (yellow card) 90'; Hinteregger (yellow card) 87'; Chandler (yellow card) 88'	Report	Hazard 71', (yellow card) 90'; Bellingham 87'; Haaland (yellow card) 87'; Dahoud 89'	Stadium: Deutsche Bank Park; Attendance: 250; Referee: Robert Schröder

16 January 2022 19	FC Augsburg	1–1	Eintracht Frankfurt	Augsburg
15:30 CET (UTC+1)	Gregoritsch (yellow card) 15', (goal) 38'; Zeqiri (yellow card) 36'; Niederlechner (yellow card) 73'	Report	Kamada 22'; Chandler (yellow card) 40'; Touré (yellow card) 49'; Tuta (yellow card) 90'	Stadium: WWK Arena; Attendance: 0 Referee: Sven Jablonski

21 January 2022 20	Eintracht Frankfurt	0–2	Arminia Bielefeld	Frankfurt
20:30 CET (UTC+1)	Rode (yellow card) 51'; Hasebe (yellow card) 80'; Kostić (yellow card) 90+4'; Paciência (yellow card) 90+4'	Report	Wimmer 5'; Schöpf 27'; Andrade (yellow card) 73'; Nilsson (yellow card) 90+4'	Stadium: Deutsche Bank Park; Attendance: 1,000; Referee: Tobias Reichel

5 February 2022 21	VfB Stuttgart	2–3	Eintracht Frankfurt	Stuttgart
15:30 CET (UTC+1)	Anton 42'; Kalajdžić 70'	Report	Ndicka 7'; Hrustic 47', 77'	Stadium: Mercedes-Benz Arena; Attendance: 10,000; Referee: Sascha Stegemann

12 February 2022 22	Eintracht Frankfurt	0–2	VfL Wolfsburg	Frankfurt
15:30 CET (UTC+1)	Jakić (yellow card) 69'	Report	Kruse 28' (pen.); Brooks (yellow card) 43'; Lukebakio 90+3'; Steffen (yellow card) 90+6'	Stadium: Deutsche Bank Park; Attendance: 10,000; Referee: Frank Willenborg

19 February 2022 23	1. FC Köln	1–0	Eintracht Frankfurt	Cologne
18:30 CET (UTC+1)	Andersson (yellow card) 46'; Modeste 84'	Report	Hinteregger (yellow card) 63'; Jakić (yellow card) 89'	Stadium: RheinEnergieStadion; Attendance: 10,000; Referee: Christian Dingert

26 February 2022 24	Eintracht Frankfurt	0–1	Bayern Munich	Frankfurt
18:30 CET (UTC+1)	Lenz (yellow card) 32'	Report	Hernandez (yellow card) 32'; Kimmich (yellow card) 64'; Sané 71'	Stadium: Deutsche Bank Park; Attendance: 25,000; Referee: Florian Badstübner

5 March 2022 25	Hertha BSC	1–4	Eintracht Frankfurt	Berlin
15:30 CET (UTC+1)	Boateng (yellow card) 61'; Selke 61'; Mittelstädt (yellow card) 73'	Report	Knauff 17'; Tuta 48'; Lindstrøm 56'; Borré 63'; Hauge (yellow card) 73'; Lammers (yellow card) 84'	Stadium: Olympiastadion; Attendance: 25,000; Referee: Harm Osmers

13 March 2022 26	Eintracht Frankfurt	2–1	VfL Bochum	Frankfurt
17:30 CET (UTC+1)	Sow (yellow card) 25'; Mašović 46' (o.g.); Kamada 52'; Borré (yellow card) 73'; Paciência (yellow card) 90+3'	Report	Polter 19'; Losilla (yellow card) 30'; Osterhage (yellow card) 45+1'; Bockhorn (yellow card) 65'; Bella-Kotchap (yellow card) 90+3'	Stadium: Deutsche Bank Park; Attendance: 24,000; Referee: Marco Fritz

20 March 2022 27	RB Leipzig	0–0	Eintracht Frankfurt	Leipzig
15:30 CET (UTC+1)	Laimer (yellow card) 19'	Report	Ndicka (yellow card) 35'; Hinteregger (yellow card) 50'; Hrustic (yellow card) 56'; Hauge (yellow card) 90+1'; Jakić (yellow card) 90+3'	Stadium: Red Bull Arena; Attendance: 43,058; Referee: Christian Dingert

2 April 2022 28	Eintracht Frankfurt	0–0	Greuther Fürth	Frankfurt
15:30 CEST (UTC+2)	Hauge (yellow card) 88'	Report		Stadium: Deutsche Bank Park; Attendance: 50,500; Referee: Bastian Dankert

10 April 2022 29	Eintracht Frankfurt	1–2	SC Freiburg	Frankfurt
17:30 CEST (UTC+2)	Hinteregger (yellow card) 45+4'; Kostić 54'	Report	Grifo 27'; Demirović (yellow card) 45+4'; Petersen 69'; Lienhart (yellow card) 83'	Stadium: Deutsche Bank Park; Attendance: 47,000; Referee: Felix Brych

17 April 2022 30	Union Berlin	2–0	Eintracht Frankfurt	Berlin
17:30 CEST (UTC+2)	Awoniyi 17'; Prömel 21'; Baumgartl (yellow card) 71'; Michel (yellow card) 90+2'	Report	Lenz (yellow card) 70'	Stadium: Stadion An der Alten Försterei; Attendance: 22,000; Referee: Frank Willenborg

23 April 2022 31	Eintracht Frankfurt	2–2	1899 Hoffenheim	Frankfurt
15:30 CEST (UTC+2)	Ndicka 32'; Borré (yellow card) 52'; Kamada 66'	Report	Ndicka 12' (o.g.); Posch (yellow card) 52'; Stiller (yellow card) 62'; Rutter 78'; Skov (yellow card) 90+1'	Stadium: Deutsche Bank Park; Attendance: 50,500; Referee: Sven Jablonski

2 May 2022 32	Bayer Leverkusen	2–0	Eintracht Frankfurt	Leverkusen
20:30 CEST (UTC+2)	Paulinho 18'; Schick 51'	Report		Stadium: BayArena; Attendance: 26,492; Referee: Benjamin Cortus

8 May 2022 33	Eintracht Frankfurt	1–1	Borussia Mönchengladbach	Frankfurt
15:30 CEST (UTC+2)	Ilsanker (yellow card) 56'; Paciência 66'	Report	Pléa 4'	Stadium: Deutsche Bank Park; Attendance: 51,500; Referee: Felix Zwayer

14 May 2022 34	Mainz 05	2–2	Eintracht Frankfurt	Mainz
15:30 CEST (UTC+2)	Ingvartsen 10', 49'; Martín (yellow card) 50'; Bell (yellow card) 56'	Report	Tuta 26'; Borré 35'	Stadium: Opel Arena; Attendance: 33,305; Referee: Martin Petersen

=== DFB-Pokal ===
8 August 2021 Round 1	Waldhof Mannheim	2–0	Eintracht Frankfurt	Mannheim
15:30 CEST (UTC+2)	Rossipal (yellow card) 21'; Seegert 48'; Boyamba 52'	Report	Tuta (yellow card) 8'; Lenz (yellow card) 12'; Hinteregger (yellow card) 26' (yellow-red card) 62'; Rode (yellow card) 42'	Stadium: Carl-Benz-Stadion; Attendance: 11,000; Referee: Sascha Stegemann

=== UEFA Europa League ===
==== Group stage ====
Pos	Team	Pld	W	D	L	GF	GA	GD	Pts	Qualification	FRA	OLY	FEN	ANT
1	(Germany) Eintracht Frankfurt	6	3	3	0	10	6	+4	12	Advance to round of 16	—	3–1	1–1	2–2
2	(Greece) Olympiacos	6	3	0	3	8	7	+1	9	Advance to knockout round play-offs	1–2	—	1–0	2–1
3	(Turkey) Fenerbahçe	6	1	3	2	7	8	−1	6	Transfer to Europa Conference League	1–1	0–3	—	2–2
4	(Belgium) Antwerp	6	1	2	3	6	10	−4	5		0–1	1–0	0–3	—

Source: UEFA
Rules for classification: Group stage tiebreakers

16 September 2021 1	Eintracht Frankfurt (Germany)	1–1	(Turkey) Fenerbahçe	Frankfurt, Germany
21:00 CEST (UTC+2)	Lammers 41'; Jakić (yellow card) 90+6'; Hrustic (yellow card) 90+6'	Report	Özil 10'; Meyer (yellow card) 83'; Luiz Gustavo (yellow card) 86'; Osayi-Samuel (yellow card) 90+5'; Özer (yellow card) 90+6'	Stadium: Deutsche Bank Park; Attendance: 25,000; Referee: Maurizio Mariani (Italy)

30 September 2021 2	Antwerp (Belgium)	0–1	(Germany) Eintracht Frankfurt	Antwerp, Belgium
18:45 CEST (UTC+2)	Nainggolan (yellow card) 29'; Frey (yellow card) 90+7'; Verstraete (yellow card) 90+7'	Report	Paciência 90+1' (pen.), (yellow card) 90+5'	Stadium: Bosuilstadion; Attendance: 13,500; Referee: Jakob Kehlet (Denmark)

21 October 2021 3	Eintracht Frankfurt (Germany)	3–1	(Greece) Olympiacos	Frankfurt, Germany
21:00 CEST (UTC+2)	Borré 26' (pen.); Paciência (yellow card) 35'; Touré 45+3'; Tuta (yellow card) 50'; Kamada 59'	Report	Cissé (yellow card) 25'; El-Arabi 30' (pen.); Papastathopoulos (yellow card) 39'; Camara (yellow card) 48'; Kunde (yellow card) 84'	Stadium: Deutsche Bank Park; Attendance: 35,000; Referee: Tiago Martins (Portugal)

4 November 2021 4	Olympiacos (Greece)	1–2	(Germany) Eintracht Frankfurt	Piraeus, Greece
18:45 CEST (UTC+2)	El-Arabi 12'	Report	Kamada 17'; Barkok (yellow card) 32'; Hauge 90+2'; Trapp (yellow card) 90+4'	Stadium: Karaiskakis Stadium; Attendance: 25,000; Referee: Aleksei Kulbakov (Belarus)

25 November 2021 5	Eintracht Frankfurt (Germany)	2–2	(Belgium) Antwerp	Frankfurt, Germany
21:00 CEST (UTC+2)	Kamada 11'; Paciência 90+3'	Report	Nainggolan 33'; Dessoleil (yellow card) 59'; Frey (yellow card) 83'; Samatta 88'	Stadium: Deutsche Bank Park; Attendance: 30,000; Referee: Paul Tierney (England)

9 December 2021 6	Fenerbahçe (Turkey)	1–1	(Germany) Eintracht Frankfurt	Istanbul, Turkey
18:45 CEST (UTC+2)	Berisha 42'; Pelkas (yellow card) 38'; Sosa (yellow card) 44'	Report	Sow 29'; Chandler (yellow card) 54'; Ndicka (yellow card) 60'; Paciência (yellow card) 90+2'	Stadium: Şükrü Saracoğlu Stadium; Attendance: 15,000; Referee: Srđan Jovanović (Serbia)

==== Knockout phase ====
===== Round of 16 =====
9 March 2022 First leg	Real Betis (Spain)	1–2	(Germany) Eintracht Frankfurt	Seville, Spain
18:45 CET (UTC+1)	Fekir (yellow card) 23', (goal) 30'	Report	Kostić 14'; Sow (yellow card) 25'; Kamada 32'; Borré (penalty missed) 52'; Hinteregger (yellow card) 75'	Stadium: Benito Villamarín; Attendance: 36,574; Referee: Marco Guida (Italy)

17 March 2022 Second leg	Eintracht Frankfurt (Germany)	1–1 (a.e.t.) (3–2 agg.)	(Spain) Real Betis	Frankfurt, Germany
21:00 CET (UTC+1)	Rodríguez 120+1' (o.g.)	Report	Juanmi (yellow card) 63'; Pezzella (yellow card) 70'; Iglesias 90'; Ruibal (yellow card) 112'; Rodríguez (yellow card) 120'	Stadium: Deutsche Bank Park; Attendance: 25,000; Referee: Michael Oliver (England)

===== Quarter-finals =====
7 April 2022 First leg	Eintracht Frankfurt (Germany)	1–1	(Spain) Barcelona	Frankfurt, Germany
21:00 CEST (UTC+2)	Kostić (yellow card) 45+2'; Knauff 48'; Tuta (yellow card) 61' (yellow-red card) 78'; Jakić (yellow card) 82'	Report	Torres 61'	Stadium: Deutsche Bank Park; Attendance: 48,000; Referee: Srđan Jovanović (Serbia)

14 April 2022 Second leg	Barcelona (Spain)	2–3 (3–4 agg.)	(Germany) Eintracht Frankfurt	Barcelona, Spain
21:00 CEST (UTC+2)	García (yellow card) 3'; Gavi (yellow card) 28'; Busquets 90+1'; Dembélé (yellow card) 90+4'; Depay 90+11' (pen.)	Report	Kostić 4' (pen.), 67'; Jakić (yellow card) 24'; Borré 36'; Hrustic (yellow card) 83'; Ndicka (yellow card) 90+5' (yellow-red card) 90+10'; Knauff (yellow card) 90+5'; Trapp (yellow card) 90+11'	Stadium: Camp Nou; Attendance: 79,468; Referee: Artur Soares Dias (Portugal)

===== Semi-finals =====
28 April 2022 First leg	West Ham United (England)	1–2	(Germany) Eintracht Frankfurt	London, England
20:00 BST (UTC+1)	Antonio 21'	Report	Knauff 1'; Kamada 54'; Sow (yellow card) 79'; Hinteregger (yellow card) 81'	Stadium: London Stadium; Attendance: 58,108; Referee: Serdar Gözübüyük (Netherlands)

5 May 2022 Second leg	Eintracht Frankfurt (Germany)	1–0 (3–1 agg.)	(England) West Ham United	Frankfurt, Germany
21:00 CEST (UTC+2)	Borré 26'; Ndicka (yellow card) 43'; Rode (yellow card) 66'; Chandler (yellow card) 78'; Knauff (yellow card) 82'; Trapp (yellow card) 90+1'	Report	Cresswell (red card) 17'; Rice (yellow card) 45+3'; Antonio (yellow card) 78'; Benrahma (yellow card) 81'	Stadium: Deutsche Bank Park; Attendance: 48,000; Referee: Jesús Gil Manzano (Spain)

===== Final =====
18 May 2022 Final	Eintracht Frankfurt (Germany)	1–1 (a.e.t.) (5–4 p)	(Scotland) Rangers	Seville, Spain
21:00 CEST (UTC+2)	Borré 69'	Report	Aribo 57', (yellow card) 62'; Wright (yellow card) 73'	Stadium: Ramón Sánchez Pizjuán; Attendance: 38,842; Referee: Slavko Vinčić (Slovenia)
	Penalties
	Lenz (penalty scored); Hrustic (penalty scored); Kamada (penalty scored); Kostić (penalty scored); Borré (penalty scored)		(penalty scored) Tavernier; (penalty scored) Davis; (penalty scored) Arfield; (penalty missed) Ramsey; (penalty scored) Roofe

== Statistics ==
=== Appearances and goals ===
No.	Pos	Nat	Player	Total		Bundesliga		DFB-Pokal		UEFA Europa League	
No.	Pos	Nat	Player	Apps	Goals	Apps	Goals	Apps	Goals	Apps	Goals
Goalkeepers
1	GK	(Germany) GER	Kevin Trapp	46	0	32	0	1	0	13	0
31	GK	(Germany) GER	Jens Grahl	1	0	1	0	0	0	0	0
40	GK	(Germany) GER	Diant Ramaj	1	0	1	0	0	0	0	0
Defenders
2	DF	(Ivory Coast) CIV	Evan Ndicka	44	4	32	4	1	0	10+1	0
13	DF	(Austria) AUT	Martin Hinteregger	37	1	25+2	1	1	0	9	0
18	DF	(Mali) MLI	Almamy Touré	18	1	5+5	0	0	0	5+3	1
22	DF	(United States) USA	Timothy Chandler	22	0	15+2	0	0	0	4+1	0
24	DF	(Germany) GER	Danny da Costa	14	0	7+4	0	1	0	1+1	0
25	DF	(Germany) GER	Christopher Lenz	18	0	6+9	0	1	0	0+2	0
35	DF	(Brazil) BRA	Tuta	38	4	26	4	1	0	10+1	0
37	DF	(Germany) GER	Erik Durm	9	0	7	0	0	0	1+1	0
Midfielders
3	MF	(Austria) AUT	Stefan Ilsanker	14	0	3+9	0	0	0	0+2	0
6	MF	(Croatia) CRO	Kristijan Jakić	38	1	21+5	1	0	0	10+2	0
7	MF	(Australia) AUS	Ajdin Hrustic	28	2	9+14	2	0	0	1+4	0
8	MF	(Switzerland) SUI	Djibril Sow	44	3	28+3	2	1	0	12	1
10	MF	(Serbia) SRB	Filip Kostić	43	7	28+3	4	0	0	12	3
15	MF	(Japan) JPN	Daichi Kamada	46	9	23+9	4	1	0	12+1	5
17	MF	(Germany) GER	Sebastian Rode	28	1	10+7	1	1	0	4+6	0
20	MF	(Japan) JPN	Makoto Hasebe	26	0	12+6	0	0+1	0	5+2	0
23	MF	(Norway) NOR	Jens Petter Hauge	38	3	9+17	2	0	0	2+10	1
27	MF	(Morocco) MAR	Aymen Barkok	7	0	2+3	0	0+1	0	1+0	0
29	MF	(Denmark) DEN	Jesper Lindstrøm	39	5	26+3	5	1	0	7+2	0
36	MF	(Germany) GER	Ansgar Knauff	19	3	9+3	1	0	0	7	2
38	MF	(Spain) ESP	Enrique Herrera	0	0	0	0	0	0	0	0
46	MF	(Cyprus) CYP	Antonio Foti	0	0	0	0	0	0	0	0
Forwards
9	FW	(Netherlands) NED	Sam Lammers	22	2	5+10	1	0	0	3+4	1
19	FW	(Colombia) COL	Rafael Santos Borré	45	12	28+3	8	1	0	13	4
21	FW	(Germany) GER	Ragnar Ache	16	0	1+12	0	0	0	0+3	0
39	FW	(Portugal) POR	Gonçalo Paciência	26	5	4+14	3	0+2	0	1+5	2
Players transferred out during the season
11	MF	(Switzerland) SUI	Steven Zuber	1	0	0	0	0+1	0	0	0
28	MF	(Spain) ESP	Fabio Blanco	0	0	0	0	0	0	0	0
32	MF	(Germany) GER	Amin Younes	1	0	0	0	0+1	0	0	0
42	DF	(Germany) GER	Felix Irorere	0	0	0	0	0	0	0	0
45	MF	(Slovenia) SLO	Martin Pečar	0	0	0	0	0	0	0	0

Last updated: 18 May 2022
Source: Competitions

=== Goalscorers ===
Rank	No.	Pos	Nat	Player	Bundesliga	DFB-Pokal	UEFA Europa League	Total
1	19	FW	(Colombia)	Rafael Santos Borré	8	0	4	12
2	15	MF	(Japan)	Daichi Kamada	4	0	5	9
3	10	MF	(Serbia)	Filip Kostić	4	0	3	7
4	29	MF	(Denmark)	Jesper Lindstrøm	5	0	0	5
4	39	FW	(Portugal)	Gonçalo Paciência	3	0	2	5
6	2	DF	(France)	Evan Ndicka	4	0	0	4
6	35	DF	(Brazil)	Tuta	4	0	0	4
8	8	MF	(Switzerland)	Djibril Sow	2	0	1	3
8	23	MF	(Norway)	Jens Petter Hauge	2	0	1	3
10	7	MF	(Australia)	Ajdin Hrustić	2	0	0	2
10	9	FW	(Netherlands)	Sam Lammers	1	0	1	2
10	36	MF	(Germany)	Ansgar Knauff	1	0	1	2
13	6	MF	(Croatia)	Kristijan Jakić	1	0	0	1
13	13	DF	(Austria)	Martin Hinteregger	1	0	0	1
13	17	MF	(Germany)	Sebastian Rode	1	0	0	1
13	18	DF	(Mali)	Almamy Touré	0	0	1	1
Own goals					2	0	1	3
Totals					44	0	18	62

Last updated: 18 May 2022

=== Clean sheets ===
Rank	No.	Pos	Nat	Player	Bundesliga	DFB-Pokal	UEFA Europa League	Total
1	1	GK	(Germany)	Kevin Trapp	4	0	2	6
2	31	GK	(Germany)	Jens Grahl	0	0	0	0
2	40	GK	(Germany)	Diant Ramaj	0	0	0	0
Totals					4	0	2	6

Last updated: 18 May 2022

=== Disciplinary record ===
No.	Pos	Nat	Player	Bundesliga			DFB-Pokal			UEFA Europa League			Total		
No.	Pos	Nat	Player	Yellow card	(yellow card) (yellow-red card)	Red card	Yellow card	(yellow card) (yellow-red card)	Red card	Yellow card	(yellow card) (yellow-red card)	Red card	Yellow card	(yellow card) (yellow-red card)	Red card
Totals
1	GK	(Germany)	Kevin Trapp	2	0	0	0	0	0	3	0	0	5	0	0
2	DF	(France)	Evan Ndicka	3	0	0	0	0	0	2	1	0	5	1	0
3	MF	(Austria)	Stefan Ilsanker	1	0	0	0	0	0	0	0	0	1	0	0
6	MF	(Croatia)	Kristijan Jakić	6	0	0	0	0	0	3	0	0	9	0	0
7	MF	(Australia)	Ajdin Hrustic	2	0	0	0	0	0	2	0	0	4	0	0
8	MF	(Switzerland)	Djibril Sow	5	0	0	0	0	0	2	0	0	7	0	0
9	FW	(Netherlands)	Sam Lammers	1	0	0	0	0	0	0	0	0	1	0	0
10	MF	(Serbia)	Filip Kostić	2	0	0	0	0	0	1	0	0	3	0	0
11	MF	(Switzerland)	Steven Zuber	0	0	0	0	0	0	0	0	0	0	0	0
13	DF	(Austria)	Martin Hinteregger	6	0	0	0	1	0	2	0	0	8	1	0
15	MF	(Japan)	Daichi Kamada	0	0	0	0	0	0	0	0	0	0	0	0
17	MF	(Germany)	Sebastian Rode	1	0	0	1	0	0	1	0	0	3	0	0
18	DF	(Mali)	Almamy Touré	2	0	0	0	0	0	0	0	0	2	0	0
19	FW	(Colombia)	Rafael Santos Borré	5	0	0	0	0	0	0	0	0	5	0	0
20	MF	(Japan)	Makoto Hasebe	1	0	0	0	0	0	0	0	0	1	0	0
22	DF	(United States)	Timothy Chandler	4	0	0	0	0	0	2	0	0	6	0	0
23	MF	(Norway)	Jens Petter Hauge	4	0	0	0	0	0	0	0	0	4	0	0
24	DF	(Germany)	Danny da Costa	2	0	0	0	0	0	0	0	0	2	0	0
25	DF	(Germany)	Christopher Lenz	6	0	0	1	0	0	0	0	0	7	0	0
27	MF	(Morocco)	Aymen Barkok	0	0	0	0	0	0	1	0	0	1	0	0
28	MF	(Spain)	Fabio Blanco	0	0	0	0	0	0	0	0	0	0	0	0
29	MF	(Denmark)	Jesper Lindstrøm	0	0	0	0	0	0	0	0	0	0	0	0
31	GK	(Germany)	Jens Grahl	0	0	0	0	0	0	0	0	0	0	0	0
32	MF	(Germany)	Amin Younes	0	0	0	0	0	0	0	0	0	0	0	0
35	DF	(Brazil)	Tuta	2	1	0	1	0	0	1	1	0	4	2	0
36	MF	(Germany)	Ansgar Knauff	0	0	0	0	0	0	2	0	0	2	0	0
37	DF	(Germany)	Erik Durm	1	0	0	0	0	0	0	0	0	1	0	0
38	MF	(Spain)	Enrique Herrera	0	0	0	0	0	0	0	0	0	0	0	0
39	FW	(Portugal)	Gonçalo Paciência	3	0	0	0	0	0	3	0	0	6	0	0
40	GK	(Germany)	Diant Ramaj	0	0	0	0	0	0	0	0	0	0	0	0
42	DF	(Germany)	Felix Irorere	0	0	0	0	0	0	0	0	0	0	0	0
45	MF	(Slovenia)	Martin Pečar	0	0	0	0	0	0	0	0	0	0	0	0
46	MF	(Cyprus)	Antonio Foti	0	0	0	0	0	0	0	0	0	0	0	0
47	DF	(Germany)	Jan Schröder	0	0	0	0	0	0	0	0	0	0	0	0
48	FW	(Germany)	Gianluca Schäfer	0	0	0	0	0	0	0	0	0	0	0	0
Totals				61	1	0	3	1	0	17	0	0	82	3	0

Last updated: 18 May 2022
