= Jesper Lindstrøm =

Danish footballer (born 2000)

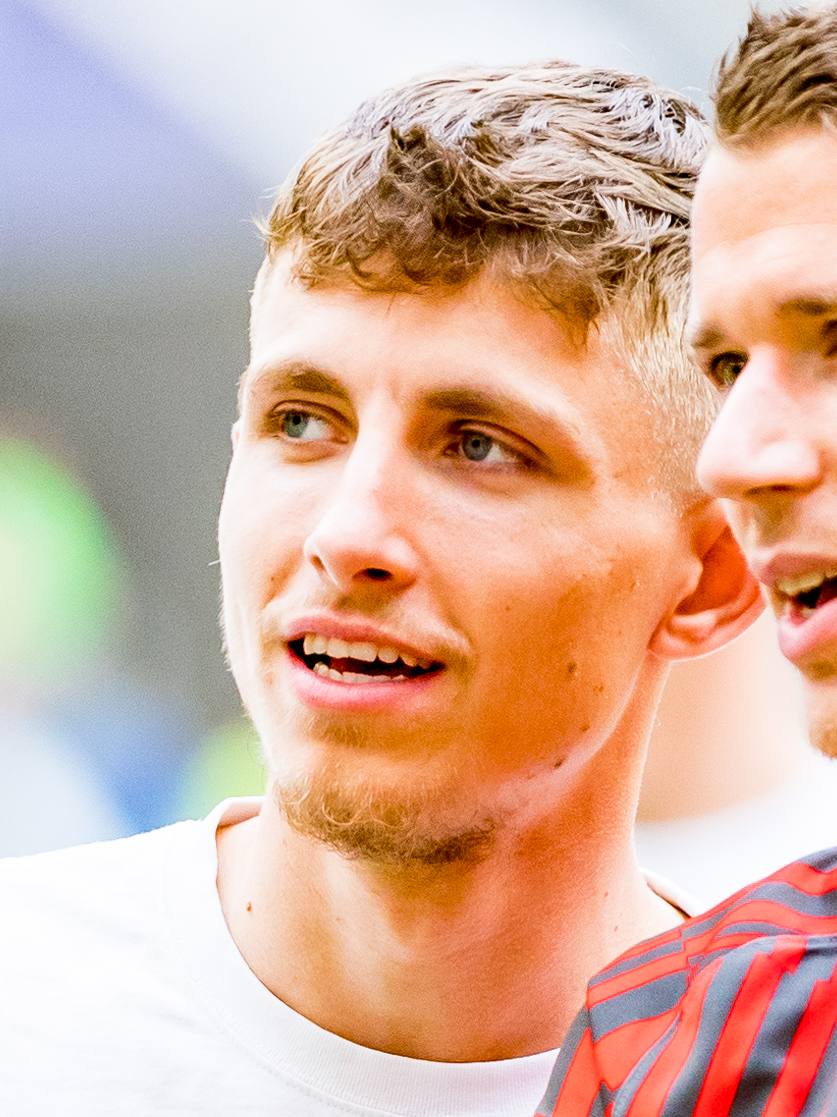
- Lindstrøm with Eintracht Frankfurt in 2022

Personal information
- Full name: Jesper Grænge Lindstrøm
- Date of birth: 29 February 2000 (age 26)
- Place of birth: Taastrup, Denmark
- Height: 1.82 m (6 ft 0 in)
- Position: Attacking midfielder

Team information
- Current team: Red Bull Salzburg (on loan from Napoli)
- Number: 35

Youth career
- 2003–2006: Tåstrup B.70
- 2007: BSI
- 2007–2012: Vallensbæk IF
- 2012–2019: Brøndby

Senior career*
Years	Team	Apps	(Gls)
2019–2021	Brøndby	57	(13)
2021–2023	Eintracht Frankfurt	57	(12)
2023–	Napoli	22	(0)
2024–2025	→ Everton (loan)	25	(0)
2025–2026	→ VfL Wolfsburg (loan)	13	(0)
2026–	→ Red Bull Salzburg (loan)	4	(1)

International career^{‡}
2018–2019	Denmark U19	3	(0)
2020–2021	Denmark U21	10	(2)
2020–	Denmark	18	(1)
- * Club domestic league appearances and goals as of 19:16, 25 October 2026 (UTC) ‡ National team caps and goals as of 23:36, 23 March 2025 (UTC)

Jesper Grænge Lindstrøm (Danish pronunciation: [ˈle̝nˌstʁɶmˀ]; born 29 February 2000) is a Danish professional footballer who plays as an attacking midfielder for Austrian Bundesliga club Red Bull Salzburg, on loan from Serie A club Napoli. He also plays for the Denmark national team.

Lindstrøm played youth football at several smaller clubs in the Vestegnen area of the Capital Region of Denmark, before joining Brøndby's academy where he made his first-team debut in 2018. After winning a Danish championship with Brøndby in 2021, the attacking midfielder moved to Bundesliga club Eintracht Frankfurt the same year. With Frankfurt, Lindstrøm won the UEFA Europa League in 2022 before joining Serie A club Napoli in 2023. A year later, he moved to Everton on a season-long loan with an option to buy.

Lindstrøm made his full international debut for Denmark on 11 November 2020 against Sweden. He has also represented Denmark at under-19 and under-21 levels.

== Club career ==
=== Brøndby ===
==== Early career ====
Lindstrøm began his career at Tåstrup B.70 at age three, close to where he lived with his family in Høje-Taastrup. When his parents divorced, he moved to Brøndby with his mother as a six-year-old, and began playing for BSI within a stone's throw from his new home. He only played there for six months, as the school he attended closed, and he joined Vallensbæk IF closer to his new school on the recommendation of his stepfather's friend, coach Henrik From, the father of Rasmus From, a goalkeeper who has played for the Nordsjælland academy as well as VSK Aarhus. He then joined the academy at Danish top side Brøndby IF at under-13 level, a club which his family supported.

In August 2018, he signed a three-year contract with the club. He made his first team debut, aged 18, as a substitute in a 4–1 win over Danish third tier side BK Marienlyst in the Danish Cup on 22 November 2018. Eventually, he was promoted to the first team in the summer of 2019.

==== 2019–20 ====
Lindstrøm made his breakthrough for the first team in the 2019–20 season under new coach Niels Frederiksen. On 11 July, Lindstrøm made his first European appearance for Brøndby, coming on as a substitute in the first leg of their UEFA Europa League qualification round against Inter Turku. On 28 July, he made his first start and scored the first senior goal of his career to contribute to a 3–2 victory in a league match against OB. On 1 August, he came on as a substitute in the last minute of regulation and scored two goals in extra time as Brøndby defeated Lechia Gdańsk 4-1 (5-3 aggregate) in the second round of Europa League qualification. Due to his performances in the first months of the 2019–20 season, he received a lot of attention and was pointed out as the club's jóia da coroa (crown jewel) in a scouting report by Braga, Brøndby's opponent in Europa League qualifiers.

After the COVID-19 pandemic had suspended the Superliga for some months, Lindstrøm scored the club's first goal in competition after the return, securing a 1–0 win over SønderjyskE on 2 June 2020.

On 3 July 2020, Lindstrøm signed a new contract with Brøndby, keeping him at the club until 2023. He finished his first season at senior level with 33 total appearances in which he scored five goals.

==== 2020–21 ====
Lindstrøm started the 2020–21 season strong, as he scored the 1–1 equaliser in a 2–1 away win over rivals Copenhagen on the second-matchday of the season on 20 September 2020. After the match he stated that "[i]t's crazy. There is not much more to say. It's insane. It doesn't matter who scored the goals. Our win is the most important thing, and that we have started in the Superliga season with six points is insane." On 2 October, Lindstrøm was named Superliga Young Player of the Month for September, registering two goals and one assist during the month. He scored again on 24 October, in a 3–2 home loss to Midtjylland, his third goal of the season.

His strong form continued in November, with one-goal performances against OB and Vejle Boldklub and finally a brace on 30 November against Lyngby Boldklub to propel Brøndby to first place in the league table. His performances led to him being named Superliga Player of the Month for November, as well as Young Player of the Month. In December, he was voted the Tipsbladet Player of the Fall, the first time a Brøndby player won the award since Peter Graulund in 2000.

Lindstrøm continued in strong fashion during the championship play-offs, in which he was in the starting line-up in each of his seven appearances and scored one goal. At the end of the season, Brøndby claimed their first Danish Superliga title in 16 years, despite Lindstrøm being out with a suspension for the final two games of the season.

=== Eintracht Frankfurt ===
On 11 July 2021, it was announced via official channels that Lindstrøm had signed with Bundesliga club Eintracht Frankfurt on a five-year contract. He made his debut on 8 August in a 2–0 loss in the DFB-Pokal to 3. Liga club Waldhof Mannheim. His domestic league debut followed six days later, on the opening day of the Bundesliga, where he came on as a half-time substitute for Aymen Barkok in a 5–2 loss to Borussia Dortmund away at Westfalenstadion. On 21 August, he made his first start under manager Oliver Glasner in the 0–0 home draw against FC Augsburg. After mixed performances to start the season, he recorded a last-minute assist to Jens Petter Hauge in an important 2–1 group stage victory in the UEFA Europa League against Olympiacos on 2 November.

On 21 November, Lindstrøm scored his first goal for Eintracht Frankfurt in a 2–0 win over SC Freiburg, toe-poking the ball past Mark Flekken inside the area. He continued his strong performances in December, scoring in league appearances against Bayer Leverkusen, Borussia Mönchengladbach and Mainz 05 to earn him the award of Bundesliga Rookie of the Month.

In the second half of the 2021–22 season, he grew into an undisputed starter in attacking midfield next to Daichi Kamada and behind lone striker Rafael Borré. His performances earned him the award of Bundesliga Rookie of the Season. In the Europa League, Lindstrøm reached the final with Frankfurt after knocking out Real Betis, Barcelona and West Ham United. In the final on 18 May 2022 against Rangers, he featured in the starting eleven before being substituted for Hauge in the 70th minute, as Frankfurt won the title after a penalty shoot-out.

On 13 September 2022, he scored his first Champions League goal in a 1–0 away win against Marseille. This was also the first Champions League victory in the history of the club and the club's first goal scored in the tournament. He was sidelined with an ankle injury for several weeks in March 2023 after a collision in practice with teammate Hrvoje Smolčić. He returned to the pitch for the league game against Augsburg on 29 April, coming off the bench in the 82nd minute in a 1–1 draw.

Lindstrøm left the club after two seasons. During his time with the club he played a total of 80 games for Frankfurt scoring a total of 14 goals. 57 of these games were in the Bundesliga, five in the DFB-Pokal, and 18 in European competitions. He scored twelve goals in the domestic league and the above-mentioned two during the European games and the cup.

=== Napoli ===
On 29 August 2023, Serie A club Napoli agreed a deal to sign Lindstrøm from Frankfurt for a reported €30 million package, with the player agreeing a five-year deal. He later disclosed that his favourite club, Liverpool, had made an attempt to sign him. However, he chose Napoli because he believed he had a better opportunity for playing time there.

He made his debut for the club on 2 September, replacing Matteo Politano in the 75th minute of a 2–1 home loss to Lazio in the league.

==== Loans ====
On 26 July 2024, Lindstrøm signed for Everton on a season long loan with an option for a permanent transfer.

On 23 July 2025, Lindstrøm returned to Germany, joining Bundesliga club VfL Wolfsburg, on a one-year loan for the 2025–26 season for €1.5 million, with the option of a permanent transfer.

Lindstrøm was again loaned out during the 2026–27 season, joining Austrian club Red Bull Salzburg.

== International career ==
=== Youth career and early senior career ===
Lindstrøm won three caps for Denmark at under-19 level.

On 29 September 2020, Lindstrøm was named in manager Albert Capella's squad for the 2021 UEFA European Under-21 Championship qualifiers against Malta and Finland. He made his debut on 9 October, in a 3–1 win over Malta, scoring his first goal in the dying minutes of the game to secure the win. Lindstrøm was included in the 23-person squad for the 2021 European Under-21 Championship.

On 9 November 2020, Lindstrøm was called up to Kasper Hjulmand's senior squad for the friendly against Sweden due to several cancellations from, among others, the Danish national team players playing in England, due to the COVID-19 restrictions, as well as a case of COVID-19 in the squad, which had put several national team players in quarantine. He came on as a substitute in the second-half during the match against Sweden at Brøndby Stadium in his debut match, on 11 November 2020.

=== 2022 FIFA World Cup ===
On 7 November 2022, Lindstrøm was called up to the Denmark squad for the 2022 World Cup in Qatar. On 22 November 2022, he made his debut in a major tournament in Denmark's opening World Cup game against Tunisia, coming on as a replacement for Andreas Skov Olsen in the 65th minute of a 0–0 draw at Education City Stadium.

== Career statistics ==
=== Club ===
As of match played 25 October 2026

Appearances and goals by club, season and competition
Club	Season	League			National cup (Note: Includes Danish Cup, DFB-Pokal, Coppa Italia, FA Cup, Austrian Cup)		League cup (Note: Includes EFL Cup)		Europe		Other		Total	
Club	Season	Division	Apps	Goals	Apps	Goals	Apps	Goals	Apps	Goals	Apps	Goals	Apps	Goals
Brøndby	2018–19	Danish Superliga	0	0	1	0	—		0	0	—		1	0
Brøndby	2019–20	Danish Superliga	28	3	1	0	—		4 (Note: Appearances in UEFA Europa League)	2	—		33	5
Brøndby	2020–21	Danish Superliga	29	10	2	0	—		—		—		31	10
Brøndby	Total		57	13	4	0	—		4	2	—		65	15
Eintracht Frankfurt	2021–22	Bundesliga	29	5	1	0	—		9	0	—		39	5
Eintracht Frankfurt	2022–23	Bundesliga	27	7	3	1	—		7 (Note: Appearances in UEFA Champions League)	1	1 (Note: Appearance in UEFA Super Cup)	0	38	9
Eintracht Frankfurt	2023–24	Bundesliga	1	0	1	0	—		1 (Note: Appearance in UEFA Europa Conference League)	0	—		3	0
Eintracht Frankfurt	Total		57	12	5	1	—		17	1	1	0	80	14
Napoli	2023–24	Serie A	22	0	1	0	—		4	0	2 (Note: Appearances in Supercoppa Italiana)	0	29	0
Everton (loan)	2024–25	Premier League	25	0	2	0	2	0	—		—		29	0
VfL Wolfsburg (loan)	2025–26	Bundesliga	13	0	0	0	—		—		2 (Note: Appearances in Bundesliga relegation play-offs)	0	15	0
Red Bull Salzburg (loan)	2026–27	Austrian Bundesliga	4	1	2	0	—		2	1	—		8	2
Career total			178	26	14	0	2	0	27	4	5	0	226	31

=== International ===
As of match played 23 March 2025

Appearances and goals by national team and year
National team	Year	Apps	Goals
Denmark	2020	1	0
Denmark	2021	2	0
Denmark	2022	6	1
Denmark	2023	7	0
Denmark	2024	0	0
Denmark	2025	2	0
Total		18	1

Scores and results list Denmark's goal tally first, score column indicates score after each Lindstrøm goal.

List of international goals scored by Jesper Lindstrøm
No.	Date	Venue	Opponent	Score	Result	Competition
1	29 March 2022	Parken Stadium, Copenhagen, Denmark	Serbia	2–0	3–0	Friendly

== Honours ==
Brøndby

- Danish Superliga: 2020–21

Eintracht Frankfurt

- UEFA Europa League: 2021–22

Individual

- Superliga Young Player of the Month: September 2020, October 2020, November 2020
- Superliga Player of the Month: November 2020
- Brøndby Player of the Month: September 2020, October 2020, November 2020
- Tipsbladet Player of the Fall: 2020
- Bundesliga Rookie of the Month: December 2021
- Bundesliga Rookie of the Season: 2021–22
