= Sam Lammers =

Dutch footballer (born 1997)

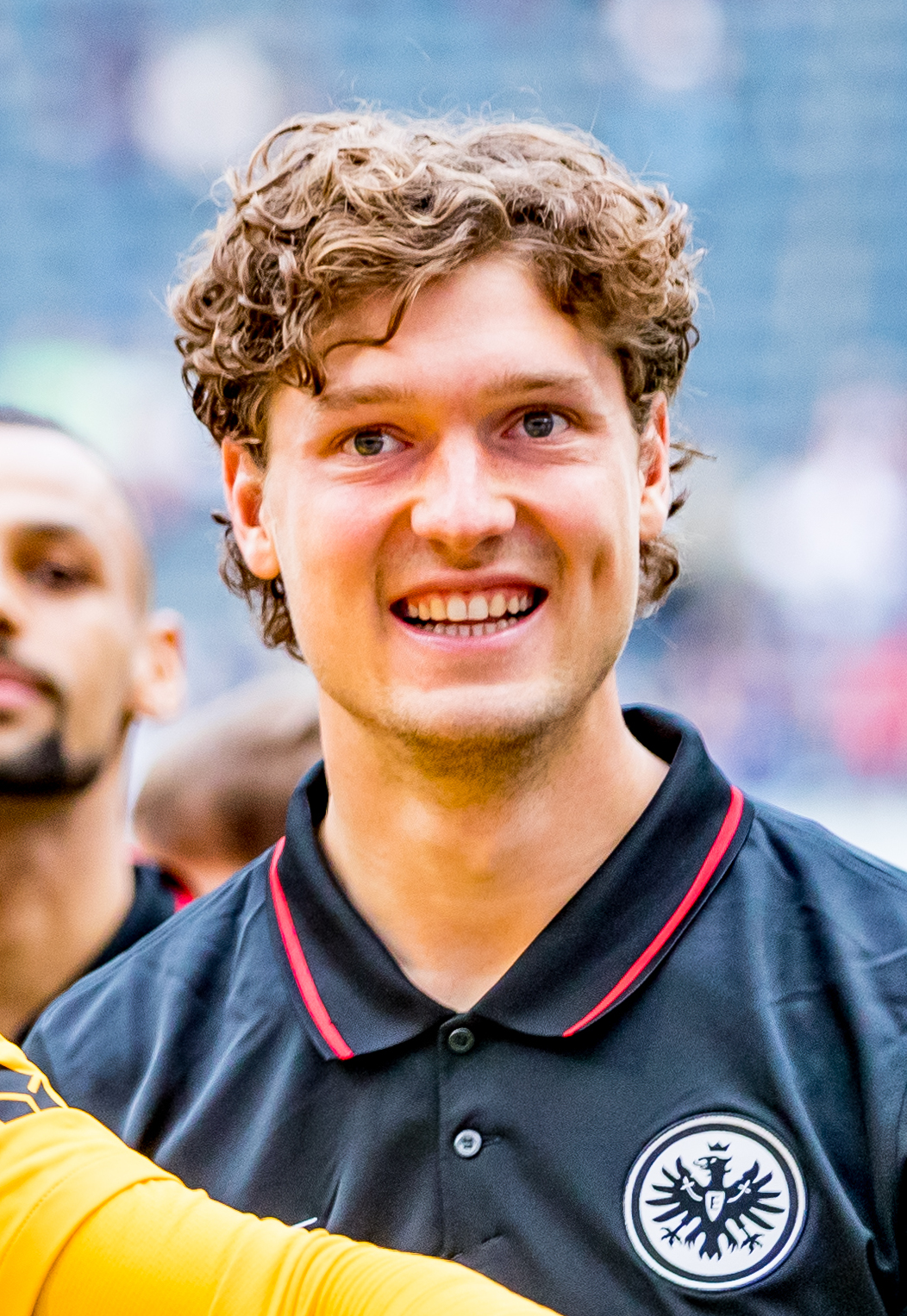
- Lammers with Eintracht Frankfurt in 2022

Personal information
- Full name: Sam Adrianus Martinus Lammers
- Date of birth: 30 April 1997 (age 29)
- Place of birth: Tilburg, Netherlands
- Height: 1.91 m (6 ft 3 in)
- Position: Forward

Team information
- Current team: PSV
- Number: 29

Youth career
- VOAB
- –2010: Willem II
- 2010–2015: PSV

Senior career*
Years	Team	Apps	(Gls)
2015–2018	Jong PSV	63	(30)
2016–2020	PSV	20	(4)
2018–2019	→ Heerenveen (loan)	31	(16)
2020–2023	Atalanta	17	(2)
2021–2022	→ Eintracht Frankfurt (loan)	15	(1)
2022–2023	→ Empoli (loan)	14	(1)
2023	→ Sampdoria (loan)	19	(1)
2023–2024	Rangers	17	(2)
2024	→ Utrecht (loan)	18	(10)
2024–2026	Twente	48	(13)
2026–	PSV	0	(0)

International career
2015–2016	Netherlands U19	14	(10)
2016	Netherlands U20	4	(0)
2017–2018	Netherlands U21	11	(3)
- * Club domestic league appearances and goals as of 16 August 2026

Sam Adrianus Martinus Lammers (born 30 April 1997) is a Dutch professional footballer who plays as a forward for Eredivisie club PSV Eindhoven.

Lammers has previously played for several clubs in the Netherlands, Italy and Germany, including PSV Eindhoven, Atalanta, and Eintracht Frankfurt.

== Club career ==
=== PSV Eindhoven ===
Lammers joined PSV Eindhoven's youth system in 2010, having previously played youth football for VOAB and Willem II. He signed a three-year professional contract with PSV in July 2015. Lammers made his debut in professional football on 10 August 2015, when he faced Go Ahead Eagles with Jong PSV. On 8 August 2016, he scored a hat-trick in Jong PSV's 5–4 win against Den Bosch.

Lammers made his first-team debut for PSV on 21 September 2016, in a KNVB Cup match against Roda.

He was loaned out to Heerenveen for the 2018–19 season.

=== Atalanta ===
In September 2020, Lammers joined Serie A club Atalanta. The transfer fee paid to PSV was reported as €9 million plus €2 million in possible bonuses. On 4 October, he scored his first goal in a 5–2 win against Cagliari.

In September 2021, Lammers joined Eintracht Frankfurt on loan for a season, without option to buy, to replace André Silva who left Eintracht for RB Leipzig. Lammers was an unused substitute in the 2022 UEFA Europa League final against future employer Rangers.

On 7 August 2022, Lammers joined Serie A club Empoli on a season-long loan. In January 2023, this loan was terminated and Lammers joined Sampdoria on loan until the end of the season.

=== Rangers ===
On 15 June 2023, Lammers joined Scottish Premiership side Rangers for an undisclosed fee. He made his debut for the club on 5 August 2023, starting in a 1–0 defeat away to Kilmarnock. He scored his first goal for Rangers during a league match at home to Livingston on 12 August 2023. Lammers scored against Dundee in an away match in November 2023.

On 10 January 2024, Lammers joined Eredivisie club Utrecht on loan until the end of the season. Lammers scored his first goal for Utrecht in a five nil win over Sittard. Following this Lammers went on an unprecedented run of form by scoring in seven consecutive matches for Utrecht which is a club record in the Eredivisie. During this goal scoring run this included a double in an away match against Heerenveen. Lammers finished his loan spell at Utrecht with further goals against Alkmaar and Rotterdam taking his total for the loan spell to eleven goals in twenty matches for the Dutch side.

=== Twente ===
On 26 July 2024, Lammers joined Twente on a three-year contract.

=== Return to PSV Eindhoven ===
On 2 September 2026, Lammers returned to PSV Eindhoven on a two-year contract.

== International career ==
Lammers played youth international football for the Netherlands at under-19, under-20 and under-21 levels.

== Career statistics ==
As of match played 20 August 2026

Appearances and goals by club, season and competition
Club	Season	League			National cup (Note: Includes KNVB Cup, Coppa Italia)		League cup		Europe		Other		Total	
Club	Season	Division	Apps	Goals	Apps	Goals	Apps	Goals	Apps	Goals	Apps	Goals	Apps	Goals
PSV II	2015–16	Eerste Divisie	16	2	—		—		—		—		16	2
PSV II	2016–17	Eerste Divisie	31	17	—		—		—		—		31	17
PSV II	2017–18	Eerste Divisie	16	11	—		—		—		—		16	11
PSV II	Total		63	30	—		—		—		—		63	30
PSV Eindhoven	2016–17	Eredivisie	5	2	2	0	—		—		—		7	2
PSV Eindhoven	2017–18	Eredivisie	7	0	3	1	—		1 (Note: Appearance(s) in UEFA Europa League)	0	—		11	1
PSV Eindhoven	2019–20	Eredivisie	7	2	1	0	—		1 (Note: Appearance(s) in UEFA Champions League)	1	1 (Note: Appearance in Johan Cruyff Shield)	0	10	3
PSV Eindhoven	2020–21	Eredivisie	1	0	—		—		—		—		1	0
PSV Eindhoven	Total		20	4	6	1	—		2	1	1	0	29	6
Heerenveen (loan)	2018–19	Eredivisie	31	16	4	3	—		—		—		35	19
Atalanta	2020–21	Serie A	15	2	1	0	—		1	0	—		17	2
Atalanta	2021–22	Serie A	2	0	0	0	—		0	0	—		2	0
Atalanta	Total		17	2	1	0	—		1	0	—		19	2
Eintracht Frankfurt (loan)	2021–22	Bundesliga	15	1	0	0	—		7	1	—		22	2
Empoli (loan)	2022–23	Serie A	14	1	0	0	—		—		—		14	1
Sampdoria (loan)	2022–23	Serie A	19	1	1	0	—		—		—		20	1
Rangers	2023–24	Scottish Premiership	17	2	0	0	4	0	10 (Note: Four appearances in UEFA Champions League, six appearances in UEFA Europa League)	0	—		31	2
Utrecht (loan)	2023–24	Eredivisie	18	10	—		—		—		2 (Note: Appearances in Eredivisie European play-offs)	1	20	11
Twente	2024–25	Eredivisie	21	7	1	0	—		9 (Note: Two appearances in UEFA Champions League, seven appearances and two goals in UEFA Europa League)	2	—		31	9
Twente	2025–26	Eredivisie	24	6	4	1	—		—		—		28	6
Twente	2026–27	Eredivisie	2	0	0	0	—		2 (Note: One appearance in UEFA Europa League, one appearance in UEFA Conference League)	0	—		4	0
Twente	Total		47	13	5	1	—		11	2	3	1	65	17
Career total			261	80	17	5	4	0	31	4	3	1	316	89

== Honours ==
PSV

- Eredivisie: 2017–18

Eintracht Frankfurt

- UEFA Europa League: 2021–22

Rangers

- Scottish League Cup: 2023–24

Individual

- UEFA European Under-19 Championship Team of the Tournament: 2016
- Eredivisie Talent of the Month: January 2019
- Eredivisie Player of the Month: April 2024
- Eredivisie Team of the Month: August 2024
