= Christopher Lenz =

German footballer (born 1994)

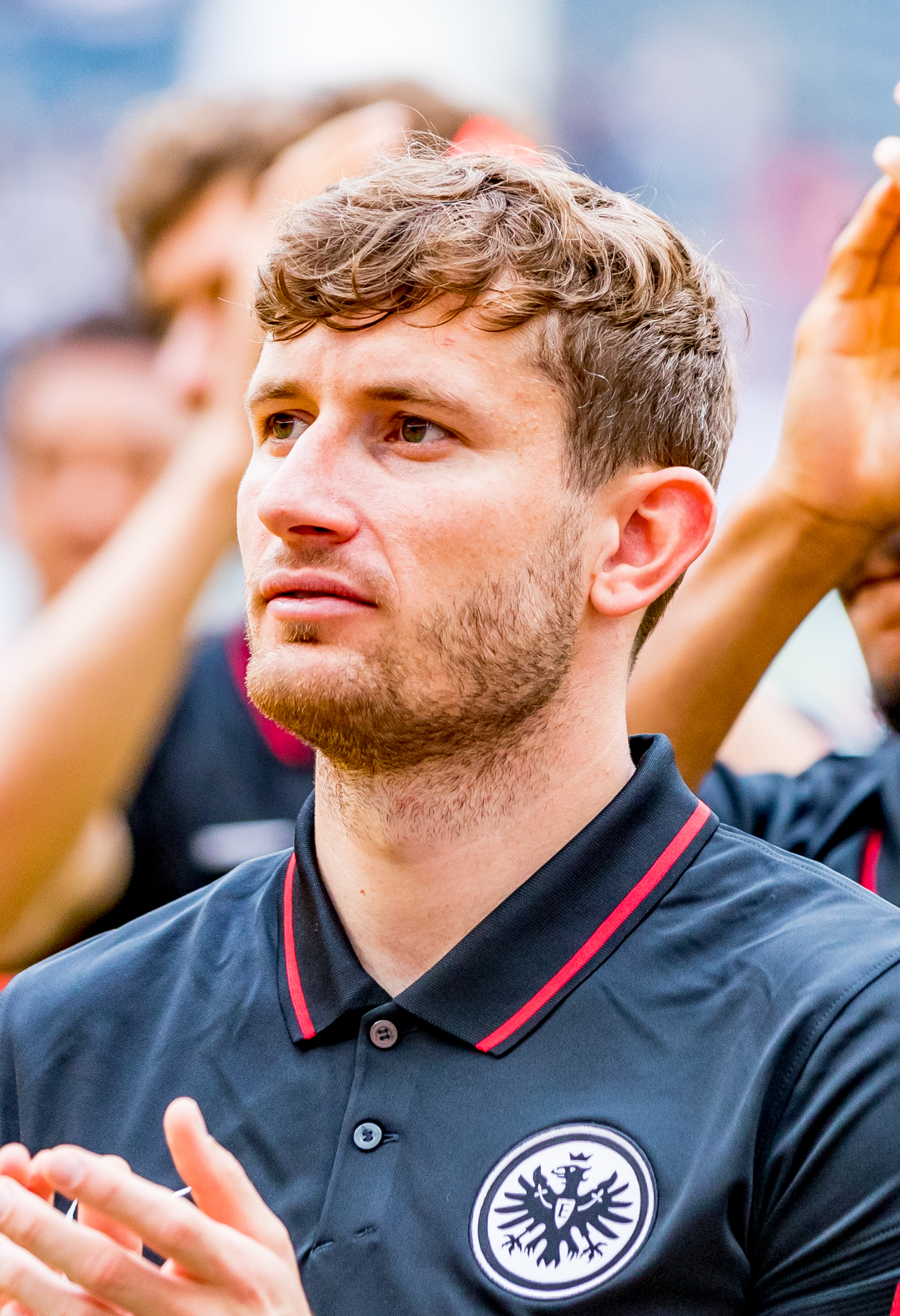
- Lenz with Eintracht Frankfurt in 2022

Personal information
- Date of birth: 22 September 1994 (age 32)
- Place of birth: Berlin, Germany
- Height: 1.81 m (5 ft 11 in)
- Position: Left-back

Youth career
- Stern Marienfelde
- –2008: Tennis Borussia Berlin
- 2008–2012: Hertha BSC

Senior career*
| Years | Team | Apps | (Gls) |
| 2012 | Hertha BSC II | 4 | (0) |
| 2012–2016 | Borussia Mönchengladbach II | 109 | (8) |
| 2016–2021 | Union Berlin | 65 | (0) |
| 2017–2018 | → Holstein Kiel (loan) | 30 | (2) |
| 2021–2023 | Eintracht Frankfurt | 40 | (0) |
| 2023–2024 | RB Leipzig | 5 | (0) |
| 2024–2025 | TSG Hoffenheim | 0 | (0) |
| 2024–2025 | TSG Hoffenheim II | 2 | (0) |
| 2025–2026 | Fortuna Düsseldorf | 17 | (0) |

International career
| 2012 | Germany U18 | 2 | (0) |
| 2012–2013 | Germany U19 | 10 | (0) |
- * Club domestic league appearances and goals as of 18 May 2026

Christopher Lenz (born 22 September 1994) is a German professional footballer who plays as a left-back.

== Club career ==
Born and raised in Berlin, Lenz started playing football at FC Stern Marienfelde in the southern part of the capital. In addition to a brief period in the youth department of Tennis Borussia Berlin, Lenz was primarily developed at Hertha BSC, where he spent a total of twelve years. In the second half of the 2011–12 season, he was promoted to the second team's squad.

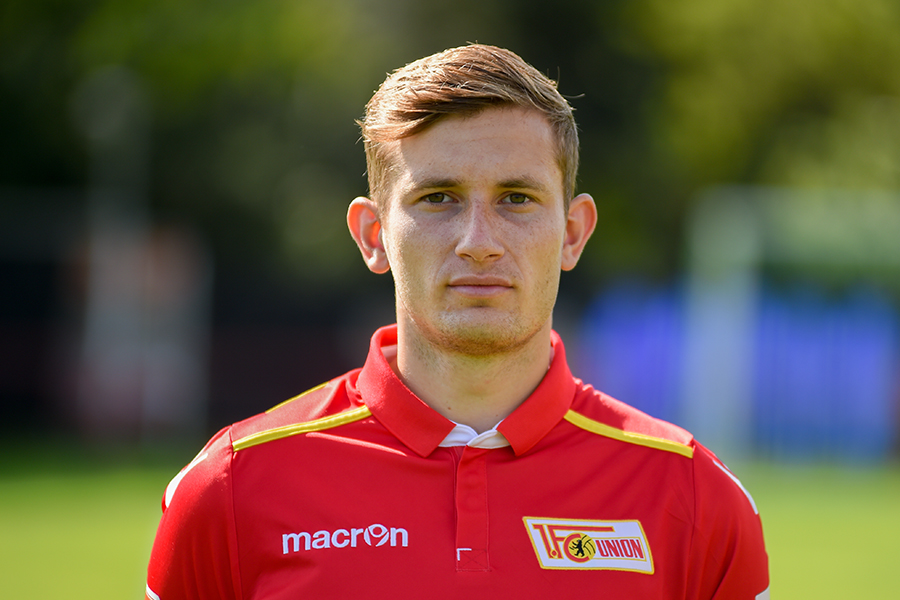
Christopher Lenz in the Union Berlin jersey. (2016)

In 2012, he transferred to Borussia Mönchengladbach, where he initially played for the A-youth team but was already promoted to the second team in September. After a total of four years in the Regionalliga West and upon the expiration of his contract, Lenz returned to his hometown for the 2016-17 season and signed a two-year contract with 2. Bundesliga club Union Berlin. After being called up to the squad for league matches only twice and coming on as a substitute once during the first half of the season, he moved on loan to 3. Liga club Holstein Kiel for the second half of the season. After playing the upcoming second-division season with Kiel, Lenz returned to Union Berlin's squad for the 2018–19 season. Following Berlin's first-ever promotion to the Bundesliga, he made his debut in the league on Matchday 1 in the 0–4 home defeat against RB Leipzig.

For the 2021–22 season, after his contract with Union expired, Lenz made a free transfer within the Bundesliga to Eintracht Frankfurt In the Main metropolis, he signed a contract until 2024. Initially deployed as a left-back in Frankfurt's back four, Lenz had to take a break from September 2021 for over two months due to injury. Upon his return, especially with a shift to a back three system and the presence of Filip Kostić as a key player on the left flank, he mainly served as a substitute. Throughout the season, he made 18 appearances in various competitions. Lenz gained his first international experience in the Europa League, and his team reached the final after topping the group and securing victories in the knockout stages against Real Betis, FC Barcelona, and West Ham United. In the final, on 18 May 2022 against the Rangers, the defender came on as a substitute in extra time and played a direct role in his team's title win by converting the first penalty in the subsequent shootout.

In the 2022–23 season, he gained experience in the Champions League for the first time and made a total of 35 appearances across different competitions.

On 30 August 2023, Lenz signed with RB Leipzig for one year, with an option for a second year. He left RB Leipzig on 1 July 2024.

On 12 September 2024, Lenz joined TSG Hoffenheim. Due to persistent injuries, he only appeared for the reserve team in Hoffenheim.

On 29 May 2025, Lenz moved to Fortuna Düsseldorf in 2. Bundesliga.

=== International career ===
Lenz played two test matches for the Germany U18 national team in May 2012. Additionally, from August 2012 to June 2013, he was also featured in ten international matches for the U19 national team.

== Career statistics ==
As of match played 11 May 2024

Appearances and goals by club, season and competition
| Club | Season | League | | | DFB-Pokal | | Europe | | Other | | Total | |
| Club | Season | Division | Apps | Goals | Apps | Goals | Apps | Goals | Apps | Goals | Apps | Goals |
|---|---|---|---|---|---|---|---|---|---|---|---|---|
| Borussia Mönchengladbach II | 2012–13 | Regionalliga West | 18 | 0 | — | | — | | — | | 18 | 0 |
| Borussia Mönchengladbach II | 2013–14 | Regionalliga West | 29 | 4 | — | | — | | — | | 29 | 4 |
| Borussia Mönchengladbach II | 2014–15 | Regionalliga West | 31 | 3 | — | | — | | 2 (Note: Appearances in Regionalliga promotion play-offs) | 0 | 33 | 3 |
| Borussia Mönchengladbach II | 2015–16 | Regionalliga West | 31 | 1 | — | | — | | — | | 31 | 1 |
| Borussia Mönchengladbach II | Total | | 109 | 8 | — | | — | | 2 | 0 | 111 | 8 |
| Union Berlin | 2016–17 | 2. Bundesliga | 1 | 0 | — | | — | | — | | 1 | 0 |
| Union Berlin | 2018–19 | 2. Bundesliga | 11 | 0 | 2 | 0 | — | | — | | 13 | 0 |
| Union Berlin | 2019–20 | Bundesliga | 26 | 0 | 4 | 1 | — | | — | | 30 | 1 |
| Union Berlin | 2020–21 | Bundesliga | 27 | 0 | 1 | 0 | — | | — | | 28 | 0 |
| Union Berlin | Total | | 65 | 0 | 7 | 1 | — | | — | | 72 | 1 |
| Holstein Kiel (loan) | 2016–17 | 3. Liga | 19 | 2 | 2 | 0 | — | | — | | 21 | 2 |
| Holstein Kiel (loan) | 2017–18 | 2. Bundesliga | 11 | 0 | 1 | 0 | — | | — | | 12 | 0 |
| Holstein Kiel (loan) | Total | | 30 | 2 | 3 | 0 | — | | — | | 33 | 2 |
| Eintracht Frankfurt | 2021–22 | Bundesliga | 15 | 0 | 1 | 0 | 2 (Note: Appearances in UEFA Europa League) | 0 | — | | 18 | 0 |
| Eintracht Frankfurt | 2022–23 | Bundesliga | 24 | 0 | 4 | 0 | 5 (Note: Appearances in UEFA Champions League) | 0 | 1 (Note: Appearance in UEFA Super Cup) | 0 | 34 | 0 |
| Eintracht Frankfurt | 2023–24 | Bundesliga | 1 | 0 | 0 | 0 | 0 | 0 | — | | 1 | 0 |
| Eintracht Frankfurt | Total | | 40 | 0 | 5 | 0 | 7 | 0 | 1 | 0 | 53 | 0 |
| RB Leipzig | 2023–24 | Bundesliga | 5 | 0 | 1 | 0 | 2 | 0 | — | | 8 | 0 |
| Career total | | | 249 | 10 | 16 | 1 | 9 | 0 | 3 | 0 | 277 | 11 |

== Honours ==
Eintracht Frankfurt

- UEFA Europa League: 2021–22
- UEFA Super Cup runner-up: 2022
- DFB-Pokal runner-up: 2022–23
