= Jens Grahl =

German footballer (born 1988)

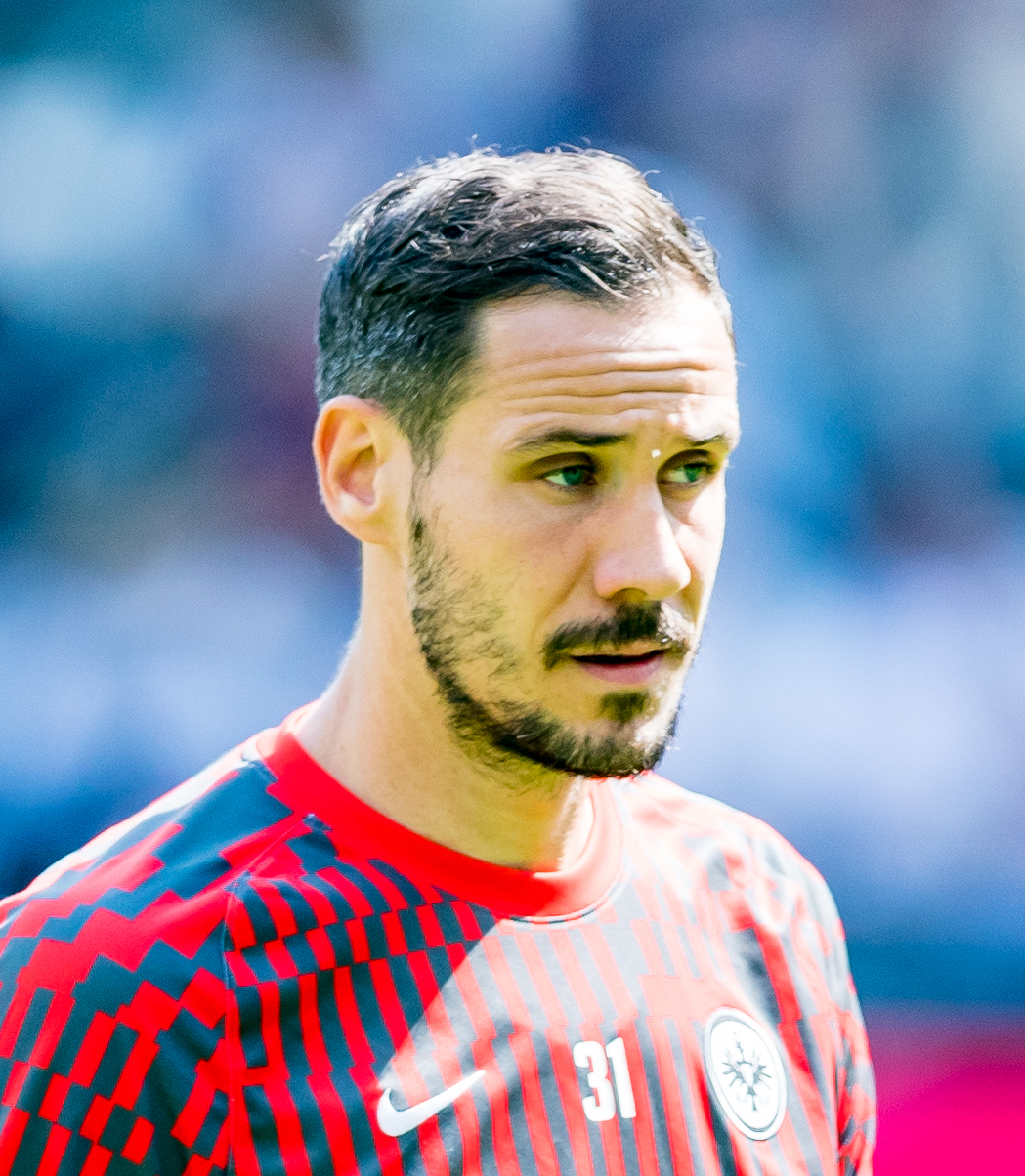
- Grahl warming up for Eintracht Frankfurt in 2022

Personal information
- Date of birth: 22 September 1988 (age 38)
- Place of birth: Stuttgart, West Germany
- Height: 1.92 m (6 ft 4 in)
- Position: Goalkeeper

Team information
- Current team: Eintracht Frankfurt
- Number: 33

Youth career
- TSV Münster
- SpVgg Feuerbach
- VfB Stuttgart
- –2006: Stuttgarter Kickers
- 2006–2007: SpVgg Greuther Fürth

Senior career*
Years	Team	Apps	(Gls)
2006–2009	SpVgg Greuther Fürth II	72	(0)
2007–2009	SpVgg Greuther Fürth	0	(0)
2009–2016	TSG Hoffenheim	12	(0)
2009–2016	TSG Hoffenheim II	77	(0)
2011–2012	→ SC Paderborn 07 (loan)	0	(0)
2016–2021	VfB Stuttgart	0	(0)
2021–	Eintracht Frankfurt	3	(0)
- * Club domestic league appearances and goals as of 21 May 2024

Jens Grahl (born 22 September 1988) is a German footballer who plays as a goalkeeper for Bundesliga club Eintracht Frankfurt.

Born in Stuttgart, Grahl has spent his entire career in Germany, including with local team VfB Stuttgart.

== Club career ==
Grahl joined 1899 Hoffenheim in 2009 from SpVgg Greuther Fürth. He made 29 appearances for SpVgg Greuther Fürth during his time with the club. During the 2011–12 season, he was announced at SC Paderborn 07 on a loan deal, fighting for a place with Lukas Kruse and Nico Burchert. He noted that he was "fascinated" with the performances of Gianluigi Buffon and had learnt a lot from fellow Paderborn goalkeepers Tom Starke and Stephan Loboué. Grahl suffered a torn medial meniscus during his time with the club and was out for an extended period of time.

He made his Bundesliga debut with 1899 Hoffenheim on 7 December 2013 against Eintracht Frankfurt in a 1–2 away win.

On 30 June 2016, Grahl was announced at VfB Stuttgart on a two-year contract, as a replacement for Przemysław Tytoń. On 14 May 2018, he extended his contract with Stuttgart until June 2020.

On 19 July 2021, Grahl signed a three-year contract with Eintracht Frankfurt. He made his league debut for the club against 1. FC Union Berlin. On 2 February 2023, Grahl extended his contract with the club until 2026, and as part of the contract agreement, will stay with Eintracht Frankfurt as a goalkeeping coach after he retires.

He made his European debut in the UEFA Conference League against HJK Helsinki on 26 October 2023, keeping a clean sheet.

== Career statistics ==
As of match played 17 August 2025

Appearances and goals by club, season and competition
Club	Season	League			Cup		Europe		Other		Total	
Club	Season	Division	Apps	Goals	Apps	Goals	Apps	Goals	Apps	Goals	Apps	Goals
SpVgg Greuther Fürth II	2006–07	Bayernliga	12	0	—		—		—		12	0
SpVgg Greuther Fürth II	2007–08	Bayernliga	31	0	—		—		—		31	0
SpVgg Greuther Fürth II	2008–09	Regionalliga Süd	29	0	—		—		—		29	0
SpVgg Greuther Fürth II	Total		72	0	—		—		—		72	0
SpVgg Greuther Fürth	2007–08	2. Bundesliga	0	0	0	0	—		—		0	0
TSG Hoffenheim	2009–10	Bundesliga	0	0	0	0	—		—		0	0
TSG Hoffenheim	2010–11	Bundesliga	0	0	0	0	—		—		0	0
TSG Hoffenheim	2012–13	Bundesliga	0	0	0	0	—		0	0	0	0
TSG Hoffenheim	2013–14	Bundesliga	11	0	2	0	—		—		13	0
TSG Hoffenheim	2014–15	Bundesliga	0	0	2	0	—		—		2	0
TSG Hoffenheim	2015–16	Bundesliga	1	0	0	0	—		—		1	0
TSG Hoffenheim	Total		12	0	4	0	—		0	0	16	0
TSG Hoffenheim II	2009–10	Regionalliga Südwest	27	0	—		—		—		27	0
TSG Hoffenheim II	2010–11	Regionalliga Südwest	26	0	—		—		—		26	0
TSG Hoffenheim II	2012–13	Regionalliga Südwest	13	0	—		—		—		13	0
TSG Hoffenheim II	2013–14	Regionalliga Südwest	5	0	—		—		—		5	0
TSG Hoffenheim II	2014–15	Regionalliga Südwest	3	0	—		—		—		3	0
TSG Hoffenheim II	2015–16	Regionalliga Südwest	4	0	—		—		—		4	0
TSG Hoffenheim II	Total		77	0	—		—		—		77	0
SC Paderborn 07 (loan)	2011–12	Bundesliga	0	0	1	0	—		—		1	0
VfB Stuttgart	2016–17	2. Bundesliga	0	0	0	0	—		—		0	0
VfB Stuttgart	2017–18	Bundesliga	0	0	0	0	—		—		0	0
VfB Stuttgart	2018–19	Bundesliga	0	0	0	0	—		0	0	0	0
VfB Stuttgart	2019–20	2. Bundesliga	0	0	0	0	—		—		0	0
VfB Stuttgart	2020–21	Bundesliga	0	0	0	0	—		—		0	0
VfB Stuttgart	Total		0	0	0	0	—		0	0	0	0
Eintracht Frankfurt	2021–22	Bundesliga	1	0	0	0	0	0	—		1	0
Eintracht Frankfurt	2022–23	Bundesliga	0	0	0	0	0	0	0	0	0	0
Eintracht Frankfurt	2023–24	Bundesliga	2	0	1	0	2	0	—		5	0
Eintracht Frankfurt	2024–25	Bundesliga	0	0	0	0	0	0	—		0	0
Eintracht Frankfurt	2025–26	Bundesliga	0	0	1	0	0	0	—		1	0
Eintracht Frankfurt	Total		3	0	2	0	2	0	0	0	7	0
Career total			164	0	7	0	2	0	0	0	173	0

== Honours ==
Eintracht Frankfurt

- UEFA Europa League: 2021–22
