= Rafael Santos Borré =

Colombian footballer (born 1995)

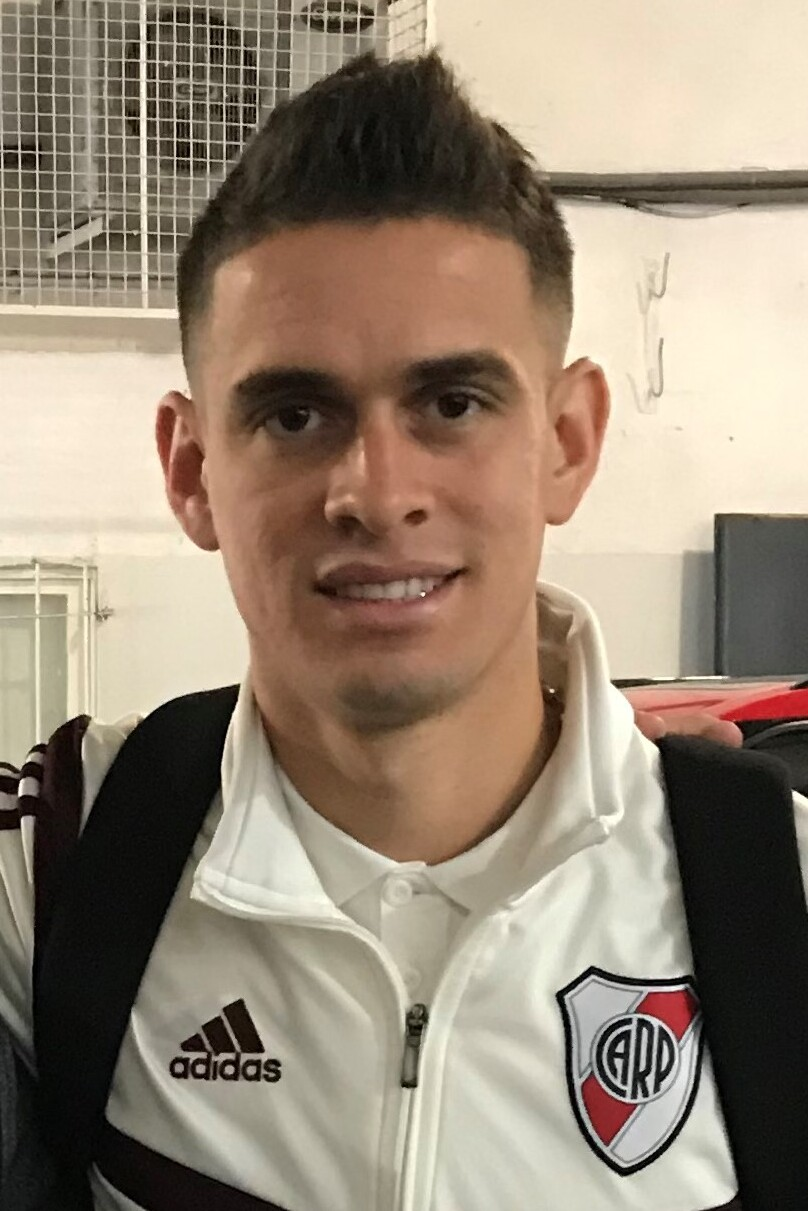
- Borré with River Plate in 2019

Personal information
- Full name: Rafael Santos Borré Maury
- Date of birth: 15 September 1995 (age 31)
- Place of birth: Barranquilla, Colombia
- Height: 1.74 m (5 ft 9 in)
- Position: Forward

Team information
- Current team: River Plate
- Number: 19

Senior career*
Years	Team	Apps	(Gls)
2013–2015	Deportivo Cali	26	(14)
2015–2017	Atlético Madrid	0	(0)
2015–2016	→ Deportivo Cali (loan)	20	(6)
2016–2017	→ Villarreal (loan)	17	(2)
2017–2021	River Plate	83	(32)
2021–2024	Eintracht Frankfurt	63	(10)
2023–2024	→ Werder Bremen (loan)	19	(4)
2024–2026	Internacional	87	(23)
2026–	River Plate	10	(0)

International career^{‡}
2014–2015	Colombia U20	15	(4)
2016	Colombia Olympic	1	(0)
2019–	Colombia	44	(6)
Medal record
Representing Colombia
Men's football
Copa América
Runner-up	2024 United States
Third place	2021 Brazil
- * Club domestic league appearances and goals as of 31 May 2026 ‡ National team caps and goals as of 18 November 2025

Rafael Santos Borré Maury (born 15 September 1995) is a Colombian professional footballer who plays as a forward for Argentine Primera División club River Plate and the Colombia national team.

Succeeding his early career with Deportivo Cali, Borré signed with Spanish club Atlético Madrid in 2015, where he was loaned back to Cali until 2016; that same year, Borré was loaned out to La Liga counterpart Villarreal. In 2017, Borré joined Argentine giant River Plate and won several titles during his time with the club, including the 2018 Copa Libertadores and the 2019 Recopa Sudamericana. Before his departure from the club, Borré consolidated himself as River Plate's top scorer of the renowned Marcelo Gallardo era with 55 goals. He returned to European football in 2021, signing for Bundesliga club Eintracht Frankfurt. He helped the side conquer their second Europa League title in 2022, also scoring Eintracht's equalizer and winning penalty in the final against Rangers; for his contributions, Borré was named in the 2021–22 UEFA Europa League Team of the Year.

At youth level, Borré represented Colombia at the South American U-20 Championship and the FIFA U-20 World Cup in 2015. He made his senior debut in 2019 and has since collected over forty caps; Borré was part of the Colombia squad that finished third at the 2021 Copa América.

== Club career ==
=== Deportivo Cali ===
Borré began his career with Deportivo Cali, and earned himself a name as a prolific goalscorer, which garnered the attention of some of Europe's biggest clubs. In August 2015, Borré was seen in the training grounds of Atlético Madrid. He signed for them on 28 August 2015, penning a six-year deal. However, he went back on loan to Deportivo Cali. On 25 March 2016, Borré suffered an injury. He did not play until 1 May, coming on as a 64-minute substitute for Andrés Felipe Roa in a 3–2 win against Alianza Petrolera. Borré played his next match on 15 May against Jaguares de Córdoba. There he scored his team's second goal in a 3–2 win.

==== Loan to Villarreal ====
On 13 August 2016, Borré joined Spanish club Villarreal on loan from Atlético Madrid. On 23 February 2017, he scored his first goal for the club in a 1–0 win over Roma in the Europa League round of 32. Despite winning the match, Villarreal still lost the series by a 4–1 aggregate. On 1 March, he scored a brace in a 4–1 win over Osasuna, scoring twice in under 5 minutes.

=== River Plate ===
On 7 August 2017, Borré joined River Plate. On 23 November 2019, he scored River Plate's only goal in a 2–1 defeat to Flamengo in the Copa Libertadores final.

For the 2020 Argentine season, Borré was the league's top scorer with 12 goals in 20 league matches and has cemented himself as a star for Gallardo due to his goalscoring and work rate. In April 2021, Borre scored a poker, scoring four goals in one match in the league. He is the maximum goal scorer in the legendary Gallardo era with 54 goals and 20 assists as of 18 April.

On 1 July 2021, Santos Borré became a free agent.

=== Eintracht Frankfurt ===
On 5 July 2021, Santos Borré joined German club Eintracht Frankfurt. On 5 May 2022, he scored the winning goal in a 1–0 win over West Ham United in the second leg of the semi-finals of the Europa League, which helped his club to reach the final. In the final, Borré scored Eintracht's equalizer against Rangers, and the winning penalty (5–4) to win the competition for his team.

==== Loan to Werder Bremen ====
On 1 September 2023, the last day of the 2023 summer transfer window, Santos Borré joined Frankfurt's league rivals Werder Bremen on loan for the 2023–24 season.

=== Internacional ===
On 17 January 2024, Brazilian Série A club Internacional announced that an agreement had been reached with Eintracht Frankfurt for the signing of Santos Borré on a contract until December 2028. The date in which the transfer would happen was not specified, but revealed to be prior to 10 July 2024. The transfer fee involved was reported to be around €5.5 million.

=== Return to River Plate ===
On 4 July 2026, River Plate announced the return of Borré to the club on a contract until 2029.

== International career ==
=== Youth ===
Borré had his first stint in international football with Colombia's U-20 team which participated at the 2014 Toulon Tournament, where he scored a goal against Qatar during Colombia's third group-stage match which ended in a 1–1 draw. Finally, Colombia were eliminated after finishing fourth in their group with Borré appearing in the entirety of Colombia's matches.

Borré was called up to Colombia's under-20 team to take part in the 2015 South American Youth Championship, where he scored two goals during the initial stage against Chile and Peru, respectively. Colombia finished as the tournament's runner-up, thus earning a spot at the 2015 FIFA U-20 World Cup in New Zealand.

At the U-20 World Cup, Borré managed to score a goal during Colombia's final group-stage match against Portugal; Colombia was eliminated in the round of 16 after losing 1–0 to the United States.

In March 2016, Borré was called up to Colombia's Olympic team to dispute the first-leg of the CONMEBOL–CONCACAF play-off against the United States for a spot at the 2016 Summer Olympics; Borré was substituted on in the 61st minute with the game ending 1–1 in Barranquilla. Despite Borré not being included in the second leg, Colombia secured qualification after winning 3–2 on aggregate.

=== Senior ===
On 20 March 2015, Borré received his first call-up to Colombia's senior team by coach José Pékerman for friendlies against Bahrain and Kuwait. However, he was an unused substitute in both matches.

He made his Colombia debut on 6 September 2019 in a friendly against Brazil, when he substituted Duván Zapata in the 83rd minute.

On 10 June 2021, Borré was named in Colombia manager Reinaldo Rueda's list for the 2021 Copa América. In total, Borré appeared in five matches as his country secured a third-place finish.

On 5 June 2022, Borré scored his first goal for Colombia during a 1–0 friendly win over Saudi Arabia. He netted another goal for his country on 24 September, Colombia's third in a 4–1 triumph against Guatemala.

On 7 September 2023 he scored the first goal of the 2026 FIFA World Cup qualification during a 1–0 win against Venezuela as his sixth international goal for the senior Colombia team.

== Career statistics ==
=== Club ===
As of match played 17 July 2026

Appearances and goals by club, season and competition
Club	Season	League			National cup (Note: Includes Copa Colombia, Copa del Rey, Copa Argentina, DFB-Pokal, Copa do Brasil)		Continental		Other		Total	
Club	Season	Division	Apps	Goals	Apps	Goals	Apps	Goals	Apps	Goals	Apps	Goals
Deportivo Cali	2013	Categoría Primera A	2	0	0	0	—		—		2	0
Deportivo Cali	2014	Categoría Primera A	7	3	6	1	0	0	0	0	13	4
Deportivo Cali	2015	Categoría Primera A	17	11	5	5	—		—		22	16
Deportivo Cali	Total		26	14	11	6	0	0	0	0	37	20
Atlético Madrid	2015–16	La Liga	—		—		—		—		—	
Deportivo Cali (loan)	2015	Categoría Primera A	9	0	0	0	—		—		9	0
Deportivo Cali (loan)	2016	Categoría Primera A	11	6	0	0	3 (Note: Appearances in Copa Libertadores)	0	2 (Note: Appearances in Superliga Colombiana)	0	16	6
Deportivo Cali (loan)	Total		20	6	0	0	3	0	2	0	25	6
Villarreal (loan)	2016–17	La Liga	17	2	4	0	9 (Note: Two appearances in UEFA Champions League, seven appearances and two goals in UEFA Europa League)	2	—		30	4
River Plate	2017–18	Argentine Primera División	23	6	6	2	6	0	0	0	35	8
River Plate	2018–19	Argentine Primera División	19	4	6	3	11	3	8 (Note: Two appearances and three goals in FIFA Club World Cup, four appearances and one goal in Copa de la Superliga, two appearances in Recopa Sudamericana)	4	44	14
River Plate	2019–20	Argentine Primera División	20	12	5	1	7	4	0	0	32	17
River Plate	2020–21	Argentine Primera División	8	2	0	0	10	6	0	0	18	8
River Plate	2021	Argentine Primera División	13	8	2	0	4	0	1 (Note: Appearance in Supercopa Argentina)	1	26	9
River Plate	Total		83	32	19	6	38	13	9	5	149	56
Eintracht Frankfurt	2021–22	Bundesliga	31	8	1	0	13 (Note: Appearances in UEFA Europa League)	4	—		45	12
Eintracht Frankfurt	2022–23	Bundesliga	32	2	6	1	8 (Note: Appearances in UEFA Champions League)	0	1 (Note: Appearance in UEFA Super Cup)	0	47	3
Eintracht Frankfurt	Total		63	10	7	1	21	4	1	0	92	15
Werder Bremen (loan)	2023–24	Bundesliga	19	4	0	0	—		—		19	4
Internacional	2024	Série A	23	9	1	0	5 (Note: Appearances in Copa Sudamericana)	2	—		29	11
Internacional	2025	Série A	30	5	2	0	6	1	9 (Note: Appearances in Campeonato Gaúcho)	2	47	8
Internacional	2026	Série A	18	2	2	1	—		8 (Note: Seven appearances and five goals in Campeonato Gaúcho, one appearance and one goal in Recopa Gaúcha)	6	28	9
Internacional	Total		71	16	5	1	11	3	17	8	104	28
River Plate	2026	Argentine Primera División	0	0	1	1	0	0	—		1	1
Career total			299	84	47	15	82	22	29	13	457	134

=== International ===
As of match played 18 November 2025

Appearances and goals by national team and year
National team	Year	Apps	Goals
Colombia	2019	2	0
Colombia	2020	0	0
Colombia	2021	12	0
Colombia	2022	6	2
Colombia	2023	10	3
Colombia	2024	9	1
Colombia	2025	5	0
Total		44	6

Scores and results list Colombia's goal tally first.

List of international goals scored by Rafael Santos Borré
No.	Date	Venue	Opponent	Score	Result	Competition
1	5 June 2022	Estadio Enrique Roca de Murcia, Murcia, Spain	Saudi Arabia	1–0	1–0	Friendly
2	24 September 2022	Red Bull Arena, Harrison, United States	Guatemala	3–0	4–1	Friendly
3	28 March 2023	Yodoko Sakura Stadium, Osaka, Japan	Japan	2–1	2–1	2023 Kirin Challenge Cup
4	7 September 2023	Estadio Metropolitano Roberto Meléndez, Barranquilla, Colombia	Venezuela	1–0	1–0	2026 FIFA World Cup qualification
5	21 November 2023	Estadio Defensores del Chaco, Asunción, Paraguay	Paraguay	1–0	1–0	2026 FIFA World Cup qualification
6	8 June 2024	Commanders Field, Landover, United States	United States	2–0	5–1	Friendly

== Honours ==
Deportivo Cali

- Categoría Primera A: 2015 (Apertura)
- Superliga Colombiana: 2014

River Plate

- Copa Libertadores: 2018
- Recopa Sudamericana: 2019
- Copa Argentina: 2016–17, 2018–19
- Supercopa Argentina: 2017, 2019

Eintracht Frankfurt

- UEFA Europa League: 2021–22

Internacional

- Campeonato Gaúcho: 2025
- Recopa Gaúcha: 2026

Colombia

- Copa América runner-up: 2024

Individual

- Copa Colombia Top scorer: 2015
- FIFA Club World Cup Bronze Ball: 2018
- FIFA Club World Cup Golden Boot: 2018
- Argentine Primera División Top scorer: 2019–20
- South American Team of the Year: 2020
- Copa Libertadores Team of the Tournament: 2020
- Copa de la Liga Profesional Top scorer: 2021
- UEFA Europa League Team of the Season: 2021–22
