= Felix Irorere =

French footballer (born 2002)

Personal information
- Full name: Felix Omoruyi Irorere
- Date of birth: 21 June 2002 (age 24)
- Place of birth: Saint-Denis, France
- Height: 1.95 m (6 ft 5 in)
- Position: Centre-back

Youth career
- –2013: Schwarz Weiß Griesheim
- 2013–2021: Eintracht Frankfurt

Senior career*
Years	Team	Apps	(Gls)
2021–2023	Karlsruher SC	2	(0)
2023–2025	Borussia Dortmund II	0	(0)
- * Club domestic league appearances and goals as of 27 April 2026

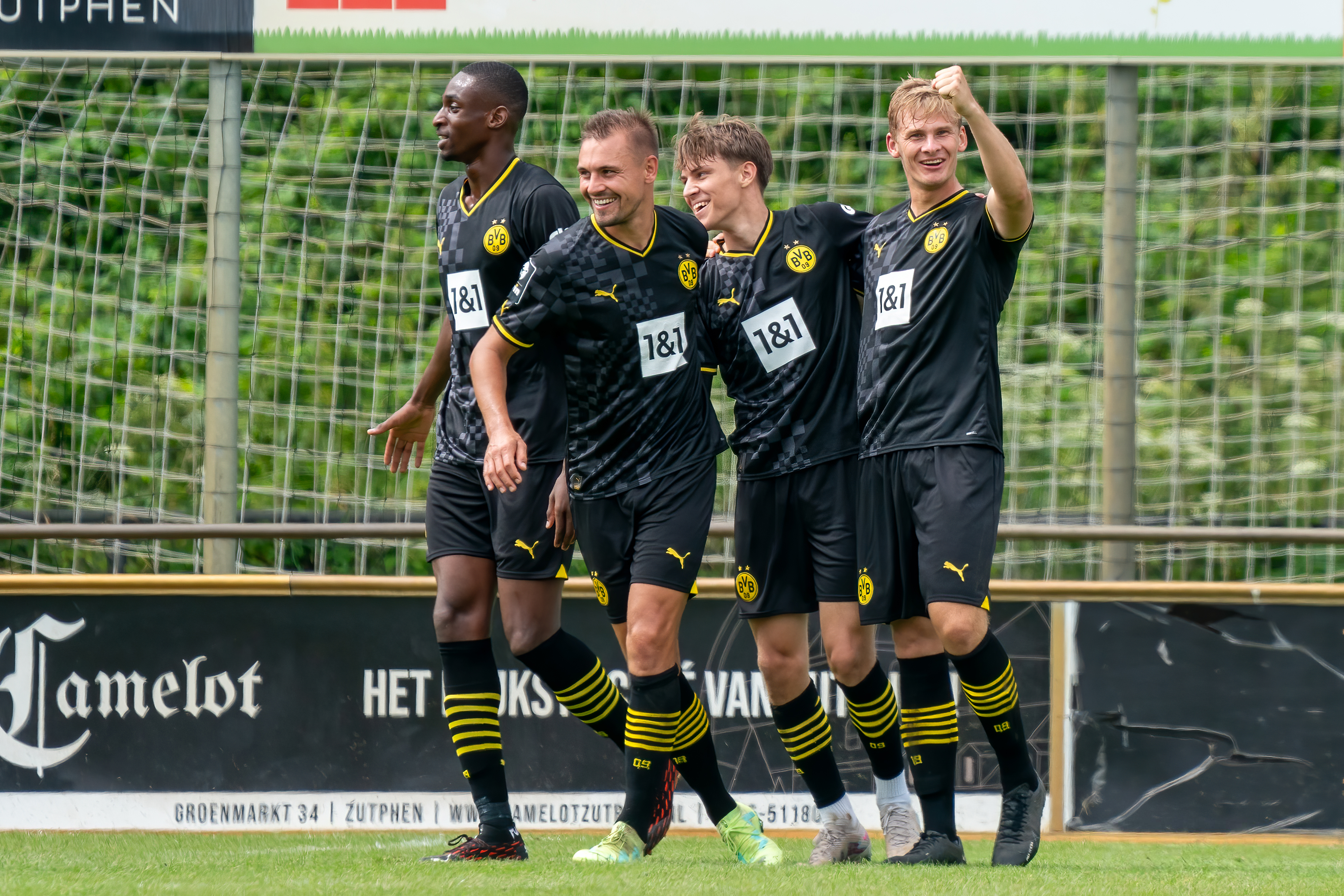
Felix Irorere (playing for Borussia Dortmund II) during a friendly game against Go Ahead Eagles in July 2023

Felix Omoruyi Irorere (born 21 June 2002) is a French professional footballer who plays as a centre-back and is currently without a club.

== Club career ==
Born in Saint-Denis, France, Irorere played youth football for Schwarz Weiß Griesheim, before joining Eintracht Frankfurt's academy in 2013. In October 2018, Irorere signed a scholarship contract with the club until 2020, with the option of a professional contract. He signed a professional contract with the club in 2020 but his development was set back by two meniscus tears in 2019 and 2021. In August 2021, he signed for 2. Bundesliga club Karlsruher SC on a two-year contract.

== International career ==
Born in France, Irorere is of Nigerian descent and moved to Germany at a young age. He is eligible to represent all three nations internationally. He was called up to a training camp for the Germany under-15s in November 2016.
