= Fabio Blanco =

Spanish footballer (born 2004)

Personal information
- Full name: Fabio Blanco Gómez
- Date of birth: 18 February 2004 (age 22)
- Place of birth: Almería, Spain
- Height: 1.79 m (5 ft 10 in)
- Position: Winger

Team information
- Current team: Vitória de Guimarães
- Number: 22

Youth career
- 2016–2019: Almería
- 2019–2021: Valencia
- 2021–2022: Eintracht Frankfurt
- 2022: Barcelona

Senior career*
| Years | Team | Apps | (Gls) |
| 2022–2023 | Barcelona B | 37 | (4) |
| 2023–2025 | Villarreal B | 19 | (0) |
| 2024 | → Cultural Leonesa (loan) | 18 | (0) |
| 2025 | Marítimo | 16 | (0) |
| 2025– | Vitória de Guimarães | 15 | (0) |

International career^{‡}
| 2019 | Spain U15 | 3 | (0) |
| 2019–2020 | Spain U16 | 5 | (1) |
| 2021–2022 | Spain U18 | 11 | (0) |
| 2022 | Spain U19 | 4 | (0) |
- * Club domestic league appearances and goals as of 25 May 2026 ‡ National team caps and goals as of 19:58, 11 November 2025 (UTC)

Fabio Blanco Gómez (born 18 February 2004) is a Spanish footballer who plays as a winger for Primeira Liga club Vitória de Guimarães.

== Club career ==
=== Early career ===
Blanco trained in the youth ranks at his hometown club UD Almería before moving to Valencia CF when he was 15. He played with Valencia until the end of the 2020–21 season when he allowed his contract to run down and became a free agent. That summer he chose to join Eintracht Frankfurt, signing a contract until 2023 amidst reported interest from Bayern Munich, Real Madrid and Barcelona.

=== Barcelona ===
However, after failing to settle in Germany and following a lot of upheaval to the back room staff in Frankfurt involving a new manager, sporting director and chairman, Blanco signed for FC Barcelona in January 2022. He was given a two-and-a-half-year contract with a €100m release clause. Barcelona were well placed in negotiations because they had appointed José Ramón Alexanko and Mateu Alemany as new head of La Masia and sporting director respectively, with both having previously worked with Blanco at Valencia.

Blanco made his senior debut with the reserves on 29 January 2022, replacing Santiago Ramos Mingo in a 2–2 Primera División RFEF home draw against Real Madrid Castilla. He scored his first senior goal on 19 March, netting the winner in a 2–1 home success over UE Cornellà.

In October 2022, along with Antonio Aranda, Emre Demir and Sergi Rosanas, Blanco was called into involvement with the first-team squad training by Barcelona manager Xavi.

=== Villarreal ===
On 20 June 2023, Blanco was announced at Villarreal CF, being initially assigned to the B-team in Segunda División. The following 12 January, after being rarely used, he returned to the third division with Cultural y Deportiva Leonesa on loan for the remainder of the season.

=== In Portugal ===
On 14 January 2025, Blanco left Villarreal and joined Liga Portugal 2 club Marítimo on a contract until 2027. After 16 appearances in six months with the Funchal-based side, he moved to Primeira Liga club Vitória de Guimarães, signing a four-year contract.

== International career ==
On 25 October 2022 playing for the Spanish under-19 age group team Blanco provided the assist for the goal by Real Madrid’s César Palacios in a 1–0 win over Germany U19.

== Honours ==
Vitória SC

- Taça da Liga: 2025–26
