= Amin Farouk =

German footballer (born 2003)

Personal information
- Date of birth: 22 July 2003 (age 23)
- Place of birth: Mainz, Germany
- Height: 1.80 m (5 ft 11 in)
- Position: Midfielder

Team information
- Current team: SC Verl
- Number: 7

Youth career
- Mainz 05
- –2021: SV Wehen Wiesbaden

Senior career*
Years	Team	Apps	(Gls)
2021–2025	SV Wehen Wiesbaden	21	(0)
2023	→ FSV Frankfurt (loan)	7	(1)
2025–2026	FSV Frankfurt	27	(7)
2026–	SC Verl	0	(0)
- * Club domestic league appearances and goals as of 26 June 2026

Amin Farouk (Arabic: أمين فاروق; born 22 July 2003) is a German professional footballer who plays as a midfielder for 3. Liga club SC Verl.

== Career ==
On 27 January 2023, Farouk was loaned by FSV Frankfurt.

== Career statistics ==
As of 31 July 2021

Club	Season	League			Cup		Continental		Other		Total	
Club	Season	Division	Apps	Goals	Apps	Goals	Apps	Goals	Apps	Goals	Apps	Goals
Wehen Wiesbaden	2021–22	3. Liga	1	0	0	0	–		0	0	1	0
Career total			1	0	0	0	0	0	0	0	1	0
