= Tuta (footballer, born 1999) =

Brazilian footballer

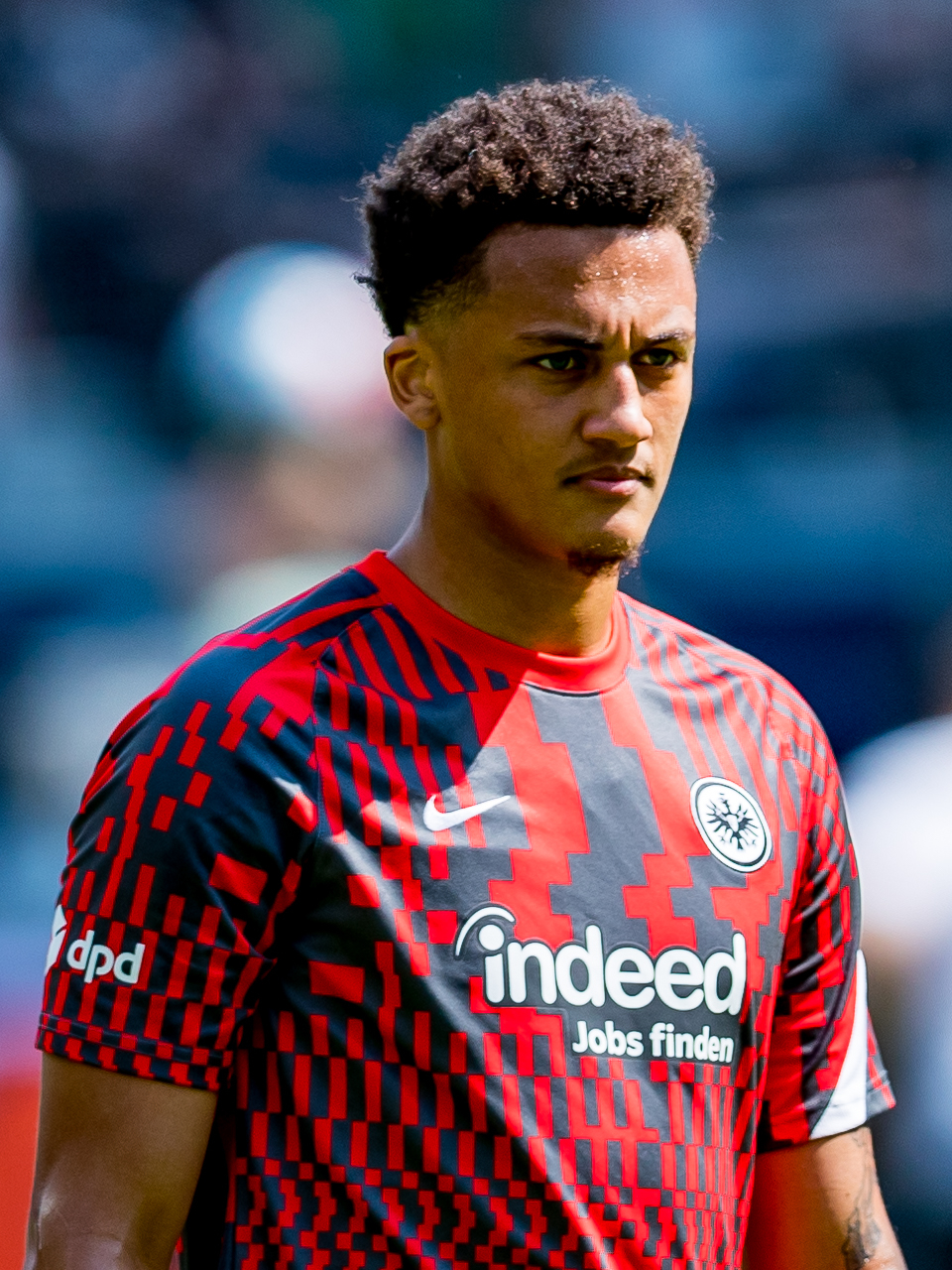
- Tuta warming up for Eintracht Frankfurt in 2022

Personal information
- Full name: Lucas Silva Melo
- Date of birth: 4 July 1999 (age 27)
- Place of birth: São Paulo, Brazil
- Height: 1.85 m (6 ft 1 in)
- Position: Centre-back

Team information
- Current team: Al-Duhail
- Number: 3

Youth career
- –2018: São Paulo

Senior career*
Years	Team	Apps	(Gls)
2018–2019	São Paulo	0	(0)
2019–2025	Eintracht Frankfurt	136	(9)
2019–2020	→ Kortrijk (loan)	14	(1)
2025–	Al-Duhail	0	(0)
- * Club domestic league appearances and goals as of 17 May 2025

Lucas Silva Melo (born 4 July 1999), known as Tuta, is a Brazilian professional footballer who plays as a centre-back for Qatari club Al-Duhail.

He acquired his nickname due to his likeness to former Brazilian footballer Moacir Bastos, who is also known as Tuta.

== Career ==
In January 2019, Tuta joined Bundesliga club Eintracht Frankfurt from São Paulo, signing a four-and-a-half-year contract lasting until 30 June 2023. In August 2019, Tuta joined Belgian club Kortrijk on a season-long loan from Frankfurt. He made his debut for Kortrijk in the Belgian First Division A on 24 November 2019, starting in the away match against Anderlecht, which finished as a 0–0 draw. He made 18 appearances and scored one goal for Kortrijk until April 2020, when the season was ended early due to the COVID-19 pandemic.

He returned to Frankfurt for the Bundesliga 2020-21 season and made four appearances for the club the first half of the season. After Eintracht team captain David Abraham retired from professional football in January 2021, Tuta became a starting player, playing in the central defense together with Evan Ndicka and Martin Hinteregger. Tuta scored his first goal for Frankfurt and in the Bundesliga on 30 October 2021, when he scored the late equalizer in a 1-1 draw against RB Leipzig.

On 18 May 2022, Tuta won the 2021–22 UEFA Europa League title. He appeared in the starting formation in the final against Rangers.

On 4 August 2025, Tuta signed with Al-Duhail in Qatar.

== Career statistics ==
As of match played 11 May 2025

Appearances and goals by club, season and competition
Club	Season	League			Cup		Europe		Other		Total	
Club	Season	Division	Apps	Goals	Apps	Goals	Apps	Goals	Apps	Goals	Apps	Goals
Eintracht Frankfurt	2020–21	Bundesliga	19	0	1	0	—		—		20	0
Eintracht Frankfurt	2021–22	Bundesliga	26	4	1	0	11	0	—		38	4
Eintracht Frankfurt	2022–23	Bundesliga	31	2	5	0	8	0	1 (Note: Appearance in UEFA Super Cup)	0	45	2
Eintracht Frankfurt	2023–24	Bundesliga	30	1	3	0	8 (Note: Appearances in UEFA Europa Conference League)	1	—		41	2
Eintracht Frankfurt	2024–25	Bundesliga	30	2	3	0	10 (Note: Appearances in UEFA Europa League)	0	—		43	2
Eintracht Frankfurt	Total		136	9	13	0	37	1	1	0	187	10
Kortrijk (loan)	2019–20	Belgian Pro League	14	1	4	0	—		—		18	1
Career total			150	10	17	0	38	1	1	0	205	11

== Honours ==
Eintracht Frankfurt

- UEFA Europa League: 2021–22
