= 2023–24 Regionalliga =

16th season of the Regionalliga

Regionalliga
- Season: 2023–24
- Champions: Hannover 96 II (Nord); Energie Cottbus (Nordost); Alemannia Aachen (West); VfB Stuttgart II (Südwest); Würzburger Kickers (Bayern)
- Promoted: Hannover 96 II; Energie Cottbus; Alemannia Aachen; VfB Stuttgart II
- Relegated: Eimsbütteler TV; Kilia Kiel; SC Spelle-Venhaus; Hansa Rostock II; Berliner AK; SV Lippstadt; SSVg Velbert; FC Wegberg-Beeck; Rot Weiss Ahlen; VfR Aalen; Schott Mainz; TSG Balingen; TuS Koblenz; SV Schalding-Heining; FC Memmingen

The 2023–24 Regionalliga was the 16th season of the Regionalliga, the twelfth under the new format, as the fourth tier of the German football league system.

== Format ==
According to the promotion rules decided upon in 2019, the Regionalliga Südwest and West retained direct promotion spots. Based on a rotation principle, the Regionalliga Nordost received the third direct promotion spot this season, while the Regionalliga Bayern and Nord champions played a promotion play-off.

== Regionalliga Nord ==
18 teams from the states of Bremen, Hamburg, Lower Saxony and Schleswig-Holstein competed in the twelfth season of the reformed Regionalliga Nord. VfB Oldenburg and SV Meppen were relegated from the 2022–23 3. Liga. SC Spelle-Venhaus was promoted from the 2022–23 Oberliga Niedersachsen, Eimsbütteler TV from the 2022–23 Oberliga Hamburg and Kilia Kiel from the 2022–23 Oberliga Schleswig-Holstein.

Pos	Team	Pld	W	D	L	GF	GA	GD	Pts	Qualification or relegation
1	Hannover 96 II (C, O, P)	34	24	4	6	90	40	+50	76	Qualification for promotion play-offs
2	SV Meppen	34	22	5	7	74	39	+35	71	
3	Phönix Lübeck	34	20	5	9	84	40	+44	65	
4	SV Drochtersen/Assel	34	17	10	7	56	42	+14	61	
5	VfB Oldenburg	34	16	9	9	63	44	+19	57	
6	Holstein Kiel II	34	16	8	10	63	53	+10	56	
7	Hamburger SV II	34	14	9	11	55	53	+2	51	
8	TSV Havelse	34	14	7	13	57	54	+3	49	
9	Teutonia Ottensen	34	13	9	12	60	49	+11	48	
10	Blau-Weiß Lohne	34	12	10	12	51	49	+2	46	
11	Bremer SV	34	11	13	10	54	61	−7	46	
12	FC St. Pauli II	34	11	10	13	61	46	+15	43	
13	Eintracht Norderstedt	34	13	4	17	57	64	−7	43	
14	SSV Jeddeloh	34	9	12	13	41	64	−23	39	
15	Weiche Flensburg (O)	34	9	11	14	44	59	−15	38	Qualification for relegation play-offs
16	Eimsbütteler TV (R)	34	5	7	22	35	74	−39	22	Relegation to Oberliga
17	Kilia Kiel (R)	34	3	11	20	39	86	−47	20	Relegation to Oberliga
18	SC Spelle-Venhaus (R)	34	2	6	26	30	97	−67	12	Relegation to Oberliga

Source: kicker.de
Rules for classification: 1) Points; 2) Goal difference; 3) Goals scored
(C) Champions; (O) Play-off winners; (P) Promoted; (R) Relegated

=== Top scorers ===
Rank	Player	Club	Goals
1	(Germany) Tom Sanne	Hamburger SV II	24
2	(Germany) Stanislav Fehler	Holstein Kiel II	21
2	(Germany) Lars Gindorf	Hannover 96 II	21
4	(Germany) Marek Janssen	SV Meppen	20
5	(Germany) Christopher Schepp	SV Meppen	18

=== Relegation play-offs ===
Team 1	Agg.	Team 2	1st leg	2nd leg
TuS Bersenbrück	3–4	Weiche Flensburg	2–2	1–2

== Regionalliga Nordost ==
18 teams from the states of Berlin, Brandenburg, Mecklenburg-Vorpommern, Saxony, Saxony-Anhalt and Thuringia competed in the twelfth season of the reformed Regionalliga Nordost. FSV Zwickau was relegated from the 2022–23 3. Liga. Hansa Rostock II was promoted from the 2022–23 NOFV-Oberliga Nord and FC Eilenburg from the 2022–23 NOFV-Oberliga Süd.

Pos	Team	Pld	W	D	L	GF	GA	GD	Pts	Promotion or relegation
1	Energie Cottbus (C, P)	34	21	8	5	68	37	+31	71	Promotion to 3. Liga
2	Greifswalder FC	34	19	11	4	67	32	+35	68	
3	Viktoria Berlin	34	18	9	7	54	39	+15	63	
4	BFC Dynamo	34	17	10	7	59	38	+21	61	
5	SV Babelsberg	34	16	8	10	42	34	+8	56	
6	VSG Altglienicke	34	15	8	11	68	49	+19	53	
7	Carl Zeiss Jena	34	14	11	9	59	44	+15	53	
8	Chemie Leipzig	34	13	11	10	40	40	0	50	
9	Chemnitzer FC	34	13	6	15	44	51	−7	45	
10	Lokomotive Leipzig	34	11	10	13	48	56	−8	43	
11	ZFC Meuselwitz	34	11	8	15	47	51	−4	41	
12	FSV Zwickau	34	12	5	17	50	59	−9	41	
13	Rot-Weiß Erfurt	34	9	12	13	53	56	−3	39	
14	Hertha BSC II	34	11	5	18	48	65	−17	38	
15	FSV Luckenwalde	34	10	7	17	50	61	−11	37	
16	FC Eilenburg	34	9	9	16	42	60	−18	36	
17	Hansa Rostock II (R)	34	7	7	20	46	65	−19	28	Relegation to NOFV-Oberliga
18	Berliner AK (R)	34	4	7	23	24	72	−48	19	Relegation to NOFV-Oberliga

Source: kicker.de
Rules for classification: 1) Points; 2) Goal difference; 3) Goals scored
(C) Champions; (P) Promoted; (R) Relegated

=== Top scorers ===
Rank	Player	Club	Goals
1	(Germany) Elias Löder	Carl Zeiss Jena	25
2	(Germany) Soufian Benyamina	Greifswalder FC	21
2	(Germany) Tim Heike	Energie Cottbus	21
4	(Turkey) Tolcay Ciğerci	VSG Altglienicke	20
5	(Brazil) Lucas Cini	Viktoria Berlin	15

== Regionalliga West ==
18 teams from North Rhine-Westphalia competed in the twelfth season of the reformed Regionalliga West. FC Wegberg-Beeck was promoted from the 2022–23 Mittelrheinliga, SSVg Velbert from the 2022–23 Oberliga Niederrhein, and FC Gütersloh and SC Paderborn II both from the 2022–23 Oberliga Westfalen.

Pos	Team	Pld	W	D	L	GF	GA	GD	Pts	Promotion or relegation
1	Alemannia Aachen (C, P)	34	23	6	5	65	34	+31	75	Promotion to 3. Liga
2	1. FC Bocholt	34	18	9	7	49	31	+18	63	
3	Wuppertaler SV	34	19	5	10	68	44	+24	62	
4	Fortuna Köln	34	16	8	10	59	38	+21	56	
5	Schalke 04 II	34	15	9	10	67	47	+20	54	
6	1. FC Köln II	34	15	7	12	55	48	+7	52	
7	Rot-Weiß Oberhausen	34	12	15	7	56	36	+20	51	
8	SV Rödinghausen	34	15	6	13	46	42	+4	51	
9	1. FC Düren	34	13	11	10	60	47	+13	50	
10	SC Wiedenbrück	34	13	9	12	45	48	−3	48	
11	Fortuna Düsseldorf II	34	13	6	15	51	49	+2	45	
12	Borussia Mönchengladbach II	34	11	9	14	57	61	−4	42	
13	FC Gütersloh	34	11	8	15	40	61	−21	41	
14	SC Paderborn II	34	9	12	13	51	51	0	39	
15	SV Lippstadt (R)	34	8	9	17	40	63	−23	33	Relegation to Oberliga
16	SSVg Velbert (R)	34	8	8	18	38	71	−33	32	Relegation to Oberliga
17	FC Wegberg-Beeck (R)	34	8	2	24	43	77	−34	26	Relegation to Oberliga
18	Rot Weiss Ahlen (R)	34	6	7	21	37	79	−42	25	Relegation to Oberliga

Source: kicker.de
Rules for classification: 1) Points; 2) Goal difference; 3) Goals scored
(C) Champions; (P) Promoted; (R) Relegated

=== Top scorers ===
Rank	Player	Club	Goals
1	(Germany) Anton Heinz	Alemannia Aachen	20
2	(Germany) Malek Fakhro	1. FC Bocholt	15
2	(Germany) Moritz Stoppelkamp	Rot-Weiß Oberhausen	15
4	(Curaçao) Charlison Benschop	Wuppertaler SV	13
4	(Germany) Shpend Hasani	FC Wegberg-Beeck	13

== Regionalliga Südwest ==
18 teams from Baden-Württemberg, Hesse, Rhineland-Palatinate and Saarland competed in the twelfth season of the Regionalliga Südwest. Schott Mainz and TuS Koblenz were promoted from the 2022–23 Oberliga Rheinland-Pfalz/Saar, Stuttgarter Kickers from the 2022–23 Oberliga Baden-Württemberg and Eintracht Frankfurt II from the 2022–23 Hessenliga.

Pos	Team	Pld	W	D	L	GF	GA	GD	Pts	Promotion or relegation
1	VfB Stuttgart II (C, P)	34	19	8	7	78	50	+28	65	Promotion to 3. Liga
2	Stuttgarter Kickers	34	18	9	7	61	35	+26	63	
3	TSG Hoffenheim II	34	18	5	11	64	29	+35	59	
4	SGV Freiberg	34	17	8	9	55	38	+17	59	
5	FC 08 Homburg	34	17	7	10	68	46	+22	58	
6	Eintracht Frankfurt II	34	16	9	9	61	46	+15	57	
7	Barockstadt Fulda-Lehnerz	34	15	6	13	50	44	+6	51	
8	Mainz 05 II	34	15	5	14	56	60	−4	50	
9	FSV Frankfurt	34	13	9	12	47	46	+1	48	
10	Hessen Kassel	34	13	8	13	49	50	−1	47	
11	Kickers Offenbach	34	13	7	14	58	49	+9	46	
12	TSV Steinbach Haiger	34	13	5	16	55	62	−7	44	
13	Bahlinger SC	34	11	11	12	43	51	−8	44	
14	Astoria Walldorf	34	11	9	14	40	53	−13	42	
15	VfR Aalen (R)	34	8	10	16	38	58	−20	34	Relegation to Oberliga
16	Schott Mainz (R)	34	7	10	17	51	78	−27	31	Relegation to Oberliga
17	TSG Balingen (R)	34	7	10	17	55	84	−29	31	Relegation to Oberliga
18	TuS Koblenz (R)	34	4	6	24	30	80	−50	18	Relegation to Oberliga

Source: kicker.de
Rules for classification: 1) Points; 2) Goal difference; 3) Goals scored; 4) Head-to-head points; 5) Head-to-head goal difference; 6) Head-to-head goals scored; 7) Head-to-head away goals scored; 8) Away goals scored; 9) Play-off (only when deciding promotion or relegation)
(C) Champions; (P) Promoted; (R) Relegated

=== Top scorers ===
Rank	Player	Club	Goals
1	(Germany) Phil Harres	FC 08 Homburg	24
2	(Germany) Dejan Galjen	VfB Stuttgart II	21
3	(Germany) Noel Futkeu	Eintracht Frankfurt II	16
3	(Germany) Raul Paula	VfB Stuttgart II	16
5	(Turkey) Sercan Sararer	Hessen Kassel	15

== Regionalliga Bayern ==
18 teams from Bavaria competed in the eleventh season of the Regionalliga Bayern. SpVgg Bayreuth was relegated from the 2022–23 3. Liga. Eintracht Bamberg was promoted from the 2022–23 Bayernliga Nord and SV Schalding-Heining and FC Memmingen from the 2022–23 Bayernliga Süd.

Pos	Team	Pld	W	D	L	GF	GA	GD	Pts	Qualification or relegation
1	Würzburger Kickers (C)	34	25	7	2	79	20	+59	82	Qualification for promotion play-offs and DFB-Pokal
2	DJK Vilzing	34	22	3	9	75	42	+33	69	
3	1. FC Nürnberg II (Note: Reserve teams are ineligible for qualification for the DFB-Pokal.)	34	19	4	11	77	50	+27	61	
4	TSV Aubstadt	34	16	10	8	52	36	+16	58	
5	FV Illertissen	34	17	5	12	60	49	+11	56	
6	Bayern Munich II	34	14	12	8	60	46	+14	54	
7	FC Augsburg II	34	13	11	10	56	44	+12	50	
8	Greuther Fürth II	34	15	4	15	52	52	0	49	
9	Wacker Burghausen	34	14	6	14	51	47	+4	48	
10	Türkgücü München	34	14	5	15	45	56	−11	45 (Note: Türkgücü München was deducted 2 points for fielding two players against 1. FC Nürnberg II without submitting proof of their social insurance within the deadline.)	
11	1. FC Schweinfurt	34	13	6	15	48	57	−9	44 (Note: 1. FC Schweinfurt was deducted 1 point due to riots during the away match against Würzburger Kickers.)	
12	SpVgg Bayreuth	34	10	12	12	40	44	−4	42	
13	SpVgg Ansbach	34	11	6	17	48	61	−13	39	
14	Viktoria Aschaffenburg	34	9	9	16	34	49	−15	36	
15	Eintracht Bamberg (O)	34	8	7	19	33	69	−36	31	Qualification for relegation play-offs
16	TSV Buchbach (O)	34	8	6	20	36	60	−24	30	Qualification for relegation play-offs
17	SV Schalding-Heining (R)	34	8	6	20	37	63	−26	30	Relegation to Bayernliga
18	FC Memmingen (R)	34	8	5	21	38	76	−38	29	Relegation to Bayernliga

Source: kicker.de
Rules for classification: 1) Points; 2) Goal difference; 3) Goals scored
(C) Champions; (O) Play-off winners; (R) Relegated

=== Top scorers ===
Rank	Player	Club	Goals
1	(Germany) Julian Kania	1. FC Nürnberg II	24
2	(Germany) Saliou Sané	Würzburger Kickers	19
3	(Germany) Ricky Bornschein	Greuther Fürth II	17
4	(Germany) Yannick Glessing	FV Illertissen	16
5	(Germany) Andreas Jünger	DJK Vilzing	13

=== Relegation play-offs ===
Ordinarily, the relegation play-offs are played as two-legged matches between the 15th and 16th-placed teams of the Regionalliga Bayern and the runners-up of the two Bayernliga divisions. However, since only one team from the 2023–24 Bayernliga Süd, Schwaben Augsburg, applied for a Regionalliga license, thereby gaining direct promotion, the three remaining teams played a single round-robin tournament instead, with the top two qualifying for the next Regionalliga season.

Pos	Team	Pld	W	D	L	GF	GA	GD	Pts	Qualification	BAM	BUC	EIC
1	Eintracht Bamberg (O)	2	0	2	0	0	0	0	2 (Note: Penalty shoot-out bonus points: Bamberg 2, Buchbach 1, Eichstätt 0.)	Qualification for Regionalliga	—	0–0 (5–4 p)	—
2	TSV Buchbach (O)	2	0	2	0	1	1	0	2	Qualification for Regionalliga	—	—	1–1 (4–2 p)
3	VfB Eichstätt	2	0	2	0	1	1	0	2	Qualification for Bayernliga	0–0 (4–5 p)	—	—

Source: kicker.de
Rules for classification: 1) Points; 2) Penalty shoot-out bonus points; 3) Goal difference; 4) Goals scored
(O) Play-off winners

== Promotion play-offs ==
The order of the legs was determined in a draw. The matches were scheduled for 22 and 26 May 2024, but since Würzburger Kickers qualified for the final of the 2023–24 Bavarian Cup, scheduled for 25 May 2024, the matches were instead played on 29 May and 2 June 2024.

Team 1	Agg.	Team 2	1st leg	2nd leg
Würzburger Kickers	3–3 (4–5 p)	Hannover 96 II	1–0	2–3 (a.e.t.)

All times Central European Summer Time (UTC+2)

29 May 2024
19:00

Würzburger Kickers	1–0	Hannover 96 II
Franjić 22'	Report

Akon Arena, Würzburg
Attendance: 10,452
Referee: Max Burda
2 June 2024
13:30

Hannover 96 II	3–2 (a.e.t.)	Würzburger Kickers
Ezeh 22'; Uhlmann 85' (pen.); Matsuda 105'	Report	Sané 75' (pen.); Franjić 112' (pen.)
Penalties
Börner (penalty scored); Matsuda (penalty scored); Ezeh (penalty scored); Oudenne (penalty scored); Uhlmann (penalty scored)	5–4	(penalty scored) Kurzweg; (penalty scored) Sausen; (penalty scored) Karimani; (penalty missed) Sané; (penalty scored) Franjić

Heinz von Heiden Arena, Hanover
Attendance: 25,000
Referee: Florian Exner
