= Marcel Wenig =

German footballer (born 2004)

Personal information
- Full name: Marcel Thomas Wenig
- Date of birth: 4 May 2004 (age 22)
- Place of birth: Nuremberg, Germany
- Height: 1.88 m (6 ft 2 in)
- Position: Midfielder

Team information
- Current team: SSV Ulm
- Number: 6

Youth career
- TSV Mühlhof
- –2017: 1. FC Nürnberg
- 2017–2022: Bayern Munich

Senior career*
Years	Team	Apps	(Gls)
2021–2022	Bayern Munich II	3	(1)
2022–2025	Eintracht Frankfurt II	61	(12)
2022–2023	Eintracht Frankfurt	1	(0)
2024	→ 1. FC Nürnberg (loan)	0	(0)
2025–	SSV Ulm	4	(0)

International career^{‡}
2022	Germany U18	2	(0)
2022	Germany U19	3	(0)
- * Club domestic league appearances and goals as of 8 October 2025 ‡ National team caps and goals as of 12:10, 12 December 2023 (UTC)

Marcel Thomas Wenig (Greek: Μαρσέλ Τόμας Βένιγκ; born 4 May 2004) is a German-Greek professional footballer who plays as a midfielder for club SSV Ulm.

== Club career ==
=== Bayern Munich ===
Being a product from 1. FC Nürnberg's academy, Wenig signed for Bayern Munich, aged 13. He joined the U15s team and rose through the ranks to the reserves team, FC Bayern Munich II. In the 2021–22 season he appeared three times in the Regionalliga Bayern, scoring a goal for Bayern II.

=== Eintracht Frankfurt ===
In February 2022, the midfielder signed for Eintracht Frankfurt his professional terms until 30 June 2025 and joins the Bundesliga team's first squad. Being utilised primarily in the Eintracht reserves team, Eintracht Frankfurt II in the 5th tier Hessenliga and the U19 team in the UEFA Youth League, Wenig debuted in the Bundersliga as a substitute in October 2022 against Bayer 04 Leverkusen.

==== Loan to 1. FC Nürnberg ====
On 8 January 2024, Wenig returned to 2. Bundesliga side 1. FC Nürnberg on loan until the end of the season. Just two days later, he suffered an ACL injury in a friendly game.

=== Ulm ===
On 4 June 2025, Wenig signed a two-year contract with SSV Ulm in 3. Liga.

== International career ==
Wenig was capped for Germany U18 in late March 2022 for test matches. In September 2022 he was called up for Germany U19 and played three matches in the Euro qualifiers. He is also eligible for Greece through his mother. On 8 November 2023 he received his first international call-up for Greece U21

== Career statistics ==
As of match played 3 December 2023

Appearances and goals by club, season and competition
Club	Season	League			Cup		Other		Total	
Club	Season	Division	Apps	Goals	Apps	Goals	Apps	Goals	Apps	Goals
Bayern Munich II	2021–22	Regionalliga Bayern	3	1	—		—		3	1
Eintracht Frankfurt	2022–23	Bundesliga	1	0	1	0	0	0	2	0
Eintracht Frankfurt II	2022–23	Hessenliga	19	7	—		—		19	7
Eintracht Frankfurt II	2023–24	Regionalliga Bayern	19	1	—		—		19	1
Eintracht Frankfurt II	Total		38	8	—		—		38	8
Nürnberg (loan)	2023–24	2. Bundesliga	0	0	0	0	0	0	0	0
Career total			42	9	1	0	0	0	43	9
