= 2022–23 Eintracht Frankfurt season =

Eintracht Frankfurt
2022–23 season
- President: Peter Fischer
- Chairmen: Markus Krösche; Axel Hellmann; Oliver Frankenbach; Philipp Reschke
- Head coach: Oliver Glasner
- Bundesliga: 7th
- DFB-Pokal: Runners-up
- UEFA Champions League: Round of 16
- UEFA Super Cup: Runners-up
- Top goalscorer: League: Randal Kolo Muani (15); All: Randal Kolo Muani (23)
- Highest home attendance: 51,500, 5 August 2022 v Bayern Munich (league)
- Lowest home attendance: 49,000, 10 September 2022 v VfL Wolfsburg and 9 November 2022 v 1899 Hoffenheim (league)
- Average home league attendance: 50,011
| Home colours | Away colours | Third colours |

The 2022–23 season was the 123rd season in the history of Eintracht Frankfurt, a football club based in Frankfurt, Germany. In addition to the domestic league, Eintracht Frankfurt also participated in this season's edition of the domestic cup, the DFB-Pokal, the UEFA Champions League and the UEFA Super Cup. This was the 98th season for Frankfurt in the Deutsche Bank Park, located in Frankfurt, Hesse, Germany. The season covers a period from 1 July 2022 to 30 June 2023.

== Players ==
=== Squad ===
As of 31 January 2023

Note: Flags indicate national team as defined under FIFA eligibility rules; some limited exceptions apply. Players may hold more than one non-FIFA nationality.

| No. | Pos. | Nation | Player |
|---|---|---|---|
| 1 | GK | GER | Kevin Trapp |
| 2 | DF | FRA | Evan Ndicka |
| 5 | DF | CRO | Hrvoje Smolčić |
| 6 | MF | CRO | Kristijan Jakić |
| 8 | MF | SUI | Djibril Sow |
| 9 | FW | FRA | Randal Kolo Muani |
| 11 | FW | GER | Faride Alidou |
| 15 | MF | JPN | Daichi Kamada |
| 17 | MF | GER | Sebastian Rode (captain) |
| 18 | DF | MLI | Almamy Touré |
| 19 | FW | COL | Rafael Santos Borré |
| 20 | MF | JPN | Makoto Hasebe |
| 21 | FW | ARG | Lucas Alario |
| 22 | DF | USA | Timothy Chandler |
| 24 | DF | POR | Aurélio Buta |

| No. | Pos. | Nation | Player |
|---|---|---|---|
| 25 | DF | GER | Christopher Lenz |
| 26 | MF | FRA | Éric Junior Dina Ebimbe (on loan from Paris Saint-Germain) |
| 27 | FW | GER | Mario Götze |
| 28 | MF | GER | Marcel Wenig |
| 29 | MF | DEN | Jesper Lindstrøm |
| 30 | MF | USA | Paxten Aaronson |
| 31 | GK | GER | Jens Grahl |
| 32 | DF | GER | Philipp Max (on loan from PSV Eindhoven) |
| 35 | DF | BRA | Tuta |
| 36 | MF | GER | Ansgar Knauff (on loan from Borussia Dortmund) |
| 40 | GK | GER | Diant Ramaj |
| 41 | GK | ALB | Simon Simoni |
| 42 | MF | GER | Mehdi Loune |
| 46 | DF | GER | Dario Gebuhr |
| 48 | FW | ESP | Nacho Ferri |
| 49 | DF | GER | Jan Schröder |

=== Players out on loan ===
Note: Flags indicate national team as defined under FIFA eligibility rules; some limited exceptions apply. Players may hold more than one non-FIFA nationality.

| No. | Pos. | Nation | Player |
|---|---|---|---|
| — | FW | GER | Ragnar Ache (at Greuther Fürth until 30 June 2023) |
| — | FW | TUR | Ali Akman (at Göztepe until 30 June 2023) |
| — | MF | CYP | Antonio Foti (at Hannover 96 until 30 June 2023) |

| No. | Pos. | Nation | Player |
|---|---|---|---|
| — | FW | NOR | Jens Petter Hauge (at KAA Gent until 30 June 2023) |
| — | FW | GER | Igor Matanović (at FC St. Pauli until 30 June 2023) |
| — | DF | CMR | Jérôme Onguéné (at Salzburg until 30 June 2023) |

== Transfers ==
=== In ===
| No. | Pos. | Player | Transferred from | Fee | Date | Source |
|---|---|---|---|---|---|---|
| | GK | (Germany) Elias Bördner | (Germany) Viktoria Köln | Loan return | 30 June 2022 | |
| | MF | (Germany) Dominik Kohr | (Germany) Mainz 05 | Loan return | 30 June 2022 | |
| | MF | (Slovenia) Martin Pečar | Austria Wien | Loan return | 30 June 2022 | |
| 30 | FW | (Turkey) Ali Akman | (Netherlands) NEC Nijmegen | Loan return | 1 July 2022 | |
| 21 | FW | (Argentina) Lucas Alario | (Germany) Bayer Leverkusen | €6.0 million | 1 July 2022 | |
| 11 | FW | (Germany) Faride Alidou | (Germany) Hamburger SV | Free transfer | 1 July 2022 | |
| 24 | DF | (Portugal) Aurélio Buta | (Belgium) Antwerp | Free transfer | 1 July 2022 | |
| 27 | MF | (Germany) Mario Götze | (Netherlands) PSV Eindhoven | €4.0 million | 1 July 2022 | |
| 23 | MF | (Norway) Jens Petter Hauge | (Italy) Milan | €12.0 million | 1 July 2022 | |
| 6 | MF | (Croatia) Kristijan Jakić | (Croatia) Dinamo Zagreb | €3.0 million | 1 July 2022 | |
| 42 | MF | (Germany) Mehdi Loune | (Germany) Eintracht Frankfurt academy | Free | 1 July 2022 | |
| 9 | FW | (France) Randal Kolo Muani | (France) Nantes | Free transfer | 1 July 2022 | |
| 4 | DF | (Cameroon) Jérôme Onguéné | (Austria) Red Bull Salzburg | Free transfer | 1 July 2022 | |
| | MF | (Germany) Fynn Otto | (Germany) Hallescher FC | Loan return | 1 July 2022 | |
| 5 | DF | (Croatia) Hrvoje Smolčić | (Croatia) Rijeka | €2.5 million | 1 July 2022 | |
| 28 | MF | (Germany) Marcel Wenig | (Germany) Bayern Munich academy | Free transfer | 1 July 2022 | |
| 33 | DF | (Italy) Luca Pellegrini | (Italy) Juventus | Loan | 12 August 2022 | |
| 26 | MF | (France) Éric Junior Dina Ebimbe | (France) Paris Saint-Germain | Loan | 21 August 2022 | |
| 30 | MF | (United States) Paxten Aaronson | (United States) Philadelphia Union | €4.0 million | 1 January 2023 | |
| 41 | GK | (Albania) Simon Simoni | (Albania) Dinamo Tirana | €600,000 | 1 January 2023 | |
| 32 | DF | (Germany) Philipp Max | (Netherlands) PSV Eindhoven | Loan | 31 January 2023 | |

=== Out ===
| No. | Pos. | Player | Transferred to | Fee | Date | Source |
|---|---|---|---|---|---|---|
| | DF | (Germany) Dominik Kohr | (Germany) Mainz 05 | €3.0 million | 30 June 2022 | |
| | MF | (Uruguay) Rodrigo Zalazar | (Germany) Schalke 04 | €2.0 million | 30 June 2022 | |
| 11 | MF | (Switzerland) Steven Zuber | (Greece) AEK Athens | €1.6 million | 30 June 2022 | |
| 21 | FW | (Germany) Ragnar Ache | (Germany) Greuther Fürth | Loan | 1 July 2022 | |
| 27 | MF | (Morocco) Aymen Barkok | (Germany) Mainz 05 | Free transfer | 1 July 2022 | |
| | MF | (Germany) Elias Bördner | (Germany) Viktoria Köln | Undisclosed | 1 July 2022 | |
| 24 | DF | (Germany) Danny da Costa | (Germany) Mainz 05 | Free transfer | 1 July 2022 | |
| 37 | DF | (Germany) Erik Durm | (Germany) 1. FC Kaiserslautern | Undisclosed | 1 July 2022 | |
| 46 | MF | (Cyprus) Antonio Foti | (Germany) Hannover 96 | Loan | 1 July 2022 | |
| 38 | MF | (Spain) Enrique Herrero | (Spain) Real Madrid academy | Undisclosed | 1 July 2022 | |
| 13 | DF | (Austria) Martin Hinteregger | (Austria) SGA Sirnitz | Free | 1 July 2022 | |
| 3 | MF | (Austria) Stefan Ilsanker | (Italy) Genoa | Free transfer | 1 July 2022 | |
| 9 | FW | (Netherlands) Sam Lammers | (Italy) Atalanta | Loan return | 1 July 2022 | |
| | DF | (Germany) Fynn Otto | (Germany) Eintracht Frankfurt II | Free | 1 July 2022 | |
| | MF | (Slovenia) Martin Pečar | Austria Wien | Undisclosed | 1 July 2022 | |
| 48 | FW | (Germany) Gianluca Schäfer | (Germany) Eintracht Frankfurt II | Free | 1 July 2022 | |
| 7 | MF | (Australia) Ajdin Hrustić | (Italy) Hellas Verona | €500,000 | 1 August 2022 | |
| 39 | FW | (Portugal) Gonçalo Paciência | (Spain) Celta Vigo | Undisclosed | 6 August 2022 | |
| 30 | FW | (Turkey) Ali Akman | (Turkey) Göztepe | Loan | 7 August 2022 | |
| 10 | MF | (Serbia) Filip Kostić | (Italy) Juventus | €12.0 million | 12 August 2022 | |
| 23 | MF | (Norway) Jens Petter Hauge | (Belgium) Gent | Loan | 16 August 2022 | |
| 4 | DF | (Cameroon) Jérôme Onguéné | (Austria) Red Bull Salzburg | Loan | 5 January 2023 | |
| 33 | DF | (Italy) Luca Pellegrini | (Italy) Lazio | Loan resolved and loaned on | 31 January 2023 | |

== Friendly matches ==
Win Draw Loss

| 2 July 2022 | SV Nieder-Weisel (Germany) | 0–14 | (Germany) Eintracht Frankfurt | Butzbach, Germany |
| 14:30 CEST (UTC+2) | | Report | Kolo Muani 1', 19', 39'; Lindstrøm 27'; Alario 31'; Ndicka 45'; Ferri 52'; Paciência 54', 87', 90'; 59' (o.g.); 64' (o.g.); Alidou 70'; Maqkaj 82' | Stadium: Sportanlage Wiesengrund; Attendance: 3,000 |

| 5 July 2022 | Viktoria Aschaffenburg (Germany) | 0–1 | (Germany) Eintracht Frankfurt | Aschaffenburg, Germany |
| 18:30 CEST (UTC+2) | Boutakhrit (yellow card) 38' | Report | Ndicka 27' | Stadium: Stadion am Schönbusch; Attendance: 6,620 |

| 9 July 2022 | LASK (Austria) | 0–0 | (Germany) Eintracht Frankfurt | Pasching, Austria |
| 15:00 CEST (UTC+2) | | Report | | Stadium: Waldstadion; Attendance: 6,000; Referee: Manuel Schüttengruber |

| 15 July 2022 | Eintracht Frankfurt (Germany) | 3–1 | (Italy) Torino | Bad Wimsbach, Austria |
| 14:30 CEST (UTC+2) | Touré 9'; Lindstrøm 47'; Alario 63' | Report | Horváth 83' | Stadium: Hofmaninger-Stadion; Attendance: 1,500 |

| 23 July 2022 | Eintracht Frankfurt (Germany) | Cancelled | (Netherlands) Ajax | Grödig, Austria |
| 15:00 CEST (UTC+2) | | | | Stadium: Untersberg-Arena |
Note: The match was called off due to several positive COVID-19 cases in the Ajax squad.

| 27 July 2022 | FC Astoria Walldorf (Germany) | 0–5 | (Germany) Eintracht Frankfurt | Walldorf, Germany |
| 18:00 CEST (UTC+2) | Hauk (yellow card) 55'; Becker (yellow card) 64'; Hauswirth (yellow card) 79' | Report | Lindstrøm 1'; Kostić 11'; Borré 23'; Jakić 83'; Alario 86' | Stadium: FC-Astoria Stadion; Attendance: 2,500 |

| 16 November 2022 | Urawa Red Diamonds (Japan) | 4–2 | (Germany) Eintracht Frankfurt | Saitama, Japan |
| 19:30 JST (UTC+9) | Junker 19', 27'; Scholz 50'; Matsuo 78' | Report | Alaoui 47'; Ferri 81' | Stadium: Saitama Stadium 2002; Attendance: 24,027 |

| 19 November 2022 | Gamba Osaka (Japan) | 2–1 | (Germany) Eintracht Frankfurt | Osaka, Japan |
| 14:00 JST (UTC+9) | Yamami 81' (pen.); Yamamoto 88' | Report | Tuta 38' | Stadium: Panasonic Stadium Suita; Attendance: 16,000 |

| 2 December 2022 | Eintracht Frankfurt (Germany) | 5–1 | (Germany) SV Sandhausen | Frankfurt, Germany |
| 13:30 CET (UTC+1) | Borré 7', 77'; Alario 27'; Tuta 48'; Alidou 49' | Report | Đumić 84' | Stadium: Deutsche Bank Park, side pitch |

| 9 December 2022 Trofeo Bortolotti | Atalanta (Italy) | 2–2 (a.e.t.) (3–5 p) | (Germany) Eintracht Frankfurt | Bergamo, Italy |
| 20:00 CET (UTC+1) | Lookman 15'; Højlund 50'; Zortea (yellow card) 88' | Report | Alario 43', 48'; Borré (yellow card) 82' | Stadium: Stadio Atleti Azzurri d'Italia; Attendance: 9,000; Referee: Alessandro Prontera (Italy) |
| | Penalties |
| | Tolói (penalty missed); Zapata (penalty scored); Éderson (penalty scored); Scalvini (penalty scored) | | (penalty scored) Pellegrini; (penalty scored) Ndicka; (penalty scored) Dina Ebimbe; (penalty scored) Alario; (penalty scored) Borré |

| 7 January 2023 | Eintracht Frankfurt (Germany) | 4–2 | (Germany) RB Leipzig | Dubai, United Arab Emirates |
| | Lindstrøm 7'; Borré 70'; Kolo Muani 72', 84' | Report | Silva 35', 45' | Stadium: NAS Sports Complex; Attendance: 0 |
Note: The match was played behind closed doors.

| 13 January 2023 | Eintracht Frankfurt (Germany) | 1-0 | (Poland) Lech Poznań | United Arab Emirates |
| 13:00 GST (UTC+04:00) | Kamada 51' | Report | | Attendance: 0 |
Note: The match was played behind closed doors.

| 13 January 2023 | Eintracht Frankfurt (Germany) | 2–2 | (Poland) Lech Poznań | United Arab Emirates |
| 15:00 GST (UTC+04:00) | Sobiech 10'; Kvekveskiri 22' | Report | Alario 40'; Buta 78' | Attendance: 0 |
Note: The match was played behind closed doors.

| 23 March 2023 | Eintracht Frankfurt (Germany) | 1–1 | (Germany) Greuther Fürth | Frankfurt, Germany |
| 14:00 CET (UTC+1) | Alario 50' | Report | Hrgota (yellow card) 32'; Ache 54' | Stadium: Deutsche Bank Park, side pitch Attendance: 0 Referee: Mario Hildenbrand |
Note: The match was played behind closed doors.

== Competitions ==
Win Draw Loss

=== Overall record ===
| Competition | First match | Last match | Starting round | Final position | Record | | | | | | | |
| Competition | First match | Last match | Starting round | Final position | Pld | W | D | L | GF | GA | GD | Win % |
|---|---|---|---|---|---|---|---|---|---|---|---|---|
| Bundesliga | 5 August 2022 | 27 May 2023 | Matchday 1 | 7th | 34 | 13 | 11 | 10 | 58 | 52 | +6 | 38.24 |
| DFB-Pokal | 1 August 2022 | 3 June 2023 | First round | Runners-up | 6 | 5 | 0 | 1 | 15 | 6 | +9 | 83.33 |
| UEFA Champions League | 7 September 2022 | 15 March 2023 | Group stage | Round of 16 | 8 | 3 | 1 | 4 | 7 | 13 | −6 | 37.50 |
| UEFA Super Cup | 10 August 2022 | | Final | Runners-up | 1 | 0 | 0 | 1 | 0 | 2 | −2 | 0.00 |
| Total | | | | | 49 | 21 | 12 | 16 | 80 | 73 | +7 | 42.86 |

Source: Soccerway

=== Bundesliga ===
==== League table ====
| Pos | Team | Pld | W | D | L | GF | GA | GD | Pts | Qualification or relegation |
|---|---|---|---|---|---|---|---|---|---|---|
| 5 | SC Freiburg | 34 | 17 | 8 | 9 | 51 | 44 | +7 | 59 | Qualification for the Europa League group stage (Note: Since the 2022–23 DFB-Pokal winners, RB Leipzig, qualified for the Champions League based on league position, the Europa League group stage spot was passed to the sixth-placed team, and the Europa Conference League play-off round spot was passed to the seventh-placed team.) |
| 6 | Bayer Leverkusen | 34 | 14 | 8 | 12 | 57 | 49 | +8 | 50 | Qualification for the Europa League group stage |
| 7 | Eintracht Frankfurt | 34 | 13 | 11 | 10 | 58 | 52 | +6 | 50 | Qualification for the Europa Conference League play-off round |
| 8 | VfL Wolfsburg | 34 | 13 | 10 | 11 | 57 | 48 | +9 | 49 | |
| 9 | Mainz 05 | 34 | 12 | 10 | 12 | 54 | 55 | −1 | 46 | |

Source: DFB
Rules for classification: 1) Points; 2) Goal difference; 3) Goals scored; 4) Head-to-head results; 5) Head-to-head away goals scored; 6) Away goals scored; 7) Play-off.

==== Results summary ====
| Overall | | | | | | | | Home | | | | | | Away | | | | | |
| Pld | W | D | L | GF | GA | GD | Pts | W | D | L | GF | GA | GD | W | D | L | GF | GA | GD |
|---|---|---|---|---|---|---|---|---|---|---|---|---|---|---|---|---|---|---|---|
| 34 | 13 | 11 | 10 | 58 | 52 | +6 | 50 | 9 | 5 | 3 | 34 | 17 | +17 | 4 | 6 | 7 | 24 | 35 | −11 |

Source: Bundesliga

==== Results by round ====
| Round | 1 | 2 | 3 | 4 | 5 | 6 | 7 | 8 | 9 | 10 | 11 | 12 | 13 | 14 | 15 | 16 | 17 | 18 | 19 | 20 | 21 | 22 | 23 | 24 | 25 | 26 | 27 | 28 | 29 | 30 | 31 | 32 | 33 | 34 |
|---|---|---|---|---|---|---|---|---|---|---|---|---|---|---|---|---|---|---|---|---|---|---|---|---|---|---|---|---|---|---|---|---|---|---|
| Ground | H | A | H | A | H | H | A | H | A | H | A | H | A | H | A | H | A | A | H | A | H | A | A | H | A | H | A | H | A | H | A | H | A | H |
| Result | L | D | D | W | W | L | W | W | L | W | W | L | W | W | D | W | D | D | W | L | W | L | D | D | L | D | L | D | L | D | L | W | D | W |
| Position | 18 | 16 | 15 | 11 | 10 | 11 | 7 | 6 | 8 | 5 | 4 | 5 | 5 | 4 | 4 | 2 | 4 | 6 | 5 | 6 | 6 | 6 | 6 | 6 | 6 | 6 | 7 | 7 | 9 | 9 | 9 | 8 | 8 | 7 |

Source: DFB
A = Away; H = Home; W = Win; D = Draw; L = Loss

==== Matches ====
| 5 August 2022 1 | Eintracht Frankfurt | 1–6 | Bayern Munich | Frankfurt |
| 20:30 CEST (UTC+2) | Ndicka (yellow card) 59'; Kolo Muani 64'; Kostić (yellow card) 71' | Report | Kimmich 5'; Pavard 11'; Mané 29'; Musiala 35', 83'; Gnabry 43' | Stadium: Deutsche Bank Park; Attendance: 51,500; Referee: Deniz Aytekin |

| 13 August 2022 2 | Hertha BSC | 1–1 | Eintracht Frankfurt | Berlin |
| 15:30 CEST (UTC+2) | Serdar 3', (yellow card) 85'; Mittelstädt (yellow card) 33'; Šunjić (yellow card) 57' | Report | Kamada 48'; Sow (yellow card) 58' | Stadium: Olympiastadion; Attendance: 44,694; Referee: Frank Willenborg |

| 21 August 2022 3 | Eintracht Frankfurt | 1–1 | 1. FC Köln | Frankfurt |
| 15:30 CEST (UTC+2) | Kamada 71' | Report | Dietz (yellow card) 58'; Thielmann 82' | Stadium: Deutsche Bank Park; Attendance: 50,800; Referee: Martin Petersen |

| 28 August 2022 4 | Werder Bremen | 3–4 | Eintracht Frankfurt | Bremen |
| 17:30 CEST (UTC+2) | Jung 14'; Bittencourt 17'; Pieper (yellow card) 33'; Füllkrug 90+2' | Report | Götze 2'; Kolo Muani 32'; Lindstrøm 39'; Sow 48', (yellow card) 90+3'; Trapp (yellow card) 75'; Knauff (yellow card) 90+6' | Stadium: Weserstadion; Attendance: 41,000; Referee: Patrick Ittrich |

| 3 September 2022 5 | Eintracht Frankfurt | 4–0 | RB Leipzig | Frankfurt |
| 18:30 CEST (UTC+2) | Kamada 16'; Rode 22'; Sow (yellow card) 33'; Tuta 67'; Borré 84' (pen.) | Report | Henrichs (yellow card) 60' | Stadium: Deutsche Bank Park; Attendance: 49,700; Referee: Felix Brych |

| 10 September 2022 6 | Eintracht Frankfurt | 0–1 | VfL Wolfsburg | Frankfurt |
| 15:30 CEST (UTC+2) | Sow (yellow card) 15'; Tuta (yellow card) 62' | Report | Otávio (yellow card) 10'; Svanberg (yellow card) 52'; Lacroix 60'; L. Nmecha (yellow card) 86'; Arnold (yellow card) 90+1' | Stadium: Deutsche Bank Park; Attendance: 49,000; Referee: Tobias Reichel |

| 17 September 2022 7 | VfB Stuttgart | 1–3 | Eintracht Frankfurt | Stuttgart |
| 15:30 CEST (UTC+2) | Karazor (yellow card) 31'; Mavropanos (yellow card) 53'; Tomás 79' | Report | Rode 6'; Kamada 55'; Jakić 88' | Stadium: Mercedes-Benz Arena; Attendance: 47,500; Referee: Daniel Siebert |

| 1 October 2022 8 | Eintracht Frankfurt | 2–0 | Union Berlin | Frankfurt |
| 15:30 CEST (UTC+2) | Götze 12'; Lindstrøm 42'; Kolo Muani (yellow card) 43' (yellow-red card) 68'; Rode (yellow card) 57' | Report | Becker (yellow card) 19'; Khedira (yellow card) 65'; Michel (yellow card) 74'; Giesselmann (yellow card) 77' | Stadium: Deutsche Bank Park; Attendance: 50,500; Referee: Sascha Stegemann |

| 8 October 2022 9 | VfL Bochum | 3–0 | Eintracht Frankfurt | Bochum |
| 15:30 CEST (UTC+2) | Zoller (yellow card) 40'; Ordets (yellow card) 54'; Hofmann 71'; Ndicka 87' (o.g.); Förster 90+1' | Report | Dina Ebimbe (yellow card) 57' | Stadium: Ruhrstadion; Attendance: 24,850; Referee: Martin Petersen |

| 15 October 2022 10 | Eintracht Frankfurt | 5–1 | Bayer Leverkusen | Frankfurt |
| 15:30 CEST (UTC+2) | Kamada 45+5' (pen.), 72' (pen.); Kolo Muani 58'; Lindstrøm 65'; Alario 86' | Report | Andrich (yellow card) 11'; Hincapié (yellow card) 42' (yellow-red card) 76', (goal) 56'; Tapsoba (yellow card) 45' | Stadium: Deutsche Bank Park; Attendance: 49,700; Referee: Frank Willenborg |

| 22 October 2022 11 | Borussia Mönchengladbach | 1–3 | Eintracht Frankfurt | Mönchengladbach |
| 18:30 CEST (UTC+2) | Koné (yellow card) 16'; Weigl (yellow card) 18'; Kramer (yellow card) 46'; Thuram 72' | Report | Lindstrøm 6', 45'; Kamada (yellow card) 25'; Dina Ebimbe 29'; Jakić (yellow card) 31' | Stadium: Borussia-Park; Attendance: 53,019; Referee: Daniel Siebert |

| 29 October 2022 12 | Eintracht Frankfurt | 1–2 | Borussia Dortmund | Frankfurt |
| 18:30 CEST (UTC+2) | Pellegrini (yellow card) 16'; Kamada 26'; Lindstrøm (yellow card) 59'; Rode (yellow card) 90+2'; Tuta (yellow card) 90+5'; Trapp (yellow card) 90+5' | Report | Brandt 20'; Bellingham 52', (yellow card) 90+5'; Özcan (yellow card) 66'; Can (yellow card) 70'; Hummels (yellow card) 81'; Reyna (yellow card) 90+5' | Stadium: Deutsche Bank Park; Attendance: 50,000; Referee: Sascha Stegemann |

| 5 November 2022 13 | FC Augsburg | 1–2 | Eintracht Frankfurt | Augsburg |
| 15:30 CET (UTC+1) | Berisha 1' | Report | Rode 13'; Knauff 64'; Ndicka (yellow card) 71' | Stadium: Augsburg Arena; Attendance: 30,087; Referee: Deniz Aytekin |

| 9 November 2022 14 | Eintracht Frankfurt | 4–2 | 1899 Hoffenheim | Frankfurt |
| 20:30 CET (UTC+1) | Sow 6'; Kolo Muani 8'; Dina Ebimbe 29'; Lindstrøm 56' | Report | Baumgartner 37', (yellow card) 80'; Kabak 46'; Vogt (yellow card) 78'; Geiger (yellow card) 86' | Stadium: Deutsche Bank Park; Attendance: 49,000; Referee: Felix Zwayer |

| 13 November 2022 15 | Mainz 05 | 1–1 | Eintracht Frankfurt | Mainz |
| 15:30 CET (UTC+1) | Burkardt 40'; Bell (yellow card) 45+1'; Martín (yellow card) 58' | Report | Tuta (yellow card) 38'; Kolo Muani 67', (yellow card) 75' | Stadium: Mewa Arena; Attendance: 33,305; Referee: Robert Schröder |

| 21 January 2023 16 | Eintracht Frankfurt | 3–0 | Schalke 04 | Frankfurt |
| 15:30 CET (UTC+1) | Lindstrøm 21'; Borré (yellow card) 78', (goal) 84'; Götze (yellow card) 88'; Buta 90+1' | Report | Bülter (yellow card) 58'; Krauß (yellow card) 67'; Uronen (yellow card) 86' | Stadium: Deutsche Bank Park; Attendance: 50,000; Referee: Marco Fritz |

| 25 January 2023 17 | SC Freiburg | 1–1 | Eintracht Frankfurt | Freiburg |
| 20:30 CET (UTC+1) | Eggestein (yellow card) 22'; Ginter 47'; Höfler (yellow card) 58'; Keitel (yellow card) 90+3' | Report | Kamada (yellow card) 22'; Kolo Muani 42'; Ndicka (yellow card) 59'; Lindstrøm (yellow card) 67' | Stadium: Europa-Park Stadion; Attendance: 34,700; Referee: Deniz Aytekin |

| 28 January 2023 18 | Bayern Munich | 1–1 | Eintracht Frankfurt | Munich |
| 18:30 CET (UTC+1) | De Ligt (yellow card) 8'; Sommer (yellow card) 25'; Sané 34'; Upamecano (yellow card) 56' | Report | Kolo Muani 69'; Borré (yellow card) 80' | Stadium: Allianz Arena; Attendance: 75,000; Referee: Sven Jablonski |

| 4 February 2023 19 | Eintracht Frankfurt | 3–0 | Hertha BSC | Frankfurt |
| 15:30 CET (UTC+1) | Kolo Muani 21' (pen.), 28'; Tuta (yellow card) 63'; Buta 90+3' | Report | Niederlechner (yellow card) 22'; Mittelstädt (yellow card) 57' | Stadium: Deutsche Bank Park; Attendance: 49,500; Referee: Robert Hartmann |

| 12 February 2023 20 | 1. FC Köln | 3–0 | Eintracht Frankfurt | Cologne |
| 17:30 CET (UTC+1) | Martel (yellow card) 28'; Hübers 49', (yellow card) 68'; Skhiri 71', 86'; Chabot (yellow card) 79' | Report | Buta (yellow card) 45'; Götze (yellow card) 61' | Stadium: RheinEnergieStadion; Attendance: 50,000; Referee: Daniel Siebert |

| 18 February 2023 21 | Eintracht Frankfurt | 2–0 | Werder Bremen | Frankfurt |
| 18:30 CET (UTC+1) | Friedl 8' (pen.); Kolo Muani 52'; Max (yellow card) 57' | Report | Stark (yellow card) 40' | Stadium: Deutsche Bank Park; Attendance: 50,000; Referee: Bastian Dankert |

| 25 February 2023 22 | RB Leipzig | 2–1 | Eintracht Frankfurt | Leipzig |
| 15:30 CET (UTC+1) | Werner 6'; Orban (yellow card) 33'; Forsberg 40'; Laimer (yellow card) 84' | Report | Rode (yellow card) 57'; Sow 61', (yellow card) 76'; Hasebe (yellow card) 84' | Stadium: Red Bull Arena; Attendance: 47,069; Referee: Felix Brych |

| 5 March 2023 23 | VfL Wolfsburg | 2–2 | Eintracht Frankfurt | Wolfsburg |
| 17:30 CET (UTC+1) | Marmoush 10'; Gerhardt 43'; Wimmer (yellow card) 48'; Otávio (yellow card) 84'; Arnold (yellow card) 84' | Report | Kolo Muani 22'; Ndicka 26'; Götze (yellow card) 45+4'; Rode (yellow card) 58'; Jakić (yellow card) 84' | Stadium: Volkswagen Arena; Attendance: 27,853; Referee: Daniel Schlager |

| 11 March 2023 24 | Eintracht Frankfurt | 1–1 | VfB Stuttgart | Frankfurt |
| 15:30 CET (UTC+1) | Rode (yellow card) 27', (goal) 55'; Sow (yellow card) 75'; Götze (yellow card) 90'; Ndicka (yellow card) 90+3' | Report | Coulibaly (yellow card) 72'; Silas 75' | Stadium: Deutsche Bank Park; Attendance: 50,000; Referee: Robert Hartmann |

| 19 March 2023 25 | Union Berlin | 2–0 | Eintracht Frankfurt | Berlin |
| 15:30 CET (UTC+1) | Khedira 53'; Doekhi (yellow card) 60'; Behrens 75'; Roussillon (yellow card) 77'; Rønnow (yellow card) 90+1' | Report | Tuta (yellow card) 57'; Kolo Muani (yellow card) 83' | Stadium: Stadion An der Alten Försterei; Attendance: 22,012; Referee: Christian Dingert |

| 31 March 2023 26 | Eintracht Frankfurt | 1–1 | VfL Bochum | Frankfurt |
| 20:30 CEST (UTC+2) | Sow (yellow card) 4'; Kolo Muani 22' (pen.); Borré (yellow card) 71'; Jakić (yellow card) 81' | Report | Losilla (yellow card) 6'; Asano 14'; Ordets (yellow card) 21' | Stadium: Deutsche Bank Park; Attendance: 51,500; Referee: Harm Osmers |

| 8 April 2023 27 | Bayer Leverkusen | 3–1 | Eintracht Frankfurt | Leverkusen |
| 15:30 CEST (UTC+2) | Adli 10'; Diaby 34'; Tapsoba (yellow card) 44'; Azmoun 90+5' | Report | Götze (yellow card) 42'; Borré (yellow card) 45+1'; Knauff (yellow card) 48'; Sow 74'; Dina Ebimbe (yellow card) 89'; Jakić (yellow card) 90+1' | Stadium: BayArena; Attendance: 30,210; Referee: Robert Hartmann |

| 15 April 2023 28 | Eintracht Frankfurt | 1–1 | Borussia Mönchengladbach | Frankfurt |
| 18:30 CEST (UTC+2) | Kamada (yellow card) 68'; Kolo Muani 83' | Report | Hofmann 13'; Stindl (yellow card) 77'; Koné (yellow card) 86' | Stadium: Deutsche Bank Park; Attendance: 50,000; Referee: Sven Jablonski |

| 22 April 2023 29 | Borussia Dortmund | 4–0 | Eintracht Frankfurt | Dortmund |
| 18:30 CEST (UTC+2) | Bellingham 19', (yellow card) 54'; Malen 24', 66'; Hummels 41'; Adeyemi (yellow card) 62' | Report | Lenz (yellow card) 13'; Kolo Muani (yellow card) 23'; Rode (yellow card) 49' | Stadium: Westfalenstadion; Attendance: 81,365; Referee: Deniz Aytekin |

| 29 April 2023 30 | Eintracht Frankfurt | 1–1 | FC Augsburg | Frankfurt |
| 15:30 CEST (UTC+2) | Rexhbecaj 25' (o.g.); Dina Embimbe (yellow card) 61'; Tuta (yellow card) 79' | Report | Veiga (yellow card) 20'; Demirović 58', (yellow card) 61' | Stadium: Deutsche Bank Park; Attendance: 48,000; Referee: Frank Willenborg |

| 6 May 2023 31 | 1899 Hoffenheim | 3–1 | Eintracht Frankfurt | Hoffenheim |
| 15:30 CEST (UTC+2) | Baumgartner 8'; Kramarić 15' (pen.), (yellow card) 67'; Bebou 45+3'; Nsoki (red card) 48'; Baumann (yellow card) 84' | Report | Touré (yellow card) 15'; Götze (yellow card) 41', (goal) 54'; Trapp (yellow card) 44'; Borré (yellow card) 62' | Stadium: Rhein-Neckar-Arena; Attendance: 30,000; Referee: Harm Osmers |

| 13 May 2023 32 | Eintracht Frankfurt | 3–0 | Mainz 05 | Frankfurt |
| 15:30 CEST (UTC+2) | Kamada 18' (pen.); Tuta (yellow card) 30'; Buta 40'; Kolo Muani 59' | Report | Bell (yellow card) 22'; Hanche-Olsen (yellow card) 38'; Shabani (yellow card) 88' | Stadium: Deutsche Bank Park; Attendance: 50,000; Referee: Felix Brych |

| 20 May 2022 33 | Schalke 04 | 2–2 | Eintracht Frankfurt | Gelsenkirchen |
| 15:30 CEST (UTC+2) | Terodde 1', (yellow card) 40'; Krauß (yellow card) 39'; Jenz (yellow card) 44'; Polter 85' | Report | Sow (yellow card) 6'; Kamada 21'; Buta (yellow card) 32'; Kolo Muani (yellow card) 44'; Tuta 59', (yellow card) 90+4' | Stadium: Arena AufSchalke; Attendance: 61,575; Referee: Daniel Schlager |

| 27 May 2023 34 | Eintracht Frankfurt | 2–1 | SC Freiburg | Frankfurt |
| 15:30 CEST (UTC+2) | Sow (yellow card) 45+3'; Buta (yellow card) 65'; Kolo Muani 83'; Dina Ebimbe 90+1', (yellow card) 90+2'; Aaronson (yellow card) 90+6' | Report | Grifo 44'; Schmidt (yellow card) 34'; Eggestein (yellow card) 83' | Stadium: Deutsche Bank Park; Attendance: 50,500; Referee: Deniz Aytekin |

=== DFB-Pokal ===
| 1 August 2022 First round | 1. FC Magdeburg | 0–4 | Eintracht Frankfurt | Magdeburg |
| 20:46 CEST (UTC+2) | Sechelmann (yellow card) 81' | Report | Kamada 4', 59'; Lindstrøm 31'; Jakić (yellow card) 86'; Alario 90' | Stadium: MDCC-Arena; Attendance: 26,350; Referee: Felix Zwayer |

| 18 October 2022 Second round | Stuttgarter Kickers | 0–2 | Eintracht Frankfurt | Stuttgart |
| 18:00 CEST (UTC+2) | Campagna (yellow card) 63'; Kammerbauer (yellow card) 89' | Report | Kolo Muani 11'; Smolčić 17'; Smolčić (yellow card) 88' | Stadium: Gazi-Stadion auf der Waldau; Attendance: 10,000; Referee: Deniz Aytekin |

| 7 February 2023 Round of 16 | Eintracht Frankfurt | 4–2 | Darmstadt 98 | Frankfurt |
| 20:45 CET (UTC+1) | Kolo Muani 6', 90'; Borré (yellow card) 34', (goal) 44'; Ndicka (yellow card) 45+5'; Tuta (yellow card) 48'; Kamada 62'; Rode (yellow card) 64' | Report | Honsak 29', 31'; Holland (yellow card) 34'; Müller (yellow card) 45+3'; Kempe (yellow card) 80'; Manu (yellow card) 83'; Bennetts (yellow card) 90+6' | Stadium: Deutsche Bank Park; Attendance: 49,500; Referee: Felix Zwayer |

| 4 April 2023 Quarter-finals | Eintracht Frankfurt | 2–0 | Union Berlin | Frankfurt |
| 18:00 CEST (UTC+2) | Kolo Muani 11', 13' | Report | | Stadium: Deutsche Bank Park; Attendance: 50,000; Referee: Bastian Dankert |

| 3 May 2023 Semi-finals | VfB Stuttgart | 2–3 | Eintracht Frankfurt | Stuttgart |
| 20:45 CEST (UTC+2) | Guirassy (yellow card) 9'; Tomás 19', (yellow card) 20'; Bredlow (yellow card) 75'; Ito (yellow card) 80'; Sosa (yellow card) 80' (yellow-red card) 86'; Millot 83' | Report | Götze (yellow card) 4'; Sow (yellow card) 5'; Ndicka 51'; Kamada 55'; Kolo Muani 77' (pen.); Buta (yellow card) 90+2'; Lenz (yellow card) 90+3' | Stadium: Mercedes-Benz Arena; Attendance: 47,500; Referee: Daniel Schlager |

| 3 June 2023 Final | RB Leipzig | 2–0 | Eintracht Frankfurt | Berlin |
| 20:00 CEST (UTC+2) | Nkunku 71', (yellow card) 90+1'; Laimer (yellow card) 81'; Szoboszlai 85' | Report | Götze (yellow card) 77'; Kolo Muani (yellow card) 90+2' | Stadium: Olympiastadion; Attendance: 74,322; Referee: Daniel Siebert |

=== UEFA Super Cup ===
| 10 August 2022 Final | Real Madrid (Spain) | 2–0 | (Germany) Eintracht Frankfurt | Helsinki, Finland |
| 22:00 EEST (UTC+3) | Alaba 37'; Benzema 65' | Report | Alario (yellow card) 90+2' | Stadium: Olympic Stadium; Attendance: 31,042; Referee: Michael Oliver (England) |

=== UEFA Champions League ===
==== Group stage ====
The group stage draw was held on 25 August 2022.

| Pos | Team | Pld | W | D | L | GF | GA | GD | Pts | Qualification | TOT | FRA | SPO | MAR |
|---|---|---|---|---|---|---|---|---|---|---|---|---|---|---|
| 1 | (England) Tottenham Hotspur | 6 | 3 | 2 | 1 | 8 | 6 | +2 | 11 | Advance to knockout phase | — | 3–2 | 1–1 | 2–0 |
| 2 | (Germany) Eintracht Frankfurt | 6 | 3 | 1 | 2 | 7 | 8 | −1 | 10 | Advance to knockout phase | 0–0 | — | 0–3 | 2–1 |
| 3 | (Portugal) Sporting CP | 6 | 2 | 1 | 3 | 8 | 9 | −1 | 7 | Transfer to Europa League | 2–0 | 1–2 | — | 0–2 |
| 4 | (France) Marseille | 6 | 2 | 0 | 4 | 8 | 8 | 0 | 6 | | 1–2 | 0–1 | 4–1 | — |

Source: UEFA
Rules for classification: Group stage tiebreakers

| 7 September 2022 1 | Eintracht Frankfurt (Germany) | 0–3 | (Portugal) Sporting CP | Frankfurt, Germany |
| 18:45 CEST (UTC+2) | Ndicka (yellow card) 38'; Jakić (yellow card) 55' | Report | Morita (yellow card) 6'; Edwards 65'; Trincão 67'; Santos 82' | Stadium: Deutsche Bank Park; Attendance: 50,500; Referee: Orel Grinfeld (Israel) |

| 13 September 2022 2 | Marseille (France) | 0–1 | (Germany) Eintracht Frankfurt | Marseille, France |
| 21:00 CEST (UTC+2) | Ünder (yellow card) 82' | Report | Hasebe (yellow card) 37'; Lindstrøm 43' | Stadium: Stade Vélodrome; Attendance: 62,500; Referee: José María Sánchez Martínez (Spain) |

| 4 October 2022 3 | Eintracht Frankfurt (Germany) | 0–0 | (England) Tottenham Hotspur | Frankfurt, Germany |
| 21:00 CEST (UTC+2) | | Report | Højbjerg (yellow card) 44'; Lenglet (yellow card) 74'; Kane (yellow card) 84' | Stadium: Deutsche Bank Park; Attendance: 50,500; Referee: Daniele Orsato (Italy) |

| 12 October 2022 4 | Tottenham Hotspur (England) | 3–2 | (Germany) Eintracht Frankfurt | London, England |
| 21:00 CEST (UTC+2) | Dier (yellow card) 12'; Son 20', 36'; Kane 28' (pen.), (penalty missed) 90+2'; Bentancur (yellow card) 40'; Sessegnon (yellow card) 84' | Report | Kamada 14'; Tuta (yellow card) 57' (yellow-red card) 60'; Hasebe (yellow card) 61'; Alidou 87'; Smolčić (yellow card) 90+1' | Stadium: Tottenham Hotspur Stadium; Attendance: 55,180; Referee: Carlos del Cerro Grande (Spain) |

| 26 October 2022 5 | Eintracht Frankfurt (Germany) | 2–1 | (France) Marseille | Frankfurt, Germany |
| 21:00 CEST (UTC+2) | Kamada 3'; Kolo Muani 27', (yellow card) 54'; Smolčić (yellow card) 57'; Dina Ebimbe (yellow card) 75' | Report | Guendouzi 22'; Tavares (yellow card) 25'; Veretout (yellow card) 40'; Suárez (yellow card) 86' | Stadium: Deutsche Bank Park; Attendance: 48,700; Referee: Jesús Gil Manzano (Spain) |

| 1 November 2022 6 | Sporting CP (Portugal) | 1–2 | (Germany) Eintracht Frankfurt | Lisbon, Portugal |
| 21:00 CEST (UTC+2) | Matheus Reis (yellow card) 35'; Arthur 39'; Paulinho (yellow card) 45+2'; Inácio (yellow card) 90+3' | Report | Jakić (yellow card) 7'; Kamada (yellow card) 14', (goal) 62' (pen.); Sow (yellow card) 58'; Kolo Muani 72'; Pellegrini (yellow card) 90+3' | Stadium: Estádio José Alvalade; Attendance: 41,744; Referee: Szymon Marciniak (Poland) |

==== Knockout phase ====
===== Round of 16 =====
The round of 16 draw was held on 7 November 2022.

| 21 February 2023 First leg | Eintracht Frankfurt (Germany) | 0–2 | (Italy) Napoli | Frankfurt, Germany |
| 21:00 CET (UTC+1) | Kolo Muani (red card) 58'; Götze (yellow card) 60' | Report | Kvaratskhelia (penalty missed) 36'; Kim (yellow card) 38'; Osimhen 40'; Di Lorenzo 65'; Elmas (yellow card) 83' | Stadium: Waldstadion; Attendance: 47,500; Referee: Artur Soares Dias (Portugal) |

| 15 March 2023 Second leg | Napoli (Italy) | 3–0 (5–0 agg.) | (Germany) Eintracht Frankfurt | Naples, Italy |
| 21:00 CET (UTC+1) | Osimhen 45+2', 53'; Zieliński 64' (pen.); Juan Jesus (yellow card) 77' | Report | Ndicka (yellow card) 26'; Lenz (yellow card) 32'; Götze (yellow card) 65' | Stadium: Stadio Diego Armando Maradona; Attendance: 49,082; Referee: Anthony Taylor (England) |

== Statistics ==
=== Appearances and goals ===
| No. | Pos | Nat | Player | Total | | Bundesliga | | DFB-Pokal | | UEFA Super Cup | | Champions League | |
| No. | Pos | Nat | Player | Apps | Goals | Apps | Goals | Apps | Goals | Apps | Goals | Apps | Goals |
Goalkeepers
| 1 | GK | (Germany) GER | Kevin Trapp | 48 | 0 | 33 | 0 | 6 | 0 | 1 | 0 | 8 | 0 |
| 31 | GK | (Germany) GER | Jens Grahl | 0 | 0 | 0 | 0 | 0 | 0 | 0 | 0 | 0 | 0 |
| 40 | GK | (Germany) GER | Diant Ramaj | 1 | 0 | 1 | 0 | 0 | 0 | 0 | 0 | 0 | 0 |
| 41 | GK | (Albania) ALB | Simon Simoni | 0 | 0 | 0 | 0 | 0 | 0 | 0 | 0 | 0 | 0 |
Defenders
| 2 | DF | (France) FRA | Evan Ndicka | 44 | 2 | 30 | 1 | 5 | 1 | 1 | 0 | 8 | 0 |
| 5 | DF | (Croatia) CRO | Hrvoje Smolčić | 14 | 1 | 4+5 | 0 | 1+1 | 1 | 0 | 0 | 1+2 | 0 |
| 18 | DF | (France) FRA | Almamy Touré | 9 | 0 | 5+2 | 0 | 1 | 0 | 1 | 0 | 0 | 0 |
| 22 | DF | (United States) USA | Timothy Chandler | 8 | 0 | 0+6 | 0 | 0+1 | 0 | 0 | 0 | 0+1 | 0 |
| 24 | DF | (Portugal) POR | Aurélio Buta | 23 | 3 | 15+3 | 3 | 3 | 0 | 0 | 0 | 2 | 0 |
| 25 | DF | (Germany) GER | Christopher Lenz | 34 | 0 | 13+11 | 0 | 2+2 | 0 | 1 | 0 | 4+1 | 0 |
| 32 | DF | (Germany) GER | Philipp Max | 15 | 0 | 8+2 | 0 | 3 | 0 | 0 | 0 | 1+1 | 0 |
| 35 | DF | (Brazil) BRA | Tuta | 43 | 2 | 30+1 | 2 | 4 | 0 | 1 | 0 | 7 | 0 |
| 46 | DF | (Germany) GER | Dario Gebuhr | 1 | 0 | 0+1 | 0 | 0 | 0 | 0 | 0 | 0 | 0 |
Midfielders
| 6 | MF | (Croatia) CRO | Kristijan Jakić | 36 | 1 | 17+7 | 1 | 2+2 | 0 | 0 | 0 | 7+1 | 0 |
| 8 | MF | (Switzerland) SUI | Djibril Sow | 47 | 4 | 30+2 | 4 | 5+1 | 0 | 1 | 0 | 8 | 0 |
| 15 | MF | (Japan) JPN | Daichi Kamada | 47 | 16 | 25+7 | 9 | 4+2 | 4 | 1 | 0 | 8 | 3 |
| 17 | MF | (Germany) GER | Sebastian Rode | 39 | 4 | 19+8 | 4 | 5 | 0 | 1 | 0 | 3+3 | 0 |
| 20 | MF | (Japan) JPN | Makoto Hasebe | 27 | 0 | 15+3 | 0 | 4+1 | 0 | 0 | 0 | 3+1 | 0 |
| 26 | MF | (France) FRA | Éric Junior Dina Ebimbe | 29 | 3 | 10+9 | 3 | 2+2 | 0 | 0 | 0 | 3+3 | 0 |
| 27 | MF | (Germany) GER | Mario Götze | 46 | 3 | 32 | 3 | 6 | 0 | 0+1 | 0 | 6+1 | 0 |
| 28 | MF | (Germany) GER | Marcel Wenig | 2 | 0 | 0+1 | 0 | 0+1 | 0 | 0 | 0 | 0 | 0 |
| 29 | MF | (Denmark) DEN | Jesper Lindstrøm | 37 | 9 | 22+5 | 7 | 1+1 | 1 | 1 | 0 | 7 | 1 |
| 30 | MF | (United States) USA | Paxten Aaronson | 8 | 0 | 0+7 | 0 | 0+1 | 0 | 0 | 0 | 0 | 0 |
| 36 | MF | (Germany) GER | Ansgar Knauff | 33 | 1 | 14+10 | 1 | 1+1 | 0 | 1 | 0 | 3+3 | 0 |
| 42 | MF | (Germany) GER | Mehdi Loune | 0 | 0 | 0 | 0 | 0 | 0 | 0 | 0 | 0 | 0 |
Forwards
| 9 | FW | (France) FRA | Randal Kolo Muani | 46 | 23 | 31+1 | 15 | 5+1 | 6 | 0+1 | 0 | 7 | 2 |
| 11 | FW | (Germany) GER | Faride Alidou | 21 | 1 | 0+15 | 0 | 0+1 | 0 | 0 | 0 | 0+5 | 1 |
| 19 | FW | (Colombia) COL | Rafael Santos Borré | 46 | 3 | 10+22 | 2 | 4+1 | 1 | 1 | 0 | 1+7 | 0 |
| 21 | FW | (Argentina) ARG | Lucas Alario | 26 | 2 | 2+18 | 1 | 0+3 | 1 | 0+1 | 0 | 0+2 | 0 |
Players transferred out during the season
| 4 | DF | (Cameroon) CMR | Jérôme Onguéné | 0 | 0 | 0 | 0 | 0 | 0 | 0 | 0 | 0 | 0 |
| 7 | MF | (Australia) AUS | Ajdin Hrustić | 0 | 0 | 0 | 0 | 0 | 0 | 0 | 0 | 0 | 0 |
| 10 | MF | (Serbia) SRB | Filip Kostić | 2 | 0 | 1 | 0 | 1 | 0 | 0 | 0 | 0 | 0 |
| 30 | FW | (Turkey) TUR | Ali Akman | 0 | 0 | 0 | 0 | 0 | 0 | 0 | 0 | 0 | 0 |
| 33 | DF | (Italy) ITA | Luca Pellegrini | 14 | 0 | 7+2 | 0 | 0+1 | 0 | 0 | 0 | 1+3 | 0 |
| 39 | FW | (Portugal) POR | Gonçalo Paciência | 0 | 0 | 0 | 0 | 0 | 0 | 0 | 0 | 0 | 0 |
| 23 | MF | (Norway) NOR | Jens Petter Hauge | 0 | 0 | 0 | 0 | 0 | 0 | 0 | 0 | 0 | 0 |

Last updated: 3 June 2023
Source: Competitions

=== Goalscorers ===
| Rank | No. | Pos | Nat | Player | Bundesliga | DFB-Pokal | UEFA Super Cup | UEFA Champions League | Total |
|---|---|---|---|---|---|---|---|---|---|
| 1 | 9 | FW | (France) | Randal Kolo Muani | 15 | 6 | 0 | 2 | 23 |
| 2 | 15 | MF | (Japan) | Daichi Kamada | 9 | 4 | 0 | 3 | 16 |
| 3 | 27 | MF | (Denmark) | Jesper Lindstrøm | 7 | 1 | 0 | 1 | 9 |
| 4 | 8 | MF | (Switzerland) | Djibril Sow | 4 | 0 | 0 | 0 | 4 |
| 4 | 17 | MF | (Germany) | Sebastian Rode | 4 | 0 | 0 | 0 | 4 |
| 6 | 19 | FW | (Colombia) | Rafael Santos Borré | 2 | 1 | 0 | 0 | 3 |
| 6 | 24 | DF | (Portugal) | Aurélio Buta | 3 | 0 | 0 | 0 | 3 |
| 6 | 26 | MF | (France) | Éric Junior Dina Ebimbe | 3 | 0 | 0 | 0 | 3 |
| 6 | 27 | MF | (Germany) | Mario Götze | 3 | 0 | 0 | 0 | 3 |
| 10 | 2 | DF | (France) | Evan Ndicka | 1 | 1 | 0 | 0 | 2 |
| 10 | 21 | FW | (Argentina) | Lucas Alario | 1 | 1 | 0 | 0 | 2 |
| 12 | 5 | DF | (Croatia) | Hrvoje Smolčić | 0 | 1 | 0 | 0 | 1 |
| 12 | 6 | MF | (Croatia) | Kristijan Jakić | 1 | 0 | 0 | 0 | 1 |
| 12 | 11 | FW | (Germany) | Faride Alidou | 0 | 0 | 0 | 1 | 1 |
| 12 | 36 | MF | (Germany) | Ansgar Knauff | 1 | 0 | 0 | 0 | 1 |
| Own goals | | | | | 1 | 0 | 0 | 0 | 1 |
| Totals | | | | | 58 | 15 | 0 | 7 | 80 |

Last updated: 3 June 2023

=== Clean sheets ===
| Rank | No. | Pos | Nat | Player | Bundesliga | DFB-Pokal | UEFA Super Cup | Champions League | Total |
|---|---|---|---|---|---|---|---|---|---|
| 1 | 1 | GK | (Germany) | Kevin Trapp | 6 | 3 | 0 | 2 | 11 |
| 2 | 40 | GK | (Germany) | Diant Ramaj | 0 | 0 | 0 | 0 | 0 |
| Totals | | | | | 6 | 3 | 0 | 2 | 11 |

Last updated: 3 June 2023

=== Disciplinary record ===
| No. | Pos | Nat | Player | Bundesliga | | | DFB-Pokal | | | UEFA Super Cup | | | Champions League | | | Total | | |
| No. | Pos | Nat | Player | Yellow card | (yellow card) (yellow-red card) | Red card | Yellow card | (yellow card) (yellow-red card) | Red card | Yellow card | (yellow card) (yellow-red card) | Red card | Yellow card | (yellow card) (yellow-red card) | Red card | Yellow card | (yellow card) (yellow-red card) | Red card |
Totals
| 1 | GK | (Germany) | Kevin Trapp | 3 | 0 | 0 | 0 | 0 | 0 | 0 | 0 | 0 | 0 | 0 | 0 | 3 | 0 | 0 |
| 2 | DF | (France) | Evan Ndicka | 4 | 0 | 0 | 1 | 0 | 0 | 1 | 0 | 0 | 2 | 0 | 0 | 8 | 0 | 0 |
| 4 | DF | (Cameroon) | Jérôme Onguéné | 0 | 0 | 0 | 0 | 0 | 0 | 0 | 0 | 0 | 0 | 0 | 0 | 0 | 0 | 0 |
| 5 | DF | (Croatia) | Hrvoje Smolčić | 0 | 0 | 0 | 0 | 0 | 0 | 1 | 0 | 0 | 2 | 0 | 0 | 3 | 0 | 0 |
| 6 | MF | (Croatia) | Kristijan Jakić | 4 | 0 | 0 | 1 | 0 | 0 | 0 | 0 | 0 | 2 | 0 | 0 | 7 | 0 | 0 |
| 7 | MF | (Australia) | Ajdin Hrustić | 0 | 0 | 0 | 0 | 0 | 0 | 0 | 0 | 0 | 0 | 0 | 0 | 0 | 0 | 0 |
| 8 | MF | (Switzerland) | Djibril Sow | 9 | 0 | 0 | 0 | 0 | 0 | 0 | 0 | 0 | 1 | 0 | 0 | 10 | 0 | 0 |
| 9 | FW | (France) | Randal Kolo Muani | 4 | 1 | 0 | 1 | 0 | 0 | 0 | 0 | 0 | 1 | 0 | 1 | 5 | 1 | 1 |
| 10 | MF | (Serbia) | Filip Kostić | 1 | 0 | 0 | 0 | 0 | 0 | 0 | 0 | 0 | 0 | 0 | 0 | 1 | 0 | 0 |
| 11 | FW | (Germany) | Faride Alidou | 0 | 0 | 0 | 0 | 0 | 0 | 0 | 0 | 0 | 0 | 0 | 0 | 0 | 0 | 0 |
| 15 | MF | (Japan) | Daichi Kamada | 3 | 0 | 0 | 0 | 0 | 0 | 0 | 0 | 0 | 1 | 0 | 0 | 4 | 0 | 0 |
| 17 | MF | (Germany) | Sebastian Rode | 6 | 0 | 0 | 1 | 0 | 0 | 0 | 0 | 0 | 0 | 0 | 0 | 7 | 0 | 0 |
| 18 | DF | (Mali) | Almamy Touré | 1 | 0 | 0 | 0 | 0 | 0 | 0 | 0 | 0 | 0 | 0 | 0 | 1 | 0 | 0 |
| 19 | FW | (Colombia) | Rafael Santos Borré | 5 | 0 | 0 | 1 | 0 | 0 | 0 | 0 | 0 | 0 | 0 | 0 | 5 | 0 | 0 |
| 20 | MF | (Japan) | Makoto Hasebe | 1 | 0 | 0 | 0 | 0 | 0 | 0 | 0 | 0 | 2 | 0 | 0 | 3 | 0 | 0 |
| 21 | FW | (Argentina) | Lucas Alario | 0 | 0 | 0 | 0 | 0 | 0 | 0 | 0 | 0 | 1 | 0 | 0 | 1 | 0 | 0 |
| 22 | DF | (United States) | Timothy Chandler | 0 | 0 | 0 | 0 | 0 | 0 | 0 | 0 | 0 | 0 | 0 | 0 | 0 | 0 | 0 |
| 23 | MF | (Norway) | Jens Petter Hauge | 0 | 0 | 0 | 0 | 0 | 0 | 0 | 0 | 0 | 0 | 0 | 0 | 0 | 0 | 0 |
| 24 | DF | (Portugal) | Aurélio Buta | 3 | 0 | 0 | 0 | 0 | 0 | 0 | 0 | 0 | 0 | 0 | 0 | 3 | 0 | 0 |
| 25 | DF | (Germany) | Christopher Lenz | 1 | 0 | 0 | 0 | 0 | 0 | 0 | 0 | 0 | 1 | 0 | 0 | 2 | 0 | 0 |
| 26 | MF | (France) | Éric Junior Dina Ebimbe | 4 | 0 | 0 | 0 | 0 | 0 | 0 | 0 | 0 | 1 | 0 | 0 | 5 | 0 | 0 |
| 27 | MF | (Germany) | Mario Götze | 6 | 0 | 0 | 2 | 0 | 0 | 0 | 0 | 0 | 2 | 0 | 0 | 10 | 0 | 0 |
| 28 | MF | (Germany) | Marcel Wenig | 0 | 0 | 0 | 0 | 0 | 0 | 0 | 0 | 0 | 0 | 0 | 0 | 0 | 0 | 0 |
| 29 | MF | (Denmark) | Jesper Lindstrøm | 2 | 0 | 0 | 0 | 0 | 0 | 0 | 0 | 0 | 0 | 0 | 0 | 2 | 0 | 0 |
| 30 | FW | (Turkey) | Ali Akman | 0 | 0 | 0 | 0 | 0 | 0 | 0 | 0 | 0 | 0 | 0 | 0 | 0 | 0 | 0 |
| 30 | MF | (United States) | Paxten Aaronson | 1 | 0 | 0 | 0 | 0 | 0 | 0 | 0 | 0 | 0 | 0 | 0 | 1 | 0 | 0 |
| 31 | GK | (Germany) | Jens Grahl | 0 | 0 | 0 | 0 | 0 | 0 | 0 | 0 | 0 | 0 | 0 | 0 | 0 | 0 | 0 |
| 32 | DF | (Germany) | Philipp Max | 1 | 0 | 0 | 0 | 0 | 0 | 0 | 0 | 0 | 0 | 0 | 0 | 1 | 0 | 0 |
| 33 | DF | (Italy) | Luca Pellegrini | 1 | 0 | 0 | 0 | 0 | 0 | 0 | 0 | 0 | 1 | 0 | 0 | 2 | 0 | 0 |
| 35 | DF | (Brazil) | Tuta | 8 | 0 | 0 | 1 | 0 | 0 | 0 | 0 | 0 | 0 | 1 | 0 | 9 | 1 | 0 |
| 36 | MF | (Germany) | Ansgar Knauff | 2 | 0 | 0 | 0 | 0 | 0 | 0 | 0 | 0 | 0 | 0 | 0 | 2 | 0 | 0 |
| 40 | GK | (Germany) | Diant Ramaj | 0 | 0 | 0 | 0 | 0 | 0 | 0 | 0 | 0 | 0 | 0 | 0 | 0 | 0 | 0 |
| 41 | GK | (Albania) | Simon Simoni | 0 | 0 | 0 | 0 | 0 | 0 | 0 | 0 | 0 | 0 | 0 | 0 | 0 | 0 | 0 |
| 42 | MF | (Germany) | Mehdi Loune | 0 | 0 | 0 | 0 | 0 | 0 | 0 | 0 | 0 | 0 | 0 | 0 | 0 | 0 | 0 |
| 46 | DF | (Germany) | Dario Gebuhr | 0 | 0 | 0 | 0 | 0 | 0 | 0 | 0 | 0 | 0 | 0 | 0 | 0 | 0 | 0 |
| 48 | FW | (Spain) | Nacho Ferri | 0 | 0 | 0 | 0 | 0 | 0 | 0 | 0 | 0 | 0 | 0 | 0 | 0 | 0 | 0 |
| 49 | DF | (Germany) | Jan Schröder | 0 | 0 | 0 | 0 | 0 | 0 | 0 | 0 | 0 | 0 | 0 | 0 | 0 | 0 | 0 |
| Totals | | | | 70 | 1 | 0 | 3 | 0 | 0 | 1 | 0 | 0 | 17 | 1 | 1 | 97 | 2 | 1 |

Last updated: 3 June 2023
