= Karimani (disambiguation) =

Karimani is a settle in Kenya.

Karimani is also a surname. Notable people with the surname include:

- Dardan Karimani (born 1998), German footballer
- Denis Karimani (born 1983), German musician and disc jockey
