= Daichi Kamada =

Japanese footballer (born 1997)

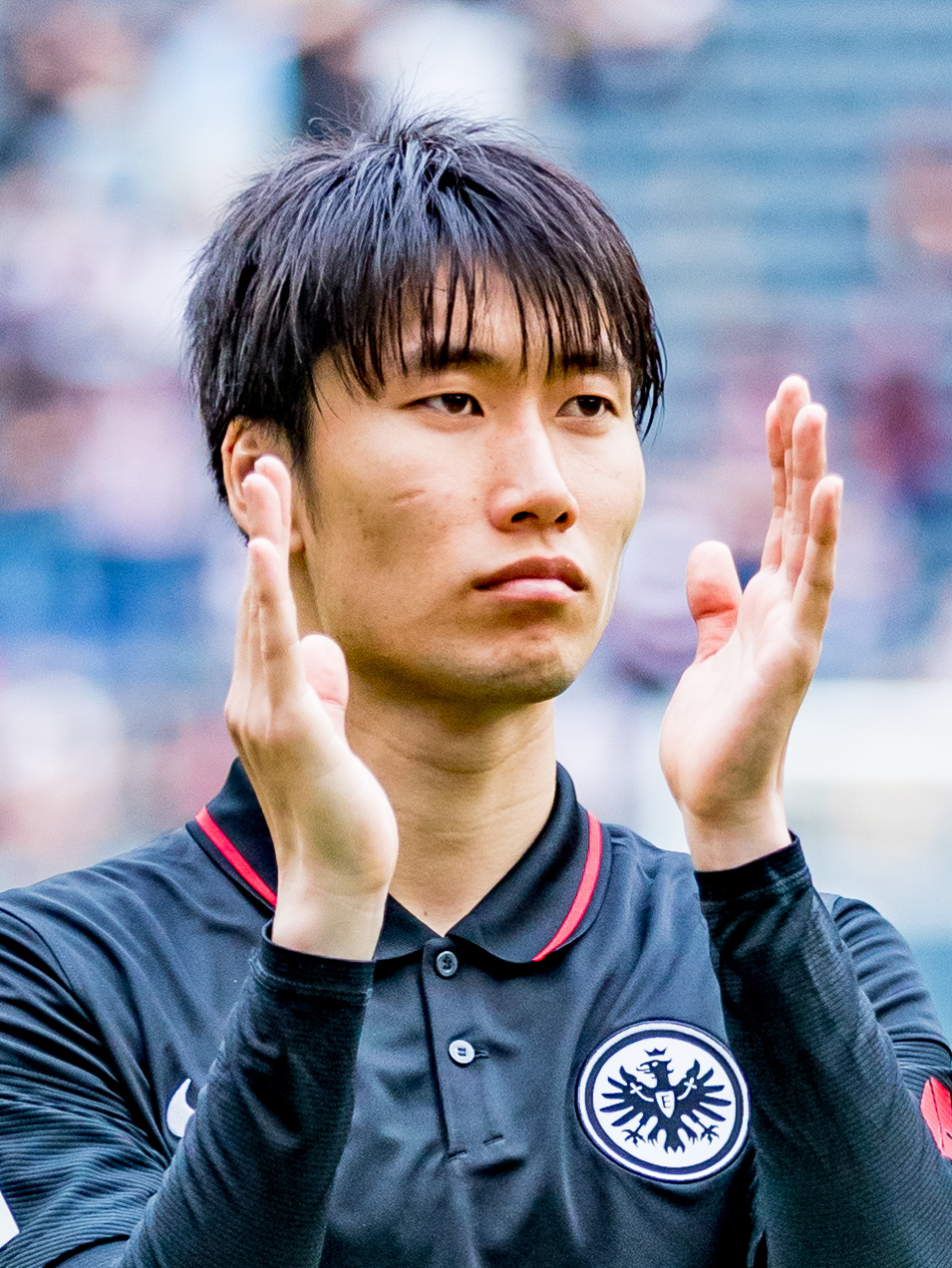
- Kamada with Eintracht Frankfurt in 2023

Personal information
- Full name: Daichi Kamada
- Date of birth: 5 August 1996 (age 30)
- Place of birth: Iyo, Ehime, Japan
- Height: 1.80 m (5 ft 11 in)
- Positions: Central midfielder; attacking midfielder

Team information
- Current team: Crystal Palace
- Number: 18

Youth career
- 1999–2008: Kids FC
- 2009–2011: Gamba Osaka
- 2012–2014: Higashiyama High School

Senior career*
| Years | Team | Apps | (Gls) |
| 2015–2017 | Sagan Tosu | 65 | (13) |
| 2015 | → J.League U-22 (loan) | 3 | (0) |
| 2017–2023 | Eintracht Frankfurt | 127 | (20) |
| 2018–2019 | → Sint-Truiden (loan) | 34 | (15) |
| 2023–2024 | Lazio | 29 | (2) |
| 2024– | Crystal Palace | 71 | (1) |

International career^{‡}
| 2016 | Japan U21 | 2 | (0) |
| 2016 | Japan U23 | 4 | (0) |
| 2019– | Japan | 58 | (14) |
- * Club domestic league appearances and goals as of 19:26, 31 October 2026 (UTC) ‡ National team caps and goals as of 14 November 2026

Daichi Kamada (鎌田 大地, Kamada Daichi; born 5 August 1996) is a Japanese professional footballer who plays as a central midfielder or attacking midfielder for Premier League club Crystal Palace and the Japan national team.

After representing several Japanese football academies in his youth, Kamada began his career at Sagan Tosu in early 2015, where he spent two and a half years. In the second half of 2017, he moved abroad to German club Eintracht Frankfurt. During his six years at the club, Kamada won the DFB-Pokal in the 2017–18 season and the UEFA Europa League in 2021–22. He was also loaned to Belgian club Sint-Truiden in the 2018–19 season.

In the second half of 2023, Kamada left Frankfurt to join the Italian club Lazio on a two-year contract, however he departed the club a year early. In July 2024, Kamada joined Premier League side Crystal Palace, helping them win their first major trophy with the 2024-25 FA Cup.

A former Japan youth international, Kamada made his senior debut in 2019, and was part of his country's squad at the FIFA World Cup in 2022 and 2026.

== Club career ==
=== Early career ===
Born in Ehime, Japan, Kamada began playing football at "Kids FC" (now FC Zebra Kids) and helped the side win TV Ehime Cup Ehime Prefectural Youth Soccer Championship U-12 when he was in 6th grade of elementary school. When Kamada was in junior high school, he then joined Gamba Osaka and was selected for the U-13 J League. However, due to injuries, Kamada was released from the club and he returned to play school football, joining Higashiyama High School in 2012. Kamada quickly made an impact at Higashiyama, playing as an attacking midfielder. He went on to make 18 appearances and scored 22 at the end of the 2013 season.

In his third year at Higashiyama High School, Kamada was appointed captain, but they finished at the bottom of the league table with 2 wins and 13 losses. Despite this, he continued to impress, having scored ten goals, making him the fourth top scorer in the 2014 season. At the end of the 2014 season, Kamada's performance at Higashiyama High School having impressed many, he supposedly attracted interest from at least five J. League clubs following his graduation. On 17 November 2014, Kamada was announced as a new signing for Sagan Tosu for the 2015 season. Ahead of the 2015 season, he was given the number 24 shirt.

=== Sagan Tosu ===
At the start of the 2015 season, Kamada was loaned out to J.League U-22, where he made two appearances for the side. He made his Sagan Tosu debut, coming on as a 75th-minute substitute, in a 1–0 loss against Albirex Niigata in the J.League Cup on 8 April. A month later on 10 May, Kamada scored his first goal on his J.League debut, having come on as a 72nd-minute substitute, in a 1–1 draw against Matsumoto Yamaga. This was followed up by setting up the winning goal for Yohei Toyoda to help Sagan Tosu win 1–0. His first five appearances of the season earned him awarded New Hero Awards of the Yamazaki Nabisco Cup. He then set up two goals, in a 3–2 win against Kashiwa Reysol on 11 July. Eleven days later on 22 July 2015, Kamada scored his second goal of the season, in a 1–1 draw against Gamba Osaka. Having started out on the substitute bench, Kamada became a first team regular for the side, playing in the midfield position. Despite suffering an injury later in the 2015 season, he went on make twenty–eight appearances and score three times in all competitions.

Ahead of the 2016 season, Kamada signed a contract with the club. At the start of the season, he started in midfield for the first seven matches. Kamada contributed two assists in two matches between 2 and 6 April against Kashiwa Reysol and Vegalta Sendai. For his performance, he, once again, awarded New Hero Awards of the Yamazaki Nabisco Cup. However, during a match against Yokohama F. Marinos on 20 April, he suffered an elbow injury and was substituted as a result. Following this, it was announced on 22 April that Kamada was out for two weeks. It wasn't until 13 May when he returned to the starting line–up against FC Tokyo and played 55 minutes before being substituted, in a 0–0 draw. On 18 June, Kamada scored his first goals of the season, in a 2–1 win against Gamba Osaka. Since returning to the first team from injury, he regained his first team place for the rest of the season. Kamada then scored five more goals later in the season, including scoring twice in a 3–2 win against Kashiwa Reysol on 22 October. His goal against Kashiwa Reysol earned him J League Goal of the Month. By the end of the season, he made thirty–four appearances and scoring eight times in all competitions.

Ahead of the 2017 season, Kamada switched number shirt from twenty–four to seven. He also signed a contract extension with Sagan Tosu. At the start of the season, Kamada continued to regain his first team place, playing in the midfield position. He scored three times in April, including a brace in a 4–4 draw against Cerezo Osaka in the J.League Cup on 26 April The following month saw Kamada score two more goals for the club. He made his last appearance of the season against Urawa Red Diamonds on 25 June, setting up the club's first goal of the game in a 2–1 win. In his final season, Kamada made 16 appearances, scoring three goals.

=== Eintracht Frankfurt ===
In June 2017, Kamada joined Bundesliga club Eintracht Frankfurt, signing a four-year contract. The transfer fee was reported as €2.5 million.

Kamada made his debut for Frankfurt in the first round of the DFB–Pokal, starting in a match and playing 73 minutes before being substituted in a 3–0 win against TuS Erndtebrück. In a follow–up match against SC Freiburg, he made his league debut for the club, starting the match and played 67 minutes before being substituted, in a 0–0 draw. However, Kamada struggled to find first team opportunities at Eintracht Frankfurt, due to competition and his own injury concerns. Manager Niko Kovač said about his progress: "Another reason for Daichi was that he is extraordinarily good in terms of ball technique and that he is very good in the gaps, which the opponent cannot really control moves. Unfortunately, he got off a little bit badly because he was pushed away from time to time. You have to give him the time, he'll get that too." At the end of the 2017–18 season, he made four appearances in all competitions.

==== Sint-Truiden (loan) ====
In order to receive more first team football, Kamada was loaned out to Belgian side Sint-Truiden in the Belgian Pro League for the rest of the 2018–19 season on 1 September 2018. Kamada quickly made an impact for the club when he scored on his debut, in a 2–1 win against Gent on 16 September 2018. This was followed up by scoring in a 2–0 victory over Royal Antwerp. Since making his debut for Sint-Truiden, Kamada quickly established himself in the first team, playing in either the midfielder and striker positions.

He then scored three consecutive goals in three matches between 6 October 2018 and 27 October 2018 against Mouscron, K.V. Kortrijk and Club Brugge. Kamada then scored four goals in three matches between 4 November 2018 and 25 November 2018, including a brace against Eupen on 10 November 2018. He, once again, scored two goals in two matches between 5 December 2018 and 8 December 2018 against Standard Liège and Mandel United. By the end of the year, Kamada scored 11 goals in 17 appearances in all competitions.

Kamada had to wait until 3 February 2019 to score again in a 4–1 win against Eupen. A month later, on 10 March 2019, he scored his 12th goal of the season in a 1–1 draw against Mouscron. In the Group A league play-offs, Kamada later scored three goals, including a brace, in a 2–2 draw against Westerlo on 6 April 2019. At the end of the 2018–19 season, he went on to make 36 appearances and score sixteen times in all competitions.

==== Return to Eintracht Frankfurt ====
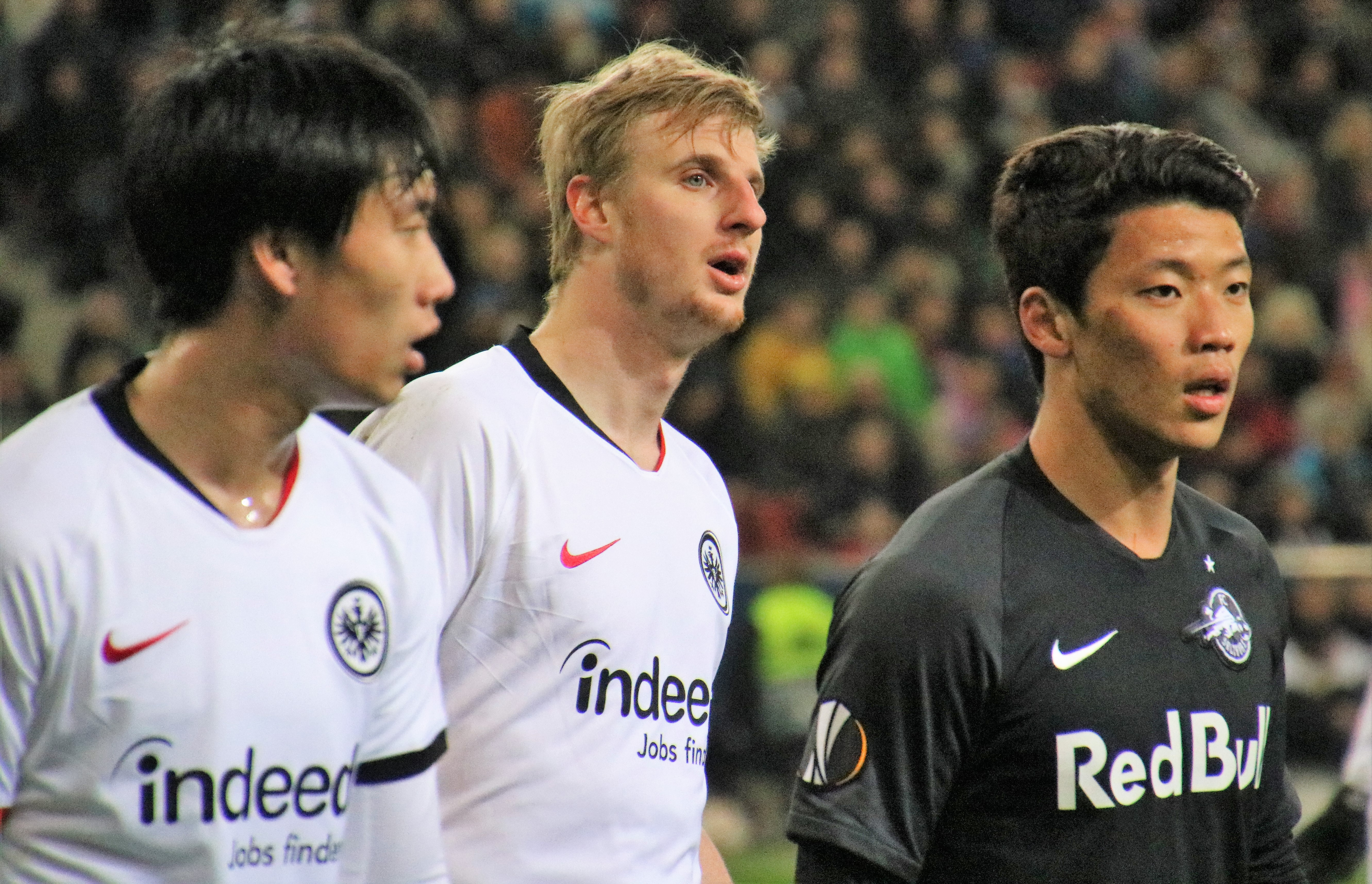
Kamada pictured with Martin Hinteregger and Hwang Hee-chan prior to the second leg of UEFA Europa League's round of 32 match against Red Bull Salzburg.

Since the start of the 2019–20 season, Kamada returned from a loan spell at Sint-Truiden and quickly became a first team regular for Eintracht Frankfurt, playing as a second striker. He then scored his first goal of the season, in a 5–3 win against Waldhof Mannheim in the first round of the DFB–Pokal. Manager Adi Hütter praised his performances, stating that Kamada had matured and presented himself differently. He then scored a brace in a 2–1 win against Arsenal in a UEFA Europa League match on 28 November. After the match, manager Hütter, once again, praised Kamada's performance for "having so much quality" by "having the ball 53 times throughout the match and completed 79 percent of his passes to teammates". He then scored to take a lead in a UEFA Europa League match against Vitória at half–time, but the club went on to lose 3–2 on 12 December 2019. At the beginning of 2020, Kamada suffered a torn ligament that kept him out throughout January. He returned to the starting line–up and played 45 minutes before being substituted, in a 1–1 draw against Fortuna Düsseldorf on 1 February 2020. On 20 February 2020, Kamada scored a hat–trick in a 4–1 home wing against Red Bull Salzburg in the first leg of UEFA Europa League's Round of 32 match. The club went on to progress to the next round of the UEFA Europa League following a 2–2 draw in the second leg. He scored his eighth goal of the season, in a 2–0 win against Werder Bremen in the quarter–finals of the DFB–Pokal on 4 March 2020. However, the season was suspended because of the COVID-19 pandemic and was pushed back to two months. Once the season resumed behind closed doors, Kamada then scored his ninth goal of the season, as well as, setting up the club's first goal of the game, in a 3–3 draw against SC Freiburg on 26 May. This was followed up by scoring in a 2–1 win against VfL Wolfsburg. By the end of the season, Kamada had made 48 appearances and scoring sixteen times in all competitions, making him the club's third top scorer of the season. Following this, Frankfurt began talks with the player over a new contract. During the negotiation, manager Hütter wanted Kamada to stay, describing him as "a great, interesting player".

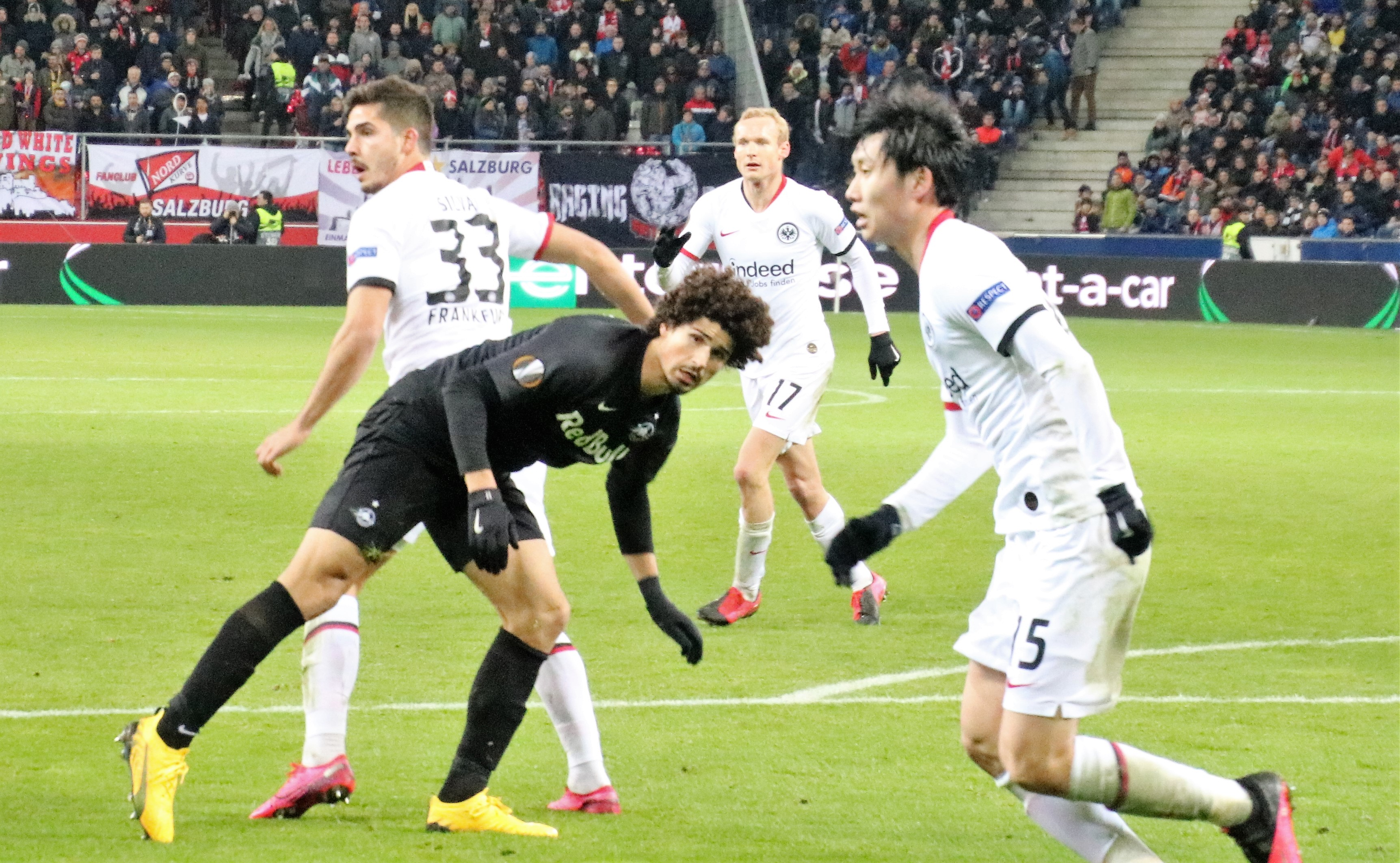
Kamada chasing the ball during the second leg of UEFA Europa League's round of 32 match against Red Bull Salzburg.

Three days before the start of the 2020–21 season, Kamada signed a contract extension with Eintracht Frankfurt, keeping him until 2023, with manager Hütter played a factor to his decision. A week later against Hertha BSC on 25 September 2020, he played a key role to match by setting up two goals in a 3–1 win. In a follow–up match against Hoffenheim, Kamada scored his first goal of the season, in a 2–1 win. Since the start of the 2020–21 season, he continued to be a first team regular, playing in the attacking midfield position. Kamada played a role in a match against Union Berlin when he sets up two goals, as the club drew 3–3 on 28 November 2020. In a follow–up match, Kamada played another role in a match against Borussia Dortmund when he scored the opening goal of the game, in a 1–1 draw. Since the start of the 2020–21 season, Kamada started in every match until he was dropped to the substitute bench for the last two matches of the year, with manager Hütter said the player needs to improve on his performance. In the second half of the season, Kamada continued alternating between a starting and a substitute role despite competing with Amin Younes. In a match against Bayern Munich on 20 February 2021, he played a key role to the match by scoring a goal and setting up a goal for Younes, in a 2–1 win. After missing one match due to lumbago, Kamada scored on his return from injury, in a 1–1 draw against RB Leipzig on 14 March. Despite scoring on his return, he played in the right–midfield position, which Manager Hütter acknowledged the negativity criticism from Frankfurter Rundschau, describing it as "a failed experiment". On 10 April, Kamada scored his fifth goal of the season and set up one of the goals, in a 4–3 win against VfL Wolfsburg. Despite failing to qualify for the UEFA Champions League next season, his contributions saw Eintracht Frankfurt qualify for the UEFA Europa League instead. At the end of the 2020–21 season, he had made 34 appearances and scored five times in all competitions.

At the start of the 2021–22 season, Kamada found himself alternating between a starting and a substitute role under the new management of Oliver Glasner. He then scored three consecutive goals in the UEFA Europa League matches, including two separate matches against Olympiacos. He scored his first league goal of the season, which turned out to be a winning goal, in a 3–2 win against Borussia Mönchengladbach on 15 December 2021. Kamada scored a month later on 16 January 2022, in a 1–1 draw against FC Augsburg. After missing one match due to a torn muscle fibre, Kamada returned to the starting line–up from injury, in a 2–0 loss against VfL Wolfsburg on 12 February 2022. Initially placed on the substitute bench following his return from injury, he regained his first team place for the rest of the season. Kamada scored two goals in two matches between 9 March 2022 and 13 March 2022, which were winning goals against Real Betis and VfL Bochum. On 14 April 2022, he set up one of the goals for Filip Kostić as the club defeated Barcelona 3–2 at the Camp Nou and 4–3 on aggregate in the UEFA Europa League to qualify for the semi-finals. Kamada, once again, scored two goals in two matches, including scoring the winning goal in a 2–1 win over West Ham United in the first leg of the semi-finals of the Europa League on 28 April 2022. Eventually, Eintracht Frankfurt won the tournament after beating Rangers 5–4 on penalty shootouts in the final, in which he scored one of them. At the end of the 2021–22 season, Kamada made 46 appearances and scoring nine times in all competitions.

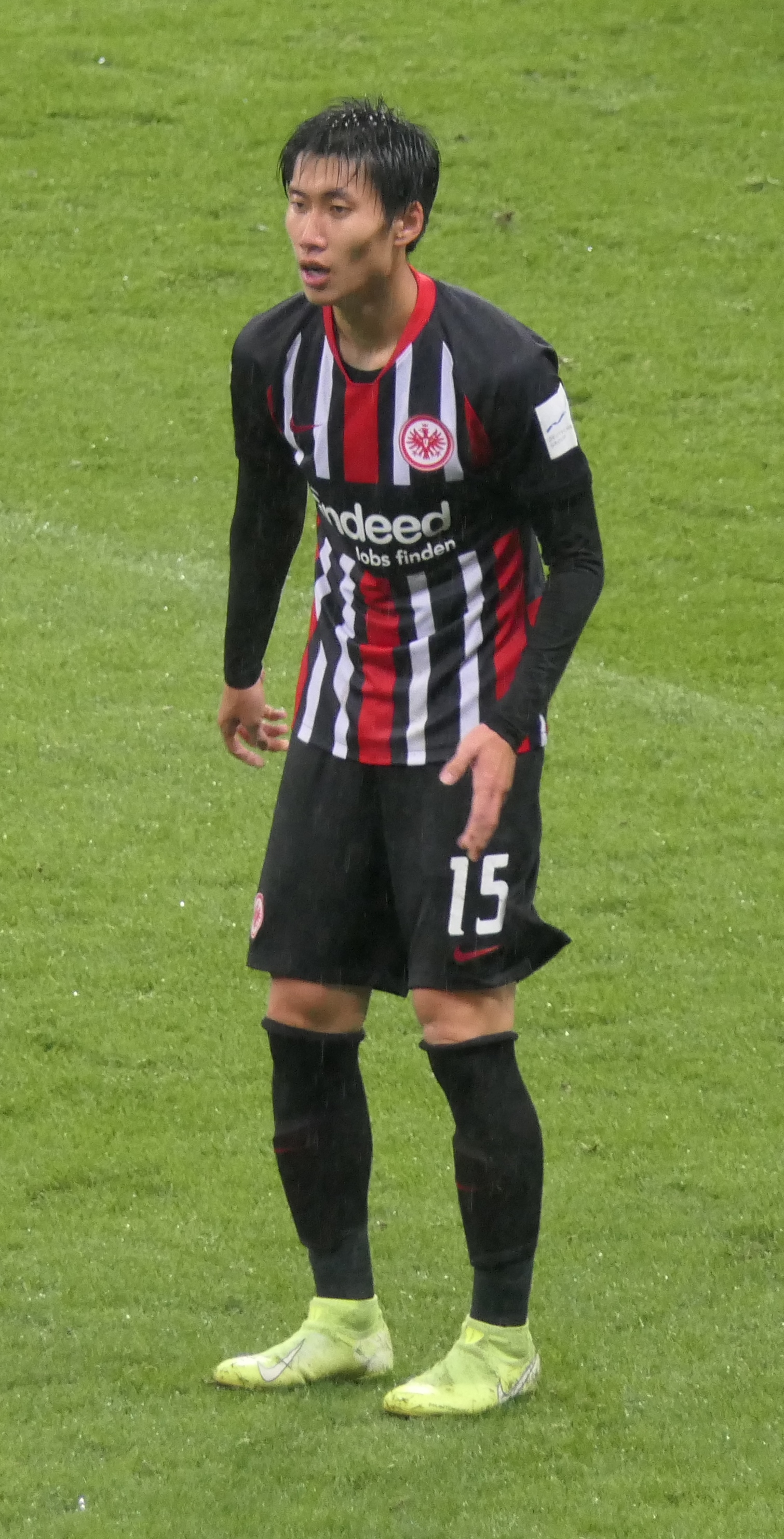
Kamada playing for Eintracht Frankfurt in 2019.

Kamada started the 2022–23 season well when he scored four goals in the first month to the season, including a brace against 1. FC Magdeburg in the first round of DFB–Pokal. The performance also earned the trust of manager Glasner, who continued to give him a place in the first team. Kamada then scored two more goals throughout September, coming against VfB Stuttgart and Bayer Leverkusen. Between 15 October 2022 and 1 November 2022, he scored a total of six goals in all competitions, including the UEFA Champions League group stage when he scored in the last three consecutive matches against Tottenham Hotspur, Marseille and Sporting CP, which helped his club to reach the knockout phase. After missing one match due to an illness in early–November, Kamada returned to the starting line–up against Hoffenheim on 9 November 2022 and set up one of the goals, in a 4–2 win.

Following the World Cup, he regained his place in the first team and began rotating in either the centre–midfield or attacking midfield positions. Kamada had to wait until 7 February 2023 when he scored in the last 16 of the DFB–Pokal, in a 4–2 win against Darmstadt 98. However, Kamada faced criticism by Frankfurter Rundschau for his lack of form, which saw him struggle to score goals. In the semi–finals of the DFB–Pokal, he scored his first goal in almost three months, in a 3–2 win against Stuttgart to help Eintracht Frankfurt reach the final. After the match, Frankfurter Rundschau, who have been critical of Kamada's performance, reviewed positively towards his performance. He then scored two goals in two matches between 13 May 2023 and 20 May 2023 against Mainz 05 and Schalke 04. Kamada made his last appearance for the club, starting the match, in a 2–0 loss against RB Leipzig in the DFB–Pokal final. At the end of the 2022–23 season, he made 47 appearances and scoring 16 times in all competitions. Between 2022 and 2023, Kamada's future at Eintracht Frankfurt was speculated by local newspaper. Frankfurter Rundschau, with his contract expiring at the end of the 2022–23 season. This led to Eintracht Frankfurt began opening a contract negotiations in effort to keep the player. He was linked with a move to European clubs, such as, Benfica, Borussia Dortmund, Barcelona and Atlético Madrid. It was confirmed on 13 April 2023 that Kamada would be leaving the club.

=== Lazio ===
On 3 August 2023, Serie A club Lazio announced that Kamada had arrived in Rome to complete his move to the club on a free transfer, after his contract with Eintracht Frankfurt had not been renewed, for a reported two-year contract. The next day, he officially joined the club, pending the entry visa to Italy.

Kamada made his debut for Lazio, starting a match and playing 54 minutes before being substituted, in a 2–1 loss against Lecce. On 2 September, he scored his first goal in a 2–1 away victory over Napoli. However, Kamada underperformed under the management of Maurizio Sarri, as Sarri put Kamada in the winger position, which proved to be ineffective, as he struggled to score goals on the same pace as did at Eintracht Frankfurt. With his much of his playing time coming from the substitute bench, Kamada was linked with a move to Galatasaray in the January transfer window, but the move fell through, due to the club's CEO Claudio Lotito demanding 10 million euros, as well as, Kamada, himself, wanted to stay at Lazio. But following the departure of Sarri, Kamada soon got more playing time under the new management of Igor Tudor. He then scored his second goal for the club, in a 1–1 draw against Inter Milan on 18 May 2024. At the end of the 2023–24 season, Kamada went on to make 38 appearances and scored two times in all competitions.

By the end of the 2023–24 season, Lazio CEO Claudio Lotito claimed that Kamada had demanded a bonus of €2.5 million to extend his contract for another year, while declaring that he would "send away all the players who turn out to be mercenaries". Kamada later confirmed that he would not renew his contract with the club, stating that "he did not care about the money" during the talks. Upon leaving Lazio, Kamada said: "When I arrived at Lazio, I felt that everyone expected a lot from me. Everyone is passionate about football in Italy and it's beautiful. But for me it was difficult above all because I arrived at the team where the best midfielder in Serie A played, Sergej Milinković-Savić. And I had to take his place. So everyone expected a lot from me in matches, but also during training. I felt that a normal performance from me wasn't enough."

=== Crystal Palace ===
Kamada playing for Palace against Arsenal in 2026

On 1 July 2024, Kamada officially joined Premier League club Crystal Palace on a free transfer, signing a two-year contract with the club, while also becoming the first-ever Japanese player in the club's history. The move also saw him reunite with manager Oliver Glasner.

Kamada made his debut for Crystal Palace on 18 August 2024, starting in a 2-1 loss against Brentford in the season opener. In doing so, Kamada became the 1000th player to make his debut for the club. Two weeks later on 27 August 2024, he scored his first goal for Palace and set up another goal for Jean-Philippe Mateta, in a 4–0 win against Norwich City in the second round of the League Cup.

On 17 May 2025, Kamada won the FA Cup as Crystal Palace beat Manchester City 1–0 in the 2025 FA Cup final to secure the club's first major trophy. Kamada (along with Mateta and Daniel Muñoz) helped to set up the match's lone goal scored by Eberechi Eze in the 16th minute of the game.

== International career ==
=== Youth career ===
Having previously been called up to the Japan's youth team for the rest of 2015, Kamada was called up to the U21 squad in August 2015. He went on to make two appearances for the U21 side.

In March 2016, Kamada was called up to the Japan U23 squad for the first time. He made his Japan U23 debut, coming on as a 65th-minute substitute, in a 2–1 win against Mexico on 25 March 2016. In May 2016, Kamada was called up to the Japan U23 squad for the Toulon Tournament once again. Kamada made his first start for the Japan U23 side, and played 64 minutes before being substituted, in a 2–1 win against Guinea U23 on 25 May 2016. Kamada went on to make four appearances for Japan U23, with two other matches he featured were substitute.

=== Senior career ===
Having previously failed to make a cut to the senior squad for the 2019 AFC Asian Cup, it was announced on 15 March 2019 that Kamada was called up to the Japan squad for the first time. He made his debut for the Japn on 22 March 2019 in a friendly against Colombia, as a 79th-minute substitute for Takumi Minamino. Kamada then scored his first goal, in a 6–0 win against Mongolia on 10 October 2019.

Almost a year later, in October 2020, Kamada was called up to the squad again. He made his first appearance in almost a year, coming on as a 71st-minute substitute, in a 0–0 draw against Cameroon on 14 October 2020. Kamada then scored three goals in three matches for Japan between 25 March 2021 and 28 May 2021 against South Korea, Mongolia and Myanmar. In May 2022, he was called up in time for the 2022 Kirin Cup Soccer. Prior to the tournament, Kamada scored his first goal in over a year, and put up one assist, in a 4–1 win over Paraguay. He played once for Japan in the tournament, as Japan lost 3–0 against Tunisia. Three months later on 23 September 2022, Kamada scored once again, in a 2–0 win against United States.

On 1 November 2022, Kamada was named in the final squad for the 2022 FIFA World Cup in Qatar. He made his World Cup debut, starting a match, in Japan's 2–1 win over Germany. He was in the starting eleven squad in Japan's 2–1 win over Spain to help his country reached the knockout phase. In the last-16 of the World Cup against Croatia, Kamada started the match and played 75 minutes before being substituted, as the match eventually ended 1–1 with Japan crashing out after their defeat on penalties. Reflecting on playing in the World Cup, he expressed his disappointment of being the only starter in the attacking position to not score or provide assists.

Following the World Cup, Kamada received a call–up from Japan for the Kirin Challenge Cup on 15 March 2023. He played his first match for the Japan since the World Cup, in a 1–1 draw against Uruguay on 24 March 2023. On 16 November 2023, Kamada scored Japan's second goal of the game, in a 5–0 win against Myanmar. However, on 1 January 2024, he was cut from Japan's squad for the AFC Asian Cup in Qatar. Kamada was able to make his return to the team when he was called up on 24 May 2024. Kamada made his first appearance for Japan in six months against Myanmar on 6 June 2024 and set up one of the goals, in a 5–0 win.

On 15 May 2026, Kamada was selected in the 26-man squad for the 2026 FIFA World Cup. On 14 June, Kamada scored an 89th minute equalizer against the Netherlands to tie the match 2–2 in Japan's World Cup opener when a header from Kōki Ogawa deflected off of Kamada's head into the goal. It was Japan's latest ever World Cup goal. On 20 June, he scored a goal in the fourth minute of a 4–0 victory over Tunisia, becoming Japan's fastest ever scorer in a World Cup match, breaking the previous record held by Shinji Kagawa in 2018.

== Personal life ==
Kamada's father, Fukushige, was once a footballer and worked for the seniors and juniors at the Osaka University of Physical Education. Because of his father's guidance, Kamada worked hard and learned how to use his body, enabling him to go back and forth between the attacking third and middle thirds, and his number of pass variations increased. He has a younger brother, Hiromu Kamada, who is also a footballer. In his free time, Kamada has said he is learning German and reads manga. Kamada credited teammate Makoto Hasebe for helping him settle down in Germany.

At one point, Kamada considered going to university, saying: "Going to college may be a necessary path for me, but I still have a feeling that I can't give up. If I become a professional after graduating from college, I'm already 22 years old. However, I thought it would be very late to become a professional at the age of 22. For me, it is ideal that I go to the J League from high school and start from the first year, and I think I should do that. And I'm thinking about the future of the J League. I've always had a dream to go out into the world and play. I don't appreciate it, but I have enough confidence to do it." Growing up, Kamada said he wanted to be a footballer. On 25 May 2017, Kamada announced his marriage, to a woman he had been dating for a long time. A year later in October 2018, he became a first time father when his wife gave birth to a baby boy. Since moving to Eintracht Frankfurt, Kamada resides in the city with his family.

In July 2023, Kamada released his first book titled Unwavering Conviction: 12 People Testify: Japan National Team Soccer Player Kamada Daichi's Growth Story.

== Career statistics ==
=== Club ===
As of match played 5 November 2026

Appearances and goals by club, season and competition
| Club | Season | League | | | National cup (Note: Includes Emperor's Cup, DFB-Pokal, Belgian Cup, Coppa Italia, FA Cup) | | League cup (Note: Includes J.League Cup, EFL Cup) | | Continental | | Other | | Total | |
| Club | Season | Division | Apps | Goals | Apps | Goals | Apps | Goals | Apps | Goals | Apps | Goals | Apps | Goals |
|---|---|---|---|---|---|---|---|---|---|---|---|---|---|---|
| Sagan Tosu | 2015 | J1 League | 21 | 3 | 3 | 0 | 4 | 0 | — | | — | | 28 | 3 |
| Sagan Tosu | 2016 | J1 League | 28 | 7 | 3 | 1 | 3 | 0 | — | | — | | 34 | 8 |
| Sagan Tosu | 2017 | J1 League | 16 | 3 | 1 | 0 | 1 | 2 | — | | — | | 18 | 5 |
| Sagan Tosu | Total | | 65 | 13 | 7 | 1 | 8 | 2 | — | | — | | 80 | 16 |
| Eintracht Frankfurt | 2017–18 | Bundesliga | 3 | 0 | 1 | 0 | — | | — | | — | | 4 | 0 |
| Eintracht Frankfurt | 2019–20 | Bundesliga | 28 | 2 | 4 | 2 | — | | 16 (Note: Appearances in UEFA Europa League) | 6 | — | | 48 | 10 |
| Eintracht Frankfurt | 2020–21 | Bundesliga | 32 | 5 | 2 | 0 | — | | — | | — | | 34 | 5 |
| Eintracht Frankfurt | 2021–22 | Bundesliga | 32 | 4 | 1 | 0 | — | | 13 | 5 | — | | 46 | 9 |
| Eintracht Frankfurt | 2022–23 | Bundesliga | 32 | 9 | 6 | 4 | — | | 8 (Note: Appearances in UEFA Champions League) | 3 | 1 (Note: Appearance in UEFA Super Cup) | 0 | 47 | 16 |
| Eintracht Frankfurt | Total | | 127 | 20 | 14 | 6 | — | | 37 | 14 | 1 | 0 | 179 | 40 |
| Sint-Truiden (loan) | 2018–19 | Belgian Pro League | 34 | 15 | 2 | 1 | — | | — | | — | | 36 | 16 |
| Lazio | 2023–24 | Serie A | 29 | 2 | 2 | 0 | — | | 7 | 0 | 0 | 0 | 38 | 2 |
| Crystal Palace | 2024–25 | Premier League | 34 | 0 | 5 | 0 | 4 | 2 | — | | — | | 43 | 2 |
| Crystal Palace | 2025–26 | Premier League | 28 | 0 | 0 | 0 | 2 | 0 | 15 (Note: Appearances in UEFA Conference League) | 1 | 1 (Note: Appearance in FA Community Shield) | 0 | 46 | 1 |
| Crystal Palace | 2026–27 | Premier League | 9 | 1 | 0 | 0 | 2 | 1 | 4 | 2 | — | | 15 | 4 |
| Crystal Palace | Total | | 71 | 1 | 5 | 0 | 8 | 3 | 19 | 3 | 1 | 0 | 104 | 7 |
| Career total | | | 329 | 51 | 30 | 9 | 16 | 4 | 63 | 17 | 2 | 0 | 439 | 81 |

=== International ===
As of match played 14 November 2026

Appearances and goals by national team and year
| National team | Year | Apps | Goals |
|---|---|---|---|
| Japan | 2019 | 4 | 1 |
| Japan | 2020 | 4 | 0 |
| Japan | 2021 | 8 | 3 |
| Japan | 2022 | 10 | 2 |
| Japan | 2023 | 5 | 1 |
| Japan | 2024 | 7 | 1 |
| Japan | 2025 | 9 | 4 |
| Japan | 2026 | 11 | 2 |
| Total | | 58 | 14 |

Scores and results list Japan's goal tally first, score column indicates score after each Kamada goal.

List of international goals scored by Daichi Kamada
| No. | Date | Venue | Cap | Opponent | Score | Result | Competition |
|---|---|---|---|---|---|---|---|
| 1 | 10 October 2019 | Saitama Stadium 2002, Saitama, Japan | 3 | Mongolia | 6–0 | 6–0 | 2022 FIFA World Cup qualification |
| 2 | 25 March 2021 | Nissan Stadium, Yokohama, Japan | 9 | South Korea | 2–0 | 3–0 | Friendly |
| 3 | 30 March 2021 | Fukuda Denshi Arena, Chiba, Japan | 10 | Mongolia | 3–0 | 14–0 | 2022 FIFA World Cup qualification |
| 4 | 28 May 2021 | Fukuda Denshi Arena, Chiba, Japan | 11 | Myanmar | 8–0 | 10–0 | 2022 FIFA World Cup qualification |
| 5 | 2 June 2022 | Sapporo Dome, Sapporo, Japan | 17 | Paraguay | 2–0 | 4–1 | 2022 Kirin Challenge Cup |
| 6 | 23 September 2022 | Merkur Spiel-Arena, Düsseldorf, Germany | 20 | United States | 1–0 | 2–0 | 2022 Kirin Challenge Cup |
| 7 | 16 November 2023 | Suita City Football Stadium, Suita, Japan | 31 | Myanmar | 2–0 | 5–0 | 2026 FIFA World Cup qualification |
| 8 | 10 October 2024 | King Abdullah Sports City, Jeddah, Saudi Arabia | 35 | Saudi Arabia | 1–0 | 2–0 | 2026 FIFA World Cup qualification |
| 9 | 20 March 2025 | Saitama Stadium 2002, Saitama, Japan | 39 | Bahrain | 1–0 | 2–0 | 2026 FIFA World Cup qualification |
| 10 | 10 June 2025 | Suita City Football Stadium, Osaka, Japan | 42 | Indonesia | 1–0 | 6–0 | 2026 FIFA World Cup qualification |
| 11 | 10 June 2025 | Suita City Football Stadium, Osaka, Japan | 42 | Indonesia | 3–0 | 6–0 | 2026 FIFA World Cup qualification |
| 12 | 18 November 2025 | Japan National Stadium, Tokyo, Japan | 47 | Bolivia | 1–0 | 3–0 | 2025 Kirin Challenge Cup |
| 13 | 14 June 2026 | AT&T Stadium, Arlington, United States | 50 | Netherlands | 2–2 | 2–2 | 2026 FIFA World Cup |
| 14 | 20 June 2026 | Estadio BBVA, Guadalupe, Mexico | 51 | Tunisia | 1–0 | 4–0 | 2026 FIFA World Cup |

== Honours ==
Eintracht Frankfurt

- DFB-Pokal: 2017–18
- UEFA Europa League: 2021–22

Crystal Palace

- FA Cup: 2024–25
- FA Community Shield: 2025
- UEFA Conference League: 2025–26

Individual

- Eintracht Frankfurt All-time XI by Bundesliga: 2022
- IFFHS Asian Men's Team of the Year: 2022, 2023, 2024
- Japan Pro-Footballers Association Best XI: 2022
