= Dario Gebuhr =

German footballer (born 2003)

Personal information
- Full name: Dario Ndubuisi Gebuhr
- Date of birth: 12 September 2003 (age 23)
- Place of birth: Wiesbaden, Germany
- Height: 1.88 m (6 ft 2 in)
- Position: Centre-back

Team information
- Current team: Eintracht Trier (on loan from Hansa Rostock)
- Number: 24

Youth career
- 2006–2015: 1.SC Kohlheck
- 2015–2017: Wehen Wiesbaden
- 2017–2023: Eintracht Frankfurt

Senior career*
Years	Team	Apps	(Gls)
2022–2024	Eintracht Frankfurt II	57	(2)
2023–2024	Eintracht Frankfurt	1	(0)
2024–	Hansa Rostock	18	(1)
2024–	Hansa Rostock II	7	(2)
2026	→ Chemnitzer FC (loan)	12	(1)
2026–	→ Eintracht Trier (loan)	4	(0)
- * Club domestic league appearances and goals as of 24 September 2026

Dario Ndubuisi Gebuhr (born 12 September 2003) is a German professional footballer who plays as a centre-back for Regionalliga Südwest club Eintracht Trier on loan from Hansa Rostock.

== Career ==
Gebuhr is a youth product of 1.SC Kohlheck, Wehen Wiesbaden and Eintracht Frankfurt. On 17 March 2023, he signed a professional contract with the club until 2024. He made is senior and professional debut with Eintracht Frankfurt as a late substitute in a 4–0 Bundesliga loss to Borussia Dortmund on 22 April 2023.

On 18 June 2024, Gebuhr signed with Hansa Rostock.
