= Saliou Sané =

German footballer (born 1992)

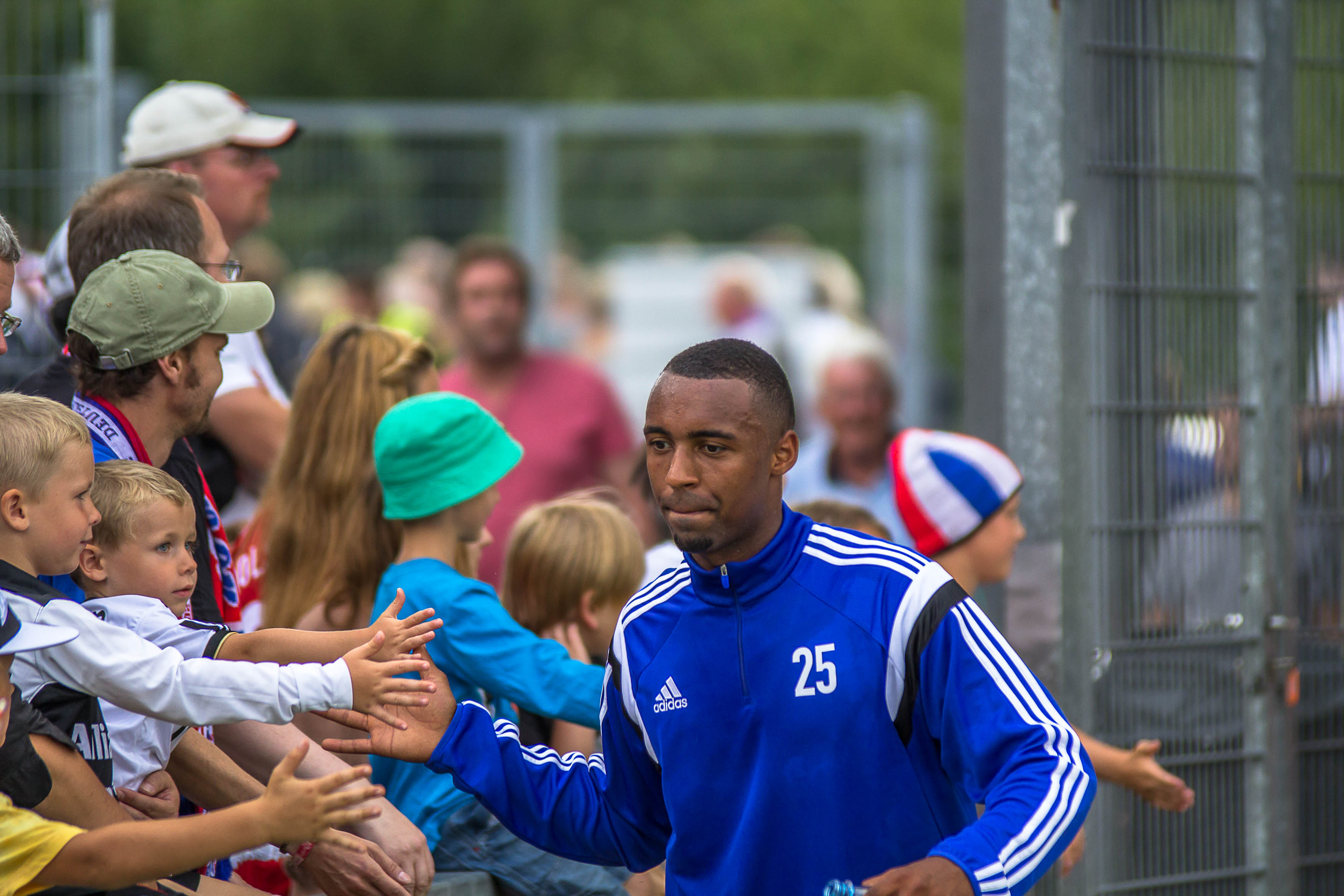
- Sané with Kiel in 2014

Personal information
- Date of birth: 19 July 1992 (age 34)
- Place of birth: Hanover, Germany
- Height: 1.87 m (6 ft 2 in)
- Position: Forward

Team information
- Current team: SC Young Fellows Juventus
- Number: 17

Youth career
- 2001–2007: Hannoverscher SC
- 2007–2011: Hannover 96

Senior career*
Years	Team	Apps	(Gls)
2011–2012	Hannover 96 II	20	(1)
2012–2013	TSV Havelse	33	(12)
2013–2014	SC Paderborn	9	(1)
2013–2014	SC Paderborn II	10	(1)
2014–2016	Holstein Kiel	49	(2)
2016–2017	Sportfreunde Lotte	18	(3)
2017–2018	Sonnenhof Großaspach	29	(8)
2018–2020	Karlsruher SC	23	(0)
2020–2024	Würzburger Kickers	107	(48)
2021	→ 1. FC Magdeburg (loan)	12	(2)
2024–2026	SV Ried	20	(2)
2026–	SC Young Fellows Juventus	7	(4)
- * Club domestic league appearances and goals as of 1 October 2026

Saliou Sané (born 19 July 1992) is a German professional footballer who plays as a forward for Swiss club SC Young Fellows Juventus.
