= Ivan Franjić (footballer, born 1997) =

German footballer

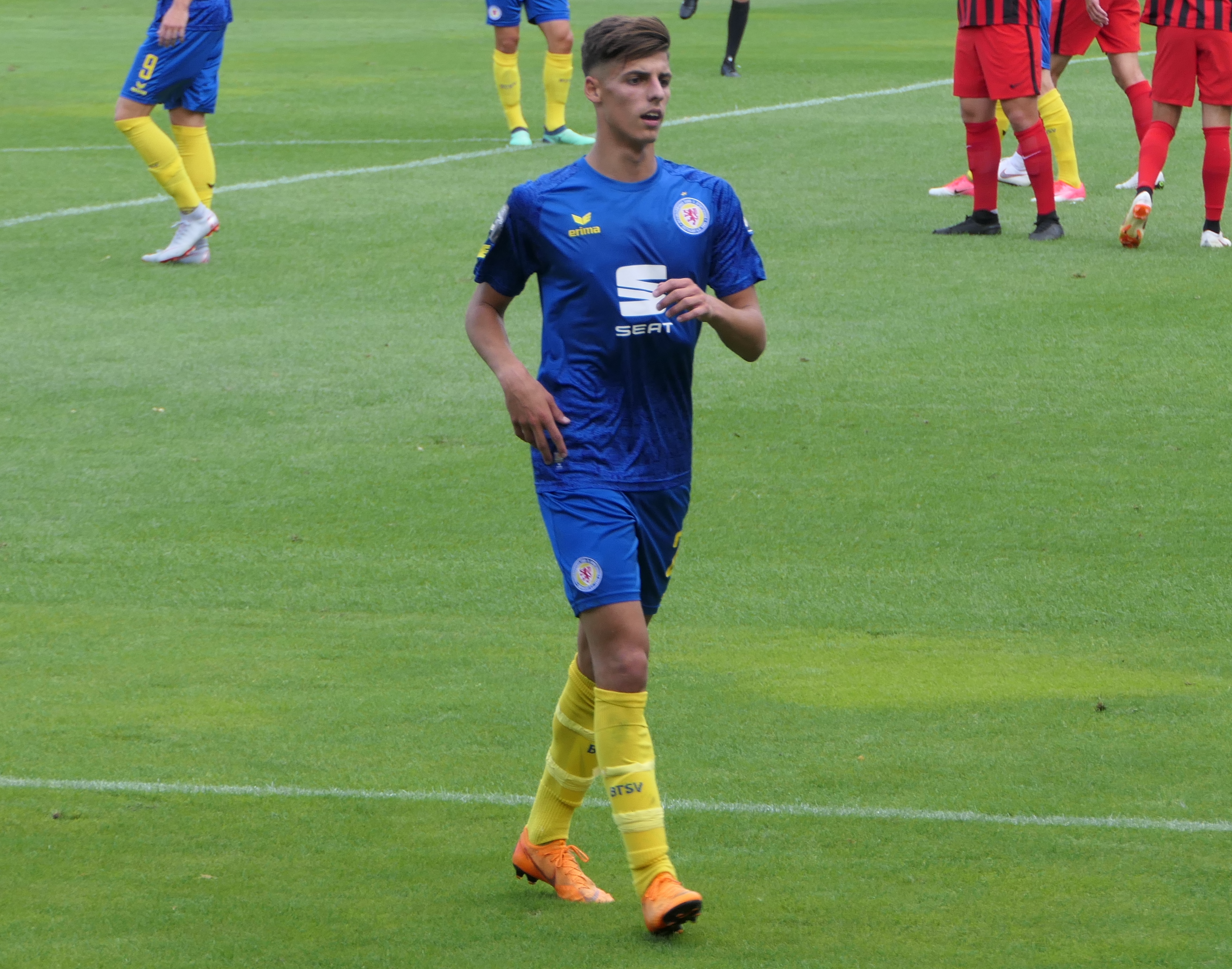
- Franjić with Eintracht Braunschweig in 2018

Personal information
- Full name: Ivan Leon Franjić
- Date of birth: 8 September 1997 (age 29)
- Place of birth: Altenkirchen, Germany
- Height: 1.82 m (6 ft 0 in)
- Position: Midfielder

Team information
- Current team: Würzburger Kickers
- Number: 37

Youth career
- –2009: SG Neitersen/Altenkirchen
- 2009–2012: Bayer Leverkusen
- 2012–2013: Sportfreunde Siegen
- 2013–2014: TSC Euskirchen
- 2014–2016: Erzgebirge Aue

Senior career*
Years	Team	Apps	(Gls)
2016–2017	VFC Plauen	27	(4)
2017–2018	Germania Halberstadt	31	(4)
2018–2019	Eintracht Braunschweig	10	(0)
2019	1. FC Saarbrücken	6	(0)
2019–2020	Næstved	26	(1)
2021–2022	FSV Frankfurt	33	(2)
2022–2024	Würzburger Kickers	64	(14)
2024–2026	SV Wehen Wiesbaden	30	(1)
2026–	Würzburger Kickers	0	(0)
- * Club domestic league appearances and goals as of 24 May 2026

Ivan Leon Franjić (born 8 September 1997) is a German professional footballer who plays as a midfielder for 3. Liga club Würzburger Kickers.

== Career ==
In January 2019, Franjić agreed the termination of his contract with Eintracht Braunschweig.

On 31 January 2019, Franjić signed with 1. FC Saarbrücken for one-and-a-half years. Six months later, on 9 August 2019, Franjić joined Danish 1st Division club Næstved BK.

Franjić joined recently relegated Regionalliga Bayern club Würzburger Kickers on 3 June 2022.

On 1 May 2024, Franjić signed a contract with SV Wehen Wiesbaden in 3. Liga, effective 1 July.
