= Dardan Karimani =

Association footballer (born 1998)

Personal information
- Full name: Dardan Feim Karimani
- Date of birth: 23 November 1998 (age 27)
- Place of birth: Soest, Germany
- Height: 1.78 m (5 ft 10 in)
- Position: Midfielder

Team information
- Current team: Chemnitzer FC
- Number: 18

Youth career
- 1. SC Lippetal
- –2013: SV Lippstadt
- 2013–2014: Borussia Dortmund
- 2014–2016: SC Paderborn

Senior career*
Years	Team	Apps	(Gls)
2016–2019	SC Paderborn II	51	(16)
2017–2018	SC Paderborn	1	(0)
2019–2020	SC Verl	11	(0)
2020–2022	SV Lippstadt	69	(7)
2022–2024	Würzburger Kickers	65	(14)
2024–	Chemnitzer FC	19	(0)

International career^{‡}
2015	Albania U19	1	(0)
- * Club domestic league appearances and goals as of 30 June 2025 ‡ National team caps and goals as of 30 August 2018

Dardan Feim Karimani (born 23 November 1998) is a professional footballer who plays as a midfielder for Regionalliga Nordost club Chemnitzer FC. Born in Germany, he has represented Albania at youth level.

== Early life ==
Karimani was born in Soest, Germany from Kosovo Albanian parents from Mitrovica, Kosovo.

== Club career ==
In summer 2014 Karimani signed with 3. Liga club SC Paderborn 07 from Borussia Dortmund.

In January 2019, after featuring for Paderborn's reserves, Karimani joined Regionalliga West side SC Verl on a free transfer.

On 25 May 2022, Karimani signed a one-year contract with recently relegated Regionalliga Bayern club Würzburger Kickers.

On 25 September 2024, Karimani joined Regionalliga Nordost club Chemnitzer FC and signed a one-year contract.

== International career ==
=== Albania ===
==== Under-19 ====
On 7 January 2015. Karimani made his debut with Albania U19 in a friendly match against Italy U18 after being named in the starting line-up, he could not be part of Albania national youth teams because of the lack of an Albanian passport even though the president through a decree has decided that Karimani had been provided with a passport.

=== Kosovo ===
==== Under-21 ====
On 30 August 2018. Karimani received a call-up from Kosovo U21 for a 2019 UEFA European Under-21 Championship qualification match against Republic of Ireland U21.
