= 2026–27 RB Leipzig season =

RB Leipzig
2026–27 season
- Owner: Red Bull GmbH
- Chairman: Johann Plenge
- Head coach: Martín Demichelis
- Stadium: Red Bull Arena
- Bundesliga: 4th
- DFB-Pokal: Round of 16
- UEFA Champions League: League phase
- Top goalscorer: League: Christopher Nkunku; Rômulo (5 each); All: Antonio Nusa (6)
Home colours	Away colours	Third colours

The 2026–27 season is the 18th season in the history of RB Leipzig, and the club's eleventh consecutive season in the Bundesliga. In addition to the domestic league, the club is participating in the DFB-Pokal and the UEFA Champions League.

== Players ==
=== First-team squad ===
As of 3 September 2026

Note: Flags indicate national team as defined under FIFA eligibility rules; some limited exceptions apply. Players may hold more than one non-FIFA nationality.

No.	Pos.	Nation	Player
1	GK	NOR	Ørjan Nyland
2	DF	FRA	Abdoul Koné
3	DF	FRA	Maxime Estève
4	DF	HUN	Willi Orbán
6	MF	COD	Ezechiel Banzuzi
7	FW	NOR	Antonio Nusa
8	MF	GER	Assan Ouédraogo
9	FW	ESP	Marc Guiu
10	MF	GER	Brajan Gruda (on loan from Brighton & Hove Albion)
11	FW	BEL	Johan Bakayoko
13	MF	AUT	Nicolas Seiwald
14	MF	AUT	Christoph Baumgartner
16	DF	GER	Lukas Klostermann
17	DF	GER	Ridle Baku
18	FW	NGR	Suleman Sani

No.	Pos.	Nation	Player
20	MF	GER	Rocco Reitz (vice-captain)
21	MF	MAR	Neil El Aynaoui (on loan from Roma)
22	DF	GER	David Raum (captain)
23	DF	FRA	Castello Lukeba
25	GK	GER	Leopold Zingerle
26	GK	BEL	Maarten Vandevoordt
27	FW	FRA	Tidiam Gomis
28	FW	FRA	Christopher Nkunku (on loan from Milan)
30	MF	SRB	Andrija Maksimović
35	DF	GER	Max Finkgräfe
37	MF	GER	Benno Kaltefleiter
39	DF	GER	Benjamin Henrichs
40	FW	BRA	Rômulo
45	FW	FRA	Samba Konaté
47	MF	GER	Viggo Gebel

=== Players out on loan ===
Note: Flags indicate national team as defined under FIFA eligibility rules; some limited exceptions apply. Players may hold more than one non-FIFA nationality.

No.	Pos.	Nation	Player
—	GK	GER	Timo Schlieck (at SC Verl until 30 June 2027)
—	DF	FRA	El Chadaille Bitshiabu (at Galatasaray until 30 June 2027)
—	DF	NED	Lutsharel Geertruida (at PSV Eindhoven until 30 June 2027)
—	DF	BEL	Joyeux Masanka Bungi (at VfB Stuttgart II until 30 June 2027)

No.	Pos.	Nation	Player
—	MF	MKD	Eljif Elmas (at Atalanta until 30 June 2027)
—	MF	BEL	Arthur Vermeeren (at Antwerp until 30 June 2027)
—	FW	DEN	Conrad Harder (at Strasbourg until 30 June 2027)
—	FW	JPN	Ota Yamamoto (at Omiya Ardija until 30 June 2027)

== Transfers ==
=== In ===
Date	Pos.	Player	From	Fee	Source
1 July 2026	MF	(Germany) Rocco Reitz	(Germany) Borussia Mönchengladbach	€20,000,000	
1 July 2026	MF	(Japan) Ota Yamamoto	(Japan) RB Omiya Ardija	€500,000	
13 July 2026	MF	(Germany) Brajan Gruda	(England) Brighton & Hove Albion	Loan extended	
17 July 2026	DF	(France) Maxime Estève	(England) Burnley	€25,000,000	
4 August 2026	GK	(Norway) Ørjan Nyland	(Spain) Sevilla	End of contract	
25 August 2026	FW	(France) Christopher Nkunku	(Italy) Milan	Loan (€3,000,000) (Note: Includes an option to buy.)	
1 September 2026	FW	(Spain) Marc Guiu	(England) Chelsea	€16,000,000	
1 September 2026	MF	(Morocco) Neil El Aynaoui	(Italy) Roma	Loan (€4,000,000)	
▼ Spending: €68,500,000

=== Out ===
Date	Pos.	Player	To	Fee	Source
1 July 2026	DF	(Germany) Frederik Jäkel	(Germany) Eintracht Braunschweig	Undisclosed	
1 July 2026	FW	(Belgium) Loïs Openda	(Italy) Juventus	€42,750,000	
1 July 2026	MF	(Austria) Xaver Schlager	(England) Nottingham Forest	End of contract	
1 July 2026	MF	(Japan) Ota Yamamoto	(Japan) RB Omiya Ardija	Loan	
3 July 2026	GK	(Germany) Timo Schlieck	(Germany) SC Verl	Loan	
3 August 2026	GK	(Hungary) Péter Gulácsi	(Spain) Villarreal	€1,500,000	
6 August 2026	FW	(Ivory Coast) Yan Diomande	(Spain) Real Madrid	€125,000,000	
19 August 2026	FW	(Germany) Robert Ramšak	(Slovenia) Aluminij	Free	
20 August 2026	DF	(Norway) Jonathan Norbye	(Norway) Haugesund	Undisclosed	
21 August 2026	DF	(Netherlands) Lutsharel Geertruida	(Netherlands) PSV Eindhoven	Loan (€1,500,000)	
22 August 2026	MF	(North Macedonia) Eljif Elmas	(Italy) Atalanta	Loan (€2,000,000)	
1 September 2026	FW	(Denmark) Conrad Harder	(France) Strasbourg	Loan	
1 September 2026	FW	(Netherlands) Ayodele Thomas	(Netherlands) NEC	€1,000,000	
1 September 2026	DF	(Belgium) Joyeux Masanka Bungi	(Germany) VfB Stuttgart II	Loan	
2 September 2026	DF	(France) El Chadaille Bitshiabu	(Turkey) Galatasaray	Loan (€2,000,000)	
3 September 2026	MF	(Belgium) Arthur Vermeeren	(Belgium) Antwerp	Loan	

== Competitions ==
=== Overall record ===
Competition	First match	Last match	Starting round	Final position	Record							
Competition	First match	Last match	Starting round	Final position	Pld	W	D	L	GF	GA	GD	Win %
Bundesliga	29 August 2026	22 May 2027	Matchday 1	TBD	10	7	0	3	32	14	+18	70.00
DFB-Pokal	22 August 2026	TBD	First round	TBD	2	2	0	0	8	1	+7	100.00
UEFA Champions League	10 September 2026	TBD	League phase	TBD	4	1	0	3	5	11	−6	25.00
Total					16	10	0	6	45	26	+19	62.50

Last updated: 21 November 2026
Source: Soccerway

=== Bundesliga ===
==== League table ====
Pos	Team	Pld	W	D	L	GF	GA	GD	Pts	Qualification or relegation
2	Bayern Munich	10	6	4	0	30	10	+20	22	Qualification for the Champions League league phase
3	SC Freiburg	10	7	1	2	21	10	+11	22	Qualification for the Champions League league phase
4	RB Leipzig	10	7	0	3	32	14	+18	21	Qualification for the Champions League league phase
5	Bayer Leverkusen	10	6	1	3	24	17	+7	19	Qualification for the Europa League league phase (Note: The 2026–27 DFB-Pokal winners also qualify for the Europa League league stage (or the sixth-placed team if the DFB-Pokal winners finish in the top five of the Bundesliga). If the DFB-Pokal winners finish in the top six of the Bundesliga, the Conference League spot will be passed to the seventh-placed team.)
6	Werder Bremen	9	4	3	2	17	15	+2	15	Qualification for the Conference League play-off round

Updated to match(es) played on 21 November 2026. Source: Bundesliga
Rules for classification: 1) Points; 2) Goal difference; 3) Goals scored; 4) Head-to-head aggregate results; 5) Head-to-head away goals scored; 6) Away goals scored; 7) Play-off at neutral site.
(Rules 4–6 only apply after all home-and-away matches have been played between the tied teams. Rule 7 only applies after the completion of the season.)

==== Results summary ====
Overall								Home						Away					
Pld	W	D	L	GF	GA	GD	Pts	W	D	L	GF	GA	GD	W	D	L	GF	GA	GD
10	7	0	3	32	14	+18	21	5	0	0	23	2	+21	2	0	3	9	12	−3

Last updated: 21 November 2026.
Source: DFB

==== Results by round ====
Round	1	2	3	4	5	6	7	8	9	10	11	12	13	14	15	16	17	18	19	20	21	22	23	24	25	26	27	28	29	30	31	32	33	34
Ground	H	A	H	A	H	A	H	A	H	A	A	H	A	H	A	H	A	A	H	A	H	A	H	A	H	A	H	H	A	H	A	H	A	H
Result	W	L	W	L	W	L	W	W	W	W																								
Position	3	8	5	9	5	7	5	4	4	4																								

Updated to match(es) played on 21 November 2026. Source: DFB
A = Away; H = Home; W = Win; D = Draw; L = Loss

==== Matches ====
The match schedule was released on 2 July 2026.

29 August 2026 1	RB Leipzig	3–0	Borussia Mönchengladbach	Leipzig
15:30 CEST (UTC+2)	Baku 26'; Nusa 49', (yellow card) 72'; Reitz 66'	Report		Stadium: Red Bull Arena; Attendance: 47,800; Referee: Sven Jablonski

5 September 2026 2	Werder Bremen	3–1	RB Leipzig	Bremen
15:30 CEST (UTC+2)	Dinkçi 4'; Chuki (yellow card) 23'; Füllkrug 68'; Grüll 80'	Report	Baku 90+5'	Stadium: Weser-Stadion; Attendance: 39,713; Referee: Benjamin Brand

13 September 2026 3	RB Leipzig	5–0	Hamburger SV	Leipzig
15:30 CEST (UTC+2)	Gomis 17'; Nusa 28'; Lukeba (yellow card) 48'; Orbán 72'; Nkunku 74'; Rômulo 77'	Report	Capaldo (yellow card) 6'; Nandja (yellow card) 71'	Stadium: Red Bull Arena; Attendance: 47,800; Referee: Florian Badstübner

20 September 2026 4	Bayer Leverkusen	2–0	RB Leipzig	Leverkusen
15:30 CEST (UTC+2)	Schick 44'; Gutiérrez 57'; Tapsoba (yellow card) 81'; Moreira (yellow card) 90+1'	Report	Nusa (yellow card) 11'; El Aynaoui (yellow card) 74'; Henrichs (yellow card) 90+1'	Stadium: BayArena; Attendance: 29,573; Referee: Robert Schröder

10 October 2026 5	RB Leipzig	6–0	Eintracht Frankfurt	Leipzig
18:30 CEST (UTC+2)	Banzuzi 1'; Nkunku 5', 41', 44'; El Aynaoui (yellow card) 27'; Nusa 54'; Gomis 89'	Report	Baum (yellow card) 62'; Knauff (yellow card) 76'; Onyedika (yellow card) 84'	Stadium: Red Bull Arena; Attendance: 47,800; Referee: Daniel Siebert

17 October 2026 6	Bayern Munich	6–1	RB Leipzig	Munich
18:30 CEST (UTC+2)	Díaz 12', 47', 69'; Pavlović 26'; Olise 34'; Laimer (yellow card) 51'; Kane 53'	Report	Maksimović 90+1'	Stadium: Allianz Arena; Attendance: 75,000; Referee: Tobias Stieler

24 October 2026 7	RB Leipzig	4–0	SV Elversberg	Leipzig
15:30 CEST (UTC+2)	Gomis 48'; Reitz (yellow card) 59'; Rômulo 66', 90+4'; Baumgartner 84'	Report	Günther (yellow card) 74'	Stadium: Red Bull Arena; Attendance: 41,129; Referee: Bastian Dankert

31 October 2026 8	Schalke 04	0–2	RB Leipzig	Gelsenkirchen
15:30 CET (UTC+1)	Becker (yellow card) 51'; Aouchiche (yellow card) 86'	Report	Nusa 37' (pen.); Rômulo 78'	Stadium: Veltins-Arena; Attendance: 61,581; Referee: Max Burda

7 November 2026 9	RB Leipzig	5–2	FC Augsburg	Leipzig
15:30 CET (UTC+1)	Raum (yellow card) 26', (goal) 45+1'; Banzuzi 33'; Nkunku 35'; Rômulo 60'; Baumgartner 66'	Report	Kade 1'; Gouweleeuw (yellow card) 45'; Fellhauer (yellow card) 72'; Ogundu 90+2'	Stadium: Red Bull Arena; Attendance: 38,292; Referee: Daniel Schlager

21 November 2026 10	Union Berlin	1–5	RB Leipzig	Berlin
15:30 CET (UTC+1)	Schäfer (yellow card) 9'; Van Den Bosch (yellow card) 17'; Aebischer 41'	Report	Gruda (yellow card) 5', (goal) 72'; Banzuzi (yellow card) 13'; Nusa 18' (pen.); Rômulo 50'; Reitz 76'; Baku 89'	Stadium: Stadion An der Alten Försterei; Attendance: 22,012; Referee: Christian Dingert

29 November 2026 11	SC Freiburg	v	RB Leipzig	Freiburg
15:30 CET (UTC+1)		Report		Stadium: Europa-Park Stadion

4–6 December 2026 12	RB Leipzig	v	Mainz 05	Leipzig
--:-- CET (UTC+1)		Report		Stadium: Red Bull Arena

11–13 December 2026 13	1. FC Köln	v	RB Leipzig	Cologne
--:-- CET (UTC+1)		Report		Stadium: RheinEnergieStadion

18–20 December 2026 14	RB Leipzig	v	Borussia Dortmund	Leipzig
--:-- CET (UTC+1)		Report		Stadium: Red Bull Arena

8–10 January 2027 15	SC Paderborn	v	RB Leipzig	Paderborn
--:-- CET (UTC+1)		Report		Stadium: Home Deluxe Arena

12–14 January 2027 16	RB Leipzig	v	VfB Stuttgart	Leipzig
--:-- CET (UTC+1)		Report		Stadium: Red Bull Arena

15–17 January 2027 17	TSG Hoffenheim	v	RB Leipzig	Sinsheim
--:-- CET (UTC+1)		Report		Stadium: Rhein-Neckar-Arena

22–24 January 2027 18	Borussia Mönchengladbach	v	RB Leipzig	Mönchengladbach
--:-- CET (UTC+1)		Report		Stadium: Borussia-Park

29–31 January 2027 19	RB Leipzig	v	Werder Bremen	Leipzig
--:-- CET (UTC+1)		Report		Stadium: Red Bull Arena

5–7 February 2027 20	Hamburger SV	v	RB Leipzig	Hamburg
--:-- CET (UTC+1)		Report		Stadium: Volksparkstadion

12–14 February 2027 21	RB Leipzig	v	Bayer Leverkusen	Leipzig
--:-- CET (UTC+1)		Report		Stadium: Red Bull Arena

19–21 February 2027 22	Eintracht Frankfurt	v	RB Leipzig	Frankfurt
--:-- CET (UTC+1)		Report		Stadium: Deutsche Bank Park

26–28 February 2027 23	RB Leipzig	v	Bayern Munich	Leipzig
--:-- CET (UTC+1)		Report		Stadium: Red Bull Arena

2–4 March 2027 24	SV Elversberg	v	RB Leipzig	Spiesen-Elversberg
--:-- CET (UTC+1)		Report		Stadium: Ursapharm-Arena

5–7 March 2027 25	RB Leipzig	v	Schalke 04	Leipzig
--:-- CET (UTC+1)		Report		Stadium: Red Bull Arena

12–14 March 2027 26	FC Augsburg	v	RB Leipzig	Augsburg
--:-- CET (UTC+1)		Report		Stadium: WWK Arena

19–21 March 2027 27	RB Leipzig	v	Union Berlin	Leipzig
--:-- CET (UTC+1)		Report		Stadium: Red Bull Arena

2–4 April 2027 28	RB Leipzig	v	SC Freiburg	Leipzig
--:-- CEST (UTC+2)		Report		Stadium: Red Bull Arena

9–11 April 2027 29	Mainz 05	v	RB Leipzig	Mainz
--:-- CEST (UTC+2)		Report		Stadium: Mewa Arena

16–18 April 2027 30	RB Leipzig	v	1. FC Köln	Leipzig
--:-- CEST (UTC+2)		Report		Stadium: Red Bull Arena

23–25 April 2027 31	Borussia Dortmund	v	RB Leipzig	Dortmund
--:-- CEST (UTC+2)		Report		Stadium: Signal Iduna Park

7–9 May 2027 32	RB Leipzig	v	SC Paderborn	Leipzig
--:-- CEST (UTC+2)		Report		Stadium: Red Bull Arena

14–16 May 2027 33	VfB Stuttgart	v	RB Leipzig	Stuttgart
--:-- CEST (UTC+2)		Report		Stadium: MHPArena

22 May 2027 34	RB Leipzig	v	TSG Hoffenheim	Leipzig
15:30 CEST (UTC+2)		Report		Stadium: Red Bull Arena

=== DFB-Pokal ===
22 August 2026 First round	Eintracht Trier	0–6	RB Leipzig	Trier
18:00 CEST (UTC+2)	Kritzer (yellow card) 29'	Report	Gruda 3'; Orbán 6'; Pelzer 45+1' (o.g.); Seiwald (yellow card) 52'; Harder 76'; Nusa 90+2'; Banzuzi 90+5'	Stadium: Moselstadion; Attendance: 9,000; Referee: Marc Philip Eckermann

27 October 2026 Second round	Rot-Weiss Essen	1–2	RB Leipzig	Essen
18:00 CET (UTC+1)	Brumme 9', (yellow card) 90+5'; Abiama (yellow card) 23'; Bätzner (yellow card) 77'	Report	Seiwald (yellow card) 34' (yellow-red card) 44'; Baumgartner (yellow card) 74', (goal) 78', 82'; El Aynaoui (yellow card) 76'; Nyland (yellow card) 90+5'	Stadium: Stadion an der Hafenstraße; Attendance: 17,467; Referee: Florian Exner

2 December 2026 Round of 16	Bayer Leverkusen	v	RB Leipzig	Leverkusen
18:00 CET (UTC+1)		Report		Stadium: BayArena

=== UEFA Champions League ===
==== League phase ====
The draw for the league phase was held on 27 August 2026.

Pos	Team	Pld	W	D	L	GF	GA	GD	Pts
28	(Spain) Villarreal	4	1	0	3	8	14	−6	3
29	(Greece) AEK Athens	4	1	0	3	5	11	−6	3
29	(Germany) RB Leipzig	4	1	0	3	5	11	−6	3
31	(Azerbaijan) Sabah	4	1	0	3	4	10	−6	3
32	(Netherlands) Feyenoord	4	1	0	3	4	11	−7	3

Updated to match(es) played on 4 November 2026. Source: UEFA
Rules for classification: League phase tiebreakers

Round	1	2	3	4	5	6	7	8
Ground	A	H	A	H	H	A	H	A
Result	L	W	L	L				
Position	32	21	29	29				
Points	0	3	3	3				

Updated to match(es) played on 4 November 2026. Source: UEFA
A = Away; H = Home; W = Win; D = Draw; L = Loss

10 September 2026 1	Como (Italy)	4–1	(Germany) RB Leipzig	Como, Italy
21:00 CEST (UTC+2)	Baturina 15'; Douvikas 38'; Paz (yellow card) 47'; Diao 54'; Perrone 90', (yellow card) 90+4'	Report	Orbán (yellow card) 2'; Nkunku (yellow card) 24'; Maksimović 58'; Banzuzi (yellow card) 64'	Stadium: Stadio Giuseppe Sinigaglia; Attendance: 10,198; Referee: Serdar Gözübüyük (Netherlands)

13 October 2026 2	RB Leipzig (Germany)	1–0	(Netherlands) PSV Eindhoven	Leipzig, Germany
21:00 CEST (UTC+2)	Gruda 75'; Nusa (yellow card) 80'	Report	Perišić (penalty missed) 19'; Dest (yellow card) 43'; Obispo (yellow card) 85'	Stadium: Red Bull Arena; Attendance: 43,187; Referee: Nick Walsh (Scotland)

21 October 2026 3	Real Madrid (Spain)	4–1	(Germany) RB Leipzig	Madrid, Spain
21:00 CEST (UTC+2)	Silva 44'; Güler 52'; Carreras (yellow card) 68'; Mbappé 83'; Diomande 87'	Report	Reitz (yellow card) 70'; Gomis 85'	Stadium: Bernabéu; Attendance: 73,016; Referee: István Kovács (Romania)

4 November 2026 4	RB Leipzig (Germany)	2–3	(England) Manchester City	Leipzig, Germany
21:00 CET (UTC+1)	Baumgartner (yellow card) 17'; Baku (yellow card) 33', (goal) 49'; El Aynaoui (yellow card) 48'; Nusa 61'; Raum (yellow card) 77'	Report	Lukeba 37' (o.g.); Fernández 58'; Haaland 78'; Doku (yellow card) 88'; Khusanov (yellow card) 90+4'	Stadium: Red Bull Arena; Attendance: 45,228; Referee: Marco Guida (Italy)

24 November 2026 5	RB Leipzig (Germany)	v	(France) Lens	Leipzig, Germany
21:00 CET (UTC+1)		Report		Stadium: Red Bull Arena

8 December 2026 6	Manchester United (England)	v	(Germany) RB Leipzig	Manchester, England
20:00 GMT (UTC+0)		Report		Stadium: Old Trafford

20 January 2027 7	RB Leipzig (Germany)	v	(Ukraine) Shakhtar Donetsk	Leipzig, Germany
21:00 CET (UTC+1)		Report		Stadium: Red Bull Arena

27 January 2027 8	Feyenoord (Netherlands)	v	(Germany) RB Leipzig	Rotterdam, Netherlands
21:00 CET (UTC+1)		Report		Stadium: De Kuip

== Statistics ==
=== Appearances and goals ===
No.	Pos	Nat	Player	Total		Bundesliga		DFB-Pokal		Champions League	
No.	Pos	Nat	Player	Apps	Goals	Apps	Goals	Apps	Goals	Apps	Goals
Goalkeepers
1	GK	(Norway) NOR	Ørjan Nyland	1	0	0	0	1	0	0	0
25	GK	(Germany) GER	Leopold Zingerle	0	0	0	0	0	0	0	0
26	GK	(Belgium) BEL	Maarten Vandevoordt	12	0	7	0	1	0	4	0
Defenders
2	DF	(France) FRA	Abdoul Koné	0	0	0	0	0	0	0	0
3	DF	(France) FRA	Maxime Estève	3	0	2	0	0	0	0+1	0
4	DF	(Hungary) HUN	Willi Orbán	13	2	7	1	2	1	4	0
16	DF	(Germany) GER	Lukas Klostermann	2	0	1	0	0	0	0+1	0
17	DF	(Germany) GER	Ridle Baku	11	3	4+1	2	2	0	3+1	1
22	DF	(Germany) GER	David Raum	13	0	7	0	2	0	4	0
23	DF	(France) FRA	Castello Lukeba	11	0	5	0	2	0	4	0
35	DF	(Germany) GER	Max Finkgräfe	4	0	0+1	0	0+1	0	0+2	0
39	DF	(Germany) GER	Benjamin Henrichs	10	0	2+4	0	0+2	0	0+2	0
45	DF	(France) FRA	Samba Konaté	2	0	0+2	0	0	0	0	0
Midfielders
6	MF	(Democratic Republic of the Congo) COD	Ezechiel Banzuzi	12	2	7	1	2	1	2+1	0
7	MF	(Norway) NOR	Antonio Nusa	13	6	7	4	1+1	1	4	1
8	MF	(Germany) GER	Assan Ouédraogo	2	0	1	0	0	0	0+1	0
10	MF	(Germany) GER	Brajan Gruda	11	2	5	0	1+1	1	3+1	1
13	MF	(Austria) AUT	Nicolas Seiwald	12	0	2+4	0	2	0	2+2	0
14	MF	(Austria) AUT	Christoph Baumgartner	4	2	0+1	0	0+1	2	1+1	0
20	MF	(Germany) GER	Rocco Reitz	9	1	3+1	1	1+1	0	0+3	0
21	MF	(Morocco) MAR	Neil El Aynaoui	11	0	6	0	0+1	0	4	0
30	MF	(Serbia) SRB	Andrija Maksimović	7	2	1+3	1	1	0	1+1	1
47	MF	(Germany) GER	Viggo Gebel	0	0	0	0	0	0	0	0
Forwards
9	FW	(Spain) ESP	Marc Guiu	2	0	0+1	0	0	0	1	0
11	FW	(Belgium) BEL	Johan Bakayoko	4	0	1+2	0	1	0	0	0
18	FW	(Nigeria) NGR	Suleman Sani	0	0	0	0	0	0	0	0
27	FW	(France) FRA	Tidiam Gomis	13	3	2+5	2	2	0	0+4	1
28	FW	(France) FRA	Christopher Nkunku	9	5	4+1	4	0	0	2+2	1
40	FW	(Brazil) BRA	Rômulo	9	3	3+2	3	1	0	3	0
Players transferred/loaned out during the season
9	FW	(Denmark) DEN	Conrad Harder	2	1	0+1	0	0+1	1	0	0
48	MF	(Belgium) BEL	Arthur Vermeeren	2	0	0+1	0	0+1	0	0	0

Last updated: 4 November 2026
Source: Competitions

=== Goalscorers ===
Rank	No.	Pos.	Nat.	Player	Bundesliga	DFB-Pokal	Champions League	Total
1	7	FW	(Norway)	Antonio Nusa	4	1	1	6
2	28	FW	(France)	Christopher Nkunku	4	0	0	4
3	17	DF	(Germany)	Ridle Baku	2	0	1	3
3	27	FW	(France)	Tidiam Gomis	2	0	1	3
5	4	DF	(Hungary)	Willi Orbán	1	1	0	2
5	6	MF	(Democratic Republic of the Congo)	Ezechiel Banzuzi	1	1	0	2
5	10	MF	(Germany)	Brajan Gruda	0	1	1	2
5	14	MF	(Austria)	Christoph Baumgartner	0	2	0	2
5	30	MF	(Serbia)	Andrija Maksimović	1	0	1	2
5	40	FW	(Brazil)	Rômulo	2	0	0	2
11	11	FW	(Denmark)	Conrad Harder	0	1	0	1
11	20	MF	(Germany)	Rocco Reitz	1	0	0	1
Own goals					0	1	0	1
Totals					20	8	5	33

=== Assists ===
Rank	No.	Pos.	Nat.	Player	Bundesliga	DFB-Pokal	Champions League	Total
1	7	FW	(Norway)	Antonio Nusa	4	1	0	5
2	6	MF	(Democratic Republic of the Congo)	Ezechiel Banzuzi	3	1	0	4
3	28	FW	(France)	Christopher Nkunku	1	0	2	3
4	10	MF	(Germany)	Brajan Gruda	1	0	1	2
4	27	FW	(France)	Tidiam Gomis	2	0	0	2
6	4	DF	(Hungary)	Willi Orbán	0	1	0	1
6	14	MF	(Austria)	Christoph Baumgartner	0	0	1	1
6	20	MF	(Germany)	Rocco Reitz	0	1	0	1
6	21	MF	(Morocco)	Neil El Aynaoui	1	0	0	1
6	22	DF	(Germany)	David Raum	0	1	0	1
6	30	MF	(Serbia)	Andrija Maksimović	1	0	0	1
6	39	DF	(Germany)	Benjamin Henrichs	1	0	0	1
6	40	FW	(Brazil)	Rômulo	1	0	0	1
Totals					15	5	4	24
