= 2025–26 RB Leipzig season =

RB Leipzig
2025–26 season
- Owner: Red Bull GmbH
- Chairman: Johann Plenge
- Head coach: Ole Werner
- Stadium: Red Bull Arena
- Bundesliga: 3rd
- DFB-Pokal: Quarter-finals
- Top goalscorer: League: Christoph Baumgartner (13); All: Christoph Baumgartner (17)
- Average home league attendance: 44,164
Home colours	Away colours	Third colours

The 2025–26 season was the 17th season in the history of RB Leipzig, and the club's tenth consecutive season in the Bundesliga. In addition to the domestic league, the club participated in the DFB-Pokal.

== Players ==
=== First-team squad ===
As of 31 March 2026

Note: Flags indicate national team as defined under FIFA eligibility rules; some limited exceptions apply. Players may hold more than one non-FIFA nationality.

No.	Pos.	Nation	Player
1	GK	HUN	Péter Gulácsi (3rd captain)
4	DF	HUN	Willi Orbán
5	DF	FRA	El Chadaille Bitshiabu
6	MF	COD	Ezechiel Banzuzi
7	FW	NOR	Antonio Nusa
9	FW	BEL	Johan Bakayoko
10	MF	GER	Brajan Gruda (on loan from Brighton & Hove Albion)
11	FW	DEN	Conrad Harder
13	MF	AUT	Nicolas Seiwald
14	MF	AUT	Christoph Baumgartner
16	DF	GER	Lukas Klostermann
17	DF	GER	Ridle Baku
18	FW	NGR	Suleman Sani
19	DF	SRB	Kosta Nedeljković (on loan from Aston Villa)
20	MF	GER	Assan Ouédraogo

No.	Pos.	Nation	Player
21	FW	NED	Ayodele Thomas
22	DF	GER	David Raum (captain)
23	DF	FRA	Castello Lukeba
24	MF	AUT	Xaver Schlager (vice-captain)
25	GK	GER	Leopold Zingerle
26	GK	BEL	Maarten Vandevoordt
27	FW	FRA	Tidiam Gomis
33	MF	SRB	Andrija Maksimović
35	DF	GER	Max Finkgräfe
37	MF	GER	Benno Kaltefleiter
39	DF	GER	Benjamin Henrichs
40	FW	BRA	Rômulo
45	FW	FRA	Samba Konaté
47	MF	GER	Viggo Gebel
49	FW	CIV	Yan Diomande

=== Players out on loan ===
Note: Flags indicate national team as defined under FIFA eligibility rules; some limited exceptions apply. Players may hold more than one non-FIFA nationality.

No.	Pos.	Nation	Player
—	GK	GER	Timo Schlieck (at Greuther Fürth until 30 June 2026)
—	DF	BEL	Joyeux Masanka Bungi (at New York Red Bulls until 30 June 2026)
—	DF	NED	Lutsharel Geertruida (at Sunderland until 30 June 2026)
—	DF	GER	Frederik Jäkel (at Eintracht Braunschweig until 30 June 2026)
—	DF	FRA	Abdoul Koné (at Reims until 30 June 2026)

No.	Pos.	Nation	Player
—	DF	NOR	Jonathan Norbye (at Fredrikstad until 31 December 2026)
—	MF	MKD	Eljif Elmas (at Napoli until 30 June 2026)
—	MF	BEL	Arthur Vermeeren (at Marseille until 30 June 2026)
—	FW	BEL	Loïs Openda (at Juventus until 30 June 2026)
—	FW	GER	Robert Ramšak (at SV Sandhausen until 30 June 2026)

== Transfers ==
=== In ===
Date	Pos.	Player	From	Fee	Source
1 July 2025	MF	(Netherlands) Ezechiel Banzuzi	(Belgium) OH Leuven	€16,000,000	
3 July 2025	DF	(Germany) Max Finkgräfe	(Germany) 1. FC Köln	€4,000,000	
16 July 2025	FW	(Belgium) Johan Bakayoko	(Netherlands) PSV Eindhoven	€18,000,000	
16 July 2025	FW	(Ivory Coast) Yan Diomande	(Spain) Leganés	€20,000,000	
16 July 2025	MF	(Serbia) Andrija Maksimović	(Serbia) Red Star Belgrade	€14,000,000	
15 August 2025	FW	(Brazil) Rômulo	(Turkey) Göztepe	€20,000,000	
1 September 2025	FW	(Denmark) Conrad Harder	(Portugal) Sporting CP	€24,000,000	
13 January 2026	FW	(Nigeria) Suleman Sani	(Slovakia) Trenčín	€5,000,000	
29 January 2026	DF	(France) Abdoul Koné	(France) Reims	€17,000,000	
2 February 2026	MF	(Germany) Brajan Gruda	(England) Brighton & Hove Albion	Loan	
2 February 2026	FW	(Netherlands) Ayodele Thomas	(Netherlands) Jong PSV	€400,000	
▼ Spending: €138,400,000

=== Out ===
Date	Pos.	Player	To	Fee	Source
1 July 2025	GK	(Germany) Fernando Dickes	(Germany) Hamburger SV	Free	
1 July 2025	DF	(Germany) Leon Koß	(Germany) SC Freiburg II	Free	
1 July 2025	MF	(Guinea) Ilaix Moriba	(Spain) Celta Vigo	€6,000,000	
1 July 2025	DF	(Norway) Jonathan Norbye	(Germany) Arminia Bielefeld	Loan	
1 July 2025	GK	(Germany) Timo Schlieck	(Germany) Greuther Fürth	Loan	
4 July 2025	DF	(Germany) Frederik Jäkel	(Germany) Eintracht Braunschweig	Loan	
13 July 2025	FW	(Denmark) Yussuf Poulsen	(Germany) Hamburger SV	€1,000,000	
17 July 2025	FW	(Czech Republic) Yannick Eduardo	(Netherlands) Dordrecht	Loan	
8 August 2025	DF	(Germany) Tim Köhler	(Germany) VfB Stuttgart II	Undisclosed	
9 August 2025	FW	(Slovenia) Benjamin Šeško	(England) Manchester United	€76,500,000 (Note: Fee may eventually rise to £85,000,000.)	
9 August 2025	MF	(Germany) Nuha Jatta	(Germany) VfB Stuttgart II	Undisclosed	
11 August 2025	GK	(Germany) Janis Blaswich	(Germany) Bayer Leverkusen	€2,000,000	
18 August 2025	FW	(Portugal) André Silva	(Spain) Elche	€1,000,000	
29 August 2025	MF	(Netherlands) Xavi Simons	(England) Tottenham Hotspur	€65,000,000	
31 August 2025	MF	(Belgium) Arthur Vermeeren	(France) Marseille	Loan (€3,000,000)	
1 September 2025	MF	(North Macedonia) Eljif Elmas	(Italy) Napoli	Loan (€2,000,000)	
1 September 2025	DF	(Netherlands) Lutsharel Geertruida	(England) Sunderland	Loan	
1 September 2025	FW	(Germany) Robert Ramšak	(Germany) Eintracht Braunschweig	Loan	
1 September 2025	FW	(Belgium) Loïs Openda	(Italy) Juventus	Loan (€3,300,000)	
23 December 2025	MF	(Mali) Amadou Haidara	(France) Lens	€2,000,000	
29 January 2026	DF	(France) Abdoul Koné	(France) Reims	Loan	
29 January 2026	FW	(Germany) Timo Werner	(United States) San Jose Earthquakes	Free	
31 January 2026	MF	(Slovenia) Kevin Kampl	Retired		
2 February 2026	FW	(Germany) Robert Ramšak	(Germany) SV Sandhausen	Loan	
2 February 2026	FW	(Czech Republic) Yannick Eduardo	(Netherlands) Dordrecht	€500,000	
26 February 2026	DF	(Belgium) Joyeux Masanka Bungi	(United States) New York Red Bulls	Loan	
▲ Income: €162,300,000

== Competitions ==
=== Overall record ===
Competition	First match	Last match	Starting round	Final position	Record							
Competition	First match	Last match	Starting round	Final position	Pld	W	D	L	GF	GA	GD	Win %
Bundesliga	22 August 2025	16 May 2026	Matchday 1	3rd	34	20	5	9	66	47	+19	58.82
DFB-Pokal	16 August 2025	11 February 2026	First round	Quarter-finals	4	3	0	1	11	6	+5	75.00
Total					38	23	5	10	77	53	+24	60.53

Source: Soccerway

=== Bundesliga ===
==== League table ====
Pos	Team	Pld	W	D	L	GF	GA	GD	Pts	Qualification or relegation
1	Bayern Munich (C)	34	28	5	1	122	36	+86	89	Qualification for the Champions League league phase
2	Borussia Dortmund	34	22	7	5	70	34	+36	73	Qualification for the Champions League league phase
3	RB Leipzig	34	20	5	9	66	47	+19	65	Qualification for the Champions League league phase
4	VfB Stuttgart	34	18	8	8	71	49	+22	62	Qualification for the Champions League league phase
5	TSG Hoffenheim	34	18	7	9	65	52	+13	61	Qualification for the Europa League league phase (Note: The 2025–26 DFB-Pokal winners qualified for the Europa League league phase. Since the DFB-Pokal winners, Bayern Munich, qualified for the Champions League, the Europa League spot passed to the sixth-placed team, and the Conference League spot passed to the seventh-placed team.)

Source: Bundesliga
Rules for classification: 1) Points; 2) Goal difference; 3) Goals scored; 4) Head-to-head results; 5) Head-to-head away goals scored; 6) Away goals scored; 7) Play-off.
(Rules 4–6 only apply after home and away matches have been played between the tied teams.)
(C) Champions

==== Results summary ====
Overall								Home						Away					
Pld	W	D	L	GF	GA	GD	Pts	W	D	L	GF	GA	GD	W	D	L	GF	GA	GD
34	20	5	9	66	47	+19	65	12	2	3	40	20	+20	8	3	6	26	27	−1

Source: DFB

==== Results by round ====
Round	1	2	3	4	5	6	7	8	9	10	11	12	13	14	15	17	18	19	16^{1}	20	21	22	23	24	25	26	27	28	29	30	31	32	33	34
Ground	A	H	A	H	A	A	H	A	H	A	H	A	H	A	H	H	H	A	A	H	A	H	H	A	H	A	H	A	H	A	H	A	H	A
Result	L	W	W	W	W	D	W	W	W	L	W	D	W	L	L	W	L	W	D	L	W	D	D	W	W	L	W	W	W	W	W	L	W	L
Position	18	11	7	3	3	3	2	2	2	2	2	2	2	2	4	3	5	5	4	5	4	5	5	5	5	5	4	3	4	3	3	3	3	3

Source: DFB
A = Away; H = Home; W = Win; D = Draw; L = Loss

^{1} Matchday 16 (vs FC St. Pauli) was postponed due to weather-related safety concerns.

==== Matches ====
The match schedule was released on 27 June 2025.

22 August 2025 1	Bayern Munich	6–0	RB Leipzig	Munich
20:30 CEST (UTC+2)	Olise 27', 42', (yellow card) 87'; Díaz 32'; Tah (yellow card) 49'; Laimer (yellow card) 63'; Kane 64', 74', 78'; Kimmich (yellow card) 69'	Report	Orbán (yellow card) 34'	Stadium: Allianz Arena; Attendance: 75,000; Referee: Florian Badstübner

30 August 2025 2	RB Leipzig	2–0	1. FC Heidenheim	Leipzig
15:30 CEST (UTC+2)	Banzuzi (yellow card) 19'; Baumgartner 48'; Raum (yellow card) 61'; Rômulo 78'	Report	Föhrenbach (yellow card) 17'; Kaufmann (yellow card) 51'; Busch (yellow card) 55'; Kerber (yellow card) 59'; Conteh (yellow card) 66'	Stadium: Red Bull Arena; Attendance: 43,495; Referee: Frank Willenborg

13 September 2025 3	Mainz 05	0–1	RB Leipzig	Mainz
15:30 CEST (UTC+2)	Bell (yellow card) 7'	Report	Bakayoko 40'	Stadium: Mewa Arena; Attendance: 33,000; Referee: Sven Jablonski

20 September 2025 4	RB Leipzig	3–1	1. FC Köln	Leipzig
18:30 CEST (UTC+2)	Ouédraogo 13'; Rômulo 44'; Raum 45+4'; Baku (yellow card) 69'	Report	Thielmann 23'; Martel (yellow card) 45+3'	Stadium: Red Bull Arena; Attendance: 47,117; Referee: Benjamin Brand

27 September 2025 5	VfL Wolfsburg	0–1	RB Leipzig	Wolfsburg
15:30 CEST (UTC+2)	Arnold (yellow card) 58'; Koulierakis (yellow card) 90'	Report	Bakayoko 8'; Diomande (yellow card) 24'; Orbán (yellow card) 45'	Stadium: Volkswagen Arena; Attendance: 23,236; Referee: Robin Braun

4 October 2025 6	Borussia Dortmund	1–1	RB Leipzig	Dortmund
15:30 CEST (UTC+2)	Schlotterbeck (yellow card) 6'; Couto 23'	Report	Baumgartner 7', (yellow card) 21'; Baku (yellow card) 54'; Banzuni (yellow card) 86'	Stadium: Signal Iduna Park; Attendance: 81,365; Referee: Sascha Stegemann

18 October 2025 7	RB Leipzig	2–1	Hamburger SV	Leipzig
15:30 CEST (UTC+2)	Baumgartner (yellow card) 43', (goal) 45', 50'; Diomande (yellow card) 79'; Harder (yellow card) 90+5'	Report	Capaldo (yellow card) 18'; Sambi Lokonga 48'	Stadium: Red Bull Arena; Attendance: 47,800; Referee: Tobias Welz

25 October 2025 8	FC Augsburg	0–6	RB Leipzig	Augsburg
15:30 CEST (UTC+2)	Claude-Maurice (yellow card) 24'; Banks (yellow card) 28'; Dardari (yellow card) 89'	Report	Diomande 10'; Rômulo 18'; Nusa 22'; Baumgartner 38'; Ouédraogo 56'; Lukeba 65'; Schlager (yellow card) 90+2'	Stadium: WWK Arena; Attendance: 28,600; Referee: Daniel Siebert

1 November 2025 9	RB Leipzig	3–1	VfB Stuttgart	Leipzig
15:30 CET (UTC+1)	Baumgartner (yellow card) 38'; Chabot 45' (o.g.); Diomande 53'; Rômulo 90+1'	Report	Undav (yellow card) 57'; Tomás 65'; Hendriks (yellow card) 84'	Stadium: Red Bull Arena; Attendance: 47,800; Referee: Sven Jablonski

8 November 2025 10	TSG Hoffenheim	3–1	RB Leipzig	Sinsheim
15:30 CET (UTC+1)	Bernardo (yellow card) 6'; Hajdari 20'; Lemperle 38', (yellow card) 72'; Avdullahu (yellow card) 41'; Prömel 79'	Report	Diomande 9'; Raum (yellow card) 12'; Bakayoko (yellow card) 90'	Stadium: Rhein-Neckar-Arena; Attendance: 26,561; Referee: Patrick Ittrich

23 November 2025 11	RB Leipzig	2–0	Werder Bremen	Leipzig
15:30 CET (UTC+1)	Harder (yellow card) 41'; Ouédraogo 63'; Schlager 80'	Report	Friedl (yellow card) 19'; Pieper (yellow card) 69'	Stadium: Red Bull Arena; Attendance: 47,800; Referee: Martin Petersen

28 November 2025 12	Borussia Mönchengladbach	0–0	RB Leipzig	Mönchengladbach
20:30 CET (UTC+1)		Report	Baumgartner (yellow card) 45'; Baku (yellow card) 52'; Schlager (yellow card) 61'	Stadium: Borussia-Park; Attendance: 50,029; Referee: Timo Gerach

6 December 2025 13	RB Leipzig	6–0	Eintracht Frankfurt	Leipzig
18:30 CET (UTC+1)	Harder 5'; Baumgartner 31'; Diomande 47', 55', 65'; Raum (yellow card) 53', (goal) 62' (pen.)	Report	Theate (yellow card) 68'; Collins (yellow card) 85'	Stadium: Red Bull Arena; Attendance: 47,012; Referee: Daniel Siebert

12 December 2025 14	Union Berlin	3–1	RB Leipzig	Berlin
20:30 CET (UTC+1)	Haberer (yellow card) 37'; Doekhi (yellow card) 55'; Burke 57'; Ansah 64'; Skarke 90+3'	Report	Raum (yellow card) 50'; Gomis 60'; Harder (yellow card) 73'	Stadium: Stadion An der Alten Försterei; Attendance: 22,012; Referee: Daniel Schlager

20 December 2025 15	RB Leipzig	1–3	Bayer Leverkusen	Leipzig
18:30 CET (UTC+1)	Schlager 35'; Lukeba (yellow card) 90+11'	Report	Arthur (yellow card) 31'; Terrier 40'; Schick 44'; Tape (yellow card) 87'; Culbreath 90+7'	Stadium: Red Bull Arena; Attendance: 46,053; Referee: Benjamin Brand

14 January 2026 17	RB Leipzig	2–0	SC Freiburg	Leipzig
20:30 CET (UTC+1)	Orbán 53'; Rômulo 56'	Report	Suzuki (yellow card) 14'; Treu (yellow card) 52'; Beste (yellow card) 77'; Eggestein (yellow card) 90+6'	Stadium: Red Bull Arena; Attendance: 30,902; Referee: Robert Hartmann

17 January 2026 18	RB Leipzig	1–5	Bayern Munich	Leipzig
18:30 CET (UTC+1)	Rômulo 20'; Seiwald (yellow card) 29'	Report	Gnabry 50'; Kane 67'; Tah 83'; Pavlović 85'; Olise 88'	Stadium: Red Bull Arena; Attendance: 47,800; Referee: Sascha Stegemann

24 January 2026 19	1. FC Heidenheim	0–3	RB Leipzig	Heidenheim
15:30 CET (UTC+1)	Gimber (yellow card) 89'	Report	Baku 62'; Nusa 68'; Raum 78'	Stadium: Voith-Arena; Attendance: 14,000; Referee: Tobias Stieler

27 January 2026 16	FC St. Pauli	1–1	RB Leipzig	St. Pauli
20:30 CET (UTC+1)	Kaars 90+3' (pen.)	Report	Baumgartner (yellow card) 49'; Diomande 66'	Stadium: Millerntor-Stadion; Attendance: 29,147; Referee: Florian Exner
Note: The match was originally scheduled for 10 January 2026, but was postponed due to weather-related safety concerns.

31 January 2026 20	RB Leipzig	1–2	Mainz 05	Leipzig
15:30 CET (UTC+1)	Harder 40'	Report	Bell (yellow card) 38'; Posch (yellow card) 45+3'; Amiri 45+6' (pen.); Silas 49'; Potulski (yellow card) 90+3'; Weiper (yellow card) 90+6'	Stadium: Red Bull Arena; Attendance: 35,487; Referee: Daniel Schlager

8 February 2026 21	1. FC Köln	1–2	RB Leipzig	Cologne
15:30 CET (UTC+1)	Thielmann 51', (yellow card) 58'	Report	Baumgartner 29', 56', (yellow card) 76'; Raum (yellow card) 76'; Banzuzi (yellow card) 90+1'; Gulácsi (yellow card) 90+4'	Stadium: RheinEnergieStadion; Attendance: 49,000; Referee: Frank Willenborg

15 February 2026 22	RB Leipzig	2–2	VfL Wolfsburg	Leipzig
17:30 CET (UTC+1)	Schlager (yellow card) 63'; Diomande 70'; Gruda 88'	Report	Kumbedi (yellow card) 48'; Amoura 52'; Svanberg 78'	Stadium: Red Bull Arena; Attendance: 35,787; Referee: Matthias Jöllenbeck

21 February 2026 23	RB Leipzig	2–2	Borussia Dortmund	Leipzig
18:30 CET (UTC+1)	Baumgartner 20', 39', (yellow card) 76'; Rômulo (yellow card) 30'; Lukeba (yellow card) 41'; Raum (yellow card) 90+3'	Report	Bensebaini (yellow card) 45+2'; Rômulo 50' (o.g.); Reggiani (yellow card) 54'; Ryerson (yellow card) 69'; Silva (yellow card) 78', (goal) 90+5'	Stadium: Red Bull Arena; Attendance: 47,800; Referee: Benjamin Brand

1 March 2026 24	Hamburger SV	1–2	RB Leipzig	Hamburg
19:30 CET (UTC+1)	Vieira 22'; Otele (yellow card) 45+3'; Muheim (yellow card) 81'; Poulsen (yellow card) 82'	Report	Orbán (yellow card) 31'; Rômulo 36', (penalty missed) 63', (yellow card) 63'; Diomande 50'	Stadium: Volksparkstadion; Attendance: 57,000; Referee: Bastian Dankert

7 March 2026 25	RB Leipzig	2–1	FC Augsburg	Leipzig
15:30 CET (UTC+1)	Diomande 76'; Chaves 90+2' (o.g.)	Report	Schlotterbeck (penalty missed) 23'; Fellhauer 39'; Banks (yellow card) 62'; Giannoulis (yellow card) 78'	Stadium: Red Bull Arena; Attendance: 41,563; Referee: Martin Petersen

15 March 2026 26	VfB Stuttgart	1–0	RB Leipzig	Stuttgart
19:30 CET (UTC+1)	Undav 56'; Karazor (yellow card) 68'	Report	Rômulo (yellow card) 39'; Schlager (yellow card) 83'	Stadium: MHPArena; Attendance: 57,500; Referee: Deniz Aytekin

20 March 2026 27	RB Leipzig	5–0	TSG Hoffenheim	Leipzig
20:30 CET (UTC+1)	Orbán (yellow card) 15'; Gruda 17', 44'; Baumgartner 21', 30'; Henrichs 78'	Report	Bernardo (yellow card) 23'	Stadium: Red Bull Arena; Attendance: 40,980; Referee: Sven Jablonski

4 April 2026 28	Werder Bremen	1–2	RB Leipzig	Bremen
15:30 CEST (UTC+2)	Puertas (yellow card) 73'; Musah 90+4'; Friedl (yellow card) 90+8'	Report	Nusa 15'; Rômulo 52'; Gomis (yellow card) 90+2'	Stadium: Weser-Stadion; Attendance: 40,000; Referee: Robert Hartmann

11 April 2026 29	RB Leipzig	1–0	Borussia Mönchengladbach	Leipzig
15:30 CEST (UTC+2)	Baku (yellow card) 33'; Seiwald (yellow card) 47'; Schlager (yellow card) 78'; Diomande 81'; Gruda (yellow card) 82'	Report	Scally (yellow card) 35'	Stadium: Red Bull Arena; Attendance: 47,800; Referee: Sascha Stegemann

18 April 2026 30	Eintracht Frankfurt	1–3	RB Leipzig	Frankfurt
18:30 CEST (UTC+2)	Larsson 35'	Report	Diomande 27'; Finkgräfe (yellow card) 40'; Nusa 70'; Harder 81'	Stadium: Deutsche Bank Park; Attendance: 58,500; Referee: Bastian Dankert

24 April 2026 31	RB Leipzig	3–1	Union Berlin	Leipzig
20:30 CEST (UTC+2)	Finkgräfe 22'; Rômulo 25'; Baumgartner (yellow card) 35'; Baku 63'	Report	Doekhi 78'; Leite (yellow card) 84'	Stadium: Red Bull Arena; Attendance: 47,800; Referee: Sven Jablonski

2 May 2026 32	Bayer Leverkusen	4–1	RB Leipzig	Leverkusen
18:30 CEST (UTC+2)	Schick 25', 76', 90'; Tella 45'; Tillman (yellow card) 86'	Report	Finkgräfe (yellow card) 14'; Schlager (yellow card) 72'; Baumgartner 80'	Stadium: BayArena; Attendance: 30,210; Referee: Tobias Welz

9 May 2026 33	RB Leipzig	2–1	FC St. Pauli	Leipzig
15:30 CEST (UTC+2)	Lukeba (yellow card) 19'; Schlager 45'; Baumgartner (yellow card) 50'; Orbán 54'	Report	Ceesay 86'	Stadium: Red Bull Arena; Attendance: 47,800; Referee: Benjamin Brand

16 May 2026 34	SC Freiburg	4–1	RB Leipzig	Freiburg
15:30 CEST (UTC+2)	Beste 24'; Matanović 26'; Ginter 47'; Scherhant 75'	Report	Ouédraogo 33'; Baumgartner (yellow card) 77'	Stadium: Europa-Park Stadion; Attendance: 33,600; Referee: Sascha Stegemann

=== DFB-Pokal ===
16 August 2025 First round	SV Sandhausen	2–4	RB Leipzig	Sandhausen
15:30 CEST (UTC+2)	Ampadu 3'; Herrmann 18'; Gipson (yellow card) 29'; Tarnat (yellow card) 82'	Report	Diomande 6'; Orbán 23'; Banzuzi 79'; Simons (yellow card) 90', (goal) 90+6'	Stadium: Hardtwaldstadion; Attendance: 15,000; Referee: Matthias Jöllenbeck

28 October 2025 Second round	Energie Cottbus	1–4	RB Leipzig	Cottbus
20:45 CET (UTC+1)	Biankadi (yellow card) 33'; Engelhardt 86'	Report	Bakayoko 13'; Baumgartner 28', 37'; Baku (yellow card) 47'; Banzuzi 59', (yellow card) 61'; Raum (yellow card) 90+3'	Stadium: Stadion der Freundschaft; Attendance: 19,700; Referee: Tobias Reichel

2 December 2025 Round of 16	RB Leipzig	3–1	1. FC Magdeburg	Leipzig
21:00 CET (UTC+1)	Nusa 19'; Banzuzi (yellow card) 20'; Baumgartner 29', 54'	Report	Mathisen (yellow card) 8'; Gnaka 11' (pen.); Michel (yellow card) 21'	Stadium: Red Bull Arena; Attendance: 41,108; Referee: Felix Zwayer

11 February 2026 Quarter-finals	Bayern Munich	2–0	RB Leipzig	Munich
20:45 CET (UTC+1)	Stanišić (yellow card) 61'; Kane 64' (pen.); Díaz 67'; Pavlović (yellow card) 70'; Laimer (yellow card) 89'	Report	Vandevoordt (yellow card) 62'; Seiwald (yellow card) 69'; Rômulo (yellow card) 70'; Baumgartner (yellow card) 82'	Stadium: Allianz Arena; Attendance: 75,000; Referee: Daniel Siebert

== Statistics ==
=== Appearances and goals ===
No.	Pos	Nat	Player	Total		Bundesliga		DFB-Pokal	
No.	Pos	Nat	Player	Apps	Goals	Apps	Goals	Apps	Goals
Goalkeepers
1	GK	(Hungary) HUN	Péter Gulácsi	23	0	23	0	0	0
25	GK	(Germany) GER	Leopold Zingerle	0	0	0	0	0	0
26	GK	(Belgium) BEL	Maarten Vandevoordt	16	0	11+1	0	4	0
Defenders
4	DF	(Hungary) HUN	Willi Orbán	37	3	33	2	4	1
5	DF	(France) FRA	El Chadaille Bitshiabu	14	0	8+3	0	1+2	0
16	DF	(Germany) GER	Lukas Klostermann	7	0	1+4	0	1+1	0
17	DF	(Germany) GER	Ridle Baku	35	2	28+4	2	3	0
19	DF	(Serbia) SRB	Kosta Nedeljković	6	0	3+2	0	0+1	0
22	DF	(Germany) GER	David Raum	34	3	29+1	3	4	0
23	DF	(France) FRA	Castello Lukeba	29	1	24+2	1	3	0
35	DF	(Germany) GER	Max Finkgräfe	14	1	5+8	1	0+1	0
39	DF	(Germany) GER	Benjamin Henrichs	17	1	3+14	1	0	0
45	DF	(France) FRA	Samba Konaté	1	0	0+1	0	0	0
Midfielders
6	MF	(Netherlands) NED	Ezechiel Banzuzi	28	2	2+22	0	2+2	2
7	MF	(Norway) NOR	Antonio Nusa	35	5	24+7	4	4	1
10	MF	(Germany) GER	Brajan Gruda	14	3	7+6	3	0+1	0
13	MF	(Austria) AUT	Nicolas Seiwald	37	0	31+2	0	4	0
14	MF	(Austria) AUT	Christoph Baumgartner	37	17	32+1	13	3+1	4
20	MF	(Germany) GER	Assan Ouédraogo	20	4	13+6	4	0+1	0
24	MF	(Austria) AUT	Xaver Schlager	30	3	21+5	3	2+2	0
31	MF	(Germany) GER	Faik Sakar	0	0	0	0	0	0
33	MF	(Serbia) SRB	Andrija Maksimović	10	0	0+8	0	0+2	0
47	MF	(Germany) GER	Viggo Gebel	0	0	0	0	0	0
Forwards
9	FW	(Belgium) BEL	Johan Bakayoko	22	3	8+12	2	1+1	1
11	FW	(Denmark) DEN	Conrad Harder	32	3	8+21	3	1+2	0
18	FW	(Nigeria) NGR	Suleman Sani	0	0	0	0	0	0
21	FW	(Netherlands) NED	Ayodele Thomas	0	0	0	0	0	0
27	FW	(France) FRA	Tidiam Gomis	21	1	2+16	1	0+3	0
40	FW	(Brazil) BRA	Rômulo	32	9	27+3	9	2	0
49	FW	(Ivory Coast) CIV	Yan Diomande	36	13	28+5	12	3	1
Players transferred/loaned out during the season
8	MF	(Mali) MLI	Amadou Haidara	0	0	0	0	0	0
10	FW	(Netherlands) NED	Xavi Simons	2	1	1	0	1	1
11	FW	(Belgium) BEL	Loïs Openda	3	0	1+1	0	1	0
36	FW	(Germany) GER	Timo Werner	3	0	0+3	0	0	0
44	MF	(Slovenia) SLO	Kevin Kampl	3	0	0+3	0	0	0

Source: Competitions

=== Goalscorers ===
Rank	No.	Pos.	Nat.	Player	Bundesliga	DFB-Pokal	Total
1	14	MF	(Austria)	Christoph Baumgartner	13	4	17
2	49	FW	(Ivory Coast)	Yan Diomande	12	1	13
3	40	FW	(Brazil)	Rômulo	9	0	9
4	7	FW	(Netherlands)	Antonio Nusa	4	1	5
5	20	MF	(Germany)	Assan Ouédraogo	4	0	4
6	4	DF	(Hungary)	Willi Orbán	2	1	3
6	9	FW	(Belgium)	Johan Bakayoko	2	1	3
6	10	MF	(Germany)	Brajan Gruda	3	0	3
6	11	FW	(Denmark)	Conrad Harder	3	0	3
6	22	DF	(Germany)	David Raum	3	0	3
6	24	MF	(Austria)	Xaver Schlager	3	0	3
12	6	MF	(Netherlands)	Ezechiel Banzuzi	0	2	2
12	17	DF	(France)	Ridle Baku	2	0	2
14	10	FW	(Netherlands)	Xavi Simons	0	1	1
14	23	DF	(France)	Castello Lukeba	1	0	1
14	27	FW	(France)	Tidiam Gomis	1	0	1
14	35	DF	(Germany)	Max Finkgräfe	1	0	1
14	39	DF	(Germany)	Benjamin Henrichs	1	0	1
Own goals					2	0	2
Totals					66	11	77

=== Assists ===
Rank	No.	Pos.	Nat.	Player	Bundesliga	DFB-Pokal	Total
1	22	DF	(Germany)	David Raum	7	2	9
2	49	FW	(Ivory Coast)	Yan Diomande	7	1	8
3	14	MF	(Austria)	Christoph Baumgartner	7	0	7
4	7	MF	(Norway)	Antonio Nusa	5	1	6
5	20	MF	(Germany)	Assan Ouédraogo	3	1	4
5	40	FW	(Brazil)	Rômulo	4	0	4
7	4	DF	(Hungary)	Willi Orbán	0	2	2
7	10	MF	(Germany)	Brajan Gruda	2	0	2
7	17	DF	(Germany)	Ridle Baku	2	0	2
7	19	FW	(Denmark)	Conrad Harder	1	1	2
11	6	MF	(Netherlands)	Ezechiel Banzuzi	1	0	1
11	10	FW	(Netherlands)	Xavi Simons	0	1	1
11	11	FW	(Denmark)	Conrad Harder	1	0	1
11	13	MF	(Austria)	Nicolas Seiwald	1	0	1
11	16	DF	(France)	Lukas Klostermann	1	0	1
11	23	DF	(France)	Castello Lukeba	0	1	1
11	24	MF	(Austria)	Xaver Schlager	1	0	1
11	35	DF	(Germany)	Max Finkgräfe	1	0	1
Totals					44	10	54
