= Assan Ouédraogo =

German footballer (born 2006)

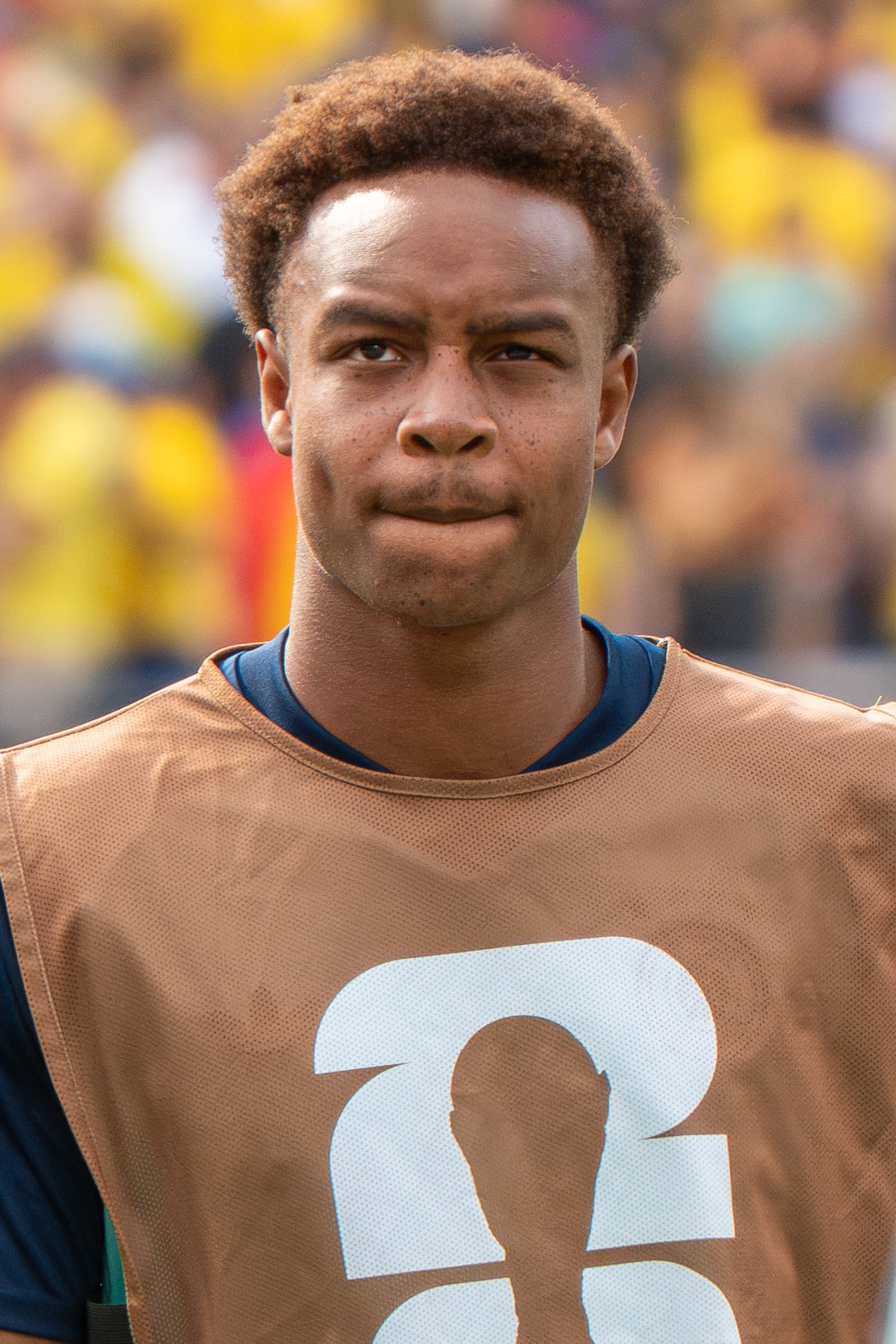
- Ouédraogo with Germany in 2026

Personal information
- Full name: Forzan Assan Ouédraogo
- Date of birth: 9 May 2006 (age 20)
- Place of birth: Mülheim, Germany
- Height: 1.91 m (6 ft 3 in)
- Position: Midfielder

Team information
- Current team: RB Leipzig
- Number: 8

Youth career
- 2011–2014: Union Mülheim
- 2014–2023: Schalke 04

Senior career*
Years	Team	Apps	(Gls)
2023–2024	Schalke 04	17	(3)
2024	Schalke 04 II	1	(0)
2024–	RB Leipzig	23	(4)

International career^{‡}
2021–2022	Germany U16	6	(1)
2022–2023	Germany U17	17	(1)
2024–2025	Germany U19	8	(1)
2025–	Germany U20	2	(1)
2025–	Germany U21	2	(1)
2025–	Germany	1	(1)
Medal record
Men's football
Representing Germany
FIFA U-17 World Cup
Winner	2023 Indonesia
UEFA European Under-17 Championship
Winner	2023 Hungary
- * Club domestic league appearances and goals as of 17:24, 13 September 2026 (UTC) ‡ National team caps and goals as of 22:05, 17 November 2025 (UTC)

Forzan Assan Ouédraogo (born 9 May 2006) is a German professional footballer who plays as a midfielder for Bundesliga club RB Leipzig and the Germany national team.

== Club career ==
=== Schalke 04 ===
Born in Mülheim to Burkinabè parents, Ouédraogo began his career with TuS Union 09 Mülheim, spending three years before a move to Schalke 04 in 2014. He signed a contract extension in November 2022. Ahead of the 2023–24 season, he was promoted to the first team, scoring his first goal in a 2–2 away friendly draw with 1. FC Bocholt on 6 July, also getting the assist for Simon Terodde's goal. He scored in another friendly game as Schalke 04 beat Polish opposition Górnik Zabrze 5–0 on 15 July, and these pre-season performances saw him touted as a player with a lot of potential.

Ouédraogo marked his professional debut in the 2. Bundesliga with a goal; being named as a surprise starter in the away game against Hamburger SV, he received the ball in the penalty area from teammate Simon Terodde, he cut onto his right foot, beating a Hamburger SV defender in the process, before placing the ball beyond goalkeeper Daniel Heuer Fernandes. Despite his team losing 5–3, his first half goal earned him a spot in Schalke 04 history, as he beat Julian Draxler's record as Schalke's youngest goal-scorer in official matches. He also is the youngest player ever of Schalke 04 in competitive and professional matches with an age of 17 years and 80 days, beating Volker Abramczik's record. Following the game, manager Thomas Reis said of Ouédraogo: "it was important that we carefully integrated him into training", also stating that he would give him a "necessary break" and "ground him if [he has] to", highlighting that he did not want to rush Ouédraogo's progress.

=== RB Leipzig ===
On 13 June 2024, Ouédraogo moved to RB Leipzig for a reported fee of €10 million, signing a five-year contract. He rejected a move to Bayern Munich, and subsequently stated that he made the decision for his development, claiming that young players make biggest strides at RB Leipzig. On 20 September 2025, he scored his first goal for the club in a 3–1 win over FC Köln. He continued impressing during the 2025–26 season, earning praise from head coach Ole Werner and Leipzig star man Christoph Baumgartner for his development and hard work; these comments came against the backdrop of a game-winning goal from long range against Werder Bremen. During the same match, Ouédraogo suffered a knee injury which forced him to miss the entire month of December. During his January return against SC Freiburg, Ouédraogo again injured his left knee, necessitating a two-month-long recovery. Ouédraogo returned to the pitch as a substitute on 4 April 2026 against Bremen. He scored once during the season's second half, netting a consolation goal in a 1–4 loss versus Freiburg. Compared to Leipzig's other regular starters during the season, Ouédraogo averaged the highest number of points per match.

== International career ==
Ouédraogo has represented Germany at under-16 and under-17 level. At the 2023 UEFA European Under-17 Championship, he scored the winning penalty as Germany beat France 5–4 in a penalty shoot-out victory in the final. His parents are from Burkina Faso. On 1 November 2023, Ouédraogo was called up to the 2023 FIFA U-17 World Cup held in Indonesia.

In November 2025, he received his first senior call-up from head coach Julian Nagelsmann after Nadiem Amiri was sidelined with an injury, ahead of the 2026 FIFA World Cup qualification matches. On 17 November, he made his debut in a 6–0 victory over Slovakia, scoring just 102 seconds after coming on.

On 5 June 2026, Ouédraogo was called up to Germany's squad for the 2026 FIFA World Cup as a replacement for the injured Lennart Karl.

== Style of play ==
A box-to-box midfielder, Ouédraogo is capable of using both feet, and is lauded for his speed, dribbling, creativity and goal-scoring ability. Ouédraogo can play any position in midfield, possessing dynamism which can often lead to the creation of dangerous goalscoring situations. Due to his height, physicality, technique in tight spaces, and ability to carry the ball forward, Ouédraogo has been likened to players such as Paul Pogba, Ryan Gravenberch and Khépren Thuram.

== Personal life ==
Ouédraogo's father is former Burkina Faso international footballer Alassane Ouédraogo. Ouédraogo is Muslim.

== Career statistics ==
=== Club ===
As of match played 13 September 2026

Appearances and goals by club, season and competition
Club	Season	League			DFB-Pokal		Europe		Total	
Club	Season	Division	Apps	Goals	Apps	Goals	Apps	Goals	Apps	Goals
Schalke 04	2023–24	2. Bundesliga	17	3	0	0	—		17	3
Schalke 04 II	2023–24	Regionalliga West	1	0	—		—		1	0
RB Leipzig	2024–25	Bundesliga	3	0	0	0	2 (Note: Appearances in UEFA Champions League)	0	5	0
RB Leipzig	2025–26	Bundesliga	19	4	1	0	—		20	4
RB Leipzig	2026–27	Bundesliga	1	0	0	0	1	0	2	0
RB Leipzig	Total		23	4	1	0	3	0	27	4
Career total			41	7	1	0	3	0	45	7

=== International ===
As of match played 17 November 2025

Appearances and goals by national team and year
National team	Year	Apps	Goals
Germany	2025	1	1
Total		1	1

Germany score listed first, score column indicates score after each Ouédraogo goal

List of international goals scored by Assan Ouédraogo
No.	Date	Venue	Cap	Opponent	Score	Result	Competition
1	17 November 2025	Red Bull Arena, Leipzig, Germany	1	Slovakia	6–0	6–0	2026 FIFA World Cup qualification

== Honours ==
Germany U17

- UEFA European Under-17 Championship: 2023
- FIFA U-17 World Cup: 2023

Individual

- Fritz Walter Medal U17 Bronze: 2023
