= Samba Konaté =

French footballer (born 2009)

Personal information
- Date of birth: 27 February 2009 (age 17)
- Place of birth: France
- Height: 1.90 m (6 ft 3 in)
- Position: Forward

Team information
- Current team: RB Leipzig
- Number: 45

Youth career
- 2023–2024: ASPTT Marseille
- 2024–2025: Cavigal Nice Football

Senior career*
| Years | Team | Apps | (Gls) |
| 2025– | RB Leipzig | 3 | (0) |

International career^{‡}
| 2025– | France U17 | 2 | (0) |
- * Club domestic league appearances and goals as of 20 September 2026 ‡ National team caps and goals as of 14 October 2025

Samba Konaté (born 27 February 2009) is a French professional footballer who plays as a forward for Bundesliga club RB Leipzig.

== Early life ==
Konaté was born on 27 February 2009. Born in France, he is of Senegalese descent through his parents.

== Club career ==
As a youth player, Konaté played for the youth academies of French sides Le Havre, Marseille, and ASPTT Marseille. Following his stint there, he joined the youth academy of French side Cavigal Nice Football in 2024.

Ahead of the 2025–26 season, he joined the youth academy of German Bundesliga side RB Leipzig and was promoted to the club's senior team in 2025. He made his professional debut on 6 December 2025 as an 87th minute substitute for Yan Diomande, in a 6–0 Bundesliga victory against Eintracht Frankfurt.

== International career ==
Konaté is a France youth international. During October 2025, he played for the France national under-17 football team for 2026 UEFA European Under-17 Championship qualification.

== Career statistics ==
As of match played 20 September 2026

Appearances and goals by club, season and competition
| Club | Season | League | | | DFB-Pokal | | Europe | | Other | | Total | |
| Club | Season | Division | Apps | Goals | Apps | Goals | Apps | Goals | Apps | Goals | Apps | Goals |
|---|---|---|---|---|---|---|---|---|---|---|---|---|
| RB Leipzig | 2025–26 | Bundesliga | 1 | 0 | 0 | 0 | — | | — | | 1 | 0 |
| RB Leipzig | 2026–27 | Bundesliga | 2 | 0 | 0 | 0 | 0 | 0 | — | | 2 | 0 |
| Career total | | | 3 | 0 | 0 | 0 | 0 | 0 | 0 | 0 | 3 | 0 |
