= Abdoul Koné =

French footballer (born 2005)

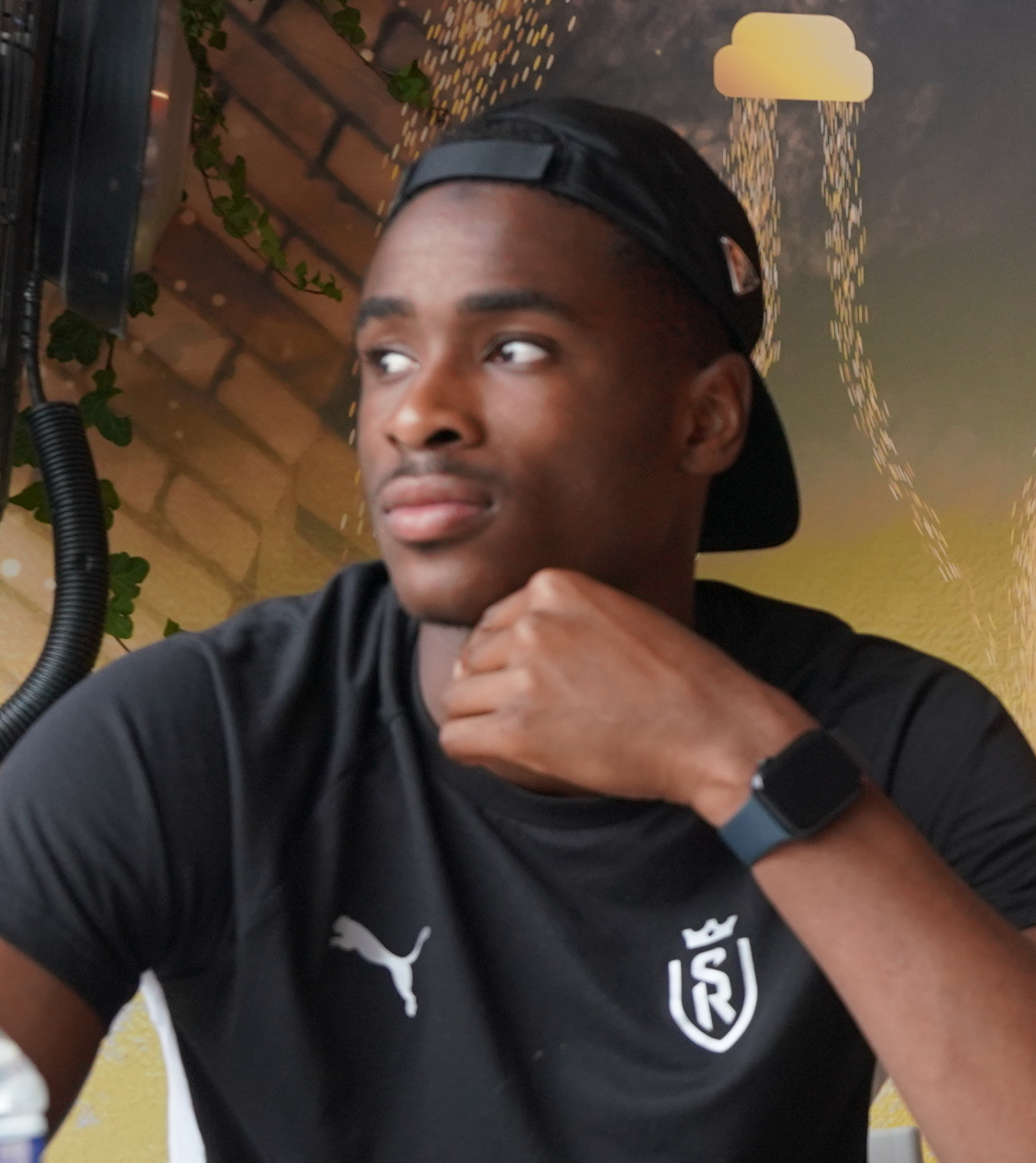
- Koné with Reims in 2025

Personal information
- Date of birth: 22 April 2005 (age 21)
- Place of birth: Neuilly-sur-Seine, France
- Height: 1.92 m (6 ft 4 in)
- Position: Centre-back

Team information
- Current team: RB Leipzig
- Number: 2

Youth career
- 2011–2017: ES Colombienne
- 2017–2020: ACBB
- 2020–2021: RCF Paris
- 2021–2023: Paris FC

Senior career*
Years	Team	Apps	(Gls)
2023–2025	Reims II	13	(1)
2024–2026	Reims	26	(1)
2026–	RB Leipzig	1	(0)
2026	→ Reims (loan)	10	(0)

International career^{‡}
2025–	France U20	4	(0)
- * Club domestic league appearances and goals as of 24 October 2026 ‡ National team caps and goals as of 13 June 2025

Abdoul Koné (born 22 April 2005) is a French professional footballer who plays as a centre-back for Bundesliga club RB Leipzig.

== Club career ==
Koné is a youth product of ES Colombienne, ACBB, RCF Paris and Paris FC, before moving to Reims reserve side in 2023. He made his senior and professional debut with Reims in a 1–0 Ligue 1 win over Marseille on 15 May 2024. On 22 May 2024, he signed his first professional contract with Reims.

On 29 January 2026, Koné signed a five–year contract with German club RB Leipzig. He was immediately loaned to Reims, for the remainder of the season.

== Personal life ==
Born in France, Koné is of Ivorian descent.

== Career statistics ==
=== Club ===
As of match played 24 October 2026

Appearances and goals by club, season and competition
Club	Season	League			National cup		Continental		Other		Total	
Club	Season	Division	Apps	Goals	Apps	Goals	Apps	Goals	Apps	Goals	Apps	Goals
Reims II	2023–24	Championnat National 3	8	0	0	0	—		—		8	0
Reims II	2024–25	Championnat National 3	5	1	0	0	—		—		5	1
Reims II	Total		13	1	0	0	—		—		13	1
Reims	2023–24	Ligue 1	3	0	0	0	—		—		3	0
Reims	2024–25	Ligue 1	5	0	1	0	—		—		6	0
Reims	2025–26	Ligue 2	28	1	0	0	—		—		28	1
Reims	Total		36	1	1	0	—		—		37	1
RB Leipzig	2025–26	Bundesliga	0	0	0	0	—		—		0	0
RB Leipzig	2026–27	Bundesliga	1	0	0	0	0	0	—		1	0
RB Leipzig	Total		1	0	0	0	0	0	—		1	0
Reims (loan)	2025–26	Ligue 2	10	0	—		—		—		10	0
Career total			60	1	1	0	0	0	0	0	61	1

== Honours ==
Reims

- Coupe de France runner-up: 2024–25

France U20

- Maurice Revello Tournament: 2025
