= Andrija Maksimović =

Serbian footballer

Andrija Maksimović Андрија Максимовић
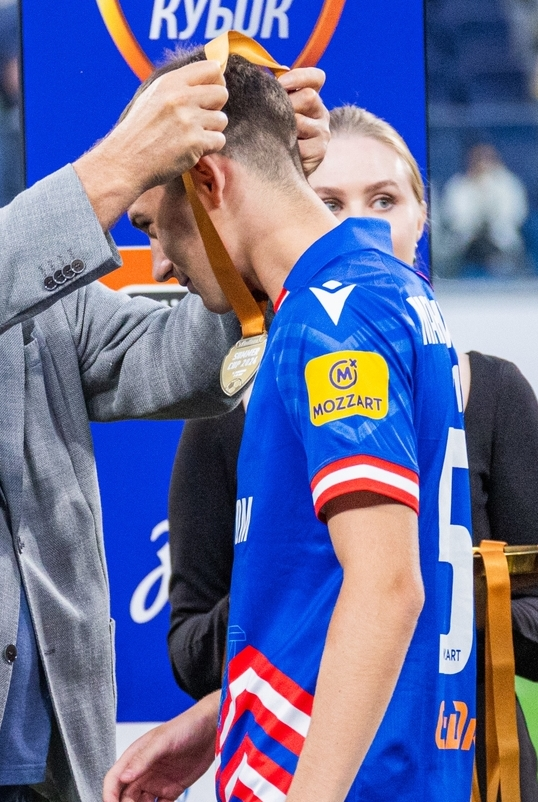
- Maksimović with Red Star Belgrade in 2024

Personal information
- Date of birth: 5 June 2007 (age 19)
- Place of birth: Novi Pazar, Serbia
- Height: 1.82 m (6 ft 0 in)
- Position: Midfielder

Team information
- Current team: RB Leipzig
- Number: 30

Youth career
- Pazar Juniors
- Vlada Dimitrijević
- Red Star Belgrade

Senior career*
Years	Team	Apps	(Gls)
2023–2025	Red Star Belgrade	27	(4)
2023–2024	→ Grafičar Beograd (dual)	29	(9)
2025–	RB Leipzig	13	(1)

International career^{‡}
2021	Serbia U15	2	(0)
2022	Serbia U16	3	(0)
2022–2024	Serbia U17	21	(9)
2024–	Serbia U19	6	(1)
2024–	Serbia	9	(0)
Medal record
Men's football
Representing Serbia
UEFA European Under-17 Championship
Bronze medal – third place	2024 Cyprus
- * Club domestic league appearances and goals as of 22 November 2026 ‡ National team caps and goals as of 10 June 2025

Andrija Maksimović (Serbian Cyrillic: Андрија "Меси" Максимовић; born 5 June 2007) is a Serbian professional footballer who plays as a midfielder for Bundesliga club RB Leipzig and the Serbia national team.

== Early life ==
Maksimović was born in 2007 in Novi Pazar, Serbia. He first played football for FK Pazar Juniors, and played for OFK Vlada Dimitrijević before joining Red Star Youth academy.

== Club career ==
=== Grafičar Beograd ===
In summer 2023, Maksimović was sent on dual registration from Red Star Belgrade to Grafičar Beograd. On 11 August 2023, he made his professional debut at the age of 16 years, 2 months, and 5 days in the Serbian First League match against FK Jedinstvo Ub – whilst scoring his first professional goal as well.

=== Red Star Belgrade ===
On 5 September 2023, Maksimović signed a contract extension with Red Star Belgrade, and was placed on the B list for the 2023–24 UEFA Champions League group stage. On 6 December, he made his first team debut at the age of 16 years, 6 months, and 1 day in the Serbian Cup match against FK Radnički Niš.

On 23 September 2024, Maksimović made his professional Eternal derby debut as a starter at the age of 17 years, 3 months and 18 days in the Serbian SuperLiga match against Partizan Belgrade, and he assisted Silas Katompa Mvumpa's goal, becoming the youngest assistant in the Eternal derby. On 27 September, he extended his contract with Red Star Belgrade until 2027. On 1 October, Maksimović made his UEFA Champions League debut at the age of 17 years, 3 months and 26 days in the league phase match against Inter Milan.

On 12 April 2025, Maksimović scored his first goal in the Eternal derby at the age of 17 years, 10 months and 7 days in the Serbian SuperLiga match against Partizan Belgrade – becoming the youngest scorer in the Eternal derby.

=== RB Leipzig ===
On 16 July 2025, Maksimović signed a five-year contract with RB Leipzig. On 10 September 2026, he scored his first goal for the club in a 4–1 away defeat against Como in the Champions League.

== International career ==
On 12 October 2024, Maksimović made his debut for the Serbia national team at the age of 17 years, 4 months, and 7 days (17 years and 129 days) in the 2024–25 UEFA Nations League A Group 4 match against Switzerland, breaking the previous record for the youngest player to play for the Serbia national team in an official match, set by Mitar Mrkela on 17 November 1982 at the age of 17 years, 4 months, and 7 days (17 years and 130 days) in the UEFA Euro 1984 qualifying against Bulgaria during the former Yugoslavia national team era. He came off as a substitute to Aleksandar Mitrović in the 74th minute, as Serbia won 2–0.

In June 2025, Andrija Maksimović participated in two World Cup qualifying matches against Albania and Andorra. He wasn't a starter in either of those matches.

== Style of play ==
Maksimović is a midfielder known for his dribbling ability.

== Personal life ==
Maksimović is the son of Serbian footballer Mirko Maksimović. He earned the nickname "Mesi" (Serbian Cyrillic: "Меси") due to his resemblance to Lionel Messi with his distinctive long hair as a child. On 15 October 2024, Maksimović was named for The Guardian's Next Generation 2024.

== Career statistics ==
=== Club ===
As of match played 27 October 2026

Appearances and goals by club, season and competition
Club	Season	League			National cup (Note: Includes Serbian Cup, DFB-Pokal)		Europe		Other		Total	
Club	Season	Division	Apps	Goals	Apps	Goals	Apps	Goals	Apps	Goals	Apps	Goals
Red Star Belgrade	2023–24	Serbian SuperLiga	0	0	2	0	0	0	—		2	0
Red Star Belgrade	2024–25	Serbian SuperLiga	27	4	5	2	7 (Note: Appearances in UEFA Champions League)	0	—		39	6
Red Star Belgrade	Total		27	4	7	2	7	0	—		41	6
Grafičar Beograd (loan)	2023–24	Serbian First League	24	6	0	0	—		—		24	6
Grafičar Beograd (loan)	2024–25	Serbian First League	5	3	0	0	—		—		5	3
Grafičar Beograd (loan)	Total		29	9	0	0	—		—		29	9
RB Leipzig	2025–26	Bundesliga	8	0	2	0	—		—		10	0
RB Leipzig	2026–27	Bundesliga	4	1	1	0	2	1	—		7	2
RB Leipzig	Total		12	1	3	0	2	1	—		17	2
Career total			68	14	10	2	9	1	0	0	87	17

=== International ===
As of match played 10 June 2025

Appearances and goals by national team and year
National team	Year	Apps	Goals
Serbia	2024	4	0
Serbia	2025	4	0
Total		8	0

== Honours ==
Red Star Belgrade

- Serbian SuperLiga: 2024–25
- Serbian Cup: 2024–25

Individual

- Serbian SuperLiga Player of the Week: 2024–25 (Round 14)
