= Maarten Vandevoordt =

Belgian footballer (born 2002)

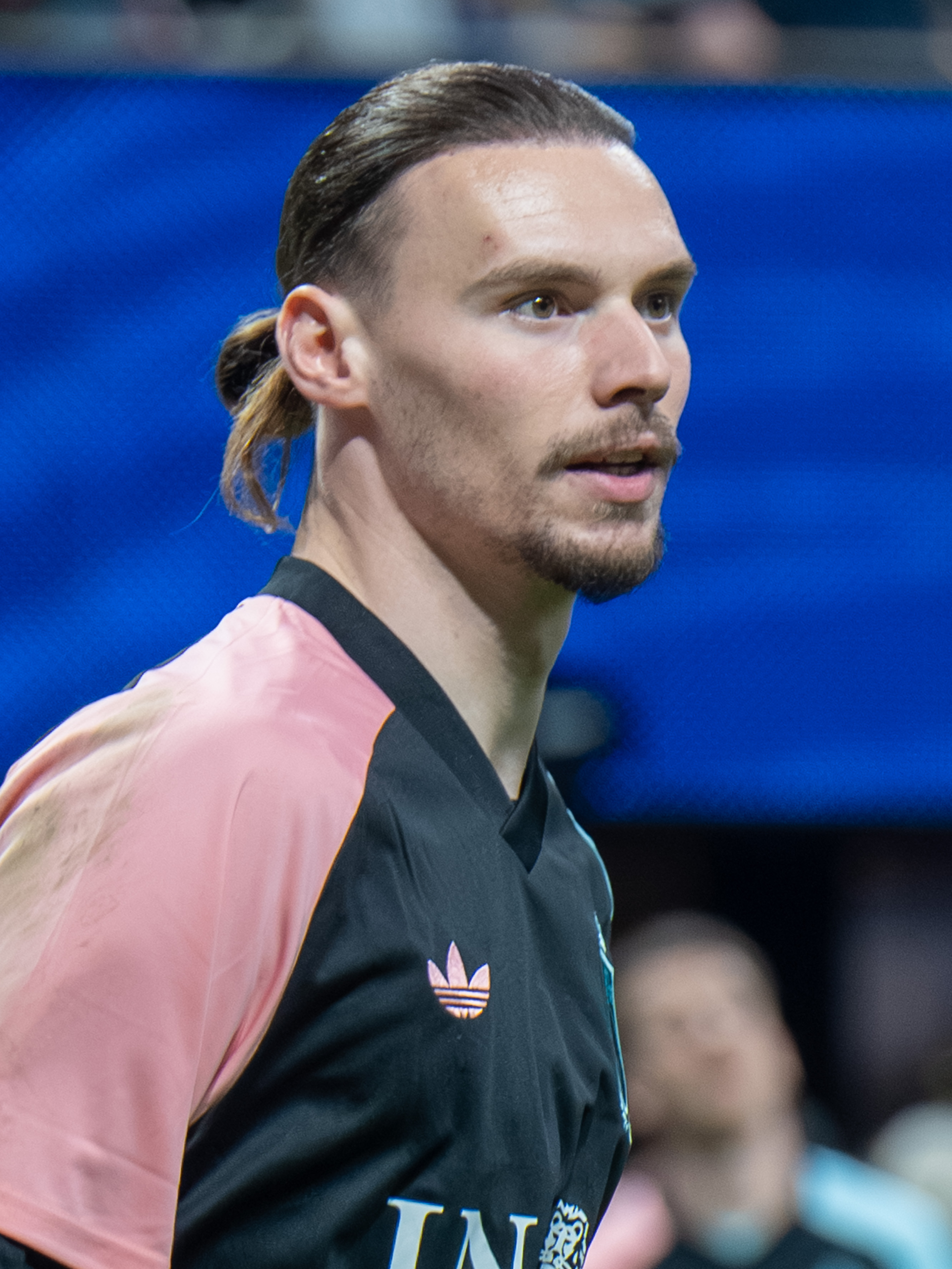
- Vandevoordt in 2026

Personal information
- Date of birth: 26 February 2002 (age 24)
- Place of birth: Sint-Truiden, Belgium
- Height: 1.92 m (6 ft 4 in)
- Position: Goalkeeper

Team information
- Current team: RB Leipzig
- Number: 26

Youth career
- VV Brustem C.
- Sint-Truiden
- –2019: Genk

Senior career*
Years	Team	Apps	(Gls)
2019–2024	Genk	139	(0)
2024–	RB Leipzig	24	(0)

International career^{‡}
2017	Belgium U15	3	(0)
2017–2018	Belgium U16	6	(0)
2018–2019	Belgium U17	12	(0)
2019–2020	Belgium U19	7	(0)
2021–2024	Belgium U21	19	(0)
2026–	Belgium	1	(0)
- * Club domestic league appearances and goals as of 17:30, 31 October 2026 (UTC) ‡ National team caps and goals as of 23:45, 5 October 2026 (UTC)

Maarten Vandevoordt (Dutch pronunciation: [ˈmaːrtə(n) ˈvɑndəˌvoːrt]; born 26 February 2002) is a Belgian professional footballer who plays as a goalkeeper for Bundesliga club RB Leipzig and the Belgium national team.

== Club career ==
=== Genk ===
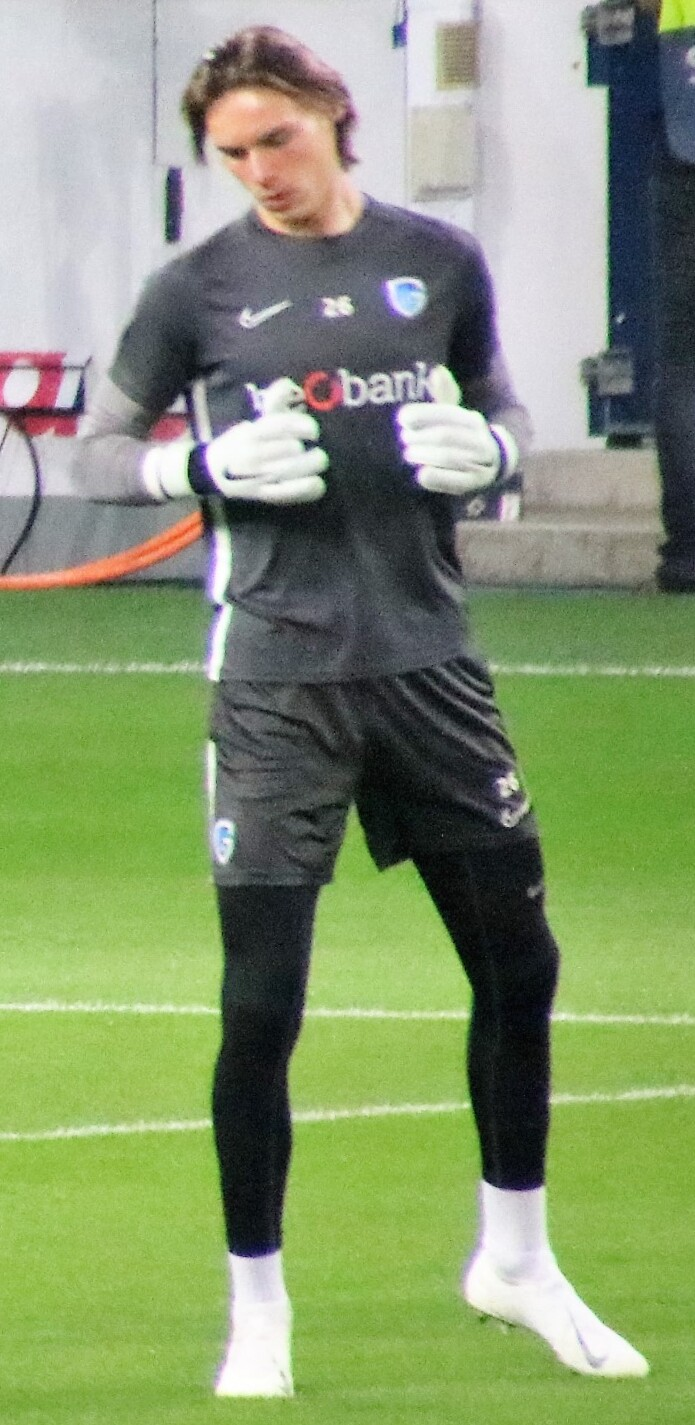
Vandevoordt warming up for the Genk's match in 2019.

On 10 December 2019, Vandevoordt, aged 17 years 287 days, became the youngest goalkeeper in UEFA Champions League history, playing 90 minutes in a 4–0 loss to Napoli.

=== RB Leipzig ===
On 12 April 2022, German club RB Leipzig announced that they had completed a deal to sign Vandevoordt in 2024 on a five-year contract running until 2029.

== International career ==
In October 2024 he was named in the senior Belgium squad for the 2024–25 UEFA Nations League matches against Italy and France on 10 and 14 October 2024, respectively.

On 5 October 2026, Vandervoordt made his debut in a 2026–27 UEFA Nations League A game against France which ended in a 1–4 Belgian loss.

== Career statistics ==
=== Club ===
As of match played 31 October 2026

Appearances and goals by club, season and competition
Club	Season	League			National cup (Note: Includes Belgian Cup, DFB-Pokal)		Europe		Other		Total	
Club	Season	Division	Apps	Goals	Apps	Goals	Apps	Goals	Apps	Goals	Apps	Goals
Genk	2019–20	Belgian Pro League	4	0	2	0	1 (Note: Appearance(s) in UEFA Champions League)	0	0	0	7	0
Genk	2020–21	Belgian Pro League	16	0	4	0	—		—		20	0
Genk	2021–22	Belgian Pro League	38	0	1	0	8 (Note: Two appearances in UEFA Champions League, six appearances in UEFA Europa League)	0	1 (Note: Appearance in Belgian Super Cup)	0	48	0
Genk	2022–23	Belgian Pro League	40	0	3	0	—		—		43	0
Genk	2023–24	Belgian Pro League	41	0	0	0	10 (Note: Two appearances in UEFA Champions League, two appearances in UEFA Europa League, six appearances in UEFA Europa Conference League)	0	—		51	0
Genk	Total		139	0	10	0	19	0	1	0	169	0
RB Leipzig	2024–25	Bundesliga	6	0	4	0	2	0	—		12	0
RB Leipzig	2025–26	Bundesliga	12	0	4	0	—		—		16	0
RB Leipzig	2026–27	Bundesliga	6	0	1	0	3	0	—		10	0
RB Leipzig	Total		24	0	9	0	5	0	—		38	0
Career total			164	0	19	0	24	0	1	0	208	0

=== International ===
As of match played 5 October 2026

Appearances and goals by national team and year
National team	Year	Apps	Goals
Belgium	2026	1	0
Total		1	0

== Honours ==
Genk

- Belgian Cup: 2020–21
