= Conrad Harder =

Danish footballer (born 2005)

Personal information
- Full name: Conrad Harder; Weibel Schandorf
- Date of birth: 7 April 2005 (age 21)
- Place of birth: Holte, Denmark
- Height: 1.85 m (6 ft 1 in)
- Position: Forward

Team information
- Current team: Strasbourg (on loan from RB Leipzig)
- Number: 40

Youth career
- FC Copenhagen
- Nordsjælland

Senior career*
Years	Team	Apps	(Gls)
2023–2024	Nordsjælland	31	(7)
2024–2025	Sporting CP	32	(6)
2025–	RB Leipzig	30	(3)
2026–	→ Strasbourg (loan)	9	(2)

International career^{‡}
2023	Denmark U18	5	(1)
2023–2024	Denmark U19	10	(2)
2024–	Denmark U21	16	(7)
2025–	Denmark	1	(0)
- * Club domestic league appearances and goals as of 17:30, 21 November 2026 (UTC) ‡ National team caps and goals as of 22:15, 6 October 2026 (UTC)

Conrad Harder Weibel Schandorf (born 7 April 2005) is a Danish professional footballer who plays as a forward for Ligue 1 club Strasbourg, on loan from Bundesliga club RB Leipzig, and the Denmark national team.

== Club career ==
=== KB ===
Harder played for the under-14 team for KB.

=== Nordsjælland ===
Harder is a product of FC Nordsjælland where he worked his way up through the youth ranks. After a strong 2022–23 season for the club's U-19 team, scoring 27 goals in 24 games, Harder made his official debut for FC Nordsjælland in the final Danish Superliga match of the 2022–23 season against Viborg FF, when the 18-year-old striker came on for the last three minutes of the match.

He made four appearances in the first four games of the 2023–24 season, where he also scored his first goal for the club, before FC Nordsjælland announced on 5 September 2023, that they had signed a new three-year full-time contract with Harder, who would also be promoted permanently to the first team squad. After a good start to the 2024–25 season, with two goals in Harder's second game of the season, the club confirmed on 22 August 2024 that they had extended Harder's contract until June 2028.

=== Sporting CP ===
On 2 September 2024, Harder joined Primeira Liga club Sporting CP on a five-year contract for a fee of €19 million and a reported €80 million release clause. Prior to signing for Sporting, Harder had attracted interest from Premier League club Brighton & Hove Albion, despite Nordsjælland accepting a bid from them, but upon learning of Sporting's interest, he decided to join them instead.

He made his competitive debut for his new club on 17 September, and also his UEFA Champions League debut, in Sporting's 2–0 victory over Lille during the inaugural matchday of the newly formatted Champions League league phase. Harder scored his first goal in a 3–0 win against AVS five days later. In his first start, on 18 October, Harder scored a brace in a 2–1 over Portimonense in third round of the Taça de Portugal.

On 29 January 2025, he scored his maiden Champions League goal in a 1–1 home draw against Bologna, securing his team's progression to the knockout phase play-offs qualification. Having helped Sporting secure the Primeira Liga title, on 17 May, he came of the bench and scored and assisted in extra-time, to help Sporting defeat crosstown rivals Benfica 3–1 in the Taça de Portugal final, on 25 May, while also completing their first domestic double since the 2001–02 season.

=== RB Leipzig ===
On 1 September 2025, Harder signed for Bundesliga club RB Leipzig on a five-year deal.

==== Loan to Strasbourg ====
On 1 September 2026, Harder joined Ligue 1 club Strasbourg on a one-season loan deal.

== International career ==
On 23 March 2025, Harder made his senior international debut for Denmark as a substitute against Portugal during the 2024–25 UEFA Nations League quarter-finals.

== Career statistics ==
=== Club ===
As of match played 21 November 2026

Appearances and goals by club, season and competition
Club	Season	League			National cup (Note: Includes Danish Cup, Taça de Portugal, DFB-Pokal, Coupe de France)		League cup (Note: Includes Taça da Liga)		Europe		Other		Total	
Club	Season	Division	Apps	Goals	Apps	Goals	Apps	Goals	Apps	Goals	Apps	Goals	Apps	Goals
Nordsjælland	2022–23	Danish Superliga	1	0	0	0	—		—		—		1	0
Nordsjælland	2023–24	Danish Superliga	23	5	5	2	—		5 (Note: Appearances in UEFA Europa Conference League)	0	—		33	7
Nordsjælland	2024–25	Danish Superliga	7	2	0	0	—		—		—		7	2
Nordsjælland	Total		31	7	5	2	—		5	0	—		41	9
Sporting CP	2024–25	Primeira Liga	28	5	7	5	3	0	9 (Note: Appearances in UEFA Champions League)	1	—		47	11
Sporting CP	2025–26	Primeira Liga	4	1	—		—		—		1 (Note: Appearance in Supertaça Cândido de Oliveira)	0	5	1
Sporting CP	Total		32	6	7	5	3	0	9	1	1	0	52	12
RB Leipzig	2025–26	Bundesliga	29	3	3	0	—		—		—		32	3
RB Leipzig	2026–27	Bundesliga	1	0	1	1	—		—		—		2	1
RB Leipzig	Total		30	3	4	1	—		—		—		34	4
Strasbourg (loan)	2026–27	Ligue 1	9	2	0	0	—		—		—		9	2
Career total			102	19	16	8	3	0	14	1	1	0	136	27

=== International ===
As of match played 23 March 2025

Appearances and goals by national team and year
National team	Year	Apps	Goals
Denmark
Denmark	2025	1	0
Total		1	0

== Honours ==
Sporting CP

- Primeira Liga: 2024–25
- Taça de Portugal: 2024–25
