= Tidiam Gomis =

French footballer (born 2006)

Personal information
- Full name: Tidiam Diadie Stephan Gomis
- Date of birth: 8 August 2006 (age 20)
- Place of birth: Meulan-en-Yvelines, France
- Height: 1.82 m (6 ft 0 in)
- Position: Forward

Team information
- Current team: RB Leipzig
- Number: 27

Youth career
- 2014–2015: OFC Les Mureaux
- 2015–2019: ES Bouafle-Flins
- 2019–2023: Caen

Senior career*
Years	Team	Apps	(Gls)
2022–2024	Caen B	16	(4)
2023–2025	Caen	36	(4)
2025–	RB Leipzig	34	(4)

International career^{‡}
2021–2022	France U16	10	(0)
2022–2023	France U17	15	(2)
2023	France U18	12	(3)
2024–	France U19	16	(5)
2025–	France U20	5	(1)
Medal record
Men's football
Representing France
UEFA European Under-19 Championship
Runner-up	2024 Northern Ireland
FIFA U-17 World Cup
Runner-up	2023 Indonesia
UEFA European Under-17 Championship
Runner-up	2023 Hungary
- * Club domestic league appearances and goals as of 31 October 2026 ‡ National team caps and goals as of 15 June 2025

Tidiam Diadie Stephan Gomis (born 8 August 2006) is a French professional footballer who plays as a forward for German Bundesliga club RB Leipzig.

== Club career ==
On 13 September 2022, Gomis signed his first professional contract with Caen, a deal until 2025, becoming the club's youngest ever professional. On 12 August 2023, he made his professional debut in a 2–0 Ligue 2 win over Pau. He became the fourth-youngest player in Caen history. Described as one of the "brightest French players of his generation", Gomis was subject to interest from Bundesliga club Bayer Leverkusen in the final days of the 2023 summer transfer window. Although he agreed personal terms with Leverkusen, Caen rejected all offers for the player.

On 3 February 2025, Gomis signed a four-and-a-half-year contract with RB Leipzig in Germany.

== International career ==
Born in France with Senegalese descent, Gomis is a France youth international. In May 2023, he was selected to play at for the under-17s at the 2023 UEFA European Under-17 Championship, finishing as runners-up. In September 2023, he received his first call-up to the under-18s for the Tournoi de Limoges.

== Career statistics ==
As of match played 31 October 2026

Appearances and goals by club, season and competition
Club	Season	League			National cup (Note: Includes Coupe de France, DFB-Pokal)		Europe		Other		Total	
Club	Season	Division	Apps	Goals	Apps	Goals	Apps	Goals	Apps	Goals	Apps	Goals
Caen B	2022–23	CFA 2	12	1	—		—		—		12	1
Caen B	2023–24	National 3	4	3	—		—		—		4	3
Caen B	Total		16	4	—		—		—		16	4
Caen	2023–24	Ligue 2	16	2	1	0	—		—		17	2
Caen	2024–25	Ligue 2	20	2	2	0	—		—		22	2
Caen	Total		36	4	3	0	—		—		39	4
RB Leipzig	2024–25	Bundesliga	8	0	1	0	—		—		9	0
RB Leipzig	2025–26	Bundesliga	18	1	3	0	—		—		21	1
RB Leipzig	2026–27	Bundesliga	8	3	2	0	3 (Note: Appearances in UEFA Champions League)	0	—		13	3
RB Leipzig	Total		34	4	6	0	3	0	—		43	4
Career total			86	12	9	0	3	0	0	0	98	12

== Honours ==
Caen U18

- Coupe Gambardella runner-up: 2021–22

France U17

- UEFA European Under-17 Championship runner-up: 2023
- FIFA U-17 World Cup runner-up: 2023

France U19

- UEFA European Under-19 Championship runner-up: 2024

France U20

- Maurice Revello Tournament: 2025
