= Brajan Gruda =

German footballer (born 2004)

Personal information
- Full name: Brajan Gruda
- Date of birth: 31 May 2004 (age 22)
- Place of birth: Speyer, Germany
- Height: 1.78 m (5 ft 10 in)
- Position: Attacking midfielder

Team information
- Current team: RB Leipzig (on loan from Brighton & Hove Albion)
- Number: 10

Youth career
- 2010–2015: FV Speyer
- 2015–2018: Karlsruher SC
- 2018–2023: Mainz 05

Senior career*
Years	Team	Apps	(Gls)
2023–2024	Mainz 05	30	(4)
2024–	Brighton & Hove Albion	39	(2)
2026	→ RB Leipzig (loan)	13	(3)
2026–	→ RB Leipzig (loan)	7	(0)

International career^{‡}
2019	Germany U15	1	(0)
2019	Germany U16	1	(0)
2022	Germany U18	2	(2)
2022	Germany U19	7	(4)
2023–	Germany U21	20	(3)
2026–	Germany	2	(2)
Medal record
Men's football
Representing Germany
UEFA European Under-21 Championship
Runner-up	2025 Slovakia
- * Club domestic league appearances and goals as of 7 November 2026 ‡ National team caps and goals as of 21:50, 16 November 2026 (UTC)

Brajan Gruda (German pronunciation: [ˈbʁaɪ̯jan ˈɡʁuːda]; born 31 May 2004) is a German professional footballer who plays as an attacking midfielder for Bundesliga club RB Leipzig, on loan from Premier League club Brighton & Hove Albion, and the Germany national team.

== Club career ==
=== Mainz 05 ===
Born in Speyer, Gruda began his career with local side FV Speyer, before joining Karlsruher SC in 2015. He joined Mainz 05 at the age of 14, and signed his first professional contract with the club in November 2022.

In January 2023, he was promoted to take part in first team training, and made his senior debut on 25 January 2023 in a 2–1 home Bundesliga defeat against Borussia Dortmund. Later that year, on 6 October, he scored his first goal in a 2–2 away draw against Borussia Mönchengladbach.

On 18 May 2024, he scored and assisted in a 3–1 victory against VfL Wolfsburg, confirming Mainz 05's survival in the Bundesliga on the last day of the season.

=== Brighton and Hove Albion ===
On 14 August 2024, Gruda signed for Premier League club Brighton & Hove Albion on a contract until 2028. On 10 May 2025, Gruda scored his first goal in English football in a Premier League match during a 2–0 away win at Wolves.

==== Loans to RB Leipzig ====
On 2 February 2026, Gruda returned to Germany and joined Bundesliga club RB Leipzig, on a six-month loan until the end of the season.

On 13 July 2026, it was announced that Gruda would return to RB Leipzig on a season-long loan for the 2026–27 season.

== International career ==
Gruda is of Albanian descent. He has represented Germany at youth international level.

In September 2023, he was first called up by Germany U21, and he made his U21 debut in a 3–0 victory against Kosovo, he provided three assists in the match.

In May 2024, he trained with the senior national team prior to the UEFA Euro 2024. He departed the training camp on 5 June after a calf injury.

In September 2026, Gruda was one of the players who were called up with the Germany national team by head coach Jürgen Klopp for the 2026–27 UEFA Nations League matches against Netherlands, Greece, Serbia and Greece between 24 September and 4 October 2026, however he had to withdraw from the squad due to injury. In November 2026, Gruda was one of the players who were called up with the Germany national team by head coach Jürgen Klopp for the 2026–27 UEFA Nations League matches against Serbia and the Netherlands on 13 and 16 November 2026, respectively. Against the former in Belgrade, he made his début and scored his side's third goal in an eventual 3-1 victory. After the match, he was immediately given praise by his fellow teammates as well as coach Jürgen Klopp.

== Personal life ==
Gruda is the son of Albanian former Vllaznia player Bujar Gruda. He is also related to fellow footballer Ildi Gruda. His ancestry traces to the Gruda tribe of Northern Albania.

Since Brajan Gruda started playing as a starter for Mainz, the Albanian federation has tried to convince him to play for Albania, but the player has refused. Albanian media have always asked during Sylvinho's press conferences whether Gruda could join the Albanian national team, but he avoided the question by saying "they were working on it".

In October 2024, in an interview on the German national channel, he stated: "I don't know what the future holds, my parents are Albanian but my heart says I want to play for Germany."

In June 2025, coach Alban Bushi stated that he had spoken with Brajan's parents and was in contact with them, saying that Brajan will join Albania only if he doesn’t receive a call-up from Germany.

== Career statistics ==
As of match played 7 November 2026

Appearances and goals by club, season and competition
Club	Season	League			National cup (Note: Includes DFB-Pokal, FA Cup)		League cup (Note: Includes EFL Cup)		Europe		Total	
Club	Season	Division	Apps	Goals	Apps	Goals	Apps	Goals	Apps	Goals	Apps	Goals
Mainz 05	2022–23	Bundesliga	2	0	1	0	—		—		3	0
Mainz 05	2023–24	Bundesliga	28	4	1	0	—		—		29	4
Mainz 05	Total		30	4	2	0	—		—		32	4
Brighton & Hove Albion	2024–25	Premier League	21	1	3	0	1	0	—		25	1
Brighton & Hove Albion	2025–26	Premier League	18	1	1	1	1	1	—		20	3
Brighton & Hove Albion	Total		39	2	4	1	2	1	—		45	4
RB Leipzig (loan)	2025–26	Bundesliga	13	3	1	0	—		—		14	3
RB Leipzig (loan)	2026–27	Bundesliga	7	0	2	1	—		4 (Note: Appearances in UEFA Champions League)	1	13	2
RB Leipzig (loan)	Total		20	3	3	1	—		4	1	27	5
Career total			89	9	9	2	2	1	4	1	104	13

=== International ===
As of match played 16 November 2026

Appearances and goals by national team and year
National team	Year	Apps	Goals
Germany	2026	2	2
Total		2	2

As of match played 16 November 2026
Scores and results list Germany's goal tally first.

List of international goals scored by Brajan Gruda
No.	Date	Venue	Cap	Opponent	Score	Result	Competition
1	13 November 2026	Rajko Mitić Stadium, Belgrade, Serbia	1	Serbia	3–0	3–1	2026–27 UEFA Nations League A
2	16 November 2026	Olympiastadion, Berlin, Germany	2	Netherlands	5–0	5–0	2026–27 UEFA Nations League A

== Honours ==
Germany U21

- UEFA European Under-21 Championship runner-up: 2025

Individual

- Fritz Walter Medal U19 Silver: 2023
