= Joyeux Masanka Bungi =

Belgian footballer (born 2007)

Personal information
- Full name: Joyeux Masanka Bungi
- Date of birth: 24 January 2007 (age 19)
- Place of birth: Berchem-Sainte-Agathe, Belgium
- Height: 1.86 m (6 ft 1 in)
- Position: Defender

Team information
- Current team: VfB Stuttgart II (on loan from RB Leipzig)
- Number: 24

Youth career
- 2017–2022: KRC Genk
- 2023–2025: RB Leipzig

Senior career*
Years	Team	Apps	(Gls)
2025–	RB Leipzig	0	(0)
2026	→ New York Red Bulls (loan)	2	(0)
2026	→ New York Red Bulls II (loan)	5	(0)
2026–	→ VfB Stuttgart II (loan)	0	(0)

International career^{‡}
2022	Belgium U15	5	(0)
2022	Belgium U16	13	(0)
2023	Belgium U17	7	(0)
2024	Belgium U18	3	(0)
2026–	Belgium U19	2	(0)
- * Club domestic league appearances and goals as of 29 August 2026 ‡ National team caps and goals as of 15:36, 13 April 2026 (UTC)

Joyeux Masanka Bungi (born 24 January 2007) is a Belgian professional footballer who plays as a defender for 3. Liga club VfB Stuttgart II, on loan from RB Leipzig.

== Club career ==
=== Youth ===
Born in Berchem-Sainte-Agathe, Masanka Bungi began his career in the youth system of local club KRC Genk in 2017. In 2023, Masanka Bungi joined the RB Leipzig academy, where he would make 56 appearances between the under-17 and under-19 levels, recording 10 goals and eight assists. He played primarily as a left sided midfielder. During this time, he helped the U17 side to the semifinals of the German Championship in 2024. He also played with the under-19s in the UEFA Youth League.

=== RB Leipzig ===
Masanka Bungi signed a first-team contract with RB Leipzig on 7 February 2025.

==== Loan to Red Bull New York ====
On 26 February 2026, Masanka Bungi was sent on a short-term loan through 30 June 2026 to sister-club Red Bull New York.

==== Loan to VfB Stuttgart ====
On 1 September 2026, VfB Stuttgart loaned Masanka Bungi for their reserve team VfB Stuttgart II in 3. Liga.

== International career ==
Masanka Bungi has represented Belgium at the youth level. He has featured for the under-15s, under-16s, under-17s, under-18s and under-19s. As of April 2026, he has made a total of 30 appearances for Belgium youth national teams.

== Career statistics ==
As of match played 30 May 2026

Appearances and goals by club, season and competition
Club	Season	League			National cup		Continental		Other		Total	
Club	Season	Division	Apps	Goals	Apps	Goals	Apps	Goals	Apps	Goals	Apps	Goals
RB Leipzig	2025–26	Bundesliga	0	0	0	0	0	0	—		0	0
New York Red Bulls (loan)	2026	MLS	2	0	0	0	—		—		2	0
New York Red Bulls II (loan)	2026	MLS Next Pro	5	0	—		—		—		5	0
Career total			7	0	0	0	0	0	0	0	7	0
