= Viggo Gebel =

German footballer (born 2007)

Personal information
- Date of birth: 22 November 2007 (age 18)
- Place of birth: Germany
- Height: 1.75 m (5 ft 9 in)
- Position: Midfielder

Team information
- Current team: RB Leipzig
- Number: 47

Youth career
- SC Eintracht Schkeuditz
- –2026: RB Leipzig

Senior career*
Years	Team	Apps	(Gls)
2024–	RB Leipzig	1	(0)
- * Club domestic league appearances and goals as of 30 November 2024

Viggo Gebel (born 22 November 2007) is a German professional footballer who plays as a midfielder for Bundesliga club RB Leipzig. Gebel is known for his technique and game awareness.

== Life and career ==
As a youth player, Gebel joined the youth academy of German side SC Eintracht Schkeuditz. After that, he joined the youth academy of German side RB Leipzig. He started his senior career with German Bundesliga side RB Leipzig. He was described as "impressed when he got his chance" while playing for the club during their pre-season tour of the United States. On 17 August 2024, he debuted for the club during a 4–1 win over Rot-Weiss Essen.

Gebel was born on 22 November 2007 in Germany. He is a native of Leipzig, Germany.

== Career statistics ==
As of match played 30 November 2024

Appearances and goals by club, season and competition
Club	Season	League			DFB-Pokal		Europe		Other		Total	
Club	Season	Division	Apps	Goals	Apps	Goals	Apps	Goals	Apps	Goals	Apps	Goals
RB Leipzig	2024–25	Bundesliga	1	0	2	0	1 (Note: Appearance in UEFA Champions League)	0	—		4	0
RB Leipzig	2026–27	Bundesliga	0	0	0	0	0	0	—		0	0
Career total			1	0	2	0	1	0	0	0	4	0

== Style of play ==
Viggo Gebel mainly operates as a midfielder. He can also operate as a left-winger or right-winger. He specifically operates as an attacking midfielder. Viggo Gebel is currently a young midfielder whose style of play reflects maturity. He combines sharp technical ability with awareness of space, allowing him to glide between defenders and create attacking opportunities with ease. Often operating as an attacking midfielder or winger, Gebel thrives in the half-spaces, linking play and driving his team forward with quick, purposeful movement. His balance, agility, and close control make him a constant threat in one-on-one situations, while his vision and decision-making enable him to set up teammates effectively. Coaches and analysts described him as a very promising player who will definitely make his mark on football.
