= Yan Diomande =

Ivorian footballer (born 2006)

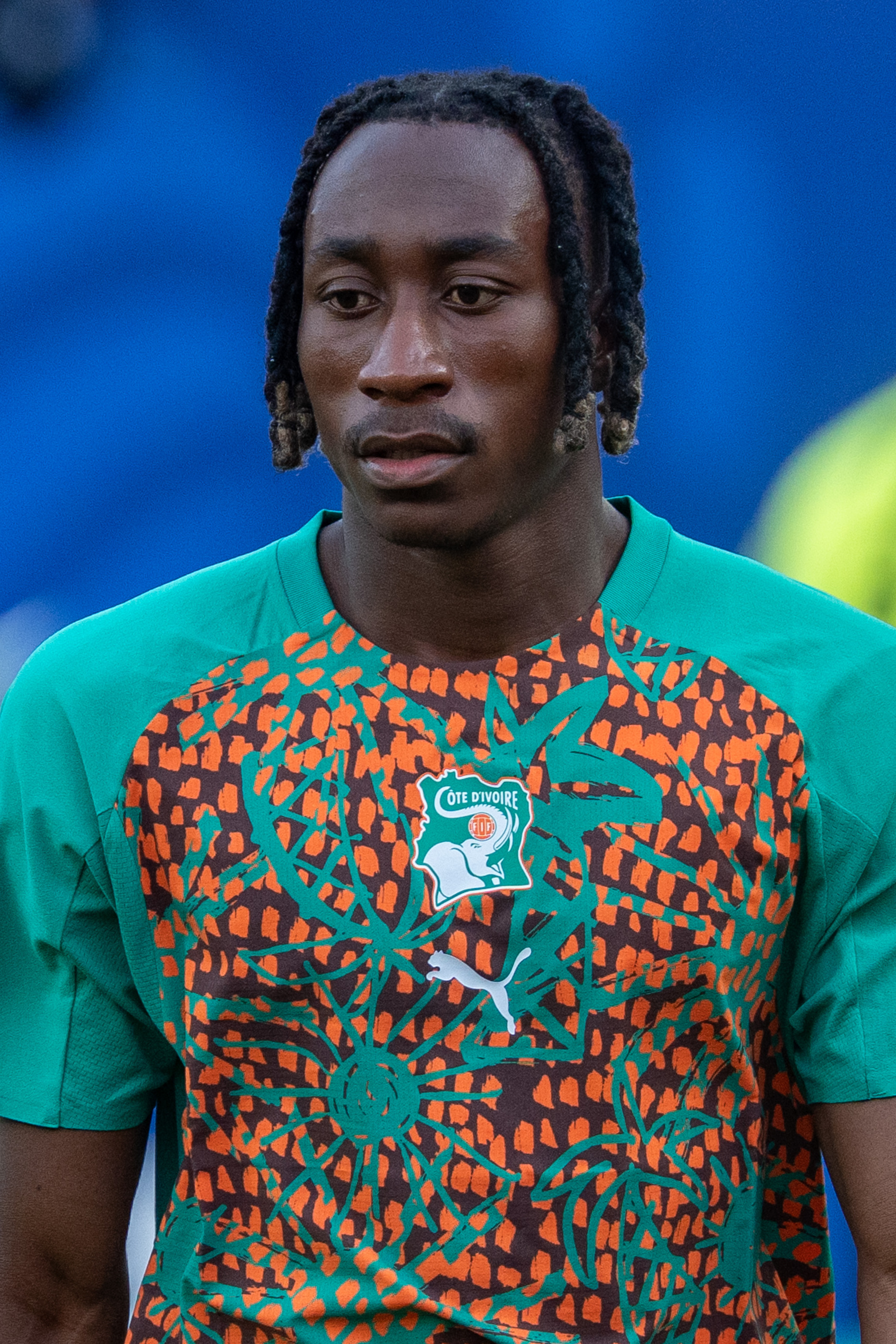
- Diomande with the Ivory Coast in 2026

Personal information
- Date of birth: 14 November 2006 (age 20)
- Place of birth: Abidjan, Ivory Coast
- Height: 1.82 m (6 ft 0 in)
- Position: Winger

Team information
- Current team: Real Madrid
- Number: 25

Youth career
- 2022–2024: DME Academy

Senior career*
| Years | Team | Apps | (Gls) |
| 2025 | Leganés B | 3 | (0) |
| 2025 | Leganés | 10 | (2) |
| 2025–2026 | RB Leipzig | 33 | (12) |
| 2026– | Real Madrid | 13 | (3) |

International career^{‡}
| 2022 | Ivory Coast U17 | 1 | (1) |
| 2025– | Ivory Coast U23 | 1 | (0) |
| 2025– | Ivory Coast | 16 | (3) |
- * Club domestic league appearances and goals as of 22:06, 21 November 2026 (UTC) ‡ National team caps and goals as of 12:21, 14 November 2026 (UTC)

Yan Diomande (born 14 November 2006) is an Ivorian professional footballer who plays as a winger for La Liga club Real Madrid and the Ivory Coast national team.

Diomande started his career in the United States in 2022, before moving to Leganés in January 2025, and six months later to RB Leipzig in July. After one season in Germany, Diomande joined Real Madrid in August 2026 for a club-record transfer worth €125 million (£107 million), becoming the most expensive African player in history.

Diomande represented Ivory Coast at youth level. He made his senior debut in 2025 and was part of the squad for the 2025 Africa Cup of Nations and the 2026 FIFA World Cup, helping his national team reach the knockout stage for the first time in the nation's history.

== Early life ==
Yan Diomande was born on 14 November 2006 in Abidjan, Ivory Coast. He then moved to the United States when he was 15 and joined DME Academy in 2022. At DME, he was named 2023 STARI Player of the Year and had trials with Rangers, Chelsea, Crystal Palace and Bournemouth, as well as a visit to Olympiacos. He cited Cristiano Ronaldo as an early idol and recalled former Crystal Palace players Michael Olise and Eberechi Eze praising him during his trial at the club.

Diomande had a younger sister named Roxane, who passed away aged 15, weeks after his debut with Leganés.

== Club career ==
=== Early career ===
In 2023, Diomande played with AS Frenzi in the United Premier Soccer League Premier Division, helping them win the league title. In October of that year, he went on a trial at Scottish side Rangers, but ended up not signing a contract and returned to the United States.

=== Leganés ===
On 27 November 2024, Diomande agreed to a deal with Spanish side Leganés, officially joining the club in January. Initially a member of the reserves in Tercera Federación, he made his first team – and top tier – debut on 29 March, coming on as a late substitute for Juan Cruz in a 3–2 away loss to Real Madrid. Diomande scored his first professional goal on 11 May, netting his side's second in a 3–2 home win over Espanyol in La Liga.

=== RB Leipzig ===
On 16 July 2025, Diomande signed a five-year contract with Bundesliga side RB Leipzig, after the club paid his €20 million release clause. A month later, on 16 August, he netted his first goal for the club in a 4–2 away win over SV Sandhausen in the DFB-Pokal. On 25 October, he scored his first Bundesliga goal in a 6–0 away win over FC Augsburg. Later that year, on 6 December, he netted a hat-trick in a 6–0 win over Eintracht Frankfurt, becoming the second youngest player to achieve this feat in Bundesliga history behind only Walter Bechtold in 1965.

On 7 March 2026, Diomande scored his tenth Bundesliga goal in a 2–1 victory over Augsburg at the age of 19 years and 114 days, becoming the fourth-youngest player to achieve the feat in a single campaign, behind Olaf Thon, Lukas Podolski and Jadon Sancho. Diomande finished the 2025–26 season with 12 goals and 9 assists, ending just one goal behind the club's top scorer, Christoph Baumgartner. He was named Bundesliga Player of the Month in April 2026, and Bundesliga Rookie of the Month in December 2025 and February 2026.

=== Real Madrid ===
On 6 August 2026, Diomande returned to La Liga, signing for Real Madrid on a seven-year contract until 30 June 2033. The transfer fee was reported at €125 million, with up to €15 million in potential add-ons. The move made him Real Madrid's record signing, surpassing the fee paid for midfielder Jude Bellingham, and the first Ivorian player to sign for Los Blancos. It also broke compatriot Nicolas Pépé's record as the most expensive African player in history. He made his debut on 22 August, coming in as a substitute for Arda Güler in a 2–1 win at Espanyol.

On 10 October, Diomande scored his first goal for the club, which secured a 1–0 win over Villarreal. A week later, he registered a goal and an assist in a 4–1 win against Sevilla, becoming the youngest player to score and assist in the same La Liga match for the club in the 21st century, breaking a record previously held by Jude Bellingham. Three days later, on 21 October, he scored his first UEFA Champions League goal and provided an assist for Kylian Mbappé in a 4–1 victory over former club Leipzig after coming on as a substitute for Vinícius Júnior in the 69th minute. This made him the youngest Real Madrid substitute to score and assist in a UEFA Champions League match, breaking Guti's record set in 1999.

== International career ==
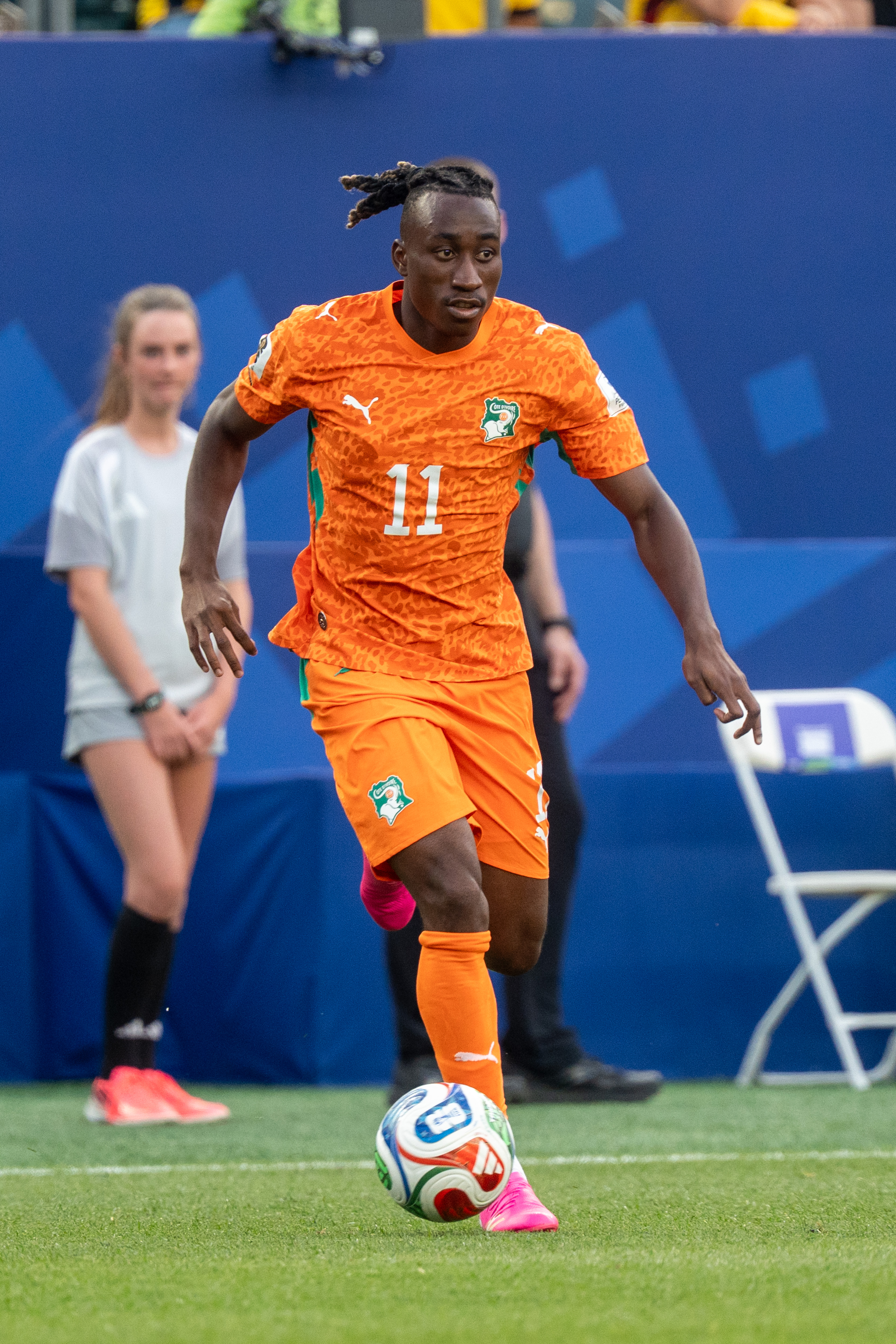
Diomande playing for Ivory Coast at the 2026 FIFA World Cup

On 27 May 2025, Diomande was called up to the Ivory Coast U23s for a friendly. He made his debut for the senior team later that year in a 7–0 FIFA World Cup qualifying win over Seychelles on 10 October 2025, where he scored his first senior international goal. He was named in the squad for the 2025 Africa Cup of Nations.

On 15 May 2026, Diomande was selected by head coach Emerse Faé in Ivory Coast's 26-player squad for the 2026 FIFA World Cup. He started in the opening match against Ecuador, which ended in a 1–0 victory, and was named man of the match for his performance. He also became the youngest player to appear for his country at a World Cup at 19 years and 212 days. On 25 June, he provided an assist in a 2–0 victory over Curaçao, becoming the youngest Ivorian player to achieve this feat at the age of 19 years and 223 days. The win also secured Ivory Coast's first-ever qualification for the knockout stage of the FIFA World Cup.

== Style of play ==
Diomande (in orange) playing for Ivory Coast in 2026

Diomande is an explosive and versatile winger who is capable of operating on either flank. He often looks to receive the ball in wide areas before using his acceleration and strength to drive past defenders or carry the ball into the penalty area. Though primarily right-footed, Diomande is comfortable using both feet, allowing him to cut inside, deliver into the box or finish from different angles.

Diomande has been compared to Sadio Mané and Antonio Nusa for his direct style. He is dynamic and explosive on the ball, using his pace, strength and dribbling to beat defenders in 1v1 situations. He is capable of turning quickly, changing pace and using his close control to evade opponents in tight spaces. He frequently uses a half-turn to shift the ball away from defenders before accelerating into the space behind them. His physicality and ability to carry the ball over long distances also make him particularly dangerous in transition.

== Career statistics ==
=== Club ===
As of match played 21 November 2026

Appearances and goals by club, season and competition
| Club | Season | League | | | National cup (Note: Includes DFB-Pokal) | | Europe | | Other | | Total | |
| Club | Season | Division | Apps | Goals | Apps | Goals | Apps | Goals | Apps | Goals | Apps | Goals |
|---|---|---|---|---|---|---|---|---|---|---|---|---|
| Leganés B | 2024–25 | Tercera Federación | 3 | 0 | — | | — | | — | | 3 | 0 |
| Leganés | 2024–25 | La Liga | 10 | 2 | 0 | 0 | — | | — | | 10 | 2 |
| RB Leipzig | 2025–26 | Bundesliga | 33 | 12 | 3 | 1 | — | | — | | 36 | 13 |
| Real Madrid | 2026–27 | La Liga | 13 | 3 | 0 | 0 | 4 (Note: Appearances in UEFA Champions League) | 1 | 0 | 0 | 17 | 4 |
| Career total | | | 59 | 17 | 3 | 1 | 4 | 1 | 0 | 0 | 66 | 19 |

=== International ===
As of match played 12 November 2026

Appearances and goals by national team and year
| National team | Year | Apps | Goals |
|---|---|---|---|
| Ivory Coast | 2025 | 7 | 2 |
| Ivory Coast | 2026 | 9 | 1 |
| Total | | 16 | 3 |

Scores and results list Ivory Coast's goal tally first, score column indicates score after each Diomande goal.

List of international goals scored by Yan Diomande
| No. | Date | Venue | Opponent | Score | Result | Competition |
|---|---|---|---|---|---|---|
| 1. | 10 October 2025 | Côte d'Or National Sports Complex, Saint Pierre, Mauritius | Seychelles | 5–0 | 7–0 | 2026 FIFA World Cup qualification |
| 2. | 14 October 2025 | Alassane Ouattara Stadium, Abidjan, Ivory Coast | Kenya | 2–0 | 3–0 | 2026 FIFA World Cup qualification |
| 3. | 6 January 2026 | Marrakesh Stadium, Marrakesh, Morocco | Burkina Faso | 2–0 | 3–0 | 2025 Africa Cup of Nations |

== Honours ==
Individual

- Bundesliga Player of the Month: April 2026
- Bundesliga Rookie of the Month: December 2025, February 2026
- Bundesliga Rookie of the Season: 2025–26
- VDV Newcomer of the Season (Silver Arrow): 2025–26
