= Christoph Baumgartner =

Austrian footballer (born 1999)

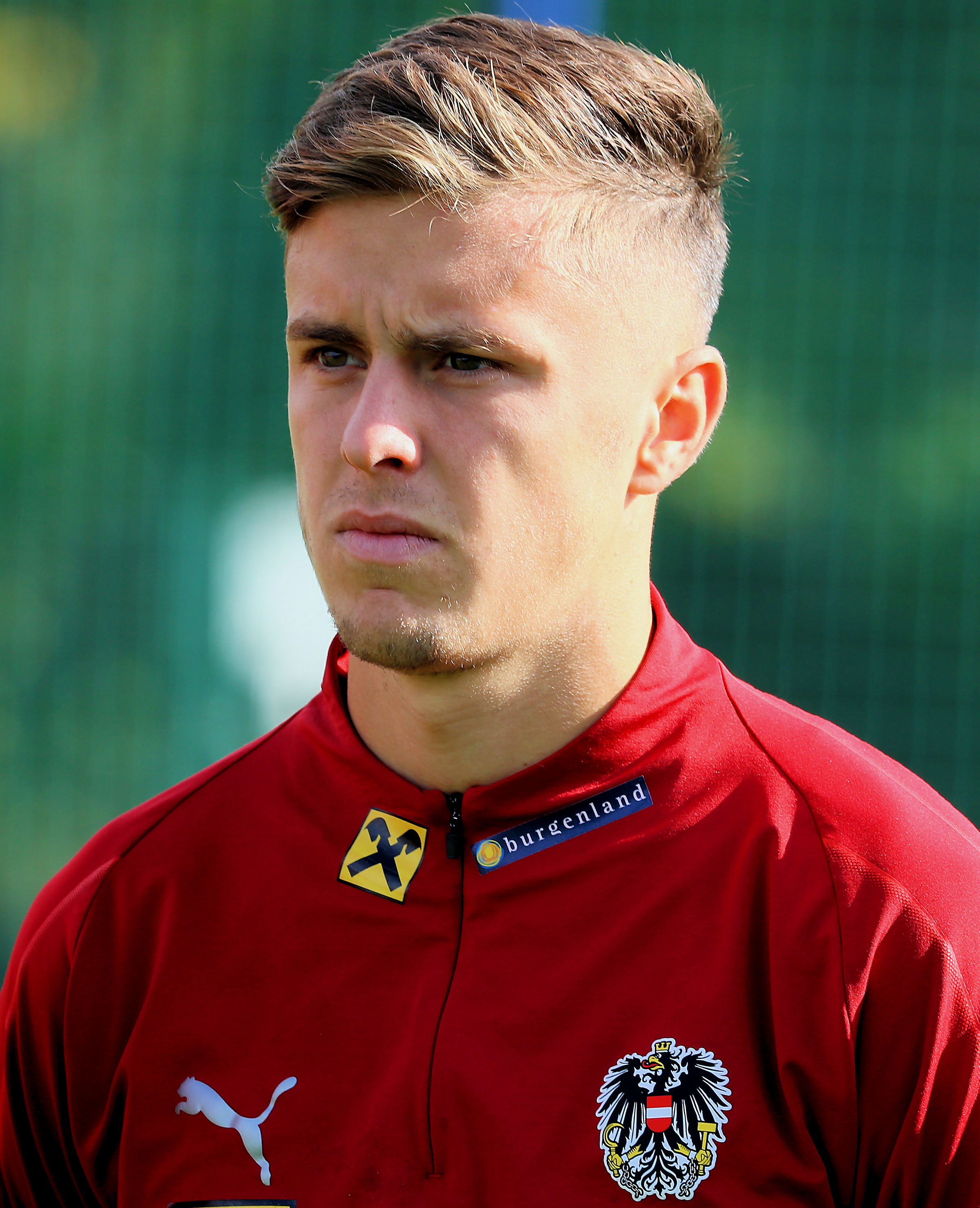
- Baumgartner with Austria in 2019

Personal information
- Full name: Christoph Baumgartner
- Date of birth: 1 August 1999 (age 27)
- Place of birth: Horn, Austria
- Height: 1.80 m (5 ft 11 in)
- Positions: Attacking midfielder; forward

Team information
- Current team: RB Leipzig
- Number: 14

Youth career
- 2005–2012: SV Horn
- 2012–2017: AKA St. Pölten
- 2017–2018: TSG Hoffenheim

Senior career*
Years	Team	Apps	(Gls)
2018–2019	TSG Hoffenheim II	14	(5)
2019–2023	TSG Hoffenheim	121	(27)
2023–	RB Leipzig	98	(21)

International career^{‡}
2014	Austria U15	2	(0)
2014–2015	Austria U16	12	(5)
2015–2016	Austria U17	10	(4)
2016–2017	Austria U18	6	(2)
2017–2018	Austria U19	9	(4)
2017–2020	Austria U21	6	(0)
2020–	Austria	60	(19)
- * Club domestic league appearances and goals as of 31 October 2026 ‡ National team caps and goals as of 17 November 2026

Christoph Baumgartner (born 1 August 1999) is an Austrian professional footballer who plays as an attacking midfielder and forward for Bundesliga club RB Leipzig and the Austria national team. He was selected Austrian Footballer of the Year in 2024.

== Club career ==
=== TSG Hoffenheim ===
In January 2019, Baumgartner was promoted to the first team squad of TSG Hoffenheim. He made his debut for Hoffenheim in the Bundesliga on 11 May 2019, coming on as a half-time substitute for Nadiem Amiri in the 0–1 home loss against Werder Bremen.

=== RB Leipzig ===
On 23 June 2023, RB Leipzig announced the signing of Baumgartner on a five-year contract. On 12 December 2025, he made his 100th appearance for the club in a 3–1 away defeat against Union Berlin. He concluded the 2025–26 season as the club's top scorer, finishing with 13 goals and 9 assists in the Bundesliga.

== International career ==
=== Youth ===
Baumgartner appeared for the various Austrian youth national teams, from the under-15 to under-19 selections. In April 2016, he was included in Austria's squad for the 2016 UEFA European Under-17 Championship in Azerbaijan. He scored both goals in Austria's 2–0 win in their opening match against Bosnia and Herzegovina, with the team managing to reach the quarter-finals before losing to Portugal.

He made his under-21 debut on 10 November 2017, coming on as a substitute for Mathias Honsak in the 87th minute of the 2019 UEFA European Under-21 Championship qualification match against Serbia, which finished as a 1–3 home loss.

=== Senior ===
In August 2020, Baumgartner was called up for the Austrian senior team for the first time. On 4 September, he started his first match in a 2–1 away win over Norway during the UEFA Nations League. Three days later, he scored his first goal in a 3–2 home defeat against Romania.

On 24 May 2021, he was named in Austrian squad for the UEFA Euro 2020. On 21 June, he scored the only goal for Austria in a 1–0 win over Ukraine, to help his national team to reach the knockout stages of the competition for the first time in their history.

On 23 March 2024, Baumgartner scored what is believed to be the fastest goal in the history of international football, scoring after only six seconds in a 2–0 friendly victory over Slovakia in Bratislava. Later that year, on 7 June, he was named in the 26-man squad for the UEFA Euro 2024. On 21 June, he scored his country's second goal in a 3–1 victory over Poland during the group stage.

In May 2026, Baumgartner was called up to the 26-man Austrian squad for the 2026 FIFA World Cup. However, on 2 June, it was confirmed that he had to withdraw from the squad due to a muscle injury in his thigh, which he sustained during a training session leading up to the tournament. He was replaced by Dejan Ljubičić.

== Personal life ==
Baumgartner's older brother, Dominik, is also a professional footballer and former youth international for Austria.

== Career statistics ==
=== Club ===
As of match played 31 October 2026

Appearances and goals by club, season and competition
Club	Season	League			DFB-Pokal		Europe		Other		Total	
Club	Season	Division	Apps	Goals	Apps	Goals	Apps	Goals	Apps	Goals	Apps	Goals
TSG Hoffenheim II	2018–19	Regionalliga Südwest	14	5	—		—		—		14	5
TSG Hoffenheim	2018–19	Bundesliga	2	0	—		—		—		2	0
TSG Hoffenheim	2019–20	Bundesliga	26	7	2	0	—		—		28	7
TSG Hoffenheim	2020–21	Bundesliga	31	6	2	0	8 (Note: Appearances in UEFA Europa League)	4	—		41	10
TSG Hoffenheim	2021–22	Bundesliga	29	7	2	0	—		—		31	7
TSG Hoffenheim	2022–23	Bundesliga	33	7	3	0	—		—		36	7
TSG Hoffenheim	Total		121	27	9	0	8	4	0	0	138	31
RB Leipzig	2023–24	Bundesliga	32	5	2	0	6 (Note: Appearances in UEFA Champions League)	0	0	0	40	5
RB Leipzig	2024–25	Bundesliga	31	2	4	1	8	2	—		43	5
RB Leipzig	2025–26	Bundesliga	33	13	4	4	—		—		37	17
RB Leipzig	2026–27	Bundesliga	2	1	1	2	1	0	—		4	3
RB Leipzig	Total		98	21	11	7	15	2	0	0	124	30
Career total			233	53	20	7	23	6	0	0	276	66

=== International ===
As of match played 17 November 2026

Appearances and goals by national team and year
National team	Year	Apps	Goals
Austria	2020	5	2
Austria	2021	12	4
Austria	2022	8	1
Austria	2023	9	4
Austria	2024	14	7
Austria	2025	8	1
Austria	2026	4	0
Total		60	19

Scores and results list Austria's goal tally first, score column indicates score after each Baumgartner goal

List of international goals scored by Christoph Baumgartner
No.	Date	Venue	Opponent	Score	Result	Competition
1	7 September 2020	Wörthersee Stadion, Klagenfurt, Austria	Romania	1–1	2–3	2020–21 UEFA Nations League B
2	7 October 2020	Wörthersee Stadion, Klagenfurt, Austria	Greece	2–1	2–1	Friendly
3	28 March 2021	Ernst-Happel-Stadion, Vienna, Austria	Faroe Islands	2–1	3–1	2022 FIFA World Cup qualification
4	21 June 2021	Arena Națională, Bucharest, Romania	Ukraine	1–0	1–0	UEFA Euro 2020
5	1 September 2021	Zimbru Stadium, Chișinău, Moldova	Moldova	1–0	2–0	2022 FIFA World Cup qualification
6.	4 September 2021	Sammy Ofer Stadium, Haifa, Israel	Israel	1–3	2–5	2022 FIFA World Cup qualification
7	25 September 2022	Ernst-Happel-Stadion, Vienna, Austria	Croatia	1–1	1–3	2022–23 UEFA Nations League A
8	24 March 2023	Raiffeisen Arena, Pasching, Austria	Azerbaijan	4–1	4–1	UEFA Euro 2024 qualification
9	20 June 2023	Ernst-Happel-Stadion, Vienna, Austria	Sweden	1–0	2–0	UEFA Euro 2024 qualification
10	20 June 2023	Ernst-Happel-Stadion, Vienna, Austria	Sweden	2–0	2–0	UEFA Euro 2024 qualification
11	21 November 2023	Ernst-Happel-Stadion, Vienna, Austria	Germany	2–0	2–0	Friendly
12	23 March 2024	Tehelné pole, Bratislava, Slovakia	Slovakia	1–0	2–0	Friendly
13	26 March 2024	Ernst-Happel-Stadion, Vienna, Austria	Turkey	5–1	6–1	Friendly
14	4 June 2024	Ernst-Happel-Stadion, Vienna, Austria	Serbia	2–0	2–1	Friendly
15	8 June 2024	Kybunpark, St. Gallen, Switzerland	Switzerland	1–0	1–1	Friendly
16.	21 June 2024	Olympiastadion, Berlin, Germany	Poland	2–1	3–1	UEFA Euro 2024
17	10 October 2024	Raiffeisen Arena, Linz, Austria	Kazakhstan	1–0	4–0	2024–25 UEFA Nations League B
18	14 November 2024	Pavlodar Central Stadium, Pavlodar, Kazakhstan	Kazakhstan	1–0	2–0	2024–25 UEFA Nations League B
19	10 June 2025	San Marino Stadium, Serravalle, San Marino	San Marino	4–0	4–0	2026 FIFA World Cup qualification

== Honours ==
Individual

- Austrian Footballer of the Year: 2024
