= Suleman Sani =

Nigerian footballer (born 2006)

Personal information
- Full name: Suleman Sani
- Date of birth: 1 September 2006 (age 20)
- Place of birth: Nigeria
- Height: 1.75 m (5 ft 9 in)
- Position: Winger

Team information
- Current team: Al-Qadsiah
- Number: 18

Youth career
- –2024: Wikki Academy

Senior career*
Years	Team	Apps	(Gls)
2024	Akwa United	15	(11)
2024–2026	AS Trenčín	34	(5)
2026–	RB Leipzig	0	(0)

International career
2025–	Nigeria U20	3	(0)
- * Club domestic league appearances and goals as of 19:40, 13 January 2026 (UTC)

Suleman Sani (born 1 September 2006) is a Nigerian professional footballer who plays as a winger for Bundesliga club RB Leipzig.

He is considered to be one of the best young Nigerian talents.

== Club career ==
Sani had previously been playing with Wikki Tourists, a team in the Nigeria National League, before transferring to Akwa United in the mid-season transfer window of 2023–24.

=== Akwa United ===
The 17-year-old forward was instrumental in Akwa United's efforts during the 2023–24 season, netting 11 goals and contributing five assists in 15 league matches. His performances not only aided Akwa United in evading relegation but also secured him the Rookie of the Season award at the 2024 League Bloggers Awards. In the 19 games he played for Akwa United, he was voted Man of the Match seven times.

Sani was able to score 11 goals and provide 5 assists in his first season with Akwa United.

=== Trenčín ===
On 22 July 2024, it was announced that Sani would be joining Slovak club AS Trenčín on a two-year contract with an option for another year. He would make his debut in the Slovak First League in a 1–1 draw against Zemplín Michalovce, coming onto the game as a substitute in the 85th minute. Sani scored his first goal for the red and whites in a 2–2 draw against Dukla Banská Bystrica, scoring in the 66th minute to level the game. He received a red card in a 1–0 home defeat against Spartak Trnava after a clash with Roko Jureškin. Sani would score the winning goal for his club in a 3–2 win over league newcomers Tatran Presov, scoring in the 78th minute to increase the score to 3–1 in his clubs favor. He also scored in the 32nd minute to level the game to 1–1. In October 2025, it was reported that Tottenham Hotspur and Bayer 04 Leverkusen had an interest in signing Suleiman. In a 1–0 home loss in the league against KFC Komárno, Sani was sent off in the 85th minute after diving in the opponents box and receiving a second yellow. The sending off was criticized by Trenčín manager Ricardo Moniz as being “very unnecessary”.

=== RB Leipzig ===
On 13 January 2026, Sani moved to Germany, joining Bundesliga club RB Leipzig on a contract until June 2031, for a reported fee of €5 million, which could rise to €6 million with add-ons. He became the most expensive transfer from Trenčín and 4th most expensive in the history of the Slovak league.

== International career ==
In September 2025, it was announced that Sani would be a part of the Nigerian U20 team competing in the 2025 FIFA U-20 World Cup. He played in all 3 matches in the group stages, assisting a goal in a 3–2 win against Saudi Arabia U20. Sani would miss the round of 16 clash against Argentina U20 due to suspension. Argentina would win the game 4–0, knocking Nigeria out of the competition.

== Style of play ==
Sani has been described as being good with both feet, quick, technically skilled and creative.
