= 2022 DFB-Pokal final =

- Match programme cover
- Event: 2021–22 DFB-Pokal
SC Freiburg	RB Leipzig
1	1
- After extra time RB Leipzig won 4–2 on penalties
- Date: 21 May 2022
- Venue: Olympiastadion, Berlin
- Man of the Match: Nico Schlotterbeck (SC Freiburg)
- Referee: Sascha Stegemann (Niederkassel)
- Attendance: 74,322

The 2022 DFB-Pokal final was an association football match played between RB Leipzig and SC Freiburg at the Olympiastadion in Berlin on 21 May 2022. Organized by the German Football Association (DFB), it was the 79th final of the competition and the first match which allowed full capacity in two years, due to the COVID-19 pandemic in Germany.

RB Leipzig won the match 4–2 on penalties, following a 1–1 draw after extra time, for their first DFB-Pokal title, as well as the first ever major trophy in club's history. As winners, they hosted the 2022 edition of the DFL-Supercup at the start of the following season, and faced the winners of the 2021–22 edition of the Bundesliga, Bayern Munich. As Leipzig already qualified for the 2022–23 edition of the UEFA Champions League through their position in the Bundesliga, the UEFA Europa League group stage spot reserved for the cup winners went to the sixth-placed team, SC Freiburg, and the league's UEFA Europa Conference League play-off round spot to the seventh-placed team, 1. FC Köln.

== Teams ==
In the following table, finals until 1943 were in the Tschammerpokal era, since 1953 were in the DFB-Pokal era.

Team	Previous final appearances (bold indicates winners)
SC Freiburg	None
RB Leipzig	2 (2019, 2021)

== Route to the final ==
The DFB-Pokal began with 64 teams in a single-elimination knockout cup competition. There were a total of five rounds leading up to the final. Teams were drawn against each other, and the winner after 90 minutes advanced. If still tied, 30 minutes of extra time were played. If the score was still level, a penalty shoot-out was used to determine the winner.

Note: In all results below, the score of the finalist is given first (H: home; A: away).

SC Freiburg		Round	RB Leipzig	
Opponent	Result	2021–22 DFB-Pokal	Opponent	Result
Würzburger Kickers	1–0 (A)	First round	SV Sandhausen	4–0 (A)
VfL Osnabrück	2–2 (a.e.t.) (3–2 p) (A)	Second round	SV Babelsberg	1–0 (A)
1899 Hoffenheim	4–1 (A)	Round of 16	Hansa Rostock	2–0 (H)
VfL Bochum	2–1 (a.e.t.) (A)	Quarter-finals	Hannover 96	4–0 (A)
Hamburger SV	3–1 (A)	Semi-finals	Union Berlin	2–1 (H)

== Match ==
=== Details ===
21 May 2022
20:00 CEST

SC Freiburg	1–1 (a.e.t.)	RB Leipzig
Eggestein 19'	Report	Nkunku 76'
Penalties
Petersen (penalty scored); Günter (penalty missed); K. Schlotterbeck (penalty scored); Demirović (penalty missed)	2–4	(penalty scored) Nkunku; (penalty scored) Orbán; (penalty scored) Olmo; (penalty scored) Henrichs

Olympiastadion, Berlin
Attendance: 74,322
Referee: Sascha Stegemann (Niederkassel)

**SC Freiburg**	**RB Leipzig**

GK	26	(Netherlands) Mark Flekken
CB	5	(Germany) Manuel Gulde		(substituted off) 106'
CB	3	(Austria) Philipp Lienhart	(yellow card) 90'
CB	4	(Germany) Nico Schlotterbeck
RM	17	(Germany) Lukas Kübler	(yellow card) 81'	(substituted off) 86'
CM	8	(Germany) Maximilian Eggestein		(substituted off) 86'
CM	27	(Germany) Nicolas Höfler
LM	30	(Germany) Christian Günter (c)
RW	22	(Hungary) Roland Sallai		(substituted off) 79'
LW	32	(Italy) Vincenzo Grifo
CF	9	(Germany) Lucas Höler		(substituted off) 79'
Substitutes:
GK	1	(Germany) Benjamin Uphoff
DF	7	(France) Jonathan Schmid		(substituted on) 86'
DF	25	(France) Kiliann Sildillia
DF	31	(Germany) Keven Schlotterbeck		(substituted on) 106'
MF	19	(Germany) Janik Haberer		(substituted on) 86'
MF	33	(Germany) Noah Weißhaupt
FW	11	(Bosnia and Herzegovina) Ermedin Demirović	(yellow card) 113'	(substituted on) 79'
FW	18	(Germany) Nils Petersen		(substituted on) 79'
FW	29	(South Korea) Jeong Woo-yeong
Manager:
(Germany) Christian Streich

GK	1	(Hungary) Péter Gulácsi (c)
CB	2	(France) Mohamed Simakan	(yellow card) 57'	(substituted off) 113'
CB	4	(Hungary) Willi Orbán
CB	23	(Germany) Marcel Halstenberg	(red card) 57'
RM	16	(Germany) Lukas Klostermann
CM	27	(Austria) Konrad Laimer		(substituted off) 99'
CM	44	(Slovenia) Kevin Kampl	(yellow card) 57' (yellow-red card) 118'	(substituted off) 69'
LM	39	(Germany) Benjamin Henrichs
RW	10	(Sweden) Emil Forsberg	(yellow card) 82'	(substituted off) 61'
LW	18	(France) Christopher Nkunku
CF	33	(Portugal) André Silva		(substituted off) 61'
Substitutes:
GK	31	(Spain) Josep Martínez
DF	3	(Spain) Angeliño
DF	22	(France) Nordi Mukiele		(substituted on) 61'
DF	32	(Croatia) Joško Gvardiol		(substituted on) 113'
MF	8	(Mali) Amadou Haidara
MF	14	(United States) Tyler Adams		(substituted on) 99'
MF	17	(Hungary) Dominik Szoboszlai		(substituted on) 61'
MF	25	(Spain) Dani Olmo		(substituted on) 69'
FW	9	(Denmark) Yussuf Poulsen
Manager:
(Italy) Domenico Tedesco			(yellow card) 90+2'

Man of the Match:
Nico Schlotterbeck (SC Freiburg)

Assistant referees:
Mike Pickel (Mendig)
Frederick Assmuth (Cologne)
Fourth official:
Robert Schröder (Hanover)
Video assistant referee:
Sören Storks (Ramsdorf)
Assistant video assistant referee:
Christian Gittelmann (Gauersheim)

**Match rules**

- 90 minutes.
- 30 minutes of extra time if necessary.
- Penalty shoot-out if scores still level.
- Nine named substitutes.
- Maximum of five substitutions. (Note: Each team was given only three opportunities to make substitutions, with a fourth opportunity in extra time, excluding substitutions made at half-time, before the start of extra time and at half-time in extra time.)

== See also ==
- 2022 DFL-Supercup
- Football in Berlin
