= 2022 DFL-Supercup =

German Supercup
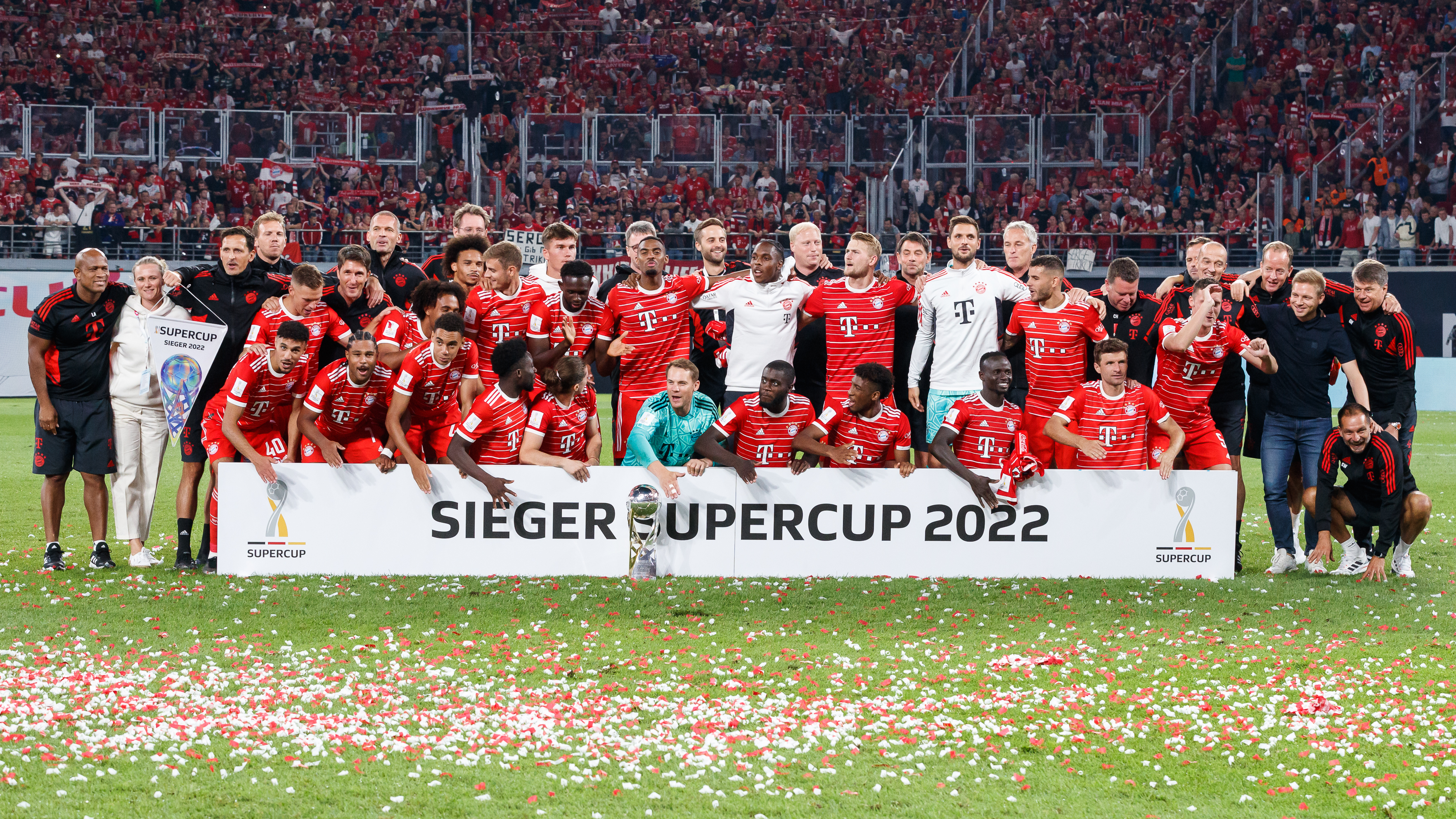
- Bayern Munich players celebrating the title
- Event: DFL-Supercup
RB Leipzig	Bayern Munich
3	5
- Date: 30 July 2022
- Venue: Red Bull Arena, Leipzig
- Referee: Robert Schröder (Hanover)
- Attendance: 47,069

The 2022 DFL-Supercup was the 13th edition of the German super cup under the name DFL-Supercup, an annual football match contested by the winners of the previous season's Bundesliga and DFB-Pokal competitions. The match was played on 30 July 2022.

The match featured RB Leipzig, the winners of the 2021–22 DFB-Pokal, and Bayern Munich, the winners of the 2021–22 Bundesliga. RB Leipzig hosted the match at the Red Bull Arena in Leipzig.

Bayern Munich were the defending champions, having won the 2021 edition 3–1 against Borussia Dortmund. They successfully defended their title, winning the match 5–3 for their third consecutive and tenth overall title.

== Teams ==
In the following table, matches until 1996 were in the DFB-Supercup era, since 2010 were in the DFL-Supercup era.

Team	Qualification	Previous appearances (bold indicates winners)
RB Leipzig	2021–22 DFB-Pokal winners	None
Bayern Munich^{TH}	2021–22 Bundesliga champions	15 (**1987**, 1989, **1990**, 1994, **2010**, **2012**, 2013, 2014, 2015, **2016**, **2017**, **2018**, 2019, **2020**, **2021**) (Note: Runners-up in the unofficial 2008 German Supercup. Six-time winners and one-time runners-up in the DFL-Ligapokal.)

== Match ==
=== Details ===
30 July 2022
20:30 CEST

RB Leipzig	3–5	Bayern Munich
Halstenberg 59'; Nkunku 77' (pen.); Olmo 89'	Report	Musiala 14'; Mané 31'; Pavard 45'; Gnabry 66'; Sané 90+8'

Red Bull Arena, Leipzig
Attendance: 47,069
Referee: Robert Schröder (Hanover)

**RB Leipzig**	**Bayern Munich**

GK	1	(Hungary) Péter Gulácsi (c)
CB	2	(France) Mohamed Simakan	(yellow card) 36'	(substituted off) 79'
CB	4	(Hungary) Willi Orbán
CB	23	(Germany) Marcel Halstenberg
RM	16	(Germany) Lukas Klostermann	(yellow card) 90+2'
CM	27	(Austria) Konrad Laimer
CM	44	(Slovenia) Kevin Kampl		(substituted off) 52'
LM	39	(Germany) Benjamin Henrichs
RW	17	(Hungary) Dominik Szoboszlai		(substituted off) 90+1'
CF	10	(Sweden) Emil Forsberg		(substituted off) 52'
LW	18	(France) Christopher Nkunku
Substitutes:
GK	21	(Germany) Janis Blaswich
DF	25	(Germany) Sanoussy Ba
MF	7	(Spain) Dani Olmo		(substituted on) 52'
MF	8	(Mali) Amadou Haidara		(substituted on) 90+1'
MF	24	(Austria) Xaver Schlager
MF	38	(Spain) Hugo Novoa		(substituted on) 79'
FW	19	(Portugal) André Silva		(substituted on) 52'
Manager:
(Italy) Domenico Tedesco

GK	1	(Germany) Manuel Neuer (c)	(yellow card) 90+7'
RB	5	(France) Benjamin Pavard		(substituted off) 78'
CB	2	(France) Dayot Upamecano		(substituted off) 78'
CB	21	(France) Lucas Hernandez	(yellow card) 73'
LB	19	(Canada) Alphonso Davies
CM	18	(Austria) Marcel Sabitzer
CM	6	(Germany) Joshua Kimmich	(yellow card) 64'
RW	25	(Germany) Thomas Müller		(substituted off) 68'
LW	42	(Germany) Jamal Musiala		(substituted off) 60'
CF	7	(Germany) Serge Gnabry		(substituted off) 78'
CF	17	(Senegal) Sadio Mané
Substitutes:
GK	26	(Germany) Sven Ulreich
DF	4	(Netherlands) Matthijs de Ligt		(substituted on) 78'
DF	23	(France) Tanguy Nianzou
DF	40	(Morocco) Noussair Mazraoui		(substituted on) 78'
DF	44	(Croatia) Josip Stanišić
MF	38	(Netherlands) Ryan Gravenberch		(substituted on) 68'
FW	10	(Germany) Leroy Sané	(yellow card) 87'	(substituted on) 78'
FW	11	(France) Kingsley Coman		(substituted on) 60'
FW	32	(Netherlands) Joshua Zirkzee
Manager:
(Germany) Julian Nagelsmann

Assistant referees:
Jan Neitzel-Petersen (Hamburg)
René Rohde (Rostock)
Fourth official:
Patrick Ittrich (Hamburg)
Video assistant referee:
Benjamin Brand (Unterspiesheim)
Assistant video assistant referee:
Thomas Stein (Aschaffenburg)

**Match rules**

- 90 minutes.
- Penalty shoot-out if scores level.
- Nine named substitutes, of which up to five may be used. (Note: Each team was given only three opportunities to make substitutions, excluding substitutions made at half-time.)

== See also ==
- 2022–23 Bundesliga
- 2022–23 DFB-Pokal
