= 2022–23 RB Leipzig season =

RB Leipzig
2022–23 season
- Owner: Red Bull GmbH
- CEO: Oliver Mintzlaff
- Head coach: Domenico Tedesco (until 7 September); Marco Rose (from 8 September)
- Stadium: Red Bull Arena
- Bundesliga: 3rd
- DFB-Pokal: Winners
- DFL-Supercup: Runners-up
- UEFA Champions League: Round of 16
- Top goalscorer: League: Christopher Nkunku (16); All: Christopher Nkunku (23)
- Biggest win: Teutonia Ottensen 0–8 RB Leipzig
- Biggest defeat: Manchester City 7–0 RB Leipzig
Home colours	Away colours	Third colours

The 2022–23 season was the 14th season in the history of RB Leipzig and their seventh consecutive season in the top flight. The club participated in the Bundesliga, DFB-Pokal, DFL-Supercup and UEFA Champions League.

== Players ==
=== First-team squad ===
As of 4 January 2023

Note: Flags indicate national team as defined under FIFA eligibility rules; some limited exceptions apply. Players may hold more than one non-FIFA nationality.

No.	Pos.	Nation	Player
1	GK	HUN	Péter Gulácsi (captain)
2	DF	FRA	Mohamed Simakan
4	DF	HUN	Willi Orbán (vice-captain)
7	MF	ESP	Dani Olmo
8	MF	MLI	Amadou Haidara
9	FW	DEN	Yussuf Poulsen (3rd captain)
10	MF	SWE	Emil Forsberg
11	FW	GER	Timo Werner
13	GK	NOR	Ørjan Nyland
16	DF	GER	Lukas Klostermann
17	MF	HUN	Dominik Szoboszlai
18	FW	FRA	Christopher Nkunku
19	FW	POR	André Silva

No.	Pos.	Nation	Player
21	GK	GER	Janis Blaswich
22	DF	GER	David Raum
23	DF	GER	Marcel Halstenberg
24	MF	AUT	Xaver Schlager
25	DF	GER	Sanoussy Ba
27	MF	AUT	Konrad Laimer
28	DF	USA	Caden Clark
32	DF	CRO	Joško Gvardiol
34	GK	GER	Jonas Nickisch
36	GK	GER	Timo Schlieck
37	DF	SEN	Abdou Diallo (on loan from Paris Saint-Germain)
39	DF	GER	Benjamin Henrichs
44	MF	SLO	Kevin Kampl (4th captain)

=== Players out on loan ===
Note: Flags indicate national team as defined under FIFA eligibility rules; some limited exceptions apply. Players may hold more than one non-FIFA nationality.

No.	Pos.	Nation	Player
—	DF	ESP	Angeliño (at 1899 Hoffenheim until 30 June 2023)
—	FW	GER	Dennis Borkowski (at Dynamo Dresden until 30 June 2023)
—	FW	GER	Fabrice Hartmann (at Sligo Rovers until 30 June 2023)
—	FW	GER	Mehmet Ibrahimi (at Eintracht Braunschweig until 30 June 2023)
—	DF	GER	Frederik Jäkel (at Arminia Bielefeld until 30 June 2023)
—	MF	GER	Tom Krauß (at Schalke 04 until 30 June 2023)
—	GK	ESP	Josep Martínez (at Genoa until 30 June 2023)
—	MF	GUI	Ilaix Moriba (at Valencia until 30 June 2023)
–	FW	ESP	Hugo Novoa (at FC Basel until 30 June 2024)
—	GK	GER	Tim Schreiber (at Holstein Kiel until 30 June 2024)
—	FW	NOR	Alexander Sørloth (at Real Sociedad until 30 June 2023)

== Transfers ==
=== In ===
No.	Pos.	Player	Transferred from	Fee	Date	Source
21	GK	(Germany) Janis Blaswich	(Netherlands) Heracles Almelo	Free transfer	1 July 2022	
24	MF	(Austria) Xaver Schlager	(Germany) VfL Wolfsburg	€12,000,000	1 July 2022	
22	DF	(Germany) David Raum	(Germany) 1899 Hoffenheim	€26,000,000	31 July 2022	
11	FW	(Germany) Timo Werner	(England) Chelsea	€20,000,000	9 August 2022	
37	DF	(Senegal) Abdou Diallo	(France) Paris Saint-Germain	Loan	1 September 2022	
13	GK	(Norway) Ørjan Nyland	(England) Reading	Free transfer	9 October 2022	

=== Out ===
No.	Pos.	Player	Transferred to	Fee	Date	Source
11	FW	(South Korea) Hwang Hee-chan	(England) Wolverhampton Wanderers	€16,700,000	1 July 2022	
13	GK	(Germany) Philipp Tschauner	Retired	End of contract	1 July 2022	
32	GK	(Germany) Tim Schreiber	(Germany) Holstein Kiel	Loan	1 July 2022	
33	GK	(Spain) Josep Martínez	(Italy) Genoa	Loan	1 July 2022	
37	DF	(Germany) Frederik Jäkel	(Germany) Arminia Bielefeld	Loan	1 July 2022	
37	MF	(Germany) Sidney Raebiger	(Germany) Greuther Fürth	Undisclosed	1 July 2022	
41	FW	(Germany) Dennis Borkowski	(Germany) Dynamo Dresden	Loan	1 July 2022	
45	MF	(Germany) Mehmet Ibrahimi	(Germany) Eintracht Braunschweig	Loan	1 July 2022	
45	DF	(Germany) Eric Martel	(Germany) 1. FC Köln	€1,200,000	1 July 2022	
53	MF	(Germany) Tom Krauß	(Germany) Schalke 04	Loan	1 July 2022	
14	MF	(United States) Tyler Adams	(England) Leeds United	€17,000,000	6 July 2022	
46	MF	(Germany) Ben Klefisch	(Germany) Viktoria Köln	Loan	8 July 2022	
28	GK	(Switzerland) Yvon Mvogo	(France) Lorient	Undisclosed	13 July 2022	
	FW	(Netherlands) Noah Ohio	(Belgium) Standard Liège	Undisclosed	14 July 2022	
	FW	(Netherlands) Brian Brobbey	(Netherlands) Ajax	€16,350,000	22 July 2022	
22	DF	(France) Nordi Mukiele	(France) Paris Saint-Germain	€12,000,000	26 July 2022	
35	FW	(Germany) Fabrice Hartmann	(Republic of Ireland) Sligo Rovers	Loan	27 July 2022	
37	FW	(Nigeria) Ademola Lookman	(Italy) Atalanta	€9,000,000	4 August 2022	
3	DF	(Spain) Angeliño	(Germany) 1899 Hoffenheim	Loan	8 August 2022	
35	FW	(Norway) Alexander Sørloth	(Spain) Real Sociedad	Loan	29 August 2022	
47	MF	(Germany) Joscha Wosz	(Germany) SC Verl	Free	29 August 2022	
	DF	(Netherlands) Solomon Bonnah	Austria Klagenfurt	Undisclosed	31 August 2022	
26	MF	(Guinea) Ilaix Moriba	(Spain) Valencia	Loan	1 September 2022	
38	FW	(Spain) Hugo Novoa	(Switzerland) Basel	Loan	4 January 2023	
46	MF	(Germany) Ben Klefisch	(Germany) SC Paderborn II	Free	1 February 2023	

== Pre-season and friendlies ==
Win Draw Loss Fixtures

16 July 2022 Friendly	RB Leipzig	3–1	Southampton	Wolfsberg, Austria
14:00 CEST (UTC+2)	Angeliño 54'; Forsberg 67'; Moriba 90'	Report	Bednarek (yellow card) 2'; A. Armstrong 64'	Stadium: Lavanttal-Arena; Attendance: 917
Note: Match was played with two 45-minute halves and one additional 15-minute period.

21 July 2022 Friendly	RB Leipzig	0–5	Liverpool	Leipzig
19:15 CEST (UTC+2)		Report	Salah 8'; Núñez 48' (pen.), 51', 68', 89'	Stadium: Red Bull Arena; Attendance: 47,069; Referee: Felix Zwayer (Germany)

25 November 2022 Friendly	RB Leipzig	6–0	Radomiak Radom	Leipzig
14:00 CET (UTC+1)	Laimer 32'; Szoboszlai 43', 72'; Kohl 65'; Schierack 86'; Sokół 90' (o.g.)	Report		Stadium: Trainingszentrum RB Leipzig; Attendance: 423

2 December 2022 Friendly	RB Leipzig	2–1	Horsens	Leipzig
14:00 CET (UTC+1)	Haidara 36'; Henrichs 74'	Report	Jacobsen 6'; Gemmer (yellow card) 26'	Stadium: Trainingszentrum RB Leipzig; Attendance: 455; Referee: Steven Greif (Germany)

7 January 2023 Friendly	Eintracht Frankfurt	4–2	RB Leipzig	Dubai, United Arab Emirates
17:00 GST (UTC+5)	Lindstrøm 7'; Borré 70'; Kolo Muani 72', 84'	Report	Silva 35', 45'	Stadium: NAS Sports Complex; Attendance: 0

10 January 2023 Friendly	Atletico Arabia	0–15	RB Leipzig	Dubai, United Arab Emirates
17:00 GST (UTC+5)		Report	Szoboszlai 2'; Ba 6'; Haidara 43'; Köhl 50'; Silva 67', 109'; Laimer 74', 97'; Bayindir 77', 100'; Eduardo 95', 112'; Forsberg 114', 115', 118'	Stadium: NAS Sports Complex; Attendance: 0
Note: Match was played in four periods of thirty minutes each.

14 January 2023 Friendly	RB Leipzig	4–0	Mladá Boleslav	Leipzig
14:00 CET (UTC+1)	Halstenberg 8'; Forsberg 12'; Silva 54'; Werner 73'	Report		Stadium: Trainingszentrum RB Leipzig; Attendance: 1,300; Referee: Max Burda (Germany)

== Competitions ==
=== Overall record ===
Competition	First match	Last match	Starting round	Final position	Record							
Competition	First match	Last match	Starting round	Final position	Pld	W	D	L	GF	GA	GD	Win %
Bundesliga	7 August 2022	27 May 2023	Matchday 1	3rd	34	20	6	8	64	41	+23	58.82
DFB-Pokal	30 August 2022	3 June 2023	First round	Winners	6	6	0	0	24	2	+22	100.00
DFL-Supercup	30 July 2022		Final	Runners-up	1	0	0	1	3	5	−2	0.00
UEFA Champions League	6 September 2022	14 March 2023	Group stage	Round of 16	8	4	1	3	14	17	−3	50.00
Total					49	30	7	12	105	65	+40	61.22

Source: Soccerway

=== Bundesliga ===
==== League table ====
Pos	Team	Pld	W	D	L	GF	GA	GD	Pts	Qualification or relegation
1	Bayern Munich (C)	34	21	8	5	92	38	+54	71	Qualification for the Champions League group stage
2	Borussia Dortmund	34	22	5	7	83	44	+39	71	Qualification for the Champions League group stage
3	RB Leipzig	34	20	6	8	64	41	+23	66	Qualification for the Champions League group stage
4	Union Berlin	34	18	8	8	51	38	+13	62	Qualification for the Champions League group stage
5	SC Freiburg	34	17	8	9	51	44	+7	59	Qualification for the Europa League group stage (Note: Since the 2022–23 DFB-Pokal winners, RB Leipzig, qualified for the Champions League based on league position, the Europa League group stage spot was passed to the sixth-placed team, and the Europa Conference League play-off round spot was passed to the seventh-placed team.)

Source: DFB
Rules for classification: 1) Points; 2) Goal difference; 3) Goals scored; 4) Head-to-head results; 5) Head-to-head away goals scored; 6) Away goals scored; 7) Play-off.
(C) Champions

==== Results summary ====
Overall								Home						Away					
Pld	W	D	L	GF	GA	GD	Pts	W	D	L	GF	GA	GD	W	D	L	GF	GA	GD
34	20	6	8	64	41	+23	66	13	2	2	38	18	+20	7	4	6	26	23	+3

Source: DFB

==== Results by round ====
Round	1	2	3	4	5	6	7	8	9	10	11	12	13	14	15	16	17	18	19	20	21	22	23	24	25	26	27	28	29	30	31	32	33	34
Ground	A	H	A	H	A	H	A	H	A	H	A	H	A	H	A	H	A	H	A	H	A	H	A	H	A	H	A	H	A	H	A	H	A	H
Result	D	D	L	W	L	W	L	W	D	W	D	W	W	W	W	D	W	W	D	L	W	W	L	W	L	L	W	W	L	W	W	W	W	W
Position	10	11	11	9	11	10	12	11	11	10	8	6	6	5	3	5	3	3	4	5	5	4	4	3	5	5	4	4	5	5	3	3	3	3

Source: DFB
A = Away; H = Home; W = Win; D = Draw; L = Loss

==== Matches ====
The league fixtures were announced on 17 June 2022.

7 August 2022 1	VfB Stuttgart	1–1	RB Leipzig	Stuttgart
15:30 CEST (UTC+2)	Ahamada 31'; Silas (yellow card) 64'; Mola (yellow card) 90'	Report	Nkunku 8'; Sørloth (yellow card) 86'	Stadium: Mercedes-Benz Arena; Attendance: 46,000; Referee: Tobias Stieler

13 August 2022 2	RB Leipzig	2–2	1. FC Köln	Leipzig
15:30 CEST (UTC+2)	Werner 36'; Szoboszlai (red card) 45+1'; Nkunku 56'; Henrichs (yellow card) 89'	Report	Thielmann (yellow card) 18'; Dietz 40'; Hübers (yellow card) 48'; Gvardiol 72' (o.g.); Adamyan (yellow card) 76'; Kainz (yellow card) 79'	Stadium: Red Bull Arena; Attendance: 49,579; Referee: Benjamin Brand

20 August 2022 3	Union Berlin	2–1	RB Leipzig	Berlin
18:30 CEST (UTC+2)	Pefok 32'; Becker 38'; Rønnow (yellow card) 49'; Behrens (yellow card) 65'	Report	Kampl (yellow card) 30'; Orbán 83'	Stadium: Stadion An der Alten Försterei; Attendance: 21,056; Referee: Deniz Aytekin

27 August 2022 4	RB Leipzig	2–0	VfL Wolfsburg	Leipzig
15:30 CEST (UTC+2)	Nkunku 5' (pen.), 90'; Henrichs (yellow card) 8'; Laimer (yellow card) 47'; Werner (yellow card) 88'	Report	Arnold (yellow card) 26'; Otávio (yellow card) 51'; Baku (yellow card) 53'	Stadium: Red Bull Arena; Attendance: 41,243; Referee: Bastian Dankert

3 September 2022 5	Eintracht Frankfurt	4–0	RB Leipzig	Frankfurt
18:30 CEST (UTC+2)	Kamada 16'; Rode 22'; Sow (yellow card) 33'; Tuta 67'; Borré 84' (pen.)	Report	Henrichs (yellow card) 60'	Stadium: Deutsche Bank Park; Attendance: 49,700; Referee: Felix Brych

10 September 2022 6	RB Leipzig	3–0	Borussia Dortmund	Leipzig
15:30 CEST (UTC+2)	Orbán 6'; Szoboszlai 45'; Laimer (yellow card) 75'; Haidara 84'; Raum (yellow card) 89'	Report	Meunier (yellow card) 58'	Stadium: Red Bull Arena; Attendance: 47,069; Referee: Sven Jablonski

17 September 2022 7	Borussia Mönchengladbach	3–0	RB Leipzig	Mönchengladbach
18:30 CEST (UTC+2)	Hofmann 10', 35'; Weigl (yellow card) 52'; Bensebaini 53'; Stindl (yellow card) 66'	Report	Kampl (yellow card) 25'; Henrichs (yellow card) 66'	Stadium: Borussia-Park; Attendance: 50,186; Referee: Patrick Ittrich

1 October 2022 8	RB Leipzig	4–0	VfL Bochum	Leipzig
15:30 CEST (UTC+2)	Werner 15', 53'; Nkunku 23' (pen.), 85', (penalty missed) 64'	Report	Soares (yellow card) 23'; Horn (yellow card) 22'	Stadium: Red Bull Arena; Attendance: 44,403; Referee: Florian Badstübner

8 October 2022 9	Mainz 05	1–1	RB Leipzig	Mainz
15:30 CEST (UTC+2)	Ingvartsen 45'; Hack (yellow card) 77'	Report	Forsberg (yellow card) 62'; Nkunku 80'	Stadium: Opel Arena; Attendance: 26,100; Referee: Felix Brych

15 October 2022 10	RB Leipzig	3–2	Hertha BSC	Leipzig
18:30 CEST (UTC+2)	Forsberg 25'; Diallo 30'; Haidara (yellow card) 38'; Orbán 45'; Kampl (yellow card) 63'	Report	Kempf (yellow card) 32'; Plattenhardt (yellow card) 41'; Lukebakio 62' (pen.); Jovetić 64'; Rogel (yellow card) 90+3'	Stadium: Red Bull Arena; Attendance: 47,069; Referee: Harm Osmers

22 October 2022 11	FC Augsburg	3–3	RB Leipzig	Augsburg
15:30 CEST (UTC+2)	Berisha (yellow card) 22', (goal) 34' (pen.); Demirović (yellow card) 37', (goal) 51'; Gruezo (yellow card) 60'; Vargas 64'; Iago (yellow card) 66' (yellow-red card) 66'; Gouweleeuw (yellow card) 83'; Rexhbecaj (yellow card) 90+3'	Report	Silva (yellow card) 21', (goal) 73'; Nkunku 89'; Novoa 90'	Stadium: WWK Arena; Attendance: 25,109; Referee: Robert Schröder

29 October 2022 12	RB Leipzig	2–0	Bayer Leverkusen	Leipzig
15:30 CEST (UTC+2)	Nkunku 32'; Kampl (yellow card) 35'; Diallo (yellow card) 76'; Werner 83'; Henrichs (yellow card) 86'	Report	Tapsoba (yellow card) 26'; Hincapié (yellow card) 31'	Stadium: Red Bull Arena; Attendance: 45,598; Referee: Sven Jablonski

5 November 2022 13	1899 Hoffenheim	1–3	RB Leipzig	Sinsheim
15:30 CET (UTC+1)	Geiger (yellow card) 13'; Akpoguma (yellow card) 26'; Rutter (yellow card) 27', (goal) 50'; Nsoki (yellow card) 29'	Report	Nkunku 17', 57'; Diallo (yellow card) 37'; Olmo 69'; Raum (yellow card) 83'	Stadium: Rhein-Neckar-Arena; Attendance: 23,127; Referee: Martin Petersen

9 November 2022 14	RB Leipzig	3–1	SC Freiburg	Leipzig
20:30 CET (UTC+1)	Simakan 54'; Nkunku 56', (yellow card) 90'; Forsberg 78' (pen.)	Report	Dōan (yellow card) 41'; Jeong (yellow card) 43'; Sildillia (yellow card) 46'; Kübler 66'; Sallai (yellow card) 88'	Stadium: Red Bull Arena; Attendance: 41,240; Referee: Harm Osmers

12 November 2022 15	Werder Bremen	1–2	RB Leipzig	Bremen
15:30 CET (UTC+1)	Groß 56'; Stark (yellow card) 81'	Report	Silva (yellow card) 21', (goal) 13'; Haidara (yellow card) 21'; Forsberg (yellow card) 55'; Schlager 71'	Stadium: Weser-Stadion; Attendance: 41,500; Referee: Matthias Jöllenbeck

20 January 2023 16	RB Leipzig	1–1	Bayern Munich	Leipzig
20:30 CET (UTC+1)	Schlager (yellow card) 41'; Halstenberg 52'; Laimer (yellow card) 71'	Report	Musiala (yellow card) 35'; Choupo-Moting 37'; Goretzka (yellow card) 52'; Upamecano (yellow card) 66'	Stadium: Red Bull Arena; Attendance: 47,069; Referee: Daniel Siebert

24 January 2023 17	Schalke 04	1–6	RB Leipzig	Gelsenkirchen
18:30 CET (UTC+1)	Kozuki 56'; Frey (yellow card) 79'	Report	Silva 7', 44'; Henrichs 15'; Werner 45+2'; Olmo 83'; Poulsen 89'; Kampl (yellow card) 90+3'	Stadium: Veltins-Arena; Attendance: 56,841; Referee: Benjamin Cortus

27 January 2023 18	RB Leipzig	2–1	VfB Stuttgart	Leipzig
20:30 CET (UTC+1)	Szoboszlai 25', 49'	Report	Führich 68' (pen.)	Stadium: Red Bull Arena; Attendance: 46,158; Referee: Felix Zwayer

4 February 2023 19	1. FC Köln	0–0	RB Leipzig	Cologne
15:30 CET (UTC+1)	Schmitz (yellow card) 41'; Martel (yellow card) 41'; Adamyan (yellow card) 89'	Report	Szoboszlai (yellow card) 31'; Laimer (yellow card) 37'; Gvardiol (yellow card) 45'; Henrichs (yellow card) 73'	Stadium: RheinEnergieStadion; Attendance: 48,000; Referee: Martin Petersen

11 February 2023 20	RB Leipzig	1–2	Union Berlin	Leipzig
18:30 CET (UTC+1)	Henrichs 24'; Halstenberg (yellow card) 60'; Schlager (yellow card) 69'; Werner (yellow card) 81'; Poulsen (yellow card) 88'	Report	Knoche (yellow card) 57', (goal) 72' (pen.); Haberer 61'; Laïdouni (yellow card) 65'; Pefok (yellow card) 90+1'; Leite (yellow card) 90+5'	Stadium: Red Bull Arena; Attendance: 47,069; Referee: Daniel Schlager

18 February 2023 21	VfL Wolfsburg	0–3	RB Leipzig	Wolfsburg
15:30 CET (UTC+1)	Bornauw (yellow card) 90'	Report	Forsberg 14'; Raum (yellow card) 65'; Laimer 85'; Szoboszlai 90+2'	Stadium: Volkswagen Arena; Attendance: 24,831; Referee: Deniz Aytekin

25 February 2023 22	RB Leipzig	2–1	Eintracht Frankfurt	Leipzig
15:30 CET (UTC+1)	Werner 6'; Orbán (yellow card) 33'; Forsberg 40'; Laimer (yellow card) 84'	Report	Rode (yellow card) 57'; Sow 61', (yellow card) 76'; Hasebe (yellow card) 84'	Stadium: Red Bull Arena; Attendance: 47,069; Referee: Felix Brych

3 March 2023 23	Borussia Dortmund	2–1	RB Leipzig	Dortmund
20:30 CET (UTC+1)	Reus 21' (pen.); Özcan (yellow card) 29'; Can 39'; Brandt (yellow card) 52'	Report	Nkunku (yellow card) 15'; Haidara (yellow card) 17'; Halstenberg (yellow card) 38'; Silva (yellow card) 45+3'; Henrichs (yellow card) 52'; Forsberg 74'	Stadium: Signal Iduna Park; Attendance: 81,365; Referee: Sven Jablonski

11 March 2023 24	RB Leipzig	3–0	Borussia Mönchengladbach	Leipzig
15:30 CET (UTC+1)	Raum (yellow card) 52'; Werner 57'; Forsberg 71' (pen.); Gvardiol 80'	Report	Pléa (penalty missed) 53'	Stadium: Red Bull Arena; Attendance: 46,687; Referee: Matthias Jöllenbeck

18 March 2023 25	VfL Bochum	1–0	RB Leipzig	Bochum
15:30 CET (UTC+1)	Mašović (yellow card) 14', (goal) 48'; Soares (yellow card) 44'	Report	Laimer (yellow card) 11'; Olmo (yellow card) 75'; Kampl (yellow card) 86'	Stadium: Vonovia Ruhrstadion; Attendance: 24,400; Referee: Sascha Stegemann

1 April 2023 26	RB Leipzig	0–3	Mainz 05	Leipzig
15:30 CEST (UTC+2)	Kampl (yellow card) 37'; Olmo (yellow card) 65'; Orbán (yellow card) 65'	Report	Ingvartsen 9', (yellow card) 64'; Ajorque 57'; Caci (yellow card) 61'; Hanche-Olsen (yellow card) 65'; Kohr 67'	Stadium: Red Bull Arena; Attendance: 45,597; Referee: Christian Dingert

8 April 2023 27	Hertha BSC	0–1	RB Leipzig	Berlin
18:30 CEST (UTC+2)	Lukebakio (yellow card) 31'; Uremović (yellow card) 45'; Boateng (yellow card) 45'; Kanga (yellow card) 70'	Report	Szoboszlai (yellow card) 20'; Haidara 39', (yellow card) 45'; Simakan (yellow card) 90'	Stadium: Olympiastadion; Attendance: 50,679; Referee: Deniz Aytekin

15 April 2023 28	RB Leipzig	3–2	FC Augsburg	Leipzig
15:30 CEST (UTC+2)	Kampl 10'; Werner 32', 35'; Raum (yellow card) 74'; Silva (yellow card) 90'	Report	Maier 5'; Uduokhai (yellow card) 48'; Iago (yellow card) 48'; Gouweleeuw (yellow card) 63'; Vargas 82'	Stadium: Red Bull Arena; Attendance: 46,058; Referee: Marco Fritz

22 April 2023 29	Bayer Leverkusen	2–0	RB Leipzig	Leverkusen
17:30 CEST (UTC+2)	Hložek 40'; Hincapié (yellow card) 70'; Amiri 86' (pen.), (yellow card) 87'; Andrich (yellow card) 89'	Report	Szoboszlai (yellow card) 67' (yellow-red card) 85'; Simakan (yellow card) 70'; Haidara (yellow card) 71'; Laimer (yellow card) 75'	Stadium: BayArena; Attendance: 29,085; Referee: Daniel Schlager

29 April 2023 30	RB Leipzig	1–0	1899 Hoffenheim	Leipzig
15:30 CEST (UTC+2)	Nkunku 28'	Report	Rudy (yellow card) 62'; Akpoguma (yellow card) 86'	Stadium: Red Bull Arena; Attendance: 40,000; Referee: Tobias Stieler

6 May 2023 31	SC Freiburg	0–1	RB Leipzig	Freiburg
15:30 CEST (UTC+2)	Grifo (yellow card) 83'	Report	Haidara (yellow card) 21'; Nkunku (yellow card) 36'; Laimer (yellow card) 64'; Kampl 73', (yellow card) 90'	Stadium: Europa-Park Stadion; Attendance: 32,900; Referee: Tobias Welz

14 May 2023 32	RB Leipzig	2–1	Werder Bremen	Leipzig
17:30 CEST (UTC+2)	Henrichs (yellow card) 56'; Szoboszlai (yellow card) 73', (goal) 90+6'; Orbán 87'	Report	Stark (yellow card) 22'; Jung (yellow card) 57'; Friedl (yellow card) 58'; Bittencourt 70', (yellow card) 73'	Stadium: Red Bull Arena; Attendance: 47,069; Referee: Florian Badstübner

20 May 2023 33	Bayern Munich	1–3	RB Leipzig	Munich
18:30 CEST (UTC+2)	Gnabry 25'; Pavard (yellow card) 72'	Report	Laimer 64'; Gvardiol (yellow card) 68'; Nkunku 76' (pen.); Szoboszlai 86' (pen.)	Stadium: Allianz Arena; Attendance: 75,000; Referee: Deniz Aytekin

27 May 2023 34	RB Leipzig	4–2	Schalke 04	Leipzig
15:30 CEST (UTC+2)	Laimer 10'; Nkunku 19', 90+4', (yellow card) 90+5'; Haidara (yellow card) 41'; Poulsen 82'	Report	Brunner (yellow card) 20'; Kamiński 28'; Orbán 49' (o.g.); Polter (yellow card) 63'	Stadium: Red Bull Arena; Attendance: 47,069; Referee: Harm Osmers

=== DFB-Pokal ===
30 August 2022 First round	Teutonia Ottensen	0–8	RB Leipzig	Leipzig (Note: The Teutonia Ottensen v RB Leipzig match was originally scheduled to take place at the Paul Greifzu Stadium in Dessau-Roßlau instead of Teutonia Ottensen's home stadium, the Stadion Hoheluft in Hamburg. However, the turf at the Paul Greifzu Stadium was poisoned a week before the match, leading to the teams exchanging the home rights to the match.)
20:46 CEST (UTC+2)	Łukowicz (yellow card) 49'	Report	Werner 19', 20', 43'; Silva 40', 53'; Forsberg 56'; Nkunku 77'; Olmo 80'	Stadium: Red Bull Arena; Attendance: 13,084; Referee: Harm Osmers

18 October 2022 Second round	RB Leipzig	4–0	Hamburger SV	Leipzig
18:00 CEST (UTC+2)	Poulsen 33', 36'; Henrichs (yellow card) 39', (goal) 81'; Simakan (yellow card) 45', (goal) 69'; Raum (yellow card) 71'	Report	Muheim (yellow card) 15'; Meffert (yellow card) 41'; Bilbija (yellow card) 85'	Stadium: Red Bull Arena; Attendance: 44,787; Referee: Benjamin Cortus

1 February 2023 Round of 16	RB Leipzig	3–1	1899 Hoffenheim	Leipzig
18:00 CET (UTC+1)	Forsberg 8'; Laimer 41'; Werner 83'	Report	Angeliño (yellow card) 34'; Tohumcu (yellow card) 40'; Nsoki (yellow card) 58' (yellow-red card) 86'; Dolberg 76'	Stadium: Red Bull Arena; Attendance: 34,822; Referee: Christian Dingert

5 April 2023 Quarter-finals	RB Leipzig	2–0	Borussia Dortmund	Leipzig
20:45 CEST (UTC+2)	Werner 22'; Raum (yellow card) 58'; Szoboszlai (yellow card) 90+5'; Orbán 90+8'	Report	Ryerson (yellow card) 40'; Bellingham (yellow card) 85'; Malen (yellow card) 90+2'; Hummels (yellow card) 90+6'	Stadium: Red Bull Arena; Attendance: 47,069; Referee: Felix Brych

2 May 2023 Semi-finals	SC Freiburg	1–5	RB Leipzig	Freiburg
20:45 CEST (UTC+2)	Kübler (yellow card) 68'; Gregoritsch 75'; Sallai (yellow card) 90+4'	Report	Olmo 13'; Henrichs 14'; Szoboszlai 37', 90+7' (pen.); Nkunku 45+1', (yellow card) 60'; Gvardiol (red card) 58'; Blaswich (yellow card) 70'; Laimer (yellow card) 85'	Stadium: Europa-Park Stadion; Attendance: 34,700; Referee: Sven Jablonski

3 June 2023 Final	RB Leipzig	2–0	Eintracht Frankfurt	Berlin
20:00 CEST (UTC+2)	Nkunku 71', (yellow card) 90+1'; Laimer (yellow card) 81'; Szoboszlai 85'	Report	Götze (yellow card) 77'; Kolo Muani (yellow card) 90+2'	Stadium: Olympiastadion; Attendance: 74,322; Referee: Daniel Siebert

=== DFL-Supercup ===
30 July 2022 Final	RB Leipzig	3–5	Bayern Munich	Leipzig
20:30 CEST (UTC+2)	Simaken (yellow card) 36'; Halstenberg 59'; Nkunku 77' (pen.); Olmo 89'; Klostermann (yellow card) 90+2'	Report	Musiala 14'; Mané 31'; Pavard 45'; Kimmich (yellow card) 64'; Gnabry 66'; Hernandez (yellow card) 73'; Sané (yellow card) 87', (goal) 90+8'; Neuer (yellow card) 90+7'	Stadium: Red Bull Arena; Attendance: 47,069; Referee: Robert Schröder

=== UEFA Champions League ===
==== Group stage ====
The draw for the group stage was held on 25 August 2022.

Pos	Team	Pld	W	D	L	GF	GA	GD	Pts	Qualification	RMA	RBL	SHK	CEL
1	(Spain) Real Madrid	6	4	1	1	15	6	+9	13	Advance to knockout phase	—	2–0	2–1	5–1
2	(Germany) RB Leipzig	6	4	0	2	13	9	+4	12	Advance to knockout phase	3–2	—	1–4	3–1
3	(Ukraine) Shakhtar Donetsk	6	1	3	2	8	10	−2	6	Transfer to Europa League	1–1	0–4	—	1–1
4	(Scotland) Celtic	6	0	2	4	4	15	−11	2		0–3	0–2	1–1	—

Source: UEFA
Rules for classification: Group stage tiebreakers

6 September 2022 1	RB Leipzig (Germany)	1–4	(Ukraine) Shakhtar Donetsk	Leipzig
21:00 CEST (UTC+2)	Simakan 57', (yellow card) 61'	Report	Shved 16', 58'; Konoplya (yellow card) 50'; Trubin (yellow card) 60'; Mudryk (yellow card) 61', (goal) 76'; Traoré 85'; Đurasek (yellow card) 90'	Stadium: Red Bull Arena; Attendance: 41,591; Referee: João Pinheiro (Portugal)

14 September 2022 2	Real Madrid (Spain)	2–0	(Germany) RB Leipzig	Madrid, Spain
21:00 CEST (UTC+2)	Valverde 80'; Carvajal (yellow card) 84'; Asensio 90+1'	Report	Haidara (yellow card) 73'; Nkunku (yellow card) 82'; Schlager (yellow card) 90+1'	Stadium: Santiago Bernabéu; Attendance: 54,289; Referee: Maurizio Mariani (Italy)

5 October 2022 3	RB Leipzig (Germany)	3–1	(Scotland) Celtic	Leipzig
18:45 CEST (UTC+2)	Nkunku 27'; Kampl (yellow card) 54'; Silva 64', 77'	Report	Jota 47'; O'Riley (yellow card) 59'	Stadium: Red Bull Arena; Attendance: 45,228; Referee: Espen Eskås (Norway)

11 October 2022 4	Celtic (Scotland)	0–2	(Germany) RB Leipzig	Glasgow, Scotland
21:00 CEST (UTC+2)	Hatate (yellow card) 34'; Juranović (yellow card) 90+1'	Report	Werner 75'; Forsberg 84'	Stadium: Celtic Park; Attendance: 57,565; Referee: Halil Umut Meler (Turkey)

25 October 2022 5	RB Leipzig (Germany)	3–2	(Spain) Real Madrid	Leipzig
21:00 CEST (UTC+2)	Gvardiol 13'; Nkunku 18'; Werner 81'	Report	Vinícius 44'; Vázquez (yellow card) 49'; Rodrygo 90+3' (pen.)	Stadium: Red Bull Arena; Attendance: 45,228; Referee: Daniele Orsato (Italy)

2 November 2022 6	Shakhtar Donetsk (Ukraine)	0–4	(Germany) RB Leipzig	Warsaw, Poland (Note: Due to the Russian invasion of Ukraine, Ukrainian teams were required to play their home matches at neutral venues until further notice. Therefore, Shakhtar Donetsk played their home matches at Stadion Wojska Polskiego, Warsaw, Poland, instead of their regular stadium Donbas Arena, Donetsk.)
18:45 CET (UTC+1)	Mykhaylichenko (yellow card) 24'; Lucas Taylor (yellow card) 66'; Sikan (yellow card) 89'	Report	Nkunku 10'; Silva 50'; Szoboszlai 62'; Bondar 68' (o.g.)	Stadium: Stadion Wojska Polskiego; Attendance: 26,045; Referee: Michael Oliver (England)

==== Knockout phase ====
===== Round of 16 =====
The draw for the round of 16 was held on 7 November 2022.

22 February 2023 First leg	RB Leipzig (Germany)	1–1	(England) Manchester City	Leipzig
21:00 CET (UTC+1)	Gvardiol 70'; Henrichs (yellow card) 89'	Report	Mahrez 27'	Stadium: Red Bull Arena; Attendance: 45,228; Referee: Serdar Gözübüyük (Netherlands)

14 March 2023 Second leg	Manchester City (England)	7–0 (8–1 agg.)	(Germany) RB Leipzig	Manchester, England
20:00 GMT (UTC±0)	Haaland 22' (pen.), 24', 45+2', 53', 57'; Gündoğan 49'; De Bruyne (yellow card) 67', (goal) 90+2'; Akanji (yellow card) 77'	Report	Henrichs (yellow card) 21'; Werner (yellow card) 34'	Stadium: City of Manchester Stadium; Attendance: 52,038; Referee: Slavko Vinčić (Slovenia)

== Statistics ==
=== Appearances and goals ===
No.	Pos	Nat	Player	Total		Bundesliga		DFB-Pokal		DFL-Supercup		Champions League	
No.	Pos	Nat	Player	Apps	Goals	Apps	Goals	Apps	Goals	Apps	Goals	Apps	Goals
Goalkeepers
1	GK	(Hungary) HUN	Péter Gulácsi	10	0	6	0	0	0	1	0	3	0
13	GK	(Norway) NOR	Ørjan Nyland	3	0	2	0	1	0	0	0	0	0
21	GK	(Germany) GER	Janis Blaswich	33	0	23	0	4	0	0	0	5+1	0
34	GK	(Germany) GER	Jonas Nickisch	0	0	0	0	0	0	0	0	0	0
36	GK	(Germany) GER	Timo Schlieck	0	0	0	0	0	0	0	0	0	0
Defenders
2	DF	(France) FRA	Mohamed Simakan	33	3	14+6	1	4+1	1	1	0	6+1	1
4	DF	(Hungary) HUN	Willi Orbán	43	4	29	3	5	1	1	0	8	0
16	DF	(Germany) GER	Lukas Klostermann	16	0	7+4	0	0+3	0	1	0	1	0
22	DF	(Germany) GER	David Raum	39	0	19+8	0	3+1	0	0	0	6+2	0
23	DF	(Germany) GER	Marcel Halstenberg	35	2	15+12	1	2+1	0	1	1	2+2	0
25	DF	(Germany) GER	Sanoussy Ba	3	0	0+1	0	0+2	0	0	0	0	0
32	DF	(Croatia) CRO	Joško Gvardiol	39	3	23+5	1	4+1	0	0	0	6	2
37	DF	(Senegal) SEN	Abdou Diallo	14	1	5+2	1	1+1	0	0	0	2+3	0
39	DF	(Germany) GER	Benjamin Henrichs	40	4	21+6	2	3+2	2	1	0	1+6	0
Midfielders
7	MF	(Spain) ESP	Dani Olmo	27	5	12+8	2	2+1	2	0+1	1	0+3	0
8	MF	(Mali) MLI	Amadou Haidara	39	2	11+16	2	3+1	0	0+1	0	4+3	0
10	MF	(Sweden) SWE	Emil Forsberg	39	9	14+12	6	3+1	2	1	0	4+4	1
17	MF	(Hungary) HUN	Dominik Szoboszlai	41	7	25+2	4	5	2	1	0	8	1
24	MF	(Austria) AUT	Xaver Schlager	29	1	16+3	1	2+1	0	0	0	7	0
27	MF	(Austria) AUT	Konrad Laimer	24	2	13+4	1	3	1	1	0	3	0
44	MF	(Slovenia) SLO	Kevin Kampl	35	1	16+10	1	1+2	0	1	0	3+2	0
Forwards
9	FW	(Denmark) DEN	Yussuf Poulsen	24	3	3+13	1	1+2	2	0	0	0+5	0
11	FW	(Germany) GER	Timo Werner	36	16	20+4	9	4	5	0	0	7+1	2
18	FW	(France) FRA	Christopher Nkunku	31	19	16+5	13	1+1	2	1	1	6+1	3
19	FW	(Portugal) POR	André Silva	43	9	19+11	4	3+1	2	0+1	0	6+2	3
Players transferred out during the season
3	DF	(Spain) ESP	Angeliño	0	0	0	0	0	0	0	0	0	0
26	MF	(Guinea) GUI	Ilaix Moriba	0	0	0	0	0	0	0	0	0	0
35	FW	(Norway) NOR	Alexander Sørloth	1	0	0+1	0	0	0	0	0	0	0
37	FW	(Nigeria) NGR	Ademola Lookman	0	0	0	0	0	0	0	0	0	0
38	FW	(Spain) ESP	Hugo Novoa	11	1	2+5	1	0+2	0	0+1	0	0+1	0

Source: Competitions

=== Goalscorers ===
Rank	No.	Pos.	Nat.	Player	Bundesliga	DFB-Pokal	DFL-Supercup	Champions League	Total
1	18	FW	(France)	Christopher Nkunku	16	3	1	3	23
2	11	FW	(Germany)	Timo Werner	9	5	0	2	16
3	10	MF	(Sweden)	Emil Forsberg	6	2	0	1	9
3	19	FW	(Portugal)	André Silva	4	2	0	3	9
6	17	DF	(Hungary)	Dominik Szoboszlai	6	2	0	1	9
6	7	MF	(Spain)	Dani Olmo	2	2	1	0	5
7	2	DF	(France)	Mohamed Simakan	1	1	0	1	3
7	4	DF	(Hungary)	Willi Orban	3	1	0	0	4
7	9	FW	(Denmark)	Yussuf Poulsen	1	2	0	0	3
7	32	DF	(Croatia)	Joško Gvardiol	1	0	0	2	3
7	39	DF	(Germany)	Benjamin Henrichs	2	2	0	0	4
12	23	DF	(Germany)	Marcel Halstenberg	1	0	1	0	2
12	27	MF	(Austria)	Konrad Laimer	2	1	0	0	3
14	8	MF	(Mali)	Amadou Haidara	1	0	0	0	1
14	22	DF	(Germany)	David Raum	1	0	0	0	1
14	24	MF	(Austria)	Xaver Schlager	1	0	0	0	1
14	38	FW	(Spain)	Hugo Novoa	1	0	0	0	1
14	37	FW	(Senegal)	Abdou Diallo	1	0	0	0	1
Own goals					0	0	0	1	1
Totals					50	17	3	14	84
