= Kevin Kampl =

Slovenian footballer (born 1990)

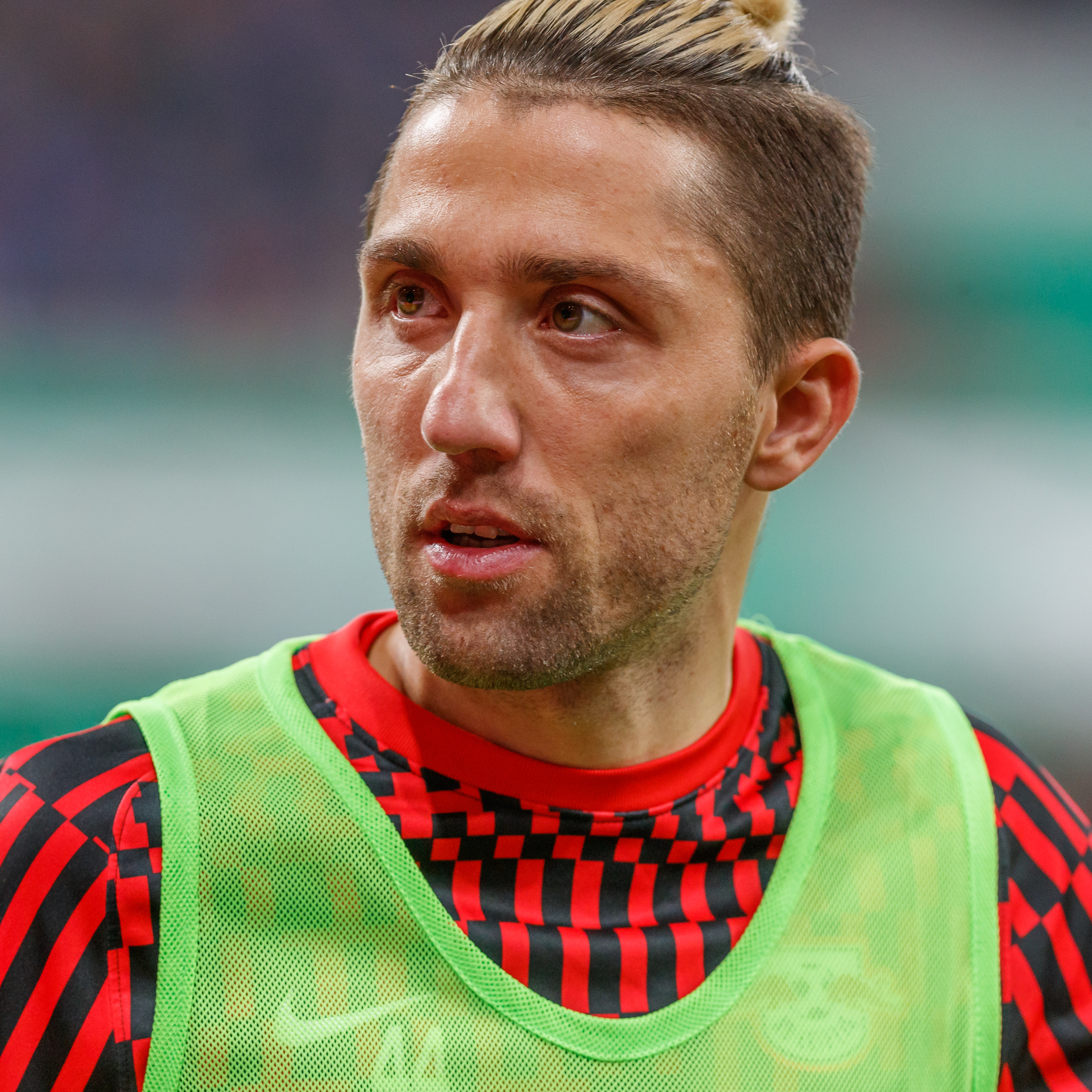
- Kampl with RB Leipzig in 2022

Personal information
- Date of birth: 9 October 1990 (age 36)
- Place of birth: Solingen, Germany
- Height: 1.78 m (5 ft 10 in)
- Position: Midfielder

Youth career
- 1994–1997: VfB Solingen
- 1997–2009: Bayer Leverkusen

Senior career*
| Years | Team | Apps | (Gls) |
| 2009–2011 | Bayer Leverkusen II | 36 | (5) |
| 2010–2011 | Bayer Leverkusen | 0 | (0) |
| 2010 | → Greuther Fürth (loan) | 1 | (0) |
| 2010 | → Greuther Fürth II (loan) | 7 | (0) |
| 2011–2012 | VfL Osnabrück | 35 | (2) |
| 2012 | VfR Aalen | 3 | (2) |
| 2012–2014 | Red Bull Salzburg | 74 | (18) |
| 2015 | Borussia Dortmund | 14 | (0) |
| 2015–2017 | Bayer Leverkusen | 53 | (4) |
| 2017–2026 | RB Leipzig | 203 | (9) |
| Total | | 426 | (40) |

International career
| 2009 | Slovenia U20 | 1 | (0) |
| 2009–2012 | Slovenia U21 | 17 | (1) |
| 2012–2018 | Slovenia | 28 | (2) |
- * Club domestic league appearances and goals

Kevin Kampl (born 9 October 1990) is a former professional footballer who played as a midfielder.

Born in Germany, he represented Slovenia at both youth and senior level, earning 28 caps for the latter.

== Early life ==
Kampl was born in Solingen, Germany. His parents moved to Germany from Maribor, a city near the Austrian border in northeastern Slovenia. Kampl has dual citizenship and could have played for Germany, but opted for Slovenia early on.

== Club career ==
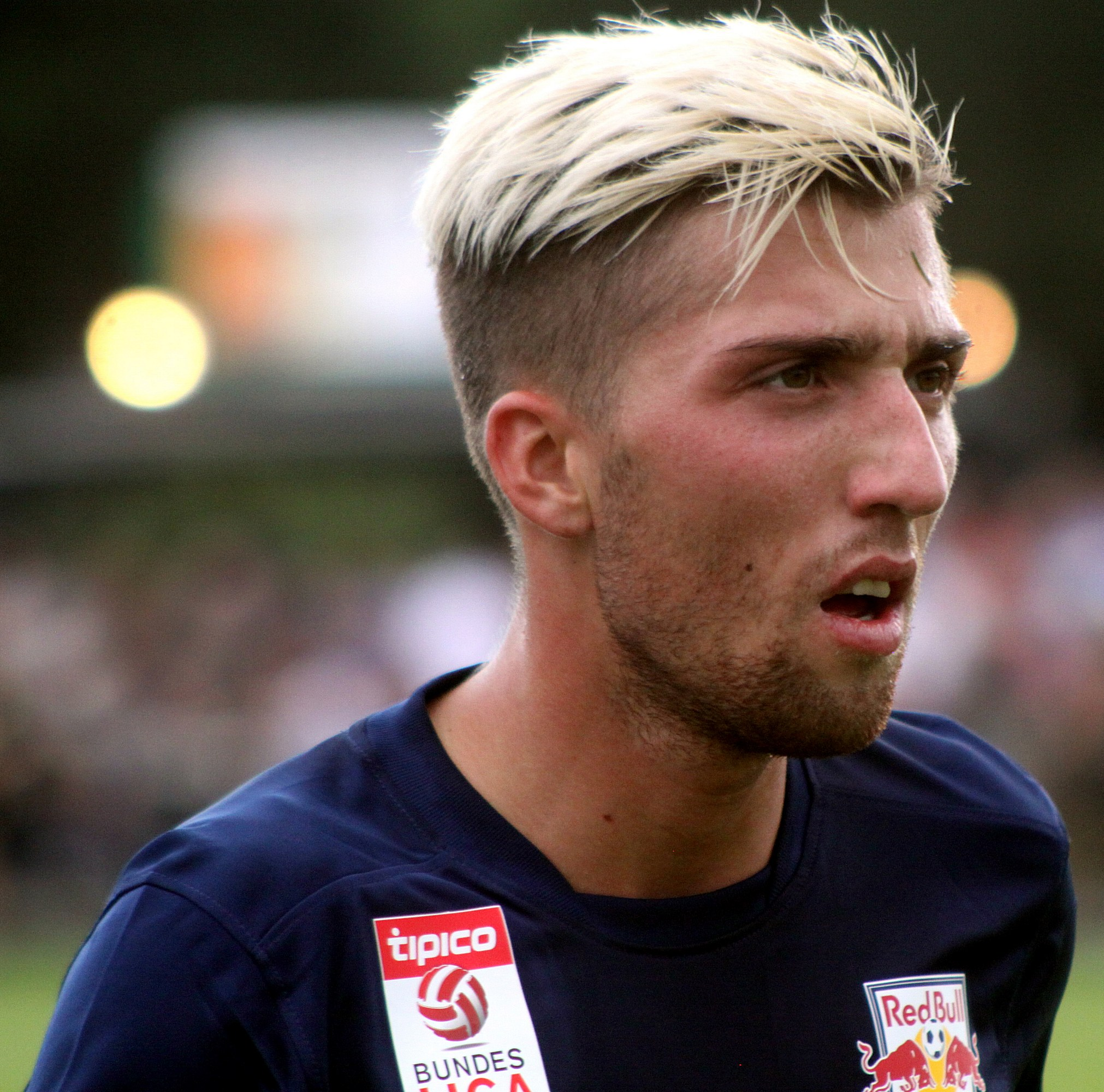
Kampl with Red Bull Salzburg in 2014

=== Early career ===
Kampl began his career with the reserve team of Bayer Leverkusen, where he played in the German fourth division.

On 30 August 2010, Kampl signed a one-season loan contract with SpVgg Greuther Fürth. He made his first team debut on 29 October 2010 as a late substitute in a 2. Bundesliga tie with Erzgebirge Aue. After only half a season for Greuther Fürth, he returned to Bayer Leverkusen during the 2010–11 winter transfer window. Kampl made his Leverkusen 2010–11 season debut as a second-half substitute in the UEFA Europa League game against Metalist Kharkiv.

In the summer of 2011, Kampl transferred to 3. Liga side VfL Osnabrück. After having played a great season for Osnabrück, he joined newly promoted 2. Bundesliga club VfR Aalen for a transfer fee of €250,000. However, he played only four matches for Aalen, scoring two goals and assisting another three.

This start drew the attention of well-financed Austrian champions Red Bull Salzburg and they acquired him just before the end of the transfer window by fulfilling his release clause in the amount of €3 million. Kampl was nominated for the best player of the Austrian Bundesliga at the beginning of the 2013–14 season, but had to eventually concede to Philipp Hosiner.

=== Borussia Dortmund ===
On 22 December 2014, it was announced that he would join Borussia Dortmund on a five-year contract for a €12 million fee on 1 January 2015. He was originally going to RB Leipzig. He made his debut on 31 January 2015. On 28 April 2015, in the DFB-Pokal semi-final against Bayern Munich, Kampl came on in the 83rd minute for Jakub Błaszczykowski and was sent–off after receiving a second yellow card; Dortmund went through to the final via a penalty shoot-out.

=== Bayer Leverkusen ===
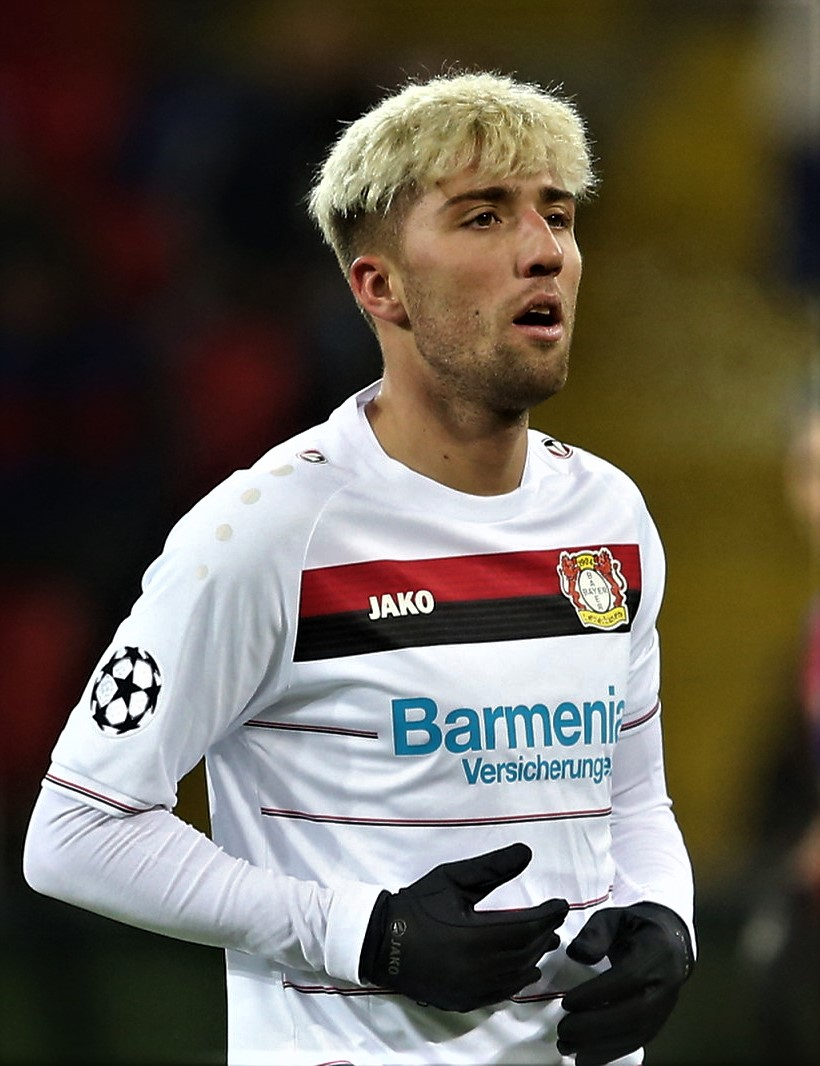
Kampl with Bayer Leverkusen in 2016

On 28 August 2015, Kampl returned to Bayer Leverkusen on a five-year deal. He made his debut on 12 September 2015 versus SV Darmstadt 98. On 26 September, Kampl scored his first goal for Leverkusen in a 3–0 away win against Werder Bremen. Later, on 20 October, he scored his first UEFA Champions League goal in a 4–4 home group stage draw against Roma.

=== RB Leipzig ===
On 31 August 2017, Kampl joined RB Leipzig on a four-year contract for a transfer fee of €20 million. He made his debut for the club on 8 September, setting up Timo Werner's second goal in a 2–0 win away at Hamburger SV. Five days later, he was part of the club's first ever starting eleven in the UEFA Champions League, a 1–1 draw with AS Monaco.

On 20 September 2018, Kampl captained Leipzig for the first time in a UEFA Europa League match against his former club Salzburg.

Kampl was part of the Leipzig team that made four DFB-Pokal finals in five years between 2019 and 2023, lifting the trophy in 2022 and 2023. Along with Willi Orban, Lukas Klostermann, Emil Forsberg, Konrad Laimer, Amadou Haidara and Marcel Halstenberg, he was one of seven players to have featured in all four of the club’s finals.

On 19 October 2023, Kampl extended his contract with RB Leipzig until June 2026.

On 3 January 2026, Kampl and Leipzig agreed to terminate his contract at the end of January due to personal reasons, and he subsequently retired from professional football.

== International career ==
Kampl made his senior debut for Slovenia on 12 October 2012, starting in a 2–0 away win against Cyprus. He scored his first goal on 6 September 2013 against Albania, which Slovenia won 1–0. Kampl scored his second goal in a UEFA Euro 2016 qualifying match against San Marino, the second of their 6–0 win. In October 2016, the Slovenian squad released a statement "condemning Kampl's absence from both games." In response, Kampl stated "Firstly, I always play with pride and happiness for Slovenia and I intend to do so in the future, and secondly, I have made it clear I will be available next time, I just need some rest now."

Kampl retired from the national team in late 2018 for personal reasons. He earned 28 caps and scored 2 goals.

== Career statistics ==
=== Club ===
Appearances and goals by club, season and competition
| Club | Season | League | | | National cup (Note: Includes DFB-Pokal, Austrian Cup) | | Europe | | Other | | Total | |
| Club | Season | Division | Apps | Goals | Apps | Goals | Apps | Goals | Apps | Goals | Apps | Goals |
|---|---|---|---|---|---|---|---|---|---|---|---|---|
| Bayer Leverkusen II | 2008–09 | Regionalliga West | 1 | 0 | — | | — | | — | | 1 | 0 |
| Bayer Leverkusen II | 2009–10 | Regionalliga West | 21 | 1 | — | | — | | — | | 21 | 1 |
| Bayer Leverkusen II | 2010–11 | Regionalliga West | 14 | 4 | — | | — | | — | | 14 | 4 |
| Bayer Leverkusen II | Total | | 36 | 5 | — | | — | | — | | 36 | 5 |
| Greuther Fürth | 2010–11 | 2. Bundesliga | 1 | 0 | 0 | 0 | — | | — | | 1 | 0 |
| Greuther Fürth II | 2010–11 | Regionalliga Süd | 7 | 0 | — | | — | | — | | 7 | 0 |
| Bayer Leverkusen | 2010–11 | Bundesliga | 0 | 0 | 0 | 0 | 1 (Note: Appearances in UEFA Europa League) | 0 | — | | 1 | 0 |
| VfL Osnabrück | 2011–12 | 3. Liga | 35 | 2 | 1 | 0 | — | | — | | 36 | 2 |
| VfR Aalen | 2012–13 | 2. Bundesliga | 3 | 2 | 1 | 0 | — | | — | | 4 | 2 |
| Red Bull Salzburg | 2012–13 | Austrian Bundesliga | 23 | 4 | 4 | 0 | 0 | 0 | — | | 27 | 4 |
| Red Bull Salzburg | 2013–14 | Austrian Bundesliga | 33 | 9 | 5 | 2 | 13 (Note: Two appearances in UEFA Champions League, eleven appearances and three goals in UEFA Europa League) | 3 | — | | 51 | 14 |
| Red Bull Salzburg | 2014–15 | Austrian Bundesliga | 18 | 5 | 3 | 2 | 10 (Note: Four appearances in UEFA Champions League, six appearances and four goals in UEFA Europa League) | 4 | — | | 31 | 11 |
| Red Bull Salzburg | Total | | 74 | 18 | 12 | 4 | 23 | 7 | — | | 109 | 29 |
| Borussia Dortmund | 2014–15 | Bundesliga | 13 | 0 | 2 | 0 | 1 (Note: Appearances in UEFA Champions League) | 0 | — | | 16 | 0 |
| Borussia Dortmund | 2015–16 | Bundesliga | 1 | 0 | 0 | 0 | 2 | 0 | — | | 3 | 0 |
| Borussia Dortmund | Total | | 14 | 0 | 2 | 0 | 3 | 0 | — | | 19 | 0 |
| Bayer Leverkusen | 2015–16 | Bundesliga | 22 | 3 | 3 | 0 | 6 | 1 | — | | 31 | 4 |
| Bayer Leverkusen | 2016–17 | Bundesliga | 30 | 1 | 2 | 0 | 7 | 1 | — | | 39 | 2 |
| Bayer Leverkusen | 2017–18 | Bundesliga | 1 | 0 | 1 | 0 | 0 | 0 | — | | 2 | 0 |
| Bayer Leverkusen | Total | | 53 | 4 | 6 | 0 | 13 | 2 | — | | 72 | 6 |
| RB Leipzig | 2017–18 | Bundesliga | 26 | 1 | 1 | 0 | 10 (Note: Six appearances in UEFA Champions League, four appearances in UEFA Europa League) | 0 | — | | 37 | 1 |
| RB Leipzig | 2018–19 | Bundesliga | 27 | 2 | 5 | 0 | 8 | 1 | — | | 40 | 3 |
| RB Leipzig | 2019–20 | Bundesliga | 11 | 2 | 0 | 0 | 4 | 0 | — | | 15 | 2 |
| RB Leipzig | 2020–21 | Bundesliga | 27 | 0 | 5 | 0 | 7 | 0 | — | | 39 | 0 |
| RB Leipzig | 2021–22 | Bundesliga | 27 | 0 | 5 | 0 | 8 (Note: Three appearances in UEFA Champions League, five appearances in UEFA Europa League) | 0 | — | | 40 | 0 |
| RB Leipzig | 2022–23 | Bundesliga | 30 | 2 | 4 | 0 | 5 | 0 | 1 (Note: Appearance in DFL-Supercup) | 0 | 40 | 2 |
| RB Leipzig | 2023–24 | Bundesliga | 26 | 1 | 2 | 0 | 7 | 0 | 0 | 0 | 35 | 1 |
| RB Leipzig | 2024–25 | Bundesliga | 26 | 1 | 3 | 0 | 5 | 0 | — | | 34 | 1 |
| RB Leipzig | 2025–26 | Bundesliga | 3 | 0 | 0 | 0 | — | | — | | 3 | 0 |
| RB Leipzig | Total | | 203 | 9 | 25 | 0 | 54 | 1 | 1 | 0 | 283 | 10 |
| Career total | | | 426 | 40 | 47 | 4 | 94 | 10 | 1 | 0 | 568 | 54 |

=== International ===
Appearances and goals by national team and year
| National team | Year | Apps | Goals |
|---|---|---|---|
| Slovenia | 2012 | 3 | 0 |
| Slovenia | 2013 | 6 | 1 |
| Slovenia | 2014 | 5 | 0 |
| Slovenia | 2015 | 7 | 1 |
| Slovenia | 2016 | 3 | 0 |
| Slovenia | 2017 | 1 | 0 |
| Slovenia | 2018 | 3 | 0 |
| Total | | 28 | 2 |

Scores and results list Slovenia's goal tally first, score column indicates score after each Kampl goal.

List of international goals scored by Kevin Kampl
| No. | Date | Venue | Cap | Opponent | Score | Result | Competition |
|---|---|---|---|---|---|---|---|
| 1 | 6 September 2013 | Stožice Stadium, Ljubljana, Slovenia | 6 | Albania | 1–0 | 1–0 | 2014 FIFA World Cup qualification |
| 2 | 27 March 2015 | Stožice Stadium, Ljubljana, Slovenia | 15 | San Marino | 2–0 | 6–0 | UEFA Euro 2016 qualification |

== Honours ==
Red Bull Salzburg

- Austrian Bundesliga: 2013–14
- Austrian Cup: 2013–14

RB Leipzig

- DFB-Pokal: 2021–22, 2022–23
- DFL-Supercup: 2023

Individual

- Slovenian Footballer of the Year: 2013, 2014
- Kicker Bundesliga Team of the Season: 2015–16

== See also ==
- Slovenian international players
