= 2012–13 VfR Aalen season =

VfR Aalen
2012–13 season
- Stadium: Scholz-Arena, Aalen, Germany
- 2.Bundesliga: 9th
- DFB-Pokal: Second round
Home colours	Away colours

The 2012–13 VfR Aalen season was the 92nd season in the club's football history. The club competed in the 2. Bundesliga, the second tier of German football. It was the club's first-ever season in this league, having won promotion from the 3. Liga in 2011–12.

The club also took part in the DFB-Pokal, the German Cup, where it reached the second round, losing 4–1 to Bundesliga side Borussia Dortmund.

== Pre-season ==
Win Draw Loss Postponed

20 July 2012	VfR Aalen	0 – 2	Eintracht Frankfurt	Crailsheim, Germany
19:00 CEST		(report)	Alexander Meier 16' 57'	Stadium: Schönebürgstadion; Attendance: 1,650

== Competitions ==
=== 2. Bundesliga ===
==== League table ====
Pos	Team	Pld	W	D	L	GF	GA	GD	Pts	Promotion, qualification or relegation
7	1. FC Union Berlin	34	13	10	11	50	49	+1	49	
8	Energie Cottbus	34	12	12	10	41	36	+5	48	
9	VfR Aalen	34	12	10	12	40	39	+1	46	
10	FC St. Pauli	34	11	10	13	44	47	−3	43	
11	MSV Duisburg (Note: MSV Duisburg were denied a license for the 2013–14 2. Bundesliga season, and, in accordance with the rules of the DFL (Deutsche Fußball Liga), Duisburg are replaced by the best-placed originally relegated team, SV Sandhausen.) (R)	34	11	10	13	37	49	−12	43	Relegation to 3. Liga

Source: kicker.de
Rules for classification: 1) points; 2) goal difference; 3) number of goals scored.
(R) Relegated

==== Matches ====
Win Draw Loss Postponed

5 August 2012 1	MSV Duisburg	1–4	VfR Aalen	Duisburg
13:30 CEST	Bajić 14'	Report	Reichwein 20'; Dausch 33'; Kampl 46'; Lechleiter 60'	Stadium: Schauinsland-Reisen-Arena; Attendance: 14,377; Referee: Peter Sippel (Munich)

=== DFB-Pokal ===
19 August 2012 First round	VfR Aalen	3–0	FC Ingolstadt	Aalen
16:00 CEST	Lechleiter 15'; Dausch 35'; Valentini 90+3'	Report		Stadium: Städtisches Waldstadion; Attendance: 2,800; Referee: Marcel Unger

30 October 2012 Second round	VfR Aalen	1–4	Borussia Dortmund	Aalen
20:30 CET	Klauß 87'	Report	Hummels 22'; Schmelzer 32'; Götze 50'; Schieber 79'	Stadium: Scholz-Arena; Attendance: 13,251; Referee: Günter Perl
