= Sanoussy Ba =

German footballer (born 2004)

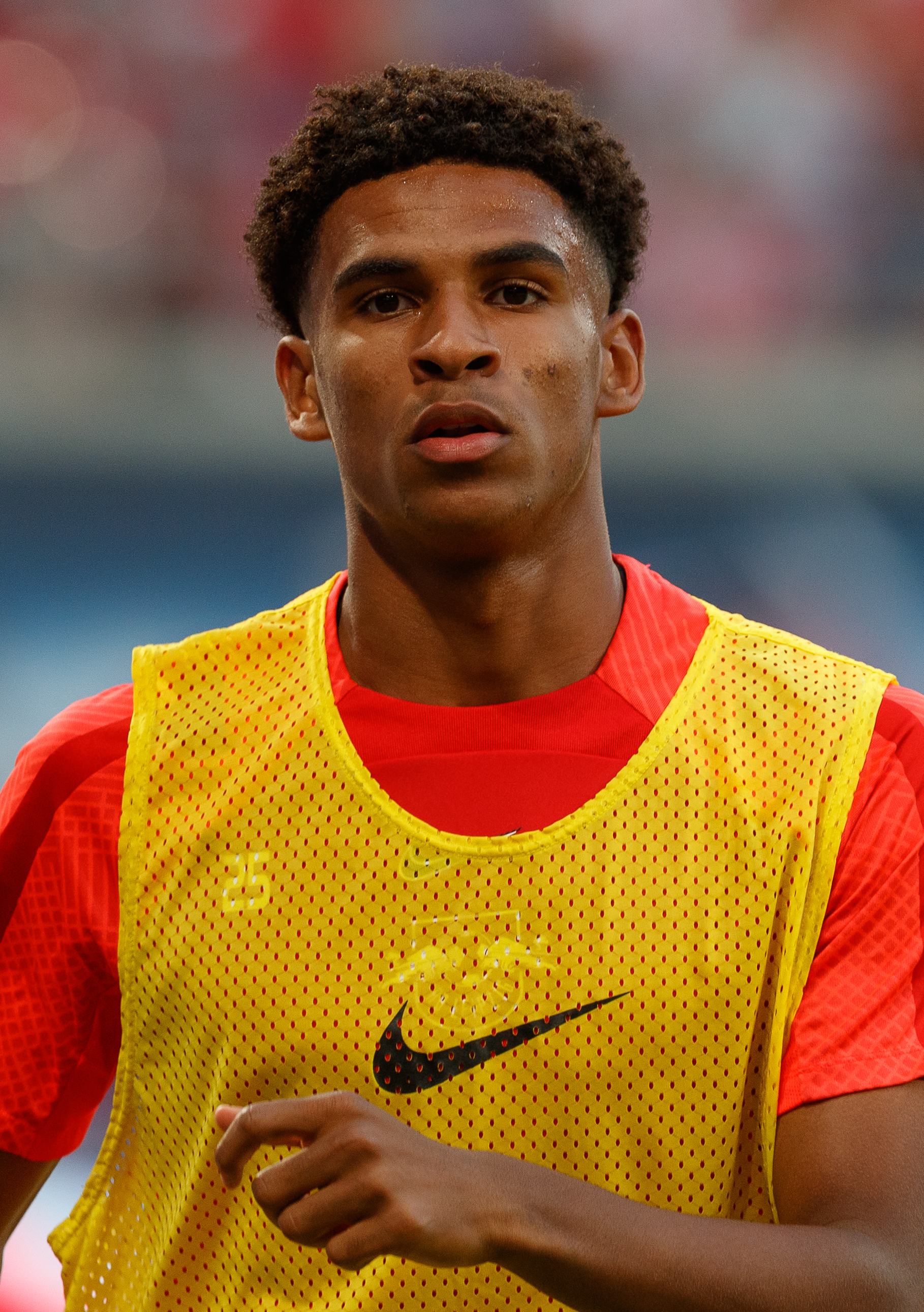
- Ba in 2022

Personal information
- Date of birth: 5 January 2004 (age 22)
- Place of birth: Hof, Germany
- Height: 1.78 m (5 ft 10 in)
- Positions: Left-back; wing-back

Team information
- Current team: Eintracht Braunschweig
- Number: 25

Youth career
- VfB Moschendorf
- –2016: Bayern Hof
- 2016–2022: RB Leipzig

Senior career*
Years	Team	Apps	(Gls)
2022–2024	RB Leipzig	1	(0)
2023–2024	→ LASK (loan)	11	(0)
2024–	Eintracht Braunschweig	11	(0)
2025–	Eintracht Braunschweig II	4	(0)
2026	→ Waldhof Mannheim (loan)	16	(1)

International career^{‡}
2021–2022	Germany U18	4	(0)
2022–2023	Germany U19	3	(0)
- * Club domestic league appearances and goals as of 29 May 2026 ‡ National team caps and goals as of 22:18, 10 May 2023 (UTC)

Sanoussy Ba (born 5 January 2004) is a German professional footballer who plays as a left-back and wing-back for 2. Bundesliga club Eintracht Braunschweig.

== Early life ==
Ba was born in Hof, Bavaria, where he started playing football with VfB Moschendorf, before joining the town's main club, SpVgg Bayern Hof.

== Club career ==
Ba joined RB Leipzig in 2016, where he entered the first team on the summer 2022. During the pre-season, he played the friendly against Klopp's Liverpool.

Ba made his professional debut for RB Leipzig on 30 August 2022, replacing Mohamed Simakan at the hour mark of a 8–0 away Cup win to FC Teutonia Ottensen. He became a regular feature in the match-day squad, both in Bundesliga, and in the Champions League, figuring on the bench during the 2–0 away win against Celtic FC.

On 1 July 2024, Ba signed a three-year contract with Eintracht Braunschweig.

On 28 January 2026, Ba was loaned by Waldhof Mannheim in 3. Liga.

== International career ==
Born in Germany, Ba is of Senegalese descent. He is a youth international for Germany, having started playing with the under-18s in the late summer 2021.

== Style of play ==
An ambidextrous footballer, Ba is able to play both as a full-back or higher, as a wing-back even an offensive winger, always on the left side.

== Career statistics ==
As of match played 19 May 2024

Appearances and goals by club, season and competition
Club	Season	League			National cup		Continental		Other		Total	
Club	Season	Division	Apps	Goals	Apps	Goals	Apps	Goals	Apps	Goals	Apps	Goals
RB Leipzig	2022–23	Bundesliga	1	0	2	0	0	0	0	0	3	0
LASK (loan)	2023–24	Austrian Bundesliga	11	0	2	1	3 (Note: Appearances in UEFA Europa League)	0	—		16	1
Career total			12	0	4	1	3	0	0	0	19	1

== Honours ==
RB Leipzig

- DFB-Pokal: 2022–23
