= Lisa Klostermann =

German footballer (born 1999)

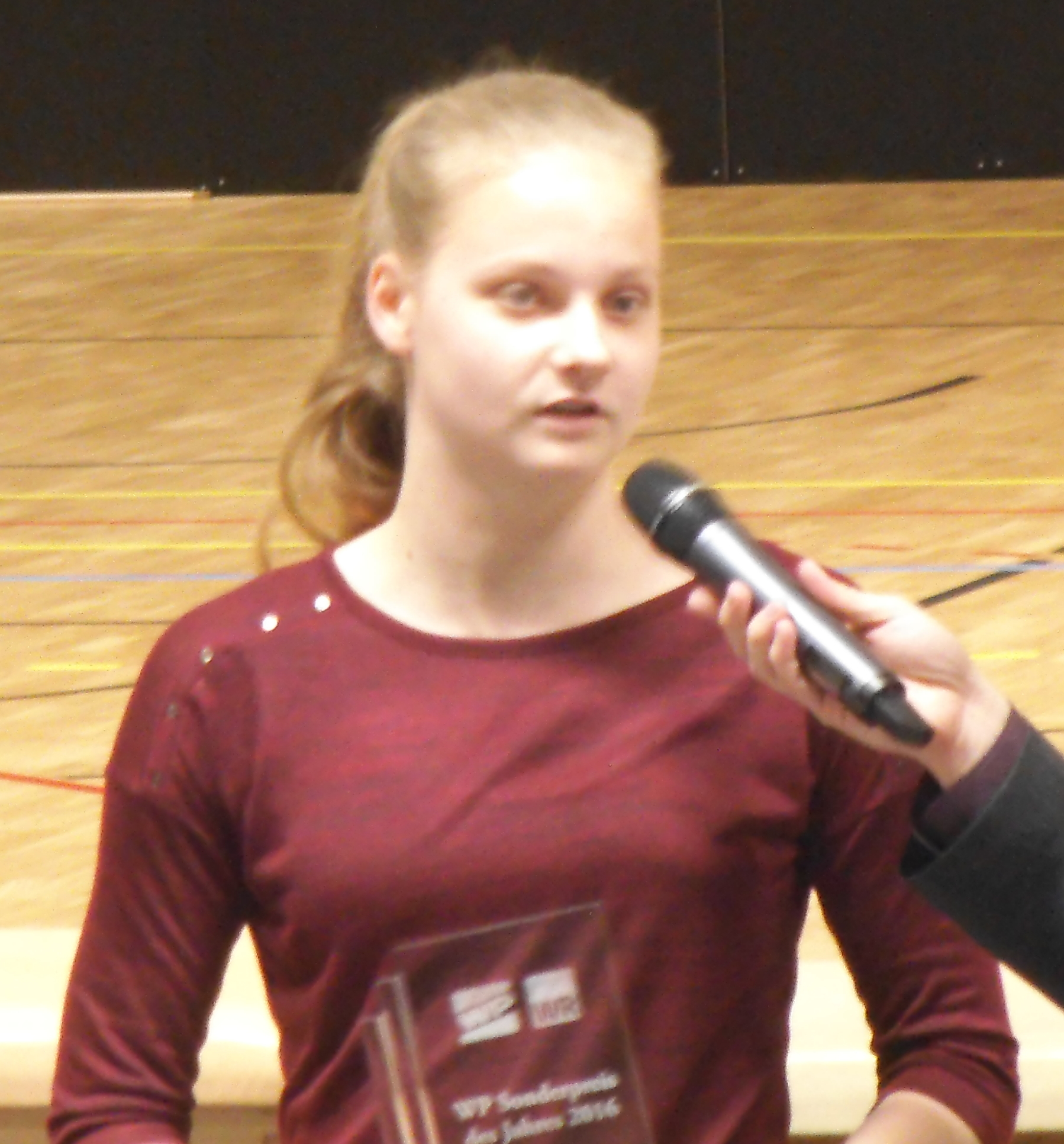
- Klostermann in 2017

Personal information
- Full name: Lisa Katharina Klostermann
- Date of birth: 28 May 1999 (age 27)
- Place of birth: Herdecke, Germany
- Height: 1.77 m (5 ft 10 in)
- Position: Goalkeeper

Youth career
- FSV Gevelsberg

Senior career*
Years	Team	Apps	(Gls)
2017–2018	MSV Duisburg	2	(0)
2018–2021	SGS Essen	2	(0)
2019	SGS Essen II	3	(0)
Total		7	(0)

International career
2018	Germany U19	1	(0)
2017	Germany U20	1	(0)
Medal record
Women's football
Representing Germany
UEFA Women's Under-19 Championship
Runner-up	2018 Switzerland
- * Club domestic league appearances and goals

Lisa Katharina Klostermann (born 28 May 1999) is a German former footballer who played as a goalkeeper.

== Club career ==
Klostermann spent her youth career at FSV Gevelsberg, where she played in men's team with a special permit. On 19 January 2017, MSV Duisburg announced her signing on a contract until June 2018.

In April 2018, Klostermann joined SGS Essen. On 15 January 2020, she extended her contract with the club until June 2022.

In August 2021, Klostermann announced her retirement from football due to injuries.

== International career ==
In September 2016, Klostermann was named in the German squad for the 2016 FIFA U-17 Women's World Cup. She was also part of the team which finished as runners-up at the 2018 UEFA Women's Under-19 Championship.

== Personal life ==
Klostermann's brother Lukas Klostermann is also a footballer.

== Career statistics ==
Appearances and goals by club, season and competition
Club	Season	League			National cup		Total	
Club	Season	Division	Apps	Goals	Apps	Goals	Apps	Goals
MSV Duisburg	2016–17	Frauen-Bundesliga	1	0	0	0	1	0
MSV Duisburg	2017–18	Frauen-Bundesliga	1	0	1	0	2	0
MSV Duisburg	Total		2	0	1	0	3	0
SGS Essen	2018–19	Frauen-Bundesliga	2	0	0	0	2	0
SGS Essen	2019–20	Frauen-Bundesliga	0	0	0	0	0	0
SGS Essen	2020–21	Frauen-Bundesliga	0	0	0	0	0	0
SGS Essen	Total		2	0	0	0	2	0
SGS Essen II	2018–19	2. Frauen-Bundesliga	3	0	—		3	0
Career total			7	0	1	0	8	0

== Honours ==
Germany U19

- UEFA Women's Under-19 Championship runner-up: 2018
