= Xaver Schlager =

Austrian footballer (born 1997)

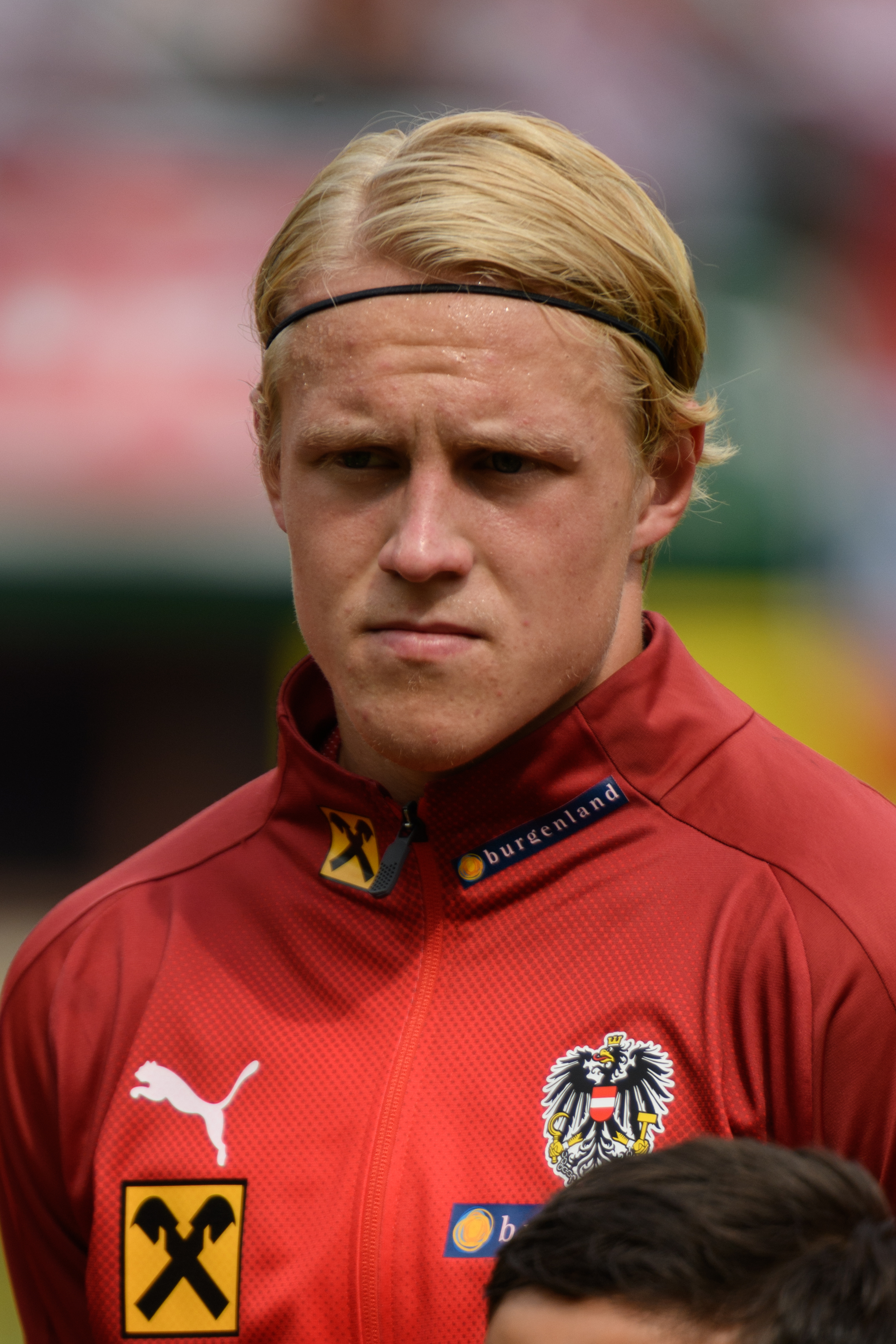
- Schlager with Austria in 2018

Personal information
- Full name: Xaver Schlager
- Date of birth: 28 September 1997 (age 29)
- Place of birth: Linz, Upper Austria, Austria
- Height: 1.74 m (5 ft 9 in)
- Position: Central midfielder

Team information
- Current team: Nottingham Forest
- Number: 21

Youth career
- 2003–2009: St. Valentin
- 2009–2015: Red Bull Salzburg

Senior career*
Years	Team	Apps	(Gls)
2015–2017	FC Liefering	46	(7)
2016–2019	Red Bull Salzburg	67	(7)
2019–2022	VfL Wolfsburg	69	(3)
2022–2026	RB Leipzig	81	(4)
2026–	Nottingham Forest	9	(0)

International career^{‡}
2013	Austria U17	4	(2)
2015–2016	Austria U19	11	(2)
2017–2019	Austria U21	9	(2)
2018–	Austria	59	(4)
- * Club domestic league appearances and goals as of 17:02, 31 October 2026 (UTC) ‡ National team caps and goals as of 18:50, 4 October 2026 (UTC)

Xaver Schlager (German pronunciation: [ˈksaːvɐ ˈʃlaːɡɐ]; born 28 September 1997) is an Austrian professional footballer who plays as a central midfielder for Premier League club Nottingham Forest and the Austria national team.

== Club career ==
=== Red Bull Salzburg ===
After playing for the youth team of St. Valentin, Schlager joined the Red Bull Salzburg Academy in 2011, where he played in all teams. In 2015, Schlager was transferred to FC Liefering, the feeder team of Red Bull Salzburg.

During the 2017–18 season, Salzburg had their best ever European campaign. They finished top of their Europa League group, for a record fourth time, before beating Real Sociedad and Borussia Dortmund thus making their first ever appearance in the UEFA Europa League semi-final. On 3 May 2018, he played in the Europa League semi-finals as Marseille beat Salzburg 3–2 on aggregate to secure a place in the final.

=== VfL Wolfsburg ===
On the 26 June 2019, Schlager signed for Bundesliga club VfL Wolfsburg. During his time with Wolfsburg, Schlager made 81 appearances in all competitions, including 69 in the Bundesliga. He missed 20 league matches through injury during his final season, but still averaged 27 pressures per game whilst producing a goal and two assists.

=== RB Leipzig ===
On 17 June 2022, Schlager joined Bundesliga rivals RB Leipzig, after the club activated a release clause in his Wolfsburg contract, signing a contract until 2026. Schlager helped Leipzig to win the German Cup and German Super Cup in 2023, starting the latter, coming on as substitute in the former.

On 3 May 2024, Schlager was playing for Leipzig against TSG Hoffenheim, when he was substituted off with an injury in an eventual 1–1 draw. Later tests confirmed that his anterior cruciate ligament (ACL) was torn and he underwent surgery, subsequently missing the European Championship in the summer.

In February 2026, Leipzig announced that Schlager would leave the club when his contract would expire in June.

=== Nottingham Forest ===
On 23 July 2026, Schlager joined Premier League side Nottingham Forest as a free agent on a two-year contract. He reunited with Oliver Glasner, who previously was his manager at Wolfsburg.

== International career ==
On 23 March 2018, Schlager debuted for the Austrian senior squad in a friendly 3–0 victory over Slovenia. The same year on 18 September, he scored his first goal in a 2018–19 UEFA Nations League match against Northern Ireland.

He was not included in the 26-man squad for the UEFA Euro 2024, having sustained an ACL injury.

On 18 May 2026, Schlager was selected in Ralf Rangnick’s 26-man squad for the 2026 FIFA World Cup, marking Austria’s first appearance in the tournament since 1998.

== Career statistics ==
=== Club ===
As of match played 31 October 2026

Appearances and goals by club, season and competition
Club	Season	League			National cup (Note: Includes Austrian Cup, DFB-Pokal)		League cup (Note: Includes EFL Cup)		Europe		Other		Total	
Club	Season	Division	Apps	Goals	Apps	Goals	Apps	Goals	Apps	Goals	Apps	Goals	Apps	Goals
FC Liefering	2014–15	Austrian First League	11	0	—		—		—		—		11	0
FC Liefering	2015–16	Austrian First League	22	3	—		—		—		—		22	3
FC Liefering	2016–17	Austrian First League	11	4	—		—		—		—		11	4
FC Liefering	2017–18	Austrian First League	2	0	—		—		—		—		2	0
FC Liefering	Total		46	7	—		—		—		—		46	7
Red Bull Salzburg	2015–16	Austrian Bundesliga	2	0	0	0	—		0	0	—		2	0
Red Bull Salzburg	2016–17	Austrian Bundesliga	13	1	2	0	—		2 (Note: Appearances in UEFA Europa League)	1	—		17	2
Red Bull Salzburg	2017–18	Austrian Bundesliga	26	1	4	0	—		14	0	—		44	1
Red Bull Salzburg	2018–19	Austrian Bundesliga	26	5	6	2	—		12 (Note: Four appearances in UEFA Champions League, eight appearances one goal in UEFA Europa League)	1	—		44	8
Red Bull Salzburg	Total		67	7	12	2	—		28	2	—		107	11
VfL Wolfsburg II	2019–20	Regionalliga Nord	1	0	—		—		—		—		1	0
VfL Wolfsburg	2019–20	Bundesliga	23	1	0	0	—		5	0	—		28	1
VfL Wolfsburg	2020–21	Bundesliga	32	2	3	0	—		3	0	—		38	2
VfL Wolfsburg	2021–22	Bundesliga	14	0	1	0	—		0	0	—		15	0
VfL Wolfsburg	Total		69	3	4	0	—		8	0	—		81	3
RB Leipzig	2022–23	Bundesliga	22	1	4	0	—		7 (Note: Appearances in UEFA Champions League)	0	0	0	33	1
RB Leipzig	2023–24	Bundesliga	29	0	2	0	—		8	1	1 (Note: Appearance in DFL-Supercup)	0	40	1
RB Leipzig	2024–25	Bundesliga	4	0	1	0	—		0	0	—		5	0
RB Leipzig	2025–26	Bundesliga	26	3	4	0	—		—		—		30	3
RB Leipzig	Total		81	4	11	0	—		15	1	1	0	108	5
Nottingham Forest	2026–27	Premier League	9	0	0	0	1	0	—		—		10	0
Career total			273	21	27	2	1	0	51	3	1	0	353	26

=== International ===
As of match played 4 October 2026

Appearances and goals by national team and year
National team	Year	Apps	Goals
Austria	2018	8	1
Austria	2019	3	0
Austria	2020	6	0
Austria	2021	7	0
Austria	2022	9	2
Austria	2023	8	0
Austria	2024	2	1
Austria	2025	6	0
Austria	2026	10	0
Total		59	4

As of match played 26 March 2024
Scores and results list Austria's goal tally first, score column indicates score after each Schlager goal.

List of international goals scored by Xaver Schlager
No.	Date	Venue	Opponent	Score	Result	Competition
1	18 November 2018	Windsor Park, Belfast, Northern Ireland	Northern Ireland	1–0	2–1	2018–19 UEFA Nations League B
2	6 June 2022	Ernst-Happel-Stadion, Vienna, Austria	Denmark	1–1	1–2	2022–23 UEFA Nations League A
3	20 November 2022	Ernst-Happel-Stadion, Vienna, Austria	Italy	1–0	2–0	Friendly
4	26 March 2024	Ernst-Happel-Stadion, Vienna, Austria	Turkey	1–0	6–1	Friendly

== Honours ==
Red Bull Salzburg

- Austrian Bundesliga: 2015–16, 2016–17, 2017–18, 2018–19
- Austrian Cup: 2015–16, 2016–17, 2018–19

RB Leipzig

- DFB-Pokal: 2022–23
- DFL-Supercup: 2023
