= Benjamin Henrichs =

German footballer (born 1997)

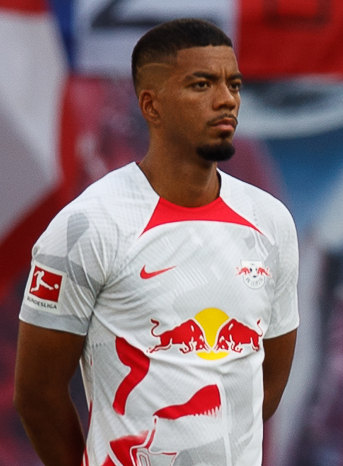
- Henrichs with RB Leipzig in 2022

Personal information
- Full name: Benjamin Paa Kwesi Henrichs
- Date of birth: 23 February 1997 (age 29)
- Place of birth: Bocholt, Germany
- Height: 1.85 m (6 ft 1 in)
- Positions: Full-back; midfielder

Team information
- Current team: RB Leipzig
- Number: 39

Youth career
- –2015: Bayer Leverkusen

Senior career*
Years	Team	Apps	(Gls)
2015–2018	Bayer Leverkusen	62	(0)
2018–2021	Monaco	35	(1)
2020–2021	→ RB Leipzig (loan)	13	(0)
2021–	RB Leipzig	124	(7)

International career^{‡}
2015–2016	Germany U19	2	(1)
2016–2019	Germany U21	17	(0)
2021	Germany Olympic	3	(0)
2016–	Germany	19	(0)
Medal record
Representing Germany
FIFA Confederations Cup
Winner	2017 Russia
UEFA European Under-21 Championship
Runner-up	2019 Italy
- * Club domestic league appearances and goals as of 17:30, 31 October 2026 (UTC) ‡ National team caps and goals as of 13:45, 22 November 2024 (UTC)

Benjamin Paa Kwesi Henrichs (born 23 February 1997) is a German professional footballer who plays as a full-back or midfielder for Bundesliga club RB Leipzig and the Germany national team.

== Club career ==
=== Bayer Leverkusen ===
Henrichs is an academy graduate of Bayer Leverkusen, whom he joined at the age of seven, and captained the side at under-19 level. Having impressed during his formative years with the club, he was promoted to the senior side in 2015 and made his Bundesliga debut on 20 September when he came on as a second-half substitute for Karim Bellarabi in a 3–0 defeat to Borussia Dortmund. He became a regular with the side the following season during which he amassed 29 appearances for the campaign. He ultimately went on to make over 80 appearances for the club across all competitions before signing for Ligue 1 side AS Monaco in August 2018.

=== AS Monaco ===
On 28 August 2018, Henrichs joined Monaco on a five-year contract. Two months later, on 27 October, he scored his first goal in a 2–2 draw against Dijon.

==== RB Leipzig (loan) ====
On 8 July 2020, Henrichs joined RB Leipzig on a season-long loan. The deal included an option to buy for €15 million at the end of the season.

=== RB Leipzig ===
On 12 April 2021, Henrichs joined RB Leipzig on a permanent deal until 2025, in which they activated the €15 million buyout option. Later that year, on 11 December, he scored his first Bundesliga goal in the stoppage time in a 4–1 victory over Borussia Mönchengladbach.

In May 2024, he extended his contract at the club until 2028. By the end of the year, on 20 December, he sustained a torn Achilles tendon in a match against Bayern Munich which would sideline him for the rest of the season.

== International career ==
Henrichs was born in Germany to a German father and a Ghanaian mother and was eligible to represent both nations prior to making his debut for Germany. In a 2017 interview, he revealed that Ghanaian midfielder Michael Essien was his idol growing up but he chose to represent Germany because they were the nation which approached him when he was still a teenager.

=== Germany ===
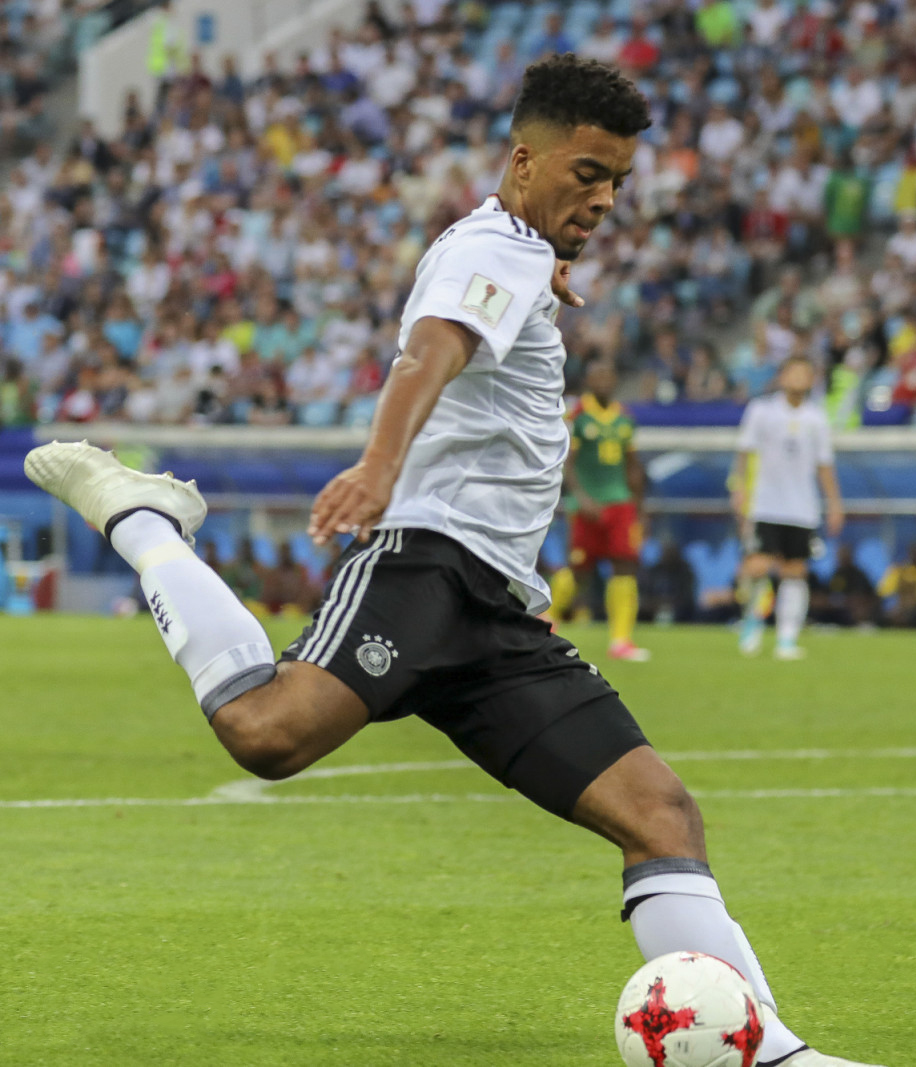
Henrichs with Germany during the 2017 FIFA Confederations Cup

On 4 November 2016, Henrichs was called up to the Germany national side for the first time by manager Joachim Löw for the nation's World Cup qualifier against San Marino and a friendly match against Italy. Seven days later, he made his debut against the former in an 8–0 victory for Germany.

The following year, he was named in Löw's squad for the 2017 FIFA Confederations Cup – the curtain raiser for the 2018 FIFA World Cup – and made two appearances as Germany went on to lift the title. He was later excluded from Germany's World Cup squad.

Henrichs was named in Germany's squad for UEFA Euro 2024.

== Career statistics ==
=== Club ===
As of match played 31 October 2026

Appearances and goals by club, season and competition
Club	Season	League			National cup (Note: Includes DFB-Pokal, Coupe de France)		League cup (Note: Includes Coupe de la Ligue)		Europe		Other		Total	
Club	Season	Division	Apps	Goals	Apps	Goals	Apps	Goals	Apps	Goals	Apps	Goals	Apps	Goals
Bayer Leverkusen	2015–16	Bundesliga	9	0	0	0	—		1 (Note: Appearance in UEFA Europa League)	0	—		10	0
Bayer Leverkusen	2016–17	Bundesliga	29	0	1	0	—		7 (Note: Appearances in UEFA Champions League)	0	—		37	0
Bayer Leverkusen	2017–18	Bundesliga	23	0	5	0	—		0	0	—		28	0
Bayer Leverkusen	2018–19	Bundesliga	1	0	0	0	—		0	0	—		1	0
Bayer Leverkusen	Total		62	0	6	0	—		8	0	—		76	0
Monaco	2018–19	Ligue 1	22	1	1	0	2	0	4	0	—		29	1
Monaco	2019–20	Ligue 1	13	0	1	0	1	0	—		—		15	0
Monaco	Total		35	1	2	0	3	0	4	0	—		44	1
RB Leipzig (loan)	2020–21	Bundesliga	13	0	4	0	—		3	0	—		20	0
RB Leipzig	2021–22	Bundesliga	22	3	5	0	—		10 (Note: Four appearances in UEFA Champions League, six appearances in UEFA Europa League)	0	—		37	3
RB Leipzig	2022–23	Bundesliga	30	2	6	2	—		7	0	1 (Note: Appearance in DFL-Supercup)	0	44	4
RB Leipzig	2023–24	Bundesliga	33	1	2	0	—		6	0	1	0	42	1
RB Leipzig	2024–25	Bundesliga	15	0	3	0	—		6	0	—		24	0
RB Leipzig	2025–26	Bundesliga	17	1	0	0	—		—		—		17	1
RB Leipzig	2026–27	Bundesliga	7	0	2	0	—		1	0	—		10	0
RB Leipzig	Total		137	7	22	2	—		33	0	2	0	194	9
Career total			234	8	30	2	3	0	45	0	2	0	314	10

=== International ===
As of match played 19 November 2024

Appearances and goals by national team and year
National team	Year	Apps	Goals
Germany
Germany	2016	1	0
Germany	2017	2	0
Germany	2020	2	0
Germany	2022	2	0
Germany	2023	6	0
Germany	2024	6	0
Total		19	0

== Honours ==
RB Leipzig

- DFB-Pokal: 2021–22, 2022–23, runner up: 2020–21
- DFL-Supercup: 2023

Germany

- FIFA Confederations Cup: 2017

Individual

- Fritz Walter Medal U19 Gold: 2016
