= Mohamed Simakan =

French footballer (born 2000)

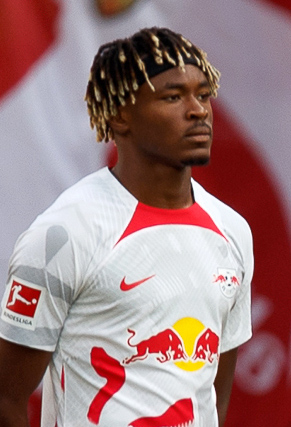
- Simakan with RB Leipzig in 2022

Personal information
- Full name: Mohamed Sanousy Simakan
- Date of birth: 3 May 2000 (age 26)
- Place of birth: Marseille, France
- Height: 1.87 m (6 ft 2 in)
- Positions: Centre-back; right-back

Team information
- Current team: Al-Nassr
- Number: 3

Youth career
- 2008–2009: Vivaux Marronniers
- 2009–2010: FC Bruz
- 2010–2011: FC Rouguière
- 2011–2014: Marseille
- 2014–2015: JO Saint-Gabriel
- 2015–2017: SC Air Bel
- 2017–2019: Strasbourg

Senior career*
Years	Team	Apps	(Gls)
2017–2019	Strasbourg B	24	(1)
2019–2021	Strasbourg	38	(1)
2021–2024	RB Leipzig	85	(4)
2024–	Al-Nassr	62	(4)

International career^{‡}
2019–2021	France U20	2	(1)
2022–2023	France U21	7	(0)
- * Club domestic league appearances and goals as of 20 November 2026 (UTC) ‡ National team caps and goals as of 2 July 2023 (UTC)

Mohamed Sanousy Simakan (born 3 May 2000) is a French professional footballer who plays as a centre-back for Saudi Pro League club Al-Nassr.

== Early life ==
Born in Marseille to Guinean parents, Simakan acquired French nationality on 7 November 2005, through the collective effect of his mother's naturalization.

== Club career ==
=== Strasbourg ===
On 16 May 2018, Simakan signed his first professional contract with Strasbourg. He made his professional debut in a 3–1 UEFA Europa League win over Maccabi Haifa on 25 July 2019.

=== RB Leipzig ===
On 22 March 2021, Simakan agreed to join German club RB Leipzig on a five-year deal for an undisclosed fee, to be effective in the summer of 2021. He made his debut for the club in the First round of the DFB Pokal against SV Sandhausen, which ended in a 4–0 win. He made his Champions League debut on 21 September 2021, in a 2–1 defeat to Club Brugge. Simakan immediately became an important player for the club, taking part in 28 Bundesliga matches, He missed two matches during the season due to the COVID-19 virus. He was also instrumental in the DFB Pokal, where he took part in all the matches on route to Leipzig winning the title.

In his second season with the club, Simaken continued to be an important part of the team, as he played 24 matches in the league, scoring once. On 6 September 2022, he scored his first UEFA Champions League goal in a 4–1 defeat against Shakhtar Donetsk. Simaken participated in 5 matches in the DFB Pokal, where RB Leipzig won the competition for the second straight season, however he was an unused substitute in the final.

On 19 September 2023, he scored the first ever goal of the 2023–24 Champions League season in the 3rd minute of a 3–1 away win over Young Boys.

=== Al-Nassr ===
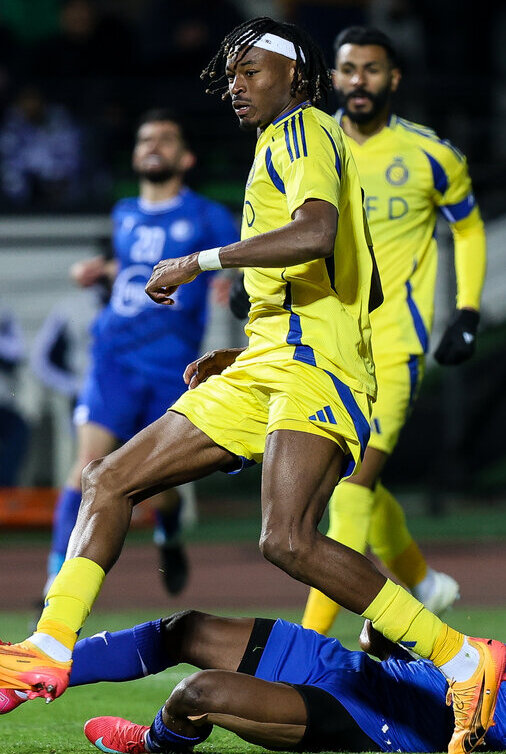
Simakan with Al-Nassr in 2025

On 2 September 2024, Simakan joined Saudi Pro League runners-up Al-Nassr for €45 million. In the 2025–26 Saudi Pro League, his second season with the club, he was a key part of the Al Nassr team that won the title. A regular member in a defence which kept 16 clean sheets in 34 games, he also scored 3 goals, including a 95th-minute winner against Neom.

== International career ==
Thanks to his great performance with Strasbourg in Ligue 1, Simakan was called up by Bernard Diomède to play for France U20 national team. He played his first game as a starter against Slovenia in which he scored a header contributing to his team's 2–2 draw.

== Style of play ==
According to Sofascore.com's football algorithm, Simakan's strengths include ground duels and aerial duels. He is a ball-carrying, aggressive, versatile defender adept at playing either right-back or center-back.

== Career statistics ==
As of match played 12 October 2026

Appearances and goals by club, season and competition
Club	Season	League			National cup (Note: Includes Coupe de France, DFB-Pokal, King's Cup)		Continental		Other		Total	
Club	Season	Division	Apps	Goals	Apps	Goals	Apps	Goals	Apps	Goals	Apps	Goals
Strasbourg B	2017–18	Championnat National 3	18	1	—		—		—		18	1
Strasbourg B	2018–19	Championnat National 3	6	0	—		—		—		6	0
Strasbourg B	Total		24	1	—		—		—		24	1
Strasbourg	2019–20	Ligue 1	19	0	1	0	5 (Note: Appearances in UEFA Europa League)	0	0	0	25	0
Strasbourg	2020–21	Ligue 1	19	1	0	0	—		—		19	1
Strasbourg	Total		38	1	1	0	5	0	0	0	44	1
RB Leipzig	2021–22	Bundesliga	28	1	6	0	7 (Note: Four Appearances in UEFA Champions League, and three appearances in the UEFA Europa League)	0	—		41	1
RB Leipzig	2022–23	Bundesliga	24	1	5	1	7 (Note: Appearances in UEFA Champions League)	1	1 (Note: Appearance in DFL-Supercup)	0	37	3
RB Leipzig	2023–24	Bundesliga	32	2	2	0	7	1	1	0	42	3
RB Leipzig	2024–25	Bundesliga	1	0	1	0	—		—		2	0
RB Leipzig	Total		85	4	14	1	21	2	2	0	122	7
Al-Nassr	2024–25	Saudi Pro League	26	1	2	0	11 (Note: Appearances in AFC Champions League Elite)	0	—		39	1
Al-Nassr	2025–26	Saudi Pro League	28	3	2	1	6 (Note: Appearances in AFC Champions League Two)	1	2 (Note: Appearances in Saudi Super Cup)	0	38	5
Al-Nassr	2026–27	Saudi Pro League	6	0	1	1	2	0	0	0	9	1
Al-Nassr	Total		60	4	5	2	19	1	2	0	86	7
Career total			206	10	20	3	45	3	4	0	275	16

== Honours ==
RB Leipzig

- DFB-Pokal: 2021–22, 2022–23
- DFL-Supercup: 2023

Al-Nassr

- Saudi Pro League: 2025–26
- AFC Champions League Two runner-up: 2025–26
