= Lukas Klostermann =

German footballer (born 1996)

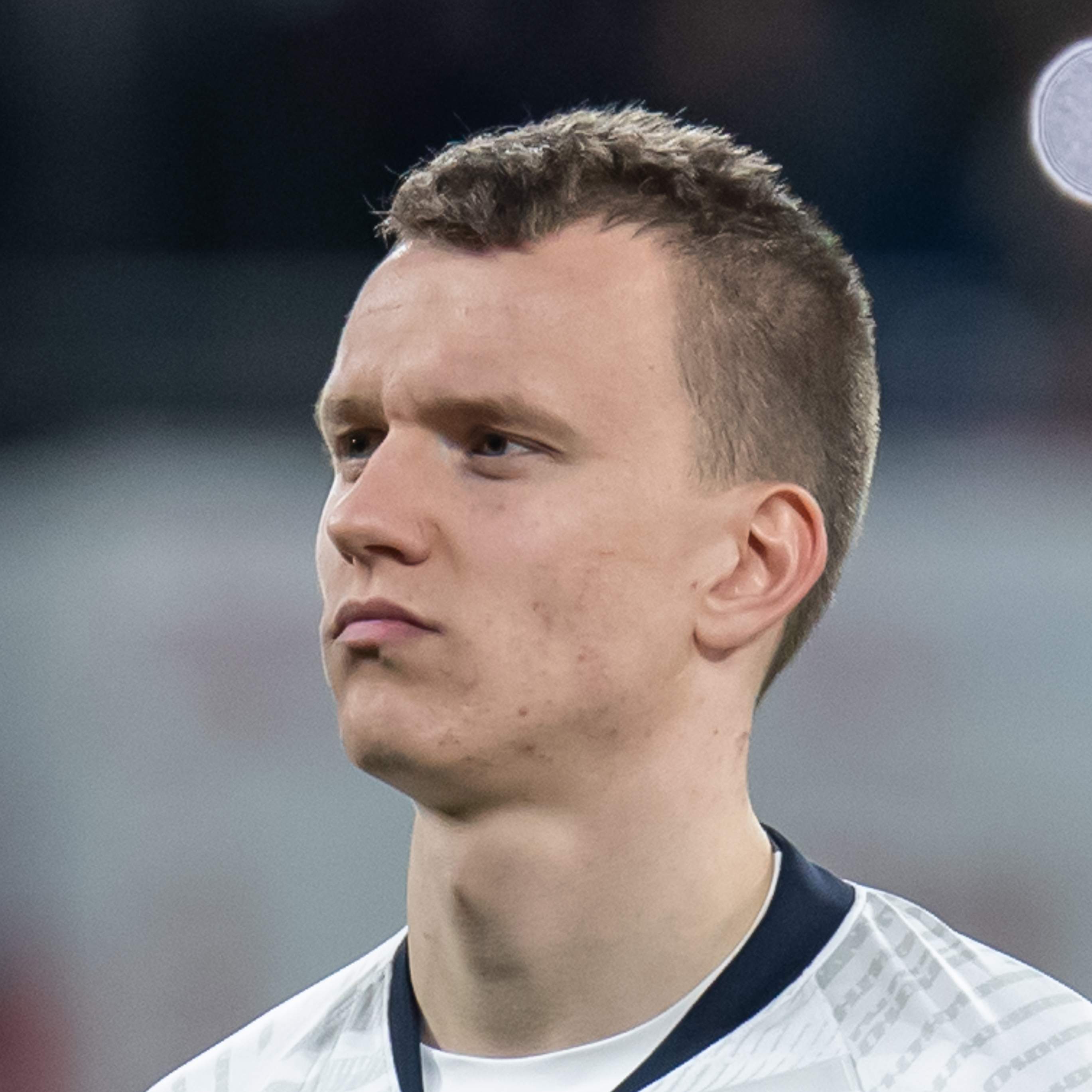
- Klostermann with RB Leipzig in 2020

Personal information
- Full name: Lukas Manuel Klostermann
- Date of birth: 3 June 1996 (age 30)
- Place of birth: Herdecke, Germany
- Height: 1.89 m (6 ft 2 in)
- Positions: Right-back; centre-back

Team information
- Current team: RB Leipzig
- Number: 16

Youth career
- FSV Gevelsberg
- 2001–2010: SSV Hagen
- 2010–2014: VfL Bochum
- 2014: RB Leipzig

Senior career*
Years	Team	Apps	(Gls)
2014	VfL Bochum II	2	(0)
2014	VfL Bochum	9	(0)
2014	RB Leipzig II	2	(1)
2014–	RB Leipzig	247	(14)

International career
2013	Germany U17	6	(0)
2014–2015	Germany U19	8	(0)
2015–2019	Germany U21	22	(2)
2016	Germany Olympic	7	(1)
2019–2023	Germany	22	(0)
Medal record
Men's football
Representing Germany
Olympic Games
Silver medal – second place	2016 Rio de Janeiro	Team
UEFA European Under-21 Championship
Runner-up	2019 Italy
- * Club domestic league appearances and goals as of 20:20, 17 October 2026 (UTC)

Lukas Manuel Klostermann (German pronunciation: [ˈluːkas ˈkloːstɐman]; born 3 June 1996) is a German professional footballer who plays as a right-back or centre-back for Bundesliga club RB Leipzig.

== Club career ==
=== VfL Bochum ===
Born in Herdecke, Germany, Klostermann began playing football when he was "five or six years old". He played for various youth teams at FSV Gevelsberg, SSV Hagen and VfL Bochum. While at FSV Gevelsberg, he played in various positions before settling in defence at VfL Bochum.

After progressing through VfL Bochum's youth system, Klostermann was promoted to the U19 side and then VfL Bochum II. While at VfL Bochum's youth system, Klostermann captained the U17 and U19 side. At some point, he signed a contract with the club, keeping him until 2015. He made his debut for the club, coming on as a second–half substitute, in a 2–0 win over VfR Aalen on 14 March 2014.

At the time of his debut, he appeared at just 17 years and 283 days. Towards the end of the 2013–14 season, Klostermann pushed Paul Freier out of the first team over a right–back position. His handful of first team appearances resulted him being named the club's Player of the Month for May. At the end of the 2013–14 season, he made nine appearances for the side.

By the end of June, it was revealed that Klostermann had yet to sign a professional contract, leading to a start of negotiating. In August 2014 it was announced that Klostermann and VfL Bochum had failed to reach an agreement regarding the extension of his contract.

=== RB Leipzig ===
Subsequently, he did not play another game for Bochum and on 22 August 2014 it was announced that he would transfer to RB Leipzig. He signed for Leipzig on a four-year deal until 2018.

Shortly after joining RB Leipzig, Klostermann was assigned to the U19 and RB Leipzig II. He made his RB Leipzig debut against Erzgebirge Aue in the second round of DFB-Pokal on 29 October 2014 but scored an own–goal and helped the side win 3–1 later in the game. It wasn't until on 12 December 2014 when he made his league debut for the club, where he came on as a late substitute, in a 1–0 win over Greuther Fürth.

He then made his first start for RB Leipzig on 6 February 2015, in a 2–2 draw against Erzgebirge Aue. Towards the end of the 2014–15 season, Klostermann was given a handful of first team appearances following the club's defensive crisis. He then scored his first goal for the club on 24 April 2015, in a 2–1 win over Darmstadt 98. At the end of the 2014–15 season, Klostermann went on to make a total of 15 appearances and scoring once in all competitions.

In the 2015–16 season, Klostermann started the season, playing in the right–back position for the side and soon became the club's first choice throughout the season. He set up a goal for Davie Selke, in a 2–2 draw against Greuther Fürth on Matchday 2. He then scored his first goal of the season, in a 2–1 win over 1860 Munich on 13 March 2016. Klostermann later helped the club get promoted to the Bundesliga for the first time after beating Karlsruher SC 2–0 on 8 May 2016. Despite missing out three matches, due to injuries later in the 2015–16 season, Klostermann went on to make a total of 31 appearances and scoring once in all competitions.

Ahead of the 2016–17 season, Klosterman was linked with a move away from RB Leipzig, as Premier League duo Tottenham Hotspur and Arsenal showed interest. However, his season was overshadowed with injuries. He only made one appearance across the whole season, starting the whole game, in a 1–0 win over Borussia Dortmund on Matchday 2. While rehabilitating his injuries, Klostermann signed a contract extension with the club, keeping him until 2021. It wasn't until May 2017 when he returned to training with the first team fully recovered.

The 2017–18 season saw Klostermann regaining his first team place at RB Leipzig, playing in the right–back position. Despite his absence at the start of the season, he scored his first goal for the club, in a 2–1 win over 1. FC Köln on 1 October 2017. In the second half of the 2017–18 season, Klostermann lost his place in the right–back position to Konrad Laimer. Instead, he began to play in the left–back position for the rest of the 2017–18 season, although he occasionally played in the right–back position. At the end of the 2017–18 season, Klostermann went on to make thirty–nine appearances in all competitions.

Ahead of the 2018–19 season, Klostermann was linked with a move to Serie A side A.S. Roma but dismissed the move and wanted to stay at the club. However, at the start of the 2018–19 season, he was sidelined, due to being on the substitute bench and suffered a knee injury. After returning from a knee injury, Klostermann regained his first team place in the right–back position despite facing strong competitions in the same position. It wasn't until on 11 November 2018 when he scored his first goal of the season and set up one of the goals, in a 3–0 win over Bayer Leverkusen. During the match, Klostermann made his 100th appearance for the side.

His second goal of the season came a month later on 22 December 2018, in a 3–2 win over Werder Bremen. After suffering a hamstring injury while on international duty, Klostermann returned from injury, starting the whole game, in a 4–2 win over Bayer Leverkusen on 6 April 2019. Then on 3 May 2019, he scored twice for the side, adding his tally to five goals this season, in a 3–3 draw against 1. FSV Mainz 05. Klostermann helped the club reach their first DFB-Pokal Final after beating Hamburger SV 3–1. In the final against Bayern Munich, he started the whole game, as RB Leipzig lost 3–0. At the end of the 2018–19 season, Klostermann went on to make forty appearances and scoring five times in all competitions. On 11 January 2024, Klostermann extended his contract with RB Leipzig until 2028.

== International career ==
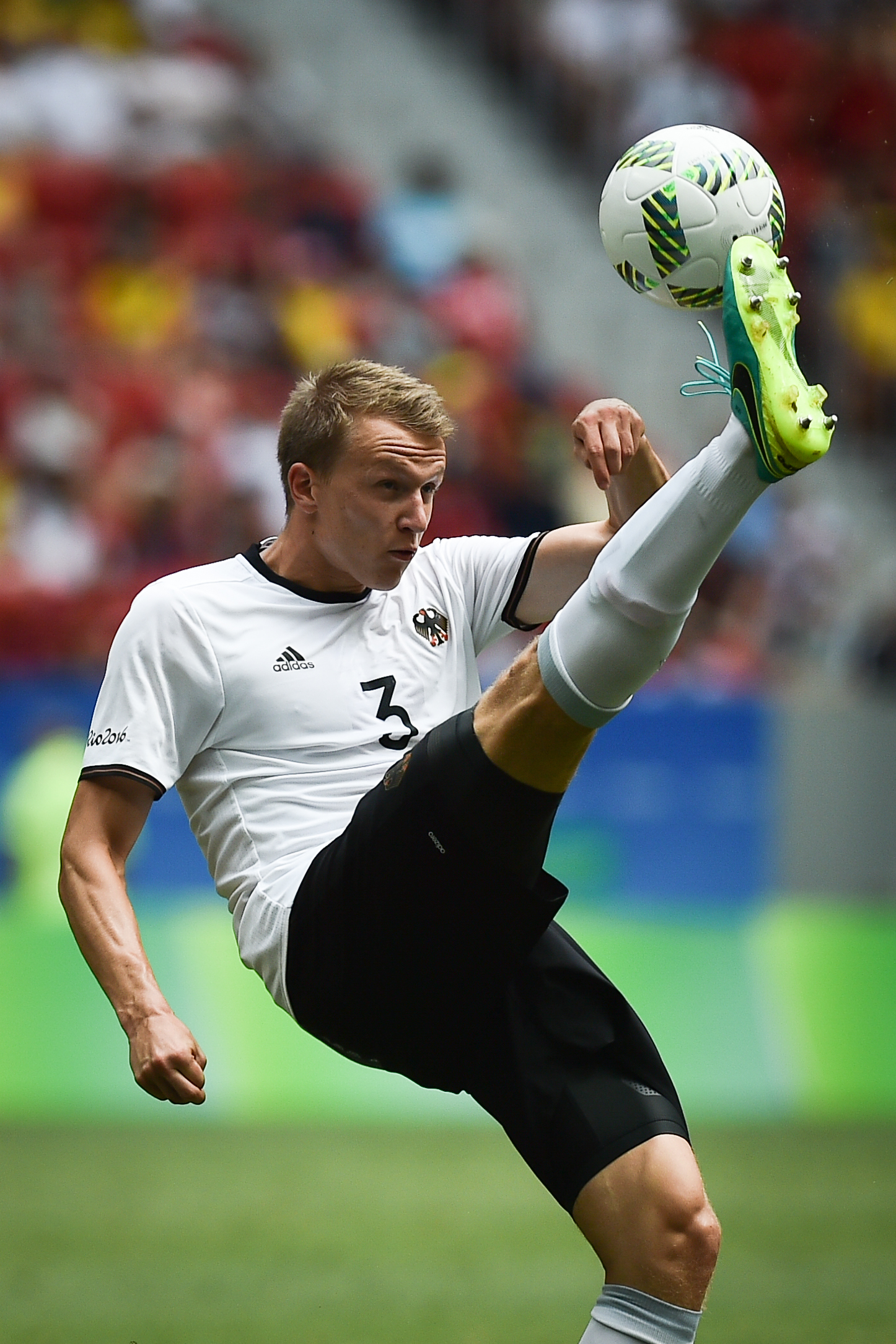
Klostermann playing for the Germany Olympic at the 2016 Summer Olympics

=== Youth career ===
Having previously represented the Germany youth team, Klostermann was called up by Germany U17 in February 2013. He made his Germany U17 debut, where he played 40 minutes after coming on as a substitute, in a 3–1 win over Netherlands U17 on 10 February 2013. He went on to make 6 appearances for the Germany U17 side.

A year later in September 2014, he was called up to the Germany U19 team. He made his Germany U19 debut, starting the whole game, in a 3–2 win over Netherlands U19 on 5 September 2014. However, during a 1–1 draw against England U19 on 8 September 2014, Klostermann suffered a concussion and had to be substituted. He then captained Germany U19 for the first time on 28 March 2015, in a 3–2 win over Republic of Ireland U19. Klostermann was later called up for the Germany U19 squad again for the UEFA European Under-19 Championship in June 2015. He went on to make three appearances in the tournament, as Germany U19 were eliminated in the Group Stage. After the tournament, he went on to make 11 appearances for the U19 side.

In August 2015, Klostermann was called up for the Germany U21 for the first time. He made his Germany U21 debut, coming on as a late substitute, in a 2–1 win over Denmark U21 on 3 September 2015. Almost a year absent, Klostermann was called up for the Germany U21 squad again and played 45 minutes, in a 2–1 loss against Hungary on 1 September 2017 Two months later, he scored two goals in two matches against Azerbaijan U21 and Israel U21.

On 27 March 2018, Klostermann captained the U21 side for the first time, starting the whole game, in 0–0 draw against Kosovo U21. He went on to captain the side on three more occasions by the end of 2018.

In June 2019, he was called up by Germany U21 for the UEFA European Under-21 Championship in Italy. Klostermann started all four matches and helped Germany U21 side reach the final. But in the final, he started the whole game, as Germany U21 lost 2–1 against Spain U21. Despite this, Klostermann were among six Germany U21 players to be named UEFA European Under-21 Championship Team of the Tournament.

=== 2016 Summer Olympics ===
In July 2016, Klostermann was called up to be a part of the squad for the 2016 Summer Olympics. Klostermann played his first match of the tournament on 4 August 2016, starting the whole game, in a 2–2 draw against Mexico U23. He then set up one of the goals, one of which was for Nils Petersen, who scored five goals, in a 10–0 win over Fiji U23 on 10 August 2016. He then scored his first goal of the tournament on 17 August 2016, in a 2–0 win over Nigeria U23 in the semi–finals, which sends them through to the final.

Although Germany U23 lost in the final against Brazil U23, He went on to make six appearances for the side, playing in the left–back position, where Germany won the silver medal. After the tournament, Klostermann revealed that he auctioned his silver medal, alongside Alexandra Popp. Later in November, the team were honoured with Silbernes Lorbeerblatt.

=== Senior team ===
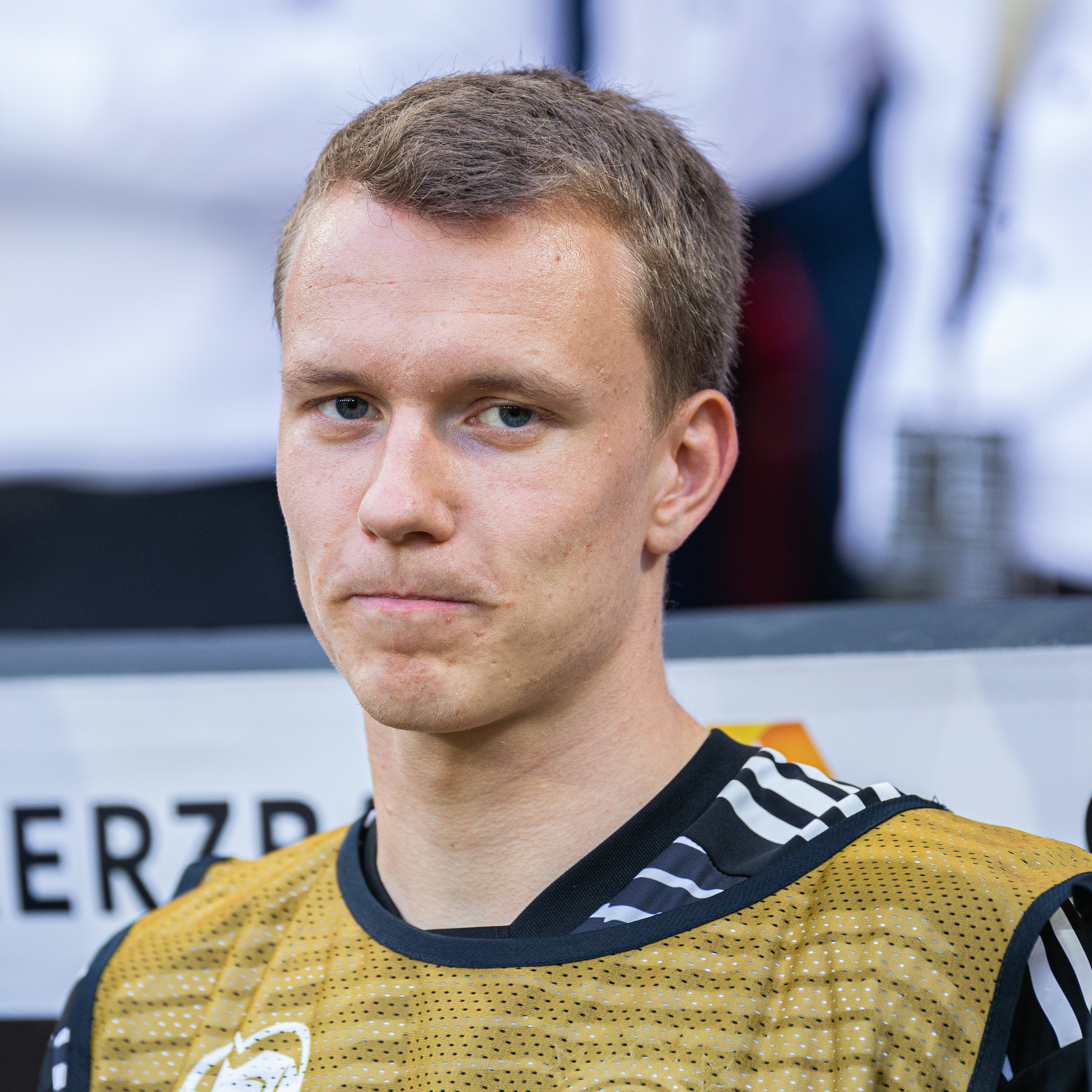
Klostermann with Germany in 2019

Klostermann received his first call-up to the senior national team in March 2019 for the friendly match against Serbia and UEFA Euro 2020 qualifying match against the Netherlands. On 20 March 2019, he debuted with a 1–1 draw against the former opponent, playing the full match. On 19 May 2021, Klostermann was selected to the squad for the UEFA Euro 2020.

== Personal life ==
Klostermann's parents were both athletes: his father ran 110m hurdles and his mother ran all-round. His sister, Lisa, is a former footballer who played as a goalkeeper. He attended a school in Gevelsberg to get his high school diploma and graduated in May 2014. Klostermann attended the University of Hagen, studying economics. Off the field, Klostermann maintains a private persona, preferring to focus on his career rather than seeking media attention.

== Career statistics ==
=== Club ===
As of match played 17 October 2026

Appearances and goals by club, season and competition
Club	Season	League			DFB-Pokal		Europe		Other		Total	
Club	Season	Division	Apps	Goals	Apps	Goals	Apps	Goals	Apps	Goals	Apps	Goals
VfL Bochum II	2013–14	Regionalliga West	2	0	—		—		—		2	0
VfL Bochum	2013–14	2. Bundesliga	9	0	0	0	—		—		9	0
RB Leipzig II	2014–15	NOFV-Oberliga Süd	2	1	—		—		—		2	1
RB Leipzig	2014–15	2. Bundesliga	13	1	2	0	—		—		15	1
RB Leipzig	2015–16	2. Bundesliga	30	1	1	0	—		—		31	1
RB Leipzig	2016–17	Bundesliga	1	0	0	0	—		—		1	0
RB Leipzig	2017–18	Bundesliga	26	1	2	0	11 (Note: Six appearances in UEFA Champions League, five appearances in UEFA Europa League)	0	—		39	1
RB Leipzig	2018–19	Bundesliga	26	5	5	0	9 (Note: Appearance(s) in UEFA Europa League)	0	—		40	5
RB Leipzig	2019–20	Bundesliga	31	3	2	1	10 (Note: Appearance(s) in UEFA Champions League)	0	—		43	4
RB Leipzig	2020–21	Bundesliga	23	1	4	0	2	0	—		29	1
RB Leipzig	2021–22	Bundesliga	23	0	3	0	11 (Note: Five appearances in UEFA Champions League, six appearances in UEFA Europa League)	0	—		37	0
RB Leipzig	2022–23	Bundesliga	15	0	4	0	2	0	1 (Note: Appearance in DFL-Supercup)	0	22	0
RB Leipzig	2023–24	Bundesliga	25	1	2	0	6	0	1	0	34	1
RB Leipzig	2024–25	Bundesliga	28	1	4	0	3	0	—		35	1
RB Leipzig	2025–26	Bundesliga	5	0	2	0	—		—		7	0
RB Leipzig	2026–27	Bundesliga	1	0	0	0	1	0	—		2	0
RB Leipzig	Total		247	14	31	1	55	0	2	0	335	15
Career total			260	15	31	1	55	0	2	0	348	16

=== International ===
Appearances and goals by national team and year
National team	Year	Apps	Goals
Germany	2019	8	0
Germany	2020	2	0
Germany	2021	6	0
Germany	2022	5	0
Germany	2023	1	0
Total		22	0

== Honours ==
RB Leipzig

- DFB-Pokal: 2021–22, 2022–23, runner up: 2020–21
- DFL-Supercup: 2023

Germany U21

- UEFA European Under-21 Championship runner-up: 2019

Germany U23

- Summer Olympic Games Silver Medal: 2016

Individual

- Fritz Walter Medal U19 Bronze: 2015
