= 2020–21 RB Leipzig season =

RB Leipzig
2020–21 season
- Owner: Red Bull GmbH
- Chairman: Oliver Mintzlaff
- Head coach: Julian Nagelsmann
- Stadium: Red Bull Arena
- Bundesliga: 2nd
- DFB-Pokal: Runners-up
- UEFA Champions League: Round of 16
- Top goalscorer: League: Marcel Sabitzer (8); All: Yussuf Poulsen (11)
Home colours	Away colours	Third colours

The 2020–21 season was the 12th season in the existence of RB Leipzig and the club's fifth consecutive season in the top flight of German football. In addition to the domestic league, RB Leipzig participated in this season's edition of the DFB-Pokal and in the UEFA Champions League. The season covered the period from 19 August 2020 to 30 June 2021.

== Players ==
=== First-team squad ===
As of 2 February 2021

Note: Flags indicate national team as defined under FIFA eligibility rules; some limited exceptions apply. Players may hold more than one non-FIFA nationality.

No.	Pos.	Nation	Player
1	GK	HUN	Péter Gulácsi (vice-captain)
3	DF	ESP	Angeliño
4	DF	HUN	Willi Orbán (3rd captain)
5	DF	FRA	Dayot Upamecano
6	DF	FRA	Ibrahima Konaté
7	MF	AUT	Marcel Sabitzer (captain)
8	MF	MLI	Amadou Haidara
9	FW	DEN	Yussuf Poulsen (4th captain)
10	MF	SWE	Emil Forsberg
11	FW	KOR	Hwang Hee-chan
13	GK	GER	Philipp Tschauner
14	MF	USA	Tyler Adams
16	DF	GER	Lukas Klostermann
17	MF	HUN	Dominik Szoboszlai

No.	Pos.	Nation	Player
18	MF	FRA	Christopher Nkunku
19	FW	NOR	Alexander Sørloth
20	MF	GER	Lazar Samardžić
21	FW	NED	Justin Kluivert (on loan from Roma)
22	DF	FRA	Nordi Mukiele
23	DF	GER	Marcel Halstenberg
25	MF	ESP	Dani Olmo
27	MF	AUT	Konrad Laimer
33	GK	ESP	Josep Martínez
35	FW	GER	Fabrice Hartmann
38	FW	ESP	Hugo Novoa
39	DF	GER	Benjamin Henrichs (on loan from Monaco)
44	MF	SLO	Kevin Kampl
47	MF	GER	Joscha Wosz

=== Players out on loan ===
Note: Flags indicate national team as defined under FIFA eligibility rules; some limited exceptions apply. Players may hold more than one non-FIFA nationality.

No.	Pos.	Nation	Player
—	GK	GER	Tim Schreiber (at Hallescher FC until 30 June 2022)
—	DF	URU	Marcelo Saracchi (at Galatasaray until 30 June 2021)
—	DF	GER	Frederik Jäkel (at Oostende until 30 June 2022)
—	MF	GER	Tom Krauß (at FC Nürnberg until 30 June 2022)
—	FW	ENG	Ademola Lookman (at Fulham until 30 June 2021)
—	DF	GER	Eric Martel (at Austria Vienna until 30 June 2022)

No.	Pos.	Nation	Player
—	FW	GER	Dennis Borkowski (at FC Nürnberg until 30 June 2022)
—	MF	AUT	Hannes Wolf (at Borussia Mönchengladbach until 30 June 2021)
—	DF	BRA	Luan Cândido (at Red Bull Bragantino until 30 June 2021)
—	GK	SUI	Yvon Mvogo (at PSV until 30 June 2022)
—	DF	CRO	Joško Gvardiol (at Dinamo Zagreb until 30 June 2021)

== Transfers ==
=== In ===
No.	Pos	Player	Transferred from	Fee	Date	Source
33	GK	(Spain) Josep Martínez	(Spain) Las Palmas	€2,500,000	End of season	
29	FW	(France) Jean-Kévin Augustin	(England) Leeds United	Loan return	1 July 2020	
11	FW	(South Korea) Hwang Hee-chan	(Austria) Red Bull Salzburg	€9,000,000	8 July 2020	
39	DF	(Germany) Benjamin Henrichs	(France) Monaco	Loan	8 July 2020	
20	MF	(Germany) Lazar Samardžić	(Germany) Hertha BSC	€1,000,000	8 September 2020	
3	DF	(Spain) Angeliño	(England) Manchester City	Loan	8 September 2020	
19	FW	(Norway) Alexander Sørloth	(England) Crystal Palace	€20,000,000	22 September 2020	
—	DF	(Croatia) Joško Gvardiol	(Croatia) Dinamo Zagreb	€16,000,000	28 September 2020	
21	FW	(Netherlands) Justin Kluivert	(Italy) Roma	Loan	5 October 2020	
17	MF	(Hungary) Dominik Szoboszlai	(Austria) Red Bull Salzburg	€20,000,000	17 December 2020	
3	DF	(Spain) Angeliño	(England) Manchester City	€18,000,000	12 February 2021	

=== Out ===
No.	Pos	Player	Transferred to	Fee	Date	Source
3	DF	(Spain) Angeliño	(England) Manchester City	Loan return	End of season	
11	FW	(Germany) Timo Werner	(England) Chelsea	€50,000,000	1 July 2020	
21	FW	(Czech Republic) Patrik Schick	(Italy) Roma	Loan return	End of season	
26	DF	(Wales) Ethan Ampadu	(England) Chelsea	Loan return	End of season	
19	MF	(Austria) Hannes Wolf	(Germany) Borussia Mönchengladbach	Loan	21 July 2020	
28	GK	(Switzerland) Yvon Mvogo	(Netherlands) PSV Eindhoven	Loan	25 August 2020	
—	DF	(Croatia) Joško Gvardiol	(Croatia) Dinamo Zagreb	Loan	28 September 2020	
17	FW	(England) Ademola Lookman	(England) Fulham	Loan	30 September 2020	
29	FW	(France) Jean-Kévin Augustin	(France) Nantes	Free	6 October 2020	
45	DF	(Germany) Eric Martel	Austria Wien	Loan	15 January 2021	
41	FW	(Germany) Dennis Borkowski	(Germany) 1. FC Nürnberg	Loan	29 January 2021	
32	GK	(Germany) Tim Schreiber	(Germany) Hallescher FC	Loan	1 February 2021	

== Kits ==
Home	Home alt.	Home alt. 2	Home alt. 3	Home 2021–22	Away	Away 2021–22	Third	Fourth

== Competitions ==
=== Overview ===
Competition	First match	Last match	Starting round	Final position	Record							
Competition	First match	Last match	Starting round	Final position	Pld	W	D	L	GF	GA	GD	Win %
Bundesliga	20 September 2020	22 May 2021	Matchday 1	2nd	34	19	8	7	60	32	+28	55.88
DFB-Pokal	12 September 2020	13 May 2021	First round	Runners-up	6	5	0	1	15	5	+10	83.33
UEFA Champions League	20 October 2020	10 March 2021	Group stage	Round of 16	8	4	0	4	11	16	−5	50.00
Total					48	28	8	12	86	53	+33	58.33

Last updated: 22 May 2021
Source: Soccerway

=== Bundesliga ===
==== League table ====
Pos	Team	Pld	W	D	L	GF	GA	GD	Pts	Qualification or relegation
1	Bayern Munich (C)	34	24	6	4	99	44	+55	78	Qualification for the Champions League group stage
2	RB Leipzig	34	19	8	7	60	32	+28	65	Qualification for the Champions League group stage
3	Borussia Dortmund	34	20	4	10	75	46	+29	64	Qualification for the Champions League group stage
4	VfL Wolfsburg	34	17	10	7	61	37	+24	61	Qualification for the Champions League group stage
5	Eintracht Frankfurt	34	16	12	6	69	53	+16	60	Qualification for the Europa League group stage (Note: Since the winners of the 2020–21 DFB-Pokal, Borussia Dortmund, qualified for the Champions League based on league position, the Europa League group stage spot was passed to the sixth-placed team, and the Europa Conference League play-off round spot was passed to the seventh-placed team.)

Source: DFB
Rules for classification: 1) Points; 2) Goal difference; 3) Goals scored; 4) Head-to-head results; 5) Head-to-head away goals scored; 6) Away goals scored; 7) Play-off.
(C) Champions

==== Results summary ====
Overall								Home						Away					
Pld	W	D	L	GF	GA	GD	Pts	W	D	L	GF	GA	GD	W	D	L	GF	GA	GD
34	19	8	7	60	32	+28	65	11	4	2	29	13	+16	8	4	5	31	19	+12

Last updated: 22 May 2021.
Source: DFB

==== Results by round ====
Round	1	2	3	4	5	6	7	8	9	10	11	12	13	14	15	16	17	18	19	20	21	22	23	24	25	26	27	28	29	30	31	32	33	34
Ground	H	A	H	A	H	A	H	A	H	A	H	A	H	A	H	A	H	A	H	A	H	A	H	A	H	A	H	A	H	A	H	A	H	A
Result	W	D	W	W	W	L	W	D	W	D	W	W	D	W	L	D	W	L	W	W	W	W	W	W	D	W	L	W	D	L	W	L	D	L
Position	4	3	1	1	1	3	2	4	2	3	3	3	3	2	2	2	2	2	2	2	2	2	2	2	2	2	2	2	2	2	2	2	2	2

Updated to match(es) played on 22 May 2021. Source: DFB
A = Away; H = Home; W = Win; D = Draw; L = Loss

==== Matches ====
The league fixtures were announced on 7 August 2020.

20 September 2020 1	RB Leipzig	3–1	Mainz 05	Leipzig
15:30 CEST (UTC+2)	Forsberg 17' (pen.); Poulsen 21', (yellow card) 64'; Haidara 51'	Report	Mateta (yellow card) 30', (goal) 48'; Latza (yellow card) 58'	Stadium: Red Bull Arena; Attendance: 8,500; Referee: Manuel Gräfe

26 September 2020 2	Bayer Leverkusen	1–1	RB Leipzig	Leverkusen
15:30 CEST (UTC+2)	Demirbay (yellow card) 19', (goal) 20'	Report	Forsberg 14'; Klostermann (yellow card) 45'; Haidara (yellow card) 65'; Adams (yellow card) 90+2'	Stadium: BayArena; Attendance: 6,042; Referee: Harm Osmers

3 October 2020 3	RB Leipzig	4–0	Schalke 04	Leipzig
18:30 CEST (UTC+2)	Bozdogan 31' (o.g.); Angeliño 35'; Orbán 45+2'; Halstenberg 80' (pen.); Sørloth (yellow card) 84'	Report	Sané (yellow card) 64'; Nastasić (yellow card) 79'; Ibišević (yellow card) 90+2'	Stadium: Red Bull Arena; Attendance: 8,500; Referee: Florian Badstübner

17 October 2020 4	FC Augsburg	0–2	RB Leipzig	Augsburg
15:30 CEST (UTC+2)		Report	Angeliño 45'; Upamecano (yellow card) 60'; Poulsen 66'	Stadium: WWK Arena; Attendance: 0 Referee: Felix Brych

24 October 2020 5	RB Leipzig	2–1	Hertha BSC	Leipzig
15:30 CEST (UTC+2)	Upamecano 11', (yellow card) 49'; Sabitzer 77' (pen.)	Report	Córdoba 8'; Tousart (yellow card) 17'; Zeefuik (yellow card) 47' (yellow-red card) 50'; Ngankam (yellow card) 90+2'	Stadium: Red Bull Arena; Attendance: 999; Referee: Tobias Stieler

31 October 2020 6	Borussia Mönchengladbach	1–0	RB Leipzig	Mönchengladbach
18:30 CET (UTC+1)	Wendt (yellow card) 52'; Neuhaus (yellow card) 56'; Wolf 60'	Report	Kampl (yellow card) 61'; Hwang (yellow card) 69'; Sabitzer (yellow card) 70'; Nkunku (yellow card) 90+4'	Stadium: Borussia-Park; Attendance: 0 Referee: Daniel Siebert

7 November 2020 7	RB Leipzig	3–0	SC Freiburg	Leipzig
15:30 CET (UTC+1)	Konaté 26'; Orbán (yellow card) 28'; Henrichs (yellow card) 62'; Sabitzer 70' (pen.); Angeliño 89'	Report	Lienhart (yellow card) 25'; Gulde (yellow card) 44'; Tempelmann (yellow card) 90+1'	Stadium: Red Bull Arena; Attendance: 0 Referee: Felix Zwayer

21 November 2020 8	Eintracht Frankfurt	1–1	RB Leipzig	Frankfurt
18:30 CET (UTC+1)	Barkok 43'; Durm (yellow card) 49'; Sow (yellow card) 60'; Abraham (yellow card) 83'	Report	Nkunku (yellow card) 9'; Olmo (yellow card) 45'; Poulsen 57'	Stadium: Deutsche Bank Park; Attendance: 0 Referee: Sören Storks

28 November 2020 9	RB Leipzig	2–1	Arminia Bielefeld	Leipzig
15:30 CET (UTC+1)	Angeliño 29'; Nkunku 47'; Sørloth (penalty missed) 73'; Orbán (yellow card) 85'; Kampl (yellow card) 90+1'	Report	Van der Hoorn (yellow card) 38'; Klos 75'; Lucoqui (yellow card) 77'	Stadium: Red Bull Arena; Attendance: 0 Referee: Robert Hartmann

5 December 2020 10	Bayern Munich	3–3	RB Leipzig	Munich
18:30 CET (UTC+1)	Musiala 30'; Müller 34', 75'	Report	Nkunku 19'; Kluivert 36'; Forsberg 48'; Mukiele (yellow card) 51'	Stadium: Allianz Arena; Attendance: 0 Referee: Daniel Siebert

12 December 2020 11	RB Leipzig	2–0	Werder Bremen	Leipzig
15:30 CET (UTC+1)	Sabitzer 26' (pen.); Olmo 41'; Kampl (yellow card) 44'; Mukiele (yellow card) 47'; Upamecano (yellow card) 78'	Report	Augustinsson (yellow card) 25'	Stadium: Red Bull Arena; Attendance: 0 Referee: Sören Storks

16 December 2020 12	1899 Hoffenheim	0–1	RB Leipzig	Sinsheim
20:30 CET (UTC+1)	Vogt (yellow card) 50'; Sessegnon (yellow card) 56'	Report	Poulsen 60'	Stadium: Rhein-Neckar-Arena; Attendance: 0 Referee: Daniel Schlager

19 December 2020 13	RB Leipzig	0–0	1. FC Köln	Leipzig
15:30 CET (UTC+1)	Halstenberg (yellow card) 84'	Report		Stadium: Red Bull Arena; Attendance: 0 Referee: Felix Brych

2 January 2021 14	VfB Stuttgart	0–1	RB Leipzig	Stuttgart
20:30 CET (UTC+1)	Stenzel (yellow card) 21'; Sosa (yellow card) 49'	Report	Forsberg (penalty missed) 22'; Sabitzer (yellow card) 42'; Olmo 67'	Stadium: Mercedes-Benz Arena; Attendance: 0 Referee: Christian Dingert

9 January 2021 15	RB Leipzig	1–3	Borussia Dortmund	Leipzig
18:30 CET (UTC+1)	Sørloth 90'	Report	Delaney (yellow card) 32'; Sancho 55'; Haaland 71', 84'; Akanji (yellow card) 73'	Stadium: Red Bull Arena; Attendance: 0 Referee: Daniel Siebert

16 January 2021 16	VfL Wolfsburg	2–2	RB Leipzig	Wolfsburg
15:30 CET (UTC+1)	Weghorst 22', (yellow card) 59'; Steffen 35'; Paulo Otávio (yellow card) 48'; Mbabu (yellow card) 50'; Lacroix (yellow card) 81'	Report	Mukiele 5', (yellow card) 42'; Orbán 54'; Kampl (yellow card) 71'; Angeliño (yellow card) 90+1'	Stadium: Volkswagen Arena; Attendance: 0 Referee: Tobias Stieler

20 January 2021 17	RB Leipzig	1–0	Union Berlin	Leipzig
20:30 CET (UTC+1)	Angeliño (yellow card) 66'; Forsberg 70'	Report	Gießelmann (yellow card) 89'	Stadium: Red Bull Arena; Attendance: 0 Referee: Markus Schmidt

23 January 2021 18	Mainz 05	3–2	RB Leipzig	Mainz
15:30 CET (UTC+1)	Niakhaté 24', 35', (yellow card) 40'; Barreiro 50'; Da Costa (yellow card) 75'	Report	Adams 15', (yellow card) 70'; Halstenberg (yellow card) 23', (goal) 30'; Orbán (yellow card) 88'; Sørloth (yellow card) 90+2'	Stadium: Opel Arena; Attendance: 0 Referee: Christian Dingert

30 January 2021 19	RB Leipzig	1–0	Bayer Leverkusen	Leipzig
18:30 CET (UTC+1)	Nkunku 51'; Kluivert (yellow card) 90'; Haidara (yellow card) 90+2'	Report	Bellarabi (yellow card) 60'; Bailey (yellow card) 75'	Stadium: Red Bull Arena; Attendance: 0 Referee: Harm Osmers

6 February 2021 20	Schalke 04	0–3	RB Leipzig	Gelsenkirchen
15:30 CET (UTC+1)	Mascarell (yellow card) 27'; Kolašinac (yellow card) 69'	Report	Mukiele 45+3'; Sabitzer 73', (yellow card) 82'; Orbán 87'	Stadium: Veltins-Arena; Attendance: 0 Referee: Martin Petersen

12 February 2021 21	RB Leipzig	2–1	FC Augsburg	Leipzig
20:30 CET (UTC+1)	Olmo 38' (pen.); Klostermann (yellow card) 41'; Nkunku 43'; Orbán (yellow card) 62'; Adams (yellow card) 72'	Report	Oxford (yellow card) 3'; Gouweleeuw (yellow card) 22'; Suchý (yellow card) 28'; Gikiewicz (yellow card) 34'; Bénes (yellow card) 63'; Caligiuri 77' (pen.)	Stadium: Red Bull Arena; Attendance: 0 Referee: Felix Zwayer

21 February 2021 22	Hertha BSC	0–3	RB Leipzig	Berlin
15:30 CET (UTC+1)	Cunha (yellow card) 34'	Report	Sabitzer 28', (yellow card) 45'; Mukiele 71'; Orbán 84'	Stadium: Olympiastadion; Attendance: 0 Referee: Sven Jablonski

27 February 2021 23	RB Leipzig	3–2	Borussia Mönchengladbach	Leipzig
18:30 CET (UTC+1)	Sabitzer (yellow card) 41'; Upamecano (yellow card) 43'; Nkunku 57'; Poulsen 66'; Sørloth 90+3'	Report	Hofmann 6' (pen.); Thuram 19'; Elvedi (yellow card) 49'; Stindl (yellow card) 90+3'	Stadium: Red Bull Arena; Attendance: 0 Referee: Manuel Gräfe

6 March 2021 24	SC Freiburg	0–3	RB Leipzig	Freiburg
15:30 CET (UTC+1)	Höfler (yellow card) 52'	Report	Nkunku 41'; Sørloth 64'; Hwang (yellow card) 75'; Forsberg 79'	Stadium: Schwarzwald-Stadion; Attendance: 0 Referee: Guido Winkmann

14 March 2021 25	RB Leipzig	1–1	Eintracht Frankfurt	Leipzig
15:30 CET (UTC+1)	Kluivert (yellow card) 44'; Forsberg 47'; Mukiele (yellow card) 90+3'	Report	Younes (yellow card) 15'; Ndicka (yellow card) 49'; Kamada 61'; Tuta (yellow card) 69'	Stadium: Red Bull Arena; Attendance: 0 Referee: Felix Zwayer

19 March 2021 26	Arminia Bielefeld	0–1	RB Leipzig	Bielefeld
20:30 CET (UTC+1)	Pieper (yellow card) 71'; Brunner (yellow card) 83'	Report	Sabitzer 46'; Kampl (yellow card) 85'	Stadium: Bielefelder Alm; Attendance: 0 Referee: Frank Willenborg

3 April 2021 27	RB Leipzig	0–1	Bayern Munich	Leipzig
18:30 CEST (UTC+2)	Mukiele (yellow card) 26'; Sabitzer (yellow card) 37'; Upamecano (yellow card) 61'	Report	Kimmich (yellow card) 33'; Goretzka 38'; Hernandez (yellow card) 81'	Stadium: Red Bull Arena; Attendance: 0 Referee: Daniel Siebert

10 April 2021 28	Werder Bremen	1–4	RB Leipzig	Bremen
15:30 CEST (UTC+2)	Rashica 61' (pen.)	Report	Olmo 23'; Sørloth 32', 41'; Sabitzer 63'	Stadium: Weser-Stadion; Attendance: 0 Referee: Florian Badstübner

16 April 2021 29	RB Leipzig	0–0	1899 Hoffenheim	Leipzig
20:30 CEST (UTC+2)		Report	Posch (yellow card) 46'; Baumgartner (yellow card) 79'	Stadium: Red Bull Arena; Attendance: 0 Referee: Manuel Gräfe

20 April 2021 30	1. FC Köln	2–1	RB Leipzig	Cologne
18:30 CEST (UTC+2)	Ehizibue (yellow card) 23'; Hector 46', 60'; Czichos (yellow card) 90+6'	Report	Upamecano (yellow card) 56'; Haidara 59', (yellow card) 90+6'; Kampl (yellow card) 83'	Stadium: RheinEnergieStadion; Attendance: 0 Referee: Frank Willenborg

25 April 2021 31	RB Leipzig	2–0	VfB Stuttgart	Leipzig
15:30 CEST (UTC+2)	Konaté (yellow card) 24'; Haidara 46'; Forsberg 67' (pen.); Henrichs (yellow card) 76'	Report	Ahamada (red card) 14'	Stadium: Red Bull Arena; Attendance: 0 Referee: Deniz Aytekin

8 May 2021 32	Borussia Dortmund	3–2	RB Leipzig	Dortmund
15:30 CEST (UTC+2)	Reus 7'; Sancho 51', 87'; Hummels (yellow card) 74'	Report	Klostermann 63'; Olmo 77'; Haidara (yellow card) 90+1'	Stadium: Signal Iduna Park; Attendance: 0 Referee: Daniel Siebert

16 May 2021 33	RB Leipzig	2–2	VfL Wolfsburg	Leipzig
20:30 CEST (UTC+2)	Henrichs (yellow card) 20'; Konaté (yellow card) 36'; Sabitzer (yellow card) 45', (goal) 78' (pen.); Kluivert 51'	Report	Philipp 12', 45+1'; Mbabu (yellow card) 52'; Arnold (yellow card) 60'; Baku (yellow card) 86'	Stadium: Red Bull Arena; Attendance: 0 Referee: Felix Zwayer

22 May 2021 34	Union Berlin	2–1	RB Leipzig	Berlin
15:30 CEST (UTC+2)	Trimmel (yellow card) 53'; Friedrich 67'; Schlotterbeck (yellow card) 76'; Kruse 90+2'	Report	Sabitzer (yellow card) 25'; Kluivert 55'	Stadium: Stadion An der Alten Försterei; Attendance: 2,000; Referee: Guido Winkmann

=== DFB-Pokal ===
12 September 2020 First round	1. FC Nürnberg	0–3	RB Leipzig	Nuremberg
15:30 CEST (UTC+2)	Valentini (yellow card) 43'; Geis (yellow card) 56'	Report	Haidara 3'; Halstenberg (yellow card) 58'; Poulsen 67'; Hwang 90'	Stadium: Max-Morlock-Stadion; Attendance: 0 Referee: Marco Fritz

22 December 2020 Second round	FC Augsburg	0–3	RB Leipzig	Augsburg
18:30 CET (UTC+1)	Iago (yellow card) 8'	Report	Orbán 11'; Mukiele (yellow card) 73'; Poulsen 75'; Angeliño 82'	Stadium: WWK Arena; Attendance: 0 Referee: Sascha Stegemann

3 February 2021 Round of 16	RB Leipzig	4–0	VfL Bochum	Leipzig
18:30 CET (UTC+1)	Haidara 11'; Sabitzer 45+1' (pen.); Angeliño (yellow card) 60'; Poulsen 66', 75'; Hwang (yellow card) 88'	Report	Mašović (yellow card) 24'; Drewes (yellow card) 45+1'; Soares (yellow card) 63'; Chibsah (yellow card) 87'	Stadium: Red Bull Arena; Attendance: 0 Referee: Bastian Dankert

3 March 2021 Quarter-finals	RB Leipzig	2–0	VfL Wolfsburg	Leipzig
20:45 CET (UTC+1)	Kampl (yellow card) 20'; Olmo (yellow card) 21'; Nkunku (yellow card) 25'; Poulsen 63'; Hwang 88'	Report	Paulo Otávio (yellow card) 5'; Weghorst (penalty missed) 26'; Lacroix (yellow card) 35'	Stadium: Red Bull Arena; Attendance: 0 Referee: Marco Fritz

30 April 2021 (Note: The Werder Bremen v RB Leipzig match, originally scheduled on 2 May 2021, 20:30, was rescheduled to 30 April 2021 for undisclosed reasons.) Semi-finals	Werder Bremen	1–2 (a.e.t.)	RB Leipzig	Bremen
20:30 CEST (UTC+2)	Bittencourt 105+1'	Report	Haidara (yellow card) 35'; Hwang 93'; Kampl (yellow card) 99'; Gulácsi (yellow card) 101'; Forsberg 120+1'	Stadium: Weser-Stadion; Attendance: 0 Referee: Manuel Gräfe

13 May 2021 Final	RB Leipzig	1–4	Borussia Dortmund	Berlin
20:45 CEST (UTC+2)	Upamecano (yellow card) 45+1'; Olmo 71', (yellow card) 81'	Report	Sancho 5', 45+1', (yellow card) 81'; Can (yellow card) 15'; Bellingham (yellow card) 25'; Haaland 28', 87'; Dahoud (yellow card) 50'; Hummels (yellow card) 90'	Stadium: Olympiastadion; Attendance: 0 Referee: Felix Brych

=== UEFA Champions League ===
==== Group stage ====
The group stage draw was held on 1 October 2020.

Pos	Team	Pld	W	D	L	GF	GA	GD	Pts	Qualification	PAR	RBL	MUN	IBS
1	(France) Paris Saint-Germain	6	4	0	2	13	6	+7	12 (Note: Tied on head-to-head points (3). Head-to-head away goals: Paris Saint-Germain 1, RB Leipzig 0.)	Advance to knockout phase	—	1–0	1–2	5–1
2	(Germany) RB Leipzig	6	4	0	2	11	12	−1	12	Advance to knockout phase	2–1	—	3–2	2–0
3	(England) Manchester United	6	3	0	3	15	10	+5	9	Transfer to Europa League	1–3	5–0	—	4–1
4	(Turkey) İstanbul Başakşehir	6	1	0	5	7	18	−11	3		0–2	3–4	2–1	—

Source: UEFA
Rules for classification: Group stage tiebreakers
Notes:

20 October 2020 1	RB Leipzig (Germany)	2–0	(Turkey) İstanbul Başakşehir	Leipzig, Germany
21:00 CEST (UTC+2)	Angeliño 16', 20'; Nkunku (yellow card) 40'; Upamecano (yellow card) 41'; Konaté (yellow card) 73'; Henrichs (yellow card) 89'	Report	Bolingoli (yellow card) 18'; Rafael (yellow card) 43'; Özcan (yellow card) 86'	Stadium: Red Bull Arena; Attendance: 999; Referee: Jesús Gil Manzano (Spain)

28 October 2020 2	Manchester United (England)	5–0	(Germany) RB Leipzig	Manchester, England
21:00 CET (UTC+1)	Greenwood 21'; Matić (yellow card) 34'; Rashford 76', 78', 90+2'; Martial 86' (pen.)	Report	Henrichs (yellow card) 46'; Kluivert (yellow card) 77'; Sabitzer (yellow card) 86'	Stadium: Old Trafford; Attendance: 577; Referee: Matej Jug (Slovenia)

4 November 2020 3	RB Leipzig (Germany)	2–1	(France) Paris Saint-Germain	Leipzig, Germany
21:00 CET (UTC+1)	Upamecano (yellow card) 15'; Konaté (yellow card) 25'; Nkunku 42'; Forsberg 57' (pen.)	Report	Di María 6', (penalty missed) 16'; Kimpembe (yellow card) 19' (yellow-red card) 90+5'; Gueye (yellow card) 37' (yellow-red card) 69'; Kurzawa (yellow card) 68'	Stadium: Red Bull Arena; Attendance: 0 (Note: Due to the COVID-19 pandemic in Europe, the match was played behind closed doors.); Referee: Szymon Marciniak (Poland)

24 November 2020 4	Paris Saint-Germain (France)	1–0	(Germany) RB Leipzig	Paris, France
21:00 CET (UTC+1)	Neymar 11' (pen.), (yellow card) 40'; Paredes (yellow card) 41'; Rafinha (yellow card) 77'; Herrera (yellow card) 82'; Verratti (yellow card) 84'	Report	Forsberg (yellow card) 2'	Stadium: Parc de Princes; Attendance: 0 Referee: Danny Makkelie (Netherlands)

2 December 2020 5	İstanbul Başakşehir (Turkey)	3–4	(Germany) RB Leipzig	Istanbul, Turkey
18:55 CET (UTC+1)	Škrtel (yellow card) 38'; Kahveci 45+3', 72', 85'; Türüç (yellow card) 58'; Tekdemir (yellow card) 79'; Rafael (yellow card) 89'	Report	Poulsen 26'; Mukiele 43'; Upamecano (yellow card) 53'; Olmo 66', (yellow card) 67'; Sørloth 90+2'	Stadium: Fatih Terim Stadium; Attendance: 0 Referee: Carlos del Cerro Grande (Spain)

8 December 2020 6	RB Leipzig (Germany)	3–2	(England) Manchester United	Leipzig, Germany
21:00 CET (UTC+1)	Angeliño 2'; Haidara 13'; Mukiele (yellow card) 32'; Sabitzer (yellow card) 35'; Kluivert (yellow card) 62', (goal) 69'; Adams (yellow card) 81'	Report	Fernandes (yellow card) 5', (goal) 80' (pen.); Shaw (yellow card) 43'; Maguire (yellow card) 63'; Williams (yellow card) 68'; Lindelöf (yellow card) 77'; Konaté 82' (o.g.)	Stadium: Red Bull Arena; Attendance: 0 Referee: Antonio Mateu Lahoz (Spain)

==== Knockout phase ====
===== Round of 16 =====
The draw for the round of 16 was held on 14 December 2020.

16 February 2021 First leg	RB Leipzig (Germany)	0–2	(England) Liverpool	Budapest, Hungary
21:00 CET (UTC+1)	Haidara (yellow card) 5'; Mukiele (yellow card) 5'; Nkunku (yellow card) 52'; Angeliño (yellow card) 65'; Olmo (yellow card) 76'	Report	Salah 53'; Mané 58'; Kabak (yellow card) 69'; Henderson (yellow card) 81'	Stadium: Puskás Aréna; Attendance: 0 Referee: Slavko Vinčić (Slovenia)
Note: The match, originally to be played at Red Bull Arena in Leipzig, was moved to Puskás Aréna in Budapest, due to restrictions imposed by Germany on travelers from the United Kingdom out of concern of the COVID-19 variant B.1.1.7.

10 March 2021 Second leg	Liverpool (England)	2–0 (4–0 agg.)	(Germany) RB Leipzig	Budapest, Hungary
20:00 GMT (UTC±0)	Salah 71'; Mané 74'	Report		Stadium: Puskás Aréna; Attendance: 0 Referee: Clément Turpin (France)
Note: The match, originally to be played at Anfield in Liverpool, was moved to Puskás Aréna in Budapest, due to travel restrictions related to the COVID-19 pandemic between Germany and the United Kingdom.

== Statistics ==
=== Appearances and goals ===
No.	Pos	Nat	Player	Total		Bundesliga		DFB-Pokal		Champions League	
No.	Pos	Nat	Player	Apps	Goals	Apps	Goals	Apps	Goals	Apps	Goals
Goalkeepers
1	GK	(Hungary) HUN	Péter Gulácsi	47	0	33	0	6	0	8	0
13	GK	(Germany) GER	Philipp Tschauner	0	0	0	0	0	0	0	0
33	GK	(Spain) ESP	Josep Martínez	1	0	1	0	0	0	0	0
Defenders
3	DF	(Spain) ESP	Angeliño	37	8	24+2	4	4	1	7	3
4	DF	(Hungary) HUN	Willi Orbán	40	5	25+4	4	4+1	1	3+3	0
5	DF	(France) FRA	Dayot Upamecano	41	1	27+2	1	5	0	7	0
6	DF	(France) FRA	Ibrahima Konaté	21	1	8+6	1	1	0	5+1	0
16	DF	(Germany) GER	Lukas Klostermann	29	1	15+8	1	4	0	2	0
22	DF	(France) FRA	Nordi Mukiele	40	4	21+7	3	4+1	0	7	1
23	DF	(Germany) GER	Marcel Halstenberg	31	2	19+5	2	4	0	2+1	0
39	DF	(Germany) GER	Benjamin Henrichs	20	0	5+8	0	0+4	0	1+2	0
Midfielders
7	MF	(Austria) AUT	Marcel Sabitzer	39	9	24+3	8	5	1	6+1	0
8	MF	(Mali) MLI	Amadou Haidara	43	6	21+10	3	5+1	2	5+1	1
14	MF	(United States) USA	Tyler Adams	37	1	21+6	1	3+1	0	2+4	0
17	MF	(Hungary) HUN	Dominik Szoboszlai	0	0	0	0	0	0	0	0
18	MF	(France) FRA	Christopher Nkunku	40	7	19+9	6	3+2	0	7	1
20	MF	(Germany) GER	Lazar Samardžić	10	0	3+5	0	1+1	0	0	0
25	MF	(Spain) ESP	Dani Olmo	46	7	26+6	5	5+1	1	8	1
27	MF	(Austria) AUT	Konrad Laimer	4	0	1+2	0	0+1	0	0	0
44	MF	(Slovenia) SLO	Kevin Kampl	39	0	24+3	0	4+1	0	6+1	0
47	MF	(Germany) GER	Joscha Wosz	3	0	0+2	0	0+1	0	0	0
Forwards
9	FW	(Denmark) DEN	Yussuf Poulsen	41	11	14+13	5	2+4	5	5+3	1
10	FW	(Sweden) SWE	Emil Forsberg	41	9	20+9	7	1+4	1	7	1
11	FW	(South Korea) KOR	Hwang Hee-chan	26	3	3+15	0	2+3	3	0+3	0
19	FW	(Norway) NOR	Alexander Sørloth	37	6	13+16	5	2+2	0	0+4	1
21	FW	(Netherlands) NED	Justin Kluivert	27	4	8+11	3	1	0	0+7	1
35	FW	(Germany) GER	Fabrice Hartmann	0	0	0	0	0	0	0	0
38	FW	(Spain) ESP	Hugo Novoa Ramos	0	0	0	0	0	0	0	0
Players transferred out during the season
17	FW	(England) ENG	Ademola Lookman	0	0	0	0	0	0	0	0
32	GK	(Germany) GER	Tim Schreiber	0	0	0	0	0	0	0	0
41	FW	(Germany) GER	Dennis Borkowski	3	0	0+2	0	0+1	0	0	0
45	DF	(Germany) GER	Eric Martel	1	0	0	0	0+1	0	0	0

Last updated: 22 May 2021
Source: Competitions

=== Goalscorers ===
As of 22 May 2021

Rank	No.	Pos.	Nat.	Name	Bundesliga	DFB-Pokal	Champions League	Total
1	9	FW	(Denmark)	Yussuf Poulsen	5	5	1	11
2	7	MF	(Austria)	Marcel Sabitzer	8	1	0	9
2	10	FW	(Sweden)	Emil Forsberg	7	1	1	9
4	3	DF	(Spain)	Angeliño	4	1	3	8
5	18	MF	(France)	Christopher Nkunku	6	0	1	7
5	25	MF	(Spain)	Dani Olmo	5	1	1	7
7	8	MF	(Mali)	Amadou Haidara	3	2	1	6
7	19	FW	(Norway)	Alexander Sørloth	5	0	1	6
9	4	DF	(Hungary)	Willi Orbán	4	1	0	5
10	21	FW	(Netherlands)	Justin Kluivert	3	0	1	4
10	22	DF	(France)	Nordi Mukiele	3	0	1	4
12	11	FW	(South Korea)	Hwang Hee-chan	0	3	0	3
13	23	DF	(Germany)	Marcel Halstenberg	2	0	0	2
14	5	DF	(France)	Dayot Upamecano	1	0	0	1
14	6	DF	(France)	Ibrahima Konaté	1	0	0	1
14	14	MF	(United States)	Tyler Adams	1	0	0	1
14	16	DF	(Germany)	Lukas Klostermann	1	0	0	1
Own goals					1	0	0	1
Totals					60	15	11	86
