= 2021 DFB-Pokal final =

- Match programme cover
- Event: 2020–21 DFB-Pokal
| RB Leipzig | Borussia Dortmund |
| 1 | 4 |
- Date: 13 May 2021
- Venue: Olympiastadion, Berlin
- Man of the Match: Marco Reus (Borussia Dortmund)
- Referee: Felix Brych (Munich)
- Attendance: 0 (Note: The final was played behind closed doors due to the COVID-19 pandemic in Germany.)

The 2021 DFB-Pokal final decided the winner of the 2020–21 DFB-Pokal, the 78th season of the annual German football cup competition. The match was played on Thursday, 13 May 2021 (on the Feast of the Ascension, a German public holiday) at the Olympiastadion in Berlin. The match was originally scheduled for Saturday, 22 May 2021, but was moved to an earlier date prior to the completion of the league season in Germany. This was due to fixture density caused by the late start of the season, originating from the postponement of the end of the previous season as a result of the COVID-19 pandemic. As with other competitions, the match was played behind closed doors without any spectators.

The match featured RB Leipzig and Borussia Dortmund. Dortmund won the final 4–1 for their fifth DFB-Pokal title.

Due to the scheduling change, the match was the first DFB-Pokal final since 2008 to be played prior to the end of the league season, and the first final since 1985 to not be played on a Saturday. Additionally, it was the first final not played on a weekend since 1984, which was also the only prior final played on a Thursday.

As winners, Borussia Dortmund featured in the 2021 edition of the DFL-Supercup at the start of the following season, and faced the winners of the 2020–21 edition of the Bundesliga, Bayern Munich. The winner of the DFB-Pokal also earned automatic qualification for the group stage of the 2021–22 edition of the UEFA Europa League. However, as Dortmund already qualified for the 2021–22 edition of the UEFA Champions League through their position in the Bundesliga, the spot went to the team in sixth, Bayer Leverkusen, and the league's UEFA Europa Conference League play-off round spot went to the team in seventh, Union Berlin.

== Teams ==
In the following table, finals until 1943 were in the Tschammerpokal era, since 1953 were in the DFB-Pokal era.

| Team | Previous final appearances (bold indicates winners) |
|---|---|
| RB Leipzig | 1 (2019) |
| Borussia Dortmund | 9 (1963, **1965**, **1989**, 2008, **2012**, 2014, 2015, 2016, **2017**) |

== Route to the final ==
The DFB-Pokal began with 64 teams in a single-elimination knockout cup competition. There were a total of five rounds leading up to the final. Teams were drawn against each other, and the winner after 90 minutes advanced. If still tied, 30 minutes of extra time were played. If the score was still level, a penalty shoot-out was used to determine the winner.

Note: In all results below, the score of the finalist is given first (H: home; A: away).

| RB Leipzig | | Round | Borussia Dortmund | |
|---|---|---|---|---|
| Opponent | Result | 2020–21 DFB-Pokal | Opponent | Result |
| 1. FC Nürnberg | 3–0 (A) | First round | MSV Duisburg | 5–0 (A) |
| FC Augsburg | 3–0 (A) | Second round | Eintracht Braunschweig | 2–0 (A) |
| VfL Bochum | 4–0 (H) | Round of 16 | SC Paderborn | 3–2 (a.e.t.) (H) |
| VfL Wolfsburg | 2–0 (H) | Quarter-finals | Borussia Mönchengladbach | 1–0 (A) |
| Werder Bremen | 2–1 (a.e.t.) (A) | Semi-finals | Holstein Kiel | 5–0 (H) |

== Match ==
=== Details ===
13 May 2021
20:45 CEST

| RB Leipzig | 1–4 | Borussia Dortmund |
|---|---|---|
| Olmo 71' | Report | Sancho 5', 45+1'; Haaland 28', 87' |

Olympiastadion, Berlin
Attendance: 0
Referee: Felix Brych (Munich)

| **RB Leipzig** | **Borussia Dortmund** |

| GK | 1 | (Hungary) Péter Gulácsi |
| CB | 16 | (Germany) Lukas Klostermann |
| CB | 5 | (France) Dayot Upamecano | (yellow card) 45+1' |
| CB | 23 | (Germany) Marcel Halstenberg |
| DM | 44 | (Slovenia) Kevin Kampl | | (substituted off) 62' |
| RM | 22 | (France) Nordi Mukiele | | (substituted off) 62' |
| CM | 25 | (Spain) Dani Olmo | (yellow card) 81' |
| CM | 7 | (Austria) Marcel Sabitzer (c) |
| LM | 8 | (Mali) Amadou Haidara | | (substituted off) 70' |
| CF | 19 | (Norway) Alexander Sørloth | | (substituted off) 46' |
| CF | 11 | (South Korea) Hwang Hee-chan | | (substituted off) 46' |
Substitutes:
| GK | 33 | (Spain) Josep Martínez |
| DF | 4 | (Hungary) Willi Orbán |
| DF | 6 | (France) Ibrahima Konaté |
| DF | 39 | (Germany) Benjamin Henrichs | | (substituted on) 70' |
| MF | 10 | (Sweden) Emil Forsberg | | (substituted on) 62' |
| MF | 18 | (France) Christopher Nkunku | | (substituted on) 46' |
| MF | 27 | (Austria) Konrad Laimer | | (substituted on) 62' |
| FW | 9 | (Denmark) Yussuf Poulsen | | (substituted on) 46' |
| FW | 21 | (Netherlands) Justin Kluivert |
Manager:
(Germany) Julian Nagelsmann

| GK | 1 | (Switzerland) Roman Bürki |
| RB | 26 | (Poland) Łukasz Piszczek |
| CB | 16 | (Switzerland) Manuel Akanji |
| CB | 15 | (Germany) Mats Hummels | (yellow card) 90' |
| LB | 13 | (Portugal) Raphaël Guerreiro |
| DM | 23 | (Germany) Emre Can |
| CM | 22 | (England) Jude Bellingham | (yellow card) 25' | (substituted off) 46' |
| CM | 8 | (Germany) Mahmoud Dahoud | (yellow card) 50' | (substituted off) 74' |
| RW | 7 | (England) Jadon Sancho | (yellow card) 81' | (substituted off) 89' |
| CF | 9 | (Norway) Erling Haaland | | (substituted off) 90+2' |
| LW | 11 | (Germany) Marco Reus (c) | | (substituted off) 90+2' |
Substitutes:
| GK | 40 | (Germany) Stefan Drljača |
| DF | 14 | (Germany) Nico Schulz |
| DF | 24 | (Belgium) Thomas Meunier | | (substituted on) 89' |
| MF | 6 | (Denmark) Thomas Delaney | | (substituted on) 74' |
| MF | 19 | (Germany) Julian Brandt | | (substituted on) 90+2' |
| MF | 20 | (Brazil) Reinier |
| MF | 32 | (United States) Giovanni Reyna | | (substituted on) 90+2' |
| MF | 36 | (Germany) Ansgar Knauff |
| FW | 10 | (Belgium) Thorgan Hazard | | (substituted on) 46' |
Manager:
(Germany) Edin Terzić

Man of the Match:
Marco Reus (Borussia Dortmund)

Assistant referees:
Mark Borsch (Mönchengladbach)
Stefan Lupp (Zossen)
Fourth official:
Sascha Stegemann (Niederkassel)
Video assistant referee:
Günter Perl (Pullach)
Assistant video assistant referee:
Markus Häcker (Waren)

**Match rules**

- 90 minutes.
- 30 minutes of extra time if necessary.
- Penalty shoot-out if scores still level.
- Nine named substitutes.
- Maximum of five substitutions. (Note: Each team was given only three opportunities to make substitutions, with a fourth opportunity in extra time, excluding substitutions made at half-time, before the start of extra time and at half-time in extra time.)

== See also ==
- 2021 DFL-Supercup
- Football in Berlin
