= 2020–21 DFB-Pokal =

Tournament details
- Country: Germany
- Venue(s): Olympiastadion, Berlin
- Dates: 11 September 2020 – 13 May 2021
- Teams: 64

Final positions
- Champions: Borussia Dortmund (5th title)
- Runners-up: RB Leipzig
- Europa League: Bayer Leverkusen (Note: Since the winners of the DFB-Pokal, Borussia Dortmund, qualified for the Champions League based on their league position, the Europa League group stage spot awarded to the DFB-Pokal winner was passed to the sixth-placed team in the Bundesliga, Bayer Leverkusen.)

Tournament statistics
- Matches played: 63
- Goals scored: 230 (3.65 per match)
- Attendance: 33,841 (537 per match)
- Top goal scorer(s): Jadon Sancho (6 goals)

The 2020–21 DFB-Pokal was the 78th season of the annual German football cup competition. Sixty-four teams participated in the competition, including all teams from the previous year's Bundesliga and 2. Bundesliga. The competition began on 11 September 2020 with the first of six rounds and ended on 13 May 2021 with the final at the Olympiastadion in Berlin, a nominally neutral venue, which has hosted the final since 1985. The competition was originally scheduled to begin on 14 August 2020 and conclude on 22 May 2021, though this was delayed due to postponement of the previous season as a result of the COVID-19 pandemic. The DFB-Pokal is considered the second-most important club title in German football after the Bundesliga championship. The DFB-Pokal is run by the German Football Association (DFB).

Bundesliga side Bayern Munich were the two-time defending champions, having defeated Bayer Leverkusen 4–2 in the previous final to clinch a record 20th title. However, Bayern were knocked out of the competition in the second round by second-division side Holstein Kiel, losing on penalties following a 2–2 draw after extra time.

Borussia Dortmund won the final 4–1 against RB Leipzig for their fifth title. As winners, Dortmund featured in the 2021 edition of the DFL-Supercup at the start of the next season, and faced the champions of the 2020–21 Bundesliga, Bayern Munich. The winners of the DFB-Pokal also earned automatic qualification for the group stage of the 2021–22 edition of the UEFA Europa League. However, as Dortmund already qualified for the 2021–22 edition of the UEFA Champions League through their position in the Bundesliga, the spot went to the team in sixth place, and the league's UEFA Europa Conference League play-off round spot went to the team in seventh place.

== Effects of the COVID-19 pandemic ==
On 31 August 2020, the DFB Executive Committee decided to extend the use of five substitutions in matches to the 2020–21 season, which was implemented at the end of the previous season to lessen the impact of fixture congestion caused by the COVID-19 pandemic. The use of five substitutes, based on the decision of competition organisers, had been extended by IFAB until 2021. Due to the impact of the COVID-19 pandemic in Germany and the high economic and organisational effort required to host the fixture, including loss of ticket revenue for matches behind closed doors, many amateur teams in the competition decided to waive their home rights and exchange the duty of hosting the match with their opponents. The DFB in general allowed spectators if approved by the local health department, though away supporters were not permitted at the start of the competition.

== Participating clubs ==
The following 64 teams qualified for the competition:

Bundesliga the 18 clubs of the 2019–20 season	2. Bundesliga; the 18 clubs of the 2019–20 season	3. Liga; the top 4 clubs of the 2019–20 season
FC Augsburg; Hertha BSC; Union Berlin; Werder Bremen; Borussia Dortmund; Fortuna Düsseldorf; Eintracht Frankfurt; SC Freiburg; 1899 Hoffenheim; 1. FC Köln; RB Leipzig; Bayer Leverkusen; Mainz 05; Borussia Mönchengladbach; Bayern Munich; SC Paderborn; Schalke 04; VfL Wolfsburg	Erzgebirge Aue; Arminia Bielefeld; VfL Bochum; Darmstadt 98; Dynamo Dresden; Greuther Fürth; Hamburger SV; Hannover 96; 1. FC Heidenheim; Karlsruher SC; Holstein Kiel; 1. FC Nürnberg; VfL Osnabrück; Jahn Regensburg; SV Sandhausen; FC St. Pauli; VfB Stuttgart; Wehen Wiesbaden	Würzburger Kickers; Eintracht Braunschweig; FC Ingolstadt; MSV Duisburg (Note: MSV Duisburg qualified as the fifth-placed team of the 3. Liga as the champions Bayern Munich II were ineligible to participate.)
Representatives of the regional associations 24 representatives of 21 regional associations of the DFB, qualified (in general) through the 2019–20 Verbandspokal (Note: The three regions with the most participating teams in their league competitions (Bavaria, Lower Saxony, and Westphalia) were allowed to enter two teams for the competition.)
Baden: Waldhof Mannheim; Bavaria (Note: In addition to the Bavarian Cup winners, the best-placed amateur team of the Regionalliga Bayern also qualified.): 1860 Munich (CW) (Note: 1860 Munich qualified regardless of the outcome of the final of the Bavarian Cup, as Würzburger Kickers, the other finalists, already qualified for the DFB-Pokal through their 3. Liga position.); 1. FC Schweinfurt (RB) (Note: In September 2020, Türkgücü München appealed to the Munich district court (Landgericht München I) regarding the Bavarian Football Association's decision to register 1. FC Schweinfurt for the DFB-Pokal as the representative of the Regionalliga Bayern instead of Türkgücü München. This was a result of the extension of the 2019–20 Regionalliga Bayern season until 2021, which saw Türkgücü München promoted in mid-2020, though they did not receive the DFB-Pokal spot reserved for the best-placed amateur team of the league, which was given to the highest-placed team after Türkgücü München left the league, 1. FC Schweinfurt. On 27 October 2020, the judgement of a Nuremberg arbitral tribunal was pronounced, confirming the position of the Bavarian Football Association to register 1. FC Schweinfurt for the DFB-Pokal.); Berlin: VSG Altglienicke; Brandenburg: Union Fürstenwalde; Bremen: FC Oberneuland; Hamburg: Eintracht Norderstedt; Hesse: TSV Steinbach Haiger	Lower Rhine: Rot-Weiss Essen; Lower Saxony (Note: The Lower Saxony Cup was split into two paths: one for 3. Liga and Regionalliga Nord teams, and the other for amateur teams. The winners of each path qualified.): TSV Havelse (3L/RL); Eintracht Celle (Am.); Mecklenburg-Vorpommern: Hansa Rostock; Middle Rhine: 1. FC Düren; Rhineland: FV Engers; Saarland: SV Elversberg; Saxony: Chemnitzer FC	Saxony-Anhalt: 1. FC Magdeburg (Note: The Saxony-Anhalt Cup was abandoned on 15 July. The Saxony-Anhalt Football Association and the remaining participants agreed to enter 1. FC Magdeburg in the DFB-Pokal.); Schleswig-Holstein: SV Todesfelde; South Baden: 1. FC Rielasingen-Arlen; Southwest: 1. FC Kaiserslautern; Thuringia: Carl Zeiss Jena; Westphalia (Note: In addition to the Westphalian Cup winners, the winners of a play-off between the best-placed amateur Westphalian team of the Regionalliga West and the best-placed amateur team of the Oberliga Westfalen also qualified.): RSV Meinerzhagen (CW); SC Wiedenbrück (PO); Württemberg: SSV Ulm

== Format ==
=== Participation ===
The DFB-Pokal began with a round of 64 teams. The 36 teams of the Bundesliga and 2. Bundesliga, along with the top four finishers of the 3. Liga, automatically qualified for the tournament. Of the remaining slots, 21 were given to the cup winners of the regional football associations, the Verbandspokal. The three remaining slots were given to the three regional associations with the most men's teams, which were Bavaria, Lower Saxony, and Westphalia. The best-placed amateur team of the Regionalliga Bayern was given the Spot for Bavaria. For Lower Saxony, the Lower Saxony Cup was split into two paths: one for 3. Liga and Regionalliga Nord teams, and the other for amateur teams. The winners of each path qualified. For Westphalia, the winner of a play-off between the best-placed team of the Regionalliga West and Oberliga Westfalen also qualified. As every team was entitled to participate in local tournaments which qualified for the association cups, every team could in principle compete in the DFB-Pokal. Reserve teams and combined football sections were not permitted to enter, along with no two teams of the same association or corporation.

=== Draw ===
The draws for the different rounds were conducted as follows:

For the first round, the participating teams were split into two pots of 32 teams each. The first pot contained all teams which qualified through their regional cup competitions, the best four teams of the 3. Liga, and the bottom four teams of the 2. Bundesliga. Every team from this pot was drawn to a team from the second pot, which contained all remaining professional teams (all the teams of the Bundesliga and the remaining fourteen 2. Bundesliga teams). The teams from the first pot were set as the home team in the process.

The two-pot scenario was also applied for the second round, with the remaining 3. Liga and/or amateur team(s) in the first pot and the remaining Bundesliga and 2. Bundesliga teams in the other pot. Once again, the 3. Liga and/or amateur team(s) served as hosts. This time the pots did not have to be of equal size though, depending on the results of the first round. Theoretically, it was even possible that there could be only one pot, if all of the teams from one of the pots from the first round had beat all the others in the second pot. Once one pot was empty, the remaining pairings were drawn from the other pot, with the first-drawn team for a match serving as hosts.

For the remaining rounds, the draw was conducted from just one pot. Any remaining 3. Liga and/or amateur team(s) were the home team if drawn against a professional team. In every other case, the first-drawn team served as hosts.

=== Match rules ===
Teams met in one game per round. Matches took place for 90 minutes, with two halves of 45 minutes each. If still tied after regulation, 30 minutes of extra time were played, consisting of two periods of 15 minutes each. If the score was still level after this, the match was decided by a penalty shoot-out. A coin toss would decide who took the first penalty. A maximum of nine players could be listed on the substitute bench, while a maximum of five substitutions were allowed. However, each team was only given three opportunities to make substitutions, with a fourth opportunity in extra time, excluding substitutions made at half-time, before the start of extra time and at half-time in extra time. From the round of 16 onward, a video assistant referee was appointed for all DFB-Pokal matches. Though technically possible, VAR was not used for home matches of Bundesliga clubs prior to the round of 16 in order to provide a uniform approach to all matches.

=== Suspensions ===
If a player received five yellow cards in the competition, he was then suspended from the next cup match. Similarly, receiving a second yellow card suspended a player from the next cup match. If a player received a direct red card, they were suspended a minimum of one match, but the German Football Association reserved the right to increase the suspension.

=== Champion qualification ===
The winners of the DFB-Pokal earned automatic qualification for the group stage of next year's edition of the UEFA Europa League. If they had already qualified for the UEFA Champions League through position in the Bundesliga, then the spot would go to the team in sixth place, and the league's second qualifying round spot would go to the team in seventh placr. The winners also hosted the DFL-Supercup at the start of the next season, and faced the champions of the previous year's Bundesliga, unless the same team won the Bundesliga and the DFB-Pokal, completing a double. In that case, the runners-up of the Bundesliga would take the spot and host instead.

== Schedule ==
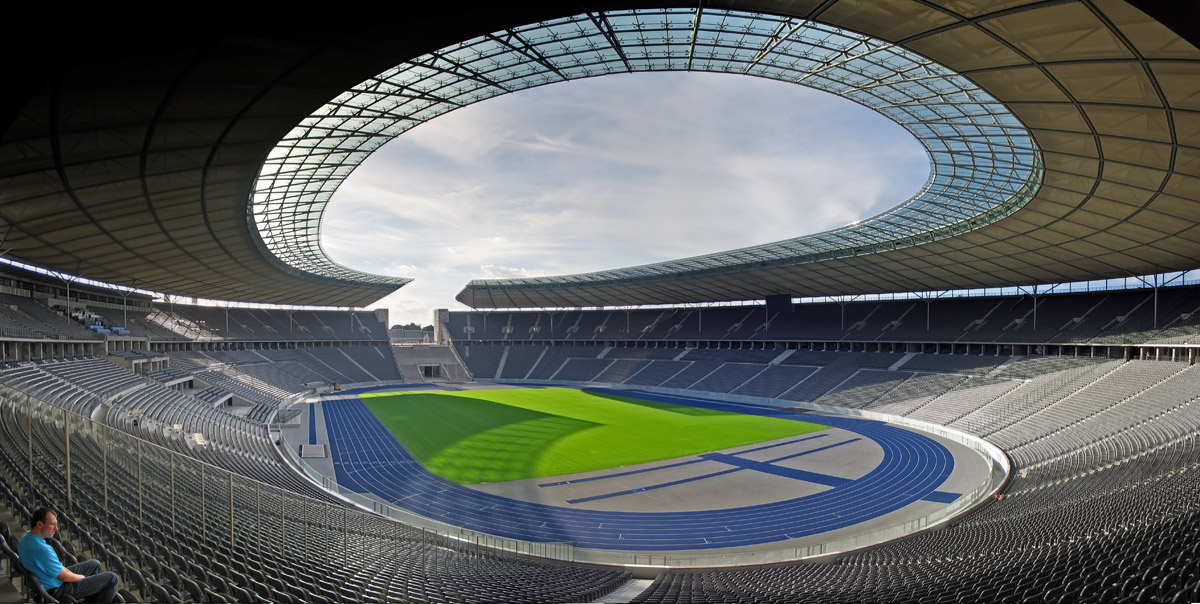
The Olympiastadion in Berlin hosted the final.

All draws were held at the German Football Museum in Dortmund, on a Sunday evening at 18:00 after each round (unless noted otherwise). The draws were televised on ARD's Sportschau, broadcast on Das Erste.

The rounds of the 2020–21 competition were scheduled as follows:

Round	Draw date	Matches
First round	26 July 2020	11–14 September 2020 (Note: Originally scheduled from 14–17 August 2020. Due to special circumstances, one match was played on 15 October 2020 and another on 3 November 2020.)
Second round	8 November 2020 (Note: Originally scheduled for 18 October 2020.)	22–23 December 2020 (Note: Originally scheduled from 27–28 October 2020. Due to special circumstances, two matches were played on 12–13 January 2021.)
Round of 16	3 January 2021	2–3 February 2021
Quarter-finals	7 February 2021	2–3 March 2021 (Note: Due to special circumstances, one match was played on 7 April 2021.)
Semi-finals	7 March 2021	30 April – 1 May 2021 (Note: Originally scheduled from 1–2 May 2021. The dates were subject to possible rescheduling to 20–21 April 2021, in a swap with matchday 30 of the Bundesliga and 2. Bundesliga, though this ultimately did not occur.)
Final	7 March 2021	13 May 2021 at Olympiastadion, Berlin (Note: Originally scheduled on 22 May 2021.)

== Matches ==
A total of sixty-three matches took place, starting with the first round on 14 August 2020 and culminating with the final on 22 May 2021 at the Olympiastadion in Berlin.

Times up to 25 October 2020 and from 28 March 2021 are CEST (UTC+2). Times from 26 October 2020 to 27 March 2021 are CET (UTC+1).

=== First round ===
The draw for the first round was held on 26 July 2020 at 18:30, with Heike Ullrich drawing the matches. As the winners of the Verbandspokal were not yet known, placeholders were used in the draw. Since SV Rödinghausen could still qualify as both the Westphalian Cup winner and the play-off winner at the time of the draw, the assignment of the two Westphalian teams required an additional draw after both competitions were completed. The second draw, which included RSV Meinerzhagen and SC Wiedenbrück, took place at the DFB headquarters in Frankfurt on 26 August 2020, 10:45, with Renate Lingor drawing the matches. The thirty-two matches took place from 11 to 14 September, 15 October and 3 November 2020.

11 September 2020	TSV Havelse	1–5	Mainz 05	Mainz (Note: Due to the impact of the COVID-19 pandemic in Germany and the organisational effort required to host the fixture, the teams exchanged the home rights to the match.)
20:45	Plume 17'	Report	Mateta 57', 79', 90'; Szalai 77'; Quaison 86'	Stadium: Opel Arena; Attendance: 1,000; Referee: Arne Aarnink

11 September 2020	Eintracht Braunschweig	5–4	Hertha BSC	Braunschweig
20:45	Kobylański 2', 44', 66'; Mittelstädt 17' (o.g.); Abdullahi 73'	Report	Lukebakio 23', 83'; Cunha 29'; Pekarík 65'	Stadium: Eintracht-Stadion; Attendance: 500; Referee: Tobias Stieler

12 September 2020	FV Engers	0–3	VfL Bochum	Bochum
15:30		Report	Žulj 23'; Zoller 52'; Pantović 65'	Stadium: Vonovia Ruhrstadion; Attendance: 0 (Note: The match was played behind closed doors due to the COVID-19 pandemic in Germany.); Referee: Florian Heft

12 September 2020	Union Fürstenwalde	1–4	VfL Wolfsburg	Wolfsburg (Note: The Union Fürstenwalde v VfL Wolfsburg match took place at the AOK-Stadion instead of VfL Wolfsburg's home stadium, the Volkswagen Arena.)
15:30	Geurts 9' (pen.)	Report	João Victor 24', 29'; Gerhardt 60'; Guilavogui 77'	Stadium: AOK-Stadion; Attendance: 0 Referee: Robert Schröder

12 September 2020	FC Oberneuland	0–8	Borussia Mönchengladbach	Mönchengladbach
15:30		Report	Herrmann 12', 13'; Hofmann 19'; Bensebaini 24'; Elvedi 35'; Neuhaus 52', 84'; Traoré 76'	Stadium: Borussia-Park; Attendance: 300; Referee: Sascha Stegemann

12 September 2020	RSV Meinerzhagen	1–6 (a.e.t.)	Greuther Fürth	Fürth
15:30	Wurm 50'	Report	Ernst 72'; Green 98'; Meyerhöfer 103', 105'; Abiama 113', 118'	Stadium: Sportpark Ronhof Thomas Sommer; Attendance: 0 Referee: Alexander Sather

12 September 2020	VSG Altglienicke	0–6	1. FC Köln	Cologne
15:30		Report	Hector 17' (pen.); Rexhbeçaj 36', 63'; Czichos 43'; Özcan 68'; Drexler 85'	Stadium: RheinEnergieStadion; Attendance: 300; Referee: Martin Thomsen

12 September 2020	1. FC Nürnberg	0–3	RB Leipzig	Nuremberg
15:30		Report	Haidara 3'; Poulsen 67'; Hwang 90'	Stadium: Max-Morlock-Stadion; Attendance: 0 Referee: Marco Fritz

12 September 2020	SV Todesfelde	0–1	VfL Osnabrück	Todesfelde
15:30		Report	Klaas 77'	Stadium: Joda Sportpark; Attendance: 500; Referee: Patrick Ittrich

12 September 2020	1860 Munich	1–2	Eintracht Frankfurt	Munich
15:30	Steinhart 78' (pen.)	Report	Silva 51'; Dost 56'	Stadium: Städtisches Stadion an der Grünwalder Straße; Attendance: 0 Referee: Martin Petersen

12 September 2020	Eintracht Celle	0–7	FC Augsburg	Augsburg
15:30		Report	Vargas 20'; Caligiuri 29'; Finnbogason 47' (pen.); Niederlechner 57'; Hahn 66'; Jensen 88', 90'	Stadium: WWK Arena; Attendance: 0 Referee: Daniel Schlager

12 September 2020	SSV Ulm	2–0	Erzgebirge Aue	Ulm
18:30	Rühle 37'; Higl 89'	Report		Stadium: Donaustadion; Attendance: 140; Referee: Michael Bacher

12 September 2020	FC Ingolstadt	0–1	Fortuna Düsseldorf	Ingolstadt
18:30		Report	Pledl 80'	Stadium: Audi Sportpark; Attendance: 0 Referee: Tobias Reichel

12 September 2020	Karlsruher SC	0–1 (a.e.t.)	Union Berlin	Karlsruhe
18:30		Report	Schlotterbeck 117'	Stadium: Wildparkstadion; Attendance: 450; Referee: Benjamin Cortus

12 September 2020	Carl Zeiss Jena	0–2	Werder Bremen	Jena
20:45		Report	Sargent 49'; Chong 88'	Stadium: Ernst-Abbe-Sportfeld; Attendance: 1,600; Referee: Daniel Siebert

13 September 2020	TSV Steinbach Haiger	1–2	SV Sandhausen	Haiger
15:30	Marquet 40'	Report	Biada 23', 45+1'	Stadium: Sibre-Sportzentrum Haarwasen; Attendance: 670; Referee: Nicolas Winter

13 September 2020	SV Elversberg	4–2	FC St. Pauli	Spiesen-Elversberg
15:30	Schnellbacher 16', 67'; Dragon 26'; Fellhauer 48'	Report	Knoll 7'; Benatelli 78'	Stadium: Ursapharm-Arena an der Kaiserlinde; Attendance: 500; Referee: Timo Gerach

13 September 2020	Eintracht Norderstedt	0–7	Bayer Leverkusen	Leverkusen
15:30		Report	L. Bender 4'; Amiri 10', 31'; Alario 12'; Wirtz 21'; Aránguiz 30'; Schick 77'	Stadium: BayArena; Attendance: 300; Referee: Sören Storks

13 September 2020	SC Wiedenbrück	0–5	SC Paderborn	Gütersloh (Note: The SC Wiedenbrück v SC Paderborn match took place at the Heidewald Stadion in Gütersloh instead of SC Wiedenbrück's home stadium, the Jahnstadion in Rheda-Wiedenbrück.)
15:30		Report	Michel 24'; Srbeny 32', 45+1', 58'; Führich 83'	Stadium: Heidewald Stadion; Attendance: 120; Referee: Frank Willenborg

13 September 2020	1. FC Kaiserslautern	1–1 (a.e.t.) (3–4 p)	Jahn Regensburg	Kaiserslautern
15:30	Kraus 64'	Report	Vrenezi 4'	Stadium: Fritz-Walter-Stadion; Attendance: 0 Referee: Sven Waschitzki
	Penalties
	Kraus (penalty scored); Hloušek (penalty missed); Skarlatidis (penalty scored); Pourié (penalty scored); Sickinger (penalty missed)		(penalty scored) Wekesser; (penalty scored) Gimber; (penalty scored) Vrenezi; (penalty missed) Elvedi; (penalty scored) Palionis

13 September 2020	Chemnitzer FC	2–2 (a.e.t.) (2–3 p)	1899 Hoffenheim	Chemnitz
15:30	Freiberger 59'; Bickel 100'	Report	Kramarić 48', 111' (pen.)	Stadium: Stadion an der Gellertstraße; Attendance: 3,095; Referee: Patrick Hanslbauer
	Penalties
	Grym (penalty missed); Müller (penalty missed); Freiberger (penalty scored); Campulka (penalty scored); Bickel (penalty missed)		(penalty scored) Kramarić; (penalty scored) Belfodil; (penalty missed) Gaćinović; (penalty missed) Bičakčić; (penalty scored) Baumgartner

13 September 2020	1. FC Rielasingen-Arlen	1–7	Holstein Kiel	Kiel
15:30	Niedermann 3'	Report	Wahl 15'; Serra 19'; Lee 22', 24'; Bartels 29'; Porath 63'; Reese 86'	Stadium: Holstein-Stadion; Attendance: 500; Referee: Christof Günsch

13 September 2020	Hansa Rostock	0–1	VfB Stuttgart	Rostock
15:30		Report	Silas 42'	Stadium: Ostseestadion; Attendance: 7,500; Referee: Felix Zwayer

13 September 2020	Waldhof Mannheim	1–2	SC Freiburg	Mannheim
18:30	Martinović 56'	Report	Kwon 19'; Schmid 79'	Stadium: Carl-Benz-Stadion; Attendance: 460; Referee: Markus Schmidt

13 September 2020	1. FC Magdeburg	2–3 (a.e.t.)	Darmstadt 98	Magdeburg
18:30	Müller 14'; Beck 26'	Report	Mehlem 53'; Kempe 66'; Honsak 100'	Stadium: MDCC-Arena; Attendance: 5,000; Referee: Manuel Gräfe

13 September 2020	Wehen Wiesbaden	1–0	1. FC Heidenheim	Wiesbaden
18:30	Tietz 61'	Report		Stadium: Brita-Arena; Attendance: 250; Referee: Benjamin Brand

14 September 2020	Dynamo Dresden	4–1	Hamburger SV	Dresden
18:30	Stark 3'; Becker 16'; Daferner 53'; Mai 90+5' (pen.)	Report	Onana 89'	Stadium: Rudolf-Harbig-Stadion; Attendance: 10,056; Referee: Florian Badstübner

14 September 2020	Würzburger Kickers	2–3	Hannover 96	Würzburg
18:30	Feick 89'; Herrmann 90+5' (pen.)	Report	Weydandt 23'; Kaiser 59'; Hübers 78'	Stadium: Flyeralarm Arena; Attendance: 0 Referee: Patrick Alt

14 September 2020	Rot-Weiss Essen	1–0	Arminia Bielefeld	Essen
18:30	Engelmann 33'	Report		Stadium: Stadion Essen; Attendance: 300; Referee: Harm Osmers

14 September 2020	MSV Duisburg	0–5	Borussia Dortmund	Duisburg
20:45		Report	Sancho 14' (pen.); Bellingham 30'; Hazard 39'; Reyna 50'; Reus 58'	Stadium: Schauinsland-Reisen-Arena; Attendance: 300; Referee: Robert Kampka

15 October 2020 (Note: The 1. FC Düren v Bayern Munich match, originally scheduled on 11 September 2020, 20:45, was rescheduled to 15 October 2020 following a request by Bayern Munich, as they reached the 2020 UEFA Champions League Final in August and had a heavy schedule in September.)	1. FC Düren	0–3	Bayern Munich	Munich
20:45		Report	Choupo-Moting 24', 75'; Müller 36' (pen.)	Stadium: Allianz Arena; Attendance: 0 Referee: Matthias Jöllenbeck

3 November 2020 (Note: The 1. FC Schweinfurt v Schalke 04 match, originally scheduled on 13 September 2020, 15:30, was postponed on 11 September 2020 due to the legal challenge of Türkgücü München regarding the spot allocated to the representative of the Regionalliga Bayern. On 27 October 2020, it was announced that the match was rescheduled for 3 November 2020.)	1. FC Schweinfurt	1–4	Schalke 04	Gelsenkirchen
16:30	Thomann 37'	Report	Ibišević 39'; Schöpf 44', 81'; Raman 86'	Stadium: Veltins-Arena; Attendance: 0 Referee: Sven Jablonski

=== Second round ===
The draw for the second round was held on 8 November 2020 at 18:30, with Inka Grings drawing the matches. It was originally scheduled for 18 October 2020 at 18:00, but was delayed due to the postponement of one first round match to November 2020. The sixteen matches took place from 22 to 23 December 2020 and from 12 to 13 January 2021.

22 December 2020	SSV Ulm	1–3	Schalke 04	Gelsenkirchen
18:30	Reichert 82'	Report	Serdar 27'; Raman 51', 63'	Stadium: Veltins-Arena; Attendance: 0 Referee: Daniel Schlager

22 December 2020	1. FC Köln	1–0	VfL Osnabrück	Cologne
18:30	Modeste 45+1'	Report		Stadium: RheinEnergieStadion; Attendance: 0 Referee: Robert Hartmann

22 December 2020	FC Augsburg	0–3	RB Leipzig	Augsburg
18:30		Report	Orbán 11'; Poulsen 75'; Angeliño 82'	Stadium: WWK Arena; Attendance: 0 Referee: Sascha Stegemann

22 December 2020	1899 Hoffenheim	2–2 (a.e.t.) (6–7 p)	Greuther Fürth	Sinsheim
18:30	Kramarić 13'; Akpoguma 49'	Report	Ernst 21'; Meyerhöfer 46'	Stadium: PreZero Arena; Attendance: 0 Referee: Sören Storks
	Penalties
	Kramarić (penalty scored); Rudy (penalty scored); Skov (penalty scored); Adamyan (penalty scored); Vogt (penalty missed); Bogarde (penalty missed); Akpoguma (penalty scored); Sessegnon (penalty scored); Kasim (penalty missed)		(penalty missed) Bauer; (penalty scored) Raum; (penalty scored) Seguin; (penalty scored) Sarpei; (penalty scored) Hrgota; (penalty missed) Ernst; (penalty scored) Jaeckel; (penalty scored) Tillman; (penalty scored) Meyerhöfer

22 December 2020	Eintracht Braunschweig	0–2	Borussia Dortmund	Braunschweig
20:00		Report	Hummels 12'; Sancho 90+2'	Stadium: Eintracht-Stadion; Attendance: 0 Referee: Benjamin Cortus

22 December 2020	SV Elversberg	0–5	Borussia Mönchengladbach	Spiesen-Elversberg
20:45		Report	Wolf 5'; Bénes 21'; Stindl 35'; Herrmann 69'; Villalba 83' (pen.)	Stadium: Ursapharm-Arena an der Kaiserlinde; Attendance: 0 Referee: Markus Schmidt

22 December 2020	Dynamo Dresden	0–3	Darmstadt 98	Dresden
20:45		Report	Schnellhardt 24'; Paik 59'; Dursun 71'	Stadium: Rudolf-Harbig-Stadion; Attendance: 0 Referee: Sven Jablonski

22 December 2020	Union Berlin	2–3	SC Paderborn	Berlin
20:45	Prömel 6'; Hünemeier 57' (o.g.)	Report	Michel 3', 36'; Srbeny 31'	Stadium: Stadion An der Alten Försterei; Attendance: 0 Referee: Frank Willenborg

23 December 2020	Rot-Weiss Essen	3–2	Fortuna Düsseldorf	Essen
18:30	Engelmann 15'; Kehl-Gómez 39'; Kefkir 70'	Report	Hennings 36', 87' (pen.)	Stadium: Stadion Essen; Attendance: 0 Referee: Matthias Jöllenbeck

23 December 2020	VfL Wolfsburg	4–0	SV Sandhausen	Wolfsburg
18:30	Gerhardt 27'; Weghorst 29', 90+1'; João Victor 41'	Report		Stadium: Volkswagen Arena; Attendance: 0 Referee: Guido Winkmann

23 December 2020	VfB Stuttgart	1–0	SC Freiburg	Stuttgart
20:45	Kalajdžić 15'	Report		Stadium: Mercedes-Benz Arena; Attendance: 0 Referee: Felix Brych

23 December 2020	Wehen Wiesbaden	0–0 (a.e.t.) (2–4 p)	Jahn Regensburg	Wiesbaden
20:45		Report		Stadium: Brita-Arena; Attendance: 0 Referee: Tobias Reichel
	Penalties
	Kempe (penalty scored); Tietz (penalty missed); Gürleyen (penalty scored); Prokop (penalty missed)		(penalty scored) Wekesser; (penalty scored) Albers; (penalty scored) George; (penalty scored) Opoku

23 December 2020	Hannover 96	0–3	Werder Bremen	Hanover
20:45		Report	Gebre Selassie 30'; Sargent 32'; Mbom 60'	Stadium: HDI-Arena; Attendance: 0 Referee: Manuel Gräfe

23 December 2020	Mainz 05	2–2 (a.e.t.) (0–3 p)	VfL Bochum	Mainz
20:45	Boëtius 7'; Latza 55'	Report	Holtmann 66'; Tesche 90+4'	Stadium: Opel Arena; Attendance: 0 Referee: Martin Petersen
	Penalties
	Szalai (penalty missed); Stöger (penalty missed); Mateta (penalty missed)		(penalty scored) Pantović; (penalty scored) Mašović; (penalty scored) Ganvoula

12 January 2021 (Note: The Bayer Leverkusen v Eintracht Frankfurt match, originally scheduled on 23 December 2020, 20:45, was rescheduled to 12 January 2021 following a request by Bayer Leverkusen, as they had a heavy schedule in December.)	Bayer Leverkusen	4–1	Eintracht Frankfurt	Leverkusen
20:45	Alario 27' (pen.); Tapsoba 49'; Diaby 67', 87'	Report	Younes 6'	Stadium: BayArena; Attendance: 0 Referee: Christian Dingert

13 January 2021 (Note: The Holstein Kiel v Bayern Munich match was scheduled for 13 January 2021, outside the allotted window in the schedule, following a request by Bayern Munich, as they had a heavy schedule in December.)	Holstein Kiel	2–2 (a.e.t.) (6–5 p)	Bayern Munich	Kiel
20:45	Bartels 37'; Wahl 90+5'	Report	Gnabry 14'; Sané 47'	Stadium: Holstein-Stadion; Attendance: 0 Referee: Robert Schröder
	Penalties
	Wahl (penalty scored); Arslan (penalty scored); Serra (penalty scored); Lee (penalty scored); Hauptmann (penalty scored); Bartels (penalty scored)		(penalty scored) Lewandowski; (penalty scored) Kimmich; (penalty scored) Müller; (penalty scored) Alaba; (penalty scored) Costa; (penalty missed) Roca

=== Round of 16 ===
The draw for the round of 16 was held on 3 January 2021 at 17:30, with Sven Hannawald drawing the matches. The eight matches took place from 2 to 3 February 2021.

2 February 2021	Rot-Weiss Essen	2–1 (a.e.t.)	Bayer Leverkusen	Essen
18:30	Kefkir 108'; Engelmann 117'	Report	Bailey 105'	Stadium: Stadion Essen; Attendance: 0 Referee: Daniel Schlager

2 February 2021	Holstein Kiel	1–1 (a.e.t.) (7–6 p)	Darmstadt 98	Kiel
18:30	Serra 58'	Report	Dursun 86'	Stadium: Holstein-Stadion; Attendance: 0 Referee: Sören Storks
	Penalties
	Wahl (penalty missed); Arslan (penalty scored); Serra (penalty scored); Porath (penalty scored); Lee (penalty scored); Bartels (penalty scored); Hauptmann (penalty missed); Kirkeskov (penalty scored); Lorenz (penalty scored)		(penalty missed) Mehlem; (penalty scored) Dursun; (penalty scored) Holland; (penalty scored) Mai; (penalty scored) Paik; (penalty scored) Höhn; (penalty missed) Honsak; (penalty scored) Rapp; (penalty missed) Skarke

2 February 2021	Werder Bremen	2–0	Greuther Fürth	Bremen
20:45	Möhwald 12'; Agu 73'	Report		Stadium: Wohninvest Weserstadion; Attendance: 0 Referee: Guido Winkmann

2 February 2021	Borussia Dortmund	3–2 (a.e.t.)	SC Paderborn	Dortmund
20:45	Can 6'; Sancho 16'; Haaland 95'	Report	Justvan 79'; Owusu 90+7' (pen.)	Stadium: Signal Iduna Park; Attendance: 0 Referee: Tobias Stieler

3 February 2021	VfL Wolfsburg	1–0	Schalke 04	Wolfsburg
18:30	Weghorst 40'	Report		Stadium: Volkswagen Arena; Attendance: 0 Referee: Felix Zwayer

3 February 2021	RB Leipzig	4–0	VfL Bochum	Leipzig
18:30	Haidara 11'; Sabitzer 45+1' (pen.); Poulsen 66', 75'	Report		Stadium: Red Bull Arena; Attendance: 0 Referee: Bastian Dankert

3 February 2021	Jahn Regensburg	2–2 (a.e.t.) (4–3 p)	1. FC Köln	Regensburg
20:45	Kennedy 35'; George 43'	Report	Jakobs 4'; Dennis 22'	Stadium: Jahnstadion Regensburg; Attendance: 0 Referee: Robert Hartmann
	Penalties
	Wekesser (penalty scored); Gimber (penalty scored); Albers (penalty missed); Vrenezi (penalty scored); Besuschkow (penalty scored)		(penalty scored) Czichos; (penalty scored) Özcan; (penalty scored) Arokodare; (penalty missed) Meré; (penalty missed) J. Horn

3 February 2021	VfB Stuttgart	1–2	Borussia Mönchengladbach	Stuttgart
20:45	Silas 2'	Report	Thuram 45+1'; Pléa 50'	Stadium: Mercedes-Benz Arena; Attendance: 0 Referee: Daniel Siebert

=== Quarter-finals ===
The draw for the quarter-finals was held on 7 February 2021 at 18:30, with Boris Herrmann drawing the matches. The four matches took place from 2 to 3 March and 7 April 2021.

2 March 2021	Borussia Mönchengladbach	0–1	Borussia Dortmund	Mönchengladbach
20:45		Report	Sancho 66'	Stadium: Borussia-Park; Attendance: 0 Referee: Sascha Stegemann

3 March 2021	Rot-Weiss Essen	0–3	Holstein Kiel	Essen
18:30		Report	Mühling 26' (pen.); Serra 28'; Mees 90'	Stadium: Stadion Essen; Attendance: 0 Referee: Markus Schmidt

3 March 2021	RB Leipzig	2–0	VfL Wolfsburg	Leipzig
20:45	Poulsen 63'; Hwang 88'	Report		Stadium: Red Bull Arena; Attendance: 0 Referee: Marco Fritz

7 April 2021 (Note: The Jahn Regensburg v Werder Bremen match, originally scheduled on 2 March 2021, 18:30, was postponed to 7 April 2021 after the Jahn Regensburg team were placed into quarantine due to players and staff members of the club testing positive for SARS-CoV-2.)	Jahn Regensburg	0–1	Werder Bremen	Regensburg
18:30		Report	Osako 52'	Stadium: Jahnstadion Regensburg; Attendance: 0 Referee: Guido Winkmann

=== Semi-finals ===
The draw for the semi-finals was held on 7 March 2021 at 18:30, with Bärbel Wohlleben drawing the matches. The two matches took place on 30 April and 1 May 2021.

30 April 2021 (Note: The Werder Bremen v RB Leipzig match, originally scheduled on 2 May 2021, 20:30, was rescheduled to 30 April 2021 for undisclosed reasons.)
20:30

Werder Bremen	1–2 (a.e.t.)	RB Leipzig
Bittencourt 105+1'	Report	Hwang 93'; Forsberg 120+1'

Weser-Stadion, Bremen
Attendance: 0
Referee: Manuel Gräfe

1 May 2021
20:30

Borussia Dortmund	5–0	Holstein Kiel
Reyna 16', 22'; Reus 26'; Hazard 32'; Bellingham 41'	Report

Signal Iduna Park, Dortmund
Attendance: 0
Referee: Christian Dingert

=== Final ===
The final took place on 13 May 2021 at the Olympiastadion in Berlin.

13 May 2021
20:45 CEST

RB Leipzig	1–4	Borussia Dortmund
Olmo 71'	Report	Sancho 5', 45+1'; Haaland 28', 87'

Olympiastadion, Berlin
Attendance: 0
Referee: Felix Brych (Munich)

== Top goalscorers ==
The following were the top scorers of the DFB-Pokal, sorted first by number of goals, and then alphabetically if necessary. Goals scored in penalty shoot-outs are not included.

Rank	Player	Team	Goals
1	(England) Jadon Sancho	Borussia Dortmund	6
2	(Denmark) Yussuf Poulsen	RB Leipzig	5
3	(Germany) Dennis Srbeny	SC Paderborn	4
4	(Germany) Simon Engelmann	Rot-Weiss Essen	3
4	(Norway) Erling Haaland	Borussia Dortmund	3
4	(Germany) Patrick Herrmann	Borussia Mönchengladbach	3
4	(South Korea) Hwang Hee-chan	RB Leipzig	3
4	(Poland) Martin Kobylański	Eintracht Braunschweig	3
4	(Croatia) Andrej Kramarić	1899 Hoffenheim	3
4	(France) Jean-Philippe Mateta	Mainz 05	3
4	(Germany) Marco Meyerhöfer	Greuther Fürth	3
4	(Germany) Sven Michel	SC Paderborn	3
4	(Belgium) Benito Raman	Schalke 04	3
4	(United States) Giovanni Reyna	Borussia Dortmund	3
4	(Germany) Janni Serra	Holstein Kiel	3
4	(Brazil) João Victor	VfL Wolfsburg	3
4	(Netherlands) Wout Weghorst	VfL Wolfsburg	3
