= Dayot Upamecano =

French footballer (born 1998)

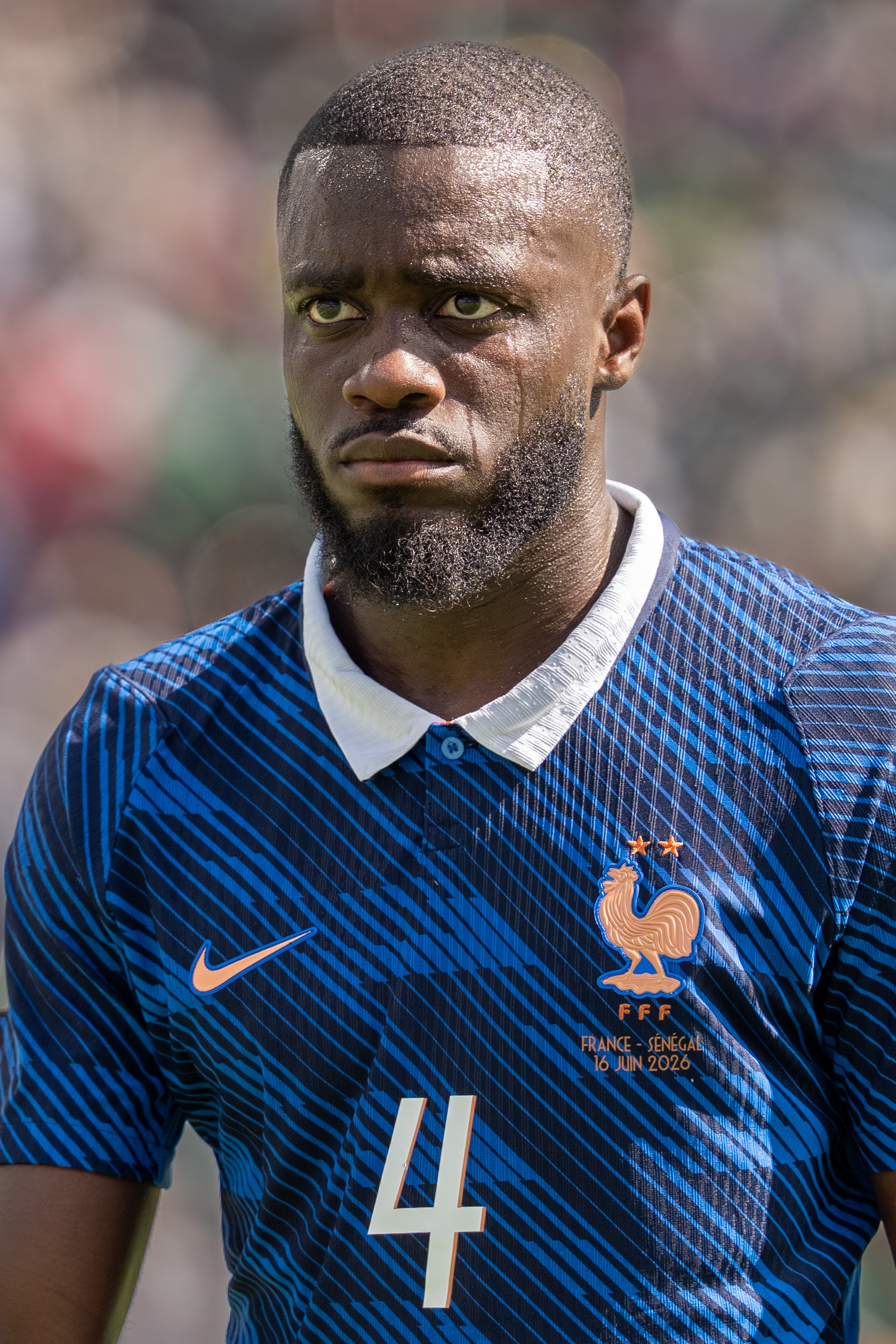
- Upamecano with France in 2026

Personal information
- Full name: Dayotchanculle Oswald Upamecano
- Date of birth: 27 October 1998 (age 28)
- Place of birth: Évreux, Eure, France
- Height: 1.86 m (6 ft 1 in)
- Position: Centre-back

Team information
- Current team: Bayern Munich
- Number: 2

Youth career
- 2004–2007: Vaillante S. Angers
- 2008–2009: FC De Prey
- 2009–2013: Évreux
- 2013–2015: Valenciennes

Senior career*
Years	Team	Apps	(Gls)
2015–2016	Liefering	16	(0)
2016–2017	Red Bull Salzburg	17	(0)
2017–2021	RB Leipzig	112	(4)
2021–	Bayern Munich	136	(8)

International career^{‡}
2014	France U16	3	(0)
2014–2015	France U17	12	(0)
2015–2016	France U18	10	(1)
2016–2017	France U19	6	(0)
2018–2021	France U21	16	(1)
2020–	France	49	(2)
Medal record
Men's football
Representing France
FIFA World Cup
Runner-up	2022 Qatar
UEFA Nations League
Winner	2021 Italy
UEFA European Under-17 Championship
Winner	2015 Bulgaria
- * Club domestic league appearances and goals as of 21:24, 20 November 2026 (UTC) ‡ National team caps and goals as of 22:15, 12 November 2026 (UTC)

Dayotchanculle Oswald Upamecano (French: [dajo upamekano]; born 27 October 1998) is a French professional footballer who plays as a centre-back for Bundesliga club Bayern Munich and the France national team.

== Early and personal life ==
Dayotchanculle Oswald Upamecano was born on 27 October 1998 in Évreux, Eure, and is of Bissau-Guinean descent. He was raised in La Madeleine, a neighbourhood with many African immigrants. He was named after his great-grandfather, who was king of the village on the island of Jeta in Guinea-Bissau, where his parents are from. His mother is Senegalese. He is the first son after four daughters, and has one younger brother. He acquired French nationality on 19 November 2002, through the collective effect of his mother's naturalization. As a 15-year-old, he followed speech therapy sessions to overcome dyslexia and stuttering disorders, which caused shyness and certain difficulties in expressing himself.

== Club career ==
=== Early career ===
Upamecano began playing football with local club Évreux, alongside the likes of Ousmane Dembélé, Rafik Guitane and Samuel Grandsir. He covered a variety of positions in his youth, before being fixed on the centre-back position. He joined the youth academy of Valenciennes in 2013. Described during the time as a youth in an adult body, Upamecano shaped his play after Sergio Ramos, and developed into a physically imposing defender.

=== Red Bull Salzburg ===
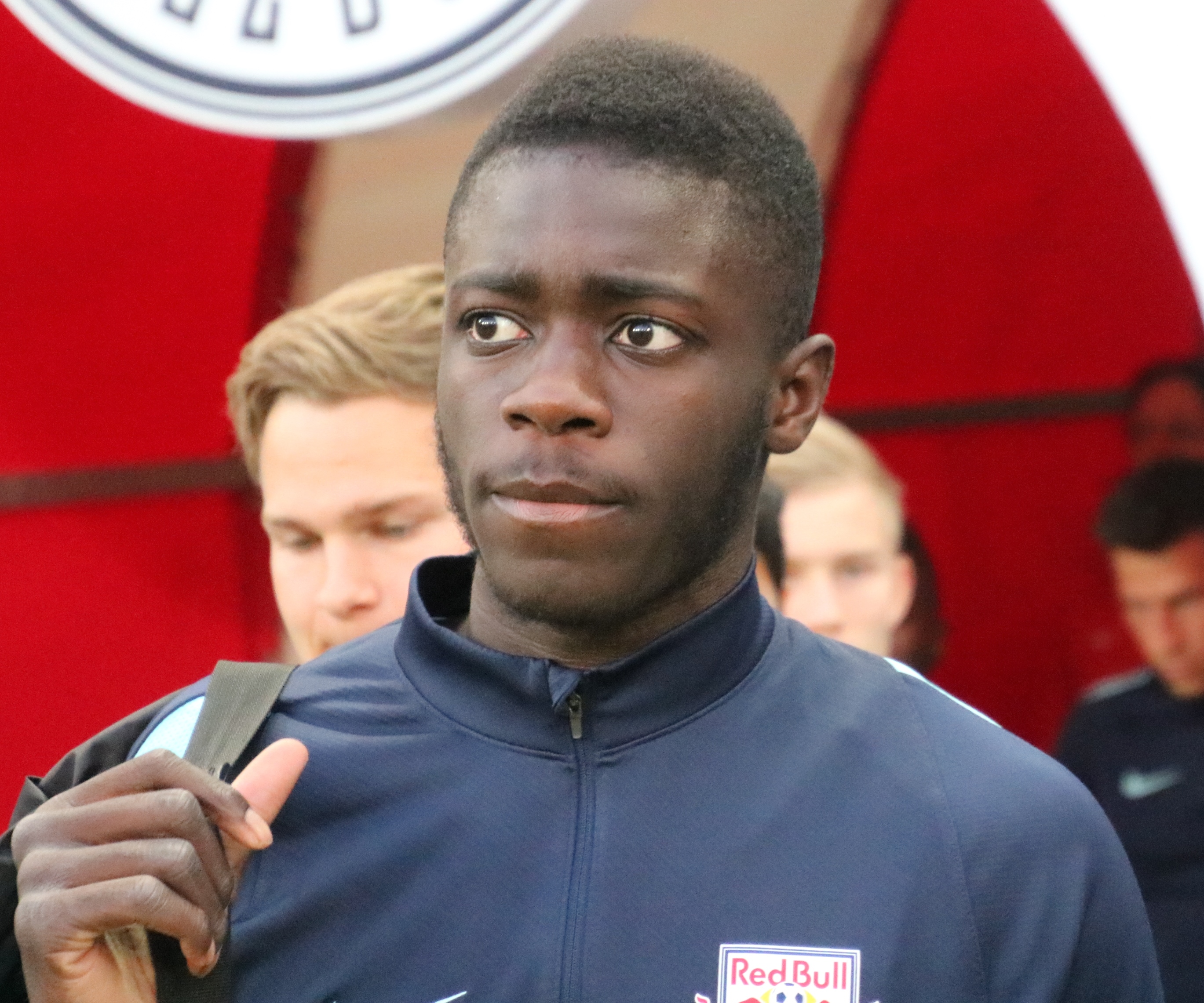
Upamecano with Red Bull Salzburg in 2016

After attracting the attention of a number of major European clubs, Upamecano joined Red Bull Salzburg in July 2015 for a reported fee of €2.2 million. He was an unused substitute in Red Bull's UEFA Champions League game against Malmö FF on 29 July 2015. He made his professional debut for Red Bull's farm team, FC Liefering, two days later, in a 2–1 league win against St. Pölten. On 19 March 2016, he made his league debut with Red Bull Salzburg in a 2–1 win over SV Mattersburg.

In the first half of the 2016–17 season, Upamecano earned a regular place with the first team in both league and Europa League matches.

=== RB Leipzig ===
On 13 January 2017, Upamecano joined RB Leipzig on a 4 1/2-year deal, for a reported €10 million fee. On 4 February 2017, he made his Bundesliga debut under coach Ralph Hasenhüttl in a 1–0 defeat against Borussia Dortmund. On 13 September 2017, he made his Champions League debut in a 1–1 draw against Monaco. On 9 February 2018, he scored his first goal in a 2–0 win over Augsburg. On 2 July 2018, he was shortlisted for the 2018 Golden Boy award.

On 31 July 2020, Upamecano signed a new deal with the club, running until 2023. In the 2019–20 season, he reached the UEFA Champions League semi-finals with Leipzig under coach Julian Nagelsmann.

=== Bayern Munich ===
On 14 February 2021, fellow German club Bayern Munich announced an agreement for the signing of Upamecano on a five-year deal, effective immediately from 1 July. The club reportedly met his release clause from Leipzig, set at €42.5 million. Upamecano's first game as a Bayern player came in a pre-season friendly on 16 July against fellow Bundesliga side 1. FC Köln that saw Bayern lose 3–2 after fielding a side primarily consisting of reserve and youth players.

He made his competitive debut on the opening day of the 2021–22 Bundesliga season, starting at centre-back alongside Niklas Süle in a 1–1 away draw against Borussia Mönchengladbach on 13 August 2021. He scored his first goal for the club in a 4–0 win over VfL Wolfsburg on 17 December, heading in a cross from Thomas Müller.

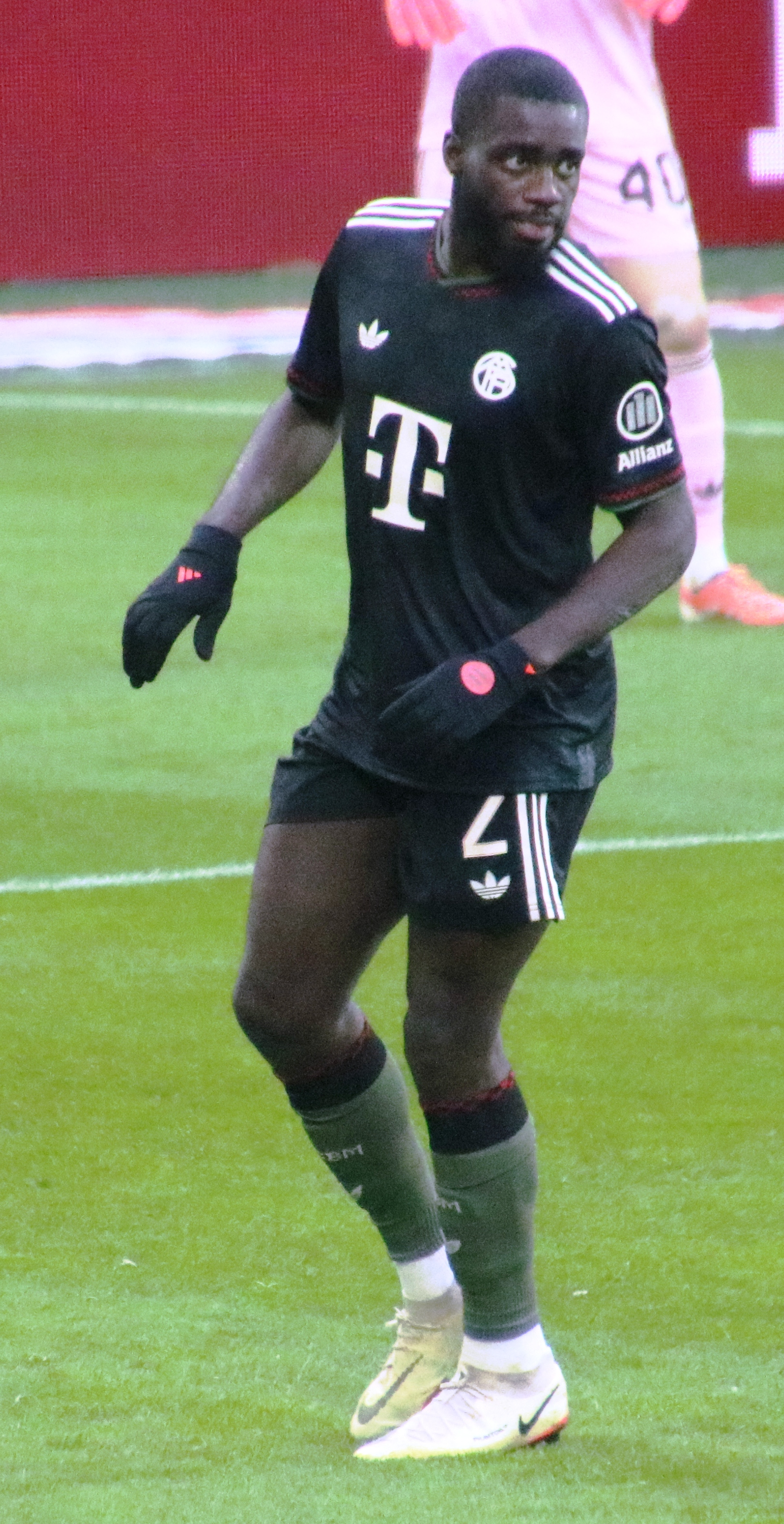
Upamecano playing for Bayern Munich in 2026

During the 2022–23 UEFA Champions League, Bayern defeated Paris Saint-Germain in the round of 16, only for them to be eliminated by a 4–1 defeat on aggregate to Manchester City in the quarter-finals, in which Upamecano's performances were heavily criticised. Due to this, a beIN SPORTS' Arabic commentator referred to Upamecano as "Upamaguire" (a portmanteau of Upamecano and Harry Maguire; this being due to the latter's poor form at the time).

On 4 November 2023, he scored his first goal of the 2023–24 season in the fourth minute of a 4–0 away win over Borussia Dortmund. In February 2024, Upamecano was sent off twice in the span of four days: on 14 February, he received his first straight red card in the Champions League during the round of 16 first leg away match against Lazio, which resulted in a penalty kick and a 1–0 defeat; on 18 February, he received two yellow cards and again conceded a penalty in a 3–2 loss to Bochum in the Bundesliga.

Under new Bayern manager Vincent Kompany's coaching, Upamecano's performances improved drastically, as he helped Bayern reclaim the 2024–25 Bundesliga title. On 13 February 2026, he extended his contract with the club until 2030. Two months later, on 28 April, he scored his first Champions League goal in a 5–4 away defeat against Paris Saint-Germain in the competition's semi-final first leg.

== International career ==
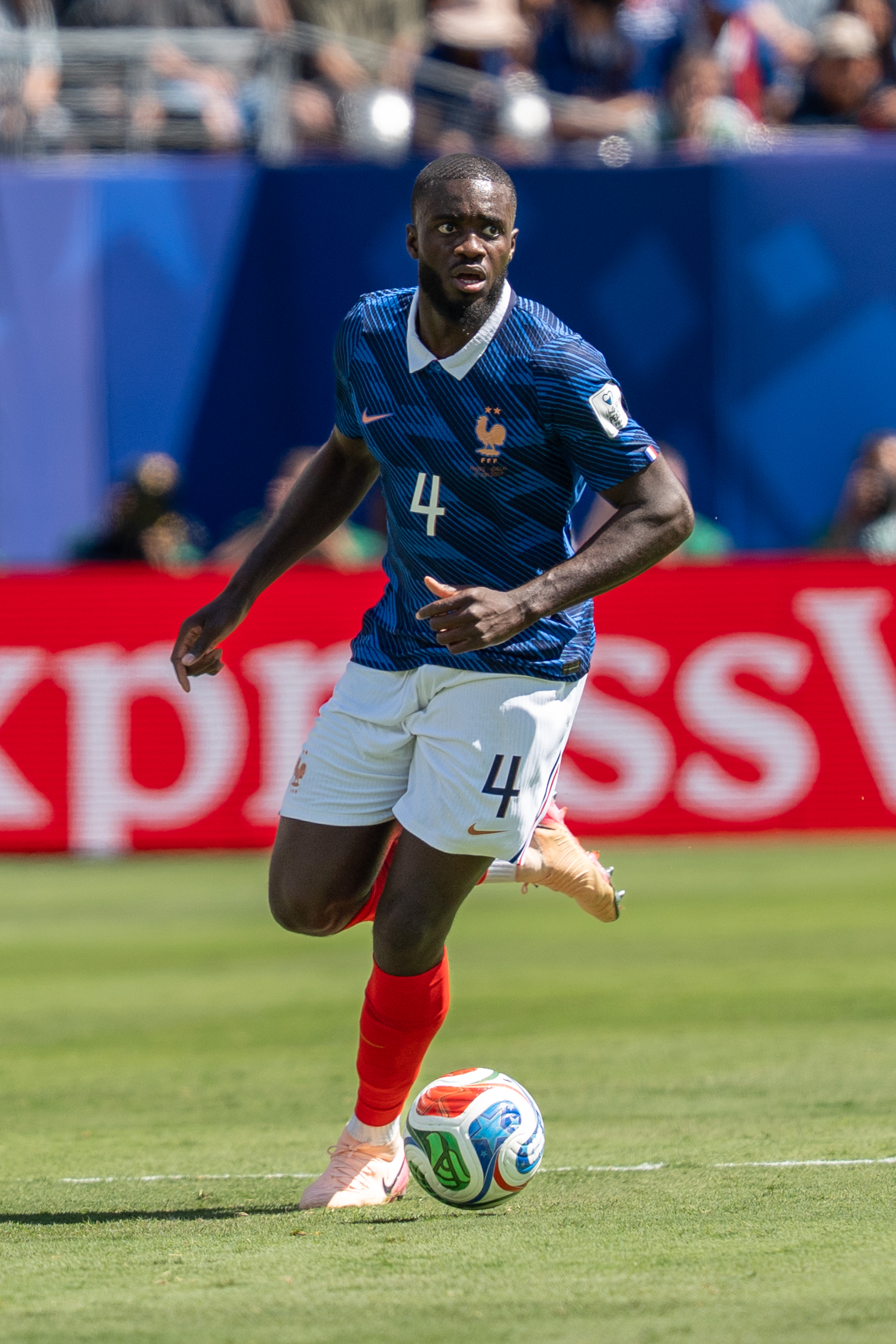
Upamecano on the ball for France at the 2026 FIFA World Cup

Upamecano played for the France under-16 team that finished third in the 2014 Aegean Cup. He played in three of his country's four games and was named the competition's best defender. He subsequently moved up to the France under-17 squad, making his debut in a European Championship qualifier against Cyprus on 27 October 2014. France won the 2015 UEFA European Under-17 Championship, with Upamecano playing in all six of his country's matches and being named in the team of the tournament. He debuted for France under-18 in a 0–0 friendly draw with United States under-18 on 4 September 2015.

On 5 September 2020, Upamecano made his senior debut for the France national team, starting in a UEFA Nations League group stage match against Sweden. Three days later on 8 September, he scored his first international goal in a 4–2 victory against Croatia.

Upamecano played a pivotal role in France's 2022 FIFA World Cup, starting five of France's seven matches. This included playing the entire 120 minutes in the final in an eventual 3–3 loss in penalties to Argentina.

On 14 May 2026, he was selected in the 26-man squad for the 2026 FIFA World Cup. Upamecano and the rest of the team would finish the tournament in fourth place as England won the third-place match 6–4.

== Career statistics ==
=== Club ===
As of match played 20 November 2026

Appearances and goals by club, season and competition
Club	Season	League			National cup (Note: Includes Austrian Cup, DFB-Pokal)		Europe		Other		Total	
Club	Season	Division	Apps	Goals	Apps	Goals	Apps	Goals	Apps	Goals	Apps	Goals
FC Liefering	2015–16	Austrian First League	16	0	—		—		—		16	0
Red Bull Salzburg	2015–16	Austrian Bundesliga	2	0	0	0	0	0	—		2	0
Red Bull Salzburg	2016–17	Austrian Bundesliga	15	0	1	0	5 (Note: One appearance in UEFA Champions League, four appearances in UEFA Europa League)	0	—		21	0
Red Bull Salzburg	Total		17	0	1	0	5	0	—		23	0
RB Leipzig	2016–17	Bundesliga	12	0	0	0	—		—		12	0
RB Leipzig	2017–18	Bundesliga	28	3	2	0	11 (Note: Five appearances in UEFA Champions League, six appearances in UEFA Europa League)	0	—		41	3
RB Leipzig	2018–19	Bundesliga	15	0	3	0	4 (Note: Appearances in UEFA Europa League)	0	—		22	0
RB Leipzig	2019–20	Bundesliga	28	0	2	0	8 (Note: Appearances in UEFA Champions League)	0	—		38	0
RB Leipzig	2020–21	Bundesliga	29	1	5	0	7	0	—		41	1
RB Leipzig	Total		112	4	12	0	30	0	—		154	4
Bayern Munich	2021–22	Bundesliga	28	1	1	0	8	0	1 (Note: Appearance in DFL-/Franz Beckenbauer Supercup)	0	38	1
Bayern Munich	2022–23	Bundesliga	29	0	3	1	10	0	1	0	43	1
Bayern Munich	2023–24	Bundesliga	25	1	0	0	7	0	1	0	33	1
Bayern Munich	2024–25	Bundesliga	20	2	2	0	11	0	5 (Note: Appearances in FIFA Club World Cup)	0	38	2
Bayern Munich	2025–26	Bundesliga	24	1	5	0	12	1	1	0	42	2
Bayern Munich	2026–27	Bundesliga	10	3	0	0	4	0	0	0	14	3
Bayern Munich	Total		136	8	11	1	52	1	9	0	208	10
Career total			282	12	24	1	87	1	9	0	401	14

=== International ===
As of match played 12 November 2026

Appearances and goals by national team and year
National team	Year	Apps	Goals
France	2020	3	1
France	2021	3	0
France	2022	6	0
France	2023	5	1
France	2024	11	0
France	2025	7	0
France	2026	14	0
Total		49	2

As of match played 12 November 2026
Scores and results list France's goal tally first, score column indicates score after each Upamecano goal

List of international goals scored by Dayot Upamecano
No.	Date	Venue	Cap	Opponent	Score	Result	Competition	Ref.
1	8 September 2020	Stade de France, Saint-Denis, France	2	Croatia	3–2	4–2	2020–21 UEFA Nations League A	
2	24 March 2023	Stade de France, Saint-Denis, France	13	Netherlands	2–0	4–0	UEFA Euro 2024 qualifying	

== Honours ==
Bayern Munich

- Bundesliga: 2021–22, 2022–23, 2024–25, 2025–26
- DFB-Pokal: 2025–26
- DFL-/Franz Beckenbauer Supercup: 2021, 2022, 2025, 2026

France U17

- UEFA European Under-17 Championship: 2015

France

- UEFA Nations League: 2020–21
- FIFA World Cup runner-up: 2022

Individual

- Ballon d'Or nominee: 2026
- Bundesliga Team of the Season: 2024–25, 2025–26
- ESM Team of the Year: 2019–20
- FIFA World Cup Dream XI: 2026
- UEFA European Under-17 Championship Team of the Tournament: 2015
- UEFA Champions League Squad of the Season: 2019–20
- VDV Bundesliga Team of the Season: 2020–21, 2022–23, 2024–25, 2025–26
