= Julian Nagelsmann =

German football manager (born 1987)

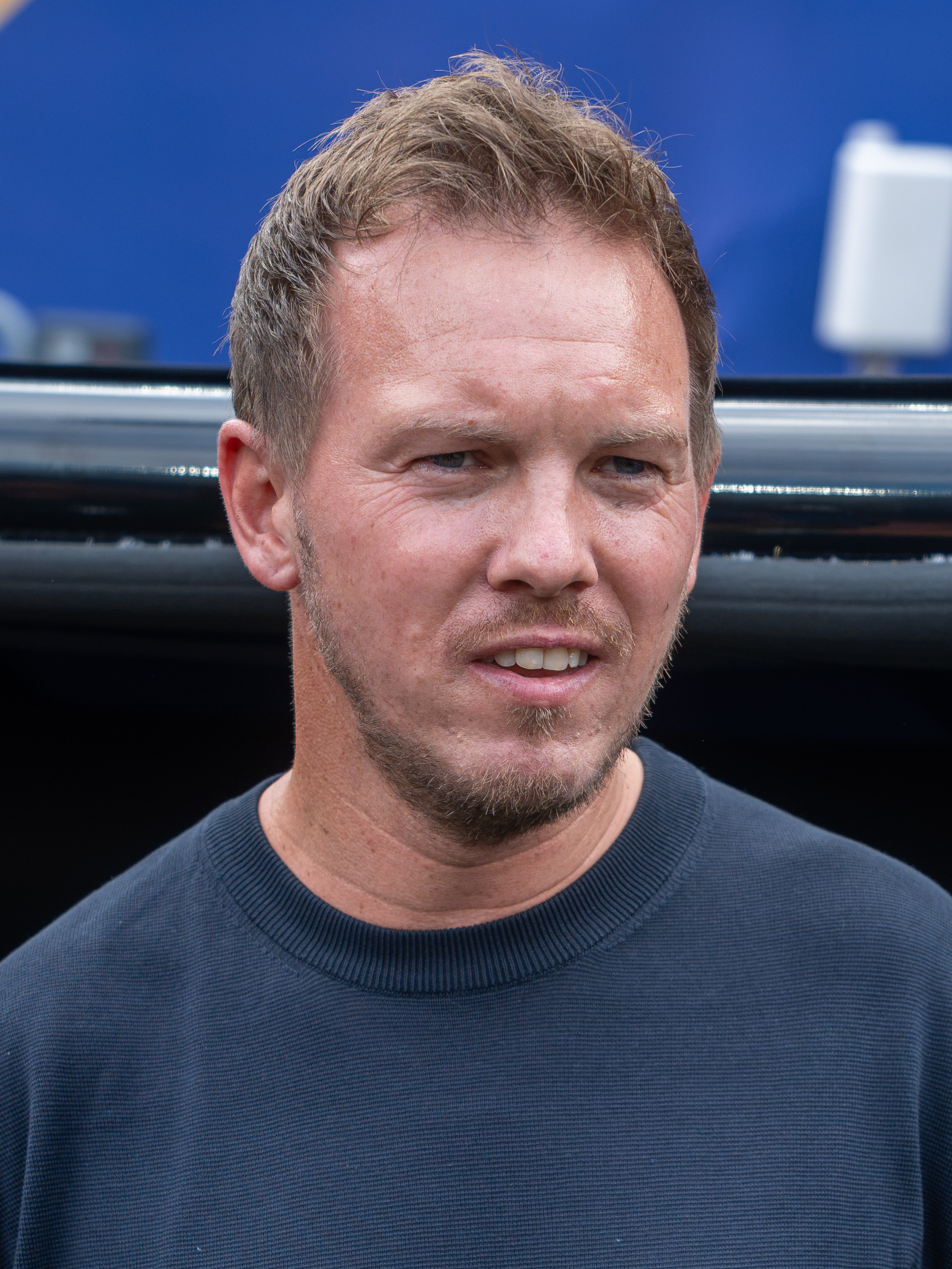
- Nagelsmann in 2026

Personal information
- Full name: Julian Nagelsmann
- Date of birth: 23 July 1987 (age 39)
- Place of birth: Landsberg am Lech, West Germany
- Height: 1.89 m (6 ft 2 in)
- Position: Centre-back

Youth career
- 1990–1999: FC Issing
- 1999–2002: FC Augsburg
- 2002–2006: 1860 Munich

Senior career*
Years	Team	Apps	(Gls)
2006–2007	1860 Munich II	0	(0)
2007–2008	FC Augsburg II	4	(0)
2010–2013	FC Issing		

Managerial career
- 2016–2019: TSG Hoffenheim
- 2019–2021: RB Leipzig
- 2021–2023: Bayern Munich
- 2023–2026: Germany
- * Club domestic league appearances and goals

Julian Nagelsmann (born 23 July 1987) is a German professional football coach who was most recently the manager of the Germany national team. He previously managed TSG Hoffenheim, RB Leipzig and Bayern Munich in the Bundesliga.

Born in Bavaria, Nagelsmann's playing career was limited by injuries, and he did not make a senior professional appearance. He began his coaching career in TSG Hoffenheim's youth setup in 2010 and was appointed head coach in 2015, taking over the following year. His best finish there was third place in the Bundesliga.

Nagelsmann joined RB Leipzig in 2019, where the club reached the semi-finals of the 2019–20 UEFA Champions League, but he departed after two seasons, having lost the 2021 DFB-Pokal Final. In 2021, he was appointed head coach of Bayern Munich, where he won the 2021–22 Bundesliga extending the club's run to a tenth consecutive championship, and two DFL-Supercup titles before being dismissed in March 2023, midway through his second season; reporting attributed the decision to inconsistent results.

In September 2023, Nagelsmann was appointed coach of the Germany national team, which was eliminated in the quarter-finals of Euro 2024 on home soil. He stepped down in July 2026 after Germany were eliminated in the round of 32 of the 2026 FIFA World Cup by Paraguay, the nation's first penalty-shootout defeat in World Cup history.

== Early life ==
Nagelsmann was born on 23 July 1987 in Landsberg am Lech, Bavaria. He played for FC Augsburg and 1860 Munich at youth level, and was the captain of TSV 1860 Munich's U19 team. In the 2006–07 season, he was part of the second team but made no appearances due to injuries. Nagelsmann returned to Augsburg for the 2007–08 season coached by Thomas Tuchel, playing with the second team, but injured his knee and meniscus for the second time, damaging the cartilage. As a result, he ended his professional playing career at the age of 20.

Nagelsmann had already assisted Tuchel as a scout in the first half of 2008. He studied business administration for four semesters before transferring to sports science. He then focused on coaching, returning to 1860 Munich as an assistant to Alexander Schmidt for the club's U17 team from 2008 to 2010. He later made a brief return to lower-level football with FC Issing while working at Hoffenheim.

== Coaching career ==
=== Early career ===
Nagelsmann joined TSG Hoffenheim's youth academy in 2010 and coached several youth teams in the following years. He was an assistant coach during Hoffenheim's 2012–13 season, and up until 11 February 2016, was coaching the club's U19 team. He coached Hoffenheim's U19 "junior team" to win the 2013–14 Under 19 Bundesliga title.

=== TSG Hoffenheim ===
Nagelsmann was appointed head coach of TSG Hoffenheim on 27 October 2015, initially to take over from the 2016–17 season. After Huub Stevens resigned for health reasons in February 2016, Nagelsmann assumed the role earlier than planned. At 28, he became the youngest head coach in Bundesliga history.

Hoffenheim were 17th in the Bundesliga when Nagelsmann took charge. The club avoided relegation after winning seven of its final fourteen league matches and finishing one point above the relegation play-off place. In the 2016–17 season, Hoffenheim finished fourth and qualified for the Champions League qualifying round.

Hoffenheim extended Nagelsmann's contract until 2021 in June 2017. In the 2017–18 season, Hoffenheim lost to Liverpool in the Champions League play-off round and finished last in their Europa League group. Hoffenheim finished third in 2017–18 and qualified directly for the Champions League group stage. In the 2018–19 Champions League, Hoffenheim finished last in their group with three draws and three defeats.

=== RB Leipzig ===
On 21 June 2018, RB Leipzig announced that Nagelsmann would become their head coach from the 2019–20 season on a four-year contract.

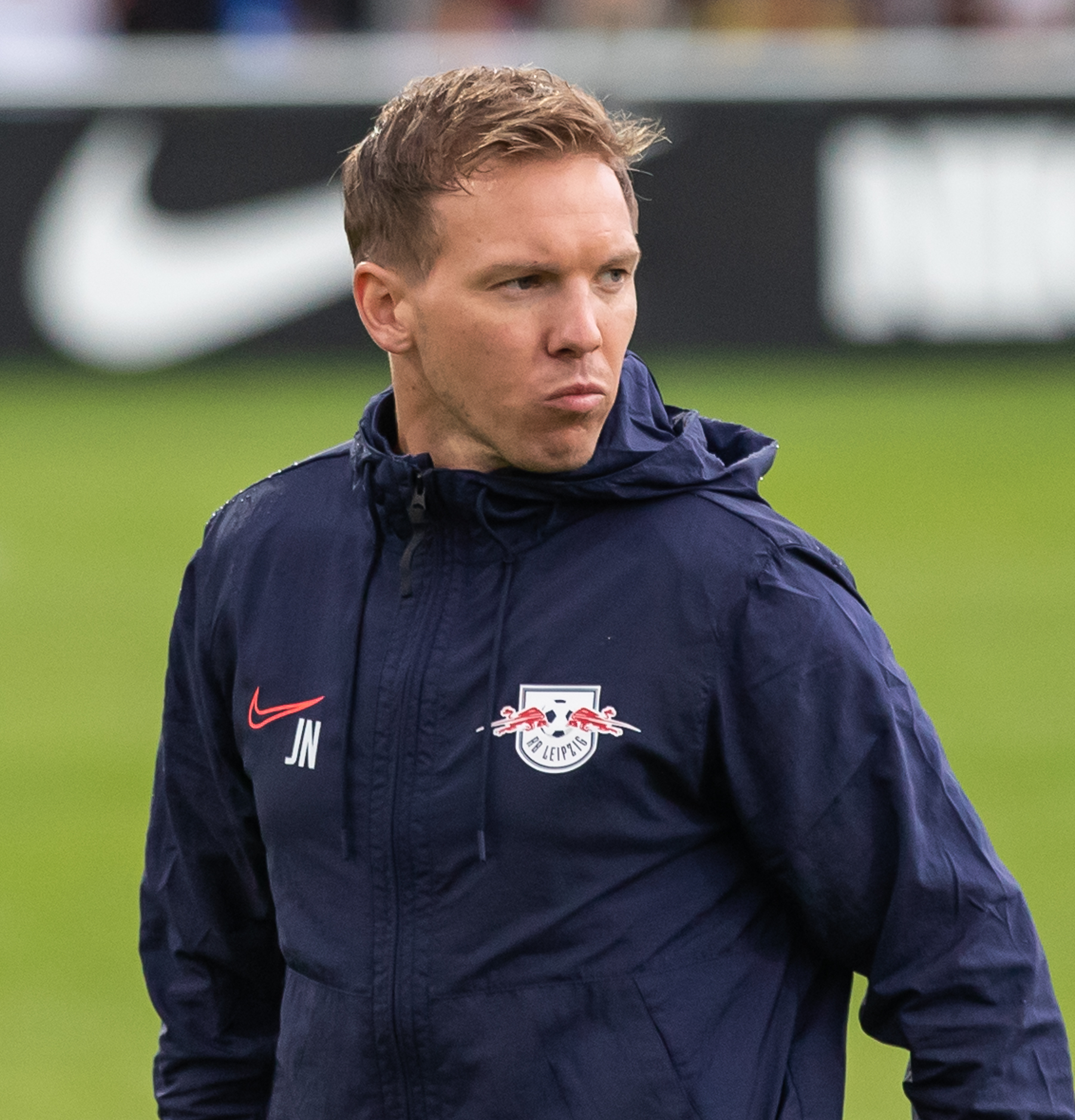
Nagelsmann coaching RB Leipzig in 2019

In his first season, Leipzig finished third in the Bundesliga and reached the semi-finals of the 2019–20 UEFA Champions League. They topped their group and defeated Tottenham Hotspur in the round of 16 and Atlético Madrid in the quarter-finals before losing 3–0 to Paris Saint-Germain in the semi-finals. The knockout rounds from the quarter-finals onward were played as single-leg ties at neutral venues because of the COVID-19 pandemic.

In the 2020–21 season, Leipzig finished second in the Bundesliga, reached the Champions League round of 16, and lost the DFB-Pokal final 4–1 to Borussia Dortmund. Nagelsmann left Leipzig after two seasons without a major trophy.

=== Bayern Munich ===
On 27 April 2021, Bayern Munich appointed Nagelsmann as head coach on a five-year contract, effective from 1 July 2021, replacing Hansi Flick. Bayern reportedly paid a managerial transfer fee of €25 million to release him from his RB Leipzig contract.

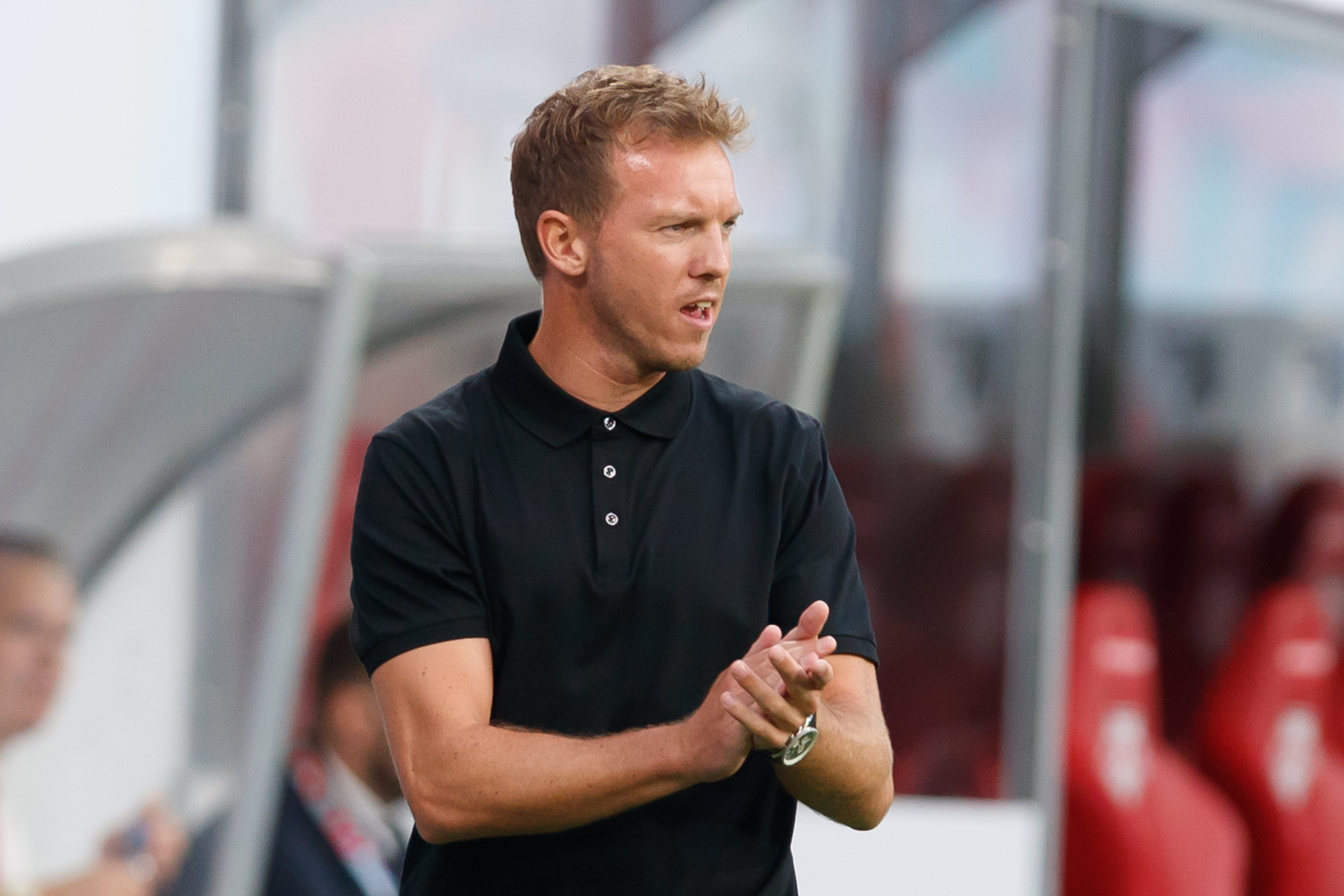
Nagelsmann with Bayern Munich in July 2022

In his first season, Bayern won the 2021 DFL-Supercup and the 2021–22 Bundesliga, securing the league title with three matches remaining. The season also included a 5–0 defeat to Borussia Mönchengladbach in the second round of the DFB-Pokal and a Champions League quarter-final elimination against Villarreal. At the start of the following season, Bayern won the 2022 DFL-Supercup and later reached the Champions League quarter-finals after winning all six group-stage matches and defeating Paris Saint-Germain in the round of 16.

During the 2022–23 season, reports described tensions between Nagelsmann and parts of the Bayern squad. In January 2023, the club dismissed goalkeeping coach Toni Tapalović, a close associate of captain Manuel Neuer. Neuer publicly criticised the decision, while Bayern executives and Nagelsmann criticised Neuer's comments. The Athletic reported that some players had raised concerns about his communication, frequent tactical changes and approach to training. The Athletic also reported that Nagelsmann's relationship with Bild reporter Lena Wurzenberger, who had previously covered Bayern, had contributed to concerns over trust within the squad.

On 24 March 2023, Bayern dismissed Nagelsmann and appointed Thomas Tuchel as his successor, with the club one point behind Borussia Dortmund in the Bundesliga. Bayern CEO Oliver Kahn said the decision was prompted by fluctuations in performance and that the team had played "less successfully and less attractively" since the 2022 FIFA World Cup.

=== Germany ===
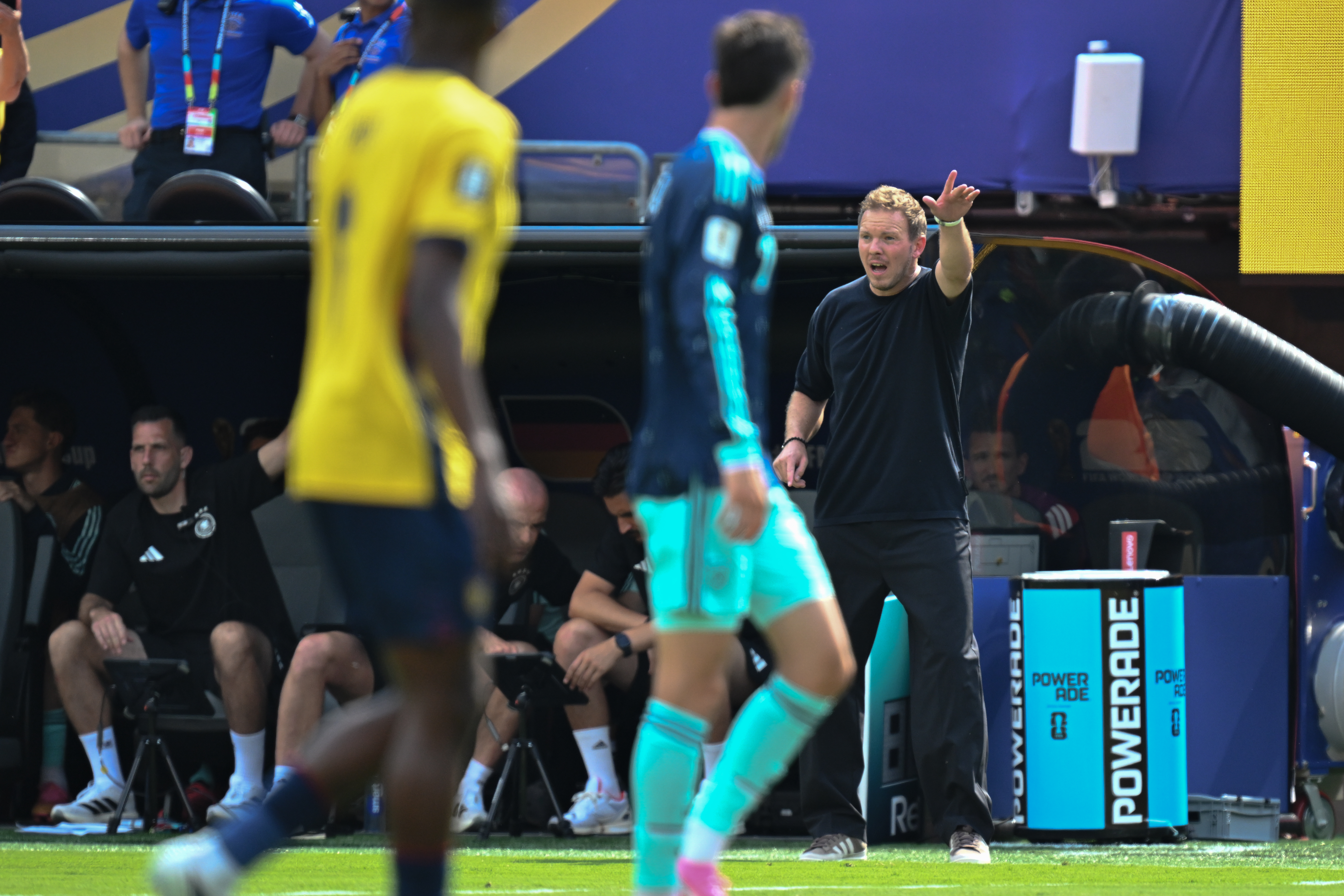
Nagelsmann coaching Germany at the 2026 FIFA World Cup

On 22 September 2023, Nagelsmann was appointed head coach of the Germany national team, replacing Hansi Flick, on a contract running until after UEFA Euro 2024, which Germany hosted. In April 2024, his contract was extended until the 2026 FIFA World Cup, and in January 2025 it was extended again until UEFA Euro 2028.

Nagelsmann began his tenure with a 3–1 comeback win over the United States, but won only one of his first four matches in charge, drawing with Mexico and losing November 2023 friendlies to Turkey (2–3) and Austria (0–2).

At UEFA Euro 2024, Germany won their group after matches against Scotland, Hungary and Switzerland. They defeated Denmark in the round of 16 before losing 2–1 after extra time to eventual champions Spain in the quarter-finals.

Nagelsmann later led Germany to the 2025 UEFA Nations League Finals. Germany finished top of their group but lost 2–1 to Portugal in the semi-finals.

At the 2026 FIFA World Cup, Germany topped their group but were eliminated by Paraguay in the round of 32, losing 4–3 on penalties after a 1–1 draw. It was Germany's first penalty-shootout defeat in World Cup history and first shootout defeat in a major tournament since the UEFA Euro 1976 final. Nagelsmann resigned on 3 July 2026.

== Style of management ==
Analysts have described Nagelsmann's teams as tactically flexible, with frequent changes of formation, possession-oriented play and aggressive pressing after turnovers, including the use of gegenpressing.

His use of rotation and frequent tactical changes was later cited as a source of friction at Bayern Munich, where some players reportedly raised concerns about his communication, tactical adjustments and approach to training. For example, his style of communication drew scrutiny in connection with Manuel Neuer's return to the national squad and Oliver Baumann's demotion before the 2026 FIFA World Cup.

== Personal life ==
In 2018, Nagelsmann married Verena. They have two children. The couple split in 2023, when he was reported to be in a relationship with Lena Wurzenberger, a sports reporter for Bild. After the relationship became public, Wurzenberger was reassigned from covering Bayern Munich to avoid a potential conflict of interest and later resigned from Bild.

Nagelsmann played ice hockey for EV Landsberg and SV Apfeldorf before focusing on football.

In 2017, Nagelsmann joined Common Goal, pledging one percent of his salary to football-based charitable projects.

== Managerial statistics ==
As of match played 29 June 2026

Managerial record by team, season and tenure
Team	Season	Record					Ref.
Team	Season	G	W	D	L	Win %	Ref.
TSG Hoffenheim	2015–16 (Note: Nagelsmann was appointed on 11 February 2016; the record covers the 14 matches from his appointment until the end of the season.)	14	7	2	5	50.00	
TSG Hoffenheim	2016–17	36	17	14	5	47.22	
TSG Hoffenheim	2017–18	44	17	12	15	38.64	
TSG Hoffenheim	2018–19	42	14	15	13	33.33	
TSG Hoffenheim total		136	55	43	38	40.44	
RB Leipzig	2019–20	47	26	14	7	55.32	
RB Leipzig	2020–21	48	28	8	12	58.33	
RB Leipzig total		95	54	22	19	56.84	
Bayern Munich	2021–22	47	33	7	7	70.21	
Bayern Munich	2022–23 (Note: Nagelsmann was dismissed on 24 March 2023; the record covers matches until his dismissal.)	37	27	7	3	72.97	
Bayern Munich total		84	60	14	10	71.43	
Germany	2023 (Note: Nagelsmann was appointed on 22 September 2023. Germany rows are broken down by calendar year.)	4	1	1	2	25.00	
Germany	2024	15	10	4	1	66.67	
Germany	2025	10	6	1	3	60.00	
Germany	2026 (Note: As of 29 June 2026. Matches decided by penalty shoot-out are counted as draws.)	8	6	1	1	75.00	
Germany total		37	23	7	7	62.16	
Career total		352	192	86	74	54.55	

== Honours ==
=== Manager ===
Bayern Munich

- Bundesliga: 2021–22
- DFL-Supercup: 2021, 2022

Individual

- VDV Coach of the Season (Germany): 2016–17
- German Football Manager of the Year: 2017
