= 2021 DFL-Supercup =

German Supercup
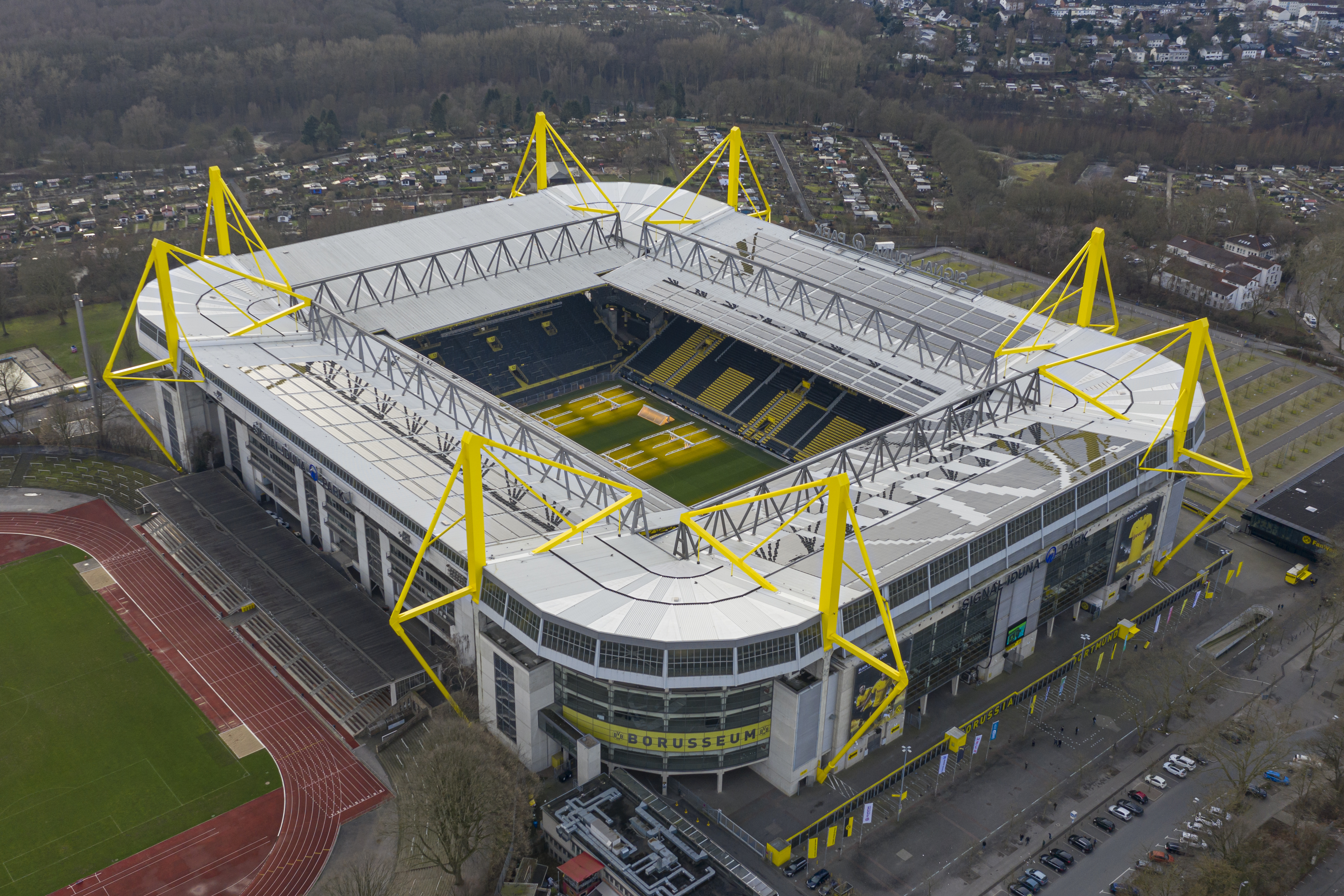
- Signal Iduna Park in Dortmund hosted the match.
- Event: DFL-Supercup
| Borussia Dortmund | Bayern Munich |
| 1 | 3 |
- Date: 17 August 2021
- Venue: Signal Iduna Park, Dortmund
- Man of the Match: Robert Lewandowski (Bayern Munich)
- Referee: Sascha Stegemann (Niederkassel)
- Attendance: 24,742

The 2021 DFL-Supercup was the 12th edition of the German super cup under the name DFL-Supercup, an annual football match contested by the winners of the previous season's Bundesliga and DFB-Pokal competitions. The match was played on 17 August 2021.

The match featured Borussia Dortmund, the winners of the 2020–21 DFB-Pokal, and Bayern Munich, the champions of the 2020–21 Bundesliga. The match was hosted by Borussia Dortmund at the Signal Iduna Park in Dortmund.

Bayern Munich were the defending champions, having won the 2020 edition 3–2 against Borussia Dortmund. Bayern won the match 3–1 for their 9th DFL-Supercup title.

== Teams ==
In the following table, matches until 1996 were in the DFB-Supercup era, since 2010 were in the DFL-Supercup era.

| Team | Qualification | Previous appearances (bold indicates winners) |
|---|---|---|
| Borussia Dortmund | 2020–21 DFB-Pokal winners | 11 (**1989**, **1995**, **1996**, 2011, 2012, **2013**, **2014**, 2016, 2017, **2019**, 2020) (Note: Winners of the unofficial 2008 German Supercup. One-time runners-up in the DFL-Ligapokal.) |
| Bayern Munich^{TH} | 2020–21 Bundesliga champions | 14 (**1987**, 1989, **1990**, 1994, **2010**, **2012**, 2013, 2014, 2015, **2016**, **2017**, **2018**, 2019, **2020**) (Note: Runners-up in the unofficial 2008 German Supercup. Six-time winners and one-time runners-up in the DFL-Ligapokal.) |

== Match ==
=== Summary ===
In the 41st minute, Serge Gnabry crossed from the left for Robert Lewandowski to put Bayern Munich ahead with a header from six yards out to the left of the net. Thomas Müller made it 2–0 in the 49th minute with a close range finish to the net after the ball had been played in from the left by Alphonso Davies and back-healed to him by Lewandowski. Marco Reus made it 2–1 in the 64th minute with a right foot finish from outside the penalty area to the top right corner of the net. Lewandowski scored his second in the 74th minute with a low finish to the right corner of the net from inside the penalty area after the ball broke to him after an error by Dortmund defender Manuel Akanji.

=== Details ===
17 August 2021
20:30 CEST

| Borussia Dortmund | 1–3 | Bayern Munich |
|---|---|---|
| Reus 64' | Report | Lewandowski 41', 74'; Müller 49' |

Signal Iduna Park, Dortmund
Attendance: 24,742
Referee: Sascha Stegemann (Niederkassel)

| **Borussia Dortmund** | **Bayern Munich** |

| GK | 1 | (Switzerland) Gregor Kobel |
| RB | 30 | (Germany) Felix Passlack | | (substituted off) 84' |
| CB | 28 | (Belgium) Axel Witsel |
| CB | 16 | (Switzerland) Manuel Akanji |
| LB | 14 | (Germany) Nico Schulz |
| DM | 8 | (Germany) Mahmoud Dahoud | (yellow card) 32' |
| CM | 22 | (England) Jude Bellingham | | (substituted off) 84' |
| CM | 7 | (United States) Giovanni Reyna | | (substituted off) 78' |
| AM | 11 | (Germany) Marco Reus (c) | (yellow card) 25' |
| CF | 9 | (Norway) Erling Haaland |
| CF | 18 | (Germany) Youssoufa Moukoko | | (substituted off) 58' |
Substitutes:
| GK | 35 | (Switzerland) Marwin Hitz |
| MF | 6 | (Denmark) Thomas Delaney |
| MF | 20 | (Brazil) Reinier | | (substituted on) 84' |
| MF | 39 | (Germany) Marius Wolf | | (substituted on) 84' |
| MF | 46 | (Croatia) Marco Pašalić | | (substituted on) 78' |
| MF | 47 | (Germany) Antonios Papadopoulos |
| FW | 21 | (Netherlands) Donyell Malen | | (substituted on) 58' |
| FW | 27 | (Germany) Steffen Tigges |
| FW | 36 | (Germany) Ansgar Knauff |
Manager:
(Germany) Marco Rose

| GK | 1 | (Germany) Manuel Neuer (c) |
| RB | 44 | (Germany) Josip Stanišić | | (substituted off) 87' |
| CB | 2 | (France) Dayot Upamecano |
| CB | 4 | (Germany) Niklas Süle | (yellow card) 23' |
| LB | 19 | (Canada) Alphonso Davies |
| CM | 6 | (Germany) Joshua Kimmich |
| CM | 8 | (Germany) Leon Goretzka |
| RW | 11 | (France) Kingsley Coman | | (substituted off) 49' |
| AM | 25 | (Germany) Thomas Müller | | (substituted off) 73' |
| LW | 7 | (Germany) Serge Gnabry | | (substituted off) 73' |
| CF | 9 | (Poland) Robert Lewandowski | | (substituted off) 88' |
Substitutes:
| GK | 26 | (Germany) Sven Ulreich |
| DF | 3 | (England) Omar Richards |
| DF | 15 | (United States) Chris Richards |
| DF | 20 | (Senegal) Bouna Sarr | | (substituted on) 87' |
| DF | 23 | (France) Tanguy Nianzou |
| MF | 24 | (France) Corentin Tolisso | | (substituted on) 73' |
| MF | 42 | (Germany) Jamal Musiala | | (substituted on) 73' |
| FW | 10 | (Germany) Leroy Sané | (yellow card) 83' | (substituted on) 49' |
| FW | 13 | (Cameroon) Eric Maxim Choupo-Moting | (yellow card) 90+3' | (substituted on) 88' |
Manager:
(Germany) Julian Nagelsmann

Man of the Match:
Robert Lewandowski (Bayern Munich)

Assistant referees:
Mike Pickel (Mendig)
Frederick Assmuth (Cologne)
Fourth official:
Florian Badstübner (Windsbach)
Video assistant referee:
Tobias Welz (Wiesbaden)
Assistant video assistant referee:
Robert Wessel (Berlin)

**Match rules**

- 90 minutes.
- Penalty shoot-out if scores level.
- Nine named substitutes, of which up to five may be used. (Note: Each team was given only three opportunities to make substitutions, excluding substitutions made at half-time.)

== See also ==
- 2021–22 Bundesliga
- 2021–22 DFB-Pokal
