= RSV Meinerzhagen =

German football club

- Full name: Rasensportverein Meinerzhagen 1921 e.V.
- Founded: 1921
- Ground: Stadion an der Oststraße
- Capacity: 3,000
- League: Westfalenliga
- 2022–23: 4th
- Website: https://www.rsv-meinerzhagen.com/

Rasensportverein Meinerzhagen 1921 e.V. is a German football club from Meinerzhagen in North Rhine-Westphalia. Founded in 1921, the team plays in the Westfalenliga in the sixth tier of the German football league system.

== History ==
The club was founded in 1921. The team rose from the Bezirksliga (district league) in the 1960s, reaching the Verbandsliga, which was then the third tier. Managed by former Borussia Dortmund and Germany national team player Erich Schanko, they missed out on promotion to the Regionalliga in 1965–66 by coming second.

Nuri Şahin, who began playing as a child for the club and later represented Dortmund and Real Madrid CF, began investing in the club in 2015 while still an active professional. In three years of his involvement, the team achieved two promotions from the Bezirksliga into the sixth-tier Westfalenliga, followed by a promotion to the Oberliga Westfalen in May 2019. The club won the Westphalian Cup for the first time on 22 August 2020, defeating SV Schermbeck 2–0 in the final. On 12 September, the club competed in the DFB-Pokal for the first time, losing 6–1 after extra time to SpVgg Greuther Fürth of the 2. Bundesliga in the first round.

In April 2021, with the Oberliga season having been abandoned due to the COVID-19 pandemic, RSV Meinerzhagen withdrew from the division for financial reasons. In the previous season, the team had been in second when the season was abandoned for the same reason, but missed out on promotion by average points per game to Rot Weiss Ahlen, who had two games in hand.

== Honours ==
- Westphalian Cup: 2019–20
