= 2023–24 RB Leipzig season =

RB Leipzig
2023–24 season
- Owner: Red Bull GmbH
- CEO: Oliver Mintzlaff
- Head coach: Marco Rose
- Stadium: Red Bull Arena
- Bundesliga: 4th
- DFB-Pokal: Second round
- DFL-Supercup: Winners
- UEFA Champions League: Round of 16
- Top goalscorer: League: Loïs Openda (24); All: Loïs Openda (28)
- Average home league attendance: 44,634
| Home colours | Away colours |

The 2023–24 season was the 15th season in the history of RB Leipzig and their eighth consecutive season in the top flight. The club participated in the Bundesliga, DFB-Pokal, DFL-Supercup and UEFA Champions League.

== Players ==
=== First-team squad ===
As of 9 January 2024

Note: Flags indicate national team as defined under FIFA eligibility rules; some limited exceptions apply. Players may hold more than one non-FIFA nationality.

| No. | Pos. | Nation | Player |
|---|---|---|---|
| 1 | GK | HUN | Péter Gulácsi (captain) |
| 2 | DF | FRA | Mohamed Simakan |
| 3 | DF | GER | Christopher Lenz |
| 4 | DF | HUN | Willi Orbán (vice-captain) |
| 5 | DF | FRA | El Chadaille Bitshiabu |
| 6 | MF | MKD | Eljif Elmas |
| 7 | MF | ESP | Dani Olmo |
| 8 | MF | MLI | Amadou Haidara |
| 9 | FW | DEN | Yussuf Poulsen (3rd captain) |
| 13 | MF | AUT | Nicolas Seiwald |
| 14 | MF | AUT | Christoph Baumgartner |
| 16 | DF | GER | Lukas Klostermann |

| No. | Pos. | Nation | Player |
|---|---|---|---|
| 17 | FW | BEL | Loïs Openda |
| 20 | FW | NED | Xavi Simons (on loan from Paris Saint-Germain) |
| 21 | GK | GER | Janis Blaswich |
| 22 | DF | GER | David Raum |
| 23 | DF | FRA | Castello Lukeba |
| 24 | MF | AUT | Xaver Schlager |
| 25 | GK | GER | Leopold Zingerle |
| 29 | GK | GER | Oskar Preil |
| 30 | FW | SLO | Benjamin Šeško |
| 36 | GK | GER | Timo Schlieck |
| 39 | DF | GER | Benjamin Henrichs |
| 44 | MF | SLO | Kevin Kampl (4th captain) |

=== Players out on loan ===
Note: Flags indicate national team as defined under FIFA eligibility rules; some limited exceptions apply. Players may hold more than one non-FIFA nationality.

| No. | Pos. | Nation | Player |
|---|---|---|---|
| — | DF | ESP | Angeliño (at Roma until 30 June 2024) |
| — | DF | GER | Sanoussy Ba (at LASK until 30 June 2024) |
| — | MF | GER | Fabrice Hartmann (at Sligo Rovers until 30 June 2024) |
| — | DF | GER | Frederik Jäkel (at SV Elversberg until 30 June 2024) |
| — | MF | GUI | Ilaix Moriba (at Getafe until 30 June 2024) |

| No. | Pos. | Nation | Player |
|---|---|---|---|
| — | FW | ESP | Hugo Novoa (at Villarreal B until 30 June 2024) |
| — | GK | GER | Tim Schreiber (at 1. FC Saarbrücken until 30 June 2024) |
| — | FW | POR | André Silva (at Real Sociedad until 30 June 2024) |
| — | FW | GER | Timo Werner (at Tottenham Hotspur until 30 June 2024) |

== Transfers ==
=== In ===
| No. | Pos. | Player | Transferred from | Fee | Date | Source |
|---|---|---|---|---|---|---|
| 13 | MF | (Austria) Nicolas Seiwald | (Austria) Red Bull Salzburg | €20,000,000 | 1 July 2023 | |
| 14 | MF | (Austria) Christoph Baumgartner | (Germany) 1899 Hoffenheim | €24,000,000 | 1 July 2023 | |
| 18 | MF | (Portugal) Fábio Carvalho | (England) Liverpool | Loan | 1 July 2023 | |
| 25 | GK | (Germany) Leopold Zingerle | (Germany) SC Paderborn | Free | 1 July 2023 | |
| 30 | FW | (Slovenia) Benjamin Šeško | (Austria) Red Bull Salzburg | €24,000,000 | 1 July 2023 | |
| 17 | FW | (Belgium) Loïs Openda | (France) Lens | €43,000,000 | 14 July 2023 | |
| 5 | DF | (France) El Chadaille Bitshiabu | (France) Paris Saint-Germain | €15,000,000 | 18 July 2023 | |
| 20 | FW | (Netherlands) Xavi Simons | (France) Paris Saint-Germain | Loan | 19 July 2023 | |
| 23 | DF | (France) Castello Lukeba | (France) Lyon | €30,000,000 | 11 August 2023 | |
| 3 | DF | (Germany) Christopher Lenz | (Germany) Eintracht Frankfurt | €1,000,000 | 30 August 2023 | |
| 6 | MF | (North Macedonia) Eljif Elmas | (Italy) Napoli | €25,000,000 | 1 January 2024 | |

=== Out ===
| No. | Pos. | Player | Transferred to | Fee | Date | Source |
|---|---|---|---|---|---|---|
| 13 | GK | (Norway) Ørjan Nyland | (Spain) Sevilla | Free | 1 July 2023 | |
| 18 | FW | (France) Christopher Nkunku | (England) Chelsea | €60,000,000 | 1 July 2023 | |
| 25 | DF | (Germany) Sanoussy Ba | (Austria) LASK | Loan | 1 July 2023 | |
| 27 | MF | (Austria) Konrad Laimer | (Germany) Bayern Munich | Free | 1 July 2023 | |
| 33 | GK | (Spain) Josep Martínez | (Italy) Genoa | €3,500,000 | 1 July 2023 | |
| 17 | MF | (Hungary) Dominik Szoboszlai | (England) Liverpool | €70,000,000 | 2 July 2023 | |
| 3 | DF | (Spain) Angeliño | (Turkey) Galatasaray | Loan | 13 July 2023 | |
| 53 | MF | (Germany) Tom Krauß | (Germany) Mainz 05 | €5,000,000 | 14 July 2023 | |
| 45 | FW | (Germany) Mehmet Ibrahimi | (Austria) Blau-Weiß Linz | Undisclosed | 18 July 2023 | |
| 23 | DF | (Germany) Marcel Halstenberg | (Germany) Hannover 96 | €700,000 | 19 July 2023 | |
| 35 | FW | (Norway) Alexander Sørloth | (Spain) Villarreal | €10,000,000 | 25 July 2023 | |
| | MF | (Germany) Fabrice Hartmann | (Republic of Ireland) Sligo Rovers | Loan | 29 July 2023 | |
| 37 | DF | (Germany) Frederik Jäkel | (Germany) SV Elversberg | Loan | 1 August 2023 | |
| 19 | FW | (Portugal) André Silva | (Spain) Real Sociedad | Loan | 2 August 2023 | |
| 32 | DF | (Croatia) Joško Gvardiol | (England) Manchester City | €90,000,000 | 5 August 2023 | |
| 28 | MF | (United States) Caden Clark | (Denmark) Vendsyssel FF | Loan | 1 September 2023 | |
| 38 | FW | (Spain) Hugo Novoa | (Netherlands) FC Utrecht | Loan | 1 September 2023 | |
| 10 | MF | (Sweden) Emil Forsberg | (United States) New York Red Bulls | Undisclosed | 1 January 2024 | |
| 28 | MF | (United States) Caden Clark | (United States) Minnesota United | Undisclosed | 1 January 2024 | |
| 26 | MF | (Guinea) Ilaix Moriba | (Spain) Getafe | Loan | 8 January 2024 | |
| 11 | FW | (Germany) Timo Werner | (England) Tottenham Hotspur | Loan | 9 January 2024 | |
| 3 | DF | (Spain) Angeliño | (Italy) Roma | Loan | 30 January 2024 | |
| 38 | FW | (Spain) Hugo Novoa | (Spain) Villarreal B | Loan | 30 January 2024 | |

== Pre-season and friendlies ==
Win Draw Loss Fixtures

| 18 July 2023 Friendly | RB Leipzig | 7–0 | FC Grimma | Leipzig |
| 18:30 CEST (UTC+2) | Carvalho 14'; Šeško 23', 26', 36'; Bartsch 38' (o.g.); Neumann 60'; Osawe 88' | Report | | Stadium: RB-Training Center Cottaweg; Attendance: 0 Referee: Johannes Schipke |

| 25 July 2023 Friendly | RB Leipzig | 1–2 | Udinese | Lienz, Austria |
| 18:00 CEST (UTC+2) | Köhler (yellow card) 23'; Openda 66' | Report | Samardžić 30'; Semedo 83' | Stadium: Dolomitenstadion; Attendance: 2,550; Referee: Marco Schlacher (Austria) |

| 28 July 2023 Innsbruck Cup | Ipswich Town | 1–0 | RB Leipzig | Innsbruck, Austria |
| 14:30 CEST (UTC+2) | Hirst 51'; Morsy (yellow card) 57' | Report | | Stadium: Tivoli Stadion Tirol; Attendance: 2,200; Referee: Olcay Bingöl (Austria) |
Note: Match was played with two thirty-minute halves.

| 28 July 2023 Innsbruck Cup | RB Leipzig | 0–0 | Werder Bremen | Innsbruck, Austria |
| 15:45 CEST (UTC+2) | Simons (yellow card) 28' | Report | | Stadium: Tivoli Stadion Tirol; Attendance: 2,200; Referee: Olcay Bingöl (Austria) |
Note: Match was played with two thirty-minute halves.

| 5 August 2023 Friendly | RB Leipzig | 3–0 | Las Palmas | Leipzig |
| 13:30 CEST (UTC+2) | Openda 23', 35'; Šeško 54' | Report | Suárez (yellow card) 60'; S. Cardona (yellow card) 63'; Sinkgraven (yellow card) 64'; M. Cardona (yellow card) 85' | Stadium: Red Bull Arena; Attendance: 15,134; Referee: Alexander Sather (Germany) |

== Competitions ==
=== Overall record ===
| Competition | First match | Last match | Starting round | Final position | Record | | | | | | | |
| Competition | First match | Last match | Starting round | Final position | Pld | W | D | L | GF | GA | GD | Win % |
|---|---|---|---|---|---|---|---|---|---|---|---|---|
| Bundesliga | 19 August 2023 | 18 May 2024 | Matchday 1 | 4th | 34 | 19 | 8 | 7 | 77 | 39 | +38 | 55.88 |
| DFB-Pokal | 27 September 2023 | 31 October 2023 | First round | Second round | 2 | 1 | 0 | 1 | 3 | 3 | +0 | 50.00 |
| DFL-Supercup | 12 August 2023 | | Final | Winners | 1 | 1 | 0 | 0 | 3 | 0 | +3 | 100.00 |
| UEFA Champions League | 19 September 2023 | 6 March 2024 | Group stage | Round of 16 | 8 | 4 | 1 | 3 | 14 | 12 | +2 | 50.00 |
| Total | | | | | 45 | 25 | 9 | 11 | 97 | 54 | +43 | 55.56 |

Source: Soccerway

=== Bundesliga ===
==== League table ====
| Pos | Team | Pld | W | D | L | GF | GA | GD | Pts | Qualification or relegation |
|---|---|---|---|---|---|---|---|---|---|---|
| 2 | VfB Stuttgart | 34 | 23 | 4 | 7 | 78 | 39 | +39 | 73 | Qualification for the Champions League league phase (Note: The Bundesliga gained an additional Champions League place as a result of Germany finishing as one of the two associations with the highest UEFA coefficient points in 2023–24.) |
| 3 | Bayern Munich | 34 | 23 | 3 | 8 | 94 | 45 | +49 | 72 | Qualification for the Champions League league phase |
| 4 | RB Leipzig | 34 | 19 | 8 | 7 | 77 | 39 | +38 | 65 | Qualification for the Champions League league phase |
| 5 | Borussia Dortmund | 34 | 18 | 9 | 7 | 68 | 43 | +25 | 63 | Qualification for the Champions League league phase |
| 6 | Eintracht Frankfurt | 34 | 11 | 14 | 9 | 51 | 50 | +1 | 47 | Qualification for the Europa League league phase (Note: Since the 2023–24 DFB-Pokal winners, Bayer Leverkusen, qualified for the Champions League via league position, the spot reserved for the DFB-Pokal winners (Europa League league phase) was passed to the seventh-placed team, and the Conference League play-off round spot was passed to the eighth-placed team.) |

Source: DFB
Rules for classification: 1) Points; 2) Goal difference; 3) Goals scored; 4) Head-to-head results; 5) Head-to-head away goals scored; 6) Away goals scored; 7) Play-off.

==== Results summary ====
| Overall | | | | | | | | Home | | | | | | Away | | | | | |
| Pld | W | D | L | GF | GA | GD | Pts | W | D | L | GF | GA | GD | W | D | L | GF | GA | GD |
|---|---|---|---|---|---|---|---|---|---|---|---|---|---|---|---|---|---|---|---|
| 34 | 19 | 8 | 7 | 77 | 39 | +38 | 65 | 11 | 4 | 2 | 40 | 12 | +28 | 8 | 4 | 5 | 37 | 27 | +10 |

Source: DFB

==== Results by round ====
| Round | 1 | 2 | 3 | 4 | 5 | 6 | 7 | 8 | 9 | 10 | 11 | 12 | 13 | 14 | 15 | 16 | 17 | 18 | 19 | 20 | 21 | 22 | 23 | 24 | 25 | 26 | 27 | 28 | 29 | 30 | 31 | 32 | 33 | 34 |
|---|---|---|---|---|---|---|---|---|---|---|---|---|---|---|---|---|---|---|---|---|---|---|---|---|---|---|---|---|---|---|---|---|---|---|
| Ground | A | H | A | H | A | H | H | A | H | A | H | A | H | A | H | A | H | H | A | H | A | H | A | A | H | A | H | A | H | A | H | A | H | A |
| Result | L | W | W | W | W | D | D | W | W | L | W | L | W | W | W | D | L | L | L | W | D | W | L | W | W | W | D | W | W | W | W | D | D | D |
| Position | 11 | 8 | 4 | 3 | 4 | 5 | 6 | 5 | 5 | 5 | 4 | 5 | 4 | 4 | 3 | 4 | 4 | 4 | 5 | 5 | 5 | 5 | 5 | 5 | 5 | 5 | 5 | 4 | 4 | 4 | 4 | 4 | 4 | 4 |

Source: DFB
A = Away; H = Home; W = Win; D = Draw; L = Loss

==== Matches ====
The league fixtures were announced on 30 June 2023.

| 19 August 2023 1 | Bayer Leverkusen | 3–2 | RB Leipzig | Leverkusen |
| 15:30 CEST (UTC+2) | Frimpong 24'; Tah 35'; Wirtz 64'; Boniface (yellow card) 69' | Report | Olmo 39'; Seiwald (yellow card) 62'; Openda 71'; Lukeba (yellow card) 81' | Stadium: BayArena; Attendance: 29,464; Referee: Felix Brych |

| 25 August 2023 2 | RB Leipzig | 5–1 | VfB Stuttgart | Leipzig |
| 20:30 CEST (UTC+2) | Henrichs 51'; Schlager (yellow card) 61'; Olmo 63'; Openda 66'; Kampl 74'; Simons 76' | Report | Guirassy 35'; Egloff (yellow card) 65' | Stadium: Red Bull Arena; Attendance: 46,084; Referee: Frank Willenborg |

| 3 September 2023 3 | Union Berlin | 0–3 | RB Leipzig | Berlin |
| 17:30 CEST (UTC+2) | Král (yellow card) 27'; Volland (red card) 64'; Gosens (yellow card) 81'; Haberer (yellow card) 81' | Report | Henrichs (yellow card) 26'; Simons 51'; Šeško 85', 87' | Stadium: Stadion An der Alten Försterei; Attendance: 22,012; Referee: Daniel Schlager |

| 16 September 2023 4 | RB Leipzig | 3–0 | FC Augsburg | Leipzig |
| 15:30 CEST (UTC+2) | Simons 6'; Openda 11'; Raum 27' | Report | | Stadium: Red Bull Arena; Attendance: 44,746; Referee: Sascha Stegemann |

| 23 September 2023 5 | Borussia Mönchengladbach | 0–1 | RB Leipzig | Mönchengladbach |
| 15:30 CEST (UTC+2) | Scally (yellow card) 65' | Report | Werner 75' | Stadium: Borussia-Park; Attendance: 50,122; Referee: Robert Schröder |

| 30 September 2023 6 | RB Leipzig | 2–2 | Bayern Munich | Leipzig |
| 18:30 CEST (UTC+2) | Openda 20'; Lukeba 26', (yellow card) 65'; Simakan (yellow card) 54' | Report | Kane (yellow card) 37', (goal) 57' (pen.); Ulreich (yellow card) 44'; Upamecano (yellow card) 51'; Sané 70'; Musiala (yellow card) 72'; Tel (yellow card) 81' | Stadium: Red Bull Arena; Attendance: 47,069; Referee: Marco Fritz |

| 7 October 2023 7 | RB Leipzig | 0–0 | VfL Bochum | Leipzig |
| 15:30 CEST (UTC+2) | Simons (penalty missed) 27', (yellow card) 69'; Baumgartner (yellow card) 47'; Forsberg (penalty missed) 61' | Report | Osterhage (yellow card) 42'; Ordets (yellow card) 55'; Stöger (yellow card) 60'; Schlotterbeck (yellow card) 87' | Stadium: Red Bull Arena; Attendance: 44,269; Referee: Timo Gerach |

| 21 October 2023 8 | Darmstadt 98 | 1–3 | RB Leipzig | Darmstadt |
| 15:30 CEST (UTC+2) | Kempe 32' (pen.); Holland (yellow card) 47'; Klarer (yellow card) 49'; Nürnberger (yellow card) 60'; Skarke (yellow card) 67'; Maglica (yellow card) 68'; Müller (yellow card) 71' | Report | Openda 1', 72', (yellow card) 68'; Forsberg 24'; Raum (yellow card) 63'; Kampl (yellow card) 79' | Stadium: Merck-Stadion am Böllenfalltor; Attendance: 17,810; Referee: Harm Osmers |

| 28 October 2023 9 | RB Leipzig | 6–0 | 1. FC Köln | Leipzig |
| 18:30 CEST (UTC+2) | Werner 15' (pen.); Simakan (yellow card) 19'; Openda 40', 45+3'; Raum 43'; Klostermann (yellow card) 79'; Šeško 88'; Baumgartner 90+1' | Report | Chabot (yellow card) 29'; Olesen (yellow card) 72' (yellow-red card) 80'; Kilian (yellow card) 85' | Stadium: Red Bull Arena; Attendance: 46,480; Referee: Benjamin Brand |

| 4 November 2023 10 | Mainz 05 | 2–0 | RB Leipzig | Mainz |
| 15:30 CET (UTC+1) | Caci (yellow card) 39'; Lee 76'; Barreiro 80'; Barkok (yellow card) 88'; Van den Berg (yellow card) 90' | Report | Klostermann (yellow card) 51' | Stadium: Opel Arena; Attendance: 30,100; Referee: Bastian Dankert |

| 12 November 2023 11 | RB Leipzig | 3–1 | SC Freiburg | Leipzig |
| 19:30 CET (UTC+1) | Simons 6'; Haidara (yellow card) 62'; Openda (yellow card) 63', (goal) 79' (pen.); Baumgartner 80' | Report | Röhl 45+6' | Stadium: Red Bull Arena; Attendance: 41,117; Referee: Patrick Ittrich |

| 25 November 2023 12 | VfL Wolfsburg | 2–1 | RB Leipzig | Wolfsburg |
| 15:30 CET (UTC+1) | Wind 9'; Svanberg (yellow card) 35'; Zesiger (yellow card) 45+4'; Lacroix (yellow card) 59'; Rogério 66'; Casteels (yellow card) 90+2' | Report | Openda (yellow card) 33'; Poulsen 52'; Simons (yellow card) 79' | Stadium: Volkswagen Arena; Attendance: 25,350; Referee: Robert Hartmann |

| 2 December 2023 13 | RB Leipzig | 2–1 | 1. FC Heidenheim | Leipzig |
| 15:30 CET (UTC+1) | Openda 29' (pen.); Poulsen 44'; Simakan (yellow card) 60'; Baumgartner (yellow card) 88' | Report | Gimber 45+2', (yellow card) 88'; Pieringer (yellow card) 86' | Stadium: Red Bull Arena; Attendance: 40,000; Referee: Christian Dingert |

| 9 December 2023 14 | Borussia Dortmund | 2–3 | RB Leipzig | Dortmund |
| 18:30 CET (UTC+1) | Hummels (red card) 15'; Süle 45+6'; Özcan (yellow card) 60'; Füllkrug 90+3' | Report | Bensebaini 32' (o.g.); Simakan (yellow card) 35'; Baumgartner 54'; Simons (yellow card) 61'; Openda (yellow card) 66'; Poulsen 90+1' | Stadium: Signal Iduna Park; Attendance: 81,365; Referee: Sven Jablonski |

| 16 December 2023 15 | RB Leipzig | 3–1 | 1899 Hoffenheim | Leipzig |
| 18:30 CET (UTC+1) | Klostermann 34', (yellow card) 80'; Haidara (yellow card) 40'; Simons (yellow card) 62'; Forsberg 70'; Simakan 74' | Report | Kabak 42', (yellow card) 62'; Grillitsch (yellow card) 90+4' | Stadium: Red Bull Arena; Attendance: 42,946; Referee: Robert Schröder |

| 19 December 2023 16 | Werder Bremen | 1–1 | RB Leipzig | Bremen |
| 18:30 CET (UTC+1) | Groß (yellow card) 59'; Bittencourt (yellow card) 66'; Njinmah 75', (yellow card) 84'; Ducksch (yellow card) 90+1' | Report | Openda 47'; Kampl (yellow card) 69'; Haidara (yellow card) 90+1' | Stadium: Weser-Stadion; Attendance: 41,000; Referee: Tobias Reichel |

| 13 January 2024 17 | RB Leipzig | 0–1 | Eintracht Frankfurt | Leipzig |
| 14:30 CET (UTC+1) | | Report | Knauff 7'; Dina Ebimbe (yellow card) 41'; Larsson (yellow card) 90+4' | Stadium: Red Bull Arena; Attendance: 45,867; Referee: Frank Willenborg |

| 20 January 2024 18 | RB Leipzig | 2–3 | Bayer Leverkusen | Leipzig |
| 18:30 CET (UTC+1) | Simons 7', (yellow card) 71'; Openda 56'; Schlager (yellow card) 87' | Report | Tah (yellow card) 12', (goal) 63'; Stanišić (yellow card) 38'; Tella 47'; Wirtz (yellow card) 66'; Hincapié 90+1' | Stadium: Red Bull Arena; Attendance: 46,529; Referee: Matthias Jöllenbeck |

| 27 January 2024 19 | VfB Stuttgart | 5–2 | RB Leipzig | Stuttgart |
| 15:30 CET (UTC+1) | Millot 25' (pen.); Undav 30', 56', 75'; Leweling 48'; Anton (yellow card) 69' | Report | Schlager (yellow card) 5'; Simakan (yellow card) 16'; Šeško 32'; Baumgartner (yellow card) 43'; Openda 55'; Raum (yellow card) 79' | Stadium: MHPArena; Attendance: 52,100; Referee: Sven Jablonski |

| 4 February 2024 20 | RB Leipzig | 2–0 | Union Berlin | Leipzig |
| 17:30 CET (UTC+1) | Openda 11'; Kampl (yellow card) 20'; Šeško 48' | Report | Hollerbach (yellow card) 22'; Tousart (yellow card) 47'; Trimmel (red card) 73' | Stadium: Red Bull Arena; Attendance: 44,032; Referee: Marco Fritz |

| 10 February 2024 21 | FC Augsburg | 2–2 | RB Leipzig | Augsburg |
| 15:30 CET (UTC+1) | Tietz 35'; Gouweleeuw (yellow card) 55'; Demirović 60'; Jakić (yellow card) 64'; Vargas (yellow card) 70'; Dahmen (yellow card) 81'; Mbabu (yellow card) 90+5' | Report | Openda 39', (penalty missed) 81'; Šeško 52'; Raum (yellow card) 74' | Stadium: WWK Arena; Attendance: 28,510; Referee: Benjamin Brand |

| 17 February 2024 22 | RB Leipzig | 2–0 | Borussia Mönchengladbach | Leipzig |
| 18:30 CET (UTC+1) | Simons 14'; Schlager (yellow card) 27'; Openda 57' | Report | Elvedi (yellow card) 8'; Itakura (yellow card) 33'; Koné (yellow card) 44'; Weigl (yellow card) 46'; Pefok (yellow card) 83' | Stadium: Red Bull Arena; Attendance: 44,822; Referee: Sören Storks |

| 24 February 2024 23 | Bayern Munich | 2–1 | RB Leipzig | Munich |
| 18:30 CET (UTC+1) | Pavlović (yellow card) 38'; Kane 56', 90+1'; De Ligt (yellow card) 59'; Musiala (yellow card) 66' | Report | Orbán (yellow card) 41'; Schlager (yellow card) 67'; Šeško 70'; Simakan (yellow card) 78' | Stadium: Allianz Arena; Attendance: 75,000; Referee: Sascha Stegemann |

| 2 March 2024 24 | VfL Bochum | 1–4 | RB Leipzig | Bochum |
| 15:30 CET (UTC+1) | Wittek 7'; Broschinski (yellow card) 38'; Loosli (yellow card) 66'; Ordets (yellow card) 77'; Kwarteng (red card) 86' | Report | Olmo 30'; Haidara (yellow card) 45+3'; Openda 68'; Ordets 71' (o.g.); Poulsen 72'; Simakan (yellow card) 81' | Stadium: Vonovia Ruhrstadion; Attendance: 24,200; Referee: Harm Osmers |

| 9 March 2024 25 | RB Leipzig | 2–0 | Darmstadt 98 | Leipzig |
| 15:30 CET (UTC+1) | Isherwood 3' (o.g.); Baumgartner 50' | Report | Müller (yellow card) 7'; Klarer (yellow card) 44'; Franjić (yellow card) 67' | Stadium: Red Bull Arena; Attendance: 40,000; Referee: Robert Hartmann |

| 15 March 2024 26 | 1. FC Köln | 1–5 | RB Leipzig | Cologne |
| 20:30 CET (UTC+1) | Adamyan 18'; Finkgräfe (yellow card) 49'; Alidou (yellow card) 66' | Report | Simons 15', (yellow card) 62'; Openda 63', 67'; Haidara 70', (yellow card) 72'; Poulsen 82' | Stadium: RheinEnergieStadion; Attendance: 49,000; Referee: Florian Badstübner |

| 30 March 2024 27 | RB Leipzig | 0–0 | Mainz 05 | Leipzig |
| 15:30 CET (UTC+1) | Lukeba (yellow card) 67'; Simons (yellow card) 86' | Report | Caci (yellow card) 20'; Mwene (yellow card) 27'; Amiri (yellow card) 34'; Barreiro (yellow card) 70'; Hanche-Olsen (yellow card) 79' | Stadium: Red Bull Arena; Attendance: 44,813; Referee: Frank Willenborg |

| 6 April 2024 28 | SC Freiburg | 1–4 | RB Leipzig | Freiburg |
| 15:30 CEST (UTC+2) | Höler (penalty missed) 41', (yellow card) 64'; Grifo 59'; Dōan (yellow card) 79'; Sallai (yellow card) 90+2' | Report | Haidara 2'; Openda 18', 44'; Šeško 54'; Schlager (yellow card) 65'; Raum (yellow card) 68'; Orbán (yellow card) 73'; Henrichs (yellow card) 75' | Stadium: Europa-Park Stadion; Attendance: 33,200; Referee: Daniel Siebert |

| 13 April 2024 29 | RB Leipzig | 3–0 | VfL Wolfsburg | Leipzig |
| 15:30 CEST (UTC+2) | Olmo 13'; Schlager (yellow card) 27'; Šeško 68'; Openda 82'; Simons (yellow card) 90+1' | Report | Fischer (yellow card) 25'; Behrens (yellow card) 25'; Jenz (yellow card) 35'; Svanberg (yellow card) 85' | Stadium: Red Bull Arena; Attendance: 45,858; Referee: Christian Dingert |

| 20 April 2024 30 | 1. FC Heidenheim | 1–2 | RB Leipzig | Heidenheim |
| 15:30 CEST (UTC+2) | Gimber (yellow card) 61'; Dovedan 69'; Schöppner (yellow card) 83'; Traoré (yellow card) 90+8' | Report | Henrichs (yellow card) 33'; Šeško 42'; Openda 85' | Stadium: Voith-Arena; Attendance: 15,000; Referee: Tobias Welz |

| 27 April 2024 31 | RB Leipzig | 4–1 | Borussia Dortmund | Leipzig |
| 15:30 CEST (UTC+2) | Openda 23'; Šeško 45+2'; Simakan (yellow card) 37', (goal) 46'; Baumgartner 80' | Report | Sancho 20', (yellow card) 37'; Schlotterbeck (yellow card) 76' | Stadium: Red Bull Arena; Attendance: 47,069; Referee: Deniz Aytekin |

| 3 May 2024 32 | 1899 Hoffenheim | 1–1 | RB Leipzig | Sinsheim |
| 20:30 CEST (UTC+2) | Kabak (yellow card) 69'; Kramarić 90' | Report | Šeško 38'; Simons (yellow card) 55' (yellow-red card) 72'; Raum (yellow card) 86' | Stadium: Rhein-Neckar-Arena; Attendance: 25,066; Referee: Harm Osmers |

| 11 May 2024 33 | RB Leipzig | 1–1 | Werder Bremen | Leipzig |
| 15:30 CEST (UTC+2) | Henrichs (yellow card) 28'; Šeško 61' | Report | Seiwald 36' (o.g.) | Stadium: Red Bull Arena; Attendance: 47,069; Referee: Sascha Stegemann |

| 18 May 2024 34 | Eintracht Frankfurt | 2–2 | RB Leipzig | Frankfurt |
| 15:30 CEST (UTC+2) | Ekitike 60'; Koch (yellow card) 61'; Marmoush 77' (pen.); Knauff (yellow card) 90+2' | Report | Simons 42' (pen.), (yellow card) 90+2'; Šeško 46'; Henrichs (yellow card) 51' | Stadium: Deutsche Bank Park; Attendance: 57,500; Referee: Felix Zwayer |

=== DFB-Pokal ===
The first round draw was held on 18 June 2023.

| 27 September 2023 First round | Wehen Wiesbaden | 2–3 | RB Leipzig | Wiesbaden |
| 20:45 CEST (UTC+2) | Prtajin 41', 73'; Goppel (yellow card) 45+1'; Vukotić (yellow card) 79'; Heußer (yellow card) 84' | Report | Forsberg 7'; Šeško 18', 70'; Openda (yellow card) 85' | Stadium: BRITA-Arena; Attendance: 12,000; Referee: Robert Hartmann |

| 31 October 2023 Second round | VfL Wolfsburg | 1–0 | RB Leipzig | Wolfsburg |
| 18:00 CET (UTC+1) | Černý 14'; Lacroix (yellow card) 43'; Vranckx (yellow card) 52'; Baku (yellow card) 70'; Pervan (yellow card) 82'; Paredes (yellow card) 84' | Report | Schlager (yellow card) 45+2'; Poulsen (yellow card) 42' (yellow-red card) 56'; Lukeba (yellow card) 64'; Simakan (yellow card) 90+7' | Stadium: Volkswagen Arena; Attendance: 16,031; Referee: Florian Badstübner |

=== DFL-Supercup ===
| 12 August 2023 Final | Bayern Munich | 0–3 | RB Leipzig | Munich |
| 20:45 CEST (UTC+2) | Pavard (yellow card) 14'; Upamecano (yellow card) 34' | Report | Olmo 3', 44', 68' (pen.), (yellow card) 71' | Stadium: Allianz Arena; Attendance: 75,000; Referee: Bastian Dankert |

=== UEFA Champions League ===
==== Group stage ====
The draw for the group stage was held on 31 August 2023.

| Pos | Team | Pld | W | D | L | GF | GA | GD | Pts | Qualification | MCI | RBL | YB | RSB |
|---|---|---|---|---|---|---|---|---|---|---|---|---|---|---|
| 1 | (England) Manchester City | 6 | 6 | 0 | 0 | 18 | 7 | +11 | 18 | Advance to knockout phase | — | 3–2 | 3–0 | 3–1 |
| 2 | (Germany) RB Leipzig | 6 | 4 | 0 | 2 | 13 | 10 | +3 | 12 | Advance to knockout phase | 1–3 | — | 2–1 | 3–1 |
| 3 | (Switzerland) Young Boys | 6 | 1 | 1 | 4 | 7 | 13 | −6 | 4 | Transfer to Europa League | 1–3 | 1–3 | — | 2–0 |
| 4 | (Serbia) Red Star Belgrade | 6 | 0 | 1 | 5 | 7 | 15 | −8 | 1 | | 2–3 | 1–2 | 2–2 | — |

Source: UEFA
Rules for classification: Group stage tiebreakers

| 19 September 2023 1 | Young Boys (Switzerland) | 1–3 | (Germany) RB Leipzig | Bern, Switzerland |
| 18:45 CEST (UTC+2) | Elia 33'; Benito (yellow card) 45'; Lauper (yellow card) 61'; Blum (yellow card) 77' | Report | Simakan 3', (yellow card) 90'; Kampl (yellow card) 56'; Simons (yellow card) 68'; Schlager 73'; Forsberg (yellow card) 79'; Šeško 90+2' | Stadium: Wankdorf; Attendance: 31,500; Referee: Enea Jorgji (Albania) |

| 4 October 2023 2 | RB Leipzig (Germany) | 1–3 | (England) Manchester City | Leipzig |
| 21:00 CEST (UTC+2) | Openda 48'; Schlager (yellow card) 71'; Raum (yellow card) 78' | Report | Foden 25'; Akanji (yellow card) 65'; Álvarez 84'; Doku 90+2' | Stadium: Red Bull Arena; Attendance: 45,228; Referee: Artur Soares Dias (Portugal) |

| 25 October 2023 3 | RB Leipzig (Germany) | 3–1 | (Serbia) Red Star Belgrade | Leipzig |
| 21:00 CEST (UTC+2) | Raum 12'; Henrichs (yellow card) 28'; Simons 59'; Olmo 84' | Report | Stamenić (yellow card) 34', (goal) 70'; Rodić (yellow card) 45+3'; Hwang (yellow card) 46'; Djiga (yellow card) 71' | Stadium: Red Bull Arena; Attendance: 42,209; Referee: José María Sánchez Martínez (Spain) |

| 7 November 2023 4 | Red Star Belgrade (Serbia) | 1–2 | (Germany) RB Leipzig | Belgrade, Serbia |
| 18:45 CEST (UTC+2) | Mijailović (yellow card) 6'; Krasso (yellow card) 28'; Ivanić (yellow card) 52'; Lučić (yellow card) 73'; Henrichs 81' (o.g.); Olayinka (yellow card) 90+4' | Report | Simons 8'; Simakan (yellow card) 49'; Lukeba (yellow card) 56'; Henrichs (yellow card) 59'; Openda 77' | Stadium: Rajko Mitić Stadium; Attendance: 41,961; Referee: Daniele Orsato (Italy) |

| 28 November 2023 5 | Manchester City (England) | 3–2 | (Germany) RB Leipzig | Manchester, England |
| 20:00 GMT (UTC±0) | Dias (yellow card) 21'; Haaland 54'; Foden 70'; Álvarez 87' | Report | Openda 13', 33' | Stadium: City of Manchester Stadium; Attendance: 51,402; Referee: Glenn Nyberg (Sweden) |

| 13 December 2023 6 | RB Leipzig (Germany) | 2–1 | (Switzerland) Young Boys | Leipzig |
| 18:45 CET (UTC+1) | Šeško 51'; Forsberg 56'; Poulsen (yellow card) 70'; Lenz (yellow card) 77' | Report | Garcia (yellow card) 33'; Colley 53', (yellow card) 81'; Monteiro (yellow card) 85' | Stadium: Red Bull Arena; Attendance: 43,331; Referee: Manfredas Lukjančukas (Lithuania) |

==== Knockout phase ====
===== Round of 16 =====
The draw for the round of 16 was held on 18 December 2023.

| 13 February 2024 First leg | RB Leipzig (Germany) | 0–1 | (Spain) Real Madrid | Leipzig |
| 21:00 CET (UTC+1) | Simakan (yellow card) 53'; Poulsen (yellow card) 77'; Šeško (yellow card) 85' | Report | Brahim 48'; Carvajal (yellow card) 66'; Vinícius (yellow card) 85' | Stadium: Red Bull Arena; Attendance: 45,028; Referee: Irfan Peljto (Bosnia and Herzegovina) |

| 6 March 2024 Second leg | Real Madrid (Spain) | 1–1 (2–1 agg.) | (Germany) RB Leipzig | Madrid, Spain |
| 21:00 CET (UTC+1) | Vinícius (yellow card) 54', (goal) 65'; Tchouaméni (yellow card) 73'; Kroos (yellow card) 75' | Report | Schlager (yellow card) 20'; Raum (yellow card) 50'; Orbán 68', (yellow card) 71' | Stadium: Santiago Bernabéu; Attendance: 76,126; Referee: Davide Massa (Italy) |

== Statistics ==
=== Appearances and goals ===
| No. | Pos | Nat | Player | Total | | Bundesliga | | DFB-Pokal | | DFL-Supercup | | Champions League | |
| No. | Pos | Nat | Player | Apps | Goals | Apps | Goals | Apps | Goals | Apps | Goals | Apps | Goals |
Goalkeepers
| 1 | GK | (Hungary) HUN | Péter Gulácsi | 19 | 0 | 14 | 0 | 2 | 0 | 0 | 0 | 3 | 0 |
| 21 | GK | (Germany) GER | Janis Blaswich | 26 | 0 | 20 | 0 | 0 | 0 | 1 | 0 | 5 | 0 |
| 25 | GK | (Germany) GER | Leopold Zingerle | 0 | 0 | 0 | 0 | 0 | 0 | 0 | 0 | 0 | 0 |
| 36 | GK | (Germany) GER | Timo Schlieck | 0 | 0 | 0 | 0 | 0 | 0 | 0 | 0 | 0 | 0 |
Defenders
| 2 | DF | (France) FRA | Mohamed Simakan | 42 | 3 | 23+9 | 2 | 0+2 | 0 | 1 | 0 | 7 | 1 |
| 3 | DF | (Germany) GER | Christopher Lenz | 8 | 0 | 0+5 | 0 | 1 | 0 | 0 | 0 | 1+1 | 0 |
| 4 | DF | (Hungary) HUN | Willi Orbán | 22 | 1 | 18+1 | 0 | 0 | 0 | 1 | 0 | 2 | 1 |
| 5 | DF | (France) FRA | El Chadaille Bitshiabu | 6 | 0 | 0+6 | 0 | 0 | 0 | 0 | 0 | 0 | 0 |
| 16 | DF | (Germany) GER | Lukas Klostermann | 34 | 1 | 16+9 | 1 | 2 | 0 | 0+1 | 0 | 3+3 | 0 |
| 22 | DF | (Germany) GER | David Raum | 40 | 3 | 31 | 2 | 1 | 0 | 1 | 0 | 7 | 1 |
| 23 | DF | (France) FRA | Castello Lukeba | 41 | 1 | 24+8 | 1 | 2 | 0 | 0 | 0 | 7 | 0 |
| 39 | DF | (Germany) GER | Benjamin Henrichs | 42 | 1 | 28+5 | 1 | 2 | 0 | 1 | 0 | 6 | 0 |
| 45 | MF | (Norway) NOR | Jonathan Norbye | 1 | 0 | 0+1 | 0 | 0 | 0 | 0 | 0 | 0 | 0 |
Midfielders
| 6 | MF | (North Macedonia) MKD | Eljif Elmas | 16 | 0 | 2+12 | 0 | 0 | 0 | 0 | 0 | 0+2 | 0 |
| 7 | MF | (Spain) ESP | Dani Olmo | 25 | 8 | 17+4 | 4 | 0 | 0 | 1 | 3 | 2+1 | 1 |
| 8 | MF | (Mali) MLI | Amadou Haidara | 27 | 2 | 19+2 | 2 | 1 | 0 | 0 | 0 | 3+2 | 0 |
| 13 | MF | (Austria) AUT | Nicolas Seiwald | 27 | 0 | 6+15 | 0 | 1 | 0 | 1 | 0 | 3+1 | 0 |
| 14 | MF | (Austria) AUT | Christoph Baumgartner | 40 | 5 | 11+21 | 5 | 0+2 | 0 | 0 | 0 | 0+6 | 0 |
| 24 | MF | (Austria) AUT | Xaver Schlager | 40 | 1 | 29 | 0 | 1+1 | 0 | 1 | 0 | 7+1 | 1 |
| 38 | MF | (Germany) GER | Nuha Jatta | 1 | 0 | 0+1 | 0 | 0 | 0 | 0 | 0 | 0 | 0 |
| 44 | MF | (Slovenia) SLO | Kevin Kampl | 35 | 1 | 14+12 | 1 | 1+1 | 0 | 0 | 0 | 3+4 | 0 |
Forwards
| 9 | FW | (Denmark) DEN | Yussuf Poulsen | 37 | 5 | 12+16 | 5 | 1 | 0 | 0+1 | 0 | 4+3 | 0 |
| 17 | FW | (Belgium) BEL | Loïs Openda | 44 | 28 | 33+1 | 24 | 0+1 | 0 | 1 | 0 | 7+1 | 4 |
| 20 | FW | (Netherlands) NED | Xavi Simons | 43 | 10 | 32 | 8 | 1+1 | 0 | 1 | 0 | 7+1 | 2 |
| 30 | FW | (Slovenia) SLO | Benjamin Šeško | 42 | 18 | 17+14 | 14 | 1+1 | 2 | 0+1 | 0 | 4+4 | 2 |
Players transferred out during the season
| 10 | MF | (Sweden) SWE | Emil Forsberg | 22 | 4 | 5+9 | 2 | 1 | 1 | 0+1 | 0 | 6 | 1 |
| 11 | FW | (Germany) GER | Timo Werner | 14 | 2 | 2+6 | 2 | 1 | 0 | 1 | 0 | 0+4 | 0 |
| 18 | MF | (Portugal) POR | Fábio Carvalho | 15 | 0 | 1+8 | 0 | 1+1 | 0 | 0+1 | 0 | 1+2 | 0 |
| 26 | MF | (Guinea) GUI | Ilaix Moriba | 0 | 0 | 0 | 0 | 0 | 0 | 0 | 0 | 0 | 0 |
| 28 | MF | (United States) USA | Caden Clark | 0 | 0 | 0 | 0 | 0 | 0 | 0 | 0 | 0 | 0 |
| 38 | MF | (Spain) ESP | Hugo Novoa | 0 | 0 | 0 | 0 | 0 | 0 | 0 | 0 | 0 | 0 |

Source: Competitions

=== Goalscorers ===
| Rank | No. | Pos. | Nat. | Player | Bundesliga | DFB-Pokal | DFL-Supercup | Champions League | Total |
|---|---|---|---|---|---|---|---|---|---|
| 1 | 17 | FW | (Belgium) | Loïs Openda | 24 | 0 | 0 | 4 | 28 |
| 2 | 30 | FW | (Slovenia) | Benjamin Šeško | 14 | 2 | 0 | 2 | 18 |
| 3 | 20 | FW | (Netherlands) | Xavi Simons | 8 | 0 | 0 | 2 | 10 |
| 4 | 7 | MF | (Spain) | Dani Olmo | 4 | 0 | 3 | 1 | 8 |
| 5 | 9 | FW | (Denmark) | Yussuf Poulsen | 5 | 0 | 0 | 0 | 5 |
| 5 | 14 | MF | (Austria) | Christoph Baumgartner | 5 | 0 | 0 | 0 | 5 |
| 7 | 10 | MF | (Sweden) | Emil Forsberg | 2 | 1 | 0 | 1 | 4 |
| 8 | 2 | DF | (France) | Mohamed Simakan | 2 | 0 | 0 | 1 | 3 |
| 8 | 22 | DF | (Germany) | David Raum | 2 | 0 | 0 | 1 | 3 |
| 10 | 8 | MF | (Mali) | Amadou Haidara | 2 | 0 | 0 | 0 | 2 |
| 10 | 11 | FW | (Germany) | Timo Werner | 2 | 0 | 0 | 0 | 2 |
| 12 | 4 | DF | (Hungary) | Willi Orbán | 0 | 0 | 0 | 1 | 1 |
| 12 | 16 | DF | (Germany) | Lukas Klostermann | 1 | 0 | 0 | 0 | 1 |
| 12 | 23 | DF | (France) | Castello Lukeba | 1 | 0 | 0 | 0 | 1 |
| 12 | 24 | MF | (Austria) | Xaver Schlager | 0 | 0 | 0 | 1 | 1 |
| 12 | 39 | DF | (Germany) | Benjamin Henrichs | 1 | 0 | 0 | 0 | 1 |
| 12 | 44 | MF | (Slovenia) | Kevin Kampl | 1 | 0 | 0 | 0 | 1 |
| Own goals | | | | | 3 | 0 | 0 | 0 | 3 |
| Totals | | | | | 77 | 3 | 3 | 14 | 97 |

=== Assists ===
| Rank | No. | Pos. | Nat. | Player | Bundesliga | DFB-Pokal | DFL-Supercup | Champions League | Total |
|---|---|---|---|---|---|---|---|---|---|
| 1 | 20 | FW | (Netherlands) | Xavi Simons | 11 | 0 | 0 | 2 | 13 |
| 2 | 22 | DF | (Germany) | David Raum | 8 | 0 | 0 | 3 | 11 |
| 3 | 39 | DF | (Germany) | Benjamin Henrichs | 5 | 0 | 1 | 2 | 8 |
| 4 | 24 | MF | (Austria) | Xaver Schlager | 5 | 0 | 0 | 2 | 7 |
| 5 | 17 | FW | (Belgium) | Loïs Openda | 6 | 0 | 0 | 0 | 6 |
| 6 | 7 | MF | (Spain) | Dani Olmo | 5 | 0 | 0 | 0 | 5 |
| 7 | 2 | DF | (France) | Mohamed Simakan | 3 | 0 | 0 | 0 | 3 |
| 7 | 9 | FW | (Norway) | Yussuf Poulsen | 2 | 0 | 0 | 1 | 3 |
| 9 | 13 | MF | (Austria) | Nicolas Seiwald | 2 | 0 | 0 | 0 | 2 |
| 9 | 30 | FW | (Slovenia) | Benjamin Šeško | 2 | 0 | 0 | 0 | 2 |
| 9 | 44 | MF | (Slovenia) | Kevin Kampl | 0 | 0 | 0 | 2 | 2 |
| 12 | 8 | MF | (Mali) | Amadou Haidara | 1 | 0 | 0 | 0 | 1 |
| 12 | 10 | MF | (Sweden) | Emil Forsberg | 1 | 0 | 0 | 0 | 1 |
| 12 | 11 | FW | (Germany) | Timo Werner | 0 | 0 | 1 | 0 | 1 |
| 12 | 14 | MF | (Austria) | Christoph Baumgartner | 1 | 0 | 0 | 0 | 1 |
| 12 | 27 | GK | (Germany) | Janis Blaswich | 0 | 0 | 0 | 1 | 1 |
| Totals | | | | | 52 | 0 | 2 | 12 | 66 |
