= 2024–25 RB Leipzig season =

RB Leipzig
2024–25 season
- Owner: Red Bull GmbH
- CEO: Oliver Mintzlaff
- Head coach: Marco Rose (until 30 March); Zsolt Lőw (interim, from 30 March)
- Stadium: Red Bull Arena
- Bundesliga: 7th
- DFB-Pokal: Semi-finals
- UEFA Champions League: League phase
- Top goalscorer: League: Benjamin Šeško (13); All: Benjamin Šeško (21)
- Average home league attendance: 45,045
Home colours	Away colours	Third colours

The 2024–25 season was the 16th season in the history of RB Leipzig, and the club's ninth consecutive season in the Bundesliga. In addition to the domestic league, the club participated in the DFB-Pokal and the UEFA Champions League.

On 30 March 2025, the Leipzig board decided to sack head coach Marco Rose after a run of poor results. Rose’s staff was also relieved of their duties.

== Players ==
=== First-team squad ===
As of 3 February 2025

Note: Flags indicate national team as defined under FIFA eligibility rules; some limited exceptions apply. Players may hold more than one non-FIFA nationality.

No.	Pos.	Nation	Player
1	GK	HUN	Péter Gulácsi
3	DF	NED	Lutsharel Geertruida
4	DF	HUN	Willi Orbán (captain)
5	DF	FRA	El Chadaille Bitshiabu
7	MF	NOR	Antonio Nusa
8	MF	MLI	Amadou Haidara
9	FW	DEN	Yussuf Poulsen
10	FW	NED	Xavi Simons
11	FW	BEL	Loïs Openda
13	MF	AUT	Nicolas Seiwald
14	MF	AUT	Christoph Baumgartner
16	DF	GER	Lukas Klostermann (3rd captain)
17	DF	GER	Ridle Baku

No.	Pos.	Nation	Player
18	MF	BEL	Arthur Vermeeren
20	MF	GER	Assan Ouédraogo
21	DF	SRB	Kosta Nedeljković (on loan from Aston Villa)
22	DF	GER	David Raum
23	DF	FRA	Castello Lukeba
24	MF	AUT	Xaver Schlager
25	GK	GER	Leopold Zingerle
26	GK	BEL	Maarten Vandevoordt
27	FW	FRA	Tidiam Gomis
30	FW	SLO	Benjamin Šeško
39	DF	GER	Benjamin Henrichs
44	MF	SLO	Kevin Kampl (vice-captain)

=== Players out on loan ===
Note: Flags indicate national team as defined under FIFA eligibility rules; some limited exceptions apply. Players may hold more than one non-FIFA nationality.

No.	Pos.	Nation	Player
—	GK	GER	Janis Blaswich (at Red Bull Salzburg until 30 June 2025)
—	DF	GER	Frederik Jäkel (at SV Elversberg until 30 June 2025)
—	DF	GER	Tim Köhler (at SC Verl until 30 June 2025)
—	MF	GUI	Ilaix Moriba (at Celta Vigo until 30 June 2025)

No.	Pos.	Nation	Player
—	MF	MKD	Eljif Elmas (at Torino until 30 June 2025)
—	FW	NED	Yannick Eduardo (at Emmen until 30 June 2025)
—	FW	POR	André Silva (at Werder Bremen until 30 June 2025)
—	FW	GER	Timo Werner (at Tottenham Hotspur until 30 June 2025)

== Transfers ==
=== In ===
Pos.	Player	Transferred from	Fee	Date	Source
MF	(Guinea) Ilaix Moriba	(Spain) Getafe	Loan return	30 June 2024	
FW	(Portugal) André Silva	(Spain) Real Sociedad	Loan return	30 June 2024	
GK	(Belgium) Maarten Vandevoordt	(Belgium) Genk	€10,000,000	1 July 2024	
MF	(Germany) Assan Ouédraogo	(Germany) Schalke 04	€10,000,000	1 July 2024	
FW	(Netherlands) Xavi Simons	(France) Paris Saint-Germain	Loan	5 August 2024	
MF	(Norway) Antonio Nusa	(Belgium) Club Brugge	€21,000,000	13 August 2024	
MF	(Belgium) Arthur Vermeeren	(Spain) Atlético Madrid	Loan (€3,000,000)	26 August 2024	
DF	(Netherlands) Lutsharel Geertruida	(Netherlands) Feyenoord	€20,000,000	30 August 2024	
DF	(Germany) Ridle Baku	(Germany) VfL Wolfsburg	€4,500,000	10 January 2025	
MF	(Belgium) Arthur Vermeeren	(Spain) Atlético Madrid	€20,000,000	17 January 2025	
FW	(Netherlands) Xavi Simons	(France) Paris Saint-Germain	€50,000,000	30 January 2025	
DF	(Serbia) Kosta Nedeljković	(England) Aston Villa	Loan	3 February 2025	
FW	(France) Tidiam Gomis	(France) Caen	€1,000,000	3 February 2025	

=== Out ===
Pos.	Player	Transferred to	Fee	Date	Source
GK	(Germany) Janis Blaswich	(Austria) Red Bull Salzburg	Loan (€1,000,000)	1 July 2024	
GK	(Germany) Tim Schreiber	(Germany) Dynamo Dresden	€150,000	1 July 2024	
DF	(Spain) Angeliño	(Italy) Roma	€5,000,000	1 July 2024	
FW	(Germany) Timo Werner	(England) Tottenham Hotspur	Loan	1 July 2024	
FW	(Netherlands) Yannick Eduardo	(Netherlands) De Graafschap	Loan	2 July 2024	
DF	(Spain) Hugo Novoa	(Spain) Alavés	€1,500,000	22 July 2024	
MF	(Guinea) Ilaix Moriba	(Spain) Celta Vigo	Loan	7 August 2024	
MF	(Spain) Dani Olmo	(Spain) Barcelona	€55,000,000	9 August 2024	
DF	(France) Mohamed Simakan	(Saudi Arabia) Al-Nassr	€45,000,000	30 August 2024	
MF	(North Macedonia) Eljif Elmas	(Italy) Torino	Loan	30 January 2025	
FW	(Portugal) André Silva	(Germany) Werder Bremen	Loan	3 February 2025	
MF	(Germany) Nuha Jatta	(Italy) Torino	Loan	3 February 2025	

Notes

1. ^{†} Loan transfer made permanent

== Friendlies ==
=== Pre-season ===
The team, for the first time in its history, arranged a pre-season tour outside of Europe.

19 July 2024 Friendly	Rot-Weiß Erfurt	Cancelled	RB Leipzig
15:00 CEST (UTC+2)
Note: The match was cancelled following protests by the home club.

19 July 2024 Friendly	SV Babelsberg	0–1	RB Leipzig	Potsdam
16:00 CEST (UTC+2)		Report	Elmas 45+3'	Stadium: Karl-Liebknecht-Stadion; Attendance: 0

26 July 2024 Friendly	RB Leipzig	1–0	Erzgebirge Aue	Leipzig
--:-- CEST (UTC+2)				Attendance: 0
Note: The details of the match were not revealed to the public.

31 July 2024 Friendly	RB Leipzig	2–0	Aston Villa	Harrison, United States
20:00 EDT (UTC−4)	Silva 17'; Openda (yellow card) 27', (goal) 41'	Report	Diego Carlos (yellow card) 27' (yellow-red card) 42'	Stadium: Red Bull Arena

3 August 2024 Friendly	Wolverhampton Wanderers	3–0	RB Leipzig	Miami, United States
19:30 EDT (UTC−4)	Gomes (yellow card) 16', (goal) 73'; Sarabia 18', 62'; Semedo (yellow card) 82'	Report	Haidara (yellow card) 39'; Gebel (yellow card) 51'; Elmas (yellow card) 51'	Stadium: Chase Stadium

10 August 2024 Friendly	RB Leipzig	Cancelled	Lazio	Leipzig
18:00 CEST (UTC+2)				Stadium: Red Bull Arena

10 August 2024 Friendly	RB Leipzig	1–1	Paris Saint-Germain	Leipzig
18:00 CEST (UTC+2)	Openda 13'	Report	Ramos 70'; Soler (yellow card) 81'	Stadium: Red Bull Arena; Attendance: 40,365; Referee: Richard Hempel (Germany)

=== Mid-season ===
6 January 2025 Friendly	RB Leipzig	10–0	Baník Most-Souš	Leipzig
12:00 CET (UTC+1)	Simons 6', 45'; Šeško 9', 26', 48', 56'; Openda 24'; Raum 29'; 55' (o.g.); Ramsak 68'	Report		Attendance: 0

=== Post-season ===
28 May 2025 Friendly	Santos	1–3	RB Leipzig	Bragança Paulista, Brazil
19:00 BRT (UTC−3)	Luisão (yellow card) 40'; Escobar (yellow card) 45+1'; Hyan 70'	Report	Simons 15', 64'; Openda 60'	Stadium: Estádio Cícero de Souza Marques; Attendance: 7,604; Referee: Daiane Muniz (Brazil)

== Competitions ==
=== Overall record ===
Competition	First match	Last match	Starting round	Final position	Record							
Competition	First match	Last match	Starting round	Final position	Pld	W	D	L	GF	GA	GD	Win %
Bundesliga	24 August 2024	17 May 2025	Matchday 1	7th	34	13	12	9	53	48	+5	38.24
DFB-Pokal	17 August 2024	2 April 2025	First round	Semi-finals	5	4	0	1	13	6	+7	80.00
UEFA Champions League	19 September 2024	29 January 2025	League phase	League phase	8	1	0	7	8	15	−7	12.50
Total					47	18	12	17	74	69	+5	38.30

Source: Soccerway

=== Bundesliga ===
==== League table ====
Pos	Team	Pld	W	D	L	GF	GA	GD	Pts	Qualification or relegation
5	SC Freiburg	34	16	7	11	49	53	−4	55	Qualification for the Europa League league phase
6	Mainz 05	34	14	10	10	55	43	+12	52	Qualification for the Conference League play-off round
7	RB Leipzig	34	13	12	9	53	48	+5	51	
8	Werder Bremen	34	14	9	11	54	57	−3	51	
9	VfB Stuttgart	34	14	8	12	64	53	+11	50	Qualification for the Europa League league phase (Note: VfB Stuttgart qualified for the Europa League league phase by winning the 2024–25 DFB-Pokal.)

Source: Bundesliga
Rules for classification: 1) Points; 2) Goal difference; 3) Goals scored; 4) Head-to-head results; 5) Head-to-head away goals scored; 6) Away goals scored; 7) Play-off.
(Rules 4–6 only apply after home and away matches have been played between the tied teams.)

==== Results summary ====
Overall								Home						Away					
Pld	W	D	L	GF	GA	GD	Pts	W	D	L	GF	GA	GD	W	D	L	GF	GA	GD
34	13	12	9	53	48	+5	51	8	6	3	33	23	+10	5	6	6	20	25	−5

Source: DFB

==== Results by round ====
Round	1	2	3	4	5	6	7	8	9	10	11	12	13	14	15	16	17	18	19	20	21	22	23	24	25	26	27	28	29	30	31	32	33	34
Ground	H	A	H	A	H	A	A	H	A	H	A	H	A	H	A	H	A	A	H	A	H	A	H	H	A	H	A	H	A	H	A	H	A	H
Result	W	W	D	D	W	W	W	W	L	D	L	L	W	W	L	W	L	D	D	D	W	D	D	L	D	W	L	W	W	D	L	D	D	L
Position	7	3	3	5	3	2	2	2	2	2	3	4	4	4	4	4	4	5	5	4	4	4	6	6	6	5	6	5	4	4	5	6	7	7

Source: DFB
A = Away; H = Home; W = Win; D = Draw; L = Loss

==== Matches ====
The match schedule was released on 4 July 2024.

24 August 2024 1	RB Leipzig	1–0	VfL Bochum	Leipzig
15:30 CEST (UTC+2)	Simons (yellow card) 35'; Nusa 59'; Orbán (red card) 85'	Report	Bero (yellow card) 15'; Wittek (yellow card) 23'; Sissoko (yellow card) 81'	Stadium: Red Bull Arena; Attendance: 44,611; Referee: Benjamin Brand

31 August 2024 2	Bayer Leverkusen	2–3	RB Leipzig	Leverkusen
18:30 CEST (UTC+2)	Boniface (yellow card) 12'; Frimpong (yellow card) 18', (goal) 39'; Grimaldo 45'; Tapsoba (yellow card) 82'	Report	Kampl 45+7'; Openda 57', 80'; Klostermann (yellow card) 61'	Stadium: BayArena; Attendance: 29,615; Referee: Matthias Jöllenbeck

14 September 2024 3	RB Leipzig	0–0	Union Berlin	Leipzig
15:30 CEST (UTC+2)	Haidara (yellow card) 53'; Kampl (yellow card) 74'; Openda (penalty missed) 74'	Report	Bénes (yellow card) 26'; Khedira (yellow card) 61'; Doekhi (yellow card) 85'	Stadium: Red Bull Arena; Attendance: 47,800; Referee: Sven Jablonski

22 September 2024 4	FC St. Pauli	0–0	RB Leipzig	St. Pauli
19:30 CEST (UTC+2)	Treu (yellow card) 29'; Saad (yellow card) 71'	Report	Haidara (yellow card) 24'	Stadium: Millerntor-Stadion; Attendance: 29,251; Referee: Robert Hartmann

28 September 2024 5	RB Leipzig	4–0	FC Augsburg	Leipzig
15:30 CEST (UTC+2)	Šeško 11', 15'; Seiwald (yellow card) 42'; Openda 46'; Simons 57'	Report	Gouweleeuw (penalty missed) 27'; Onyeka (yellow card) 78'; Matsima (yellow card) 83'	Stadium: Red Bull Arena; Attendance: 44,407; Referee: Daniel Siebert

6 October 2024 6	1. FC Heidenheim	0–1	RB Leipzig	Heidenheim
15:30 CEST (UTC+2)	Föhrenbach (yellow card) 18'; Schimmer (yellow card) 85'	Report	Openda 59'; Simons (yellow card) 72'; Klostermann (yellow card) 90+2'	Stadium: Voith-Arena; Attendance: 15,000; Referee: Sascha Stegemann

19 October 2024 7	Mainz 05	0–2	RB Leipzig	Mainz
15:30 CEST (UTC+2)	Nebel (yellow card) 90+1'	Report	Simons 20'; Orbán 37'; Haidara (yellow card) 53'; Vermeeren (yellow card) 60'; Elmas (yellow card) 89'	Stadium: Opel Arena; Attendance: 30,100; Referee: Felix Zwayer

26 October 2024 8	RB Leipzig	3–1	SC Freiburg	Leipzig
15:30 CEST (UTC+2)	Orbán 47'; Geertruida 58'; Openda 79', (yellow card) 80'; Vermeeren (yellow card) 88'	Report	Dōan 15'; Adamu (yellow card) 38'; Lienhart (yellow card) 46'	Stadium: Red Bull Arena; Attendance: 45,908; Referee: Sven Jablonski

2 November 2024 9	Borussia Dortmund	2–1	RB Leipzig	Dortmund
18:30 CET (UTC+1)	Beier (yellow card) 21', (goal) 30'; Bensebaini (yellow card) 34'; Guirassy 65'; Azhil (yellow card) 90+7'	Report	Baumgartner (yellow card) 8'; Šeško 27'; Henrichs (yellow card) 35'; Geertruida (yellow card) 40'; Kampl (yellow card) 81'	Stadium: Signal Iduna Park; Attendance: 81,365; Referee: Tobias Stieler

9 November 2024 10	RB Leipzig	0–0	Borussia Mönchengladbach	Leipzig
18:30 CET (UTC+1)	Vermeeren (yellow card) 51'; Haidara (yellow card) 89'	Report	Hack (yellow card) 41'; Reitz (yellow card) 44'	Stadium: Red Bull Arena; Attendance: 46,887; Referee: Christian Dingert

23 November 2024 11	TSG Hoffenheim	4–3	RB Leipzig	Sinsheim
15:30 CET (UTC+1)	Hložek 17', 82'; Bischof 50'; Kramarić (yellow card) 75'; Bruun Larsen 87'; Kadeřábek (yellow card) 90'	Report	Orbán 15'; Nusa 19'; Nsoki 67' (o.g.); Lukeba (yellow card) 85'	Stadium: Rhein-Neckar-Arena; Attendance: 28,023; Referee: Frank Willenborg

30 November 2024 12	RB Leipzig	1–5	VfL Wolfsburg	Leipzig
15:30 CET (UTC+1)	Baumgartner (yellow card) 26'; Vermeeren (yellow card) 52'; Orbán 82'	Report	Amoura 4', 16'; Tomás 5'; Fischer (yellow card) 57'; Mæhle 64'; Behrens 90+1'	Stadium: Red Bull Arena; Attendance: 40,000; Referee: Martin Petersen

7 December 2024 13	Holstein Kiel	0–2	RB Leipzig	Kiel
15:30 CET (UTC+1)	Gigović (yellow card) 35'; Weiner (yellow card) 67'; Schulz (yellow card) 68'; Bernhardsson (yellow card) 90'	Report	Šeško 27'; Openda (yellow card) 56'; Silva 69' (pen.); Vermeeren (yellow card) 74'; Henrichs (yellow card) 83'	Stadium: Holstein-Stadion; Attendance: 14,715; Referee: Florian Badstübner

15 December 2024 14	RB Leipzig	2–1	Eintracht Frankfurt	Leipzig
19:30 CET (UTC+1)	Šeško 19'; Openda 51'; Orbán (yellow card) 70'	Report	Brown 40', (yellow card) 81'; Dahoud (yellow card) 50'; Knauff (yellow card) 68'	Stadium: Red Bull Arena; Attendance: 40,193; Referee: Benjamin Brand

20 December 2024 15	Bayern Munich	5–1	RB Leipzig	Munich
20:30 CET (UTC+1)	Musiala 1'; Upamecano (yellow card) 20'; Laimer 25', (yellow card) 64'; Kimmich 36', (yellow card) 82'; Olise (yellow card) 56'; Kane (yellow card) 60'; Sané 75'; Davies 78'	Report	Šeško 2'; Schlager (yellow card) 26'; Henrichs (yellow card) 59'	Stadium: Allianz Arena; Attendance: 75,000; Referee: Daniel Siebert

12 January 2025 16	RB Leipzig	4–2	Werder Bremen	Leipzig
15:30 CET (UTC+1)	Simons 24', 35'; Šeško 47'; Haidara (yellow card) 82'; Baumgartner 90'	Report	Friedl (yellow card) 11'; Weiser 26'; Burke 90+3'	Stadium: Red Bull Arena; Attendance: 47,187; Referee: Tobias Reichel

15 January 2025 17	VfB Stuttgart	2–1	RB Leipzig	Stuttgart
20:30 CET (UTC+1)	Undav (yellow card) 5'; Bruun Larsen 50'; Woltemade 60'; Leweling (yellow card) 83'	Report	Šeško 10', (yellow card) 20' (yellow-red card) 85'; Orbán (yellow card) 45+1'; Openda (yellow card) 70' (yellow-red card) 88'; Raum (yellow card) 86'; Bitshiabu (yellow card) 90+4'	Stadium: MHPArena; Attendance: 57,500; Referee: Sascha Stegemann

18 January 2025 18	VfL Bochum	3–3	RB Leipzig	Bochum
15:30 CET (UTC+1)	Bero (yellow card) 9'; Passlack (yellow card) 20'; Boadu 48', 56', 61' (pen.); Sissoko (yellow card) 69'; Ordets (yellow card) 90+2'	Report	Orbán 10'; Nusa 13'; Baumgartner 22'	Stadium: Vonovia Ruhrstadion; Attendance: 24,158; Referee: Robert Hartmann

25 January 2025 19	RB Leipzig	2–2	Bayer Leverkusen	Leipzig
15:30 CET (UTC+1)	Raum 41'; Simons (yellow card) 79'; Tapsoba 85' (o.g.); Baumgartner (yellow card) 88'	Report	Schick 18'; García 36'; Andrich (yellow card) 40'; Tapsoba (yellow card) 42'	Stadium: Red Bull Arena; Attendance: 46,793; Referee: Bastian Dankert

1 February 2025 20	Union Berlin	0–0	RB Leipzig	Berlin
18:30 CET (UTC+1)	Juranović (yellow card) 32'; Leite (yellow card) 49'; Bénes (yellow card) 90+5'	Report	Baumgartner (yellow card) 64'; Poulsen (yellow card) 78'	Stadium: Stadion An der Alten Försterei; Attendance: 22,012; Referee: Daniel Schlager

9 February 2025 21	RB Leipzig	2–0	FC St. Pauli	Leipzig
17:30 CET (UTC+1)	Geertruida (yellow card) 1'; Šeško 16'; Simons 35'; Kampl (yellow card) 66'; Orbán (red card) 69'	Report	Van der Heyden (yellow card) 11'; Dźwigała (yellow card) 58'	Stadium: Red Bull Arena; Attendance: 46,021; Referee: Florian Badstübner

14 February 2025 22	FC Augsburg	0–0	RB Leipzig	Augsburg
20:30 CET (UTC+1)	Claude-Maurice (yellow card) 28'; Matsima (yellow card) 60'	Report	Kampl (yellow card) 62'	Stadium: WWK Arena; Attendance: 28,260; Referee: Sascha Stegemann

23 February 2025 23	RB Leipzig	2–2	1. FC Heidenheim	Leipzig
15:30 CET (UTC+1)	Baumgartner (yellow card) 6'; Orbán (yellow card) 12'; Openda 45+2'; Šeško 64' (pen.); Simons (yellow card) 90+8'	Report	Honsak 6'; Pieringer 13' (pen.); Gimber (yellow card) 15'; Schöppner (yellow card) 67'; Keller (yellow card) 77'	Stadium: Red Bull Arena; Attendance: 44,000; Referee: Martin Petersen

1 March 2025 24	RB Leipzig	1–2	Mainz 05	Leipzig
15:30 CET (UTC+1)	Simons 1'; Haidara (yellow card) 52'	Report	Amiri 52'; Burkardt 58'; Maloney (yellow card) 88'	Stadium: Red Bull Arena; Attendance: 41,406; Referee: Daniel Siebert

8 March 2025 25	SC Freiburg	0–0	RB Leipzig	Freiburg
18:30 CET (UTC+1)		Report	Orbán (yellow card) 50'; Seiwald (yellow card) 63'; Raum (yellow card) 87'	Stadium: Europa-Park Stadion; Attendance: 32,900; Referee: Sven Jablonski

15 March 2025 26	RB Leipzig	2–0	Borussia Dortmund	Leipzig
18:30 CET (UTC+1)	Simons 18'; Openda 48'; Raum (yellow card) 63'; Haidara (yellow card) 86'; Lukeba (yellow card) 86'	Report	Can (yellow card) 10'; Ryerson (yellow card) 45+1'; Chukwuemeka (yellow card) 83'	Stadium: Red Bull Arena; Attendance: 47,800; Referee: Matthias Jöllenbeck

29 March 2025 27	Borussia Mönchengladbach	1–0	RB Leipzig	Mönchengladbach
15:30 CET (UTC+1)	Weigl (yellow card) 49'; Pléa 56'; Čvančara (yellow card) 87'	Report	Baku (yellow card) 24'; Gomis (yellow card) 84'	Stadium: Borussia-Park; Attendance: 52,358; Referee: Tobias Stieler

5 April 2025 28	RB Leipzig	3–1	TSG Hoffenheim	Leipzig
15:30 CEST (UTC+2)	Šeško 24'; Baku 43'; Poulsen 84'	Report	Touré (yellow card) 4'; Bischof 11'; Østigård (red card) 28'; Chaves (yellow card) 72'; Orban (yellow card) 90'	Stadium: Red Bull Arena; Attendance: 44,478; Referee: Robert Hartmann

11 April 2025 29	VfL Wolfsburg	2–3	RB Leipzig	Wolfsburg
20:30 CEST (UTC+2)	Gerhardt (yellow card) 34'; Fischer 58', (yellow card) 60'; Olsen 75'	Report	Openda 11', (yellow card) 76'; Simons 26', 49', (yellow card) 36'; Bitshiabu (yellow card) 36'	Stadium: Volkswagen Arena; Attendance: 23,070; Referee: Florian Exner

19 April 2025 30	RB Leipzig	1–1	Holstein Kiel	Leipzig
15:30 CEST (UTC+2)	Klostermann (yellow card) 41'; Šeško 74' (pen.)	Report	Rosenboom (yellow card) 29'; Machino 44'; Arp (yellow card) 90+8'	Stadium: Red Bull Arena; Attendance: 45,940; Referee: Felix Brych

26 April 2025 31	Eintracht Frankfurt	4–0	RB Leipzig	Frankfurt
18:30 CEST (UTC+2)	Knauff 21', 53'; Collins (yellow card) 57'; Ekitike 67'; Koch 71'	Report	Raum (yellow card) 48'; Bitshiabu (red card) 50'; Klostermann (yellow card) 70'	Stadium: Deutsche Bank Park; Attendance: 56,500; Referee: Matthias Jöllenbeck

3 May 2025 32	RB Leipzig	3–3	Bayern Munich	Leipzig
15:30 CEST (UTC+2)	Šeško 11'; Klostermann 39'; Raum (yellow card) 50'; Kampl (yellow card) 78'; Vermeeren (yellow card) 90'; Poulsen 90+5'	Report	Dier 62', (yellow card) 74'; Olise 63'; Sané 83'	Stadium: Red Bull Arena; Attendance: 47,800; Referee: Felix Zwayer

10 May 2025 33	Werder Bremen	0–0	RB Leipzig	Bremen
15:30 CEST (UTC+2)	Friedl (yellow card) 13'	Report	Klostermann (yellow card) 2'; Vermeeren (yellow card) 33'; Nedeljković (yellow card) 77'	Stadium: Weser-Stadion; Attendance: 41,000; Referee: Bastian Dankert

17 May 2025 34	RB Leipzig	2–3	VfB Stuttgart	Leipzig
15:30 CEST (UTC+2)	Simons 8'; Gomis (yellow card) 33'; Baku 44'	Report	Undav 23'; Woltemade 57'; Demirović 78'	Stadium: Red Bull Arena; Attendance: 47,800; Referee: Daniel Siebert

=== DFB-Pokal ===
17 August 2024 First round	Rot-Weiss Essen	1–4	RB Leipzig	Essen
15:30 CEST (UTC+2)	Safi 2'; Alonso (yellow card) 47'; Arslan (yellow card) 63'	Report	Šeško 12'; Openda 40'; Henrichs (yellow card) 66'; Nusa 84'; Simons 88'	Stadium: Stadion an der Hafenstraße; Attendance: 17,000; Referee: Christian Dingert

29 October 2024 Second round	RB Leipzig	4–2	FC St. Pauli	Leipzig
18:00 CET (UTC+1)	Poulsen 12', 30'; Baumgartner 17'; Nusa 80'	Report	Guilavogui 28'; Saliakas (yellow card) 40'; Smith 58'	Stadium: Red Bull Arena; Attendance: 40,478; Referee: Felix Zwayer

4 December 2024 Round of 16	RB Leipzig	3–0	Eintracht Frankfurt	Leipzig
20:45 CET (UTC+1)	Šeško 31'; Seiwald (yellow card) 45+2'; Openda 50', 58'	Report	Dahoud (yellow card) 87'	Stadium: Red Bull Arena; Attendance: 37,187; Referee: Sven Jablonski

26 February 2025 Quarter-finals	RB Leipzig	1–0	VfL Wolfsburg	Leipzig
20:45 CET (UTC+1)	Šeško 69' (pen.); Lukeba (yellow card) 82'; Haidara (yellow card) 86'	Report	Mæhle (yellow card) 67'	Stadium: Red Bull Arena; Attendance: 35,000; Referee: Tobias Reichel

2 April 2025 Semi-finals	VfB Stuttgart	3–1	RB Leipzig	Stuttgart
20:45 CEST (UTC+2)	Stiller 5'; Woltemade 57'; Leweling 73'	Report	Seiwald (yellow card) 36'; Šeško 62'; Raum (yellow card) 73'; Simons (yellow card) 90+6'	Stadium: MHPArena; Attendance: 60,000; Referee: Sven Jablonski

=== UEFA Champions League ===
==== League phase ====
The draw for the league phase was held on 29 August 2024.

Pos	Team	Pld	W	D	L	GF	GA	GD	Pts
30	(Austrian Football Association) Sturm Graz	8	2	0	6	5	14	−9	6
31	(Football Association of the Czech Republic) Sparta Prague	8	1	1	6	7	21	−14	4
32	(German Football Association) RB Leipzig	8	1	0	7	8	15	−7	3
33	(Royal Spanish Football Federation) Girona	8	1	0	7	5	13	−8	3
34	(Austrian Football Association) Red Bull Salzburg	8	1	0	7	5	27	−22	3

Source: UEFA
Rules for classification: League phase tiebreakers

Round	1	2	3	4	5	6	7	8
Ground	A	H	H	A	A	H	H	A
Result	L	L	L	L	L	L	W	L
Position	22	29	31	32	34	34	30	32
Points	0	0	0	0	0	0	3	3

Source: UEFA
A = Away; H = Home; W = Win; D = Draw; L = Loss

19 September 2024 1	Atlético Madrid (Spain)	2–1	(Germany) RB Leipzig	Madrid, Spain
21:00 CEST (UTC+2)	Le Normand (yellow card) 10'; Griezmann 28'; De Paul (yellow card) 60'; Giménez (yellow card) 60', (goal) 90'	Report	Šeško 4'; Lukeba (yellow card) 39'; Baumgartner (yellow card) 49'; Henrichs (yellow card) 64'; Openda (yellow card) 90+4'	Stadium: Metropolitano Stadium; Attendance: 57,856; Referee: Ivan Kružliak (Slovakia)

2 October 2024 2	RB Leipzig (Germany)	2–3	(Italy) Juventus	Leipzig, Germany
21:00 CEST (UTC+2)	Šeško 30', 65' (pen.); Raum (yellow card) 79'	Report	Vlahović 50', 68'; Di Gregorio (red card) 59'; Conceição 82', (yellow card) 85'; Perin (yellow card) 90+9'	Stadium: Red Bull Arena; Attendance: 45,228; Referee: François Letexier (France)

23 October 2024 3	RB Leipzig (Germany)	0–1	(England) Liverpool	Leipzig, Germany
21:00 CEST (UTC+2)	Lukeba (yellow card) 8'; Geertruida (yellow card) 23'	Report	Mac Allister (yellow card) 12'; Núñez 27'	Stadium: Red Bull Arena; Attendance: 45,228; Referee: Sandro Schärer (Switzerland)

5 November 2024 4	Celtic (Scotland)	3–1	(Germany) RB Leipzig	Glasgow, Scotland
20:00 GMT (UTC±0)	Kühn 35', 45+1'; Hatate 72'	Report	Baumgartner 23'; Šeško (yellow card) 62'	Stadium: Celtic Park; Attendance: 57,551; Referee: Benoît Bastien (France)

26 November 2024 5	Inter Milan (Italy)	1–0	(Germany) RB Leipzig	Milan, Italy
21:00 CET (UTC+1)	Pavard (yellow card) 11'; Lukeba 27' (o.g.); Bastoni (yellow card) 33'	Report	Baumgartner (yellow card) 34'; Lukeba (yellow card) 85'	Stadium: San Siro; Attendance: 63,174; Referee: João Pinheiro (Portugal)

10 December 2024 6	RB Leipzig (Germany)	2–3	(England) Aston Villa	Leipzig, Germany
21:00 CET (UTC+1)	Openda 27'; Baumgartner 62'; Henrichs (yellow card) 81'	Report	McGinn 3'; Digne (yellow card) 45'; Durán 52'; Diego Carlos (yellow card) 79'; Barkley 85'	Stadium: Red Bull Arena; Attendance: 40,406; Referee: Maurizio Mariani (Italy)

22 January 2025 7	RB Leipzig (Germany)	2–1	(Portugal) Sporting CP	Leipzig, Germany
18:45 CET (UTC+1)	Šeško 19'; Poulsen 78'; Raum (yellow card) 79'; Vandevoordt (yellow card) 86'; Orbán (yellow card) 87'	Report	Gyökeres 75'	Stadium: Red Bull Arena; Attendance: 33,478; Referee: Manfredas Lukjančukas (Lithuania)

29 January 2025 8	Sturm Graz (Austria)	1–0	(Germany) RB Leipzig	Graz, Austria
21:00 CET (UTC+1)	Malić 42'; Lavalée (yellow card) 52'; Jatta (yellow card) 64'	Report	Haidara (yellow card) 41'	Stadium: Liebenauer Stadium; Attendance: 26,851; Referee: Mykola Balakin (Ukraine)

== Statistics ==
=== Appearances and goals ===
No.	Pos	Nat	Player	Total		Bundesliga		DFB-Pokal		Champions League	
No.	Pos	Nat	Player	Apps	Goals	Apps	Goals	Apps	Goals	Apps	Goals
Goalkeepers
1	GK	(Hungary) HUN	Péter Gulácsi	37	0	30	0	1	0	6	0
25	GK	(Germany) GER	Leopold Zingerle	0	0	0	0	0	0	0	0
26	GK	(Belgium) BEL	Maarten Vandevoordt	12	0	4+2	0	4	0	2	0
Defenders
3	DF	(Netherlands) NED	Lutsharel Geertruida	35	1	17+7	1	3	0	7+1	0
4	DF	(Hungary) HUN	Willi Orbán	38	5	25	5	5	0	8	0
5	DF	(France) FRA	El Chadaille Bitshiabu	28	0	13+8	0	3	0	3+1	0
16	DF	(Germany) GER	Lukas Klostermann	35	1	20+8	1	2+2	0	0+3	0
17	DF	(Germany) GER	Ridle Baku	21	2	15+4	2	2	0	0	0
21	DF	(Serbia) SRB	Kosta Nedeljković	11	0	6+4	0	1	0	0	0
22	DF	(Germany) GER	David Raum	29	1	21+1	1	3	0	3+1	0
23	DF	(France) FRA	Castello Lukeba	31	0	18+5	0	0+3	0	4+1	0
39	DF	(Germany) GER	Benjamin Henrichs	24	0	10+5	0	2+1	0	5+1	0
45	MF	(Norway) NOR	Jonathan Norbye	0	0	0	0	0	0	0	0
Midfielders
7	MF	(Norway) NOR	Antonio Nusa	36	5	16+9	3	1+2	2	6+2	0
8	MF	(Mali) MLI	Amadou Haidara	40	0	16+12	0	2+2	0	8	0
13	MF	(Austria) AUT	Nicolas Seiwald	41	0	20+10	0	3+1	0	4+3	0
14	MF	(Austria) AUT	Christoph Baumgartner	43	5	18+13	2	2+2	1	6+2	2
18	MF	(Belgium) BEL	Arthur Vermeeren	39	0	18+10	0	4	0	4+3	0
20	MF	(Germany) GER	Assan Ouédraogo	5	0	0+3	0	0	0	0+2	0
24	MF	(Austria) AUT	Xaver Schlager	5	0	2+2	0	0+1	0	0	0
31	MF	(Germany) GER	Faik Sakar	1	0	0+1	0	0	0	0	0
44	MF	(Slovenia) SLO	Kevin Kampl	34	1	18+8	1	3	0	2+3	0
47	MF	(Germany) GER	Viggo Gebel	4	0	0+1	0	0+2	0	0+1	0
Forwards
9	FW	(Denmark) DEN	Yussuf Poulsen	29	5	2+20	2	1	2	1+5	1
10	FW	(Netherlands) NED	Xavi Simons	33	11	25	10	3	1	4+1	0
11	FW	(Belgium) BEL	Loïs Openda	45	13	28+5	9	4	3	8	1
27	FW	(France) FRA	Tidiam Gomis	9	0	1+7	0	0+1	0	0	0
30	FW	(Slovenia) SLO	Benjamin Šeško	45	21	30+3	13	4	4	6+2	4
Players transferred/loaned out during the season
2	DF	(France) FRA	Mohamed Simakan	2	0	1	0	1	0	0	0
6	MF	(North Macedonia) MKD	Eljif Elmas	6	0	0+2	0	0+1	0	0+3	0
19	FW	(Portugal) POR	André Silva	15	1	0+8	1	1+2	0	1+3	0
38	MF	(Germany) GER	Nuha Jatta	0	0	0	0	0	0	0	0

Source: Competitions

=== Goalscorers ===
Rank	No.	Pos.	Nat.	Player	Bundesliga	DFB-Pokal	Champions League	Total
1	30	FW	(Slovenia)	Benjamin Šeško	13	4	4	21
2	11	FW	(Belgium)	Loïs Openda	9	3	1	13
3	20	FW	(Netherlands)	Xavi Simons	10	1	0	11
4	7	MF	(Norway)	Antonio Nusa	3	2	0	5
4	4	DF	(Hungary)	Willi Orbán	5	0	0	5
4	14	MF	(Austria)	Christoph Baumgartner	2	1	2	5
4	9	FW	(Denmark)	Yussuf Poulsen	2	2	1	5
8	17	DF	(Germany)	Ridle Baku	2	0	0	2
9	44	MF	(Slovenia)	Kevin Kampl	1	0	0	1
9	3	DF	(Netherlands)	Lutsharel Geertruida	1	0	0	1
9	9	FW	(Portugal)	André Silva	1	0	0	1
9	22	DF	(Germany)	David Raum	1	0	0	1
9	16	DF	(Germany)	Lukas Klostermann	1	0	0	1
Own goals					2	0	0	1
Totals					53	13	8	74

=== Assists ===
Rank	No.	Pos.	Nat.	Player	Bundesliga	DFB-Pokal	Champions League	Total
1	11	FW	(Belgium)	Loïs Openda	5	0	2	7
1	20	FW	(Netherlands)	Xavi Simons	6	1	0	7
3	7	MF	(Norway)	Antonio Nusa	3	3	0	6
3	30	FW	(Slovenia)	Benjamin Šeško	5	1	0	6
3	22	DF	(Germany)	David Raum	5	0	1	6
6	19	FW	(Portugal)	André Silva	2	1	0	3
6	17	DF	(Germany)	Ridle Baku	3	0	0	3
8	8	MF	(Mali)	Amadou Haidara	1	1	0	2
8	39	DF	(Germany)	Benjamin Henrichs	2	0	0	2
8	14	MF	(Austria)	Christoph Baumgartner	1	1	0	2
8	18	MF	(Belgium)	Arthur Vermeeren	2	0	0	2
12	3	DF	(Netherlands)	Lutsharel Geertruida	0	1	0	1
12	6	MF	(North Macedonia)	Eljif Elmas	0	1	0	1
12	13	MF	(Austria)	Nicolas Seiwald	0	0	1	1
12	27	FW	(France)	Tidiam Gomis	1	0	0	1
Totals					36	10	4	50
