= Castello Lukeba =

French footballer (born 2002)

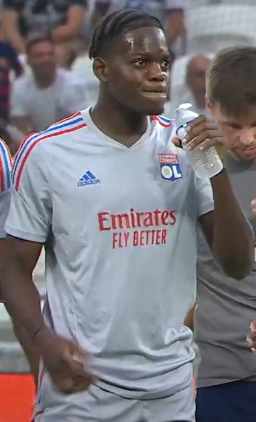
- Lukeba with Lyon in 2022

Personal information
- Full name: Junior Castello Lukeba
- Date of birth: 17 December 2002 (age 23)
- Place of birth: Lyon, France
- Height: 1.84 m (6 ft 0 in)
- Position: Centre-back

Team information
- Current team: RB Leipzig
- Number: 23

Youth career
- 2009–2011: Saint-Genis Laval
- 2011–2021: Lyon

Senior career*
Years	Team	Apps	(Gls)
2020–2021	Lyon B	9	(0)
2021–2023	Lyon	58	(4)
2023–	RB Leipzig	85	(2)

International career
2018–2019	France U17	6	(0)
2021	France U20	1	(0)
2022–2025	France U21	27	(0)
2024	France Olympic	10	(0)
2023	France	1	(0)
Medal record
Men's football
Representing France
Olympic Games
Silver medal – second place	Paris 2024	Team
- * Club domestic league appearances and goals as of 17:30, 31 October 2026 (UTC)

Junior Castello Lukeba (born 17 December 2002) is a French professional footballer who plays as a centre-back for Bundesliga club RB Leipzig.

== Club career ==
=== Lyon ===
Lukeba was born in Lyon. Having joined the Lyon Academy in 2011, Lukeba signed his first professional contract with the club on 1 July 2021. He made his professional debut for Lyon on the 7 August 2021 as a starter against Brest on 2021–22 Ligue 1 opening round. He played full 90 minutes during the match but it eventually ended in a 1–1 draw. Lukeba made his European football debut on 25 November 2021 on a 3–1 against Brøndby in 2021–22 UEFA Europa League group stage. He scored his first goal for the club on 22 December 2021 against Metz with a header, assisted by Rayan Cherki with a cross following a corner. In January 2022, he extended his contract until 2025.

=== RB Leipzig ===
On 11 August 2023, Lukeba moved to the Bundesliga club RB Leipzig for a total reported fee of €34 million, signing a five-year contract. Lukeba repeatedly emphasised his excitement and eagerness to join RB Leipzig, saying: "I was extremely keen on joining RB Leipzig and moving to the Bundesliga, so I’m really happy that the move is now complete. I’m excited by the training ground, the stadium, the city and, above all, the team with all the young players – I can’t wait to play football here." He made his debut for Leipzig on 19 August 2023 in a 3–2 loss against Bayer Leverkusen, being substituted on for Nicolas Seiwald in the 62nd minute. He scored his first goal for RB Leipzig in a 2–2 draw against Bayern Munich on 30 September 2023.

== International career ==
Born in France, Lukeba is of Angolan descent. He decided to represent France at the international level and received his first call up in France U-21 in November 2021, where he joined his club mates Maxence Caqueret, Rayan Cherki, and Malo Gusto.

On 9 October 2023, Lukeba received his first call-up to the France national team for matches against the Netherlands and Scotland, replacing the injured Axel Disasi.

== Career statistics ==
=== Club ===
As of match played 31 October 2026

Appearances and goals by club, season and competition
Club	Season	League			National cup (Note: Includes Coupe de France, DFB-Pokal)		Europe		Other		Total	
Club	Season	Division	Apps	Goals	Apps	Goals	Apps	Goals	Apps	Goals	Apps	Goals
Lyon B	2020–21	CFA 2	7	0	—		—		—		7	0
Lyon B	2021–22	CFA 2	2	0	—		—		—		2	0
Lyon B	Total		9	0	—		—		—		9	0
Lyon	2020–21	Ligue 1	0	0	0	0	—		—		0	0
Lyon	2021–22	Ligue 1	24	2	0	0	6 (Note: Appearances in UEFA Europa League)	0	—		30	2
Lyon	2022–23	Ligue 1	34	2	4	0	—		—		38	2
Lyon	Total		58	4	4	0	6	0	—		68	4
RB Leipzig	2023–24	Bundesliga	32	1	2	0	7 (Note: Appearances in UEFA Champions League)	0	0	0	41	1
RB Leipzig	2024–25	Bundesliga	23	0	3	0	5	0	—		31	0
RB Leipzig	2025–26	Bundesliga	26	1	3	0	—		—		29	1
RB Leipzig	2026–27	Bundesliga	4	0	2	0	2	0	—		8	0
RB Leipzig	Total		85	2	10	0	14	0	0	0	109	2
Career total			151	6	14	0	20	0	0	0	186	6

=== International ===
As of match played 17 October 2023

Appearances and goals by national team and year
National team	Year	Apps	Goals
France	2023	1	0
Total		1	0

== Honours ==
RB Leipzig

- DFL-Supercup: 2023

France U23

- Summer Olympics silver medal: 2024

Orders

- Knight of the National Order of Merit: 2024
