= List of RB Leipzig seasons =

RasenBallsport Leipzig e.V., commonly known as RB Leipzig, is a professional association football club based in Leipzig, Saxony, Germany. They play their home matches at the Red Bull Arena. The club was founded in 2009 by initiative of the company Red Bull GmbH, who purchased the playing rights of a fifth division side SSV Markranstädt, with the intention of advancing the new club to the top-flight Bundesliga within eight years. Men's professional football is run by the spin-off organization RasenballSport Leipzig GmbH.

As of the end of 2025–26, the club's first team has spent ten seasons in the first tier of German football, two in the second, one in the third, three in the fourth and one in the fifth. The table details their achievements in first-team competitions, and records their top goalscorer and average home league attendance, for each completed season since their first appearance in the NOFV-Oberliga Süd in 2009–10.

== Key ==
Key to competitions

- Bundesliga (1. BL) – The top-flight of football in Germany, established in 1963.
- 2. Bundesliga (2. BL) – The second division of football in Germany, established in 1974.
- 3. Liga (3. L) – The third division of football in Germany, established in 2008.
- Regionalliga (RL) – The fourth division of football in Germany, established in 1964 and designated as the fourth tier in 2008.
- NOFV-Oberliga (NOFV) – A fifth division of football in Germany, established in 1991.
- DFB-Pokal (DFBP) – The premier knockout cup competition in German football, first contested in 1935.
- UEFA Champions League (UCL) – The premier competition in European football since 1955. It went by the name of European Cup until 1992.
- UEFA Europa League (UEL) – The second-tier competition in European football since 1971. It went by the name of UEFA Cup until 2009.

Key to colors and symbols

1st or W	Winners
2nd or RU	Runners-up
3rd	Third place
↑	Promoted
↓	Relegated
♦	League Golden Boot
Italics	Ongoing competition

Key to league record

- Season = The year and article of the season
- Div = Division/level on pyramid
- League = League name
- Pld = Matches played
- W = Matches won
- D = Matches drawn
- L = Matches lost
- GF = Goals for
- GA = Goals against
- GD = Goal difference
- Pts = Points
- Pos. = League position

Key to cup record

- DNE = Did not enter
- DNQ = Did not qualify
- NH = Competition not held or cancelled
- QR = Qualifying round
- PR = Preliminary round
- GS = Group stage
- LP = League phase
- R1 = First round
- R2 = Second round
- R3 = Third round
- R4 = Fourth round
- R5 = Fifth round
- Ro16 = Round of 16
- QF = Quarter-finals
- SF = Semi-finals
- F = Final
- RU = Runners-up
- W = Winners

== Seasons ==
Season	League											DFB- Pokal	Continental / Other		Average attendance	Top goalscorer(s)	
Season	Div	League	Pld	W	D	L	GF	GA	GD	Pts	Pos.	DFB- Pokal	Continental / Other		Average attendance	Player(s)	Goals
2009–10	5	NOFV	30	26	2	2	74	17	+57	80	1st	DNQ	Saxony Cup	QF	2,150	(Germany) Jochen Höfler	14
2010–11	4	RLN	34	18	10	6	57	29	+28	64	4th	DNQ	Saxony Cup	W	4,206	(Germany) Daniel Frahn	16
2011–12	4	RLN	34	22	7	5	71	30	+41	73	3rd	R2	Saxony Cup	QF	7,401	(Germany) Daniel Frahn	29♦
2012–13	4	RLNO	30	21	9	0	65	22	+43	72	1st	DNQ	Saxony Cup	W	7,563	(Germany) Daniel Frahn	20♦
2013–14	3	3. L	38	24	7	7	65	34	+ 31	79	2nd	R1	Saxony Cup	SF	16,734	(Germany) Daniel Frahn	19
2014–15	2	2. BL	34	13	11	10	39	31	+8	50	5th	R16	—		25,025	(Denmark) Yussuf Poulsen	12
2015–16	2	2. BL	34	20	7	7	54	32	+22	67	2nd	R2	—		29,441	(Germany) Davie Selke	10
2016–17	1	1. BL	34	20	7	7	66	39	+27	67	2nd	R1	—		41,454	(Germany) Timo Werner	21
2017–18	1	1. BL	34	15	8	11	57	53	+4	53	6th	R2	UEFA Champions League UEFA Europa League	GS QF	39,397	(Germany) Timo Werner	21
2018–19	1	1. BL	34	19	9	6	63	29	+34	66	3rd	RU	UEFA Europa League	GS	38,380	(Germany) Timo Werner	19
2019–20	1	1. BL	34	18	12	4	81	37	+44	66	3rd	R3	UEFA Champions League	SF	40,815	(Germany) Timo Werner	34
2020–21	1	1. BL	34	19	8	7	60	32	+28	65	2nd	RU	UEFA Champions League	R16	0	(Denmark) Yussuf Poulsen	11
2021–22	1	1. BL	34	17	7	10	72	37	+35	58	4th	W	UEFA Champions League UEFA Europa League	GS SF	22,124	(France) Christopher Nkunku	35
2022–23	1	1. BL	34	20	6	8	64	41	+23	66	3rd	W	UEFA Champions League DFL-Supercup	R16 RU	45,559	(France) Christopher Nkunku	23♦
2023–24	1	1. BL	34	19	8	7	77	39	+38	65	4th	R2	UEFA Champions League DFL-Supercup	R16 W	45,171	(Belgium) Loïs Openda	28
2024–25	1	1. BL	34	13	12	9	53	48	+5	51	7th	SF	UEFA Champions League	LP	45,045	(Slovenia) Benjamin Šeško	21
2025–26	1	1. BL	34	20	5	9	66	47	+19	65	3rd	QF	—		44,164	(Austria) Christoph Baumgartner	17
Total	–	–	574	324	135	115	1,084	597	+487	1,107	—	—	—		—	—	—

1. Avg. attendance include statistics from league matches only.
2. Top goalscorer(s) includes all goals scored in League, DFB-Pokal, UEFA Champions League, UEFA Europa League, and other competitive matches.
