= Jonathan Norbye =

Norwegian footballer (born 2007)

Personal information
- Full name: Jonathan Vonheim Norbye
- Date of birth: 26 March 2007 (age 19)
- Place of birth: Alta, Norway
- Height: 1.94 m (6 ft 4 in)
- Position: Defender

Team information
- Current team: Haugesund
- Number: 23

Youth career
- 2018–2022: Alta
- 2023–2026: RB Leipzig

Senior career*
Years	Team	Apps	(Gls)
2022–2023	Alta	10	(1)
2024–2026	RB Leipzig	1	(0)
2025	→ Arminia Bielefeld II (loan)	8	(1)
2026	→ Fredrikstad (loan)	9	(0)
2026–	Haugesund	12	(2)

International career^{‡}
2022	Norway U15	5	(0)
2023	Norway U16	10	(0)
2024	Norway U17	2	(1)
2024	Norway U18	5	(0)
2025–	Norway U19	7	(0)
2025–	Norway U20	5	(0)
- * Club domestic league appearances and goals as of 14 November 2026 ‡ National team caps and goals as of 13 October 2025

Jonathan Vonheim Norbye (born 26 March 2007) is a Norwegian professional footballer who plays as a defender for Norwegian OBOS-ligaen club Haugesund.

== Career ==
Norbye joined the youth academy of German Bundesliga side RB Leipzig at the age of fifteen.

On 23 June 2025, Norbye was loaned by 2. Bundesliga club Arminia Bielefeld. He only made appearances for Arminia's reserve team in the first half of the season, and on 22 December 2025, the loan was terminated early.

On 31 March 2026, Norbye moved on loan to Fredrikstad until the end of 2026, with an option to buy.

== Style of play ==
Norbye mainly operates as a defender and has been described as "a calmness and confidence in his game... has made the centre-back position his own".

== Personal life ==
Norbye is the younger brother of Norwegian footballer Tobias Vonheim Norbye.

== Career statistics ==
As of match played 14 November 2026

Appearances and goals by club, season and competition
Club	Season	League			National cup (Note: Includes Norwegian Cup)		Europe		Other		Total	
Club	Season	Division	Apps	Goals	Apps	Goals	Apps	Goals	Apps	Goals	Apps	Goals
Alta	2022	Norwegian Second Division	1	0	1	0	—		—		2	0
Alta	2023	Norwegian Second Division	9	1	2	0	—		—		11	0
Alta	Total		10	1	3	0	—		—		13	0
RB Leipzig	2023–24	Bundesliga	1	0	0	0	0	0	—		1	0
RB Leipzig	2024–25	Bundesliga	0	0	0	0	0	0	—		0	0
RB Leipzig	2025–26	Bundesliga	0	0	0	0	0	0	—		0	0
RB Leipzig	Total		1	0	0	0	0	0	—		1	0
Arminia Bielefeld II (loan)	2025–26	Oberliga Westfalen	8	1	—		—		—		8	1
Fredrikstad (loan)	2026	Eliteserien	9	0	—		—		—		9	0
Haugesund	2026	OBOS-ligaen	12	2	1	0	—		—		13	2
Career total			40	4	4	0	0	0	0	0	44	4
