= David Raum =

German footballer (born 1998)

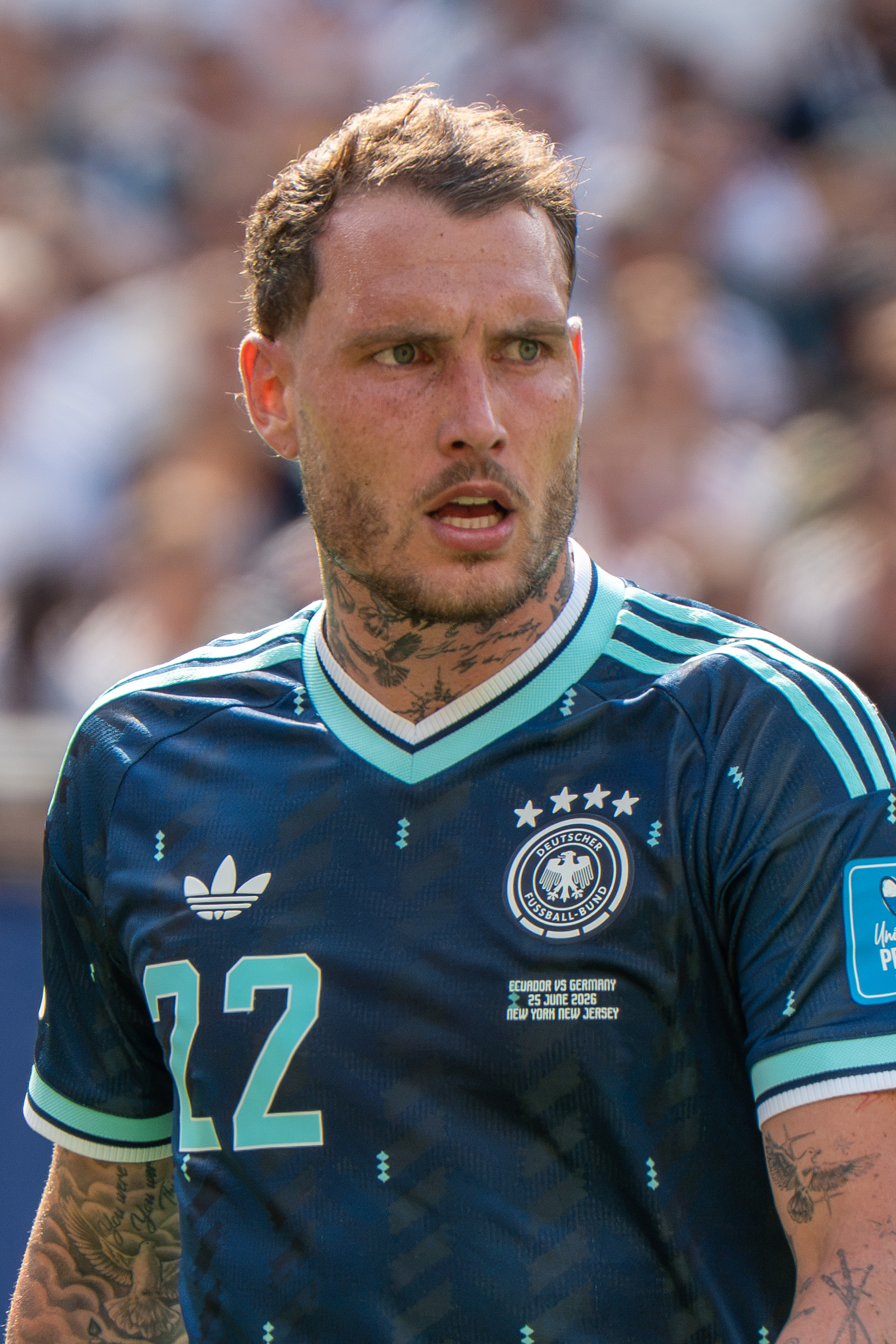
- Raum with Germany in 2026

Personal information
- Full name: David Raum
- Date of birth: 22 April 1998 (age 28)
- Place of birth: Nuremberg, Germany
- Height: 1.81 m (5 ft 11 in)
- Positions: Left midfielder; left-back

Team information
- Current team: RB Leipzig
- Number: 22

Youth career
- 2002–2006: Tuspo Nürnberg
- 2006–2017: Greuther Fürth

Senior career*
Years	Team	Apps	(Gls)
2016–2019	Greuther Fürth II	16	(1)
2016–2021	Greuther Fürth	94	(4)
2021–2022	TSG Hoffenheim	32	(3)
2022–	RB Leipzig	118	(6)

International career^{‡}
2016–2017	Germany U19	5	(1)
2017–2018	Germany U20	6	(0)
2020–2021	Germany U21	8	(0)
2021	Germany Olympic	3	(0)
2021–	Germany	40	(1)
Medal record
Representing Germany
UEFA European Under-21 Championship
Winner	2021
- * Club domestic league appearances and goals as of 17:30, 31 October 2026 (UTC) ‡ National team caps and goals as of 08:38, 5 October 2026 (UTC)

David Raum (German pronunciation: [ˈdaːvɪt ˈʁaʊm]; born 22 April 1998) is a German professional footballer who plays as a left midfielder or left-back for Bundesliga club RB Leipzig, which he captains, and the Germany national team.

== Club career ==
=== Greuther Fürth ===
Raum was born in Nuremberg and started playing football at the local club Tuspo Nürnberg at the age of four. At the age of eight, he was scouted to the youth academy of SpVgg Greuther Fürth in the neighbouring town and progressed through their youth teams.

As an under-19 footballer, Raum gained his first experience in the senior sides and was part of the first team from the 2017–18 2. Bundesliga season. In the first two rounds of the 2017–18 DFB-Pokal he scored in both games, but did not make it to the final round with his team after a defeat against FC Ingolstadt. He also made 20 appearances in at second-highest German level and mainly played as a substitute in the following seasons. His contract, which was set to expire in June 2020, was extended with an option for an additional year in May 2020.

=== Hoffenheim ===
After the 2020–21 season, in which Greuther Fürth won promotion to the Bundesliga, Raum moved to TSG Hoffenheim as a free agent, having signed a pre-contract with the club in January 2021. He signed a four-year contract with Die Kraichgauer. On 11 December 2021, he scored his first Bundesliga goal in a 2–1 away win over Freiburg.

=== RB Leipzig ===
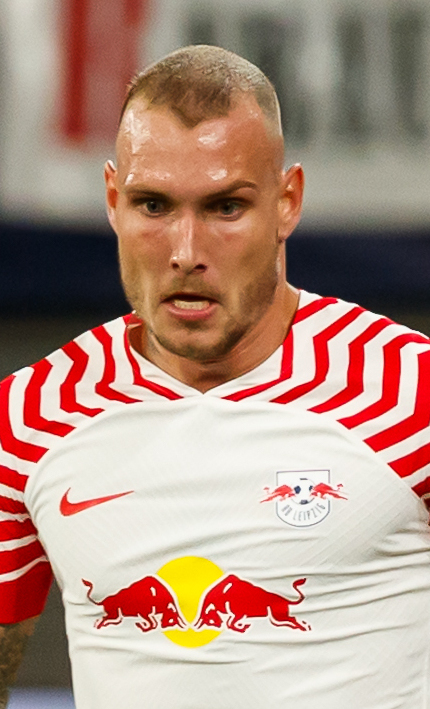
Raum playing for RB Leipzig in 2023

On 31 July 2022, he joined Bundesliga club RB Leipzig, on a five-year deal until 2027.

On 16 September 2023, he scored his first goal in a 3–0 win over Augsburg. A month later, on 25 October, he scored his first Champions League goal in a 3–1 win over Red Star Belgrade.

On 14 August 2025, Raum was named as Leipzig's new club captain.

== International career ==
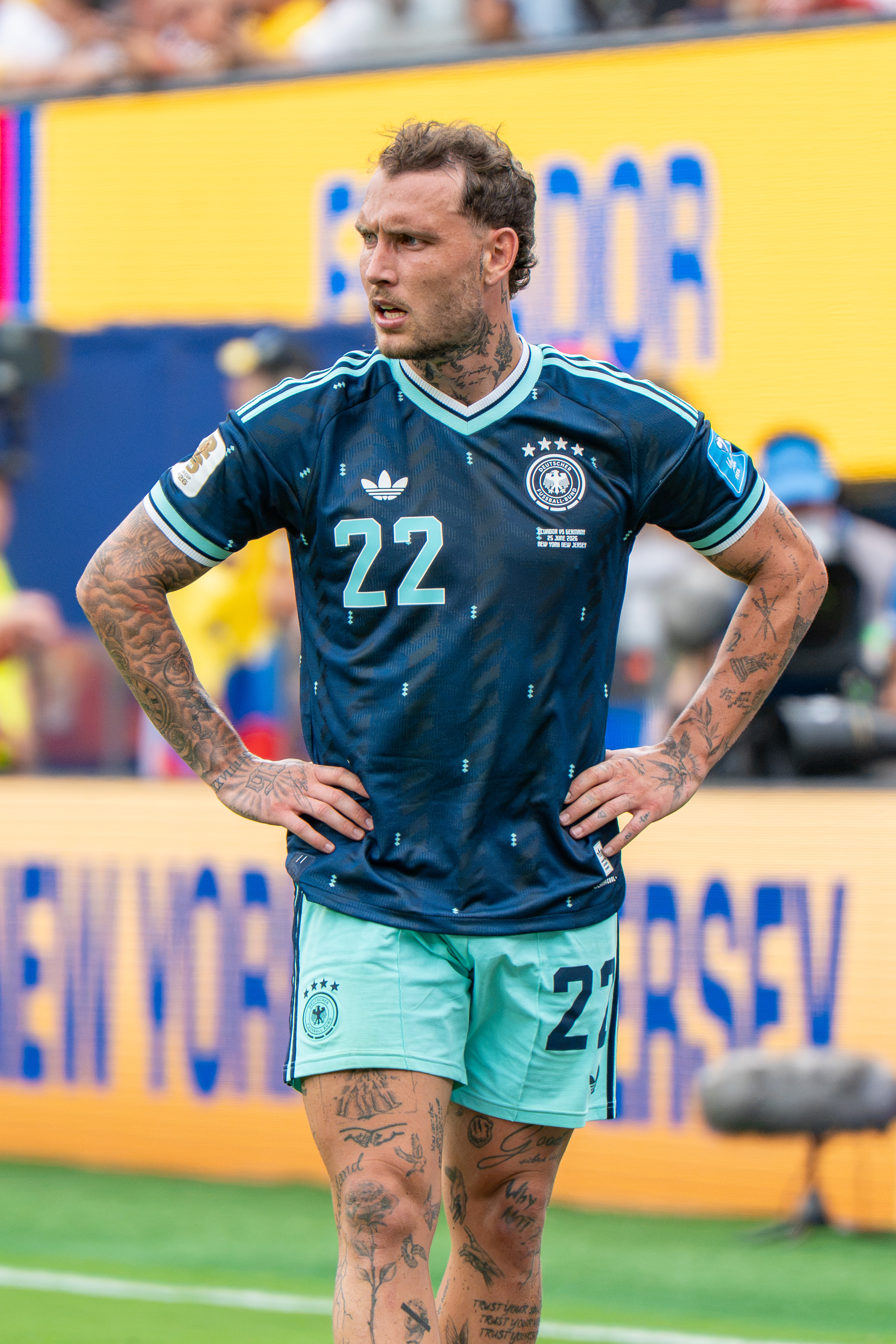
Raum with Germany at the 2026 FIFA World Cup

Raum made a total of 11 international appearances at under-19 and under-20 levels.

After debuting on 17 November 2020 in a 2–1 victory over Wales for the under-21 team, under-21 national team coach Stefan Kuntz called up Raum for the squad for the 2021 UEFA European Under-21 Championship. He was utilised in all games, as Germany won the final 1–0 over Portugal.

On 5 September 2021, Raum debuted with the senior Germany national team in a 6–0 2022 FIFA World Cup qualification victory over Armenia. He was included in the squad for the 2022 FIFA World Cup, starting at left back in all three Group E matches. In the team's opening match against Japan, he was fouled by Shūichi Gonda to win a penalty kick that was converted by İlkay Gündoğan. He also assisted Serge Gnabry's opening goal in the 4–2 win over Costa Rica. He recorded the third-highest speed of the tournament behind Nico Williams of Spain and Kamaldeen Sulemana of Ghana, reaching 35.40km/h.

In June 2024, Raum was named in Germany's squad for UEFA Euro 2024. He made his tournament debut in the final Group A match against Switzerland, coming on as a substitute for Maximilian Mittelstädt in the 61st minute and assisting Niclas Füllkrug's equalising goal in the second minute of stoppage time. He went on to start at left back in both the round of 16 match against Denmark and the quarter-final against Spain.

On 10 October 2025, he scored his first international goal from a free kick in a 4–0 win over Luxembourg during the 2026 FIFA World Cup qualification.

On 21 May 2026, he was selected in Germany’s 26-man squad for the 2026 FIFA World Cup.

== Career statistics ==
=== Club ===
As of match played 31 October 2026

Appearances and goals by club, season and competition
Club	Season	League			DFB-Pokal		Europe		Other		Total	
Club	Season	Division	Apps	Goals	Apps	Goals	Apps	Goals	Apps	Goals	Apps	Goals
Greuther Fürth II	2016–17	Regionalliga Bayern	5	0	—		—		4 (Note: Appearances in Regionalliga relegation play-offs)	1	9	1
Greuther Fürth II	2017–18	Regionalliga Bayern	5	0	—		—		—		5	0
Greuther Fürth II	2018–19	Regionalliga Bayern	5	1	—		—		—		5	1
Greuther Fürth II	2019–20	Regionalliga Bayern	1	0	—		—		—		1	0
Greuther Fürth II	Total		16	1	—		—		4	1	20	2
Greuther Fürth	2016–17	2. Bundesliga	5	0	0	0	—		—		5	0
Greuther Fürth	2017–18	2. Bundesliga	20	1	2	2	—		—		22	3
Greuther Fürth	2018–19	2. Bundesliga	16	1	0	0	—		—		16	1
Greuther Fürth	2019–20	2. Bundesliga	19	1	0	0	—		—		19	1
Greuther Fürth	2020–21	2. Bundesliga	34	1	3	0	—		—		37	1
Greuther Fürth	Total		94	4	5	2	—		—		99	6
TSG Hoffenheim	2021–22	Bundesliga	32	3	3	0	—		—		35	3
RB Leipzig	2022–23	Bundesliga	28	0	4	0	8 (Note: Appearances in UEFA Champions League)	0	—		40	0
RB Leipzig	2023–24	Bundesliga	31	2	1	0	7	1	1 (Note: Appearance in DFL-Supercup)	0	40	3
RB Leipzig	2024–25	Bundesliga	22	1	3	0	4	0	—		29	1
RB Leipzig	2025–26	Bundesliga	30	3	4	0	—		—		34	3
RB Leipzig	2026–27	Bundesliga	7	0	2	0	3	0	—		12	0
RB Leipzig	Total		118	6	14	0	22	1	1	0	155	7
Career total			260	14	22	2	22	1	5	1	309	18

=== International ===
As of match played 4 October 2026

Appearances and goals by national team and year
National team	Year	Apps	Goals
Germany	2021	3	0
Germany	2022	12	0
Germany	2023	4	0
Germany	2024	7	0
Germany	2025	8	1
Germany	2026	6	0
Total		40	1

As of match played 10 October 2025
Germany score listed first, score column indicates score after each Raum goal.

List of international goals scored by David Raum
No.	Date	Venue	Cap	Opponent	Score	Result	Competition
1	10 October 2025	Rhein-Neckar-Arena, Sinsheim, Germany	31	Luxembourg	1–0	4–0	2026 FIFA World Cup qualification

== Honours ==
RB Leipzig

- DFB-Pokal: 2022–23
- DFL-Supercup: 2023

Germany U21

- UEFA European Under-21 Championship: 2021

Individual

- Bundesliga Team of the Season: 2021–22
- UEFA European Under-21 Championship Team of the Tournament: 2021
