= El Chadaille Bitshiabu =

French footballer (born 2005)

Personal information
- Full name: El Chadaille Bitshiabu Katshibuyi-Ndenga Ngana
- Date of birth: 16 May 2005 (age 21)
- Place of birth: Villeneuve-Saint-Georges, Val-de-Marne, France
- Height: 1.96 m (6 ft 5 in)
- Position: Centre-back

Team information
- Current team: Galatasaray (on loan from RB Leipzig)
- Number: 3

Youth career
- 2011–2016: US Saint-Denis
- 2016–2017: Boulogne-Billancourt
- 2017–2022: Paris Saint-Germain

Senior career*
Years	Team	Apps	(Gls)
2021–2023	Paris Saint-Germain	14	(0)
2022	Paris Saint-Germain II	3	(0)
2023–	RB Leipzig	38	(0)
2026–	→ Galatasaray (loan)	0	(0)

International career
2021–2022	France U17	9	(0)
2021–2022	France U18	6	(0)
2022–2024	France U19	5	(0)
2024	France U20	1	(0)
Medal record
Men's football
Representing France
UEFA European Under-17 Championship
Winner	2022 Israel
- * Club domestic league appearances and goals as of 2 May 2026

El Chadaille Bitshiabu Katshibuyi-Ndenga Ngana (born 16 May 2005) is a French professional footballer who plays as a centre-back for Süper Lig club Galatasaray, on loan from Bundesliga club RB Leipzig.

== Early life ==
El Chadaille Bitshiabu Katshibuyi-Ndenga Ngana was born on 16 May 2005 in Villeneuve-Saint-Georges, Val-de-Marne in France. He is of DR Congolese descent.

== Club career ==
=== Paris Saint-Germain ===
Bitshiabu is a former youth player of US Saint-Denis and Boulogne-Billancourt. He joined the Paris Saint-Germain Academy in 2017. He caught attention of the media during a friendly tournament later that year due to his exceptional height at that age.

On 27 July 2020, Bitshiabu signed a three-year aspiring contract with Paris Saint-Germain. He made his first appearance for the senior team the following week on 5 August, in a 1–0 friendly win over Sochaux. On 29 July 2021, Bitshiabu signed his first professional contract, tying him to the club until June 2024. He made his debut for the club in a 3–0 Coupe de France win over Feignies Aulnoye on 19 December 2021. His debut at the age of 16 years and 213 days made him the youngest player to appear in an official match for the club, a record which was previously held by Kingsley Coman. On 20 April 2022, he made his Ligue 1 debut as a substitute in a 3–0 away win over Angers.

On 28 December 2022, Bitshiabu made his first Ligue 1 start for PSG in a 2–1 home win over Strasbourg, playing as a left-back to fill in for the late withdrawal of Juan Bernat due to injury. After the match, manager Christophe Galtier hailed Bitshiabu's performance as "very good". On 8 March 2023, he made his UEFA Champions League debut in a 2–0 defeat against Bayern Munich in the round of 16 second leg, replacing the injured Nordi Mukiele at half-time.

=== RB Leipzig ===
On 18 July 2023, Bitshiabu signed for Bundesliga club RB Leipzig on a five-year contract, and was assigned the number 5 jersey. The reported transfer fee was €15 million, with an additional €5 million in potential bonuses.

On 2 September 2026, Turkish Süper Lig giants Galatasaray announced the initiation of official negotiations with Bitshiabu and his club, RB Leipzig, regarding his imminent transfer. Bitshiabu arrived in Istanbul on the same day.

On the same day, he signed a loan agreement with Galatasaray running until the end of the 2026–27 season. Under the agreement, the temporary transfer fee has been set at €2,000,000. The purchase option fee is €28,000,000.

== International career ==
Bitshiabu is a French youth international. He started to receive call-ups to French youth teams in January 2020. In 2021, Bitshiabu was called up to play for the France under-18s for the Tournoi International de Limoges.

== Career statistics ==
As of match played 2 May 2026

Appearances and goals by club, season and competition
Club	Season	League			National cup (Note: Includes Coupe de France, DFB-Pokal)		Europe		Other		Total	
Club	Season	Division	Apps	Goals	Apps	Goals	Apps	Goals	Apps	Goals	Apps	Goals
Paris Saint-Germain	2021–22	Ligue 1	1	0	2	0	0	0	0	0	3	0
Paris Saint-Germain	2022–23	Ligue 1	13	0	2	0	1 (Note: Appearance(s) in UEFA Champions League)	0	0	0	16	0
Paris Saint-Germain	Total		14	0	4	0	1	0	0	0	19	0
Paris Saint-Germain II	2021–22	Championnat National 3	3	0	—		—		—		3	0
RB Leipzig	2023–24	Bundesliga	6	0	0	0	0	0	0	0	6	0
RB Leipzig	2024–25	Bundesliga	21	0	3	0	4	0	0	0	28	0
RB Leipzig	2025–26	Bundesliga	11	0	3	0	—		—		14	0
RB Leipzig	Total		38	0	6	0	4	0	0	0	48	0
Career total			55	0	10	0	5	0	0	0	70	0

== Honours ==
Paris Saint-Germain

- Ligue 1: 2021–22, 2022–23

France U17

- UEFA European Under-17 Championship: 2022
