= Faik Sakar =

German footballer (born 2008)

Personal information
- Full name: Faik Gazi Jonas Sakar
- Date of birth: 14 January 2008 (age 18)
- Place of birth: Berlin, Germany
- Height: 1.76 m (5 ft 9 in)
- Positions: Midfielder; forward

Team information
- Current team: FC Augsburg
- Number: 23

Youth career
- 2021–2022: SF Charlottenburg-Wilmersdorf
- 2022–2026: RB Leipzig

Senior career*
| Years | Team | Apps | (Gls) |
| 2024–2026 | RB Leipzig | 1 | (0) |
| 2026– | FC Augsburg | 0 | (0) |

International career^{‡}
| 2023 | Germany U15 | 2 | (0) |
| 2023 | Germany U16 | 4 | (0) |
| 2025 | Germany U17 | 1 | (0) |
- * Club domestic league appearances and goals as of 5 September 2025 ‡ National team caps and goals as of 17:20, 7 December 2024 (UTC)

Faik Gazi Jonas Sakar (born 14 January 2008) is a German professional footballer who plays as a midfielder or forward for Bundesliga club FC Augsburg.

== Career ==
A youth product of SF Charlottenburg-Wilmersdorf, Sakar joined the youth academy of RB Leipzig in 2022 and started training with their senior team in 2024. He made his senior and professional debut with RB Leipzig as a substitute in a 2–0 Bundesliga win over Holstein Kiel on 7 December 2024.

On 23 April 2026, Sakar signed a four-year contract with FC Augsburg, starting in the 2026–27 season.

== Personal life ==
Sakar was born in Germany to a German-born Turkish father and French-born Cameroonian mother. He is a youth international for Germany, having been called up to the Germany U16s for friendlies in 2023.

== Career statistics ==
As of match played 7 December 2024

Appearances and goals by club, season and competition
| Club | Season | League | | | Cup | | Europe | | Other | | Total | |
| Club | Season | Division | Apps | Goals | Apps | Goals | Apps | Goals | Apps | Goals | Apps | Goals |
|---|---|---|---|---|---|---|---|---|---|---|---|---|
| RB Leipzig | 2024–25 | Bundesliga | 1 | 0 | 0 | 0 | 0 | 0 | 0 | 0 | 1 | 0 |
| Career total | | | 1 | 0 | 0 | 0 | 0 | 0 | 0 | 0 | 1 | 0 |
