= Leopold Zingerle =

German footballer

Personal information
- Date of birth: 10 April 1994 (age 32)
- Place of birth: Munich, Germany
- Height: 1.85 m (6 ft 1 in)
- Position: Goalkeeper

Team information
- Current team: RB Leipzig
- Number: 25

Youth career
- 2002–2013: Bayern Munich

Senior career*
Years	Team	Apps	(Gls)
2012–2015	Bayern Munich II	50	(0)
2014–2015	Bayern Munich	0	(0)
2015–2016	Greuther Fürth	0	(0)
2015–2016	Greuther Fürth II	12	(0)
2016–2017	1. FC Magdeburg	21	(0)
2017–2023	SC Paderborn	134	(0)
2023–	RB Leipzig	0	(0)

International career
2012	Germany U18	1	(0)
2013	Germany U19	1	(0)
2013	Germany U20	1	(0)
- * Club domestic league appearances and goals as of 10 June 2023

Leopold Zingerle (born 10 April 1994) is a German professional footballer who plays as a goalkeeper for Bundesliga club RB Leipzig.

== Playing career ==
Zingerle was born and raised in Munich. He spent his entire career as a youth footballer with Bayern Munich, making it all the way to becoming the first-choice goalkeeper for the club's reserve team and frequently training with the first team during that time. As the fourth-choice goalkeeper in the first team during the 2013–14 season, he was named on the bench for a Bundesliga match at Augsburg in April 2014, due to injuries to Tom Starke and Lukas Raeder. However, he did not manage to make an appearance for the first team in a competitive match and left Bayern Munich in the summer of 2015, after spending 13 years at the club.

Zingerle went on to join Greuther Fürth of the 2. Bundesliga, but only managed to make 12 appearances for their reserves in the fourth tier of German football. He left the club for 1. FC Magdeburg of the 3. Liga ahead of the 2016–17 season, during which he appeared in a total of 21 league matches.

In the summer of 2017, Zingerle moved to SC Paderborn 07, who also competed in the 3. Liga at the time, and went on to be the club's first-choice goalkeeper over the next four seasons. During his first two seasons with SC Paderborn 07, the club got promoted twice, which allowed him to make his debut in the Bundesliga and appear in a total of 28 matches in the top flight in 2019–20. Following the club's relegation back to the 2. Bundesliga at the end of that season, Zingerle kept his place as a regular and signed a two-year contract extension in February 2021.

At the start of the 2021–22 season, he lost his place as a regular to Jannik Huth and did not make league appearances until 2022–23, when he played in four matches in the 2. Bundesliga. On 7 June 2023, it was confirmed that he would join Bundesliga club RB Leipzig upon the expiration of his Paderborn contract on 30 June 2023. He was expected to serve as the club's third-choice goalkeeper, behind Péter Gulácsi and Janis Blaswich.

== Career statistics ==
As of match played 13 November 2022

Appearances and goals by club, season and competition
Club	Season	League			DFB-Pokal		Europe		Other		Total	
Club	Season	Division	Apps	Goals	Apps	Goals	Apps	Goals	Apps	Goals	Apps	Goals
Bayern Munich II	2011–12	Regionalliga	0	0	—		—		—		0	0
Bayern Munich II	2012–13	Regionalliga	17	0	—		—		—		0	0
Bayern Munich II	2013–14	Regionalliga	10	0	—		—		—		0	0
Bayern Munich II	2014–15	Regionalliga	23	0	—		—		—		0	0
Bayern Munich II	2015–16	Regionalliga	0	0	—		—		—		0	0
Bayern Munich II	Total		50	0	—		—		—		50	0
Bayern Munich	2013–14	Bundesliga	0	0	0	0	0	0	0	0	0	0
Bayern Munich	2014–15	Bundesliga	0	0	0	0	0	0	0	0	0	0
Bayern Munich	Total		0	0	0	0	0	0	0	0	0	0
Greuther Fürth	2015–16	2. Bundesliga	0	0	—		—		—		0	0
Greuther Fürth II	2015–16	Regionalliga	12	0	—		—		—		12	0
1. FC Magdeburg	2016–17	3. Liga	21	0	1	0	—		—		22	0
SC Paderborn	2017–18	3. Liga	35	0	0	0	—		—		35	0
SC Paderborn	2018–19	2. Bundesliga	34	0	1	0	—		—		35	0
SC Paderborn	2019–20	Bundesliga	28	0	0	0	—		—		28	0
SC Paderborn	2020–21	2. Bundesliga	33	0	3	0	—		—		36	0
SC Paderborn	2021–22	2. Bundesliga	0	0	0	0	—		—		49	0
SC Paderborn	2022–23	2. Bundesliga	4	0	2	0	—		—		6	0
SC Paderborn	Total		134	0	6	0	—		—		140	0
RB Leipzig	2023–24	Bundesliga	0	0	0	0	0	0	0	0	0	0
RB Leipzig	2024–25	Bundesliga	0	0	0	0	0	0	0	0	0	0
RB Leipzig	2025–26	Bundesliga	0	0	0	0	—		—		0	0
RB Leipzig	Total		0	0	0	0	0	0	0	0	0	0
Career total			217	0	7	0	0	0	0	0	224	0

== Honours ==
RB Leipzig

- DFL-Supercup: 2023
