= Nicolas Seiwald =

Austrian footballer (born 2001)

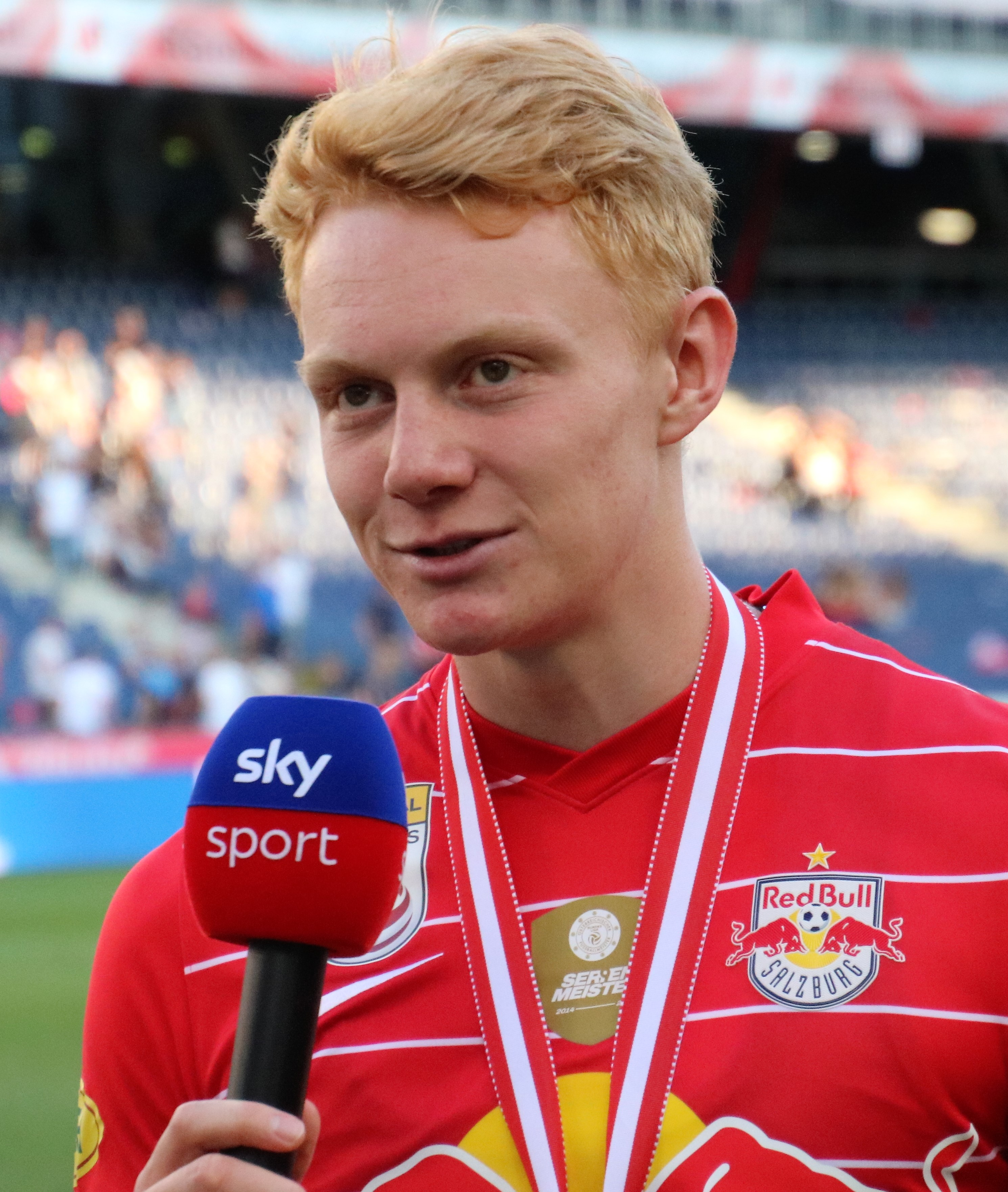
- Seiwald with Red Bull Salzburg in 2022

Personal information
- Date of birth: 4 May 2001 (age 25)
- Place of birth: Kuchl, Austria
- Height: 1.80 m (5 ft 11 in)
- Position: Defensive midfielder

Team information
- Current team: RB Leipzig
- Number: 13

Youth career
- 2009–2019: Red Bull Salzburg

Senior career*
Years	Team	Apps	(Gls)
2019–2020	FC Liefering	37	(5)
2020–2023	Red Bull Salzburg	78	(3)
2023–	RB Leipzig	91	(0)

International career^{‡}
2015	Austria U15	2	(1)
2017–2018	Austria U17	9	(0)
2018	Austria U18	1	(0)
2020	Austria U19	1	(0)
2021–	Austria U21	9	(2)
2021–	Austria	57	(1)
- * Club domestic league appearances and goals as of 17:30, 31 October 2026 (UTC) ‡ National team caps and goals as of 22:22, 17 November 2026 (UTC)

Nicolas Seiwald (born 4 May 2001) is an Austrian professional footballer who plays as a defensive midfielder for Bundesliga club RB Leipzig and the Austria national team.

== Club career ==
=== Red Bull Salzburg ===
Seiwald began his career in 2009 with the youth academy of Red Bull Salzburg. He made his professional debut playing for Red Bull Salzburg's feeder team, FC Liefering, against WSG Wattens on 24 May 2019. He made his league debut on 21 November 2020 as a starter against Sturm Graz. On 11 October 2022, Seiwald scored his first Champions League goal in a 1–1 away draw against Dinamo Zagreb.

=== RB Leipzig ===
On 26 February 2023, Seiwald joined German side RB Leipzig for the 2023–24 season, signing a five-year contract with the club.

== International career ==
Having represented Austria at various youth levels, Seiwald debuted for Austria national football team on 12 November 2021 in a World Cup qualifier against Israel.

On 18 May 2026, Seiwald was selected in Ralf Rangnick’s 26-man squad for the 2026 FIFA World Cup, marking Austria’s first appearance in the tournament since 1998.

== Career statistics ==
=== Club ===
As of match played 31 October 2026

Appearances and goals by club, season and competition
Club	Season	League			National cup (Note: Includes Austrian Cup, DFB-Pokal)		Europe		Other		Total	
Club	Season	Division	Apps	Goals	Apps	Goals	Apps	Goals	Apps	Goals	Apps	Goals
FC Liefering	2018–19	Austrian 2. Liga	3	0	—		—		—		3	0
FC Liefering	2019–20	Austrian 2. Liga	23	3	—		—		—		23	3
FC Liefering	2020–21	Austrian 2. Liga	11	2	—		—		—		11	2
FC Liefering	Total		37	5	—		—		—		37	5
Red Bull Salzburg	2020–21	Austrian Bundesliga	15	0	3	0	0	0	—		18	0
Red Bull Salzburg	2021–22	Austrian Bundesliga	32	0	5	1	10 (Note: Appearances in UEFA Champions League)	0	—		47	1
Red Bull Salzburg	2022–23	Austrian Bundesliga	31	3	4	0	7	0	—		42	3
Red Bull Salzburg	Total		78	3	12	1	17	0	—		107	4
RB Leipzig	2023–24	Bundesliga	21	0	1	0	4	0	1 (Note: Appearance in DFL-Supercup)	0	27	0
RB Leipzig	2024–25	Bundesliga	30	0	4	0	7	0	—		41	0
RB Leipzig	2025–26	Bundesliga	33	0	4	0	—		—		37	0
RB Leipzig	2026–27	Bundesliga	7	0	2	0	3	0	—		12	0
RB Leipzig	Total		91	0	11	0	14	0	1	0	118	0
Career total			206	8	23	1	31	0	1	0	261	9

=== International ===
As of match played 17 November 2026

Appearances and goals by national team and year
National team	Year	Apps	Goals
Austria	2021	2	0
Austria	2022	8	0
Austria	2023	10	0
Austria	2024	14	0
Austria	2025	10	0
Austria	2026	13	1
Total		57	1

Austria score listed first, score column indicates score after each Seiwald goal.

List of international goals scored by Nicolas Seiwald
No.	Date	Venue	Opponent	Score	Result	Competition
1	27 March 2026	Ernst-Happel-Stadion, Vienna, Austria	Ghana	5–1	5–1	Friendly

== Honours ==
Red Bull Salzburg Youth

- Jugendliga U18: 2019

Red Bull Salzburg

- Austrian Bundesliga: 2020–21, 2021–22
- Austrian Cup: 2020–21, 2021–22

RB Leipzig

- DFL-Supercup: 2023

Individual

- Austrian Bundesliga Breakthrough Player of the Year: 2021–22
- Austrian Bundesliga Team of the Year: 2021–22
