= Nuha Jatta =

German footballer (born 2006)

Personal information
- Full name: Nuha David Fred Jatta
- Date of birth: 15 March 2006 (age 20)
- Place of birth: Osnabrück, Germany
- Height: 1.93 m (6 ft 4 in)
- Positions: Attacking midfielder; winger

Team information
- Current team: Torreense

Youth career
- 2018–2020: VfL Osnabrück
- 2020–2024: RB Leipzig
- 2025: → Torino (loan)

Senior career*
| Years | Team | Apps | (Gls) |
| 2024–2025 | RB Leipzig | 1 | (0) |
| 2025–2026 | VfB Stuttgart II | 8 | (1) |
| 2026– | Torreense | 7 | (0) |

International career^{‡}
| 2024 | Germany U18 | 4 | (1) |
| 2024 | Germany U19 | 5 | (0) |
- * Club domestic league appearances and goals as of 31 October 2026 ‡ National team caps and goals as of 15 October 2024

Nuha David Fred Jatta (born 15 March 2006) is a German professional footballer who plays as an attacking midfielder and winger for Liga Portugal 2 club Torreense. He is a former Germany youth international.

== Club career ==
=== RB Leipzig ===
Jatta was transferred from VfL Osnabrück to RB Leipzig's youth academy in the summer of 2020. He impressed at the 2023–24 winter training camp for the professionals, subsequently becoming a permanent fixture in their training sessions and also featuring in the squad, for the UEFA Champions League round of 16 against Spanish La Liga club Real Madrid. On his 18th birthday in mid-March 2024, he then signed a professional contract running until 30 June 2027. He was also called up to RB Leipzig's professional squad by head coach Marco Rose at the end of the 2023–24 Bundesliga season. He then made his first competitive appearance in the Bundesliga during the away match against Eintracht Frankfurt on 18 May 2024, when he was substituted for Benjamin Šeško in the 11th minute of stoppage time.

==== Loan to Torino ====
On 3 February 2025, he moved to Italian Serie A club Torino, on a six-month loan for the rest of the 2024–25 season, although he only featured with the Primavera during his spell with the club.

=== VfB Stuttgart ===
On 9 August 2025, Jatta signed with VfB Stuttgart, immediately assigned to their reserve team in the 3. Liga, after returning from his loan-spell at Italy.

=== Torreense ===
On 3 July 2026, he moved to Portugal, signing with second division club Torreense, joining the club after their historic win against Primeira Liga giants Sporting CP 2–1 in the Taça de Portugal final, winning a major domestic honour for the first time in the club's history and securing qualification for the UEFA Europa League as the first non-top flight club to qualify for the revised league phase and the third non-top flight Portuguese club to qualify for the UEFA Europa League after Beira-Mar and Leixões.

On 17 September 2026, Jatta substituted Manu Pozo during the second half of Torreense's 2–1 2026–27 UEFA Europa League league phase match win over Norwegian Eliteserien side Lillestrom, winning on the club's European debut in any competition, he was sent off at the 85th minute however.

== International career ==
Jatta was called up to the Germany U18s in May 2024.
