= 2023 DFL-Supercup =

German Supercup
- Event: DFL-Supercup
Bayern Munich	RB Leipzig
0	3
- Date: 12 August 2023
- Venue: Allianz Arena, Munich
- Referee: Bastian Dankert (Rostock)
- Attendance: 75,000

The 2023 DFL-Supercup was the 14th edition of the German super cup under the name DFL-Supercup, an annual football match contested by the winners of the previous season's Bundesliga and DFB-Pokal competitions. The match was played on 12 August 2023.

The match featured Bayern Munich, winners of the 2022–23 Bundesliga, and RB Leipzig, winners of the 2022–23 DFB-Pokal. It was a rematch of the 2022 edition, which Bayern won 5–3. Though usually hosted by the DFB-Pokal winners, the Deutsche Fußball Liga selected Bayern Munich to host the match at the Allianz Arena in Munich.

RB Leipzig won the match 3–0 for their first DFL-Supercup title.

== Teams ==
In the following table, matches until 1996 were in the DFB-Supercup era, since 2010 were in the DFL-Supercup era.

Team	Qualification	Previous appearances (bold indicates winners)
Bayern Munich^{TH}	2022–23 Bundesliga champions	16 (**1987**, 1989, **1990**, 1994, **2010**, **2012**, 2013, 2014, 2015, **2016**, **2017**, **2018**, 2019, **2020**, **2021**, **2022**) (Note: Runners-up in the unofficial 2008 German Supercup. Six-time winners and one-time runners-up in the DFL-Ligapokal.)
RB Leipzig	2022–23 DFB-Pokal winners	1 (2022)

== Match ==
=== Summary ===
Dani Olmo put RB Leipzig into the lead after three minutes, with a low finish into the bottom right-hand corner of the net. Bayern Munich had a chance at the other end in the 10th minute after Serge Gnabry was put through on goal by Joshua Kimmich, but his effort was saved comfortably by Janis Blaswich. In the 15th minute, Gnabry came forward again for Bayern and played a ball across to Mathys Tel who forced a strong save from Blaswich. Eight minutes later, Gnabry and Tel combined again with Gnabry playing another ball across to Tel only for him to strike the ball too high over the goal. In the 44th minute, Leipzig doubled their lead through another goal from Olmo after he managed to evade defender Matthijs de Ligt before being left one-on-one with Sven Ulreich and slot the ball under the goalkeeper and into the net to make it 2–0 at halftime. As the second half progressed, Bayern continued to press for a goal with a wide effort from Leroy Sané, a save from Blaswich against Tel, and a missed opportunity from Jamal Musiala. Leipzig were awarded a penalty by referee Bastian Dankert in the 66th minute after defender Noussair Mazraoui appeared to have struck the ball with his hand inside the penalty area. Olmo scored the penalty down the bottom left-hand corner of the net to complete his hat-trick and make it 3–0. Benjamin Šeško nearly made it four in the 88th minute after being put through on goal by Fábio Carvalho, but his resulting effort was tipped over by Ulreich. The match concluded as Leipzig won the Supercup with a 3–0 victory.

=== Details ===
12 August 2023
20:45 CEST

Bayern Munich	0–3	RB Leipzig
	Report	Olmo 3', 44', 68' (pen.)

Allianz Arena, Munich
Attendance: 75,000
Referee: Bastian Dankert (Rostock)

**Bayern Munich**	**RB Leipzig**

GK	26	(Germany) Sven Ulreich
RB	5	(France) Benjamin Pavard	(yellow card) 14'	(substituted off) 46'
CB	2	(France) Dayot Upamecano	(yellow card) 34'
CB	4	(Netherlands) Matthijs de Ligt		(substituted off) 46'
LB	19	(Canada) Alphonso Davies
CM	27	(Austria) Konrad Laimer		(substituted off) 46'
CM	6	(Germany) Joshua Kimmich (c)		(substituted off) 78'
RW	10	(Germany) Leroy Sané
AM	42	(Germany) Jamal Musiala
LW	7	(Germany) Serge Gnabry
CF	39	(France) Mathys Tel		(substituted off) 63'
Substitutes:
GK	43	(Germany) Tom Ritzy Hülsmann
DF	3	(South Korea) Kim Min-jae		(substituted on) 46'
DF	40	(Morocco) Noussair Mazraoui		(substituted on) 46'
DF	41	(Germany) Frans Krätzig
MF	8	(Germany) Leon Goretzka		(substituted on) 78'
MF	38	(Netherlands) Ryan Gravenberch
MF	45	(Germany) Aleksandar Pavlović
FW	9	(England) Harry Kane		(substituted on) 63'
FW	11	(France) Kingsley Coman		(substituted on) 46'
Manager:
(Germany) Thomas Tuchel

GK	21	(Germany) Janis Blaswich
RB	39	(Germany) Benjamin Henrichs		(substituted off) 85'
CB	2	(France) Mohamed Simakan
CB	4	(Hungary) Willi Orbán (c)
LB	22	(Germany) David Raum
CM	13	(Austria) Nicolas Seiwald
CM	24	(Austria) Xaver Schlager
RW	20	(Netherlands) Xavi Simons		(substituted off) 78'
LW	7	(Spain) Dani Olmo	(yellow card) 71'	(substituted off) 78'
CF	11	(Germany) Timo Werner		(substituted off) 64'
CF	17	(Belgium) Loïs Openda		(substituted off) 64'
Substitutes:
GK	25	(Germany) Leopold Zingerle
DF	16	(Germany) Lukas Klostermann		(substituted on) 85'
DF	23	(France) Castello Lukeba
MF	10	(Sweden) Emil Forsberg		(substituted on) 78'
MF	18	(Portugal) Fábio Carvalho		(substituted on) 78'
MF	38	(Spain) Hugo Novoa
MF	44	(Slovenia) Kevin Kampl
FW	30	(Slovenia) Benjamin Šeško		(substituted on) 64'
FW	9	(Denmark) Yussuf Poulsen		(substituted on) 64'
Manager:
(Germany) Marco Rose

Assistant referees:
René Rohde (Rostock)
Marcel Unger (Hamburg)
Fourth official:
Tobias Reichel (Stuttgart)
Video assistant referee:
Tobias Welz (Wiesbaden)
Assistant video assistant referee:
Thorsten Schiffner (Konstanz)

**Match rules**

- 90 minutes.
- Penalty shoot-out if scores level.
- Nine named substitutes, of which up to five may be used.

== See also ==
- 2023–24 Bundesliga
- 2023–24 DFB-Pokal
