= 2026–27 Borussia Mönchengladbach season =

German football club season

Borussia Mönchengladbach
2026–27 season
- President: Rainer Bonhof
- Head coach: Eugen Polanski (until 13 September 2026); Jan-Moritz Lichte (Caretaker); Alexander Blessin (from 22 September 2026)
- Stadium: Borussia-Park
- Bundesliga: 18th
- DFB-Pokal: Second round
- Top goalscorer: League: All: Hugo Bolin (2)
- Biggest win: 5–0 v. Schott Mainz (A); DFB-Pokal, 23 August 2026
- Biggest defeat: 5–0 v. SC Freiburg (A); Bundesliga, 12 September 2026
Home colours	Away colours	Third colours

The 2026–27 season is Borussia Mönchengladbach's 127th overall and their 19th consecutive season in the top flight of German football. In addition to the Bundesliga, the club would also participate in the DFB-Pokal.

Following the heavy loss against Freiburg, Polanski and his assistant coach, Tobias Trulsen, were dismissed on 13 September 2026. Jan-Moritz Lichte was named as the interim head coach on the same day.

On 22 September 2026, the club announced the appointment of Alexander Blessin as the new head coach with a contract running until 2028.

== First-team squad ==
As of 1 September 2026

Note: Flags indicate national team as defined under FIFA eligibility rules; some limited exceptions apply. Players may hold more than one non-FIFA nationality.

No.	Pos.	Nation	Player
1	GK	GER	Moritz Nicolas
2	DF	ITA	Fabio Chiarodia
3	FW	SWE	Isac Lidberg
4	DF	IDN	Kevin Diks (vice-captain)
5	DF	POL	Jan Leszczyński
6	DF	JPN	Kō Itakura
7	MF	AUT	Kevin Stöger
8	MF	GER	Enzo Leopold
9	MF	FRA	Franck Honorat
10	MF	GER	Florian Neuhaus
11	FW	GER	Tim Kleindienst (captain)
14	DF	JPN	Daiki Hashioka
16	MF	GER	Philipp Sander
17	MF	KOR	Jens Castrop
18	FW	JPN	Shūto Machino

No.	Pos.	Nation	Player
19	FW	GER	Nicolas Kühn
20	DF	GER	David Herold
21	GK	GER	Tobias Sippel
22	DF	UKR	Yukhym Konoplya
23	GK	GER	Jan Olschowsky
25	MF	GER	Robin Hack
27	MF	GER	Fritz Fleck
26	DF	GER	Lukas Ullrich
29	DF	USA	Joe Scally
33	GK	GER	Daniel Batz
34	MF	GER	Mathieu Nguefack
36	MF	GER	Wael Mohya
38	MF	SWE	Hugo Bolin
39	FW	GBS	Iaia Manco Danfa
47	MF	JPN	Zento Uno

== Transfers and contracts ==
=== In ===
Date	Pos.	No.	Player	From	Fee	Ref.
1 July 2026	CF	3	(Sweden) Isac Lidberg	(Germany) Darmstadt 98	€3,500,000	
1 July 2026	CM	8	(Germany) Enzo Leopold	(Germany) Hannover 96	Free transfer	
1 July 2026	LB	20	(Germany) David Herold	(Germany) Karlsruher SC	€3,500,000	
1 July 2026	RB	22	(Ukraine) Yukhym Konoplya	(Ukraine) Shakhtar Donetsk	Free transfer	
1 July 2026	GK	33	(Germany) Daniel Batz	(Germany) Mainz 05	Free transfer	
1 July 2026	LM	38	(Sweden) Hugo Bolin	(Sweden) Malmö FF	€2,000,000	
1 July 2026	DM	47	(Japan) Zento Uno	(Japan) Shimizu S-Pulse	€500,000	
3 July 2026	CB	5	(Poland) Jan Leszczyński	(Poland) Legia Warsaw	€3,000,000	
20 August 2026	CB	6	(Japan) Kō Itakura	(Netherlands) Ajax	€3,500,000	
▼ Spending: €16,000,000

=== Out ===
Date	Pos.	No.	Player	To	Fee	Ref.
1 July 2026	GK	1	(Switzerland) Jonas Omlin	(Switzerland) Basel	Free transfer	
1 July 2026	CB	5	(Germany) Marvin Friedrich	(Germany) Union Berlin	Free transfer	
1 July 2026	CM	27	(Germany) Rocco Reitz	(Germany) RB Leipzig	€20,000,000	
1 July 2026	CF	—	(Japan) Shiō Fukuda	(Germany) Karlsruher SC	€700,000	
3 July 2026	AM	—	(Croatia) Noah Pesch	(Germany) Rot-Weiss Essen	Undisclosed	
17 July 2026	CF	28	(Armenia) Grant-Leon Ranos	(Spain) Tenerife	€300,000	
4 August 2026	AM	13	(United States) Giovanni Reyna	(France) Strasbourg	€3,000,000	
17 August 2026	RW	19	(Cameroon) Nathan Ngoumou	(France) Nice	Free transfer	
19 August 2026	CB	30	(Switzerland) Nico Elvedi	(England) Leeds United	€8,000,000	
▲ Income: €32,000,000 + Undisclosed fees

=== Loans in ===
Date	Pos.	No.	Player	From	Date until	Ref.
30 July 2026	RB	14	(Japan) Daiki Hashioka	(Czech Republic) Slavia Prague	30 June 2027	
1 September 2026	RW	19	(Germany) Nicolas Kühn	(Italy) Como	30 June 2027	

=== Loans out ===
Date	Pos.	No.	Player	To	Date until	Ref.
1 July 2026	DM	39	(Germany) Niklas Swider	(Germany) Viktoria Köln	30 June 2027	
1 July 2026	CF	40	(Germany) Jan Urbich	(Germany) Eintracht Braunschweig	30 June 2027	
1 July 2026	GK	42	(Luxembourg) Tiago Pereira Cardoso	(Belgium) La Louvière	30 June 2027	
3 September 2026	CF	31	(Czech Republic) Tomáš Čvančara	(Czech Republic) Hradec Králové	30 June 2027	

=== New contracts ===
Date	Pos.	No.	Player	Date until	Ref.
12 June 2026	CB	2	(Italy) Fabio Chiarodia	30 June 2028	
12 June 2026	CF	40	(Germany) Jan Urbich	30 June 2029	
23 June 2026	DM	39	(Germany) Niklas Swider	30 June 2028	

== Pre-season and friendlies ==
On 29 May 2026, Gladbach announced their pre-season schedule, including fixtures against Rot-Weiss Essen and Hansa Rostock, and an eight-day training camp in Tegernsee. Five days later, an additional friendly against Wuppertaler SV was added to the pre-season programme. On 5 June 2026, English side Aston Villa were confirmed to be the opponents in Gladbach's traditional season opener, while an extra friendly game away to SSVg Velbert was announced on 15 July 2026. The pre-season fixtures were completed by two friendlies at the training camp versus FC Rottach-Egern and TSG Hoffenheim.

Win Draw Loss Fixtures

18 July 2026 Friendly	Wuppertaler SV	0–6	Borussia Mönchengladbach	Wuppertal
14:00 CEST	Goles (yellow card) 52'	Report	Bolin 8', 15'; Honorat 61', 76'; Hack 65' (pen.); Danfa 83'	Stadium: Stadion am Zoo; Attendance: 4,600; Referee: Robin Braun

25 July 2026 Friendly	Rot-Weiss Essen	1–2	Borussia Mönchengladbach	Essen
14:00 CEST	Bouebari (yellow card) 11'; Biber 90+2' (o.g.)	Report	Bolin 45+1'; Mohya 74'; Lidberg (yellow card) 90+1'	Stadium: Stadion an der Hafenstraße; Attendance: 8,821; Referee: Robin Braun

1 August 2026 Friendly	Hansa Rostock	1–3	Borussia Mönchengladbach	Rostock
14:00 CEST	Kölle 90'	Report	Neuhaus (yellow card) 7'; Ullrich 49'; Hashioka (yellow card) 49'; Stöger 58'; Berko (yellow card) 64'; Lidberg 70'	Stadium: Ostseestadion; Attendance: 20,004; Referee: Bastian Dankert

5 August 2026 Friendly	FC Rottach-Egern	0–15	Borussia Mönchengladbach	Rottach-Egern
18:00 CEST		Report	Mohya 4', 37'; Lidberg 19'; Danfa 33', 35'; Stöger 39'; Uno 42'; Machino 48', 72'; Castrop 49', 56'; Kleindienst 50', 84'; Neuhaus 53'; Honorat 77'	Stadium: Stadion am Birkenmoos; Attendance: 2,050; Referee: Luca Schultze

7 August 2026 Friendly	TSG Hoffenheim	1–4	Borussia Mönchengladbach	Schwaz, Austria
16:00 CEST	Conté 31'; Kabak (yellow card); Chaves (yellow card); Philipp (yellow card)	Report	Hack 76'; Lidberg 85', 105'; Neuhaus 112'; Nguefack (yellow card)	Stadium: Silberstadt-Arena; Attendance: 1,580; Referee: Matthias Gächter
Note: Two 60-minute halves game

12 August 2026 Friendly	SSVg Velbert	0–8	Borussia Mönchengladbach	Velbert
18:00 CEST		Report	Hack 11', 34'; Danfa 51'; Neuhaus 61', 84'; Vali Fard 63'; Machino 66' (pen.); Fleck 71'	Stadium: Stadion Velbert; Attendance: 2,100

15 August 2026 Friendly	Borussia Mönchengladbach	2–1	Aston Villa	Mönchengladbach
15:30 CEST	Kleindienst 32', 35'	Report	Alysson (yellow card) 11' (yellow-red card) 67'; McGinn (yellow card) 68', (goal) 69'	Stadium: Borussia-Park; Attendance: 50,148; Referee: Sascha Stegemann

== Competitions ==
=== Overall record ===
Competition	First match	Last match	Starting round	Record							
Competition	First match	Last match	Starting round	Pld	W	D	L	GF	GA	GD	Win %
Bundesliga	29 August 2026	22 May 2027	Matchday 1	9	1	1	7	12	25	−13	11.11
DFB-Pokal	23 August 2026	TBD	First round	2	2	0	0	7	0	+7	100.00
Total				11	3	1	7	19	25	−6	27.27

Last updated: 6 November 2026
Source: Soccerway

=== Bundesliga ===
==== League table ====
Pos	Team	Pld	W	D	L	GF	GA	GD	Pts	Qualification or relegation
14	SC Paderborn	10	2	4	4	8	15	−7	10	
15	FC Augsburg	9	2	3	4	20	20	0	9	
16	Union Berlin	10	1	4	5	8	26	−18	7	Qualification for the relegation play-offs
17	Schalke 04	9	1	3	5	5	11	−6	6	Relegation to 2. Bundesliga
18	Borussia Mönchengladbach	10	1	1	8	12	26	−14	4	Relegation to 2. Bundesliga

Updated to match(es) played on 21 November 2026. Source: Bundesliga
Rules for classification: 1) Points; 2) Goal difference; 3) Goals scored; 4) Head-to-head aggregate results; 5) Head-to-head away goals scored; 6) Away goals scored; 7) Play-off at neutral site.
(Rules 4–6 only apply after all home-and-away matches have been played between the tied teams. Rule 7 only applies after the completion of the season.)

==== Results summary ====
Overall								Home						Away					
Pld	W	D	L	GF	GA	GD	Pts	W	D	L	GF	GA	GD	W	D	L	GF	GA	GD
10	1	1	8	12	26	−14	4	0	1	4	7	11	−4	1	0	4	5	15	−10

Last updated: 21 November 2026.
Source: Soccerway

==== Results by round ====
Round	1	2	3	4	5	6	7	8	9	10	11	12	13	14	15	16	17	18	19	20	21	22	23	24	25	26	27	28	29	30	31	32	33	34
Ground	A	H	A	H	A	H	A	H	A	H	A	A	H	A	H	A	H	H	A	H	A	H	A	H	A	H	A	H	H	A	H	A	H	A
Result	L	L	L	L	L	L	W	D	L	L																								
Position	16	17	17	18	18	18	18	18	18	18																								
Points	0	0	0	0	0	0	3	4	4	4																								

Updated to match(es) played on 21 November 2026. Source: Bundesliga
A = Away; H = Home; W = Win; D = Draw; L = Loss; P = Postponed

==== Matches ====
The Bundesliga fixtures were released on 2 July 2026.

Win Draw Loss Fixtures

29 August 2026 1	RB Leipzig	3–0	Borussia Mönchengladbach	Leipzig
15:30 CEST	Baku 26'; Nusa 49', (yellow card) 72'; Reitz 66'	Report		Stadium: Red Bull Arena; Attendance: 47,800; Referee: Sven Jablonski

5 September 2026 2	Borussia Mönchengladbach	3–4	SV Elversberg	Mönchengladbach
15:30 CEST	Bolin 12', 44', (yellow card) 45+2'; Scally 56'; Nguefack (yellow card) 79'; Diks (yellow card) 89'	Report	Mokwa 29'; Krattenmacher 66', 90+2'; Keidel 80'; Condé (yellow card) 89'	Stadium: Borussia-Park; Attendance: 51,042; Referee: Martin Petersen

12 September 2026 3	SC Freiburg	5–0	Borussia Mönchengladbach	Freiburg im Breisgau
15:30 CEST	Engelhardt 23', 79'; Matanović 29', 77'; Eggestein 86'; Irié (yellow card) 90+2'	Report	Kleindienst (yellow card) 13' (yellow-red card) 52'; Diks (yellow card) 14'; Scally (yellow card) 90+2'	Stadium: Europa-Park Stadion; Attendance: 34,700; Referee: Richard Hempel

19 September 2026 4	Borussia Mönchengladbach	3–4	Mainz 05	Mönchengladbach
15:30 CEST	Neuhaus 11', (yellow card) 62'; Ullrich (yellow card) 19'; Honorat (yellow card) 55'; Lidberg 59'; Stöger (yellow card) 87'; Mohya (yellow card) 87'; Machino (yellow card) 90+3', (goal) 90+5' (pen.)	Report	Tietz 18'; Becker 45+1'; Posch (yellow card) 55'; Mwene (yellow card) 73'; Martel 78'; Da Costa 89'; Potulski (yellow card) 90+3'; Schwolow (yellow card) 90+4'; Königsdörffer (yellow card) 90+7'	Stadium: Borussia-Park; Attendance: 50,717; Referee: Robert Hartmann

10 October 2026 5	1. FC Köln	2–1	Borussia Mönchengladbach	Cologne
15:30 CEST	Bülter (yellow card) 13'; Jóhannesson 26'; El Mala 67'	Report	Leszczyński (yellow card) 24'; Scally 39'; Uno (yellow card) 81'; Machino (yellow card) 90+6'	Stadium: RheinEnergieStadion; Attendance: 50,000; Referee: Florian Badstübner

17 October 2026 6	Borussia Mönchengladbach	1–2	TSG Hoffenheim	Mönchengladbach
15:30 CEST	Diks (yellow card) 45'; Mohya 49'; Hack (yellow card) 89'; Machino (yellow card) 89'	Report	Conté 11'; Asllani (yellow card) 45+1'; Prass 54', (yellow card) 89'	Stadium: Borussia-Park; Attendance: 43,702; Referee: Sören Storks

24 October 2026 7	VfB Stuttgart	2–3	Borussia Mönchengladbach	Stuttgart
15:30 CEST	Demirović 5', 83'; Sauer (yellow card) 44'; Karazor (yellow card) 45'	Report	Scally 38', (yellow card) 54'; Neuhaus (yellow card) 45+3'; Machino 51'; Uno (yellow card) 53'; Mohya 66'; Ullrich (yellow card) 79'	Stadium: MHPArena; Referee: Matthias Jöllenbeck

31 October 2026 8	Borussia Mönchengladbach	0–0	SC Paderborn	Mönchengladbach
15:30 CET	Hashioka (yellow card) 41'; Chiarodia (yellow card) 50'	Report	Baack (yellow card) 29'; Scheller (yellow card) 81'; Ulrich (yellow card) 90+1'	Stadium: Borussia-Park; Attendance: 51,581; Referee: Timo Gerach

7 November 2026 9	Hamburger SV	3–1	Borussia Mönchengladbach	Hamburg
15:30 CET	Muheim 11'; Nandja 59'; Grønbæk 70'; Omari (yellow card) 90+3'	Report	Itakura (yellow card) 38' (yellow-red card) 49'; Hack 44'; Castrop (yellow card) 90+2'	Stadium: Volksparkstadion; Attendance: 57,000; Referee: Sven Jablonski

21 November 2026 10	Borussia Mönchengladbach	0–1	Borussia Dortmund	Mönchengladbach
15:30 CET	Uno (yellow card) 32'; Diks (yellow card) 72'	Report	Gadou (yellow card) 16'; Nmecha 80'	Stadium: Borussia-Park; Attendance: 54,546; Referee: Robert Hartmann

28 November 2026 11	Werder Bremen	v	Borussia Mönchengladbach	Bremen
15:30 CET		Report		Stadium: Weserstadion

5 December 2026 12	Bayer Leverkusen	v	Borussia Mönchengladbach	Leverkusen
15:30 CET		Report		Stadium: BayArena

12 December 2026 13	Borussia Mönchengladbach	v	Eintracht Frankfurt	Mönchengladbach
15:30 CET		Report		Stadium: Borussia-Park

19 December 2026 14	Schalke 04	v	Borussia Mönchengladbach	Gelsenkirchen
15:30 CET		Report		Stadium: Arena AufSchalke

9 January 2027 15	Borussia Mönchengladbach	v	Bayern Munich	Mönchengladbach
15:30 CET		Report		Stadium: Borussia-Park

13 January 2027 16	FC Augsburg	v	Borussia Mönchengladbach	Augsburg
15:30 CET		Report		Stadium: Augsburg Arena

16 January 2027 17	Borussia Mönchengladbach	v	Union Berlin	Mönchengladbach
15:30 CET		Report		Stadium: Borussia-Park

23 January 2027 18	Borussia Mönchengladbach	v	RB Leipzig	Mönchengladbach
15:30 CET		Report		Stadium: Borussia-Park

30 January 2027 19	SV Elversberg	v	Borussia Mönchengladbach	Spiesen-Elversberg
15:30 CET		Report		Stadium: Waldstadion an der Kaiserlinde

6 February 2027 20	Borussia Mönchengladbach	v	SC Freiburg	Mönchengladbach
15:30 CET		Report		Stadium: Borussia-Park

13 February 2027 21	Mainz 05	v	Borussia Mönchengladbach	Mainz
15:30 CET		Report		Stadium: Mewa Arena

20 February 2027 22	Borussia Mönchengladbach	v	1. FC Köln	Mönchengladbach
15:30 CET		Report		Stadium: Borussia-Park

27 February 2027 23	TSG Hoffenheim	v	Borussia Mönchengladbach	Sinsheim
15:30 CET		Report		Stadium: Rhein-Neckar-Arena

3 March 2027 24	Borussia Mönchengladbach	v	VfB Stuttgart	Mönchengladbach
15:30 CET		Report		Stadium: Borussia-Park

6 March 2027 25	SC Paderborn	v	Borussia Mönchengladbach	Paderborn
15:30 CET		Report		Stadium: Home Deluxe Arena

13 March 2027 26	Borussia Mönchengladbach	v	Hamburger SV	Mönchengladbach
15:30 CET		Report		Stadium: Borussia-Park

20 March 2027 27	Borussia Dortmund	v	Borussia Mönchengladbach	Dortmund
15:30 CET		Report		Stadium: Westfalenstadion

3 April 2027 28	Borussia Mönchengladbach	v	Werder Bremen	Mönchengladbach
15:30 CEST		Report		Stadium: Borussia-Park

10 April 2027 29	Borussia Mönchengladbach	v	Bayer Leverkusen	Mönchengladbach
15:30 CEST		Report		Stadium: Borussia-Park

17 April 2027 30	Eintracht Frankfurt	v	Borussia Mönchengladbach	Frankfurt
15:30 CEST		Report		Stadium: Waldstadion

24 April 2027 31	Borussia Mönchengladbach	v	Schalke 04	Mönchengladbach
15:30 CEST		Report		Stadium: Borussia-Park

8 May 2027 32	Bayern Munich	v	Borussia Mönchengladbach	Munich
15:30 CEST		Report		Stadium: Allianz Arena

15 May 2027 33	Borussia Mönchengladbach	v	FC Augsburg	Mönchengladbach
15:30 CEST		Report		Stadium: Borussia-Park

22 May 2027 34	Union Berlin	v	Borussia Mönchengladbach	Berlin
13:30 CEST		Report		Stadium: Stadion An der Alten Försterei

=== DFB-Pokal ===
Gladbach entered the DFB-Pokal in the first round, and were drawn away to fifth-tier Oberliga Rheinland-Pfalz/Saar side Schott Mainz. They were then drawn at home to 2. Bundesliga side Karlsruher SC.

Win Draw Loss Fixtures

23 August 2026 First round	Schott Mainz	0–5	Borussia Mönchengladbach	Mainz
15:30 CEST		Report	Bolin 22', 48'; Hashioka 26'; Diks (yellow card) 45+2'; Ullrich 61'; Mohya 67'	Stadium: Mewa Arena; Attendance: 18,500; Referee: Timo Gansloweit

27 October 2026 Second round	Borussia Mönchengladbach	2–0	Karlsruher SC	Mönchengladbach
20:45 CET	Hack 7'; Sander (red card) 39'; Ullrich 49'	Report		Stadium: Borussia-Park; Attendance: 43,034; Referee: Florian Lechner

== Statistics ==
As of match played 29 August 2026

=== Appearances ===
No.	Pos	Nat	Player	Total		Bundesliga		DFB-Pokal	
No.	Pos	Nat	Player	Apps	Goals	Apps	Goals	Apps	Goals
1	GK	(Germany) GER	Moritz Nicolas	2	0	1+0	0	1+0	0
2	DF	(Italy) ITA	Fabio Chiarodia	0	0	0+0	0	0+0	0
3	FW	(Sweden) SWE	Isac Lidberg	2	0	0+1	0	1+0	0
4	DF	(Indonesia) IDN	Kevin Diks	2	0	1+0	0	1+0	0
5	DF	(Poland) POL	Jan Leszczyński	1	0	0+0	0	1+0	0
6	DF	(Japan) JPN	Kō Itakura	2	0	1+0	0	0+1	0
7	MF	(Austria) AUT	Kevin Stöger	2	0	1+0	0	1+0	0
8	MF	(Germany) GER	Enzo Leopold	1	0	0+0	0	0+1	0
9	MF	(France) FRA	Franck Honorat	2	0	0+1	0	0+1	0
10	MF	(Germany) GER	Florian Neuhaus	0	0	0+0	0	0+0	0
11	FW	(Germany) GER	Tim Kleindienst	1	0	1+0	0	0+0	0
14	DF	(Japan) JPN	Daiki Hashioka	2	0	1+0	0	1+0	0
16	MF	(Germany) GER	Philipp Sander	2	0	1+0	0	1+0	0
17	MF	(South Korea) KOR	Jens Castrop	0	0	0+0	0	0+0	0
18	FW	(Japan) JPN	Shūto Machino	1	0	0+0	0	0+1	0
19	FW	(Germany) GER	Nicolas Kühn	0	0	0+0	0	0+0	0
20	DF	(Germany) GER	David Herold	2	0	0+1	0	0+1	0
21	GK	(Germany) GER	Tobias Sippel	0	0	0+0	0	0+0	0
22	DF	(Ukraine) UKR	Yukhym Konoplya	0	0	0+0	0	0+0	0
23	GK	(Germany) GER	Jan Olschowsky	0	0	0+0	0	0+0	0
25	MF	(Germany) GER	Robin Hack	2	0	1+0	0	1+0	0
26	DF	(Germany) GER	Lukas Ullrich	2	0	1+0	0	1+0	0
27	MF	(Germany) GER	Fritz Fleck	0	0	0+0	0	0+0	0
29	DF	(United States) USA	Joe Scally	1	0	0+1	0	0+0	0
31	FW	(Czech Republic) CZE	Tomáš Čvančara	0	0	0+0	0	0+0	0
34	MF	(Germany) GER	Mathieu Nguefack	1	0	0+1	0	0+0	0
33	GK	(Germany) GER	Daniel Batz	0	0	0+0	0	0+0	0
36	MF	(Germany) GER	Wael Mohya	2	0	1+0	0	1+0	0
38	MF	(Sweden) SWE	Hugo Bolin	2	0	1+0	0	1+0	0
39	FW	(Guinea-Bissau) GBS	Iaia Manco Danfa	0	0	0+0	0	0+0	0
47	MF	(Japan) JPN	Zento Uno	0	0	0+0	0	0+0	0

=== Goals ===
Rank	Pos.	No.	Player	Bundesliga	DFB-Pokal	Total
1	38	MF	(Sweden) Hugo Bolin	0	2	2
2	14	DF	(Japan) Daiki Hashioka	0	1	1
2	26	DF	(Germany) Lukas Ullrich	0	1	1
2	36	MF	(Germany) Wael Mohya	0	1	1
Total				0	5	5

=== Clean sheets ===
Rank	No.	Player	Bundesliga	DFB-Pokal	Total
1	1	(Germany) Moritz Nicolas	0	1	1
Total			0	1	1

=== Disciplinary record ===
No.	Pos.	Player	Bundesliga			DFB-Pokal			Total		
No.	Pos.	Player	Yellow card	(yellow card) (yellow-red card)	Red card	Yellow card	(yellow card) (yellow-red card)	Red card	Yellow card	(yellow card) (yellow-red card)	Red card
4	DF	(Indonesia) Kevin Diks	0	0	0	1	0	0	1	0	0
Total			0	0	0	1	0	0	1	0	0
