= Fabio Chiarodia =

Italian footballer (born 2005)

Personal information
- Full name: Fabio Cristian Chiarodia
- Date of birth: 5 June 2005 (age 21)
- Place of birth: Oldenburg, Germany
- Height: 1.87 m (6 ft 2 in)
- Position: Centre-back

Team information
- Current team: Borussia Mönchengladbach
- Number: 2

Youth career
- –2014: VfL Oldenburg
- 2014–2021: Werder Bremen

Senior career*
Years	Team	Apps	(Gls)
2021–2023	Werder Bremen	4	(0)
2022–2023	Werder Bremen II	10	(0)
2023–2026	Borussia Mönchengladbach II	18	(0)
2023–	Borussia Mönchengladbach	42	(1)

International career^{‡}
2019	Italy U15	2	(0)
2021–2022	Italy U17	17	(2)
2022–2024	Italy U19	21	(0)
2024–2025	Italy U20	7	(0)
2025–	Italy U21	8	(0)
2026–	Italy	2	(0)
Medal record
Men's football
Representing Italy
UEFA European Under-19 Championship
Winner	2023 Malta
- * Club domestic league appearances and goals as of 17:30, 31 October 2026 (UTC) ‡ National team caps and goals as of 16 November 2026

Fabio Cristian Chiarodia (born 5 June 2005) is a professional footballer who plays as a centre-back or defensive midfielder for Bundesliga club Borussia Mönchengladbach. Born in Germany, he plays for the Italy national team.

== Club career ==
Born in Oldenburg, Germany, to Italian parents from Cinto Caomaggiore, Chiarodia started playing football at local club VfL Oldenburg, before joining Werder Bremen's youth sector in 2014. After coming through the youth ranks of Grün-Weiß, he signed his first professional contract with the club in October 2021, aged 16.

Chiarodia made his professional debut on 10 December 2021, coming on as a late substitute in Werder Bremen's 3–2 away win against Jahn Regensburg in the 2. Bundesliga. At 16 years and 188 days, he was the youngest first-team player in the club's history; he also became the second youngest player to feature in the German second tier, behind only Efe-Kaan Sihlaroglu.

On 19 October 2022, Chiarodia made his first DFB-Pokal appearance against SC Paderborn, becoming the youngest Werder Bremen player to have featured in the competition. He came on as a substitute for Niklas Schmidt in the 73rd minute and played through extra-time, before his side eventually lost the match after penalties. Three days later, he made his Bundesliga debut, being substituted on late in a match against SC Freiburg. He became the youngest Werder Bremen player to appear in the Bundesliga, at the age of 17 years, four months and 17 days. On 17 March 2023, the defender made his first professional start in a 2–2 league draw against Borussia Mönchengladbach: at 17 years, nine months and 12 days, he broke the club's record for the youngest starter in a Bundesliga match, previously held by Nick Woltemade.

On 28 June 2023, it was announced Chiarodia would join fellow Bundesliga side Borussia Mönchengladbach on a four-year deal. He made his debut for the club on 11 August, coming on for Franck Honorat in the 72nd minute of a 7–0 victory over Bersenbrück in the DFB-Pokal first round.

== International career ==
Born in Germany to Italian parents, Chiarodia could choose to represent both countries internationally. After receiving a call-up from the German under-15 national team, he has represented Italy at youth international level since, having featured for the under-15, under-17 and under-19 national teams.

In May 2022, he was included in the Italian squad that took part in the UEFA European Under-17 Championship in Israel, where the Azzurrini reached the quarter-finals before losing to eventual runners-up Netherlands. In December 2022, he was involved in a training camp led by the Italian senior national team's manager, Roberto Mancini, and aimed to the most promising national talents.

In June 2023, he was included in the Italian squad for the UEFA European Under-19 Championship in Malta, where the Azzurrini eventually won their second continental title.

In May 2026 Chiarodia was called up to the Italy national senior squad by interim head coach Silvio Baldini, for friendly matches against Luxembourg and Greece on 3 and 7 June 2026, respectively.

== Style of play ==
Chiarodia is a centre-back, who can also play as a defensive midfielder or a left-back. Comfortable on the ball, he has good physical and technical skills (being able to use both feet), and has his main strengths in his passing, his anticipation and his calm approach.

== Personal life ==
Chiarodia has an older sister and an older brother; the latter has played football in the German lower leagues. His father and his uncle own an ice cream parlour in their local town, Oldenburg.

When he first broke through the first team at Werder Bremen, he was nicknamed Das Küken ("The chick") by the club's captain, Marco Friedl.

== Career statistics ==
=== Club ===
As of match played 31 October 2026

Appearances and goals by club, season and competition
Club	Season	League			National cup		Europe		Other		Total	
Club	Season	Division	Apps	Goals	Apps	Goals	Apps	Goals	Apps	Goals	Apps	Goals
Werder Bremen II	2021–22	Regionalliga Nord	1	0	—		—		—		1	0
Werder Bremen II	2022–23	Regionalliga Nord	9	0	—		—		—		9	0
Werder Bremen II	Total		10	0	—		—		—		10	0
Werder Bremen	2021–22	2. Bundesliga	1	0	0	0	—		—		1	0
Werder Bremen	2022–23	Bundesliga	3	0	1	0	—		—		4	0
Werder Bremen	Total		4	0	1	0	—		—		5	0
Borussia Mönchengladbach II	2023–24	Regionalliga West	12	0	—		—		—		12	0
Borussia Mönchengladbach II	2024–25	Regionalliga West	5	0	—		—		—		5	0
Borussia Mönchengladbach II	2026–27	Regionalliga West	1	0	—		—		—		1	0
Borussia Mönchengladbach II	Total		18	0	—		—		—		18	0
Borussia Mönchengladbach	2023–24	Bundesliga	7	0	3	0	—		—		10	0
Borussia Mönchengladbach	2024–25	Bundesliga	16	1	1	0	—		—		17	1
Borussia Mönchengladbach	2025–26	Bundesliga	15	0	1	0	—		—		16	0
Borussia Mönchengladbach	2026–27	Bundesliga	4	0	1	0	—		—		5	0
Borussia Mönchengladbach	Total		42	1	6	0	—		—		48	1
Career total			73	1	7	0	0	0	0	0	80	1

=== International ===
As of match played 7 June 2026

Appearances and goals by national team and year
National team	Year	Apps	Goals
Italy	2026	2	0
Total		2	0

== Honours ==
Italy U19

- UEFA European Under-19 Championship: 2023
