= Stöger =

Stöger or Stoeger is a surname. Notable people with the surname include:

- Alois Stöger (born 1960), Austrian politician
- Johann August Stöger (1791–1861), Austrian opera singer and theatre manager
- Kevin Stöger (born 1993), Austrian footballer
- Pascal Stöger (born 1990), Austrian footballer
- Peter Stöger (born 1966), Austrian footballer and manager
- William R. Stoeger (1943–2014), American astronomer and theologian
