= Wael Mohya =

German footballer (born 2008)

Personal information
- Date of birth: 31 December 2008 (age 17)
- Place of birth: Mettmann, Germany
- Height: 1.79 m (5 ft 10 in)
- Position: Attacking midfielder

Team information
- Current team: Borussia Mönchengladbach
- Number: 36

Youth career
- –2016: SV Straelen
- 2016–2026: Borussia Mönchengladbach

Senior career*
Years	Team	Apps	(Gls)
2025–	Borussia Mönchengladbach	23	(4)

International career^{‡}
2023	Germany U16	3	(1)
2024	Germany U17	1	(0)
2025–	Germany U18	3	(2)
2026–	Germany U21	2	(0)
- * Club domestic league appearances and goals as of 31 October 2026 ‡ National team caps and goals as of 6 October 2026

Wael Mohya (born 31 December 2008) is a German professional footballer who plays as a attacking midfielder for Bundesliga club Borussia Mönchengladbach.

== Early life ==
Mohya was born on 31 December 2008. Born in Mettmann, Germany, he is of Moroccan descent through his parents.

== Club career ==
As a youth player, Mohya joined the youth academy of SV Straelen.

Following his stint there, he joined the youth academy of Bundesliga side Borussia Mönchengladbach in 2016 and was promoted to the club's senior team in 2025. On 28 October 2025, he debuted with the club during a 3–1 home win over Karlsruher SC in the DFB-Pokal.

== International career ==
Mohya is a Germany youth international. On 17 November 2024, he debuted for the Germany under-17 national team during a 2–2 friendly away draw with the Netherlands.

He was one of the players who were called up with the Germany national team by head coach Jürgen Klopp for the 2026–27 UEFA Nations League matches against Serbia and the Netherlands on 13 and 16 November 2026, respectively.

== Career statistics ==
As of match played 31 October 2026

Appearances and goals by club, season and competition
Club	Season	League			DFB-Pokal		Europe		Total	
Club	Season	Division	Apps	Goals	Apps	Goals	Apps	Goals	Apps	Goals
Borussia Mönchengladbach II	2025–26	Regionalliga West	2	0	—		—		2	0
Borussia Mönchengladbach	2025–26	Bundesliga	15	2	2	0	—		17	2
Borussia Mönchengladbach	2026–27	Bundesliga	8	2	2	1	—		10	3
Borussia Mönchengladbach	Total		23	4	4	1	—		27	5
Career total			25	4	4	1	0	0	29	5
