= Lukas Ullrich =

German footballer (born 2004)

Personal information
- Date of birth: 16 March 2004 (age 22)
- Place of birth: Berlin, Germany
- Height: 1.80 m (5 ft 11 in)
- Position: Left-back

Team information
- Current team: Borussia Mönchengladbach
- Number: 26

Youth career
- Weißenseer
- –2015: Borussia Friedrichsfelde
- 2015–2022: Hertha BSC

Senior career*
Years	Team	Apps	(Gls)
2022–2023	Hertha BSC II	18	(2)
2023	Hertha BSC	0	(0)
2023–	Borussia Mönchengladbach	59	(1)
2023–2025	Borussia Mönchengladbach II	25	(2)

International career^{‡}
2020	Germany U17	1	(0)
2021	Germany U18	7	(2)
2022–2023	Germany U19	11	(4)
2023–2024	Germany U20	6	(0)
2025	Germany U21	13	(0)
Medal record
Men's football
Representing Germany
UEFA European Under-21 Championship
Runner-up	2025 Slovakia
- * Club domestic league appearances and goals as of 31 October 2026 ‡ National team caps and goals as of 6 October 2026

Lukas Ullrich (born 16 March 2004) is a German professional footballer who plays as a left-back for Bundesliga club Borussia Mönchengladbach.

== Club career ==
Born in Berlin, Ullrich started his youth career playing for a few local teams before joining the youth team of Hertha BSC in 2015. Ullrich quickly became the starter left back in Hertha BSC's youth categories before getting promoted to their reserve's team in 2022.

== International career ==
Ullrich has been called up to several categories of Germany national youth teams, including U17, U18 and U19.

== Playing style ==
Ullrich has a good cross technique and goal threat ability. According to Germany national under-19 team manager Guido Streichsbier, "Lukas (Ullrich) can go at a high intensity for 90 minutes and bite down defensively on the opponent".

== Career statistics ==
As of match played 31 October 2026

Appearances and goals by club, season and competition
Club	Season	League			DFB-Pokal		Europe		Other		Total	
Club	Season	Division	Apps	Goals	Apps	Goals	Apps	Goals	Apps	Goals	Apps	Goals
Hertha BSC II	2022–23	Regionalliga Nordost	18	2	—		—		—		18	2
Borussia Mönchengladbach	2023–24	Bundesliga	4	0	0	0	—		—		4	0
Borussia Mönchengladbach	2024–25	Bundesliga	26	1	1	0	—		—		27	1
Borussia Mönchengladbach	2025–26	Bundesliga	22	0	1	0	—		—		23	0
Borussia Mönchengladbach	2026–27	Bundesliga	7	0	2	2	—		—		9	2
Borussia Mönchengladbach	Total		59	1	4	2	—		—		63	3
Borussia Mönchengladbach II	2023–24	Regionalliga West	19	2	—		—		—		19	2
Borussia Mönchengladbach II	2024–25	Regionalliga West	6	0	—		—		—		6	0
Borussia Mönchengladbach II	Total		25	2	—		—		—		25	2
Career total			102	5	4	2	0	0	0	0	106	7

== Honours ==
Germany U21

- UEFA European Under-21 Championship runner-up: 2025
