= Mathieu Nguefack =

German footballer (born 2008)

Personal information
- Date of birth: 14 May 2008 (age 18)
- Place of birth: Mönchengladbach, Germany
- Height: 1.75 m (5 ft 9 in)
- Position: Midfielder

Team information
- Current team: Borussia Mönchengladbach
- Number: 34

Youth career
- –2016: Alemannia Aachen
- 2016–2026: Borussia Mönchengladbach

Senior career*
Years	Team	Apps	(Gls)
2025–2026	Borussia Mönchengladbach II	3	(1)
2026–	Borussia Mönchengladbach	5	(0)

International career^{‡}
2023	Germany U15	2	(0)
2024	Germany U16	5	(0)
2024–2025	Germany U17	10	(0)
2026–	Germany U18	1	(0)
2026–	Germany U19	2	(0)
- * Club domestic league appearances and goals as of 29 October 2026 ‡ National team caps and goals as of 14 November 2026

Mathieu Nguefack (born 14 May 2008) is a German professional footballer who plays as a midfielder for Bundesliga club Borussia Mönchengladbach.

== Club career ==
Born in Mönchengladbach, Nguefack is a youth product of Alemannia Aachen (until 2016) and Borussia Mönchengladbach (2016–2026), where he played in all age categories, most notably winning the U17 Bundesliga as a captain.

He was reported to have signed a 4-years contract with Borussia in May 2025, as he started playing with the reserve team during the following season.

On the summer 2026, he was added to Borussia Mönchengladbach's first team along other academy products like Fritz Fleck or Iaia Manco Danfa.

Nguefack made his professional debut with Borussia Mönchengladbach in a 3–0 Bundesliga away defeat to RB Leipzig on 29 August 2026.

He made his first start during the following league game, a 3–4 home loss to Felix Keidel and Lukas Petkov's SV Elversberg, and despite his club going through a difficult period result-wise, Nguefack managed to become a regular presence with the first team, confirming his status as the club most promising youngster.

== International career ==
Born in Germany, Nguefack also has Cameroonian origins. He is a youth international for Germany, having played for the under-15, under-16, under-17 and under-18.
