= 2025–26 Borussia Mönchengladbach season =

Borussia Mönchengladbach
2025–26 season
- President: Rainer Bonhof
- Head coach: Gerardo Seoane (until 15 September); Eugen Polanski (since 15 September)
- Stadium: Borussia-Park
- Bundesliga: 12th
- DFB-Pokal: Round of 16
- Top goalscorer: League: Haris Tabaković (13); All: Haris Tabaković (15)
- Average home league attendance: 51,138
| Home colours | Away colours | Third colours |

The 2025–26 season was the 126th season in the history of Borussia Mönchengladbach, and the club's seventeenth consecutive season in the Bundesliga. In addition to the domestic league, the club participated in the DFB-Pokal.

== Background and pre-season ==
Manager Gerardo Seoane had been appointed as manager in summer 2023, and after a 14th placed finish in his debut season as manager, the club challenged for European qualification in the 2024–25 season, but ultimately finished 10th.

== Review ==
=== August to December ===
Borussia Mönchengladbach opening game of the season was on 17 August, beating Atlas Delmenhorst 5–0 in the opening round of the DFB-Pokal. They began their Bundesliga campaign with a goalless draw at home to newly promoted Hamburger SV on 24 August, before consecutive defeats without scoring away to VfB Stuttgart (0–1) on 30 August and at home to Werder Bremen (0–4) on 14 September. On 15 September, Gerardo Seoane was sacked as head coach, with managing director Roland Virkus claiming that "after 10 Bundesliga matches without a win, stretching across two seasons, we've lost the belief that a turnaround is possible with Gerardo". Eugen Polanski was appointed as his successor on a temporary basis. In Polanski's first match as manager, the club picked up a 1–1 draw away to Bayer Leverkusen after Haris Tabaković scored Gladbach's first Bundesliga goal of the season – a 93rd minute penalty. Gladbach went 6–0 behind at home to Eintracht Frankfurt on 27 September by the 47th minute before late goals from Jens Castrop, Tabaković, Yannik Engelhardt and Grant-Leon Ranos left the final score at a 6–4 defeat, and left the club bottom of the Bundesliga table. Sporting director Roland Virkus also resigned from his role on 30 September, and was replaced by Rouven Schröder, the former Red Bull Salzburg sporting director, on 14 October. This had followed a goalless home draw with SC Freiburg on 5 October, and Gladbach lost their following two matches 3–1 away to Union Berlin (with Tabaković scoring their goal) and 3–0 at home to Bayern Munich. The club ended October with a 3–2 DFB-Pokal win over Karlsruher SC on 28 October.

Polanski picked up his first Bundesliga win with Borussia Mönchengladbach in his sixth match as manager with a 4–0 win over FC St. Pauli, on 1 November. On 18 November, Polanski was appointed on a permanent basis on a deal until June 2028.

== Competitions ==
=== Bundesliga ===
==== League table ====
| Pos | Team | Pld | W | D | L | GF | GA | GD | Pts |
|---|---|---|---|---|---|---|---|---|---|
| 10 | Mainz 05 | 34 | 10 | 10 | 14 | 44 | 53 | −9 | 40 |
| 11 | Union Berlin | 34 | 10 | 9 | 15 | 44 | 58 | −14 | 39 |
| 12 | Borussia Mönchengladbach | 34 | 9 | 11 | 14 | 42 | 53 | −11 | 38 |
| 13 | Hamburger SV | 34 | 9 | 11 | 14 | 40 | 54 | −14 | 38 |
| 14 | 1. FC Köln | 34 | 7 | 11 | 16 | 49 | 63 | −14 | 32 |

Source: Bundesliga
Rules for classification: 1) Points; 2) Goal difference; 3) Goals scored; 4) Head-to-head results; 5) Head-to-head away goals scored; 6) Away goals scored; 7) Play-off.
(Rules 4–6 only apply after home and away matches have been played between the tied teams.)

==== Match details ====
Bundesliga match details
| Round | Date | Time | Opponent | Venue | Result F–A | Scorers | Attendance | League position | Ref. |
|---|---|---|---|---|---|---|---|---|---|
| 1 | 24 August 2025 | 17:30 | Hamburger SV | Home | 0–0 | | 54,042 | 10th | |
| 2 | 30 August 2025 | 15:30 | VfB Stuttgart | Away | 0–1 | | 60,000 | 14th | |
| 3 | 14 September 2025 | 17:30 | Werder Bremen | Home | 0–4 | | 52,000 | 16th | |
| 4 | 21 September 2025 | 17:30 | Bayer Leverkusen | Away | 1–1 | Tabaković 90+3' | 30,210 | 17th | |
| 5 | 27 September 2025 | 18:30 | Eintracht Frankfurt | Home | 4–6 | Castrop 72', Tabaković 78', Engelhardt 83', Ranos 90+9' | 54,042 | 18th | |
| 6 | 5 October 2025 | 19:30 | SC Freiburg | Home | 0–0 | | 44,709 | 17th | |
| 7 | 17 October 2025 | 20:30 | Union Berlin | Away | 1–3 | Tabaković 33' | 22,012 | 18th | |
| 8 | 25 October 2025 | 15:45 | Bayern Munich | Home | 0–3 | | 54,042 | 18th | |
| 9 | 1 November 2025 | 15:30 | FC St. Pauli | Away | 4–0 | Tabaković 15', 40', Machino 75', Fraulo 80' | 29,546 | 16th | |
| 10 | 8 November 2025 | 18:30 | 1. FC Köln | Home | 3–1 | Sander 45+2', Diks 61' pen., Tabaković 64' | 54,042 | 12th | |
| 11 | 22 November 2025 | 15:30 | 1. FC Heidenheim | Away | 3–0 | Diks 45+1' pen., Tabaković 55', Machino 76' | 15,000 | 12th | |
| 12 | 28 November 2025 | 20:30 | RB Leipzig | Home | 0–0 | | 50,029 | 12th | |
| 13 | 5 December 2025 | 20:30 | Mainz 05 | Away | 1–0 | Da Costa 58' o.g. | 30,500 | 10th | |
| 14 | 13 December 2025 | 15:30 | VfL Wolfsburg | Home | 1–3 | Koulierakis 22' o.g. | 47,161 | 11th | |
| 15 | 19 December 2025 | 20:30 | Borussia Dortmund | Away | 0–2 | | 81,365 | 12th | |
| 16 | 11 January 2026 | 15:30 | FC Augsburg | Home | 4–0 | Scally 8', Diks 20' pen., Tabaković 36', 61' | 51,000 | 10th | |
| 17 | 14 January 2026 | 20:30 | TSG Hoffenheim | Away | 1–5 | Machino 69' | 20,750 | 10th | |
| 18 | 17 January 2026 | 15:30 | Hamburger SV | Away | 0–0 | | 57,000 | 11th | |
| 19 | 25 January 2026 | 15:30 | VfB Stuttgart | Home | 0–3 | | 48,844 | 11th | |
| 20 | 31 January 2026 | 15:30 | Werder Bremen | Away | 1–1 | Tabaković 62' | 41,800 | 12th | |
| 21 | 7 February 2026 | 18:30 | Bayer Leverkusen | Home | 1–1 | Engelhardt 10' | 47,599 | 12th | |
| 22 | 14 February 2026 | 15:30 | Eintracht Frankfurt | Away | 0–3 | | 59,500 | 13th | |
| 23 | 22 February 2026 | 15:30 | SC Freiburg | Away | 1–2 | Tabaković 85' | 34,700 | 14th | |
| 24 | 28 February 2026 | 15:30 | Union Berlin | Home | 1–0 | Diks 90+4' pen. | 52,488 | 12th | |
| 25 | 6 March 2026 | 20:30 | Bayern Munich | Away | 1–4 | Mohya 89' | 75,000 | 12th | |
| 26 | 13 March 2026 | 20:30 | FC St. Pauli | Home | 2–0 | Stöger 37', Honorat 62' | 49,202 | 12th | |
| 27 | 21 March 2026 | 15:30 | 1. FC Köln | Away | 3–3 | Castrop 1', 60', Sander 21' | 50,000 | 13th | |
| 28 | 4 April 2026 | 15:30 | 1. FC Heidenheim | Home | 2–2 | Mohya 16', Honorat 74' | 52,129 | 13th | |
| 29 | 11 April 2026 | 15:30 | RB Leipzig | Away | 0–1 | | 47,800 | 14th | |
| 30 | 19 April 2026 | 19:30 | Mainz 05 | Home | 1–1 | Scally 7' | 50,245 | 13th | |
| 31 | 25 April 2026 | 15:30 | VfL Wolfsburg | Away | 0–0 | | 27,947 | 11th | |
| 32 | 3 May 2026 | 17:40 | Borussia Dortmund | Home | 1–0 | Tabaković 88' | 54,042 | 11th | |
| 33 | 9 May 2026 | 15:30 | FC Augsburg | Away | 1–3 | Reyna 90+2' | 30,660 | 13th | |
| 34 | 16 May 2026 | 15:30 | TSG Hoffenheim | Home | 4–0 | Bolin 14', Tabaković 23', Diks 81', Hack 90+1' | 53,033 | 12th | |

=== DFB-Pokal ===
DFB-Pokal match details
| Round | Date | Time | Opponent | Venue | Result F–A | Scorers | Attendance | Ref. |
|---|---|---|---|---|---|---|---|---|
| First round | 17 August 2025 | 15:30 | Atlas Delmenhorst | Away | 3–2 | Hack 20', 38', Elvedi 68' | 14,300 | |
| Second round | 28 October 2025 | 20:45 | Karlsruher SC | Home | 3–2 | Machino 3', Elvedi 51', Tabaković 89' | 48,023 | |
| Round of 16 | 2 December 2025 | 18:00 | FC St. Pauli | Home | 1–2 | Tabaković 56' | 48,104 | |

== Players ==
=== Appearances and goals ===
Numbers in parentheses denote appearances made as a substitute.
Players with names struck through and marked † left the club during the playing season.
Players with names in italics and marked * were on loan from another club for the whole of their season with Borussia.
Key to positions: GK – Goalkeeper; DF – Defender; MF – Midfielder; FW – Forward

Players' appearances and goals by competition
| No. | Pos. | Nat. | Name | Bundesliga | | DFB-Pokal | | Total | |
| No. | Pos. | Nat. | Name | Apps | Goals | Apps | Goals | Apps | Goals |
|---|---|---|---|---|---|---|---|---|---|
| 1 | GK | SUI | ~~Jonas Omlin~~ † | 0 | 0 | 0 | 0 | 0 | 0 |
| 2 | DF | ITA | Fabio Chiarodia | 8 (7) | 0 | 0 (1) | 0 | 8 (8) | 0 |
| 4 | DF | IDN | Kevin Diks | 28 (2) | 5 | 3 | 0 | 31 (2) | 5 |
| 5 | DF | GER | Marvin Friedrich | 1 (5) | 0 | 0 (1) | 0 | 1 (6) | 0 |
| 6 | MF | GER | Yannik Engelhardt * | 29 (2) | 2 | 2 | 0 | 31 (2) | 2 |
| 7 | MF | AUT | Kevin Stöger | 15 (14) | 1 | 3 | 0 | 18 (14) | 1 |
| 8 | MF | GER | ~~Julian Weigl~~ † | 0 | 0 | 0 | 0 | 0 | 0 |
| 8 | FW | ARG | Alejo Sarco * | 0 (3) | 0 | 0 | 0 | 0 (3) | 0 |
| 9 | MF | FRA | Franck Honorat | 24 (4) | 2 | 3 | 0 | 27 (4) | 2 |
| 10 | MF | GER | Florian Neuhaus | 11 (6) | 0 | 0 (1) | 0 | 11 (7) | 0 |
| 11 | FW | GER | Tim Kleindienst | 0 (3) | 0 | 0 (1) | 0 | 0 (4) | 0 |
| 13 | MF | USA | Giovanni Reyna | 4 (15) | 1 | 1 | 0 | 5 (15) | 1 |
| 14 | DF | JPN | Kōta Takai * | 3 (5) | 0 | 0 | 0 | 3 (5) | 0 |
| 15 | FW | BIH | Haris Tabaković * | 28 (4) | 13 | 3 | 2 | 31 (4) | 15 |
| 16 | MF | GER | Philipp Sander | 29 (1) | 2 | 2 | 0 | 31 (1) | 2 |
| 17 | MF | KOR | Jens Castrop | 20 (6) | 3 | 0 (2) | 0 | 20 (8) | 3 |
| 18 | FW | JPN | Shuto Machino | 9 (23) | 3 | 2 | 1 | 11 (23) | 4 |
| 19 | MF | FRA | Nathan Ngoumou | 0 | 0 | 0 | 0 | 0 | 0 |
| 20 | DF | GER | ~~Luca Netz~~ † | 10 (5) | 0 | 1 (1) | 0 | 11 (6) | 0 |
| 21 | GK | GER | Tobias Sippel | 0 | 0 | 0 | 0 | 0 | 0 |
| 22 | MF | DEN | ~~Oscar Fraulo~~ † | 0 (4) | 1 | 0 (1) | 0 | 0 (5) | 1 |
| 23 | GK | GER | Jan Olschowsky | 0 | 0 | 0 | 0 | 0 | 0 |
| 24 | MF | GER | Fritz Fleck | 0 | 0 | 0 | 0 | 0 | 0 |
| 25 | MF | GER | Robin Hack | 3 (5) | 1 | 1 | 2 | 4 (5) | 3 |
| 26 | DF | GER | Lukas Ullrich | 0 | 0 | 2 | 0 | 2 | 0 |
| 27 | MF | GER | Rocco Reitz | 31 | 0 | 2 (1) | 0 | 33 (1) | 0 |
| 28 | FW | ARM | ~~Grant-Leon Ranos~~ † | 0 (8) | 1 | 0 (2) | 0 | 0 (10) | 1 |
| 29 | DF | USA | Joe Scally | 29 (3) | 2 | 2 (1) | 0 | 31 (4) | 2 |
| 30 | DF | SUI | Nico Elvedi | 33 | 0 | 3 | 2 | 36 | 2 |
| 33 | GK | GER | Moritz Nicolas | 34 | 0 | 3 | 0 | 37 | 0 |
| 34 | MF | GER | ~~Charles Herrmann~~ † | 0 (1) | 0 | 0 (1) | 0 | 0 (2) | 0 |
| 36 | MF | GER | Wael Mohya | 6 (9) | 2 | 0 (2) | 0 | 6 (11) | 2 |
| 38 | MF | SWE | Hugo Bolin * | 5 (8) | 1 | 0 | 0 | 5 (8) | 1 |
| 39 | MF | GER | Niklas Swider | 0 | 0 | 0 | 0 | 0 | 0 |
| 40 | FW | GER | Jan Urbich | 0 (3) | 0 | 0 | 0 | 0 (3) | 0 |
| 42 | GK | LUX | Tiago Pereira Cardoso | 0 | 0 | 0 | 0 | 0 | 0 |

=== Transfers ===
==== In ====
| Pos. | Player | Transferred from | Fee | Date | Source |
|---|---|---|---|---|---|
| MF | Jens Castrop (KOR) | 1. FC Nürnberg (GER) | €4,500,000 | 1 July 2025 | |
| DF | Kevin Diks (IDN) | F.C. Copenhagen (DEN) | Free | 1 July 2025 | |
| FW | Haris Tabaković (BIH) | TSG Hoffenheim (GER) | Loan | 19 July 2025 | |
| FW | Shūto Machino (JPN) | Holstein Kiel (GER) | €8,000,000 | 26 July 2025 | |
| MF | Giovanni Reyna (USA) | Borussia Dortmund (GER) | €4,000,000 | 23 August 2025 | |
| MF | Yannik Engelhardt (GER) | Como (ITA) | Loan | 1 September 2025 | |
| DF | Kōta Takai (JPN) | Tottenham Hotspur (ENG) | Loan | 2 January 2026 | |
| FW | Alejo Sarco (ARG) | Bayer Leverkusen (GER) | Loan | 20 January 2026 | |
| MF | Hugo Bolin (SWE) | Malmö FF (SWE) | Loan | 2 February 2026 | |

==== Out ====
| Pos. | Player | Transferred to | Fee | Date | Source |
|---|---|---|---|---|---|
| DF | Stefan Lainer (AUT) | Red Bull Salzburg (AUT) | Free | 1 July 2025 | |
| GK | Jan Olschowsky (GER) | Alemannia Aachen (GER) | Loan | 1 July 2025 | |
| FW | Alassane Pléa (FRA) | PSV (NED) | €4,500,000 | 17 July 2025 | |
| FW | Tomáš Čvančara (CZE) | Alanyaspor (TUR) | Loan | 26 July 2025 | |
| FW | Noah Pesch (CRO) | 1. FC Magdeburg (GER) | Loan | 29 July 2025 | |
| DF | Ko Itakura (JPN) | Ajax (NED) | €10,500,000 | 7 August 2025 | |
| MF | Yvandro Borges Sanches (LUX) | Heracles Almelo (NED) | €500,000 | 7 August 2025 | |
| FW | Shiō Fukuda (JPN) | Karlsruher SC (GER) | Loan | 22 August 2025 | |
| MF | Julian Weigl (GER) | Al-Qadsiah (KSA) | €7,000,000 | 1 September 2025 | |
| MF | Oscar Fraulo (DEN) | Derby County (ENG) | €400,000 | 2 January 2026 | |
| FW | Tomáš Čvančara (CZE) | Celtic (SCO) | Loan | 22 January 2026 | |
| GK | Jonas Omlin (SUI) | Bayer Leverkusen (GER) | Loan | 27 January 2026 | |
| FW | Charles Herrmann (GER) | Cercle Brugge (BEL) | €800,000 | 1 February 2026 | |
| DF | Luca Netz (GER) | Nottingham Forest (ENG) | €2,500,000 | 2 February 2026 | |
| FW | Grant-Leon Ranos (ARM) | Eintracht Braunschweig (GER) | Loan | 2 February 2026 | |
| FW | Kilian Sauck (GER) | Fortuna Düsseldorf (GER) | Loan | 2 February 2026 | |
| FW | Armando Güner (ARG) | Galatasaray (TUR) | €350,000 | 5 February 2026 | |
