= Fritz Fleck =

German footballer (born 2007)

Personal information
- Full name: Fritz Henri Fleck
- Date of birth: 30 May 2007 (age 19)
- Place of birth: Bielefeld, Germany
- Height: 1.72 m (5 ft 8 in)
- Positions: Winger; attacking midfielder

Team information
- Current team: Borussia Mönchengladbach
- Number: 27

Youth career
- Arminia Bielefeld
- 2020–2024: Borussia Dortmund
- 2024–2026: Borussia Mönchengladbach

Senior career*
Years	Team	Apps	(Gls)
2024–	Borussia Mönchengladbach II	25	(6)
2026–	Borussia Mönchengladbach	1	(0)

International career^{‡}
2024–2025	Germany U18	6	(0)
- * Club domestic league appearances and goals as of 29 October 2026 ‡ National team caps and goals as of 29 October 2026

Fritz Fleck (born 30 May 2007) is a German professional footballer who plays as a winger for Bundesliga club Borussia Mönchengladbach.

== Club career ==
Born in Bielefeld, Fleck is a youth product of Arminia Bielefeld and Borussia Dortmund's academy. With the latter he won the 2024 U17 Bundesliga.

In July 2024, he signed for Borussia Mönchengladbach in Bundesliga. He started playing with the reserve team during the 2024–25 season, before signing his first professionnel contract the following summer.

On the summer 2026, he was added to Borussia Mönchengladbach's first team roster along other academy products like Mathieu Nguefack or Iaia Manco Danfa.

After impressing during October friendlies, Fleck made his professional debut with Borussia Mönchengladbach coming on in a 2–1 Bundesliga away loss to 1. FC Köln on 11 October 2026. Soon after this promising debut, the youngster suffered a severe strain, slowing his first team progressing.

== International career ==
Fleck is a youth international for Germany, having played for the under-18.
