= Joe Scally =

American soccer player (born 2002)

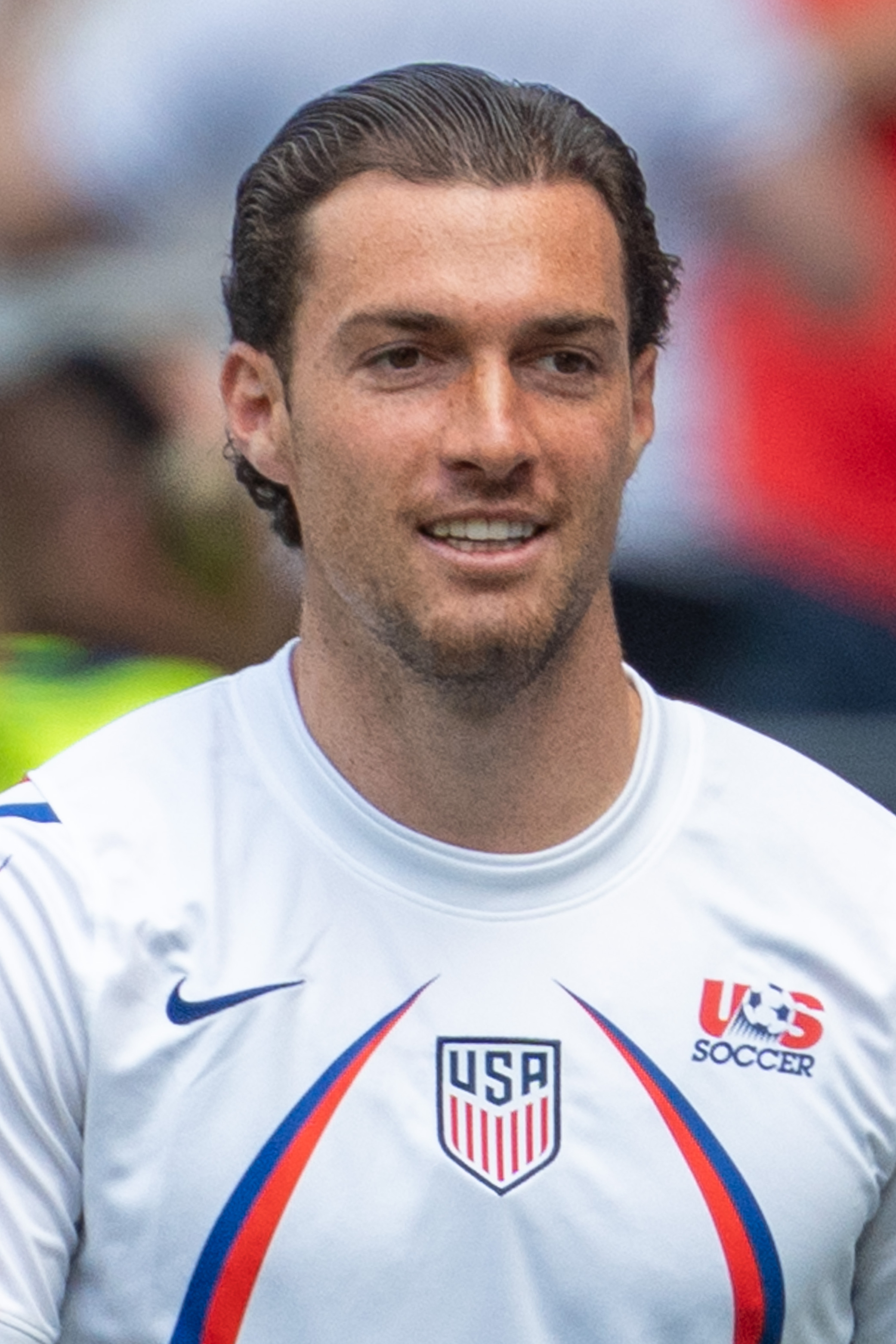
- Scally with the United States in 2026

Personal information
- Full name: Joseph Michael Scally
- Date of birth: December 31, 2002 (age 23)
- Place of birth: Lake Grove, New York, US
- Height: 6 ft 0 in (1.84 m)
- Position: Full-back

Team information
- Current team: Borussia Mönchengladbach
- Number: 29

Youth career
- 2015–2018: New York City FC

Senior career*
| Years | Team | Apps | (Gls) |
| 2018–2020 | New York City FC | 4 | (0) |
| 2021 | Borussia Mönchengladbach II | 15 | (1) |
| 2021– | Borussia Mönchengladbach | 161 | (7) |

International career^{‡}
| 2017 | United States U15 | 5 | (1) |
| 2017–2019 | United States U17 | 19 | (1) |
| 2022– | United States | 28 | (0) |
Medal record
Men's soccer
Representing United States
CONCACAF Nations League
| Winner | 2023 |
| Winner | 2024 |
- * Club domestic league appearances and goals as of October 31, 2026 ‡ National team caps and goals as of June 25, 2026

Joseph Michael Scally (born December 31, 2002) is an American professional soccer player who plays as a full-back for Bundesliga club Borussia Mönchengladbach and the United States national team.

== Early life ==
Scally is from Long Island, New York. On the day he was born, his father worked at Napper Tandy's Irish Pub and called out the day Scally was born.

== Club career ==
=== New York City ===
Scally signed his first professional contract with New York City on March 21, 2018, at the age of 15, and in doing so became the second youngest professional soccer player in the United States, after Freddy Adu. He made his professional debut for New York City in a 4–0 U.S. Open Cup loss to New York Red Bulls on June 6, coming on as a late substitute.

=== Borussia Mönchengladbach ===
On November 13, 2019, it was announced that Scally would join Bundesliga side Borussia Mönchengladbach at the end of the 2020 MLS season. On October 2, 2021, he scored his first Bundesliga goal against VfL Wolfsburg in a 3–1 victory.

== International career ==
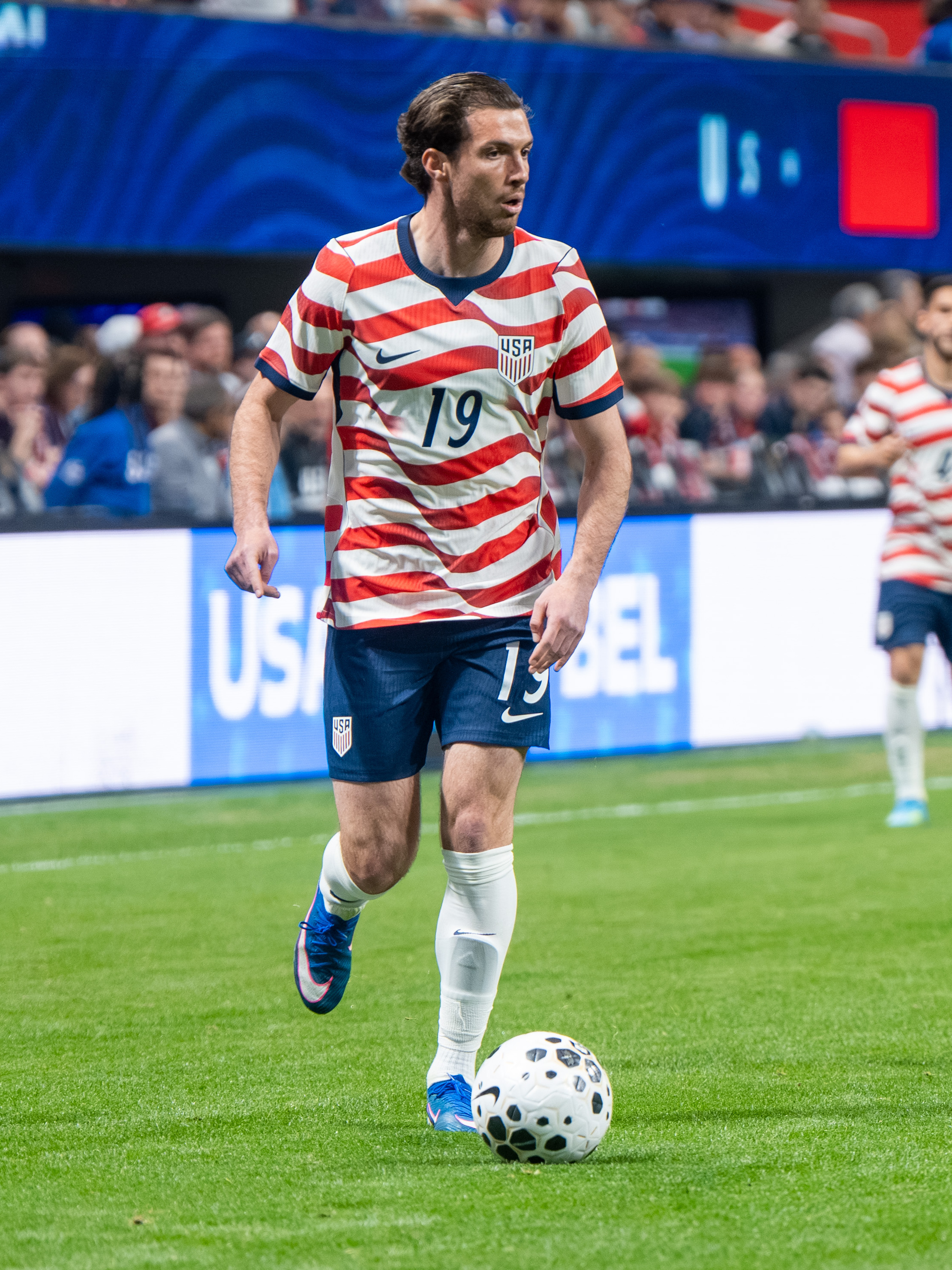
Scally playing for the United States in 2026

Scally was a youth international for the United States, representing the United States under-15s and the United States under-17s despite being three years younger than his teammates.

In October 2019, he was named to the squad for the 2019 FIFA U-17 World Cup in Brazil.

In November 2021, he was named to the squad for the senior United States team ahead of their home 2022 FIFA World Cup qualifiers against Mexico and Jamaica. On June 1, 2022, he made his senior debut for the United States in a 3–0 win in a friendly match against Morocco. In November 2022, Scally was named to the 2022 FIFA World Cup squad, but did not make an appearance in the tournament.

On May 26, 2026, Scally was selected in the 26-man squad for the 2026 FIFA World Cup.

== Personal life ==
Scally is close friends with USMNT teammate Gio Reyna, both players began attending the New York City FC youth academy in 2015.

== Career statistics ==
=== Club ===
As of match played October 31, 2026

Appearances and goals by club, season and competition
| Club | Season | League | | | National cup (Note: Includes U.S. Open Cup, DFB-Pokal) | | Continental | | Other | | Total | |
| Club | Season | Division | Apps | Goals | Apps | Goals | Apps | Goals | Apps | Goals | Apps | Goals |
|---|---|---|---|---|---|---|---|---|---|---|---|---|
| New York City FC | 2018 | MLS | 0 | 0 | 1 | 0 | — | | — | | 1 | 0 |
| New York City FC | 2019 | MLS | 0 | 0 | — | | — | | — | | 0 | 0 |
| New York City FC | 2020 | MLS | 4 | 0 | — | | 1 (Note: Appearance in CONCACAF Champions League) | 0 | 1 (Note: Appearance in MLS Cup Playoffs) | 0 | 6 | 0 |
| New York City FC | Total | | 4 | 0 | 1 | 0 | 1 | 0 | 1 | 0 | 7 | 0 |
| Borussia Mönchengladbach II | 2020–21 | Regionalliga West | 15 | 1 | — | | — | | — | | 15 | 1 |
| Borussia Mönchengladbach | 2021–22 | Bundesliga | 30 | 1 | 3 | 0 | — | | — | | 33 | 1 |
| Borussia Mönchengladbach | 2022–23 | Bundesliga | 28 | 0 | 2 | 1 | — | | — | | 30 | 1 |
| Borussia Mönchengladbach | 2023–24 | Bundesliga | 31 | 1 | 4 | 0 | — | | — | | 35 | 1 |
| Borussia Mönchengladbach | 2024–25 | Bundesliga | 32 | 0 | 2 | 0 | — | | — | | 34 | 0 |
| Borussia Mönchengladbach | 2025–26 | Bundesliga | 32 | 2 | 2 | 0 | — | | — | | 34 | 2 |
| Borussia Mönchengladbach | 2026–27 | Bundesliga | 8 | 3 | 1 | 0 | — | | — | | 9 | 3 |
| Borussia Mönchengladbach | Total | | 161 | 7 | 14 | 1 | — | | — | | 175 | 8 |
| Career total | | | 180 | 8 | 15 | 1 | 1 | 0 | 1 | 0 | 197 | 9 |

=== International ===
As of match played June 25, 2026

Appearances and goals by national team and year
| National team | Year | Apps | Goals |
|---|---|---|---|
| United States | 2022 | 3 | 0 |
| United States | 2023 | 5 | 0 |
| United States | 2024 | 11 | 0 |
| United States | 2025 | 3 | 0 |
| United States | 2026 | 6 | 0 |
| Total | | 28 | 0 |

== Honors ==
United States

- CONCACAF Nations League: 2022–23, 2023–24
