= Philipp Sander =

German footballer (born 1998)

Personal information
- Date of birth: 21 February 1998 (age 28)
- Place of birth: Rostock, Germany
- Height: 1.85 m (6 ft 1 in)
- Position: Midfielder

Team information
- Current team: Borussia Mönchengladbach
- Number: 16

Youth career
- Hafen Rostock
- –2015: Hansa Rostock
- 2015–2017: Holstein Kiel

Senior career*
Years	Team	Apps	(Gls)
2017–2022	Holstein Kiel II	51	(10)
2018–2024	Holstein Kiel	81	(4)
2020–2021	→ SC Verl (loan)	35	(2)
2024–	Borussia Mönchengladbach	65	(3)
- * Club domestic league appearances and goals as of 31 October 2026

Philipp Sander (born 21 February 1998) is a German professional footballer who plays as a midfielder for Bundesliga club Borussia Mönchengladbach.

== Career ==
Sander made his professional debut for Holstein Kiel in the 2. Bundesliga on 23 December 2018, coming on as a substitute in the 90+2nd minute for Kingsley Schindler in the 3–1 home win against Hamburger SV.

He joined 3. Liga side SC Verl on loan for the 2020–21 season. In the summer of 2023, he extended his contract in Kiel until 2027.

On 20 May 2024, Sander signed a four-year contract with Borussia Mönchengladbach.

== Career statistics ==
As of match played 31 October 2026

Appearances and goals by club, season and competition
Club	Season	League			DFB-Pokal		Europe		Other		Total	
Club	Season	Division	Apps	Goals	Apps	Goals	Apps	Goals	Apps	Goals	Apps	Goals
Holstein Kiel II	2016–17	Oberliga	1	0	—		—		—		1	0
Holstein Kiel II	2017–18	Oberliga	21	3	—		—		2 (Note: Appearance(s) in promotion playoffs)	3	23	6
Holstein Kiel II	2018–19	Regionalliga Nord	20	2	—		—		—		20	2
Holstein Kiel II	2019–20	Regionalliga Nord	6	1	—		—		—		6	1
Holstein Kiel II	2021–22	Regionalliga Nord	1	1	—		—		—		1	1
Holstein Kiel II	2023–24	Regionalliga Nord	1	1	—		—		—		1	1
Holstein Kiel II	Total		50	8	—		—		2	3	52	11
Holstein Kiel	2018–19	2. Bundesliga	1	0	0	0	—		—		1	0
Holstein Kiel	2019–20	2. Bundesliga	4	0	2	0	—		—		6	0
Holstein Kiel	2021–22	2. Bundesliga	19	0	2	1	—		—		21	1
Holstein Kiel	2022–23	2. Bundesliga	32	1	1	0	—		—		33	1
Holstein Kiel	2023–24	2. Bundesliga	25	3	1	0	—		—		26	3
Holstein Kiel	Total		81	4	6	1	—		—		87	5
SC Verl (loan)	2020–21	3. Liga	35	2	1	0	—		—		36	2
Borussia Mönchengladbach	2024–25	Bundesliga	27	1	2	0	—		—		29	1
Borussia Mönchengladbach	2025–26	Bundesliga	30	2	2	0	—		—		32	2
Borussia Mönchengladbach	2026–27	Bundesliga	8	0	2	0	—		—		10	0
Borussia Mönchengladbach	Total		65	3	6	0	—		—		71	3
Career total			231	17	13	1	0	0	2	3	246	21
