= Sulo Ketola =

Finnish footballer (born 2007)

Personal information
- Date of birth: 14 February 2007 (age 19)
- Place of birth: Rauma, Finland
- Height: 1.95 m (6 ft 5 in)
- Position: Centre-forward

Team information
- Current team: Borussia Mönchengladbach II
- Number: 18

Youth career
- –2020: FC Rauma
- 2020–2023: Pallo-Iirot
- 2023–: Borussia Mönchengladbach

Senior career*
Years	Team	Apps	(Gls)
2021–2023	Pallo-Iirot	20	(4)
2026–	Borussia Mönchengladbach II	1	(0)

International career^{‡}
2021–2022	Finland U15	5	(1)
2022–2023	Finland U16	7	(4)
2024	Finland U18	2	(0)
2025–	Finland U19	1	(0)
- * Club domestic league appearances and goals as of 2 October 2026 ‡ National team caps and goals as of 18 November 2025

Sulo Ketola (born 14 February 2007) is a Finnish professional footballer who plays as a forward for Regionalliga West club Borussia Mönchengladbach II.

== Career ==
Born in Rauma, Ketola played in the youth sectors of local clubs FC Rauma and Pallo-Iirot. He debuted in senior level in 2021 with Pallo-Iirot first team, in the fourth-tier Kolmonen. He represented the club in Kolmonen in 2021–2022, and in third-tier Kakkonen in 2023.

After having trialed with several notable European clubs, it was announced in the late June 2023 that Ketola would join Bundesliga club Borussia Mönchengladbach organisation. He signed a three-year deal with the club, for an undisclosed fee, and was initially assigned to the U17s at the youth academy.

== Personal life ==
His father Kari Ketola is a former footballer, who played for Porin Pallo-Toverit (PPT, currently FC Jazz) in top division Mestaruussarja in 1987, and for several different clubs in Rauma area.

== Career statistics ==
As of 27 January 2024

Appearances and goals by club, season and competition
Club	Season	League			National cup (Note: Includes Suomen Cup)		Other		Continental		Total	
Club	Season	Division	Apps	Goals	Apps	Goals	Apps	Goals	Apps	Goals	Apps	Goals
Pallo-Iirot	2021	Kolmonen	7	1	0	0	—		—		7	1
Pallo-Iirot	2022	Kolmonen	7	1	4	6	—		—		11	7
Pallo-Iirot	2023	Kakkonen	6	2	2	2	—		—		8	4
Career total			20	4	6	8	0	0	0	0	26	12
