= Robin Hack =

German footballer (born 1998)

Personal information
- Date of birth: 27 August 1998 (age 28)
- Place of birth: Pforzheim, Germany
- Height: 1.78 m (5 ft 10 in)
- Position: Forward

Team information
- Current team: Borussia Mönchengladbach
- Number: 25

Youth career
- 1. FC Calmbach
- –2012: Karlsruher SC
- 2012–2017: 1899 Hoffenheim

Senior career*
Years	Team	Apps	(Gls)
2017–2019	1899 Hoffenheim II	26	(4)
2017–2019	1899 Hoffenheim	3	(1)
2019–2021	1. FC Nürnberg	55	(14)
2021–2023	Arminia Bielefeld	63	(10)
2023–	Borussia Mönchengladbach	78	(15)

International career^{‡}
2014	Germany U16	6	(0)
2014	Germany U17	3	(0)
2016–2017	Germany U19	9	(1)
2017–2018	Germany U20	7	(5)
2019–2020	Germany U21	5	(3)
- * Club domestic league appearances and goals as of 31 October 2026 ‡ National team caps and goals as of 18:11, 3 September 2020 (UTC)

Robin Hack (German pronunciation: [ˈʁɔbɪn ˈhak]; born 27 August 1998) is a German professional footballer who plays as a forward for Bundesliga club Borussia Mönchengladbach.

== Club career ==
In June 2019, Hack signed for 1. FC Nürnberg from 1899 Hoffenheim.

After two seasons with Nürnberg, Hack transferred to Arminia Bielefeld in August 2021, signing until 2025.

On 26 June 2023, Hack signed for Bundesliga club Borussia Mönchengladbach on a four-year deal. On 20 April 2024, he scored his first Bundesliga hat-trick in a 4–3 away defeat against his former club Hoffenheim.

== International career ==
Hack was a youth international footballer for Germany. On 10 September 2019, he scored his first career hat-trick for Germany U21 in a 5–1 away win over Wales U21 during the 2021 UEFA European Under-21 Championship qualification.

== Career statistics ==
As of match played 31 October 2026

Appearances and goals by club, season and competition
Club	Season	League			DFB-Pokal		Europe		Other		Total	
Club	Season	Division	Apps	Goals	Apps	Goals	Apps	Goals	Apps	Goals	Apps	Goals
1899 Hoffenheim II	2017–18	Regionalliga Südwest	17	3	—		—		—		17	3
1899 Hoffenheim II	2018–19	Regionalliga Südwest	9	1	—		—		—		9	1
1899 Hoffenheim II	Total		26	4	—		—		—		26	4
1899 Hoffenheim	2017–18	Bundesliga	3	1	1	0	1 (Note: Appearances in UEFA Europa League)	0	—		5	1
1899 Hoffenheim	2018–19	Bundesliga	0	0	0	0	1 (Note: Appearances in UEFA Champions League)	0	—		1	0
1899 Hoffenheim	Total		3	1	1	0	2	0	0	0	6	1
Nürnberg	2019–20	2. Bundesliga	31	10	1	0	—		2 (Note: Appearances in relegation playoffs)	0	34	10
Nürnberg	2020–21	2. Bundesliga	23	4	1	0	—		—		24	4
Nürnberg	2021–22	2. Bundesliga	1	0	—		—		—		1	0
Nürnberg	Total		55	14	2	0	—		2	0	59	14
Arminia Bielefeld	2021–22	Bundesliga	30	0	1	0	—		—		31	0
Arminia Bielefeld	2022–23	2. Bundesliga	33	10	2	1	—		2	0	37	11
Arminia Bielefeld	Total		63	10	3	1	—		2	0	68	11
Borussia Mönchengladbach	2023–24	Bundesliga	29	10	4	3	—		—		33	13
Borussia Mönchengladbach	2024–25	Bundesliga	33	4	1	0	—		—		34	4
Borussia Mönchengladbach	2025–26	Bundesliga	8	1	1	2	—		—		9	3
Borussia Mönchengladbach	2026–27	Bundesliga	8	0	2	1	—		—		10	1
Borussia Mönchengladbach	Total		78	15	8	6	—		—		86	21
Career total			225	44	18	7	2	0	4	0	245	51

== Honors ==
Germany U20

- Under 20 Elite League: 2017–18

Individual

- Under 20 Elite League top scorer: 2017–18
