= Jan Leszczyński (footballer, born 2007) =

Polish footballer (born 2007)

Personal information
- Date of birth: 12 April 2007 (age 19)
- Place of birth: Warsaw, Poland
- Height: 1.91 m (6 ft 3 in)
- Position: Centre-back

Team information
- Current team: Borussia Mönchengladbach
- Number: 5

Youth career
- Ursus Warsaw
- Legia Warsaw

Senior career*
Years	Team	Apps	(Gls)
2024–2026	Legia Warsaw II	22	(2)
2026	Legia Warsaw	4	(0)
2026–	Borussia Mönchengladbach	3	(0)

International career^{‡}
2023	Poland U16	1	(0)
2024	Poland U17	6	(0)
2024	Poland U18	2	(1)
2025–	Poland U19	4	(0)
2026–	Poland U20	2	(0)
- * Club domestic league appearances and goals as of 17:30, 11 October 2026 (UTC) ‡ National team caps and goals as of 08:34, 30 September 2026 (UTC)

Jan Leszczyński (born 12 April 2007) is a Polish professional footballer who plays as a centre-back for Bundesliga club Borussia Mönchengladbach.

== Club career ==
Leszczyński joined the youth ranks of Ursus Warsaw before moving to the Legia Warsaw academy as a child. He progressed through Legia's youth system, making more than 40 competitive appearances for the club's under-19 and reserve sides, and featured in the UEFA Youth League during the 2023–24 season. Ahead of the 2023–24 season, he was promoted into Legia's expanded first-team squad. He made his senior Ekstraklasa debut on 13 February 2026, in a 1–1 draw against GKS Katowice at the age of 18. He went on to make three further first-team appearances before the end of the season.

With Legia Warsaw facing financial pressure following their failure to qualify for European competition, the club moved to sell several of its promising young players to bolster its budget. On 5 July 2026, Leszczyński signed for Bundesliga club Borussia Mönchengladbach on a contract until 30 June 2030.

== International career ==
Leszczyński has represented Poland at youth international level continuously since the under-16 category, progressing through the under-17 and under-18 sides before joining the under-19 squad in 2025.

== Career statistics ==
As of match played 11 October 2026

Appearances and goals by club, season and competition
Club	Season	League			National cup (Note: Includes Polish Cup, DFB-Pokal)		Europe		Other		Total	
Club	Season	Division	Apps	Goals	Apps	Goals	Apps	Goals	Apps	Goals	Apps	Goals
Legia Warsaw II	2024–25	III liga, group I	8	1	—		—		—		8	1
Legia Warsaw II	2025–26	III liga, group I	14	1	1	0	—		—		15	1
Legia Warsaw II	Total		22	2	1	0	—		—		23	2
Legia Warsaw	2025–26	Ekstraklasa	4	0	—		—		—		4	0
Borussia Mönchengladbach	2026–27	Bundesliga	3	0	1	0	—		—		4	0
Career total			29	2	2	0	0	0	0	0	31	2

== Honours ==
Legia Warsaw II

- III liga, group I: 2025–26
