= Zento Uno =

Japanese footballer

Zento Uno 宇野 禅斗
Personal information
- Date of birth: 20 November 2003 (age 22)
- Place of birth: Fukushima, Fukushima, Japan
- Height: 1.76 m (5 ft 9 in)
- Position: Midfielder

Team information
- Current team: Borussia Mönchengladbach
- Number: 47

Youth career
- Forte Fukushima FC
- 2016–2018: Aomori Yamada Junior High School
- 2019–2021: Aomori Yamada High School

Senior career*
Years	Team	Apps	(Gls)
2022–2024	Machida Zelvia	31	(3)
2024	→ Shimizu S-Pulse (loan)	12	(2)
2025–2026	Shimizu S-Pulse	44	(1)
2026–	Borussia Mönchengladbach	4	(0)

International career^{‡}
2025–	Japan	2	(0)
- * Club domestic league appearances and goals as of 31 October 2026 ‡ National team caps and goals as of 15 July 2025

Zento Uno (宇野 禅斗, Uno Zento; born 20 November 2003) is a Japanese professional footballer who plays as a midfielder for Bundesliga club Borussia Mönchengladbach and the Japan national team.

== Youth career ==
Uno played football at the Aomori Yamada Junior High School, citing teammate Kuryu Matsuki as a rival, but also an inspiration to push himself harder.

== Club career ==
In November 2021, it was announced that Uno would join J2 League side Machida Zelvia for the 2022 season.

In April 2022, Uno made his professional debut in a 1–1 league draw with JEF United Chiba, appearing as a second-half substitute for Takuya Yasui. After a number of appearances from the bench, Uno started to make his way into the starting XI, but fractured his metatarsal in June which sidelined him for twelve weeks. He did not make another appearance in the season, and ended making nine appearances in his debut season. At the end of the 2022 season, he renewed his contract with Machida Zelvia.

For the 2023 season, he made substitute appearances in the first three games of the season, before falling to another metatarsal injury which kept him out of action until July. His comeback game was a 4–1 win in the Emperor's Cup second round against Yokohama F. Marinos. In October, he scored his first goal for the club, scoring twice in a 3–3 draw with Ventforet Kofu, which included a 97th-minute equalizer. His goalscoring, alongside his tough tackling and distribution, earned him the J2 Monthly MVP award for October. Uno ended up making 20 appearances across all competitions, helping Machida Zelvia become J2 League champions and promoted to the J1 League.

On 18 June 2026, Uno joined German Bundesliga side Borussia Mönchengladbach on a contract until 2030.

== Career statistics ==
=== Club ===
As of match played 31 October 2026

Appearances and goals by club, season and competition
Club	Season	League			National cup (Note: IncludesEmperor's Cup, DFB-Pokal)		League Cup (Note: Includes J.League Cup)		Other		Total	
Club	Season	Division	Apps	Goals	Apps	Goals	Apps	Goals	Apps	Goals	Apps	Goals
Machida Zelvia	2022	J2 League	9	0	0	0	—		—		9	0
Machida Zelvia	2023	J2 League	18	3	2	0	—		—		20	3
Machida Zelvia	2024	J1 League	4	0	0	0	2	0	—		6	0
Machida Zelvia	Total		31	3	2	0	2	0	—		35	3
Shimizu S-Pulse (loan)	2024	J2 League	12	2	0	0	—		—		12	2
Shimizu S-Pulse	2025	J1 League	27	0	1	0	0	0	—		28	0
Shimizu S-Pulse	2026	J1 (100)	17	1	—		—		—		17	1
Shimizu S-Pulse	Total		56	3	1	0	0	0	—		57	3
Borussia Mönchengladbach	2026–27	Bundesliga	4	0	1	0	—		—		5	0
Career total			91	6	4	0	2	0	0	0	97	6

=== International ===
As of match played 15 July 2025

Appearances and goals by national team and year
National team	Year	Apps	Goals
Japan
Japan	2025	2	0
Total		2	0

== Honours ==
Machida Zelvia

- J2 League: 2023

Japan

- EAFF Championship: 2025
