= Lion Schweers =

German footballer

Personal information
- Date of birth: 1 April 1996 (age 30)
- Place of birth: Dortmund, Germany
- Height: 1.88 m (6 ft 2 in)
- Position: Centre back

Team information
- Current team: Borussia Mönchengladbach
- Number: 48

Youth career
- –2014: TSC Eintracht Dortmund
- 2014–2015: Preußen Münster

Senior career*
Years	Team	Apps	(Gls)
2015	Preußen Münster II	11	(1)
2015–2019	Preußen Münster	96	(2)
2019–2021	Würzburger Kickers	6	(0)
2020	→ SV Elversberg (loan)	3	(0)
2021–2024	Wuppertaler SV	86	(17)
2024–	Borussia Mönchengladbach II	60	(7)
2026–	Borussia Mönchengladbach	1	(0)
- * Club domestic league appearances and goals as of 24 October 2026

Lion Schweers (born 1 April 1996) is a German professional footballer who plays as a defender for Bundesliga club Borussia Mönchengladbach.

== Club career ==
After five years at Preußen Münster, Schweers left the club at the end of the 2018–19 season. On 12 July 2019, he joined Würzburger Kickers on a two-year deal. In Würzburg, the defender made five 3. Liga appearances and two regional Bavarian Cup appearances, before being loaned out to Regionalliga Südwest club SV Elversberg until the end of the season in January 2020.
