= Shūto Machino =

Japanese footballer (born 1999)

Shūto Machino 町野 修斗
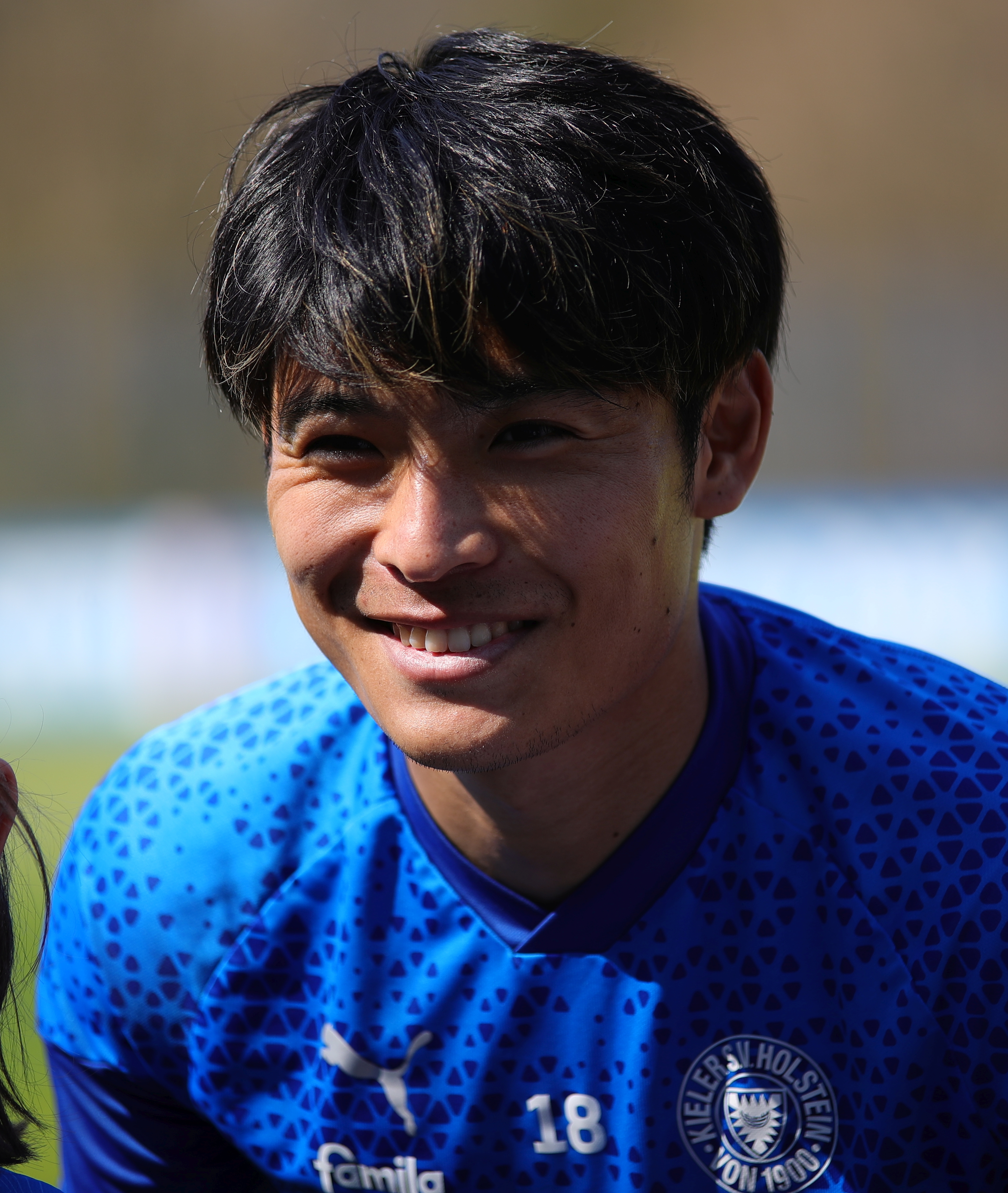
- Machino with Holstein Kiel in 2025

Personal information
- Full name: Shūto Machino
- Date of birth: 30 September 1999 (age 27)
- Place of birth: Iga, Mie, Japan
- Height: 1.85 m (6 ft 1 in)
- Position: Striker

Team information
- Current team: Borussia Mönchengladbach
- Number: 18

Youth career
- FC Nakase SS
- FC Avenida Sol
- 2015–2017: Riseisha High School

Senior career*
Years	Team	Apps	(Gls)
2018–2019	Yokohama F. Marinos	0	(0)
2019	→ Giravanz Kitakyushu (loan)	30	(8)
2020	Giravanz Kitakyushu	32	(7)
2021–2023	Shonan Bellmare	80	(24)
2023–2025	Holstein Kiel	63	(16)
2025–	Borussia Mönchengladbach	38	(5)

International career^{‡}
2022–	Japan	15	(5)
Medal record
Men's football
Representing Japan
EAFF Championship
Winner	2022 Japan	Team
- * Club domestic league appearances and goals as of 31 October 2026 ‡ National team caps and goals as of 30 June 2026

Shūto Machino (町野 修斗, Machino Shūto; born 30 September 1999) is a Japanese professional footballer who plays as a striker for Bundesliga club Borussia Mönchengladbach and the Japan national team.

Machino was called-up for the national team to represent Japan at the 2022 FIFA World Cup in Qatar, as a replacement for the injured Yuta Nakayama.

== Club career ==
=== Before turning professional ===
Influenced by his older brother, he started playing soccer at the age of 3. During Junior High School, he played at FC Avenida Sol. Machino entered Riseisha High School in Osaka and became a regular player in there since the first grade. In his second year, he was selected for the high school selection, which caught the attention of Yokohama F. Marinos, who invited the young player in his third year to participate in trainings with the club. After successfully concluding his trainings, he was evaluated, and officially joined Yokohama F. Marinos from the 2018 season, after his High School graduation.

=== Giravanz Kitakyushu ===
On 1 February 2019, Machino earned a loan transfer to Giravanz Kitakyushu from Yokohama F. Marinos. On Matchweek 11, he scored his first professional goal in his first time starting a match for the club in five games. On Matchweek 12, he scored another goal, scoring then, two goals in two consecutive games. Following decent performances for his club, he became a starting member after the 21st round, when the J3 League resumed after the summer break. He became the team's top scorer at the end of the season.

==== Permanent move ====
On 6 January 2020, he permanently transferred to Giravanz Kitakyushu. After participating in the opening game of the same season, he started 5 consecutive games on the bench. After another league break due to another COVID-19 wave, from the 7th round, he participated in 29 consecutive games. Although he recorded 7 goals and 7 assists in the first half of the season, he was not able to replicate his performances for the remaining of it, having directly contributed to just 2 goals.

=== Shonan Bellmare ===
On 26 December 2020, he was signed to Shonan Bellmare in a permanent transfer. On 21 and 25 May 2022, he scored two braces in two matches, scoring it on Shonan's 2–1 win over Vissel Kobe, and on a 4–0 win against Kawasaki Frontale, becoming the second player in club history since Wagner Lopes in 1998 to score braces in consecutive matches. At the end of the 2022 season, he finished second in the J1 League goalscoring rankings, scoring 13 goals, just one goal behind Brazilian Thiago Santana. Machino ended the season as the Japanese player with most goals scored during the season.

=== Holstein Kiel ===
On 29 June 2023, Machino was announcement officially permanent transfer to 2. Bundesliga club, Holstein Kiel from 2023–24 season.

=== Borussia Mönchengladbach ===
On 26 July 2025, Machino joined Borussia Mönchengladbach on a four-year deal, following Holstein Kiel relegation from the top flight.

== International career ==
On 13 July 2022, Machino was selected for the first time as a member of the Japan national team, which is composed only of domestic groups participating in the 2022 EAFF E-1 Football Championship. On 19 July 2022, he scored two goals, including his first goal for the national team, against Hong Kong in the first match of the EAFF E-1 Football Championship 2022. On 27 July of the same year, he scored the game-deciding third goal in a match against South Korea. He was selected to play in the 2022 FIFA World Cup by Hajime Moriyasu, the then Japan national team's manager, after an injury saw left-back Yuta Nakayama being ruled out of it. He did not make an appearance in the tournament.

In June 2026, Machino was called up to Japan's squad for the 2026 FIFA World Cup, replacing the injured Wataru Endo.

== Career statistics ==
=== Club ===
As of match played 31 October 2026

Appearances and goals by club, season and competition
Club	Season	League			National cup (Note: Includes Emperor's Cup, DFB-Pokal)		League cup (Note: Includes J.League Cup)		Total	
Club	Season	Division	Apps	Goals	Apps	Goals	Apps	Goals	Apps	Goals
Yokohama F. Marinos	2018	J1 League	0	0	0	0	0	0	0	0
Giravanz Kitakyushu (loan)	2019	J3 League	30	8	1	2	–		31	10
Giravanz Kitakyushu	2020	J2 League	32	7	–		–		32	7
Shonan Bellmare	2021	J1 League	31	4	1	0	3	0	35	4
Shonan Bellmare	2022	J1 League	30	13	1	0	8	2	39	15
Shonan Bellmare	2023	J1 League	19	9	0	0	3	0	22	9
Shonan Bellmare	Total		80	24	2	0	14	2	96	28
Holstein Kiel	2023–24	2. Bundesliga	31	5	2	0	–		33	5
Holstein Kiel	2024–25	Bundesliga	32	11	2	1	–		34	12
Holstein Kiel	Total		63	16	4	1	–		67	17
Borussia Mönchengladbach	2025–26	Bundesliga	32	3	2	1	–		34	4
Borussia Mönchengladbach	2026–27	Bundesliga	6	2	2	0	–		8	2
Borussia Mönchengladbach	Total		38	5	4	1	–		42	6
Career total			243	62	11	4	14	2	268	68

=== International ===
As of match played 29 June 2026

Appearances and goals by national team and year
National team	Year	Apps	Goals
Japan	2022	4	3
Japan	2023	1	0
Japan	2025	8	2
Japan	2026	2	0
Total		15	5

Scores and results list Japan's goal tally first, score column indicates score after each Machino goal.

List of international goals scored by Shūto Machino
No.	Date	Venue	Opponent	Score	Result	Competition
1	19 July 2022	Kashima Soccer Stadium, Ibaraki, Japan	Hong Kong	2–0	6–0	2022 EAFF E-1 Football Championship
2	19 July 2022	Kashima Soccer Stadium, Ibaraki, Japan	Hong Kong	6–0	6–0	2022 EAFF E-1 Football Championship
3	27 July 2022	Toyota Stadium, Toyota, Japan	South Korea	3–0	3–0	2022 EAFF E-1 Football Championship
4	10 June 2025	Suita City Football Stadium, Suita, Japan	Indonesia	5–0	6–0	2026 FIFA World Cup qualification
5	18 November 2025	Japan National Stadium, Tokyo, Japan	Bolivia	2–0	3–0	2025 Kirin Challenge Cup

== Honours ==
Japan

- EAFF Championship: 2022

Individual

- EAFF Championship top scorer: 2022
