= Jan Urbich =

German footballer (born 2004)

Personal information
- Date of birth: 23 June 2004 (age 22)
- Place of birth: Wiesbaden, Germany
- Height: 1.88 m (6 ft 2 in)
- Position: Forward

Team information
- Current team: Eintracht Braunschweig (on loan from Borussia Mönchengladbach)
- Number: 27

Youth career
- SV 1895 Neuhof
- –2021: SV Wehen Wiesbaden
- 2021–2023: FV Biebrich

Senior career*
Years	Team	Apps	(Gls)
2022–2023	FV Biebrich	11	(2)
2023–2025	Kickers Offenbach	50	(11)
2025–	Borussia Mönchengladbach II	20	(14)
2025–	Borussia Mönchengladbach	3	(0)
2026–	→ Eintracht Braunschweig (loan)	11	(4)
- * Club domestic league appearances and goals as of 6 November 2026

Jan Urbich (born 23 June 2004) is a German professional footballer who plays as a forward for 2. Bundesliga club Eintracht Braunschweig, on loan from Borussia Mönchengladbach.

== Early life ==
Urbich was born on 23 June 2004. Born in Wiesbaden, Germany, he is a native of the city.

== Career ==
As a youth player, Urbich joined the youth academy of SV 1895 Neuhof. Following his stint there, he joined the youth academy of SV Wehen Wiesbaden. During the summer of 2021, he joined the youth academy of FV Biebrich and was promoted to the club's senior team one year later, where he made eleven league appearances and scored two goals.

Ahead of the 2023–24 season, he signed for Kickers Offenbach, where he made fifty league appearances and scored eleven goals. Two years later, he signed for the reserve team of Bundesliga side Borussia Mönchengladbach and was promoted to the club's senior team the same year.

On 11 June 2026, Urbich was loaned to Eintracht Braunschweig.

== Career statistics ==
As of match played 23 May 2026

Appearances and goals by club, season and competition
Club	Season	League			Cup		Europe		Other		Total	
Club	Season	Division	Apps	Goals	Apps	Goals	Apps	Goals	Apps	Goals	Apps	Goals
FV Biebrich	2022–23	Verbandsliga Hessen-Mitte	11	2	—		—		—		11	2
Kickers Offenbach	2023–24	Regionalliga Südwest	30	5	—		—		3 (Note: Appearances in Hessian Cup)	0	33	5
Kickers Offenbach	2024–25	Regionalliga Südwest	20	6	1	0	—		—		21	6
Kickers Offenbach	Total		50	11	1	0	—		3	0	54	11
Borussia Mönchengladbach II	2025–26	Regionalliga West	20	14	—		—		1 (Note: Appearance in Premier League Cup)	0	21	14
Borussia Mönchengladbach	2025–26	Bundesliga	3	0	0	0	—		—		3	0
Eintracht Braunschweig (loan)	2026–27	2. Bundesliga	0	0	0	0	—		—		0	0
Career total			84	25	1	0	0	0	4	0	89	27
