= Franck Honorat =

French footballer (born 1996)

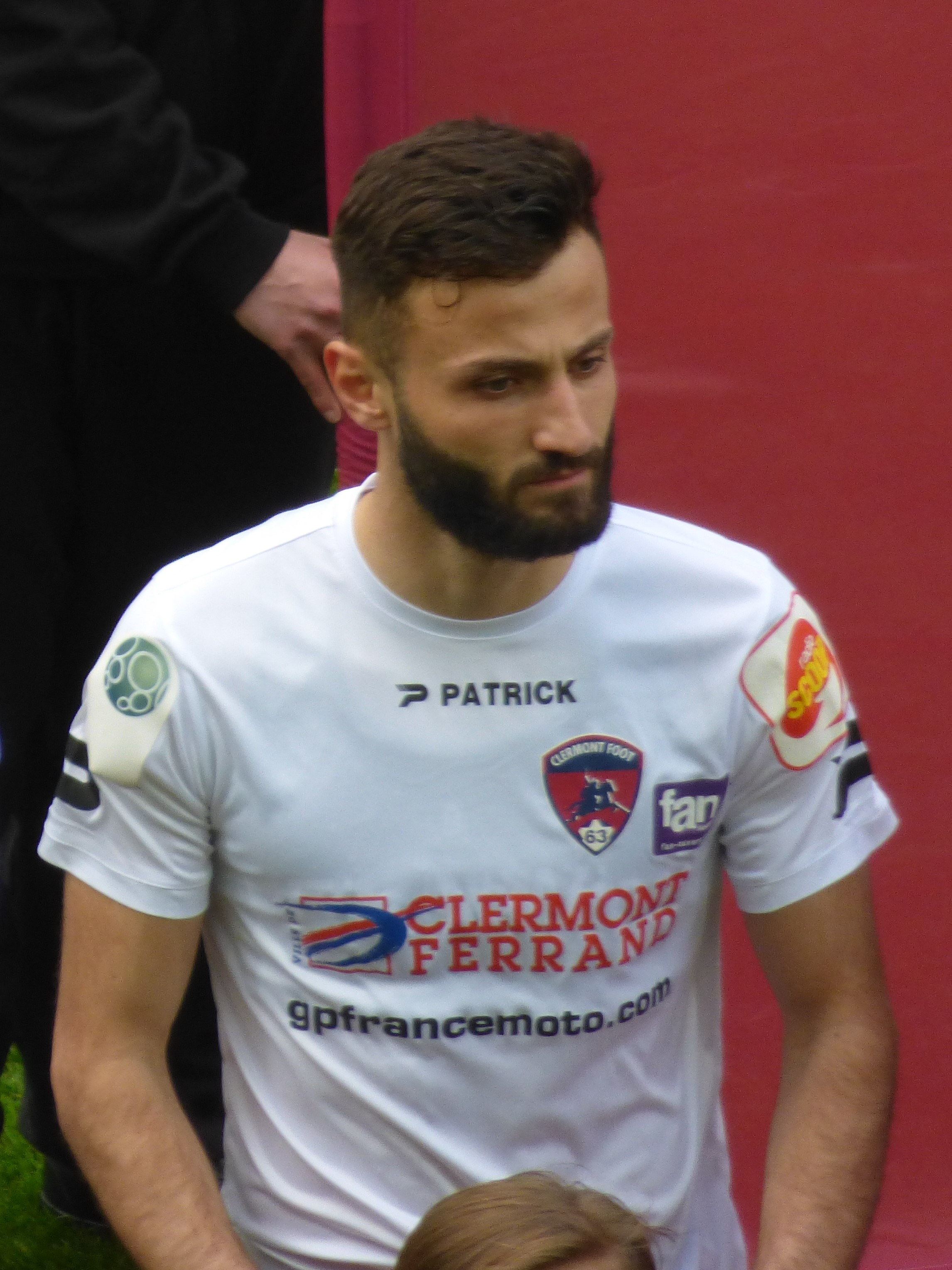
- Honorat with Clermont in 2019

Personal information
- Date of birth: 11 August 1996 (age 30)
- Place of birth: Toulon, France
- Height: 1.80 m (5 ft 11 in)
- Positions: Attacking midfielder; winger

Team information
- Current team: Borussia Mönchengladbach
- Number: 9

Youth career
- 2003–2009: Toulon
- 2009–2011: US Sanaryenne
- 2011–2013: Nice

Senior career*
Years	Team	Apps	(Gls)
2012–2016	Nice B	50	(8)
2013–2017	Nice	19	(0)
2016–2017	→ Sochaux (loan)	23	(0)
2017–2018	Clermont	35	(3)
2018–2020	Saint-Étienne	12	(0)
2019	Saint-Étienne B	1	(0)
2018–2019	→ Clermont (loan)	35	(4)
2020–2023	Brest	103	(25)
2023–	Borussia Mönchengladbach	83	(9)

International career^{‡}
2012	France U16	1	(0)
2012	France U17	5	(0)
2014	France U18	2	(1)
2014	France U19	3	(0)
- * Club domestic league appearances and goals as of 17:30, 19 September 2026 (UTC) ‡ National team caps and goals as of 8 September 2014

Franck Honorat (born 11 August 1996) is a French professional footballer who plays as an attacking midfielder or winger for Bundesliga club Borussia Mönchengladbach.

== Club career ==
=== Nice ===
Honorat made his Ligue 1 debut on 3 November 2013 in a 2–1 home defeat against Bordeaux replacing Christian Brüls after 87 minutes.

=== Saint-Étienne ===
In August 2018, Honorat signed with Ligue 1 side Saint-Étienne. He was loaned back to Clermont of Ligue 2 to finish the 2018–19 season there.

=== Brest ===
On 1 July 2020, Honorat signed a five-year contract with Brest. The deal was worth €5 million. He scored his first goal with Brest on 20 September against Lorient.

=== Borussia Mönchengladbach ===
On 11 July 2023, Bundesliga side Borussia Mönchengladbach announced the signing of Honorat on a five-year contract, until 2028, for a reported fee of €9 million.

== Career statistics ==
As of match played 19 September 2026

Appearances and goals by club, season and competition
Club	Season	League			National cup (Note: Includes Coupe de France, DFB-Pokal)		League cup (Note: Includes Coupe de la Ligue)		Continental		Total	
Club	Season	Division	Apps	Goals	Apps	Goals	Apps	Goals	Apps	Goals	Apps	Goals
Nice B	2012–13	CFA 2	7	0	—		—		—		7	0
Nice B	2013–14	CFA	12	2	—		—		—		12	2
Nice B	2014–15	CFA	15	1	—		—		—		15	1
Nice B	2015–16	CFA	16	5	—		—		—		16	5
Nice B	Total		50	8	0	0	0	0	0	0	50	8
Nice	2013–14	Ligue 1	8	0	0	0	0	0	—		8	0
Nice	2014–15	Ligue 1	5	0	0	0	0	0	—		5	0
Nice	2015–16	Ligue 1	6	0	1	0	0	0	—		7	0
Nice	Total		19	0	1	0	0	0	0	0	20	0
Sochaux (loan)	2016–17	Ligue 2	23	0	1	0	5	1	—		29	1
Sochaux B (loan)	2016–17	CFA 2	6	0	—		—		—		6	0
Clermont	2017–18	Ligue 2	35	3	0	0	3	0	—		38	3
Clermont (loan)	2018–19	Ligue 2	35	4	3	3	1	0	—		39	7
Clermont (loan)	Clermont total		70	7	3	3	4	0	0	0	77	10
Saint-Étienne	2019–20	Ligue 1	12	0	4	0	1	0	2	0	19	0
Saint-Étienne B	2019–20	Championnat National 2	1	0	—		—		—		1	0
Brest	2020–21	Ligue 1	36	8	1	0	—		–		37	8
Brest	2021–22	Ligue 1	34	11	3	0	—		–		37	11
Brest	2022–23	Ligue 1	33	6	2	0	—		–		35	6
Brest	Total		103	25	6	0	0	0	0	0	109	25
Borussia Mönchengladbach	2023–24	Bundesliga	32	3	3	2	—		—		35	5
Borussia Mönchengladbach	2024–25	Bundesliga	19	4	2	1	—		—		21	5
Borussia Mönchengladbach	2025–26	Bundesliga	28	2	2	0	—		—		30	2
Borussia Mönchengladbach	2026–27	Bundesliga	4	0	1	0	—		—		5	0
Borussia Mönchengladbach	Total		83	9	8	3	—		—		91	12
Career total			367	49	23	6	10	1	2	0	402	56

== Honours ==
Saint-Étienne

- Coupe de France runner-up: 2019–20
