= Kevin Stöger =

Austrian footballer

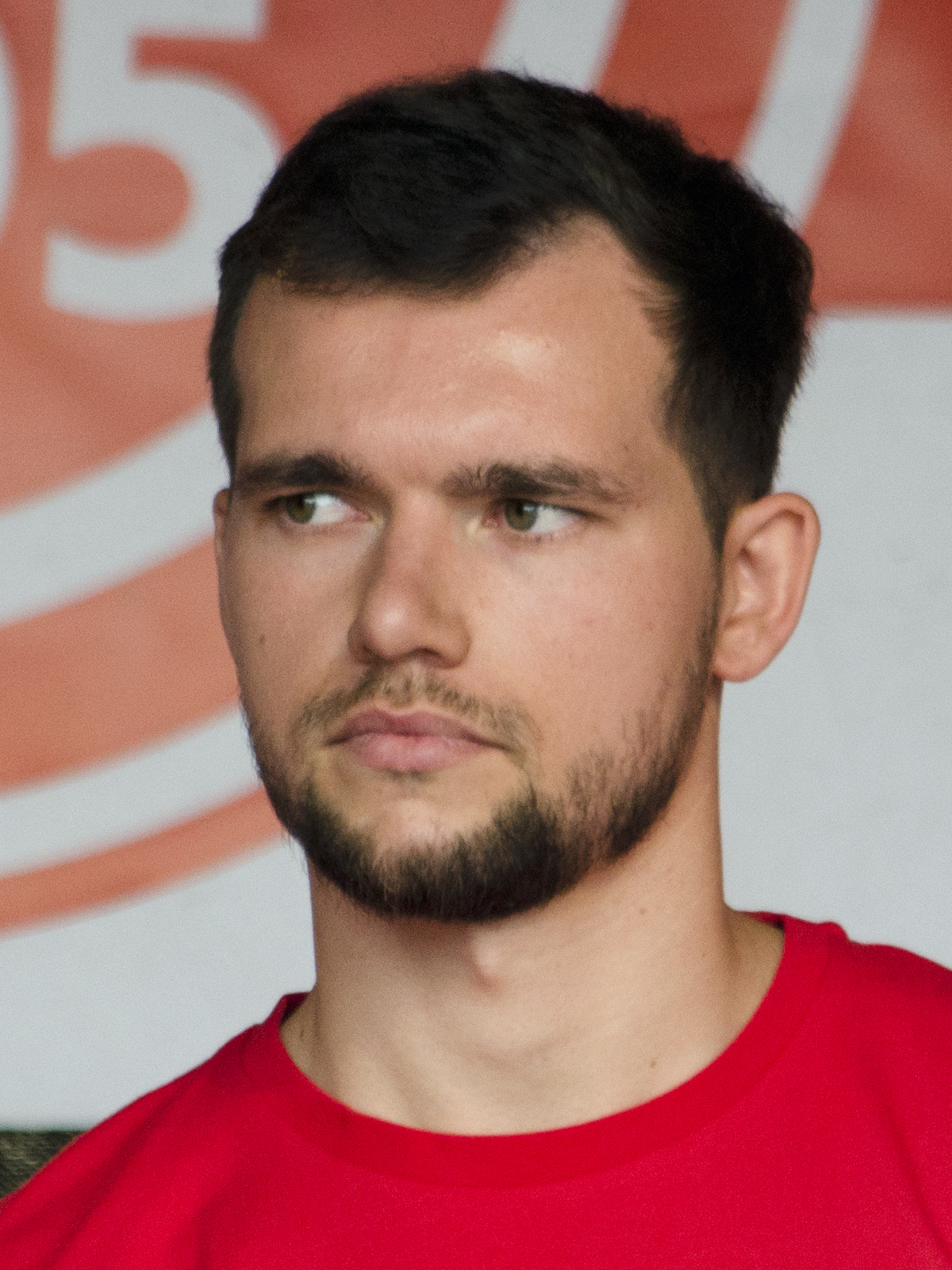
- Stöger in 2019

Personal information
- Date of birth: 27 August 1993 (age 33)
- Place of birth: Steyr, Austria
- Height: 1.75 m (5 ft 9 in)
- Position: Midfielder

Team information
- Current team: Borussia Mönchengladbach
- Number: 7

Youth career
- 1998–2007: ATSV Steyr
- 2007–2009: SV Ried
- 2009–2011: VfB Stuttgart

Senior career*
Years	Team	Apps	(Gls)
2011–2013	VfB Stuttgart II	51	(4)
2012–2015	VfB Stuttgart	0	(0)
2013–2015	→ 1. FC Kaiserslautern (loan)	36	(3)
2013–2014	→ 1. FC Kaiserslautern II (loan)	6	(0)
2015–2016	SC Paderborn	25	(1)
2016–2018	VfL Bochum	37	(5)
2018–2020	Fortuna Düsseldorf	42	(1)
2020–2022	Mainz 05	42	(4)
2022–2024	VfL Bochum	64	(12)
2024–	Borussia Mönchengladbach	63	(4)

International career^{‡}
2008–2009	Austria U16	4	(0)
2009–2010	Austria U17	8	(0)
2010	Austria U18	1	(1)
2011–2012	Austria U19	9	(0)
2012–2014	Austria U21	17	(4)
2024–	Austria	5	(0)
- * Club domestic league appearances and goals as of 19 September 2026 (UTC) ‡ National team caps and goals as of 23 March 2025

Kevin Stöger (born 27 August 1993) is an Austrian professional footballer who plays as a midfielder for Bundesliga club Borussia Mönchengladbach and the Austria national team. He is the younger brother of fellow footballer Pascal Stöger, though both are not related to manager Peter Stöger.

== Club career ==
=== 2010s ===
On 22 January 2011, Stöger debuted for VfB Stuttgart II in the 3. Liga against FC Carl Zeiss Jena.

Stöger was promoted to the first team of VfB Stuttgart ahead of the 2012–13 Fußball-Bundesliga, debuting on 31 October 2012 in the second round of the 2012–13 DFB-Pokal in a 3–0 home victory against FC St. Pauli. He was sent on loan to 1. FC Kaiserslautern until June 2015 before moving to SC Paderborn 07 on 26 August. In June 2016, Stöger joined Bochum on a free transfer until June 2018. then newly promoted Fortuna Düsseldorf on 28 May 2018. He was given the number 22.

=== 2020s ===
On 7 October 2020, Stöger signed for Mainz 05 on a free transfer, on a two-year deal.

On 10 June 2022, Stöger returned to VfL Bochum on a free transfer, signing a two-year contract. In the 2023–24 season, he became the player with most chances created in Bundesliga in 127 occasions.

On 4 June 2024, Stöger signed for Borussia Mönchengladbach on a free transfer until June 2027.

== International career ==
At the age of 17, Stöger was called up into the Austrian squad for the 2011 FIFA U-20 World Cup. On 6 September 2024, he debuted for the Austria national team in a Nations League game against Slovenia at the Stožice Stadium, coming as a substitute to Romano Schmid in the 82nd minute of a 1–1 draw.

== Career statistics ==
=== Club ===
As of match played 19 September 2026

Appearances and goals by club, season and competition
Club	Season	League			Cup		Other		Total	
Club	Season	Division	Apps	Goals	Apps	Goals	Apps	Goals	Apps	Goals
VfB Stuttgart II	2010–11	3. Liga	6	0	—		–		6	0
VfB Stuttgart II	2011–12	3. Liga	23	2	—		–		23	2
VfB Stuttgart II	2012–13	3. Liga	22	2	—		–		22	2
VfB Stuttgart II	Total		51	4	–		–		51	4
VfB Stuttgart	2012–13	Bundesliga	0	0	1	0	–		1	0
1. FC Kaiserslautern II	2013–14	Regionalliga Südwest	6	0	—		–		6	0
1. FC Kaiserslautern	2013–14	2. Bundesliga	6	1	1	0	–		7	1
1. FC Kaiserslautern	2014–15	2. Bundesliga	30	2	3	0	–		33	2
1. FC Kaiserslautern	Total		36	3	4	0	–		40	3
SC Paderborn	2015–16	2. Bundesliga	25	1	1	0	–		26	1
VfL Bochum	2016–17	2. Bundesliga	7	1	1	2	–		8	3
VfL Bochum	2017–18	2. Bundesliga	30	4	2	0	–		32	4
VfL Bochum	Total		37	5	3	2	–		40	7
Fortuna Düsseldorf	2018–19	Bundesliga	25	1	3	1	–		28	2
Fortuna Düsseldorf	2019–20	Bundesliga	17	0	2	1	–		19	1
Fortuna Düsseldorf	Total		42	1	5	2	–		47	3
Mainz 05	2020–21	Bundesliga	19	3	1	0	–		20	3
Mainz 05	2021–22	Bundesliga	23	1	2	0	–		25	1
Mainz 05	Total		42	4	3	0	–		45	4
VfL Bochum	2022–23	Bundesliga	32	5	3	1	–		35	6
VfL Bochum	2023–24	Bundesliga	32	7	1	0	2 (Note: Appearances in Bundesliga relegation play-offs)	1	35	8
VfL Bochum	Total		64	12	4	1	2	1	70	14
Borussia Mönchengladbach	2024–25	Bundesliga	31	3	2	0	—		33	3
Borussia Mönchengladbach	2025–26	Bundesliga	29	1	2	0	—		31	1
Borussia Mönchengladbach	2026–27	Bundesliga	3	0	1	0	—		4	0
Borussia Mönchengladbach	Total		63	4	5	0	—		68	4
Career total			366	34	26	5	2	1	394	35

=== International ===
As of match played 23 March 2025

Appearances and goals by national team and year
National team	Year	Apps	Goals
Austria	2024	3	0
Austria	2025	2	0
Total		5	0
