= Pascal Stöger =

Austrian footballer

Personal information
- Full name: Pascal Stöger
- Date of birth: 7 July 1990 (age 36)
- Place of birth: Austria
- Height: 1.82 m (5 ft 11 1/2 in)
- Position: Midfielder

Team information
- Current team: Union Dietach
- Number: 10

Senior career*
Years	Team	Apps	(Gls)
2008–2009	SV Ried	1	(0)
2009–2010	→ Red Bull Salzburg Juniors (loan)	17	(1)
2010–2011	USK Anif	24	(4)
2011–	Union Dietach		
- * Club domestic league appearances and goals as of 12 May 2012

Pascal Stöger (born 7 July 1990) is an Austrian professional footballer who plays as a midfielder for Union Dietach. He is the brother of Kevin Stöger.
