= Tiago Pereira Cardoso =

Luxembourgish footballer

Personal information
- Date of birth: 7 April 2006 (age 20)
- Place of birth: Esch-sur-Alzette, Luxembourg
- Height: 1.90 m (6 ft 3 in)
- Position: Goalkeeper

Team information
- Current team: RAAL La Louvière (on loan from Borussia Mönchengladbach)
- Number: 16

Youth career
- –2015: CS Sanem
- 2015–2022: Fola Esch
- 2022–2023: Borussia Mönchengladbach

Senior career*
Years	Team	Apps	(Gls)
2023–	Borussia Mönchengladbach II	26	(0)
2025–	Borussia Mönchengladbach	5	(0)
2026–	→ RAAL La Louvière (loan)	0	(0)

International career^{‡}
2019	Luxembourg U15	1	(0)
2021–	Luxembourg U17	9	(0)
2023–	Luxembourg	9	(0)
- * Club domestic league appearances and goals as of 12:43, 6 June 2026 (UTC) ‡ National team caps and goals as of 16:35, 6 October 2026 (UTC)

Tiago Pereira Cardoso (born 7 April 2006) is a Luxembourgish professional footballer who plays as a goalkeeper for Belgian Pro League club La Louvière, on loan from Bundesliga club Borussia Mönchengladbach, and the Luxembourg national team.

== Club career ==
A youth product of CS Sanem and Fola Esch, Pereira Cardoso joined the youth academy of German Bundesliga club Borussia Mönchengladbach in 2022.

On 1 March 2025, Pereira Cardoso was given the chance to start against 1. FC Heidenheim, after both the starting goalkeeper Moritz Nicholas, and Jonas Omlin were out, injured and suspended in the previous match day, respectively. Borussia Mönchengladbach won the game 3-0 and Pereira Cardoso set the new record by becoming the youngest foreign goalkeeper in Bundesliga history.

For the 2026–27 season, Pereira Cardoso was loaned to RAAL La Louvière in the Belgian Pro League.

== International career ==
Born in Luxembourg, Pereira Cardoso is of Portuguese descent. He is a youth international for Luxembourg, having played up to the Luxembourg U17s. He was called up to the senior Luxembourg national team for a set of matches in June 2023. He debuted with the senior Luxembourg team, coming on as a halftime substitute, in a friendly 0–1 loss with Malta on 9 June 2023.

== Career statistics ==
=== Club ===
As of match played 13 March 2026

Appearances and goals by club, season and competition
Club	Season	League			Cup		Europe		Other		Total	
Club	Season	Division	Apps	Goals	Apps	Goals	Apps	Goals	Apps	Goals	Apps	Goals
Borussia Mönchengladbach II	2023–24	Regionalliga West	3	0	—		—		—		3	0
Borussia Mönchengladbach II	2024–25	Regionalliga West	0	0	—		—		—		0	0
Borussia Mönchengladbach II	2025–26	Regionalliga West	23	0	—		—		—		23	0
Borussia Mönchengladbach II	Total		26	0	—		—		—		26	0
Borussia Mönchengladbach	2024–25	Bundesliga	5	0	—		—		—		5	0
Borussia Mönchengladbach	2025–26	Bundesliga	0	0	0	0	—		—		0	0
Borussia Mönchengladbach	Total		5	0	0	0	—		—		5	0
Career total			31	0	0	0	0	0	0	0	31	0

=== International ===
As of match played 6 October 2026

Luxembourg
Year	Apps	Goals
2023	1	0
2024	2	0
2025	3	0
2026	3	0
Total	9	0
