= Iaia Manco Danfa =

Bissau-Guinean footballer (born 2007)

Personal information
- Date of birth: 6 April 2007 (age 19)
- Place of birth: Guinea-Bissau
- Height: 1.70 m (5 ft 7 in)
- Positions: Forward; winger

Team information
- Current team: Borussia Mönchengladbach
- Number: 39

Youth career
- Academia Valusa
- –2024: FC Viktoria 1889 Berlin
- 2024–2025: Berliner AK 07
- 2025–2026: Borussia Mönchengladbach

Senior career*
Years	Team	Apps	(Gls)
2025–	Borussia Mönchengladbach II	17	(6)
2026–	Borussia Mönchengladbach	1	(0)
- * Club domestic league appearances and goals as of 23 October 2026

Iaia Manco Danfa (born 6 April 2007) is a Bissau-Guinean professional footballer who plays as a forward and winger for Bundesliga club Borussia Mönchengladbach.

== Early life ==
Danfa was born on 6 April 2007, in Guinea-Bissau, to a father with Portuguese passport. Growing up, he regarded Portugal international Cristiano Ronaldo as his football idol.

== Career ==
As a youth player, Danfa joined the youth academy of Academia Valusa. Following his stint there, he joined the youth academy of German side FC Viktoria 1889 Berlin.

Subsequently, he joined the youth academy of Berliner AK 07 in Germany in 2024, where he made twenty-seven league appearances and scored thirty-one goals while playing for the club's under-19 team.

One year later, he joined the youth academy of German Bundesliga outfit Borussia Mönchengladbach. On 14 February 2026, he first started for the club's reserve team during a 3–0 away win over SV Rödinghausen in the league. In 2026, he was promoted to their senior team, ahead of the 2026–27 season.

== Style of play ==
Danfa plays as a forward. Right-footed, he is known for his speed and dribbling ability.
