= 2024–25 Borussia Mönchengladbach season =

Borussia Mönchengladbach
2024–25 season
- President: Rainer Bonhof
- Head coach: Gerardo Seoane
- Stadium: Borussia-Park
- Bundesliga: 10th
- DFB-Pokal: Second round
- Top goalscorer: League: Tim Kleindienst (16); All: Tim Kleindienst (16)
- Average home league attendance: 52,867
Home colours	Away colours	Third colours

The 2024–25 season was the 125th season in the history of Borussia Mönchengladbach, and the club's seventeenth consecutive season in the Bundesliga. In addition to the domestic league, the club participated in the DFB-Pokal.

== Friendlies ==
Win Draw Loss Postponed

20 July 2024 Friendly	FC Wegberg-Beeck	0–2	Borussia Mönchengladbach	Waldstadion
15:30		Report	Ranos 45'; Čvančara 48'	Attendance: 2,485; Referee: Dominik Mynarek

25 July 2024 Friendly	Borussia Mönchengladbach	3–1	Fortuna Sittard	Sittard, Netherlands
13:00	Fukuda 49'; Ranos 54'; Kramer 80'	Report	Aïko 48'	Stadium: Fortuna Sittard Stadion; Attendance: 2,981

29 July 2024 Friendly	Borussia Mönchengladbach	1–0	Holstein Kiel	Rottach-Egern
18:00	Ranos 73'			Stadium: Sportplatz Birkenmoos

2 August 2024 Friendly	Borussia Mönchengladbach	3–1	Ipswich Town	Heimstetten
14:30				Stadium: ATS Sportpark Heimstetten

10 August 2024 Friendly	Borussia Mönchengladbach	2–0	Strasbourg	Mönchengladbach
11:00				Stadium: Borussia-Park

10 August 2024 Friendly	Borussia Mönchengladbach	1–0	Strasbourg	Mönchengladbach
15:30				Stadium: Borussia-Park

5 September 2024 Friendly	Borussia Mönchengladbach	4–1	VVV-Venlo

10 October 2024 Friendly	SC Verl	0–5	Borussia Mönchengladbach
18:00

15 November 2024 Friendly	Borussia Mönchengladbach	3–1	Preußen Münster
13:00

5 January 2025 Friendly	Borussia Mönchengladbach	2–2	NEC Nijmegen
13:00

20 March 2025 Friendly	Borussia Mönchengladbach	2–0	Viktoria Köln
12:00

21 May 2025 Friendly	FC Eintracht Rheine	2–4	Borussia Mönchengladbach
18:15

23 May 2025 Friendly	Borussia Neunkirchen	0–5	Borussia Mönchengladbach
18:00

26 May 2025 Friendly	SV Glehn	2–14	Borussia Mönchengladbach
18:00

== Competitions ==
=== Overall record ===
Competition	First match	Last match	Starting round	Final position	Record							
Competition	First match	Last match	Starting round	Final position	Pld	W	D	L	GF	GA	GD	Win %
Bundesliga	23 August 2024	17 May 2025	Matchday 1	10th	34	13	6	15	55	57	−2	38.24
DFB-Pokal	17 August 2024	30 October 2024	First round	Second round	2	1	0	1	4	3	+1	50.00
Total					36	14	6	16	59	60	−1	38.89

Source: Soccerway

=== Bundesliga ===
==== League table ====
Pos	Team	Pld	W	D	L	GF	GA	GD	Pts	Qualification or relegation
8	Werder Bremen	34	14	9	11	54	57	−3	51	
9	VfB Stuttgart	34	14	8	12	64	53	+11	50	Qualification for the Europa League league phase (Note: VfB Stuttgart qualified for the Europa League league phase by winning the 2024–25 DFB-Pokal.)
10	Borussia Mönchengladbach	34	13	6	15	55	57	−2	45	
11	VfL Wolfsburg	34	11	10	13	56	54	+2	43	
12	FC Augsburg	34	11	10	13	35	51	−16	43	

Source: Bundesliga
Rules for classification: 1) Points; 2) Goal difference; 3) Goals scored; 4) Head-to-head results; 5) Head-to-head away goals scored; 6) Away goals scored; 7) Play-off.
(Rules 4–6 only apply after home and away matches have been played between the tied teams.)

==== Results summary ====
Overall								Home						Away					
Pld	W	D	L	GF	GA	GD	Pts	W	D	L	GF	GA	GD	W	D	L	GF	GA	GD
34	13	6	15	55	57	−2	45	7	3	7	29	26	+3	6	3	8	26	31	−5

Source: DFB

==== Results by round ====
Round	1	2	3	4	5	6	7	8	9	10	11	12	13	14	15	16
Ground	H	A	H	A	H	A	H	A	H	A	H	A	H	H	A	H
Result	L	W	L	L	W	L	D	D	W	D	W	L	D	W	W	L
Position	12	6	13	14	11	14	12	9	9	9	6	10	10	11	8	
Points	0	3	3	3	6	6	9	10	13	14	17	17	18	21	24	24

Updated to match(es) played on 11 January 2025. Source: DFB
A = Away; H = Home; W = Win; D = Draw; L = Loss

==== Matches ====
The league schedule was released on 4 July 2024.

23 August 2024 1	Borussia Mönchengladbach	2–3	Bayer Leverkusen	Mönchengladbach
20:30 CEST	Elvedi 59'; Kleindienst 85'; Lainer (yellow card) 90+13'	Report	Xhaka 12'; Wirtz 38', 90+11', (penalty missed) 90+11'	Stadium: Borussia-Park; Attendance: 54,042; Referee: Robert Schröder

31 August 2024 2	VfL Bochum	0–2	Borussia Mönchengladbach	Bochum
15:30 CEST	Pannewig (yellow card) 89'	Report	Kleindienst 67'; Honorat 78'	Stadium: Ruhrstadion; Attendance: 26,000; Referee: Sören Storks

14 September 2024 3	Borussia Mönchengladbach	1–3	VfB Stuttgart	Mönchengladbach
15:30 CEST	Pléa 27'; Weigl (yellow card) 37'; Itakura (yellow card) 90+2'	Report	Vagnoman (yellow card) 14'; Undav 21'; Demirović 58', 61'; Zagadou (yellow card) 89'	Stadium: Borussia-Park; Attendance: 53,756; Referee: Felix Brych

21 September 2024 4	Eintracht Frankfurt	2–0	Borussia Mönchengladbach	Frankfurt
18:30 CEST	Larsson 31'; Theate (yellow card) 39'; Marmoush 80'	Report	Weigl (yellow card) 13'	Stadium: Deutsche Bank Park; Attendance: 58,000; Referee: Tobias Welz

28 September 2024 5	Borussia Mönchengladbach	1–0	Union Berlin	Mönchengladbach
15:30 CEST	Stöger (yellow card) 67'; Scally (yellow card) 69'; Pléa (yellow card) 81'; Čvančara 90+6'	Report	Querfeld (yellow card) 55'	Stadium: Borussia-Park; Attendance: 53,056; Referee: Daniel Schlager

4 October 2024 6	FC Augsburg	2–1	Borussia Mönchengladbach	Augsburg
20:30 CEST (UTC+2)	Schlotterbeck 39'; Claude-Maurice 65'; Rexhbeçaj (yellow card) 73'; Bauer (yellow card) 90+5'	Report	Weigl (yellow card) 59'; Kleindienst 72'; Ranos (yellow card) 84'; Netz (yellow card) 88'; Hack (yellow card) 90+5'	Stadium: WWK Arena; Attendance: 30,660; Referee: Florian Badstübner

19 October 2024 7	Borussia Mönchengladbach	3–2	1. FC Heidenheim	Mönchengladbach
15:30	Itakura 22'; Hack (yellow card) 31'; Kleindienst (yellow card) 53', (goal) 62', 75' (pen.); Weigl (yellow card) 88'	Report	Scienza 12'; Schöppner (yellow card) 39'; Gimber (yellow card) 71'; Pieringer 80' (pen.); Kerber (yellow card) 83'	Stadium: Borussia-Park; Attendance: 50,794; Referee: Daniel Siebert

25 October 2024 8	Mainz 05	1–1	Borussia Mönchengladbach	Mainz
20:30	Lainer 55' (o.g.); Caci (yellow card) 74'; Widmer (yellow card) 89'; Amiri (yellow card) 90+4'	Report	Scally (yellow card) 40'; Kleindienst 57'; Sander (yellow card) 80'; Weigl (yellow card) 88'	Stadium: Mewa Arena; Attendance: 33,000; Referee: Martin Petersen

3 November 2024 9	Borussia Mönchengladbach	4–1	Werder Bremen	Mönchengladbach
17:30	Pléa 11'; Kleindienst 12'; Honorat 45'; Stöger 67'; Itakura (yellow card) 79'	Report	Agu (yellow card) 19'; Weiser (yellow card) 22' (yellow-red card) 82'; Lynen (yellow card) 53'; Topp 76'	Stadium: Borussia-Park; Referee: Bastian Dankert

9 November 2024 10	RB Leipzig	0–0	Borussia Mönchengladbach	Leipzig
18:30	Vermeeren (yellow card) 51'; Haidara (yellow card) 89'	Report	Hack (yellow card) 41'; Reitz (yellow card) 44'	Stadium: Red Bull Arena; Attendance: 46,887; Referee: Christian Dingert

24 November 2024 11	Borussia Mönchengladbach	2–0	FC St. Pauli	Mönchengladbach
17:30	Pléa 13'; Kleindienst 44'; Ullrich (yellow card) 54'	Report		Stadium: Borussia-Park; Attendance: 54,042; Referee: Robin Braun

30 November 2024 12	SC Freiburg	3–1	Borussia Mönchengladbach	Freiburg
15:30	Höler 41', 63'; Doan 49'; Höfler (yellow card) 70'	Report	Hack (yellow card) 53'; Kleindienst 61'	Stadium: Europa-Park Stadion; Attendance: 34,700; Referee: Robert Hartmann

7 December 2024 13	Borussia Mönchengladbach	1–1	Borussia Dortmund	Mönchengladbach
18:30	Weigl (yellow card) 30'; Stöger 71' (pen.); Čvančara (yellow card) 90+4' (yellow-red card) 90+5'	Report	Schlotterbeck (yellow card) 47'; Gittens 65'; Groß (yellow card) 70'	Stadium: Borussia-Park; Attendance: 54,042; Referee: Tobias Stieler

14 December 2024 14	Borussia Mönchengladbach	4–1	Holstein Kiel	Mönchengladbach
15:30	Kleindienst 1'; Hack 26'; Pléa 43', 79'; Scally (yellow card) 69'	Report	Gigović 30'; Remberg (yellow card) 77'	Stadium: Borussia-Park; Attendance: 52,210; Referee: Daniel Schlager

21 December 2024 15	TSG Hoffenheim	1–2	Borussia Mönchengladbach	Sinsheim
15:30	Kramarić 58' (pen.)	Report	Sander 23'; Pléa 61'	Stadium: PreZero Arena; Attendance: 28,923; Referee: Bastian Dankert

11 January 2025 16	Borussia Mönchengladbach	0–1	Bayern Munich	Mönchengladbach
18:30	Scally (yellow card) 53'; Ullrich (yellow card) 66'; Weigl (yellow card) 90'	Report	Kane 68' (pen.); Kim (yellow card) 81'	Stadium: Borussia-Park; Attendance: 54,042; Referee: Felix Zwayer

14 January 2025 17	VfL Wolfsburg	5–1	Borussia Mönchengladbach	Wolfsburg
20:30	Wind 3' (pen.); Arnold (yellow card) 41', (goal) 75'; Mæhle 60'; Nmecha 84', 87'	Report	Fukuda 89'	Stadium: Volkswagen Arena; Attendance: 20,519; Referee: Florian Badstübner

18 January 2025 18	Bayer Leverkusen	3–1	Borussia Mönchengladbach	Leverkusen
18:30	Wirtz 32', 62' (pen.); Schick 74'	Report	Čvančara (yellow card) 59'; Kleindienst 90+1'; Lainer (yellow card) 90+4'	Stadium: BayArena; Attendance: 30,210; Referee: Harm Osmers

25 January 2025 19	Borussia Mönchengladbach	3–0	VfL Bochum	Mönchengladbach
18:30	Elvedi (yellow card) 26'; Reitz 34'; Hack 55'; Kleindienst 86'	Report	Passlack (yellow card) 57'; Holtmann (yellow card) 81'; Drewes (yellow card) 85'	Stadium: Borussia-Park; Attendance: 54,042; Referee: Matthias Jöllenbeck

1 February 2025 20	VfB Stuttgart	1–2	Borussia Mönchengladbach	Stuttgart

8 February 2025 21	Borussia Mönchengladbach	1–1	Eintracht Frankfurt	Mönchengladbach

15 February 2025 22	Union Berlin	1–2	Borussia Mönchengladbach	Berlin

22 February 2025 23	Borussia Mönchengladbach	0–3	FC Augsburg	Mönchengladbach

1 March 2025 24	1. FC Heidenheim	0–3	Borussia Mönchengladbach	Heidenheim

7 March 2025 25	Borussia Mönchengladbach	1–3	Mainz 05	Mönchengladbach

15 March 2025 26	Werder Bremen	2–4	Borussia Mönchengladbach	Bremen

29 March 2025 27	Borussia Mönchengladbach	1–0	RB Leipzig	Mönchengladbach

6 April 2025 28	FC St. Pauli	1–1	Borussia Mönchengladbach	Hamburg

12 April 2025 29	Borussia Mönchengladbach	1–2	SC Freiburg	Mönchengladbach

20 April 2025 30	Borussia Dortmund	3–2	Borussia Mönchengladbach	Dortmund

26 April 2025 31	Holstein Kiel	4–3	Borussia Mönchengladbach	Kiel

3 May 2025 32	Borussia Mönchengladbach	2–2	TSG Hoffenheim	Mönchengladbach

10 May 2025 33	Bayern Munich	2–0	Borussia Mönchengladbach	Munich

17 May 2025 34	Borussia Mönchengladbach	0–1	VfL Wolfsburg	Mönchengladbach

=== DFB-Pokal ===
17 August 2024 First round	Erzgebirge Aue	1–3	Borussia Mönchengladbach	Aue
13:00 CEST	Clausen 8'; Hoffmann (yellow card) 45+4'; Jakob (yellow card) 51'; Männel (yellow card) 53'	Report	Honorat 34'; Weigl (penalty missed) 45+5'; Netz 52'; Pléa 70'	Stadium: Erzgebirgsstadion; Attendance: 14,811; Referee: Florian Badstübner

30 October 2024 Second round	Eintracht Frankfurt	2–1	Borussia Mönchengladbach	Frankfurt
18:00 CET	Theate (red card) 15'; Ekitike 45+2'; Brown (yellow card) 52'; Marmoush 70'; Trapp (yellow card) 90+6'	Report	Itakura 47'; Ullrich (yellow card) 60'; Weigl (yellow card) 63'; Friedrich (yellow card) 80'; Čvančara (yellow card) 90+4'	Stadium: Waldstadion; Attendance: 58,000; Referee: Matthias Jöllenbeck

== Transfers ==
=== In ===
Pos.	Player	Transferred from	Fee	Date	Source
MF	(Germany) Philipp Sander	(Germany) Holstein Kiel	€1,000,000	1 July 2024	
MF	(Austria) Kevin Stöger	(Germany) VfL Bochum	Free	1 July 2024	
MF	(Germany) Charles Herrmann	(Germany) Borussia Dortmund	Free	1 July 2024	
FW	(Germany) Tim Kleindienst	(Germany) 1. FC Heidenheim	€7,000,000	1 July 2024	
GK	(Luxembourg) Tiago Pereira Cardoso	(Luxembourg) CS Fola Esch		1 March 2025	

=== Out ===
Pos.	Player	Transferred to	Fee	Date	Source
DF	(France) Mamadou Doucouré	—N/a	End of contract	1 July 2024	
MF	(Germany) Patrick Herrmann	Retired		1 July 2024	
DF	(Germany) Tony Jantschke	Retired		1 July 2024	
GK	(Germany) Jonas Kersken	(Germany) Arminia Bielefeld	€300,000	1 July 2024	
MF	(France) Manu Koné	(Italy) Roma	€18,000,000	30 August 2024	
