= Borussia Mönchengladbach II =

Football club in Germany

- Full name: Borussia VfL 1900 Mönchengladbach e.V.
- Ground: Grenzlandstadion
- Capacity: 10,000
- Manager: Michael Enache
- League: Regionalliga West (IV)
- 2025–26: Regionalliga West, 6th of 18
Home colours	Away colours	Third colours

Borussia Mönchengladbach II is a German association football club from the town of Mönchengladbach, North Rhine-Westphalia. It is the reserve team of Borussia Mönchengladbach.

The team's greatest success has been promotion to the tier four Regionalliga West where it won a league championship in 2014–15. It has also taken part in the first round of the DFB-Pokal, the German Cup, on one occasion, courtesy of a Lower Rhine Cup win.

== History ==
The team first won promotion to the highest league in the Lower Rhine region, the tier four Verbandsliga Niederrhein, in 1980. It played at this level for the next seventeen seasons, generally as a mid-table side. At regular intervals the side managed to finish third but only in 1997 was it finally able to win a league championship and earn promotion to the Oberliga Nordrhein. In the same season it finally earned promotion when it won the Lower Rhine Cup and thereby qualified for the German Cup for the first and only time. It entered the 1997–98 DFB-Pokal where it lost 1–0 to VfB Stuttgart in the first round.

Borussia Mönchengladbach II played in the Oberliga for the next nine seasons, finishing in the top half of the table each year. After runners-up finishes in 2003 and 2005 the team won a league championship in 2006 and earned promotion to the tier three Regionalliga Nord. It played for one season in this league, was relegated and earned another Oberliga championship the year after to return to the Regionalliga. With the introduction of the 3. Liga in 2008 the Regionalligas were expanded from two to three and Borussia became part of the new Regionalliga West. After a good first season the team finished on a relegation rank in its second but was spared because of a number of Regionalliga teams having their license revoked. From 2010 onwards the side improved, achieving upper table finishes which culminated in a league championship in 2015. The latter qualified the team for the promotion round to the 3. Liga, where it missed out on promotion to SV Werder Bremen II.

== Honours ==
The club's honours:

=== League ===
- Regionalliga West
  - Champions: 2015
- Oberliga Nordrhein
  - Champions: 2006, 2008
- Verbandsliga Niederrhein
  - Champions: 1997
- Landesliga Niederrhein
  - Champions: 1980

=== Cup ===
- Lower Rhine Cup
  - Winners: 1997

== Recent seasons ==
The recent season-by-season performance of the club:

Season	Division	Tier	Position
2003–04	Oberliga Nordrhein	IV	3rd
2004–05	Oberliga Nordrhein	IV	2nd
2005–06	Oberliga Nordrhein	IV	1st ↑
2006–07	Regionalliga Nord	III	16th↓
2007–08	Oberliga Nordrhein	IV	1st ↑
2008–09	Regionalliga West	IV	6th
2009–10	Regionalliga West	IV	16th
2010–11	Regionalliga West	IV	5th
2011–12	Regionalliga West	IV	3rd
2012–13	Regionalliga West	IV	7th
2013–14	Regionalliga West	IV	7th
2014–15	Regionalliga West	IV	1st
2015–16	Regionalliga West	IV	2nd
2016–17	Regionalliga West	IV	3rd
2017–18	Regionalliga West	IV	12th
2018–19	Regionalliga West	IV	4th
2019–20	Regionalliga West	IV	8th
2020–21	Regionalliga West	IV	11th
2021–22	Regionalliga West	IV	13th
2022–23	Regionalliga West	IV	3rd
2023–24	Regionalliga West	IV	12th
2024–25	Regionalliga West	IV	7th
2025–26	Regionalliga West	IV	6th

- With the introduction of the Regionalligas in 1994 and the 3. Liga in 2008 as the new third tier, below the 2. Bundesliga, all leagues below dropped one tier.

↑ Promoted	↓ Relegated

== Borussia Mönchengladbach II (reserve team) ==
=== Current squad ===
The team currently competes in the Regionalliga West. It also participates in the Premier League International Cup. Michael Enache has been the head coach since July 2026. Players in bold are those who have been called-up and/or featured with the senior squad.

As of 4 September 2026

Note: Flags indicate national team as defined under FIFA eligibility rules; some limited exceptions apply. Players may hold more than one non-FIFA nationality.

No.	Pos.	Nation	Player
2	DF	GER	Simon Walde
4	DF	DEN	Tristan Top-Rasmussen
7	MF	GER	Antonio Jozanović
8	MF	TUR	Kemal Çırpan
9	FW	GER	Justin Adozi
10	MF	GER	Nico Vidić
11	FW	GER	Kerim Karyagdi
14	DF	GER	Chris Beyersdorf
17	FW	GER	Karim Affo
18	FW	FIN	Sulo Ketola
19	DF	GER	Dillon Berko
21	MF	FIN	Taavi Koukkumäki
22	DF	UKR	Artem Muradyan
23	MF	GER	Michel Lieder
24	MF	GER	**Fritz Fleck**

No.	Pos.	Nation	Player
25	DF	GER	**Lion Schweers**
29	MF	AUT	Jakob Zickler
30	FW	GER	Thilo Töpken
32	GK	GER	Tim Pfeiffer
34	MF	GER	**Mathieu Nguefack**
35	FW	GER	Josiah Uwakhonye
37	DF	GER	David Igboanugo
39	FW	GBS	**Iaia Manco Danfa**
40	MF	TUR	Tuncay Durna
41	GK	GER	Maximilian Neutgens
42	DF	GER	Elias Vali Fard
43	DF	GER	Tyler Meiser
44	GK	GER	Marcello Trippel
49	DF	MAR	Joseph Bellahsen
—	MF	GER	Marlon Siebert

=== Out on loan ===
Note: Flags indicate national team as defined under FIFA eligibility rules; some limited exceptions apply. Players may hold more than one non-FIFA nationality.

No.	Pos.	Nation	Player
—	GK	LUX	Tiago Pereira Cardoso (at RAAL La Louvière until 30 June 2027)
—	MF	CRO	Niko Horvat (at Zulte Waregem until 30 June 2027)

No.	Pos.	Nation	Player
—	MF	GER	Niklas Swider (at Viktoria Köln until 30 June 2027)
—	FW	GER	Jan Urbich (at Eintracht Braunschweig until 30 June 2027)

== Youth Sector (academy) ==
The Borussia Mönchengladbach academy has produced and developed many players every season, including both youth and senior international players over the years, not only German internationals such as Lothar Matthäus, Jupp Heynckes, Marc-André ter Stegen, Marcell Jansen, Malick Thiaw, Patrick Herrmann, and Mahmoud Dahoud, but from over the world, such as Poland's midfielder Eugen Polanski, Ukraine's forward Andriy Voronin, Ghana's midfielder Lawrence Aidoo, DR Congo's forward Elias Kachunga, Nigeria's goalkeeper Maduka Okoye, Turkey's midfielder Yunus Mallı, Guinea-Bissau's midfielder Famana Quizera, Rwanda's forward Leroy-Jacques Mickels, Iran's forward Dennis Eckert, Switzerland's forward Winsley Boteli, Luxembourg's goalkeeper Tiago Pereira Cardoso and forward Yvandro Borges Sanches, among others.

== Youth Sector squads ==
=== Under-19 squad (U19) ===
As of 24 July 2026

Note: Flags indicate national team as defined under FIFA eligibility rules; some limited exceptions apply. Players may hold more than one non-FIFA nationality.

No.	Pos.	Nation	Player
3	DF	GER	Rio Bromfield
15	DF	BEL	Destini Megogo
16	FW	GER	Asher Artz
17	FW	GER	Mika Van Lipzig
21	MF	BIH	Armin Spahić
22	GK	GER	Aidan Jericho
23	MF	GER	Edin Biber
25	DF	GER	Ben Schiffer
26	FW	POL	Jakub Peret
27	DF	GER	Roman Lashkary
—	GK	GER	Joshua Thimm
—	DF	GER	Leander Davids
—	DF	GER	Jesse Ernst

No.	Pos.	Nation	Player
—	DF	NED	Kas Hendrix
—	DF	GER	Louis Hönning
—	MF	GER	Abdul Al-Khalaf
—	MF	LUX	Oriol Fernandez Berenguer
—	MF	SWE	Samin Mujevic
—	MF	KOS	Diamant Rushiti
—	MF	GER	Marlon Siebert
—	MF	GER	Noel Trostjanezki
—	MF	JPN	Shinnosuke Yamakawa
—	FW	GER	Radin Khorsandi
—	FW	GER	Šimon Neugebauer
—	FW	ROU	Rareș Silitră
—	FW	CZE	Filip Zahálka

=== Under-17 squad (U17) ===
As of 24 July 2026

Note: Flags indicate national team as defined under FIFA eligibility rules; some limited exceptions apply. Players may hold more than one non-FIFA nationality.

No.	Pos.	Nation	Player
—	GK	GER	Lasse Leipold
—	GK	GER	Florian Knoben
—	GK	GER	Simon Urban
—	DF	GER	Niels Hagedorn
—	DF	GER	Rafael Karas
—	DF	BEL	Maxim Lagos
—	DF	GER	Nils Peters
—	DF	GER	Philipp Schubert
—	DF	TUR	Ozan Sulaksu
—	DF	LUX	Luke Tenkanen
—	DF	GER	Joel Uwakhonye
—	MF	GER	Lukas Andree
—	MF	CRO	Ivan Ćaleta

No.	Pos.	Nation	Player
—	MF	TUR	Salih Yuşa Canım
—	MF	GER	Erik Corominas Campistany
—	MF	GER	Piet Sautner
—	MF	GER	Felix Schlößer
—	MF	GER	Charly Vanchaze
—	FW	KOS	Aldrin Asani
—	FW	BEL	Léo Doll
—	FW	ITA	Maximilian Donner
—	FW	GER	Paul Ingenfeld
—	FW	GER	Johann Ngongang
—	FW	NED	Kenny Vestjens
—	FW	GER	Paul Luka Zenz

== Technical staff ==
The following staff are in charge of the various age groups:

Role	Reserve team	Under-19 (U19)	Under-17 (U17)
Head coach	(Germany) Michael Enache	(Austria) Daniel Mair	(Germany) Denis Hauswald
Assistant coaches	(Germany) Oliver Neuville	(Cameroon) Marcel Ndjeng	(Germany) Nils Wüsten
Assistant coaches	(Germany) Daniel Ginczek	—N/a	(Germany) Christian Ziege
Goalkeeping coach	(Germany) Nico Stremlau	(Poland) Marcin Skowronek	(Poland) Martin Kompalla
Athletic coach	(Germany) Thomas Gründobler	(Germany) Kai Clausmeier	(Belgium) Noah Reinertz
