= 2021–22 Borussia Mönchengladbach season =

Borussia Mönchengladbach
2021–22 season
- President: Rolf Königs
- Head coach: Adi Hütter
- Stadium: Borussia-Park
- Bundesliga: 10th
- DFB-Pokal: Round of 16
- Top goalscorer: League: Jonas Hofmann (12); All: Jonas Hofmann (12)
Home colours	Away colours	Third colours

The 2021–22 season was the 122nd season in the existence of Borussia Mönchengladbach and the club's 14th consecutive season in the top flight of German football. In addition to the domestic league, Borussia Mönchengladbach participated in this season's edition of the DFB-Pokal.

== Players ==
=== First-team squad ===
As of 31 January 2022

Note: Flags indicate national team as defined under FIFA eligibility rules; some limited exceptions apply. Players may hold more than one non-FIFA nationality.

No.	Pos.	Nation	Player
1	GK	SUI	Yann Sommer (vice-captain)
4	DF	FRA	Mamadou Doucouré
5	DF	GER	Marvin Friedrich
6	MF	GER	Christoph Kramer
7	FW	GER	Patrick Herrmann
10	FW	FRA	Marcus Thuram
13	MF	GER	Lars Stindl (captain)
14	FW	FRA	Alassane Pléa
15	DF	GER	Jordan Beyer
17	DF	FRA	Kouadio Koné
18	DF	AUT	Stefan Lainer
20	DF	GER	Luca Netz
21	GK	GER	Tobias Sippel

No.	Pos.	Nation	Player
22	MF	SVK	László Bénes
23	MF	GER	Jonas Hofmann
24	DF	GER	Tony Jantschke
25	DF	ALG	Ramy Bensebaini
28	DF	GER	Matthias Ginter
29	DF	USA	Joe Scally
30	DF	SUI	Nico Elvedi
32	MF	GER	Florian Neuhaus
34	MF	IRL	Conor Noß
36	FW	SUI	Breel Embolo
37	FW	ENG	Keanan Bennetts
41	GK	GER	Jan Olschowsky
46	GK	GER	Jonas Kersken

=== Players out on loan ===
Note: Flags indicate national team as defined under FIFA eligibility rules; some limited exceptions apply. Players may hold more than one non-FIFA nationality.

No.	Pos.	Nation	Player
—	MF	GER	Torben Müsel (on loan to KAS Eupen until 30 June 2022)
—	GK	GER	Moritz Nicolas (on loan to Viktoria Köln until 30 June 2022)
—	DF	DEN	Andreas Poulsen (on loan to FC Ingolstadt until 30 June 2022)
—	MF	POR	Famana Quizera (on loan to Académico Viseu until 30 June 2022)
—	MF	GER	Rocco Reitz (on loan to Sint-Truiden until 30 June 2022)
—	MF	AUT	Hannes Wolf (on loan to Swansea City until 30 June 2022)

== Transfers ==
=== In ===
No.	Pos.	Player	Transferred from	Fee	Date	Source
11	MF	Hannes Wolf (AUT)	RB Leipzig (GER)	€9,000,000	1 July 2021	
20	DF	Luca Netz (GER)	Hertha BSC (GER)	Undisclosed	6 August 2021	
5	DF	Marvin Friedrich (GER)	Union Berlin (GER)	Undisclosed	11 January 2022	

=== Out ===
No.	Pos.	Player	Transferred to	Fee	Date	Source
16	MF	Ibrahima Traoré (GUI)		Free	1 July 2021	
17	DF	Oscar Wendt (SWE)	IFK Göteborg (SWE)	Free	1 July 2021	
20	FW	Julio Villalba (PAR)		Free	1 July 2021	
31	GK	Max Grün (GER)	Viktoria Aschaffenburg (GER)	Free	1 July 2021	
	GK	Moritz Nicolas (GER)	Viktoria Köln (GER)	Loan	15 July 2021	
3	DF	Michael Lang (SUI)	Basel (SUI)	Undisclosed	19 July 2021	
43	MF	Rocco Reitz (GER)	Sint-Truiden (BEL)	Loan	3 August 2021	
40	DF	Andreas Poulsen (DEN)	FC Ingolstadt (GER)	Loan	19 August 2021	
27	MF	Famana Quizera (POR)	Académico Viseu (POR)	Loan	1 September 2021	
26	MF	Torben Müsel (GER)	KAS Eupen (BEL)	Loan	18 January 2022	
11	MF	Hannes Wolf (AUT)	Swansea City (WAL)	Loan	20 January 2022	
8	MF	Denis Zakaria (SUI)	Juventus (ITA)	Undisclosed	31 January 2022	

== Pre-season and friendlies ==
Win Draw Loss

10 July 2021 Friendly	Borussia Mönchengladbach	2–2	Viktoria Köln	Mönchengladbach, Germany
15:30 CEST (UTC+2)	Bensebaini 6'; Herrmann 76'	Report	Lorch 8'; Jantschke 17' (o.g.)	Stadium: RSV-Stadion; Attendance: 990; Referee: Niklas Dardenne

17 July 2021 Friendly	SC Paderborn	3–1	Borussia Mönchengladbach	Paderborn, Germany
15:00 CEST (UTC+2)	Hünemeier 14'; Heuer 54'; Srbeny 61'	Report	Noß 58'	Stadium: Benteler-Arena; Attendance: 2,413; Referee: Thorben Siewer

24 July 2021 Friendly	Borussia Mönchengladbach	1–0	Metz	Mönchengladbach, Germany
15:30 CEST (UTC+2)	Ashraf (yellow card) 74'; Noß 87'	Report		Stadium: Fohlenplatz; Attendance: 630; Referee: Kevin Domnick

28 July 2021 Friendly	Bayern Munich	0–2	Borussia Mönchengladbach	Munich, Germany
18:00 CEST (UTC+2)		Report	Wolf 60'; Wenzel 77'	Stadium: Allianz Arena; Referee: Robert Hartmann

31 July 2021 Friendly	Borussia Mönchengladbach	2–1	Groningen	Mönchengladbach, Germany
15:30 CEST (UTC+2)	Stindl 15'; Matusiwa 40' (o.g.); Wolf (yellow card) 58'	Report	Matusiwa (yellow card) 27'; De Leeuw 48'	Stadium: Borussia-Park; Attendance: 5,000

8 January 2022 Friendly	Borussia Mönchengladbach	2–3	Viktoria Köln	Mönchengladbach, Germany
13:30 CET (UTC+1)	Bénes 4'; Pléa 62'	Report	Hong 21', 58'; Sontheimer 83'	Stadium: Fohlenplatz; Attendance: 0 Referee: Robin Braun

11 May 2022 Global Tour for Peace	Borussia Mönchengladbach	1–2	Ukraine	Mönchengladbach, Germany
20:45 CEST (UTC+2)	Noß 14'	Report	Mudryk 9'; Pikhalyonok 82'	Stadium: Borussia Park; Attendance: 20,223; Referee: Denys Shurman

== Competitions ==
=== Overall record ===
Competition	First match	Last match	Starting round	Final position	Record							
Competition	First match	Last match	Starting round	Final position	Pld	W	D	L	GF	GA	GD	Win %
Bundesliga	13 August 2021	14 May 2022	Matchday 1	10th	34	12	9	13	54	61	−7	35.29
DFB-Pokal	9 August 2021	19 January 2022	First round	Round of 16	3	2	0	1	6	3	+3	66.67
Total					37	14	9	14	60	64	−4	37.84

Source: Soccerway

=== Bundesliga ===
==== League table ====
Pos	Team	Pld	W	D	L	GF	GA	GD	Pts	Qualification or relegation
8	Mainz 05	34	13	7	14	50	45	+5	46	
9	1899 Hoffenheim	34	13	7	14	58	60	−2	46	
10	Borussia Mönchengladbach	34	12	9	13	54	61	−7	45	
11	Eintracht Frankfurt	34	10	12	12	45	49	−4	42	Qualification for the Champions League group stage (Note: Eintracht Frankfurt qualified for the Champions League group stage by winning the UEFA Europa League.)
12	VfL Wolfsburg	34	12	6	16	43	54	−11	42	

Source: DFB
Rules for classification: 1) Points; 2) Goal difference; 3) Goals scored; 4) Head-to-head results; 5) Head-to-head away goals scored; 6) Away goals scored; 7) Play-off.

==== Results summary ====
Overall								Home						Away					
Pld	W	D	L	GF	GA	GD	Pts	W	D	L	GF	GA	GD	W	D	L	GF	GA	GD
34	12	9	13	54	61	−7	45	8	4	5	33	27	+6	4	5	8	21	34	−13

Source: DFB

==== Results by round ====
Round	1	2	3	4	5	6	7	8	9	10	11	12	13	14	15	16	17	18	19	20	21	22	23	24	25	26	27	28	29	30	31	32	33	34
Ground	H	A	A	H	A	H	A	H	A	H	A	H	A	H	A	H	A	A	H	H	A	H	A	H	A	H	A	H	A	H	A	H	A	H
Result	D	L	L	W	L	W	W	D	L	W	D	W	L	L	L	L	D	W	L	L	D	W	L	D	L	W	W	D	W	L	D	W	D	W
Position	7	14	15	11	16	11	10	10	12	10	9	9	11	13	13	14	14	12	12	12	13	13	13	13	14	14	11	12	11	11	11	10	10	10

Source: DFB
A = Away; H = Home; W = Win; D = Draw; L = Loss

==== Matches ====
The league fixtures were announced on 25 June 2021.

13 August 2021 1	Borussia Mönchengladbach	1–1	Bayern Munich	Mönchengladbach
20:30 CEST (UTC+2)	Pléa 10'; Stindl (yellow card) 58'; Neuhaus (yellow card) 90+1'	Report	Lewandowski 42'	Stadium: Borussia-Park; Attendance: 22,925; Referee: Marco Fritz

21 August 2021 2	Bayer Leverkusen	4–0	Borussia Mönchengladbach	Leverkusen
18:30 CEST (UTC+2)	Sommer 3' (o.g.); Schick 8'; Demirbay (yellow card) 34'; Bakker (yellow card) 41'; Paulinho (yellow card) 48'; Diaby 55', (yellow card) 90+1'; Amiri 87'	Report	Stindl (penalty missed) 43'; Kramer (yellow card) 75'; Wolf (yellow card) 76'	Stadium: BayArena; Attendance: 15,105; Referee: Deniz Aytekin

29 August 2021 3	Union Berlin	2–1	Borussia Mönchengladbach	Berlin
15:30 CEST (UTC+2)	Gießelmann 22'; Awoniyi 41'; Haraguchi (yellow card) 45'; Trimmel (yellow card) 52'	Report	Hofmann 90+1'	Stadium: Stadion An der Alten Försterei; Attendance: 11,006; Referee: Felix Brych

12 September 2021 4	Borussia Mönchengladbach	3–1	Arminia Bielefeld	Mönchengladbach
19:30 CEST (UTC+2)	Stindl 35', 69'; Scally (yellow card) 68'; Zakaria 72'	Report	Okugawa 45+2'; Hack (yellow card) 75'	Stadium: Borussia-Park; Attendance: 24,500; Referee: Sascha Stegemann

18 September 2021 5	FC Augsburg	1–0	Borussia Mönchengladbach	Augsburg
15:30 CEST (UTC+2)	Hahn (yellow card) 31'; Niederlechner 80'	Report	Beyer (yellow card) 41'; Zakaria (yellow card) 90+3'	Stadium: WWK Arena; Attendance: 12,500; Referee: Florian Badstübner

25 September 2021 6	Borussia Mönchengladbach	1–0	Borussia Dortmund	Mönchengladbach
18:30 CEST (UTC+2)	Zakaria (yellow card) 13', (goal) 37'; Stindl (yellow card) 33'; Netz (yellow card) 45+2'; Koné (yellow card) 59'	Report	Dahoud (yellow card) 10' (yellow-red card) 40'; Pongračić (yellow card) 35'; Bellingham (yellow card) 85'	Stadium: Borussia-Park; Attendance: 25,000; Referee: Deniz Aytekin

2 October 2021 7	VfL Wolfsburg	1–3	Borussia Mönchengladbach	Wolfsburg
15:30 CEST (UTC+2)	Bornauw (yellow card) 4'; Baku (yellow card) 10'; Waldschmidt 25'; Mbabu (yellow card) 59'; Lacroix (yellow card) 67' (yellow-red card) 76'; Weghorst (yellow card) 81'; Roussillon (yellow card) 90+3'	Report	Embolo 5'; Hofmann 7'; Stindl (yellow card) 35', (penalty missed) 76'; Zakaria (yellow card) 36'; Beyer (yellow card) 71'; Scally 90+5'	Stadium: Volkswagen Arena; Attendance: 12,845; Referee: Frank Willenborg

16 October 2021 8	Borussia Mönchengladbach	1–1	VfB Stuttgart	Mönchengladbach
18:30 CEST (UTC+2)	Hofmann 43'; Koné (yellow card) 63'; Herrmann (yellow card) 80'; Bennetts (yellow card) 82'	Report	Mavropanos 15'; Karazor (yellow card) 45+1'; Führich (yellow card) 64'; Kempf (yellow card) 88'	Stadium: Borussia-Park; Attendance: 41,608; Referee: Felix Brych

23 October 2021 9	Hertha BSC	1–0	Borussia Mönchengladbach	Berlin
18:30 CEST (UTC+2)	Richter 40'; Darida (yellow card) 54'; Ascacíbar (yellow card) 90+4'	Report	Beyer (yellow card) 2'; Scally (yellow card) 77'	Stadium: Olympiastadion; Attendance: 25,000; Referee: Benjamin Cortus

31 October 2021 10	Borussia Mönchengladbach	2–1	VfL Bochum	Mönchengladbach
17:30 CET (UTC+1)	Pléa 12'; Hofmann 40'; Wolf (yellow card) 85'	Report	Mašović (yellow card) 51'; Blum 86'	Stadium: Borussia-Park; Attendance: 42,361; Referee: Tobias Reichel

5 November 2021 11	Mainz 05	1–1	Borussia Mönchengladbach	Mainz
20:30 CET (UTC+1)	Lee (yellow card) 31'; Bell (yellow card) 45'; Boëtius (yellow card) 53'; Widmer 76'	Report	Elvedi (yellow card) 22'; Neuhaus 38'; Koné (yellow card) 64'; Bensebaini (yellow card) 70'	Stadium: Opel Arena; Attendance: 25,000; Referee: Robert Schröder

20 November 2021 12	Borussia Mönchengladbach	4–0	Greuther Fürth	Mönchengladbach
15:30 CET (UTC+1)	Hofmann 10', 57'; Neuhaus 28'; Pléa 43'; Stindl (yellow card) 55'	Report	Seguin (yellow card) 45+2'; Leweling (yellow card) 78'; Christiansen (yellow card) 89'	Stadium: Borussia-Park; Attendance: 38,621; Referee: Benjamin Brand

27 November 2021 13	1. FC Köln	4–1	Borussia Mönchengladbach	Cologne
15:30 CET (UTC+1)	Ljubicic 55'; Duda (yellow card) 60', (goal) 78'; Uth 77'; Andersson 90+3'	Report	Sommer (yellow card) 60'; Zakaria (yellow card) 64'; Hofmann 74'; Thuram (yellow card) 90'	Stadium: RheinEnergieStadion; Attendance: 50,000; Referee: Robert Schröder

5 December 2021 14	Borussia Mönchengladbach	0–6	SC Freiburg	Mönchengladbach
17:30 CET (UTC+1)	Bensebaini (yellow card) 15'; Koné (yellow card) 24'	Report	Eggestein 2'; Schade 5'; Lienhart 12'; Höfler 19'; Höler 25'; Schlotterbeck 37'; Demirović (yellow card) 44'	Stadium: Borussia-Park; Attendance: 10,025; Referee: Robert Hartmann

11 December 2021 15	RB Leipzig	4–1	Borussia Mönchengladbach	Leipzig
15:30 CET (UTC+1)	Gvardiol 21', (yellow card) 81'; Silva 32'; Orbán (yellow card) 59'; Simakan (yellow card) 89'; Nkunku 90+1'; Henrichs 90+4'	Report	Embolo (yellow card) 41'; Stindl (yellow card) 42'; Bensebaini 88'	Stadium: Red Bull Arena; Attendance: 0 Referee: Bastian Dankert

15 December 2021 16	Borussia Mönchengladbach	2–3	Eintracht Frankfurt	Mönchengladbach
18:30 CET (UTC+1)	Neuhaus 6'; Embolo (yellow card) 43'; Bensebaini 54' (pen.); Koné (yellow card) 62'	Report	Tuta (yellow card) 39' (yellow-red card) 70'; Borré (yellow card) 43', (goal) 45'; Lindstrøm 50'; Kamada 55'; Da Costa (yellow card) 72'; Lenz (yellow card) 90+3'	Stadium: Borussia-Park; Attendance: 10,028; Referee: Martin Petersen

18 December 2021 17	1899 Hoffenheim	1–1	Borussia Mönchengladbach	Sinsheim
15:30 CET (UTC+1)	Kadeřábek (yellow card) 55'; Akpoguma 90+1'; Geiger (yellow card) 90+4'	Report	Embolo 35'; Bensebaini (yellow card) 62'; Lainer (yellow card) 90+4'	Stadium: Rhein-Neckar-Arena; Attendance: 750; Referee: Sven Jablonski

7 January 2022 18	Bayern Munich	1–2	Borussia Mönchengladbach	Munich
20:30 CET (UTC+1)	Lewandowski 18'	Report	Neuhaus 27'; Lainer 31'; Stindl (yellow card) 78'	Stadium: Allianz Arena; Attendance: 0 Referee: Daniel Siebert

15 January 2022 19	Borussia Mönchengladbach	1–2	Bayer Leverkusen	Mönchengladbach
18:30 CET (UTC+1)	Stindl (yellow card) 45+1'; Elvedi 81'; Beyer (yellow card) 84'	Report	Tah (yellow card) 28'; Bakker (yellow card) 36'; Schick (penalty missed) 50', 74'; Andrich 51'; Demirbay (penalty missed) 88', (yellow card) 90+4'	Stadium: Borussia-Park; Attendance: 750; Referee: Sascha Stegemann

22 January 2022 20	Borussia Mönchengladbach	1–2	Union Berlin	Mönchengladbach
15:30 CET (UTC+1)	Friedrich (yellow card) 28'; Koné 40'	Report	Prömel (yellow card) 3'; Kruse 18' (pen.), 84'; Knoche (yellow card) 66'	Stadium: Borussia-Park; Attendance: 750; Referee: Felix Brych

5 February 2022 21	Arminia Bielefeld	1–1	Borussia Mönchengladbach	Bielefeld
15:30 CET (UTC+1)	Serra 19'; Kunze (yellow card) 58'; Wimmer (yellow card) 64'; Nilsson (yellow card) 74'	Report	Koné (yellow card) 28'; Pléa 38', (yellow card) 90+3'; Lainer (yellow card) 82'	Stadium: Bielefelder Alm; Attendance: 10,000; Referee: Benjamin Cortus

12 February 2022 22	Borussia Mönchengladbach	3–2	FC Augsburg	Mönchengladbach
15:30 CET (UTC+1)	Pléa (yellow card) 9'; Koné 30'; Hofmann 46'; Bensebaini 67'; Elvedi (yellow card) 84'	Report	Iago 55', (yellow card) 59'; Dorsch (yellow card) 90'; Finnbogason 90+3'	Stadium: Borussia-Park; Attendance: 10,000; Referee: Tobias Welz

20 February 2022 23	Borussia Dortmund	6–0	Borussia Mönchengladbach	Dortmund
17:30 CET (UTC+1)	Zagadou (yellow card) 12'; Reus 26', 81'; Malen 32'; Dahoud (yellow card) 35'; Wolf 70'; Moukoko 74'; Can 90+1' (pen.)	Report	Bensebaini (yellow card) 14'	Stadium: Signal Iduna Park; Attendance: 10,000; Referee: Marco Fritz

26 February 2022 24	Borussia Mönchengladbach	2–2	VfL Wolfsburg	Mönchengladbach
15:30 CET (UTC+1)	Sommer (yellow card) 34'; Thuram 42'; Beyer (yellow card) 65'; Embolo 82'	Report	Wind 6'; Bornauw 33'; Philipp (yellow card) 37'; Baku (yellow card) 37'; Lacroix (red card) 70'; Casteels (yellow card) 76'; Gerhardt (yellow card) 90+3'	Stadium: Borussia-Park; Attendance: 10,000; Referee: Tobias Reichel

5 March 2022 25	VfB Stuttgart	3–2	Borussia Mönchengladbach	Stuttgart
18:30 CET (UTC+1)	Endo 38'; Führich 51'; Anton (yellow card) 54'; Kalajdžić 83'	Report	Pléa 14'; Bensebaini (yellow card) 27'; Thuram 35'; Scally (yellow card) 81'	Stadium: Mercedes-Benz Arena; Attendance: 25,000; Referee: Christian Dingert

12 March 2022 26	Borussia Mönchengladbach	2–0	Hertha BSC	Mönchengladbach
18:30 CET (UTC+1)	Pléa 24' (pen.); Ginter (yellow card) 56', (goal) 59'; Scally (yellow card) 81'; Thuram (yellow card) 89'	Report		Stadium: Borussia-Park; Attendance: 30,675; Referee: Florian Badstübner

18 March 2022 27	VfL Bochum	0–2	Borussia Mönchengladbach	Bochum
20:30 CET (UTC+1)	Mašović (yellow card) 29'; Bella-Kotchap (yellow card) 32'	Report	Koné (yellow card) 8'; Pléa 55'; Embolo 61'	Stadium: Vonovia Ruhrstadion; Attendance: 25,000; Referee: Benjamin Cortus
Note: The match was abandoned after 69 minutes and a score of 0–2 after an assistant referee was hit by a beer cup. On 24 March, the DFB Sports Court awarded the match as a 2–0 win for Borussia Mönchengladbach.

3 April 2022 28	Borussia Mönchengladbach	1–1	Mainz 05	Mönchengladbach
17:30 CEST (UTC+2)	Embolo (yellow card) 10', (goal) 33'; Ginter (yellow card) 28'	Report	Barreiro (yellow card) 40'; Onisiwo 73'	Stadium: Borussia-Park; Attendance: 44,156; Referee: Daniel Schlager

9 April 2022 29	Greuther Fürth	0–2	Borussia Mönchengladbach	Fürth
15:30 CEST (UTC+2)	Tillman (yellow card) 24'	Report	Thuram 18'; Pléa 24' (pen.)	Stadium: Sportpark Ronhof; Attendance: 13,900; Referee: Tobias Stieler

16 April 2022 30	Borussia Mönchengladbach	1–3	1. FC Köln	Mönchengladbach
18:30 CEST (UTC+2)	Koné (yellow card) 45'; Pléa (yellow card) 65'; Embolo 85'; Elvedi (yellow card) 86'	Report	Modeste 5'; Kainz 20'; Ljubičić 34'; Hector (yellow card) 69'; Hübers (yellow card) 72'	Stadium: Borussia-Park; Attendance: 54,042; Referee: Deniz Aytekin

23 April 2022 31	SC Freiburg	3–3	Borussia Mönchengladbach	Freiburg
15:30 CEST (UTC+2)	Grifo 49' (pen.); Günter 61'; Eggestein (yellow card) 73'; Lienhart 80'	Report	Bensebaini 3' (pen.), (yellow card) 88'; Embolo 13'; Pléa (yellow card) 59'; Koné (yellow card) 65'; Stindl (yellow card) 79', (goal) 90+3'	Stadium: Europa-Park Stadion; Attendance: 34,700; Referee: Benjamin Brand

2 May 2022 32	Borussia Mönchengladbach	3–1	RB Leipzig	Mönchengladbach
20:30 CEST (UTC+2)	Embolo 17'; Stindl (yellow card) 23'; Hofmann 45+2', 77', (yellow card) 90+2'; Elvedi (red card) 64'; Koné (yellow card) 88'; Neuhaus (yellow card) 90+1'	Report	Gvardiol (yellow card) 10'; Simakan (yellow card) 22'; Nkunku 36'	Stadium: Borussia-Park; Attendance: 35,324; Referee: Martin Petersen

8 May 2022 33	Eintracht Frankfurt	1–1	Borussia Mönchengladbach	Frankfurt
15:30 CEST (UTC+2)	Ilsanker (yellow card) 56'; Paciência 66'	Report	Pléa 4'	Stadium: Deutsche Bank Park; Attendance: 51,500; Referee: Felix Zwayer

14 May 2022 34	Borussia Mönchengladbach	5–1	1899 Hoffenheim	Mönchengladbach
15:30 CEST (UTC+2)	Stindl (yellow card) 10', (goal) 26'; Pléa 44' (pen.); Hofmann 45+1', 68'; Embolo 53'	Report	Kramarić 3'; Samassékou (yellow card) 31'; Vogt (yellow card) 60'	Stadium: Borussia-Park; Attendance: 50,395; Referee: Harm Osmers

=== DFB-Pokal ===
9 August 2021 First round	1. FC Kaiserslautern	0–1	Borussia Mönchengladbach	Kaiserslautern
20:45 CEST (UTC+2)	Klingenburg (yellow card) 20'; Tomiak (yellow card) 66'; Niehues (yellow card) 72'; Kleinsorge (yellow card) 75'	Report	Stindl 11', (yellow card) 20'; Scally (yellow card) 77'	Stadium: Fritz-Walter-Stadion; Attendance: 5,000; Referee: Harm Osmers

27 October 2021 Second round	Borussia Mönchengladbach	5–0	Bayern Munich	Mönchengladbach
20:45 CEST (UTC+2)	Koné 2'; Bensebaini 15', 21' (pen.); Embolo 51', 58'; Zakaria (yellow card) 79'	Report	Upamecano (yellow card) 46'	Stadium: Borussia-Park; Attendance: 48,500; Referee: Tobias Stieler

19 January 2022 Round of 16	Hannover 96	3–0	Borussia Mönchengladbach	Hanover
18:30 CET (UTC+1)	Beier 4', 51'; Kerk 36' (pen.)	Report	Friedrich (yellow card) 36'; Embolo (yellow card) 75'	Stadium: HDI-Arena; Attendance: 500; Referee: Florian Badstübner

== Statistics ==
=== Appearances and goals ===
No.	Pos	Nat	Player	Total		Bundesliga		DFB-Pokal	
No.	Pos	Nat	Player	Apps	Goals	Apps	Goals	Apps	Goals
Goalkeepers
1	GK	(Switzerland) SUI	Yann Sommer	36	0	33	0	3	0
21	GK	(Germany) GER	Tobias Sippel	1	0	1	0	0	0
41	GK	(Germany) GER	Jan Olschowsky	0	0	0	0	0	0
46	GK	(Germany) GER	Jonas Kersken	0	0	0	0	0	0
Defenders
4	DF	(France) FRA	Mamadou Doucouré	0	0	0	0	0	0
5	DF	(Germany) GER	Marvin Friedrich	9	0	7+1	0	1	0
15	DF	(Germany) GER	Jordan Beyer	18	0	15+2	0	1	0
17	DF	(France) FRA	Kouadio Koné	29	3	26+1	2	2	1
18	DF	(Austria) AUT	Stefan Lainer	23	1	19+2	1	2	0
20	DF	(Germany) GER	Luca Netz	26	0	17+7	0	0+2	0
24	DF	(Germany) GER	Tony Jantschke	3	0	3	0	0	0
25	DF	(Algeria) ALG	Ramy Bensebaini	24	6	22+1	4	1	2
28	DF	(Germany) GER	Matthias Ginter	31	1	27+1	1	3	0
29	DF	(United States) USA	Joe Scally	33	1	20+10	1	3	0
30	DF	(Switzerland) SUI	Nico Elvedi	31	1	28	1	3	0
Midfielders
6	MF	(Germany) GER	Christoph Kramer	19	0	7+11	0	1	0
13	MF	(Germany) GER	Lars Stindl	29	5	19+7	4	3	1
22	MF	(Slovakia) SVK	László Bénes	14	0	2+11	0	1	0
23	MF	(Germany) GER	Jonas Hofmann	28	12	24+2	12	1+1	0
32	MF	(Germany) GER	Florian Neuhaus	31	4	23+5	4	2+1	0
34	MF	(Republic of Ireland) IRL	Conor Noß	3	0	0+3	0	0	0
Forwards
7	FW	(Germany) GER	Patrick Herrmann	26	0	5+18	0	1+2	0
10	FW	(France) FRA	Marcus Thuram	23	3	9+12	3	1+1	0
14	FW	(France) FRA	Alassane Pléa	36	10	24+9	10	1+2	0
36	FW	(Switzerland) SUI	Breel Embolo	31	11	24+5	9	1+1	2
37	MF	(England) ENG	Keanan Bennetts	5	0	0+4	0	0+1	0
Players transferred out during the season
8	MF	(Switzerland) SUI	Denis Zakaria	18	2	15+1	2	1+1	0
11	MF	(Austria) AUT	Hannes Wolf	8	0	2+5	0	1	0
26	MF	(Germany) GER	Torben Müsel	1	0	0+1	0	0	0
27	MF	(Portugal) POR	Famana Quizera	0	0	0	0	0	0
40	DF	(Denmark) DEN	Andreas Poulsen	0	0	0	0	0	0

Last updated: 14 May 2022
Source: Competitions

=== Goalscorers ===
Rank	Pos.	No.	Nat.	Player	Bundesliga	DFB-Pokal	Total
1	MF	23	(Germany)	Jonas Hofmann	12	0	12
2	FW	36	(Switzerland)	Breel Embolo	9	2	11
3	FW	14	(France)	Alassane Pléa	10	0	10
4	DF	25	(Algeria)	Ramy Bensebaini	4	2	6
5	MF	13	(Germany)	Lars Stindl	4	1	5
6	MF	32	(Germany)	Florian Neuhaus	4	0	4
7	FW	10	(France)	Marcus Thuram	3	0	3
7	DF	17	(France)	Kouadio Koné	2	1	3
9	MF	8	(Switzerland)	Denis Zakaria	2	0	2
10	DF	18	(Austria)	Stefan Lainer	1	0	1
10	DF	28	(Germany)	Matthias Ginter	1	0	1
10	DF	29	(United States)	Joe Scally	1	0	1
10	DF	30	(Switzerland)	Nico Elvedi	1	0	1
Totals					54	6	60
