= 2018–19 Borussia Mönchengladbach season =

Borussia Mönchengladbach
2018–19 season
- President: Rolf Königs
- Manager: Dieter Hecking
- Stadium: Borussia-Park
- Bundesliga: 5th
- DFB-Pokal: Second round
- Top goalscorer: League: Alassane Pléa (12 goals); All: Alassane Pléa (15 goals)
- Biggest win: Hastedt 1–11 Gladbach
- Biggest defeat: Gladbach 0–5 Leverkusen
Home colours	Away colours	Third colours

The 2018–19 Borussia Mönchengladbach season was the 119th season in the football club's history and 11th consecutive and 51st overall season in the top flight of German football, the Bundesliga, having been promoted from the 2. Bundesliga in 2008. In addition to the domestic league, Borussia Mönchengladbach also participated in this season's edition of the domestic cup, the DFB-Pokal. This was the 15th season for Mönchengladbach in the Borussia-Park, located in Mönchengladbach, North Rhine-Westphalia, Germany. The season covered a period from 1 July 2018 to 30 June 2019.

== Players ==
=== Squad information ===
As of 29 January 2019

Note: Flags indicate national team as defined under FIFA eligibility rules; some limited exceptions apply. Players may hold more than one non-FIFA nationality.

No.	Pos.	Nation	Player
1	GK	SUI	Yann Sommer (vice-captain)
2	DF	ENG	Mandela Egbo
3	DF	SUI	Michael Lang
5	MF	GER	Tobias Strobl
6	MF	GER	Christoph Kramer
7	MF	GER	Patrick Herrmann
8	MF	SUI	Denis Zakaria
10	FW	BEL	Thorgan Hazard
11	FW	BRA	Raffael
13	FW	GER	Lars Stindl (captain)
14	FW	FRA	Alassane Pléa
15	DF	GER	Jordan Beyer
16	MF	GUI	Ibrahima Traoré
17	DF	SWE	Oscar Wendt (3rd captain)
18	FW	SUI	Josip Drmić
19	MF	USA	Fabian Johnson

No.	Pos.	Nation	Player
20	FW	PAR	Julio Villalba
21	GK	GER	Tobias Sippel
23	MF	GER	Jonas Hofmann
24	DF	GER	Tony Jantschke
26	FW	GER	Torben Müsel
27	MF	FRA	Mickaël Cuisance
28	DF	GER	Matthias Ginter
29	DF	FRA	Mamadou Doucouré
30	DF	SUI	Nico Elvedi
32	MF	GER	Florian Neuhaus
35	GK	GER	Moritz Nicolas
37	MF	ENG	Keanan Bennetts
38	DF	GER	Marcel Benger
40	DF	DEN	Andreas Poulsen
42	DF	GER	Florian Mayer

=== Loans ===
Note: Flags indicate national team as defined under FIFA eligibility rules; some limited exceptions apply. Players may hold more than one non-FIFA nationality.

No.	Pos.	Nation	Player
—	MF	SVK	László Bénes (on loan to Holstein Kiel until 30 June 2019)

=== Transfers ===
==== In ====
No.	Pos	Player	From	Type	Window	Ends	Fee	Source
3	DF	(Switzerland) Michael Lang	(Switzerland) FC Basel	Transfer	Summer	2022	€2,800,000	
14	FW	(France) Alassane Pléa	(France) Nice	Transfer	Summer	2023	€23,000,000	
32	MF	(Germany) Florian Neuhaus	Fortuna Düsseldorf	Loan return	Summer	2022	Free	
37	MF	(England) Keanan Bennetts	(England) Tottenham Hotspur U23	Transfer	Summer	2022	€2,250,000	
40	MF	(Denmark) Andreas Poulsen	(Denmark) FC Midtjylland	Transfer	Summer	2022	€4,500,000	
42	DF	(Germany) Florian Mayer	Borussia Mönchengladbach II	Promoted	Summer	2019	Free	
–	DF	(Germany) Jordan Beyer	Borussia Mönchengladbach U19	Promoted	Summer		Free	
–	GK	(Germany) Janis Blaswich	Hansa Rostock	Loan return	Summer	2019	Free	
–	MF	(Germany) Tsiy William Ndenge	(Netherlands) Roda JC	Loan return	Summer	2019	Free	
–	FW	(Australia) Kwame Yeboah	SC Paderborn	Loan return	Summer	2019	Free	

==== Out ====
No.	Pos	Player	To	Type	Window	Fee	Source
3	DF	(England) Reece Oxford	(England) West Ham	Loan return	Summer	Free	
4	DF	(Denmark) Jannik Vestergaard	(England) Southampton	Transfer	Summer	€25,000,000	
26	FW	(Paraguay) Raúl Bobadilla	(Argentina) Argentinos Juniors	Transfer	Summer	€1,800,000	
32	FW	(Italy) Vincenzo Grifo	1899 Hoffenheim	Transfer	Summer	€5,500,000	
33	GK	(Germany) Christofer Heimeroth		Retired	Summer		
44	FW	(Germany) Ba-Muaka Simakala	Borussia Mönchengladbach II	Transfer	Summer	Free	
–	GK	(Germany) Janis Blaswich	(Netherlands) Heracles Almelo	Transfer	Summer	Undisclosed	
—	MF	(Germany) Tsiy William Ndenge	Borussia Mönchengladbach II	Transfer	Summer	Free	
—	FW	(Australia) Kwame Yeboah	SC Fortuna Köln	Transfer	Summer	Undisclosed	

== Competitions ==
Win Draw Loss

=== Overview ===
Competition	First match	Last match	Starting round	Final position	Record							
Competition	First match	Last match	Starting round	Final position	Pld	W	D	L	GF	GA	GD	Win %
Bundesliga	25 August 2018	18 May 2019	Matchday 1	5th	34	16	7	11	55	42	+13	47.06
DFB-Pokal	19 August 2018	31 October 2018	First round	Second round	2	1	0	1	11	6	+5	50.00
Total					36	17	7	12	66	48	+18	47.22

Last updated: 25 May 2019
Source: Competitions

=== Bundesliga ===
==== League table ====
Pos	Team	Pld	W	D	L	GF	GA	GD	Pts	Qualification or relegation
3	RB Leipzig	34	19	9	6	63	29	+34	66	Qualification for the Champions League group stage
4	Bayer Leverkusen	34	18	4	12	69	52	+17	58	Qualification for the Champions League group stage
5	Borussia Mönchengladbach	34	16	7	11	55	42	+13	55	Qualification for the Europa League group stage (Note: Since the winners of the 2018–19 DFB-Pokal, Bayern Munich, qualified for the Champions League based on league position, the Europa League group stage spot was passed to the sixth-placed team, and the Europa League second qualifying round spot was passed to the seventh-placed team.)
6	VfL Wolfsburg	34	16	7	11	62	50	+12	55	Qualification for the Europa League group stage
7	Eintracht Frankfurt	34	15	9	10	60	48	+12	54	Qualification for the Europa League second qualifying round

Source: DFB
Rules for classification: 1) Points; 2) Goal difference; 3) Goals scored; 4) Head-to-head results; 5) Head-to-head away goals scored; 6) Away goals scored; 7) Play-off

==== Results summary ====
Overall								Home						Away					
Pld	W	D	L	GF	GA	GD	Pts	W	D	L	GF	GA	GD	W	D	L	GF	GA	GD
34	16	7	11	55	42	+13	55	9	3	5	31	22	+9	7	4	6	24	20	+4

Last updated: 25 May 2019.
Source: Bundesliga

==== Results by round ====
Round	1	2	3	4	5	6	7	8	9	10	11	12	13	14	15	16	17	18	19	20	21	22	23	24	25	26	27	28	29	30	31	32	33	34
Ground	H	A	H	A	H	A	A	H	A	H	A	H	A	H	A	H	A	A	H	A	H	A	H	H	A	H	A	H	A	H	A	H	A	H
Result	W	D	W	L	W	D	W	W	L	W	W	W	L	W	D	W	L	W	W	W	L	D	L	L	W	D	L	D	W	L	L	D	W	L
Position	3	5	4	6	4	4	3	2	3	2	2	2	2	2	2	2	3	3	3	2	3	3	3	4	4	4	5	5	5	5	5	6	4	5

Updated to match(es) played on 25 May 2019. Source: DFB
A = Away; H = Home; W = Win; D = Draw; L = Loss

==== Matches ====
25 August 2018 1	Borussia Mönchengladbach	2–0	Bayer Leverkusen	Mönchengladbach
18:30 CEST (UTC+2)	Hofmann 55' (pen.); Johnson 58'	Report		Stadium: Borussia-Park; Attendance: 53,087; Referee: Christian Dingert

1 September 2018 2	FC Augsburg	1–1	Borussia Mönchengladbach	Augsburg
15:30 CEST (UTC+2)	Gregoritsch 12'	Report	Pléa 68'	Stadium: WWK Arena; Attendance: 29,500; Referee: Frank Willenborg

15 September 2018 3	Borussia Mönchengladbach	2–1	Schalke 04	Mönchengladbach
18:30 CEST (UTC+2)	Ginter 3'; Herrmann 76'	Report	Embolo 90+3'	Stadium: Borussia-Park; Attendance: 54,022; Referee: Manuel Gräfe

22 September 2018 4	Hertha BSC	4–2	Borussia Mönchengladbach	Berlin
15:30 CEST (UTC+2)	Ibišević 31', 63'; Lazaro 34'; Duda 73'	Report	Hazard 29' (pen.); Pléa 67'	Stadium: Olympiastadion Berlin; Attendance: 51,852; Referee: Markus Schmidt

26 September 2018 5	Borussia Mönchengladbach	3–1	Eintracht Frankfurt	Mönchengladbach
20:30 CEST (UTC+2)	Pléa 56'; Hazard 65'; Elvedi 85'	Report	Rebić 74'	Stadium: Borussia-Park; Attendance: 41,257; Referee: Sven Jablonski

29 September 2018 6	VfL Wolfsburg	2–2	Borussia Mönchengladbach	Wolfsburg
15:30 CEST (UTC+2)	Steffen 12'; Weghorst 59'	Report	Pléa 7'; Hazard 48'	Stadium: Volkswagen Arena; Attendance: 24,100; Referee: Felix Zwayer

6 October 2018 7	Bayern Munich	0–3	Borussia Mönchengladbach	Munich
18:30 CEST (UTC+2)		Report	Pléa 10'; Stindl 16'; Herrmann 88'	Stadium: Allianz Arena; Attendance: 75,000; Referee: Frank Willenborg

21 October 2018 8	Borussia Mönchengladbach	4–0	Mainz 05	Mönchengladbach
18:00 CEST (UTC+2)	Hofmann 21', 53', 63'; Hazard 58'	Report		Stadium: Borussia-Park; Attendance: 51,123; Referee: Sören Storks

26 October 2018 9	SC Freiburg	3–1	Borussia Mönchengladbach	Freiburg
20:30 CEST (UTC+2)	Petersen 1' (pen.); Waldschmidt 57'; Höler 90+4'	Report	Hazard 20' (pen.)	Stadium: Schwarzwald-Stadion; Attendance: 24,000; Referee: Robert Hartmann

4 November 2018 10	Borussia Mönchengladbach	3–0	Fortuna Düsseldorf	Mönchengladbach
15:30 CET (UTC+1)	Hazard 48' (pen.), 82'; Hofmann 67'	Report		Stadium: Borussia-Park; Attendance: 54,022; Referee: Felix Brych

10 November 2018 11	Werder Bremen	1–3	Borussia Mönchengladbach	Bremen
15:30 CET (UTC+1)	Şahin 59'	Report	Pléa 39', 48', 52'	Stadium: Weser-Stadion; Attendance: 42,100; Referee: Sören Storks

25 November 2018 12	Borussia Mönchengladbach	4–1	Hannover 96	Mönchengladbach
18:00 CET (UTC+1)	Hazard 7'; Lang 44'; Stindl 58'; Zakaria 77'	Report	Wood 1'	Stadium: Borussia-Park; Attendance: 48,692; Referee: Daniel Siebert

2 December 2018 13	RB Leipzig	2–0	Borussia Mönchengladbach	Leipzig
15:30 CET (UTC+1)	Werner 3', 45+1'	Report		Stadium: Red Bull Arena; Attendance: 41,939; Referee: Markus Schmidt

9 December 2018 14	Borussia Mönchengladbach	3–0	VfB Stuttgart	Mönchengladbach
18:00 CET (UTC+1)	Raffael 69'; Neuhaus 77'; Pavard 84' (o.g.)	Report		Stadium: Borussia-Park; Attendance: 48,590; Referee: Deniz Aytekin

15 December 2018 15	1899 Hoffenheim	0–0	Borussia Mönchengladbach	Sinsheim
15:30 CET (UTC+1)		Report		Stadium: Wirsol Rhein-Neckar-Arena; Attendance: 30,150; Referee: Benjamin Cortus

18 December 2018 16	Borussia Mönchengladbach	2–0	1. FC Nürnberg	Mönchengladbach
18:30 CET (UTC+1)	Hazard 47'; Pléa 86'	Report		Stadium: Borussia-Park; Attendance: 42,323; Referee: Robert Schröder

21 December 2018 17	Borussia Dortmund	2–1	Borussia Mönchengladbach	Dortmund
20:30 CET (UTC+1)	Sancho 42'; Reus 54'	Report	Kramer 45+1'	Stadium: Signal Iduna Park; Attendance: 81,365; Referee: Felix Zwayer

19 January 2019 18	Bayer Leverkusen	0–1	Borussia Mönchengladbach	Leverkusen
15:30 CET (UTC+1)		Report	Pléa 37'	Stadium: BayArena; Attendance: 29,628; Referee: Daniel Siebert

26 January 2019 19	Borussia Mönchengladbach	2–0	FC Augsburg	Mönchengladbach
15:30 CET (UTC+1)	Wendt 78'; Herrmann 90+3'	Report		Stadium: Borussia-Park; Attendance: 42,509; Referee: Harm Osmers

2 February 2019 20	Schalke 04	0–2	Borussia Mönchengladbach	Gelsenkirchen
18:30 CET (UTC+1)		Report	Kramer 85'; Neuhaus 90+1'	Stadium: Veltins-Arena; Attendance: 62,271; Referee: Marco Fritz

9 February 2019 21	Borussia Mönchengladbach	0–3	Hertha BSC	Mönchengladbach
15:30 CET (UTC+1)		Report	Kalou 30'; Duda 56', 76'	Stadium: Borussia-Park; Attendance: 48,232; Referee: Martin Petersen

17 February 2019 22	Eintracht Frankfurt	1–1	Borussia Mönchengladbach	Frankfurt
15:30 CET (UTC+1)	Da Costa 45+1'	Report	Zakaria 82'	Stadium: Commerzbank-Arena; Attendance: 51,500; Referee: Deniz Aytekin

23 February 2019 23	Borussia Mönchengladbach	0–3	VfL Wolfsburg	Mönchengladbach
15:30 CET (UTC+1)		Report	Gerhardt 38'; Mehmedi 68', 83'	Stadium: Borussia-Park; Attendance: 48,041; Referee: Robert Kampka

2 March 2019 24	Borussia Mönchengladbach	1–5	Bayern Munich	Mönchengladbach
18:30 CET (UTC+1)	Stindl 37'	Report	Martínez 2'; Müller 11'; Lewandowski 47', 90+1' (pen.); Gnabry 75'	Stadium: Borussia-Park; Attendance: 54,022; Referee: Felix Zwayer

9 March 2019 25	Mainz 05	0–1	Borussia Mönchengladbach	Mainz
18:30 CET (UTC+1)		Report	Elvedi 63'	Stadium: Opel Arena; Attendance: 30,405; Referee: Markus Schmidt

15 March 2019 26	Borussia Mönchengladbach	1–1	SC Freiburg	Mönchengladbach
20:30 CET (UTC+1)	Pléa 16'	Report	Grifo 10'	Stadium: Borussia-Park; Attendance: 46,832; Referee: Robert Kampka

30 March 2019 27	Fortuna Düsseldorf	3–1	Borussia Mönchengladbach	Düsseldorf
15:30 CET (UTC+1)	Hennings 6', 16'; Stöger 12'	Report	Zakaria 83'	Stadium: Merkur Spiel-Arena; Attendance: 52,500; Referee: Tobias Stieler

7 April 2019 28	Borussia Mönchengladbach	1–1	Werder Bremen	Mönchengladbach
18:00 CEST (UTC+2)	Neuhaus 49'	Report	Klaassen 79'	Stadium: Borussia-Park; Attendance: 54,022; Referee: Daniel Schlager

13 April 2019 29	Hannover 96	0–1	Borussia Mönchengladbach	Hanover
15:30 CEST (UTC+2)		Report	Raffael 53'	Stadium: HDI-Arena; Attendance: 40,200; Referee: Felix Brych

20 April 2019 30	Borussia Mönchengladbach	1–2	RB Leipzig	Mönchengladbach
18:30 CEST (UTC+2)	Pléa 61'	Report	Halstenberg 17' (pen.), 53'	Stadium: Borussia-Park; Attendance: 51,757; Referee: Harm Osmers

27 April 2019 31	VfB Stuttgart	1–0	Borussia Mönchengladbach	Stuttgart
18:30 CEST (UTC+2)	Donis 56'	Report		Stadium: Mercedes-Benz Arena; Attendance: 56,730; Referee: Bastian Dankert

4 May 2019 32	Borussia Mönchengladbach	2–2	1899 Hoffenheim	Mönchengladbach
15:30 CEST (UTC+2)	Ginter 72'; Drmić 84'	Report	Kadeřábek 33'; Amiri 79'	Stadium: Borussia-Park; Attendance: 51,807; Referee: Sascha Stegemann

11 May 2019 33	1. FC Nürnberg	0–4	Borussia Mönchengladbach	Nuremberg
15:30 CEST (UTC+2)		Report	Drmić 56'; Mühl 63' (o.g.); Hazard 65'; Zakaria 80'	Stadium: Max-Morlock-Stadion; Attendance: 50,000; Referee: Frank Willenborg

18 May 2019 34	Borussia Mönchengladbach	0–2	Borussia Dortmund	Mönchengladbach
15:30 CEST (UTC+2)		Report	Sancho 45'; Reus 54'	Stadium: Borussia-Park; Attendance: 54,022; Referee: Manuel Gräfe

=== DFB-Pokal ===
19 August 2018 First round	BSC Hastedt	1–11	Borussia Mönchengladbach	Bremen
18:30 CEST (UTC+2)	Kücük 88'	Report	Hazard 2' (pen.), 42', 84'; Pléa 8', 50', 78'; Raffael 15', 30', 66'; Neuhaus 39'; Hofmann 56'	Stadium: Weserstadion Platz 11; Attendance: 4,997; Referee: Christof Günsch

31 October 2018 Second round	Borussia Mönchengladbach	0–5	Bayer Leverkusen	Mönchengladbach
20:45 CET (UTC+1)		Report	Brandt 5'; Jedvaj 45+1'; Bellarabi 67', 74'; Volland 80'	Stadium: Borussia-Park; Attendance: 48,755; Referee: Tobias Welz

== Statistics ==
=== Appearances and goals ===
No.	Pos	Nat	Player	Total		Bundesliga		DFB-Pokal	
No.	Pos	Nat	Player	Apps	Goals	Apps	Goals	Apps	Goals
Goalkeepers
1	GK	(Switzerland) SUI	Yann Sommer	35	0	34	0	1	0
21	GK	(Germany) GER	Tobias Sippel	1	0	0	0	1	0
35	GK	(Germany) GER	Moritz Nicolas	0	0	0	0	0	0
Defenders
2	DF	(England) ENG	Mandela Egbo	0	0	0	0	0	0
3	DF	(Switzerland) SUI	Michael Lang	18	1	15+2	1	1	0
15	DF	(Germany) GER	Jordan Beyer	10	0	8+1	0	1	0
17	DF	(Sweden) SWE	Oscar Wendt	34	1	30+2	1	2	0
24	DF	(Germany) GER	Tony Jantschke	15	0	10+4	0	1	0
28	DF	(Germany) GER	Matthias Ginter	29	2	27	2	2	0
29	DF	(France) FRA	Mamadou Doucouré	0	0	0	0	0	0
30	DF	(Switzerland) SUI	Nico Elvedi	31	2	30	2	1	0
38	DF	(Germany) GER	Marcel Benger	0	0	0	0	0	0
40	DF	(Denmark) DEN	Andreas Poulsen	1	0	0	0	0+1	0
42	DF	(Germany) GER	Florian Mayer	0	0	0	0	0	0
Midfielders
5	MF	(Germany) GER	Tobias Strobl	30	0	26+3	0	1	0
6	MF	(Germany) GER	Christoph Kramer	19	2	13+5	2	1	0
7	MF	(Germany) GER	Patrick Herrmann	25	3	10+14	3	0+1	0
8	MF	(Switzerland) SUI	Denis Zakaria	32	4	21+10	4	0+1	0
16	MF	(Guinea) GUI	Ibrahima Traoré	17	0	5+11	0	0+1	0
19	MF	(United States) USA	Fabian Johnson	18	1	11+7	1	0	0
23	MF	(Germany) GER	Jonas Hofmann	29	6	21+6	5	2	1
27	MF	(France) FRA	Michaël Cuisance	13	0	1+10	0	0+2	0
32	MF	(Germany) GER	Florian Neuhaus	34	4	25+7	3	2	1
37	MF	(England) ENG	Keanan Bennetts	0	0	0	0	0	0
Forwards
10	FW	(Belgium) BEL	Thorgan Hazard	35	13	33	10	2	3
11	FW	(Brazil) BRA	Raffael	14	5	5+8	2	1	3
13	FW	(Germany) GER	Lars Stindl	22	3	19+2	3	1	0
14	FW	(France) FRA	Alassane Pléa	35	15	28+6	12	1	3
18	FW	(Switzerland) SUI	Josip Drmić	5	2	2+3	2	0	0
20	FW	(Paraguay) PAR	Julio Villalba	0	0	0	0	0	0
26	FW	(Germany) GER	Torben Müsel	0	0	0	0	0	0
Players transferred out during the season
22	MF	(Slovakia) SVK	László Bénes	1	0	0+1	0	0	0

Last updated: 18 May 2019
Source: Competitions
