= Jordan Beyer =

German footballer (born 2000)

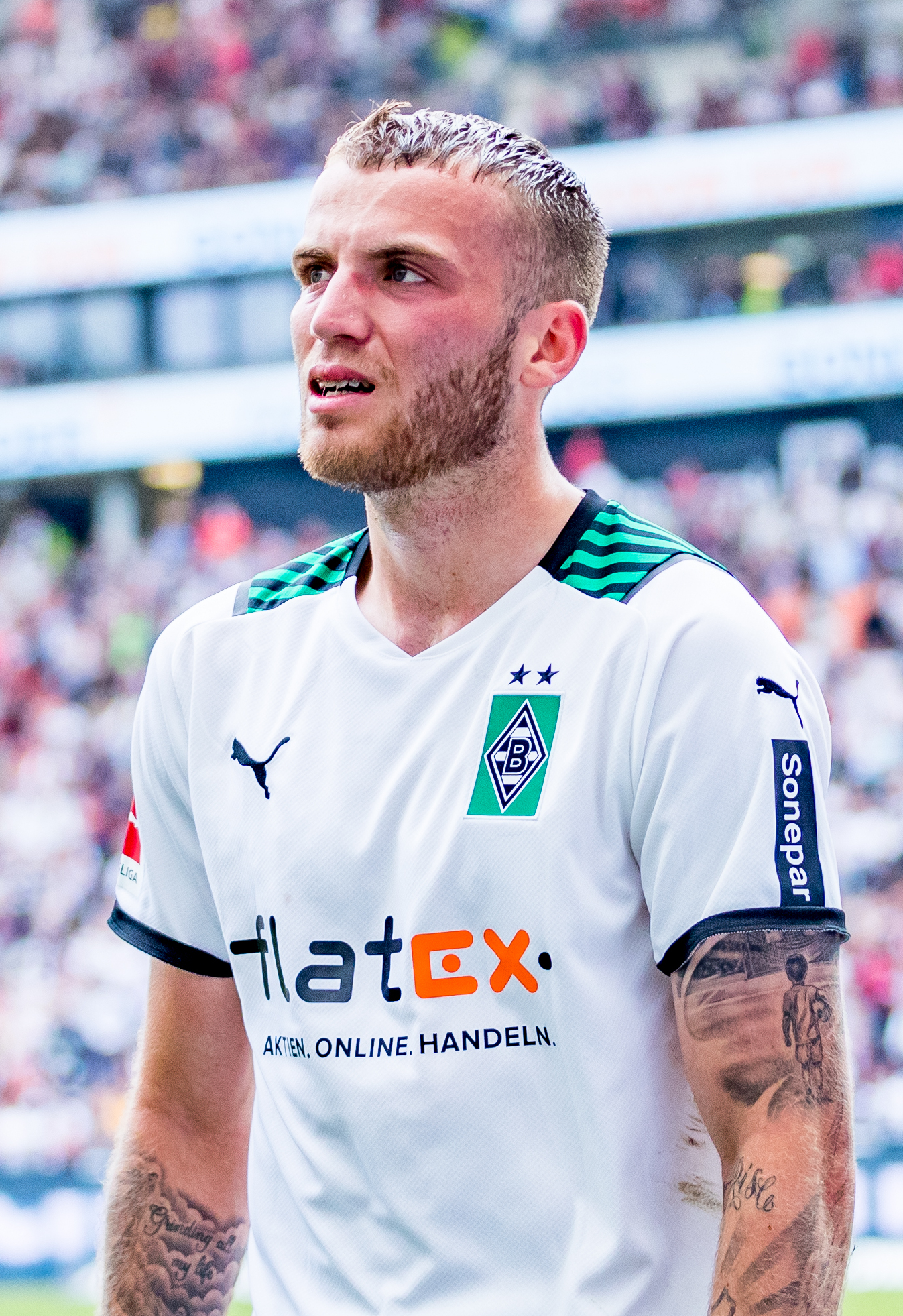
- Beyer in 2022

Personal information
- Full name: Louis Jordan Beyer
- Date of birth: 19 May 2000 (age 26)
- Place of birth: Kempen, Germany
- Height: 1.87 m (6 ft 2 in)
- Position: Centre-back

Team information
- Current team: Burnley
- Number: 36

Youth career
- –2012: DJK-SV Thomasstadt Kempen
- 2012–2015: Fortuna Düsseldorf
- 2015–2018: Borussia Mönchengladbach

Senior career*
Years	Team	Apps	(Gls)
2018–2021	Borussia Mönchengladbach II	13	(0)
2018–2023	Borussia Mönchengladbach	33	(0)
2020	→ Hamburger SV (loan)	11	(0)
2022–2023	→ Burnley (loan)	30	(1)
2023–	Burnley	15	(0)

International career
2015–2016	Germany U16	4	(0)
2016	Germany U17	3	(0)
2017–2018	Germany U18	5	(0)
2018	Germany U19	4	(0)
2019	Germany U20	1	(0)
2019–2023	Germany U21	7	(0)
- * Club domestic league appearances and goals as of 21:41, 30 December 2023 (UTC)

Louis Jordan Beyer (born 19 May 2000) is a German professional footballer who plays as a centre-back for EFL Championship club Burnley. He has represented Germany at U16 through U21 youth levels.

== Career ==
=== Borussia Mönchengladbach ===
==== Youth ====
Beyer started his career at hometown club DJK-SV Thomasstadt Kempen. As a player of the under-13 side he moved to the youth academy of Fortuna Düsseldorf in 2012. For the 2015–16 season, he joined the under-16 team of Borussia Mönchengladbach. In the 2016–17 season he advanced to the under-17s, with whom he played in the Under 17 Bundesliga. For the 2017–18 season, Beyer moved up to the under-19s, for whom he had already made an appearance in the Under 19 Bundesliga in the pre-season.

==== First team ====
For the 2018–19 season, Beyer was promoted to the first team under head coach Dieter Hecking. Under Hecking, he made his professional debut in the first round of the DFB-Pokal. In September 2018, Beyer signed his first professional contract, keeping him at the club until June 2022. Over the entire season, Beyer completed nine appearances in the Bundesliga, during which he was in the starting lineup eight times. In addition, he made four appearances for the second team in the fourth-tier Regionalliga West as well as once in the Under 19 Bundesliga.

During the first half of the 2019–20 season, under new head coach Marco Rose, Beyer made three appearances in the Bundesliga; all as a substitute. In addition, he appeared four times for the second team in the Regionalliga.

==== Loan to Hamburger SV ====
On 14 January 2020, Beyer joined Hamburger SV on loan in the 2. Bundesliga, reuniting him with Hecking who had become head coach there. Before the season was suspended in March due to the COVID-19 pandemic, Beyer had made seven appearances in the starting lineup. As the season was continued in mid-May, Josha Vagnoman, who Beyer had been brought in to replace due to a long-term injury, returned to the right-back position. This meant that Beyer moved to the centre back position alongside Timo Letschert. Beyer, however, soon lost his starting position to Rick van Drongelen after recording a weak performance, and was benched as a consequence. After that, Beyer only made sporadic appearances for HSV. In total, he played 11 times for HSV, who missed the promotion after ending in 4th place. With his loan deal ending, Beyer returned to Mönchengladbach after the season.

=== Burnley ===
Beyer joined EFL Championship club Burnley on a season-long loan on 1 September 2022. He made his Burnley debut on 13 September in a 1–1 away draw at Deepdale to Preston North End, coming on in the 62nd minute in place of injured Charlie Taylor. He made his first start four days later in place of Taylor, forming a centre-back duo with fellow loanee Taylor Harwood-Bellis in Burnley's 2–1 home victory against Bristol City. He scored his first goal for the club in a 1–0 win over Coventry City on 14 January 2023.

On 10 May 2023 Burnley announced they had activated the option to buy clause in his loan contract; he joined the club on a permanent four year deal.

Since December 2023 Beyer has suffered continuous serious injuries which have kept him out of competitive games for over 3 years.

== Personal life ==
Beyer was referred to by his first name, Louis, before his move to Borussia Monchengladbach. As he had Louis Hiepen as a namesake in his team, he was called "Jordan" – his second name – from then on.

== Career statistics ==
As of match played 30 December 2023

Appearances and goals by club, season and competition
Club	Season	League			National Cup (Note: Includes DFB-Pokal, FA Cup)		League Cup (Note: Includes EFL Cup)		Europe		Total	
Club	Season	Division	Apps	Goals	Apps	Goals	Apps	Goals	Apps	Goals	Apps	Goals
Borussia Mönchengladbach	2017–18	Bundesliga	0	0	0	0	—		—		0	0
Borussia Mönchengladbach	2018–19	Bundesliga	9	0	1	0	—		—		10	0
Borussia Mönchengladbach	2019–20	Bundesliga	3	0	1	0	—		0	0	4	0
Borussia Mönchengladbach	2020–21	Bundesliga	4	0	0	0	—		0	0	4	0
Borussia Mönchengladbach	2021–22	Bundesliga	17	0	1	0	—		—		18	0
Borussia Mönchengladbach	2022–23	Bundesliga	0	0	0	0	—		—		0	0
Borussia Mönchengladbach	Total		33	0	3	0	0	0	0	0	36	0
Hamburger SV (loan)	2019–20	2. Bundesliga	11	0	—		—		—		11	0
Burnley (loan)	2022–23	Championship	30	1	4	0	1	0	—		35	1
Burnley	2023–24	Premier League	15	0	0	0	0	0	—		15	0
Burnley	2024–25	Championship	0	0	0	0	0	0	—		0	0
Burnley	2025–26	Premier League	0	0	0	0	0	0	—		0	0
Burnley	Total		15	0	0	0	0	0	0	0	15	0
Career total			89	1	7	0	1	0	0	0	97	1

== Honours ==
Burnley

- EFL Championship: 2022–23
