= Alassane Pléa =

French footballer (born 1993)

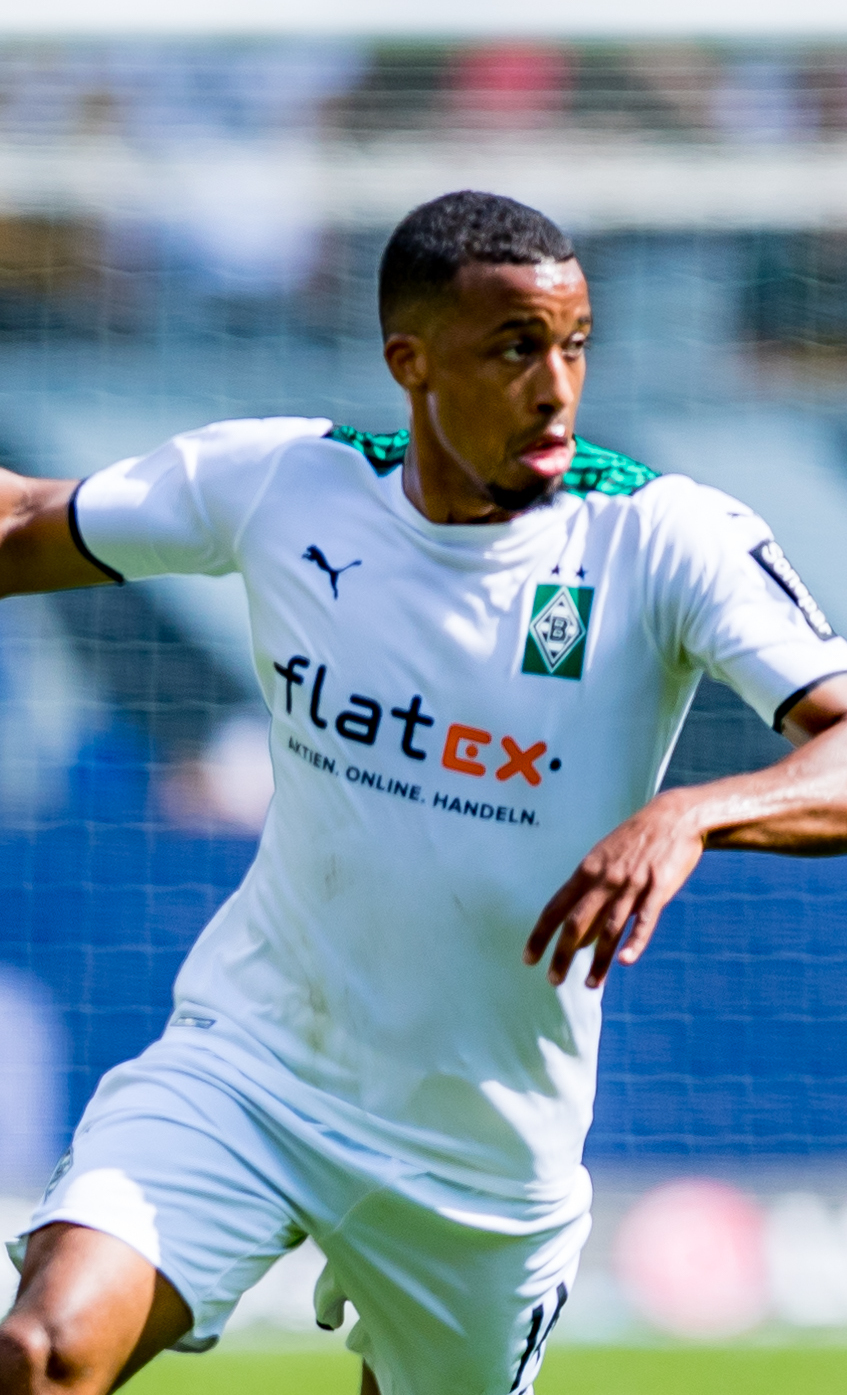
- Pléa playing for Borussia Mönchengladbach in 2022

Personal information
- Full name: Alassane Alexandre Pléa
- Date of birth: 10 March 1993 (age 33)
- Place of birth: Lille, Nord, France
- Height: 1.81 m (5 ft 11 in)
- Positions: Forward; left winger; attacking midfielder

Team information
- Current team: PSV
- Number: 14

Youth career
- 2002–2008: Ascq
- 2008–2010: Wasquehal
- 2009–2012: Lyon

Senior career*
Years	Team	Apps	(Gls)
2010–2014	Lyon B	67	(23)
2012–2014	Lyon	7	(0)
2014	→ Auxerre (loan)	15	(3)
2014–2018	Nice	112	(36)
2018–2025	Borussia Mönchengladbach	209	(58)
2025–	PSV	3	(0)

International career
2010	France U18	4	(1)
2011–2012	France U19	15	(2)
2012–2013	France U20	6	(3)
2014	France U21	1	(0)
2018	France	1	(0)
- * Club domestic league appearances and goals as of 8 August 2026 (UTC)

Alassane Alexandre Pléa (born 10 March 1993) is a French professional footballer who plays as a forward, left winger or attacking midfielder for Eredivisie club PSV Eindhoven.

== Early life ==
Pléa was born in Lille, Nord, France, and grew up in Villeneuve-d'Ascq.

== Club career ==
=== Lyon ===
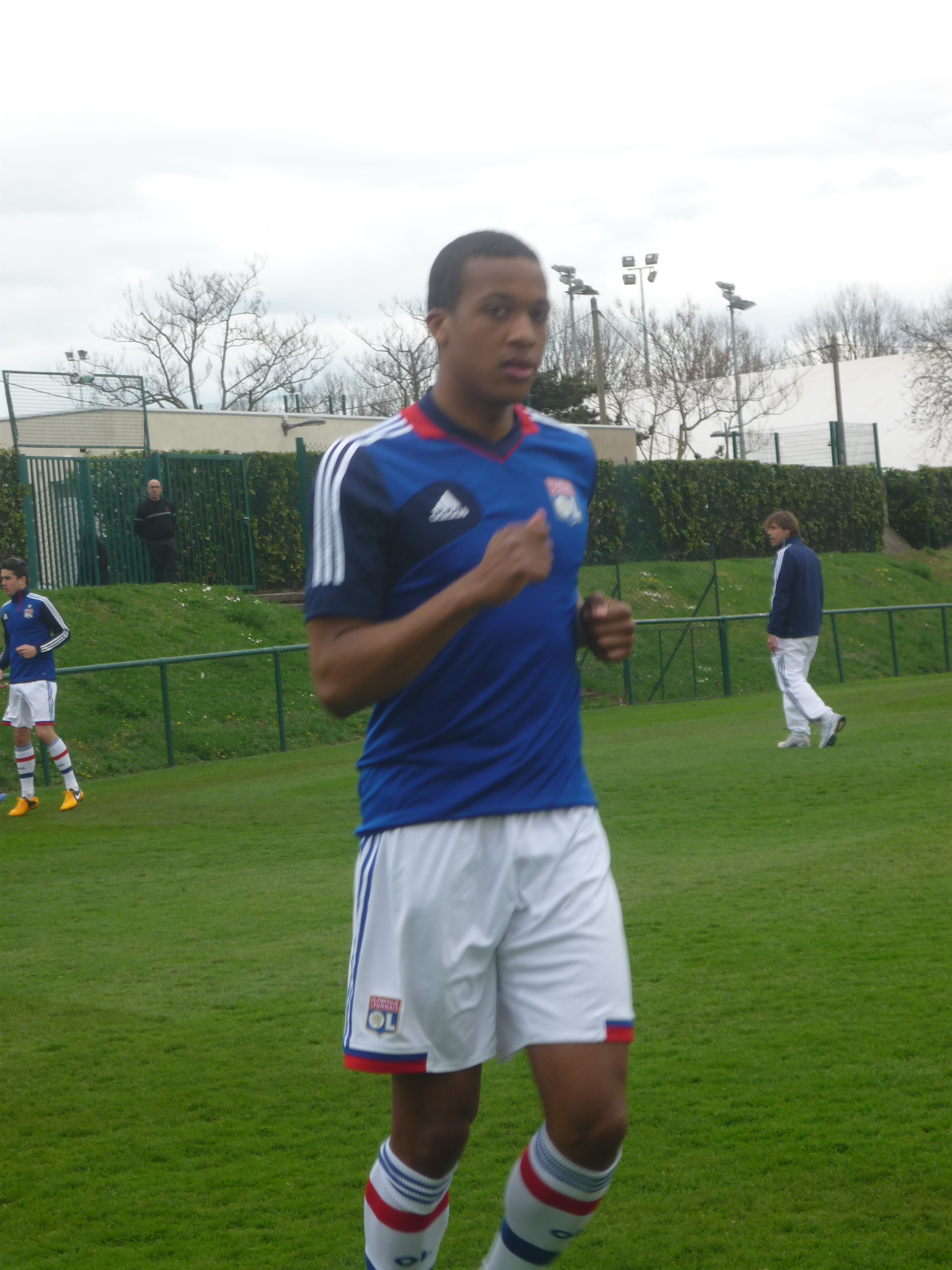
Pléa training for Lyon in 2013

Pléa made his senior debut for Lyon on 7 October 2012 in an away Ligue 1 match against Lorient, coming on as a substitute for Bafétimbi Gomis in the 90th minute; the match ended in a 1–1 draw.

=== Nice ===
Pléa left Lyon and joined Nice in the summer of 2014 in search of more game time in a deal worth £450,000. Under his first manager at Nice, Claude Puel, he was moved into the middle of the park and began to flourish first under Puel and then even more so under his successor Lucien Favre.

On 20 October 2016, Pléa scored the only goal in the 1–0 away victory against Red Bull Salzburg in the 2016–17 UEFA Europa League Group I match. That was Nice's first-ever UEFA club competition away win, having previously gone 15 UEFA club competition away matches without a win. 3 days later, he scored a hat-trick in a Ligue 1 match as leaders Nice won 4–2 at Metz to maintain their advantage at the top of the table at four points.

On 20 February 2017, Pléa underwent arthroscopy of the right knee in Lyon, which would likely put him out of action for five months. Eight days earlier, he had injured his right knee during the first half of a Ligue 1 match against Rennes and had to be substituted in the 43rd minute. As of 21 February 2017, he was Nice's top Ligue 1 scorer and was 5th in the Ligue 1 top scorers' chart of the 2016–17 season with 11 Ligue 1 goals.

Playing alongside Mario Balotelli, he proved much more than a wingman by notching 27 goals and nine assists across the 2016–17 and 2017–18 Ligue 1 seasons, helping Nice finish as high as third in 2016–17.

=== Borussia Mönchengladbach ===
In July 2018, Pléa joined German club Borussia Mönchengladbach on a five-year contract. The transfer fee paid to Nice was reported as €25 million. He made his debut for the club against BSC Hastedt in the first round of the DFB-Pokal on 19 August 2018 and scored a hat-trick as Gladbach cruised to an 11–1 win. He scored his first Bundesliga goal for the club on 1 September, securing a 1–1 draw away to FC Augsburg. He finished his debut season as the club's top scorer with 12 league goals and 15 across all competitions.

The following season, Pléa was praised for adding a creative edge to his attacking output, contributing eight goals and seven assists in his first 22 Bundesliga appearances. In the club's match against RB Leipzig on 1 February 2020, Pléa opened the scoring and then got his first two yellow cards of the season and was sent off as Gladbach fell to a 2–2 draw after leading 2–0. On 31 May, he scored his tenth league goal of the season and provided assists for both of Marcus Thuram's goals in a 4–1 victory over 1. FC Union Berlin.

Pléa scored his first goal of the season in a 3–1 Bundesliga victory over FC Köln on 3 October 2020. On 3 November, Pléa scored a hat-trick in a 6–0 rout of Shakhtar Donetsk away in the group stage of the Champions League. The result was the club's largest victory in competition history. He scored another two Champions League goals in a 2–3 group stage loss against Inter Milan on 1 December; he was denied a hat-trick and a equalizing goal by the video assistant referee (VAR) in the final minutes of the match.

On 13 August 2021, Pléa scored the first goal of the 2021–22 Bundesliga campaign in a 1–1 draw against Bayern Munich.

=== PSV Eindhoven ===
On 17 July 2025, Pléa signed for Dutch side PSV Eindhoven on a three-year deal.

== International career ==
Born in France, Pléa is Malian by descent. He is a France youth international having represented his nation at under-18, under-19, under-20 and under-21 levels. He played with the under-19 team at the 2012 UEFA European Under-19 Football Championship.

In November 2018, Pléa was called up into the senior French squad for the first time after the injury-enforced withdrawal of Anthony Martial and Alexandre Lacazette for the games against the Netherlands and Uruguay. He made his debut against the latter, replacing Olivier Giroud in the 80th minute of a 1–0 home win.

In December 2023, Pléa was included in a provisional list for the Mali national team squad for the 2023 Africa Cup of Nations.

== Career statistics ==
=== Club ===
As of match played 8 August 2026

Appearances and goals by club, season and competition
Club	Season	League			National cup (Note: Includes Coupe de France, DFB-Pokal)		League cup (Note: Includes Coupe de la Ligue)		Europe (Note: Includes UEFA Champions League and UEFA Europa League)		Other		Total	
Club	Season	Division	Apps	Goals	Apps	Goals	Apps	Goals	Apps	Goals	Apps	Goals	Apps	Goals
Lyon	2012–13	Ligue 1	1	0	0	0	0	0	2 (Note: Appearances in UEFA Europa League)	0	—		3	0
Lyon	2013–14	Ligue 1	6	0	0	0	0	0	3	1	—		9	1
Lyon	Total		7	0	0	0	0	0	5	1	—		12	1
Auxerre (loan)	2013–14	Ligue 2	15	3	1	0	0	0	—		—		16	3
Nice	2014–15	Ligue 1	33	3	1	0	1	0	—		—		35	3
Nice	2015–16	Ligue 1	19	6	0	0	0	0	—		—		19	6
Nice	2016–17	Ligue 1	25	11	1	1	1	1	5	1	—		32	14
Nice	2017–18	Ligue 1	35	16	1	0	2	1	11 (Note: Three appearances in UEFA Champions League, eight appearances and four goals in UEFA Europa League)	4	—		49	21
Nice	Total		112	36	3	1	4	2	16	5	—		135	44
Borussia Mönchengladbach	2018–19	Bundesliga	34	12	1	3	—		—		—		35	15
Borussia Mönchengladbach	2019–20	Bundesliga	27	10	1	0	–		5	0	—		33	10
Borussia Mönchengladbach	2020–21	Bundesliga	29	6	2	1	—		8 (Note: Appearances in UEFA Champions League)	5	—		39	12
Borussia Mönchengladbach	2021–22	Bundesliga	33	10	3	0	—		—		—		36	10
Borussia Mönchengladbach	2022–23	Bundesliga	29	2	2	0	—		—		—		31	2
Borussia Mönchengladbach	2023–24	Bundesliga	27	7	3	0	—		—		—		30	7
Borussia Mönchengladbach	2024–25	Bundesliga	29	11	2	1	—		—		—		31	12
Borussia Mönchengladbach	Total		208	58	14	5	—		13	5	—		235	68
PSV	2025–26	Eredivisie	2	0	0	0	—		0	0	1 (Note: Appearance in Johan Cruyff Shield)	0	3	0
PSV	2026–27	Eredivisie	1	0	0	0	—		0	0	—		1	0
PSV	Total		3	0	0	0	—		0	0	1	0	4	0
Career total			345	97	18	6	4	2	34	11	1	0	402	118

=== International ===
Appearances and goals by national team and year
National team	Year	Apps	Goals
France	2018	1	0
Total		1	0

== Honours ==
PSV

- Eredivisie: 2025–26
- Johan Cruyff Shield: 2025
