= Matthias Ginter =

German association football player

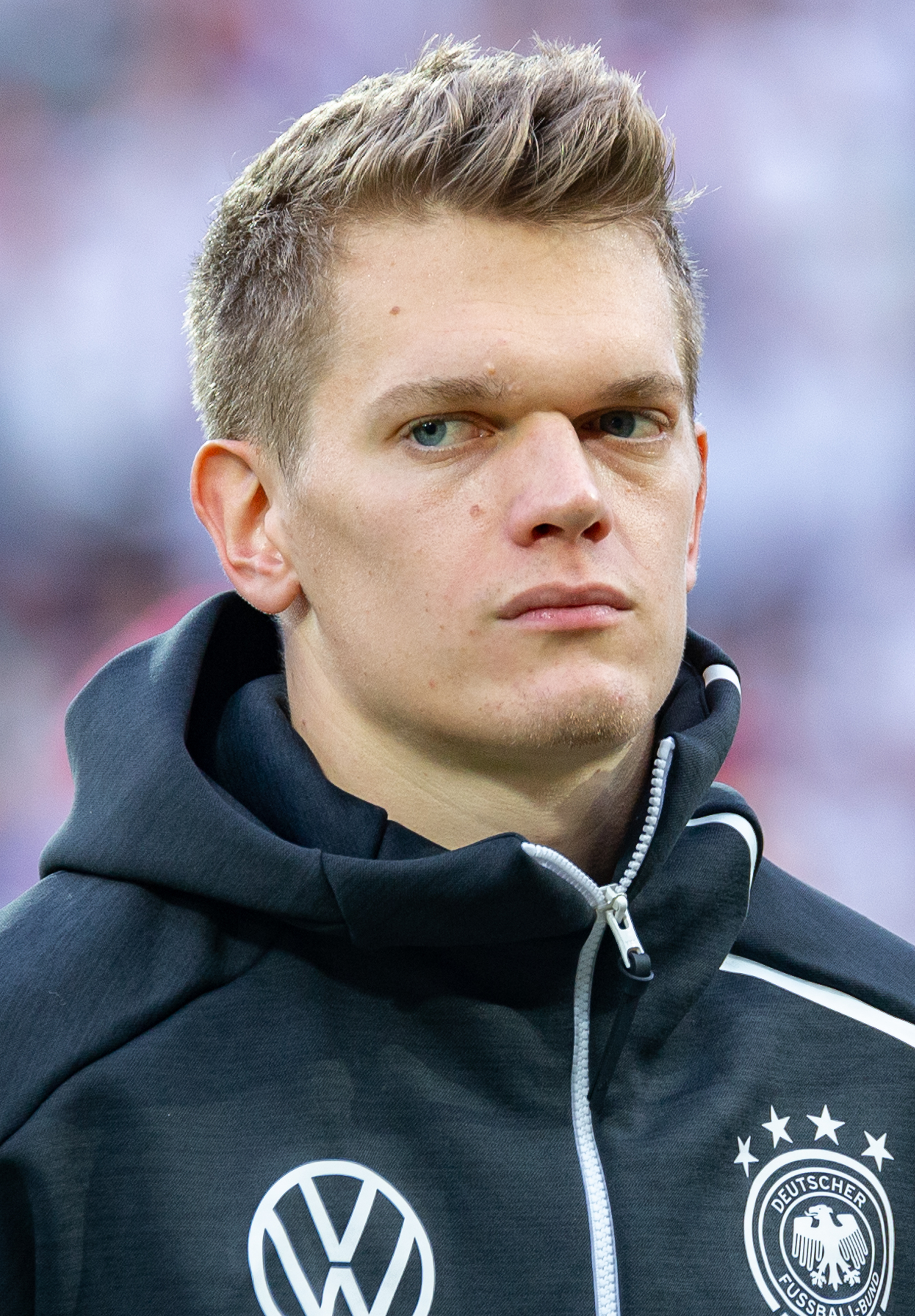
- Ginter with Germany in 2019

Personal information
- Full name: Matthias Lukas Ginter
- Date of birth: 19 January 1994 (age 32)
- Place of birth: Freiburg im Breisgau, Germany
- Height: 1.91 m (6 ft 3 in)
- Position: Centre-back

Team information
- Current team: SC Freiburg
- Number: 28

Youth career
- 1998–2005: SC March
- 2005–2012: SC Freiburg

Senior career*
Years	Team	Apps	(Gls)
2012–2014	SC Freiburg	70	(2)
2014–2017	Borussia Dortmund	67	(3)
2017–2022	Borussia Mönchengladbach	154	(11)
2022–	SC Freiburg	129	(9)

International career
2011–2012	Germany U18	6	(0)
2012–2013	Germany U19	5	(1)
2013–2017	Germany U21	18	(1)
2016	Germany U23	5	(2)
2014–2023	Germany	51	(2)
Medal record
Men's football
Representing Germany
FIFA World Cup
Winner	2014 Brazil
FIFA Confederations Cup
Winner	2017 Russia
Olympic Games
Silver medal – second place	2016 Rio de Janeiro	Team
- * Club domestic league appearances and goals as of 17:30, 31 October 2026 (UTC)

Matthias Lukas Ginter (German pronunciation: [maˈtiːas ˈɡɪntɐ]; born 19 January 1994) is a German professional footballer who plays as a centre-back for Bundesliga club SC Freiburg.

== Club career ==
=== Early career ===
Ginter began his career with SV March before he moved to the youth squad of SC Freiburg for the 2005–06 season. With the under-19 team he won the Under-19 DFB-Pokal in 2011 and 2012.

In January 2012, Ginter trained with Freiburg's first team due, in part, to a loss of several players from the roster during the winter transfer window. On 21 January 2012, Ginter made his professional debut when he was substituted in for Anton Putsila in the 70th minute against fellow relegation battlers FC Augsburg. In the 88th minute of the game, he scored the winning goal from a free-kick by Michael Lumb for his team in the 1–0 victory. The goal, which came two days after Ginter's 18th birthday, made him SCF's youngest Bundesliga goalscorer in the club's history. The record was previously held by Dennis Aogo.

=== Borussia Dortmund ===
On 17 July 2014 Ginter signed for Borussia Dortmund on a five-year deal. He made his debut on 13 August, playing the full match as they won the DFL-Supercup 2–0 against Bayern Munich at the Westfalenstadion.

=== Borussia Mönchengladbach ===
On 4 July 2017, Ginter signed with Dortmund rivals Mönchengladbach on a four-year deal. The move was worth around €17 million.

=== Return to SC Freiburg ===
On 4 May 2022, Freiburg (the club where Ginter began his career) announced Ginter's signing from Mönchengladbach on a free transfer ahead of the 2022–23 season. On 20 May 2026, he would play in his club's first European final in the Europa League, but finish runner-up.

== International career ==
=== Youth ===
Ginter represented the under-21 team at the 2015 European Championship in the Czech Republic, starting all four matches. In their second group match at the Eden Arena in Prague against Denmark, following two Kevin Volland goals, Ginter rounded off the scoring by heading in Amin Younes' cross in the 53rd minute, leading to a 3–0 victory.

=== Senior ===
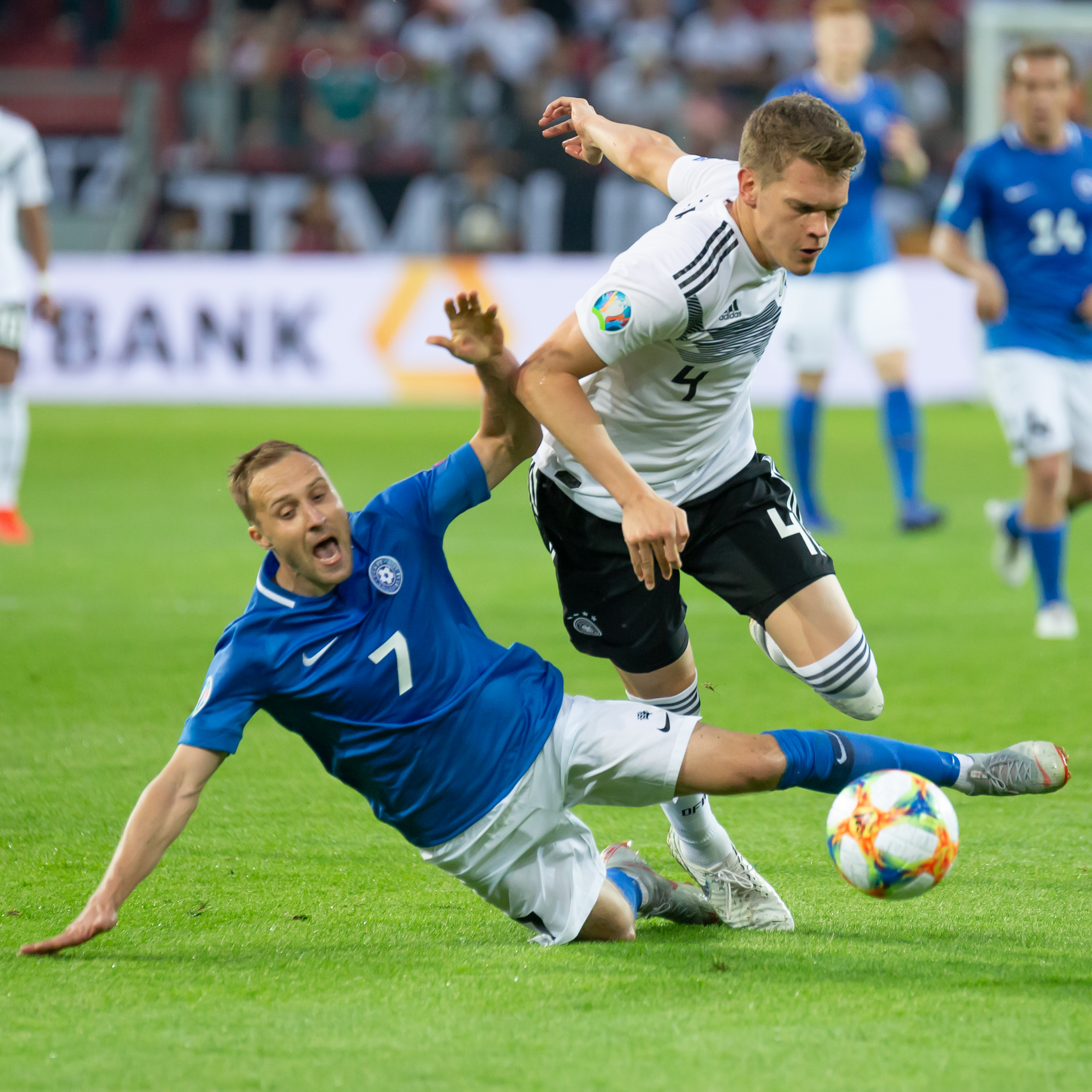
Ginter (right) playing for Germany in 2019

On 5 March 2014, Ginter debuted for the German senior squad after coming on as a 90th-minute substitute for Mesut Özil in the 1–0 win over Chile in a friendly match at the Olympiastadion in Berlin. He became the 900th player to be capped by the Germany national team. In June 2014, he was named as the youngest player in Germany's 23-man squad for the 2014 FIFA World Cup, which went on to win the tournament, although he did not enter the field of play at any point.

He was part of the squad for the 2016 Summer Olympics, where Germany won the silver medal.

Along with fellow World Cup-winner Shkodran Mustafi and Julian Draxler, Ginter won the 2017 FIFA Confederations Cup.

On 4 June 2018, Ginter was selected in Germany's final 23-man squad for the 2018 FIFA World Cup. He would not play, making him the only outfield player in German football history who participated in two World Cup campaigns without playing a single minute. Ginter scored his first goal for Germany on 16 November 2019 in a match against Belarus.

On 19 May 2021, he was selected to the squad for the UEFA Euro 2020.

In November 2022, he was named in the final squad for the 2022 FIFA World Cup in Qatar. On 1 December, he made his World Cup debut in his third tournament, coming on as a substitute to Niklas Süle in the 90+3 minute, in a 4–2 win over Costa Rica in the last group stage match.

== Personal life ==
In May 2018, Ginter married his wife Christina. In 2020 their son was born on Ginter's own birthday, 19 January.

In October 2021, the team where Ginter started his career, SC March, renamed their stadium "Matthias-Ginter-Sportpark".

== Career statistics ==
=== Club ===
As of match played 31 October 2026

Appearances and goals by club, season and competition
Club	Season	League			DFB-Pokal		Europe		Other		Total	
Club	Season	Division	Apps	Goals	Apps	Goals	Apps	Goals	Apps	Goals	Apps	Goals
SC Freiburg	2011–12	Bundesliga	13	1	0	0	—		—		13	1
SC Freiburg	2012–13	Bundesliga	23	1	3	0	—		—		26	1
SC Freiburg	2013–14	Bundesliga	34	0	3	2	5 (Note: Appearances in UEFA Europa League)	1	—		42	3
SC Freiburg	Total		70	2	6	2	5	1	—		81	5
Borussia Dortmund	2014–15	Bundesliga	14	0	0	0	5 (Note: Appearances in UEFA Champions League)	0	1 (Note: Appearance in DFL-Supercup)	0	20	0
Borussia Dortmund	2015–16	Bundesliga	24	3	5	0	11	1	—		40	4
Borussia Dortmund	2016–17	Bundesliga	29	0	5	0	8	0	0	0	42	0
Borussia Dortmund	Total		67	3	10	0	24	1	1	0	102	4
Borussia Mönchengladbach	2017–18	Bundesliga	34	5	3	0	—		—		37	5
Borussia Mönchengladbach	2018–19	Bundesliga	27	2	2	0	—		—		29	2
Borussia Mönchengladbach	2019–20	Bundesliga	31	1	1	0	4	0	—		36	1
Borussia Mönchengladbach	2020–21	Bundesliga	34	2	4	0	8	0	—		46	2
Borussia Mönchengladbach	2021–22	Bundesliga	28	1	3	0	—		—		31	1
Borussia Mönchengladbach	Total		154	11	13	0	12	0	—		179	11
SC Freiburg	2022–23	Bundesliga	34	4	5	1	8	0	—		47	5
SC Freiburg	2023–24	Bundesliga	23	0	2	0	9	0	—		34	0
SC Freiburg	2024–25	Bundesliga	32	2	2	1	—		—		34	3
SC Freiburg	2025–26	Bundesliga	32	3	5	0	15	2	—		52	5
SC Freiburg	2026–27	Bundesliga	8	0	2	0	4 (Note: Appearances in UEFA Conference League)	2	—		14	2
SC Freiburg	Total		129	9	16	2	36	4	—		181	15
Career total			420	25	45	4	77	6	1	0	543	35

=== International ===
As of match played 12 June 2023

Appearances and goals by national team and year
National team	Year	Apps	Goals
Germany
Germany	2014	5	0
Germany	2015	3	0
Germany	2016	1	0
Germany	2017	8	0
Germany	2018	6	0
Germany	2019	6	1
Germany	2020	6	1
Germany	2021	11	0
Germany	2022	2	0
Germany	2023	3	0
Total		51	2

As of match played 12 June 2023. Germany score listed first, score column indicates score after each Ginter goal.

List of international goals scored by Matthias Ginter
No.	Date	Venue	Opponent	Score	Result	Competition
1	16 November 2019	Borussia-Park, Mönchengladbach, Germany	Belarus	1–0	4–0	UEFA Euro 2020 qualification
2	10 October 2020	NSC Olimpiyskiy Stadium, Kyiv, Ukraine	Ukraine	1–0	2–1	2020–21 UEFA Nations League A

== Honours ==
Borussia Dortmund

- DFB-Pokal: 2016–17
- DFL-Supercup: 2014

SC Freiburg

- UEFA Europa League runner-up: 2025–26

Germany

- FIFA World Cup: 2014
- FIFA Confederations Cup: 2017

Germany U23

- Olympic Silver Medal: 2016

Individual

- Fritz Walter Medal U18 Gold: 2012
- Fritz Walter Medal U19 Gold: 2013
- Germany national team Player of the Year: 2019
- kicker Bundesliga Team of the Season: 2019–20, 2020–21, 2022–23, 2024–25
- UEFA Europa League Team of the Season: 2025–26
- Nickelodeon Kids' Choice Awards – Favorite Football Player (Germany, Austria, & Switzerland) nominee: 2020

Orders

- Silbernes Lorbeerblatt: 2014
