= Luca Netz =

German footballer (born 2003)

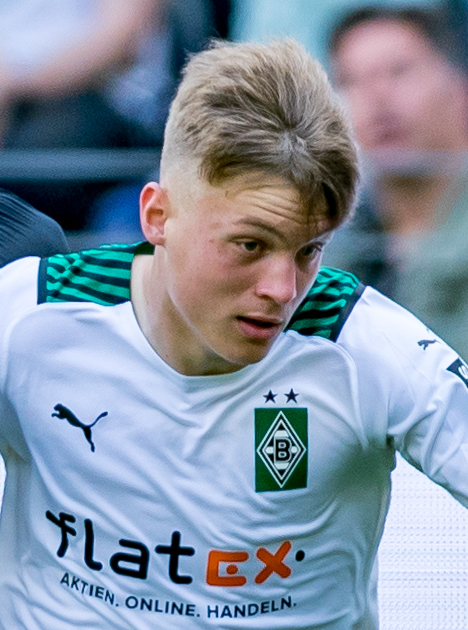
- Netz with Borussia Mönchengladbach in 2022

Personal information
- Date of birth: 15 May 2003 (age 23)
- Place of birth: Berlin, Germany
- Height: 1.84 m (6 ft 0 in)
- Position: Left-back

Team information
- Current team: Nottingham Forest
- Number: 25

Youth career
- –2010: FSV Bernau
- 2010–2020: Hertha BSC

Senior career*
| Years | Team | Apps | (Gls) |
| 2020–2021 | Hertha BSC II | 4 | (0) |
| 2020–2021 | Hertha BSC | 11 | (1) |
| 2021 | Borussia Mönchengladbach II | 2 | (1) |
| 2021–2026 | Borussia Mönchengladbach | 113 | (1) |
| 2026– | Nottingham Forest | 11 | (0) |

International career^{‡}
| 2018 | Germany U15 | 2 | (0) |
| 2018–2020 | Germany U17 | 21 | (5) |
| 2021–2024 | Germany U21 | 17 | (0) |
- * Club domestic league appearances and goals as of 22:01, 23 October 2026 (UTC) ‡ National team caps and goals as of 09:37, 13 October 2024 (UTC)

Luca Netz (born 15 May 2003) is a German professional footballer who plays as a left-back for Premier League club Nottingham Forest. He is a former German youth international.

== Club career ==
Netz was born in Berlin, Germany. He made his professional debut for Hertha BSC in the Bundesliga on 2 January 2021, coming on as a substitute in the 86th minute for Marvin Plattenhardt against Schalke 04. The home match finished as a 3–0 win for Hertha. On 13 February 2021, Netz scored his first Bundesliga goal in the 82nd minute against VfB Stuttgart. His goal equalized the game, and the match ended in a 1-1 draw.

On 2 February 2026, English Premier League club Nottingham Forest announced his signing, on a four-and-a-half year deal for reported transfer fee of £1,100,000.

== International career ==
Netz played two matches for the Germany national under-15 football team in May 2018. From September 2018 to February 2020, he was part of the Germany national under-17 football team, with whom he participated in the 2019 UEFA European Under-17 Championship in Ireland. Netz was nominated for the Germany national under-21 football team squad for the 2023 UEFA European Under-21 Championship in Romania and Georgia.

== Career statistics ==
As of match played 23 October 2026

Appearances and goals by club, season and competition
| Club | Season | League | | | National cup (Note: Includes DFB-Pokal) | | League cup (Note: Includes EFL Cup) | | Europe | | Total | |
| Club | Season | Division | Apps | Goals | Apps | Goals | Apps | Goals | Apps | Goals | Apps | Goals |
|---|---|---|---|---|---|---|---|---|---|---|---|---|
| Hertha BSC II | 2020–21 | Regionalliga Nordost | 4 | 0 | — | | — | | — | | 4 | 0 |
| Hertha BSC | 2020–21 | Bundesliga | 11 | 1 | 0 | 0 | — | | — | | 11 | 1 |
| Borussia Mönchengladbach II | 2021–22 | Regionalliga West | 1 | 1 | — | | — | | — | | 1 | 1 |
| Borussia Mönchengladbach II | 2022–23 | Regionalliga West | 1 | 0 | — | | — | | — | | 1 | 0 |
| Borussia Mönchengladbach II | Total | | 2 | 1 | — | | — | | — | | 2 | 1 |
| Borussia Mönchengladbach | 2021–22 | Bundesliga | 24 | 0 | 2 | 0 | — | | — | | 26 | 0 |
| Borussia Mönchengladbach | 2022–23 | Bundesliga | 20 | 1 | 2 | 1 | — | | — | | 22 | 2 |
| Borussia Mönchengladbach | 2023–24 | Bundesliga | 30 | 0 | 4 | 0 | — | | — | | 34 | 0 |
| Borussia Mönchengladbach | 2024–25 | Bundesliga | 24 | 0 | 1 | 1 | — | | — | | 25 | 1 |
| Borussia Mönchengladbach | 2025–26 | Bundesliga | 15 | 0 | 2 | 0 | — | | — | | 17 | 0 |
| Borussia Mönchengladbach | Total | | 113 | 1 | 11 | 2 | — | | — | | 124 | 3 |
| Nottingham Forest | 2025–26 | Premier League | 7 | 0 | — | | — | | 0 | 0 | 7 | 0 |
| Nottingham Forest | 2026–27 | Premier League | 4 | 0 | 0 | 0 | 1 | 0 | — | | 5 | 0 |
| Nottingham Forest | Total | | 11 | 0 | 0 | 0 | 1 | 0 | 0 | 0 | 12 | 0 |
| Career total | | | 141 | 3 | 11 | 2 | 1 | 0 | 0 | 0 | 153 | 5 |

== Honours ==
Individual

- Fritz Walter Medal U19 Silver: 2022
- Fritz Walter Medal U17 Bronze: 2020
