= Conor Noß =

Footballer (born 2001)

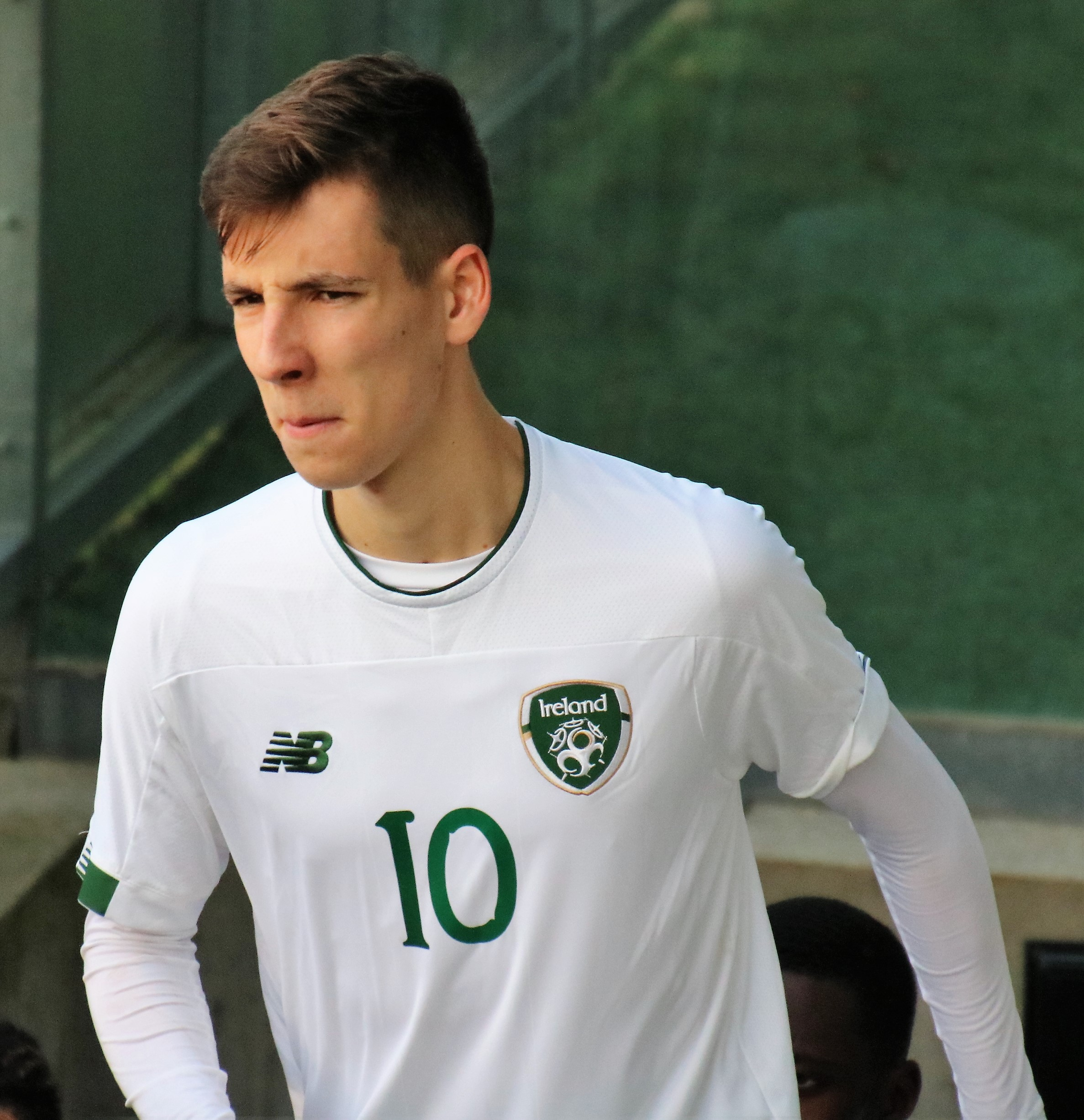
- Noß with the Republic of Ireland U19 in 2019

Personal information
- Date of birth: 1 January 2001 (age 25)
- Place of birth: Düsseldorf, Germany
- Height: 1.81 m (5 ft 11 in)
- Position: Midfielder

Team information
- Current team: MSV Duisburg
- Number: 14

Youth career
- 2008–2009: SF Vorst
- 2009–2019: Borussia Mönchengladbach

Senior career*
| Years | Team | Apps | (Gls) |
| 2019–2023 | Borussia Mönchengladbach II | 71 | (8) |
| 2019–2023 | Borussia Mönchengladbach | 3 | (0) |
| 2023–2025 | Blau-Weiß Linz | 49 | (4) |
| 2025– | MSV Duisburg | 50 | (13) |

International career
| 2019 | Republic of Ireland U19 | 3 | (0) |
| 2021–2022 | Republic of Ireland U21 | 11 | (0) |
- * Club domestic league appearances and goals as of 17:42, 7 November 2026 (UTC)

Conor Noß (born 1 January 2001) is a professional footballer who plays as a midfielder for 3. Liga club MSV Duisburg. Born in Germany, he is a former youth international for the Republic of Ireland.

== Club career ==
=== Borussia Mönchengladbach ===
Noß began playing football with SF Vorst in 2008, and moved to the youth academy of Borussia Mönchengladbach in 2009. On 7 July 2021, he signed his first professional contract with the club for three years. On 20 November 2021, Noß debuted for Gladbach during a 4–0 Bundesliga win over Greuther Fürth.

=== Blau-Weiß Linz ===
On 18 July 2023, Noß signed a two-year contract with Blau-Weiß Linz who had just been newly promoted to the Austrian Bundesliga. He made his debut on 29 July 2023, replacing Stefan Haudum at half time in a 2–1 loss away to Wolfsberger AC. On 2 September 2023 he scored his first goal for the club, scoring in a 4–2 win away to WSG Tirol at Tivoli Stadion Tirol.

=== MSV Duisburg ===
In June 2025, he signed with recently promoted 3. Liga club MSV Duisburg.

== International career ==
Noß is a former youth player for the Republic of Ireland, playing at their under-21 and under-19 levels.

== Career statistics ==
As of match played on 7 November 2026

Appearances and goals by club, season and competition
| Club | Season | League | | | National cup (Note: Includes DFB-Pokal & Austrian Cup) | | Total | |
| Club | Season | Division | Apps | Goals | Apps | Goals | Apps | Goals |
|---|---|---|---|---|---|---|---|---|
| Borussia Mönchengladbach II | 2019–20 | Regionalliga West | 15 | 0 | — | | 15 | 0 |
| Borussia Mönchengladbach II | 2020–21 | Regionalliga West | 21 | 1 | — | | 21 | 1 |
| Borussia Mönchengladbach II | 2021–22 | Regionalliga West | 13 | 1 | — | | 13 | 1 |
| Borussia Mönchengladbach II | 2022–23 | Regionalliga West | 22 | 6 | — | | 22 | 6 |
| Borussia Mönchengladbach II | Total | | 71 | 8 | — | | 71 | 8 |
| Borussia Mönchengladbach | 2019–20 | Bundesliga | 0 | 0 | 0 | 0 | 0 | 0 |
| Borussia Mönchengladbach | 2020–21 | Bundesliga | 0 | 0 | 0 | 0 | 0 | 0 |
| Borussia Mönchengladbach | 2021–22 | Bundesliga | 3 | 0 | 0 | 0 | 3 | 0 |
| Borussia Mönchengladbach | 2022–23 | Bundesliga | 0 | 0 | 0 | 0 | 0 | 0 |
| Borussia Mönchengladbach | Total | | 3 | 0 | 0 | 0 | 3 | 0 |
| Blau-Weiß Linz | 2023–24 | Austrian Bundesliga | 32 | 2 | 3 | 0 | 35 | 2 |
| Blau-Weiß Linz | 2024–25 | Austrian Bundesliga | 17 | 2 | 2 | 1 | 19 | 3 |
| Blau-Weiß Linz | Total | | 49 | 4 | 5 | 1 | 54 | 5 |
| MSV Duisburg | 2025–26 | 3. Liga | 38 | 10 | — | | 38 | 10 |
| MSV Duisburg | 2026–27 | 3. Liga | 12 | 3 | 1 | 0 | 13 | 3 |
| MSV Duisburg | Total | | 50 | 13 | 1 | 0 | 51 | 13 |
| Career total | | | 172 | 25 | 6 | 1 | 178 | 26 |
