= Florian Neuhaus =

German footballer (born 1997)

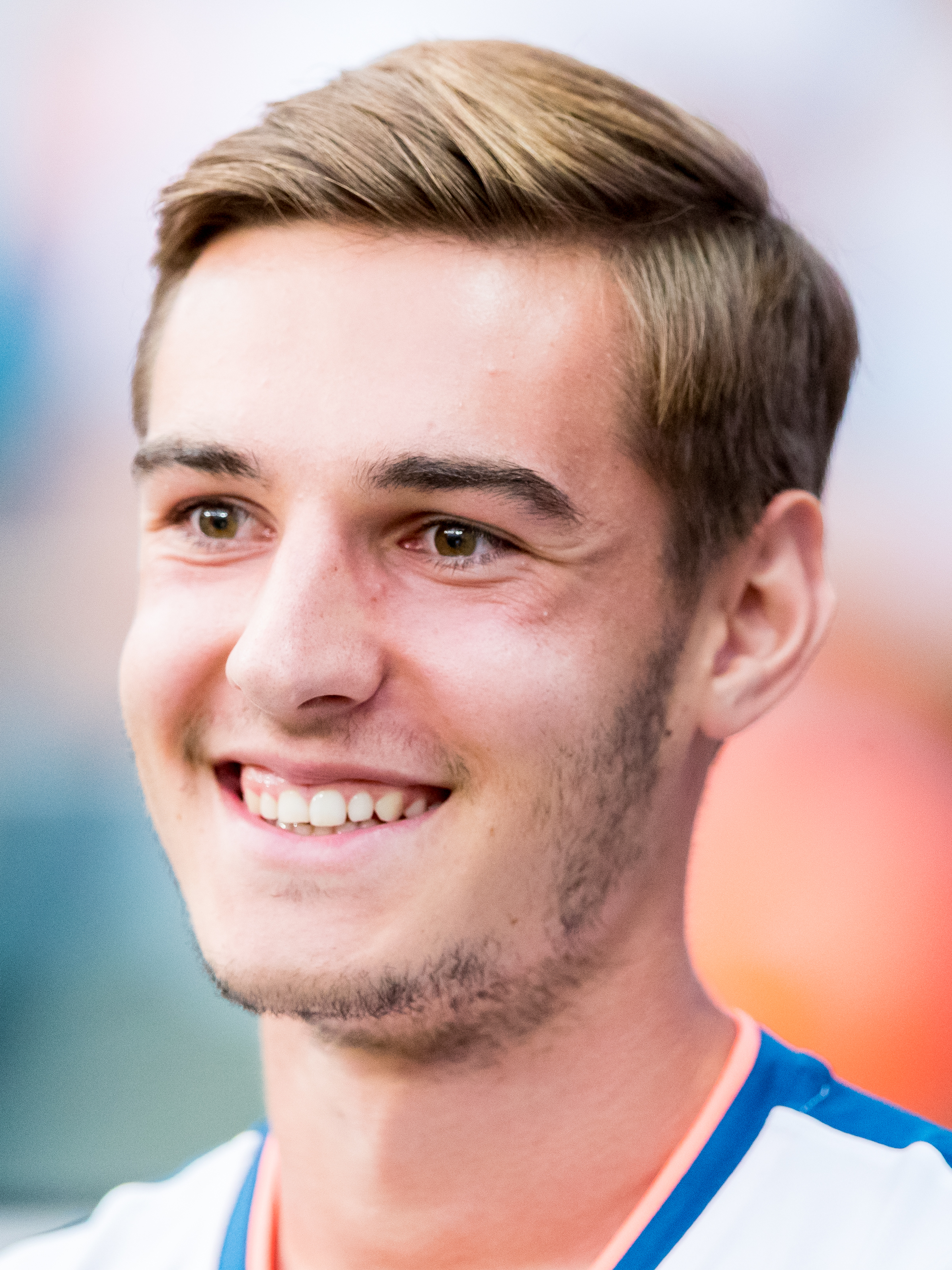
- Neuhaus in 2022

Personal information
- Full name: Florian Christian Neuhaus
- Date of birth: 16 March 1997 (age 29)
- Place of birth: Landsberg am Lech, Germany
- Height: 1.85 m (6 ft 1 in)
- Position: Midfielder

Team information
- Current team: Borussia Mönchengladbach
- Number: 10

Youth career
- VfL Kaufering
- –2016: 1860 Munich

Senior career*
Years	Team	Apps	(Gls)
2016–2017	1860 Munich II	6	(1)
2016–2017	1860 Munich	12	(0)
2017–	Borussia Mönchengladbach	213	(23)
2017–2018	→ Fortuna Düsseldorf (loan)	27	(6)

International career
2016–2017	Germany U20	6	(0)
2017–2019	Germany U21	17	(1)
2020–2022	Germany	10	(2)
- * Club domestic league appearances and goals as of 17:30, 31 October 2026 (UTC)

Florian Christian Neuhaus (German pronunciation: [ˈfloːʁi̯aːn ˈnɔʏhaʊs]; born 16 March 1997) is a German professional footballer who plays as a midfielder for Bundesliga club Borussia Mönchengladbach.

Neuhaus began his career with local side 1860 Munich, debuting for them in 2016. A year later, he moved to Bundesliga club Borussia Mönchengladbach, where he was then immediately sent on loan to Fortuna Düsseldorf for the 2017–18 season. Since his return, he has made over 240 appearances for the club, and had played an instrumental part in the club's midfield position.

== Club career ==
=== Early career ===
Neuhaus was born 40 miles outside of Munich and started his youth career with local club 1860 Munich. In the semi-finals of the German youth league in 2016, Neuhaus scored the winner against Borussia Dortmund in a 2–1 victory, doing so from the halfway line in the 89th minute. The strike was named Goal of the Month by German broadcaster Sportschau.

=== Borussia Mönchengladbach ===
After impressing in the 2. Bundesliga in his debut professional season with 1860 Munich, he moved to Borussia Mönchengladbach in the summer of 2017 on a long-term contract. He was immediately loaned to Fortuna Düsseldorf for the 2017–18 season, where his six goals and three assists in 27 second-tier matches helped Fortuna clinch the league title and promotion to the top flight.

On 19 November 2019, Mönchengladbach announced that Neuhaus had signed a contract extension with the club lasting until 2024. At the time of signing, Neuhaus had made 50 appearances for Die Fohlen and had contributed five goals and 10 assists in all competitions. He had gone on to play in all but two of Gladbach's Bundesliga outings during the 2018–19 season, and only missed four league outings during the 2019–20 season, becoming a key part of Marco Rose's squad. On 12 September 2020, he scored two goals as Gladbach defeated Oberneuland by a score of 8–0 in the first round of the DFB-Pokal.

On 28 July 2023, Neuhaus extended his contract with Mönchengladbach on a four-year deal, keeping him with the club until 2027.

In July 2025, Neuhaus was fined and demoted to Mönchengladbach's under-23 squad after a video circulated online of the player insulting Mönchengladbach's then-sporting director Roland Virkus, calling him the "worst manager in the world", and criticizing Virkus' decision to give Neuhaus an annual salary of €4 million.

== International career ==
Neuhaus is a former youth international for Germany. He was called up to the senior Germany squad for the UEFA Nations League matches against Spain and Switzerland in September 2020. He made his debut for Germany on 7 October 2020 in a friendly against Turkey, scoring his first international goal in the same match.

On 19 May 2021, Neuhaus was selected to the 26-man Germany squad for the postponed UEFA Euro 2020.

== Career statistics ==
=== Club ===
As of match played 31 October 2026

Appearances and goals by club, season and competition
Club	Season	League			Cup		Europe		Other		Total	
Club	Season	Division	Apps	Goals	Apps	Goals	Apps	Goals	Apps	Goals	Apps	Goals
1860 Munich II	2016–17	Regionalliga Bayern	6	1	0	0	—		0	0	6	1
1860 Munich	2016–17	2. Bundesliga	12	0	1	0	—		2	1	15	1
Borussia Mönchengladbach	2017–18	Bundesliga	0	0	0	0	—		—		0	0
Borussia Mönchengladbach	2018–19	Bundesliga	32	3	2	1	—		—		34	4
Borussia Mönchengladbach	2019–20	Bundesliga	30	4	2	0	5	0	—		37	4
Borussia Mönchengladbach	2020–21	Bundesliga	33	6	4	2	8	0	—		45	8
Borussia Mönchengladbach	2021–22	Bundesliga	29	4	3	0	—		—		32	4
Borussia Mönchengladbach	2022–23	Bundesliga	23	1	1	1	—		—		24	2
Borussia Mönchengladbach	2023–24	Bundesliga	25	3	4	0	—		—		29	3
Borussia Mönchengladbach	2024–25	Bundesliga	18	0	1	0	—		—		19	0
Borussia Mönchengladbach	2025–26	Bundesliga	16	0	1	0	—		—		17	0
Borussia Mönchengladbach	2026–27	Bundesliga	5	1	0	0	—		—		5	1
Borussia Mönchengladbach	Total		211	22	18	4	13	0	—		244	26
Fortuna Düsseldorf (loan)	2017–18	2. Bundesliga	27	6	2	0	—		—		29	6
Career total			258	29	21	4	13	0	2	1	294	34

=== International ===
Appearances and goals by national team and year
National team	Year	Apps	Goals
Germany
Germany	2020	3	1
Germany	2021	6	1
Germany	2022	1	0
Total		10	2

List of international goals scored by Florian Neuhaus
No.	Date	Venue	Opponent	Score	Result	Competition
1	7 October 2020	RheinEnergieStadion, Cologne, Germany	Turkey	2–1	3–3	Friendly
2	2 June 2021	Tivoli Stadion Tirol, Innsbruck, Austria	Denmark	1–0	1–1	Friendly

== Honours ==
Fortuna Düsseldorf

- 2. Bundesliga: 2017–18
