= Jonas Hofmann =

German footballer (born 1992)

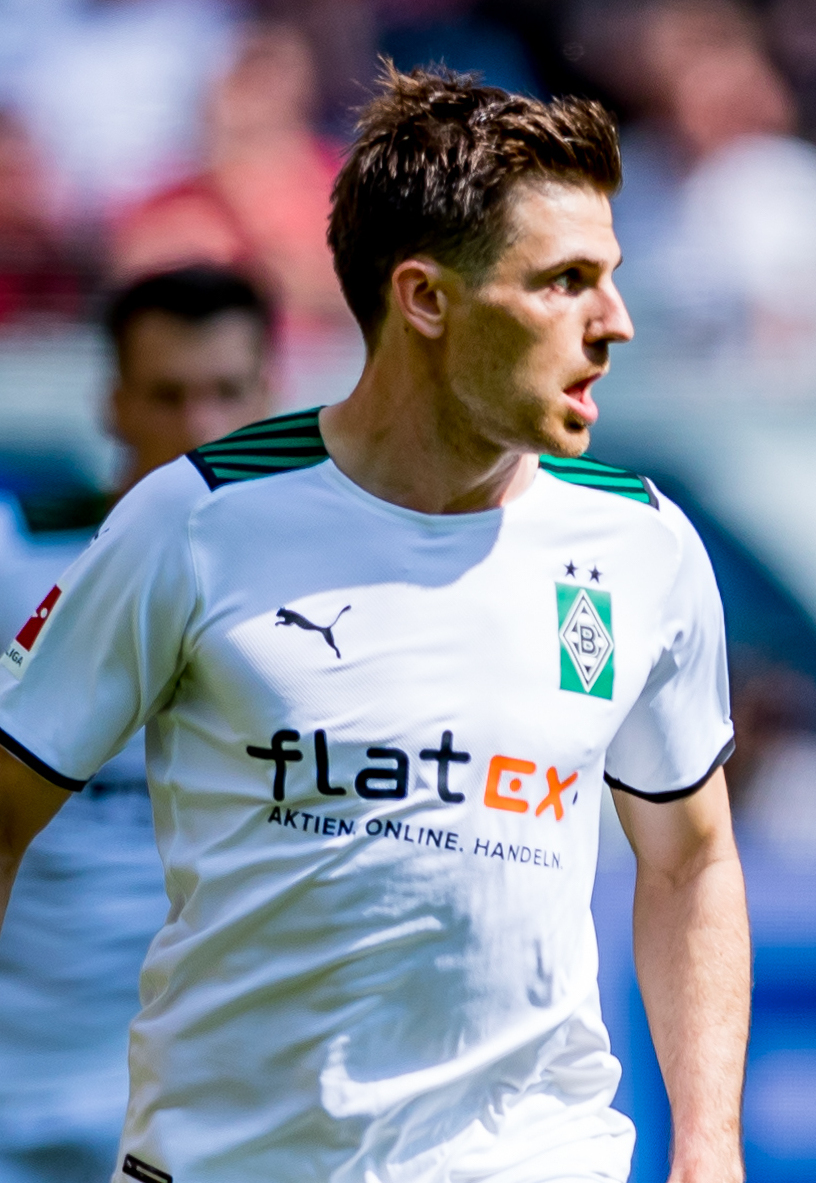
- Hofmann playing for Borussia Mönchengladbach in 2022

Personal information
- Full name: Jonas Hofmann
- Date of birth: 14 July 1992 (age 34)
- Place of birth: Heidelberg, Germany
- Height: 1.76 m (5 ft 9 in)
- Position: Right winger

Team information
- Current team: Bayer Leverkusen
- Number: 7

Youth career
- 1998–2004: FC Rot
- 2004–2011: TSG Hoffenheim

Senior career*
| Years | Team | Apps | (Gls) |
| 2011 | TSG Hoffenheim II | 5 | (2) |
| 2011–2014 | Borussia Dortmund II | 71 | (15) |
| 2012–2016 | Borussia Dortmund | 38 | (3) |
| 2014–2015 | → Mainz 05 (loan) | 10 | (3) |
| 2016–2023 | Borussia Mönchengladbach | 184 | (40) |
| 2023– | Bayer Leverkusen | 71 | (9) |

International career
| 2009–2010 | Germany U18 | 5 | (1) |
| 2013–2014 | Germany U21 | 10 | (6) |
| 2020–2023 | Germany | 23 | (4) |
- * Club domestic league appearances and goals as of 31 October 2026

Jonas Hofmann (German pronunciation: [ˈjoːnas ˈhoːfman]; born 14 July 1992) is a German professional footballer who plays as a right winger for Bundesliga club Bayer Leverkusen.

== Club career ==
=== Early career ===
Hofmann began his club career in 1998 playing at FC Rot in the municipality of St. Leon-Rot and remained there until the end of the 2003–04 season, before he moved to 1899 Hoffenheim in the 2004–2005 season. Hofmann debuted for TSG 1899 Hoffenheim second team in a 1–0 victory in April 2011 during the 2010–11 season. At the end of the 2010–2011 season playing for TSG 1899 Hoffenheim II, Hofmann made five league appearances, in which he scored two goals.

=== Borussia Dortmund ===
In the 2011–2012 season, Hofmann signed a contract for Borussia Dortmund until 30 June 2015; and inducted into Borussia Dortmund II for 2011–2012 season. Hofmann debuted for Dortmund II on 6 August in a 2–0 away victory over 1. FC Kaiserslautern II, scoring his first goal of the 2011–2012 season. On 10 September, Hofmann succeeded in scoring two goals in a 4–0 away victory over the second team of Schalke 04. In the 2012–2013 Bundesliga season, Hofmann was inducted into the Borussia Dortmund first team.

Hofmann debuted for Borussia Dortmund first team in the 2012–2013 Bundesliga season on 16 December 2012, in BVB's 3–1 away victory over TSG 1899 Hoffenheim, where he came on as a substitute in the 89th minute. On 6 April 2013, he started his first match in the Bundesliga, and he was credited with an assist to Julian Schieber to score an equalizing goal tap-in finish for a 2–2 scoreline in Dortmund's 4–2 home victory over FC Augsburg.

On 27 July 2013, Hofmann won the 2013 DFL-Supercup with Dortmund 4–2 against rivals Bayern Munich. Hofmann's first goal for Borussia Dortmund came on 18 August in a win against Eintracht Braunschweig, after coming on as a substitute in the second half. On 12 April 2014, Hofmann scored the third goal as Dortmund defeated Bayern Munich 3–0 at the Allianz Arena. On 13 August 2014, he played in the 2014 Super Cup.

During the summer transfer window of 2014, Borussia Dortmund agreed to a year-long loan deal for Hofmann that would send him to 1. FSV Mainz 05 until 30 June 2015. He was injured for most of the 2014–15 season and scored 3 goals in 12 games for Mainz, before returning to Dortmund.

On 30 July 2015, Hofmann scored his first European goal in a 1–0 win over Austrian side Wolfsberger AC in the first leg of the Europa League third qualifying round.

=== Borussia Mönchengladbach ===
It was announced on 29 December 2015 that Hofmann would join Borussia Mönchengladbach on 1 January 2016, signing a four-year deal until 2020. After only joining Gladbach during the winter break, he made his debut for the club on 23 January 2016 in a 1–3 loss to former club Dortmund.

Hofmann scored his first goal for the club in a Round of 16 match in the UEFA Europa League against fellow German side Schalke on 9 March 2017. The game ended in a 1–1 draw with Gladbach eventually going out on away goals after the two-legged tie finished 3–3.

On 18 October 2018, Hofmann scored his first ever professional hat-trick in a 4–0 league win over former club Mainz. Hofmann signed a new deal with Gladbach on 16 April 2019, extending his stay at the club until 2023. On 21 October 2020, he scored his inaugural Champions League goal in a 2–2 away draw against Inter Milan in the first match of the 2020–21 season. On 8 January 2021, he scored a brace and recorded an assist in an historic 3–2 win against Bayern Munich.

=== Bayer Leverkusen ===
On 5 July 2023, Hofmann signed for Bayer Leverkusen until 2027, after activating his release clause of €10m. On 12 August 2023, he made his debut and scored a goal in an 8–0 DFB-Pokal away victory against Teutonia Ottensen.

== International career ==
Hofmann played between the years 2009 and 2010 for the German U18 national football team and he completed his last cap for the under 18 national team with a victory on 25 March 2010 against France U18 national football team, before going on to represent the German U21 national football team.

In October 2020, he was called to represent Germany national team by Joachim Löw for the matches against Turkey, Ukraine and Switzerland. He made his debut on 7 October 2020, against Turkey in a friendly game. On 19 May 2021, he was selected to the squad for the UEFA Euro 2020. Later that year, on 5 September, he score his first goal in a 6–0 victory over Armenia during the 2022 FIFA World Cup qualification.

== Business ventures ==
Hofmann owns three Subway restaurants in the Heidelberg area.

== Career statistics ==
=== Club ===
As of match played 31 October 2026

Appearances and goals by club, season and competition
| Club | Season | League | | | DFB-Pokal | | Europe | | Other | | Total | |
| Club | Season | Division | Apps | Goals | Apps | Goals | Apps | Goals | Apps | Goals | Apps | Goals |
|---|---|---|---|---|---|---|---|---|---|---|---|---|
| TSG Hoffenheim II | 2010–11 | Regionalliga Süd | 5 | 2 | — | | — | | — | | 5 | 2 |
| Borussia Dortmund II | 2011–12 | Regionalliga West | 35 | 10 | — | | — | | — | | 35 | 10 |
| Borussia Dortmund II | 2012–13 | 3. Liga | 35 | 5 | — | | — | | — | | 35 | 5 |
| Borussia Dortmund II | 2013–14 | 3. Liga | 1 | 0 | — | | — | | — | | 1 | 0 |
| Borussia Dortmund II | Total | | 71 | 15 | — | | — | | — | | 71 | 15 |
| Borussia Dortmund | 2012–13 | Bundesliga | 3 | 0 | 0 | 0 | 0 | 0 | 0 | 0 | 3 | 0 |
| Borussia Dortmund | 2013–14 | Bundesliga | 26 | 2 | 5 | 1 | 8 (Note: Appearances in UEFA Champions League) | 0 | 0 | 0 | 39 | 3 |
| Borussia Dortmund | 2014–15 | Bundesliga | 2 | 0 | 0 | 0 | — | | 1 (Note: Appearance in DFL-Supercup) | 0 | 3 | 0 |
| Borussia Dortmund | 2015–16 | Bundesliga | 7 | 1 | 1 | 0 | 6 (Note: Appearances in UEFA Europa League) | 1 | — | | 14 | 2 |
| Borussia Dortmund | Total | | 38 | 3 | 6 | 1 | 14 | 1 | 1 | 0 | 59 | 5 |
| Mainz 05 (loan) | 2014–15 | Bundesliga | 10 | 3 | — | | — | | — | | 10 | 3 |
| Borussia Mönchengladbach | 2015–16 | Bundesliga | 8 | 0 | — | | — | | — | | 8 | 0 |
| Borussia Mönchengladbach | 2016–17 | Bundesliga | 21 | 0 | 3 | 1 | 5 (Note: Two appearances in UEFA Champions League, three appearances and one goal in UEFA Europa League) | 1 | — | | 29 | 2 |
| Borussia Mönchengladbach | 2017–18 | Bundesliga | 23 | 0 | 2 | 1 | — | | — | | 25 | 1 |
| Borussia Mönchengladbach | 2018–19 | Bundesliga | 27 | 5 | 2 | 1 | — | | — | | 29 | 6 |
| Borussia Mönchengladbach | 2019–20 | Bundesliga | 24 | 5 | 2 | 0 | 3 | 0 | — | | 29 | 5 |
| Borussia Mönchengladbach | 2020–21 | Bundesliga | 24 | 6 | 4 | 1 | 5 | 1 | — | | 33 | 8 |
| Borussia Mönchengladbach | 2021–22 | Bundesliga | 26 | 12 | 2 | 0 | — | | — | | 28 | 12 |
| Borussia Mönchengladbach | 2022–23 | Bundesliga | 31 | 12 | 2 | 2 | — | | — | | 33 | 14 |
| Borussia Mönchengladbach | Total | | 184 | 40 | 17 | 6 | 13 | 2 | — | | 214 | 48 |
| Bayer Leverkusen | 2023–24 | Bundesliga | 32 | 5 | 5 | 1 | 9 | 2 | — | | 46 | 8 |
| Bayer Leverkusen | 2024–25 | Bundesliga | 11 | 2 | 2 | 1 | 4 | 0 | 0 | 0 | 17 | 3 |
| Bayer Leverkusen | 2025–26 | Bundesliga | 23 | 2 | 3 | 1 | 2 | 0 | — | | 28 | 3 |
| Bayer Leverkusen | 2026–27 | Bundesliga | 5 | 0 | 1 | 1 | 1 | 2 | — | | 7 | 3 |
| Bayer Leverkusen | Total | | 71 | 9 | 11 | 4 | 16 | 4 | 0 | 0 | 98 | 17 |
| Career total | | | 379 | 72 | 34 | 11 | 42 | 5 | 1 | 0 | 457 | 88 |

=== International ===
Appearances and goals by national team and year
| National team | Year | Apps | Goals |
|---|---|---|---|
Germany
| Germany | 2020 | 2 | 0 |
| Germany | 2021 | 8 | 2 |
| Germany | 2022 | 9 | 2 |
| Germany | 2023 | 4 | 0 |
| Total | | 23 | 4 |

Germany score listed first, score column indicates score after each Hofmann goal.

List of international goals scored by Jonas Hofmann
| No. | Date | Venue | Opponent | Score | Result | Competition |
|---|---|---|---|---|---|---|
| 1 | 5 September 2021 | Mercedes-Benz Arena, Stuttgart, Germany | Armenia | 5–0 | 6–0 | 2022 FIFA World Cup qualification |
| 2 | 14 November 2021 | Vazgen Sargsyan Republican Stadium, Yerevan, Armenia | Armenia | 4–1 | 4–1 | 2022 FIFA World Cup qualification |
| 3 | 7 June 2022 | Allianz Arena, Munich, Germany | England | 1–0 | 1–1 | 2022–23 UEFA Nations League A |
| 4 | 11 June 2022 | Puskás Aréna, Budapest, Hungary | Hungary | 1–1 | 1–1 | 2022–23 UEFA Nations League A |

== Honours ==
Borussia Dortmund

- DFL-Supercup: 2013, 2014

Bayer Leverkusen

- Bundesliga: 2023–24
- DFB-Pokal: 2023–24
- DFL-Supercup: 2024
