= Ramy Bensebaini =

Algerian footballer (born 1995)

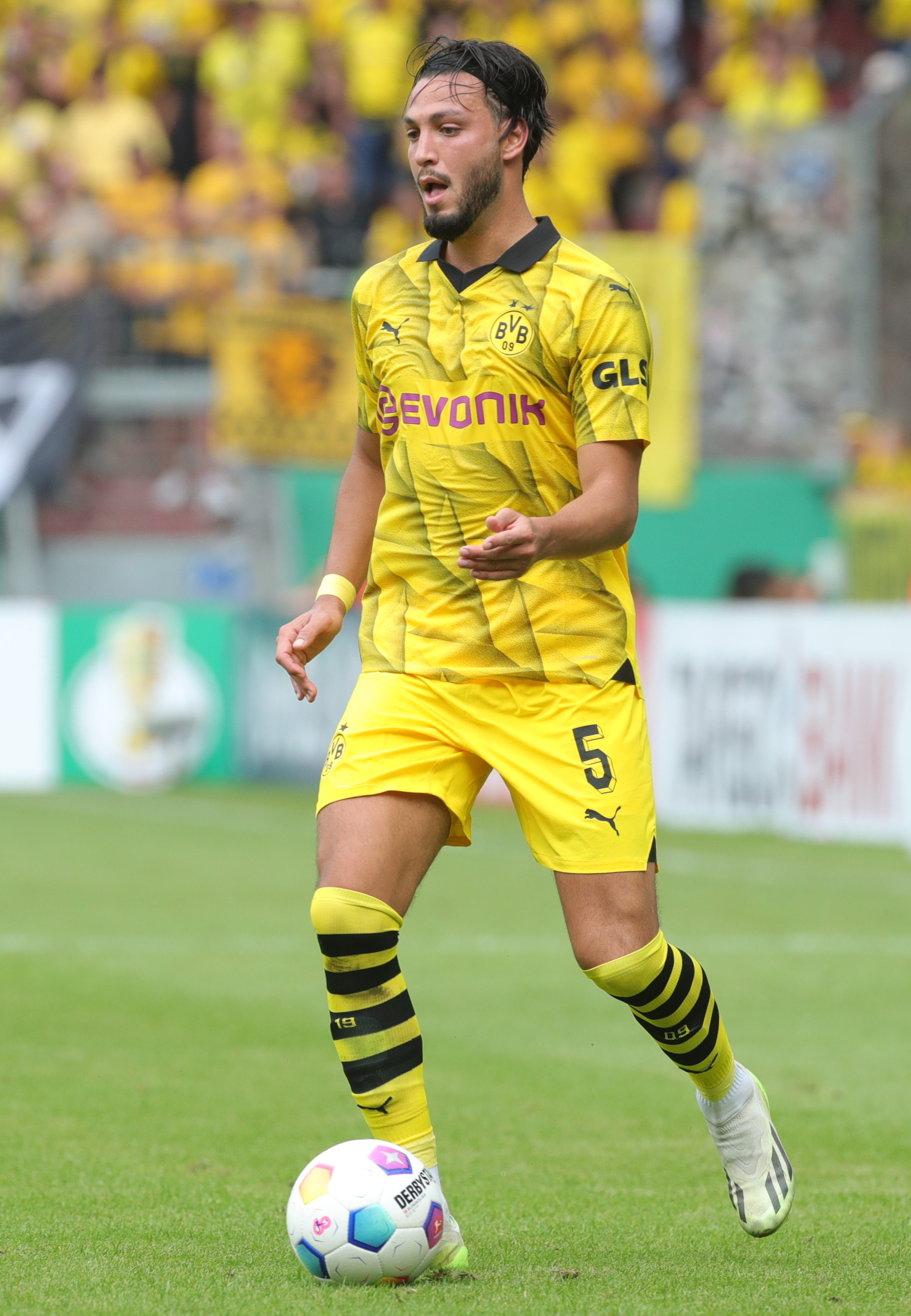
- Bensebaini playing for Borussia Dortmund in 2023

Personal information
- Full name: Amir Selmane Rami Bensebaini
- Date of birth: 16 April 1995 (age 31)
- Place of birth: Constantine, Algeria
- Height: 1.87 m (6 ft 2 in)
- Positions: Left-back; centre-back

Team information
- Current team: Borussia Dortmund
- Number: 5

Youth career
- 2008–2013: Paradou AC

Senior career*
Years	Team	Apps	(Gls)
2013–2016	Paradou AC	32	(3)
2014–2015	→ Lierse (loan)	23	(1)
2015–2016	→ Montpellier (loan)	22	(2)
2016–2019	Rennes	79	(1)
2019–2023	Borussia Mönchengladbach	95	(19)
2023–	Borussia Dortmund	73	(6)

International career^{‡}
2015	Algeria U23	3	(0)
2017–	Algeria	90	(11)
Medal record
Men's football
Representing Algeria
Africa Cup of Nations
Winner	2019
- * Club domestic league appearances and goals as of 7 November 2026 (UTC) ‡ National team caps and goals as of 14 November 2026 (UTC)

Amir Selmane Rami Bensebaini (Arabic: أمير سلمان رامي بن سبعيني; born 16 April 1995) is an Algerian professional footballer who plays as a left-back or centre-back for Bundesliga club Borussia Dortmund and captains the Algeria national team.

== Club career ==
=== Paradou AC ===
Born in Constantine, Bensebaini began his career at Paradou AC, joining the youth team in 2008 and making his senior debut in 2013. In the summer of 2013, Bensebaini went on trial with Porto and was later handed a two-week trial by English Premier League side Arsenal, during which he played in two friendlies with the under-21 team against Luton Town and Colchester.

In June 2014, Bensebaini was loaned out by Paradou for one season to Belgian Pro League club Lierse. He made his full debut on 3 August in a league match against Club Brugge, coming on as a 94th-minute substitute for Wanderson. Bensebaini made 23 league appearances during the course of the season, scoring 1 goal, but could not help Lierse avoid relegation.

In June 2015, Bensebaini was loaned out again by Paradou, this time to French club Montpellier for the 2015–16 Ligue 1 season.

=== Rennes ===
On 5 July 2016, he signed a four-year contract with Rennes.

=== Borussia Mönchengladbach ===
On 14 August 2019, Bensebaini signed a four-year deal to join Borussia Mönchengladbach for 8 million euros.

He made his debut for the team in the Bundesliga as a starter during a win against 1. FC Köln. On 10 November, he scored his first goal with his new club against Werder Bremen. In the same game, however, he was sent off. On 7 December 2019, he scored a brace in a 2–1 win against defending Bundesliga champions Bayern München. On 21 October 2020, he netted his first UEFA Champions League goal from a penalty in a 2–2 away draw against Inter Milan.

In April 2023, Gladbach's sporting director Roland Virkus confirmed that Bensebaini would depart the club at the end of the 2022–23 campaign, having chosen not to renew his contract.

=== Borussia Dortmund ===
On 5 June 2023, Bensebaïni signed a four-year contract to join Borussia Dortmund on a free transfer. On 12 August 2023, he made his official debut for the club in a 6–1 away win against Schott Mainz in the DFB Pokal.

== International career ==
In November 2015, Bensebaini received his first call-up to the Algeria national team for the 2018 FIFA World Cup qualification against Tanzania. On 7 January 2017, he made his senior debut in a 2017 Africa Cup of Nations match against Mauritania. In December 2023, Bensebaini was named in Algeria's squad for the 2023 Africa Cup of Nations.

On 31 May 2026, Bensebaini was named in Vladimir Petković's 26-man Algeria squad for the 2026 FIFA World Cup.

== Career statistics ==
=== Club ===
As of match played 7 November 2026

Appearances and goals by club, season and competition
Club	Season	League			National cup (Note: Includes Belgian Cup, Coupe de France, DFB-Pokal)		League cup (Note: Includes Coupe de la Ligue)		Europe		Other		Total	
Club	Season	Division	Apps	Goals	Apps	Goals	Apps	Goals	Apps	Goals	Apps	Goals	Apps	Goals
Lierse (loan)	2014–15	Belgian Pro League	23	1	6	1	—		—		—		29	2
Montpellier (loan)	2015–16	Ligue 1	22	2	2	0	1	0	—		—		25	2
Rennes	2016–17	Ligue 1	25	0	0	0	1	0	—		—		26	0
Rennes	2017–18	Ligue 1	29	0	1	0	3	0	—		—		33	0
Rennes	2018–19	Ligue 1	25	1	4	1	1	0	9 (Note: Appearances in UEFA Europa League)	1	—		39	3
Rennes	Total		79	1	5	1	5	0	9	1	—		98	3
Borussia Mönchengladbach	2019–20	Bundesliga	19	5	1	0	—		6	0	—		26	5
Borussia Mönchengladbach	2020–21	Bundesliga	25	4	3	1	—		5 (Note: Appearances in UEFA Champions League)	2	—		33	7
Borussia Mönchengladbach	2021–22	Bundesliga	23	4	1	2	—		—		—		24	6
Borussia Mönchengladbach	2022–23	Bundesliga	28	6	2	1	—		—		—		30	7
Borussia Mönchengladbach	Total		95	19	7	4	—		11	2	—		113	25
Borussia Dortmund	2023–24	Bundesliga	17	0	3	0	—		5	0	—		25	0
Borussia Dortmund	2024–25	Bundesliga	31	1	1	0	—		12	2	5 (Note: Appearances in FIFA Club World Cup)	0	49	3
Borussia Dortmund	2025–26	Bundesliga	21	5	2	0	—		9	2	—		32	7
Borussia Dortmund	2026–27	Bundesliga	4	0	0	0	—		3	0	1 (Note: Appearance in Franz Beckenbauer Supercup)	0	8	0
Borussia Dortmund	Total		73	6	6	0	—		29	4	6	0	114	10
Career total			292	29	26	6	7	0	48	7	6	0	379	42

=== International ===
As of match played 14 November 2026

Appearances and goals by national team and year
National team	Year	Apps	Goals
Algeria	2017	8	0
Algeria	2018	8	2
Algeria	2019	14	1
Algeria	2020	4	1
Algeria	2021	7	1
Algeria	2022	10	1
Algeria	2023	7	0
Algeria	2024	11	3
Algeria	2025	9	0
Algeria	2026	12	2
Total		90	11

Scores and results list Algeria's goal tally first.

List of international goals scored by Ramy Bensebaini
No.	Date	Venue	Opponent	Score	Result	Competition
1.	1 June 2018	Stade du 5 Juillet 1962, Algiers, Algeria	Cape Verde	1–0	2–3	Friendly
2.	12 October 2018	Mustapha Tchaker Stadium, Blida, Algeria	Benin	1–0	2–0	2019 Africa Cup of Nations qualification
3.	14 November 2019	Mustapha Tchaker Stadium, Blida, Algeria	Zambia	1–0	5–0	2021 Africa Cup of Nations qualification
4.	9 October 2020	Wörthersee Stadion, Klagenfurt, Austria	Nigeria	1–0	1–0	Friendly
5.	2 September 2021	Mustapha Tchaker Stadium, Blida, Algeria	Djibouti	3–0	8–0	2022 FIFA World Cup qualification
6.	8 June 2022	National Stadium, Dar es Salaam, Tanzania	Tanzania	1–0	2–0	2023 Africa Cup of Nations qualification
7.	5 January 2024	Stade de Kégué, Lomé, Togo	Togo	1–0	3–0	Friendly
8.	5 January 2024	Stade de Kégué, Lomé, Togo	Togo	3–0	3–0	Friendly
9.	14 October 2024	Stade de Kégué, Lomé, Togo	Togo	1–0	1–0	2025 Africa Cup of Nations qualification
10.	6 October 2026	Hocine Aït Ahmed Stadium, Tizi Ouzou, Algeria	Niger	2–1	2–1	Friendly
11.	14 November 2026	Hocine Aït Ahmed Stadium, Tizi Ouzou, Algeria	Togo	1–0	1–0	2027 Africa Cup of Nations qualification

== Honours ==
Rennes

- Coupe de France: 2018–19

Borussia Dortmund

- UEFA Champions League runner-up: 2023–24

Algeria

- Africa Cup of Nations: 2019

=== Individual ===
- Borussia Mönchengladbach Player of the Month: December 2019
- Borussia Mönchengladbach Player of the Month: March 2021
- Top-scoring defender in Europe: 2021
- Fennec d'Or: 2025
