= Torben Müsel =

German footballer (born 1999)

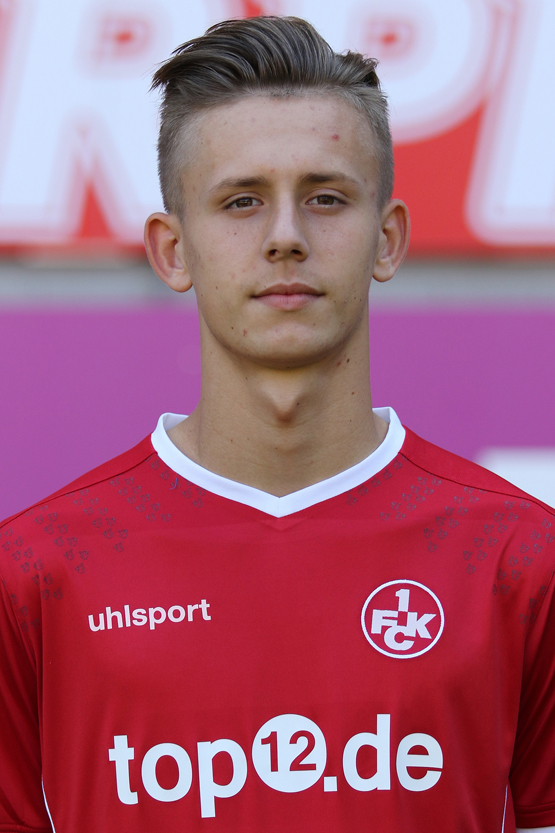
- Müsel with 1. FC Kaiserslautern in 2017

Personal information
- Date of birth: 25 July 1999 (age 27)
- Place of birth: Grünstadt, Germany
- Height: 1.85 m (6 ft 1 in)
- Positions: Attacking midfielder; forward

Team information
- Current team: 1. FC Magdeburg
- Number: 26

Youth career
- –2006: SV Obersülzen
- 2006–2017: 1. FC Kaiserslautern

Senior career*
Years	Team	Apps	(Gls)
2017–2018	1. FC Kaiserslautern	9	(0)
2018–2023	Borussia Mönchengladbach II	54	(21)
2020–2023	Borussia Mönchengladbach	2	(0)
2022	→ Eupen (loan)	9	(0)
2023–2026	Rot-Weiss Essen	120	(22)
2026–	1. FC Magdeburg	0	(0)

International career^{‡}
2016–2017	Germany U18	5	(2)
2017	Germany U19	1	(0)
2018	Germany U20	1	(0)
- * Club domestic league appearances and goals as of 20 May 2026 ‡ National team caps and goals as of 16 October 2018

Torben Müsel (born 25 July 1999) is a German professional footballer who plays as an attacking midfielder and forward for 2. Bundesliga club 1. FC Magdeburg.

== Club career ==
=== 1. FC Kaiserslautern ===
Born in Grünstadt, Müsel grew up in Obrigheim in the Rhineland-Palatinate. He started playing football in the neighbouring town with SV Obersülzen. In 2006, he moved to the youth academy of 1. FC Kaiserslautern, where he signed his first professional contract ahead of the 2017–18 season.

Müsel made his professional debut on 25 September 2017 in a 5–0 away defeat against 1. FC Union Berlin in the 2. Bundesliga. He was in the starting eleven for the first time on 16 December in the home game against 1. FC Nürnberg, which ended 1–1.

=== Borussia Mönchengladbach ===
After Kaiserslautern suffered relegated to the 3. Liga, Müsel signed with Bundesliga club Borussia Mönchengladbach for the 2018–19 season. He appeared for the reserve team during his first season and played 30 games in the Regionalliga West. Müsel made his debut in the Bundesliga on 20 June 2020 when he came on as a late substitute for Breel Embolo in the 3–1 away win over SC Paderborn. His second appearance came a year later, on 20 November 2021, in a 4–0 home win over Greuther Fürth.

On 18 January 2022, Müsel signed a contract extension with Borussia until June 2024. At the same time, Müsel was sent on a six month loan for the remainder of the 2021–22 season to Belgian First Division A club Eupen.

=== Rot-Weiss Essen ===
On 30 January 2023, Müsel signed a contract with Rot-Weiss Essen until June 2024.

=== 1. FC Magdeburg ===
On 3 June 2026, Müsel moved to 1. FC Magdeburg in 2. Bundesliga.

== International career ==
Müsel has played for Germany at youth level, and has been capped at U18, U19 and U20-level.
