= Keanan Bennetts =

English footballer (born 1999)

Personal information
- Full name: Keanan Chidozie Mbaeri Bennetts
- Date of birth: 9 March 1999 (age 27)
- Place of birth: Edgware, England
- Height: 6 ft 0 in (1.83 m)
- Position: Winger

Team information
- Current team: FC Ingolstadt
- Number: 18

Youth career
- 2013–2018: Tottenham Hotspur

Senior career*
| Years | Team | Apps | (Gls) |
| 2018–2022 | Borussia Mönchengladbach II | 33 | (2) |
| 2018–2022 | Borussia Mönchengladbach | 5 | (0) |
| 2020–2021 | → Ipswich Town (loan) | 28 | (1) |
| 2022–2023 | Darmstadt 98 | 15 | (0) |
| 2023–2024 | SV Wehen Wiesbaden | 9 | (0) |
| 2025 | Austria Klagenfurt | 11 | (0) |
| 2025–2026 | Notts County | 32 | (1) |
| 2026– | FC Ingolstadt | 0 | (0) |

International career
| 2014 | Germany U15 | 2 | (0) |
| 2014–2015 | England U16 | 3 | (0) |
| 2015 | England U17 | 5 | (0) |
| 2017 | England U19 | 1 | (0) |
- * Club domestic league appearances and goals as of 2 May 2026

Keanan Chidozie Mbaeri Bennetts (born 9 March 1999) is an English professional footballer who plays as a winger for German 3. Liga club FC Ingolstadt.

== Club career ==
=== Borussia Mönchengladbach ===
Bennetts joined Borussia Mönchengladbach from the Tottenham Hotspur academy in 2018. He made his professional debut for Borussia Mönchengladbach in the Bundesliga on 16 June 2020, coming on as a substitute in the 90th minute for Lars Stindl in the home match against VfL Wolfsburg, which finished as a 3–0 win.

==== Ipswich Town (loan) ====
On 2 October 2020, Bennetts joined Ipswich Town on a season-long loan deal. He made his debut for Ipswich as a second-half substitute in a 4–1 away win over Blackpool on 10 October. On 15 December, Bennetts scored his first goal for Ipswich in a 2–1 win over Burton Albion. Bennetts made 30 appearances during his loan spell at Ipswich, scoring once.

=== Darmstadt ===
On 21 October 2022, Bennetts joined German 2. Bundesliga club Darmstadt agreeing to a one-year contract.

=== Wehen Wiesbaden ===
On 7 July 2023, Bennetts signed with SV Wehen Wiesbaden in 2. Bundesliga.

=== Austria Klagenfurt ===
On 5 January 2025, Bennetts signed for Austrian Bundesliga club Austria Klagenfurt on a short-term contract until the end of the season.

=== Notts County ===
On 29 July 2025, Bennetts returned to England, joining League Two club Notts County on a one-year deal following a successful trial. On 28 May 2026 the club announced he was being released.

== International career ==
Bennetts made two appearances for the Germany under-15 team in 2014, having been eligible through his mother. He later switched to represent England internationally. He also declined to represent Nigeria, eligible through his father, at the 2019 FIFA U-20 World Cup.

== Personal life ==
Bennetts was born in Edgware, Greater London to a German mother from Hamburg and a Nigerian father. He is fluent in German. His brother, Jayden, is also a footballer.

== Career statistics ==
As of match played 15 December 2021

Appearances and goals by club, season and competition
| Club | Season | League | | | National Cup | | League Cup | | Other | | Total | |
| Club | Season | Division | Apps | Goals | Apps | Goals | Apps | Goals | Apps | Goals | Apps | Goals |
|---|---|---|---|---|---|---|---|---|---|---|---|---|
| Tottenham Hotspur U21 | 2017–18 | — | | | — | | — | | 3 (Note: Appearance(s) in EFL Trophy) | 0 | 3 | 0 |
| Borussia Mönchengladbach II | 2018–19 | Regionalliga West | 22 | 1 | 0 | 0 | — | | — | | 22 | 1 |
| Borussia Mönchengladbach II | 2019–20 | Regionalliga West | 2 | 1 | 0 | 0 | — | | — | | 2 | 1 |
| Borussia Mönchengladbach II | 2020–21 | Regionalliga West | 2 | 0 | 0 | 0 | — | | — | | 2 | 0 |
| Borussia Mönchengladbach II | Total | | 26 | 2 | 0 | 0 | 0 | 0 | 0 | 0 | 26 | 2 |
| Borussia Mönchengladbach | 2019–20 | Bundesliga | 1 | 0 | 0 | 0 | — | | — | | 1 | 0 |
| Borussia Mönchengladbach | 2021–22 | Bundesliga | 4 | 0 | 1 | 0 | — | | — | | 5 | 0 |
| Borussia Mönchengladbach | Total | | 5 | 0 | 1 | 0 | 0 | 0 | 0 | 0 | 6 | 0 |
| Ipswich Town (loan) | 2020–21 | League One | 28 | 1 | 1 | 0 | 0 | 0 | 1 | 0 | 30 | 1 |
| Career total | | | 59 | 3 | 2 | 0 | 0 | 0 | 4 | 0 | 65 | 3 |

== Honours ==
Notts County

- EFL League Two play-offs: 2026
