= 2016–17 Borussia Mönchengladbach season =

Borussia Mönchengladbach
2016–17 season
- President: Rolf Königs
- Manager: André Schubert (until 21 December); Dieter Hecking (from 4 January)
- Stadium: Borussia-Park
- Bundesliga: 9th
- DFB-Pokal: Semi-finals
- UEFA Champions League: Group stage
- UEFA Europa League: Round of 16
- Top goalscorer: League: Lars Stindl (11); All: Lars Stindl (18)
- Biggest win: Gladbach 6–1 Young Boys
- Biggest defeat: Man. City 4–0 Gladbach; Schalke 4–0 Gladbach; Barcelona 4–0 Gladbach
Home colours	Away colours	Third colours

The 2016–17 Borussia Mönchengladbach season was the 117th season in the club's history.

== Season overview ==
=== Background ===
Borussia Mönchengladbach finished fourth in the 2015–16 league season. This qualified them for the 2016–17 UEFA Champions League play-off round. They were eliminated 2015–16 edition of Champions League in the group stage, finishing fourth. They were also eliminated in the round of 16 of the DFB-Pokal by Werder Bremen.

== Players ==
=== Squad ===
Note: Flags indicate national team as defined under FIFA eligibility rules; some limited exceptions apply. Players may hold more than one non-FIFA nationality.

No.	Pos.	Nation	Player
1	GK	SUI	Yann Sommer
3	DF	DEN	Andreas Christensen (on loan from Chelsea)
4	DF	DEN	Jannik Vestergaard
5	MF	GER	Tobias Strobl
6	MF	GER	Christoph Kramer
7	MF	GER	Patrick Herrmann
8	MF	GER	Mahmoud Dahoud
9	FW	SUI	Josip Drmić
10	FW	BEL	Thorgan Hazard
11	FW	BRA	Raffael
13	FW	GER	Lars Stindl (Captain)
14	MF	GER	Nico Schulz
15	MF	GER	Marvin Schulz
16	MF	GUI	Ibrahima Traoré
17	DF	SWE	Oscar Wendt

No.	Pos.	Nation	Player
19	MF	USA	Fabian Johnson
20	MF	SUI	Djibril Sow
21	GK	GER	Tobias Sippel
22	MF	SVK	László Bénes
23	MF	GER	Jonas Hofmann
24	DF	GER	Tony Jantschke (Vice-captain)
25	DF	FRA	Timothée Kolodziejczak
26	MF	GER	Tsiy-William Ndenge
27	DF	GER	Julian Korb
28	FW	GER	André Hahn
29	DF	FRA	Mamadou Doucouré
30	DF	SUI	Nico Elvedi
33	GK	GER	Christofer Heimeroth
35	GK	GER	Moritz Nicolas
44	FW	GER	Ba-Muaka Simakala

=== Transfers ===
==== In ====
Note: Flags indicate national team as defined under FIFA eligibility rules; some limited exceptions apply. Players may hold more than one non-FIFA nationality.

No.	Pos.	Nation	Player
22	MF	SVK	László Bénes (from Žilina)
--	--	GER	Janis Blaswich (from Dynamo Dresden)
29	DF	FRA	Mamadou Doucouré (from Paris Saint-Germain)
9	FW	SUI	Josip Drmić (from Hamburger SV)
6	MF	GER	Christoph Kramer (from Bayer Leverkusen)
5	DF	AUT	Tobias Strobl (from 1899 Hoffenheim)
4	DF	DEN	Jannik Vestergaard (from Werder Bremen)

==== Out ====
Note: Flags indicate national team as defined under FIFA eligibility rules; some limited exceptions apply. Players may hold more than one non-FIFA nationality.

No.	Pos.	Nation	Player
--	--	GER	Nico Brandenburger (to 2nd XI)
4	DF	NED	Roel Brouwers (to Roda JC)
5	DF	AUT	Martin Hinteregger (loan return to Red Bull Salzburg)
6	MF	NOR	Håvard Nordtveit (to West Ham United)
31	FW	SWE	Branimir Hrgota (to Eintracht Frankfurt)
34	MF	SUI	Granit Xhaka (to Arsenal)
39	DF	AUT	Martin Stranzl (retired)

== Friendly matches ==
Win Draw Loss

2 July 2016 Friendly	VfL Rhede	0–15	Borussia Mönchengladbach	Rhede, Germany
15:30 CEST (UTC+2)		Report	Raffael 11'; Dahoud 25'; Simakala 35'; Hofmann 40'; Hahn 52', 58', 89', 90'; Hazard 57', 62', 78', 80'; Stindl 61', 65', 87'	Stadium: BESAGROUP Sportpark; Attendance: 4,000; Referee: Jörg Jörissen

9 July 2016 Friendly	Waldhof Mannheim	2–3	Borussia Mönchengladbach	Mannheim, Germany
16:30 CEST (UTC+2)	Sommer 9'; Ramaj 90' (pen.)	Report	Stindl 23' (pen.); Sow 36'; Hahn 75'	Stadium: Carl-Benz-Stadion; Attendance: 4,724; Referee: Tobias Fritsch

20 July 2016 Friendly	Borussia Mönchengladbach	3–1	1860 Munich	Rottach-Egern, Germany
19:30 CEST (UTC+2)	Raffael 25' (pen.); Hahn 62' (pen.); Stindl 67'	Report	Mugoša 86'	Stadium: Sportplatz Birkenmoos; Attendance: 3,500; Referee: Wolfgang Stark

2 August 2016 Friendly	Chemnitzer FC	0–1	Borussia Mönchengladbach	Chemnitz, Germany
19:30 CEST (UTC+2)		Report	Raffael 90'	Stadium: Stadion an der Gellertstraße; Attendance: 14,486; Referee: Alexander Sather

3 August 2016 Friendly	Hessen Kassel	1–6	Borussia Mönchengladbach	Kassel, Germany
18:00 CEST (UTC+2)	Korb 34'	Report	Sow 9', 18'; Raffael 31'; Herrmann 40', 56'; Hazard 81'	Stadium: Auestadion; Attendance: 9,556; Referee: Julius Martenstein

13 August 2016 Friendly	Borussia Mönchengladbach	0–0	Lazio	Mönchengladbach, Germany
15:30 CEST (UTC+2)		Report		Stadium: Stadion im Borussia-Park; Attendance: 20,347; Referee: Bastian Börner

=== Uhrencup ===
Pos	Team	Pld	W	WP	D	LP	L	GF	GA	GD	Pts	Final result
1	(Turkey) Galatasaray	2	1	0	1	0	0	4	1	+3	4	2016 Uhrencup Champions
2	(Switzerland) Zürich	2	1	0	0	0	1	2	4	−2	3	
3	(Germany) Borussia Mönchengladbach	2	0	1	0	0	1	5	5	0	2	
4	(Switzerland) Young Boys	2	0	0	1	1	0	4	5	−1	2	

Source: Uhrencup
Rules for classification: 1) Points; 2) Goal difference; 3) Goals scored; 4) Goal ratio

13 July 2016 1	Young Boys	3–3 (4–5 p)	Borussia Mönchengladbach	Grenchen, Switzerland
19:30 CEST (UTC+2)	Vilotić 22'; Bertone 51'; Sulejmani 59'	Report	Hazard 20' (pen.), 45'; Ndenge 86'	Stadium: Stadion Brühl; Attendance: 4,480; Referee: Sandro Schärer (Switzerland)
	Penalties
	Sulejmani (penalty scored); Bertone (penalty missed); Ravet (penalty scored); Kubo (penalty scored); Gajić (penalty scored)		(penalty scored) Christensen; (penalty scored) Sow; (penalty scored) Ndenge; (penalty scored) Strobl; (penalty scored) Traoré

15 July 2016 2	Borussia Mönchengladbach	1–2	Zürich	Biel, Switzerland
19:30 CEST (UTC+2)	Hahn 59'	Report	Winter 61'; Rodríguez 82' (pen.)	Stadium: Tissot Arena; Attendance: 1,952; Referee: Fedayi San (Switzerland)

=== Osnabrück Football Summer ===
Pos	Team	Pld	W	L	GF	GA	GD	Pts	Final result
1	(Wales) Cardiff City	2	2	0	5	1	+4	6	2016 Osnabrück Football Summer Champions
2	(Germany) Borussia Mönchengladbach	2	2	0	2	1	+1	6	
3	(Germany) FC St. Pauli	2	0	2	1	2	−1	0	
4	(Germany) VfL Osnabrück (H)	2	0	2	1	5	−4	0	

Source: VfL Osnabrück
Rules for classification: 1) Points; 2) Goal difference; 3) Head to head result
(H) Hosts

23 July 2016 1	FC St. Pauli	0–0 (4–5 p)	Borussia Mönchengladbach	Osnabrück, Germany
18:00 CEST (UTC+2)		Report		Stadium: Osnatel-Arena; Attendance: 5,304
	Penalties
	Bouhaddouz (penalty scored); Picault (penalty scored); Ziereis (penalty scored); Gonther (penalty scored); Buchtmann (penalty missed)		(penalty scored) Stindl; (penalty scored) Hofmann; (penalty scored) Hahn; (penalty scored) Strobl; (penalty scored) Korb
Note: The match was only 60 minutes.

23 July 2016 2	Borussia Mönchengladbach	2–1	VfL Osnabrück	Osnabrück, Germany
19:15 CEST (UTC+2)	Hazard 33', 50'	Report	Reimerink 38'	Stadium: Osnatel-Arena; Attendance: 5,304
Note: The match was only 60 minutes.

== Competitions ==
Win Draw Loss

=== Overview ===
Competition	First match	Last match	Starting round	Final position	Record							
Competition	First match	Last match	Starting round	Final position	Pld	W	D	L	GF	GA	GD	Win %
Bundesliga	27 August 2016	20 May 2017	Matchday 1	9th	34	12	9	13	45	49	−4	35.29
DFB-Pokal	20 August 2016	25 April 2017	First round	Semi-finals	5	4	1	0	8	2	+6	80.00
Champions League	16 August 2016	6 December 2016	Play-off round	Group stage	8	3	2	3	14	14	+0	37.50
Europa League	16 February 2017	16 March 2017	Round of 32	Round of 16	4	1	2	1	7	6	+1	25.00
Total					51	20	14	17	74	71	+3	39.22

Last updated: 27 May 2017
Source: Competitions

=== Bundesliga ===
==== League table ====
Pos	Team	Pld	W	D	L	GF	GA	GD	Pts	Qualification or relegation
7	SC Freiburg	34	14	6	14	42	60	−18	48	Qualification for the Europa League third qualifying round
8	Werder Bremen	34	13	6	15	61	64	−3	45	
9	Borussia Mönchengladbach	34	12	9	13	45	49	−4	45	
10	Schalke 04	34	11	10	13	45	40	+5	43	
11	Eintracht Frankfurt	34	11	9	14	36	43	−7	42	

Source: DFB
Rules for classification: 1) Points; 2) Goal difference; 3) Goals scored; 4) Head-to-head points; 5) Head-to-head goal difference; 6) Head-to-head away goals scored; 7) Away goals scored; 8) Play-off.

==== Results summary ====
Overall								Home						Away					
Pld	W	D	L	GF	GA	GD	Pts	W	D	L	GF	GA	GD	W	D	L	GF	GA	GD
34	12	9	13	45	49	−4	45	7	5	5	26	18	+8	5	4	8	19	31	−12

Last updated: 27 May 2017.
Source: Bundesliga

==== Results by round ====
Round	1	2	3	4	5	6	7	8	9	10	11	12	13	14	15	16	17	18	19	20	21	22	23	24	25	26	27	28	29	30	31	32	33	34
Ground	H	A	H	A	H	A	H	A	H	A	H	H	A	H	A	H	A	A	H	A	H	A	H	A	H	A	H	A	A	H	A	H	A	H
Result	W	L	W	D	W	L	D	L	D	L	L	D	L	W	L	L	D	W	W	W	L	W	W	L	L	D	W	W	L	L	W	D	D	D
Position	4	10	6	8	4	9	9	10	11	11	13	13	13	12	13	14	14	13	11	10	11	10	9	9	10	10	9	8	9	10	9	9	9	9

Updated to match(es) played on 27 May 2017. Source: Bundesliga
A = Away; H = Home; W = Win; D = Draw; L = Loss

==== Matches ====
27 August 2016 1	Borussia Mönchengladbach	2–1	Bayer Leverkusen	Mönchengladbach
18:30 CEST (UTC+2)	Kramer (yellow card) 40'; Hahn 45+1'; Stindl (yellow card) 74', (goal) 85'; Strobl (yellow card) 90+4'	Report	Toprak (yellow card) 64'; Bellarabi (yellow card) 74'; Wendell (yellow card) 75'; Pohjanpalo 79'	Stadium: BORUSSIA-PARK; Attendance: 52,183; Referee: Felix Brych

10 September 2016 2	SC Freiburg	3–1	Borussia Mönchengladbach	Freiburg im Breisgau
15:30 CEST (UTC+2)	Philipp 54', 85', (yellow card) 86'; Haberer (yellow card) 76'; Petersen 88' (pen.)	Report	Hazard 35'; Raffael (yellow card) 51'; Sommer (yellow card) 87'	Stadium: Schwarzwald-Stadion; Attendance: 24,000; Referee: Harm Osmers

17 September 2016 3	Borussia Mönchengladbach	4–1	Werder Bremen	Mönchengladbach
18:30 CEST (UTC+2)	Hazard 11', 17'; Raffael 21' (pen.), 41'	Report	Fritz (yellow card) 22'; Grillitsch (yellow card) 59'; Gnabry 73'; Jóhannsson (red card) 80'; Sané (yellow card) 86'	Stadium: BORUSSIA-PARK; Attendance: 54,014; Referee: Tobias Stieler

21 September 2016 4	RB Leipzig	1–1	Borussia Mönchengladbach	Leipzig
20:00 CEST (UTC+2)	Werner 6'; Gulácsi (yellow card) 73'	Report	Vestergaard (yellow card) 45'; Johnson 84'; Stindl (yellow card) 89'	Stadium: Red Bull Arena; Attendance: 42,558; Referee: Manuel Gräfe

24 September 2016 5	Borussia Mönchengladbach	2–0	FC Ingolstadt	Mönchengladbach
15:30 CEST (UTC+2)	Stindl 42'; Hahn (yellow card) 53'; Elvedi (yellow card) 65'; Wendt 76'	Report	Leckie (yellow card) 4'; Hinterseer (yellow card) 66'; Levels (yellow card) 85'	Stadium: BORUSSIA-PARK; Attendance: 50,112; Referee: Bastian Dankert

2 October 2016 6	Schalke 04	4–0	Borussia Mönchengladbach	Gelsenkirchen
17:30 CEST (UTC+2)	Choupo-Moting 52' (pen.); Embolo 56', 83'; Goretzka 58'	Report		Stadium: VELTINS-Arena; Attendance: 62,271; Referee: Sascha Stegemann

15 October 2016 7	Borussia Mönchengladbach	0–0	Hamburger SV	Mönchengladbach
15:30 CEST (UTC+2)	Stindl (yellow card) 45+1'; Kramer (yellow card) 47'	Report	Cléber (red card) 25'; Lasogga (yellow card) 39'; Spahić (yellow card) 48'; Diekmeier (yellow card) 61'; Kostić (yellow card) 69'	Stadium: BORUSSIA-PARK; Attendance: 53,636; Referee: Wolfgang Stark

22 October 2016 8	Bayern Munich	2–0	Borussia Mönchengladbach	Munich
18:30 CEST (UTC+2)	Vidal 16'; Douglas Costa 31'	Report	Kramer (yellow card) 71'	Stadium: Allianz Arena; Attendance: 75,000; Referee: Jochen Drees

28 October 2016 9	Borussia Mönchengladbach	0–0	Eintracht Frankfurt	Mönchengladbach
20:30 CEST (UTC+2)	Johnson (yellow card) 44'	Report	Huszti (yellow card) 80'; Tarashaj (yellow card) 84'	Stadium: BORUSSIA-PARK; Attendance: 54,014; Referee: Felix Zwayer

4 November 2016 10	Hertha BSC	3–0	Borussia Mönchengladbach	Berlin
20:30 CET (UTC+1)	Kalou 18', 33', 84'; Stark (yellow card) 45+1'; Mittelstädt (yellow card) 64'	Report	Kramer (yellow card) 8' (yellow-red card) 39'; Wendt (yellow card) 29'; Strobl (yellow card) 43'	Stadium: Olympiastadion Berlin; Attendance: 51,934; Referee: Tobias Stieler

19 November 2016 11	Borussia Mönchengladbach	1–2	1. FC Köln	Mönchengladbach
15:30 CET (UTC+1)	Stindl 32'; Strobl (yellow card) 87'	Report	Sørensen (yellow card) 33'; Heintz (yellow card) 35'; Lehmann (yellow card) 39'; Modeste 59'; Rudņevs (yellow card) 70'; Hector (yellow card) 87'; Risse 90+1'	Stadium: BORUSSIA-PARK; Attendance: 53,757; Referee: Manuel Gräfe

26 November 2016 12	Borussia Mönchengladbach	1–1	1899 Hoffenheim	Mönchengladbach
15:30 CET (UTC+1)	Dahoud 25'	Report	Amiri 53'; Uth (yellow card) 67'; Kadeřábek (yellow card) 77'	Stadium: BORUSSIA-PARK; Attendance: 51,086; Referee: Deniz Aytekin

3 December 2016 13	Borussia Dortmund	4–1	Borussia Mönchengladbach	Dortmund
15:30 CET (UTC+1)	Aubameyang 7', 68'; Piszczek 15', (yellow card) 36'; Dembélé 64'	Report	Raffael 6'; Strobl (yellow card) 14'	Stadium: SIGNAL IDUNA PARK; Attendance: 81,360; Referee: Marco Fritz

11 December 2016 14	Borussia Mönchengladbach	1–0	Mainz 05	Mönchengladbach
15:30 CET (UTC+1)	Hahn (yellow card) 12'; Christensen 76'; Jantschke (yellow card) 90+3'	Report	Gbamin (yellow card) 79' (yellow-red card) 90'	Stadium: BORUSSIA-PARK; Attendance: 48,037; Referee: Robert Hartmann

17 December 2016 15	FC Augsburg	1–0	Borussia Mönchengladbach	Augsburg
15:30 CET (UTC+1)	Hinteregger 75'	Report		Stadium: WWK ARENA; Attendance: 28,653; Referee: Tobias Stieler

20 December 2016 16	Borussia Mönchengladbach	1–2	VfL Wolfsburg	Mönchengladbach
20:00 CET (UTC+1)	Stindl (yellow card) 23'; Hazard 52'	Report	Caligiuri 3'; Arnold (yellow card) 12'; Bruma (yellow card) 33'; Gómez 57'	Stadium: BORUSSIA-PARK; Attendance: 47,067; Referee: Robert Kampka

21 January 2017 17	Darmstadt 98	0–0	Borussia Mönchengladbach	Darmstadt
15:30 CET (UTC+1)	Niemeyer (yellow card) 90'	Report	Jantschke (yellow card) 59'	Stadium: Jonathan-Heimes-Stadion am Böllenfalltor; Attendance: 17,400; Referee: Marco Fritz

28 January 2017 18	Bayer Leverkusen	2–3	Borussia Mönchengladbach	Leverkusen
18:30 CET (UTC+1)	Tah 31'; Hernández 34'	Report	Stindl 52', 58'; Raffael 71'	Stadium: BayArena; Attendance: 28,869; Referee: Deniz Aytekin

4 February 2017 19	Borussia Mönchengladbach	3–0	SC Freiburg	Mönchengladbach
15:30 CET (UTC+1)	Stindl (yellow card) 56', (goal) 73'; Raffael 78'; Herrmann 90+2'	Report	Günter (yellow card) 56'	Stadium: BORUSSIA-PARK; Attendance: 47,194; Referee: Felix Brych

11 February 2017 20	Werder Bremen	0–1	Borussia Mönchengladbach	Bremen
15:30 CET (UTC+1)	Delaney (yellow card) 65'; Bauer (yellow card) 73'	Report	Hazard 12'; Jantschke (yellow card) 60'; Strobl (yellow card) 80'	Stadium: Weser-Stadion; Attendance: 42,100; Referee: Benjamin Brand

19 February 2017 21	Borussia Mönchengladbach	1–2	RB Leipzig	Mönchengladbach
15:30 CET (UTC+1)	Wendt (yellow card) 14'; Stindl (yellow card) 61'; Hazard (yellow card) 67'; Kramer (yellow card) 77'; Vestergaard 81'	Report	Forsberg 31'; Halstenberg (yellow card) 37'; Keïta (yellow card) 44'; Werner 55'; Demme (yellow card) 73'	Stadium: BORUSSIA-PARK; Attendance: 51,535; Referee: Felix Zwayer

26 February 2017 22	FC Ingolstadt	0–2	Borussia Mönchengladbach	Ingolstadt
15:30 CET (UTC+1)	Jung (yellow card) 23'; Tisserand (yellow card) 63'	Report	Stindl 60'; Hahn 90+1'	Stadium: Audi Sportpark; Attendance: 15,200; Referee: Christian Dingert

4 March 2017 23	Borussia Mönchengladbach	4–2	Schalke 04	Mönchengladbach
18:30 CET (UTC+1)	Johnson 28', 64'; Wendt 67'; Raffael 76'	Report	Nastasić (yellow card) 18'; Bentaleb 38' (pen.); Goretzka 82'; Kehrer (yellow card) 85'; Huntelaar (yellow card) 88'; Di Santo (yellow card) 90+2'	Stadium: BORUSSIA-PARK; Attendance: 54,014; Referee: Manuel Gräfe

12 March 2017 24	Hamburger SV	2–1	Borussia Mönchengladbach	Hamburg
17:30 CET (UTC+1)	Papadopoulos (yellow card) 22'; Kostić 36'; Wood 80'	Report	Christensen 23'; Strobl (yellow card) 37'; Herrmann (yellow card) 51'	Stadium: Volksparkstadion; Attendance: 52,501; Referee: Deniz Aytekin

19 March 2017 25	Borussia Mönchengladbach	0–1	Bayern Munich	Mönchengladbach
17:30 CET (UTC+1)		Report	Alonso (yellow card) 56'; Müller 63'; Martínez (yellow card) 87'	Stadium: BORUSSIA-PARK; Attendance: 54,014; Referee: Tobias Stieler

1 April 2017 26	Eintracht Frankfurt	0–0	Borussia Mönchengladbach	Frankfurt
18:30 CEST (UTC+2)	Vallejo (yellow card) 21'; Mascarell (yellow card) 43'; Chandler (yellow card) 83'; Hrgota (yellow card) 89'	Report	Strobl (yellow card) 56' (yellow-red card) 85'; Sippel (yellow card) 77'; Wendt (yellow card) 78'	Stadium: Commerzbank-Arena; Attendance: 51,500; Referee: Harm Osmers
Note: Tobias Sippel was booked on the substitutes' bench, despite not playing any part in the match.

5 April 2017 27	Borussia Mönchengladbach	1–0	Hertha BSC	Mönchengladbach
20:00 CEST (UTC+2)	Bénes 16'; Hazard (yellow card) 89'	Report	Torunarigha (yellow card) 68'	Stadium: BORUSSIA-PARK; Attendance: 44,347; Referee: Günter Perl

8 April 2017 28	1. FC Köln	2–3	Borussia Mönchengladbach	Cologne
15:30 CEST (UTC+2)	Clemens 18'; Heintz (yellow card) 56'; Modeste 58'; Klünter (yellow card) 82'	Report	Vestergaard 13'; Traoré 55'; Dahoud (yellow card) 58'; Stindl 80'; Hazard (yellow card) 89'	Stadium: RheinEnergieSTADION; Attendance: 50,000; Referee: Felix Brych

15 April 2017 29	1899 Hoffenheim	5–3	Borussia Mönchengladbach	Sinsheim
15:30 CEST (UTC+2)	Szalai 9', 24'; Hübner (yellow card) 30'; Demirbay 58', 89'; Vogt (yellow card) 64'; Uth 75'	Report	Stindl (yellow card) 26', (goal) 35'; Vestergaard 31'; Elvedi (yellow card) 45+1'; Christensen (yellow card) 48'; Dahoud (yellow card) 63', (goal) 78'	Stadium: WIRSOL Rhein-Neckar-Arena; Attendance: 30,150; Referee: Christian Dingert

22 April 2017 30	Borussia Mönchengladbach	2–3	Borussia Dortmund	Mönchengladbach
18:30 CEST (UTC+2)	Dahoud (yellow card) 9'; Stindl 43'; Schmelzer 48' (o.g.); Elvedi (yellow card) 71'	Report	Reus 10' (pen.); Castro (yellow card) 54'; Aubameyang 59'; Merino (yellow card) 79'; Guerreiro 87'; Bürki (yellow card) 90+3'	Stadium: BORUSSIA-PARK; Attendance: 54,014; Referee: Wolfgang Stark

29 April 2017 31	Mainz 05	1–2	Borussia Mönchengladbach	Mainz
15:30 CEST (UTC+2)	Muto (yellow card) 66', (goal) 89'	Report	Stindl 31'; N. Schulz 46'; Elvedi (yellow card) 87'	Stadium: OPEL ARENA; Attendance: 34,000; Referee: Sascha Stegemann

6 May 2017 32	Borussia Mönchengladbach	1–1	FC Augsburg	Mönchengladbach
15:30 CEST (UTC+2)	Stindl (yellow card) 78'; Hahn (yellow card) 90', (goal) 90+4'	Report	Finnbogason (yellow card) 23', (goal) 57'; Kohr (yellow card) 87'	Stadium: BORUSSIA-PARK; Attendance: 52,362; Referee: Bastian Dankert

13 May 2017 33	VfL Wolfsburg	1–1	Borussia Mönchengladbach	Wolfsburg
15:30 CEST (UTC+2)	Bazoer (yellow card) 45'; Horn (yellow card) 49'; Gómez 58'; Osimhen (yellow card) 89'	Report	Vestergaard 24'; N. Schulz (yellow card) 53'	Stadium: VOLKSWAGEN ARENA; Attendance: 28,721; Referee: Christian Dingert

20 May 2017 34	Borussia Mönchengladbach	2–2	Darmstadt 98	Mönchengladbach
15:30 CEST (UTC+2)	Kramer (yellow card) 12'; Hazard 50'; Raffael 65'	Report	Schipplock 62'; Heller 90'	Stadium: BORUSSIA-PARK; Attendance: 54,014; Referee: Wolfgang Stark

=== DFB-Pokal ===
20 August 2016 First round	SV Drochtersen/Assel	0–1	Borussia Mönchengladbach	Drochtersen
15:30 CEST (UTC+2)	Nagel (yellow card) 70'	Report	Korb 55'	Stadium: Kehdinger Stadion; Attendance: 7,154; Referee: Matthias Jöllenbeck

25 October 2016 Second round	Borussia Mönchengladbach	2–0	VfB Stuttgart	Mönchengladbach
20:45 CEST (UTC+2)	Johnson 31'; Stindl (yellow card) 62', (goal) 84'	Report	Insúa (yellow card) 39'	Stadium: BORUSSIA-PARK; Attendance: 40,452; Referee: Günter Perl

7 February 2017 Round of 16	Greuther Fürth	0–2	Borussia Mönchengladbach	Fürth
20:45 CET (UTC+1)	Pintér (red card) 18'; Caligiuri (yellow card) 82'	Report	Wendt 12'; Hazard 36' (pen.); Bénes (yellow card) 87'	Stadium: Sportpark Ronhof Thomas Sommer; Attendance: 12,336; Referee: Bastian Dankert

1 March 2017 Quarter-finals	Hamburger SV	1–2	Borussia Mönchengladbach	Hamburg
18:40 CET (UTC+1)	Wood 90+2'	Report	Stindl 53' (pen.); Raffael 61' (pen.); Herrmann (yellow card) 83'	Stadium: Volksparkstadion; Attendance: 53,249; Referee: Marco Fritz
Note: The match was originally scheduled to start at 18:30, but was delayed 10 minutes due to a traffic jam around the stadium.

25 April 2017 Semi-finals	Borussia Mönchengladbach	1–1 (a.e.t.) (6–7 p)	Eintracht Frankfurt	Mönchengladbach
20:45 CEST (UTC+2)	Wendt (yellow card) 24'; Hofmann 45+2'; N. Schulz (yellow card) 90'; Hahn (yellow card) 90+3'	Report	Tawatha 15'; Fabián (yellow card) 60'; Varela (yellow card) 80'	Stadium: BORUSSIA-PARK; Attendance: 54,014; Referee: Deniz Aytekin
	Penalties
	Stindl (penalty scored); Herrmann (penalty scored); Hahn (penalty scored); Strobl (penalty scored); Bénes (penalty scored); Vestergaard (penalty scored); Christensen (penalty missed); Sow (penalty missed)		(penalty scored) Oczipka; (penalty scored) Hector; (penalty scored) Gaćinović; (penalty scored) Fabián; (penalty scored) Russ; (penalty scored) Seferovic; (penalty missed) Varela; (penalty scored) Hrgota

=== UEFA Champions League ===
==== Play-off round ====
16 August 2016 First leg	Young Boys (Switzerland)	1–3	(Germany) Borussia Mönchengladbach	Bern, Switzerland
20:45 CEST (UTC+2)	Rochat (yellow card) 39'; Sulejmani 56'	Report	Raffael 11'; Traoré (yellow card) 29'; Hazard (yellow card) 40'; Hahn 67'; Rochat 69' (o.g.)	Stadium: Stade de Suisse; Attendance: 30,224; Referee: Nicola Rizzoli (Italy)

24 August 2016 Second leg	Borussia Mönchengladbach (Germany)	6–1 (9–2 agg.)	(Switzerland) Young Boys	Mönchengladbach, Germany
20:45 CEST (UTC+2)	Hazard 9', 64', 84'; Raffael 33', 40', 77'	Report	Lecjaks (yellow card) 39'; Zakaria (yellow card) 45+1'; Frey (yellow card) 62'; Ravet 79'	Stadium: BORUSSIA-PARK; Attendance: 43,302; Referee: Andre Marriner (England)

==== Group stage ====
Pos	Team	Pld	W	D	L	GF	GA	GD	Pts	Qualification	BAR	MCI	BMG	CEL
1	(Spain) Barcelona	6	5	0	1	20	4	+16	15	Advance to knockout phase	—	4–0	4–0	7–0
2	(England) Manchester City	6	2	3	1	12	10	+2	9	Advance to knockout phase	3–1	—	4–0	1–1
3	(Germany) Borussia Mönchengladbach	6	1	2	3	5	12	−7	5	Transfer to Europa League	1–2	1–1	—	1–1
4	(Scotland) Celtic	6	0	3	3	5	16	−11	3		0–2	3–3	0–2	—

Source: UEFA
Rules for classification: Group stage tiebreakers

14 September 2016 1	Manchester City (England)	4–0	(Germany) Borussia Mönchengladbach	Manchester, England
19:45 BST (UTC+1); 20:45 CEST (UTC+2)	Agüero 9', 28' (pen.), 77'; Otamendi (yellow card) 48'; Iheanacho 90+1'	Report	Kramer (yellow card) 27'	Stadium: Etihad Stadium; Attendance: 30,270; Referee: Björn Kuipers (Netherlands)
Note: The match, originally scheduled for 13 September 2016, 20:45 CEST, was postponed and rescheduled for the following day due to adverse weather conditions.

28 September 2016 2	Borussia Mönchengladbach (Germany)	1–2	(Spain) Barcelona	Mönchengladbach, Germany
20:45 CEST (UTC+2)	Hazard 34'	Report	Mascherano (yellow card) 63'; Turan 65'; Piqué (yellow card) 70', (goal) 74'; Neymar (yellow card) 90+1'	Stadium: BORUSSIA-PARK; Attendance: 46,283; Referee: Damir Skomina (Slovenia)

19 October 2016 3	Celtic (Scotland)	0–2	(Germany) Borussia Mönchengladbach	Glasgow, Scotland
19:45 BST (UTC+1); 20:45 CEST (UTC+2)	Tierney (yellow card) 35'	Report	Kramer (yellow card) 13'; Stindl 57'; Hahn 77'	Stadium: Celtic Park; Attendance: 57,814; Referee: Anastasios Sidiropoulos (Greece)

1 November 2016 4	Borussia Mönchengladbach (Germany)	1–1	(Scotland) Celtic	Mönchengladbach, Germany
20:45 CET (UTC+1)	Stindl 32'; Korb (red card) 75'; Herrmann (yellow card) 78'; Kramer (yellow card) 88'	Report	Dembélé 76' (pen.); Izaguirre (yellow card) 78'	Stadium: BORUSSIA-PARK; Attendance: 46,283; Referee: Jorge Sousa (Portugal)

23 November 2016 5	Borussia Mönchengladbach (Germany)	1–1	(England) Manchester City	Mönchengladbach, Germany
20:45 CET (UTC+1)	Stindl (yellow card) 20' (yellow-red card) 51'; Raffael 23', (yellow card) 71'; Dahoud (yellow card) 49'; Jantschke (yellow card) 69'	Report	Fernandinho (yellow card) 43' (yellow-red card) 63'; Silva 45+1'	Stadium: BORUSSIA-PARK; Attendance: 45,921; Referee: Cüneyt Çakır (Turkey)

6 December 2016 6	Barcelona (Spain)	4–0	(Germany) Borussia Mönchengladbach	Barcelona, Spain
20:45 CET (UTC+1)	Messi 16'; Turan 50', 53', 67'	Report	Dahoud (yellow card) 55'	Stadium: Camp Nou; Attendance: 67,157; Referee: Sergei Karasev (Russia)

=== UEFA Europa League ===
==== Knockout phase ====
===== Round of 32 =====
16 February 2017 First leg	Borussia Mönchengladbach (Germany)	0–1	(Italy) Fiorentina	Mönchengladbach, Germany
19:00 CET (UTC+1)	Kramer (yellow card) 90+2'	Report	Bernardeschi 44', (yellow card) 59'; Badelj (yellow card) 64'	Stadium: BORUSSIA-PARK; Attendance: 46,283; Referee: Jesús Gil Manzano (Spain)

23 February 2017 Second leg	Fiorentina (Italy)	2–4 (3–4 agg.)	(Germany) Borussia Mönchengladbach	Florence, Italy
21:05 CET (UTC+1)	Kalinić 16'; Vecino (yellow card) 23'; Valero 29'; Olivera (yellow card) 45'	Report	Stindl 44' (pen.), 47', 55', (yellow card) 76'; Christensen 60'; Kramer (yellow card) 67'	Stadium: Stadio Artemio Franchi; Attendance: 24,712; Referee: Artur Soares Dias (Portugal)

===== Round of 16 =====
9 March 2017 First leg	Schalke 04 (Germany)	1–1	(Germany) Borussia Mönchengladbach	Gelsenkirchen, Germany
21:05 CET (UTC+1)	Kehrer (yellow card) 10'; Geis (yellow card) 14'; Burgstaller 25'	Report	Strobl (yellow card) 3'; Hofmann 15'; Jantschke (yellow card) 38'	Stadium: VELTINS-Arena; Attendance: 52,412; Referee: Björn Kuipers (Netherlands)

16 March 2017 Second leg	Borussia Mönchengladbach (Germany)	2–2 (3–3a agg.)	(Germany) Schalke 04	Mönchengladbach, Germany
21:05 CET (UTC+1)	Christensen 26'; Raffael (yellow card) 29'; Dahoud 45+2'; Jantschke (yellow card) 53'; Vestergaard (yellow card) 59'; Wendt (yellow card) 90+3'	Report	Goretzka 54'; Bentaleb 68' (pen.); Caligiuri (yellow card) 77'; Choupo-Moting (yellow card) 89'; Fährmann (yellow card) 90+1'	Stadium: BORUSSIA-PARK; Attendance: 46,283; Referee: Mark Clattenburg (England)

== Statistics ==
=== Appearances and goals ===
No.	Pos	Nat	Player	Total		Bundesliga		DFB-Pokal		Champions League		Europa League	
No.	Pos	Nat	Player	Apps	Goals	Apps	Goals	Apps	Goals	Apps	Goals	Apps	Goals
Goalkeepers
1	GK	(Switzerland) SUI	Yann Sommer	50	0	34	0	4	0	8	0	4	0
21	GK	(Germany) GER	Tobias Sippel	1	0	0	0	1	0	0	0	0	0
33	GK	(Germany) GER	Christofer Heimeroth	0	0	0	0	0	0	0	0	0	0
35	GK	(Germany) GER	Moritz Nicolas	0	0	0	0	0	0	0	0	0	0
Defenders
3	DF	(Denmark) DEN	Andreas Christensen	43	4	31	2	3	0	6	0	3	2
4	DF	(Denmark) DEN	Jannik Vestergaard	49	4	29+5	4	5	0	4+2	0	4	0
15	DF	(Germany) GER	Marvin Schulz	0	0	0	0	0	0	0	0	0	0
17	DF	(Sweden) SWE	Oscar Wendt	43	3	28	2	4+1	1	6	0	4	0
24	DF	(Germany) GER	Tony Jantschke	35	0	17+5	0	4	0	4+1	0	4	0
25	DF	(France) FRA	Timothée Kolodziejczak	2	0	0+1	0	0	0	0	0	1	0
27	DF	(Germany) GER	Julian Korb	21	1	7+5	0	1+1	1	4+2	0	0+1	0
29	DF	(France) FRA	Mamadou Doucouré	0	0	0	0	0	0	0	0	0	0
30	DF	(Switzerland) SUI	Nico Elvedi	35	0	23+2	0	2	0	8	0	0	0
Midfielders
5	MF	(Germany) GER	Tobias Strobl	37	0	18+5	0	2+2	0	7	0	1+2	0
6	MF	(Germany) GER	Christoph Kramer	38	0	23+1	0	4	0	6+1	0	3	0
7	MF	(Germany) GER	Patrick Herrmann	31	1	9+9	1	3+2	0	1+3	0	3+1	0
8	MF	(Germany) GER	Mahmoud Dahoud	42	3	26+2	2	5	0	4+1	0	4	1
14	MF	(Germany) GER	Nico Schulz	16	1	4+8	1	0+1	0	1+1	0	0+1	0
16	MF	(Guinea) GUI	Ibrahima Traoré	21	1	9+5	1	2	0	4+1	0	0	0
19	MF	(United States) USA	Fabian Johnson	35	4	12+9	3	2+1	1	4+3	0	3+1	0
20	MF	(Switzerland) SUI	Djibril Sow	3	0	0+1	0	0+2	0	0	0	0	0
22	MF	(Slovakia) SVK	László Bénes	10	1	3+5	1	0+2	0	0	0	0	0
23	MF	(Germany) GER	Jonas Hofmann	29	2	16+5	0	3	1	1+1	0	2+1	1
26	MF	(Germany) GER	Tsiy-William Ndenge	0	0	0	0	0	0	0	0	0	0
Forwards
9	FW	(Switzerland) SUI	Josip Drmić	16	0	2+10	0	1	0	0	0	1+2	0
10	FW	(Belgium) BEL	Thorgan Hazard	33	11	18+5	6	1+1	1	5+1	4	2	0
11	FW	(Brazil) BRA	Raffael	31	13	18+2	7	1+1	1	5+2	5	2	0
13	FW	(Germany) GER	Lars Stindl	44	18	29+1	11	4	2	7	2	3	3
28	FW	(Germany) GER	André Hahn	45	5	18+12	3	3+2	0	4+3	2	0+3	0
44	FW	(Germany) GER	Ba-Muaka Simakala	1	0	0+1	0	0	0	0	0	0	0
Players transferred out during the season
18	DF	(Spain) ESP	Álvaro Domínguez	0	0	0	0	0	0	0	0	0	0

Last updated: 20 May 2017
Source: Competitions

=== Goalscorers ===
Rank	No.	Pos	Nat	Name	Bundesliga	DFB-Pokal	UEFA CL	UEFA EL	Total
1	13	FW	(Germany)	Lars Stindl	11	2	2	3	18
2	11	FW	(Brazil)	Raffael	7	1	5	0	13
3	10	FW	(Belgium)	Thorgan Hazard	6	1	4	0	11
4	28	FW	(Germany)	André Hahn	3	0	2	0	5
5	3	DF	(Denmark)	Andreas Christensen	2	0	0	2	4
5	4	DF	(Denmark)	Jannik Vestergaard	4	0	0	0	4
5	19	MF	(United States)	Fabian Johnson	3	1	0	0	4
8	8	MF	(Germany)	Mahmoud Dahoud	2	0	0	1	3
8	17	DF	(Sweden)	Oscar Wendt	3	0	0	0	3
8	23	MF	(Germany)	Jonas Hofmann	0	1	0	1	2
11	7	MF	(Germany)	Patrick Herrmann	1	0	0	0	1
11	14	MF	(Germany)	Nico Schulz	1	0	0	0	1
11	16	MF	(Guinea)	Ibrahima Traoré	1	0	0	0	1
11	22	MF	(Slovakia)	László Bénes	1	0	0	0	1
11	27	DF	(Germany)	Julian Korb	0	1	0	0	1
Own goal					1	0	1	0	2
Totals					45	8	14	7	74

Last updated: 20 May 2017

=== Clean sheets ===
Rank	No.	Pos	Nat	Name	Bundesliga	DFB-Pokal	UEFA CL	UEFA EL	Total
1	1	GK	(Switzerland)	Yann Sommer	10	2	1	0	13
2	21	GK	(Germany)	Tobias Sippel	0	1	0	0	1
Totals					10	3	1	0	14

Last updated: 5 April 2017

=== Disciplinary record ===
No.	Pos	Nat	Player	Bundesliga			DFB-Pokal			UEFA CL			UEFA EL			Total		
No.	Pos	Nat	Player	Yellow card	(yellow card) (yellow-red card)	Red card	Yellow card	(yellow card) (yellow-red card)	Red card	Yellow card	(yellow card) (yellow-red card)	Red card	Yellow card	(yellow card) (yellow-red card)	Red card	Yellow card	(yellow card) (yellow-red card)	Red card
1	GK	(Switzerland)	Yann Sommer	1	0	0	0	0	0	0	0	0	0	0	0	1	0	0
3	DF	(Denmark)	Andreas Christensen	1	0	0	0	0	0	0	0	0	0	0	0	1	0	0
4	DF	(Denmark)	Jannik Vestergaard	1	0	0	0	0	0	0	0	0	1	0	0	2	0	0
5	MF	(Germany)	Tobias Strobl	6	1	0	0	0	0	0	0	0	1	0	0	7	1	0
6	MF	(Germany)	Christoph Kramer	5	1	0	0	0	0	3	0	0	2	0	0	10	1	0
7	MF	(Germany)	Patrick Herrmann	1	0	0	1	0	0	1	0	0	0	0	0	3	0	0
8	MF	(Germany)	Mahmoud Dahoud	3	0	0	0	0	0	2	0	0	0	0	0	5	0	0
10	FW	(Belgium)	Thorgan Hazard	3	0	0	0	0	0	1	0	0	0	0	0	4	0	0
11	FW	(Brazil)	Raffael	1	0	0	0	0	0	1	0	0	1	0	0	3	0	0
13	FW	(Germany)	Lars Stindl	8	0	0	1	0	0	0	1	0	1	0	0	10	1	0
14	MF	(Germany)	Nico Schulz	1	0	0	1	0	0	0	0	0	0	0	0	2	0	0
16	MF	(Guinea)	Ibrahima Traoré	0	0	0	0	0	0	1	0	0	0	0	0	1	0	0
17	DF	(Sweden)	Oscar Wendt	3	0	0	1	0	0	0	0	0	1	0	0	5	0	0
19	MF	(United States)	Fabian Johnson	1	0	0	0	0	0	0	0	0	0	0	0	1	0	0
21	GK	(Germany)	Tobias Sippel	1	0	0	0	0	0	0	0	0	0	0	0	1	0	0
22	MF	(Slovakia)	László Bénes	0	0	0	1	0	0	0	0	0	0	0	0	1	0	0
24	DF	(Germany)	Tony Jantschke	3	0	0	0	0	0	1	0	0	2	0	0	6	0	0
27	DF	(Germany)	Julian Korb	0	0	0	0	0	0	0	0	1	0	0	0	0	0	1
28	FW	(Germany)	André Hahn	3	0	0	1	0	0	0	0	0	0	0	0	4	0	0
30	DF	(Switzerland)	Nico Elvedi	4	0	0	0	0	0	0	0	0	0	0	0	4	0	0
Totals				45	2	0	6	0	0	10	1	1	9	0	0	70	3	1

Last updated: 20 May 2017
