= 2017–18 Borussia Mönchengladbach season =

Borussia Mönchengladbach
2017–18 season
- President: Rolf Königs
- Manager: Dieter Hecking
- Stadium: Borussia-Park
- Bundesliga: 9th
- DFB-Pokal: Round of 16
- Top goalscorer: League: Thorgan Hazard (10); All: Thorgan Hazard (11)
- Biggest win: Gladbach 3–0 Wolfsburg
- Biggest defeat: Dortmund 6–1 Gladbach
Home colours	Away colours	Third colours

The 2017–18 Borussia Mönchengladbach season was the 118th season in the football club's history and 10th consecutive and 50th overall season in the top flight of German football, the Bundesliga, having been promoted from the 2. Bundesliga in 2008. In addition to the domestic league, Borussia Mönchengladbach also participated in this season's edition of the domestic cup, the DFB-Pokal. This was the 14th season for Mönchengladbach in the Borussia-Park, located in Mönchengladbach, North Rhine-Westphalia, Germany. The season covered a period from 1 July 2017 to 30 June 2018.

== Players ==
=== Squad information ===
As of 24 February 2018

Note: Flags indicate national team as defined under FIFA eligibility rules; some limited exceptions apply. Players may hold more than one non-FIFA nationality.

No.	Pos.	Nation	Player
1	GK	SUI	Yann Sommer
2	DF	ENG	Mandela Egbo
3	DF	ENG	Reece Oxford (on loan from West Ham United)
4	DF	DEN	Jannik Vestergaard
5	MF	GER	Tobias Strobl
6	MF	GER	Christoph Kramer
7	MF	GER	Patrick Herrmann
8	MF	SUI	Denis Zakaria
10	FW	BEL	Thorgan Hazard
11	FW	BRA	Raffael
13	FW	GER	Lars Stindl (Captain)
16	MF	GUI	Ibrahima Traoré
17	DF	SWE	Oscar Wendt (Vice-captain)
18	FW	SUI	Josip Drmić
19	MF	USA	Fabian Johnson

No.	Pos.	Nation	Player
20	FW	PAR	Julio Villalba
21	GK	GER	Tobias Sippel
22	MF	SVK	László Bénes
23	MF	GER	Jonas Hofmann
24	DF	GER	Tony Jantschke
26	FW	PAR	Raúl Bobadilla
27	MF	FRA	Michaël Cuisance
28	DF	GER	Matthias Ginter
29	DF	FRA	Mamadou Doucouré
30	DF	SUI	Nico Elvedi
32	MF	ITA	Vincenzo Grifo
35	GK	GER	Moritz Nicolas
38	DF	GER	Marcel Benger
42	DF	GER	Florian Mayer

== Transfers ==
=== In ===
No.	Pos	Player	From	Type	Window	Ends	Fee	Source
3	DF	(England) Reece Oxford	(England) West Ham United	Loan	Summer	2018	Free	
8	MF	(Switzerland) Denis Zakaria	(Switzerland) Young Boys	Transfer	Summer	2022	€12,000,000	
20	FW	(Paraguay) Julio Villalba	(Paraguay) Cerro Porteño	Loan return	Summer		Free	
26	FW	(Paraguay) Raúl Bobadilla	FC Augsburg	Transfer	Summer	2019	€2,000,000	
27	MF	(France) Michaël Cuisance	(France) Nancy	Transfer	Summer	2022	€250,000	
28	DF	(Germany) Matthias Ginter	Borussia Dortmund	Transfer	Summer	2021	€17,000,000	
32	MF	(Italy) Vincenzo Grifo	SC Freiburg	Transfer	Summer	2021	€6,000,000	
39	FW	(Australia) Kwame Yeboah	Borussia Mönchengladbach II	Transfer	Summer	2019	Free	
—	MF	(Germany) Florian Neuhaus	1860 Munich	Transfer	Summer	2022	Free	

=== Out ===
No.	Pos	Player	To	Type	Window	Fee	Source
3	DF	(Denmark) Andreas Christensen	(England) Chelsea	Loan return	Summer	Free	
8	MF	(Germany) Mahmoud Dahoud	Borussia Dortmund	Transfer	Summer	€12,000,000	
14	DF	(Germany) Nico Schulz	1899 Hoffenheim	Transfer	Summer	€3,000,000	
20	MF	(Switzerland) Djibril Sow	(Switzerland) Young Boys	Transfer	Summer	€2,000,000	
26	MF	(Germany) Tsiy William Ndenge	(Netherlands) Roda JC	Loan	Summer	Free	
27	DF	(Germany) Julian Korb	Hannover 96	Transfer	Summer	€3,000,000	
28	FW	(Germany) André Hahn	Hamburger SV	Transfer	Summer	€6,000,000	
—	MF	(Germany) Florian Neuhaus	Fortuna Düsseldorf	Loan	Summer	€80,000	
—	MF	(Germany) Marvin Schulz	(Switzerland) FC Luzern	Transfer	Summer	Free	

== Competitions ==
Win Draw Loss

=== Overview ===
Competition	First match	Last match	Starting round	Final position	Record							
Competition	First match	Last match	Starting round	Final position	Pld	W	D	L	GF	GA	GD	Win %
Bundesliga	20 August 2017	12 May 2018	Matchday 1	9th	34	13	8	13	47	52	−5	38.24
DFB-Pokal	11 August 2017	20 December 2017	First round	Round of 16	3	2	0	1	3	2	+1	66.67
Total					37	15	8	14	50	54	−4	40.54

Last updated: 21 May 2018
Source: Competitions

=== Bundesliga ===
==== League table ====
Pos	Team	Pld	W	D	L	GF	GA	GD	Pts	Qualification or relegation
7	VfB Stuttgart	34	15	6	13	36	36	0	51	
8	Eintracht Frankfurt	34	14	7	13	45	45	0	49	Qualification for the Europa League group stage (Note: Eintracht Frankfurt qualified for the Europa League group stage by winning the 2017–18 DFB-Pokal.)
9	Borussia Mönchengladbach	34	13	8	13	47	52	−5	47	
10	Hertha BSC	34	10	13	11	43	46	−3	43	
11	Werder Bremen	34	10	12	12	37	40	−3	42	

Source: DFB
Rules for classification: 1) Points; 2) Goal difference; 3) Goals scored; 4) Head-to-head results; 5) Head-to-head away goals scored; 6) Away goals scored; 7) Play-off.

==== Results summary ====
Overall								Home						Away					
Pld	W	D	L	GF	GA	GD	Pts	W	D	L	GF	GA	GD	W	D	L	GF	GA	GD
34	13	8	13	47	52	−5	47	9	4	4	28	20	+8	4	4	9	19	32	−13

Last updated: 21 May 2018.
Source: Bundesliga

==== Results by round ====
Round	1	2	3	4	5	6	7	8	9	10	11	12	13	14	15	16	17	18	19	20	21	22	23	24	25	26	27	28	29	30	31	32	33	34
Ground	H	A	H	A	H	A	H	A	H	A	H	A	H	A	H	A	H	A	H	A	H	A	H	A	H	A	H	A	H	A	H	A	H	A
Result	W	D	L	D	W	L	W	W	L	W	D	W	W	L	D	L	W	L	W	L	L	L	L	W	D	L	D	D	W	L	W	D	W	L
Position	5	5	9	10	7	9	7	5	8	6	8	4	4	4	4	8	6	6	5	7	8	10	10	7	8	9	9	9	8	8	8	9	9	9

Updated to match(es) played on 21 May 2018. Source: Bundesliga
A = Away; H = Home; W = Win; D = Draw; L = Loss

==== Matches ====
20 August 2017 1	Borussia Mönchengladbach	1–0	1. FC Köln	Mönchengladbach
18:00 CEST (UTC+2)	Elvedi 49'	Report		Stadium: Borussia-Park; Attendance: 54,018; Referee: Deniz Aytekin

26 August 2017 2	FC Augsburg	2–2	Borussia Mönchengladbach	Augsburg
15:30 CEST (UTC+2)	Finnbogason 1'; Córdova 89'	Report	Zakaria 7'; Wendt 30'	Stadium: WWK Arena; Attendance: 29,243; Referee: Sascha Stegemann

9 September 2017 3	Borussia Mönchengladbach	0–1	Eintracht Frankfurt	Mönchengladbach
15:30 CEST (UTC+2)		Report	Boateng 13'	Stadium: Borussia-Park; Attendance: 51,431; Referee: Robert Kampka

16 September 2017 4	RB Leipzig	2–2	Borussia Mönchengladbach	Leipzig
18:30 CEST (UTC+2)	Werner 17'; Augustin 31'	Report	Hazard 25' (pen.); Stindl 61'	Stadium: Red Bull Arena; Attendance: 42,558; Referee: Marco Fritz

19 September 2017 5	Borussia Mönchengladbach	2–0	VfB Stuttgart	Mönchengladbach
18:30 CEST (UTC+2)	Raffael 57', 74' (pen.)	Report		Stadium: Borussia-Park; Attendance: 44,063; Referee: Sören Storks

23 September 2017 6	Borussia Dortmund	6–1	Borussia Mönchengladbach	Dortmund
18:30 CEST (UTC+2)	Philipp 28', 38'; Aubameyang 45', 49', 62'; Weigl 79'	Report	Stindl 66'	Stadium: Signal Iduna Park; Attendance: 81,360; Referee: Manuel Gräfe

30 September 2017 7	Borussia Mönchengladbach	2–1	Hannover 96	Mönchengladbach
15:40 CEST (UTC+2)	Ginter 67'; Hazard 90+4' (pen.)	Report	Harnik 71'	Stadium: Borussia-Park; Attendance: 50,542; Referee: Christian Dingert
Note: The match, originally scheduled for 15:30 CEST, was delayed to 15:40 CEST due to a traffic jam outside the stadium.

15 October 2017 8	Werder Bremen	0–2	Borussia Mönchengladbach	Bremen
18:00 CEST (UTC+2)		Report	Stindl 27'; Vestergaard 34'	Stadium: Weser-Stadion; Attendance: 42,100; Referee: Markus Schmidt

21 October 2017 9	Borussia Mönchengladbach	1–5	Bayer Leverkusen	Mönchengladbach
15:30 CEST (UTC+2)	Johnson 7'	Report	S. Bender 48'; Bailey 59'; Brandt 61'; Volland 69'; Pohjanpalo 81'	Stadium: Borussia-Park; Attendance: 53,053; Referee: Bastian Dankert

28 October 2017 10	1899 Hoffenheim	1–3	Borussia Mönchengladbach	Sinsheim
15:30 CEST (UTC+2)	Demirbay 25'	Report	Hazard 61'; Ginter 79'; Vestergaard 82'	Stadium: Wirsol Rhein-Neckar-Arena; Attendance: 30,150; Referee: Harm Osmers

4 November 2017 11	Borussia Mönchengladbach	1–1	Mainz 05	Mönchengladbach
15:30 CET (UTC+1)	Vestergaard 67'	Report	Diallo 19'	Stadium: Borussia-Park; Attendance: 52,659; Referee: Sven Jablonski

18 November 2017 12	Hertha BSC	2–4	Borussia Mönchengladbach	Berlin
18:30 CET (UTC+1)	Ibišević 28'; Weiser 71'	Report	Stindl 5'; Hazard 14' (pen.); Raffael 20', 77'	Stadium: Olympiastadion Berlin; Attendance: 48,304; Referee: Bastian Dankert

25 November 2017 13	Borussia Mönchengladbach	2–1	Bayern Munich	Mönchengladbach
18:30 CET (UTC+1)	Hazard 39' (pen.); Ginter 44'	Report	Vidal 74'	Stadium: Borussia-Park; Attendance: 54,018; Referee: Manuel Gräfe

3 December 2017 14	VfL Wolfsburg	3–0	Borussia Mönchengladbach	Wolfsburg
18:00 CET (UTC+1)	Mallı 4'; Didavi 25'; Guilavogui 71'	Report		Stadium: Volkswagen Arena; Attendance: 24,250; Referee: Benjamin Cortus

9 December 2017 15	Borussia Mönchengladbach	1–1	Schalke 04	Mönchengladbach
18:30 CET (UTC+1)	Kramer 24'	Report	Vestergaard 62' (o.g.)	Stadium: Borussia-Park; Attendance: 54,018; Referee: Sascha Stegemann

12 December 2017 16	SC Freiburg	1–0	Borussia Mönchengladbach	Freiburg
20:40 CET (UTC+1)	Petersen 20' (pen.)	Report		Stadium: Schwarzwald-Stadion; Attendance: 23,800; Referee: Deniz Aytekin

15 December 2017 17	Borussia Mönchengladbach	3–1	Hamburger SV	Mönchengladbach
20:30 CET (UTC+1)	Hazard 9'; Raffael 74', 79'	Report	Hahn 53'	Stadium: Borussia-Park; Attendance: 51,409; Referee: Markus Schmidt

14 January 2018 18	1. FC Köln	2–1	Borussia Mönchengladbach	Cologne
15:30 CET (UTC+1)	Sørensen 34'; Terodde 90+5'	Report	Raffael 69'	Stadium: RheinEnergieStadion; Attendance: 50,000; Referee: Felix Zwayer

20 January 2018 19	Borussia Mönchengladbach	2–0	FC Augsburg	Mönchengladbach
15:30 CET (UTC+1)	Ginter 10'; Hazard 90'	Report		Stadium: Borussia-Park; Attendance: 42,016; Referee: Bibiana Steinhaus

26 January 2018 20	Eintracht Frankfurt	2–0	Borussia Mönchengladbach	Frankfurt
20:30 CET (UTC+1)	Boateng 43'; Jović 90+2'	Report		Stadium: Commerzbank-Arena; Attendance: 47,500; Referee: Marco Fritz

3 February 2018 21	Borussia Mönchengladbach	0–1	RB Leipzig	Mönchengladbach
18:30 CET (UTC+1)		Report	Lookman 89'	Stadium: Borussia-Park; Attendance: 49,018; Referee: Tobias Stieler

11 February 2018 22	VfB Stuttgart	1–0	Borussia Mönchengladbach	Stuttgart
15:30 CET (UTC+1)	Ginczek 5'	Report		Stadium: Mercedes-Benz Arena; Attendance: 53,296; Referee: Frank Willenborg

18 February 2018 23	Borussia Mönchengladbach	0–1	Borussia Dortmund	Mönchengladbach
18:00 CET (UTC+1)		Report	Reus 32'	Stadium: Borussia-Park; Attendance: 54,018; Referee: Bastian Dankert

24 February 2018 24	Hannover 96	0–1	Borussia Mönchengladbach	Hanover
15:30 CET (UTC+1)		Report	Kramer 72'	Stadium: HDI-Arena; Attendance: 43,000; Referee: Robert Kampka

2 March 2018 25	Borussia Mönchengladbach	2–2	Werder Bremen	Mönchengladbach
20:30 CET (UTC+1)	Zakaria 5'; Moisander 33' (o.g.)	Report	Delaney 59'; Jóhannsson 78'	Stadium: Borussia-Park; Attendance: 52,211; Referee: Benjamin Cortus

10 March 2018 26	Bayer Leverkusen	2–0	Borussia Mönchengladbach	Leverkusen
18:30 CET (UTC+1)	Alario 39'; Brandt 90+3'	Report		Stadium: BayArena; Attendance: 28,809; Referee: Robert Hartmann

17 March 2018 27	Borussia Mönchengladbach	3–3	1899 Hoffenheim	Mönchengladbach
15:30 CET (UTC+1)	Drmić 33'; Stindl 72'; Ginter 90'	Report	Hübner 13'; Kramarić 58' (pen.); Grillitsch 73'	Stadium: Borussia-Park; Attendance: 51,049; Referee: Martin Petersen

1 April 2018 28	Mainz 05	0–0	Borussia Mönchengladbach	Mainz
18:00 CEST (UTC+2)		Report		Stadium: Opel Arena; Attendance: 30,173; Referee: Manuel Gräfe

7 April 2018 29	Borussia Mönchengladbach	2–1	Hertha BSC	Mönchengladbach
15:30 CEST (UTC+2)	Hazard 75', 79' (pen.)	Report	Kalou 40'	Stadium: Borussia-Park; Attendance: 51,417; Referee: Bibiana Steinhaus

14 April 2018 30	Bayern Munich	5–1	Borussia Mönchengladbach	Munich
18:30 CEST (UTC+2)	Wagner 37', 41'; Thiago 51'; Alaba 67'; Lewandowski 82'	Report	Drmić 9'	Stadium: Allianz Arena; Attendance: 75,000; Referee: Robert Kampka

20 April 2018 31	Borussia Mönchengladbach	3–0	VfL Wolfsburg	Mönchengladbach
20:30 CEST (UTC+2)	Stindl 8'; Raffael 35'; Kramer 44'	Report		Stadium: Borussia-Park; Attendance: 47,797; Referee: Tobias Stieler

28 April 2018 32	Schalke 04	1–1	Borussia Mönchengladbach	Gelsenkirchen
15:30 CEST (UTC+2)	Caligiuri 45+3' (pen.)	Report	Raffael 32'	Stadium: Veltins-Arena; Attendance: 62,271; Referee: Harm Osmers

5 May 2018 33	Borussia Mönchengladbach	3–1	SC Freiburg	Mönchengladbach
15:30 CEST (UTC+2)	Hazard 18'; Elvedi 57'; Drmić 64'	Report	Kleindienst 59'	Stadium: Borussia-Park; Attendance: 54,018; Referee: Manuel Gräfe

12 May 2018 34	Hamburger SV	2–1	Borussia Mönchengladbach	Hamburg
15:30 CEST (UTC+2)	Hunt 11' (pen.); Holtby 63'	Report	Drmić 28'	Stadium: Volksparkstadion; Attendance: 57,000; Referee: Felix Brych

=== DFB-Pokal ===
11 August 2017 First round	Rot-Weiss Essen	1–2	Borussia Mönchengladbach	Essen
20:45 CEST (UTC+2)	Baier 29'	Report	Hofmann 79'; Raffael 82'	Stadium: Stadion Essen; Attendance: 18,500; Referee: Patrick Ittrich

24 October 2017 Second round	Fortuna Düsseldorf	0–1	Borussia Mönchengladbach	Düsseldorf
18:30 CEST (UTC+2)		Report	Hazard 52'	Stadium: Esprit Arena; Attendance: 52,500; Referee: Manuel Gräfe

20 December 2017 Round of 16	Borussia Mönchengladbach	0–1	Bayer Leverkusen	Mönchengladbach
18:40 CET (UTC+1)		Report	Bailey 70'	Stadium: Borussia-Park; Attendance: 49,016; Referee: Manuel Gräfe

== Statistics ==
=== Appearances and goals ===
No.	Pos	Nat	Player	Total		Bundesliga		DFB-Pokal	
No.	Pos	Nat	Player	Apps	Goals	Apps	Goals	Apps	Goals
Goalkeepers
1	GK	(Switzerland) SUI	Yann Sommer	33	0	30	0	3	0
21	GK	(Germany) GER	Tobias Sippel	5	0	4+1	0	0	0
35	GK	(Germany) GER	Moritz Nicolas	0	0	0	0	0	0
Defenders
2	DF	(England) ENG	Mandela Egbo	1	0	0+1	0	0	0
3	DF	(England) ENG	Reece Oxford	4	0	2+1	0	1	0
4	DF	(Denmark) DEN	Jannik Vestergaard	34	3	32	3	2	0
17	DF	(Sweden) SWE	Oscar Wendt	31	1	28	1	3	0
24	DF	(Germany) GER	Tony Jantschke	14	0	8+5	0	1	0
28	DF	(Germany) GER	Matthias Ginter	37	5	34	5	3	0
29	DF	(France) FRA	Mamadou Doucouré	0	0	0	0	0	0
30	DF	(Switzerland) SUI	Nico Elvedi	36	2	33	2	3	0
38	DF	(Germany) GER	Marcel Benger	1	0	0+1	0	0	0
42	DF	(Germany) GER	Florian Mayer	1	0	0+1	0	0	0
Midfielders
5	MF	(Germany) GER	Tobias Strobl	4	0	1+3	0	0	0
6	MF	(Germany) GER	Christoph Kramer	28	3	26+1	3	1	0
7	MF	(Germany) GER	Patrick Herrmann	26	0	12+11	0	1+2	0
8	MF	(Switzerland) SUI	Denis Zakaria	33	2	29+1	2	3	0
16	MF	(Guinea) GUI	Ibrahima Traoré	9	0	1+6	0	2	0
19	MF	(United States) USA	Fabian Johnson	12	1	5+5	1	0+2	0
22	MF	(Slovakia) SVK	László Bénes	2	0	0+2	0	0	0
23	MF	(Germany) GER	Jonas Hofmann	25	1	12+11	0	0+2	1
27	MF	(France) FRA	Michaël Cuisance	26	0	9+15	0	2	0
32	MF	(Italy) ITA	Vincenzo Grifo	18	0	9+8	0	0+1	0
Forwards
10	FW	(Belgium) BEL	Thorgan Hazard	37	11	33+1	10	3	1
11	FW	(Brazil) BRA	Raffael	29	10	23+4	9	2	1
13	FW	(Germany) GER	Lars Stindl	34	6	31	6	3	0
18	FW	(Switzerland) SUI	Josip Drmić	14	4	4+9	4	0+1	0
20	FW	(Paraguay) PAR	Julio Villalba	1	0	0+1	0	0	0
26	FW	(Paraguay) PAR	Raúl Bobadilla	14	0	5+8	0	0+1	0
Players transferred out during the season

Last updated: 12 May 2018
Source: Competitions
