= 2016 Uhrencup =

Tournament details
- Host country: Switzerland
- Dates: 13–19 July
- Teams: 4 (from 1 confederation)
- Venue: 2 (in 2 host cities)

Final positions
- Champions: (Turkey) Galatasaray (1st title)
- Runners-up: (Switzerland) Zürich
- Third place: (Switzerland) Young Boys
- Fourth place: (Germany) Borussia Mönchengladbach

Tournament statistics
- Matches played: 4
- Goals scored: 14 (3.5 per match)
- Top scorer(s): (Portugal) Bruma (Belgium) Thorgan Hazard (2 goals)

The 2016 Uhrencup was a summer football friendly tournament. Matches were played in Grenchen and Biel. Swiss clubs Young Boys (Super League) and Zürich (Challenge League) were joined by Borussia Mönchengladbach (Germany) and Galatasaray (Turkey). It was the 52nd edition of the Uhrencup, but the first since 2013.

== Overview ==
=== Participants ===
Nation	Team	Location	Confederation	League
Turkey	Galatasaray	Istanbul	UEFA	Süper Lig
Switzerland	Zürich	Zürich	UEFA	Swiss Super League
Germany	Borussia Mönchengladbach	Mönchengladbach	UEFA	Bundesliga
Switzerland	Young Boys	Bern	UEFA	Swiss Super League

=== Standings ===
The tournament consisted of four matches, with three points given for a win, two for a penalty shoot-out win, one for a penalty shoot-out loss or a draw, and zero for a loss. A penalty shoot-out was used to determine the winners if tied after 90 minutes. However, after the final match between Galatasaray and Young Boys finished as a 1–1 draw, Galatasaray mathematically became champions, therefore no penalty shoot-out took place.

Pos	Team	Pld	W	WP	D	LP	L	GF	GA	GD	Pts	Final result
1	(Turkey) Galatasaray	2	1	0	1	0	0	4	1	+3	4	2016 Uhrencup Champions
2	(Switzerland) Zürich	2	1	0	0	0	1	2	4	−2	3	
3	(Germany) Borussia Mönchengladbach	2	0	1	0	0	1	5	5	0	2	
4	(Switzerland) Young Boys	2	0	0	1	1	0	4	5	−1	2	

Source: Uhrencup
Rules for classification: 1) Points; 2) Goal difference; 3) Goals scored; 4) Goal ratio

=== Matches ===
13 July 2016
19:30 CEST

Young Boys (Switzerland)	3–3	(Germany) Borussia Mönchengladbach
Vilotić 22'; Bertone 51'; Sulejmani 59'	Report	Hazard 20' (pen.), 45'; Ndenge 85'
Penalties
Sulejmani (penalty scored); Bertone (penalty missed); Ravet (penalty scored); Kubo (penalty scored); Gajić (penalty scored)	4–5	(penalty scored) Christensen; (penalty scored) Sow; (penalty scored) Ndenge; (penalty scored) Strobl; (penalty scored) Traoré

Stadion Brühl, Grenchen
Attendance: 4,480
Referee: Sandro Schärer (Switzerland)

15 July 2016
19:30 CEST

Borussia Mönchengladbach (Germany)	1–2	(Switzerland) Zürich
Hahn 59'	http://uhrencup.ch/2016/07/15/der-uhrencup-live-day-2/	Winter 61'; Rodríguez 82' (pen.)

Tissot Arena, Biel
Attendance: 1,952
Referee: San Fedayi (Switzerland)

17 July 2016
16:00 CEST

Galatasaray (Turkey)	3–0	(Switzerland) Zürich
Bruma 36'; Adili 83'; Ünsal 86'	http://uhrencup.ch/2016/07/17/der-uhrencup-live-day-3/

Tissot Arena, Biel
Referee: San Fedayi (Switzerland)

19 July 2016
19:30 CEST

Young Boys (Switzerland)	1–1	(Turkey) Galatasaray
Lecjaks 84'	Report	Bruma 14'

Tissot Arena, Biel
Referee: Nikolaj Hänni (Switzerland)

=== Goalscorers ===
Rank	Name	Team	Goals
1	(Portugal) Bruma	(Turkey) Galatasaray	2
1	(Belgium) Thorgan Hazard	(Germany) Borussia Mönchengladbach	2
2	(Switzerland) Adrian Winter	(Switzerland) Zürich	1
2	(Germany) André Hahn	(Germany) Borussia Mönchengladbach	1
2	(Turkey) Berk İsmail Ünsal	(Turkey) Galatasaray	1
2	(Switzerland) Endoğan Adili	(Turkey) Galatasaray	1
2	(Czech Republic) Jan Lecjaks	(Switzerland) Young Boys	1
2	(Switzerland) Leonardo Bertone	(Switzerland) Young Boys	1
2	(Serbia) Milan Vilotić	(Switzerland) Young Boys	1
2	(Serbia) Miralem Sulejmani	(Switzerland) Young Boys	1
2	(Switzerland) Roberto Rodríguez Araya	(Switzerland) Zürich	1
2	(Germany) Tsiy Ndenge	(Germany) Borussia Mönchengladbach	1

== Media coverage ==
Market	Countries	Broadcast partner	Ref
Bosnia and Herzegovina	1	Arena Sport (Bosnian) (selected games)	
Croatia	1	Arena Sport (Croatian) (selected games)	
Czech Republic	1	Nova Sport (Czech) (selected games)	
Germany	1	Sport1 (German) (Borussia Mönchengladbach games only)	
International	195	Bet365 (N/A) bwin (N/A) (selected games)	
Montenegro	1	Arena Sport (Montenegrin) (selected games)	
Serbia	1	Arena Sport (Serbian)	
Slovakia	1	Nova Sport (Slovak) (selected games)	
Turkey	1	Smart Spor (Turkish) (Galatasaray games only)	
Total countries	195		

== See also ==
- Uhrencup
