= Florian Mayer (footballer) =

German footballer (born 1998)

Personal information
- Date of birth: 4 March 1998 (age 28)
- Place of birth: Essen, Germany
- Height: 1.90 m (6 ft 3 in)
- Position: Centre-back

Team information
- Current team: Sportfreunde Siegen
- Number: 42

Youth career
- 2005–2013: Schalke 04
- 2013–2016: VfL Bochum
- 2016–2017: Borussia Mönchengladbach

Senior career*
Years	Team	Apps	(Gls)
2017–2021	Borussia Mönchengladbach II	49	(0)
2018–2021	Borussia Mönchengladbach	1	(0)
2021–2023	Roda JC	10	(0)
2023–2024	1. FC Bocholt	11	(0)
2024–	Sportfreunde Siegen	74	(2)

International career
2017	Germany U19	1	(0)
2017	Germany U20	1	(0)
- * Club domestic league appearances and goals as of 23 September 2026

Florian Mayer (born 4 March 1998) is a German professional footballer who plays as a centre-back for Regionalliga West club Sportfreunde Siegen.

== Club career ==
=== Borussia Mönchengladbach ===
Mayer started playing football in Schalke 04's academy before signing with VfL Bochum in 2014, where he scored once in 26 appearances in the Under 17 Bundesliga and then 22 appearances in the Under 19 Bundesliga. In 2016, he joined Borussia Mönchengladbach's under-19s, and from the 2017–18 season on, he predominantly played for Borussia's under-23s.

He first appeared in the first-team squad in the Rhineland derby between 1. FC Köln and Borussia Mönchengladbach on 14 January 2018, remaining on the bench in his team's 2–1 defeat. Mayer made his professional debut on 1 April 2018 in the Bundesliga game against Mainz 05, coming on as a substitute for the injured Nico Elvedi in the 72nd minute. Several serious injuries set the centre-back back, including two cruciate ligament ruptures.

On 1 June 2018, Mayer signed his first professional contract with Mönchengladbach.

=== Roda JC ===
Prior to the 2021–22 campaign, Mayer moved to the Netherlands on a free transfer to second-division club Roda JC, signing a one-year deal until 2022. Shortly after signing, he suffered a serious injury in practice, sidelining him for the entire season.

Mayer made his competitive debut for Roda on 5 August 2022, the first matchday of the 2022–23 season, replacing Bryan Limbombe in the 91st minute of a 2–0 away victory against Dordrecht at the Krommedijk.

=== 1. FC Bocholt ===
On 23 May 2023, Mayer signed a one-year contract with Regionalliga West club 1. FC Bocholt. Upon signing, new Bocholt manager Dietmar Hirsch expressed his pleasure with the signing: "With Florian, we gain a highly trained, physically strong centre-back. He made a name for himself at Borussia Mönchengladbach but was unfortunately hindered by injuries. However, he has been fit for over a year now and has demonstrated his excellence in the second-tier Dutch league. Flo will be a valuable asset to us both on and off the field, adding stability to our defense. I'm certain that he will bring us a lot of joy."

Mayer made his debut for the club on 29 July, the first matchday of the season, replacing an injured Jarno Janssen in the 36th minute of a 5–2 away victory against Schalke 04 II.

== International career ==
Mayer is a former Germany youth international, having made one appearance each for the national under-19 and under-20 teams.

== Career statistics ==
As of match played 4 July 2024

Appearances and goals by club, season and competition
Club	Season	League			National cup		Other		Total	
Club	Season	Division	Apps	Goals	Apps	Goals	Apps	Goals	Apps	Goals
Borussia Mönchengladbach II	2016–17	Regionalliga West	3	0	—		—		3	0
Borussia Mönchengladbach II	2017–18	Regionalliga West	20	0	—		—		20	0
Borussia Mönchengladbach II	2018–19	Regionalliga West	13	0	—		—		13	0
Borussia Mönchengladbach II	2019–20	Regionalliga West	3	0	—		—		3	0
Borussia Mönchengladbach II	2020–21	Regionalliga West	10	0	—		—		10	0
Borussia Mönchengladbach II	Total		49	0	—		—		49	0
Borussia Mönchengladbach	2017–18	Bundesliga	1	0	0	0	0	0	1	0
Roda JC	2021–22	Eerste Divisie	0	0	0	0	0	0	0	0
Roda JC	2022–23	Eerste Divisie	10	0	1	0	—		11	0
Roda JC	Total		10	0	1	0	0	0	11	0
1. FC Bocholt	2023–24	Regionalliga West	11	0	0	0	2 (Note: Appearances in Lower Rhine Cup)	0	13	0
Sportfreunde Siegen	2024–25	Oberliga Westfalen	35	0	0	0	–		35	0
Career total			106	0	1	0	2	0	109	0
