= Tony Jantschke =

German footballer (born 1990)

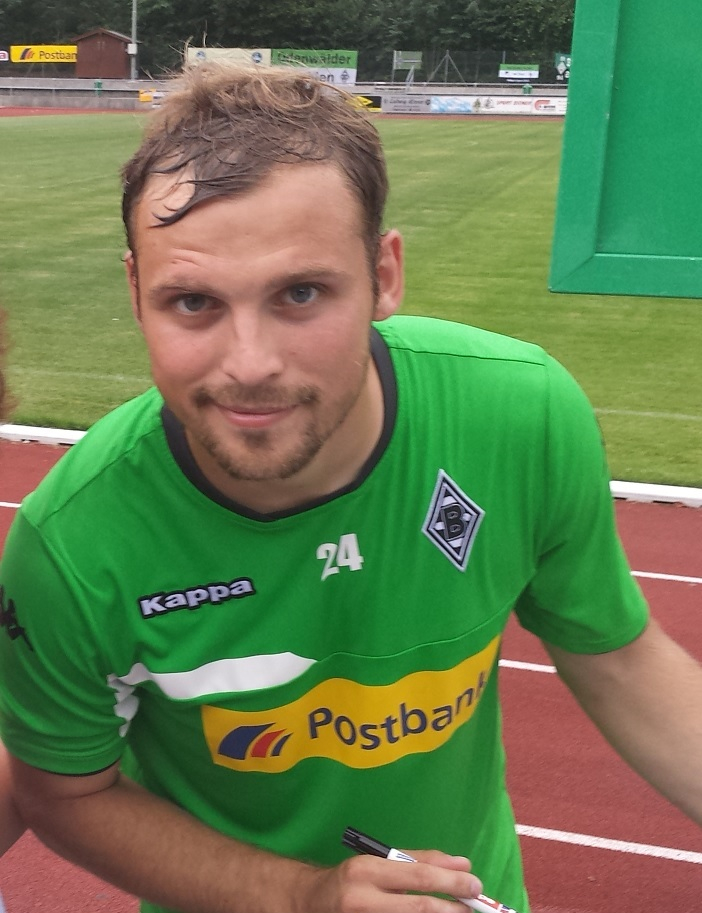
- Jantschke with Borussia Mönchengladbach in 2015

Personal information
- Full name: Tony Jantschke
- Date of birth: 7 April 1990 (age 36)
- Place of birth: Hoyerswerda, East Germany
- Height: 1.77 m (5 ft 10 in)
- Positions: Centre-back; right-back

Youth career
- 1996–2001: Hoyerswerdaer SV Einheit
- 2001–2006: FV Dresden-Nord
- 2006–2008: Borussia Mönchengladbach

Senior career*
Years	Team	Apps	(Gls)
2008–2011	Borussia Mönchengladbach II	22	(2)
2008–2024	Borussia Mönchengladbach	247	(5)
Total		269	(7)

International career
2007	Germany U17	14	(0)
2007–2008	Germany U18	4	(0)
2008–2009	Germany U19	8	(0)
2009–2010	Germany U20	5	(0)
2010–2013	Germany U21	18	(0)
- * Club domestic league appearances and goals

Tony Jantschke (born 7 April 1990) is a German former professional footballer who played as a centre-back or right-back.

Having been a product of Borussia Mönchengladbach's youth academy, Jantschke spent his entire professional career with the latter, making his debut in 2008, all the way until his retirement from football in 2024 at the age of 34.

== Career ==
Jantschke began his career at Hoyerswerdaer SV Einheit and FV Dresden-Nord before moving to Borussia Mönchengladbach in 2006. There he was used in the youth teams and in the second team, living for almost two years in the club's youth boarding school. On 29 November 2008, he made his Bundesliga debut under coach Hans Meyer in a 3-1 home loss to Energie Cottbus, coming on as a substitute for Gal Alberman in the 46th minute. He scored his first Bundesliga goal in the game in a 1–3 loss against Bayer Leverkusen on 6 December 2008, in which he played the full 90 minutes. At 18 years and 243 days, he is Borussia's third youngest goalscorer in the Bundesliga, behind Marco Villa and Rainer Bonhof.

Jantschke signed a professional contract on 1 January 2009, which initially ran until the end of June 2012 and was later extended to 2018. At the beginning of the 2010–11 season, he got injured on 12 September 2010 in the second team's Regionalliga match against SC Wiedenbrück and, after breaking his left metatarsal, missed almost the entire first half of the season.

Jantschke, who was initially used as a defensive midfielder under Hans Meyer in Mönchengladbach (but has also played as a left or central defender), had seen himself as a "defensive all-rounder". In the 2011–12 season, however, he found himself frequently playing at right-back, with his former German youth national team coach being the first to let him play a wide position in defence. There, he supplanted Tobias Levels and earned himself a regular place on this defensive side. During the first half of the 2013–14 season, he was moved from full-back to central defense and was used in this position for several games.

On 20 April 2017, Jantschke extended his contract in Mönchengladbach until 2021.

In December 2020, Jantschke signed a new three-year deal with the club, extending his contract until 2023. In addition, an agreement was reached according to which he would take on a task in the club after his playing career.

On 6 April 2023, his contract was extended until the end of the 2023–24 season. The agreement that he would remain with the club beyond his active career was confirmed. On 30 April 2024, Jantschke announced that he would retire from professional football at the end of the season, with teammate Patrick Herrmann.

== Career statistics ==
Appearances and goals by club, season and competition
Club	Season	League			DFB-Pokal		Europe		Total	
Club	Season	Division	Apps	Goals	Apps	Goals	Apps	Goals	Apps	Goals
Borussia Mönchengladbach II	2008–09	Regionalliga West	6	1	—		—		6	1
Borussia Mönchengladbach II	2009–10	Regionalliga West	12	1	—		—		12	1
Borussia Mönchengladbach II	2010–11	Regionalliga West	4	0	—		—		4	0
Borussia Mönchengladbach II	Total		22	2	—		—		22	2
Borussia Mönchengladbach	2008–09	Bundesliga	4	1	0	0	—		4	1
Borussia Mönchengladbach	2009–10	Bundesliga	6	0	0	0	—		6	0
Borussia Mönchengladbach	2010–11	Bundesliga	11	0	3	0	—		14	0
Borussia Mönchengladbach	2011–12	Bundesliga	32	1	4	0	—		36	1
Borussia Mönchengladbach	2012–13	Bundesliga	31	1	1	0	8	0	40	1
Borussia Mönchengladbach	2013–14	Bundesliga	31	1	0	0	—		31	1
Borussia Mönchengladbach	2014–15	Bundesliga	31	1	4	0	10	0	45	1
Borussia Mönchengladbach	2015–16	Bundesliga	12	0	2	0	1	0	15	0
Borussia Mönchengladbach	2016–17	Bundesliga	22	0	4	0	9	0	35	0
Borussia Mönchengladbach	2017–18	Bundesliga	13	0	1	0	—		14	0
Borussia Mönchengladbach	2018–19	Bundesliga	14	0	1	0	—		15	0
Borussia Mönchengladbach	2019–20	Bundesliga	17	0	0	0	2	0	19	0
Borussia Mönchengladbach	2020–21	Bundesliga	8	0	1	0	3	0	12	0
Borussia Mönchengladbach	2021–22	Bundesliga	3	0	0	0	—		3	0
Borussia Mönchengladbach	2022–23	Bundesliga	8	0	0	0	—		8	0
Borussia Mönchengladbach	2023–24	Bundesliga	4	0	1	0	—		5	0
Borussia Mönchengladbach	Total		247	5	22	0	33	0	302	5
Career total			269	7	22	0	33	0	324	7
