= Patrick Herrmann =

German footballer (born 1991)

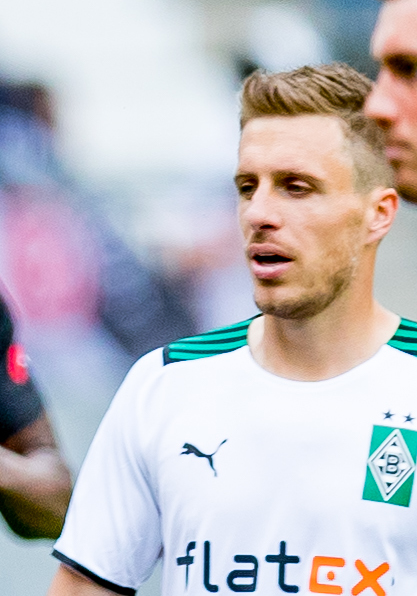
- Herrmann with Borussia Mönchengladbach in 2022

Personal information
- Full name: Patrick Herrmann
- Date of birth: 12 February 1991 (age 35)
- Place of birth: Saarbrücken, Germany
- Height: 1.79 m (5 ft 10 in)
- Position: Right winger

Youth career
- 1995–2004: FC Uchtelfangen
- 2004–2008: 1. FC Saarbrücken
- 2008–2009: Borussia Mönchengladbach

Senior career*
Years	Team	Apps	(Gls)
2009–2011	Borussia Mönchengladbach II	14	(1)
2010–2024	Borussia Mönchengladbach	351	(47)
Total		365	(48)

International career
2006–2007	Germany U16	12	(3)
2007–2008	Germany U17	8	(2)
2008–2009	Germany U18	10	(1)
2010	Germany U19	2	(0)
2011	Germany U20	4	(3)
2010–2013	Germany U21	14	(5)
2015	Germany	2	(0)
- * Club domestic league appearances and goals

Patrick Herrmann (born 12 February 1991) is a German former professional footballer who played as a right winger.

Having been a youth graduate of Borussia Mönchengladbach, he spent his entire professional career with the club in the Bundesliga, making his debut in 2010 all the way up to his retirement in 2024 aged 33.

== Club career ==
Born in Saarbrücken, Herrmann began playing football at FC Uchtelfangen based in nearby Illingen. At the age of 13 he joined 1. FC Saarbrücken, before transferring to Borussia Mönchengladbach in the summer of 2008.

On 16 January 2010, Herrmann made his first team debut, appearing as a substitute in a Bundesliga match against VfL Bochum. Gladbach scored less than a minute later, with Herrmann providing the assist for fellow debutant Fabian Bäcker, but went on to lose the match 2–1. Herrmann appeared 13 times in the second half of the 2009–10 season, and was rewarded with a new contract, keeping him at the club until 2014. On 1 April 2015, he signed a contract to 2019.

In May 2019, Herrmann further extended his contract until 2022.

On 25 April 2024, Herrmann announced that he would retire at the end of the season, with teammate Tony Jantschke also later announcing his retirement from football.

== International career ==
Herrmann had represented Germany on the U16s and U21 teams. On 24 March 2013, he was called up for the senior national team for the first time, for a 2014 World Cup qualifier against Kazakhstan. Herrmann made his debut on 10 June 2015 at the RheinEnergieStadion in Cologne, starting the match and assisting Mario Götze's opener in an eventual 1–2 friendly defeat to the United States.

== Career statistics ==
=== Club ===
Appearances and goals by club, season and competition
Club	Season	League			Cup		Continental		Total		Ref.
Club	Season	Division	Apps	Goals	Apps	Goals	Apps	Goals	Apps	Goals	Ref.
Borussia Mönchengladbach II	2009–10	Regionalliga	11	0	—		—		11	0	
Borussia Mönchengladbach II	2010–11	Regionalliga	2	0	—		—		2	0	
Borussia Mönchengladbach II	2011–12	Regionalliga	1	1	—		—		1	1	
Borussia Mönchengladbach II	Total		14	1	—		—		14	1	—
Borussia Mönchengladbach	2009–10	Bundesliga	13	1	0	0	—		13	1	
Borussia Mönchengladbach	2010–11	Bundesliga	24	3	2	0	—		26	3	
Borussia Mönchengladbach	2011–12	Bundesliga	27	6	5	0	—		32	6	
Borussia Mönchengladbach	2012–13	Bundesliga	32	6	2	0	8 (Note: Two appearances in UEFA Champions League, six appearances in UEFA Europa League)	0	42	6	
Borussia Mönchengladbach	2013–14	Bundesliga	34	6	1	0	—		35	6	
Borussia Mönchengladbach	2014–15	Bundesliga	32	11	4	1	10 (Note: Appearances in UEFA Europa League)	4	46	16	
Borussia Mönchengladbach	2015–16	Bundesliga	18	3	1	0	1 (Note: Appearance(s) in UEFA Champions League)	0	20	3	
Borussia Mönchengladbach	2016–17	Bundesliga	18	1	5	0	8 (Note: Four appearances in UEFA Champions League, four appearances in UEFA Europa League)	0	31	1	
Borussia Mönchengladbach	2017–18	Bundesliga	23	0	3	0	—		26	0	
Borussia Mönchengladbach	2018–19	Bundesliga	24	3	2	0	—		26	3	
Borussia Mönchengladbach	2019–20	Bundesliga	27	6	1	0	5	1	33	7	
Borussia Mönchengladbach	2020–21	Bundesliga	27	0	2	3	4	0	33	3	
Borussia Mönchengladbach	2021–22	Bundesliga	23	0	3	0	—		26	0	
Borussia Mönchengladbach	2022–23	Bundesliga	21	1	2	0	—		23	1	
Borussia Mönchengladbach	2023–24	Bundesliga	8	0	0	0	—		8	0	
Borussia Mönchengladbach	Total		351	47	33	4	36	5	420	56	—
Career total			365	48	33	4	36	5	434	57	—

=== International ===
Appearances and goals by national team and year
National team	Year	Apps	Goals
Germany	2015	2	0
Total		2	0
