= Jarno Janssen =

Dutch footballer (born 2000)

Personal information
- Date of birth: 19 September 2000 (age 26)
- Place of birth: Eindhoven, Netherlands
- Height: 1.87 m (6 ft 2 in)
- Position: Centre-back

Team information
- Current team: IJsselmeervogels
- Number: 28

Youth career
- VV DBS
- –2016: VVV
- 2016–2018: FC Eindhoven

Senior career*
Years	Team	Apps	(Gls)
2018–2023	FC Eindhoven	54	(1)
2023–2025	1. FC Bocholt	51	(1)
2025	Kickers Emden	11	(0)
2026–	IJsselmeervogels	14	(0)
- * Club domestic league appearances and goals as of 12:42, 25 October 2026 (UTC)

Jarno Janssen (born 19 September 2000) is a Dutch professional footballer who plays as a centre-back for Tweede Divisie club IJsselmeervogels.

== Career ==
=== Eindhoven ===
Janssen made his Eerste Divisie debut for FC Eindhoven on 24 August 2018 in a game against Go Ahead Eagles, as a 79th-minute substitute for Charni Ekangamene.

=== 1. FC Bocholt ===
On 27 July 2023, Janssen signed a two-year contract with Regionalliga West club 1. FC Bocholt. Upon signing, new Bocholt manager Dietmar Hirsch expressed his pleasure with the signing: "With Jarno we've gained a defender who is robust and really looks good. He's also left-footed, which we haven't had in our central defense before. At 22, he has gained a lot of experience in the Dutch second division over the past two seasons. We've been looking for another central defender for a long time and we're sure that Jarno can help us right away. You also noticed in the first training sessions that his character suits us very well."

Janssen made his debut for the club on 29 July, the first matchday of the season, starting at centre-back in a 5–2 away victory against Schalke 04 II. However, he fell out with an injury in the first half and was replaced by Florian Mayer.

=== Kickers Emden ===
On 1 June 2025, Janssen joined German Regionalliga Nord side Kickers Emden.

=== IJsselmeervogels ===
On 30 December 2025, Janssen joined Tweede Divisie club IJsselmeervogels on a one-and-a-half-year contract.
