= László Bénes =

Slovak footballer

- Bénes with Gent in 2026

Personal information
- Date of birth: 9 September 1997 (age 29)
- Place of birth: Dunajská Streda, Slovakia
- Height: 1.81 m (5 ft 11 in)
- Position: Midfielder

Team information
- Current team: Gent

Youth career
- GBS Šamorín
- 2007–2011: DAC Dunajská Streda
- 2011–2014: ETO Győr

Senior career*
Years	Team	Apps	(Gls)
2014–2015	ETO Győr	1	(0)
2015–2016	Žilina	31	(2)
2015	Žilina B	6	(0)
2016–2022	Borussia Mönchengladbach	53	(1)
2016–2018	Borussia Mönchengladbach II	16	(1)
2019	→ Holstein Kiel (loan)	15	(2)
2021	→ FC Augsburg (loan)	12	(1)
2022–2024	Hamburger SV	60	(19)
2024–2026	Union Berlin	23	(1)
2025–2026	→ Kayserispor (loan)	32	(7)
2026–	Gent	4	(0)

International career^{‡}
2013–2014	Slovakia U16	1	(0)
2013	Slovakia U17	2	(0)
2014	Slovakia U18	2	(0)
2014–2015	Slovakia U19	8	(3)
2015–2018	Slovakia U21	12	(3)
2017–	Slovakia	42	(2)
- * Club domestic league appearances and goals as of 18 October 2026 ‡ National team caps and goals as of 5 June 2026

László Bénes (born 9 September 1997) is a Slovak professional footballer who plays as a midfielder for Belgian Pro League club Gent and the Slovakia national team.

== Early life ==
Bénes was born in Dunajská Streda (a predominantly ethnic Hungarian town) in Slovakia to an ethnic Hungarian family. He has a younger brother named Krisztián, who plays football on an amateur level in Slovak lower divisions.

== Club career ==
Bénes first began with GBS Šamorín in 2007, before moving to DAC Dunajská Streda. He left DAC Dunajská Streda in 2011 to play for Hungarian team ETO Győr. He made one senior appearance for the club, a 2–0 win over Budapest Honvéd on 6 December 2014. He was offered a new contract by ETO Győr in 2015, but rejected it as his release clause was too high, so on 6 February 2015, Bénes signed a three-year deal with Fortuna Liga side MŠK Žilina.

On 1 July 2016, he joined Bundesliga club Borussia Mönchengladbach.

On 28 January 2019, Bénes moved to 2. Bundesliga side Holstein Kiel for the second half of the season. He debuted in an away match against 1. FC Heidenheim, coming on as a substitute for Jonas Meffert in the 68th minute of the match.

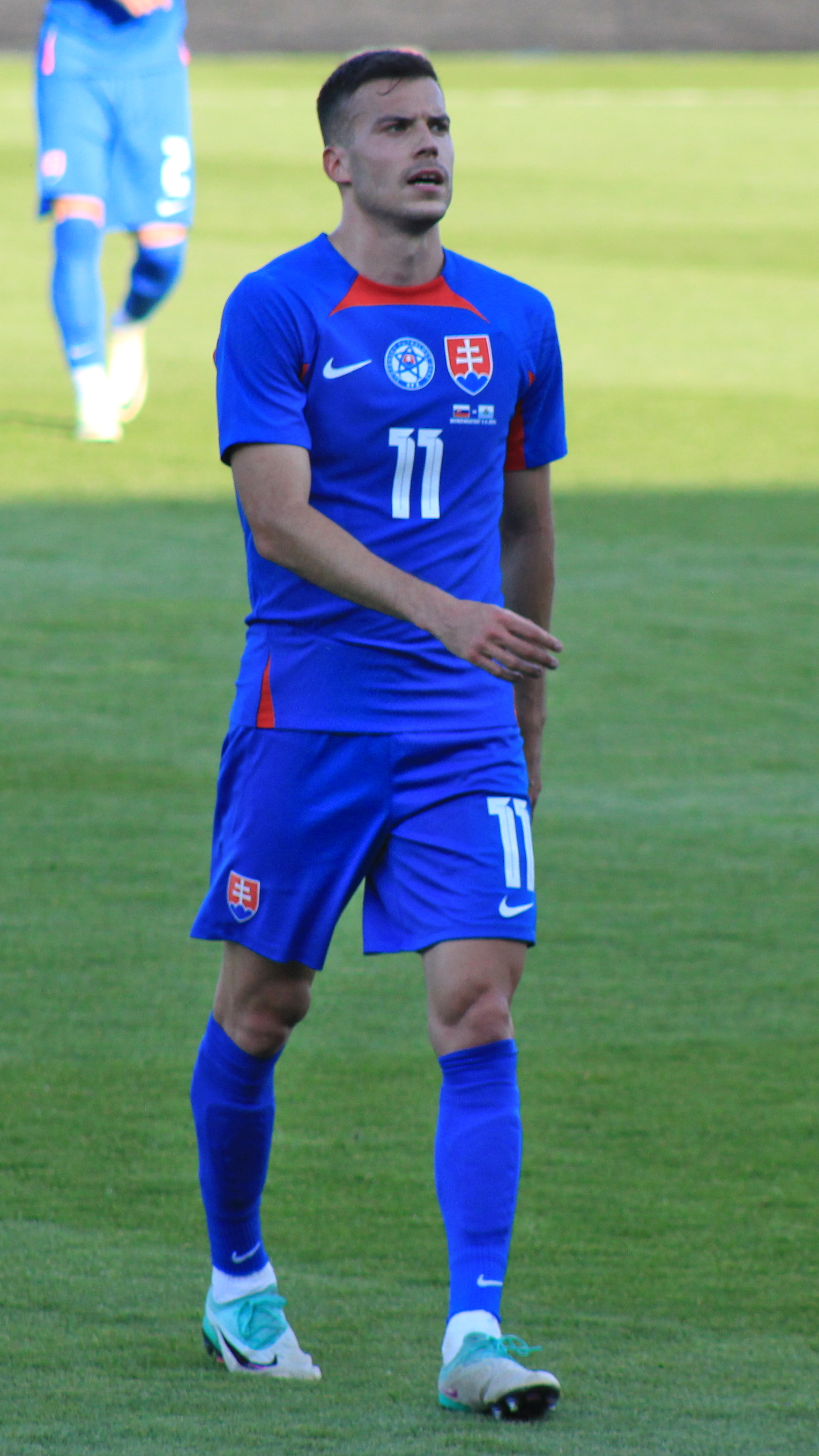
Bénes with Slovakia in 2024

On 1 February 2021, Bénes moved to Bundesliga club FC Augsburg, on a loan deal until the end of the season.

On 21 June 2022, Bénes signed a four-year contract with Hamburger SV.

Whilst representing Slovakia at UEFA Euro 2024, it was announced that Bénes had signed with Union Berlin. The transfer took place after a series of equivalent rumours, with the media-estimated transfer fee at about €5 million.

On 16 August 2025, Bénes was loaned by Kayserispor in Turkey.

== International career ==
Bénes made his international debut as a substitute to Ondrej Duda in the 89th minute of the 2–1 victory against Lithuania. Due to number of prolonged injuries and low playing time in Mönchengladbach, Bénes made no further appearances in the national team under Kozák, who resigned in October 2018.

On 28 May 2019, coach Pavel Hapal called him up for a double fixture in June - a home friendly match against Jordan. Subsequently, the core of the U21 squad became known as Hapal's children, including Bénes.

== Career statistics ==
=== Club ===
As of match played 22 October 2026

Appearances and goals by club, season and competition
Club	Season	League			National cup		League cup		Europe		Total	
Club	Season	Division	Apps	Goals	Apps	Goals	Apps	Goals	Apps	Goals	Apps	Goals
Győr	2014–15	Nemzeti Bajnokság I	1	0	0	0	4	0	0	0	5	0
Žilina	2014–15	Slovak First League	8	0	0	0	–		–		8	0
Žilina	2015–16	Slovak First League	23	2	3	0	–		8	0	34	2
Žilina	Total		31	2	3	0	0	0	8	0	42	2
Žilina II	2014–15	Slovak 2. Liga	6	0	–		–		–		6	0
Borussia Mönchengladbach	2016–17	Bundesliga	8	1	2	0	–		0	0	10	1
Borussia Mönchengladbach	2017–18	Bundesliga	2	0	0	0	–		–		2	0
Borussia Mönchengladbach	2018–19	Bundesliga	1	0	0	0	–		–		1	0
Borussia Mönchengladbach	2019–20	Bundesliga	22	0	2	0	–		4 (Note: Appearances in UEFA Europa League)	0	28	0
Borussia Mönchengladbach	2020–21	Bundesliga	7	0	1	1	–		2 (Note: Appearances in UEFA Champions League)	0	10	1
Borussia Mönchengladbach	2021–22	Bundesliga	13	0	1	0	–		0	0	14	0
Borussia Mönchengladbach	Total		53	1	6	1	–		6	0	65	2
Borussia Mönchengladbach II	2016–17	Regionalliga West	13	1	–		–		–		13	1
Borussia Mönchengladbach II	2017–18	Regionalliga West	1	0	–		–		–		1	0
Borussia Mönchengladbach II	2018–19	Regionalliga West	2	0	–		–		–		2	0
Borussia Mönchengladbach II	Total		16	1	0	0	0	0	0	0	16	1
Holstein Kiel (loan)	2018–19	2. Bundesliga	15	2	1	0	–		–		16	2
FC Augsburg (loan)	2020–21	Bundesliga	12	1	0	0	–		–		12	1
Hamburger SV	2022–23	2. Bundesliga	33	6	1	0	–		–		34	6
Hamburger SV	2023–24	2. Bundesliga	27	13	3	0	–		–		30	13
Hamburger SV	Total		60	19	4	0	–		–		64	19
Union Berlin	2024–25	Bundesliga	23	1	2	0	–		–		25	1
Kayserispor	2025–26	Süper Lig	32	7	0	0	–		–		32	7
Gent	2026–27	Belgian Pro League	4	0	1	0	7 (Note: Appearances in UEFA Conference League)	0	–		12	0
Career total			253	34	17	1	11	0	14	0	296	35

=== International ===
As of match played 5 June 2026

Appearances and goals by national team and year
National team	Year	Apps	Goals
Slovakia	2017	1	0
Slovakia	2019	2	0
Slovakia	2021	4	1
Slovakia	2022	4	0
Slovakia	2023	7	0
Slovakia	2024	12	1
Slovakia	2025	8	0
Slovakia	2026	4	0
Total		42	2

Scores and results list Slovakia's goal tally first, score column indicates score after each Bénes goal.

List of international goals scored by László Bénes
No.	Date	Venue	Opponent	Score	Result	Competition
1	1 June 2021	Keine Sorgen Arena, Ried im Innkreis, Austria	Bulgaria	1–1	1–1	Friendly
2	10 June 2024	Štadión Antona Malatinského, Trnava, Slovakia	Wales	4–0	4–0	Friendly
