= Nico Elvedi =

Swiss footballer (born 1996)

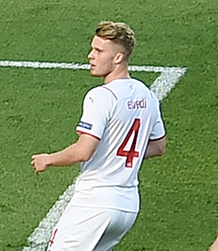
- Elvedi with Switzerland at UEFA Euro 2020

Personal information
- Full name: Nico Elvedi
- Date of birth: 30 September 1996 (age 30)
- Place of birth: Zürich, Switzerland
- Height: 1.87 m (6 ft 2 in)
- Position: Centre-back

Team information
- Current team: Leeds United
- Number: 30

Youth career
- 2005–2006: FC Greifensee
- 2006–2013: Zürich

Senior career*
Years	Team	Apps	(Gls)
2013–2015	Zürich II	24	(0)
2014–2015	Zürich	18	(1)
2015–2026	Borussia Mönchengladbach	318	(15)
2026–	Leeds United	2	(0)

International career^{‡}
2012–2013	Switzerland U17	11	(0)
2014	Switzerland U18	1	(0)
2013–2016	Switzerland U19	19	(2)
2016–	Switzerland	79	(4)
- * Club domestic league appearances and goals as of 17:20, 5 September 2026 (UTC) ‡ National team caps and goals as of 22:15, 16 November 2026 (UTC)

Nico Elvedi (born 30 September 1996) is a Swiss professional footballer who plays as a centre-back for Premier League club Leeds United and the Switzerland national team.

== Club career ==
=== Zürich ===
Born in Zürich, Elvedi was a youth player for local side FC Zürich. He made his Swiss Super League debut on 15 May 2014 in a 1–0 away win against FC Lausanne-Sport, playing the full match.

=== Borussia Mönchengladbach ===
In June 2015, Elvedi joined German Bundesliga side Borussia Mönchengladbach for a €4 million transfer fee. He made his debut for the club on 7 November in a 0–0 draw against FC Ingolstadt 04, where he came on as a substitute for Raffael.

Elvedi scored his first goal in the Bundesliga during the derby against 1. FC Köln on 20 August 2017. The match saw Borussia Mönchengladbach win 1–0.

=== Leeds United ===
On 19 August 2026, Elvedi moved to England and joined Premier League club Leeds United for a fee of €8.5 million.

== International career ==
Elvedi played for various Swiss youth teams, and made his debut for the senior Switzerland side in a 1–2 friendly defeat to Belgium on 28 May 2016.

On 4 June 2018, Elvedi was included in the 23-man Swiss squad for the 2018 FIFA World Cup.

In May 2019, he played in 2019 UEFA Nations League Finals, where the Swiss team finished fourth.

In May 2021, Elvedi was called up to the national team for UEFA Euro 2020, where his country upset favourites France en route to the quarter-finals. In said round, they lost to Spain.

In November 2022, Elvedi was part of Switzerland's 26-man squad for the 2022 FIFA World Cup, where Switzerland were knocked out in the round-of-16 by Portugal in a 6–1 loss.

On 20 May 2026, Elvedi was selected in the 26-man squad for the 2026 FIFA World Cup.

== Personal life ==
Elvedi's twin brother, Jan, is also a professional footballer who plays for 2. Bundesliga club 1. FC Kaiserslautern.

== Career statistics ==
=== Club ===
As of match played 5 September 2026

Appearances and goals by club, season and competition
Club	Season	League			National cup (Note: Includes Swiss Cup, DFB-Pokal)		League cup (Note: Includes EFL Cup)		Europe		Total	
Club	Season	Division	Apps	Goals	Apps	Goals	Apps	Goals	Apps	Goals	Apps	Goals
Zürich	2013–14	Swiss Super League	2	0	0	0	—		—		2	0
Zürich	2014–15	Swiss Super League	16	1	3	0	—		5 (Note: Appearances in UEFA Europa League)	0	24	1
Zürich	Total		18	1	3	0	—		5	0	26	1
Borussia Mönchengladbach	2015–16	Bundesliga	21	0	1	0	—		2 (Note: Appearances in UEFA Champions League)	0	24	0
Borussia Mönchengladbach	2016–17	Bundesliga	25	0	2	0	—		8	0	35	0
Borussia Mönchengladbach	2017–18	Bundesliga	33	2	3	0	—		—		36	2
Borussia Mönchengladbach	2018–19	Bundesliga	30	2	1	0	—		—		31	2
Borussia Mönchengladbach	2019–20	Bundesliga	32	1	2	0	—		5	0	39	1
Borussia Mönchengladbach	2020–21	Bundesliga	29	3	4	1	—		7	1	40	5
Borussia Mönchengladbach	2021–22	Bundesliga	28	1	3	0	—		—		31	1
Borussia Mönchengladbach	2022–23	Bundesliga	32	3	2	0	—		—		34	3
Borussia Mönchengladbach	2023–24	Bundesliga	30	2	3	0	—		—		33	2
Borussia Mönchengladbach	2024–25	Bundesliga	25	1	0	0	—		—		25	1
Borussia Mönchengladbach	2025–26	Bundesliga	33	0	3	2	—		—		36	2
Borussia Mönchengladbach	Total		318	15	24	3	—		21	1	364	19
Leeds United	2026–27	Premier League	2	0	0	0	1	0	—		3	0
Career total			338	16	27	3	1	0	27	1	393	20

=== International ===
As of match played 16 November 2026

Appearances and goals by national team and year
National team	Year	Apps	Goals
Switzerland	2016	3	0
Switzerland	2017	1	0
Switzerland	2018	5	1
Switzerland	2019	8	0
Switzerland	2020	5	0
Switzerland	2021	13	0
Switzerland	2022	8	0
Switzerland	2023	7	0
Switzerland	2024	6	1
Switzerland	2025	7	1
Switzerland	2026	16	1
Total		79	4

Scores and results list Switzerland's goal tally first, score column indicates score after each Elvedi goal.

List of international goals scored by Nico Elvedi
No.	Date	Venue	Opponent	Score	Result	Competition
1	18 November 2018	Swissporarena, Lucerne, Switzerland	Belgium	4–2	5–2	2018–19 UEFA Nations League A
2	4 June 2024	Swissporarena, Lucerne, Switzerland	Estonia	3–0	4–0	Friendly
3	8 September 2025	St. Jakob-Park, Basel, Switzerland	Slovenia	1–0	3–0	2026 FIFA World Cup qualification
4	29 September 2026	Hampden Park, Glasgow, Scotland	Scotland	2–0	3–0	2026–27 UEFA Nations League B
