= Sascha Korb =

German footballer (born 1993)

Personal information
- Full name: Sascha Korb
- Date of birth: 18 June 1993 (age 33)
- Place of birth: Offenbach am Main, Germany
- Height: 1.74 m (5 ft 9 in)
- Position: Midfielder

Team information
- Current team: Kickers Offenbach II

Youth career
- 1997–2012: Kickers Offenbach

Senior career*
Years	Team	Apps	(Gls)
2012–2016	Kickers Offenbach II	24	(1)
2013–2016	Kickers Offenbach	73	(0)
2016–2018	Hessen Kassel	52	(8)
2018	Hessen Kassel II	1	(0)
2018–2019	Wormatia Worms	28	(2)
2018–2020	Schweinfurt 05	22	(3)
2020–2021	SC Verl	20	(1)
2021–2023	VfR Aalen	39	(2)
2023–2026	Kickers Offenbach	29	(1)
2023–	Kickers Offenbach II	5	(0)
- * Club domestic league appearances and goals as of 26 June 2026

Sascha Korb (born 18 June 1993) is a German professional footballer who plays as a midfielder for Kickers Offenbach II.

== Career ==
Korb made his professional debut for Kickers Offenbach in the 3. Liga on 13 April 2013, coming on as a substitute in the 68th minute for Jan Washausen in a 1–0 home loss against Preußen Münster.
