= Mahmoud Dahoud =

Footballer (born 1996)

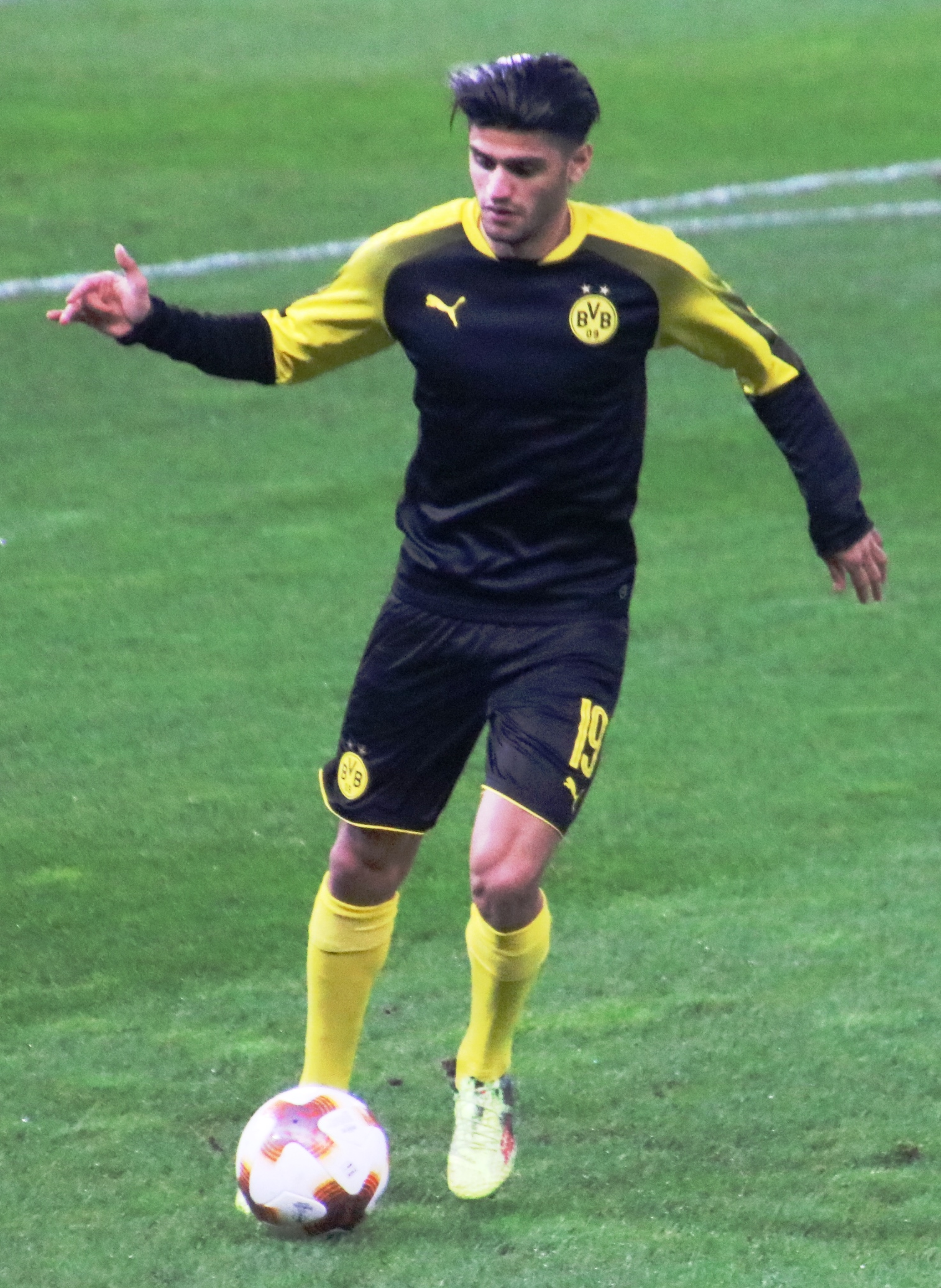
- Dahoud with Borussia Dortmund in 2018

Personal information
- Full name: Mahmoud Dahoud
- Date of birth: 1 January 1996 (age 30)
- Place of birth: Amuda, Syria
- Height: 1.78 m (5 ft 10 in)
- Position: Defensive midfielder

Team information
- Current team: United
- Number: 81

Youth career
- Germania Reusrath
- Fortuna Düsseldorf
- 2010–2014: Borussia Mönchengladbach

Senior career*
Years	Team	Apps	(Gls)
2014–2015	Borussia Mönchengladbach II	14	(2)
2014–2017	Borussia Mönchengladbach	61	(7)
2017–2023	Borussia Dortmund	101	(4)
2023–2024	Brighton & Hove Albion	9	(0)
2024	→ VfB Stuttgart (loan)	13	(1)
2024–2026	Eintracht Frankfurt	24	(3)
2026–	United	2	(1)

International career^{‡}
2014	Germany U18	1	(0)
2014–2016	Germany U19	3	(0)
2016–2019	Germany U21	22	(4)
2020	Germany	2	(0)
2026–	Syria	2	(0)
Medal record
Representing Germany
UEFA European Under-21 Championship
Winner	2017
Runner-up	2019
- * Club domestic league appearances and goals as of 8 November 2026 ‡ National team caps and goals as of 18 November 2026

Mahmoud Dahoud (Note: Kurdish: مەحمود داود, romanized: Mehmud Dawud Arabic: محمود داهود) (born 1 January 1996) is a Syrian professional footballer who plays as a defensive midfielder for UAE Pro League club United. Born in Syria, he played for the Germany national team before switching allegiance to Syria in 2026.

Dahoud made his debut for Bundesliga club Borussia Mönchengladbach in 2014, making 86 appearances before signing for Borussia Dortmund three years later.

Dahoud represented Germany internationally at U18, U19, U21, and senior levels. He was part of the U21 side that won the 2017 UEFA European Under-21 Championship.

== Club career ==
=== Borussia Mönchengladbach ===
Mahmoud Dahoud began his career playing at junior level for the Langenfeld football club Germania Reusrath and Fortuna Düsseldorf before signing for Gladbach at the age of 14 in 2010. He then spent the next five seasons developing in Gladbach's academy before breaking into the first team in 2014.

==== 2014–15 season ====
On 27 August 2014, Dahoud was handed his first team debut by manager Lucien Favre in a 7–0 Europa League play-off win over FK Sarajevo, coming off the bench in the 55th minute to replace Christoph Kramer. Just a week prior to making his first appearance for Gladbach, Dahoud had signed his first professional contract, agreeing a deal to keep him at the club until June 2018. He only made two more senior appearances over the course of the season, one in the Europa League against Apollon and the other at the end of the season against Borussia Dortmund to make his Bundesliga debut. Upon making his debut, Dahoud became the first Syrian-born player to ever play in the Bundesliga.

==== 2015–16 season ====
Following the sacking of Favre early in the 2015–16 Bundesliga season, Dahoud saw his game time increase with "Die Fohlen", establishing himself as a key figure in new manager André Schubert's midfield. He scored his first goal for the club on 23 September 2015 in Schubert's debut game in charge, netting Gladbach's fourth goal in a 4–2 win over Augsburg. The week prior to Favre's departure, Dahoud made his Champions League debut against Sevilla from the bench before making his full debut against Manchester City under Schubert later in the month. The immediate impact made by Dahoud in his new starting berth was recognized by the supporters who voted him as the Fans' Player of the Month for September. In October, he received a standing ovation from the Eintracht Frankfurt supporters after delivering an all-conquering performance against their side, scoring once and setting up another two in a 5–1 win. The following year, on Valentine's Day, Dahoud netted the match winning goal in the Rhine Derby against Köln. At the conclusion of the season, Dahoud had made 32 league appearances, scoring 5 goals and assisting 9 as Gladbach ended fourth in the Bundesliga, thereby qualifying for the 2016–17 UEFA Champions League qualifiers.

==== 2016–17 season ====
In August 2016, Dahoud's agent revealed that he had rejected a new contract with Gladbach based on the understanding that he would be allowed to leave the club at the end of the season. This followed strong reports that Premier League side Liverpool and reigning Ligue 1 champions Paris Saint-Germain had approached Gladbach for his signature. He made his first appearance of the season on 20 August in a 1–0 DFB Pokal win over SV Drochtersen/Assel. He scored his first goal of the season on 26 November, netting the opener in Gladbach's 1–1 Bundesliga draw with Hoffenheim. On 16 March 2017, he scored his first ever goal in European competitions, scoring Gladbach's second in a 2–2 Europa League draw with fellow Bundesliga side Schalke. Dahoud's goal, which had put Gladbach 2–0 up at half-time, was not enough to secure his club's progression, however, as a late rally from Schalke saw Gladbach knocked of the competition on the away goals rule.

With only a year left to run on his contract, Gladbach announced on 30 March that Dahoud would be joining fellow Bundesliga side Borussia Dortmund at the end of the season for a reported fee of €12m. He ultimately played in 41 matches for the campaign, though he was jeered by Gladbach supporters in his latter appearances due to his impending departure, as the club ended the season in ninth position.

=== Borussia Dortmund ===
==== 2017–18 season ====
Dahoud officially joined Borussia Dortmund on 1 July 2017. Dortmund's sporting director Michael Zorc commented, "Mo Dahoud is a highly-talented and exciting central midfield player who we have been keeping very close tabs on for several years now. He has already proven that he can cut it at the highest level." He made his debut for the club on 6 August, starting in a penalty shootout loss to Bayern Munich in the DFL-Supercup. On 12 August 2017, Dahoud assisted Pierre-Emerick Aubameyang in netting BVB's third goal in Dortmund's 4–0 cup win against sixth-tier club 1. FC Rielasingen-Arlen.

==== 2018–19 season ====
On 26 August 2018, Dahoud scored his first Bundesliga goal for his club in a 4–1 victory over RB Leipzig. He was used sparingly by manager Lucien Favre during the first half of the season, however, with new signings Thomas Delaney and Axel Witsel preferred in midfield.

==== 2019–20 season ====
Dahoud had a difficult season due to injury, lack of consistency and the competitive situation in the Dortmund midfield, in which he featured in 14 matches in all competitions.

==== 2020–21 season ====
On 17 February 2021, he scored his first Champions League goal in a 3–2 away win over Sevilla in the 2020–21 UEFA Champions League round of 16. On 13 May 2021, Dahoud started in the 2021 DFB-Pokal final against RB Leipzig. He won his second trophy with Borussia Dortmund after winning the final, contributing with an assist to a Jadon Sancho goal in the 5th minute.

==== 2021–22 season ====
Throughout the 2021–22 Bundesliga season, Dahoud made 22 appearances and secured a place among the league's top 15 central midfielders for completed passes, forward passes, and total touches per matches.

==== 2022–23 season ====
On 29 May 2023, Dortmund officially announced the departure of five players, including Dahoud.

=== Brighton & Hove Albion ===
On 16 June 2023, it was officially announced that Dahoud would join Premier League side Brighton & Hove Albion on a free transfer from 1 July on, signing a four-year contract with the English club. He made his Albion debut on 12 August, in the opening game of the season, starting the match and playing 74 minutes of the 4–1 home win over newly promoted Luton Town.

==== Loan to VfB Stuttgart ====
On 1 February 2024, Dahoud returned to Germany as he joined VfB Stuttgart on loan for the remainder of the season. On 17 February, he scored his first goal in a 2–1 away victory over Darmstadt.

=== Eintracht Frankfurt ===
On 30 August 2024, Dahoud left Brighton & Hove Albion and joined Eintracht Frankfurt on a permanent basis on a two-year contract.

== International career ==
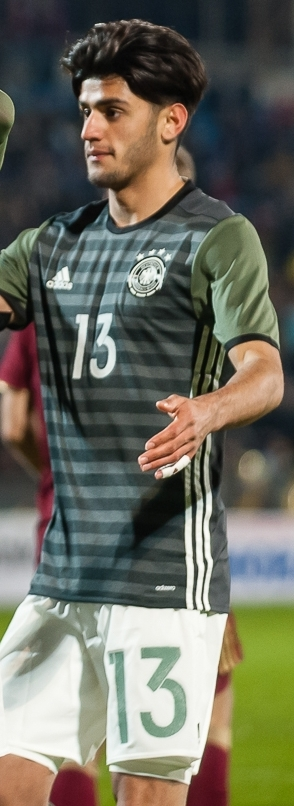
Dahoud with Germany U21 in 2016

=== Germany ===
Having previously represented Germany at U18 and U19 level, Dahoud made his debut for the Germany U21 team as a substitute in a 4–1 win over the Faroe Islands on 24 March 2016, before making his full debut a week later against Russia. The following year, he was included in Germany's 23-man squad for the 2017 UEFA European Under-21 Championship in Poland. Germany were ultimately crowned champions, beating Spain 1–0 in the final to claim the title. Dahoud is also eligible to represent Syria, though he stated that he was not interested in doing so, and that he dreamed of playing for Germany.

Dahoud made his debut for the German senior team on 7 October 2020 against Turkey in a friendly.

=== Syria ===
In March 2024, Dahoud was called up to the Syria national football team for 2026 FIFA World Cup qualification matches against Myanmar. Hours before their World Cup qualifier against Myanmar on 26 March 2024, Dahoud left the Syrian team camp due to his reported dissatisfaction with the conditions and unfulfilled promises of the Syrian FA, meanwhile the latter stated that he left because they were unable to fulfill his demands conveyed by his agent.

=== Allegiance to Germany and return to Syria ===
After not making an appearance for the Syrian national team, Dahoud announced in September 2024 his intent to switch allegiance back to Germany, stating, "I grew up in Germany and would love to play for my home country. If I can offer up some performances and get a call up, I would be delighted."

On 31 March 2025, the Syrian FA stated an agreement had been reached with Dahoud for his return to the Syrian national team beginning with their following match in June 2025 against Afghanistan in the 2027 AFC Asian Cup qualifiers. However, he was eventually not named in Syria's squad for the June match against Afghanistan.

== Personal life ==
Dahoud was born in Amuda, a town in northeast Syria, and is of Kurdish descent. He was taken to Germany by his parents in 1996, who fled from the Assad regime. In an interview with the official Bundesliga website, he revealed that his footballing idol is French legend Zinedine Zidane. He has spoken German and Arabic since childhood.

Following the fall of the Assad regime in December 2024, Dahoud posted on social media that he was a "son and brother of the Syrian people and Syria" and congratulated his country and people for achieving "a victorious and free Syria for all."

== Career statistics ==
=== Club ===
As of match played 16 May 2026

Appearances and goals by club, season and competition
Club	Season	League			National cup (Note: Includes DFB-Pokal)		League cup (Note: Includes EFL Cup)		Europe		Other		Total	
Club	Season	Division	Apps	Goals	Apps	Goals	Apps	Goals	Apps	Goals	Apps	Goals	Apps	Goals
Borussia Mönchengladbach II	2014–15	Regionalliga West	14	2	—		—		—		—		14	2
Borussia Mönchengladbach	2014–15	Bundesliga	1	0	0	0	—		2 (Note: Appearances in UEFA Europa League)	0	—		3	0
Borussia Mönchengladbach	2015–16	Bundesliga	32	5	3	0	—		6 (Note: Appearances in UEFA Champions League)	0	—		41	5
Borussia Mönchengladbach	2016–17	Bundesliga	28	2	5	0	—		9 (Note: Five appearances in UEFA Champions League, four appearances and one goal in UEFA Europa League)	1	—		42	3
Borussia Mönchengladbach	Total		61	7	8	0	—		17	1	—		86	8
Borussia Dortmund	2017–18	Bundesliga	23	0	3	0	—		7 (Note: Three appearances in UEFA Champions League, four appearances in UEFA Europa League)	0	1 (Note: Appearance in DFL-Supercup)	0	34	0
Borussia Dortmund	2018–19	Bundesliga	14	1	3	0	—		5	0	—		22	1
Borussia Dortmund	2019–20	Bundesliga	12	0	0	0	—		2	0	0	0	14	0
Borussia Dortmund	2020–21	Bundesliga	21	1	3	0	—		6	1	1	0	31	2
Borussia Dortmund	2021–22	Bundesliga	22	2	1	0	—		6 (Note: Four appearances in UEFA Champions League, two appearances in UEFA Europa League)	0	1	0	30	2
Borussia Dortmund	2022–23	Bundesliga	9	0	1	0	—		0	0	—		10	0
Borussia Dortmund	Total		101	4	11	0	—		26	1	3	0	141	5
Brighton & Hove Albion	2023–24	Premier League	9	0	0	0	1	0	4	0	—		14	0
VfB Stuttgart (loan)	2023–24	Bundesliga	13	1	1	0	—		—		—		14	1
Eintracht Frankfurt	2024–25	Bundesliga	9	1	1	0	—		8	0	—		18	1
Eintracht Frankfurt	2025–26	Bundesliga	15	2	0	0	—		4	0	—		19	2
Eintracht Frankfurt	Total		24	3	1	0	—		12	0	—		37	3
Career total			222	17	21	0	1	0	59	2	3	0	306	19

=== International ===
As of match played 11 November 2020

Appearances and goals by national team and year
National team	Year	Apps	Goals
Germany	2020	2	0
Total		2	0

== Honours ==
Borussia Dortmund

- DFB-Pokal: 2020–21
- DFL-Supercup: 2019

Germany U21

- UEFA European Under-21 Championship: 2017
