= André Hahn =

German footballer

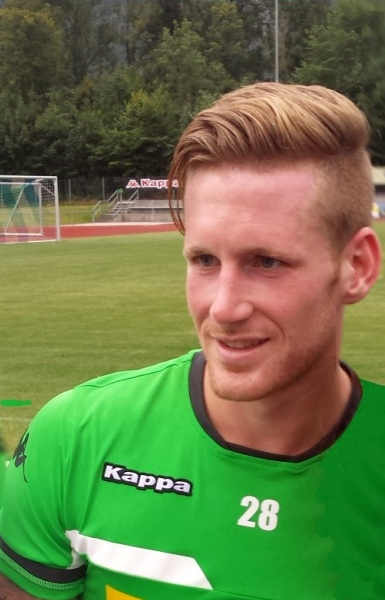
- Hahn with Borussia Mönchengladbach in 2015

Personal information
- Date of birth: 13 August 1990 (age 36)
- Place of birth: Otterndorf, West Germany
- Height: 1.85 m (6 ft 1 in)
- Position: Forward

Youth career
- 1997–2003: TSV Otterndorf
- 2003–2005: LTS Bremerhaven
- 2005–2007: Rot-Weiss Cuxhaven
- 2008: FC Bremerhaven

Senior career*
| Years | Team | Apps | (Gls) |
| 2008–2010 | Hamburger SV II | 38 | (2) |
| 2010–2011 | FC Oberneuland | 16 | (2) |
| 2011 | TuS Koblenz | 15 | (8) |
| 2011–2013 | Kickers Offenbach | 42 | (5) |
| 2013–2014 | FC Augsburg | 48 | (12) |
| 2014–2017 | Borussia Mönchengladbach | 68 | (14) |
| 2017–2018 | Hamburger SV | 23 | (3) |
| 2018–2023 | FC Augsburg | 111 | (20) |
| Total | | 361 | (66) |

International career
| 2014 | Germany | 1 | (0) |
- * Club domestic league appearances and goals

André Hahn (born 13 August 1990) is a German former professional footballer who plays as a winger and forward.

== Club career ==
=== Hamburger SV ===
Hahn began his career with Hamburger SV II, who he joined in 2008.

=== FC Oberneuland ===
Two years later, he signed for FC Oberneuland where he made an immediate impact, scoring eight goals in fifteen matches in the first half of the 2010–11 season.

=== TuS Koblenz ===
In January 2011 he earned a move to TuS Koblenz of the 3. Liga. He made his Koblenz debut as a substitute for Thomas Klasen in a 3–2 win over Rot-Weiss Ahlen, and made another fifteen appearances as the club finished 11th. However, Koblenz withdrew from the 3. Liga due to financial difficulties, led Hahn to leave the club.

=== Kickers Offenbach ===
He was then snapped up by Kickers Offenbach, another club competing in the third tier.

=== FC Augsburg ===
After a successful eighteen months with Offenbach, André signed for FC Augsburg of the Bundesliga in January 2013. He quickly established his place, starting 12 matches in the second half of the 2012–13 season and finally helped keep FC Augsburg from getting relegated to 2. Bundesliga.

Hahn further cemented his role in the 2013–14 season by his eye catching performance. He contributed 6 goals for FC Augsburg before the winter break.

=== Borussia Mönchengladbach ===
In March 2014 he was signed by Bundesliga side Borussia Mönchengladbach and he officially joined the club in the summer.

=== Hamburger SV ===
André Hahn returned to Hamburger SV, a club he played for in his youth, before the 2017–18 season.

=== FC Augsburg (second spell) ===
Hahn rejoined former Augsburg for an undisclosed fee on 30 May 2018, signing a four-year deal until 2022. Speaking about his transfer, Hahn said: "I'm happy to be back in Augsburg as I feel very at ease here and have much to thank the club for. The club has once again placed its trust in me, and I'd like to repay that the club, all the management and the fans for that."

== International career ==
Hahn had never played for Germany youth teams, but due to his eye-catching performance, he received a call up to the Germany national team for a friendly match against Chile on 5 March 2014. Hahn was named in the 30-man provisional squad for 2014 World Cup in Brazil by the German coach Joachim Löw on 8 May 2014.

== Career statistics ==
Appearances and goals by club, season and competition
| Club | Season | League | | | Cup | | Continental | | Total | | Ref. |
| Club | Season | League | Apps | Goals | Apps | Goals | Apps | Goals | Apps | Goals | Ref. |
|---|---|---|---|---|---|---|---|---|---|---|---|
| Hamburger SV II | 2008–09 | Regionalliga Nord | 15 | 1 | — | | — | | 15 | 1 | |
| Hamburger SV II | 2009–10 | Regionalliga Nord | 24 | 1 | — | | — | | 24 | 1 | |
| Hamburger SV II | Total | | 39 | 2 | 0 | 0 | 0 | 0 | 39 | 2 | — |
| FC Oberneuland | 2010–11 | 3. Liga | 16 | 2 | 1 | 0 | — | | 17 | 2 | |
| TuS Koblenz | 2010–11 | Regionalliga Nord | 15 | 8 | — | | — | | 15 | 8 | |
| Kickers Offenbach | 2011–12 | 3. Liga | 31 | 3 | — | | — | | 31 | 3 | |
| Kickers Offenbach | 2012–13 | 3. Liga | 11 | 2 | 2 | 0 | — | | 13 | 2 | |
| Kickers Offenbach | Total | | 42 | 5 | 2 | 0 | 0 | 0 | 44 | 5 | — |
| FC Augsburg | 2012–13 | Bundesliga | 16 | 0 | 0 | 0 | — | | 16 | 0 | |
| FC Augsburg | 2013–14 | Bundesliga | 32 | 12 | 3 | 0 | — | | 35 | 12 | |
| FC Augsburg | Total | | 48 | 12 | 3 | 0 | 0 | 0 | 51 | 12 | — |
| Borussia Mönchengladbach | 2014–15 | Bundesliga | 23 | 3 | 4 | 1 | 5 | 2 | 32 | 6 | |
| Borussia Mönchengladbach | 2015–16 | Bundesliga | 15 | 8 | 0 | 0 | 3 | 0 | 18 | 8 | |
| Borussia Mönchengladbach | 2016–17 | Bundesliga | 30 | 3 | 5 | 0 | 10 | 2 | 44 | 5 | |
| Borussia Mönchengladbach | Total | | 68 | 14 | 9 | 1 | 18 | 4 | 94 | 19 | — |
| Hamburger SV | 2017–18 | Bundesliga | 23 | 3 | 1 | 0 | — | | 24 | 3 | |
| Career total | | | 251 | 46 | 16 | 1 | 18 | 4 | 285 | 51 | — |
