= Djibril Sow =

Swiss footballer (born 1997)

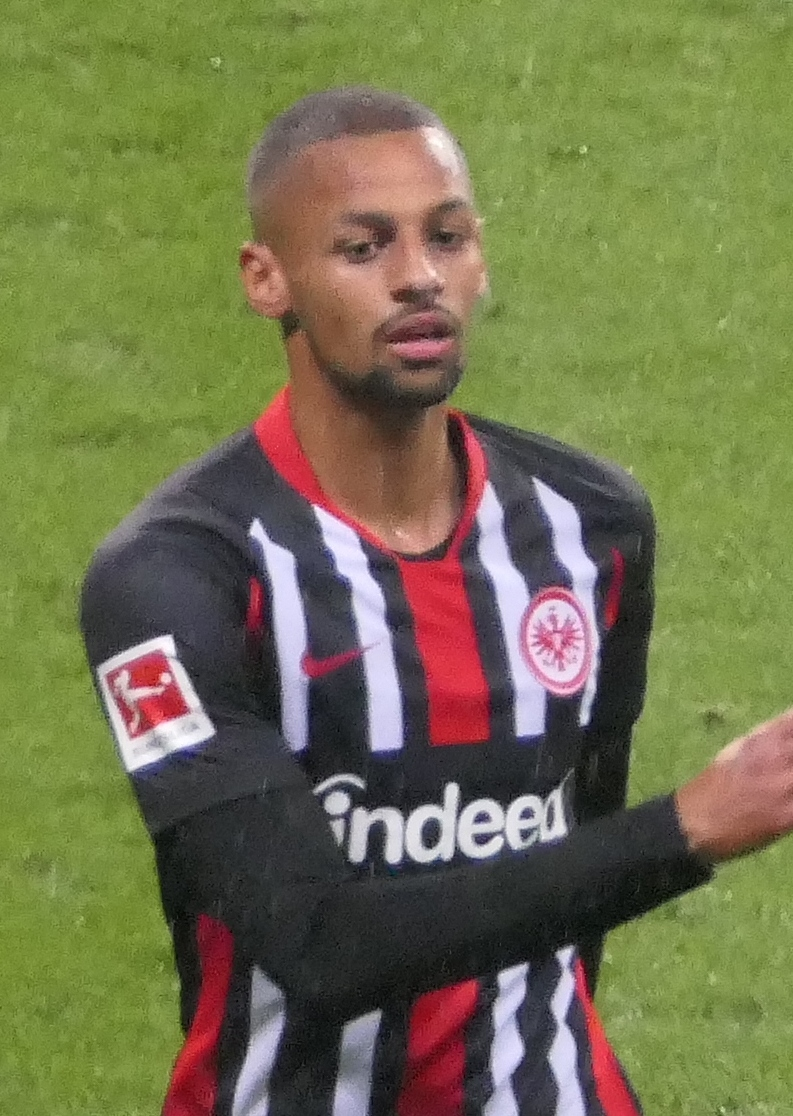
- Sow playing for Eintracht Frankfurt in 2019

Personal information
- Full name: Mohameth Djibril Ibrahima Sow
- Date of birth: 6 February 1997 (age 29)
- Place of birth: Zürich, Switzerland
- Height: 1.84 m (6 ft 0 in)
- Position: Midfielder

Team information
- Current team: Genoa
- Number: 97

Youth career
- 2007–2008: BC Albisrieden
- 2008–2015: Zürich

Senior career*
Years	Team	Apps	(Gls)
2014–2015	Zürich II	20	(0)
2015–2017	Borussia Mönchengladbach II	31	(6)
2016–2017	Borussia Mönchengladbach	1	(0)
2017–2019	Young Boys	55	(4)
2019–2023	Eintracht Frankfurt	120	(7)
2023–2026	Sevilla	87	(8)
2026–	Genoa	5	(0)

International career^{‡}
2013	Switzerland U16	4	(0)
2013–2014	Switzerland U17	14	(0)
2014–2016	Switzerland U19	15	(1)
2016	Switzerland U20	4	(2)
2016	Switzerland U21	6	(1)
2018–	Switzerland	61	(0)
- * Club domestic league appearances and goals as of 20 September 2026 ‡ National team caps and goals as of 22:30, 16 November 2026 (UTC)

Mohameth Djibril Ibrahima Sow (born 6 February 1997) is a Swiss professional footballer who plays as a midfielder for Serie A club Genoa and the Switzerland national team.

== Club career ==
=== Borussia Mönchengladbach ===
Sow made his professional debut for Borussia Mönchengladbach on 25 October 2016, in the second round of the 2016–17 edition of the DFB-Pokal, against second-division club VfB Stuttgart. Sow was substituted on in the 88th minute for Lars Stindl. The match finished as a 2–0 home win for Gladbach.

=== Young Boys ===
In June 2017, Sow returned to Switzerland, agreeing to a four-year contract with Young Boys. The transfer fee paid to Borussia Mönchengladbach was reported as €1.7 million.

He was part of the Young Boys squad that won the 2017–18 Swiss Super League, their first league title in 32 years.

=== Eintracht Frankfurt ===
On 27 June 2019, Sow signed to Bundesliga club Eintracht Frankfurt a contract until 2024.

=== Sevilla ===
On 4 August 2023, Sow moved to La Liga club Sevilla for a fee €10 million and signed a five-year contract.

=== Genoa ===
On 6 August 2026, Sow moved to Italian Serie A club Genoa, signing a multi-year contract.

== International career ==
Born in Switzerland, his father comes from Senegal and his mother is Swiss. He earned his first appearance for the Switzerland national team on 8 September 2018, coming on as a substitute for Steven Zuber in a 6–0 win against Iceland in the UEFA Nations League. In May 2019, he played in 2019 UEFA Nations League Finals, where his team finished fourth. In 2021 he was called up to the national team for the 2020 UEFA European Championship, where the team created one of the main sensations of the tournament reaching the quarter-finals.

On 20 May 2026, Sow was selected in the 26-man squad for the 2026 FIFA World Cup.

== Career statistics ==
=== Club ===
As of match played 23 May 2026

Appearances and goals by club, season and competition
Club	Season	League			National cup (Note: Includes DFB-Pokal, Swiss Cup, Copa del Rey)		Europe		Other		Total	
Club	Season	Division	Apps	Goals	Apps	Goals	Apps	Goals	Apps	Goals	Apps	Goals
Borussia Mönchengladbach II	2015–16	Regionalliga West	15	3	—		—		—		15	3
Borussia Mönchengladbach II	2016–17	Regionalliga West	16	3	—		—		—		16	3
Borussia Mönchengladbach II	Total		31	6	—		—		—		31	6
Borussia Mönchengladbach	2016–17	Bundesliga	1	0	2	0	0	0	—		3	0
Young Boys	2017–18	Swiss Super League	27	1	4	0	6 (Note: Two appearances in UEFA Champions League, four appearances in UEFA Europa League)	0	—		37	1
Young Boys	2018–19	Swiss Super League	28	3	3	0	8 (Note: Appearances in UEFA Champions League)	0	—		39	3
Young Boys	Total		55	4	7	0	14	0	—		76	4
Eintracht Frankfurt	2019–20	Bundesliga	29	1	2	0	9 (Note: Appearances in UEFA Europa League)	0	—		40	1
Eintracht Frankfurt	2020–21	Bundesliga	28	0	1	0	0	0	—		29	0
Eintracht Frankfurt	2021–22	Bundesliga	31	2	1	0	12	1	—		44	3
Eintracht Frankfurt	2022–23	Bundesliga	32	4	6	0	8	0	1 (Note: Appearance in UEFA Super Cup)	0	47	4
Eintracht Frankfurt	Total		120	7	10	0	29	1	1	0	160	8
Sevilla	2023–24	La Liga	24	1	3	0	6	0	0	0	33	1
Sevilla	2024–25	La Liga	30	2	2	0	—		—		32	2
Sevilla	2025–26	La Liga	33	5	2	0	—		—		35	5
Sevilla	Total		87	8	7	0	6	0	0	0	100	8
Career total			294	25	26	0	49	1	1	0	370	26

=== International ===
As of match played 16 November 2026

Appearances and goals by national team and year
National team	Year	Apps	Goals
Switzerland	2018	2	0
Switzerland	2019	4	0
Switzerland	2020	7	0
Switzerland	2021	11	0
Switzerland	2022	12	0
Switzerland	2023	5	0
Switzerland	2024	0	0
Switzerland	2025	8	0
Switzerland	2026	12	0
Total		61	0

== Personal life ==
Sow was born to a Senegalese father and Swiss mother. Sow is the cousin of the female footballer Coumba Sow.

== Honours ==
Young Boys

- Swiss Super League: 2017–18, 2018–19

Eintracht Frankfurt

- UEFA Europa League: 2021–22

Individual

- Swiss Super League Young Footballer of the Year: 2018–19
- Swiss Super League Team of the Year: 2018–19
