= Roberto Rodríguez (footballer) =

Swiss footballer (born 1990)

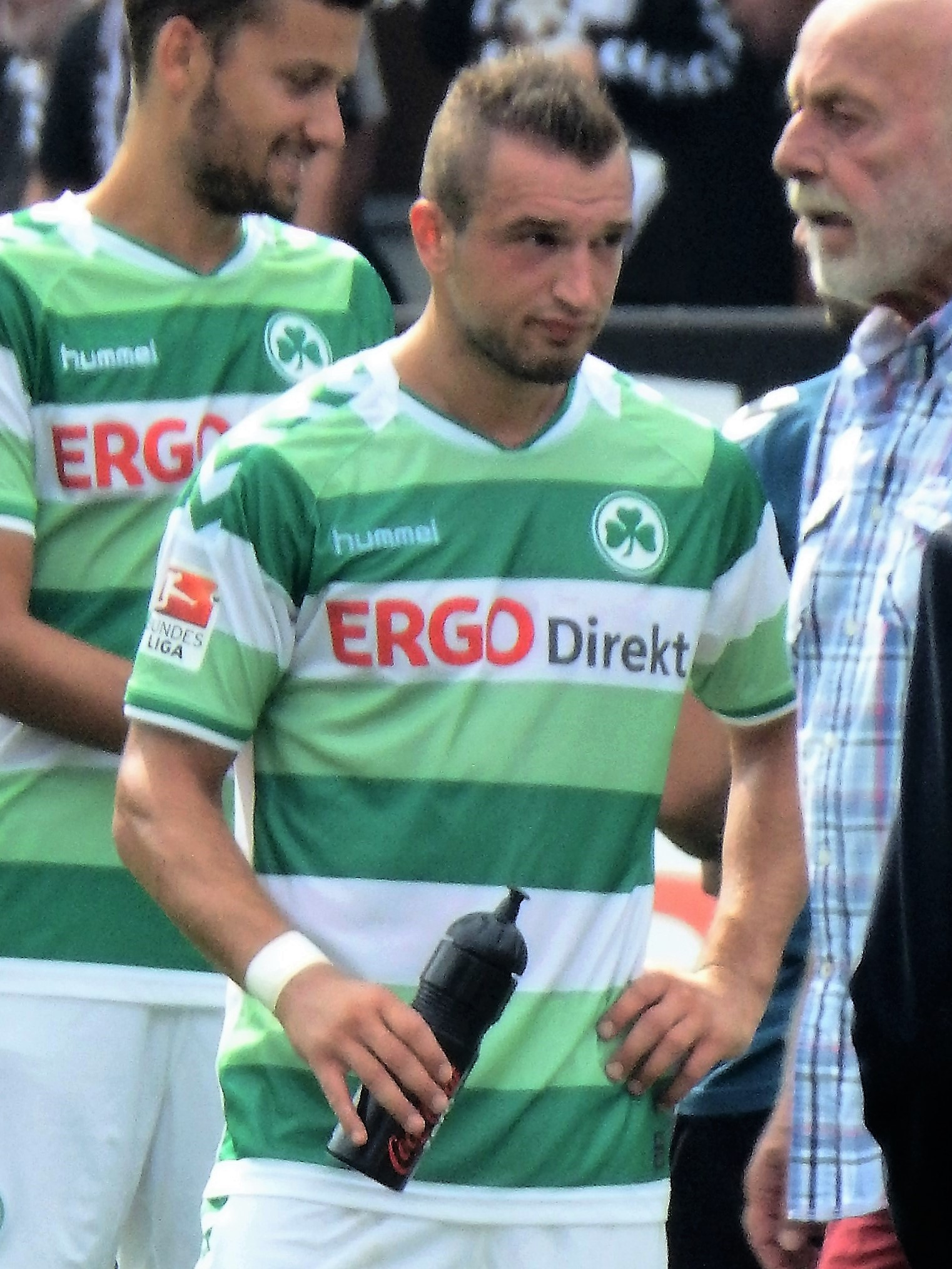
- Rodríguez with Greuther Fürth in 2015

Personal information
- Full name: Roberto Rodríguez Araya
- Date of birth: 28 July 1990 (age 36)
- Place of birth: Zürich, Switzerland
- Height: 1.80 m (5 ft 11 in)
- Position: Midfielder

Team information
- Current team: Schaffhausen

Senior career*
Years	Team	Apps	(Gls)
2009–2011	Wil	54	(4)
2011–2013	Bellinzona	23	(8)
2013–2015	St. Gallen	58	(11)
2015–2016	Novara	11	(1)
2016	→ Greuther Fürth (loan)	4	(0)
2016–2019	FC Zürich	69	(16)
2019–2020	KFC Uerdingen 05	43	(5)
2020–2021	Schaffhausen	10	(1)
2021–	FC Zürich U21	59	(9)

International career^{‡}
2009–2011	Switzerland U-20	2	(0)
- * Club domestic league appearances and goals as of 23 June 2020 ‡ National team caps and goals as of 19 December 2013

Roberto Rodríguez Araya (born 28 July 1990) is a Swiss professional footballer who plays as a midfielder for FC Zürich U21. He holds both Swiss and Spanish citizenships.

He is the older brother of fellow professional footballers Ricardo and Francisco.
