= Tobias Strobl =

German footballer (born 1990)

Personal information
- Date of birth: 12 May 1990 (age 36)
- Place of birth: Munich-Pasing, West Germany
- Height: 1.88 m (6 ft 2 in)
- Positions: Defender; midfielder

Youth career
- 1996–2001: SV Aubing
- 2001–2008: TSV 1860 München

Senior career*
Years	Team	Apps	(Gls)
2008–2011	TSV 1860 München II	59	(1)
2011–2012	TSG 1899 Hoffenheim II	26	(5)
2012–2016	TSG 1899 Hoffenheim	86	(1)
2012–2013	→ 1. FC Köln (loan)	21	(1)
2016–2020	Borussia Mönchengladbach	66	(0)
2020–2023	FC Augsburg	34	(0)
- * Club domestic league appearances and goals as of 6 July 2023

Tobias Strobl (born 12 May 1990) is a retired German professional footballer who played as a defender and midfielder.

== Club career ==
Strobl was born in Munich-Pasing, and made his Bundesliga debut for 1899 Hoffenheim on 11 February 2012 in a 1–1 away draw with Werder Bremen.

On 5 June 2020, Strobl agreed on a free transfer with FC Augsburg at the end of the season. He left Borussia Mönchengladbach having made 83 appearances and recording eight assists.
