= Tsiy-William Ndenge =

German footballer

Personal information
- Date of birth: 13 June 1997 (age 29)
- Place of birth: Cologne, Germany
- Height: 1.88 m (6 ft 2 in)
- Position: Midfielder

Team information
- Current team: Lion City Sailors
- Number: 6

Youth career
- –2004: BSC Bliesheim
- 2004–2012: Bayer Leverkusen
- 2012–2013: TSC Euskirchen
- 2013–2015: Borussia Mönchengladbach

Senior career*
Years	Team	Apps	(Gls)
2015–2018	Borussia Mönchengladbach II	37	(5)
2016–2018	Borussia Mönchengladbach	0	(0)
2017–2018	→ Roda JC (loan)	32	(2)
2018–2022	Luzern	39	(0)
2022–2025	Grasshopper	85	(15)
2025–	Lion City Sailors	20	(2)

International career
2015–2016	Germany U19	3	(0)
2016–2017	Germany U20	6	(0)
- * Club domestic league appearances and goals as of 17 May 2026

Tsiy-William Ndenge (born 13 June 1997), better known as Tsiy Ndenge, is a German professional footballer who plays primarily as a central-midfielder for Singapore Premier League club Lion City Sailors (LCS). Primarily a central-midfielder, he is also capable of playing either as a defensive-midfielder or left-midfielder.

== Club career ==
A youth product of Borussia Mönchengladbach, Ndenge represented their reserve squad in the Regionalliga West, in the German fourth tier, as well as Eredivisie side Roda JC on loan in the 2017–18 season. On 1 October 2017, he scored his first career goal in a 2–1 win over Sparta Rotterdam.

On 31 August 2018, Ndenge moved to FC Luzern for a reported 650,000 CHF and collected 44 caps for Luzern in the Swiss Super League . In his final season at Luzern, he barely saw any play anymore, making only six appearances in the league.

=== Grasshopper ===
On 30 June 2022, Ndenge signed for Grasshopper on a free transfer. In his first official game for Grasshoppers, he was nominated to the starting lineup in a 2–1 win over Lugano on 24 July 2022. On 6 August 2022, he scored his first goal for the Grasshoppers, with a shot from 20 meters, equalizing the game mere seconds before the half-time break. He scored a second goal in the same game in the 69th minute for the 3–2 winner over St. Gallen. It was his first ever goals in the Swiss Super League and earned him the MVP title for the match. On 10 February 2023, he signed an early contract extension with the Grasshoppers, keeping him at the club until 2025. In his first half year with the Grasshoppers, he played 16 of 19 games, scoring three goals and supplying one assist, and became an important focal point in the midfield. He ended up playing 27 out of 36 games, missing some to minor injuries, and scored four goals and supplied one assist in his debut season in Zurich.

In his second season, he picked up where he left off, scoring Grasshopper's only goal in the opening game 1–3 defeat to Servette FC. Ndenge quickly became the teams most dangerous goal threat, scoring seven in the first half of the season. However, a knee injury and resulting surgery during the winter break, would sideline him for six games, during which the team were drawn into relegation danger. Ndenge's return was unable to turn their favors, as no other player was able to match his scoring record that season. As a result, Grasshoppers were forced to secure their spot in the Super League through the relegation play-off, which Ndenge played for the full 180 minutes. Including the play-off, he played a total 32 games and scored eight goals, the most of any Grasshopper player that season.

On 24 August 2024, he scored the final goal in a 3–1 victory over FC Sion, his 13th goal for Grasshoppers in his 100th appearance in the Swiss Super League. On 17 June 2025, Grasshoppers announced that Ndenge would depart the club that summer at the end of his contract. In 91 appearances for the Swiss record champions, he scored 15 goals and supplied four assists.

=== Lion City Sailors ===
On 16 July 2025, after his departure from Grasshopper, it was announced that Ndenge signed a two year contract with Singapore Premier League club LCS warding off interest from Cagilari, 1. FC Köln, Copenhagen and AEK Athens. Ndenge was brought on as a substitute at the 2025 Singapore Community Shield and assisted Lennart Thy with a goal. The Sailors eventually lost to Tampines Rovers in a 1–4 defeat.

== International career ==
Ndenge represented Germany at under-19 and under-20 level. In October 2020, he was called up to the Cameroon senior squad for the first time but did not make any appearances.

== Personal life ==
Born in Germany, Ndenge is of Cameroonian descent.

== Honours ==
Lion City Sailors

- Singapore Community Shield runner-up: 2025
- Singapore Cup: 2025–26
