= 2020–21 Borussia Mönchengladbach season =

Borussia Mönchengladbach
2020–21 season
- President: Rolf Königs
- Head coach: Marco Rose
- Stadium: Borussia-Park
- Bundesliga: 8th
- DFB-Pokal: Quarter-finals
- UEFA Champions League: Round of 16
- Top goalscorer: League: Lars Stindl (14); All: Lars Stindl (17)
Home colours	Away colours	Third colours

The 2020–21 season was the 121st season in the existence of Borussia Mönchengladbach and the club's 13th consecutive season in the top flight of German football. In addition to the domestic league, Borussia Mönchengladbach participated in this season's editions of the DFB-Pokal and the UEFA Champions League. The season covered the period from 1 July 2020 to 30 June 2021.

== Players ==
=== First-team squad ===
As of 8 February 2021

Note: Flags indicate national team as defined under FIFA eligibility rules; some limited exceptions apply. Players may hold more than one non-FIFA nationality.

No.	Pos.	Nation	Player
1	GK	SUI	Yann Sommer (vice-captain)
3	DF	SUI	Michael Lang
4	DF	FRA	Mamadou Doucouré
6	MF	GER	Christoph Kramer
7	MF	GER	Patrick Herrmann
8	MF	SUI	Denis Zakaria
10	FW	FRA	Marcus Thuram
11	MF	AUT	Hannes Wolf (on loan from RB Leipzig)
13	FW	GER	Lars Stindl (captain)
14	FW	FRA	Alassane Pléa
15	DF	GER	Jordan Beyer
16	MF	GUI	Ibrahima Traoré
17	DF	SWE	Oscar Wendt
18	DF	AUT	Stefan Lainer
19	MF	AUT	Valentino Lazaro (on loan from Inter Milan)
20	FW	PAR	Julio Villalba

No.	Pos.	Nation	Player
21	GK	GER	Tobias Sippel
23	MF	GER	Jonas Hofmann
24	DF	GER	Tony Jantschke
25	DF	ALG	Ramy Bensebaini
26	FW	GER	Torben Müsel
27	MF	POR	Famana Quizera
28	DF	GER	Matthias Ginter
29	DF	USA	Joe Scally
30	DF	SUI	Nico Elvedi
31	GK	GER	Max Grün
32	MF	GER	Florian Neuhaus
33	DF	GER	Kaan Kurt
36	FW	SUI	Breel Embolo
41	GK	GER	Jan Olschowsky
43	MF	GER	Rocco Reitz

=== Players out on loan ===
Note: Flags indicate national team as defined under FIFA eligibility rules; some limited exceptions apply. Players may hold more than one non-FIFA nationality.

No.	Pos.	Nation	Player
—	GK	GER	Moritz Nicolas (on loan to VfL Osnabrück until 30 June 2021)
—	MF	ENG	Keanan Bennetts (on loan to Ipswich Town until 30 June 2021)
—	MF	FRA	Kouadio Koné (on loan to Toulouse until 30 June 2021)

No.	Pos.	Nation	Player
—	MF	SVK	László Bénes (on loan to FC Augsburg until 30 June 2021)
—	DF	DEN	Andreas Poulsen (on loan to Austria Wien until 30 June 2021)

== Transfers ==
=== In ===
No.	Pos	Player	Transferred from	Fee	Date	Source
11	MF	(Austria) Hannes Wolf	(Germany) RB Leipzig	Loan	21 July 2020	
19	MF	(Austria) Valentino Lazaro	(Italy) Inter Milan	Loan	20 August 2020	
29	DF	(United States) Joseph Scally	(United States) New York City FC	€1,800,000	1 January 2021	
	MF	(France) Kouadio Koné	(France) Toulouse	€9,000,000	21 January 2021	

=== Out ===
No.	Pos	Player	Transferred to	Fee	Date	Source
5	MF	(Germany) Tobias Strobl	(Germany) FC Augsburg	Free	1 July 2020	
11	FW	(Brazil) Raffael		Free	1 July 2020	
19	MF	(United States) Fabian Johnson		Free	1 July 2020	
	GK	(Germany) Moritz Nicolas	(Germany) VfL Osnabrück	Loan	15 August 2020	
37	MF	(England) Keanan Bennetts	(England) Ipswich Town	Loan	2 October 2020	
	MF	(France) Kouadio Koné	(France) Toulouse	Loan	21 January 2021	
22	MF	(Slovakia) László Bénes	(Germany) FC Augsburg	Loan	1 February 2021	

== Pre-season and friendlies ==
Win Draw Loss

12 August 2020 Friendly	Borussia Mönchengladbach	4–0	SC Verl	Mönchengladbach, Germany
16:00 CEST (UTC+2)	Embolo 22'; Quizera 69'; Wolf 82'; Villalba 90+3'	Report		Stadium: Fohlenplatz; Attendance: 0 Referee: Sven Waschitzki

15 August 2020 Friendly	Borussia Mönchengladbach	4–0	MSV Duisburg	Mönchengladbach, Germany
14:00 CEST (UTC+2)	Lainer 51'; Neuhaus 63'; Embolo 67'; Herrmann 72'	Report		Stadium: Fohlenplatz; Attendance: 0 Referee: Guido Winkmann

22 August 2020 Friendly	Borussia Mönchengladbach	2–0	SC Paderborn	Harsewinkel, Germany
17:00 CEST (UTC+2)	Wolf 50'; Lainer 68'	Report		Stadium: Sportanlage Klosterpforte; Attendance: 0 Referee: Robin Braun

27 August 2020 Friendly	Borussia Mönchengladbach	0–2	Greuther Fürth	Mönchengladbach, Germany
15:30 CEST (UTC+2)		Report	Green 75', 103'	Stadium: Borussia-Park; Attendance: 300; Referee: Mitja Stegemann
Note: Match was played in two 60-minute halves.

4 September 2020 Friendly	VVV-Venlo	0–4	Borussia Mönchengladbach	Venlo, Netherlands
19:00 CEST (UTC+2)		Report	Stindl 7'; Bensebaini 36' (pen.); Müsel 47'; Herrmann 56'	Stadium: De Koel; Attendance: 1,500; Referee: Erwin Blank

8 October 2020 Friendly	Borussia Mönchengladbach	4–0	Fortuna Düsseldorf	Mönchengladbach, Germany
15:00 CEST (UTC+2)	Pléa 3'; Embolo 15', 59'; Stindl 84'	Report	Kownacki (yellow card)	Stadium: Fohlenplatz; Attendance: 300; Referee: Marc Borsch

== Competitions ==
=== Overview ===
Competition	First match	Last match	Starting round	Final position	Record							
Competition	First match	Last match	Starting round	Final position	Pld	W	D	L	GF	GA	GD	Win %
Bundesliga	19 September 2020	22 May 2021	Matchday 1	8th	34	13	10	11	64	56	+8	38.24
DFB-Pokal	12 September 2020	2 March 2021	First round	Quarter-finals	4	3	0	1	15	2	+13	75.00
UEFA Champions League	21 October 2020	16 March 2021	Group stage	Round of 16	8	2	2	4	16	13	+3	25.00
Total					46	18	12	16	95	71	+24	39.13

Source: Soccerway

=== Bundesliga ===
==== League table ====
Pos	Team	Pld	W	D	L	GF	GA	GD	Pts	Qualification or relegation
6	Bayer Leverkusen	34	14	10	10	53	39	+14	52	Qualification for the Europa League group stage (Note: Since the winners of the 2020–21 DFB-Pokal, Borussia Dortmund, qualified for the Champions League based on league position, the Europa League group stage spot was passed to the sixth-placed team, and the Europa Conference League play-off round spot was passed to the seventh-placed team.)
7	Union Berlin	34	12	14	8	50	43	+7	50	Qualification for the Europa Conference League play-off round
8	Borussia Mönchengladbach	34	13	10	11	64	56	+8	49	
9	VfB Stuttgart	34	12	9	13	56	55	+1	45	
10	SC Freiburg	34	12	9	13	52	52	0	45	

Source: DFB
Rules for classification: 1) Points; 2) Goal difference; 3) Goals scored; 4) Head-to-head results; 5) Head-to-head away goals scored; 6) Away goals scored; 7) Play-off.

==== Results summary ====
Overall								Home						Away					
Pld	W	D	L	GF	GA	GD	Pts	W	D	L	GF	GA	GD	W	D	L	GF	GA	GD
34	13	10	11	64	56	+8	49	8	4	5	32	19	+13	5	6	6	32	37	−5

Source: DFB

==== Results by round ====
Round	1	2	3	4	5	6	7	8	9	10	11	12	13	14	15	16	17	18	19	20	21	22	23	24	25	26	27	28	29	30	31	32	33	34
Ground	A	H	A	H	A	H	A	H	H	A	H	A	H	A	H	A	H	H	A	H	A	H	A	H	A	A	H	A	H	A	H	A	H	A
Result	L	D	W	D	W	W	L	D	W	D	D	D	L	W	W	D	W	W	D	L	D	L	L	L	L	W	W	D	W	L	W	L	L	W
Position	17	15	11	11	6	5	7	7	7	7	8	8	8	7	7	8	7	5	7	7	7	8	9	10	10	10	9	8	7	7	7	7	8	8

Source: DFB
A = Away; H = Home; W = Win; D = Draw; L = Loss

==== Matches ====
The league fixtures were announced on 7 August 2020.

19 September 2020 1	Borussia Dortmund	3–0	Borussia Mönchengladbach	Dortmund
18:30 CEST (UTC+2)	Akanji (yellow card) 13'; Reyna 35'; Haaland 54' (pen.), 77'	Report	Stindl (yellow card) 39'	Stadium: Signal Iduna Park; Attendance: 9,300; Referee: Felix Brych

26 September 2020 2	Borussia Mönchengladbach	1–1	Union Berlin	Mönchengladbach
15:30 CEST (UTC+2)	Bensebaini (yellow card) 11'; Thuram 56'	Report	Trimmel (yellow card) 64'; Schlotterbeck 80'; Andrich (yellow card) 90+2'	Stadium: Borussia-Park; Attendance: 10,383; Referee: Tobias Stieler

3 October 2020 3	1. FC Köln	1–3	Borussia Mönchengladbach	Cologne
15:30 CEST (UTC+2)	Ehizibue (yellow card) 31'; Rexhbecaj (yellow card) 35', (goal) 84'; Sørensen (yellow card) 90'	Report	Pléa 14'; Lainer 16', (yellow card) 90+2'; Bensebaini (yellow card) 31'; Stindl 56' (pen.); Herrmann (yellow card) 82'	Stadium: RheinEnergieStadion; Attendance: 300; Referee: Marco Fritz

17 October 2020 4	Borussia Mönchengladbach	1–1	VfL Wolfsburg	Mönchengladbach
20:30 CEST (UTC+2)	Neuhaus (yellow card) 77'; Hofmann 78' (pen.); Herrmann (yellow card) 90'	Report	Schlager (yellow card) 22'; Guilavogui (yellow card) 77'; Weghorst 85'	Stadium: Borussia-Park; Attendance: 300; Referee: Daniel Schlager

24 October 2020 5	Mainz 05	2–3	Borussia Mönchengladbach	Mainz
15:30 CEST (UTC+2)	Mateta 23', 36'; Kunde (yellow card) 49'; Kilian (yellow card) 61'; Niakhaté (yellow card) 75'; Latza (yellow card) 77'; Zentner (yellow card) 83'	Report	Stindl 15'; Embolo (yellow card) 53'; Neuhaus (yellow card) 62'; Hofmann 75' (pen.); Ginter 83'; Thuram (yellow card) 84'	Stadium: Opel Arena; Attendance: 100; Referee: Frank Willenborg

31 October 2020 6	Borussia Mönchengladbach	1–0	RB Leipzig	Mönchengladbach
18:30 CET (UTC+1)	Wendt (yellow card) 52'; Neuhaus (yellow card) 56'; Wolf 60'	Report	Kampl (yellow card) 61'; Hwang (yellow card) 69'; Sabitzer (yellow card) 70'; Nkunku (yellow card) 90+4'	Stadium: Borussia-Park; Attendance: 0 Referee: Daniel Siebert

8 November 2020 7	Bayer Leverkusen	4–3	Borussia Mönchengladbach	Leverkusen
18:00 CET (UTC+1)	Hrádecký (yellow card) 18'; Alario 27', 41'; L. Bender (yellow card) 51'; Bailey 68'; Baumgartlinger 82'; Wirtz (yellow card) 84'; Diaby (yellow card) 86'	Report	Stindl 18' (pen.), 30'; Bensebaini (yellow card) 45+4'; Embolo (yellow card) 46'; Lazaro 90+4'	Stadium: BayArena; Attendance: 0 Referee: Harm Osmers

21 November 2020 8	Borussia Mönchengladbach	1–1	FC Augsburg	Mönchengladbach
15:30 CET (UTC+1)	Neuhaus 5'; Thuram (yellow card) 90+2'	Report	Khedira (yellow card) 38'; Framberger (yellow card) 62' (yellow-red card) 66'; Gouweleeuw (yellow card) 65'; Caligiuri 88'	Stadium: Borussia-Park; Attendance: 0 Referee: Markus Schmidt

28 November 2020 9	Borussia Mönchengladbach	4–1	Schalke 04	Mönchengladbach
18:30 CET (UTC+1)	Neuhaus 15'; Lazaro (yellow card) 26'; Wendt 36'; Thuram (yellow card) 46', (goal) 52'; Wolf 80'	Report	Raman 20'; Ludewig (yellow card) 34'; Thiaw (yellow card) 50'; Uth (yellow card) 84'	Stadium: Borussia-Park; Attendance: 0 Referee: Manuel Gräfe

5 December 2020 10	SC Freiburg	2–2	Borussia Mönchengladbach	Freiburg
15:30 CET (UTC+1)	Schlotterbeck (yellow card) 25'; Lienhart 32'; Grifo 49' (pen.)	Report	Embolo 23'; Neuhaus (yellow card) 45+1'; Pléa 50', (yellow card) 76'	Stadium: Schwarzwald-Stadion; Attendance: 0 Referee: Tobias Stieler

12 December 2020 11	Borussia Mönchengladbach	1–1	Hertha BSC	Mönchengladbach
15:30 CET (UTC+1)	Wendt (yellow card) 12'; Lazaro (yellow card) 43'; Embolo 70'; Neuhaus (yellow card) 82'	Report	Pekarík (yellow card) 26'; Guendouzi 47', (yellow card) 68'	Stadium: Borussia-Park; Attendance: 0 Referee: Robert Hartmann

15 December 2020 12	Eintracht Frankfurt	3–3	Borussia Mönchengladbach	Frankfurt
18:30 CET (UTC+1)	Hasebe (yellow card) 13'; Silva 22' (pen.), 24'; Abraham (yellow card) 30' (yellow-red card) 81'; Barkok 32', (yellow card) 89'; Kohr (yellow card) 75'; Rode (yellow card) 81'	Report	Stindl 14', 90' (pen.), 90+5', (yellow card) 90+6'; Lainer (yellow card) 21'; Zakaria (yellow card) 78'; Embolo (yellow card) 81'	Stadium: Deutsche Bank Park; Attendance: 0 Referee: Benjamin Cortus

19 December 2020 13	Borussia Mönchengladbach	1–2	1899 Hoffenheim	Mönchengladbach
15:30 CET (UTC+1)	Stindl 34' (pen.); Thuram (red card) 79'; Ginter (yellow card) 90+3'	Report	Geiger (yellow card) 38'; Kramarić 75'; Posch (yellow card) 79'; Sessegnon 86'; Rudy (yellow card) 87'	Stadium: Borussia-Park; Attendance: 0 Referee: Frank Willenborg

2 January 2021 14	Arminia Bielefeld	0–1	Borussia Mönchengladbach	Bielefeld
15:30 CET (UTC+1)	De Medina (yellow card) 20'; Ortega (yellow card) 62'	Report	Neuhaus (yellow card) 40'; Embolo 58'	Stadium: Bielefelder Alm; Attendance: 0 Referee: Sascha Stegemann

8 January 2021 15	Borussia Mönchengladbach	3–2	Bayern Munich	Mönchengladbach
20:30 CET (UTC+1)	Hofmann 36', 45'; Neuhaus 49'; Ginter (yellow card) 62'	Report	Lewandowski 20' (pen.); Goretzka 26'; Süle (yellow card) 63'	Stadium: Borussia-Park; Attendance: 0 Referee: Harm Osmers

16 January 2021 16	VfB Stuttgart	2–2	Borussia Mönchengladbach	Stuttgart
18:30 CET (UTC+1)	González 58', (yellow card) 71'; Silas (yellow card) 81', (goal) 90+6' (pen.)	Report	Stindl 35' (pen.), (yellow card) 45'; Zakaria (yellow card) 37', (goal) 61'; Hofmann (yellow card) 74'	Stadium: Mercedes-Benz Arena; Attendance: 0 Referee: Felix Brych

19 January 2021 17	Borussia Mönchengladbach	1–0	Werder Bremen	Mönchengladbach
18:30 CET (UTC+1)	Sommer (yellow card) 37'; Elvedi 66'; Wendt (yellow card) 68'	Report	Pavlenka (yellow card) 22'; Sargent (yellow card) 48'	Stadium: Borussia-Park; Attendance: 0 Referee: Martin Petersen

22 January 2021 18	Borussia Mönchengladbach	4–2	Borussia Dortmund	Mönchengladbach
20:30 CET (UTC+1)	Elvedi 11', 32'; Bensebaini 49'; Thuram 78'; Kramer (yellow card) 90'	Report	Haaland 22', 28'	Stadium: Borussia-Park; Attendance: 0 Referee: Manuel Gräfe

30 January 2021 19	Union Berlin	1–1	Borussia Mönchengladbach	Berlin
15:30 CET (UTC+1)	Knoche 31'; Schlotterbeck (yellow card) 71'	Report	Kramer (yellow card) 8'; Zakaria (yellow card) 45'; Pléa 59'; Neuhaus (yellow card) 63'	Stadium: Stadion An der Alten Försterei; Attendance: 0 Referee: Bastian Dankert

6 February 2021 20	Borussia Mönchengladbach	1–2	1. FC Köln	Mönchengladbach
18:30 CET (UTC+1)	Stindl (yellow card) 2'; Neuhaus 16', (yellow card) 90+5'; Herrmann (yellow card) 27'; Jantschke (yellow card) 75'	Report	Rexhbeçaj 3', 55', (yellow card) 86'; Ehizibue (yellow card) 80'	Stadium: Borussia-Park; Attendance: 0 Referee: Christian Dingert

14 February 2021 21	VfL Wolfsburg	0–0	Borussia Mönchengladbach	Wolfsburg
18:00 CET (UTC+1)	Brooks (yellow card) 11'	Report	Bensebaini (yellow card) 7'; Pléa (yellow card) 79'; Embolo (yellow card) 85'	Stadium: Volkswagen Arena; Attendance: 0 Referee: Tobias Stieler

20 February 2021 22	Borussia Mönchengladbach	1–2	Mainz 05	Mönchengladbach
15:30 CET (UTC+1)	Kramer (yellow card) 14'; Stindl 26'	Report	Onisiwo 10'; Kohr (yellow card) 61'; Stöger 86'	Stadium: Borussia-Park; Attendance: 0 Referee: Markus Schmidt

27 February 2021 23	RB Leipzig	3–2	Borussia Mönchengladbach	Leipzig
18:30 CET (UTC+1)	Sabitzer (yellow card) 41'; Upamecano (yellow card) 43'; Nkunku 57'; Poulsen 66'; Sørloth 90+3'	Report	Hofmann 6' (pen.); Thuram 19'; Elvedi (yellow card) 49'; Stindl (yellow card) 90+3'	Stadium: Red Bull Arena; Attendance: 0 Referee: Manuel Gräfe

6 March 2021 24	Borussia Mönchengladbach	0–1	Bayer Leverkusen	Mönchengladbach
15:30 CET (UTC+1)		Report	Amiri (yellow card) 38'; Schick 76', (yellow card) 90+3'	Stadium: Borussia-Park; Attendance: 0 Referee: Daniel Siebert

12 March 2021 25	FC Augsburg	3–1	Borussia Mönchengladbach	Augsburg
20:30 CET (UTC+1)	Vargas 52'; Richter 76'; Hahn 89'	Report	Stindl (penalty missed) 38'; Neuhaus 68'	Stadium: WWK Arena; Attendance: 0 Referee: Sven Jablonski

20 March 2021 26	Schalke 04	0–3	Borussia Mönchengladbach	Gelsenkirchen
18:30 CET (UTC+1)	Mascarell (yellow card) 22'	Report	Bensebaini (yellow card) 7'; Stindl 15', (yellow card) 54'; Lainer 63'; Rønnow 72' (o.g.)	Stadium: Veltins-Arena; Attendance: 0 Referee: Tobias Stieler

3 April 2021 27	Borussia Mönchengladbach	2–1	SC Freiburg	Mönchengladbach
20:30 CEST (UTC+2)	Thuram 53', 60'; Kramer (yellow card) 80'	Report	Sallai 10'; Demirović (yellow card) 31'; Höler (yellow card) 64'; Günter (yellow card) 81'	Stadium: Borussia-Park; Attendance: 0 Referee: Christian Dingert

10 April 2021 28	Hertha BSC	2–2	Borussia Mönchengladbach	Berlin
15:30 CEST (UTC+2)	Zeefuik (yellow card) 20'; Ascacíbar 23'; Mittelstädt (yellow card) 40'; Córdoba 49'	Report	Sommer (red card) 13'; Pléa 27'; Stindl 38' (pen.); Kramer (yellow card) 82'	Stadium: Olympiastadion; Attendance: 0 Referee: Patrick Ittrich

17 April 2021 29	Borussia Mönchengladbach	4–0	Eintracht Frankfurt	Mönchengladbach
15:30 CEST (UTC+2)	Ginter 10'; Bensebaini (yellow card) 46', (goal) 67'; Hofmann 60'; Reitz (yellow card) 90+2'; Wolf 90+5'	Report	Ndicka (yellow card) 43'; Ilsanker (yellow card) 53'; Silva (yellow card) 75'; Chandler (yellow card) 78'	Stadium: Borussia-Park; Attendance: 0 Referee: Deniz Aytekin

21 April 2021 30	1899 Hoffenheim	3–2	Borussia Mönchengladbach	Sinsheim
20:30 CEST (UTC+2)	Grillitsch (yellow card) 10'; Kramarić 49', 65'; Posch (yellow card) 53'; Bebou 60'; Kadeřábek (yellow card) 90'	Report	Pléa 25'; Lazaro 45+1'	Stadium: Rhein-Neckar-Arena; Attendance: 0 Referee: Daniel Siebert

25 April 2021 31	Borussia Mönchengladbach	5–0	Arminia Bielefeld	Mönchengladbach
18:00 CEST (UTC+2)	Embolo 6', 69'; Thuram 15'; Bensebaini 18' (pen.); Lazaro (yellow card) 36'; Pléa 84'	Report	De Medina (yellow card) 52'	Stadium: Borussia-Park; Attendance: 0 Referee: Robert Hartmann

8 May 2021 32	Bayern Munich	6–0	Borussia Mönchengladbach	Munich
18:30 CEST (UTC+2)	Lewandowski 2', 34', 66' (pen.); Müller 23'; Coman 44'; Nianzou (red card) 75'; Sané 85'	Report	Neuhaus (yellow card) 65'; Wolf (yellow card) 90'	Stadium: Allianz Arena; Attendance: 0 Referee: Tobias Stieler

15 May 2021 33	Borussia Mönchengladbach	1–2	VfB Stuttgart	Mönchengladbach
15:30 CEST (UTC+2)	Stindl 45'; Bensebaini (yellow card) 86'; Zakaria (yellow card) 89'	Report	Förster (yellow card) 64'; Endo 72', (yellow card) 90+3'; Kalajdžić 77'; Massimo (yellow card) 84'; Castro (yellow card) 89'	Stadium: Borussia-Park; Attendance: 0 Referee: Sascha Stegemann

22 May 2021 34	Werder Bremen	2–4	Borussia Mönchengladbach	Bremen
15:30 CEST (UTC+2)	Rashica 80'; Füllkrug 83'; Moisander (yellow card) 87'	Report	Stindl 3'; Wolf (yellow card) 35'; Thuram 52'; Bensebaini 58'; Zakaria (yellow card) 62'; Neuhaus 68'	Stadium: Weser-Stadion; Attendance: 100; Referee: Felix Brych

=== DFB-Pokal ===
12 September 2020 First round	FC Oberneuland	0–8	Borussia Mönchengladbach	Mönchengladbach
15:30 CEST (UTC+2)	Nukic (yellow card) 72'; Ifeadigo (yellow card) 85'	Report	Herrmann 12', 13'; Hofmann 19'; Bensebaini 24'; Elvedi 35'; Neuhaus 52', 84'; Traoré 76'	Stadium: Borussia-Park; Attendance: 300; Referee: Sascha Stegemann

22 December 2020 Second round	SV Elversberg	0–5	Borussia Mönchengladbach	Spiesen-Elversberg
20:45 CET (UTC+1)	Tekerci (yellow card) 26' (yellow-red card) 31'	Report	Wolf 5'; Bénes 21', (yellow card) 63'; Stindl 35'; Herrmann 69'; Villalba 83' (pen.)	Stadium: Ursapharm-Arena an der Kaiserlinde; Attendance: 0 Referee: Markus Schmidt

3 February 2021 Round of 16	VfB Stuttgart	1–2	Borussia Mönchengladbach	Stuttgart
20:45 CET (UTC+1)	Silas 2'; Mavropanos (yellow card) 18'; González (yellow card) 81'; Anton (yellow card) 90+3'	Report	Bensebaini (yellow card) 22'; Thuram 45+1'; Pléa 50'; Stindl (yellow card) 77'	Stadium: Mercedes-Benz Arena; Attendance: 0 Referee: Daniel Siebert

2 March 2021 Quarter-finals	Borussia Mönchengladbach	0–1	Borussia Dortmund	Mönchengladbach
20:45 CET (UTC+1)	Stindl (yellow card) 32'; Bensebaini (yellow card) 90+2'	Report	Dahoud (yellow card) 29' (yellow-red card) 90+2'; Reus (yellow card) 50'; Sancho 66'; Hitz (yellow card) 90+5'	Stadium: Borussia-Park; Attendance: 0 Referee: Sascha Stegemann

=== UEFA Champions League ===
==== Group stage ====
The group stage draw was held on 1 October 2020.

Pos	Team	Pld	W	D	L	GF	GA	GD	Pts	Qualification	RMA	BMG	SHK	INT
1	(Spain) Real Madrid	6	3	1	2	11	9	+2	10	Advance to knockout phase	—	2–0	2–3	3–2
2	(Germany) Borussia Mönchengladbach	6	2	2	2	16	9	+7	8 (Note: Head-to-head points: Borussia Mönchengladbach 6, Shakhtar Donetsk 0.)	Advance to knockout phase	2–2	—	4–0	2–3
3	(Ukraine) Shakhtar Donetsk	6	2	2	2	5	12	−7	8	Transfer to Europa League	2–0	0–6	—	0–0
4	(Italy) Inter Milan	6	1	3	2	7	9	−2	6		0–2	2–2	0–0	—

Source: UEFA
Rules for classification: Group stage tiebreakers
Notes:

21 October 2020 1	Internazionale (Italy)	2–2	(Germany) Borussia Mönchengladbach	Milan, Italy
21:00 CEST (UTC+2)	D'Ambrosio (yellow card) 17'; Lukaku 49', 90'; De Vrij (yellow card) 65'; Handanović (yellow card) 82'	Report	Bensebaini 62' (pen.); Kramer (yellow card) 68'; Hofmann 85'	Stadium: San Siro; Attendance: 1,000; Referee: Björn Kuipers (Netherlands)

27 October 2020 2	Borussia Mönchengladbach (Germany)	2–2	(Spain) Real Madrid	Mönchengladbach, Germany
21:00 CET (UTC+1)	Thuram 33', 58'; Stindl (yellow card) 55'; Bensebaini (yellow card) 78'; Neuhaus (yellow card) 85'	Report	Benzema 87'; Casemiro (yellow card) 89', (goal) 90+3'	Stadium: Borussia-Park; Attendance: 0 (Note: Due to the COVID-19 pandemic in Europe, the match was played behind closed doors.); Referee: Orel Grinfeld (Israel)

3 November 2020 3	Shakhtar Donetsk (Ukraine)	0–6	(Germany) Borussia Mönchengladbach	Kyiv, Ukraine
18:55 CET (UTC+1)	Khocholava (yellow card) 46'; Solomon (yellow card) 63'	Report	Pléa 8', 26', 78'; Bondar 17' (o.g.); Bensebaini 44'; Stindl 65'; Lang (yellow card) 89'	Stadium: NSC Olimpiyskiy Stadium; Attendance: 0 Referee: Serdar Gözübüyük (Netherlands)

25 November 2020 4	Borussia Mönchengladbach (Germany)	4–0	(Ukraine) Shakhtar Donetsk	Mönchengladbach, Germany
18:55 CET (UTC+1)	Stindl 17' (pen.); Elvedi 34'; Embolo 45+1'; Lazaro (yellow card) 48'; Wendt 77'; Lainer (yellow card) 90+1'	Report	Stepanenko (yellow card) 45'	Stadium: Borussia-Park; Attendance: 0 Referee: Cüneyt Çakır (Turkey)

1 December 2020 5	Borussia Mönchengladbach (Germany)	2–3	(Italy) Internazionale	Mönchengladbach, Germany
21:00 CET (UTC+1)	Stindl (yellow card) 10'; Pléa 45+1', 76', (yellow card) 90+5'; Lainer (yellow card) 75'	Report	Darmian 17'; Martínez (yellow card) 20'; De Vrij (yellow card) 58'; Lukaku 64', 73', (yellow card) 89'; Barella (yellow card) 71'; Young (yellow card) 80'; Gagliardini (yellow card) 90+1'; Bastoni (yellow card) 90+5'	Stadium: Borussia-Park; Attendance: 0 Referee: Danny Makkelie (Netherlands)

9 December 2020 6	Real Madrid (Spain)	2–0	(Germany) Borussia Mönchengladbach	Madrid, Spain
21:00 CET (UTC+1)	Benzema 9', 32'	Report	Zakaria (yellow card) 88'	Stadium: Alfredo Di Stéfano (Note: Real Madrid played their home matches at Alfredo di Stéfano, Madrid, instead of their regular home stadium Santiago Bernabéu, Madrid.); Attendance: 0 Referee: Björn Kuipers (Netherlands)

==== Knockout phase ====
===== Round of 16 =====
The draw for the round of 16 was held on 14 December 2020.

24 February 2021 First leg	Borussia Mönchengladbach (Germany)	0–2	(England) Manchester City	Budapest, Hungary
21:00 CET (UTC+1)		Report	Silva 29'; Gabriel Jesus 65'	Stadium: Puskás Aréna; Attendance: 0 Referee: Artur Soares Dias (Portugal)
Note: The match, originally to be played at Borussia-Park in Mönchengladbach, was moved to Puskás Aréna in Budapest, due to restrictions imposed by Germany on travelers from the United Kingdom out of concern of the COVID-19 variant B.1.1.7.

16 March 2021 Second leg	Manchester City (England)	2–0 (4–0 agg.)	(Germany) Borussia Mönchengladbach	Budapest, Hungary
20:00 GMT (UTC±0)	De Bruyne 12'; Gündoğan 18'; Cancelo (yellow card) 55'; Fernandinho (yellow card) 82'	Report	Lainer (yellow card) 61'	Stadium: Puskás Aréna; Attendance: 0 Referee: Sergei Karasev (Russia)
Note: The match, originally to be played at City of Manchester Stadium in Manchester, was moved to Puskás Aréna in Budapest, due to restrictions imposed by the United Kingdom on travelers from Germany out of concern of the COVID-19 variant B.1.1.7.

== Statistics ==
=== Appearances and goals ===
No.	Pos	Nat	Player	Total		Bundesliga		DFB-Pokal		Champions League	
No.	Pos	Nat	Player	Apps	Goals	Apps	Goals	Apps	Goals	Apps	Goals
Goalkeepers
1	GK	(Switzerland) SUI	Yann Sommer	39	0	31	0	0	0	8	0
21	GK	(Germany) GER	Tobias Sippel	8	0	3+1	0	4	0	0	0
31	GK	(Germany) GER	Max Grün	0	0	0	0	0	0	0	0
41	GK	(Germany) GER	Jan Olschowsky	0	0	0	0	0	0	0	0
Defenders
3	DF	(Switzerland) SUI	Michael Lang	3	0	0	0	0+2	0	0+1	0
4	DF	(France) FRA	Mamadou Doucouré	0	0	0	0	0	0	0	0
15	DF	(Germany) GER	Jordan Beyer	4	0	2+2	0	0	0	0	0
17	DF	(Sweden) SWE	Oscar Wendt	29	2	15+7	1	1+2	0	3+1	1
18	DF	(Austria) AUT	Stefan Lainer	45	2	31+2	2	4	0	8	0
24	DF	(Germany) GER	Tony Jantschke	12	0	3+5	0	0+1	0	1+2	0
25	DF	(Algeria) ALG	Ramy Bensebaini	33	7	20+5	4	3	1	5	2
28	DF	(Germany) GER	Matthias Ginter	46	2	34	2	4	0	8	0
29	DF	(United States) USA	Joseph Scally	0	0	0	0	0	0	0	0
30	DF	(Switzerland) SUI	Nico Elvedi	40	5	29	3	4	1	7	1
33	DF	(Germany) GER	Kaan Kurt	0	0	0	0	0	0	0	0
40	DF	(Denmark) DEN	Andreas Poulsen	0	0	0	0	0	0	0	0
Midfielders
6	MF	(Germany) GER	Christoph Kramer	39	0	23+5	0	4	0	7	0
7	MF	(Germany) GER	Patrick Herrmann	33	3	9+18	0	1+1	3	0+4	0
8	MF	(Switzerland) SUI	Denis Zakaria	32	1	15+10	1	0+2	0	2+3	0
11	MF	(Austria) AUT	Hannes Wolf	43	4	14+18	3	2+2	1	0+7	0
16	MF	(Guinea) GUI	Ibrahima Traoré	12	1	1+6	0	0+2	1	0+3	0
19	MF	(Austria) AUT	Valentino Lazaro	28	2	13+9	2	0+1	0	2+3	0
23	MF	(Germany) GER	Jonas Hofmann	33	8	21+3	6	4	1	5	1
27	MF	(Portugal) POR	Famana Quizera	0	0	0	0	0	0	0	0
32	MF	(Germany) GER	Florian Neuhaus	45	8	30+3	6	3+1	2	8	0
43	MF	(Germany) GER	Rocco Reitz	2	0	1+1	0	0	0	0	0
Forwards
10	FW	(France) FRA	Marcus Thuram	40	11	20+9	8	2+1	1	7+1	2
13	FW	(Germany) GER	Lars Stindl	42	17	23+7	14	4	1	7+1	2
14	FW	(France) FRA	Alassane Pléa	39	12	19+10	6	2	1	6+2	5
20	FW	(Paraguay) PAR	Julio Villalba	1	1	0	0	0+1	1	0	0
26	FW	(Germany) GER	Torben Müsel	0	0	0	0	0	0	0	0
36	FW	(Switzerland) SUI	Breel Embolo	41	6	16+15	5	1+2	0	4+3	1
Players transferred out during the season
22	MF	(Slovakia) SVK	László Bénes	10	1	1+6	0	1	1	0+2	0
37	MF	(England) ENG	Keanan Bennetts	0	0	0	0	0	0	0	0

Last updated: 22 May 2021
Source: Competitions

=== Goalscorers ===
Rank	Pos	No.	Nat	Name	Bundesliga	DFB-Pokal	UEFA CL	Total
1	FW	13	(Germany)	Lars Stindl	14	1	2	17
2	FW	14	(France)	Alassane Pléa	6	1	5	12
3	FW	10	(France)	Marcus Thuram	8	1	2	11
4	MF	23	(Germany)	Jonas Hofmann	6	1	1	8
4	MF	32	(Germany)	Florian Neuhaus	6	2	0	8
6	DF	25	(Algeria)	Ramy Bensebaini	4	1	2	7
7	FW	36	(Switzerland)	Breel Embolo	5	0	1	6
8	DF	30	(Switzerland)	Nico Elvedi	3	1	1	5
9	MF	11	(Austria)	Hannes Wolf	3	1	0	4
10	MF	7	(Germany)	Patrick Herrmann	0	3	0	3
11	DF	17	(Sweden)	Oscar Wendt	1	0	1	2
11	DF	18	(Austria)	Stefan Lainer	2	0	0	2
11	MF	19	(Austria)	Valentino Lazaro	2	0	0	2
11	DF	28	(Germany)	Matthias Ginter	2	0	0	2
15	MF	8	(Switzerland)	Denis Zakaria	1	0	0	1
15	MF	16	(Guinea)	Ibrahima Traoré	0	1	0	1
15	FW	20	(Paraguay)	Julio Villalba	0	1	0	1
15	MF	22	(Slovakia)	László Bénes	0	1	0	1
Own goals					1	0	1	1
Totals					64	15	16	95

Last updated: 22 May 2021
