= 2022–23 Borussia Mönchengladbach season =

Borussia Mönchengladbach
2022–23 season
- President: Rolf Königs
- Head coach: Daniel Farke
- Stadium: Borussia-Park
- Bundesliga: 10th
- DFB-Pokal: Second round
- Top goalscorer: League: Marcus Thuram (13); All: Marcus Thuram (16)
- Highest home attendance: 49,659 v 1899 Hoffenheim
- Average home league attendance: 49,659
- Biggest win: 9–1 vs SV Oberachern
- Biggest defeat: 1–5 vs Werder Bremen; 0–4 vs Mainz 05
Home colours	Away colours	Third colours

The 2022–23 season was the 123rd in the history of Borussia Mönchengladbach and the club's 15th consecutive season in the top flight. They participated in the Bundesliga and DFB-Pokal.

== Players ==
As of 30 January 2022

Note: Flags indicate national team as defined under FIFA eligibility rules; some limited exceptions apply. Players may hold more than one non-FIFA nationality.

No.	Pos.	Nation	Player
1	GK	SUI	Jonas Omlin
3	DF	JPN	Ko Itakura
4	DF	FRA	Mamadou Doucouré
5	DF	GER	Marvin Friedrich
6	MF	GER	Christoph Kramer
7	MF	GER	Patrick Herrmann
8	MF	GER	Julian Weigl (on loan from Benfica)
10	FW	FRA	Marcus Thuram
11	MF	AUT	Hannes Wolf
13	FW	GER	Lars Stindl (captain)
14	FW	FRA	Alassane Pléa
17	MF	FRA	Manu Koné
18	DF	AUT	Stefan Lainer
19	FW	FRA	Nathan Ngoumou

No.	Pos.	Nation	Player
20	DF	GER	Luca Netz
21	GK	GER	Tobias Sippel
22	MF	DEN	Oscar Fraulo
23	MF	GER	Jonas Hofmann
24	DF	GER	Tony Jantschke
25	DF	ALG	Ramy Bensebaini
29	DF	USA	Joe Scally
30	DF	SUI	Nico Elvedi
32	MF	GER	Florian Neuhaus
34	MF	IRL	Conor Noß
35	MF	AUS	Jacob Italiano
38	MF	LUX	Yvandro Borges Sanches
41	GK	GER	Jan Olschowsky

=== On loan ===
Note: Flags indicate national team as defined under FIFA eligibility rules; some limited exceptions apply. Players may hold more than one non-FIFA nationality.

No.	Pos.	Nation	Player
—	DF	GER	Jordan Beyer (at Burnley until 30 June 2023)
—	GK	GER	Jonas Kersken (at SV Meppen until 30 June 2023)
—	GK	GER	Moritz Nicolas (at Roda JC until 30 June 2023)
—	MF	GER	Rocco Reitz (at Sint-Truiden until 30 June 2023)

== Transfers ==
=== In ===
No.	Pos.	Player	Transferred from	Fee	Date	Source
22	MF	(Denmark) Oscar Fraulo	(Denmark) Midtjylland	€2,000,000	1 July 2022	
3	DF	(Japan) Ko Itakura	(England) Manchester City	€5,000,000	2 July 2022	
19	FW	(France) Nathan Ngoumou	(France) Toulouse	€8,000,000	30 August 2022	
8	MF	(Germany) Julian Weigl	(Portugal) Benfica	Loan	1 September 2022	
1	GK	(Switzerland) Jonas Omlin	(France) Montpellier	€9,000,000	19 January 2023	

=== Out ===
No.	Pos.	Player	Transferred to	Fee	Date	Source
22	MF	(Slovakia) László Bénes	(Germany) Hamburger SV	€1,500,000	1 July 2022	
28	DF	(Germany) Matthias Ginter	(Germany) SC Freiburg	Free	1 July 2022	
37	FW	(England) Keanan Bennetts	(Germany) Darmstadt 98	Free	1 July 2022	
40	DF	(Denmark) Andreas Poulsen	(Denmark) AaB	Free	1 July 2022	
46	GK	(Germany) Jonas Kersken	(Germany) SV Meppen	Loan	1 July 2022	
36	FW	(Switzerland) Breel Embolo	(France) Monaco	€12,500,000	15 July 2022	
28	MF	(Portugal) Famana Quizera	(Portugal) Académico de Viseu	Undisclosed	21 July 2022	
33	GK	(Germany) Moritz Nicolas	(Netherlands) Roda JC	Loan	17 August 2022	
15	DF	(Germany) Jordan Beyer	(England) Burnley	Loan	1 September 2022	
27	MF	(Germany) Rocco Reitz	(Belgium) Sint-Truiden	Loan	17 January 2023	
1	GK	(Switzerland) Yann Sommer	(Germany) Bayern Munich	€8,000,000	19 January 2023	
26	MF	(Germany) Torben Müsel	(Germany) RW Essen	Free	30 January 2023	

== Pre-season and friendlies ==
Win Draw Loss

1 July 2022 Friendly	Borussia Mönchengladbach	4–2	Rot-Weiss Essen	Essen, Germany
19:00 CEST (UTC+2)	Thuram 11', 41'; Pléa 23' (pen.); Sponsel 60' (o.g.); Reitz (yellow card) 77'	Report	Harenbrock 25'; Engelmann 49'	Stadium: Stadion an der Hafenstraße; Attendance: 9,390; Referee: Martin Ulankiewicz

10 July 2022 Friendly	1860 Munich	0–6	Borussia Mönchengladbach	Rottach-Egern, Germany
14:00 CEST (UTC+2)		Report	Hofmann 27'; Borges Sanches 34'; Stindl 41'; Herrmann 47', 70'; Wolf 66'	Stadium: Stadion am Birkenmoos; Attendance: 2,500; Referee: Wolfgang Haslberger

13 July 2022 Friendly	Borussia Mönchengladbach	5–2	Viktoria Köln	Mönchengladbach, Germany
18:30 CEST (UTC+2)	Neuhaus 40'; Thuram (yellow card) 54'; Hofmann 58', 86' (pen.); Stindl 61'; Scally 72'	Report	Greger (yellow card) 20'; Sontheimer 65'; Hompesch 83'	Stadium: Fohlenplatz; Attendance: 1,523

16 July 2022 Friendly	Standard Liège	1–1	Borussia Mönchengladbach	Liège, Belgium
14:00 CEST (UTC+2)	Amallah (yellow card) 45'; Emond 49'	Report	Kramer 24'; Wolf (yellow card) 41'	Stadium: Stade Maurice Dufrasne; Attendance: 4,500

17 July 2022 Cup der Traditionen	MSV Duisburg	0–1	Borussia Mönchengladbach	Duisburg, Germany
16:00 CEST (UTC+2)		Report	Mai 13' (o.g.)	Stadium: MSV-Arena; Referee: Lars Aarts
Note: Match was one period of 45 minutes.

17 July 2022 Cup der Traditionen	Athletic Bilbao	0–0	Borussia Mönchengladbach	Duisburg, Germany
17:00 CEST (UTC+2)		Report		Stadium: MSV-Arena; Referee: Lars Aarts (Germany)
Note: Match was one period of 45 minutes.

20 July 2022 Friendly	Borussia Mönchengladbach	1–1	RKC Waalwijk	Velbert, Germany
18:30 CEST (UTC+2)	Pléa 30'; Stindl (penalty missed) 53'	Report	Daneels 19'	Stadium: IMS Arena; Attendance: 1,100

23 July 2022 Friendly	Borussia Mönchengladbach	1–1	Real Sociedad	Mönchengladbach, Germany
15:30 CEST (UTC+2)	Bensebaini 43' (pen.)	Report	Le Normand (yellow card) 43'; Karrikaburu 60'	Stadium: Borussia-Park; Attendance: 10,774; Referee: Robin Braun (Germany)

7 January 2023 Friendly	Borussia Mönchengladbach	2–0	VfB Oldenburg	Mönchengladbach, Germany
14:00 CET (UTC+1)	Bensebaini 18'; Herrmann 74'			Stadium: Fohlenplatz

11 January 2023 Friendly	Borussia Mönchengladbach	4–0	Arminia Bielefeld	Mönchengladbach, Germany
14:00 CET (UTC+1)	N'Goumou 28'; Thuram 77'; Wolf 80'; Koné 88'			Stadium: Fohlenplatz

14 January 2023 Friendly	Borussia Mönchengladbach	0–1	St. Pauli	Mönchengladbach, Germany
14:00 CET (UTC+1)			Otto 24'; Hartel (yellow card)	Stadium: Borussia-Park; Attendance: 5,572; Referee: Robin Braun

29 May 2023 Friendly	FC Oberneuland	0–7	Borussia Mönchengladbach	Bremen
15:00 CEST (UTC+2)		Report	Telalovic 12', 62'; Ngoumou 24' (pen.), 49'; Borges Sanches 38' (pen.); Wolf 45+1'; Hofmann 78'	Stadium: Marko Mock Arena; Attendance: 1,287; Referee: Christoph Kluge

31 May 2023 Friendly	Hallescher FC	0–3	Borussia Mönchengladbach	Halle
18:00 CEST (UTC+2)		Report	Herrmann 7', 13'; Pléa 52'	Stadium: Leuna Chemie Stadion; Attendance: 8,804; Referee: Alexander Sather

== Competitions ==
=== Overall record ===
Competition	First match	Last match	Starting round	Final position	Record							
Competition	First match	Last match	Starting round	Final position	Pld	W	D	L	GF	GA	GD	Win %
Bundesliga	6 August 2022	27 May 2023	Matchday 1	10th	34	11	10	13	52	55	−3	32.35
DFB-Pokal	31 July 2022	18 October 2022	First round	Second round	2	1	0	1	10	3	+7	50.00
Total					36	12	10	14	62	58	+4	33.33

Source: Soccerway

=== Bundesliga ===
==== League table ====
Pos	Team	Pld	W	D	L	GF	GA	GD	Pts
8	VfL Wolfsburg	34	13	10	11	57	48	+9	49
9	Mainz 05	34	12	10	12	54	55	−1	46
10	Borussia Mönchengladbach	34	11	10	13	52	55	−3	43
11	1. FC Köln	34	10	12	12	49	54	−5	42
12	1899 Hoffenheim	34	10	6	18	48	57	−9	36

Source: DFB
Rules for classification: 1) Points; 2) Goal difference; 3) Goals scored; 4) Head-to-head results; 5) Head-to-head away goals scored; 6) Away goals scored; 7) Play-off.

==== Results summary ====
Overall								Home						Away					
Pld	W	D	L	GF	GA	GD	Pts	W	D	L	GF	GA	GD	W	D	L	GF	GA	GD
34	11	10	13	52	55	−3	43	10	3	4	33	18	+15	1	7	9	19	37	−18

Source: DFB

==== Results by round ====
Round	1	2	3	4	5	6	7	8	9	10	11	12	13	14	15	16	17	18	19	20	21	22	23	24	25	26	27	28	29	30	31	32	33	34
Ground	H	A	H	A	H	A	H	A	H	A	H	A	H	A	H	H	A	A	H	A	H	A	H	A	H	A	H	A	H	A	H	A	A	H
Result	W	D	W	D	L	D	W	L	W	D	L	L	W	L	W	L	L	W	D	L	W	L	D	L	D	D	W	D	L	L	W	L	D	W
Position	3	3	2	6	9	8	6	9	6	6	9	11	8	9	8	8	9	8	9	10	8	10	10	10	10	10	10	10	10	10	10	11	11	10

Source: DFB
A = Away; H = Home; W = Win; D = Draw; L = Loss

==== Matches ====
The league fixtures were announced on 17 June 2022.

6 August 2022 1	Borussia Mönchengladbach	3–1	1899 Hoffenheim	Mönchengladbach
15:30 CEST (UTC+2)	Scally (yellow card) 13'; Bensebaini 42'; Thuram 71'; Elvedi 78'	Report	Posch (yellow card) 15' (yellow-red card) 19'; Samassékou (yellow card) 22'; Skov 25'; Vogt (yellow card) 75'	Stadium: Borussia-Park; Attendance: 49,659; Referee: Daniel Siebert

13 August 2022 2	Schalke 04	2–2	Borussia Mönchengladbach	Gelsenkirchen
15:30 CEST (UTC+2)	Zalazar 29', (yellow card) 45'; Krauß (yellow card) 35'; Ouwejan (yellow card) 40'; Král (yellow card) 57'; Bülter 90+3' (pen.)	Report	Koné (yellow card) 45'; Hofmann 72'; Thuram 78'; Herrmann (yellow card) 82'	Stadium: Veltins-Arena; Attendance: 62,271; Referee: Sven Jablonski

19 August 2022 3	Borussia Mönchengladbach	1–0	Hertha BSC	Mönchengladbach
20:30 CEST (UTC+2)	Pléa 34' (pen.); Hofmann (penalty missed) 70'; Herrmann (yellow card) 90+5'	Report	Uremović (yellow card) 34' (yellow-red card) 69'	Stadium: Borussia-Park; Attendance: 48,411; Referee: Matthias Jöllenbeck

27 August 2022 4	Bayern Munich	1–1	Borussia Mönchengladbach	Munich
18:30 CEST (UTC+2)	Kimmich (yellow card) 42'; Sabitzer (yellow card) 63'; Sané (yellow card) 80', (goal) 83'; Pavard (yellow card) 90+5'	Report	Pléa (yellow card) 37'; Thuram 43'; Kramer (yellow card) 90+5'	Stadium: Allianz Arena; Attendance: 75,000; Referee: Daniel Schlager

4 September 2022 5	Borussia Mönchengladbach	0–1	Mainz 05	Mönchengladbach
17:30 CEST (UTC+2)	Koné (yellow card) 26'; Itakura (red card) 53'	Report	Barreiro (yellow card) 39'; Lee (yellow card) 42'; Martín 55'; Kohr (yellow card) 88'; Zentner (yellow card) 90+5'	Stadium: Borussia-Park; Attendance: 51,210; Referee: Deniz Aytekin

11 September 2022 6	SC Freiburg	0–0	Borussia Mönchengladbach	Freiburg
17:30 CEST (UTC+2)	Günter (yellow card) 54'	Report	Bensebaini (yellow card) 62'	Stadium: Europa-Park Stadion; Attendance: 33,000; Referee: Tobias Stieler

17 September 2022 7	Borussia Mönchengladbach	3–0	RB Leipzig	Mönchengladbach
18:30 CEST (UTC+2)	Hofmann 10', 35'; Weigl (yellow card) 52'; Bensebaini 53'; Stindl (yellow card) 66'	Report	Kampl (yellow card) 25'; Henrichs (yellow card) 66'	Stadium: Borussia-Park; Attendance: 50,186; Referee: Patrick Ittrich

1 October 2022 8	Werder Bremen	5–1	Borussia Mönchengladbach	Bremen
18:30 CEST (UTC+2)	Füllkrug 5', 13'; Ducksch 8'; Bensebaini 37' (o.g.); Weiser 73'	Report	Koné (yellow card) 39'; Thuram 63'	Stadium: Weserstadion; Attendance: 42,100; Referee: Matthias Jöllenbeck

9 October 2022 9	Borussia Mönchengladbach	5–2	1. FC Köln	Mönchengladbach
15:30 CEST (UTC+2)	Stindl (yellow card) 7', (goal) 46'; Friedrich 27'; Bensebaini (yellow card) 38', (goal) 45+2' (pen.), 76'; Thuram 90+1'	Report	Kainz (yellow card) 11' (yellow-red card) 45+1', (goal) 31' (pen.); Skhiri (yellow card) 63'; Huseinbašić 83'	Stadium: Borussia-Park; Attendance: 54,042; Referee: Sven Jablonski

15 October 2022 10	VfL Wolfsburg	2–2	Borussia Mönchengladbach	Wolfsburg
15:30 CEST (UTC+2)	Gerhardt 43'; Wimmer (yellow card) 65'; Marmoush 69'; Otávio (yellow card) 81'; Arnold (yellow card) 84'	Report	Thuram 13', 48'; Weigl (yellow card) 45+2'; Stindl (yellow card) 84'; Koné (yellow card) 86'	Stadium: Volkswagen Arena; Attendance: 26,701; Referee: Benjamin Cortus

22 October 2022 11	Borussia Mönchengladbach	1–3	Eintracht Frankfurt	Mönchengladbach
18:30 CEST (UTC+2)	Koné (yellow card) 16'; Weigl (yellow card) 18'; Kramer (yellow card) 46'; Thuram 72'	Report	Lindstrøm 6', 45'; Kamada (yellow card) 25'; Dina Ebimbe 29'; Jakić (yellow card) 31'	Stadium: Borussia-Park; Attendance: 53,019; Referee: Daniel Siebert

30 October 2022 12	Union Berlin	2–1	Borussia Mönchengladbach	Berlin
15:30 CEST (UTC+2)	Michel (yellow card) 64'; Behrens 79'; Ryerson (yellow card) 90+1'; Trimmel (yellow card) 90+5'; Doekhi 90+7'	Report	Elvedi 33'; Thuram (yellow card) 67'; Sippel (yellow card) 79'	Stadium: Stadion An der Alten Försterei; Attendance: 22,012; Referee: Harm Osmers

4 November 2022 13	Borussia Mönchengladbach	3–1	VfB Stuttgart	Mönchengladbach
20:30 CET (UTC+1)	Hofmann 4'; Bensebaini (yellow card) 17'; Thuram 25', (yellow card) 88'; Herrmann 90+4'	Report	Tomás 35'; Mavropanos (yellow card) 73'	Stadium: Borussia-Park; Attendance: 53,178; Referee: Matthias Jöllenbeck

8 November 2022 14	VfL Bochum	2–1	Borussia Mönchengladbach	Bochum
20:30 CEST (UTC+2)	Hofmann 7'; Antwi-Adjei 12'; Losilla (yellow card) 78'	Report	Friedrich (yellow card) 2'; Pléa (yellow card) 44', (goal) 62'; Kramer (yellow card) 55'	Stadium: Vonovia Ruhrstadion; Attendance: 25,900; Referee: Daniel Schlager

11 November 2022 15	Borussia Mönchengladbach	4–2	Borussia Dortmund	Mönchengladbach
20:30 CET (UTC+1)	Hofmann 4'; Stindl (yellow card) 9'; Bensebaini 26'; Thuram 30'; Koné 46'	Report	Brandt 19'; Hummels (yellow card) 25'; Guerreiro (yellow card) 34'; Schlotterbeck 40'	Stadium: Borussia-Park; Attendance: 54,042; Referee: Sven Jablonski

22 January 2023 16	Borussia Mönchengladbach	2–3	Bayer Leverkusen	Mönchengladbach
17:30 CET (UTC+1)	Koné (yellow card) 44'; Stindl 82', 90+3', (yellow card) 90+6'; Weigl (yellow card) 89'	Report	Bakker 21', (yellow card) 90+6'; Adli 43'; Amiri 67'; Sinkgraven (yellow card) 90+5'	Stadium: Borussia-Park; Attendance: 53,336; Referee: Harm Osmers

25 January 2023 17	FC Augsburg	1–0	Borussia Mönchengladbach	Augsburg
20:30 CET (UTC+1)	Berisha 82'; Dorsch (yellow card) 84'	Report	Lainer (yellow card) 31'; Pléa (yellow card) 66'	Stadium: WWK Arena; Attendance: 23,158; Referee: Daniel Schlager

28 January 2023 18	1899 Hoffenheim	1–4	Borussia Mönchengladbach	Sinsheim
15:30 CET (UTC+1)	Angeliño (yellow card) 15'; Brooks (yellow card) 22'; Bebou 80'	Report	Hofmann 12', 36'; Koné (yellow card) 68'; Stindl 83'; Wolf 90+1'	Stadium: Rhein-Neckar-Arena; Attendance: 24,119; Referee: Benjamin Brand

4 February 2023 19	Borussia Mönchengladbach	0–0	Schalke 04	Mönchengladbach
18:30 CET (UTC+1)	Weigl (yellow card) 34'; Hofmann (yellow card) 76'	Report	Balanta (yellow card) 6'; Jenz (yellow card) 14'; Kozuki (yellow card) 65'	Stadium: Borussia-Park; Attendance: 54,042; Referee: Deniz Aytekin

12 February 2023 20	Hertha BSC	4–1	Borussia Mönchengladbach	Berlin
15:30 CET (UTC+1)	Ngankam 30'; Dardai 52'; Uremović (yellow card) 87'; Scherhant 90+1'; Lukebakio 90+7' (pen.)	Report	Elvedi 17'; Koné (yellow card) 90+6'	Stadium: Olympiastadion; Attendance: 40,973; Referee: Christian Dingert

18 February 2023 21	Borussia Mönchengladbach	3–2	Bayern Munich	Mönchengladbach
15:30 CET (UTC+1)	Stindl 13'; Hofmann 55'; Thuram 84'	Report	Upamecano (red card) 8'; Choupo-Moting 35'; Goretzka (yellow card) 37'; Tel 90+3'	Stadium: Borussia-Park; Attendance: 54,042; Referee: Tobias Welz

24 February 2023 22	Mainz 05	4–0	Borussia Mönchengladbach	Mainz
20:30 CET (UTC+1)	Lee 25'; Caci (yellow card) 36'; Ingvartsen 49'; Hanche-Olsen (yellow card) 50'; Ajorque 72'; Weiper 90+3'	Report	Stindl (yellow card) 66'; Pléa (yellow card) 74'; Koné (yellow card) 83'	Stadium: Mewa Arena; Attendance: 32,500; Referee: Robert Hartmann

4 March 2023 23	Borussia Mönchengladbach	0–0	SC Freiburg	Mönchengladbach
15:30 CET (UTC+1)	Stindl (yellow card) 15'; Elvedi (yellow card) 40'; Thuram (yellow card) 84'; Bensebaini (yellow card) 87' (yellow-red card) 87'	Report	Lienhart (yellow card) 67'; Höfler (yellow card) 90+2'	Stadium: Borussia-Park; Attendance: 53,014; Referee: Benjamin Brand

11 March 2023 24	RB Leipzig	3–0	Borussia Mönchengladbach	Leipzig
15:30 CET (UTC+1)	Raum (yellow card) 52'; Werner 57'; Forsberg 71' (pen.); Gvardiol 80'	Report	Pléa (penalty missed) 53'	Stadium: Red Bull Arena; Attendance: 46,687; Referee: Matthias Jöllenbeck

17 March 2023 25	Borussia Mönchengladbach	2–2	Werder Bremen	Mönchengladbach
20:30 CET (UTC+1)	Thuram 48'; Neuhaus 73', (yellow card) 87'	Report	Ducksch 65', 89'; Weiser (yellow card) 81'	Stadium: Borussia-Park; Attendance: 54,042; Referee: Tobias Reichel

1 April 2023 26	1. FC Köln	0–0	Borussia Mönchengladbach	Cologne
15:30 CEST (UTC+2)	Schmitz (yellow card) 33'; Kainz (yellow card) 73'; Huseinbašić (yellow card) 82'; Tigges (yellow card) 90+3'	Report	Koné (yellow card) 21'; Scally (yellow card) 35'; Bensebaini (yellow card) 59'	Stadium: RheinEnergieStadion; Attendance: 50,000; Referee: Felix Zwayer

9 April 2023 27	Borussia Mönchengladbach	2–0	VfL Wolfsburg	Mönchengladbach
15:30 CEST (UTC+2)	Ngoumou 34'; Thuram 63'	Report	Lacroix (yellow card) 52'	Stadium: Borussia-Park; Attendance: 51,127; Referee: Timo Gerach

15 April 2023 28	Eintracht Frankfurt	1–1	Borussia Mönchengladbach	Frankfurt
18:30 CEST (UTC+2)	Kamada (yellow card) 68'; Kolo Muani 83'	Report	Hofmann 13'; Stindl (yellow card) 77'; Koné (yellow card) 86'	Stadium: Deutsche Bank Park; Attendance: 50,000; Referee: Sven Jablonski

22 April 2023 29	Borussia Mönchengladbach	0–1	Union Berlin	Mönchengladbach
19:30 CEST (UTC+2)	Itakura (yellow card) 8'; Neuhaus (yellow card) 24'; Elvedi (yellow card) 45'	Report	Laïdouni (yellow card) 33'; Behrens (yellow card) 35'; Becker 60'	Stadium: Borussia-Park; Attendance: 52,107; Referee: Martin Petersen

29 April 2023 30	VfB Stuttgart	2–1	Borussia Mönchengladbach	Stuttgart
15:30 CEST (UTC+2)	Guirassy 22'; Zagadou (yellow card) 77'; Coulibaly 83' (pen.); Karazor (yellow card) 85'	Report	Weigl (yellow card) 45+1', (goal) 78' (pen.); Lainer (yellow card) 61'; Itakura (red card) 82'	Stadium: Mercedes-Benz Arena; Attendance: 45,000; Referee: Tobias Welz

6 May 2023 31	Borussia Mönchengladbach	2–0	VfL Bochum	Mönchengladbach
15:30 CEST (UTC+2)	Hofmann 35'; Pléa (yellow card) 57'; Stindl 90+1'	Report	Hofmann (yellow card) 41'; Stafylidis (yellow card) 85'	Stadium: Borussia-Park; Attendance: 53,797; Referee: Robert Schröder

13 May 2023 32	Borussia Dortmund	5–2	Borussia Mönchengladbach	Dortmund
18:30 CEST (UTC+2)	Malen 5'; Bellingham 18' (pen.); Haller 20', 32'; Reyna 90+4'	Report	Bensebaini 75' (pen.), (yellow card) 77'; Stindl 85'; Kramer (yellow card) 90+4'	Stadium: Signal Iduna Park; Attendance: 81,365; Referee: Daniel Schlager

21 May 2023 33	Bayer Leverkusen	2–2	Borussia Mönchengladbach	Leverkusen
19:30 CEST (UTC+2)	Adli 15'; Demirbay 20', (yellow card) 45'; Palacios (yellow card) 77'; Amiri (yellow card) 81'; Hincapié (red card) 90+4'	Report	Koné (yellow card) 35'; Friedrich (yellow card) 47'; Hofmann 58'; Stindl (yellow card) 70', (goal) 90'	Stadium: BayArena; Attendance: 30,210; Referee: Daniel Siebert

27 May 2023 34	Borussia Mönchengladbach	2–0	FC Augsburg	Mönchengladbach
15:30 CEST (UTC+2)	Netz 4'; Hofmann 40'	Report	Gumny (red card) 45+3'; Valentin (yellow card) 67'	Stadium: Borussia-Park; Attendance: 52,186; Referee: Matthias Jöllenbeck

=== DFB-Pokal ===
31 July 2022 First round	SV Oberachern	1–9	Borussia Mönchengladbach	Freiburg
15:31 CEST (UTC+2)	Huber 61'	Report	Thuram 2', 22', 36'; Hofmann 37', 45+3'; Bensebaini 45'; Stindl 47'; Scally 59'; Neuhaus 78'	Stadium: Dreisamstadion; Attendance: 13,558; Referee: Nicolas Winter
Note: The match took place at the Dreisamstadion instead of SV Oberachern's home stadium, the Waldsportplatz in Achern.

18 October 2022 Second round	Darmstadt 98	2–1	Borussia Mönchengladbach	Darmstadt
20:45 CEST (UTC+2)	Tietz 23'; Kempe (yellow card) 40'; Holland (yellow card) 57'; Mehlem (yellow card) 63'; Karic (yellow card) 78'; Seydel 79'	Report	Weigl (yellow card) 43'; Netz 48'	Stadium: Merck-Stadion am Böllenfalltor; Attendance: 15,850; Referee: Robert Schröder

== Statistics ==
=== Appearances and goals ===
No.	Pos	Nat	Player	Total		Bundesliga		DFB-Pokal	
No.	Pos	Nat	Player	Apps	Goals	Apps	Goals	Apps	Goals
Goalkeepers
1	GK	(Switzerland) SUI	Jonas Omlin	7	0	7	0	0	0
21	GK	(Germany) GER	Tobias Sippel	7	0	5+1	0	0+1	0
41	GK	(Germany) GER	Jan Olschowsky	2	0	2	0	0	0
Defenders
3	DF	(Japan) JPN	Ko Itakura	16	0	14+1	0	1	0
5	DF	(Germany) GER	Marvin Friedrich	16	1	10+5	1	1	0
18	DF	(Austria) AUT	Stefan Lainer	11	0	4+6	0	0+1	0
20	DF	(Germany) GER	Luca Netz	13	1	3+8	0	1+1	1
24	DF	(Germany) GER	Tony Jantschke	6	0	1+5	0	0	0
25	DF	(Algeria) ALG	Ramy Bensebaini	23	6	21	5	1+1	1
29	DF	(United States) USA	Joe Scally	24	1	20+2	0	2	1
30	DF	(Switzerland) SUI	Nico Elvedi	24	3	22	3	2	0
Midfielders
6	MF	(Germany) GER	Christoph Kramer	24	0	23	0	1	0
8	DF	(Germany) GER	Julian Weigl	17	0	14+2	0	1	0
11	MF	(Austria) AUT	Hannes Wolf	12	1	3+9	1	0	0
17	MF	(France) FRA	Manu Koné	24	1	23	1	1	0
22	MF	(Denmark) DEN	Oscar Fraulo	1	0	0+1	0	0	0
23	MF	(Germany) GER	Jonas Hofmann	23	10	21	8	2	2
32	MF	(Germany) GER	Florian Neuhaus	15	1	7+7	0	1	1
34	MF	(Republic of Ireland) IRL	Conor Noß	0	0	0	0	0	0
Forwards
7	FW	(Germany) GER	Patrick Herrmann	20	1	0+18	1	0+2	0
10	FW	(France) FRA	Marcus Thuram	25	14	21+2	11	2	3
13	FW	(Germany) GER	Lars Stindl	21	6	14+5	5	1+1	1
14	FW	(France) FRA	Alassane Pléa	22	2	16+4	2	2	0
19	FW	(France) FRA	Nathan Ngoumou	13	0	3+9	0	1	0
35	FW	(Australia) AUS	Jacob Italiano	0	0	0	0	0	0
38	FW	(Luxembourg) LUX	Yvandro Borges Sanches	5	0	0+3	0	0+2	0
48	FW	(Germany) GER	Semir Telalovic	2	0	0+2	0	0	0
Players transferred out during the season
1	GK	(Switzerland) SUI	Yann Sommer	11	0	10	0	1	0
15	DF	(Germany) GER	Jordan Beyer	0	0	0	0	0	0
26	MF	(Germany) GER	Torben Müsel	0	0	0	0	0	0
27	MF	(Germany) GER	Rocco Reitz	2	0	0+1	0	0+1	0
33	GK	(Germany) GER	Moritz Nicolas	1	0	0	0	1	0

Last updated: 11 March 2023
Source: Competitions

=== Goalscorers ===
Rank	Pos.	No.	Nat.	Player	Bundesliga	DFB-Pokal	Total
1	FW	10	(France)	Marcus Thuram	11	3	14
2	MF	23	(Germany)	Jonas Hofmann	8	2	10
3	FW	13	(Germany)	Lars Stindl	5	1	6
3	DF	25	(Algeria)	Ramy Bensebaini	5	1	6
5	DF	30	(Switzerland)	Nico Elvedi	3	0	3
6	FW	14	(France)	Alassane Pléa	2	0	2
7	DF	5	(Germany)	Marvin Friedrich	1	0	1
7	FW	7	(Germany)	Patrick Herrmann	1	0	1
7	MF	11	(Austria)	Hannes Wolf	1	0	1
7	MF	17	(France)	Manu Koné	1	0	1
7	DF	20	(Germany)	Luca Netz	0	1	1
7	DF	29	(United States)	Joe Scally	0	1	1
7	MF	32	(Germany)	Florian Neuhaus	0	1	1
Totals					38	10	48
