= 2023–24 Borussia Mönchengladbach season =

Borussia Mönchengladbach
2023–24 season
- President: Rolf Königs
- Head coach: Gerardo Seoane
- Stadium: Borussia-Park
- Bundesliga: 14th
- DFB-Pokal: Quarter-finals
- Top goalscorer: League: Robin Hack (9); All: Robin Hack (12)
- Highest home attendance: 54,042
- Average home league attendance: 51,371
Home colours	Away colours	Third colours

The 2023–24 season was Borussia Mönchengladbach's 124th season in existence and 16th consecutive season in the Bundesliga. They also competed in the DFB-Pokal.

== Players ==
As of 17 January 2024

Note: Flags indicate national team as defined under FIFA eligibility rules; some limited exceptions apply. Players may hold more than one non-FIFA nationality.

No.	Pos.	Nation	Player
1	GK	SUI	Jonas Omlin
2	DF	ITA	Fabio Chiarodia
3	DF	JPN	Ko Itakura
4	DF	FRA	Mamadou Doucouré
5	DF	GER	Marvin Friedrich
6	MF	GER	Christoph Kramer
7	FW	GER	Patrick Herrmann
8	MF	GER	Julian Weigl
9	MF	FRA	Franck Honorat
10	MF	GER	Florian Neuhaus
13	FW	USA	Jordan Pefok (on loan from Union Berlin)
14	FW	FRA	Alassane Pléa
17	MF	FRA	Manu Koné
18	DF	AUT	Stefan Lainer
19	MF	FRA	Nathan Ngoumou

No.	Pos.	Nation	Player
20	DF	GER	Luca Netz
21	GK	GER	Tobias Sippel
24	DF	GER	Tony Jantschke
25	MF	GER	Robin Hack
26	DF	GER	Lukas Ullrich
27	MF	GER	Rocco Reitz
28	FW	ARM	Grant-Leon Ranos
29	DF	USA	Joe Scally
30	DF	SUI	Nico Elvedi
31	FW	CZE	Tomáš Čvančara
33	GK	GER	Moritz Nicolas
39	DF	AUT	Maximilian Wöber (on loan from Leeds United)
41	GK	GER	Jan Olschowsky
43	GK	GER	Max Brüll
45	DF	GER	Simon Walde

=== On loan ===
Note: Flags indicate national team as defined under FIFA eligibility rules; some limited exceptions apply. Players may hold more than one non-FIFA nationality.

No.	Pos.	Nation	Player
—	MF	DEN	Oscar Fraulo (at FC Utrecht until 30 June 2024)
—	GK	GER	Jonas Kersken (at Arminia Bielefeld until 30 June 2024)
—	FW	LUX	Yvandro Borges Sanches (at NEC Nijmegen until 30 June 2024)

== Transfers ==
=== In ===
Pos.	Player	Transferred from	Fee	Date	Source
DF	(Italy) Fabio Chiarodia	(Germany) Werder Bremen	€2,100,000	1 July 2023	
MF	(Germany) Robin Hack	(Germany) Arminia Bielefeld	€1,200,000	1 July 2023	
FW	(Armenia) Grant-Leon Ranos	(Germany) Bayern Munich II	Free	1 July 2023	
DF	(Germany) Lukas Ullrich	(Germany) Hertha BSC II	Free	1 July 2023	
MF	(Germany) Julian Weigl	(Portugal) Benfica	€7,180,000	1 July 2023	
MF	(France) Franck Honorat	(France) Brest	€8,000,000	11 July 2023	
FW	(Czech Republic) Tomáš Čvančara	(Czech Republic) Sparta Prague	€10,500,000	14 July 2023	
DF	(Austria) Maximilian Wöber	(England) Leeds United	Loan	31 July 2023	
FW	(United States) Jordan Pefok	(Germany) Union Berlin	Loan	31 August 2023	

=== Out ===
Pos.	Player	Transferred to	Fee	Date	Source
DF	(Algeria) Ramy Bensebaini	(Germany) Borussia Dortmund	Free	1 July 2023	
DF	(Germany) Jordan Beyer	(England) Burnley	€15,100,000	1 July 2023	
GK	(Germany) Jonas Kersken	(Germany) Arminia Bielefeld	Loan	1 July 2023	
MF	(Germany) Lars Stindl	(Germany) Karlsruher SC	Free	1 July 2023	
MF	(France) Marcus Thuram	(Italy) Inter Milan	Free	1 July 2023	
MF	(Germany) Jonas Hofmann	(Germany) Bayer Leverkusen	€10,000,000	5 July 2023	
MF	(Republic of Ireland) Conor Noß	(Austria) Blau-Weiß Linz	Undisclosed	18 July 2023	
MF	(Denmark) Oscar Fraulo	(Netherlands) FC Utrecht	Loan	23 August 2023	
FW	(Germany) Semir Telalović	(England) Blackburn Rovers	Undisclosed	1 September 2023	
FW	(Luxembourg) Yvandro Borges Sanches	(Netherlands) NEC Nijmegen	Loan	10 January 2024	
MF	(Austria) Hannes Wolf	(United States) New York City FC	Free	16 January 2024	

== Pre-season and friendlies ==
Win Draw Loss Fixtures

15 July 2023 Friendly	Wegberg-Beeck	1–1	Borussia Mönchengladbach	Wegberg
16:00 CEST (UTC+2)	Kleefisch 41'	Report	Ullrich 82'	Stadium: Waldstadion; Referee: Rene Heinen

22 July 2023 Friendly	1. FC Saarbrücken	1–2	Borussia Mönchengladbach	Saarbrücken
15:00 CEST (UTC+2)	Brünker 85'	Report	Čvančara 3'; Ngoumou 10'; Neuhaus (yellow card) 38'	Stadium: Stadion Ludwigspark; Attendance: 11,000; Referee: Tom Bauer

26 July 2023 Friendly	Borussia Mönchengladbach	2–1	FC Ingolstadt	Rottach-Egern
18:00 CEST (UTC+2)	Hack 48'; Ngoumou 58'		Malone (yellow card) 17'; Keidel 87'	Stadium: Sportplatz Birkenmoos

29 July 2023 Friendly	1860 Munich	1–2	Borussia Mönchengladbach	Heimstetten
15:00 CEST (UTC+2)	Starke 16'	Report	Ranos 8'; Fukuda 32'
Note: Match was played in two 30-minute periods.

29 July 2023 Friendly	VfB Stuttgart	1–5	Borussia Mönchengladbach	Heimstetten
16:15 CEST (UTC+2)	Silas 32'	Report	Ngoumou 10', 45'; Čvančara 14', 48', 56'
Note: Match was played in two 30-minute periods.

5 August 2023 Friendly	Borussia Mönchengladbach	2–2	Montpellier	Mönchengladbach
15:30 CEST (UTC+2)	Ranos 30'; Weigl 35'	Report	Savanier 42'; Al-Taamari 45'	Stadium: Borussia-Park; Attendance: 13,000; Referee: Robin Braun

7 September 2023 Friendly	Borussia Mönchengladbach	0–1	Werder Bremen	Willingen
17:30 CEST (UTC+2)		Report	Njinmah 85'	Stadium: Uplandstadion; Attendance: 3,200; Referee: Tim Waldinger

12 October 2023 Friendly	Borussia Mönchengladbach	4–1	Sint-Truiden	Mönchengladbach
13:00 CEST (UTC+2)	Ngoumou 24'; Herrmann 26', 42'; Koné 77'	Report	Wolf 62' (o.g.)	Stadium: Fohlenplatz; Attendance: 525; Referee: Thibaut Scheer

6 January 2024 Friendly	Borussia Mönchengladbach	3–2	Go Ahead Eagles	Mönchengladbach
13:00 CET (UTC+1)	Pléa 18'; Hack 49'; Fukuda 113'		Edvardsen 80'; Serra 88'	Stadium: Fohlenplatz
Note: Match was played in two periods of 60 minutes.

21 March 2024 Friendly	Borussia Mönchengladbach	2–0	Eupen	Mönchengladbach
13:00 CET (UTC+1)	Fukuda 14', 49'	Report		Stadium: Fohlenplatz

21 May 2024 Friendly	VfL Jüchen-Garzweiler	1–5	Borussia Mönchengladbach	Jüchen
19:00 CEST (UTC+2)	Ahmeti 80'	Report	Neuhaus 40'; Ngoumou 42'; Sauck 50'; Boteli 83'; Sippel 86'	Stadium: Bezirkssportanlage Jüchen; Attendance: 1,500

== Competitions ==
=== Overall record ===
Competition	First match	Last match	Starting round	Final position	Record							
Competition	First match	Last match	Starting round	Final position	Pld	W	D	L	GF	GA	GD	Win %
Bundesliga	19 August 2023	18 May 2024	Matchday 1	14th	34	7	13	14	56	67	−11	20.59
DFB-Pokal	11 August 2023	12 March 2024	First round	Quarter-finals	4	3	0	1	12	3	+9	75.00
Total					38	10	13	15	68	70	−2	26.32

Source: Soccerway

=== Bundesliga ===
==== League table ====
Pos	Team	Pld	W	D	L	GF	GA	GD	Pts	Qualification or relegation
12	VfL Wolfsburg	34	10	7	17	41	56	−15	37	
13	Mainz 05	34	7	14	13	39	51	−12	35	
14	Borussia Mönchengladbach	34	7	13	14	56	67	−11	34	
15	Union Berlin	34	9	6	19	33	58	−25	33	
16	VfL Bochum (O)	34	7	12	15	42	74	−32	33	Qualification for the relegation play-offs

Source: DFB
Rules for classification: 1) Points; 2) Goal difference; 3) Goals scored; 4) Head-to-head results; 5) Head-to-head away goals scored; 6) Away goals scored; 7) Play-off.
(O) Play-off winners

==== Results summary ====
Overall								Home						Away					
Pld	W	D	L	GF	GA	GD	Pts	W	D	L	GF	GA	GD	W	D	L	GF	GA	GD
34	7	13	14	56	67	−11	34	5	6	6	27	26	+1	2	7	8	29	41	−12

Source: DFB

==== Results by round ====
Round	1	2	3	4	5	6	7	8	9	10	11	12	13	14	15	16	17	18	19	20	21	22	23	24	25	26	27	28	29	30	31	32	33	34
Ground	A	H	H	A	H	A	H	A	H	A	H	A	H	A	H	A	H	H	A	A	H	A	H	A	H	A	H	A	H	A	H	A	H	A
Result	D	L	L	D	L	W	D	L	W	D	W	L	W	L	D	L	W	L	D	L	D	L	W	D	D	D	L	W	L	L	D	D	D	L
Position	9	12	16	14	15	13	12	13	11	11	9	11	10	10	11	12	10	12	12	13	13	15	12	12	12	12	13	11	11	12	13	13	13	14

Source: DFB
A = Away; H = Home; W = Win; D = Draw; L = Loss

==== Matches ====
The league fixtures were unveiled on 30 June 2023.

19 August 2023 1	FC Augsburg	4–4	Borussia Mönchengladbach	Augsburg
15:30 CEST (UTC+2)	Dorsch (yellow card) 23'; Rexhbeçaj 29'; Bauer 41'; Michel 45+7' (pen.); Vargas 76'	Report	Itakura 13'; Čvančara 27', 90+7' (pen.), (yellow card) 32'; Ngoumou 37'; Neuhaus (yellow card) 45+1'	Stadium: WWK Arena; Attendance: 30,660; Referee: Daniel Schlager

26 August 2023 2	Borussia Mönchengladbach	0–3	Bayer Leverkusen	Mönchengladbach
18:30 CEST (UTC+2)	Čvančara (yellow card) 45+3'; Itakura (yellow card) 45+5'	Report	Boniface (yellow card) 16', (goal) 18', 53'; Frimpong (yellow card) 45+3'; Tah (yellow card) 45+4', (goal) 45+6'	Stadium: Borussia-Park; Attendance: 54,042; Referee: Christian Dingert

2 September 2023 3	Borussia Mönchengladbach	1–2	Bayern Munich	Mönchengladbach
18:30 CEST (UTC+2)	Itakura 30'	Report	Mazraoui (yellow card) 22'; Sané 58'; Coman (yellow card) 60'; Tel 87'	Stadium: Borussia-Park; Attendance: 54,042; Referee: Deniz Aytekin

17 September 2023 4	Darmstadt 98	3–3	Borussia Mönchengladbach	Darmstadt
17:30 CEST (UTC+2)	Mehlem 8'; Maglica 10', (red card) 49'; Skarke 33'; Schuhen (yellow card) 64'	Report	Itakura (yellow card) 33'; Čvančara (penalty missed) 50', 77'; Pefok 56'; Neuhaus 73'	Stadium: Merck-Stadion am Böllenfalltor; Attendance: 17,810; Referee: Timo Gerach

23 September 2023 5	Borussia Mönchengladbach	0–1	RB Leipzig	Mönchengladbach
15:30 CEST (UTC+2)	Scally (yellow card) 65'	Report	Werner 75'	Stadium: Borussia-Park; Attendance: 50,122; Referee: Robert Schröder

30 September 2023 6	VfL Bochum	1–3	Borussia Mönchengladbach	Bochum
15:30 CEST (UTC+2)	Bernardo (yellow card) 52'; Losilla 68'; Gamboa (yellow card) 90+10'	Report	Neuhaus 27'; Pléa 37', 45+3'; Itakura (yellow card) 45+1'; Kramer (yellow card) 81'; Čvančara (yellow card) 90+10'	Stadium: Vonovia Ruhrstadion; Attendance: 26,000; Referee: Felix Brych

6 October 2023 7	Borussia Mönchengladbach	2–2	Mainz 05	Mönchengladbach
20:30 CEST (UTC+2)	Neuhaus 22'; Itakura (yellow card) 56'; Koné (yellow card) 81'; Hack (yellow card) 82'; Scally 88'	Report	Gruda 24'; Bell (yellow card) 66'; Barkok 75'	Stadium: Borussia-Park; Attendance: 51,529; Referee: Sven Jablonski

22 October 2023 8	1. FC Köln	3–1	Borussia Mönchengladbach	Cologne
15:30 CEST (UTC+2)	Kainz 9' (pen.), 76' (pen.); Waldschmidt 90'	Report	Elvedi 63'; Koné (red card) 72'; Nicolas (yellow card) 74'; Scally (yellow card) 90+5'	Stadium: RheinEnergieStadion; Attendance: 50,000; Referee: Deniz Aytekin

28 October 2023 9	Borussia Mönchengladbach	2–1	1. FC Heidenheim	Mönchengladbach
15:30 CEST (UTC+2)	Pléa 4'; Föhrenbach 51' (o.g.)	Report	Dinkçi 38', (yellow card) 45+2'; Pick (yellow card) 61'; Pieringer (yellow card) 77'	Stadium: Borussia-Park; Attendance: 51,541; Referee: Robert Hartmann

4 November 2023 10	SC Freiburg	3–3	Borussia Mönchengladbach	Freiburg
15:30 CET (UTC+1)	Höler 7'; Lienhart (yellow card) 37'; Ginter (yellow card) 50'; Weißhaupt 70'; Grifo 90+6' (pen.)	Report	Pefok 25'; Pléa 29'; Weigl 39' (pen.), (yellow card) 90+1'; Netz (yellow card) 79'	Stadium: Europa-Park Stadion; Attendance: 34,700; Referee: Felix Brych

10 November 2023 11	Borussia Mönchengladbach	4–0	VfL Wolfsburg	Mönchengladbach
20:30 CET (UTC+1)	Čvančara 16'; Elvedi (yellow card) 29'; Reitz 42'; Honorat 64'; Pléa 71'	Report	Arnold (yellow card) 33'; Vranckx (yellow card) 69'; Cozza (yellow card) 83'	Stadium: Borussia-Park; Attendance: 45,308; Referee: Felix Zwayer

25 November 2023 12	Borussia Dortmund	4–2	Borussia Mönchengladbach	Dortmund
15:30 CET (UTC+1)	Sabitzer 30'; Füllkrug 32'; Bynoe-Gittens 45'; Brandt (yellow card) 81'; Malen 90+7'	Report	Reitz 13'; Koné 28', (yellow card) 87'; Weigl (yellow card) 54'	Stadium: Signal Iduna Park; Attendance: 81,365; Referee: Sven Jablonski

2 December 2023 13	Borussia Mönchengladbach	2–1	1899 Hoffenheim	Mönchengladbach
15:30 CET (UTC+1)	Elvedi (yellow card) 54'; Pléa 58' (pen.); Ngoumou 80'; Reitz (yellow card) 82'	Report	Tohumcu (yellow card) 50'; Weghorst 60'; Akpoguma (yellow card) 88'	Stadium: Borussia-Park; Attendance: 49,341; Referee: Tobias Reichel

9 December 2023 14	Union Berlin	3–1	Borussia Mönchengladbach	Berlin
15:30 CET (UTC+1)	Volland 24' (pen.); Juranović (yellow card) 29'; Hollerbach 50'; Kaufmann 75'	Report	Scally (yellow card) 3'; Weigl (yellow card) 33'; Pléa (yellow card) 47', (goal) 77'	Stadium: Stadion An der Alten Försterei; Attendance: 22,012; Referee: Martin Petersen

15 December 2023 15	Borussia Mönchengladbach	2–2	Werder Bremen	Mönchengladbach
20:30 CET (UTC+1)	Wöber (yellow card) 34'; Reitz 45', 49'; Honorat (yellow card) 45+5'; Weigl (yellow card) 66'; Kramer (yellow card) 90+4'	Report	Borré 7'; Weiser (yellow card) 45+5'; Schmid (yellow card) 51'; Ducksch 76'	Stadium: Borussia-Park; Attendance: 50,660; Referee: Felix Zwayer

20 December 2023 16	Eintracht Frankfurt	2–1	Borussia Mönchengladbach	Frankfurt
20:30 CET (UTC+1)	Pacho (yellow card) 71'; Buta 90+2'; Koch 90+7'; Buck (yellow card) 90+7'	Report	Wöber 27', (yellow card) 69' (yellow-red card) 88'; Elvedi (yellow card) 35'; Koné (yellow card) 49'; Scally (yellow card) 79'; Nicolas (yellow card) 90+6'	Stadium: Deutsche Bank Park; Attendance: 58,000; Referee: Florian Badstübner

14 January 2024 17	Borussia Mönchengladbach	3–1	VfB Stuttgart	Mönchengladbach
17:30 CET (UTC+1)	Hack 1', 19'; Weigl (yellow card) 35'; Elvedi (yellow card) 70'; Pefok 90+1'; Kramer (yellow card) 90+5'	Report	Mittelstädt (yellow card) 45+3'; Vagnoman 56'; Millot (yellow card) 83'; Raimund (yellow card) 84'	Stadium: Borussia-Park; Attendance: 53,439; Referee: Harm Osmers

21 January 2024 18	Borussia Mönchengladbach	1–2	FC Augsburg	Mönchengladbach
17:30 CET (UTC+1)	Pefok 26'; Netz (yellow card) 67'	Report	Rexhbeçaj (yellow card) 41'; Tietz 47'; Engels 51'; Jakić (yellow card) 80'	Stadium: Borussia-Park; Attendance: 44,867; Referee: Martin Petersen

27 January 2024 19	Bayer Leverkusen	0–0	Borussia Mönchengladbach	Leverkusen
18:30 CET (UTC+1)	Xhaka (yellow card) 47'; Schick (yellow card) 66'; Stanišić (yellow card) 74'	Report	Weigl (yellow card) 81'	Stadium: BayArena; Attendance: 30,210; Referee: Deniz Aytekin

3 February 2024 20	Bayern Munich	3–1	Borussia Mönchengladbach	Munich
15:30 CET (UTC+1)	Pavlović 45'; Kane 70'; De Ligt 86'	Report	Neuhaus (yellow card) 30'; Elvedi 35'	Stadium: Allianz Arena; Attendance: 75,000; Referee: Tobias Stieler

10 February 2024 21	Borussia Mönchengladbach	0–0	Darmstadt 98	Mönchengladbach
15:30 CET (UTC+1)		Report	Zimmermann (yellow card) 56'; Skarke (yellow card) 65'; Schuhen (yellow card) 75'; Müller (yellow card) 82'; Maglica (yellow card) 90+2'	Stadium: Borussia-Park; Attendance: 46,121; Referee: Sascha Stegemann

17 February 2024 22	RB Leipzig	2–0	Borussia Mönchengladbach	Leipzig
18:30 CET (UTC+1)	Simons 14'; Schlager (yellow card) 27'; Openda 57'	Report	Elvedi (yellow card) 8'; Itakura (yellow card) 33'; Koné (yellow card) 44'; Weigl (yellow card) 46'; Pefok (yellow card) 83'	Stadium: Red Bull Arena; Attendance: 44,822; Referee: Sören Storks

24 February 2024 23	Borussia Mönchengladbach	5–2	VfL Bochum	Mönchengladbach
15:30 CET (UTC+1)	Ngoumou 28'; Weigl 35' (pen.); Lainer (yellow card) 45+2'; Neuhaus (yellow card) 45+4'; Reitz 72'; Pefok 78'; Honorat 90+6'	Report	Mašović (yellow card) 30'; Riemann (yellow card) 45+4'; Stöger (yellow card) 45+4'; Schlotterbeck (yellow card) 64', (goal) 88'; Hofmann 75'	Stadium: Borussia-Park; Attendance: 53,196; Referee: Sven Jablonski

2 March 2024 24	Mainz 05	1–1	Borussia Mönchengladbach	Mainz
15:30 CET (UTC+1)	Burkardt 12'; Barreiro (yellow card) 50'; Kohr (yellow card) 58' (yellow-red card) 84'; Mwene (yellow card) 81'; Amiri (yellow card) 90+3'	Report	Ngoumou (yellow card) 43', (goal) 55'	Stadium: Mewa Arena; Attendance: 33,305; Referee: Robert Schröder

9 March 2024 25	Borussia Mönchengladbach	3–3	1. FC Köln	Mönchengladbach
15:30 CET (UTC+1)	Pefok (yellow card) 31'; Honorat 32'; Neuhaus (yellow card) 47'; Hack 71', 73'; Weigl (yellow card) 83'	Report	Alidou 7', 64'; Finkgräfe (yellow card) 22'; Chabot (yellow card) 39'; Hübers (yellow card) 41'; Downs 79'; Martel (yellow card) 83'	Stadium: Borussia-Park; Attendance: 54,042; Referee: Felix Zwayer

16 March 2024 26	1. FC Heidenheim	1–1	Borussia Mönchengladbach	Heidenheim
15:30 CET (UTC+1)	Traoré (yellow card) 36'; Dinkçi 66'; Schmidt (yellow card) 90+2'	Report	Hack 9'; Weigl (yellow card) 18'; Kramer (yellow card) 22'; Wöber (yellow card) 64'	Stadium: Voith-Arena; Attendance: 15,000; Referee: Martin Petersen

30 March 2024 27	Borussia Mönchengladbach	0–3	SC Freiburg	Mönchengladbach
15:30 CET (UTC+1)	Itakura (yellow card) 32'	Report	Gregoritsch 7'; Röhl 47'; Dōan 57'	Stadium: Borussia-Park; Attendance: 53,259; Referee: Christian Dingert

7 April 2024 28	VfL Wolfsburg	1–3	Borussia Mönchengladbach	Wolfsburg
17:30 CEST (UTC+2)	Baku 7'; Bornauw (yellow card) 27'; Wimmer (yellow card) 45+1'	Report	Itakura 52'; Ngoumou 58'; Hack (yellow card) 84'; Reitz 88'; Omlin (yellow card) 90+3'	Stadium: Volkswagen Arena; Attendance: 26,105; Referee: Bastian Dankert

13 April 2024 29	Borussia Mönchengladbach	1–2	Borussia Dortmund	Mönchengladbach
15:30 CEST (UTC+2)	Wöber 36'; Itakura (yellow card) 84'	Report	Maatsen (yellow card) 15'; Sabitzer 22', 28' (pen.); Adeyemi (yellow card) 45+4' (yellow-red card) 55'; Nmecha (yellow card) 90+4'	Stadium: Borussia-Park; Attendance: 54,042; Referee: Florian Badstübner

20 April 2024 30	1899 Hoffenheim	4–3	Borussia Mönchengladbach	Sinsheim
15:30 CEST (UTC+2)	Weghorst 36'; Kabak (yellow card) 49', (goal) 66'; Prömel 58'; Stach 90+1'	Report	Hack 39', 78', 89'; Itakura (yellow card) 75'; Čvančara (yellow card) 82'; Weigl (yellow card) 82'	Stadium: Rhein-Neckar-Arena; Attendance: 26,078; Referee: Sören Storks

28 April 2024 31	Borussia Mönchengladbach	0–0	Union Berlin	Mönchengladbach
15:30 CEST (UTC+2)	Lainer (yellow card) 46'; Reitz (yellow card) 89'	Report	Vogt (yellow card) 44'; Khedira (yellow card) 48'	Stadium: Borussia-Park; Attendance: 53,723; Referee: Sascha Stegemann

4 May 2024 32	Werder Bremen	2–2	Borussia Mönchengladbach	Bremen
15:30 CEST (UTC+2)	Woltemade 45', 65'	Report	Hack 8'; Neuhaus 90+1' (pen.)	Stadium: Weserstadion; Attendance: 42,100; Referee: Timo Gerach

11 May 2024 33	Borussia Mönchengladbach	1–1	Eintracht Frankfurt	Mönchengladbach
15:30 CEST (UTC+2)	Hack 9'; Itakura (yellow card) 25'	Report	Dina Ebimbe 35'	Stadium: Borussia-Park; Attendance: 54,042; Referee: Robert Schröder

18 May 2024 34	VfB Stuttgart	4–0	Borussia Mönchengladbach	Stuttgart
15:30 CEST (UTC+2)	Guirassy 23', 31'; Jeong 75'; Silas 83'; Undav (yellow card) 90+3'	Report	Friedrich (yellow card) 56'; Herrmann (yellow card) 89'	Stadium: MHPArena; Attendance: 60,000; Referee: Daniel Schlager

=== DFB-Pokal ===
11 August 2023 First round	TuS Bersenbrück	0–7	Borussia Mönchengladbach	Osnabrück
18:00 CEST (UTC+2)	Papachristodoulou (yellow card) 14'; Reimerink (yellow card) 33'	Report	Honorat 21', 56'; Ngoumou 26'; Čvančara 32', 34', (yellow card) 41'; Hack 77'; Ranos 89'	Stadium: Stadion an der Bremer Brücke; Attendance: 16,098; Referee: Alexander Sather
Note: The match took place at the Stadion an der Bremer Brücke, instead of TuS Bersenbrück's home stadium, the Hasestadion in Bersenbrück.

31 October 2023 Second round	Borussia Mönchengladbach	3–1	1. FC Heidenheim	Mönchengladbach
20:45 CET (UTC+1)	Pefok 3', 9'; Hack 44'	Report	Beck 78'	Stadium: Borussia-Park; Attendance: 41,660; Referee: Timo Gerach

5 December 2023 Round of 16	Borussia Mönchengladbach	1–0 (a.e.t.)	VfL Wolfsburg	Mönchengladbach
20:45 CET (UTC+1)	Koné 120'	Report	Arnold (yellow card) 31'; Gerhardt (yellow card) 41'	Stadium: Borussia-Park; Attendance: 39,827; Referee: Bastian Dankert

12 March 2024 Quarter-finals	1. FC Saarbrücken	2–1	Borussia Mönchengladbach	Saarbrücken
20:30 CET (UTC+1)	Naïfi 11', (yellow card) 53'; Sontheimer (yellow card) 31'; Brünker 90+3', (yellow card) 90+3'	Report	Hack 8'; Elvedi (yellow card) 29'	Stadium: Ludwigsparkstadion; Attendance: 15,903; Referee: Robert Hartmann
Note: The match was originally scheduled for 7 February 2024, but was postponed due to heavy rain.

== Statistics ==
=== Appearances and goals ===
No.	Pos	Nat	Player	Total		Bundesliga		DFB-Pokal	
No.	Pos	Nat	Player	Apps	Goals	Apps	Goals	Apps	Goals
Goalkeepers
1	GK	(Switzerland) SUI	Jonas Omlin	3	0	2	0	1	0
21	GK	(Germany) GER	Tobias Sippel	0	0	0	0	0	0
33	GK	(Germany) GER	Moritz Nicolas	24	0	22	0	2	0
41	GK	(Germany) GER	Jan Olschowsky	0	0	0	0	0	0
43	GK	(Germany) GER	Max Brüll	0	0	0	0	0	0
Defenders
2	DF	(Italy) ITA	Fabio Chiarodia	8	0	0+5	0	1+2	0
3	DF	(Japan) JPN	Ko Itakura	11	2	10	2	1	0
4	DF	(France) FRA	Mamadou Doucouré	0	0	0	0	0	0
5	DF	(Germany) GER	Marvin Friedrich	18	0	10+6	0	1+1	0
18	DF	(Austria) AUT	Stefan Lainer	6	0	2+4	0	0	0
20	DF	(Germany) GER	Luca Netz	24	0	19+2	0	3	0
24	DF	(Germany) GER	Tony Jantschke	4	0	0+3	0	0+1	0
26	DF	(Germany) GER	Lukas Ullrich	2	0	0+2	0	0	0
29	DF	(United States) USA	Joe Scally	26	1	19+4	1	3	0
30	DF	(Switzerland) SUI	Nico Elvedi	23	2	19+2	2	2	0
39	DF	(Austria) AUT	Maximilian Wöber	21	1	19	1	2	0
45	DF	(Germany) GER	Simon Walde	0	0	0	0	0	0
Midfielders
6	MF	(Germany) GER	Christoph Kramer	16	0	1+13	0	1+1	0
8	MF	(Germany) GER	Julian Weigl	25	2	22	2	3	0
9	MF	(France) FRA	Franck Honorat	26	4	21+3	2	2	2
10	MF	(Germany) GER	Florian Neuhaus	23	3	12+8	3	0+3	0
17	MF	(France) FRA	Manu Koné	18	2	14+2	1	1+1	1
19	MF	(France) FRA	Nathan Ngoumou	26	5	10+13	4	2+1	1
25	MF	(Germany) GER	Robin Hack	23	4	8+12	2	1+2	2
27	MF	(Germany) GER	Rocco Reitz	26	5	17+7	5	2	0
Forwards
7	FW	(Germany) GER	Patrick Herrmann	5	0	0+5	0	0	0
13	FW	(United States) USA	Jordan Pefok	18	7	14+3	5	1	2
14	FW	(France) FRA	Alassane Pléa	22	7	17+2	7	2+1	0
28	FW	(Armenia) ARM	Grant-Leon Ranos	10	1	0+9	0	0+1	1
31	FW	(Czech Republic) CZE	Tomáš Čvančara	16	6	6+7	4	2+1	2
49	FW	(Japan) JPN	Shio Fukuda	3	0	0+3	0	0	0
Players transferred out during the season
11	MF	(Austria) AUT	Hannes Wolf	0	0	0	0	0	0
22	MF	(Denmark) DEN	Oscar Fraulo	0	0	0	0	0	0
38	FW	(Luxembourg) LUX	Yvandro Borges Sanches	3	0	0+3	0	0	0
48	FW	(Germany) GER	Semir Telalović	0	0	0	0	0	0

Last updated: 2 March 2024
Source: Competitions

=== Goalscorers ===
As of 2 March 2024

Rank	Pos.	No.	Nat.	Player	Bundesliga	DFB-Pokal	Total
1	FW	14	(France)	Alassane Pléa	7	0	7
2	FW	13	(United States)	Jordan Pefok	5	2	7
3	FW	31	(Czech Republic)	Tomáš Čvančara	4	2	6
4	MF	27	(Germany)	Rocco Reitz	5	0	5
4	MF	19	(France)	Nathan Ngoumou	4	1	5
6	MF	25	(Germany)	Robin Hack	2	2	4
6	MF	9	(France)	Franck Honorat	2	2	4
8	MF	32	(Germany)	Florian Neuhaus	3	0	3
8	DF	3	(Japan)	Ko Itakura	2	0	2
8	DF	30	(Switzerland)	Nico Elvedi	2	0	2
8	MF	8	(Germany)	Julian Weigl	2	0	2
8	MF	17	(France)	Kouadio Koné	1	1	2
11	FW	28	(Armenia)	Grant-Leon Ranos	0	1	1
11	DF	29	(United States)	Joe Scally	1	0	1
11	DF	39	(Austria)	Maximilian Wöber	1	0	1
Own goals					1	0	1
Totals					42	11	53
