= Tomáš Čvančara =

Czech footballer (born 2000)

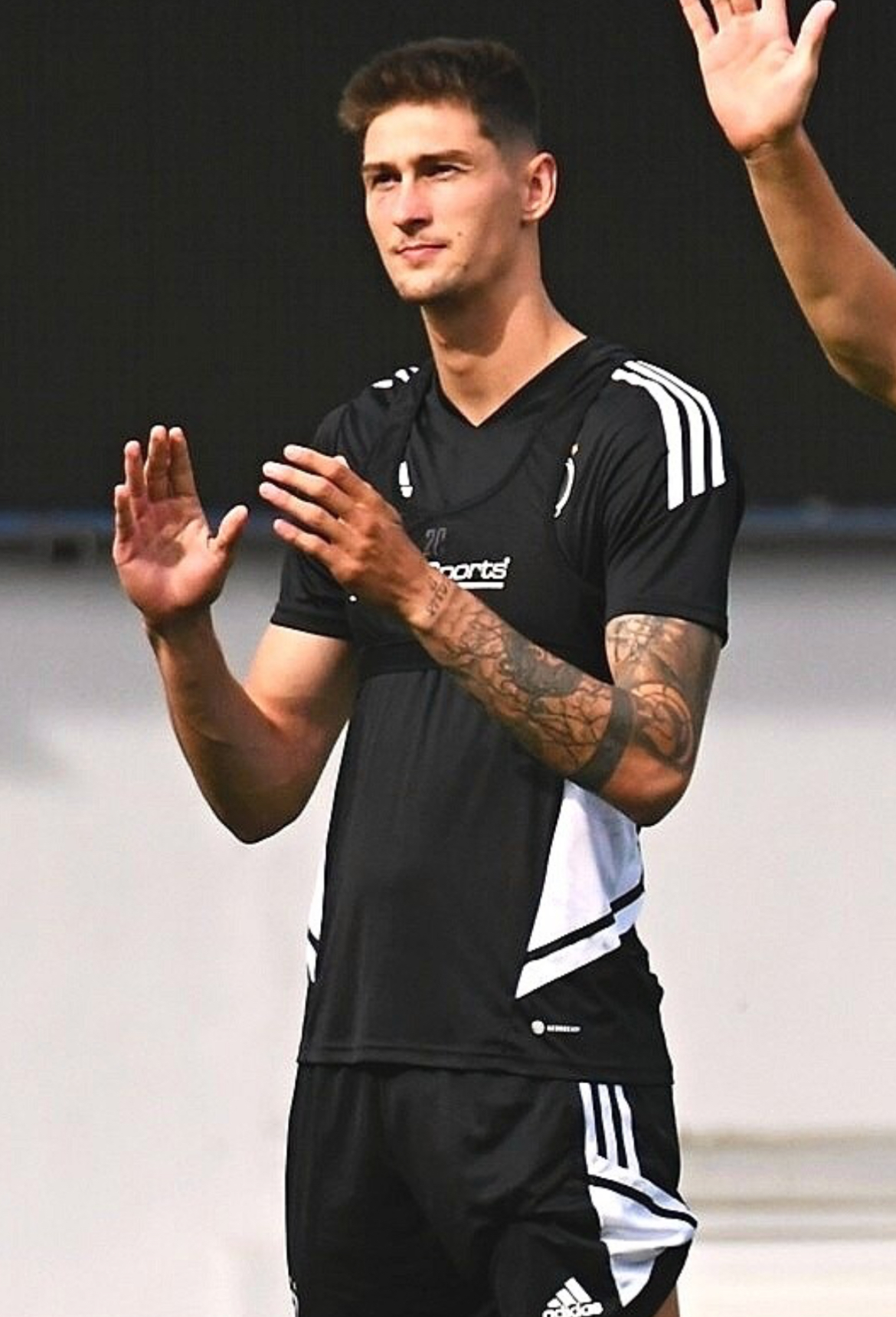
- Čvančara in 2023

Personal information
- Date of birth: 13 August 2000 (age 26)
- Place of birth: Neratovice, Czech Republic
- Height: 1.90 m (6 ft 3 in)
- Position: Forward

Team information
- Current team: Hradec Králové (on loan from Borussia Mönchengladbach)
- Number: 70

Youth career
- –2018: Slavia Prague
- 2018–2019: Jablonec
- 2019: → Empoli (loan)

Senior career*
Years	Team	Apps	(Gls)
2018–2022	Jablonec	24	(6)
2019–2020	→ Slavoj Vyšehrad (loan)	21	(13)
2021	→ Opava (loan)	10	(0)
2022–2023	Sparta Prague	39	(19)
2023–	Borussia Mönchengladbach	49	(6)
2025–2026	→ Antalyaspor (loan)	11	(1)
2026	→ Celtic (loan)	9	(2)
2026–	→ Hradec Králové (loan)	6	(2)

International career^{‡}
2017-2018	Czech Republic U18	14	(6)
2018	Czech Republic U19	1	(0)
2021–2022	Czech Republic U21	3	(1)
2023–	Czech Republic	8	(1)
- * Club domestic league appearances and goals as of 11 April 2026 ‡ National team caps and goals as of 11 October 2024

Tomáš Čvančara (born 13 August 2000) is a Czech professional footballer who plays as a forward for Czech First League club Hradec Králové, on loan from Bundesliga club Borussia Mönchengladbach, and the Czech Republic national team.

== Club career ==
=== Early career ===
On 11 March 2018, Čvančara debuted for Jablonec as a starter against Baník Ostrava in a 2–0 victory.

In January 2019, he was sent on loan to the youth academy of Serie A side Empoli, scoring one goal in 10 league matches.

Čvančara spent the 2019–20 season on loan at Czech second division club Slavoj Vyšehrad, where he scored 13 times in 21 league appearances.

At the beginning of 2020–21 Czech First League, Čvančara was sent to Opava on loan.

=== Sparta Prague ===
On 20 December 2021, Čvančara signed a multi-year contract with Czech giants Sparta Prague, playing 15 league matches and scored seven goals. On 28 January, after a fight with Sigma Olomouc defender Tomáš Vraštil, Čvančara suffered a concussion and was briefly unconscious. He missed the rest of the season due to a thigh muscle injury.

In the 2022-23 Czech First League, he scored 12 goals in 24 appearances for the club.

=== Borussia Mönchengladbach ===
On 14 July 2023, Čvančara signed a five-year contract with German Bundesliga side Borussia Mönchengladbach. On 22 July 2023, he scored in the first three minutes in his debut, a 2–1 friendly win against third-tier side 1. FC Saarbrücken. In a 5–1 friendly tournament victory against VFB Stuttgart on 29 July, Čvančara scored a hat-trick including a goal from a direct free kick.

On 11 August 2023, Čvančara scored his first two competitive goals and provided an assist on his official debut for the club in the first round of the 2023-24 DFB-Pokal against TuS Bersenbrück. On 19 August, he scored his first two league goals in a 4–4 draw with FC Augsburg, including a last-minute penalty which secured a draw.

==== Loan to Antalyaspor ====
On 26 July 2025, Čvančara joined Turkish Süper Lig club Antalyaspor on a one-year loan deal.

==== Loan to Celtic ====
On 22 January 2026, he was loaned to Scottish Premiership club Celtic until the end of the season. On 25 January he made his debut for Celtic, contributing an assist in a 2–2 draw away to Heart of Midlothian. On 1 February, Čvančara made his home debut for Celtic, scoring a header to open the scoring in a 2–0 win over Falkirk.

==== Loan to Hradec Králové ====
On 3 September 2026, he returned to his home country and joined Hradec Králové, on a loan deal until 30 June 2027.

== International career ==
On 24 March 2023, Čvančara made his debut and scored his first goal for the Czech Republic national team in a 3–1 victory against Poland during the Euro 2024 qualifiers.

Čvančara was left out of the Czech Republic squad for the March 2026 FIFA World Cup qualification play-offs due to his comments suggesting he was not currently focused on international duty. Head coach Miroslav Koubek said at a press conference that he would not prioritize selecting a player who does not consider representing the national team a priority. Koubek's response followed Čvančara's February interview, in which he described a potential call-up as an honor but not a current career goal, adding that he preferred to focus on his club performances and prove himself at Celtic.

== Career statistics ==
=== Club ===
As of match played 11 April 2026

Appearances and goals by club, season and competition
Club	Season	League			National cup (Note: Includes Czech Cup, DFB-Pokal, Turkish Cup, Scottish Cup)		Continental		Total	
Club	Season	Division	Apps	Goals	Apps	Goals	Apps	Goals	Apps	Goals
Jablonec	2017–18	Czech First League	1	0	—		—		1	0
Jablonec	2018–19	Czech First League	0	0	0	0	—		0	0
Jablonec	2020–21	Czech First League	9	1	0	0	1 (Note: Appearance(s) in UEFA Europa League)	0	10	1
Jablonec	2021–22	Czech First League	14	5	1	0	9 (Note: Two appearances in UEFA Europa League, seven appearances and four goals in UEFA Europa Conference League)	4	24	9
Jablonec	Total		24	6	1	0	10	4	35	10
Slavoj Vyšehrad (loan)	2019–20	Fortuna národní liga	21	13	1	0	—		22	13
Opava (loan)	2020–21	Czech First League	10	0	—		—		10	0
Sparta Prague	2021–22	Czech First League	15	7	2	2	2	0	19	9
Sparta Prague	2022–23	Czech First League	24	12	4	3	2	0	30	15
Sparta Prague	Total		39	19	6	5	4	0	49	24
Borussia Mönchengladbach	2023–24	Bundesliga	21	4	3	2	—		24	6
Borussia Mönchengladbach	2024–25	Bundesliga	28	2	2	0	—		30	2
Borussia Mönchengladbach	2026–27	Bundesliga	0	0	0	0	—		0	0
Borussia Mönchengladbach	Total		49	6	5	2	—		54	8
Antalyaspor (loan)	2025–26	Süper Lig	11	1	2	1	—		13	2
Celtic (loan)	2025–26	Scottish Premiership	9	2	2	0	2	0	13	2
Career total			163	47	17	8	16	4	196	59

=== International ===
As of match played 11 October 2024

Appearances and goals by national team and year
National team	Year	Apps	Goals
Czech Republic	2023	6	1
Czech Republic	2024	2	0
Total		8	1

As of match played 24 March 2023
Czech Republic score listed first, score column indicates score after each Čvančara goal.

List of international goals scored by Tomáš Čvančara
No.	Date	Venue	Cap	Opponent	Score	Result	Competition
1	24 March 2023	Fortuna Arena, Prague, Czech Republic	1	Poland	2–0	3–1	UEFA Euro 2024 qualifying

== Honours ==
Sparta Prague

- Czech First League: 2022–23

Celtic

- Scottish Premiership: 2025-26
- Scottish Cup: 2025-26
