= Shiō Fukuda =

Japanese footballer (born 2004)

Shiō Fukuda 福田 師王
Personal information
- Full name: Shiō Fukuda
- Date of birth: 8 April 2004 (age 22)
- Place of birth: Kanoya, Kagoshima, Japan
- Height: 1.78 m (5 ft 10 in)
- Position: Forward

Team information
- Current team: Karlsruher SC
- Number: 13

Youth career
- –2016: Takayama FC
- 2017–2019: Kamimura Gakuen Middle School
- 2020–2022: Kamimura Gakuen High School

Senior career*
Years	Team	Apps	(Gls)
2023–2024	Borussia Mönchengladbach II	36	(11)
2024–2026	Borussia Mönchengladbach	11	(1)
2025–2026	→ Karlsruher SC (loan)	20	(6)
2026–	Karlsruher SC	0	(0)

International career
2020	Japan U16		
2020–2021	Japan U17		
2021–2023	Japan U18		
2023	Japan U20	3	(0)
2023	Japan U22	1	(1)
2026–	Japan	1	(1)
- * Club domestic league appearances and goals as of 17 November 2026

Shiō Fukuda (福田 師王, Fukuda Shiō; born 8 April 2004) is a Japanese professional footballer who plays as a forward for 2. Bundesliga club Karlsruher SC and the Japan national team.

== Club career ==
Fukuda was born in Kanoya City, Kagoshima Prefecture, and started his footballing career with Takayama FC. He enrolled at the Kamimura Gakuen High School, and continued to play football for the school team. He was noted for his performances at the 2021 All Japan High School Soccer Tournament, where he was named as one of the best forwards. He scored one goal and got one assist in a 3–2 loss as Kamimura Gakuen were knocked out by Teikyo Nagaoka High School in the second round.

A noted goal-scorer, Fukuda regularly finished as one of the top scorers in each of the tournaments he played in. Following these good performances for the Kamimura Gakuen High School football team, Fukuda was included in The Guardian's "Next Generation" list for 2021.

In September 2021, Fukuda trained with J1 League side Kashima Antlers.

On 27 October 2022, Fukuda was announced by Borussia Mönchengladbach as a new signing for their youth team, despite never playing for a professional club in Japan, signing for the club as a Kamimura Gakuen High School graduate. He joined the German club in January 2023, after the winter vacation period in Japan. Speaking about Fukuda, Mönchengladbach's academy director Mirko Sandmöller stated: "We are pleased that Shiō Fukuda has chosen us, even though he had numerous offers from the J1 League. He is a technically adept, agile and developable striker with great potential". In January 2024, it was announced that he would play in the top team.

On 22 August 2025, Fukuda was loaned by Karlsruher SC in 2. Bundesliga, with an option to buy.

On 11 June 2026, Karlsruher SC made the transfer permanent.

== Playing style ==
Fukuda is a right-footed centre-forward whose playing style is characterised by his movement off the ball, acceleration, agility and finishing ability. He is particularly effective at exploiting spaces behind opposing defensive lines, using well-timed runs to get into goalscoring positions. His movement is not limited to running in behind, as he also looks to find spaces between defenders and receive the ball in positions from which he can turn towards goal and shoot.

His movement inside the penalty area has been highlighted by former Borussia Mönchengladbach manager Gerardo Seoane, who praised his positional awareness, ability to make well-timed runs and dynamic movement. Fukuda has also spoken about the importance of intelligent positioning, particularly finding spaces between opposing players to receive the ball without being immediately challenged physically.

== International career ==
Fukuda has represented Japan on all youth categories up to under-19 level, selected multiple times for the national team while at Kamimura Gakuen's Middle and High School.

Participated in the 2023 FIFA U-20 World Cup as a grade skipping, and on 18 November 2023, at the age of 19, he scored a goal against the Argentina national under-22 football team.

Fukuda was one of the players who were called up with the Japan national team by head coach Hajime Moriyasu for to the Mizuho Blue Challenge - The Kallang Football Series Singapore against Brazil and Paraguay on 14 and 17 November 2026, respectively.

== Career statistics ==
=== Club ===
As of match played 17 May 2026

Appearances and goals by club, season and competition
Club	Season	League			National cup		League cup		Other		Total	
Club	Season	Division	Apps	Goals	Apps	Goals	Apps	Goals	Apps	Goals	Apps	Goals
Borussia Mönchengladbach II	2023–24	Regionalliga West	21	7	–		–		–		21	7
Borussia Mönchengladbach	2023–24	Bundesliga	5	0	0	0	–		0	0	5	0
Borussia Mönchengladbach	2024–25	Bundesliga	6	1	0	0	–		–		6	1
Borussia Mönchengladbach	Total		11	1	0	0	–		0	0	11	1
Karlsruher SC (loan)	2025–26	2. Bundesliga	20	6	1	0	–		–		21	6
Karlsruher SC	2026–27	2. Bundesliga	0	0	0	0	–		–		0	0
Total			52	14	1	0	0	0	0	0	53	14

=== International goals ===
No.	Date	Venue	Opponent	Score	Result	Competition
1	17 November 2026	National Stadium, Kallang, Singapore	Paraguay	1–2	1–2	2026 Mizuho Blue Challenge
