= Nathan Ngoumou =

Cameroonian footballer (born 2000)

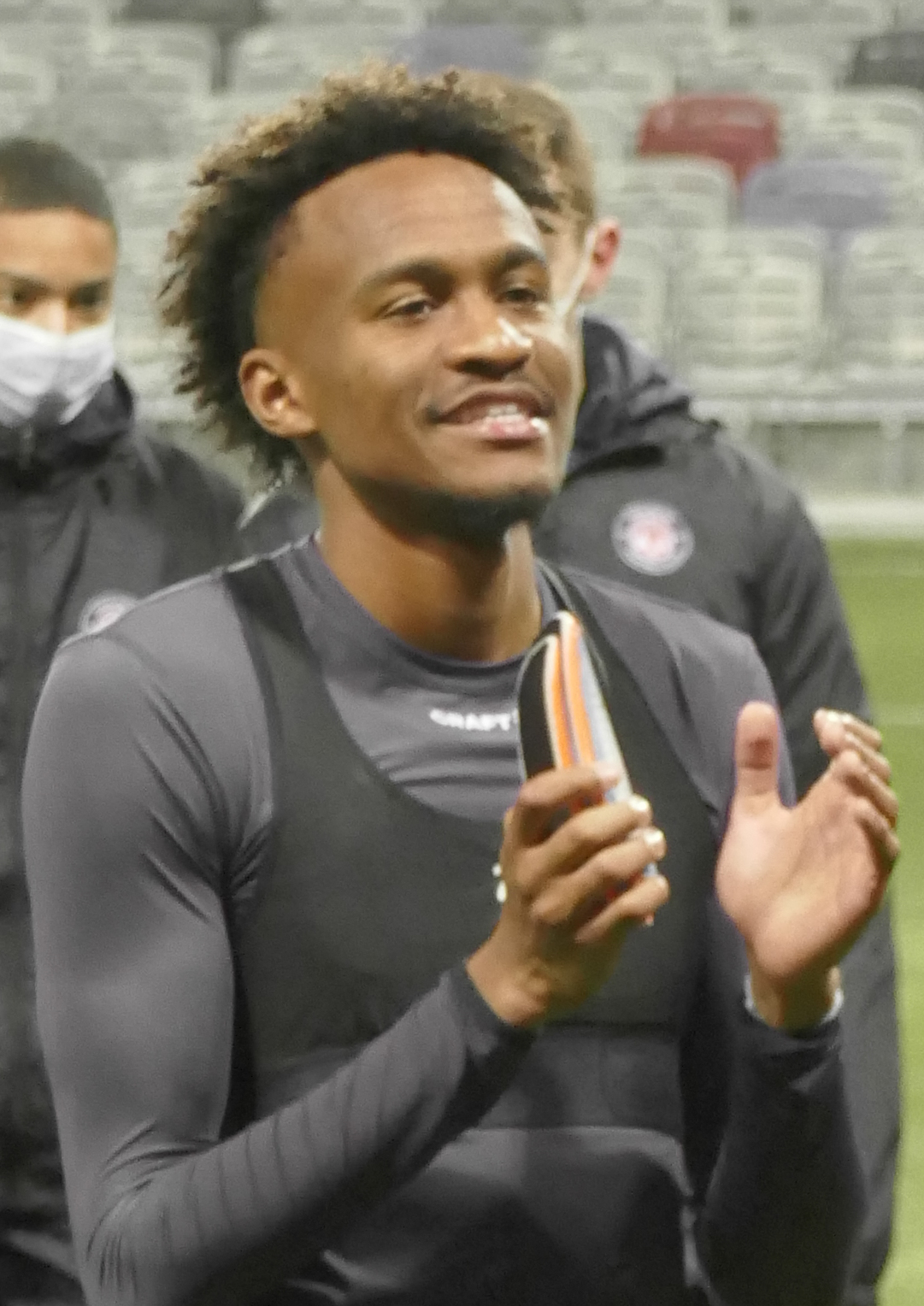
- Ngoumou training with Toulouse in 2022

Personal information
- Full name: Nathan N’Goumou Minpole
- Date of birth: 14 March 2000 (age 26)
- Place of birth: Toulouse, France
- Height: 1.82 m (6 ft 0 in)
- Positions: Winger; attacking midfielder

Team information
- Current team: Nice
- Number: 29

Youth career
- 2006–2019: Toulouse

Senior career*
Years	Team	Apps	(Gls)
2018–2020	Toulouse II	35	(8)
2019–2022	Toulouse	47	(10)
2022–2026	Borussia Mönchengladbach	71	(8)
2026–	Nice	5	(0)

International career^{‡}
2019	France U19	5	(1)
2021–2022	France U21	4	(0)
2025–	Cameroon	2	(0)
- * Club domestic league appearances and goals as of 20 September 2026 ‡ National team caps and goals as of 23:24, 25 March 2025 (UTC)

Nathan N'Goumou Minpole (born 14 March 2000) is a professional footballer who plays as a winger or attacking midfielder for Ligue 1 club Nice. Born in France, he plays for the Cameroon national team.

== Club career ==
=== Toulouse ===
A youth product of Toulouse, Ngoumou signed his first professional contract with his boyhood club in November 2018. He made his professional debut for Toulouse in a 2–1 Ligue 1 loss to Dijon on 24 May 2019.

=== Borussia Mönchengladbach ===
On 30 August 2022, Ngoumou signed a five-year contract with Borussia Mönchengladbach in Germany.

=== Nice ===
On 17 August 2026, Ngoumou joined Ligue 1 side Nice on a two-year contract.

== International career ==
Born in France, Ngoumou is of Cameroonian and Gabonese descent. On 5 February 2019, he was called up to represent the France U19s.

On 7 March 2025, Ngoumou's request to switch allegiance to Cameroon was approved by FIFA.

Ngoumou made his debut for Cameroon national team on 19 March 2025 in a World Cup qualifier 0–0 draw against Eswatini, substituting Jackson Tchatchoua in the 78th minute.

== Personal life ==
Ngoumou's is the cousin of the Cameroonian international footballer Achille Emaná, and his grandfather Clément Ebozo'o Eya'a was the second Gabonese footballer to play in the Division 1 in the 1960s. He also holds Cameroonian citizenship.

== Career statistics ==
=== Club ===
As of match played 20 September 2026

Appearances and goals by club, season and competition
Club	Season	League			National cup		League cup		Other		Total	
Club	Season	Division	Apps	Goals	Apps	Goals	Apps	Goals	Apps	Goals	Apps	Goals
Toulouse II	2017–18	Championnat National 3	2	0	—		—		—		2	0
Toulouse II	2018–19	Championnat National 3	18	4	—		—		—		18	4
Toulouse II	2019–20	Championnat National 3	14	4	—		—		—		14	4
Toulouse II	2020–21	Championnat National 3	1	0	—		—		—		1	0
Toulouse II	Total		35	8	—		—		—		35	8
Toulouse	2018–19	Ligue 1	1	0	0	0	0	0	—		1	0
Toulouse	2019–20	Ligue 1	1	0	1	0	2	0	—		4	0
Toulouse	2020–21	Ligue 2	9	2	4	1	—		3 (Note: Appearances in Ligue 1 relegation/promotion play-offs)	0	16	3
Toulouse	2021–22	Ligue 2	35	8	2	0	—		—		37	8
Toulouse	2022–23	Ligue 1	1	0	—		—		—		1	0
Toulouse	Total		47	10	7	1	2	0	3	0	59	11
Borussia Mönchengladbach	2022–23	Bundesliga	20	1	1	0	—		—		21	1
Borussia Mönchengladbach	2023–24	Bundesliga	32	5	4	1	—		—		36	6
Borussia Mönchengladbach	2024–25	Bundesliga	19	2	2	0	—		—		21	2
Borussia Mönchengladbach	Total		71	8	7	1	—		—		78	9
Nice	2026–27	Ligue 1	5	0	0	0	—		—		5	0
Career total			158	26	14	2	2	0	3	0	177	28

=== International ===
As of match played 25 March 2025

Appearances and goals by national team and year
National team	Year	Apps	Goals
Cameroon	2025	2	0
Total		2	0

== Honours ==
Toulouse

- Ligue 2: 2021–22

Individual

- UNFP Ligue 2 Team of the Year: 2021–22
