= Rocco Reitz =

German footballer (born 2002)

Personal information
- Date of birth: 29 May 2002 (age 24)
- Place of birth: Duisburg, Germany
- Height: 1.76 m (5 ft 9 in)
- Position: Defensive midfielder

Team information
- Current team: RB Leipzig
- Number: 20

Youth career
- 2009–2020: Borussia Mönchengladbach

Senior career*
Years	Team	Apps	(Gls)
2020–2026	Borussia Mönchengladbach	95	(8)
2020–2023	Borussia Mönchengladbach II	11	(0)
2021–2022	→ Sint-Truiden (loan)	23	(2)
2023	→ Sint-Truiden (loan)	12	(1)
2026–	RB Leipzig	2	(1)

International career^{‡}
2017	Germany U16	1	(0)
2023–2025	Germany U21	17	(2)
Medal record
Men's football
Representing Germany
UEFA European Under-21 Championship
Runner-up	2025 Slovakia
- * Club domestic league appearances and goals as of 31 October 2026 ‡ National team caps and goals as of 10:15, 29 June 2025 (UTC)

Rocco Reitz (German pronunciation: [ˈʁɔko ʁaɪ̯ts]; born 29 May 2002) is a German professional footballer who plays as a defensive midfielder for Bundesliga club RB Leipzig.

== Club career ==
Reitz made his professional debut for Borussia Mönchengladbach in the Bundesliga on 24 October 2020, starting in the away match against Mainz 05 which ended in a 3–2 victory. In August 2021, he joined Belgian side Sint-Truiden on loan for the 2021–22 season.

On 17 January 2023, Reitz returned to Sint-Truiden in Belgium for a second loan, until the end of the 2022–23 season. Later that year, on 10 November, Reitz scored his first Bundesliga goal for Borussia Mönchengladbach in a 4–0 win against VfL Wolfsburg.

On 16 March 2026, Reitz agreed to a move to RB Leipzig for the 2026–27 season, signing a deal until 2031.

== International career ==
Reitz represented Germany at youth international level. In May 2024, he trained with the senior national team prior to the UEFA Euro 2024, but was not considered for the final tournament.

== Career statistics ==
As of match played 31 October 2026

Appearances and goals by club, season and competition
Club	Season	League			National cup (Note: Includes DFB-Pokal, Belgian Cup)		Europe		Total	
Club	Season	Division	Apps	Goals	Apps	Goals	Apps	Goals	Apps	Goals
Borussia Mönchengladbach	2020–21	Bundesliga	2	0	0	0	0	0	2	0
Borussia Mönchengladbach	2022–23	Bundesliga	1	0	1	0	—		2	0
Borussia Mönchengladbach	2023–24	Bundesliga	34	6	3	0	—		37	6
Borussia Mönchengladbach	2024–25	Bundesliga	27	2	1	0	—		28	2
Borussia Mönchengladbach	2025–26	Bundesliga	31	0	2	0	—		33	0
Borussia Mönchengladbach	Total		95	8	7	0	0	0	102	8
Borussia Mönchengladbach II	2020–21	Regionalliga West	6	0	—		—		6	0
Borussia Mönchengladbach II	2022–23	Regionalliga West	5	0	—		—		5	0
Borussia Mönchengladbach II	Total		11	0	—		—		11	0
Sint-Truiden (loan)	2021–22	Belgian Pro League	23	2	1	0	—		24	2
Sint-Truiden (loan)	2022–23	Belgian Pro League	12	1	—		—		12	1
RB Leipzig	2026–27	Bundesliga	2	1	2	0	0	0	4	1
Career total			143	12	10	0	0	0	153	12

== Honours ==
Germany U21

- UEFA European Under-21 Championship runner-up: 2025
