= Grant-Leon Ranos =

Armenian footballer (born 2003)

Grant-Leon Ranos Հրանտ-Լեոն Ռանոս
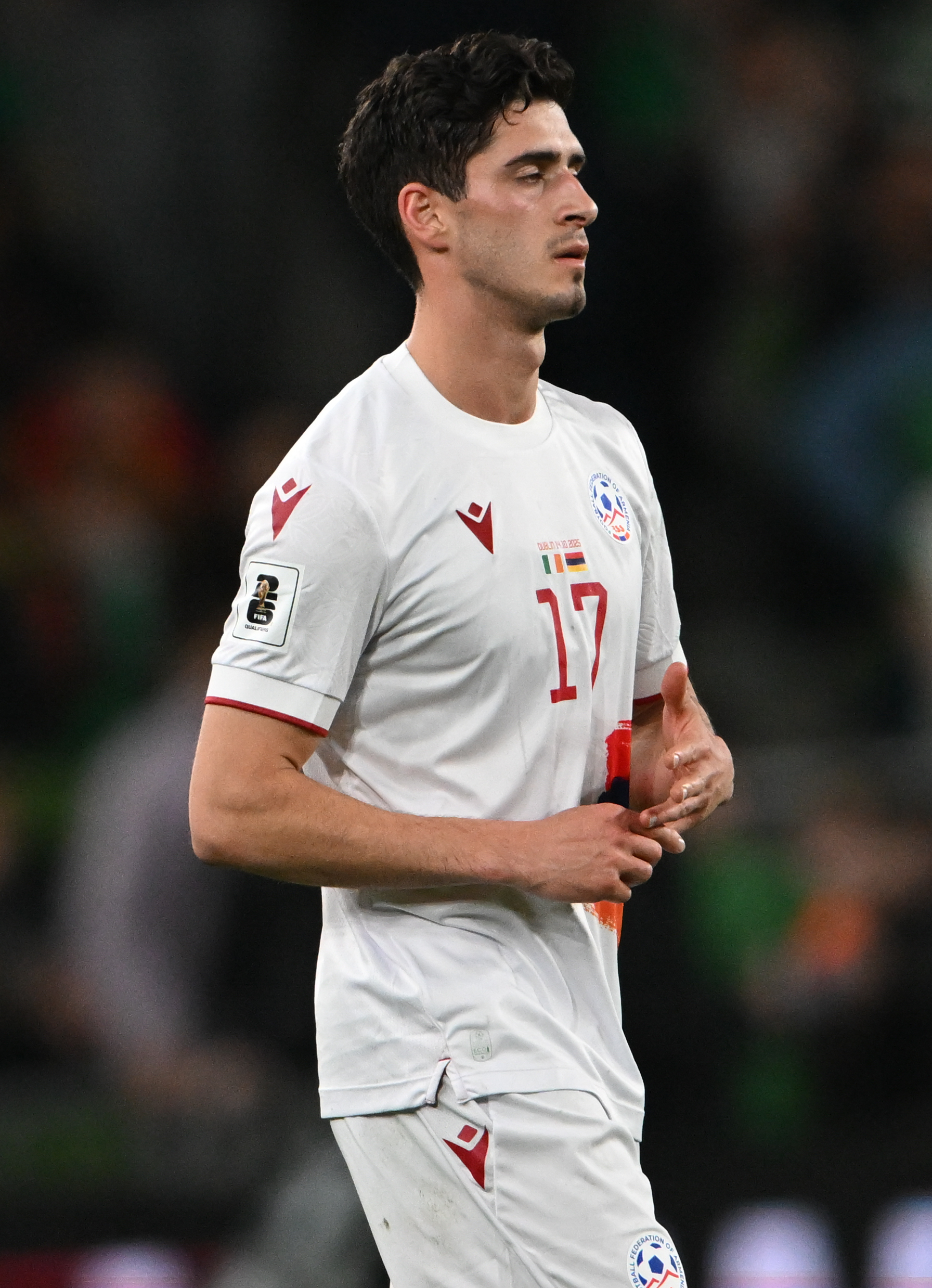
- Ranos playing for Armenia in 2025

Personal information
- Date of birth: 20 July 2003 (age 23)
- Place of birth: Gehrden, Germany
- Height: 1.80 m (5 ft 11 in)
- Positions: Forward; winger

Team information
- Current team: Tenerife
- Number: 22

Youth career
- –2012: FC Beningsen
- 2012–2017: Hannover 96
- 2017–2018: Borussia Dortmund
- 2018–2022: Bayern Munich

Senior career*
Years	Team	Apps	(Gls)
2022–2023	Bayern Munich II	45	(23)
2023–2026	Borussia Mönchengladbach II	17	(8)
2023–2026	Borussia Mönchengladbach	19	(1)
2025	→ 1. FC Kaiserslautern (loan)	5	(0)
2026	→ Eintracht Braunschweig (loan)	11	(0)
2026–	Tenerife	3	(3)

International career^{‡}
2023–	Armenia	28	(5)
- * Club domestic league appearances and goals as of 5 October 2026 ‡ National team caps and goals as of 15 November 2026

Grant-Leon Ranos (Armenian: Հրանտ-Լեոն Ռանոս; born 20 July 2003) is a professional footballer who plays as a forward for Segunda División club Tenerife. Born in Germany, he plays for the Armenia national team.

== Personal life ==
Ranos was born in Gehrden, Germany. His father is from Armenia. Several Armenia media outlets have reported that his original last name is Yeranosyan.

== Club career ==
As a youth player, Ranos joined the youth academy of Borussia Dortmund, moving from the youth academy of Hannover 96. After that, he joined the Bayern Munich under–19 team. In 2022, he was promoted to Bayern Munich II where he became a regular starter.

On 24 May 2023, Ranos signed a four-year contract with Bundesliga club Borussia Mönchengladbach that will run until 2027, set to join on a free transfer on 1 July 2023. On 22 January 2025, he moved to 1. FC Kaiserslautern in 2. Bundesliga on loan.

On 2 February 2026, Ranos returned to 2. Bundesliga and joined Eintracht Braunschweig on loan. On 17 July, he moved abroad for the first time in his career, after signing a two-year contract with Segunda División side Tenerife.

== International career ==
Born in Germany, Ranos acquired Armenian citizenship in 2023 and chose to represent Armenia internationally. In March of the same year, he received his first call-up to the Armenian senior national team for a UEFA Euro 2024 qualifying match against Turkey and a friendly match against Cyprus, respectively.

He then won his first cap for Armenia by starting the latter game, on 28 March 2023 in the process, Ranos also scored his first two international goals, as the friendly eventually ended in a 2–2 draw. Ranos' first competitive start was a UEFA Euro 2024 qualifying match versus Wales on 16 June 2023. Ranos scored two goals to help Armenia to a 4–2 victory.

On 22 March 2025, coach John van 't Schip removed him from the Armenian national team. The decision came after the player reportedly pressured the coach to include him in the lineup for the match against Georgia in Tbilisi. The coach became upset over the player's insistence, leading to his removal from the squad. It was later reported that the player refused to remain with the national team and declared "firewall forever." He returned to the national team after van 't Schip was replaced by Yeghishe Melikyan in August 2025.

== Career statistics ==
=== Club ===
As of match played 18 November 2026

Appearances and goals by club, season and competition
Club	Season	League			National cup		Other		Total	
Club	Season	Division	Apps	Goals	Apps	Goals	Apps	Goals	Apps	Goals
Bayern Munich II	2021–22	Regionalliga Bayern	9	3	—		0	0	9	3
Bayern Munich II	2022–23	Regionalliga Bayern	36	20	—		0	0	36	20
Bayern Munich II	Total		45	23	—		0	0	45	23
Borussia Mönchengladbach	2023–24	Bundesliga	9	0	1	1	—		10	1
Borussia Mönchengladbach	2024–25	Bundesliga	2	0	0	0	—		2	0
Borussia Mönchengladbach	2025–26	Bundesliga	8	1	1	0	—		9	1
Borussia Mönchengladbach	Total		19	1	2	1	—		21	2
Borussia Mönchengladbach II	2023–24	Regionalliga West	8	3	—		—		8	3
1. FC Kaiserslautern (loan)	2024–25	2. Bundesliga	5	0	—		—		5	0
Eintracht Braunschweig (loan)	2025–26	2. Bundesliga	11	0	—		—		11	0
Tenerife	2026–27	Segunda División	2	1	1	2	0	0	2	1
Career total			90	28	3	3	0	0	93	31

=== International ===
As of match played 15 November 2026

Appearances and goals by national team and year
National team	Year	Apps	Goals
Armenia	2023	9	4
Armenia	2024	8	0
Armenia	2025	6	1
Armenia	2026	5	0
Total		28	5

Scores and results list Armenia's goal tally first, score column indicates score after each Ranos goal.

List of international goals scored by Grant-Leon Ranos
No.	Date	Venue	Opponent	Score	Result	Competition
1	28 March 2023	Vazgen Sargsyan Republican Stadium, Yerevan, Armenia	Cyprus	1–1	2–2	Friendly
2	28 March 2023	Vazgen Sargsyan Republican Stadium, Yerevan, Armenia	Cyprus	2–1	2–2	Friendly
3	16 June 2023	Cardiff City Stadium, Cardiff, Wales	Wales	2–1	4–2	UEFA Euro 2024 qualification
4	16 June 2023	Cardiff City Stadium, Cardiff, Wales	Wales	3–1	4–2	UEFA Euro 2024 qualification
5	9 September 2025	Vazgen Sargsyan Republican Stadium, Yerevan, Armenia	Republic of Ireland	2–0	2–1	2026 FIFA World Cup qualification
