= Moritz Nicolas =

German footballer (born 1997)

Personal information
- Full name: Moritz Nicolas
- Date of birth: 21 October 1997 (age 29)
- Place of birth: Gladbeck, Germany
- Height: 1.93 m (6 ft 4 in)
- Position: Goalkeeper

Team information
- Current team: Borussia Mönchengladbach
- Number: 1

Youth career
- Adler Ellinghorst
- SV Zweckel
- –2012: VfB Hüls
- 2012–2015: Rot-Weiss Essen
- 2015–2016: Borussia Mönchengladbach

Senior career*
Years	Team	Apps	(Gls)
2015–2019	Borussia Mönchengladbach II	75	(0)
2016–	Borussia Mönchengladbach	87	(0)
2019–2020	→ Union Berlin (loan)	1	(0)
2020–2021	→ VfL Osnabrück (loan)	1	(0)
2021–2022	→ Viktoria Köln (loan)	30	(0)
2022–2023	→ Roda JC (loan)	30	(0)

International career
2015	Germany U19	1	(0)
2016–2017	Germany U20	2	(0)
2018	Germany U21	1	(0)
- * Club domestic league appearances and goals as of 22:30, 23 October 2026 (UTC)

Moritz Nicolas (born 21 October 1997) is a German professional footballer who plays as a goalkeeper for Bundesliga club Borussia Mönchengladbach.

== Career ==
=== Early years ===
Nicolas was born in Gladbeck, North Rhine-Westphalia, Germany, and began playing football for Adler Ellinghorst as an outfield player, before switching to goalkeeper during indoor practice. He continued his youth career with SV Zweckel and VfB Hüls, before joining Rot-Weiss Essen's academy in 2012.

=== Borussia Mönchengladbach ===
On 1 July 2015, Nicolas signed with Borussia Mönchengladbach, where he made his debut for the reserve team in the Regionalliga West on 31 October 2015 in a 3–1 home defeat to Viktoria Köln. During summer training camp in 2016, Nicolas was included in the first team's pre-season preparations, while still being a part of the reserves as well as Mönchengladbach's under-19 side. At the end of the 2018–19 campaign, he had made 75 appearances for the reserves in the Regionalliga West.

==== Union Berlin (loan) ====
Nicolas joined Bundesliga club Union Berlin on a two-year loan deal on 31 May 2019. He made his professional debut for Union in the Bundesliga on 20 June 2020, starting in the 4–0 away loss to 1899 Hoffenheim. His loan was cut short on 15 August 2020 after making only one appearance for the Berlin side.

==== VfL Osnabrück (loan) ====
The same day, Nicolas joined 2. Bundesliga club VfL Osnabrück on a season-long loan. On 28 February 2021, he made his debut for the club, starting in place of the benched Philipp Kühn in a 3–0 league loss to SV Sandhausen. After the game, Nicolas was demoted to backup again, and he would only go on to make the one appearance for Osnabrück before his loan expired.

==== Viktoria Köln (loan) ====
On 15 July 2021, he moved to 3. Liga club FC Viktoria Köln on loan. He made his debut on the first matchday of the 2021–22 campaign, in a 2–1 loss to recently promoted Viktoria Berlin. He remained a starter throughout the season, making 34 total appearances for Viktoria as they suffered relegation to the Regionalliga at the end of the campaign.

==== Roda JC (loan) ====
On 17 August 2022, Nicolas joined Eerste Divisie club Roda JC on a season-long loan. He made his debut on 5 September 2022, starting in a 1–1 draw in the derby against MVV. He remained the starter in goal afterwards in place of Rody de Boer, returning to Mönchengladbach at the end of the season with 30 league appearances for Roda.

==== Return to Borussia Mönchengladbach ====
Nicolas returned to Borussia Mönchengladbach ahead of the 2023–24 season and, following an injury to first-choice goalkeeper Jonas Omlin, was named in the starting lineup against Bayern Munich on 2 September 2023, making his Bundesliga debut. In March 2024, he signed a contract extension until June 2029. After Omlin suffered another injury in September 2024, Nicolas regained his place in the starting lineup for an away match against Eintracht Frankfurt and impressed with a series of strong performances. As a result, head coach Gerardo Seoane named him the club's first-choice goalkeeper in November 2024. In the 2025–26 season, Nicolas recorded a league-high 143 saves, the most of any goalkeeper in the Bundesliga.

== Career statistics ==
As of match played 23 October 2026

Appearances and goals by club, season and competition
Club	Season	League			National cup		Other		Total	
Club	Season	Division	Apps	Goals	Apps	Goals	Apps	Goals	Apps	Goals
Borussia Mönchengladbach II	2015–16	Regionalliga West	10	0	—		—		10	0
Borussia Mönchengladbach II	2016–17	Regionalliga West	12	0	—		—		12	0
Borussia Mönchengladbach II	2017–18	Regionalliga West	26	0	—		—		26	0
Borussia Mönchengladbach II	2018–19	Regionalliga West	27	0	—		—		27	0
Borussia Mönchengladbach II	Total		75	0	—		—		75	0
Borussia Mönchengladbach	2017–18	Bundesliga	0	0	0	0	—		0	0
Borussia Mönchengladbach	2018–19	Bundesliga	0	0	0	0	—		0	0
Borussia Mönchengladbach	2022–23	Bundesliga	0	0	1	0	—		1	0
Borussia Mönchengladbach	2023–24	Bundesliga	27	0	3	0	—		30	0
Borussia Mönchengladbach	2024–25	Bundesliga	19	0	1	0	—		20	0
Borussia Mönchengladbach	2025–26	Bundesliga	34	0	2	0	—		36	0
Borussia Mönchengladbach	2026–27	Bundesliga	7	0	1	0	—		8	0
Borussia Mönchengladbach	Total		87	0	8	0	—		95	0
Union Berlin (loan)	2019–20	Bundesliga	1	0	0	0	—		1	0
VfL Osnabrück (loan)	2020–21	2. Bundesliga	1	0	0	0	0	0	1	0
Viktoria Köln (loan)	2021–22	3. Liga	31	0	1	0	2 (Note: Appearances in the Middle Rhine Cup)	0	34	0
Roda JC (loan)	2022–23	Eerste Divisie	30	0	0	0	—		30	0
Career total			225	0	9	0	2	0	236	0
