= Jan Olschowsky =

German footballer (born 2001)

Personal information
- Full name: Jan Jakob Olschowsky
- Date of birth: 18 November 2001 (age 24)
- Place of birth: Neuss, Germany
- Height: 1.84 m (6 ft 0 in)
- Position: Goalkeeper

Team information
- Current team: Borussia Mönchengladbach
- Number: 23

Youth career
- 2008–2009: SV Glehn
- 2009–2020: Borussia Mönchengladbach

Senior career*
Years	Team	Apps	(Gls)
2018–	Borussia Mönchengladbach II	86	(0)
2020–	Borussia Mönchengladbach	4	(0)
2025–2026	→ Alemannia Aachen (loan)	37	(0)

International career^{‡}
2018	Germany U18	1	(0)
2018	Germany U19	1	(0)
2018	Germany U20	1	(0)
- * Club domestic league appearances and goals as of 24 January 2026 ‡ National team caps and goals as of 07:22, 12 November 2022 (UTC)

Jan Jakob Olschowsky (born 18 November 2001) is a German professional footballer who plays as a goalkeeper for Bundesliga club Borussia Mönchengladbach. He played for SV Glehn from 2008 to 2009 and has played for Borussia Mönchengladbach since 2009.

== Club career ==
Olschowsky began his football career in 2008 and in the youth of SV Glehn in the Glehn district of Korschenbroich. In July 2009 he moved to Borussia Mönchengladbach and went through all the youth teams at the club. He played 29 games for the Mönchengladbach U17 team in the Under 17 Bundesliga and 27 games for the Mönchengladbach U19 selection in the Under 19 Bundesliga. On 13 October 2018 he made his debut for Borussia Mönchengladbach II in a 2–1 win over SV 19 Straelen at the age of 16, as the youngest goalkeeper in the Regionalliga West.

In July 2020, Olschowsky signed a professional contract with Borussia Mönchengladbach that runs until 30 June 2023. On 27 September 2022 he made his debut in the first-team matchday squad. With both first-choice goalkeeper Yann Sommer and his substitute Tobias Sippel being unavailable due to injury, Olschowsky made his Bundesliga debut against VfL Bochum on 8 November 2022. Mönchengladbach lost the match by 2–1 and he was voted by fans as the club's player of the match.

On 9 January 2025, Olschowsky moved on loan to Alemannia Aachen in 3. Liga until the end of the season. On 30 June 2025, the loan was extended for the 2025–26 season. The loan was terminated early by the request of Olschowsky and Borussia on 27 January 2026.

== International career ==
Olschowsky has played for the German junior national teams at the U18, U19 and U20 levels.

== Career statistics ==
As of match played 17 January 2026

Appearances and goals by club, season and competition
Club	Season	League			National cup		Other		Total	
Club	Season	Division	Apps	Goals	Apps	Goals	Apps	Goals	Apps	Goals
Borussia Mönchengladbach II	2018–19	Regionalliga West	2	0	—		—		2	0
Borussia Mönchengladbach II	2019–20	Regionalliga West	18	0	—		—		18	0
Borussia Mönchengladbach II	2020–21	Regionalliga West	26	0	—		—		26	0
Borussia Mönchengladbach II	2021–22	Regionalliga West	16	0	—		—		16	0
Borussia Mönchengladbach II	2022–23	Regionalliga West	12	0	—		—		12	0
Borussia Mönchengladbach II	2023–24	Regionalliga West	10	0	—		—		10	0
Borussia Mönchengladbach II	2024–25	Regionalliga West	2	0	—		—		2	0
Borussia Mönchengladbach II	Total		86	0	—		—		86	0
Borussia Mönchengladbach	2022–23	Bundesliga	4	0	0	0	—		4	0
Borussia Mönchengladbach	2023–24	Bundesliga	0	0	0	0	—		0	0
Borussia Mönchengladbach	2025–26	Bundesliga	0	0	—		—		0	0
Borussia Mönchengladbach	2026–27	Bundesliga	0	0	0	0	—		0	0
Borussia Mönchengladbach	Total		4	0	0	0	—		4	0
Alemannia Aachen (loan)	2024–25	3. Liga	17	0	—		—		17	0
Alemannia Aachen (loan)	2025–26	3. Liga	20	0	—		—		20	0
Alemannia Aachen (loan)	Total		37	0	—		—		37	0
Career total			127	0	0	0	0	0	127	0
