= Famana Quizera =

Bissau-Guinean footballer

Personal information
- Date of birth: 25 April 2002 (age 24)
- Place of birth: Bissau, Guinea-Bissau
- Height: 1.72 m (5 ft 8 in)
- Positions: Attacking midfielder; winger

Team information
- Current team: União de Leiria
- Number: 7

Youth career
- –2018: Benfica
- 2018–2020: Borussia Mönchengladbach

Senior career*
Years	Team	Apps	(Gls)
2020–2022	Borussia Mönchengladbach	0	(0)
2020–2021	Borussia Mönchengladbach II	30	(4)
2021–2022	→ Académico de Viseu (loan)	24	(5)
2022–2025	Académico de Viseu	78	(8)
2025–	União de Leiria	5	(0)

International career^{‡}
2023–	Guinea-Bissau	1	(0)
- * Club domestic league appearances and goals as of 19 June 2026 ‡ National team caps and goals as of 22:08, 11 September 2023 (UTC)

Famana Quizera (born 25 April 2002) is a Bissau-Guinean professional footballer who plays as an attacking midfielder or winger for Liga Portugal 2 club União de Leiria and the Guinea-Bissau national team.

== Career ==
In 2021, Quizera was sent on loan to Portuguese club Académico de Viseu in the Liga Portugal 2, from Borussia Mönchengladbach in the German Bundesliga. On 13 September 2021, he debuted for Académico de Viseu during a 2–2 draw against Farense.

On 21 July 2022, Quizera permanently signed for Académico de Viseu in the Liga Portugal 2 for an undisclosed fee.

On 18 August 2025, Quizera moved to União de Leiria in the same league on a three-season deal.

== International career ==
Quizera was called up to the Guinea-Bissau national team for a set of 2023 Africa Cup of Nations qualification matches in September 2023.

== Honours ==
Individual

- Liga Portugal 2 Midfielder of the Month: February 2023
