= Mamadou Doucouré =

Footballer (born 1998)

Personal information
- Full name: Mamadou Doucouré
- Date of birth: 21 May 1998 (age 28)
- Place of birth: Dakar, Senegal
- Height: 1.83 m (6 ft 0 in)
- Position: Defender

Youth career
- 2006–2011: Paris
- 2011–2015: Paris Saint-Germain

Senior career*
Years	Team	Apps	(Gls)
2015–2016	Paris Saint-Germain B	3	(0)
2016–2024	Borussia Mönchengladbach	2	(0)
2018–2024	Borussia Mönchengladbach II	29	(0)

International career^{‡}
2013–2014	France U16	6	(0)
2014–2015	France U17	15	(1)
2015–2016	France U18	11	(1)
- * Club domestic league appearances and goals as of 18 May 2024 ‡ National team caps and goals as of 15:37, 31 May 2020 (UTC)

Mamadou Doucouré (born 21 May 1998) is a professional footballer who plays as a defender. Born in Senegal, Doucouré has represented France internationally at youth levels.

== Club career ==
Doucouré joined Borussia Mönchengladbach from Paris Saint-Germain in 2016. Having failed to make an appearance due to numerous injuries over his first four seasons at the club, he finally made his professional debut for Mönchengladbach in the Bundesliga on 31 May 2020. He came on as a 90th minute substitute for Florian Neuhaus in the home match against Union Berlin, which finished as a 4–1 win. Doucouré's time at Borussia Mönchengladbach was overshadowed by injuries, having only made 2 league appearances over 8 years at the club.

== Personal life ==
Doucouré was born in Dakar, Senegal. He has represented France at their under-16, under-17, and under-18 levels.

== Honours ==
France U17

- UEFA European Under-17 Championship: 2015
