= 2018–19 1. FC Union Berlin season =

1. FC Union Berlin
2018–19 season
- President: Dirk Zingler
- Manager: Urs Fischer
- Stadium: Stadion An der Alten Försterei
- 2. Bundesliga: 3rd (promoted via play-offs)
- DFB-Pokal: Second round
Home colours	Away colours
- All statistics correct as of 27 May 2019.

The 2018–19 1. FC Union Berlin season is the 53rd season in the football club's history and 9th consecutive season in the second division of German football, the 2. Bundesliga and 13th overall. In addition to the domestic league, 1. FC Union Berlin also are participating in this season's edition of the domestic cup, the DFB-Pokal. This is the 53rd season for 1. FC Union Berlin in the Stadion An der Alten Försterei, located in Köpenick, Berlin, Germany. The season covers a period from 1 July 2018 to 30 June 2019.

== Season review ==
=== Pre-season ===
After a disappointing season in which Union was only able to avoid relegation on the 33rd matchday, the team started into the season with a brand new look. Starting at the front with a new manager Urs Fischer, who has won numerous titles in the Swiss Super League with FC Basel; this was only the beginning of a new Union squad that saw drastic changes from the season before. Union would start the new campaign without fan favorite Steven Skrzybski but added key players such as Rafal Gikiewicz and Sebastian Andersson, both of whom would go on to feature in every fixture.

=== 2. Bundesliga first half (matchday 1–17) ===
Union Berlin started their 13th ever 2. Bundesliga season with a 1–0 win at home to start the campaign, courtesy of a late free kick goal by former captain Felix Kroos. A 1–1 draw the next week against 1. FC Köln in Cologne, was already a reason for optimism for the Köpenick based club, as Köln were predicted by many to promote back into the Bundesliga. This draw would be followed up with many similar score lines, as Union managed a staggering 10 draws in just the first half of the season, along with 7 wins. Two key fixtures were a matchday nine 1–1 draw against 1. FC Heidenheim where goalkeeper Gikiewicz saved Union with a headed goal from a corner kick in the 94th minute. The second a 2–2 away draw against Hamburger SV, who after relegating for the first time in their history the season before, were favorites to go back up. During that first half of the season, Union was also drawn against Borussia Dortmund in the 2nd round of the DFB Pokal after 90 minutes, coming close to beating the Bundesliga club and creating a massive upset in Dortmund. Only to be stymied by a Marco Reus penalty kick goal in the final moments of the game. This impressive early-season run had Die Eisernen remaining undefeated in their first 17 games in 3rd place, within striking distance of promotion heading into the winter break to the surprise of many.

=== 2. Bundesliga second half (matchday 18–34) ===
In the first matchday of the 2nd half of the season, Union fans were met with a worrying result, losing the first game back in a 0–3 collapse to midtable Erzgebirge Aue. However, things quickly got back up on track with a win against eventual champions Köln in Berlin 2–0. Union maintained their incredible results while playing at home the rest of the campaign, only losing one game out of their 17 at home all season against SC Paderborn, who had emerged as a promotion candidate as well. On matchday 31 a 2–0 win against Hamburger SV in the near-impenetrable fortress that was the Stadion An der Alten Försterei launched Die Eisernen back into the top three, good enough for a playoff against the 16th place Bundesliga team for a chance at promotion. The possibility to promote automatically was there on the last matchday of the season, a win against VfL Bochum was all they needed to leapfrog into 2nd. Union fought their way back from 0–2 to a 2–2, and nearly managed the victory at the last gasp. With the draw, Union finished with 57 points, and only missed 2nd place on goal differential. However, their amazing home form and ability to draw on the road was enough, as they secured a place in the Bundesliga Relegation playoffs, facing off in a two-leg series against VfB Stuttgart.

=== Relegation playoff (leg 1) ===
The first relegation playoff in club history would not be an easy task for the boys from Köpenick. The relegation playoffs heavily favor the team from the Bundesliga, with few teams managing to come out victorious from 2. Bundesliga. The first leg of the playoffs was played in Stuttgart at Mercedes-Benz Arena and couldn't have been harder on the Union fans emotionally. Stuttgart took a 1–0 lead just before halftime thanks to Christian Gentner, but 89 seconds later Suleiman Abdullahi managed to reply with an assist from Sebastian Andersson, and all was level at the break. The second half was opened quickly by VfB Stuttgart and started well for the home side as halftime substitute Mario Gomez found a goal for a quick 2–1 advantage. Union didn't give up despite the second setback, just as they hadn’t on the road all season. They came back strong, played out their chances and in the 68th minute Marvin Friedrich tied the game up at 2–2 from a corner kick by Christopher Trimmel. Friedrich had featured in every single game during the season for Union, but this was the first time finding the back of the net in any. After that goal it was Union who looked the more likely side to win, as Sebastian Andersson created two great chances that very nearly forced the improbable victory. Union fans we’re pleased with the 2–2 draw, since the away goals rule was in effect for these playoffs and Stuttgart had to come to Berlin and manage to find a win that had eluded virtually all visitors during the campaign.

=== Relegation playoff (leg 2) ===
Stadion An Der Alten Försterei was waiting for them, a place that Union had made a fortress during the 2018–19 season. Stuttgart would be forced to try and play attacking soccer, needing a 3 goal draw or victory to remain in Bundesliga. It was not an attractive game ripe with chances for either side, as the two teams battled in front of the crowd of over 22,000. Stuttgart thought they had the lead in the 9th minute when Dennis Aogo hit a free kick passed Gikiewicz. Somewhat controversially, it was promptly taken back by the video assistant referee, as Nicolás González had been found to have obstructed Gikiewicz's view from an offside position, thus making the goal unofficial. The rest of the game was nerve-wracking for both sides. The match stayed 0-0 into the 80th minute, a goal for either side would see their side into the Bundesliga almost certainly. As the game opened up, Abdullahi had two shots beat the VfB Stuttgart defense, only to be denied by the woodwork each time. Stuttgart came towards the goal of Union more and more, each time the stout Union defense and Gikiewicz were there to answer. Finally, Union had to survive the longest five minutes the fans of Stadion An der Alten Försterei had ever witnessed. When the final whistle came, Union Berlin has successfully promoted to the Bundesliga, for the first time in their long history. Meanwhile the 2–2 aggregate result after two draws saw VfB Stuttgart relegated on the away goals rule.

=== Aftermath ===
Following the match, fans celebrated on the pitch. This promotion marked the club's first time reaching the Bundesliga. The 56th-ever team to play in the Bundesliga since its founding, and the first-ever from East Berlin. The success in the promotion playoff cemented the 2018–19 season as the most famous ever in club history to this date, and simply a night no Union Berlin fan was ever going to forget. The following week Union paraded around the streets of Berlin and even down the Spree on a team boat, culminating in a party for players and fans alike at the Stadion An der Alten Försterei.

== Players ==
=== Squad information ===
As of 21 February 2019

Note: Flags indicate national team as defined under FIFA eligibility rules; some limited exceptions apply. Players may hold more than one non-FIFA nationality.

No.	Pos.	Nation	Player
1	GK	POL	Rafał Gikiewicz
5	DF	GER	Marvin Friedrich
6	MF	NOR	Julian Ryerson
7	MF	GER	Marcel Hartel
8	MF	GER	Joshua Mees
9	FW	GER	Sebastian Polter
10	FW	SWE	Sebastian Andersson
11	MF	GER	Akaki Gogia
12	GK	DEN	Jakob Busk
14	DF	GER	Ken Reichel
15	DF	ESP	Marc Torrejón
17	FW	POR	Carlos Mané (on loan from Sporting CP)
18	DF	GER	Nicolai Rapp
19	DF	GER	Florian Hübner

No.	Pos.	Nation	Player
20	FW	NGA	Suleiman Abdullahi (on loan from Eintracht Braunschweig)
21	MF	GER	Grischa Prömel
23	MF	GER	Felix Kroos
24	MF	GER	Manuel Schmiedebach (on loan from Hannover 96)
25	DF	GER	Christopher Lenz
27	MF	KOS	Eroll Zejnullahu
28	DF	AUT	Christopher Trimmel (Captain)
29	DF	GER	Michael Parensen
30	GK	GER	Lennart Moser
31	MF	TUR	Berkan Taz
32	MF	AUT	Robert Žulj (on loan from 1899 Hoffenheim)
33	DF	USA	Lennard Maloney
34	DF	GER	Fabian Schönheim

=== Transfers ===
==== Summer ====
In:

No.	Pos.	Nation	Player
1	GK	POL	Rafał Gikiewicz (from SC Freiburg)
6	MF	NOR	Julian Ryerson (from Viking Stavanger)
7	MF	GER	Joshua Mees (from TSG Hoffenheim)
10	FW	SWE	Sebastian Andersson (from 1.FC Kaiserslautern)
14	DF	GER	Ken Reichel (from Eintracht Braunschweig)
19	DF	GER	Florian Hübner (from Hannover 96)
20	FW	NGA	Suleiman Abdullahi (on loan from Eintracht Braunschweig)
24	MF	GER	Manuel Schmiedebach (on loan from Hannover 96)
25	DF	GER	Christopher Lenz (previously on loan to Holstein Kiel)
27	MF	KOS	Eroll Zejnullahu (previously on loan to SV Sandhausen)
32	MF	AUT	Robert Žulj (on loan from 1899 Hoffenheim)

Out:

No.	Pos.	Nation	Player
1	GK	GER	Daniel Mesenhöler (to MSV Duisburg)
4	DF	GER	Lars Dietz (on loan to Sportfreunde Lotte)
6	DF	DEN	Kristian Pedersen (to Birmingham City F.C.)
8	MF	GER	Stephan Fürstner (to Eintracht Braunschweig)
10	MF	GER	Dennis Daube (Released)
13	DF	GER	Peter Kurzweg (on loan to Würzburger Kickers)
24	FW	GER	Steven Skrzybski (to FC Schalke 04)
36	DF	GER	Cihan Kahraman (on loan to FSV Union Fürstenwalde)
37	DF	GER	Toni Leistner (Released)

==== Winter ====
In:

No.	Pos.	Nation	Player
18	DF	GER	Nicolai Rapp (from Erzgebirge Aue)
17	FW	POR	Carlos Mané (on loan from Sporting CP)

Out:

No.	Pos.	Nation	Player
3	DF	AUT	Christoph Schößwendter (Released)
17	FW	SWE	Simon Hedlund (to Brøndby IF)
18	FW	GER	Kenny Prince Redondo (to Greuther Fürth)

== Matches ==
=== Legend ===
Win Draw Loss

=== Friendly matches ===
1 July 2018 Friendly	Union Berlin	1−1	FC Carl Zeiss Jena	Berlin
14:00	Hosiner 18' (pen.)	Report	Starke 16'	Stadium: Stadion An der Alten Försterei; Attendance: 11,085; Referee: Alexander Sather (Grimma)

4 July 2018 Friendly	Chemnitzer FC	1−3	Union Berlin	Brandenburg an der Havel
18:30	Kalkutschke 83'	Report	Hedlund 48'; Redondo 49'; Friedrich 68'	Stadium: Werner-Seelenbinder-Sportstätte; Attendance: 939; Referee: Henry Müller (Cottbus)

5 July 2018 Friendly	FSV Union Fürstenwalde	1−3	Union Berlin	Fürstenwalde
18:30	Bolyki 35' (pen.)	Report	Zejnullahu 2'; Gogia 53'; Hosiner 62'	Stadium: Bonava-Arena; Attendance: 1,320; Referee: Marcel Riemer (Eisenhüttenstadt)

17 July 2018 Friendly	1. FC Union Berlin	2−1	Norwich City F.C.	Delbrück
18:00	Redondo 43'; Klose 68' (o.g.)	Report	Rhodes 58'	Stadium: Stadion Laumeskamp; Attendance: 750; Referee: Henrik Bramlage (Vechta)

21 July 2018 Friendly	Union Berlin	1−1	Girondins Bordeaux	Berlin
18:00	Andersson 3'	Report	Kounde 56'	Stadium: Stadion An der Alten Försterei; Attendance: 7,821; Referee: Henry Müller (Cottbus)

28 July 2018 Friendly	Queens Park Rangers	3−0	Union Berlin	London
14:30	Osayi-Samuel 18'; Smith 30'; Eze 59' (pk.)	Report		Stadium: Loftus Road; Attendance: 4,097; Referee: Tim Robinson (West Sussex)

14 August 2018 Friendly	Union Berlin	1−3	VSG Altglienicke	Berlin
18:00	Eidtner 46'	Report	Preiss 32'; Föster 68'; Skoda 74'	Stadium: Stadion An der Alten Försterei; Attendance: 1,428

5 September 2018 Friendly	Union Berlin	3−3	Grasshopper Club Zürich	Berlin
18:00	Taz 15', 78'; Redondo 21'	Report	Djuricin 30', 45'; Ngoy 64'	Stadium: Stadion An der Alten Försterei; Attendance: 1,512; Referee: Daniel Siebert

12 October 2018 Friendly	Union Berlin	9−1	SV Babelsberg 03	Berlin
14:00	Abdullahi 6'; Polter 21'; Mees 36'; Kroos 44'; Maloney 45'; Redondo 61'; Taz 62'; Hedlund 75'; Zulj 80'	Report	Nattermann 83'	Stadium: Fritz-Lesch-Sportplatz; Attendance: 400

15 November 2018 Friendly	Union Berlin	1−1	Dynamo Dresden	Berlin
13:30	Redondo 3'	Report	Atik 59'	Stadium: Stadion An der Alten Försterei; Attendance: closed-doors

13 January 2019 Friendly	Union Berlin	2−0	Shenzhen F.C.	Jerez, Spain
12:30	Abdullahi 10'; Taz 19'	Report		Stadium: Montecastillo Training Ground; Attendance: 250

18 January 2019 Friendly	Union Berlin	1−2	SpVgg Unterhaching	Jerez, Spain
14:00	Polter 67' (pk.)	Report	Schimmer 35'; Hain 50'	Stadium: Montecastillo Training Ground; Attendance: 270

18 January 2019 Friendly	Union Berlin	0−0	FC Lausanne-Sport	Jerez, Spain
16:00		Report		Stadium: Montecastillo Training Ground; Attendance: 270; Referee: Daniel Siebert (Berlin)

26 January 2019 Friendly	Union Berlin	2−2	FC Basel 1893	Berlin
14:00	Polter 21'; Prömel 30'	Report	Kalulu 4' van Wolfswinkel 41'	Stadium: Stadion An der Alten Försterei; Attendance: 2,506

20 March 2019 Friendly	FC Rot-Weiss Erfurt	1−4	Union Berlin	Erfurt
18:00	Kelbel 27'	Report	Abdullahi 22', 23', 26'; Eidtner 82'	Stadium: Steigerwaldstadion; Attendance: 2,728

=== 2. Bundesliga ===
==== League table ====
Pos	Team	Pld	W	D	L	GF	GA	GD	Pts	Promotion, qualification or relegation
1	1. FC Köln (C, P)	34	19	6	9	84	47	+37	63	Promotion to Bundesliga
2	SC Paderborn (P)	34	16	9	9	76	50	+26	57	Promotion to Bundesliga
3	Union Berlin (O, P)	34	14	15	5	54	33	+21	57	Qualification for promotion play-offs
4	Hamburger SV	34	16	8	10	45	42	+3	56	
5	1. FC Heidenheim	34	15	10	9	55	45	+10	55	

Source: DFB
Rules for classification: 1) Points; 2) Goal difference; 3) Goals scored; 4) Head-to-head points; 5) Head-to-head goal difference; 6) Head-to-head goals scored; 7) Head-to-head away goals scored; 8) Away goals scored; 9) Play-off.
(C) Champions; (O) Play-off winners; (P) Promoted

==== Results summary ====
Overall								Home						Away					
Pld	W	D	L	GF	GA	GD	Pts	W	D	L	GF	GA	GD	W	D	L	GF	GA	GD
34	14	15	5	54	33	+21	57	11	5	1	34	11	+23	3	10	4	20	22	−2

Last updated: 19 May 2019.

==== Results by round ====
Round	1	2	3	4	5	6	7	8	9	10	11	12	13	14	15	16	17	18	19	20	21	22	23	24	25	26	27	28	29	30	31	32	33	34
Ground	H	A	H	A	H	A	H	A	H	A	H	A	H	A	H	A	H	A	H	A	H	A	H	A	H	A	H	A	H	A	H	A	H	A
Result	W	D	W	D	D	D	W	W	D	D	D	D	W	D	W	D	W	L	W	L	W	W	D	W	W	L	L	D	D	D	W	L	W	D
Position	6	6	1	4	6	5	2	2	2	4	3	4	3	3	3	3	3	4	3	4	3	2	3	3	3	3	3	3	3	4	3	3	3	3

Updated to match(es) played on 19 May 2019. Source: DFB
A = Away; H = Home; W = Win; D = Draw; L = Loss

==== Matches ====
5 August 2018 1	Union Berlin	1−0	FC Erzgebirge Aue	Berlin
15:30	Schmiedebach (yellow card) 44'; Prömel (yellow card) 74'; Kroos 87'	Kicker Report	Cacutalua (yellow card) 2'; Baumgart (yellow card) 84'; Tiffert (yellow card) 90+1'	Stadium: Stadion An der Alten Försterei; Attendance: 21,752; Referee: Benjamin Cortus

13 August 2018 2	1. FC Köln	1−1	Union Berlin	Cologne
20:30	Horn (yellow card) 39'; Clemens 41'; Sobiech (yellow card) 61'	Kicker	Reichel (yellow card) 19'; Andersson 69'	Stadium: RheinEnergieStadion; Attendance: 50,000; Referee: Daniel Schlager

26 August 2018 3	Union Berlin	4−1	FC St. Pauli	Berlin
13:30	Prömel 44'; Gogia 45+2'; Andersson 57', 88'; Redondo (yellow card) 76'	Kicker	Flum (yellow card) 31'; Buchtmann (yellow card) 38'; Sahin (yellow card) 64'	Stadium: Stadion An der Alten Försterei; Attendance: 22,012; Referee: Sven Jablonski

2 September 2018 4	SV Sandhausen	0−0	Union Berlin	Sandhausen
13:30	Kister (yellow card) 24'; Förster (yellow card) 44'	Kicker	Hübner (yellow card) 24'; Hedlund (yellow card) 24'; Prömel (yellow card) 56'	Stadium: BWT-Stadion am Hardtwald; Attendance: 5,517; Referee: Timo Gerach

14 September 2018 5	Union Berlin	2−2	MSV Duisburg	Berlin
18:30	Gogia 44'; Schmiedebach (yellow card) 68'; Hübner 90+1'; Prömel (yellow card) 90+4'	Kicker	Wolze (yellow card) 36'; Tashchy (yellow card) 69'; Souza 77'; Sukuta-Pasu 83', (yellow card) 90'	Stadium: Stadion An der Alten Försterei; Attendance: 20,329; Referee: Michael Bacher

22 September 2018 6	Arminia Bielefeld	1−1	Union Berlin	Bielefeld
13:00	Prietl (yellow card) 45+1'; Salger (yellow card) 45+1'; Voglsammer 65'	Kicker	Prömel 44'; Gogia (yellow card) 45+1'	Stadium: Bielefelder Alm; Attendance: 18,114; Referee: Dr. Martin Thomsen

25 September 2018 7	Union Berlin	2−0	Holstein Kiel	Berlin
18:30	Lenz (yellow card) 67'; Prömel 90'; Polter 90+4'	Kicker	Wahl (yellow card) 57'	Stadium: Stadion An der Alten Försterei; Attendance: 20,879; Referee: Benjamin Cortus

1 October 2018 8	FC Ingolstadt 04	1−2	Union Berlin	Ingolstadt
20:30	Lezcano (yellow card) 42'; Gimber (yellow card) 45+1'; Otávio (yellow card) 56'; Kutschke 80'	Kicker	Andersson 43'; Gogia 73'; Trimmel (yellow card) 81'	Stadium: Audi Sportpark; Attendance: 7,068; Referee: Bastian Dankert

7 October 2018 9	Union Berlin	1−1	1. FC Heidenheim	Berlin
13:30	Andersson (yellow card) 51'; Schmiedebach (yellow card) 59'; Trimmel (yellow card) 90'; Gikiewicz 90+4'	Kicker	Glatzel (yellow card) 7', (goal) 56'; Griesbeck (yellow card) 40'; Andrich (yellow card) 62'; Theuerkauf (yellow card) 90+2'	Stadium: Stadion An der Alten Försterei; Attendance: 20,108; Referee: Benedikt Kempkes

21 October 2018 10	SC Paderborn 07	0−0	Union Berlin	Paderborn
13:30	Nachreiner (yellow card) 53'	Kicker	Prömel (yellow card) 70'; Hübner (yellow card) 77'; Lenz (yellow card) 90+2'	Stadium: Benteler-Arena; Attendance: 11,336; Referee: Dr. Matthias Jöllenbeck

28 October 2018 11	Union Berlin	0−0	Dynamo Dresden	Berlin
13:30	Kroos (yellow card) 62'	Kicker	Aosman (yellow card) 20'; Nikolaou (yellow card) 24' (yellow-red card) 34'; Ebert (yellow card) 41'	Stadium: Stadion An der Alten Försterei; Attendance: 22,012; Referee: Sven Jablonski

4 November 2018 12	SSV Jahn Regensburg	1−1	Union Berlin	Regensburg
13:30	Saller (yellow card) 43'; George 45+1'; Sørensen (yellow card) 62'; Derstroff (yellow card) 89'	Kicker	Prömel (yellow card) 5' (yellow-red card) 77'; Polter 45'; Reichel (yellow card) 54'	Stadium: Continental Arena; Attendance: 10,884; Referee: Sascha Stegemann

11 November 2018 13	Union Berlin	4−0	SpVgg Greuther Fürth	Berlin
13:30	Mees 5', 10'; Polter 29', 56'; Schmiedebach (yellow card) 39'; Trimmel (yellow card) 45'	Kicker	Sauer (yellow card) 83'	Stadium: Stadion An der Alten Försterei; Attendance: 21,785; Referee: Daniel Schlager

26 November 2018 14	Hamburger SV	2−2	Union Berlin	Hamburg
20:30	Hunt 58'; Holtby 65'	Kicker	Mees 12'; Hartel (yellow card) 76'; Trimmel (yellow card) 87'; Hübner (yellow card) 88'; Abdullahi 90'	Stadium: Volksparkstadion; Attendance: 45,584; Referee: Frank Willenborg

1 December 2018 15	Union Berlin	3−1	SV Darmstadt 98	Berlin
13:00	Andersson 28', 42'; Sulu 65' (o.g.)	Kicker	Sulu (yellow card) 44'; Dursun 73'	Stadium: Stadion An der Alten Försterei; Attendance: 21,474; Referee: Marco Fritz

9 December 2018 16	1. FC Magdeburg	1−1	Union Berlin	Magdeburg
13:30	Preißinger (yellow card) 34'; Beck 39'; Costly (yellow card) 90'	Kicker	Abdullahi (yellow card) 10'; Hübner (yellow card) 31'; Gogia 65'; Zulj (yellow card) 84'; Lenz (yellow card) 90'	Stadium: MDCC-Arena; Attendance: 23,149; Referee: Dr. Felix Brych

15 December 2018 17	Union Berlin	2−0	VfL Bochum	Berlin
13:00	Andersson 69' (pen.); Parensen (yellow card) 71'; Zulj 87'	Kicker		Stadium: Stadion An der Alten Försterei; Attendance: 20,728; Referee: Dr. Matthias Jöllenbeck

23 December 2018 18	Erzgebirge Aue	3−0	Union Berlin	Aue
13:30	Testroet 6', 30' (pen.), 74'; Cacutalua (yellow card) 34'; Fandrich (yellow card) 56'; Rizzuto (yellow card) 70'	Kicker	Andersson (yellow card) 34'; Hübner (yellow card) 76'	Stadium: Erzgebirgsstadion; Attendance: 13,800; Referee: Sven Jablonski

31 January 2019 19	Union Berlin	2−0	1. FC Köln	Berlin
20:30	Hartel 1'; Trimmel (yellow card) 29'; Hübner 30'; Friedrich (yellow card) 50'; Reichel (yellow card) 58' (yellow-red card) 66'	Kicker	Terodde (yellow card) 45+2'; Geis (yellow card) 73'; Schmitz (yellow card) 78'	Stadium: Stadion An der Alten Försterei; Attendance: 22,012; Referee: Tobias Welz

24 February 2019 20	FC St. Pauli	3−2	Union Berlin	St. Pauli
20:30	Allagui (yellow card) 4', (goal) 23'; Flum (yellow card) 33'; Meier 62', 90+4' (pen.); Knoll (yellow card) 84'	Kicker	Schmiedebach (yellow card) 12'; Friedrich (yellow card) 37'; Lenz (yellow card) 60'; Prömel 84'; Abdullahi 86'	Stadium: Millerntor-Stadion; Attendance: 29,546; Referee: Guido Winkmann

9 February 2019 21	Union Berlin	2−0	SV Sandhausen	Berlin
13:00	Andersson 11', (yellow card) 81'; Kroos (yellow card) 41'; Gogia 87'	Kicker	Taffertshofer (yellow card) 30'; Diekmeier (yellow card) 53'	Stadium: Stadion An der Alten Försterei; Attendance: 19,542; Referee: Tobias Stieler

16 February 2019 22	MSV Duisburg	2−3	Union Berlin	Duisburg
13:00	Wiegel (yellow card) 20'; Nielsen 45'; Fröde 56'; Verhoek (yellow card) 59'; Iljutcenko (yellow card) 62'	Kicker	Zulj 11'; Schmiedebach (yellow card) 17'; Hartel 64'; Gogia (yellow card) 71'; Andersson 89'	Stadium: Schauinsland-Reisen-Arena; Attendance: 12,316; Referee: Timo Gerach

22 February 2019 23	Union Berlin	1−1	Arminia Bielefeld	Berlin
18:30	Mees 23'; Hübner (yellow card) 71'; Schmiedebach (yellow card) 77'; Abdullahi (yellow card) 82'	Kicker	Behrendt (yellow card) 29'; Clauss 61'; Voglsammer (yellow card) 80'	Stadium: Stadion An der Alten Försterei; Attendance: 21,286; Referee: Christian Dietz

1 March 2019 24	Holstein Kiel	0−2	Union Berlin	Kiel
18:30	van den Bergh (yellow card) 77'; Dehm (yellow card) 80'; Mühling (yellow card) 84'	Kicker	Kroos 27'; Trimmel (yellow card) 54'; Schmiedebach (yellow card) 70'; Mees (yellow card) 83'; Andersson 90+1'	Stadium: Holstein-Stadion; Attendance: 9,866; Referee: Benjamin Cortus

8 March 2019 25	Union Berlin	2−0	FC Ingolstadt 04	Berlin
18:30	Andersson 43' (pen.); Schmiedebach (yellow card) 49'; Gogia (yellow card) 65', (goal) 79'; Prömel (yellow card) 70'; Rapp (yellow card) 78'	Kicker	Kotzke (yellow card) 19'; Cohen (yellow card) 38' (yellow-red card) 65'; Krauße (yellow card) 48' (yellow-red card) 75'; Otávio (yellow card) 62'	Stadium: Stadion An der Alten Försterei; Attendance: 21,419; Referee: Dr. Robert Kampka

15 March 2019 26	1. FC Heidenheim	2−1	Union Berlin	Heidenheim an der Brenz
18:30	Griesbeck (yellow card) 8'; Glatzel 48'; Schnatterer 56'	Kicker	Žulj 23'; Hübner (yellow card) 58'; Mané (yellow card) 88'; Trimmel (yellow card) 90+1'	Stadium: Voith-Arena; Attendance: 11,150; Referee: Sascha Stegemann

30 March 2019 27	Union Berlin	1−3	SC Paderborn 07	Berlin
13:00	Trimmel (yellow card) 33'; Polter 90+4'	Kicker	Antwi-Adjei 41'; Gjasula (yellow card) 84'; Michel 87'; Schonlau (yellow card) 89'; Klement 90+1'	Stadium: Stadion An der Alten Försterei; Attendance: 20,789; Referee: Michael Bacher

7 April 2019 28	Dynamo Dresden	0−0	Union Berlin	Dresden
13:30		Kicker	Prömel (yellow card) 64'; Reichel (yellow card) 83'; Hübner (yellow card) 86'	Stadium: Rudolf-Harbig-Stadion; Attendance: 30,700; Referee: Bibiana Steinhaus

12 April 2019 29	Union Berlin	2−2	SSV Jahn Regensburg	Berlin
18:30	Andersson 13'; Gikiewicz (yellow card) 16'; Polter 83'	Kicker	Adamyan 16' (pen.); Correia (yellow card) 29'; Saller (yellow card) 30'; Al Ghaddioui 58'	Stadium: Stadion An der Alten Försterei; Attendance: 20,243; Referee: Harm Osmers

20 April 2019 30	SpVgg Greuther Fürth	1−1	Union Berlin	Fürth
13:00	Atanga (yellow card) 31'; Keita-Ruel (red card) 38'; Caligiuri 67'	Kicker	Mees 35'; Kroos (yellow card) 38'; Prömel (yellow card) 64'; Rapp (red card) 70'; Friedrich (yellow card) 81'	Stadium: Sportpark Ronhof Thomas Sommer; Attendance: 9,650; Referee: Dr. Martin Thomsen

28 April 2019 31	Union Berlin	2−0	Hamburger SV	Berlin
13:30	Žulj 46'; Kroos (yellow card) 81'; Trimmel (yellow card) 82'; Prömel 84'	Kicker	Douglas (yellow card) 81'; Lacroix (yellow card) 90+4'	Stadium: Stadion An der Alten Försterei; Attendance: 22,012; Referee: Sascha Stegemann

5 May 2019 32	SV Darmstadt 98	2−1	Union Berlin	Darmstadt
13:30	Stark 49'; Mehlem (yellow card) 60'; Wittek 77'	Kicker	Žulj (yellow card) 69'; Andersson (yellow card) 71', (goal) 87'	Stadium: Merck-Stadion am Böllenfalltor; Attendance: 11,510; Referee: Bastian Dankert

12 May 2019 33	Union Berlin	3−0	1. FC Magdeburg	Berlin
15:30	Prömel 8'; Polter 31', 90+6', (yellow card) 90+7'	Kicker	Ignjovski (yellow card) 49'	Stadium: Stadion An der Alten Försterei; Attendance: 22,012; Referee: Robert Schröder

19 May 2019 34	VfL Bochum	2−2	Union Berlin	Bochum
15:30	Losilla 24', (yellow card) 77'; Riemann (yellow card) 35'; M'boussy (yellow card) 41' (yellow-red card) 72', (goal) 49' (pen.)	Kicker	Hübner (yellow card) 34'; Prömel (yellow card) 48', (goal) 83'; Mees 86'; Reichel (yellow card) 90+5'	Stadium: Vonovia-Ruhrstadion; Attendance: 24,500; Referee: Harm Osmers

=== Relegation play-offs ===
First Leg

23 May 2019
20:30

VfB Stuttgart	2–2	Union Berlin
Gentner 41'; Gómez 51'	Report	Abdullahi 43'; Friedrich 68'

Mercedes-Benz Arena, Stuttgart
Attendance: 58,619
Referee: Bastian Dankert

Second Leg

27 May 2019
20:30

Union Berlin	0–0	VfB Stuttgart
	Report

Stadion An der Alten Försterei, Berlin
Attendance: 22,012
Referee: Christian Dingert

2–2 on aggregate. Union Berlin won on away goals and are promoted to the Bundesliga, while VfB Stuttgart are relegated to the 2. Bundesliga.

=== DFB-Pokal ===
19 August 2018 R1	FC Carl Zeiss Jena	2–4	Union Berlin	Jena
18:30	Wolfram 21'; Trimmel 42' (o.g.)	Kicker	Andersson 14'; Kroos 29'; Hedlund 45+5' (pen.), 71'	Stadium: Ernst-Abbe-Sportfeld; Attendance: 10,600; Referee: Dr. Felix Brych

31 October 2018 R2	Borussia Dortmund	3–2 (a.e.t.)	Union Berlin	Dortmund
18:30	Pulisic 40'; Hakimi (yellow card) 61'; Maximilian Philipp 73'; Reus 120+1' (pen.); Witsel (yellow card) 120'	Kicker	Polter 63', 88'; Friedrich (yellow card) 109' (yellow-red card) 118'; Trimmel (yellow card) 115'; Hübner (yellow card) 120'	Stadium: Signal Iduna Park; Attendance: 72,732; Referee: Guido Winkmann

== Squad and statistics ==
As of 27 May 2019

No.	Pos	Player	2. Bundesliga		DFB-Pokal		Play-offs		Total	
No.	Pos	Player	Apps	Goals	Apps	Goals	Apps	Goals	Apps	Goals
1	GK	(Poland) Rafał Gikiewicz	34	1	2	0	2	0	38	1
5	DF	(Germany) Marvin Friedrich	34	0	2	0	2	1	38	1
6	MF	(Norway) Julian Ryerson	8	0	0	0	1	0	9	0
7	MF	(Germany) Marcel Hartel	26	2	1	0	2	0	29	2
8	MF	(Germany) Joshua Mees	18	6	0	0	2	0	20	6
9	FW	(Germany) Sebastian Polter	20	9	1	2	0	0	21	11
10	FW	(Sweden) Sebastian Andersson	34	12	2	1	2	0	38	13
11	MF	(Germany) Akaki Gogia	28	6	1	0	2	0	31	6
12	GK	(Denmark) Jakob Busk	0	0	0	0	0	0	0	0
14	DF	(Germany) Ken Reichel	27	0	1	0	2	0	30	0
15	DF	(Spain) Marc Torrejón	0	0	0	0	0	0	0	0
17	FW	(Portugal) Carlos Mané	8	0	0	0	0	0	8	0
18	DF	(Germany) Nicolai Rapp	3	0	0	0	0	0	3	0
19	DF	(Germany) Florian Hübner	28	2	1	0	1	0	30	2
20	FW	(Nigeria) Suleiman Abdullahi	19	2	1	0	2	1	22	3
21	MF	(Germany) Grischa Prömel	29	7	2	0	2	0	33	7
23	MF	(Germany) Felix Kroos	25	2	1	1	1	0	27	3
24	MF	(Germany) Manuel Schmiedebach	32	0	2	0	2	0	36	0
25	DF	(Germany) Christopher Lenz	11	0	2	0	0	0	13	0
27	MF	(Kosovo) Eroll Zejnullahu	0	0	0	0	0	0	0	0
28	DF	(Austria) Christopher Trimmel	32	0	2	0	1	0	35	0
29	MF	(Germany) Michael Parensen	9	0	1	0	2	0	12	0
30	GK	(Germany) Lennart Moser	0	0	0	0	0	0	0	0
31	MF	(Turkey) Berkan Taz	1	0	0	0	0	0	1	0
32	MF	(Austria) Robert Žulj	29	4	1	0	2	0	32	4
33	DF	(United States) Lennard Maloney	0	0	0	0	0	0	0	0
34	DF	(Germany) Fabian Schönheim	0	0	0	0	0	0	0	0
Players transferred out during the season
3	DF	(Austria) Christoph Schösswendter	0	0	0	0	0	0	0	0
17	FW	(Sweden) Simon Hedlund	11	0	2	2	0	0	13	2
18	FW	(Germany) Kenny Prince Redondo	7	0	1	0	0	0	8	0
