= 2017–18 1. FC Union Berlin season =

1. FC Union Berlin
2017–18 season
- President: Dirk Zingler
- Manager: Jens Keller
- Stadium: Stadion An der Alten Försterei
- 2. Bundesliga: 8th
- DFB-Pokal: Second round
Home colours	Away colours

The 2017–18 1. FC Union Berlin season was the 52nd season in the football club's history and 8th consecutive season in the second division of German football, the 2. Bundesliga and 12th overall. In addition to the domestic league, 1. FC Union Berlin also participated in this season's edition of the domestic cup, the DFB-Pokal. This was the 52nd season for 1. FC Union Berlin in the Stadion An der Alten Försterei, located in Köpenick, Berlin, Germany. The season covers a period from 1 July 2017 to 30 June 2018.

== Players ==
=== Squad information ===
As of 7 February 2018

Note: Flags indicate national team as defined under FIFA eligibility rules; some limited exceptions apply. Players may hold more than one non-FIFA nationality.

No.	Pos.	Nation	Player
1	GK	GER	Daniel Mesenhöler
3	DF	AUT	Christoph Schösswendter
4	DF	GER	Lars Dietz
5	DF	GER	Marvin Friedrich
6	DF	DEN	Kristian Pedersen
7	MF	GER	Marcel Hartel
8	MF	GER	Stephan Fürstner
9	FW	GER	Sebastian Polter
10	MF	GER	Dennis Daube
11	FW	GER	Akaki Gogia
12	GK	DEN	Jakob Busk
13	DF	GER	Peter Kurzweg
15	DF	ESP	Marc Torrejón
16	FW	AUT	Philipp Hosiner

No.	Pos.	Nation	Player
17	FW	SWE	Simon Hedlund
18	FW	GER	Kenny Prince Redondo
20	GK	GER	Lennart Moser
21	MF	GER	Grischa Prömel
23	MF	GER	Felix Kroos (Captain)
24	FW	GER	Steven Skrzybski
28	DF	AUT	Christopher Trimmel
29	MF	GER	Michael Parensen
31	MF	GER	Berkan Taz
33	DF	GER	Lennard Maloney
34	DF	GER	Fabian Schönheim
36	MF	GER	Cihan Kahraman
37	DF	GER	Toni Leistner

=== Transfers ===
==== Summer ====
In:

No.	Pos.	Nation	Player
2	DF	JPN	Atsuto Uchida (from FC Schalke 04)
3	DF	AUT	Christoph Schößwendter (from SK Rapid Wien)
7	MF	GER	Marcel Hartel (from 1. FC Köln)
11	MF	GER	Akaki Gogia (from Brentford, previously on loan at Dynamo Dresden)
13	DF	GER	Peter Kurzweg (from Würzburger Kickers)
15	DF	ESP	Marc Torrejón (from SC Freiburg)
21	MF	GER	Grischa Prömel (from Karlsruher SC)

Out:

No.	Pos.	Nation	Player
3	DF	AUT	Emanuel Pogatetz (to LASK Linz)
4	DF	CRO	Roberto Punčec (to HNK Rijeka)
5	DF	GER	Benjamin Kessel (to 1. FC Kaiserslautern)
7	MF	GER	Benjamin Köhler (Released)
11	MF	GER	Maximilian Thiel (to 1. FC Heidenheim)
13	MF	GER	Raffael Korte (to SV Waldhof Mannheim)
14	MF	SUI	Adrian Nikçi (Released)
27	MF	KOS	Eroll Zejnullahu (on loan to SV Sandhausen)
39	MF	GER	Lukas Lämmel (Released)

==== Winter ====
In:

No.	Pos.	Nation	Player
4	MF	GER	Lars Dietz (from Borussia Dortmund II)
5	DF	GER	Marvin Friedrich (from FC Augsburg)

Out:

No.	Pos.	Nation	Player
2	DF	JPN	Atsuto Uchida (to Kashima Antlers)
19	MF	CRO	Damir Kreilach (to Real Salt Lake)
30	GK	AUT	Michael Gspurning (Retired)

== Matches ==
=== Legend ===
Win Draw Loss

=== Friendly matches ===
25 June 2017 Friendly	Friedrichshagener SV 1912	0−16	Union Berlin	Berlin
15:00		Report	Hosiner 6'; Hartel 10', 13'; Hedlund 15', 43'; Skrzybski 27', 38'; Fürstner 41'; Redondo 49', 56', 90'; Kroos 50'; Kreilach 55', 86'; Polter 68', 89'	Stadium: Sportanlage Friedrichshagen; Attendance: 2,000; Referee: Alexander Terzibaschian (Berlin)

1 July 2017 Friendly	FSV Barleben	1−7	Union Berlin	Barleben
15:00	Kalkutschke 83'	Report	Kreilach 7'; Skrzybski 30'; Hosiner 50', 69', 78', 90'; Pedersen 53'	Stadium: Sportplatz am Barleber Anger; Attendance: 589; Referee: Karsten Fettback (Stendal)

2 July 2017 Friendly	BSV Guben Nord	0−7	Union Berlin	Guben
15:00		Report	Taz 30'; Hedlund 39'; Kahraman 54'; Ullrich 56' (o.g.); Hartel 76'; Kurzweg 79'; Polter 85' (pen.)	Stadium: Sportanlagen Baumschulenweg; Attendance: 1,500; Referee: Marcel Riemer (Eisenhüttenstadt)

7 July 2017 Friendly	Wolfsberger AC	2−4	Union Berlin	Wolfsberg, Austria
19:00	Ouédraogo 31'; Gschweidl 55'	Report	Hosiner 36'; Hartel 62'; Fürstner 64'; Kahraman 83'	Stadium: Lavanttal-Arena; Attendance: 500; Referee: Stefan Krassnitzer

11 July 2017 Friendly	Birmingham City	0−1	Union Berlin	Wolfsberg, Austria
18:00		Report	Kreilach 61'	Stadium: Lavanttal-Arena; Attendance: 450; Referee: Christian Maier

16 July 2017 Friendly	Hallescher FC	1−5	Union Berlin	Halle (Saale)
14:00	Ajani 34'	Report	Kroos 41'; Hosiner 54'; Skrzybski 63'; Redondo 70'; Kreilach 79'	Stadium: Erdgas Sportpark; Attendance: 3,394; Referee: Thomas Stein (Würzburg)

18 July 2017 Friendly	SV Babelsberg 03	0−3	Union Berlin	Potsdam
19:00		Report	Schönheim 14', 73'; Polter 62'	Stadium: Karl-Liebknecht-Stadion; Attendance: 3,102; Referee: Christopher Musick (Friedland)

22 July 2017 Friendly	Union Berlin	P−P	Queens Park Rangers	Berlin
15:30		Report		Stadium: Stadion An der Alten Försterei; Attendance: 10,000; Referee: Henry Müller (Cottbus)

24 July 2017 Friendly	Union Berlin	2−1	Queens Park Rangers	Berlin
18:00	Kreilach 19'; Hosiner 75'	Report	Smith 49'	Stadium: Stadion An der Alten Försterei; Attendance: 8,050; Referee: Henry Müller (Cottbus)

31 August 2017 Friendly	Hertha BSC	0−2	Union Berlin	Berlin
13:30		Report	Hosiner 71'; Maloney 82'; Kurzweg (yellow card) 83'	Stadium: Stadion auf dem Wurfplatz; Attendance: closed-doors Referee: Rasmus Jessen (Berolina Stralau)

3 October 2017 Friendly	Berlin-Liga XI	0−6	Union Berlin	Berlin
14:00		Report		Stadium: Helmut-Schleusener-Stadion; Attendance: 1,140; Referee: Marcel Malassa (Südring)

5 October 2017 Friendly	Union Berlin	2−2	Dinamo Brest	Berlin
18:00	Hosiner 30'; Gogia 50'	Report	Aliseiko 33'; Premudrov 52'	Stadium: Stadion An der Alten Försterei; Attendance: closed-doors Referee: Lasse Koslowski (Berlin)

9 November 2017 Friendly	Union Berlin	1−1	Horsens	Berlin
18:00	Dreilach 20'	Report	Thychosen 44'	Stadium: Stadion An der Alten Försterei; Attendance: 707; Referee: Daniel Siebert (Berlin)

10 January 2018 Friendly	Union Berlin	3−1	Gent	Oliva, Spain
15:00	Polter 50'; Hedlund 54'; Hosiner 81'	Report	Esiti 12'	Stadium: Oliva Nova Beach & Golf Resort; Attendance: 350

12 January 2018 Friendly	Union Berlin	2−3	SV Wehen Wiesbaden	Oliva, Spain
15:00	Skrzybski 81', 83'	Report	Schäffler 10'; Andrist 37'; Diawusie 67'	Stadium: Oliva Nova Beach & Golf Resort; Attendance: 350

17 January 2018 Friendly	Union Berlin	1−1	FC Ingolstadt 04	Luckenwalde
17:30	Skrzybski 77'	Report	Thalhammer 85'	Stadium: Werner-Seelenbinder-Stadion; Attendance: 503; Referee: Florian Lechner (Wismar)

22 March 2018 Friendly	Union Berlin	0−3	VfL Wolfsburg	Berlin
18:30		Report	William 73'; Osimhen 80'; Kramer 90'	Stadium: Stadion An der Alten Försterei; Attendance: 1,040

26 March 2018 Friendly	Holstein Kiel	3−2	Union Berlin	Kiel
14:30	Siedschlag 22'; Weilandt 62'; Janzer 74'	Report	Leistner 8'; Hosiner 63'	Stadium: Nachwuchsleistungszentrums der Störche; Attendance: 644; Referee: Patrick Schult (Osterbek)

16 May 2018 Friendly	SV Hanse Neubrandenburg 01	0−11	Union Berlin	Neubrandenburg
18:30		Report	Taz 10', 42', 80'; Torrejón 20'; Hosiner 24', 31'; Grischa Prömel 47'; Hartel 71'; Werner 85', 89'; Kellmann 86' (o.g.)	Stadium: neu.sw Stadion; Attendance: 1,480; Referee: Sven Frericks (Altlüdersdorf)

18 May 2018 Friendly	SV Tasmania Berlin	0−6	Union Berlin	Berlin
18:30		Report	Prömel 24', 47'; Werner 55'; Taz 62'; Gogia 71'; Hosiner 78'	Stadium: Werner-Seelenbinder-Sportpark; Attendance: 250; Referee: Marcel Malassa (Südring)

20 May 2018 Friendly	Türkiyemspor Berlin	1−9	Union Berlin	Berlin
15:30	Jagne 60'	Report	Hosiner 6', 15'; Taz 8', 52'; Hartel 49', 61'; Prömel 74'; Gogia 79'; Torrejón 84'	Stadium: Willy-Kressmann-Stadion; Attendance: 1,500; Referee: Deniz Aylin Acur (Staaken)

=== 2. Bundesliga ===
==== League table ====
Pos	Team	Pld	W	D	L	GF	GA	GD	Pts
6	VfL Bochum	34	13	9	12	37	40	−3	48
7	MSV Duisburg	34	13	9	12	52	56	−4	48
8	Union Berlin	34	12	11	11	54	46	+8	47
9	FC Ingolstadt	34	12	9	13	47	45	+2	45
10	Darmstadt 98	34	10	13	11	47	45	+2	43

Source: DFB
Rules for classification: 1) Points; 2) Goal difference; 3) Goals scored

==== Results summary ====
Overall								Home						Away					
Pld	W	D	L	GF	GA	GD	Pts	W	D	L	GF	GA	GD	W	D	L	GF	GA	GD
34	12	11	11	54	46	+8	47	7	7	3	30	19	+11	5	4	8	24	27	−3

Last updated: 13 May 2018.
Source: Kicker

==== Results by round ====
Round	1	2	3	4	5	6	7	8	9	10	11	12	13	14	15	16	17	18	19	20	21	22	23	24	25	26	27	28	29	30	31	32	33	34
Ground	A	H	A	H	A	H	A	H	A	A	H	A	H	A	H	A	H	H	A	H	A	H	A	H	A	H	H	A	H	A	H	A	H	A
Result	W	W	D	D	L	D	L	W	W	W	W	D	W	L	D	L	L	L	D	L	D	W	L	W	L	D	D	L	D	W	D	L	W	W
Position	3	2	6	4	7	8	10	7	7	4	4	4	3	4	4	4	4	6	7	9	10	8	10	7	8	8	8	11	11	9	9	10	9	8

Updated to match(es) played on 13 May 2018. Source: Kicker
A = Away; H = Home; W = Win; D = Draw; L = Loss

==== Matches ====
29 July 2017 1	FC Ingolstadt 04	0−1	Union Berlin	Ingolstadt
13:00		Union Report; Kicker Report; DFL Report	Polter (yellow card) 58'; Trimmel 59'; Pedersen (yellow card) 77'; Torrejón (yellow card) 88'	Stadium: Audi Sportpark; Attendance: 10,870; Referee: Sascha Stegemann (Niederkassel)

4 August 2017 2	Union Berlin	4–3	Holstein Kiel	Berlin
18:30	Kreilach 14'; Skrzybski 24', 52'; Hedlund 27'; Kroos (yellow card) 56'; Trimmel (yellow card) 81'	Union Report; Kicker Report; DFL Report	Schindler 12'; Pedersen 16' (o.g.); Drexler 32'; Mühling (yellow card) 55'; Lenz (yellow card) 64'	Stadium: Stadion An der Alten Försterei; Attendance: 21,242; Referee: Frank Willenborg (Osnabrück)

20 August 2017 3	1. FC Nürnberg	2–2	Union Berlin	Nuremberg
13:30	Leibold (yellow card) 41'; Teuchert 55'; Behrens 90'	Union Report; Kicker Report; DFL Report	Trimmel (yellow card) 15'; Hedlund 47'; Polter 66'; Prömel (red card) 90+2'	Stadium: Max-Morlock-Stadion; Attendance: 29,813; Referee: Robert Schröder (Hanover)

27 August 2017 4	Union Berlin	1–1	Arminia Bielefeld	Berlin
13:30	Hartel 55'; Torrejón (yellow card) 76'	Union Report; Kircker Report; DFL Report	Dick (yellow card) 35'; Voglsammer 46'; Staude (yellow card) 89'; Hemlein (yellow card) 90+1'	Stadium: Stadion An der Alten Försterei; Attendance: 21,034; Referee: Christian Dietz (Munich)

10 September 2017 5	Fortuna Düsseldorf	3–2	Union Berlin	Düsseldorf
13:30	Sobottka 17'; Raman (yellow card) 65'; Gießelmann (yellow card) 67'; Usami 84'; Neuhaus 90'	Union Report; Kicker Report; DFL Report	Gogia (yellow card) 33'; Leistner (yellow card) 35'; Kreilach 69'; Ayhan 78' (o.g.); Hartel (yellow card) 86'	Stadium: Esprit Arena; Attendance: 26,341; Referee: Arne Aarnink (Nordhorn)

15 September 2017 6	Union Berlin	1−1	Eintracht Braunschweig	Berlin
19:00 (Note: The Union Berlin v Eintracht Braunschweig match, originally scheduled for 18:30 CEST, was delayed to 19:00 CEST due to a traffic jam on the A2 highway.)	Gogia (yellow card) 19'; Hedlund 52', (yellow card) 81'	Union Report; Kicker Report; DFL Report	Hernández (yellow card) 33'; Nyman 62'; Valsvik (yellow card) 89'	Stadium: Stadion An der Alten Försterei; Attendance: 21,114; Referee: Sören Storks (Velen)

19 September 2017 7	SV Sandhausen	1−0	Union Berlin	Sandhausen
18:30	Klingmann (yellow card) 31'; Paqarada 55'	Union Report; Kicker Report; DFL report	Polter (yellow card) 90+1'	Stadium: BWT-Stadion am Hardtwald; Attendance: 4,800; Referee: Alexander Sather (Grimma)

25 September 2017 8	Union Berlin	5−0	1. FC Kaiserslautern	Berlin
20:30	Polter 6', 25', 77', (penalty missed) 28'; Modica 11' (o.g.); Kroos (yellow card) 16'; Skrzybski 32'; Trimmel (yellow card) 74'	Union Report; Kicker Report; DFL Report	Moritz (yellow card) 18'; Andersson (yellow card) 27'; Guwara (yellow card) 35'; Mwene (yellow card) 87'	Stadium: Stadion An der Alten Försterei; Attendance: 20,592; Referee: Markus Schmidt (Stuttgart)

30 September 2017 9	FC Erzgebirge Aue	1−2	Union Berlin	Aue
13:00	Bertram 73'	Union Report; Kicker Report; DFL Report	Hartel 55'; Polter 70'; Gogia (yellow card) 90+1'	Stadium: Sparkassen-Erzgebirgsstadion; Attendance: 9,450; Referee: Benjamin Cortus (Röthenbach an der Pegnitz)

15 October 2017 10	SSV Jahn Regensburg	0−2	Union Berlin	Regensburg
13:30	Geipl (penalty missed) 20', (yellow card) 35'; Lais (yellow card) 53'; Nachreiner (yellow card) 76'	Union Report; Kicker Report; DFL Report	Polter 20'; Gogia (yellow card) 27', (goal) 57'; Schönheim (yellow card) 71'	Stadium: Continental Arena; Attendance: 9,791; Referee: Benedikt Kempkes (Thür)

21 October 2017 11	Union Berlin	3−1	SpVgg Greuther Fürth	Berlin
13:00	Kurzweg 3'; Gogia 41'; Hedlund 76'	Union Report; Kicker Report; DFL Report	Magyar (yellow card) 15'; Wittek 57'	Stadium: Stadion An der Alten Försterei; Attendance: 21,344; Referee: Martin Petersen (Stuttgart)

29 October 2017 12	MSV Duisburg	1−1	Union Berlin	Duisburg
13:30	Wiegel (yellow card) 4'; Schnellhardt (yellow card) 76'; Iljutcenko 76'	Union Report; Kicker Report; DFL Report	Leistner 49', (yellow card) 57'; Trimmel (yellow card) 73'	Stadium: MSV-Arena; Attendance: 15,492; Referee: Christian Dietz (Munich)

4 November 2017 13	Union Berlin	1−0	FC St. Pauli	Berlin
13:00	Trimmel (yellow card) 80'; Polter 90+2'	Union Report; Kicker Report; DFL Report	Allagui (yellow card) 34'	Stadium: Stadion An der Alten Försterei; Attendance: 22,012; Referee: Bastian Dankert (Rostock)

18 November 2017 14	1. FC Heidenheim	4−3	Union Berlin	Heidenheim an der Brenz
13:00	Feick 44'; Verhoek 61', 74'; Schnatterer 66'; Thiel (yellow card) 78'; Philp (yellow card) 90+3'	Union Report; Kicker Report; DFL Report	Kreilach (yellow card) 32'; Pedersen (yellow card) 59'; Polter 63' (pen.); Skrzybski 72' 75'	Stadium: Voith-Arena; Attendance: 12,000; Referee: Deniz Aytekin (Oberasbach)

24 November 2017 15	Union Berlin	3−3	SV Darmstadt 98	Berlin
18:30	Prömel (yellow card) 2', (goal) 38'; Daube (yellow card) 45'; Polter 58' (pen.); Rosenthal 90+4' (pen.)	Union Berlin; Kicker Report; DFL Report	Sirigu (yellow card) 18'; Banggaard (yellow card) 27'; Boyd (yellow card) 29', (goal) 51' 61'; Kempe 66' (pen.); Hamit Altıntop (yellow card) 72'	Stadium: Stadion An der Alten Försterei; Attendance: 21,108; Referee: Timo Gerach (Landau)

3 December 2017 16	VfL Bochum	2−1	Union Berlin	Bochum
13:30	Stöger 40'; Janelt (yellow card) 65'; Sam (yellow card) 74'; Hinterseer 87'	Union Report; Kicker Report; DFL Report	Polter 4'; Trimmel (yellow card) 57'; Hedlund (yellow card) 64'	Stadium: Vonovia Ruhrstadion; Attendance: 13,119; Referee: Matthias Jöllenbeck (Freiburg im Breisgau)

9 December 2017 17	Union Berlin	0−1	Dynamo Dresden	Berlin
13:00	Torrejón (yellow card) 73'	Union Report; Kicker Report; DFL Report	Seguin (yellow card) 69'; Lambertz 71' (yellow card) 90'	Stadium: Stadion An der Alten Försterei; Attendance: 22,012; Referee: Bastian Dankert (Rostock)

15 December 2017 18	Union Berlin	1−2	FC Ingolstadt 04	Berlin
18:30	Skrzybski 59' (pen.); Kroos (yellow card) 60'; Fürstner (yellow card) 63'	Union Report; Kicker Report; DFL Report	Leipertz 73', (yellow card) 74'; Lezcano 77' (pen.); Levels (yellow card) 90+2'	Stadium: Stadion An der Alten Försterei; Attendance: 20,170; Referee: Martin Petersen (Stuttgart)

23 January 2017 19	Holstein Kiel	2−2	Union Berlin	Kiel
20:30	Weilandt (yellow card) 7', (goal) 9'; Drexler 19'; Lewerenz (yellow card) 71'; Kinsombi (red card) 84'	Union Report; Kicker Report; DFL Report	Hartel (yellow card) 22'; Skrzybski 32'; Kroos (yellow card) 71'; Polter 85' (pen.)	Stadium: Holstein-Stadion; Attendance: 11,503; Referee: Aarne Aarnink (Nordhorn)

26 January 2018 20	Union Berlin	0−1	1. FC Nürnberg	Berlin
18:30	Leistner (yellow card) 71' (yellow-red card) 83'Hosiner (red card) 89'	Union Report; Kicker Report; DFL Report	Ewerton 11'; Behrens (yellow card) 77'; Salli (red card) 89'	Stadium: Stadion An der Alten Försterei; Attendance: 21,734; Referee: Patrick Ittrich (Hamburg)

5 February 2018 21	Arminia Bielefeld	1−1	Union Berlin	Bielefeld
20:30	Kerschbaumer 53'; Behrendt (yellow card) 90+4'	Union Report; Kicker Report; DFL Report	Skrzybski 15'	Stadium: SchücoArena; Attendance: 13,542; Referee: Tobias Reichel (Stuttgart)

10 February 2018 22	Union Berlin	3−1	Fortuna Düsseldorf	Berlin
13:00	Polter (yellow card) 45+2', (goal) 71'; Skrzybski 67' (pen.), 90+5'; Hedlund (yellow card) 72'; Kroos (yellow card) 74'	Union Report; Kicker Report; DFL Report	Neuhaus 41'; Gießelmann (yellow card) 45'; Bodzek (yellow card) 67'; Raman (yellow card) 73'	Stadium: Stadion An der Alten Försterei; Attendance: 22,012; Referee: Robert Hartmann (Wangen)

18 February 2018 23	Eintracht Braunschweig	1−0	Union Berlin	Braunschweig
13:30	Reichel 16'	Union Report; Kicker Report; DFL Report	Parensen (yellow card) 60'; Gogia (yellow card) 90'	Stadium: Eintracht-Stadion; Attendance: 21,150; Referee: Benedikt Kempkes (Thür)

24 February 2018 24	Union Berlin	2−1	SV Sandhausen	Berlin
13:00	Skrzybski 4', (yellow card) 50'; Pedersen 20'	Union Report; Kicker Report; DFL Report	Förster 48'; Gíslason (yellow card) 56'; Aygüneş (yellow card) 90+2'	Stadium: Stadion An der Alten Försterei; Attendance: 18,974; Referee: Benjamin Brand (Unterspiesheim)

2 March 2018 25	1. FC Kaiserslautern	4−3	Union Berlin	Kaiserslautern
18:30	Borrello 6'; Andersson 41'; Guwara (yellow card) 59'; Moritz 66' (pen.); Mwene (yellow card) 84', (goal) 86'; Kessel (yellow card) 90+5'	Union Report; Kicker Report; DFL Report	Andersson 36' (o.g.); Skrzybski 51', 81'	Stadium: Fritz-Walter-Stadion; Attendance: 20,087; Referee: Sven Waschitzki (Essen)

11 March 2018 26	Union Berlin	0−0	FC Erzgebirge Aue	Berlin
13:30	Kroos (yellow card) 70'	Union Report; Kicker Report; DFL Report	Wydra (yellow card) 52'; Kvesić (yellow card) 55'; Kalig (yellow card) 90+2'	Stadium: Stadion An der Alten Försterei; Attendance: 21,788; Referee: Martin Petersen (Stuttgart)

17 March 2018 27	Union Berlin	2−2	SSV Jahn Regensburg	Berlin
13:00	Kroos 45'; Hosiner 63'	Union Report; Kicker Report; DFL Report	Lais (yellow card) 49'; Grüttner 59'; George (yellow card) 62'; Knoll 89' (pen.); Gimber (yellow card) 90'	Stadium: Stadion An der Alten Försterei; Attendance: 21,248; Referee: Guido Winkmann (Kerken)

1 April 2018 28	SpVgg Greuther Fürth	2−1	Union Berlin	Fürth
13:30	Hilbert 21'; Maloča (yellow card) 65'; Prömel 75' (o.g.)	Union Report; Kicker Report; DFL Report	Hedlund (yellow card) 32'; Friedrich 49'	Stadium: Sportpark Ronhof Thomas Sommer; Attendance: 9,170; Referee: Timo Gerach (Landau)

7 April 2018 29	Union Berlin	0−0	MSV Duisburg	Berlin
13:00	Trimmel (yellow card) 29'	Union Report; Kicker Report; DFL Report		Stadium: Stadion An der Alten Försterei; Attendance: 22,012; Referee: Florian Heft (Neuenkirchen)

14 April 2018 30	FC St. Pauli	0−1	Union Berlin	Hamburg
13:00	Buballa (yellow card) 71'; Şahin (yellow card) 90'	Union Report; Kicker Report; DFL Report	Friedrich (yellow card) 5' (yellow-red card) 56'; Hartel (yellow card) 45+1'; Hedlund 81'; Kroos (yellow card) 86'	Stadium: Millerntor-Stadion; Attendance: 29,546; Referee: Daniel Schlager (Rastatt)

21 April 2018 31	Union Berlin	1−1	1. FC Heidenheim	Berlin
13:00	Leistner (yellow card) 55'; Redondo 74'	Union Report; Kicker Report; DFL Report	Dovedan 58'; Theuerkauf (yellow card) 90+2'	Stadium: Stadion An der Alten Försterei; Attendance: 21,124; Referee: Benedikt Kempkes (Thür)

28 April 2018 32	SV Darmstadt 98	3−1	Union Berlin	Darmstadt
13:00	Holland 12'; Platte 22', 35'	Union Report; Kicker Report; DFL Report	Fürstner (yellow card) 9'; Trimmel (yellow card) 21'; Redondo (yellow card) 79'; Parensen 87'	Stadium: Merck-Stadion am Böllenfalltor; Attendance: 16,570; Referee: Thorben Siewer (Olpe)

6 May 2018 33	Union Berlin	3−1	VfL Bochum	Berlin
15:30	Daube (yellow card) 35'; Redondo 45', (yellow card) 53'; Danilo 47' (o.g.); Trimmel (yellow card) 51'; Skrzybski 90+1'	Union Report; Kicker Report; DFL Report	Fabian (yellow card) 35'; Losilla (yellow card) 61'; Riemann (yellow card) 81'; Hinterseer 87'	Stadium: Stadion An der Alten Försterei; Attendance: 22,012; Referee: Robert Schröder (Hannover)

13 May 2018 34	Dynamo Dresden	0−1	Union Berlin	Dresden
15:30		Union Report; Kicker Report; DFL Report	Hedlund (yellow card) 44'; Hosiner 82'	Stadium: DDV-Stadion; Attendance: 30,785; Referee: Christian Dingert (Gries

=== DFB-Pokal ===
13 August 2017 R1	1. FC Saarbrücken	1–2 (a.e.t.)	Union Berlin	Saarbrücken
15:30	Zeitz (penalty missed) 29'; Behrens 40'; Jänicke (yellow card) 42'; Kehl-Gómez (yellow card) 95'; Zellner (yellow card) 116'	Union Report; Kicker; DFB Report	Schönheim 23'; Hedlund 101'; Polter (yellow card) 117'	Stadium: Hermann-Neuberger-Stadion; Attendance: 6,936; Referee: Sören Storks (Velen)

24 October 2017 R2	Bayer Leverkusen	4−1	Union Berlin	Leverkusen
18:30	Brandt 36'; Alario 59'; Retsos (yellow card) 65'; Wendell 89' (pen.); Aránguiz 90+2'	Union Report; Kicker Report; DFB Report	Daube 46'; Fürstner (yellow card) 80' (yellow-red card) 90+1'; Gogia (yellow card) 87'; Polter (yellow card) 90'	Stadium: BayArena; Attendance: 24,326; Referee: Frank Willenborg (Osnabrück)

== Squad and statistics ==
As of 13 May 2018

No.	Pos	Player	2. Bundesliga		DFB-Pokal		Total	
No.	Pos	Player	Apps	Goals	Apps	Goals	Apps	Goals
1	GK	(Germany) Daniel Mesenhöler	14	0	2	0	16	0
3	DF	(Austria) Christoph Schößwendter	1+1	0	1	0	3	0
5	DF	(Germany) Marvin Friedrich	11+1	1	0	0	12	1
6	DF	(Denmark) Kristian Pedersen	30+2	1	1	0	33	1
7	MF	(Germany) Marcel Hartel	18+10	2	0+2	0	30	2
8	MF	(Germany) Stephan Fürstner	9+9	0	2	0	20	0
9	FW	(Germany) Sebastian Polter	23+1	12	0+2	0	26	12
10	MF	(Germany) Dennis Daube	8+7	1	1	1	16	2
11	MF	(Germany) Akaki Gogia	17+5	2	0	0	22	2
12	GK	(Denmark) Jakob Busk	20	0	0	0	20	0
13	DF	(Germany) Peter Kurzweg	6+1	1	1+1	0	9	1
15	DF	(Spain) Marc Torrejón	23+1	0	1	0	25	0
16	FW	(Austria) Philipp Hosiner	6+13	2	2	0	21	2
17	FW	(Sweden) Simon Hedlund	29+2	5	2	1	33	6
18	FW	(Germany) Kenny Prince Redondo	3+6	2	0	0	9	2
20	GK	(Germany) Lennart Moser	0	0	0	0	0	0
21	MF	(Germany) Grischa Prömel	18+5	1	1	0	24	1
23	MF	(Germany) Felix Kroos	28+1	1	0+1	0	30	1
24	FW	(Germany) Steven Skrzybski	23+6	14	2	0	31	14
28	DF	(Austria) Christopher Trimmel	32	1	2	0	34	1
29	MF	(Germany) Michael Parensen	7+4	1	1	0	12	1
31	MF	(Germany) Berkan Taz	0	0	0	0	0	0
33	DF	(Germany) Lennard Maloney	1	0	0	0	1	0
34	DF	(Germany) Fabian Schönheim	9+1	0	1	1	11	1
36	MF	(Germany) Cihan Kahraman	0	0	0	0	0	0
37	DF	(Germany) Toni Leistner	28+1	1	0+1	0	30	1
Players transferred out during the season
2	MF	(Japan) Atsuto Uchida	1+1	0	0	0	2	0
19	MF	(Croatia) Damir Kreilach	9+10	2	2	0	21	2
30	GK	(Austria) Michael Gspurning	0	0	0	0	0	0
