= 2016–17 1. FC Union Berlin season =

Union Berlin
2016–17 season
- Manager: Jens Keller
- Stadium: Stadion An der Alten Försterei
- 2. Bundesliga: 4th
- DFB-Pokal: Second round
Home colours	Away colours

The 2016–17 1. FC Union Berlin season was the 51st season in the football club's history. For the 7th consecutive season, Union Berlin played in the 2. Bundesliga. They also participated in this season's edition of the domestic cup, the DFB-Pokal. The season covered a period from 1 July 2016 to 30 June 2017.

== Players ==
=== Squad ===
As of 20 January 2017

Note: Flags indicate national team as defined under FIFA eligibility rules; some limited exceptions apply. Players may hold more than one non-FIFA nationality.

No.	Pos.	Nation	Player
1	GK	GER	Daniel Mesenhöler
3	DF	AUT	Emanuel Pogatetz
4	DF	CRO	Roberto Punčec
5	DF	GER	Benjamin Kessel
6	DF	DEN	Kristian Pedersen
7	MF	GER	Benjamin Köhler
8	MF	GER	Stephan Fürstner
9	FW	GER	Sebastian Polter
10	MF	GER	Dennis Daube
11	MF	GER	Maximilian Thiel
12	GK	DEN	Jakob Busk
13	MF	GER	Raffael Korte
14	MF	SUI	Adrian Nikçi
16	FW	AUT	Philipp Hosiner

No.	Pos.	Nation	Player
17	FW	SWE	Simon Hedlund
18	MF	GER	Kenny Prince Redondo
19	MF	CRO	Damir Kreilach
23	MF	GER	Felix Kroos (Captain)
24	FW	GER	Steven Skrzybski
25	DF	GER	Christopher Lenz
27	MF	KOS	Eroll Zejnullahu
28	DF	AUT	Christopher Trimmel
29	DF	GER	Michael Parensen
30	GK	AUT	Michael Gspurning
34	DF	GER	Fabian Schönheim
37	DF	GER	Toni Leistner
39	MF	GER	Lukas Lämmel

== Competitions ==
Win Draw Loss

=== 2. Bundesliga ===
==== League table ====
Pos	Team	Pld	W	D	L	GF	GA	GD	Pts	Promotion, qualification or relegation
2	Hannover 96 (P)	34	19	10	5	51	32	+19	67	Promotion to Bundesliga
3	Eintracht Braunschweig	34	19	9	6	50	36	+14	66	Qualification for promotion play-offs
4	Union Berlin	34	18	6	10	51	39	+12	60	
5	Dynamo Dresden	34	13	11	10	53	46	+7	50	
6	1. FC Heidenheim	34	12	10	12	43	39	+4	46	

Source: DFB
Rules for classification: 1) Points; 2) Goal difference; 3) Goals scored
(P) Promoted

==== Results summary ====
Overall								Home						Away					
Pld	W	D	L	GF	GA	GD	Pts	W	D	L	GF	GA	GD	W	D	L	GF	GA	GD
34	18	6	10	51	39	+12	60	11	3	3	29	12	+17	7	3	7	22	27	−5

Last updated: 21 May 2017.
Source: kicker

==== Results by round ====
Round	1	2	3	4	5	6	7	8	9	10	11	12	13	14	15	16	17	18	19	20	21	22	23	24	25	26	27	28	29	30	31	32	33	34
Ground	A	H	A	H	A	A	H	A	H	A	H	A	H	A	H	A	H	H	A	H	A	H	H	A	H	A	H	A	H	A	H	A	H	A
Result	L	D	D	W	W	W	W	L	W	W	L	L	D	W	W	L	D	W	D	W	W	W	W	W	W	L	L	D	W	L	W	L	L	W
Position	17	15	15	12	9	6	3	5	3	3	3	3	5	3	3	3	3	1	1	1	1	1	1	1	1	3	3	3	3	4	4	4	4	4

Updated to match(es) played on 21 May 2017. Source:
A = Away; H = Home; W = Win; D = Draw; L = Loss

==== Matches ====
6 August 2016 1	VfL Bochum	2–1	Union Berlin	Bochum
13:00 CET	Bastians 57'; Weilandt 77'; Wurtz (yellow card) 90'	Report	Schönheim (yellow card) 39'; Kreilach (yellow card) 42' (goal) 72'	Stadium: Vonovia Ruhrstadion; Attendance: 17,118; Referee: Robert Kampka

15 August 2016 2	Union Berlin	2–2	Dynamo Dresden	Berlin
20:15 CET	Redondo (yellow card) 15'; Fürstner (yellow card) 27'; Quaner 58' 66'	Report	Aosman 8' (yellow card) 48'; Lambertz 69'; Berko (yellow card) 70'	Stadium: Stadion An der Alten Försterei; Attendance: 22,012; Referee: Wolfgang Stark

28 August 2016 3	Arminia Bielefeld	4–4	Union Berlin	Bielefeld
13:30 CET	Schuppan 30'; Klos 42' (yellow card) 75'; Nöthe 63'; Ulm 84'	Report	Fürstner (yellow card) 29' (goal) 37'; Punčec (yellow card) 34'; Skrzybski 66' 81'; Quaner 68'; Kroos (yellow card) 90+1'	Stadium: SchücoArena; Attendance: 13,604; Referee: Timo Gerach

10 September 2016 4	Union Berlin	4–0	Karlsruher SC	Berlin
13:00 CET	Leistner (yellow card) 12'; Kreilach 22'; Quaner 44' 76'; Skrzybski 60' (pen.)	Report	Kinsombi (yellow card) 6'; Sallahi (yellow card) 32'; Vollath (yellow card) 60'	Stadium: Stadion An der Alten Försterei; Attendance: 19,356; Referee: Aarne Aarink

16 September 2016 5	TSV 1860 Munich	1–2	Union Berlin	Munich
18:30 CET	Liendl 25' (pen.); Përdedaj (yellow card) 41'; Adlung (yellow card) 65'; Wittek (yellow card) 83'	Report	Skrzybski 5'; Schönheim (yellow card) 25' (yellow-red card); Redondo 40'; Kroos (yellow card) 63'; Busk (yellow card) 72'	Stadium: Allianz Arena; Attendance: 19,300; Referee: Florian Heft

21 September 2016 6	Würzburger Kickers	0–1	Union Berlin	Würzburg
17:30 CET	Kurzweg (yellow card) 90+4'	Report	Quaner 84'	Stadium: flyeralarm Arena; Attendance: 10,148; Referee: Matthias Jöllenbeck

26 September 2016 7	Union Berlin	2–0	FC St. Pauli	Berlin
20:15 CET	Hosiner 12'; Redondo 42'	Report	Ziereis (yellow card) 65'; Sobota (yellow card) 90'	Stadium: Stadion An der Alten Försterei; Attendance: 22,012; Referee: Harm Osmers

30 September 2016 8	Nürnberg	2–0	Union Berlin	Nuremberg
18:30 CET	Salli (yellow card) 26' (yellow-red card); Möhwald 45+1'; Teuchert 83'; Brečko (yellow card) 85'	Report	Pedersen (yellow card) 24' (yellow-red card); Punčec (yellow card) 72'; Leistner (yellow card) 90+1'	Stadium: Stadion Nürnberg; Attendance: 24,465; Referee: Daniel Schlager

16 October 2016 9	Union Berlin	2–1	Hannover 96	Berlin
13:30 CET	Kreilach (yellow card) 10'; Trimmel (yellow card) 27'; Parensen (yellow card) 44'; Quaner 75'; Hosiner 79'; Fürstner (yellow card) 89'	Report	Anton (yellow card) 12'; Karaman (yellow card) 17'; Klaus 90+6' (yellow card) 90+8'	Stadium: Stadion An der Alten Försterei; Attendance: 22,012; Referee: Robert Hartmann

23 October 2016 10	Erzgebirge Aue	1–3	Union Berlin	Aue
13:30 CET	Kvesić 20'; Riedel (yellow card) 41'	Report	Leistner (yellow card) 11'; Kreilach 41' 63'; Skrzybski 82'	Stadium: Sparkassen-Erzgebirgsstadion; Attendance: 10,000; Referee: Benjamin Brand

29 October 2016 11	Union Berlin	0–1	Fortuna Düsseldorf	Berlin
13:00 CET	Hedlund (yellow card) 65'; Hosiner (yellow card) 71'	Report	Ayhan (yellow card) 50' (yellow-red card); Kiesewetter (yellow card) 54'; Bebou 56'; Bellinghausen (yellow card) 57'; Bodzek (yellow card) 69'	Stadium: Stadion An der Alten Försterei; Attendance: 21,195; Referee: Patrick Alt

5 November 2016 12	1. FC Kaiserslautern	1–0	Union Berlin	Kaiserslautern
13:00 CET	Aliji (yellow card) 23'; Gaus 71'; Mwene (yellow card) 80'; Ziegler (yellow card) 86'	Report		Stadium: Fritz-Walter-Stadion; Attendance: 21,446; Referee: Sören Storks

20 November 2016 13	Union Berlin	1–1	Stuttgart	Berlin
13:30 CET	Daube (yellow card) 31'; Skrzybski 60'; Fürstner (yellow card) 88'	Report	Terodde 3'; Kamiński (yellow card) 38'	Stadium: Stadion An der Alten Försterei; Attendance: 22,012; Referee: Deniz Aytekin

27 November 2016 14	Sandhausen	0–1	Union Berlin	Sandhausen
13:30 CET	Pledl (yellow card) 76'	Report	Kroos 12' (yellow card) 73'; Trimmel (yellow card) 32'; Daube (yellow card) 45'	Stadium: Hardtwaldstadion; Attendance: 5,185; Referee: Alexander Sather

5 December 2016 15	Union Berlin	2–0	Eintracht Braunschweig	Berlin
20:15 CET	Hedlund 56'; Leistner (yellow card) 80'; Daube 82'	Report	Moll (yellow card) 60'	Stadium: Stadion An der Alten Försterei; Attendance: 20,312; Referee: Christian Dingert

9 December 2016 16	Heidenheim	3–0	Union Berlin	Heidenheim an der Brenz
18:30 CET	Kleindienst 34'; Schnatterer 58' (pen.); Beermann (yellow card) 74'; Halloran 90+2'	Report	Brandy (yellow card) 81'	Stadium: Voith-Arena; Attendance: 12,300; Referee: Robert Schröder

11 December 2016 17	Union Berlin	1–1	Greuther Fürth	Berlin
13:30 CET	Kroos (yellow card) 62'; Leistner 65'; Fürstner (yellow card) 90+1'	Report	Dursun 80'	Stadium: Stadion An der Alten Försterei; Attendance: 19,228; Referee: Bibiana Steinhaus

27 January 2017 18	Union Berlin	2–1	VfL Bochum	Berlin
18:30 CET	Punčec (yellow card) 42'; Polter 67'; Skrzybski 80'; Trimmel (yellow card) 83'; Kreilach 90'	Report	Fabian (yellow card) 38'; Hoogland 40'; Wurtz (yellow card) 69'; Quaschner (yellow card) 87'	Stadium: Stadion An der Alten Försterei; Attendance: 19,130; Referee: Patrick Ittrich

5 February 2017 19	Dynamo Dresden	0–0	Union Berlin	Dresden
13:30 CET		Report		Stadium: Rudolf-Harbig-Stadion; Attendance: 30,153; Referee: Benjamin Brand

12 February 2017 20	Union Berlin	3–1	Arminia Bielefeld	Berlin
13:30 CET	Kroos 22'; Kreilach 63'; Polter 83'	Report	Klos 44'	Stadium: Stadion An der Alten Försterei; Attendance: 20,258; Referee: Martin Petersen

19 February 2017 21	Karlsruher SC	1–2	Union Berlin	Karlsruhe
13:30 CET	Stoppelkamp 77' (pen.)	Report	Hedlund 6' (pen.); Kinsombi 37' (o.g.)	Stadium: Wildparkstadion; Attendance: 13,531; Referee: Thorben Siewer

24 February 2017 22	Union Berlin	2–0	1860 Munich	Berlin
		Report		Stadium: Stadion An der Alten Försterei

3 March 2017 23	Union Berlin	2–0	Würzburger Kickers	Berlin
		Report		Stadium: Stadion An der Alten Försterei

10 March 2017 24	FC St. Pauli	1–2	Union Berlin	Hamburg
		Report		Stadium: Millerntor-Stadion

20 March 2017 25	Union Berlin	1–0	1. FC Nürnberg	Berlin
		Report		Stadium: Stadion An der Alten Försterei

1 April 2017 26	Hannover 96	2–0	Union Berlin	Hanover
		Report		Stadium: Niedersachsenstadion

5 April 2017 27	Union Berlin	0–1	Erzgebirge Aue	Berlin
		Report		Stadium: Stadion An der Alten Försterei

9 April 2017 28	Fortuna Düsseldorf	2–2	Union Berlin	Düsseldorf
		Report		Stadium: Düsseldorf Arena

16 April 2017 29	Union Berlin	3–1	1. FC Kaiserslautern	Berlin
		Report		Stadium: Stadion An der Alten Försterei

24 April 2017 30	VfB Stuttgart	3–1	Union Berlin	Stuttgart
		Report		Stadium: Mercedes-Benz Arena

28 April 2017 31	Union Berlin	2–1	SV Sandhausen	Berlin
		Report		Stadium: Stadion An der Alten Försterei

8 May 2017 32	Eintracht Braunschweig	3–1	Union Berlin	Braunschweig
		Report		Stadium: Eintracht-Stadion

14 May 2017 33	Union Berlin	0–1	1. FC Heidenheim	Berlin
		Report		Stadium: Stadion An der Alten Försterei

21 May 2017 34	SpVgg Greuther Fürth	1–2	Union Berlin	Fürth
		Report		Stadium: Sportpark Ronhof Thomas Sommer

=== DFB-Pokal ===
21 August 2016 First round	MSV Duisburg	1–2 (a.e.t.)	Union Berlin	Duisburg
15:30	Iljutcenko 67'; Wiegel (yellow card) 97'; Albutat (yellow card) 110'	Report	Quaner 62'; Schnellhardt 95' (o.g.); Pedersen (yellow card) 114'	Stadium: Schauinsland-Reisen-Arena; Attendance: 14,209; Referee: (Germany) Marco Fritz

26 October 2016 Second round	Borussia Dortmund	1–1 (a.e.t.) (3–0 p)	Union Berlin	Dortmund
21:00	Parensen 44' (o.g.)	Report	Parensen (yellow card) 55'; Punčec (yellow card) 77'; Skrzybski 81'; Fürstner (yellow card) 91'; Trimmel (yellow card) 98'	Stadium: SIGNAL IDUNA PARK; Attendance: 79,037; Referee: Jochen Drees
	Penalties
	Dembélé (penalty scored); Ginter (penalty scored); Götze (penalty scored)		(penalty missed) Kroos; (penalty missed) Fürstner; (penalty missed) Hosiner
