= Kenny Prince Redondo =

German footballer (born 1994)

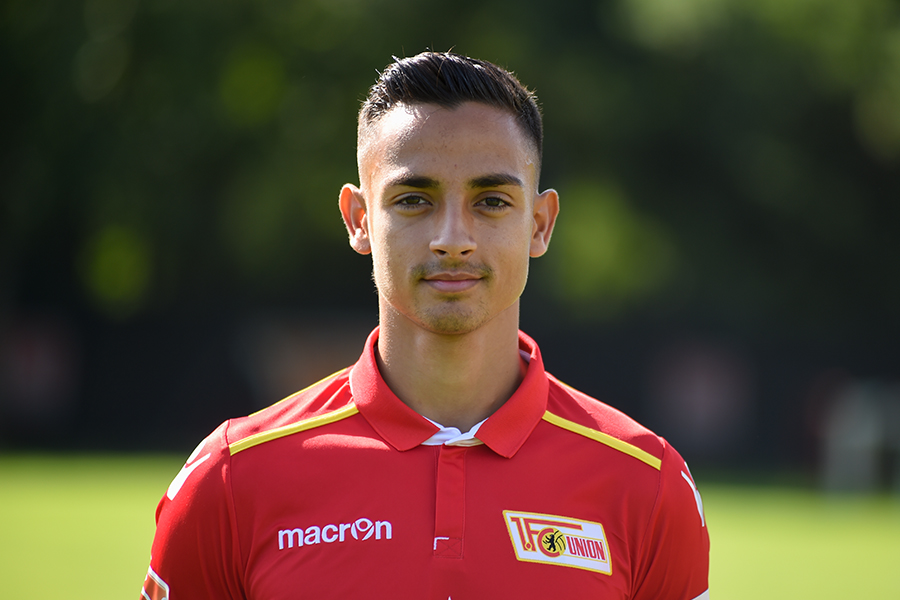
- Redondo with Union Berlin in 2016

Personal information
- Date of birth: 29 August 1994 (age 32)
- Place of birth: Munich, Germany
- Height: 1.82 m (6 ft 0 in)
- Position: Midfielder

Youth career
- –2007: Rot-Weiss Oberföhring
- 2008–2013: SpVgg Unterhaching

Senior career*
Years	Team	Apps	(Gls)
2013–2015	SpVgg Unterhaching	33	(3)
2014–2015	SpVgg Unterhaching II	2	(0)
2015–2019	Union Berlin	68	(6)
2019–2020	Greuther Fürth	30	(1)
2020–2026	1. FC Kaiserslautern	153	(16)
- * Club domestic league appearances and goals as of 18 May 2026

Kenny Prince Redondo (born 29 August 1994) is an Ethiopian professional footballer who plays as a midfielder.

== Career ==
=== Youth career ===
Redondo was with Rot-Weiss Oberföhring until 31 December 2007. At this point he transferred to SpVgg Unterhaching. He was with the youth teams until 2012–13 season.

=== SpVgg Unterhaching ===
Redondo made his professional debut in the 2013–14 season when he came into a 4–0 loss to Jahn Regensburg. The following season, he played for both the first team and reserve team. He scored two goals in 25 appearances in the 3. Liga, and for the reserve team, he made two appearances without scoring any goals in the Bayernliga.

=== Union Berlin ===
On 27 May 2015, Redondo signed for Union Berlin. He played in the first round of the German Cup against Viktoria Köln on 8 August 2015 and made his first 2. Bundesliga appearance on matchday six in a 3–0 win against Karlsruher SC. During the 2016–17 season, Redondo scored four goals in 33 matches played in the league. He also played in two German Cup matches. During the 2017–18 season, Redondo scored two goals in eight matches.

=== 1. FC Kaiserslautern ===
Redondo joined 3. Liga club 1. FC Kaiserslautern on a free transfer on 5 October 2020, the last day of the 2020 summer transfer window.

== Personal life ==
Redondo was born in Germany to an Ethiopian father, and a Spanish mother.

== Career statistics ==
As of 25 May 2024

Appearances and goals by club, season and competition
Club	Season	League			Cup^{1}		Other		Total		Ref.
Club	Season	League	Apps	Goals	Apps	Goals	Apps	Goals			Ref.
SpVgg Unterhaching	2013–14	3. Liga	8	1	—		—		8	1	
SpVgg Unterhaching	2014–15	3. Liga	25	2	—		—		25	2	
SpVgg Unterhaching	Total		33	3	—		—		33	3	—
SpVgg Unterhaching II	2014–15	Bayernliga	2	0	—		—		2	0	
Union Berlin	2015–16	2. Bundesliga	19	0	1	0	—		20	0	
Union Berlin	2016–17	2. Bundesliga	33	4	2	0	—		35	4	
Union Berlin	2017–18	2. Bundesliga	9	2	0	0	—		9	2	
Union Berlin	2018–19	2. Bundesliga	7	0	2	0	—		9	0	
Union Berlin	Total		68	6	5	0	—		73	6	—
Greuther Fürth	2018–19	2. Bundesliga	16	0	0	0	—		16	0	
Greuther Fürth	2019–20	2. Bundesliga	14	1	1	0	—		15	1	
Greuther Fürth	Total		30	1	1	0	—		31	1	—
1. FC Kaiserslautern	2020–21	3. Liga	31	5	0	0	—		31	5	
1. FC Kaiserslautern	2021–22	3. Liga	31	2	1	0	2^{2}	0	34	2	
1. FC Kaiserslautern	2022–23	2. Bundesliga	28	5	1	0	—		29	5	
1. FC Kaiserslautern	2023–24	2. Bundesliga	29	2	5	2	—		34	4	
1. FC Kaiserslautern	Total		119	14	7	2	2	0	128	16	—
Career total			252	21	13	2	2	0	267	23	—

- 1.Includes German Cup.
- 2.Includes promotional playoff.
