= Simon Hedlund =

Swedish footballer (born 1993)

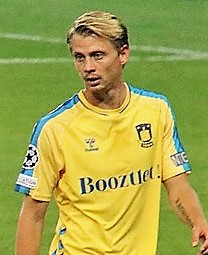
- Hedlund in 2021

Personal information
- Full name: Simon Fredrik Hedlund
- Date of birth: 11 March 1993 (age 33)
- Place of birth: Trollhättan, Sweden
- Height: 1.73 m (5 ft 8 in)
- Position: Winger

Team information
- Current team: Elfsborg
- Number: 15

Youth career
- IFK Trollhättan
- –2009: FC Trollhättan
- 2009–2012: Elfsborg

Senior career*
Years	Team	Apps	(Gls)
2012–2016	Elfsborg	93	(14)
2016–2019	Union Berlin	70	(8)
2019–2023	Brøndby	133	(23)
2023–	Elfsborg	75	(12)

International career^{‡}
2008–2010	Sweden U17	18	(1)
2010–2012	Sweden U19	9	(0)
2013	Sweden U21	2	(0)
2020	Sweden	2	(1)
- * Club domestic league appearances and goals as of 8 July 2026 ‡ National team caps and goals as of 00:44, 17 January 2022 (UTC)

Simon Fredrik Hedlund (Swedish pronunciation: [ˈhêːdlɵnd]; born 11 March 1993) is a Swedish professional footballer who plays as a forward for Allsvenskan club Elfsborg.

Hedlund joined IF Elfsborg at the age of 16 and debuted in the Allsvenskan in 2012. In 2016, he moved to Union Berlin for a club record €850,000 before signing for Brøndby IF for €250,000 two and a half years later, in January 2019. In Denmark, he developed a strong partnership in attack first with top goalscorer Kamil Wilczek and later with Mikael Uhre and became noted for his pace and pressing abilities. He returned to Elfsborg in 2023, after seven years abroad.

Hedlund has represented Sweden at different youth levels and made his under-21 debut in 2012. He was called up to the senior team in 2020, and scored his first goal for the national team in his second appearance.

== Club career ==
=== Elfsborg ===
Born in Trollhättan, Västra Götaland County, Hedlund joined the youth system of IF Elfsborg when he was 16 years old, after having played for hometown clubs IFK Trollhättan and FC Trollhättan. There, he made his professional debut on 12 August 2012 in a 4–1 league win over Malmö FF, coming on as a late substitute for Niklas Hult. At the end of the season, Elfsborg won the Swedish league title. He was also a part of the Elfsborg team that won the Swedish Cup in 2014. On 31 July 2014, Hedlund made his first goal in European competition, scoring on a penalty kick in the 89th minute in a 4–1 win over Icelandic club FH in the third qualifying round of the Europa League.

During his time in Elfsborg, Hedlund made 93 league appearances in which he scored 14 goals. He also scored nine goals in 20 appearances in the Swedish Cup and made 17 total appearances in the Champions League and UEFA Europa League.

=== Union Berlin ===
On 29 August 2016, Hedlund signed a four-year contract with 2. Bundesliga club, 1. FC Union Berlin. The transfer made him the most expensive purchase by the club at the time. Hedlund made his debut on 21 September, as a substitute in an away game against Würzburger Kickers which Union won 1–0. He finished the 2016–17 season with 29 appearances in which he scored three goals.

Hedlund missed just three league matches during the 2017–18 season as Union finished eighth in the league. However, the following season he saw less playing time, as Union would eventually push for promotion to the Bundesliga just months after he left the club. Hedlund departed the Stadion An der Alten Försterei in January 2019, after making 75 appearances and scoring 11 goals for the club.

=== Brøndby ===
On 11 January 2019, Hedlund moved to Denmark to join Superliga club Brøndby IF on a four-and-a-half-year contract for a fee rumoured to be around €250,000. He was assigned shirt number 27 by the club. Hedlund scored his first goal for the club in a 2–2 home draw against OB on 29 March. He made the final of the Danish Cup in his first six months in Brøndby, a match against FC Midtjylland which was eventually lost on penalties. Hedlund finished the 2018–19 season with four goals from 19 appearances. On 30 June 2020, Hedlund and teammate Samuel Mráz tested positive for COVID-19, ruling them out for at least a week.

Before a match against FC Midtjylland on 24 October 2020, Hedlund was not selected for the matchday squad, giving rise to speculation to about the reasons. Brøndby head coach Niels Frederiksen explained that other players had impressed more during practice, and that the decision of not including Hedlund was "not a disciplinary punishment". He would, however, finish the season strong as a key part of the Brøndby offense alongside top goalscorer Mikael Uhre and Jesper Lindstrøm as the club won its first Danish Superliga in 16 years. Hedlund contributed with nine goals and nine assists in 33 appearances in the club's title-winning season, and was voted Superliga Player of the Month for May 2021 for his performances.

On 3 March 2023, Hedlund extended his contract with Brøndby by two years until 2025.

=== Return to Elfsborg ===
On 20 August 2023, Hedlund returned to Elfsborg, signing a three-and-a-half-year contract with Di Gule. He made his return debut for the club on 3 September, replacing André Boman at half-time in a 1–0 league loss away against IFK Värnamo. On 8 October, he scored his first return goal for Elfsborg, as well as providing an assist, strongly contributing to a 3–0 league victory against Brommapojkarna. On 22 June 2026, Hedlund extended his contract with Elfsborg for two more years.

== International career ==
Hedlund has represented Sweden as an international at various youth levels. On 9 January 2020, Hedlund made his debut for the Sweden national team in a friendly against Moldova, a match that ended in a 1–0 win for Sweden. In his second match, a 1–0 win over Kosovo on 12 January, Hedlund scored his first international goal, which secured the win for Sweden.

== Style of play ==
Hedlund has been described as a player with an "aggressive and direct playing style", who can play in multiple offensive positions. Renowned for his pace with and without the ball at his feet, Hedlund has described himself as a "hard worker", and was praised for evolving into a true team-player during his time at Brøndby by head coach Niels Frederiksen.

== Personal life ==
Hedlund is of Finnish descent through his Finnish mother. In June 2020, Hedlund married longtime girlfriend, Sandra Isabel, in Sweden.

== Career statistics ==
=== Club ===
As of match played 8 July 2026

Appearances and goals by club, season and competition
Club	League	Season	League		National cup (Note: Includes Svenska Cupen, DFB-Pokal, Danish Cup)		Europe		Other		Total	
Club	League	Season	Apps	Goals	Apps	Goals	Apps	Goals	Apps	Goals	Apps	Goals
Elfsborg	2012	Allsvenskan	7	0	0	0	1 (Note: Appearances in UEFA Europa League)	0	—		8	0
Elfsborg	2013	Allsvenskan	16	2	4	2	6 (Note: Two appearances in UEFA Champions League, four appearances in UEFA Europa League)	0	—		26	4
Elfsborg	2014	Allsvenskan	27	1	7	2	4	1	1 (Note: Appearance in the Swedish Super Cup)	0	39	4
Elfsborg	2015	Allsvenskan	26	6	5	4	6	0	—		35	11
Elfsborg	2016	Allsvenskan	17	5	4	1	0	0	—		28	6
Elfsborg	Total		93	14	20	9	17	1	1	0	135	25
Union Berlin	2016–17	2. Bundesliga	28	3	1	0	—		—		29	3
Union Berlin	2017–18	2. Bundesliga	31	5	2	1	—		—		33	6
Union Berlin	2018–19	2. Bundesliga	11	0	2	2	—		—		13	2
Union Berlin	Total		70	8	5	3	0	0	0	0	75	11
Brøndby	2018–19	Superliga	16	4	3	0	—		0	0	19	4
Brøndby	2019–20	Superliga	31	5	2	0	6	1	—		39	6
Brøndby	2020–21	Superliga	31	8	2	1	—		—		33	9
Brøndby	2021–22	Superliga	29	4	2	0	8 (Note: Two appearances in UEFA Champions League, six appearances in UEFA Europa League)	0	—		38	4
Brøndby	2022–23	Superliga	25	2	0	0	4 (Note: Appearances in UEFA Europa Conference League)	2	—		29	4
Brøndby	2023–24	Superliga	1	0	0	0	—		—		1	0
Brøndby	Total		133	23	9	1	18	3	0	0	160	27
Elfsborg	2023	Allsvenskan	8	1	0	0	—		—		8	1
Elfsborg	2024	Allsvenskan	29	7	3	2	16	2	—		48	11
Elfsborg	2025	Allsvenskan	27	4	4	0	—		—		31	4
Elfsborg	2026	Allsvenskan	11	0	0	0	—		—		11	0
Elfsborg	Total		75	12	7	2	16	2	0	0	98	16
Career total			371	57	37	15	51	6	1	0	464	79

=== International ===
As of 15 February 2020

Appearances and goals by national team and year
National team	Year	Apps	Goals
Sweden	2020	2	1
Total		2	1

As of matches played 12 January 2020
Scores and results list Sweden's goal tally first, score column indicates score after each Hedlund goal.

List of international goals scored by Simon Hedlund
No.	Date	Venue	Opponent	Score	Result	Competition
1	12 January 2020	Hamad bin Khalifa Stadium, Doha, Qatar	Kosovo	1–0	1–0	Friendly

== Honours ==
Elfsborg

- Allsvenskan: 2012
- Svenska Cupen: 2013–14

Brøndby

- Danish Superliga: 2020–21

Individual

- Brøndby Player of the Month: February 2019, March 2019
- Superliga Player of the Month: May 2021
