= Christopher Trimmel =

Austrian footballer

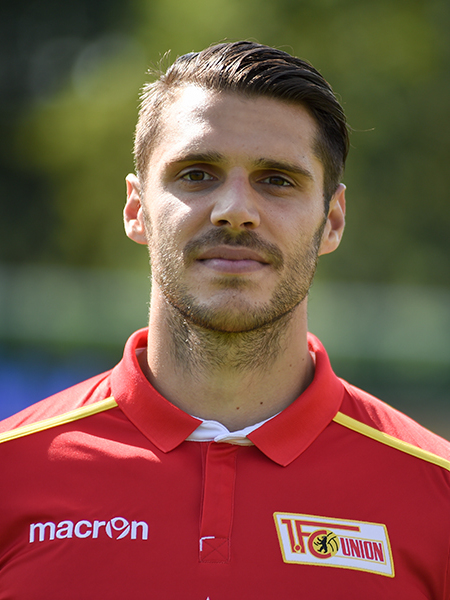
- Trimmel with Union Berlin in 2016

Personal information
- Full name: Christopher Trimmel
- Date of birth: 24 February 1987 (age 39)
- Place of birth: Oberpullendorf, Austria
- Height: 1.89 m (6 ft 2 in)
- Positions: Right-back; wing-back

Team information
- Current team: Union Berlin
- Number: 28

Youth career
- 1994–2006: UFC Mannersdorf
- 2006–2007: ASK Horitschon

Senior career*
Years	Team	Apps	(Gls)
2007–2008	ASK Horitschon	15	(7)
2008–2014	Rapid Wien	149	(18)
2014–	Union Berlin	350	(5)

International career
2009–2022	Austria	25	(1)
- * Club domestic league appearances and goals as of 1 November 2026

Christopher Trimmel (born 24 February 1987) is an Austrian professional footballer who plays as a right-back or right wing-back for and captains Bundesliga club Union Berlin.

== Club career ==
Born in Oberpullendorf, Trimmel started his career at local club USC Mannersdorf. He switched to ASK Horitschon, where he played for two seasons until he was discovered by Rapid Wien.

Trimmel signed with Rapid in 2008, and initially played for the amateurs, but quickly managed to receive a place in the first-team squad. On 2 August 2009, in his sixth league game, he scored a hat-trick in only six minutes in a 5–1 victory over Austria Kärnten.

In February 2014, Trimmel signed with Union Berlin for the new season. In May 2017, he extended his contract until 2019.

On 24 October 2023, Trimmel made his debut in the UEFA Champions League against Napoli at the age of 36 years and 240 days, becoming the oldest Austrian debutant in the UEFA CL. The record was previously held by Michael Konsel, who was 34 years and 189 days old when he made his debut for Rapid in 1996.

In April 2025, he extended his contract with the club after surpassing 350 appearances, solidifying his status as the most-capped player in the club's history.

== International career ==
On 5 August 2009, it was announced that Trimmel was a part of the national team squad for the upcoming friendly match against Cameroon. He has since represented the national team 22 times, after a nine-year hiatus in 2019 again. In May 2021, he was named in Austria's 26-man squad for the UEFA Euro 2020 tournament.

== Career statistics ==
=== Club ===
As of match played 1 November 2026

Appearances and goals by club, season and competition
Club	Season	League			National cup (Note: Includes Austrian Cup, DFB-Pokal)		Europe		Other		Total	
Club	Season	Division	Apps	Goals	Apps	Goals	Apps	Goals	Apps	Goals	Apps	Goals
Rapid Wien	2008–09	Austrian Bundesliga	5	0	0	0	0	0	—		5	0
Rapid Wien	2009–10	Austrian Bundesliga	24	5	3	1	8 (Note: Appearances in UEFA Europa League)	2	—		35	8
Rapid Wien	2010–11	Austrian Bundesliga	28	1	4	0	10	2	—		42	3
Rapid Wien	2011–12	Austrian Bundesliga	27	4	1	0	—		—		28	4
Rapid Wien	2012–13	Austrian Bundesliga	31	4	4	0	9	0	—		44	4
Rapid Wien	2013–14	Austrian Bundesliga	34	4	1	0	10	1	—		45	5
Rapid Wien	Total		149	18	13	1	37	5	—		199	24
Union Berlin	2014–15	2. Bundesliga	29	0	1	0	—		—		30	0
Union Berlin	2015–16	2. Bundesliga	26	1	1	0	—		—		27	1
Union Berlin	2016–17	2. Bundesliga	33	0	2	0	—		—		35	0
Union Berlin	2017–18	2. Bundesliga	32	1	2	0	—		—		34	1
Union Berlin	2018–19	2. Bundesliga	32	0	2	0	—		1 (Note: Appearance in Bundesliga relegation play-offs)	0	35	0
Union Berlin	2019–20	Bundesliga	32	0	3	0	—		—		35	0
Union Berlin	2020–21	Bundesliga	31	1	2	0	—		—		33	1
Union Berlin	2021–22	Bundesliga	25	2	5	0	7 (Note: Appearances in UEFA Europa Conference League)	1	—		37	3
Union Berlin	2022–23	Bundesliga	25	0	2	0	9	0	—		36	0
Union Berlin	2023–24	Bundesliga	26	0	2	0	3 (Note: Appearances in UEFA Champions League)	0	—		31	0
Union Berlin	2024–25	Bundesliga	25	0	1	0	—		—		26	0
Union Berlin	2025–26	Bundesliga	29	0	2	0	—		—		31	0
Union Berlin	2026–27	Bundesliga	5	0	1	0	—		—		6	0
Union Berlin	Total		350	5	24	0	19	1	1	0	394	6
Career total			500	23	38	1	56	5	1	0	595	30

=== International ===
As of match played 25 September 2022

Appearances and goals by national team and year
National team	Year	Apps	Goals
Austria	2009	2	0
Austria	2010	1	0
Austria	2019	4	0
Austria	2020	3	0
Austria	2021	10	1
Austria	2022	5	0
Total		25	1

Scores and results list Austria's goal tally first.

No	Date	Venue	Opponent	Score	Result	Competition
1.	15 November 2021	Wörthersee Stadion, Klagenfurt, Austria	Moldova	2–0	4–1	2022 World Cup qualifier
