= Sebastian Polter =

German footballer (born 1991)

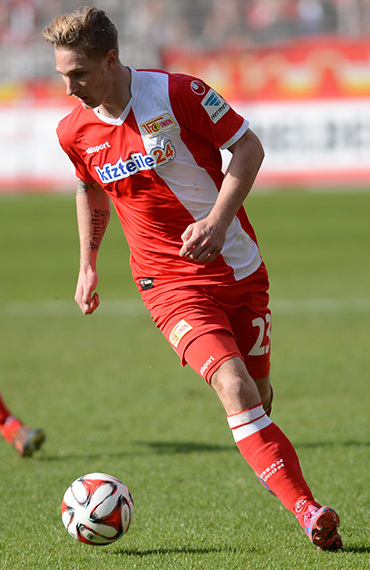
- Polter playing for Union Berlin in 2015

Personal information
- Date of birth: 1 April 1991 (age 35)
- Place of birth: Wilhelmshaven, Germany
- Height: 1.92 m (6 ft 4 in)
- Position: Striker

Youth career
- 1994–2003: Heidmühler FC
- 2003–2004: SV Wilhelmshaven
- 2004–2005: Werder Bremen
- 2005–2006: SV Wilhelmshaven
- 2006–2007: Eintracht Braunschweig
- 2007–2010: VfL Wolfsburg

Senior career*
Years	Team	Apps	(Gls)
2008–2012	VfL Wolfsburg II	68	(19)
2011–2013	VfL Wolfsburg	12	(2)
2012–2013	→ 1. FC Nürnberg (loan)	26	(5)
2012–2013	→ 1. FC Nürnberg II (loan)	2	(1)
2013–2015	Mainz 05	13	(0)
2013–2014	Mainz 05 II	7	(3)
2014–2015	→ Union Berlin (loan)	29	(14)
2015–2017	Queens Park Rangers	51	(10)
2017–2020	Union Berlin	72	(30)
2020–2021	Fortuna Sittard	32	(9)
2021–2022	VfL Bochum	33	(10)
2022–2024	Schalke 04	31	(5)
2024	→ Darmstadt 98 (loan)	9	(0)
2024–2026	Eintracht Braunschweig	37	(3)
2025	Eintracht Braunschweig II	1	(1)
2026	Partizan	17	(2)

International career
2008–2009	Germany U18	6	(3)
2012	Germany U20	1	(2)
2012–2013	Germany U21	10	(4)
- * Club domestic league appearances and goals as of 23 May 2026

Sebastian Polter (born 1 April 1991) is a German professional footballer who plays as a striker.

== Club career ==
=== Early career ===
Polter played for VfL Wolfsburg II from July 2008 until June 2012. During the 2008–09 season, Polter made 10 appearances without scoring a goal. During the 2009–10 season, Polter scored three goals in 15 appearances. During the 2010–11 season, Polter scored 11 goals in 25 appearances. He played for both the first team and reserve team during the 2011–12 season. He scored two goals in 12 appearances for the first team and five goals in 18 appearances for the reserve team.

Polter played for 1. FC Nürnberg between July 2012 and June 2013 and for the reserve team in April 2013. He scored five goals in 27 appearances for the first team and a goal in two appearances for the reserve team.

Polter played for 1. FSV Mainz 05 between July 2013 and August 2014 and 1. FSV Mainz 05 II between September 2013 and June 2014. For the first team, he played in 15 matches without scoring a goal, and for the reserve team, he scored three goals in seven appearances.

In late August 2014, he was loaned to 2. Bundesliga club Union Berlin for the season. He scored 14 goals in 29 appearances.

=== Queens Park Rangers ===
In July 2015 it was announced that Queens Park Rangers had signed Polter from FSV Mainz 05 on a three-year deal for an undisclosed fee. Polter made an instant impact on his debut scoring QPR's third goal in their 10–0 win over Italian side Verona Stars in the club's first pre-season fixture of the summer. Polter's league debut came in a 2–0 away loss to London rivals Charlton Athletic as he came on as a sub for Charlie Austin in the 84th minute. His full debut came in a League Cup match against Yeovil Town, he scored the first goal for QPR as they secured a comfortable 3–0 victory. He finished the 2015–16 season with seven goals in 33 appearances. During the 2016–17 season for Queens Park Rangers, he scored 12 goals in 23 appearances.

=== Union Berlin ===
He rejoined Union Berlin on 10 January 2017. During the 2016–17 season for Union Berlin, he scored seven goals in 15 appearances. He finished the 2017–18 season with 12 goals in 26 appearances.

On 28 May 2020, Union Berlin president Dirk Zingler announced in a statement that Polter would not play for the club until the end of his contract in June, stating that Polter was the only member of the club that did not "stand up for each other and for our club," during the COVID-19 pandemic. He had, as the sole member of the first team, refused to take a pay cut as the club was struggling financially due to the effects of the pandemic.

=== Fortuna Sittard ===
Polter signed a two-year contract with Dutch Eredivisie club Fortuna Sittard on 17 August 2020.

=== VfL Bochum ===
On 13 August 2021, VfL Bochum signed Polter on a free transfer until 30 June 2023.

=== Schalke 04 ===
On 20 June 2022, Polter signed a three-year contract with Schalke 04, which promoted to the Bundesliga. On 22 August 2024, his contract with Schalke was mutually terminated.

==== Loan to Darmstadt 98 ====
On 1 February 2024, Polter was loaned to Bundesliga club Darmstadt 98 until the end of the season.

=== Eintracht Braunschweig ===
On 29 August 2024, Polter joined Eintracht Braunschweig on a two-year contract.

=== Partizan ===
On 18 January 2026, Polter signed with Partizan in Serbia.

== International career ==
Polter was a member of several German youth national teams and also appointed to the squad for 2013 UEFA European Under-21 Championship in Israel where Germany were eliminated at the group stage.

== Career statistics ==
As of match played 23 May 2026

Appearances and goals by club, season and competition
Club	Season	League			Cup (Note: Appearances in DFB-Pokal and KNVB Cup.)		League Cup		Other		Total	
Club	Season	Division	Apps	Goals	Apps	Goals	Apps	Goals	Apps	Goals	Apps	Goals
VfL Wolfsburg II	2008–09	Regionalliga Nord	10	0	—		—		—		10	0
VfL Wolfsburg II	2009–10	Regionalliga Nord	15	3	—		—		—		15	3
VfL Wolfsburg II	2010–11	Regionalliga Nord	25	11	—		—		—		25	11
VfL Wolfsburg II	2011–12	Regionalliga Nord	18	5	—		—		—		18	5
VfL Wolfsburg II	Total		68	19	—		—		—		68	19
VfL Wolfsburg	2011–12	Bundesliga	12	2	0	0	—		—		12	2
1. FC Nürnberg (loan)	2012–13	Bundesliga	26	5	1	0	—		—		27	5
1. FC Nürnberg II (loan)	2012–13	Regionalliga Bayern	2	1	—		—		—		2	1
Mainz 05	2013–14	Bundesliga	13	0	2	0	—		—		15	0
Mainz 05 II	2013–14	Regionalliga Südwest	7	3	—		—		—		7	3
Union Berlin (loan)	2014–15	2. Bundesliga	29	14	0	0	—		—		29	14
Queens Park Rangers	2015–16	Championship	31	6	0	0	2	1	—		33	7
Queens Park Rangers	2016–17	Championship	20	4	0	0	3	0	—		23	4
Queens Park Rangers	Total		51	10	0	0	5	1	—		56	11
Union Berlin	2016–17	2. Bundesliga	15	7	0	0	—		—		15	7
Union Berlin	2017–18	2. Bundesliga	24	12	2	0	—		—		26	12
Union Berlin	2018–19	2. Bundesliga	20	9	1	2	—		—		21	11
Union Berlin	2019–20	Bundesliga	13	2	0	0	—		—		13	2
Union Berlin	Total		72	30	3	2	—		—		75	32
Fortuna Sittard	2020–21	Eredivisie	32	9	2	1	—		—		34	10
VfL Bochum	2021–22	Bundesliga	33	10	3	1	—		—		36	11
Schalke 04	2022–23	Bundesliga	19	2	2	0	—		—		21	2
Schalke 04	2023–24	2. Bundesliga	11	3	2	0	—		—		13	3
Schalke 04	2024–25	2. Bundesliga	1	0	0	0	—		—		1	0
Schalke 04	Total		31	5	4	0	—		—		35	5
Darmstadt 98 (loan)	2023–24	Bundesliga	9	0	—		—		—		9	0
Eintracht Braunschweig	2024–25	2. Bundesliga	27	2	—		—		2 (Note: Appearances in 2. Bundesliga relegation play-offs.)	0	29	2
Eintracht Braunschweig	2025–26	2. Bundesliga	10	1	1	0	—		—		11	1
Eintracht Braunschweig	Total		37	3	1	0	—		2	0	40	3
Eintracht Braunschweig II	2025–26	Oberliga Niedersachsen	1	1	—		—		—		1	1
Partizan	2025–26	Serbian SuperLiga	17	2	—		—		—		17	2
SV Wilhelmshaven	2026–27	Oberliga Niedersachsen	0	0	—		—		—		0	0
Career total			440	114	16	4	5	1	2	0	463	119
