= Christoph Schösswendter =

Austrian footballer

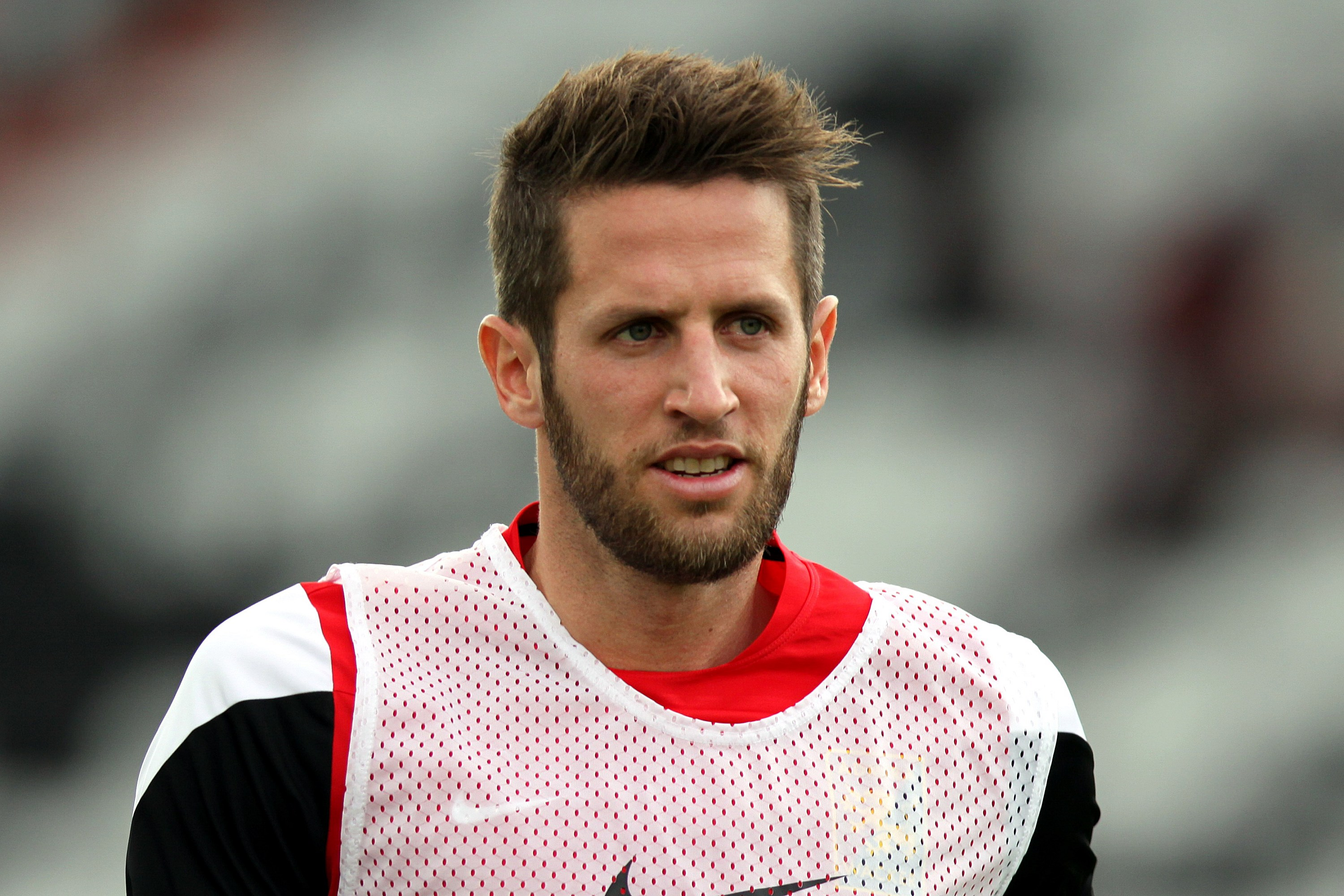

Personal information
- Date of birth: 16 July 1988 (age 38)
- Place of birth: Zell am See, Austria
- Height: 1.83 m (6 ft 0 in)
- Position: Centre-back

Team information
- Current team: Blau-Weiß Linz (sporting director)

Youth career
- 1995–2007: Pinzgau Saalfelden
- 2007: Grödig

Senior career*
| Years | Team | Apps | (Gls) |
| 2007–2009 | Vöcklabruck | 41 | (5) |
| 2009–2011 | Rapid Amateure | 20 | (1) |
| 2009–2011 | Rapid Wien | 0 | (0) |
| 2010–2011 | → FC Lustenau (loan) | 33 | (1) |
| 2011–2013 | Rheindorf Altach | 46 | (4) |
| 2013–2016 | Admira Wacker | 95 | (12) |
| 2016–2017 | Rapid Wien | 22 | (4) |
| 2017–2019 | Union Berlin | 2 | (0) |
| 2019–2020 | Admira Wacker | 33 | (1) |
| 2020–2021 | Austria Wien | 19 | (1) |
| 2022–2023 | Blau-Weiß Linz | 29 | (2) |

International career
| 2008 | Austria U-20 | 1 | (0) |

Managerial career
- 2023–: Blau-Weiß Linz (sporting director)
- * Club domestic league appearances and goals

Christoph Schösswendter (born 15 July 1988) is an Austrian football official and a former defender who is the sporting director for Blau-Weiß Linz.

== Career ==
In January 2019, Schösswendter agreed the termination of his contract with 1. FC Union Berlin. On 12 January, he then signed with Admira Wacker again, on a contract until June 2021.

On 19 October 2020, he signed with Austria Wien.

On 22 January 2022, Schösswendter signed a 1.5-year contract with Blau-Weiß Linz.

== Post-playing career ==
On 26 April 2023, Blau-Weiß Linz announced that Schösswendter is appointed the club's sporting director.

== Club statistics ==
As of 17 July 2018

Appearances and goals by club, season and competition
| Club | Season | League | | Cup | | Europe | | Total | |
| Club | Season | Apps | Goals | Apps | Goals | Apps | Goals | Apps | Goals |
|---|---|---|---|---|---|---|---|---|---|
| 1. FC Vöcklabruck | 2007–08 | 8 | 1 | — | | — | | 8 | 1 |
| 1. FC Vöcklabruck | 2008–09 | 33 | 4 | — | | — | | 33 | 4 |
| 1. FC Vöcklabruck | Total | 41 | 5 | 0 | 0 | 0 | 0 | 41 | 5 |
| Rapid Amateure | 2009–10 | 20 | 1 | — | | — | | 20 | 1 |
| Rapid Amateure | Total | 20 | 1 | 0 | 0 | 0 | 0 | 20 | 1 |
| FC Lustenau | 2010–11 | 33 | 1 | 1 | 0 | — | | 34 | 1 |
| FC Lustenau | Total | 33 | 1 | 1 | 0 | 0 | 0 | 34 | 1 |
| Rheindorf Altach | 2011–12 | 30 | 2 | — | | — | | 30 | 2 |
| Rheindorf Altach | 2012–13 | 16 | 2 | 2 | 0 | — | | 18 | 2 |
| Rheindorf Altach | Total | 46 | 4 | 2 | 0 | 0 | 0 | 48 | 4 |
| Admira Wacker | 2012–13 | 14 | 1 | — | | — | | 14 | 1 |
| Admira Wacker | 2013–14 | 25 | 3 | 3 | 0 | — | | 28 | 3 |
| Admira Wacker | 2014–15 | 32 | 1 | 2 | 0 | — | | 34 | 3 |
| Admira Wacker | 2015–16 | 24 | 7 | 2 | 0 | — | | 26 | 7 |
| Admira Wacker | Total | 95 | 12 | 7 | 0 | 0 | 0 | 102 | 12 |
| Rapid Wien | 2016–17 | 22 | 4 | 3 | 1 | 7 | 0 | 32 | 5 |
| Rapid Wien | Total | 22 | 4 | 3 | 1 | 7 | 0 | 32 | 5 |
| Union Berlin | 2017–18 | 2 | 0 | 1 | 0 | 0 | 0 | 3 | 0 |
| Union Berlin | Total | 2 | 0 | 1 | 0 | 0 | 0 | 3 | 0 |
| Career total | | 259 | 27 | 14 | 1 | 7 | 0 | 280 | 28 |
