= Kristian Pedersen =

Danish footballer (born 1994)

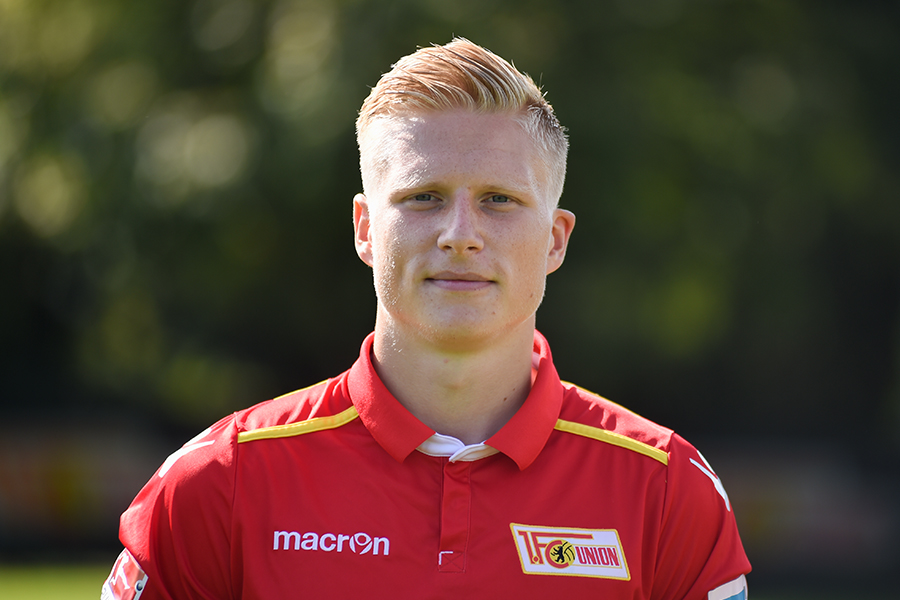
- Pedersen with Union Berlin in 2016

Personal information
- Full name: Kristian Majdahl Pedersen
- Date of birth: 4 August 1994 (age 32)
- Place of birth: Ringsted, Denmark
- Height: 1.89 m (6 ft 2 in)
- Position: Defender

Team information
- Current team: B.93
- Number: 15

Senior career*
Years	Team	Apps	(Gls)
	Benløse IF	0	(0)
–2014	Ringsted IF		
2014–2016	HB Køge	58	(2)
2016–2018	Union Berlin	61	(1)
2018–2022	Birmingham City	155	(9)
2022–2023	1. FC Köln	6	(0)
2023–2025	Swansea City	4	(0)
2024	→ Sheffield Wednesday (loan)	4	(0)
2025–2026	FC Fredericia	6	(0)
2026–	B.93	6	(0)

International career
2016	Denmark U21	5	(0)
2020	Denmark	1	(0)
- * Club domestic league appearances and goals as of 3 October 2026

Kristian Majdahl Pedersen (born 4 August 1994) is a Danish professional footballer who plays as a defender for B.93 in the Danish 2nd Division.

He has represented his country at under-21 level, and made his senior debut in 2020.

== Club career ==
Pedersen started his early career at Benløse IF, before moving to fourth division side Ringsted IF.

=== HB Køge ===
Pedersen signed for HB Køge on 24 July 2014 under head coach Henrik Pedersen. His debut for HB Køge came on 25 July 2014 when he came on as a substitute with the score at 1–1 on the first day of the first division in the away game at Skive IK in the 77th minute. On 19 April 2015, he scored his first goal for HBK against AB in a 3–0 win.

In the 2015–16 winter break he joined German Bundesliga side Borussia Mönchengladbach on trial but a move did not materialise. In the second half he came for HB Køge to twelve games in the Danish second division.

Pedersen went on to play on more than 50 occasions for the club, scoring twice in total, against AB and Skive.

=== Union Berlin ===
Following two seasons at Køge, Pedersen signed for 2. Bundesliga side Union Berlin in 2016. on a three-year deal. He made his debut for Union Berlin on 6 August 2016 against VfL Bochum in a 2–1 defeat. 30 September 2016, Pedersen received a red card against 1. FC Nürnberg.

He scored his first goal for Union Berlin on 24 February 2018, in a 2–1 win against SV Sandhausen.

=== Birmingham City ===
Pedersen signed a four-year contract with English Championship (second-tier) club Birmingham City on 25 June 2018; the fee was undisclosed. However, Birmingham's unaddressed Financial Fair Play issues left the English Football League (EFL) "exceptionally disappointed" that the club had nevertheless proceeded with a purchase, and they refused to register him. Two days before the season was due to start, and "after consideration of the legal position as between the Club, Player and the EFL", an agreement was reached such that Pedersen's registration was allowed. He made his debut on the opening day, starting at left back in a 2–2 draw at home to Norwich City.

=== 1. FC Köln ===
In July 2022, Pedersen joined 1. FC Köln on a free transfer.

=== Swansea City ===
Pedersen signed a two-year contract with Championship club Swansea City on 1 September 2023; the fee was undisclosed.

Having played little, in part because of injury, Pedersen joined divisional rivals Sheffield Wednesday on 1 February 2024 on loan for the remainder of the season. He made his debut that weekend starting in the 4–0 defeat to Huddersfield Town. Pedersen would also struggle for game time at Sheffield Wednesday, although it was again partly because of injury. He made just four appearances during his time on loan, with his only start having come during his debut against Huddersfield.

Upon returning to Swansea City, Pedersen would make just two more appearances for the club in the following season. Both of these would come in August and in the EFL Cup. Although Pedersen had already struggled to dislodge Ben Cabango and Harry Darling in Swansea's defence, this would be another season which was heavily affected by injuries. He faced two significant spells on the sidelines; the first being a hamstring injury from September until late October, and the second having come from hamstring surgery which kept him out of action from December until late April.

Pedersen was released by Swansea at the end of the 2024–25 season, having made seven appearances in all competitions.

=== FC Fredericia ===
On 17 September 2025, Pedersen signed with newly promoted Danish Superliga club FC Fredericia.

=== B.93 ===
On 14 August 2026, Pedersen joined Danish 2nd Division side B.93 on a two-year contract.

== International career ==
Pedersen has represented Denmark U-21's, making his debut in 2016 against Ukraine.

Pedersen made his senior international debut on 7 October 2020 in a friendly match against the Faroe Islands.

== Career statistics ==
As of match played 3 October 2026

Appearances and goals by club, season and competition
Club	Season	League			National cup (Note: Includes Danish Cup, DFB-Pokal and FA Cup)		League cup (Note: Includes EFL Cup)		Europe		Total	
Club	Season	Division	Apps	Goals	Apps	Goals	Apps	Goals	Apps	Goals	Apps	Goals
HB Køge	2014–15	Danish 1st Division	28	1	3	0	—		—		31	1
HB Køge	2015–16	Danish 1st Division	30	1	3	1	—		—		33	2
HB Køge	Total		58	2	6	1	—		—		64	3
Union Berlin	2016–17	2. Bundesliga	29	0	2	0	—		—		31	0
Union Berlin	2017–18	2. Bundesliga	32	1	1	0	—		—		33	1
Union Berlin	Total		61	1	3	0	—		—		64	1
Birmingham City	2018–19	EFL Championship	39	1	0	0	0	0	—		39	1
Birmingham City	2019–20	EFL Championship	44	4	4	0	0	0	—		48	4
Birmingham City	2020–21	EFL Championship	35	2	0	0	1	0	—		36	2
Birmingham City	2021–22	EFL Championship	37	2	1	0	0	0	—		38	2
Birmingham City	Total		155	9	5	0	1	0	—		161	9
1. FC Köln	2022–23	Bundesliga	6	0	1	0	—		7 (Note: Appearances in UEFA Europa Conference League)	0	14	0
1. FC Köln	2023–24	Bundesliga	0	0	0	0	—		—		0	0
1. FC Köln	Total		6	0	1	0	—		7	0	14	0
Swansea City	2023–24	EFL Championship	4	0	1	0	0	0	—		5	0
Swansea City	2024–25	EFL Championship	0	0	0	0	2	0	—		2	0
Swansea City	Total		4	0	1	0	2	0	—		7	0
Sheffield Wednesday (loan)	2023–24	EFL Championship	4	0	—		—		—		4	0
Fredericia	2025-26	Danish Superliga	6	0	1	0	—		—		7	0
B.93	2026–27	Danish 2nd Division	6	0	0	0	—		—		6	0
Career total			300	12	17	1	3	0	7	0	327	13
