= Friedrichshagener SV 1912 =

German football club

Friedrichshagener SV 1912 is a German association football club from the Friedrichshagen district of Berlin.

SC Hohenzollern Friedrichshagen was formed in Friedrichshagen on 3 October 1912. In November 1918 it was renamed SC Burgund 1912 Friedrichshagen and in the 1920s played several seasons of second division football on the city circuit. Known as SG Friedrichshagen after World War II, it was renamed to SG Burgund 1912 Friedrichshagen e. V. in 1990.

In April 2007, SG Burgund merged with Eintracht Friedrichshagen e.V. (founded 1990) to form Friedrichshagener SV 1912. In 2014–15, the club plays in the Kreisliga A Berlin Staffel 3 (IX).
