= Berkan Taz =

German footballer

Personal information
- Date of birth: 19 December 1998 (age 27)
- Place of birth: Berlin, Germany
- Height: 1.74 m (5 ft 9 in)
- Position: Attacking midfielder

Team information
- Current team: VfL Bochum
- Number: 10

Youth career
- Füchse Berlin Reinickendorf
- –2016: Hertha Zehlendorf
- 2016–2017: Union Berlin

Senior career*
Years	Team	Apps	(Gls)
2016	Hertha Zehlendorf	2	(1)
2017–2020	Union Berlin	1	(0)
2019–2020	→ Energie Cottbus (loan)	22	(11)
2020–2021	SC Verl	18	(4)
2021–2022	Borussia Dortmund II	37	(10)
2022–2024	Waldhof Mannheim	44	(1)
2024–2026	SC Verl	90	(32)
2026–	VfL Bochum	3	(0)
- * Club domestic league appearances and goals as of 28 August 2026

Berkan Taz (born 19 December 1998) is a German professional footballer who plays as an attacking midfielder for 2. Bundesliga club VfL Bochum.

== Career ==
Taz made his professional debut for Union Berlin in the 2. Bundesliga on 4 February 2019, coming on as a substitute in the 78th minute for Julian Ryerson in the 3–2 away loss against FC St. Pauli. He spent the 2019–20 season on loan at Energie Cottbus in Regionalliga Nordost where he amassed 15 goals und 10 assists in 27 matches.

On 5 October 2020, the last day of the 2020 summer transfer window, Taz moved to SC Verl, newly promoted to the 3. Liga.

On 18 January 2024, Taz returned to SC Verl.

On 15 May 2026, Taz signed a two-season contract with VfL Bochum.

== Personal life ==
Born in Germany, Taz is of Turkish descent.

== Career statistics ==
=== Club ===
As of match played 28 August 2026

Appearances and goals by club, season and competition
Club	Season	League			Cup		Other		Total	
Club	Season	Division	Apps	Goals	Apps	Goals	Apps	Goals	Apps	Goals
Hertha Zehlendorf	2016–17	NOFV-Oberliga Nord	2	1	—		—		2	1
Union Berlin	2018–19	Bundesliga	1	0	—		—		1	0
Energie Cottbus (loan)	2019–20	Regionalliga Nordost	22	11	1	1	3 (Note: Appearances in Brandenburg Cup)	1	26	13
SC Verl	2020–21	3. Liga	18	4	0	0	0	0	18	4
Borussia Dortmund II	2021–22	3. Liga	37	10	—		—		37	10
Waldhof Mannheim	2022–23	3. Liga	31	1	2	0	1 (Note: Appearance in Baden Cup)	0	34	1
Waldhof Mannheim	2023–24	3. Liga	12	0	0	0	1	0	13	0
Waldhof Mannheim	Total		43	1	2	0	2	0	47	1
SC Verl	2023–24	3. Liga	15	3	—		1 (Note: Appearances in Westphalia Cup)	0	16	3
SC Verl	2024–25	3. Liga	37	13	—		4	3	41	16
SC Verl	2025–26	3. Liga	38	16	—		3	3	41	19
SC Verl	Total		90	32	—		8	6	98	38
VfL Bochum	2026–27	2. Bundesliga	3	0	1	0	—		4	0
Career total			196	59	4	1	13	7	213	67
