= Cihan Kahraman =

Turkish footballer (born 1998)

Personal information
- Date of birth: 8 October 1998 (age 28)
- Place of birth: Berlin, Germany
- Height: 1.75 m (5 ft 9 in)
- Position: Midfielder

Team information
- Current team: Académico de Viseu
- Number: 17

Youth career
- 2005–2012: Türkiyemspor Berlin
- 2012–2017: Union Berlin

Senior career*
Years	Team	Apps	(Gls)
2017–2019	Union Berlin	0	(0)
2018–2019	→ FSV Union Fürstenwalde (loan)	25	(6)
2019–2020	Berliner AK 07	14	(3)
2020–2021	Hertha BSC II	6	(0)
2021–2023	Samsunspor	48	(2)
2023–	Académico de Viseu	51	(7)

International career^{‡}
2016–2017	Turkey U19	6	(1)
Medal record
Men's football
Representing Turkey
Islamic Solidarity Games
Gold medal – first place	2021 Konya
- * Club domestic league appearances and goals as of 19 June 2026 ‡ National team caps and goals as of 24 November 2024

Cihan Kahraman (born 8 October 1998) is a professional footballer who plays as a midfielder for Primeira Liga club Académico de Viseu. Born in Germany, he is a former Turkey youth international.

== Club career ==
Cihan, who started his football career in 2005 in the youth academy of his hometown team Türkiyemspor Berlin, was transferred to the youth academy of Union Berlin in 2012 and signed his first professional contract there. He spent the 2018–19 season on loan at FSV Union Fürstenwalde, and the following season he terminated his contract with Union Berlin and moved to Berliner AK 07. After one season there, he was transferred to Hertha BSC II. At the beginning of the 2021–22 season, he signed a four-year agreement with Samsunspor for a transfer fee of €50,000. The following season, he won the TFF 1. Lig with the team. Unable to find a place in the Süper Lig squad for the 2023–24 season, Cihan was transferred to Liga Portugal 2 team Académico de Viseu for a transfer fee of €500,000.

== International career ==
Cihan played his first international match for the Turkey national under-19 football team in a friendly match against Italy on 6 September 2016. He played six matches at under-19 level, scoring his only goal against Latvia in a 2017 UEFA European Under-19 Championship qualification match. Although he received an invitation from the Turkey national under-21 football team, he did not have the chance to enter the game.

== Honours ==
Samsunspor

- TFF 1. Lig: 2022–23
