= Lennart Moser =

German footballer

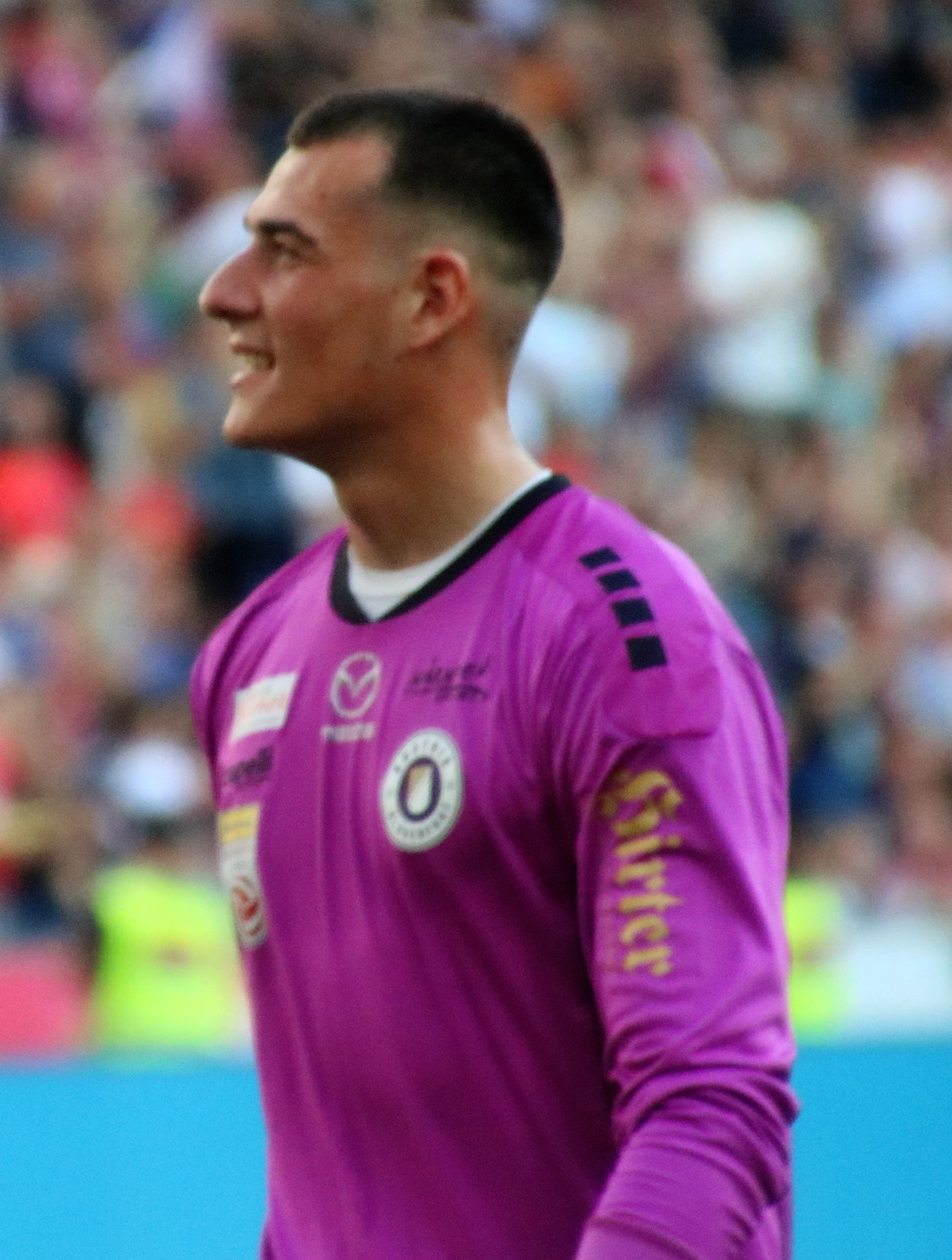
- Moser in 2022

Personal information
- Date of birth: 6 December 1999 (age 26)
- Place of birth: Berlin, Germany
- Height: 1.97 m (6 ft 6 in)
- Position: Goalkeeper

Team information
- Current team: Fagiano Okayama

Youth career
- 2003–2009: Grünauer BC
- 2010–2018: Union Berlin

Senior career*
Years	Team	Apps	(Gls)
2019–2022	Union Berlin	0	(0)
2019–2020	→ Energie Cottbus (loan)	16	(0)
2020	→ Cercle Brugge (loan)	7	(0)
2021–2022	→ Austria Klagenfurt (loan)	7	(0)
2022–2023	KAS Eupen	31	(0)
2024–2025	Kolding	51	(0)
2026–	Fagiano Okayama	12	(0)
- * Club domestic league appearances and goals as of 12 August 2026

Lennart Moser (born 6 December 1999) is a German professional footballer who plays as a goalkeeper for Japanese J1 League side Fagiano Okayama.

== Career ==
Having previously been loaned out to Regionalliga Nordost club Energie Cottbus and Belgian First Division A club Cercle Brugge from Union Berlin, Moser joined 2. Liga side Austria Klagenfurt on loan for the second half the 2020–21 season.

On 18 June 2022, Moser returned to Belgium and signed a three-year contract with Eupen. Moser's contract with Eupen was terminated by mutual consent on 31 August 2023. On 27 January 2024, Moser joined Danish 1st Division side Kolding IF., signing a contract there until 30 June 2026.

However, the contract was terminated early on 31 December 2025 after Kolding IF and the Japanese first‑division side Fagiano Okayama agreed on a transfer. On 1 January 2026, Moser moved to the J1 League, where he signed a contract running until 30 June 2028. In Okayama, Moser succeeded former FC St. Pauli goalkeeper Svend Brodersen, who had transferred within the league to Kawasaki Frontale. Moser made his J1 League debut on 1 March 2026.

Fagiano Okayama is part of the J1 100 Year Vision League, a long‑term development program in Japanese professional football that supports clubs structurally and infrastructurally on their path toward full J1 licensing.

== Career statistics ==
As of 1 August 2026

Appearances and goals by club, season and competition
Club	Season	League			Cup		Continental		Other		Total	
Club	Season	Division	Apps	Goals	Apps	Goals	Apps	Goals	Apps	Goals	Apps	Goals
Union Berlin	2019–20	Bundesliga	0	0	0	0	–		0	0	0	0
Energie Cottbus (loan)	2019–20	Regionalliga	16	0	1 (Note: Appearances in the DFB-Pokal)	0	–		0	0	17	0
Cercle Brugge (loan)	2019–20	Belgian Pro League	7	0	0	0	–		0	0	7	0
Austria Klagenfurt (loan)	2020–21	Austrian Bundesliga	7	0	0	0	-		0	0	7	0
Eupen	2022–23	Belgian Pro League	31	0	0	0	–		–		31	0
Eupen	2023–24	Belgian Pro League	0	0	0	0	–		–		0	0
Eupen	Total		31	0	0	0	0	0	0	0	31	0
Kolding IF	2023–24	Danish 1st Division	9	0	0	0	–		–		9	0
Kolding IF	2024–25	Danish 1st Division	23	0	2	0	–		–		25	0
Kolding IF	2025–26	Danish 1st Division	17	0	0	0	–		–		17	0
Kolding IF	Total		49	0	2	0	0	0	0	0	51	0
Fagiano Okayama	2026	J1 League	12	0	0	0	–		–		12	0
Career total			122	0	3	0	0	0	0	0	125	0
