= Henry Müller =

German footballer

Personal information
- Date of birth: 12 August 1896
- Place of birth: Hamburg, Germany
- Date of death: 8 September 1982 (aged 86)
- Position: Defender

Senior career*
Years	Team	Apps	(Gls)
1914–1930	Victoria Hamburg		

International career
1921–1928	Germany	9	(0)
- * Club domestic league appearances and goals

Henry Müller (12 August 1896 – 8 September 1982) was a German international footballer who played for Victoria Hamburg.
