= Peter Kurzweg =

German footballer (born 1994)

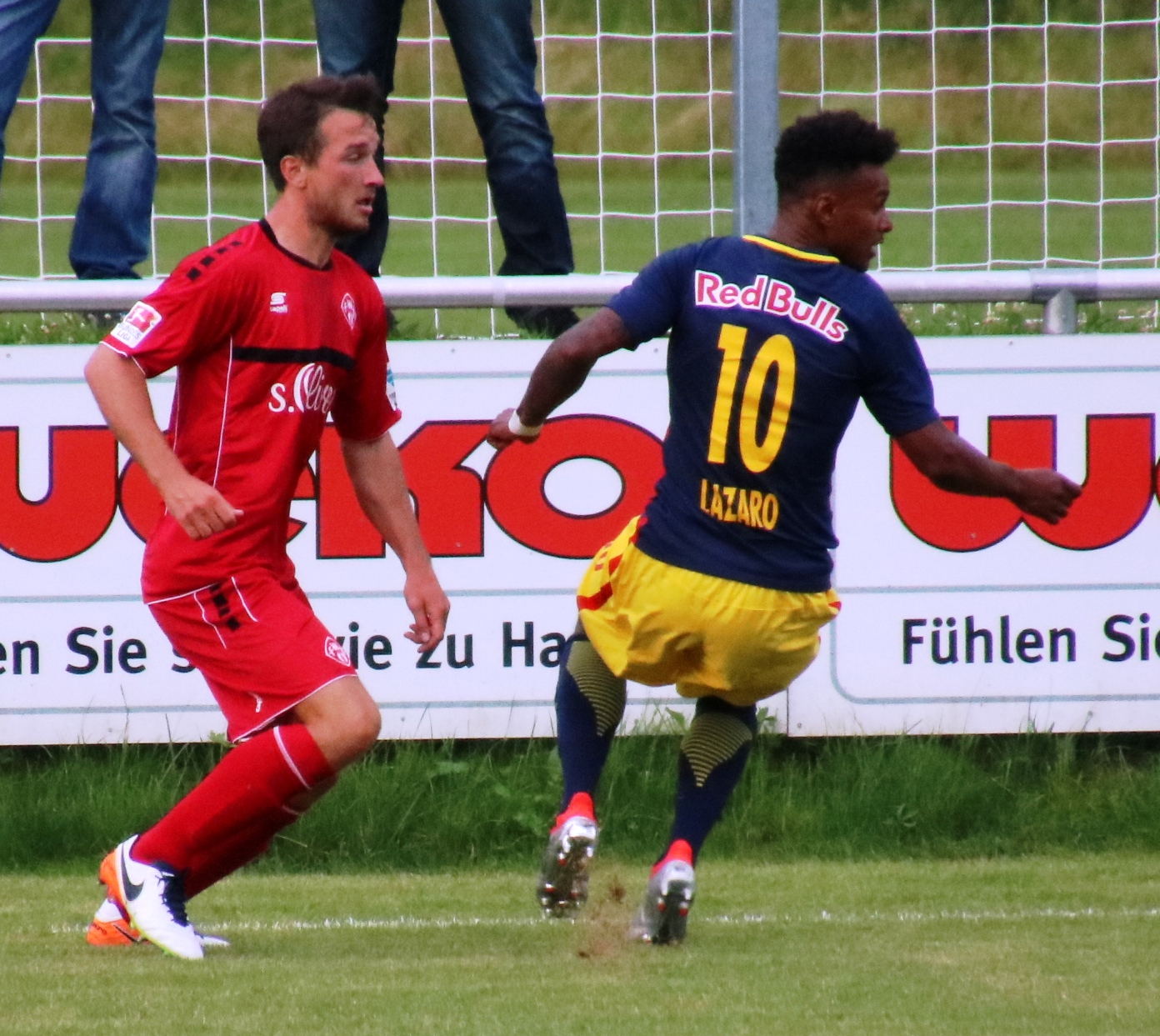
- Kurzweg (in left) in action with Würzburger Kickers in 2016

Personal information
- Date of birth: 10 February 1994 (age 32)
- Place of birth: Dachau, Germany
- Height: 1.80 m (5 ft 11 in)
- Position: Left-back

Team information
- Current team: Würzburger Kickers II

Youth career
- 2012–2013: 1860 Munich

Senior career*
Years	Team	Apps	(Gls)
2012–2015	1860 Munich II	42	(7)
2015–2017	Würzburger Kickers	55	(1)
2017–2019	Union Berlin	7	(1)
2018–2019	→ Würzburger Kickers (loan)	26	(1)
2019–2022	FC Ingolstadt 04	34	(0)
2019–2022	FC Ingolstadt 04 II	2	(1)
2022–2026	Würzburger Kickers	110	(12)
2026–	Würzburger Kickers II	0	(0)
- * Club domestic league appearances and goals as of 28 June 2026

Peter Kurzweg (born 10 February 1994) is a German professional footballer who plays as a left-back for Würzburger Kickers II.

== Career ==
Peter Kurzweg started his career with 1860 Munich, signing for them in January 2013, but only played for the second team in more than 40 league games until 2015.

He crossed Bavarian cities to join Würzburger Kickers in 2015 to try to build on from promotion from the 2014–15 season and on 30 May 2016, Kurzweg extended his contract with Würzburger Kickers until 2018.

In 2017, he joined 1. FC Union Berlin on a two-year contract. He scored a goal on his debut for them against Greuther Furth.

In 2018, he returned to Würzburger Kickers on loan until the end of 2018–19 season.

On 17 January 2022, Kurzweg returned to Würzburger Kickers for a second full spell following their relegation from the 3. Liga.
