= Fabian Schönheim =

German footballer

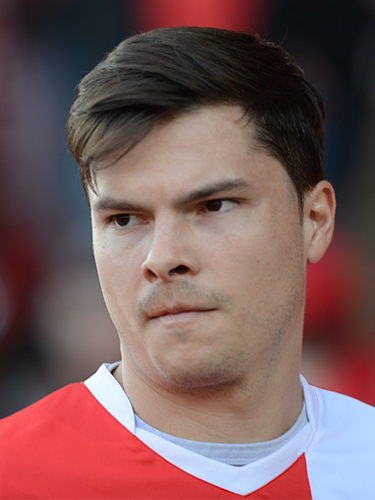
- Schönheim in 2015

Personal information
- Date of birth: 14 February 1987 (age 39)
- Place of birth: Kirn, West Germany
- Height: 1.91 m (6 ft 3 in)
- Position: Defender

Youth career
- 1993–1997: FSV Rehborn
- 1997–1998: SG Desloch-Jeckenbach
- 1998–2001: FSV Rehborn
- 2001–2005: 1. FC Kaiserslautern

Senior career*
Years	Team	Apps	(Gls)
2005–2009	1. FC Kaiserslautern	47	(2)
2008	1. FC Kaiserslautern II	3	(0)
2009–2011	SV Wehen Wiesbaden	74	(4)
2010	SV Wehen Wiesbaden II	1	(0)
2011–2012	Mainz 05 II	10	(0)
2011–2012	Mainz 05	1	(0)
2012–2019	Union Berlin	110	(4)

International career
	Germany U-19	6	(0)
2006–2009	Germany U-21	10	(0)
- * Club domestic league appearances and goals as of 00:25, 23 September 2019 (UTC)

Fabian Schönheim (born 14 February 1987) is a German former professional footballer who played as a defender.

== Early career ==
After spending the first part of his youth career with local side Rehborn, Schönheim signed for Kaiserslautern and played in their youth team for a further four years. He then, in 2005, began in the first team aged 18. He went on to make nearly 50 league appearances for the club and the reserves. He was at the club when they were relegated from the Bundesliga in the 2005–06 season.

== Club career ==
=== SV Wehen Wiesbaden ===
He joined newly relegated 3. Liga side Wehen Wiesbaden. He played a big role at the club for two seasons, played in 74 league games and scored 4 times.

=== Mainz 05 ===
The defender then moved to 1. FSV Mainz 05 in 2011 but struggled to break into the first team and only played ten games for the reserve side.

=== Union Berlin ===
The following season Schönheim joined 2. Bundesliga outfit Union Berlin. He has been involved in many unsuccessful promotion pushes since joining and has now played more than 100 games for the club. He has also spent the majority of his professional career at Union and scored 5 goals.

== International career ==
Schönheim made six appearances at U-19 level for Germany. He also played ten times at U-21 level.
