= Daniel Mesenhöler =

German footballer

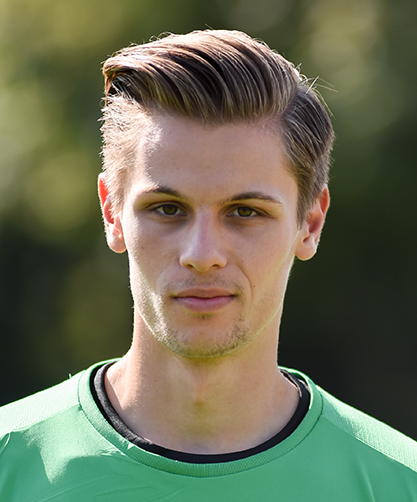
- Mesenhöler in 2016

Personal information
- Date of birth: 24 July 1995 (age 31)
- Place of birth: Engelskirchen, Germany
- Height: 1.88 m (6 ft 2 in)
- Position: Goalkeeper

Team information
- Current team: Dynamo Dresden
- Number: 37

Youth career
- TuS Othetal
- –2013: 1. FC Köln

Senior career*
Years	Team	Apps	(Gls)
2013–2016	1. FC Köln II	53	(0)
2014–2016	1. FC Köln	0	(0)
2016–2018	Union Berlin	26	(0)
2018–2019	MSV Duisburg	15	(0)
2019–2020	Viktoria Köln	18	(0)
2020–2021	Heracles Almelo	0	(0)
2021–2023	Hallescher FC	10	(0)
2024–	Dynamo Dresden	2	(0)

International career
2010–2011	Germany U16	5	(0)
2011	Germany U17	2	(0)
2013	Germany U19	4	(0)
2014–2016	Germany U20	4	(0)
- * Club domestic league appearances and goals as of 18 May 2026

Daniel Mesenhöler (born 24 July 1995) is a German professional footballer who plays as a goalkeeper for 2. Bundesliga club Dynamo Dresden.

== Career ==
Mesenhöler made his professional debut for Union Berlin on 26 October 2016, in the second round of the 2016–17 edition of the DFB-Pokal, against Bundesliga club Borussia Dortmund. Mesenhöler started the match and played the full 120 minutes. The away match finished as a 1–1 draw after extra time, with Union losing 3–0 on penalties. Mesenhöler failed to make a save in the shootout, and all three Union players missed their penalties.

He signed for MSV Duisburg for the 2018–19 season. A year later, he joined Viktoria Köln.

On 24 September 2021, he joined Hallescher FC for the 2021–22 season.

On 26 January 2024, Mesenhöler signed with Dynamo Dresden until the end of the season.

== Career statistics ==
=== Club ===
As of match played 18 April 2026

Appearances and goals by club, season and competition
Club	Season	League			National Cup (Note: Includes DFB-Pokal, KNVB Cup)		Other		Total	
Club	Season	Division	Apps	Goals	Apps	Goals	Apps	Goals	Apps	Goals
1. FC Köln II	2012–13	Regionalliga	0	0	—		—		0	0
1. FC Köln II	2013–14	Regionalliga	3	0	—		—		3	0
1. FC Köln II	2014–15	Regionalliga	25	0	—		—		25	0
1. FC Köln II	2015–16	Regionalliga	25	0	—		—		25	0
1. FC Köln II	Total		53	0	—		—		53	0
1. FC Köln	2014–15	Bundesliga	0	0	0	0	—		0	0
1. FC Köln	2015–16	Bundesliga	0	0	0	0	—		0	0
1. FC Köln	Total		0	0	0	0	—		0	0
Union Berlin	2016–17	2. Bundesliga	12	0	1	0	—		13	0
Union Berlin	2017–18	2. Bundesliga	14	0	2	0	—		16	0
Union Berlin	Total		26	0	3	0	—		29	0
MSV Duisburg	2018–19	2. Bundesliga	15	0	1	0	—		16	0
Viktoria Köln	2019–20	3. Liga	18	0	—		—		18	0
Heracles Almelo	2020–21	Eredivisie	0	0	0	0	—		0	0
Hallescher FC	2021–22	3. Liga	8	0	—		—		8	0
Hallescher FC	2022–23	3. Liga	2	0	—		—		2	0
Hallescher FC	Total		10	0	—		—		10	0
Dynamo Dresden	2023–24	3. Liga	1	0	—		—		1	0
Dynamo Dresden	2024–25	3. Liga	0	0	0	0	—		0	0
Dynamo Dresden	2025–26	2. Bundesliga	1	0	0	0	—		1	0
Dynamo Dresden	2026–27	2. Bundesliga	0	0	0	0	—		0	0
Dynamo Dresden	Total		2	0	0	0	—		2	0
Career total			124	0	4	0	0	0	128	0
