= 2011–12 1. FC Union Berlin season =

Union Berlin
2011–12 season
- Manager: Uwe Neuhaus
- Stadium: Stadion An der Alten Försterei
- 2. Bundesliga: 7th
- DFB-Pokal: First round

The 2011–12 1. FC Union Berlin season was the 106th season in the club's history. The club competed in the 2. Bundesliga, the second tier of German football; it was the club's third consecutive season in the league, following promotion from the 3. Liga in 2009. Union Berlin finished 7th. The club also competed in the DFB-Pokal but were eliminated in the first round by Rot-Weiss Essen.

== 2. Bundesliga ==
=== League table ===
| Pos | Team | Pld | W | D | L | GF | GA | GD | Pts |
|---|---|---|---|---|---|---|---|---|---|
| 5 | SC Paderborn | 34 | 17 | 10 | 7 | 51 | 42 | +9 | 61 |
| 6 | 1860 Munich | 34 | 17 | 6 | 11 | 62 | 46 | +16 | 57 |
| 7 | Union Berlin | 34 | 14 | 6 | 14 | 55 | 58 | −3 | 48 |
| 8 | Eintracht Braunschweig | 34 | 10 | 15 | 9 | 37 | 35 | +2 | 45 |
| 9 | Dynamo Dresden | 34 | 12 | 9 | 13 | 50 | 52 | −2 | 45 |

Source: kicker
Rules for classification: 1) points; 2) goal difference; 3) number of goals scored.

=== Matches ===
| Win | Draw | Loss |

| Match | Date | Time | Opponent | Venue | Result F–A | Scorers | Attendance | Ref. |
|---|---|---|---|---|---|---|---|---|
| 1 | 15 July 2011 | 18:00 | FSV Frankfurt | 1–1 | Away | Sílvio 40' pen. | 4,151 | |
| 2 | 23 July 2011 | 15:30 | Greuther Fürth | 0–4 | Home | | 15,004 | |
| 3 | 5 August 2011 | 18:00 | SC Paderborn | 3–0 | Home | Stuff 5', Quiring 64', 66' | 13,378 | |
| 4 | 12 August 2011 | 18:00 | Dynamo Dresden | 0–4 | Away | | 29,315 | |
| 5 | 20 August 2011 | 13:00 | VfL Bochum | 2–1 | Home | Sílvio 45' pen., Mosquera 64' | 14,388 | |
| 6 | 28 August 2011 | 13:30 | 1860 Munich | 1–3 | Away | Mosquera 24' | 22,500 | |
| 7 | 11 September 2011 | 13:30 | FC Ingolstadt | 4–1 | Home | Stuff 21', Sílvio 30', 86', Mattuschka 49' | 15,204 | |
| 8 | 17 September 2011 | 13:00 | MSV Duisburg | 1–1 | Away | Mosquera 5' | 11,347 | |
| 9 | 24 September 2011 | 13:00 | Alemannia Aachen | 2–0 | Home | Karl 38', Mattuschka 87' pen. | 14,889 | |
| 10 | 30 September 2011 | 18:00 | Eintracht Frankfurt | 1–3 | Away | Quiring 75' | 35,100 | |
| 11 | 15 October 2011 | 13:00 | Karlsruher SC | 2–0 | Home | Quiring 15', Parensen 79' | 16,301 | |
| 12 | 23 October 2011 | 13:30 | Erzgebirge Aue | 1–1 | Away | Mattuschka 18' | 10,100 | |
| 13 | 28 October 2011 | 18:00 | FC St. Pauli | 0–2 | Home | | 18,432 | |
| 14 | 4 November 2011 | 18:15 | Eintracht Braunschweig | 2–1 | Away | Ede 5', Zoundi 80' | 22,355 | |
| 15 | 19 November 2011 | 13:30 | Fortuna Düsseldorf | 0–0 | Home | | 18,432 | |
| 16 | 25 November 2011 | 18:15 | Hansa Rostock | 5–2 | Away | Pfertzel 49', Quiring 54', Mosquera 59', 67', Zoundi 90' | 14,000 | |
| 17 | 2 December 2011 | 18:00 | Energie Cottbus | 1–0 | Home | Sílvio 10' | 17,478 | |
| 18 | 10 December 2011 | 13:00 | FSV Frankfurt | 4–0 | Home | Ede 17', N'Diaye 28' o.g., Stuff 79', Terodde 82' | 12,721 | |
| 19 | 16 December 2011 | 18:00 | Greuther Fürth | 0–5 | Away | | 7,130 | |
| 20 | 3 February 2012 | 18:00 | SC Paderborn | 2–3 | Away | Mattuschka 14', Sílvio 69' | 7,549 | |
| 21 | 11 February 2012 | 13:00 | Dynamo Dresden | 4–0 | Home | Quiring 44' pen., Mosquera 58', Terodde 65', 76' | 18,432 | |
| 22 | 18 February 2012 | 13:00 | VfL Bochum | 2–4 | Away | Zoundi 66', Sílvio 72' pen. | 11,501 | |
| 23 | 24 February 2012 | 18:00 | 1860 Munich | 0–1 | Home | | 15,723 | |
| 24 | 2 March 2012 | 18:00 | FC Ingolstadt | 3–3 | Away | Ede 35', Terodde 48', Karl 90' | 6,264 | |
| 25 | 9 March 2012 | 18:00 | MSV Duisburg | 1–1 | Home | Terodde 90' | 15,076 | |
| 26 | 16 March 2012 | 18:00 | Alemannia Aachen | 3–1 | Away | Ede 23' Terodde 41', Zoundi 46' | 15,165 | |
| 27 | 26 March 2012 | 20:15 | Eintracht Frankfurt | 0–4 | Home | | 16,589 | |
| 28 | 1 April 2012 | 13:30 | Karlsruher SC | 0–2 | Away | | 14,588 | |
| 29 | 5 April 2012 | 18:00 | Erzgebirge Aue | 1–0 | Home | Ede 9' | 16,728 | |
| 30 | 10 April 2012 | 17:30 | FC St. Pauli | 1–2 | Away | Karl 32' | 24,487 | |
| 31 | 13 April 2012 | 18:00 | Eintracht Braunschweig | 1–0 | Home | Terodde 30' | 17,028 | |
| 32 | 22 April 2012 | 13:30 | Fortuna Düsseldorf | 1–2 | Away | Terodde 18' | 33,637 | |
| 33 | 29 April 2012 | 13:30 | Hansa Rostock | 5–4 | Home | Sílvio 17', Parensen 26', Mattuschka 28' pen., Ede 47', Göhlert 69' | 18,300 | |
| 34 | 6 May 2012 | 13:30 | Energie Cottbus | 1–2 | Away | Ede 61' | 20,049 | |

== DFB-Pokal ==
| Win | Draw | Loss |

| Round | Date | Time | Opponent | Venue | Result F–A | Scorers | Attendance | Ref. |
|---|---|---|---|---|---|---|---|---|
| First round | 29 July 2011 | 20:30 | Rot-Weiss Essen | Away | 2–2 (a.e.t.) (3–4 p) | Zoundi 82', Terodde 90+1' | 12,701 | |

== Appearances and goals ==
Numbers in parentheses denote appearances as substitute.
Players with names struck through and marked † left the club during the playing season.
Players with names in italics and marked * were on loan from another club for the whole of their season with Union Berlin.
Key to positions: GK – Goalkeeper; DF – Defender; MF – Midfielder; FW – Forward

Players' appearances and goals by competition
| No. | Pos. | Nat. | Name | 2. Bundesliga | | DFB-Pokal | | Total | |
| No. | Pos. | Nat. | Name | Apps | Goals | Apps | Goals | Apps | Goals |
|---|---|---|---|---|---|---|---|---|---|
| 1 | GK | GER | Jan Glinker | 29 | 0 | 1 | 0 | 30 | 0 |
| 2 | MF | GER | Christopher Quiring | 21 (2) | 6 | 1 | 0 | 22 (2) | 6 |
| 4 | DF | MAR | Ahmed Reda Madouni | 10 (5) | 0 | 0 | 0 | 10 (5) | 0 |
| 5 | DF | GER | Christian Stuff | 27 (3) | 3 | 1 | 0 | 28 (3) | 3 |
| 6 | DF | FRA | Marc Pfertzel | 29 | 1 | 1 | 0 | 30 | 1 |
| 7 | DF | GER | Patrick Kohlmann | 33 | 0 | 1 | 0 | 34 | 0 |
| 8 | MF | GER | Markus Karl | 30 (3) | 3 | 1 | 0 | 31 (3) | 3 |
| 9 | FW | COL | ~~John Jairo Mosquera~~ † | 12 (6) | 6 | 0 (1) | 0 | 12 (7) | 6 |
| 11 | FW | GER | Simon Terodde * | 23 (4) | 8 | 1 | 1 | 24 (4) | 9 |
| 14 | FW | BFA | Patrick Zoundi | 8 (20) | 4 | 1 | 1 | 9 (20) | 5 |
| 15 | DF | GER | Daniel Göhlert | 8 (5) | 1 | 1 | 0 | 9 (5) | 1 |
| 16 | DF | GER | Christoph Menz | 22 (5) | 0 | 0 (1) | 0 | 22 (6) | 0 |
| 17 | MF | GER | Torsten Mattuschka | 27 (4) | 5 | 1 | 0 | 28 (4) | 5 |
| 18 | DF | GER | Maurice Trapp | 1 (5) | 0 | 0 | 0 | 1 (5) | 0 |
| 19 | MF | GER | Chinedu Ede | 23 (8) | 7 | 0 (1) | 0 | 23 (9) | 7 |
| 20 | DF | GER | Jérôme Polenz | 2 (6) | 0 | 0 | 0 | 2 (6) | 0 |
| 21 | FW | GER | ~~Halil Savran~~ † | 1 (4) | 0 | 0 | 0 | 1 (4) | 0 |
| 21 | MF | TUN | Tijani Belaid | 7 (6) | 0 | 0 | 0 | 7 (6) | 0 |
| 23 | FW | BRA | Sílvio | 25 (2) | 8 | 1 | 0 | 26 (2) | 8 |
| 24 | FW | GER | Steven Skrzybski | 2 (5) | 0 | 0 | 0 | 2 (5) | 0 |
| 28 | GK | GER | Kilian Pruschke | 1 | 0 | 0 | 0 | 1 | 0 |
| 29 | DF | GER | Michael Parensen | 29 | 2 | 0 | 0 | 29 | 2 |
| 40 | GK | GER | Marcel Höttecke | 4 | 0 | 0 | 0 | 4 | 0 |

Players not included in matchday squads
| No. | Pos. | Nat. | Name |
|---|---|---|---|
| 12 | MF | GER | Oliver Hofmann |
| 13 | DF | GER | Stephan Gill |
| 25 | MF | GER | Philip Malinowski |
| 26 | DF | GER | Fabian Fritsche |
| 27 | DF | GER | Boné Uaferro |
| 31 | GK | GER | Eric Niendorf |
| 35 | MF | GER | Sven Reimann |
| 37 | FW | GER | Pascal Wedemann |
