= 2012–13 1. FC Union Berlin season =

1. FC Union Berlin
2012–13 season
- Manager: Uwe Neuhaus
- Stadium: Stadion An der Alten Försterei
- 2.Bundesliga: 7th
- DFB-Pokal: Second round

The 2012–13 1. FC Union Berlin season is the 107th season in the club's football history. In 2012–13 the club plays in the 2. Fußball-Bundesliga, the second tier of German football. It is the clubs fourth consecutive season in this league, having played at this level since 2009–10, after it was promoted from the 3. Liga in 2009.

The club also takes part in the 2012–13 edition of the DFB-Pokal, the German Cup, where it reached the second round and will face third division side Kickers Offenbach next.

== Friendly matches ==
Win	Draw	Loss

Date	Time	Opponent	Venue	Result F–A	Scorers	Attendance	Ref.
21 June 2012	18:00	Rügen XI	Away (Note: Match took place at Stadion der Einheit Binz, Binz)	12–0	Skrzybski 12', 22', 44', Stuff 14', 23', Zoundi 25', Belaïd 27', Jopek 45', Terodde 63', Kohlmann 85', Ede 86', Quiring 87'	832	
4 July 2012	19:00	FC Strausberg	Away (Note: Match took place at Energiearena, Strausberg)	2–1	Mattuschka 17', Skrzybski 27'	2,500	
7 July 2012	14:00	Grün Weiß Annaburg	Away (Note: Match took place at Waldstadion, Annaburg)	20–0	Schönheim 4', Sílvio 21', 24', 27', 43', Skrzybski 23', Hofmann 48', 61', 72', Belaïd 56', 66', Karl 58', Quiring 60', 74', Terodde 64', 71', Mattuschka 76', 77', 87', 90'	1,500	
11 July 2012	19:00	VSG Altglenicke	Away (Note: Match took place at Stadion Altglienicke, Berlin)	5–0	Mattuschka 22', 62', Schönheim 53', Belaïd 76', Sílvio 84'	1,849	
14 July 2012	15:00	VfB Pommern Löcknitz	Away (Note: Match took place at Sportplatz Löcknitz, Löcknitz)	23–1	Stuff 3', Belaïd 7', 12', 22', 23', Marquardt 9' (o.g.), Skrzybski 17', 40', 80', Sílvio 20', 25', 43', 48', 49', 51', Menz 33', Hofmann 57', Parensen 68', Terodde 71', 72', 87', Quiring 75', 85'	850	
21 July 2012	15:00	VfB Lübeck	Home	1–0	Skrzybski 81'	1,463	
24 July 2012	19:30	Hibernian	Home	2–0	Parensen 50', Quiring 90'	4,887	
29 July 2012	14:30	PSV Eindhoven	Home	1–1	Terodde 2'	8,752	
8 January 2013	11:00	Recreativo de Huelva	Away (Note: Match took place at Estadio Municipal Luis Rodriguez S, Huelva)	1–1	Nemec 85'	200	
9 January 2013	16:00	FC Utrecht	Home	2–0	Zoundi 23', Jopek 39'	350	
12 January 2013	16:00	SV Wehen Wiesbaden	Home	3–0	Terodde 28', Jopek 49', Nemec 65'	200	
19 January 2013	14:00	Chemnitzer FC	Away	2–1	Skrzybski 35', Stuff 60'	1,300	
22 January 2013	19:00	Lausanne-Sport	Home	4–2	Mattuschka 9', Terodde 23', 50', 64'	981	
26 January 2013	13:00	Eintracht Braunschweig	Away	0–0	—	1,850	

== Competitions ==
=== 2.Bundesliga ===
==== League table ====
Pos	Team	Pld	W	D	L	GF	GA	GD	Pts
5	1. FC Köln	34	14	12	8	43	33	+10	54
6	TSV 1860 Munich	34	12	13	9	39	31	+8	49
7	1. FC Union Berlin	34	13	10	11	50	49	+1	49
8	Energie Cottbus	34	12	12	10	41	36	+5	48
9	VfR Aalen	34	12	10	12	40	39	+1	46

Source: kicker.de
Rules for classification: 1) points; 2) goal difference; 3) number of goals scored.

==== Matches ====
Win	Draw	Loss

Match	Date	Time	Opponent	Venue	Result F–A	Scorers	Attendance	Referee	Ref.
1	6 August 2012	20:15	1. FC Kaiserslautern	Away	3–3	Parensen 47', Zoundi 54', Pfertzel 90+1'	31,618	Stieler	
2	12 August 2012	13:30	Eintracht Braunschweig	Home	0–1	—	16,750	Kinhöfer	
3	24 August 2012	18:00	SV Sandhausen	Away	0–2	—	3,500	Steinhaus	
4	3 September 2012	20:15	Hertha BSC	Home	1–2	Quiring 69'	16,750	Gagelmann	
5	14 September 2012	18:00	FC Ingolstadt 04	Away	1–2	Jopek 40'	5,251	Kempter	
6	21 September 2012	18:00	1. FC Köln	Home	2–1	Silvio 27', Mattuschka 56'	16,750	Sippel	
7	26 September 2012	17:30	Erzgebirge Aue	Away	1–1	Terodde 7'	7,500	Steinhaus	
8	29 September 2012	13:00	Energie Cottbus	Home	3–1	Terodde 35', Quiring 55', Jopek 90+2'	16,750	Aytekin	
9	5 October 2012	18:00	FC St. Pauli	Away	2–2	Mattuschka 21', 84'	21,045	Dankert	
10	21 October 2012	13:30	FSV Frankfurt	Home	1–0	Mattuschka 17' (pen.)	15,701	Schriever	
11	28 October 2012	13:30	SC Paderborn	Home	0–1	—	15,738	Osmers	
12	4 November 2012	13:30	Dynamo Dresden	Away	2–0	Schönheim 14', 54'	29,452	Perl	
13	10 November 2012	13:00	VfR Aalen	Home	0–0	—	15,102	Christ	
14	18 November 2012	13:30	Jahn Regensburg	Away	3–3	Terodde 31', 56', Jopek 75'	5,553	Petersen	
15	24 November 2012	13:00	1860 Munich	Home	2–2	Stuff 22', Nemec 81'	16,750	Meyer	
16	28 November 2012	17:30	MSV Duisburg	Away	2–1	Brandy 20' (o.g.), Terodde 35'	8,585	Kempter	
17	1 December 2012	13:00	VfL Bochum	Home	2–1	Karl 3', Nemec 51'	16,074	Dietz	
18	7 December 2012	18:00	1. FC Kaiserslautern	Home	2–0	Terodde 43', 66'	16,750	Schmidt	
19	17 December 2012	20:15	Eintracht Braunschweig	Away	3–4	Nemec 4', 32', Quiring 90+1'	21,200	Sippel	
20	1 February 2013	18:00	SV Sandhausen	Home	3–1	Parensen 6', Mattuschka 32' (pen.), Özbek 68'	17,532	Bandurski	
21	11 February 2013	20:15	Hertha BSC	Away	2–2	Terodde 9', Nemec 49'	74,244	Meyer	
22	16 February 2013	13:00	FC Ingolstadt 04	Home	1–1	Nemec 85'	15,461	Grudzinski	
23	23 February 2013	13:00	1. FC Köln	Away	0–2	—	42,000	Willenborg	
24	1 March 2013	18:00	Erzgebirge Aue	Home	3–0	Nemec 7', Mattuschka 45' (pen.), Parensen 57'	17,284	Petersen	
25	9 March 2013	13:00	Energie Cottbus	Away	1–2	Mattuschka 38' (pen.)	14,212	Brych	
26	15 March 2013	18:00	FC St. Pauli	Home	4–2	Terodde 20', 83', Mattuschka 42', Nemec 81'	21,410	Winkmann	
27	31 March 2013	13:30	FSV Frankfurt	Away	0–3	—	4,842	Leicher	
28	7 April 2013	13:30	SC Paderborn	Away	1–1	Nemec 27'	7,590	Brand	
29	12 April 2013	18:00	Dynamo Dresden	Home	0–0	—	21,244	Drees	
30	19 April 2013	18:00	VfR Aalen	Away	0–3	—	6,620	Wingenbach	
31	26 April 2013	18:00	Jahn Regensburg	Home	1–0	Mattuschka 63' (pen.)	16,857	Osmers	
32	5 May 2013	13:30	1860 Munich	Away	0–3	—	18,100	Schmidt	
33	12 May 2013	13:30	MSV Duisburg	Home	2–1	Quiring 59', Mattuschka 81' (pen.)	19,556	Cortus	
34	19 May 2013	13:30	VfL Bochum	Away	2–1	Özbek 49', Skrzybski 55'	24,244	Stieler	

=== DFB Pokal ===
Win	Draw	Loss

Round	Date	Time	Opponent	Venue	Result F–A	Scorers	Attendance	Referee	Ref.
First round	20 August 2012	18:30	Rot-Weiss Essen	Away	1–0 (a.e.t.)	Terodde 120'	12,500	Petersen	
Second round	31 October 2012	19:00	Kickers Offenbach	Away	0–2	—	12,247	Gagelmann	
