= 2014–15 1. FC Union Berlin season =

1. FC Union Berlin
2014–15 season
- Stadium: Stadion An der Alten Försterei
- 2. Bundesliga: 7th
- DFB-Pokal: First round
Home colours	Away colours

The 2014–15 1. FC Union Berlin season was the club's sixth consecutive season in the 2. Bundesliga.

== Competitions ==
=== 2. Bundesliga ===
==== Results ====
2. Bundesliga match details
Match	Date	Opponent	Venue	Result F–A	Scorers	Attendance	Ref.
1	3 August 2014	Karlsruher SC	Away	0–0		18,489	
2	8 August 2014	Fortuna Düsseldorf	Home	1–1	Kreilach 64'	20,562	
3	25 August 2014	VfL Bochum	Away	1–1	Brandy 49'	16,307	
4	29 August 2014	1. FC Nürnberg	Home	0–4		20,421	
5	14 September 2014	1. FC Heidenheim	Away	1–3	Köhler 82' pen.	11,000	
6	21 September 2014	RB Leipzig	Home	2–1	Polter 70', 83'	21,366	
7	24 September 2014	1. FC Kaiserslautern	Away	0–1		31,384	
8	27 September 2014	Darmstadt 98	Home	1–1	Quiring 85'	18,124	
9	4 October 2014	FC St. Pauli	Away	0–3		29,063	
10	18 October 2014	Sandhausen	Home	3–1	Polter 52', 80', Brandy 59'	17,106	
11	24 October 2014	VfR Aalen	Away	2–1	Leistner 62', Brandy 70'	5,435	
12	31 October 2014	Greuther Fürth	Home	0–1		18,702	
13	9 November 2014	FC Ingolstadt	Away	3–3	Köhler 18' pen., Quiring 21', Polter 79'	8,008	
14	22 November 2014	1860 Munich	Home	1–4	Polter 51'	19,026	
15	28 November 2014	Erzgebirge Aue	Away	2–1	Kreilach 77', 86'	9,100	
16	7 December 2014	FSV Frankfurt	Home	2–1	Skrzybski 47', Thiel 71'	15,802	
17	13 December 2014	Eintracht Braunschweig	Away	1–1	Thiel 28'	23,050	
18	16 December 2014	Karlsruher SC	Home	2–0	Quiring 2', Polter 72'	17,084	
19	19 December 2014	Fortuna Düsseldorf	Away	0–1		28,256	
20	7 February 2015	VfL Bochum	Home	2–1	Kobylański 50', Kreilach 86'	19,015	
21	15 February 2015	1. FC Nürnberg	Away	1–3	Polter 17'	29,166	
22	22 February 2015	1. FC Heidenheim	Home	3–1	Kreilach 7', Brandy 28', Quiring 56'	16,512	
23	1 March 2015	RB Leipzig	Away	2–3	Skrzybski 8', Polter 29'	24,780	
24	8 March 2015	1. FC Kaiserslautern	Home	0–0		20,842	
25	13 March 2015	Darmstadt 98	Away	0–5		15,000	
26	20 March 2015	FC St. Pauli	Home	1–0	Polter 89'	21,717	
27	5 April 2015	Sandhausen	Away	1–1	Achenbach 51' o.g.	5,318	
28	12 April 2015	VfR Aalen	Home	1–1	Polter 83' pen.	18,622	
29	19 April 2015	Greuther Fürth	Away	2–2	Thiel 8', Parensen 79'	11,080	
30	26 April 2015	FC Ingolstadt	Home	2–2	Jopek 75', 79'	17,761	
31	3 May 2015	1860 Munich	Away	3–0	Polter 19', 89', Kreilach 80'	18,800	
32	9 May 2015	Erzgebirge Aue	Home	1–2	Kobylański 64'	21,035	
33	17 May 2015	FSV Frankfurt	Away	3–1	Thiel 10', Kobylański 63', Kreilach 81'	6,853	
34	24 May 2015	Eintracht Braunschweig	Home	2–0	Schönheim 48', Polter 59'	21,717	

==== League table ====
Pos	Team	Pld	W	D	L	GF	GA	GD	Pts
5	RB Leipzig	34	13	11	10	39	31	+8	50
6	Eintracht Braunschweig	34	15	5	14	44	41	+3	50
7	Union Berlin	34	12	11	11	46	51	−5	47
8	1. FC Heidenheim	34	12	10	12	49	44	+5	46
9	1. FC Nürnberg	34	13	6	15	42	47	−5	45

Source: DFB
Rules for classification: 1) Points; 2) Goal difference; 3) Goals scored

=== DFB-Pokal ===
DFB-Pokal match details
Round	Date	Opponent	Venue	Result F–A	Scorers	Attendance	Ref.
First round	18 August 2014	1. FC Heidenheim	Away	1–2	Schönheim 79'	7,600	

== Squad statistics ==
No.	Pos	Nat	Player	Total		2. Bundesliga		DFB-Pokal	
No.	Pos	Nat	Player	Apps	Goals	Apps	Goals	Apps	Goals
Goalkeepers
1	GK	(Germany) GER	Daniel Haas	29	0	29	0	0	0
12	GK	(Morocco) MAR	Mohamed Amsif	7	0	6	0	1	0
Defenders
4	DF	(Croatia) CRO	Roberto Punčec	31	0	30	0	1	0
15	DF	(Switzerland) SUI	Mario Eggimann	2	0	2	0	0	0
28	DF	(Austria) AUT	Christopher Trimmel	30	0	29	0	1	0
29	DF	(Germany) GER	Michael Parensen	26	1	26	1	0	0
34	DF	(Germany) GER	Fabian Schönheim	28	2	27	1	1	1
37	DF	(Germany) GER	Toni Leistner	31	1	30	1	1	0
	DF	(Germany) GER	Björn Kopplin	18	0	18	0	0	0
Midfielders
7	MF	(Germany) GER	Benjamin Köhler	18	2	18	2	0	0
8	MF	(Germany) GER	Barış Özbek	8	0	7	0	1	0
10	MF	(Germany) GER	Martin Dausch	8	0	7	0	1	0
11	MF	(Germany) GER	Maximilian Thiel	16	4	16	4	0	0
16	MF	(Egypt) EGY	Abdallah Gomaa	1	0	1	0	0	0
18	MF	(Poland) POL	Martin Kobylański	19	3	19	3	0	0
19	MF	(Croatia) CRO	Damir Kreilach	34	7	33	7	1	0
25	MF	(Germany) GER	Björn Jopek	24	2	23	2	1	0
27	MF	(Kosovo) KOS	Eroll Zejnullahu	23	0	23	0	0	0
39	MF	(Germany) GER	David Hollwitz	2	0	2	0	0	0
	MF	(Germany) GER	Torsten Mattuschka	3	0	2	0	1	0
	MF	(Germany) GER	Leonard Koch	1	0	1	0	0	0
Forwards
9	FW	(Germany) GER	Sören Brandy	22	4	21	4	1	0
9	FW	(Kosovo) KOS	Valmir Sulejmani	6	0	6	0	0	0
17	FW	(El Salvador) SLV	Adam Nemec	5	0	5	0	0	0
20	FW	(Germany) GER	Steven Skrzybski	24	2	23	2	1	0
23	FW	(Germany) GER	Sebastian Polter	29	14	29	14	0	0
33	FW	(Kosovo) KOS	Bajram Nebihi	10	0	9	0	1	0
	FW	(Germany) GER	Christopher Quiring	29	4	29	4	0	0

Last updated: 12 January 2020
