= Jan Glinker =

German footballer (born 1984)

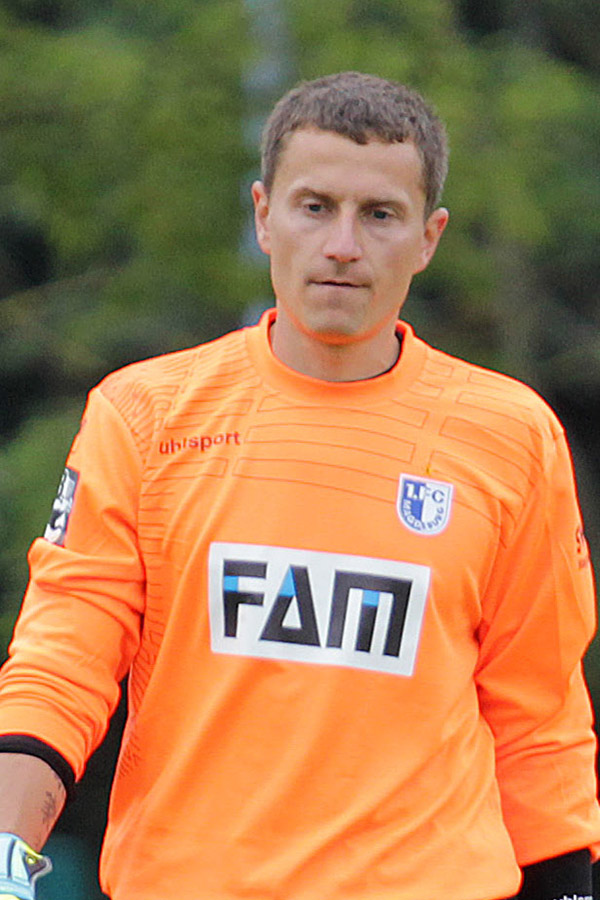
- Glinker playing for 1. FC Magdeburg in 2015

Personal information
- Date of birth: 18 January 1984 (age 42)
- Place of birth: East Berlin, East Germany
- Height: 1.87 m (6 ft 2 in)
- Position: Goalkeeper

Youth career
- 1992–1999: FC Berlin
- 1999–2001: Hertha BSC
- 2001–2002: Union Berlin

Senior career*
Years	Team	Apps	(Gls)
2002–2014	Union Berlin	232	(0)
2014–2018	1. FC Magdeburg	104	(0)
2018–2019	Wacker Nordhausen	45	(0)
2019–2020	Wacker Nordhausen II	0	(0)
2020	Energie Cottbus	1	(0)
2020–2021	Grün-Weiß Ahrensfelde	7	(0)
Total		389	(0)
- * Club domestic league appearances and goals

Jan Glinker (born 18 January 1984) is a German former professional footballer who played as a goalkeeper.

== Career ==
Glinker joined FSV Wacker 90 Nordhausen in the summer 2018. In October 2019, he was relegated to the club's reserve team alongside four teammates. On 25 January 2020, Glinker moved to Energie Cottbus on a deal for the rest of the season.

== Personal life ==
On 25 July 2020, he moved to German amateur club Grün-Weiß Ahrensfelde, the club from his hometown Barnim and the club which his father, Matthias Glinker, was working at as a doctor.

== Career statistics ==
As of match played 8 March 2020.

Appearances and goals by club, season and competition
Club	Season	League			Cup		Other		Total	
Club	Season	League	Apps	Goals	Apps	Goals	Apps	Goals	Apps	Goals
Union Berlin	2002–03	2. Bundesliga	0	0	0	0	—		0	0
Union Berlin	2003–04	2. Bundesliga	4	0	0	0	—		4	0
Union Berlin	2004–05	Regionalliga Nord	16	0	0	0	—		16	0
Union Berlin	2005–06	NOFV-Oberliga Nord	25	0	—		—		25	0
Union Berlin	2006–07	Regionalliga Nord	32	0	—		—		32	0
Union Berlin	2007–08	Regionalliga Nord	35	0	1	0	—		36	0
Union Berlin	2008–09	3. Liga	37	0	—		—		37	0
Union Berlin	2009–10	2. Bundesliga	33	0	1	0	—		34	0
Union Berlin	2010–11	2. Bundesliga	19	0	1	0	—		20	0
Union Berlin	2011–12	2. Bundesliga	29	0	1	0	—		30	0
Union Berlin	2012–13	2. Bundesliga	1	0	0	0	—		1	0
Union Berlin	2013–14	2. Bundesliga	1	0	0	0	—		1	0
Union Berlin	Total		232	0	4	0	—		236	0
1. FC Magdeburg	2014–15	Regionalliga Nordost	19	0	1	0	—		20	0
1. FC Magdeburg	2015–16	3. Liga	36	0	—		—		36	0
1. FC Magdeburg	2016–17	3. Liga	17	0	0	0	—		17	0
1. FC Magdeburg	2017–18	3. Liga	32	0	0	0	—		32	0
1. FC Magdeburg	Total		104	0	1	0	—		105	0
Wacker Nordhausen	2018–19	Regionalliga Nordost	33	0	—		4	0	37	0
Wacker Nordhausen	2019–20	Regionalliga Nordost	12	0	1	0	1	0	14	0
Wacker Nordhausen	Total		45	0	1	0	5	0	51	0
Energie Cottbus	2019–20	Regionalliga Nordost	1	0	—		—		1	0
Career total			382	0	6	0	5	0	393	0

== Honours ==
- NOFV-Oberliga: 2005–06
- 3. Liga: 2008–09
