= Daniel Haas =

German professional footballer (born 1983)

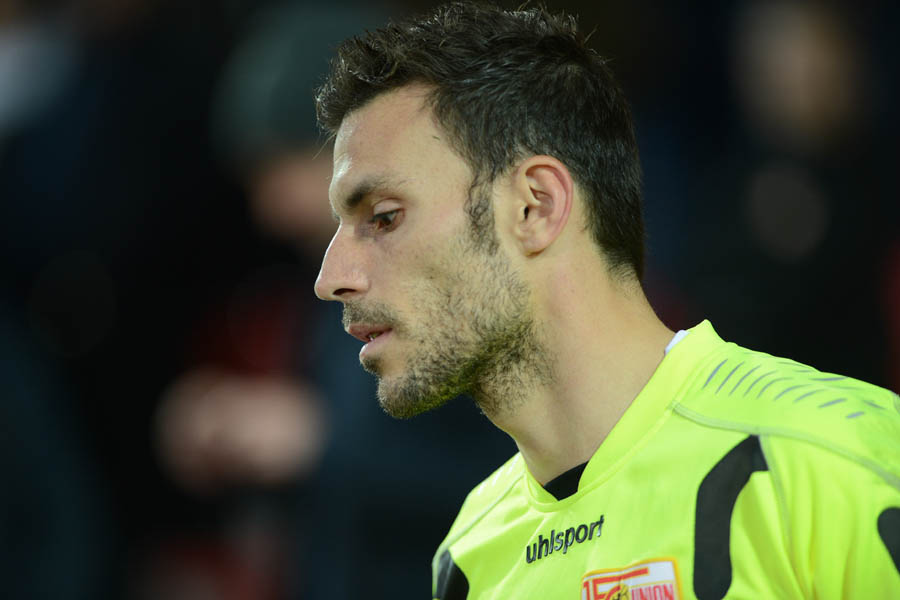
- Haas playing for Union Berlin in 2013

Personal information
- Date of birth: 1 August 1983 (age 43)
- Place of birth: Erlenbach am Main, West Germany
- Height: 1.88 m (6 ft 2 in)
- Position: Goalkeeper

Team information
- Current team: Viktoria Berlin (goalkeeper coach)

Youth career
- 1987–1996: BSC Elsenfeld
- 1996–2001: Eintracht Frankfurt

Senior career*
| Years | Team | Apps | (Gls) |
| 2001–2002 | Eintracht Frankfurt II | 14 | (0) |
| 2001–2002 | Eintracht Frankfurt | 0 | (0) |
| 2002–2005 | Hannover 96 II | 48 | (0) |
| 2004–2007 | Hannover 96 | 1 | (0) |
| 2005 | → 1899 Hoffenheim II (loan) | 13 | (0) |
| 2006–2007 | → 1899 Hoffenheim (loan) | 23 | (0) |
| 2007–2012 | 1899 Hoffenheim | 51 | (0) |
| 2012–2016 | Union Berlin | 115 | (0) |
| 2016–2020 | Erzgebirge Aue | 10 | (0) |
| Total | | 275 | (0) |

International career
| 2001–2002 | Germany U19 | 13 | (0) |
| 2002–2004 | Germany U20 | 11 | (0) |

Managerial career
- 2020–2022: Erzgebirge Aue (goalkeeper coach)
- 2022–: Viktoria Berlin (goalkeeper coach)
- * Club domestic league appearances and goals

Daniel Haas (born 1 August 1983) is a retired German professional footballer who played as a goalkeeper.

== Club career ==
=== 1899 Hoffenheim ===
Haas was one of the only two players who had been with 1899 Hoffenheim since their promotion to the 2. Bundesliga and then to the Bundesliga, the German top-flight. Although Hoffenheim's number 1, he never played over 25 games a season.

Along with Ramazan Özcan or Thorsten Kirschbaum contending for the role of netminder, Haas enjoyed a rather good playing time, with 23 starts in 2006—07 and 17 the next season. After Timo Hildebrand's arrival to the club of the Rhein Neckar Arena early in 2009, he had seen his appearances becomings less frequent as his last game came on 11 April, ending with a send off in the 61st minute of play.

Haas had recovered his starting position during the first half of the 2010–11 season, but was named second choice after the arrival of Tom Starke.

=== Union Berlin ===
On 15 May 2012, Haas' contract with Hoffenheim expired, and he signed a two-year contract with 1. FC Union Berlin, keeping him at the club until 2014. He made his league debut for the club on 6 August 2012 in a 3–3 draw with Kaiserslautern.

=== Erzgebirge Aue ===
Having been released by Union Berlin in July 2016, Haas moved to FC Erzgebirge Aue in the 2. Bundesliga. He made his league debut for the club on 14 October 2016 in a 2–1 win over St. Pauli. However, Haas has played mostly backup to Martin Männel during his time with the club.

== International career ==
Haas is a former youth international for Germany.

== Coaching career ==
Already in January 2020, Haas started his coaching career: after Erzgebirge Aue's goalkeeper coach, Max Urwantschky, left his position, Haas was appointed new goalkeeper coach of the club. However, he would still be available as a player. Haas then decided to retire at the end of the season and continue with his coaching duties at the club.

In June 2022, Haas was appointed new goalkeeper coach of Viktoria Berlin.

== Career statistics ==
=== Club ===
Appearances and goals by club, season and competition
| Club | Season | League | | | German Cup | | Other | | Total | |
| Club | Season | League | Apps | Goals | Apps | Goals | Apps | Goals | Apps | Goals |
|---|---|---|---|---|---|---|---|---|---|---|
| Eintracht Frankfurt | 2001–02 | 2. Bundesliga | 0 | 0 | 0 | 0 | — | | 0 | 0 |
| Hannover 96 | 2002–03 | Bundesliga | 0 | 0 | 0 | 0 | — | | 0 | 0 |
| Hannover 96 | 2003–04 | Bundesliga | 1 | 0 | 0 | 0 | — | | 1 | 0 |
| Hannover 96 | 2004–05 | Bundesliga | 0 | 0 | 0 | 0 | — | | 0 | 0 |
| Hannover 96 | Total | | 1 | 0 | 0 | 0 | — | | 1 | 0 |
| 1899 Hoffenheim | 2005–06 | Regionalliga Süd | 12 | 0 | — | | — | | 12 | 0 |
| 1899 Hoffenheim | 2006–07 | Regionalliga Süd | 23 | 0 | — | | — | | 23 | 0 |
| 1899 Hoffenheim | 2007–08 | 2. Bundesliga | 17 | 0 | 2 | 0 | — | | 19 | 0 |
| 1899 Hoffenheim | 2008–09 | Bundesliga | 18 | 0 | 0 | 0 | — | | 18 | 0 |
| 1899 Hoffenheim | 2009–10 | Bundesliga | 6 | 0 | 0 | 0 | — | | 6 | 0 |
| 1899 Hoffenheim | 2010–11 | Bundesliga | 9 | 0 | 1 | 0 | — | | 10 | 0 |
| 1899 Hoffenheim | 2011–12 | Bundesliga | 1 | 0 | 1 | 0 | — | | 2 | 0 |
| 1899 Hoffenheim | Total | | 86 | 0 | 4 | 0 | — | | 90 | 0 |
| Union Berlin | 2012–13 | 2. Bundesliga | 33 | 0 | 2 | 0 | — | | 35 | 0 |
| Union Berlin | 2013–14 | 2. Bundesliga | 33 | 0 | 3 | 0 | — | | 36 | 0 |
| Union Berlin | 2014–15 | 2. Bundesliga | 29 | 0 | 0 | 0 | — | | 29 | 0 |
| Union Berlin | 2015–16 | 2. Bundesliga | 20 | 0 | 1 | 0 | — | | 21 | 0 |
| Union Berlin | Total | | 115 | 0 | 6 | 0 | — | | 121 | 0 |
| Erzgebirge Aue | 2016–17 | 2. Bundesliga | 0 | 0 | 0 | 0 | — | | 0 | 0 |
| Erzgebirge Aue | 2017–18 | 2. Bundesliga | 8 | 0 | 0 | 0 | 2 | 0 | 10 | 0 |
| Erzgebirge Aue | 2018–19 | 2. Bundesliga | 0 | 0 | 0 | 0 | — | | 0 | 0 |
| Erzgebirge Aue | 2019–20 | 2. Bundesliga | 2 | 0 | 0 | 0 | — | | 2 | 0 |
| Erzgebirge Aue | Total | | 10 | 0 | 0 | 0 | 2 | 0 | 12 | 0 |
| Career total | | | 212 | 0 | 10 | 0 | 2 | 0 | 224 | 0 |
