= List of German football transfers winter 2016–17 =

This is a list of German football transfers in the winter transfer window 2016–17 by club. Only transfers of the Bundesliga, and 2. Bundesliga are included.

== Bundesliga ==
Note: Flags indicate national team as has been defined under FIFA eligibility rules. Players may hold more than one non-FIFA nationality.

=== FC Bayern Munich ===
In:

No.	Pos.	Nation	Player

Out:

No.	Pos.	Nation	Player
28	DF	GER	Holger Badstuber (on loan to FC Schalke 04)
37	FW	USA	Julian Green (to VfB Stuttgart)

=== Borussia Dortmund ===
In:

No.	Pos.	Nation	Player
14	FW	SWE	Alexander Isak (from AIK)

Out:

No.	Pos.	Nation	Player
4	DF	SRB	Neven Subotić (on loan to 1. FC Köln)

=== Bayer 04 Leverkusen ===
In:

No.	Pos.	Nation	Player
9	MF	JAM	Leon Bailey (from K.R.C. Genk)

Out:

No.	Pos.	Nation	Player
27	FW	AUS	Robbie Kruse (to Liaoning Whowin F.C.)
32	DF	GER	Lukas Boeder (on loan to SC Paderborn 07)
--	DF	GRE	Kyriakos Papadopoulos (on loan to Hamburger SV)

=== Borussia Mönchengladbach ===
In:

No.	Pos.	Nation	Player
25	DF	FRA	Timothée Kolodziejczak (from Sevilla FC)

Out:

No.	Pos.	Nation	Player
18	DF	ESP	Álvaro Domínguez (retired)

=== FC Schalke 04 ===
In:

No.	Pos.	Nation	Player
18	MF	GER	Daniel Caligiuri (from VfL Wolfsburg)
19	FW	AUT	Guido Burgstaller (from 1. FC Nürnberg)
24	DF	GER	Holger Badstuber (on loan from FC Bayern Munich)

Out:

No.	Pos.	Nation	Player
3	DF	BRA	Júnior Caiçara (to İstanbul Başakşehir F.K.)
16	FW	GER	Fabian Reese (on loan to Karlsruher SC)
18	FW	GER	Sidney Sam (on loan to SV Darmstadt 98)
34	GK	GER	Fabian Giefer (on loan to Bristol City F.C.)

=== 1. FSV Mainz 05 ===
In:

No.	Pos.	Nation	Player
7	MF	SWE	Robin Quaison (from U.S. Città di Palermo)
10	FW	ESP	Bojan (on loan from Stoke City F.C.)
19	DF	CRO	Marin Šverko (from Karlsruher SC)

Out:

No.	Pos.	Nation	Player
5	MF	ESP	José Rodríguez (on loan to Málaga CF)
10	MF	TUR	Yunus Malli (to VfL Wolfsburg)
23	GK	ITA	Gianluca Curci (released)
27	MF	GER	Christian Clemens (to 1. FC Köln)

=== Hertha BSC ===
In:

No.	Pos.	Nation	Player

Out:

No.	Pos.	Nation	Player
13	MF	GER	Jens Hegeler (to Bristol City F.C.)

=== VfL Wolfsburg ===
In:

No.	Pos.	Nation	Player
6	MF	NED	Riechedly Bazoer (from AFC Ajax)
25	MF	IRN	Ashkan Dejagah (from Al-Arabi)
9	MF	FRA	Paul-Georges Ntep (from Stade Rennais F.C.)
10	MF	TUR	Yunus Malli (from 1. FSV Mainz 05)
18	FW	NGA	Victor Osimhen (from Ultimate Strikers Academy)

Out:

No.	Pos.	Nation	Player
7	MF	GER	Daniel Caligiuri (to FC Schalke)
10	MF	GER	Julian Draxler (to Paris Saint-Germain)
25	FW	CRO	Josip Brekalo (on loan to VfB Stuttgart)

=== 1. FC Köln ===
In:

No.	Pos.	Nation	Player
2	DF	SRB	Neven Subotić (on loan from Borussia Dortmund)
17	MF	GER	Christian Clemens (from 1. FSV Mainz 05)

Out:

No.	Pos.	Nation	Player
15	DF	ALB	Mërgim Mavraj (to Hamburger SV)
25	DF	SRB	Filip Mladenović (on loan to Standard Liège)

=== Hamburger SV ===
In:

No.	Pos.	Nation	Player
3	DF	ALB	Mërgim Mavraj (from 1. FC Köln)
9	DF	GRE	Kyriakos Papadopoulos (on loan from Bayer 04 Leverkusen)

Out:

No.	Pos.	Nation	Player
3	DF	BRA	Cléber (to Santos FC)
23	MF	CRO	Alen Halilović (on loan to UD Las Palmas)

=== FC Ingolstadt 04 ===
In:

No.	Pos.	Nation	Player

Out:

No.	Pos.	Nation	Player
17	DF	GER	Hauke Wahl (on loan to 1. FC Heidenheim)

=== FC Augsburg ===
In:

No.	Pos.	Nation	Player
5	MF	GER	Moritz Leitner (from S.S. Lazio)

Out:

No.	Pos.	Nation	Player
4	DF	GHA	Daniel Opare (on loan to RC Lens)

=== Werder Bremen ===
In:

No.	Pos.	Nation	Player
6	MF	DEN	Thomas Delaney (from F.C. Copenhagen)

Out:

No.	Pos.	Nation	Player
11	FW	GER	Lennart Thy (on loan to FC St. Pauli)
21	DF	SEN	Fallou Diagne (on loan to FC Metz)
25	MF	GRE	Athanasios Petsos (on loan to Fulham F.C.)
39	MF	GER	Lukas Fröde (to Würzburger Kickers)

=== SV Darmstadt 98 ===
In:

No.	Pos.	Nation	Player
15	FW	USA	Terrence Boyd (from RB Leipzig)
33	FW	GER	Sidney Sam (on loan from Schalke 04)

Out:

No.	Pos.	Nation	Player

=== 1899 Hoffenheim ===
In:

No.	Pos.	Nation	Player

Out:

No.	Pos.	Nation	Player
11	MF	SWE	Jiloan Hamad (to Hammarby Fotboll)
20	DF	KOR	Kim Jin-su (to Jeonbuk Hyundai Motors FC)
34	MF	TUR	Barış Atik (on loan to SK Sturm Graz)

=== Eintracht Frankfurt ===
In:

No.	Pos.	Nation	Player
18	MF	GER	Max Besuschkow (from VfB Stuttgart)
24	FW	GER	Marius Wolf (on loan from Hannover 96)
29	DF	ECU	Andersson Ordóñez (from Barcelona S.C.)

Out:

No.	Pos.	Nation	Player
18	MF	GER	Johannes Flum (to FC St. Pauli)

=== SC Freiburg ===
In:

No.	Pos.	Nation	Player

Out:

No.	Pos.	Nation	Player
16	MF	NOR	Mats Møller Dæhli (on loan to FC St. Pauli)
29	MF	FRA	Charles-Elie Laprévotte (to 1. FC Magdeburg)
35	MF	GEO	Lucas Hufnagel (on loan to 1. FC Nürnberg)

=== RB Leipzig ===
In:

No.	Pos.	Nation	Player
17	DF	FRA	Dayot Upamecano (from FC Red Bull Salzburg)

Out:

No.	Pos.	Nation	Player
5	DF	GRE	Kyriakos Papadopoulos (loan return to Bayer 04 Leverkusen)
18	FW	USA	Terrence Boyd (to SV Darmstadt 98)
--	MF	GER	Vitaly Janelt (on loan to VfL Bochum)

== 2. Bundesliga ==
=== VfB Stuttgart ===
In:

No.	Pos.	Nation	Player
4	DF	FRA	Jérôme Onguéné (from FC Sochaux-Montbéliard)
22	MF	GHA	Ebenezer Ofori (from AIK Fotboll)
24	FW	CRO	Josip Brekalo (on loan from VfL Wolfsburg)
37	FW	USA	Julian Green (from FC Bayern Munich)

Out:

No.	Pos.	Nation	Player
4	DF	BIH	Toni Šunjić (on loan to U.S. Città di Palermo)
14	DF	GER	Philip Heise (to Dynamo Dresden)
23	MF	GER	Max Besuschkow (to Eintracht Frankfurt)
41	DF	GER	Stephen Sama (to SpVgg Greuther Fürth)

=== Hannover 96 ===
In:

No.	Pos.	Nation	Player

Out:

No.	Pos.	Nation	Player
15	MF	GER	André Hoffmann (on loan to Fortuna Düsseldorf)
21	FW	GER	Marius Wolf (on loan to Eintracht Frankfurt)
29	FW	SEN	Babacar Guèye (on loan to S.V. Zulte Waregem)

=== 1. FC Nürnberg ===
In:

No.	Pos.	Nation	Player
8	MF	GEO	Lucas Hufnagel (on loan from SC Freiburg)

Out:

No.	Pos.	Nation	Player
5	MF	KOS	Enis Alushi (on loan to Maccabi Haifa F.C.)
9	FW	AUT	Guido Burgstaller (to FC Schalke 04)
27	FW	GER	Philipp Hercher (on loan to VfR Aalen)

=== FC St. Pauli ===
In:

No.	Pos.	Nation	Player
14	MF	NOR	Mats Møller Dæhli (on loan from SC Freiburg)
18	FW	GER	Lennart Thy (on loan from SV Werder Bremen)
23	MF	GER	Johannes Flum (from Eintracht Frankfurt)

Out:

No.	Pos.	Nation	Player
19	DF	DEN	Jacob Rasmussen (to Rosenborg BK)
34	FW	GER	Marvin Ducksch (on loan to Holstein Kiel)

=== VfL Bochum ===
In:

No.	Pos.	Nation	Player
20	MF	GER	Vitaly Janelt (on loan from RB Leipzig)

Out:

No.	Pos.	Nation	Player
11	FW	LTU	Arvydas Novikovas (to Jagiellonia Białystok)
16	DF	GER	Gökhan Gül (to Fortuna Düsseldorf)

=== 1. FC Union Berlin ===
In:

No.	Pos.	Nation	Player
--	FW	GER	Sebastian Polter (from Queens Park Rangers F.C.)

Out:

No.	Pos.	Nation	Player
2	MF	GER	Christopher Quiring (to F.C. Hansa Rostock)
9	FW	GER	Sören Brandy (to Arminia Bielefeld)
21	FW	GER	Collin Quaner (to Huddersfield Town A.F.C.)
25	DF	GER	Christopher Lenz (on loan to Holstein Kiel)

=== Karlsruher SC ===
In:

No.	Pos.	Nation	Player
40	FW	GER	Fabian Reese (on loan from FC Schalke 04)

Out:

No.	Pos.	Nation	Player
37	DF	CRO	Marin Šverko (to 1. FSV Mainz 05)

=== Eintracht Braunschweig ===
In:

No.	Pos.	Nation	Player

Out:

No.	Pos.	Nation	Player

=== SpVgg Greuther Fürth ===
In:

No.	Pos.	Nation	Player
2	DF	GER	Stephen Sama (from VfB Stuttgart)

Out:

No.	Pos.	Nation	Player
16	MF	CRO	Damjan Đoković (to Spezia Calcio)
25	MF	SLE	George Davies (on loan to Floridsdorfer AC)
29	DF	GER	Sebastian Heidinger (to SC Paderborn 07)

=== 1. FC Kaiserslautern ===
In:

No.	Pos.	Nation	Player

Out:

No.	Pos.	Nation	Player
13	MF	SVK	Róbert Pich (released)

=== 1. FC Heidenheim ===
In:

No.	Pos.	Nation	Player
—	DF	GER	Hauke Wahl (on loan from FC Ingolstadt 04)
—	GK	GER	Vitus Eicher (from TSV 1860 Munich)

Out:

No.	Pos.	Nation	Player
9	FW	FRA	Smail Morabit (to FSV Frankfurt)
17	MF	GHA	David Atanga (loan return to FC Red Bull Salzburg)

=== Arminia Bielefeld ===
In:

No.	Pos.	Nation	Player
--	FW	GER	Sören Brandy (from 1. FC Union Berlin)
--	MF	GER	Reinhold Yabo (on loan from FC Red Bull Salzburg)

Out:

No.	Pos.	Nation	Player
30	MF	POL	Michał Mak (loan return to Lechia Gdańsk)

=== SV Sandhausen ===
In:

No.	Pos.	Nation	Player

Out:

No.	Pos.	Nation	Player
18	MF	GER	Steven Zellner (to 1. FC Saarbrücken)

=== Fortuna Düsseldorf ===
In:

No.	Pos.	Nation	Player
18	DF	GER	Gökhan Gül (from VfL Bochum)
—	MF	GER	André Hoffmann (on loan from Hannover 96)

Out:

No.	Pos.	Nation	Player
22	FW	BEL	Maecky Ngombo (on loan to Milton Keynes Dons F.C.)

=== 1860 Munich ===
In:

No.	Pos.	Nation	Player

Out:

No.	Pos.	Nation	Player
1	GK	GER	Vitus Eicher (to 1. FC Heidenheim)

=== Dynamo Dresden ===
In:

No.	Pos.	Nation	Player
--	FW	GER	Marcos Álvarez (free agent)
16	DF	GER	Philip Heise (from VfB Stuttgart)

Out:

No.	Pos.	Nation	Player
9	FW	FIN	Tim Väyrynen (to F.C. Hansa Rostock)

=== Erzgebirge Aue ===
In:

No.	Pos.	Nation	Player
28	FW	KOS	Albert Bunjaku (from FC St. Gallen)

Out:

No.	Pos.	Nation	Player

=== Würzburger Kickers ===
In:

No.	Pos.	Nation	Player
--	MF	GER	Lukas Fröde (from Werder Bremen)

Out:

No.	Pos.	Nation	Player
3	DF	GER	Dominik Nothnagel (to SV Wehen Wiesbaden)
9	FW	IRN	Amir Shapourzadeh (retired)
22	DF	GER	Dennis Russ (to FSV Frankfurt)

== See also ==
- 2016–17 Bundesliga
- 2016–17 2. Bundesliga
