= Eroll Zejnullahu =

Kosovan footballer (born 1994)

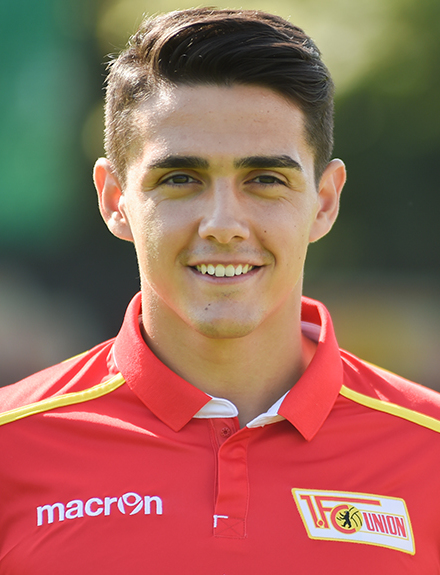
- Zejnullahu with Union Berlin in 2016

Personal information
- Date of birth: 19 October 1994 (age 32)
- Place of birth: Berlin, Germany
- Height: 1.80 m (5 ft 11 in)
- Position: Attacking midfielder

Team information
- Current team: Würzburger Kickers
- Number: 10

Youth career
- Fortuna Biesdorf
- –2008: Internationale Berlin
- 2008–2011: Tasmania Gropiusstadt
- 2011–2012: Hertha Zehlendorf
- 2012–2013: Union Berlin

Senior career*
Years	Team	Apps	(Gls)
2012–2015	Union Berlin II	31	(5)
2013–2019	Union Berlin	66	(1)
2017–2018	→ Sandhausen (loan)	13	(0)
2019–2020	Carl Zeiss Jena	11	(0)
2021	Nitra	8	(0)
2021–2022	Berliner AK	27	(2)
2022–2023	SpVgg Bayreuth	31	(6)
2023–2024	1860 Munich	21	(1)
2024–2025	SpVgg Bayreuth	33	(4)
2025–	Würzburger Kickers	19	(2)

International career^{‡}
2014–	Kosovo	4	(0)
- * Club domestic league appearances and goals as of 28 June 2026 ‡ National team caps and goals as of 11 June 2021

Eroll Zejnullahu (born 19 October 1994) is a professional footballer who plays as an attacking midfielder for German 3. Liga club Würzburger Kickers. Born in Germany, he represents Kosovo internationally.

== Club career ==
=== Youth career ===
Zejnullahu began his youth career at local side Tasmania Berlin. In 2011, he then moved to Hertha Zehlendorf.

=== Union Berlin ===
On 1 July 2012. Zejnullahu signed to Union Berlin's under-19 team. In 2012, he made his debut with Union Berlin II. On 1 February 2013, he made his debut with the first team in a 2. Bundesliga match against Sandhausen coming on as a substitute in the 89th minute in place of Michael Parensen.

==== Loan to Sandhausen ====
On 18 June 2017, Zejnullahu joined 2. Bundesliga side Sandhausen on loan, joining compatriot Leart Paqarada.

=== Carl Zeiss Jena ===
On 2 August 2019, Zejnullahu joined Carl Zeiss Jena on a free transfer until 2021.

=== FC Nitra ===
In January 2021, Zejnullahu joined Nitra.

=== Bayreuth ===
In June 2022, Zejnullahu signed with SpVgg Bayreuth.

=== 1860 Munich ===
On 27 June 2023, Zejnullahu moved to 1860 Munich. He started the 2023–24 season with a goal against 1. FC Stockheim in the Bavarian Cup.

== International career ==
On 19 May 2014, Zejnullahu received a call-up from Kosovo for a friendly match against Turkey and Senegal and on 25 May 2014, he made his debut with Kosovo in a friendly match against Senegal replacing Albion Avdijaj in the 55th minute.

== Career statistics ==
=== Club ===
As of 2 August 2023

Appearances and goals by club, season and competition
Club	Season	League			National cup		Other		Total	
Club	Season	Division	Apps	Goals	Apps	Goals	Apps	Goals	Apps	Goals
Union Berlin	2012–13	2. Bundesliga	2	0	0	0	—		2	0
Union Berlin	2013–14	2. Bundesliga	3	0	0	0	—		3	0
Union Berlin	2014–15	2. Bundesliga	23	0	0	0	—		23	0
Union Berlin	2015–16	2. Bundesliga	26	1	0	0	—		26	1
Union Berlin	2016–17	2. Bundesliga	12	0	2	0	—		14	0
Union Berlin	Total		66	1	2	0	0	0	68	1
Union Berlin II	2012–13	Regionalliga Nordost	6	0	—		—		6	0
Union Berlin II	2013–14	Regionalliga Nordost	21	4	—		—		21	4
Union Berlin II	2014–15	Regionalliga Nordost	4	1	—		—		4	1
Union Berlin II	Total		31	5	—		—		31	5
SV Sandhausen (loan)	2017–18	2. Bundesliga	13	0	1	0	—		14	0
SV Sandhausen II (loan)	2017–18	Oberliga Baden-Württemberg	3	1	—		—		3	1
Carl Zeiss Jena	2019–20	3. Liga	11	1	0	0	—		11	1
Nitra	2020–21	Slovak Super Liga	8	0	0	0	—		8	0
Berliner AK	2021–22	Regionalliga Nordost	27	2	—		—		27	2
SpVgg Bayreuth	2022–23	3. Liga	31	6	1	0	—		32	6
1860 Munich	2023–24	3. Liga	0	0	0	0	1 (Note: Appearances in the Bavarian Cup)	1	1	1
Career total			190	16	4	0	1	1	195	17

=== International ===
As of match played on 11 June 2021

Appearances and goals by national team and year
National team	Year	Apps	Goals
Kosovo	2014	1	0
Kosovo	2015	2	0
Kosovo	2021	2	0
Total		4	0
