= 2013–14 1. FC Union Berlin season =

Union Berlin
2013–14 season
- Head Coach: Uwe Neuhaus
- Stadium: Stadion An der Alten Försterei
- 2. Bundesliga: 9th
- DFB-Pokal: Round of 16
- Average home league attendance: 19,889

The 2013–14 1. FC Union Berlin season is the club's fifth consecutive season in the 2. Bundesliga.

== Background ==
Union Berlin won the 2008–09 3. Liga. Since promotion, Union Berlin has finished 12th in 2009–10, 11th in 2010–11, and seventh in 2011–12 and 2012–13.

=== Transfers ===
==== In ====
Pos.	Name	Age	From	Type	Transfer Window	Contract ends	Transfer fee	Ref.
MF	Damir Kreilach	24	HNK Rijeka	Transfer	Summer	2016	€200,000	
DF	Fabian Schönheim	26	1. FSV Mainz 05	Transfer	Summer	2014	Undisclosed	
DF	Roberto Punčec	21	Maccabi Tel Aviv	Transfer	Summer	2014	Undisclosed	
DF	Mario Eggimann	32	Hannover 96	Transfer	Summer	2015	Free transfer	
FW	Martin Dausch	27	VfR Aalen	Transfer	Summer	2015	Free transfer	
MF	Benjamin Köhler	32	1. FC Kaiserslautern	Transfer	Summer	2014	Undisclosed	
MF	Abdallah Gomaa	17	ENPPI SC	Loan transfer	Winter	2014		

==== Out ====
Pos.	Name	Age	Moving to	Type	Transfer Window	Transfer fee	Ref.
MF	Christoph Menz	24	Dynamo Dresden	Transfer	Summer	Free transfer	
DF	Daniel Göhlert	32	TSV Einheit Claußnitz	Transfer	Summer	Free transfer	
GK	Marcel Höttecke	26	Berliner AK 07	Transfer	Summer	Free transfer	
FW	Marcel Höttecke	28	Wolfsberger AC	Transfer	Winter	Released	

== Competitions ==
=== 2. Bundesliga ===
Union Berlin's season started on 21 July with a 2–1 loss to VfL Bochum. Damir Kreilach scored for Union Berlin and Danny Latza and Marcel Maltritz scored for Bochum.

==== League table ====
Pos	Team	Pld	W	D	L	GF	GA	GD	Pts
7	1860 Munich	34	13	9	12	38	41	−3	48
8	FC St. Pauli	34	13	9	12	44	49	−5	48
9	Union Berlin	34	11	11	12	48	47	+1	44
10	FC Ingolstadt	34	11	11	12	34	33	+1	44
11	VfR Aalen	34	11	11	12	36	39	−3	44

Source: kicker.de
Rules for classification: 1) points; 2) goal difference; 3) number of goals scored.

==== Matches ====
Win Draw Loss

Win	Draw	Loss

Match	Date	Time	Opponent	Venue	Result F–A	Scorers	Attendance	Ref.
1	21 July 2013	15:30	VfL Bochum	Home	1–2	Kreilach 86'	18,823	
2	26 July 2013	18:30	Arminia Bielefeld	Away	1–1	Nemec 25'	15,488	
3	9 August 2013	18:30	Dynamo Dresden	Away	3–1	Brandy 23', Mattuschka 25', Kreilach 37'	29,223	
4	19 August 2013	20:15	Fortuna Düsseldorf	Home	2–1	Nemec 43', 55'	20,846	
5	25 August 2013	13:30	FSV Frankfurt	Away	1–1	Kreilach 57'	4,436	
6	31 August 2013	13:00	FC St. Pauli	Home	3–2	Mattuschka 36' (pen.), Nemec 59', Terodde 86'	21,717	
7	15 September 2013	13:00	Ingolstadt 04	Away	1–0	Brandy 48'	5,909	
8	20 September 2013	18:30	Greuther Fürth	Home	2–4	Köhler 17', Terodde 86'	19,707	
9	28 September 2013	13:00	Paderborn 07	Away	3–0	Brandy 41', 79', Mattuschka 85'	7,512	
10	4 October 2013	18:30	SV Sandhausen	Home	3–0	Mattuschka 25', Terodde 47', Brandy 66'	18,756	
11	18 October 2013	18:30	Energie Cottbus	Away	0–0	—	16,194	
12	27 October 2013	13:30	Erzgebirge Aue	Home	1–0	Mattuschka 62'	20,541	
13	4 November 2013	20:15	1. FC Köln	Away	0–4	—	45,000	
14	9 November 2013	13:00	Karlsruher SC	Home	0–0	—	20,757	
15	23 November 2013	13:00	1. FC Kaiserslautern	Away	0–3	—	33,284	
16	29 November 2013	18:30	VfR Aalen	Home	1–3	Mattuschka 62'	17,236	
17	7 December 2013	13:00	1860 München	Away	1–2	Mattuschka 74' (pen.)	18,400	
18	14 December 2013	13:00	VfL Bochum	Away	4–0	Quiring 13', 36', Terodde 47', Köhler 52'	13,117	
19	21 December 2013	13:00	Arminia Bielefeld	Home	4–2	Eggimann 18', Kohlmann 26', Nemec 42', Mattuschka 49' (pen.)	20,314	
20	8 February 2014	13:00	Dynamo Dresden	Home	0–0	—	21,717	
21	14 February 2014	18:30	Fortuna Düsseldorf	Away	1–1	Erat 35'	30,678	
22	21 February 2014	18:30	FSV Frankfurt	Home	2–0	Mattuschka 39' (pen.), Schönheim 76'	17,082	
23	3 March 2014	20:15	FC St. Pauli	Away	1–2	Terodde 58'	29,633	
24	8 March 2014	13:00	Ingolstadt 04	Home	1–1	Mattuschka 90+1' (pen.)	18,412	
25	16 March 2014	13:30	Greuther Fürth	Away	1–1	Brandy 43'	11,545	
26	21 March 2014	18:30	Paderborn 07	Home	1–1	Brandy 53'	18,820	
27	25 March 2014	18:30	SV Sandhausen	Away	1–2	Quiring 4'	4,050	
28	31 March 2014	18:30	Energie Cottbus	Home	2–0	Brandy 28', 82'	20,766	
29	6 April 2014	13:30	Erzgebirge Aue	Away	2–3	Mattuschka 24' (pen.), Skrzybski 40'	12,000	
30	11 April 2014	18:30	1. FC Köln	Home	1–2	Dausch 10'	21,000	
31	19 April 2014	13:00	Karlsruher SC	Away	2–3	Köhler 62' (pen.), Mattuschka 78' (pen.)	15,557	
32	28 April 2014	20:15	1. FC Kaiserslautern	Home	1–1	Brandy 9'	19,185	
33	4 May 2014	13:30	VfR Aalen	Away	0–3	—	7,579	
34	11 May 2014	13:30	1860 München	Home	1–1	Kohlmann 49'	21,717	

=== DFB–Pokal ===
The draw for the first round of the DFB-Pokal happened on 15 June. Union Berlin were drawn against Jahn Regensburg. The match took place on 5 August and ended up as a 2–1 win for Union Berlin. Sören Brandy and Benjamin Köhler scored for Union Berlin and Abdenour Amachaibou scored for Jahn Regensburg. Union Berlin were drawn against VfL Osnabrück on 10 August for the second round. The match took place on 25 September and ended up as a 1–0 win for Union Berlin. Torsten Mattuschka scored the only goal of the match. Union Berlin were drawn against 1. FC Kaiserslautern for the round of 16 on 29 September. The match took place on 3 December with Kaiserslautern winning 3–0 with goals from Willi Orban, Simon Zoller, and Marcel Gaus.

==== Matches ====
Win	Draw	Loss

Round	Date	Time	Opponent	Venue	Result F–A	Scorers	Attendance	Ref.
First round	5 August 2013	18:30	Jahn Regensburg	Away	2–1	Brandy 21', Köhler 42'	6,249	
Second round	25 September 2013	20:30	VfL Osnabrück	Away	1–0	Mattuschka 14' (pen.)	11,194	
Round of 16	3 December 2013	19:00	1. FC Kaiserslautern	Home	0–3	—	21,717	
