= 2010–11 TSG 1899 Hoffenheim season =

TSG 1899 Hoffenheim
2010–11 season
- Manager: Ralf Rangnick; Marco Pezzaiuoli
- Stadium: Rhein-Neckar-Arena
- Bundesliga: 11th
- DFB-Pokal: Quarter finals
- Top goalscorer: Gylfi Sigurðsson (9)
| Home colours | Away colours |

The 2010–11 Bundesliga season was the 112th in Hoffenheim's history and third consecutive season in the Bundesliga. They finished in eleventh, accumulating a total of 43 points over 34 games.

== First-team squad ==
Note: Flags indicate national team as defined under FIFA eligibility rules; some limited exceptions apply. Players may hold more than one non-FIFA nationality.

| No. | Pos. | Nation | Player |
|---|---|---|---|
| 1 | GK | GER | Daniel Haas |
| 2 | DF | GER | Andreas Beck |
| 3 | DF | GER | Matthias Jaissle |
| 5 | DF | GER | Marvin Compper |
| 6 | MF | GER | Sebastian Rudy |
| 7 | MF | GER | Boris Vukčević |
| 8 | MF | AUT | David Alaba |
| 10 | FW | NED | Ryan Babel |
| 11 | MF | ISL | Gylfi Sigurðsson |
| 14 | DF | CRO | Josip Šimunić |
| 15 | FW | BRA | Peniel Mlapa |
| 17 | MF | GER | Tobias Weis |
| 19 | FW | BIH | Vedad Ibišević (Captain) |
| 20 | FW | NGR | Chinedu Obasi |
| 22 | MF | BRA | Roberto Firmino |

| No. | Pos. | Nation | Player |
|---|---|---|---|
| 23 | MF | BIH | Sejad Salihović |
| 25 | DF | GHA | Isaac Vorsah |
| 26 | DF | AUT | Andreas Ibertsberger |
| 27 | GK | AUT | Ramazan Özcan |
| 28 | DF | NED | Edson Braafheid |
| 29 | DF | DEN | Jannik Vestergaard |
| 30 | GK | GER | Jens Grahl |
| 31 | MF | GER | Andreas Ludwig |
| 33 | MF | GER | Tom Starke |
| 34 | FW | GER | Denis Thomalla |
| 36 | MF | GER | Dominik Kaiser |
| 37 | DF | GER | Manuel Gulde |
| 38 | FW | GER | Kai Herdling |
| 39 | MF | GER | Pascal Groß |

== Competitions ==
=== Bundesliga ===
==== League table ====
| Pos | Team | Pld | W | D | L | GF | GA | GD | Pts |
|---|---|---|---|---|---|---|---|---|---|
| 9 | SC Freiburg | 34 | 13 | 5 | 16 | 41 | 50 | −9 | 44 |
| 10 | 1. FC Köln | 34 | 13 | 5 | 16 | 47 | 62 | −15 | 44 |
| 11 | 1899 Hoffenheim | 34 | 11 | 10 | 13 | 50 | 50 | 0 | 43 |
| 12 | VfB Stuttgart | 34 | 12 | 6 | 16 | 60 | 59 | +1 | 42 |
| 13 | Werder Bremen | 34 | 10 | 11 | 13 | 47 | 61 | −14 | 41 |

Source: kicker
Rules for classification: 1) points; 2) goal difference; 3) number of goals scored.
