= Michael Parensen =

German footballer

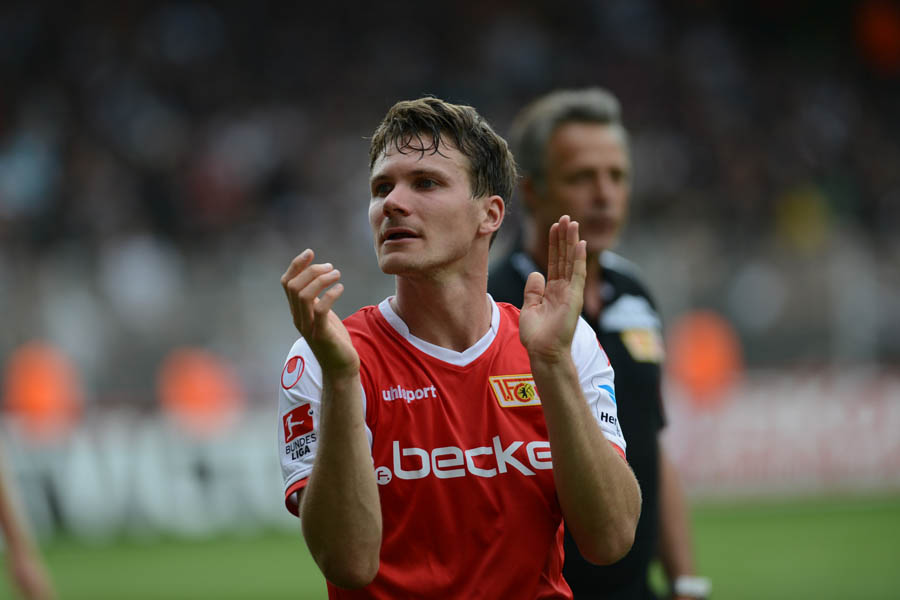
- Parensen playing for Union Berlin in 2013.

Personal information
- Date of birth: 24 June 1986 (age 40)
- Place of birth: Bad Driburg, West Germany
- Height: 1.80 m (5 ft 11 in)
- Position: Defender

Youth career
- VfL Eversen
- TuS Bad Driburg
- –2002: SC Paderborn
- 2002–2004: Borussia Dortmund

Senior career*
Years	Team	Apps	(Gls)
2004–2007	Borussia Dortmund II	30	(1)
2007–2009	1. FC Köln II	50	(3)
2008–2009	1. FC Köln	0	(0)
2009–2020	Union Berlin	234	(8)
2014	→ Union Berlin II	1	(0)
Total		315	(12)

International career
2001–2002	Germany U16	8	(0)
2002–2003	Germany U17	7	(1)
2003	Germany U18	2	(0)
- * Club domestic league appearances and goals

Michael Parensen (born 24 June 1986) is a German former professional footballer who played as a defender for Borussia Dortmund II, 1. FC Köln II, 1. FC Köln Union Berlin and Union Berlin II. He retired at the end of the 2019–20 season.

== Career statistics ==
Appearances and goals by club, season and competition
Club	Season	League			National Cup		Other		Total	
Club	Season	Division	Apps	Goals	Apps	Goals	Apps	Goals	Apps	Goals
Borussia Dortmund II	2004–05	Regionalliga Nord	13	1	0	0	–		13	1
Borussia Dortmund II	2006–07	Regionalliga Nord	17	0	0	0	–		17	0
Borussia Dortmund II	Total		30	1	0	0	0	0	30	1
1. FC Köln II	2007–08	Oberliga Nordrhein	34	2	–		–		34	2
1. FC Köln II	2008–09	Regionalliga West	16	1	–		–		16	1
1. FC Köln II	Total		50	3	0	0	0	0	50	3
Union Berlin	2008–09	3. Liga	18	0	0	0	–		18	0
Union Berlin	2009–10	2. Bundesliga	24	0	1	0	–		25	0
Union Berlin	2010–11	2. Bundesliga	14	0	0	0	–		14	0
Union Berlin	2011–12	2. Bundesliga	29	2	0	0	–		29	2
Union Berlin	2012–13	2. Bundesliga	23	3	1	0	–		24	3
Union Berlin	2013–14	2. Bundesliga	28	0	3	0	–		31	0
Union Berlin	2014–15	2. Bundesliga	26	1	0	0	–		26	1
Union Berlin	2015–16	2. Bundesliga	29	0	1	0	–		30	0
Union Berlin	2016–17	2. Bundesliga	14	0	1	0	–		15	0
Union Berlin	2017–18	2. Bundesliga	11	1	1	0	–		12	1
Union Berlin	2018–19	2. Bundesliga	9	0	1	0	2 (Note: Appearance(s) in play-offs for Bundesliga)	0	12	0
Union Berlin	2019–20	Bundesliga	9	1	4	0	–		13	1
Union Berlin	Total		234	8	13	0	2	0	249	8
Union Berlin II	2014–15	Regionalliga Nordost	1	0	–		–		1	0
Career total			315	12	13	0	2	0	330	12
