= Benjamin Köhler =

German footballer

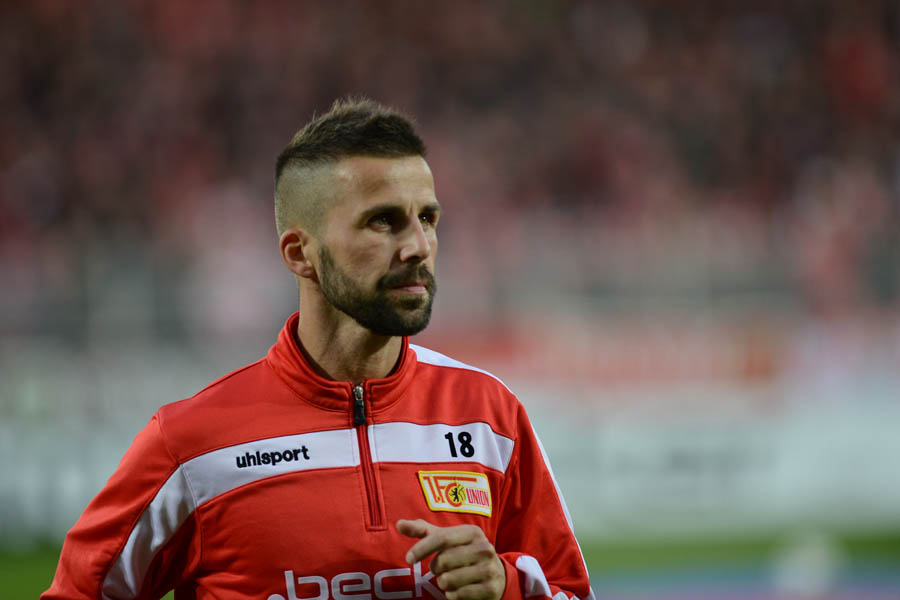
- Köhler in 2013

Personal information
- Date of birth: 4 August 1980 (age 46)
- Place of birth: West Berlin, West Germany
- Height: 1.72 m (5 ft 8 in)
- Positions: Attacking midfielder; left winger

Youth career
- 1986–1993: Normannia 08 Berlin
- 1993–1997: Reinickendorfer Füchse
- 1997–1998: 1. FC Lübars
- 1998–2000: Hertha BSC

Senior career*
Years	Team	Apps	(Gls)
2000–2003	Hertha BSC	2	(0)
2001–2002	→ MSV Duisburg (loan)	22	(1)
2003–2004	Rot-Weiss Essen	34	(13)
2004–2013	Eintracht Frankfurt	229	(32)
2013	1. FC Kaiserslautern	8	(1)
2013–2017	Union Berlin	49	(5)
Total		344	(52)

International career
	Germany U21	3	(0)
- * Club domestic league appearances and goals

Benjamin Köhler (born 4 August 1980) is a German former professional footballer. Köhler, who is left-footed, could play flexibly on all offensive positions but often found himself on the left wing.

== Career ==
After getting just one appearance with Hertha BSC he had a one-year loan stint with Duisburg; he finally moved to Regionalliga side Rot-Weiss Essen where he scored 13 goals. After that season, Eintracht Frankfurt scouted and finally signed him. In the promotion season he netted seven goals in 29 games. In the next season he had as many games while scoring three goals, one of which was among the goal of the week choices.

On 7 February 2015, his Union Berlin team-mates held a tribute to him in support after his diagnosis of stomach cancer after the seventh minute of the game, a 2–1 defeat of VfL Bochum. They received an ovation from both the fans and players from both teams. His contract was later renewed, even after the diagnosis. In July 2015 it was announced that he had beaten stomach cancer and he was given the all clear. In April 2016, Köhler's contract was extended until summer 2017.

At the end of his contract in summer 2017, Köhler's contract at Union Berlin was not renewed; moreover, he decided to put an end to his career because of knee issues. Following the end of his playing career, Köhler started working in an ice cream shop.

== Career statistics ==
Appearances and goals by club, season and competition
Club	Season	League			DFB-Pokal		Other		Total	
Club	Season	Division	Apps	Goals	Apps	Goals	Apps	Goals	Apps	Goals
Hertha BSC	2000–01	Bundesliga	2	0	0	0	0	0	2	0
Hertha BSC	2001–02	Bundesliga	0	0	0	0	0	0	0	0
Hertha BSC	2002–03	Bundesliga	0	0	0	0	0	0	0	0
Hertha BSC	Total		2	0	0	0	0	0	2	0
MSV Duisburg (loan)	2001–02	2. Bundesliga	22	1	1	0	0	0	23	1
Rot-Weiß Essen	2003–04	Regionalliga Nord	34	13	—		0	0	34	13
Eintracht Frankfurt	2004–05	2. Bundesliga	29	7	2	0	0	0	31	7
Eintracht Frankfurt	2005–06	Bundesliga	29	3	5	0	0	0	34	3
Eintracht Frankfurt	2006–07	Bundesliga	23	1	5	0	6 (Note: Appearances in UEFA Cup)	1	34	2
Eintracht Frankfurt	2007–08	Bundesliga	29	3	2	0	0	0	31	3
Eintracht Frankfurt	2008–09	Bundesliga	20	3	1	0	0	0	21	3
Eintracht Frankfurt	2009–10	Bundesliga	31	4	1	0	0	0	32	4
Eintracht Frankfurt	2010–11	Bundesliga	30	2	3	0	0	0	33	2
Eintracht Frankfurt	2011–12	Bundesliga	32	9	2	0	0	0	34	9
Eintracht Frankfurt	2012–13	Bundesliga	6	0	1	0	0	0	7	0
Eintracht Frankfurt	Total		229	32	22	0	6	1	257	33
1. FC Kaiserslautern	2012–13	2. Bundesliga	8	1	0	0	0	0	8	1
Union Berlin	2013–14	2. Bundesliga	29	3	2	1	0	0	31	4
Union Berlin	2014–15	2. Bundesliga	18	2	0	0	0	0	18	2
Union Berlin	2015–16	2. Bundesliga	2	0	0	0	0	0	2	0
Union Berlin	Total		49	5	2	1	0	0	51	6
Career total			344	52	25	1	6	1	375	54
