= Leonard Koch =

German football player

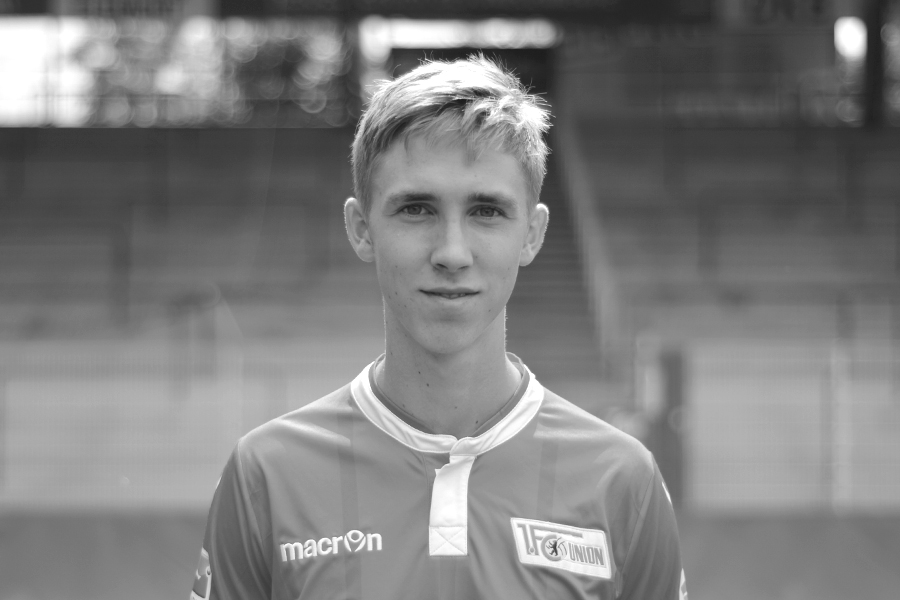
- Koch in 2015

Personal information
- Date of birth: 23 May 1995 (age 31)
- Place of birth: Berlin, Germany
- Height: 1.85 m (6 ft 1 in)
- Position: Midfielder

Team information
- Current team: SV Lichtenberg 47
- Number: 14

Youth career
- –2007: Empor Berlin
- 2007–2009: Hertha BSC
- 2009–2014: Union Berlin

Senior career*
Years	Team	Apps	(Gls)
2013–2015	Union Berlin II	22	(1)
2013–2016	Union Berlin	1	(0)
2016–2022	SV Babelsberg 03	77	(6)
2022–2023	SV Lichtenberg 47	13	(1)
- * Club domestic league appearances and goals as of 15 June 2025

Leonard Koch (born 23 May 1995) is a German footballer who last played as a midfielder for SV Lichtenberg 47.

== Career ==
=== Early career ===
Koch was at Empor Berlin until 30 June 2007 before joining Hertha BSC from 1 July 2007 to 30 June 2009.

=== Union Berlin ===
Koch joined Union Berlin in 2009 and joined the reserve team in 2013 when he made an appearance during the 2013–14 season. He joined the first team squad in 2013. However, he did not make any appearances for the first team until the 2014–15 season when he came on as an 88th-minute substitute for Sebastian Polter in a 2–0 win against Eintracht Braunschweig. He finished the 2014–15 season making only the one appearance in the 2. Bundesliga and a goal in 20 appearances in the Regionalliga Nordost.

=== SV Babelsberg 03 ===
He then moved to Regionalliga Nordost club SV Babelsberg 03. He made his debut for the club when he came on as a substitute on matchday one against Wacker Nordhausen. He finished the 2016–17 season with two goals in 23 matches played. Koch dislocated his shoulder in a mid-season friendly match during the 2017–18 season. He was declared out for the remainder of the season. He had played in 14 matches up until the injury.

== Career statistics ==
As of matches played on 15 May 2018.

Club	Season	League			Ref.
Club	Season	Division	Apps	Goals	Ref.
Union Berlin II	2013–14	Regionalliga Nordost	1	0	
Union Berlin II	2014–15	Regionalliga Nordost	20	1	
Union Berlin II	Totals		21	1	—
Union Berlin	2014–15	2. Bundesliga	1	0	
SV Babelsberg 03	2016–17	Regionalliga Nordost	23	2	
SV Babelsberg 03	2017–18	Regionalliga Nordost	14	0	
SV Babelsberg 03	Totals		37	2	—
Career totals			59	3	—
