= Kilian Pruschke =

German footballer

Personal information
- Full name: Kilian Pruschke
- Date of birth: 8 September 1992 (age 34)
- Place of birth: Berlin, Germany
- Height: 1.81 m (5 ft 11 in)
- Position: Goalkeeper

Team information
- Current team: CFC Hertha 06
- Number: 28

Youth career
- 1999–2003: Lichtenrader BC 25
- 2003–2010: Union Berlin

Senior career*
Years	Team	Apps	(Gls)
2010–2013	Union Berlin II	42	(0)
2011–2013	Union Berlin	1	(0)
2013–2015	Tennis Borussia Berlin	34	(0)
2015–2019	SV Blau Weiss Berlin	83	(0)
2019–2020	SG Großziethen	18	(0)
2020–	CFC Hertha 06	12	(0)
- * Club domestic league appearances and goals as of 30 January 2021

Kilian Pruschke (born 8 September 1992) is a German professional footballer who plays as a goalkeeper for CFC Hertha 06.

== Career ==
Pruschke was born in Berlin. In November 2013, he joined Tennis Borussia Berlin after his contract with 1. FC Union Berlin had expired at the end of June 2013.
