= Christopher Quiring =

German footballer (born 1990)

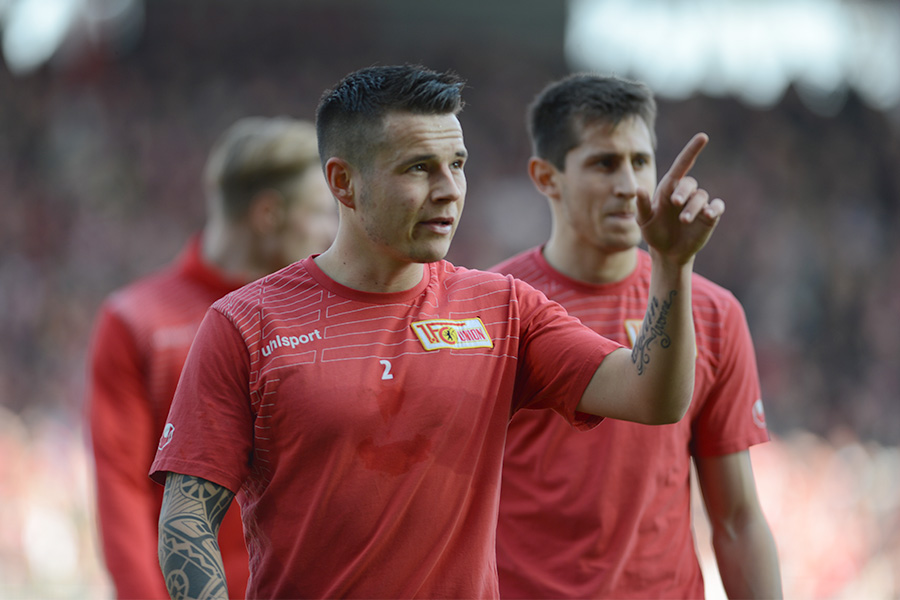
- Quiring in 2015

Personal information
- Full name: Christopher Quiring
- Date of birth: 23 November 1990 (age 35)
- Place of birth: Berlin, Germany
- Height: 1.72 m (5 ft 8 in)
- Position: Right winger

Team information
- Current team: VSG Altglienicke
- Number: 22

Youth career
- 1995–2002: BSC Marzahn
- 2002–2010: Union Berlin

Senior career*
| Years | Team | Apps | (Gls) |
| 2010–2017 | Union Berlin | 130 | (19) |
| 2013–2014 | Union Berlin II | 9 | (2) |
| 2017–2018 | Hansa Rostock | 25 | (4) |
| 2018–2021 | VSG Altglienicke | 43 | (6) |
- * Club domestic league appearances and goals as of 18:50, 15 June 2025 (UTC)

Christopher Quiring (born 23 November 1990) is a retired German footballer who last played for VSG Altglienicke.

== Career ==
Quiring joined Union Berlin as a youth in 2002 and made his first-team and professional debut in 2010. In total, he played 130 matches in the 2. Bundesliga and 5 in the DFB-Pokal for the club, scoring 19 goals.

In January 201, he left Union Berlin to join Hansa Rostock having only made three substitute appearances in the first half of the 2016–17 season.

== Career statistics ==
As of match played 1 June 2018

Appearances and goals by club, season and competition
| Club | Season | League | | | DFB-Pokal | | Total | |
| Club | Season | Division | Apps | Goals | Apps | Goals | Apps | Goals |
|---|---|---|---|---|---|---|---|---|
| Union Berlin | 2010–11 | 2. Bundesliga | 11 | 1 | 1 | 0 | 12 | 1 |
| Union Berlin | 2011–12 | 2. Bundesliga | 23 | 6 | 1 | 0 | 24 | 6 |
| Union Berlin | 2012–13 | 2. Bundesliga | 26 | 4 | 1 | 0 | 27 | 4 |
| Union Berlin | 2013–14 | 2. Bundesliga | 21 | 3 | 1 | 0 | 22 | 3 |
| Union Berlin | 2014–15 | 2. Bundesliga | 29 | 4 | 0 | 0 | 29 | 4 |
| Union Berlin | 2015–16 | 2. Bundesliga | 17 | 1 | 0 | 0 | 17 | 1 |
| Union Berlin | 2016–17 | 2. Bundesliga | 3 | 0 | 1 | 0 | 4 | 0 |
| Union Berlin | Total | | 130 | 19 | 5 | 0 | 135 | 19 |
| Union Berlin II | 2012–13 | Regionalliga Nordost | 3 | 0 | – | | 3 | 0 |
| Union Berlin II | 2013–14 | Regionalliga Nordost | 5 | 2 | – | | 5 | 2 |
| Union Berlin II | 2014–15 | Regionalliga Nordost | 1 | 0 | – | | 1 | 0 |
| Union Berlin II | Total | | 9 | 2 | – | | 9 | 2 |
| Hansa Rostock | 2016–17 | 3. Liga | 16 | 4 | 0 | 0 | 16 | 4 |
| Hansa Rostock | 2017–18 | 3. Liga | 9 | 0 | 0 | 0 | 9 | 0 |
| Hansa Rostock | Total | | 25 | 4 | 0 | 0 | 25 | 4 |
| Career total | | | 164 | 25 | 5 | 0 | 169 | 25 |
