= Maurice Trapp =

German footballer

Personal information
- Date of birth: 31 December 1991 (age 34)
- Place of birth: Berlin, Germany
- Height: 1.91 m (6 ft 3 in)
- Position: Centre-back

Team information
- Current team: VSG Altglienicke
- Number: 18

Youth career
- –2010: Union Berlin

Senior career*
| Years | Team | Apps | (Gls) |
| 2010–2014 | Union Berlin II | 76 | (6) |
| 2010–2014 | Union Berlin | 10 | (0) |
| 2013 | → Hansa Rostock (loan) | 14 | (0) |
| 2014–2015 | Goslarer SC | 27 | (0) |
| 2015–2017 | Berliner AK 07 | 65 | (2) |
| 2017–2018 | Chemnitzer FC | 25 | (1) |
| 2018–2022 | VfL Osnabrück | 113 | (6) |
| 2022–2024 | Mainz 05 II | 55 | (1) |
| 2024– | VSG Altglienicke | 12 | (0) |
- * Club domestic league appearances and goals as of 1 January 2025

Maurice Trapp (born 31 December 1991) is a German professional footballer who plays as a centre-back for VSG Altglienicke.
