= Patrick Zoundi =

Burkinabe footballer (born 1982)

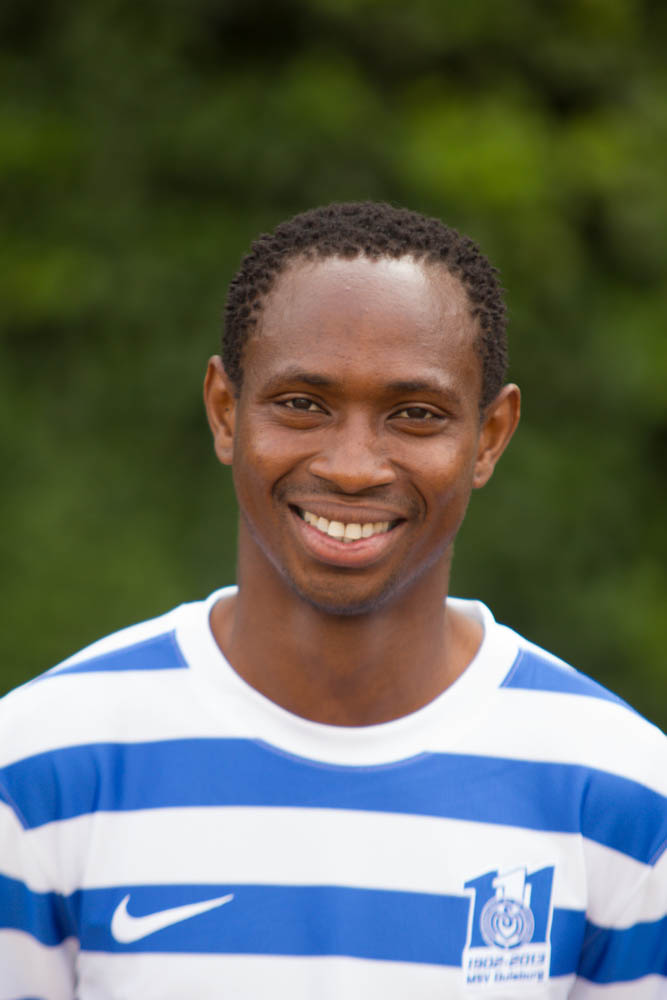
- Zoundi with MSV Duisburg in 2013

Personal information
- Date of birth: 19 July 1982 (age 44)
- Place of birth: Ouagadougou, Upper Volta
- Height: 1.73 m (5 ft 8 in)
- Positions: Forward; midfielder

Youth career
- Planète Champion

Senior career*
Years	Team	Apps	(Gls)
1998–2000	Planète Champion	39	(20)
2000–2005	Lokeren	76	(7)
2005–2006	Ethnikos Asteras	28	(4)
2006–2008	Asteras Tripolis	41	(7)
2008–2009	Panserraikos	18	(2)
2009–2011	Fortuna Düsseldorf	42	(2)
2011–2013	Union Berlin	15	(2)
2013–2014	MSV Duisburg	33	(5)
2014–2016	1. FC Saarbrücken	18	(1)
Total		310	(50)

International career
1998–2010	Burkina Faso	18	(1)
- * Club domestic league appearances and goals

Patrick Zoundi (born 19 July 1982) is a Burkinabé former professional footballer who played as a forward or midfielder.

== Club career ==
Zoundi began his career in the youth academy of Planète Champion. In the summer of 2000, he moved to Europe, joining the Belgian club KSC Lokeren. After five years in Belgium, he signed a contract with Ethnikos Asteras in Greece. After only one season with Ethnikos he signed for Asteras Tripolis, playing two seasons while playing 41 league matches and scoring seven goals.

In July 2008, he signed with Panserraikos in the Super League Greece, before he signed a two-year contract with Fortuna Düsseldorf following a successful trial. He played as striker for Düsseldorf, but could also play in the right midfield or as a right winger.

He then played for Union Berlin before he moved to MSV Duisburg in 2013. He joined 1. FC Saarbrücken a year later.

== International career ==
Zoundi was a member of the Burkina Faso national team's squad at the 2004 African Nations Cup, which finished bottom of its group in the first round of competition, thus failing to secure qualification for the quarterfinals. He has played twelve caps for his country. and represented Burkina Faso at the 1999 FIFA U-17 World Championship in New Zealand.
