= Markus Karl =

German footballer

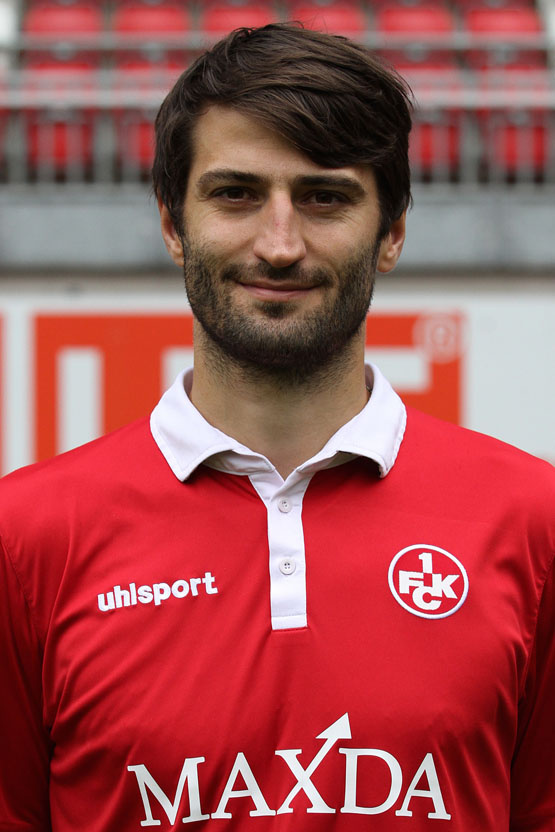
- Karl with Kaiserslautern in 2015

Personal information
- Date of birth: 14 February 1986 (age 40)
- Place of birth: Vilsbiburg, West Germany
- Height: 1.93 m (6 ft 4 in)
- Position: Midfielder

Team information
- Current team: SV Alsenborn (player-assistant)

Youth career
- 1991–2003: TSV Vilsbiburg
- 2003–2004: Greuther Fürth

Senior career*
Years	Team	Apps	(Gls)
2004–2005	Greuther Fürth	1	(0)
2005–2006	Hamburger SV	5	(0)
2005–2007	Hamburger SV II	22	(1)
2007	Greuther Fürth	5	(0)
2008–2011	FC Ingolstadt 04	96	(8)
2011–2012	Union Berlin	49	(4)
2013–2016	1. FC Kaiserslautern	98	(7)
2016–2020	SV Sandhausen	77	(3)
2021–	SV Alsenborn		

International career
2004	Germany U19	1	(0)
2005	Germany U20	1	(0)

Managerial career
- 2021–: SV Alsenborn (player-assistant)
- * Club domestic league appearances and goals as of 09:37, 27 November 2020 (UTC)

Markus Karl (born 14 February 1986) is a German professional footballer who plays as a midfielder for SV Alsenborn.

== International career ==
Karl is a youth international for Germany.
