= Daniel Göhlert =

German footballer

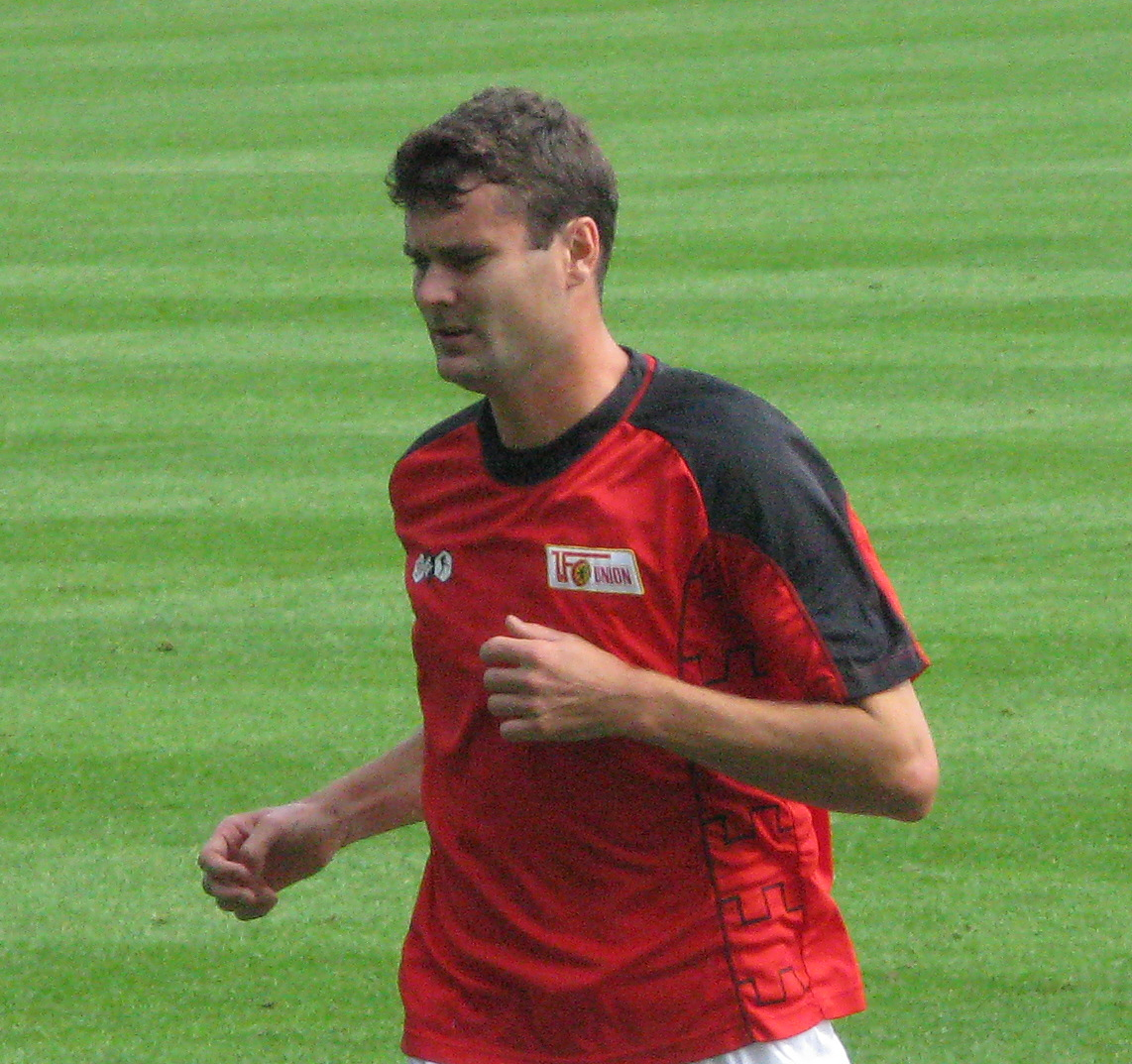
- Daniel Göhlert in 2009

Personal information
- Date of birth: 25 September 1980 (age 46)
- Place of birth: Karl-Marx-Stadt, East Germany
- Height: 1.88 m (6 ft 2 in)
- Position: Defender

Youth career
- 1987–2000: Chemnitzer FC

Senior career*
Years	Team	Apps	(Gls)
2000–2006	Chemnitzer FC	175	(5)
2006–2013	Union Berlin	163	(2)
Total		338	(7)
- * Club domestic league appearances and goals

Daniel Göhlert (born 25 September 1980) is a German former professional footballer who played as a defender.
