= Steven Skrzybski =

German footballer

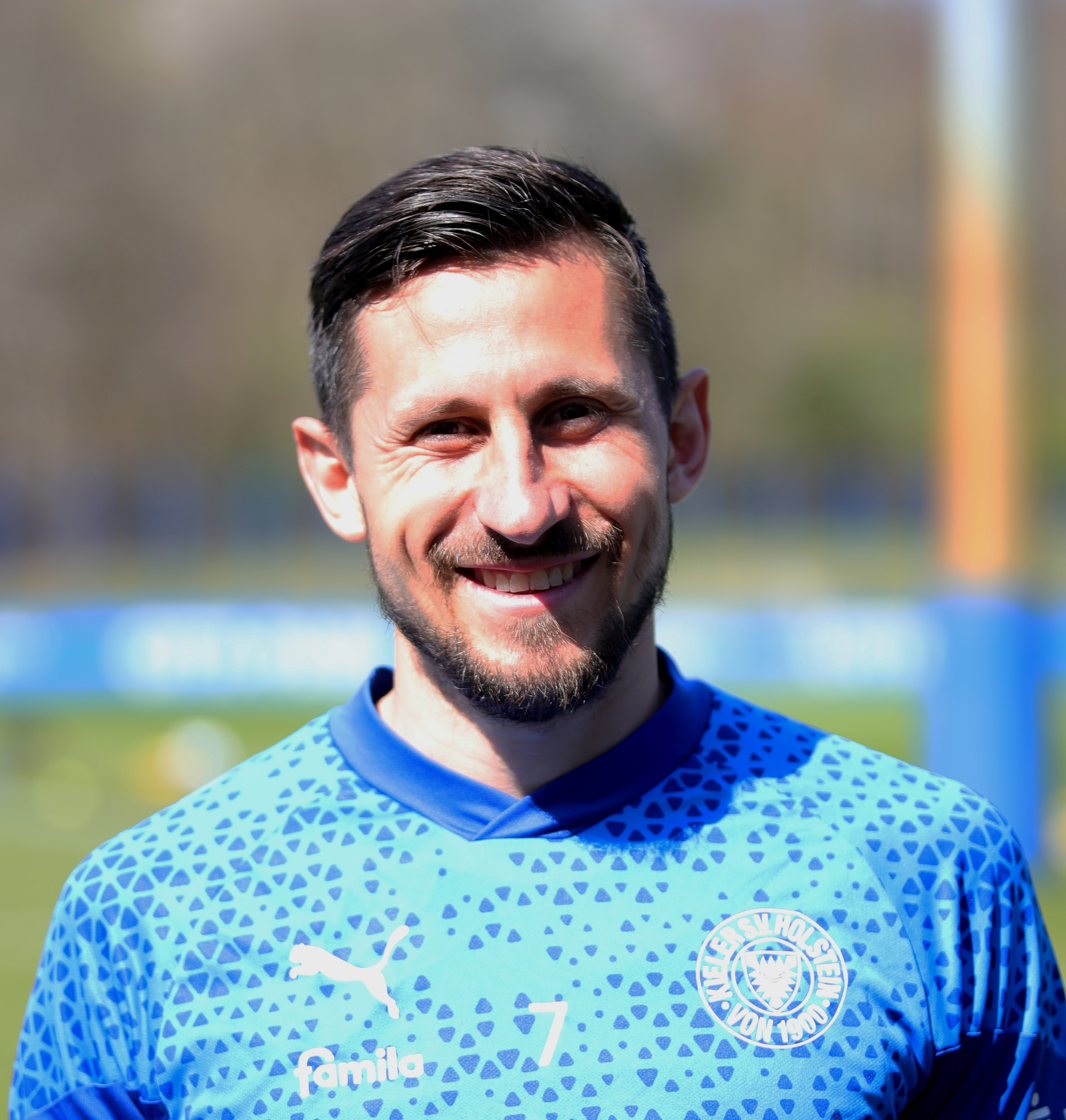
- Skrzybski with Holstein Kiel in 2025

Personal information
- Date of birth: 18 November 1992 (age 33)
- Place of birth: Berlin, Germany
- Height: 1.73 m (5 ft 8 in)
- Position: Striker

Team information
- Current team: Holstein Kiel
- Number: 7

Youth career
- 1998–2000: SG Stern Kaulsdorf
- 2001–2010: Union Berlin

Senior career*
Years	Team	Apps	(Gls)
2010–2016	Union Berlin II	31	(17)
2010–2018	Union Berlin	136	(29)
2018–2021	Schalke 04	25	(3)
2019	Schalke 04 II	4	(2)
2020	→ Fortuna Düsseldorf (loan)	11	(1)
2021–	Holstein Kiel	128	(37)
- * Club domestic league appearances and goals as of 18 May 2026

Steven Skrzybski (born 18 November 1992) is a German professional footballer who plays as a striker for 2. Bundesliga club Holstein Kiel.

== Career ==
=== Early years ===
Born in the capital Berlin, Skrzybski began playing at youth level from a very young age. He started at just eight years old with local team SG Stern Kaulsdorf before quickly being spotted as a potential star by professional club Union Berlin.

=== Union Berlin ===
Skrzybski played 143 official games for Union from 2010 to 2018. Having risen through the various youth ranks at the club, he broke into the reserve team and was also considered to be first team quality. After mostly playing with the reserves for a few years the striker began life at full professional level and made a name for himself in the 2016–17 season, when he played in 32 matches and scored 9 times. He scored 14 goals in the 2017–18 season.

=== Schalke 04 ===
On 29 May 2018, Schalke announced that Skrzybski signed for the club on a three-year deal. On 24 November 2018, he scored his first two goals for Schalke against 1. FC Nürnberg in a 5–2 victory.

On 3 January 2020, Skrzybski was loaned out to Fortuna Düsseldorf for the rest of the 2019–20 season.

=== Holstein Kiel ===
On 5 July 2021, Skrzybski signed for Holstein Kiel.

== Personal life ==
Skrzybski is of distant Polish descent.

== Career statistics ==
As of match played 20 December 2025

Appearances and goals by club, season and competition
Club	Season	League			DFB-Pokal		Europe		Total	
Club	Season	League	Apps	Goals	Apps	Goals	Apps	Goals	Apps	Goals
Union Berlin	2010–11	2. Bundesliga	4	0	0	0	–		4	0
Union Berlin	2011–12	2. Bundesliga	7	0	0	0	–		7	0
Union Berlin	2012–13	2. Bundesliga	11	1	0	0	–		11	1
Union Berlin	2013–14	2. Bundesliga	11	1	1	0	–		12	1
Union Berlin	2014–15	2. Bundesliga	23	2	1	0	–		24	2
Union Berlin	2015–16	2. Bundesliga	21	3	1	0	–		22	3
Union Berlin	2016–17	2. Bundesliga	30	8	2	1	–		32	9
Union Berlin	2017–18	2. Bundesliga	29	14	2	0	–		31	14
Union Berlin	Total		136	29	7	1	–		143	30
Schalke 04	2018–19	Bundesliga	12	3	0	0	4 (Note: Appearances in UEFA Champions League)	0	16	3
Schalke 04	2019–20	Bundesliga	0	0	1	1	–		1	1
Schalke 04	2020–21	Bundesliga	13	0	2	0	–		15	0
Schalke 04	Total		25	3	3	1	4	0	32	4
Fortuna Düsseldorf (loan)	2019–20	Bundesliga	11	1	1	0	–		12	1
Holstein Kiel	2021–22	2. Bundesliga	24	4	2	0	–		26	4
Holstein Kiel	2022–23	2. Bundesliga	34	15	0	0	–		34	15
Holstein Kiel	2023–24	2. Bundesliga	26	10	2	0	–		28	10
Holstein Kiel	2024–25	Bundesliga	24	6	1	0	–		25	6
Holstein Kiel	2025–26	2. Bundesliga	12	1	1	0	–		13	1
Holstein Kiel	Total		120	36	6	0	–		126	36
Career total			291	69	17	2	4	0	313	71
