= Sílvio (footballer, born 1985) =

Brazilian footballer

Silvio
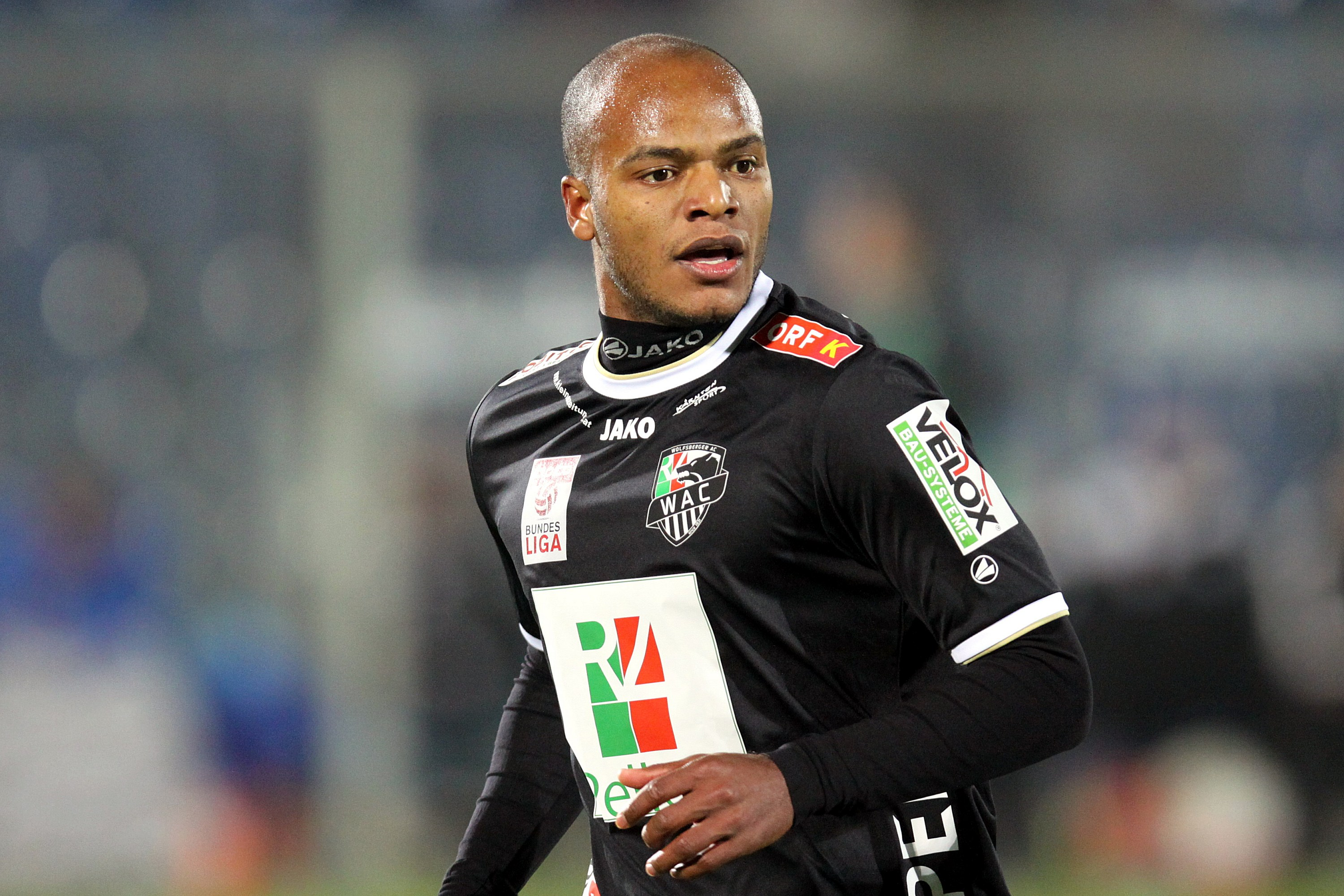
- Silvio in 2014

Personal information
- Full name: Silvio Carlos de Oliveira
- Date of birth: 1 February 1985 (age 41)
- Place of birth: Mandaguari, Brazil
- Height: 1.83 m (6 ft 0 in)
- Position: Forward

Team information
- Current team: Brühl
- Number: 9

Senior career*
Years	Team	Apps	(Gls)
2005	Santos		(1)
2006–2008	FC Wil	46	(15)
2008–2010	FC Zürich	13	(0)
2008–2009	→ FC Wil (loan)	20	(10)
2009–2010	→ Lugano (loan)	28	(15)
2010–2011	→ Lausanne-Sport (loan)	27	(15)
2011–2013	Union Berlin	47	(9)
2014–2016	Wolfsberger AC	76	(12)
2016–2018	FC Winterthur	65	(26)
2018–2023	FC Wil	139	(24)
2023–	Brühl	11	(0)
- * Club domestic league appearances and goals as of 26 October 2023

Silvio Carlos de Oliveira (born 1 February 1985), commonly known as Silvio, is a Brazilian professional footballer who plays as a forward for Swiss Promotion League side Brühl.

== Career ==
Silvio was born in Mandaguari, Paraná.

He joined Swiss club FC Wil in February 2006, from Santos. He was signed by FC Zürich from FC Wil in February 2008. Silvio signed for 2. Bundesliga side Union Berlin on 6 July 2011, on a three-year deal.

On 27 January 2014, he moved to the Austrian Bundesliga side Wolfsberger AC, signing a 1 1/2-year deal.
