= Christian Stuff =

German footballer (born 1982)

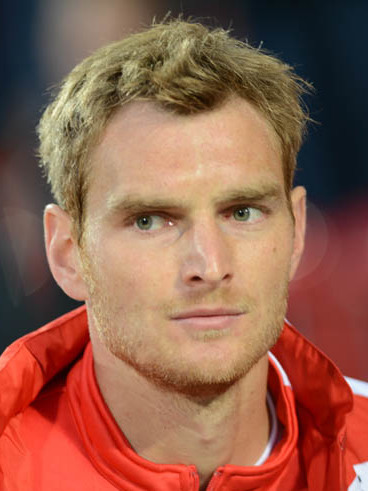
- Stuff playing for Union Berlin in 2013.

Personal information
- Date of birth: 11 August 1982 (age 44)
- Place of birth: East Berlin, East Germany
- Height: 1.99 m (6 ft 6 in)
- Position: Defender

Youth career
- SV Empor Berlin
- Borussia 1920 Friedrichsfelde
- SV Lichtenberg

Senior career*
Years	Team	Apps	(Gls)
2002–2003	SV Lichtenberg		
2003–2005	1. FC Saarbrücken	52	(2)
2005–2006	→ Eintracht Trier (loan)	15	(0)
2006–2014	Union Berlin	214	(14)
2014–2015	Hansa Rostock	15	(0)
- * Club domestic league appearances and goals as of 21 December 2014

Christian Stuff (born 11 August 1982) is a German former footballer who played as a defender.
