= Chinedu Ede =

German footballer (born 1987)

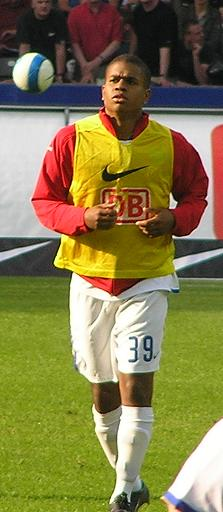
- Ede training with Hertha BSC in 2007

Personal information
- Date of birth: 5 February 1987 (age 39)
- Place of birth: Berlin-Wilmersdorf, West Germany
- Height: 1.78 m (5 ft 10 in)
- Position: Winger

Youth career
- 1993–1998: Berliner AK
- 1998: Reinickendorfer Füchse
- 1998–2005: Hertha BSC

Senior career*
Years	Team	Apps	(Gls)
2005–2007	Hertha BSC II	55	(13)
2006–2008	Hertha BSC	19	(1)
2008–2009	MSV Duisburg	24	(1)
2010–2012	Union Berlin	80	(11)
2012–2015	Mainz 05	9	(1)
2014	→ 1. FC Kaiserslautern (loan)	5	(0)
2014–2015	→ Anorthosis Famagusta (loan)	22	(3)
2015–2017	Twente	48	(6)
2017	Bangkok United	7	(1)
2018–2019	VSG Altglienicke	33	(7)
Total		302	(43)

International career
2003–2004	Germany U17	10	(0)
2004–2005	Germany U18	4	(2)
2005–2006	Germany U19	10	(5)
2006–2007	Germany U20	3	(0)
2007–2008	Germany U21	4	(0)
Medal record
Men's football
Representing Germany
UEFA European Under-21 Championship
Winner	2009 Sweden
- * Club domestic league appearances and goals

Chinedu Ede (born 5 February 1987) is a German former professional footballer who played as a winger.

== Career ==
Ede began his career with Berlin AK 07 and joined later the Reinickendorfer Füchse. In 1998 was scouted by Hertha BSC. He initially played for the youth team, scoring 21 goals in 39 games for the U19, before being promoted to the senior squad on 6 April 2006. He played then two years for the senior side of Hertha BSC. On 21 May 2008, Ede signed a four-year contract until 30 June 2011 with MSV Duisburg. After playing ten matches and scoring two goals in two-and-a-half years, he left Duisburg and returned to Berlin to sign for Union Berlin.

On 23 July 2012, he signed a four-year contract with 1. FSV Mainz 05 until 30 June 2016. On 16 August 2014, he signed a one-year loan contract with Anorthosis Famagusta. Mainz also granted Anorthosis a subsequent purchase option.

On 27 August 2015, Edu moved to Eredivisie club Twente, where he signed a two-year contract until 30 June 2017. After his contract with Twente expired and an extension option was not triggered by the club, he joined Bangkok United in Thailand in June 2017.

In late 2017, Edu returned to Germany and signed a contract with the Regionalliga Nordost club VSG Altglienicke. There, he eventually retired from football in the summer of 2019.

== Personal life ==
Chinedu has a Nigerian father which made him eligible to play for Nigeria.

== Honours ==
Germany U21

- UEFA Under-21 Championship: 2009
