= Björn Jopek =

German footballer (born 1993)

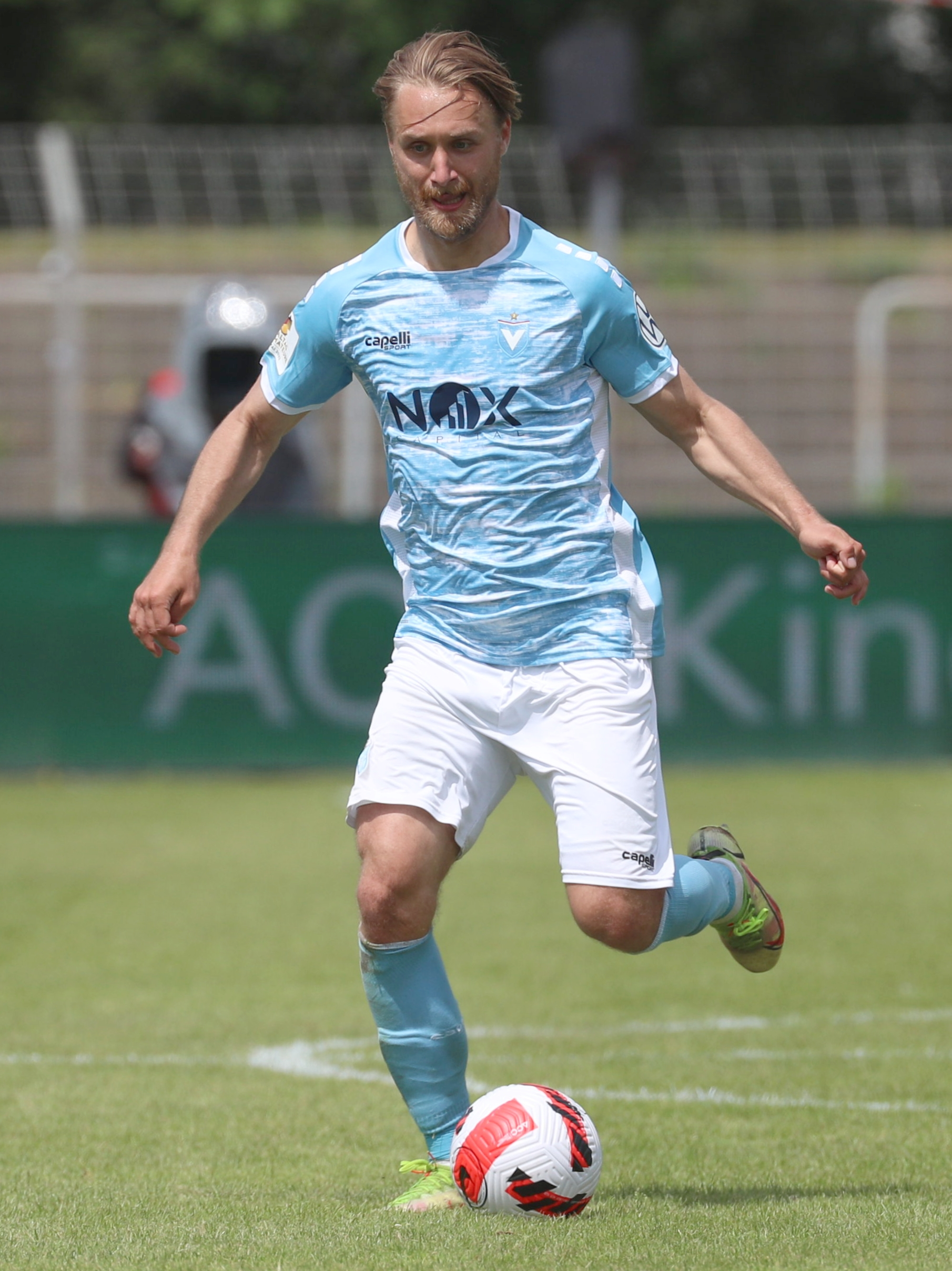
- Jopek in 2022

Personal information
- Date of birth: 24 August 1993 (age 33)
- Place of birth: Berlin, Germany
- Height: 1.80 m (5 ft 11 in)
- Position: Midfielder

Team information
- Current team: Eintracht Mahlsdorf

Youth career
- –2011: Union Berlin

Senior career*
Years	Team	Apps	(Gls)
2011–2014	Union Berlin II	14	(1)
2012–2015	Union Berlin	55	(5)
2015–2016	Arminia Bielefeld	4	(0)
2016–2017	Chemnitzer FC	29	(1)
2017–2018	Würzburger Kickers	9	(1)
2018–2020	Hallescher FC	54	(5)
2021–2022	Viktoria Berlin	33	(3)
2022–2024	Kickers Offenbach	49	(7)
2024–	Eintracht Mahlsdorf	0	(0)
- * Club domestic league appearances and goals as of 18 May 2024

Björn Jopek (born 24 August 1993) is a German professional footballer who plays as a midfielder for Eintracht Mahlsdorf. His father Bernd was also a footballer.

== Career ==
In June 2018, Jopek left 3. Liga side Würzburger Kickers to join league rivals Hallescher FC.

On 1 February 2021, after training with Viktoria Berlin since August 2020, Jopek joined the Regionalliga Nordost club on a contract until summer 2022.
