= Tijani Belaïd =

French-born Tunisian footballer (born 1987)

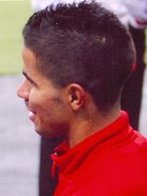

Personal information
- Date of birth: 6 September 1987 (age 39)
- Place of birth: Paris, France
- Height: 1.80 m (5 ft 11 in)
- Position: Attacking midfielder

Youth career
- 2003–2004: Paris
- 2004–2005: Inter Milan

Senior career*
Years	Team	Apps	(Gls)
2005–2008	Inter Milan	5	(0)
2007	→ PSV Eindhoven (loan)	0	(0)
2007–2008	→ Slavia Prague (loan)	15	(4)
2008–2011	Slavia Prague	49	(11)
2011	Hull City	18	(0)
2011–2012	APOEL	14	(1)
2013	Union Berlin	20	(0)
2013–2014	Lokomotiv Plovdiv	18	(1)
2014–2016	Club Africain	55	(9)
2017	Veria	11	(0)
2017	Sriwijaya	26	(5)
2018	Club Africain	10	(2)
2018	Borneo	13	(1)
2019	Al-Muharraq		
2019–2020	Erbil SC		
2021	Alay Osh	9	(1)
2022	AS Rejiche		
2022	Vysočina Jihlava	11	(2)
2023	AS Marsa		
2023–2024	Cholet	1	(0)
2024–2025	Créteil	20	(0)

International career
2007–2015	Tunisia	20	(3)
- * Club domestic league appearances and goals as of 17 May 2025

Tijani Belaïd (Arabic: تيجاني بلعيد; born 6 September 1987) is a professional footballer who plays as an attacking midfielder. Born in France, he played for the Tunisia national team at international level.

== Club career ==
Born in Paris, France, Belaïd started his career at Paris FC, close to his birthplace.

=== Inter Milan ===
In 2004, Belaïd signed for Inter Milan Primavera side. The first Serie A appearance of Belaïd was in the last match of 2004–05 season, against Reggina Calcio.

In January 2007, Belaïd was loaned to PSV Eindhoven, but did not feature for the first team.

=== Slavia Prague ===
In the summer of 2007, Belaïd was sent on loan to Slavia Prague. With the Czech team he scored his first goal in the UEFA Champions League on 19 September 2007. However, in October he was demoted to train with the club's 'B' team after disciplinary problems. Coach Karel Jarolím stated: "I think he needs to think above all about his behaviour off the pitch, I don't like his attitude when he doesn't play or when he comes on as a substitute". A month later, Belaïd was taken back to the main squad.

In January 2008, while preparing for the 2008 African Cup of Nations with the Tunisian national team, he was involved in a car crash, which resulted in the deaths of three people. He was kept in custody for several days, but was later cleared of any charges by the court. Belaïd finished the 2007–08 season with 15 league appearances for Slavia, in which he scored four goals.

In July 2008, Slavia Prague used an option to buy him from Internazionale for undisclosed fee. Belaïd signed a three-year contract. In February 2010, he was trialed at Mladá Boleslav to finalize a possible loan, however the trial was unsuccessful, and he returned to Slavia Prague.

In 2011, Belaïd was released by Slavia Prague, having made 49 league appearances and scored 11 goals during his permanent spell at the club.

=== Hull City ===
On 17 January 2011, Belaïd started a trial with English Championship club Hull City and was strongly linked also with their Championship rivals Cardiff City. On 20 January 2010, it was confirmed that, subject to international clearance, Hull City had won the race to signing him, with him penning a deal until the end of the season, with an option of two more years, should the club want him to stay. The deal was confirmed a week later on 27 January, with the news that he would be available for the squad to play Queens Park Rangers on 29 January. Belaïd made his debut on 1 February 2011 coming off the bench as a replacement for Aaron McLean in the 2–2 draw against Leeds United at the KC Stadium.

On 10 May 2011, following the end of the 2010–11 season, it was confirmed by the club that Belaïd had been released from Hull City along with three other players, after making only eight appearances for the East Riding of Yorkshire club.

=== APOEL ===
On 31 August 2011, Belaïd signed a two-year contract with Cypriot champions and UEFA Champions League contenders APOEL. He made his official debut on 15 October in a League game against AEL Limassol, coming on as a substitute early into the second half. On 19 November 2011, he scored his first goal for APOEL in a Cypriot First Division match against Ermis Aradippou, by scoring APOEL's second goal in a 2–0 home win. He made his debut in the UEFA Champions League group stages with APOEL on 6 December 2011, after coming on as a substitute on 60th minute, in his side's 2–0 home loss from Shakhtar Donetsk for the final matchday of Group G. In January 2012, Belaid's contract was terminated by APOEL, leaving the club after four months.

=== Union Berlin ===
At the end of the January 2012 transfer window, Belaïd signed a six-month contract with German side Union Berlin. He remained with the German side until December when he was released. In January 2013, he signed for Moreirense F.C.

=== Club Africain ===
On 7 July 2014, Belaïd joined Tunisian side Club Africain, signing a two-year contract.

=== CS Sfaxien ===
After losing Moncer, Maâloul and Ajayi this summer, CS Sfaxien begins to fill up. In this context, the club carried out a fine contract by signing Tijani Belaïd. The 28-year-old midfielder was free since leaving Club Africain, where he refused to renew his contract. After having passed his medical successfully, the Tunisian international is committed for a remarkable season. On 2 January 2017, he mutually solved his contract with the club.

=== Veria ===
On 17 January 2017, Veria officially announced the signing of Tijani Belaïd until the end of 2016–17 season for an undisclosed fee.

=== Sriwijaya ===
On 26 April 2017, Belaïd joined Sriwijaya on a one-year contract.

=== Alay Osh ===
In March 2021, Belaïd signed for Kyrgyz Premier League club Alay Osh.

== International career ==
Belaïd was called up for the Tunisian under-17 team. In September 2005 he received his first and only call-up to France under-19 for a training camp. He received a call from the Tunisia national team, making his debut in 2006.

== Personal life ==
His brother Aymen is also a footballer.

== Honours ==
- Coppa Italia Primavera: 2006
- Czech First League: 2007–08, 2008–09
