= Patrick Kohlmann =

Irish footballer (born 1983)

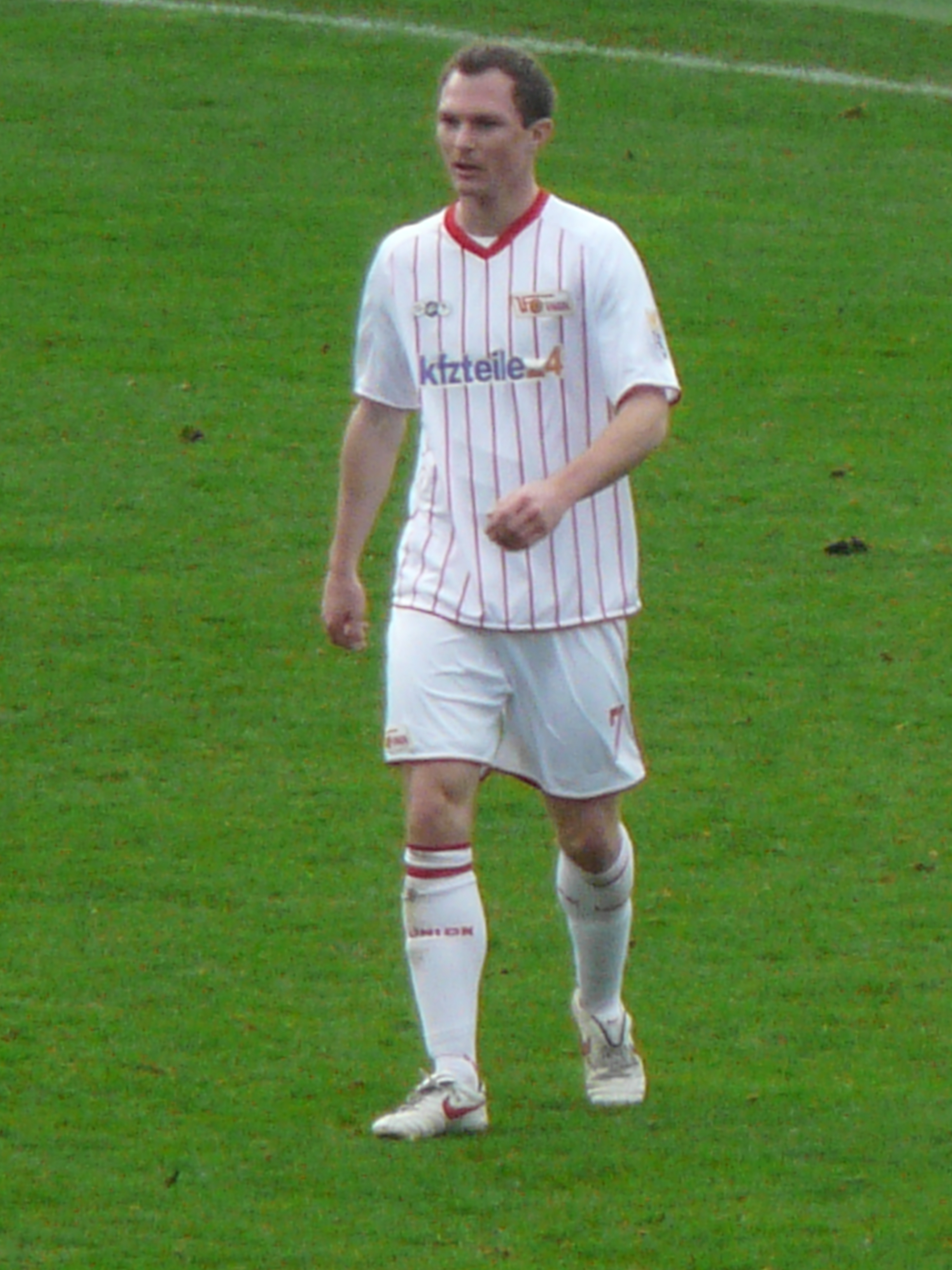
- Kohlmann playing for Union Berlin in 2009

Personal information
- Date of birth: 25 February 1983 (age 43)
- Place of birth: Dortmund, West Germany
- Height: 1.82 m (6 ft 0 in)
- Position: Defender

Youth career
- 1990–1992: BV Westfalia Wickede
- 1992–1993: TSC Eintracht Dortmund
- 1993–2002: Borussia Dortmund

Senior career*
Years	Team	Apps	(Gls)
2002–2007	Borussia Dortmund II	108	(3)
2004–2005	Borussia Dortmund	1	(0)
2007–2008	Rot-Weiß Erfurt	25	(1)
2008–2014	Union Berlin	168	(3)
2014–2017	Holstein Kiel	74	(0)
Total		376	(7)

International career
2003–2004	Republic of Ireland U21	5	(0)
- * Club domestic league appearances and goals

Patrick Kohlmann (born 25 February 1983) is a professional football coach and former player who was most recently the assistant coach of Bundesliga club RB Leipzig. A Borussia Dortmund youth exponent, he played as a defender for Holstein Kiel, Union Berlin, Rot-Weiß Erfurt, and Borussia Dortmund II. Born in West Germany, he represented the Republic of Ireland at youth level.

== Club career ==
Born in Dortmund to a German father and Irish mother, Kohlmann began his football career with BV Westfalia Wickede, before moving on to TSC Eintracht Dortmund. In 1993, he impressed Bundesliga club Borussia Dortmund and signed for their youth team.

Kohlmann stayed at Borussia Dortmund for 14 years, where he elevated from youth player to playing for the reserves. His chances with the first team were limited, often as an unused sub. He finally got his chance in 2004 versus 1. FC Kaiserslautern but went off with a bad knee injury. It was to be his only season as a first team squad member. For the reserve team, he made 101 Regionalliga appearances with 2 goals.

In 2007, Kohlmann signed for Regionalliga Nord side Rot-Weiß Erfurt and helped in their push for promotion to the 3. Liga.

The next season, he joined fellow 3. Liga side 1. FC Union Berlin. Until his departure in 2014, he amassed 142 2. Bundesliga appearances scoring 2 goals.

Kohlmann signed for Holstein Kiel in July 2014. After 74 3. Liga caps for Holstein Kiel, he retired at the end of the 2016–17 season and became assistant coach at the club.

== International career ==
Kohlmann represented the Republic of Ireland U21 national team five times. He made his debut on 19 August 2003, against Poland. He was also in the squad of Irish U-20 in 2000. Kohlmann was eligible to represent Ireland because of his Irish mother.
