= Torsten Mattuschka =

German footballer

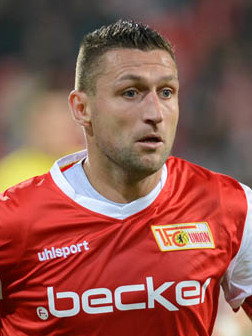
- Mattuschka playing for Union Berlin in 2013

Personal information
- Date of birth: 4 October 1980 (age 46)
- Place of birth: Cottbus, East Germany
- Height: 1.86 m (6 ft 1 in)
- Position: Midfielder

Team information
- Current team: VSG Altglienicke (assistant manager)

Youth career
- 1996–1997: Rot-Weiß Merzdorf
- 1997–2001: SV Dissenchen 04

Senior career*
Years	Team	Apps	(Gls)
2002–2005	Energie Cottbus II	23	(11)
2002–2005	Energie Cottbus	14	(0)
2005–2014	Union Berlin	246	(52)
2014–2016	Energie Cottbus	37	(3)
2016–2018	VSG Altglienicke	43	(12)
Total		363	(78)

Managerial career
- 2018–: VSG Altglienicke (assistant)
- * Club domestic league appearances and goals

Torsten Mattuschka (born 4 October 1980) is a German former professional footballer who played as a midfielder. He works as the assistant manager of VSG Altglienicke.

== Biography ==
Mattuschka was born in Cottbus, Germany. He began his senior career with seventh-tier side Dissenchen, where his goal record led to a transfer to Energie Cottbus in 2002. At the age of 24, he moved from Energie Cottbus to 1. FC Union Berlin ahead of the 2005–06 season.

In August 2005, Mattuschka played in Union Berlin's 8–0 victory over BFC Dynamo, contributing to a two-goal lead before half-time. In 2010, Uwe Neuhaus appointed him team captain following an improvement in his goal output.

In February 2011, he scored a free kick in the 71st minute during a 2–1 away win against Hertha Berlin at the Olympiastadion, with the game tied 1–1 at the time.

During his time at Union Berlin, Mattuschka scored 61 goals and recorded 62 assists in 281 competitive matches, including 42 goals and 47 assists in 171 appearances in Germany's second tier.

After retiring from professional football, he appeared for Union Berlin's masters team, which won the club's first AOK Masters title in January 2018.
