= Uwe Neuhaus =

German footballer and manager

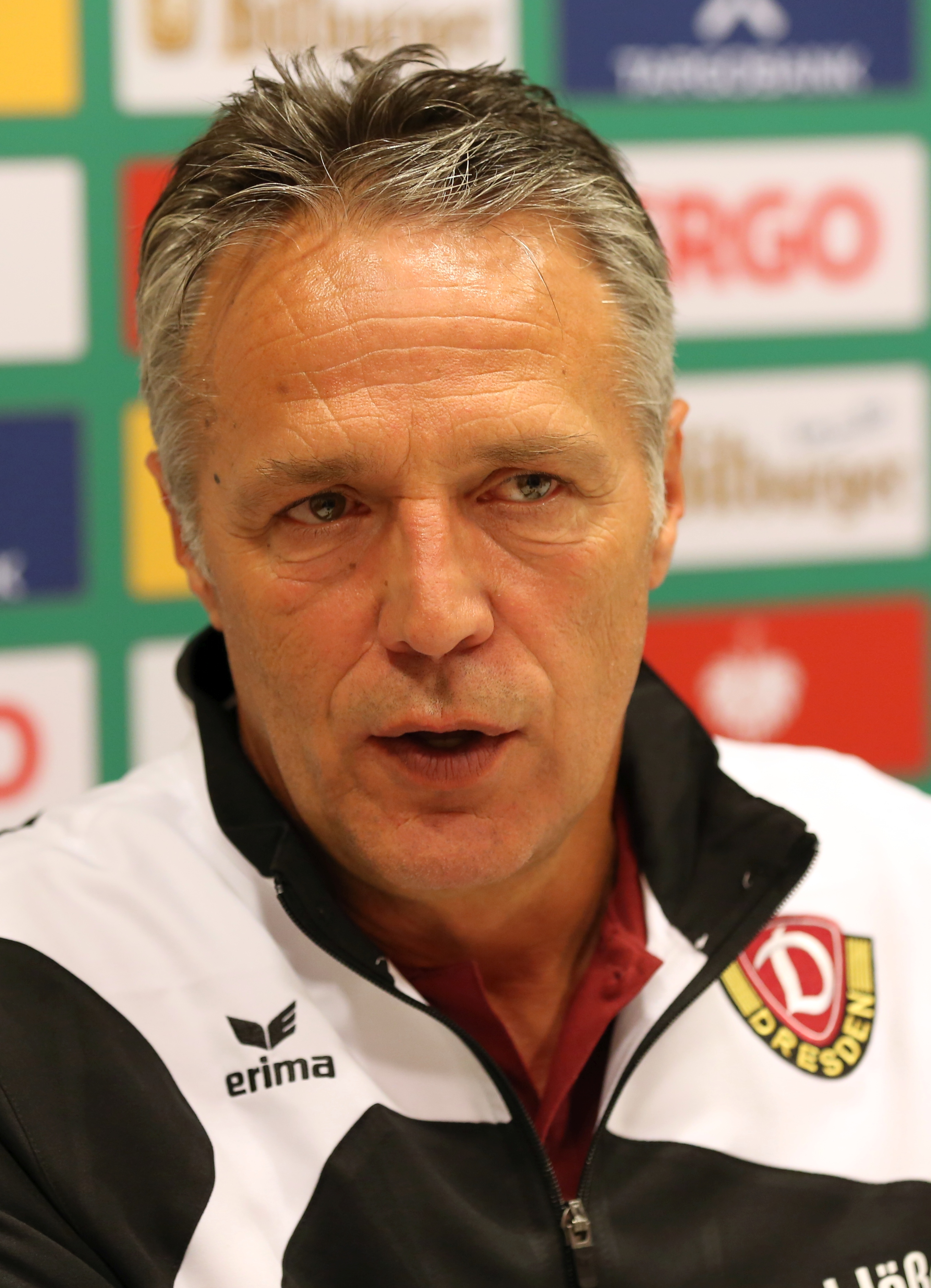
- Neuhaus in 2017

Personal information
- Date of birth: 26 November 1959 (age 66)
- Place of birth: Hattingen, West Germany
- Height: 1.90 m (6 ft 3 in)
- Position: Midfielder

Youth career
- TuS Hattingen
- VfL Winz-Baak

Senior career*
Years	Team	Apps	(Gls)
1982–1984	SpVgg Erkenschwick		
1984–1988	Rot-Weiss Essen	80	(17)
1988–1989	BV Lüttringhausen		
1989–1995	Wattenscheid 09	155	(14)

Managerial career
- 1995–1996: Wattenscheid 09 II
- 1997–1998: VfB Hüls
- 2004–2005: Borussia Dortmund II
- 2005–2006: Rot-Weiss Essen
- 2007–2014: Union Berlin
- 2015–2018: Dynamo Dresden
- 2018–2021: Arminia Bielefeld
- * Club domestic league appearances and goals

Uwe Neuhaus (born 26 November 1959) is a German retired football player and manager who last managed Arminia Bielefeld.

== Coaching career ==
=== 1995–2006: Early career ===
Neuhaus was head coach of Wattenscheid 09 II from November 1995 to June 1996 and VfB Hüls from October 1997 to June 1998. Neuhaus had a stint as assistant coach at Borussia Dortmund from July 1998 until he became head coach of Borussia Dortmund II in June 2004. He was there until he became head coach of Rot-Weiss Essen in April 2005. Rot-Weiss Essen sacked Neuhaus in November 2006.

=== 2007–2014: Union Berlin ===
Neuhaus was head coach of Union Berlin between 1 July 2007 and 30 June 2014.

=== 2015–2018: Dynamo Dresden ===
On 10 April 2015 he was named the new head coach of Dynamo Dresden. He was sacked on 22 August 2018.

=== 2018–2021: Arminia Bielefeld ===
On 10 December 2018, Neuhaus was appointed new head coach of Arminia Bielefeld. He was sacked on 1 March 2021.

== Managerial statistics ==
As of match played 27 February 2021

Managerial record by team and tenure
Team	From	To	Record					
Team	From	To	G	W	D	L	Win %	Ref.
Wattenscheid 09 II	2 November 1995	30 June 1996	22	7	3	12	31.82	
VfB Hüls	1 October 1997	30 June 1998	28	7	8	13	25.00	
Borussia Dortmund II	3 June 2004	23 April 2005	30	10	7	13	33.33	
Rot-Weiss Essen	23 April 2005	8 November 2006	57	28	12	17	49.12	
Union Berlin	20 June 2007	30 June 2014	253	102	69	82	40.32	
Dynamo Dresden	1 July 2015	22 August 2018	116	49	35	32	42.24	
Arminia Bielefeld	10 December 2018	1 March 2021	77	34	21	22	44.16	
Total			583	237	155	191	40.65	—

== Honours ==
=== Manager ===
Manager

- 2. Bundesliga: (II)
  - Champions: 2019-2020

Individual

- 3. Liga Manager of the Year: 2015–16
