= Sören Brandy =

German footballer

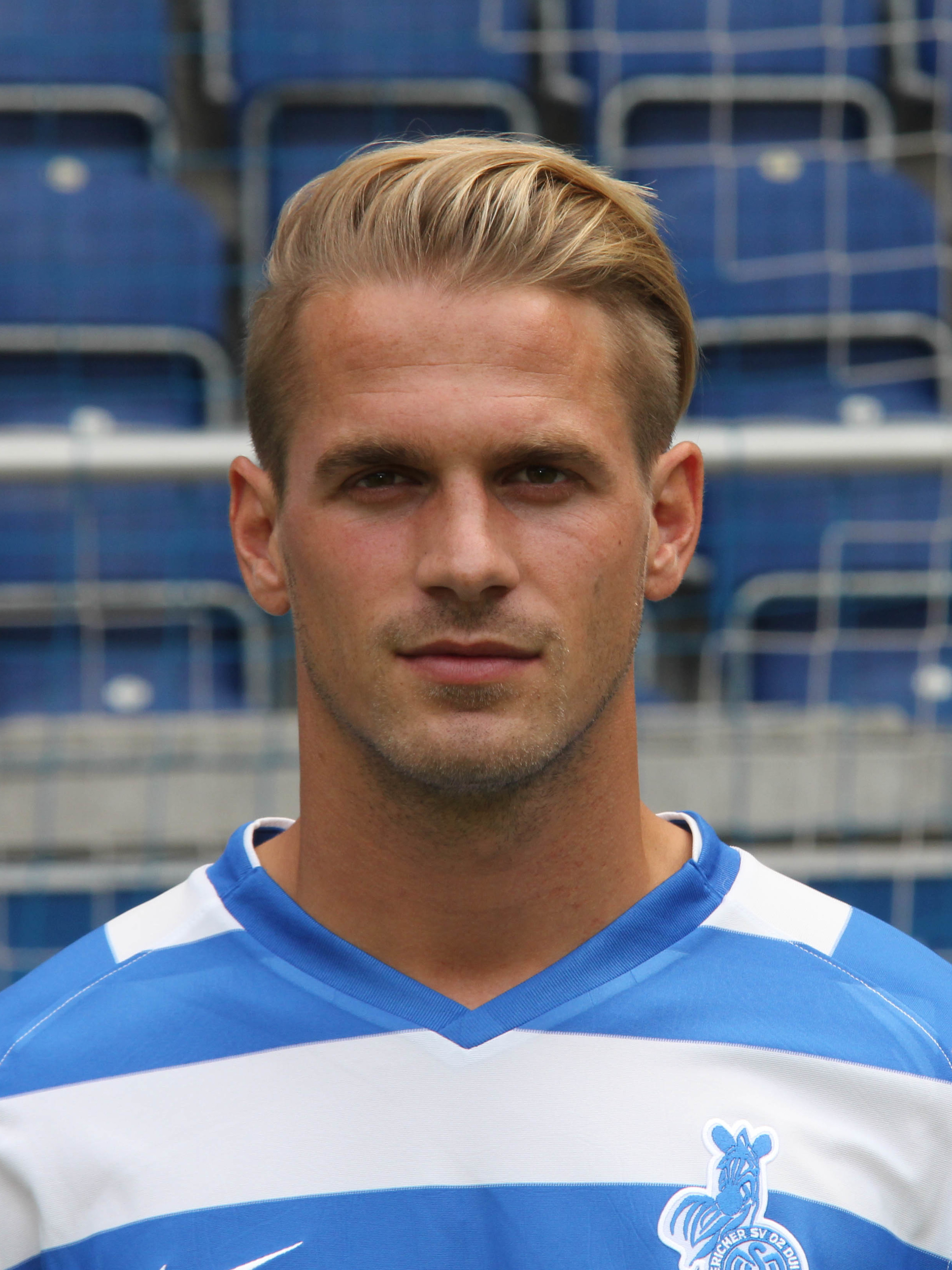
- Brandy with MSV Duisburg in 2012

Personal information
- Date of birth: 6 May 1985 (age 41)
- Place of birth: Verl, West Germany
- Height: 1.83 m (6 ft 0 in)
- Position: Forward

Youth career
- VfB Schloß Holte
- –2003: FC Gütersloh

Senior career*
Years	Team	Apps	(Gls)
2003–2006	FC Gütersloh	97	(17)
2006–2007	Holstein Kiel	12	(1)
2007–2008	Rot-Weiss Essen	33	(3)
2008–2012	SC Paderborn	109	(17)
2012–2013	MSV Duisburg	32	(6)
2013–2017	Union Berlin	87	(18)
2017–2019	Arminia Bielefeld	28	(1)
- * Club domestic league appearances and goals as of 13:51, 11 July 2019 (UTC)

Sören Brandy (born 6 May 1985) is a German footballer who last played for Arminia Bielefeld.
