= 2011–12 1. FC Kaiserslautern season =

1. FC Kaiserslautern
2011–12 season
- Manager: Marco Kurz (until 20 March); Krasimir Balakov (from 22 March until 17 May)
- Stadium: Fritz-Walter-Stadion
- Bundesliga: 18th (relegated)
- DFB Pokal: Third round

The 2011–12 1. FC Kaiserslautern season was the 112th season in club history.

== Season summary ==
Kaiserlautern finished the season in 18th place, and were relegated. Manager Marco Kurz had been sacked in March and replaced by Bulgarian Krasimir Balakov as a last roll of the dice, but to no avail. Balakov was sacked himself and replaced by former Sturm Graz manager Franco Foda.

== Players ==
=== First-team squad ===
Squad at end of season

Note: Flags indicate national team as defined under FIFA eligibility rules; some limited exceptions apply. Players may hold more than one non-FIFA nationality.

No.	Pos.	Nation	Player
1	GK	GER	Tobias Sippel
2	DF	CZE	Jan Šimůnek
3	DF	DEN	Leon Jessen
4	MF	POL	Ariel Borysiuk
6	DF	GER	Mathias Abel
7	MF	GER	Oliver Kirch
8	MF	GER	Christian Tiffert
9	FW	ISR	Itay Shechter
10	MF	TUR	Olcay Şahan (Note: Şahan was born in Düsseldorf, Germany.)
11	FW	GER	Sandro Wagner (on loan from Werder Bremen)
13	MF	GRE	Thanos Petsos (Note: Petsos was born in Düsseldorf, Germany.) (on loan from Bayer Leverkusen)
16	FW	GER	Richard Sukuta-Pasu
17	DF	GER	Alexander Bugera
19	MF	GER	Denis Linsmayer
20	DF	BRA	Rodnei
21	MF	GER	Pierre de Wit

No.	Pos.	Nation	Player
22	FW	DEN	Nicolai Jørgensen (on loan from Bayer Leverkusen)
23	DF	GER	Florian Dick
24	DF	BRA	Lucas Rocha (on loan from Bayer Leverkusen)
25	DF	ALG	Antar Yahia (Note: Yahia was born in Mulhouse, France.)
26	MF	GER	Steven Zellner
27	GK	AUT	Marco Knaller
28	MF	GRE	Kostas Fortounis
29	GK	GER	Kevin Trapp
30	MF	CMR	Dorge Kouemaha (on loan from Club Brugge)
31	FW	POL	Jakub Świerczok
32	GK	GER	Marius Müller
33	DF	GER	Dominique Heintz
34	DF	GER	Willi Orban (Note: Orban was born in Kaiserslautern, Germany, but also qualified to represent Hungary internationally and made his international debut for Hungary in 2018.)
35	FW	GER	Julian Derstroff
37	FW	GER	Andrew Wooten (Note: Wooten was born in Bamberg, Germany, but also qualified to represent the United States internationally through his father and would make his international debut for the United States in October 2015.)

=== Left club during season ===
Note: Flags indicate national team as defined under FIFA eligibility rules; some limited exceptions apply. Players may hold more than one non-FIFA nationality.

No.	Pos.	Nation	Player
4	MF	GER	Bastian Schulz (to RB Leipzig)
5	DF	GER	Martin Amedick (to Eintracht Frankfurt)
11	FW	BUL	Iliyan Mitsanski (on loan to FSV Frankfurt)
14	MF	ISR	Gil Vermouth (on loan to De Graafschap)
15	MF	AUT	Clemens Walch (on loan to Dynamo Dresden)

No.	Pos.	Nation	Player
18	FW	ALG	Chadli Amri (Note: Amri was born in Saint-Avold, France.) (on loan to FSV Frankfurt)
19	MF	CZE	Jiří Bílek (to Zagłębie Lubin)
22	MF	CRO	Ivo Iličević (Note: Iličević was born in Aschaffenburg, Germany.) (to Hamburg)
25	MF	CRO	Stiven Rivić (released)
32	FW	SVK	Adam Nemec (to FC Ingolstadt 04)

== Competitions ==
Win Draw Loss Postponed

=== Bundesliga ===
==== League table ====
Pos	Team	Pld	W	D	L	GF	GA	GD	Pts	Qualification or relegation
14	FC Augsburg	34	8	14	12	36	49	−13	38	
15	Hamburger SV	34	8	12	14	35	57	−22	36	
16	Hertha BSC (R)	34	7	10	17	38	64	−26	31	Qualification to relegation play-offs
17	1. FC Köln (R)	34	8	6	20	39	75	−36	30	Relegation to 2. Bundesliga
18	1. FC Kaiserslautern (R)	34	4	11	19	24	54	−30	23	Relegation to 2. Bundesliga

Source: kicker
Rules for classification: 1) points; 2) goal difference; 3) number of goals scored.
(R) Relegated
