= 2012–13 1. FC Kaiserslautern season =

1. FC Kaiserslautern
2012–13 season
- Chairman: Stefan Kuntz
- Manager: Franco Foda
- Stadium: Fritz-Walter-Stadion, Kaiserslautern, RP
- 2. Bundesliga: Third
- DFB-Pokal: Eliminated in Round 2
- Top goalscorer: League: Mohammadou Idrissou (17); All: Mohammadou Idrissou (17)
- Highest home attendance: 49,780
- Lowest home attendance: 23,006
Home colours	Away colours	Third colours

The 2012–13 1. FC Kaiserslautern season was the 113th season in club history. In 2012–13 the club played in the 2. Fußball-Bundesliga, the second tier of German football. It was the club's first season back in this league, after it was relegated from the Fußball-Bundesliga in 2012. They were denied an instant return to the top flight after finishing 3rd and losing in the relegation play-offs to TSG 1899 Hoffenheim 5–2 on aggregate.

The club also took part in the 2012–13 edition of the DFB-Pokal, the German Cup, where it reached the second round being eliminated by Bundesliga side FC Bayern Munich.

== Review and events ==
During the off-season, 1. FC Kaiserslautern hired Franco Foda as their new head coach.

== Friendly matches ==
Win Draw Loss Postponed

19 July 2012	HB Køge	1–3	1. FC Kaiserslautern	Kandel
	Kaagh 40'	Report	Vermouth 60'; Shechter 65'; Wooten 72'	Stadium: Bienwaldstadion; Attendance: 1,500; Referee: Markus Wingenbach

21 July 2012	Fulham F.C.	2–2	1. FC Kaiserslautern	Weingarten (Pfalz)
17:00	Petrić 20', 74'		Mitsanski 10'; Bugera 15'	Stadium: Arena Weingarten; Attendance: 2,550; Referee: Christian Dingert

28 July 2012	1. FC Kaiserslautern	1–0	FC Augsburg	Kaiserslautern
16:00	Idrissou 59'			Stadium: Fritz-Walter-Stadion; Attendance: 18,000

1 August 2012	1. FC Kaiserslautern	2–3	FC Bayern Munich	Kaiserslautern
18:30	Dick 35'; Shechter 89'		Müller 23'; Can 68'; Shaqiri 86'	Stadium: Fritz-Walter-Stadion; Attendance: 25,873; Referee: Christian Dingert

12 January 2013	SV Eintracht Trier 05	1–1	1. FC Kaiserslautern	Trier
14:00		Summary		Stadium: Moselstadion

16 January 2013	1. FC Kaiserslautern	1–3	Kickers Offenbach	Kaiserlautern
16:00		Summary		Stadium: Betzenberg Platz 4

20 January 2013	1. FC Kaiserslautern	3–1	Újpest FC	Belek
16:00		Summary		Stadium: Arcadia Futbol Kompleksi

21 January 2013	1. FC Kaiserslautern	0–0	FC Metalurh Zaporizhya	Belek
16:00		Summary		Stadium: Gloria Golf Resort

25 January 2013	1. FC Kaiserslautern	2–1	Daegu FC	Belek
14:00		Summary		Stadium: Arcadia Futbol Kompleksi

25 January 2013	1. FC Kaiserslautern	0–1	FC Red Bull Salzburg	Belek
14:00		Summary		Stadium: IC Santai Otel Futbol Sahaları

22 March 2013	1. FC Kaiserslautern	4–1	TSV 1860 München	Ludwigsburg
16:05		Summary		Stadium: Ludwig-Jahn-Stadion

== Competitions ==
Win Draw Loss Postponed

=== 2. Bundesliga ===
==== League table ====
Pos	Team	Pld	W	D	L	GF	GA	GD	Pts	Promotion, qualification or relegation
1	Hertha BSC (C, P)	34	22	10	2	65	28	+37	76	Promotion to Bundesliga
2	Eintracht Braunschweig (P)	34	19	10	5	52	34	+18	67	Promotion to Bundesliga
3	1. FC Kaiserslautern	34	15	13	6	55	33	+22	58	Qualification for promotion play-offs
4	FSV Frankfurt	34	16	6	12	55	45	+10	54	
5	1. FC Köln	34	14	12	8	43	33	+10	54	

Source: kicker.de
Rules for classification: 1) points; 2) goal difference; 3) number of goals scored.
(C) Champions; (P) Promoted

==== Matches ====
6 August 2012 1	1. FC Kaiserslautern	3–3	Union Berlin	Kaiserslautern
20:15	Idrissou 58' 72'; Zuck 86'	Report	47' Parensen; 54' Zoundi; 90+1' Pfertzel	Stadium: Fritz-Walter-Stadion; Attendance: 31,618; Referee: Tobias Stieler

10 August 2012 2	VfR Aalen	1–2	1. FC Kaiserslautern	Aalen
18:00	Bunjaku 17', 44'	Report	47' Dausch	Stadium: Scholz-Arena; Attendance: 12,038; Referee: Daniel Siebert

26 August 2012 3	1. FC Kaiserslautern	0–0	1860 München	Kaiserslautern
13:30	Alushi (yellow card) 66'; Dick (yellow card) 84'	Report	Guillermo Vallori (yellow card) 63'	Stadium: Fritz-Walter-Stadion; Attendance: 37,571; Referee: Markus Schmidt

31 August 2012 4	Dynamo Dresden	1–3	1. FC Kaiserslautern	Dresden
18:00	Brégerie (yellow card) 34'; Poté 67'	Report	Baumjohann (yellow card) 12'; Bunjaku 29', 74'; Dominique Heintz (yellow card) 50'; Borysiuk (yellow card) 55'; Fortounis 82'	Stadium: Glücksgas Stadium; Attendance: 29,057; Referee: Frank Willenborg

16 September 2012 5	1. FC Kaiserslautern	2–1	MSV Duisburg	Kaiserslautern
13:30	Zuck 41'; Dick (yellow card) 55'; Azaouagh 81'; Mitsanski (yellow card) 85'	Summary	Hoffmann (yellow card) 39'; Domovchiyski 62'; Kern (yellow card) 83'	Stadium: Fritz-Walter-Stadion; Attendance: 29,869; Referee: Christian Leicher

22 September 2012 6	1. FC Kaiserslautern	1–1	Hertha BSC	Kaiserslautern
13:00	Dick (yellow card) 5'; Idrissou (yellow card) 34' (goal) 66' (pen.); Azaouagh (yellow card) 71'; Mitsanski (yellow card) 83'	Summary	Niemeyer (yellow card) 32'; Ben-Hatira (yellow card) 58'; Bastians (yellow card) 60'; Ronny 69'	Stadium: Fritz-Walter-Stadion; Attendance: 32,069; Referee: Thorsten Kinhöfer

27 September 2012 7	VfL Bochum	1–2	1. FC Kaiserslautern	Bochum
20:15	Iashvili (yellow card) 48'; Tasaka 84'; Sinkiewicz (yellow card) 90+1'	Summary	Fortounis 36'; Marc Torrejón (yellow card) 47'; Idrissou 65'; Linsmayer (yellow card) 77'; Mitsanski (yellow card) 79'	Stadium: rewirpowerSTADION; Attendance: 13,212; Referee: Harm Osmers

30 September 2012 8	1. FC Kaiserslautern	1–1	Eintracht Braunschweig	Kaiserslautern
13:30	Dick 25'; Borysiuk (yellow card) 71'; Heintz (yellow card) 76'; Riedel (red card) 90+1'	Summary	Doğan (yellow card) 65'; Ademi 75'	Stadium: Fritz-Walter-Stadion; Attendance: 33,025; Referee: Daniel Siebert

7 October 2012 9	FC Ingolstadt 04	1–1	1. FC Kaiserslautern	Ingolstadt
13:30	Uludağ (yellow card) 11'; Schäfer (yellow card) 35'; Eigler (yellow card) 43'; Schäffler 80'	Summary	Torrejón (yellow card) 31'; Bunjaku 68'	Stadium: Audi Sportpark; Attendance: 7,011; Referee: Norbert Grudzinski

19 October 2012 10	1. FC Kaiserslautern	3–1	SV Sandhausen	Kaiserslautern
18:00	Idrissou 4' (yellow card) 72'; Zuck (yellow card) 20'; Bunjaku 24'; Zellner (yellow card) 65'; Hajri 90+1'	Summary	Achenbach 9' (yellow card) 76'; Kittner (yellow card) 11'; Morena (yellow card) 70'; Fießer (yellow card) 75'; Löning (yellow card) 78'	Stadium: Fritz-Walter-Stadion; Attendance: 27,526; Referee: Florian Steuer

26 October 2012 11	1. FC Köln	3–3	1. FC Kaiserslautern	Cologne
18:00	Chili 23' (pen.); Clemens 43'; Maroah (yellow card) 55'; Strobl (yellow card) 72'; Royer 75'	Summary	Baumjohann 9' (yellow card) 63'; Borysiuk (yellow card) 14'; Sippel (yellow card) 22'; Zellner (yellow card) 50'; Idrissou 60', 88'	Stadium: RheinEnergieStadion; Attendance: 44,601; Referee: Wolfgang Stark

5 November 2012 12	1. FC Kaiserslautern	4–1	Erzgebirge Aue	Kaiserslautern
20:15	Zuck 7'; Zellner (yellow card) 9'; Baumjohann 36', 79'; Idrissou (yellow card) 41' (goal) 81'	Report (in German)	Hochscheidt (yellow card) 11' (goal) 23'; Hensel (yellow card) 45'; Sylvestr (red card) 80'; König (yellow card) 88'	Stadium: Fritz-Walter-Stadion; Attendance: 23,372; Referee: Robert Hartmann

10 November 2012 13	SC Paderborn 07	1–1	1. FC Kaiserslautern	Paderborn
13:00	Strohdiek (yellow card) 55'; Jessen 57' (o.g.); Meha (yellow card) 59'; Krösche (yellow card) 66'; Kruse (yellow card) 67'	Report (in German)	Bunjaku (yellow card) 42'; Idrissou 68' (pen.); Linsmayer (red card) 69'	Stadium: Benteler Arena; Attendance: 11,471; Referee: Guido Winkmann

16 November 2012 14	1. FC Kaiserslautern	1–0	Energie Cottbus	Kaiserslautern
18:00	Zuck 13'; Borysiuk (yellow card) 59'; Idrissou (yellow card) 69'	Report (in German)	Banović (yellow card) 56'; Engel (yellow card) 58'; Kruska (yellow card) 59'; Fandrich (yellow card) 61'; Börner (yellow card) 82'	Stadium: Fritz-Walter-Stadion; Attendance: 29,622; Referee: Knut Kircher

24 November 2012 15	FSV Frankfurt	0–1	1. FC Kaiserslautern	Frankfurt
13:00	Huber (yellow card) 33'	Summary	Bunjaku 18' (pen.); Idrissou (yellow card) 43'; Dick (yellow card) 83'	Stadium: Stadion am Bornheimer Hang; Attendance: 10,470; Referee: Christian Leicher

27 November 2012 16	1. FC Kaiserslautern	1–1	Jahn Regensburg	Kaiserslautern
17:30	Bunjaku 45+2'; Azaouagh (yellow card) 53'; Dick (yellow card) 74'; Nsor (yellow card) 78'	Summary	Hagg 14'; Weidlich (yellow card) 37'; Wiegers (yellow card) 67'	Stadium: Fritz-Walter-Stadion; Attendance: 24,297; Referee: Markus Wingenbach

1 December 2012 17	FC St. Pauli	1–0	1. FC Kaiserslautern	Hamburg
13:00	Schachten (yellow card) 53'; Ginczek 67'; Buchtmann (yellow card) 86'	Summary	Idrissou (yellow card) 15'; Baumjohann (yellow card) 17'; Linsmayer (yellow card) 76'	Stadium: Millerntor-Stadion; Attendance: 21,045; Referee: Wolfgang Stark

7 December 2012 18	1. FC Union Berlin	2–0	1. FC Kaiserslautern	Berlin
17:00	Terodde 43', 66'; Mattuschka (yellow card) 56'; Kohlman (yellow card) 65'	Summary	Torrejón (yellow card) 45+1'; Heintz (yellow card) 51'; Dick (yellow card) 60'	Stadium: Stadion An der Alten Försterei; Attendance: 16,750; Referee: Markus Schmidt

14 December 2012 19	1. FC Kaiserslautern	0–1	VfR Aalen	Kaiserslautern
18:00	Idrissou (yellow card) 51'; Borysiuk (yellow card) 77'	Summary	Valentini 45'; Haller (yellow card) 72'	Stadium: Fritz-Walter-Stadion; Attendance: 23,006; Referee: Michael Wiener

4 February 2013 20	TSV 1860 München	0–1	1. FC Kaiserslautern	Munich
20:15		Summary	Idrissou (yellow card) 29'; Riedel 87'	Stadium: Allianz Arena; Attendance: 19,100; Referee: Daniel Siebert

8 February 2013 21	1. FC Kaiserslautern	3–0	Dynamo Dresden	Kaiserslautern
20:30	Karl 24'; Idrissou 40'; Drazen (yellow card) 70'; Hoffer 81'	Summary	Kempe (yellow card) 73'	Stadium: Fritz-Walter-Stadion; Attendance: 32,925; Referee: Deniz Aytekin

17 February 2013 22	MSV Duisburg	0–0	1. FC Kaiserslautern	Duisburg
13:30	Jovanović (yellow card) 18'; Šukalo (yellow card) 24' (red card) 40'; Brandy (yellow card) 59'; Wolze (yellow card) 90'	Summary	Karl (yellow card) 57'; Idrissou (yellow card) 60' (yellow-red card) 65'; Dick (yellow card) 85'	Stadium: MSV Arena; Attendance: 13,725; Referee: Thorsten Schriever

17 February 2013 23	Hertha BSC	1–0	1. FC Kaiserslautern	Berlin
20:15	Pekarík (yellow card) 27'; Schulz (yellow card) 41'; Kluge 68'	Summary	Sippel (yellow card) 3'; Baumjohann (red card) 33'; Löwe (yellow card) 35'	Stadium: Olympiastadion; Attendance: 37,347; Referee: Tobias Welz

2 March 2013 24	1. FC Kaiserslautern	0–0	VfL Bochum	Kaiserslautern
13:00	Karl (yellow card) 53'; Fortounis (yellow card) 64'; Borysiuk (yellow card) 90+1'	Summary	Rothenbach (yellow card) 49'	Stadium: Fritz-Walter-Stadion; Attendance: 26,896; Referee: Gunter Perl

11 March 2013 25	Eintracht Braunschweig	1–1	1. FC Kaiserslautern	Braunschweig
20:15	Pfitzner (yellow card) 21'; Kumbela 78'	Summary	Šimůnek (yellow card) 13'; Weiser 44'; Hoffer (yellow card) 88'	Stadium: Eintracht-Stadion; Attendance: 20,630; Referee: Marco Fritz

17 March 2013 26	1. FC Kaiserslautern	3–0	FC Ingolstadt 04	Kaiserslautern
13:30	Bunjaku 42' (pen.), 71'; Borysiuk (yellow card) 79'; Idrissou 87'	Summary	Schäfer (yellow card) 7'; Mitsanski (yellow card) 40'; Caiuby (yellow card) 45+1'; Mijatović (yellow card) 50'	Stadium: Fritz-Walter-Stadion; Attendance: 24,353; Referee: Bibiana Steinhaus

31 March 2013 27	SV Sandhausen	1–1	1. FC Kaiserslautern	Sandhausen
13:30	Achenbach (yellow card) 27'; Sippel 67' (o.g.); Pischorn (yellow card) 90'	Summary	Idrissou 18'; Borysiuk (yellow card) 25'	Stadium: Hardtwaldstadion; Attendance: 12,100; Referee: Bastian Dankert

5 April 2013 28	1. FC Kaiserslautern	3–0	1. FC Köln	Kaiserslautern
18:00	Idrissou 41', 79'; Šimůnek 50'	Summary	Maroh (yellow card) 12'; Clemens (yellow card) 23'; Strobl (yellow card) 39'	Stadium: Fritz-Walter-Stadion; Attendance: 49,780; Referee: Deniz Aytekin

15 April 2013 29	Erzgebirge Aue	1–1	1. FC Kaiserslautern	Aue
20:15	Pezzoni (yellow card) 36' (yellow-red card) 76'; Hochscheidt (yellow card) 42'; Paulus (yellow card) 60'; Klingbeil (red card) 66'; Schlitte 83'	Summary	Azaouagh (yellow card) 17'; Baumjohann 22'; Dick (yellow card) 54'	Stadium: Sparkassen-Erzgebirgsstadion; Attendance: 8,300; Referee: Felix Zwayer

20 April 2013 30	1. FC Kaiserslautern	3–0	SC Paderborn 07	Kaiserslautern
13:00	Weiser 18'; Hoffer (yellow card) 32'; Löwe (yellow card) 43'; Orban (yellow card) 53'; Idrissou 54'; Baumjohann 81'	Summary	Zeitz (yellow card) 62'; Hoffmann (yellow card) 78'	Stadium: Fritz-Walter-Stadion; Attendance: 28,702; Referee: Tobias Stieler

29 April 2013 31	FC Energie Cottbus	4–2	1. FC Kaiserslautern	Cottbus
20:15	Banović 32' (pen.); Sanogo 53', 90+2'; Fomitschow 81'; Bittroff (yellow card) 90'	Summary	Idrissou (yellow card) 9' (goal) 50'; Weiser (yellow card) 32'; Orban (yellow card) 83'; Bunjaku 86' (pen.) (yellow card) 89'	Stadium: Stadion der Freundschaft; Attendance: 7,545; Referee: Wolfgang Stark

5 May 2013 32	1. FC Kaiserslautern	4–1	FSV Frankfurt	Kaiserslautern
13:30	Bunjaku 27', 45+1'; Torrejón 40'; Köhler 45' (yellow card) 74'; Weiser (yellow card) 66'	Summary	Schlicke (yellow card) 81'; Kapllani 85'	Stadium: Fritz-Walter-Stadion; Attendance: 38,792; Referee: Michael Wiener

12 May 2013 33	SSV Jahn Regensburg	1–3	1. FC Kaiserslautern	Jahnstadion
13:30	Ziereis 27' (yellow card) 46'	Summary	Hoffer 12'; Idrissou 20'; Borysiuk (yellow card) 73'; Heintz (yellow card) 75'; Fortounis (yellow card) 80'; Orban 84'	Stadium: Stadion der Freundschaft; Attendance: 8,105; Referee: Thorsten Kinhöfer

19 May 2013 34	1. FC Kaiserslautern	1–2	FC St. Pauli	Kaiserslautern
13:30	Hoffer 71'	Summary	Daube 15' (yellow card) 39'; Ginczek 33'	Stadium: Fritz-Walter-Stadion; Attendance: 46,460; Referee: Robert Hartmann

==== Relegation play-offs ====
23 May 2013	TSG 1899 Hoffenheim	3–1	1. FC Kaiserslautern	Sinsheim
20:30	Roberto Firmino 11', 29'; Salihović (yellow card) 50'; Schipplock 67'; Beck (yellow card) 90+4'	Summary	Heintz (yellow card) 10'; Torrejón (yellow card) 55'; Idrissou 58'; Baumjohann (yellow card) 90+2'	Stadium: Rhein-Neckar Arena; Attendance: 30,150; Referee: Felix Brych

27 May 2013	1. FC Kaiserslautern	1–2 (2–5 agg.)	TSG 1899 Hoffenheim	Kaiserslautern
20:30	Borysiuk (yellow card) 5'; Sippel (yellow card) 27'; Idrissou (yellow card) 46'; Baumjohann 65'; Dick (yellow card) 90+3'	Summary	Thesker (yellow card) 11'; Abraham 44'; Casteels (yellow card) 70'; Vestergaard 74'; Weis (yellow card) 90+3'	Stadium: Fritz-Walter-Stadion; Attendance: 49,780; Referee: Florian Meyer

=== DFB-Pokal ===
19 May 2013 1st Rnd	Hansa Rostock	1–3	1. FC Kaiserslautern	Rostock
18:30	Mendy (yellow card) 38'; Smetana (yellow card) 45+3'; Plat 77'; Leemans (yellow card) 88'	Report (in German)	Bunjaku 49', 81'; Zuck 56'; Vermouth (yellow card) 89'; Fortounis 90+3'	Stadium: DKB-Arena; Attendance: 7,700; Referee: Florian Steuer

31 October 2012 2nd Rnd	Bayern Munich	4–0	1. FC Kaiserslautern	Munich
20:30	Pizarro 11', 58'; Robben 49', 88'	Report (in German)	Heintz (yellow card) 30'; Hajri (yellow card) 53'	Stadium: Allianz Arena; Attendance: 71,000; Referee: Daniel Siebert
