= 2019–20 Borussia Mönchengladbach season =

Borussia Mönchengladbach
2019–20 season
- President: Rolf Königs
- Manager: Marco Rose
- Stadium: Borussia-Park
- Bundesliga: 4th
- DFB-Pokal: Second round
- UEFA Europa League: Group stage
- Top goalscorer: League: Alassane Pléa; Marcus Thuram (10 each); All: Marcus Thuram (14)
Home colours	Away colours	Third colours

The 2019–20 Borussia Mönchengladbach season was the 120th season in the football club's history and 12th consecutive and 52nd overall season in the top flight of German football, the Bundesliga, having been promoted from the 2. Bundesliga in 2008. In addition to the domestic league, Borussia Mönchengladbach also participated in this season's edition of the domestic cup, the DFB-Pokal. This was the 16th season for Mönchengladbach in the Borussia-Park, located in Mönchengladbach, North Rhine-Westphalia, Germany. The season covered a period from 1 July 2019 to 30 June 2020.

== Players ==
=== Squad information ===
As of 14 January 2020

Note: Flags indicate national team as defined under FIFA eligibility rules; some limited exceptions apply. Players may hold more than one non-FIFA nationality.

No.	Pos.	Nation	Player
1	GK	SUI	Yann Sommer (vice-captain)
4	DF	FRA	Mamadou Doucouré
5	MF	GER	Tobias Strobl
6	MF	GER	Christoph Kramer
7	MF	GER	Patrick Herrmann
8	MF	Switzerland	Denis Zakaria
10	FW	FRA	Marcus Thuram
11	FW	BRA	Raffael
13	FW	GER	Lars Stindl (captain)
14	FW	FRA	Alassane Pléa
16	MF	GUI	Ibrahima Traoré
17	DF	SWE	Oscar Wendt
18	DF	AUT	Stefan Lainer

No.	Pos.	Nation	Player
19	MF	USA	Fabian Johnson
21	GK	GER	Tobias Sippel
22	MF	SVK	László Bénes
23	MF	GER	Jonas Hofmann
24	DF	GER	Tony Jantschke
25	DF	ALG	Ramy Bensebaini
26	FW	GER	Torben Müsel
28	DF	GER	Matthias Ginter
30	DF	SUI	Nico Elvedi
31	GK	GER	Max Grün
32	MF	GER	Florian Neuhaus
36	FW	SUI	Breel Embolo
37	MF	ENG	Keanan Bennetts

== Transfers ==
=== Transfers in ===
#	Position	Player	Transferred from	Fee	Date	Source
36	FW	(Switzerland) Breel Embolo	(Germany) Schalke 04	€10,000,000	28 June 2019	
31	GK	(Germany) Max Grün	(Germany) Darmstadt 98	Undisclosed	1 July 2019	
18	DF	(Austria) Stefan Lainer	(Austria) Red Bull Salzburg	€12,500,000	1 July 2019	
10	FW	(France) Marcus Thuram	(France) Guingamp	€9,000,000	22 July 2019	
25	DF	(Algeria) Ramy Bensebaini	(France) Rennes	€8,000,000	14 August 2019	

=== Transfers out ===
#	Position	Player	Transferred to	Fee	Date	Source
10	FW	(Belgium) Thorgan Hazard	(Germany) Borussia Dortmund	€25,500,000	22 May 2019	
18	FW	(Switzerland) Josip Drmić	(England) Norwich City	Free	25 June 2019	
27	MF	(France) Michaël Cuisance	(Germany) Bayern Munich	€12,000,000	17 August 2019	

==== Loans out ====
#	Position	Player	Loaned to	Date	Loan expires	Source
35	GK	(Germany) Moritz Nicolas	(Germany) Union Berlin	1 July 2019	30 June 2021	
3	DF	(Switzerland) Michael Lang	(Germany) Werder Bremen	29 August 2019	30 June 2020	
40	DF	(Denmark) Andreas Poulsen	Austria Wien	3 January 2020	30 June 2020	
20	FW	(Paraguay) Julio Villalba	(Austria) Rheindorf Altach	8 January 2020	30 June 2020	
15	DF	(Germany) Jordan Beyer	(Germany) Hamburger SV	14 January 2020	30 June 2020	

== Pre-season and friendlies ==
Win Draw Loss

10 July 2019 Friendly	Borussia Mönchengladbach	8–0	1.FC Mönchengladbach	Mönchengladbach, Germany
18:30 CEST (UTC+2)		Report		Stadium: Grenzlandstadion; Attendance: 2,300

17 July 2019 Friendly	Borussia Mönchengladbach	5–1	İstanbul Başakşehir	Kufstein, Austria
18:20 CEST (UTC+2)	Lainer 8'; Bénes 29'; Cuisance 42'; Italiano 47'; Raffael 85'	Report	Erdinç 22'	Stadium: Kufstein Arena; Referee: Walter Altmann (Austria)

20 July 2019 Friendly	Borussia Mönchengladbach	2–1	Rayo Vallecano	Rottach-Egern, Germany
16:00 CEST (UTC+2)		Report		Stadium: Sportplatz Birkenmoos

27 July 2019 Friendly	Angers	1–2	Borussia Mönchengladbach	Straelen, Germany
16:00 CEST (UTC+2)	Kanga 24'	Report	Johnson 72'; Herrmann 76'	Stadium: Stadion an der Römerstraße; Attendance: 2,500

28 July 2019 Friendly	Borussia Mönchengladbach	0–2	Athletic Bilbao	Velbert, Germany
16:00 CEST (UTC+2)		Report	Williams 15' (pen.); Córdoba 50'	Stadium: Christopeit Sport Arena; Attendance: 2,300; Referee: Florian Exner (Germany)

3 August 2019 Friendly	Borussia Mönchengladbach	2–2	Chelsea	Mönchengladbach, Germany
17:00 CEST (UTC+2)	Pléa 13'; Lainer (yellow card) 28'; Hofmann 39'; Elvedi (yellow card) 62'	Report	Emerson (yellow card) 8'; Kovačić (yellow card) 24'; Abraham 59' (pen.); Pedro (yellow card) 68'; Giroud (yellow card) 71'; Barkley 86' (pen.)	Stadium: Borussia-Park; Attendance: 24,500; Referee: Martin Thomsen (Germany)

5 September 2019 Friendly	Wehen Wiesbaden	1–1	Borussia Mönchengladbach	Haiger, Germany
18:15 CEST (UTC+2)	Kyereh 67'	Report	Traoré 29'	Stadium: Sportzentrum Haarwesen Haiger; Attendance: 2,000; Referee: Jonas Weickenmeier (Germany)

7 January 2020 Friendly	Borussia Mönchengladbach	1–3	Heracles Almelo	Jerez, Spain
15:00 CET (UTC+1)	Embolo 18'	Report	Dessers 33', 38'; Cijntje 50'	Stadium: Campo Hotel Barceló Montecastillo

10 January 2020 Friendly	Borussia Mönchengladbach	2–1	SC Freiburg	Jerez, Spain
13:00 CET (UTC+1)	Pléa 50', 65'	Report	Petersen 72'	Stadium: Campo Hotel Barceló Montecastillo; Attendance: 170; Referee: Alonso Ramirez (Spain)

10 January 2020 Friendly	Borussia Mönchengladbach	2–1	SC Freiburg	Jerez, Spain
15:00 CET (UTC+1)	Embolo 69'; Bennetts 88'	Report	Kath 59'	Stadium: Campo Hotel Barceló Montecastillo; Attendance: 170; Referee: Adrián Bazán Muñoz (Spain)

== Competitions ==
Win Draw Loss

=== Overview ===
Competition	First match	Last match	Starting round	Final position	Record							
Competition	First match	Last match	Starting round	Final position	Pld	W	D	L	GF	GA	GD	Win %
Bundesliga	17 August 2019	27 June 2020	Matchday 1	4th	34	20	5	9	66	40	+26	58.82
DFB-Pokal	9 August 2019	30 October 2019	First round	Second round	2	1	0	1	2	2	+0	50.00
Europa League	19 September 2019	12 December 2019	Group stage	Group stage	6	2	2	2	6	9	−3	33.33
Total					42	23	7	12	74	51	+23	54.76

Last updated: 27 June 2020
Source: Competitions

=== Bundesliga ===
==== League table ====
Pos	Team	Pld	W	D	L	GF	GA	GD	Pts	Qualification or relegation
2	Borussia Dortmund	34	21	6	7	84	41	+43	69	Qualification for the Champions League group stage
3	RB Leipzig	34	18	12	4	81	37	+44	66	Qualification for the Champions League group stage
4	Borussia Mönchengladbach	34	20	5	9	66	40	+26	65	Qualification for the Champions League group stage
5	Bayer Leverkusen	34	19	6	9	61	44	+17	63	Qualification for the Europa League group stage (Note: Since the winners of the 2019–20 DFB-Pokal, Bayern Munich, qualified for the Champions League based on league position, the Europa League group stage spot was passed to the sixth-placed team, and the Europa League second qualifying round spot was passed to the seventh-placed team.)
6	1899 Hoffenheim	34	15	7	12	53	53	0	52	Qualification for the Europa League group stage

Source: DFB
Rules for classification: 1) Points; 2) Goal difference; 3) Goals scored; 4) Head-to-head results; 5) Head-to-head away goals scored; 6) Away goals scored; 7) Play-off.

==== Results summary ====
Overall								Home						Away					
Pld	W	D	L	GF	GA	GD	Pts	W	D	L	GF	GA	GD	W	D	L	GF	GA	GD
34	20	5	9	66	40	+26	65	12	2	3	40	21	+19	8	3	6	26	19	+7

Last updated: 27 June 2020.
Source: Bundesliga

==== Results by round ====
Round	1	2	3	4	5	6	7	8	9	10	11	12	13	14	15	16	17	18	19	20	21	22	23	24	25	26	27	28	29	30	31	32	33	34
Ground	H	A	H	A	H	A	H	A	H	A	H	A	H	H	A	H	A	A	H	A	H	A	H	A	H	A	H	A	H	A	A	H	A	H
Result	D	W	L	W	W	W	W	L	W	W	W	L	W	W	L	W	D	L	W	D	W	W	D	W	L	W	L	D	W	L	L	W	W	W
Position	10	7	8	7	6	5	1	1	1	1	1	1	1	1	2	2	2	3	3	4	4	4	4	4	4	3	5	4	4	4	5	5	4	4

Updated to match(es) played on 27 June 2020. Source: DFB
A = Away; H = Home; W = Win; D = Draw; L = Loss

==== Matches ====
The Bundesliga schedule was announced on 28 June 2019.

17 August 2019 1	Borussia Mönchengladbach	0–0	Schalke 04	Mönchengladbach
18:30 CEST (UTC+2)	Neuhaus (yellow card) 15'; Bénes (yellow card) 57'; Lainer (yellow card) 89'	Report	Stambouli (yellow card) 16'; Caligiuri (yellow card) 63'	Stadium: Borussia-Park; Attendance: 54,022; Referee: Felix Brych

24 August 2019 2	Mainz 05	1–3	Borussia Mönchengladbach	Mainz
15:30 CEST (UTC+2)	Quaison 18'; Onisiwo (yellow card) 45'; Niakhaté (yellow card) 45+5'	Report	Lainer 31'; Pléa 77'; Embolo 79'; Zakaria (yellow card) 86'; Kramer (yellow card) 89'	Stadium: Opel Arena; Attendance: 28,005; Referee: Martin Petersen

30 August 2019 3	Borussia Mönchengladbach	1–3	RB Leipzig	Mönchengladbach
20:30 CEST (UTC+2)	Embolo (yellow card) 2', (goal) 90'; Zakaria (yellow card) 42'; Wendt (yellow card) 81'	Report	Laimer (yellow card) 18'; Werner 38', 47', 90+4'; Konaté (yellow card) 68'	Stadium: Borussia-Park; Attendance: 47,327; Referee: Sven Jablonski

14 September 2019 4	1. FC Köln	0–1	Borussia Mönchengladbach	Cologne
15:30 CEST (UTC+2)	Hector (yellow card) 20'; Risse (yellow card) 89'	Report	Pléa 14'; Kramer (yellow card) 26'; Elvedi (yellow card) 85'	Stadium: RheinEnergieStadion; Attendance: 50,000; Referee: Deniz Aytekin

22 September 2019 5	Borussia Mönchengladbach	2–1	Fortuna Düsseldorf	Mönchengladbach
15:30 CEST (UTC+2)	Lainer (yellow card) 2'; Thuram 74', 87'; Zakaria (yellow card) 77'	Report	Nuhu 6'; Bodzek (yellow card) 35'; Zimmermann (yellow card) 49'; Ayhan (yellow card) 65'	Stadium: Borussia-Park; Attendance: 52,413; Referee: Christian Dingert

28 September 2019 6	1899 Hoffenheim	0–3	Borussia Mönchengladbach	Hoffenheim
15:30 CEST (UTC+2)	Rudy (yellow card) 60'; Grillitsch (yellow card) 69'	Report	Lainer (yellow card) 7'; Pléa 43'; Thuram 65'; Zakaria (yellow card) 74'; Neuhaus 83'	Stadium: PreZero Arena; Attendance: 29,030; Referee: Harm Osmers

6 October 2019 7	Borussia Mönchengladbach	5–1	FC Augsburg	Mönchengladbach
13:30 CEST (UTC+2)	Zakaria 2'; Herrmann 8', 13', (yellow card) 28'; Pléa 39'; Embolo 83'	Report	Khedira (yellow card) 34'; Framberger (yellow card) 62'; Niederlechner 80'	Stadium: Borussia-Park; Attendance: 50,352; Referee: Robert Schröder

19 October 2019 8	Borussia Dortmund	1–0	Borussia Mönchengladbach	Dortmund
18:30 CEST (UTC+2)	Reus 58'; Delaney (yellow card) 61'	Report	Jantschke (yellow card) 88'; Neuhaus (yellow card) 90+1'	Stadium: Signal Iduna Park; Attendance: 81,365; Referee: Sascha Stegemann

27 October 2019 9	Borussia Mönchengladbach	4–2	Eintracht Frankfurt	Mönchengladbach
18:00 CET (UTC+1)	Thuram 28'; Neuhaus (yellow card) 31'; Wendt 45+2'; Elvedi 75'; Zakaria 85'	Report	Da Costa 59'; Abraham (yellow card) 74'; Hinteregger 79'	Stadium: Borussia-Park; Attendance: 52,300; Referee: Daniel Schlager

2 November 2019 10	Bayer Leverkusen	1–2	Borussia Mönchengladbach	Leverkusen
15:30 CET (UTC+1)	Volland 25'; Tah (yellow card) 36'; Baumgartlinger (yellow card) 44'; Bailey (red card) 90+6'	Report	Wendt 18'; Thuram 42'; Hofmann (yellow card) 80'	Stadium: BayArena; Attendance: 30,210; Referee: Daniel Siebert

10 November 2019 11	Borussia Mönchengladbach	3–1	Werder Bremen	Mönchengladbach
13:30 CET (UTC+1)	Elvedi (yellow card) 14'; Bensebaini 20', (yellow card) 52' (yellow-red card) 87'; Herrmann 22', 59', (yellow card) 70'; Lainer (yellow card) 25'	Report	Veljković (yellow card) 38'; Şahin (yellow card) 57'; Klaassen (yellow card) 75'; Friedl (yellow card) 81'; Bittencourt 90+3'	Stadium: Borussia-Park; Attendance: 54,022; Referee: Tobias Stieler

23 November 2019 12	Union Berlin	2–0	Borussia Mönchengladbach	Berlin
15:30 CET (UTC+1)	Ujah 15'; Kroos (yellow card) 29'; Andersson 90+2'	Report	Stindl (yellow card) 90+1'	Stadium: Stadion An der Alten Försterei; Attendance: 22,012; Referee: Felix Brych

1 December 2019 13	Borussia Mönchengladbach	4–2	SC Freiburg	Mönchengladbach
15:30 CET (UTC+1)	Thuram 3'; Herrmann (yellow card) 36', (goal) 51'; Bénes (yellow card) 40'; Embolo 46', 71'; Jantschke (yellow card) 57'	Report	Schmid 6'; Heintz (yellow card) 30'; Höler 58'; Koch (yellow card) 84'	Stadium: Borussia-Park; Attendance: 51,080; Referee: Felix Zwayer

7 December 2019 14	Borussia Mönchengladbach	2–1	Bayern Munich	Mönchengladbach
15:30 CET (UTC+1)	Bénes (yellow card) 6'; Bensebaini 60', 90+2' (pen.); Hofmann (yellow card) 66'; Zakaria (yellow card) 88'	Report	Perišić 49'; Boateng (yellow card) 62'; Martínez (yellow card) 82' (yellow-red card) 90+1'; Lewandowski (yellow card) 86'; Thiago (yellow card) 90+2'	Stadium: Borussia-Park; Attendance: 54,022; Referee: Marco Fritz

15 December 2019 15	VfL Wolfsburg	2–1	Borussia Mönchengladbach	Wolfsburg
15:30 CET (UTC+1)	Schlager 13', (yellow card) 71'; Brooks (yellow card) 20'; Roussillon (yellow card) 45+1'; Arnold 90+1'	Report	Embolo 15', (yellow card) 34'; Strobl (yellow card) 51'; Beyer (yellow card) 72'	Stadium: Volkswagen Arena; Attendance: 25,580; Referee: Felix Brych

18 December 2019 16	Borussia Mönchengladbach	2–0	SC Paderborn	Mönchengladbach
20:30 CET (UTC+1)	Jantschke (yellow card) 33'; Pléa 46'; Wendt (yellow card) 58'; Stindl 67' (pen.)	Report	Mamba (yellow card) 27'; Schonlau (yellow card) 66'; Vasiliadis (yellow card) 87'; Zolinski (yellow card) 87'	Stadium: Borussia-Park; Attendance: 44,494; Referee: Robert Kampka

21 December 2019 17	Hertha BSC	0–0	Borussia Mönchengladbach	Berlin
18:30 CET (UTC+1)	Selke (yellow card) 24'; Boyata (yellow card) 50'	Report	Bensebaini (yellow card) 21'; Zakaria (yellow card) 60'	Stadium: Olympiastadion; Attendance: 50,208; Referee: Harm Osmers

17 January 2020 18	Schalke 04	2–0	Borussia Mönchengladbach	Gelsenkirchen
20:30 CET (UTC+1)	Kenny (yellow card) 19'; Serdar 48'; Gregoritsch 58'; Kabak (yellow card) 76'; Schöpf (yellow card) 79'	Report	Lainer (yellow card) 31'; Thuram (yellow card) 51'; Jantschke (yellow card) 80'; Stindl (yellow card) 90+2'	Stadium: Veltins-Arena; Attendance: 62,217; Referee: Deniz Aytekin

25 January 2020 19	Borussia Mönchengladbach	3–1	Mainz 05	Mönchengladbach
15:30 CET (UTC+1)	Pléa 24', 76'; Embolo (yellow card) 85'; Neuhaus 88'	Report	Pierre-Gabriel (yellow card) 10'; Quaison 11'; Brosinski (yellow card) 81'; Baku (yellow card) 86'	Stadium: Borussia-Park; Attendance: 49,175; Referee: Felix Zwayer

1 February 2020 20	RB Leipzig	2–2	Borussia Mönchengladbach	Leipzig
18:30 CET (UTC+1)	Schick 50'; Werner (yellow card) 74'; Nkunku 89'	Report	Neuhaus (yellow card) 18'; Pléa 24', (yellow card) 61' (yellow-red card) 61'; Hofmann 35'; Elvedi (yellow card) 61'; Embolo (yellow card) 70'	Stadium: Red Bull Arena; Attendance: 42,146; Referee: Tobias Stieler

15 February 2020 22	Fortuna Düsseldorf	1–4	Borussia Mönchengladbach	Düsseldorf
18:30 CET (UTC+1)	Thommy 29'; Ayhan (yellow card) 68'; Jørgensen (yellow card) 90+1'	Report	Hofmann 22'; Stindl 51', 78', (yellow card) 71'; Thuram (yellow card) 75'; Neuhaus 82'	Stadium: Merkur Spiel-Arena; Attendance: 51,000; Referee: Daniel Siebert

22 February 2020 23	Borussia Mönchengladbach	1–1	1899 Hoffenheim	Mönchengladbach
15:30 CET (UTC+1)	Ginter 11'; Zakaria (yellow card) 21'; Stindl (yellow card) 39'; Wendt (yellow card) 56'; Herrmann (yellow card) 90+4'	Report	Skov (yellow card) 7'; Baumgartner (yellow card) 71'; Beier (yellow card) 89'; Ribeiro (yellow card) 90', (goal) 90+2'	Stadium: Borussia-Park; Attendance: 50,250; Referee: Felix Brych

29 February 2020 24	FC Augsburg	2–3	Borussia Mönchengladbach	Augsburg
15:30 CET (UTC+1)	Lichtsteiner (yellow card) 1'; Gouweleeuw (yellow card) 32'; Löwen 57'; Finnbogason 83'	Report	Bensebaini (yellow card) 12', (goal) 49'; Stindl 53', 79'; Ginter (yellow card) 76'	Stadium: WWK Arena; Attendance: 29,303; Referee: Markus Schmidt

7 March 2020 25	Borussia Mönchengladbach	1–2	Borussia Dortmund	Mönchengladbach
18:30 CET (UTC+1)	Stindl 50'; Kramer (yellow card) 62'; Bensebaini (yellow card) 76'; Ginter (yellow card) 84'; Lainer (yellow card) 89'; Neuhaus (yellow card) 90+1'	Report	Hazard 8'; Witsel (yellow card) 41'; Zagadou (yellow card) 45'; Hakimi 72'; Can (yellow card) 73'; Sancho (yellow card) 76'; Guerreiro (yellow card) 89'	Stadium: Borussia-Park; Attendance: 53,877; Referee: Sascha Stegemann

11 March 2020 21	Borussia Mönchengladbach	2–1	1. FC Köln	Mönchengladbach
18:30 CET (UTC+1)	Embolo 32'; Meré 70' (o.g.); Thuram (yellow card) 88'	Report	Kainz (yellow card) 33'; Uth 81', (yellow card) 84'	Stadium: Borussia-Park; Attendance: 0 Referee: Deniz Aytekin
Note: Match originally scheduled for 9 February, but postponed to 11 March due to poor weather conditions caused by Storm Ciara.

16 May 2020 26	Eintracht Frankfurt	1–3	Borussia Mönchengladbach	Frankfurt
18:30 CEST (UTC+2)	Kostić (yellow card) 24'; Ndicka (yellow card) 36'; Silva (yellow card) 59', (goal) 81'; Ilsanker (yellow card) 70'; Kohr (yellow card) 89'	Report	Pléa 1'; Thuram 7'; Elvedi (yellow card) 9'; Bensebaini 72' (pen.)	Stadium: Commerzbank-Arena; Attendance: 0 Referee: Felix Zwayer
Note: The match was postponed on 13 March due to the pandemic of COVID-19 in Germany, and rescheduled to 16 May.

23 May 2020 27	Borussia Mönchengladbach	1–3	Bayer Leverkusen	Mönchengladbach
15:30 CEST (UTC+2)	Thuram 52'; Bensebaini (yellow card) 71'	Report	Havertz 7', 58' (pen.); Diaby (yellow card) 62'; S. Bender 81'	Stadium: Borussia-Park; Attendance: 0 Referee: Sören Storks
Note: The match was postponed on 13 March due to the pandemic of COVID-19 in Germany, and rescheduled to 23 May.

26 May 2020 28	Werder Bremen	0–0	Borussia Mönchengladbach	Bremen
20:30 CEST (UTC+2)	Gebre Selassie (yellow card) 34'; Veljković (yellow card) 41'	Report	Jantschke (yellow card) 47'	Stadium: Weser-Stadion; Attendance: 0 Referee: Manuel Gräfe
Note: The match was postponed on 24 March due to the pandemic of COVID-19 in Germany, and rescheduled to 26 May.

31 May 2020 29	Borussia Mönchengladbach	4–1	Union Berlin	Mönchengladbach
15:30 CEST (UTC+2)	Neuhaus 17', (yellow card) 61'; Hofmann (yellow card) 33'; Thuram 41', 59'; Lainer (yellow card) 43'; Pléa 81'	Report	Bülter (yellow card) 19'; Friedrich (yellow card) 30'; Andersson 50'	Stadium: Borussia-Park; Attendance: 0 Referee: Frank Willenborg
Note: The match was postponed on 24 March due to the pandemic of COVID-19 in Germany, and rescheduled to 31 May.

5 June 2020 30	SC Freiburg	1–0	Borussia Mönchengladbach	Freiburg
20:30 CEST (UTC+2)	Waldschmidt (yellow card) 16'; Kübler (yellow card) 27'; Koch (yellow card) 40'; Petersen 58'; Höfler (yellow card) 85'	Report	Pléa (yellow card) 22' (yellow-red card) 68'; Lainer (yellow card) 45+1'	Stadium: Schwarzwald-Stadion; Attendance: 0 Referee: Markus Schmidt
Note: The match was postponed on 24 March due to the pandemic of COVID-19 in Germany, and rescheduled to 5 June.

13 June 2020 31	Bayern Munich	2–1	Borussia Mönchengladbach	Munich
18:30 CEST (UTC+2)	Zirkzee 26'; Goretzka 86'	Report	Pavard 37' (o.g.); Bensebaini (yellow card) 45'; Lainer (yellow card) 69'	Stadium: Allianz Arena; Attendance: 0 Referee: Felix Zwayer
Note: The match was postponed on 24 March due to the pandemic of COVID-19 in Germany, and rescheduled to 13 June.

16 June 2020 32	Borussia Mönchengladbach	3–0	VfL Wolfsburg	Mönchengladbach
18:30 CEST (UTC+2)	Hofmann 11', 30'; Stindl 65'; Elvedi (yellow card) 73'	Report	Pongračić (yellow card) 29'; Weghorst (yellow card) 63'; Mbabu (yellow card) 82'; Guilavogui (yellow card) 85'	Stadium: Borussia-Park; Attendance: 0 Referee: Robert Schröder
Note: The match was postponed on 24 March due to the pandemic of COVID-19 in Germany, and rescheduled to 16 June.

20 June 2020 33	SC Paderborn	1–3	Borussia Mönchengladbach	Paderborn
15:30 CEST (UTC+2)	Sabiri (yellow card) 14'; Michel 54', (yellow card) 86'; Hünemeier (yellow card) 55' (yellow-red card) 66'	Report	Herrmann 4'; Bensebaini (yellow card) 42'; Jantschke (yellow card) 52'; Stindl 55' (pen.), 73'	Stadium: Benteler-Arena; Attendance: 0 Referee: Tobias Welz
Note: The match was postponed on 24 March due to the pandemic of COVID-19 in Germany, and rescheduled to 20 June.

27 June 2020 34	Borussia Mönchengladbach	2–1	Hertha BSC	Mönchengladbach
15:30 CEST (UTC+2)	Hofmann 7'; Kramer (yellow card) 43'; Embolo 78'	Report	Skjelbred (yellow card) 50'; Stark (yellow card) 52'; Ibišević 90+1'	Stadium: Borussia-Park; Attendance: 0 Referee: Deniz Aytekin
Note: The match was postponed on 7 May due to the pandemic of COVID-19 in Germany, and rescheduled to 27 June.

=== DFB-Pokal ===
9 August 2019 First round	SV Sandhausen	0–1	Borussia Mönchengladbach	Sandhausen
21:30 CEST (UTC+2)	Scheu (yellow card) 31'; Linsmayer (yellow card) 40'; Förster (yellow card) 79'; Behrens (yellow card) 84'	Report	Thuram 18'; Embolo (yellow card) 90'	Stadium: BWT-Stadion am Hardtwald; Attendance: 13,695; Referee: Robert Hartmann

30 October 2019 Second round	Borussia Dortmund	2–1	Borussia Mönchengladbach	Dortmund
20:45 CET (UTC+1)	Schulz (yellow card) 69'; Brandt 77', 80'	Report	Thuram 71'; Zakaria (yellow card) 83'; Neuhaus (yellow card) 90'; Rose (red card) 90+1'	Stadium: Signal Iduna Park; Attendance: 79,800; Referee: Benjamin Cortus

=== Europa League ===
==== Group stage ====
Pos	Team	Pld	W	D	L	GF	GA	GD	Pts	Qualification	IBS	ROM	MGB	WLB
1	(Turkey) İstanbul Başakşehir	6	3	1	2	7	9	−2	10	Advance to knockout phase	—	0–3	1–1	1–0
2	(Italy) Roma	6	2	3	1	12	6	+6	9	Advance to knockout phase	4–0	—	1–1	2–2
3	(Germany) Borussia Mönchengladbach	6	2	2	2	6	9	−3	8		1–2	2–1	—	0–4
4	(Austria) Wolfsberger AC	6	1	2	3	7	8	−1	5		0–3	1–1	0–1	—

Source: UEFA
Rules for classification: Group stage tiebreakers

19 September 2019 1	Borussia Mönchengladbach (Germany)	0–4	(Austria) Wolfsberger AC	Mönchengladbach, Germany
21:00 CEST (UTC+2)	Bénes (yellow card) 44'; Pléa (yellow card) 50'; Zakaria (yellow card) 64'; Kramer (yellow card) 77'	Report	Weissman 13'; Ritzmaier (yellow card) 26', (goal) 41'; Leitgeb 31', 68'; Rnić (yellow card) 36'; Schmitz (yellow card) 51'; Schmid (yellow card) 67'	Stadium: Borussia-Park; Attendance: 40,000; Referee: Tamás Bognár (Hungary)

3 October 2019 2	İstanbul Başakşehir (Turkey)	1–1	(Germany) Borussia Mönchengladbach	Istanbul, Turkey
18:55 CEST (UTC+2)	Škrtel (yellow card) 14'; Caiçara (yellow card) 25'; Višća 55'; Gulbrandsen (yellow card) 86'	Report	Embolo (yellow card) 40'; Elvedi (yellow card) 53'; Kramer (yellow card) 64'; Herrmann (yellow card) 84', (goal) 90+1'	Stadium: Başakşehir Fatih Terim Stadium; Attendance: 6,000; Referee: Stuart Attwell (England)

24 October 2019 3	Roma (Italy)	1–1	(Germany) Borussia Mönchengladbach	Rome, Italy
18:55 CEST (UTC+2)	Zaniolo 32'; Veretout (yellow card) 50'; Kluivert (yellow card) 72'; Antonucci (yellow card) 90+2'; Smalling (yellow card) 90+3'	Report	Bensebaini (yellow card) 65'; Lainer (yellow card) 81'; Stindl 90+5' (pen.)	Stadium: Stadio Olimpico; Attendance: 29,037; Referee: Willie Collum (Scotland)

7 November 2019 4	Borussia Mönchengladbach (Germany)	2–1	(Italy) Roma	Mönchengladbach, Germany
21:00 CET (UTC+1)	Fazio 35' (o.g.); Bénes (yellow card) 45'; Bensebaini (yellow card) 88'; Thuram 90+5', (yellow card) 90+5'; Kramer (yellow card) 90+6'; Neuhaus (yellow card) 90+6'	Report	Mancini (yellow card) 41'; Fazio 64'; Santon (yellow card) 87'; Diawara (yellow card) 90+3'	Stadium: Borussia-Park; Attendance: 44,570; Referee: Jesús Gil Manzano (Spain)

28 November 2019 5	Wolfsberger AC (Austria)	0–1	(Germany) Borussia Mönchengladbach	Graz, Austria
18:55 CET (UTC+1)	Gollner (yellow card) 62'	Report	Stindl 60'	Stadium: Liebenauer Stadium; Attendance: 12,073; Referee: Serdar Gözübüyük (Netherlands)

12 December 2019 6	Borussia Mönchengladbach (Germany)	1–2	(Turkey) İstanbul Başakşehir	Mönchengladbach, Germany
21:00 CET (UTC+1)	Thuram 33'	Report	Kahveci 44'; Topal (yellow card) 64'; Elia (yellow card) 70'; Crivelli 90+1'; Günok (yellow card) 90+4'	Stadium: Borussia-Park; Attendance: 40,046; Referee: José María Sánchez Martínez (Spain)

== Statistics ==
=== Appearances and goals ===
No.	Pos	Nat	Player	Total		Bundesliga		DFB-Pokal		Europa League	
No.	Pos	Nat	Player	Apps	Goals	Apps	Goals	Apps	Goals	Apps	Goals
Goalkeepers
1	GK	(Switzerland) SUI	Yann Sommer	42	0	34	0	2	0	6	0
21	GK	(Germany) GER	Tobias Sippel	0	0	0	0	0	0	0	0
31	GK	(Germany) GER	Max Grün	0	0	0	0	0	0	0	0
Defenders
4	DF	(France) FRA	Mamadou Doucouré	2	0	0+2	0	0	0	0	0
17	DF	(Sweden) SWE	Oscar Wendt	31	2	18+7	2	1+1	0	4	0
18	DF	(Austria) AUT	Stefan Lainer	39	1	31	1	2	0	6	0
24	DF	(Germany) GER	Tony Jantschke	19	0	11+6	0	0	0	2	0
25	DF	(Algeria) ALG	Ramy Bensebaini	26	5	16+3	5	1	0	3+3	0
28	DF	(Germany) GER	Matthias Ginter	36	1	31	1	1	0	4	0
30	DF	(Switzerland) SUI	Nico Elvedi	39	1	30+2	1	2	0	5	0
38	DF	(Germany) GER	Marcel Benger	0	0	0	0	0	0	0	0
Midfielders
5	MF	(Germany) GER	Tobias Strobl	12	0	6+4	0	1	0	1	0
6	MF	(Germany) GER	Christoph Kramer	26	0	17+5	0	0	0	4	0
7	MF	(Germany) GER	Patrick Herrmann	33	7	16+11	6	0+1	0	2+3	1
8	MF	(Switzerland) SUI	Denis Zakaria	31	2	22+1	2	2	0	6	0
16	MF	(Guinea) GUI	Ibrahima Traoré	7	0	1+6	0	0	0	0	0
19	MF	(United States) USA	Fabian Johnson	7	0	3+3	0	0+1	0	0	0
22	MF	(Slovakia) SVK	László Bénes	28	0	10+12	0	1+1	0	3+1	0
23	MF	(Germany) GER	Jonas Hofmann	29	5	18+6	5	2	0	1+2	0
32	MF	(Germany) GER	Florian Neuhaus	37	4	26+4	4	2	0	5	0
37	MF	(England) ENG	Keanan Bennetts	1	0	0+1	0	0	0	0	0
Forwards
10	FW	(France) FRA	Marcus Thuram	39	14	28+3	10	2	2	6	2
11	FW	(Brazil) BRA	Raffael	11	0	0+8	0	0	0	0+3	0
13	FW	(Germany) GER	Lars Stindl	30	11	14+11	9	1	0	2+2	2
14	FW	(France) FRA	Alassane Pléa	33	10	25+2	10	1	0	3+2	0
26	FW	(Germany) GER	Torben Müsel	1	0	0+1	0	0	0	0	0
36	FW	(Switzerland) SUI	Breel Embolo	34	8	17+11	8	0+1	0	3+2	0
Players transferred out during the season
3	DF	(Switzerland) SUI	Michael Lang	0	0	0	0	0	0	0	0
15	DF	(Germany) GER	Jordan Beyer	4	0	0+3	0	1	0	0	0
20	FW	(Paraguay) PAR	Julio Villalba	0	0	0	0	0	0	0	0
27	MF	(France) FRA	Michaël Cuisance	0	0	0	0	0	0	0	0
40	DF	(Denmark) DEN	Andreas Poulsen	0	0	0	0	0	0	0	0
44	FW	(Germany) GER	Charalambos Makridis	1	0	0	0	0+1	0	0	0

Last updated: 27 June 2020
Source: Competitions
