= Tobias Sippel =

German footballer (born 1988)

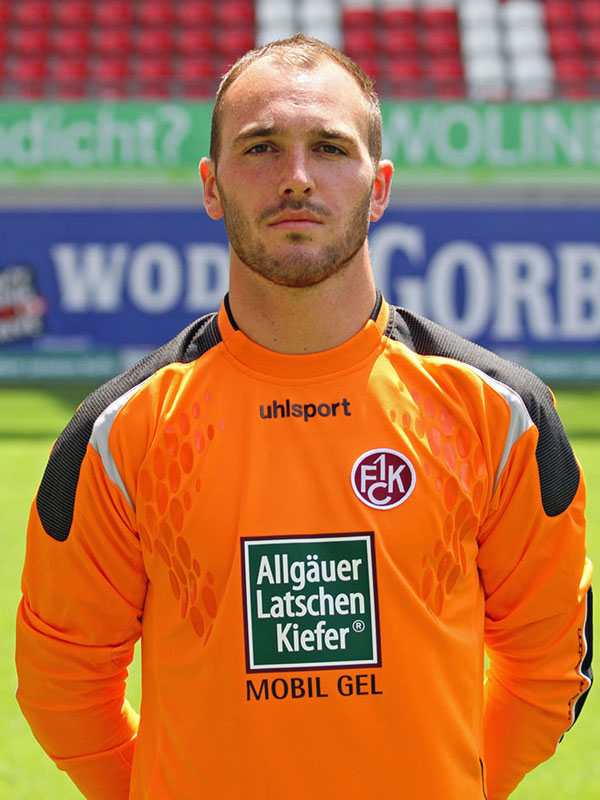
- Sippel with Kaiserslautern in 2011

Personal information
- Full name: Tobias Sippel
- Date of birth: 22 March 1988 (age 38)
- Place of birth: Bad Dürkheim, West Germany
- Height: 1.83 m (6 ft 0 in)
- Position: Goalkeeper

Team information
- Current team: Borussia Mönchengladbach
- Number: 21

Youth career
- 1993–1998: SV 1911 Bad Dürkheim
- 1998–2005: 1. FC Kaiserslautern

Senior career*
Years	Team	Apps	(Gls)
2005–2011	1. FC Kaiserslautern II	18	(0)
2006–2015	1. FC Kaiserslautern	177	(0)
2015–	Borussia Mönchengladbach	19	(0)

International career^{‡}
2007	Germany U19	1	(0)
2008–2010	Germany U21	9	(0)
Medal record
Men's football
Representing Germany
UEFA European Under-21 Championship
Winner	2009 Sweden
- * Club domestic league appearances and goals as of 22 February 2025 ‡ National team caps and goals as of 19 March 2013

Tobias Sippel (born 22 March 1988) is a German professional footballer who plays as a goalkeeper for Bundesliga club Borussia Mönchengladbach.

== Career ==
=== Early career ===
Born in Bad Dürkheim, Sippel began his football career playing for his hometown club SV 1911 Bad Dürkheim. He rose through the youth ranks culminating as the first goalkeeper for their 2005 entry in the Regionalliga Süd (tier four of the German football league system) at the age of 17.

=== Kaiserslautern ===
In 2006, then-Bundesliga club 1. FC Kaiserslautern signed him to his first professional contract.

Sippel spent one season playing with Kaiserslautern II in the Oberliga Südwest (then tier four of the German football league system). After one year, he joined the first team as the third keeper behind Jürgen Macho and Florian Fromlowitz. The previous season had seen Kaiserslautern relegated from the Bundesliga to the 2. Bundesliga. He ascended to the second keeper behind U-21 national keeper Fromlowitz when Macho left Kaiserslautern to play for the Greek club AEK Athens.

Ten games into the 2007–08 season, Fromlowitz was injured thrusting Sippel into the role of starting goalkeeper. He helped Kaiserslautern avoid relegation to the 3. Liga on the last day of the season with a clean sheet versus already promoted 1. FC Köln.

The 2008–09 campaign started with a bang for Sippel as Kaiserslautern shot to the top of the league table anchored by their number one goalkeeper, however nine games into the season, Sippel broke his arm on a freak play during a 2–1 win versus Rot-Weiß Oberhausen. He was placed on injured reserve until the beginning of 2009.

=== Borussia Mönchengladbach ===
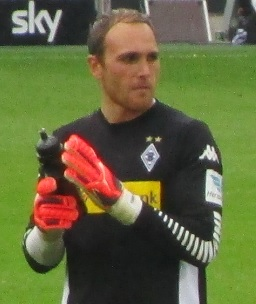
Sippel with Gladbach in 2015

On 26 May 2015, Sippel joined Borussia Mönchengladbach on free transfer, signing a three-year deal.

=== International ===
Sippel was called up to the senior Germany squad by Joachim Löw in the build up to the 2010 FIFA World Cup.

== Career statistics ==
=== Club ===
As of match played 22 February 2025.

Appearances and goals by club, season and competition
Club	Season	League			Cup		Continental		Other		Total	
Club	Season	Division	Apps	Goals	Apps	Goals	Apps	Goals	Apps	Goals	Apps	Goals
1. FC Kaiserslautern II	2005–06	Regionalliga Süd	5	0	—		—		—		5	0
1. FC Kaiserslautern II	2006–07	Regionalliga Süd	3	0	—		—		—		3	0
1. FC Kaiserslautern II	2007–08	Oberliga Südwest	9	0	—		—		—		9	0
1. FC Kaiserslautern II	2010–11	Regionalliga West	1	0	—		—		—		1	0
1. FC Kaiserslautern II	Total		18	0	—		—		—		18	0
1. FC Kaiserslautern	2006–07	2. Bundesliga	0	0	0	0	—		—		0	0
1. FC Kaiserslautern	2007–08	2. Bundesliga	25	0	1	0	—		—		26	0
1. FC Kaiserslautern	2008–09	2. Bundesliga	15	0	0	0	—		—		15	0
1. FC Kaiserslautern	2009–10	2. Bundesliga	33	0	2	0	—		—		35	0
1. FC Kaiserslautern	2010–11	Bundesliga	25	0	4	0	—		—		29	0
1. FC Kaiserslautern	2011–12	Bundesliga	11	0	0	0	—		—		11	0
1. FC Kaiserslautern	2012–13	2. Bundesliga	34	0	2	0	—		2 (Note: Appearance(s) in Bundesliga promotion play-offs.)	0	38	0
1. FC Kaiserslautern	2013–14	2. Bundesliga	33	0	4	0	—		—		37	0
1. FC Kaiserslautern	2014–15	2. Bundesliga	29	0	1	0	—		—		30	0
1. FC Kaiserslautern	Total		205	0	14	0	—		2	0	221	0
Borussia Mönchengladbach	2015–16	Bundesliga	2	0	0	0	0	0	—		2	0
Borussia Mönchengladbach	2016–17	Bundesliga	0	0	1	0	0	0	—		1	0
Borussia Mönchengladbach	2017–18	Bundesliga	5	0	0	0	—		—		5	0
Borussia Mönchengladbach	2018–19	Bundesliga	0	0	1	0	—		—		1	0
Borussia Mönchengladbach	2019–20	Bundesliga	0	0	0	0	0	0	—		0	0
Borussia Mönchengladbach	2020–21	Bundesliga	4	0	4	0	0	0	—		8	0
Borussia Mönchengladbach	2021–22	Bundesliga	1	0	1	0	—		—		2	0
Borussia Mönchengladbach	2022–23	Bundesliga	6	0	1	0	—		—		7	0
Borussia Mönchengladbach	2023–24	Bundesliga	0	0	0	0	—		—		0	0
Borussia Mönchengladbach	2024–25	Bundesliga	1	0	0	0	—		—		1	0
Borussia Mönchengladbach	2025–26	Bundesliga	0	0	0	0	—		—		0	0
Borussia Mönchengladbach	Total		19	0	8	0	0	0	—		27	0
Career total			242	0	22	0	0	0	2	0	266	0

== Honours ==
=== Club ===
1. FC Kaiserslautern

- 2. Bundesliga: 2009–10

=== International ===
Germany

- UEFA Under-21 Championship: 2009
