= Kostas Fortounis =

Greek footballer (born 1992)

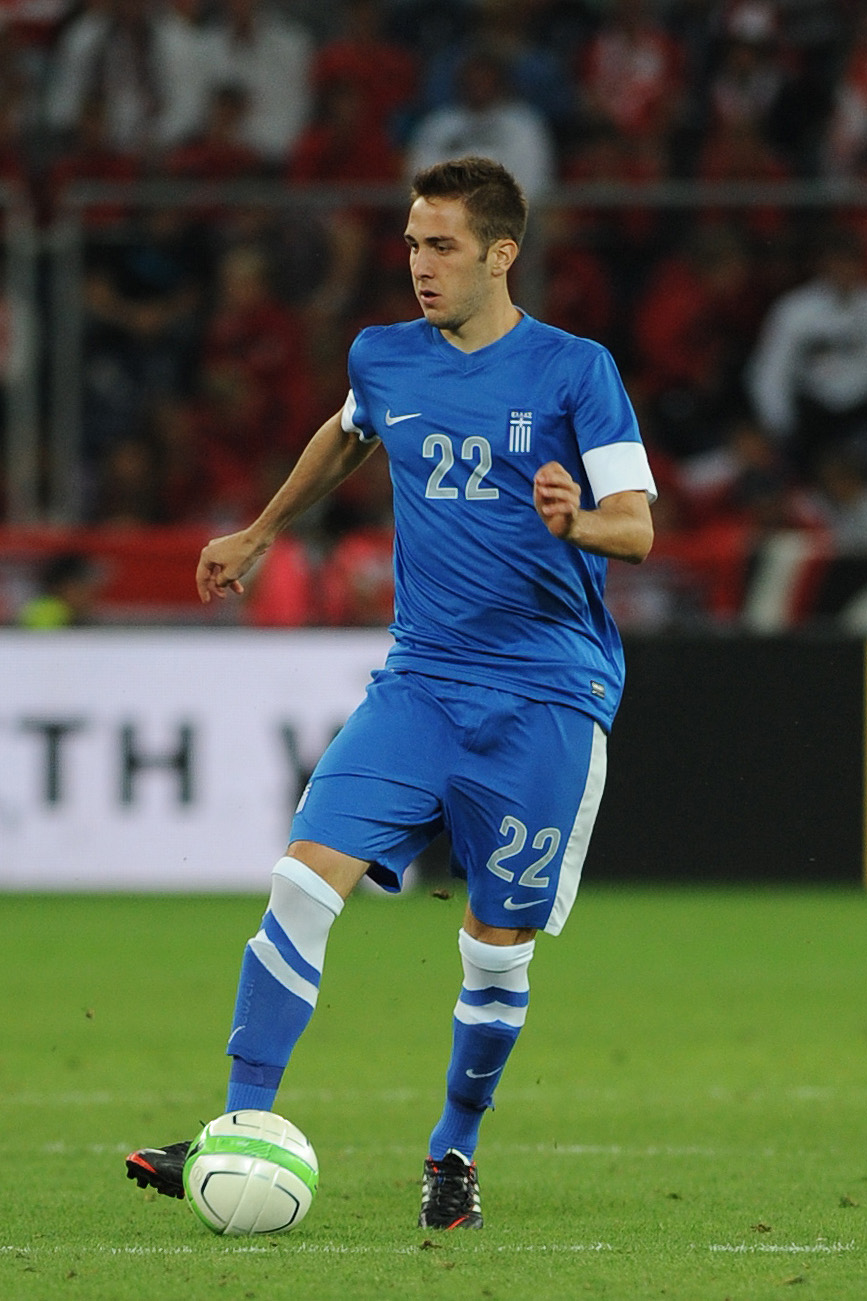
- Fortounis playing for Greece in 2013

Personal information
- Full name: Konstantinos Fortounis
- Date of birth: 16 October 1992 (age 34)
- Place of birth: Trikala, Greece
- Height: 1.83 m (6 ft 0 in)
- Positions: Attacking midfielder; winger

Team information
- Current team: Olympiacos
- Number: 7

Youth career
- 2003–2008: Olympiacos
- 2008–2009: Trikala

Senior career*
Years	Team	Apps	(Gls)
2008–2010	Trikala	13	(0)
2010–2011	Asteras Tripolis	24	(1)
2011–2014	1. FC Kaiserslautern	70	(2)
2014–2024	Olympiacos	230	(75)
2022	Olympiacos B	2	(1)
2024–2026	Al-Khaleej	59	(19)
2026–	Olympiacos	9	(0)

International career^{‡}
2010–2011	Greece U19	15	(1)
2011–2015	Greece U21	14	(4)
2012–2023	Greece	56	(9)
- * Club domestic league appearances and goals as of 22 November 2026 ‡ National team caps and goals as of 1 September 2023

Konstantinos "Kostas" Fortounis (Greek: Κώστας Φορτούνης, pronounced [ˈkostas forˈtunis]; born 16 October 1992) is a Greek professional footballer who plays as an attacking midfielder or a winger for Super League club Olympiacos. He was born in Trikala, Thessaly but comes from the nearby village of Sarakina, close to the town of Kalabaka.

== Club career ==
=== Trikala ===
After leaving Olympiacos' youth team in 2008, Fortounis moved to Trikala to play for AO Trikala. After an impressive spell in the Under-21 side scoring four goals in 14 matches, he began his career with the first team in the fourth division, where from 2008 to 2010 he played in 13 matches and scored 1 goal.

=== Asteras Tripolis ===
Because of his good appearances with the Greece under-17 national team, Vangelis Vlachos, Asteras Tripolis' manager convinced him to join the Peloponeesean team. He made his debut in a draw with PAOK in Tripolis. Used predominantly as a substitute, the teenager clocked up 24 league appearances, scoring his first Super League goal on 19 September 2010 in a 2–2 draw at AEK Athens, unable, however, to save the side from relegation. Due to his good performances at Asteras, Juventus made an offer in the winter transfer window for a loan transfer until summer with an option to buy him. Asteras finally declined Juventus's offer.

=== 1. FC Kaiserslautern ===
In the 2011 summer transfer window, Fortounis moved to Kaiserslautern on a contract until June 2015 after being transferred for an undisclosed fee. In his first season with the club, the midfielder made 28 league appearances but endured a second successive relegation. He reportedly attracted interest from Dutch champions Ajax and Italian champions Juventus midway through the season.

In the 2012–13 season he scored twice in 24 appearances as he helped Kaiserslautern to a third-place finish in the German second tier only to miss out on promotion due to defeat in the promotion/relegation play-off with Hoffenheim. On 16 April 2014, he missed his first final of his career in the semifinal of DFB-Pokal by facing as a substitute a 5–1 loss from the German champions Bayern Munich.

=== Olympiacos ===
On 21 July 2014, Fortounis signed a five-year contract with Olympiacos, returning after six years. He said he chose the club ahead of PAOK and Panathinaikos because they could offer him Champions League football, but was left out of the squad for that competition. He scored his first goal for Olympiacos in the Super League match against PAS Giannina on 6 December, a penalty kick in a 2–2 draw, and went on to score 7 goals from 25 appearances in the 2014–15 Super League. Fortounis helped Olympiacos reach the 2015 Cup Final, in which he scored the third goal with a 25-yard (23 m) free kick as they beat Skoda Xanthi 3–1 to complete the double with a record 27th cup win.

Fortounis scored Olympiacos' first goal of the 2015–16 Super League season in a 3–0 win over Panionios. In the second match of the season, against Levadiakos, he secured the victory by scoring the second goal in stoppage time and was named "Man of the Match". On 22 September 2015, he scored twice in Olympiacos's 3–1 defeat of Skoda Xanthi and assisted Jimmy Durmaz for the opening goal. He was again named "Man of the Match". He scored for the second league match running against PAS Giannina in a 5–1 home win. On 29 September, away to Arsenal in the Champions League group stage, he was involved in Felipe Pardo's opening goal and his corner led to goalkeeper David Ospina fumbling the ball over the goalline to give Olympiacos a 2–1 lead, a performance that earned him a spot in the Champions League Team of the Week. On the seventh matchday of the Super League he scored two goals in a 4–0 home win against AEK after being brought onto the pitch in the second half.

Fortounis missed a penalty before making an assist in the 90th minute to secure a 2–1 victory over 10-man Dinamo Zagreb in the Champions League in November. He netted twice (one penalty) helping his club to reach a 3–1 home win against his former club Asteras Tripolis on 29 November; it was the 11th win in a row for the club equalling the club record from the 1966–67 season. On 5 December, he scored a penalty in a 4–3 away win against Panthrakikos. Two weeks later Fortounis converted two penalties in a 2–0 victory against AEL Kalloni, their 15th win of the first half of the season during which they remained unbeaten. On 31 January 2016, he scored a brace and assisted once in his club's 3–0 win over PAS Giannina at Zosimades Stadium. He scored his first goal in European competition on 25 February with a penalty kick in a 2–1 home defeat to Anderlecht that eliminated Olympiacos from the 2015–16 Europa League at the round of 32 stage. On 20 March, Fortounis became the third player in Olympiacos' history to score 10 goals and make 10 assists in a season (after Predrag Đorđević in 2001–02, 2002–03 and 2003–04, and Chori Dominguez in 2014–15). In the final match of the Super League season, Fortounis scored his 18th goal, which made him the league's top scorer by a three-goal margin; he was also the top assister with 12, as his team won their sixth consecutive title.

Despite interest from clubs including Bayer Leverkusen and Tottenham Hotspur, Fortounis' contract with Olympiacos was extended to 2020. He scored his first goal of the 2016–17 season on 2 October 2016 in the 3–0 home derby win against AEK. On 24 November 2016, in a UEFA Europa League group stage he scored from a free-kick to open scoring in a final 1–1 home draw against BSC Young Boys and was chosen MVP of the match. On 28 February 2017, he helped his club, as a substitute, to escape with a vital 2–1 away win for the quarter-finals of Greek Cup, against Atromitos by equalizing the score and giving the assist for the winning goal. On 5 April 2017, he opened the score in a crucial 2–0 away win against Kerkyra, helping his club in their effort to win the 7th consecutive championship. He finished the season with 40 appearances (8 goals, 8 assists) in all competitions.

Fortounis scored twice in a 4–1 home win against AEL on the opening day of the 2017–18 Super League season, and the following week scored the only goal of the visit to Lamia from the penalty spot. On 14 October, he was the man of the match away to Panionios; after providing the assist for Pape Abou Cissé's early equaliser, he won and then converted the late penalty that gave his side a 4–3 win. In March 2018, Fortounis opened the scoring with a penalty in the home derby with Panathinaikos, played behind closed doors as punishment for misbehaviour by supporters; the match ended 1–1. He finished the season with 37 appearances (11 goals, 14 assists) in all competitions.

He was named Olympiacos captain in August 2018. He contributed two goals and an assist to his team beating 10-man Burnley in the Europa League play-off round. After two goals and an assist in a 5–1 defeat of F91 Dudelange in the Europa League group stage in November 2018, Fortounis was named in the tournament's Team of the Week. On 13 December against AC Milan, he converted an 81st-minute penalty that gave Olympiacos the two-goal winning margin needed to qualify for the knockout rounds. On 30 January 2019, Fortounis scored a hat-trick at home to Larissa, and three weeks later scored twice in a 4–1 win at home to champions AEK Athens. His free kick on 21 April 2019 in a 3–1 away win against Lamia was in vain as PAOK beat Levadiakos to secure the Super League title. Fortounis finished the season with 43 appearances (17 goals, 16 assists) in all competitions.

Fortounis agreed a new four-year contract in June 2019. In July, he suffered a ruptured cruciate ligament and was expected to be out for six months.

On 15 January 2020, after a very difficult year for the Greek international marred by injury (184 days to be exact), Fortounis made his return as a substitute in a 4–1 home Greek Cup last 16 game against Kalamata. On 15 February 2020, he scored his first goal after his serious injury for the 2019–20 season, in stylish fashion as the Greek international skipped passed them with a minimum of fuss before scoring with an emphatic shot in a hammering 4–0 home win against Panionios. Fortounis finished the season with 21 appearances (3 goals, 3 assists) in all competitions.

On 18 September 2020, in the 2020–21 Super League Greece opener game, the entry of Fortounis in the beginning of the second half, along with his first goal in the season, changed the image of the match and Olympiakos started the championship with a 3–0 home win against Asteras Tripolis. On 24 October 2020, according to club's reports, Fortounis rejected a €3 million per year offer for a three-year contract from Saudi Arabia club Al Nassr FC. Fortounis finished the season with 46 appearances (9 goals, 11 assists) in all competitions.

On 27 June 2021, he twisted into an unsuspecting phase during the first test match against Wolfsberger AC, resulting in a cruciate ligament rupture in his left knee. Two years ago he suffered the same injury to his right knee in another test match against Hamburger SV (early July) and was out of action for six months. Fortounis, after a difficult 2021–22 season, finished the 2022–23 season with 28 appearances (4 goals, 9 assists) in all competitions. He finished the 2023–24 season with 49 appearances (11 goals, 19 assists) in all competitions.

Fortounis eventually led Olympiacos to their second European title in the 2023-24 season (after the youth team won the UEFA Youth League in the same season), the UEFA Europa Conference League, which was won by beating Fiorentina 1–0 in the final with a goal by Ayoub El Kaabi after extra time.

=== Al-Khaleej ===
On 30 August 2024, Fortounis joined Saudi Pro League club Al-Khaleej on a two-year deal, receiving a salary of €6.4 million per year. He finished his first season with 31 appearances (10 goals, 5 assists) in all competitions.

=== Return to Olympiacos ===
On 2 June 2026, Olympiacos teased Fortounis' return to the club after a two-year span at Al-Khaleej. The tease was a video of the back of Olympiacos' new kit with the number 7, the number Fortounis wore while playing for the club. He was announced the same day by the club.

== International career ==
He has represented Greece at U-21, U-19 and U-17 level.

Fortounis' debut with the Greece came against Belgium in February 2012 as a suspension with the U-21 side allowed Fernando Santos to call-up the Kaiserslautern's prospect to the senior squad. Showing plenty of maturity against the Belgians, Fortounis was also given test runs against Slovenia and Armenia in the final two Greece friendlies ahead of UEFA Euro 2012. Strong runs down the left flank in Greece's friendlies allowed Fortounis to form a strong bond with the likes of Giorgos Karagounis and José Holebas down the left side; thus forming a strong chemistry between the trio all the while improving Greece's transition game and attack. Eventually was in the Greece national team for Euro 2012.

Fortounis was not a part of the Greece national team for 2014 FIFA World Cup in Brazil. Eventually his transfer to Olympiacos was beneficial for his career. He started playing again for the national team, being a key player for the squad. On 29 March 2016, on the 19th minute he converts the penalty with a right footed shot to the bottom right corner and 12 minutes later, with a right footed shot from the centre of the box to the bottom left corner, gave a 2–0 lead in a lost 2–3 friendly international game against Iceland. On 8 October 2016, after a solid performance against Cyprus that sealed with a 2–0 victory, the international attacking midfielder suffered an injury and missed an away match of Greece national team against Estonia on 10 October.

Due to disputes with the then coach of the National Team, Gustavo Poyet, Fortounis eventually retired from the national team.

== Career statistics ==
=== Club ===
As of match played 25 October 2026

Club	Season	League			National cup (Note: Includes Greek Cup, DFB-Pokal, King's Cup)		Continental		Total	
Club	Season	Division	Apps	Goals	Apps	Goals	Apps	Goals	Apps	Goals
Trikala	2008–09	Delta Ethniki	—		—		—		—	
Trikala	2009–10	Delta Ethniki	13	0	—		—		13	0
Trikala	Total		13	0	—		—		13	0
Asteras Tripolis	2010–11	Super League Greece	24	1	2	0	—		26	1
1. FC Kaiserslautern	2011–12	Bundesliga	28	0	2	0	—		30	0
1. FC Kaiserslautern	2012–13	2. Bundesliga	24	2	2	1	—		26	3
1. FC Kaiserslautern	2013–14	2. Bundesliga	18	0	3	0	—		21	0
1. FC Kaiserslautern	Total		70	2	7	1	—		77	3
Olympiacos	2014–15	Super League Greece	25	7	10	3	2 (Note: Appearances in UEFA Europa League)	0	37	10
Olympiacos	2015–16	Super League Greece	27	18	4	2	8 (Note: Six appearances in UEFA Champions League, two appearances and one goal in UEFA Europa League)	1	39	21
Olympiacos	2016–17	Super League Greece	25	6	4	1	11 (Note: Two appearances in UEFA Champions League, nine appearances and one goal in UEFA Europa League)	1	40	8
Olympiacos	2017–18	Super League Greece	25	10	3	0	9 (Note: Appearances in UEFA Champions League)	1	37	11
Olympiacos	2018–19	Super League Greece	28	12	3	0	12	5	43	17
Olympiacos	2019–20	Super League Greece	13	3	5	0	3	0	21	3
Olympiacos	2020–21	Super League Greece	31	9	4	0	11 (Note: Seven appearances in UEFA Champions League, four appearances in UEFA Europa League)	0	46	9
Olympiacos	2021–22	Super League Greece	3	0	0	0	0	0	3	0
Olympiacos	2022–23	Super League Greece	25	4	3	0	0	0	28	4
Olympiacos	2023–24	Super League Greece	28	6	2	0	19 (Note: Ten appearances and three goals in UEFA Europa League, nine appearances and two goals in UEFA Conference League)	5	49	11
Olympiacos	2026–27	Super League Greece	6	0	2	0	2	0	8	0
Olympiacos	Total		236	75	40	6	77	13	353	94
Olympiacos B	2021–22	Super League Greece 2	2	1	—		—		2	1
Al-Khaleej	2024–25	Saudi Pro League	30	9	1	1	—		31	10
Al-Khaleej	2025–26	Saudi Pro League	29	10	1	0	—		30	10
Al-Khaleej	Total		59	19	2	1	—		61	20
Career total			404	99	51	8	77	13	532	119

=== International ===
As of match played 31 March 2021

Appearances and goals by national team and year
National team	Year	Apps	Goals
Greece	2012	10	0
Greece	2013	2	0
Greece	2014	0	0
Greece	2015	5	0
Greece	2016	7	3
Greece	2017	8	0
Greece	2018	7	1
Greece	2019	5	3
Greece	2020	7	2
Greece	2021	3	0
Greece	2022	2	0
Total		56	9

As of match played 15 November 2020. Greece score listed first, score column indicates score after each Fortounis goal.

International goals by date, venue, cap, opponent, score, result and competition
No.	Date	Venue	Cap	Opponent	Score	Result	Competition	Ref.
1	29 March 2016	Karaiskakis Stadium, Piraeus, Greece	19	Iceland	1–0	2–3	Friendly	
2	29 March 2016	Karaiskakis Stadium, Piraeus, Greece	19	Iceland	2–0	2–3	Friendly	
3	6 September 2016	Estádio Algarve, Faro/Loulé, Portugal	21	Gibraltar	3–1	4–1	2018 FIFA World Cup qualification	
4	8 September 2018	A. Le Coq Arena, Tallinn, Estonia	34	Estonia	1–0	1–0	2018–19 UEFA Nations League C	
5	23 March 2019	Rheinpark Stadion, Vaduz, Liechtenstein	40	Liechtenstein	1–0	2–0	UEFA Euro 2020 qualification	
6	26 March 2019	Bilino Polje Stadium, Zenica, Bosnia and Herzegovina	41	Bosnia and Herzegovina	1–2	2–2	UEFA Euro 2020 qualification	
7	11 June 2019	Olympic Stadium, Athens, Greece	44	Armenia	2–3	2–3	UEFA Euro 2020 qualification	
8	7 October 2020	Wörthersee Stadion, Klagenfurt, Austria	46	Austria	1–0	1–2	Friendly	
9	15 November 2020	Zimbru Stadium, Chișinău, Moldova	50	Moldova	1–0	2–0	2020–21 UEFA Nations League C	

== Honours ==
Olympiacos

- Super League Greece: 2014–15, 2015–16, 2016–17, 2019–20, 2020–21, 2021–22
- Greek Football Cup: 2014–15, 2019–20; runner-up: 2015–16, 2020–21
- UEFA Conference League: 2023–24

Individual

- UEFA European Under-19 Championship Team of the Tournament: 2011
- Super League Greece Player of the Season: 2015–16, 2018–19
- Super League Greece Greek Footballer of the Season: 2015–16, 2018–19
- Super League Greece Top scorer: 2015–16
- Super League Greece Team of the Season: 2015–16, 2016–17, 2018–19
- Super League Greece Player of the Month: November 2020
- Super League Greece Goal of the Season: 2022–23 (vs Ionikos)
- Super League Greece top assist provider: 2015–16, 2017–18, 2018–19, 2020–21
- Olympiacos Goal of the Season: 2015–16 (against Asteras Tripolis)
- UEFA Conference League Team of the Season: 2023–24

Record

- Most assists in the history of Olympiacos.
