= Willi Orbán =

Hungary international footballer (born 1992)

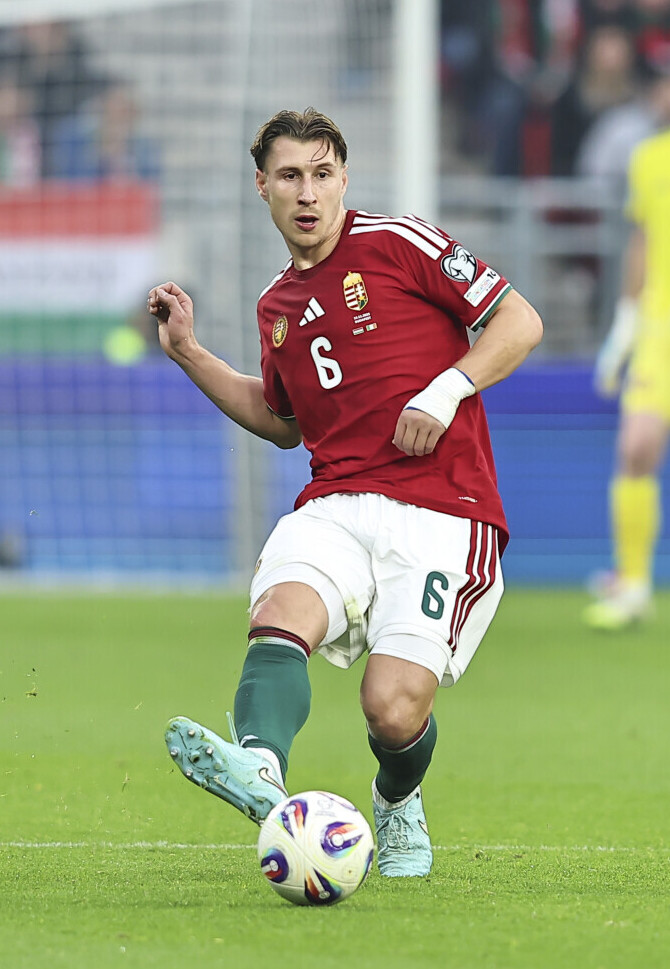
- Orbán playing for Hungary in 2025

Personal information
- Full name: Willi Thomas Orbán
- Birth name: Vilmos Thomas Orbán
- Date of birth: 3 November 1992 (age 34)
- Place of birth: Kaiserslautern, Germany
- Height: 1.86 m (6 ft 1 in)
- Position: Centre-back

Team information
- Current team: RB Leipzig
- Number: 4

Youth career
- 1997–2011: 1. FC Kaiserslautern

Senior career*
Years	Team	Apps	(Gls)
2011–2013	1. FC Kaiserslautern II	35	(7)
2011–2015	1. FC Kaiserslautern	68	(7)
2015–	RB Leipzig	299	(30)

International career^{‡}
2014	Germany U21	2	(0)
2018–	Hungary	72	(6)
- * Club domestic league appearances and goals as of 31 October 2026 ‡ National team caps and goals as of 5 October 2026

Vilmos "Willi" Thomas Orbán (born 3 November 1992) is a professional footballer who plays as a centre-back for Bundesliga club RB Leipzig. Born in Germany, he plays for the Hungary national team.

== Club career ==
=== 1. FC Kaiserslautern ===
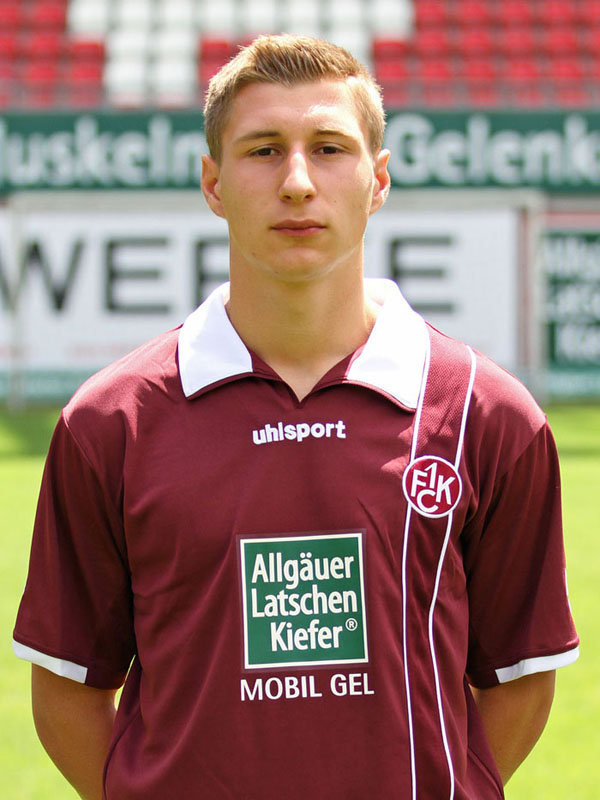
Orbán with 1. FC Kaiserslautern in 2011

Orbán started his career in the 1. FC Kaiserslautern youth academy as a four-year-old and progressed through the ranks of the club's academy by playing for the club's U17 and U19 sides.

At the start of the 2011–12 season, Orbán was then promoted to 1. FC Kaiserslautern II squad. Shortly after, he was called up to the first team by Manager Marco Kurz. He made his first-team debut in a match against Bayern Munich on 27 August 2011. But his return was short–lived when he suffered an injury that kept him out for a month. Despite this, he signed his first professional contract with the club, keeping him until 2014.

Orbán received his first start against 1. FC Nürnberg on 26 November, deputising for suspended right back Florian Dick. Orbán made the team 6 times in the Bundesliga, but spent most of his time with the reserve team, 1. FC Kaiserslautern II, in the fourth tier, scoring three goals in 23 matches.

Orbán split the following season with the first team and the reserve team, but managed to break into the first team down the stretch, starting 4 of Kaiserslautern's final 5 matches in the 2012–13 2. Bundesliga. He scored his first goal with the first team in a 3–1 victory over Jahn Regensburg FC on 12 May 2013. Orbán also started both legs of Kaiserslautern's promotion playoff against 1899 Hoffenheim as the club sought an immediate return to the Bundesliga. Kaiserslautern lost 5–2 on aggregate, remaining in the second division. At the end of the 2012–13 season, he made nine appearances and scoring once in all competitions.

The 2013–14 season saw Orbán's breakthrough by getting more playing time, establishing himself in the centre–back position. On 26 July 2013, he signed a new contract with the club, keeping him until 2016. Orbán then captained the side for the first time on 12 August 2013, starting the whole game, in a 2–1 loss against Greuther Fürth. In a follow–up match against Erzgebirge Aue, Orbán suffered a broken nose, but continued to play throughout the match, which he wore a mask. In mid–September, Orbán began playing in the defensive midfield position, though he played in the centre–back position as well. It wasn't until on 20 October 2013 when he scored his first goal for the club, in a 2–2 draw against Karlsruher SC.

Two months later on 3 December 2013 in the round of 16 of the DFB-Pokal, Orbán scored and set up the second goal of the goal, in a 3–1 win over Union Berlin. His third goal for the side came on 26 March 2014, in a 1–1 draw against Arminia Bielefeld. In a match against FC St. Pauli on 11 April 2014, Orbán was sent–off for a second bookable offence, as 1. FC Kaiserslautern won 3–2. At the end of the 2013–14 season, he went on to make thirty–two appearances and scoring three times in all competitions.

In the 2014–15 season, Orbán continued to regain his first team place for the side, initially starting out in the centre–back position. He then scored his first goal of the season on 12 August 2014, in a 1–0 win over FSV Frankfurt. Three months later on 14 December 2014, Orbán scored a brace, as 1. FC Kaiserslautern won 3–0 against Erzgebirge Aue. Following the departure of Srđan Lakić, it was announced that Orbán was named as a captain, succeeding Lakić. He captained the side in a number of matches for the rest of the season. During a 2–1 win over 1. FC Nürnberg on 14 March 2015, which he set up one of the goals, Orbán suffered an injury and had to be substituted in the 55th minute. But he quickly recovered from the injury he sustained against 1. FC Nürnberg. Orbán then scored his fourth goal of the season on 4 April 2015, in a 4–1 win over 1. FC Heidenheim. At the end of the 2014–15 season, he went on to make thirty–one appearances and scoring four times in all competitions. For his performance, Orbán was named the club's player of the year.

By the time of his departure, Orbán made seventy–seven appearances and scoring times in all competitions for 1. FC Kaiserslautern. During his time at 1. FC Kaiserslautern, he was the club's fan favourite and was subjected of a chant by supporters, calling him: "Williiiiie". However, upon moving to RB Leipzig, the move caused much anger from the fans of 1. FC Kaiserslautern.

=== RB Leipzig ===
==== 2015–16 season ====
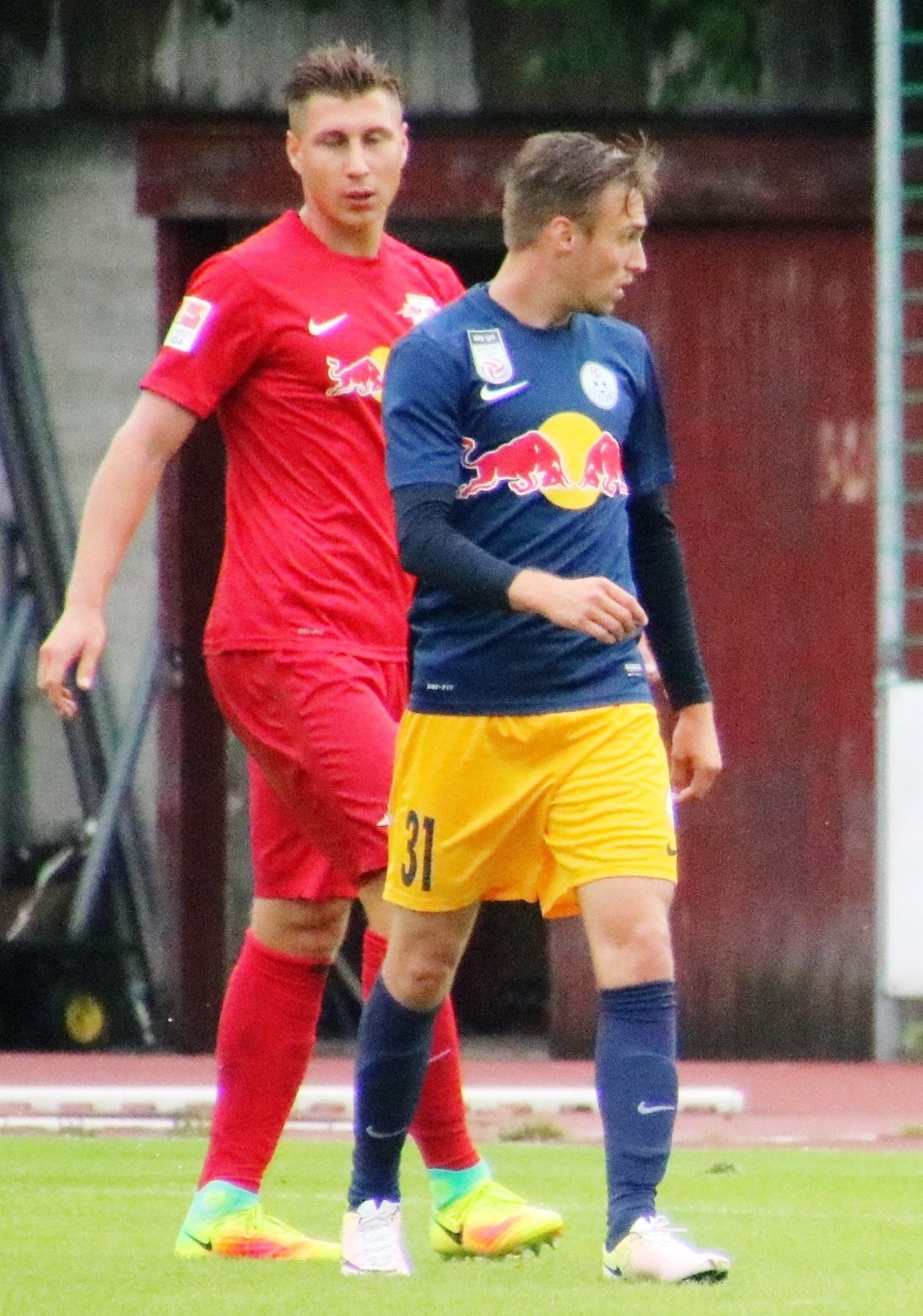
Orbán (left in the red shirt) playing in a friendly match against FC Liefering on 9 August 2016.

In May 2015, Orbán joined league rivals RB Leipzig. The move reported to have cost 2.5 million euros transfer fee. He later said: "I switched mainly because of Ralf Rangnick. He can make any player better."

Orbán made his RB Leipzig debut in the opening game of the season, starting the whole game, in a 1–0 win over FSV Frankfurt. He quickly established himself in the starting eleven for the side, playing in the centre–back position. In mid–September, Orbán was a subject of fault for making two mistakes in the last three matches, leading him to be on probation. Despite this, Orbán continued to remain in the starting eleven for the side. After picking up his fifth yellow card of the season against SV Sandhausen, Orbán missed the contest against his former club, Kaiserslautern, through suspension.

He scored his first goal for Leipzig in a 3–0 victory over Union Berlin on 19 February 2016, and was handed the captain's armband for two matches in March in the absence of regular captain Dominik Kaiser. Orbán was sent off on his first return to the Fritz-Walter-Stadion in Kaiserslautern, after picking up his second yellow card in the 63rd minute. During the match, he received mixed reception from 1. FC Kaiserslautern supporters. Orbán played nearly every minute of Leipzig's successful campaign in the 2. Bundesliga, and as a centre-back, was instrumental in Leipzig's league-leading defense. In his first season at RB Leipzig, Orbán went on to make thirty–three appearances and scoring once in all competitions.

==== 2016–17 season ====
In the 2016–17 season, Orbán continued to remain in the first team for the side, playing in the centre–back position. He was given the vice captaincy for the side ahead of the new season. After Dominik Kaiser was placed on the substitute bench against Hamburg on 17 September 2016, Orbán captained the side for the first time this season, where he set up a goal for Timo Werner, who went on to score twice, as RB Leipzig won 4–0. As a result, Orbán captained the side in the number of matches when Kaiser was not featured in the starting eleven. He then scored his first goal of the season, scoring from a header, which turns out to be a winning goal, in a 3–2 win over Bayer Leverkusen on 18 November 2016. His second goal of the season then came on 17 December 2016, once again scoring from a header, in a 2–0 win over Hertha BSC.

Since the start of the 2016–17 season, Orbán started in every match until he was suspended for one match for picking up five yellow cards this season. After serving a one match ban, he returned to the starting lineup, retaining his captaincy and starting the whole game, in a 3–1 win over 1. FC Köln on 25 February 2017. However, later in the 2016–17 season, Orbán was sidelined, due to suspension, tactical changes and his own injury concern. His performance in the 2016–17 season earned praises from Ralf Rangnick and the German media, Bild and kicker. At the end of the 2016–17 season, Orbán went on to make twenty–nine appearances and scoring three times in all competitions.

==== 2017–18 season ====
Ahead of the 2017–18 season, Diego Demme and Orbán were among two candidates to be given a captain role by Manager Ralph Hasenhüttl, succeeding Kaiser. Orbán was officially named captain of RB Leipzig by manager Ralph Hasenhüttl on 11 August 2017. At the start of the 2017–18 season as captain, Orbán scored his first goal of the season, in a 4–1 win over Freiburg on 27 August 2017. He extended his contract until the summer of 2022 on 13 October 2017. Four days later on 17 October 2017, he scored his first UEFA Champions League goal, in a 3–2 win over Porto. However, Orbán was sent–off in the 13th minute for a professional foul, as Leipzig lost 2–0 against Bayern Munich on 28 October 2017. After serving a one match suspension, he returned to the starting lineup as captain, in a 2–2 draw against Bayer Leverkusen on 18 November 2017.

Orbán scored his third goal of the season on 17 December 2017, in a 3–2 loss against Hertha BSC. He continued to stand out for the side as captain, as he helped the side finish sixth place and qualify for the UEFA Europa League. His leadership as the club's captain earned praise from Manager Ralph Hasenhüttl. Despite missing out eight matches during the 2017–18 season, he went on to make thirty–seven appearances and scoring four times in all competitions.

==== 2018–19 season ====
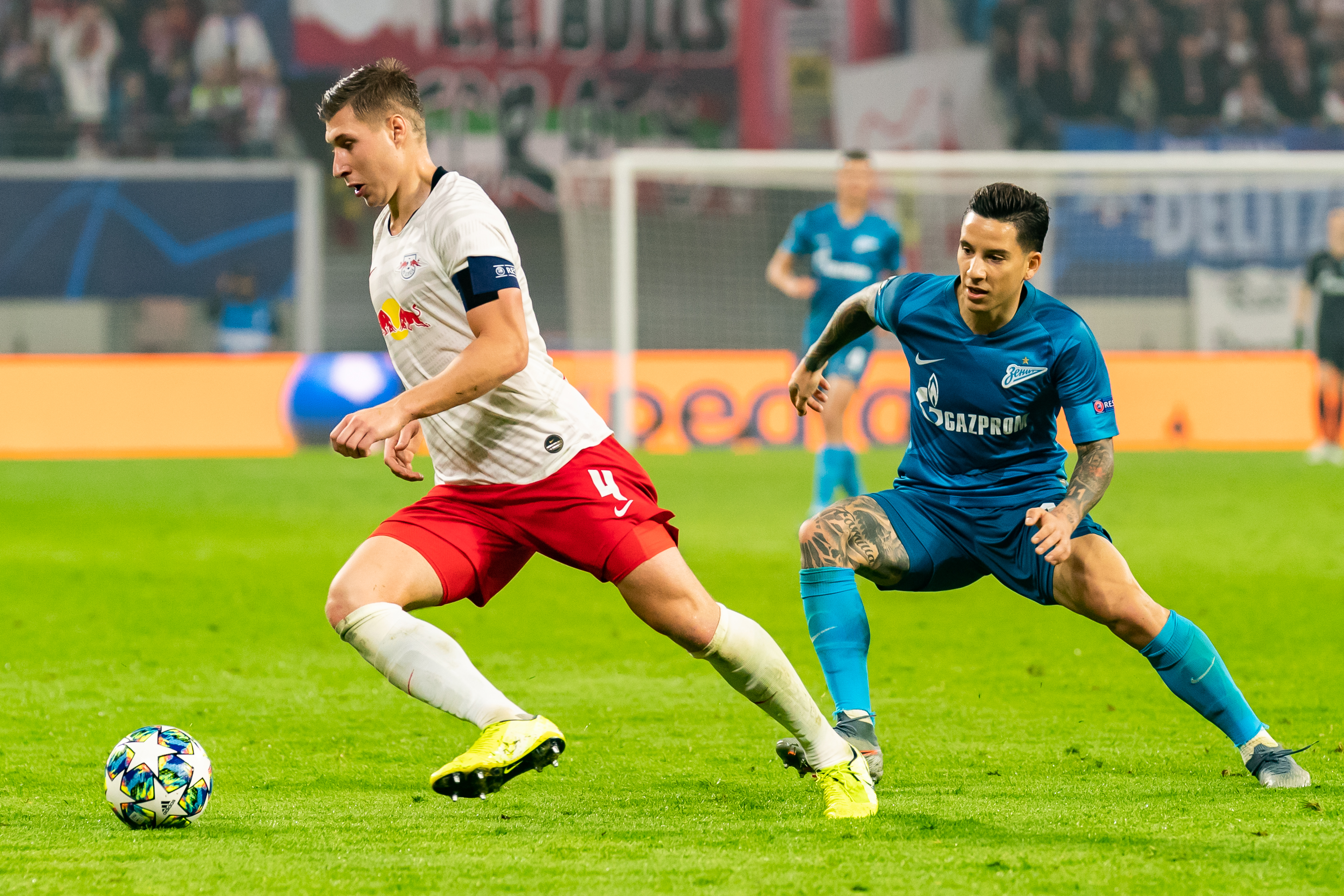
Orbán against Driussi in Champions League

The 2018–19 season saw the returning management of Ralf Rangnick and made a decision to rotate captaincy given to different players. In the end, it was announced that Orban remained as captain for RB Leipzig. He then helped the side qualify for the UEFA Europa League Group Stage after beating the likes of BK Häcken, Universitatea Craiova and Zorya Luhansk. It wasn't until on 26 September 2018 when Orban scored his first goal of the season, in a 2–0 win over VfB Stuttgart. Having initially appeared in the substitute bench at the start of the season, Orban regained his first team place in the centre–back position, along with his captaincy. However, he soon lost his first team place and was demoted to the substitute bench, due to strong competition in the centre–back positions.

By late–January, Orban regained his first team place in the centre–back position once again, along with his captaincy. He then scored twice for the side, in a 3–0 win over Hannover 96 on 1 February 2019. Orban led the club reach their first DFB-Pokal Final after beating Hamburger SV 3–1. In the final against Bayern Munich, Orbán started as captain and played for 70 minutes before being substituted, as RB Leipzig lost 3–0. At the end of the 2018–19 season, Orbán went on to make thirty–nine appearances and scoring four times in all competitions. In the 2019–20 UEFA Champions League, Orbán was part of the team which reached the semi-finals, but eventually lost 3–0 against Paris Saint-Germain. In April 2021, he extended his contract until June 2025. He played in the 2021 DFB-Pokal Final, which RB Leipzig lost 4–1 to Borussia Dortmund. At the end of the 2020–21 season, Orbán was voted "Player of the Season" by the Leipzig fans.

==== 2021–22 season ====
In the 2021–22 Bundesliga season, he made 30 appearances and scored two goals. He scored his first goal in a 2–1 victory over VfL Wolfsburg on 23 January 2022. His second goal was scored in a 1–1 draw against Arminia Bielefeld on 14 May 2022. On 21 May 2022, RB Leipzig won the DFB-Pokal Final against Freiburg, in which Orbán scored in the penalty shootouts which ended in a 4–2 win, to be his club's first title in the competition. In February 2023, he was in doubt to play a Bundesliga match against Union Berlin, as he would donate his stem cells, being registered with the DKMS since 2017, in order to save a patient with blood cancer.

==== 2022–23 season ====
In the 2022–23 Bundesliga season, he made 33 appearances. He scored his first goal in the season in a 2–1 defeat against 1. FC Union Berlin on 20 August 2022. On 10 September 2022, he scored his second goal in a 3–0 win over Borussia Dortmund. In the 2022–23 season, he scored two more goals, one in a 3–2 victory against Hertha BSC on 5 October 2022 and another one in a 2–1 win against SV Werder Bremen on 14 May 2023.

==== 2023–24 season ====
In the 2023–24 Bundesliga season, he made his first appearance in a 3–2 defeat against Bayer 04 Leverkusen on 18 August 2023. His first appearance was followed by to more matches, one against VfB Stuttgart on 25 August 2023, and an away victory (3–0) against 1. FC Union Berlin on 3 September 2023. However, he was injured in a friendly match against Czech Republic. Therefore, he had to miss the remaining matches in 2023.

On 4 January 2024, it was revealed that he would be able to play at the end of January. On 27 January 2024, he returned from his injury in a 5–2 defeat against VfB Stuttgart on the 19th matchday, in which he entered the pitch as a substitute for Mohamed Simakan.

On 6 March 2024, he scored the equalizer in a 1–1 draw against Real Madrid in the 2023–24 UEFA Champions League round of 16 at Santiago Bernabéu Stadium; however, his team was eliminated from the competition by losing 2–1 on aggregate.

==== 2024–25 season ====
On 19 October 2024, he scored his first goal in the 2024–25 Bundesliga season in a 2–0 victory over Mainz at the Mewa Arena, He scored his first goal in the 2024–25 season at the Red Bull Arena in a 3–1 victory over SC Freiburg.

== International career ==
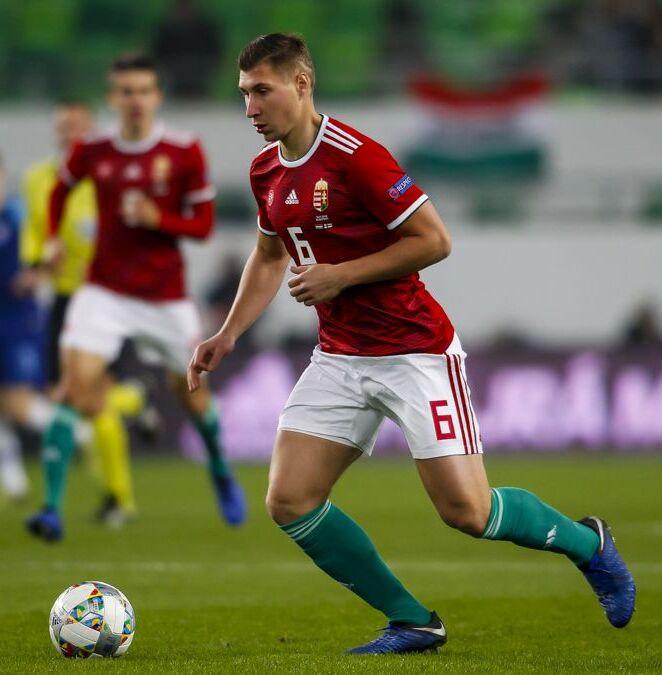
Orbán with Hungary against Finland in 2018

Orbán was born and grew up in Germany to a Hungarian father and a Polish mother, making him eligible for all three national teams: Germany, Hungary and Poland.

Orbán was a youth international for Germany. In November 2009, he was called up to the Germany U18 squad for the first time. However, he never played for the side despite being called up once more. In November 2014, Orbán was called up to the Germany U21 squad for the first time. He made his Germany U21 debut on 13 November 2014, coming on as a late substitute, in a 3–2 win over Netherlands U21. Orbán went on to make two appearances for the U21 side.

In August 2016, the RB Leipzig's sporting director Ralf Rangnick hinted that Orbán could potentially play for the national side. Two months later, he spoke out about the options in an interview with Bild, saying: "All three countries are still an option, Germany as one of the best football nations in the world remains for the time being my first address." His performance at RB Leipzig attracted attention from the German media over calls of including in the squad for the 2017 FIFA Confederations Cup. In response, Orbán made two separate interviews about his choice to play for, declaring his interests to play for the Germany national team. However, Orbán did not make the final cut to the Confederations Cup squad. Despite this, Orbán stated that he had not given up on a call-up to Germany team.

On 1 October 2018, Orbán elected to represent Hungary. The decision came after Hungary initially expressed interest in calling Orbán up to the national team about five months prior. Orbán made his debut in a 1–0 UEFA Nations League loss to Greece on 12 October 2018. On 15 November 2018, he scored his first goal in the national team in a Nations League match against Estonia at the Groupama Aréna. On 8 June 2019, he scored twice in a 3–1 win over Azerbaijan in the UEFA Euro 2020 qualification.

On 8 October 2020, Orbán scored his fourth international goal for Hungary against Bulgaria in a UEFA Euro 2020 qualifying play-off semi-final, as the Magyars won 3–1 in Sofia. On 13 November, he played the full 90 minutes as Hungary beat Iceland in the play-off final to qualify for the 2020 European Championship. On 1 June 2021, Orbán was included in the final 26-man squad to represent Hungary at the rescheduled UEFA Euro 2020 tournament. He played all three of the team's Group F matches at centre back as the Magyars lost to Portugal and drew with both France and Germany. On 7 September 2023, he scored the winning goal in a 2–1 victory against Serbia national football team in the UEFA Euro 2024 qualifying match at the Stadion Rajko Mitic in Belgrade, Serbia. After the match, he was voted the best player against Serbia by the readers of Nemzeti Sport. On 10 September 2023, he suffered a knee injury in a friendly tie against Czech Republic. On 24 October 2023, Philipp Hinze said that Orbán's convalescence was faster than predicted. In an article published on Nemzeti Sport, Zsolt Somogyi said that Orbán cannot be substituted and his absence is a huge problem for the national team. Orbán had to miss the matches between October and November 2023 against Serbia, Lithuania, Bulgaria, and Montenegro. In these four matches, the national team conceded six goals.

On 14 May 2024, Orbán was named in Hungary's squad for UEFA Euro 2024. He started the team's opening match of the tournament against Switzerland, playing the full 90 minutes of the 3–1 loss in Cologne. He went on to start in a 2–0 loss to his birth nation Germany in the second match and a 1–0 win over Scotland in the third match as Hungary finished third in Group A with three points.

== Personal life ==
Orbán was born and grew up in Kaiserslautern, Germany to a Hungarian father and a mother of Polish descent. His parents split up when he was two, leaving his mother to raise him and his sister, Sandra. Speaking of his childhood in 2017, Orbán said: "when I was a kid at home, I shot everything with my football. A few flower vases and bottles, nothing wild, but it was enough that Mama said: The boy has too much energy, we prefer to put it in a football club. Since she has done everything right." He revealed that his father was a karate master in his youth. Because of his Hungarian father, Orbán has a Hungarian passport. Orbán attended Heinrich Heine High School in Kaiserslautern. Outside of football, Orbán is a fan of classical music and plays the violin.

== Career statistics ==
=== Club ===
As of match played 31 October 2026

Appearances and goals by club, season and competition
Club	Season	League			DFB-Pokal		Europe		Other		Total	
Club	Season	Division	Apps	Goals	Apps	Goals	Apps	Goals	Apps	Goals	Apps	Goals
1. FC Kaiserslautern II	2011–12	Regionalliga West	23	3	—		—		—		23	3
1. FC Kaiserslautern II	2012–13	Regionalliga Südwest	12	4	—		—		—		12	4
1. FC Kaiserslautern II	Total		35	7	—		—		—		35	7
1. FC Kaiserslautern	2011–12	Bundesliga	2	0	0	0	—		—		2	0
1. FC Kaiserslautern	2012–13	2. Bundesliga	7	1	0	0	—		2 (Note: Appearances in 2. Bundesliga promotion play-offs)	0	9	1
1. FC Kaiserslautern	2013–14	2. Bundesliga	28	2	4	1	—		—		32	3
1. FC Kaiserslautern	2014–15	2. Bundesliga	31	4	3	0	—		—		34	4
1. FC Kaiserslautern	Total		68	7	7	1	—		2	0	77	8
RB Leipzig	2015–16	2. Bundesliga	32	1	1	0	—		—		33	1
RB Leipzig	2016–17	Bundesliga	28	3	1	0	—		—		29	3
RB Leipzig	2017–18	Bundesliga	26	3	2	0	9 (Note: Six appearances and one goal in UEFA Champions League, three appearances in UEFA Europa League)	1	—		37	4
RB Leipzig	2018–19	Bundesliga	24	4	4	0	11 (Note: Appearances in UEFA Europa League)	0	—		39	4
RB Leipzig	2019–20	Bundesliga	12	1	2	0	4 (Note: Appearances in UEFA Champions League)	0	—		18	1
RB Leipzig	2020–21	Bundesliga	29	4	5	1	6	0	—		40	5
RB Leipzig	2021–22	Bundesliga	30	2	6	1	8 (Note: Four appearances in UEFA Champions League, four appearances and one goal in UEFA Europa League)	1	—		44	4
RB Leipzig	2022–23	Bundesliga	33	4	6	1	8	0	1 (Note: Appearance in DFL-Supercup)	0	48	5
RB Leipzig	2023–24	Bundesliga	19	0	0	0	2	1	1	0	22	1
RB Leipzig	2024–25	Bundesliga	25	5	5	0	8	0	—		38	5
RB Leipzig	2025–26	Bundesliga	33	2	4	1	—		—		37	3
RB Leipzig	2026–27	Bundesliga	8	1	2	1	3	0	—		13	2
RB Leipzig	Total		299	30	38	5	59	3	2	0	398	38
Career total			402	45	44	6	59	3	4	0	509	54

=== International ===
As of match played 5 October 2026

Appearances and goals by national team and year
National team	Year	Apps	Goals
Hungary	2018	4	1
Hungary	2019	8	2
Hungary	2020	6	1
Hungary	2021	10	1
Hungary	2022	9	0
Hungary	2023	6	1
Hungary	2024	11	0
Hungary	2025	10	0
Hungary	2026	8	0
Total		72	6

Scores and results list Hungary's goal tally first.

List of international goals scored by Willi Orbán
No.	Date	Venue	Opponent	Score	Result	Competition
1.	15 November 2018	Groupama Arena, Budapest, Hungary	Estonia	1–0	2–0	2018–19 UEFA Nations League C
2.	8 June 2019	Bakcell Arena, Baku, Azerbaijan	Azerbaijan	1–0	3–1	UEFA Euro 2020 qualification
3.	8 June 2019	Bakcell Arena, Baku, Azerbaijan	Azerbaijan	2–0	3–1	UEFA Euro 2020 qualification
4.	8 October 2020	Vasil Levski National Stadium, Sofia, Bulgaria	Bulgaria	1–0	3–1	UEFA Euro 2020 qualification play-offs
5.	25 March 2021	Puskás Aréna, Budapest, Hungary	Poland	3–2	3–3	2022 FIFA World Cup qualification
6.	7 September 2023	Red Star Stadium, Belgrade, Serbia	Serbia	2–1	2–1	UEFA Euro 2024 qualification

== Honours ==
RB Leipzig

- DFB-Pokal: 2021–22, 2022–23
- DFL-Supercup: 2023

Individual

- kicker Bundesliga Team of the Season: 2018–19, 2020–21
