= Dominique Heintz =

German footballer

Personal information
- Date of birth: 15 August 1993 (age 33)
- Place of birth: Neustadt an der Weinstraße, Germany
- Height: 1.88 m (6 ft 2 in)
- Position: Centre back

Team information
- Current team: Fortuna Düsseldorf
- Number: 3

Youth career
- SV Herta Kirrweiler
- 2001–2011: 1. FC Kaiserslautern

Senior career*
Years	Team	Apps	(Gls)
2011–2015	1. FC Kaiserslautern II	13	(0)
2011–2015	1. FC Kaiserslautern	64	(0)
2015–2018	1. FC Köln	96	(3)
2018–2022	SC Freiburg	83	(1)
2022–2023	Union Berlin	7	(0)
2022–2023	→ VfL Bochum (loan)	11	(0)
2023–2026	1. FC Köln	49	(0)
2026–	Fortuna Düsseldorf	0	(0)

International career
2010–2011	Germany U18	6	(0)
2011–2012	Germany U19	10	(2)
2012–2013	Germany U20	2	(0)
2014–2015	Germany U21	8	(1)
- * Club domestic league appearances and goals as of 10 May 2026

Dominique Heintz (born 15 August 1993) is a German professional footballer who plays as a centre back for 3. Liga club Fortuna Düsseldorf.

== Career ==
On 28 April 2018, Heintz played as Köln lost 3–2 to SC Freiburg which confirmed the club's relegation from the Bundesliga.

In May 2018, SC Freiburg announced Heintz would join the club for the 2018–19 season. The transfer fee paid to Köln was reported as €3 million.

On 21 December 2021, it was announced that Heintz would join Union Berlin in January 2022 when the transfer window opened.

On 31 August 2023, Heintz returned to Köln on a one-year contract.

On 19 June 2026, Heintz signed a two-season contract with Fortuna Düsseldorf in 3. Liga.

== Career statistics ==
As of match played 10 May 2026

Appearances and goals by club, season and competition
Club	Season	League			DFB-Pokal		Europe		Other		Total	
Club	Season	Division	Apps	Goals	Apps	Goals	Apps	Goals	Apps	Goals	Apps	Goals
Kaiserslautern II	2011–12	Regionalliga West	11	0	—		—		—		11	0
Kaiserslautern II	2013–14	Regionalliga Südwest	1	0	—		—		—		1	0
Kaiserslautern II	2014–15	Regionalliga Südwest	1	0	—		—		—		1	0
Kaiserslautern II	Total		13	0	—		—		—		13	0
Kaiserslautern	2011–12	Bundesliga	1	0	0	0	—		—		1	0
Kaiserslautern	2012–13	2. Bundesliga	28	0	1	0	—		1 (Note: Appearance in relegation play-offs)	0	30	0
Kaiserslautern	2013–14	2. Bundesliga	10	0	4	0	—		—		14	0
Kaiserslautern	2014–15	2. Bundesliga	25	0	1	0	—		—		26	0
Kaiserslautern	Total		64	0	6	0	—		1	0	71	0
Köln	2015–16	Bundesliga	33	2	2	0	—		—		35	2
Köln	2016–17	Bundesliga	32	0	3	0	—		—		35	0
Köln	2017–18	Bundesliga	31	1	3	0	4 (Note: Appearances in UEFA Europa League)	0	—		38	1
Köln	Total		96	3	8	0	4	0	—		108	3
SC Freiburg	2018–19	Bundesliga	34	1	2	0	0	0	—		36	1
SC Freiburg	2019–20	Bundesliga	28	0	2	0	0	0	0	0	30	0
SC Freiburg	2020–21	Bundesliga	21	0	2	0	0	0	—		23	0
SC Freiburg	2021–22	Bundesliga	1	0	0	0	0	0	—		1	0
SC Freiburg	Total		84	1	6	0	0	0	0	0	90	1
Union Berlin	2021–22	Bundesliga	7	0	1	0	—		—		8	0
Union Berlin	2022–23	Bundesliga	0	0	1	0	0	0	0	0	1	0
Union Berlin	2023–24	Bundesliga	0	0	0	0	0	0	—		0	0
Union Berlin	Total		7	0	2	0	0	0	0	0	9	0
Bochum (loan)	2022–23	Bundesliga	11	0	1	0	—		—		12	0
Köln	2023–24	Bundesliga	12	0	0	0	—		—		12	0
Köln	2024–25	2. Bundesliga	28	0	4	0	—		0	0	32	0
Köln	2025–26	Bundesliga	9	0	0	0	—		—		9	0
Köln	Total		49	0	4	0	—		0	0	53	0
Career total			324	4	27	0	4	0	1	0	356	4

== Honours ==
1.FC Koln

- 2. Bundesliga: 2024–25
