= Leon Jessen =

Danish footballer (born 1986)

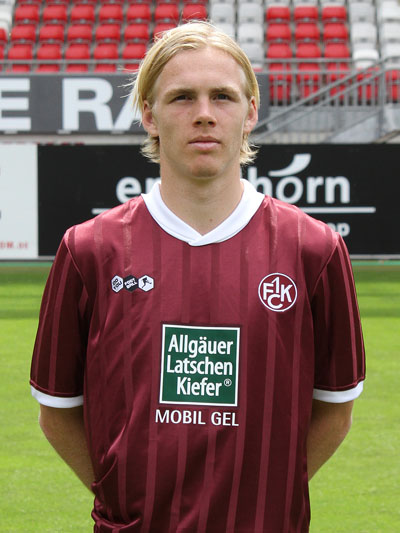

Personal information
- Full name: Leon Jessen
- Date of birth: 11 June 1986 (age 40)
- Place of birth: Brande, Denmark
- Height: 1.82 m (6 ft 0 in)
- Position: Left back

Youth career
- 2001–2003: Brande IF
- 2003–2005: Ikast FS

Senior career*
Years	Team	Apps	(Gls)
2005–2010	Midtjylland	99	(3)
2010–2015	1. FC Kaiserslautern	54	(1)
2013–2015	→ FC Ingolstadt 04 (loan)	14	(0)
2015–2016	Esbjerg fB	33	(0)

International career
2004–2005	Denmark U-19	7	(0)
2006–2008	Denmark U-21	7	(0)
2006	Denmark U-20	1	(0)
2009–2010	Denmark	4	(0)
- * Club domestic league appearances and goals

Leon Jessen (born 11 June 1986) is a Danish former footballer who played as a defender.

== Career ==
Jessen began his career in 2001 with Brande IF and joined Ikast FS in 2003. On 23 June 2010, Jessen left the Danish Superliga side FC Midtjylland after five years and signed with 1. FC Kaiserslautern in Germany (Bundesliga).

On 10 July 2015, it was confirmed that Jessen had signed a three-year contract with Danish Superliga-side Esbjerg fB.

It was announced on 31 December 2016 that Jessen would retire.
