= Steven Zellner =

German footballer

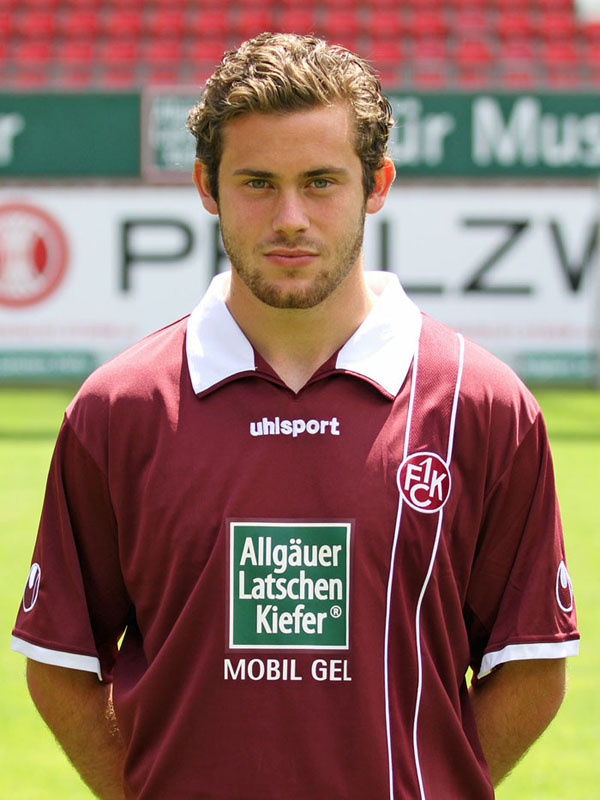
- Zellner in 2011

Personal information
- Date of birth: 14 March 1991 (age 35)
- Place of birth: Wadern, Germany
- Height: 1.85 m (6 ft 1 in)
- Position: Midfielder

Youth career
- –2006: VfL Primstal
- 2006–2009: 1. FC Kaiserslautern

Senior career*
Years	Team	Apps	(Gls)
2009–2015	1. FC Kaiserslautern II	91	(9)
2012–2015	1. FC Kaiserslautern	12	(0)
2015–2017	SV Sandhausen	10	(0)
2017–2023	1. FC Saarbrücken	145	(10)

International career
	Germany U17	12	(3)
	Germany U18	1	(1)
2011–2012	Germany U20	3	(0)
- * Club domestic league appearances and goals

Steven Zellner (born 14 March 1991) is a German former professional footballer who played as a midfielder.

== Club career ==
Zellner was born in Wadern. He made his Bundesliga debut on 11 February 2012 in a 2–0 loss away to FC Bayern Munich.

On 2 February 2015, it was announced that Zellner had moved to fellow 2. Bundesliga club SV Sandhausen. He signed a contract for the remainder of the 2014–15 season including an extension clause.
