= Denis Linsmayer =

German footballer

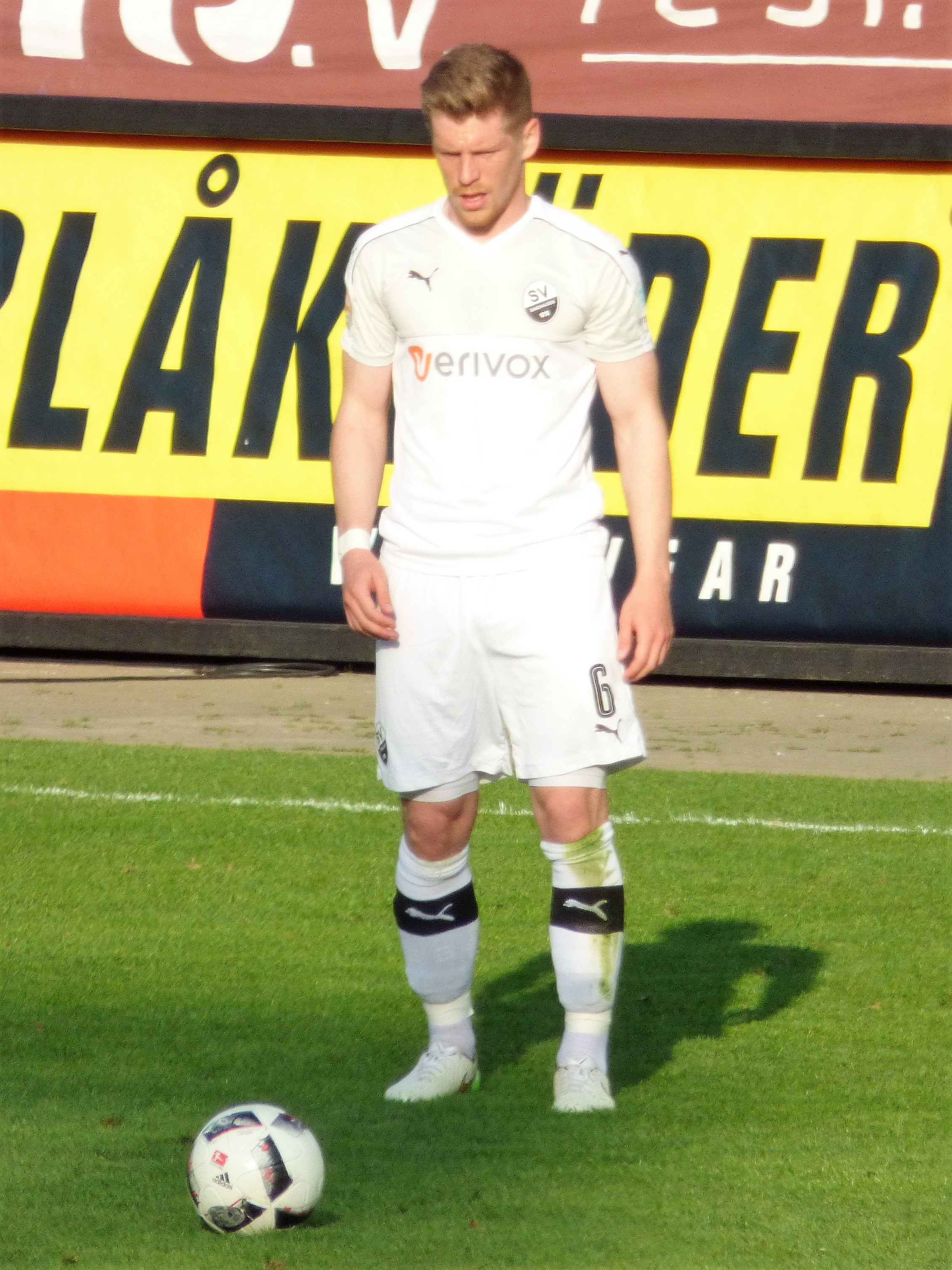
- Linsmayer with SV Sandhausen in 2017

Personal information
- Date of birth: 19 September 1991 (age 35)
- Place of birth: Pirmasens, Germany
- Height: 1.83 m (6 ft 0 in)
- Position: Defensive midfielder

Team information
- Current team: 1. FC Kaiserslautern II
- Number: 6

Youth career
- –2004: TSG Kaiserslautern
- 2004–2010: 1. FC Kaiserslautern

Senior career*
Years	Team	Apps	(Gls)
2010–2013	1. FC Kaiserslautern II	88	(2)
2012	1. FC Kaiserslautern	8	(0)
2013–2021	SV Sandhausen	241	(9)
2021–2023	FC Ingolstadt	46	(1)
2023–2026	Mainz II	70	(1)
2026–	1. FC Kaiserslautern II	8	(0)
- * Club domestic league appearances and goals as of 24 September 2026

Denis Linsmayer (born 19 September 1991) is a German professional footballer who plays as a defensive midfielder for 1. FC Kaiserslautern II.

== Career ==
Linsmayer began his career with 1. FC Kaiserslautern made his debut for the club in August 2012, as a substitute for Albert Bunjaku in a 2. Bundesliga match against Dynamo Dresden.

On 26 June 2023, Linsmayer agreed to join Mainz II in Regionalliga.
