= Albert Bunjaku =

Kosovar footballer (born 1983)

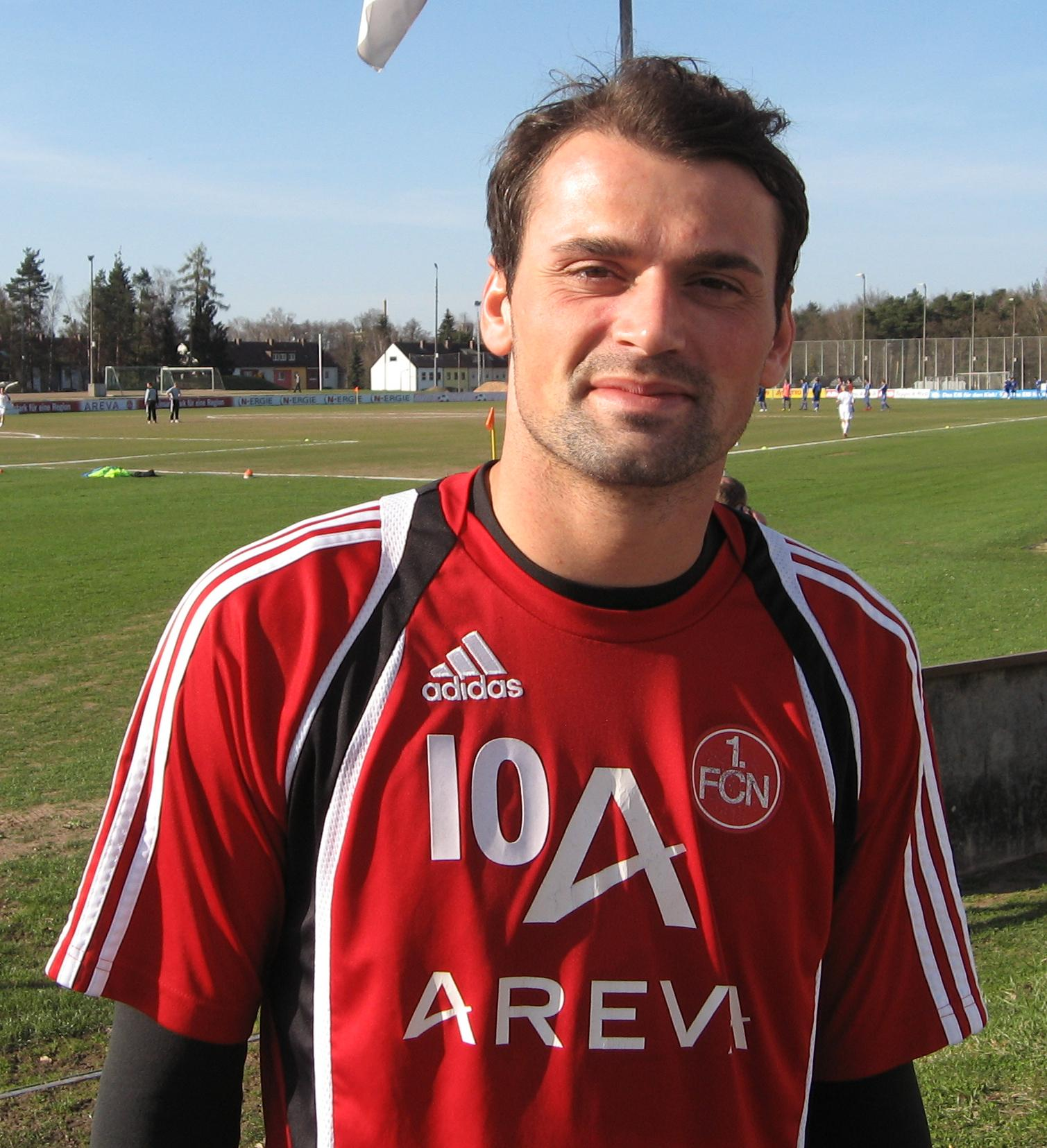
- Bunjaku at practice with 1. FC Nürnberg in 2010

Personal information
- Date of birth: 29 November 1983 (age 42)
- Place of birth: Gjilan, SFR Yugoslavia
- Height: 1.80 m (5 ft 11 in)
- Position: Striker

Team information
- Current team: Bayer Leverkusen Youth (assistant); Kosovo U19 (manager)

Youth career
- 1996–1998: FC Schlieren
- 1998–2000: Grasshoppers
- 2000–2003: Young Fellows Juventus

Senior career*
Years	Team	Apps	(Gls)
2003–2005	Schaffhausen	39	(3)
2006	SC Paderborn	10	(1)
2006–2009	Rot-Weiß Erfurt	74	(34)
2009–2012	1. FC Nürnberg	55	(14)
2011	→ 1. FC Nürnberg II	4	(2)
2012–2014	1. FC Kaiserslautern	31	(13)
2014–2017	St. Gallen	51	(9)
2017–2018	Erzgebirge Aue	23	(1)
2018–2022	Viktoria Köln	89	(34)
2022	Bonner SC	11	(1)
Total		383	(110)

International career
2004–2006	Switzerland U21	15	(7)
2009–2010	Switzerland	6	(0)
2014–2016	Kosovo	6	(3)

Managerial career
- 2022–2023: Bonner SC (assistant)
- 2023: Bonner SC (caretaker)
- 2023–: Bayer Leverkusen Youth (assistant)
- 2025–: Kosovo U19
- * Club domestic league appearances and goals

Albert Bunjaku (born 29 November 1983) is a Kosovan professional football coach and former player who is the assistant manager of the youth team at Bundesliga club Bayer Leverkusen and the manager of the Kosovo national under-19 team.

== Club career ==
When Bunjaku was eight years old, he moved with his mother and two brothers to Switzerland, where his father was already working. Bunjaku joined his first club at 13 – unusually late for a future professional. Before starting out with FC Schlieren, he only played football in the schoolyard or on the five-a-side court. At that stage he was also very keen on basketball.

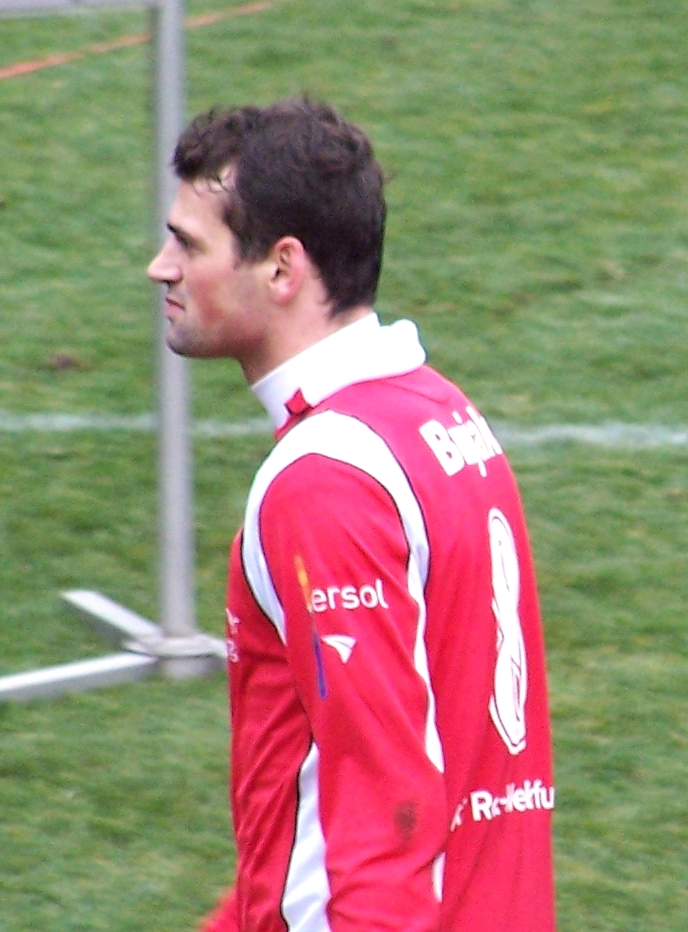
Bunjaku playing for Rot-Weiß Erfurt

Bunjaku's first step on the professional ladder was at FC Schaffhausen in the Challenge League, Switzerland's second division. The team won promotion to the Super League in 2003–04 and over the course of the next 18 months the young forward made 39 top-flight appearances.

In January 2006, the 23-year-old Bunjaku left Schaffhausen for 2. Bundesliga side SC Paderborn. His first staging post in Germany was destined to last just six months however, as he failed to establish himself under then-coach Jos Luhukay. "At the time I didn't have the feeling he was Bundesliga material", Luhukay says now. As a result, Bunjaku found himself unemployed in the summer of 2006.

Then however, a chance conversation turned Bunjaku's fortunes around. His wife Arieta worked in a boutique in Paderborn frequented by the wife of former Paderborn coach Pavel Dochev. They struck up a conversation and it transpired that Dotchev, now in charge of Rot-Weiß Erfurt, was on the lookout for a striker. No sooner said than done, and Bunjaku was on the move to third-division Erfurt.

He first came to the attention of the wider footballing public when Rot-Weiß Erfurt took on Bayern Munich in a DFB Cup tie on 10 August 2008. Coming on as a second-half substitute in what was Jürgen Klinsmann's competitive debut as Bayern coach, Bunjaku put two goals past the record champions, who eventually squeezed past their lower-league opponents 4–3.

Bunjaku retired in May 2022.

== International career ==
On 14 November 2009, Bunjaku made his international debut for Switzerland in the 1–0 home loss to Norway in a friendly match after coming on as a substitute for Alexander Frei at half time. He was part of the Swiss squad for the 2010 FIFA World Cup, playing the last 13 minutes of the group match against Chile after coming on for Gelson Fernandes. Bunjaku played in Kosovo's first FIFA-approved match, against Haiti in a 0–0 home friendly on 5 March 2014. Bunjaku played for Kosovo against Turkey on 21 May 2014 and scored its first international goal.

=== International goals ===
As of match played 3 June 2016
Scores and results list Kosovo's goal tally first, score column indicates score after each Bunjaku goal.

List of international goals scored by Albert Bunjaku
No.	Date	Venue	Cap	Opponent	Score	Result	Competition
1	21 May 2014	Adem Jashari Olympic Stadium, Mitrovica, Kosovo	2	Turkey	1–2	1–6	Friendly
2	25 May 2014	Stade de Genève, Genève, Switzerland	3	Senegal	1–1	1–3	Friendly
3	3 June 2016	Stadion am Bornheimer Hang, Frankfurt, Germany	4	Faroe Islands	1–0	2–0	Friendly
