= Florian Dick =

German footballer

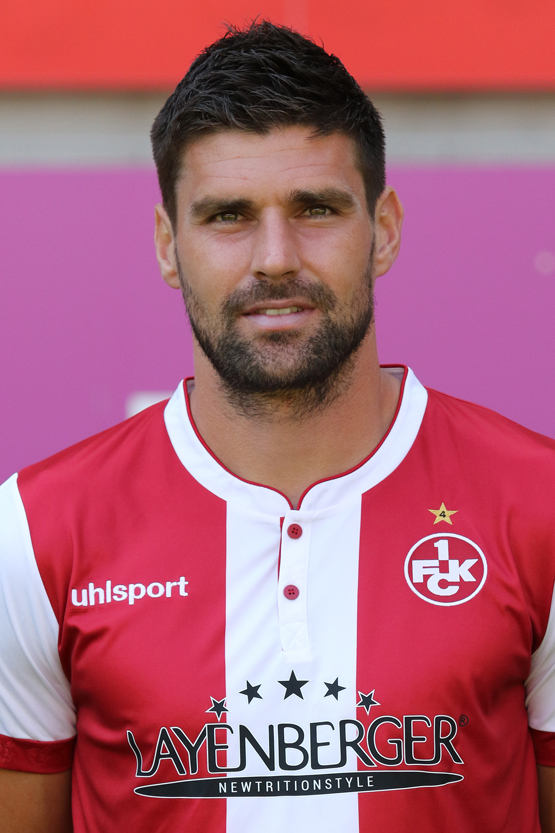

Personal information
- Date of birth: 9 November 1984 (age 41)
- Place of birth: Bruchsal, West Germany
- Height: 1.83 m (6 ft 0 in)
- Position: Defender

Youth career
- –1993: FV Hambrücken
- 1993–2003: Karlsruher SC

Senior career*
Years	Team	Apps	(Gls)
2002–2008	Karlsruher SC II	61	(5)
2003–2008	Karlsruher SC	85	(1)
2008–2014	1. FC Kaiserslautern	187	(10)
2014–2018	Arminia Bielefeld	103	(4)
2018–2019	1. FC Kaiserslautern	11	(0)

International career
2003–2004	Germany U20	4	(0)
- * Club domestic league appearances and goals as of 22:23, 1 August 2019 (UTC)

Florian Dick (born 9 November 1984) is a German former professional footballer who played as a defender.

Dick is a youth international for Germany at U20 level.
