= 2021–22 1. FC Union Berlin season =

Union Berlin
2021–22 season
- Chairman: Dirk Zingler
- Manager: Urs Fischer
- Stadium: Stadion An der Alten Försterei
- Bundesliga: 5th
- DFB-Pokal: Semi-finals
- UEFA Europa Conference League: Group stage
- Top goalscorer: League: Taiwo Awoniyi (15); All: Taiwo Awoniyi (20)
Home colours	Away colours	Third colours

The 2021–22 season was 1. FC Union Berlin's 57th season in existence and the club's 3rd consecutive season in the Bundesliga, the top tier of German football. The club participated in the DFB-Pokal and the UEFA Europa Conference League.

== Players ==
=== Squad ===
As of 22 February 2022

Note: Flags indicate national team as defined under FIFA eligibility rules; some limited exceptions apply. Players may hold more than one non-FIFA nationality.

No.	Pos.	Nation	Player
1	GK	GER	Andreas Luthe
3	DF	GER	Paul Jaeckel
6	MF	NOR	Julian Ryerson
7	MF	GER	Levin Öztunalı
8	MF	GER	Rani Khedira
9	FW	GER	Andreas Voglsammer
10	FW	GER	Sven Michel
11	FW	NGR	Anthony Ujah
12	GK	DEN	Jakob Busk
13	MF	HUN	András Schäfer
14	FW	NGR	Taiwo Awoniyi
17	FW	GER	Kevin Behrens
18	MF	JPN	Keita Endo
19	GK	DEN	Frederik Rønnow

No.	Pos.	Nation	Player
20	DF	GER	Bastian Oczipka
21	MF	GER	Grischa Prömel (vice-captain)
23	DF	GER	Niko Gießelmann
24	MF	JPN	Genki Haraguchi
25	DF	GER	Timo Baumgartl (on loan from PSV)
27	FW	SUR	Sheraldo Becker
28	DF	AUT	Christopher Trimmel (captain)
29	MF	GER	Laurenz Dehl
30	MF	GER	Kevin Möhwald
31	DF	GER	Robin Knoche
33	DF	GER	Dominique Heintz
37	DF	GER	Mathis Bruns
39	FW	NGR	Suleiman Abdullahi

=== Out on loan ===
Note: Flags indicate national team as defined under FIFA eligibility rules; some limited exceptions apply. Players may hold more than one non-FIFA nationality.

No.	Pos.	Nation	Player
4	DF	NED	Rick van Drongelen (on loan to (Belgium) Mechelen until 30 June 2022)
15	MF	POL	Paweł Wszołek (on loan to (Poland) Legia Warszawa until 30 June 2022)
26	DF	POL	Tymoteusz Puchacz (on loan to (Turkey) Trabzonspor until 30 June 2022)
32	FW	DEN	Marcus Ingvartsen (on loan to (Germany) Mainz 05 until 30 June 2022)

No.	Pos.	Nation	Player
38	FW	GER	Leon Dajaku (on loan to (England) Sunderland until 30 June 2022)
—	GK	GER	Lennart Moser (on loan to Austria Klagenfurt until 30 June 2022)
—	MF	GER	Fabio Schneider (on loan to (Finland) Kuopion Palloseura until 30 June 2022)
—	MF	GER	Tim Maciejewski (on loan to Austria Klagenfurt until 30 June 2022)

== Background ==
After finishing the 2019–20 season, their first in the Bundesliga, in 11th-place, Union started the 2020–21 season strongly and were in fifth-place and one point behind third-place after 16 matches. Union picked up just seven points from their next 8 matches before a return to fitness for Max Kruse saw an upturn in the club's form as they secured a seventh-placed finish and qualification to the 2021–22 UEFA Europa Conference League after Kruse scored a stoppage time winner in a final day victory over RB Leipzig.

== Friendly matches ==
Pre-season match details
Date	Time	Opponent	Venue	Result F–A	Scorers	Attendance	Ref.
14 July 2021	17:30	Viktoria Berlin	Away	5–2	Behrens 4', Ingvartsen 56', Baumgartl 67', Voglsammer 80', 85'	1,179	
17 July 2021	14:05	Dynamo Dresden	Home	3–0	Ingvartsen 37', Voglsammer 45', Knoche 54'	3,278	
23 July 2021	17:00	Dynamo Kyiv	Home	1–1	Zabarnyi 37' o.g.		
6 October 2021	17:30	St. Gallen	Home	1–3	Jaeckel 69'		

== Competitions ==
=== Bundesliga ===
==== League table ====
Pos	Team	Pld	W	D	L	GF	GA	GD	Pts	Qualification or relegation
3	Bayer Leverkusen	34	19	7	8	80	47	+33	64	Qualification for the Champions League group stage
4	RB Leipzig	34	17	7	10	72	37	+35	58	Qualification for the Champions League group stage
5	Union Berlin	34	16	9	9	50	44	+6	57	Qualification for the Europa League group stage (Note: Since the 2021–22 DFB-Pokal winners, RB Leipzig, qualified for the Champions League based on league position, the Europa League group stage spot was passed to the sixth-placed team, and the Europa Conference League play-off round spot was passed to the seventh-placed team.)
6	SC Freiburg	34	15	10	9	58	46	+12	55	Qualification for the Europa League group stage
7	1. FC Köln	34	14	10	10	52	49	+3	52	Qualification for the Europa Conference League play-off round

Source: DFB
Rules for classification: 1) Points; 2) Goal difference; 3) Goals scored; 4) Head-to-head results; 5) Head-to-head away goals scored; 6) Away goals scored; 7) Play-off.

==== Results summary ====
Overall								Home						Away					
Pld	W	D	L	GF	GA	GD	Pts	W	D	L	GF	GA	GD	W	D	L	GF	GA	GD
34	16	9	9	50	44	+6	57	10	5	2	25	17	+8	6	4	7	25	27	−2

Source: DFB

==== Results by matchday ====
Matchday	1	2	3	4	5	6	7	8	9	10	11	12	13	14	15	16	17	18	19	20	21	22	23	24	25	26	27	28	29	30	31	32	33	34
Ground	H	A	H	H	A	H	A	H	A	H	A	H	A	H	A	H	A	A	H	A	A	H	A	H	A	H	A	H	A	H	A	H	A	H
Result	D	D	W	D	L	W	W	W	D	L	D	W	L	W	L	D	W	D	W	W	L	L	L	W	L	D	L	W	W	W	W	D	W	W
Position	7	12	8	8	8	7	7	5	5	6	6	5	6	5	6	8	7	7	5	4	5	8	9	7	7	8	9	7	7	6	6	7	6	5

Source: DFB
A = Away; H = Home; W = Win; D = Draw; L = Loss

==== Matches ====
The league fixtures were announced on 25 June.

Date	Time	Opponent	Venue	Result F–A	Scorers	Attendance	Referee	Ref.
14 August 2021	15:30	Bayer Leverkusen	Home	1–1	Awoniyi 7'	11,000	Tobias Reichel	
22 August 2021	15:30	1899 Hoffenheim	Away	2–2	Gießelmann 10', Awoniyi 47'	8,014	Sascha Stegemann	
29 August 2021	15:30	Borussia Mönchengladbach	Home	2–1	Gießelmann 22', Awoniyi 41'	11,006	Felix Brych	
11 September 2021	15:30	FC Augsburg	Home	0–0		10,207	Martin Petersen	
19 September 2021	17:30	Borussia Dortmund	Away	2–4	Kruse 57', Voglsammer 81'	25,000	Sven Jablonski	
25 September 2021	15:30	Arminia Bielefeld	Home	1–0	Behrens 88'	11,000	Marco Fritz	
3 October 2021	15:30	Mainz 05	Away	2–1	Awoniyi 69', 73'	16,000	Tobias Stieler	
16 October 2021	15:30	VfL Wolfsburg	Home	2–0	Awoniyi 49', Becker 82'	10,978	Sascha Stegemann	
24 October 2021	17:30	VfB Stuttgart	Away	1–1	Awoniyi 31'	32,535	Florian Badstübner	
30 October 2021	15:30	Bayern Munich	Home	2–5	Gießelmann 43', Ryerson 65'	16,509	Harm Osmers	
7 November 2021	17:30	1. FC Köln	Away	2–2	Ryerson 9', Prömel 45+1'	49,000	Daniel Siebert	
20 November 2021	18:30	Hertha BSC	Home	2–0	Awoniyi 8', Trimmel 30'	22,012	Felix Brych	
28 November 2021	15:30	Eintracht Frankfurt	Away	1–2	Kruse 62'	24,000	Sascha Stegemann	
3 December 2021	20:30	RB Leipzig	Home	2–1	Awoniyi 6', Baumgartl 57'	13,506	Harm Osmers	
12 December 2021	15:30	Greuther Fürth	Away	0–1		0	Sven Jablonski	
15 December 2021	20:30	SC Freiburg	Home	0–0		5,000	Deniz Aytekin	
18 December 2021	15:30	VfL Bochum	Away	1–0	Kruse 16'	13,500	Tobias Reichel	
8 January 2022	15:30	Bayer Leverkusen	Away	2–2	Prömel 45', 50'	0	Matthias Jöllenbeck	
15 January 2022	15:30	1899 Hoffenheim	Home	2–1	Voglsammer 22', Prömel 73'	3,000	Martin Petersen	
22 January 2022	15:30	Borussia Mönchengladbach	Away	2–1	Kruse 18' (pen.), 84'	750	Felix Brych	
5 February 2022	15:30	FC Augsburg	Away	0–2		7,600	Harm Osmers	
13 February 2022	15:30	Borussia Dortmund	Home	0–3		10,000	Matthias Jöllenbeck	
19 February 2022	15:30	Arminia Bielefeld	Away	0–1		10,000	Daniel Schlager	
26 February 2022	15:30	Mainz 05	Home	3–1	Haraguchi 8', Becker 56', Awoniyi 75'	10,000	Bastian Dankert	
5 March 2022	15:30	VfL Wolfsburg	Away	0–1		15,703	Patrick Ittrich	
12 March 2022	15:30	VfB Stuttgart	Home	1–1	Awoniyi 41' (pen.)	16,509	Robert Hartmann	
19 March 2022	18:30	Bayern Munich	Away	0–4		37,000	Harm Osmers	
1 April 2022	20:30	1. FC Köln	Home	1–0	Awoniyi 49'	22,012	Florian Badstübner	
9 April 2022	18:30	Hertha BSC	Away	4–1	Haraguchi 31', Prömel 53', Becker 74', Michel 85'	74,667	Sven Jablonski	
17 April 2022	17:30	Eintracht Frankfurt	Home	2–0	Awoniyi 17', Prömel 21'	22,000	Frank Willenborg	
23 April 2022	15:30	RB Leipzig	Away	2–1	Michel 86', Behrens 89'	45,770	Daniel Schlager	
29 April 2022	20:30	Greuther Fürth	Home	1–1	Michel 72'	22,012	Patrick Ittrich	
7 May 2022	15:30	SC Freiburg	Away	4–1	Prömel 11', Trimmel 30', Becker 41', Schäfer 90'	34,700	Felix Brych	
14 May 2022	15:30	VfL Bochum	Home	3–2	Prömel 5', Awoniyi 25' (pen.), 88'	22,012	Marco Fritz	

=== DFB-Pokal ===
Round	Date	Time	Opponent	Venue	Result F–A	Scorers	Attendance	Referee	Ref.
First round	8 August 2021	15:30	Türkgücü München	Away	1–0	Kruse 23'	3,500	Martin Petersen	
Second round	26 October 2021	18:30	Waldhof Mannheim	Away	3–1 (a.e.t.)	Behrens 18', 118', Awoniyi 94'	14,651	Benjamin Brand	
Round of 16	19 January 2022	20:45	Hertha BSC	Away	3–2	Voglsammer 11', Stark 50', Knoche 55'	3,000	Deniz Aytekin	
Quarter-finals	1 March 2022	20:45	FC St. Pauli	Home	2–1	Becker 45', Voglsammer 75'	10,000	Florian Badstübner	
Semi-finals	20 April 2022	20:45	RB Leipzig	Away	1–2	Becker 25'	47,069	Felix Brych	

=== Europa Conference League ===
Round	Date	Time	Opponent	Venue	Result F–A	Scorers	Attendance	Referee	Ref.
Play-off round	19 August 2021	18:00	Kuopion Palloseura	Away	4–0	Awoniyi 6', 31', Kruse 29', Voglsammer 90+2'	5,632	Ivan Bebek	
Play-off round	26 August 2021	20:30	Kuopion Palloseura	Home	0–0		22,159	Halil Umut Meler	

==== Group stage ====
Pos	Team	Pld	W	D	L	GF	GA	GD	Pts	Qualification	FEY	SLA	UNI	MHA
1	(Netherlands) Feyenoord	6	4	2	0	11	6	+5	14	Advance to round of 16	—	2–1	3–1	2–1
2	(Czech Republic) Slavia Prague	6	2	2	2	8	7	+1	8	Advance to knockout round play-offs	2–2	—	3–1	1–0
3	(Germany) Union Berlin	6	2	1	3	8	9	−1	7		1–2	1–1	—	3–0
4	(Israel) Maccabi Haifa	6	1	1	4	2	7	−5	4		0–0	1–0	0–1	—

Source: UEFA
Legend: Blue = home team win; Yellow = draw; Red = away team win.
Rules for classification: Group stage tiebreakers

Date	Time	Opponent	Venue	Result F–A	Scorers	Attendance	Referee	Ref.
16 September 2021	18:45	Slavia Prague	Away	1–3	Behrens 70'	15,286	Fábio Veríssimo	
30 September 2021	21:00	Maccabi Haifa	Home	3–0	Voglsammer 33', Behrens 48', Awoniyi 76'	23,342	Nick Walsh	
21 October 2021	18:45	Feyenoord	Away	1–3	Awoniyi 35'	46,100	Giorgi Kruashvili	
4 November 2021	21:00	Feyenoord	Home	1–2	Trimmel 41'	30,000	Daniel Stefański	
25 November 2021	18:45 (Note: 19:45 Israel Standard Time)	Maccabi Haifa	Away	1–0	Ryerson 66'	22,150	Michal Ocenáš	
9 December 2021	21:00	Slavia Prague	Home	1–1	Kruse 64'	4,380	Rade Obrenović	

== Transfers ==
=== In ===
Date	Pos	Player	From	Fee	Ref.
30 April 2021	MF	Keita Endo (JPN)	Yokohama F. Marinos (JPN)	Undisclosed	
1 June 2021	MF	Julius Kade (GER)	Dynamo Dresden	€500,000	
15 June 2021	DF	Rick van Drongelen (NED)	Hamburger SV	€500,000	
1 July 2021	FW	Kevin Behrens (GER)	SV Sandhausen	End of contract	
1 July 2021	DF	Paul Jaeckel (GER)	Greuther Fürth	End of contract	
1 July 2021	MF	Genki Haraguchi (JPN)	Hannover 96	End of contract	
1 July 2021	MF	Rani Khedira (GER)	FC Augsburg	End of contract	
1 July 2021	DF	Bastian Oczipka (GER)	Schalke 04	End of contract	
1 July 2021	MF	Levin Öztunali (GER)	Mainz 05	End of contract	
1 July 2021	FW	Andreas Voglsammer (GER)	Arminia Bielefeld	End of contract	
1 July 2021	MF	Paweł Wszołek (POL)	Legia Warsaw (POL)	End of contract	
1 July 2021	DF	Tymoteusz Puchacz (POL)	Lech Poznań (POL)	Undisclosed	
20 July 2021	GK	Frederik Rønnow (DEN)	Eintracht Frankfurt	€1,000,000	
21 July 2021	FW	Taiwo Awoniyi (NGA)	Liverpool (ENG)	€6,500,000	
30 August 2021	MF	Kevin Möhwald (GER)	Werder Bremen	€1,000,000	
31 August 2021	FW	Leon Dajaku (GER)	Bayern Munich	Undisclosed	
31 January 2022	FW	Sven Michel (GER)	SC Paderborn	Undisclosed	

=== Out ===
Date	Pos	Player	To	Fee	Ref.
24 June 2021	MF	Nicolai Rapp (GER)	Werder Bremen	€200,000	
25 June 2021	FW	Marius Bülter (GER)	Schalke 04	€800,000	
30 June 2021	MF	Akaki Gogia (GER)	FC Zürich (SUI)	Released	
30 June 2021	MF	Christian Gentner (GER)	FC Luzern (SUI)	End of contract	
30 June 2021	DF	Florian Hübner (GER)	1. FC Nürnberg	End of contract	
30 June 2021	DF	Christopher Lenz (GER)	Eintracht Frankfurt	End of contract	
21 July 2021	MF	Julius Kade (GER)	Dynamo Dresden	€500,000	
16 August 2021	MF	Robert Andrich (GER)	Bayer Leverkusen	€6,500,000	
11 January 2022	DF	Marvin Friedrich (GER)	Borussia Mönchengladbach	Undisclosed	
30 January 2022	MF	Max Kruse (GER)	VfL Wolfsburg	€5,000,000	

=== Loans out ===
Date from	Pos	Player	To	Date until	Ref.
24 June 2021	MF	Tim Maciejewski (GER)	Austria Klagenfurt (AUT)	30 June 2022	
24 June 2021	GK	Lennart Moser (GER)	Austria Klagenfurt (AUT)	30 June 2022	
30 August 2021	FW	Marcus Ingvartsen (DEN)	Mainz 05	30 June 2022	
31 August 2021	FW	Leon Dajaku (GER)	Sunderland (ENG)	30 June 2022	
10 January 2022	DF	Tymoteusz Puchacz (POL)	Trabzonspor (TUR)	30 June 2022	
18 January 2022	MF	Fabio Schneider (GER)	Kuopion Palloseura (FIN)	30 June 2022	
27 January 2022	MF	Paweł Wszołek (POL)	Legia Warszawa (POL)	30 June 2022	
31 January 2022	DF	Rick van Drongelen (NED)	Mechelen (BEL)	30 June 2022	

== Statistics ==
=== Appearances and goals ===
No.	Pos	Nat	Player	Total		Bundesliga		DFB-Pokal		UEFA Europa Conference League	
No.	Pos	Nat	Player	Apps	Goals	Apps	Goals	Apps	Goals	Apps	Goals
Goalkeepers
1	GK	(Germany) GER	Andreas Luthe	34	0	27	0	2	0	5	0
12	GK	(Denmark) DEN	Jakob Busk	0	0	0	0	0	0	0	0
19	GK	(Denmark) DEN	Frederik Rønnow	10	0	7	0	0	0	3	0
Defenders
3	DF	(Germany) GER	Paul Jaeckel	32	0	22+2	0	3+1	0	3+1	0
20	DF	(Germany) GER	Bastian Oczipka	21	0	9+9	0	3	0	0	0
23	DF	(Germany) GER	Niko Gießelmann	37	3	25+3	3	2+1	0	2+4	0
25	DF	(Germany) GER	Timo Baumgartl	35	1	25	1	5	0	5	0
28	DF	(Austria) AUT	Christopher Trimmel	37	3	23+2	2	4+1	0	7	1
31	DF	(Germany) GER	Robin Knoche	46	1	33	0	5	1	8	0
33	DF	(Germany) GER	Dominique Heintz	8	0	7	0	1	0	0	0
37	DF	(Germany) GER	Mathis Bruns	0	0	0	0	0	0	0	0
Midfielders
6	MF	(Norway) NOR	Julian Ryerson	36	3	13+15	2	1+2	0	1+4	1
7	MF	(Germany) GER	Levin Öztunalı	24	0	5+13	0	1	0	3+2	0
8	MF	(Germany) GER	Rani Khedira	45	0	32	0	4+1	0	8	0
13	MF	(Hungary) HUN	András Schäfer	9	1	1+7	1	0+1	0	0	0
18	MF	(Japan) JPN	Keita Endo	4	0	0+4	0	0	0	0	0
21	MF	(Germany) GER	Grischa Prömel	39	8	28+1	8	4	0	2+4	0
24	MF	(Japan) JPN	Genki Haraguchi	42	2	23+7	2	3+2	0	6+1	0
29	MF	(Germany) GER	Laurenz Dehl	1	0	0	0	0	0	0+1	0
30	MF	(Germany) GER	Kevin Möhwald	21	0	3+13	0	0+2	0	3	0
Forwards
9	FW	(Germany) GER	Andreas Voglsammer	45	6	5+27	2	3+2	2	1+7	2
10	FW	(Germany) GER	Sven Michel	20	6	2+11	3	0+2	1	5	2
11	FW	(Nigeria) NGR	Anthony Ujah	3	0	0+3	0	0	0	0	0
14	FW	(Nigeria) NGR	Taiwo Awoniyi	43	20	29+2	15	3+1	1	6+2	4
17	FW	(Germany) GER	Kevin Behrens	34	6	2+22	2	1+3	2	2+4	2
27	FW	(Suriname) SUR	Sheraldo Becker	40	6	22+6	4	3+1	2	4+4	0
39	FW	(Nigeria) NGR	Suleiman Abdullahi	0	0	0	0	0	0	0	0
Players transferred out during the season
5	DF	(Germany) GER	Marvin Friedrich	21	0	13	0	1	0	7	0
10	FW	(Germany) GER	Max Kruse	23	8	16	5	2	1	5	2
15	MF	(Poland) POL	Paweł Wszołek	1	0	0	0	0+1	0	0	0
26	DF	(Poland) POL	Tymoteusz Puchacz	7	0	0	0	0	0	6+1	0
30	MF	(Germany) GER	Robert Andrich	1	0	0	0	1	0	0	0
32	FW	(Denmark) DEN	Marcus Ingvartsen	5	0	2	0	0+1	0	0+2	0
36	FW	(Germany) GER	Cedric Teuchert	11	0	0+6	0	0+1	0	1+3	0

Last updated: 14 May 2022
Source: Soccerway
