= 2019–20 1. FC Union Berlin season =

Union Berlin
2019–20 season
- Chairman: Dirk Zingler
- Manager: Urs Fischer
- Stadium: Stadion An der Alten Försterei
- Bundesliga: 11th
- DFB-Pokal: Quarter-finals
- Top goalscorer: League: Sebastian Andersson (12); All: Sebastian Andersson (13)
- Highest home attendance: 22,467 vs RB Leipzig (18 August 2019, Bundesliga) (Note: Despite the Stadion An der Alten Försterei having a capacity of 22,012, Union Berlin recorded 455 additional spectators due to an initiative named Endlich dabei ("Finally there" in English), organised by Union Berlin fan groups Alt-Unionern, Eisern V.I.R.U.S. and Eisernen Botschaftern, which saw spectators lift 455 banners of deceased Union Berlin supporters.)
- Lowest home attendance: 20,350 vs 1899 Hoffenheim (17 December 2019, Bundesliga) (Note: Following the COVID-19 pandemic in Germany, all remaining Bundesliga games were hosted behind closed doors, without spectators from May 2020 onwards.)
- Average home league attendance: 21,874
- Biggest win: 0–6 vs VfB Germania Halberstadt (11 August 2019, DFB-Pokal first round)
- Biggest defeat: 5–0 vs Borussia Dortmund (1 February 2020, Bundesliga)
Home colours	Away colours	Third colours

The 2019–20 season was the 55th season in 1. FC Union Berlin's history and their first season in the top flight of German football, the Bundesliga, having been promoted from the 2. Bundesliga in 2019. In addition to the domestic league, Union Berlin also participated in the season's edition of the domestic cup, the DFB-Pokal. Since their foundation, Union have played in the Stadion An der Alten Försterei, located in Berlin, Germany. The season covered a period from 1 July 2019 to 30 June 2020.

== Season review ==
=== Pre-season ===
On 27 May 2019, Union Berlin gained promotion to the Bundesliga for the first time in the club's history, following a 2–2 draw over two legs against VfB Stuttgart, in which Union triumphed on the away goals rule. Following promotion, Union Berlin made 14 signings, including signing Marvin Friedrich, the scorer of the deciding goal against Stuttgart, for €2.5 million from FC Augsburg. The club contested eight pre-season friendlies, winning five, drawing two and losing one.

=== Bundesliga first half (matchday 1–17) ===
Union Berlin's first ever Bundesliga game came against rivals RB Leipzig on 18 August 2019, losing 4–0. The club's oldest ultras group, the Wuhlesyndikat, successfully called for a 15-minute silent protest at the start of the game, aimed in protest at Leipzig's ownership model. Six days later, the club picked up their first Bundesliga point, drawing 1–1 away at FC Augsburg, with forward Sebastian Andersson scoring Union Berlin's first ever Bundesliga goal. On matchday 3, Union Berlin gained their first ever Bundesliga win, in a shock 3–1 home victory against UEFA Champions League outfit Borussia Dortmund. During the first five matchdays, International Centre for Sports Studies research concluded that Union Berlin had the highest average height across the top 31 European first divisions. On 2 November 2019, Union Berlin recorded their third Bundesliga win of the season, thanks to a 1–0 home win against Berlin rivals Hertha BSC; the first meeting between the pair in the top flight of German football. Despite Sebastian Polter scoring a late winner from the penalty spot, the game was not without controversy, as referee Deniz Aytekin temporarily halted the game, following fireworks from the away section entering the home sections and the field of play. Following full-time, Rafał Gikiewicz won praise from fans and media alike, after helping prevent a minor pitch invasion from a section of Union Berlin ultras, aimed at attacking Hertha supporters, after Union Berlin flags, shirts and scarves were burnt in the away end during the game. The win lifted Union to 14th place in the Bundesliga table, three points above the relegation play-off place.

On 23 November 2019, Union Berlin recorded their fourth consecutive competitive win, following a 2–0 victory over Bundesliga leaders Borussia Mönchengladbach, with second half goalscorer Andersson sitting at fourth in the Bundesliga scoring charts following the win. At the halfway point of the season, Union sat in eleventh place, one place and one point above city rivals Hertha BSC.

=== Bundesliga second half (matchday 18–34) ===
During the January transfer winter, Union Berlin made one signing, loaning Yunus Mallı in from VfL Wolfsburg until the summer. On matchday 19, Union Berlin recorded their first win after the winter break, following a 3–1 loss to RB Leipzig a week prior, after defeating Augsburg 2–0, with Neven Subotić scoring his first goal for the club. On 1 March 2020, Sebastian Andersson scored his tenth Bundesliga goal of the season in a 2–2 home draw against VfL Wolfsburg, ending an eight game long drought. The game was suspended for over ten minutes during the first half, after protests from Union Berlin's fans against TSG 1899 Hoffenheim's owner Dietmar Hopp in solidarity with Bayern Munich, Borussia Dortmund and 1. FC Köln supporters, who had all protested against Hopp's involvement with Hoffenheim on the same weekend. On 4 March 2020, Union Berlin were knocked out of the DFB-Pokal at the quarter-final stage, in a 3–1 loss against Bayer Leverkusen.

Ahead of matchday 26, the Bundesliga was suspended, owing to the COVID-19 pandemic in Germany, with the Deutsche Fußball Liga recommending a suspension until 2 April 2020. The second Berlin derby of the season, originally scheduled for 21 March 2020, was due to be played behind closed doors following advice from the Bundesministerium für Gesundheit, but was later postponed following the Bundesliga's suspension until 2 April. In mid-April, clubs returned to training. On 7 May 2020, the Deutscher Fußball-Bund announced resumption of the Bundesliga without spectators in mid-May, with the final weekend of the season set to be played on 27 June 2020. On 17 May 2020, after six Bundesliga matchday 26 games were played a day prior, Union Berlin lost 2–0 at home to Bayern Munich behind closed doors. On 22 May 2020, Hertha BSC played Union Berlin at the Olympiastadion behind closed doors in the second Berlin derby of the season, winning 4–0; the biggest competitive victory between the pair.

== Players ==
=== Squad information ===
As of 23 Apr 2020

Note: Flags indicate national team as defined under FIFA eligibility rules; some limited exceptions apply. Players may hold more than one non-FIFA nationality.

No.	Pos.	Nation	Player
1	GK	POL	Rafał Gikiewicz
3	DF	SRB	Neven Subotić
5	DF	GER	Marvin Friedrich
6	MF	NOR	Julian Ryerson
7	MF	GER	Akaki Gogia
8	MF	GER	Joshua Mees
9	FW	GER	Sebastian Polter
10	FW	SWE	Sebastian Andersson
11	FW	NGA	Anthony Ujah
12	GK	DEN	Jakob Busk
14	DF	GER	Ken Reichel
15	FW	GER	Marius Bülter (on loan from 1. FC Magdeburg)
16	FW	GER	Laurenz Dehl
17	MF	AUT	Florian Flecker
18	MF	TUR	Yunus Mallı (on loan from VfL Wolfsburg)
19	DF	GER	Florian Hübner
20	FW	NGA	Suleiman Abdullahi

No.	Pos.	Nation	Player
21	MF	GER	Grischa Prömel
23	MF	GER	Felix Kroos
24	MF	GER	Manuel Schmiedebach
25	DF	GER	Christopher Lenz
26	MF	GER	Julius Kade
27	FW	NED	Sheraldo Becker
28	DF	AUT	Christopher Trimmel (Captain)
29	DF	GER	Michael Parensen
30	MF	GER	Robert Andrich
31	DF	GER	Keven Schlotterbeck (on loan from SC Freiburg)
32	FW	DEN	Marcus Ingvartsen
34	MF	GER	Christian Gentner
35	GK	GER	Moritz Nicolas (on loan from Borussia Mönchengladbach)
39	GK	GER	Leo Oppermann
40	MF	GER	Maurice Arcones
—	FW	GER	Tim Maciejewski

=== Transfers ===
==== Summer ====
In:

No.	Pos.	Nation	Player
3	DF	SRB	Neven Subotić (from AS Saint-Étienne)
5	DF	GER	Marvin Friedrich (re-purchased from FC Augsburg)
11	FW	NGA	Anthony Ujah (from 1. FSV Mainz 05)
15	FW	GER	Marius Bülter (on loan from 1. FC Magdeburg)
16	FW	GER	Laurenz Dehl (from 1. FC Union Berlin youth)
17	MF	AUT	Florian Flecker (from TSV Hartberg)
20	FW	NGA	Suleiman Abdullahi (loan option purchased from Eintracht Braunschweig)
24	MF	GER	Manuel Schmiedebach (loan option converted from Hannover 96)
26	MF	GER	Julius Kade (from Hertha BSC)
27	FW	NED	Sheraldo Becker (from ADO Den Haag)
30	MF	GER	Robert Andrich (from 1. FC Heidenheim)
31	DF	GER	Keven Schlotterbeck (on loan from SC Freiburg)
32	FW	DEN	Marcus Ingvartsen (from Genk)
34	MF	GER	Christian Gentner (from VfB Stuttgart)
35	GK	GER	Moritz Nicolas (on loan from Borussia Mönchengladbach)
39	GK	GER	Leo Oppermann (from 1. FC Union Berlin youth)
40	MF	GER	Maurice Arcones (from 1. FC Union Berlin youth)

Out:

No.	Pos.	Nation	Player
4	DF	GER	Lars Dietz (on loan to FC Viktoria Köln)
7	MF	GER	Marcel Hartel (to Arminia Bielefeld)
13	DF	GER	Peter Kurzweg (to FC Ingolstadt 04)
15	DF	ESP	Marc Torrejón (released)
17	FW	POR	Carlos Mané (loan period ended from Sporting CP)
27	MF	KOS	Eroll Zejnullahu (released)
30	GK	GER	Lennart Moser (on loan to FC Energie Cottbus)
31	MF	TUR	Berkan Taz (on loan to FC Energie Cottbus)
32	MF	AUT	Robert Žulj (loan period ended from 1899 Hoffenheim)
34	DF	GER	Fabian Schönheim (released)
36	DF	TUR	Cihan Kahraman (mutual contract termination)

==== Winter ====
In:

No.	Pos.	Nation	Player
18	MF	TUR	Yunus Mallı (on loan from VfL Wolfsburg)
—	FW	GER	Tim Maciejewski (from 1. FC Union Berlin youth)

Out:

No.	Pos.	Nation	Player
18	DF	GER	Nicolai Rapp (on loan to SV Darmstadt 98)
30	GK	GER	Lennart Moser (on loan to Cercle Brugge K.S.V.)
33	DF	USA	Lennard Maloney (on loan to Chemnitzer FC)

== Friendly matches ==
Win Draw Loss

6 July 2019 Friendly	Union Berlin	2–1	Brøndby	Berlin
15:30	Andersson 63'; Mees 90'	Report	Arajuuri 82'	Stadium: Stadion An der Alten Försterei; Attendance: 12,307

12 July 2019 Friendly	SV Ried	0–3	Union Berlin	Windischgarsten, Austria
18:00		Kicker	Friedrich 9'; Prömel 29', 33'	Stadium: Windischgarsten Sports Club; Attendance: 250

13 July 2019 Friendly	Blau-Weiß Linz	0–3	Union Berlin	Linz, Austria
15:00		Kicker	Kade 55'; Polter 64'; Hartel 73'	Stadium: Linzer Stadion; Attendance: 750

17 July 2019 Friendly	First Vienna	1–4	Union Berlin	Vienna, Austria
19:00	Kurtiši 55'	Kicker	Bülter 14', 44'; Polter 15'; Ujah 73'	Stadium: Hohe Warte Stadium; Attendance: 4,100

20 July 2019 Friendly	Erzgebirge Aue	1–1	Union Berlin	Aue
15:30	Daferner 85'	Kicker	Ujah 17'	Stadium: Erzgebirgsstadion; Attendance: 3,743

27 July 2019 Friendly	VfL Wolfsburg	1–1	Union Berlin	Anif, Austria
15:00 (120 minute friendly)	João Victor 78'	kicker	Andersson 2'	Stadium: Maximarkt Sportpark; Attendance: 300

3 August 2019 Friendly	Union Berlin	0–3	Celta Vigo	Berlin
16:00		Kicker	Méndez 22'; Mina 57'; Jorge 82'	Stadium: Stadion An der Alten Försterei; Attendance: 11,032

12 August 2019 Friendly	SV Lichtenberg 47	1–4	Union Berlin	Berlin
17:30	Hollwitz 68'	kicker	Ujah 22', 53'; Polter 41', 72' (pen.)	Stadium: Hans-Zoschke-Stadion; Attendance: 2,000

5 September 2019 Friendly	Chemnitzer FC	1–3	Union Berlin	Hoyerswerda
17:30	Garcia 82'	Report	Kade 46'; Gogia 55'; Abdullahi 74'	Stadium: Friedrich-Ludwig-Jahn-Sportpark; Attendance: 1,800

10 October 2019 Friendly	Union Berlin	0–0	Dynamo Dresden	Berlin
14:00		Report		Stadium: Stadion An der Alten Försterei; Attendance: 2,300

13 November 2019 Friendly	Union Berlin	3–0	Holstein Kiel	Berlin
17:30	Becker 27'; Reichel 67'; Kade 80'	Report		Stadium: Stadion An der Alten Försterei; Attendance: 2,541

6 January 2020 Friendly	Union Berlin	2–1	OH Leuven	Alicante, Spain
11:00	Andrich 66'; Polter 77'	Report	Asane 76'	Stadium: Sportcomplex Laos De Campoamor; Attendance: 250

6 January 2020 Friendly	Union Berlin	2–2	Union SG	Alicante, Spain
16:00	Becker 14'; Ujah 37'	Report	Sigurðarson 53'; Haugen 87'	Stadium: Sportcomplex Laos De Campoamor; Attendance: 300

11 January 2020 Friendly	Union Berlin	3–2	Ferencváros	Alicante, Spain
15:00	Friedrich 6'; Ujah 15'; Andersson 36'	Report	Isael 5'; Lodico 42'	Stadium: Sportcomplex Laos De Campoamor; Attendance: 250

19 January 2020 Friendly	Union Berlin	1–2	St. Gallen	Berlin
14:00	Ujah 30'	Report	Demirović 12'; Itten 58'	Stadium: Stadion An der Alten Försterei

25 March 2020 Friendly	Union Berlin	Cancelled	Arminia Bielefeld	Berlin
14:45				Stadium: Stadion An der Alten Försterei
Note: The match was cancelled due to the COVID-19 pandemic in Germany.

== Competitions ==
Win Draw Loss

=== Overview ===
Competition	First match	Last match	Starting round	Final position	Record							
Competition	First match	Last match	Starting round	Final position	Pld	W	D	L	GF	GA	GD	Win %
Bundesliga	18 August 2019	27 June 2020	Matchday 1	11th	34	12	5	17	41	58	−17	35.29
DFB-Pokal	11 August 2019	4 March 2020	First round	Quarter-finals	4	3	0	1	11	4	+7	75.00
Total					38	15	5	18	52	62	−10	39.47

Last updated: 27 June 2020
Source: Competitions

=== Bundesliga ===
==== League table ====
Pos	Team	Pld	W	D	L	GF	GA	GD	Pts
9	Eintracht Frankfurt	34	13	6	15	59	60	−1	45
10	Hertha BSC	34	11	8	15	48	59	−11	41
11	Union Berlin	34	12	5	17	41	58	−17	41
12	Schalke 04	34	9	12	13	38	58	−20	39
13	Mainz 05	34	11	4	19	44	65	−21	37

Source: DFB
Rules for classification: 1) Points; 2) Goal difference; 3) Goals scored; 4) Head-to-head results; 5) Head-to-head away goals scored; 6) Away goals scored; 7) Play-off.

==== Results summary ====
Overall								Home						Away					
Pld	W	D	L	GF	GA	GD	Pts	W	D	L	GF	GA	GD	W	D	L	GF	GA	GD
34	12	5	17	41	58	−17	41	8	3	6	24	20	+4	4	2	11	17	38	−21

Last updated: 27 June 2020.
Source: Bundesliga

==== Results by round ====
Round	1	2	3	4	5	6	7	8	9	10	11	12	13	14	15	16	17	18	19	20	21	22	23	24	25	26	27	28	29	30	31	32	33	34
Ground	H	A	H	H	A	H	A	H	A	H	A	H	A	H	A	H	A	A	H	A	A	H	A	H	A	H	A	H	A	H	A	H	A	H
Result	L	D	W	L	L	L	L	W	L	W	W	W	L	W	D	L	L	L	W	L	W	L	W	D	L	L	L	D	L	D	W	W	L	W
Position	18	14	11	12	14	15	16	14	15	14	11	11	11	10	10	11	11	12	11	12	11	12	11	11	11	12	13	14	14	14	14	12	12	11

Updated to match(es) played on 27 June 2020. Source: Bundesliga
A = Away; H = Home; W = Win; D = Draw; L = Loss

==== Matches ====
The Bundesliga schedule was announced on 28 June 2019.

18 August 2019 1	Union Berlin	0–4	RB Leipzig	Berlin
18:00	Becker (yellow card) 82'	Kicker	Halstenberg 16'; Sabitzer 31'; Werner 42'; Nkunku 69'	Stadium: Stadion An der Alten Försterei; Attendance: 22,467; Referee: Markus Schmidt

24 August 2019 2	FC Augsburg	1–1	Union Berlin	Augsburg
15:30	Vargas 59'	Kicker	Andersson 80'; Schlotterbeck (red card) 84'	Stadium: WWK Arena; Attendance: 27,704; Referee: Robert Schröder

31 August 2019 3	Union Berlin	3–1	Borussia Dortmund	Berlin
18:30	Bülter 22', 50'; Andersson 75'	Kicker	Alcácer 25'	Stadium: Stadion An der Alten Försterei; Attendance: 22,012; Referee: Felix Brych

14 September 2019 4	Union Berlin	1–2	Werder Bremen	Berlin
15:30	Andersson 14' (pen.); Subotić (yellow card) 80' (yellow-red card) 89'	Kicker	Klaassen 5' (pen.); Füllkrug 55'; Şahin (yellow card) 76' (yellow-red card) 90+1'	Stadium: Stadion An der Alten Försterei; Attendance: 22,012; Referee: Tobias Welz

21 September 2019 5	Bayer Leverkusen	2–0	Union Berlin	Leverkusen
15:30	Volland 20'; Alario 25'	Kicker	Polter (red card) 66'; Schlotterbeck (yellow card) 86'	Stadium: BayArena; Attendance: 27,430; Referee: Robert Hartmann

27 September 2019 6	Union Berlin	1–2	Eintracht Frankfurt	Berlin
20:30	Ujah 86'; Andrich (yellow card) 89'	Kicker	Sow (yellow card) 36'; Dost 48'; Silva 62'	Stadium: Stadion An der Alten Försterei; Attendance: 22,012; Referee: Sascha Stegemann

6 October 2019 7	VfL Wolfsburg	1–0	Union Berlin	Wolfsburg
15:30	Guilavogui (yellow card) 32'; Bruma (yellow card) 37'; Weghorst 69'	Kicker	Andrich (yellow card) 26'; Friedrich (yellow card) 65'	Stadium: Volkswagen Arena; Attendance: 27,012; Referee: Bastian Dankert

19 October 2019 8	Union Berlin	2–0	SC Freiburg	Berlin
15:30	Bülter 1'; Gentner (yellow card) 11'; Andrich (yellow card) 66'; Ingvartsen (yellow card) 76', (goal) 84'	Kicker		Stadium: Stadion An der Alten Försterei; Attendance: 22,012; Referee: Benjamin Cortus

26 October 2019 9	Bayern Munich	2–1	Union Berlin	Munich
15:30	Pavard 13'; Lewandowski 53'	Kicker	Andrich (yellow card) 17'; Polter 86' (pen.)	Stadium: Allianz Arena; Attendance: 75,000; Referee: Marco Fritz

2 November 2019 10	Union Berlin	1–0	Hertha BSC	Berlin
18:30	Schlotterbeck (yellow card) 61'; Polter 87' (pen.)	Kicker	Boyata (yellow card) 69'	Stadium: Stadion An der Alten Försterei; Attendance: 22,012; Referee: Deniz Aytekin

9 November 2019 11	Mainz 05	2–3	Union Berlin	Mainz
15:30	St. Juste (yellow card) 42'; Onisiwo 81'; Brosinski 90+4'	Kicker	Andrich (yellow card) 4'; Brosinski 30' (o.g.); Andersson 45+3', 51'; Parensen (yellow card) 49'; Polter (yellow card) 69'; Friedrich (yellow card) 72'	Stadium: Opel Arena; Attendance: 24,349; Referee: Harm Osmers

23 November 2019 12	Union Berlin	2–0	Borussia Mönchengladbach	Berlin
15:30	Ujah 15'; Kroos (yellow card) 29'; Andersson 90+2'	Kicker	Stindl (yellow card) 90+1'	Stadium: Stadion An der Alten Försterei; Attendance: 22,012; Referee: Felix Brych

29 November 2019 13	Schalke 04	2–1	Union Berlin	Gelsenkirchen
20:30	Raman 23'; Serdar 86'; McKennie (yellow card) 90'	Kicker	Schlotterbeck (yellow card) 22'; Ingvartsen 36' (pen.); Andersson (yellow card) 38'; Hübner (yellow card) 42'; Friedrich (yellow card) 69'	Stadium: Veltins-Arena; Attendance: 61,837; Referee: Daniel Schlager

8 December 2019 14	Union Berlin	2–0	1. FC Köln	Berlin
15:30	Andersson 33', 50'; Andrich (yellow card) 82'	Kicker	Sobiech (yellow card) 8'; Ehizibue (yellow card) 45'; Drexler (yellow card) 65'	Stadium: Stadion An der Alten Försterei; Attendance: 22,012; Referee: Patrick Ittrich

14 December 2019 15	SC Paderborn	1–1	Union Berlin	Paderborn
15:30	Pröger 33'; Zolinski (yellow card) 82'; Gjasula (yellow card) 85'	Kicker	Ingvartsen 7', (yellow card) 20'; Parensen (yellow card) 36'; Trimmel (yellow card) 59'; Mees (yellow card) 72'	Stadium: Benteler-Arena; Attendance: 14,414; Referee: Sven Jablonski

17 December 2019 16	Union Berlin	0–2	1899 Hoffenheim	Berlin
20:30	Ingvartsen (yellow card) 42'; Andrich (yellow card) 53'	Kicker	Skov (yellow card) 15'; Samassékou (yellow card) 26'; Posch (yellow card) 30'; Hübner (yellow card) 54'; Bebou 56'; Kadeřábek (yellow card) 61'; Kramarić (yellow card) 75'; Baumgartner 90+1'	Stadium: Stadion An der Alten Försterei; Attendance: 20,350; Referee: Sören Storks

22 December 2019 17	Fortuna Düsseldorf	2–1	Union Berlin	Düsseldorf
15:30	Hennings 38'; Bodzek (yellow card) 68'; Thommy 90', (yellow card) 90+1'	Kicker	Lenz (yellow card) 46'; Parensen 48'; Trimmel (yellow card) 81'; Friedrich (yellow card) 84'; Gentner (yellow card) 90+4'	Stadium: Merkur Spiel-Arena; Attendance: 45,490; Referee: Benjamin Cortus

18 January 2020 18	RB Leipzig	3–1	Union Berlin	Leipzig
18:30	Werner 51', 83'; Sabitzer 57'; Haidara (yellow card) 88'	Kicker	Bülter 10'; Andersson (yellow card) 60'; Ryerson (yellow card) 71'; Parensen (yellow card) 80'	Stadium: Red Bull Arena; Attendance: 42,146; Referee: Bastian Dankert

25 January 2020 19	Union Berlin	2–0	FC Augsburg	Berlin
15:30	Subotić 47', (yellow card) 68'; Ingvartsen 61'; Schlotterbeck (yellow card) 67'; Gentner (yellow card) 70'; Andrich (yellow card) 74'	Kicker	Gouweleeuw (yellow card) 45+1'	Stadium: Stadion An der Alten Försterei; Attendance: 22,012; Referee: Bibiana Steinhaus

1 February 2020 20	Borussia Dortmund	5–0	Union Berlin	Dortmund
15:30	Sancho 13'; Haaland 18', 76'; Reus 68' (pen.); Witsel 70'	Kicker	Friedrich (yellow card) 64'	Stadium: Signal Iduna Park; Attendance: 81,365; Referee: Benjamin Cortus

8 February 2020 21	Werder Bremen	0–2	Union Berlin	Bremen
15:30	Selke (yellow card) 16'; Toprak (yellow card) 30'; Vogt (yellow card) 30'; Friedl (yellow card) 80'	Kicker	Bülter 52', 72'; Trimmel (yellow card) 67'; Prömel (yellow card) 80'; Andersson (yellow card) 86'	Stadium: Wohninvest Weserstadion; Attendance: 42,100; Referee: Daniel Schlager

15 February 2020 22	Union Berlin	2–3	Bayer Leverkusen	Berlin
15:30	Gentner 7', (yellow card) 56'; Trimmel (yellow card) 14'; Bülter 87'	Kicker	Weiser (yellow card) 20'; Havertz 22'; S. Bender (yellow card) 38'; Diaby 84'; Bellarabi 90+4'	Stadium: Stadion An der Alten Försterei; Attendance: 22,012; Referee: Harm Osmers

24 February 2020 23	Eintracht Frankfurt	1–2	Union Berlin	Frankfurt
20:30	Kamada (yellow card) 39'; Paciência (yellow card) 66'; Hübner 79' (o.g.); Kohr (yellow card) 88'	Kicker	Ryerson (yellow card) 39'; Hübner (yellow card) 44'; Andersson 49', (yellow card) 82'; Mallı (yellow card) 50'; Ndicka 67' (o.g.)	Stadium: Commerzbank-Arena; Attendance: 47,000; Referee: Deniz Aytekin

1 March 2020 24	Union Berlin	2–2	VfL Wolfsburg	Berlin
13:30	Andersson 41'; Andrich (yellow card) 53'; Friedrich 56'	Kicker	Arnold (yellow card) 40'; Gerhardt 60'; Steffen (yellow card) 61'; Weghorst 81'	Stadium: Stadion An der Alten Försterei; Attendance: 22,012; Referee: Bastian Dankert

7 March 2020 25	SC Freiburg	3–1	Union Berlin	Freiburg im Breisgau
15:30	Günter (yellow card) 12', (goal) 55'; Sallai 34', (yellow card) 60'; Koch 82'	Kicker	Friedrich (yellow card) 47' (yellow-red card) 90+2'; Andersson 61'; Ingvartsen (yellow card) 75'	Stadium: Schwarzwald-Stadion; Attendance: 24,000; Referee: Marco Fritz

17 May 2020 26	Union Berlin	0–2	Bayern Munich	Berlin
18:00	Lenz (yellow card) 12'; Schlotterbeck (yellow card) 51'	Kicker	Davies (yellow card) 37'; Lewandowski 40' (pen.); Pavard 80'	Stadium: Stadion An der Alten Försterei; Attendance: 0 Referee: Bastian Dankert
Note: The match was postponed on 13 March due to the pandemic of COVID-19 in Germany, and rescheduled to 17 May.

22 May 2020 27	Hertha BSC	4–0	Union Berlin	Berlin
20:30	Lukebakio (yellow card) 43', (goal) 52'; Ibišević 51'; Cunha 61'; Grujić (yellow card) 67'; Boyata 77'	Kicker	Parensen (yellow card) 9'	Stadium: Olympiastadion; Attendance: 0 Referee: Harm Osmers
Note: The match was postponed on 13 March due to the pandemic of COVID-19 in Germany, and rescheduled to 22 May.

27 May 2020 28	Union Berlin	1–1	Mainz 05	Berlin
20:30	Andrich (yellow card) 20' (yellow-red card) 42'; Ingvartsen 33'; Schlotterbeck (yellow card) 78'; Friedrich (yellow card) 90+2'	Kicker	Baku 13'; Boëtius (yellow card) 78'; Latza (yellow card) 89'	Stadium: Stadion An der Alten Försterei; Attendance: 0 Referee: Robert Schröder
Note: The match was postponed on 24 March due to the pandemic of COVID-19 in Germany, and rescheduled to 27 May.

31 May 2020 29	Borussia Mönchengladbach	4–1	Union Berlin	Mönchengladbach
15:30	Neuhaus 17', (yellow card) 61'; Hofmann (yellow card) 33'; Thuram 41', 59'; Lainer (yellow card) 43'; Pléa 81'	Kicker	Bülter (yellow card) 19'; Friedrich (yellow card) 30'; Andersson 50'	Stadium: Borussia-Park; Attendance: 0 Referee: Frank Willenborg
Note: The match was postponed on 24 March due to the pandemic of COVID-19 in Germany, and rescheduled to 31 May.

7 June 2020 30	Union Berlin	1–1	Schalke 04	Berlin
15:30	Andrich 11', (yellow card) 37'; Trimmel (yellow card) 36'; Friedrich (yellow card) 73'	Kicker	Kenny 28'; Miranda (yellow card) 78'	Stadium: Stadion An der Alten Försterei; Attendance: 0 Referee: Tobias Stieler
Note: The match was postponed on 24 March due to the pandemic of COVID-19 in Germany, and rescheduled to 7 June.

13 June 2020 31	1. FC Köln	1–2	Union Berlin	Cologne
15:30	Hector (yellow card) 44'; Skhiri (yellow card) 76'; Leistner (yellow card) 80'; Córdoba 90+2'	Kicker	Friedrich 39'; Gentner 67'	Stadium: RheinEnergieStadion; Attendance: 0 Referee: Martin Petersen
Note: The match was postponed on 24 March due to the pandemic of COVID-19 in Germany, and rescheduled to 13 June.

16 June 2020 32	Union Berlin	1–0	SC Paderborn	Berlin
20:30	Zolinski 27' (o.g.); Prömel (yellow card) 50'	Kicker	Vasiliadis (yellow card) 53'	Stadium: Stadion An der Alten Försterei; Attendance: 0 Referee: Bibiana Steinhaus
Note: The match was postponed on 24 March due to the pandemic of COVID-19 in Germany, and rescheduled to 16 June.

20 June 2020 33	1899 Hoffenheim	4–0	Union Berlin	Sinsheim
15:30 CEST (UTC+02:00)	Bebou 11'; Kramarić 39'; Dabbur (yellow card) 41', (goal) 45+2'; Baumgartner 68'	Kicker	Friedrich (yellow card) 21'; Andrich (yellow card) 30'; Andersson (yellow card) 81'	Stadium: PreZero Arena; Attendance: 0 Referee: Robert Hartmann
Note: The match was postponed on 24 March due to the pandemic of COVID-19 in Germany, and rescheduled to 20 June.

27 June 2020 34	Union Berlin	3–0	Fortuna Düsseldorf	Berlin
15:30 CEST (UTC+02:00)	Ujah 26'; Gentner 54'; Abdullahi 90'	Kicker	Kownacki (yellow card) 73'	Stadium: Stadion An der Alten Försterei; Attendance: 0 Referee: Harm Osmers
Note: The match was postponed on 7 May due to the pandemic of COVID-19 in Germany, and rescheduled to 27 June.

=== DFB-Pokal ===
11 August 2019 First round	VfB Germania Halberstadt	0–6	Union Berlin	Halberstadt
15:30		Report	Schlotterbeck 27'; Andersson 65'; Lenz 67'; Mees 71'; Andrich 76'; Ujah 89'	Stadium: Friedensstadion; Attendance: 6,000; Referee: Tobias Reichel

29 October 2019 Second round	SC Freiburg	1–3	Union Berlin	Freiburg im Breisgau
18:30	Schlotterbeck (yellow card) 30'; Koch 45+2', (yellow card) 89'; Heintz (yellow card) 76'	Report	Schmiedebach (yellow card) 21'; Mees 36'; Rapp (yellow card) 47'; Ingvartsen (yellow card) 67'; Friedrich (yellow card) 72'; Andrich 87'; Gentner 90+2'	Stadium: Schwarzwald-Stadion; Attendance: 24,000; Referee: Robert Kampka

5 February 2020 Round of 16	SC Verl	0–1	Union Berlin	Verl
18:30	Hecker (yellow card) 43'; Schöppner (yellow card) 84'	Report	Ingvartsen (yellow card) 7'; Andrich (yellow card) 56', (goal) 86'	Stadium: Sportclub Arena; Attendance: 5,135; Referee: Sven Jablonski

4 March 2020 Quarter-finals	Bayer Leverkusen	3–1	Union Berlin	Leverkusen
18:30	Tah (yellow card) 44'; Aránguiz (yellow card) 55', (goal) 86'; Diaby (yellow card) 69', (goal) 90+1'; Bellarabi (yellow card) 70', (goal) 72'; Alario (yellow card) 90+2'	Report	Ingvartsen 39'; Parensen (yellow card) 48'; Lenz (yellow card) 61' (yellow-red card) 71'; Gikiewicz (yellow card) 90+2'	Stadium: BayArena; Attendance: 18,453; Referee: Benjamin Cortus

== Squad and statistics ==
As of 8 June 2020

No.	Pos	Player	Bundesliga		DFB-Pokal		Total	
No.	Pos	Player	Apps	Goals	Apps	Goals	Apps	Goals
1	GK	(Poland) Rafał Gikiewicz	30	0	4	0	34	0
3	DF	(Serbia) Neven Subotić	22	1	0	0	22	1
5	DF	(Germany) Marvin Friedrich	27	1	3	0	30	1
6	DF	(Norway) Julian Ryerson	14	0	3	0	17	0
7	MF	(Germany) Akaki Gogia	3	0	0	0	3	0
8	MF	(Germany) Joshua Mees	11	0	2	2	13	2
9	FW	(Germany) Sebastian Polter	13	2	0	0	13	2
10	FW	(Sweden) Sebastian Andersson	30	12	3	1	33	13
11	FW	(Nigeria) Anthony Ujah	20	2	4	1	24	3
12	GK	(Denmark) Jakob Busk	0	0	0	0	0	0
14	DF	(Germany) Ken Reichel	3	0	0	0	3	0
15	FW	(Germany) Marius Bülter	29	7	4	0	33	7
16	FW	(Germany) Laurenz Dehl	0	0	0	0	0	0
17	MF	(Austria) Florian Flecker	0	0	0	0	0	0
18	MF	(Turkey) Yunus Mallı	10	0	0	0	10	0
19	DF	(Germany) Florian Hübner	10	0	0	0	10	0
20	FW	(Nigeria) Suleiman Abdullahi	4	0	0	0	4	0
21	MF	(Germany) Grischa Prömel	12	0	3	0	15	0
23	MF	(Germany) Felix Kroos	11	0	1	0	12	0
24	MF	(Germany) Manuel Schmiedebach	3	0	1	0	4	0
25	DF	(Germany) Christopher Lenz	25	0	4	1	29	1
26	MF	(Germany) Julius Kade	0	0	0	0	0	0
27	FW	(Netherlands) Sheraldo Becker	12	0	1	0	13	0
28	DF	(Austria) Christopher Trimmel	28	0	3	0	31	0
29	DF	(Germany) Michael Parensen	7	1	4	0	11	1
30	MF	(Germany) Robert Andrich	28	1	4	3	32	4
31	DF	(Germany) Keven Schlotterbeck	19	0	4	1	23	1
32	FW	(Denmark) Marcus Ingvartsen	24	5	4	1	28	6
34	MF	(Germany) Christian Gentner	28	1	3	1	31	2
35	GK	(Germany) Moritz Nicolas	0	0	0	0	0	0
40	MF	(Germany) Maurice Arcones	0	0	0	0	0	0
Players transferred out during the season
18	DF	(Germany) Nicolai Rapp	0	0	1	0	1	0
