= Julian Ryerson =

Norwegian footballer (born 1997)

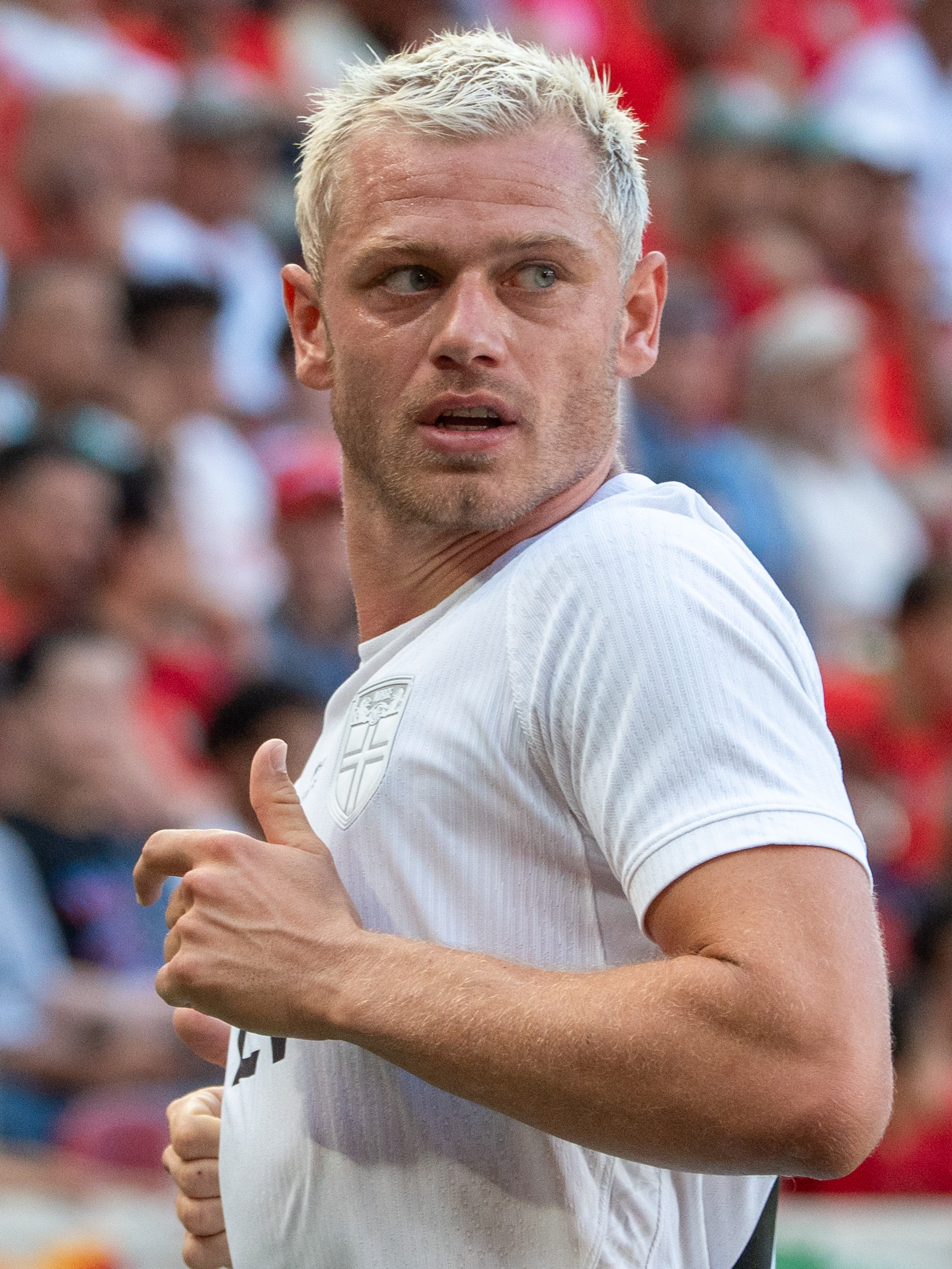
- Ryerson with Norway in 2026

Personal information
- Full name: Julian Ryerson
- Date of birth: 17 November 1997 (age 29)
- Place of birth: Flekkefjord Municipality, Norway
- Height: 1.83 m (6 ft 0 in)
- Positions: Full-back; wing-back

Team information
- Current team: Borussia Dortmund
- Number: 26

Youth career
- 2007–2012: Lyngdal IL
- 2012–2015: Viking

Senior career*
Years	Team	Apps	(Gls)
2015–2018	Viking	63	(7)
2018–2023	Union Berlin	87	(2)
2023–	Borussia Dortmund	105	(7)

International career^{‡}
2015	Norway U17	12	(0)
2016	Norway U19	3	(0)
2017	Norway U21	13	(1)
2020–	Norway	52	(1)
- * Club domestic league appearances and goals as of 31 October 2026 ‡ National team caps and goals as of 18 November 2026

Julian Ryerson (Norwegian pronunciation: [ˈryːərsɔn]; born 17 November 1997) is a Norwegian professional footballer who plays as a full-back or wing-back for Bundesliga club Borussia Dortmund and the Norway national team.

== Club career ==
=== Viking ===
Ryerson signed for Viking from Lyngdal IL in the summer of 2013. He got his breakthrough for the first-team in the 2016 season, when he played 18 matches in the league. Ryerson played primarily right-back in those matches.

=== Union Berlin ===
In July 2018, Ryerson joined 2. Bundesliga side 1. FC Union Berlin on a three-year deal until 2021. Following his club's promotion to Bundesliga, he scored his inaugural goal in a 5–2 home defeat to Bayern Munich on 30 October 2021 during the 2021–22 season. One month later, on 25 November, he scored his first goal in European competitions, securing a 1–0 away win over Maccabi Haifa in the Conference League.

=== Borussia Dortmund ===
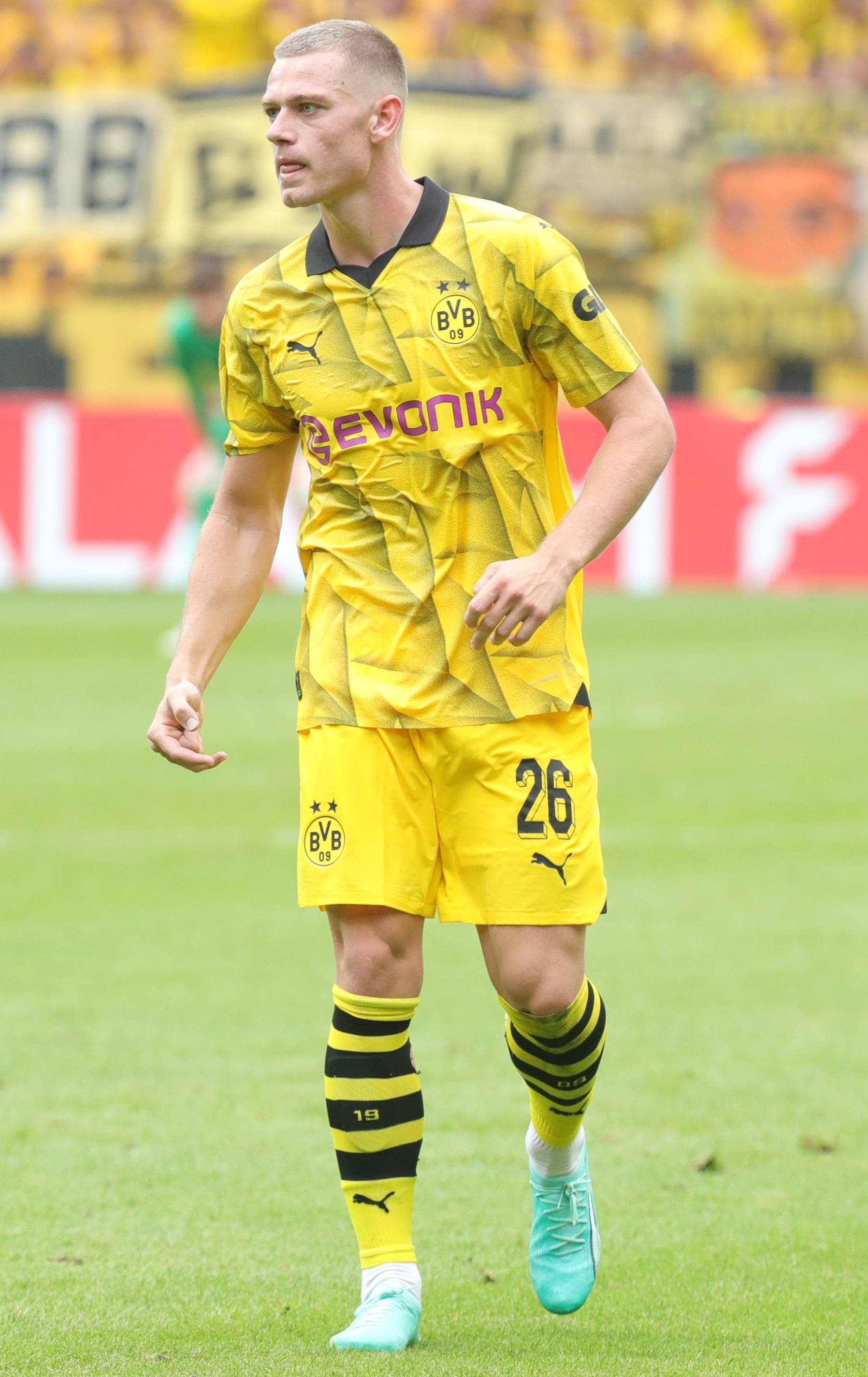
Ryerson playing for Borussia Dortmund in 2023

On 17 January 2023, Borussia Dortmund signed Ryerson to replace the injured Thomas Meunier, with a contract until June 2026. One week later, on 25 January, he scored his first goal in a 2–1 away victory over Mainz. In the following month, he made his Champions League debut on 15 February in a 1–0 victory over Chelsea in the round of 16 first leg. On 30 March 2024, he scored the second goal in a 2–0 away win over Bayern Munich, to be his club's first victory in Der Klassiker since 2019 and the first win at Allianz Arena in 10 years. On 13 February 2026, he provided four assists, all from crosses, in a 4–0 win over Mainz, becoming the fourth player in Bundesliga history, as well as the second player in Dortmund history, after Pascal Groß a year prior, to do so.

== International career ==
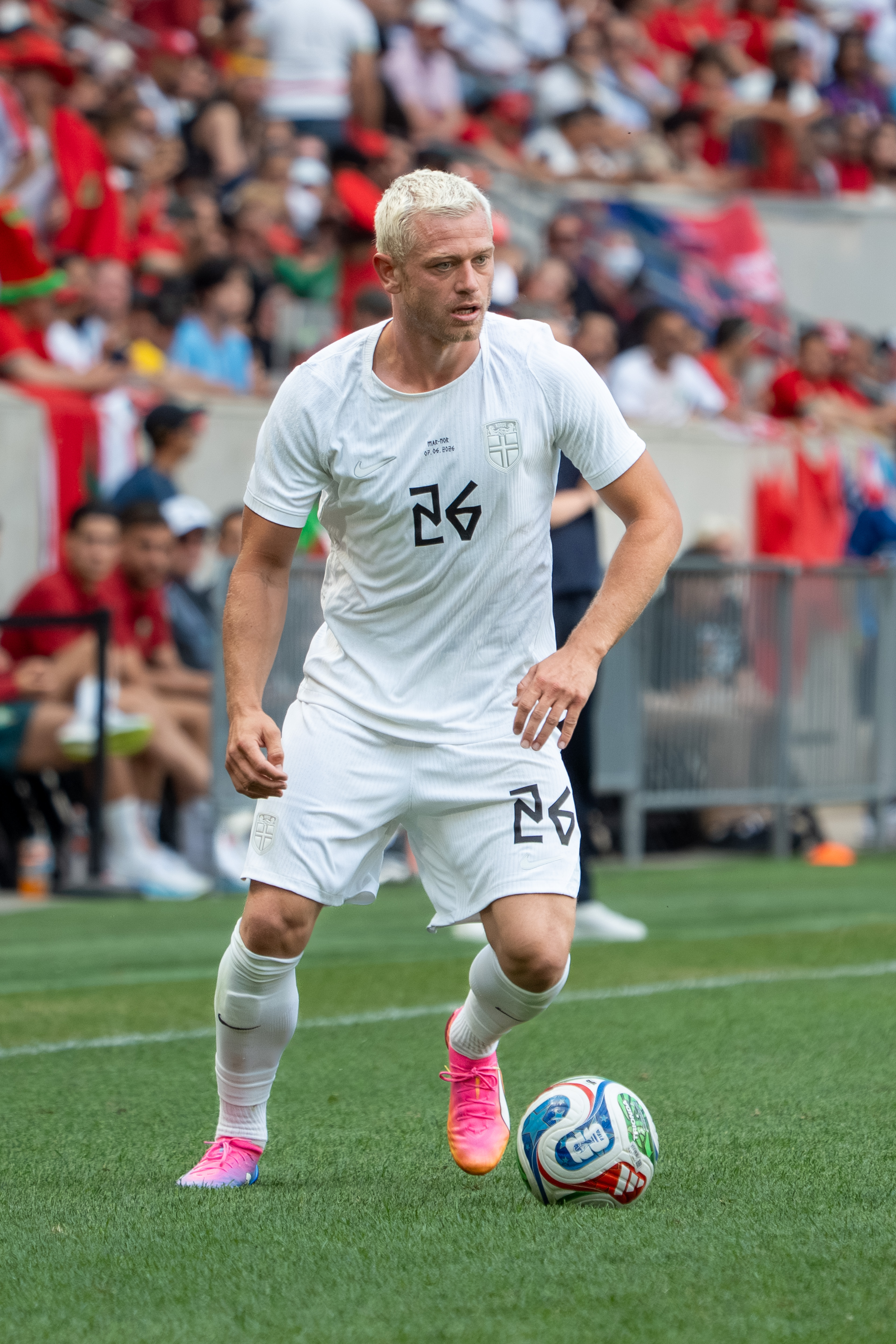
Ryerson playing for Norway in 2026

Ryerson was capped for Norway's U-18, U-19 and U-21 national teams. On 18 November 2020, he debuted for the Norwegian senior squad under coach Leif Gunnar Smerud in a 1–1 away draw against Austria during the UEFA Nations League.

On 21 May 2026, Ryerson was included in the 26-man squad selected by Norway national team manager Ståle Solbakken for the 2026 FIFA World Cup.

== Personal life ==
Ryerson's father was born in Brooklyn in the United States, and his mother was born in Norway. Ryerson held a US passport until he rescinded it in the early 2020s. He is a cousin to Norwegian football player Mathias Rasmussen.

== Career ==
=== Club ===
As of match played 31 October 2026

Appearances and goals by club, season and competition
Club	Season	League			National cup (Note: Includes Norwegian Cup, DFB-Pokal)		Europe		Other		Total	
Club	Season	Division	Apps	Goals	Apps	Goals	Apps	Goals	Apps	Goals	Apps	Goals
Viking	2015	Eliteserien	2	0	0	0	–		–		2	0
Viking	2016	Eliteserien	18	1	1	0	–		–		19	1
Viking	2017	Eliteserien	28	3	0	0	–		–		28	3
Viking	2018	1. divisjon	15	3	1	0	–		–		16	3
Viking	Total		63	7	2	0	–		–		65	7
Union Berlin	2018–19	2. Bundesliga	8	0	0	0	–		–		8	0
Union Berlin	2019–20	Bundesliga	14	0	3	0	–		–		17	0
Union Berlin	2020–21	Bundesliga	24	0	2	0	–		–		26	0
Union Berlin	2021–22	Bundesliga	28	2	3	0	5 (Note: Appearances in UEFA Europa Conference League)	1	–		36	3
Union Berlin	2022–23	Bundesliga	13	0	2	0	6 (Note: Appearances in UEFA Europa League)	0	–		21	0
Union Berlin	Total		87	2	10	0	11	1	–		108	3
Borussia Dortmund	2022–23	Bundesliga	17	1	2	0	1 (Note: Appearance(s) in UEFA Champions League)	0	–		20	1
Borussia Dortmund	2023–24	Bundesliga	21	4	3	0	10	0	–		34	4
Borussia Dortmund	2024–25	Bundesliga	29	2	1	0	12	0	5 (Note: Appearances in FIFA Club World Cup)	0	47	2
Borussia Dortmund	2025–26	Bundesliga	31	0	2	0	9	0	–		42	0
Borussia Dortmund	2026–27	Bundesliga	7	0	2	0	3	0	1 (Note: Appearance in Franz Beckenbauer Supercup)	0	13	0
Borussia Dortmund	Total		105	7	10	0	35	0	6	0	156	7
Career total			254	16	22	0	46	1	6	0	329	17

=== International ===
As of match played 17 November 2026

Appearances and goals by national team and year
National team	Year	Apps	Goals
Norway	2020	1	0
Norway	2021	6	0
Norway	2022	8	0
Norway	2023	7	0
Norway	2024	8	0
Norway	2025	9	1
Norway	2026	13	0
Total		52	1

Norway score listed first, score column indicates score after each Ryerson goal

List of international goals scored by Julian Ryerson
No.	Date	Venue	Cap	Opponent	Score	Result	Competition
1	22 March 2025	Zimbru Stadium, Chișinău, Moldova	31	Moldova	1–0	5–0	2026 FIFA World Cup qualification
