= Marvin Friedrich =

German footballer (born 1995)

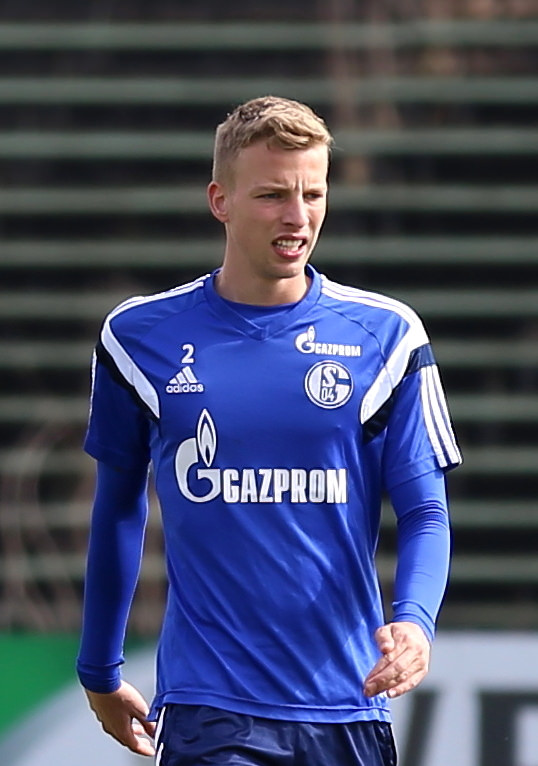
- Friedrich in training for Schalke 04 in 2015

Personal information
- Date of birth: 13 December 1995 (age 30)
- Place of birth: Kassel, Germany
- Height: 1.93 m (6 ft 4 in)
- Position: Centre back

Team information
- Current team: Union Berlin
- Number: 5

Youth career
- 2002–2008: FSC Guxhagen
- 2008–2010: OSC Vellmar
- 2010–2011: SC Paderborn
- 2011–2014: Schalke 04

Senior career*
Years	Team	Apps	(Gls)
2014–2016	Schalke 04 II	35	(4)
2014–2016	Schalke 04	7	(0)
2016–2018	FC Augsburg II	26	(0)
2018–2022	Union Berlin	124	(8)
2022–2026	Borussia Mönchengladbach	83	(1)
2026–	Union Berlin	1	(0)

International career
2014	Germany U19	3	(1)
2015–2016	Germany U20	4	(0)
Medal record
Representing Germany
Germany U19
Winner	UEFA U-19 Championship	2014
- * Club domestic league appearances and goals as of 1 November 2026

Marvin Friedrich (German pronunciation: [ˈmaːʀˈvɪn ˈfʁiːdʁɪç]; born 13 December 1995) is a German professional footballer who plays as a centre back for Bundesliga club Union Berlin.

== Club career ==
In 2011, Friedrich joined the Schalke 04's youth academy. He made his Bundesliga debut on 13 September 2014 against Borussia Mönchengladbach in a 4–1 away defeat.

On 17 June 2016, it was announced that Friedrich had joined FC Augsburg on a three-year deal.

In January 2018, Friedrich moved to 2. Bundesliga side Union Berlin on a 2 1/2-year contract until summer 2021. Augsburg secured an option re-sign Friedrich and, in May 2019, it was announced that FC Augsburg had redeemed the buy-back option for €1 million only to sell him back to Union Berlin for financial aspects. On 5 July 2019, Friedrich returned to Union Berlin in a permanent deal on a three-year contract for €2.5 million.

On 11 January 2022, Friedrich signed for Borussia Mönchengladbach.

On 10 June 2026, Friedrich returned to Union Berlin.

== International career ==
Friedrich made his debut for the Germany u19 team on 16 April 2014 in a 5–2 win over the Belgium u19 team in which Friedrich came on in the 60th minute for Anthony Syhre and within six minutes Friedrich celebrated his debut goal for the Germany u19 team. Friedrich was in the Germany U19 team for the 2014 UEFA European Under-19 Championship in Hungary and made two brief appearances. After a 1–0 win over Portugal u19 team in the final, Friedrich became European champion.

== Style of play ==
Friedrich is a defender, primarily deployed in the defensive positions of centre-back and right-back or left-back. He is technically and physically similar to Benedikt Höwedes.

== Career statistics ==
As of match played 1 November 2026

Appearances and goals by club, season and competition
Club	Season	League			Cup		Europe		Other		Total	
Club	Season	Division	Apps	Goals	Apps	Goals	Apps	Goals	Apps	Goals	Apps	Goals
Schalke 04 II	2014–15	Regionalliga West	20	3	—		—		—		20	3
Schalke 04 II	2015–16	Regionalliga West	15	1	—		—		—		15	1
Schalke 04 II	Total		35	4	—		—		—		35	4
Schalke 04	2014–15	Bundesliga	5	0	0	0	1 (Note: Appearance in UEFA Champions League)	0	—		6	0
Schalke 04	2015–16	Bundesliga	2	0	0	0	1 (Note: Appearance in UEFA Europa League)	0	—		3	0
Schalke 04	Total		7	0	0	0	2	0	—		9	0
FC Augsburg II	2016–17	Regionalliga Bayern	13	0	—		—		—		13	0
FC Augsburg II	2017–18	Regionalliga Bayern	13	0	—		—		—		13	0
FC Augsburg II	Total		26	0	—		—		–		26	0
Union Berlin	2017–18	2. Bundesliga	12	1	0	0	—		—		12	1
Union Berlin	2018–19	2. Bundesliga	34	0	2	0	—		2 (Note: Appearances in Bundesliga promotion play-offs)	1	38	1
Union Berlin	2019–20	Bundesliga	31	2	3	0	—		—		34	2
Union Berlin	2020–21	Bundesliga	34	5	2	0	—		—		36	5
Union Berlin	2021–22	Bundesliga	13	0	1	0	7 (Note: Appearances in UEFA Europa Conference League)	0	—		21	0
Union Berlin	Total		124	8	8	0	7	0	2	1	141	9
Borussia Mönchengladbach	2021–22	Bundesliga	8	0	1	0	—		—		9	0
Borussia Mönchengladbach	2022–23	Bundesliga	23	1	1	0	—		—		24	1
Borussia Mönchengladbach	2023–24	Bundesliga	24	0	3	0	—		—		27	0
Borussia Mönchengladbach	2024–25	Bundesliga	22	0	2	0	—		—		24	0
Borussia Mönchengladbach	2025–26	Bundesliga	6	0	1	0	—		—		7	0
Borussia Mönchengladbach	Total		83	1	8	0	—		—		91	1
Union Berlin	2026–27	Bundesliga	1	0	0	0	—		—		1	0
Career total			276	13	16	0	9	0	2	1	303	14
