= Marcus Ingvartsen =

Danish footballer (born 1996)

- Ingvartsen with San Diego FC in 2026

Personal information
- Full name: Marcus Højriis Ingvartsen
- Date of birth: 4 January 1996 (age 30)
- Place of birth: Farum, Denmark
- Height: 1.86 m (6 ft 1 in)
- Position: Forward

Team information
- Current team: San Diego FC
- Number: 7

Youth career
- 2001–2012: Farum

Senior career*
Years	Team	Apps	(Gls)
2012–2017	Nordsjælland	74	(30)
2017–2019	Genk	29	(5)
2019–2022	Union Berlin	60	(8)
2021–2022	→ Mainz 05 (loan)	26	(6)
2022–2023	Mainz 05	28	(10)
2023–2024	Nordsjælland	45	(14)
2025–	San Diego FC	26	(13)

International career^{‡}
2011–2012	Denmark U16	5	(0)
2012–2013	Denmark U17	4	(0)
2014–2015	Denmark U19	6	(2)
2015–2019	Denmark U21	28	(17)
2021	Denmark	1	(1)
- * Club domestic league appearances and goals as of 2 August 2026 ‡ National team caps and goals as of 28 June 2021

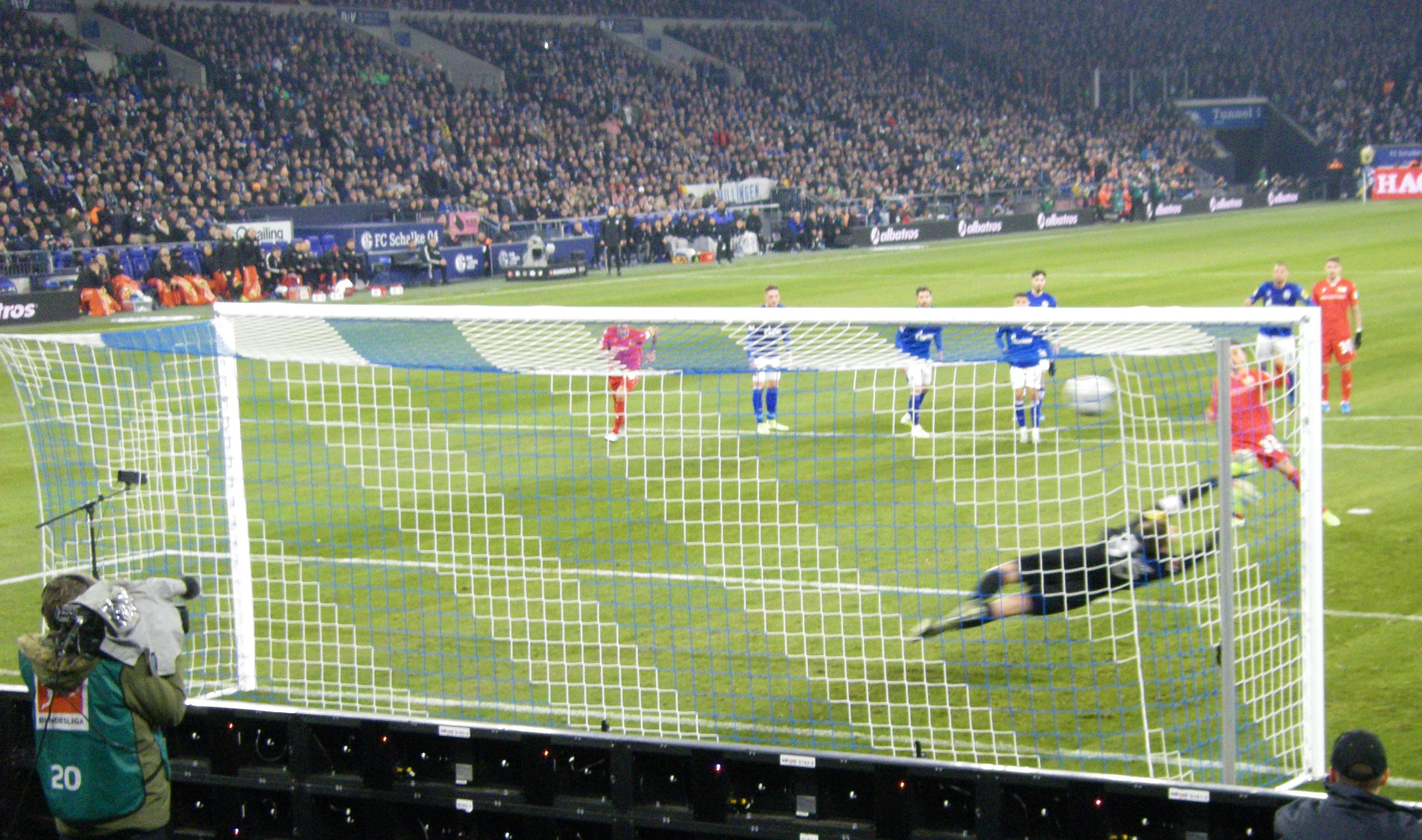
A penalty being scored by Marcus Ingvartsen against Alexander Nübel, FC Schalke

Marcus Højriis Ingvartsen (born 4 January 1996) is a Danish professional footballer who plays as a forward for Major League Soccer club San Diego FC. He is a former Denmark international.

== Club career ==
=== Nordsjælland ===
Ingvartsen started his career in his native Denmark for Superliga and hometown side FC Nordsjælland. He finished the 2016–17 Danish Superliga season as the top scorer in the league with 23 league goals; finishing 3 goals ahead of second player on the list, Teemu Pukki. Ingvartsen also won the Young Players of the Year award for that season, as a result of his impressive league performances. He also won the league's player of the month award for both November and April during the season. He went on to score 30 goals in 76 matches for Nordsjælland.

=== Genk ===
After his standout season, Belgian club Genk signed Ingvartsen during the summer of 2017. Ingvartsen started his first season with Genk with a few late substitute appearances for them. But in his first full game for Genk, Ingvartsen scored twice against Eupen to earn Genk a 3–3 draw. Ingvartsen scored again in Genk's next league game against Mouscron. Ingvartsen scored more league goals against Kortrijk and Oostende, before suffering a serious knee injury in early 2018 which ended his season. Before his injury, Ingvartsen had played a key role in getting Genk to the final of the Belgian Cup. He equalised against Mechelen in the seventh minute to earn a 1–1 draw and he scored again when the game went to a penalty shoot out, which Genk won. Ingvartsen scored again in Genk's quarter-final penalty shootout win over Waasland-Beveren. In Genk's semi-final match against Kortrijk, Ingvartsen scored the opening goal of the match, which helped Genk reach the final. Genk lost 1–0 to Standard Liège in the final of the Belgian Cup on 17 March 2018.

Ingvartsen was injured at the start of the 2018–19 season and missed the early part of the league campaign. When he returned from injury, he helped Genk win the Belgian First Division league title.

=== Union Berlin ===
In June 2019, Ingvartsen signed for newly promoted Bundesliga side Union Berlin on a three-year deal. He made his debut for the club on 11 August in the 6–0 away win over VfB Germania Halberstadt in the second round of the DFB-Pokal.

=== Mainz 05 ===
On 30 August 2021, after the third matchday of the 2021–22 Bundesliga season, Ingvartsen was sent on loan to league rivals Mainz 05 with a purchase option until the end of the season. In his debut on 11 September, he scored the 2–0 goal in the away game at Hoffenheim one minute after being substituted on. During his loan period with Mainz, Ingvartsen contributed with 6 goals in 664 minutes of playing time in the league.

On 17 May 2022, Mainz made the transfer permanent and Ingvartsen signed a contract until 2025.

=== Return to Nordsjælland ===
On 7 July 2023, Ingvartsen re-joined FC Nordsjælland on a contract of undisclosed length.

=== San Diego FC ===
On 19 March 2024, MLS expansion team San Diego FC announced that Ingvartsen would join the club ahead of their 2025 inaugural season, signing a three-year contract through 2027, with club options for two more seasons, set to be activated on 1 January 2025.

== International career ==
Ingvartsen is the all-time leading goalscorer for the Danish U21 national team. He surpassed Peter Møller on the all-time list to reach 17 goals thanks to his goal against the England U-21 national team.

He was called up to the senior Denmark squad in March 2021. He made his debut on 28 March 2021 in a World Cup qualifier against Moldova and scored the last goal in a 8–0 victory.

== Career statistics ==
=== Club ===
As of match played 2 December 2024

Appearances and goals by club, season and competition
Club	Season	League			National cup (Note: Includes Danish Cup, Belgian Cup, DFB-Pokal)		Continental		Other		Total	
Club	Season	Division	Apps	Goals	Apps	Goals	Apps	Goals	Apps	Goals	Apps	Goals
FC Nordsjælland	2013–14	Danish Superliga	2	0	0	0	–		–		2	0
FC Nordsjælland	2014–15	Danish Superliga	14	2	0	0	–		–		14	2
FC Nordsjælland	2015–16	Danish Superliga	23	5	1	0	–		–		24	5
FC Nordsjælland	2016–17	Danish Superliga	35	23	1	0	–		–		36	23
FC Nordsjælland	Total		74	30	2	0	–		–		76	30
Genk	2017–18	Belgian First Division A	22	5	5	2	–		–		27	7
Genk	2018–19	Belgian First Division A	8	0	1	1	2 (Note: Appearances in UEFA Europa League)	0	–		11	1
Genk	Total		30	5	6	3	2	0	–		38	8
Union Berlin	2019–20	Bundesliga	28	5	4	1	–		–		32	6
Union Berlin	2020–21	Bundesliga	30	3	1	0	–		–		31	3
Union Berlin	2021–22	Bundesliga	2	0	1	0	2 (Note: Appearances in UEFA Europa Conference League)	0	–		5	0
Union Berlin	Total		60	8	6	1	2	0	–		68	9
Mainz 05 (loan)	2021–22	Bundesliga	26	6	1	1	–		–		27	7
Mainz 05	2022–23	Bundesliga	28	10	3	2	–		–		31	12
Nordsjælland	2023–24	Danish Superliga	28	9	4	0	8	6	–		36	15
Nordsjælland	2024–25	Danish Superliga	17	5	2	3	—		–		19	8
Nordsjælland	Total		45	14	6	3	8	6	–		55	23
San Diego	2025	Major League Soccer	0	0	–		–		0	0	0	0
Career total			263	73	24	10	12	6	0	0	299	89

=== International ===
As of match played 28 March 2021

Appearances and goals by national team and year
National team	Year	Apps	Goals
Denmark	2021	1	1
Total		1	1

Scores and results list Denmark's goal tally first.

No.	Date	Venue	Opponent	Score	Result	Competition
1.	28 March 2021	MCH Arena, Herning, Denmark	Moldova	8–0	8–0	2022 FIFA World Cup qualification

== Honours ==
Genk

- Belgian First Division A: 2018–19
- Belgian Cup runner-up: 2017–18

Individual

- Danish Superliga Player of the Month: November 2016, April 2017
- Danish Young Player of the Year: 2016
- Danish Superliga Top Scorer: 2016–17
- Tipsbladet Player of the Spring: 2017
