= Jakob Busk =

Danish footballer (born 1993)

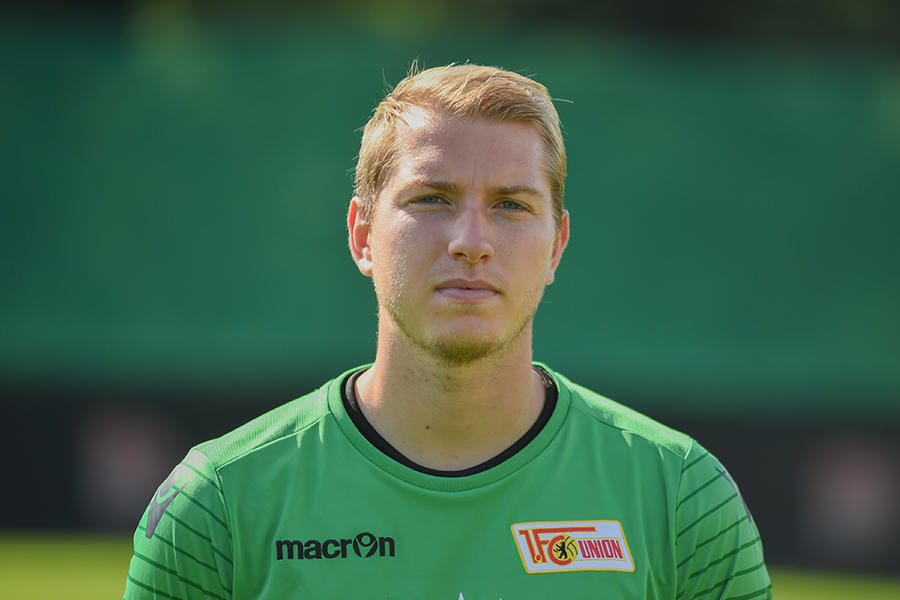
- Busk with Union Berlin in 2016

Personal information
- Date of birth: 12 September 1993 (age 33)
- Place of birth: Copenhagen, Denmark
- Height: 1.89 m (6 ft 2 in)
- Position: Goalkeeper

Team information
- Current team: Nordsjælland
- Number: 16

Youth career
- Copenhagen

Senior career*
Years	Team	Apps	(Gls)
2012–2016	Copenhagen	4	(0)
2014	→ AC Horsens (loan)	17	(0)
2015	→ Sandefjord (loan)	13	(0)
2016–2024	Union Berlin	56	(0)
2024–2025	Sønderjyske	14	(0)
2025	→ TSG Hoffenheim (loan)	0	(0)
2025–	Nordsjælland	0	(0)

International career
2011	Denmark U18	4	(0)
2011	Denmark U20	11	(0)
2011–2012	Denmark U19	5	(0)
2013–2015	Denmark U21	17	(0)
- * Club domestic league appearances and goals as of 17 May 2025

Jakob Busk Jensen (born 12 September 1993) is a Danish footballer who plays as goalkeeper for Danish Superliga club FC Nordsjælland.

== Club career ==
=== Denmark ===
Having played in their youth side for four years, Busk was promoted to the first team of F.C. Copenhagen during the 2012–13 season. He gained his first Superliga game on 16 May 2013, an away match against Randers FC. In the Autumn of 2014, Busk was sent out on loan to fellow Superliga club AC Horsens, and the following year had a spell with Sandefjord.

=== Union Berlin ===
Busk moved to German 2. Bundesliga side Union Berlin in January 2016.

=== Sønderjyske ===
On 14 May 2024, newly promoted Sønderjyske announced the signing of Busk from 1 July 2024. He signed a two-year contract.

Busk made his debut for Sønderjyske on 11 August, coming on in the first half for the injured starter Nicolai Flø during a 2–0 league loss to his former club, Copenhagen. This was Busk's first competitive appearance in over six years, with his last game being on 7 April 2018 for Union Berlin.

=== Loan at Hoffenheim ===
On 1 February 2025, German Bundesliga side TSG Hoffenheim confirmed that they had signed Busk on a season-long loan deal to replace the club's goalkeeper, Oliver Baumann, who had suffered a serious injury.

=== FC Nordsjælland ===
On 15 July 2025, Busk joined Danish Superliga club FC Nordsjælland. However, the club did not disclose the length of the contract.

== Career statistics ==
As of match played 11 August 2024

Appearances and goals by club, season and competition
Club	Season	League			Cup		Europe		Other		Total	
Club	Season	Division	Apps	Goals	Apps	Goals	Apps	Goals	Apps	Goals	Apps	Goals
Copenhagen	2012–13	Danish Superliga	1	0	0	0	0	0	—		1	0
Copenhagen	2013–14	Danish Superliga	3	0	3	0	0	0	—		6	0
Copenhagen	Total		4	0	3	0	0	0	—		7	0
Horsens (loan)	2014–15	Danish 1st Division	17	0	1	0	—		—		18	0
Sandefjord (loan)	2015	Tippeligaen	14	0	1	0	—		—		15	0
Union Berlin	2015–16	2. Bundesliga	14	0	—		—		—		14	0
Union Berlin	2016–17	2. Bundesliga	22	0	1	0	—		—		23	0
Union Berlin	2017–18	2. Bundesliga	20	0	0	0	—		—		20	0
Union Berlin	2018–19	2. Bundesliga	0	0	0	0	—		0	0	0	0
Union Berlin	2019–20	Bundesliga	0	0	0	0	—		—		0	0
Union Berlin	2020–21	Bundesliga	0	0	0	0	—		—		0	0
Union Berlin	2021–22	Bundesliga	0	0	0	0	0	0	—		0	0
Union Berlin	2022–23	Bundesliga	0	0	0	0	0	0	—		0	0
Union Berlin	2023–24	Bundesliga	0	0	0	0	0	0	—		0	0
Union Berlin	Total		56	0	1	0	0	0	0	0	57	0
Sønderjyske	2024–25	Danish Superliga	1	0	—		—		—		1	0
Career total			92	0	6	0	0	0	0	0	98	0

== Honours ==
- Danish Superliga: 2012–13
