= Taiwo Awoniyi =

Nigerian footballer (born 1997)

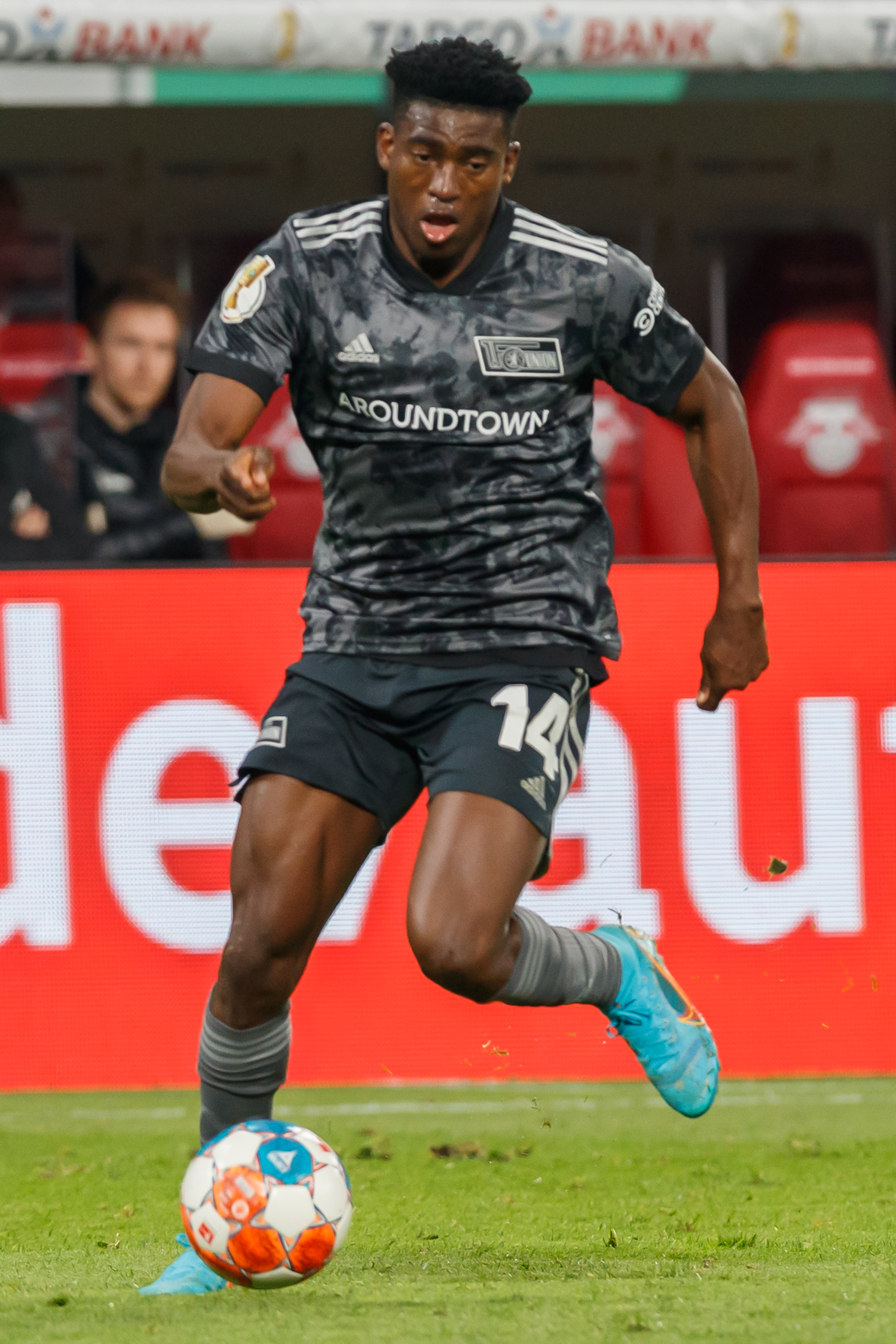
- Awoniyi playing for Union Berlin in 2022

Personal information
- Full name: Taiwo Micheal Awoniyi
- Date of birth: 12 August 1997 (age 29)
- Place of birth: Ilorin, Nigeria
- Height: 1.83 m (6 ft 0 in)
- Position: Striker

Team information
- Current team: Coventry City
- Number: 14

Youth career
- 2010–2015: Imperial Soccer Academy

Senior career*
Years	Team	Apps	(Gls)
2015–2021	Liverpool	0	(0)
2015–2016	→ FSV Frankfurt (loan)	13	(1)
2016–2017	→ NEC (loan)	18	(2)
2017–2018	→ Mouscron (loan)	27	(7)
2018–2019	→ Gent (loan)	16	(0)
2019	→ Mouscron (loan)	9	(7)
2019–2020	→ Mainz 05 (loan)	12	(1)
2020–2021	→ Union Berlin (loan)	21	(5)
2021–2022	Union Berlin	31	(15)
2022–2026	Nottingham Forest	90	(21)
2026–	Coventry City	9	(3)

International career^{‡}
2013	Nigeria U17	8	(4)
2015	Nigeria U20	9	(7)
2015	Nigeria U23	3	(2)
2021–	Nigeria	13	(2)
Medal record
Men's football
Representing Nigeria
FIFA U-17 World Cup
Winner	2013
African U-20 Championship
Winner	2015
- * Club domestic league appearances and goals as of 23:23, 21 November 2026 (UTC) ‡ National team caps and goals as of 23:35, 17 November 2026 (UTC)

Taiwo Micheal Awoniyi (born 12 August 1997) is a Nigerian professional footballer who plays as a striker for Premier League club Coventry City and the Nigeria national team.

== Club career ==
=== Early career ===
In 2010, Awoniyi was voted the Most Valuable Player at a Coca-Cola football competition in London. His performance at the competition was spotted by Seyi Olofinjana who invited him to join the Imperial Soccer Academy.

=== Liverpool ===
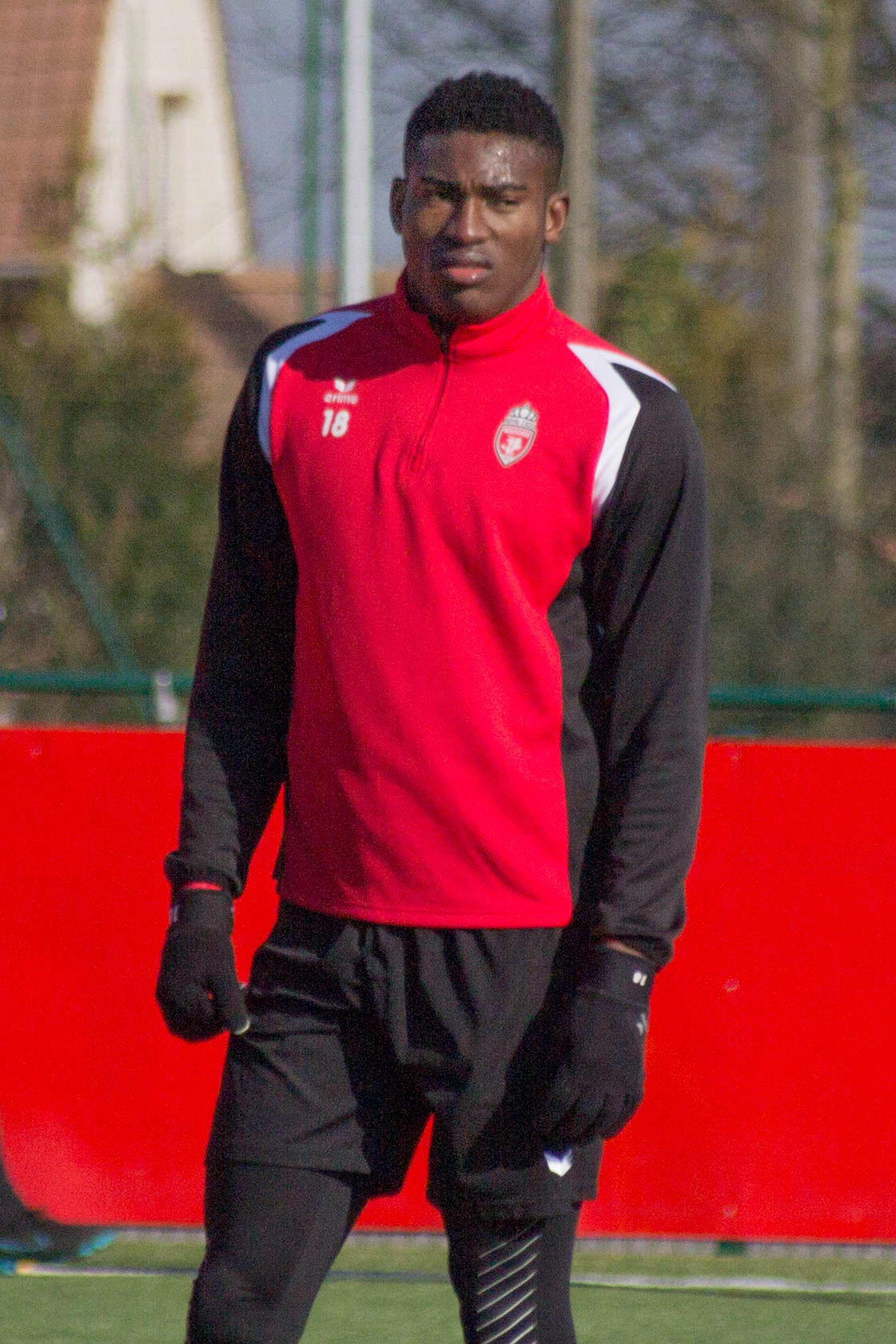
Awoniyi training with Mouscron in 2018

On 31 August 2015, Awoniyi signed for English club Liverpool for a fee of around £400,000 but was immediately loaned out to German team FSV Frankfurt.

==== Loans to FSV Frankfurt and NEC ====
Awoniyi made his debut for Frankfurt as a late substitute in a German Cup match against Hertha Berlin. After being named as a substitute for six league matches, he made his debut on 19 February 2016, playing 89 minutes against FC St. Pauli. Awoniyi suffered relegation with Frankfurt, and he returned to Liverpool at the end of the season.

On 26 August 2016, Dutch team NEC confirmed that Awoniyi had joined them on a season-long loan and was expected to join the squad the following week after the formalities of his work permit were completed. On 10 September, he made his Eredivisie debut in a 4–0 defeat of NEC to PSV Eindhoven, being replaced in the 72nd minute by Michael Heinloth. With NEC, the Nigerian suffered his second consecutive relegation, being relegated from Eredivisie in 2017.

==== Loans to Mouscron and Gent ====
In July 2017, Awoniyi left NEC and joined Belgian club Royal Excel Mouscron on a season-long loan, and made his debut on 12 August when he started the match against KSC Lokeren, scoring within 22 minutes.

On 17 July 2018, Awoniyi signed a new long-term deal with Liverpool, and on 23 July sealed a season-long loan to another Belgian club, Gent. On 11 January 2019, it was announced that his loan to Gent was cut short, and Awoniyi was loaned to Mouscron again. In April he said that his struggle to get a UK work permit could end his Liverpool career.

==== Loans to Mainz 05 and Union Berlin ====
On 6 August 2019, Liverpool confirmed Awoniyi had joined Bundesliga side Mainz 05 on a season-long loan. He was hospitalised in June 2020, after sustaining a severe concussion during a 1–0 loss to FC Augsburg in the league.

On 19 September 2020, Awoniyi left for his seventh loan spell, this time joining Bundesliga side Union Berlin for a year.

=== Union Berlin ===
On 20 July 2021, Awoniyi rejoined Union Berlin, this time on a permanent basis. The German club reportedly paid £6.5 million for the forward. Liverpool negotiated a 10% sell-on clause in this deal.

=== Nottingham Forest ===
On 25 June 2022, Awoniyi completed a move to newly promoted Premier League side Nottingham Forest on a five-year deal. The transfer fee paid was a club record for Forest, reportedly £17 million. On 14 August 2022, he scored his first Premier League goal in a 1–0 win against West Ham United. On 22 October 2022, he scored the winning goal in a 1–0 home victory against former club Liverpool. Towards the end of the season he scored six goals in four games, including the winner in a 1–0 home win over Arsenal on 20 May 2023 that preserved the club's Premier League status.

On 18 August 2023, Awoniyi became the first Forest player to score in six consecutive Premier League matches since Stan Collymore in March–April 1995.

On 11 May 2025, Awoniyi suffered a serious abdominal injury during a game against Leicester City. Two days later, on 13 May 2025, the club announced that Awoniyi had been placed in an induced coma and was recovering in the ICU following urgent surgery. On 15 May he was announced to be out of the coma and in recovery.

Awoniyi returned to the side on 18 October, playing 45 minutes in a 3–0 loss at home to Chelsea. On 25 January 2026, Awoniyi scored the second in a 0–2 win away to Brentford, his first Premier League goal in over a year and first since his abdominal injury.

=== Coventry City ===
On 17 August 2026, Awoniyi signed for Premier League club Coventry City for a reported fee of £9 million.

== International career ==
Awoniyi represented Nigeria at the 2013 FIFA U-17 World Cup and went on to win the tournament, scoring four goals during the competition. He also represented Nigeria at the 2015 FIFA U-20 World Cup in New Zealand after winning the 2015 African U-20 Championship in Senegal.

On 12 April 2015, Awoniyi scored a brace on his debut for the Nigeria under-23 team in a match against Zambia, as his team went on to qualify for the 2015 All African Games.

Awoniyi was selected by Nigeria for their 35-man provisional squad for the 2016 Summer Olympics.

Awoniyi was selected by Gernot Rohr in late 2021 to represent Nigeria during the side's 2022 FIFA World Cup qualifiers, making his senior debut in their 1–0 loss to the Central African Republic. Awoniyi was then selected to represent Nigeria at the 2021 Africa Cup of Nations, where he led the line for his country throughout the tournament. His only goal during the tournament came in a 3–1 group stage win against Sudan.

== Style of play ==
Parallels have been drawn between Awoniyi's style of play, and that of Rashidi Yekini, Nigeria's all-time highest goalscorer.

== Personal life ==
Awoniyi has a younger twin sister called Kehinde. He married his partner Taiye Jesudun in an engagement and traditional wedding in Kabba on 15 June 2018, followed by a white wedding on 16 June in Ilorin. Awoniyi is a Christian.

== Career statistics ==
=== Club ===
As of match played 21 November 2026

Appearances and goals by club, season and competition
Club	Season	League			National cup (Note: Includes DFB-Pokal, KNVB Cup, Belgian Cup, FA Cup)		League cup (Note: Includes EFL Cup)		Europe		Other		Total	
Club	Season	Division	Apps	Goals	Apps	Goals	Apps	Goals	Apps	Goals	Apps	Goals	Apps	Goals
FSV Frankfurt (loan)	2015–16	2. Bundesliga	13	1	1	0	—		—		—		14	1
NEC (loan)	2016–17	Eredivisie	18	2	1	0	—		—		3 (Note: Appearances in Eredivisie relegation play-offs)	1	22	3
Mouscron (loan)	2017–18	Belgian Pro League	27	7	2	1	—		—		2 (Note: Appearances in Belgian Pro League Europa League play-offs)	2	31	10
Gent (loan)	2018–19	Belgian Pro League	16	0	2	2	—		4 (Note: Appearances in UEFA Europa League)	1	—		22	3
Mouscron (loan)	2018–19	Belgian Pro League	9	7	—		—		—		7	4	16	11
Mainz 05 (loan)	2019–20	Bundesliga	12	1	0	0	—		—		—		12	1
Union Berlin (loan)	2020–21	Bundesliga	21	5	1	0	—		—		—		22	5
Union Berlin	2021–22	Bundesliga	31	15	4	1	—		8 (Note: Appearances in UEFA Europa Conference League)	4	—		43	20
Nottingham Forest	2022–23	Premier League	27	10	0	0	3	1	—		—		30	11
Nottingham Forest	2023–24	Premier League	20	6	2	0	1	0	—		—		23	6
Nottingham Forest	2024–25	Premier League	26	1	5	1	1	0	—		—		32	2
Nottingham Forest	2025–26	Premier League	17	4	1	0	0	0	0	0	—		18	4
Nottingham Forest	Total		90	21	8	1	5	1	0	0	—		103	23
Coventry City	2026–27	Premier League	9	3	0	0	1	1	—		—		10	4
Career total			246	61	19	5	6	2	12	5	12	7	295	80

=== International ===
As of match played 17 November 2026

Appearances and goals by national team and year
National team	Year	Apps	Goals
Nigeria	2021	1	0
Nigeria	2022	4	1
Nigeria	2023	5	1
Nigeria	2026	3	0
Total		13	2

Scores and results list Nigeria's goal tally first, score column indicates score after each Awoniyi goal.

List of international goals scored by Taiwo Awoniyi
No.	Date	Venue	Opponent	Score	Result	Competition
1	15 January 2022	Roumdé Adjia Stadium, Garoua, Cameroon	Sudan	2–0	3–1	2021 Africa Cup of Nations
2	10 September 2023	Godswill Akpabio International Stadium, Uyo, Nigeria	São Tomé and Príncipe	3–0	6–0	2023 Africa Cup of Nations qualification

== Honours ==
Nigeria U17

- FIFA U-17 World Cup: 2013

Nigeria U20

- African U-20 Championship: 2015

Individual

- African U-20 Championship Team of the Tournament: 2015
