= Grischa Prömel =

German footballer

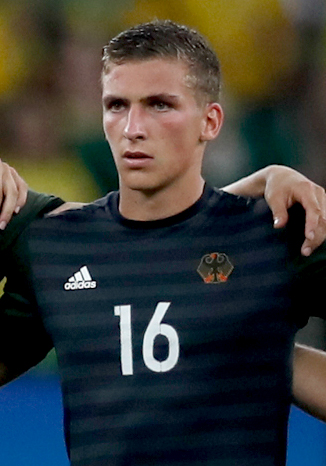
- Prömel at the 2016 Olympics

Personal information
- Date of birth: 9 January 1995 (age 31)
- Place of birth: Stuttgart, Germany
- Height: 1.84 m (6 ft 0 in)
- Position: Midfielder

Team information
- Current team: VfB Stuttgart
- Number: 21

Youth career
- 2012–2013: Stuttgarter Kickers
- 2013–2014: TSG Hoffenheim

Senior career*
Years	Team	Apps	(Gls)
2014–2015	TSG Hoffenheim II	24	(5)
2015–2017	Karlsruher SC	44	(2)
2017–2022	Union Berlin	123	(19)
2022–2026	TSG Hoffenheim	81	(12)
2026–	VfB Stuttgart	8	(1)

International career^{‡}
2016	Germany Olympic	4	(0)
2016	Germany U21	3	(1)
Medal record
Olympic Games
Silver medal – second place	2016 Rio de Janeiro	Team
- * Club domestic league appearances and goals as of 31 October 2026 ‡ National team caps and goals as of 11 October 2016

Grischa Prömel (born 9 January 1995) is a German footballer who plays as a midfielder for Bundesliga club VfB Stuttgart.

== Club career ==
Prömel began his professional career with Karlsruher SC having joined them from TSG Hoffenheim's second team in 2015. In June 2017, after playing more than 40 times, Prömel left Karlsruher SC following their relegation from 2. Bundesliga and signed a three-year contract with 1. FC Union Berlin. He was sent off via a straight red card late on in his second game for his new club against Nuremberg which resulted in a two-match suspension.

On 1 July 2022, Prömel returned to TSG Hoffenheim on a free transfer. On 25 May 2026, VfB Stuttgart announced the signing of him on a contract until 2029.

== International career ==
He was part of the squad for the 2016 Summer Olympics, where Germany won the silver medal.

Prömel was called for the first time with the Germany national team for the friendly matches against Turkey and Austria on 18 and 21 November 2023, respectively.

== Career statistics ==
As of match played 3 November 2026

Appearances and goals by club, season and competition
Club	Season	League			National cup		Continental		Other		Total	
Club	Season	Division	Apps	Goals	Apps	Goals	Apps	Goals	Apps	Goals	Apps	Goals
1899 Hoffenheim	2014–15	Bundesliga	0	0	0	0	0	0	—		0	0
TSG Hoffenheim II	2014–15	Regionalliga Südwest	23	5	—		—		—		23	5
TSG Hoffenheim II	2015–16	Regionalliga Südwest	1	0	—		—		—		1	0
TSG Hoffenheim II	Total		24	5	—		—		—		24	5
Karlsruher SC	2015–16	2. Bundesliga	21	2	0	0	—		—		21	2
Karlsruher SC	2016–17	2. Bundesliga	23	0	0	0	—		—		23	0
Karlsruher SC	Total		44	2	0	0	—		—		44	0
Union Berlin	2017–18	2. Bundesliga	23	1	1	0	—		—		24	1
Union Berlin	2018–19	2. Bundesliga	29	7	2	0	—		2 (Note: Appearances in Promotion play-offs)	0	33	7
Union Berlin	2019–20	Bundesliga	16	0	3	0	—		—		19	0
Union Berlin	2020–21	Bundesliga	24	3	2	1	—		—		26	4
Union Berlin	2021–22	Bundesliga	29	8	4	0	6 (Note: Appearances in UEFA Conference League)	0	—		39	8
Union Berlin	Total		121	19	12	1	6	0	2	0	141	20
TSG Hoffenheim II	2022–23	Regionalliga Südwest	1	0	—		—		—		1	0
1899 Hoffenheim	2022–23	Bundesliga	18	1	2	1	—		—		20	2
1899 Hoffenheim	2023–24	Bundesliga	27	4	2	0	—		—		29	4
1899 Hoffenheim	2024–25	Bundesliga	3	0	1	0	0	0	—		4	0
1899 Hoffenheim	2025–26	Bundesliga	33	7	1	1	—		—		34	8
1899 Hoffenheim	Total		81	12	6	2	0	0	—		87	14
VfB Stuttgart	2026–27	Bundesliga	8	1	2	0	4 (Note: Appearances in UEFA Champions League)	0	—		14	1
Career total			279	39	20	3	10	0	2	0	311	42

== Honours ==
=== International ===
Germany

- Summer Olympic Games silver medal: 2016
