= Nico Hecker =

German footballer

Personal information
- Date of birth: 5 September 1991 (age 35)
- Place of birth: Chemnitz, Germany
- Height: 1.83 m (6 ft 0 in)
- Position: Midfielder

Team information
- Current team: Rot Weiss Ahlen

Youth career
- Rot Weiss Ahlen
- –2011: Preußen Münster

Senior career*
Years	Team	Apps	(Gls)
2011–2012	Rot Weiss Ahlen		
2012–2021	SC Verl	154	(18)
2022–	Rot Weiss Ahlen	0	(0)
- * Club domestic league appearances and goals as of 12:11, 23 January 2022 (UTC)

Nico Hecker (born 5 September 1991) is a German professional footballer who plays as a midfielder for Rot Weiss Ahlen.
