= Sheraldo Becker =

Surinamese footballer (born 1995)

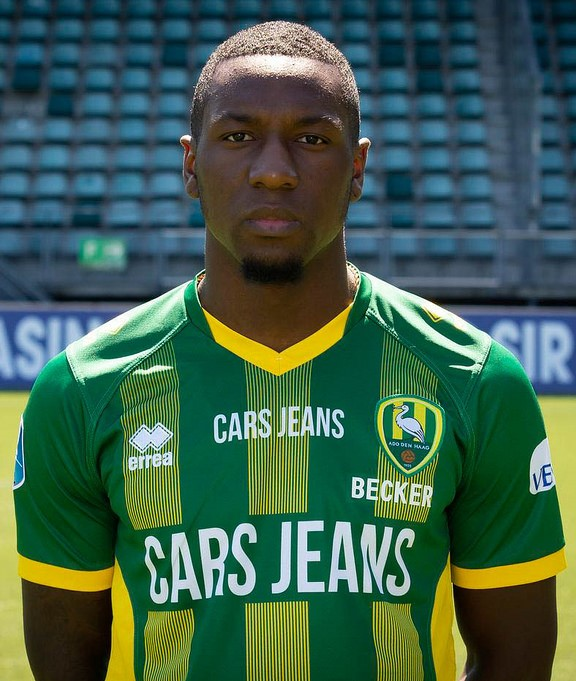
- Becker with ADO Den Haag in 2018

Personal information
- Full name: Sheraldo Rudi Salomo Willem Becker
- Date of birth: 9 February 1995 (age 31)
- Place of birth: Amsterdam, Netherlands
- Height: 1.80 m (5 ft 11 in)
- Position: Forward

Team information
- Current team: Mainz 05
- Number: 23

Youth career
- 2004–2013: Ajax

Senior career*
| Years | Team | Apps | (Gls) |
| 2013–2016 | Ajax | 0 | (0) |
| 2013–2015 | Jong Ajax | 30 | (5) |
| 2015–2016 | → PEC Zwolle (loan) | 32 | (5) |
| 2016–2019 | ADO Den Haag | 88 | (12) |
| 2019–2024 | Union Berlin | 104 | (18) |
| 2024–2025 | Real Sociedad | 37 | (4) |
| 2025–2026 | Osasuna | 9 | (0) |
| 2026 | → Mainz 05 (loan) | 13 | (3) |
| 2026– | Mainz 05 | 8 | (2) |

International career^{‡}
| 2010–2011 | Netherlands U16 | 4 | (1) |
| 2011–2012 | Netherlands U17 | 4 | (1) |
| 2012 | Netherlands U18 | 1 | (1) |
| 2014 | Netherlands U19 | 1 | (0) |
| 2014 | Netherlands U20 | 1 | (0) |
| 2021– | Suriname | 23 | (5) |
- * Club domestic league appearances and goals as of 30 October 2026 ‡ National team caps and goals as of 23:45, 26 March 2026 (UTC)

Sheraldo Rudi Salomo Willem Becker (born 9 February 1995) is a professional footballer who plays as a forward for Bundesliga club Mainz 05. Born in the Netherlands, he plays for the Suriname national team.

Becker started his professional debut at Ajax reserve team in 2013. He went on to play for PEC Zwolle and ADO Den Haag in the Eredivisie before joining a Bundesliga side, Union Berlin in 2019. After four and a half years stint at Union Berlin, he moved to Spanish club Real Sociedad in 2024.

Dutch by birth, he represented Netherlands at youth international level before switching his allegiance to Suriname national team at senior level since 2021.

== Club career ==
=== Ajax ===
Becker was discovered during a talent day and was recruited to the Ajax Youth Academy in 2004. On 6 June 2011, it was announced that Becker had signed his first professional contract with the club until 30 June 2014.

Becker began the 2013–14 season playing for the A1 under-19 squad where he made five appearances in the group stage of the UEFA Youth League. On 14 October 2013, he made his professional debut for the reserves team Jong Ajax in a 3–0 home defeat to Fortuna Sittard in the Eerste Divisie. On 28 February 2014, Becker scored his first professional goal against Den Bosch. On 8 May 2014, he was called up to the first team by manager Frank de Boer for two friendly matches against Persija Jakarta and Persib Bandung in Indonesia, playing in the 3–0 win over Persija on 12 May 2014.

==== Loan to PEC Zwolle ====
On 4 January 2015, it was announced that Becker was sent on loan to PEC Zwolle until the end of the season.

=== ADO Den Haag ===
On 17 August 2016, it was confirmed that Becker would play for ADO Den Haag from the 2016–17 season. He signed a three-year deal with the club from The Hague. He stayed there until the 2018–19 season.

=== Union Berlin ===
In June 2019, German club 1. FC Union Berlin, newly promoted to the Bundesliga, announced the signing of Becker. Becker was awarded the Bundesliga Player of the Month in August 2022 after scoring 4 goals and 2 assists in 4 games, making him the first Union player to achieve this. On 6 October 2022, he scored the only goal in a 1–0 away win over Malmö FF in the 2022–23 UEFA Europa League group stage, to be his first goal in European competitions.

On 3 October 2023, he scored his first Champions League goals by netting a brace to give his club a 2–0 lead against Braga, which were also Union's first ever goals in competition; however, the match ended in a 3–2 defeat during the 2023–24 season.

=== Real Sociedad ===
On 18 January 2024, Becker signed a contract with La Liga club Real Sociedad until June 2026, for a transfer fee reported to be around €3 million. Only five days later he scored on his debut against Celta Vigo in the quarter-finals of the Copa del Rey. On matchday 13 of the 2024–2025 season, Becker scored the only goal against Barcelona that sealed the victory for La Real.

=== Osasuna ===
On 1 September 2025, Osasuna announced the signing of Becker on a two-year deal.

=== Mainz 05 ===
On 2 February 2026, Becker returned to the Bundesliga, signing for Mainz 05 on loan for the remainder of the 2025–26 season. Later that year, on 8 May, his loan move became permanent after the club avoided relegation, triggering a purchase obligation.

== International career ==
=== Netherlands ===
Becker was born in the Netherlands to Surinamese parents. Becker represented the Netherlands, his country of birth at various youth levels, making his debut for the Netherlands under-16 team in a 1–0 loss to Portugal at the 12th Tournoi Val de Marne '10 in France on 28 October 2010. He scored his first goal for the under-16 side on 6 February 2011 at the International Youth Tournament in Portugal, in the 4–1 win against Israel. On 16 September 2011, Becker made his debut for the U-17 team in the 1–0 win against Italy at the Vier Nationen Turnier in Germany. He scored his first under-17 goal against England at the XXXV Torneio Int. do Algarve '12 in Portugal. He scored once for the under-18 team in a friendly match against the United States on 11 September 2012. On 26 February 2014, Becker was called up by Wim van Zwam to the under-19 team for the friendly match against Spain on 5 March 2014. He made his under-19 debut in a 2–1 win, starting on the wing before being substituted off for Wessel Dammers in the 69th minute of the match.

=== Suriname ===
On 23 November 2020 it was announced by the SVB that Becker was fully eligible to represent the Suriname national team internationally. Although Suriname does not allow dual citizenship, the country have made an exception to issue special passports for athletes in the diaspora who want to represent Suriname as of 2019. He debuted with the Suriname national team in a 6–0 2022 FIFA World Cup qualification win over Bermuda on 4 June 2021, scoring a brace in his first start for the team. A couple of weeks later on 25 June Becker was named to the Surinamese squad for the 2021 CONCACAF Gold Cup.

== Career statistics ==
=== Club ===
As of match played 30 October 2026

Appearances and goals by club, season and competition
| Club | Season | League | | | National cup (Note: Includes KNVB Cup, DFB-Pokal, Copa del Rey) | | Europe | | Other | | Total | |
| Club | Season | Division | Apps | Goals | Apps | Goals | Apps | Goals | Apps | Goals | Apps | Goals |
|---|---|---|---|---|---|---|---|---|---|---|---|---|
| Jong Ajax | 2013–14 | Eerste Divisie | 14 | 1 | — | | — | | — | | 14 | 1 |
| Jong Ajax | 2014–15 | Eerste Divisie | 16 | 4 | — | | — | | — | | 16 | 4 |
| Jong Ajax | Total | | 30 | 5 | 0 | 0 | 0 | 0 | 0 | 0 | 30 | 5 |
| PEC Zwolle (loan) | 2014–15 | Eredivisie | 9 | 1 | 2 | 0 | — | | 1 (Note: Appearance(s) in Eredivisie European play-offs) | 0 | 12 | 1 |
| PEC Zwolle (loan) | 2015–16 | Eredivisie | 23 | 4 | 1 | 0 | — | | 2 | 0 | 26 | 4 |
| PEC Zwolle (loan) | Total | | 32 | 5 | 3 | 0 | 0 | 0 | 3 | 0 | 38 | 5 |
| ADO Den Haag | 2016–17 | Eredivisie | 28 | 3 | 3 | 0 | — | | — | | 31 | 3 |
| ADO Den Haag | 2017–18 | Eredivisie | 27 | 2 | 0 | 0 | — | | 2 | 0 | 29 | 2 |
| ADO Den Haag | 2018–19 | Eredivisie | 33 | 7 | 2 | 1 | — | | — | | 35 | 8 |
| ADO Den Haag | Total | | 88 | 12 | 5 | 1 | 0 | 0 | 2 | 0 | 95 | 13 |
| Union Berlin | 2019–20 | Bundesliga | 13 | 0 | 1 | 0 | — | | — | | 14 | 0 |
| Union Berlin | 2020–21 | Bundesliga | 18 | 3 | 2 | 0 | — | | — | | 20 | 3 |
| Union Berlin | 2021–22 | Bundesliga | 28 | 4 | 4 | 2 | 8 (Note: Appearances in UEFA Europa Conference League) | 0 | — | | 40 | 6 |
| Union Berlin | 2022–23 | Bundesliga | 34 | 11 | 4 | 0 | 10 (Note: Appearances in UEFA Europa League) | 1 | — | | 48 | 12 |
| Union Berlin | 2023–24 | Bundesliga | 11 | 0 | 2 | 1 | 5 (Note: Appearance(s) in UEFA Champions League) | 2 | — | | 18 | 3 |
| Union Berlin | Total | | 104 | 18 | 13 | 3 | 23 | 3 | 0 | 0 | 140 | 24 |
| Real Sociedad | 2023–24 | La Liga | 15 | 2 | 2 | 1 | 1 | 0 | — | | 18 | 3 |
| Real Sociedad | 2024–25 | La Liga | 22 | 2 | 4 | 0 | 10 | 1 | — | | 36 | 3 |
| Real Sociedad | Total | | 37 | 4 | 6 | 1 | 11 | 1 | — | | 54 | 6 |
| Osasuna | 2025–26 | La Liga | 9 | 0 | 2 | 1 | — | | — | | 11 | 1 |
| Mainz 05 (loan) | 2025–26 | Bundesliga | 13 | 3 | — | | 0 | 0 | — | | 13 | 3 |
| Mainz 05 | 2026–27 | Bundesliga | 8 | 2 | 2 | 1 | — | | — | | 10 | 3 |
| Career total | | | 321 | 49 | 31 | 7 | 34 | 4 | 5 | 0 | 391 | 60 |

=== International ===
As of match played 26 March 2026

Appearances and goals by national team and year
| National team | Year | Apps | Goals |
|---|---|---|---|
| Suriname | 2021 | 5 | 2 |
| Suriname | 2023 | 4 | 0 |
| Suriname | 2024 | 7 | 3 |
| Suriname | 2025 | 6 | 0 |
| Suriname | 2026 | 1 | 0 |
| Total | | 23 | 5 |

As of match played 15 October 2024
Suriname score listed first, score column indicates score after each Becker goal.

List of international goals scored by Sheraldo Becker
| No. | Date | Venue | Cap | Opponent | Score | Result | Competition |
|---|---|---|---|---|---|---|---|
| 1 | 4 June 2021 | Franklin Essed Stadion, Paramaribo, Suriname | 1 | Bermuda | 1–0 | 6–0 | 2022 FIFA World Cup qualification |
| 2 | 4 June 2021 | Franklin Essed Stadion, Paramaribo, Suriname | 1 | Bermuda | 3–0 | 6–0 | 2022 FIFA World Cup qualification |
| 3 | 5 June 2024 | Franklin Essed Stadion, Paramaribo, Suriname | 11 | Saint Vincent and the Grenadines | 1–1 | 4–1 | 2026 FIFA World Cup qualification |
| 4 | 15 October 2024 | Franklin Essed Stadion, Paramaribo, Suriname | 14 | Guyana | 1–0 | 5–1 | 2024–25 CONCACAF Nations League A |
| 5 | 15 October 2024 | Franklin Essed Stadion, Paramaribo, Suriname | 14 | Guyana | 2–0 | 5–1 | 2024–25 CONCACAF Nations League A |

== Honours ==
Individual

- Bundesliga Player of the Month: August 2022
