= Tim Maciejewski =

German footballer

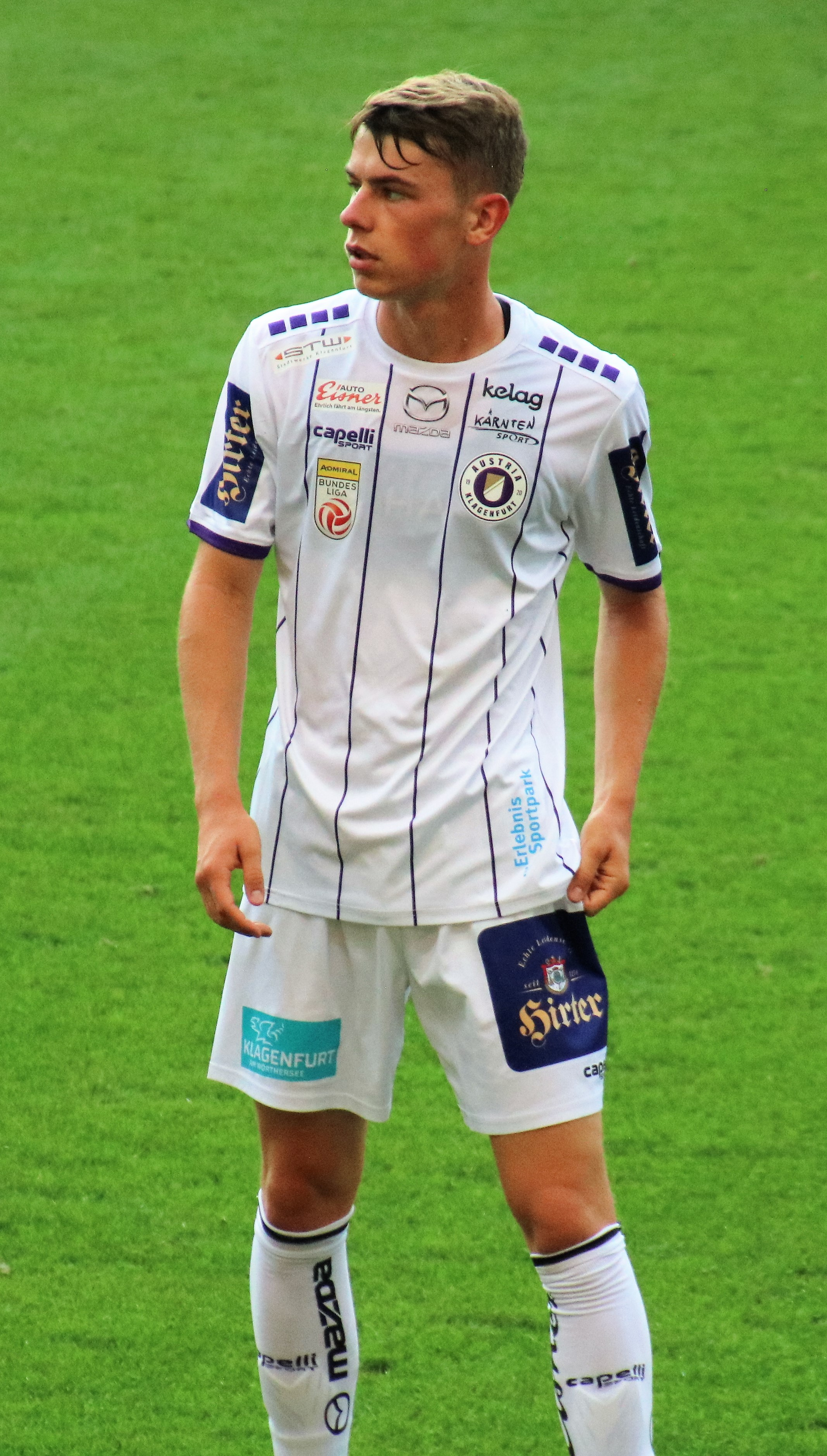
- Maciejewski with Austria Klagenfurt in 2021

Personal information
- Full name: Tim Luis Maciejewski
- Date of birth: 5 March 2001 (age 25)
- Place of birth: Berlin, Germany
- Height: 1.86 m (6 ft 1 in)
- Position: Right winger

Team information
- Current team: Erzgebirge Aue
- Number: 27

Youth career
- –2012: SC Staaken
- 2012–2017: Hertha BSC
- 2017–2020: Union Berlin

Senior career*
| Years | Team | Apps | (Gls) |
| 2020–2023 | Union Berlin | 1 | (0) |
| 2021–2022 | → Austria Klagenfurt (loan) | 28 | (2) |
| 2023–2025 | SV Sandhausen | 27 | (4) |
| 2025 | SV Babelsberg | 15 | (0) |
| 2025–2026 | FSV Luckenwalde | 34 | (7) |
| 2026– | Erzgebirge Aue | 10 | (5) |
- * Club domestic league appearances and goals as of 23 September 2026

Tim Luis Maciejewski (born 5 March 2001) is a German professional footballer who plays as a right winger for Regionalliga Nordost club Erzgebirge Aue.

== Career ==
Maciejewski made his professional debut for Union Berlin in the Bundesliga on 7 November 2020, coming on as a substitute for Sheraldo Becker in the 83rd minute of the home match against Arminia Bielefeld, which finished as a 5–0 win.
