= Fabio Schneider =

German footballer

Personal information
- Date of birth: 31 July 2002 (age 24)
- Place of birth: Berlin, Germany
- Height: 1.83 m (6 ft 0 in)
- Position: Midfielder

Team information
- Current team: FSV 63 Luckenwalde
- Number: 22

Youth career
- Union Berlin

Senior career*
Years	Team	Apps	(Gls)
2021–2023	Union Berlin	0	(0)
2022	→ KuPS (loan)	0	(0)
2022	→ KuPS II (loan)	1	(0)
2023	Greifswalder FC	22	(1)
2024–	FSV 63 Luckenwalde	19	(0)
- * Club domestic league appearances and goals as of 22:51, 2 July 2024 (UTC)

Fabio Schneider (born 31 July 2002) is a German professional footballer who plays as a midfielder for Regionalliga Nordost club FSV 63 Luckenwalde.

== Career ==
Schneider started his career with Bundesliga side Union Berlin. He was included in Union's 2021–22 Conference League squad, but remained on the bench in all games and was not called up for any Bundesliga or cup games.

Before the 2022 season, he was sent on loan to KuPS in Finland. On 29 January 2022, he debuted for KuPS during a 3–1 win over VPS in the Finnish League Cup. He suffered an injury on his KuPS II debut and did not play for the remainder of his loan term.

On 5 January 2023, Schneider signed with Greifswalder FC.
