= Laurenz Dehl =

German footballer (born 2001)

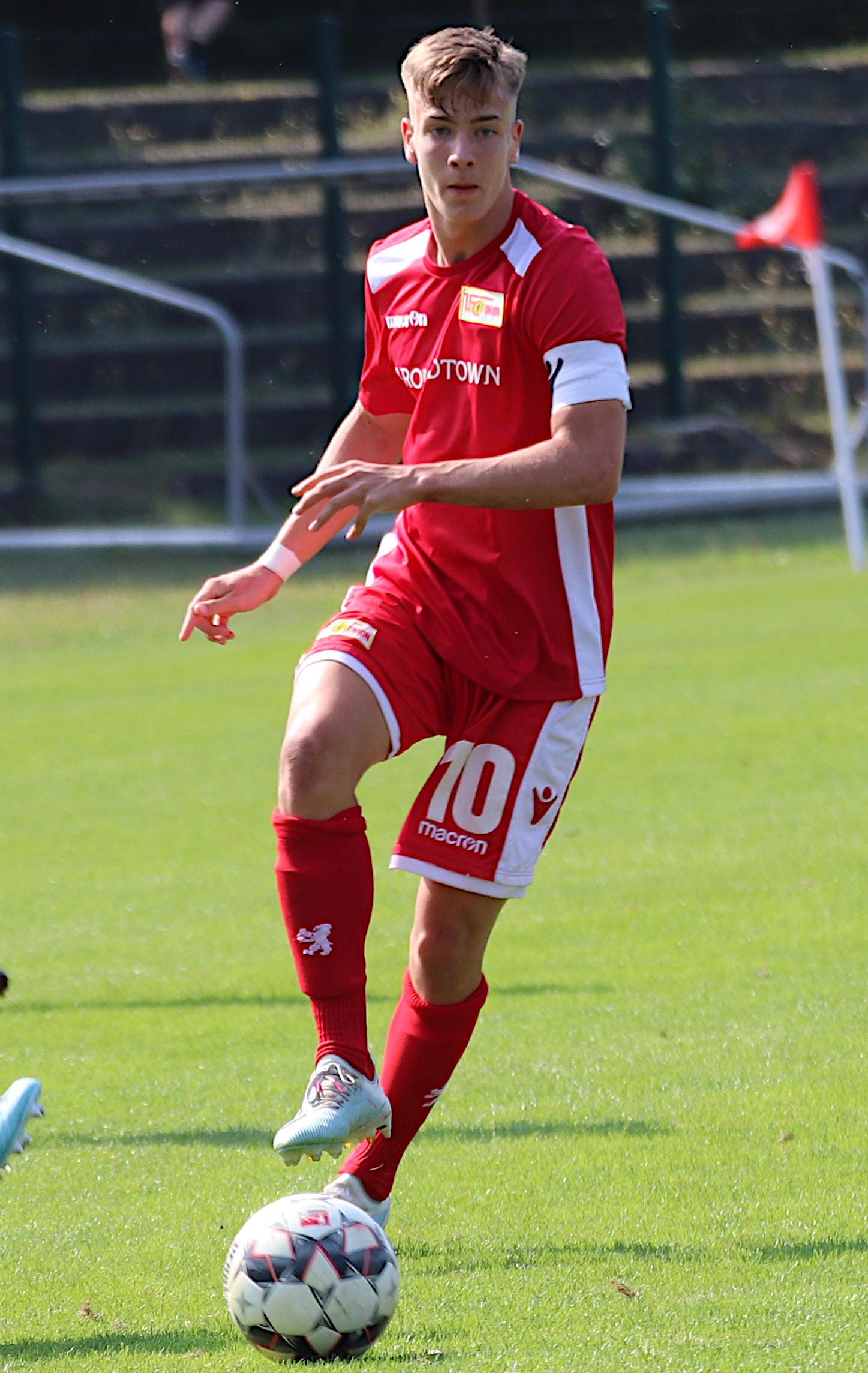

Personal information
- Date of birth: 12 December 2001 (age 24)
- Place of birth: Berlin, Germany
- Height: 1.80 m (5 ft 11 in)
- Position: Right midfielder

Team information
- Current team: Rot-Weiß Erfurt
- Number: 29

Youth career
- –2011: SV Blau-Gelb Berlin
- 2011–2020: Union Berlin

Senior career*
Years	Team	Apps	(Gls)
2020–2024	Union Berlin	0	(0)
2020–2021	→ Hallescher FC (loan)	22	(3)
2022	→ Bohemians (loan)	1	(0)
2023	→ Viktoria Berlin (loan)	16	(3)
2024–2025	Austria Klagenfurt	10	(1)
2024	→ Viktoria Berlin (loan)	15	(4)
2025–	Rot-Weiß Erfurt	26	(3)
- * Club domestic league appearances and goals as of 23 September 2026

Laurenz Dehl (born 12 December 2001) is a German professional footballer who plays as a right midfielder for Regionalliga Nordost club Rot-Weiß Erfurt.

== Career ==
Born in Berlin, Dehl played youth football for SV Blau-Gelb Berlin before joining the academy of Union Berlin in 2011. He progressed through their academy and signed a two-year professional contract in summer 2019. He joined 3. Liga side Hallescher FC on a season-long loan in July 2020. He made his senior debut on 20 September 2020 as a substitute in a 2–0 victory away to 1. FC Magdeburg. He scored his first professional goal on 21 October 2020 with the opening goal of a 4–1 win over SV Meppen. He received the first red card of his career on 12 December 2020 after picking up a second yellow card for preventing Dynamo Dresden from taking a quick throw-in. He scored 3 goals in 22 appearances across the 2020–21 season.

Dehl made his debut for Union on 26 August 2021, as a substitute in a 0–0 Europa Conference League draw with Kuopion PS, in what turned out to be his only appearance of the season. On 2 December 2021, Union announced Dehl had to undergo surgery for an injury he picked up. In April 2022, Union extended Dehl's expiring contract.

On 25 July 2022, Dehl joined Bohemians in Ireland on loan until the end of the season in November 2022. He made just 1 appearance during his time in Ireland, playing the first 45 minutes of a 1–0 loss at home to Dundalk on 12 August 2022.

On 4 January 2023, Dehl was loaned to Viktoria Berlin.

On 24 January 2024, Dehl signed a contract with Austria Klagenfurt in Austria until June 2026 and was loaned back to Viktoria Berlin for the remainder of the 2023–24 season.

He returned to Germany in June 2025, signing for Regionalliga Nordost club Rot-Weiß Erfurt on a free transfer. He signed a two-year contract with the club.

== Style of play ==
Having started his career as an attacking midfielder, he retrained as a right-back during the 2021–22 season according to Union managing director Oliver Ruhnert.

== Career statistics ==
As of match played 22 June 2026

Appearances and goals by club, season and competition
Club	Season	League			National Cup (Note: Includes DFB-Pokal & FAI Cup)		Other		Total	
Club	Season	Division	Apps	Goals	Apps	Goals	Apps	Goals	Apps	Goals
Union Berlin	2020–21	Bundesliga	0	0	0	0	0	0	0	0
Union Berlin	2021–22	Bundesliga	0	0	0	0	1 (Note: Appearance(s) in UEFA Europa Conference League)	0	1	0
Union Berlin	2022–23	Bundesliga	0	0	0	0	0	0	0	0
Union Berlin	2023–24	Bundesliga	0	0	0	0	0	0	0	0
Union Berlin	Total		0	0	0	0	1	0	1	0
Hallescher FC (loan)	2020–21	3. Liga	22	3	—		0	0	22	3
Bohemians (loan)	2022	League of Ireland Premier Division	1	0	0	0	—		1	0
Viktoria Berlin (loan)	2022–23	Regionalliga Nordost	16	3	—		0	0	16	3
Austria Klagenfurt	2023–24	Austrian Bundesliga	0	0	0	0	0	0	0	0
Austria Klagenfurt	2024–25	Austrian Bundesliga	10	1	0	0	0	0	10	1
Austria Klagenfurt	Total		10	1	0	0	0	0	10	1
Viktoria Berlin (loan)	2023–24	Regionalliga Nordost	15	4	—		0	0	15	4
Rot-Weiß Erfurt	2025–26	Regionalliga Nordost	22	0	—		0	0	22	0
Career total			86	11	0	0	1	0	87	11
