= 2020–21 TSG 1899 Hoffenheim season =

TSG 1899 Hoffenheim
2020–21 season
- President: Peter Hofmann
- Head coach: Sebastian Hoeneß
- Stadium: PreZero Arena
- Bundesliga: 11th
- DFB-Pokal: Second round
- UEFA Europa League: Round of 32
- Top goalscorer: League: Andrej Kramarić (20); All: Andrej Kramarić (25)
- Highest home attendance: 6,030 vs Bayern Munich and Borussia Dortmund
Home colours	Away colours	Third colours

The 2020–21 season was the 122nd season in the existence of TSG 1899 Hoffenheim and the club's 13th consecutive season in the top flight of German football. In addition to the domestic league, TSG 1899 Hoffenheim participated in this season's editions of the DFB-Pokal and in the UEFA Europa League. The season covered the period from 1 July 2020 to 30 June 2021. On 27 September 2020, on matchday 2 of Bundesliga season, Hoffenhiem ended Bayern Munich's 32 match winning run.

== Players ==
=== First-team squad ===
As of 1 February 2021

Note: Flags indicate national team as defined under FIFA eligibility rules; some limited exceptions apply. Players may hold more than one non-FIFA nationality.

No.	Pos.	Nation	Player
1	GK	GER	Oliver Baumann (vice-captain)
2	DF	NED	Joshua Brenet
3	DF	CZE	Pavel Kadeřábek
4	DF	BIH	Ermin Bičakčić
5	DF	GRE	Kostas Stafylidis
6	DF	NOR	Håvard Nordtveit
8	MF	GER	Dennis Geiger
9	FW	TOG	Ihlas Bebou
10	FW	ISR	Mu'nas Dabbur
11	MF	AUT	Florian Grillitsch
12	GK	GER	Philipp Pentke
14	MF	AUT	Christoph Baumgartner
15	DF	GHA	Kasim Nuhu
16	MF	GER	Sebastian Rudy (on loan from Schalke 04)
17	DF	ENG	Ryan Sessegnon (on loan from Tottenham Hotspur)
18	MF	MLI	Diadie Samassékou

No.	Pos.	Nation	Player
19	FW	ALG	Ishak Belfodil
20	MF	SRB	Mijat Gaćinović
21	DF	GER	Benjamin Hübner (captain)
22	DF	GER	Kevin Vogt
23	FW	ARM	Sargis Adamyan
25	DF	GER	Kevin Akpoguma
27	FW	CRO	Andrej Kramarić
28	DF	USA	Chris Richards (on loan from Bayern Munich)
29	FW	DEN	Robert Skov
30	MF	GER	Marco John
32	DF	NED	Melayro Bogarde
33	FW	FRA	Georginio Rutter
35	FW	GER	Maximilian Beier
37	GK	GER	Luca Philipp
38	DF	AUT	Stefan Posch

=== Players out on loan ===
Note: Flags indicate national team as defined under FIFA eligibility rules; some limited exceptions apply. Players may hold more than one non-FIFA nationality.

No.	Pos.	Nation	Player
—	MF	ISR	Ilay Elmkies (at ADO Den Haag until 30 June 2021)
—	DF	NED	Justin Hoogma (at FC Utrecht until 30 June 2021)
—	FW	BRA	Klauss (at Standard Liège until 30 June 2022)
—	FW	DEN	Jacob Bruun Larsen (at Anderlecht until 30 June 2021)
—	MF	BRA	Bruno Nazário (at Botafogo until 30 June 2021)
—	FW	GER	David Otto (at Jahn Regensburg until 30 June 2022)
–	DF	BRA	Lucas Ribeiro (at Internacional until 31 December 2021)

== Transfers ==
=== Transfers in ===
#	Position	Player	Transferred from	Fee	Date	Source
20	MF	(Serbia) Mijat Gaćinović	(Germany) Eintracht Frankfurt	€3,000,000	4 August 2020	
	DF	(Austria) Aleksandar Borković	FK Austria Wien	Undisclosed	26 August 2020	
16	MF	(Germany) Sebastian Rudy	(Germany) Schalke 04	Loan	5 October 2020	
17	DF	(England) Ryan Sessegnon	(England) Tottenham Hotspur	Loan	5 October 2020	
28	DF	(United States) Chris Richards	(Germany) Bayern Munich	Loan	1 February 2021	
33	FW	(France) Georginio Rutter	(France) Rennes	€500,000	1 February 2021	

=== Transfers out ===
#	Position	Player	Transferred to	Fee	Date	Source
24	DF	(Netherlands) Justin Hoogma	(Netherlands) FC Utrecht	Loan	1 July 2020	
13	MF	(Germany) Leonardo Bittencourt	(Germany) Werder Bremen	€7,000,000	8 July 2020	
	GK	(Switzerland) Gregor Kobel	(Germany) VfB Stuttgart	€4,000,000	28 July 2020	
28	GK	(Germany) Michael Esser	(Germany) Hannover 96	Free	30 July 2020	
17	MF	(Switzerland) Steven Zuber	(Germany) Eintracht Frankfurt	€3,000,000	4 August 2020	
31	DF	(Brazil) Lucas Ribeiro	(Brazil) Internacional	Loan	10 August 2020	
	FW	(Brazil) Felipe Pires	(Portugal) Moreirense	Undisclosed	12 September 2020	
41	MF	(Israel) Ilay Elmkies	(Netherlands) ADO Den Haag	Loan	18 September 2020	
33	FW	(Brazil) Klauss	(Belgium) Standard Liège	Loan	13 January 2021	
26	FW	(Germany) David Otto	(Germany) Jahn Regensburg	Loan	20 January 2021	
7	FW	(Denmark) Jacob Bruun Larsen	(Belgium) Anderlecht	Loan	23 January 2021	

== Pre-season and friendlies ==
Win Draw Loss

13 August 2020 Friendly	TSG Hoffenheim	7–1	SV Wehen Wiesbaden	Zuzenhausen, Germany
15:30 CEST (UTC+2)	Kramarić 8', 16' (pen.); Baumgartner 66', 70'; Gaćinović 80'; Skov 83'; Bebou 90+1'	Report	Schwede 90+6'	Stadium: Akademie-Arena Rasen 1
Note: Match was played in four 25-minute quarters.

22 August 2020 Friendly	TSG Hoffenheim	1–0	SpVgg Greuther Fürth	Rottach-Egern, Germany
13:00 CEST (UTC+2)	Baumgartner 48'			Stadium: Sportplatz Birkenmoos

22 August 2020 Friendly	TSG Hoffenheim	2–5	1. FC Nürnberg	Rottach-Egern, Germany
17:00 CEST (UTC+2)	Klauss 3', 71'	Report	Sørensen 31'; Lohkemper 54', 69'; Knothe 56'; Celebi 77'	Stadium: Sportplatz Birkenmoos

29 August 2020 Friendly	TSG Hoffenheim	2–1	Mainz 05	Zuzenhausen, Germany
13:00 CEST (UTC+2)	Posch 55'; Skov 63'		Mateta 51'	Stadium: Akademie-Arena Rasen 1

29 August 2020 Friendly	TSG Hoffenheim	2–1	Mainz 05	Zuzenhausen, Germany
15:30 CEST (UTC+2)	Klauss 10'; Bebou 86'		Öztunalı 22'	Stadium: Akademie-Arena Rasen 1

== Competitions ==
=== Overview ===
Competition	First match	Last match	Starting round	Final position	Record							
Competition	First match	Last match	Starting round	Final position	Pld	W	D	L	GF	GA	GD	Win %
Bundesliga	19 September 2020	22 May 2021	Matchday 1	11th	34	11	10	13	52	54	−2	32.35
DFB-Pokal	13 September 2020	22 December 2020	First round	Second round	2	0	2	0	4	4	+0	0.00
UEFA Europa League	22 October 2020	25 February 2021	Group stage	Round of 32	8	5	2	1	20	7	+13	62.50
Total					44	16	14	14	76	65	+11	36.36

Last updated: 22 May 2021
Source: Soccerway

=== Bundesliga ===
==== League table ====
Pos	Team	Pld	W	D	L	GF	GA	GD	Pts
9	VfB Stuttgart	34	12	9	13	56	55	+1	45
10	SC Freiburg	34	12	9	13	52	52	0	45
11	1899 Hoffenheim	34	11	10	13	52	54	−2	43
12	Mainz 05	34	10	9	15	39	56	−17	39
13	FC Augsburg	34	10	6	18	36	54	−18	36

Source: DFB
Rules for classification: 1) Points; 2) Goal difference; 3) Goals scored; 4) Head-to-head results; 5) Head-to-head away goals scored; 6) Away goals scored; 7) Play-off.

==== Results summary ====
Overall								Home						Away					
Pld	W	D	L	GF	GA	GD	Pts	W	D	L	GF	GA	GD	W	D	L	GF	GA	GD
34	11	10	13	52	54	−2	43	8	3	6	32	24	+8	3	7	7	20	30	−10

Last updated: 22 May 2021.
Source: DFB

==== Results by round ====
Round	1	2	3	4	5	6	7	8	9	10	11	12	13	14	15	16	17	18	19	20	21	22	23	24	25	26	27	28	29	30	31	32	33	34
Ground	A	H	A	H	A	H	A	H	A	H	A	H	A	H	A	H	A	H	A	H	A	H	A	H	A	H	A	H	A	H	A	H	A	H
Result	W	W	L	L	D	L	L	D	D	W	L	L	W	L	L	D	W	W	L	L	D	W	D	W	L	L	L	D	D	W	D	W	D	W
Position	6	1	6	8	9	12	13	12	12	10	12	13	12	13	14	14	11	11	12	12	12	11	11	11	11	11	12	12	12	11	11	11	11	11

Updated to match(es) played on 22 May 2021. Source: DFB
A = Away; H = Home; W = Win; D = Draw; L = Loss

==== Matches ====
The league fixtures were announced on 7 August 2020.

19 September 2020 1	1. FC Köln	2–3	TSG Hoffenheim	Cologne
15:30 CEST (UTC+2)	Andersson 22'; Bornauw (yellow card) 33'; Duda (yellow card) 69'; Hector (yellow card) 85'; Drexler 86'	Report	Kramarić 4', 45+3' (pen.), 90+2'; Bičakčić (yellow card) 45+5'; Bebou (yellow card) 90'; Baumann (yellow card) 90'; Kadeřábek (yellow card) 90+5'	Stadium: RheinEnergieStadion; Attendance: 0 Referee: Daniel Siebert

27 September 2020 2	TSG Hoffenheim	4–1	Bayern Munich	Sinsheim
15:30 CEST (UTC+2)	Bičakčić 16'; Geiger (yellow card) 21'; Dabbur 24'; Baumgartner (yellow card) 28'; Kramarić (yellow card) 45+1', (goal) 77', 90+1' (pen.)	Report	Kimmich 36'; Boateng (yellow card) 90+1'; Neuer (yellow card) 90+1'	Stadium: Rhein-Neckar-Arena; Attendance: 6,030; Referee: Benjamin Brand

3 October 2020 3	Eintracht Frankfurt	2–1	TSG Hoffenheim	Frankfurt
15:30 CEST (UTC+2)	Rode (yellow card) 35'; Zuber (yellow card) 52'; Kamada 55'; Dost 71'	Report	Kramarić 18'; Geiger (yellow card) 41'; Grillitsch (yellow card) 56'; Posch (yellow card) 83'	Stadium: Deutsche Bank Park; Attendance: 8,000; Referee: Manuel Gräfe

17 October 2020 4	TSG Hoffenheim	0–1	Borussia Dortmund	Sinsheim
15:30 CEST (UTC+2)	Posch (yellow card) 58'	Report	Reus 76'; Reyna (yellow card) 90'	Stadium: Rhein-Neckar-Arena; Attendance: 6,030; Referee: Sascha Stegemann

25 October 2020 5	Werder Bremen	1–1	TSG Hoffenheim	Bremen
18:00 CET (UTC+1)	Eggestein 5'; Friedl (yellow card) 79'; Gebre Selassie (yellow card) 90+2'	Report	Geiger 22'; Posch (yellow card) 59'; Gaćinović (yellow card) 89'	Stadium: Weser-Stadion; Attendance: 0 Referee: Daniel Schlager

2 November 2020 6	TSG Hoffenheim	1–3	Union Berlin	Sinsheim
20:30 CET (UTC+1)	Skov (red card) 58'; Dabbur 80'; Baumgartner (yellow card) 90'	Report	Kruse 59' (pen.); Luthe (yellow card) 63'; Griesbeck (yellow card) 71'; Pohjanpalo 85'; Teuchert 90+4'	Stadium: Rhein-Neckar-Arena; Attendance: 0 Referee: Robert Hartmann

8 November 2020 7	VfL Wolfsburg	2–1	TSG Hoffenheim	Wolfsburg
15:30 CET (UTC+1)	Steffen 5'; Weghorst 26', (penalty missed) 84'; Brooks (yellow card) 48'	Report	Baumgartner (yellow card) 30'; Rudy (yellow card) 45+3'; Vogt (yellow card) 82'; Adamyan 88'; Dabbur (penalty missed) 90+4'	Stadium: Volkswagen Arena; Attendance: 0 Referee: Sven Jablonski

21 November 2020 8	TSG Hoffenheim	3–3	VfB Stuttgart	Sinsheim
15:30 CET (UTC+1)	Sessegnon (yellow card) 4', (goal) 48'; Baumgartner 16'; Kramarić 70' (pen.); Posch (yellow card) 77'; Geiger (yellow card) 90+5'	Report	González 18'; Silas 27'; Castro (yellow card) 30'; Kempf (yellow card) 89', (goal) 90+3'	Stadium: Rhein-Neckar-Arena; Attendance: 0 Referee: Daniel Siebert

29 November 2020 9	Mainz 05	1–1	TSG Hoffenheim	Mainz
18:00 CET (UTC+1)	Quaison 33'	Report	Bebou 62'; Geiger (red card) 80'	Stadium: Opel Arena; Attendance: 0 Referee: Sascha Stegemann

7 December 2020 10	TSG Hoffenheim	3–1	FC Augsburg	Sinsheim
20:30 CET (UTC+1)	Grillitsch 17', 46'; Bebou 50'	Report	Caligiuri 31'; Gumny (yellow card) 74'	Stadium: Rhein-Neckar-Arena; Attendance: 0 Referee: Florian Badstübner

13 December 2020 11	Bayer Leverkusen	4–1	TSG Hoffenheim	Leverkusen
18:00 CET (UTC+1)	Bailey 4', 27'; Diaby (yellow card) 31'; Sinkgraven (yellow card) 35'; Wirtz 55'; Amiri (yellow card) 74'; Alario 90+1' (pen.)	Report	Grillitsch (yellow card) 38' (yellow-red card) 64'; Baumgartner 50'; Posch (yellow card) 58' (yellow-red card) 79'; Vogt (yellow card) 74'; Nordtveit (yellow card) 90+1'	Stadium: BayArena; Attendance: 0 Referee: Martin Petersen

16 December 2020 12	TSG Hoffenheim	0–1	RB Leipzig	Sinsheim
20:30 CET (UTC+1)	Vogt (yellow card) 50'; Sessegnon (yellow card) 56'	Report	Poulsen 60'	Stadium: Rhein-Neckar-Arena; Attendance: 0 Referee: Daniel Schlager

19 December 2020 13	Borussia Mönchengladbach	1–2	TSG Hoffenheim	Mönchengladbach
15:30 CET (UTC+1)	Stindl 34' (pen.); Thuram (red card) 79'; Ginter (yellow card) 90+3'	Report	Geiger (yellow card) 38'; Kramarić 75'; Posch (yellow card) 79'; Sessegnon 86'; Rudy (yellow card) 87'	Stadium: Borussia-Park; Attendance: 0 Referee: Frank Willenborg

2 January 2021 14	TSG Hoffenheim	1–3	SC Freiburg	Sinsheim
15:30 CET (UTC+1)	Akpoguma (yellow card) 16'; Bebou 58'; Vogt (yellow card) 82'	Report	Santamaria 7'; Kwon (yellow card) 24'; Grifo 34' (pen.); Höfler (yellow card) 36'; Kasim 42' (o.g.)	Stadium: Rhein-Neckar-Arena; Attendance: 0 Referee: Robert Hartmann

9 January 2021 15	Schalke 04	4–0	TSG Hoffenheim	Gelsenkirchen
15:30 CET (UTC+1)	Kabak (yellow card) 24'; Hoppe 42', 57', 63'; Uth (yellow card) 71'; Harit 80'	Report	Bogarde (yellow card) 13'; Kramarić (yellow card) 42'; Gaćinović (yellow card) 50'; Baumgartner (yellow card) 52'	Stadium: Veltins-Arena; Attendance: 0 Referee: Felix Zwayer

16 January 2021 16	TSG Hoffenheim	0–0	Arminia Bielefeld	Sinsheim
15:30 CET (UTC+1)	John (yellow card) 37'	Report	Nilsson (yellow card) 77'	Stadium: Rhein-Neckar-Arena; Attendance: 0 Referee: Marco Fritz

19 January 2021 17	Hertha BSC	0–3	TSG Hoffenheim	Berlin
20:30 CET (UTC+1)	Piątek (penalty missed) 12'; Lukebakio (yellow card) 66'	Report	Gaćinović (yellow card) 25'; Rudy 33'; Kramarić 68', 88'	Stadium: Olympiastadion; Attendance: 0 Referee: Harm Osmers

24 January 2021 18	TSG Hoffenheim	3–0	1. FC Köln	Sinsheim
18:00 CET (UTC+1)	Kramarić 7' (pen.), 75' (pen.); Bebou (yellow card) 13'; Baumgartner 28'; Posch (yellow card) 52'	Report	Čestić (yellow card) 6'; Skhiri (yellow card) 56'; Meré (yellow card) 63'; Modeste (penalty missed) 78'	Stadium: Rhein-Neckar-Arena; Attendance: 0 Referee: Sven Jablonski

30 January 2021 19	Bayern Munich	4–1	TSG Hoffenheim	Munich
15:30 CET (UTC+1)	Boateng 32'; Müller 43'; Roca (yellow card) 53'; Lewandowski 57'; Gnabry 63'	Report	Kramarić 44'	Stadium: Allianz Arena; Attendance: 0 Referee: Benjamin Cortus

7 February 2021 20	TSG Hoffenheim	1–3	Eintracht Frankfurt	Sinsheim
15:30 CET (UTC+1)	Bebou 47'	Report	Kostić 15'; Hinteregger (yellow card) 43'; Younes (yellow card) 56'; Ndicka 62'; Silva 64'; Tuta (yellow card) 88'	Stadium: Rhein-Neckar-Arena; Attendance: 0 Referee: Daniel Siebert

13 February 2021 21	Borussia Dortmund	2–2	TSG Hoffenheim	Dortmund
15:30 CET (UTC+1)	Delaney (yellow card) 21'; Sancho 24'; Akanji (yellow card) 67'; Haaland 81'; Dahoud (yellow card) 81'	Report	Rudy (yellow card) 27'; Dabbur 31', (yellow card) 85'; Bebou 51'; Grillitsch (yellow card) 57'; Vogt (yellow card) 59'; Posch (yellow card) 60'; Samassékou (yellow card) 65'; Gaćinović (yellow card) 90+2'	Stadium: Signal Iduna Park; Attendance: 0 Referee: Bastian Dankert

21 February 2021 22	TSG Hoffenheim	4–0	Werder Bremen	Sinsheim
18:00 CET (UTC+1)	Rudy (yellow card) 16'; Bebou 26'; Baumgartner 44'; Dabbur 49'; Kadeřábek (yellow card) 51'; Rutter 90'	Report	Toprak (yellow card) 8'; Friedl (yellow card) 69'	Stadium: Rhein-Neckar-Arena; Attendance: 0 Referee: Robert Schröder

28 February 2021 23	Union Berlin	1–1	TSG Hoffenheim	Berlin
13:30 CET (UTC+1)	Kruse 9' (pen.)	Report	Schlotterbeck 29' (o.g.); Richards (yellow card) 79'; Vogt (yellow card) 90+4'	Stadium: Stadion An der Alten Försterei; Attendance: 0 Referee: Tobias Stieler

6 March 2021 24	TSG Hoffenheim	2–1	VfL Wolfsburg	Sinsheim
15:30 CET (UTC+1)	Baumgartner 8'; Kramarić 41'; Sessegnon (yellow card) 70'; Dabbur (yellow card) 80'	Report	Weghorst 23'; Steffen (yellow card) 30'; Lacroix (yellow card) 65'; Schlager (yellow card) 72'; Paulo Otávio (yellow card) 88', (red card) 90+4'	Stadium: Rhein-Neckar-Arena; Attendance: 0 Referee: Markus Schmidt

14 March 2021 25	VfB Stuttgart	2–0	TSG Hoffenheim	Stuttgart
18:00 CET (UTC+1)	Kasim 15' (o.g.); Kalajdžić 64'	Report	Sessegnon (yellow card) 11'; Grillitsch (yellow card) 58'	Stadium: Mercedes-Benz Arena; Attendance: 0 Referee: Christian Dingert

21 March 2021 26	TSG Hoffenheim	1–2	Mainz 05	Sinsheim
13:30 CET (UTC+1)	Bebou 39'	Report	Glatzel 1'; Kohr 41'	Stadium: Rhein-Neckar-Arena; Attendance: 0 Referee: Marco Fritz

3 April 2021 27	FC Augsburg	2–1	TSG Hoffenheim	Augsburg
15:30 CEST (UTC+2)	Vargas 8'; Hahn 23', (yellow card) 90+1'	Report	Samassékou (yellow card) 37'; Skov 86'	Stadium: WWK Arena; Attendance: 0 Referee: Guido Winkmann

12 April 2021 28	TSG Hoffenheim	0–0	Bayer Leverkusen	Sinsheim
20:30 CEST (UTC+2)	Baumgartner (yellow card) 89'	Report	Wendell (yellow card) 81'	Stadium: Rhein-Neckar-Arena; Attendance: 0 Referee: Matthias Jöllenbeck

16 April 2021 29	RB Leipzig	0–0	TSG Hoffenheim	Leipzig
20:30 CEST (UTC+2)		Report	Posch (yellow card) 46'; Baumgartner (yellow card) 79'	Stadium: Red Bull Arena; Attendance: 0 Referee: Manuel Gräfe

21 April 2021 30	TSG Hoffenheim	3–2	Borussia Mönchengladbach	Sinsheim
20:30 CEST (UTC+2)	Grillitsch (yellow card) 10'; Kramarić 49', 65'; Posch (yellow card) 53'; Bebou 60'; Kadeřábek (yellow card) 90'	Report	Pléa 25'; Lazaro 45+1'	Stadium: Rhein-Neckar-Arena; Attendance: 0 Referee: Daniel Siebert

24 April 2021 31	SC Freiburg	1–1	TSG Hoffenheim	Freiburg
15:30 CEST (UTC+2)	Schlotterbeck (yellow card) 50'; Grifo 81' (pen.)	Report	Kramarić 40'; Bebou (yellow card) 48'; Samassékou (yellow card) 59'	Stadium: Schwarzwald-Stadion; Attendance: 0 Referee: Manuel Gräfe

8 May 2021 32	TSG Hoffenheim	4–2	Schalke 04	Sinsheim
15:30 CEST (UTC+2)	Kramarić 47'; Akpoguma 52'; Baumgartner 60'; Adamyan (yellow card) 62'; Bebou 64'	Report	Uth 12', (yellow card) 56'; Serdar (yellow card) 35'; Mustafi 42'	Stadium: Rhein-Neckar-Arena; Attendance: 0 Referee: Guido Winkmann

15 May 2021 33	Arminia Bielefeld	1–1	TSG Hoffenheim	Bielefeld
15:30 CEST (UTC+2)	Voglsammer 23'; Lucoqui (yellow card) 85'	Report	Kramarić 5'; Adamyan (yellow card) 12'; Gaćinović (yellow card) 90+1'	Stadium: Bielefelder Alm; Attendance: 0 Referee: Daniel Schlager

22 May 2021 34	TSG Hoffenheim	2–1	Hertha BSC	Sinsheim
15:30 CEST (UTC+2)	Adamyan 49'; Kramarić 90+1'	Report	Darida 43'	Stadium: Rhein-Neckar-Arena; Attendance: 100; Referee: Frank Willenborg

=== DFB-Pokal ===
13 September 2020 First round	Chemnitzer FC	2–2 (a.e.t.) (2–3 p)	TSG Hoffenheim	Chemnitz
15:30 CEST (UTC+2)	Freiberger 59'; Kurt (yellow card) 90'; Bickel 100', (yellow card) 101'; Schimmel (yellow card) 110'; Grym (yellow card) 117'	Report	Kramarić 48', 111' (pen.); Posch (yellow card) 64'; Geiger (yellow card) 70'	Stadium: Stadion an der Gellertstraße; Attendance: 3,095; Referee: Patrick Hanslbauer
	Penalties
	Grym (penalty missed); Müller (penalty missed); Freiberger (penalty scored); Campulka (penalty scored); Bickel (penalty missed)		(penalty scored) Kramarić; (penalty scored) Belfodil; (penalty missed) Gaćinović; (penalty missed) Bičakčić; (penalty scored) Baumgartner

22 December 2020 Second round	TSG Hoffenheim	2–2 (a.e.t.) (6–7 p)	Greuther Fürth	Sinsheim
18:30 CET (UTC+1)	Baumgartner (yellow card) 5'; Kramarić 13'; Akpoguma 49', (yellow card) 115'; Bebou (yellow card) 62'; Kasim (yellow card) 102'; Gaćinović (yellow card) 105'	Report	Stach (yellow card) 10'; Ernst 21'; Meyerhöfer 46'; Jaeckel (yellow card) 80'; Seguin (penalty missed) 90+4'; Hrgota (yellow card) 101'	Stadium: Rhein-Neckar-Arena; Attendance: 0 Referee: Sören Storks
	Penalties
	Kramarić (penalty scored); Rudy (penalty scored); Skov (penalty scored); Adamyan (penalty scored); Vogt (penalty missed); Bogarde (penalty missed); Akpoguma (penalty scored); Sessegnon (penalty scored); Kasim (penalty missed)		(penalty missed) Bauer; (penalty scored) Raum; (penalty scored) Seguin; (penalty scored) Sarpei; (penalty scored) Hrgota; (penalty missed) Ernst; (penalty scored) Jaeckel; (penalty scored) Tillman; (penalty scored) Meyerhöfer

=== UEFA Europa League ===
==== Group stage ====
The group stage draw was held on 2 October 2020.

Pos	Team	Pld	W	D	L	GF	GA	GD	Pts	Qualification	HOF	ZVE	LIB	GNT
1	(Germany) TSG Hoffenheim	6	5	1	0	17	2	+15	16	Advance to knockout phase	—	2–0	5–0	4–1
2	(Serbia) Red Star Belgrade	6	3	2	1	9	4	+5	11	Advance to knockout phase	0–0	—	5–1	2–1
3	(Czech Republic) Slovan Liberec	6	2	1	3	4	13	−9	7		0–2	0–0	—	1–0
4	(Belgium) Gent	6	0	0	6	4	15	−11	0		1–4	0–2	1–2	—

Source: UEFA
Rules for classification: Group stage tiebreakers

22 October 2020 1	TSG Hoffenheim (Germany)	2–0	(Serbia) Red Star Belgrade	Sinsheim, Germany
21:00 CEST (UTC+2)	Baumgartner 64'; Dabbur 90+3'	Report	Falcinelli (yellow card) 44'; Sanogo (yellow card) 68'	Stadium: Rhein-Neckar-Arena; Attendance: 0 (Note: Due to the COVID-19 pandemic in Europe, the match was played behind closed doors.); Referee: Alejandro Hernández (Spain)

29 October 2020 2	Gent (Belgium)	1–4	(Germany) TSG Hoffenheim	Ghent, Belgium
18:55 CET (UTC+1)	Ngadeu-Ngadjui (yellow card) 35'; Kleindienst 90+3'	Report	Belfodil 36' (pen.); Rudy (yellow card) 51'; Grillitsch 52'; Vogt (yellow card) 72'; Gaćinović 73'; Baumgartner 90+4'	Stadium: Ghelamco Arena; Attendance: 0 Referee: Sandro Schärer (Switzerland)

5 November 2020 3	TSG Hoffenheim (Germany)	5–0	(Czech Republic) Slovan Liberec	Sinsheim, Germany
21:00 CET (UTC+1)	Dabbur 22', 30'; Bogarde (yellow card) 36'; Grillitsch 59'; Adamyan 71', 76'	Report	Pourzitidis (yellow card) 28'; Koscelník (yellow card) 52'	Stadium: Rhein-Neckar-Arena; Attendance: 0 Referee: Sergei Karasev (Russia)

26 November 2020 4	Slovan Liberec (Czech Republic)	0–2	(Germany) TSG Hoffenheim	Liberec, Czech Republic
18:55 CET (UTC+1)	Mikula (yellow card) 13'; Mara (yellow card) 88'; Koscelník (yellow card) 90+2'	Report	Bogarde (yellow card) 17'; Gaćinović (yellow card) 65'; Nordtveit (yellow card) 69'; Baumgartner 77'; Skov (yellow card) 81'; Kramarić 89' (pen.)	Stadium: Stadion u Nisy; Attendance: 0 Referee: Jérôme Brisard (France)

3 December 2020 5	Red Star Belgrade (Serbia)	0–0	(Germany) TSG Hoffenheim	Belgrade, Serbia
18:55 CET (UTC+1)	Kanga (yellow card) 24'; Milunović (yellow card) 87'	Report	Bogarde (yellow card) 67'; Vogt (yellow card) 69'	Stadium: Red Star Stadium; Attendance: 0 Referee: Bobby Madden (Scotland)

10 December 2020 6	TSG Hoffenheim (Germany)	4–1	(Belgium) Gent	Sinsheim, Germany
21:00 CET (UTC+1)	Beier 21', 49'; Skov 26'; John (yellow card) 44'; Kramarić 64'; Amade (yellow card) 90+3'	Report	Bezus (yellow card) 73'; Fortuna 81'	Stadium: Rhein-Neckar-Arena; Attendance: 0 Referee: Anastasios Papapetrou (Greece)

==== Round of 32 ====
The draw for the round of 32 was held on 14 December 2020.

18 February 2021 First leg	Molde (Norway)	3–3	(Germany) TSG Hoffenheim	Villarreal, Spain
21:00 CET (UTC+1)	Ellingsen 41'; Gregersen (yellow card) 62'; Andersen 70'; Fofana 74'	Report	Dabbur 8', 28', (penalty missed) 63'; Baumgartner 45+3'	Stadium: Estadio de la Cerámica; Attendance: 0 Referee: Stéphanie Frappart (France)
Note: The match, originally to be played at the Aker Stadion in Molde, was moved to Estadio de la Cerámica in Villarreal, due to restrictions imposed by Norway on travelers from Germany out of concern of the COVID-19 variant B.1.1.7.

25 February 2021 Second leg	TSG Hoffenheim (Germany)	0–2 (3–5 agg.)	(Norway) Molde	Sinsheim, Germany
18:00 CET (UTC+1)	Rudy (yellow card) 83'	Report	Andersen 20', 90+5', (yellow card) 90+5'; Linde (yellow card) 73'; Ellingsen (yellow card) 83'	Stadium: Rhein-Neckar-Arena; Attendance: 0 Referee: Aleksei Kulbakov (Belarus)

== Statistics ==
=== Appearances and goals ===
No.	Pos	Nat	Player	Total		Bundesliga		DFB-Pokal		Europa League	
No.	Pos	Nat	Player	Apps	Goals	Apps	Goals	Apps	Goals	Apps	Goals
Goalkeepers
1	GK	(Germany) GER	Oliver Baumann	40	0	31	0	2	0	7	0
12	GK	(Germany) GER	Philipp Pentke	4	0	3	0	0	0	1	0
37	GK	(Germany) GER	Luca Philipp	0	0	0	0	0	0	0	0
Defenders
2	DF	(Netherlands) NED	Joshua Brenet	2	0	0+1	0	0+1	0	0	0
3	DF	(Czech Republic) CZE	Pavel Kadeřábek	23	0	17+3	0	1	0	1+1	0
4	DF	(Bosnia and Herzegovina) BIH	Ermin Bičakčić	3	1	2	1	1	0	0	0
5	DF	(Greece) GRE	Kostas Stafylidis	0	0	0	0	0	0	0	0
6	DF	(Norway) NOR	Håvard Nordtveit	17	0	6+6	0	1	0	2+2	0
15	DF	(Ghana) GHA	Kasim Nuhu	18	0	11+1	0	0+2	0	3+1	0
17	DF	(England) ENG	Ryan Sessegnon	29	2	17+6	2	1	0	3+2	0
21	DF	(Germany) GER	Benjamin Hübner	0	0	0	0	0	0	0	0
22	DF	(Germany) GER	Kevin Vogt	32	0	20+4	0	2	0	6	0
25	DF	(Nigeria) NGR	Kevin Akpoguma	22	2	14+2	1	2	1	4	0
28	DF	(United States) USA	Chris Richards	13	0	11	0	0	0	2	0
32	DF	(Netherlands) NED	Melayro Bogarde	14	0	2+7	0	0+1	0	3+1	0
38	DF	(Austria) AUT	Stefan Posch	30	0	25+1	0	1	0	3	0
42	DF	(Germany) GER	Alfons Amade	1	0	0	0	0	0	0+1	0
Midfielders
8	MF	(Germany) GER	Dennis Geiger	14	1	9	1	1	0	2+2	0
11	MF	(Austria) AUT	Florian Grillitsch	34	4	22+4	2	1	0	4+3	2
14	MF	(Austria) AUT	Christoph Baumgartner	41	9	28+3	6	2	0	5+3	3
16	MF	(Germany) GER	Sebastian Rudy	33	1	21+4	1	1	0	7	0
18	MF	(Mali) MLI	Diadie Samassékou	37	0	31	0	0	0	3+3	0
20	MF	(Serbia) SRB	Mijat Gaćinović	32	1	7+16	0	1+1	0	6+1	1
30	MF	(Germany) GER	Marco John	18	0	12+2	0	0	0	4	0
Forwards
9	FW	(Togo) TOG	Ihlas Bebou	40	9	23+9	9	2	0	4+2	0
10	FW	(Israel) ISR	Mu'nas Dabbur	30	10	11+11	4	1	0	6+1	6
19	FW	(Algeria) ALG	Ishak Belfodil	20	1	7+7	0	0+2	0	2+2	1
23	FW	(Armenia) ARM	Sargis Adamyan	23	4	3+15	2	0+1	0	0+4	2
27	FW	(Croatia) CRO	Andrej Kramarić	34	25	26+2	20	2	3	0+4	2
29	FW	(Denmark) DEN	Robert Skov	30	2	13+10	1	0+1	0	4+2	1
33	FW	(France) FRA	Georginio Rutter	11	1	2+7	1	0	0	0+2	0
35	FW	(Germany) GER	Maximilian Beier	5	2	0+3	0	0	0	2	2
Players transferred out during the season
7	FW	(Denmark) DEN	Jacob Bruun Larsen	3	0	1+1	0	0	0	0+1	0
33	FW	(Brazil) BRA	Klauss	10	0	0+4	0	0+1	0	4+1	0
41	MF	(Israel) ISR	Ilay Elmkies	0	0	0	0	0	0	0	0

Last updated: 22 May 2021
Source: Competitions

=== Goalscorers ===
As of matches played until 22 May 2021

Rank	No.	Pos.	Player	Bundesliga	DFB-Pokal	Europa League	Total
1	27	MF	(Croatia) Andrej Kramarić	20	3	2	25
2	10	FW	(Israel) Mu'nas Dabbur	4	0	6	10
3	9	FW	(Togo) Ihlas Bebou	9	0	0	9
3	14	MF	(Austria) Christoph Baumgartner	6	0	3	9
5	11	MF	(Austria) Florian Grillitsch	2	0	2	4
5	23	FW	(Armenia) Sargis Adamyan	2	0	2	4
7	17	DF	(England) Ryan Sessegnon	2	0	0	2
7	25	DF	(Nigeria) Kevin Akpoguma	1	1	0	2
7	29	FW	(Denmark) Robert Skov	1	0	1	2
7	35	FW	(Germany) Maximilian Beier	0	0	2	2
11	4	DF	(Bosnia and Herzegovina) Ermin Bičakčić	1	0	0	1
11	8	MF	(Germany) Dennis Geiger	1	0	0	1
11	16	MF	(Germany) Sebastian Rudy	1	0	0	1
11	19	FW	(Algeria) Ishak Belfodil	0	0	1	1
11	20	MF	(Serbia) Mijat Gaćinović	0	0	1	1
11	33	FW	(France) Georginio Rutter	1	0	0	1
Own goals				1	0	0	1
TOTAL				52	4	20	76
