= 2021–22 TSG 1899 Hoffenheim season =

TSG 1899 Hoffenheim
2021–22 season
- President: Kristian Baumgärtner (interim)
- Head coach: Sebastian Hoeneß
- Stadium: Rhein-Neckar-Arena
- Bundesliga: 9th
- DFB-Pokal: Round of 16
- Top goalscorer: League: Georginio Rutter (8); All: Andrej Kramarić; Georginio Rutter (8 each)
Home colours	Away colours	Third colours

The 2021–22 season was the 123rd season in the existence of TSG 1899 Hoffenheim and the club's 14th consecutive season in the top flight of German football. In addition to the domestic league, Hoffenheim participated in this season's edition of the DFB-Pokal.

== Players ==
=== First-team squad ===
As of 31 January 2022

Note: Flags indicate national team as defined under FIFA eligibility rules; some limited exceptions apply. Players may hold more than one non-FIFA nationality.

No.	Pos.	Nation	Player
1	GK	GER	Oliver Baumann (vice-captain)
3	DF	CZE	Pavel Kadeřábek
4	DF	BIH	Ermin Bičakčić
6	DF	NOR	Håvard Nordtveit
7	FW	DEN	Jacob Bruun Larsen
8	MF	GER	Dennis Geiger
9	FW	TOG	Ihlas Bebou
10	FW	ISR	Mu'nas Dabbur
11	MF	AUT	Florian Grillitsch
12	GK	GER	Philipp Pentke
13	MF	GER	Angelo Stiller
14	MF	AUT	Christoph Baumgartner
15	DF	GHA	Kasim Nuhu
16	MF	GER	Sebastian Rudy
17	DF	GER	David Raum

No.	Pos.	Nation	Player
18	MF	MLI	Diadie Samassékou
21	DF	GER	Benjamin Hübner (captain)
22	DF	GER	Kevin Vogt (3rd captain)
24	DF	USA	Justin Che (on loan from FC Dallas)
25	DF	NGR	Kevin Akpoguma
27	FW	CRO	Andrej Kramarić
28	DF	USA	Chris Richards (on loan from Bayern Munich)
29	FW	DEN	Robert Skov
30	MF	GER	Marco John
33	FW	FRA	Georginio Rutter
36	GK	GER	Nahuel Noll
37	GK	GER	Luca Philipp
38	DF	AUT	Stefan Posch
39	MF	GER	Tom Bischof
44	FW	GER	Fisnik Asllani

=== Players out on loan ===
Note: Flags indicate national team as defined under FIFA eligibility rules; some limited exceptions apply. Players may hold more than one non-FIFA nationality.

No.	Pos.	Nation	Player
—	FW	ARM	Sargis Adamyan (at Club Brugge until 30 June 2022)
—	FW	GER	Maximilian Beier (at Hannover 96 until 30 June 2022)
—	DF	NED	Melayro Bogarde (at FC Groningen until 30 June 2022)
—	MF	ISR	Ilay Elmkies (at Admira Wacker until 30 June 2022)
—	MF	SRB	Mijat Gaćinović (at Panathinaikos until 30 June 2022)
—	FW	BRA	Klauss (at Sint-Truiden until 30 June 2022)
—	FW	GER	David Otto (at Jahn Regensburg until 30 June 2022)
—	DF	BRA	Lucas Ribeiro (at Ceará until 31 December 2022)
—	DF	GRE	Kostas Stafylidis (at VfL Bochum until 30 June 2022)

== Transfers ==
=== Transfers in ===
Position	Player	Transferred from	Fee	Date	Source
MF	(Germany) Angelo Stiller	(Germany) Bayern Munich	Free	1 July 2021	
MF	(Germany) Sebastian Rudy	(Germany) Schalke 04	Free	1 July 2021	
MF	(Germany) David Raum	(Germany) Greuther Fürth	Free	1 July 2021	
DF	(United States) Chris Richards	(Germany) Bayern Munich	Loan	31 August 2021	
DF	(United States) Justin Che	(United States) FC Dallas	Loan	21 January 2022	

=== Transfers out ===
Position	Player	Transferred to	Fee	Date	Source
MF	(Israel) Ilay Elmkies	(Austria) Admira Wacker	Loan	1 July 2021	
DF	(Netherlands) Justin Hoogma	(Germany) Greuther Fürth	Loan	15 July 2021	
DF	(Greece) Konstantinos Stafylidis	(Germany) VfL Bochum	Loan	1 August 2021	
FW	(Germany) Maximilian Beier	(Germany) Hannover 96	Loan	19 August 2021	
FW	(Algeria) Ishak Belfodil	(Germany) Hertha BSC	€500,000	23 August 2021	
MF	(Brazil) Bruno Nazário	(Brazil) Vasco da Gama	Free	13 January 2022	
DF	(Netherlands) Melayro Bogarde	(Netherlands) FC Groningen	Loan	14 January 2022	
DF	(Brazil) Lucas Ribeiro	(Brazil) Ceará	Loan	18 January 2022	
DF	(Netherlands) Justin Hoogma	(Netherlands) Heracles Almelo	Undisclosed	24 January 2022	
FW	(Armenia) Sargis Adamyan	(Belgium) Club Brugge	Loan	31 January 2022	
DF	(Curaçao) Joshua Brenet	(Netherlands) FC Twente	Free	31 January 2022	
MF	(Serbia) Mijat Gaćinović	(Greece) Panathinaikos	Loan	31 January 2022	
FW	(Brazil) Klauss	(Belgium) Sint-Truiden	Loan	31 January 2022	

== Pre-season and friendlies ==
Win Draw Loss

17 July 2021 Friendly	1. FC Heidenheim	1–0	TSG Hoffenheim	Heidenheim, Germany
13:30 CEST (UTC+2)	Kleindienst 6'	Report		Stadium: Voith-Arena

24 July 2021 Friendly	TSG Hoffenheim	2–2	Greuther Fürth	Rottach-Egern, Germany
15:00 CEST (UTC+2)	Bruun Larsen 41'; Rutter 87'	Report	Hrgota 2'; Nielsen 37'	Stadium: Sportplatz Birkenmoos
Note: The match was played in four quarters 30 minutes each.

31 July 2021 Friendly	TSG Hoffenheim	3–1	Reims	Sinsheim, Germany
15:30 CEST (UTC+2)	Rudy 29'; Baumgartner 45+1'; Kramarić 68'	Report	Sierhuis 67'	Stadium: Rhein-Neckar-Arena; Attendance: 3,419

== Competitions ==
=== Overall record ===
Competition	First match	Last match	Starting round	Final position	Record							
Competition	First match	Last match	Starting round	Final position	Pld	W	D	L	GF	GA	GD	Win %
Bundesliga	14 August 2021	14 May 2022	Matchday 1	9th	34	13	7	14	58	60	−2	38.24
DFB-Pokal	9 August 2021	19 January 2022	First round	Round of 16	3	2	0	1	9	7	+2	66.67
Total					37	15	7	15	67	67	+0	40.54

Source: Soccerway

=== Bundesliga ===
==== League table ====
Pos	Team	Pld	W	D	L	GF	GA	GD	Pts	Qualification or relegation
7	1. FC Köln	34	14	10	10	52	49	+3	52	Qualification for the Europa Conference League play-off round (Note: Since the 2021–22 DFB-Pokal winners, RB Leipzig, qualified for the Champions League based on league position, the Europa League group stage spot was passed to the sixth-placed team, and the Europa Conference League play-off round spot was passed to the seventh-placed team.)
8	Mainz 05	34	13	7	14	50	45	+5	46	
9	1899 Hoffenheim	34	13	7	14	58	60	−2	46	
10	Borussia Mönchengladbach	34	12	9	13	54	61	−7	45	
11	Eintracht Frankfurt	34	10	12	12	45	49	−4	42	Qualification for the Champions League group stage (Note: Eintracht Frankfurt qualified for the Champions League group stage by winning the UEFA Europa League.)

Source: DFB
Rules for classification: 1) Points; 2) Goal difference; 3) Goals scored; 4) Head-to-head results; 5) Head-to-head away goals scored; 6) Away goals scored; 7) Play-off.

==== Results summary ====
Overall								Home						Away					
Pld	W	D	L	GF	GA	GD	Pts	W	D	L	GF	GA	GD	W	D	L	GF	GA	GD
34	13	7	14	58	60	−2	46	8	4	5	34	24	+10	5	3	9	24	36	−12

Source: DFB

==== Results by round ====
Round	1	2	3	4	5	6	7	8	9	10	11	12	13	14	15	16	17	18	19	20	21	22	23	24	25	26	27	28	29	30	31	32	33	34
Ground	A	H	A	H	A	H	A	H	A	H	A	H	A	H	A	A	H	H	A	H	A	H	A	H	A	H	A	H	A	H	A	H	H	A
Result	W	D	L	L	D	W	L	W	L	W	L	W	W	W	W	D	D	W	L	L	L	W	W	W	W	D	L	L	L	D	D	L	L	L
Position	2	2	9	9	10	9	11	9	11	9	10	10	5	5	4	4	5	3	4	7	8	5	5	6	4	6	6	6	6	8	8	8	8	9

Source: DFB
A = Away; H = Home; W = Win; D = Draw; L = Loss

==== Matches ====
The league fixtures were announced on 25 June 2021.

14 August 2021 1	FC Augsburg	0–4	TSG Hoffenheim	Augsburg
15:30 CEST (UTC+2)	Gouweleeuw (yellow card) 89'	Report	Raum (yellow card) 19'; Bruun Larsen 37'; Rudy (yellow card) 62', (goal) 90+5'; Adamyan 79'; Rutter 87'	Stadium: WWK Arena; Attendance: 9,124; Referee: Felix Brych

22 August 2021 2	TSG Hoffenheim	2–2	Union Berlin	Sinsheim
15:30 CEST (UTC+2)	Akpoguma 14'; Bruun Larsen 30'; Samassékou (yellow card) 80'	Report	Gießelmann 10'; Khedira (yellow card) 45'; Awoniyi 47'; Friedrich (yellow card) 82' (yellow-red card) 90+4'	Stadium: Rhein-Neckar-Arena; Attendance: 8,014; Referee: Sascha Stegemann

27 August 2021 3	Borussia Dortmund	3–2	TSG Hoffenheim	Dortmund
20:30 CEST (UTC+2)	Dahoud (yellow card) 36'; Reyna 49'; Meunier (yellow card) 54'; Bellingham 69'; Haaland 90+1'	Report	Baumgartner (yellow card) 1', (goal) 61'; Posch (yellow card) 7'; Geiger (yellow card) 20'; Dabbur 90'	Stadium: Signal Iduna Park; Attendance: 25,000; Referee: Felix Zwayer

11 September 2021 4	TSG Hoffenheim	0–2	Mainz 05	Sinsheim
15:30 CEST (UTC+2)	Gaćinović (yellow card) 39'; Vogt (yellow card) 70'	Report	Burkardt 21'; Ingvartsen 77'; Hack (yellow card) 86'	Stadium: Rhein-Neckar-Arena; Attendance: 8,427; Referee: Marco Fritz

18 September 2021 5	Arminia Bielefeld	0–0	TSG Hoffenheim	Bielefeld
15:30 CEST (UTC+2)	Wimmer (yellow card) 45'; Lasme (yellow card) 68'	Report	Kramarić (yellow card) 86'	Stadium: Bielefelder Alm; Attendance: 13,750; Referee: Patrick Ittrich

25 September 2021 6	TSG Hoffenheim	3–1	VfL Wolfsburg	Sinsheim
15:30 CEST (UTC+2)	Kramarić 45+2'; Kadeřábek (yellow card) 50', (goal) 82'; Baumgartner 74'; Grillitsch (yellow card) 78'	Report	Baku 25'; Arnold (yellow card) 78'; Roussillon (yellow card) 80'	Stadium: Rhein-Neckar-Arena; Attendance: 8,523; Referee: Daniel Siebert

2 October 2021 7	VfB Stuttgart	3–1	TSG Hoffenheim	Stuttgart
15:30 CEST (UTC+2)	Kempf 18'; Mavropanos 60'; Massimo 81'	Report	Samassékou (yellow card) 43'; Bruun Larsen 84'	Stadium: Mercedes-Benz Arena; Attendance: 24,211; Referee: Harm Osmers

15 October 2021 8	TSG Hoffenheim	5–0	1. FC Köln	Sinsheim
20:30 CEST (UTC+2)	Bebou 31', 49'; Kadeřábek (yellow card) 33'; Baumgartner 51'; Geiger 74'; Posch 87'	Report	Czichos (yellow card) 81'	Stadium: Rhein-Neckar-Arena; Attendance: 14,309; Referee: Tobias Reichel

23 October 2021 9	Bayern Munich	4–0	TSG Hoffenheim	Munich
15:30 CEST (UTC+2)	Gnabry 16'; Lewandowski 30'; Choupo-Moting 82'; Coman 87'	Report	Samassékou (yellow card) 10'; Rudy (yellow card) 60'; Raum (yellow card) 75'; Grillitsch (yellow card) 90+1'	Stadium: Allianz Arena; Attendance: 60,000; Referee: Matthias Jöllenbeck

29 October 2021 10	TSG Hoffenheim	2–0	Hertha BSC	Sinsheim
20:30 CEST (UTC+2)	Kramarić 19'; Rudy 36'; Akpoguma (yellow card) 66'; Vogt (yellow card) 75'	Report	Ascacíbar (yellow card) 75'; Boyata (red card) 76'	Stadium: Rhein-Neckar-Arena; Attendance: 8,127; Referee: Sven Jablonski

6 November 2021 11	VfL Bochum	2–0	TSG Hoffenheim	Bochum
15:30 CET (UTC+1)	Stafylidis (yellow card) 53'; Novothny 66'; Riemann (penalty missed) 75'; Pantović 90+7'	Report	Posch (yellow card) 29'; Vogt (yellow card) 38'; Grillitsch (yellow card) 73'; Kramarić (yellow card) 75'; Rudy (yellow card) 78'	Stadium: Vonovia Ruhrstadion; Attendance: 19,600; Referee: Frank Willenborg

20 November 2021 12	TSG Hoffenheim	2–0	RB Leipzig	Sinsheim
15:30 CET (UTC+1)	Samassékou 12'; Grillitsch (yellow card) 42'; Dabbur 68'; Nordtveit (yellow card) 90+3'	Report	Silva (yellow card) 35'; Angeliño (yellow card) 84'	Stadium: Rhein-Neckar-Arena; Attendance: 13,233; Referee: Tobias Welz

27 November 2021 13	Greuther Fürth	3–6	TSG Hoffenheim	Fürth
15:30 CET (UTC+1)	Leweling 22'; Tillman 46'; Christiansen (yellow card) 49'; Hrgota 68'	Report	Bebou 32', 62', 80'; Rutter 40', 58'; Meyerhöfer 66' (o.g.)	Stadium: Sportpark Ronhof; Attendance: 3,385; Referee: Bastian Dankert

4 December 2021 14	TSG Hoffenheim	3–2	Eintracht Frankfurt	Sinsheim
15:30 CET (UTC+1)	Geiger (yellow card) 6', (goal) 24'; Samassékou (yellow card) 19', (goal) 59'; Rutter 30'	Report	Borré 15'; Sow (yellow card) 29'; Paciência (yellow card) 64', (goal) 72'	Stadium: Rhein-Neckar-Arena; Attendance: 0 Referee: Daniel Schlager

11 December 2021 15	SC Freiburg	1–2	TSG Hoffenheim	Freiburg
15:30 CET (UTC+1)	Lienhart (yellow card) 16'; Schlotterbeck 21'; Grifo (penalty missed) 62'; Kübler (yellow card) 87'; Höler (yellow card) 90'; Günter (yellow card) 90'	Report	Raum 3'; Posch (yellow card) 38'; Akpoguma (yellow card) 61'; Vogt (yellow card) 80'; Richards 90+4'	Stadium: Europa-Park Stadion; Attendance: 750; Referee: Frank Willenborg

15 December 2021 16	Bayer Leverkusen	2–2	TSG Hoffenheim	Leverkusen
20:30 CET (UTC+1)	Diaby (yellow card) 21' (yellow-red card) 90+2'; Schick 37', 63'; Kossounou (yellow card) 60'; Tapsoba (yellow card) 85'; Hincapié (yellow card) 86'	Report	Rudy (yellow card) 21'; Raum (yellow card) 28'; Stiller 80'; Dabbur 83', (yellow card) 88'	Stadium: BayArena; Attendance: 13,272; Referee: Tobias Stieler

18 December 2021 17	TSG Hoffenheim	1–1	Borussia Mönchengladbach	Sinsheim
15:30 CET (UTC+1)	Kadeřábek (yellow card) 55'; Akpoguma 90+1'; Geiger (yellow card) 90+4'	Report	Embolo 35'; Bensebaini (yellow card) 62'; Lainer (yellow card) 90+4'	Stadium: Rhein-Neckar-Arena; Attendance: 750; Referee: Sven Jablonski

8 January 2022 18	TSG Hoffenheim	3–1	FC Augsburg	Sinsheim
15:30 CET (UTC+1)	Bebou 38', 44'; Baumgartner (yellow card) 75'; Raum 90+3'	Report	Gregoritsch 5'	Stadium: Rhein-Neckar-Arena; Attendance: 500; Referee: Benjamin Cortus

15 January 2022 19	Union Berlin	2–1	TSG Hoffenheim	Berlin
15:30 CET (UTC+1)	Voglsammer 22'; Prömel 73'	Report	Baumgartl 16' (o.g.); Akpoguma (yellow card) 28'; Dabbur (yellow card) 45+1'; Geiger (yellow card) 85'	Stadium: Stadion An der Alten Försterei; Attendance: 3,000; Referee: Martin Petersen

22 January 2022 20	TSG Hoffenheim	2–3	Borussia Dortmund	Sinsheim
15:30 CET (UTC+1)	Kramarić 45+1'; Rudy (yellow card) 66'; Rutter 77'; Dabbur (yellow card) 90+3'	Report	Haaland 6'; Hummels (yellow card) 49'; Reus 58'; Raum 66' (o.g.); Bellingham (yellow card) 90+5'	Stadium: Rhein-Neckar-Arena; Attendance: 500; Referee: Deniz Aytekin

5 February 2022 21	Mainz 05	2–0	TSG Hoffenheim	Mainz
15:30 CET (UTC+1)	Lee 79'; Niakhaté 83' (pen.)	Report	Hübner (yellow card) 17'; Rutter (yellow card) 74'	Stadium: Opel Arena; Attendance: 6,800; Referee: Christian Dingert

13 February 2022 22	TSG Hoffenheim	2–0	Arminia Bielefeld	Sinsheim
17:30 CET (UTC+1)	Hübner 22'; Geiger (yellow card) 45+1'; Rutter 51'; Grillitsch (yellow card) 90+5'	Report		Stadium: Rhein-Neckar-Arena; Attendance: 10,000; Referee: Robert Hartmann

19 February 2022 23	VfL Wolfsburg	1–2	TSG Hoffenheim	Wolfsburg
15:30 CET (UTC+1)	Philipp (yellow card) 11'; Wind 36'	Report	Bruun Larsen 74', (yellow card) 87'; Kramarić 78'; Raum (yellow card) 90+2'	Stadium: Volkswagen Arena; Attendance: 7,145; Referee: Felix Zwayer

25 February 2022 24	TSG Hoffenheim	2–1	VfB Stuttgart	Sinsheim
20:30 CET (UTC+1)	Geiger (yellow card) 16'; Baumgartner (yellow card) 33', (goal) 85', 90'; Hübner (yellow card) 45+4'	Report	Endo 58'; Anton (yellow card) 81'; Förster (yellow card) 90+6'	Stadium: Rhein-Neckar-Arena; Attendance: 18,099; Referee: Matthias Jöllenbeck

6 March 2022 25	1. FC Köln	0–1	TSG Hoffenheim	Cologne
17:30 CET (UTC+1)	Ljubičić (yellow card) 61'	Report	Posch 61'; Baumgartner (yellow card) 85'; Baumann (yellow card) 90+2'; Grillitsch (yellow card) 90+5'; Dabbur (yellow card) 90+5'	Stadium: RheinEnergieStadion; Attendance: 37,500; Referee: Marco Fritz

12 March 2022 26	TSG Hoffenheim	1–1	Bayern Munich	Sinsheim
15:30 CET (UTC+1)	Samassékou (yellow card) 30'; Baumgartner 32'; Grillitsch (yellow card) 38'; Rutter (yellow card) 45+1'; Posch (yellow card) 66'	Report	Hernandez (yellow card) 44'; Lewandowski 45+3'	Stadium: Rhein-Neckar-Arena; Attendance: 25,600; Referee: Robert Schröder

19 March 2022 27	Hertha BSC	3–0	TSG Hoffenheim	Berlin
15:30 CET (UTC+1)	Stark 39'; Pekarík (yellow card) 50'; Belfodil 63'; Tousart 74'; Dárdai (yellow card) 90+2'	Report	Akpoguma (yellow card) 55'	Stadium: Olympiastadion; Attendance: 25,000; Referee: Daniel Schlager

2 April 2022 28	TSG Hoffenheim	1–2	VfL Bochum	Sinsheim
15:30 CEST (UTC+2)	Akpoguma (yellow card) 45+1'; Raum (yellow card) 51', (goal) 54'; Vogt (yellow card) 90+2'	Report	Asano 28', 59'; Stafylidis (yellow card) 63'; Leitsch (yellow card) 80'	Stadium: Rhein-Neckar-Arena; Attendance: 15,014; Referee: Daniel Siebert

10 April 2022 29	RB Leipzig	3–0	TSG Hoffenheim	Leipzig
19:30 CEST (UTC+2)	Nkunku 5'; Halstenberg 20'; Szoboszlai 44'; Mukiele (yellow card) 76'	Report	Kadeřábek (yellow card) 71'; Richards (yellow card) 77'	Stadium: Red Bull Arena; Attendance: 35,112; Referee: Bastian Dankert

17 April 2022 30	TSG Hoffenheim	0–0	Greuther Fürth	Sinsheim
17:30 CEST (UTC+2)	Kadeřábek (yellow card) 18'; Baumgartner (yellow card) 54'; Vogt (yellow card) 60'	Report	Green (yellow card) 39'; Bauer (yellow card) 41'; Griesbeck (yellow card) 79'	Stadium: Rhein-Neckar-Arena; Attendance: 16,110; Referee: Felix Zwayer

23 April 2022 31	Eintracht Frankfurt	2–2	TSG Hoffenheim	Frankfurt
15:30 CEST (UTC+2)	Ndicka 32'; Borré (yellow card) 52'; Kamada 66'	Report	Ndicka 12' (o.g.); Posch (yellow card) 52'; Stiller (yellow card) 63'; Rutter 78'; Skov (yellow card) 90+1'	Stadium: Deutsche Bank Park; Attendance: 50,500; Referee: Sven Jablonski

30 April 2022 32	TSG Hoffenheim	3–4	SC Freiburg	Sinsheim
18:30 CEST (UTC+2)	Kramarić 32'; Samassékou (yellow card) 45'; Stiller 49'; Rudy 85'	Report	Sallai 23'; Günter 50'; Höler 70'; Jeong 73'	Stadium: Rhein-Neckar-Arena; Attendance: 23,627; Referee: Marco Fritz

7 May 2022 33	TSG Hoffenheim	2–4	Bayer Leverkusen	Sinsheim
15:30 CEST (UTC+2)	Rutter 22'; Baumgartner 36'; Dabbur (yellow card) 66'	Report	Schick 34', 76'; Diaby 73'; Alario 90+1'	Stadium: Rhein-Neckar-Arena; Attendance: 20,033; Referee: Frank Willenborg

14 May 2022 34	Borussia Mönchengladbach	5–1	TSG Hoffenheim	Mönchengladbach
15:30 CEST (UTC+2)	Stindl (yellow card) 10', (goal) 26'; Pléa 44' (pen.); Hofmann 45+1', 68'; Embolo 53'	Report	Kramarić 3'; Samassékou (yellow card) 31'; Vogt (yellow card) 60'	Stadium: Borussia-Park; Attendance: 50,395; Referee: Harm Osmers

=== DFB-Pokal ===
9 August 2021 First round	Viktoria Köln	2–3 (a.e.t.)	TSG Hoffenheim	Cologne
18:30 CEST (UTC+2)	Buballa (yellow card) 31'; Handle 33'; Greger (yellow card) 36', (goal) 102'; Amyn (yellow card) 45'	Report	Stiller (yellow card) 25'; Kramarić 27' (pen.), 107'; Baumgartner (yellow card) 31'; Akpoguma (yellow card) 63'; Dabbur 94'	Stadium: Sportpark Höhenberg; Attendance: 3,402; Referee: Franz Bokop

26 October 2021 Second round	TSG Hoffenheim	5–1	Holstein Kiel	Sinsheim
18:30 CEST (UTC+2)	Van den Bergh 3' (o.g.); Wahl 32' (o.g.); Akpoguma (yellow card) 46'; Stiller 59'; Dabbur 72'; Bruun Larsen 84'	Report	Neumann 47'; Lorenz (yellow card) 68'	Stadium: PreZero Arena; Attendance: 5,033; Referee: Robert Hartmann

19 January 2022 Round of 16	TSG Hoffenheim	1–4	SC Freiburg	Sinsheim
20:45 CET (UTC+1)	Richards (yellow card) 32'; N. Schlotterbeck 53' (o.g.); Geiger (yellow card) 79'	Report	Grifo 10', 36' (pen.); Schade (yellow card) 27', (goal) 55'; Demirović 68'	Stadium: PreZero Arena; Attendance: 500; Referee: Robert Schröder

== Statistics ==
=== Appearances and goals ===
No.	Pos	Nat	Player	Total		Bundesliga		DFB-Pokal	
No.	Pos	Nat	Player	Apps	Goals	Apps	Goals	Apps	Goals
Goalkeepers
1	GK	(Germany) GER	Oliver Baumann	35	0	33	0	2	0
12	GK	(Germany) GER	Philipp Pentke	2	0	1	0	1	0
36	GK	(Germany) GER	Nahuel Noel	0	0	0	0	0	0
37	GK	(Germany) GER	Luca Philipp	0	0	0	0	0	0
Defenders
3	DF	(Czech Republic) CZE	Pavel Kadeřábek	19	1	14+5	1	0	0
4	DF	(Bosnia and Herzegovina) BIH	Ermin Bičakčić	1	0	0+1	0	0	0
6	DF	(Norway) NOR	Håvard Nordtveit	11	0	1+10	0	0	0
15	DF	(Ghana) GHA	Kasim Nuhu	3	0	0+3	0	0	0
17	DF	(Germany) GER	David Raum	35	3	31+1	3	3	0
21	DF	(Germany) GER	Benjamin Hübner	6	1	5	1	0+1	0
22	DF	(Germany) GER	Kevin Vogt	33	0	29+1	0	3	0
24	DF	(United States) USA	Justin Che	2	0	0+2	0	0	0
25	DF	(Nigeria) NGR	Kevin Akpoguma	29	2	19+7	2	3	0
28	DF	(United States) USA	Chris Richards	21	1	12+7	1	2	0
38	DF	(Austria) AUT	Stefan Posch	31	2	26+2	2	2+1	0
Midfielders
8	MF	(Germany) GER	Dennis Geiger	22	2	17+3	2	2	0
11	MF	(Austria) AUT	Florian Grillitsch	18	0	16+2	0	0	0
13	MF	(Germany) GER	Angelo Stiller	29	3	18+8	2	3	1
14	MF	(Austria) AUT	Christoph Baumgartner	31	7	23+6	7	2	0
16	MF	(Germany) GER	Sebastian Rudy	24	3	7+14	3	1+2	0
18	MF	(Mali) MLI	Diadie Samassékou	25	2	21+3	2	0+1	0
30	MF	(Germany) GER	Marco John	3	0	0+2	0	0+1	0
39	MF	(Germany) GER	Tom Bischof	1	0	0+1	0	0	0
40	MF	(Germany) GER	Umut Tohumcu	1	0	0+1	0	0	0
Forwards
7	FW	(Denmark) DEN	Jacob Bruun Larsen	28	5	9+16	4	1+2	1
9	FW	(Togo) TOG	Ihlas Bebou	29	7	25+3	7	1	0
10	FW	(Israel) ISR	Mu'nas Dabbur	30	5	17+10	3	1+2	2
27	FW	(Croatia) CRO	Andrej Kramarić	35	9	30+2	6	2+1	3
29	FW	(Denmark) DEN	Robert Skov	13	0	3+9	0	0+1	0
33	FW	(France) FRA	Georginio Rutter	36	8	13+20	8	3	0
44	FW	(Germany) GER	Fisnik Asllani	2	0	0+2	0	0	0
45	FW	(Germany) GER	Nick Proschwitz	1	0	0+1	0	0	0
Players transferred out during the season
2	DF	(Curaçao) CUW	Joshua Brenet	0	0	0	0	0	0
19	FW	(Algeria) ALG	Ishak Belfodil	0	0	0	0	0	0
20	MF	(Serbia) SRB	Mijat Gaćinović	6	0	1+3	0	0+2	0
23	FW	(Armenia) ARM	Sargis Adamyan	14	1	2+11	1	0+1	0
32	DF	(Netherlands) NED	Melayro Bogarde	1	0	0	0	1	0
35	FW	(Germany) GER	Maximilian Beier	0	0	0	0	0	0

Last updated: 14 May 2022
Source: Competitions

=== Goalscorers ===
Rank	Pos	No.	Nat	Name	Bundesliga	DFB-Pokal	Total
1	FW	27	(Croatia)	Andrej Kramarić	6	3	9
2	FW	33	(France)	Georginio Rutter	8	0	8
3	FW	9	(Togo)	Ihlas Bebou	7	0	7
3	MF	14	(Austria)	Christoph Baumgartner	7	0	7
5	FW	7	(Denmark)	Jacob Bruun Larsen	4	1	5
5	FW	10	(Israel)	Mu'nas Dabbur	3	2	5
7	MF	13	(Germany)	Angelo Stiller	2	1	3
7	MF	16	(Germany)	Sebastian Rudy	3	0	3
7	DF	17	(Germany)	David Raum	3	0	3
10	MF	8	(Germany)	Dennis Geiger	2	0	2
10	MF	18	(Mali)	Diadie Samassékou	2	0	2
10	DF	25	(Nigeria)	Kevin Akpoguma	2	0	2
10	DF	38	(Austria)	Stefan Posch	2	0	2
14	DF	3	(Czech Republic)	Pavel Kadeřábek	1	0	1
14	DF	21	(Germany)	Benjamin Hübner	1	0	1
14	FW	23	(Armenia)	Sargis Adamyan	1	0	1
14	DF	28	(United States)	Chris Richards	1	0	1
Own goals					3	2	5
Totals					58	9	67

Last updated: 14 May 2022
