= Andrej Kramarić =

Croatian footballer (born 1991)

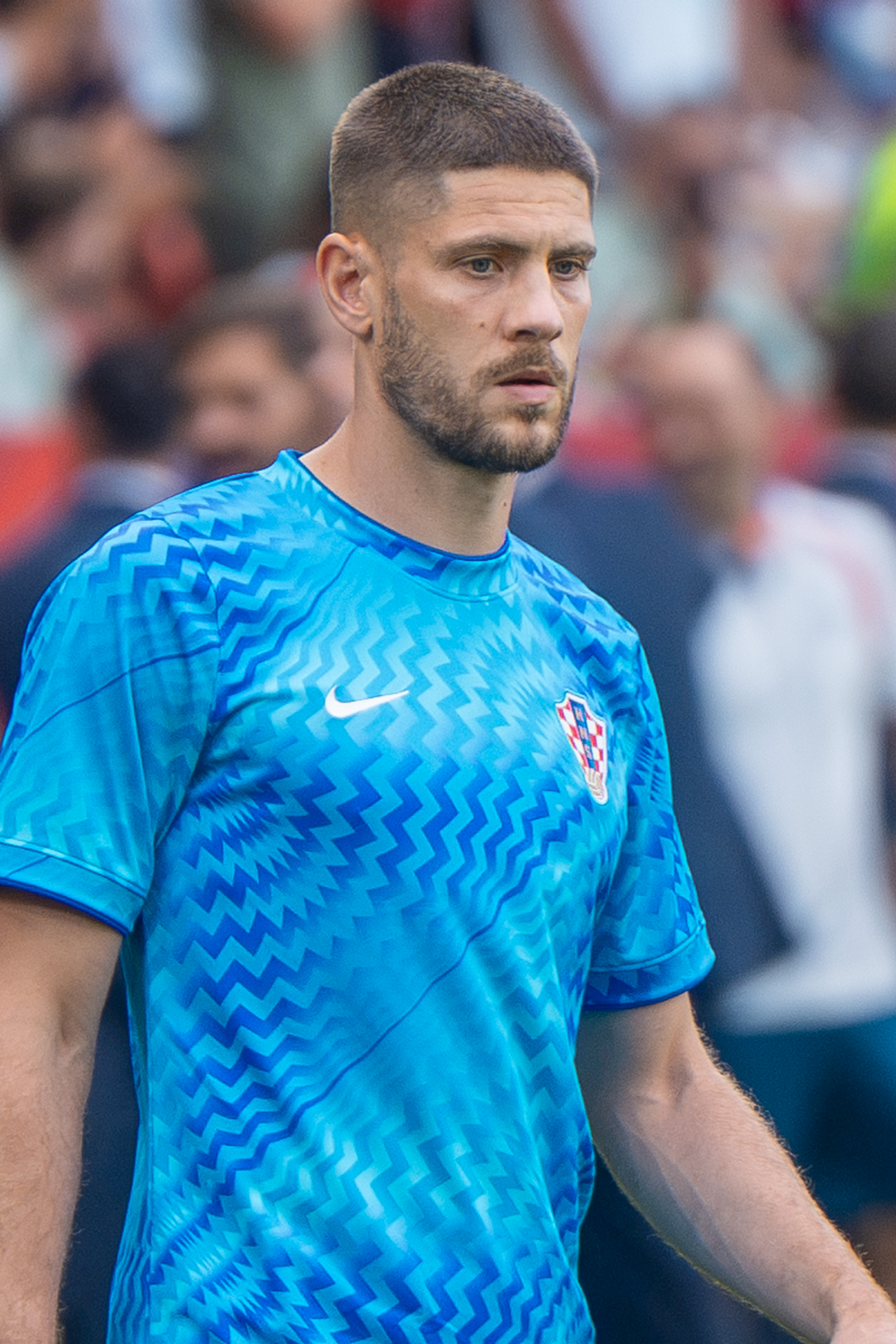
- Kramarić with Croatia in 2026

Personal information
- Full name: Andrej Kramarić
- Date of birth: 19 June 1991 (age 35)
- Place of birth: Zagreb, Croatia, Yugoslavia
- Height: 1.77 m (5 ft 10 in)
- Positions: Forward; attacking midfielder

Team information
- Current team: TSG Hoffenheim
- Number: 27

Youth career
- 1997–2009: Dinamo Zagreb

Senior career*
Years	Team	Apps	(Gls)
2009–2013	Dinamo Zagreb	42	(10)
2012–2013	→ Lokomotiva Zagreb (loan)	44	(20)
2013–2015	Rijeka	42	(37)
2015–2016	Leicester City	15	(2)
2016	→ TSG Hoffenheim (loan)	15	(5)
2016–	TSG Hoffenheim	312	(136)

International career^{‡}
2005	Croatia U14	2	(0)
2007	Croatia U16	7	(4)
2007–2008	Croatia U17	12	(6)
2008–2009	Croatia U18	9	(3)
2008–2010	Croatia U19	12	(3)
2011	Croatia U20	2	(1)
2009–2013	Croatia U21	9	(5)
2014–	Croatia	119	(36)
Medal record
Men's football
Representing Croatia
FIFA World Cup
Runner-up	2018 Russia
Third place	2022 Qatar
UEFA Nations League
Runner-up	2023 Netherlands
UEFA European Under-19 Championship
Bronze medal – third place	2010 France
- * Club domestic league appearances and goals as of 17:32, 31 October 2026 (UTC) ‡ National team caps and goals as of 19:10, 3 July 2026 (UTC)

Andrej Kramarić (Croatian pronunciation: [ǎndrej krǎmaritɕ]; born 19 June 1991) is a Croatian professional footballer who plays as a forward or attacking midfielder for Bundesliga club TSG Hoffenheim and the Croatia national team.

Kramarić started his football career in his hometown club Dinamo Zagreb and holds the record as the top youth goalscorer in the club's history. Hailed as one of the club's biggest talents, he made his first official appearance for Dinamo at the age of 17. In 2013, after he had a dispute with the Dinamo board of directors, Kramarić was transferred to HNK Rijeka, where he scored 37 times in 42 league games prior to his move to Leicester City for a record £9 million. He played a year-and-a-half there, spending time on loan at TSG Hoffenheim before moving there permanently. On 29 March 2019, he became the club's all-time top goalscorer. On 24 January 2021, he became the Bundesliga's all-time top Croatian goalscorer. On 15 January 2026, he became most capped Croatian player in the Bundesliga and Croatian player with most goals in professional career, surpassing Zvonimir Soldo and Davor Šuker respectively.

Kramarić was capped 53 times at various youth levels for Croatia, scoring 22 goals in total. He took part at the 2010 UEFA European Under-19 Championship, making four appearances for a Croatian team that reached the tournament semi-finals. He made his debut for the senior team in 2014, later taking part at three UEFA European Championships (in 2016, 2020 and 2024) and three FIFA World Cups (in 2018, 2022 and 2026), helping Croatia to reach the final of the 2018 tournament.

== Early life ==
Kramarić's parents, Josip and Danica, are from Bednja, a municipality in the region of Zagorje, where he spent much of his early childhood while his mother worked there as a local physician.

After graduating from the XVth gymnasium (MIOC) in Zagreb, he enrolled in the Faculty of Economics at the University of Zagreb, which he later put on hold due to his football career.

== Club career ==
=== Dinamo Zagreb ===
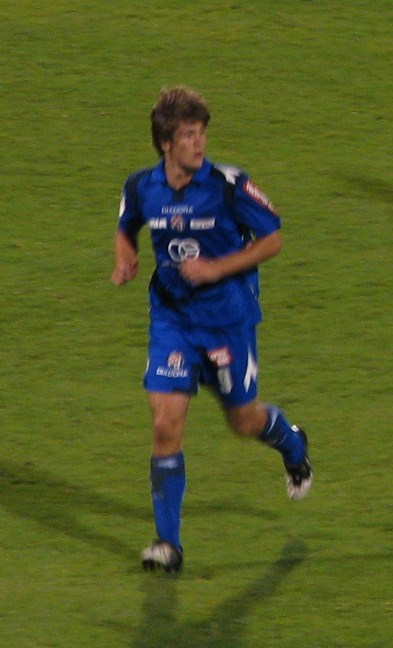
Kramarić playing for Dinamo Zagreb in 2009

Kramarić joined Dinamo Zagreb when he was just six years old. During his youth career, he scored over 450 goals for Dinamo youth teams, making him the top youth scorer in club history.

Kramarić made his debut for the Dinamo senior squad on 24 May 2009 in a league match against Zagreb. He made an appearance as a 69th-minute substitute for Josip Tadić. It was also his only match for the Dinamo first-team during the 2008–09 season.

Kramarić was promoted to the first-team squad the following season. He made his first appearance of the season and also debuted in the UEFA Champions League on 15 July in an away match against Pyunik, which finished in a goalless draw. Later that year, Kramarić won his first league title with Dinamo, scoring seven goals in 24 appearances en route. He also made five appearances in the 2009–10 Croatian Cup and scored four goals, and made five appearances in UEFA competitions. The following season turned out to be disappointing for Kramarić, however. With the arrival of new coach Vahid Halilhodžić, Kramarić was mostly used as a late substitute, rarely being used as a match starter. He managed to collect less than 600 minutes of playing time in 17 appearances he made throughout the 2010–11 season, scoring five goals in process. Despite the personal struggle, he won the league and cup double with his team.

In the first half of the 2011–12 season, Kramarić's status in the club did not change, as he collected only three appearances before the winter break, and the speculations about him leaving the club started to rise. In February 2012, it was announced that Kramarić would be loaned to Prva HNL team Lokomotiva Zagreb.

==== Lokomotiva Zagreb ====
In February 2012, Kramarić was loaned to Lokomotiva until the end of the season. At Lokomotiva, he became one of the most proficient strikers in Southeast Europe, scoring 20 goals in 44 league appearances in the season-and-a-half he spent with the Lokosi. In his first full season with Lokomotiva, he finished runner-up to Leon Benko in the Prva HNL top goalscorer race with 15 goals. He also helped his team reach the Croatian Cup final in where they were defeated by Hajduk Split.

==== Return to Dinamo Zagreb ====
There was great excitement when Kramarić returned to Dinamo Zagreb at the start of the 2013–14 season, with many pundits predicting that he would become the ruthless striker Dinamo had been lacking in recent years. He started his returning season coming on as a late substitute in a Croatian Supercup match where Dinamo secured their first trophy of the season by defeating Hajduk Split on penalties. But things for Kramarić did not go very well, as he found himself once again on the bench. He quickly became discouraged and complained to the press about his lack of playing time. This did not bode well with club director Zoran Mamić, who decided to put the young star on the transfer list.

=== Rijeka ===
Rijeka were the quickest to react to the falling out between Kramarić and Dinamo, securing his services on 31 August 2013. Kramarić debuted for the team on 15 September, playing in the starting line-up in a Prva HNL league match against Slaven Belupo, in which he also scored his first goal for the team in the 15th minute, the match's only goal. During a Croatian Cup match, Kramarić scored eight goals against BŠK Zmaj. In November 2013, he scored an astonishing goal against Lyon in the Europa League group stage. He scored his first hat-trick of the season against Istra 1961 in a match that ended 3–3, with Kramarić also missing a penalty. He then netted another goal against Rijeka's arch rivals Hajduk Split at the Stadion Poljud. Kramarić finished his first season with Rijeka by winning the Croatian Cup, and scoring 27 goals in all competitions. In July 2014, just before the start of the new season, Kramarić won the Croatian Supercup when Rijeka defeated his former club and reigning champions Dinamo Zagreb.

Kramarić opened the new season of the Prva HNL by scoring five goals in the opening two matches, including a hat-trick against Hajduk Split. By the end of October 2014, he had already scored more than 20 goals in all competitions, including a hat-trick in a Europa League match against Feyenoord. On 9 November, Kramarić scored five goals against Lokomotiva Zagreb in a home match that ended 6–0, a feat that was entered into league annals—for 14 years, no player had scored more than four goals in one match, and in history only two other players have managed to score that number.

=== Leicester City ===
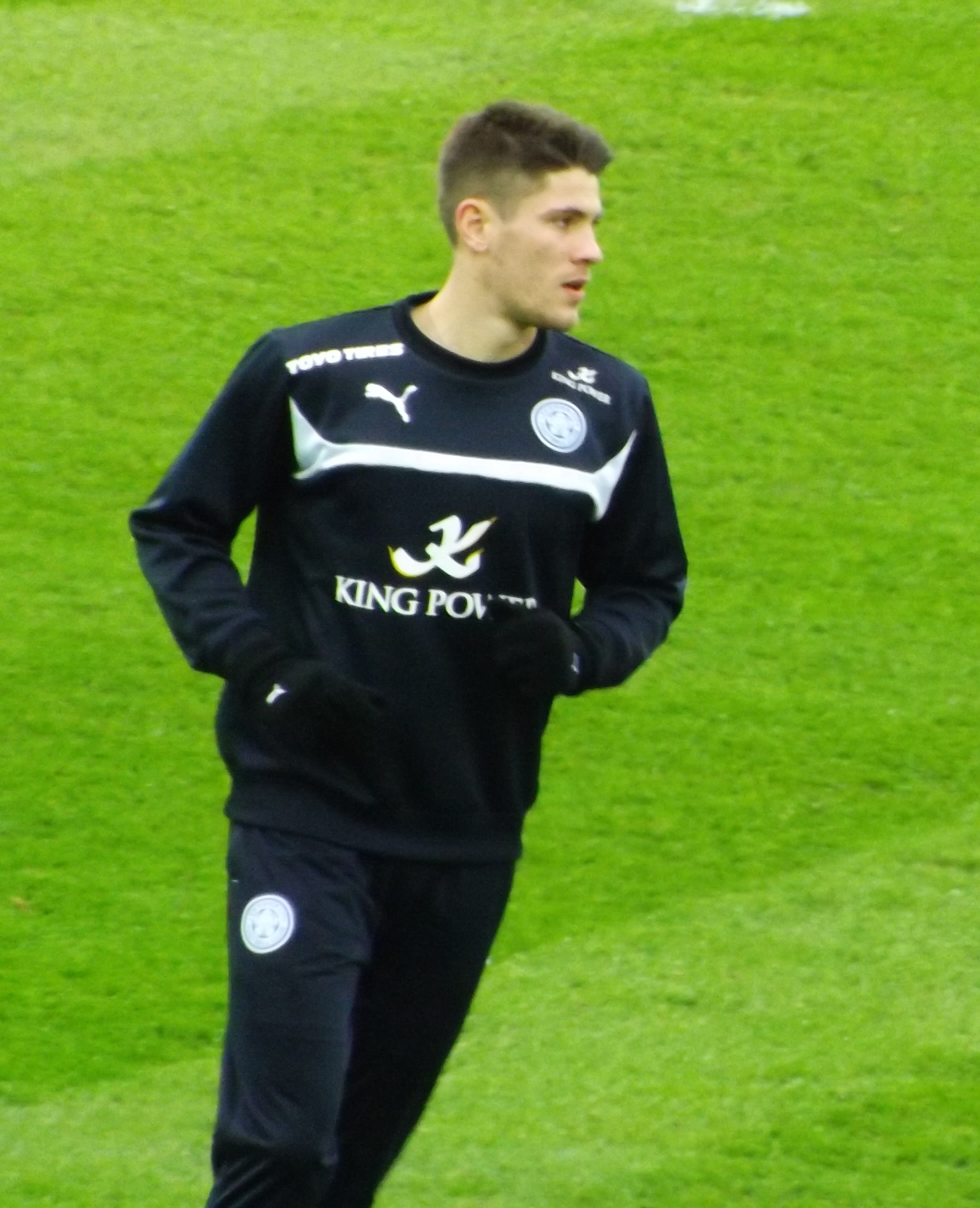
Kramarić warming up for Leicester City in 2015

On 8 January 2015, Premier League club Leicester City announced that they had agreed a deal to sign Kramarić on a three-and-a-half-year contract, confirming an earlier announcement by Rijeka. The transfer, however, was dependent on Kramarić being awarded a work permit on appeal, as he did not meet the requirements for one to be automatically granted. Four days after Leicester's announcement, an FA Panel recommended the approval of work permit, clearing the way for Leicester to apply to the UK Border Agency.

On 16 January, Leicester announced Kramarić had officially joined the club after being granted a UK work permit and that he would wear the number 40. His transfer fee was £9 million, a club record for Leicester. He made his debut the day after signing, replacing striker Jamie Vardy for the last 25 minutes of a 0–1 home defeat against Stoke City. On 10 February, Kramarić scored his first goal for the club in 2–1 away defeat against Arsenal.

Kramarić failed to establish a spot in the starting XI for the early stages of the 2015–16 season. He played only two league games when Leicester became Premier League champions, making him ineligible for a winner's medal (minimum five league games required).

=== TSG Hoffenheim ===
On 20 January 2016, Kramarić was loaned to Bundesliga club TSG Hoffenheim. He made his debut against Bayern Munich on 31 January, then scored his first goal in a draw with Werder Bremen, where he also was sent off in the 77th minute for accumulating two yellow cards. On 30 April he missed a penalty against Ingolstadt 04, however Hoffenheim won 2–1. On 25 May 2016, Kramarić signed for 1899 Hoffenheim on a four-year deal for an undisclosed fee.

In his debut season, he was Hoffenheim's 2016–17 season top-scorer with 18 goals (15 league goals). On 4 April, Kramarić scored a 21st-minute goal to give Hoffenheim the lead against German champions Bayern Munich, a game which Hoffenheim won 1–0. Kramarić was considered one of Hoffenheim's key players in their 2016–17 campaign in which they finished fourth, alongside Niklas Süle, Sandro Wagner, Ádám Szalai, and Sebastian Rudy.

On 23 October 2018, Kramarić scored a brace in a 3–3 draw against Lyon in the 2018–19 UEFA Champions League, then he managed to score a goal in each match of the return legs, against Lyon, Shakhtar Donetsk and Manchester City.

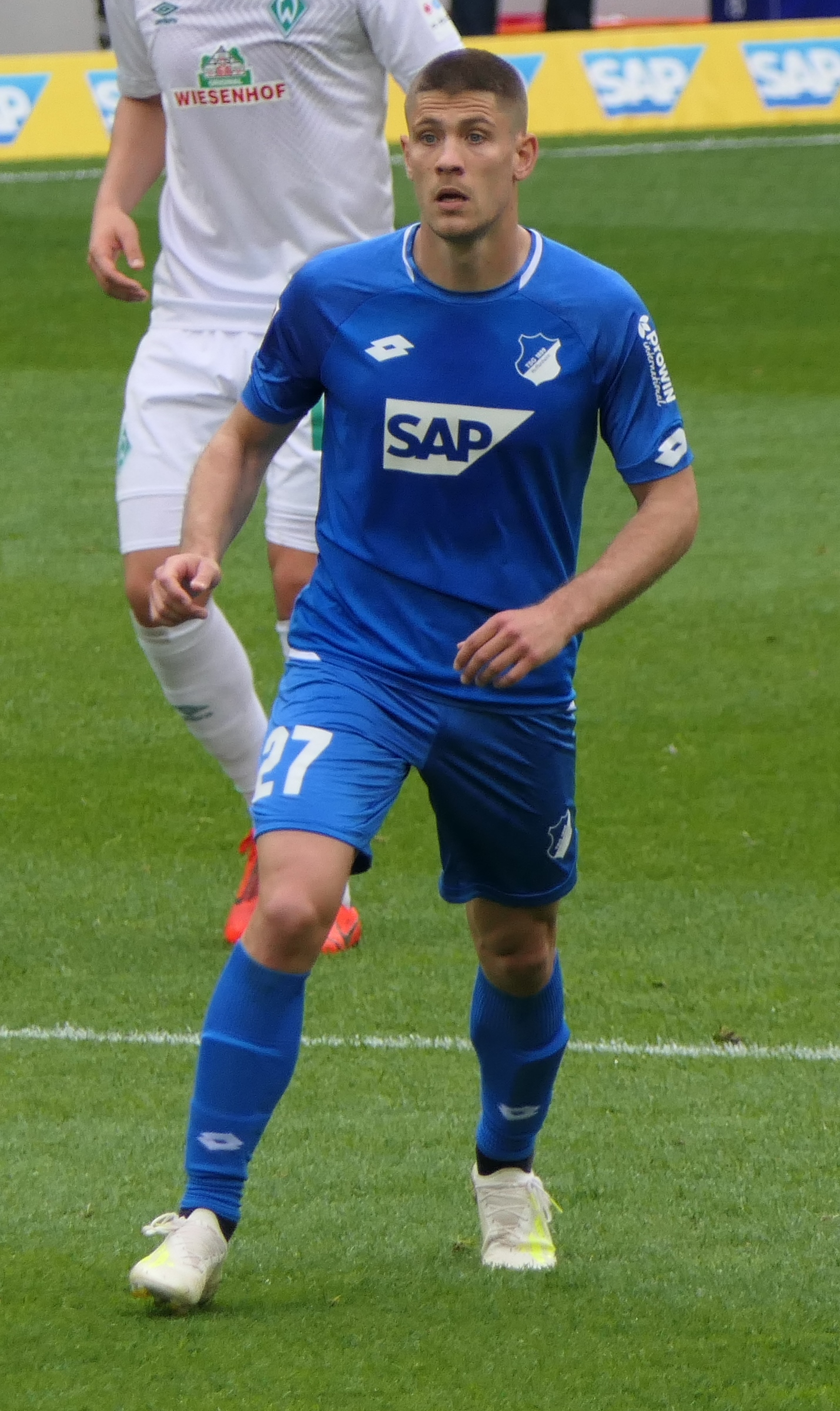
Kramarić with TSG Hoffenheim in 2019

On 29 March 2019, after scoring his forty-seventh goal for Hoffenheim in a 4–1 league victory over Bayer Leverkusen, Kramarić became the club's all-time Bundesliga top goalscorer, surpassing Sejad Salihović who scored 46. On 28 April, he missed a penalty against VfL Wolfsburg at result 1–0 for Hoffenheim and Wolfsburg turned the match over into a 4–1 victory, which left Hoffenheim four points behind fourth position, the last one which gives a chance to compete in the Champions League. It was his second league penalty miss for Hoffenheim, and third in total.

On 20 June 2020, Kramarić scored in a 4–0 victory over Union Berlin. On the last matchday, 27 June, he scored all four goals in a 4–0 away win against second-placed Borussia Dortmund, becoming the first Hoffenheim player to do so in a Bundesliga match. He also became the first player to score four against Dortmund away in a single game, surpassing Fritz Walter, Erhard Hofeditz and Gerd Müller who had managed to score three. The victory also secured Hoffenheim's sixth place league finish and qualification for the Europa League group stage.

On 13 September, Kramarić scored both goals in a DFB-Pokal 2–2 draw with Chemnitzer FC, and successfully converted a penalty in a shootout as Hoffenheim won 3–2. On 19 September, in Hoffenheim's first league game of the season, Kramarić scored a hat-trick in the 3–2 victory over Köln. That meant he scored nine goals in three consecutive games for the club, being the club's only goalscorer in all three of them. At the same time, he broke Mario Gómez's record of goals scored in consecutive 1. Bundesliga and 2. Bundesliga matches (7), scoring eight in four consecutive league games. On 27 September, he scored a brace in a 4–1 victory over German and European champions Bayern Munich, ending their 32-game unbeaten streak and 23-game winning streak in all competitions and inflicting the first defeat of the calendar year on them. On 16 October, he was named the Bundesliga Player of the Month. The same day, it was announced that he tested positive for COVID-19. On 24 January 2021, he surpassed Ivica Olić and became Bundesliga all-time top Croatian goalscorer after scoring a brace in a 3–0 victory over Köln and reaching the number of 74 goals. On 15 May, in a 1–1 draw with Arminia Bielefeld, he scored his 19th goal of the season, a record for a Hoffenheim player, surpassing Vedad Ibišević who scored 18 in the 2008–09 season.

On 22 January 2022, Kramarić scored his 100th goal for Hoffenheim in all competitions, by scoring the initial equalizer in a 3–2 home defeat against Borussia Dortmund. In the 2022–23 season, Kramarić reached two major milestones, scoring his 100th Bundesliga goal and providing his 50th assist for Hoffenheim in all competitions. On 20 May 2023, he scored his 99th and 100th goals, and provided the assist for the fourth goal, which was his 50th assist in a 4–2 victory over Union Berlin. This victory secured their stay in the top flight league. On the final matchday of the 2023–24 season, he scored three goals in a 4–2 win over Bayern Munich, becoming the third player to achieve a flawless hat-trick for the club, following Ishak Belfodil and Vedad Ibišević. On 13 December 2025, he featured in his 300th Bundesliga match with Hoffenheim in a 4–1 victory over Hamburg, becoming the fourth foreign player to achieve this feat with a single club after Dedé, Steve Cherundolo and Zvonimir Soldo.

== International career ==
=== Youth ===
Kramarić was capped a total of 53 times for various Croatian youth teams and scored 22 goals in return. His first national team appearance came against Bavaria national team on 31 March 2005. He was then playing for the under-14 team and was capped a total of two times. Kramarić then started competing at the under-16 and under-17 levels. He made a total of seven appearances in friendly matches for the under-16 team and scored four goals. For the under-17 team, he was capped 12 times and scored six goals. He also participated in all of under–17 team's qualifiers for the 2008 European U–17 Championship. At the under-18 level, Kramarić was capped nine times and scored three goals.

In 2008, he started playing for the under-19 team, with whom he reached he semi-finals of the 2010 UEFA European Under-19 Football Championship. He debuted and scored his first goal at under-21 level on 5 September 2009 in a European Championship qualifier against Norway, aged just 18 years and 81 days.

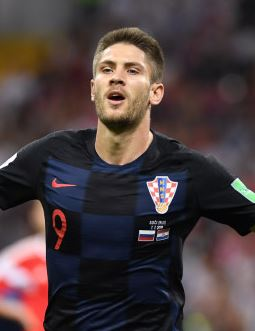
Kramarić playing for Croatia in 2018

=== Senior ===
On 20 August 2014, Kramarić received his first call-up for the Croatian senior squad under coach Niko Kovač for the friendly match against Cyprus and UEFA Euro 2016 qualifying match against Malta. He made his debut for Croatia on 4 September 2014 in a friendly match against Cyprus and provided an assist for Mario Mandžukić in 18th minute, receiving positive reviews from both critics and national team coach for his debut performance. Kramarić scored his first goal for Croatia in his competitive debut in the qualifying match against Malta. He scored his second goal against Azerbaijan on 13 October 2014.

On 9 October 2017, Kramarić scored two goals in a crucial 2018 FIFA World Cup qualifier against Ukraine, securing Croatia's qualification to playoffs. On 4 June 2018, he was included in Croatia's final World Cup squad. On 7 July, in the 2018 FIFA World Cup quarter-final match against hosts Russia, he scored Croatia's equaliser in the first half of regulation time. A 1–1 draw after 90 minutes saw the match go into extra-time, and following a 2–2 draw after 120 minutes of play, Croatia once again progressed to the next round in the ensuing shoot-out, winning 4–3 on penalties. He would later come on as a substitute in the final, where Croatia was defeated by France 4–2.

In the 2022 FIFA World Cup, Kramarić scored twice in a 4–1 victory against Canada in the group stage, as Croatia reached the semifinals and finished third. He would later be part of the Croatia squad that finished runners up in the 2022–23 UEFA Nations League. In the UEFA Euro 2024, he netted a goal in a 2–2 draw against Albania, becoming the third player to score in the tournament on his birthday following Jean-François Domergue in 1984 and Wesley Sneijder in 2008.

On 15 October 2024, he featured in his 100th international match for his nation in a 3–3 away draw with Poland during the UEFA Nations League.

On 18 May 2026, Kramarić was selected in the 26-man squad for the 2026 FIFA World Cup.

== Style of play ==
Kramarić has been described as versatile striker who is mobile enough to run behind defences and rather than waiting for crosses or ball to come to him, tends to run towards the ball, engulfing his opposition with an air of unpredictability about his play. Although naturally a lone striker, his versatility makes him able to play well as a winger or second striker. His former national team coach Niko Kovač compared him with legendary Croatian striker Davor Šuker. In May 2021, his former Hoffenheim coach Julian Nagelsmann named him the best player he had ever worked with.

== Personal life ==
He has been reported gifting sports equipment to the elementary school in Bednja, and held a flag displaying its name at the 2018 World Cup, during post-match celebrations.

On 31 March 2021, Kramarić married Mia Ćurković in a private ceremony at the Old City Hall in Zagreb Upper Town. In late August 2021, they became the parents of a son they named Viktor.

== Career statistics ==
=== Club ===
As of match played 31 October 2026

Appearances and goals by club, season and competition
Club	Season	League			National cup (Note: Includes Croatian Cup, FA Cup, DFB-Pokal)		League cup (Note: Includes Football League Cup)		Europe		Other		Total	
Club	Season	Division	Apps	Goals	Apps	Goals	Apps	Goals	Apps	Goals	Apps	Goals	Apps	Goals
Dinamo Zagreb	2008–09	Prva HNL	1	0	—		—		—		—		1	0
Dinamo Zagreb	2009–10	Prva HNL	24	7	5	4	—		5 (Note: Two appearances in UEFA Champions League, three appearances in UEFA Europa League)	0	—		34	11
Dinamo Zagreb	2010–11	Prva HNL	12	1	3	4	—		2 (Note: Appearances in UEFA Europa League)	0	—		17	5
Dinamo Zagreb	2011–12	Prva HNL	1	0	2	1	—		—		—		3	1
Dinamo Zagreb	2013–14	Prva HNL	4	2	—		—		3 (Note: Appearances in UEFA Champions League)	1	1 (Note: Appearance in Croatian Super Cup)	0	8	3
Dinamo Zagreb	Total		42	10	10	9	—		10	1	1	0	63	20
Lokomotiva Zagreb (loan)	2011–12	Prva HNL	13	5	—		—		—		—		13	5
Lokomotiva Zagreb (loan)	2012–13	Prva HNL	31	15	6	4	—		—		—		37	19
Lokomotiva Zagreb (loan)	Total		44	20	6	4	—		—		—		50	24
Rijeka	2013–14	Prva HNL	24	16	6	10	—		4	1	—		34	27
Rijeka	2014–15	Prva HNL	18	21	—		—		12	7	1	0	31	28
Rijeka	Total		42	37	6	10	—		16	8	1	0	65	55
Leicester City	2014–15	Premier League	13	2	2	1	—		—		—		15	3
Leicester City	2015–16	Premier League	2	0	—		3	1	—		—		5	1
Leicester City	Total		15	2	2	1	3	1	—		—		20	4
TSG Hoffenheim (loan)	2015–16	Bundesliga	15	5	—		—		—		—		15	5
TSG Hoffenheim	2016–17	Bundesliga	34	15	2	3	—		—		—		36	18
TSG Hoffenheim	2017–18	Bundesliga	34	13	2	0	—		6 (Note: Two appearances in UEFA Champions League, four appearances in UEFA Europa League)	0	—		42	13
TSG Hoffenheim	2018–19	Bundesliga	30	17	1	0	—		6	5	—		37	22
TSG Hoffenheim	2019–20	Bundesliga	19	12	1	0	—		—		—		20	12
TSG Hoffenheim	2020–21	Bundesliga	28	20	2	3	—		4	2	—		34	25
TSG Hoffenheim	2021–22	Bundesliga	32	6	3	2	—		—		—		35	8
TSG Hoffenheim	2022–23	Bundesliga	32	12	2	0	—		—		—		34	12
TSG Hoffenheim	2023–24	Bundesliga	30	15	1	2	—		—		—		31	17
TSG Hoffenheim	2024–25	Bundesliga	32	11	3	0	—		6	0	—		41	11
TSG Hoffenheim	2025–26	Bundesliga	34	14	2	1	—		—		—		36	15
TSG Hoffenheim	2026–27	Bundesliga	7	1	1	0	—		3	1	—		11	2
TSG Hoffenheim	Hoffenheim total		327	141	20	11	—		25	8	—		372	160
Career total			470	210	44	35	3	1	51	17	2	0	570	263

=== International ===
As of match played 2 July 2026

Appearances and goals by national team and year
National team	Year	Apps	Goals
Croatia	2014	4	2
Croatia	2015	5	1
Croatia	2016	10	2
Croatia	2017	8	3
Croatia	2018	15	4
Croatia	2019	4	1
Croatia	2020	4	1
Croatia	2021	15	2
Croatia	2022	16	6
Croatia	2023	8	5
Croatia	2024	13	3
Croatia	2025	10	6
Croatia	2026	7	0
Total		119	36

Croatia's score listed first, score column indicates score after each Kramarić goal.

List of international goals scored by Andrej Kramarić
No.	Date	Venue	Cap	Opponent	Score	Result	Competition
1	9 September 2014	Stadion Maksimir, Zagreb, Croatia	2	Malta	2–0	2–0	UEFA Euro 2016 qualifying
2	13 October 2014	Gradski Vrt Stadium, Osijek, Croatia	3	Azerbaijan	1–0	6–0	UEFA Euro 2016 qualifying
3	7 June 2015	Stadion Varteks, Varaždin, Croatia	6	Gibraltar	4–0	4–0	Friendly
4	27 May 2016	Stadion Koprivnica, Koprivnica, Croatia	10	Moldova	1–0	1–0	Friendly
5	15 November 2016	Windsor Park, Belfast, Northern Ireland	18	Northern Ireland	3–0	3–0	Friendly
6	9 October 2017	Olympic Stadium, Kyiv, Ukraine	25	Ukraine	1–0	2–0	2018 FIFA World Cup qualification
7	9 October 2017	Olympic Stadium, Kyiv, Ukraine	25	Ukraine	2–0	2–0	2018 FIFA World Cup qualification
8	9 November 2017	Stadion Maksimir, Zagreb, Croatia	26	Greece	4–1	4–1	2018 FIFA World Cup qualification
9	8 June 2018	Gradski Vrt Stadium, Osijek, Croatia	31	Senegal	2–1	2–1	Friendly
10	7 July 2018	Fisht Olympic Stadium, Sochi, Russia	36	Russia	1–1	2–2 (a.e.t.)	2018 FIFA World Cup
11	15 November 2018	Stadion Maksimir, Zagreb, Croatia	41	Spain	1–0	3–2	2018–19 UEFA Nations League A
12	18 November 2018	Wembley Stadium, London, England	42	England	1–0	1–2	2018–19 UEFA Nations League A
13	21 March 2019	Stadion Maksimir, Zagreb, Croatia	43	Azerbaijan	2–1	2–1	UEFA Euro 2020 qualifying
14	11 October 2020	Stadion Maksimir, Zagreb, Croatia	49	Sweden	2–1	2–1	2020–21 UEFA Nations League A
15	11 October 2021	Gradski Vrt Stadium, Osijek, Croatia	63	Slovakia	1–1	2–2	2022 FIFA World Cup qualification
16	11 November 2021	National Stadium, Ta' Qali, Malta	64	Malta	6–1	7–1	2022 FIFA World Cup qualification
17	26 March 2022	Education City Stadium, Al Rayyan, Qatar	66	Slovenia	1–0	1–1	Friendly
18	29 March 2022	Education City Stadium, Al Rayyan, Qatar	67	Bulgaria	2–1	2–1	Friendly
19	6 June 2022	Stadion Poljud, Split, Croatia	69	France	1–1	1–1	2022–23 UEFA Nations League A
20	16 November 2022	Prince Faisal bin Fahd Stadium, Riyadh, Saudi Arabia	74	Saudi Arabia	1–0	1–0	Friendly
21	27 November 2022	Khalifa International Stadium, Al Rayyan, Qatar	76	Canada	1–1	4–1	2022 FIFA World Cup
22	27 November 2022	Khalifa International Stadium, Al Rayyan, Qatar	76	Canada	3–1	4–1	2022 FIFA World Cup
23	25 March 2023	Stadion Poljud, Split, Croatia	82	Wales	1–0	1–1	UEFA Euro 2024 qualifying
24	14 June 2023	De Kuip, Rotterdam, Netherlands	84	Netherlands	1–1	4–2 (a.e.t.)	2023 UEFA Nations League Finals
25	8 September 2023	Stadion Rujevica, Rijeka, Croatia	86	Latvia	4–0	5–0	UEFA Euro 2024 qualifying
26	11 September 2023	Vazgen Sargsyan Republican Stadium, Yerevan, Armenia	87	Armenia	1–0	1–0	UEFA Euro 2024 qualifying
27	17 November 2023	Skonto, Riga, Latvia	88	Latvia	2–0	2–0	UEFA Euro 2024 qualifying
28	26 March 2024	Misr Stadium, New Capital, Egypt	91	Egypt	3–1	4–2	2024 FIFA Series
29	19 June 2024	Volksparkstadion, Hamburg, Germany	95	Albania	1–1	2–2	UEFA Euro 2024
30	12 October 2024	Stadion Maksimir, Zagreb, Croatia	99	Scotland	2–1	2–1	2024–25 UEFA Nations League A
31	6 June 2025	Estádio Algarve, Faro/Loulé, Portugal	105	Gibraltar	6–0	7–0	2026 FIFA World Cup qualification
32	6 June 2025	Estádio Algarve, Faro/Loulé, Portugal	105	Gibraltar	7–0	7–0	2026 FIFA World Cup qualification
33	9 June 2025	Opus Arena, Osijek, Croatia	106	Czech Republic	1–0	5–1	2026 FIFA World Cup qualification
34	9 June 2025	Opus Arena, Osijek, Croatia	106	Czech Republic	5–1	5–1	2026 FIFA World Cup qualification
35	5 September 2025	Tórsvøllur, Tórshavn, Faroe Islands	107	Faroe Islands	1–0	1–0	2026 FIFA World Cup qualification
36	8 September 2025	Stadion Maksimir, Zagreb, Croatia	108	Montenegro	2–0	4–0	2026 FIFA World Cup qualification

== Honours ==
Dinamo Zagreb

- Prva HNL: 2009–10, 2010–11
- Croatian Cup: 2010–11
- Croatian Super Cup: 2013

Rijeka

- Croatian Cup: 2013–14
- Croatian Super Cup: 2014

Croatia

- FIFA World Cup runner-up: 2018; third place: 2022
- UEFA Nations League runner-up: 2022–23

Individual

- Prva HNL Player of the Year: 2014
- Football Oscar Team of the Year: 2013, 2014
- Ivica Jobo Kurtini Award: 2014
- Prva HNL Top goalscorer: 2014–15
- Croatian Cup Top goalscorer: 2013–14
- Hoffenheim Player of the Season: 2016–17
- Honorary citizen of Bednja (2019)
- Bundesliga Player of the Month: September 2020

Orders

- Order of Duke Branimir: 2018
