= Philipp Pentke =

German footballer

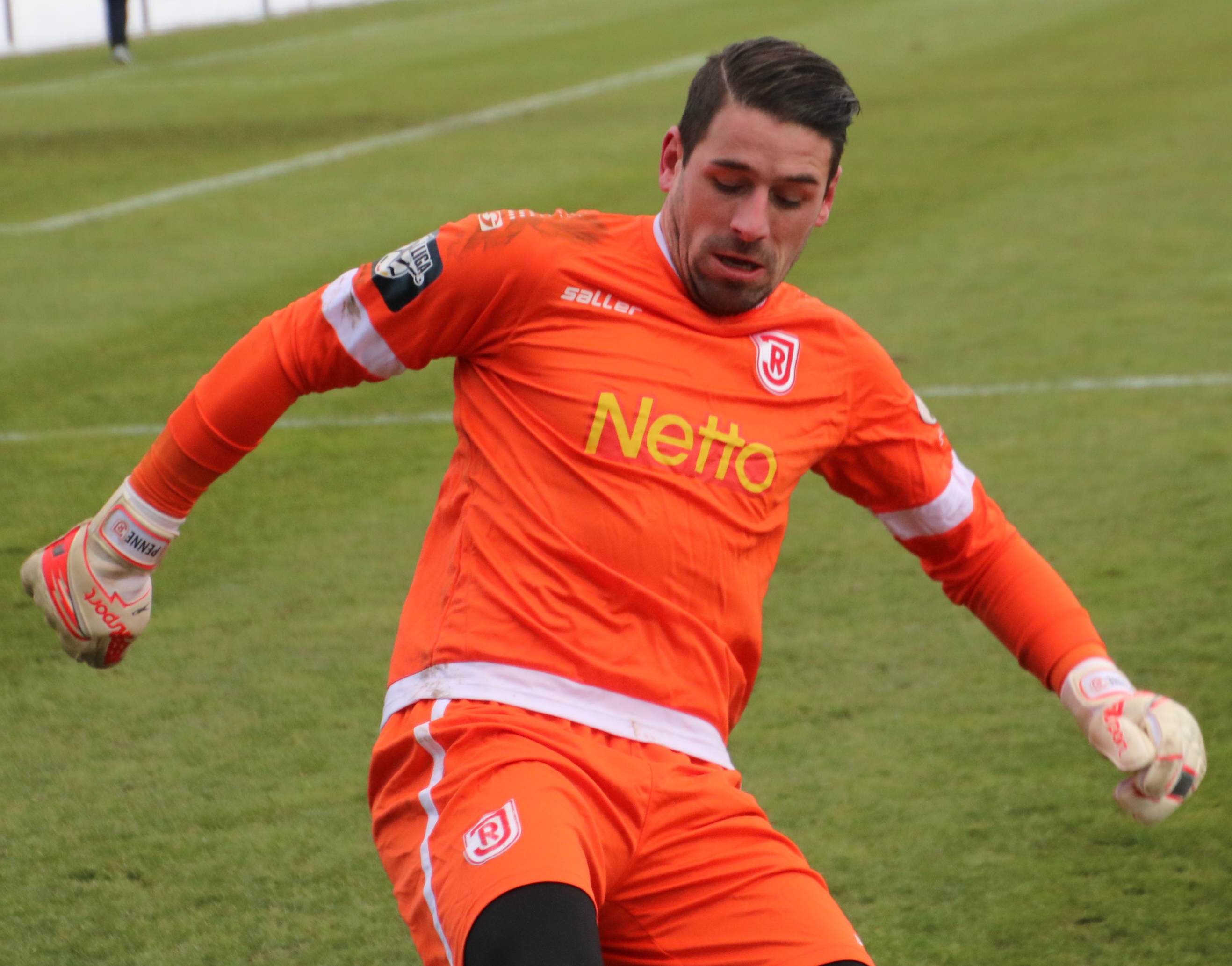
- Pentke in 2017

Personal information
- Date of birth: 1 May 1985 (age 41)
- Place of birth: Freiberg, East Germany
- Height: 1.91 m (6 ft 3 in)
- Position: Goalkeeper

Youth career
- 1997–2001: BSC Freiberg
- 2001–2003: Dynamo Dresden

Senior career*
Years	Team	Apps	(Gls)
2003–2007	1860 Munich II	40	(0)
2007–2008	FC Augsburg	0	(0)
2008–2009	Energie Cottbus II	30	(0)
2009–2015	Chemnitzer FC	183	(0)
2015–2019	Jahn Regensburg	130	(0)
2019–2023	TSG Hoffenheim	8	(0)
2023–2025	FC Köln	0	(0)
- * Club domestic league appearances and goals as of 18 May 2025

Philipp Pentke (born 1 May 1985) is a German footballer who plays as a goalkeeper.

== Career ==
Pentke played for the youth team of BSC Freiberg before moving to Dynamo Dresden in 2001. In 2004, he joined TSV 1860 Munich on a free transfer but he did not make it in the first team and only played for the reserves. After three years, he joined FC Augsburg but again did not play for the first team. In 2008, he transferred to Energie Cottbus II as third goalkeeper. After one year without playing, he joined Chemnitzer FC where he was a regular starter and played 183 matches.

At the end of the 2014–15 season, Chemnitz told Pentke that they would not extend his contract and so he joined Jahn Regensburg who played at that time in the Regionalliga Bayern. From the beginning of the season, he was first goalkeeper and helped Regensburg to get promoted to the 3. Liga. In the next season, Regensburg reached the play-offs to the 2. Bundesliga against TSV 1860 Munich. In the second leg of the play-offs in the Allianz Arena, supporters of 1860 behind the goal of Pentke started to rip out seats and to throw them in onto the pitch. Pentke had to avoid these objects while playing. Nevertheless, Regensburg won promotion to the 2. Bundesliga.

On 1 August 2023, Pentke signed a one-year contract with FC Köln.

== Career statistics ==
As of match played 27 November 2021

Appearances and goals by club, season and competition
Club	Season	League			Cup		Continental		Other		Total	
Club	Season	Division	Apps	Goals	Apps	Goals	Apps	Goals	Apps	Goals	Apps	Goals
1860 Munich II	2004–05	Regionalliga	16	0	1	0	—		—		16	0
1860 Munich II	2005–06	Regionalliga	20	0	—		—		—		20	0
1860 Munich II	2006–07	Regionalliga	4	0	—		—		—		4	0
1860 Munich II	Total		40	0	—		—		—		40	0
FC Augsburg	2007–08	2. Bundesliga	0	0	0	0	—		—		0	0
Energie Cottbus II	2008–09	Regionalliga	30	0	—		—		—		30	0
Chemnitzer FC	2009–10	Regionalliga	26	0	—		—		—		26	0
Chemnitzer FC	2010–11	Regionalliga	21	0	2	0	—		—		23	0
Chemnitzer FC	2011–12	3. Liga	38	0	—		—		—		38	0
Chemnitzer FC	2012–13	3. Liga	31	0	1	0	—		—		32	0
Chemnitzer FC	2013–14	3. Liga	34	0	—		—		—		34	0
Chemnitzer FC	2014–15	3. Liga	33	0	2	0	—		—		35	0
Chemnitzer FC	Total		183	0	5	0	—		—		188	0
Jahn Regensburg	2015–16	Regionalliga	36	0	—		—		—		36	0
Jahn Regensburg	2016–17	3. Liga	38	0	1	0	—		2	0	41	0
Jahn Regensburg	2017–18	2. Bundesliga	28	0	2	0	—		—		30	0
Jahn Regensburg	2018–19	2. Bundesliga	30	0	0	0	—		—		30	0
Jahn Regensburg	Total		132	0	3	0	—		2	0	137	0
TSG Hoffenheim	2019–20	Bundesliga	4	0	2	0	—		—		6	0
TSG Hoffenheim	2020–21	Bundesliga	3	0	0	0	1	0	—		4	0
TSG Hoffenheim	2021–22	Bundesliga	1	0	1	0	—		—		2	0
TSG Hoffenheim	2022–23	Bundesliga	0	0	0	0	—		—		0	0
TSG Hoffenheim	Total		8	0	3	0	1	0	—		12	0
FC Köln	2023–24	Bundesliga	0	0	0	0	—		—		0	0
Career total			393	0	12	0	1	0	2	0	408	0

== Honours ==
1.FC Koln

- 2.Bundesliga: 2024–25
