= Diadie Samassékou =

Malian footballer (born 1996)

- Samassékou with Houston Dynamo FC in 2026

Personal information
- Date of birth: 11 January 1996 (age 30)
- Place of birth: Bamako, Mali
- Height: 1.77 m (5 ft 10 in)
- Position: Defensive midfielder

Team information
- Current team: Houston Dynamo
- Number: 18

Youth career
- –2015: Real Bamako

Senior career*
Years	Team	Apps	(Gls)
2015–2016	Liefering	26	(0)
2016–2019	Red Bull Salzburg	83	(1)
2019–2025	TSG Hoffenheim	87	(2)
2022–2023	→ Olympiacos (loan)	20	(2)
2024	→ Cádiz (loan)	4	(0)
2025–	Houston Dynamo	28	(0)

International career^{‡}
2015	Mali U20	9	(2)
2015–2016	Mali U23	4	(0)
2016–	Mali	41	(1)
Medal record
Representing Mali
FIFA U-20 World Cup
Third place	2015 New Zealand	U-20 Team
- * Club domestic league appearances and goals as of 2 November 2026 ‡ National team caps and goals as of 23 August 2025

Diadie Samassékou (born 11 January 1996) is a Malian professional footballer who plays as a defensive midfielder for Major League Soccer side Houston Dynamo and the Mali national team.

== Club career ==
=== Red Bull Salzburg ===
In August 2015, Samassékou signed a four-year contract with Red Bull Salzburg, initially joining their farm team FC Liefering. During the 2017–18 season Salzburg had their best ever European campaign. They finished top of their Europa League group, for a record fourth time, before beating Real Sociedad and Borussia Dortmund thus making their first ever appearance in the UEFA Europa League semi-final. On 3 May 2018, he played in the Europa League semi-finals as Olympique de Marseille played out a 1–2 away loss but a 3–2 aggregate win to secure a place in the 2018 UEFA Europa League Final.

=== TSG Hoffenheim ===
On 15 August 2019, TSG Hoffenheim announced the signing of Samassékou on a five-year deal.

On 1 February 2024, Samassékou joined Cádiz in Spain on loan.

=== Houston Dynamo ===
On 23 August 2025, signed a one-and-a-half year deal with Major League Soccer side Houston Dynamo.

== International career ==
Samassékou represented Mali at youth level at the 2015 FIFA U-20 World Cup and the 2016 Toulon Tournament. He made his debut for the senior team in a 3–1 friendly win against China PR on 29 June 2014.

He competes for his first international competition in the 2019 Africa Cup of Nations.

In December 2021, Samassékou was selected by coach Mohamed Magassouba to participate in the 2021 Africa Cup of Nations.

On 2 January 2024 he was selected from the list of 27 Malian players selected by Éric Chelle to compete in the 2023 Africa Cup of Nations.

== Career statistics ==
=== Club ===
As of match played 9 March 2025

Appearances and goals by club, season and competition
Club	Season	League			National Cup		Continental		Total	
Club	Season	Division	Apps	Goals	Apps	Goals	Apps	Goals	Apps	Goals
Liefering	2015–16	Erste Liga	25	0	–		–		25	0
Liefering	2016–17	Erste Liga	1	0	–		–		1	0
Liefering	Total		26	0	–		–		26	0
Red Bull Salzburg	2016–17	Austrian Bundesliga	27	0	4	0	7	0	38	0
Red Bull Salzburg	2017–18	Austrian Bundesliga	29	0	3	0	18	0	50	0
Red Bull Salzburg	2018–19	Austrian Bundesliga	26	1	5	0	14	1	45	2
Red Bull Salzburg	2019–20	Austrian Bundesliga	1	0	0	0	0	0	1	0
Red Bull Salzburg	Total		83	1	12	0	39	1	134	2
TSG Hoffenheim	2019–20	Bundesliga	21	0	0	0	–		21	0
TSG Hoffenheim	2020–21	Bundesliga	31	0	0	0	6	0	37	0
TSG Hoffenheim	2021–22	Bundesliga	24	2	1	0	–		25	2
TSG Hoffenheim	2022–23	Bundesliga	2	0	1	0	–		3	0
TSG Hoffenheim	2023–24	Bundesliga	1	0	0	0	–		1	0
TSG Hoffenheim	2024–25	Bundesliga	8	0	1	0	1	0	10	0
TSG Hoffenheim	Total		87	2	3	0	7	0	97	2
Olympiacos (loan)	2022–23	Super League Greece	20	2	5	0	–		25	2
Cádiz (loan)	2023–24	La Liga	4	0	–		–		4	0
Career total			220	5	20	0	46	1	286	6

=== International ===
As of match played 6 June 2024.

Mali
Year	Apps	Goals
2016	2	0
2017	2	0
2018	4	0
2019	8	1
2020	1	0
2021	5	0
2022	8	0
2023	5	0
2024	4	0
Total	39	1

==== International goals ====
Scores and results list Mali's goal tally first.

No.	Date	Venue	Opponent	Score	Result	Competition
1.	27 June 2019	Suez Stadium, Suez, Egypt	Tunisia	1–0	1–1	2019 Africa Cup of Nations

== Honours ==
Red Bull Salzburg

- Austrian Bundesliga 2016–17, 2017–18, 2018–19
- Austrian Cup: 2016–17, 2018–19

Individual

- Austrian Bundesliga Team of the Year: 2017–18, 2018–19
- UEFA Europa League Squad of the Season: 2017–18
