= Dennis Geiger (footballer, born 1998) =

German footballer

Personal information
- Date of birth: 10 June 1998 (age 28)
- Place of birth: Mosbach, Germany
- Height: 1.73 m (5 ft 8 in)
- Position: Midfielder

Team information
- Current team: NEC
- Number: 18

Youth career
- 2009–2016: TSG Hoffenheim

Senior career*
| Years | Team | Apps | (Gls) |
| 2016–2018 | TSG Hoffenheim II | 28 | (5) |
| 2017–2026 | TSG Hoffenheim | 125 | (6) |
| 2026 | → Aberdeen (loan) | 11 | (1) |
| 2026– | NEC | 5 | (0) |

International career^{‡}
| 2012–2013 | Germany U15 | 7 | (1) |
| 2013–2014 | Germany U16 | 10 | (0) |
| 2014–2015 | Germany U17 | 5 | (0) |
| 2016–2017 | Germany U19 | 12 | (0) |
| 2019–2020 | Germany U21 | 5 | (0) |
- * Club domestic league appearances and goals as of 18 October 2026 ‡ National team caps and goals as of 9 October 2020

Dennis Geiger (born 10 June 1998) is a German professional footballer who plays as a midfielder for Eredivisie club NEC.

== Early life ==
Geiger was born in Mosbach, Baden-Württemberg and plays for Hoffenheim. He played for Alemannia Sattelbach from 2008-2009 and has played for 1899 Hoffenheim since 2009.

== Club career ==
=== Hoffenheim ===
Geiger signed his professional contract with Hoffenheim in January 2017, he represented them from U12s and has represented Germany at all levels from the U15. In May of 2015, he finished second with the Germany U17 at the European Championships in Bulgaria. In spring of 2016, he played a big role in TSG U19s' run to the final of the German Championship. In the final itself, he scored the 1-1 equaliser in the 5-3 loss to Borussia Dortmund.

On 19 August 2017, he made his professional debut in a win over Werder Bremen. He also made his UEFA Europa League debut on the same month.

==== Loan to Aberdeen ====
On 2 February 2026, Geiger joined Aberdeen in Scotland on loan with an option to buy. On 21 February 2026, against Motherwell, he was sent off for a dangerous tackle.

=== NEC Nijmegen ===
On 28 August 2026, Geiger mutually terminated his contract with Hoffenheim and joined Eredivisie side NEC on a two-year contract.

== Style of play ==
Described as a holding midfielder, Geiger - in the reserves at the time was a surprising choice to Hoffenheim fans.

== Career statistics ==
As of 22 October 2026

Appearances and goals by club, season and competition
| Club | Season | League | | | Cup | | Europe | | Other | | Total | |
| Club | Season | Division | Apps | Goals | Apps | Goals | Apps | Goals | Apps | Goals | Apps | Goals |
|---|---|---|---|---|---|---|---|---|---|---|---|---|
| 1899 Hoffenheim II | 2016–17 | Regionalliga Südwest | 25 | 5 | — | | — | | — | | 25 | 5 |
| 1899 Hoffenheim II | 2018–19 | Regionalliga Südwest | 3 | 0 | — | | — | | — | | 3 | 0 |
| 1899 Hoffenheim II | Total | | 28 | 5 | — | | — | | — | | 28 | 5 |
| 1899 Hoffenheim | 2017–18 | Bundesliga | 21 | 2 | 1 | 0 | 5 (Note: One appearance in UEFA Champions League, four appearance in UEFA Europa League) | 0 | — | | 27 | 2 |
| 1899 Hoffenheim | 2018–19 | Bundesliga | 4 | 0 | 0 | 0 | 1 (Note: Appearance in UEFA Champions League) | 0 | — | | 5 | 0 |
| 1899 Hoffenheim | 2019–20 | Bundesliga | 21 | 0 | 2 | 0 | — | | — | | 23 | 0 |
| 1899 Hoffenheim | 2020–21 | Bundesliga | 9 | 1 | 1 | 0 | 4 (Note: Appearances in UEFA Europa League) | 0 | — | | 14 | 1 |
| 1899 Hoffenheim | 2021–22 | Bundesliga | 20 | 2 | 2 | 0 | — | | — | | 22 | 2 |
| 1899 Hoffenheim | 2022–23 | Bundesliga | 27 | 1 | 1 | 0 | — | | — | | 28 | 1 |
| 1899 Hoffenheim | 2023–24 | Bundesliga | 3 | 0 | — | | — | | — | | 3 | 0 |
| 1899 Hoffenheim | 2024–25 | Bundesliga | 18 | 0 | 2 | 0 | 3 | 0 | — | | 23 | 0 |
| 1899 Hoffenheim | 2025–26 | Bundesliga | 0 | 0 | 0 | 0 | 0 | 0 | — | | 0 | 0 |
| 1899 Hoffenheim | Total | | 123 | 6 | 9 | 0 | 13 | 1 | — | | 145 | 7 |
| Aberdeen (loan) | 2025–26 | Scottish Premiership | 11 | 1 | 1 | 0 | 0 | 0 | — | | 12 | 1 |
| NEC | 2026–27 | Eredivisie | 5 | 0 | 0 | 0 | 3 | 0 | — | | 8 | 0 |
| Career total | | | 167 | 12 | 10 | 0 | 16 | 1 | 0 | 0 | 193 | 13 |
