= Kevin Akpoguma =

Nigerian footballer (born 1995)

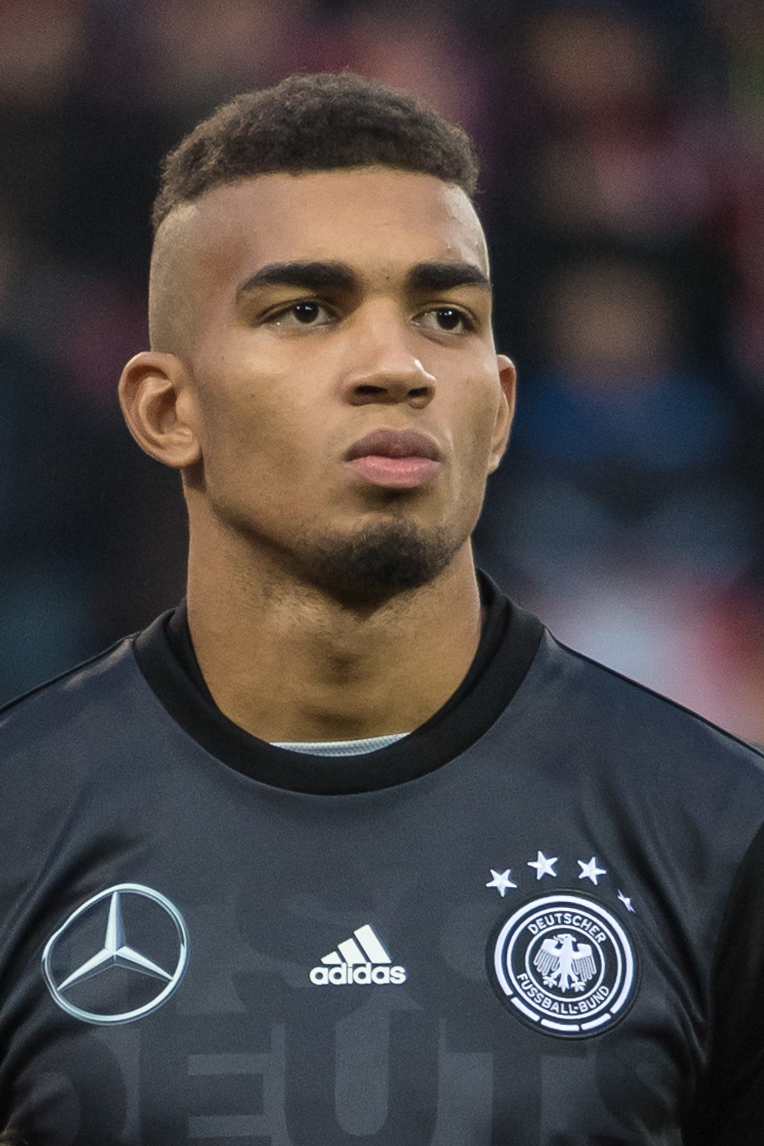
- Akpoguma with Germany U21 in 2016

Personal information
- Full name: Kevin John Ufuoma Akpoguma
- Date of birth: 19 April 1995 (age 31)
- Place of birth: Neustadt an der Weinstraße, Germany
- Height: 1.92 m (6 ft 4 in)
- Positions: Centre back; left-back

Team information
- Current team: Frosinone
- Number: 25

Youth career
- Rot-Weiß Speyer
- Schwarz-Weiß Speyer
- FC Bavaria Wörth
- –2007: FC Neureut 08
- 2007–2012: Karlsruher SC

Senior career*
| Years | Team | Apps | (Gls) |
| 2012–2013 | Karlsruher SC | 8 | (1) |
| 2013–2021 | TSG Hoffenheim II | 62 | (3) |
| 2015–2026 | TSG Hoffenheim | 175 | (3) |
| 2015–2017 | → Fortuna Düsseldorf (loan) | 45 | (0) |
| 2019 | → Hannover 96 (loan) | 4 | (0) |
| 2026– | Frosinone | 0 | (0) |

International career
| 2010–2011 | Germany U16 | 5 | (0) |
| 2011–2012 | Germany U17 | 15 | (0) |
| 2012–2013 | Germany U18 | 5 | (3) |
| 2013–2014 | Germany U19 | 18 | (0) |
| 2014–2016 | Germany U20 | 14 | (1) |
| 2015–2017 | Germany U21 | 7 | (0) |
| 2020–2022 | Nigeria | 8 | (0) |
Medal record
Representing Germany
UEFA European Under-19 Championship
| Winner | 2014 Hungary |
- * Club domestic league appearances and goals as of 18 May 2026

Kevin John Ufuoma Akpoguma (born 19 April 1995) is a professional footballer who plays as a centre-back or left-back for Serie A club Frosinone. Born in Germany, he represented the Nigeria national team. He had also represented Germany at different youth levels.

== Club career ==
Akpoguma spent the 2016–17 season on loan at 2. Bundesliga side Fortuna Düsseldorf. On 21 April 2017, towards the end of the season, he collided with FC St. Pauli's Bernd Nehrig in a league match. Both players were hospitalised with Akpoguma suffering a broken neck.

Akpoguma made his first appearance in the Bundesliga the following season on 22 October 2017, replacing Stefan Posch at half-time in TSG Hoffenheim's 1–1 draw with VfL Wolfsburg. Four days later, he made his first start for the club, in a 1–0 away to Werder Bremen in the second round of the DFB-Pokal.

On 1 August 2026, Akpoguma joined newly Serie A promoted club Frosinone in Italy on a two-season contract.

== International career ==
Born to a German mother and a Nigerian father, Kevin Akpoguma is eligible to play for Germany and Nigeria. He has represented Germany at youth level, playing for the U16, U17, U18, U19, U20, and U21 teams.

He was the captain of the German U-20 National, helping the team reach the quarterfinals of the 2015 FIFA U-20 World Cup in New Zealand.

In October 2018 he stated that he was open to playing to Nigeria.

On 21 September 2020, Nigeria national team coach Gernot Rohr stated that Akpoguma had switched allegiances to play for the Nigeria national team. On 28 September, he confirmed reports that he had decided to play for the Nigeria national team. Akpoguma made his debut with the Nigeria national team in a friendly 1–0 loss against Algeria on 9 October 2020.

== Career statistics ==
=== Club ===
As of match played 16 May 2026

Appearances and goals by club, season and competition
| Club | Season | League | | | Cup | | Europe | | Total | |
| Club | Season | Division | Apps | Goals | Apps | Goals | Apps | Goals | Apps | Goals |
|---|---|---|---|---|---|---|---|---|---|---|
| Karlsruher SC | 2012–13 | 3. Liga | 8 | 0 | 0 | 0 | — | | 8 | 0 |
| TSG Hofenheim II | 2013–14 | Regionalliga Südwest | 26 | 1 | — | | — | | 26 | 1 |
| TSG Hofenheim II | 2014–15 | Regionalliga Südwest | 29 | 2 | — | | — | | 29 | 2 |
| TSG Hofenheim II | 2017–18 | Regionalliga Südwest | 4 | 0 | — | | — | | 4 | 0 |
| TSG Hofenheim II | 2019–20 | Regionalliga Südwest | 1 | 0 | — | | — | | 1 | 0 |
| TSG Hofenheim II | 2020–21 | Regionalliga Südwest | 2 | 0 | — | | — | | 2 | 0 |
| TSG Hofenheim II | Total | | 62 | 3 | — | | — | | 62 | 3 |
| TSG Hoffenheim | 2013–14 | Bundesliga | 0 | 0 | 0 | 0 | — | | 0 | 0 |
| TSG Hoffenheim | 2017–18 | Bundesliga | 22 | 0 | 1 | 0 | — | | 23 | 0 |
| TSG Hoffenheim | 2018–19 | Bundesliga | 8 | 0 | 0 | 0 | 2 (Note: Appearances in UEFA Champions League) | 0 | 10 | 0 |
| TSG Hoffenheim | 2019–20 | Bundesliga | 18 | 0 | 1 | 0 | — | | 19 | 0 |
| TSG Hoffenheim | 2020–21 | Bundesliga | 16 | 1 | 2 | 1 | 4 (Note: Appearances in UEFA Europa League) | 0 | 22 | 2 |
| TSG Hoffenheim | 2021–22 | Bundesliga | 26 | 2 | 3 | 0 | — | | 29 | 2 |
| TSG Hoffenheim | 2022–23 | Bundesliga | 28 | 0 | 2 | 0 | — | | 30 | 0 |
| TSG Hoffenheim | 2023–24 | Bundesliga | 17 | 0 | 1 | 0 | — | | 18 | 0 |
| TSG Hoffenheim | 2024–25 | Bundesliga | 32 | 0 | 3 | 0 | 7 | 0 | 42 | 0 |
| TSG Hoffenheim | 2025–26 | Bundesliga | 8 | 0 | 0 | 0 | — | | 8 | 0 |
| TSG Hoffenheim | Total | | 175 | 3 | 13 | 1 | 13 | 0 | 201 | 4 |
| Fortuna Düsseldorf II (loan) | 2015–16 | Regionalliga West | 5 | 0 | — | | — | | 5 | 0 |
| Fortuna Düsseldorf (loan) | 2015–16 | 2. Bundesliga | 17 | 0 | 1 | 0 | — | | 18 | 0 |
| Fortuna Düsseldorf (loan) | 2016–17 | 2. Bundesliga | 28 | 0 | 2 | 1 | — | | 30 | 1 |
| Fortuna Düsseldorf (loan) | Total | | 45 | 0 | 3 | 1 | — | | 48 | 1 |
| Hannover 96 (loan) | 2018–19 | Bundesliga | 4 | 0 | 1 | 0 | — | | 5 | 0 |
| Career total | | | 299 | 6 | 17 | 2 | 13 | 0 | 329 | 8 |

=== International ===
As of matches played on 18 June 2023

Appearances and goals by national team and year
| National team | Year | Apps | Goals |
|---|---|---|---|
| Nigeria | 2020 | 4 | 0 |
| Nigeria | 2022 | 2 | 0 |
| Nigeria | 2023 | 2 | 0 |
| Total | | 8 | 0 |

== Honours ==
Individual

- Fritz Walter Medal U18 Gold: 2013
