= Sebastian Rudy =

German footballer (born 1990)

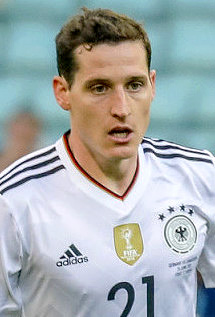
- Rudy playing for Germany at the 2017 FIFA Confederations Cup

Personal information
- Full name: Sebastian Rudy
- Date of birth: 28 February 1990 (age 36)
- Place of birth: Villingen-Schwenningen, West Germany
- Height: 1.80 m (5 ft 11 in)
- Positions: Midfielder; defender

Youth career
- 1996–2001: FC Dietingen
- 2001–2003: SV Zimmern
- 2003–2007: VfB Stuttgart

Senior career*
Years	Team	Apps	(Gls)
2007–2010	VfB Stuttgart II	37	(12)
2008–2010	VfB Stuttgart	15	(0)
2010–2017	TSG Hoffenheim	195	(11)
2017–2018	Bayern Munich	25	(1)
2018–2021	Schalke 04	23	(0)
2019–2021	→ TSG Hoffenheim (loan)	57	(2)
2021–2023	TSG Hoffenheim	43	(3)
Total		395	(29)

International career
2007–2008	Germany U18	7	(1)
2008–2009	Germany U19	8	(2)
2009–2013	Germany U21	23	(5)
2014–2019	Germany	29	(1)
Medal record
Representing Germany
FIFA U-17 World Cup
Bronze medal – third place	2007
FIFA Confederations Cup
Winner	2017
- * Club domestic league appearances and goals

Sebastian Rudy (German pronunciation: [zeˈbasti̯an ˈʁuːdi]; born 28 February 1990) is a German former professional footballer who played as a midfielder or defender. He began his senior career at VfB Stuttgart in 2008 before moving to TSG Hoffenheim in 2010, where he spent a majority of his playing career. Rudy transferred to Bayern Munich in 2017 and won the Bundesliga during a one-year spell with the club. He moved to Schalke 04 in 2018, before returning to Hoffenheim on a loan in 2019 and a permanent transfer in 2021. Rudy retired from professional football in 2023. He currently plays for German amateur team SG Dilsberg.

Rudy was capped twenty-nine times and scored one goal for the Germany national team between 2011 and 2019. He won the FIFA Confederations Cup in 2017 with the national team.

== Club career ==
=== VfB Stuttgart ===
Rudy joined VfB Stuttgart's youth academy in 2003 and started his senior career in 2007 with the club's reserve team, playing in the semi-professional Regionalliga Süd. He made his professional debut with the same team in the newly established 3. Liga on 2 August 2008 against Union Berlin.

During the summer of 2008, he also signed a contract with VfB Stuttgart's first team, for which he made his competitive debut in the first round of the DFB-Pokal on 10 August 2008 in their 5–0 away victory over Hansa Lüneburg.

=== TSG Hoffenheim ===
Rudy moved to TSG Hoffenheim in 2010. On 28 August 2010, Rudy made his debut in a Bundesliga match as a substitute by replacing Peniel Mlapa in the 89th minute in a 1–0 victory over St. Pauli. On 5 February 2011, he scored his first goal for the club in a 3–2 victory over 1. FC Kaiserslautern.

=== Bayern Munich ===
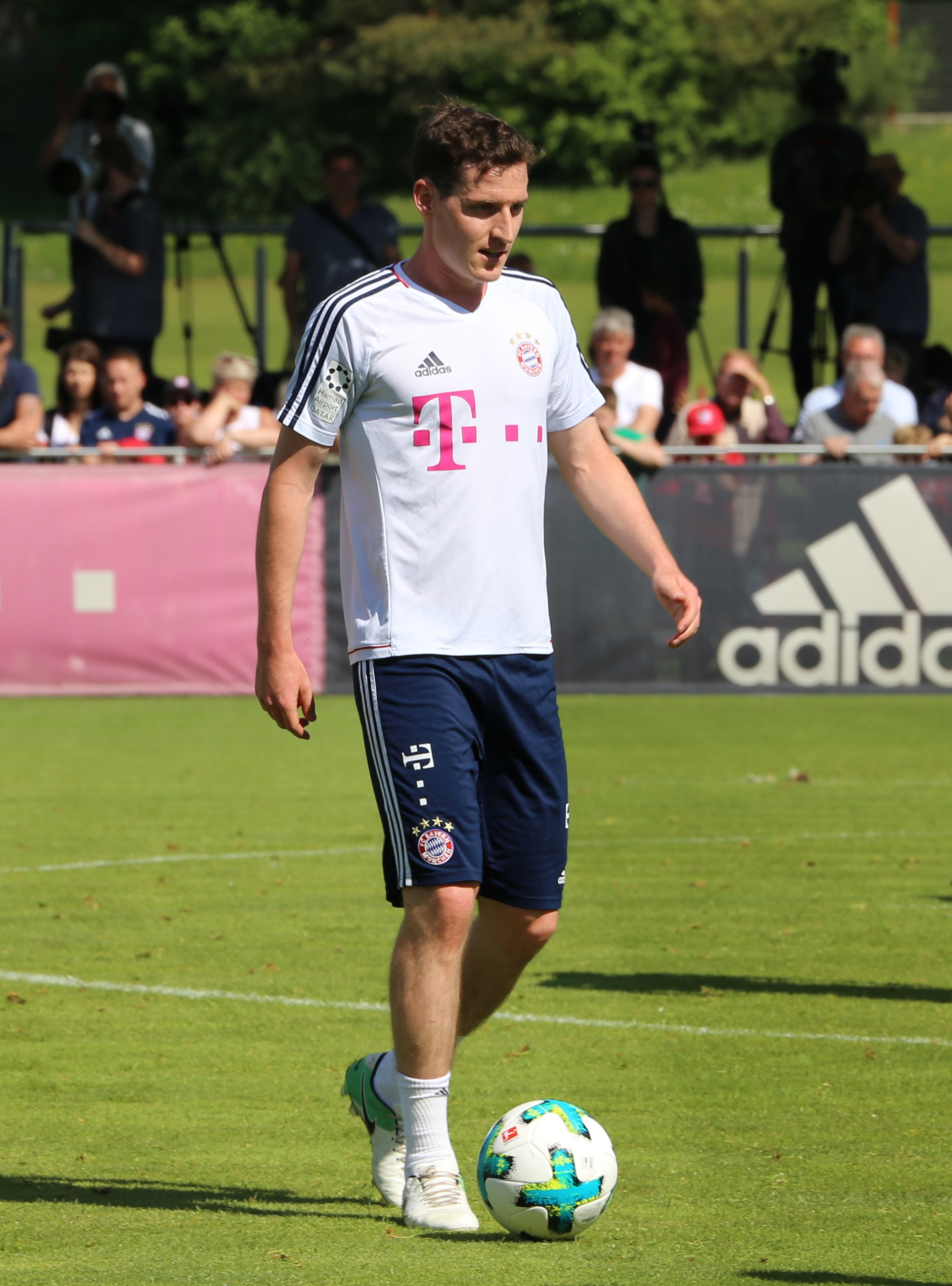
Rudy with Bayern Munich in May 2018

On 15 January 2017, it was announced that Rudy would join Bayern Munich on 1 July 2017 after his Hoffenheim contract expired. On 6 August 2017, Rudy made his debut in a 5–4 penalty-shootout victory over Borussia Dortmund in the 2017 DFL-Supercup. In his first Bundesliga match with the club, he provided an assist from the free-kick to his fellow Bayern newcomer and his former Hoffenheim teammate Niklas Süle in a 3–1 win over Bayer Leverkusen. Rudy scored his first goal for Bayern Munich in a 3–0 victory over Hannover in the Bundesliga.

=== Schalke 04 ===
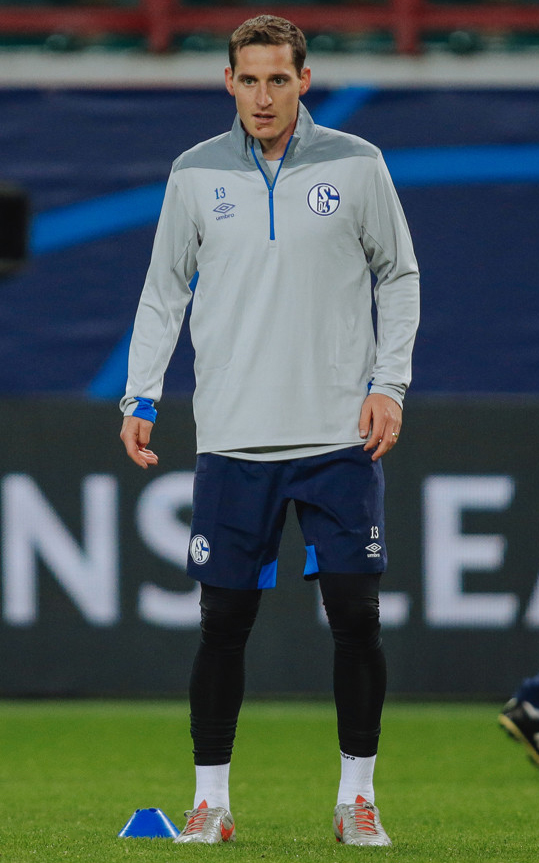
Rudy with Schalke 04 in October 2018

On 27 August 2018, Rudy joined Schalke 04 on a four-year deal, for an undisclosed fee.

=== Return to TSG Hoffenheim ===
On 31 July 2019, Rudy returned to Hoffenheim on a season-long loan deal. On 5 October 2020, he was again loaned to Hoffenheim until the end of the 2020–21 season.

On 16 June 2021, Rudy was released from his contract with Schalke 04. On 28 June, Rudy signed a two-year contract with TSG Hoffenheim.

On 27 September 2023, Rudy announced his retirement from professional football.

== International career ==
Rudy debuted for the German senior team on 13 May 2014 in a friendly against Poland in Hamburg's Imtech Arena. On 6 October 2017, Rudy scored his first international goal from outside the box in a 3–1 victory over Northern Ireland. The goal was scored in the 2nd minute of the match and was Germany's fastest goal ever in World Cup qualifiers.

On 4 June 2018, Rudy was named in Joachim Löw's final 23-man squad for the 2018 FIFA World Cup.

== Career statistics ==
=== Club ===
Appearances and goals by club, season and competition
Club	Season	League			DFB-Pokal		Europe		Other		Total	
Club	Season	Division	Apps	Goals	Apps	Goals	Apps	Goals	Apps	Goals	Apps	Goals
VfB Stuttgart II	2007–08	Regionalliga Süd	15	4	—		—		—		15	4
VfB Stuttgart II	2008–09	3. Liga	16	7	—		—		—		16	7
VfB Stuttgart II	2009–10	3. Liga	6	1	—		—		—		6	1
VfB Stuttgart II	Total		37	12	—		—		—		37	12
VfB Stuttgart	2008–09	Bundesliga	2	0	1	0	2 (Note: Appearances in UEFA Europa League)	0	—		5	0
VfB Stuttgart	2009–10	Bundesliga	13	0	2	0	6 (Note: Appearances in UEFA Champions League)	1	—		21	1
VfB Stuttgart	2010–11	Bundesliga	0	0	1	0	2	1	—		3	1
VfB Stuttgart	Total		15	0	4	0	10	2	—		29	2
TSG Hoffenheim	2010–11	Bundesliga	32	1	3	0	—		—		35	1
TSG Hoffenheim	2011–12	Bundesliga	28	0	1	0	—		—		29	0
TSG Hoffenheim	2012–13	Bundesliga	23	0	1	0	—		2 (Note: Appearances in Bundesliga relegation play-offs)	0	26	0
TSG Hoffenheim	2013–14	Bundesliga	27	2	3	0	—		—		30	2
TSG Hoffenheim	2014–15	Bundesliga	29	4	4	0	—		—		33	4
TSG Hoffenheim	2015–16	Bundesliga	24	2	1	0	—		—		25	2
TSG Hoffenheim	2016–17	Bundesliga	32	2	2	1	—		—		34	3
TSG Hoffenheim	Total		195	11	15	1	—		2	0	212	12
Bayern Munich	2017–18	Bundesliga	25	1	4	0	5	0	1 (Note: Appearance in DFL-Supercup)	0	35	1
Schalke 04	2018–19	Bundesliga	21	0	3	0	4	0	—		28	0
Schalke 04	2020–21	Bundesliga	2	0	0	0	—		—		2	0
Schalke 04	Total		23	0	3	0	4	0	—		30	0
TSG Hoffenheim (loan)	2019–20	Bundesliga	32	1	3	0	—		—		35	1
TSG Hoffenheim (loan)	2020–21	Bundesliga	25	1	1	0	7	0	—		33	1
TSG Hoffenheim	2021–22	Bundesliga	21	3	3	0	—		—		24	3
TSG Hoffenheim	2022–23	Bundesliga	22	0	1	0	—		—		23	0
TSG Hoffenheim	Total		100	5	8	0	7	0	—		115	5
Career total			395	29	34	1	26	2	3	0	458	32

=== International ===
Appearances and goals by national team and year
National team	Year	Apps	Goals
Germany
Germany	2014	5	0
Germany	2015	4	0
Germany	2016	3	0
Germany	2017	12	1
Germany	2018	3	0
Germany	2019	2	0
Total		29	1

Germany score listed first, score column indicates score after each Rudy goal.

List of international goals scored by Sebastian Rudy
No.	Date	Venue	Opponent	Score	Result	Competition
1	5 October 2017	Windsor Park, Belfast, Northern Ireland	Northern Ireland	1–0	3–1	2018 FIFA World Cup qualification

== Honours ==
Bayern Munich

- Bundesliga: 2017–18
- DFL-Supercup: 2017, 2018

Germany U17

- FIFA U-17 World Cup third place: 2007

Germany

- FIFA Confederations Cup: 2017

Individual

- Fritz Walter Medal U18 Silver Medal: 2008
