= Marco John =

German footballer (born 2002)

Personal information
- Date of birth: 2 April 2002 (age 24)
- Place of birth: Bad Friedrichshall, Germany
- Height: 1.84 m (6 ft 0 in)
- Position: Midfielder

Youth career
- SV Sülzbach
- –2013: FC Union Heilbronn
- 2013–2021: TSG Hoffenheim

Senior career*
Years	Team	Apps	(Gls)
2020–2025	TSG Hoffenheim II	20	(0)
2020–2025	TSG Hoffenheim	16	(0)
2022–2023	→ Greuther Fürth (loan)	25	(0)
2025–2026	Greuther Fürth	24	(2)

International career^{‡}
2017	Germany U15	2	(0)
2017–2018	Germany U16	6	(2)
2018–2019	Germany U17	9	(1)
2020	Germany U19	2	(0)
2021	Germany U21	1	(0)
2022–2023	Germany U20	7	(0)
- * Club domestic league appearances and goals as of 18 May 2026 ‡ National team caps and goals as of 22 March 2023

Marco John (born 2 April 2002) is a German professional footballer who plays as a midfielder.

== Career ==
John made his professional debut for TSG Hoffenheim in the UEFA Europa League on 3 December 2020, starting in the home match against Serbian SuperLiga side Red Star Belgrade.

On 26 August 2022, John moved to Greuther Fürth on a season-long loan.

On 4 January 2025, John returned to Greuther Fürth on a permanent basis and signed a 1.5-year contract.
