= Ilay Elmkies =

Israeli footballer (born 2000)

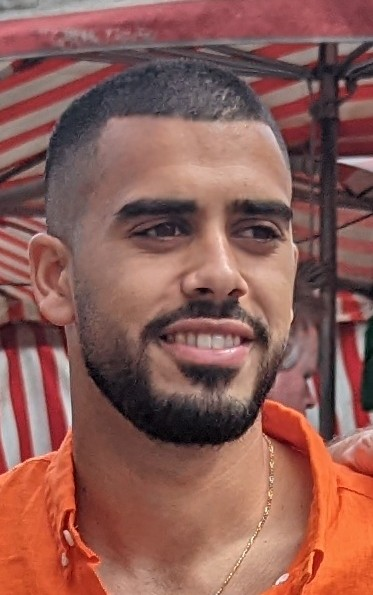
- Elmkies in 2022

Personal information
- Full name: Ilay Eliyahu Elmkies
- Date of birth: 10 March 2000 (age 26)
- Place of birth: Nahariya, Israel
- Height: 1.72 m (5 ft 8 in)
- Position: Midfielder

Team information
- Current team: Maccabi Bnei Reineh
- Number: 8

Youth career
- Beitar Nahariya
- Maccabi Haifa
- –2015: SV Sinsheim
- 2015–2019: 1899 Hoffenheim

Senior career*
Years	Team	Apps	(Gls)
2019–2020	1899 Hoffenheim II	22	(1)
2020–2022	1899 Hoffenheim	1	(0)
2020–2021	→ ADO Den Haag (loan)	9	(0)
2021–2022	→ Admira Wacker (loan)	12	(0)
2022–2023	1899 Hoffenheim II	28	(0)
2023–2025	Bnei Sakhnin	38	(1)
2025	Ironi Tiberias	4	(0)
2025–	Maccabi Bnei Reineh	25	(1)

International career
2015–2016	Israel U16	9	(0)
2016–2017	Israel U17	12	(0)
2018–2019	Israel U19	9	(0)
2019–2022	Israel U21	7	(0)
2019–2020	Israel	5	(1)
- * Club domestic league appearances and goals as of 24 June 2026

Ilay Eliyau Elmkies (or Elmakayes, Hebrew: עילי אליהו אלמקייס; born 10 March 2000) is an Israeli professional footballer who plays as a midfielder for Israeli Premier League club Maccabi Bnei Reineh. He has been capped by the Israel national team.

== Early and personal life ==
Elmkies was born and raised in Nahariya, Israel, to an Israeli family of both Mizrahi Jewish and Sephardi Jewish (French-Jewish) descent.

He also holds a French passport, on account of his Sephardi Jewish (French-Jewish) ancestors, which eases the move to certain European football leagues.

Elmkies speaks Hebrew and English and has quickly mastered German. A film looking at the Jewish experience in the German village of Hoffenheim during World War II aired in 2018 at the Sinsheimer Citydome. He played a leading role, and provided commentary in all three languages.

== Club career ==
A 1899 Hoffenheim youth product in Germany, Elmkies was promoted to the club's senior reserve team 1899 Hoffenheim II in 2019.

== International career ==
He also plays for the Israel national Under-21 team since 2019.

Elmkies received his first call-up to the senior Israel national team in October 2019 ahead of the UEFA Euro 2020 qualifiers matches against Austria and Latvia. He made his senior debut on 15 October 2019 in a home match against Latvia; he was substituted in the 76' minute, as his native Israel won 3–1.

On 7 September 2020, he scored his first goal – an equalizer in the 91' minute for the senior Israeli squad in a 2020–21 UEFA Nations League home match against Slovakia, that ended in a 1–1 draw.

== Career statistics ==
=== International goals ===
Scores and results list Israel's goal tally first, score column indicates score after each Elmkies goal.

List of international goals scored by Ilay Elmkies
No.	Date	Venue	Opponent	Score	Result	Competition
1	7 September 2020	Netanya Stadium, Netanya, Israel	Slovakia	1–1	1–1	2020–21 UEFA Nations League B

== See also ==
- List of Jewish footballers
- List of Jews in sports
- List of Israelis
