= Arthur Chaves =

Brazilian footballer (born 2001)

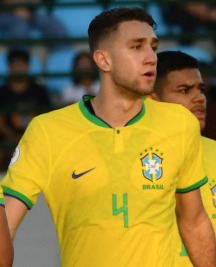
- Chaves playing for Brazil U23 in 2024

Personal information
- Full name: Arthur Largura Chaves
- Date of birth: 29 January 2001 (age 25)
- Place of birth: Florianópolis, Brazil
- Height: 1.87 m (6 ft 2 in)
- Position: Centre-back

Team information
- Current team: Botafogo (on loan from TSG Hoffenheim)
- Number: 3

Youth career
- 2012–2021: Avaí

Senior career*
Years	Team	Apps	(Gls)
2021–2022	Avaí	28	(0)
2022–2024	Académico Viseu	48	(4)
2024–	TSG Hoffenheim	30	(1)
2024	TSG Hoffenheim II	2	(0)
2026	→ FC Augsburg (loan)	10	(2)
2026–	→ Botafogo (loan)	0	(0)

International career^{‡}
2023	Brazil U23	5	(0)
Medal record
Men's football
Representing Brazil
Pan American Games
Winner	2023 Santiago
- * Club domestic league appearances and goals as of 2 May 2026 ‡ National team caps and goals as of 4 November 2023

Arthur Largura Chaves (born 29 January 2001) is a Brazilian professional footballer who plays as a centre-back for Campeonato Brasileiro Série A club Botafogo, on loan from Bundesliga club TSG Hoffenheim.

== Club career ==
Born in Florianópolis, Santa Catarina, Arthur Chaves joined Avaí's youth setup in 2012, aged eleven. He was promoted to the first team in February 2021, and made his senior debut on 4 April, coming on as a second-half substitute in a 1–0 Campeonato Catarinense away win over Metropolitano.

On 1 December 2021, after playing in one league match as his side achieved promotion, Arthur Chaves renewed his contract with Avaí until 2024. He was a regular starter in the 2022 Catarinense, before making his Série A debut on 10 April by starting in a 1–0 home win over América Mineiro.

On 18 August 2022, Arthur Chaves signed a five-year contract with Académico de Viseu in Portugal.

On 31 August 2024, Chaves moved to Bundesliga club TSG Hoffenheim in Germany. On 3 May 2025, he scored his only goal for the club in a 4–4 away draw with Borussia Mönchengladbach.

On 22 January 2026, Chaves was loaned to fellow Bundesliga club FC Augsburg until the end of the season. Two days later, he netted his first goal on his debut in a 2–1 away win over Bayern Munich.

On 4 September 2026, Chaves returned to Brazil and was loaned to Botafogo.

== Career statistics ==
As of match played 2 May 2026

Appearances and goals by club, season and competition
Club	Season	League			State league		National cup (Note: Includes Copa do Brasil, Taça de Portugal, DFB Pokal)		League cup		Continental		Total	
Club	Season	Division	Apps	Goals	Apps	Goals	Apps	Goals	Apps	Goals	Apps	Goals	Apps	Goals
Avaí	2021	Série B	1	0	1	0	0	0	—		—		2	0
Avaí	2022	Série A	17	0	9	0	1	0	—		—		27	0
Avaí	Total		18	0	10	0	1	0	—		—		29	0
Académico de Viseu	2022–23	Liga Portugal 2	26	1	—		3	0	5	0	—		34	1
Académico de Viseu	2023–24	Liga Portugal 2	20	3	—		0	0	0	0	—		20	3
Académico de Viseu	2024–25	Liga Portugal 2	2	0	—		0	0	0	0	—		2	0
Académico de Viseu	Total		48	4	—		3	0	5	0	—		56	4
TSG Hoffenheim	2024–25	Bundesliga	26	1	—		2	0	—		6 (Note: Appearances in UEFA Europa League)	0	34	1
TSG Hoffenheim	2025–26	Bundesliga	4	0	—		1	0	—		—		5	0
TSG Hoffenheim	2026–27	Bundesliga	0	0	—		0	0	0	0	—		0	0
TSG Hoffenheim	Total		30	1	—		3	0	—		6	0	39	1
TSG Hoffenheim II	2024–25	Regionalliga Südwest	2	0	—		—		—		—		2	0
FC Augsburg (loan)	2025–26	Bundesliga	10	2	—		0	0	—		—		10	2
Career total			108	7	10	0	7	0	5	0	6	0	130	7

== Honours ==
Avaí

- Campeonato Catarinense: 2021

Brazil U23

- Pan American Games: 2023

Individual

- Liga Portugal 2 Defender of the Month: February 2023
