= Umut Tohumcu =

German footballer

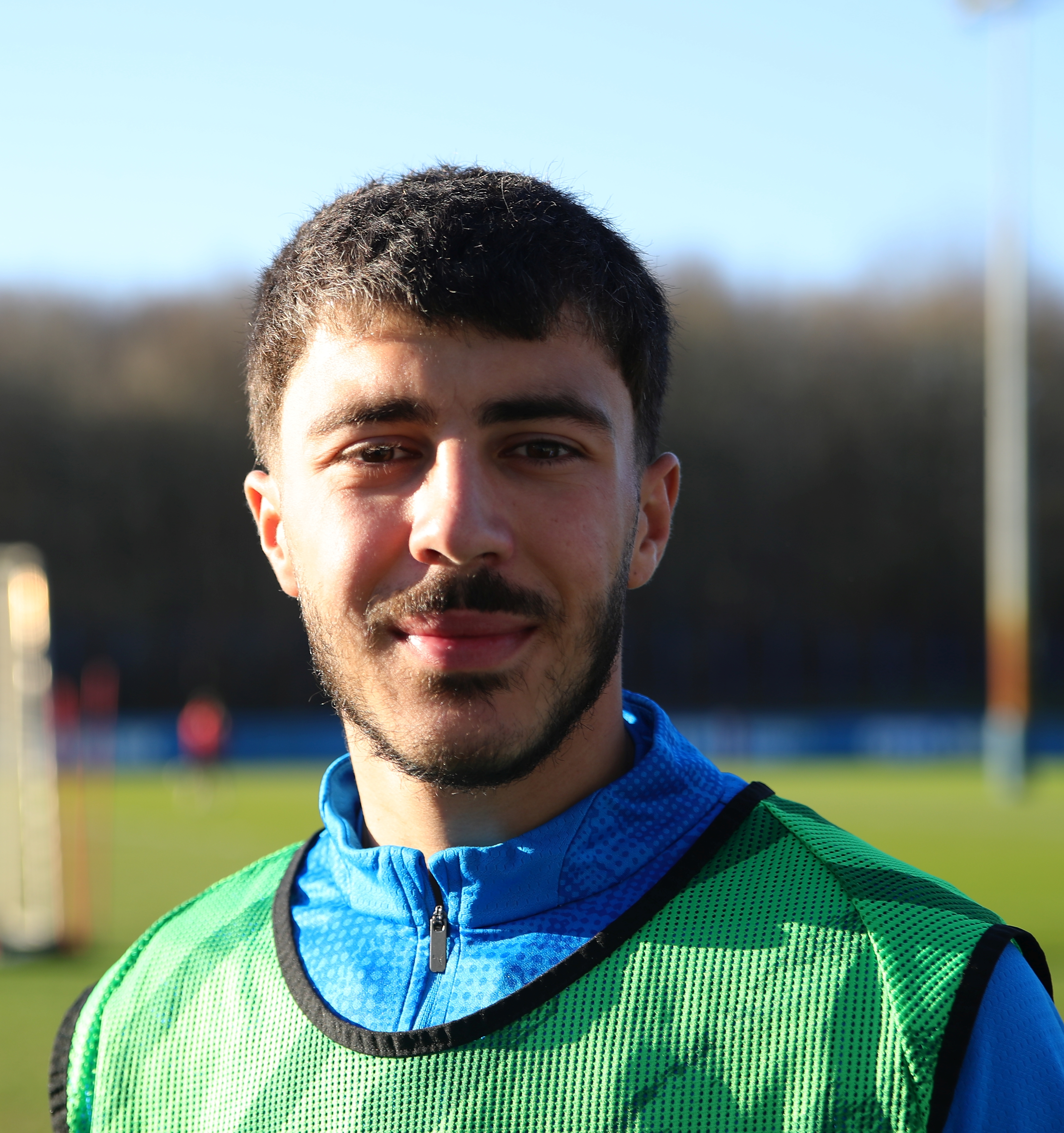
- Tohumcu in 2026

Personal information
- Full name: Umut Deger Tohumcu
- Date of birth: 11 August 2004 (age 22)
- Place of birth: Offenburg, Germany
- Height: 1.75 m (5 ft 9 in)
- Position: Midfielder

Team information
- Current team: Red Bull Salzburg (on loan from TSG Hoffenheim)
- Number: 7

Youth career
- 2011–2012: SC Offenburg
- 2012–2016: Offenburger FV
- 2016–2017: SC Freiburg
- 2017–2022: TSG Hoffenheim

Senior career*
Years	Team	Apps	(Gls)
2022–	TSG Hoffenheim	46	(0)
2022–2026	TSG Hoffenheim II	36	(8)
2026	→ Holstein Kiel (loan)	13	(1)
2026–	→ Red Bull Salzburg (loan)	5	(0)

International career^{‡}
2019	Germany U15	2	(0)
2019–2020	Germany U16	5	(2)
2020	Germany U17	1	(0)
2021–2023	Germany U18	8	(1)
2023	Germany U20	4	(0)
2024–	Germany U21	4	(0)
- * Club domestic league appearances and goals as of 25 October 2026 ‡ National team caps and goals as of 10:45, 10 September 2025 (UTC)

Umut Deger Tohumcu (born 11 August 2004) is a German-Turkish professional footballer who plays as a midfielder for Austrian Bundesliga club Red Bull Salzburg, on loan from Bundesliga club TSG Hoffenheim.

== Career ==
Tohumcu is a youth product of the academies of Offenburger FV, SC Freiburg and TSG Hoffenheim. At 14, he received some attention when he was a ballboy at Hoffenheim, as he quickly threw the ball to Andrej Kramarić who then scored a against Bayern Munich in a win on 9 September 2017. He made his professional debut with Hoffenheim in a 5–1 Bundesliga loss to Borussia Mönchengladbach on 14 May 2022, coming on as a late substite in the 86th minute.

On 2 January 2026, Tohumcu was loaned by 2. Bundesliga club Holstein Kiel.

On 14 August 2026, Tohumcu was loaned to Red Bull Salzburg.

== International career ==
Born in Germany, Tohumcu is of Turkish descent. Tohumcu is a youth international for Germany, having represented the Germany U15s, 16s, U17s, and U18s.

== Career statistics ==
As of match played 28 October 2026

Appearances and goals by club, season and competition
Club	Season	League			National cup (Note: Includes DFB-Pokal)		Continental		Other		Total	
Club	Season	Division	Apps	Goals	Apps	Goals	Apps	Goals	Apps	Goals	Apps	Goals
1899 Hoffenheim	2021–22	Bundesliga	1	0	0	0	—		—		1	0
1899 Hoffenheim	2022–23	Bundesliga	8	0	—		—		—		8	0
1899 Hoffenheim	2023–24	Bundesliga	20	0	1	0	—		—		21	0
1899 Hoffenheim	2024–25	Bundesliga	12	0	1	0	5 (Note: Appearances in UEFA Europa League)	1	—		18	1
1899 Hoffenheim	2025–26	Bundesliga	5	0	2	0	—		—		7	0
1899 Hoffenheim	Total		46	0	4	0	5	1	—		55	1
1899 Hoffenheim II	2022–23	Regionalliga Südwest	23	5	—		—		—		23	5
1899 Hoffenheim II	2023–24	Regionalliga Südwest	8	1	—		—		—		8	1
1899 Hoffenheim II	2024–25	Regionalliga Südwest	4	1	—		—		—		4	1
1899 Hoffenheim II	2025–26	3. Liga	1	1	—		—		—		1	1
1899 Hoffenheim II	Total		36	8	—		—		—		36	8
Holstein Kiel (loan)	2025–26	2. Bundesliga	13	1	1	0	—		—		14	1
Red Bull Salzburg (loan)	2026–27	Austrian Bundesliga	5	0	2	0	3	0	—		10	0
Career total			100	9	7	0	8	1	0	0	115	10
