= 2024–25 TSG 1899 Hoffenheim season =

TSG 1899 Hoffenheim
2024–25 season
- Owner: Dietmar Hopp
- President: Jörg Albrecht
- Head coach: Pellegrino Matarazzo (until 11 November); Christian Ilzer (from 15 November)
- Stadium: Rhein-Neckar-Arena
- Bundesliga: 15th
- DFB-Pokal: Round of 16
- UEFA Europa League: League phase
- Top goalscorer: League: Andrej Kramarić (11); All: Adam Hložek; Andrej Kramarić (11 each)
- Average home league attendance: 25,309
Home colours	Away colours	Third colours

The 2024–25 season was the 126th season in the history of TSG 1899 Hoffenheim, and the club's 17th consecutive season in the Bundesliga. In addition to the domestic league, the club participated in the DFB-Pokal and the UEFA Europa League.

== Players ==
=== First-team squad ===
As of 3 February 2025

Note: Flags indicate national team as defined under FIFA eligibility rules; some limited exceptions apply. Players may hold more than one non-FIFA nationality.

No.	Pos.	Nation	Player
1	GK	GER	Oliver Baumann (captain)
2	DF	CZE	Robin Hranáč
3	DF	CZE	Pavel Kadeřábek
4	DF	NOR	Leo Skiri Østigård (on loan from Rennes)
5	DF	TUR	Ozan Kabak
6	MF	GER	Grischa Prömel
7	MF	GER	Tom Bischof
8	MF	GER	Dennis Geiger
9	FW	TOG	Ihlas Bebou
13	DF	GER	Christopher Lenz
14	FW	NGR	Gift Orban
15	DF	FRA	Valentin Gendrey
16	MF	GER	Anton Stach
17	MF	GER	Umut Tohumcu
18	MF	MLI	Diadie Samassékou
19	DF	CZE	David Jurásek (on loan from Benfica)

No.	Pos.	Nation	Player
20	MF	GER	Finn Ole Becker
21	FW	GER	Marius Bülter
22	MF	AUT	Alexander Prass
23	FW	CZE	Adam Hložek
25	DF	NGR	Kevin Akpoguma
26	FW	BIH	Haris Tabaković
27	FW	CRO	Andrej Kramarić
29	FW	CIV	Bazoumana Touré
32	GK	DEN	Jakob Busk (on loan from Sønderjyske)
33	FW	GER	Max Moerstedt
34	DF	FRA	Stanley Nsoki
35	DF	BRA	Arthur Chaves
36	GK	ISL	Lúkas Petersson
37	GK	GER	Luca Philipp
52	FW	FRA	David Mokwa
53	FW	TUR	Erencan Yardımcı

=== Players out on loan ===
Note: Flags indicate national team as defined under FIFA eligibility rules; some limited exceptions apply. Players may hold more than one non-FIFA nationality.

No.	Pos.	Nation	Player
—	GK	GER	Nahuel Noll (at Greuther Fürth until 30 June 2025)
—	DF	GER	Tim Drexler (at 1. FC Nürnberg until 30 June 2025)
—	DF	GER	Joshua Quarshie (at Greuther Fürth until 30 June 2025)
—	DF	HUN	Attila Szalai (at Standard Liège until 30 June 2025)
—	MF	GER	Muhammed Damar (at SV Elversberg until 30 June 2025)

No.	Pos.	Nation	Player
—	MF	AUT	Florian Grillitsch (at Valladolid until 30 June 2025)
—	FW	KOS	Fisnik Asllani (at SV Elversberg until 30 June 2025)
—	FW	GER	Mërgim Berisha (at FC Augsburg until 30 June 2025)
—	FW	GER	Bambasé Conté (at Karlsruher SC until 30 June 2025)

== Transfers ==
=== In ===
Pos.	Player	Transferred from	Fee	Date	Source
DF	(Hungary) Attila Szalai	(Germany) SC Freiburg	Loan return	30 June 2024	
MF	(Denmark) Jacob Bruun Larsen	(England) Burnley	Loan return	30 June 2024	
MF	(Mali) Diadie Samassékou	(Spain) Cádiz	Loan return	30 June 2024	
MF	(Austria) Alexander Prass	(Austria) Sturm Graz	€9,500,000	5 August 2024	
FW	(Czech Republic) Adam Hložek	(Germany) Bayer Leverkusen	€18,000,000	17 August 2024	
FW	(Bosnia and Herzegovina) Haris Tabaković	(Germany) Hertha BSC	€3,000,000	23 August 2024	
DF	(Czech Republic) Robin Hranáč	(Czech Republic) Viktoria Plzeň	€8,000,000	25 August 2024	
DF	(France) Valentin Gendrey	(Italy) Lecce	€8,000,000	27 August 2024	
DF	(Brazil) Arthur Chaves	(Portugal) Académico de Viseu	€6,000,000	31 August 2024	
FW	(Nigeria) Gift Orban	(France) Lyon	€9,000,000	2 January 2025	
GK	(Denmark) Jakob Busk	(Denmark) Sønderjyske	Loan	1 February 2025	
FW	(Ivory Coast) Bazoumana Touré	(Sweden) Hammarby IF	€10,000,000	1 February 2025	
DF	(Norway) Leo Skiri Østigård	(France) Rennes	Loan	3 February 2025	

=== Out ===
Pos.	Player	Transferred to	Fee	Date	Source
DF	(Czech Republic) David Jurásek	(Portugal) Benfica	End of loan	30 June 2024	
FW	(Netherlands) Wout Weghorst	(England) Burnley	End of loan	30 June 2024	
DF	(United States) John Brooks	(Germany) Hertha BSC	End of contract	1 July 2024	
MF	(Ghana) Kasim Nuhu	(Switzerland) Servette	End of contract	1 July 2024	
GK	(Germany) Nahuel Noll	(Germany) Greuther Fürth	Loan	1 July 2024	
MF	(Denmark) Robert Skov	(Germany) Union Berlin	End of contract	1 July 2024	
MF	(Germany) Bambasé Conté	(Germany) Karlsruher SC	Loan	3 July 2024	
FW	(Kosovo) Fisnik Asllani	(Germany) SV Elversberg	Loan	23 July 2024	
FW	(Germany) Maximilian Beier	(Germany) Borussia Dortmund	€28,500,000	12 August 2024	.
MF	(Germany) Muhammed Damar	(Germany) SV Elversberg	Loan	20 August 2024	
MF	(Germany) Julian Justvan	(Germany) 1. FC Nürnberg	€1,000,000	20 August 2024	
FW	(Denmark) Jacob Bruun Larsen	(Germany) VfB Stuttgart	€1,700,000	8 January 2025	
DF	(Hungary) Attila Szalai	(Belgium) Standard Liège	Loan	12 January 2025	
FW	(Germany) Mërgim Berisha	(Germany) FC Augsburg	Loan	28 January 2025	
MF	(Austria) Florian Grillitsch	(Spain) Valladolid	Loan	3 February 2025	

== Friendlies ==
=== Pre-season ===
13 July 2024 Friendly	FC Astoria Walldorf	1–7	TSG Hoffenheim	Walldorf
17:00 CEST (UTC+2)	Bicki 83' (pen.)	Report	Damar 4'; Bischof (penalty missed) 19'; Moerstedt 21'; Justvan 58'; Micheler 63'; Bülter 68' (pen.); Asllani 71', 80'	Stadium: Stadion Astoria Walldorf; Attendance: 1,650; Referee: Mika Forster

24 July 2024 Friendly	TSG Hoffenheim	3–1	SV Elversberg	Zuzenhausen
12:00 CEST (UTC+2)	Noah Kristof 16' (o.g.); Simon Kalambayi 69'; Moerstedt 74'		Le Joncour 72'	Stadium: Sportanlage Häuselgrund

30 July 2024 Friendly	TSG Hoffenheim	2–2	Norwich City	St. Johann in Tirol, Austria
18:00 CEST (UTC+2)	Bebou 20'; Bülter 25'		Rowe 52'; Hills 66'	Stadium: Koasastadion

3 August 2024 Friendly	TSG Hoffenheim	0–1	Ipswich Town	Kufstein, Austria
13:30 CEST (UTC+2)			Jack Taylor 43'	Stadium: Kufstein Arena

10 August 2024 Friendly	TSG Hoffenheim	0–2	Fulham	Sinsheim
17:00 CEST (UTC+2)			Smith Rowe 33'; Traoré 64'	Stadium: Rhein-Neckar-Arena

== Competitions ==
=== Overall record ===
Competition	First match	Last match	Starting round	Final position	Record							
Competition	First match	Last match	Starting round	Final position	Pld	W	D	L	GF	GA	GD	Win %
Bundesliga	24 August 2024	17 May 2025	Matchday 1	15th	34	7	11	16	46	68	−22	20.59
DFB-Pokal	16 August 2024	4 December 2024	First round	Round of 16	3	1	1	1	4	6	−2	33.33
UEFA Europa League	25 September 2024	30 January 2025	League phase	League phase	8	2	3	3	11	14	−3	25.00
Total					45	10	15	20	61	88	−27	22.22

Source: Soccerway

=== Bundesliga ===
==== League table ====
Pos	Team	Pld	W	D	L	GF	GA	GD	Pts	Qualification or relegation
13	Union Berlin	34	10	10	14	35	51	−16	40	
14	FC St. Pauli	34	8	8	18	28	41	−13	32	
15	TSG Hoffenheim	34	7	11	16	46	68	−22	32	
16	1. FC Heidenheim (O)	34	8	5	21	37	64	−27	29	Qualification for the relegation play-offs
17	Holstein Kiel (R)	34	6	7	21	49	80	−31	25	Relegation to 2. Bundesliga

Source: Bundesliga
Rules for classification: 1) Points; 2) Goal difference; 3) Goals scored; 4) Head-to-head results; 5) Head-to-head away goals scored; 6) Away goals scored; 7) Play-off.
(Rules 4–6 only apply after home and away matches have been played between the tied teams.)
(O) Play-off winners; (R) Relegated

==== Results summary ====
Overall								Home						Away					
Pld	W	D	L	GF	GA	GD	Pts	W	D	L	GF	GA	GD	W	D	L	GF	GA	GD
34	7	11	16	46	68	−22	32	4	5	8	25	36	−11	3	6	8	21	32	−11

Source: DFB

==== Results by round ====
Round	1	2	3	4	5	6	7	8	9	10	11	12	13	14	15	16	17	18	19	20	21	22	23	24	25	26	27	28	29	30	31	32	33	34
Ground	H	A	H	A	H	A	H	A	H	A	H	A	H	A	H	H	A	A	H	A	H	A	H	A	H	A	H	A	H	A	H	A	A	H
Result	W	L	L	L	L	D	W	D	L	D	W	L	D	D	L	L	L	W	D	W	L	W	D	W	D	L	D	L	W	L	L	D	D	L
Position	6	11	14	15	16	16	14	15	16	15	13	14	14	14	15	15	16	15	15	15	15	15	14	13	13	14	14	14	14	15	15	15	15	15

Source: DFB
A = Away; H = Home; W = Win; D = Draw; L = Loss

==== Matches ====
The league schedule was released on 4 July 2024.

24 August 2024 1	TSG Hoffenheim	3–2	Holstein Kiel	Sinsheim
15:30 CEST (UTC+2)	Kramarić 6' (pen.), 37', 87'; Hložek (yellow card) 14'; Moerstedt (yellow card) 90+3'	Report	Weiner (yellow card) 5'; Bernhardsson 63'; Kelati (yellow card) 81' (yellow-red card) 82'; Machino 89'	Stadium: Rhein-Neckar-Arena; Attendance: 18,503; Referee: Tobias Stieler

31 August 2024 2	Eintracht Frankfurt	3–1	TSG Hoffenheim	Frankfurt
15:30 CEST (UTC+2)	Ekitike 24'; Larsson 33'; Marmoush 56'	Report	Drexler (yellow card) 11'; Kramarić 54'; Micheler (yellow card) 64'; Akpoguma (yellow card) 72'	Stadium: Deutsche Bank Park; Attendance: 57,100; Referee: Florian Badstübner

14 September 2024 3	TSG Hoffenheim	1–4	Bayer Leverkusen	Sinsheim
15:30 CEST (UTC+2)	Prass (yellow card) 35'; Berisha 37'; Geiger (yellow card) 68'; Akpoguma (yellow card) 90+1'	Report	Terrier 17', (yellow card) 39'; Boniface 30', 75'; Andrich (yellow card) 51'; Wirtz 72' (pen.)	Stadium: Rhein-Neckar-Arena; Attendance: 30,150; Referee: Daniel Schlager

21 September 2024 4	Union Berlin	2–1	TSG Hoffenheim	Berlin
15:30 CEST (UTC+2)	Rothe 4', (yellow card) 71'; Jeong 6'; Pefok (yellow card) 23'; Vertessen (yellow card) 85'	Report	Kadeřábek (yellow card) 50'; Bülter 67'; Bischof (yellow card) 79'; Tohumcu (yellow card) 89'	Stadium: Stadion An der Alten Försterei; Attendance: 21,831; Referee: Matthias Jöllenbeck

29 September 2024 5	TSG Hoffenheim	3–4	Werder Bremen	Sinsheim
17:30 CEST (UTC+2)	Bülter 5', 8'; Tohumcu (yellow card) 10'; Hložek 12'; Nsoki (red card) 18'; Stach (yellow card) 78'; Drexler (yellow card) 90+3'	Report	Malatini 21'; Köhn (yellow card) 22'; Stage 26', 39', 49', (yellow card) 73'; Topp (yellow card) 90+4'	Stadium: Rhein-Neckar-Arena; Attendance: 26,018; Referee: Tobias Reichel

6 October 2024 6	VfB Stuttgart	1–1	TSG Hoffenheim	Stuttgart
19:30 CEST (UTC+2)	Mittelstädt (yellow card) 26'; Demirović (penalty missed) 90+9', 90+9'	Report	Gendrey 45'; Bischof (yellow card) 45+3'; Grillitsch (yellow card) 55'; Kramarić (yellow card) 66'; Chaves (yellow card) 71'	Stadium: MHPArena; Attendance: 58,000; Referee: Harm Osmers

19 October 2024 7	TSG Hoffenheim	3–1	VfL Bochum	Sinsheim
15:30 CEST (UTC+2)	Kramarić 11'; Bülter 64', (yellow card) 82'; Tabaković 90+3'	Report	Mašović (yellow card) 55'; Gamboa 76'; Daschner (penalty missed) 89'	Stadium: Rhein-Neckar-Arena; Attendance: 19,281; Referee: Sören Storks

27 October 2024 8	1. FC Heidenheim	0–0	TSG Hoffenheim	Heidenheim
19:30 CET (UTC+1)	Pieringer (yellow card) 32'	Report	Stach (yellow card) 33'; Berisha (yellow card) 90'	Stadium: Voith-Arena; Attendance: 15,000; Referee: Christian Dingert

2 November 2024 9	TSG Hoffenheim	0–2	FC St. Pauli	Sinsheim
15:30 CET (UTC+1)		Report	Afolayan 20'; Guilavogui (yellow card) 64'; Albers 90+3'	Stadium: Rhein-Neckar-Arena; Attendance: 26,199; Referee: Sascha Stegemann

10 November 2024 10	FC Augsburg	0–0	TSG Hoffenheim	Augsburg
15:30 CET (UTC+1)	Giannoulis (yellow card) 71'; Claude-Maurice (yellow card) 75'	Report	Kadeřábek (yellow card) 1'; Bülter (yellow card) 35'; Akpoguma (yellow card) 87'	Stadium: WWK Arena; Attendance: 28,300; Referee: Martin Petersen

23 November 2024 11	TSG Hoffenheim	4–3	RB Leipzig	Sinsheim
15:30 CET (UTC+1)	Hložek 17', 82'; Bischof 50'; Kramarić (yellow card) 75'; Bruun Larsen 87'; Kadeřábek (yellow card) 90'	Report	Orbán 15'; Nusa 19'; Nsoki 67' (o.g.); Lukeba (yellow card) 85'	Stadium: Rhein-Neckar-Arena; Attendance: 28,023; Referee: Frank Willenborg

1 December 2024 12	Mainz 05	2–0	TSG Hoffenheim	Mainz
15:30 CET (UTC+1)	Burkardt 4', 24'; Mwene (yellow card) 16'	Report	Kramarić (yellow card) 28'; Kadeřábek (yellow card) 32'; Stach (yellow card) 47'	Stadium: Mewa Arena; Attendance: 30,400; Referee: Daniel Siebert

8 December 2024 13	TSG Hoffenheim	1–1	SC Freiburg	Sinsheim
17:30 CET (UTC+1)	Bischof 73'; Geiger (yellow card) 81'	Report	Osterhage (yellow card) 26'; Ginter 68'	Stadium: Rhein-Neckar-Arena; Attendance: 22,027; Referee: Sven Jablonski

15 December 2024 14	Borussia Dortmund	1–1	TSG Hoffenheim	Dortmund
17:30 CET (UTC+1)	Groß (yellow card) 26'; Nmecha (yellow card) 44'; Reyna 46', (yellow card) 73'; Gittens (yellow card) 76'; Adeyemi (yellow card) 90+5'	Report	Gendrey (yellow card) 21'; Bruun Larsen 90+1'; Geiger (yellow card) 90+4'	Stadium: Signal Iduna Park; Attendance: 81,365; Referee: Harm Osmers

21 December 2024 15	TSG Hoffenheim	1–2	Borussia Mönchengladbach	Sinsheim
15:30 CET (UTC+1)	Kramarić 58' (pen.)	Report	Sander 23'; Pléa 61'	Stadium: Rhein-Neckar-Arena; Attendance: 28,923; Referee: Bastian Dankert

11 January 2025 16	TSG Hoffenheim	0–1	VfL Wolfsburg	Sinsheim
15:30 CET (UTC+1)	Moerstedt (yellow card) 68'	Report	Tomás (yellow card) 8'; Amoura 29'; Vavro (yellow card) 83'	Stadium: Rhein-Neckar-Arena; Attendance: 18,114; Referee: Christian Dingert

15 January 2025 17	Bayern Munich	5–0	TSG Hoffenheim	Munich
20:30 CET (UTC+1)	Sané 7', 48'; Guerreiro 12'; Kane 26' (pen.); Müller (yellow card) 61'; Gnabry 66'	Report	Kadeřábek (yellow card) 87'	Stadium: Allianz Arena; Attendance: 75,000; Referee: Timo Gerach

18 January 2025 18	Holstein Kiel	1–3	TSG Hoffenheim	Kiel
15:30 CET (UTC+1)	Knudsen (yellow card) 53'; Kelati 84'; Weiner (yellow card) 87'	Report	Chaves (yellow card) 23'; Hložek 26', 56'; Kramarić 45+1'	Stadium: Holstein-Stadion; Attendance: 13,923; Referee: Felix Brych

26 January 2025 19	TSG Hoffenheim	2–2	Eintracht Frankfurt	Sinsheim
15:30 CET (UTC+1)	Chaves (yellow card) 58'; Orban 65'; Stach (yellow card) 83'; Hložek 90+5', (yellow card) 90+6'	Report	Ekitike 26' (pen.), 71'	Stadium: Rhein-Neckar-Arena; Attendance: 30,150; Referee: Sascha Stegemann

2 February 2025 20	Bayer Leverkusen	3–1	TSG Hoffenheim	Leverkusen
17:30 CET (UTC+1)	Boniface 15'; Frimpong 19'; Grimaldo (yellow card) 45+2' (yellow-red card) 61'; Schick 51'; Tah (yellow card) 79'; García (yellow card) 90+5'	Report	Geiger (yellow card) 34'; Orban 62'; Yardımcı (yellow card) 79'; Bischof (yellow card) 79'	Stadium: BayArena; Attendance: 29,278; Referee: Robin Braun

8 February 2025 21	TSG Hoffenheim	0–4	Union Berlin	Sinsheim
15:30 CET (UTC+1)	Bülter (yellow card) 2'; Geiger (yellow card) 36'	Report	Hollerbach 24', 87'; Ljubičić 61'; Ilić 73'; Trimmel (yellow card) 90'	Stadium: Rhein-Neckar-Arena; Attendance: 20,023; Referee: Tobias Stieler

16 February 2025 22	Werder Bremen	1–3	TSG Hoffenheim	Bremen
15:30 CET (UTC+1)	Nsoki 7' (o.g.); Schmid (yellow card) 38'; Burke (yellow card) 90+2'	Report	Stach 28'; Bischof 44'; Orban (yellow card) 50', (goal) 63'; Chaves (yellow card) 56'; Yardımcı (yellow card) 85'	Stadium: Weserstadion; Attendance: 40,000; Referee: Frank Willenborg

23 February 2025 23	TSG Hoffenheim	1–1	VfB Stuttgart	Sinsheim
19:30 CET (UTC+1)	Orban 74'	Report	Woltemade 9'	Stadium: Rhein-Neckar-Arena; Attendance: 30,150; Referee: Christian Dingert

1 March 2025 24	VfL Bochum	0–1	TSG Hoffenheim	Bochum
15:30 CET (UTC+1)		Report	Stach (yellow card) 53'; Bischof 72'	Stadium: Vonovia Ruhrstadion; Attendance: 24,120; Referee: Florian Badstübner

9 March 2025 25	TSG Hoffenheim	1–1	1. FC Heidenheim	Sinsheim
17:30 CET (UTC+1)	Tabaković 34'; Chaves (yellow card) 90+3'; Becker (yellow card) 90+7'	Report	Siersleben (yellow card) 9'; Pieringer (yellow card) 13'; Zivzivadze 65'; Traoré (yellow card) 90+5'	Stadium: Rhein-Neckar-Arena; Attendance: 20,814; Referee: Daniel Schlager

14 March 2025 26	FC St. Pauli	1–0	TSG Hoffenheim	Hamburg
20:30 CET (UTC+1)	Weißhaupt 51'	Report	Stach (yellow card) 55'	Stadium: Millerntor-Stadion; Attendance: 29,546; Referee: Felix Brych

29 March 2025 27	TSG Hoffenheim	1–1	FC Augsburg	Sinsheim
15:30 CET (UTC+1)	Kramarić 71' (pen.); Bülter (yellow card) 76'	Report	Zesiger (yellow card) 34'; Essende 46'; Onyeka (yellow card) 57'; Claude-Maurice (yellow card) 61'	Stadium: Rhein-Neckar-Arena; Attendance: 21,427; Referee: Tobias Reichel

5 April 2025 28	RB Leipzig	3–1	TSG Hoffenheim	Leipzig
15:30 CEST (UTC+2)	Šeško 24'; Baku 43'; Poulsen 84'	Report	Touré (yellow card) 4'; Bischof 11'; Østigård (red card) 28'; Chaves (yellow card) 72'; Orban (yellow card) 90'	Stadium: Red Bull Arena; Attendance: 44,478; Referee: Robert Hartmann

12 April 2025 29	TSG Hoffenheim	2–0	Mainz 05	Sinsheim
15:30 CEST (UTC+2)	Kramarić 4', 32'; Chaves (yellow card) 23'; Nsoki (yellow card) 45+2'; Bischof (yellow card) 75'; Baumann (yellow card) 90+3'	Report	Nebel (yellow card) 49' (yellow-red card) 90+4'	Stadium: Rhein-Neckar-Arena; Attendance: 30,150; Referee: Sven Jablonski

19 April 2025 30	SC Freiburg	3–2	TSG Hoffenheim	Freiburg
15:30 CEST (UTC+2)	Höler 28', 57', (yellow card) 73'; Dōan 36', (yellow card) 74'; Osterhage (yellow card) 59'	Report	Nsoki (yellow card) 39'; Bülter 45+2'; Kramarić 45+5'; Bischof (yellow card) 76'	Stadium: Europa-Park Stadion; Attendance: 34,100; Referee: Sascha Stegemann

26 April 2025 31	TSG Hoffenheim	2–3	Borussia Dortmund	Sinsheim
15:30 CEST (UTC+2)	Hložek 61'; Chaves (yellow card) 64'; Kadeřábek 90+1', (yellow card) 90+8'; Nsoki (yellow card) 90+7'; Stach (yellow card) 90+12'; Tohumcu (yellow card) 90+13'	Report	Guirassy 20', (penalty missed) 34'; Anton (yellow card) 42', (goal) 90+5'; Brandt 74'	Stadium: Rhein-Neckar-Arena; Attendance: 30,150; Referee: Benjamin Brand

3 May 2025 32	Borussia Mönchengladbach	4–4	TSG Hoffenheim	Mönchengladbach
15:30 CEST (UTC+2)	Chiarodia 5'; Reitz 32'; Honorat 64'; Kleindienst 90+1'	Report	Chaves 43'; Bülter 54'; Hložek 73'; Tabaković 81'	Stadium: Borussia-Park; Attendance: 52,000; Referee: Frank Willenborg

9 May 2025 33	VfL Wolfsburg	2–2	TSG Hoffenheim	Wolfsburg
20:30 CEST (UTC+2)	Østigård 1' (o.g.); Wind 81'	Report	Kadeřábek 34'; Stach (yellow card) 43'; Kramarić (yellow card) 80'; Bülter 84'	Stadium: Volkswagen Arena; Attendance: 20,145; Referee: Matthias Jöllenbeck

17 May 2025 34	TSG Hoffenheim	0–4	Bayern Munich	Sinsheim
15:30 CEST (UTC+2)		Report	Olise 33'; Kimmich 53'; Gnabry 80'; Kane 86'	Stadium: Rhein-Neckar-Arena; Attendance: 30,150; Referee: Daniel Schlager

=== DFB-Pokal ===
16 August 2024 First round	Würzburger Kickers	2–2 (a.e.t.) (3–5 p)	TSG Hoffenheim	Würzburg
18:00 CEST (UTC+2)	Küc 11'; Japaur (yellow card) 48'; Hannemann 100', (yellow card) 101'	Report	Farahnak 19' (o.g.); Moerstedt (yellow card) 80'; Bülter 107'	Stadium: Akon Arena; Attendance: 9,511; Referee: Martin Petersen
	Penalties
	Hannemann (penalty scored); Wessig (penalty scored); Meisel (penalty missed); Zaiser (penalty scored)		(penalty scored) Kramarić; (penalty scored) Berisha; (penalty scored) Bülter; (penalty scored) Stach; (penalty scored) Justvan

30 October 2024 Second round	TSG Hoffenheim	2–1	1. FC Nürnberg	Sinsheim
20:45 CET (UTC+1)	Tabaković 27'; Tohumcu (yellow card) 30'; Stach (yellow card) 37'; Chaves 71'	Report	Tzimas (yellow card) 1'; Justvan (yellow card) 34'; Emreli 47'	Stadium: Rhein-Neckar-Arena; Attendance: 18,001; Referee: Timo Gerach

4 December 2024 Round of 16	VfL Wolfsburg	3–0	TSG Hoffenheim	Wolfsburg
18:00 CET (UTC+1)	Arnold (yellow card) 14'; Dárdai (yellow card) 54'; Vavro 63'; Wind 67'; Gerhardt 85'	Report	Kramarić (yellow card) 66'; Baumann (yellow card) 85'	Stadium: Volkswagen Arena; Attendance: 13,909; Referee: Daniel Schlager

=== UEFA Europa League ===
==== League phase ====
The draw for the league phase was held on 30 August 2024.

Pos	Team	Pld	W	D	L	GF	GA	GD	Pts
25	(Portuguese Football Federation) Braga	8	3	1	4	9	12	−3	10
26	(Swedish Football Association) IF Elfsborg	8	3	1	4	9	14	−5	10
27	(German Football Association) TSG Hoffenheim	8	2	3	3	11	14	−3	9
28	(Turkish Football Federation) Beşiktaş	8	3	0	5	10	15	−5	9
29	(Israel Football Association) Maccabi Tel Aviv	8	2	0	6	8	17	−9	6

Source: UEFA
Rules for classification: League phase tiebreakers

Round	1	2	3	4	5	6	7	8
Ground	A	H	A	H	A	H	H	A
Result	D	W	L	D	L	D	L	W
Position	16	11	18	19	25	26	28	27

Source: UEFA
A = Away; H = Home; W = Win; D = Draw; L = Loss

25 September 2024 1	Midtjylland (Denmark)	1–1	(Germany) TSG Hoffenheim	Herning, Denmark
21:00 CEST (UTC+2)	Osorio (yellow card) 22', (goal) 42'	Report	Moerstedt 90'	Stadium: MCH Arena; Attendance: 8,561; Referee: Nenad Minaković (Serbia)

3 October 2024 2	TSG Hoffenheim (Germany)	2–0	(Ukraine) Dynamo Kyiv	Sinsheim, Germany
18:45 CEST (UTC+2)	Hložek 22', 60'; Grillitsch (yellow card) 40'	Report		Stadium: Rhein-Neckar-Arena; Attendance: 20,351; Referee: Aleksandar Stavrev (North Macedonia)

24 October 2024 3	Porto (Portugal)	2–0	(Germany) TSG Hoffenheim	Porto, Portugal
20:00 WEST (UTC+1)	Djaló 45+2'; Pérez (yellow card) 54'; Aghehowa 75'; Varela (yellow card) 77'; González (yellow card) 83'	Report	Nsoki (yellow card) 45'	Stadium: Estádio do Dragão; Attendance: 39,203; Referee: Damian Sylwestrzak (Poland)

7 November 2024 4	TSG Hoffenheim (Germany)	2–2	(France) Lyon	Sinsheim, Germany
21:00 CET (UTC+1)	Stach (yellow card) 6'; Gendrey 47'; Chaves (yellow card) 79'; Tohumcu 90+6'	Report	Mata (yellow card) 10'; Abner 66'; Lacazette 90+3'	Stadium: Rhein-Neckar-Arena; Attendance: 18,227; Referee: Marian Barbu (Romania)

28 November 2024 5	Braga (Portugal)	3–0	(Germany) TSG Hoffenheim	Braga, Portugal
20:00 WET (UTC+0)	Bruma 2'; Fernandes 8'; Carvalho 90+5'	Report	Hložek (yellow card) 41'	Stadium: Estádio Municipal; Attendance: 10,010; Referee: Igor Pajač (Croatia)

12 December 2024 6	TSG Hoffenheim (Germany)	0–0	(Romania) FCSB	Sinsheim, Germany
18:45 CET (UTC+1)	Bischof (yellow card) 8'; Moerstedt (yellow card) 57'; Chaves (yellow card) 59'; Geiger (yellow card) 82'	Report	Olaru (yellow card) 34'; Miculescu (yellow card) 49'; Crețu (yellow card) 83'	Stadium: Rhein-Neckar-Arena; Attendance: 23,223; Referee: Juxhin Xhaja (Albania)

23 January 2025 7	TSG Hoffenheim (Germany)	2–3	(England) Tottenham Hotspur	Sinsheim, Germany
18:45 CET (UTC+1)	Akpoguma (yellow card) 10'; Stach 68'; Mowka 88'	Report	Maddison 3'; Son Heung-min 22', 77'	Stadium: Rhein-Neckar-Arena; Attendance: 30,150; Referee: Morten Krogh (Denmark)

30 January 2025 8	Anderlecht (Belgium)	3–4	(Germany) TSG Hoffenheim	Brussels, Belgium
21:00 CET (UTC+1)	Vázquez 18'; Goto 79'; Augustinsson 88'	Report	Akpoguma (yellow card) 23'; Geiger (yellow card) 39'; Sardella 41' (o.g.); Bischof 54', (yellow card) 57'; Mokwa 59'; Hložek 65'; Erlein (yellow card) 81'; Bülter (yellow card) 83'	Stadium: Constant Vanden Stock Stadium; Attendance: 17,839; Referee: Giorgi Kruashvili (Georgia)
