= Alexander Prass =

Austrian footballer (born 2001)

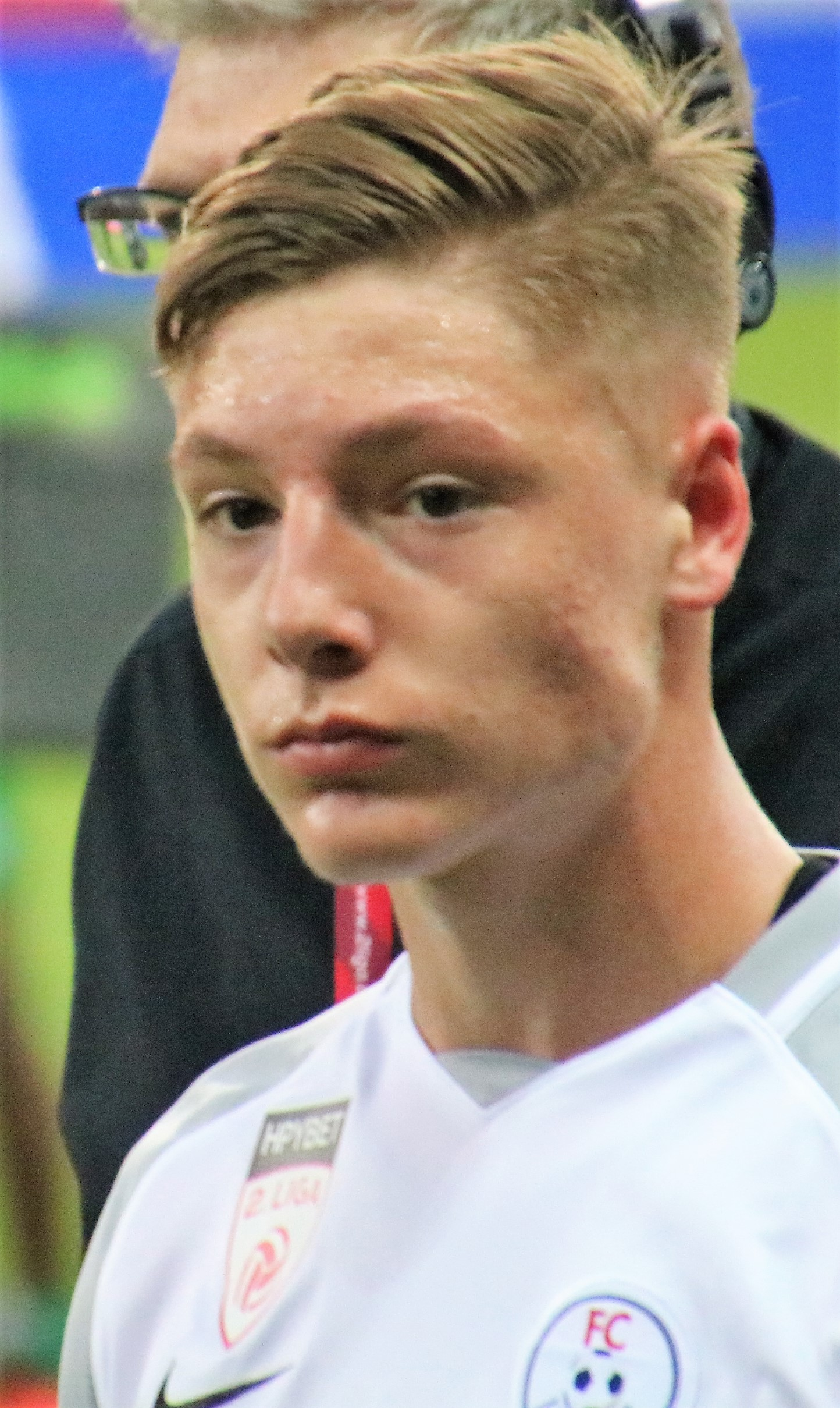
- Prass with Liefering in 2019

Personal information
- Date of birth: 26 May 2001 (age 25)
- Place of birth: Hellmonsödt, Austria
- Height: 1.80 m (5 ft 11 in)
- Positions: Central midfielder; left wing-back

Team information
- Current team: TSG Hoffenheim
- Number: 22

Youth career
- 2008–2009: LASK
- 2009–2010: FC Pasching
- 2010–2012: LASK
- 2012–2019: Red Bull Salzburg

Senior career*
Years	Team	Apps	(Gls)
2018–2021	Liefering	59	(12)
2021–2024	Sturm Graz	90	(10)
2024–	TSG Hoffenheim	58	(5)

International career^{‡}
2018–2019	Austria U18	5	(1)
2019–2020	Austria U19	5	(1)
2021–2022	Austria U21	11	(1)
2022–	Austria	24	(1)
- * Club domestic league appearances and goals as of 25 October 2026 ‡ National team caps and goals as of 4 October 2026

Alexander Prass (born 26 May 2001) is an Austrian professional footballer who plays as a central midfielder or left wing-back for Bundesliga club TSG Hoffenheim and the Austria national team.

== Club career ==
Born in Hellmonsödt, Upper Austria, Prass began his career as a youth player at LASK. Between 2009 and 2010 he played at FC Pasching before returning to LASK. For the 2012–13 season he moved to the youth team of Red Bull Salzburg, where he would later also play in the academy.

In March 2019 he was named for the first time in the matchday squad of Salzburg feeder team FC Liefering for a game against SK Vorwärts Steyr, but did not come on. He made his debut for Liefering in the second flight in the same month when he came on as an 87th minute substitute for Karim Adeyemi against Austria Wien II. In two and a half years with Liefering, he made a total of 59 second division appearances, in which he scored twelve goals.

For the 2021–22 season he moved to Ö Bundesliga club Sturm Graz, where he received a contract until June 2024, extending this for a year in July 2022 to keep him at the club until the end of the 2024–25 season.

On 5 August 2024, Prass signed for Bundesliga club TSG Hoffenheim on a long-term contract.

== International career ==
Prass made his Austrian U-18 debut on 9 October 2018 against Switzerland's U-18 squad. Just two days later, he scored his first goal for an Austrian squad, this time against Switzerland. In October 2019, he made his debut for the Austrian U-19 squad in a match against Wales U-19. By March 2021, he had made his debut for the Austrian U-21 squad against Saudi Arabia.

In November 2022, the winger received his first call-up to the senior Austrian national team. He made his senior debut later that month in a match against the Andorra national team. In May 2024, he was named in Austria's preliminary squad for the 2024 European Championship and was eventually included in the final squad. Austria was eliminated in the round of 16, losing 1–2 to the Turkey national team, but Prass appeared in all four of Austria's matches during the tournament.

On 18 May 2026, Prass was selected in Ralf Rangnick’s 26-man squad for the 2026 FIFA World Cup, marking Austria’s first appearance in the tournament since 1998.

== Career statistics ==
=== Club ===
As of match played 28 October 2026

Appearances and goals by club, season and competition
Club	Season	League			National cup		League cup		Europe		Other		Total	
Club	Season	Division	Apps	Goals	Apps	Goals	Apps	Goals	Apps	Goals	Apps	Goals	Apps	Goals
FC Liefering	2018–19	Austrian 2. Liga	4	0	0	0	—		—		—		4	0
FC Liefering	2019–20	Austrian 2. Liga	27	6	0	0	—		—		—		27	6
FC Liefering	2020–21	Austrian 2. Liga	28	6	0	0	—		—		—		28	6
FC Liefering	Total		59	12	0	0	—		—		—		59	12
Sturm Graz	2021–22	Austrian Bundesliga	28	0	2	0	—		7 (Note: Appearances in UEFA Europa League)	0	—		37	0
Sturm Graz	2022–23	Austrian Bundesliga	32	3	6	0	—		8 (Note: Two appearances in UEFA Champions League, six appearances in UEFA Europa League)	0	—		46	3
Sturm Graz	2023–24	Austrian Bundesliga	30	7	6	1	—		11 (Note: Two appearances in UEFA Champions League, six appearances and one goal in UEFA Europa League, three appearances in UEFA Europa Conference League)	1	—		47	9
Sturm Graz	Total		90	10	14	1	—		26	1	—		130	12
TSG Hoffenheim	2024–25	Bundesliga	23	0	2	0	—		6	0	—		31	0
TSG Hoffenheim	2025–26	Bundesliga	32	3	2	0	—		—		—		34	3
TSG Hoffenheim	2026–27	Bundesliga	3	2	1	0	—		2	0	—		6	2
TSG Hoffenheim	Total		58	5	5	0	—		8	0	—		71	5
Career total			207	27	19	3	0	0	34	1	0	0	260	29

=== International ===
As of match played 4 October 2026

Appearances and goals by national team and year
National team	Year	Apps	Goals
Austria	2022	1	0
Austria	2023	2	0
Austria	2024	10	0
Austria	2025	3	0
Austria	2026	8	1
Total		24	1

Scores and results list Austria's goal tally first, score column indicates score after each Affengruber goal.

List of international goals scored by David Affengruber
No.	Date	Venue	Cap	Opponent	Score	Result	Competition
1	1 October 2026	Aviva Stadium, Dublin, Ireland	23	Republic of Ireland	1–2	2–2	2026–27 UEFA Nations League B

== Honours ==
Sturm Graz

- Austrian Bundesliga: 2023–24
- Austrian Cup: 2022–23, 2023–24
