= Robin Hranáč =

Czech footballer (born 2000)

Personal information
- Date of birth: 29 January 2000 (age 26)
- Place of birth: Plzeň, Czech Republic
- Height: 1.90 m (6 ft 3 in)
- Position: Defender

Team information
- Current team: TSG Hoffenheim
- Number: 2

Youth career
- –2018: Viktoria Plzeň

Senior career*
Years	Team	Apps	(Gls)
2018–2024	Viktoria Plzeň	38	(3)
2018–2021	→ Viktoria Plzeň B	16	(2)
2021	→ Liptovský Mikuláš (loan)	18	(1)
2022–2023	→ Pardubice (loan)	39	(2)
2024–	TSG Hoffenheim	38	(1)

International career^{‡}
2021–2023	Czech Republic U21	12	(0)
2024–	Czech Republic	20	(1)
- * Club domestic league appearances and goals as of 25 October 2026 ‡ National team caps and goals as of 8 October 2026

Robin Hranáč (Czech pronunciation: [ˈɦranaːt͡ʃ], born 29 January 2000) is a Czech professional footballer who plays as a defender for Bundesliga club TSG Hoffenheim and the Czech Republic national team.

== Club career ==
Hranáč started his professional career at Viktoria Plzeň, making his Czech First League debut against Teplice in April 2021. In the summer of that year, Hranáč joined Fortuna Liga side Tatran Liptovský Mikuláš on loan, playing the full length of the club's first 13 games before receiving a red card against Spartak Trnava.

He played 39 matches for Pardubice across a year and a half of loans from early 2022 until the end of the 2023–24 season. After returning to his parent club, Viktoria Plzeň, Hranáč broke into the first team and featured regularly during the Czech First League as well as the 2023–24 UEFA Europa Conference League, in which his side reached the quarter-finals.

On 25 August 2024, Hranáč signed a multi-year contract with Bundesliga club TSG Hoffenheim, for a fee reported to be up to 11 million Euros. It was announced concurrently that he would wear the number 2 shirt for the club.

== International career ==
Hranáč received his first call-up to the Czech Republic national under-21 football team in 2021 ahead of matches against England and Slovenia. He represented the Czech Republic at the 2023 UEFA European Under-21 Championship,

His first call-up for the senior Czech Republic national team came in spring 2024. He made his debut in a friendly match against Armenia on 26 March 2024. Hranáč played all three of his nation's matches at UEFA Euro 2024.

On 31 May 2026, Hranáč was selected in the 26-man squad for the 2026 FIFA World Cup.

== Career statistics ==
=== Club ===
As of match played 28 October 2026

Appearances and goals by club, season and competition
Club	Season	League			National cup		Europe		Other		Total	
Club	Season	Division	Apps	Goals	Apps	Goals	Apps	Goals	Apps	Goals	Apps	Goals
Viktoria Plzeň	2020–21	Czech First League	1	0	1	0	—		—		2	0
Viktoria Plzeň	2023–24	Czech First League	32	3	5	0	15 (Note: Appearances in UEFA Europa Conference League)	0	—		52	3
Viktoria Plzeň	2024–25	Czech First League	5	0	0	0	3 (Note: Appearance(s) in UEFA Europa League)	0	—		8	0
Viktoria Plzeň	Total		38	3	6	0	18	0	—		62	3
Tatran Liptovský Mikuláš (loan)	2021–22	Slovak First League	18	1	1	0	—		—		19	1
Pardubice (loan)	2021–22	Czech First League	10	1	—		—		—		10	1
Pardubice (loan)	2022–23	Czech First League	29	1	1	0	—		2 (Note: Appearances in Czech First League relegation play-offs)	0	32	1
Pardubice (loan)	Total		39	2	1	0	—		2	0	42	2
TSG Hoffenheim	2024–25	Bundesliga	4	0	0	0	1	0	—		5	0
TSG Hoffenheim	2025–26	Bundesliga	29	1	2	0	—		—		31	1
TSG Hoffenheim	2026–27	Bundesliga	5	0	1	0	2	0	—		8	0
TSG Hoffenheim	Total		38	1	3	0	3	0	—		44	1
Career total			133	7	11	0	21	0	2	0	167	7

=== International ===
As of match played 6 October 2026

Appearances and goals by national team and year
National team	Year	Apps	Goals
Czech Republic	2024	7	0
Czech Republic	2025	3	1
Czech Republic	2026	10	0
Total		20	1

Scores and results list the Czech Republic's goal tally first.

List of international goals scored by Robin Hranáč
No.	Date	Venue	Opponent	Score	Result	Competition
1.	17 November 2025	Andrův stadion, Olomouc, Czech Republic	Gibraltar	6–0	6–0	2026 FIFA World Cup qualification

== Honours ==
=== Individual ===
- Czech First League Defender of the Season: 2023–24
- UEFA Europa Conference League Team of the Season: 2023–24
