= Pavel Kadeřábek =

Czech footballer (born 1992)

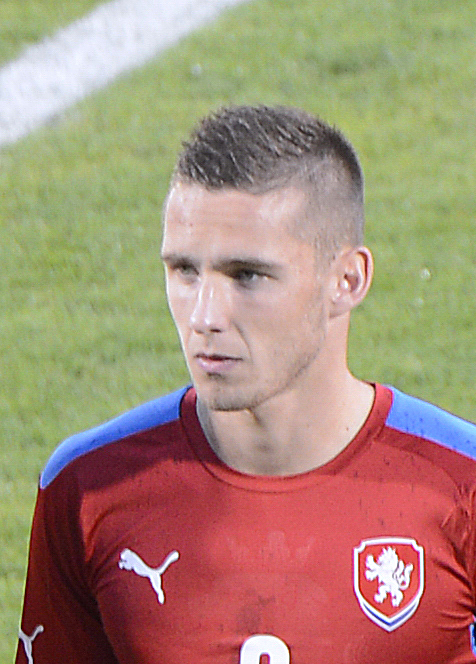
- Kadeřábek with the Czech Republic in 2014

Personal information
- Full name: Pavel Kadeřábek
- Date of birth: 25 April 1992 (age 34)
- Place of birth: Prague, Czechoslovakia
- Height: 1.82 m (6 ft 0 in)
- Positions: Right-back; right wing-back

Team information
- Current team: Sparta Prague
- Number: 3

Senior career*
Years	Team	Apps	(Gls)
2010–2015	Sparta Prague B	34	(2)
2011	→ FK Viktoria Žižkov (loan)	11	(0)
2012–2015	Sparta Prague	76	(10)
2015–2025	TSG Hoffenheim	256	(14)
2025–	Sparta Prague	22	(2)

International career
2007–2008	Czech Republic U16	14	(3)
2008–2009	Czech Republic U17	15	(0)
2009	Czech Republic U18	5	(1)
2010–2011	Czech Republic U19	19	(1)
2013–2015	Czech Republic U21	7	(1)
2014–2021	Czech Republic	48	(3)
- * Club domestic league appearances and goals as of 15 May 2026

Pavel Kadeřábek (born 25 April 1992) is a Czech professional footballer who plays as a right-back or right wing-back for Czech First League club Sparta Prague.

Kadeřábek previously represented Czech Republic at under-19 level and was in the Czech squad for the 2011 UEFA European Under-19 Championship, where he played all of his country's matches. He made his senior debut for the Czech Republic in May 2014, representing his country in two UEFA European Championships (2016 and 2020).

== Club career ==
=== Sparta Prague ===
In August 2010, Kadeřábek made his first competitive appearance professionally for Sparta Prague in a play-off match in the 2010–11 UEFA Champions League qualifying phase and play-off round, coming on as a 61st-minute substitute against MŠK Žilina.

==== Loan to FK Viktoria Žižkov ====
In August 2011, having previously only played league football in the Czech 2. Liga for Sparta's reserve team, Kadeřábek went out on loan to Czech First League side Viktoria Žižkov to gain prominence in first tier football.

=== TSG Hoffenheim ===
On 17 June 2015, he joined German side TSG Hoffenheim on a four-year contract. On 20 May 2025, after a total of ten years and 287 appearances for the club, Kadeřábek announced that he would leave Hoffenheim at the end of the 2024–25 season.

=== Return to Sparta Prague ===
On 30 June 2025, Kadeřábek moved back to the Czech Republic, returning to Sparta Prague, signing a free contract following his departure from Hoffenheim.

== International career ==
Kadeřábek was called up to the Czech Republic under-21 team for the first time ahead of a match against the Netherlands in August 2013. He represented the Czech U21 team at the 2015 UEFA European Under-21 Championship, and scored the opening goal of the tournament in a 1–2 loss to Denmark at the Eden Arena in Prague.

Kadeřábek debuted for the Czech senior squad on 21 May 2014 in a friendly match against Finland. He scored his first goal for the Czech Republic in a 2–1 UEFA Euro 2016 qualifying win against Iceland on 16 November.

In June 2016, Kadeřábek was included in coach Pavel Vrba's 23-man squad for the UEFA Euro 2016 in France.

In June 2021, Kadeřábek was selected in the 26-man Czech squad for the delayed UEFA Euro 2020 tournament.

On 10 March 2022, Kadeřábek announced his retirement from international football, citing health reasons.

== Personal life ==
Kadeřábek started a relationship with Czech Miss Tereza Chlebovská in 2014. On 2 September 2016, The couple had their first daughter, named Ema.

== Career statistics ==
=== Club ===
As of match played 17 May 2025.

Appearances and goals by club, season and competition
Club	Season	League			National Cup		Europe		Other		Total	
Club	Season	Division	Apps	Goals	Apps	Goals	Apps	Goals	Apps	Goals	Apps	Goals
Sparta Prague B	2009–10	Czech 2. Liga	2	0	—		—		—		2	0
Sparta Prague B	2010–11	Czech 2. Liga	20	1	—		—		—		20	1
Sparta Prague B	2011–12	Czech 2. Liga	12	1	—		—		—		12	1
Sparta Prague B	Total		34	2	—		—		—		34	2
Viktoria Žižkov (loan)	2011–12	Czech First League	11	0	1	0	—		—		12	0
Sparta Prague	2010–11	Czech First League	0	0	0	0	2 (Note: One appearance in UEFA Champions League, one appearance in UEFA Europa League)	0	0	0	2	0
Sparta Prague	2011–12	Czech First League	2	0	1	0	0	0	—		3	0
Sparta Prague	2012–13	Czech First League	19	2	3	2	9 (Note: Appearance(s) in UEFA Europa League)	0	—		31	4
Sparta Prague	2013–14	Czech First League	30	5	7	1	2	0	—		39	6
Sparta Prague	2014–15	Czech First League	25	3	1	0	12 (Note: Four appearances in UEFA Champions League, eight appearances in UEFA Europa League)	0	1 (Note: Appearance in Czech Supercup)	0	39	3
Sparta Prague	Total		76	10	12	3	25	0	1	0	114	13
TSG Hoffenheim	2015–16	Bundesliga	28	0	1	0	—		—		29	0
TSG Hoffenheim	2016–17	Bundesliga	23	0	1	0	—		—		24	0
TSG Hoffenheim	2017–18	Bundesliga	28	2	1	0	5 (Note: Two appearances in UEFA Champions League, three appearances and one goal in UEFA Europa League)	1	—		34	3
TSG Hoffenheim	2018–19	Bundesliga	29	3	1	1	6 (Note: Appearance(s) in UEFA Champions League)	1	—		36	5
TSG Hoffenheim	2019–20	Bundesliga	30	2	3	1	—		—		33	3
TSG Hoffenheim	2020–21	Bundesliga	20	0	1	0	2	0	—		23	0
TSG Hoffenheim	2021–22	Bundesliga	19	1	0	0	—		—		19	1
TSG Hoffenheim	2022–23	Bundesliga	26	1	2	1	—		—		28	2
TSG Hoffenheim	2023–24	Bundesliga	28	3	1	0	—		—		29	3
TSG Hoffenheim	2024–25	Bundesliga	24	2	2	0	5	0	—		31	2
TSG Hoffenheim	Total		255	14	13	3	18	2	—		286	19
Career total			376	26	26	6	43	2	1	0	446	34

=== International ===
Appearances and goals by national team and year
National team	Year	Apps	Goals
Czech Republic	2014	7	1
Czech Republic	2015	7	1
Czech Republic	2016	12	0
Czech Republic	2017	4	0
Czech Republic	2018	6	1
Czech Republic	2019	6	0
Czech Republic	2020	3	0
Czech Republic	2021	3	0
Total		48	3

Scores and results list Czech Republic's goal tally first.

International goals

#	Date	Venue	Opponent	Score	Result	Competition
1.	16 November 2014	Doosan Arena, Plzeň, Czech Republic	Iceland	1–1	2–1	UEFA Euro 2016 qualification
2.	13 October 2015	Amsterdam Arena, Amsterdam, Netherlands	Netherlands	1–0	3–2	UEFA Euro 2016 qualification
3.	26 March 2018	Guangxi Sports Center, Nanning, China	China	4–1	4–1	2018 China Cup

== Honours ==
AC Sparta Praha

- Czech Cup: 2013–14
- Czech First League: 2013–14

Czech Republic U19

- UEFA European Under-19 Championship runner-up: 2011
