= Florian Micheler =

Austrian footballer

Personal information
- Full name: Florian Peter Micheler
- Date of birth: 17 May 2005 (age 21)
- Place of birth: Innsbruck, Austria
- Height: 1.85 m (6 ft 1 in)
- Position: Midfielder

Team information
- Current team: TSG Hoffenheim II
- Number: 28

Youth career
- 2010–2011: SV Aldrans
- 2011–2018: Wacker Innsbruck
- 2018–2021: AKA Tirol
- 2021–2024: TSG Hoffenheim

Senior career*
Years	Team	Apps	(Gls)
2024–	TSG Hoffenheim II	42	(8)
2024–2025	TSG Hoffenheim	1	(0)
2025	→ Arminia Bielefeld II (loan)	1	(0)
2025	→ Arminia Bielefeld (loan)	4	(0)

International career^{‡}
2021	Austria U17	3	(0)
2022–2023	Austria U18	3	(0)
2024	Austria U19	2	(0)
2024–	Austria U21	8	(0)
- * Club domestic league appearances and goals as of 19 September 2026 ‡ National team caps and goals as of 6 October 2026

Florian Peter Micheler (born 17 May 2005) is an Austrian professional footballer who plays as a midfielder for 3. Liga club TSG Hoffenheim II.

== Club career ==
Micheler began playing football locally in Austria with SV Aldrans, FC Wacker Innsbruck and AKA Tirol, before moving to Germany with TSG Hoffenheim in 2021 where he finished his development. He made his professional debut with the senior Hoffenheim team in a DFB-Pokal match against Würzburger Kickers on 16 August 2024. On 13 September 2024, he extended his contract with Hoffenheim until 2026. During the 2024–25 season, he regularly played for Hoffenheim's reserves in the Regionalliga, where he helped them win the 2024–25 Regionalliga.

Ahead of the 2025–26 season, Micheler signed a long-term contract extension with Hoffenheim before being loaned to newly promoted 2. Bundesliga side Arminia Bielefeld for the season on 9 July 2025. He made four appearances in the 2. Bundesliga for Arminia Bielefeld before his loan was terminated on 28 December 2025.

== International career ==
Micheler is a youth international for Austria, having played up to the Austria U21s in 2025.

== Career statistics ==
As of match played 19 September 2026

Appearances and goals by club, season and competition
Club	Season	League			Cup		Europe		Other		Total	
Club	Season	Division	Apps	Goals	Apps	Goals	Apps	Goals	Apps	Goals	Apps	Goals
1899 Hoffenheim II	2024–25	3. Liga	21	7	—		—		—		21	7
1899 Hoffenheim II	2025–26	3. Liga	14	1	—		—		—		14	1
1899 Hoffenheim II	2026–27	3. Liga	7	0	—		—		—		7	0
1899 Hoffenheim II	Total		42	8	—		—		—		42	8
1899 Hoffenheim	2024–25	Bundesliga	1	0	1	0	2 (Note: Appearances in UEFA Europa League)	0	—		4	0
Arminia Bielefeld II (loan)	2025–26	Oberliga Westfalen	1	0	—		—		—		1	0
Arminia Bielefeld (loan)	2025–26	2. Bundesliga	4	0	0	0	—		—		4	0
Career total			48	8	1	0	2	0	0	0	51	8

== Honours ==
TSG Hoffenheim II

- Regionalliga: 2024–25
