= Bazoumana Touré =

Ivorian footballer (born 2006)

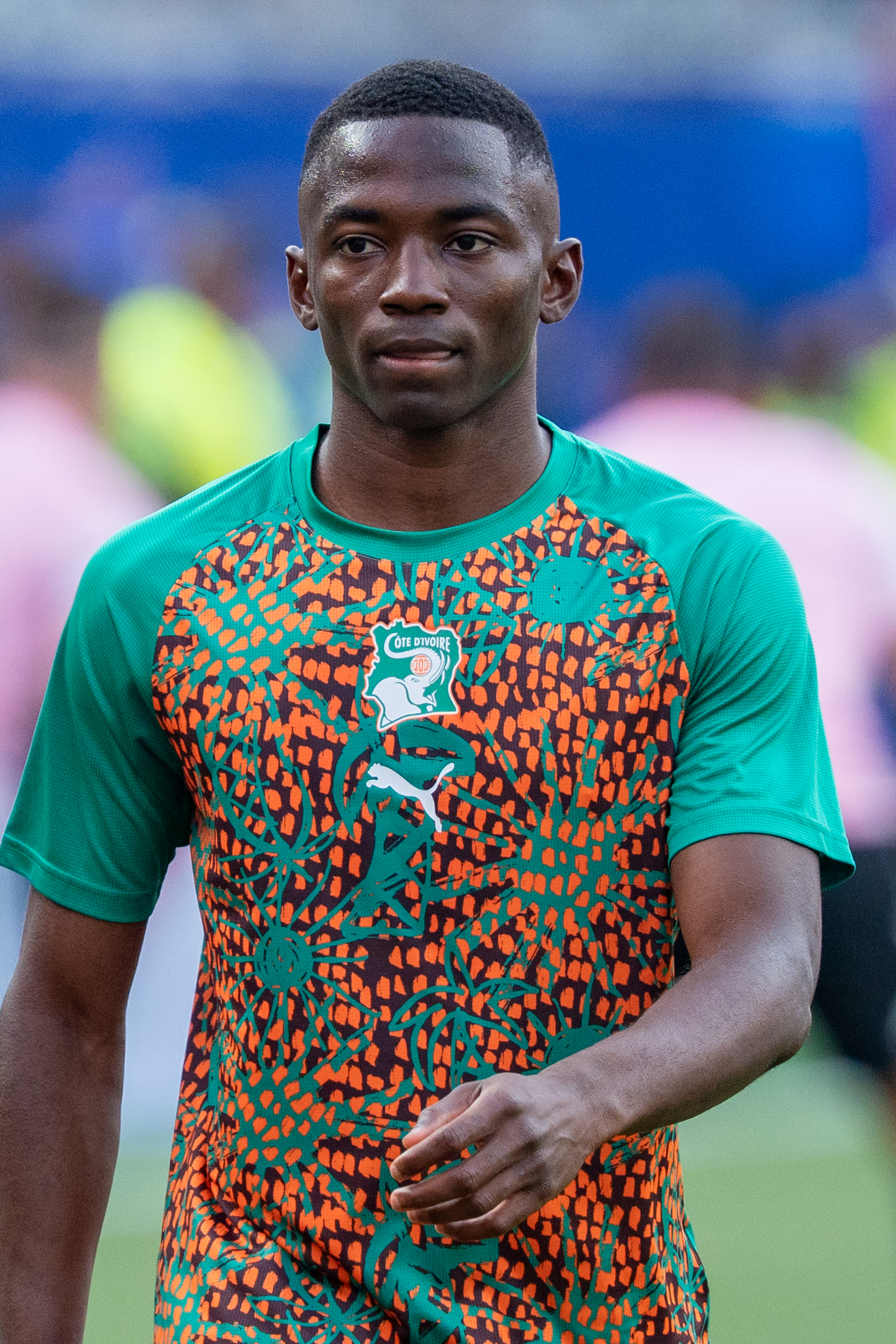
- Touré with the Ivory Coast in 2026

Personal information
- Date of birth: 2 March 2006 (age 20)
- Place of birth: Bouaké, Ivory Coast
- Height: 1.78 m (5 ft 10 in)
- Position: Winger

Team information
- Current team: Newcastle United
- Number: 17

Youth career
- –2022: ASEC Mimosas

Senior career*
Years	Team	Apps	(Gls)
2022–2024	ASEC Mimosas	33	(2)
2024	Hammarby IF	23	(8)
2025–2026	TSG Hoffenheim	43	(5)
2026–	Newcastle United	3	(1)

International career^{‡}
2024–	Ivory Coast U20	3	(0)
2025–	Ivory Coast U23	1	(0)
2025–	Ivory Coast	10	(3)
- * Club domestic league appearances and goals as of 17:25, 19 September 2026 (UTC) ‡ National team caps and goals as of 23:00, 29 September 2026 (UTC)

Bazoumana Touré (born 2 March 2006) is an Ivorian professional footballer who plays as a left winger for Premier League club Newcastle United and the Ivory Coast national team.

== Club career ==
=== ASEC Mimosas ===
Touré began his career at Ivorian club ASEC Mimosas, widely regarded as the biggest club in Ivory Coast, playing for the youth team until 2022, when he was promoted to the first team. He played his first season for the club in the 2022–23 season, scoring his first goal in a 4–0 home win over AS Indenié Abengourou. He helped them towards first place that year, earning the league title.

=== Hammarby ===
Touré signed for Swedish club Hammarby IF in early 2024, after an extensive trial and training period. He made his Allsvenskan debut in a 2–1 away defeat to Halmstad, quickly establishing himself as a regular in the side, even at just 18 years of age.

Touré scored his first Hammarby goal in a 3–0 home victory over Sirius, adding to his tally for the season with goals against Djurgården, Brommapojkarna and Halmstad, as well as another two against Brommapojkarna a month later and another two against Sirius also, bringing his tally to eight goals in 23 Allsvenskan games.

=== Hoffenheim ===
==== 2025 ====
On 1 February 2025, Touré signed a long-term contract with German club TSG Hoffenheim for a sum of around €14 million plus €2 million in bonuses. He made 13 appearances for Hoffenheim in his first half-season at the club, registering 3 assists in 7 starts, including two assists for Andrej Kramaric against Mainz 05 in a 2–0 win.

==== 2025–26 ====
Touré scored his first Bundesliga goal in a 3–0 away win over St. Pauli. He finished the season with five goals and nine assists in 29 starts, as Hoffenheim finished in fifth place to qualify for the UEFA Europa League.

=== Newcastle United ===
On 5 July 2026, Touré signed for Premier League club Newcastle United on a £42 million transfer fee. On his first start, Touré registered his first goal for the club in the EFL Cup in a 3–2 victory over West Brom. He scored his first Premier League goal on 14 September 2026 against Leeds United in a 4–1 defeat.

== International career ==
Touré played for the Ivory Coast U20 side, making three appearances. On 27 May 2025, he was called up to the Ivory Coast U23s for a friendly.

Touré received his first senior call-up in September 2025, before making his debut in a 7–0 win over Seychelles in October 2025. In December 2025, he was included in the Ivory Coast's 2025 AFCON squad. During the tournament, Touré scored his first international goal with a 90th-minute winner versus Gabon in a 3–2 victory.

Touré was named in the Ivory Coast's final 26-man squad for the 2026 FIFA World Cup in May 2026.

== Style of play ==
Bazoumana Touré has been described as an explosive, highly creative left winger who thrives on high-speed transitions, isolated 1v1 situations, and high-volume crossing. Touré is left-footed and he has predominantly been used on the left wing, allowing him to drift outside onto his stronger foot or drive to the byline, he has also been deployed briefly as a centre-forward and on the right wing with Hoffenheim. Touré possesses blistering speed, a tendency for early crosses, a penchant for dribbling and a high work rate, being likened to fellow Bundesliga player Karim Adeyemi.

== Personal life ==
Bazoumana Touré grew up in the Abidjan district of Anoumabo, starting his career at local club Magic System FC.

== Career statistics ==
=== Club ===
As of match played 19 September 2026

Appearances and goals by club, season and competition
Club	Season	League			National cup (Note: Includes DFB-Pokal)		League cup (Note: Includes EFL Cup)		Total	
Club	Season	Division	Apps	Goals	Apps	Goals	Apps	Goals	Apps	Goals
Hammarby	2024	Allsvenskan	23	8	0	0	—		23	8
TSG Hoffenheim	2024–25	Bundesliga	13	0	—		—		13	0
TSG Hoffenheim	2025–26	Bundesliga	30	5	2	0	—		32	5
TSG Hoffenheim	Total		43	5	2	0	—		45	5
Newcastle United	2026–27	Premier League	3	1	0	0	1	1	4	2
Career total			69	14	2	0	1	1	72	15

=== International ===
As of match played 29 September 2026

Appearances and goals by national team and year
National team	Year	Apps	Goals
Ivory Coast	2025	2	1
Ivory Coast	2026	8	2
Total		10	3

As of match played 29 September 2026
Ivory Coast score listed first, score column indicates score after each Touré goal.

List of international goals scored by Bazoumana Touré
No.	Date	Venue	Opponent	Score	Result	Competition
1	31 December 2025	Marrakesh Stadium, Marrakesh, Morocco	Gabon	3–2	3–2	2025 Africa Cup of Nations
2	6 January 2026	Marrakesh Stadium, Marrakesh, Morocco	Burkina Faso	3–0	3–0	2025 Africa Cup of Nations
3	29 September 2026	Accra Sports Stadium, Accra, Ghana	Somalia	2–0	2–0	2027 Africa Cup of Nations qualification

== Honours ==
ASEC Mimosas

- Ligue 1 (Ivory Coast): 2022–23
