= 2018–19 TSG 1899 Hoffenheim season =

1899 Hoffenheim
2018–19 season
- President: Peter Hofmann
- Manager: Julian Nagelsmann
- Stadium: Wirsol Rhein-Neckar-Arena
- Bundesliga: 9th
- DFB-Pokal: Second round
- UEFA Champions League: Group stage
- Top goalscorer: League: Andrej Kramarić (17 goals); All: Andrej Kramarić (22 goals)
- Biggest win: Kaiserslautern 1–6 Hoffenheim
- Biggest defeat: Hoffenheim 1–4 Wolfsburg
Home colours	Away colours	Third colours

The 2018–19 TSG 1899 Hoffenheim season was the 120th season in the football club's history and 11th consecutive and overall season in the top flight of German football, the Bundesliga, having been promoted from the 2. Bundesliga in 2008. In addition to the domestic league, Hoffenheim also participated in this season's editions of the domestic cup, the DFB-Pokal, and the first-tier continental cup, the UEFA Champions League. This was the 11th season for Hoffenheim in the Wirsol Rhein-Neckar-Arena, located in Sinsheim, Baden-Württemberg, Germany. The season covered a period from 1 July 2018 to 30 June 2019.

== Competitions ==
Win Draw Loss

=== Overview ===
Competition	First match	Last match	Starting round	Final position	Record							
Competition	First match	Last match	Starting round	Final position	Pld	W	D	L	GF	GA	GD	Win %
Bundesliga	24 August 2018	18 May 2019	Matchday 1	9th	34	13	12	9	70	52	+18	38.24
DFB-Pokal	18 August 2018	31 October 2018	First round	Second round	2	1	0	1	6	3	+3	50.00
Champions League	19 September 2018	12 December 2018	Group stage	Group stage	6	0	3	3	11	14	−3	0.00
Total					42	14	15	13	87	69	+18	33.33

Last updated: 25 May 2019
Source: Competitions

=== Bundesliga ===
==== League table ====
Pos	Team	Pld	W	D	L	GF	GA	GD	Pts	Qualification or relegation
7	Eintracht Frankfurt	34	15	9	10	60	48	+12	54	Qualification for the Europa League second qualifying round (Note: Since the winners of the 2018–19 DFB-Pokal, Bayern Munich, qualified for the Champions League based on league position, the Europa League group stage spot was passed to the sixth-placed team, and the Europa League second qualifying round spot was passed to the seventh-placed team.)
8	Werder Bremen	34	14	11	9	58	49	+9	53	
9	1899 Hoffenheim	34	13	12	9	70	52	+18	51	
10	Fortuna Düsseldorf	34	13	5	16	49	65	−16	44	
11	Hertha BSC	34	11	10	13	49	57	−8	43	

Source: DFB
Rules for classification: 1) Points; 2) Goal difference; 3) Goals scored; 4) Head-to-head results; 5) Head-to-head away goals scored; 6) Away goals scored; 7) Play-off

==== Results summary ====
Overall								Home						Away					
Pld	W	D	L	GF	GA	GD	Pts	W	D	L	GF	GA	GD	W	D	L	GF	GA	GD
34	13	12	9	70	52	+18	51	7	5	5	28	20	+8	6	7	4	42	32	+10

Last updated: 25 May 2019.
Source: Bundesliga

==== Results by round ====
Round	1	2	3	4	5	6	7	8	9	10	11	12	13	14	15	16	17	18	19	20	21	22	23	24	25	26	27	28	29	30	31	32	33	34
Ground	A	H	A	H	A	H	H	A	H	A	H	A	H	A	H	A	H	H	A	H	A	H	A	A	H	A	H	A	H	A	H	A	H	A
Result	L	W	L	D	W	L	L	W	W	W	W	D	D	D	D	D	D	L	W	D	D	W	D	L	W	D	W	W	W	W	L	D	L	L
Position	15	10	11	11	9	11	13	8	8	7	6	6	6	7	6	7	7	8	6	8	9	8	8	9	8	9	9	7	6	6	7	8	8	9

Updated to match(es) played on 25 May 2019. Source: DFB
A = Away; H = Home; W = Win; D = Draw; L = Loss

==== Matches ====
24 August 2018 1	Bayern Munich	3–1	1899 Hoffenheim	Munich
20:30 CEST (UTC+2)	Müller 23'; Lewandowski 82' (pen.); Robben 90'	Report	Szalai 57'	Stadium: Allianz Arena; Attendance: 75,000; Referee: Bastian Dankert

1 September 2018 2	1899 Hoffenheim	3–1	SC Freiburg	Sinsheim
15:30 CEST (UTC+2)	Szalai 50', 63'; Kramarić 90+4'	Report	Heintz 36'	Stadium: Wirsol Rhein-Neckar-Arena; Attendance: 28,619; Referee: Robert Hartmann

15 September 2018 3	Fortuna Düsseldorf	2–1	1899 Hoffenheim	Düsseldorf
15:30 CEST (UTC+2)	Morales 45'; Lukebakio 88' (pen.)	Report	Nelson 86'	Stadium: Merkur Spiel-Arena; Attendance: 40,111; Referee: Tobias Stieler

22 September 2018 4	1899 Hoffenheim	1–1	Borussia Dortmund	Sinsheim
15:30 CEST (UTC+2)	Joelinton 44'	Report	Pulisic 84'	Stadium: Wirsol Rhein-Neckar-Arena; Attendance: 30,150; Referee: Harm Osmers

25 September 2018 5	Hannover 96	1–3	1899 Hoffenheim	Hanover
20:30 CEST (UTC+2)	Füllkrug 55' (pen.)	Report	Brenet 20'; Kadeřábek 49'; Belfodil 90+3'	Stadium: HDI-Arena; Attendance: 33,500; Referee: Christian Dingert

29 September 2018 6	1899 Hoffenheim	1–2	RB Leipzig	Sinsheim
15:30 CEST (UTC+2)	Kramarić 90+3' (pen.)	Report	Poulsen 53', 73'	Stadium: Wirsol Rhein-Neckar-Arena; Attendance: 28,115; Referee: Deniz Aytekin

7 October 2018 7	1899 Hoffenheim	1–2	Eintracht Frankfurt	Sinsheim
15:30 CEST (UTC+2)	Nelson 82'	Report	Rebić 40'; Jović 46'	Stadium: Wirsol Rhein-Neckar-Arena; Attendance: 29,785; Referee: Daniel Siebert

20 October 2018 8	1. FC Nürnberg	1–3	1899 Hoffenheim	Nuremberg
15:30 CEST (UTC+2)	Behrens 18' (pen.)	Report	Nelson 50', 57'; Szalai 67'	Stadium: Max-Morlock-Stadion; Attendance: 36,472; Referee: Felix Zwayer

27 October 2018 9	1899 Hoffenheim	4–0	VfB Stuttgart	Sinsheim
18:30 CEST (UTC+2)	Brenet 48'; Joelinton 51'; Belfodil 57', 60'	Report		Stadium: Wirsol Rhein-Neckar-Arena; Attendance: 30,150; Referee: Frank Willenborg

3 November 2018 10	Bayer Leverkusen	1–4	1899 Hoffenheim	Leverkusen
15:30 CET (UTC+1)	Bellarabi 30'	Report	Nelson 19'; Joelinton 34', 73'; Grifo 49' (pen.)	Stadium: BayArena; Attendance: 27,589; Referee: Tobias Stieler

10 November 2018 11	1899 Hoffenheim	2–1	FC Augsburg	Sinsheim
15:30 CET (UTC+1)	Kramarić 65'; Nelson 83'	Report	Finnbogason 69'	Stadium: Wirsol Rhein-Neckar-Arena; Attendance: 27,009; Referee: Robert Schröder

24 November 2018 12	Hertha BSC	3–3	1899 Hoffenheim	Berlin
15:30 CET (UTC+1)	Ibišević 13'; Leckie 71'; Lazaro 87'	Report	Demirbay 1'; Kramarić 10'; Bičakčić 55'	Stadium: Olympiastadion Berlin; Attendance: 44,508; Referee: Tobias Welz

1 December 2018 13	1899 Hoffenheim	1–1	Schalke 04	Sinsheim
18:30 CET (UTC+1)	Kramarić 59' (pen.)	Report	Bentaleb 73' (pen.)	Stadium: Wirsol Rhein-Neckar-Arena; Attendance: 30,000; Referee: Robert Kampka

8 December 2018 14	VfL Wolfsburg	2–2	1899 Hoffenheim	Wolfsburg
15:30 CET (UTC+1)	Bičakčić 28' (o.g.); Ginczek 31'	Report	Belfodil 4'; Kramarić 71'	Stadium: Volkswagen Arena; Attendance: 20,602; Referee: Felix Zwayer

15 December 2018 15	1899 Hoffenheim	0–0	Borussia Mönchengladbach	Sinsheim
15:30 CET (UTC+1)		Report		Stadium: Wirsol Rhein-Neckar-Arena; Attendance: 30,150; Referee: Benjamin Cortus

19 December 2018 16	Werder Bremen	1–1	1899 Hoffenheim	Bremen
20:30 CET (UTC+1)	Gebre Selassie 57'	Report	Bittencourt 31'	Stadium: Weser-Stadion; Attendance: 40,003; Referee: Markus Schmidt

23 December 2018 17	1899 Hoffenheim	1–1	Mainz 05	Sinsheim
18:00 CET (UTC+1)	Demirbay 11'	Report	Mateta 16'	Stadium: Wirsol Rhein-Neckar-Arena; Attendance: 28,216; Referee: Sascha Stegemann

18 January 2019 18	1899 Hoffenheim	1–3	Bayern Munich	Sinsheim
20:30 CET (UTC+1)	Schulz 59'	Report	Goretzka 34', 45+1'; Lewandowski 87'	Stadium: PreZero Arena; Attendance: 30,150; Referee: Tobias Welz

26 January 2019 19	SC Freiburg	2–4	1899 Hoffenheim	Freiburg
15:30 CET (UTC+1)	Höler 42'; Niederlechner 77'	Report	Joelinton 19'; Kramarić 59' (pen.), 72'; Demirbay 85'	Stadium: Schwarzwald-Stadion; Attendance: 23,900; Referee: Bibiana Steinhaus

2 February 2019 20	1899 Hoffenheim	1–1	Fortuna Düsseldorf	Sinsheim
15:30 CET (UTC+1)	Kramarić 16' (pen.)	Report	Hennings 46'	Stadium: PreZero Arena; Attendance: 24,747; Referee: Benjamin Cortus

9 February 2019 21	Borussia Dortmund	3–3	1899 Hoffenheim	Dortmund
15:30 CET (UTC+1)	Sancho 32'; Götze 43'; Guerreiro 66'	Report	Belfodil 75', 87'; Kadeřábek 83'	Stadium: Signal Iduna Park; Attendance: 81,365; Referee: Marco Fritz

16 February 2019 22	1899 Hoffenheim	3–0	Hannover 96	Sinsheim
15:30 CET (UTC+1)	Joelinton 4'; Belfodil 14'; Demirbay 80'	Report		Stadium: PreZero Arena; Attendance: 23,404; Referee: Daniel Siebert

25 February 2019 23	RB Leipzig	1–1	1899 Hoffenheim	Leipzig
20:30 CET (UTC+1)	Orbán 89'	Report	Kramarić 22'	Stadium: Red Bull Arena; Attendance: 33,569; Referee: Felix Brych

2 March 2019 24	Eintracht Frankfurt	3–2	1899 Hoffenheim	Frankfurt
15:30 CET (UTC+1)	Kostić 20'; Haller 89'; Paciência 90+6'	Report	Joelinton 43'; Belfodil 60'	Stadium: Commerzbank-Arena; Attendance: 49,500; Referee: Manuel Gräfe

10 March 2019 25	1899 Hoffenheim	2–1	1. FC Nürnberg	Sinsheim
15:30 CET (UTC+1)	Kramarić 25' (pen.), 78'	Report	Behrens 61'	Stadium: PreZero Arena; Attendance: 29,015; Referee: Christian Dingert

16 March 2019 26	VfB Stuttgart	1–1	1899 Hoffenheim	Stuttgart
15:30 CET (UTC+1)	Zuber 66'	Report	Kramarić 42'	Stadium: Mercedes-Benz Arena; Attendance: 56,743; Referee: Felix Zwayer

29 March 2019 27	1899 Hoffenheim	4–1	Bayer Leverkusen	Sinsheim
20:30 CET (UTC+1)	Belfodil 10', 61'; S. Bender 51' (o.g.); Kramarić 79'	Report	Volland 17'	Stadium: PreZero Arena; Attendance: 28,350; Referee: Harm Osmers

7 April 2019 28	FC Augsburg	0–4	1899 Hoffenheim	Augsburg
15:30 CEST (UTC+2)		Report	Kramarić 6'; Belfodil 61', 74', 82'	Stadium: WWK Arena; Attendance: 27,552; Referee: Robert Schröder

14 April 2019 29	1899 Hoffenheim	2–0	Hertha BSC	Sinsheim
13:30 CEST (UTC+2)	Amiri 29'; Nelson 76'	Report		Stadium: PreZero Arena; Attendance: 28,010; Referee: Martin Petersen

20 April 2019 30	Schalke 04	2–5	1899 Hoffenheim	Gelsenkirchen
20:30 CEST (UTC+2)	Caligiuri 60' (pen.); Burgstaller 90'	Report	Belfodil 25', 80'; Kramarić 45'; Szalai 65'; Amiri 73'	Stadium: Veltins-Arena; Attendance: 58,958; Referee: Christian Dingert

28 April 2019 31	1899 Hoffenheim	1–4	VfL Wolfsburg	Sinsheim
15:30 CEST (UTC+2)	Szalai 9'	Report	William 41'; Weghorst 69', 88'; Arnold 85'	Stadium: PreZero Arena; Attendance: 27,725; Referee: Deniz Aytekin

4 May 2019 32	Borussia Mönchengladbach	2–2	1899 Hoffenheim	Mönchengladbach
15:30 CEST (UTC+2)	Ginter 72'; Drmić 84'	Report	Kadeřábek 33'; Amiri 79'	Stadium: Borussia-Park; Attendance: 51,807; Referee: Sascha Stegemann

11 May 2019 33	1899 Hoffenheim	0–1	Werder Bremen	Sinsheim
15:30 CEST (UTC+2)		Report	J. Eggestein 39'	Stadium: PreZero Arena; Attendance: 30,150; Referee: Bastian Dankert

18 May 2019 34	Mainz 05	4–2	1899 Hoffenheim	Mainz
15:30 CEST (UTC+2)	Brosinski 66' (pen.); Boëtius 83', 90'; Mateta 90+3'	Report	Belfodil 12'; Kramarić 34'	Stadium: Opel Arena; Attendance: 28,305; Referee: Deniz Aytekin

=== DFB-Pokal ===
18 August 2018 First round	1. FC Kaiserslautern	1–6	1899 Hoffenheim	Kaiserslautern
15:30 CEST (UTC+2)	Spalvis 33'	Report	Joelinton 6', 22', 53'; Schulz 13'; Kadeřábek 51'; Brenet 63'	Stadium: Fritz-Walter-Stadion; Attendance: 22,818; Referee: Patrick Ittrich

31 October 2018 Second round	RB Leipzig	2–0	1899 Hoffenheim	Leipzig
20:45 CET (UTC+1)	Werner 48', 56'	Report		Stadium: Red Bull Arena; Attendance: 21,042; Referee: Marco Fritz

=== UEFA Champions League ===
==== Group stage ====
Pos	Team	Pld	W	D	L	GF	GA	GD	Pts	Qualification
1	(England) Manchester City	6	4	1	1	16	6	+10	13	Advance to knockout phase
2	(France) Lyon	6	1	5	0	12	11	+1	8	Advance to knockout phase
3	(Ukraine) Shakhtar Donetsk	6	1	3	2	8	16	−8	6	Transfer to Europa League
4	(Germany) TSG Hoffenheim	6	0	3	3	11	14	−3	3	

Source: UEFA
Rules for classification: Group stage tiebreakers

19 September 2018 1	Shakhtar Donetsk (Ukraine)	2–2	(Germany) 1899 Hoffenheim	Kharkiv, Ukraine
19:55 EEST (UTC+3); 18:55 CEST (UTC+2)	Ismaily 27'; Maycon 81'	Report	Grillitsch 6'; Nordtveit 38'	Stadium: Metalist Stadium; Attendance: 28,336; Referee: Jakob Kehlet (Denmark)

2 October 2018 2	1899 Hoffenheim (Germany)	1–2	(England) Manchester City	Sinsheim, Germany
18:55 CEST (UTC+2)	Belfodil 1'	Report	Agüero 8'; D. Silva 87'	Stadium: Wirsol Rhein-Neckar-Arena; Attendance: 24,851; Referee: Damir Skomina (Slovenia)

23 October 2018 3	1899 Hoffenheim (Germany)	3–3	(France) Lyon	Sinsheim, Germany
21:00 CEST (UTC+2)	Kramarić 33', 47'; Joelinton 90+2'	Report	Traoré 27'; Ndombele 59'; Depay 67'	Stadium: Wirsol Rhein-Neckar-Arena; Attendance: 24,144; Referee: Alberto Undiano Mallenco (Spain)

7 November 2018 4	Lyon (France)	2–2	(Germany) 1899 Hoffenheim	Décines-Charpieu, France
21:00 CET (UTC+1)	Fekir 19'; Ndombele 28'	Report	Kramarić 65'; Kadeřábek 90+2'	Stadium: Parc Olympique Lyonnais; Attendance: 53,850; Referee: Danny Makkelie (Netherlands)

27 November 2018 5	1899 Hoffenheim (Germany)	2–3	(Ukraine) Shakhtar Donetsk	Sinsheim, Germany
21:00 CET (UTC+1)	Kramarić 17'; Zuber 40'	Report	Ismaily 14'; Taison 15', 90+2'	Stadium: Wirsol Rhein-Neckar-Arena; Attendance: 22,920; Referee: Ivan Kružliak (Slovakia)

12 December 2018 6	Manchester City (England)	2–1	(Germany) 1899 Hoffenheim	Manchester, England
20:00 GMT (UTC±0); 21:00 CET (UTC+1)	Sané 45+1', 61'	Report	Kramarić 16' (pen.)	Stadium: City of Manchester Stadium; Attendance: 50,411; Referee: Andreas Ekberg (Sweden)

== Statistics ==
=== Appearances and goals ===
No.	Pos	Nat	Player	Total		Bundesliga		DFB-Pokal		Champions League	
No.	Pos	Nat	Player	Apps	Goals	Apps	Goals	Apps	Goals	Apps	Goals
Goalkeepers
1	GK	(Germany) GER	Oliver Baumann	39	0	33	0	0	0	6	0
12	GK	(Germany) GER	Philipp Pentke	0	0	0	0	0	0	0	0
33	GK	(Germany) GER	Alexander Stolz	0	0	0	0	0	0	0	0
Defenders
2	DF	(Netherlands) NED	Joshua Brenet	18	3	10+4	2	1+1	1	2	0
3	DF	(Czech Republic) CZE	Pavel Kadeřábek	36	5	28+1	3	1	1	6	1
4	DF	(Bosnia and Herzegovina) BIH	Ermin Bičakčić	30	1	20+5	1	2	0	3	0
15	DF	(Ghana) GHA	Kasim Nuhu	16	0	11+2	0	1	0	2	0
16	DF	(Germany) GER	Nico Schulz	37	2	29+1	1	2	1	5	0
21	DF	(Germany) GER	Benjamin Hübner	11	0	9+1	0	0	0	1	0
38	DF	(Austria) AUT	Stefan Posch	20	0	16+1	0	1	0	2	0
41	DF	(Germany) GER	Alfons Amade	1	0	0+1	0	0	0	0	0
Midfielders
7	MF	(Germany) GER	Lukas Rupp	1	0	0+1	0	0	0	0	0
8	MF	(Germany) GER	Dennis Geiger	5	0	2+2	0	0	0	1	0
10	MF	(Germany) GER	Kerem Demirbay	32	4	24+2	4	1	0	4+1	0
11	MF	(Austria) AUT	Florian Grillitsch	36	1	27+3	0	0	0	5+1	1
13	MF	(Germany) GER	Leonardo Bittencourt	26	1	13+8	1	2	0	2+1	0
18	MF	(Germany) GER	Nadiem Amiri	14	3	10+3	3	0	0	0+1	0
22	MF	(Germany) GER	Kevin Vogt	34	0	28	0	2	0	4	0
37	MF	(Germany) GER	Robin Hack	1	0	0	0	0	0	0+1	0
42	MF	(Austria) AUT	Christoph Baumgartner	2	0	1+1	0	0	0	0	0
Forwards
9	FW	(England) ENG	Reiss Nelson	29	7	5+18	7	0+1	0	0+5	0
19	FW	(Algeria) ALG	Ishak Belfodil	35	17	20+8	16	1+1	0	4+1	1
26	FW	(Germany) GER	David Otto	3	0	0+3	0	0	0	0	0
27	FW	(Croatia) CRO	Andrej Kramarić	37	22	28+2	17	1	0	5+1	5
28	FW	(Hungary) HUN	Ádám Szalai	37	6	15+15	6	2	0	4+1	0
34	FW	(Brazil) BRA	Joelinton	35	11	25+3	7	1+1	3	4+1	1
Players transferred out during the season
36	GK	(Switzerland) SUI	Gregor Kobel	3	0	1	0	2	0	0	0
24	DF	(Netherlands) NED	Justin Hoogma	4	0	1+1	0	0+1	0	1	0
25	DF	(Germany) GER	Kevin Akpoguma	10	0	5+3	0	0	0	2	0
6	MF	(Norway) NOR	Håvard Nordtveit	11	1	4+4	0	0	0	2+1	1
17	MF	(Switzerland) SUI	Steven Zuber	13	1	6+3	0	1	0	1+2	1
23	MF	(Brazil) BRA	Felipe Pires	0	0	0	0	0	0	0	0
32	MF	(Italy) ITA	Vincenzo Grifo	10	1	3+4	1	1+1	0	0+1	0

Last updated: 28 May 2019
Source: Competitions
