= Florian Grillitsch =

Austrian footballer (born 1995)

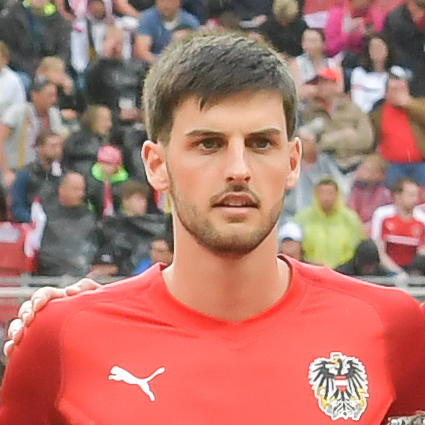
- Grillitsch with Austria in 2018

Personal information
- Date of birth: 7 August 1995 (age 31)
- Place of birth: Neunkirchen, Austria
- Height: 1.87 m (6 ft 2 in)
- Positions: Defensive midfielder; centre back

Team information
- Current team: Frosinone
- Number: 27

Youth career
- 2001–2008: SVSF Pottschach
- 2008–2013: St. Pölten
- 2013–2014: Werder Bremen

Senior career*
Years	Team	Apps	(Gls)
2013–2015	Werder Bremen II	36	(10)
2015–2017	Werder Bremen	48	(3)
2017–2022	TSG Hoffenheim	130	(3)
2022–2023	Ajax	10	(0)
2023–2025	TSG Hoffenheim	38	(1)
2025	→ Valladolid (loan)	13	(0)
2025–2026	Braga	20	(1)
2026–	Frosinone	1	(0)

International career^{‡}
2013–2014	Austria U19	8	(7)
2015	Austria U20	5	(2)
2014–2017	Austria U21	6	(3)
2017–	Austria	61	(1)
- * Club domestic league appearances and goals as of 29 September 2026 ‡ National team caps and goals as of 03:39, 27 October 2026 (UTC)

Florian Grillitsch (born 7 August 1995) is an Austrian professional footballer who plays as a defensive midfielder or centre back for Serie A side Frosinone and the Austria national team.

== Club career ==
=== Early career ===
Born in Neunkirchen, Austria on 7 August 1995, Grillitsch played for SVSF Pottschach and St. Pölten in his youth football career.

=== Werder Bremen ===
==== 2013–15 ====
Grillitsch joined Werder Bremen on 1 July 2013. He split the 2013–14 season between the Werder Bremen U19 team and Werder Bremen II. He made 15 appearances in the A-Junioren-Bundesliga Nord/Nordost scoring 11 goals and made five appearances in the Regionalliga Nord for Werder Bremen II. In the 2014–15 season, Grillitsch made 26 appearances scoring nine goals for Werder's reserve team.

==== 2015–16 season ====
Grillitsch made his first team debut during the 2015–16 season. He played the full 120 minutes including extra-time in the 2–0 win against Würzburger Kickers in the first round of the DFB-Pokal on 8 August 2015, notably assisting Anthony Ujah for 1–0. His first Bundesliga match was a 3–0 loss to Schalke 04 on matchday one on 15 August 2015. He replaced the veteran Clemens Fritz after 70 minutes at 2–0. He also played for Werder Bremen II during the 2015–16 season. Grillitsch achieved his first assist in the Bundesliga as Werder beat Mainz 3–1 on 24 October 2015 setting up Fin Bartels for the third goal. He played the full 90 minutes. Four days later, Grillitsch prominently featured in Werder's 1–0 second-round DFB-Pokal victory over 1. FC Köln, providing a major goal-scoring chance for Ujah, playing multiple through-balls and almost scoring. Afterwards, he was voted "Man of the match" by the club's fans.

==== 2016–17 season ====
On 18 March 2017, Grillitsch scored his second goal of the 2016–17 season in a 3–0 win against RB Leipzig, a match that saw all three of Werder Bremen's Austrian players score in the club's highest win of the season.

=== TSG Hoffenheim ===
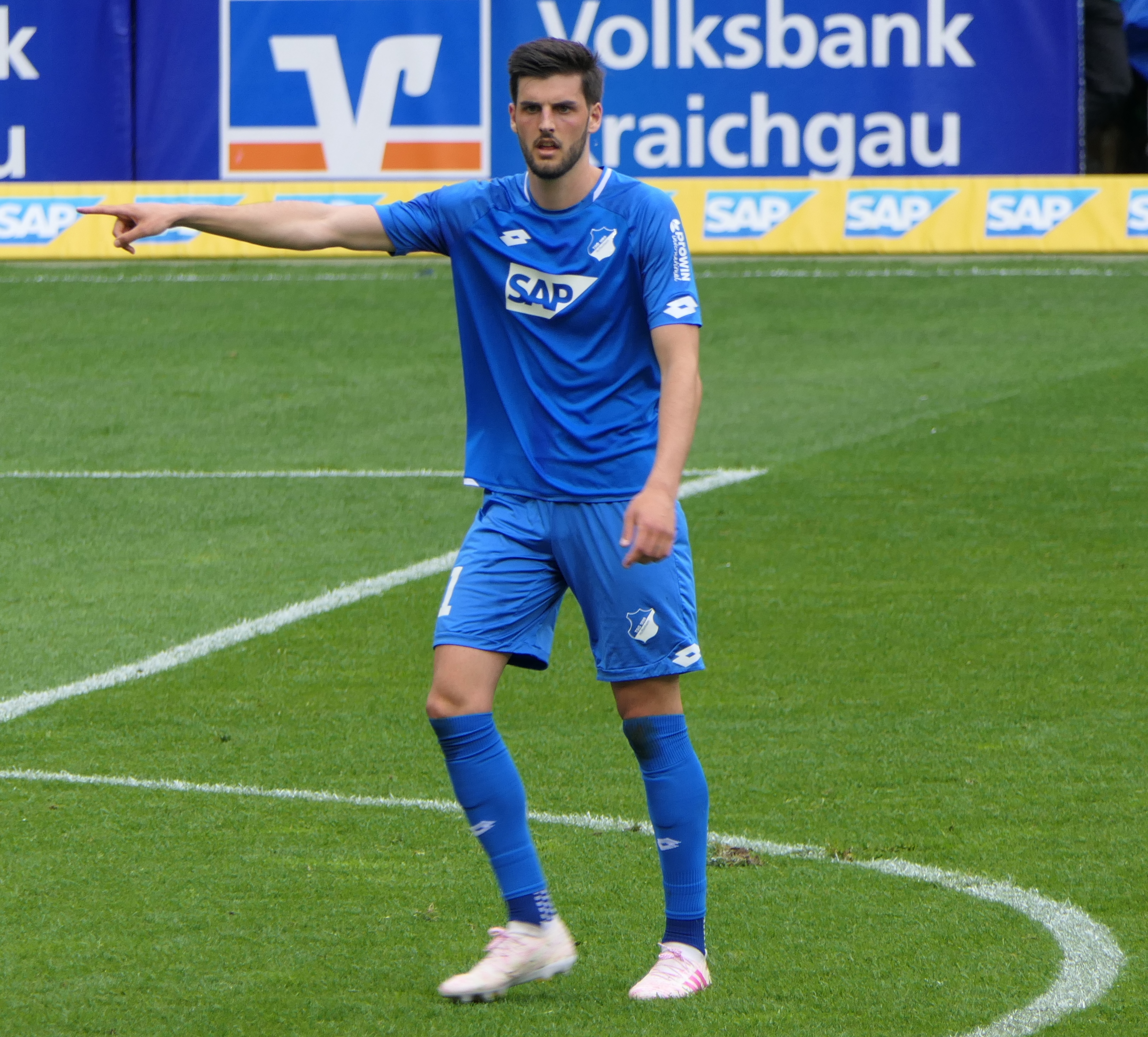
Grillitsch with Hoffenheim in May 2019

On 16 January 2017, Grillitsch signed a contract with TSG Hoffenheim until 2021, starting from the 2017–18 season.

He made his debut for the club in the league match against Bayer Leverkusen (1–1 draw) on August 26, 2017. Grillitsch scored his first goal for 1899 Hoffenheim on 2 November that year in the UEFA Europa League against Istanbul Başakşehir. However, Hoffenheim finished last in the group behind Istanbul Başakşehir, Braga and Ludogorets.

Things went better in the Bundesliga, with a fourth-place finish in 2017–18, and a group stage spot in the UEFA Champions League. The following seasons, Grillitsch finished eighth, seventh, eleventh and eighth again with Hoffenheim, in his five seasons at the club, where he clocked up 151 appearances with eight goals and eleven assists.

Grillitsch was a starter in the vast majority of those matches. But in the summer of 2022, Grillitsch let his contract expire with the club.

=== Ajax and TSG Hoffenheim return ===
After moving to then Dutch Eredivisie champions Ajax in September 2022, Grillitsch returned to TSG Hoffenheim after a year on a free transfer, signing a contract until 2026.

==== Loan to Valladolid ====
On 3 February 2025, Grillitsch was loaned to Spanish La Liga side Valladolid for the remainder of the 2024–25 season.

=== Braga ===
On 29 August 2025, Grillitsch signed a two-season contract with Braga in Portugal.

=== Frosinone ===
On 12 August 2026, Grillitsch signed a one-year contract with newly promoted Italian Serie A side Frosinone, with a club option to renew.

== International career ==
On 18 May 2026, Grillitsch was selected in Ralf Rangnick’s 26-man squad for the 2026 FIFA World Cup, marking Austria’s first appearance in the tournament since 1998.

== Career statistics ==
=== Club ===
As of match played 2 September 2026

Appearances and goals by club, season and competition
Club	Season	League			National cup (Note: Includes DFB-Pokal, KNVB Cup)		League cup		Europe		Total	
Club	Season	Division	Apps	Goals	Apps	Goals	Apps	Goals	Apps	Goals	Apps	Goals
Werder Bremen II	2013–14	Regionalliga Nord	5	0	—		—		—		5	0
Werder Bremen II	2014–15	Regionalliga Nord	26	9	—		—		—		26	9
Werder Bremen II	2015–16	3. Liga	5	1	—		—		—		5	1
Werder Bremen II	Total		36	10	—		—		—		36	10
Werder Bremen	2015–16	Bundesliga	25	1	5	1	—		—		30	2
Werder Bremen	2016–17	Bundesliga	23	2	1	0	—		—		24	2
Werder Bremen	Total		48	3	6	1	—		—		54	4
TSG Hoffenheim	2017–18	Bundesliga	25	1	1	0	—		3 (Note: Appearances in UEFA Europa League)	1	29	2
TSG Hoffenheim	2018–19	Bundesliga	30	0	0	0	—		6 (Note: Appearances in UEFA Champions League)	1	36	1
TSG Hoffenheim	2019–20	Bundesliga	31	0	3	1	—		—		34	1
TSG Hoffenheim	2020–21	Bundesliga	26	2	1	0	—		7	2	34	4
TSG Hoffenheim	2021–22	Bundesliga	18	0	0	0	—		—		18	0
TSG Hoffenheim	Total		130	3	5	1	—		16	4	151	8
Ajax	2022–23	Eredivisie	10	0	3	0	—		5	0	18	0
TSG Hoffenheim	2023–24	Bundesliga	29	1	1	0	—		—		30	1
TSG Hoffenheim	2024–25	Bundesliga	8	0	2	0	—		4	0	14	0
TSG Hoffenheim	Total		37	1	3	0	—		4	0	44	1
Valladolid (loan)	2024–25	La Liga	13	0	—		—		—		13	0
Braga	2025–26	Primeira Liga	20	1	3	0	3	0	10	2	36	3
Frosinone	2026–27	Serie A	1	0	1	0	0	0	0	0	2	0
Career total			296	18	21	2	3	0	35	6	354	26

=== International ===
As of match played 2 July 2026

Appearances and goals by national team and year
National team	Year	Apps	Goals
Austria	2017	6	0
Austria	2018	7	1
Austria	2019	3	0
Austria	2020	3	0
Austria	2021	14	0
Austria	2022	2	0
Austria	2023	5	0
Austria	2024	10	0
Austria	2025	7	0
Austria	2026	4	0
Total		61	1

As of match played 27 March 2018
Scores and results list Austria's goal tally first, score column indicates score after each Grillitsch goal.

List of international goals scored by Florian Grillitsch
No.	Date	Venue	Opponent	Score	Result	Competition
1	27 March 2018	Stade Josy Barthel, Luxembourg City, Luxembourg	Luxembourg	2–0	4–0	Friendly
