= 2025–26 TSG 1899 Hoffenheim season =

TSG 1899 Hoffenheim
2025–26 season
- Owner: Dietmar Hopp
- President: Jörg Albrecht
- Head coach: Christian Ilzer
- Stadium: Rhein-Neckar-Arena
- Bundesliga: 5th
- DFB-Pokal: Second round
- Top goalscorer: League: Andrej Kramarić (14); All: Andrej Kramarić (15)
- Average home league attendance: 26,697
Home colours	Away colours	Third colours

The 2025–26 season was the 127th season in the history of TSG 1899 Hoffenheim, and the club's 18th consecutive season in the Bundesliga. In addition to the domestic league, the club participated in the DFB-Pokal.

Hoffenheim finished 5th in the Bundesliga, and thus qualified for the 2026–27 UEFA Europa League; they were knocked out of the DFB-Pokal in the second round.

== Background and pre-season ==
In November 2024, Christian Ilzer was appointed as manager of the club on a "long-term contract", with the club narrowly above the relegation places. Despite an eventual 15th-place finish at the end of the 2024–25 season, and speculation suggesting Ilzer would be dismissed, Hoffenheim sporting director Andreas Schicker confirmed that he would remain head coach for the 2025–26 season.

== Competitions ==
=== Bundesliga ===
==== League table ====
Pos	Team	Pld	W	D	L	GF	GA	GD	Pts	Qualification or relegation
3	RB Leipzig	34	20	5	9	66	47	+19	65	Qualification for the Champions League league phase
4	VfB Stuttgart	34	18	8	8	71	49	+22	62	Qualification for the Champions League league phase
5	TSG Hoffenheim	34	18	7	9	65	52	+13	61	Qualification for the Europa League league phase (Note: The 2025–26 DFB-Pokal winners qualified for the Europa League league phase. Since the DFB-Pokal winners, Bayern Munich, qualified for the Champions League, the Europa League spot passed to the sixth-placed team, and the Conference League spot passed to the seventh-placed team.)
6	Bayer Leverkusen	34	17	8	9	68	47	+21	59	Qualification for the Europa League league phase
7	SC Freiburg	34	13	8	13	51	57	−6	47	Qualification for the Conference League play-off round

Source: Bundesliga
Rules for classification: 1) Points; 2) Goal difference; 3) Goals scored; 4) Head-to-head results; 5) Head-to-head away goals scored; 6) Away goals scored; 7) Play-off.
(Rules 4–6 only apply after home and away matches have been played between the tied teams.)

==== Match details ====
Bundesliga match details
Round	Date	Time	Opponent	Venue	Result F–A	Scorers	Attendance	League position	Ref.
1	23 August 2025	15:30	Bayer Leverkusen	Away	2–1	Asllani 25', Lemperle 52'	29,390	5th	
2	30 August 2025	15:30	Eintracht Frankfurt	Home	1–3	Prömel 90+1'	30,150	9th	
3	13 September 2025	15:30	Union Berlin	Away	4–2	Kramarić 45+1' pen., Asllani 45+3', 51', Lemperle 83' pen.	21,732	6th	
4	20 September 2025	15:30	Bayern Munich	Home	1–4	Coufal 82'	30,150	9th	
5	28 September 2025	15:30	SC Freiburg	Away	1–1	Asllani 13'	33,700	10th	
6	3 October 2025	20:30	1. FC Köln	Home	0–1		30,150	11th	
7	19 October 2025	17:30	FC St. Pauli	Away	3–0	Touré 54', Kramarić 59', Prömel 79'	29,248	8th	
8	25 October 2025	15:30	1. FC Heidenheim	Home	3–1	Asllani 18', Lemperle 45+2', Kramarić 63'	24,127	7th	
9	2 November 2025	17:30	VfL Wolfsburg	Away	3–2	Burger 31', 62', Prömel 50'	19,078	6th	
10	8 November 2025	15:30	RB Leipzig	Home	3–1	Hajdari 20', Lemperle 38', Prömel 79'	26,251	6th	
11	21 November 2025	20:30	Mainz 05	Away	1–1	Hanche-Olsen 9' o.g.	8,000	7th	
12	29 November 2025	15:30	FC Augsburg	Home	3–0	Touré 16', Burger 26', Zesiger 45' o.g.	20,218	5th	
13	7 December 2025	17:30	Borussia Dortmund	Away	0–2		81,365	5th	
14	13 December 2025	15:30	Hamburger SV	Home	4–1	Prömel 8', Kabak 31', Lemperle 65', Asllani 72'	30,150	5th	
15	20 December 2025	15:30	VfB Stuttgart	Away	0–0		59,000	5th	
17	14 January 2026	20:30	Borussia Mönchengladbach	Home	5–1	Kramarić 22' pen., 45+1', 45+4', Lemperle 24', Moerstedt 77'	20,750	5th	
18	17 January 2026	15:30	Bayer Leverkusen	Home	1–0	Burger 9'	26,957	3rd	
19	24 January 2026	15:30	Eintracht Frankfurt	Away	3–1	Moerstedt 52', Kabak 60', Amenda 65' o.g.	58,500	3rd	
16	27 January 2026	20:30	Werder Bremen	Away	2–0	Prass 44', Prömel 54'	39,500	3rd	
20	31 January 2026	15:30	Union Berlin	Home	3–1	Kramarić 42' pen., 45', Leite 47' o.g.	19,341	3rd	
21	8 February 2026	17:30	Bayern Munich	Away	1–5	Kramarić 35'	75,000	3rd	
22	14 February 2026	15:30	SC Freiburg	Home	3–0	Asllani 46', Kabak 51', Gendrey 90+5'	22,679	3rd	
23	21 February 2026	15:30	1. FC Köln	Away	2–2	Kabak 45', Kramarić 60'	49,600	3rd	
24	28 February 2026	15:30	FC St. Pauli	Home	0–1		27,786	3rd	
25	7 March 2026	15:30	1. FC Heidenheim	Away	4–2	Prass 26', 45+1', Asllani 49', Lemperle 78'	15,000	3rd	
26	14 March 2026	15:30	VfL Wolfsburg	Home	1–1	Prömel 83'	26,252	3rd	
27	20 March 2026	20:30	RB Leipzig	Away	0–5		40,980	5th	
28	4 April 2026	15:30	Mainz 05	Home	1–2	Asllani 23'	30,150	5th	
29	10 April 2026	20:30	FC Augsburg	Away	2–2	Hranáč 35', Touré 42'	28,600	6th	
30	18 April 2026	15:30	Borussia Dortmund	Home	2–1	Kramarić 42' pen., 90+8' pen.	30,150	5th	
31	25 April 2026	18:30	Hamburger SV	Away	2–1	Asllani 18', Lemperle 45'	57,000	5th	
32	2 May 2026	15:30	VfB Stuttgart	Home	3–3	Kramarić 7', 49', Touré 24'	30,150	6th	
33	9 May 2026	15:30	Werder Bremen	Home	1–0	Touré 26'	28,128	5th	
34	16 May 2026	15:30	Borussia Mönchengladbach	Away	0–4		53,033	5th	

=== DFB-Pokal ===
DFB-Pokal match details
Round	Date	Time	Opponent	Venue	Result F–A	Scorers	Attendance	Ref.
First round	16 August 2025	15:30	Hansa Rostock	Away	4–0	Burger 37', Moerstedt 71', 86', Asllani 83'	22,264	
Second round	28 October 2025	20:45	FC St. Pauli	Away	2–2 (a.e.t.) (7–8 p)	Prömel 47', Kramarić 107' pen.	28,123	
