= Max Moerstedt =

German footballer (born 2006)

Personal information
- Date of birth: 15 January 2006 (age 20)
- Place of birth: Mannheim, Germany
- Height: 1.95 m (6 ft 5 in)
- Position: Striker

Team information
- Current team: TSG Hoffenheim
- Number: 9

Youth career
- –2015: SG Oftersheim
- 2015–2020: Karlsruher SC
- 2020: Bayern Munich
- 2021–2024: TSG Hoffenheim

Senior career*
Years	Team	Apps	(Gls)
2024–	TSG Hoffenheim	39	(3)
2024–	TSG Hoffenheim II	7	(2)

International career^{‡}
2021–2022	Germany U16	4	(2)
2022–2023	Germany U17	23	(10)
2024	Germany U18	2	(0)
2024–2025	Germany U19	13	(6)
2025–2026	Germany U20	9	(8)
2025–	Germany U21	2	(1)
Medal record
Men's football
Representing Germany
FIFA U-17 World Cup
Winner	2023 Indonesia
UEFA European Under-17 Championship
Winner	2023 Hungary
- * Club domestic league appearances and goals as of 17:26, 25 October 2026 (UTC) ‡ National team caps and goals as of 20:35, 17 November 2026 (UTC)

Max Moerstedt (German pronunciation: [maks ˈmøːɐ̯ʃtɛt]; born 15 January 2006) is a German professional footballer who plays as a striker for Bundesliga club TSG Hoffenheim.

== Club career ==
Native of Mannheim, Moerstedt joined the youth academy of German Bundesliga side TSG Hoffenheim at the age of fifteen. He was regarded as one of the club's most important players.

On 3 May 2024, he made his senior Bundesliga debut as a substitute in a 1–1 draw against RB Leipzig. Later that year, on 25 September, he scored his first goal for Hoffenheim in a 1–1 away draw against FC Midtjylland during the Europa League.

== International career ==
Moerstedt has represented Germany internationally at youth level. He played for the Germany national under-17 football team at the 2023 FIFA U-17 World Cup.

In May 2025, he was named in the Germany U19 squad for 2025 UEFA European Under-19 Championship. In the tournament's semi-final against Spain U19, he scored a hat-trick in a thrilling 6–5 loss after extra time.

== Career statistics ==
As of match played 25 October 2026

Appearances and goals by club, season and competition
Club	Season	League			Cup		Europe		Other		Total	
Club	Season	Division	Apps	Goals	Apps	Goals	Apps	Goals	Apps	Goals	Apps	Goals
TSG Hoffenheim	2023–24	Bundesliga	1	0	—		—		—		1	0
TSG Hoffenheim	2024–25	Bundesliga	12	0	2	0	7 (Note: Appearances in UEFA Europa League)	1	—		21	1
TSG Hoffenheim	2025–26	Bundesliga	22	2	1	2	—		—		23	4
TSG Hoffenheim	2026–27	Bundesliga	4	1	1	1	0	0	—		5	2
TSG Hoffenheim	Total		39	3	4	3	7	1	—		50	7
TSG Hoffenheim II	2024–25	Regionalliga Südwest	7	2	—		—		—		7	2
Career total			46	5	4	3	7	1	0	0	57	9

== Style of play ==
Moerstedt mainly operates as a striker. He is known for his height and heading ability.

== Honours ==
Germany U17

- FIFA U-17 World Cup: 2023
- UEFA European Under-17 Championship: 2023

Individual

- UEFA European Under-19 Championship top scorer: 2025
- UEFA European Under-19 Championship Team of the Tournament: 2025
- Fritz Walter Medal U19 Bronze: 2025
