= Valentin Gendrey =

French footballer (born 2000)

Personal information
- Full name: Valentin André Stanislas Gendrey
- Date of birth: 21 June 2000 (age 26)
- Place of birth: La Garenne-Colombes, France
- Height: 1.79 m (5 ft 10 in)
- Position: Right-back

Team information
- Current team: TSG Hoffenheim
- Number: 15

Youth career
- 2006–2007: Tillé
- 2007–2010: Guignecourt
- 2010–2015: Beauvais
- 2015: Chantilly
- 2015–2017: Amiens

Senior career*
Years	Team	Apps	(Gls)
2017–2021	Amiens II	37	(1)
2020–2021	Amiens	21	(0)
2021–2024	Lecce	105	(2)
2024–	TSG Hoffenheim	32	(2)

International career^{‡}
2018	France U18	4	(0)
2023	France U21	3	(0)
- * Club domestic league appearances and goals as of 10 October 2026 ‡ National team caps and goals as of 2 July 2023

Valentin André Stanislas Gendrey (born 21 June 2000) is a French professional footballer who plays as a right-back for German Bundesliga club TSG Hoffenheim.

== Club career ==
Gendrey made his professional debut with Amiens in a 1–0 Ligue 2 win over AS Nancy on 22 August 2020.

On 29 July 2021, he joined Lecce.

On 27 August 2024, Gendrey signed with TSG Hoffenheim in Germany.

== Personal life ==
Gendrey is of Guadeloupean descent and a distant cousin of the former French international footballer Olivier Dacourt.

== Career statistics ==
As of match played 28 October 2026

Appearances and goals by club, season and competition
Club	Season	League			National cup		Europe		Other		Total	
Club	Season	Division	Apps	Goals	Apps	Goals	Apps	Goals	Apps	Goals	Apps	Goals
Amiens II	2017–18	CFA 2	4	1	—		—		—		4	1
Amiens II	2018–19	CFA 2	23	0	—		—		—		23	0
Amiens II	2019–20	CFA 2	10	0	—		—		—		10	0
Amiens II	Total		37	1	—		—		—		37	1
Amiens	2020–21	Ligue 2	20	0	1	0	—		—		21	0
Amiens	2021–22	Ligue 2	1	0	—		—		—		1	0
Amiens	Total		21	0	1	0	—		—		22	0
Lecce	2021–22	Serie B	29	0	3	0	—		—		32	0
Lecce	2022–23	Serie B	37	0	1	0	—		—		38	0
Lecce	2023–24	Serie B	37	2	1	0	—		—		38	2
Lecce	2024–25	Serie A	2	0	1	0	—		—		3	0
Lecce	Total		105	2	6	0	—		—		111	2
TSG Hoffenheim	2024–25	Bundesliga	22	1	1	0	5 (Note: Appearances in UEFA Europa League)	1	—		28	2
TSG Hoffenheim	2025–26	Bundesliga	8	1	0	0	—		—		8	1
TSG Hoffenheim	2026–27	Bundesliga	2	0	2	0	1	0	—		5	0
TSG Hoffenheim	Total		32	2	3	0	6	1	—		41	3
Career total			195	5	10	0	6	1	0	0	211	6
