= Fisnik Asllani =

Kosovan footballer (born 2002)

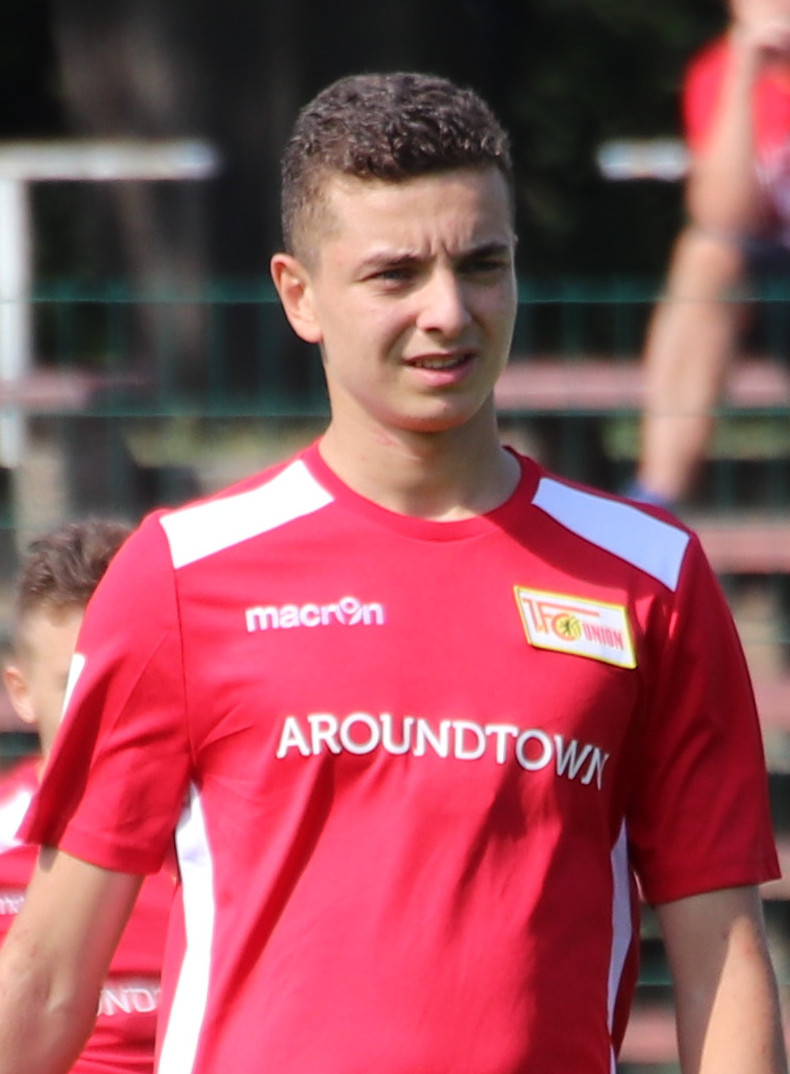
- Asllani with Union Berlin in 2019

Personal information
- Date of birth: 8 August 2002 (age 24)
- Place of birth: Berlin, Germany
- Height: 1.91 m (6 ft 3 in)
- Position: Forward

Team information
- Current team: TSG Hoffenheim
- Number: 11

Youth career
- 2008–2016: BFC Dynamo
- 2016–2020: Union Berlin

Senior career*
Years	Team	Apps	(Gls)
2020–2023	TSG Hoffenheim II	53	(17)
2021–	TSG Hoffenheim	49	(10)
2023–2024	→ Austria Wien (loan)	16	(4)
2024–2025	→ SV Elversberg (loan)	33	(18)

International career^{‡}
2019	Kosovo U17	3	(0)
2019	Germany U18	2	(1)
2022–2023	Germany U20	7	(3)
2024–	Kosovo	22	(5)
- * Club domestic league appearances and goals as of 31 October 2026 ‡ National team caps and goals as of 16:10, 18 November 2026 (UTC)

Fisnik Asllani (born 8 August 2002) is a professional footballer who plays as a forward for German Bundesliga club TSG Hoffenheim. A former international for Kosovo U17, he played for the Germany national youth teams in a pair of friendlies before switching back to play for the Kosovo national team.

== Club career ==
=== Early career / TSG Hoffenheim ===
Asllani at the age of six began playing football with the academy of BFC Dynamo in 2008, where after eight years it was transferred to Union Berlin.

On 29 June 2020, Asllani signed his first professional contract with TSG Hoffenheim after agreeing to a four-year deal. On 15 December 2020, he made his debut with second team in a 2–0 home win against Eintracht Stadtallendorf after coming on as a substitute in the 59th minute in place of Maximilian Beier. His senior debut with 1899 Hoffenheim came on 20 November 2021, in a league match against RB Leipzig after coming on as a substitute in the 89th minute in place of Ihlas Bebou.

==== Loan at Austria Wien ====
On 31 August 2023, Asllani joined Austrian Bundesliga side Austria Wien, on a season-long loan. His debut with Austria Wien came three days later in a 2–2 home draw against Austria Klagenfurt after being named in the starting line-up. On 7 October 2023, he scored his first goal for Austria Wien in his fifth appearance for the club in a 4–0 home win over Blau-Weiß Linz in Austrian Bundesliga.

==== Loan at SV Elversberg ====
On 23 July 2024, Asllani joined German 2. Bundesliga side SV Elversberg, on a season-long loan.

== International career ==
=== Kosovo ===
On 20 March 2019, Asllani was named as part of the Kosovo U17 squad for 2019 UEFA European Under-17 Championship elite round. Five days later, he made his debut with Kosovo U17 in a match against Ukraine U17 after being named in the starting line-up.

On 15 October 2019, Asllani was included in Kosovo U19's extended squad for 2020 UEFA European Under-19 Championship qualifications. He was, however, not included into the final squad.

=== Germany ===
On 7 December 2019, Asllani was named as part of the Germany U18 squad for a winter tournament in Israel. His debut with Germany U18 came three days later in the match against Serbia U18 after being named in the starting line-up and scored his side's only goal during a 1–2 away defeat. He also played for Germany U20 with whom he played seven matches and scored three goals.

=== Return to Kosovo ===
In June 2023, Asllani visited the Kosovo national team before the UEFA Euro 2024 qualifying matches against Romania and Belarus, which seemed like a kind of signal to return to represent Kosovo at the international level. On 24 December 2023, The Football Federation of Kosovo during the "2023 Laureates" event presented the return of Asllani to the Kosovo national team. On 30 August 2024, Asllani received a call-up from Kosovo for the 2024–25 UEFA Nations League matches against Romania and Cyprus. His debut with Kosovo came seven days later in the 2024–25 UEFA Nations League match against Romania after being named in the starting line-up. On 9 June 2025 he scored his first international goal in a friendly against Comoros. On 13 October 2025 he scored the winner against Sweden in Gothenburg in the 2026 FIFA World Cup Qualification.

== Personal life ==
Asllani was born in Berlin, Germany to Albanian parents from the village Sharban of Pristina, Kosovo.

== Career statistics ==
=== Club ===
As of match played 31 October 2026

Appearances and goals by club, season and competition
Club	Season	League			National cup (Note: Includes DFB-Pokal, Austrian Cup)		Europe		Other		Total	
Club	Season	Division	Apps	Goals	Apps	Goals	Apps	Goals	Apps	Goals	Apps	Goals
TSG Hoffenheim II	2020–21	Regionalliga Südwest	24	2	0	0	—		—		24	2
TSG Hoffenheim II	2021–22	Regionalliga Südwest	6	1	0	0	—		—		6	1
TSG Hoffenheim II	2022–23	Regionalliga Südwest	22	14	0	0	—		—		22	14
TSG Hoffenheim II	2023–24	Regionalliga Südwest	1	0	0	0	—		—		1	0
TSG Hoffenheim II	Total		53	17	0	0	—		—		53	17
TSG Hoffenheim	2021–22	Bundesliga	2	0	0	0	—		—		2	0
TSG Hoffenheim	2022–23	Bundesliga	8	0	0	0	—		—		8	0
TSG Hoffenheim	2025–26	Bundesliga	33	10	2	1	—		—		35	11
TSG Hoffenheim	2026–27	Bundesliga	6	0	1	0	3 (Note: Appearances in UEFA Europa League)	1	—		10	1
TSG Hoffenheim	Total		49	10	3	1	3	1	—		55	12
Austria Wien (loan)	2023–24	Austrian Bundesliga	16	4	2	1	—		3 (Note: Appearance in Austrian Bundesliga European play-offs)	0	21	5
SV Elversberg (loan)	2024–25	2. Bundesliga	33	18	2	0	—		2 (Note: Appearances in Bundesliga promotion play-offs)	1	37	19
Career total			151	49	7	2	3	1	5	1	166	53

=== International ===
As of match played 17 November 2026

Appearances and goals by national team and year
National team	Year	Apps	Goals
Kosovo	2024	5	0
Kosovo	2025	7	3
Kosovo	2026	10	2
Total		22	5

Scores and results list Kosovo's goal tally first, score column indicates score after each Asllani goal.

List of international goals scored by Fisnik Asllani
No.	Date	Venue	Opponent	Score	Result	Competition
1	9 June 2025	Fadil Vokrri Stadium, Pristina, Kosovo	Comoros	4–2	4–2	Friendly
2	13 October 2025	Ullevi, Gothenburg, Sweden	Sweden	1–0	1–0	2026 FIFA World Cup qualification
3	15 November 2025	Stožice Stadium, Ljubljana, Slovenia	Slovenia	1–0	2–0	2026 FIFA World Cup qualification
4	26 March 2026	Tehelné pole, Bratislava, Slovakia	Slovakia	2–2	4–3	2026 FIFA World Cup qualification
5	4 October 2026	Fadil Vokrri Stadium, Pristina, Kosovo	Austria	1–0	1–1	2026–27 UEFA Nations League B
