= Puch bei Weiz =

- Municipality
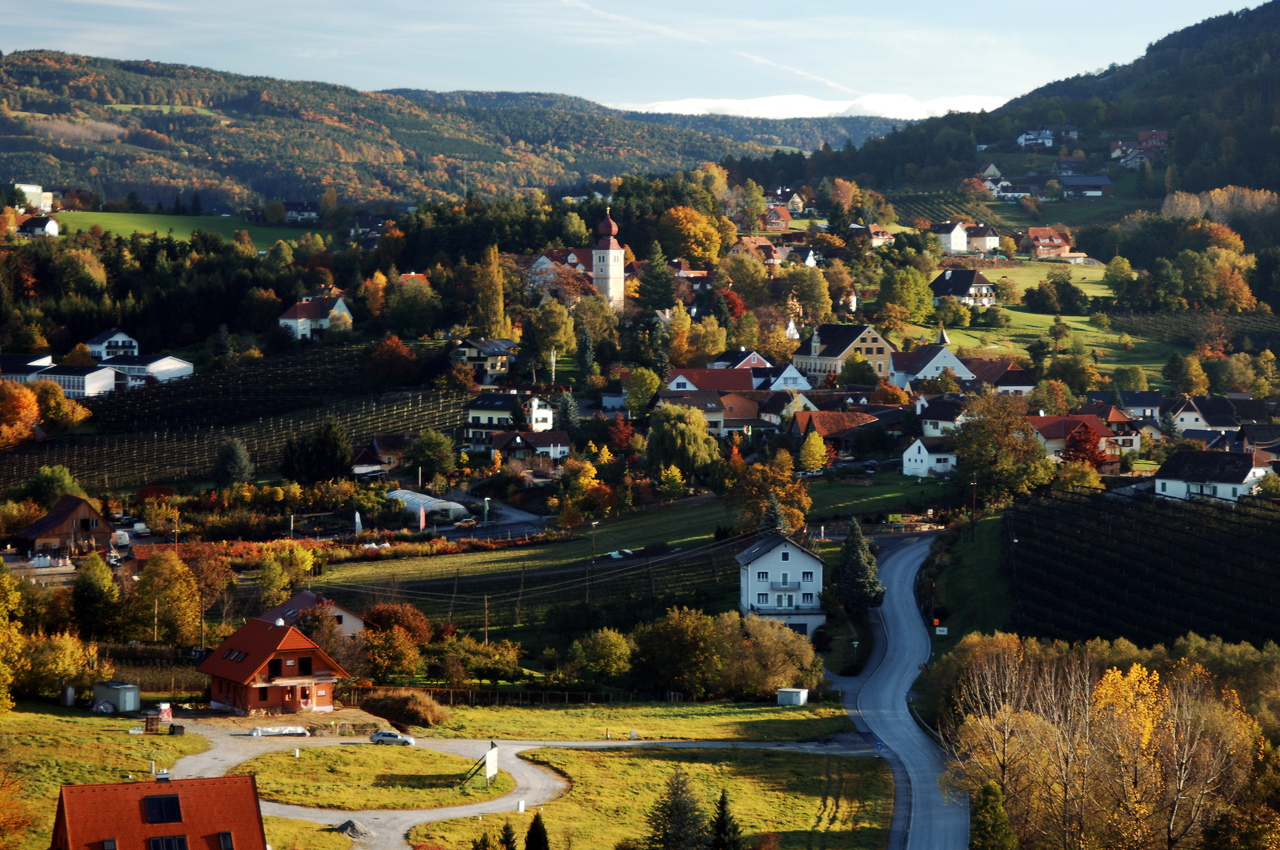

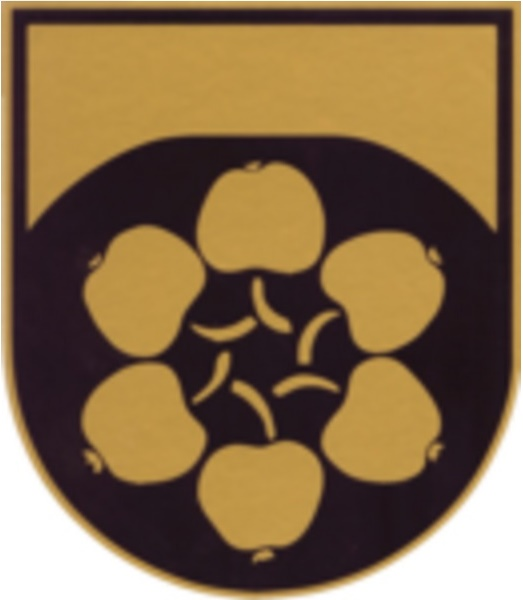
- Coat of arms

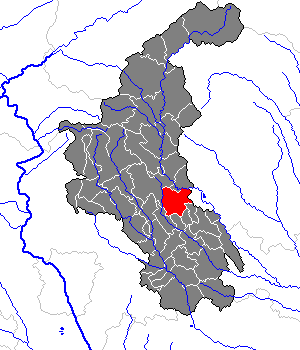
- Location within Weiz district

- Location within Austria
- Coordinates: 47°14′00″N 15°43′00″E
- Country: Austria
- State: Styria
- District: Weiz

Government
  - Mayor: Johann Zöhrer (ÖVP)

Area
  - Total: 24.85 km^{2} (9.59 sq mi)
- Elevation: 449 m (1,473 ft)

Population (2018-01-01)
  - Total: 2,091
  - Density: 84.14/km^{2} (217.9/sq mi)
- Time zone: UTC+1 (CET)
  - Summer (DST): UTC+2 (CEST)
- Postal code: 8182
- Area code: 03177
- Vehicle registration: WZ
- Website: www.puch-weiz.steiermark.at

Puch bei Weiz is a municipality in the district of Weiz in the Austrian state of Styria.

== Geography ==
Puch lies about 25 km (16 mi) east of Graz and 10 km (6.2 mi) east of Weiz.
