= Christian Ilzer =

Austrian football manager (born 1977)

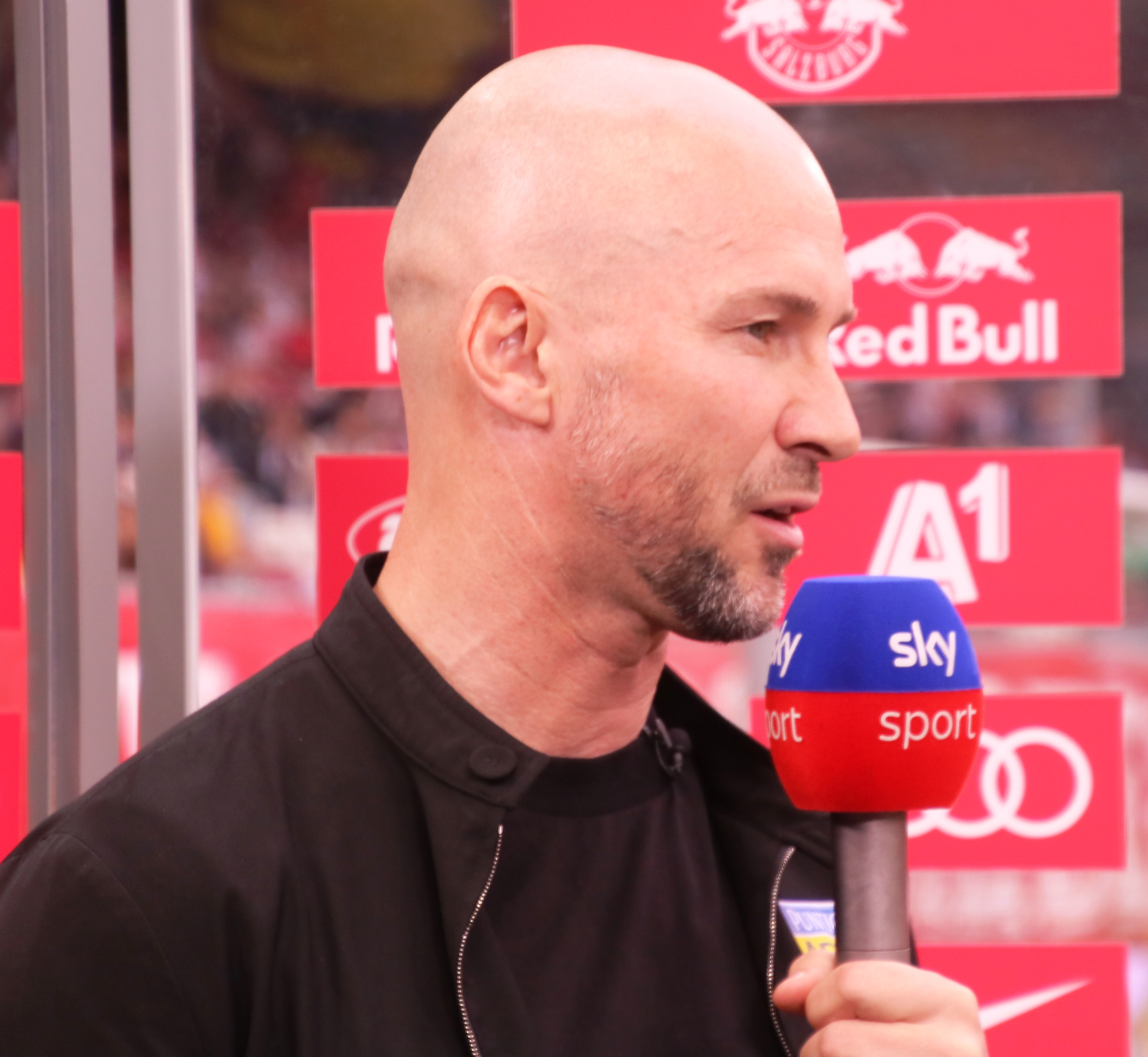
- Ilzer in 2024 as Sturm Graz manager

Personal information
- Date of birth: 21 October 1977 (age 49)
- Place of birth: Puch bei Weiz, Austria
- Height: 1.84 m (6 ft 0 in)
- Position: Midfielder

Team information
- Current team: TSG Hoffenheim (manager)

Youth career
- 1986–1998: USK Raiffeisen Puch
- 1998–1999: SV Ada Anger
- 2001–2004: USK Raiffeisen Puch
- 2004–2006: SC Weiz

Senior career*
Years	Team	Apps	(Gls)
2006–2007	USK Raiffeisen Puch		

Managerial career
- 2006–2007: USK Raiffeisen Puch (player-manager)
- 2012–2013: SC Weiz
- 2014: Wiener Neustadt (caretaker)
- 2015: TSV Hartberg
- 2017–2018: TSV Hartberg
- 2018–2019: Wolfsberger AC
- 2019–2020: Austria Wien
- 2020–2024: Sturm Graz
- 2024–: TSG Hoffenheim
- * Club domestic league appearances and goals

Christian Ilzer (born 21 October 1977) is an Austrian professional football coach who is the manager of Bundesliga club TSG Hoffenheim.

== Coaching career ==
=== Early career ===
As a teenager, three cruciate ligament injuries stopped his career and at the age of only 17, where became coach of USK Raiffeisen Puch's U17 squad. In addition to his job as an electronics technician, he started a second education as a trainer. From 2006 to 2007, he was in charge of the first team of USK Raiffeisen Puch as a playing manager. From July 2007 to July 2011, he was assistant manager under manager Bruno Friesenbichler at TSV Hartberg.

In September 2011, he worked with the Austrian U19 national team as a fitness coach, while he in the 2012–13 season also was the manager of SC Weiz. From the summer 2013, once again he became assistant manager under manager Bruno Friesenbichler at TSV Hartberg. After one season at TSV Hartberg, he joined Wiener Neustadt as assistant manager. On 12 November 2014, Heimo Pfeifenberger was fired at Neustadt and Ilzer took over as caretaker manager. Ilzer was in charge for one game which he won 2–0 against Wolfsberger AC, before Helgi Kolviðsson was appointed as manager on 23 November 2014. Ilzer continued his role as assistant manager at the club, before he left at the end of the season and then became manager of TSV Hartberg. He left his position already on 25 November 2015, to become an assistant manager at Wolfsberger under Heimo Pfeifenberger.

=== TSV Hartberg ===
In May 2017, Ilzer returned to TSV Hartberg as head coach. In the 2017–18 season, he guided the club to finish second in the second division, securing promotion to the Austrian Bundesliga for the first time in their history.

=== Wolfsberger ===
In May 2018, it was announced that Ilzer would rejoin Wolfsberger as head coach for the 2018–19 season. He led the club to qualify to the Europa League group stage for first time in their history, after finishing third in the Austrian Bundesliga.

=== Austria Wien ===
On 29 May 2019, Ilzer was appointed manager of Austria Wien for the 2019–20 season. After a seventh-place finish in the league, his team lost the Europa League play-offs 3–2 on aggregate against his former club TSV Hartberg.

=== Sturm Graz ===
On 17 July 2020, he was hired as manager of Sturm Graz. He guided the club to a runner-up finish in both 2021–22 and 2022–23, where he achieved the VdF-Fußballerwahl Coach of the Season award for the latter. He won his first title at the club by clinching the 2022–23 Austrian Cup after a 2–0 win against Rapid Wien in the final.

In the 2023–24 season, he led the club to their fourth league title in history after a 2–0 win over Austria Klagenfurt on the final matchday, ending Red Bull Salzburg's decade-long dominance, in addition to securing a UEFA Champions League group stage berth for the first time since 2000–01. Furthermore, he succeeded in steering the club to their first domestic double since the 1998–99 season, having achieved the 2023–24 Austrian Cup following a 2–1 victory over Rapid Wien in the final.

=== TSG Hoffenheim ===
He was appointed by TSG Hoffenheim in November 2024.

== Managerial statistics ==
As of match played 21 November 2026

Managerial record by team and tenure
Team	From	To	Record							
Team	From	To	G	W	D	L	GF	GA	GD	Win %
SC Weiz	1 July 2012	8 June 2013	30	19	3	8	60	33	+27	63.33
Wiener Neustadt (caretaker)	12 November 2014	23 November 2014	1	1	0	0	2	0	+2	100.00
TSV Hartberg	5 June 2015	25 November 2015	17	12	2	3	40	24	+16	70.59
TSV Hartberg	1 July 2017	1 June 2018	40	22	9	9	76	41	+35	55.00
Wolfsberger AC	1 June 2018	29 May 2019	35	14	10	11	53	51	+2	40.00
Austria Wien	29 May 2019	17 July 2020	39	14	12	13	65	60	+5	35.90
Sturm Graz	17 July 2020	15 November 2024	196	106	41	49	348	223	+125	54.08
TSG Hoffenheim	15 November 2024	Present	81	31	19	31	137	140	−3	38.27
Total			439	219	96	124	781	572	+209	49.89

== Honours ==
Sturm Graz

- Austrian Bundesliga: 2023–24
- Austrian Cup: 2022–23, 2023–24

Individual

- VdF-Fußballerwahl Coach of the Season: 2023
