= Hellmonsödt =

- Municipality
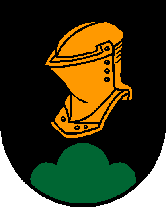
- Coat of arms

- Location within Austria
- Coordinates: 48°25′57″N 14°18′01″E
- Country: Austria
- State: Upper Austria
- District: Urfahr-Umgebung

Government
  - Mayor: Anton Schwarz (ÖVP)

Area
  - Total: 18.08 km^{2} (6.98 sq mi)
- Elevation: 825 m (2,707 ft)

Population (2018-01-01)
  - Total: 2,303
  - Density: 127.4/km^{2} (329.9/sq mi)
- Time zone: UTC+1 (CET)
  - Summer (DST): UTC+2 (CEST)
- Postal code: 4202
- Area code: 0 72 15
- Vehicle registration: UU
- Website: www.hellmonsoedt.at

Hellmonsödt is a municipality in the district of Urfahr-Umgebung in the Austrian state of Upper Austria.

== Population ==
Historical population
Year	Pop.	±%
1991	1,804	—
2001	2,082	+15.4%
2010	2,136	+2.6%
