= 2019–20 DFB-Pokal =

77th season of the annual German football cup competition

Tournament details
- Country: Germany
- Venue(s): Olympiastadion, Berlin
- Dates: 9 August 2019 – 4 July 2020
- Teams: 64

Final positions
- Champions: Bayern Munich (20th title)
- Runners-up: Bayer Leverkusen
- Europa League: 1899 Hoffenheim (Note: Since the winners of the DFB-Pokal, Bayern Munich, qualified for the Champions League based on their league position, the Europa League group stage spot awarded to the DFB-Pokal winner was passed to the sixth-placed team in the Bundesliga, 1899 Hoffenheim.)

Tournament statistics
- Matches played: 63
- Goals scored: 245 (3.89 per match)
- Attendance: 1,321,688 (20,979 per match)
- Top goal scorer: Robert Lewandowski (6 goals)
- Goals scored in penalty shoot-outs not included.

The 2019–20 DFB-Pokal was the 77th season of the annual German football cup competition. Sixty-four teams participated in the competition, including all teams from the previous year's Bundesliga and 2. Bundesliga. The competition began on 9 August 2019 with the first of six rounds and ended on 4 July 2020 with the final at the Olympiastadion in Berlin, a nominally neutral venue, which has hosted the final since 1985. The DFB-Pokal is considered the second-most important club title in German football after the Bundesliga championship. The DFB-Pokal is run by the German Football Association (DFB).

The defending champions were Bundesliga side Bayern Munich, after they defeated RB Leipzig 3–0 in the previous final.

Bayern successfully defended their title, winning their 20th DFB-Pokal title after beating Bayer Leverkusen 4–2 in the final. With the win, Bayern completed their second consecutive and 13th domestic double overall, and therefore played at home (in a change of format; under old rules they would have played away as was the case the previous year) to 2019–20 Bundesliga runners-up Borussia Dortmund in the 2020 DFL-Supercup. Because Bayern qualified for the Champions League through the Bundesliga, the sixth-place team in the Bundesliga, 1899 Hoffenheim, earned qualification for the group stage of the 2020–21 edition of the UEFA Europa League, and the league's second round spot went to the team in seventh, VfL Wolfsburg.

== Effects of the COVID-19 pandemic ==
On 27 March 2020, the German Football Association (DFB) indefinitely postponed the semi-finals of the competition, originally scheduled for 21 and 22 April, due to the COVID-19 pandemic in Germany. On 24 April, the DFB also indefinitely postponed the final of the competition, originally scheduled for 23 May, with the goal of completing the competition by 30 June 2020. On 11 May 2020, the DFB Executive Committee approved a resumption of the competition, subject to political approval, using a hygiene concept similar to that implemented by the DFL in the Bundesliga and 2. Bundesliga. The semi-finals took place on 9 and 10 June, while the final took place on 4 July 2020. However, the remaining matches were required to be played behind closed doors without any spectators. In addition, five substitutions were permitted for the remaining matches following a proposal from FIFA and approval by IFAB, meant to lessen the impact of fixture congestion.

== Participating clubs ==
The following 64 teams qualified for the competition:

Bundesliga the 18 clubs of the 2018–19 season	2. Bundesliga; the 18 clubs of the 2018–19 season	3. Liga; the top 4 clubs of the 2018–19 season
FC Augsburg; Hertha BSC; Werder Bremen; Borussia Dortmund; Fortuna Düsseldorf; Eintracht Frankfurt; SC Freiburg; Hannover 96; 1899 Hoffenheim; RB Leipzig; Bayer Leverkusen; Mainz 05; Borussia Mönchengladbach; Bayern Munich; 1. FC Nürnberg; Schalke 04; VfB Stuttgart; VfL Wolfsburg	Erzgebirge Aue; Union Berlin; Arminia Bielefeld; VfL Bochum; Darmstadt 98; Dynamo Dresden; MSV Duisburg; Greuther Fürth; Hamburger SV; 1. FC Heidenheim; FC Ingolstadt; Holstein Kiel; 1. FC Köln; 1. FC Magdeburg; SC Paderborn; Jahn Regensburg; SV Sandhausen; FC St. Pauli	Hallescher FC; Karlsruher SC; VfL Osnabrück; Wehen Wiesbaden
Representatives of the regional associations 24 representatives of 21 regional associations of the DFB, qualified (in general) through the 2018–19 Verbandspokal (Note: The three regions with the most participating teams in their league competitions (Bavaria, Lower Saxony, and Westphalia) were allowed to enter two teams for the competition.)
Baden: Waldhof Mannheim (Note: Waldhof Mannheim qualified regardless of the outcome of the final of the Baden Cup, as Karlsruher SC, the other finalists, already qualified for the DFB-Pokal through their 3. Liga position.); Bavaria (Note: In addition to the Bavarian Cup winners, the best-placed amateur team of the Regionalliga Bayern also qualified.): Würzburger Kickers (CW); VfB Eichstätt (RB) (Note: VfB Eichstätt qualified as runners-up of the Regionalliga Bayern as the champions Bayern Munich II were ineligible to participate.); Berlin: Viktoria Berlin; Brandenburg: Energie Cottbus; Bremen: FC Oberneuland; Hamburg: TuS Dassendorf; Hesse: KSV Baunatal (Note: KSV Baunatal qualified regardless of the outcome of the final of the Hessian Cup, as Wehen Wiesbaden, the other finalists, already qualified for the DFB-Pokal through their 3. Liga position.)	Lower Rhine: KFC Uerdingen; Lower Saxony (Note: The Lower Saxony Cup was split into two paths: one for 3. Liga and Regionalliga Nord teams, and the other for amateur teams. The winners of each path qualified.): SV Drochtersen/Assel (3L/RL); Atlas Delmenhorst (Am.); Mecklenburg-Vorpommern: Hansa Rostock; Middle Rhine: Alemannia Aachen; Rhineland: FSV Salmrohr; Saarland: 1. FC Saarbrücken; Saxony: Chemnitzer FC	Saxony-Anhalt: Germania Halberstadt (Note: Germania Halberstadt qualified regardless of the outcome of the final of the Saxony-Anhalt Cup, as Hallescher FC, the other finalists, already qualified for the DFB-Pokal through their 3. Liga position.); Schleswig-Holstein: VfB Lübeck; South Baden: FC 08 Villingen; Southwest: 1. FC Kaiserslautern; Thuringia: Wacker Nordhausen; Westphalia (Note: In addition to the Westphalian Cup winners, the winners of a play-off between the best-placed amateur Westphalian team of the Regionalliga West and the best-placed amateur team of the Oberliga Westfalen also qualified.): SV Rödinghausen (CW); SC Verl (PO); Württemberg: SSV Ulm

== Format ==
=== Participation ===
The DFB-Pokal began with a round of 64 teams. The 36 teams of the Bundesliga and 2. Bundesliga, along with the top four finishers of the 3. Liga, automatically qualified for the tournament. Of the remaining slots, 21 were given to the cup winners of the regional football associations, the Verbandspokal. The three remaining slots were given to the three regional associations with the most men's teams, which were Bavaria, Lower Saxony and Westphalia. The best-placed amateur team of the Regionalliga Bayern was given the spot for Bavaria. For Lower Saxony, the Lower Saxony Cup was split into two paths: one for 3. Liga and Regionalliga Nord teams, and the other for amateur teams. The winners of each path qualified. For Westphalia, the winner of a play-off between the best-placed team of the Regionalliga West and Oberliga Westfalen also qualified. As every team was entitled to participate in local tournaments which qualified for the association cups, every team could in principle compete in the DFB-Pokal. Reserve teams and combined football sections were not permitted to enter, along with no two teams of the same association or corporation.

=== Draw ===
The draws for the different rounds were conducted as follows:

For the first round, the participating teams were split into two pots of 32 teams each. The first pot contained all teams which qualified through their regional cup competitions, the best four teams of the 3. Liga, and the bottom four teams of the 2. Bundesliga. Every team from this pot was drawn to a team from the second pot, which contained all remaining professional teams (all the teams of the Bundesliga and the remaining fourteen 2. Bundesliga teams). The teams from the first pot were set as the home team in the process.

The two-pot scenario was also applied for the second round, with the remaining 3. Liga and/or amateur team(s) in the first pot and the remaining Bundesliga and 2. Bundesliga teams in the other pot. Once again, the 3. Liga and/or amateur team(s) served as hosts. This time the pots did not have to be of equal size though, depending on the results of the first round. Theoretically, it was even possible that there could be only one pot, if all of the teams from one of the pots from the first round had beat all the others in the second pot. Once one pot was empty, the remaining pairings were drawn from the other pot, with the first-drawn team for a match serving as hosts.

For the remaining rounds, the draw was conducted from just one pot. Any remaining 3. Liga and/or amateur team(s) were the home team if drawn against a professional team. In every other case, the first-drawn team served as hosts.

=== Match rules ===
Teams met in one game per round. Matches took place for 90 minutes, with two halves of 45 minutes each. If still tied after regulation, 30 minutes of extra time were played, consisting of two periods of 15 minutes each. If the score was still level after this, the match was decided by a penalty shoot-out. A coin toss would decide who took the first penalty. The number of substitutes allowed on the bench was increased from seven to nine for the 2019–20 season. Initially, three substitutions were allowed during regulation, with a fourth allowed in extra time. From the round of 16 onward, a video assistant referee was appointed for all DFB-Pokal matches. Though technically possible, VAR was not used for home matches of Bundesliga clubs prior to the round of 16 in order to provide a uniform approach to all matches.

For the semi-finals and final, a maximum of five substitutions were allowed. However, each team was only given three opportunities to make substitutions, with a fourth opportunity in extra time, excluding substitutions made at half-time, before the start of extra time and at half-time in extra time.

=== Suspensions ===
If a player received five yellow cards in the competition, he was then suspended from the next cup match. Similarly, receiving a second yellow card suspended a player from the next cup match. If a player received a direct red card, they were suspended a minimum of one match, but the German Football Association reserved the right to increase the suspension.

=== Champion qualification ===
The winners of the DFB-Pokal typically earned automatic qualification for the group stage of next year's edition of the UEFA Europa League. If they had already qualified for the UEFA Champions League through position in the Bundesliga, then the spot would go to the team in sixth place, and the league's second qualifying round spot would go to the team in seventh place. The winners also typically hosted the DFL-Supercup at the start of the next season, facing the champions of the previous year's Bundesliga, unless the same team won the Bundesliga and the DFB-Pokal, completing a double. In that case, the runners-up of the Bundesliga took the spot and hosted instead.

== Schedule ==
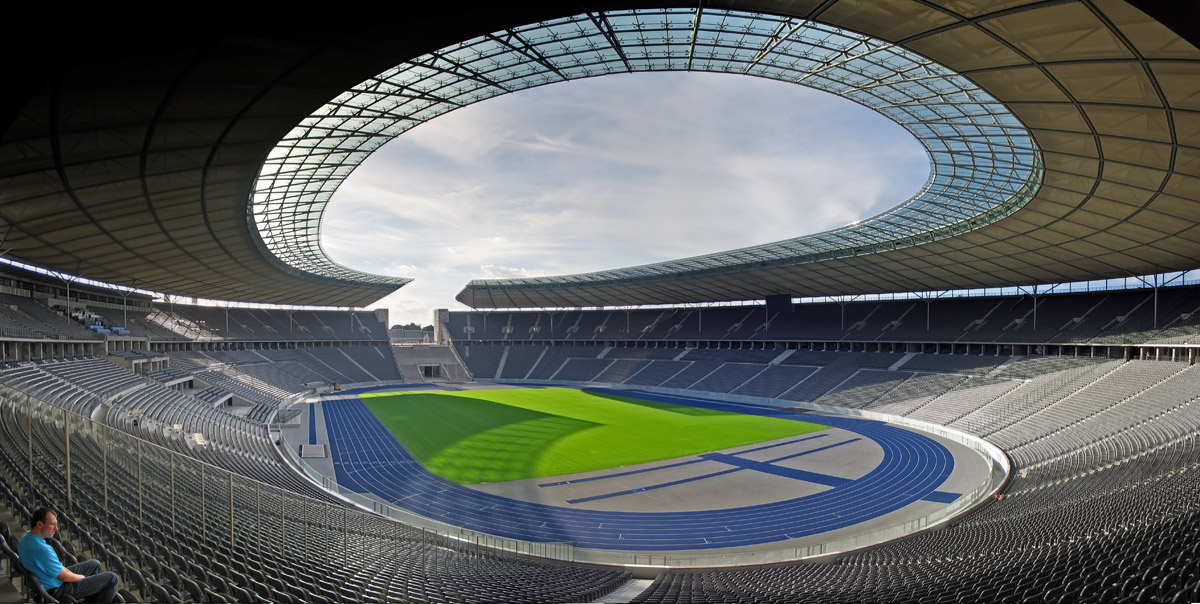
The Olympiastadion in Berlin hosted the final.

All draws were held at the German Football Museum in Dortmund, on a Sunday evening at 18:00 after each round (unless noted otherwise). The draws were televised on ARD's Sportschau, broadcast on Das Erste.

The rounds of the 2019–20 competition were scheduled as follows:

Round	Draw date	Matches
First round	15 June 2019	9–12 August 2019
Second round	18 August 2019	29–30 October 2019
Round of 16	3 November 2019	4–5 February 2020
Quarter-finals	9 February 2020	3–4 March 2020
Semi-finals	8 March 2020	9–10 June 2020 (originally 21–22 April 2020)
Final	8 March 2020	4 July 2020 (originally 23 May 2020) at Olympiastadion, Berlin

== Matches ==
A total of sixty-three matches took place, starting with the first round on 9 August 2019 and culminating with the final on 4 July 2020 at the Olympiastadion in Berlin.

Times up to 26 October 2019 and from 29 March 2020 are CEST (UTC+2). Times from 27 October 2019 to 28 March 2020 are CET (UTC+1).

=== First round ===
The draw for the first round was held on 15 June 2019 at 18:00, with Nia Künzer drawing the matches. The thirty-two matches took place from 9 to 12 August 2019.

9 August 2019	KFC Uerdingen	0–2	Borussia Dortmund	Düsseldorf (Note: The KFC Uerdingen v Borussia Dortmund match took place at the Merkur Spiel-Arena in Düsseldorf instead of KFC Uerdingen's home stadium.)
20:45		Report	Reus 49'; Alcácer 70'	Stadium: Merkur Spiel-Arena; Attendance: 32,110; Referee: Sascha Stegemann

9 August 2019	FC Ingolstadt	0–1	1. FC Nürnberg	Ingolstadt
20:45		Report	Dovedan 87'	Stadium: Audi Sportpark; Attendance: 14,348; Referee: Daniel Siebert

9 August 2019	SV Sandhausen	0–1	Borussia Mönchengladbach	Sandhausen
21:30 (Note: The SV Sandhausen v Borussia Mönchengladbach match, originally scheduled for 20:45 CEST, was delayed to 21:30 CEST due to adverse weather conditions.)		Report	Thuram 19'	Stadium: BWT-Stadion am Hardtwald; Attendance: 13,695; Referee: Robert Hartmann

10 August 2019	1. FC Kaiserslautern	2–0	Mainz 05	Kaiserslautern
15:30	Starke 63' (pen.); Pick 90'	Report		Stadium: Fritz-Walter-Stadion; Attendance: 40,694; Referee: Felix Zwayer

10 August 2019	Alemannia Aachen	1–4	Bayer Leverkusen	Aachen
15:30	Batarilo 56'	Report	Hackenberg 19' (o.g.); Volland 39'; Bailey 72'; Havertz 88'	Stadium: New Tivoli; Attendance: 30,861; Referee: Martin Petersen

10 August 2019	TuS Dassendorf	0–3	Dynamo Dresden	Zwickau (Note: The TuS Dassendorf v Dynamo Dresden match took place at the Stadion Zwickau in Zwickau instead of TuS Dassendorf's home stadium.)
15:30		Report	C. Löwe 37'; Burnić 75'; Röser 77'	Stadium: Stadion Zwickau; Attendance: 5,673; Referee: Jonas Weickenmeier

10 August 2019	FC 08 Villingen	1–3 (a.e.t.)	Fortuna Düsseldorf	Villingen-Schwenningen
15:30	Ukoh 42' (pen.)	Report	Ampomah 56'; Ofori 102'; Hennings 116'	Stadium: MS Technologie Arena; Attendance: 8,000; Referee: Florian Heft

10 August 2019	SV Drochtersen/Assel	0–5	Schalke 04	Drochtersen
15:30		Report	Skrzybski 44'; Burgstaller 61', 83'; Caligiuri 65' (pen.); Mercan 73'	Stadium: Kehdinger Stadion; Attendance: 8,000; Referee: Michael Bacher

10 August 2019	Viktoria Berlin	0–1	Arminia Bielefeld	Berlin (Note: The Viktoria Berlin v Arminia Bielefeld match took place at the Friedrich-Ludwig-Jahn-Sportpark in Berlin instead of Viktoria Berlin's home stadium.)
15:30		Report	Voglsammer 15'	Stadium: Friedrich-Ludwig-Jahn-Sportpark; Attendance: 4,503; Referee: Franz Bokop

10 August 2019	SC Verl	2–1	FC Augsburg	Verl
15:30	Suchý 8' (o.g.); Schallenberg 23'	Report	Hahn 83' (pen.)	Stadium: Sportclub Arena; Attendance: 4,198; Referee: Martin Thomsen

10 August 2019	Wacker Nordhausen	1–4	Erzgebirge Aue	Nordhausen
15:30	Mickels 22'	Report	Baumgart 38'; Hochschieidt 57'; Testroet 80', 84'	Stadium: Albert-Kuntz-Sportpark; Attendance: 4,347; Referee: Christof Günsch

10 August 2019	1. FC Magdeburg	0–1 (a.e.t.)	SC Freiburg	Magdeburg
15:30		Report	Waldschmidt 93'	Stadium: MDCC-Arena; Attendance: 14,093; Referee: Harm Osmers

10 August 2019	Würzburger Kickers	3–3 (a.e.t.) (4–5 p)	1899 Hoffenheim	Würzburg
18:30	Kaufmann 68'; Vrenezi 75' (pen.); Pfeiffer 114'	Report	Kadeřábek 29'; Bebou 54'; Szalai 99'	Stadium: Flyeralarm Arena; Attendance: 10,000; Referee: Guido Winkmann
	Penalties
	Hägele (penalty scored); Schuppan (penalty scored); Kaufmann (penalty missed); Vrenezi (penalty scored); Widemann (penalty scored); Hansen (penalty missed)		(penalty scored) Szalai; (penalty scored) Bebou; (penalty scored) Skov; (penalty scored) Rudy; (penalty missed) Rupp; (penalty scored) Posch

10 August 2019	KSV Baunatal	2–3	VfL Bochum	Baunatal
18:30	Blahout 32'; Schrader 45+2'	Report	Ganvoula 17' (pen.), 70', 73'	Stadium: Parkstadion Baunatal; Attendance: 5,748; Referee: Wolfgang Haslberger

10 August 2019	SSV Ulm	0–2	1. FC Heidenheim	Ulm
18:30		Report	Leipertz 7'; Schnatterer 71' (pen.)	Stadium: Donaustadion; Attendance: 19,000; Referee: Florian Badstübner

10 August 2019	Atlas Delmenhorst	1–6	Werder Bremen	Bremen (Note: The Atlas Delmenhorst v Werder Bremen took place at the Wohninvest Weserstadion in Bremen instead of Atlas Delmenhorst's home stadium.)
20:45	Schmidt 30'	Report	Osako 10'; Moisander 19'; Rashica 37'; Klaassen 40'; Pizarro 68', 74'	Stadium: Wohninvest Weserstadion; Attendance: 41,500; Referee: Patrick Ittrich

11 August 2019	FSV Salmrohr	0–6	Holstein Kiel	Salmtal
15:30		Report	Baku 39', 65', 76'; Lee 54'; Atanga 63'; Porath 88'	Stadium: Salmtalstadion; Attendance: 6,500; Referee: Thorben Siewer

11 August 2019	Germania Halberstadt	0–6	Union Berlin	Halberstadt
15:30		Report	Schlotterbeck 27'; Andersson 65'; Lenz 67'; Mees 71'; Andrich 76'; Ujah 89'	Stadium: Friedenstadion; Attendance: 6,000; Referee: Tobias Reichel

11 August 2019	SV Rödinghausen	3–3 (a.e.t.) (2–4 p)	SC Paderborn	Rödinghausen
15:30	Engelmann 53'; Lokotsch 79', 85'	Report	Hünemeier 28'; Antwi-Adjei 43'; Mamba 73'	Stadium: Häcker Wiehenstadion; Attendance: 2,236; Referee: Arne Aarnink
	Penalties
	Lokotsch (penalty missed); Backszat (penalty scored); Wolff (penalty scored); Steffen (penalty missed)		(penalty scored) Hünemeier; (penalty scored) Gjasula; (penalty scored) Collins; (penalty scored) Cauly

11 August 2019	Waldhof Mannheim	3–5	Eintracht Frankfurt	Mannheim
15:30	Sulejmani 3', 11'; Marx 72'	Report	Kamada 21'; Kostić 45+1'; Rebić 76', 81', 88'	Stadium: Carl-Benz-Stadion; Attendance: 24,302; Referee: Felix Brych

11 August 2019	FC Oberneuland	1–6	Darmstadt 98	Bremen
15:30	Jobe 48'	Report	Schnellhardt 32'; Mehlem 37'; Dursun 43', 56', 75'; Skarke 89'	Stadium: Florian Wellmann Stadion; Attendance: 4,500; Referee: Pascal Müller

11 August 2019	1. FC Saarbrücken	3–2	Jahn Regensburg	Völklingen (Note: 1. FC Saarbrücken play their home matches at the Hermann-Neuberger-Stadion in Völklingen due to the rebuilding of the Ludwigsparkstadion in Saarbrücken.)
15:30	Jurcher 53', 90+3'; Zeitz 76'	Report	Besuschkow 64' (pen.); Grüttner 74'	Stadium: Hermann-Neuberger-Stadion; Attendance: 4,000; Referee: Sven Waschitzki

11 August 2019	VfB Lübeck	3–3 (a.e.t.) (3–4 p)	FC St. Pauli	Lübeck
15:30	Deichmann 9'; Thiel 55'; Arslan 115'	Report	Sobota 63'; Diamantakos 66'; Knoll 94'	Stadium: Stadion Lohmühle; Attendance: 15,292; Referee: Frank Willenborg
	Penalties
	Arslan (penalty missed); Malone (penalty scored); Halke (penalty scored); Matovina (penalty scored); Fernandes (penalty missed)		(penalty scored) Sobota; (penalty missed) Hoffmann; (penalty scored) Lankford; (penalty scored) Buchtmann; (penalty scored) Knoll

11 August 2019	VfB Eichstätt	1–5	Hertha BSC	Ingolstadt (Note: The VfB Eichstätt v Hertha BSC match took place at the Audi Sportpark in Ingolstadt instead of VfB Eichstätt's home stadium.)
15:30	Kügel 51'	Report	Darida 11'; Ibišević 12', 31'; Kalou 62'; Esswein 75'	Stadium: Audi Sportpark; Attendance: 7,030; Referee: Timo Gerach

11 August 2019	VfL Osnabrück	2–3	RB Leipzig	Osnabrück
15:30	Amenyido 9'; Álvarez 73' (pen.)	Report	Sabitzer 7', 31'; Klostermann 29'	Stadium: Stadion an der Bremer Brücke; Attendance: 16,667; Referee: Tobias Stieler

11 August 2019	Chemnitzer FC	2–2 (a.e.t.) (5–6 p)	Hamburger SV	Chemnitz
18:30	Božić 57' (pen.); Langer 68'	Report	Hinterseer 62'; Kittel 75'	Stadium: Stadion an der Gellertstraße; Attendance: 13,130; Referee: Robert Kampka
	Penalties
	Müller (penalty scored); Sarmov (penalty scored); Bonga (penalty scored); Schoppenhauer (penalty missed); Tallig (penalty scored); Itter (penalty scored); Reddemann (penalty missed)		(penalty scored) Kittel; (penalty scored) Hinterseer; (penalty missed) Narey; (penalty scored) Wintzheimer; (penalty scored) Jairo; (penalty scored) Van Drongelen; (penalty scored) Fein

11 August 2019	MSV Duisburg	2–0	Greuther Fürth	Duisburg
18:30	Daschner 4'; Albutat 14'	Report		Stadium: Schauinsland-Reisen-Arena; Attendance: 14,000; Referee: Christian Dingert

11 August 2019	Wehen Wiesbaden	3–3 (a.e.t.) (2–3 p)	1. FC Köln	Wiesbaden
18:30	Lorch 53', 56'; Kyereh 118'	Report	Córdoba 39'; Kainz 42'; Schaub 107'	Stadium: Brita-Arena; Attendance: 8,000; Referee: Robert Schröder
	Penalties
	Kuhn (penalty scored); Gül (penalty missed); Guthörl (penalty missed); Kyereh (penalty missed); Ajani (penalty scored)		(penalty scored) Terodde; (penalty scored) Kainz; (penalty missed) Modeste; (penalty missed) Hector; (penalty scored) Verstraete

12 August 2019	Hallescher FC	3–5 (a.e.t.)	VfL Wolfsburg	Halle
18:30	Drinkuth 43'; Mai 57'; Fetsch 90+2'	Report	Weghorst 44'; Gerhardt 49'; William 70'; Knoche 92'; Brekalo 94'	Stadium: Erdgas Sportpark; Attendance: 13,500; Referee: Markus Schmidt

12 August 2019	Karlsruher SC	2–0	Hannover 96	Karlsruhe
18:30	Grozurek 53'; Wanitzek 61' (pen.)	Report		Stadium: Wildparkstadion; Attendance: 11,779; Referee: Benjamin Cortus

12 August 2019	Hansa Rostock	0–1	VfB Stuttgart	Rostock
18:30		Report	Al Ghaddioui 19'	Stadium: Ostseestadion; Attendance: 24,000; Referee: Sven Jablonski

12 August 2019	Energie Cottbus	1–3	Bayern Munich	Cottbus
20:45	Taz 90+3' (pen.)	Report	Lewandowski 32'; Coman 65'; Goretzka 85'	Stadium: Stadion der Freundschaft; Attendance: 20,602; Referee: Patrick Ittrich

=== Second round ===
The draw for the second round was held on 18 August 2019 at 18:00, with Sebastian Kehl drawing the matches. The sixteen matches took place from 29 to 30 October 2019.

29 October 2019	Hamburger SV	1–2 (a.e.t.)	VfB Stuttgart	Hamburg
18:30	Hunt 16' (pen.)	Report	González 2' (pen.); Al Ghaddioui 113'	Stadium: Volksparkstadion; Attendance: 45,503; Referee: Bastian Dankert

29 October 2019	1. FC Saarbrücken	3–2	1. FC Köln	Völklingen
18:30	Schorch 53'; Jurcher 57'; Jänicke 90'	Report	Hector 70'; Terodde 84'	Stadium: Hermann-Neuberger-Stadion; Attendance: 6,800; Referee: Martin Petersen

29 October 2019	SC Freiburg	1–3	Union Berlin	Freiburg
18:30	Koch 45+2'	Report	Mees 36'; Andrich 87'; Gentner 90+2'	Stadium: Schwarzwald-Stadion; Attendance: 24,000; Referee: Robert Kampka

29 October 2019	MSV Duisburg	0–2	1899 Hoffenheim	Duisburg
18:30		Report	Grillitsch 53'; Adamyan 59'	Stadium: Schauinsland-Reisen-Arena; Attendance: 14,306; Referee: Sören Storks

29 October 2019	VfL Bochum	1–2	Bayern Munich	Bochum
20:00	Davies 35' (o.g.)	Report	Gnabry 83'; Müller 89'	Stadium: Vonovia Ruhrstadion; Attendance: 26,600; Referee: Robert Schröder

29 October 2019	Arminia Bielefeld	2–3	Schalke 04	Bielefeld
20:45	Klos 72'; Soukou 77'	Report	Schöpf 16'; Raman 25', 31'	Stadium: SchücoArena; Attendance: 26,203; Referee: Manuel Gräfe

29 October 2019	Darmstadt 98	0–1	Karlsruher SC	Darmstadt
20:45		Report	Hofmann 85'	Stadium: Merck-Stadion am Böllenfalltor; Attendance: 11,240; Referee: Florian Badstübner

29 October 2019	Bayer Leverkusen	1–0	SC Paderborn	Leverkusen
20:45	Alario 25'	Report		Stadium: BayArena; Attendance: 15,410; Referee: Sven Jablonski

30 October 2019	VfL Wolfsburg	1–6	RB Leipzig	Wolfsburg
18:30	Weghorst 89'	Report	Bruma 13' (o.g.); Sabitzer 55'; Forsberg 58'; Laimer 61'; Werner 68', 88'	Stadium: Volkswagen Arena; Attendance: 17,705; Referee: Felix Zwayer

30 October 2019	Werder Bremen	4–1	1. FC Heidenheim	Bremen
18:30	Rashica 6'; Bittencourt 11'; Klaassen 18'; Friedl 41'	Report	Schnatterer 45+1' (pen.)	Stadium: Wohninvest Weserstadion; Attendance: 38,663; Referee: Daniel Schlager

30 October 2019	SC Verl	1–1 (a.e.t.) (8–7 p)	Holstein Kiel	Verl
18:30	Hecker 45+1'	Report	Serra 13'	Stadium: Sportclub Arena; Attendance: 5,153; Referee: Christof Günsch
	Penalties
	Janjić (penalty scored); Lach (penalty scored); Ritzka (penalty scored); Choroba (penalty missed); Schröder (penalty scored); Haeder (penalty scored); Stöckner (penalty scored); Andzouana (penalty scored); Schöppner (penalty scored)		(penalty scored) Wahl; (penalty scored) Khelifi; (penalty scored) Mühling; (penalty scored) Porath; (penalty missed) Iyoha; (penalty scored) Lee; (penalty scored) Schmidt; (penalty scored) Eberwein; (penalty missed) Neumann

30 October 2019	1. FC Kaiserslautern	2–2 (a.e.t.) (6–5 p)	1. FC Nürnberg	Kaiserslautern
18:30	Thiele 8' (pen.), 74' (pen.)	Report	Jäger 15'; Frey 89'	Stadium: Fritz-Walter-Stadion; Attendance: 21,714; Referee: Guido Winkmann
	Penalties
	Kraus (penalty scored); Röser (penalty scored); Starke (penalty scored); Kühlwetter (penalty scored); Hemlein (penalty scored); Bjarnason (penalty scored)		(penalty scored) Geis; (penalty scored) Hack; (penalty scored) Dovedan; (penalty scored) Frey; (penalty scored) Sørensen; (penalty missed) Handwerker

30 October 2019	Borussia Dortmund	2–1	Borussia Mönchengladbach	Dortmund
20:45	Brandt 77', 80'	Report	Thuram 71'	Stadium: Signal Iduna Park; Attendance: 79,800; Referee: Benjamin Cortus

30 October 2019	FC St. Pauli	1–2	Eintracht Frankfurt	Hamburg
20:45	Sobota 42' (pen.)	Report	Dost 4', 16'	Stadium: Millerntor-Stadion; Attendance: 29,373; Referee: Matthias Jöllenbeck

30 October 2019	Hertha BSC	3–3 (a.e.t.) (5–4 p)	Dynamo Dresden	Berlin
20:45	Lukebakio 48'; Duda 85' (pen.); Torunarigha 120+2'	Report	Koné 36'; Ebert 90' (pen.); Štor 107'	Stadium: Olympiastadion; Attendance: 70,429; Referee: Tobias Stieler
	Penalties
	Ibišević (penalty scored); Darida (penalty scored); Dilrosun (penalty scored); Rekik (penalty missed); Selke (penalty scored); Grujić (penalty scored)		(penalty scored) Ebert; (penalty scored) Horvath; (penalty missed) Müller; (penalty scored) Koné; (penalty scored) Štor; (penalty missed) Ehlers

30 October 2019	Fortuna Düsseldorf	2–1	Erzgebirge Aue	Düsseldorf
20:45	Hennings 45' (pen.); Nuhu 75'	Report	Krüger 12'	Stadium: Merkur Spiel-Arena; Attendance: 20,141; Referee: Tobias Reichel

=== Round of 16 ===
The draw for the round of 16 was held on 3 November 2019 at 18:00, with Turid Knaak drawing the matches. The eight matches took place from 4 to 5 February 2020.

4 February 2020	Eintracht Frankfurt	3–1	RB Leipzig	Frankfurt
18:30	Silva 17' (pen.); Kostić 51', 90+5'	Report	Olmo 69'	Stadium: Commerzbank-Arena; Attendance: 47,400; Referee: Felix Brych

4 February 2020	1. FC Kaiserslautern	2–5	Fortuna Düsseldorf	Kaiserslautern
18:30	Kühlwetter 10', 39' (pen.)	Report	Ampomah 9'; Hennings 49', 78'; Zimmermann 65'; Stöger 83'	Stadium: Fritz-Walter-Stadion; Attendance: 35,340; Referee: Markus Schmidt

4 February 2020	Schalke 04	3–2 (a.e.t.)	Hertha BSC	Gelsenkirchen
20:45	Caligiuri 76'; Harit 82'; Raman 115'	Report	Köpke 12'; Piątek 39'	Stadium: Veltins-Arena; Attendance: 53,525; Referee: Harm Osmers

4 February 2020	Werder Bremen	3–2	Borussia Dortmund	Bremen
20:45	Selke 16'; Bittencourt 30'; Rashica 70'	Report	Haaland 67'; Reyna 78'	Stadium: Wohninvest Weserstadion; Attendance: 41,616; Referee: Guido Winkmann

5 February 2020	Bayer Leverkusen	2–1	VfB Stuttgart	Leverkusen
18:30	Bredlow 72' (o.g.); Alario 83'	Report	Silas 85'	Stadium: BayArena; Attendance: 20,000; Referee: Bibiana Steinhaus

5 February 2020	SC Verl	0–1	Union Berlin	Verl
18:30		Report	Andrich 85'	Stadium: Sportclub Arena; Attendance: 5,135; Referee: Sven Jablonski

5 February 2020	Bayern Munich	4–3	1899 Hoffenheim	Munich
20:45	Hübner 13' (o.g.); Müller 20'; Lewandowski 36', 80'	Report	Boateng 8' (o.g.); Dabbur 82', 90+2'	Stadium: Allianz Arena; Attendance: 71,500; Referee: Sascha Stegemann

5 February 2020	1. FC Saarbrücken	0–0 (a.e.t.) (5–3 p)	Karlsruher SC	Völklingen
20:45		Report		Stadium: Hermann-Neuberger-Stadion; Attendance: 6,800; Referee: Sören Storks
	Penalties
	Zellner (penalty scored); Golley (penalty scored); Zeitz (penalty scored); Miotke (penalty scored); Schorch (penalty scored)		(penalty scored) Hofmann; (penalty scored) Djuricin; (penalty missed) Pisot; (penalty scored) Wanitzek

=== Quarter-finals ===
The draw for the quarter-finals was held on 9 February 2020 at 18:00, with Cacau drawing the matches. The four matches took place from 3 to 4 March 2020.

3 March 2020	1. FC Saarbrücken	1–1 (a.e.t.) (7–6 p)	Fortuna Düsseldorf	Völklingen
18:30	Jänicke 31'	Report	Jørgensen 90'	Stadium: Hermann-Neuberger-Stadion; Attendance: 6,800; Referee: Deniz Aytekin
	Penalties
	Zellner (penalty missed); Jacob (penalty scored); Zeitz (penalty scored); Golley (penalty missed); Schorch (penalty scored); Andrist (penalty missed); Froese (penalty scored); Barylla (penalty scored); Jänicke (penalty scored); Müller (penalty scored)		(penalty scored) Ayhan; (penalty scored) Hennings; (penalty missed) Karaman; (penalty scored) Skrzybski; (penalty missed) Stöger; (penalty missed) Zimmermann; (penalty scored) Suttner; (penalty scored) Ampomah; (penalty scored) Morales; (penalty missed) Jørgensen

3 March 2020	Schalke 04	0–1	Bayern Munich	Gelsenkirchen
20:45		Report	Kimmich 40'	Stadium: Veltins-Arena; Attendance: 62,271; Referee: Tobias Stieler

4 March 2020	Bayer Leverkusen	3–1	Union Berlin	Leverkusen
18:30	Bellarabi 72'; Aránguiz 86'; Diaby 90+1'	Report	Ingvartsen 39'	Stadium: BayArena; Attendance: 18,453; Referee: Benjamin Cortus

4 March 2020	Eintracht Frankfurt	2–0	Werder Bremen	Frankfurt
20:45	Silva 45+6' (pen.); Kamada 60'	Report		Stadium: Commerzbank-Arena; Attendance: 51,500; Referee: Felix Zwayer

=== Semi-finals ===
The draw for the semi-finals was held on 8 March 2020 at 18:00, with Almuth Schult drawing the matches. The two matches took place from 9 to 10 June 2020.

1. FC Saarbrücken of the Regionalliga Südwest became the first fourth-division club in the history of the DFB-Pokal to reach the semi-finals of the competition.

9 June 2020
20:45

1. FC Saarbrücken	0–3	Bayer Leverkusen
	Report	Diaby 11'; Alario 19'; Bellarabi 58'

Hermann-Neuberger-Stadion, Völklingen
Attendance: 0 (Note: The semi-finals and final was played behind closed doors due to the COVID-19 pandemic in Germany.)
Referee: Guido Winkmann

10 June 2020
20:45

Bayern Munich	2–1	Eintracht Frankfurt
Perišić 14'; Lewandowski 74'	Report	Da Costa 69'

Allianz Arena, Munich
Attendance: 0
Referee: Marco Fritz

=== Final ===
The final took place on 4 July 2020 at the Olympiastadion in Berlin.

4 July 2020
20:00 CEST

Bayer Leverkusen	2–4	Bayern Munich
S. Bender 64'; Havertz 90+5' (pen.)	Report	Alaba 16'; Gnabry 24'; Lewandowski 59', 89'

Olympiastadion, Berlin
Attendance: 0
Referee: Tobias Welz (Wiesbaden)

== Top goalscorers ==
The following were the top scorers of the DFB-Pokal, sorted first by number of goals, and then alphabetically if necessary. Goals scored in penalty shoot-outs are not included.

Rank	Player	Team	Goals
1	(Poland) Robert Lewandowski	Bayern Munich	6
2	(Germany) Rouwen Hennings	Fortuna Düsseldorf	4
3	(Argentina) Lucas Alario	Bayer Leverkusen	3
3	(Germany) Robert Andrich	Union Berlin	3
3	(Germany) Makana Baku	Holstein Kiel	3
3	(Germany) Serdar Dursun	Darmstadt 98	3
3	(Republic of the Congo) Silvère Ganvoula	VfL Bochum	3
3	(Germany) Gillian Jurcher	1. FC Saarbrücken	3
3	(Serbia) Filip Kostić	Eintracht Frankfurt	3
3	(Belgium) Benito Raman	Schalke 04	3
3	(Kosovo) Milot Rashica	Werder Bremen	3
3	(Croatia) Ante Rebić	Eintracht Frankfurt	3
3	(Austria) Marcel Sabitzer	RB Leipzig	3
