= 2016–17 VfL Wolfsburg season =

VfL Wolfsburg
2016–17 season
- Manager: Dieter Hecking (until 17 October); Valérien Ismaël (interim, 17 October–6 November; head coach, 6 November–26 February); Andries Jonker (from 27 February)
- Stadium: Volkswagen Arena
- Bundesliga: 16th (play-off winners)
- DFB-Pokal: Round of 16
- Top goalscorer: League: Mario Gómez (16); All: Mario Gómez (18)
- Highest home attendance: 30,000
- Lowest home attendance: 23,148
- Average home league attendance: 27,586
- Biggest win: Freiburg 0–3 Wolfsburg; Wolfsburg 3–0 Ingolstadt
- Biggest defeat: Wolfsburg 0–6 Bayern
Home colours	Away colours	Third colours
- All statistics correct as of 27 May 2017.

The 2016–17 VfL Wolfsburg season was the 72nd season in the club's football history.

== Background ==
VfL Wolfsburg finished the 2015–16 Bundesliga season in 8th place, thus ensuring a place in the 2016–17 Bundesliga.

== Players ==
=== Squad ===
Note: Flags indicate national team as defined under FIFA eligibility rules; some limited exceptions apply. Players may hold more than one non-FIFA nationality.

No.	Pos.	Nation	Player
1	GK	SUI	Diego Benaglio (captain)
2	DF	GER	Philipp Wollscheid (on loan from Stoke City)
5	DF	NED	Jeffrey Bruma
6	MF	NED	Riechedly Bazoer
8	MF	POR	Vieirinha
9	MF	FRA	Paul-Georges Ntep
10	MF	TUR	Yunus Mallı
11	MF	GER	Daniel Didavi
13	MF	GER	Yannick Gerhardt
14	MF	POL	Jakub Błaszczykowski (3rd captain)
15	DF	GER	Christian Träsch
17	FW	ESP	Borja Mayoral (on loan from Real Madrid)
18	FW	NGA	Victor Osimhen
20	GK	GER	Max Grün
21	DF	GER	Jannes Horn
22	MF	BRA	Luiz Gustavo (vice-captain)

No.	Pos.	Nation	Player
23	MF	FRA	Josuha Guilavogui
24	DF	GER	Sebastian Jung
25	MF	IRN	Ashkan Dejagah
26	MF	GER	Justin Möbius
27	MF	GER	Maximilian Arnold
28	GK	BEL	Koen Casteels
29	MF	GER	Amara Condé
30	MF	GER	Paul Seguin
31	DF	GER	Robin Knoche
33	FW	GER	Mario Gómez
34	DF	SUI	Ricardo Rodríguez
35	DF	GER	Gian-Luca Itter
36	GK	GER	Phillip Menzel
38	MF	BEL	Ismail Azzaoui
40	DF	GER	Robin Ziegele
41	DF	GER	Hendrik Hansen

=== Transfers ===
==== In ====
No.	Pos.	Name	Age	EU	Moving from	Type	Transfer Window	Contract ends	Transfer fee	Sources
2	Defender	Philipp Wollscheid	27	Yes	Stoke City	Loan	Summer	30 June 2017	—	
5	Defender	Jeffrey Bruma	24	Yes	PSV Eindhoven	Transfer	Summer	30 June 2021	€11,500,000	
11	Midfielder	Daniel Didavi	26	Yes	VfB Stuttgart	Transfer	Summer	30 June 2021	Free	
13	Midfielder	Yannick Gerhardt	22	Yes	1. FC Köln	Transfer	Summer	30 June 2021	€13,000,000	
14	Midfielder	Jakub Błaszczykowski	30	Yes	Borussia Dortmund	Transfer	Summer	30 June 2019	€5,000,000	
17	Forward	Borja Mayoral	19	Yes	Real Madrid	Loan	Summer	30 June 2017	—	
23	Midfielder	Josuha Guilavogui	25	Yes	Atlético Madrid	Buy option exercised	Summer	30 June 2019	€3,000,000	
25	Forward	Josip Brekalo	18	Yes	Dinamo Zagreb	Transfer	Summer	30 June 2021	€6,000,000	
29	Midfielder	Amara Condé	19	Yes	VfL Wolfsburg U19	Academy	Summer	30 June 2018	Free	
33	Forward	Mario Gómez	31	Yes	Fiorentina	Transfer	Summer	30 June 2019	€7,000,000	
39	Forward	Oskar Zawada	20	Yes	Twente	Return from loan	Summer	30 June 2018		
40	Defender	Robin Ziegele	19	Yes	VfL Wolfsburg U19	Academy	Summer	30 June 2018	Free	
—	Midfielder	Francisco Rodríguez	20	Yes	Arminia Bielefeld	Return from loan	Summer	30 June 2018	—	
6	Midfielder	Riechedly Bazoer	20	Yes	Ajax	Transfer	Winter	30 June 2021	€12,000,000	
9	Forward	Paul-Georges Ntep	24	Yes	Rennes	Transfer	Winter	30 June 2021	€5,000,000	
10	Midfielder	Yunus Mallı	24	Yes	Mainz 05	Transfer	Winter	30 June 2021	€12,500,000	
18	Forward	Victor Osimhen	18	No	Ultimate Strikers Academy	Transfer	Winter	30 June 2020	€3,500,000	
25	Midfielder	Ashkan Dejagah	30	Yes	Al-Arabi	Transfer	Winter	30 June 2017	Free	

==== Out ====
No.	Pos.	Name	Age	EU	Moving to	Type	Transfer Window	Transfer fee	Sources
3	Forward	Nicklas Bendtner	28	Yes	—	Release	Summer	—	
11	Forward	Max Kruse	28	Yes	Werder Bremen	Transfer	Summer	€7,500,000	
12	Forward	Bas Dost	27	Yes	Sporting CP	Transfer	Summer	€10,000,000	
17	Midfielder	André Schürrle	25	Yes	Borussia Dortmund	Transfer	Summer	€30,000,000	
18	Defender	Dante	32	No	Nice	Transfer	Summer	€2,500,000	
25	Defender	Naldo	33	No	Schalke 04	Transfer	Summer	Free	
26	Defender	Felipe	27	No	Chaves	Transfer	Summer	Free	
32	Forward	Leandro Putaro	19	Yes	Arminia Bielefeld	Loan	Summer	—	
37	Defender	Moritz Sprenger	21	Yes	1. FC Magdeburg	Loan	Summer	—	
—	Goalkeeper	Patrick Drewes	23	Yes	Preußen Münster	Loan	Summer	—	
—	Midfielder	Francisco Rodríguez	20	Yes	Luzern	Loan	Summer	—	
6	Defender	Carlos Ascues	24	No	FBC Melgar	Loan	Winter	—	
7	Midfielder	Daniel Caligiuri	29	Yes	Schalke 04	Transfer	Winter	€2,500,000	
10	Midfielder	Julian Draxler	23	Yes	Paris Saint-Germain	Transfer	Winter	€40,000,000	
16	Forward	Bruno Henrique	26	No	Santos	Transfer	Winter	€4,000,000	
25	Forward	Josip Brekalo	18	Yes	VfB Stuttgart	Loan	Winter	—	
35	Forward	Anton Donkor	19	Yes	Everton U23	Loan	Winter	—	

== Friendly matches ==
Win Draw Loss

9 July 2016 Friendly	Veltins-Auswahl	0–14	VfL Wolfsburg	Gifhorn, Germany
17:00 CEST (UTC+2)		Report	Didavi 27', 28'; Caligiuri 31'; Dost 36', 50'; Kruse 56', 82'; Bruma 61'; Brekalo 63', 65', 85'; Knoche 68'; Putaro 76'; Schäfer 87' (pen.)	Stadium: GWG-Stadion Flutmulde; Attendance: 1,900

16 July 2016 Friendly	Celtic	2–1	VfL Wolfsburg	Glasgow, Scotland
15:00 BST (UTC+1); 16:00 CEST (UTC+2)	McGregor 21'; Christie 62'	Report	Seguin 11'	Stadium: Celtic Park; Attendance: 25,000; Referee: Bobby Madden (Scotland)

19 July 2016 Friendly	Basel	3–3	VfL Wolfsburg	Basel, Switzerland
19:30 CEST (UTC+2)	Janko 69'; Høegh 72'; Elyounoussi 82'	Report	Dost 29'; Kruse 55'; Caligiuri 74'	Stadium: St. Jakob-Park; Attendance: 7,619; Referee: Adrien Jaccottet (Switzerland)

24 July 2016 Friendly	VfL Wolfsburg	0–2	Benfica	Altach, Austria
18:15 CEST (UTC+2)		Report	Mitroglou 63'; Jonas 90+1'	Stadium: Cashpoint-Arena; Attendance: 2,524; Referee: Robert Schörgenhofer (Austria)

30 July 2016 Troféu Cinco Violinos	Sporting CP	2–1	VfL Wolfsburg	Lisbon, Portugal
20:00 WEST (UTC+1); 21:00 CEST (UTC+2)	Slimani 26'; Adrien 34' (pen.)	Report	Donkor 78'	Stadium: Estádio José Alvalade; Attendance: 30,198; Referee: Rui Rodrigues (Portugal)

4 August 2016 Friendly	Malmö FF	0–1	VfL Wolfsburg	Malmö, Sweden
19:00 CEST (UTC+2)		Report	Rodríguez 85' (pen.)	Stadium: Swedbank Stadion; Attendance: 1,526; Referee: Kaspar Sjöberg (Sweden)

9 August 2016 Friendly	VfL Wolfsburg	1–0	Saint-Étienne	Hartberg, Austria
18:30 CEST (UTC+2)	Błaszczykowski 24'	Report		Stadium: Stadion Hartberg

8 January 2017 Florida Cup	Tampa Bay Rowdies	0–2	VfL Wolfsburg	St. Petersburg, Florida, USA
16:45 EST (UTC-5)		Report	Herrmann 6', 41'	Stadium: Al Lang Stadium; Referee: Jonathan Wener

12 January 2017 Florida Cup	VfL Wolfsburg	0–0 (3–2 p)	Bahia	ESPN Wide World of Sports Complex, Bay Lake
19:00 EST (UTC-5)				Referee: Vincent Apple-Chiarella
	Penalties
	Reichwein (penalty scored); Kleihs (penalty missed); Wimmer (penalty missed); Abdat (penalty scored); Herrmann (penalty scored)		Gustavo (penalty missed); Kaynan (penalty scored); Edson (penalty scored); Renato Cajá (penalty missed); Feijão (penalty missed)

== Competitions ==
Win Draw Loss

=== Overview ===
Competition	First match	Last match	Starting round	Final position	Record							
Competition	First match	Last match	Starting round	Final position	Pld	W	D	L	GF	GA	GD	Win %
Bundesliga	27 August 2016	20 May 2017	Matchday 1	16th	34	10	7	17	34	52	−18	29.41
Bundesliga relegation play-offs	25 May 2017	29 May 2017	First leg	Winners	2	2	0	0	2	0	+2	100.00
DFB-Pokal	20 August 2016	7 February 2017	First round	Round of 16	3	2	0	1	3	2	+1	66.67
Total					39	14	7	18	39	54	−15	35.90

Last updated: 27 May 2017
Source: Competitions

=== Bundesliga ===
==== League table ====
Pos	Team	Pld	W	D	L	GF	GA	GD	Pts	Qualification or relegation
14	Hamburger SV	34	10	8	16	33	61	−28	38	
15	Mainz 05	34	10	7	17	44	55	−11	37	
16	VfL Wolfsburg (O)	34	10	7	17	34	52	−18	37	Qualification for the relegation play-offs
17	FC Ingolstadt (R)	34	8	8	18	36	57	−21	32	Relegation to 2. Bundesliga
18	Darmstadt 98 (R)	34	7	4	23	28	63	−35	25	Relegation to 2. Bundesliga

Source: DFB
Rules for classification: 1) Points; 2) Goal difference; 3) Goals scored; 4) Head-to-head points; 5) Head-to-head goal difference; 6) Head-to-head away goals scored; 7) Away goals scored; 8) Play-off.
(O) Play-off winners; (R) Relegated

==== Results summary ====
Overall								Home						Away					
Pld	W	D	L	GF	GA	GD	Pts	W	D	L	GF	GA	GD	W	D	L	GF	GA	GD
34	10	7	17	34	52	−18	37	5	3	9	15	25	−10	5	4	8	19	27	−8

Last updated: 27 May 2017.
Source: Bundesliga

==== Results by round ====
Round	1	2	3	4	5	6	7	8	9	10	11	12	13	14	15	16	17	18	19	20	21	22	23	24	25	26	27	28	29	30	31	32	33	34
Ground	A	H	A	H	A	H	H	A	H	A	H	A	H	A	H	A	H	H	A	H	A	H	A	A	H	A	H	A	H	A	H	A	H	A
Result	W	D	D	L	L	D	L	L	L	W	L	D	L	L	W	W	W	L	L	W	L	L	D	W	W	D	L	L	W	L	L	W	D	L
Position	2	3	8	10	13	13	14	16	16	14	14	14	15	15	15	13	12	14	14	14	14	14	15	14	15	13	13	14	13	14	15	14	15	16

Updated to match(es) played on 27 May 2017. Source: Bundesliga
A = Away; H = Home; W = Win; D = Draw; L = Loss

==== Matches ====
27 August 2016 1	FC Augsburg	0–2	VfL Wolfsburg	Augsburg
15:30 CEST (UTC+2)	Kohr (yellow card) 66'	Report	Gerhardt (yellow card) 31'; Didavi 35'; Bruma (yellow card) 62'; Rodríguez 89'	Stadium: WWK ARENA; Attendance: 26,172; Referee: Sascha Stegemann

10 September 2016 2	VfL Wolfsburg	0–0	1. FC Köln	Wolfsburg
15:30 CEST (UTC+2)	Caligiuri (yellow card) 30'; Błaszczykowski (yellow card) 57'	Report	Lehmann (yellow card) 66'; Höger (yellow card) 66'; Bittencourt (yellow card) 73'	Stadium: VOLKSWAGEN ARENA; Attendance: 29,067; Referee: Guido Winkmann

17 September 2016 3	1899 Hoffenheim	0–0	VfL Wolfsburg	Sinsheim
15:30 CEST (UTC+2)	Wagner (yellow card) 20'; Rudy (yellow card) 78'	Report	Gerhardt (yellow card) 11'	Stadium: WIRSOL Rhein-Neckar-Arena; Attendance: 23,295; Referee: Günter Perl

20 September 2016 4	VfL Wolfsburg	1–5	Borussia Dortmund	Wolfsburg
20:00 CEST (UTC+2)	Arnold (yellow card) 13'; Błaszczykowski (yellow card) 25'; Didavi 53'	Report	Guerreiro 4'; Aubameyang 16', 62'; Dembélé 58'; Piszczek 73'	Stadium: VOLKSWAGEN ARENA; Attendance: 30,000; Referee: Daniel Siebert

24 September 2016 5	Werder Bremen	2–1	VfL Wolfsburg	Bremen
18:30 CEST (UTC+2)	Junuzović (yellow card) 61'; Thy 86'; Gebre Selassie 90+1'	Report	Bruma (yellow card) 26'; Seguin (yellow card) 40'; Horn (yellow card) 49'; Bauer 69' (o.g.)	Stadium: Weser-Stadion; Attendance: 40,153; Referee: Deniz Aytekin

2 October 2016 6	VfL Wolfsburg	0–0	Mainz 05	Wolfsburg
15:30 CEST (UTC+2)		Report		Stadium: VOLKSWAGEN ARENA; Attendance: 25,876; Referee: Benjamin Brand

16 October 2016 7	VfL Wolfsburg	0–1	RB Leipzig	Wolfsburg
17:30 CEST (UTC+2)	Casteels (yellow card) 17'; Arnold (yellow card) 90+3'	Report	Halstenberg (yellow card) 69'; Forsberg 70'	Stadium: VOLKSWAGEN ARENA; Attendance: 30,000; Referee: Sascha Stegemann

22 October 2016 8	Darmstadt 98	3–1	VfL Wolfsburg	Darmstadt
15:30 CEST (UTC+2)	Ben-Hatira 25'; Kleinheisler 68'; Sirigu 76'	Report	Bruma (red card) 23'; Gómez 60'; Schäfer (yellow card) 67'; Arnold (yellow card) 79'	Stadium: Jonathan-Heimes-Stadion am Böllenfalltor; Attendance: 15,300; Referee: Markus Schmidt

29 October 2016 9	VfL Wolfsburg	1–2	Bayer Leverkusen	Wolfsburg
15:30 CEST (UTC+2)	Arnold 37'; Brekalo (yellow card) 80'	Report	Mehmedi (yellow card) 59', (goal) 79'; Bender (yellow card) 65'; Wendell (yellow card) 71'; Jedvaj 83'	Stadium: VOLKSWAGEN ARENA; Attendance: 26,398; Referee: Tobias Stieler

5 November 2016 10	SC Freiburg	0–3	VfL Wolfsburg	Freiburg im Breisgau
15:30 CET (UTC+1)	Abrashi (yellow card) 24'; Günter (yellow card) 42' (red card) 85'; Söyüncü (yellow card) 65'	Report	Gómez 41', 53', (yellow card) 80'; Arnold (yellow card) 73'; Rodríguez 86' (pen.)	Stadium: Schwarzwald-Stadion; Attendance: 23,500; Referee: Felix Brych

19 November 2016 11	VfL Wolfsburg	0–1	Schalke 04	Wolfsburg
15:30 CET (UTC+1)	Bruma (yellow card) 38'; Seguin (yellow card) 69'	Report	Höwedes (yellow card) 77'; Goretzka 82'; Kolašinac (yellow card) 85'	Stadium: VOLKSWAGEN ARENA; Attendance: 30,000; Referee: Felix Zwayer

26 November 2016 12	FC Ingolstadt	1–1	VfL Wolfsburg	Ingolstadt
15:30 CET (UTC+1)	Jung 31'; Cohen (yellow card) 33'; Roger (yellow card) 52'	Report	Guilavogui (yellow card) 51'; Caligiuri 78'	Stadium: Audi Sportpark; Attendance: 13,521; Referee: Daniel Siebert

3 December 2016 13	VfL Wolfsburg	2–3	Hertha BSC	Wolfsburg
15:30 CET (UTC+1)	Mayoral 12'; Seguin 18', (yellow card) 76' (yellow-red card) 87'; Guilavogui (yellow card) 28'; Caligiuri (yellow card) 31'; Arnold (yellow card) 62'	Report	Plattenhardt 16', (yellow card) 59'; Esswein 69'; Kalou 90+1' (pen.); Schieber (yellow card) 90+2'	Stadium: VOLKSWAGEN ARENA; Attendance: 25,317; Referee: Jochen Drees

10 December 2016 14	Bayern Munich	5–0	VfL Wolfsburg	Munich
15:30 CET (UTC+1)	Robben 18'; Lewandowski 22', 58'; Thiago (yellow card) 25'; Müller 76'; Douglas Costa 86'	Report		Stadium: Allianz Arena; Attendance: 75,000; Referee: Sascha Stegemann

17 December 2016 15	VfL Wolfsburg	1–0	Eintracht Frankfurt	Wolfsburg
18:30 CET (UTC+1)	Luiz Gustavo (yellow card) 8'; Bruma 33'; Guilavogui (yellow card) 38'; Gómez (yellow card) 80'	Report	Rebić (yellow card) 23'; Huszti (yellow card) 34'; Mascarell (yellow card) 61'; Abraham (yellow card) 90'	Stadium: VOLKSWAGEN ARENA; Attendance: 26,967; Referee: Felix Brych

20 December 2016 16	Borussia Mönchengladbach	1–2	VfL Wolfsburg	Mönchengladbach
20:00 CET (UTC+1)	Stindl (yellow card) 23'; Hazard 52'	Report	Caligiuri 3'; Arnold (yellow card) 12'; Bruma (yellow card) 33'; Gómez 57'	Stadium: BORUSSIA-PARK; Attendance: 47,067; Referee: Robert Kampka

21 January 2017 17	VfL Wolfsburg	1–0	Hamburger SV	Wolfsburg
15:30 CET (UTC+1)	Benaglio (yellow card) 33'; Gómez 83'; Luiz Gustavo (yellow card) 85'	Report	Ekdal (yellow card) 28' (yellow-red card) 33'; Ostrzolek (yellow card) 37'	Stadium: VOLKSWAGEN ARENA; Attendance: 30,000; Referee: Felix Zwayer

28 January 2017 18	VfL Wolfsburg	1–2	FC Augsburg	Wolfsburg
15:30 CET (UTC+1)	Gómez 4'; Vieirinha (yellow card) 68'; Luiz Gustavo (yellow card) 89'	Report	Max (yellow card) 9'; Altıntop 25'; Kohr 69'; Koo (yellow card) 83'	Stadium: VOLKSWAGEN ARENA; Attendance: 24,811; Referee: Bastian Dankert

4 February 2017 19	1. FC Köln	1–0	VfL Wolfsburg	Cologne
15:30 CET (UTC+1)	Osako (yellow card) 34'; Clemens (yellow card) 43'; Olkowski (yellow card) 76'; Modeste 81' (pen.); Kessler (yellow card) 85'	Report	Bruma (yellow card) 58'; Vieirinha (yellow card) 67'; Guilavogui (yellow card) 85'	Stadium: RheinEnergieSTADION; Attendance: 49,400; Referee: Patrick Ittrich

12 February 2017 20	VfL Wolfsburg	2–1	1899 Hoffenheim	Wolfsburg
15:30 CET (UTC+1)	Rodríguez (yellow card) 14'; Bazoer (yellow card) 24'; Arnold 50'; Didavi 73'; Mallı (yellow card) 75'	Report	Zuber 26'; Vogt (yellow card) 87'; Hübner (yellow card) 87'	Stadium: VOLKSWAGEN ARENA; Attendance: 23,148; Referee: Daniel Siebert

18 February 2017 21	Borussia Dortmund	3–0	VfL Wolfsburg	Dortmund
15:30 CET (UTC+1)	Bruma 20' (o.g.); Piszczek 48'; Weigl (yellow card) 53'; Dembélé 59'; Schürrle (yellow card) 89'	Report	Bruma (yellow card) 89'	Stadium: SIGNAL IDUNA PARK; Attendance: 56,906; Referee: Günter Perl

24 February 2017 22	VfL Wolfsburg	1–2	Werder Bremen	Wolfsburg
20:30 CET (UTC+1)	Mayoral 19'; Arnold (yellow card) 86'	Report	Gnabry 10', 18'; Bartels (yellow card) 45+1'; Wiedwald (yellow card) 69'; Sané (yellow card) 90+3'	Stadium: VOLKSWAGEN ARENA; Attendance: 30,000; Referee: Wolfgang Stark

4 March 2017 23	Mainz 05	1–1	VfL Wolfsburg	Mainz
15:30 CET (UTC+1)	Córdoba 24'	Report	Gómez 20'	Stadium: OPEL ARENA; Attendance: 27,238; Referee: Benjamin Cortus

11 March 2017 24	RB Leipzig	0–1	VfL Wolfsburg	Leipzig
15:30 CET (UTC+1)	Schmitz (yellow card) 14'; Orban (yellow card) 19'; Keïta (yellow card) 33'	Report	Gómez 9', (yellow card) 78'; Luiz Gustavo (yellow card) 21'; Gerhardt (yellow card) 73'; Seguin (yellow card) 89'	Stadium: Red Bull Arena; Attendance: 42,558; Referee: Benjamin Brand

18 March 2017 25	VfL Wolfsburg	1–0	Darmstadt 98	Wolfsburg
15:30 CET (UTC+1)	Gómez 45+1', (yellow card) 62'; Knoche (yellow card) 62'	Report	Gondorf (yellow card) 58'; Sulu (yellow card) 68'; Banggaard (yellow card) 74'	Stadium: VOLKSWAGEN ARENA; Attendance: 28,104; Referee: Felix Brych

2 April 2017 26	Bayer Leverkusen	3–3	VfL Wolfsburg	Leverkusen
17:30 CEST (UTC+2)	Bellarabi 40'; Volland 65'; Aránguiz (yellow card) 81'; Havertz 89'	Report	Bazoer (yellow card) 39'; Gómez 80', 83', 87' (pen.); Luiz Gustavo (yellow card) 90'	Stadium: BayArena; Attendance: 28,675; Referee: Deniz Aytekin

5 April 2017 27	VfL Wolfsburg	0–1	SC Freiburg	Wolfsburg
20:00 CEST (UTC+2)		Report	Niederlechner (yellow card) 72', (goal) 78'	Stadium: VOLKSWAGEN ARENA; Attendance: 24,179; Referee: Guido Winkmann

8 April 2017 28	Schalke 04	4–1	VfL Wolfsburg	Gelsenkirchen
15:30 CEST (UTC+2)	Burgstaller 6', 77'; Goretzka 23'; Caligiuri 48'; Nastasić (yellow card) 58'	Report	Arnold (yellow card) 2'; Gómez 79' (pen.); Bazoer (yellow card) 86'	Stadium: VELTINS-Arena; Attendance: 61,298; Referee: Benjamin Brand

15 April 2017 29	VfL Wolfsburg	3–0	FC Ingolstadt	Wolfsburg
15:30 CEST (UTC+2)	Bazoer (yellow card) 11'; Knoche (yellow card) 36'; Suttner 45+1' (o.g.); Mallı 68'; Gómez 80'	Report	Suttner (yellow card) 13'; Matip (yellow card) 41'; Cohen (yellow card) 86'	Stadium: VOLKSWAGEN ARENA; Attendance: 26,374; Referee: Tobias Stieler

22 April 2017 30	Hertha BSC	1–0	VfL Wolfsburg	Berlin
15:30 CEST (UTC+2)	Ibišević 59'; Allan (yellow card) 81'; Darida (yellow card) 90'; Esswein (yellow card) 90+3'	Report	Arnold (yellow card) 39'; Guilavogui (yellow card) 53'; Luiz Gustavo (yellow card) 73'; Mayoral (yellow card) 75'; Gerhardt (yellow card) 90+1'	Stadium: Olympiastadion Berlin; Attendance: 42,521; Referee: Bastian Dankert

29 April 2017 31	VfL Wolfsburg	0–6	Bayern Munich	Wolfsburg
18:30 CEST (UTC+2)	Luiz Gustavo (yellow card) 19' (yellow-red card) 78'	Report	Alaba 19'; Lewandowski 36', 45'; Robben 66'; Müller 80'; Kimmich 85'	Stadium: VOLKSWAGEN ARENA; Attendance: 30,000; Referee: Felix Zwayer

6 May 2017 32	Eintracht Frankfurt	0–2	VfL Wolfsburg	Frankfurt
15:30 CEST (UTC+2)	Gaćinović (yellow card) 27'	Report	Didavi 48'; Gerhardt (yellow card) 59'; Gómez 63'; Casteels (yellow card) 73'	Stadium: Commerzbank-Arena; Attendance: 49,000; Referee: Manuel Gräfe

13 May 2017 33	VfL Wolfsburg	1–1	Borussia Mönchengladbach	Wolfsburg
15:30 CEST (UTC+2)	Bazoer (yellow card) 45'; Horn (yellow card) 49'; Gómez 58'; Osimhen (yellow card) 89'	Report	Vestergaard 24'; N. Schulz (yellow card) 53'	Stadium: VOLKSWAGEN ARENA; Attendance: 28,721; Referee: Christian Dingert

20 May 2017 34	Hamburger SV	2–1	VfL Wolfsburg	Hamburg
15:30 CEST (UTC+2)	Sakai (yellow card) 25'; Kostić 32', (yellow card) 88'; Papadopoulos (yellow card) 80'; Waldschmidt 88'; Gregoritsch (yellow card) 90+5'	Report	Knoche 23'; Guilavogui (yellow card) 36'; Vieirinha (yellow card) 59'; Casteels (yellow card) 90+2'	Stadium: Volksparkstadion; Attendance: 57,000; Referee: Manuel Gräfe

==== Relegation play-offs ====
25 May 2017 First leg	VfL Wolfsburg	1–0	Eintracht Braunschweig	Wolfsburg
20:30 CEST (UTC+2)	Gómez 35' (pen.); Guilavogui (yellow card) 52'; Luiz Gustavo (yellow card) 88'	Report	Reichel (yellow card) 14'; Valsvik (yellow card) 34'; Sauer (yellow card) 43'	Stadium: VOLKSWAGEN ARENA; Attendance: 29,100; Referee: Sascha Stegemann

29 May 2017 Second leg	Eintracht Braunschweig	0–1 (0–2 agg.)	VfL Wolfsburg	Braunschweig
20:30 CEST (UTC+2)	Sauer (yellow card) 10' (yellow-red card) 82'	Report	Gómez (yellow card) 36'; Vieirinha 49'; Didavi (yellow card) 75'	Stadium: Eintracht-Stadion; Attendance: 23,000; Referee: Tobias Stieler

=== DFB-Pokal ===
20 August 2016 First round	FSV Frankfurt	1–2	VfL Wolfsburg	Frankfurt
20:45 CEST (UTC+2)	Bahn (yellow card) 32'; Streker (yellow card) 35'; Schleusener 52', (yellow card) 78'; Barry (yellow card) 90+1'	Report	Schäfer 5' (o.g.); Dost 16'; Bruma (yellow card) 58'; Didavi (yellow card) 66'; Gerhardt (yellow card) 89'	Stadium: Frankfurter Volksbank Stadion; Attendance: 5,050; Referee: Wolfgang Stark

26 October 2016 Second round	1. FC Heidenheim	0–1	VfL Wolfsburg	Heidenheim
18:30 CEST (UTC+2)	Schnatterer (yellow card) 70'; Müller (yellow card) 86'	Report	Gómez 49'; Seguin (yellow card) 60'; Arnold (yellow card) 86'	Stadium: Voith-Arena; Attendance: 9,200; Referee: Benjamin Brand

7 February 2017 Round of 16	Bayern Munich	1–0	VfL Wolfsburg	Munich
20:45 CET (UTC+1)	Douglas Costa 18'; Robben (yellow card) 72'	Report	Luiz Gustavo (yellow card) 57'; Rodríguez (yellow card) 90+3'	Stadium: Allianz Arena; Attendance: 73,500; Referee: Jochen Drees

== Statistics ==
=== Appearances and goals ===
No.	Pos	Nat	Player	Total		Bundesliga		DFB-Pokal		Play-offs	
No.	Pos	Nat	Player	Apps	Goals	Apps	Goals	Apps	Goals	Apps	Goals
Goalkeepers
1	GK	(Switzerland) SUI	Diego Benaglio	15	0	14	0	1	0	0	0
20	GK	(Germany) GER	Max Grün	0	0	0	0	0	0	0	0
28	GK	(Belgium) BEL	Koen Casteels	24	0	20	0	2	0	2	0
36	GK	(Germany) GER	Phillip Menzel	0	0	0	0	0	0	0	0
Defenders
2	DF	(Germany) GER	Philipp Wollscheid	9	0	6+1	0	0	0	2	0
4	DF	(Germany) GER	Marcel Schäfer	5	0	2+2	0	0+1	0	0	0
5	DF	(Netherlands) NED	Jeffrey Bruma	22	1	20	1	2	0	0	0
15	DF	(Germany) GER	Christian Träsch	14	0	7+4	0	0+1	0	2	0
21	DF	(Germany) GER	Jannes Horn	13	0	10+3	0	0	0	0	0
24	DF	(Germany) GER	Sebastian Jung	4	0	4	0	0	0	0	0
31	DF	(Germany) GER	Robin Knoche	27	1	21+2	1	1+1	0	2	0
34	DF	(Switzerland) SUI	Ricardo Rodríguez	26	2	23	2	3	0	0	0
40	DF	(Germany) GER	Robin Ziegele	0	0	0	0	0	0	0	0
41	DF	(Germany) GER	Hendrik Hansen	1	0	0+1	0	0	0	0	0
Midfielders
6	MF	(Netherlands) NED	Riechedly Bazoer	13	0	12	0	1	0	0	0
8	MF	(Portugal) POR	Vieirinha	25	1	13+8	0	2	0	1+1	1
10	MF	(Turkey) TUR	Yunus Mallı	19	1	13+3	1	0+1	0	2	0
11	MF	(Germany) GER	Daniel Didavi	22	4	11+7	4	1+1	0	2	0
13	MF	(Germany) GER	Yannick Gerhardt	32	0	25+2	0	3	0	2	0
14	MF	(Poland) POL	Jakub Błaszczykowski	30	0	20+8	0	2	0	0	0
22	MF	(Brazil) BRA	Luiz Gustavo	32	0	26+1	0	3	0	2	0
23	MF	(France) FRA	Josuha Guilavogui	21	0	17+2	0	0	0	2	0
25	MF	(Iran) IRN	Ashkan Dejagah	2	0	0	0	0	0	0+2	0
26	MF	(Germany) GER	Justin Möbius	3	0	0+2	0	0+1	0	0	0
27	MF	(Germany) GER	Maximilian Arnold	36	2	28+4	2	2	0	0+2	0
29	MF	(Germany) GER	Amara Condé	0	0	0	0	0	0	0	0
30	MF	(Germany) GER	Paul Seguin	24	1	15+7	1	2	0	0	0
38	MF	(Belgium) BEL	Ismail Azzaoui	0	0	0	0	0	0	0	0
Forwards
9	FW	(France) FRA	Paul-Georges Ntep	12	0	5+5	0	1	0	1	0
17	FW	(Spain) ESP	Borja Mayoral	21	2	3+16	2	1+1	0	0	0
18	FW	(Nigeria) NGA	Victor Osimhen	3	0	0+2	0	0	0	0+1	0
33	FW	(Germany) GER	Mario Gómez	37	18	32+1	16	1+1	1	2	1
Players transferred out during the season
6	DF	(Peru) PER	Carlos Ascues	1	0	0	0	1	0	0	0
7	MF	(Italy) ITA	Daniel Caligiuri	16	2	12+2	2	2	0	0	0
10	MF	(Germany) GER	Julian Draxler	14	0	12+1	0	1	0	0	0
12	FW	(Netherlands) NED	Bas Dost	2	1	1	0	1	1	0	0
16	FW	(Brazil) BRA	Bruno Henrique	7	0	1+5	0	0+1	0	0	0
25	FW	(Croatia) CRO	Josip Brekalo	4	0	0+4	0	0	0	0	0
35	FW	(Germany) GER	Anton Donkor	0	0	0	0	0	0	0	0

Last updated: 29 May 2017
Source: Competitions

=== Goalscorers ===
Rank	No.	Pos	Nat	Name	Bundesliga	DFB-Pokal	Play-offs	Total
1	33	FW	(Germany)	Mario Gómez	16	1	1	18
2	11	MF	(Germany)	Daniel Didavi	4	0	0	4
3	7	MF	(Italy)	Daniel Caligiuri	2	0	0	2
3	17	FW	(Spain)	Borja Mayoral	2	0	0	2
3	27	MF	(Germany)	Maximilian Arnold	2	0	0	2
3	34	DF	(Switzerland)	Ricardo Rodríguez	2	0	0	2
7	5	DF	(Netherlands)	Jeffrey Bruma	1	0	0	1
7	8	MF	(Portugal)	Vieirinha	0	0	1	1
7	10	MF	(Turkey)	Yunus Mallı	1	0	0	1
7	12	FW	(Netherlands)	Bas Dost	0	1	0	1
7	30	MF	(Germany)	Paul Seguin	1	0	0	1
7	31	DF	(Germany)	Robin Knoche	1	0	0	1
Own goal					2	1	0	3
Totals					34	3	2	39

Last updated: 29 May 2017

=== Clean sheets ===
Rank	No.	Pos	Nat	Name	Bundesliga	DFB-Pokal	Play-offs	Total
1	28	GK	(Belgium)	Koen Casteels	8	0	2	10
2	1	GK	(Switzerland)	Diego Benaglio	3	1	0	4
Totals					11	1	2	14

Last updated: 29 May 2017

=== Disciplinary record ===
No.	Pos	Nat	Player	Bundesliga			DFB-Pokal			Play-offs			Total		
No.	Pos	Nat	Player	Booked	(yellow card) (yellow-red card)	Sent off (straight red)	Booked	(yellow card) (yellow-red card)	Sent off (straight red)	Booked	(yellow card) (yellow-red card)	Sent off (straight red)	Booked	(yellow card) (yellow-red card)	Sent off (straight red)
1	GK	(Switzerland)	Diego Benaglio	1	0	0	0	0	0	0	0	0	1	0	0
4	DF	(Germany)	Marcel Schäfer	1	0	0	0	0	0	0	0	0	1	0	0
5	DF	(Netherlands)	Jeffrey Bruma	6	0	1	1	0	0	0	0	0	7	0	1
6	MF	(Netherlands)	Riechedly Bazoer	5	0	0	0	0	0	0	0	0	5	0	0
7	MF	(Italy)	Daniel Caligiuri	2	0	0	0	0	0	0	0	0	2	0	0
8	MF	(Portugal)	Vieirinha	3	0	0	0	0	0	0	0	0	3	0	0
10	MF	(Turkey)	Yunus Mallı	1	0	0	0	0	0	0	0	0	1	0	0
11	MF	(Germany)	Daniel Didavi	0	0	0	1	0	0	1	0	0	2	0	0
13	MF	(Germany)	Yannick Gerhardt	5	0	0	1	0	0	0	0	0	6	0	0
14	MF	(Poland)	Jakub Błaszczykowski	2	0	0	0	0	0	0	0	0	2	0	0
17	FW	(Spain)	Borja Mayoral	1	0	0	0	0	0	0	0	0	1	0	0
21	DF	(Germany)	Jannes Horn	2	0	0	0	0	0	0	0	0	2	0	0
22	MF	(Brazil)	Luiz Gustavo	6	1	0	1	0	0	1	0	0	8	1	0
23	MF	(France)	Josuha Guilavogui	6	0	0	0	0	0	1	0	0	7	0	0
25	FW	(Croatia)	Josip Brekalo	1	0	0	0	0	0	0	0	0	1	0	0
27	MF	(Germany)	Maximilian Arnold	9	0	0	1	0	0	0	0	0	10	0	0
28	GK	(Belgium)	Koen Casteels	3	0	0	0	0	0	0	0	0	3	0	0
30	MF	(Germany)	Paul Seguin	3	1	0	1	0	0	0	0	0	4	1	0
31	DF	(Germany)	Robin Knoche	2	0	0	0	0	0	0	0	0	2	0	0
33	FW	(Germany)	Mario Gómez	4	0	0	0	0	0	1	0	0	5	0	0
34	DF	(Switzerland)	Ricardo Rodríguez	1	0	0	1	0	0	0	0	0	2	0	0
Totals				64	2	1	7	0	0	4	0	0	75	2	1

Last updated: 29 May 2017
