= 2018–19 Regionalliga =

11th season of the Regionalliga

Regionalliga
- Season: 2018–19
- Champions: VfL Wolfsburg II (Nord); Chemnitzer FC (Nordost); Viktoria Köln (West); Waldhof Mannheim (Südwest); Bayern Munich II (Bayern)
- Promoted: Chemnitzer FC; Viktoria Köln; Waldhof Mannheim; Bayern Munich II
- Relegated: Germania Egestorf/Langreder; VfL Oldenburg; Lupo Martini Wolfsburg; Oberlausitz Neugersdorf; Budissa Bautzen; 1. FC Kaan-Marienborn; SV Straelen; SC Wiedenbrück; TV Herkenrath; VfB Stuttgart II; Wormatia Worms; Eintracht Stadtallendorf; Hessen Dreieich; FC Ingolstadt II; FC Pipinsried

The 2018–19 Regionalliga was the eleventh season of the Regionalliga, the seventh under the new format, as the fourth tier of the German football league system.

== Format ==
A new promotion format was used this season. The champions of the Regionalliga Nordost and Südwest were promoted directly to the 2019–20 3. Liga, as well as the champion of a third league determined in a draw. The other two champions participated in the promotion play-offs to determine the fourth promoted team.

The draw to determine which league got the final direct promotion spot (Bayern, Nord or West), along with the pairing order of the promotion play-offs took place on 27 April 2018.

== Regionalliga Nord ==
18 teams from the states of Bremen, Hamburg, Lower Saxony and Schleswig-Holstein competed in the seventh season of the reformed Regionalliga Nord. Werder Bremen II was relegated from the 2017–18 3. Liga. Lupo Martini Wolfsburg and VfL Oldenburg were promoted from the 2017–18 Oberliga Niedersachsen and Holstein Kiel II was promoted from the 2017–18 Oberliga Schleswig-Holstein.

The relegation process was reformed for this season. The regular scenario saw the bottom three clubs relegated. They were replaced by the champions of the Oberliga Niedersachsen, while the champions of the Bremen-Liga, Oberliga Hamburg and Oberliga Schleswig-Holstein played a round-robin play-off for the remaining two places. The fifteenth-placed club played off against the Oberliga Niedersachsen runners-up for a final place in the Regionalliga. This scenario varied depending on promotion to and relegation from the 3. Liga.

Pos	Team	Pld	W	D	L	GF	GA	GD	Pts	Qualification or relegation
1	VfL Wolfsburg II (C)	34	23	8	3	86	28	+58	77	Qualification for promotion play-offs
2	VfB Lübeck	34	22	8	4	70	23	+47	74	
3	Werder Bremen II	34	18	7	9	54	38	+16	61	
4	Weiche Flensburg	34	16	11	7	65	41	+24	59	
5	SV Drochtersen/Assel	34	14	10	10	44	43	+1	52	
6	Hannover 96 II	34	14	9	11	46	33	+13	51	
7	Hamburger SV II	34	13	10	11	46	42	+4	49	
8	Schwarz-Weiß Rehden	34	13	8	13	42	46	−4	47	
9	VfB Oldenburg	34	11	12	11	49	44	+5	45	
10	Holstein Kiel II	34	12	9	13	51	51	0	45	
11	TSV Havelse	34	13	5	16	39	55	−16	44	
12	SSV Jeddeloh	34	12	7	15	47	65	−18	43	
13	Eintracht Norderstedt	34	11	8	15	51	66	−15	41	
14	FC St. Pauli II	34	12	4	18	41	47	−6	40	
15	Lüneburger SK Hansa (O)	34	11	7	16	40	58	−18	40	Qualification for relegation play-offs
16	Germania Egestorf/Langreder (R)	34	11	3	20	36	57	−21	36	Relegation to Oberliga
17	VfL Oldenburg (R)	34	7	4	23	37	79	−42	25	Relegation to Oberliga
18	Lupo Martini Wolfsburg (R)	34	4	8	22	31	61	−30	20	Relegation to Oberliga

Source: kicker.de
Rules for classification: 1) Points; 2) Goal difference; 3) Goals scored
(C) Champions; (O) Play-off winners; (R) Relegated

=== Relegation play-offs ===
Team 1	Agg.	Team 2	1st leg	2nd leg
Eintracht Northeim	0–3	Lüneburger SK Hansa	0–1	0–2

== Regionalliga Nordost ==
18 teams from the states of Berlin, Brandenburg, Mecklenburg-Vorpommern, Saxony, Saxony-Anhalt and Thuringia competed in the seventh season of the reformed Regionalliga Nordost. Chemnitzer FC and Rot-Weiß Erfurt were relegated from the 2017–18 3. Liga. Optik Rathenow was promoted from the 2017–18 NOFV-Oberliga Nord and Bischofswerdaer FV was promoted from the 2017–18 NOFV-Oberliga Süd.

Pos	Team	Pld	W	D	L	GF	GA	GD	Pts	Promotion or relegation
1	Chemnitzer FC (C, P)	34	25	2	7	82	36	+46	77	Promotion to 3. Liga
2	Berliner AK 07	34	21	7	6	64	36	+28	70	
3	Wacker Nordhausen	34	19	7	8	59	38	+21	64	
4	Hertha BSC II	34	16	9	9	60	43	+17	57	
5	Rot-Weiß Erfurt	34	15	9	10	57	42	+15	54	
6	Lokomotive Leipzig	34	14	8	12	51	41	+10	50	
7	SV Babelsberg	34	13	7	14	53	44	+9	46	
8	Germania Halberstadt	34	12	10	12	46	38	+8	46	
9	VfB Auerbach	34	13	7	14	47	53	−6	46	
10	ZFC Meuselwitz	34	13	5	16	52	55	−3	44	
11	Viktoria Berlin (Note: Viktoria Berlin were deducted nine points due to filing for insolvency.)	34	14	10	10	50	38	+12	43	
12	BFC Dynamo	34	12	6	16	38	61	−23	42	
13	Union Fürstenwalde	34	10	10	14	43	60	−17	40	
14	VSG Altglienicke	34	9	12	13	54	59	−5	39	
15	Oberlausitz Neugersdorf (Note: Oberlausitz Neugersdorf were voluntarily relegated to the Oberliga, sparing Optik Rathenow from relegation.) (R)	34	10	7	17	40	64	−24	37	Relegation to Oberliga
16	Bischofswerdaer FV	34	10	4	20	29	58	−29	34	
17	Optik Rathenow	34	8	4	22	36	65	−29	28	
18	Budissa Bautzen (R)	34	6	8	20	21	51	−30	26	Relegation to Oberliga

Source: kicker.de
Rules for classification: 1) Points; 2) Goal difference; 3) Goals scored
(C) Champions; (P) Promoted; (R) Relegated

== Regionalliga West ==
18 teams from North Rhine-Westphalia competed in the seventh season of the reformed Regionalliga West. TV Herkenrath was promoted from the 2017–18 Mittelrheinliga, SV Straelen was promoted from the 2017–18 Oberliga Niederrhein and SV Lippstadt and 1. FC Kaan-Marienborn were promoted from the 2017–18 Oberliga Westfalen.

Pos	Team	Pld	W	D	L	GF	GA	GD	Pts	Promotion, qualification or relegation
1	Viktoria Köln (C, P)	34	19	10	5	62	30	+32	67	Promotion to 3. Liga
2	Rot-Weiß Oberhausen	34	18	10	6	58	41	+17	64	
3	SV Rödinghausen	34	19	6	9	58	29	+29	63	
4	Borussia Mönchengladbach II	34	15	12	7	47	38	+9	57	
5	Borussia Dortmund II	34	16	8	10	62	36	+26	56	
6	Alemannia Aachen	34	13	10	11	48	39	+9	49	
7	SC Verl (Note: SC Verl qualified for the DFB-Pokal play-off as the second-best Westphalian team as the best-placed team, SV Rödinghausen, already qualified for the 2019–20 DFB-Pokal by winning the Westphalian Cup.)	34	11	13	10	51	46	+5	46	Qualification for DFB-Pokal play-off
8	Rot-Weiss Essen	34	13	7	14	42	40	+2	46	
9	1. FC Köln II	34	12	9	13	54	46	+8	45	
10	Wuppertaler SV	34	12	8	14	45	49	−4	44	
11	SG Wattenscheid	34	11	10	13	44	44	0	43	
12	Fortuna Düsseldorf II	34	11	9	14	47	62	−15	42	
13	SV Lippstadt	34	11	8	15	36	48	−12	41	
14	Bonner SC	34	11	7	16	42	51	−9	40	
15	1. FC Kaan-Marienborn (R)	34	9	12	13	50	54	−4	39	Relegation to Oberliga
16	SV Straelen (R)	34	9	12	13	36	62	−26	39	Relegation to Oberliga
17	SC Wiedenbrück (R)	34	9	11	14	42	52	−10	38	Relegation to Oberliga
18	TV Herkenrath (R)	34	3	6	25	34	91	−57	15	Relegation to Oberliga

Source: kicker.de
Rules for classification: 1) Points; 2) Goal difference; 3) Goals scored
(C) Champions; (P) Promoted; (R) Relegated

=== Westphalian DFB-Pokal play-off ===
As the Westphalian Football and Athletics Association is one of three regional associations with the most participating teams in their league competitions, they are allowed to enter a second team for the 2019–20 DFB-Pokal (in addition to the Westphalian Cup winners). A play-off took place between the best-placed eligible (non-reserve) Westphalian team of the Regionalliga West and the best-placed eligible team of the Oberliga Westfalen, with the winners qualifying for the DFB-Pokal.

30 May 2019
15:00 CEST

TuS Haltern	1–3	SC Verl
Steinfeldt 72'	Report	Yıldırım 38', 73'; Haeder 63'

Stauseekampfbahn, Haltern am See
Attendance: 1,274
Referee: Florian Exner

== Regionalliga Südwest ==
18 teams from Baden-Württemberg, Hesse, Rhineland-Palatinate and Saarland competed in the seventh season of the Regionalliga Südwest. FC 08 Homburg and FK Pirmasens were promoted from the 2017–18 Oberliga Rheinland-Pfalz/Saar, TSG Balingen was promoted from the 2017–18 Oberliga Baden-Württemberg and Hessen Dreieich was promoted from the 2017–18 Hessenliga.

Pos	Team	Pld	W	D	L	GF	GA	GD	Pts	Promotion or relegation
1	Waldhof Mannheim (C, P)	34	28	4	2	88	32	+56	88	Promotion to 3. Liga
2	1. FC Saarbrücken	34	20	7	7	77	35	+42	67	
3	FC 08 Homburg	34	19	7	8	54	30	+24	64	
4	SV Elversberg	34	19	3	12	61	40	+21	60	
5	Kickers Offenbach	34	16	11	7	61	34	+27	59	
6	SSV Ulm	34	17	6	11	50	43	+7	57	
7	SC Freiburg II	34	15	10	9	50	37	+13	55	
8	TSV Steinbach Haiger	34	14	9	11	46	44	+2	51	
9	FK Pirmasens	34	12	7	15	36	60	−24	43	
10	1899 Hoffenheim II	34	11	8	15	55	62	−7	41	
11	TSG Balingen	34	9	14	11	39	49	−10	41	
12	FSV Frankfurt	34	11	7	16	42	56	−14	40	
13	Astoria Walldorf	34	10	9	15	42	53	−11	39	
14	Mainz 05 II	34	8	9	17	39	48	−9	33	
15	VfB Stuttgart II (R)	34	7	10	17	35	56	−21	31	Relegation to Oberliga
16	Wormatia Worms (Note: Wormatia Worms was deducted one point due to riots during the match against FK Pirmasens.) (R)	34	8	7	19	34	58	−24	30	Relegation to Oberliga
17	Eintracht Stadtallendorf (R)	34	8	5	21	37	63	−26	29	Relegation to Oberliga
18	Hessen Dreieich (R)	34	4	7	23	29	75	−46	19	Relegation to Oberliga

Source: kicker.de
Rules for classification: 1) Points; 2) Goal difference; 3) Goals scored
(C) Champions; (P) Promoted; (R) Relegated

== Regionalliga Bayern ==
18 teams from Bavaria competed in the seventh season of the Regionalliga Bayern. SV Heimstetten was promoted from the 2017–18 Bayernliga Süd and Viktoria Aschaffenburg was promoted from the 2017–18 Bayernliga Nord.

Pos	Team	Pld	W	D	L	GF	GA	GD	Pts	Qualification or relegation
1	Bayern Munich II (Note: Bayern Munich II is ineligible for qualification for the DFB-Pokal as they are a reserve team.) (C, O, P)	34	22	7	5	72	30	+42	73	Qualification for promotion play-offs
2	VfB Eichstätt	34	19	9	6	69	44	+25	66	Qualification for DFB-Pokal
3	Wacker Burghausen	34	16	8	10	50	41	+9	56	
4	1. FC Schweinfurt	34	14	13	7	55	43	+12	55	
5	1. FC Nürnberg II	34	15	10	9	50	38	+12	55	
6	FC Memmingen	34	13	9	12	55	57	−2	48	
7	FV Illertissen	34	14	5	15	58	63	−5	47	
8	TSV Buchbach	34	13	7	14	52	48	+4	46	
9	SpVgg Bayreuth	34	12	9	13	51	47	+4	45	
10	Viktoria Aschaffenburg	34	9	14	11	47	54	−7	41	
11	VfR Garching	34	10	11	13	46	53	−7	41	
12	SV Schalding-Heining	34	11	8	15	41	53	−12	41	
13	FC Augsburg II	34	11	6	17	43	50	−7	39	
14	Greuther Fürth II	34	10	8	16	45	49	−4	38	
15	1860 Rosenheim (O)	34	10	7	17	37	58	−21	37	Qualification for relegation play-offs
16	SV Heimstetten (O)	34	10	5	19	48	73	−25	35	Qualification for relegation play-offs
17	FC Pipinsried (R)	34	8	9	17	46	69	−23	33	Relegation to Bayernliga
18	FC Ingolstadt II (Note: Due to the relegation of FC Ingolstadt to the 3. Liga, FC Ingolstadt II were moved to 18th place and forcibly relegated, as reserve teams of clubs in the 3. Liga must be in the fifth-division Oberliga or below. FC Ingolstadt II previously finished the season in 9th place.) (R)	34	12	9	13	53	48	+5	45	Relegation to Bayernliga

Source: kicker.de
Rules for classification: 1) Points; 2) Goal difference; 3) Goals scored
(C) Champions; (O) Play-off winners; (P) Promoted; (R) Relegated

=== Relegation play-offs ===
==== First round ====
Team 1	Agg.	Team 2	1st leg	2nd leg
DJK Gebenbach	1–2	1860 Rosenheim	0–1	1–1
TSV Rain am Lech	2–3	SV Heimstetten	1–1	1–2

==== Second round ====
Since Bayern Munich II were promoted to the 3. Liga, the losers from the first round played for another Regionalliga spot.

Team 1	Agg.	Team 2	1st leg	2nd leg
DJK Gebenbach	1–2	TSV Rain am Lech	0–2	1–0

== Promotion play-offs ==
The participants and pairing order for the 2018–19 promotion play-offs was determined by a draw held on 27 April 2018. The first leg was played on 22 May 2019 and the second leg on 26 May.

Team 1	Agg.	Team 2	1st leg	2nd leg
VfL Wolfsburg II	4–5	Bayern Munich II	3–1	1–4

All times Central European Summer Time (UTC+2)

22 May 2019
19:00

VfL Wolfsburg II	3–1	Bayern Munich II
Rizzi 6'; Hanslik 33', 45+4'	Report	Ziegele 44' (o.g.)

AOK-Stadion, Wolfsburg
Attendance: 4,552
Referee: Thorben Siewer
26 May 2019
16:00

Bayern Munich II	4–1	VfL Wolfsburg II
Rochelt 33'; Mai 42'; Wriedt 49', 65'	Report	Hanslik 8'

Städtisches Stadion an der Grünwalder Straße, Munich
Attendance: 7,283
Referee: Lasse Koslowski

Bayern Munich II won 5–4 on aggregate.
