= 2019–20 TSG 1899 Hoffenheim season =

Hoffenheim
2019–20 season
- Chairman: Peter Hofmann
- Head coach: Alfred Schreuder (until 9 June); Matthias Kaltenbach (interim, from 9 June)
- Stadium: Wirsol Rhein-Neckar-Arena
- Bundesliga: 6th
- DFB-Pokal: Round of 16
- Top goalscorer: League: Andrej Kramarić (12 goals); All: Andrej Kramarić (12 goals)
Home colours	Away colours	Third colours

The 2019–20 TSG 1899 Hoffenheim season was the club's 121st season in existence and the club's 12th consecutive season in the top flight of German football. In addition to the domestic league, TSG 1899 Hoffenheim participated in that season's edition of the DFB-Pokal. The season covered the period from 1 July 2019 to 30 June 2020.

== Players ==
=== First-team squad ===
As of 17 January 2020

Note: Flags indicate national team as defined under FIFA eligibility rules; some limited exceptions apply. Players may hold more than one non-FIFA nationality.

No.	Pos.	Nation	Player
1	GK	GER	Oliver Baumann (vice-captain)
2	DF	NED	Joshua Brenet
3	DF	CZE	Pavel Kadeřábek
4	DF	BIH	Ermin Bičakčić
5	DF	GRE	Kostas Stafylidis
6	MF	NOR	Håvard Nordtveit
8	MF	GER	Dennis Geiger
9	FW	TOG	Ihlas Bebou
10	FW	ISR	Mu'nas Dabbur
11	MF	AUT	Florian Grillitsch
12	GK	GER	Philipp Pentke
14	MF	AUT	Christoph Baumgartner
16	MF	GER	Sebastian Rudy (on loan from Schalke 04)
17	MF	SUI	Steven Zuber

No.	Pos.	Nation	Player
18	MF	MLI	Diadie Samassékou
19	FW	ALG	Ishak Belfodil
21	DF	GER	Benjamin Hübner (captain)
23	FW	ARM	Sargis Adamyan
25	DF	GER	Kevin Akpoguma
27	FW	CRO	Andrej Kramarić
28	GK	GER	Michael Esser
29	FW	DEN	Robert Skov
31	DF	BRA	Lucas Ribeiro
33	GK	GER	Alexander Stolz
35	FW	GER	Maximilian Beier
38	DF	AUT	Stefan Posch
41	MF	ISR	Ilay Elmkies
—	MF	BRA	Felipe Pires

=== Players out on loan ===
Note: Flags indicate national team as defined under FIFA eligibility rules; some limited exceptions apply. Players may hold more than one non-FIFA nationality.

No.	Pos.	Nation	Player
—	GK	SUI	Gregor Kobel (at VfB Stuttgart until 30 June 2020)
—	DF	GER	Alfons Amade (at Eintracht Braunschweig until 30 June 2020)
—	DF	NED	Justin Hoogma (at FC Utrecht until 30 June 2020)
—	DF	GHA	Kasim Nuhu (at Fortuna Düsseldorf until 30 June 2020)
—	MF	BRA	Bruno Nazário (at Botafogo until 31 December 2020)

No.	Pos.	Nation	Player
—	MF	GER	Kevin Vogt (at Werder Bremen until 30 June 2020)
—	GK	SLO	Domen Gril (at NK Bravo until 30 June 2020)
—	MF	GER	Leonardo Bittencourt (at Werder Bremen until 30 June 2020)
—	FW	GER	David Otto (at Heidenheim until 30 June 2020)

== Transfers ==
=== Transfers in ===
#	Position	Player	Transferred from	Fee	Date	Source
23	FW	(Armenia) Sargis Adamyan	(Germany) Jahn Regensburg	€1,500,000	14 May 2019	
5	DF	(Greece) Kostas Stafylidis	(Germany) FC Augsburg	Free	15 May 2019	
9	FW	(Togo) Ihlas Bebou	(Germany) Hannover 96	€8,500,000	16 May 2019	
12	GK	(Germany) Philipp Pentke	(Germany) Jahn Regensburg	Free	1 July 2019	
29	FW	(Denmark) Robert Skov	(Denmark) FC Copenhagen	€10,000,000	29 July 2019	
18	MF	(Mali) Diadie Samassékou	(Austria) RB Salzburg	€12,000,000	15 August 2019	
10	FW	(Israel) Mu'nas Dabbur	(Spain) Sevilla	€12,000,000	7 January 2020	
28	GK	(Germany) Michael Esser	(Germany) Hannover 96	Free	14 January 2020	
7	FW	(Denmark) Jacob Bruun Larsen	(Germany) Borussia Dortmund	€9,000,000	31 January 2020	

==== Loans in ====
#	Position	Player	Loaned from	Date	Loan expires	Source
16	MF	(Germany) Sebastian Rudy	(Germany) Schalke 04	31 July 2018	30 June 2020	
37	FW	(Netherlands) Jürgen Locadia	(England) Brighton & Hove Albion	29 August 2019	31 January 2020	

=== Transfers out ===
#	Position	Player	Transferred to	Fee	Date	Source
10	MF	(Germany) Kerem Demirbay	(Germany) Bayer Leverkusen	€32,000,000	9 May 2019	
16	DF	(Germany) Nico Schulz	(Germany) Borussia Dortmund	€25,500,000	22 May 2019	
	FW	(Croatia) Antonio Čolak	(Croatia) Rijeka	€850,000	22 June 2019	
37	FW	(Germany) Robin Hack	(Germany) 1. FC Nürnberg	€500,000	1 July 2019	
34	FW	(Brazil) Joelinton	(England) Newcastle United	€44,000,000	23 July 2019	
18	MF	(Germany) Nadiem Amiri	(Germany) Bayer Leverkusen	€9,000,000	30 July 2019	
28	FW	(Hungary) Ádám Szalai	(Germany) Mainz 05	Free	27 August 2019	
32	FW	(Italy) Vincenzo Grifo	(Germany) SC Freiburg	€7,000,000	2 September 2019	
7	MF	(Germany) Lukas Rupp	(England) Norwich City	€500,000	13 January 2020	
20	MF	(Austria) Robert Žulj	(Germany) VfL Bochum	Undisclosed	15 January 2020	
30	FW	(Germany) Philipp Ochs	(Germany) Hannover 96	Free	31 January 2020	

==== Loans out ====
#	Position	Player	Loaned to	Date	Loan expires	Source
	FW	(Brazil) Bruno Nazário	(Brazil) Athletico Paranaense	16 July 2018	31 December 2019	
	GK	(Switzerland) Gregor Kobel	(Germany) VfB Stuttgart	1 July 2019	30 June 2020	
26	FW	(Germany) David Otto	(Germany) 1. FC Heidenheim	1 July 2019	30 June 2020	
23	FW	(Brazil) Felipe Pires	(Brazil) Fortaleza	22 July 2019	31 December 2019	
24	DF	(Netherlands) Justin Hoogma	(Netherlands) FC Utrecht	30 July 2019	30 June 2020	
15	DF	(Ghana) Kasim Nuhu	(Germany) Fortuna Düsseldorf	8 August 2019	30 June 2020	
13	MF	(Germany) Leonardo Bittencourt	(Germany) Werder Bremen	2 September 2019	30 June 2020	
22	MF	(Germany) Kevin Vogt	(Germany) Werder Bremen	12 January 2020	30 June 2020	
	FW	(Brazil) Bruno Nazário	(Brazil) Botafogo	17 January 2020	31 December 2020	
2	DF	(Netherlands) Joshua Brenet	(Netherlands) Vitesse	31 January 2020	30 June 2020	

== Pre-season and friendlies ==
Win Draw Loss

13 July 2019 Friendly	1899 Hoffenheim	3–0	Eintracht Braunschweig	Sattelbach, Germany
18:00 CEST (UTC+2)	Kramarić 33'; Kadeřábek 50'; Grifo 81'	Report		Stadium: Sportanlage Sattelbach

17 July 2019 Friendly	1899 Hoffenheim	3–2	Jahn Regensburg	Häuselgrundweg, Germany
17:00 CEST (UTC+2)	Hübner 51'; Akpoguma 90'; Stafylidis 105'	Report	Grüttner 2', 34'	Stadium: Sportanlage Häuselgrund

25 July 2019 Friendly	1899 Hoffenheim	0–0	Hellas Verona	Bad Wimsbach, Austria
17:00 CEST (UTC+2)		Report		Stadium: Hofmaninger Stadion; Referee: Stefan Stangl (Austria)

25 July 2019 Friendly	1899 Hoffenheim	3–3	Trabzonspor	Bad Wimsbach, Austria
19:05 CEST (UTC+2)	Stafylidis (yellow card) 37'; Szalai 42', 49'; Amiri 45+1'	Report	João Pereira (yellow card) 15'; Sosa (yellow card) 15'; Yazıcı 20', 26'; Sari 85'	Stadium: Hofmaninger Stadion

3 August 2019 Friendly	1899 Hoffenheim	1–2	Sevilla	Hoffenheim, Germany
15:30 CEST (UTC+2)	Grifo 29' (pen.)	Report	Munir 39'; Banega 50'	Stadium: Wirsol Rhein-Neckar-Arena

4 August 2019 Friendly	1899 Hoffenheim	0–4	Sevilla	Hoffenheim, Germany
13:30 CEST (UTC+2)			Nolito 16', 28', 49'; Dabbur 60'	Stadium: Dietmar Hopp Stadion

8 January 2020 Friendly	1899 Hoffenheim	2–3	Feyenoord	Marbella, Spain
15:30 CET (UTC+1)	Baumgartner 30'; Rudy 76'	Report	Narsingh 79', 83'; Toornstra 89'	Stadium: Marbella Football Center

9 January 2020 Friendly	1899 Hoffenheim	1–2	ADO Den Haag	Marbella, Spain
15:30 CET (UTC+1)	Locadia 16'	Report	Necid 62' (pen.); Summerville 89'	Stadium: Campo La Quinta

== Competitions ==
Win Draw Loss

=== Overview ===
Competition	First match	Last match	Starting round	Final position	Record							
Competition	First match	Last match	Starting round	Final position	Pld	W	D	L	GF	GA	GD	Win %
Bundesliga	17 August 2019	27 June 2020	Matchday 1	6th	34	15	7	12	53	53	+0	44.12
DFB-Pokal	10 August 2019	5 February 2020	First round	Round of 16	3	1	1	1	8	7	+1	33.33
Total					37	16	8	13	61	60	+1	43.24

Last updated: 27 June 2020
Source: Soccerway

=== Bundesliga ===
==== League table ====
Pos	Team	Pld	W	D	L	GF	GA	GD	Pts	Qualification or relegation
4	Borussia Mönchengladbach	34	20	5	9	66	40	+26	65	Qualification for the Champions League group stage
5	Bayer Leverkusen	34	19	6	9	61	44	+17	63	Qualification for the Europa League group stage (Note: Since the winners of the 2019–20 DFB-Pokal, Bayern Munich, qualified for the Champions League based on league position, the Europa League group stage spot was passed to the sixth-placed team, and the Europa League second qualifying round spot was passed to the seventh-placed team.)
6	1899 Hoffenheim	34	15	7	12	53	53	0	52	Qualification for the Europa League group stage
7	VfL Wolfsburg	34	13	10	11	48	46	+2	49	Qualification for the Europa League second qualifying round
8	SC Freiburg	34	13	9	12	48	47	+1	48	

Source: DFB
Rules for classification: 1) Points; 2) Goal difference; 3) Goals scored; 4) Head-to-head results; 5) Head-to-head away goals scored; 6) Away goals scored; 7) Play-off.

==== Results summary ====
Overall								Home						Away					
Pld	W	D	L	GF	GA	GD	Pts	W	D	L	GF	GA	GD	W	D	L	GF	GA	GD
34	15	7	12	53	53	0	52	7	1	9	26	37	−11	8	6	3	27	16	+11

Last updated: 27 June 2020.
Source: Bundesliga

==== Results by round ====
Round	1	2	3	4	5	6	7	8	9	10	11	12	13	14	15	16	17	18	19	20	21	22	23	24	25	26	27	28	29	30	31	32	33	34
Ground	A	H	H	A	H	A	A	H	A	H	A	H	A	H	A	A	H	H	A	H	A	H	A	H	A	H	A	H	A	A	H	H	H	A
Result	L	W	D	L	D	L	W	W	W	W	W	L	D	L	L	W	W	L	W	W	L	L	D	L	D	L	D	W	W	D	L	W	W	W
Position	14	9	9	13	11	12	12	11	10	9	8	8	8	8	9	9	7	8	7	7	7	8	8	9	9	9	9	7	7	7	7	7	7	6

Updated to match(es) played on 27 June 2020. Source: Bundesliga
A = Away; H = Home; W = Win; D = Draw; L = Loss

==== Matches ====
The Bundesliga schedule was announced on 28 June 2019.

18 August 2019 1	Eintracht Frankfurt	1–0	1899 Hoffenheim	Frankfurt
15:30 CEST (UTC+2)	Hinteregger 1'; Rebić (yellow card) 39'; Fernandes (yellow card) 61'; Paciência (yellow card) 90+2'	Report	Vogt (yellow card) 90'	Stadium: Commerzbank-Arena; Attendance: 50,200; Referee: Daniel Siebert

24 August 2019 2	1899 Hoffenheim	3–2	Werder Bremen	Sinsheim
15:30 CEST (UTC+2)	Rudy (yellow card) 46'; Bičakčić 54'; Bebou 59'; Kadeřábek 87'; Bittencourt (yellow card) 90+1'	Report	Klaassen (yellow card) 35'; Füllkrug 42'; Eggestein (yellow card) 69' (yellow-red card) 77'; Osako 81'; Moisander (yellow card) 90+2'; Harnik (yellow card) 90+4'	Stadium: Rhein-Neckar-Arena; Attendance: 27,333; Referee: Sascha Stegemann

31 August 2019 3	Bayer Leverkusen	0–0	1899 Hoffenheim	Leverkusen
15:30 CEST (UTC+2)	Tah (yellow card) 90'; Alario (yellow card) 90+5'	Report	Posch (yellow card) 54'; Vogt (yellow card) 90+5'	Stadium: BayArena; Attendance: 26,506; Referee: Felix Zwayer

15 September 2019 4	1899 Hoffenheim	0–3	SC Freiburg	Sinsheim
15:30 CEST (UTC+2)		Report	Höfler (yellow card) 8'; Günter 11'; Haberer 38'; Koch (yellow card) 47'; Petersen 59'	Stadium: PreZero Arena; Attendance: 29,395; Referee: Guido Winkmann

23 September 2019 5	Wolfsburg	1–1	1899 Hoffenheim	Wolfsburg
20:30 CEST (UTC+2)	Mehmedi 36'; Gerhardt (yellow card) 64'; Arnold (yellow card) 76'	Report	Rudy 6'; Posch (yellow card) 14'; Geiger (yellow card) 62'; Akpoguma (yellow card) 90'; Adamyan (yellow card) 90+1'	Stadium: Volkswagen Arena; Attendance: 21,120; Referee: Benjamin Cortus

28 September 2019 6	1899 Hoffenheim	0–3	Borussia Mönchengladbach	Sinsheim
15:30 CEST (UTC+2)	Rudy (yellow card) 60'; Grillitsch (yellow card) 69'	Report	Lainer (yellow card) 7'; Pléa 43'; Thuram 65'; Zakaria (yellow card) 74'; Neuhaus 83'	Stadium: PreZero Arena; Attendance: 29,030; Referee: Harm Osmers

5 October 2019 7	Bayern Munich	1–2	1899 Hoffenheim	Munich
15:30 CEST (UTC+2)	Thiago (yellow card) 45+3'; Lewandowski 73'; Perišić (yellow card) 90'	Report	Adamyan 54', 79'	Stadium: Allianz Arena; Attendance: 75,000; Referee: Tobias Stieler

20 October 2019 8	1899 Hoffenheim	2–0	Schalke 04	Sinsheim
15:30 CEST (UTC+2)	Geiger (yellow card) 37'; Posch (yellow card) 68'; Kramarić 72'; Bebou 85'	Report	Harit (yellow card) 80'; Sané (yellow card) 83'	Stadium: PreZero Arena; Attendance: 29,477; Referee: Robert Hartmann

26 October 2019 9	Hertha BSC	2–3	1899 Hoffenheim	Berlin
15:30 CEST (UTC+2)	Lukebakio 55'; Kalou 69'; Darida (yellow card) 78' (yellow-red card) 84'; Ibišević (yellow card) 78'	Report	Locadia 33'; Kramarić 38'; Rudy (yellow card) 56'; Kadeřábek (yellow card) 74'; Hübner 79'; Baumann (yellow card) 90'	Stadium: Olympiastadion; Attendance: 44,702; Referee: Markus Schmidt

1 November 2019 10	1899 Hoffenheim	3–0	Paderborn 07	Sinsheim
20:30 CET (UTC+1)	Skov 2'; Kadeřábek 15'; Locadia 25'	Report	Mamba (yellow card) 54'	Stadium: PreZero Arena; Attendance: 23,629; Referee: Robert Schröder

8 November 2019 11	1. FC Köln	1–2	1899 Hoffenheim	Cologne
20:30 CET (UTC+1)	Czichos (yellow card) 15'; Córdoba 34', (yellow card) 90+8'; Bornauw (yellow card) 80'; Hector (yellow card) 90+7'	Report	Skov (yellow card) 30'; Rudy (yellow card) 45+1'; Adamyan 48'; Locadia (yellow card) 86', (goal) 90+7' (pen.)	Stadium: RheinEnergieStadion; Attendance: 49,100; Referee: Robert Kampka

24 November 2019 12	1899 Hoffenheim	1–5	Mainz 05	Sinsheim
18:00 CET (UTC+1)	Akpoguma (yellow card) 28'; Kramarić 83'	Report	Onisiwo (yellow card) 10'; Öztunalı 33'; Baku (red card) 45+2'; Kadeřábek 52' (o.g.); Kunde 62', 90+3', (yellow card) 71'; St. Juste (yellow card) 81'; Boëtius 90'	Stadium: PreZero Arena; Attendance: 23,129; Referee: Bastian Dankert

30 November 2019 13	1899 Hoffenheim	1–1	Fortuna Düsseldorf	Sinsheim
15:30 CET (UTC+1)	Kramarić 6'; Posch (yellow card) 54'; Rudy (yellow card) 67'	Report	Hennings (yellow card) 24', (goal) 87'; Tekpetey (yellow card) 26'; Ayhan (yellow card) 55'; Suttner (yellow card) 84'	Stadium: PreZero Arena; Attendance: 25,427; Referee: Martin Petersen

7 December 2019 14	RB Leipzig	3–1	1899 Hoffenheim	Leipzig
15:30 CET (UTC+1)	Werner 11', 52' (pen.); Halstenberg (yellow card) 54'; Laimer (yellow card) 77'; Sabitzer 83', (yellow card) 84'	Report	Posch (yellow card) 51'; Bičakčić 82'	Stadium: Red Bull Arena; Attendance: 38,607; Referee: Deniz Aytekin

13 December 2019 15	1899 Hoffenheim	2–4	FC Augsburg	Sinsheim
20:30 CET (UTC+1)	Samassekou (yellow card) 7'; Skov 14'; Locadia 80'	Report	Max 11', 51' (pen.); Jensen 56'; Iago 85'	Stadium: PreZero Arena; Attendance: 23,309; Referee: Bibiana Steinhaus

17 December 2019 16	Union Berlin	0–2	1899 Hoffenheim	Berlin
20:30 CET (UTC+1)	Ingvartsen (yellow card) 42'; Andrich (yellow card) 53'	Report	Skov (yellow card) 15'; Samassékou (yellow card) 26'; Posch (yellow card) 30'; Hübner (yellow card) 54'; Bebou 56'; Kadeřábek (yellow card) 61'; Kramarić (yellow card) 75'; Baumgartner 90+1'	Stadium: Stadion An der Alten Försterei; Attendance: 20,350; Referee: Sören Storks

20 December 2019 17	1899 Hoffenheim	2–1	Borussia Dortmund	Sinsheim
20:30 CET (UTC+1)	Adamyan 79'; Kramarić 87'	Report	Götze 17'; Akanji (yellow card) 25'	Stadium: PreZero Arena; Attendance: 30,150; Referee: Felix Zwayer

18 January 2020 18	1899 Hoffenheim	1–2	Eintracht Frankfurt	Sinsheim
15:30 CET (UTC+1)	Stafylidis 48'; Posch (yellow card) 65'; Hübner (yellow card) 76'	Report	Dost 18', (yellow card) 89'; Chandler 62'; Kohr (yellow card) 90+1'	Stadium: PreZero Arena; Attendance: 29,610; Referee: Sascha Stegemann

26 January 2020 19	Werder Bremen	0–3	1899 Hoffenheim	Bremen
15:30 CET (UTC+1)	Klaassen (yellow card) 34'; Friedl (yellow card) 60'	Report	Posch (yellow card) 22'; Kramarić (yellow card) 38'; Klaassen 65' (o.g.); Baumgartner 79'; Adamyan 83'	Stadium: Weser-Stadion; Attendance: 40,000; Referee: Martin Petersen

1 February 2020 20	1899 Hoffenheim	2–1	Bayer Leverkusen	Sinsheim
15:30 CET (UTC+1)	Baumgartner (yellow card) 15'; Kramarić 23'; Rudy (yellow card) 48'; Skov 65'; Pentke (yellow card) 86'	Report	Diaby 11'; Demirbay (yellow card) 27' (yellow-red card) 90+2'; L. Bender (yellow card) 44'	Stadium: PreZero Arena; Attendance: 24,489; Referee: Deniz Aytekin

8 February 2020 21	SC Freiburg	1–0	1899 Hoffenheim	Freiburg
15:30 CET (UTC+1)	Höler (yellow card) 39'; Waldschmidt 40' (pen.); Höfler (yellow card) 77'; Abrashi (yellow card) 90+2'	Report	Dabbur (yellow card) 39'; Rudy (yellow card) 66'; Hübner (yellow card) 80'	Stadium: Schwarzwald-Stadion; Attendance: 24,000; Referee: Sven Jablonski

15 February 2020 22	1899 Hoffenheim	2–3	VfL Wolfsburg	Sinsheim
15:30 CET (UTC+1)	Rudy (yellow card) 17'; Baumgartner 45'; Hübner (yellow card) 51'; Kramarić 60' (pen.)	Report	Arnold (yellow card) 7'; Weghorst 18' (pen.), 52' (pen.), 71', (yellow card) 59'	Stadium: PreZero Arena; Attendance: 22,506; Referee: Sören Storks

22 February 2020 23	Borussia Mönchengladbach	1–1	1899 Hoffenheim	Mönchengladbach
15:30 CET (UTC+1)	Ginter 11'; Zakaria (yellow card) 21'; Stindl (yellow card) 39'; Wendt (yellow card) 56'; Herrmann (yellow card) 90+4'	Report	Skov (yellow card) 7'; Baumgartner (yellow card) 71'; Beier (yellow card) 89'; Ribeiro (yellow card) 90', (goal) 90+2'	Stadium: Borussia-Park; Attendance: 50,250; Referee: Felix Brych

29 February 2020 24	1899 Hoffenheim	0–6	Bayern Munich	Sinsheim
15:30 CET (UTC+1)		Report	Gnabry 2'; Kimmich 7'; Zirkzee 15'; Coutinho 33', 47'; Goretzka 62'	Stadium: PreZero Arena; Attendance: 30,150; Referee: Christian Dingert

7 March 2020 25	Schalke 04	1–1	1899 Hoffenheim	Gelsenkirchen
15:30 CET (UTC+1)	McKennie 20'	Report	Baumgartner 69'; Posch (yellow card) 81'	Stadium: Veltins-Arena; Attendance: 58,324; Referee: Sven Jablonski

16 May 2020 26	1899 Hoffenheim	0–3	Hertha BSC	Sinsheim
15:30 CEST (UTC+2)	Baumgartner (yellow card) 48'; Geiger (yellow card) 83'	Report	Pekarík (yellow card) 11'; Boyata (yellow card) 29'; Grujić (yellow card) 40'; Akpoguma 58' (o.g.); Ibišević 60'; Cunha 74'	Stadium: PreZero Arena; Attendance: 0 Referee: Christian Dingert
Note: The match was postponed on 13 March due to the pandemic of COVID-19 in Germany, and rescheduled to 16 May.

23 May 2020 27	SC Paderborn	1–1	1899 Hoffenheim	Paderborn
15:30 CEST (UTC+2)	Srbeny 9', (yellow card) 67'; Vasiliadis (yellow card) 32'; Gjasula (yellow card) 61'	Report	Skov 4'	Stadium: Benteler-Arena; Attendance: 0 Referee: Bibiana Steinhaus
Note: The match was postponed on 13 March due to the pandemic of COVID-19 in Germany, and rescheduled to 23 May.

27 May 2020 28	1899 Hoffenheim	3–1	1. FC Köln	Sinsheim
20:30 CEST (UTC+2)	Hübner (yellow card) 3' (yellow-red card) 50'; Baumgartner 11', 46'; Grillitsch (yellow card) 28'; Dabbur (yellow card) 45+1'; Zuber 48'; Nordtveit (yellow card) 76'; Bebou (yellow card) 84'	Report	Bornauw (red card) 26'; Kainz 60'; Jakobs (yellow card) 65'	Stadium: PreZero Arena; Attendance: 0 Referee: Felix Brych
Note: The match was postponed on 24 March due to the pandemic of COVID-19 in Germany, and rescheduled to 27 May.

30 May 2020 29	Mainz 05	0–1	1899 Hoffenheim	Mainz
15:30 CEST (UTC+2)	Baku (yellow card) 14'; Bruma (yellow card) 19'; Boëtius (yellow card) 43'; Barreiro (yellow card) 44'	Report	Bogarde (yellow card) 12'; Samassékou (yellow card) 18'; Rudy (yellow card) 31'; Bebou 43'	Stadium: Opel Arena; Attendance: 0 Referee: Sascha Stegemann
Note: The match was postponed on 24 March due to the pandemic of COVID-19 in Germany, and rescheduled to 30 May.

6 June 2020 30	Fortuna Düsseldorf	2–2	1899 Hoffenheim	Düsseldorf
15:30 CEST (UTC+2)	Hennings 5', 76' (pen.), (yellow card) 90+4'; Bodzek (yellow card) 26'; Hoffmann (yellow card) 45+1'; Suttner (yellow card) 64'	Report	Hübner (red card) 9'; Dabbur 16'; Skov (yellow card) 53'; Zuber 61'; Nordtveit (yellow card) 75'; Kramarić (yellow card) 87'; Grillitsch (yellow card) 88'	Stadium: Merkur Spiel-Arena; Attendance: 0 Referee: Sören Storks
Note: The match was postponed on 24 March due to the pandemic of COVID-19 in Germany, and rescheduled to 6 June.

12 June 2020 31	1899 Hoffenheim	0–2	RB Leipzig	Sinsheim
20:30 CEST (UTC+2)	Samassékou (yellow card) 3'; Zuber (yellow card) 33'	Report	Olmo 9', 11'; Klostermann (yellow card) 26'; Nkunku (yellow card) 75'	Stadium: PreZero Arena; Attendance: 0 Referee: Tobias Welz
Note: The match was postponed on 24 March due to the pandemic of COVID-19 in Germany, and rescheduled to 12 June.

17 June 2020 32	FC Augsburg	1–3	1899 Hoffenheim	Augsburg
20:30 CEST (UTC+2)	Vargas 69'; Jedvaj (yellow card) 81'; Hahn (yellow card) 90+2'	Report	Dabbur (yellow card) 46', (goal) 59', 62'; Bebou 89'	Stadium: WWK Arena; Attendance: 0 Referee: Deniz Aytekin
Note: The match was postponed on 24 March due to the pandemic of COVID-19 in Germany, and rescheduled to 17 June.

20 June 2020 33	1899 Hoffenheim	4–0	Union Berlin	Sinsheim
15:30 CEST (UTC+2)	Bebou 11'; Kramarić 39'; Dabbur (yellow card) 41', (goal) 45+2'; Baumgartner 68'	Report	Friedrich (yellow card) 21'; Andrich (yellow card) 30'; Andersson (yellow card) 81'	Stadium: PreZero Arena; Attendance: 0 Referee: Robert Hartmann
Note: The match was postponed on 24 March due to the pandemic of COVID-19 in Germany, and rescheduled to 20 June.

27 June 2020 34	Borussia Dortmund	0–4	1899 Hoffenheim	Dortmund
15:30 CEST (UTC+2)	Balerdi (yellow card) 41'	Report	Kramarić 8', 30', 48', 50' (pen.)	Stadium: Signal Iduna Park; Attendance: 0 Referee: Guido Winkmann
Note: The match was postponed on 7 May due to the pandemic of COVID-19 in Germany, and rescheduled to 27 June.

=== DFB-Pokal ===
10 August 2019 First round	Würzburger Kickers	3–3 (a.e.t.) (4–5 p)	1899 Hoffenheim	Würzburg
18:30 CEST (UTC+2)	Schuppan (yellow card) 58'; Kaufmann 68', (yellow card) 101'; Vrenezi 75' (pen.); Hansen (yellow card) 89'; Pfeiffer 114'	Report	Kadeřábek 29'; Bebou 54'; Grillitsch (yellow card) 86'; Szalai 99'	Stadium: Flyeralarm Arena; Attendance: 10,000; Referee: Guido Winkmann
	Penalties
	Hägele (penalty scored); Schuppan (penalty scored); Kaufmann (penalty missed); Vrenezi (penalty scored); Widemann (penalty scored); Hansen (penalty missed)		(penalty scored) Szalai; (penalty scored) Bebou; (penalty scored) Skov; (penalty scored) Rudy; (penalty missed) Rupp; (penalty scored) Posch

29 October 2019 Second round	MSV Duisburg	0–2	1899 Hoffenheim	Duisburg
18:30 CET (UTC+1)	Stoppelkamp (yellow card) 40'; Albutat (yellow card) 80'	Report	Grillitsch 53'; Adamyan 58'; Posch (yellow card) 59'	Stadium: Schauinsland-Reisen-Arena; Attendance: 14,306; Referee: Sören Storks

5 February 2020 Round of 16	Bayern Munich	4–3	1899 Hoffenheim	Munich
20:45 CET (UTC+1)	Hübner 12' (o.g.); Müller 20'; Lewandowski 36', 80'; Tolisso (yellow card) 40'; Pavard (yellow card) 55'; Alaba (yellow card) 84'	Report	Boateng 8' (o.g.); Nordtveit (yellow card) 31'; Dabbur 82', 90+2'	Stadium: Allianz Arena; Attendance: 71,500; Referee: Sascha Stegemann

== Statistics ==
=== Appearances and goals ===
No.	Pos	Nat	Player	Total		Bundesliga		DFB-Pokal	
No.	Pos	Nat	Player	Apps	Goals	Apps	Goals	Apps	Goals
Goalkeepers
1	GK	(Germany) GER	Oliver Baumann	31	0	30	0	1	0
12	GK	(Germany) GER	Philipp Pentke	6	0	4	0	2	0
28	GK	(Germany) GER	Michael Esser	0	0	0	0	0	0
33	GK	(Germany) GER	Alexander Stolz	0	0	0	0	0	0
Defenders
3	DF	(Czech Republic) CZE	Pavel Kadeřábek	33	3	28+2	2	3	1
4	DF	(Bosnia and Herzegovina) BIH	Ermin Bičakčić	22	2	13+8	2	1	0
5	DF	(Greece) GRE	Kostas Stafylidis	7	1	4+3	1	0	0
21	DF	(Germany) GER	Benjamin Hübner	27	1	25	1	2	0
25	DF	(Germany) GER	Kevin Akpoguma	19	0	12+6	0	1	0
31	DF	(Brazil) BRA	Lucas Ribeiro	3	0	0+2	0	0+1	0
32	DF	(Netherlands) NED	Melayro Bogarde	2	0	1+1	0	0	0
38	DF	(Austria) AUT	Stefan Posch	30	0	27+1	0	2	0
Midfielders
6	MF	(Norway) NOR	Håvard Nordtveit	12	0	7+4	0	1	0
8	MF	(Germany) GER	Dennis Geiger	23	0	13+8	0	2	0
11	MF	(Austria) AUT	Florian Grillitsch	34	1	28+3	0	2+1	1
14	MF	(Austria) AUT	Christoph Baumgartner	28	6	17+9	6	1+1	0
16	MF	(Germany) GER	Sebastian Rudy	35	1	31+1	1	3	0
17	MF	(Switzerland) SUI	Steven Zuber	16	2	10+4	2	2	0
18	MF	(Mali) MLI	Diadie Samassékou	21	0	16+5	0	0	0
41	MF	(Israel) ISR	Ilay Elmkies	1	0	0+1	0	0	0
Forwards
7	FW	(Denmark) DEN	Jacob Bruun Larsen	12	0	5+6	0	1	0
9	FW	(Togo) TOG	Ihlas Bebou	35	7	20+12	6	3	1
10	FW	(Israel) ISR	Mu'nas Dabbur	15	6	11+3	4	0+1	2
19	FW	(Algeria) ALG	Ishak Belfodil	5	0	3+2	0	0	0
23	FW	(Armenia) ARM	Sargis Adamyan	16	6	6+9	5	1	1
27	FW	(Croatia) CRO	Andrej Kramarić	20	12	14+5	12	1	0
29	FW	(Denmark) DEN	Robert Skov	33	4	29+2	4	0+2	0
35	FW	(Germany) GER	Maximilian Beier	6	0	0+6	0	0	0
Players transferred out during the season
2	DF	(Netherlands) NED	Joshua Brenet	2	0	0	0	1+1	0
7	MF	(Germany) GER	Lukas Rupp	9	0	4+3	0	0+2	0
20	MF	(Austria) AUT	Robert Žulj	0	0	0	0	0	0
22	MF	(Germany) GER	Kevin Vogt	12	0	11	0	1	0
28	FW	(Hungary) HUN	Ádám Szalai	1	1	0	0	0+1	1
30	FW	(Germany) GER	Philipp Ochs	0	0	0	0	0	0
32	MF	(Italy) ITA	Vincenzo Grifo	1	0	0	0	1	0
37	FW	(Netherlands) NED	Jürgen Locadia	12	4	5+6	4	1	0

Last updated: 27 June 2020
Source: Competitions
