= Michael Guthörl =

German footballer

Personal information
- Full name: Michael Boris Guthörl
- Date of birth: 26 January 1999 (age 27)
- Place of birth: Accra, Ghana
- Height: 1.80 m (5 ft 11 in)
- Position: Right-back

Team information
- Current team: FC 08 Homburg
- Number: 5

Youth career
- –2016: 1. FC Saarbrücken
- 2016–2018: Greuther Fürth

Senior career*
| Years | Team | Apps | (Gls) |
| 2017–2019 | Greuther Fürth II | 31 | (0) |
| 2019–2021 | Wehen Wiesbaden | 18 | (1) |
| 2021–2022 | 1899 Hoffenheim II | 21 | (1) |
| 2022–2023 | Rot-Weiß Koblenz | 19 | (0) |
| 2023–2026 | TSV Steinbach | 81 | (8) |
| 2026– | FC 08 Homburg | 2 | (0) |
- * Club domestic league appearances and goals as of 24 September 2026

Michael Boris Guthörl (born 26 January 1999) is a German-Ghanaian professional footballer who plays as a right-back for FC 08 Homburg.

== Career ==
Guthörl made his professional debut for Wehen Wiesbaden on 11 August 2019 in the first round of the 2019–20 DFB-Pokal, coming on as a substitute for Nicklas Shipnoski in the 102nd minute of extra time against 1. FC Köln. The match went to a penalty shoot-out following a 3–3 draw, in which Guthörl had his shot saved by Timo Horn, with Wiesbaden ultimately losing 3–2 on penalties.
