= Gillian Jurcher =

German footballer

Personal information
- Full name: Gillian Timothy Jurcher
- Date of birth: 9 April 1997 (age 29)
- Place of birth: Hamburg, Germany
- Height: 1.75 m (5 ft 9 in)
- Positions: Centre-forward; right winger

Youth career
- –2011: Condor Hamburg
- 2011–2015: FC St. Pauli

Senior career*
| Years | Team | Apps | (Gls) |
| 2015–2018 | Hamburger SV II | 28 | (2) |
| 2018 | Germania Halberstadt | 15 | (7) |
| 2018–2020 | 1. FC Saarbrücken | 54 | (21) |
| 2020–2022 | Waldhof Mannheim | 26 | (1) |
- * Club domestic league appearances and goals as of 14 May 2022

Gillian Timothy Jurcher (born 9 April 1997) is a German professional footballer who plays as a centre-forward or right winger.
