= Mario Müller =

German footballer

Personal information
- Date of birth: 16 January 1992 (age 34)
- Place of birth: Mannheim, Germany
- Height: 1.73 m (5 ft 8 in)
- Positions: Left-back; left midfielder

Team information
- Current team: Astoria Walldorf
- Number: 23

Youth career
- Waldhof Mannheim
- 2009–2011: Karlsruher SC

Senior career*
Years	Team	Apps	(Gls)
2011–2013	Karlsruher SC II	15	(2)
2013–2015	1. FC Kaiserslautern II	52	(4)
2015–2016	Eintracht Trier	33	(3)
2016–2022	1. FC Saarbrücken	160	(3)
2022–	Astoria Walldorf	33	(0)
- * Club domestic league appearances and goals as of 30 April 2024

Mario Müller (born 16 January 1992) is a German professional footballer who plays as a left-back or left midfielder for Astoria Walldorf.

== Career ==
After playing youth football with Waldhof Mannheim and Karlsruher SC and senior football with Karlsruher SC II, 1. FC Kaiserslautern II and Eintracht Trier, Müller signed for Regionalliga Südwest side 1. FC Saarbrücken on a two-year contract in summer 2016.

== Personal life ==
Müller was born in Mannheim. He is the stepson of Alois Schwartz.
