= Justin Möbius =

German footballer

Personal information
- Date of birth: 21 April 1997 (age 29)
- Place of birth: Berlin, Germany
- Height: 1.79 m (5 ft 10 in)
- Position: Midfielder

Youth career
- BFC Dynamo
- Hertha BSC
- –2011: Tennis Borussia Berlin
- 2011–2016: VfL Wolfsburg

Senior career*
Years	Team	Apps	(Gls)
2016–2018	VfL Wolfsburg II	45	(8)
2016–2018	VfL Wolfsburg	2	(0)
2018–2020	Karlsruher SC	5	(1)
2020–2021	Preußen Münster	18	(1)
2021–2022	BFC Dynamo	17	(0)

International career
2011	Germany U15	2	(0)
- * Club domestic league appearances and goals as of 15 May 2022

Justin Möbius (born 21 April 1997) is a German professional footballer who plays as a midfielder.

== Club career ==
Möbius came through the academy system at VfL Wolfsburg Academy. He called up the second team in 2016. He made his professional debut in the Regionalliga Nord on 30 July 2016 against ETSV Weiche. On 26 October 2015, he made his debut for first team in DFB-Pokal against 1. FC Heidenheim. He played 60 minutes of the game, after he replaced Bruno Henrique.

In July 2020, Möbius joined SC Preußen Münster, newly relegated to the Regionalliga West, on a free transfer from Karlsruher SC.
