= Timm Golley =

German footballer

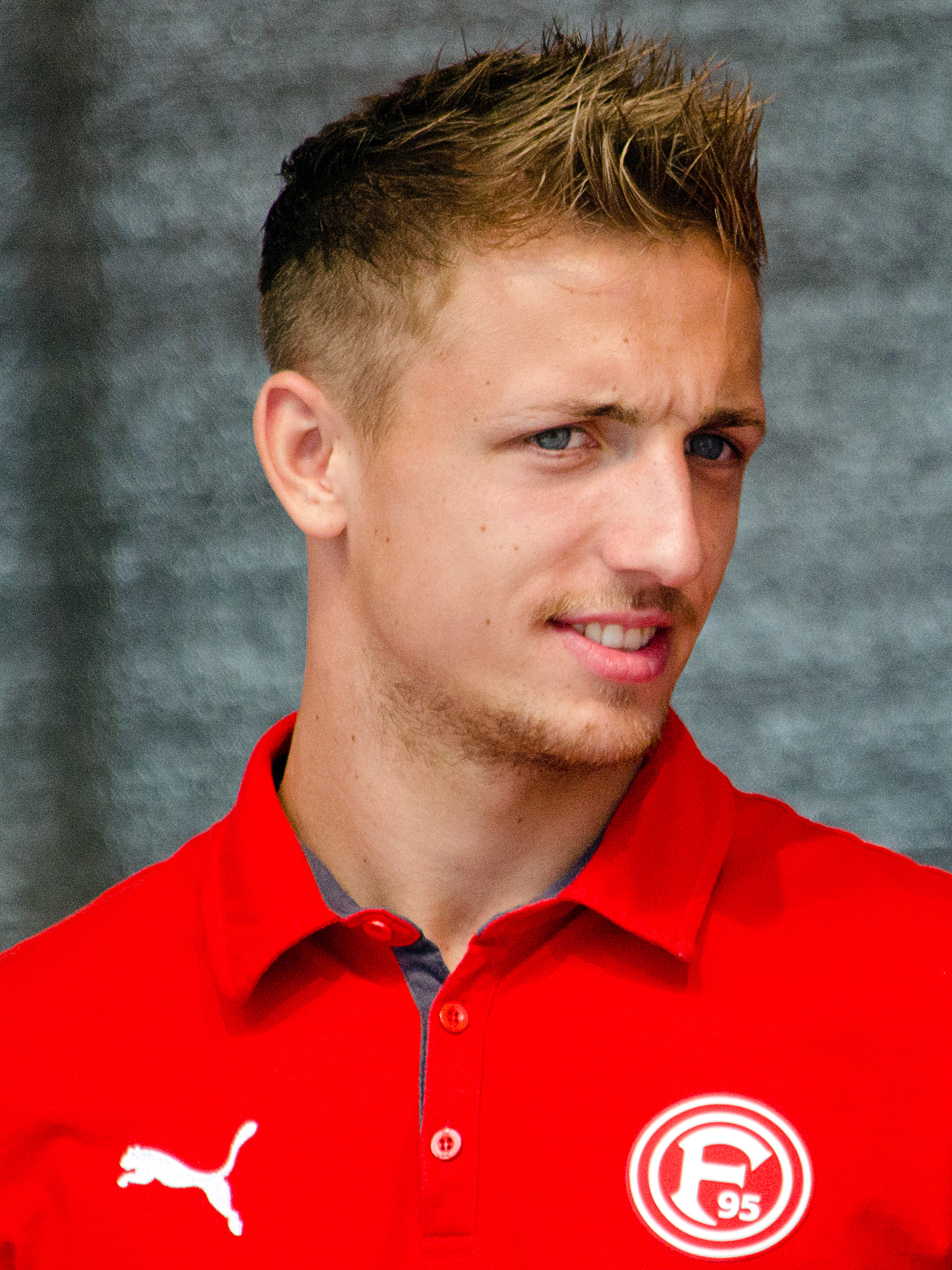
- Golley in 2014

Personal information
- Date of birth: 17 February 1991 (age 35)
- Height: 1.84 m (6 ft 0 in)
- Position: Midfielder

Team information
- Current team: Hamborn 07

Senior career*
Years	Team	Apps	(Gls)
2012–2015	Fortuna Düsseldorf II	54	(13)
2014–2015	Fortuna Düsseldorf	10	(1)
2015	→ FSV Frankfurt (loan)	11	(0)
2015–2016	FSV Frankfurt	10	(1)
2016	→ Wehen Wiesbaden (loan)	31	(9)
2016–2019	Viktoria Köln	83	(28)
2019–2021	1. FC Saarbrücken	36	(4)
2021–	Hamborn 07	0	(0)
- * Club domestic league appearances and goals as of 14 August 2021

Timm Golley (born 17 February 1991) is a German professional footballer who plays as a midfielder for Hamborn 07.

== Career ==
On 13 June 2019, Golley joined 1. FC Saarbrücken on a two-year contract. In 2021, he ended his professional football career in order to concentrate on a regular job. He subsequently joined sixth tier side Hamborn 07.
