= Marvin Thiel =

German footballer

Personal information
- Date of birth: 29 January 1995 (age 31)
- Place of birth: Lübeck, Germany
- Height: 1.75 m (5 ft 9 in)
- Position: Attacking midfielder

Team information
- Current team: VfB Lübeck
- Number: 13

Youth career
- Eichholzer SV
- SF Herrnburg
- –2012: TSV Siems Lübeck
- 2012–2014: VfB Lübeck

Senior career*
Years	Team	Apps	(Gls)
2014–2021	VfB Lübeck	159	(11)
2021–2022	Preußen Münster	20	(0)
2022–	VfB Lübeck	122	(8)
- * Club domestic league appearances and goals as of 22 September 2026

Marvin Thiel (born 29 January 1995) is a German footballer who plays as an attacking midfielder for side VfB Lübeck.
