= Luca Steinfeldt =

German footballer

Personal information
- Date of birth: 28 September 1996 (age 30)
- Place of birth: Münster, Germany
- Height: 1.82 m (6 ft 0 in)
- Position: Forward

Team information
- Current team: Preußen Münster II
- Number: 28

Youth career
- Borussia Emsdetten
- TuS Laer 08
- –2012: Preußen Münster
- 2012–2015: Borussia Dortmund

Senior career*
Years	Team	Apps	(Gls)
2015–2016	MSV Duisburg II	21	(2)
2016–2018	Preußen Münster II	54	(46)
2017–2018	Preußen Münster	2	(0)
2018–2019	TuS Haltern	23	(4)
2019–2021	Rot Weiss Ahlen	41	(10)
2021–2022	SV Lippstadt 08	22	(2)
2022–	Preußen Münster II	13	(6)
- * Club domestic league appearances and goals as of 13 November 2022

Luca Steinfeldt (born 28 September 1996) is a German footballer who plays as a forward for Preußen Münster II.
