= Matthias Haeder =

German footballer

Personal information
- Date of birth: 23 February 1989 (age 37)
- Place of birth: Germany
- Height: 1.75 m (5 ft 9 in)
- Positions: Attacking midfielder; forward

Team information
- Current team: FC Gütersloh
- Number: 10

Youth career
- –2002: TuS Volmerdingsen
- 2002–2008: Arminia Bielefeld

Senior career*
Years	Team	Apps	(Gls)
2008–2010	Arminia Bielefeld		
2010–2021	SC Verl	273	(47)
2021–	FC Gütersloh	28	(3)

International career
2009	Germany U20	1	(0)
- * Club domestic league appearances and goals as of 22 August 2023

Matthias Haeder (born 23 February 1989) is a German professional footballer who plays as an attacking midfielder or forward for FC Gütersloh.
