= Robin Ziegele =

German footballer

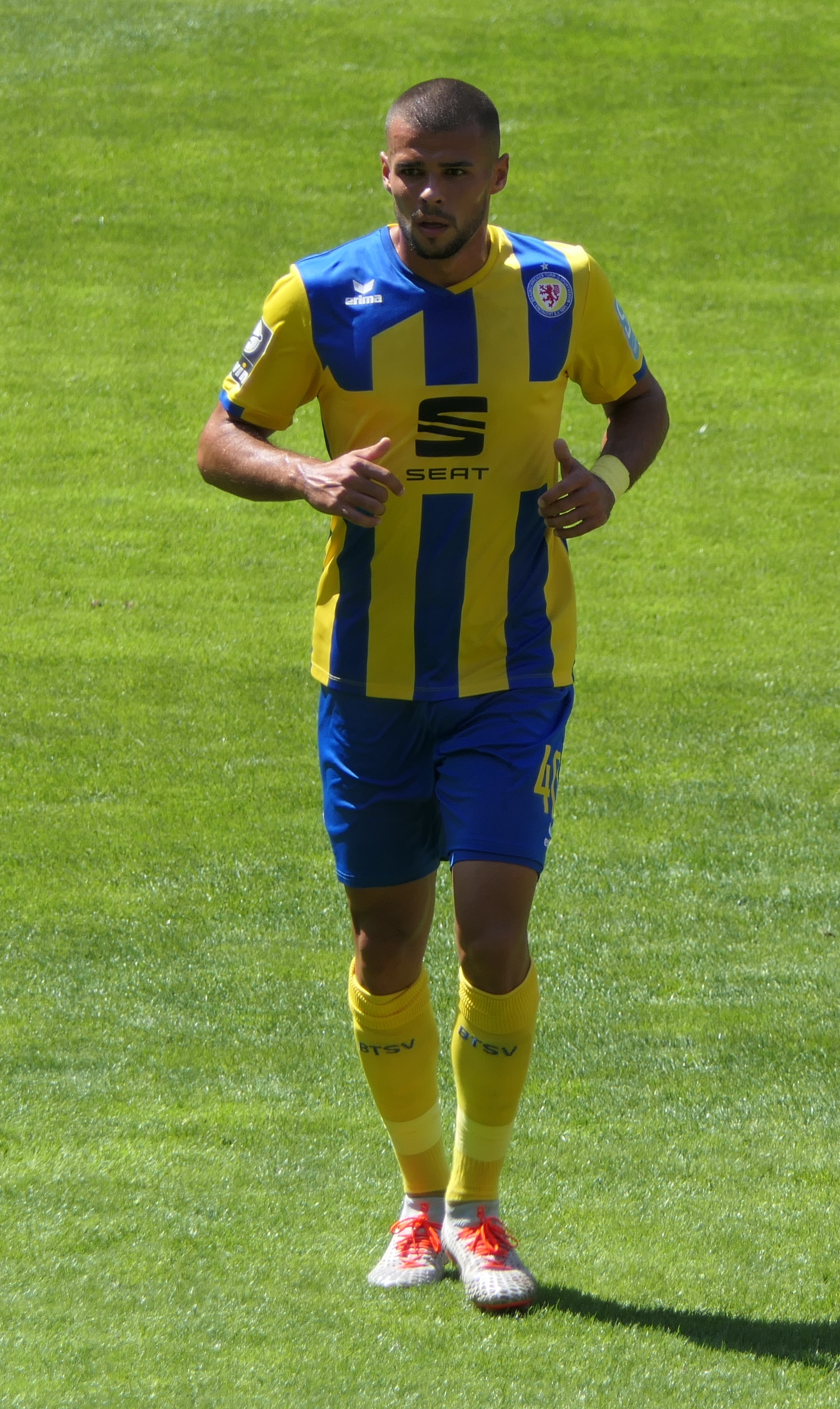
- Ziegele with Eintracht Braunschweig in 2019

Personal information
- Date of birth: 13 March 1997 (age 29)
- Place of birth: Wolfsburg, Germany
- Height: 1.86 m (6 ft 1 in)
- Position: Centre-back

Team information
- Current team: Jahn Regensburg
- Number: 14

Youth career
- 2002–2004: JSG Mörse/Ehmen
- 2004–2016: VfL Wolfsburg

Senior career*
Years	Team	Apps	(Gls)
2016–2019	VfL Wolfsburg II	53	(3)
2019–2021	Eintracht Braunschweig	35	(1)
2021–2022	Preußen Münster	25	(2)
2022–2023	FSV Zwickau	27	(1)
2023–	Jahn Regensburg	65	(3)

International career
2014–2015	Germany U18	3	(0)
2015	Germany U19	2	(0)
- * Club domestic league appearances and goals as of 14:40, 26 September 2026 (UTC)

Robin Ziegele (born 13 March 1997) is a German professional footballer who plays as a centre-back for 3. Liga club Jahn Regensburg.

== Career ==
After playing youth football with JSG Mörse/Ehmen and VfL Wolfsburg, Ziegele started his senior career with VfL Wolfsburg II during the 2016–17 seasons and made 53 appearances, scoring three goals, across three seasons at the club.

In summer 2019, Ziegele signed for Eintracht Braunschweig on a two-year contract. Ziegele made his professional debut for Eintracht Braunschweig in the 3. Liga on 30 July 2019, starting in the away match against Carl Zeiss Jena which finished as a 2–0 win. He made 20 appearances across the 2019–20 season, scoring once, as Braunschweig were promoted to the 2. Bundesliga. He made 15 appearances for the club during the 2020–21 season.

He signed for Regionalliga West club Preußen Münster in September 2021. He made 25 Regionalliga West appearances during the 2021–22 season.

Ziegele signed for FSV Zwickau on 1 July 2022 on a two-year contract for an undisclosed fee.

In June 2023, he signed for Jahn Regensburg on a two-year contract. In January 2025, his contract was extended by two years to summer 2027.
