= Hendrik Hansen =

German footballer

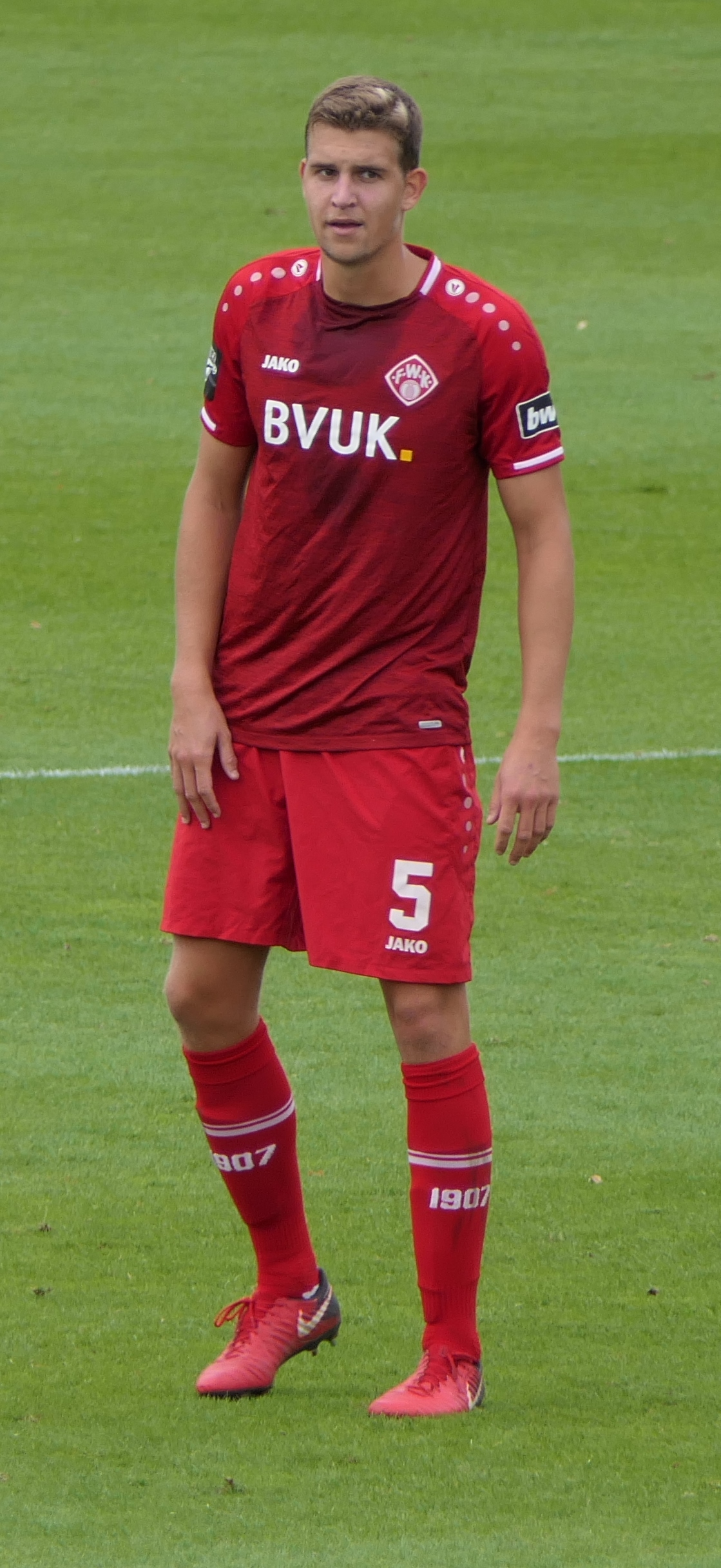
- Hansen with Würzburger Kickers in 2018

Personal information
- Date of birth: 4 November 1994 (age 31)
- Place of birth: Wolfsburg, Germany
- Height: 1.95 m (6 ft 5 in)
- Position: Centre-back

Team information
- Current team: Würzburger FV

Youth career
- –2002: SV Reislingen/Neuhaus
- 2002–2012: VfL Wolfsburg

Senior career*
| Years | Team | Apps | (Gls) |
| 2012–2017 | VfL Wolfsburg II | 65 | (1) |
| 2016 | VfL Wolfsburg | 1 | (0) |
| 2017–2021 | Würzburger Kickers | 51 | (3) |
| 2018 | Würzburger Kickers II | 1 | (0) |
| 2022–2023 | SSV Ulm 1846 | 6 | (1) |
| 2023–2024 | SG Barockstadt | 5 | (0) |
| 2024– | Würzburger FV | 0 | (0) |

International career^{‡}
| 2011–2012 | Germany U18 | 5 | (0) |
- * Club domestic league appearances and goals as of 18 May 2024 ‡ National team caps and goals as of 29 October 2016

Hendrik Hansen (born 4 November 1994) is a German footballer who plays as a centre-back for Bayernliga club Würzburger FV.

== Career ==
In July 2017, Hansen left his hometown club VfL Wolfsburg after 15 years, and joined 3. Liga side Würzburger Kickers on a two-year deal.

On 25 January 2022, SSV Ulm 1846 announced that they had signed Hansen on a six-month contract.
