= 2020–21 FC Schalke 04 season =

Schalke 04
2020–21 season
- SVB Chairman: Jens Buchta
- Manager: David Wagner (until 27 September); Manuel Baum (from 30 September to 18 December); Huub Stevens (interim, from 18 to 22 December); Christian Gross (from 27 December to 28 February); Dimitrios Grammozis (from 2 March)
- Stadium: Veltins-Arena
- Bundesliga: 18th (relegated)
- DFB-Pokal: Round of 16
- Top goalscorer: League: Matthew Hoppe (6); All: Matthew Hoppe (6)
Home colours	Away colours	Third colours

The 2020–21 FC Schalke 04 season was the 117th season in the football club's history and 30th consecutive and 53rd overall season in the top flight of German football, the Bundesliga, having been promoted from the 2. Bundesliga in 1991. In addition to the domestic league, Schalke 04 also participated in this season's edition of the domestic cup, the DFB-Pokal. This was the 20th season for Schalke in the Veltins-Arena, located in Gelsenkirchen, North Rhine-Westphalia. The season covered the period from 1 July 2020 to 30 June 2021.

Schalke suffered a disastrous start to the season, becoming only the fifth Bundesliga team to go winless in their first 14 fixtures. They also became the first Bundesliga team with 5 managers in a season. Schalke's relegation was confirmed on the 20th of April, following a 1–0 defeat at Arminia Bielefeld.

== Players ==
Note: Players' appearances and goals only in their Schalke career.

As of end of 2020–21 season.

No.	Name	Nat.	Pos.	Age	Contract		Bundesliga		Total	
No.	Name	Nat.	Pos.	Age	began	ends	Apps	Goals	Apps	Goals
Goalkeepers
1	Ralf Fährmann	(Germany)	GK	32	Jul 2011	Jun 2023	200	0	259	0
23	Frederik Rønnow	(Denmark)	GK	28	Sep 2020	Jun 2021	11	0	11	0
34	Michael Langer	(Austria)	GK	36	Aug 2017	Jun 2022	3	0	3	0
Defenders
2	Kilian Ludewig	(Germany)	DF	21	Oct 2020	Jun 2021	6	0	8	0
3	Hamza Mendyl	(Morocco)	DF	23	Aug 2018	Jun 2023	12	0	21	0
5	Matija Nastasić	(Serbia)	DF	28	Jan 2015	Jun 2022	122	1	157	2
13	William	(Brazil)	DF	26	Jan 2021	Jun 2021	8	0	9	0
17	Benjamin Stambouli	(France)	DF	30	Aug 2016	Jun 2021 (Note: The contract of the player originally ended in June 2023, but is not valid for the 2. Bundesliga and therefore ends in June 2021.)	105	0	133	0
20	Sead Kolašinac (captain)	(Bosnia and Herzegovina)	DF	28	Jan 2021	Jun 2021	111	5	141	5
24	Bastian Oczipka	(Germany)	DF	32	Jul 2017	Jun 2021	111	1	126	1
26	Salif Sané	(Senegal)	DF	30	Jul 2018	Jun 2022	59	4	71	6
30	Shkodran Mustafi	(Germany)	DF	29	Feb 2021	Jun 2021	13	1	13	1
31	Timo Becker	(Germany)	DF	24	Jul 2020	Jun 2023	30	0	33	0
33	Malick Thiaw	(Germany)	DF	19	Jul 2020	Jun 2024	23	1	26	1
Midfielders
6	Omar Mascarell	(Spain)	MF	28	Jul 2018	Jun 2022	61	1	71	1
8	Suat Serdar	(Germany)	MF	24	Jul 2018	Jun 2022	71	10	83	11
10	Nabil Bentaleb	(Algeria)	MF	26	Aug 2016	Jun 2021	82	12	107	19
16	Nassim Boujellab	(Morocco)	MF	22	Apr 2019	Jun 2022	30	1	34	1
25	Amine Harit	(Morocco)	MF	24	Jul 2017	Jun 2024	102	12	119	13
28	Alessandro Schöpf	(Austria)	MF	27	Jan 2016	Jun 2021	112	10	143	16
37	Levent Mercan	(Germany)	MF	20	Aug 2019	Jun 2023	6	0	7	1
40	Can Bozdoğan	(Germany)	MF	20	Jul 2020	Jun 2024	17	0	18	0
42	Kerim Çalhanoğlu	(Germany)	MF	18	Sep 2020	Jun 2024	4	0	4	0
Forwards
7	Mark Uth	(Germany)	FW	29	Jul 2018	Jun 2022	48	5	59	7
9	Benito Raman	(Belgium)	FW	26	Jul 2019	Jun 2024	50	6	55	12
18	Gonçalo Paciência	(Portugal)	FW	26	Sep 2020	Jun 2021	15	1	16	1
21	Klaas-Jan Huntelaar	(Netherlands)	FW	37	Jan 2021	Jun 2021	184	84	249	128
22	Steven Skrzybski	(Germany)	FW	28	Jul 2018	Jun 2021	25	3	32	4
43	Matthew Hoppe	(United States)	FW	20	Feb 2021	Jun 2023	22	6	24	6

== Transfers ==
=== In ===
Pos	Player	From	Type	Window	Ends	Fee in €	Ref.
FW	(Netherlands) Klaas-Jan Huntelaar	(Netherlands) Ajax	Transfer	Winter	2021	Free	
FW	(Germany) Shkodran Mustafi	(England) Arsenal	Transfer	Winter	2021	Free	
DF	(Bosnia and Herzegovina) Sead Kolašinac	(England) Arsenal	Loan	Winter	2021	Free	
DF	(Brazil) William	(Germany) VfL Wolfsburg	Loan	Winter	2021	250,000	
FW	(United States) Matthew Hoppe	(Germany) Schalke 04 II	Promoted	Winter	2023	—	
FW	(Bosnia and Herzegovina) Vedad Ibišević	(Germany) Hertha BSC	End of contract	Summer	2021	—	
FW	(Portugal) Gonçalo Paciência	(Germany) Eintracht Frankfurt	Loan	Summer	2021	1,500,000 (Note: Loan fee with option to buy for €8.5M)	
DF	(Germany) Kilian Ludewig	(Austria) Red Bull Salzburg	Loan	Summer	2021	Free	
GK	(Denmark) Frederik Rønnow	(Germany) Eintracht Frankfurt	Loan	Summer	2021	Free	
DF	(Germany) Timo Becker	(Germany) Schalke 04 II	Promoted	Summer	2021	—	
MF	(Germany) Can Bozdoğan	(Germany) Schalke 04 U19	Promoted	Summer	2022	—	—
MF	(Germany) Kerim Çalhanoğlu	(Germany) Schalke 04 U19	Promoted	Summer	2024	—	
MF	(United States) Nick Taitague	(Germany) Schalke 04 II	Promoted	Summer	2021	—	—
DF	(Germany) Malick Thiaw	(Germany) Schalke 04 U19	Promoted	Summer	2024	—	
MF	(Algeria) Nabil Bentaleb	(England) Newcastle United	Loan return	Summer	2021	—	—
DF	(Germany) Jonas Carls	(Germany) Viktoria Köln	Loan return	Summer	2022	—	—
GK	(Germany) Ralf Fährmann	(Norway) Brann	Loan return	Summer	2022	—	—
DF	(Spain) Pablo Insua	(Spain) Huesca	Loan return	Summer	2021	—	—
DF	(Morocco) Hamza Mendyl	(France) Dijon	Loan return	Summer	2023	—	—
MF	(Germany) Sebastian Rudy	(Germany) 1899 Hoffenheim	Loan return	Summer	2022	—	—
FW	(Germany) Steven Skrzybski	(Germany) Fortuna Düsseldorf	Loan return	Summer	2021	—	—
FW	(Ghana) Bernard Tekpetey	(Germany) Fortuna Düsseldorf	Loan return (premature)	Summer	2023	—	—
FW	(Germany) Cedric Teuchert	(Germany) Hannover 96	Loan return	Summer	2021	—	—
FW	(Germany) Mark Uth	(Germany) 1. FC Köln	Loan return	Summer	2022	—	—

=== Out ===
Pos	Player	To	Type	Window	Fee in €	Ref.
DF	(Turkey) Ozan Kabak	(England) Liverpool	Loan	Winter	1,500,000 (Note: Loan fee with option to buy for €21.0M+€10.0M variables)	
FW	(Turkey) Ahmed Kutucu	(Netherlands) Heracles Almelo	Loan	Winter	Free	
FW	(Wales) Rabbi Matondo	(England) Stoke City	Loan	Winter	Free	
FW	(Bosnia and Herzegovina) Vedad Ibišević	Free agent	Contract terminated	Winter	—	
MF	(United States) Nick Taitague	Retired	Contract terminated	Winter	—	
DF	(Spain) Pablo Insua	(Spain) Huesca	Transfer	Summer	250,000	
FW	(Austria) Guido Burgstaller	(Germany) FC St. Pauli	Transfer	Summer	Free	
FW	(Germany) Cedric Teuchert	(Germany) Union Berlin	Transfer	Summer	Free	
MF	(Germany) Daniel Caligiuri	(Germany) FC Augsburg	End of contract	Summer	—	
GK	(Germany) Alexander Nübel	(Germany) Bayern Munich	End of contract	Summer	—	
MF	(United States) Weston McKennie	(Italy) Juventus	Loan	Summer	4,500,000 (Note: Loan fee with option to buy for €18.5M+€6.5M variables)	
FW	(Ghana) Bernard Tekpetey	(Bulgaria) Ludogorets Razgrad	Loan	Summer	400,000	
DF	(Germany) Jonas Carls	(Portugal) Vitória Guimarães	Loan	Summer	90,000	
MF	(Germany) Sebastian Rudy	(Germany) 1899 Hoffenheim	Loan	Summer	Free	
GK	(Germany) Markus Schubert	(Germany) Eintracht Frankfurt	Loan	Summer	Free	
FW	(Austria) Michael Gregoritsch	(Germany) FC Augsburg	End of loan	Summer	—	—
DF	(England) Jonjoe Kenny	(England) Everton	End of loan	Summer	—	—
DF	(Spain) Juan Miranda	(Spain) Barcelona	End of loan (premature)	Summer	—	
DF	(France) Jean-Clair Todibo	(Spain) Barcelona	End of loan	Summer	—	—

== Club ==
=== Kit ===
Supplier: Umbro / Sponsor: Gazprom

Home	Home alt.	Away	Away alt.	Third

== Friendly matches ==
Win Draw Loss

9 August 2020 1	VfL Osnabrück (Germany)	1–5	(Germany) Schalke 04	Ankum, Germany
19:00 CEST (UTC+2)	Henning 58'	Report	Kabak 15'; Skrzybski 46', 60'; Schöpf 67'; Kutucu 89'	Stadium: Quitt-Stadion; Attendance: 0 Referee: Florian Heft (Germany)
Note: The match was played behind closed doors due to the COVID-19 pandemic.

15 August 2020 2	Schalke 04 (Germany)	4–5	(Germany) SC Verl	Gelsenkirchen, Germany
18:30 CEST (UTC+2)	Skrzybski 24', 32'; Uth 29'; Raman 55'	Report	Janjić 17'; Schikowski 18', 46', 58'; Korb 57'	Stadium: Parkstadion; Attendance: 300; Referee: Marco Goldmann (Germany)
Note: The match was played in four 30-minute quarters.

18 August 2020 3	Schalke 04 (Germany)	1–3	(Germany) KFC Uerdingen	Gelsenkirchen, Germany
18:00 CEST (UTC+2)	Kutucu 88'	Report	Pusch 4'; Van Ooijen 24'; Großkreutz 73' (pen.)	Stadium: Parkstadion; Attendance: 300; Referee: Sven Waschitzki (Germany)

28 August 2020 4	Schalke 04 (Germany)	1–0	(Greece) Aris Thessaloniki	Kematen, Austria
13:00 CEST (UTC+2)	Kutucu 47'	Report		Stadium: Stadion Kematen; Attendance: 220; Referee: Nenad Kostacevic (Austria)

5 September 2020 5	Schalke 04 (Germany)	3–0	(Germany) VfL Bochum	Gelsenkirchen, Germany
15:30 CEST (UTC+2)	Boujellab 25'; Uth 33'; Harit 39'	Report		Stadium: Parkstadion; Attendance: 300; Referee: Mitja Stegemann (Germany)

8 October 2020 6	Schalke 04 (Germany)	5–1	(Germany) SC Paderborn	Gelsenkirchen, Germany
14:00 CEST (UTC+2)	Uth 21', 31', 81'; Ibišević 45'; Raman 56'	Report	Pröger 13'	Stadium: Parkstadion; Attendance: 300; Referee: Thorben Siewer (Germany)

== Competitions ==
Win Draw Loss

=== Overview ===
Competition	First match	Last match	Starting round	Final position	Record							
Competition	First match	Last match	Starting round	Final position	Pld	W	D	L	GF	GA	GD	Win %
Bundesliga	18 September 2020	22 May 2021	Matchday 1	18th	34	3	7	24	25	86	−61	8.82
DFB-Pokal	3 November 2020	3 February 2021	First round	Round of 16	3	2	0	1	7	3	+4	66.67
Total					37	5	7	25	32	89	−57	13.51

Last updated: 22 May 2021
Source: Soccerway

=== Bundesliga ===
==== League table ====
Pos	Team	Pld	W	D	L	GF	GA	GD	Pts	Qualification or relegation
14	Hertha BSC	34	8	11	15	41	52	−11	35	
15	Arminia Bielefeld	34	9	8	17	26	52	−26	35	
16	1. FC Köln (O)	34	8	9	17	34	60	−26	33	Qualification for the relegation play-offs
17	Werder Bremen (R)	34	7	10	17	36	57	−21	31	Relegation to 2. Bundesliga
18	Schalke 04 (R)	34	3	7	24	25	86	−61	16	Relegation to 2. Bundesliga

Source: DFB
Rules for classification: 1) Points; 2) Goal difference; 3) Goals scored; 4) Head-to-head results; 5) Head-to-head away goals scored; 6) Away goals scored; 7) Play-off.
(O) Play-off winners; (R) Relegated

==== Results summary ====
Overall								Home						Away					
Pld	W	D	L	GF	GA	GD	Pts	W	D	L	GF	GA	GD	W	D	L	GF	GA	GD
34	3	7	24	25	86	−61	16	3	3	11	14	34	−20	0	4	13	11	52	−41

Last updated: 22 May 2021.
Source: Bundesliga

==== Results by round ====
Round	1	2	3	4	5	6	7	8	9	10	11	12	13	14	15	16	17	18	19	20	21	22	23	24	25	26	27	28	29	30	31	32	33	34
Ground	A	H	A	H	A	H	A	H	A	H	A	H	H	A	H	A	H	H	A	H	A	H	A	H	A	H	A	H	A	A	H	A	H	A
Result	L	L	L	D	L	D	D	L	L	L	D	L	L	L	W	L	L	L	D	L	D	L	L	D	L	L	L	W	L	L	L	L	W	L
Position	18	18	18	17	17	17	17	18	18	18	18	18	18	18	17	18	18	18	18	18	18	18	18	18	18	18	18	18	18	18	18	18	18	18

Updated to match(es) played on 22 May 2021. Source: DFB
A = Away; H = Home; W = Win; D = Draw; L = Loss

==== Matches ====
The Bundesliga schedule was announced on 7 August 2020.

18 September 2020 1	Bayern Munich	8–0	Schalke 04	Munich
20:30 CEST (UTC+02:00)	Gnabry 4', 47', 59'; Goretzka 19'; Lewandowski 31' (pen.); Kimmich (yellow card) 65'; Müller 70'; Sané 71'; Musiala 81'	Report	Kabak (yellow card) 30'; Stambouli (yellow card) 81'	Stadium: Allianz Arena; Attendance: 0 Referee: Felix Zwayer

26 September 2020 2	Schalke 04	1–3	Werder Bremen	Gelsenkirchen
18:30 CEST (UTC+02:00)	Paciência (yellow card) 35'; Stambouli (yellow card) 36'; Uth (yellow card) 38', (goal) 90+3'; Boujellab (yellow card) 55'; Kabak (yellow card) 58' (yellow-red card) 84'; Bentaleb (yellow card) 63'	Report	Füllkrug 22', 37', 59' (pen.); Mbom (yellow card) 74'; Klaassen (yellow card) 78'	Stadium: Veltins-Arena; Attendance: 0 Referee: Markus Schmidt

3 October 2020 3	RB Leipzig	4–0	Schalke 04	Leipzig
18:30 CEST (UTC+02:00)	Bozdoğan 31' (o.g.); Angeliño 35'; Orbán 45+2'; Halstenberg 80' (pen.); Sørloth (yellow card) 84'	Report	Sané (yellow card) 64'; Nastasić (yellow card) 79'; Ibišević (yellow card) 90+2'	Stadium: Red Bull Arena; Attendance: 8,500; Referee: Florian Badstübner

18 October 2020 4	Schalke 04	1–1	Union Berlin	Gelsenkirchen
18:00 CEST (UTC+02:00)	Paciência 69', (yellow card) 77'; Skrzybski (yellow card) 71'; Harit (yellow card) 83'	Report	Friedrich 55'; Prömel (yellow card) 74'	Stadium: Veltins-Arena; Attendance: 300; Referee: Patrick Ittrich

24 October 2020 5	Borussia Dortmund	3–0	Schalke 04	Dortmund
18:30 CEST (UTC+02:00)	Akanji 55'; Haaland 61'; Hummels 78'	Report	Mascarell (yellow card) 13'	Stadium: Signal Iduna Park; Attendance: 300; Referee: Felix Zwayer

30 October 2020 6	Schalke 04	1–1	VfB Stuttgart	Gelsenkirchen
20:30 CET (UTC+01:00)	Thiaw 30'; Sané (yellow card) 56'; Mascarell (yellow card) 59'	Report	Castro (yellow card) 37'; González 56' (pen.), (yellow card) 81'	Stadium: Veltins-Arena; Attendance: 0 Referee: Benjamin Brand

7 November 2020 7	Mainz 05	2–2	Schalke 04	Mainz
15:30 CET (UTC+01:00)	Brosinski 6' (pen.); Mateta 45+2' (pen.); Latza (yellow card) 64'	Report	Uth 36'; Kabak (yellow card) 44'; St. Juste 82' (o.g.)	Stadium: Opel Arena; Attendance: 0 Referee: Patrick Ittrich

21 November 2020 8	Schalke 04	0–2	VfL Wolfsburg	Gelsenkirchen
15:30 CET (UTC+01:00)		Report	Weghorst 3'; Schlager 24', (yellow card) 86'	Stadium: Veltins-Arena; Attendance: 0 Referee: Marco Fritz

28 November 2020 9	Borussia Mönchengladbach	4–1	Schalke 04	Mönchengladbach
18:30 CET (UTC+01:00)	Neuhaus 15'; Lazaro (yellow card) 26'; Wendt 36'; Thuram (yellow card) 46', (goal) 52'; Wolf 80'	Report	Raman 20'; Ludewig (yellow card) 34'; Thiaw (yellow card) 50'; Uth (yellow card) 84'	Stadium: Borussia-Park; Attendance: 0 Referee: Manuel Gräfe

6 December 2020 10	Schalke 04	0–3	Bayer Leverkusen	Gelsenkirchen
18:00 CET (UTC+01:00)	Uth (yellow card) 11'; Skrzybski (penalty missed) 71'; Hoppe (yellow card) 72'	Report	Thiaw 10' (o.g.); Dragović (yellow card) 58'; Tah (yellow card) 59'; Baumgartlinger 67'; Sinkgraven (yellow card) 71'; Schick 78'	Stadium: Veltins-Arena; Attendance: 0 Referee: Benjamin Cortus

13 December 2020 11	FC Augsburg	2–2	Schalke 04	Augsburg
15:30 CET (UTC+01:00)	Serdar 32' (o.g.); Niederlechner (yellow card) 45+4' (yellow-red card) 53'; Khedira (yellow card) 77'; Richter 90+3'	Report	Sané (yellow card) 45+5'; Raman 52'; Boujellab 62'; Kabak (yellow card) 64'; Fährmann (yellow card) 81'; Skrzybski (yellow card) 90'	Stadium: WWK Arena; Attendance: 0 Referee: Manuel Gräfe

16 December 2020 12	Schalke 04	0–2	SC Freiburg	Gelsenkirchen
18:30 CET (UTC+01:00)	Raman (yellow card) 19'; Serdar (yellow card) 83'	Report	Santamaria (yellow card) 36'; Sallai 50', 68'	Stadium: Veltins-Arena; Attendance: 0 Referee: Sven Jablonski

19 December 2020 13	Schalke 04	0–1	Arminia Bielefeld	Gelsenkirchen
15:30 CET (UTC+01:00)	Oczipka (yellow card) 26'; Serdar (yellow card) 57'; Mendyl (yellow card) 60'; Harit (yellow card) 85'; Raman (yellow card) 90'; Sané (yellow card) 90+6'	Report	Prietl (yellow card) 31'; Klos 53'; Pieper (yellow card) 55'; Brunner (yellow card) 66'; Schipplock (yellow card) 74'; Dōan (yellow card) 86'	Stadium: Veltins-Arena; Attendance: 0 Referee: Bastian Dankert

2 January 2021 14	Hertha BSC	3–0	Schalke 04	Berlin
18:30 CET (UTC+01:00)	Tousart (yellow card) 14'; Guendouzi 36', (yellow card) 51'; Córdoba 52'; Piątek 80'	Report	Hoppe (yellow card) 37'; Mascarell (yellow card) 58'	Stadium: Olympiastadion; Attendance: 0 Referee: Sven Jablonski

9 January 2021 15	Schalke 04	4–0	1899 Hoffenheim	Gelsenkirchen
15:30 CET (UTC+01:00)	Kabak (yellow card) 24'; Hoppe 42', 57', 63'; Uth (yellow card) 71'; Harit 80'	Report	Bogarde (yellow card) 13'; Kramarić (yellow card) 42'; Gaćinović (yellow card) 50'; Baumgartner (yellow card) 52'	Stadium: Veltins-Arena; Attendance: 0 Referee: Felix Zwayer

17 January 2021 16	Eintracht Frankfurt	3–1	Schalke 04	Frankfurt
18:00 CET (UTC+01:00)	Silva 28'; Jović 72', 90+1'	Report	Hoppe 29'; Kutucu (yellow card) 87'	Stadium: Commerzbank-Arena; Attendance: 0 Referee: Manuel Gräfe

20 January 2021 17	Schalke 04	1–2	1. FC Köln	Gelsenkirchen
18:30 CET (UTC+01:00)	Stambouli (yellow card) 48'; Hoppe 57'; Boujellab (yellow card) 89'	Report	Czichos 31'; Horn (yellow card) 89'; Thielmann 90+3'	Stadium: Veltins-Arena; Attendance: 0 Referee: Daniel Siebert

24 January 2021 18	Schalke 04	0–4	Bayern Munich	Gelsenkirchen
15:30 CET (UTC+01:00)	Nastasić (yellow card) 80'	Report	Müller 33', 88'; Lewandowski 54'; Boateng (yellow card) 84'; Alaba 90'	Stadium: Veltins-Arena; Attendance: 0 Referee: Sascha Stegemann

30 January 2021 19	Werder Bremen	1–1	Schalke 04	Bremen
15:30 CET (UTC+01:00)	Möhwald 77'	Report	Mascarell 38'; Stambouli (yellow card) 63'; Fährmann (yellow card) 66'; Huntelaar (yellow card) 88'; Thiaw (yellow card) 90+2'	Stadium: Weser-Stadion; Attendance: 0 Referee: Sören Storks

6 February 2021 20	Schalke 04	0–3	RB Leipzig	Gelsenkirchen
15:30 CET (UTC+01:00)	Mascarell (yellow card) 27'; Kolašinac (yellow card) 69'	Report	Mukiele 45+3'; Sabitzer 73', (yellow card) 82'; Orbán 87'	Stadium: Veltins-Arena; Attendance: 0 Referee: Martin Petersen

13 February 2021 21	Union Berlin	0–0	Schalke 04	Berlin
18:30 CET (UTC+01:00)	Trimmel (yellow card) 2'; Hübner (yellow card) 75'; Musa (yellow card) 82'	Report	William (yellow card) 34'; Harit (yellow card) 85'	Stadium: Stadion An der Alten Försterei; Attendance: 0 Referee: Daniel Schlager

20 February 2021 22	Schalke 04	0–4	Borussia Dortmund	Gelsenkirchen
18:30 CET (UTC+01:00)	Hoppe (yellow card) 14'; Kolašinac (yellow card) 66'	Report	Sancho 42'; Haaland 45', 79'; Guerreiro 60'; Bellingham (yellow card) 63'; Dahoud (yellow card) 64'	Stadium: Veltins-Arena; Attendance: 0 Referee: Daniel Siebert

27 February 2021 23	VfB Stuttgart	5–1	Schalke 04	Stuttgart
15:30 CET (UTC+01:00)	Endo 10', 26', (yellow card) 66'; Kalajdžić 34'; Castro (yellow card) 59'; Klement 88'; Didavi 90+2'	Report	Becker (yellow card) 29'; Kolašinac 40'; Bentaleb (penalty missed) 72', (yellow card) 88'; Thiaw (yellow card) 77'	Stadium: Mercedes-Benz Arena; Attendance: 0 Referee: Guido Winkmann

5 March 2021 24	Schalke 04	0–0	Mainz 05	Gelsenkirchen
20:30 CET (UTC+01:00)	Kolašinac (yellow card) 9'; Mascarell (yellow card) 85'	Report	Bell (yellow card) 47'; Szalai (yellow card) 51'	Stadium: Veltins-Arena; Attendance: 0 Referee: Felix Brych

13 March 2021 25	VfL Wolfsburg	5–0	Schalke 04	Wolfsburg
15:30 CET (UTC+01:00)	Mustafi 32' (o.g.); Weghorst 51'; Baku 58'; Brekalo 64'; Philipp 79'	Report	William (yellow card) 55'	Stadium: Volkswagen Arena; Attendance: 0 Referee: Sören Storks

20 March 2021 26	Schalke 04	0–3	Borussia Mönchengladbach	Gelsenkirchen
18:30 CET (UTC+01:00)	Mascarell (yellow card) 22'	Report	Bensebaini (yellow card) 7'; Stindl 15', (yellow card) 54'; Lainer 63'; Rønnow 72' (o.g.)	Stadium: Veltins-Arena; Attendance: 0 Referee: Tobias Stieler

3 April 2021 27	Bayer Leverkusen	2–1	Schalke 04	Leverkusen
15:30 CEST (UTC+2)	Alario 26'; Schick 72'; Tapsoba (yellow card) 73'	Report	Huntelaar 81'	Stadium: BayArena; Attendance: 0 Referee: Sven Jablonski

11 April 2021 28	Schalke 04	1–0	FC Augsburg	Gelsenkirchen
15:30 CEST (UTC+2)	Serdar 4'	Report	Gouweleeuw (yellow card) 35'; Framberger (yellow card) 74'	Stadium: Veltins-Arena; Attendance: 0 Referee: Harm Osmers

17 April 2021 29	SC Freiburg	4–0	Schalke 04	Freiburg
15:30 CEST (UTC+2)	Höler 7'; Santamaria (yellow card) 9'; Sallai 22' (pen.); Heintz (yellow card) 29'; Günter 50', 74'	Report	Huntelaar (yellow card) 21'	Stadium: Schwarzwald-Stadion; Attendance: 0 Referee: Tobias Reichel

20 April 2021 30	Arminia Bielefeld	1–0	Schalke 04	Bielefeld
20:30 CEST (UTC+2)	Klos (yellow card) 25', (goal) 50', (penalty missed) 80'; Brunner (yellow card) 39'; Pieper (yellow card) 53'	Report	Thiaw (yellow card) 58' (yellow-red card) 71'; Stambouli (yellow card) 64'; Kolašinac (yellow card) 90+1'; Sané (yellow card) 90+4'	Stadium: SchücoArena; Attendance: 0 Referee: Christian Dingert

8 May 2021 32	1899 Hoffenheim	4–2	Schalke 04	Sinsheim
15:30 CEST (UTC+2)	Kramarić 47'; Akpoguma 52'; Baumgartner 60'; Adamyan (yellow card) 62'; Bebou 64'	Report	Uth 12', (yellow card) 56'; Serdar (yellow card) 35'; Mustafi 42'	Stadium: Rhein-Neckar-Arena; Attendance: 0 Referee: Guido Winkmann

12 May 2021 31	Schalke 04	1–2	Hertha BSC	Gelsenkirchen
18:00 CEST (UTC+2)	Harit 6', (yellow card) 43'; Mustafi (yellow card) 54'; Kolašinac (yellow card) 68'	Report	Boyata 19', (yellow card) 68'; Darida (yellow card) 50'; Lukebakio (yellow card) 67' (yellow-red card) 89'; Ngankam 74'; Michelbrink (yellow card) 90+1'	Stadium: Veltins-Arena; Attendance: 0 Referee: Markus Schmidt
Note: The match was originally scheduled for 24 April 2021, but was postponed due to the entire Hertha BSC first team had to be quarantined after several COVID-19 cases at the club.

15 May 2021 33	Schalke 04	4–3	Eintracht Frankfurt	Gelsenkirchen
15:30 CEST (UTC+02:00)	Huntelaar (penalty missed) 15', 15'; Idrizi 52'; Flick 60'; Hoppe 64'	Report	Silva 29', 72'; Ndicka 51'; Chandler (yellow card) 90'; Ache (yellow card) 90+1'	Stadium: Veltins-Arena; Attendance: 0 Referee: Sven Jablonski

22 May 2021 34	1. FC Köln	1–0	Schalke 04	Cologne
15:30 CEST (UTC+02:00)	Bornauw (yellow card) 44', (goal) 86'	Report	Flick (yellow card) 30'; Idrizi (yellow card) 69'	Stadium: RheinEnergieStadion; Attendance: 0 Referee: Daniel Siebert

=== DFB-Pokal ===
3 November 2020 First round	1. FC Schweinfurt	1–4	Schalke 04	Gelsenkirchen
16:30 CET (UTC+01:00)	Thomann 37'; Marinkovic (yellow card) 44'; Böhnlein (yellow card) 56'; Rinderknecht (yellow card) 72'	Report	Ibišević 39'; Schöpf 44', 81'; Bentaleb (yellow card) 56'; Sané (yellow card) 69'; Stambouli (yellow card) 74'; Raman 86'	Stadium: Veltins-Arena; Attendance: 0 Referee: Sven Jablonski

22 December 2020 Second round	SSV Ulm	1–3	Schalke 04	Gelsenkirchen
18:30 CET (UTC+01:00)	Çoban (yellow card) 44'; Reichert (yellow card) 48', (goal) 82'; Higl (yellow card) 89'	Report	Serdar 27'; Raman (yellow card) 35', (goal) 51', 63'	Stadium: Veltins-Arena; Attendance: 0 Referee: Daniel Schlager

3 February 2021 Round of 16	VfL Wolfsburg	1–0	Schalke 04	Wolfsburg
18:30 CET (UTC+01:00)	Brooks (yellow card) 28'; Weghorst (penalty missed) 40', 40'; Paulo Otávio (yellow card) 61'	Report	Thiaw (yellow card) 29'; William (yellow card) 76'	Stadium: Volkswagen Arena; Attendance: 0 Referee: Felix Zwayer

== Statistics ==
As of end of 2020–21 season.

=== Squad statistics ===
No.	Player	Nat.	Pos.	Total					Bundesliga					DFB-Pokal				
No.	Player	Nat.	Pos.	Apps	St.	Goal	Booked	Sent off (straight red)	Apps	St.	Goal	Booked	Sent off (straight red)	Apps	St.	Goal	Booked	Sent off (straight red)
1	Ralf Fährmann	(Germany)	GK	25	25	0	2	0	22	22	0	2	0	3	3	0	0	0
23	Frederik Rønnow	(Denmark)	GK	11	10	0	0	0	11	10	0	0	0	0	0	0	0	0
34	Michael Langer	(Austria)	GK	3	2	0	0	0	3	2	0	0	0	0	0	0	0	0
2	Kilian Ludewig	(Germany)	DF	8	8	0	1	0	6	6	0	1	0	2	2	0	0	0
3	Hamza Mendyl	(Morocco)	DF	5	2	0	1	0	3	1	0	1	0	2	1	0	0	0
5	Matija Nastasić	(Serbia)	DF	18	17	0	2	0	15	14	0	2	0	3	3	0	0	0
13	William	(Brazil)	DF	9	8	0	3	0	8	7	0	2	0	1	1	0	1	0
15	Henning Matriciani (Note: Player from Schalke II)	(Germany)	DF	1	0	0	0	0	1	0	0	0	0	0	0	0	0	0
17	Benjamin Stambouli	(France)	DF	27	25	0	6	0	24	22	0	5	0	3	3	0	1	0
20	Sead Kolašinac	(Bosnia and Herzegovina)	DF	18	17	1	5	0	17	16	1	5	0	1	1	0	0	0
24	Bastian Oczipka	(Germany)	DF	30	21	0	1	0	27	20	0	1	0	3	1	0	0	0
26	Salif Sané	(Senegal)	DF	15	11	0	6	0	14	11	0	5	0	1	0	0	1	0
30	Shkodran Mustafi	(Germany)	DF	13	11	1	1	0	13	11	1	1	0	0	0	0	0	0
31	Timo Becker	(Germany)	DF	22	20	0	1	0	20	18	0	1	0	2	2	0	0	0
33	Malick Thiaw	(Germany)	DF	22	17	1	4	1	19	15	1	3	1	3	2	0	1	0
49	Vasilios Pavlidis (Note: Player from Schalke U19)	(Greece)	DF	1	0	0	0	0	1	0	0	0	0	0	0	0	0	0
~~4~~	Ozan Kabak (Note: Player transferred out during the season)	(Turkey)	DF	14	14	0	4	1	14	14	0	4	1	0	0	0	0	0
6	Omar Mascarell	(Spain)	MF	26	22	1	6	0	24	21	1	6	0	2	1	0	0	0
8	Suat Serdar	(Germany)	MF	26	25	2	3	0	25	24	1	3	0	1	1	1	0	0
10	Nabil Bentaleb	(Algeria)	MF	10	7	0	3	0	9	6	0	2	0	1	1	0	1	0
16	Nassim Boujellab	(Morocco)	MF	13	6	1	2	0	12	6	1	2	0	1	0	0	0	0
25	Amine Harit	(Morocco)	MF	31	27	2	4	0	28	25	2	4	0	3	2	0	0	0
28	Alessandro Schöpf	(Austria)	MF	21	12	2	0	0	19	10	0	0	0	2	2	2	0	0
36	Blendi Idrizi	(Kosovo)	MF	3	3	1	1	0	3	3	1	1	0	0	0	0	0	0
37	Levent Mercan	(Germany)	MF	1	0	0	0	0	1	0	0	0	0	0	0	0	0	0
38	Mehmet-Can Aydın	(Germany)	MF	6	6	0	0	0	6	6	0	0	0	0	0	0	0	0
40	Can Bozdoğan	(Germany)	MF	15	5	0	0	0	14	5	0	0	0	1	0	0	0	0
41	Florian Flick	(Germany)	MF	4	4	1	1	0	4	4	1	1	0	0	0	0	0	0
42	Kerim Çalhanoğlu	(Germany)	MF	4	4	0	0	0	4	4	0	0	0	0	0	0	0	0
45	Jimmy Kaparos	(Netherlands)	MF	1	0	0	0	0	1	0	0	0	0	0	0	0	0	0
47	Mikail Maden	(Norway)	MF	1	0	0	0	0	1	0	0	0	0	0	0	0	0	0
~~13~~	Sebastian Rudy	(Germany)	MF	2	2	0	0	0	2	2	0	0	0	0	0	0	0	0
7	Mark Uth	(Germany)	FW	21	19	3	5	0	20	18	3	5	0	1	1	0	0	0
9	Benito Raman	(Belgium)	FW	27	15	5	3	0	25	13	2	2	0	2	2	3	1	0
18	Gonçalo Paciência	(Portugal)	FW	16	9	1	2	0	15	9	1	2	0	1	0	0	0	0
21	Klaas-Jan Huntelaar	(Netherlands)	FW	9	7	2	2	0	9	7	2	2	0	0	0	0	0	0
22	Steven Skrzybski	(Germany)	FW	15	5	0	2	0	13	3	0	2	0	2	2	0	0	0
27	Luca Schuler	(Germany)	FW	2	0	0	0	0	2	0	0	0	0	0	0	0	0	0
43	Matthew Hoppe	(United States)	FW	24	16	6	3	0	22	15	6	3	0	2	1	0	0	0
~~11~~	Vedad Ibišević (Note: Player's contract dissolved during the season)	(Bosnia and Herzegovina)	FW	5	2	1	1	0	4	1	0	1	0	1	1	1	0	0
~~14~~	Rabbi Matondo	(Wales)	FW	3	3	0	0	0	3	3	0	0	0	0	0	0	0	0
~~15~~	Ahmed Kutucu	(Turkey)	FW	8	0	0	1	0	7	0	0	1	0	1	0	0	0	0
Total				37		31	76	2	34		24	70	2	3		7	6	0

=== Goalscorers ===
Rank	Pos.	Player	Bundesliga	DFB-Pokal	Total
1	FW	(United States) Matthew Hoppe	6	0	6
2	FW	(Belgium) Benito Raman	2	3	5
3	FW	(Germany) Mark Uth	3	0	3
4	MF	(Morocco) Amine Harit	2	0	2
4	FW	(Netherlands) Klaas-Jan Huntelaar	2	0	2
4	MF	(Germany) Suat Serdar	1	1	2
4	MF	(Austria) Alessandro Schöpf	0	2	2
7	MF	(Morocco) Nassim Boujellab	1	0	1
7	MF	(Germany) Florian Flick	1	0	1
7	MF	(Kosovo) Blendi Idrizi	1	0	1
7	DF	(Bosnia and Herzegovina) Sead Kolašinac	1	0	1
7	MF	(Spain) Omar Mascarell	1	0	1
7	DF	(Germany) Shkodran Mustafi	1	0	1
7	FW	(Portugal) Gonçalo Paciência	1	0	1
7	DF	(Germany) Malick Thiaw	1	0	1
7	FW	(Bosnia and Herzegovina) Vedad Ibišević	0	1	1
Own goals			1	0	1
Total			25	7	32
