= 2022–23 TSG 1899 Hoffenheim season =

TSG 1899 Hoffenheim
2022–23 season
- Owner: Dietmar Hopp (96%)
- Chairman: Kristian Baumgärtner (interim)
- Head coach: André Breitenreiter (until 6 February); Pellegrino Matarazzo (from 8 February)
- Stadium: Rhein-Neckar-Arena
- Bundesliga: 12th
- DFB-Pokal: Round of 16
- Top goalscorer: League: Andrej Kramarić (12); All: Andrej Kramarić (12)
Home colours	Away colours	Third colours

The 2022–23 season was the 124th season in the history of TSG 1899 Hoffenheim and their 15th consecutive season in the top flight. The club participated in the Bundesliga and the DFB-Pokal. The season covers the period from 1 July 2022 to 30 June 2023.

== Players ==
As of 30 January 2023

Note: Flags indicate national team as defined under FIFA eligibility rules; some limited exceptions apply. Players may hold more than one non-FIFA nationality.

No.	Pos.	Nation	Player
1	GK	GER	Oliver Baumann (vice-captain)
3	DF	CZE	Pavel Kadeřábek
4	DF	BIH	Ermin Bičakčić
5	DF	TUR	Ozan Kabak
6	MF	GER	Grischa Prömel
7	FW	DEN	Jacob Bruun Larsen
8	MF	GER	Dennis Geiger
9	FW	TOG	Ihlas Bebou
10	FW	ISR	Mu'nas Dabbur
11	DF	ESP	Angeliño (on loan from RB Leipzig)
12	GK	GER	Philipp Pentke
13	MF	GER	Angelo Stiller
14	MF	AUT	Christoph Baumgartner
16	MF	GER	Sebastian Rudy
17	MF	DEN	Thomas Delaney (on loan from Sevilla)

No.	Pos.	Nation	Player
19	FW	DEN	Kasper Dolberg (on loan from Nice)
20	MF	GER	Finn Ole Becker
22	DF	GER	Kevin Vogt (4th captain)
23	DF	USA	John Brooks
24	DF	USA	Justin Che (on loan from FC Dallas)
25	DF	NGR	Kevin Akpoguma
26	DF	POR	Eduardo Quaresma (on loan from Sporting CP)
27	FW	CRO	Andrej Kramarić
29	FW	DEN	Robert Skov
34	DF	FRA	Stanley Nsoki
36	GK	GER	Nahuel Noll
37	GK	GER	Luca Philipp
39	MF	GER	Tom Bischof
40	MF	GER	Umut Tohumcu
44	FW	GER	Fisnik Asllani

=== Players out on loan ===
Note: Flags indicate national team as defined under FIFA eligibility rules; some limited exceptions apply. Players may hold more than one non-FIFA nationality.

No.	Pos.	Nation	Player
—	FW	GER	Maximilian Beier (at Hannover 96 until 30 June 2023)
—	DF	NED	Melayro Bogarde (at PEC Zwolle until 30 June 2023)
—	MF	GER	Marco John (at Greuther Fürth until 30 June 2023)
—	DF	GHA	Kasim Nuhu (at FC Basel until 30 June 2023)
—	DF	AUT	Stefan Posch (at Bologna until 30 June 2023)
—	DF	BRA	Lucas Ribeiro (at Ceará until 30 June 2023)
—	MF	MLI	Diadie Samassékou (at Olympiacos until 30 June 2023)

== Transfers ==
=== Transfers in ===
Position	Player	Transferred from	Fee	Date	Source
MF	(Germany) Finn Ole Becker	(Germany) FC St. Pauli	Free	1 July 2022	
MF	(Germany) Muhammed Damar	(Germany) Eintracht Frankfurt U19	€500,000	1 July 2022	
MF	(Germany) Grischa Prömel	(Germany) Union Berlin	Free	1 July 2022	
DF	(Turkey) Ozan Kabak	(Germany) Schalke 04	€7,000,000	23 July 2022	
DF	(France) Stanley Nsoki	(Belgium) Club Brugge	€12,000,000	3 August 2022	
DF	(Portugal) Eduardo Quaresma	(Portugal) Sporting CP	Loan	4 August 2022	
DF	(Spain) Angeliño	(Germany) RB Leipzig	Loan	8 August 2022	
FW	(Denmark) Kasper Dolberg	(France) Nice	Loan	2 January 2023	
DF	(United States) John Brooks	(Portugal) Benfica	€300,000	26 January 2023	
MF	(Denmark) Thomas Delaney	(Spain) Sevilla	Loan	30 January 2023	

=== Transfers out ===
Position	Player	Transferred to	Fee	Date	Source
MF	(Serbia) Mijat Gaćinović	(Greece) AEK Athens	€1,000,000	1 July 2022	
MF	(Austria) Florian Grillitsch	(Netherlands) Ajax	Free	1 July 2022	
FW	(Brazil) Klauss	(United States) St. Louis City SC	€3,200,000	1 July 2022	
DF	(Norway) Håvard Nordtveit		Free	1 July 2022	
FW	(Germany) David Otto	(Germany) FC St. Pauli	€150,000	1 July 2022	
FW	(Armenia) Sargis Adamyan	(Germany) 1. FC Köln	€1,500,000	5 July 2022	
DF	(Greece) Kostas Stafylidis	(Germany) VfL Bochum	€250,000	6 July 2022	
DF	(Ghana) Kasim Nuhu	(Switzerland) FC Basel	Loan	21 July 2022	
DF	(Germany) David Raum	(Germany) RB Leipzig	€26,000,000	31 July 2022	
DF	(Germany) Marco John	(Germany) Greuther Fürth	Loan	26 August 2022	
DF	(Netherlands) Melayro Bogarde	(Netherlands) PEC Zwolle	Loan	1 September 2022	
DF	(Austria) Stefan Posch	(Italy) Bologna	Loan	1 September 2022	
MF	(Mali) Diadie Samassékou	(Greece) Olympiacos	Loan	16 September 2022	
DF	(Germany) Benjamin Hübner		Retired	6 December 2022	
FW	(France) Georginio Rutter	(England) Leeds United	€28,000,000	14 January 2023	

== Pre-season and friendlies ==
Win Draw Loss Fixtures

2 July 2022 Friendly	Astoria Walldorf	0–4	TSG Hoffenheim	Walldorf, Germany
17:30 CEST (UTC+2)		Report	Bruun Larsen 3', 42'; Damar 75'; Asllani 79'	Stadium: Dietmar-Hopp-Sportpark; Attendance: 1,500

9 July 2022 Friendly	TSG Hoffenheim	2–0	1. FC Heidenheim	Brackenheim, Germany
15:30 CEST (UTC+2)	Kramarić 14'; Kadeřábek 35'	Report	Maloney (yellow card) 75'	Stadium: Wiesentalstadion; Attendance: 1,750

13 July 2022 Friendly	TSG Hoffenheim	2–0	Puskás Akadémia	Kitzbühel, Austria
18:00 CEST (UTC+2)	Skov 34'; Kramarić 39'	Report	Van Nieff (yellow card) 62'	Stadium: Sportplatz Langau

16 July 2022 Friendly	Salernitana	2–2	TSG Hoffenheim	Kitzbühel, Austria
15:00 CEST (UTC+1)	Kristoffersen 16', (penalty missed) 31'; Cavion 38'	Report	Kramarić 8'; Rutter 37'	Stadium: Sportplatz Langau; Referee: Andreas Schett (Austria)

23 July 2022 Friendly	TSG Hoffenheim	3–2	Hellas Verona	Sinsheim, Germany
15:30 CEST (UTC+2)	Baumgartner (yellow card) 47', (goal) 84'; Prömel 58', 89'	Report	Lasagna 12', 29'; Lazović (yellow card) 40'	Stadium: Rhein-Neckar-Arena; Attendance: 6,427; Referee: Lars Erbst (Germany)
Note: Match was played over four 30-minute periods.

14 December 2022 Friendly	TSG Hoffenheim	4–3	SV Elversberg	Hoffenheim, Germany
14:00 CET (UTC+1)				Stadium: Dietmar-Hopp-Stadion

17 December 2022 Friendly	TSG Hoffenheim	3–2	1860 Munich	Hoffenheim, Germany
15:00 CET (UTC+1)				Stadium: Dietmar-Hopp-Stadion

20 December 2022 Friendly	TSG Hoffenheim	3–3	Greuther Fürth	Hoffenheim, Germany
14:00 CET (UTC+1)	Georginio 78' (pen.); Mokwa 88'; Bischof 106'		Hrgota 59'; Abiama 72'; Sieb 74'	Stadium: Dietmar-Hopp-Stadion
Note: Match was played over two 60-minute periods.

6 January 2023 Friendly	TSG Hoffenheim	2–3	VfL Wolfsburg	Almancil, Portugal
15:30 CET (UTC+1)				Stadium: Estádio Municipal de Almancil

9 January 2023 Friendly	TSG Hoffenheim	3–1	Servette	Albufeira, Portugal
16:00 CET (UTC+1)				Stadium: Estádio Municipal de Albufeira

14 January 2023 Friendly	Mainz 05	2–2	TSG Hoffenheim	Mainz, Germany
14:00 CET (UTC+1)	Fulgini 28'; Barreiro 106'		Che 57'; Dabbur 138'	Stadium: Stadion am Bruchweg
Note: Match was played in two 70-minute halves.

== Competitions ==
=== Overall record ===
Competition	First match	Last match	Starting round	Final position	Record							
Competition	First match	Last match	Starting round	Final position	Pld	W	D	L	GF	GA	GD	Win %
Bundesliga	6 August 2022	27 May 2023	Matchday 1	12th	34	10	6	18	48	57	−9	29.41
DFB-Pokal	30 July 2022	1 February 2023	First round	Round of 16	3	2	0	1	8	4	+4	66.67
Total					37	12	6	19	56	61	−5	32.43

Source: Soccerway

=== Bundesliga ===
==== League table ====
Pos	Team	Pld	W	D	L	GF	GA	GD	Pts
10	Borussia Mönchengladbach	34	11	10	13	52	55	−3	43
11	1. FC Köln	34	10	12	12	49	54	−5	42
12	1899 Hoffenheim	34	10	6	18	48	57	−9	36
13	Werder Bremen	34	10	6	18	51	64	−13	36
14	VfL Bochum	34	10	5	19	40	72	−32	35

Source: DFB
Rules for classification: 1) Points; 2) Goal difference; 3) Goals scored; 4) Head-to-head results; 5) Head-to-head away goals scored; 6) Away goals scored; 7) Play-off.

==== Results summary ====
Overall								Home						Away					
Pld	W	D	L	GF	GA	GD	Pts	W	D	L	GF	GA	GD	W	D	L	GF	GA	GD
34	10	6	18	48	57	−9	36	7	2	8	28	29	−1	3	4	10	20	28	−8

Source: DFB

==== Results by round ====
Round	1	2	3	4	5	6	7	8	9	10	11	12	13	14	15	16	17	18	19	20	21	22	23	24	25	26	27	28	29	30	31	32	33	34
Ground	A	H	A	H	A	H	H	A	H	A	H	A	H	A	H	A	H	H	A	H	A	H	A	A	H	A	H	A	H	A	H	A	H	A
Result	L	W	W	W	L	W	D	D	L	W	L	D	L	L	L	L	D	L	L	L	L	L	L	L	W	W	W	D	L	L	W	L	W	D
Position	14	8	6	4	7	4	4	5	7	4	7	7	9	10	11	13	13	13	14	14	15	16	16	18	15	15	14	13	14	14	14	14	13	12

Source: DFB
A = Away; H = Home; W = Win; D = Draw; L = Loss

==== Matches ====
The league fixtures were announced on 17 June 2022.

6 August 2022 1	Borussia Mönchengladbach	3–1	TSG Hoffenheim	Mönchengladbach
15:30 CEST (UTC+2)	Scally (yellow card) 13'; Bensebaini 42'; Thuram 71'; Elvedi 78'	Report	Posch (yellow card) 15' (yellow-red card) 19'; Samassékou (yellow card) 22'; Skov 25'; Vogt (yellow card) 75'	Stadium: Borussia-Park; Attendance: 49,659; Referee: Daniel Siebert

13 August 2022 2	TSG Hoffenheim	3–2	VfL Bochum	Sinsheim
15:30 CEST (UTC+2)	Baumgartner 14'; Kabak 23'; Kramarić (penalty missed) 59'; Akpoguma (yellow card) 67'; Dabbur 88'	Report	Zoller 10', 13'; Losilla (yellow card) 58'	Stadium: Rhein-Neckar-Arena; Attendance: 17,005; Referee: Patrick Ittrich

20 August 2022 3	Bayer Leverkusen	0–3	TSG Hoffenheim	Leverkusen
15:30 CEST (UTC+2)	Diaby (yellow card) 56'	Report	Baumgartner 9'; Kramarić 34'; Kabak (yellow card) 57'; Rutter (yellow card) 74', (goal) 78'; Akpoguma (yellow card) 86'	Stadium: BayArena; Attendance: 26,300; Referee: Tobias Reichel

27 August 2022 4	TSG Hoffenheim	1–0	FC Augsburg	Sinsheim
15:30 CEST (UTC+2)	Geiger 39'; Kabak (yellow card) 72'	Report	Bauer (yellow card) 59'	Stadium: Rhein-Neckar-Arena; Attendance: 17,206; Referee: Tobias Welz

2 September 2022 5	Borussia Dortmund	1–0	TSG Hoffenheim	Dortmund
20:30 CEST (UTC+2)	Reus 16', (yellow card) 57'; Bellingham (yellow card) 57'; Hummels (yellow card) 76'	Report	Skov (yellow card) 35'; Vogt (yellow card) 57'; Kabak (yellow card) 64'; Kramarić (yellow card) 80'	Stadium: Signal Iduna Park; Attendance: 79,300; Referee: Daniel Siebert

10 September 2022 6	TSG Hoffenheim	4–1	Mainz 05	Hoffenheim
15:30 CEST (UTC+2)	Baumgartner (yellow card) 9'; Akpoguma (yellow card) 10'; Kramarić 53'; Vogt (yellow card) 66'; Prömel 69'; Dabbur 80'; Kadeřábek 90+2'	Report	Hack (red card) 41'; Kohr 83'; Onisiwo (yellow card) 85'; Bell (yellow card) 87'	Stadium: Rhein-Neckar-Arena; Attendance: 20,114; Referee: Daniel Schlager

18 September 2022 7	TSG Hoffenheim	0–0	SC Freiburg	Hoffenheim
19:30 CEST (UTC+2)	Dabbur (yellow card) 80'	Report	Günter (yellow card) 56'; Ginter (yellow card) 80'	Stadium: Rhein-Neckar-Arena; Attendance: 24,233; Referee: Deniz Aytekin

2 October 2022 8	Hertha BSC	1–1	TSG Hoffenheim	Berlin
15:30 CEST (UTC+2)	Serdar (yellow card) 22'; Šunjić (yellow card) 29'; Lukebakio 37'	Report	Kramarić 25'; Geiger (yellow card) 29'	Stadium: Olympiastadion; Attendance: 41,653; Referee: Christian Dingert

7 October 2022 9	TSG Hoffenheim	1–2	Werder Bremen	Hoffenheim
20:30 CEST (UTC+2)	Geiger (yellow card) 8'; Dabbur 32'; Vogt (yellow card) 71'; Kabak (yellow card) 90+1'	Report	Ducksch 18'; Gruev (yellow card) 44'; Friedl (yellow card) 45'; Füllkrug 87' (pen.); Bittencourt (yellow card) 90+3'	Stadium: Rhein-Neckar-Arena; Attendance: 25,410; Referee: Benjamin Cortus

14 October 2022 10	Schalke 04	0–3	TSG Hoffenheim	Gelsenkirchen
20:30 CEST (UTC+2)	Greiml (yellow card) 10'; Drexler (yellow card) 57'	Report	Skov 11' (pen.), 59' (pen.); Vogt (yellow card) 19'; Prömel (yellow card) 38'; Dabbur 45+2'	Stadium: Veltins-Arena; Attendance: 59,811; Referee: Florian Badstubner

22 October 2022 11	TSG Hoffenheim	0–2	Bayern Munich	Hoffenheim
15:30 CEST (UTC+2)	Baumgartner (yellow card) 33'; Prömel (yellow card) 68'; Kabak (yellow card) 80'	Report	Musiala 17'; Choupo-Moting 38'; Upamecano (yellow card) 51'; Kimmich (yellow card) 61'	Stadium: Rhein-Neckar-Arena; Attendance: 30,150; Referee: Sven Jablonski

30 October 2022 12	1. FC Köln	1–1	TSG Hoffenheim	Cologne
19:30 CEST (UTC+2)	Kainz 13'; Duda (yellow card) 51'	Report	Kabak (yellow card) 7' (yellow-red card) 87'; Bruun Larsen 36'	Stadium: RheinEnergieStadion; Attendance: 49,000; Referee: Frank Willenborg

5 November 2022 13	TSG Hoffenheim	1–3	RB Leipzig	Sinsheim
15:30 CET (UTC+1)	Geiger (yellow card) 13'; Akpoguma (yellow card) 26'; Rutter (yellow card) 27', (goal) 50'; Nsoki (yellow card) 29'	Report	Nkunku 17', 57'; Diallo (yellow card) 37'; Olmo 69'; Raum (yellow card) 83'	Stadium: Rhein-Neckar-Arena; Attendance: 23,127; Referee: Martin Petersen

9 November 2022 14	Eintracht Frankfurt	4–2	TSG Hoffenheim	Frankfurt
20:30 CET (UTC+1)	Sow 6'; Kolo Muani 8'; Dina Ebimbe 29'; Lindstrøm 56'	Report	Baumgartner 37', (yellow card) 80'; Kabak 46'; Vogt (yellow card) 78'; Geiger (yellow card) 86'	Stadium: Deutsche Bank Park; Attendance: 49,000; Referee: Felix Zwayer

12 November 2022 15	TSG Hoffenheim	1–2	VfL Wolfsburg	Sinsheim
15:30 CET (UTC+1)	Baumgartner 42'	Report	Bornauw (yellow card) 14'; Kabak 45+4' (o.g.); Fischer (yellow card) 49'; Van de Ven (yellow card) 55'; Baku 56'	Stadium: Rhein-Neckar-Arena; Attendance: 18,014; Referee: Daniel Schlager

21 January 2023 16	Union Berlin	3–1	TSG Hoffenheim	Berlin
15:30 CET (UTC+1)	Pefok (penalty missed) 25'; Gießelmann (yellow card) 45+2'; Doekhi 73', 89'; Seguin (yellow card) 90+2'; Leweling 90+6'	Report	Bebou 43'; Kabak (yellow card) 45+3'	Stadium: Stadion An der Alten Försterei; Attendance: 21,747; Referee: Robert Hartmann

24 January 2023 17	TSG Hoffenheim	2–2	VfB Stuttgart	Sinsheim
20:30 CET (UTC+1)	Kramarić 11', 90+4'; Akpoguma (yellow card) 62'	Report	Guirassy 45+5'; Karazor (yellow card) 66'; Ahamada (yellow card) 73' (yellow-red card) 78'; Endo 77'	Stadium: Rhein-Neckar-Arena; Attendance: 23,159; Referee: Florian Badstübner

28 January 2023 18	TSG Hoffenheim	1–4	Borussia Mönchengladbach	Sinsheim
15:30 CET (UTC+1)	Angeliño (yellow card) 15'; Brooks (yellow card) 22'; Bebou 80'	Report	Hofmann 12', 36'; Koné (yellow card) 68'; Stindl 83'; Wolf 90+1'	Stadium: Rhein-Neckar-Arena; Attendance: 24,119; Referee: Benjamin Brand

4 February 2023 19	VfL Bochum	5–2	TSG Hoffenheim	Bochum
15:30 CET (UTC+1)	Hofmann 22', (yellow card) 54'; Förster 30', (yellow card) 59'; Asano 40'; Mašović 69'; Broschinski 83'	Report	Baumgartner 49', (yellow card) 56'; Rudy (yellow card) 56'; Dabbur 77', (yellow card) 90'	Stadium: Vonovia Ruhrstadion; Attendance: 23,700; Referee: Bastian Dankert

11 February 2023 20	TSG Hoffenheim	1–3	Bayer Leverkusen	Sinsheim
15:30 CET (UTC+1)	Geiger (yellow card) 28'; Brooks (yellow card) 36'; Akpoguma (yellow card) 50'; Nsoki 77'	Report	Andrich 6'; Frimpong (yellow card) 28'; Diaby 47'; Hložek 56'	Stadium: Rhein-Neckar-Arena; Attendance: 20,619; Referee: Tobias Stieler

17 February 2023 21	FC Augsburg	1–0	TSG Hoffenheim	Augsburg
20:30 CET (UTC+1)	Engels (yellow card) 35'; Berisha (yellow card) 43'; Gouweleeuw (yellow card) 49'; Jensen 88'	Report	Kabak (yellow card) 39'; Kadeřábek (yellow card) 65'; Akpoguma (yellow card) 90+5'	Stadium: WWK Arena; Attendance: 25,872; Referee: Patrick Ittrich

25 February 2023 22	TSG Hoffenheim	0–1	Borussia Dortmund	Sinsheim
15:30 CET (UTC+1)	Kabak (yellow card) 27'; Baumann (yellow card) 57'; Vogt (yellow card) 90+3'	Report	Brandt 43'; Bellingham (yellow card) 70'	Stadium: Rhein-Neckar-Arena; Attendance: 30,150; Referee: Martin Petersen

4 March 2023 23	Mainz 05	1–0	TSG Hoffenheim	Mainz
15:30 CET (UTC+1)	Barreiro 33'; Barkok (yellow card) 90+2'	Report	Geiger (yellow card) 66'; Rudy (yellow card) 81'; Baumgartner (yellow card) 85'; Vogt (yellow card) 90'	Stadium: Mewa Arena; Attendance: 28,100; Referee: Sascha Stegemann

12 March 2023 24	SC Freiburg	2–1	TSG Hoffenheim	Freiburg
15:30 CET (UTC+1)	Eggestein 5'; Höfler (yellow card) 67'; Dōan 89'; Petersen (yellow card) 90+1'	Report	Stiller 49'; Kabak (yellow card) 52' (yellow-red card) 83'; Geiger (yellow card) 73'; Brooks (yellow card) 84'; Akpoguma (yellow card) 90'	Stadium: Europa-Park Stadion; Attendance: 33,500; Referee: Harm Osmers

18 March 2023 25	TSG Hoffenheim	3–1	Hertha BSC	Sinsheim
15:30 CET (UTC+1)	Kramarić 24' (pen.), 37' (pen.); Bebou 51'; Dabbur (red card) 71'	Report	Richter (yellow card) 27'; Ngankam (yellow card) 78'; Mittelstädt (yellow card) 85'; Jovetić 90+2'	Stadium: Rhein-Neckar-Arena; Attendance: 25,027; Referee: Frank Willenborg

2 April 2023 26	Werder Bremen	1–2	TSG Hoffenheim	Bremen
17:30 CEST (UTC+2)	Schmid (yellow card) 29'; Schmidt (yellow card) 54'; Pieper 76'; Bittencourt (yellow card) 89'	Report	Kramarić 50'; Baumgartner 52', (yellow card) 63'; Bebou (yellow card) 57'; Nsoki (yellow card) 82'; Geiger (yellow card) 89'	Stadium: Wohninvest Weserstadion; Attendance: 42,000; Referee: Sascha Stegemann

9 April 2023 27	TSG Hoffenheim	2–0	Schalke 04	Sinsheim
19:30 CEST (UTC+2)	Baumgartner (yellow card) 16'; Král 22' (o.g.); Geiger (yellow card) 40'; Bebou 70' (pen.); Kabak (yellow card) 90+4'	Report		Stadium: Rhein-Neckar-Arena; Attendance: 30,150; Referee: Matthias Jöllenbeck

15 April 2023 28	Bayern Munich	1–1	TSG Hoffenheim	Munich
15:30 CEST (UTC+2)	Pavard 17', (yellow card) 57'; Upamecano (yellow card) 72'	Report	Kramarić 71'; Akpoguma (yellow card) 82'	Stadium: Allianz Arena; Attendance: 75,000; Referee: Bastian Dankert

22 April 2023 29	TSG Hoffenheim	1–3	1. FC Köln	Sinsheim
15:30 CEST (UTC+2)	Brooks (yellow card) 29'; Dolberg 90+4'	Report	Kainz 18' (pen.); Selke (yellow card) 26', (goal) 39'; Schwäbe (yellow card) 29'; Thielmann 90+2'	Stadium: Rhein-Neckar-Arena; Attendance: 30,150; Referee: Robin Braun

29 April 2023 30	RB Leipzig	1–0	TSG Hoffenheim	Leipzig
15:30 CEST (UTC+2)	Nkunku 28'	Report	Rudy (yellow card) 62'; Akpoguma (yellow card) 86'	Stadium: Red Bull Arena; Attendance: 40,000; Referee: Tobias Stieler

6 May 2023 31	TSG Hoffenheim	3–1	Eintracht Frankfurt	Sinsheim
15:30 CEST (UTC+2)	Baumgartner 8'; Kramarić 15' (pen.), (yellow card) 67'; Bebou 45+3'; Nsoki (red card) 48'; Baumann (yellow card) 84'	Report	Touré (yellow card) 15'; Götze (yellow card) 41', (goal) 54'; Trapp (yellow card) 44'; Borré (yellow card) 62'	Stadium: Rhein-Neckar-Arena; Attendance: 30,000; Referee: Harm Osmers

13 May 2023 32	VfL Wolfsburg	2–1	TSG Hoffenheim	Wolfsburg
15:30 CEST (UTC+2)	Kamiński 15'; Baku (yellow card) 31'; Guilavogui (yellow card) 49'; Waldschmidt 75'	Report	Bebou (yellow card) 51'; Akpoguma (yellow card) 88'; Guilavogui 90+3' (o.g.)	Stadium: Volkswagen Arena; Attendance: 22,617; Referee: Tobias Stieler

20 May 2023 33	TSG Hoffenheim	4–2	Union Berlin	Sinsheim
15:30 CEST (UTC+2)	Bebou 22'; Kramarić 36' (pen.), 90', (yellow card) 90+1'; Prömel (yellow card) 81'; Dabbur (yellow card) 90+8', (goal) 90+9'; Stiller (yellow card) 90+8'	Report	Leite (yellow card) 35'; Haberer (yellow card) 39'; Doekhi 45+4'; Baumgartl (yellow card) 79'; Roussillon (yellow card) 86'; Becker (yellow card) 87'; Laïdouni 90+5'	Stadium: Rhein-Neckar-Arena; Attendance: 30,000; Referee: Christian Dingert

27 May 2023 34	VfB Stuttgart	1–1	TSG Hoffenheim	Stuttgart
15:30 CEST (UTC+2)	Tomás 80'	Report	Bebou 75'	Stadium: Mercedes-Benz Arena; Attendance: 47,500; Referee: Robert Schröder

=== DFB-Pokal ===
31 July 2022 First round	SV Rödinghausen	0–2 (a.e.t.)	TSG Hoffenheim	Rödinghausen
15:31 CEST (UTC+2)	Riemer (yellow card) 65'; Kurzen (yellow card) 71'; Hoffmeier (yellow card) 81'; Fehr (yellow card) 92'; Choroba (yellow card) 105'	Report	Posch (yellow card) 11'; Rudy (yellow card) 52'; Vogt (yellow card) 77'; Kabak 115'; Prömel 118'	Stadium: Häcker Wiehenstadion; Attendance: 10,000; Referee: Robin Braun

18 October 2022 Second round	TSG Hoffenheim	5–1	Schalke 04	Sinsheim
20:45 CEST (UTC+2)	Dabbur 5', 43'; Angeliño 16'; Kabak 51'; Kadeřábek 63'	Report	Matriciani (yellow card) 42'; Drexler 69'; Larsson (yellow card) 73'; Flick (yellow card) 78'	Stadium: PreZero Arena; Attendance: 15,633; Referee: Matthias Jöllenbeck

1 February 2023 Round of 16	RB Leipzig	3–1	TSG Hoffenheim	Leipzig
18:00 CET (UTC+1)	Forsberg 8'; Laimer 41'; Werner 83'	Report	Angeliño (yellow card) 34'; Tohumcu (yellow card) 40'; Nsoki (yellow card) 58' (yellow-red card) 86'; Dolberg 76'	Stadium: Red Bull Arena; Attendance: 34,822; Referee: Christian Dingert

== Statistics ==
=== Appearances and goals ===
No.	Pos	Nat	Player	Total		Bundesliga		DFB-Pokal	
No.	Pos	Nat	Player	Apps	Goals	Apps	Goals	Apps	Goals
Goalkeepers
1	GK	(Germany) GER	Oliver Baumann	37	0	34	0	3	0
12	GK	(Germany) GER	Philipp Pentke	0	0	0	0	0	0
36	GK	(Germany) GER	Nahuel Noel	0	0	0	0	0	0
37	GK	(Germany) GER	Luca Philipp	0	0	0	0	0	0
Defenders
3	DF	(Czech Republic) CZE	Pavel Kadeřábek	28	2	17+9	1	1+1	1
4	DF	(Bosnia and Herzegovina) BIH	Ermin Bičakčić	9	0	0+9	0	0	0
5	DF	(Turkey) TUR	Ozan Kabak	33	4	28+2	2	2+1	2
11	DF	(Spain) ESP	Angeliño	35	1	30+3	0	2	1
22	DF	(Germany) GER	Kevin Vogt	24	0	22	0	2	0
23	DF	(United States) USA	John Brooks	16	0	15	0	1	0
24	DF	(United States) USA	Justin Che	1	0	0	0	0+1	0
25	DF	(Nigeria) NGR	Kevin Akpoguma	30	0	21+7	0	1+1	0
26	DF	(Portugal) POR	Eduardo Quaresma	4	0	1+3	0	0	0
34	DF	(France) FRA	Stanley Nsoki	21	1	14+5	1	2	0
48	DF	(Germany) GER	Joshua Quarshie	1	0	0+1	0	0	0
Midfielders
6	MF	(Germany) GER	Grischa Prömel	20	2	17+1	1	2	1
8	MF	(Germany) GER	Dennis Geiger	28	1	27	1	1	0
13	MF	(Germany) GER	Angelo Stiller	21	1	6+14	1	0+1	0
14	MF	(Austria) AUT	Christoph Baumgartner	36	7	33	7	3	0
16	MF	(Germany) GER	Sebastian Rudy	23	0	6+16	0	0+1	0
17	MF	(Denmark) DEN	Thomas Delaney	7	0	4+2	0	0+1	0
20	MF	(Germany) GER	Finn Ole Becker	14	0	6+7	0	0+1	0
35	MF	(Germany) GER	Muhammed Damar	6	0	1+5	0	0	0
39	MF	(Germany) GER	Tom Bischof	14	0	3+8	0	0+3	0
40	MF	(Germany) GER	Umut Tohumcu	9	0	2+6	0	1	0
Forwards
7	FW	(Denmark) DEN	Jacob Bruun Larsen	14	1	3+9	1	1+1	0
9	FW	(Togo) TOG	Ihlas Bebou	20	7	17+2	7	1	0
10	FW	(Israel) ISR	Mu'nas Dabbur	24	8	8+13	6	2+1	2
19	FW	(Denmark) DEN	Kasper Dolberg	14	2	4+9	1	0+1	1
27	FW	(Croatia) CRO	Andrej Kramarić	34	12	26+6	12	2	0
29	FW	(Denmark) DEN	Robert Skov	25	3	16+7	3	2	0
44	FW	(Germany) GER	Fisnik Asllani	8	0	0+8	0	0	0
Players transferred out during the season
18	MF	(Mali) MLI	Diadie Samassékou	3	0	1+1	0	1	0
21	DF	(Germany) GER	Benjamin Hübner	1	0	0	0	1	0
30	MF	(Germany) GER	Marco John	0	0	0	0	0	0
32	DF	(Netherlands) NED	Melayro Bogarde	0	0	0	0	0	0
33	FW	(France) FRA	Georginio Rutter	17	2	11+4	2	1+1	0
38	DF	(Austria) AUT	Stefan Posch	2	0	1	0	1	0

Last updated: 27 May 2023
Source: Competitions

=== Goalscorers ===
Rank	Pos	No.	Nat	Name	Bundesliga	DFB-Pokal	Total
1	FW	10	(Israel)	Mu'nas Dabbur	5	2	7
2	MF	14	(Austria)	Christoph Baumgartner	5	0	5
2	FW	27	(Croatia)	Andrej Kramarić	5	0	5
4	DF	5	(Turkey)	Ozan Kabak	2	2	4
5	FW	29	(Denmark)	Robert Skov	3	0	3
6	DF	3	(Czech Republic)	Pavel Kadeřábek	1	1	2
6	MF	6	(Germany)	Grischa Prömel	1	1	2
6	FW	9	(Togo)	Ihlas Bebou	2	0	2
6	FW	33	(France)	Georginio Rutter	2	0	2
10	FW	7	(Denmark)	Jacob Bruun Larsen	1	0	1
10	MF	8	(Germany)	Dennis Geiger	1	0	1
10	DF	11	(Spain)	Angeliño	0	1	1
10	FW	19	(Denmark)	Kasper Dolberg	0	1	1
10	DF	34	(France)	Stanley Nsoki	1	0	1
Own goals					0	0	0
Totals					29	8	37

Last updated: 11 February 2023
