= Ozan Kabak =

Turkish footballer (born 2000)

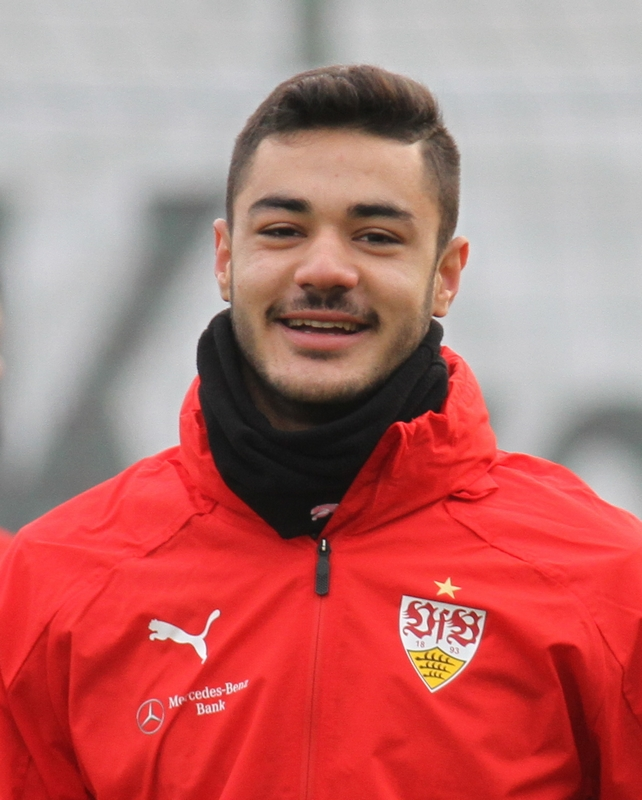
- Kabak training with VfB Stuttgart in 2019

Personal information
- Full name: Ozan Muhammed Kabak
- Date of birth: 25 March 2000 (age 26)
- Place of birth: Ankara, Turkey
- Height: 1.87 m (6 ft 2 in)
- Position: Centre-back

Team information
- Current team: TSG Hoffenheim
- Number: 5

Youth career
- 2011–2017: Galatasaray

Senior career*
Years	Team	Apps	(Gls)
2018–2019	Galatasaray	14	(0)
2019	VfB Stuttgart	15	(3)
2019–2022	Schalke 04	40	(3)
2021	→ Liverpool (loan)	9	(0)
2021–2022	→ Norwich City (loan)	11	(0)
2022–	TSG Hoffenheim	91	(11)

International career^{‡}
2015	Turkey U15	7	(1)
2015–2016	Turkey U16	15	(5)
2016–2017	Turkey U17	15	(3)
2018	Turkey U18	11	(4)
2019–	Turkey	34	(2)
- * Club domestic league appearances and goals as of 31 October 2026 ‡ National team caps and goals as of 15 November 2026

Ozan Muhammed Kabak (born 25 March 2000) is a Turkish professional footballer who plays as a centre-back for Bundesliga club TSG Hoffenheim and the Turkey national team.

== Early life ==
Kabak was born in Ankara, where his father was working at the time, although his family is from Derik, Mardin Province. In a 2026 interview with KAFA Sports, he said that he grew up with Kurdish music at home and described himself as a fan of Kurdish music.

== Club career ==
=== Galatasaray ===
Ozan trained with the Galatasaray youth academy, joining in 2011. He signed his first professional contract with Galatasaray on 1 July 2017. Ozan made his professional debut for Galatasaray in a 2–0 Süper Lig win over Yeni Malatyaspor on 12 May 2018. This made him the first footballer born in the 2000s to play in the Süper Lig. On 24 October 2018, he played his first Champions League match in a 0–0 home draw against Schalke 04 in the 2018–19 season.

=== VfB Stuttgart ===
On 17 January 2019, Kabak moved to Bundesliga side VfB Stuttgart where he signed a contract until June 2024. On 3 March, he scored twice in a 5–1 win over Hannover 96, registering his first senior career goals. In doing so, at the age of 18 years, 11 months and 7 days, he became the youngest Turkish center-back, and third-youngest Stuttgart player to ever score twice in a single Bundesliga match.

=== Schalke 04 ===
On 30 June 2019, Kabak joined Schalke 04 on a five-year contract for a fee of €15 million, after Schalke activated a release clause in his contract. He was a regular performer in his first season with the club, appearing in 28 matches and scoring three goals. In September 2020, he was banned for five games and hit with a €15,000 fine after being caught spitting at Werder Bremen's Ludwig Augustinsson. Kabak apologised to Augustinsson via Twitter afterwards, insisting the incident, for which he was shown a red card, was an accident.

==== Liverpool (loan) ====
On 1 February 2021, Kabak signed for Liverpool on loan for the remainder of the 2020–21 season. The deal was reportedly worth £1 million, plus potentially £500,000 in add-ons depending on appearances and Liverpool's performance in the Champions League. It also included an option to buy, which was set at approximately £18 million and could rise to £26.5m with add-ons. On 13 February 2021, he made his Liverpool debut in a Premier League game against Leicester City, ending in a 1–3 away defeat. On 16 February, he played in a 2–0 away win over RB Leipzig in the 2020–21 UEFA Champions League, becoming the first Turkish player to appear for an English club in the competition. At the end of the season, Liverpool declined to sign Kabak on a permanent basis.

==== Norwich City (loan) ====
On 30 August 2021, Kabak returned to England to join newly promoted Norwich City on a season-long loan deal with the club having an option to make the deal permanent at the end of the season.

=== TSG Hoffenheim ===
On 23 July 2022, Kabak moved to TSG Hoffenheim and signed a contract until 30 June 2026. He also has a clause where it shows he could earn up to 8 million in add ons.

== International career ==
Ozan is a youth international for Turkey. He captained the Turkey U17s at the 2017 UEFA European Under-17 Championship, and was listed as one of the 10 players to watch by UEFA.

On 17 November 2019, Kabak made his debut in the Turkey senior team during the team's UEFA Euro 2020 qualifying match against Andorra, playing the full match which Turkey won 2–0. Kabak scored his first international goal on 16 November 2022 in a 2–1 friendly win over Scotland.

On 24 May 2024, Kabak was named in the 35-man preliminary squad for the UEFA Euro 2024. On 5 June, he was withdrawn due to knee injury prior to the tournament.

On 2 June 2026, Kabak was selected in the 26-man squad for the 2026 FIFA World Cup.

== Career statistics ==
=== Club ===
As of match played 31 October 2026

Appearances and goals by club, season and competition
Club	Season	League			National cup		League cup		Europe		Other		Total	
Club	Season	Division	Apps	Goals	Apps	Goals	Apps	Goals	Apps	Goals	Apps	Goals	Apps	Goals
Galatasaray	2017–18	Süper Lig	1	0	0	0	—		0	0	—		1	0
Galatasaray	2018–19	Süper Lig	13	0	0	0	—		4 (Note: Appearances in UEFA Champions League)	0	—		17	0
Galatasaray	Total		14	0	0	0	—		4	0	—		18	0
VfB Stuttgart	2018–19	Bundesliga	15	3	—		—		—		2 (Note: Appearances in Bundesliga relegation play-offs)	0	17	3
Schalke 04	2019–20	Bundesliga	26	3	2	0	—		—		—		28	3
Schalke 04	2020–21	Bundesliga	14	0	0	0	—		—		—		14	0
Schalke 04	Total		40	3	2	0	—		—		—		42	3
Liverpool (loan)	2020–21	Premier League	9	0	—		—		4	0	—		13	0
Norwich City (loan)	2021–22	Premier League	11	0	1	0	0	0	—		—		12	0
TSG Hoffenheim	2022–23	Bundesliga	30	2	3	2	—		—		—		33	4
TSG Hoffenheim	2023–24	Bundesliga	28	4	2	0	—		—		—		30	4
TSG Hoffenheim	2025–26	Bundesliga	25	4	1	0	—		—		—		26	4
TSG Hoffenheim	2026–27	Bundesliga	8	1	1	0	—		3 (Note: Appearances in UEFA Europa League)	0	—		12	1
TSG Hoffenheim	Total		91	11	7	2	—		3	0	—		101	13
Career total			180	17	9	2	0	0	11	0	2	0	203	19

=== International ===
As of match played 15 November 2026

Appearances and goals by national team and year
National team	Year	Apps	Goals
Turkey	2019	1	0
Turkey	2020	6	0
Turkey	2021	6	0
Turkey	2022	7	1
Turkey	2023	4	1
Turkey	2024	2	0
Turkey	2026	8	0
Total		34	2

Scores and results list Turkey's goal tally first, score column indicates score after each Kabak goal.

List of international goals scored by Ozan Kabak
No.	Date	Venue	Opponent	Score	Result	Competition
1.	16 November 2022	Diyarbakır Stadium, Diyarbakır, Turkey	Scotland	1–0	2–1	Friendly
2.	12 September 2023	Cegeka Arena, Genk, Belgium	Japan	1–3	2–4	Friendly

== Honours ==
Galatasaray

- Süper Lig: 2017–18

Individual

- Bundesliga Rookie of the Season: 2018–19
