= 2020–21 Bundesliga =

58th season of Bundesliga

Bundesliga
- Season: 2020–21
- Dates: 18 September 2020 – 22 May 2021
- Champions: Bayern Munich; 30th Bundesliga title 31st German title
- Relegated: Werder Bremen; Schalke 04
- Champions League: Bayern Munich; RB Leipzig; Borussia Dortmund; VfL Wolfsburg
- Europa League: Eintracht Frankfurt; Bayer Leverkusen
- Europa Conference League: Union Berlin
- Matches: 306
- Goals: 928 (3.03 per match)
- Top goalscorer: Robert Lewandowski (41 goals)
- Biggest home win: Munich 8–0 Schalke
- Biggest away win: Dortmund 1–5 Stuttgart; Köln 0–4 Leverkusen; Schalke 0–4 Munich; Bielefeld 1–5 Frankfurt; Schalke 0–4 Dortmund
- Highest scoring: Munich 8–0 Schalke; Wolfsburg 5–3 Bremen
- Longest winning run: 7 games Dortmund
- Longest unbeaten run: 12 games Leverkusen; Munich
- Longest winless run: 14 games Schalke
- Longest losing run: 7 games Bielefeld; Bremen
- Attendance: 160,321 (524 per match) (Note: Due to the COVID-19 pandemic in Germany, each local health department allowed a different number of spectators.)

The 2020–21 Bundesliga was the 58th season of the Bundesliga, Germany's premier football competition. It began on 18 September 2020 and concluded on 22 May 2021. The season was originally scheduled to begin on 21 August 2020 and conclude on 15 May 2021, though this was delayed due to postponement of the previous season as a result of the COVID-19 pandemic. The fixtures were announced on 7 August 2020.

Bayern Munich were the defending champions and successfully defended their title, winning their record-extending 9th consecutive title and 31st title overall (30th in the Bundesliga era) on 8 May with three games to spare. By winning their thirtieth Bundesliga title, Bayern Munich are honoured with a fifth gold star on their team badges and shirts.

Bayern's Robert Lewandowski set a new record for goals scored in a season with 41, surpassing the previous record of 40 goals set by Gerd Müller in 1971–72.

== Effects of the COVID-19 pandemic ==
On 3 September 2020, the DFL General Assembly voted to extend the use of five substitutions in matches to the 2020–21 season, which was implemented at the end of the previous season to lessen the impact of fixture congestion caused by the COVID-19 pandemic. The use of five substitutes, based on the decision of competition organisers, had been extended by IFAB until 2021. Due to the COVID-19 pandemic, the season began with matches behind closed doors or at reduced capacity due to restrictions across German states. Leipzig allowed up to 8,500 spectators to begin the season, while regulations in Berlin allowed for up to 5,000 supporters.

== Summary ==
Bayern Munich began the season less than a month after defeating Paris Saint-Germain in the Champions League final, as the match had been delayed due to the COVID-19 pandemic. In their first game, they beat Schalke 04 8–0, and were the dominant side early on in the season. After a 3–2 away victory over title contenders Borussia Dortmund in November, many pundits praised Bayern as the best team in Europe. This praise continued all season long, with former Bayern manager Pep Guardiola proclaiming them the best club in Europe in March. Bayern mathematically confirmed their ninth consecutive Bundesliga title on 8 May 2021 with three matches to spare, following closest contender RB Leipzig's 2–3 loss to Dortmund. The title was Bayern's 30th Bundesliga and 31st German championship overall, which would see them add a fifth star to their badge in the following season.

Meanwhile, Schalke 04 endured a disaster season, failing to win a game in nine consecutive months dating back to the previous season, before defeating a fourth-tier club in the German Cup. They failed to win thirty Bundesliga matches in a row, falling one short of the all-time record set by Tasmania Berlin in 1965–66, before a 4–0 win against 1899 Hoffenheim in January. Schalke had announced before the season that they had debts of over 200 million, which led them to slash spending. The poor results led to departures for executives and managers. Former Schalke star Klaas-Jan Huntelaar returned to Schalke from Ajax in January in an attempt to stave off relegation, but he was unable to prevent Schalke from being relegated for the first time in over thirty years.

A hot start to the season for Robert Lewandowski led to early talk that he could break Gerd Müller's 49-year-old record of 40 goals scored in one Bundesliga season, with teammate Thomas Müller suggesting it could happen back in October. Lewandowski capped off a successful year in December by winning his first FIFA Men's Player of the Year award. As Lewandowski continued his strong performances, interest in him overtaking Müller's record grew from various media outlets. However, a knee injury suffered whilst on international duty on 31 March threatened Lewandowski's record-chase and kept him out of action for a month. Lewandowski returned to action in April, just five goals away from equalling the single-season goal record. On 15 May 2021, Lewandowski scored his 40th goal of the season against SC Freiburg with one match to spare, therefore equalling Gerd Müller's record tally from 1971–72. In the last match of the season the following week, Lewandowski scored his 41st league goal in the final minute of the match against FC Augsburg to break Müller's record.

== Teams ==
Locations of the 2020–21 Bundesliga teams

A total of 18 teams participated in the 2020–21 edition of the Bundesliga.

=== Team changes ===
Promoted from 2019–20 2. Bundesliga	Relegated from 2019–20 Bundesliga
Arminia Bielefeld; VfB Stuttgart	Fortuna Düsseldorf; SC Paderborn

=== Stadiums and locations ===
Team	Location	Stadium	Capacity	Ref.
FC Augsburg	Augsburg	WWK Arena	30,660	
Hertha BSC	Berlin	Olympiastadion	74,649	
Union Berlin	Berlin	Stadion An der Alten Försterei	22,012	
Arminia Bielefeld	Bielefeld	Schüco-Arena	27,300	
Werder Bremen	Bremen	Wohninvest Weserstadion	42,100	
Borussia Dortmund	Dortmund	Signal Iduna Park	81,365	
Eintracht Frankfurt	Frankfurt	Deutsche Bank Park	51,500	
SC Freiburg	Freiburg im Breisgau	Schwarzwald-Stadion	24,000	
1899 Hoffenheim	Sinsheim	PreZero Arena	30,150	
1. FC Köln	Cologne	RheinEnergieStadion	49,698	
RB Leipzig	Leipzig	Red Bull Arena	42,558	
Bayer Leverkusen	Leverkusen	BayArena	30,210	
Mainz 05	Mainz	Opel Arena	34,000	
Borussia Mönchengladbach	Mönchengladbach	Borussia-Park	54,057	
Bayern Munich	Munich	Allianz Arena	75,000	
Schalke 04	Gelsenkirchen	Veltins-Arena	62,271	
VfB Stuttgart	Stuttgart	Mercedes-Benz Arena	60,449	
VfL Wolfsburg	Wolfsburg	Volkswagen Arena	30,000	

=== Personnel and kits ===
Team	Manager	Captain	Kit manufacturer	Shirt sponsor	
Team	Manager	Captain	Kit manufacturer	Front	Sleeve
FC Augsburg	(Germany) Markus Weinzierl	(Netherlands) Jeffrey Gouweleeuw	Nike	WWK	Siegmund
Hertha BSC	(Hungary) Pál Dárdai	(Belgium) Dedryck Boyata	Nike	Homeday	Hyundai
Union Berlin	(Switzerland) Urs Fischer	(Austria) Christopher Trimmel	Adidas	Aroundtown	wefox
Arminia Bielefeld	(Germany) Frank Kramer	(Germany) Fabian Klos	Macron	Schüco	JAB Anstoetz Textilien
Werder Bremen	(Germany) Thomas Schaaf	(Finland) Niklas Moisander	Umbro	Wiesenhof	188bet
Borussia Dortmund	(Germany) Edin Terzić (interim)	(Germany) Marco Reus	Puma	1&1/Evonik (in cup and UEFA matches)	Opel
Eintracht Frankfurt	(Austria) Adi Hütter	(Japan) Makoto Hasebe	Nike	Indeed.com	dpd
SC Freiburg	(Germany) Christian Streich	(Germany) Christian Günter	Hummel	Schwarzwaldmilch	ROSE Bikes
1899 Hoffenheim	(Germany) Sebastian Hoeneß	(Germany) Benjamin Hübner	Joma	SAP	SNP
1. FC Köln	(Germany) Friedhelm Funkel	(Germany) Jonas Hector	Uhlsport	REWE	DEVK
RB Leipzig	(Germany) Julian Nagelsmann	(Austria) Marcel Sabitzer	Nike	Red Bull	CG Immobilien
Bayer Leverkusen	(Germany) Hannes Wolf (interim)	(Chile) Charles Aránguiz	Jako	Barmenia Versicherungen	Kieser Training
Mainz 05	(Denmark) Bo Svensson	(Germany) Danny Latza	Kappa	Kömmerling	fb88.com
Borussia Mönchengladbach	(Germany) Marco Rose	(Germany) Lars Stindl	Puma	flatex/DEGIRO (in UEFA matches)	Sonepar
Bayern Munich	(Germany) Hansi Flick	(Germany) Manuel Neuer	Adidas	Deutsche Telekom	Qatar Airways
Schalke 04	(Greece) Dimitris Grammozis	(Bosnia and Herzegovina) Sead Kolašinac	Umbro	Gazprom	Harfid
VfB Stuttgart	(United States) Pellegrino Matarazzo	(Germany) Gonzalo Castro	Jako	Mercedes-Benz Bank	Mercedes-EQ
VfL Wolfsburg	(Austria) Oliver Glasner	(France) Josuha Guilavogui	Nike	Volkswagen	Linglong Tire

=== Managerial changes ===
Team	Outgoing	Manner	Exit date		Position in table	Incoming	Incoming date		Ref.
Team	Outgoing	Manner	Announced on	Departed on	Position in table	Incoming	Announced on	Arrived on	Ref.
1899 Hoffenheim	(Germany) Matthias Kaltenbach (Germany) Marcel Rapp (Germany) Kai Herdling (interim)	End of caretaker spell	9 June 2020	30 June 2020	Pre-season	(Germany) Sebastian Hoeneß	27 July 2020		
Schalke 04	(United States) David Wagner	Sacked	27 September 2020		18th	(Germany) Manuel Baum	30 September 2020		
Mainz 05	(Germany) Achim Beierlorzer	Sacked	28 September 2020		17th	(Germany) Jan-Moritz Lichte (interim)	28 September 2020		
Borussia Dortmund	(Switzerland) Lucien Favre	Sacked	13 December 2020		5th	(Germany) Edin Terzić (interim)	13 December 2020		
Schalke 04	(Germany) Manuel Baum	Sacked	18 December 2020		18th	(Netherlands) Huub Stevens (interim)	18 December 2020		
Schalke 04	(Netherlands) Huub Stevens (interim)	End of caretaker spell	22 December 2020		18th	(Switzerland) Christian Gross	27 December 2020		
Mainz 05	(Germany) Jan-Moritz Lichte (interim)	Sacked	28 December 2020		17th	(Germany) Jan Siewert (interim)	28 December 2020		
Mainz 05	(Germany) Jan Siewert (interim)	End of caretaker spell	4 January 2021		17th	(Denmark) Bo Svensson	4 January 2021		
Hertha BSC	(Germany) Bruno Labbadia	Sacked	24 January 2021		13th	(Hungary) Pál Dárdai	25 January 2021		
Schalke 04	(Switzerland) Christian Gross	Sacked	28 February 2021		18th	(Greece) Dimitris Grammozis	2 March 2021		
Arminia Bielefeld	(Germany) Uwe Neuhaus	Sacked	1 March 2021		16th	(Germany) Frank Kramer	2 March 2021		
Bayer Leverkusen	(Netherlands) Peter Bosz	Sacked	23 March 2021		6th	(Germany) Hannes Wolf (interim)	23 March 2021		
1. FC Köln	(Germany) Markus Gisdol	Sacked	11 April 2021		17th	(Germany) Friedhelm Funkel	12 April 2021		
FC Augsburg	(Germany) Heiko Herrlich	Sacked	26 April 2021		13th	(Germany) Markus Weinzierl	26 April 2021		
Werder Bremen	(Germany) Florian Kohfeldt	Sacked	16 May 2021		16th	(Germany) Thomas Schaaf (interim)	16 May 2021		

== League table ==
Pos	Team	Pld	W	D	L	GF	GA	GD	Pts	Qualification or relegation
1	Bayern Munich (C)	34	24	6	4	99	44	+55	78	Qualification for the Champions League group stage
2	RB Leipzig	34	19	8	7	60	32	+28	65	Qualification for the Champions League group stage
3	Borussia Dortmund	34	20	4	10	75	46	+29	64	Qualification for the Champions League group stage
4	VfL Wolfsburg	34	17	10	7	61	37	+24	61	Qualification for the Champions League group stage
5	Eintracht Frankfurt	34	16	12	6	69	53	+16	60	Qualification for the Europa League group stage (Note: Since the winners of the 2020–21 DFB-Pokal, Borussia Dortmund, qualified for the Champions League based on league position, the Europa League group stage spot was passed to the sixth-placed team, and the Europa Conference League play-off round spot was passed to the seventh-placed team.)
6	Bayer Leverkusen	34	14	10	10	53	39	+14	52	Qualification for the Europa League group stage
7	Union Berlin	34	12	14	8	50	43	+7	50	Qualification for the Europa Conference League play-off round
8	Borussia Mönchengladbach	34	13	10	11	64	56	+8	49	
9	VfB Stuttgart	34	12	9	13	56	55	+1	45	
10	SC Freiburg	34	12	9	13	52	52	0	45	
11	1899 Hoffenheim	34	11	10	13	52	54	−2	43	
12	Mainz 05	34	10	9	15	39	56	−17	39	
13	FC Augsburg	34	10	6	18	36	54	−18	36	
14	Hertha BSC	34	8	11	15	41	52	−11	35	
15	Arminia Bielefeld	34	9	8	17	26	52	−26	35	
16	1. FC Köln (O)	34	8	9	17	34	60	−26	33	Qualification for the relegation play-offs
17	Werder Bremen (R)	34	7	10	17	36	57	−21	31	Relegation to 2. Bundesliga
18	Schalke 04 (R)	34	3	7	24	25	86	−61	16	Relegation to 2. Bundesliga

Source: DFB
Rules for classification: 1) Points; 2) Goal difference; 3) Goals scored; 4) Head-to-head results; 5) Head-to-head away goals scored; 6) Away goals scored; 7) Play-off.
(C) Champions; (O) Play-off winners; (R) Relegated

== Results ==
Home \ Away	AUG	BSC	UNB	BIE	BRE	DOR	FRA	FRE	HOF	KÖL	LEI	LEV	MAI	MÖN	MUN	SCH	STU	WOL
FC Augsburg	—	0–3	2–1	0–0	2–0	2–0	0–2	1–1	2–1	2–3	0–2	1–1	3–1	3–1	0–1	2–2	1–4	0–2
Hertha BSC	2–1	—	3–1	0–0	1–4	2–5	1–3	3–0	0–3	0–0	0–3	3–0	0–0	2–2	0–1	3–0	0–2	1–1
Union Berlin	1–3	1–1	—	5–0	3–1	2–1	3–3	1–1	1–1	2–1	2–1	1–0	4–0	1–1	1–1	0–0	2–1	2–2
Arminia Bielefeld	0–1	1–0	0–0	—	0–2	0–2	1–5	1–0	1–1	1–0	0–1	1–2	2–1	0–1	1–4	1–0	3–0	0–3
Werder Bremen	2–0	1–4	0–2	1–0	—	1–2	2–1	0–0	1–1	1–1	1–4	0–0	0–1	2–4	1–3	1–1	1–2	1–2
Borussia Dortmund	3–1	2–0	2–0	3–0	4–1	—	1–2	4–0	2–2	1–2	3–2	3–1	1–1	3–0	2–3	3–0	1–5	2–0
Eintracht Frankfurt	2–0	3–1	5–2	1–1	1–1	1–1	—	3–1	2–1	2–0	1–1	2–1	1–1	3–3	2–1	3–1	1–1	4–3
SC Freiburg	2–0	4–1	0–1	2–0	1–1	2–1	2–2	—	1–1	5–0	0–3	2–4	1–3	2–2	2–2	4–0	2–1	1–1
1899 Hoffenheim	3–1	2–1	1–3	0–0	4–0	0–1	1–3	1–3	—	3–0	0–1	0–0	1–2	3–2	4–1	4–2	3–3	2–1
1. FC Köln	0–1	0–0	1–2	3–1	1–1	2–2	1–1	1–4	2–3	—	2–1	0–4	2–3	1–3	1–2	1–0	0–1	2–2
RB Leipzig	2–1	2–1	1–0	2–1	2–0	1–3	1–1	3–0	0–0	0–0	—	1–0	3–1	3–2	0–1	4–0	2–0	2–2
Bayer Leverkusen	3–1	0–0	1–1	1–2	1–1	2–1	3–1	1–2	4–1	3–0	1–1	—	2–2	4–3	1–2	2–1	5–2	0–1
Mainz 05	0–1	1–1	1–0	1–1	0–1	1–3	0–2	1–0	1–1	0–1	3–2	0–1	—	2–3	2–1	2–2	1–4	0–2
Borussia Mönchengladbach	1–1	1–1	1–1	5–0	1–0	4–2	4–0	2–1	1–2	1–2	1–0	0–1	1–2	—	3–2	4–1	1–2	1–1
Bayern Munich	5–2	4–3	1–1	3–3	1–1	4–2	5–0	2–1	4–1	5–1	3–3	2–0	5–2	6–0	—	8–0	4–0	2–1
Schalke 04	1–0	1–2	1–1	0–1	1–3	0–4	4–3	0–2	4–0	1–2	0–3	0–3	0–0	0–3	0–4	—	1–1	0–2
VfB Stuttgart	2–1	1–1	2–2	0–2	1–0	2–3	2–2	2–3	2–0	1–1	0–1	1–1	2–0	2–2	1–3	5–1	—	1–3
VfL Wolfsburg	0–0	2–0	3–0	2–1	5–3	0–2	2–1	3–0	2–1	1–0	2–2	0–0	2–3	0–0	2–3	5–0	1–0	—

Source: DFB
Legend: Blue = home team win; Yellow = draw; Red = away team win.

== Relegation play-offs ==
All times are CEST (UTC+2).

=== Overview ===
Team 1	Agg.	Team 2	1st leg	2nd leg
1. FC Köln (B)	5–2	Holstein Kiel (2B)	0–1	5–1

=== Matches ===
26 May 2021
18:30

1. FC Köln	0–1	Holstein Kiel
	Report	Lorenz 59'

RheinEnergieStadion, Cologne
Attendance: 0 (Note: The relegation play-offs are being played behind closed doors due to the COVID-19 pandemic in Germany.)
Referee: Felix Zwayer
29 May 2021
18:00

Holstein Kiel	1–5	1. FC Köln
Lee 4'	Report	Hector 3'; Andersson 6', 13'; Czichos 39'; Skhiri 84'

Holstein-Stadion, Kiel
Attendance: 2,334
Referee: Deniz Aytekin

1. FC Köln won 5–2 on aggregate, and therefore both clubs remained in their respective leagues.

== Statistics ==
=== Top scorers ===
Rank	Player	Club	Goals
1	(Poland) Robert Lewandowski	Bayern Munich	41
2	(Portugal) André Silva	Eintracht Frankfurt	28
3	(Norway) Erling Haaland	Borussia Dortmund	27
4	(Croatia) Andrej Kramarić	1899 Hoffenheim	20
4	(Netherlands) Wout Weghorst	VfL Wolfsburg	20
6	(Austria) Saša Kalajdžić	VfB Stuttgart	16
7	(Germany) Lars Stindl	Borussia Mönchengladbach	14
8	(Argentina) Lucas Alario	Bayer Leverkusen	11
8	(Germany) Max Kruse	Union Berlin	11
8	(Germany) Thomas Müller	Bayern Munich	11
8	(Democratic Republic of the Congo) Silas	VfB Stuttgart	11

=== Hat-tricks ===
Player	Club	Against	Result	Date
(Germany) Serge Gnabry	Bayern Munich	Schalke 04	8–0 (H)	18 September 2020
(Croatia) Andrej Kramarić	1899 Hoffenheim	1. FC Köln	3–2 (A)	19 September 2020
(Germany) Niclas Füllkrug	Werder Bremen	Schalke 04	3–1 (A)	26 September 2020
(Poland) Robert Lewandowski^{4}	Bayern Munich	Hertha BSC	4–3 (H)	4 October 2020
(Poland) Robert Lewandowski	Bayern Munich	Eintracht Frankfurt	5–0 (H)	24 October 2020
(Norway) Erling Haaland^{4}	Borussia Dortmund	Hertha BSC	5–2 (A)	21 November 2020
(France) Jean-Philippe Mateta	Mainz 05	SC Freiburg	3–1 (A)	22 November 2020
(Germany) Lars Stindl	Borussia Mönchengladbach	Eintracht Frankfurt	3–3 (A)	15 December 2020
(United States) Matthew Hoppe	Schalke 04	1899 Hoffenheim	4–0 (H)	9 January 2021
(Poland) Robert Lewandowski	Bayern Munich	Borussia Dortmund	4–2 (H)	6 March 2021
(Poland) Robert Lewandowski	Bayern Munich	VfB Stuttgart	4–0 (H)	20 March 2021
(Finland) Joel Pohjanpalo	Union Berlin	Werder Bremen	3–1 (H)	24 April 2021
(Croatia) Josip Brekalo	VfL Wolfsburg	Union Berlin	3–0 (H)	8 May 2021
(Poland) Robert Lewandowski	Bayern Munich	Borussia Mönchengladbach	6–0 (H)	8 May 2021

- ^{4} Player scored four goals.

=== Assist providers ===
Rank	Player	Club	Assists
1	(Germany) Thomas Müller	Bayern Munich	18
2	(Serbia) Filip Kostić	Eintracht Frankfurt	14
3	(Japan) Daichi Kamada	Eintracht Frankfurt	12
4	(Germany) Jonas Hofmann	Borussia Mönchengladbach	11
4	(England) Jadon Sancho	Borussia Dortmund	11
6	(Portugal) Raphaël Guirreiro	Borussia Dortmund	10
6	(Germany) Joshua Kimmich	Bayern Munich	10
6	(France) Kingsley Coman	Bayern Munich	10
6	(France) Moussa Diaby	Bayer Leverkusen	10
6	(Italy) Vincenzo Grifo	SC Freiburg	10

=== Clean sheets ===
Rank	Player	Club	Clean sheets
1	(Hungary) Péter Gulácsi	RB Leipzig	15
2	(Belgium) Koen Casteels	VfL Wolfsburg	14
3	(Germany) Stefan Ortega	Arminia Bielefeld	11
4	(Germany) Manuel Neuer	Bayern Munich	9
5	(Finland) Lukáš Hrádecký	Bayer Leverkusen	8
5	(Germany) Alexander Schwolow	Hertha BSC	8
7	(Poland) Rafał Gikiewicz	FC Augsburg	7
7	(Switzerland) Marwin Hitz	Borussia Dortmund	7
9	(Germany) Oliver Baumann	1899 Hoffenheim	6
9	(Germany) Florian Müller	SC Freiburg	6
9	(Czech Republic) Jiří Pavlenka	Werder Bremen	6
9	(Switzerland) Yann Sommer	Borussia Mönchengladbach	6

== Awards ==
=== Monthly awards ===
Month	Player of the Month		Rookie of the Month		Goal of the Month		Ref.
Month	Player	Club	Player	Club	Player	Club	Ref.
September	(Croatia) Andrej Kramarić	1899 Hoffenheim	(England) Jude Bellingham	Borussia Dortmund	(Germany) Joshua Kimmich	Bayern Munich	
October	(Poland) Robert Lewandowski	Bayern Munich	(Germany) Mateo Klimowicz	VfB Stuttgart	(Denmark) Yussuf Poulsen	RB Leipzig	
November	(Norway) Erling Haaland	Borussia Dortmund	(Democratic Republic of the Congo) Silas	VfB Stuttgart	(Austria) Valentino Lazaro	Borussia Mönchengladbach	
December	(Germany) Lars Stindl	Borussia Mönchengladbach	(Democratic Republic of the Congo) Silas	VfB Stuttgart	(Jamaica) Leon Bailey	Bayer Leverkusen	
January	(Portugal) André Silva	Eintracht Frankfurt	(United States) Matthew Hoppe	Schalke 04	(Germany) Nadiem Amiri	Bayer Leverkusen	
February	(England) Jadon Sancho	Borussia Dortmund	(Democratic Republic of the Congo) Silas	VfB Stuttgart	(Austria) Marcel Sabitzer	RB Leipzig	
March	(Serbia) Filip Kostić	Eintracht Frankfurt	(Japan) Ritsu Dōan	Arminia Bielefeld	(Netherlands) Deyovaisio Zeefuik	Hertha BSC	
April	(Norway) Erling Haaland	Borussia Dortmund	(Germany) Jamal Musiala	Bayern Munich	(Slovakia) Ondrej Duda	1. FC Köln	
May	—N/a		—N/a		(Poland) Robert Lewandowski	Bayern Munich	

=== Annual awards ===
Award	Winner	Club	Ref.
Player of the Season	(Norway) Erling Haaland	Borussia Dortmund	
Rookie of the Season	(Democratic Republic of the Congo) Silas	VfB Stuttgart	
Goal of the Season	(Austria) Valentino Lazaro	Borussia Mönchengladbach	

Team of the Season
Goalkeeper	(Germany) Manuel Neuer (Bayern Munich)			
Defenders	(Canada) Alphonso Davies (Bayern Munich)	(Spain) Angeliño (RB Leipzig)	(Germany) Mats Hummels (Borussia Dortmund)	(Germany) Ridle Baku (VfL Wolfsburg)
Midfielders	(Germany) Leon Goretzka (Bayern Munich)		(Germany) Joshua Kimmich (Bayern Munich)	(Germany) Thomas Müller (Bayern Munich)
Forwards	(Portugal) André Silva (Eintracht Frankfurt)		(Poland) Robert Lewandowski (Bayern Munich)	(Norway) Erling Haaland (Borussia Dortmund)
