= Matthew Hoppe =

American soccer player (born 2001)

Personal information
- Full name: Matthew Timothy Hoppe
- Date of birth: March 13, 2001 (age 25)
- Place of birth: Yorba Linda, California, United States
- Height: 6 ft 3 in (1.91 m)
- Position: Forward

Team information
- Current team: Sønderjyske
- Number: 9

Youth career
- 2014–2015: LA Galaxy
- 2015–2017: California United Strikers
- 2017–2019: Barça Residency Academy
- 2019–2020: Schalke 04

Senior career*
Years	Team	Apps	(Gls)
2020	Schalke 04 II	16	(1)
2020–2021	Schalke 04	23	(6)
2021–2022	Mallorca	5	(0)
2022–2025	Middlesbrough	6	(0)
2023	→ Hibernian (loan)	9	(1)
2023	→ San Jose Earthquakes (loan)	7	(2)
2025–	Sønderjyske	33	(6)

International career^{‡}
2021–2023	United States	8	(1)
Medal record
Representing United States
Winner	CONCACAF Gold Cup	2021
- * Club domestic league appearances and goals as of May 19, 2026 ‡ National team caps and goals as of January 28, 2023

Matthew Timothy Hoppe (born March 13, 2001) is an American professional soccer player who plays as a forward for Danish Superliga club Sønderjyske.

== Club career ==
=== Youth career and Schalke 04 ===
Hoppe played a single season with the LA Galaxy academy, before being released by the team. After playing for the Barça Residency Academy in Arizona, Hoppe signed with Schalke 04 in June 2019.

On November 28, 2020, he made his professional debut for Schalke against Borussia Mönchengladbach in the Bundesliga. On January 9, 2021, he scored a hat-trick, and his first senior goals for Schalke, in a league match against Hoffenheim. Hoppe became the first American to score a hat-trick in the Bundesliga and the 4–0 result also meant that the club ended their 30-game winless streak in the league.

Hoppe signed his first professional deal at Schalke on February 1, 2021, keeping him at the club until 2023.

=== Mallorca ===
Hoppe moved to La Liga club Mallorca on August 31, 2021, the last day of the 2021 summer transfer window. The transfer fee paid to Schalke 04 was reported as €3.5 million plus possible bonuses. Hoppe made only seven appearances for the club across all competitions in a debut season that was beset with injuries and a bout of COVID-19.

=== Middlesbrough ===
On August 10, 2022, Hoppe signed a four-year deal with EFL Championship side Middlesbrough. Hoppe was loaned to Scottish Premiership club Hibernian in January 2023. On August 3, 2023, Hoppe returned to the United States, signing on loan with Major League Soccer side San Jose Earthquakes until the end of the 2023 MLS season. San Jose Earthquakes had the option to purchase Hoppe through the loan agreement but chose not to exercise it. On 4 December 2023, Hoppe returned to his parent club but was unable to play until 2024 due to player registration rules.

On January 9, 2025, Hoppe had his Middlesbrough contract cancelled by mutual consent.

=== Sønderjyske ===
On January 31, 2025 it was confirmed that Hoppe joined Danish Superliga side Sønderjyske on a deal until June 2027. On January 29, 2026 Hoppe signed a new contract with Sønderjyske, so it now runs until 30 June 2028. At the same time, he changed his jersey number from 14 to 9.

== International career ==
Hoppe received his first call-up to the United States ahead of a friendly against Switzerland on May 20, 2021. He was named to the United States roster for the 2021 CONCACAF Gold Cup. Hoppe earned his first international cap when he was named in the starting 11 in the second group stage match of the competition against Martinique. On July 25, Hoppe scored his first national team goal against Jamaica in a 1–0 win for the United States in the quarter-finals of the tournament.

== Personal life ==
Hoppe is the son of Tom and Anna Hoppe. He is of German descent through his father's lineage. He has two older siblings; one brother and one sister. Hoppe is a Christian.

== Career statistics ==
=== Club ===
As of January 10, 2025

Appearances and goals by club, season and competition
Club	Season	League			National cup (Note: Includes DFB-Pokal, Copa del Rey)		Other		Total	
Club	Season	Division	Apps	Goals	Apps	Goals	Apps	Goals	Apps	Goals
Schalke 04 II	2020–21	Regionalliga West	16	1	—		—		16	1
Schalke 04	2020–21	Bundesliga	22	6	2	0	—		24	6
Schalke 04	2021–22	2. Bundesliga	1	0	0	0	—		1	0
Schalke 04	Total		23	6	2	0	—		25	6
Mallorca	2021–22	La Liga	5	0	2	0	—		7	0
Middlesbrough	2022–23	Championship	6	0	0	0	—		6	0
Middlesbrough	2023–24	Championship	0	0	0	0	—		0	0
Middlesbrough	2024–25	Championship	0	0	0	0	—		0	0
Middlesbrough	Total		6	0	0	0	—		6	0
Hibernian (loan)	2022–23	Scottish Premiership	9	1	—		—		9	1
San Jose Earthquakes (loan)	2023	Major League Soccer	7	2	—		1 (Note: Appearance in MLS Cup playoffs)	0	8	2
Career total			66	10	4	0	1	0	71	10

=== International ===
As of match played January 28, 2023

Appearances and goals by national team and year
National team	Year	Apps	Goals
United States	2021	6	1
United States	2022	0	0
United States	2023	2	0
Total		8	1

Scores and results list the United States' goal tally first, score column indicates score after each Hoppe's goal.

List of international goals scored by Matthew Hoppe
No.	Date	Venue	Cap	Opponent	Score	Result	Competition
1	July 25, 2021	AT&T Stadium, Arlington, United States	3	Jamaica	1–0	1–0	2021 CONCACAF Gold Cup

== Honors ==
United States

- CONCACAF Gold Cup: 2021

Individual

- Bundesliga Rookie of the Month: January 2021
