= Sead Kolašinac =

Bosnian footballer (born 1993)

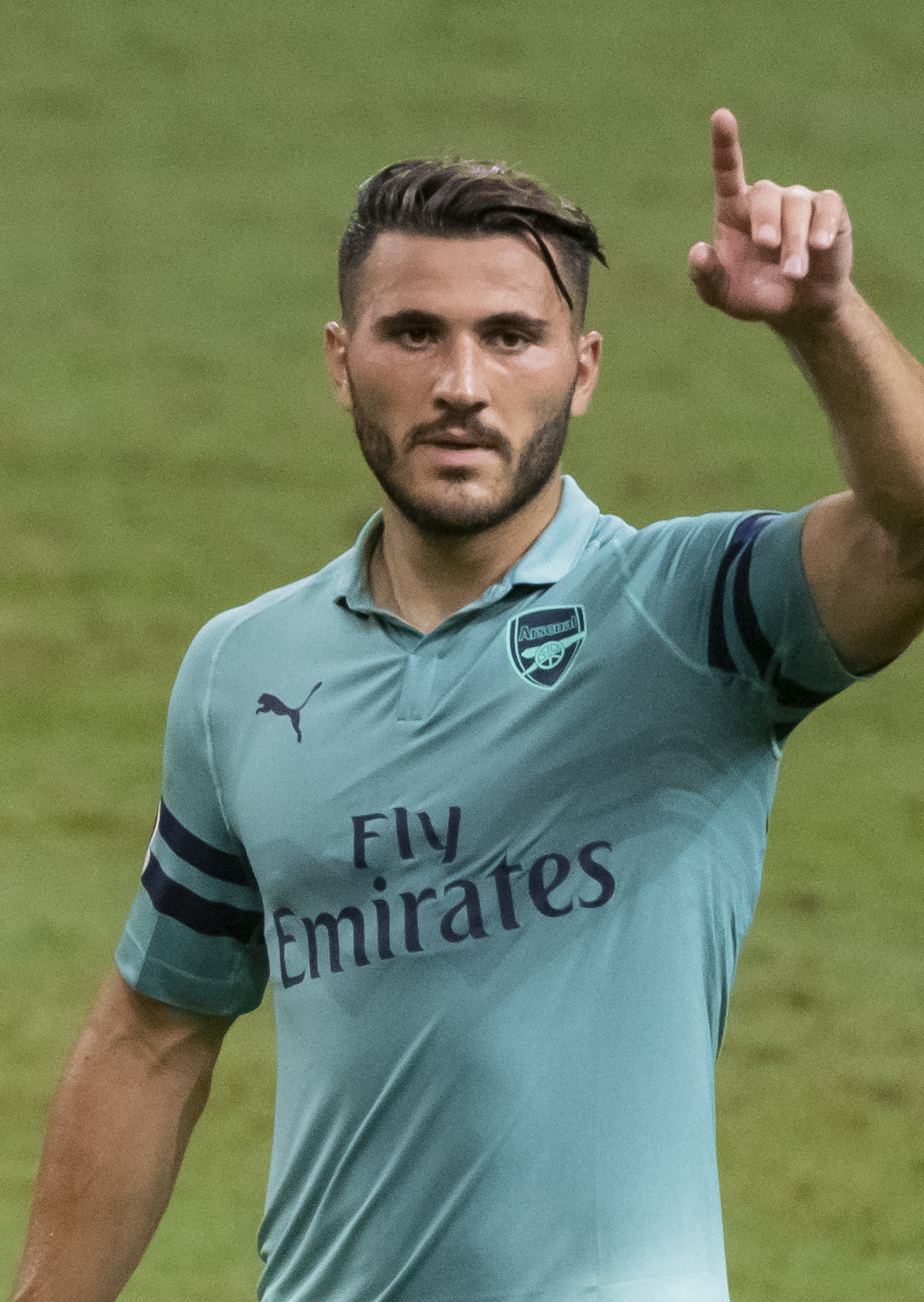
- Kolašinac with Arsenal in 2018

Personal information
- Date of birth: 20 June 1993 (age 33)
- Place of birth: Karlsruhe, Germany
- Height: 1.83 m (6 ft 0 in)
- Position: Centre-back

Team information
- Current team: Atalanta
- Number: 23

Youth career
- 2001–2009: Karlsruher SC
- 2009–2010: TSG Hoffenheim
- 2010: VfB Stuttgart
- 2011–2012: Schalke 04

Senior career*
Years	Team	Apps	(Gls)
2012–2015	Schalke 04 II	8	(2)
2012–2017	Schalke 04	94	(4)
2017–2022	Arsenal	80	(2)
2021	→ Schalke 04 (loan)	17	(1)
2022–2023	Marseille	47	(4)
2023–	Atalanta	79	(1)

International career^{‡}
2011	Germany U18	1	(0)
2011–2012	Germany U19	11	(1)
2012–2013	Germany U20	2	(1)
2013–	Bosnia and Herzegovina	74	(1)
- * Club domestic league appearances and goals as of 8 November 2026 ‡ National team caps and goals as of 14 November 2026

Sead Kolašinac (pronounced [sěad kolaʃîːnats]; born 20 June 1993) is a professional footballer who plays as a centre-back for Serie A club Atalanta. Born in Germany, he plays for the Bosnia and Herzegovina national team, for which he is the captain.

Kolašinac started his professional career at Schalke 04, playing first in its reserve team, before joining Arsenal in 2017, who loaned him back to Schalke 04 in 2021. The following year, he moved to Marseille. A year later, he signed with Atalanta.

A former German youth international, Kolašinac made his senior international debut for Bosnia and Herzegovina in 2013, earning over 70 caps since. He represented the nation at their first ever major championship, the 2014 FIFA World Cup and also at the 2026 FIFA World Cup.

== Club career ==
=== Schalke 04 ===
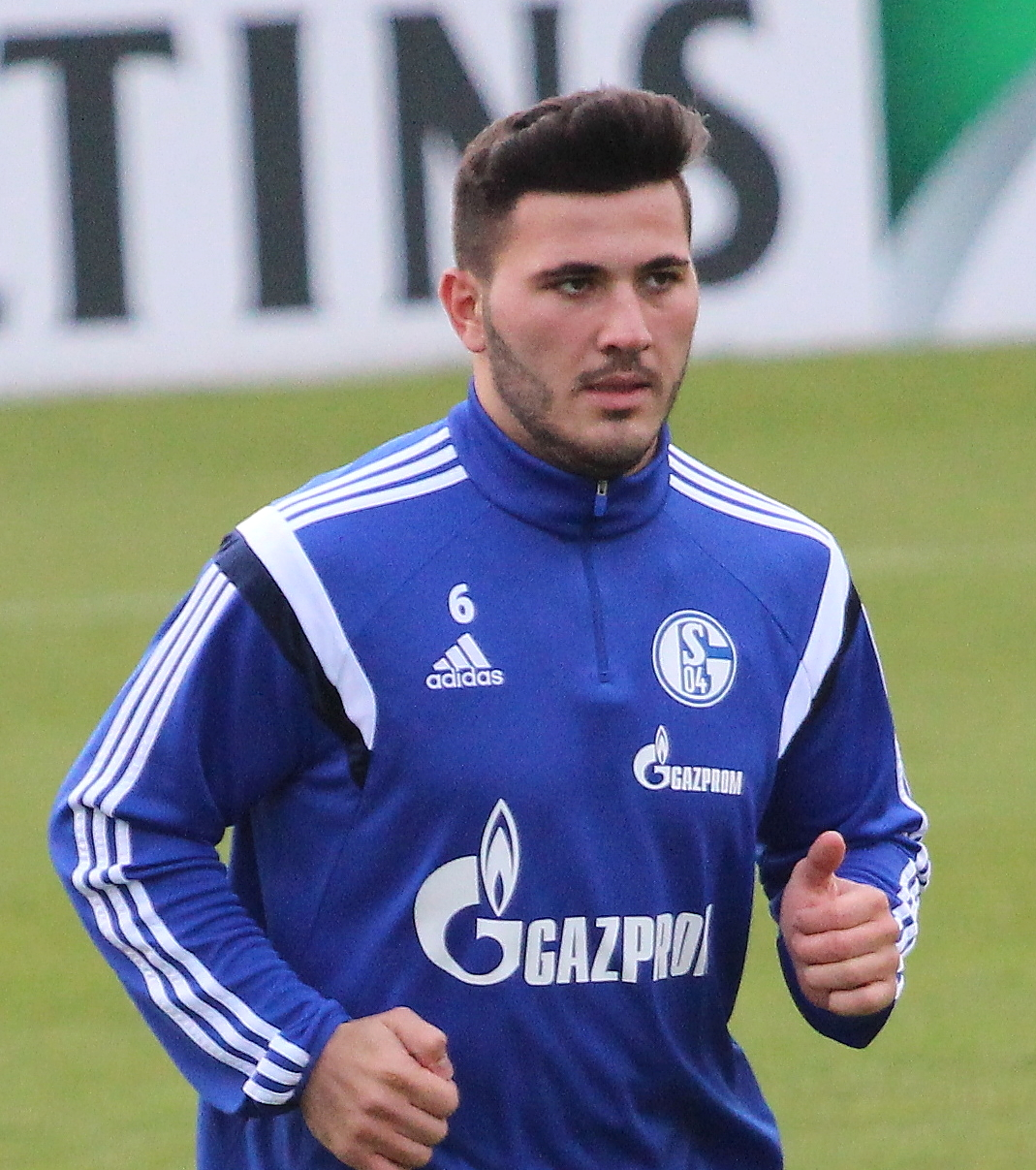
Kolašinac with Schalke 04 in 2015

Kolašinac started playing football at his hometown club Karlsruher SC, which he joined in 2001. In 2009, he moved to TSG Hoffenheim's youth academy. A year later, he switched to VfB Stuttgart's youth setup. In 2011, he went to Schalke 04's youth academy. In June 2012, he signed his first professional contract with the team. He made his professional debut against Greuther Fürth on 15 September at the age of 19.

Kolašinac debuted in the UEFA Champions League away at Montpellier on 4 December.

In June 2013, he extended his deal with the squad until June 2017.

In August 2014, he suffered a severe knee injury, which was diagnosed as an anterior cruciate ligament tear and was ruled out for at least six months. Over seven months after the injury, on 11 April 2015, he returned to the pitch.

On 13 December, he scored his first professional goal against FC Augsburg.

He played his 100th game for the club on 3 December 2016 against RB Leipzig, managed to score a goal and an own goal.

=== Arsenal ===
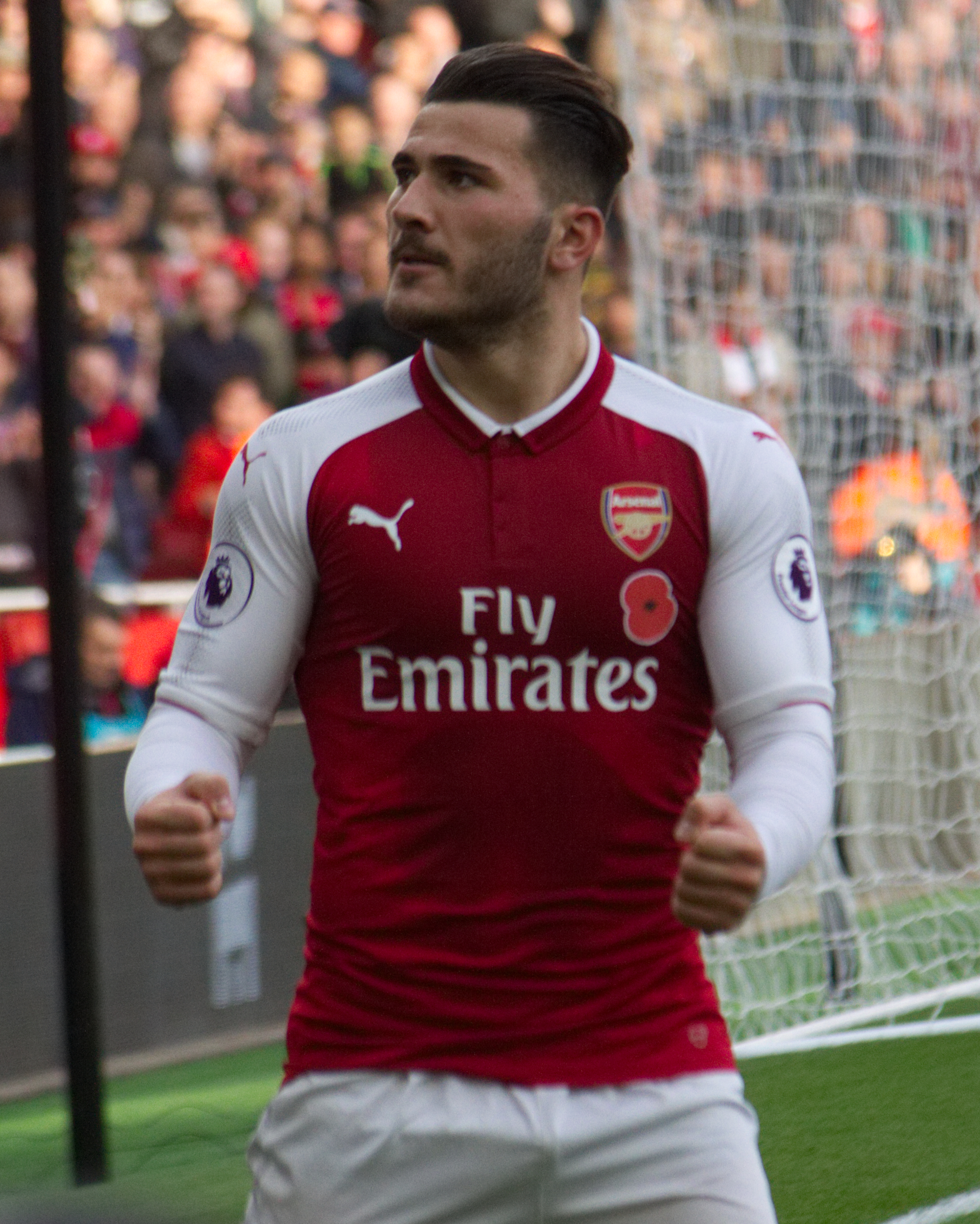
Kolašinac playing for Arsenal in 2017

In June 2017, Kolašinac signed a five-year contract with English side Arsenal.

==== 2017–18 season ====
He made his official debut for the club in the 2017 FA Community Shield match against Chelsea on 6 August, scored a goal and won his first trophy. A week later, he made his league debut against Leicester City.

In September 2017, he was voted Arsenal's Player of the Month for August.

On 28 October, he scored his first league goal for the squad in a triumph over Swansea City.

He was once again voted Arsenal's Player of the Month, this time for October.

==== 2018–19 season ====
In August 2018, Kolašinac picked up a knee injury during a pre-season clash against Chelsea, which ruled him out for the start of the season. He made his season debut in a UEFA Europa League tie against Qarabağ on 4 October.

==== 2019–20 season ====
Kolašinac played his first fixture of the campaign in a defeat of Burnley on 17 August 2019.

On 15 July 2020, he made his 100th appearance for the side against Liverpool.

He won his first major piece of silverware with Arsenal on 1 August, by beating Chelsea in the FA Cup final.

==== 2020–21 season ====
Kolašinac debuted in the season in the 2020 FA Community Shield tie against Liverpool on 29 August.

In January 2021, he was sent on a six-month loan to his former club Schalke 04 and became its captain. He played his first competitive game for the team since coming back on 9 January against TSG Hoffenheim. On 27 February, he scored first goal for Schalke 04 since his comeback in a loss to VfB Stuttgart.

==== 2021–22 season ====
Kolašinac appeared in his first match of the season in an EFL Cup fixture against West Bromwich Albion on 25 August.

In November, he suffered an ankle injury, which was diagnosed as a broken ankle and was expected to be sidelined for at least two months.

=== Marseille ===
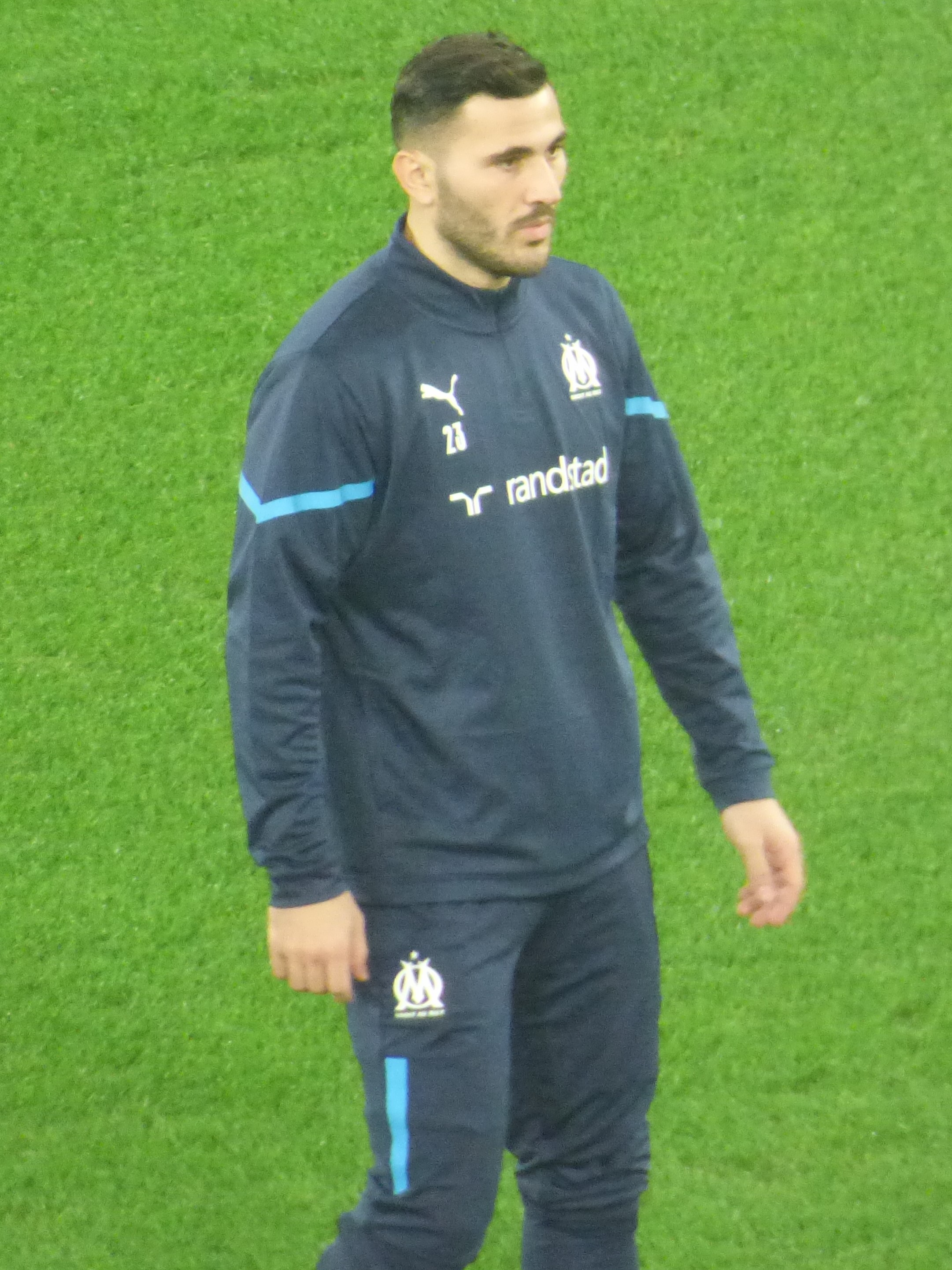
Kolašinac with Marseille in 2022

In January 2022, Kolašinac moved to French outfit Marseille on a deal until June 2023. He debuted officially for the squad on 4 February against Angers. On 13 November, he scored his first goal for Marseille against Monaco, which secured the victory for his team.

=== Atalanta ===
In July 2023, Kolašinac joined Italian side Atalanta on a three-year contract. He debuted competitively for the outfit against Sassuolo on 20 August. On 8 October, he scored his first goal for Atalanta against Lazio. He won his first title with the club on 22 May 2024, by beating Bayer Leverkusen in the UEFA Europa League final.

Kolašinac scored his first UEFA Champions League goal on 26 November against Young Boys.

In April 2025, he suffered a ruptured anterior cruciate ligament again and was predicted to miss at least half a year. He made his return to action over seven months after the injury, on 26 November.

He appeared in his 100th match for the team on 11 April 2026 against Juventus.

In May, he penned a new one-year contract with Atalanta.

== International career ==
Despite representing Germany at various youth levels, Kolašinac decided to play for Bosnia and Herzegovina at the senior level.

In November 2013, his request to change sports citizenship from German to Bosnian was approved by FIFA. Later that month, he received his first senior call up, for a friendly game against Argentina, and debuted in that match on 18 November.

In June 2014, Kolašinac was named in Bosnia and Herzegovina's squad for the 2014 FIFA World Cup, country's first ever major competition. He made his tournament debut in the opening group tie against Argentina on 15 June.

In June 2026, Kolašinac was selected for Bosnia and Herzegovina's team for the 2026 FIFA World Cup. He debuted in the contest during the opening group fixture against Canada on 12 June.

On 14 November, in a 2026–27 UEFA Nations League B fixture against Sweden, Kolašinac scored his first senior international goal.

== Style of play ==
During his career, Kolašinac has been deployed as a centre-back and as a defensive midfielder, although he spent most of the time playing as a left-back. He possesses very strong body build and strength.

== Personal life ==
Kolašinac married his long-time girlfriend Susubelle in June 2019. Together they have a daughter named Soleil.

He is a practising Muslim; together with international teammates Ibrahim Šehić, Muhamed Bešić, Armin Hodžić, Izet Hajrović, Edin Višća and Ervin Zukanović he visited a mosque in Zenica during the national team's concentration.

In July 2019, he and his then teammate Mesut Özil were victims of an attempted carjacking, which Kolašinac successfully fought off.

== Career statistics ==
=== Club ===
As of match played 8 November 2026

Appearances and goals by club, season and competition
Club	Season	League			National cup (Note: Includes DFB-Pokal, FA Cup, Coupe de France, Coppa Italia)		League cup (Note: Includes EFL Cup)		Continental		Other		Total	
Club	Season	Division	Apps	Goals	Apps	Goals	Apps	Goals	Apps	Goals	Apps	Goals	Apps	Goals
Schalke 04 II	2011–12	Regionalliga West	2	0	–		–		–		–		2	0
Schalke 04 II	2012–13	Regionalliga West	5	2	–		–		–		–		5	2
Schalke 04 II	2014–15	Regionalliga West	1	0	–		–		–		–		1	0
Schalke 04 II	Total		8	2	–		–		–		–		8	2
Schalke 04	2012–13	Bundesliga	16	0	1	0	–		3 (Note: Appearances in UEFA Champions League)	0	–		20	0
Schalke 04	2013–14	Bundesliga	24	0	0	0	–		6	0	–		30	0
Schalke 04	2014–15	Bundesliga	6	0	1	0	–		0	0	–		7	0
Schalke 04	2015–16	Bundesliga	23	1	1	0	–		6 (Note: Appearance(s) in UEFA Europa League)	0	–		30	1
Schalke 04	2016–17	Bundesliga	25	3	3	0	–		8	0	–		35	3
Schalke 04	Total		94	4	6	0	–		23	0	–		123	4
Arsenal	2017–18	Premier League	27	2	0	0	3	0	5	2	1 (Note: Appearance in FA Community Shield)	1	36	5
Arsenal	2018–19	Premier League	24	0	2	0	0	0	10	0	–		36	0
Arsenal	2019–20	Premier League	26	0	4	0	1	0	1	0	–		32	0
Arsenal	2020–21	Premier League	1	0	0	0	3	0	4	0	1	0	9	0
Arsenal	2021–22	Premier League	2	0	1	0	2	0	–		–		5	0
Arsenal	Total		80	2	7	0	9	0	20	2	2	1	118	5
Schalke 04 (loan)	2020–21	Bundesliga	17	1	1	0	–		–		–		18	1
Marseille	2021–22	Ligue 1	14	0	0	0	–		3 (Note: Appearances in UEFA Conference League)	0	–		17	0
Marseille	2022–23	Ligue 1	33	4	4	0	–		4	0	–		41	4
Marseille	Total		47	4	4	0	–		7	0	–		58	4
Atalanta	2023–24	Serie A	30	1	4	0	–		9	0	–		43	1
Atalanta	2024–25	Serie A	23	0	0	0	–		9	1	2 (Note: One appearance in UEFA Super Cup; one appearance in Supercoppa Italiana)	0	34	1
Atalanta	2025–26	Serie A	19	0	3	0	–		6	0	–		28	0
Atalanta	2026–27	Serie A	7	0	0	0	–		2	0	–		9	0
Atalanta	Total		79	1	7	0	–		26	1	2	0	114	2
Career total			325	14	25	0	9	0	76	3	4	1	439	18

=== International ===
As of match played 14 November 2026

Appearances and goals by national team and year
National team	Year	Apps	Goals
Bosnia and Herzegovina
Bosnia and Herzegovina	2013	1	0
Bosnia and Herzegovina	2014	5	0
Bosnia and Herzegovina	2015	4	0
Bosnia and Herzegovina	2016	7	0
Bosnia and Herzegovina	2017	5	0
Bosnia and Herzegovina	2018	2	0
Bosnia and Herzegovina	2019	6	0
Bosnia and Herzegovina	2020	5	0
Bosnia and Herzegovina	2021	8	0
Bosnia and Herzegovina	2022	8	0
Bosnia and Herzegovina	2023	6	0
Bosnia and Herzegovina	2024	3	0
Bosnia and Herzegovina	2025	2	0
Bosnia and Herzegovina	2026	12	1
Total		74	1

Scores and results list Bosnia and Herzegovina's goal tally first, score column indicates score after each Kolašinac goal.

List of international goals scored by Sead Kolašinac
No.	Date	Venue	Cap	Opponent	Score	Result	Competition
1	14 November 2026	Nationalarenan, Solna, Sweden	74	Sweden	2–3	2–3	2026–27 UEFA Nations League B

== Honours ==
Arsenal

- FA Cup: 2019–20
- FA Community Shield: 2017, 2020

Atalanta

- UEFA Europa League: 2023–24

Individual

- Bundesliga Team of the Season: 2016–17
- UEFA Europa League Squad of the Season: 2018–19
