= Dimitrios Grammozis =

Greek football player and manager

Personal information
- Date of birth: 8 July 1978 (age 48)
- Place of birth: Wuppertal, West Germany
- Height: 1.79 m (5 ft 10 in)
- Position: Defensive midfielder

Youth career
- 1984–1988: TuS Neviges
- 1988–1991: SSVg Velbert
- 1991–1992: Borussia Velbert
- 1993: Wuppertaler SV
- 1994–1996: KFC Uerdingen

Senior career*
Years	Team	Apps	(Gls)
1996–1998	KFC Uerdingen	57	(3)
1998–2000	Hamburger SV	32	(1)
2000–2005	1. FC Kaiserslautern	92	(3)
2002–2003	→ 1. FC Kaiserslautern II	2	(0)
2005–2006	1. FC Köln	19	(0)
2006–2007	Rot-Weiss Essen	8	(0)
2007–2008	Ergotelis	31	(3)
2009–2011	Omonia Nicosia	32	(1)
2011–2012	Kerkyra	34	(5)
2012–2013	VfL Bochum II	26	(1)
Total		333	(17)

International career
	Greece U21	8	(0)

Managerial career
- 2015: VfL Bochum II
- 2019–2020: Darmstadt 98
- 2021–2022: Schalke 04
- 2023–2024: 1. FC Kaiserslautern
- * Club domestic league appearances and goals

Dimitrios Grammozis (Greek: Δημήτριος Γραμμόζης; born 8 July 1978) is a professional football manager and former player, who last managed 1. FC Kaiserslautern. During his playing years, he was known as a versatile defender and defensive midfielder. Born in Germany, he was a youth international for Greece.

== Playing career ==
=== Early years ===
Grammozis was born in Wuppertal and grew up in Velbert. He began his football career in 1984 with local side TuS Neviges in the Velbert neighborhood district. After four years, in 1988, Grammozis moved to SSVg Velbert, where he played for three years. His next and final stop in Velbert was a two-year stint at Borussia Velbert. In 1992, Grammozis returned to his hometown. After a year in the youth teams of Wuppertaler SV, he moved in 1994 to KFC Uerdingen, where he played two more years in the A-youth. In 1996, aged 18, Grammozis played his first senior season in the 2. Bundesliga with KFC Uerdingen. In 1998, after another season in the 2. Bundesliga, he was transferred to Bundesliga side Hamburger SV for €350,000.

=== Senior career ===
Grammozis spent two years with Hamburger SV, contributing to a third-place 1999–2000 Bundesliga finish and subsequent qualification to the Champions League. However, he did not manage to permanently assert himself as a regular, and in addition to the arrival of quality players, Grammozis moved to Kaiserslautern in 2000. He spent five years with The Red Devils, characterized by injury problems and difficulties with his coaches, especially in his last two seasons.

At the start of the season 2005–06 season, Grammozis moved to newly promoted side 1. FC Köln on a two-year deal. However, after the end of the season, the club prematurely terminated Grammozis' contract. As a result, on 20 July 2006 he moved on a free transfer to 2. Bundesliga newly promoted side Rot-Weiss Essen, signing a contract until 30 June 2008.

In June 2007 Grammozis left Germany and moved to Super League Greece side Ergotelis, signing a one-year contract with an option for another year. After a successful 2007–08 season with Ergotelis in which he played in 23 games and scored once, the club opted to extend his contract. However, after falling out with coach Nikos Karageorgiou in November 2008, Grammozis was transferred out to Cypriot First Division side Omonia Nicosia in December for a reported €150,000. He spent 2.5 years at Omonia, where he became Cypriot champion in 2010, and won the Cypriot Super Cup against Apollon Limassol.

In January 2011, Grammozis returned to the Super League Greece and joined newly promoted side Kerkyra. In the summer of 2012, he moved to VfL Bochum II, signing for two years, but ended up retiring his career at the end of the 2012–13 Regionalliga, having played in 26 games.

== Coaching career ==
On 25 January 2014, Grammozis was hired as assistant to head coach Thomas Reis for VfL Bochum II. At the start of the 2014–15 season, he took over the U-15 juniors of VfL Bochum in the Regionalliga West, his first youth team as coach.

In March 2018, Grammozis successfully received his coaching license by the German Football Association.

On 24 February 2019, he was appointed as the head coach of Darmstadt 98 until the end of the 2019–20 season.

On 2 March 2021, he was appointed as the fifth head coach of Schalke 04 during the 2020–21 Bundesliga season. He received a contract until 2022. On 6 March 2022, he was relieved from his duties.

On 3 December 2023, he was appointed as the head coach of 1. FC Kaiserslautern. He was sacked in February 2024.

== Personal life ==
Grammozis parents hail from Kefalovryso, Ioannina.

== Career statistics ==
=== Club ===
Appearances and goals by club, season and competition
Club	Season	League			National Cup		Europe		Other		Total	
Club	Season	Division	Apps	Goals	Apps	Goals	Apps	Goals	Apps	Goals	Apps	Goals
KFC Uerdingen	1996–97	2. Bundesliga	33	2	1	0	—		—		34	2
KFC Uerdingen	1997–98	2. Bundesliga	24	1	1	0	—		—		25	1
KFC Uerdingen	Total		57	3	2	0	0	0	0	0	59	3
Hamburger SV	1998–99	Bundesliga	15	0	2	0	—		—		17	0
Hamburger SV	1999–00	Bundesliga	17	1	1	0	5	0	—		23	1
Hamburger SV	Total		32	1	3	0	5	0	0	0	40	1
1. FC Kaiserslautern	2000–01	Bundesliga	23	0	2	0	10	0	2 (Note: Appearances in DFB-Ligapokal)	0	37	0
1. FC Kaiserslautern	2001–02	Bundesliga	17	1	3	0	—		—		20	1
1. FC Kaiserslautern	2002–03	Bundesliga	27	0	4	1	0	0	—		31	1
1. FC Kaiserslautern	2003–04	Bundesliga	12	1	0	0	2	0	—		14	1
1. FC Kaiserslautern	2004–05	Bundesliga	13	1	2	0	—		—		15	1
1. FC Kaiserslautern	Total		92	3	11	1	12	0	2	0	117	4
1. FC Kaiserslautern II	2002–03	Regionalliga Süd	2	0	—		—		—		2	0
1. FC Köln	2005–06	Bundesliga	19	0	1	0	—		—		20	0
Rot-Weiss Essen	2006–07	2. Bundesliga	8	0	0	0	—		—		8	0
Ergotelis	2007–08	Super League Greece	23	1	1	0	—		—		24	1
Ergotelis	2008–09	Super League Greece	8	2	1	0	—		—		9	2
Ergotelis	Total		31	3	2	0	0	0	0	0	33	3
Omonia Nicosia	2008–09	First Division	14	1			0	0	—		14	1
Omonia Nicosia	2009–10	First Division	15	0	0	0	2	0	—		17	0
Omonia Nicosia	2010–11	First Division	3	0	0	0	1	0	—		4	0
Omonia Nicosia	Total		32	1	0	0	3	0	0	0	35	1
Kerkyra	2010–11	Super League Greece	9	1	1	0	—		—		10	1
Kerkyra	2011–12	Super League Greece	25	4	3	0	—		—		28	4
Kerkyra	Total		34	5	4	0	0	0	0	0	38	5
VfL Bochum II	2012–13	Regionalliga West	26	1	—		—		—		26	1
Career total			333	17	23	1	20	0	2	0	378	18

=== Managerial ===
As of 10 February 2024

Managerial record by team and tenure
Team	From	To	Record							
Team	From	To	G	W	D	L	GF	GA	GD	Win %
VfL Bochum II	6 January 2015	23 May 2015	16	4	2	10	20	25	−5	25.00
Darmstadt 98	24 February 2019	29 June 2020	47	20	15	12	68	58	+10	42.55
Schalke 04	2 March 2021	6 March 2022	38	15	6	17	62	59	+3	39.47
1. FC Kaiserslautern	3 December 2023	13 February 2024	8	3	0	5	13	12	+1	37.50
Total			109	42	23	44	163	154	+9	38.53
