= Mikail Maden =

Norwegian footballer (born 2002)

Personal information
- Full name: Mikail Maden
- Date of birth: 17 January 2002 (age 24)
- Place of birth: Bergen, Norway
- Height: 1.82 m (6 ft 0 in)
- Position: Midfielder

Team information
- Current team: Esbjerg fB
- Number: 8

Youth career
- –2019: Brann
- 2020–2021: Schalke 04

Senior career*
Years	Team	Apps	(Gls)
2018–2019	Brann 2	15	(2)
2021	Schalke 04	1	(0)
2021–2022	Schalke 04 II	22	(0)
2022–2023	Fredrikstad	8	(0)
2024–	Esbjerg fB	74	(9)

International career^{‡}
2017	Norway U15	2	(0)
2018	Norway U16	11	(0)
2018–2019	Norway U17	9	(0)
2019	Norway U18	3	(0)
2021	Norway U20	2	(0)
- * Club domestic league appearances and goals as of 2 June 2026 ‡ National team caps and goals as of 24 June 2022

Mikail Maden (born 17 January 2002) is a Norwegian footballer who plays as a midfielder for Danish 1st Division side Esbjerg fB.

== Career ==
Maden made his professional debut for Schalke 04 in the Bundesliga on 13 March 2021, coming on as a substitute in the 85th minute for Amine Harit against VfL Wolfsburg. The away match finished as a 0–5 loss.

At the end of February 2024, Maden joined Danish 2nd Division side Esbjerg fB on a deal until the end of the season. After 3 goals and 3 assists in 16 games, and promotion to the 2024-25 Danish 1st Division, Maden signed a new two-year contract with Esbjerg in June 2024.
