= Jeff-Denis Fehr =

German footballer

Personal information
- Date of birth: 8 September 1994 (age 32)
- Place of birth: Stolberg, Germany
- Height: 1.76 m (5 ft 9 in)
- Position: Midfielder

Team information
- Current team: Wuppertaler SV
- Number: 19

Youth career
- –2011: Alemannia Aachen
- 2011–2013: SV Rott

Senior career*
Years	Team	Apps	(Gls)
2013–2016	Schwarz-Weiß Rehden	58	(5)
2016–2018	Hansa Rostock	13	(0)
2018–2019	Sonnenhof Großaspach	14	(1)
2020	Alemannia Aachen	0	(0)
2020–2022	Wegberg-Beeck	66	(5)
2022–2024	SV Rödinghausen	49	(8)
2024–2025	KFC Uerdingen	24	(7)
2025–	Wuppertaler SV	22	(2)
- * Club domestic league appearances and goals as of 24 June 2026

Jeff-Denis Fehr (born 8 September 1994) is a German footballer who plays as a midfielder for Wuppertaler SV.
