= 2026–27 1. FC Union Berlin season =

1. FC Union Berlin
2026–27 season
- President: Dirk Zingler
- Head coach: Mauro Lustrinelli
- Stadium: Stadion An der Alten Försterei
Home colours	Away colours	Third colours
- All statistics correct as of 16 May 2026.

The 2026–27 season is the 121st season in the history of 1. FC Union Berlin, and the club's eighth consecutive season in the Bundesliga. In addition to the domestic league, the club participated in the DFB-Pokal.

== Season summary ==
On 13 May 2026, the club's pre-season friendlies were announced.

On 21 May 2026, Mauro Lustrinelli was announced as the head coach of the club.

== Coaching staff ==
Position	Staff
Head coach	(Switzerland) Mauro Lustrinelli
Assistant coach	(Germany) Sebastian Bönig
Goalkeeper coach	(Austria) Michael Gspurning
Athletic coach	(Germany) Martin Krüger
Rehab coach	(Germany) Johannes Thienel
Game Analysis	(Austria) Tobias Drössler
Assistant Coach/Match Analyst	(Germany) Adrian Wittmann

== Players ==
=== First team ===
As of 1 September 2026

Note: Flags indicate national team as defined under FIFA eligibility rules; some limited exceptions apply. Players may hold more than one non-FIFA nationality.

No.	Pos.	Nation	Player
1	GK	DEN	Frederik Rønnow
2	DF	GER	Felix Uduokhai
3	DF	GER	Andrik Markgraf
4	DF	BEL	Zeno Van Den Bosch
5	DF	GER	Marvin Friedrich
6	MF	GER	Aljoscha Kemlein
7	FW	SCO	Oliver Burke
8	MF	TUN	Rani Khedira (vice-captain)
9	FW	TUR	Livan Burcu
11	MF	KOR	Jeong Woo-yeong
13	MF	HUN	András Schäfer
14	DF	AUT	Leopold Querfeld
15	DF	GER	Tom Rothe
17	DF	GHA	Derrick Köhn
18	DF	CRO	Josip Juranović

No.	Pos.	Nation	Player
19	MF	GER	Janik Haberer
20	MF	SUI	Michel Aebischer
21	MF	GER	Tim Skarke
23	FW	SRB	Andrej Ilić
24	MF	DEN	Robert Skov
25	GK	GER	Carl Klaus
27	FW	CRO	Marin Ljubičić
28	DF	AUT	Christopher Trimmel (captain)
29	FW	CIV	Emmanuel Latte Lath (on loan from Atlanta United)
30	MF	SUI	Kastriot Imeri
31	GK	GER	Matheo Raab
32	FW	JAM	Mekhi Gray
34	DF	FRA	Stanley Nsoki
38	FW	GER	Julien Friedrich
49	MF	GER	Linus Güther

== Transfers ==
=== In ===
Date	Pos.	Player	From	Fee	Ref.
10 June 2026	DF	(Germany) Marvin Friedrich	(Germany) Borussia Mönchengladbach	Free	
15 June 2026	DF	(Belgium) Zeno Van Den Bosch	(Belgium) Royal Antwerp FC	Free	
1 July 2026	DF	(France) Stanley Nsoki	(Germany) TSG Hoffenheim	€1,500,000	
2 August 2026	FW	(Ivory Coast) Emmanuel Latte Lath	(United States) Atlanta United	Loan	

=== Out ===
Date	Pos.	Player	To	Fee	Ref.
14 May 2026	DF	(Portugal) Diogo Leite		Released	
27 May 2026	GK	(Germany) Yannic Stein	(Germany) Hansa Rostock	Undisclosed	
14 July 2026	DF	(Netherlands) Danilho Doekhi	(Italy) Lazio	Released	
16 July 2026	MF	(Czech Republic) Alex Král	(Denmark) Copenhagen	Released	

== Pre-season and friendlies ==
Win Draw Loss Fixtures

4 July 2026 Friendly	Optik Rathenow	2–12	Union Berlin	Rathenow
15:30 CEST	Langner 22'; Sannoh 44'		Ilić 15', 34'; Köhn 24'; Burcu 33'; Burke 36'; Schäfer 39'; Ansah 42'; Rothe 49'; Güther 56', 76'; Ljubičić 72', 78'	Stadium: Stadion Vogelgesang

== Competitions ==
=== Bundesliga ===
==== League table ====
Pos	Team	Pld	W	D	L	GF	GA	GD	Pts	Qualification or relegation
14	SC Paderborn	10	2	4	4	8	15	−7	10	
15	FC Augsburg	9	2	3	4	20	20	0	9	
16	Union Berlin	10	1	4	5	8	26	−18	7	Qualification for the relegation play-offs
17	Schalke 04	9	1	3	5	5	11	−6	6	Relegation to 2. Bundesliga
18	Borussia Mönchengladbach	10	1	1	8	12	26	−14	4	Relegation to 2. Bundesliga

Updated to match(es) played on 21 November 2026. Source: Bundesliga
Rules for classification: 1) Points; 2) Goal difference; 3) Goals scored; 4) Head-to-head aggregate results; 5) Head-to-head away goals scored; 6) Away goals scored; 7) Play-off at neutral site.
(Rules 4–6 only apply after all home-and-away matches have been played between the tied teams. Rule 7 only applies after the completion of the season.)

==== Results summary ====
Overall								Home						Away					
Pld	W	D	L	GF	GA	GD	Pts	W	D	L	GF	GA	GD	W	D	L	GF	GA	GD
10	1	4	5	8	26	−18	7	1	3	2	7	12	−5	0	1	3	1	14	−13

Last updated: 21 November 2026.
Source: Bundesliga

==== Results by round ====
Round	1	2	3	4	5	6	7	8	9	10	11	12	13	14	15	16	17	18	19	20	21	22	23	24	25	26	27	28	29	30	31	32	33	34
Ground	H	A	H	A	H	H	A	H	A	H	A	H	A	H	A	H	A	A	H	A	H	A	A	H	A	H	A	H	A	H	A	H	A	H
Result	D	L	L	L	W	D	D	D	L	L																								
Position	8	15																																

Updated to match(es) played on 21 November 2026. Source: DFB
A = Away; H = Home; W = Win; D = Draw; L = Loss

==== Matches ====
The league fixtures was released on 2 July 2026.

29 August 2026 1	Union Berlin	3–3	Eintracht Frankfurt	Berlin
15:30 CEST (UTC+2)	Lath 3'; Aebischer (yellow card) 23'; Querfeld 79'; Van Den Bosch (yellow card) 81'; Skarke 90+2'	Report	Ebnoutalib 10', 11', 67', (yellow card) 11'; Maluze (yellow card) 13'; Onyedika (yellow card) 84'; Otávio (yellow card) 90'	Stadium: Stadion An der Alten Försterei; Attendance: 22,012; Referee: Bastian Dankert

5 September 2026 2	Bayer Leverkusen	4–0	Union Berlin	Leverkusen
15:30 CEST	Fernández 1'; Medina 28'; Schick 48'; Gutiérrez (yellow card) 61'; Maza 66', (yellow card) 88'	Report	Uduokhai (yellow card) 4'; Van Den Bosch (yellow card) 47'	Stadium: BayArena; Attendance: 29,629; Referee: Robin Braun

11 September 2026 3	Union Berlin	1–3	Schalke 04	Berlin
20:30 CEST	Kemlein (yellow card) 45'; Ljubičić (yellow card) 74'; Uduokhai (yellow card) 78'; Skarke 90+6'	Report	Gosens 25'; Aouchiche 46'; Karius (yellow card) 90+9'; Wöber 90+13'	Stadium: Stadion An der Alten Försterei; Referee: Timo Gerach

18 September 2026 4	Bayern Munich	7–0	Union Berlin	Munich
20:30 CEST	Musiala 18'; Kane 39' (pen.), 54'; Olise 43', 73', 76'; Upamecano (yellow card) 45+2'; Saibari 70'	Report	Uduokhai (yellow card) 38'; Khedira (yellow card) 42'; Burcu (yellow card) 78'	Stadium: Allianz Arena; Referee: Benjamin Brand

10 October 2026 5	Union Berlin	1–0	SV Elversberg	Berlin
15:30 CEST	Haberer (yellow card) 7'; Skarke (yellow card) 21'; Burcu 81'	Report	Krattenmacher (yellow card) 90+2'	Stadium: Stadion An der Alten Försterei; Referee: Tobias Reichel

17 October 2026 6	Union Berlin	0–0	Borussia Dortmund	Berlin
15:30 CEST (UTC+2)	Haberer (yellow card) 33'; Rothe (yellow card) 35'; Skarke (yellow card) 63'	Report	Nwaneri (yellow card) 1'; Anton (yellow card) 7'; Guirassy (yellow card) 14'	Stadium: Stadion An der Alten Försterei; Attendance: 22,012; Referee: Daniel Schlager

24 October 2026 7	FC Augsburg	1–1	Union Berlin	Augsburg
15:30 CEST	Bah (red card) 63'; Massengo 71'	Report	Uduokhai (red card) 19'; Haberer (yellow card) 31', (goal) 74'; Querfeld (yellow card) 36'; Gray (yellow card) 77'	Stadium: WWK Arena; Attendance: 30,051; Referee: Robin Braun

1 November 2026 8	Union Berlin	1–1	1. FC Köln	Berlin
14:30 CET	Haberer 10'; Van Den Bosch (yellow card) 37'; Imeri (yellow card) 54'; Kemlein (yellow card) 76'; Köhn (yellow card) 77'	Report	Simpson-Pusey (yellow card) 45+1'; Okon-Engstler (yellow card) 53'; Maina (yellow card) 69'; El Mala 79'	Stadium: Stadion An der Alten Försterei; Attendance: 22,012; Referee: Richard Hempel

8 November 2026 9	SC Freiburg	2–0	Union Berlin	Freiburg
17:30 CET (UTC+1)	Matanović (yellow card) 2'; Engelhardt (yellow card) 27'; Suzuki 55'; Khedira 67'	Report	Van Den Bosch (yellow card) 20'; Jeong (yellow card) 89'	Stadium: Europa-Park Stadion; Attendance: 33,400; Referee: Sascha Stegemann

21 November 2026 10	Union Berlin	1–5	RB Leipzig	Berlin
15:30 CET (UTC+1)	Schäfer (yellow card) 9'; Van Den Bosch (yellow card) 17'; Aebischer 41'	Report	Gruda (yellow card) 5', (goal) 72'; Banzuzi (yellow card) 13'; Nusa 18' (pen.); Rômulo 50'; Reitz 76'; Baku 89'	Stadium: Stadion An der Alten Försterei; Attendance: 22,012; Referee: Christian Dingert

28 November 2026 11	Mainz 05	v	Union Berlin
		Report

4 December - 6 December 2026 12	Union Berlin	v	Hamburger SV
		Report

11 December – 13 December 2026 13	VfB Stuttgart	v	Union Berlin
		Report

18 December – 20 December 2026 14	Union Berlin	v	TSG Hoffenheim
		Report

8 January 2027 – 10 January 2027 15	Werder Bremen	v	Union Berlin
		Report

12 January – 14 January 2027 16	Union Berlin	v	SC Paderborn 07
		Report

15 January – 17 January 2027 17	Borussia Mönchengladbach	v	Union Berlin
		Report

22 January – 24 January 2027 18	Eintracht Frankfurt	v	Union Berlin
		Report

29 January – 31 January 2027 19	Union Berlin	v	Bayer Leverkusen
		Report

5 February – 7 February 2027 20	Schalke	v	Union Berlin
		Report

12 February – 14 February 2027 21	Union Berlin	v	Bayern Munich
		Report

19 February – 21 February 2027 22	SV Elversberg	v	Union Berlin
		Report

26 February – 28 February 2027 23	Borussia Dortmund	v	Union Berlin
		Report

2 March – 4 March 2027 24	Union Berlin	v	FC Augsburg
		Report

5 March – 7 March 2027 25	1. FC Köln	v	Union Berlin
		Report

12 March – 14 March 2027 26	Union Berlin	v	SC Freiburg
		Report

19 March – 21 March 2027 27	RB Leipzig	v	Union Berlin
		Report

2 April – 4 April 2027 28	Union Berlin	v	Mainz 05
		Report

9 April – 11 April 2027 29	Hamburger SV	v	Union Berlin
		Report

16 April – 18 April 2027 30	Union Berlin	v	VfB Stuttgart
		Report

23 April – 25 April 2027 31	TSG Hoffenheim	v	Union Berlin
		Report

7 May – 9 May 2027 32	Union Berlin	v	Werder Bremen
		Report

14 May – 16 May 2027 33	SC Paderborn 07	v	Union Berlin
		Report

22 May 2027 34	Union Berlin	v	Borussia Mönchengladbach
		Report

=== DFB-Pokal ===
23 August 2026 First round	Eintracht Braunschweig	2–4	Union Berlin	Braunschweig
15:30	Marie 11', 54'	Report	Van Den Bosch 31'; Rothe 63'; Ljubičić 72', 90+4'	Stadium: Eintracht-Stadion; Attendance: 21,532; Referee: Sören Storks

27 October 2026 Second round	1. FC Köln	5–0	Union Berlin	Cologne
20:45	El Mala 32', 60'; Maina 51'; Jóhannesson 78'; Sebulonsen (yellow card) 84', (goal) 88'	Report	Querfeld (yellow card) 48'; Ljubičić (yellow card) 77'; Burcu (yellow card) 90'	Stadium: RheinEnergieStadion; Attendance: 49,000; Referee: Sven Jablonski
