= Linus Güther =

German footballer

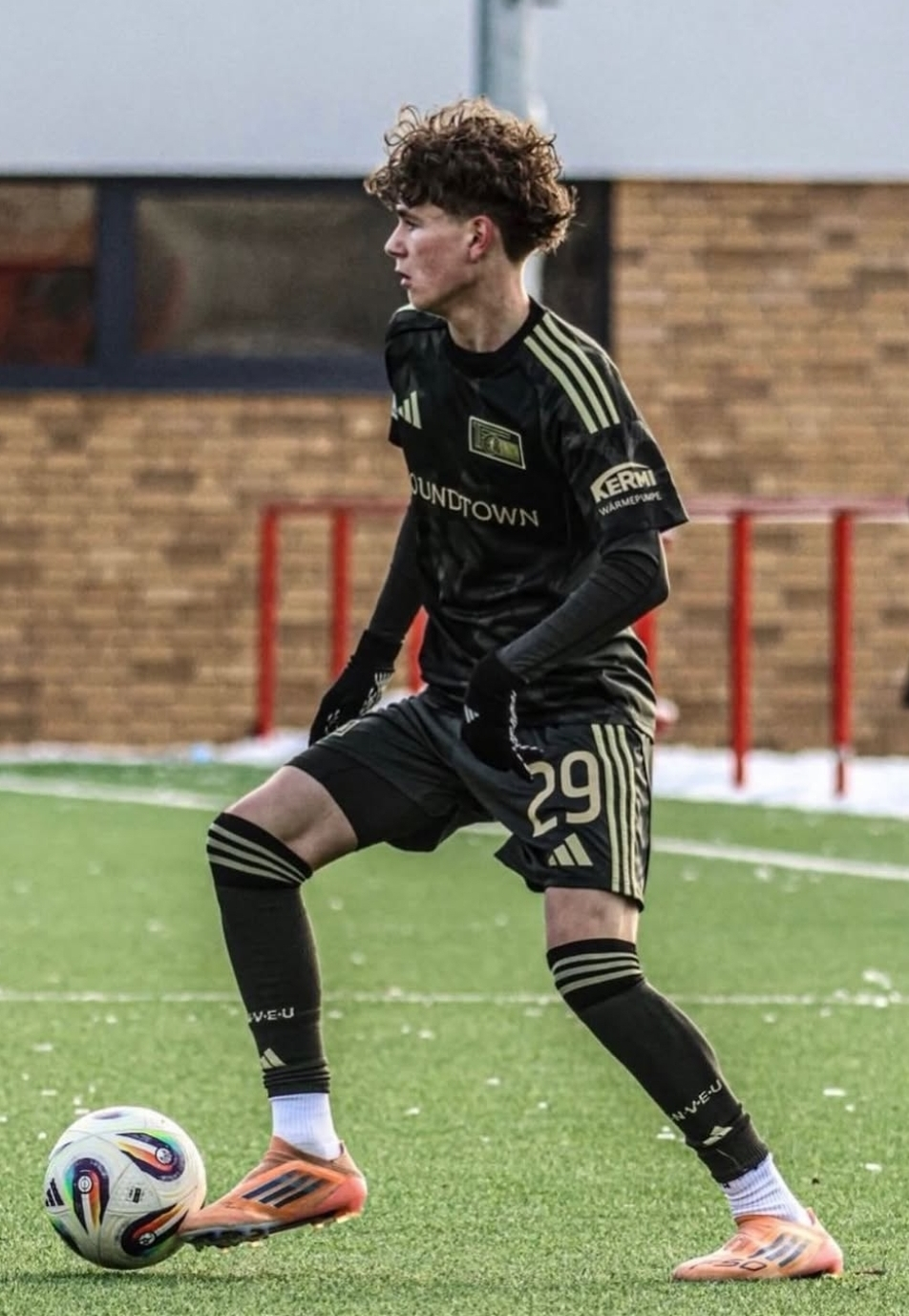
- Güther for Union Berlin's youth (2026)

Personal information
- Date of birth: 8 April 2010 (age 16)
- Place of birth: Spremberg, Germany
- Positions: Attacking midfielder; winger

Team information
- Current team: Union Berlin
- Number: 49

Youth career
- 2016–2022: Spremberger SV
- 2022–2025: Energie Cottbus
- 2025–: Union Berlin

Senior career*
Years	Team	Apps	(Gls)
2026–	Union Berlin	3	(0)

International career^{‡}
2025	Germany U15	2	(2)
2025–2026	Germany U16	9	(7)
2026–	Germany U17	4	(3)
- * Club domestic league appearances and goals as of 23:45, 8 November 2026 (UTC) ‡ National team caps and goals as of 23:45, 11 November 2026 (UTC)

Linus Güther (German pronunciation: [ˈliːnʊs ˈɡyːtɐ]; born 8 April 2010) is a German professional footballer who plays as an attacking midfielder or winger for Bundesliga club 1. FC Union Berlin. He is a German youth international.

== Club career ==
=== Professional debut ===
A youth product of Energie Cottbus, Güther moved to Union Berlin's academy in July 2025, where he continued his development at the U17s and U19s. He made his Bundesliga debut on 11 April 2026, in a 3–1 loss to 1. FC Heidenheim, getting subbed on in the 84th minute for Alex Král, becoming the second youngest Bundesliga player ever at 16 years and 3 days, with only Youssoufa Moukoko having claimingly been two days younger. Since it is not confirmed whether Moukoko's age is accurate or not, the possibility for Güther to be the youngest debutant yet remains. With his debut, Güther also became the first player in Bundesliga history to be born in the 2010s.

== International career ==
Güther is a youth international for Germany, having played for the U15 and U16, for whom he has been very prolific.

== Playing style ==
Güther is an attacking midfielder who can also operate on the wing. He is known for his game intelligence, dribbling ability, and strong finishing, as well as his two-footedness, which makes him unpredictable in attack. His style combines creativity and direct goal threat, drawing comparisons to Marco Reus and Florian Wirtz.

== Personal life ==
Güther was born in Spremberg, Brandenburg, in the district of Spree-Neiße. He is of Christian faith.

== Career statistics ==
As of match played 17 October 2026

Appearances and goals by club, season and competition
Club	Season	League			DFB-Pokal		Other		Total	
Club	Season	Division	Apps	Goals	Apps	Goals	Apps	Goals	Apps	Goals
1. FC Union Berlin	2025–26	Bundesliga	1	0	0	0	—		1	0
1. FC Union Berlin	2026–27	Bundesliga	1	0	0	0	—		1	0
Career total			2	0	0	0	—		2	0
