= András Schäfer =

Hungarian footballer (born 1999)

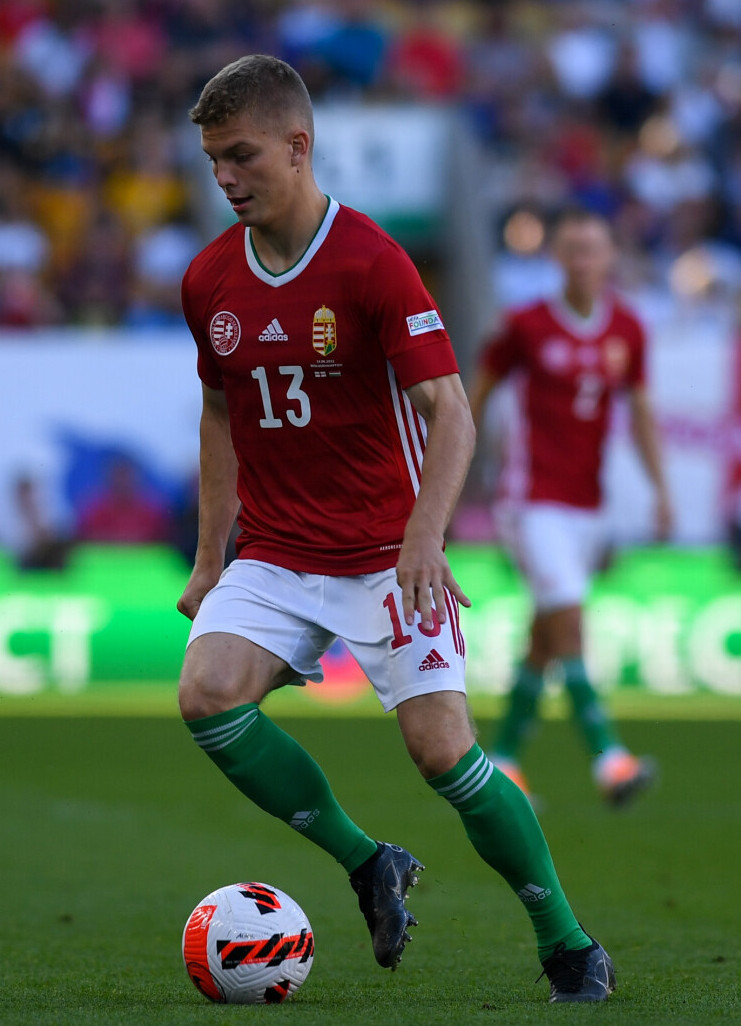
- Schäfer with Hungary in 2022.

Personal information
- Full name: András Schäfer
- Date of birth: 13 April 1999 (age 27)
- Place of birth: Szombathely, Hungary
- Height: 1.78 m (5 ft 10 in)
- Position: Centre midfielder

Team information
- Current team: Union Berlin
- Number: 13

Youth career
- 2008–2010: Grundball PFC
- 2010–2014: Haladás Szombathely
- 2014–2016: MTK Budapest

Senior career*
Years	Team	Apps	(Gls)
2016–2019	MTK Budapest	44	(5)
2019–2020	Genoa	0	(0)
2019–2020	→ Chievo Verona (loan)	0	(0)
2020	→ Dunajská Streda (loan)	8	(0)
2020–2022	Dunajská Streda	44	(3)
2022–	Union Berlin	106	(5)

International career^{‡}
- Hungary U18
2017–2018	Hungary U19	6	(0)
2020–	Hungary	51	(5)
- * Club domestic league appearances and goals as of 1 November 2026 ‡ National team caps and goals as of 18 November 2026

András Schäfer (born 13 April 1999) is a professional Hungarian football player who is a central midfielder for Bundesliga club Union Berlin and the Hungary national team.

== Club career ==
=== MTK Budapest ===
Schäfer made his Hungarian League debut for MTK, appearing as a substitute away against Gyirmót FC Győr on 1 April 2017.

=== Genoa and Dunajská Streda ===
In January 2019, Schäfer signed for Serie A club Genoa on a three-and-a-half-year contract for a fee of around €1 million. Having failed to appear for Genoa's first team since signing for them, he joined Serie B side Chievo Verona on loan in August 2019. He was recalled by Genoa in January 2020 after failing to play for Chievo.

On 17 January 2020, he joined Dunajská Streda, playing in the Fortuna Liga on loan until the end of the 2019–20 season, with an option to purchase. On 9 September 2020, it was announced that he had signed for the club permanently on a four-year contract.

=== Union Berlin ===
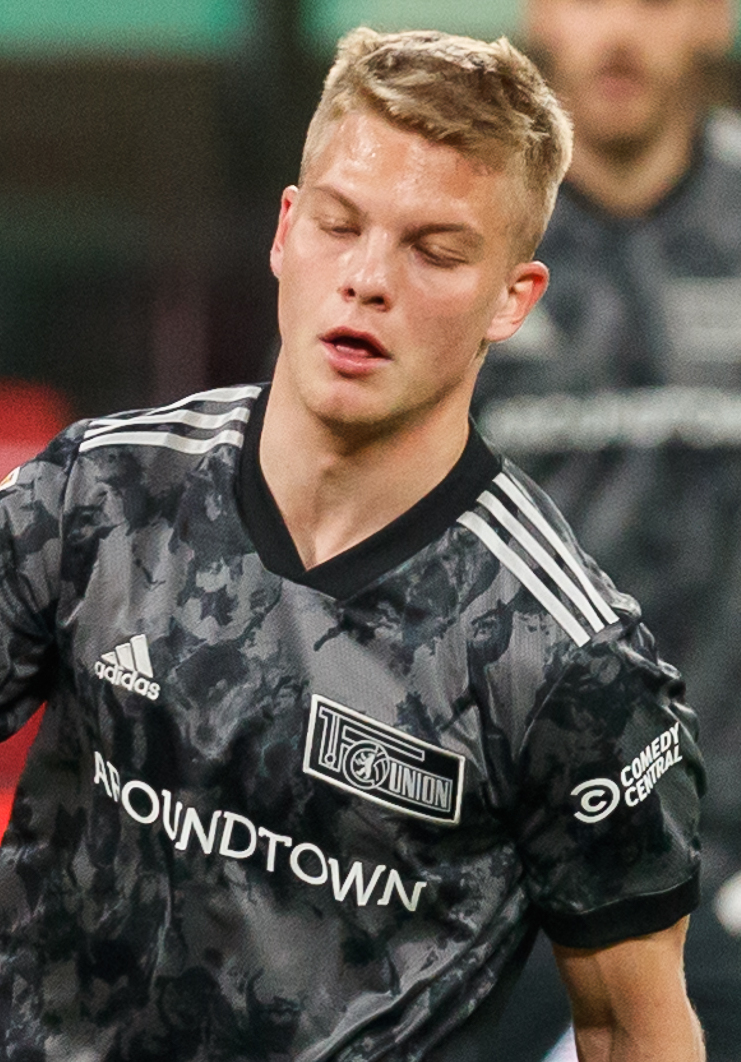
Schäfer with Union Berlin in 2022.

==== 2021–22 season ====
On 21 January 2022, Schäfer joined Union Berlin in the Bundesliga. On 7 May 2022, Schäfer scored his first goal in the Bundesliga on the 33rd game week of the 2021–22 Bundesliga season in a 4–1 away victory against SC Freiburg at the Europa-Park Stadion, Freiburg im Breisgau. In the 2021–22 Bundesliga season he earned 8 caps and scored 1 goal.

==== 2022–23 season ====
In the 2022–23 Bundesliga season he made 16 appearances. On 13 May 2023, he got injured in a 4–2 victory over SC Freiburg. After the match against SC Freiburg, he suffered an injury. On 19 May 2023, the diagnosis was revealed that he had broken his leg. On 2 June 2023, his foot was successfully operated on in Budapest. He also mentioned that he was going through the hardest time in his career due to this injury.

==== 2023–24 season ====
He returned from injury as a substitute in a 1–1 draw against FC Augsburg on 25 November 2023. He started against 1. FC Köln in a 2–0 home victory on 20 December 2023. He was substituted only in the 85th minute. On 24 February 2024, he scored the second goal in a 2–2 draw against 1. FC Heidenheim on the 23rd game week of the 2023–24 Bundesliga season. He was also selected into the best team of the 23rd game week of the Bundesliga, according to WhoScored. On 8 March 2024, he was sent off in a match against VfB Stuttgart. On 5 May 2024, he gave an assist to Chris Bedia in a 3–4 defeat against VfL Bochum.

In an interview with Union Berlin, he said that he and the whole team were relieved after avoiding relegation on the last matchday of the 2023–24 Bundesliga season. In the 2023-24 Bundesliga season he earned 20 caps and scored one goal.

==== 2024–25 season ====
On 21 December 2024, he scored his first goal in the 2024–25 Bundesliga season in a 4–1 defeat against SV Werder Bremen at the Stadion An der Alten Försterei, Berlin. In the 2024–25 Bundesliga season, he made 26 appearances in total.

==== 2025–26 season ====
On 20 December 2025, he scored his first goal in the 2025–26 Bundesliga season in a 1–0 victory over 1. FC Köln at the RheinEnergieStadion, Cologne. On 8 March 2026, he was sent off in the 19th minute in a 1–4 defeat from SV Werder Bremen.

== International career ==
Schäfer made his debut with the Hungary national team in a 1–0 UEFA Nations League win over Turkey on 3 September 2020.

On 1 June 2021, he was included in the final 26-man squad to represent Hungary at the rescheduled UEFA Euro 2020 tournament. On 4 June 2021, in a warm-up match for the tournament, he scored his first international goal to give the Magyars a 1–0 win over Cyprus. He started all three of Hungary's Group F matches, scoring the team's second goal against Germany in a 2–2 draw.

On 14 May 2024, Schäfer was named in Hungary's squad for UEFA Euro 2024. He played all three matches as Hungary finished third in Group A.

== Career statistics ==
=== Club ===
As of match played 1 November 2026

Appearances and goals by club, season and competition
Club	Season	League			National cup (Note: Includes Magyar Kupa, Slovak Cup, DFB-Pokal)		Europe		Total	
Club	Season	Division	Apps	Goals	Apps	Goals	Apps	Goals	Apps	Goals
MTK Budapest II	2016–17	Nemzeti Bajnokság III	7	1	0	0	–		7	1
MTK Budapest II	Total		7	1	0	0	0	0	7	1
MTK Budapest	2016–17	Nemzeti Bajnokság I	2	0	0	0	–		2	0
MTK Budapest	2017–18	Nemzeti Bajnokság II	28	4	6	2	–		34	6
MTK Budapest	2018–19	Nemzeti Bajnokság I	14	1	1	0	–		15	1
MTK Budapest	Total		44	5	7	2	0	0	51	7
Genoa	2018–19	Serie A	0	0	0	0	–		0	0
Chievo (loan)	2019–20	Serie A	0	0	0	0	–		0	0
Dunajská Streda (loan)	2019–20	Slovak Super Liga	8	0	3	1	–		11	1
Dunajská Streda	2020–21	Slovak Super Liga	27	0	1	0	3	0	31	0
Dunajská Streda	2021–22	Slovak Super Liga	17	3	1	0	2	0	20	3
Dunajská Streda	Total		52	3	5	1	5	0	62	4
Union Berlin	2021–22	Bundesliga	8	1	1	0	0	0	9	1
Union Berlin	2022–23	Bundesliga	16	0	2	0	5 (Note: Appearances in UEFA Europa League)	0	23	0
Union Berlin	2023–24	Bundesliga	20	1	0	0	0	0	20	1
Union Berlin	2024–25	Bundesliga	26	1	2	0	—		28	1
Union Berlin	2025–26	Bundesliga	28	2	2	0	—		30	2
Union Berlin	2026–27	Bundesliga	8	0	2	0	—		10	0
Union Berlin	Total		106	5	9	0	5	0	120	5
Career total			209	14	21	3	10	0	240	17

=== International ===
As of match played 17 November 2026

Appearances and goals by national team and year
National team	Year	Apps	Goals
Hungary	2020	4	0
Hungary	2021	11	3
Hungary	2022	7	0
Hungary	2024	12	0
Hungary	2025	7	1
Hungary	2026	10	1
Total		51	5

As of match played 9 June 2026

Scores and results list Hungary's goal tally first, score column indicates score after each Schäfer goal.

List of international goals scored by András Schäfer
No.	Date	Venue	Opponent	Score	Result	Competition
1	4 June 2021	Szusza Ferenc Stadion, Budapest, Hungary	Cyprus	1–0	1–0	Friendly
2	23 June 2021	Allianz Arena, Munich, Germany	Germany	2–1	2–2	UEFA Euro 2020
3	15 November 2021	PGE Narodowy, Warsaw, Poland	Poland	1–0	2–1	2022 FIFA World Cup qualification
4	20 March 2025	Rams Park, Istanbul, Turkey	Turkey	1–1	1–3	2024–25 UEFA Nations League promotion/relegation play-offs
5	9 June 2026	Nagyerdei Stadion, Debrecen, Hungary	Kazakhstan	2–1	3–1	Friendly

== Personal life ==
Schäfer father's side belongs to the German minority of Hungary with ancestors believed to be from Bavaria, and while he was not able to speak fluent German when he first moved to Union Berlin, he has been improving, and has recently been able to converse in German without needing a translator.

His father's, Péter Schafer, tattoos include the badges of his son's former football clubs.

In an interview published on Nemzeti Sport, Mátyás Esterházy, his and Dominik Szoboszlai's manager, said that the most important moment in 2023 was Schafer's return from his injury in November.

In December 2024, he married Luca.

== Philanthropy ==
In December 2024, he donated 15 million HUF (about €37,500) to save his former club, Szombathelyi Haladás, that was close to bankruptcy.

== Honours ==
Individual

- Slovak Super Liga Goal of the Month: July/August 2021
- Slovak Super Liga U-21 Team of the Season: 2020-21
