= Rani Khedira =

Tunisian footballer (born 1994)

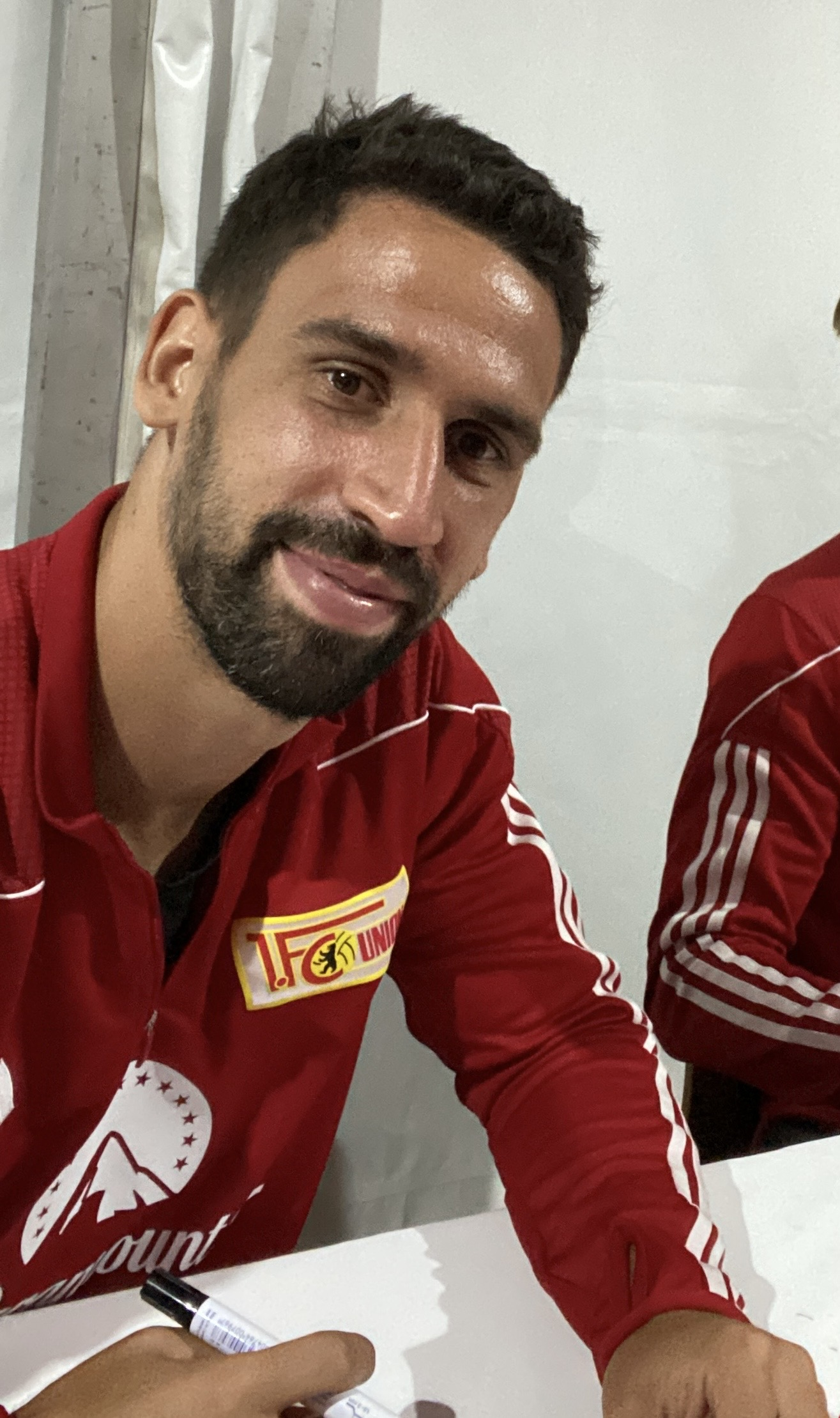
- Khedira with Union Berlin in 2023

Personal information
- Date of birth: 27 January 1994 (age 32)
- Place of birth: Stuttgart, Germany
- Height: 1.89 m (6 ft 2 in)
- Position: Defensive midfielder

Team information
- Current team: Union Berlin
- Number: 8

Youth career
- TV Oeffingen
- 2005–2012: VfB Stuttgart

Senior career*
Years	Team	Apps	(Gls)
2012–2014	VfB Stuttgart II	56	(1)
2014	VfB Stuttgart	9	(0)
2014–2017	RB Leipzig	51	(0)
2015–2016	RB Leipzig II	3	(2)
2017–2021	Augsburg	119	(6)
2021–	Union Berlin	157	(8)

International career
2009	Germany U15	2	(0)
2009	Germany U16	3	(0)
2011	Germany U17	6	(0)
2012–2013	Germany U19	2	(1)
2026--	Tunisia	6	(0)
- * Club domestic league appearances and goals as of 17:30, 1 November 2026 (UTC)

Rani Khedira (Arabic: راني خضيرة; born 27 January 1994) is a professional footballer who plays as a defensive midfielder for Bundesliga club Union Berlin. Born in Germany, he played for the Tunisia national team.

== Club career ==
=== VfB Stuttgart ===
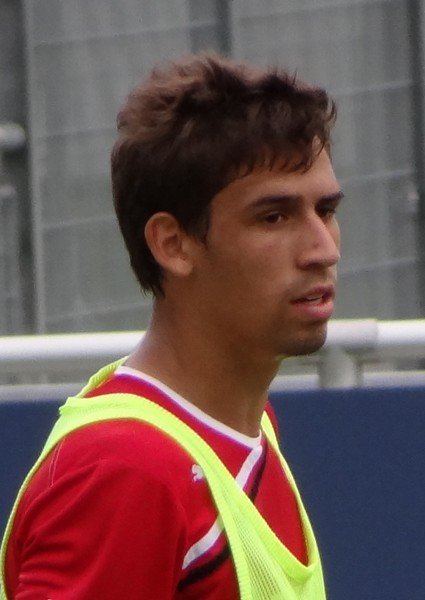
Khedira with VfB Stuttgart II in 2012

Khedira started his youth career at TV Oeffingen before moving to VfB Stuttgart in 2005, a year before his older brother, Sami, joined. After progressing the ranks of Stuttgart Academy, he began to play for the U16 side by 2009. He signed a contract with the club, keeping him until 2013. On 28 January 2012, Khedira had his debut for VfB Stuttgart II in the 3. Liga against FC Rot-Weiß Erfurt. During his time at VfB Stuttgart's reserves, he scored once for the side, in a 4–0 win over Wacker Burghausen on 8 September 2013.

On 23 October 2012, Khedira was promoted to the first team of VfB Stuttgart. He extended his contract with the club on 28 January 2013 until June 2015. However throughout the 2012–13 season, Khedira never made his first team appearances, as he appeared for most of the season as an unused substitute.

On 1 September 2013, Khedira made his Bundesliga debut for VfB Stuttgart in a 6–2 home victory against 1899 Hoffenheim. On 7 December 2013, when he made his first start for Stuttgart, in a 4–2 win over Hannover 96. From 29 January 2014 and 2 March 2014, he had a handful of starting his first team places. Although he lost his first team place later on, Khedira went on to make nine appearances for the club.

=== RB Leipzig ===
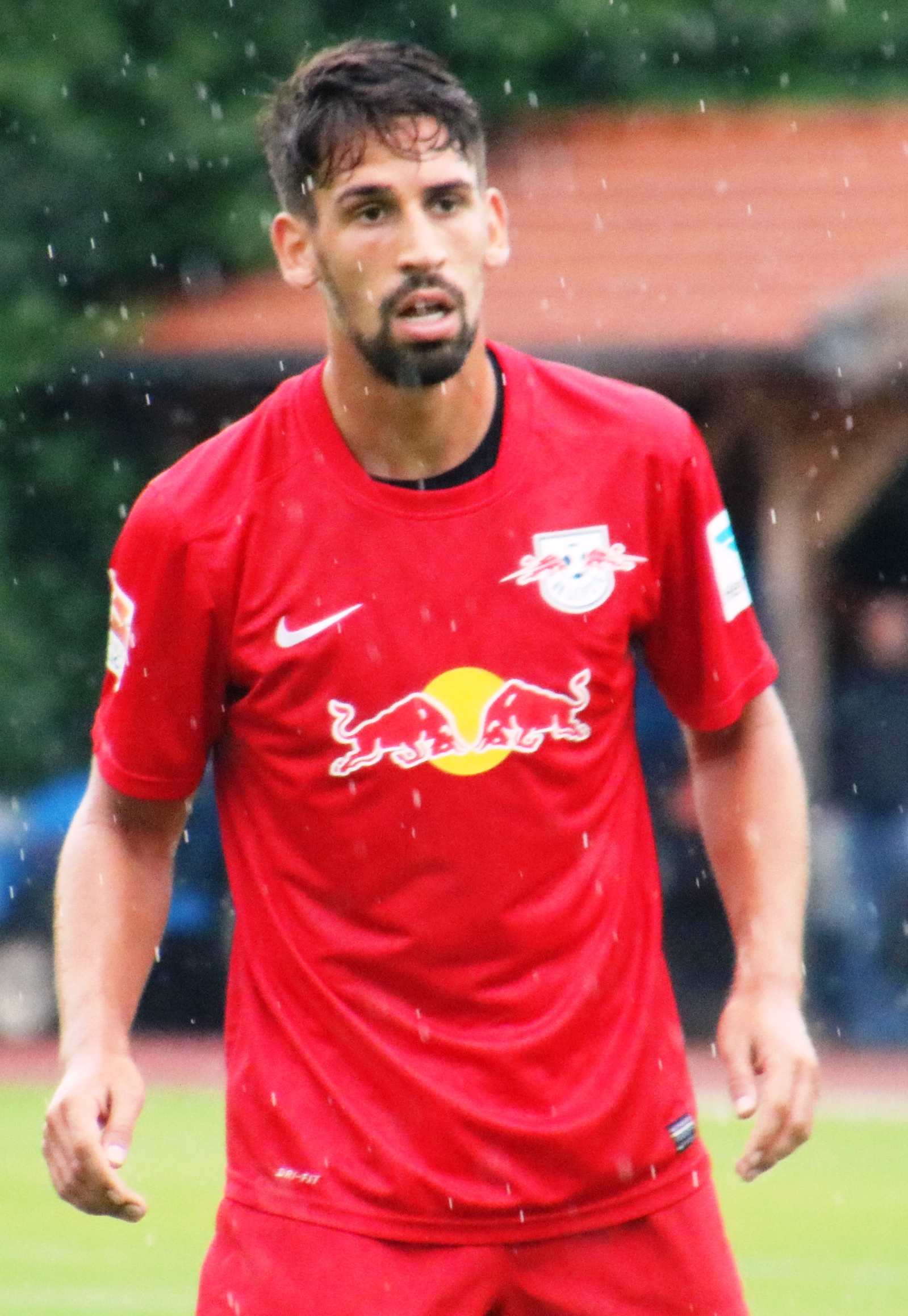
Khedira with RB Leipzig in 2016

For the 2014–15 season, Khedira moved to RB Leipzig, signing a three-year contract, keeping him until 2017. The move was reported to be undisclosed. RB Leipzig had been keen on signing him since September 2013.

Khedira made his RB Leipzig debut in the opening game of the season, playing the whole game, in a 0–0 draw against VfR Aalen. After making his RB Leipzig debut, he quickly established himself in the first team and played a key role for the club in his first season. He also became a regular start player from the beginning of the season until he was suspended for one match against SV Sandhausen on 30 November 2014 having picked up five yellow cards this season. However, in a 1–0 loss against FSV Frankfurt on 15 February 2015, he suffered a leg injury in the 69th minute and was substituted as a result. The injury kept him out of action for several weeks. On 17 May 2015, he returned to the first team from injury, in a 2–1 loss against Ingolstadt. In his first season at the club, Khedira went on to make 24 appearances in all competitions.

In his second season at RB Leipzig, Khedira found himself in a competition for his position and this resulted in him sitting on the substitutes bench at the start of the season. Later in the season, he was plagued by injuries. Nevertheless, he went on to make 16 appearances in all competitions, as RB Leipzig were promoted to the Bundesliga.

Ahead of the 2016–17 season, Khedira's first team opportunities continued to be limited and remained on the substitute bench following new competitions and by November, he had not made his first appearance of the season. On 25 November 2016, he made his first appearance of the 2016–17 season, coming on as a second-half substitute, in a 4–1 win over Freiburg. He went on to make ten appearances for the club this season. However, it was announced that Khedira was released by the club. He had previously been advised by his brother not to leave the club.

=== FC Augsburg ===
With his RB Leipzig contract expiring at the end of the 2016–17 season, Khedira joined fellow Bundesliga club FC Augsburg on 7 June 2017, signing a four-year contract.

=== Union Berlin ===
In April 2021, Khedira was announced to join Union Berlin starting from the 2021–22 season. On 19 March 2023, he scored his first goal at the club in a 2–0 win over Eintracht Frankfurt. On the final matchday of the 2022–23 season, he scored the only goal in a 1–0 victory over Werder Bremen, to secure the fourth place for his club in the league and qualification to the next season's Champions League.

== International career ==
After being featured for Germany U15 and Germany U16, Khedira was featured for Germany U17 and played for Germany at the 2011 FIFA U-17 World Cup, where he played five times in the tournament. The following year, Khedira was called up Germany U19 and immediately made an impact when he scored on his debut, in a 3–0 win over France U19 on 14 November 2012. He made another Germany U19 appearance on 25 March 2013, in a 2–0 win over Ukraine U19.

Three years on, Khedira earned a call-up by Germany U21 in November 2014. Through his father, he is also eligible to play for Tunisia, but he initially rejected call-ups to the team from the Tunisian FA.

In January 2026, Tunisia head coach Sabri Lamouchi and his assistant Michael Hefele travelled to Germany to renew discussions with Khedira regarding a potential switch of international allegiance ahead of the 2026 FIFA World Cup. In February 2026, it was reported that he had agreed in principle to join the Tunisian national team, with negotiations described as progressing positively. In March 2026, Khedira's request to switch international allegiance to Tunisia was approved by FIFA. He was subsequently selected for the squad, which took part in the 2026 FIFA World Cup in North America.

== Personal life ==
Khedira was born in Stuttgart to a German mother and a Tunisian father. He is the younger brother of retired Germany international Sami Khedira. He also has an older brother, Denny.

Khedira revealed that his father and older brother, Sami, influenced him to play football. On his preferred position, he said: "The Six is my primary position, but I've played as a centre-back, too, or have moved half a position forward when we're two-a-side, I think I can adapt anywhere." In response to being Sami's younger brother, Rani Khedira made it clear that he was not like his brother and that he wanted to go his own way. Khedira also revealed that he has a qualification as a sports and fitness salesman.

== Career statistics ==
=== Club ===
As of match played 1 November 2026

Appearances and goals by club, season and competition
Club	Season	League			DFB-Pokal		Europe		Total	
Club	Season	Division	Apps	Goals	Apps	Goals	Apps	Goals	Apps	Goals
VfB Stuttgart II	2011–12	3. Liga	12	0	—		—		12	0
VfB Stuttgart II	2012–13	3. Liga	32	0	—		—		32	0
VfB Stuttgart II	2013–14	3. Liga	12	1	—		—		12	1
VfB Stuttgart II	Total		56	1	—		—		56	1
VfB Stuttgart	2013–14	Bundesliga	9	0	0	0	—		9	0
RB Leipzig	2014–15	2. Bundesliga	22	0	2	0	—		24	0
RB Leipzig	2015–16	2. Bundesliga	19	0	1	0	—		20	0
RB Leipzig	2016–17	Bundesliga	10	0	0	0	—		10	0
RB Leipzig	Total		51	0	3	0	—		54	0
RB Leipzig II	2014–15	NOFV-Oberliga Süd	1	0	—		—		1	0
RB Leipzig II	2015–16	Regionalliga Nordost	2	2	—		—		2	2
RB Leipzig II	Total		3	2	—		—		3	2
FC Augsburg	2017–18	Bundesliga	30	1	1	0	—		31	1
FC Augsburg	2018–19	Bundesliga	30	4	4	0	—		34	4
FC Augsburg	2019–20	Bundesliga	32	0	1	0	—		33	0
FC Augsburg	2020–21	Bundesliga	27	1	2	0	—		29	1
FC Augsburg	Total		119	6	8	0	—		127	6
Union Berlin	2021–22	Bundesliga	32	0	5	0	8 (Note: Appearances in UEFA Europa Conference League)	0	45	0
Union Berlin	2022–23	Bundesliga	33	2	3	0	10 (Note: Appearances in UEFA Europa League)	0	46	2
Union Berlin	2023–24	Bundesliga	20	0	1	0	4 (Note: Appearances in UEFA Champions League)	0	25	0
Union Berlin	2024–25	Bundesliga	32	1	2	0	—		34	1
Union Berlin	2025–26	Bundesliga	32	5	2	1	—		34	6
Union Berlin	2026–27	Bundesliga	8	0	2	0	—		10	0
Union Berlin	Total		157	8	15	1	22	0	194	9
Career total			385	17	26	1	22	0	433	18

=== International ===
Appearances and goals by national team and year
National team	Year	Apps	Goals
Tunisia	2026	6	0
Total		6	0

== Honours ==
Germany U-17

- FIFA U-17 World Cup third place: 2011
