= Leopold Querfeld =

Austrian footballer (born 2003)

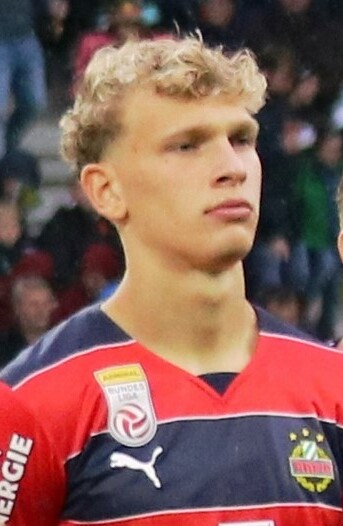
- Querfeld in 2022

Personal information
- Date of birth: 20 December 2003 (age 22)
- Place of birth: Vienna, Austria
- Height: 1.90 m (6 ft 3 in)
- Position: Centre-back

Team information
- Current team: Union Berlin
- Number: 14

Youth career
- 2010–2012: Union Mauer
- 2012–2020: Rapid Wien

Senior career*
Years	Team	Apps	(Gls)
2020–2022	Rapid Wien II	42	(1)
2021–2024	Rapid Wien	56	(4)
2024–	Union Berlin	62	(6)

International career^{‡}
2021	Austria U18	1	(0)
2021–2022	Austria U19	8	(2)
2022–	Austria U21	11	(1)
2024–	Austria	5	(0)
- * Club domestic league appearances and goals as of 24 October 2026 ‡ National team caps and goals as of 10 June 2025

Leopold Querfeld (born 20 December 2003) is an Austrian professional footballer who plays as a centre-back for Bundesliga club Union Berlin and the Austria national team.

== Biography ==
A youth product of Union Mauer, Querfeld moved to the academy of Rapid Wien in 2012. He began training with their reserves in 2020 and debuted for the first team in a 3–1 UEFA Europa League loss to Dinamo Zagreb on 4 November 2021.

Querfeld is a youth international for Austria, having represented his country at Austria U18 and U19 age levels. He debuted for the senior squad on 23 March 2024 in a friendly against Slovakia.

On 14 June 2024, Querfeld signed with Union Berlin in Germany.

== Career statistics ==
=== Club ===
As of match played 24 October 2026

Appearances and goals by club, season and competition
Club	Season	League			Cup		Continental		Other		Total	
Club	Season	Division	Apps	Goals	Apps	Goals	Apps	Goals	Apps	Goals	Apps	Goals
Rapid Wien II	2020–21	Austrian Football Second League	21	0	—		—		—		21	0
Rapid Wien II	2021–22	Austrian Football Second League	20	0	—		—		—		20	0
Rapid Wien II	2022–23	Austrian Football Second League	1	1	—		—		—		1	1
Rapid Wien II	Total		42	1	—		—		—		42	1
Rapid Wien	2021–22	Austrian Bundesliga	5	0	0	0	2 (Note: One appearance in UEFA Europa League, one appearance in UEFA Europa Conference League)	0	2 (Note: Appearances in Bundesliga EC Play-off)	0	9	0
Rapid Wien	2022–23	Austrian Bundesliga	23	1	2	0	1 (Note: Appearances in UEFA Europa Conference League)	0	—		26	1
Rapid Wien	2023–24	Austrian Bundesliga	28	3	4	0	4	0	—		36	2
Rapid Wien	Total		56	4	6	0	7	0	2	0	71	4
Union Berlin	2024–25	Bundesliga	27	2	1	0	—		—		28	2
Union Berlin	2025–26	Bundesliga	31	3	3	4	—		—		34	7
Union Berlin	2026–27	Bundesliga	4	1	1	0	—		—		5	1
Union Berlin	Total		62	6	5	4	—		—		67	10
Career total			160	11	11	4	7	0	2	0	180	15

=== International ===
As of 10 June 2025

Appearances and goals by national team and year
National team	Year	Apps	Goals
Austria	2024	4	0
Austria	2025	1	0
Total		5	0

== Honours ==
Individual

- Bundesliga Goal of the Season: 2024–25
