= Matheo Raab =

German footballer

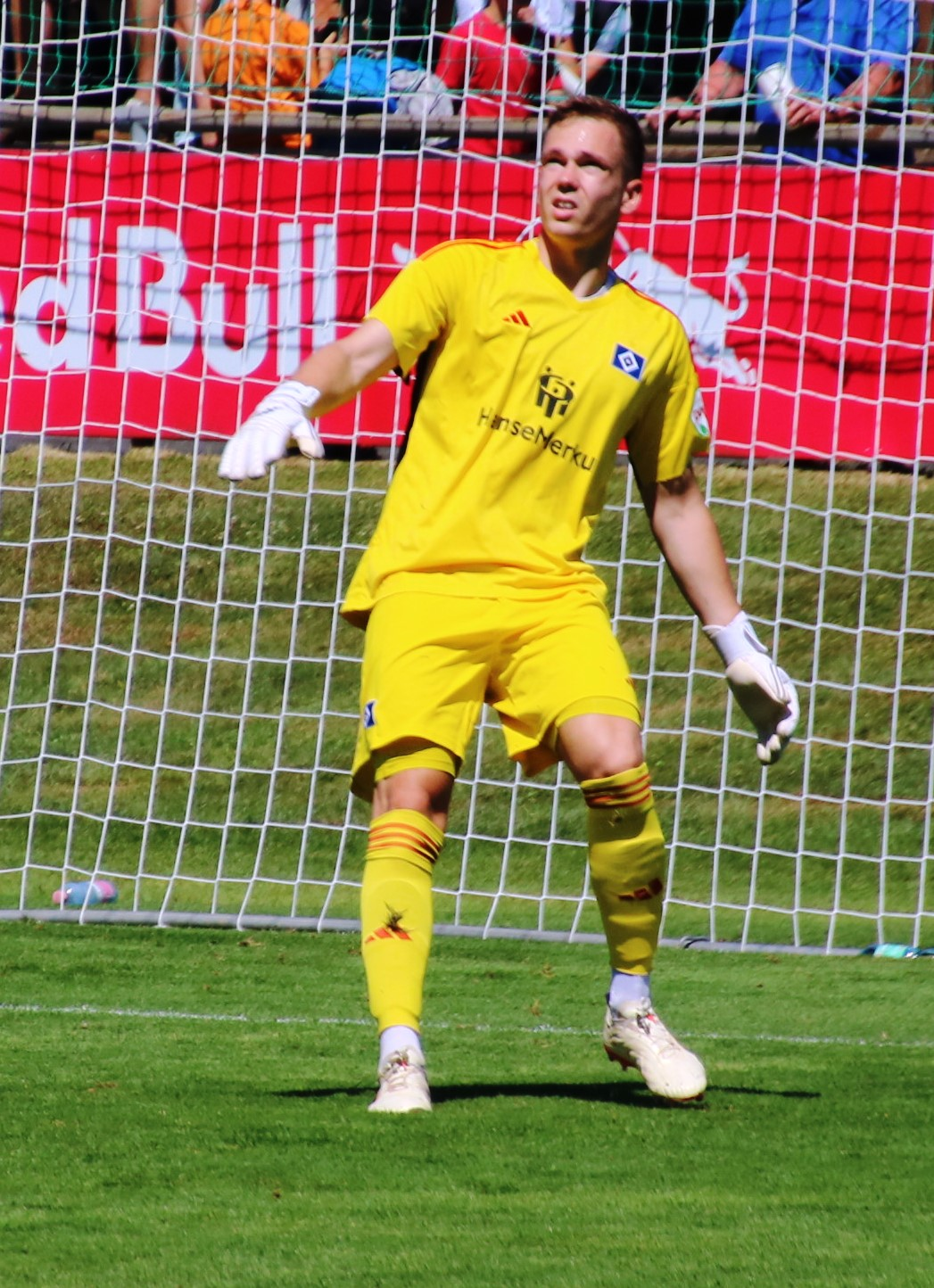
- Matheo Raab playing for Hamburger SV in 2023.

Personal information
- Date of birth: 18 December 1998 (age 27)
- Place of birth: Weilburg, Germany
- Height: 1.86 m (6 ft 1 in)
- Position: Goalkeeper

Team information
- Current team: Union Berlin
- Number: 31

Youth career
- –2016: Sportfreunde Eisbachtal
- 2016–2017: Eintracht Trier

Senior career*
Years	Team	Apps	(Gls)
2017–2020	1. FC Kaiserslautern II	27	(0)
2020–2022	1. FC Kaiserslautern	38	(0)
2022–2025	Hamburger SV	18	(0)
2025–	Union Berlin	2	(0)
- * Club domestic league appearances and goals as of 29 August 2026

Matheo Raab (born 18 December 1998) is a German professional footballer who plays as a goalkeeper for Bundesliga club Union Berlin.

== Club career ==
On 3 June 2022, Raab signed a four-year contract with 2. Bundesliga club Hamburger SV.

On 11 July 2025, he signed with Bundesliga club Union Berlin.

== Career statistics ==
As of match played 29 August 2026

Appearances and goals by club, season and competition
Club	Season	League			Cup		Other		Total	
Club	Season	Division	Apps	Goals	Apps	Goals	Apps	Goals	Apps	Goals
1. FC Kaiserslautern II	2017–18	Oberliga Rheinland-Pfalz/Saar	5	0	—		—		5	0
1. FC Kaiserslautern II	2018–19	Oberliga Rheinland-Pfalz/Saar	10	0	—		—		10	0
1. FC Kaiserslautern II	2019–20	Oberliga Rheinland-Pfalz/Saar	11	0	—		—		11	0
1. FC Kaiserslautern II	2020–21	Oberliga Rheinland-Pfalz/Saar	1	0	—		—		1	0
1. FC Kaiserslautern II	Total		27	0	—		—		27	0
1. FC Kaiserslautern	2019–20	3. Liga	0	0	—		—		0	0
1. FC Kaiserslautern	2020–21	3. Liga	4	0	0	0	—		4	0
1. FC Kaiserslautern	2021–22	3. Liga	34	0	1	0	2	0	37	0
1. FC Kaiserslautern	Total		38	0	1	0	2	0	41	0
Hamburger SV	2022–23	2. Bundesliga	1	0	0	0	0	0	1	0
Hamburger SV	2023–24	2. Bundesliga	14	0	3	0	—		17	0
Hamburger SV	2024–25	2. Bundesliga	3	0	1	0	—		4	0
Hamburger SV	Total		18	0	4	0	0	0	22	0
Union Berlin	2025–26	Bundesliga	1	0	1	0	—		2	0
Union Berlin	2026–27	Bundesliga	1	0	1	0	—		2	0
Union Berlin	Total		2	0	2	0	—		4	0
Career total			85	0	7	0	2	0	94	0
