= 2025–26 1. FC Union Berlin season =

1. FC Union Berlin
2025–26 season
- President: Dirk Zingler
- Head coach: Steffen Baumgart (until 11 April); Marie-Louise Eta (Interim, from 11 April)
- Stadium: Stadion An der Alten Försterei
- Bundesliga: 11th
- DFB-Pokal: Round of 16
- Top goalscorer: League: Oliver Burke (6); All: Leopold Querfeld (7)
- Highest home attendance: 22,012
- Lowest home attendance: 21,732
- Average home league attendance: 21,990
- Biggest win: FC Gütersloh 0–5 Union Berlin (15 August 2025)
- Biggest defeat: Bayern Munich 4–0 Union Berlin (21 March 2026)
Home colours	Away colours	Third colours
- All statistics correct as of 16 May 2026.

The 2025–26 season is the 120th season in the history of 1. FC Union Berlin, and the club's seventh consecutive season in the Bundesliga. In addition to the domestic league, the club participated in the DFB-Pokal.

== Coaching staff ==
Position	Staff
Head coach	(Germany) Steffen Baumgart (until 11 April) (Germany) Marie-Louise Eta (Interim, from 11 April)
Assistant coach	(Germany) Sebastian Bönig
Goalkeeper coach	(Austria) Michael Gspurning
Athletic coach	(Germany) Martin Krüger
Rehab coach	(Germany) Johannes Thienel
Game Analysis	(Germany) Tobias Drössler
Assistant Coach/Match Analyst	(Germany) Adrian Wittmann

== Players ==
=== First team ===
No.	Player	Nat.	Positions	Date of birth (age)	Place of birth	Signed in	Contract ends	Signed from	Transfer fee	Apps.	Goals
Goalkeepers
1	Frederik Rønnow	(Denmark)	GK	4 August 1992 (age 34)	(Denmark) Horsens	2021	2026	(Germany) Eintracht Frankfurt	€2.8M	127	0
25	Carl Klaus	(Germany)	GK	16 January 1994 (age 32)	(Germany) Stuttgart	2024	-	(Germany) 1. FC Nürnberg	Free	4	0
31	Matheo Raab	(Germany)	GK	18 December 1999 (age 26)	(Germany) Weilburg	2025	-	(Germany) Hamburger SV	€400k	1	0
Defenders
4	Diogo Leite	(Portugal)	CB	23 January 1999 (age 27)	(France) Forbach	2023	2026	(Portugal) Porto	€7M	85	1
5	Danilho Doekhi	(Germany)	CB	30 June 1998 (age 28)	(Netherlands) Rotterdam	2022	2026	(Netherlands) Vitesse	Free	117	13
14	Leopold Querfeld	(Austria)	CB	20 December 2003 (age 22)	(Austria) Vienna	2024	-	(Austria) Rapid Wien	€3M	58	5
15	Tom Rothe	(Germany)	LB	29 October 2004 (age 21)	(Germany) Rendsburg	2024	-	(Germany) Borussia Dortmund	€5M	47	5
18	Josip Juranović	(Croatia)	RB	16 August 1995 (age 31)	(Croatia) Zagreb	2023	2027	(Scotland) Celtic	€8.55m	61	3
28	Christopher Trimmel (Captain)	(Austria)	RB	24 February 1987 (age 39)	(Austria) Oberpullendorf	2014	2026	(Austria) Rapid Wien	Free	345	5
34	Stanley Nsoki	(France)	DF	9 April 1999 (age 27)	(France) Poissy	2025	2026	(Germany) 1899 Hoffenheim	Loan	13	1
39	Derrick Köhn	(Ghana)	LB	4 February 1999 (age 27)	(Germany) Hamburg	2025	2029	(Turkey) Galatasaray	€4M	29	2
Midfielders
6	Aljoscha Kemlein	(Germany)	DM	2 August 2004 (age 22)	(Germany) Berlin	2023	-	Academy		47	1
8	Rani Khedira (vice captain)	(Tunisia)	DM	27 January 1994 (age 32)	(Germany) Stuttgart	2021	2026	(Germany) Augsburg	Free	149	8
11	Jeong Woo-yeong	(South Korea)	AM	20 September 1999 (age 27)	(South Korea) Incheon	2025	-	(Germany) VfB Stuttgart	€4M	28	4
13	András Schäfer	(Hungary)	CM	13 April 1999 (age 27)	(Hungary) Szombathely	2022	2026	(Slovakia) Dunajská Streda	€1M	98	5
19	Janik Haberer	(Germany)	CM	2 April 1994 (age 32)	(Germany) Wangen im Allgäu	2022	2027	(Germany) SC Freiburg	Free	108	6
21	Tim Skarke	(Germany)	CM	7 September 1996 (age 30)	(Germany) Heidenheim	2022	-	(Germany) Darmstadt 98	Free	58	1
24	Robert Skov	(Denmark)	LM	20 May 1996 (age 30)	(Spain) Marbella	2024	Undisclosed	Free agent	Undisclosed	18	2
33	Alex Král	(Slovakia)	DM	19 May 1998 (age 28)	(Slovakia) Košice	2024	Undisclosed	(Russia) Spartak Moscow	Free	44	0
49	Lins Guether	(Germany)	CM	15 January 2005 (age 21)	(Germany) Berlin	2025	-	Academy		1	0
Forwards
7	Oliver Burke	(Scotland)	RW	7 April 1997 (age 29)	(Scotland) Kirkcaldy	2025	2029	(Germany) Werder Bremen	Free	29	6
9	Livan Burcu	(Turkey)	LW	28 September 2004 (age 22)	(Germany) Frankfurt	2024	-	(Germany) SV Sandhausen	€300k	18	1
10	Ilyas Ansah	(Germany)	ST	8 November 2004 (age 21)	(Germany) Lüdenscheid	2025	-	(Germany) SC Paderborn	€4M	33	5
17	David Preu	(Germany)	LW	26 October 2004 (age 21)	(Germany) München	2023	-	Academy		5	0
23	Andrej Ilić	(Serbia)	CF	3 April 2000 (age 26)	(Socialist Federal Republic of Yugoslavia) Belgrade	2025	2027	(France) Lille	€5M	32	5
Players who left on loan
20	László Bénes	(Slovakia)	CM	9 September 1997 (age 29)	(Slovakia) Dunajská Streda	2024	Undisclosed	(Germany) Hamburger SV	€3M	23	1
27	Marin Ljubičić	(Croatia)	CF	28 February 2002 (age 24)	(Croatia) Split	2025	-	(Austria) LASK	€4.5M	13	1

== Transfers ==
=== In ===
Date	Pos.	Player	From	Fee	Ref.
1 July 2025	DF	(Germany) Andrik Markgraf	Academy		
1 July 2025	DF	(Germany) Oluwaseun Ogbemudia	Academy		
1 July 2025	MF	(South Korea) Jeong Woo-yeong	(Germany) VfB Stuttgart	€4,000,000	
1 July 2025	FW	(Serbia) Andrej Ilić	(France) Lille	€5,000,000	
1 July 2025	FW	(Germany) Benedict Hollerbach	(Germany) Mainz 05	€10,000,000	
1 July 2025	FW	(Germany) Ilyas Ansah	(Germany) SC Paderborn	€4,000,000	
1 July 2025	FW	(Scotland) Oliver Burke	(Germany) Werder Bremen	Free transfer	
11 July 2025	GK	(Germany) Matheo Raab	(Germany) Hamburger SV	€400,000	

=== Out ===
Date	Pos.	Player	To	Fee	Ref.
1 July 2025	GK	(Germany) Alexander Schwolow	(Scotland) Heart of Midlothian	Free transfer	
1 July 2025	DF	(Guadeloupe) Jérôme Roussillon	(England) Charlton Athletic	Free transfer	
1 July 2025	DF	(Germany) Robin Gosens	(Italy) Fiorentina	€7,000,000	
1 July 2025	MF	(Germany) Kevin Volland	(Germany) 1860 Munich	Free transfer	
1 July 2025	FW	(Croatia) Ivan Prtajin	(Germany) 1. FC Kaiserslautern	€1,000,000	
7 July 2025	DF	(Germany) Kevin Vogt	(Germany) VfL Bochum	Free transfer	
9 July 2025	GK	(Germany) Lennart Grill	(Germany) Dynamo Dresden	Free transfer	
15 July 2025	DF	(Germany) Paul Jaeckel	(Germany) Preußen Münster	€300,000	

== Pre-season and friendlies ==
12 July 2025 Friendly	Brandenburger 03	1–9	Union Berlin	Brandenburg
15:30 CEST (UTC+2)	Richter 30'	Report	Ali 10'; Ilić 15', 21', 41', 45+2'; Markgraf 37'; Ljubičić 57'; Tousart 67'; Burcu 71'	Stadium: Werner-Seelenbinder-Sportplatz; Attendance: 2,980

13 July 2025 Friendly	1908 Grün-Weiss	0–5	Union Berlin	Ahrensfelde
15:30 CEST (UTC+2)		Report	Ljubičić 1'; Benes 20'; Ali 48'; Haberer 71'; Burke 75'	Stadium: Jahnsportstätte; Attendance: 3,700

19 July 2025 Friendly	LASK	0–2	Union Berlin	Linz, Austria
14:30 CEST (UTC+2)		Report	Tousart 45+2'; Ansah 63'	Stadium: Raiffeisen Arena; Attendance: 6,422

20 July 2025 Friendly	Rapid Wien	1–1	Union Berlin	Vienna, Austria
16:00 CEST (UTC+2)	Mbuyi 68'	Report	Skarke 42'	Stadium: Allianz Stadion; Attendance: 19,348

26 July 2025 Friendly	Greuther Fürth	1–0	Union Berlin	Fürth
14:00 CEST (UTC+2)	Hrgota 54'	Report		Stadium: Sportpark Ronhof; Attendance: 6,322

29 July 2025 Friendly	Schweinfurt 05	1–0	Union Berlin	Herzogenaurach
15:30 CEST (UTC+2)	Thomann 81'	Report		Stadium: Adi Dassler stadium Attendance: 560

29 July 2025 Friendly	Union Berlin	0–1	Espanyol	Berlin, Germany
15:30 CEST (UTC+2)		Report	Puado	Stadium: Stadion An der Alten Försterei; Attendance: 18,122

9 August 2025 Friendly	Union Berlin	0–1	Olympiacos	Berlin, Germany
15:30 CEST (UTC+2)		Report	Chiquinho 74'	Stadium: Stadion An der Alten Försterei; Attendance: 14,322

8 October 2025 Friendly	FSV Luckenwalde	0–3	Union Berlin	Luckenwalde, Germany
18:30 CEST (UTC+2)		Report	Skarke 13'; Ljubičić 52'; Megaptche 80'	Stadium: Werner-Seelenbinder-Sportpark; Attendance: 2,212

== Competitions ==
=== Overall record ===
Competition	First match	Last match	Starting round	Final position	Record							
Competition	First match	Last match	Starting round	Final position	Pld	W	D	L	GF	GA	GD	Win %
Bundesliga	23 August 2025	16 May 2026	Matchday 1	11th	34	10	9	15	44	58	−14	29.41
DFB-Pokal	15 August 2025	3 December 2025	First round	Round of 16	3	2	0	1	9	4	+5	66.67
Total					37	12	9	16	53	62	−9	32.43

Last updated: 16 May 2026
Source: DFB

=== Bundesliga ===
==== League table ====
Pos	Team	Pld	W	D	L	GF	GA	GD	Pts
9	FC Augsburg	34	12	7	15	45	61	−16	43
10	Mainz 05	34	10	10	14	44	53	−9	40
11	Union Berlin	34	10	9	15	44	58	−14	39
12	Borussia Mönchengladbach	34	9	11	14	42	53	−11	38
13	Hamburger SV	34	9	11	14	40	54	−14	38

Source: Bundesliga
Rules for classification: 1) Points; 2) Goal difference; 3) Goals scored; 4) Head-to-head results; 5) Head-to-head away goals scored; 6) Away goals scored; 7) Play-off.
(Rules 4–6 only apply after home and away matches have been played between the tied teams.)

==== Results summary ====
Overall								Home						Away					
Pld	W	D	L	GF	GA	GD	Pts	W	D	L	GF	GA	GD	W	D	L	GF	GA	GD
34	10	9	15	44	58	−14	39	5	7	5	26	26	0	5	2	10	18	32	−14

Last updated: 16 May 2026.
Source: Bundesliga

==== Results by round ====
Round	1	2	3	4	5	6	7	8	9	10	11	12	13	14	15	16	17	18	19	20	21	22	23	24	25	26	27	28	29	30	31	32	33	34
Ground	H	A	H	A	H	A	H	A	H	H	A	H	A	H	A	H	A	A	H	A	H	A	H	A	H	A	A	H	A	H	A	H	A	H
Result	W	L	L	W	D	L	W	L	D	D	W	L	L	W	W	D	D	D	L	L	D	L	W	L	L	W	L	D	L	L	L	D	W	W
Position	6	10	14	10	11	13	10	10	10	11	8	12	10	8	8	9	9	9	9	9	9	10	9	10	11	9	9	11	11	11	13	12	12	11
Points	3	3	3	6	7	7	10	10	11	12	15	15	15	18	21	22	23	24	24	24	25	25	28	28	28	31	31	32	32	32	32	33	36	39

Updated to match(es) played on 16 May 2026. Source: Bundesliga
A = Away; H = Home; W = Win; D = Draw; L = Loss

==== Matches ====
The match schedule was released on 27 June 2025.

23 August 2025 1	Union Berlin	2–1	VfB Stuttgart	Berlin
15:30 CEST (UTC+2)	Ansah 18', 45+4'; Trimmel (yellow card) 26'; Haberer (yellow card) 50'; Khedira (yellow card) 58'; Ilić (yellow card) 82'	Report	Undav (yellow card) 33'; Demirović (yellow card) 36'; Vagnoman (yellow card) 52'; Leweling (yellow card) 83'; Tomás 86'	Stadium: Stadion An der Alten Försterei; Attendance: 22,012; Referee: Robert Hartmann

31 August 2025 2	Borussia Dortmund	3–0	Union Berlin	Dortmund
17:30 CEST (UTC+2)	Guirassy 44', 58'; Nmecha 81'	Report		Stadium: Westfalenstadion; Attendance: 81,365; Referee: Daniel Schlager

13 September 2025 3	Union Berlin	2–4	TSG Hoffenheim	Berlin
17:30 CEST (UTC+2)	Ansah 49'; Rothe 71', (red card) 82'	Report	Kramarić 45+1' (pen.); Asllani 45+3', 51', (yellow card) 57'; Lemperle 83' (pen.)	Stadium: Stadion An der Alten Försterei; Attendance: 21,732; Referee: Tobias Welz

21 September 2025 4	Eintracht Frankfurt	3–4	Union Berlin	Frankfurt
15:30 CEST (UTC+2)	Brown 45+4'; Dōan (yellow card) 62'; Uzun 80'; Burkardt 87' (pen.); Collins (yellow card) 88'	Report	Ansah 9'; Burke 32', 53', 56'; Querfeld (yellow card) 86'; Ilić (yellow card) 90+7'	Stadium: Waldstadion; Attendance: 59,500; Referee: Sven Jablonski

28 September 2025 5	Union Berlin	0–0	Hamburger SV	Berlin
19:30 CEST (UTC+2)	Querfeld (yellow card) 79'; Trimmel (yellow card) 90+1'	Report	Muheim (yellow card) 38'; Phillipe (yellow card) 71'	Stadium: Stadion An der Alten Försterei; Attendance: 22,012; Referee: Deniz Aytekin

4 October 2025 6	Bayer Leverkusen	2–0	Union Berlin	Leverkusen
15:30 CEST (UTC+2)	Poku 33'; Kofane (yellow card) 45+6', (goal) 49'	Report	Leite (yellow card) 66'; Trimmel (yellow card) 68'; Köhn (yellow card) 76'	Stadium: BayArena; Attendance: 30,210; Referee: Christian Dingert

17 October 2025 7	Union Berlin	3–1	Borussia Mönchengladbach	Berlin
20:30 CEST (UTC+2)	Doekhi 3', 26'; Trimmel (yellow card) 37'; Köhn (yellow card) 49'; Khedira 81'; Querfeld (yellow card) 89'; Haberer (yellow card) 89'	Report	Tabaković 33'; castrop (yellow card) 36'; Reyna (yellow card) 90+4'	Stadium: Stadion An der Alten Försterei; Attendance: 22,012; Referee: Tobias Reichel

24 October 2025 8	Werder Bremen	1–0	Union Berlin	Bremen
20:45 CEST (UTC+2)	Coulibaly (yellow card) 23'; Grüll (yellow card) 70', (goal) 72'; Topp (yellow card) 90+1'; Pieper (yellow card) 90+2'	Report		Stadium: Weserstadion; Attendance: 42,100; Referee: Daniel Schlager

1 November 2025 9	Union Berlin	0–0	SC Freiburg	Berlin
15:30 CET (UTC+1)	Khedira (yellow card) 28'; Haberer (yellow card) 45+3'; Ilić (yellow card) 76'; Trimmel (yellow card) 83'; Rothe (yellow card) 84'; Král (yellow card) 88'; Baumgart (yellow card) 90+7'	Report	Junior Adamu (yellow card) 1'	Stadium: Stadion An der Alten Försterei; Attendance: 22,012; Referee: Sören Storks

8 November 2025 10	Union Berlin	2–2	Bayern Munich	Berlin
15:30 CET (UTC+1)	Doekhi 27', 83' (yellow card) 88'; Haberer (yellow card) 36'	Report	Laimer (yellow card) 15'; Díaz 38'; Stanišić (yellow card) 63'; Olise (yellow card) 82'; Kane 90+3'; Kimmich (yellow card) 90+7'	Stadium: Stadion An der Alten Försterei; Attendance: 22,012; Referee: Florian Exner

23 November 2025 11	FC St. Pauli	0–1	Union Berlin	St. Pauli
17:30 CET (UTC+1)	Fujita (yellow card) 38'	Report	Khedira (yellow card) 44', (goal) 46'	Stadium: Millerntor-Stadion; Attendance: 29,546; Referee: Tobias Stieler

29 November 2025 12	Union Berlin	1–2	1. FC Heidenheim	Berlin
15:30 CET (UTC+1)	Burke (yellow card) 13'; Khedira 43', (yellow card) 75'; Kemlein (yellow card) 72'	Report	Gimber (yellow card) 46'; Schimmer (yellow card) 66', (goal) 90'; Schöppner 90+5'	Stadium: Stadion An der Alten Försterei; Attendance: 22,012; Referee: Patrick Ittrich

6 December 2025 13	VfL Wolfsburg	3–1	Union Berlin	Wolfsburg
15:30 CET (UTC+1)	Wimmer 10'; Kumbedi (yellow card) 22'; Amoura 30'; Eriksen (yellow card) 45+2'; Majer 59' (yellow card) 74'; Koulierakis (yellow card) 90'	Report	Nsoki 68'; Burke (yellow card) 79'	Stadium: Volkswagen Arena; Attendance: 23,045; Referee: Robert Schröder

12 December 2025 14	Union Berlin	3–1	RB Leipzig	Berlin
20:30 CET (UTC+1)	Haberer (yellow card) 37'; Doekhi (yellow card) 55'; Burke 57'; Ansah 64'; Skarke 90+3'	Report	Raum (yellow card) 50'; Gomis 60'; Harder (yellow card) 72'	Stadium: Stadion An der Alten Försterei; Attendance: 22,012; Referee: Daniel Schlager

20 December 2025 15	1. FC Köln	0–1	Union Berlin	Cologne
15:30 CET (UTC+1)	Sebulonsen (yellow card) 13'; Krauß (yellow card) 49'; van den Berg (red card) 82'		Trimmel (yellow card) 40'; Kemlein (yellow card) 80'; Schäfer (yellow card) 88', (goal) 90+1'; Juranović (yellow card) 90+4'; Rønnow (yellow card) 90+8'	Stadium: RheinEnergieStadion; Attendance: 50,000; Referee: Christian Dingert

10 January 2026 16	Union Berlin	2–2	Mainz 05	Berlin
15:30 CET (UTC+1)	Leite (yellow card) 19'; Doekhi (yellow card) 57'; Jeong Woo-yeong 77'; Ljubičić 86'		Amiri 30'; Hollerbach 69'	Stadium: Stadion An der Alten Försterei; Attendance: 22,012; Referee: Bastian Dankert

15 January 2026 17	Augsburg	1–1	Union Berlin	Augsburg
20:30 CET (UTC+1)	Claude-Maurice 45+6'; Jakić (yellow card) 53'	Report	Köhn (red card) 89'; Ljubičić 90+1'	Stadium: WWK Arena; Attendance: 27,267; Referee: Florian Badstübner

18 January 2026 18	VfB Stuttgart	1–1	Union Berlin	Stuttgart
15:30 CET (UTC+1)	Vagnoman (yellow card) 41'; Führich 59'	Report	Burcu (yellow card) 1'; Jeong 83'	Stadium: MHPArena; Attendance: 59,500; Referee: Deniz Aytekin

24 January 2026 19	Union Berlin	0–3	Borussia Dortmund	Berlin
18:30 CET (UTC+1)		Report	Can 10' (pen.) (yellow card) 59'; Schlotterbeck 53'; Beier 84'	Stadium: Stadion An der Alten Försterei; Attendance: 22,012; Referee: Robert Hartmann

31 January 2026 20	TSG Hoffenheim	3–1	Union Berlin	Hoffenheim
15:30 CET (UTC+1)	Hajdari (yellow card) 8'; Kramarić 42' (pen.), 45'; Leite 47' (o.g.); Prass (yellow card) 84'	Report	Nsoki (yellow card) 21'; Ilić (yellow card) 57'; Khedira 68'	Stadium: PreZero Arena; Attendance: 19,341; Referee: Robin Braun

6 February 2026 21	Union Berlin	1–1	Eintracht Frankfurt	Berlin
20:30 CET (UTC+1)	Schäfer (yellow card) 68'; Kemlein (yellow card) 72'; Köhn (yellow card) 73'; Querfeld 87' (pen.); Haberer (yellow card) 89'	Report	Kalimuendo (yellow card) 25'; Højlund (yellow card) 36' (yellow-red card) 86'	Stadium: Stadion An der Alten Försterei; Attendance: 22,012; Referee: Sören Storks

14 February 2026 22	Hamburger SV	3–2	Union Berlin	Hamburg
15:30 CET (UTC+1)	Königsdörffer 35', 82'; Capaldo 45+2' (yellow card) 64'; Vušković (yellow card) 50'; Polzin (yellow card) 90+1'; Mikelbrencis (yellow card) 90+7'	Report	Querfeld 28' (pen.); Ilić 89'	Stadium: Volksparkstadion; Attendance: 57,000; Referee: Florian Badstübner

21 February 2026 23	Union Berlin	1–0	Bayer Leverkusen	Berlin
15:30 CET (UTC+1)	Nsoki (yellow card) 3'; Haberer (yellow card) 10'; Khedira 28'; Ilić (yellow card) 44'; Querfeld (yellow card) 60'; Rønnow (yellow card) 90+3'	Report	Hofmann (yellow card) 84'; Andrich (yellow card) 88'	Stadium: Stadion An der Alten Försterei; Attendance: 22,012; Referee: Harm Osmers

28 February 2026 24	Borussia Mönchengladbach	1–0	Union Berlin	Mönchengladbach
15:30 CET (UTC+1)	Reitz (yellow card) 25'; Scally (yellow card) 34'; Engelhardt (yellow card) 89'; Diks 90+4' (pen.); Stöger (yellow card) 90+8'	Report	Trimmel (yellow card) 20'; Haberer (yellow card) 64'; Khedira (yellow card) 64'; Burcu (yellow card) 88'; Ansah (yellow card) 89'	Stadium: Borussia-Park; Attendance: 52,488; Referee: Matthias Jöllenbeck

8 March 2026 25	Union Berlin	1–4	Werder Bremen	Berlin
17:30 CET (UTC+1)	Köhn 18' (pen.); Schäfer (red card) 19'; Querfeld (yellow card) 69'	Report	Stark (yellow card) 16'; Deman 31'; Stage 35'; Topp (yellow card) 36'; Grüll 66'; Malatini (yellow card) 78'; Čović 90+4'	Stadium: Stadion An der Alten Försterei; Attendance: 22,012; Referee: Timo Gerach

15 March 2026 26	SC Freiburg	0–1	Union Berlin	Freiburg
17:30 CET (UTC+1)		Report	Köhn (yellow card) 17'; Jeong 90+2'; Burcu (yellow card) 90+3'	Stadium: Europa-Park Stadion; Attendance: 33,200; Referee: Sven Jablonski

21 March 2026 27	Bayern Munich	4–0	Union Berlin	Munich
15:30 CET (UTC+1)	Upamecano (yellow card) 3'; Olise 43'; Gnabry 45+1', 67'; Kane 49'	Report	Querfeld (yellow card) 30'; Doekhi (yellow card) 37'	Stadium: Allianz Arena; Attendance: 75,000; Referee: Patrick Ittrich

5 April 2026 28	Union Berlin	1–1	FC St. Pauli	Berlin
15:30 CEST (UTC+2)	Ilić 52'	Report	Pereira Lage 25'; Irvine (yellow card) 85' (yellow-red card) 90+3'	Stadium: Stadion An der Alten Försterei; Attendance: 22,012; Referee: Tobias Welz

11 April 2026 29	Heidenheim	3–1	Union Berlin	Heidenheim
15:30 CEST (UTC+2)	Honsak 9', 36'; Zivzivadze 79'	Report	Burke (yellow card) 31'; Querfeld 75'; Güther (yellow card) 87'	Stadium: Voith-Arena; Attendance: 15,000; Referee: Christian Dingert

18 April 2026 30	Union Berlin	1–2	VfL Wolfsburg	Berlin
15:30 CEST (UTC+2)	Khedira (yellow card) 78'; Burke 86'	Report	Wimmer 11'; Pejčinović 46'; Belocian (yellow card) 58'	Stadium: Stadion An der Alten Försterei; Attendance: 22,012; Referee: Florian Badstübner

25 April 2026 31	RB Leipzig	3–1	Union Berlin	Leipzig
20:30 CEST (UTC+2)	Finkgräfe 22'; Cardoso 25'; Baumgartner (yellow card) 35'; Baku 63'	Report	Doekhi 78'; Leite (yellow card) 84'	Stadium: Red Bull Arena; Attendance: 47,800; Referee: Sven Jablonski

2 May 2026 32	Union Berlin	2–2	1. FC Köln	Berlin
15:30 CEST (UTC+2)	Leite (yellow card) 34'; Rothe 73'; Burcu 89' (yellow card) 90+6'	Report	Martel (yellow card) 31'; Bülter 33'; Simpson-Pusey (yellow card) 55'; El Mala 61'; Schwäbe (yellow card) 89'	Stadium: Stadion An der Alten Försterei; Attendance: 22,012; Referee: Daniel Schlager

11 May 2026 33	Mainz 05	1–3	Union Berlin	Mainz
19:30 CEST (UTC+2)	Caci (yellow card) 7'; Becker 48'; Lee Jae-sung (yellow card) 75'	Report	Ilić 38'; Köhn (yellow card) 80'; Burke 88'; Juranović 90+1'	Stadium: Mewa Arena; Attendance: 32,600; Referee: Florian Exner

16 May 2026 34	Union Berlin	4–0	Augsburg	Berlin
15:30 CEST (UTC+2)	Ilić 10', 42'; Burke (yellow card) 24'; Trimmel (yellow card) 26'; Schäfer 54'; Kemlein (yellow card) 70'; Jeong Woo-yeong 74'	Report	Massengo (yellow card) 63'	Stadium: Stadion An der Alten Försterei; Attendance: 22,012; Referee: Patrick Ittrich

=== DFB-Pokal ===
15 August 2025 First round	FC Gütersloh	0–5	Union Berlin	Gütersloh
18:00 CEST (UTC+2)		Report	Skov 19'; Querfeld 35'; Doekhi 43'; Ilić 78'; Jeong Woo-yeong 90+4'	Stadium: Heidewaldstadion; Attendance: 9,236; Referee: Jarno Wienefeld

28 October 2025 Second round	Union Berlin	2–1	Arminia Bielefeld	Berlin
15:30 CET (UTC+1)	Leopold Querfeld 11'; Schäfer (yellow card) 29'; Ilić (yellow card) 66'; Doekhi (yellow card) 95', (goal) 106'	Report	Momuluh 27'; Bazee (yellow card) 46'; Mehlem (yellow card) 99'	Stadium: Stadion An der Alten Försterei; Attendance: 22,012; Referee: Harm Osmers

2 December 2025 Round of 16	Union Berlin	2–3	Bayern Munich	Berlin
20:00 CET (UTC+1)	Querfeld 40' (pen.), 55' (pen.); Ansah (yellow card) 80'; Kemlein (yellow card) 87'; Burcu (yellow card) 90+2'	Report	Ansah 12' (o.g.); Kane 24' (yellow card) 54'; Leite 45+4' (o.g.); Kompany (yellow card) 55'; Upamecano (yellow card) 81'; Neuer (yellow card) 90+1'	Stadium: Stadion An der Alten Försterei; Attendance: 22,012; Referee: Matthias Jöllenbeck

== Statistics ==
=== Appearances ===
No.	Pos.	Player	Bundesliga	DFB-Pokal	Total
1	GK	(Denmark) Frederik Rønnow	30+0	3+0	33+0
4	DF	(Portugal) Diogo Leite	23+0	2+0	25+0
5	DF	(Netherlands) Danilho Doekhi	34+0	3+0	37+0
6	MF	(Germany) Aljoscha Kemlein	23+7	1+1	24+8
7	FW	(Scotland) Oliver Burke	21+8	1+1	22+9
8	MF	(Tunisia) Rani Khedira	32+0	3+0	35+0
9	FW	(Turkey) Livan Burcu	6+12	0+1	6+13
10	FW	(Germany) Ilyas Ansah	23+10	3+0	26+10
11	MF	(South Korea) Jeong Woo-yeong	13+15	1+2	14+17
13	MF	(Hungary) András Schäfer	16+12	3+0	19+12
14	DF	(Austria) Leopold Querfeld	30+1	3+0	33+1
15	DF	(Germany) Tom Rothe	10+11	3+0	13+11
17	FW	(Germany) David Preu	0+0	0+0	0+0
18	DF	(Croatia) Josip Juranović	3+8	0+0	3+8
19	MF	(Germany) Janik Haberer	20+8	1+2	21+10
21	FW	(Germany) Tim Skarke	4+18	1+2	5+20
23	FW	(Serbia) Andrej Ilić	24+8	2+0	26+8
24	MF	(Denmark) Robert Skov	3+0	1+0	4+0
25	GK	(Germany) Carl Klaus	3+1	0+0	3+1
28	DF	(Austria) Christopher Trimmel	22+7	2+0	24+7
31	GK	(Germany) Matheo Raab	0+0	0+1	0+1
33	MF	(Czech Republic) Alex Král	2+18	0+1	2+19
34	DF	(France) Stanley Nsoki	10+3	0+1	10+4
39	DF	(Ghana) Derrick Köhn	21+8	0+0	21+8
49	MF	(Germany) Linus Güther	0+1	0+0	0+1
Players transferred out during the season
	FW	(Croatia) Marin Ljubičić	0+2	0+0	0+2

Last updated: 16 May 2026.
Source: FBref.com

=== Goalscorers ===
Rank	No.	Pos.	Player	Bundesliga	DFB-Pokal	Total
1	14	DF	(Austria) Leopold Querfeld	3	4	7
2	7	FW	(Scotland) Oliver Burke	6	0	6
3	8	MF	(Tunisia) Rani Khedira	5	1	6
3	5	DF	(Netherlands) Danilho Doekhi	5	1	6
3	23	FW	(Serbia) Andrej Ilić	5	1	6
6	10	FW	(Germany) Ilyas Ansah	5	0	5
7	11	MF	(South Korea) Jeong Woo-yeong	4	1	5
8	13	MF	(Hungary) András Schäfer	2	0	2
8	15	DF	(Germany) Tom Rothe	2	0	2
8	27	FW	(Croatia) Marin Ljubičić	2	0	2
11	9	MF	(Turkey) Livan Burcu	1	0	1
11	18	DF	(Croatia) Josip Juranović	1	0	1
11	21	MF	(Germany) Tim Skarke	1	0	1
11	39	DF	(Ghana) Derrick Köhn	1	0	1
11	34	DF	(France) Stanley Nsoki	1	0	1
11	24	MF	(Denmark) Robert Skov	0	1	1
Total				44	9	53

Last updated: 16 May 2026.
Source: FBref.com

=== Top assists ===
Rank	No.	Pos.	Player	Bundesliga	DFB-Pokal	Total
1	23	FW	(Serbia) Andrej Ilić	9	0	9
2	28	DF	(Austria) Christopher Trimmel	3	1	4
3	7	FW	(Scotland) Oliver Burke	2	0	2
3	6	MF	(Germany) Aljoscha Kemlein	2	0	2
3	39	DF	(Germany) Derrick Köhn	2	0	2
3	34	DF	(France) Stanley Nsoki	2	0	2
7	9 players			1	0	1
8	5 players			0	1	1
Total				29	6	35

Last updated: 16 May 2026.
Source: FBref.com

=== Clean sheets ===
Rank	No.	Pos.	Player	Bundesliga	DFB-Pokal	Total
1	1	GK	(Denmark) Frederik Rønnow	5	1	6
2	31	GK	(Germany) Matheo Raab	1	1	2
Total				6	1	7

Last updated: 21 March 2026.
Source: FBref.com

=== Discipline ===
As of 16 May 2026.

No.	Pos.	Player	Bundesliga			DFB-Pokal			Total		
No.	Pos.	Player	Booked	(yellow card) (yellow-red card)	Sent off (straight red)	Booked	(yellow card) (yellow-red card)	Sent off (straight red)	Booked	(yellow card) (yellow-red card)	Sent off (straight red)
1	GK	(Denmark) Frederik Rønnow	2	0	0	0	0	0	2	0	0
4	DF	(Portugal) Diogo Leite	4	0	0	0	0	0	4	0	0
5	DF	(Netherlands) Danilho Doekhi	4	0	0	1	0	0	5	0	0
6	MF	(Germany) Aljoscha Kemlein	4	0	0	1	0	0	5	0	0
7	FW	(Scotland) Oliver Burke	4	0	0	0	0	0	4	0	0
8	MF	(Tunisia) Rani Khedira	7	0	0	0	0	0	7	0	0
9	FW	(Turkey) Livan Burcu	3	0	0	0	0	0	3	0	0
10	FW	(Germany) Ilyas Ansah	1	0	0	1	0	0	2	0	0
11	MF	(South Korea) Jeong Woo-yeong	0	0	0	0	0	0	0	0	0
13	MF	(Hungary) András Schäfer	2	0	1	1	0	0	3	0	1
14	DF	(Austria) Leopold Querfeld	6	0	0	0	0	0	6	0	0
15	DF	(Germany) Tom Rothe	1	0	1	0	0	0	1	0	1
17	FW	(Germany) David Preu	0	0	0	0	0	0	0	0	0
18	DF	(Croatia) Josip Juranović	1	0	0	0	0	0	1	0	0
19	MF	(Germany) Janik Haberer	8	0	0	0	0	0	8	0	0
21	FW	(Germany) Tim Skarke	0	0	0	0	0	0	0	0	0
23	FW	(Serbia) Andrej Ilić	5	0	0	1	0	0	6	0	0
24	MF	(Denmark) Robert Skov	0	0	0	0	0	0	0	0	0
25	GK	(Germany) Carl Klaus	0	0	0	0	0	0	0	0	0
28	DF	(Austria) Christopher Trimmel	8	0	0	0	0	0	8	0	0
31	GK	(Germany) Matheo Raab	0	0	0	0	0	0	0	0	0
33	MF	(Czech Republic) Alex Král	1	0	0	0	0	0	1	0	0
34	DF	(France) Stanley Nsoki	2	0	0	0	0	0	2	0	0
39	DF	(Ghana) Derrick Köhn	5	0	1	0	0	0	5	0	1
49	FW	(Germany) Linus Güther	1	0	0	0	0	0	1	0	0
Players transferred out during the season
27	FW	(Croatia) Marin Ljubičić	0	0	0	0	0	0	0	0	0
Total			69	0	3	5	0	0	74	0	3

Last updated: 16 May 2026.
Source: FBref.com
