= Ilyas Ansah =

German footballer (born 2004)

- Ansah in 2025

Personal information
- Date of birth: 8 November 2004 (age 22)
- Place of birth: Lüdenscheid, Germany
- Height: 1.94 m (6 ft 4 in)
- Position: Striker

Team information
- Current team: Hull City
- Number: 28

Youth career
- 2011–2017: SC Lüdenscheid
- 2017–2018: VfL Bochum
- 2018–2021: Eintracht Dortmund
- 2021–2022: Sportfreunde Siegen
- 2022–2023: SC Paderborn

Senior career*
Years	Team	Apps	(Gls)
2023–2025	SC Paderborn	57	(7)
2023–2024	→ SC Paderborn II	24	(12)
2025–2026	Union Berlin	33	(5)
2026–	Hull City	0	(0)

International career^{‡}
2023–2025	Germany U20	12	(5)
2025–2026	Germany U21	6	(1)
- * Club domestic league appearances and goals as of 10:53, 1 September 2026 (UTC) ‡ National team caps and goals as of 18:58, 19 November 2025 (UTC)

Ilyas Ansah (born 8 November 2004) is a German professional football player who plays as a striker for Premier League club Hull City.

== Club career ==
=== SC Paderborn ===
Ansah is a youth product of the German clubs SC Lüdenscheid, VfL Bochum, Eintracht Dortmund, Sportfreunde Siegen and SC Paderborn. In 2023, he was promoted to Paderborn's reserves in the Oberliga, helping them earn promotion to the Regionalliga. On 26 June 2023, he signed his first professional contract with Paderborn. On 22 September 2023, he debuted with the senior Paderborn side in a 1–1 tie in the 2. Bundesliga with 1. FC Magdeburg. On 25 January 2024, he extended his contract with Paderborn until 2027. On 6 June 2025, he transferred to the Bundesliga side Union Berlin.

=== Union Berlin ===
He made his Bundesliga debut with the Köpenick side on 23 August 2025 and made an immediate impact, scoring in the 18th minute and in stoppage time of the first half, providing Union's first two goals of the season en route to a 2–1 win against VfB Stuttgart.

=== Hull City ===
On 1 September 2026, Ansah joined English Premier League newly promoted club Hull City on a deal reportedly worth £12.8m with a further £10.5 million in add-ons.

== International career ==
Born in Germany, Ansah is of Ghanaian and French descent from his mother. Ansah holds Ghanaian and French nationalities from his parents. He is a youth international for Germany, having been called up to the Germany U20s from 2023 to 2025.

== Career statistics ==
As of match played 23 August 2026

Appearances and goals by club, season and competition
Club	Season	League			National cup (Note: Includes DFB-Pokal, FA Cup)		League cup (Note: Includes EFL Cup)		Total	
Club	Season	Division	Apps	Goals	Apps	Goals	Apps	Goals	Apps	Goals
SC Paderborn II	2022–23	Oberliga Westfalen	10	6	—		—		10	6
SC Paderborn II	2023–24	Regionalliga West	14	6	—		—		14	6
SC Paderborn II	Total		24	12	—		—		24	12
SC Paderborn	2023–24	2. Bundesliga	24	1	1	0	—		25	1
SC Paderborn	2024–25	2. Bundesliga	33	6	2	0	—		35	6
SC Paderborn	Total		57	7	3	0	—		60	7
Union Berlin	2025–26	Bundesliga	33	5	2	0	—		35	5
Union Berlin	2026–27	Bundesliga	0	0	1	0	—		1	0
Union Berlin	Total		33	5	3	0	—		36	5
Hull City	2026–27	Premier League	0	0	0	0	0	0	0	0
Career total			114	24	6	0	0	0	120	24
