= Tom Rothe =

German footballer (born 2004)

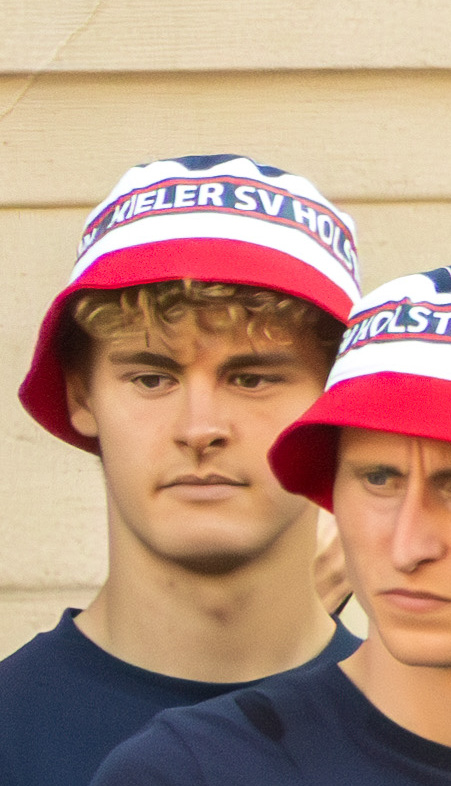

Personal information
- Full name: Tom Alexander Rothe
- Date of birth: 29 October 2004 (age 22)
- Place of birth: Rendsburg, Germany
- Height: 1.92 m (6 ft 4 in)
- Positions: Left-back; center-back

Team information
- Current team: Union Berlin
- Number: 15

Youth career
- FC St. Pauli
- 2021–2022: Borussia Dortmund

Senior career*
Years	Team	Apps	(Gls)
2022–2024	Borussia Dortmund	4	(1)
2023	Borussia Dortmund II	13	(0)
2023–2024	→ Holstein Kiel (loan)	33	(4)
2024–	Union Berlin	54	(5)

International career^{‡}
2020	Germany U17	1	(0)
2022–2023	Germany U19	9	(0)
2023–	Germany U21	11	(2)
- * Club domestic league appearances and goals as of 17:30, 24 October 2026 (UTC) ‡ National team caps and goals as of 20:35, 17 November 2026 (UTC)

Tom Alexander Rothe (born 29 October 2004) is a German professional footballer who plays as a left-back for Bundesliga club Union Berlin.

== Club career ==
Rothe joined Borussia Dortmund from FC St. Pauli in 2021. On 16 April 2022, he scored on his debut against Wolfsburg in a 6–1 win.

On 27 June 2023, he joined Holstein Kiel on a one-year loan move.

On 7 August 2024, Rothe signed with Union Berlin.

== Career statistics ==
=== Club ===
As of match played 24 October 2026

Appearances and goals by club, season and competition
Club	Season	League			Cup		Continental		Other		Total	
Club	Season	Division	Apps	Goals	Apps	Goals	Apps	Goals	Apps	Goals	Apps	Goals
Borussia Dortmund	2021–22	Bundesliga	2	1	0	0	0	0	0	0	2	1
Borussia Dortmund	2022–23	Bundesliga	2	0	0	0	3 (Note: Appearances in UEFA Champions League)	0	—		5	0
Borussia Dortmund	Total		4	1	0	0	3	0	0	0	7	1
Borussia Dortmund II	2022–23	3. Liga	13	0	—		—		—		13	0
Holstein Kiel (loan)	2023–24	2. Bundesliga	33	4	2	0	—		—		35	4
Union Berlin	2024–25	Bundesliga	26	3	1	0	—		—		27	3
Union Berlin	2025–26	Bundesliga	21	2	2	0	—		—		23	2
Union Berlin	2026–27	Bundesliga	7	0	1	1	—		—		8	1
Union Berlin	Total		54	5	4	1	—		—		58	6
Career total			104	10	5	1	3	0	0	0	112	11
