= Janik Haberer =

German footballer

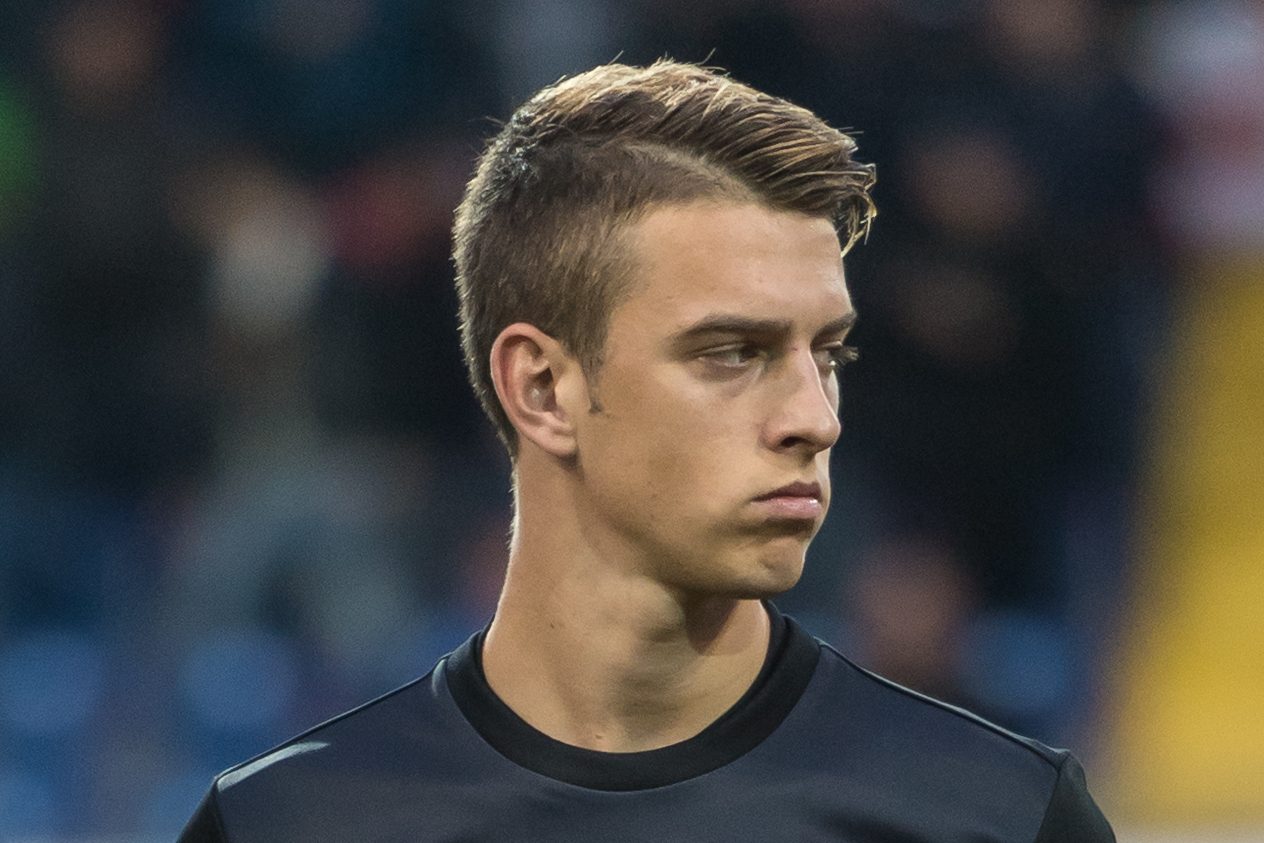
- Haberer with Germany U21 in 2016

Personal information
- Date of birth: 2 April 1994 (age 32)
- Place of birth: Wangen im Allgäu, Germany
- Height: 1.86 m (6 ft 1 in)
- Position: Midfielder

Team information
- Current team: Union Berlin
- Number: 19

Youth career
- 1999–2005: FC Wangen
- 2006–2009: FV Ravensburg
- 2009–2010: FC Memmingen
- 2011–2012: SpVgg Unterhaching

Senior career*
| Years | Team | Apps | (Gls) |
| 2012 | SpVgg Unterhaching II | 7 | (1) |
| 2012–2014 | SpVgg Unterhaching | 53 | (10) |
| 2014–2015 | 1899 Hoffenheim II | 17 | (1) |
| 2014–2016 | 1899 Hoffenheim | 0 | (0) |
| 2015–2016 | → VfL Bochum (loan) | 33 | (3) |
| 2016–2022 | SC Freiburg | 158 | (12) |
| 2019 | SC Freiburg II | 1 | (0) |
| 2022– | Union Berlin | 116 | (8) |

International career
| 2012 | Germany U19 | 1 | (0) |
| 2013–2014 | Germany U20 | 7 | (0) |
| 2015–2017 | Germany U21 | 9 | (1) |
Medal record
UEFA European Under-21 Championship
| Winner | 2017 |
- * Club domestic league appearances and goals as of 1 November 2026

Janik Haberer (born 2 April 1994) is a German professional footballer who plays as a midfielder for Bundesliga club Union Berlin.

== Career ==
On 9 May 2022, SC Freiburg announced that after six seasons with the club, Haberer would sign with Union Berlin for the 2022–23 Bundesliga season. On 16 October 2022, he scored his first Bundesliga brace in a 2–0 win for Union Berlin against Borussia Dortmund. On the final matchday of the 2023–24 season, he netted a stoppage-time goal in a 2–1 win over his former club SC Freiburg, securing Union's continued presence in the Bundesliga.

== Career statistics ==
=== Club ===
As of match played 1 November 2026

Appearances and goals by club, season and competition
| Club | Season | League | | | Cup | | Continental | | Total | |
| Club | Season | Division | Apps | Goals | Apps | Goals | Apps | Goals | Apps | Goals |
|---|---|---|---|---|---|---|---|---|---|---|
| SpVgg Unterhaching | 2011–12 | 3. Liga | 3 | 1 | 0 | 0 | — | | 3 | 1 |
| SpVgg Unterhaching | 2012–13 | 3. Liga | 15 | 1 | 0 | 0 | — | | 15 | 1 |
| SpVgg Unterhaching | 2013–14 | 3. Liga | 35 | 8 | — | | — | | 35 | 8 |
| SpVgg Unterhaching | Total | | 53 | 10 | 0 | 0 | 0 | 0 | 53 | 10 |
| SpVgg Unterhaching II | 2012–13 | Bayernliga Süd | 7 | 1 | — | | — | | 7 | 1 |
| 1899 Hoffenheim | 2014–15 | Bundesliga | 0 | 0 | 0 | 0 | — | | 0 | 0 |
| 1899 Hoffenheim II | 2014–15 | Regionalliga Südwest | 17 | 1 | — | | — | | 17 | 1 |
| VfL Bochum (loan) | 2015–16 | 2. Bundesliga | 33 | 3 | 4 | 1 | — | | 37 | 4 |
| SC Freiburg | 2016–17 | Bundesliga | 32 | 3 | 2 | 1 | — | | 34 | 4 |
| SC Freiburg | 2017–18 | Bundesliga | 33 | 3 | 3 | 1 | 2 | 0 | 34 | 4 |
| SC Freiburg | 2018–19 | Bundesliga | 27 | 1 | 1 | 0 | — | | 28 | 1 |
| SC Freiburg | 2019–20 | Bundesliga | 26 | 2 | 1 | 0 | — | | 27 | 2 |
| SC Freiburg | 2020–21 | Bundesliga | 14 | 0 | 0 | 0 | — | | 14 | 0 |
| SC Freiburg | 2021–22 | Bundesliga | 26 | 3 | 4 | 0 | — | | 30 | 3 |
| SC Freiburg | Total | | 158 | 12 | 11 | 2 | 2 | 0 | 167 | 14 |
| SC Freiburg II | 2019–20 | Regionalliga Südwest | 1 | 0 | 0 | 0 | — | | 1 | 0 |
| Union Berlin | 2022–23 | Bundesliga | 32 | 5 | 4 | 0 | 9 | 0 | 45 | 5 |
| Union Berlin | 2023–24 | Bundesliga | 21 | 1 | 1 | 1 | 5 | 0 | 27 | 2 |
| Union Berlin | 2024–25 | Bundesliga | 28 | 0 | 2 | 0 | — | | 30 | 0 |
| Union Berlin | 2025–26 | Bundesliga | 27 | 0 | 2 | 0 | — | | 29 | 0 |
| Union Berlin | 2026–27 | Bundesliga | 8 | 3 | 1 | 0 | — | | 9 | 3 |
| Union Berlin | Total | | 116 | 8 | 10 | 1 | 14 | 0 | 140 | 9 |
| Career total | | | 385 | 35 | 25 | 4 | 16 | 0 | 422 | 39 |

== Honours ==
Germany U21

- UEFA European Under-21 Championship: 2017
