= Derrick Köhn =

Ghanaian footballer

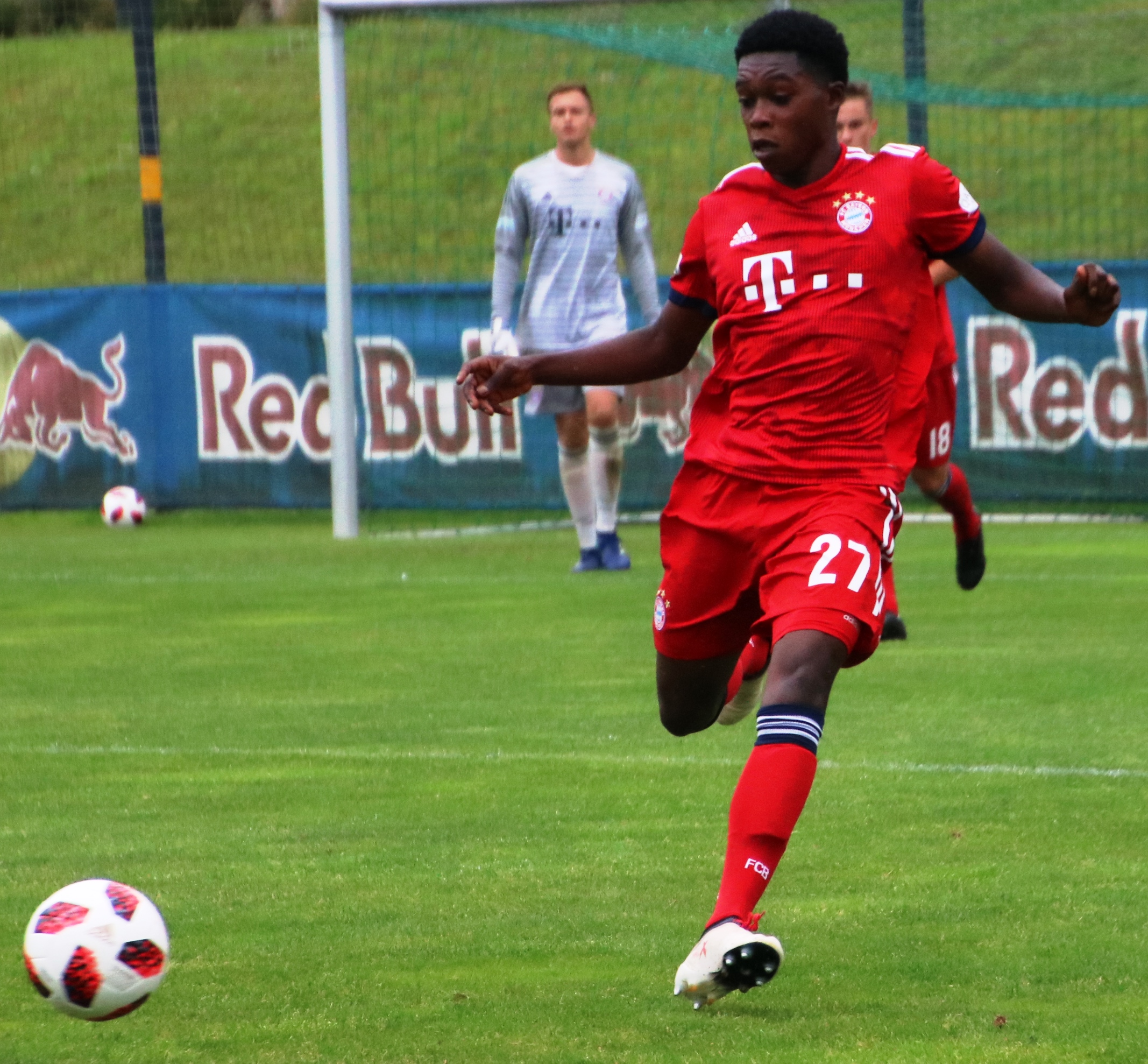
- Köhn in 2018

Personal information
- Full name: Derrick Arthur Köhn
- Date of birth: 4 February 1999 (age 27)
- Place of birth: Hamburg, Germany
- Height: 1.80 m (5 ft 11 in)
- Position: Left-back

Team information
- Current team: Union Berlin
- Number: 17

Youth career
- –2013: Bramfelder SV
- 2013–2017: Hamburger SV
- 2017: Bayern Munich

Senior career*
Years	Team	Apps	(Gls)
2017–2020	Bayern Munich II	78	(3)
2020–2022	Willem II	62	(1)
2022–2024	Hannover 96	53	(8)
2024–2025	Galatasaray	14	(1)
2024–2025	→ Werder Bremen (loan)	27	(2)
2025–	Union Berlin	32	(2)

International career^{‡}
2017	Germany U19	1	(0)
2025–	Ghana	3	(0)
- * Club domestic league appearances and goals as of 1 November 2026 ‡ National team caps and goals as of 30 March 2026

Derrick Arthur Köhn (born 4 February 1999) is a professional footballer who plays as a left-back for Bundesliga club Union Berlin. Born in Germany, he plays for the Ghana national team.

== Club career ==
=== Galatasaray ===
On 8 February 2024, Köhn signed a three-year contract with Galatasaray.

On 8 March 2024, Köhn scored his first goal for Galatasaray in a 6–2 win over Çaykur Rizespor during the 29th matchweek of the Süper Lig.

==== Werder Bremen (loan) ====
On 30 August 2024, Köhn moved to Werder Bremen on loan until the end of the 2024–25 season. Galatasaray announced a €400,000 loan fee and an option for Werder Bremen to sign Köhn permanently for €5.125 million.

=== Union Berlin ===
On 19 August 2025, Galatasaray announced that Köhn was transferred to the German team Union Berlin for €4 million.

== International career ==
Born in Germany, Köhn is of Ghanaian descent. He is a youth international for Germany. He was called up to the Ghana national team for a set of friendly matches in November 2025.

== Career statistics ==
=== Club ===
As of match played 1 November 2026

Appearances and goals by club, season and competition
Club	Season	League			Cup		Continental		Other		Total	
Club	Season	Division	Apps	Goals	Apps	Goals	Apps	Goals	Apps	Goals	Apps	Goals
Bayern Munich II	2017–18	Regionalliga Bayern	32	2	–		–		–		32	2
Bayern Munich II	2018–19	Regionalliga Bayern	30	0	–		–		–		30	0
Bayern Munich II	2019–20	3. Liga	16	1	–		–		–		16	1
Bayern Munich II	Total		78	3	0	0	0	0	0	0	78	3
Willem II	2020–21	Eredivisie	31	0	0	0	1	0	–		32	0
Willem II	2021–22	Eredivisie	31	1	1	0	–		–		32	1
Willem II	Total		62	1	1	0	1	0	0	0	64	1
Hannover 96	2022–23	2. Bundesliga	33	5	2	0	–		–		35	5
Hannover 96	2023–24	2. Bundesliga	20	3	1	0	–		–		21	3
Hannover 96	Total		53	8	3	0	–		–		56	8
Galatasaray	2023–24	Süper Lig	13	1	1	0	0	0	1 (Note: Appearance in Turkish Super Cup)	0	15	1
Galatasaray	2024–25	Süper Lig	1	0	0	0	2 (Note: Appearances in UEFA Champions League)	0	1	0	4	0
Galatasaray	Total		14	1	1	0	2	0	2	0	19	1
Werder Bremen (loan)	2024–25	Bundesliga	27	1	3	0	–		–		30	1
Union Berlin	2025–26	Bundesliga	29	1	0	0	–		–		29	1
Union Berlin	2026–27	Bundesliga	3	0	1	0	–		–		4	0
Union Berlin	Total		32	1	1	0	–		–		33	1
Career total			266	15	9	0	3	0	2	0	280	15

=== International ===
As of match played 30 March 2026

Appearances and goals by national team and year
National team	Year	Apps	Goals
Ghana	2025	1	0
Ghana	2026	2	0
Total		3	0

== Honours ==
Galatasaray

- Süper Lig: 2023–24
- Turkish Super Cup: 2023
