= 2024–25 1. FC Union Berlin season =

1. FC Union Berlin
2024–25 season
- President: Dirk Zingler
- Head coach: Bo Svensson (until 27 December); Steffen Baumgart (from 30 December)
- Stadium: Stadion An der Alten Försterei
- Bundesliga: 13th
- DFB-Pokal: Second round
- Top goalscorer: League: Benedict Hollerbach (9); All: Benedict Hollerbach (9)
Home colours	Away colours	Third colours

The 2024–25 season was the 119th season in the history of 1. FC Union Berlin, and the club's sixth consecutive season in the Bundesliga. In addition to the domestic league, the club participated in the DFB-Pokal.

== Transfers ==
=== In ===
Pos.	Player	Transferred from	Fee	Date	Source
MF	(Germany) Tim Skarke	(Germany) Darmstadt 98	Loan return	30 June 2024	
DF	(Poland) Tymoteusz Puchacz	(Germany) 1. FC Kaiserslautern	Loan return	30 June 2024	
FW	(Croatia) Ivan Prtajin	(Germany) Wehen Wiesbaden	€1,000,000	1 July 2024	
DF	(Austria) Leopold Querfeld	(Austria) Rapid Wien	€2,500,000	1 July 2024	
MF	(Slovakia) László Bénes	(Germany) Hamburger SV	€6,000,000	1 July 2024	
MF	(Turkey) Livan Burcu	(Germany) SV Sandhausen	Undisclosed	20 July 2024	
GK	(Germany) Carl Klaus	(Germany) 1. FC Nürnberg	Free	28 July 2024	
DF	(Germany) Tom Rothe	(Germany) Borussia Dortmund	€5,000,000	7 August 2024	
MF	(South Korea) Jeong Woo-yeong	(Germany) VfB Stuttgart	Loan	27 August 2024	

=== Out ===
Pos.	Player	Transferred to	Fee	Date	Source
MF	(Germany) Jamie Leweling	(Germany) VfB Stuttgart	€5,000,000	1 July 2024	
MF	(Norway) Morten Thorsby	(Italy) Genoa	€4,000,000	1 July 2024	
DF	(Germany) Robin Knoche	(Germany) 1. FC Nürnberg	End of contract	1 July 2024	
GK	(Denmark) Jakob Busk	(Denmark) Sønderjyske	End of contract	1 July 2024	
MF	(United States) Brenden Aaronson	(England) Leeds United	Loan return	1 July 2024	
GK	(Germany) Lennart Grill	(Germany) Eintracht Braunschweig	Loan	4 July 2024	
MF	(Japan) Keita Endo	(Japan) FC Tokyo		8 July 2024	
MF	(Tunisia) Aïssa Laïdouni	(Qatar) Al-Wakrah	Undisclosed	12 July 2024	
MF	(Turkey) Livan Burcu	(Germany) 1. FC Magdeburg	Loan	20 July 2024	
DF	(Poland) Tymoteusz Puchacz	(Germany) Holstein Kiel	Undisclosed	2 August 2024	
MF	(Czech Republic) Alex Král	(Spain) Espanyol	Loan	7 August 2024	
FW	(Germany) Levis Asanji	(Italy) Milan Futuro	Undisclosed	3 February 2025	

== Friendlies ==
The team began training on 1 July. Additionally, the team scheduled a week-long training retreat in the town of Längenfeld, Austria from 13 to 19 July.

6 July 2024 Friendly	Chemie Leipzig	0–4	Union Berlin	Leipzig
15:30 CEST (UTC+2)		Report	Khedira 32'; Vertessen 37'; Hollerbach 49'; Prtajin 77'	Stadium: Alfred-Kunze-Sportpark; Attendance: 4,999

18 July 2024 Friendly	Dynamo Kyiv	2–3	Union Berlin	Kematen
17:00 CEST (UTC+2)	Vanat 34'; Diallo 83'; Popov (yellow card) 84'	Report	Hollerbach (penalty missed) 14', 14'; Bedia 68'; Pefok 90+1'	Stadium: Sportplatz Kematen; Attendance: 648

27 July 2024 Friendly	Union Berlin	4–4	Rangers	Berlin
17:00 CEST (UTC+2)	Haberer 5', 41'; Pefok 21' (pen.); Preu 60'	Report	Dessers 14', 69'; Lawrence 32', 38'	Stadium: Stadion An der Alten Försterei; Attendance: 21,108; Referee: Florian Lechner (Germany)

3 August 2024 Friendly	Union Berlin	0–4	Lyon	Berlin
17:00 CEST (UTC+2)		Report	Maitland-Niles 49'; Benrahma 65'; Orban 75', 85'	Stadium: Stadion An der Alten Försterei; Attendance: 12,317

9 August 2024 Friendly	Union Berlin	1–1	Real Sociedad	Berlin
19:00 CEST (UTC+2)	Tousart (yellow card) 39'; Gosens 42'	Report	González de Zárate (yellow card) 35'; Oyarzabal 82'	Stadium: Stadion An der Alten Försterei; Attendance: 19,265; Referee: Max Burda (Germany)

5 September 2024 Friendly	Union Berlin	2–2	Eintracht Braunschweig
14:00

5 January 2025 Friendly	Union Berlin	1–2	Holstein Kiel
13:00
Note: 4 x 30

== Competitions ==
=== Overall record ===
Competition	First match	Last match	Starting round	Final position	Record							
Competition	First match	Last match	Starting round	Final position	Pld	W	D	L	GF	GA	GD	Win %
Bundesliga	24 August 2024	17 May 2025	Matchday 1	13th	34	10	10	14	35	51	−16	29.41
DFB-Pokal	17 August 2024	30 October 2024	First round	Second round	2	1	0	1	1	2	−1	50.00
Total					36	11	10	15	36	53	−17	30.56

Source: Soccerway

=== Bundesliga ===
==== League table ====
Pos	Team	Pld	W	D	L	GF	GA	GD	Pts
11	VfL Wolfsburg	34	11	10	13	56	54	+2	43
12	FC Augsburg	34	11	10	13	35	51	−16	43
13	Union Berlin	34	10	10	14	35	51	−16	40
14	FC St. Pauli	34	8	8	18	28	41	−13	32
15	TSG Hoffenheim	34	7	11	16	46	68	−22	32

Source: Bundesliga
Rules for classification: 1) Points; 2) Goal difference; 3) Goals scored; 4) Head-to-head results; 5) Head-to-head away goals scored; 6) Away goals scored; 7) Play-off.
(Rules 4–6 only apply after home and away matches have been played between the tied teams.)

==== Results summary ====
Overall								Home						Away					
Pld	W	D	L	GF	GA	GD	Pts	W	D	L	GF	GA	GD	W	D	L	GF	GA	GD
34	10	10	14	35	51	−16	40	5	6	6	18	23	−5	5	4	8	17	28	−11

Source: DFB

==== Results by round ====
Round	1	2	3	4	5	6	7	8	9	10	11	12	13	14	15	16	17	18	19	20	21	22	23	24	25	26	27	28	29	30	31	32	33	34
Ground	A	H	A	H	A	H	A	H	A	H	A	H	A	H	A	H	A	H	A	H	A	H	A	H	A	H	A	H	A	H	A	H	A	H
Result	D	W	D	W	L	W	W	D	L	D	L	L	L	L	L	W	W	W	L	D	L	L	L	L	W	D	W	W	D	D	D	D	L	L
Position	10	5	9	6	9	6	5	4	7	6	10	11	12	12	12	12	12	13	13	14	14	13	13	13	14	14	13	13	13	13	13	13	13	13

Source: DFB
A = Away; H = Home; W = Win; D = Draw; L = Loss

==== Matches ====
The league schedule was released on 4 July 2024.

24 August 2024 1	Mainz 05	1–1	Union Berlin	Mainz
15:30	Kohr (yellow card) 7'; Amiri 53'	Report	Tousart (yellow card) 45+3'; Doekhi (yellow card) 52'; Bénes 74'; Gosens (yellow card) 90+8'	Stadium: Mewa Arena; Attendance: 31,500; Referee: Harm Osmers

30 August 2024 2	Union Berlin	1–0	FC St. Pauli	Berlin
20:30	Hollerbach 34', (yellow card) 76'; Querfeld (yellow card) 90+1'; Jeong (yellow card) 90+4'	Report	Guilavogui (yellow card) 45+1'	Stadium: Stadion An der Alten Försterei; Attendance: 22,012; Referee: Bastian Dankert

14 September 2024 3	RB Leipzig	0–0	Union Berlin	Leipzig
15:30	Haidara (yellow card) 53'; Kampl (yellow card) 74'	Report	Bénes (yellow card) 26'; Khedira (yellow card) 61'; Doekhi (yellow card) 85'	Stadium: Red Bull Arena; Attendance: 47,800; Referee: Sven Jablonski

21 September 2024 4	Union Berlin	2–1	TSG Hoffenheim	Berlin
15:30	Rothe 4', (yellow card) 71'; Jeong 6'; Pefok (yellow card) 23'; Vertessen (yellow card) 85'	Report	Kadeřábek (yellow card) 50'; Bülter 67'; Bischof (yellow card) 79'; Tohumcu (yellow card) 89'	Stadium: Stadion An der Alten Försterei; Attendance: 21,831; Referee: Matthias Jöllenbeck

28 September 2024 5	Borussia Mönchengladbach	1–0	Union Berlin	Mönchengladbach
15:30	Stöger (yellow card) 67'; Scally (yellow card) 69'; Pléa (yellow card) 81'; Čvančara 90+6'	Report	Querfeld (yellow card) 55'	Stadium: Borussia-Park; Attendance: 53,056; Referee: Daniel Schlager

5 October 2024 6	Union Berlin	2–1	Borussia Dortmund	Berlin
15:30	Vogt (yellow card) 15', (goal) 26' (pen.); Jeong (yellow card) 41'; Vertessen 45'; Rothe (yellow card) 84'; Trimmel (yellow card) 89'	Report	Schlotterbeck (yellow card) 17'; Ryerson 62'; Sabitzer (yellow card) 83'; Anton (yellow card) 90+4'; Bensebaini (yellow card) 90+6'	Stadium: Stadion An der Alten Försterei; Attendance: 22,000; Referee: Tobias Reichel

20 October 2024 7	Holstein Kiel	0–2	Union Berlin	Kiel
15:30	Komenda (yellow card) 66'; Remberg (yellow card) 79'	Report	Kemlein 18'; Rönnow (yellow card) 73'; Rothe 89'	Stadium: Holstein-Stadion; Attendance: 15,034; Referee: Timo Gerach

27 October 2024 8	Union Berlin	1–1	Eintracht Frankfurt	Berlin
17:30 CET (UTC+1)	Kemlein (yellow card) 30'; Leite (yellow card) 38'; Hollerbach 66'; Trimmel (yellow card) 84'; Vogt (yellow card) 87'; Schäfer (yellow card) 89'	Report	Gotze 14'; Theate (yellow card) 38'; Tuta (yellow card) 74' (yellow-red card) 77'	Stadium: Stadion An der Alten Försterei; Attendance: 22,012; Referee: Harm Osmers

2 November 2024 9	Bayern Munich	3–0	Union Berlin	Munich
15:30	Kane 15' (pen.), 51'; Coman 43'	Report	Kemlein (yellow card) 31'; Khedira (yellow card) 84'	Stadium: Allianz Arena; Attendance: 75,000; Referee: Matthias Jöllenbeck

8 November 2024 10	Union Berlin	0–0	SC Freiburg	Berlin
20:30 CET (UTC+1)	Khedira (yellow card) 19'; Keyhanfar (yellow card) 23'; Vogt (yellow card) 56'	Report		Stadium: Stadion An der Alten Försterei; Attendance: 22,012; Referee: Tobias Reichel

23 November 2024 11	VfL Wolfsburg	1–0	Union Berlin	Wolfsburg
15:30	Wimmer (yellow card) 15'; R.Baku 71'	Report	Vogt (yellow card) 45+1'; Bénes (yellow card) 90+2'	Stadium: Volkswagen Arena; Attendance: 23,861; Referee: Tobias Stieler

30 November 2024 12	Union Berlin	1–2	Bayer Leverkusen	Berlin
15:30 CET (UTC+1)	Rothe (yellow card) 28'; Jeong 29'; Querfeld (yellow card) 63'; Trimmel (yellow card) 67'; Skov (yellow card) 90+3'	Report	Frimpong 2'; Andrich (yellow card) 21'; Schick 71'; Mukiele (yellow card) 90+4'	Stadium: Stadion An der Alten Försterei; Attendance: 22,012; Referee: Christian Dingert

7 December 2024 13	VfB Stuttgart	3–2	Union Berlin	Stuttgart
20:30 CET (UTC+1)	Mittelstädt (yellow card) 34'; Woltemade 51', 59'; Karazor 69'	Report	Doekhi 37', (yellow card) 90+5'; Rönnow (yellow card) 45+3'; Skov 48'; Skarke (yellow card) 60'; Leite (yellow card) 90+5'; Vertessen (yellow card) 90+5'; Khedira (yellow card) 90+5'	Stadium: MHPArena; Attendance: 59,000; Referee: Tobias Welz

14 December 2024 14	Union Berlin	1–1	VfL Bochum	Berlin
20:30	Hollerbach 37', (yellow card) 37'; Vogt (yellow card) 67'	Report	Miyoshi (red card) 13'; Sissoko 23'; Broschinski (yellow card) 50'; Drewes (yellow card) 90+1'	Stadium: Stadion An der Alten Försterei; Attendance: 22,012; Referee: Martin Petersen

21 December 2024 15	Werder Bremen	4–1	Union Berlin	Bremen

11 January 2025 16	1. FC Heidenheim	2–0	Union Berlin	Heidenheim

15 January 2025 17	Union Berlin	0–2	FC Augsburg	Berlin

19 January 2025 18	Union Berlin	2–1	Mainz 05	Berlin

26 January 2025 19	FC St. Pauli	3–0	Union Berlin	Hamburg

1 February 2025 20	Union Berlin	0–0	RB Leipzig	Berlin

8 February 2025 21	TSG Hoffenheim	0–4	Union Berlin	Sinsheim

15 February 2025 22	Union Berlin	1–2	Borussia Mönchengladbach	Berlin

22 February 2025 23	Borussia Dortmund	6–0	Union Berlin	Dortmund

2 March 2025 24	Union Berlin	0–1	Holstein Kiel	Berlin

9 March 2025 25	Eintracht Frankfurt	1–2	Union Berlin	Frankfurt

15 March 2025 26	Union Berlin	1–1	Bayern Munich	Berlin

30 March 2025 27	SC Freiburg	1–2	Union Berlin	Freiburg

6 April 2025 28	Union Berlin	1–0	VfL Wolfsburg	Berlin

12 April 2025 29	Bayer Leverkusen	0–0	Union Berlin	Leverkusen

19 April 2025 30	Union Berlin	4–4	VfB Stuttgart	Berlin

27 April 2025 31	VfL Bochum	1–1	Union Berlin	Bochum

3 May 2025 32	Union Berlin	2–2	Werder Bremen	Berlin

10 May 2025 33	Union Berlin	0–3	1. FC Heidenheim	Berlin

17 May 2025 34	FC Augsburg	1–2	Union Berlin	Augsburg

=== DFB-Pokal ===
17 August 2024 First round	Greifswalder FC	0–1	Union Berlin	Greifswald
15:30 CEST (UTC+2)		Report	Vertessen 67'	Stadium: Volksstadion Greifswald; Referee: Lukas Benen

30 October 2024 Second round	Arminia Bielefeld	2–0	Union Berlin	Bielefeld
20:45 CET (UTC+1)	Wörl 12', (yellow card) 79'; Bazee (yellow card) 45+2'; André Becker 71', (yellow card) 81'	Report	Hollerbach (yellow card) 75'	Stadium: SchücoArena; Attendance: 26,117; Referee: Wolfgang Haslberger
