= Andrej Ilić =

Serbian footballer (born 2000)

Andrej Ilić Андреј Илић
Personal information
- Date of birth: 3 April 2000 (age 26)
- Place of birth: Belgrade, Serbia, FR Yugoslavia
- Height: 1.89 m (6 ft 2 in)
- Position: Centre-forward

Team information
- Current team: Union Berlin
- Number: 23

Youth career
- 2008–2018: Partizan

Senior career*
Years	Team	Apps	(Gls)
2018–2020	Napredak Kruševac	29	(3)
2020–2021	Javor Ivanjica	27	(9)
2021–2023	RFS	65	(33)
2023–2024	Vålerenga	15	(9)
2024–2025	Lille	2	(0)
2024–2025	→ Union Berlin (loan)	16	(7)
2025–	Union Berlin	32	(5)

International career^{‡}
2021–2022	Serbia U21	4	(0)
2025–	Serbia	1	(0)
- * Club domestic league appearances and goals as of 16 May 2026 ‡ National team caps and goals as of 12 October 2025

Andrej Ilić (Serbian Cyrillic: Андреј Илић; born 3 April 2000) is a Serbian professional footballer who plays as a centre-forward for Bundesliga club Union Berlin and the Serbia national team.

== Club career ==
On 3 September 2021, he signed a three-year contract with RFS in Latvia. On 22 September he played his first league game for the club, getting 62 minutes of playing time against Liepaja. He scored his first league goal for the Latvian club against city rival Spartaks on 16 October He went on to become the club's top scorer across all competitions in his first full season.

On 16 August 2023, Ilić signed a four-year contract with Norwegian Eliteserien club Vålerenga. The transfer fee was reported to be just under €900.000. He made his league debut three days later in a 0–0 draw against Molde, replacing Mohamed Ofkir after 62 minutes. His first two league goals came against Aalesund on 17 September.

On 1 February 2024, Ilić signed with French side Lille. The transfer fee is believed to have been around €4-5 million, potentially reaching €7 million depending on different clauses. He made his debut for the club on 4 February coming on as a substitute in the last seven minutes in a 4–0 win against Clermont.

On 30 August 2024, Ilić moved to Union Berlin in Germany on loan with an option to buy. He scored 5 goals in the last 12 games of the season.

On 2 June 2025, Ilić was announced at Union Berlin on a permanent transfer.

== Career statistics ==
=== Club ===
As of match played 16 May 2026

Appearances and goals by club, season and competition
Club	Season	League			National cup		Continental		Other		Total	
Club	Season	Division	Apps	Goals	Apps	Goals	Apps	Goals	Apps	Goals	Apps	Goals
Napredak Kruševac	2018–19	Serbian SuperLiga	13	2	1	0	—		—		14	2
Napredak Kruševac	2019–20	Serbian SuperLiga	16	1	1	0	—		—		17	1
Napredak Kruševac	Total		29	3	2	0	—		0	0	31	3
Javor Ivanjica	2020–21	Serbian SuperLiga	27	9	2	0	—		—		29	9
RFS	2021	Virsliga	8	3	2	1	—		—		10	4
RFS	2022	Virsliga	32	16	3	1	12 (Note: Two appearances in UEFA Champions League, ten appearances and four goals in UEFA Europa Conference League)	4	—		47	21
RFS	2023	Virsliga	25	14	0	0	4 (Note: Appearances in UEFA Europa Conference League)	2	—		29	16
RFS	Total		65	33	5	1	16	6	—		86	41
Vålerenga	2023	Eliteserien	15	9	1	2	—		—		16	11
Lille	2023–24	Ligue 1	2	0	1	0	0	0	—		3	0
Lille	2024–25	Ligue 1	0	0	—		1 (Note: Appearance in UEFA Champions League)	0	—		1	0
Lille	Total		2	0	1	0	1	0	—		4	0
Union Berlin (loan)	2024–25	Bundesliga	16	7	0	0	—		—		16	7
Union Berlin	2025–26	Bundesliga	32	5	2	1	—		—		34	6
Career total			186	66	13	5	17	6	0	0	215	77

=== International ===
As of match played 14 October 2025

Appearances and goals by national team and year
National team	Year	Apps	Goals
Serbia	2025	1	0
Total		1	0

== Honours ==
RFS

- Latvian Higher League: 2021
- Latvian Cup: 2021
