= Livan Burcu =

Turkish footballer (born 2004)

Personal information
- Full name: Livan Baha Burcu
- Date of birth: 28 September 2004 (age 22)
- Place of birth: Frankfurt, Germany
- Height: 1.78 m (5 ft 10 in)
- Position: Winger

Team information
- Current team: Union Berlin
- Number: 9

Youth career
- 2010–2014: FSV Frankfurt
- 2014–2022: Eintracht Frankfurt
- 2022: Beşiktaş
- 2022–2023: SV Sandhausen

Senior career*
Years	Team	Apps	(Gls)
2023–2024	SV Sandhausen	28	(4)
2024–	Union Berlin	25	(1)
2024–2025	→ 1. FC Magdeburg (loan)	31	(3)

International career^{‡}
2024–	Turkey U21	7	(1)
- * Club domestic league appearances and goals as of 1 November 2026 ‡ National team caps and goals as of 22:49, 19 November 2024 (UTC)

Livan Baha Burcu (born 28 September 2004) is a professional footballer who plays as a winger for Bundesliga club Union Berlin. Born in Germany, he is a youth international for Turkey.

== Club career ==
Burcu is a youth product of FSV Frankfurt and Eintracht Frankfurt, followed by a short stint with Beşiktaş, before moving to the youth academy of SV Sandhausen in 2022. On 24 April 2023, he signed his first contract with Sandhausen and was promoted to their first team ahead of the 2023–24 season. He made his senior and professional debut with Sandhausen as a substitute in a 0–0 3. Liga tie with VfB Lübeck on 5 August 2023.

On 20 July 2024, Burcu signed for Bundesliga club Union Berlin, joining 1. FC Magdeburg on a season-long loan deal.

== International career ==
Born in Germany, Burcu is of Turkish descent. He is a youth international for Turkey, having played up to the Turkey U21s since 2024.

== Career statistics ==
As of match played 1 November 2026

Appearances and goals by club, season and competition
Club	Season	League			Cup		Europe		Other		Total	
Club	Season	Division	Apps	Goals	Apps	Goals	Apps	Goals	Apps	Goals	Apps	Goals
SV Sandhausen	2023–24	3. Liga	28	4	2	0	—		3 (Note: Appearances in Baden Cup)	2	33	6
Union Berlin	2024–25	Bundesliga	0	0	0	0	—		—		0	0
Union Berlin	2025–26	Bundesliga	18	1	1	0	—		—		19	1
Union Berlin	2026–27	Bundesliga	7	0	2	0	—		—		9	0
Union Berlin	Total		24	1	3	0	—		—		28	1
1. FC Magdeburg (loan)	2024–25	2. Bundesliga	31	3	1	0	—		—		32	3
Career total			84	8	6	0	0	0	3	2	93	10
