= Alex Král =

Czech footballer (born 1998)

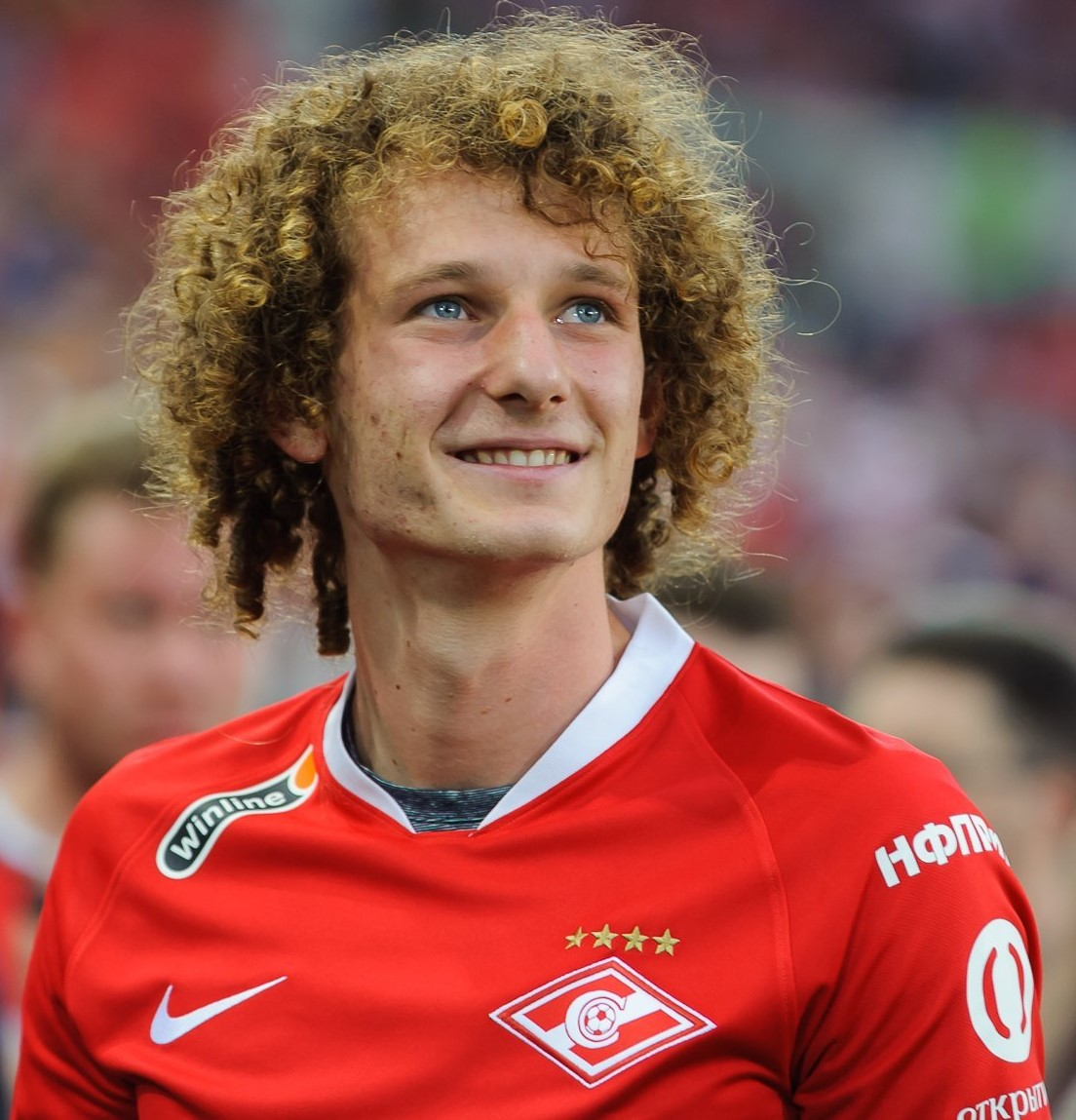
- Král with Spartak Moscow in 2019

Personal information
- Full name: Alex Král
- Date of birth: 19 May 1998 (age 28)
- Place of birth: Košice, Slovakia
- Height: 1.87 m (6 ft 2 in)
- Position: Defensive midfielder

Team information
- Current team: Copenhagen
- Number: 33

Youth career
- 2004–2007: Moravská Slavia Brno
- 2007–2012: Zbrojovka Brno
- 2012–2017: Slavia Prague

Senior career*
Years	Team	Apps	(Gls)
2017–2019	Teplice	43	(1)
2019	Slavia Prague	18	(0)
2019–2023	Spartak Moscow	53	(0)
2021–2022	→ West Ham United (loan)	1	(0)
2022–2023	→ Schalke 04 (loan)	29	(0)
2023–2026	Union Berlin	44	(0)
2024–2025	→ Espanyol (loan)	37	(0)
2026–	Copenhagen	12	(1)

International career^{‡}
2014–2015	Czech Republic U17	18	(1)
2015–2016	Czech Republic U18	13	(1)
2016–2017	Czech Republic U19	20	(1)
2017	Czech Republic U20	3	(0)
2017–2018	Czech Republic U21	9	(1)
2019–	Czech Republic	54	(2)
- * Club domestic league appearances and goals as of 26 October 2026 ‡ National team caps and goals as of 15 November 2026

Alex Král (born 19 May 1998) is a professional footballer who plays as a defensive midfielder for Danish Superliga club Copenhagen. Born in Slovakia, he plays for the Czech Republic national team.

== Early life ==
Born in Slovakia, Král's family moved to Štýřice, Brno in the Czech Republic, when he was a child. He began playing football at SK Moravská Slavia Brno aged six, before joining Zbrojovka Brno aged nine. At 14, he was scouted and recruited by Slavia Prague moving to Prague to continue his development.

== Club career ==
=== Slavia Prague ===
In January 2019, he signed a four-year contract with Slavia Prague.

=== Spartak Moscow ===
On 1 September 2019, he signed a five-year contract with the Russian Premier League club Spartak Moscow. He has since played for the club for several seasons, which included participation in the UEFA Champions League.

==== Loan to West Ham United ====
On 31 August 2021, Král joined English side West Ham United on a season-long loan with an option to make the deal permanent. He made his debut on 22 September in a 1–0 win against Manchester United in the EFL Cup at Old Trafford. His league debut followed when he came on as a substitute in a 4–1 win at Watford on 28 December 2021. Král made one appearance in the Premier League, three times in the Europa League and once in the FA Cup and the EFL Cup before his loan ended.

==== Contract suspension and Schalke 04 ====
On 1 July 2022, Spartak announced that Král suspended his contract with Spartak Moscow for the 2022–23 season using FIFA's special regulations related to the international response and other fallout from the Russian invasion of Ukraine. On 14 July 2022, Schalke 04 announced the signing of Král to a one-year contract, and under FIFA regulations he remained a Spartak player temporarily playing for Schalke 04.

=== Union Berlin ===
On 2 June 2023, Union Berlin announced the signing of Král ahead of the new season. In his first season at the club, Král made 24 appearances in the Bundesliga, two appearances in the DFB-Pokal, and a further six appearances in Union Berlin's maiden campaign in the Champions League.

==== Loan to Espanyol ====
On 7 August 2024, Král was loaned out to newly promoted La Liga side Espanyol.

=== Copenhagen ===
On 16 July 2026, Král signed a contract with Danish Superliga club Copenhagen as a free agent.

== International career ==
Král made his debut for the Czech Republic national team on 26 March 2019 in a friendly against Brazil, as a 69th-minute substitute for David Pavelka.

== Career statistics ==
=== Club ===
As of match played 29 October 2026

Appearances and goals by club, season and competition
Club	Season	League			National cup (Note: Includes Czech Cup, Russian Cup, FA Cup, DFB-Pokal, Copa del Rey)		Europe		Other		Total	
Club	Season	Division	Apps	Goals	Apps	Goals	Apps	Goals	Apps	Goals	Apps	Goals
Teplice	2016–17	Czech First League	3	0	0	0	—		—		3	0
Teplice	2017–18	Czech First League	23	1	3	1	—		—		26	2
Teplice	2018–19	Czech First League	17	0	2	0	—		—		19	0
Teplice	Total		43	1	5	1	—		—		48	2
Slavia Prague	2018–19	Czech First League	12	0	3	0	6 (Note: Appearances in UEFA Europa League)	1	—		21	1
Slavia Prague	2019–20	Czech First League	6	0	—		2 (Note: Appearances in UEFA Champions League)	0	1 (Note: Appearance in Czechoslovak Supercup)	0	9	0
Slavia Prague	Total		18	0	3	0	8	1	1	0	30	1
Spartak Moscow	2019–20	Russian Premier League	19	0	4	0	—		—		23	0
Spartak Moscow	2020–21	Russian Premier League	29	0	1	0	—		—		30	0
Spartak Moscow	2021–22	Russian Premier League	5	0	0	0	2	0	—		7	0
Spartak Moscow	Total		53	0	5	0	2	0	—		60	0
West Ham United (loan)	2021–22	Premier League	1	0	1	0	3	0	1 (Note: Appearance in EFL Cup)	0	6	0
Schalke 04 (loan)	2022–23	Bundesliga	29	0	2	0	—		—		31	0
Union Berlin	2023–24	Bundesliga	24	0	2	0	6	1	—		32	1
Union Berlin	2025–26	Bundesliga	20	0	1	0	—		—		21	0
Union Berlin	Total		44	0	3	0	6	1	—		53	1
Espanyol (loan)	2024–25	La Liga	37	0	2	0	—		—		39	0
Copenhagen	2026–27	Danish Superliga	12	1	2	0	7 (Note: Appearances in UEFA Conference League)	1	0	0	21	2
Career total			237	2	23	1	26	3	2	0	288	6

=== International ===
As of match played 15 November 2026

Appearances and goals by national team and year
National team	Year	Apps	Goals
Czech Republic	2019	9	2
Czech Republic	2020	7	0
Czech Republic	2021	13	0
Czech Republic	2022	5	0
Czech Republic	2023	5	0
Czech Republic	2024	4	0
Czech Republic	2025	5	0
Czech Republic	2026	6	0
Total		54	2

Scores and results list the Czech Republic's goal tally first.

List of international goals scored by Alex Král
No.	Date	Venue	Opponent	Score	Result	Competition
1.	14 October 2019	Generali Arena, Prague, Czech Republic	Northern Ireland	2–3	2–3	Friendly
2.	14 November 2019	Doosan Arena, Plzeň, Czech Republic	Kosovo	1–1	2–1	UEFA Euro 2020 qualification

== Honours ==
Slavia Prague

- Czech First League: 2018–19
- Czech Cup: 2018–19

Individual

- UEFA European Under-19 Championship Team of the Tournament: 2017
