= Sport in Berlin =

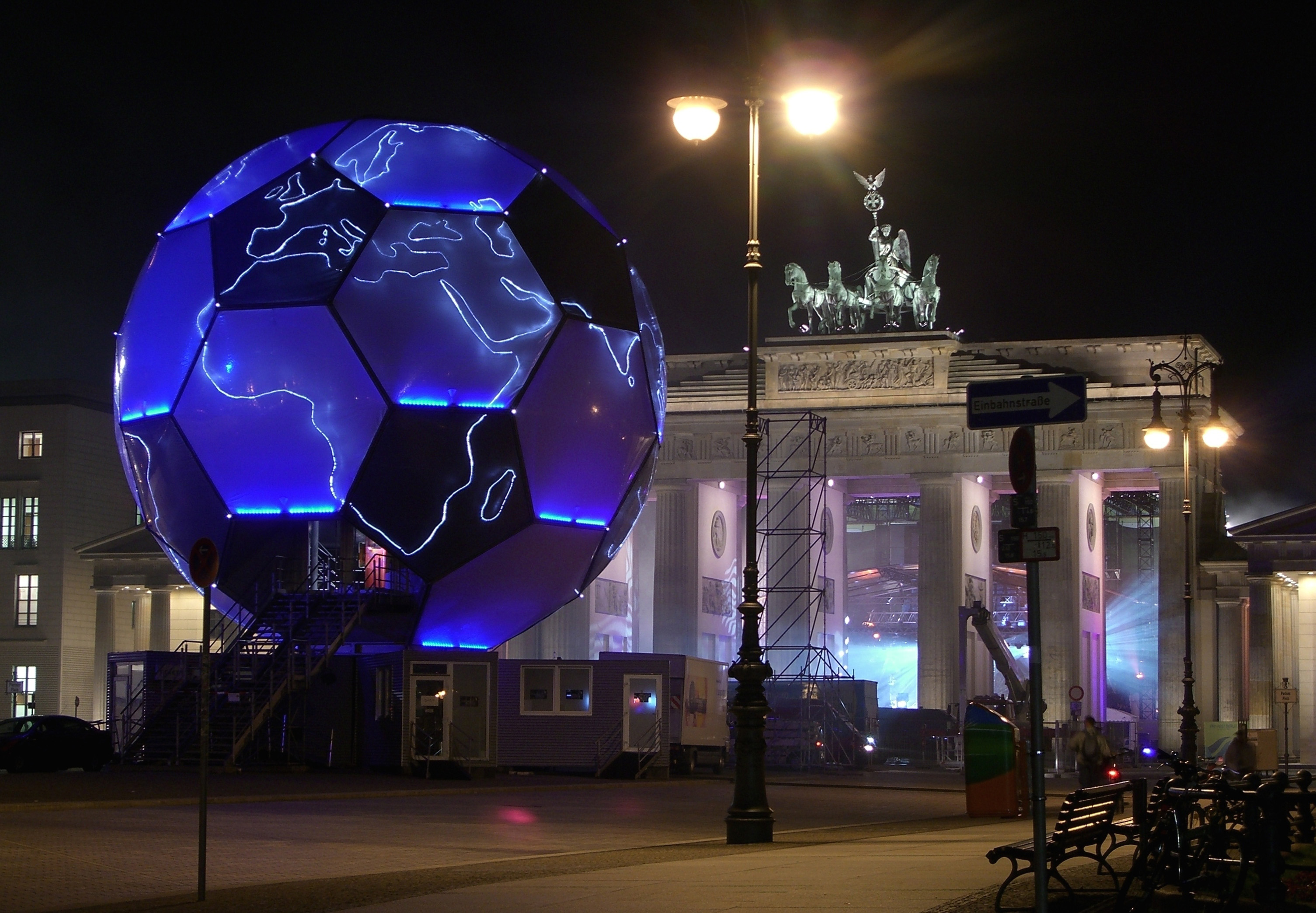
The 2006 FIFA World Cup Final was held in Berlin.

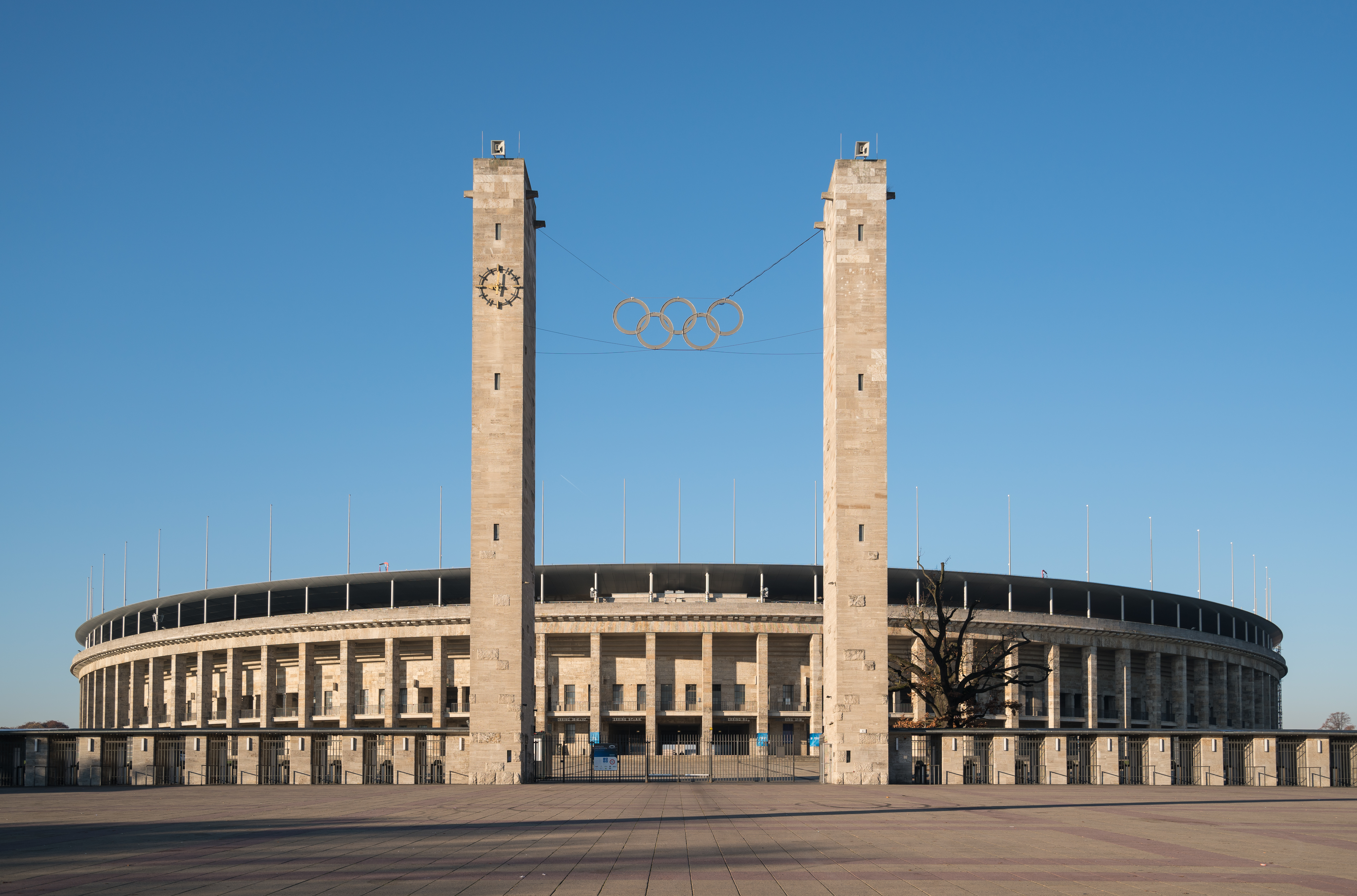
Exterior of Olympiastadion in 2011

Berlin is a major sporting centre in Germany and Europe. In 2013 around 600.000 Berliners were registered in more than 2.300 amateur sports- and fitness clubs.

Berlin has established a high-profile reputation as a host city of international sporting events. The city was host to the 1936 Summer Olympics, the 2006 FIFA World Cup Final and is the venue for several professional sports clubs in Germany's top leagues.

The largest Olympic training centre in Germany is the Sportforum Hohenschönhausen, at 55 hectares one the largest sports and training centres in Europe. It is home to 19 sports clubs, a school and competitive sports centre, as well as a dormitory for athletes in training.

== History ==
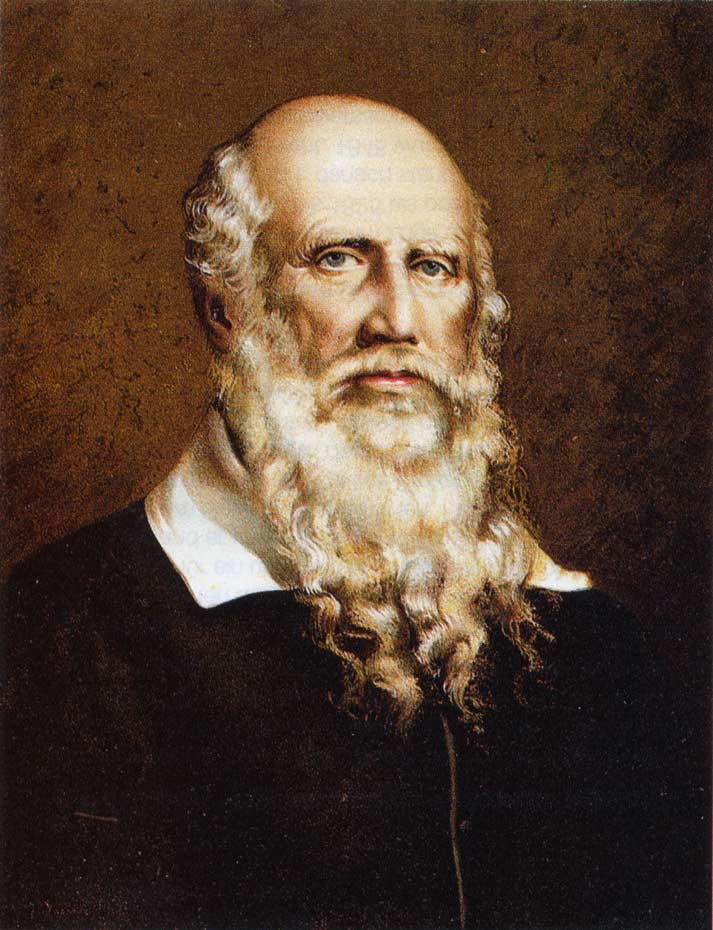
Friedrich Ludwig Jahn

Friedrich Ludwig Jahn known as Turnvater Jahn ( father of gymnastics) was born in 1778 and worked as an assistant teacher in Berlin. At Berlin's Hasenheide Friedrich Ludwig Jahn opened the first German gymnastics field ('Turnplatz'), or open-air gymnasium, in spring 1811. His activities were particularly pointed at the youth, with whom he went to the gym field in free afternoons. The German gymnastics, understood by Jahn as a whole of the physical exercises.

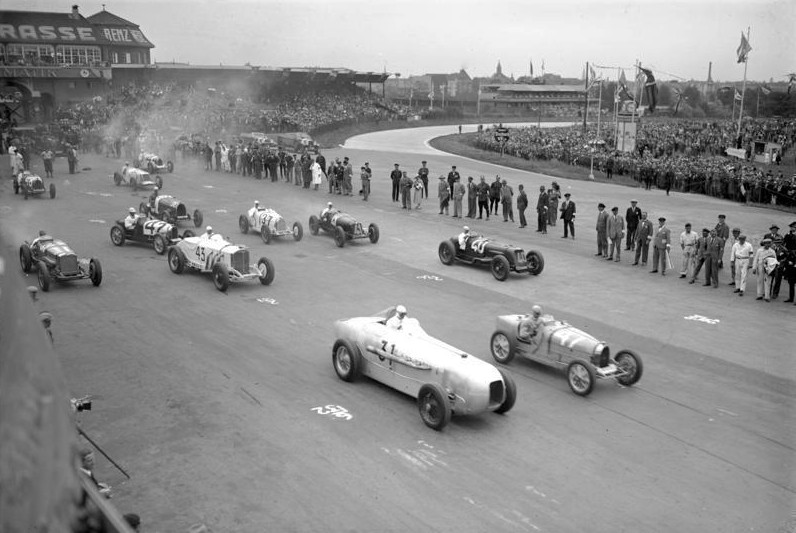
AVUS Road Race in 1932

Jahn developed well-known gymnastic equipment, invented also new apparatuses. Particularly by his main writing "Die Deutsche Turnkunst" (1816) the apparatus gymnastics developed to an independent kind of sport, and so the gym activities were not only limited to simple physical exercises, which he quoted as following: "Going, running, jumping, throwing, carrying are free exercises, everywhere applicable, as free as fresh air."

With the national gymnastics festivals in Coburg in 1860, in Berlin in 1861 and in Leipzig in 1863, the memory of Jahn's ideas returned into the people's consciousness. The inscription at the gable of his house "Frisch, Frei, Fröhlich, Fromm", translated as 'fresh, free, happy, good", which originated in Jahn's time, became the basic idea of the German gymnastics movement.

The FIVB World Tour has chosen an inner-city site to present a beach volleyball Grand Slam several times after 2000.

== Football ==
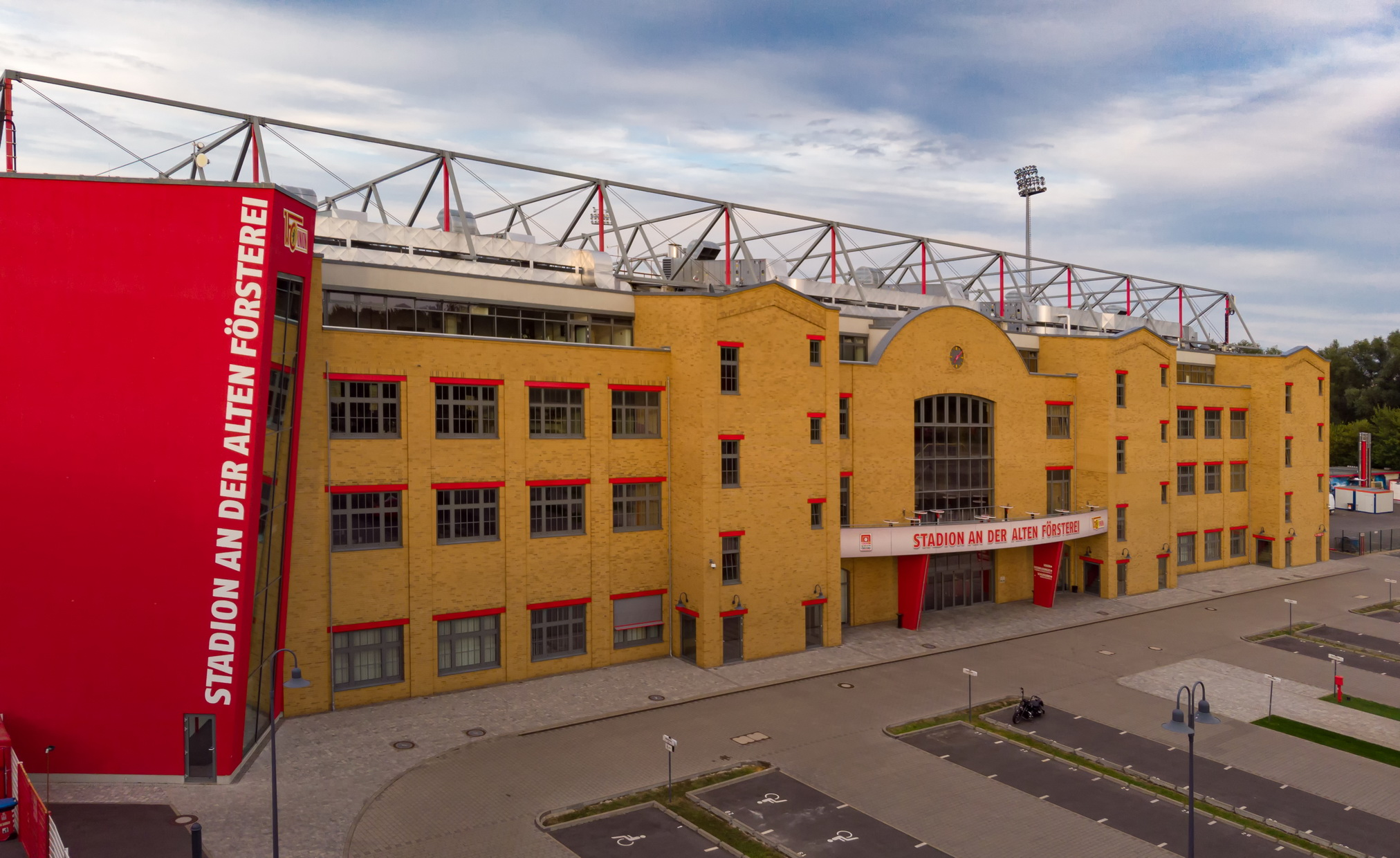
Exterior of Stadion An der Alten Försterei

The two main football clubs in Berlin are Hertha BSC and 1. FC Union Berlin. The oldest and most popular first division team in Berlin is Hertha BSC. Hertha BSC represented Berlin as a founding member of the Bundesliga in 1963. 1. FC Union Berlin was founded in East Berlin in 1966.

The 2006 FIFA World Cup Final was held at the Olympic stadium in Berlin, which is also the home stadium of Hertha BSC. The DFB Cup Final has been held every year at the Olympiastadion since 1985. The largest single-purpose football stadium in the German capital Stadion An der Alten Försterei, which is the home stadium of 1. FC Union Berlin.

Club	Sport	Founded	League	Venue
1. FC Union Berlin	Football	1966	Bundesliga	Stadion An der Alten Försterei
Hertha BSC	Football	1892	2. Bundesliga	Olympiastadion
BFC Dynamo	Football	1966	Regionalliga Nordost	Stadion im Sportforum
FC Viktoria 1889 Berlin	Football	1889	Regionalliga Nordost	Stadion Lichterfelde
VSG Altglienicke	Football	1946	Regionalliga Nordost	Hans-Zoschke-Stadion

== Basketball ==
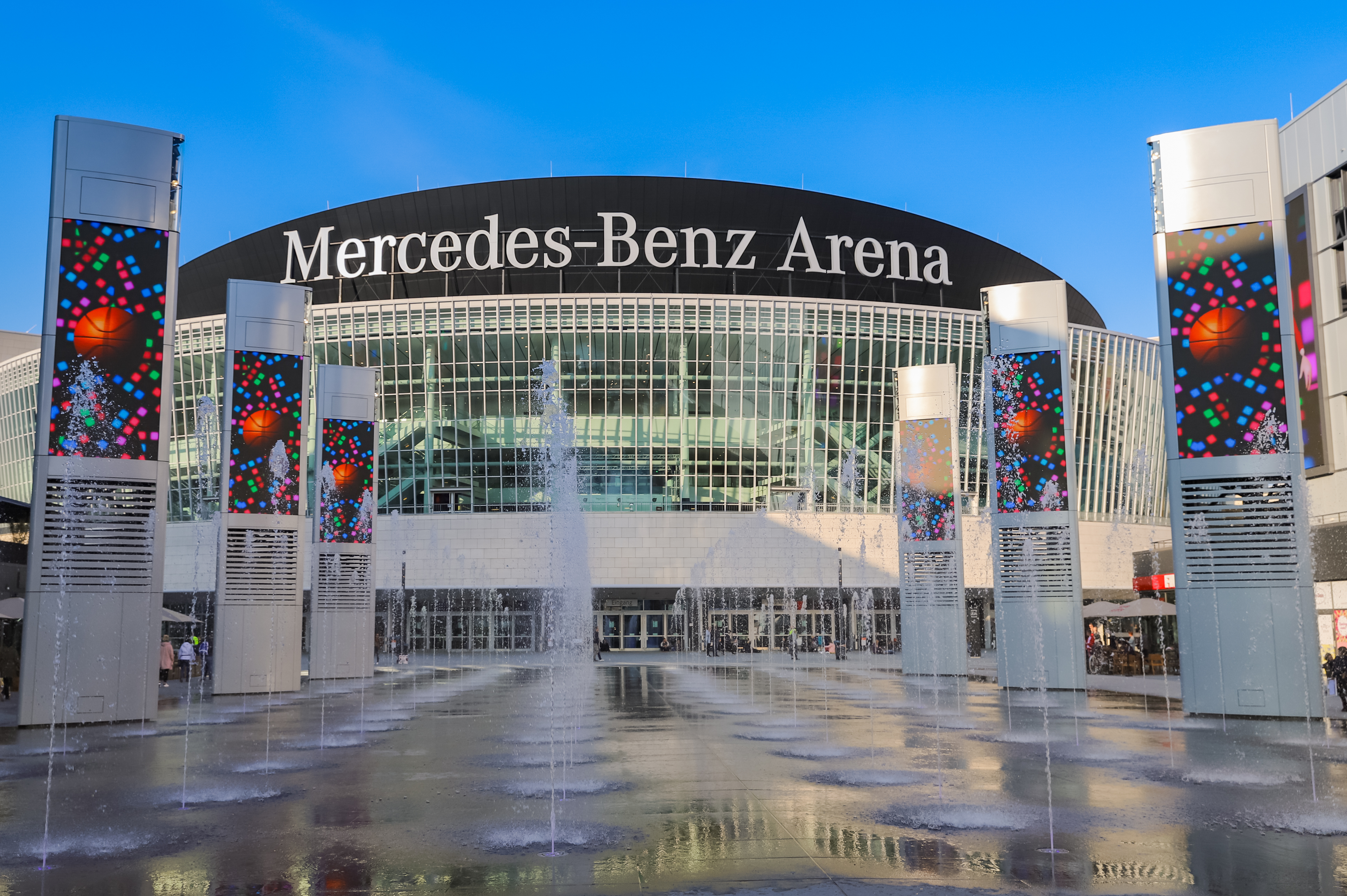
Mercedes-Benz Arena

The main basketball club in Berlin is Alba Berlin, which dominated the Basketball Bundesliga especially in the late 90s and early 2000s. Alba won eight German Championships, nine German Cups, three German Supercups, and the FIBA Korać Cup in 1995. With an average attendance of more than 10,000 fans per game in a season, it is also one of the most popular basketball clubs in Europe.

The city is also home to ASV Berlin, as well as the now-dissolved LSV Spandau, which won one German Championship in 1939.

Berlin was one of the hosts of the FIBA EuroBasket 1993 (where the German national basketball team won the gold medal) and one of the hosts of the FIBA EuroBasket 2015.

Club	Sport	Founded	League	Venue
Alba Berlin	Basketball	1991	BBL	Mercedes-Benz Arena

== Ice hockey ==
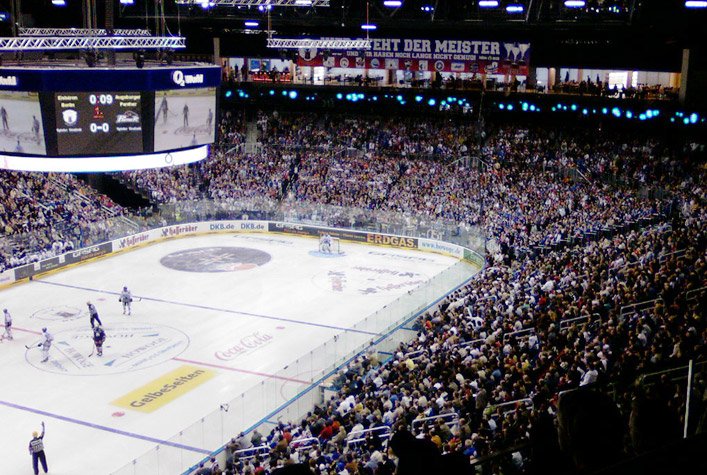
The Eisbären in the Uber Arena

The main ice hockey club in Berlin is Eisbären Berlin. The Eisbären have won the DEL championship more times than any other team. The club has captured 11 DEL titles, most recently in 2025. They won the German ice hockey cup in 2008 as well as the European Trophy in 2010. Before reunification the team played as part of sports club SC Dynamo Berlin and won the East German ice hockey championship 15 times.

Club	Sport	Founded	League	Venue
Eisbären Berlin	Ice hockey	1954	DEL	Uber Arena

== Handball ==
The main handball club in Berlin is Füchse Berlin. The team won the DHB-Pokal in 2014, the EHF Cup in 2015 and 2018 and the IHF Super Globe in 2015 and 2016.

Club	Sport	Founded	League	Venue
Füchse Berlin	Handball	1891	HBL	Max-Schmeling-Halle

Karl Schelenz, "father" of Handball was born in Berlin in 1890.

== Volleyball ==
The main volleyball club in the city is Berlin Recycling Volleys. The team won seven titles in Deutsche Bundesliga.

Club	Sport	Founded	League	Venue
Berlin Recycling Volleys	Volleyball	1911	DVL	Max-Schmeling-Halle

== American football ==
Berlin Thunder is an American football team, playing in the European League of Football (ELF).

Club	Sport	Founded	League	Venue
Berlin Thunder	American football	2021	ELF	Friedrich-Ludwig-Jahn-Sportpark

== Athletics ==
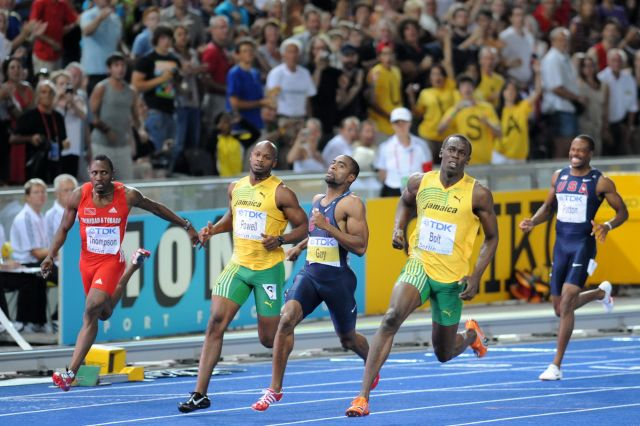
Usain Bolt broke his sprint world record 2009 in Berlin.

The Berlin Marathon is one of the largest and most popular road races in the world. In 2008 alone the race had 40,827 enrolled starters from 107 countries, 35,913 official finishers and more than one million spectators. Along with five other races, it forms the World Marathon Majors.

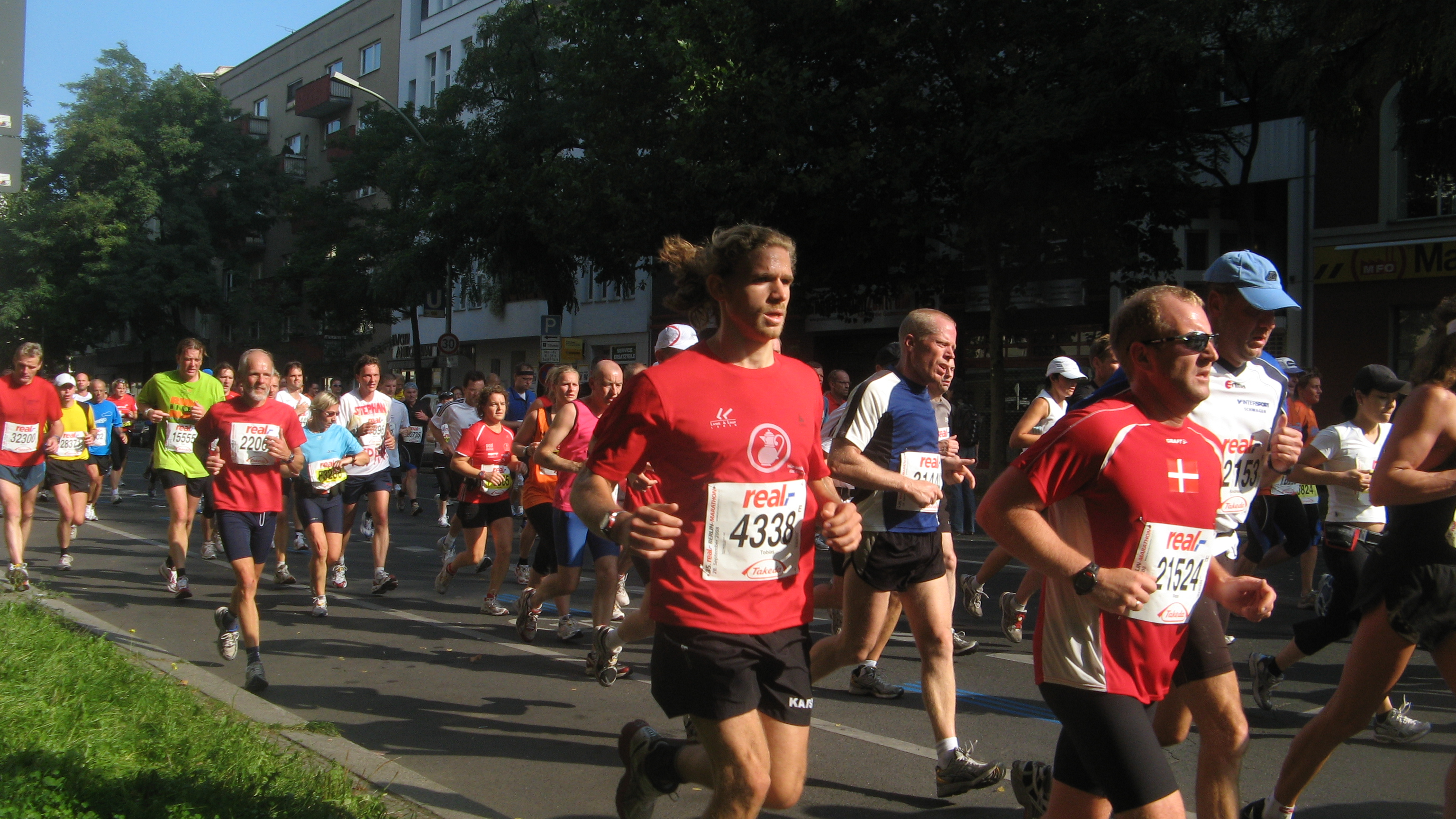
The annual Berlin-Marathon

The most marathon world records for men and women have been set at the Berlin course, which is known for its flat profile and even surface. The event is split over 2 days. About 8,000 additional inline skaters compete at the marathon course the Saturday before the running event. Power walkers, handbikers, wheelchair riders, and a children's marathon (4.2195 km) are also part of the marathon weekend, which is organised by SCC EVENTS.

The annual IAAF World Challenge event ISTAF for athletics are also held here.

The IAAF World Championships in Athletics were held in the Olympiastadion in August 2009. In the men's 100 metres dash, Usain Bolt broke his own 100 metres sprint world record with a time of 9.58.

== Motorsport ==
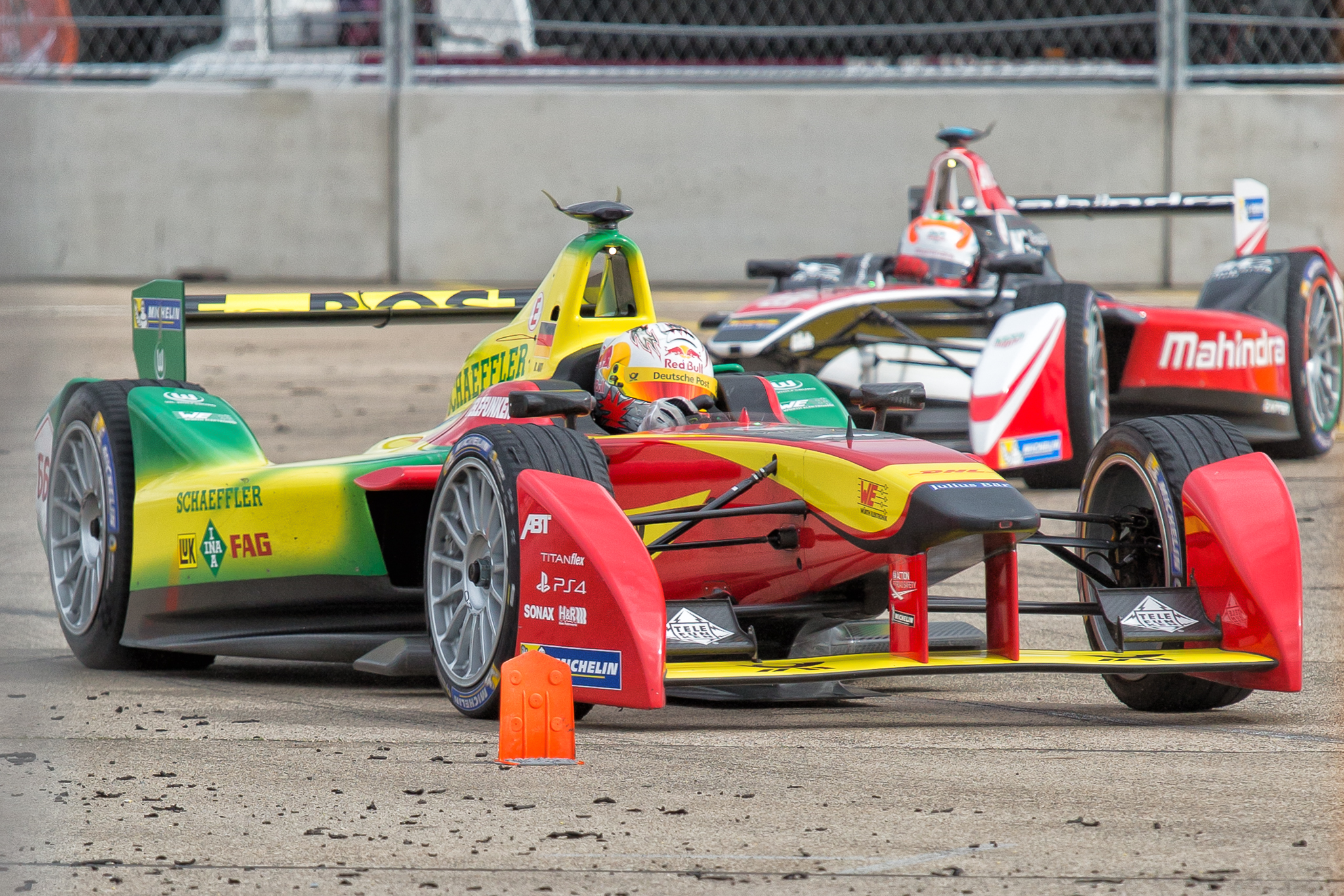
Formula E racer in Berlin Tempelhof, 2015

In 1921, Germany's first motorsport track, the Automobil-Verkehrs- und Übungsstraße ('Automobile traffic and training road'), short AVUS, was built in the south-west of Berlin. The first race took place on 24 September of the same year, with 300,000 spectators lining the roadside. The first German Grand Prix was held in 1926. The last race before World War II was in 1937. A first Formula One race was held in 1954, although not as part of the World Championship. The last German Grand Prix on the AVUS, as part of the World Championship, was held in 1959. After this, the AVUS was used for sports car and motorcycle racing until 1996.

The 2015 Berlin ePrix was a Formula E motor race that took place on 23 May 2015 on the purpose-built Tempelhof Airport Street Circuit in Berlin. It was the eighth round of the 2014–15 Formula E season. A special anti-clockwise track was built for the race next to the terminal building of the closed airport Tempelhof, including 17 turns over a distance of 2.469 km (1.534 mi).

== Snooker ==
Berlin has hosted several times the German Masters, a snooker ranking tournament. It is held at the Tempodrom since the 2011 tournament.

== Skateboarding & BMX ==
The Mellowpark in Köpenick is one of the biggest skate and BMX parks in Europe.

== Venues ==
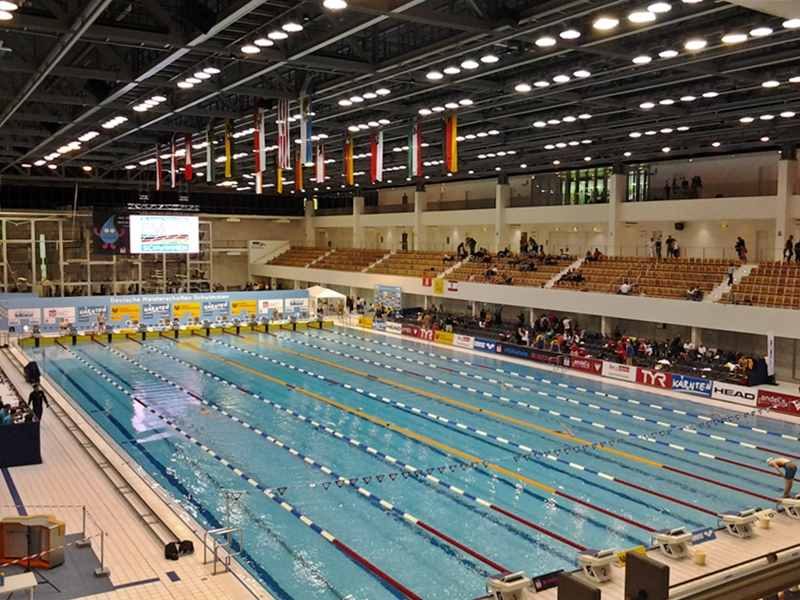
Europasportpark

The traditional Sechstagerennen (Six Day Race) takes place in the Velodrom every January. Around 75,000 spectators attend this sport event every year. The Velodrom holds up to 12,000 people and is also one of the largest concert venues in the city.

Next to the venue, the Europasportpark SSE is one of the biggest swimming and diving pools in Europe, where both professional clubs and locals can swim their laps. The venue was host to many national and international competitions in all kind of swim sports from high diving to swimming the crawl. The 2014 European Aquatics Championships took place in the Europasportpark.

Both venues form a sports complex built in the course of the application of Berlin, for the 2000 Summer Olympics.

== International sporting events ==
=== 1936 Summer Olympics ===
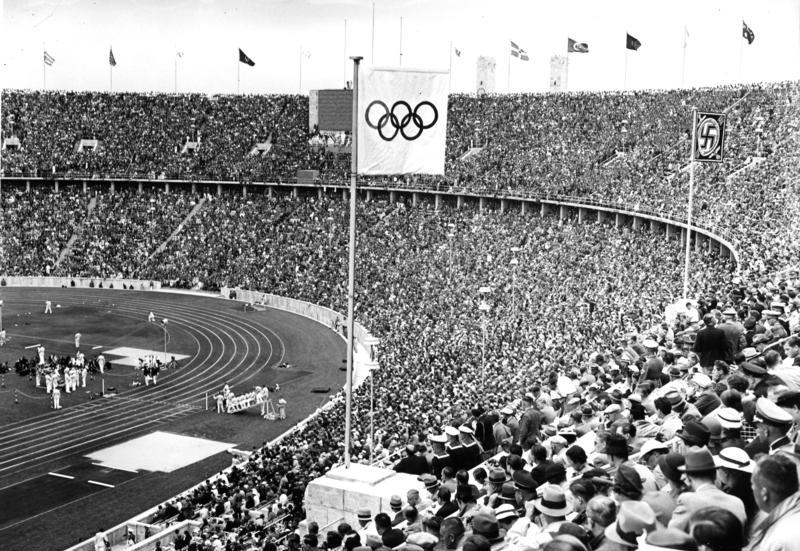
The Olympic Flag flying over the Olympic Stadium, Berlin 1936

The 1936 Summer Olympics, officially known as the Games of the XI Olympiad, was an international multi-sport event that was held in 1936 in Berlin, Germany. Berlin won the bid to host the Games over Barcelona, Spain, on 26 April 1931, at the 29th IOC Session.

Germany built a new 100,000-seat track and field stadium, six gymnasiums, and many other smaller arenas. They also installed a closed-circuit television system and radio network that reached 41 countries, with many other forms of expensive high-tech electronic equipment. Filmmaker Leni Riefenstahl, was commissioned by the German Olympic Committee to film the Games. Her film, titled Olympia, pioneered many of the techniques now common in the filming of sports.

The Olympic village was located at Elstal in Wustermark on the western edge of Berlin. The site, which was 30 kilometres (19 mi) from the centre of the city, consisted of one to two-floor dormitories, dining areas, a swimming pool, and training facilities.

Total ticket revenues were 7.5 million Reichsmark, generating a profit of over one million marks. The official budget did not include outlays by the city of Berlin (which issued an itemized report detailing its costs of 16.5 million marks) or outlays of the German national government.

=== 1974 FIFA World Cup Group A ===
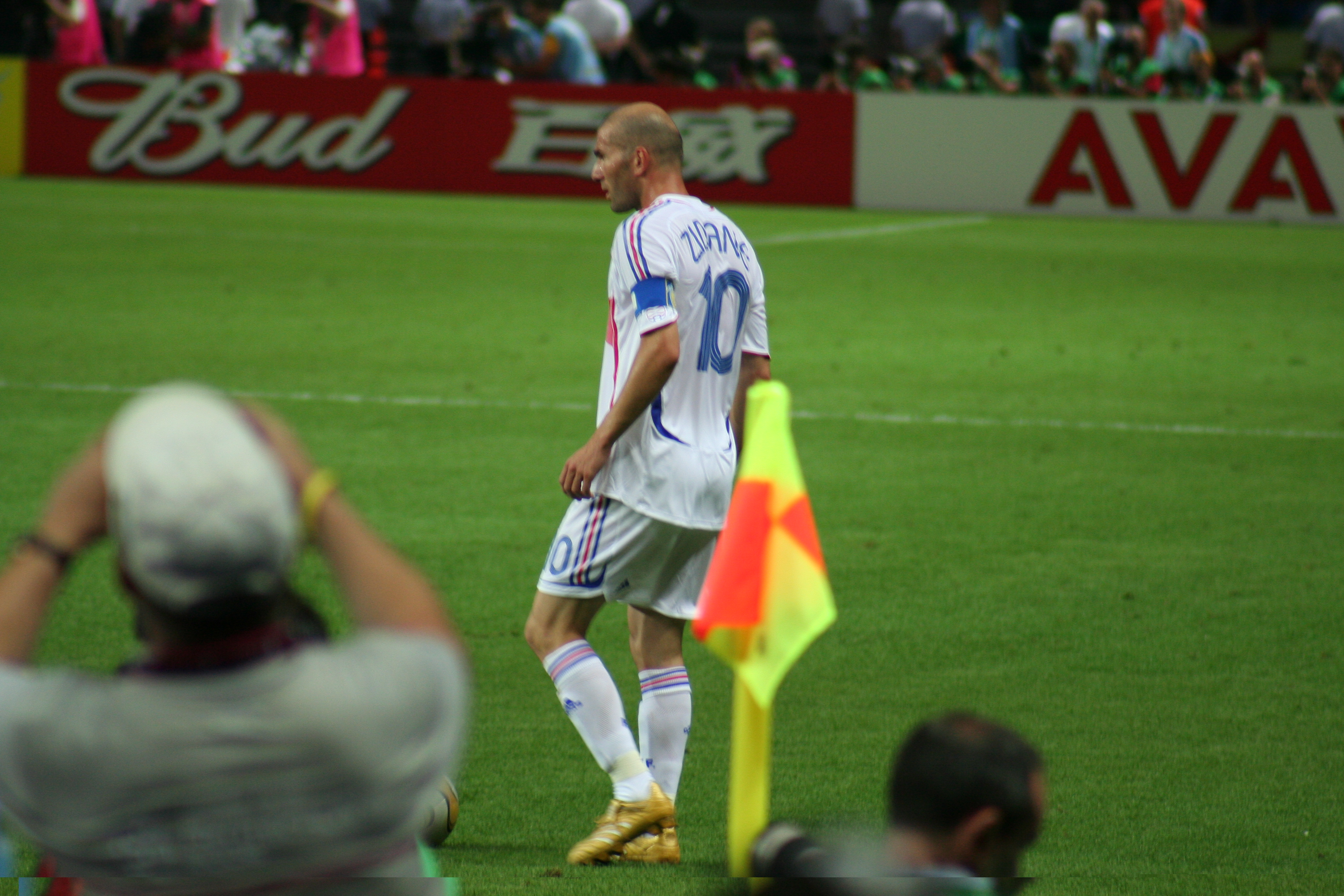
Zinedine Zidane at the 2006 FIFA World Cup Final

Group A at the 1974 FIFA World Cup featured three matches at Berlin's Olympic Stadium, all involving Chile, against West Germany, East Germany and Australia. West Germany won 1–0, although the other matches were draws. The infamous match between the two German teams, however, was played in Hamburg.

=== 2006 FIFA World Cup Final ===
The 2006 FIFA World Cup Final was held on 9 July 2006 at Berlin's Olympiastadion to determine the winner of the 2006 FIFA World Cup. Italy beat France in a shootout after the match finished 1–1 after extra time. France's Zinedine Zidane was sent off in his last-ever match, for headbutting Italy's Marco Materazzi's chest in retaliation to verbal insults.

=== 2015 UEFA Champions League Finals ===
In May 2013 the Olympiastadion was chosen as the venue for the 2015 UEFA Champions League Final. In July 2014 it was announced that Berlin would also be the host for the 2015 UEFA Women's Champions League Final. The women's final was played at the Friedrich-Ludwig-Jahn-Sportpark.

=== 2023 Special Olympics World Summer Games ===
Berlin will host the 2023 Special Olympics World Summer Games. It will mark the first time that Germany have ever hosted the Special Olympics.

== Berliner Olympians ==
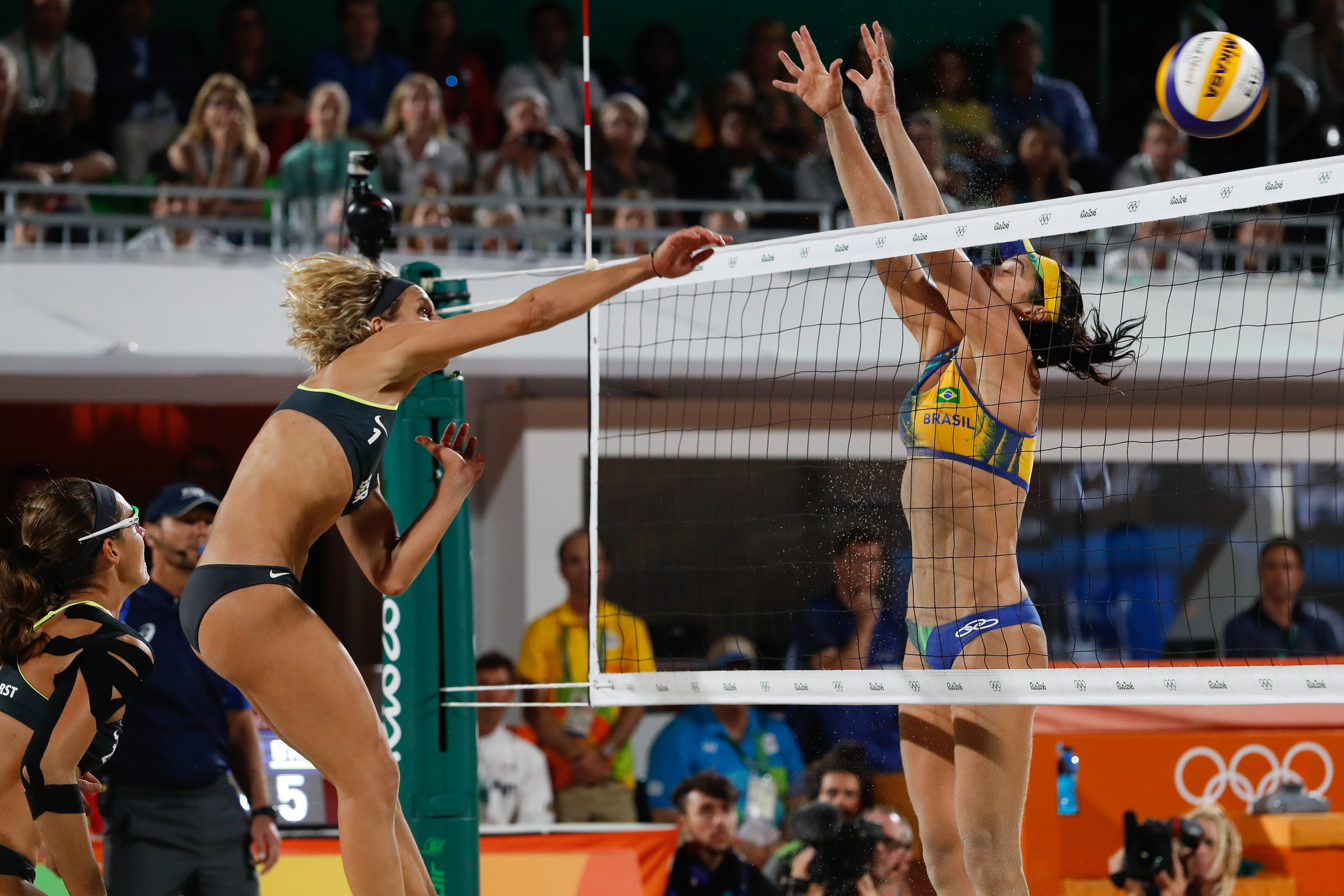
Laura Ludwig (left) gold medalist

- Franziska van Almsick
- Robert Harting
- Laura Ludwig
- Claudia Pechstein
- Jochen Schümann
- Hagen Stamm
- Ulf Timmermann
- Katarina Witt

== See also ==
- List of people from Berlin
- Football in Germany

Preceded by Basel, Switzerland (1969)	World Gymnaestrada host city 1975	Succeeded by Zürich, Switzerland (1982)
Preceded by Amsterdam, Netherlands (1991)	World Gymnaestrada host city 1995	Succeeded by Gothenburg, Sweden (1999)
