= 2011 German Masters =

Tournament information
- Dates: 2–6 February 2011
- Venue: Tempodrom
- City: Berlin
- Country: Germany
- Organisation: World Snooker
- Format: Ranking event
- Total prize fund: €280,000
- Winner's share: €50,000
- Highest break: John Higgins (SCO) (143)

Final
- Champion: Mark Williams (WAL)
- Runner-up: Mark Selby (ENG)
- Score: 9–7

The 2011 German Masters was a professional ranking snooker tournament that took place between 2–6 February at the Tempodrom in Berlin, Germany.

The event was last held in 1998, but it was non-ranking. John Parrott won in the final 6–4 against Mark Williams.

Mark Williams won his 18th ranking title by defeating Mark Selby 9–7 in the final.

== Prize fund ==
The breakdown of prize money for 2011 is shown below:

Winner: €50,000
Runner-up: €30,000
Semi-finalists: €15,000
Quarter-finalists: €9,000
Last 16: €6,000
Last 32: €3,750
Last 48: €1,500

Highest break: €2,000

Total: €280,000

== Wildcard round ==
These matches were played in Berlin on 2 and 3 February 2011.

Match		Score	
WC1	Anthony Hamilton (ENG)	5–1	Pavel Leyk (GER)
WC2	Thanawat Thirapongpaiboon (THA)	5–3	Tomasz Skalski (BEL)
WC3	Jack Lisowski (ENG)	5–2	Luca Brecel (BEL)
WC4	Liu Song (CHN)	2–5	Daniel Wells (WAL)
WC5	Nigel Bond (ENG)	5–2	Stefan Kasper (GER)
WC6	Anthony McGill (SCO)	w/o–w/d	Mario Wehrmann (NLD)
WC7	Joe Swail (NIR)	5–0	Hans Blanckaert (BEL)
WC8	Robert Milkins (ENG)	5–1	Lasse Münstermann (GER)

== Main draw ==
Last 32; Best of 9 frames
1	Neil Robertson (AUS)	4
Anthony Hamilton (ENG)	5
10	Graeme Dott (SCO)	5
Thanawat Thirapongpaiboon (THA)	1
15	Ricky Walden (ENG)	5
Jack Lisowski (ENG)	2
8	Stephen Maguire (SCO)	5
Daniel Wells (WAL)	2
6	Mark Selby (ENG)	5
Nigel Bond (ENG)	1
14	Stephen Hendry (SCO)	5
Judd Trump (ENG)	2
12	Peter Ebdon (ENG)	5
Andrew Higginson (ENG)	3
4	Ding Junhui (CHN)	5
Matthew Stevens (WAL)	1
3	Mark Williams (WAL)	5
Anthony McGill (SCO)	1
9	Ronnie O'Sullivan (ENG)	w/d
Dominic Dale (WAL)	w/o
13	Jamie Cope (ENG)	3
Joe Perry (ENG)	5
7	Ali Carter (ENG)	5
Stephen Lee (ENG)	4
5	Shaun Murphy (ENG)	5
Ryan Day (WAL)	3
11	Mark Allen (NIR)	3
Joe Swail (NIR)	5
16	Mark King (ENG)	1
Marco Fu (HKG)	5
2	John Higgins (SCO)	5
Robert Milkins (ENG)	3

Last 16; Best of 9 frames
(England) Anthony Hamilton	2
10	(Scotland) Graeme Dott	5
15	(England) Ricky Walden	0
8	(Scotland) Stephen Maguire	5
6	(England) Mark Selby	5
14	(Scotland) Stephen Hendry	3
12	(England) Peter Ebdon	2
4	(China) Ding Junhui	5
3	(Wales) Mark Williams	5
(Wales) Dominic Dale	2
(England) Joe Perry	5
7	(England) Ali Carter	1
5	(England) Shaun Murphy	2
(Northern Ireland) Joe Swail	5
(Hong Kong) Marco Fu	w/o
2	(Scotland) John Higgins	w/d

Quarter-finals; Best of 9 frames
10	(Scotland) Graeme Dott	5
8	(Scotland) Stephen Maguire	2
6	(England) Mark Selby	5
4	(China) Ding Junhui	1
3	(Wales) Mark Williams	5
(England) Joe Perry	1
(Northern Ireland) Joe Swail	1
(Hong Kong) Marco Fu	5

Semi-finals; Best of 11 frames
10	(Scotland) Graeme Dott	4
6	(England) Mark Selby	6
3	(Wales) Mark Williams	6
(Hong Kong) Marco Fu	3

Final; Best of 17 frames
6	(England) Mark Selby	7
3	(Wales) Mark Williams	9

== Final ==
Final: Best of 17 frames. Referee: Jan Verhaas. Tempodrom, Berlin, Germany, 6 February 2011.
Mark Selby (6); England	7–9	Mark Williams (3); Wales
Afternoon: 92–0 (82), 0–84 (56), 0–108 (108), 99–1, 0–81, 71–0 (63), 42–83 (53), 0–105 (105); Evening: 46–71, 54–41, 0–121 (96), 70–27, 83–7 (60), 70–45, 49–76, 0–83 (82)
82	Highest break	108
0	Century breaks	2
3	50+ breaks	6

== Qualifying ==
These matches were held between 14 and 17 December 2010 at the World Snooker Academy, Sheffield, England.

=== Round 1 ===
Anthony Hamilton (ENG)	5–4	Kurt Maflin (NOR)
Fergal O'Brien (IRL)	2–5	Adam Wicheard (ENG)
Patrick Wallace (NIR)	0–5	Thanawat Thirapongpaiboon (THA)
Alfie Burden (ENG)	5–2	Zhang Anda (CHN)
Mike Dunn (ENG)	–	Bye
Jack Lisowski (ENG)	5–2	James McBain (SCO)
Jamie Burnett (SCO)	5–4	James Wattana (THA)
Bjorn Haneveer (BEL)	3–5	Liu Song (CHN)
Barry Pinches (ENG)	4–5	Kyren Wilson (ENG)
Nigel Bond (ENG)	5–0	Reanne Evans (ENG)
Jimmy White (ENG)	5–2	Liam Highfield (ENG)
Jimmy Robertson (ENG)	5–2	Igor Figueiredo (BRA)
Tony Drago (MLT)	5–4	Kuldesh Johal (ENG)
Ian McCulloch (ENG)	5–1	Issara Kachaiwong (THA)
Rod Lawler (ENG)	2–5	Simon Bedford (ENG)
Andy Hicks (ENG)	5–1	Paul Davison (ENG)

Joe Jogia (ENG)	1–5	Jamie O'Neill (ENG)
Anthony McGill (SCO)	5–2	Michael White (WAL)
Stuart Pettman (ENG)	w/d–w/o	Xiao Guodong (CHN)
Dominic Dale (WAL)	5–4	David Morris (IRL)
Mark Joyce (ENG)	5–1	Andrew Pagett (WAL)
Alan McManus (SCO)	5–0	Jak Jones (WAL)
Matthew Selt (ENG)	5–3	Ben Woollaston (ENG)
Michael Holt (ENG)	3–5	David Gilbert (ENG)
Rory McLeod (ENG)	3–5	Matthew Couch (ENG)
Steve Davis (ENG)	w/o–w/d	Michael Judge (IRL)
Peter Lines (ENG)	2–5	Joe Delaney (IRL)
Joe Swail (NIR)	5–1	Justin Astley (ENG)
Dave Harold (ENG)	5–0	Dermot McGlinchey (NIR)
Adrian Gunnell (ENG)	5–0	Noppon Saengkham (THA)
Robert Milkins (ENG)	5–4	Jimmy Michie (ENG)
Jamie Jones (WAL)	5–2	Liu Chuang (CHN)

=== Round 2 ===
(England) Anthony Hamilton	5–1	(England) Adam Wicheard
(Thailand) Thanawat Thirapongpaiboon	5–1	(England) Alfie Burden
(England) Mike Dunn	3–5	(England) Jack Lisowski
(Scotland) Jamie Burnett	4–5	(China) Liu Song
(England) Kyren Wilson	2–5	(England) Nigel Bond
(England) Jimmy White	1–5	(England) Jimmy Robertson
(Malta) Tony Drago	w/o–w/d	(England) Ian McCulloch
(England) Simon Bedford	5–2	(England) Andy Hicks

(England) Jamie O'Neill	1–5	(Scotland) Anthony McGill
(China) Xiao Guodong	3–5	(Wales) Dominic Dale
(England) Mark Joyce	3–5	(Scotland) Alan McManus
(England) Matthew Selt	5–3	(England) David Gilbert
(England) Matthew Couch	2–5	(England) Steve Davis
(Republic of Ireland) Joe Delaney	2–5	(Northern Ireland) Joe Swail
(England) Dave Harold	5–2	(England) Adrian Gunnell
(England) Robert Milkins	5–3	(Wales) Jamie Jones

=== Round 3 ===
Stuart Bingham (ENG)	1–5	(England) Anthony Hamilton
Barry Hawkins (ENG)	2–5	(Thailand) Thanawat Thirapongpaiboon
Marcus Campbell (SCO)	3–5	(England) Jack Lisowski
Ken Doherty (IRL)	4–5	(China) Liu Song
Liang Wenbo (CHN)	2–5	(England) Nigel Bond
Judd Trump (ENG)	5–3	(England) Jimmy Robertson
Andrew Higginson (ENG)	5–2	(Malta) Tony Drago
Matthew Stevens (WAL)	5–3	(England) Simon Bedford

Tom Ford (ENG)	2–5	(Scotland) Anthony McGill
Gerard Greene (NIR)	3–5	(Wales) Dominic Dale
Joe Perry (ENG)	5–3	(Scotland) Alan McManus
Stephen Lee (ENG)	5–2	(England) Matthew Selt
Ryan Day (WAL)	5–0	(England) Steve Davis
Martin Gould (ENG)	0–5	(Northern Ireland) Joe Swail
Marco Fu (HKG)	5–3	(England) Dave Harold
Mark Davis (ENG)	4–5	(England) Robert Milkins

== Century breaks ==
=== Qualifying stage centuries ===
- 133, 120 – Mark Joyce
- 130, 130, 113 – Jamie Burnett
- 130 – Issara Kachaiwong
- 127 – Alan McManus
- 126 – Matthew Selt
- 126 – James Wattana
- 121, 119 – Andy Hicks
- 121 – Rod Lawler
- 119 – Matthew Stevens
- 113 – David Gilbert
- 111 – Simon Bedford
- 107, 100 – Liu Song
- 106, 103 – Anthony Hamilton
- 105, 102 – Dominic Dale
- 105 – Thanawat Thirapongpaiboon
- 105 – Steve Davis
- 104 – Dave Harold
- 103 – Anthony McGill
- 101 – Marco Fu
- 101 – David Morris
- 100, 100 – Jimmy Robertson
- 100 – Fergal O'Brien
- 100 – Jack Lisowski
- 100 – Tony Drago

=== Televised stage centuries ===
- 143 – John Higgins
- 142 – Ryan Day
- 140 – Andrew Higginson
- 140 – Graeme Dott
- 130 – Stephen Maguire
- 127, 116, 104 – Anthony Hamilton
- 124, 118, 100 – Ding Junhui
- 122, 108, 105, 104 – Mark Williams
- 112 – Joe Swail
- 105 – Mark Selby
- 100 – Joe Perry

== Gallery ==
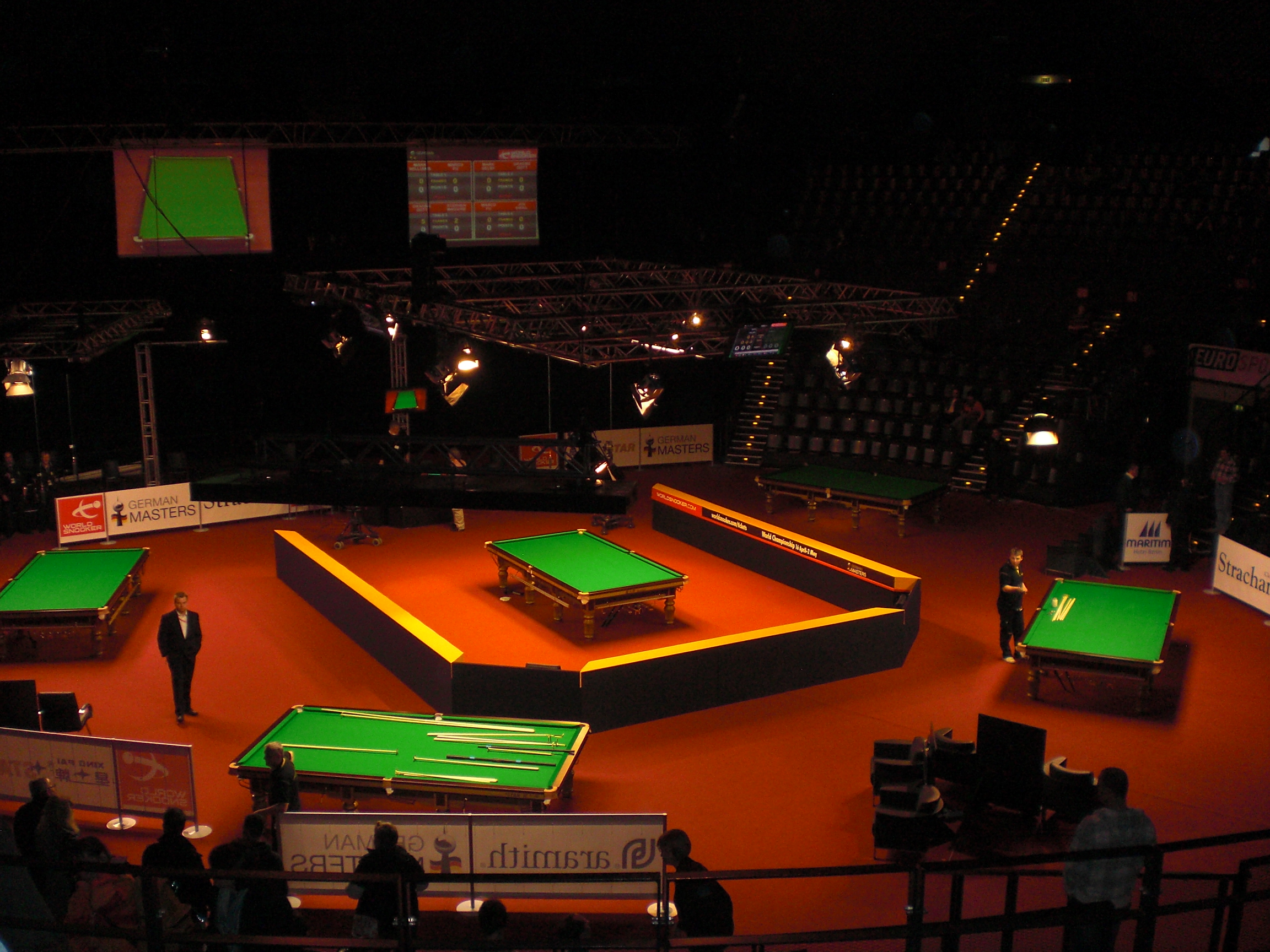
Inside the venue

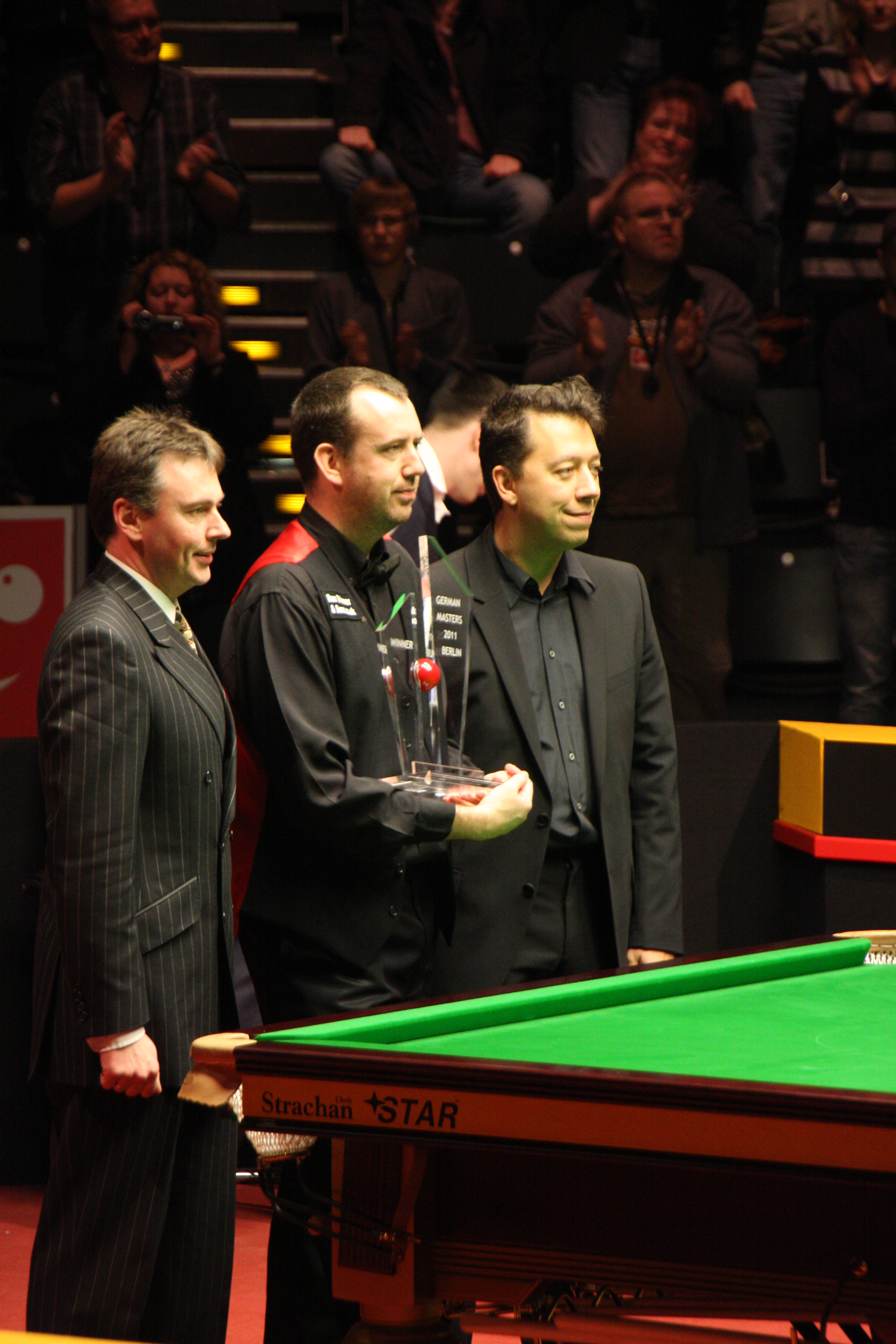
Mark Williams after winning the title

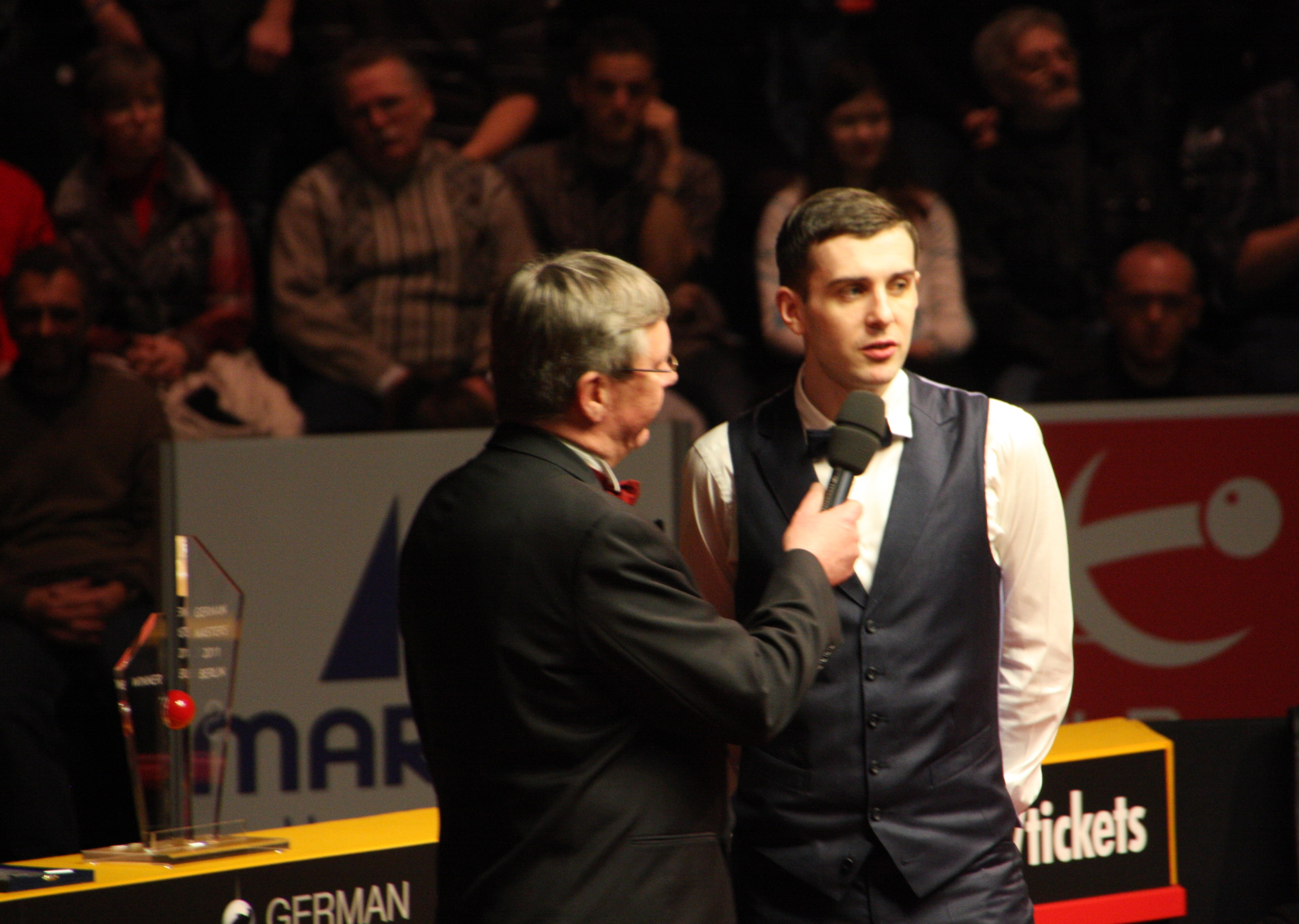
Mark Selby being interviewed after the final

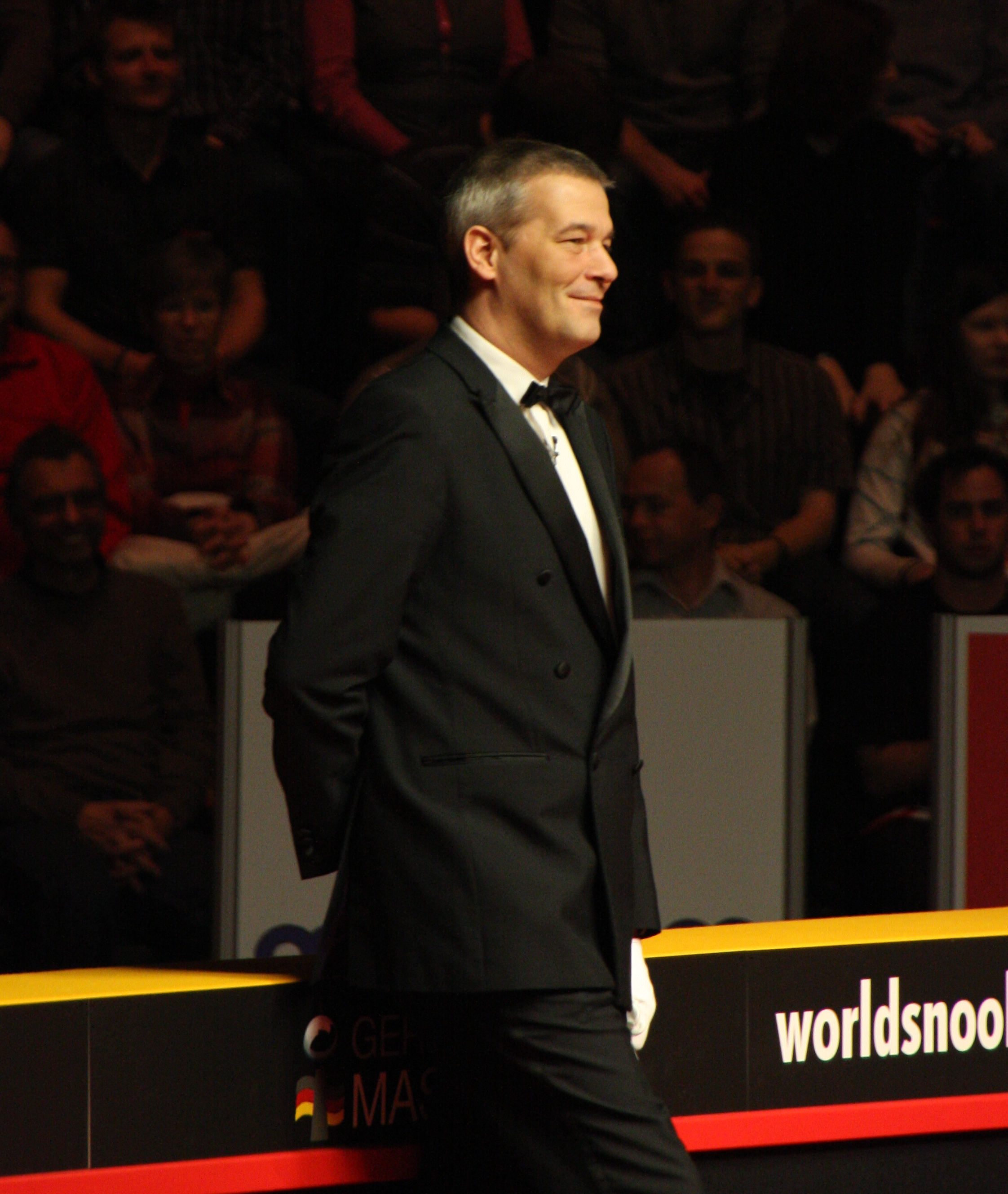
Referee Jan Verhaas

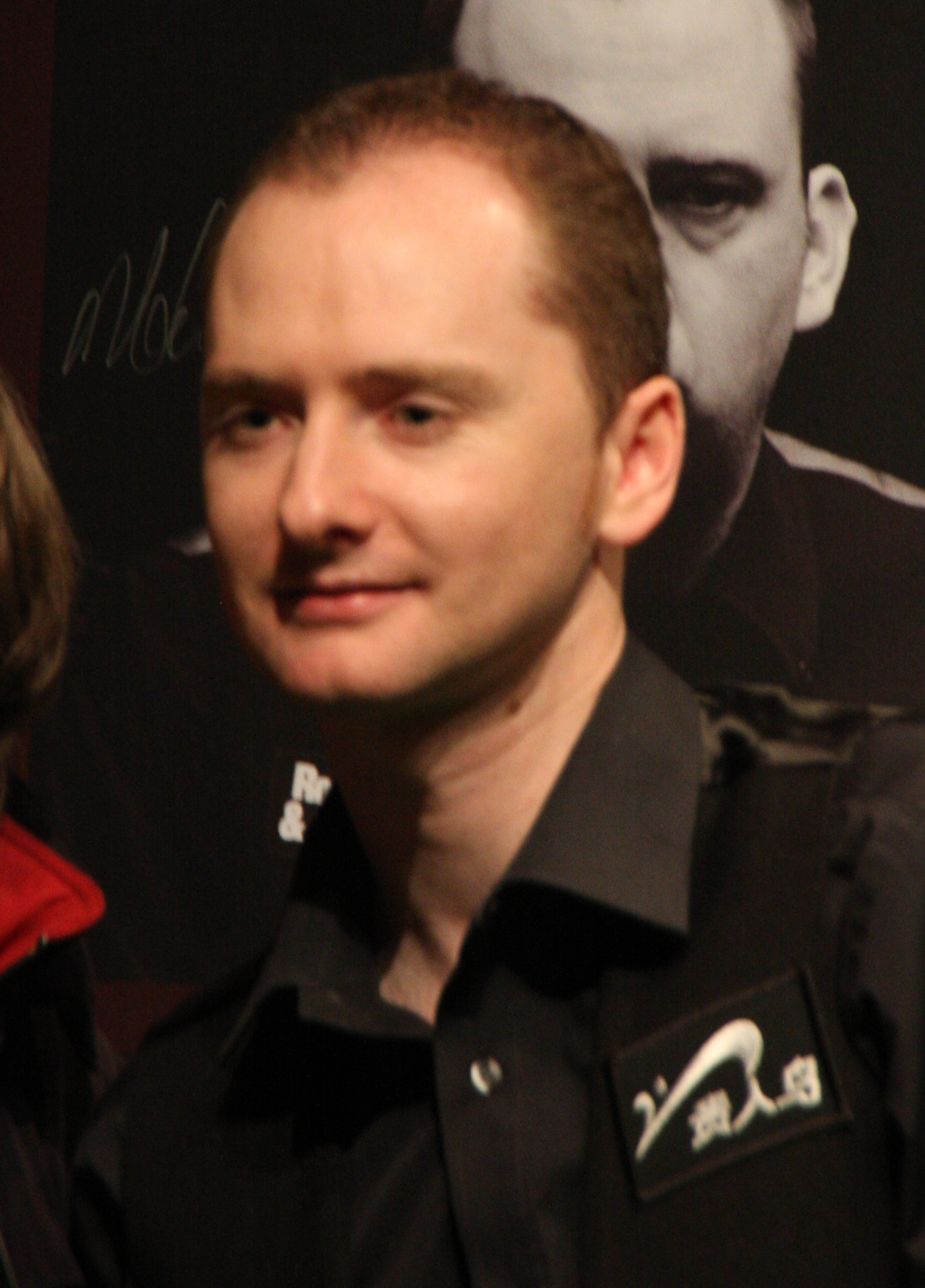
Semi-finalist Graeme Dott

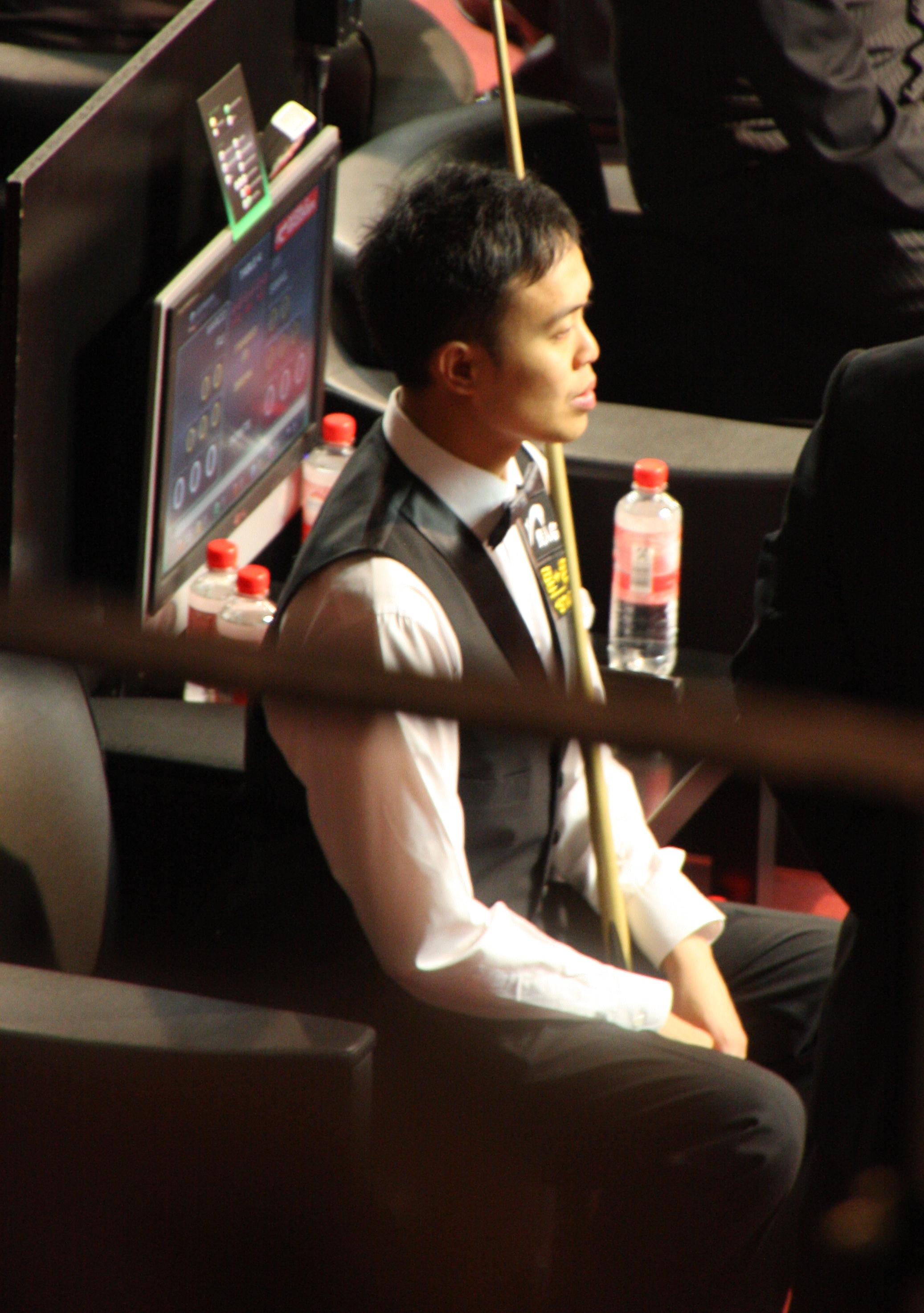
Semi-finalist Marco Fu
