= German Masters =

Annual professional snooker tournament

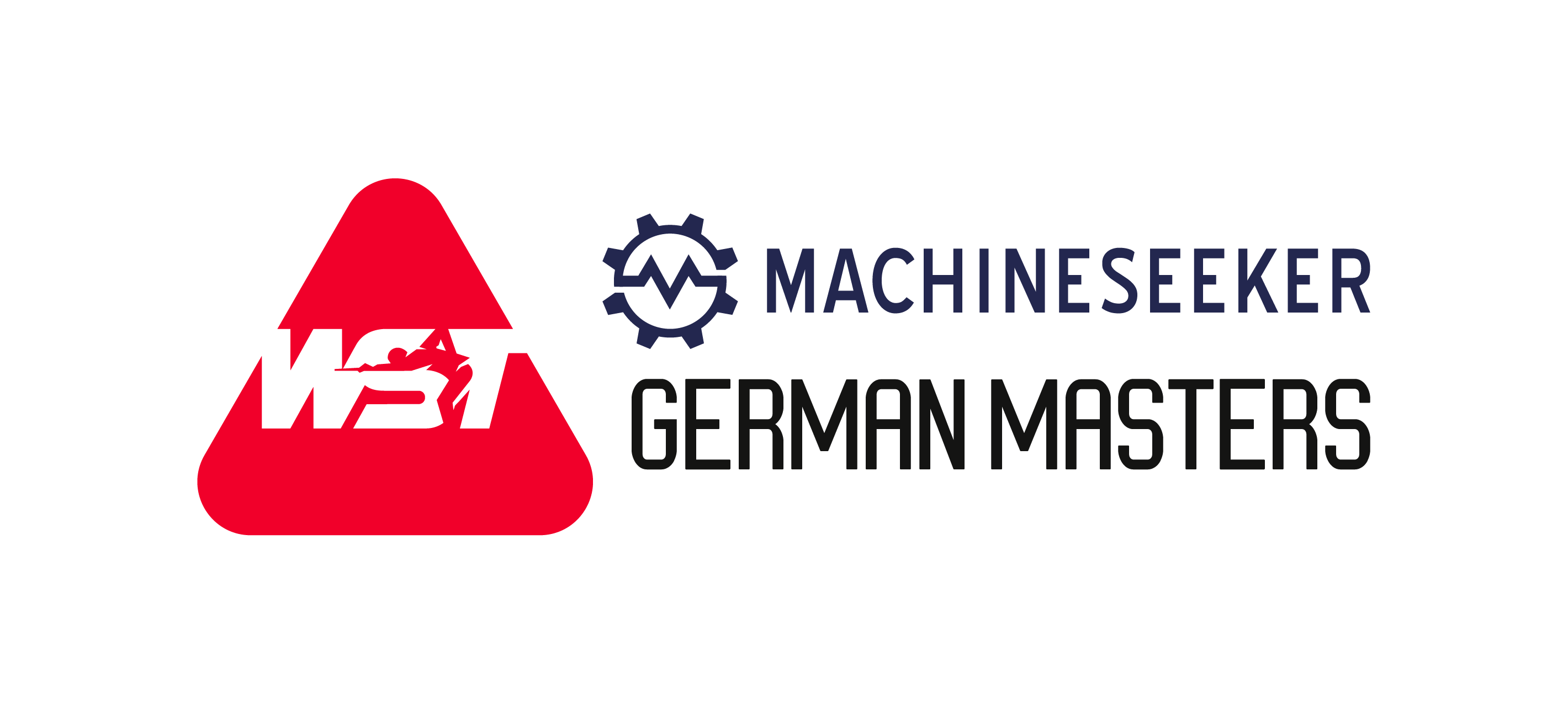

Tournament information
- Venue: Tempodrom
- Location: Berlin
- Country: Germany
- Established: 1995; 31 years ago
- Organisation(s): World Snooker Tour
- Format: Ranking event
- Total prize fund: £550,400
- Recent edition: 2026
- Current champion: Judd Trump (ENG)

The German Masters is a professional ranking snooker tournament. It originated as the German Open, a ranking event held in Germany from 1995 to 1997. The tournament became the German Masters in 1998, when it was staged once as a non-ranking invitational event. Revived as a ranking event in 2011, the tournament has been staged annually since then at the Tempodrom in Berlin bar the 2021 edition in England during the COVID-19 pandemic. The most successful player in the tournament's history is Judd Trump, who has won the title four times, in 2020, 2021, 2024, and 2026. Ali Carter, Mark Williams, and Kyren Wilson have all won the title twice. The reigning champion is Trump.

== History ==
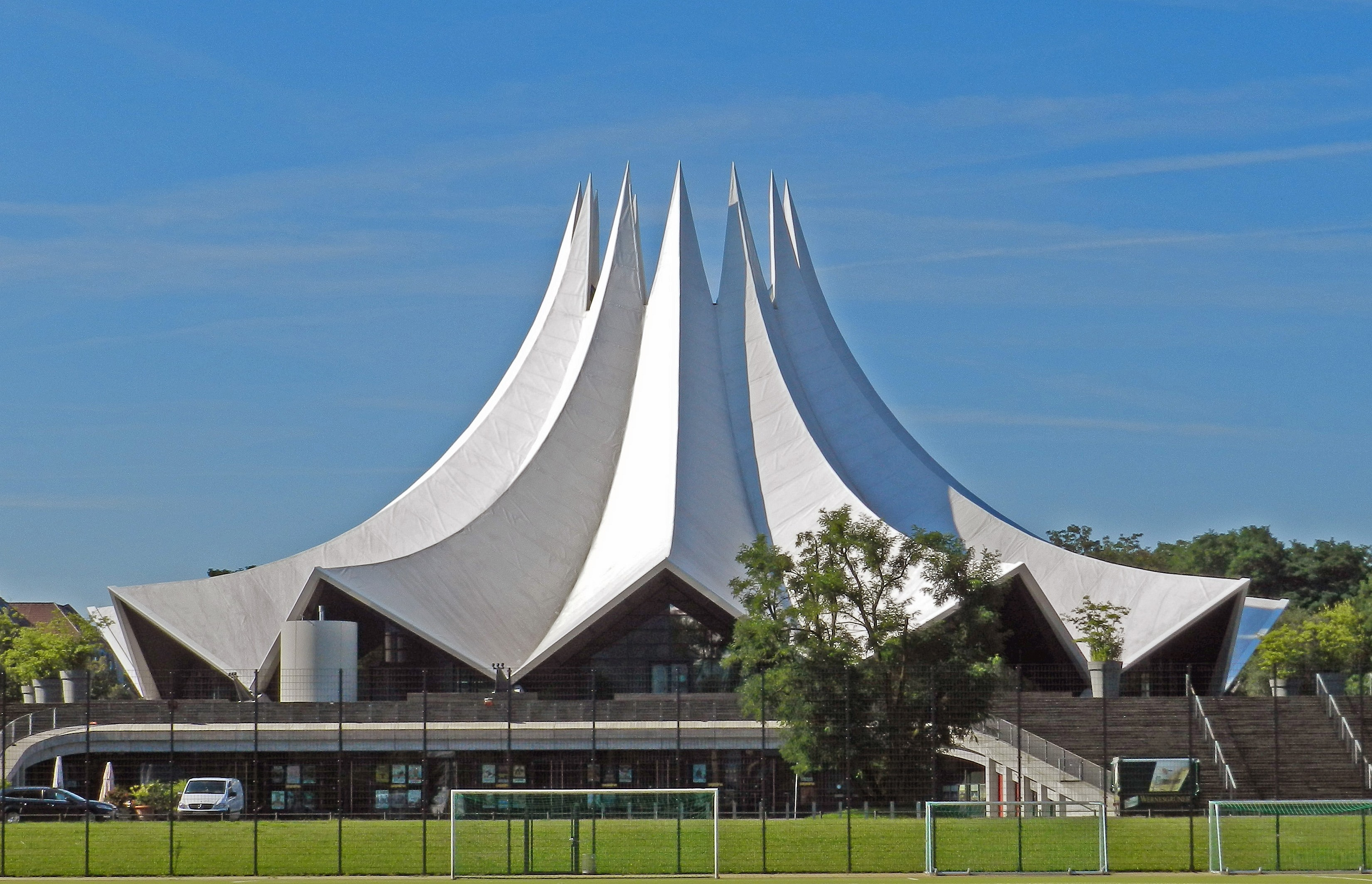
The event has been held at the Tempodrom in Berlin since 2011.

The tournament started as the German Open and was a ranking tournament from 1995 to 1997. The first event was played in Frankfurt in December 1995, replacing the European Open in the December place in the calendar, the European Open being moved to early 1996. The tournament involved the top 16 players in the world ranking who were joined by 16 qualifiers and 4 wild-card players. The four lowest ranked qualifiers played the wild-card players, winning all their four matches and advancing to the last-32. John Higgins met Ken Doherty in the final. The match was level at three frame each before Higgins won the next six frames to win 9–3 and take the first prize of £40,000. Higgins made a break of 139 in the final to also win the high break prize of £5,000.

The 1996 event was again held in December, at the British military base at Osnabrück. Only 16 players competed in Germany. The final qualifying round in which the top-16 seeds played 16 players from earlier qualifying rounds was played in Preston, Lancashire in November. Ronnie O'Sullivan met Alain Robidoux in the final, winning 9–7. O'Sullivan led 7–3 before Robidoux won the next four frames to level the match at 7–7. O'Sullivan then won the next two frames to win the match, finishing with a break of 108. Robidoux took the high break prize for a break of 145 in the final.

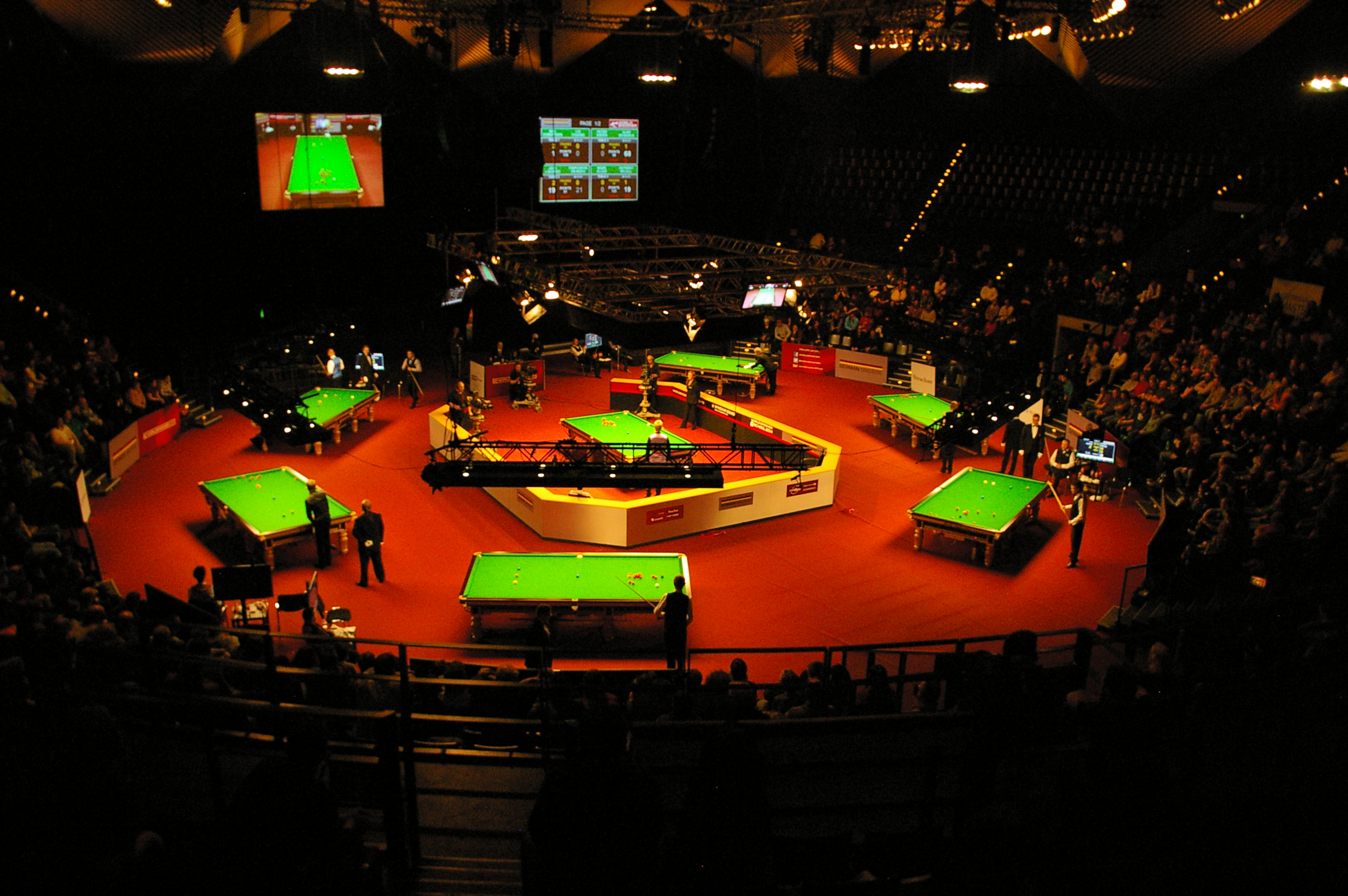
View of the setup during the 2014 event.

The 1997 event was held in Bingen am Rhein using the same format as in 1996. The final qualifying round was held in Hereford in September. John Higgins met John Parrott in the final, Higgins led 5–3 lead after the first session and then won the first three frames in the evening session to lead 8–3. Parrott won frame 12 but Higgins finished the match with a break of 105 in the next frame, winning the first prize of £50,000. In 1998 the event was again held at Bingen am Rhein but became an invitation event with 12 players competing. The name of the tournament was changed to German Masters. The winner received £25,000 with all 12 players guaranteed a minimum of £5,000. John Parrott beat Mark Williams 6–4 in the final. Williams led 4–3 but Parrott won the next three to win the match. The event then was discontinued, but returned for the 2010/2011 season as a ranking tournament.

The revived tournament has been held at the Tempodrom in Berlin since the 2011 edition. (Note: The 2021 event moved to the Marshall Arena in Milton Keynes, England, due to the COVID-19 pandemic.) The trophy was named after former World Snooker Tour director Brandon Parker in 2021.

In 2024 the World Snooker Tour announced that the televised stages of the tournament were to be increased from its normal five days to the traditional seven days.

== Winners ==
| Year | Winner | Runner-up | Final score | Venue | City | Season |
|---|---|---|---|---|---|---|
German Open (ranking, 1995–1997)
| 1995 | John Higgins (SCO) | Ken Doherty (IRL) | 9–3 | Messe Frankfurt | Frankfurt, Germany | 1995/96 |
| 1996 | Ronnie O'Sullivan (ENG) | Alain Robidoux (CAN) | 9–7 | Roberts Barracks | Osnabrück, Germany | 1996/97 |
| 1997 | John Higgins (SCO) | John Parrott (ENG) | 9–4 | Atlantis Rheinhotel | Bingen am Rhein, Germany | 1997/98 |
German Masters (non-ranking, 1998)
| 1998 | John Parrott (ENG) | Mark Williams (WAL) | 6–4 | Best Western Rheinhotel | Bingen am Rhein, Germany | 1998/99 |
German Masters (ranking, 2011–present)
| 2011 | Mark Williams (WAL) | Mark Selby (ENG) | 9–7 | Tempodrom | Berlin, Germany | 2010/11 |
| 2012 | Ronnie O'Sullivan (ENG) | Stephen Maguire (SCO) | 9–7 | Tempodrom | Berlin, Germany | 2011/12 |
| 2013 | Ali Carter (ENG) | Marco Fu (HKG) | 9–6 | Tempodrom | Berlin, Germany | 2012/13 |
| 2014 | Ding Junhui (CHN) | Judd Trump (ENG) | 9–5 | Tempodrom | Berlin, Germany | 2013/14 |
| 2015 | Mark Selby (ENG) | Shaun Murphy (ENG) | 9–7 | Tempodrom | Berlin, Germany | 2014/15 |
| 2016 | Martin Gould (ENG) | Luca Brecel (BEL) | 9–5 | Tempodrom | Berlin, Germany | 2015/16 |
| 2017 | Anthony Hamilton (ENG) | Ali Carter (ENG) | 9–6 | Tempodrom | Berlin, Germany | 2016/17 |
| 2018 | Mark Williams (WAL) | Graeme Dott (SCO) | 9–1 | Tempodrom | Berlin, Germany | 2017/18 |
| 2019 | Kyren Wilson (ENG) | David Gilbert (ENG) | 9–7 | Tempodrom | Berlin, Germany | 2018/19 |
| 2020 | Judd Trump (ENG) | Neil Robertson (AUS) | 9–6 | Tempodrom | Berlin, Germany | 2019/20 |
| 2021 | Judd Trump (ENG) | Jack Lisowski (ENG) | 9–2 | Marshall Arena | Milton Keynes, England | 2020/21 |
| 2022 | Zhao Xintong (CHN) | Yan Bingtao (CHN) | 9–0 | Tempodrom | Berlin, Germany | 2021/22 |
| 2023 | Ali Carter (ENG) | Tom Ford (ENG) | 10–3 | Tempodrom | Berlin, Germany | 2022/23 |
| 2024 | Judd Trump (ENG) | Si Jiahui (CHN) | 10–5 | Tempodrom | Berlin, Germany | 2023/24 |
| 2025 | Kyren Wilson (ENG) | Barry Hawkins (ENG) | 10–9 | Tempodrom | Berlin, Germany | 2024/25 |
| 2026 | Judd Trump (ENG) | Shaun Murphy (ENG) | 10–4 | Tempodrom | Berlin, Germany | 2025/26 |

== Finalists ==
| Name | Nationality | Winner | Runner-up | Finals |
|---|---|---|---|---|
| **Judd Trump** | England | 4 | 1 | 5 |
| **Mark Williams** | Wales | 2 | 1 | 3 |
| **Ali Carter** | England | 2 | 1 | 3 |
| **John Higgins** | Scotland | 2 | 0 | 2 |
| **Ronnie O'Sullivan** | England | 2 | 0 | 2 |
| **Kyren Wilson** | England | 2 | 0 | 2 |
| John Parrott | England | 1 | 1 | 2 |
| **Mark Selby** | England | 1 | 1 | 2 |
| **Ding Junhui** | China | 1 | 0 | 1 |
| Martin Gould | England | 1 | 0 | 1 |
| Anthony Hamilton | England | 1 | 0 | 1 |
| **Zhao Xintong** | China | 1 | 0 | 1 |
| **Shaun Murphy** | England | 0 | 2 | 2 |
| Ken Doherty | Ireland | 0 | 1 | 1 |
| Alain Robidoux | Canada | 0 | 1 | 1 |
| **Stephen Maguire** | Scotland | 0 | 1 | 1 |
| **Marco Fu** | Hong Kong | 0 | 1 | 1 |
| **Luca Brecel** | Belgium | 0 | 1 | 1 |
| Graeme Dott | Scotland | 0 | 1 | 1 |
| **David Gilbert** | England | 0 | 1 | 1 |
| **Neil Robertson** | Australia | 0 | 1 | 1 |
| **Jack Lisowski** | England | 0 | 1 | 1 |
| Yan Bingtao | China | 0 | 1 | 1 |
| **Tom Ford** | England | 0 | 1 | 1 |
| **Si Jiahui** | China | 0 | 1 | 1 |
| **Barry Hawkins** | England | 0 | 1 | 1 |

Legend
The names of active players are marked in **bold**.

== See also ==
- Paul Hunter Classic
- Sport in Berlin
