= Stadion An der Alten Försterei =

Sports stadium in Berlin, Germany

- Alte Försterei

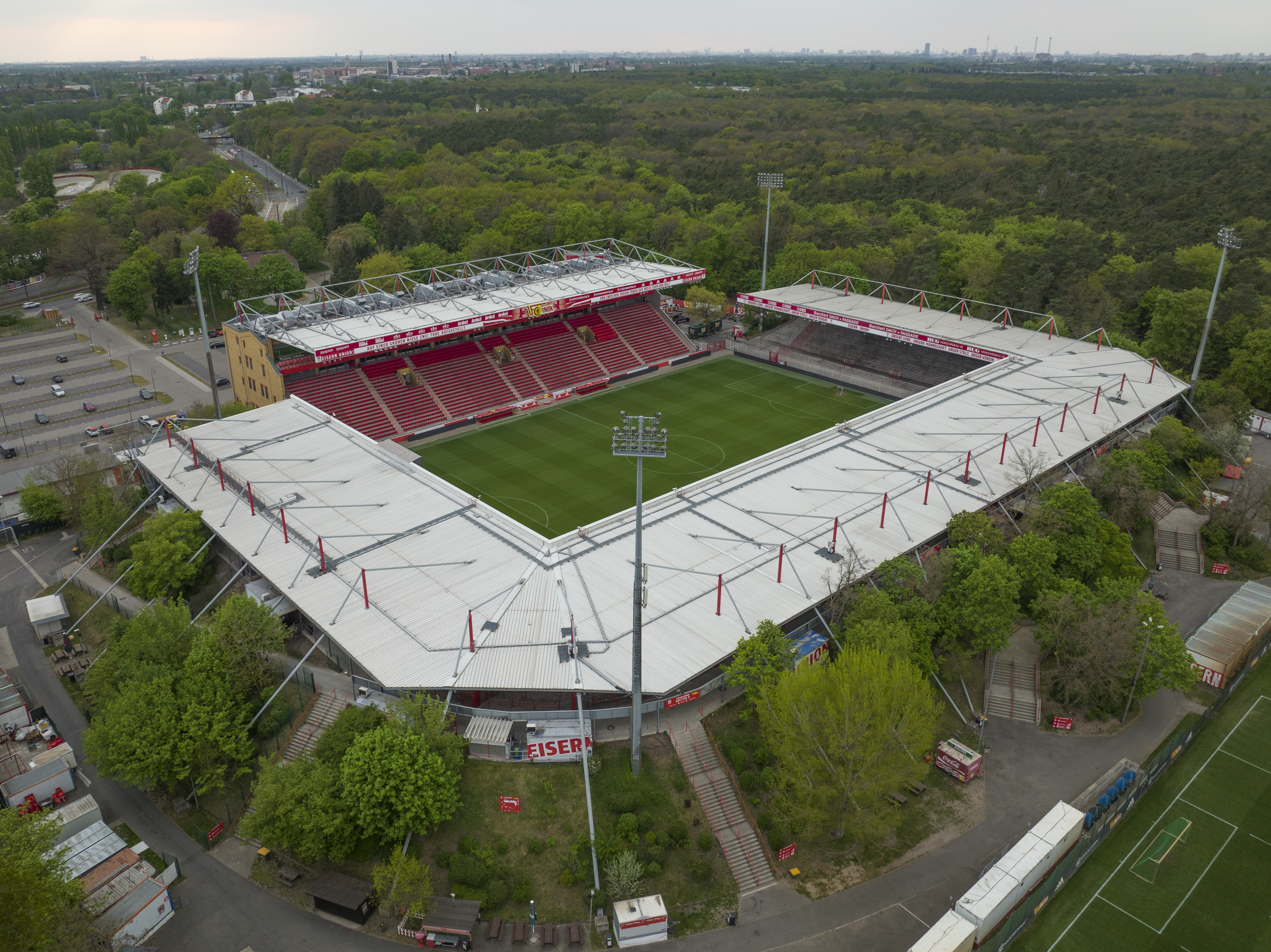
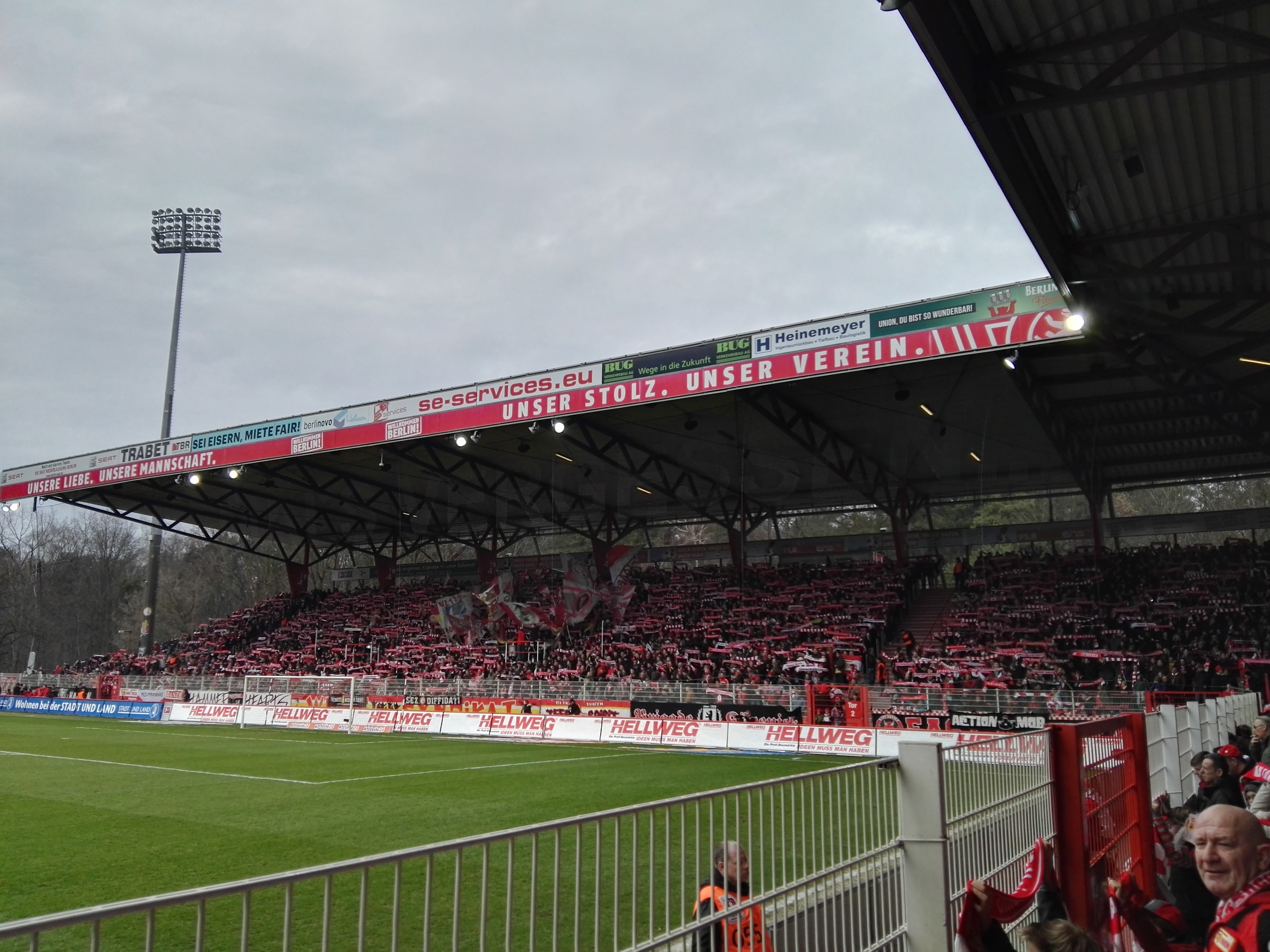
- Interactive map of Stadion An der Alten Försterei
- Former names: Sportplatz Sadowa
- Location: Köpenick, Berlin, Germany
- Coordinates: 52°27′26″N 13°34′05″E
- Owner: An der Alten Försterei Stadionbetriebs AG
- Capacity: 22,012 (football); 35,000 (concerts)
- Surface: Grass
- Scoreboard: Digital
- Record attendance: 22,012 (1. FC Union Berlin – FC St. Pauli, 17 October 2015)
- Field size: 109 × 73 m
- Acreage: 7,957
- Public transit: Berlin-Köpenick

Construction
- Opened: 7 August 1920
- Renovated: 1955, 2000, 2009
- Expanded: 1970, 1983, 2013

Tenants
- 1. FC Union Berlin (1920–present); Germany national football team (selected matches)

Stadion An der Alten Försterei (German pronunciation: [ˌʃtaːdi̯ɔn ʔan deːɐ̯ ˈʔaltn̩ fœʁstəˈʁaɪ̯]; English: Stadium at the old forester's house) is a football stadium in Köpenick and the largest single-purpose football stadium in the German capital of Berlin. It has been home to football club 1. FC Union Berlin since its predecessor SC Union Oberschöneweide started playing in the stadium in 1920.

The stadium's capacity was last redeveloped in 2009 and expanded in 2013. Some of the redevelopment work was carried out by over 2,300 Union Berlin supporters volunteering their services. During league matches the arena features a total capacity of 22,012. There are 3,617 seats available while the rest of the ground remains terracing.

The stadium became also known for events like the annual "Weihnachtssingen" (Christmas Carols Event) and the "WM-Wohnzimmer" (World Cup Living Room) in 2014.

== History ==
=== Opening ===
In 1920, SC Union Oberschöneweide had to find a new home ground in Berlin as its former pitch had been built over by developers with residential buildings. The club moved away from the city to the north-western part of the borough of Köpenick. The inaugural match at the new stadium was played on 17 March 1920 between Oberschöneweide and Viktoria 89 Berlin in a friendly. The new stadium was officially opened in August 1920 with a match between Oberschöneweide and the then German champions 1. FC Nürnberg.

=== Expansion ===
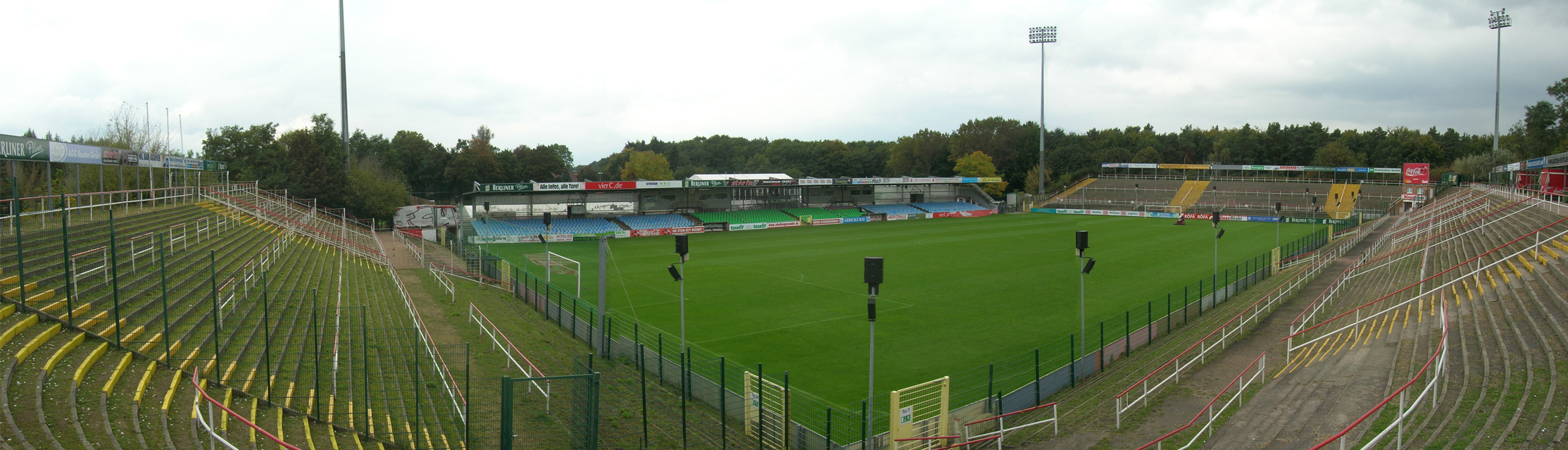
Architecture of the stadium from 1983 to 2008

In 1966, the stadium required expansion when Union won promotion to the DDR-Oberliga, the then top flight in East Germany. The stadium was first expanded in 1970 when the Gegengerade terrace was raised, while further extensions to the terracing at both ends in the late 1970s and early 1980s increased the capacity to 22,500. The stadium started showing signs of depreciation with the club unable to properly maintain the same as attendances went into a serious decline in common with the majority of clubs during the 1980s.

=== Post-reunification ===
After German reunification, Union were assigned to play in the 3rd league by the German Football Association with the outdated stadium proving to be one of the factors that hampered the club's push for promotion to higher leagues.

The terracing at the ground was in a poor state thereby reducing the capacity to 18,100 spectators. In the late 1990s, Union were only allowed to continue playing at the stadium on special temporary license until DFL stopped renewing these in 2006. The stadium was no longer eligible to stage any matches in the top three tiers of German football thereby forcing the club to redevelop the stadium or make a move to a different ground.

=== Redevelopment ===
==== Phase 1 ====
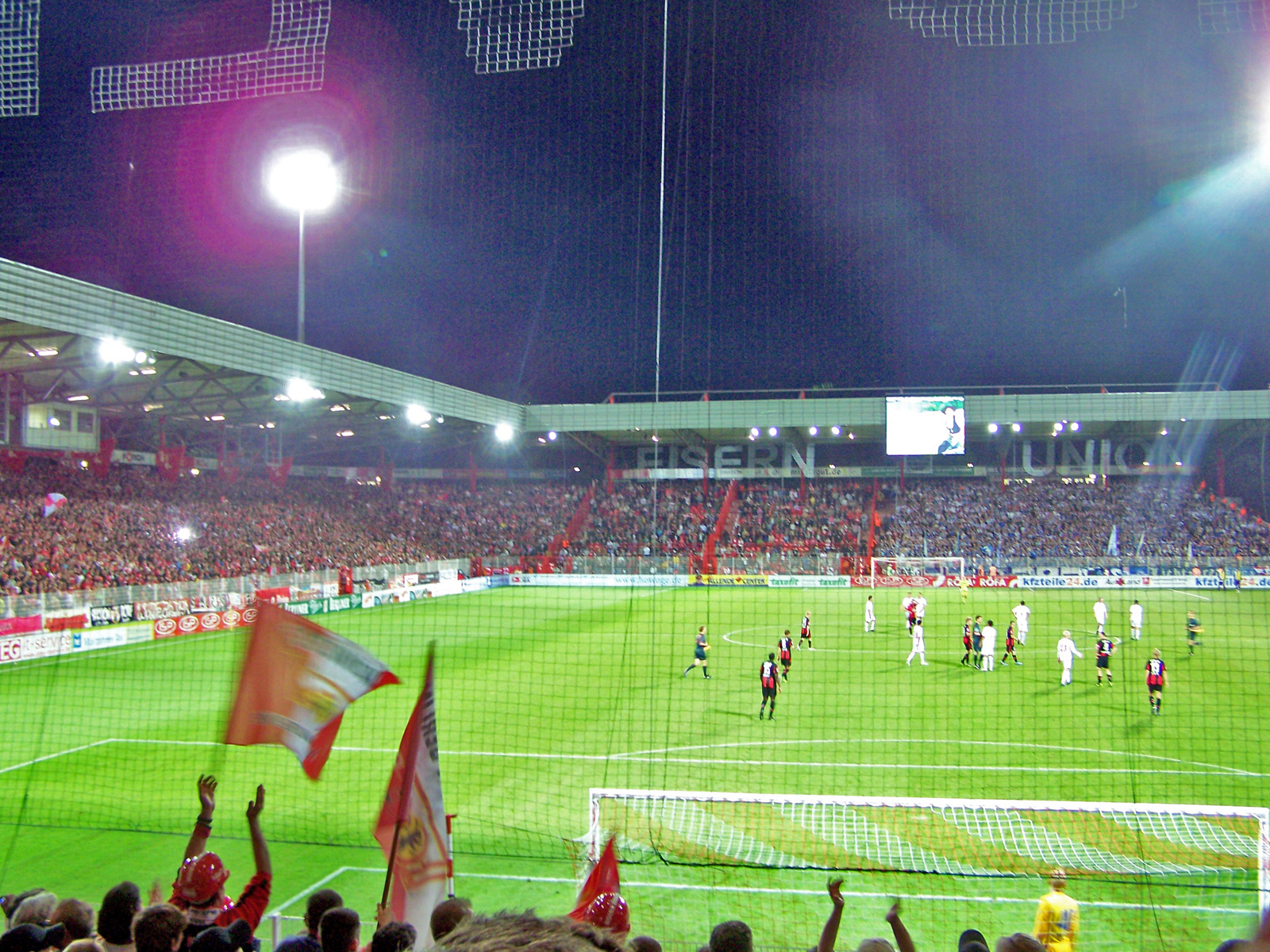
The stadium after redevelopment

In the late 1990s, the first plans for the redevelopment were drawn up. After several years of planning and discussion on various proposals, the redevelopment finally began at the end of the 2007–08 season. The major works included replacing the crumbling stone and cinder terracing with concrete terracing and installing a roof over the previously open terraces. Other minor improvements such as the installation of new perimeter fencing, new seats in the main stand and installation of undersoil heating and digital scoreboard were carried out. During the redevelopment, over 2,300 supporters volunteered their services with specialist firms undertaking complex tasks such as installing the cantilever roof.

Union Berlin played their home matches at the Friedrich-Ludwig-Jahn-Sportpark in Berlin's Prenzlauer Berg district during the 2008–09 season as the stadium was redeveloped. The stadium was re-opened on 8 July 2009 in time for a friendly against fellow Berlin side Hertha BSC.

==== Phase 2 ====
Originally planned for 2010, the second stage of refurbishment commenced when funding was secured in May 2012. The old main stand was torn down and the foundation-stone for the new, 3,617-capacity stand was laid in the following month. The new building is 100.5 m wide and 23.5 m high, also includes hospitality, media and other functional facilities. The cost for its construction was €15 million of which €2 million was contributed by the club with the sponsors accounting for €10 million. The remaining €3 million injected by a holding formed to own and manage to stadium, shares in which were made publicly available and over four thousand members of the club and sponsors bought shares in the company so formed.

Work on it was completed in the summer of 2013, when the fully renovated stadium was inaugurated with a friendly match between Union and Celtic F.C. The newly renovated stadium was sold out for the first time on 31 August 2013, when 21,717 spectators saw Union beat FC St. Pauli 3–2.

In 2023, the Försterei hosts Union Berlin's U19s in the UEFA Youth League as the first team hosts their UEFA Champions League games at Hertha Berlin's Olympiastadion due to UEFA requirements.

=== Future development ===
During the general assembly of October 2024, the club announced plans for the future of the An der Alten Försterei stadium. The stadium's capacity is set to increase to 40,500 seats. The main stand will be expanded to include an additional VIP area and media zone, while the three standing terraces will be replaced with two-tier seated stands. Construction work on the stadium itself will begin only after the completion of the Alte Försterei Training Center. The club management estimates the work will start in the summer of 2026. During the renovation, Union plans to temporarily move to the Olympiastadion.

== Events ==
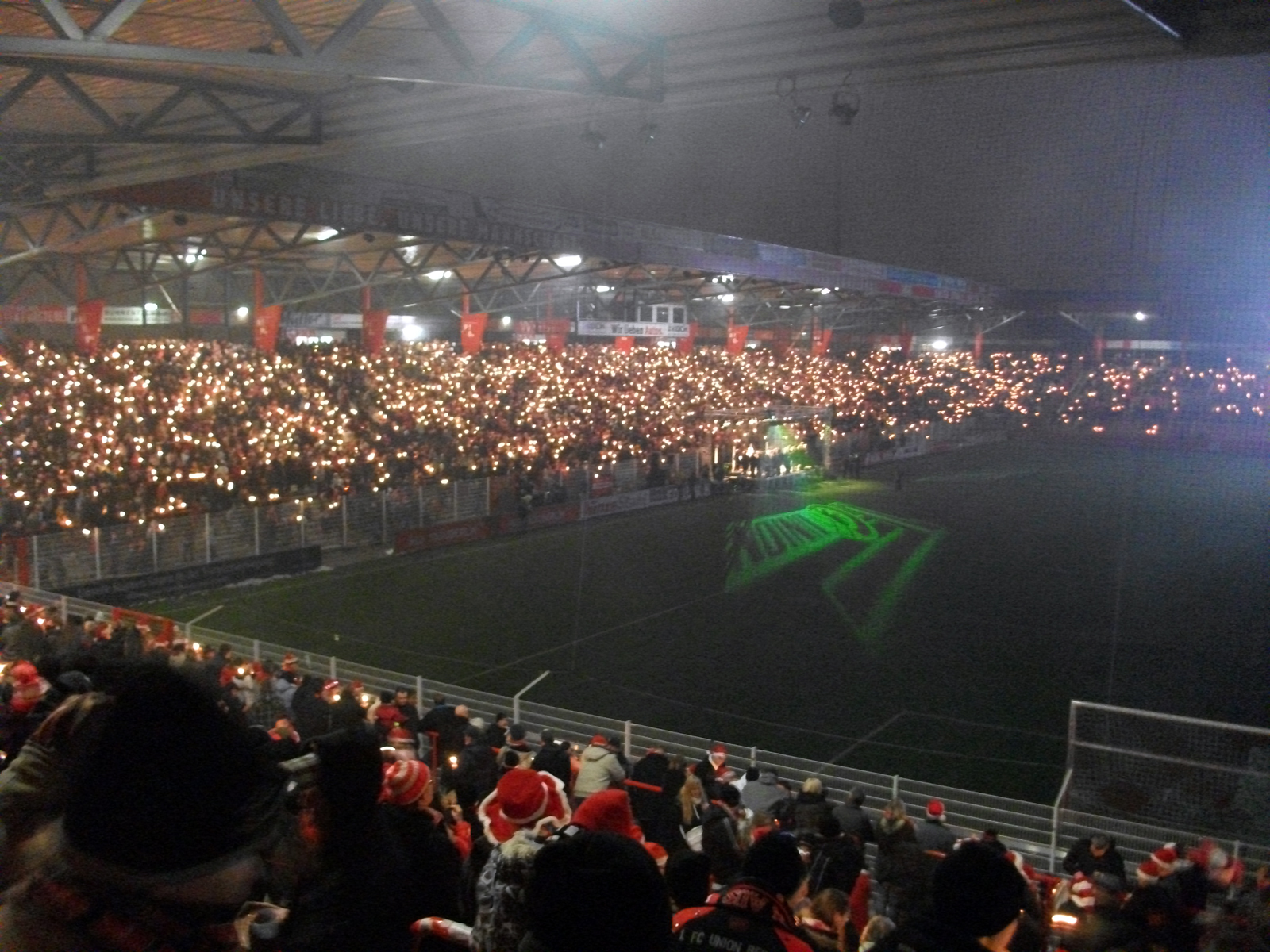
Christmas Carols Evening at the stadium

Since the redevelopment, the stadium has also been used for a small number of non-football events, among them rock concerts and bike shows.

=== Christmas Carols ===
In 2003 the yearly Union Weihnachtssingen (Christmas Carols Singing) started as an unofficial gathering to which just 89 fans showed up. In 2015, 28,500 people attended, including players and supporters of other teams from around Germany and Europe. Fans drink Glühwein, wave candles around, light flares and sing a combination of Christmas carols and football chants.

=== World Cup Living Room ===
In 2014 the club came up with the idea of inviting fans to take their own sofas to the ground for the whole of the World Cup. The event was called WM Wohnzimmer (World Cup Living Room). More than 800 sofas were placed on the pitch in rows in front of the big screen.

=== Concerts ===
On 3 September 2015, Linkin Park played the first ever music show in the stadium, performing in front of 35,000 fans.

== See also ==
- Football in Berlin
- Sport in Berlin
- Football in Germany
- List of football stadiums in Germany
- Lists of stadiums
