= 1998 German Masters =

Tournament information
- Dates: 8–13 December 1998
- Venue: Best Western Rheinhotel
- City: Bingen am Rhein
- Country: Germany
- Organisation: WPBSA
- Format: Non-ranking event
- Total prize fund: £110,000
- Winner's share: £25,000
- Highest break: John Parrott (ENG) (130)

Final
- Champion: John Parrott (ENG)
- Runner-up: Mark Williams (WAL)
- Score: 6–4

The 1998 German Masters was a professional non-ranking snooker tournament that took place between 8–13 December 1998 at the Best Western Rheinhotel in Bingen am Rhein, Germany.

Twelve players competed, 10 of the leading 11 in the world rankings, together with Steve Davis and Jimmy White. Ronnie O'Sullivan, ranked 3 in the world, did not compete. Matches were over 9 frames, except for the final which the best-of-11. Prize money was £110,000 with all players guaranteed a minimum of £5,000 for competing.

Tony Drago beat Stephen Hendry in the quarter-finals, his first win over Hendry in 13 attempts. John Parrott beat world number one, John Higgins, at the same stage. Parrott beat Mark Williams 6–4 in the final. Williams led 4–3 but Parrott won the next three to win the match. It was Parrott's first win since the European Open in March 1996. Parrott also won the £1,000 high break prize for a break of 130 in his semi-final match.

== Prize fund ==
The breakdown of prize money for this year is shown below:

- Winner: £25,000
- Runner-up: £16,000
- Semi-final: £10,000
- Quarter-final: £7,000
- Last 12: £5,000
- Highest break: £1,000
- Total: £110,000

== Main draw ==
Last 12; Best of 9 frames
John Parrott (ENG)	5
Jimmy White (ENG)	1
Stephen Lee (ENG)	5
Anthony Hamilton (ENG)	1
Alan McManus (SCO)	5
Steve Davis (ENG)	1
Peter Ebdon (ENG)	0
Tony Drago (MLT)	5

Quarter-finals; Best of 9 frames
John Higgins (SCO)	3
(England) John Parrott	5
Ken Doherty (IRL)	5
(England) Stephen Lee	3
Mark Williams (WAL)	5
(Scotland) Alan McManus	1
Stephen Hendry (SCO)	2
(Malta) Tony Drago	5

Semi-finals; Best of 9 frames
(England) John Parrott	5
(Republic of Ireland) Ken Doherty	1
(Wales) Mark Williams	5
(Malta) Tony Drago	2

Final; Best of 11 frames
(England) John Parrott	6
(Wales) Mark Williams	4

=== Final ===
Final: Best of 11 frames. Best Western Rheinhotel, Bingen am Rhein, Germany, 13 December 1998.
John Parrott; England	6–4	Mark Williams; Wales
0–85 (78), 64–32, 5–67 (67), 117–1 (75), 77–32, 0–106 (61), 0–95 (62), 63–39, 64–39, 79–0 (79)
79	Highest break	78
0	Century breaks	0
2	50+ breaks	4

== Century breaks ==
- 130, 114 – John Parrott
- 123 – Anthony Hamilton
