= Tempodrom =

Event venue in Berlin

- Neues Tempodrom
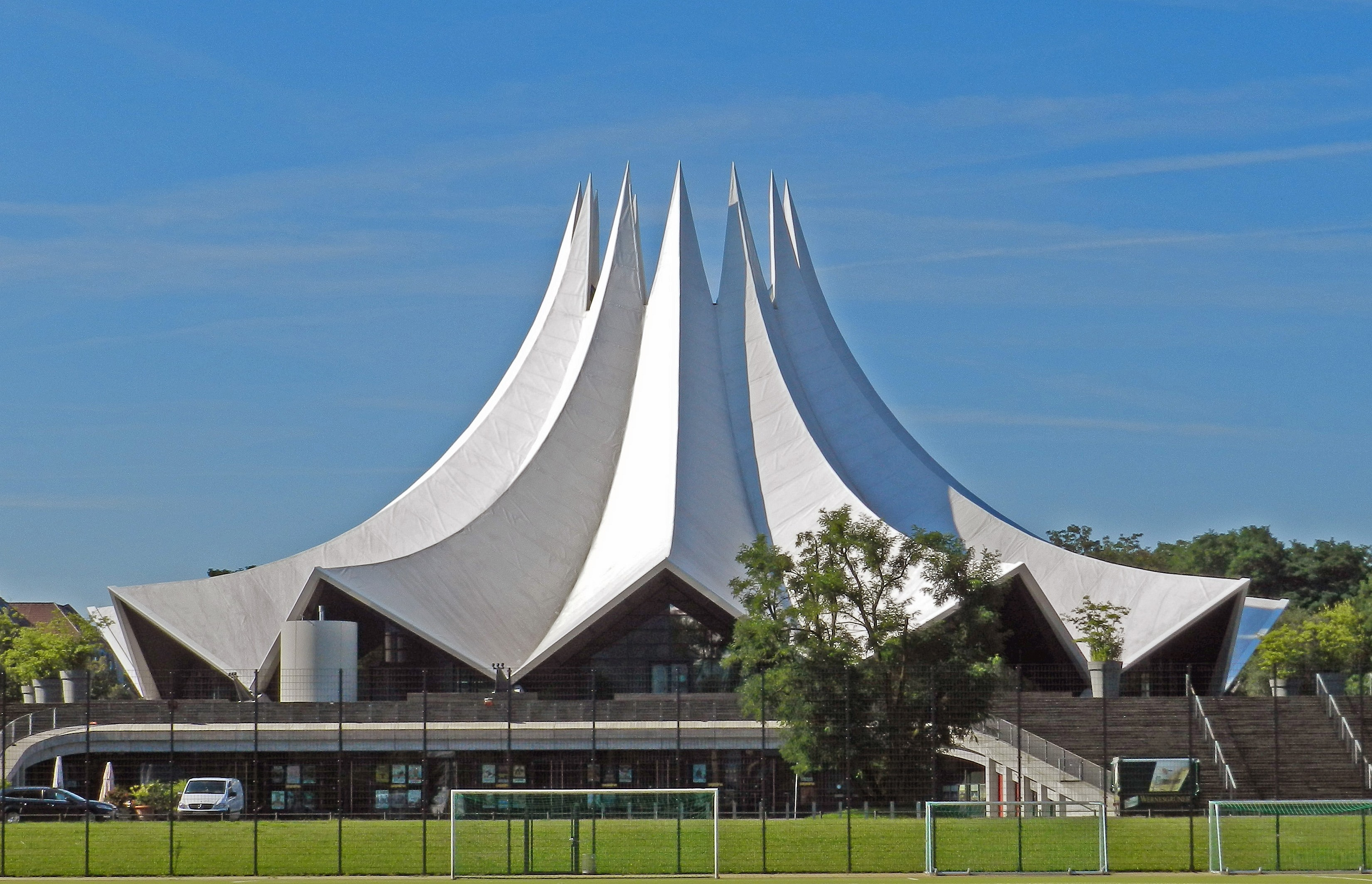
- Interactive map of Tempodrom
- Address: Möckernstraße 10; 10963 Berlin; Germany
- Location: Kreuzberg
- Coordinates: 52°30′06″N 13°22′52″E
- Owner: KPS-Gruppe
- Capacity: 3,500 (Big Arena); 400 (Small Arena)

Construction
- Opened: 1 May 1980
- Renovated: 1999–2001

Website
- Venue Website
- Building details

General information
- Groundbreaking: 21 May 2000
- Opened: 1 December 2001
- Inaugurated: 8 December 2001
- Relocated: 1985, 1999
- Renovation cost: DM 35.8 million ($25.3 million in 2021)

Renovating team
- Architect: Gerkan, Marg and Partners
- Structural engineer: Schlaich Bergermann Partner
- Civil engineer: Krentel
- Other designers: Energiesystemtechnik; Krupp Stahlbau; BeSB

The Tempodrom (also referred to as Neues Tempodrom) is a multi-purpose event venue in Berlin.

Founded by Irene Moessinger, it opened in 1980 next to the Berlin Wall on the west side of Potsdamer Platz, housed in a large circus tent. After several changes of location, it is now housed in a permanent building in the Kreuzberg neighborhood.

== History ==
Moessinger had recently become a nurse when she came into an 800,000-mark inheritance from her father; it was this bequest that she used to start the Tempodrom in a circus tent. Her initial funds were quickly exhausted, and the following year, the Berlin Senate agreed to contribute funds to keep the operation going.

The original location attracted noise complaints, and in 1985, the Tempodrom moved to a site in the Tiergarten, where it remained until displaced by construction of the new German Chancellery. At this time a new construction of the current building was proposed, and the tents moved to a temporary site during construction. In May 1999, the venue moved to another temporary location near the Ostbahnhof.

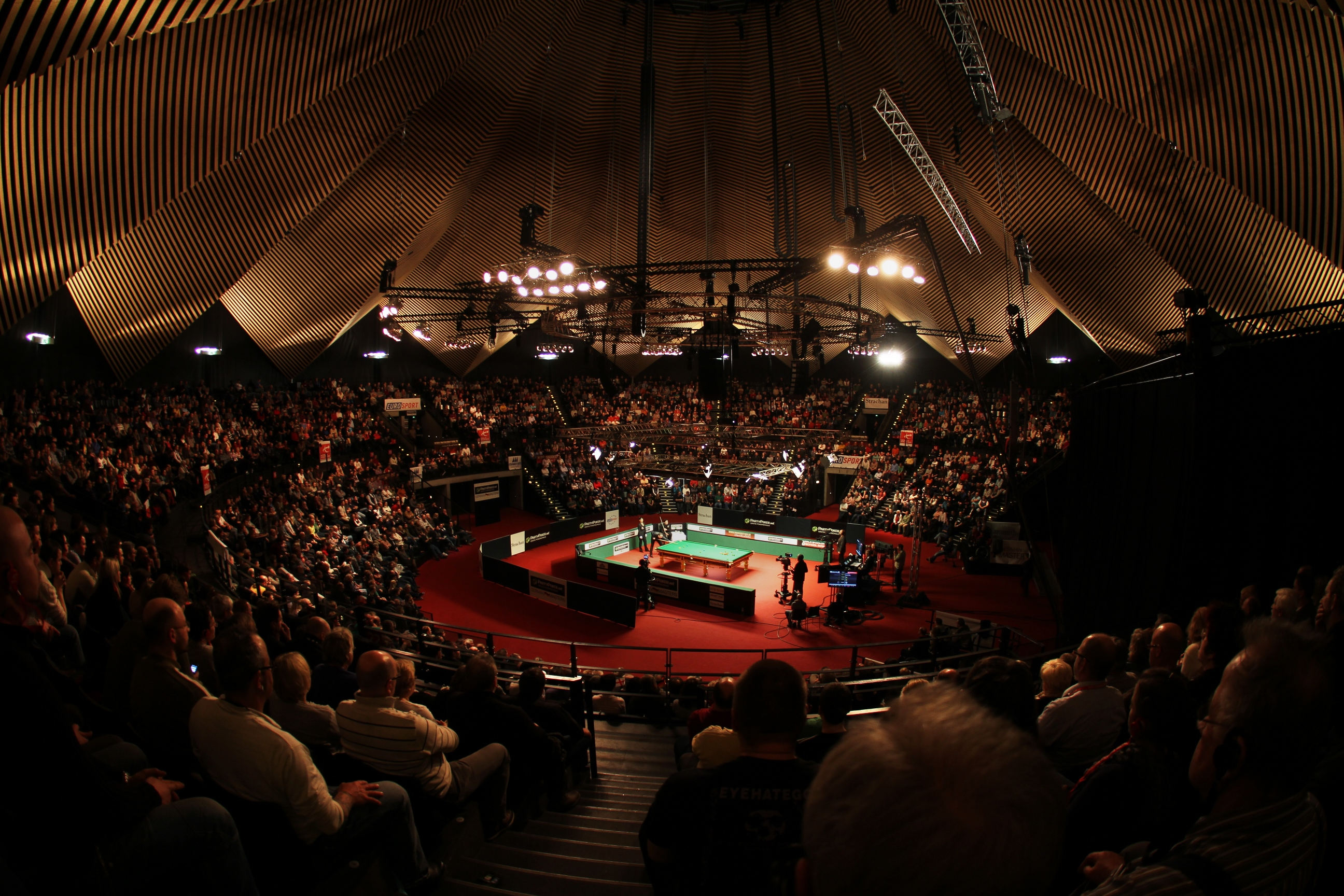
Interior of main arena as seen during the 2012 German Masters snooker tournament

In 2001, a permanent venue was finally constructed on the site of the old Anhalter Bahnhof, whose war-damaged ruins had been demolished in 1960. While a small section of the old station façade was retained (and is still standing), the entire train shed was removed, leaving a large open area. The new Tempodrom was erected in the center of this area, with a playing field lying between it and the façade remnant, and a wooded area extending in the other direction towards the Landwehr Canal. The firm of von Gerkan, Marg und Partner (GMP) was retained to design the new building. The basic floor plan is square, accommodating three performance spaces as well as a bistro and various offices and restrooms, underneath a wooden-floored terrace which hosts a beer garden in season. The two arenas are both circular, with the larger, centrally-located space covered by a 37-metre (121-foot) steel-and-concrete-panel roof intended to echo the form of the tents of the original site. This space can accommodate 3,500 patrons; the smaller arena seats 400. The third space is the "Liquidrom", a thermal bath/spa establishment featuring a 43-foot-diameter (13-metre) saltwater bath fitted with underwater speakers to provide a multi-sensory spa experience, three saunas at temperatures of 55, 80 and 90 °C, a steam bath room, and with various massage services. The 135,000-square-foot (12,500 m^{2}) building was completed in 2001 at a cost of nearly $36 million, over twice the original budget. Scandal over the overruns led to the resignation of State Senator Peter Strieder, who was in charge of the Urban Development department.

The Tempodrom corporation went into bankruptcy in 2005 and was operated by a receiver, with Moessinger retiring as director. She and former Director Norbert Waehl were tried for embezzlement but were acquitted in 2008. The Tempodrom is now operated by the Bremer KPS Group, who took over in April 2010 in the face of a foreclosure threat by Landesbank Berlin.

Tempodrom continues in operation and hosts a wide variety of events.

== Notable performers ==
- Alanis Morissette
- Amy Macdonald
- Amy Winehouse
- Annie Lennox
- Anastacia
- Backstreet Boys
- Bastille
- Björk
- Bloc Party
- Blur
- Celtic Woman
- The Cure
- Donna Summer
- Einstürzende Neubauten
- Erykah Badu
- Feist
- Fugazi
- Harry Styles
- Iggy Pop
- James Blake
- James Taylor
- Jamie-Lee
- Janet Jackson
- Joan Baez
- Josh Groban
- Keane
- Kylie Minogue
- Lorde
- Leona Lewis
- The Chuckle Brothers
- The Lumineers
- Marillion
- Massive Attack
- Matt White
- Monsta X
- Mr B The Gentleman Rhymer
- New Order
- Niall Horan
- Nick Cave and the Bad Seeds
- Nicki Minaj
- Norah Jones
- OMD
- Pet Shop Boys
- PinkPantheress
- Ramones
- Roger Hodgson
- Röyksopp
- Sasha Velour
- Severina
- Sigur Rós
- Snow Patrol
- Sparks
- Take That
- Tangerine Dream
- Tears for Fears
- Tori Amos
- Trevor Noah
- Troye Sivan
- Vanessa Mai
- Vanilla (group)
- Vasco Rossi
- Zara Larsson

== Notable events ==
- German Masters – Annual professional snooker tournament
