= 2015–16 1. FC Union Berlin season =

1. FC Union Berlin
2015–16 season
- Manager: Norbert Düwel (until 31 August 2015); Lewandowski (from 1 September 2015 to 4 March 2016); André Hofschneider (from 4 March 2016)
- Stadium: Stadion An der Alten Försterei
- 2. Bundesliga: 6th
- DFB-Pokal: First round
- Top goalscorer: League: Bobby Wood (17); All: Bobby Wood (17)
- Average home league attendance: 19,785
Home colours	Away colours	Third colours

The 2015–16 1. FC Union Berlin season was the 50th season in the football club's history. For the 6th consecutive season, Union Berlin played in the 2. Bundesliga, where they finished 6th. They also participated in this season's edition of the domestic cup, the DFB-Pokal, where they were eliminated in the first round by Viktoria Köln. The season covers a period from 1 July 2015 to 30 June 2016.

== Season summary ==
Union started the season poorly, picking up just four points from their first five games, and as a result, manager Norbert Düwel was sacked on 31 August 2015. Sascha Lewandowski was appointed as his replacement on 2 September 2015, and the club saw a gradual improvement in results, with the club in 13th place with 23 points from 19 games at the time of the winter break. However, due to health problems, Lewandowski stepped down as manager in March 2016, with André Hofschneider appointed as his replacement on a temporary basis. Union finished the season in 6th place on 49 points.

== Transfers ==
=== Transfers in ===
Date	Position	Name	From	Fee	Ref.
1 July 2015	LW	Maximilian Thiel	1. FC Köln	Undisclosed	
1 July 2015	LM	Kenny Prince Redondo	SpVgg Unterhaching	Free	
1 July 2015	CF	Collin Quaner	VfR Aalen	Free	
1 July 2015	RM	Adrian Nikçi	1. FC Nürnberg	Free	
1 July 2015	RB	Benjamin Kessel	Eintracht Braunschweig	Free	
1 July 2015	RM	Raffael Korte	Eintracht Braunschweig	Free	
1 July 2015	DM	Stephan Fürstner	SpVgg Greuther Fürth	Free	
1 July 2015	CM	Dennis Daube	FC St. Pauli	Free	
2 July 2015	CB	Denis Prychynenko	(Bulgaria) CSKA Sofia	Free	
6 July 2015	CF	Bobby Wood	TSV 1860 Munich	Undisclosed	
5 January 2016	CB	Emanuel Pogatetz	(United States) Columbus Crew	Free	
15 January 2016	GK	Jakob Busk	(Denmark) F.C. Copenhagen	Undisclosed	

=== Transfers out ===
Date	Position	Name	To	Fee	Ref.
30 June 2015	CB	Mario Eggimann	Retired		
30 June 2015	DM	David Hollwitz	Viktoria Berlin	Released	(Note: Hollwitz joined Viktoria Berlin following his release.)
30 June 2015	CM	Björn Jopek	Arminia Bielefeld	Released	(Note: Kopplin joined Preußen Münster following his release.)
30 June 2015	RB	Björn Kopplin	Preußen Münster	Released	(Note: Kopplin joined Preußen Münster following his release.)
30 June 2015	RM	Ahmed Waseem Razeek	1. FC Magdeburg	Released	(Note: Razeek joined 1. FC Magdeburg following his release.)
11 August 2015	CB	Oliver Oschkenat	Hamburger SV	Released	(Note: Oschkenat joined Hamburger SV following his release.)
1 January 2016	CF	Bajram Nebihi	Stuttgarter Kickers	Released	(Note: Nebihi joined Stuttgarter Kickers following his release.)
12 January 2016	CB	Denis Prychynenko	(Belgium) R.W.S. Bruxelles	Released	(Note: Prychynenko joined R.W.S. Bruxelles following his release.)

=== Loans in ===
Date from	Position	Name	From	Date until	Ref.
28 January 2016	CM	Felix Kroos	SV Werder Bremen	30 June 2016	

=== Loans out ===
Date from	Position	Name	To	Date until	Ref.
17 July 2015	CF	Nils Stettin	Viktoria Berlin	30 June 2016	

== Friendly matches ==
Pre-season match details
Date	Time	Opponent	Venue	Result F–A	Scorers	Attendance	Ref.
23 June 2015	18:00	SV Falkensee-Finkenkrug	Away (Note: Match played at Sportplatz Leistikowstraße)	8–1	Brandy 2', Korte 4', Parensen 10', Skrzybski 14', 83', Kreilach 33', Thiel 37', Daube 81'	2,000	
27 June 2015	17:00	MSV Neuruppin	Away (Note: Match played at Volksparkstadion)	10–1	Schönheim 12', Nebihi 17', Quaner 29', 52', Quiring 64', Kreilach 76', Brandy 77', 83', 90', Skrzybski 86'	1,200	
4 July 2015	17:30	Austria Klagenfurt	Away	1–2	Kreilach 63'	800	
9 July 2015	18:00	FK Austria Wien		0–1		600	
13 July 2015	18:30	Hallescher FC	Away	3–0	Kessel 15', Schönheim 53', Quaner 60'	2,582	
15 July 2015	18:30	Hapoel Tel Aviv	Home	2–0	Quaner 25', Skrzybski 53'	3,180	
18 July 2015	14:00	Crystal Palace	Home	2–0	Skrzybski 57', 89'	8,628	
1 September 2015	18:00	SV Lichtenberg 47	Away (Note: Hans-Zoschke-Stadion)	5–0	Nikçi 54', Brandy 68', Korte 83', 86', Nebihi 90'	1,100	
2 September 2015	19:00	SV Babelsberg 03	Away	4–1	Korte 17', Quaner 22', 25', Brandy 46'	2,006	
8 October 2015	19:30	FC Fredericia	Home	2–0	Quiring 60', Prychynenko 70'	318	
13 January 2016	12:00	Villarreal CF B	Home	0–1		350	
17 January 2016	11:00	Videoton	Home	0–1		250	
17 January 2016	15:00	Spain XI	Home	4–0	Skrzybski 20', Kahraman 67', Köhler 76', Redondo 86'	270	
24 January 2016	17:00	Borussia Dortmund	Home	1–3	Skrzybski 20'	22,012	
27 January 2016	14:00	SV Babelsberg 03	Home	3–1	Quaner 43', 86', Korte 48'	350	
30 January 2016	17:00	Austria Salzburg	Home	5–0	Skrzybski 4', Kroos 5', Wood 8', 51', Kreilach 47'	9,601	
24 March 2016	18:30	Hertha Zehlendorf	Away (Note: Match played at Ernst-Reuter-Sportfeld)	5–2	Collin Quaner 41', Redondo 64', 74', Kreilach 66', Brandy 82'	500	
16 May 2016	13:30	Preussen Eberswalde	Away (Note: Match played at Westend Stadion)	4–1	Haas 33', 43', Quaner 36', Koch 80'	1,187	
19 May 2016	18:30	VSG Altglienicke	Away (Note: Match played at Stadion Altglienicke)	0–4		709	
21 May 2016	17:00	Hansa Rostock	Away	3–1	Skrzybski 20', Quiring 67', 86'	8,500	

== Competitions ==
=== 2. Bundesliga ===
==== League table ====
Pos	Team	Pld	W	D	L	GF	GA	GD	Pts
4	FC St. Pauli	34	15	8	11	45	39	+6	53
5	VfL Bochum	34	13	12	9	56	40	+16	51
6	Union Berlin	34	13	10	11	56	50	+6	49
7	Karlsruher SC	34	12	11	11	35	37	−2	47
8	Eintracht Braunschweig	34	12	10	12	44	38	+6	46

Source: DFB
Rules for classification: 1) Points; 2) Goal difference; 3) Goals scored

==== Results summary ====
Overall								Home						Away					
Pld	W	D	L	GF	GA	GD	Pts	W	D	L	GF	GA	GD	W	D	L	GF	GA	GD
34	13	10	11	56	50	+6	49	9	6	2	32	20	+12	4	4	9	24	30	−6

==== Results by round ====
Round	1	2	3	4	5	6	7	8	9	10	11	12	13	14	15	16	17	18	19	20	21	22	23	24	25	26	27	28	29	30	31	32	33	34
Ground	H	A	H	A	H	A	H	A	H	A	H	H	A	H	A	H	A	A	H	A	H	A	H	A	H	A	H	A	A	H	A	H	A	H
Result	D	L	D	D	D	W	L	L	W	L	D	L	W	D	D	D	L	W	W	D	W	L	W	L	W	L	W	D	W	W	L	W	L	W
Position	7	12	13	13	14	10	13	13	12	13	13	15	14	14	13	13	15	14	13	13	12	13	9	11	9	10	8	9	7	6	6	6	7	6

A = Away; H = Home; W = Win; D = Draw; L = Loss

==== Matches ====
2. Bundesliga match details
Match	Date	Time	Opponent	Venue	Result F–A	Scorers	Attendance	Referee	Ref.
1	26 July 2015	15:30	Fortuna Düsseldorf	Home	1–1	Kessel 5'	20,786	Perl	
2	2 August 2015	15:30	SV Sandhausen	Away	3–4	Brandy 41', Kreilach 55', 71'	4,753	Siewer	
3	16 August 2015	13:30	1. FC Kaiserslautern	Home	2–2	Thiel 67', Wood 72'	20,149	Kempter	
4	23 August 2015	13:30	1860 Munich	Away	0–0		20,300	Schriever	
5	28 August 2015	18:30	RB Leipzig	Home	1–1	Brandy 25'	21,283	Ittrich	
6	12 September 2015	13:00	Karlsruher SC	Away	3–0	Kreilach 12', Wood 49', Quaner 77'	14,497	Thomsen	
7	20 September 2015	13:30	Greuther Fürth	Home	1–2	Skrzybski 17'	19,107	Jablonski	
8	23 September 2015	17:30	FSV Frankfurt	Away	2–3	Wood 39', Kessel 76'	5,011	Siewer	
9	26 September 2015	13:00	MSV Duisburg	Home	3–2	Wood 4', Brandy 31', Kreilach 45+1'	18,425	Storks	
10	4 October 2015	13:30	Eintracht Braunschweig	Away	1–2	Kessel 27' (pen.)	22,590	Stegemann	
11	17 October 2015	13:00	FC St. Pauli	Home	3–3	Zejnullahu 42', Thiel 45', Kessel 90+4'	22,012	Schröder	
12	24 October 2015	13:00	Paderborn 07	Home	0–2		18,521	Stieler	
13	31 October 2015	13:00	1. FC Heidenheim	Away	2–0	Kreilach 27', Skrzybski 59'	12,100	Storks	
14	7 November 2015	13:00	1. FC Nürnberg	Home	3–3	Wood 21', Skrzybski 54', Punčec 58'	21,552	Kampka	
15	20 November 2015	18:30	VfL Bochum	Away	1–1	Kreilach 37'	13,590	Cortus	
16	28 November 2015	13:00	Arminia Bielefeld	Home	1–1	Kessel 32'	20,314	Jablonski	
17	5 December 2015	13:00	SC Freiburg	Away	0–3		24,000	Perl	
18	12 December 2015	13:00	Fortuna Düsseldorf	Away	3–0	Wood 13', 69', Schmitz 86' (o.g.)	23,461	Brych	
19	18 December 2015	18:30	SV Sandhausen	Home	1–0	Daube 76'	18,026	Willenborg	
20	5 February 2016	18:30	1. FC Kaiserslautern	Away	2–2	Schönheim 76', Wood 86'	23,829	Petersen	
21	14 February 2016	13:30	1860 Munich	Home	3–0	Kroos 6', Wood 80', Kreilach 88'	18,332	Winkmann	
22	19 February 2016	18:30	RB Leipzig	Away	0–3		30,964	Brych	
23	26 February 2016	18:30	Karlsruher SC	Home	2–1	Kroos 45+1', Wood 60'	18,952	Osmers	
24	1 March 2016	17:30	Greuther Fürth	Away	0–2		7,960	Schmidt	
25	5 March 2016	13:00	FSV Frankfurt	Home	4–0	Kreilach 23', Wood 29' (pen.), 34', Trimmel 90+2'	18,173	Dietz	
26	12 March 2016	13:00	MSV Duisburg	Away	1–2	Wood 61' (pen.)	12,702	Heft	
27	18 March 2016	18:30	Eintracht Braunschweig	Home	3–1	Wood 58', Kreilach 69', 84'	19,026	Rohde	
28	1 April 2016	18:30	FC St. Pauli	Away	0–0		29,546	Steinhaus	
29	8 April 2016	18:30	Paderborn 07	Away	4–0	Wood 7', 13', Kreilach 21', Leistner 36'	9,137	Dietz	
30	17 April 2016	13:30	1. FC Heidenheim	Home	1–0	Wood 27'	19,634	Heft	
31	23 April 2016	13:00	1. FC Nürnberg	Away	2–6	Nikçi 3', Kreilach 23'	30,384	Thomsen	
32	29 April 2016	18:30	VfL Bochum	Home	1–0	Kessel 79'	20,036	Petersen	
33	8 May 2016	15:30	Arminia Bielefeld	Away	0–2		19,943	Steinhaus	
34	15 May 2016	15:30	SC Freiburg	Home	2–1	Nikçi 66', Quiring 78'	22,012	Dingert	

=== DFB-Pokal ===
DFB-Pokal match details
Round	Date	Time	Opponent	Venue	Result F–A	Scorers	Attendance	Referee	Ref.
First round	8 August 2015	15:30	Viktoria Köln	Away	1–2	Quaner 41'	4,540	Timo Gerach	

== Statistics ==
=== Appearances and goals ===
No.	Pos	Nat	Player	Total		2. Bundesliga		DFB-Pokal	
No.	Pos	Nat	Player	Apps	Goals	Apps	Goals	Apps	Goals
1	GK	(Germany) GER	Daniel Haas	21	0	20	0	1	0
2	MF	(Germany) GER	Christopher Quiring	17	1	6+11	1	0	0
3	DF	(Austria) AUT	Emanuel Pogatetz	11	0	9+2	0	0	0
4	DF	(Croatia) CRO	Roberto Punčec	23	1	19+4	1	0	0
5	DF	(Germany) GER	Benjamin Kessel	30	6	28+1	6	1	0
7	MF	(Germany) GER	Benjamin Köhler	2	0	2	0	0	0
8	MF	(Germany) GER	Stephan Fürstner	22	0	14+7	0	1	0
9	FW	(Germany) GER	Sören Brandy	31	3	23+7	3	1	0
10	MF	(Germany) GER	Dennis Daube	23	1	17+6	1	0	0
11	MF	(Germany) GER	Maximilian Thiel	16	2	15	2	1	0
12	GK	(Denmark) DEN	Jakob Busk	14	0	14	0	0	0
13	MF	(Germany) GER	Raffael Korte	9	0	4+4	0	0+1	0
14	MF	(Switzerland) SUI	Adrian Nikçi	9	2	4+5	2	0	0
15	FW	(United States) USA	Bobby Wood	32	17	30+1	17	1	0
18	MF	(Germany) GER	Kenny Prince Redondo	20	0	5+14	0	0+1	0
19	MF	(Croatia) CRO	Damir Kreilach	33	12	32	12	1	0
20	GK	(Germany) GER	Steve Kroll	0	0	0	0	0	0
21	FW	(Germany) GER	Collin Quaner	16	2	3+12	1	1	1
23	MF	(Germany) GER	Felix Kroos	12	2	12	2	0	0
24	FW	(Germany) GER	Steven Skrzybski	22	3	16+5	3	1	0
27	MF	(Germany) GER	Eroll Zejnullahu	26	1	23+3	1	0	0
28	DF	(Austria) AUT	Christopher Trimmel	27	1	20+6	1	1	0
29	DF	(Germany) GER	Michael Parensen	30	0	28+1	0	1	0
30	GK	(Morocco) MAR	Mohamed Amsif	0	0	0	0	0	0
31	MF	(Germany) GER	Cihan Kahraman	0	0	0	0	0	0
34	DF	(Germany) GER	Fabian Schönheim	8	1	8	1	0	0
36	MF	(Turkey) TUR	Leonard Koch	0	0	0	0	0	0
37	DF	(Germany) GER	Toni Leistner	26	1	24+2	1	0	0
39	MF	(Germany) GER	Lukas Lämmel	0	0	0	0	0	0
