= Felix Kroos =

German footballer

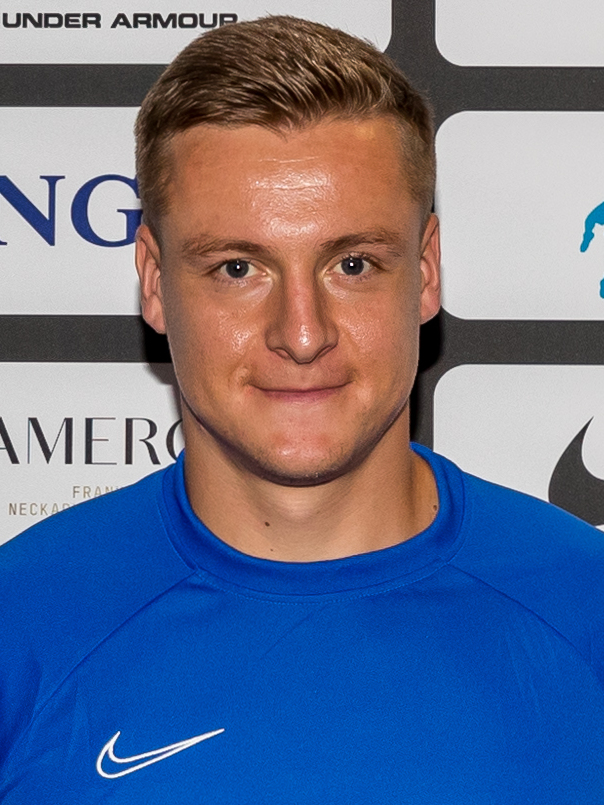
- Kroos in 2022

Personal information
- Date of birth: 12 March 1991 (age 35)
- Place of birth: Greifswald, Germany
- Height: 1.84 m (6 ft 0 in)
- Position: Midfielder

Team information
- Current team: Union Berlin (U-19 assistant)

Youth career
- 1997–2002: Greifswalder SV
- 2002–2008: Hansa Rostock

Senior career*
Years	Team	Apps	(Gls)
2008–2010	Hansa Rostock II	25	(4)
2009–2010	Hansa Rostock	27	(0)
2010–2013	Werder Bremen II	66	(11)
2010–2016	Werder Bremen	65	(1)
2016	→ Union Berlin (loan)	12	(2)
2016–2020	Union Berlin	98	(5)
2020–2021	Eintracht Braunschweig	32	(2)
Total		325	(25)

International career
2006–2007	Germany U16	8	(6)
2007–2008	Germany U17	10	(6)
2008–2009	Germany U18	10	(6)
2009	Germany U19	6	(2)
2011	Germany U21	1	(0)

Managerial career
- 2021–: Union Berlin (U-19 assistant)
- * Club domestic league appearances and goals

Felix Kroos (born 12 March 1991) is a German former professional footballer who played as a midfielder. He played for Hansa Rostock, Werder Bremen, Union Berlin, and Eintracht Braunschweig and represented Germany at international levels U16 through U21.

== Early and personal life ==
Kroos was born in Greifswald, Mecklenburg-Vorpommern; he was born five months after German reunification in what was once East Germany. His mother Britta was the East German champion in badminton, and his father Roland was a former footballer. His older brother Toni Kroos was also a footballer and midfielder, spending most of his career with FC Bayern Munich and Real Madrid and winning honours including the 2014 FIFA World Cup.

== Club career ==
=== Early career ===
Kroos began his career in 1997 at Greifswalder SC and was in summer 2002 scouted by Hansa Rostock. Kroos played for Hansa Rostock II for two seasons. Kroos made his professional debut in a third round German Cup match for Hansa Rostock against VfL Wolfsburg on 28 January 2009. He was substituted on in the 69th minute for Sebastian Svärd. Two days prior to the relegation of Hansa Rostock, Kroos announced his departure from the club.

=== Werder Bremen ===
Kroos signed a three-year contract for Werder Bremen on 15 June 2010. On 24 November 2010, he made his first-team debut during an away UEFA Champions League fixture against Tottenham Hotspur during which he gave away a penalty for a foul on Luka Modrić in a 3–0 loss. He finished the 2010–11 season with six matches played. He played in one match during the 2011–12. He made five appearances during the 2012–13 season. On 9 November 2013, he scored his first Bundesliga goal against Schalke 04 in an away match, which ended as a 3–1 defeat for Bremen. He finished the 2013–14 season with a goal in 20 matches played. He finished the 2014–15 season with 29 matches played. During the 2015–16 season, Kroos made nine appearances before moving to Union Berlin.

=== Union Berlin ===
Kroos was loaned out to Union Berlin on 28 January 2016. He joined the club permanently in June, reportedly for a transfer fee of €500,000 and a 20% share of a potential future transfer fee. He finished the 2015–16 season with two goals in 12 matches played for Union Berlin.

He scored his first goal for Union Berlin on 12 February 2017 in a 3–1 win over Arminia Bielefeld in the 2. Bundesliga, with a free kick. He finished the 2016–17 season with two goals in 31 matches played.

He finished the 2017–18 season with a goal in 30 matches played.

=== Eintracht Braunschweig ===
In September 2020, after his contract with Union Berlin expired, Kroos moved to 2. Bundesliga side Eintracht Braunschweig on a two-year contract. He retired from playing in July 2021.

== International career ==
Kroos played Germany's youth national teams at levels U16 through U21.

== Managerial career ==
On 26 November 2021, Kroos was appointed assistant coach of Union Berlin's U-19 side.

== Career statistics ==
Appearances and goals by club, season and competition
Club	Season	League			Cup		Continental		Other		Total		Ref.
Club	Season	Division	Apps	Goals	Apps	Goals	Apps	Goals	Apps	Goals	Apps	Goals	Ref.
Hansa Rostock II	2008–09	Regionalliga Nord	7	1	—		—		—		7	1	
Hansa Rostock II	2009–10	Regionalliga Nord	18	3	—		—		—		18	3	
Hansa Rostock II	Total		25	4	—		—		—		25	4	—
Hansa Rostock	2008–09	2. Bundesliga	16	0	1	0	—		—		17	0	
Hansa Rostock	2009–10	2. Bundesliga	11	0	—		—		1	0	12	0	
Hansa Rostock	Total		27	0	1	0	—		1	0	29	0	—
Werder Bremen II	2010–11	3. Liga	21	6	—		—		—		21	6	
Werder Bremen II	2011–12	3. Liga	25	4	—		—		—		25	4	
Werder Bremen II	2012–13	Regionalliga Nord	20	1	—		—		—		20	1	
Werder Bremen II	Total		66	11	—		—		—		66	11	—
Werder Bremen	2010–11	Bundesliga	5	0	0	0	1	0	—		6	0	
Werder Bremen	2011–12	Bundesliga	1	0	0	0	—		—		1	0	
Werder Bremen	2012–13	Bundesliga	5	0	0	0	—		—		5	0	
Werder Bremen	2013–14	Bundesliga	20	1	0	0	—		—		20	1	
Werder Bremen	2014–15	Bundesliga	26	0	3	0	—		—		29	0	
Werder Bremen	2015–16	Bundesliga	8	0	1	0	—		—		9	0	
Werder Bremen	Total		65	1	4	0	1	0	—		70	1	—
Union Berlin (loan)	2015–16	2. Bundesliga	12	2	0	0	—		—		12	2	
Union Berlin	2016–17	2. Bundesliga	29	2	2	0	—		—		31	2	
Union Berlin	2017–18	2. Bundesliga	29	1	1	0	—		—		30	1	
Union Berlin	2018–19	2. Bundesliga	25	2	1	1	—		1	0	27	3	
Union Berlin	2019–20	Bundesliga	15	0	1	0	—		–		16	0	
Union Berlin	Total		98	5	5	1	—		1	0	104	6	—
Eintracht Braunschweig	2020–21	2. Bundesliga	32	2	1	0	—		—		33	2	
Career total			325	25	11	1	1	0	2	0	339	26	—

== Honours ==
Individual

- 2007: Talent of the Year in Mecklenburg-Vorpommern
- Fritz Walter Medal: U18 Bronze Medal 2009
