= BLV =

BLV may refer to:

- BLV Verlag, a German publisher
- Bavarian Localbahn Society, a heritage railway operator
- Bovine leukemia virus
- Federal Office for Food Safety and Veterinary Affairs (German: Bundesamt für Lebensmittelsicherheit und Veterinärwesen), a Swiss federal agency
- Scott Air Force Base and MidAmerica St. Louis Airport, Belleville, Illinois (IATA code)
