= Hofschneider =

Hofschneider is a surname. Notable people with the surname include:

- André Hofschneider (born 1970), German footballer and manager
- Heinz Hofschneider (born 1957), American politician
- Jude Untalan Hofschneider (born 1970), American politician
- Marco Hofschneider (born 1969), German actor
