= 2000–01 Regionalliga =

7th season of the Regionalliga as a third-level league

Regionalliga
- Season: 2000–01
- Champions: 1. FC Union Berlin, Karlsruher SC
- Promoted: 1. FC Union Berlin, SV Babelsberg 03, Karlsruher SC, 1. FC Schweinfurt 05
- Relegated: SV Wilhelmshaven, FC Sachsen Leipzig, Lüneburger SK, Borussia Dortmund (A), Tennis Borussia Berlin, TSV 1860 München (A), SC Pfullendorf, FC Carl Zeiss Jena
- Top goalscorer: Daniel Teixeira – 32 (KFC Uerdingen 05 14 and 1. FC Union Berlin 18)

The 2000–01 season of the Regionalliga was the seventh season of the league at tier three (III) of the German football league system.

The Regionalliga was split into two divisions, the Regionalliga Nord and the Regionalliga Süd. The champions of each, 1. FC Union Berlin and Karlsruher SC, were promoted to the 2001–02 2. Bundesliga, along with northern runners-up SV Babelsberg 03 and southern third placed team 1. FC Schweinfurt 05. The southern runners-up, VfB Stuttgart II, was ineligible for promotion.

== Regionalliga Nord ==
=== Table ===
Pos	Team	Pld	W	D	L	GF	GA	GD	Pts	Promotion or relegation
1	1. FC Union Berlin (C, P)	36	21	10	5	62	23	+39	73	Qualification to 2001-02 UEFA Cup and Promotion to 2. Bundesliga
2	SV Babelsberg 03 (P)	36	19	11	6	57	41	+16	68	Promotion to 2. Bundesliga
3	VfB Lübeck	36	18	8	10	69	43	+26	62	
4	SC Fortuna Köln	36	18	8	10	58	42	+16	62	
5	SC Preußen Münster	36	17	10	9	66	50	+16	61	
6	SC Verl	36	15	10	11	53	46	+7	55	
7	FC Erzgebirge Aue	36	16	6	14	39	48	−9	54	
8	Eintracht Braunschweig	36	13	10	13	55	43	+12	49	
9	Dresdner SC	36	13	10	13	38	41	−3	49	
10	SV Wilhelmshaven (R)	36	12	12	12	55	55	0	48	Relegation to Oberliga
11	SG Wattenscheid 09	36	12	12	12	65	66	−1	48	
12	KFC Uerdingen 05	36	14	6	16	50	62	−12	48	
13	Rot-Weiss Essen	36	13	8	15	45	54	−9	47	
14	FC Sachsen Leipzig (R)	36	11	12	13	42	43	−1	45	Relegation to Oberliga
15	SV Werder Bremen (A)	36	12	9	15	49	53	−4	45	
16	Fortuna Düsseldorf	36	13	3	20	46	52	−6	42	
17	Lüneburger SK (R)	36	9	6	21	52	73	−21	33	Relegation to Oberliga
18	Borussia Dortmund (A) (R)	36	6	12	18	36	55	−19	30	Relegation to Oberliga
19	Tennis Borussia Berlin (R)	36	6	5	25	33	80	−47	23	Relegation to Oberliga

Source: fussballdaten.de
Rules for classification: 1) points; 2) goal difference; 3) number of goals scored.
(C) Champions; (P) Promoted; (R) Relegated

=== Top scorers ===
Goals	Nat.	Player	Team
32	(Brazil)	Daniel Teixeira	KFC Uerdingen 05 (14); 1. FC Union Berlin (18)
16	(Germany)	Jens Scharping	Lüneburger SK
16	(Germany)	Dirk Weetendorf	Eintracht Braunschweig
16	(Germany)	Carlos Castilla	SC Preußen Münster
15	(Germany)	Marco Küntzel	SV Babelsberg 03
15	(Germany)	Sascha Wolf	Rot-Weiss Essen
14	(Germany)	Daniel Bärwolf	VfB Lübeck
14	(Germany)	Marius Ebbers	SG Wattenscheid 09
13	(Albania)	Harun Isa	1. FC Union Berlin

== Regionalliga Süd ==
=== Table ===
Pos	Team	Pld	W	D	L	GF	GA	GD	Pts	Promotion or relegation
1	Karlsruher SC (C, P)	34	17	10	7	48	25	+23	61	Promotion to 2. Bundesliga
2	VfB Stuttgart (A)	34	16	10	8	57	38	+19	58	
3	1. FC Schweinfurt 05 (P)	34	16	9	9	57	43	+14	57	Promotion to 2. Bundesliga
4	SV Eintracht Trier 05	34	16	9	9	48	34	+14	57	
5	SV Darmstadt 98	34	15	8	11	46	39	+7	53	
6	Sportfreunde Siegen	34	14	8	12	45	45	0	50	
7	VfR Aalen	34	12	13	9	45	37	+8	49	
8	VfR Mannheim	34	12	9	13	50	45	+5	45	
9	FC Bayern München (A)	34	12	8	14	52	55	−3	44	
10	Kickers Offenbach	34	11	11	12	39	43	−4	44	
11	SV Wehen	34	12	8	14	41	49	−8	44	
12	SSV Jahn Regensburg	34	12	7	15	57	62	−5	43	
13	SV Wacker Burghausen	34	10	13	11	46	52	−6	43	
14	SV Elversberg	34	11	10	13	40	58	−18	43	
15	FC Rot-Weiß Erfurt	34	10	9	15	40	47	−7	39	
16	TSV 1860 München (A) (R)	34	8	13	13	49	63	−14	37	Relegation to Oberliga
17	SC Pfullendorf (R)	34	9	9	16	42	49	−7	36	Relegation to Oberliga
18	FC Carl Zeiss Jena (R)	34	7	8	19	39	57	−18	29	Relegation to Oberliga

Source: fussballdaten.de
Rules for classification: 1) points; 2) goal difference; 3) number of goals scored.
(C) Champions; (P) Promoted; (R) Relegated

=== Top scorers ===
Goals	Nat.	Player	Team
18	(Croatia)	Marko Barlecaj	SC Pfullendorf
16	(Italy)	Antonio Di Salvo	FC Bayern München (Amateure)
14	(Germany)	Danny Fuchs	TSV 1860 München (Amateure)
14	(Germany)	Michael Fersch	SSV Jahn Regensburg
12	(Turkey)	Berkant Göktan	FC Bayern München (Amateure)
12	(Ghana)	Joseph Aziz	SV Eintracht Trier 05
12	(Germany)	Michael Petry	VfR Mannheim
