= Norbert Düwel =

German football manager

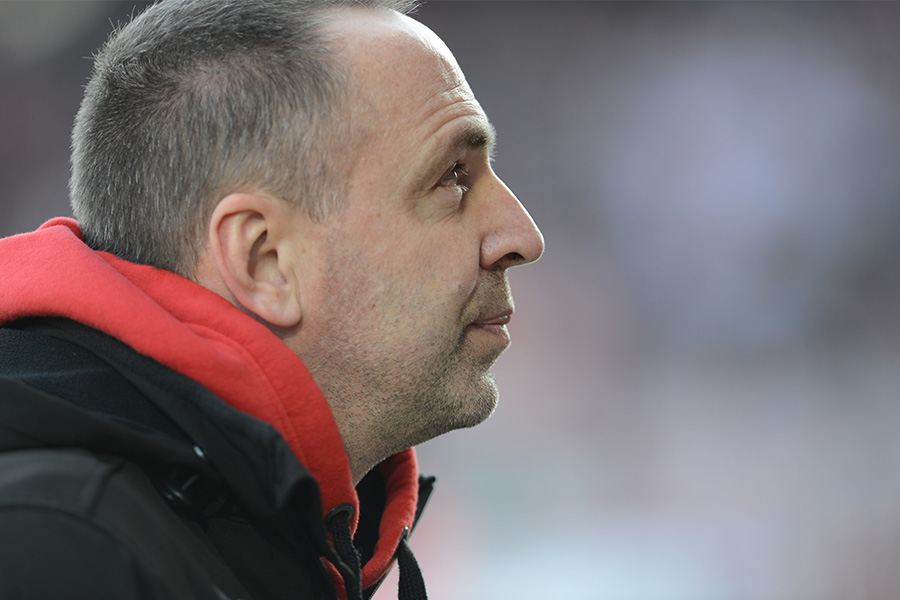
- Düwel in 2015

Personal information
- Date of birth: 5 January 1968 (age 58)
- Place of birth: Altötting, Germany
- Position: Forward

Senior career*
Years	Team	Apps	(Gls)
- Türk Gücü München
- Wacker Burghausen

Managerial career
- 2006–2007: TSV Gräfelfing
- 2007–2009: Deutschland Studentinnen
- 2010–2013: Hannover 96 (assistant)
- 2014–2015: 1. FC Union Berlin
- 2022: Laos (technical director)
- * Club domestic league appearances and goals

Norbert Düwel (born 5 January 1968) is a German football manager who managed Laos.

== Coaching career ==
In May 2014 it was announced that Düwel would replace Uwe Neuhaus as manager of Union Berlin. He was subsequently sacked on 31 August 2015. Union Berlin picked up four points from five matches to start the 2015–16 season. He finished with a record of 12 wins, 15 draws, and 14 losses.

== Coaching record ==
As of 31 August 2015

Team	From	To	Record					
Team	From	To	G	W	D	L	Win %	Ref.
Union Berlin	13 May 2014	31 August 2015	41	12	15	14	29.27	

== Bibliography ==
- Norbert Düwel: Richtig Frauenfußball, BLV Verlag, 2005 (127 pages), ISBN 978-3405167899
- Norbert Düwel: Dribbeln, Passen, Schießen - Profi-Tipps für Kids, BLV Verlag, 2007 (119 pages), ISBN 978-3835401310
