= Maximilian Thiel =

German footballer

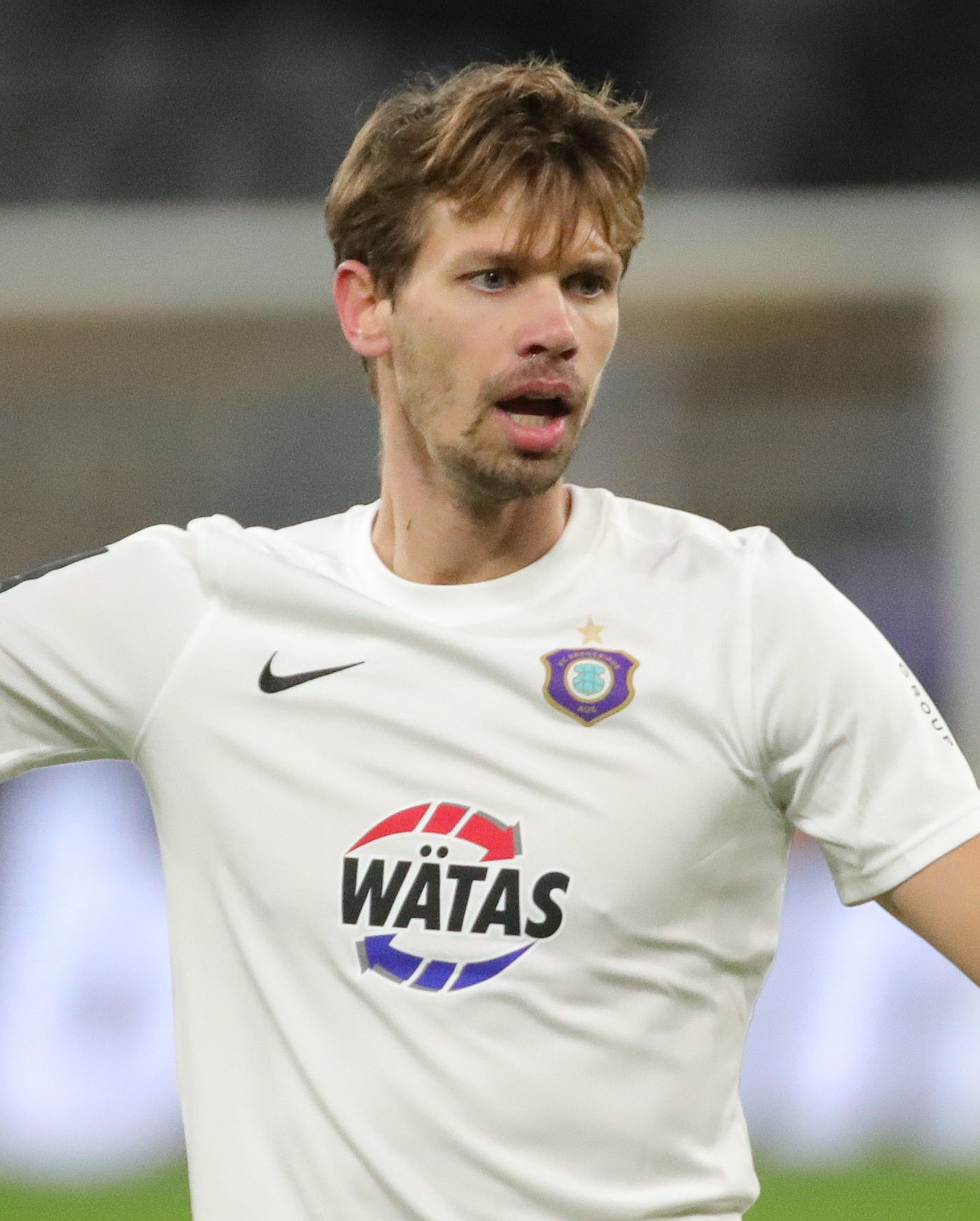
- Thiel in 2022

Personal information
- Date of birth: 3 February 1993 (age 33)
- Place of birth: Altötting, Germany
- Height: 1.87 m (6 ft 2 in)
- Positions: Midfielder; winger

Youth career
- 1998–2004: SV Gendorf Burgkirchen
- 2004–2011: Wacker Burghausen

Senior career*
Years	Team	Apps	(Gls)
2010–2013	Wacker Burghausen	76	(14)
2013–2014	1. FC Köln	5	(0)
2013–2014	→ 1. FC Köln II	8	(2)
2014–2017	Union Berlin	34	(7)
2017–2021	1. FC Heidenheim	47	(6)
2021–2022	SV Wehen Wiesbaden	32	(8)
2022–2024	Erzgebirge Aue	54	(3)

International career^{‡}
2013–2014	Germany U20	9	(4)
- * Club domestic league appearances and goals as of 22 May 2024 ‡ National team caps and goals as of 5 March 2014

Maximilian "Maxi" Thiel (born 3 February 1993) is a German professional footballer who plays as a midfielder or winger.

== Club career ==
=== Wacker Burghausen ===
A product of the Wacker Burghausen youth academy, Thiel made his professional debut in August 2010 at the age of 17 in the 3. Liga against Rot Weiss Ahlen under coach Mario Basler. In October of the same year he signed his first professional contract. In the following years he developed into a regular then a key player and eventually into one of the most sought-after talents of the 3. Liga. He made a total 76 appearances for the club.

=== 1. FC Köln ===
At the start of the 2013–14 season Thiel moved to then 2. Bundesliga team 1. FC Köln and at the end of the season the club won the league championship and got promoted to the Bundesliga.

=== Union Berlin ===
During the summer transfer window in 2014 he moved to Union Berlin on loan. Thiel established himself in the starting line-up instantly and evolved into a key player. After a successful one-year loan deal, Union Berlin signed him on a two-year contract until 2017. In October 2015, he was appointed as vice-captain and made a member of the team committee.

In February 2016, he sustained an injury which kept him out of action for a long time. In his time at the club, he played 33 matches scoring 7 goals and assisting 7 times.

=== 1. FC Heidenheim ===
In May 2017, Thiel's signing of a two-year contract was announced by league rivals 1. FC Heidenheim.

=== SV Wehen Wiesbaden ===
In July 2021, Thiel was signed by 3. Liga side SV Wehen Wiesbaden on a one-year deal.

== International career ==
Thiel has been capped for Germany national under-20 team nine teams, scoring four goals.

== Style of play ==
At the beginning of his career Thiel played more as a central midfielder, before switching onto the wing where he now plays as a left winger. Besides his good technique and pace, the left-footed attacker is known for his powerful shot.
