= Harald Seeger =

East German footballer and manager

Personal information
- Date of birth: 1 April 1922
- Place of birth: Brandenburg an der Havel, Germany
- Date of death: 18 May 2015 (aged 93)
- Place of death: Wandlitz, Germany
- Position: Forward

Managerial career
- Years: Team
- 1967–1969: East Germany
- 1970–1972: 1. FC Union Berlin

Harald Seeger (1 April 1922 – 18 May 2015) was an East German footballer and manager.
