= Daniel Teixeira =

Brazilian footballer (born 1968)

Personal information
- Full name: Daniel Lourenço Teixeira
- Date of birth: 20 April 1968 (age 58)
- Place of birth: Belo Horizonte, Brazil
- Height: 1.83 m (6 ft 0 in)
- Position: Striker

Senior career*
Years	Team	Apps	(Gls)
1989–1993	Cruzeiro		
1991–1992	→ Nippon Denso (loan)		
1994	Nacional	4	(0)
1994–1996	Camacha		
1996–1997	Machico	26	(6)
1997–1998	Seixal	27	(18)
1998–1999	Vila Nova		
1999–2001	KFC Uerdingen 05	50	(36)
2001	Union Berlin	16	(18)
2001–2003	Eintracht Braunschweig	49	(23)
2003–2004	Holstein Kiel	28	(17)
2004–2005	Rot-Weiss Essen	13	(2)
2005–2007	Union Berlin	50	(29)
- * Club domestic league appearances and goals

Daniel Teixeira (born 20 April 1968) is a Brazilian former footballer who played as a striker. After spending the initial years of his career in his native Brazil, Japan, and Portugal, he moved to Germany in 1999. In Germany, he became a prolific goalscorer in the lower divisions, and also spent two seasons in the 2. Bundesliga.
