= BLV Verlag =

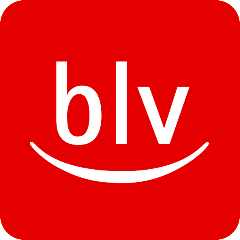
- Founded: 1946
- Country of origin: Germany
- Headquarters location: Munich
- Official website: blv.de

The BLV Verlag is a how-to book publisher in Germany. The program includes over 600 titles, to which about 120 new books published annually. Main topic areas are the garden and nature, sports, fitness, cooking and DIY. BLV-books are almost exclusively original editions, licenses are sold in all European countries, the United States and in countries of the Asian continent.

== History ==
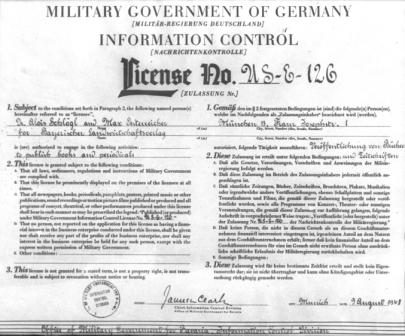
BLV's Working license

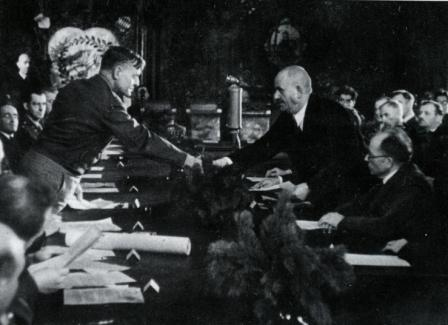
Handover of the working license through the US military government

The company was founded in 1946 as the "Bayerischer Landwirtschaftsverlag" by the Bavarian Farmers' Association. The Bavarian Farmers Association has been the main shareholder of the publisher since then. Beginning with the US military government allowing them "to publish books and periodicals", since the association wanted to support its farmers and rural women with technical literature during the reconstruction time after the war. Therefore, different agricultural pages and textbooks appeared in rapid succession. The BLV developed from agricultural publisher to trade publisher in the 1950s: in 1955, with the first published cookbook "Ich helfe Dir kochen" from Hedwig Maria Stuber which sold 100,000 copies in the first year and has now sold about 3.5 million times, followed by books for hunting and the first mountain tour books by Walter Pause or the South Tyrol-illustrated books by Sepp Schnürer.

== Publisher program ==
Given the growing importance of the publishing outside Bavaria and the ever expanding publishing program, the company was renamed to the "BLV Verlagsgesellschaft mbH, Munich" in 1969. In the 1970s, the publisher made contact with Reinhold Messner and published many of his books since then. At the same time, an extensive sports book program was created, which was gradually expanded with fitness and wellness titles.

As of the 1970s, the gardening became a main focus. The range of how to book grew to be based on all aspects of ornamental and vegetable garden.

Nature is another topic of the publisher: Since 1988, the Nature book program "Der BLV Tier- und Pflanzenführer" from Wilhelm Eisenreich, Alfred Handel and Ute E. Zimmer appeared. The book has now sold more than three million copies.

In 2001, the BLV business divisions were divided into two companies: All magazines are published by the Deutscher Landwirtschaftsverlag (dlv) and BLV Buchverlag publishes exclusively books.
