= André Hofschneider =

German footballer (born 1970)

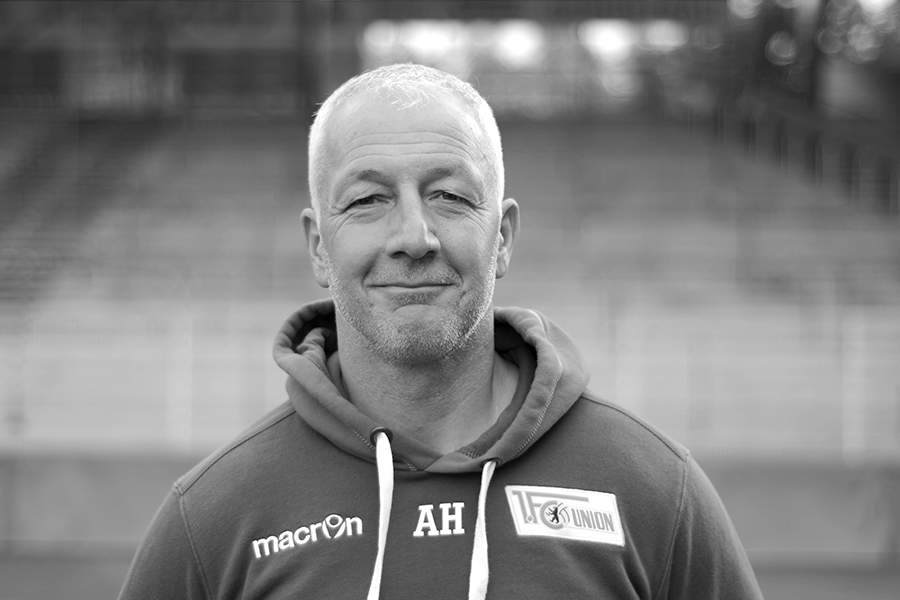
- Team photo 2015/16

Personal information
- Date of birth: 10 June 1970 (age 56)
- Place of birth: East Berlin, East Germany
- Height: 1.88 m (6 ft 2 in)

Senior career*
Years	Team	Apps	(Gls)
1988–1989	Union Berlin	6	(0)
1994–1997	Hansa Rostock	58	(0)
1997–1998	1860 Munich	12	(0)
1998–2002	Arminia Bielefeld	79	(1)
2002–2004	FC Augsburg	28	(0)
Total		183	(1)

Managerial career
- 2016: Union Berlin (interim)
- 2016: Union Berlin
- 2017–2018: Union Berlin
- * Club domestic league appearances and goals

André Hofschneider (born 10 June 1970) is a German football former player who last managed Union Berlin.
