= 1. FC Union Berlin =

Association football club in Germany

Union Berlin
- Full name: 1. Fußballclub Union Berlin e. V.
- Nickname: Die Eisernen (The Iron Ones)
- Founded: 20 January 1966; 60 years ago (preceded by FC Olympia Oberschöneweide, founded 1906)
- Ground: Stadion An der Alten Försterei
- Capacity: 22,012
- President: Dirk Zingler
- Head coach: Mauro Lustrinelli
- League: Bundesliga
- 2025–26: Bundesliga, 11th of 18
- Website: fc-union-berlin.de
Home colours	Away colours	Third colours

1. Fußballclub Union Berlin e. V., commonly known as Union Berlin (pronounced [ˈeːɐ̯stɐ ʔɛfˈt͡seː ʔuˈni̯oːn bɛʁˈliːn]), is a professional German football club based in Berlin.

The club's origins can be traced to 1906, when its predecessor FC Olympia Oberschöneweide was founded. During the Cold War, Union was based in East Berlin, joining the German league structure upon the reunification of the country in 1990. From 2009 until 2019, they competed in the 2. Bundesliga, the second tier of German football. In 2019, Union won promotion to the Bundesliga for the first time in the club's history. In 2021, Union finished seventh in the league to qualify to the inaugural UEFA Europa Conference League. In 2022, the club qualified for the UEFA Europa League by finishing fifth. The following season, the club qualified for the Champions League for the first time in their history, by finishing fourth in the Bundesliga.

The home ground of the club is the Stadion An der Alten Försterei. It is the second-largest in the German capital and has been home to Union Berlin and its forerunners since it opened in 1920. The stadium also hosts concerts and the annual Weihnachtssingen Christmas carols event.

As of 30 June 2026, Union Berlin has 72,172 official members. The club has become well known for its enthusiastic and creative fan base and its chant "Eisern Union" (Iron Union).

== History ==
=== First foundation (1906–1945) ===
The name 1. FC Union Berlin was used by two football clubs that shared a common origin as FC Olympia Oberschöneweide, founded in 1906 in Oberschöneweide, which at that time was a suburb of Berlin. The side took on the name SC Union 06 Oberschöneweide in 1910. Union was one of Berlin's premier clubs in the interwar period, regularly winning local championships and competing at the national level, including an appearance in the 1923 German championship final which they lost 0–3 to Hamburger SV.

Early on, the team was nicknamed "Schlosserjungs" (English: metalworker-boys) because of their then all blue kit, reminiscent of the typical work clothing worn in the factories of the industrial Oberschöneweide district. The popular cry of Union supporters – "Eisern Union!" (Iron Union) – also emerged at this time. Since its foundation the club has had a distinct working-class image, in contrast to other local clubs with more middle-class origins, such as Viktoria 89 Berlin, Blau-Weiß 90 Berlin, BSV 92 Berlin or Tennis Borussia Berlin.

In 1933, German football was reorganized under the Third Reich into 16 top-flight divisions known as Gauligen. Oberschöneweide became part of the Gauliga Berlin-Brandenburg, where they generally earned middling, unexceptional results. They were relegated in 1935 and returned to first division play in 1936 after only one season's absence. In 1940, the team finished first in Group B of the division and then defeated Blau-Weiß 90 (1–2, 3–0) to win the overall division title. That advanced the club to the national playoffs where they were put out by Rapid Wien in the opening group round (2–3, 1–3). Union resumed its place as an average side. They were relegated again in 1942 and played the final war-shortened Gauliga season in 1944–45.

=== Dissolution and split (1945–1961) ===
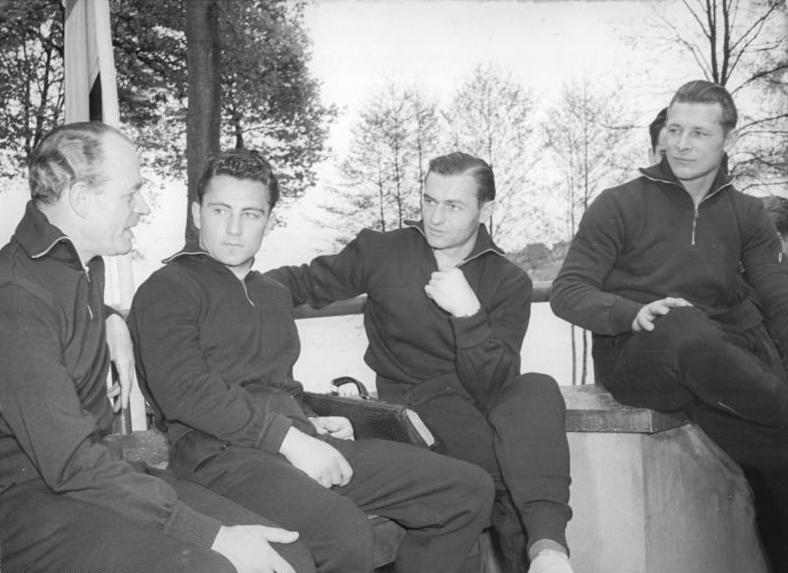
Coach Hanne Sobek (left) in 1955.

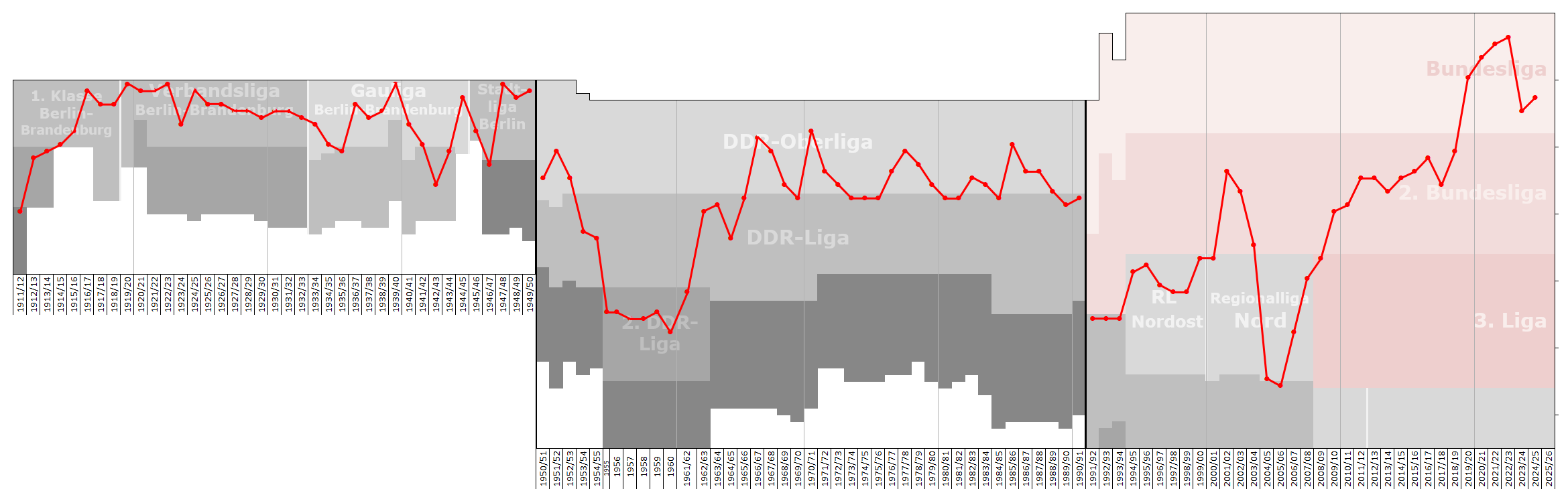
Historical chart of Union Berlin league performance

After World War II, occupying Allied authorities ordered the dissolution of all organizations in Germany, including sports and football associations. A new sport community called SG Oberschöneweide was formed in late 1945 and it played in the City League organized immediately after the war which had four regional departments. The team did not qualify to the newly created Oberliga Berlin (I) in 1946 after a poor season, but was promoted in 1947, won the division title right away and regained club status as SG Union Oberschöneweide during 1948–49.

The club finished the 1949–50 season in second place in Berlin and qualified to take part in the national final rounds. However, escalating Cold War tensions led Soviet authorities to refuse the team permission to travel to take part. Two Union teams then emerged as most players and coaches emigrated west to form Sport-Club Union 06 Berlin which took part in the scheduled playoff match in Kiel against Hamburger SV, losing 0–7.

The players remaining in the east carried on as SG Union Oberschöneweide while a number of players who had emigrated west to form SC organized a third side called Berliner Ballspiel-Club Südost. The western team was a strong side until the construction of the Berlin Wall in 1961, drawing huge crowds to matches in the Olympiastadion. The division of the city led to a change of fortunes for BBC Südost which plays today in the lower divisions before meagre crowds.

=== Restart as Union Berlin (1961–1990) ===
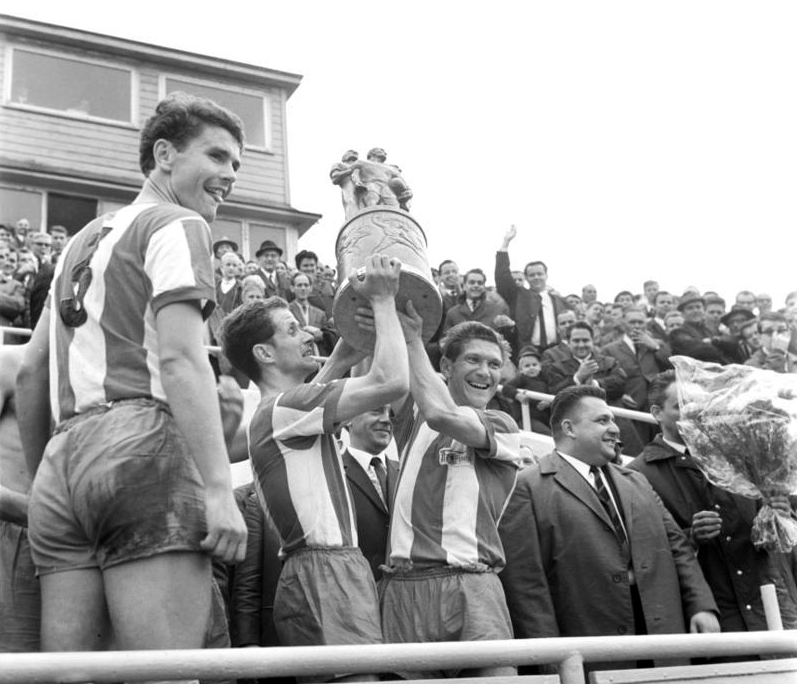
Ulrich Prüfke (captain) and Ralph Quest raise the FDGB Pokal trophy in 1968.

The eastern branch of the club went through a number of name changes: Union Oberschöneweide (1950), BSG Motor Oberschöneweide (1951), SC Motor Berlin (1955), TSC Oberschöneweide (1957), TSC Berlin (1963) – finally becoming the football club 1. FC Union Berlin in 1966.

1. FC Union Berlin was founded during the reorganization of East German football in December 1965 and January 1966, when ten dedicated football clubs were created. However, the football department of TSC Berlin was originally not taken into account. Only two clubs were planned for East Berlin, to be formed from the football departments of ASK Vorwärts Berlin and SC Dynamo Berlin. This was already contrary to the original plan, which had envisioned only one football club per district. And the football department of TSC Berlin was only playing in the second tier DDR-Liga at the time.

1. FC Union Berlin was founded on the initiative of the powerful Herbert Warnke. Herbert Warnke was the chairman of the state-controlled national trade union FDGB and a member of the SED Politburo. Another SED politician and Politburo member who pushed for the founding of 1. FC Union Berlin was the SED First Secretary in East Berlin Paul Verner. Both ASK Vorwärts Berlin and SC Dynamo Berlin were associated with the armed organs (German: Bewaffnete Organe der DDR). Warnke therefore argued for the creation of a third "civilian club" for the working people in East Berlin. He would become a passionate fan of 1. FC Union Berlin and a sponsoring member of the club.

1. FC Union Berlin was established in the middle of one of the largest industrial centers in East Germany. 1. FC Union Berlin was initially supported by the FDGB. The intention of the SED to win the support from FDGB for 1. FC Union Berlin was likely well thought out. The FDGB unified all workers in East Germany and therefore was most likely to carry the proper identity for a club of the working people. The club was founded in a ceremony in the clubhouse of VEB Transformatorenwerk Oberschöneheide "Karl Liebknecht" (TRO) in Oberschöneweide on 20 January 1966. The founding of the club was organized by the then-SED First Secretary in Köpenick, Hans Modrow. Like Herbert Warnke, Hans Modrow would be a sponsoring member of the club. SED Politburo member Paul Verner held a speech at the inaugural meeting. SED Politburo member Verner would be a very strong sympathizer of the club.

1. FC Union Berlin was the only football club not playing in the DDR-Oberliga at the time of its founding. As a dedicated football club, it was elevated into the upper tier of privileged elite clubs. The official sponsor of 1. FC Union Berlin was the state-owned combine VVB Hochspannungsgeräte und Kabel, which implemented its support through VEB Kabelwerk Oberspree, VEB Transformatorenwerk Oberschöneweide and other local state-owned enterprises. The first club president was the general director of VVB Hochspannungsgeräte und Kabel, Werner Otto, and his deputy was the SED Second Secretary in East Berlin, Hans Wagner. Even as a "civilian club", 1. FC Union Berlin was part of the state sports political system. (Note: Being a "civilian club" did not mean that the club was independent from the state sports political system. A "civilian club" was simply a club that was not affiliated to the sports associations (SV) of the armed organs: SV Dynamo or ASV Vorwärts. The civilian clubs were instead clubs of the DTSB. All clubs in the 1966-67 DDR-Oberliga, except FC Vorwärts Berlin, BFC Dynamo and SG Dynamo Dresden, were civilian clubs.) The most important positions on the board of 1. FC Union Berlin would exclusively be held by directors of state-owned factories or SED representatives. 1. FC Union Berlin was state-funded and all club decisions had to be reported to the all-powerful central sports agency DTSB. In turn, the DTSB stood under direct control of the SED Central Committee.

The support from the FDGB ended when Herbert Warnke was replaced by Harry Tisch as the chairman of the FDGB in 1975. Tisch had begun his political career in Rostock and instead gave his support to FC Hansa Rostock. This event was remarkable, as it revealed the large influence that high-ranking politicians exerted on football in East Germany. 1. FC Union Berlin would then have to rely on support from the regional district management (German: Bezirksleitung) of the ruling SED party in East Berlin and local state-owned enterprises. The main sponsors would be VEB Kabelwerk Oberspree (KWO), VEB Transformatorenwerk Oberschöneweide (TRO) and VEB Werk für Fernsehelektronik (WF). 1. FC Union Berlin developed a bitter rivalry with BFC Dynamo, which was supported by the Stasi. While their arch rivals won 10 titles in a row, Union yo-yoed between the DDR-Oberliga and the DDR-Liga with very little success. Union managed to win the East German Cup in 1968 when they defeated FC Carl Zeiss Jena 2–1 although they lost in their second cup appearance in 1986 to 1. FC Lokomotive Leipzig by a score of 1–5.

The East German state-owned film studio DEFA produced a documentary about the supporters of 1. FC Union Berlin in 1989. The documentary is called And Fridays at the Green Hell and follows a group of supporters of 1. FC Union Berlin to both home and away matches during the 1987–88 season.

=== 2. Bundesliga era (1990–2019) ===
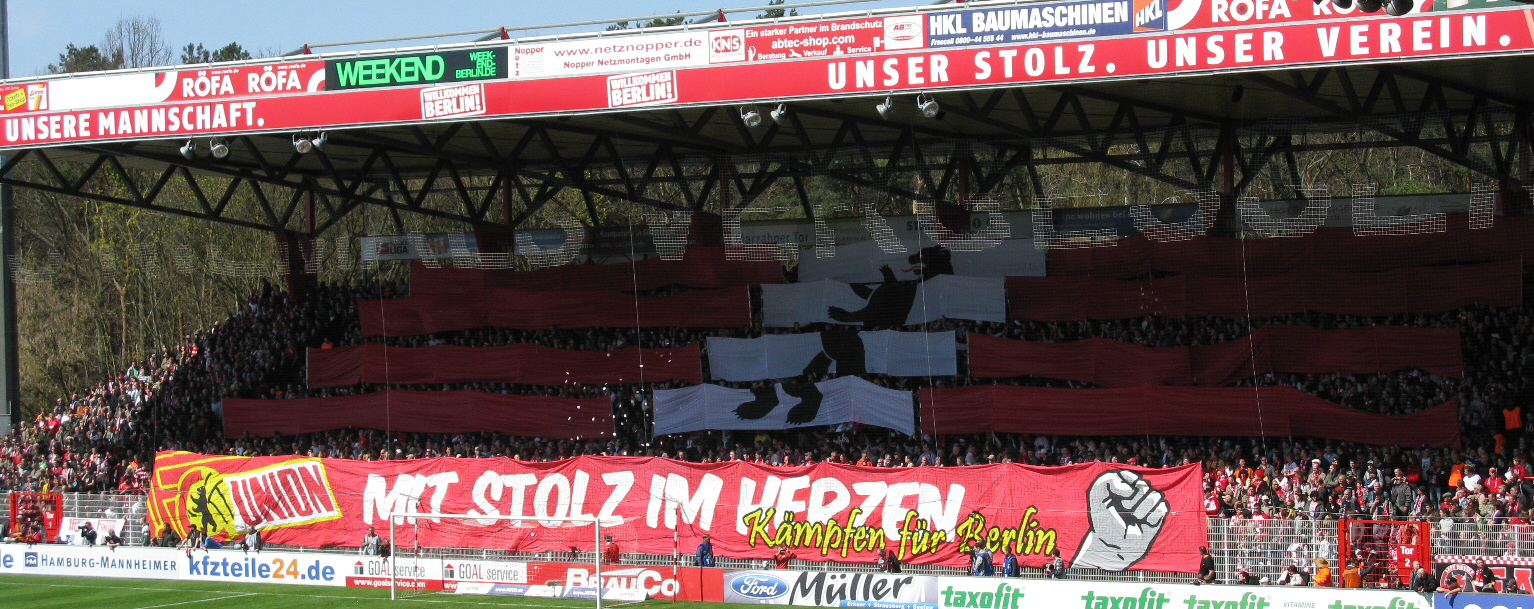
Supporters choreography in 2010

After German reunification in 1990, the team continued to perform well on the field, but almost collapsed financially. They managed to hang on and find sponsorship, but only after winning their division in both 1993 and 1994 and each time being denied a license to play in the 2. Bundesliga due to their financial problems. The club had another close brush with financial failure in 1997.

Union again came close to advancing to the 2. Bundesliga in 1998–99 and 1999–2000, but were disappointed. They were finally successful in 2000–01, under Bulgarian manager Georgi Vasilev, easily winning the Regionalliga Nord (III) and moving up a division to become the city's second most popular side. That same year they appeared in the final of the German Cup where they lost 0–2 to FC Schalke 04, and advanced as far as the second round in UEFA Cup before being put out by Bulgarian side PFC Litex Lovech. The club slipped to the Regionalliga Nord (III) in 2004–05 and then to the NOFV-Oberliga Nord (IV) in 2005–06, but returned to third division play after capturing the Oberliga title. In 2008–09, Union became one of the founding clubs of the new 3. Liga, and its inaugural champion, securing first place and promotion to the 2. Bundesliga on 10 May.

A controversy occurred in 2011 when it became publicly known that club president Dirk Zingler had been a member of the Felix Dzerzhinsky Guards Regiment for three years during his military service. Only two years before, Zingler had cancelled a sponsorship deal with the company International Sport Promotion (ISP) because the head of the board at the company had been a Stasi officer. The Felix Dzerzhinsky Guards Regiment was the paramilitary wing of the Stasi. Zingler explained that he had sought to spend his military service in Berlin and that he was unaware beforehand that the regiment belonged to the Stasi. However, the Felix Dzerzhinsky Guards Regiment was an elite formation; it was not possible to simply apply for the regiment. The Stasi selected who it thought were best fit to serve with the regiment, only accepting recruits who were "loyal to the line". Zingler had also been a member of the Socialist Unity Party (SED) and leader in the Free German Youth (FDJ) at the time. Speaking about the reports on Zingler in 2011, Union Press spokesman Christian Arbeit said: "We do have a very unique history, compared to other clubs. But it wasn't us that always claimed we were this big anti-Stasi club. These are stories that get simplified in the media."

On 1 June 2018, Swiss coach Urs Fischer was announced as new head coach of the club. The team remained in the second tier until the 2018–19 season, when they secured a first promotion to the Bundesliga after defeating VfB Stuttgart in the relegation play-offs. The club's supporters invaded the pitch after the victory, but no one was harmed.

=== Bundesliga era and European football (2019–present) ===
Union Berlin became the first Bundesliga club from the former East Berlin and the sixth from the former East Germany, after Dynamo Dresden, Hansa Rostock, VfB Leipzig, Energie Cottbus, and RB Leipzig. The team is the sixth to win promotion from the 2. Bundesliga by beating the 16th-placed Bundesliga team in the playoff – since it began in the 1981–82 season, the others being Bayer Uerdingen, 1. FC Saarbrücken, Stuttgarter Kickers, 1. FC Nürnberg and Fortuna Düsseldorf. Ahead of Union Berlin's debut season in the Bundesliga, the club signed Neven Subotić, Anthony Ujah and Christian Gentner, as well as re-signing Marvin Friedrich, who had scored a decisive goal against Stuttgart in the play-offs in the previous season to secure promotion for the club. Their first ever Bundesliga goal was scored by Sebastian Andersson in a 1–1 draw against Augsburg. On 31 August 2019, the club beat Borussia Dortmund 3–1 in a home game, a result that secured its first win in a Bundesliga game. The team finished the season in 11th place, with Sebastian Andersson scoring 12 goals.

On 22 May 2021, in Union Berlin's second Bundesliga season, the club qualified for the inaugural UEFA Europa Conference League after finishing seventh, following a 2–1 home win against RB Leipzig, with Max Kruse confirming Union Berlin's first European campaign in twenty years, with a 92nd-minute winner. In the following season, the club finished fifth in the league to qualify to the Europa League, where they reached the round of 16. In the 2022–23 season, Union Berlin qualified for the Champions League group stage for the first time in its history, after a 1–0 home win against Werder Bremen on the final matchday.

In the 2023–24 season, the club experienced a bad start including 14 winless competitive matches in a row, hence they decided to separate with coach Urs Fischer by "mutual agreement". Following two consecutive defeats against relegation rivals Bochum and 1. FC Köln in the late stages of the season, Union dropped to the 16th place. On the final matchday, they clinched a 2–1 win over Freiburg in the stoppage-time, securing their continued presence in the Bundesliga.

== Stadium ==
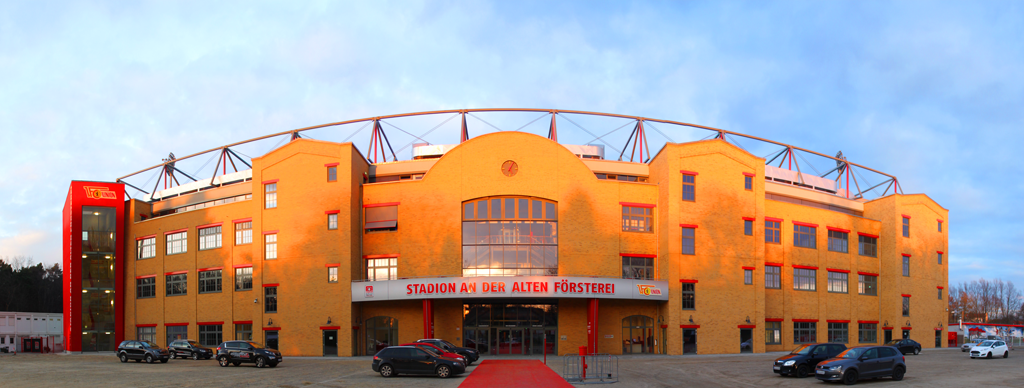
The main building of the stadium was inaugurated in late 2013.

In 1920, SC Union Oberschöneweide (forerunner of today's 1. FC Union Berlin) had to find a new home ground as its former pitch had been built over by developers with residential buildings. The club moved a little further away from the city to the north-western part of the borough of Köpenick. The new stadium was officially opened in August 1920 with a match between Oberschöneweide and the then German champions 1. FC Nürnberg (1–2). The inaugural match in at the Alte Försterei had already been played on 17 March, when Union challenged Viktoria 89 Berlin.

When Union won promotion to the DDR-Oberliga (the top flight in East Germany) in 1966, the stadium soon needed to be expanded. The ground was first expanded in 1970 when the Gegengerade terrace was raised, whilst further extensions to the terracing at both ends in the late 1970s and early 1980s increased the capacity furthermore to 22,500. However, the somewhat spartan facilities at Alte Försterei had quickly begun to show their age and went into a serious decline.

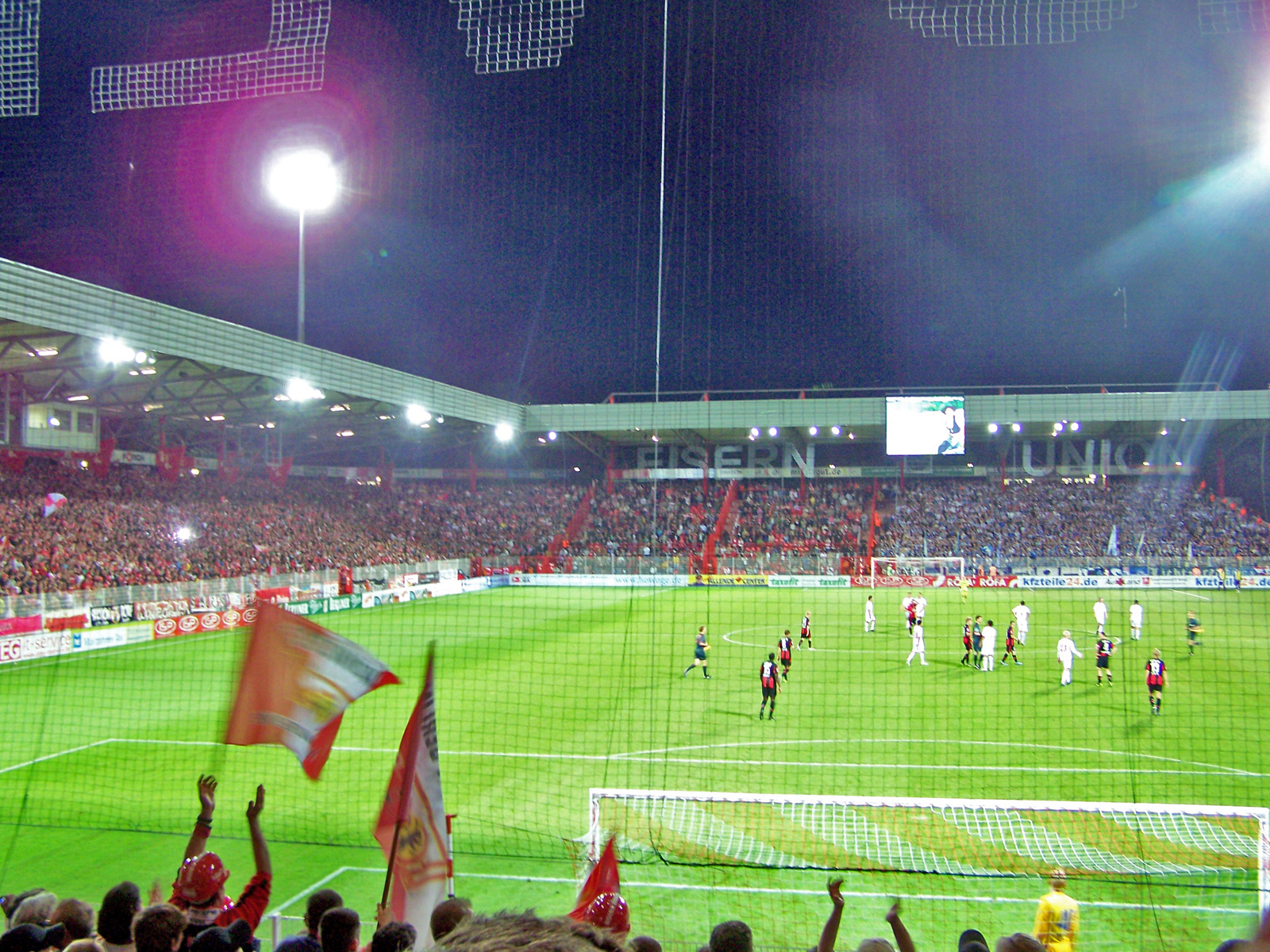
The Stadion An der Alten Försterei is the largest single-purpose football stadium in Berlin.

After German reunification, when Union were assigned by the German Football Association to play in the third league, the outdated stadium proved only one of a number of factors that hampered the club's push for promotion to higher leagues.

In the middle of 2008, the club decided to finally modernise the stadium, the Stadion An der Alten Försterei (Old Forester's House). Money was still tight, and so the fans simply built the ground themselves. More than 2,000 Union supporters invested 140,000 working hours to create what is now regarded as the largest football-specific stadium in Berlin. During the redevelopment, Union played at the Friedrich-Ludwig-Jahn-Sportpark. Inside the stadium an array of outside beer kiosks and open air grills serving bratwurst and pork steaks at the back of the stand provide the culinary staples. The official opening on 12 July 2013, was celebrated with a friendly against Scottish Champions Celtic. It holds 22,012 people with 3,617 seats. The rest is terracing.

=== World Cup living room ===
In 2014, the club came up with the idea of inviting their fans to take their own sofas to the ground for the whole of the World Cup, to enjoy the televised matches in the company of fellow supporters. More than 800 sofas were placed on the pitch in rows in front of a big screen. The event was later recognized with the Fan Experience Award at The Stadium Business Summit 2015 in Barcelona.

=== Redevelopments of the Försterei and European Games ===
In 2017, the club announced plans to expand the Försterei from 22,012 to 37,000 with the installation of a new tier across the 3 stands that oppose the main stand. It was announced that the plans should start at the end of the 2023/24 season. However, capacity concerns with local transport infrastructure caused delays to the project, and in November 2025, the club announced that plans would proceed with a revised capacity of 32,500 places, with the Waldseite end and the entire lower bowl remaining standing room only, while more sections would be built initially with seats. At the same time the club announced that the 2026-27 Bundesliga season would be the final one at the current stadium, with the club playing one season at the Olympiastadion before returning to the expanded Alten Försterei in 2028, the same year when an expanded Köpenick station with additional platforms for regional trains is expected to be completed.

In 2021/22, Union Berlin played their UEFA Europa Conference League Games at the Olympiastadion due to UEFA's ban of Terracing, which was lifted in the 2022/23 season in favour of Safe Standing. Union was able to play at the Försterei for the 2022/23 UEFA Europa League campaign. Then, in the Wake of their Qualification to the 2023/24 UEFA Champions League, Dirk Zingler confirmed that Union will be again playing at the Olympiastadion, as well as confirming that the Försterei will be used in the UEFA Youth League. This was not done under UEFA's guidance but rather voluntarily. This is because the demand for tickets exceeded the Försterei's capacity, as demonstrated during the UEFA Champions League season ticket sales: all 120,000 tickets for the 3 home games (40,000 per match) sold out in a single day.

== Organization ==
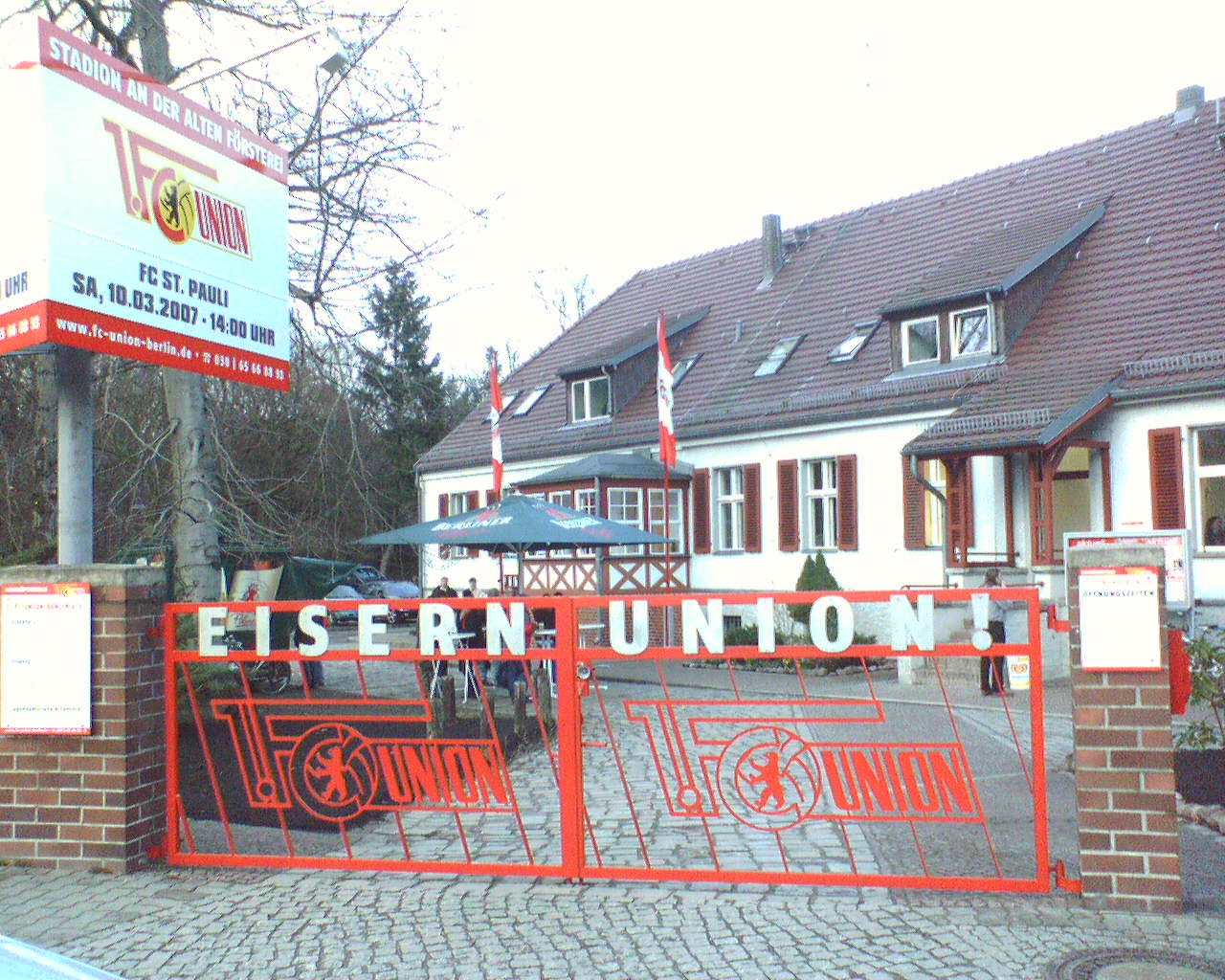
The Alte Försterei (Old foresters house) is the main office of the club.

1. FC Union Berlin is led mostly by fans. Dirk Zingler has served as the club's president since 2004. The club had 41,088 registered members in 2022.

President	From	To
Werner Otto	20 June 1966	31 July 1967
Heinz Müller	1 August 1967	31 July 1970
Paul Fettback	1 August 1970	31 October 1973
Heinz Hiillert	1 November 1973	25 November 1975
Günter Mielis	26 November 1975	1 March 1982
Dr. Norbert Woick	2 March 1982	31 October 1983
Klaus Brumm	1 November 1983	20 December 1984
Uwe Piontek	21 December 1984	3 November 1987
Hans-Günther Hansel	4 November 1987	5 June 1990
Gerhard Kalweit	6 June 1990	31 July 1993
Detlef Bracht	17 August 1993	31 July 1994
Horst Kahstein	14 November 1994	September 1997
Heiner Bertram	7 October 1997	12 October 2003
Jürgen Schlebrowski	13 October 2003	30 June 2004
Dirk Zingler	1 July 2004

=== Sport Management ===
- Oliver Ruhnert, since 5 May 2018

=== Sponsorships ===
1. FC Union Berlin is sponsored by around 300 private and corporate partners.

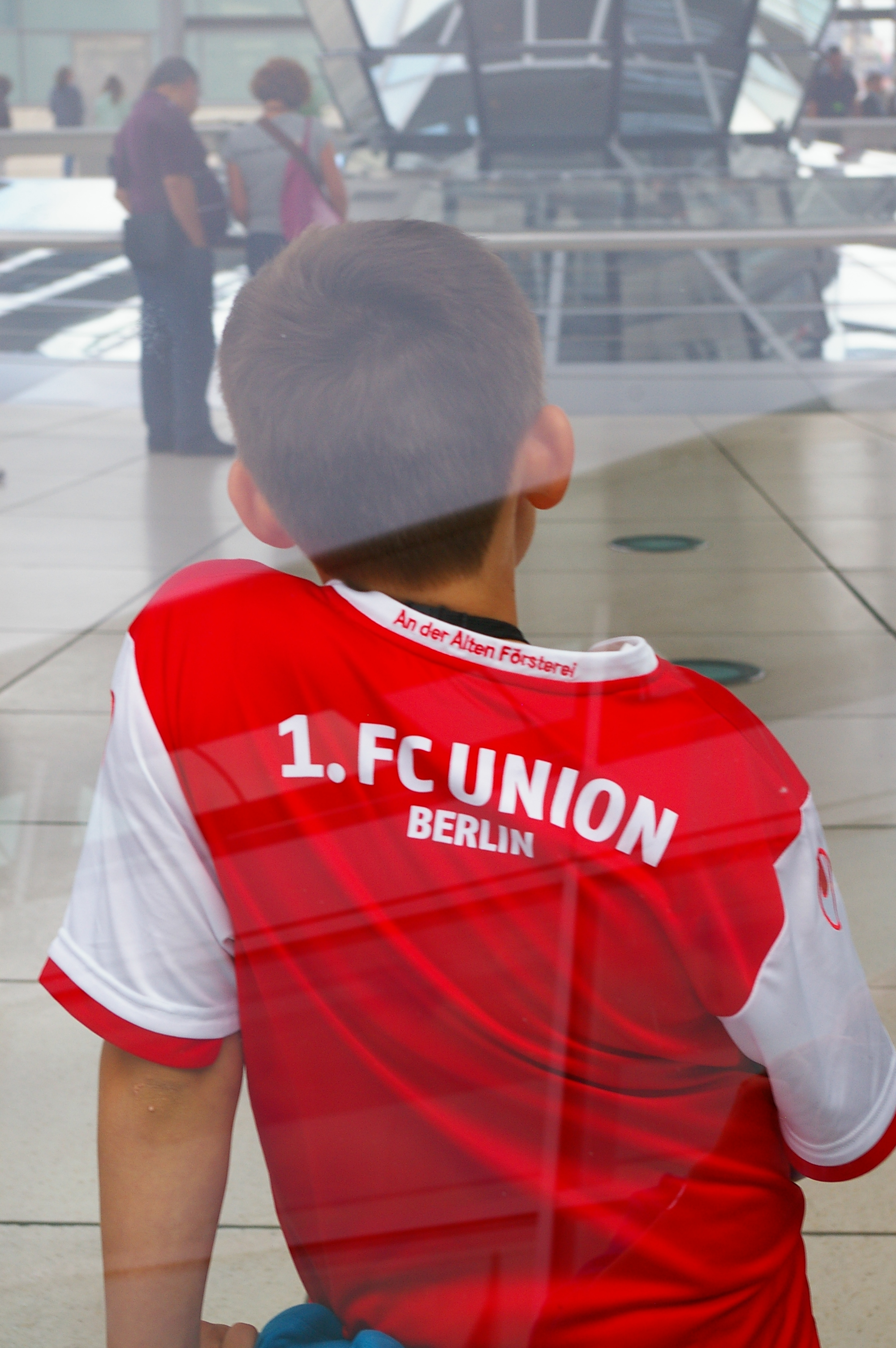
Young Union Berlin supporter

Period	Kit manufacturer	Shirt sponsor
1998/99	Nike	Skandia
1999/2000	Nike	BSR Gruppe
2000/01	Nike	BSR Gruppe
2001/02	Nike	BSR Gruppe
2002/03	Saller	BSR Gruppe
2003/04	Saller	BSR Gruppe
2004/05	Saller	BSR Gruppe
2005/06	Nike	EastWest
2006/07	Nike	EastWest
2007/08	Nike	Silicon Sensor
2008/09	do you football	Silicon Sensor
2009/10	do you football	kfzteile24
2010/11	do you football	kfzteile24
2011/12	Uhlsport	kfzteile24
2012/13	Uhlsport	f.becker
2013/14	Uhlsport	f.becker
2014/15	Uhlsport	kfzteile24
2015/16	Macron	kfzteile24
2016/17	Macron	Layenberger
2017/18	Macron	Layenberger
2018/19	Macron	Layenberger
2019/20	Macron	Aroundtown
2020/21	Adidas	Aroundtown
2021/22	Adidas	Aroundtown
2022/23	Adidas	Wefox

=== Organizational history ===
The organizational history of 1. FC Union Berlin includes several different clubs and names.

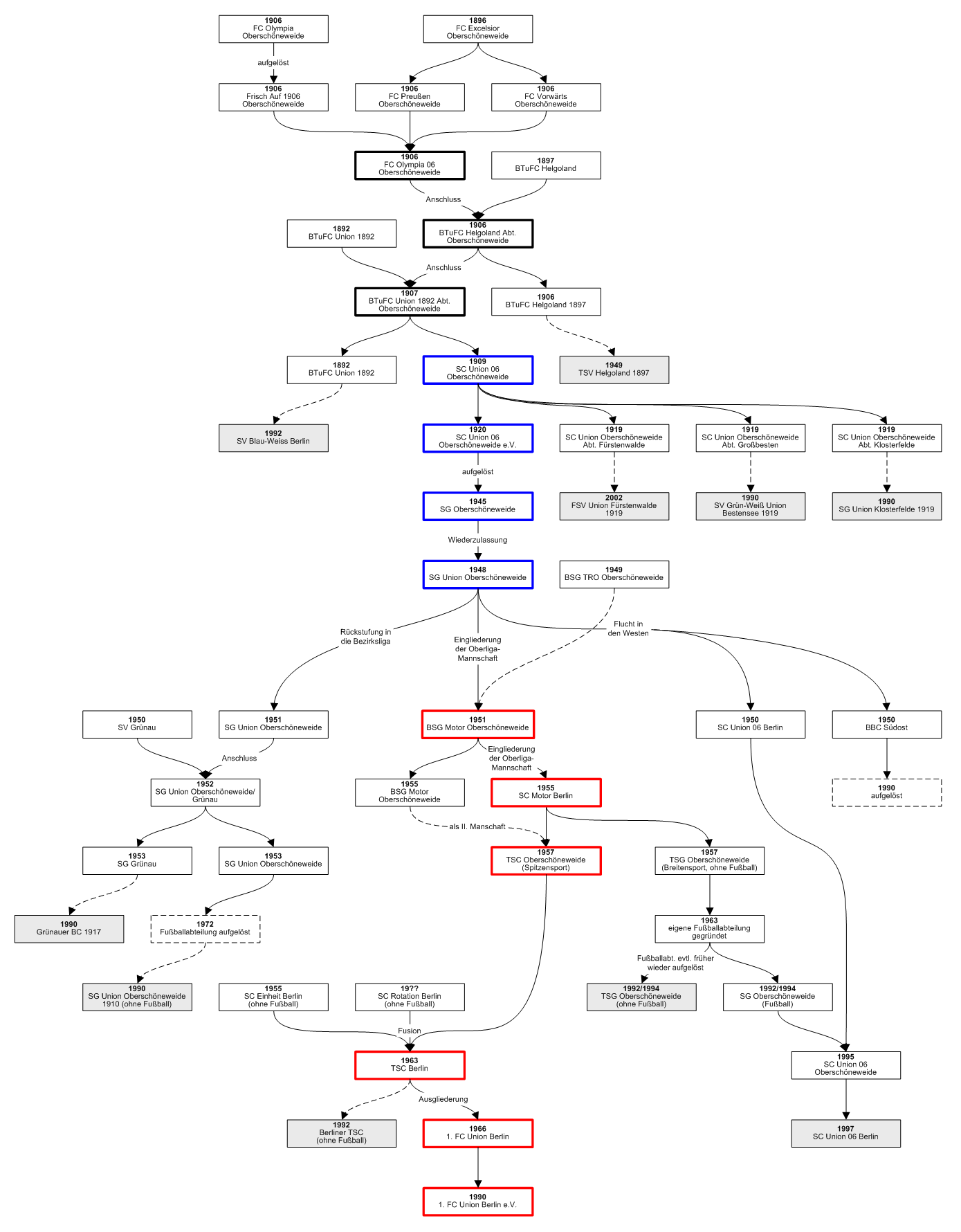
The organizational history 1. FC Union Berlin (in German).

Date	Name	Note
17 June 1906	FC Olympia Oberschöneweide	Founding of FC Olympia Oberschöneweide.
22 July 1906	BTuFC Helgoland, department Oberschöneweide	Joined club BTuFC Helgoland as a third team and department in Oberschöneweide.
10 February 1907	BTuFC Union 1892, department Oberschöneweide	Joined club BTuFC Union 1892 as a fourth team and department in Oberschöneweide.
20 February 1909	Union Oberschöneweide	Joined the football association Verband Berliner Ballspielvereine (VBB) as Union Oberschöneweide, or more precisely SC Union Oberschöneweide.
1945	SG Oberschöneweide	SC Union Oberschöneweide was dissolved by the Allied occupation authorities and the club was refounded as SG Oberschöneweide.
December 1948	SG Union Oberschöneweide	The club was re-admitted under its old club name.
1951	BSG Motor Oberschöneweide	Joined with enterprise sports community BSG Motor Oberschöneweide. The team colours are changed from the traditional blue and white to today's characteristic red and white.
1 February 1955	SC Motor Berlin	The first team was joined with the new sports club SC Motor Berlin as a football department.
6 June 1957	TSC Oberschöneweide	SC Motor Berlin was merged with several enterprise sports communities (BSG) to form sports club TSC Oberschöneweide.
18 February 1963	TSC Berlin	Merged with other sports clubs to form TSC Berlin.
20 January 1966	1. FC Union Berlin	The football department of TSC Berlin was separated from the sports club and reorganized into a football club. Founding of 1. FC Union Berlin.

== Players ==
=== Current squad ===
As of 1 September 2026

Note: Flags indicate national team as defined under FIFA eligibility rules; some limited exceptions apply. Players may hold more than one non-FIFA nationality.

No.	Pos.	Nation	Player
1	GK	DEN	Frederik Rønnow
2	DF	GER	Felix Uduokhai
3	DF	GER	Andrik Markgraf
4	DF	BEL	Zeno Van Den Bosch
5	DF	GER	Marvin Friedrich
6	MF	GER	Aljoscha Kemlein
7	FW	SCO	Oliver Burke
8	MF	TUN	Rani Khedira (vice-captain)
9	FW	TUR	Livan Burcu
11	MF	KOR	Jeong Woo-yeong
13	MF	HUN	András Schäfer
14	DF	AUT	Leopold Querfeld
15	DF	GER	Tom Rothe
17	DF	GHA	Derrick Köhn
18	DF	CRO	Josip Juranović

No.	Pos.	Nation	Player
19	MF	GER	Janik Haberer
20	MF	SUI	Michel Aebischer
21	MF	GER	Tim Skarke
23	FW	SRB	Andrej Ilić
24	MF	DEN	Robert Skov
25	GK	GER	Carl Klaus
27	FW	CRO	Marin Ljubičić
28	DF	AUT	Christopher Trimmel (captain)
29	FW	CIV	Emmanuel Latte Lath (on loan from Atlanta United)
30	MF	SUI	Kastriot Imeri
31	GK	GER	Matheo Raab
32	FW	JAM	Mekhi Gray
34	DF	FRA	Stanley Nsoki
38	FW	GER	Julien Friedrich
49	MF	GER	Linus Güther

=== Out on loan ===
Note: Flags indicate national team as defined under FIFA eligibility rules; some limited exceptions apply. Players may hold more than one non-FIFA nationality.

No.	Pos.	Nation	Player
—	DF	GER	Oluwaseun Ogbemudia (at Waldhof Mannheim until 30 June 2027)
—	DF	GER	Leon Prosche (at Erzgebirge Aue until 30 June 2027)

No.	Pos.	Nation	Player
—	MF	GER	Tim Blaszczak (at FSV 63 Luckenwalde until 30 June 2027)
—	FW	UKR	Dmytro Bohdanov (at Energie Cottbus until 30 June 2027)

=== Notable former players ===
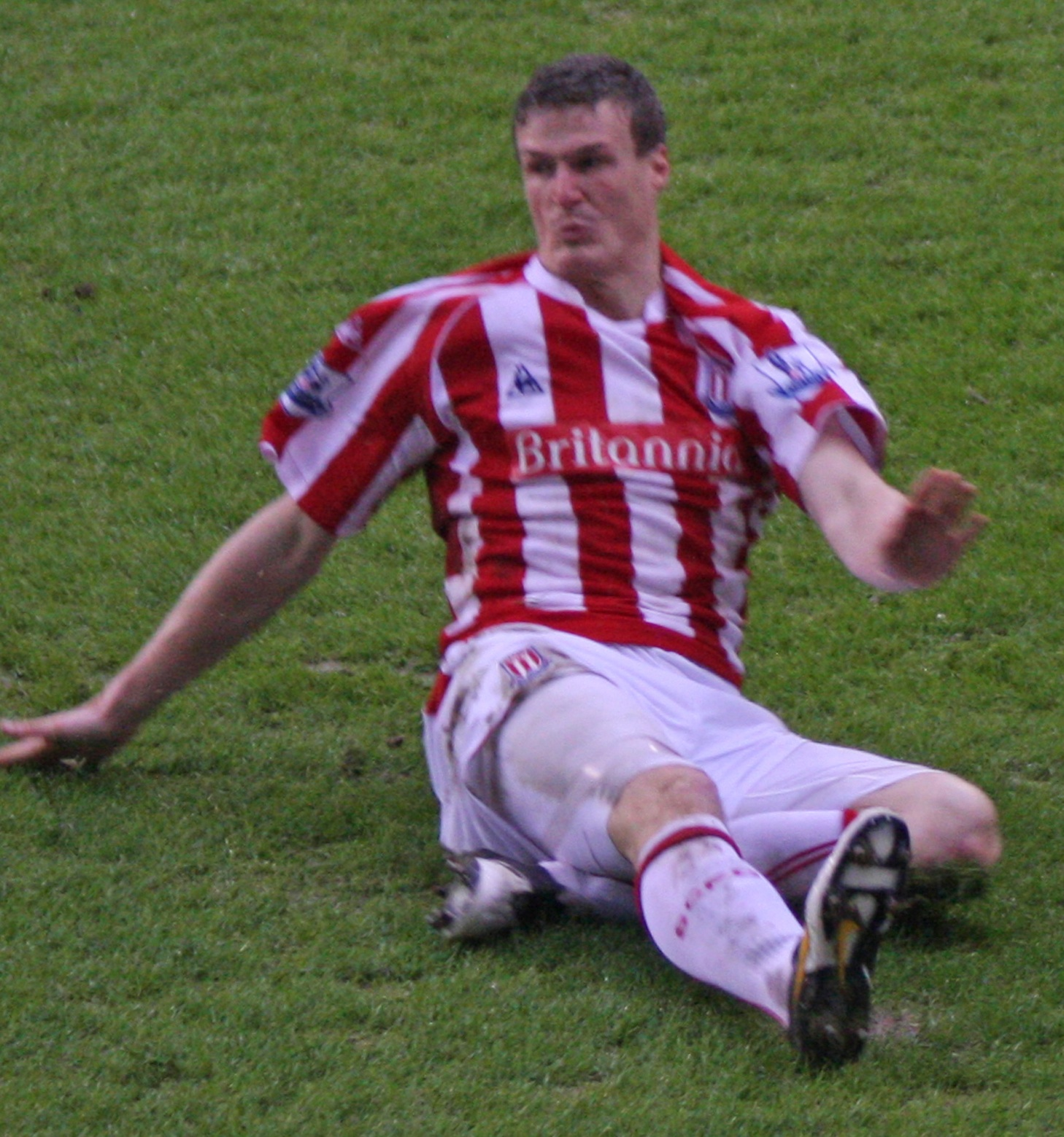
Robert Huth left the club's youth system in 2001, joining Chelsea.

- (Algeria) Karim Benyamina
- (Bosnia and Herzegovina) Sergej Barbarez
- (Brazil) Daniel Teixeira
- (Czech Republic) Alex Král
- (Germany) Kevin Behrens
- (Germany) Christian Gentner
- (Germany) Robin Gosens
- (Germany) Jörg Heinrich
- (Germany) Robert Huth
- (Germany) Max Kruse
- (Germany) Torsten Mattuschka
- (Germany) Sebastian Polter
- (Germany) Marko Rehmer
- (Norway) Julian Ryerson
- (Nigeria) Taiwo Awoniyi
- (Suriname) Sheraldo Becker
- (Sweden) Sebastian Andersson
- (United States) Bobby Wood

=== All-time top scorer ===
(Algeria) Karim Benyamina (87)

The number 22 will not be worn on the back of a Union shirt until someone breaks the all-time Union scoring record of Karim Benyamina, who scored 87 goals in 213 appearances for the club. "This is a great gesture by president Dirk Zingler. That is the reward for six successful years," he said in 2016. Over 14,000 fans turned out to give Benyamina his career send-off alongside another legend, Torsten Mattuschka, who is often seen as the face of that particular era for Union.

=== Reserve team ===
The club's reserve team, 1. FC Union Berlin II, most recently played in the tier four Regionalliga Nordost, having won promotion to the league in 2012. Previous to this, it spent two seasons in the NOFV-Oberliga Nord. At the end of the 2014–15 season, the club withdrew the team from competition.

=== Women ===
Union Berlin's women's team was formed in September 1969, becoming the first women's team in Berlin and one of the first in East Germany. The women's team initially competed against Union Berlin's youth teams due to a lack of opponents, playing their first game on 17 January 1970, losing 7–1. In 1971, the team were amalgamated into KWO Berlin's women's team, before KWO merged with Union Berlin in June 1990 following German reunification.

== Coaching staff ==
As of 9 July 2026

Role	Name
Head coach	(Switzerland) Mauro Lustrinelli
Assistant coach	(Switzerland) Enrico Schirinzi (Switzerland) Michel Renggli (Germany) Sascha Stauch (Germany) Sebastian Bönig
Goalkeeping coach	(Germany) Marcel Höttecke
Athletic trainer	(Germany) Martin Krüger
Rehab trainer	(Germany) Johannes Thienel
Assistant coach/Match analyst	(Germany) Adrian Wittmann
Team doctor	(Germany) Dr. Clemens Gwinner (Austria) Dr. Martin Resl (Germany) Dr. Marvin Minkus
Senior physiotherapist	(Germany) Maximilian Perschk (Germany) Sven Kuhlbrodt
Physiotherapist	(Germany) Marcel Möller (Germany) Robert Kemna
Masseur	(Germany) Thomas Riedel
Team coordination	(Germany) Susanne Kopplin
Kit manager	(Germany) Dominik Westerfeld
Team supervisor/Bus Driver	(Germany) Michael Ruprecht

=== Managerial history ===
List of Union Berlin managers since 1965

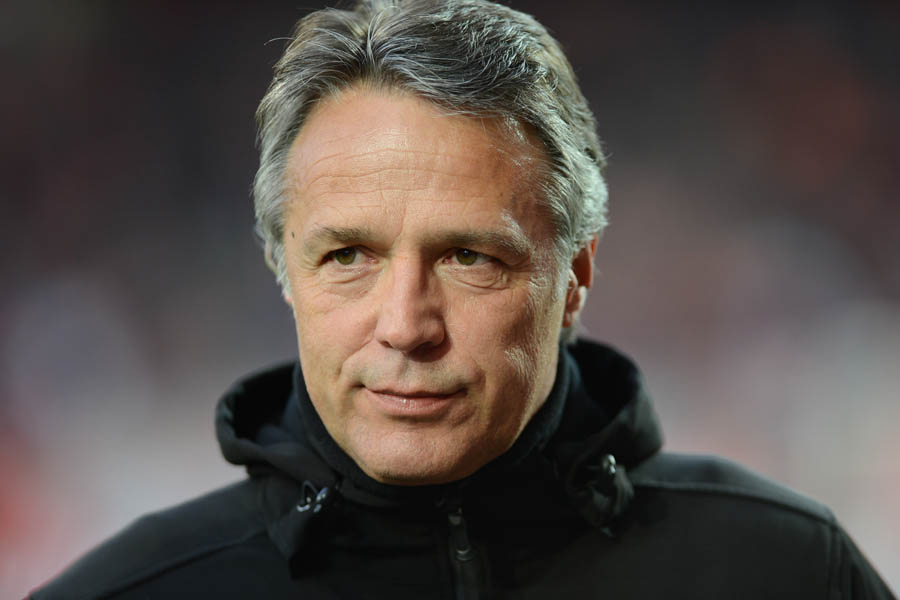
Uwe Neuhaus was the longest-serving manager of Union Berlin

(East Germany) Werner Schwenzfeier	20 January 1965	30 June 1969
(East Germany) Fritz Gödicke	1 Jul 1969	30 June 1970
(East Germany) Harald Seeger	1 Jul 1970	30 June 1972
(East Germany) Ulrich Prüfke	1 Jul 1972	30 June 1974
(East Germany) Dieter Fietz	1 Jul 1974	6 Dec 1975
(East Germany) Heini Brüll (caretaker)	7 Dec 1975	31 December 1975
(East Germany) Heinz Werner	1 Jan 1976	18 July 1982
(East Germany) Harry Nippert	19 July 1982	30 September 1983
(East Germany) Karl-Heinz Burwieck	1 Okt. 1983	30 June 1984
(East Germany) Karl Schäffner	1 Jul 1984	31 December 1987
(East Germany) Karsten Heine	1 Jan 1988	9 Apr 1990
(East Germany) Gerd Struppert (caretaker)	10 April 1990	30 June 1990
(East Germany) Werner Voigt	1 Jul 1990	3 Jun 1992
(Germany) Gerhard Körner (caretaker)	4 Jun 1992	30 June 1992
(Germany) Frank Pagelsdorf	1 Jul 1992	30 June 1994
(Germany) Frank Engel	1 Jul 1994	25 January 1995
(Germany) Hans Meyer	26 January 1995	2 Oct 1995
(Germany) Eckhard Krautzun	3 Oct 1995	24 March 1996
(Germany) Frank Vogel (caretaker)	25 March 1996	10 April 1996
(Germany) Karsten Heine	11 April 1996	25 September 1997
(Germany) Frank Vogel	26 September 1997	14 December 1997
(Germany) Ingo Weniger	2 Jan 1998	30 September 1998
(Germany) Fritz Fuchs	30 September 1998	1 Jun 1999
(Bulgaria) Georgi Vasilev	1 Jul 1999	12 October 2002
(Bulgaria) Ivan Tischanski (caretaker)	13 October 2002	5 Nov 2002
(Germany) Miroslav Votava	6 Nov 2002	24 March 2004
(Bosnia and Herzegovina) Aleksandar Ristić	25 March 2004	30 June 2004
(Germany) Frank Wormuth	1 Jul 2004	27 September 2004
(Germany) Werner Voigt	28 September 2004	9 Dec 2004
(Germany) Lothar Hamann/ (Germany) Holger Wortmann (caretakers)	10 December 2004	19 December 2004
(Germany) Frank Lieberam	20 December 2004	9 Dec 2005
(Bulgaria) Georgi Vasilev	13 December 2005	5 Apr 2006
(Germany) Christian Schreier	6 Apr 2006	19 June 2007
(Germany) Uwe Neuhaus	20 June 2007	12 May 2014
(Germany) Norbert Düwel	1 July 2014	31 August 2015
(Germany) Sascha Lewandowski	1 September 2015	4 March 2016
(Germany) André Hofschneider (caretaker)	5 March 2016	30 June 2016
(Germany) Jens Keller	1 July 2016	4 December 2017
(Germany) André Hofschneider	4 December 2017	20 May 2018
(Switzerland) Urs Fischer	1 June 2018	15 November 2023
(Germany) Marco Grote (caretaker)	15 November 2023	26 November 2023
(Croatia) Nenad Bjelica	26 November 2023	6 May 2024
(Germany) Marco Grote (caretaker)	6 May 2024	30 June 2024
(Denmark) Bo Svensson	1 July 2024	27 December 2024
(Germany) Steffen Baumgart	2 January 2025	11 April 2026
(Germany) Marie-Louise Eta (caretaker)	12 April 2026	20 May 2026
(Switzerland) Mauro Lustrinelli	21 May 2026	present

== European record ==
=== Overview ===
Competition	S	Pld	W	D	L	GF	GA	GD
UEFA Champions League	1	6	0	2	4	6	10	−4
UEFA Europa League/UEFA Cup	2	14	6	4	4	14	13	+1
UEFA Europa Conference League	1	8	3	2	3	12	9	+3
Intertoto Cup	2	12	5	2	5	15	12	+3
Total	6	40	14	10	16	47	44	+3

=== Matches ===
Union Berlin score listed first.

Season	Competition	Round	Opposition	Home	Away	Agg.
1967–68	Intertoto Cup	Group B7	(Denmark) KB	0–3	0–1	3rd place
1967–68	Intertoto Cup	Group B7	(Poland) Katowice	3–0	0–1	3rd place
1967–68	Intertoto Cup	Group B7	(Czechoslovakia) Union Teplice	0–1	1–1	3rd place
1986–87	Intertoto Cup	Group 2	(West Germany) Bayer Uerdingen	3–2	0–3	1st place
1986–87	Intertoto Cup	Group 2	(Switzerland) Lausanne-Sport	1–0	1–1	1st place
1986–87	Intertoto Cup	Group 2	(Belgium) Standard Liège	4–1	2–1	1st place
2001–02	UEFA Cup	1R	(Finland) Haka	3–0	1–1	4–1
2001–02	UEFA Cup	2R	(Bulgaria) Litex Lovech	0–2	0–0	0–2
2021–22	UEFA Europa Conference League	PO	(Finland) KuPS	0–0	4–0	4–0
2021–22	UEFA Europa Conference League	Group E	(Czech Republic) Slavia Prague	1–1	1–3	3rd place
2021–22	UEFA Europa Conference League	Group E	(Netherlands) Feyenoord	1–2	1–3	3rd place
2021–22	UEFA Europa Conference League	Group E	(Israel) Maccabi Haifa	3–0	1–0	3rd place
2022–23	UEFA Europa League	Group D	(Belgium) Union Saint-Gilloise	0–1	1–0	2nd place
2022–23	UEFA Europa League	Group D	(Portugal) Braga	1–0	0–1	2nd place
2022–23	UEFA Europa League	Group D	(Sweden) Malmö FF	1–0	1–0	2nd place
2022–23	UEFA Europa League	KRPO	(Netherlands) Ajax	3–1	0–0	3–1
2022–23	UEFA Europa League	R16	(Belgium) Union Saint-Gilloise	3–3	0–3	3–6
2023–24	UEFA Champions League	Group C	(Spain) Real Madrid	2–3	0–1	4th place
2023–24	UEFA Champions League	Group C	(Portugal) Braga	2–3	1–1	4th place
2023–24	UEFA Champions League	Group C	(Italy) Napoli	0–1	1–1	4th place

=== UEFA club coefficient ranking ===
As of 2 May 2026

Rank	Team	Points
88	(England) Leicester City	23.952
89	(Slovenia) NK Celje	23.000
90	(Germany) Union Berlin	23.000
91	(Poland) Raków	22.250
92	(Poland) Jagiellonia	22.000

== Player records ==
=== Most appearances ===
Competitive, professional matches only. Up to date as of 24 September 2024

Rank	Player	Years	League	Cup	Europe	Other	Total
1	(Austria) Christopher Trimmel	2014–present	293	23	19	1	336
2	(East Germany) Lutz Hendel	1968–1984	297	4	6	0	307
3	(Germany) Tom Persich	1994–2006	285	14	4	0	303
4	(Germany) Torsten Mattuschka	2005–2014	272	9	0	0	281
5	(Germany) Michael Parensen	2009–2020	234	13	0	2	249
6	(Germany) Jan Glinker	2002–2014	232	4	0	0	236
7	(Germany) Christian Stuff	2006–2014	214	5	0	0	219
8	(Germany) Ronny Nikol	1997–2003	200	11	4	1	216
9	(East Germany) (Germany) Frank Placzek	1987–1997	192	3	0	1	196
10	(Algeria) Karim Benyamina	2005–2011	189	3	0	0	192

=== Top goalscorers ===
Competitive, professional matches only. Up to date as of 24 September 2024

Rank	Player	Years	League	Cup	Europe	Total (Apps)	Ratio
1	(Poland) Jacek Mencel	1990–1994	66	0	0	66 (118)	0.56
2	(Algeria) Karim Benyamina	2005–2011	62	0	0	62 (192)	0.45
3	(Germany) Torsten Mattuschka	2005–2014	60	1	0	61 (281)	0.22
4	(Bosnia and Herzegovina) Sergej Barbarez	1993–1996	48	0	0	48 (92)	0.52
5	(Brazil) Daniel Teixeira	2001, 2005–2007	47	0	0	47 (68)	0.69
6	(Germany) Sebastian Polter	2014–2015, 2017–2020	44	2	0	46 (104)	0.44
7	(North Macedonia) Goran Markov	1993–1995	43	1	0	44 (83)	0.53
7	(Germany) Nico Patschinski	1994–1998, 2006–2009	43	1	0	44 (140)	0.31
9	(Germany) Steffen Menze	1998–2003	38	2	0	40 (164)	0.24
10	(Germany) Matthias Zimmerling	1991–1994, 1997–1998	37	0	0	37 (92)	0.40

== Club culture ==
1. FC Union Berlin has gained a reputation as a "cult" club in European football due to many unique fan and club initiatives over the past two decades.

The nicknames of the club are Eiserne (the Iron Ones) or Eisern Union (Iron Union). These nicknames evolved from the earlier sobriquet Schlosserjungs (metalworker boys), a reference to the blue kit the Union played in, as it was reminiscent of the overalls worn by local workers.

In May 2004, the supporters raised enough money to secure the club's license for fourth-division football through a campaign called 'Bleed for Union'. This catchphrase was not meant metaphorically. One element of the campaign was that fans donated blood to Berlin hospitals and then gave the money they received from the blood bank to their club.

After 2010, Union Berlin became increasingly attractive for new Berliners, even internationals, who were drawn to the atmosphere at the club.

In 2023, Rootz Ltd entertainment brand Wildz became a premier sponsor of the club. Wildz is the sister brand to Wheelz, a platform that features The Hoff, an entertainment figure who also enjoys cult status in Germany.

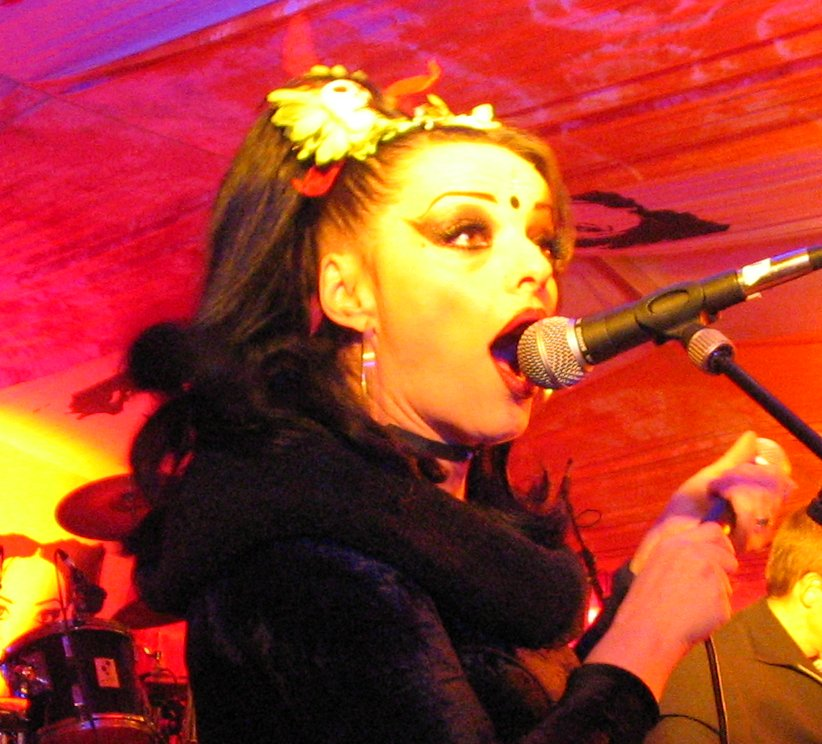
Punk musician Nina Hagen

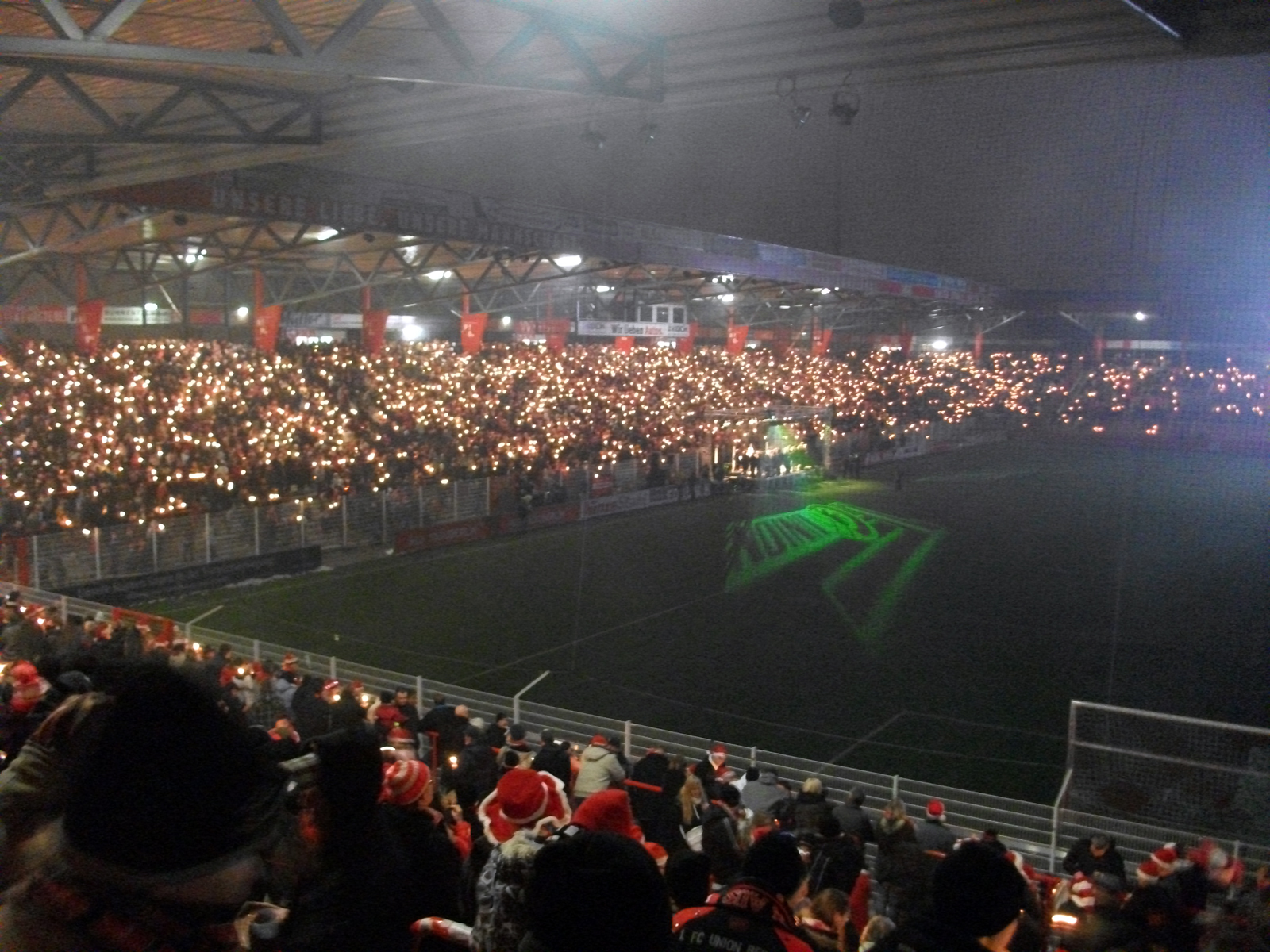
Weihnachtssingen (Christmas carols singing) in 2010

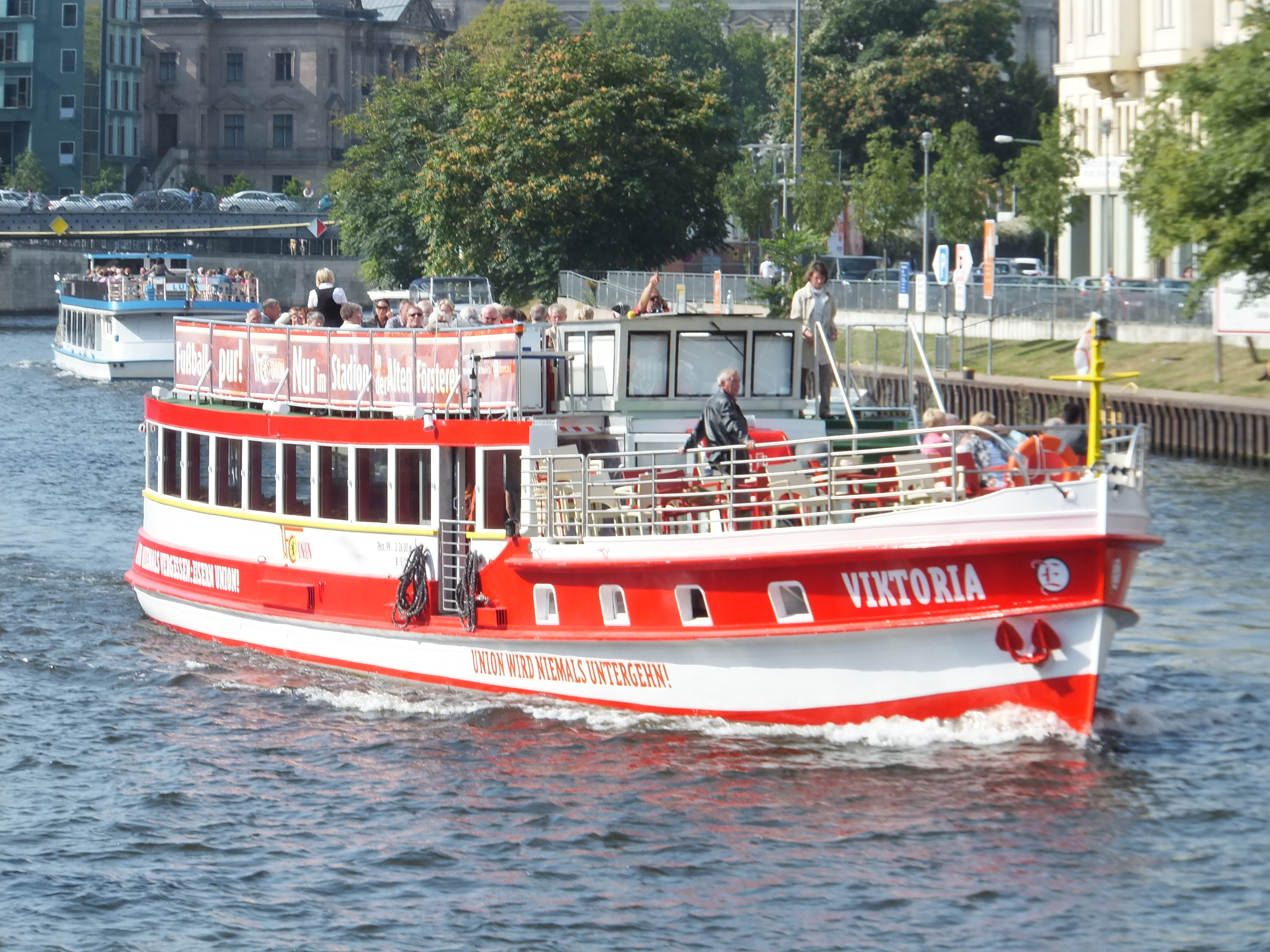
Union Berlin boat on the river Spree

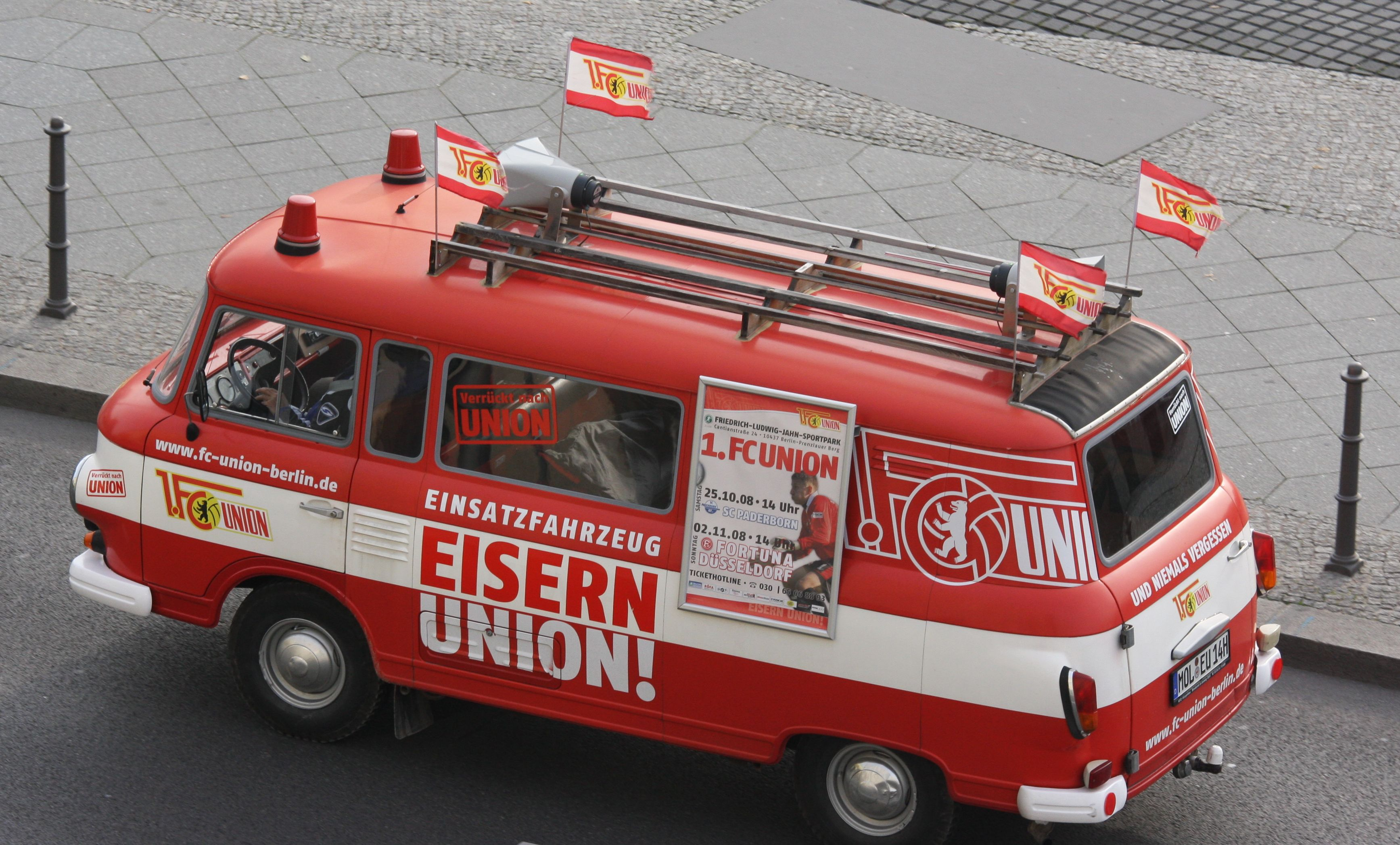
Union Berlin Bus

=== Rivalries ===
During the East German era, 1. FC Union Berlin was known for a rivalry with BFC Dynamo, which was reputedly affiliated with the powerful state security service of East Germany (Stasi). Union, on the other hand, was supported by the regional district management of the ruling SED party and sponsored by local state-owned enterprises. The club played some identificatory role in the unofficial opposition against the authorities of the communist system. Between 1979 and 1988, BFC Dynamo won ten consecutive East German league titles, with popular allegations of sporting misconduct helping to fuel the rivalry, and clashes between both sets of fans occurred. BFC Dynamo was seen as the supreme representative of the security agencies, with advantages in the recruitment of players and financial support, as well as the political clout of Erich Mielke. An expression among the supporters of Union Berlin was: "Better to be a loser than a stupid Stasi pig". Supporters of Union cultivated the image of their club as the eternal underdog that was firmly rooted in the working class. Union became the most popular club in East Berlin.

It is said that fans of 1. FC Union Berlin often chanted "The wall must go!", with a reference to the Berlin Wall, when the opponents formed a wall during free kicks in the 1980s. However, some sources suggest that this is partly a myth and exaggerated. (Note: A former Stasi employee, who was one of two employees responsible for monitoring the supporter scene of Union Berlin, claims that he never heard such chants himself, and that they would not have intervened with such chants anyway. Chants were only noted in their reports and classified among themselves: if they came from someone they had to worry about or if it was just someone venting their frustration. The Stasi also had two employees responsible for monitoring the supporter scene of BFC Dynamo in the same way.) Supporters of Union saw themselves as stubborn and non-conformist. But this image should not be confused with actual resistance. For some supporters of Union, the dissident reputation is a legend that was created after Die Wende. Honorary president of Union Günter Mielis has said: "Union was not a club of resistance fighters, but we had to fight against a lot of political and economic resistance over and over again. We got strength from our fans". Politics was not in the foreground. Most supporters of Union were just normal football supporters. There were no political groups at Union. A supporter of Union from the East German era has said: "With the best of intentions, Union fans did not contribute to the overthrow of the GDR. No way, we were interested in football. There is the cliché about the club for the enemies of the state, but that wasn't us". Another supporter said: "I think it's a myth that all Unioners were in the opposition. I think it was a basic attitude of the East German football youth in the 1970s and 1980s, that they were critical of the system." Supporters of Union from the East German era have testified that the club was the most important thing, and the identification with Union had primarily to do with Köpenick.

Despite 1. FC Union Berlin and Hertha BSC making up the two biggest clubs in Berlin, a rivalry between the two has been much less pronounced. Sympathies between supporters of the two clubs developed in divided Berlin. The first personal contacts between supporters of the two clubs occurred in the 1970s. Supporters of Hertha visited the Stadion An der Alten Försterei and supporters of Union accompanied the supporters of Hertha when Hertha played in the Eastern Bloc countries, such as the quarter finals in the 1978–79 UEFA Cup against Dukla Prague. Chants and slogans such as "Ha-Ho-He, there are only two teams on the Spree – Union and Hertha BSC" (German: Ha-Ho-He, es gibt nur zwei Mannschaften an der Spree – Union und Hertha BSC) and "Hertha and Union – one nation" (German: Hertha und Union – eine Nation) became popular among the two sets of supporters. The two sets of supporters came together for the first time after the opening of the Berlin Wall during the first edition of the indoor tournament "Internationales Berliner Hallenfußballturnier" in the Werner-Seelenbinder-Halle on 18–20 January 1990. Supporters of Union and Hertha now also sang xenophobic and nationalist chants. The teams of Hertha BSC and 1. FC Union Berlin also met in the tournament on 19 January 1990. It was the first ever meeting between the two sides. Hertha BSC won the match 3–2 in front of 4,000 spectators in Werner-Seelenbinder-Halle.

On 27 January 1990, 79 days after the fall of the Berlin Wall, Hertha hosted Union Berlin at the Olympiastadion in a friendly in front of 52,000 spectators. Fans of both clubs paid for admission in East and West Germany's respective currencies, and sang songs of German reunification, as Hertha won 2–1. Over twenty years later, on 17 September 2010, the duo faced each other for the first time in a competitive meeting, at the Stadion An der Alten Försterei, drawing 1–1 in the 2. Bundesliga. On 2 November 2019, Union Berlin faced Hertha at the Stadion An der Alten Försterei, in the first meeting between the clubs in German football's top flight. An 87th minute Sebastian Polter penalty secured a 1–0 win for Union, in a game temporarily suspended by referee Deniz Aytekin, following fireworks thrown by Hertha fans, which landed amongst Union Berlin fans, as well as on the playing surface. 1,100 police officers were on duty for the game, with Hertha fans burning Union Berlin shirts, flags and scarves during the game. Hertha supporters had also been joined by 20–25 supporters of BFC Dynamo in the guest block. Following full time, Union Berlin goalkeeper Rafał Gikiewicz won praise from fans and media alike after ushering Union Berlin ultras from the field of play, following a minor pitch invasion devised to attack Hertha supporters.

Union Berlin also holds rivalries with Hansa Rostock, Dynamo Dresden, and Magdeburg, dating to when the teams competed in the DDR-Oberliga.

More recently, the club has developed a rivalry with RB Leipzig, following the takeover of license and teams from fifth division side SSV Markranstädt financed by Red Bull GmbH and the ascension by Leipzig to the Bundesliga system. In 2011, Union Berlin ran adverts against the investment of the club whilst also cancelling a pre-season friendly with the club. On 21 September 2014, Union Berlin fans staged a silent protest for the first 15 minutes of a 2. Bundesliga home game against RB Leipzig, labelling RB Leipzig a "marketing product pushed by financial interests" with "brainwashed consumers in the stands". Union Berlin won the game 2–1. On 18 August 2019, during Union Berlin's first ever Bundesliga game, at home against RB Leipzig, the club's oldest ultras group, the Wuhlesyndikat, successfully called for a 15-minute silent protest at the start of the club's 2019–20 opener.

=== Songs ===
The official Union Berlin song is "Eisern Union" by German punk singer Nina Hagen. The composition was recorded in 1998, with an intro added in 2006 using the opening of Rammstein's song Rammstein. Four versions were issued on a CD single by G.I.B Music and Distribution GmbH.

The famous supporters' chant 'Eisern Union' (Iron Union) bounces back and forth between the terraces named Waldseite and the Gegengerade, and is followed by mutual acknowledging applause.

=== Christmas tradition ===
Union Berlin is also well known for its Christmas traditions celebrated in their home stadium. In 2003, the yearly Union Weihnachtssingen started as an unofficial gathering to which just 89 fans showed up. In 2013, 27,500 people attended, including players and supporters of other teams from around Germany and Europe. Fans drink Glühwein (mulled wine), wave candles around, light flares and sing a combination of Christmas carols and football chants.

=== Mascot ===
Ritter Keule (literally: Cudgel the Knight) is the mascot of Union Berlin. He was first introduced in 2000.

=== Movies and games ===
Union fürs Leben (Union for life) is a 2014 documentary film that showcases the supporters passion for 1. FC Union Berlin.

== Honours ==
=== Domestic ===
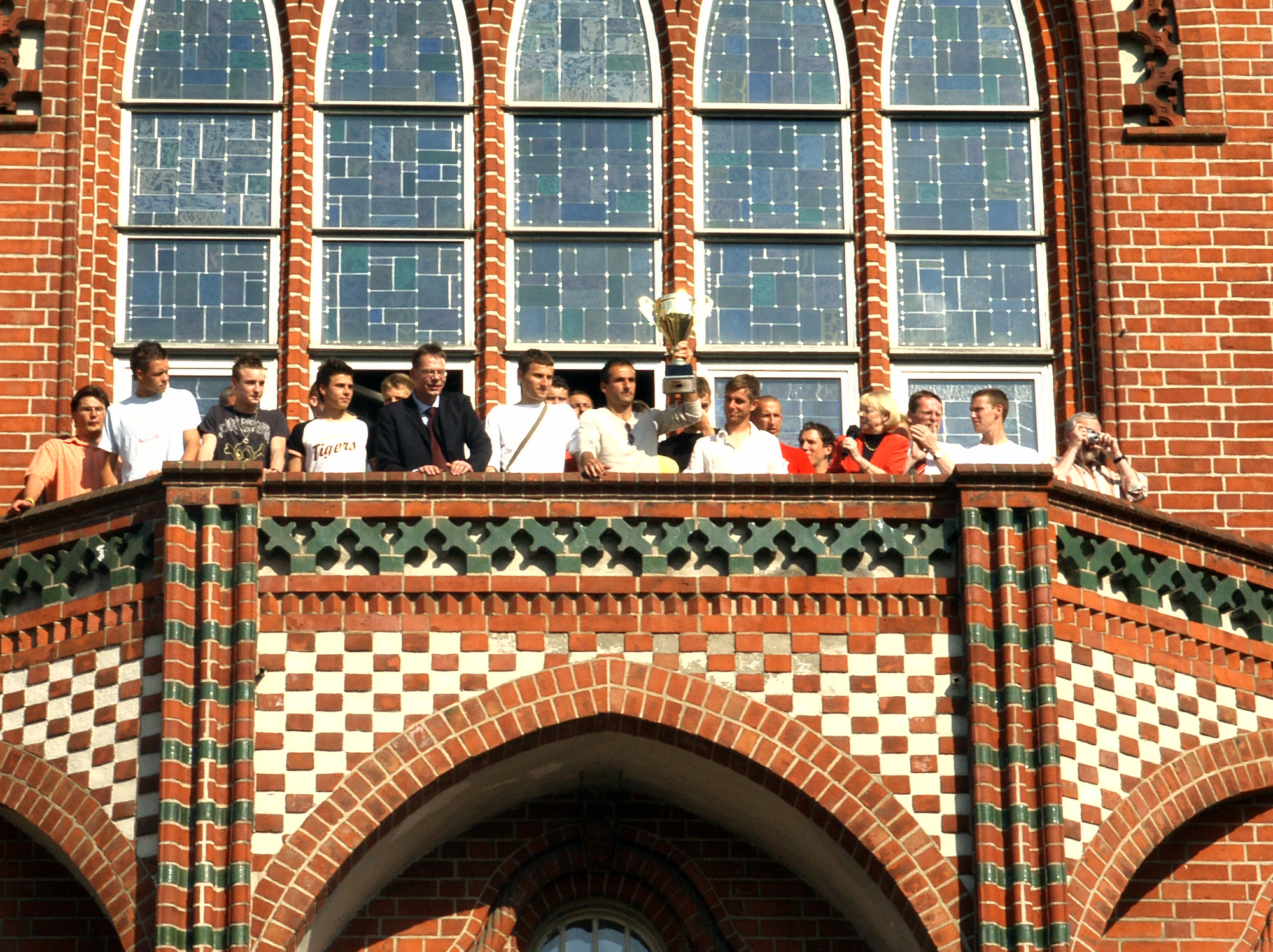
The team celebrates their Berlin Cup victory at the Köpenick town hall in 2007.

- German Football Championship
  - Runners-up: 1923 (Note: Won by SC Union Oberschöneweide.)
- DDR-Liga Nord (II)
  - Winners: 1965–66, 1969–70
  - Runners-up: 1963–64 (Note: Won by TSC Berlin.)
- DDR-Liga B (II)
  - Winners: 1973–74, 1974–75, 1975–76, 1980–81, 1981–82
- DDR-Liga A (II)
  - Winners: 1984–85, 1990–91
  - Runners-up: 1989–90
- 3. Liga (III)
  - Winners 2008–09
- II. DDR-Liga I (III)
  - Winners: 1961–62 (Note: Won by TSC Oberschöneweide.)
- DFB-Pokal
  - Runners-up: 2000–01
- FDGB-Pokal:
  - Winners: 1967–68
  - Runners-up: 1985–86

=== Regional ===
- Berlin/Brandenburg Champions (−1933)
  - Winners: 1920, (Note: Won by SC Union Oberschöneweide.) (Note: VBB-Verbandsliga, organized by football association Verband Brandenburgischer Ballspielvereine (VBB).) 1923 (Note: VBB-Oberliga, organized by football association Verband Brandenburgischer Ballspielvereine (VBB).)
  - Runners-up: 1917, 1925
- Gauliga Berlin-Brandenburg:
  - Winners: 1940
- Oberliga Berlin (1945–63):
  - Winners: 1947–48 (Note: Won by SG Oberschöneweide.)
  - Runners-up: 1949–50
- NOFV-Oberliga Mitte (III)
  - Winners: 1991–92, 1992–93, 1993–94
- Regionalliga Nordost (III)
  - Winners: 1999–2000
  - Runners-up: 1995–96
- Regionalliga Nord (III)
  - Winners: 2000–01
- NOFV-Oberliga Nord (IV)
  - Winner: 2005–06
- Berlin Cup (Tiers III–VII)
  - Winners: 1947, 1948, 1994, 2007, 2009
  - Runners-up: 1926, 1997

=== Youth ===
- East German Youth Championship (Jugendmeisterschaften der DDR (Fußball)) (Note: Corresponds to U17 level.)
  - Runners-up: 1985, 1988
- East German Junior Cup (Junge Welt-Pokal) (Junge Welt-Pokal) (Note: Corresponds to U19 level.)
  - Winners: 1960 (Note: Won by TSC Oberschöneweide.)

== See also ==
- Football in Germany
- Football in Berlin
- Sport in Berlin
