= List of 1. FC Union Berlin seasons =

This is a list of 1. FC Union Berlin seasons in German football, from their first competitive season after German reunification in 1990. It details the club's achievements in major competitions, and the top scorers for each season.

== Recent seasons (from 1991 onwards) ==
Year	Division	Position	Points	Goal difference	Top goalscorer(s)	Cup	Europe
1991–92	NOFV-Oberliga Mitte (III)	1st	69:7	+77	(Germany) Matthias Zimmerling 20		
1992–93	NOFV-Oberliga Mitte (III)	1st	54:10	+79	(Poland) Jacek Mencel 24		
1993–94	NOFV-Oberliga Mitte (III)	1st	54:6	+96	(North Macedonia) Goran Markov 21		
1994–95	Regionalliga Nordost (III)	3rd	47:21	+39	(North Macedonia) Goran Markov 20	R64	
1995–96	Regionalliga Nordost (III)	2nd	72	+49	(Bosnia and Herzegovina) Sergej Barbarez 17		
1996–97	Regionalliga Nordost (III)	5th	62	+14	(Germany) Norman Struck 10		
1997–98	Regionalliga Nordost (III)	6th	54	+10	(Germany) Nico Patschinski 9		
1998–99	Regionalliga Nordost (III)	6th	57	+30	(Germany) Steffen Menze 14		
1999–2000	Regionalliga Nordost (III)	1st	77	+30	(Germany) Steffen Menze 13		
2000–01	Regionalliga Nord (III)	1st	73	+39	(Brazil) Daniel Teixeira 18	RU	
2001–02	2. Bundesliga (II)	6th	56	+20	(Serbia) Sreto Ristić 14, (Bulgaria) Kostadin Vidolov 10, (Albania) Harun Isa 9, (Spain) Cristian Fiél 7, (Serbia) Petar Divić 7, (Germany) Steffen Menze 6	R16	UC R64
2002–03	2. Bundesliga (II)	9th	45	−12	(Germany) Steffen Baumgart 9, (Bulgaria) Kostadin Vidolov 6, (Senegal) Salif Keita 5, (Serbia) Sreto Ristić 5	R32	
2003–04	2. Bundesliga (II)	17th	33	−10	(Germany) Steffen Baumgart 13, (Senegal) Salif Keita 8, (Germany) Thomas Sobotzik 7	R32	
2004–05	Regionalliga Nord (III)	19th	27	−18	(United States) Ryan Coiner 12	R64	
2005–06	NOFV-Oberliga Nord (IV)	1st	69	+51	(Brazil) Daniel Teixeira 24		
2006–07	Regionalliga Nord (III)	12th	48	+6	(Algeria) Karim Benyamina 11		
2007–08	Regionalliga Nord (III)	4th	60	+18	(Germany) Nico Patschinski 13	R64	
2008–09	3. Liga (III)	1st	78	+36	(Algeria) Karim Benyamina 16		
2009–10	2. Bundesliga (II)	12th	44	−3	(Germany) Torsten Mattuschka 10, (Colombia) John Jairo Mosquera 7, (Algeria) Karim Benyamina 6, (Germany) Hüzeyfe Doğan 5, (Germany) Kenan Şahin 5	R64	
2010–11	2. Bundesliga (II)	11th	42	−6	(Colombia) John Jairo Mosquera 8, (Algeria) Karim Benyamina 7, (Germany) Torsten Mattuschka 5	R64	
2011–12	2. Bundesliga (II)	7th	48	−3	(Germany) Simon Terodde 8, (Brazil) Silvio 8, (Germany) Chinedu Ede 7, (Germany) Christopher Quiring 6, (Colombia) John Jairo Mosquera 6, (Germany) Torsten Mattuschka 5	R64	
2012–13	2. Bundesliga (II)	7th	49	+1	(Germany) Simon Terodde 10, (Germany) Torsten Mattuschka 10, (Slovakia) Adam Nemec 9	R32	
2013–14	2. Bundesliga (II)	9th	44	+1	(Germany) Torsten Mattuschka 12, (Germany) Sören Brandy 11, (Germany) Simon Terodde 5, (Slovakia) Adam Nemec 5	R16	
2014–15	2. Bundesliga (II)	7th	47	-5	(Germany) Sebastian Polter 14, (Croatia) Damir Kreilach 7	R64	
2015–16	2. Bundesliga (II)	6th	49	+6	(United States) Bobby Wood 17, (Croatia) Damir Kreilach 12, (Germany) Benjamin Kessel 6	R64	
2016–17	2. Bundesliga (II)	4th	60	+12	(Croatia) Damir Kreilach 9, (Germany) Steven Skrzybski 8, (Germany) Sebastian Polter 7, (Germany) Collin Quaner 7, (Austria) Philipp Hosiner 6	R32	
2017–18	2. Bundesliga (II)	8th	47	+8	(Germany) Steven Skrzybski 14, (Germany) Sebastian Polter 12	R32	
2018–19	2. Bundesliga (II)	3rd	57	+21	(Sweden) Sebastian Andersson 14, (Germany) Sebastian Polter 9, (Germany) Grischa Prömel 7, (Germany) Akaki Gogia 6, (Germany) Joshua Mees 6	R32	
2019–20	Bundesliga (I)	11th	41	−17	(Sweden) Sebastian Andersson 12, (Germany) Marius Bülter 7, (Denmark) Marcus Ingvartsen 5	QF	
2020–21	Bundesliga (I)	7th	50	+7	(Germany) Max Kruse 11, (Finland) Joel Pohjanpalo 6, (Germany) Marvin Friedrich 5, (Germany) Robert Andrich 5, (Nigeria) Taiwo Awoniyi 5	R32	
2021–22	Bundesliga (I)	5th	57	+6	(Nigeria) Taiwo Awoniyi 15, (Germany) Grischa Prömel 8, (Germany) Max Kruse 5	SF	UECL GS
2022–23	Bundesliga (I)	4th	62	+13	(Suriname) Sheraldo Becker 11, (Germany) Kevin Behrens 8, (Netherlands) Danilho Doekhi 5, (Germany) Janik Haberer 5	QF	UEL R16
2023–24	Bundesliga (I)	15th	33	−25	(Germany) Robin Gosens 6, (Germany) Benedict Hollerbach 5, (Germany) Kevin Behrens 4	R32	UCL GS
2024–25	Bundesliga (I)	13th	40	−16	(Germany) Benedict Hollerbach 9	R32	
2025–26	Bundesliga (I)	11th	40	−9	R32		
