= 2022–23 1. FC Union Berlin season =

Union Berlin
2022–23 season
- President: Dirk Zingler
- Head coach: Urs Fischer
- Stadium: Stadion An der Alten Försterei
- Bundesliga: 4th
- DFB-Pokal: Quarter-finals
- UEFA Europa League: Round of 16
- Top goalscorer: League: Sheraldo Becker (11); All: Sheraldo Becker (12)
- Biggest win: 6–1 vs Schalke 04
- Biggest defeat: 0–5 vs Bayer Leverkusen
Home colours	Away colours	Third colours

The 2022–23 season was the 57th in the history of 1. FC Union Berlin and their fourth consecutive season in the top flight. The club participated in the Bundesliga, the DFB-Pokal, and the UEFA Europa League.

== Players ==
=== Squad ===
As of 30 January 2023

Note: Flags indicate national team as defined under FIFA eligibility rules; some limited exceptions apply. Players may hold more than one non-FIFA nationality.

No.	Pos.	Nation	Player
1	GK	DEN	Frederik Rønnow
2	MF	NOR	Morten Thorsby
3	DF	GER	Paul Jaeckel
4	DF	POR	Diogo Leite (on loan from Porto)
5	DF	NED	Danilho Doekhi
7	MF	GER	Levin Öztunalı
8	MF	GER	Rani Khedira (vice-captain)
11	FW	GER	Sven Michel
12	GK	DEN	Jakob Busk
13	MF	HUN	András Schäfer
14	MF	GER	Paul Seguin
16	FW	GER	Tim Maciejewski
17	FW	GER	Kevin Behrens
18	DF	CRO	Josip Juranović

No.	Pos.	Nation	Player
19	MF	GER	Janik Haberer
20	MF	TUN	Aïssa Laïdouni
23	DF	GER	Niko Gießelmann
25	DF	GER	Timo Baumgartl (on loan from PSV Eindhoven)
26	DF	GLP	Jérôme Roussillon
27	FW	SUR	Sheraldo Becker
28	DF	AUT	Christopher Trimmel (captain)
30	MF	GER	Kevin Möhwald
31	DF	GER	Robin Knoche
32	MF	SRB	Miloš Pantović
37	GK	GER	Lennart Grill (on loan from Bayer Leverkusen)
40	FW	GER	Jamie Leweling
45	FW	USA	Jordan Pefok

=== Out on loan ===
Note: Flags indicate national team as defined under FIFA eligibility rules; some limited exceptions apply. Players may hold more than one non-FIFA nationality.

No.	Pos.	Nation	Player
—	DF	GER	Dominique Heintz (on loan to VfL Bochum until 30 June 2023)
—	DF	NED	Rick van Drongelen (on loan to Hansa Rostock until 30 June 2023)
—	MF	GER	Laurenz Dehl (on loan to Viktoria Berlin until 30 June 2023)
—	MF	JPN	Keita Endo (on loan to Eintracht Braunschweig until 30 June 2023)

== Transfers ==
=== In ===
No.	Pos	Player	Transferred from	Fee	Date	Source
32	FW	(Serbia) Miloš Pantović	(Germany) VfL Bochum	Free	1 July 2022	
19	MF	(Germany) Janik Haberer	(Germany) SC Freiburg	Free	1 July 2022	
37	GK	(Germany) Lennart Grill	(Germany) Bayer Leverkusen	Loan	1 July 2022	
26	DF	(France) Jérôme Roussillon	(Germany) VfL Wolfsburg	Undisclosed	12 January 2023	
18	DF	(Croatia) Josip Juranović	(Scotland) Celtic	€8,500,000	22 January 2023	
20	MF	(Tunisia) Aïssa Laïdouni	(Hungary) Ferencváros	€4,100,000	27 January 2023	

=== Out ===
No.	Pos	Player	Transferred to	Fee	Date	Source
14	FW	(Nigeria) Taiwo Awoniyi	(England) Nottingham Forest	€17,000,000	1 July 2022	
21	MF	(Germany) Grischa Prömel	(Germany) 1899 Hoffenheim	Free	1 July 2022	
33	DF	(Germany) Dominique Heintz	(Germany) VfL Bochum	Loan	11 August 2022	
6	DF	(Norway) Julian Ryerson	(Germany) Borussia Dortmund	€5,000,000	17 January 2023	
24	MF	(Japan) Genki Haraguchi	(Germany) VfB Stuttgart	€1,000,000	30 January 2023	

== Pre-season and friendlies ==
Win Draw Loss Fixtures

2 July 2022 Friendly	1. FC Magdeburg	1–4	Union Berlin	Magdeburg
16:30 CEST (UTC+2)	Atik 33'	Report	Voglsammer 1'; Behrens 8'; Endo 54'; Skarke 87'	Stadium: MDCC-Arena; Attendance: 7,955

6 July 2022 Friendly	Eintracht Braunschweig	1–0	Union Berlin	Braunschweig, Germany
18:00 CEST (UTC+2)	Pherai 55'	Report		Stadium: Eintracht-Stadion; Attendance: 4,432

9 July 2022 Friendly	Union Berlin	2–1	Bohemians	Berlin, Germany
15:30 CEST (UTC+2)	Doekhi 12'; Voglsammer 68'	Report	Coote 74'	Stadium: Stadion An der Alten Försterei; Attendance: 15,932

15 July 2022 Friendly	Union Berlin	1–0	České Budějovice	Neukirchen am Großvenediger, Austria
14:30 CEST (UTC+2)	Seguin 37'	Report		Stadium: Sportplatz Neukirchen am Großvenediger; Attendance: 500

16 July 2022 Friendly	Union Berlin	3–3	Udinese	Lienz, Austria
15:15 CEST (UTC+2)	Khedira 44', (yellow card) 51'; Nuytinck 49' (o.g.); Schäfer (yellow card) 50'; Heintz (yellow card) 54'; Knoche 63'	Report	Nestorovski 25', 43', (yellow card) 74'; Benković 55'; Walace (yellow card) 57'	Stadium: Dolomitenstadion; Referee: Marco Schlacher (Austria)

23 July 2022 Friendly	Union Berlin	1–0	Nottingham Forest	Berlin, Germany
17:00 CEST (UTC+2)	Pefok 36'	Report		Stadium: Stadion An der Alten Försterei; Attendance: 15,467

9 August 2022 Friendly	Union Berlin	1–1	Hannover 96	Berlin, Germany
16:15 CEST (UTC+2)	Behrens 87'	Report	Tresoldi 54'	Stadium: Friedrich-Ludwig-Jahn-Sportpark; Attendance: 825

14 December 2022 Friendly	Union Berlin	2–0	Hansa Rostock	Berlin, Germany
16:00 CET (UTC+1)	Becker 56', 60'	Report		Stadium: Stadion An der Alten Försterei; Attendance: 11,931

7 January 2023 Friendly	Union Berlin	1–0	FC Augsburg	Orihuela Costa, Spain
13:00 CET (UTC+1)	Pefok 57' (pen.)	Report		Stadium: Real Club de Golf Campoamor Campo 1 Attendance: 300

7 January 2023 Friendly	Union Berlin	4–1	FC Augsburg	Orihuela Costa, Spain
15:00 CET (UTC+1)	Michel 12', 39'; Leweling 26'; Behrens 35'	Report	Petkov 81'	Stadium: Real Club de Golf Campoamor Campo 1 Attendance: 400

14 January 2023 Friendly	Union Berlin	3–1	Žilina	Berlin, Germany
15:30 CET (UTC+1)	Haraguchi 21'; Doekhi 43'; Behrens 80'	Report	Jambor 28' (pen.)	Stadium: Stadion An der Alten Försterei; Attendance: 3,618

== Competitions ==
=== Overall record ===
Competition	First match	Last match	Starting round	Final position	Record							
Competition	First match	Last match	Starting round	Final position	Pld	W	D	L	GF	GA	GD	Win %
Bundesliga	6 August 2022	27 May 2023	Matchday 1	4th	34	18	8	8	51	38	+13	52.94
DFB-Pokal	1 August 2022	4 April 2023	First round	Quarter-finals	4	3	0	1	6	4	+2	75.00
UEFA Europa League	8 September 2022	16 March 2023	Group stage	Round of 16	10	5	2	3	10	9	+1	50.00
Total					48	26	10	12	67	51	+16	54.17

Source: Soccerway

=== Bundesliga ===
==== League table ====
Pos	Team	Pld	W	D	L	GF	GA	GD	Pts	Qualification or relegation
2	Borussia Dortmund	34	22	5	7	83	44	+39	71	Qualification for the Champions League group stage
3	RB Leipzig	34	20	6	8	64	41	+23	66	Qualification for the Champions League group stage
4	Union Berlin	34	18	8	8	51	38	+13	62	Qualification for the Champions League group stage
5	SC Freiburg	34	17	8	9	51	44	+7	59	Qualification for the Europa League group stage (Note: Since the 2022–23 DFB-Pokal winners, RB Leipzig, qualified for the Champions League based on league position, the Europa League group stage spot was passed to the sixth-placed team, and the Europa Conference League play-off round spot was passed to the seventh-placed team.)
6	Bayer Leverkusen	34	14	8	12	57	49	+8	50	Qualification for the Europa League group stage

Source: DFB
Rules for classification: 1) Points; 2) Goal difference; 3) Goals scored; 4) Head-to-head results; 5) Head-to-head away goals scored; 6) Away goals scored; 7) Play-off.

==== Results summary ====
Overall								Home						Away					
Pld	W	D	L	GF	GA	GD	Pts	W	D	L	GF	GA	GD	W	D	L	GF	GA	GD
34	18	8	8	51	38	+13	62	11	6	0	30	11	+19	7	2	8	21	27	−6

Source: DFB

==== Results by round ====
Round	1	2	3	4	5	6	7	8	9	10	11	12	13	14	15	16	17	18	19	20	21	22	23	24	25	26	27	28	29	30	31	32	33	34
Ground	H	A	H	A	H	A	H	A	A	H	A	H	A	H	A	H	A	A	H	A	H	A	H	A	H	H	A	H	A	H	A	H	A	H
Result	W	D	W	W	D	W	W	L	W	W	L	W	L	D	L	W	W	W	W	W	D	L	D	D	W	W	L	D	W	D	L	W	L	W
Position	3	5	3	2	4	1	1	1	1	1	1	1	3	2	5	3	2	2	2	2	3	3	3	4	3	3	3	3	3	3	4	4	4	4

Source: DFB
A = Away; H = Home; W = Win; D = Draw; L = Loss

==== Matches ====
The league fixtures were announced on 17 June 2022.

6 August 2022 1	Union Berlin	3–1	Hertha BSC	Berlin
15:30 CEST (UTC+2)	Pefok 31'; Knoche (yellow card) 35', (goal) 54'; Becker 50'; Leweling (yellow card) 90+3'	Report	Uremović (yellow card) 52'; Šunjić (yellow card) 77'; Lukebakio 85', (yellow card) 87'	Stadium: Stadion An der Alten Försterei; Attendance: 22,012; Referee: Marco Fritz

14 August 2022 2	Mainz 05	0–0	Union Berlin	Mainz
15:30 CEST (UTC+2)	Onisiwo (yellow card) 5'	Report		Stadium: Mewa Arena; Attendance: 25,009; Referee: Daniel Schlager

20 August 2022 3	Union Berlin	2–1	RB Leipzig	Berlin
18:30 CEST (UTC+2)	Pefok 32'; Becker 38'; Rønnow (yellow card) 49'; Behrens (yellow card) 65'	Report	Kampl (yellow card) 30'; Orbán 83'	Stadium: Stadion An der Alten Försterei; Attendance: 21,056; Referee: Deniz Aytekin

27 August 2022 4	Schalke 04	1–6	Union Berlin	Gelsenkirchen
15:30 CEST (UTC+2)	Bülter 31' (pen.); Thiaw (yellow card) 45'	Report	Thorsby 6'; Becker 36', 46'; Haberer 45+3'; Michel 87', 90'	Stadium: Veltins-Arena; Attendance: 62,271; Referee: Robert Hartmann

3 September 2022 5	Union Berlin	1–1	Bayern Munich	Berlin
15:30 CEST (UTC+2)	Becker 12'; Khedira (yellow card) 87'	Report	Kimmich 15', (yellow card) 26'; Gravenberch (yellow card) 72'	Stadium: Stadion An der Alten Försterei; Attendance: 22,012; Referee: Frank Willenborg

11 September 2022 6	1. FC Köln	0–1	Union Berlin	Cologne
15:30 CEST (UTC+2)	Kilian (yellow card) 9' (yellow-red card) 81'; Pedersen (yellow card) 54'; Schindler (yellow card) 72'	Report	Hübers 3' (o.g.); Pefok (penalty missed) 10'; Knoche (yellow card) 53'	Stadium: RheinEnergieStadion; Attendance: 49,500; Referee: Benjamin Cortus

18 September 2022 7	Union Berlin	2–0	VfL Wolfsburg	Berlin
15:30 CEST (UTC+2)	Pefok 54'; Becker 77'	Report		Stadium: Stadion An der Alten Försterei; Attendance: 22,012; Referee: Robert Schröder

1 October 2022 8	Eintracht Frankfurt	2–0	Union Berlin	Frankfurt
15:30 CEST (UTC+2)	Götze 12'; Lindstrøm 42'; Kolo Muani (yellow card) 43' (yellow-red card) 68'; Rode (yellow card) 57'	Report	Becker (yellow card) 19'; Khedira (yellow card) 65'; Michel (yellow card) 74'; Giesselmann (yellow card) 77'	Stadium: Waldstadion; Attendance: 50,500; Referee: Sascha Stegemann

9 October 2022 9	VfB Stuttgart	0–1	Union Berlin	Stuttgart
19:30 CEST (UTC+2)	Karazor (yellow card) 58'; Guirassy (yellow card) 78' (yellow-red card) 82'	Report	Gießelmann (yellow card) 66'; Jaeckel 76'; Khedira (yellow card) 78'; Seguin (yellow card) 90+3'	Stadium: Mercedes-Benz Arena; Attendance: 43,250; Referee: Bastian Dankert

16 October 2022 10	Union Berlin	2–0	Borussia Dortmund	Berlin
17:30 CEST (UTC+2)	Haberer 8', 21'; Baumgartl (yellow card) 16'	Report	Özcan (yellow card) 29'; Schlotterbeck (yellow card) 55'	Stadium: Stadion An der Alten Försterei; Attendance: 22,012; Referee: Tobias Stieler

23 October 2022 11	VfL Bochum	2–1	Union Berlin	Bochum
15:30 CEST (UTC+2)	Ordets (yellow card) 17'; Hofmann 43'; Holtmann 71'	Report	Jaeckel (yellow card) 35'; Ryerson (yellow card) 70'; Pantović (penalty missed) 78', 90+3'; Skarke (yellow card) 78'	Stadium: Vonovia Ruhrstadion; Attendance: 25,460; Referee: Deniz Aytekin

30 October 2022 12	Union Berlin	2–1	Borussia Mönchengladbach	Berlin
15:30 CEST (UTC+2)	Michel (yellow card) 64'; Behrens 79'; Ryerson (yellow card) 90+1'; Trimmel (yellow card) 90+5'; Doekhi 90+7'	Report	Elvedi 33'; Thuram (yellow card) 67'; Sippel (yellow card) 79'	Stadium: Stadion An der Alten Försterei; Attendance: 22,012; Referee: Harm Osmers

6 November 2022 13	Bayer Leverkusen	5–0	Union Berlin	Leverkusen
15:30 CET (UTC+1)	Amiri (yellow card) 19'; Andrich 46'; Diaby 56', 58'; Hložek 68'; Bakker 76'	Report	Khedira (yellow card) 24'; Pefok (yellow card) 26'; Thorsby (yellow card) 41'; Leite (yellow card) 85'	Stadium: BayArena; Attendance: 30,210; Referee: Robert Schröder

9 November 2022 14	Union Berlin	2–2	FC Augsburg	Berlin
20:30 CET (UTC+1)	Becker 7'; Khedira (yellow card) 12'; Behrens 22'	Report	Niederlechner 8', 39'; Gumny (yellow card) 20'; Bauer (yellow card) 21'; Demirović (yellow card) 25'; Gouweleeuw (yellow card) 47'	Stadium: Stadion An der Alten Försterei; Attendance: 21,614; Referee: Sascha Stegemann

13 November 2022 15	SC Freiburg	4–1	Union Berlin	Freiburg
17:30 CET (UTC+1)	Grifo 4' (pen.), 6', 20' (pen.); Gregoritsch 45+1'	Report	Knoche (penalty missed) 9'; Leite (red card) 19'; Pantović (yellow card) 79'; Michel 84' (pen.)	Stadium: Europa-Park Stadion; Attendance: 33,800; Referee: Deniz Aytekin

21 January 2023 16	Union Berlin	3–1	1899 Hoffenheim	Berlin
15:30 CET (UTC+1)	Pefok (penalty missed) 25'; Gießelmann (yellow card) 45+2'; Doekhi 73', 89'; Seguin (yellow card) 90+2'; Leweling 90+6'	Report	Bebou 43'; Kabak (yellow card) 45+3'	Stadium: Stadion An der Alten Försterei; Attendance: 21,747; Referee: Robert Hartmann

25 January 2023 17	Werder Bremen	1–2	Union Berlin	Bremen
20:30 CET (UTC+1)	Pieper 14'	Report	Haberer 18'; Behrens 46'	Stadium: Weserstadion; Attendance: 41,500; Referee: Bastian Dankert

28 January 2023 18	Hertha BSC	0–2	Union Berlin	Berlin
15:30 CET (UTC+1)	Boateng (yellow card) 90+4'	Report	Doekhi 44'; Khedira (yellow card) 49'; Seguin 67', (yellow card) 90'	Stadium: Olympiastadion; Attendance: 74,667; Referee: Felix Brych

4 February 2023 19	Union Berlin	2–1	Mainz 05	Berlin
15:30 CET (UTC+1)	Behrens 32'; Seguin (yellow card) 72'; Pefok 84'	Report	Ajorque (yellow card) 45'; Ingvartsen 78' (pen.)	Stadium: Stadion An der Alten Försterei; Attendance: 22,012; Referee: Florian Badstübner

11 February 2023 20	RB Leipzig	1–2	Union Berlin	Leipzig
18:30 CET (UTC+1)	Henrichs 24'; Halstenberg (yellow card) 60'; Schlager (yellow card) 69'; Werner (yellow card) 81'; Poulsen (yellow card) 88'	Report	Knoche (yellow card) 57', (goal) 72' (pen.); Haberer 61'; Laïdouni (yellow card) 65'; Pefok (yellow card) 90+1'; Leite (yellow card) 90+5'	Stadium: Red Bull Arena; Attendance: 47,069; Referee: Daniel Schlager

19 February 2023 21	Union Berlin	0–0	Schalke 04	Berlin
15:30 CET (UTC+1)	Behrens (yellow card) 32'; Gießelmann (yellow card) 55'	Report	Jenz (yellow card) 22'	Stadium: Stadion An der Alten Försterei; Attendance: 22,012; Referee: Tobias Reichel

26 February 2023 22	Bayern Munich	3–0	Union Berlin	Munich
17:30 CET (UTC+1)	Choupo-Moting 31'; Coman 40'; Musiala 45+1'; Pavard (yellow card) 84'	Report	Thorsby (yellow card) 33'	Stadium: Allianz Arena; Attendance: 75,000; Referee: Marco Fritz

4 March 2023 23	Union Berlin	0–0	1. FC Köln	Berlin
15:30 CET (UTC+1)	Pefok (yellow card) 90+2'	Report		Stadium: Stadion An der Alten Försterei; Attendance: 22,012; Referee: Tobias Stieler

12 March 2023 27	VfL Wolfsburg	1–1	Union Berlin	Wolfsburg
19:30 CET (UTC+1)	Bornauw (yellow card) 73'; Wimmer 84'	Report	Khedira (yellow card) 6'; Thorsby (yellow card) 14'; Juranović 72' (pen.); Leite (yellow card) 75'; Behrens (yellow card) 90+4'	Stadium: Volkswagen Arena; Attendance: 23,554; Referee: Robert Schröder

19 March 2023 25	Union Berlin	2–0	Eintracht Frankfurt	Berlin
15:30 CET (UTC+1)	Khedira 53'; Doekhi (yellow card) 60'; Behrens 75'; Roussillon (yellow card) 77'; Rønnow (yellow card) 90+1'	Report	Tuta (yellow card) 57'; Kolo Muani (yellow card) 83'	Stadium: Stadion An der Alten Försterei; Attendance: 22,012; Referee: Christian Dingert

1 April 2023 26	Union Berlin	3–0	VfB Stuttgart	Berlin
15:30 CEST (UTC+2)	Leite (yellow card) 28'; Becker 51'; Behrens 65'; Haraguchi 68' (o.g.)	Report	Haraguchi (yellow card) 23'	Stadium: Stadion An der Alten Försterei; Attendance: 22,012; Referee: Florian Badstübner

8 April 2023 27	Borussia Dortmund	2–1	Union Berlin	Dortmund
15:30 CEST (UTC+2)	Süle (yellow card) 1'; Adeyemi (yellow card) 16'; Malen 28'; Moukoko 79'; Reus (yellow card) 90'; Can (yellow card) 90+1'; Bynoe-Gittens (yellow card) 90+5'	Report	Behrens (yellow card) 54', (goal) 61'; Becker (yellow card) 56'	Stadium: Signal Iduna Park; Attendance: 81,365; Referee: Daniel Schlager

16 April 2023 28	Union Berlin	1–1	VfL Bochum	Berlin
17:30 CEST (UTC+2)	Juranović 45+2'; Jaeckel (yellow card) 50' (yellow-red card) 61'	Report	Osterhage (yellow card) 28'; Stöger 55' (pen.)	Stadium: Stadion An der Alten Försterei; Attendance: 20,000; Referee: Tobias Stieler

23 April 2023 29	Borussia Mönchengladbach	0–1	Union Berlin	Mönchengladbach
19:30 CEST (UTC+2)	Itakura (yellow card) 8'; Neuhaus (yellow card) 24'; Elvedi (yellow card) 45'	Report	Laïdouni (yellow card) 33'; Behrens (yellow card) 35'; Becker 60'	Stadium: Borussia-Park; Attendance: 52,107; Referee: Martin Petersen

29 April 2023 30	Union Berlin	0–0	Bayer Leverkusen	Berlin
15:30 CEST (UTC+2)	Leite (yellow card) 64'	Report	Kossounou (yellow card) 74'	Stadium: Stadion An der Alten Försterei; Attendance: 22,012; Referee: Marco Fritz

6 May 2023 31	FC Augsburg	1–0	Union Berlin	Augsburg
15:30 CEST (UTC+2)	Engels (yellow card) 11'; Gouweleeuw (yellow card) 19'; Beljo 53'	Report	Laïdouni (yellow card) 64'; Jaeckel (yellow card) 72'	Stadium: WWK Arena; Attendance: 30,660; Referee: Florian Badstübner

13 May 2023 32	Union Berlin	4–2	SC Freiburg	Berlin
15:30 CEST (UTC+2)	Behrens 5', (yellow card) 33'; Khedira (yellow card) 15'; Becker 36', 38', (yellow card) 37'; Laïdouni 80'	Report	Gulde 56'; Grifo 70' (pen.); Gregoritsch (yellow card) 90+5'	Stadium: Stadion An der Alten Försterei; Attendance: 22,012; Referee: Marco Fritz

20 May 2023 33	1899 Hoffenheim	4–2	Union Berlin	Sinsheim
15:30 CEST (UTC+2)	Bebou 22'; Kramarić 36' (pen.), 90', (yellow card) 90+1'; Prömel (yellow card) 81'; Dabbur (yellow card) 90+8', (goal) 90+9'; Stiller (yellow card) 90+8'	Report	Leite (yellow card) 35'; Haberer (yellow card) 39'; Doekhi 45+4'; Baumgartl (yellow card) 79'; Roussillon (yellow card) 86'; Becker (yellow card) 87'; Laïdouni 90+5'	Stadium: PreZero Arena; Attendance: 30,000; Referee: Christian Dingert

27 May 2023 34	Union Berlin	1–0	Werder Bremen	Berlin
15:30 CEST (UTC+2)	Laïdouni (yellow card) 45'; Khedira 81'	Report	Philipp (yellow card) 49'; Pavlenka (yellow card) 68'; Bittencourt (yellow card) 71'	Stadium: Stadion An der Alten Försterei; Attendance: 22,012; Referee: Patrick Ittrich

=== DFB-Pokal ===
1 August 2022 First round	Chemnitzer FC	1–2 (a.e.t.)	Union Berlin	Chemnitz
18:01 CEST (UTC+2)	Müller 62'; Walther (yellow card) 102'	Report	Pefok 64'; Schäfer (yellow card) 111'; Behrens 114'	Stadium: Stadion an der Gellertstraße; Attendance: 13,465; Referee: Bastian Dankert

19 October 2022 Second round	Union Berlin	2–0	1. FC Heidenheim	Berlin
20:45 CEST (UTC+2)	Puchacz 7'; Michel 52'; Knoche (yellow card) 90'	Report	Mainka (yellow card) 29'; Geipl (yellow card) 62'	Stadium: Stadion An der Alten Försterei; Attendance: 20,500; Referee: Florian Badstübner

31 January 2023 Round of 16	Union Berlin	2–1	VfL Wolfsburg	Berlin
20:45 CET (UTC+1)	Knoche 12'; Khedira (yellow card) 42'; Gießelmann (yellow card) 42' (yellow-red card) 87'; Behrens 79'	Report	Waldschmidt 5'; Svanberg (yellow card) 57'; Van de Ven (yellow card) 77'; F. Nmecha (yellow card) 90+1'	Stadium: Stadion An der Alten Försterei; Attendance: 22,012; Referee: Sascha Stegemann

4 April 2023 Quarter-finals	Eintracht Frankfurt	2–0	Union Berlin	Frankfurt
18:00 CEST (UTC+2)	Kolo Muani 11', 13'	Report		Stadium: Waldstadion; Attendance: 50,000; Referee: Bastian Dankert

=== UEFA Europa League ===
==== Group stage ====
The draw for the group stage was held on 26 August 2022.

Pos	Team	Pld	W	D	L	GF	GA	GD	Pts	Qualification	USG	UBE	BRA	MAL
1	(Belgium) Union Saint-Gilloise	6	4	1	1	11	7	+4	13	Advance to round of 16	—	0–1	3–3	3–2
2	(Germany) Union Berlin	6	4	0	2	4	2	+2	12	Advance to knockout round play-offs	0–1	—	1–0	1–0
3	(Portugal) Braga	6	3	1	2	9	7	+2	10	Transfer to Europa Conference League	1–2	1–0	—	2–1
4	(Sweden) Malmö FF	6	0	0	6	3	11	−8	0		0–2	0–1	0–2	—

Source: UEFA
Rules for classification: Group stage tiebreakers

8 September 2022 1	Union Berlin (Germany)	0–1	(Belgium) Union Saint-Gilloise	Berlin
18:45 CEST (UTC+2)	Trimmel (yellow card) 51'; Schäfer (yellow card) 90'; Michel (red card) 90+4'	Report	Lynen 39'; Lapoussin (yellow card) 79'	Stadium: Stadion An der Alten Försterei; Attendance: 21,512; Referee: Serhiy Boyko (Ukraine)

15 September 2022 2	Braga (Portugal)	1–0	(Germany) Union Berlin	Braga, Portugal
22:00 WEST (UTC+1)	Banza (yellow card) 45+3'; A. Horta (yellow card) 71'; Vitinha 77'	Report	Schäfer (yellow card) 27'; Behrens (yellow card) 90'; Ryerson (yellow card) 90+5'	Stadium: Estádio Municipal; Attendance: 17,782; Referee: Filip Glova (Slovakia)

6 October 2022 3	Malmö FF (Sweden)	0–1	(Germany) Union Berlin	Malmö, Sweden
18:45 CEST (UTC+2)	Rakip (yellow card) 42'; Beijmo (yellow card) 73'	Report	Schäfer (red card) 45+1'; Becker 68'; Haberer (yellow card) 79'	Stadium: Eleda Stadion; Attendance: 16,057; Referee: Halil Umut Meler (Turkey)

13 October 2022 4	Union Berlin (Germany)	1–0	(Sweden) Malmö FF	Berlin
21:00 CEST (UTC+2)	Haberer (yellow card) 8'; Trimmel (yellow card) 29'; Knoche (yellow card) 61', (goal) 89' (pen.); Khedira (yellow card) 63'; Thorsby (yellow card) 72'	Report	Kiese Thelin (yellow card) 14'; Peña (yellow card) 36'; Olsson (yellow card) 77'; Knudsen (yellow card) 84'; Lomotey (yellow card) 87', (red card) 90'; Christiansen (yellow card) 87'	Stadium: Stadion An der Alten Försterei; Attendance: 21,800; Referee: Aleksandar Stavrev (North Macedonia)

27 October 2022 5	Union Berlin (Germany)	1–0	(Portugal) Braga	Berlin
18:45 CEST (UTC+2)	Thorsby (yellow card) 33'; Knoche 68' (pen.); Ryerson (yellow card) 72'; Rønnow (yellow card) 90+1'	Report	Fabiano (yellow card) 39'; Ruiz (yellow card) 45+2'; Castro (yellow card) 47'; A. Horta (yellow card) 90+6'	Stadium: Stadion An der Alten Försterei; Attendance: 21,082; Referee: Craig Pawson (England)

3 November 2022 6	Union Saint-Gilloise (Belgium)	0–1	(Germany) Union Berlin	Leuven, Belgium
21:00 CET (UTC+1)	Adingra (yellow card) 78'; Eckert (yellow card) 80'; Rodríguez (yellow card) 90+4'	Report	Michel 6'; Becker (yellow card) 9'; Haberer (yellow card) 48'; Trimmel (yellow card) 90+1'	Stadium: Den Dreef; Attendance: 5,597; Referee: Andris Treimanis (Latvia)
Note: The match was played at Den Dreef in Leuven, instead of Union Saint-Gilloise's regular stadium, the Joseph Marien Stadium in Brussels, which did not meet UEFA requirements.

==== Knockout phase ====
===== Knockout round play-offs =====
The draw for the knockout round play-offs was held on 7 November 2022.

16 February 2023 First leg	Ajax (Netherlands)	0–0	(Germany) Union Berlin	Amsterdam, Netherlands
18:45 CET (UTC+1)		Report	Khedira (yellow card) 57'; Doekhi (yellow card) 85'	Stadium: Johan Cruyff Arena; Attendance: 54,322; Referee: Halil Umut Meler (Turkey)

23 February 2023 Second leg	Union Berlin (Germany)	3–1 (3–1 agg.)	(Netherlands) Ajax	Berlin
21:00 CET (UTC+1)	Becker (yellow card) 20'; Knoche 20' (pen.); Doekhi (yellow card) 28', (goal) 50'; Juranović 44'	Report	Bassey (yellow card) 17'; Klaassen (yellow card) 20'; Kudus 47', (yellow card) 90+5'; Berghuis (yellow card) 90+2'; Álvarez (yellow card) 90+6' (yellow-red card) 90+7'; Tadić (yellow card) 90+6'	Stadium: Stadion An der Alten Försterei; Attendance: 21,800; Referee: Ricardo de Burgos Bengoetxea (Spain)

===== Round of 16 =====
The draw for the round of 16 was held on 24 February 2023.

9 March 2023 First leg	Union Berlin (Germany)	3–3	(Belgium) Union Saint-Gilloise	Berlin
18:45 CET (UTC+1)	Juranović 42'; Knoche (penalty missed) 69', 69', (yellow card) 75'; Gießelmann (yellow card) 85'; Michel 89'	Report	Vertessen (yellow card) 20', (goal) 58'; Boniface 28', 72'; Lynen (yellow card) 53'; Burgess (yellow card) 68'	Stadium: Stadion An der Alten Försterei; Attendance: 21,605; Referee: Orel Grinfeld (Israel)

16 March 2023 Second leg	Union Saint-Gilloise (Belgium)	3–0 (6–3 agg.)	(Germany) Union Berlin	Brussels, Belgium
21:00 CET (UTC+1)	Teuma 18'; Lazare 63'; Nieuwkoop (yellow card) 85'; Lapoussin 90+4'	Report	Leite (yellow card) 27'; Laïdouni (yellow card) 48'; Haberer (yellow card) 60' (yellow-red card) 80'; Khedira (yellow card) 90+4'	Stadium: Constant Vanden Stock Stadium; Attendance: 15,681; Referee: José María Sánchez Martínez (Spain)
Note: The match was played at the Constant Vanden Stock Stadium in Brussels, instead of Union Saint-Gilloise's regular stadium, the Joseph Marien Stadium, which did not meet UEFA requirements.

== Statistics ==
=== Appearances and goals ===
No.	Pos	Nat	Player	Total		Bundesliga		DFB-Pokal		Europa League	
No.	Pos	Nat	Player	Apps	Goals	Apps	Goals	Apps	Goals	Apps	Goals
Goalkeepers
1	GK	(Denmark) DEN	Frederik Rønnow	41	0	29	0	2	0	10	0
12	GK	(Denmark) DEN	Jakob Busk	0	0	0	0	0	0	0	0
37	GK	(Germany) GER	Lennart Grill	8	0	5	0	2	0	0+1	0
39	GK	(Germany) GER	Yannic Stein	0	0	0	0	0	0	0	0
Defenders
3	DF	(Germany) GER	Paul Jaeckel	21	1	13+3	1	1+1	0	3	0
4	DF	(Portugal) POR	Diogo Leite	40	0	26+2	0	3	0	9	0
5	DF	(Netherlands) NED	Danilho Doekhi	36	6	25	5	3	0	8	1
18	DF	(Croatia) CRO	Josip Juranović	18	4	10+2	2	2	0	4	2
23	DF	(Germany) GER	Niko Gießelmann	36	0	14+12	0	2+1	0	1+6	0
25	DF	(Germany) GER	Timo Baumgartl	8	0	6+2	0	0	0	0	0
26	DF	(France) FRA	Jérôme Roussillon	20	0	11+5	0	0+1	0	3	0
28	DF	(Austria) AUT	Christopher Trimmel	36	0	20+5	0	2	0	6+3	0
31	DF	(Germany) GER	Robin Knoche	46	7	32	2	4	1	10	4
Midfielders
2	MF	(Norway) NOR	Morten Thorsby	34	1	8+16	1	0+2	0	4+4	0
7	MF	(Germany) GER	Levin Öztunalı	2	0	0+2	0	0	0	0	0
8	MF	(Germany) GER	Rani Khedira	46	2	33	2	3	0	10	0
13	MF	(Hungary) HUN	András Schäfer	23	0	10+6	0	1+1	0	2+3	0
14	MF	(Germany) GER	Paul Seguin	25	1	4+16	1	3	0	2	0
19	MF	(Germany) GER	Janik Haberer	45	5	30+2	5	4	0	8+1	0
20	MF	(Tunisia) TUN	Aïssa Laïdouni	19	2	11+3	2	0+1	0	3+1	0
30	MF	(Germany) GER	Kevin Möhwald	0	0	0	0	0	0	0	0
32	MF	(Serbia) SRB	Miloš Pantović	14	1	0+13	1	0+1	0	0	0
35	MF	(Germany) GER	Fabio Schneider	0	0	0	0	0	0	0	0
36	MF	(Germany) GER	Aljoscha Kemlein	0	0	0	0	0	0	0	0
Forwards
11	FW	(Germany) GER	Sven Michel	29	6	2+19	3	1+1	1	2+4	2
16	FW	(Germany) GER	Tim Maciejewski	0	0	0	0	0	0	0	0
17	FW	(Germany) GER	Kevin Behrens	46	10	17+16	8	1+3	2	4+5	0
27	FW	(Suriname) SUR	Sheraldo Becker	48	12	33+1	11	4	0	10	1
40	FW	(Germany) GER	Jamie Leweling	25	1	0+16	1	0+2	0	0+7	0
45	FW	(United States) USA	Jordan Pefok	42	5	16+15	4	2+1	1	4+4	0
Players transferred out during the season
6	DF	(Norway) NOR	Julian Ryerson	21	0	12+1	0	1+1	0	5+1	0
26	DF	(Poland) POL	Tymoteusz Puchacz	3	1	1	0	1	1	1	0
33	DF	(Germany) GER	Dominique Heintz	1	0	0	0	1	0	0	0
24	MF	(Japan) JPN	Genki Haraguchi	19	0	6+5	0	1+1	0	3+3	0
9	FW	(Germany) GER	Andreas Voglsammer	1	0	0	0	0+1	0	0	0
21	FW	(Germany) GER	Tim Skarke	6	0	0+3	0	0+1	0	0+2	0

Source: Soccerway
