= David Preu =

German footballer

Personal information
- Date of birth: 26 October 2004 (age 22)
- Place of birth: Munich, Germany
- Height: 1.72 m (5 ft 8 in)
- Position: Winger

Team information
- Current team: VfB Stuttgart II
- Number: 37

Youth career
- 2018–2019: Viktoria 1889 Berlin
- 2019–2023: Union Berlin

Senior career*
Years	Team	Apps	(Gls)
2023–2026	Union Berlin	5	(0)
2023–2024	→ VfR Aalen (loan)	30	(1)
2026–	VfB Stuttgart II	0	(0)
- * Club domestic league appearances and goals as of 16 May 2026

David Preu (born 26 October 2004) is a German professional footballer who plays as a winger for 3. Liga side VfB Stuttgart II.

== Club career ==
A youth product of Viktoria 1889 Berlin, Preu moved to Union Berlin in 2019 where he finished his development. He joined VfR Aalen on a season-long loan in the Regionalliga on 23 June 2024. On 7 October 2024 he extended his contract with Union Berlin upon returning to the club. On 12 April 2025, he debuted with Union Berlin in a 0–0 Bundesliga tie with Bayer Leverkusen.

On 2 July 2026, Preu signed with VfB Stuttgart and was assigned to their reserve side VfB Stuttgart II in 3. Liga.

== Career statistics ==
As of match played 17 May 2025

Appearances and goals by club, season and competition
Club	Season	League			Cup		Europe		Other		Total	
Club	Season	Division	Apps	Goals	Apps	Goals	Apps	Goals	Apps	Goals	Apps	Goals
Union Berlin	2023–24	Bundesliga	0	0	0	0	0	0	—		0	0
Union Berlin	2024–25	Bundesliga	5	0	0	0	—		—		5	0
Union Berlin	Total		5	0	0	0	0	0	—		5	0
VfR Aalen (loan)	2023–24	Regionalliga Südwest	30	1	—		—		—		30	1
Career total			35	1	0	0	0	0	0	0	35	1
