= 2023–24 1. FC Union Berlin season =

1. FC Union Berlin
2023–24 season
- President: Dirk Zingler
- Head coach: Urs Fischer (until 15 November); Marco Grote (interim, from 15 to 26 November); Nenad Bjelica (from 26 November to 6 May); Marco Grote (interim, from 6 May)
- Stadium: Stadion An der Alten Försterei; Olympiastadion (European matches)
- Bundesliga: 15th
- DFB-Pokal: Second round
- UEFA Champions League: Group stage
- Top goalscorer: League: Robin Gosens (6); All: Robin Gosens (7)
Home colours	Away colours	Third colours

The 2023–24 season was 1. FC Union Berlin's 118th season in existence and fifth consecutive season in the Bundesliga. They also competed in the DFB-Pokal and the UEFA Champions League for the first time.

== Players ==
=== First-team squad ===
As of 1 February 2024

Note: Flags indicate national team as defined under FIFA eligibility rules; some limited exceptions apply. Players may hold more than one non-FIFA nationality.

No.	Pos.	Nation	Player
1	GK	DEN	Frederik Rønnow
2	DF	GER	Kevin Vogt
3	DF	GER	Paul Jaeckel
4	DF	POR	Diogo Leite
5	DF	NED	Danilho Doekhi (3rd captain)
6	DF	GER	Robin Gosens
7	MF	USA	Brenden Aaronson (on loan from Leeds United)
8	MF	GER	Rani Khedira
9	FW	DEN	Mikkel Kaufmann
10	FW	GER	Kevin Volland
11	FW	CIV	Chris Bedia
12	GK	DEN	Jakob Busk
13	MF	HUN	András Schäfer

No.	Pos.	Nation	Player
14	FW	BEL	Yorbe Vertessen
16	FW	GER	Benedict Hollerbach
18	DF	CRO	Josip Juranović
19	MF	GER	Janik Haberer
20	MF	TUN	Aïssa Laïdouni
26	DF	GLP	Jérôme Roussillon
28	DF	AUT	Christopher Trimmel (captain)
29	MF	FRA	Lucas Tousart
31	DF	GER	Robin Knoche
33	MF	CZE	Alex Král (on loan from Spartak Moscow)
37	GK	GER	Alexander Schwolow
41	DF	GER	Oluwaseum Ogbemudia

=== Out on loan ===
Note: Flags indicate national team as defined under FIFA eligibility rules; some limited exceptions apply. Players may hold more than one non-FIFA nationality.

No.	Pos.	Nation	Player
—	MF	JPN	Keita Endo (on loan to FC Tokyo until 31 December 2024)
—	GK	GER	Lennart Grill (on loan to VfL Osnabrück until 30 June 2024)
—	MF	GER	Aljoscha Kemlein (on loan to FC St. Pauli until 30 June 2024)
—	FW	GER	Jamie Leweling (on loan to VfB Stuttgart until 30 June 2024)
—	FW	USA	Jordan Pefok (on loan to Borussia Mönchengladbach until 30 June 2024)
—	FW	GER	David Preu (on loan to VfR Aalen until 30 June 2024)
—	DF	POL	Tymoteusz Puchacz (on loan to 1. FC Kaiserslautern until 30 June 2024)
—	MF	GER	Tim Skarke (on loan to Darmstadt 98 until 30 June 2024)
—	GK	GER	Yannic Stein (on loan to VfB Lübeck until 30 June 2024)
—	MF	NOR	Morten Thorsby (on loan to Genoa until 30 June 2024)

== Transfers ==
=== In ===
Pos.	Player	Transferred from	Date	Source
GK	(Germany) Lennart Grill	(Germany) Bayer Leverkusen	1 July 2023	
FW	(Denmark) Mikkel Kaufmann	(Denmark) Copenhagen	1 July 2023	
MF	(Czech Republic) Alex Král	(Russia) Spartak Moscow	1 July 2023	
DF	(Portugal) Diogo Leite	(Portugal) Porto	1 July 2023	
MF	(United States) Brenden Aaronson	(England) Leeds United	9 July 2023	
FW	(Ivory Coast) David Datro Fofana	(England) Chelsea	11 July 2023	
MF	(France) Lucas Tousart	(Germany) Hertha BSC	19 July 2023	
GK	(Germany) Alexander Schwolow	(Germany) Hertha BSC	26 July 2023	
FW	(Germany) Benedict Hollerbach	(Germany) Wehen Wiesbaden	27 July 2023	
MF	(Germany) Robin Gosens	(Italy) Inter Milan	15 August 2023	
FW	(Germany) Kevin Volland	(France) Monaco	17 August 2023	
DF	(Italy) Leonardo Bonucci	(Italy) Juventus	1 September 2023	
DF	(Germany) Kevin Vogt	(Germany) 1899 Hoffenheim	11 January 2024	
FW	(Ivory Coast) Chris Bedia	(Switzerland) Servette	18 January 2024	
FW	(Belgium) Yorbe Vertessen	(Netherlands) PSV Eindhoven	1 February 2024	

=== Out ===
Pos.	Player	Transferred to	Date	Source
DF	(Germany) Niko Gießelmann	(Germany) Greuther Fürth	1 July 2023	
MF	(Germany) Tim Maciejewski	(Germany) SV Sandhausen	1 July 2023	
FW	(Germany) Sven Michel	(Germany) FC Augsburg	1 July 2023	
MF	(Germany) Kevin Möhwald	(Belgium) Eupen	1 July 2023	
MF	(Germany) Levin Öztunalı	(Germany) Hamburger SV	1 July 2023	
DF	(Poland) Tymoteusz Puchacz	(Germany) 1. FC Kaiserslautern	1 July 2023	
MF	(Germany) Paul Seguin	(Germany) Schalke 04	1 July 2023	
FW	(Germany) David Preu	(Germany) VfR Aalen	2 July 2023	
GK	(Germany) Lennart Grill	(Germany) VfL Osnabrück	10 July 2023	
DF	(Netherlands) Rick van Drongelen	(Turkey) Samsunspor	11 July 2023	
FW	(Germany) Jamie Leweling	(Germany) VfB Stuttgart	13 July 2023	
MF	(Norway) Morten Thorsby	(Italy) Genoa	1 August 2023	
DF	(Germany) Mathis Bruns	(Germany) Stuttgarter Kickers	24 August 2023	
FW	(Serbia) Miloš Pantović	(Belgium) Eupen	28 August 2023	
DF	(Germany) Dominique Heintz	(Germany) 1. FC Köln	31 August 2023	
FW	(United States) Jordan Pefok	(Germany) Borussia Mönchengladbach	31 August 2023	
DF	(Germany) Tim Skarke	(Germany) Darmstadt 98	31 August 2023	
MF	(Japan) Keita Endo	(Japan) FC Tokyo	7 January 2024	
MF	(Germany) Aljoscha Kemlein	(Germany) FC St. Pauli	7 January 2024	
GK	(Germany) Yannic Stein	(Germany) VfB Lübeck	9 January 2024	
DF	(Italy) Leonardo Bonucci	(Turkey) Fenerbahçe	11 January 2024	
FW	(Suriname) Sheraldo Becker	(Spain) Real Sociedad	18 January 2024	
MF	(Germany) Laurenz Dehl	Austria Klagenfurt	23 January 2024	
FW	(Germany) Kevin Behrens	(Germany) VfL Wolfsburg	31 January 2024	
DF	(Germany) Mathis Bruns		1 February 2024	

== Pre-season and friendlies ==
Win Draw Loss

12 July 2023 Friendly	Luckenwalde	0–2	Union Berlin	Luckenwalde
18:30 CEST (UTC+2)		Report	Pefok 3'; Haberer 6'	Stadium: Werner-Seelenbinder-Stadion; Attendance: 3,044

15 July 2023 Friendly	Zalaegerszeg	3–2	Union Berlin	Zalaegerszeg, Hungary
16:30 CEST (UTC+2)	Sajbán 1', 28'; Ubochioma 47'	Report	Kaufmann 45'; Aaronson 89'	Stadium: ZTE Arena

19 July 2023 Friendly	Union Berlin	3–0	Rapid Wien	Berlin
18:15 CEST (UTC+2)	Behrens 53', 74'; Fofana 56'	Report		Stadium: Stadion An der Alten Försterei; Attendance: 17,284; Referee: Florian Lechner

22 July 2023 Friendly	Union Berlin	1–2	Holstein Kiel	Berlin
15:00 CEST (UTC+2)	Becker 110' (pen.)	Report	Juranović 8' (o.g.); Arp 95'	Stadium: Stadion An der Alten Försterei; Attendance: 13,014
Note: The match was played in four periods of thirty minutes each.

28 July 2023 Friendly	Pafos	2–1	Union Berlin	Saalfelden, Austria
16:00 CEST (UTC+2)	Felipe 80'; Abdusalamov 88'	Report	Heintz 49'	Stadium: Saalfelden-Arena; Attendance: 630

29 July 2023 Friendly	Udinese	0–1	Union Berlin	Lienz, Austria
15:30 CEST (UTC+2)		Report	Roussillon 73'	Stadium: Dolomitenstadion; Attendance: 1,500

5 August 2023 Friendly	Union Berlin	4–1	Atalanta	Berlin
15:30 CEST (UTC+2)	Laïdouni 8'; Behrens 25', (yellow card) 39'; Fofana 28', 51'; Král (yellow card) 54'	Report	Pašalić 33'; Bakker (yellow card) 35'; Lookman (yellow card) 64'	Stadium: Stadion An der Alten Försterei; Attendance: 20,065; Referee: Eric Weisbach

6 January 2024 Friendly	Union Berlin	2–0	Arminia Bielefeld	Berlin
15:30 CET (UTC+1)	Aaronson 54'; Haberer 59'	Report		Stadium: Stadion An der Alten Försterei; Attendance: 14,107

21 March 2024 Friendly	Union Berlin	3–1	1. FC Magdeburg	Berlin
12:00 CET (UTC+1)	Hollerbach 10', 31'; Bedia 59'	Report	Schuler 56'	Stadium: Stadion An der Alten Försterei; Attendance: 3,711

== Competitions ==
=== Overall record ===
Competition	First match	Last match	Starting round	Final position	Record							
Competition	First match	Last match	Starting round	Final position	Pld	W	D	L	GF	GA	GD	Win %
Bundesliga	20 August 2023	18 May 2024	Matchday 1	15th	34	9	6	19	33	58	−25	26.47
DFB-Pokal	13 August 2023	31 October 2023	First round	Second round	2	1	0	1	4	1	+3	50.00
UEFA Champions League	20 September 2023	12 December 2023	Group stage	Group stage	6	0	2	4	6	10	−4	0.00
Total					42	10	8	24	43	69	−26	23.81

Source: Soccerway

=== Bundesliga ===
==== League table ====
Pos	Team	Pld	W	D	L	GF	GA	GD	Pts	Qualification or relegation
13	Mainz 05	34	7	14	13	39	51	−12	35	
14	Borussia Mönchengladbach	34	7	13	14	56	67	−11	34	
15	Union Berlin	34	9	6	19	33	58	−25	33	
16	VfL Bochum (O)	34	7	12	15	42	74	−32	33	Qualification for the relegation play-offs
17	1. FC Köln (R)	34	5	12	17	28	60	−32	27	Relegation to 2. Bundesliga

Source: DFB
Rules for classification: 1) Points; 2) Goal difference; 3) Goals scored; 4) Head-to-head results; 5) Head-to-head away goals scored; 6) Away goals scored; 7) Play-off.
(O) Play-off winners; (R) Relegated

==== Results summary ====
Overall								Home						Away					
Pld	W	D	L	GF	GA	GD	Pts	W	D	L	GF	GA	GD	W	D	L	GF	GA	GD
34	9	6	19	33	58	−25	33	7	2	8	22	30	−8	2	4	11	11	28	−17

Source: DFB

==== Results by round ====
Round	1	2	3	4	5	6	7	8	9	10	11	12	13	14	15	16	17	18	19	20	21	22	23	24	25	26	27	28	29	30	31	32	33	34
Ground	H	A	H	A	H	A	A	H	A	H	A	H	A	H	A	H	A	A	H	A	H	A	H	H	A	H	A	H	A	H	A	H	A	H
Result	W	W	L	L	L	L	L	L	L	L	L	D	L	W	L	W	D	D	W	L	W	W	D	L	L	W	D	L	L	L	D	L	L	W
Position	3	1	5	8	10	11	13	15	15	16	18	17	18	15	15	15	15	15	15	15	15	13	14	14	14	13	12	13	13	14	14	15	16	15

Source: DFB
A = Away; H = Home; W = Win; D = Draw; L = Loss

==== Matches ====
The league fixtures were unveiled on 30 June 2023.

20 August 2023 1	Union Berlin	4–1	Mainz 05	Berlin
15:30 CEST (UTC+2)	Behrens 1', 9', 70', (yellow card) 11'; Pantović 90+6'	Report	Lee (yellow card) 31'; Kohr (yellow card) 51'; Da Costa (yellow card) 59'; Ajorque (penalty missed) 62', 88'; Caci 64'; Barreiro (yellow card) 80'; Van den Berg (yellow card) 90+2'	Stadium: Stadion An der Alten Försterei; Attendance: 22,012; Referee: Tobias Stieler

26 August 2023 2	Darmstadt 98	1–4	Union Berlin	Darmstadt
15:30 CEST (UTC+2)	Mehlem 24', (yellow card) 34'; Manu (yellow card) 44'	Report	Gosens 4', 34'; Aaronson (yellow card) 5' (yellow-red card) 21'; Behrens 39'; Doekhi 65'	Stadium: Merck-Stadion am Böllenfalltor; Attendance: 17,810; Referee: Patrick Ittrich

3 September 2023 3	Union Berlin	0–3	RB Leipzig	Berlin
17:30 CEST (UTC+2)	Král (yellow card) 27'; Volland (red card) 64'; Gosens (yellow card) 81'; Haberer (yellow card) 81'	Report	Henrichs (yellow card) 26'; Simons 51'; Šeško 85', 87'	Stadium: Stadion An der Alten Försterei; Attendance: 22,012; Referee: Daniel Schlager

16 September 2023 4	VfL Wolfsburg	2–1	Union Berlin	Wolfsburg
15:30 CEST (UTC+2)	Wind 12'; Mæhle 30'; Svanberg (yellow card) 78'	Report	Gosens 28'	Stadium: Volkswagen Arena; Attendance: 21,917; Referee: Felix Brych

23 September 2023 5	Union Berlin	0–2	1899 Hoffenheim	Berlin
15:30 CEST (UTC+2)	Tousart (yellow card) 72'	Report	Kramarić 22' (pen.), (yellow card) 45+5'; Beier 38'; Stach (yellow card) 54'; Becker (yellow card) 89'	Stadium: Stadion An der Alten Försterei; Attendance: 20,000; Referee: Deniz Aytekin

30 September 2023 6	1. FC Heidenheim	1–0	Union Berlin	Heidenheim
15:30 CEST (UTC+2)	Pieringer (yellow card) 48'; Beste 59'	Report	Leite (yellow card) 40'; Král (yellow card) 77'	Stadium: Voith-Arena; Attendance: 15,000; Referee: Sascha Stegemann

7 October 2023 7	Borussia Dortmund	4–2	Union Berlin	Dortmund
15:30 CEST (UTC+2)	Füllkrug 7'; Hummels (yellow card) 30'; Schlotterbeck 49'; Brandt 54'; Ryerson 71'	Report	Gosens 9', (yellow card) 64'; Bonucci 31' (pen.)	Stadium: Signal Iduna Park; Attendance: 81,365; Referee: Patrick Ittrich

21 October 2023 8	Union Berlin	0–3	VfB Stuttgart	Berlin
15:30 CEST (UTC+2)	Haberer (yellow card) 34'; Behrens (yellow card) 49'	Report	Guirassy 16'; Rouault (yellow card) 34'; Silas 81'; Undav 88'	Stadium: Stadion An der Alten Försterei; Attendance: 22,012; Referee: Bastian Dankert

28 October 2023 9	Werder Bremen	2–0	Union Berlin	Bremen
13:30 CEST (UTC+2)	Knoche 38' (o.g.); Stage (yellow card) 73'; Ducksch 75'	Report	Gosens (yellow card) 56'; Khedira (red card) 60'; Leite (yellow card) 80'; Hollerbach (yellow card) 85'; Laïdouni (yellow card) 90+6'	Stadium: Weserstadion; Attendance: 42,100; Referee: Tobias Stieler

4 November 2023 10	Union Berlin	0–3	Eintracht Frankfurt	Berlin
15:30 CET (UTC+1)		Report	Marmoush 2', 14'; Koch (yellow card) 29'; Ferri 82'	Stadium: Stadion An der Alten Försterei; Attendance: 22,012; Referee: Sven Jablonski

12 November 2023 11	Bayer Leverkusen	4–0	Union Berlin	Leverkusen
15:30 CET (UTC+1)	Grimaldo 23'; Kossounou 57'; Tah 73'; Tella 83'	Report	Rönnow (yellow card) 74'	Stadium: BayArena; Attendance: 29,387; Referee: Timo Gerach

25 November 2023 12	Union Berlin	1–1	FC Augsburg	Berlin
15:30 CET (UTC+1)	Gosens (yellow card) 37'; Haberer (yellow card) 45+6'; Knoche (penalty missed) 58'; Volland 88'	Report	Demirović 39' (pen.); Dahmen (yellow card) 87'; Mbabu (yellow card) 90+5'	Stadium: Stadion An der Alten Försterei; Attendance: 22,012; Referee: Florian Badstübner

9 December 2023 14	Union Berlin	3–1	Borussia Mönchengladbach	Berlin
15:30 CET (UTC+1)	Volland 24' (pen.); Juranović (yellow card) 29'; Hollerbach 50'; Kaufmann 75'	Report	Scally (yellow card) 3'; Weigl (yellow card) 33'; Pléa (yellow card) 47', (goal) 77'	Stadium: Stadion An der Alten Försterei; Attendance: 22,012; Referee: Martin Petersen

16 December 2023 15	VfL Bochum	3–0	Union Berlin	Bochum
15:30 CET (UTC+1)	Osterhage (yellow card) 20'; Asano 45+5'; Paciência 54'; Stöger 78' (pen.), (yellow card) 90+1'	Report	Khedira (yellow card) 42'; Roussillon (yellow card) 85'	Stadium: Vonovia Ruhrstadion; Attendance: 25,300; Referee: Sven Jablonski

20 December 2023 16	Union Berlin	2–0	1. FC Köln	Berlin
18:30 CET (UTC+1)	Hollerbach 55'; Fofana 78'	Report		Stadium: Stadion An der Alten Försterei; Attendance: 22,012; Referee: Deniz Aytekin

13 January 2024 17	SC Freiburg	0–0	Union Berlin	Freiburg
15:30 CET (UTC+1)		Report	Aaronson (yellow card) 50'; Rönnow (yellow card) 90+5'	Stadium: Europa-Park Stadion; Attendance: 33,800; Referee: Christian Dingert

24 January 2024 13	Bayern Munich	1–0	Union Berlin	Munich
20:30 CET (UTC+1)	Guerreiro 46'; Sané (yellow card) 74'; Kane (yellow card) 90+5'	Report	Behrens (yellow card) 48'; Vogt (yellow card) 90+5'; Haberer (yellow card) 90+5'; Leite (yellow card) 90+6'	Stadium: Allianz Arena; Attendance: 75,000; Referee: Frank Willenborg
Note: The match was originally scheduled for 2 December 2023, but was postponed due to heavy snowfall.

28 January 2024 19	Union Berlin	1–0	Darmstadt 98	Berlin
15:30 CET (UTC+1)	Hollerbach 62'; Trimmel (yellow card) 77'; Vogt (yellow card) 81'; Schäfer (yellow card) 83'	Report	Zimmermann (yellow card) 75'; Gjasula (yellow card) 83'	Stadium: Stadion An der Alten Försterei; Attendance: 21,786; Referee: Harm Osmers

4 February 2024 20	RB Leipzig	2–0	Union Berlin	Leipzig
17:30 CET (UTC+1)	Openda 11'; Kampl (yellow card) 20'; Šeško 48'	Report	Hollerbach (yellow card) 22'; Tousart (yellow card) 47'; Trimmel (red card) 73'	Stadium: Red Bull Arena; Attendance: 44,032; Referee: Marco Fritz

7 February 2024 18	Mainz 05	1–1	Union Berlin	Mainz
18:30 CET (UTC+1)	Ajorque (yellow card) 15'; Burkardt 45+8'; Kohr (yellow card) 89'	Report	Gosens 45+13'; Vogt (yellow card) 53'; Leite (yellow card) 79'; Haberer (yellow card) 84'; Doekhi (yellow card) 89'	Stadium: Mewa Arena; Attendance: 26,200; Referee: Martin Petersen
Note: The match was originally scheduled for 19 January 2024, but was postponed due to icing in the stands.

10 February 2024 21	Union Berlin	1–0	VfL Wolfsburg	Berlin
15:30 CET (UTC+1)	Doekhi 45+21'; Roussillon (yellow card) 85'	Report	Arnold (yellow card) 90+1'; Pervan (yellow card) 90+5'	Stadium: Stadion An der Alten Försterei; Attendance: 21,816; Referee: Matthias Jöllenbeck
Note: The match was suspended in the 39th and 43rd minutes due to fan protests.

17 February 2024 22	1899 Hoffenheim	0–1	Union Berlin	Sinsheim
15:30 CET (UTC+1)	Nsoki (yellow card) 45' (yellow-red card) 45+3'; Kadeřábek (yellow card) 86'	Report	Volland (yellow card) 45' (yellow-red card) 45+6'; Doekhi (yellow card) 45+9'; Aaronson 84'; Leite (yellow card) 89'	Stadium: PreZero Arena; Attendance: 19,050; Referee: Robert Hartmann

24 February 2024 23	Union Berlin	2–2	1. FC Heidenheim	Berlin
15:30 CET (UTC+1)	Gosens 44', (yellow card) 45'; Schäfer 45+2'; Juranović (yellow card) 53'	Report	Dovedan 3'; Beste 71'; Traoré (yellow card) 87'	Stadium: Stadion An der Alten Försterei; Attendance: 21,341; Referee: Deniz Aytekin

2 March 2024 24	Union Berlin	0–2	Borussia Dortmund	Berlin
15:30 CET (UTC+1)	Haberer (yellow card) 75'; Vertessen (yellow card) 90+5'	Report	Adeyemi 41'; Ryerson (yellow card) 45'; Maatsen 90'	Stadium: Stadion An der Alten Försterei; Attendance: 22,012; Referee: Christian Dingert

8 March 2024 25	VfB Stuttgart	2–0	Union Berlin	Stuttgart
20:30 CET (UTC+1)	Guirassy 19'; Führich 65'; Vagnoman (yellow card) 84'	Report	Khedira (yellow card) 39'; Schäfer (red card) 69'; Tousart (yellow card) 77'	Stadium: MHPArena; Attendance: 53,800; Referee: Robert Schröder

16 March 2024 26	Union Berlin	2–1	Werder Bremen	Berlin
15:30 CET (UTC+1)	Vogt (yellow card) 26'; Gosens (yellow card) 27'; Tousart (yellow card) 30'; Vertessen 50'; Aaronson 52'	Report	Weiser (yellow card) 38', (goal) 63'; Ducksch (yellow card) 41'; Stage (yellow card) 72'; Keïta (yellow card) 90'	Stadium: Stadion An der Alten Försterei; Attendance: 22,012; Referee: Daniel Schlager

30 March 2024 27	Eintracht Frankfurt	0–0	Union Berlin	Frankfurt
15:30 CET (UTC+1)	Ekitike (yellow card) 24'; Nkounkou (yellow card) 38'; Pacho (yellow card) 90'; Buck (yellow card) 90+8'	Report	Leite (yellow card) 61'	Stadium: Deutsche Bank Park; Attendance: 57,100; Referee: Marco Fritz

6 April 2024 28	Union Berlin	0–1	Bayer Leverkusen	Berlin
15:30 CEST (UTC+2)	Gosens (yellow card) 9' (yellow-red card) 45+3'; Tousart (yellow card) 37'	Report	Wirtz 45+8' (pen.); Adli (yellow card) 64'; Andrich (yellow card) 82'	Stadium: Stadion An der Alten Försterei; Attendance: 22,012; Referee: Benjamin Brand

12 April 2024 29	FC Augsburg	2–0	Union Berlin	Augsburg
20:30 CEST (UTC+2)	Tietz 47'; Michel 82'; Breithaupt (yellow card) 90+2'	Report	Khedira (yellow card) 37'	Stadium: WWK Arena; Attendance: 29,731; Referee: Tobias Stieler

20 April 2024 30	Union Berlin	1–5	Bayern Munich	Berlin
18:30 CEST (UTC+2)	Vertessen 90+1'	Report	Goretzka 29'; Kane 45+1'; Müller 53', 66'; Tel 62'	Stadium: Stadion An der Alten Försterei; Attendance: 22,012; Referee: Sven Jablonski

28 April 2024 31	Borussia Mönchengladbach	0–0	Union Berlin	Mönchengladbach
15:30 CEST (UTC+2)	Lainer (yellow card) 46'; Reitz (yellow card) 89'	Report	Vogt (yellow card) 44'; Khedira (yellow card) 48'	Stadium: Borussia-Park; Attendance: 53,723; Referee: Sascha Stegemann

5 May 2024 32	Union Berlin	3–4	VfL Bochum	Berlin
15:30 CEST (UTC+2)	Vertessen 59'; Bedia 48'; Hollerbach 74'	Report	Wittek 16', 31'; Schlotterbeck 37'; Hofmann 70'; Gamboa (yellow card) 90+5'	Stadium: Stadion An der Alten Försterei; Attendance: 22,012; Referee: Marco Fritz

11 May 2024 33	1. FC Köln	3–2	Union Berlin	Cologne
15:30 CEST (UTC+2)	Schmitz (yellow card) 36'; Kainz 45' (pen.); Martel (yellow card) 53'; Huseinbašić (yellow card) 74'; Tigges 87'; Downs 90+3'	Report	Knoche 15'; Volland 19' (pen.); Khedira (yellow card) 44'; Juranović (yellow card) 84'	Stadium: RheinEnergieStadion; Attendance: 50,000; Referee: Deniz Aytekin

18 May 2024 34	Union Berlin	2–1	SC Freiburg	Berlin
15:30 CEST (UTC+2)	Haberer (penalty missed) 38', (yellow card) 85', (goal) 90+2'; Knoche (yellow card) 52'; Trimmel (yellow card) 67'; Hollerbach 68'; Juranović (yellow card) 70'; Gosens (yellow card) 75'; Volland (penalty missed) 90+2', (yellow card) 90+8'; Laïdouni (yellow card) 90+7'	Report	Makengo (yellow card) 37'; Dōan (yellow card) 54', (goal) 85'; Kübler (yellow card) 75'; Eggestein (yellow card) 90+1'	Stadium: Stadion An der Alten Försterei; Attendance: 22,012; Referee: Christian Dingert

=== DFB-Pokal ===
13 August 2023 First round	Astoria Walldorf	0–4	Union Berlin	Walldorf
18:00 CEST (UTC+2)	Carl (yellow card) 60'; Grimmer (yellow card) 79'	Report	Knoche 29' (pen.); Becker 38'; Leite 41'; Haberer 80'	Stadium: Dietmar-Hopp-Sportpark; Attendance: 4,000; Referee: Wolfgang Haslberger

31 October 2023 Second round	VfB Stuttgart	1–0	Union Berlin	Stuttgart
18:00 CET (UTC+1)	Undav 45'; Stergiou (yellow card) 88'; Itō (yellow card) 90+1'	Report	Tousart (yellow card) 85'; Gosens (yellow card) 90+1'	Stadium: MHPArena; Attendance: 54,000; Referee: Sascha Stegemann

=== UEFA Champions League ===
==== Group stage ====
The draw for the group stage was held on 31 August 2023.

Pos	Team	Pld	W	D	L	GF	GA	GD	Pts	Qualification	RMA	NAP	BRA	UNB
1	(Spain) Real Madrid	6	6	0	0	16	7	+9	18	Advance to knockout phase	—	4–2	3–0	1–0
2	(Italy) Napoli	6	3	1	2	10	9	+1	10	Advance to knockout phase	2–3	—	2–0	1–1
3	(Portugal) Braga	6	1	1	4	6	12	−6	4	Transfer to Europa League	1–2	1–2	—	1–1
4	(Germany) Union Berlin	6	0	2	4	6	10	−4	2		2–3	0–1	2–3	—

Source: UEFA
Rules for classification: Group stage tiebreakers

20 September 2023 1	Real Madrid (Spain)	1–0	(Germany) Union Berlin	Madrid, Spain
18:45 CEST (UTC+2)	Tchouaméni (yellow card) 37'; Bellingham 90+4'	Report	Tousart (yellow card) 1'	Stadium: Santiago Bernabéu; Attendance: 65,207; Referee: Espen Eskås (Norway)

3 October 2023 2	Union Berlin (Germany)	2–3	(Portugal) Braga	Berlin
18:45 CEST (UTC+2)	Bonucci (yellow card) 13'; Becker 30', 37'; Leite (yellow card) 54'; Juranović (yellow card) 90+5'	Report	R. Horta (yellow card) 13'; Niakaté 41'; Banza (yellow card) 46'; Bruma 51'; Zalazar (yellow card) 72'; Castro 90+4'	Stadium: Olympiastadion; Attendance: 73,445; Referee: Srđan Jovanović (Serbia)
Note: Union Berlin played their European home matches at the Olympiastadion, instead of their regular stadium, the Stadion An der Alten Försterei, which did not meet UEFA requirements.

24 October 2023 3	Union Berlin (Germany)	0–1	(Italy) Napoli	Berlin
21:00 CEST (UTC+2)	Trimmel (yellow card) 10'; Gosens (yellow card) 51'; Haberer (yellow card) 53'	Report	Rrahmani (yellow card) 17'; Raspadori 65'	Stadium: Olympiastadion; Attendance: 72,062; Referee: Irfan Peljto (Bosnia and Herzegovina)
Note: Union Berlin played their European home matches at the Olympiastadion, instead of their regular stadium, the Stadion An der Alten Försterei, which did not meet UEFA requirements.

8 November 2023 4	Napoli (Italy)	1–1	(Germany) Union Berlin	Naples, Italy
18:45 CET (UTC+1)	Politano 39'; Simeone (yellow card) 89'	Report	Bonucci (yellow card) 41'; Fofana 52'; Jaeckel (yellow card) 67'; Tousart (yellow card) 76'	Stadium: Stadio Diego Armando Maradona; Attendance: 42,449; Referee: Danny Makkelie (Netherlands)

29 November 2023 5	Braga (Portugal)	1–1	(Germany) Union Berlin	Braga, Portugal
21:00 CET (UTC+1)	Niakaté (red card) 30'; Gómez (yellow card) 33'; Zalazar (yellow card) 45+1'; Djaló 51'	Report	Knoche (yellow card) 3'; Tousart (yellow card) 39'; Gosens 42'; Bonucci (yellow card) 45+4'; Khedira (yellow card) 54'	Stadium: Estádio Municipal; Attendance: 15,855; Referee: Clément Turpin (France)

12 December 2023 6	Union Berlin (Germany)	2–3	(Spain) Real Madrid	Berlin
21:00 CET (UTC+1)	Khedira (yellow card) 35'; Volland 45+1'; Laïdouni (yellow card) 76'; Král 85'	Report	Bellingham (yellow card) 35'; Modrić (penalty missed) 45'; Alaba (yellow card) 55'; Joselu 61', 72'; Ceballos 89'	Stadium: Olympiastadion; Attendance: 73,420; Referee: Rade Obrenovič (Slovenia)
Note: Union Berlin played their European home matches at the Olympiastadion, instead of their regular stadium, the Stadion An der Alten Försterei, which did not meet UEFA requirements.

== Statistics ==
=== Appearances and goals ===
No.	Pos	Nat	Player	Total		Bundesliga		DFB-Pokal		Champions League	
No.	Pos	Nat	Player	Apps	Goals	Apps	Goals	Apps	Goals	Apps	Goals
Goalkeepers
1	GK	(Denmark) DEN	Frederik Rønnow	33	0	25	0	2	0	6	0
12	GK	(Denmark) DEN	Jakob Busk	0	0	0	0	0	0	0	0
38	GK	(Germany) GER	Laurenz Dehl	0	0	0	0	0	0	0	0
Defenders
2	DF	(Germany) GER	Kevin Vogt	9	0	9	0	0	0	0	0
3	DF	(Germany) GER	Paul Jaeckel	8	0	2+3	0	0	0	2+1	0
4	DF	(Portugal) POR	Diogo Leite	31	1	22+1	0	2	1	6	0
5	DF	(Netherlands) NED	Danilho Doekhi	19	2	15	2	1	0	3	0
18	DF	(Croatia) CRO	Josip Juranović	20	0	11+3	0	1	0	5	0
26	DF	(Guadeloupe) GLP	Jérôme Roussillon	26	0	7+13	0	2	0	3+1	0
28	DF	(Austria) AUT	Christopher Trimmel	23	0	12+6	0	1+1	0	1+2	0
31	DF	(Germany) GER	Robin Knoche	24	1	18+1	0	2	1	3	0
Midfielders
6	MF	(Germany) GER	Robin Gosens	29	7	19+3	6	0+1	0	5+1	1
8	MF	(Germany) GER	Rani Khedira	18	0	11+2	0	1	0	4	0
13	MF	(Hungary) HUN	András Schäfer	13	1	8+5	1	0	0	0	0
19	MF	(Germany) GER	Janik Haberer	24	1	14+4	0	0+1	1	4+1	0
20	MF	(Tunisia) TUN	Aïssa Laïdouni	25	0	10+7	0	2	0	3+3	0
29	MF	(France) FRA	Lucas Tousart	21	0	11+4	0	0+1	0	3+2	0
33	MF	(Czech Republic) CZE	Alex Král	28	1	12+8	0	1+1	0	2+4	1
Forwards
7	FW	(United States) USA	Brenden Aaronson	29	1	6+15	1	0+2	0	1+5	0
9	FW	(Denmark) DEN	Mikkel Kaufmann	13	1	1+11	1	0+1	0	0	0
10	FW	(Germany) GER	Kevin Volland	24	3	12+6	2	1	0	2+3	1
11	FW	(Ivory Coast) CIV	Chris Bedia	4	0	0+4	0	0	0	0	0
14	FW	(Belgium) BEL	Yorbe Vertessen	6	0	2+4	0	0	0	0	0
16	FW	(Germany) GER	Benedict Hollerbach	20	3	12+7	3	1	0	0	0
Players transferred out during the season
11	FW	(Ivory Coast) CIV	David Datro Fofana	17	2	8+4	1	1	0	2+2	1
17	FW	(Germany) GER	Kevin Behrens	25	4	14+4	4	2	0	4+1	0
21	FW	(Germany) GER	Tim Skarke	0	0	0	0	0	0	0	0
23	DF	(Italy) ITA	Leonardo Bonucci	10	1	6+1	1	0	0	3	0
27	FW	(Suriname) SUR	Sheraldo Becker	18	3	7+4	0	2	1	4+1	2
32	FW	(Serbia) SRB	Miloš Pantović	1	1	0+1	1	0	0	0	0
36	MF	(Germany) GER	Aljoscha Kemlein	3	0	0+2	0	0	0	0+1	0
45	FW	(United States) USA	Jordan Pefok	2	0	0+1	0	0+1	0	0	0
46	FW	(Germany) GER	Laurenz Dehl	0	0	0	0	0	0	0	0

Last updated: 8 March 2024
Source: Competitions

=== Goalscorers ===
As of 24 February 2023

Rank	Pos.	No.	Nat.	Player	Bundesliga	DFB-Pokal	Champions League	Total
1	DF	6	(Germany)	Robin Gosens	6	0	1	7
2	FW	17	(Germany)	Kevin Behrens	4	0	0	4
3	FW	27	(Suriname)	Sheraldo Becker	0	1	2	3
3	FW	10	(Germany)	Kevin Volland	2	0	1	3
3	FW	16	(Germany)	Benedict Hollerbach	3	0	0	3
6	DF	5	(Netherlands)	Danilho Doekhi	2	0	0	2
6	FW	11	(Ivory Coast)	David Datro Fofana	1	0	1	2
8	FW	32	(Serbia)	Miloš Pantović	1	0	0	1
8	DF	23	(Italy)	Leonardo Bonucci	1	0	0	1
8	FW	9	(Denmark)	Mikkel Kaufmann	1	0	0	1
8	DF	31	(Germany)	Robin Knoche	0	1	0	1
8	DF	4	(Portugal)	Diogo Leite	0	1	0	1
8	MF	19	(Germany)	Janik Haberer	0	1	0	1
8	MF	33	(Czech Republic)	Alex Král	0	0	1	1
8	FW	7	(United States)	Brenden Aaronson	1	0	0	1
8	MF	13	(Hungary)	András Schäfer	1	0	0	1
Own goals					0	0	0	0
Totals					23	4	6	33
