= Benedict Hollerbach =

German footballer (born 2001)

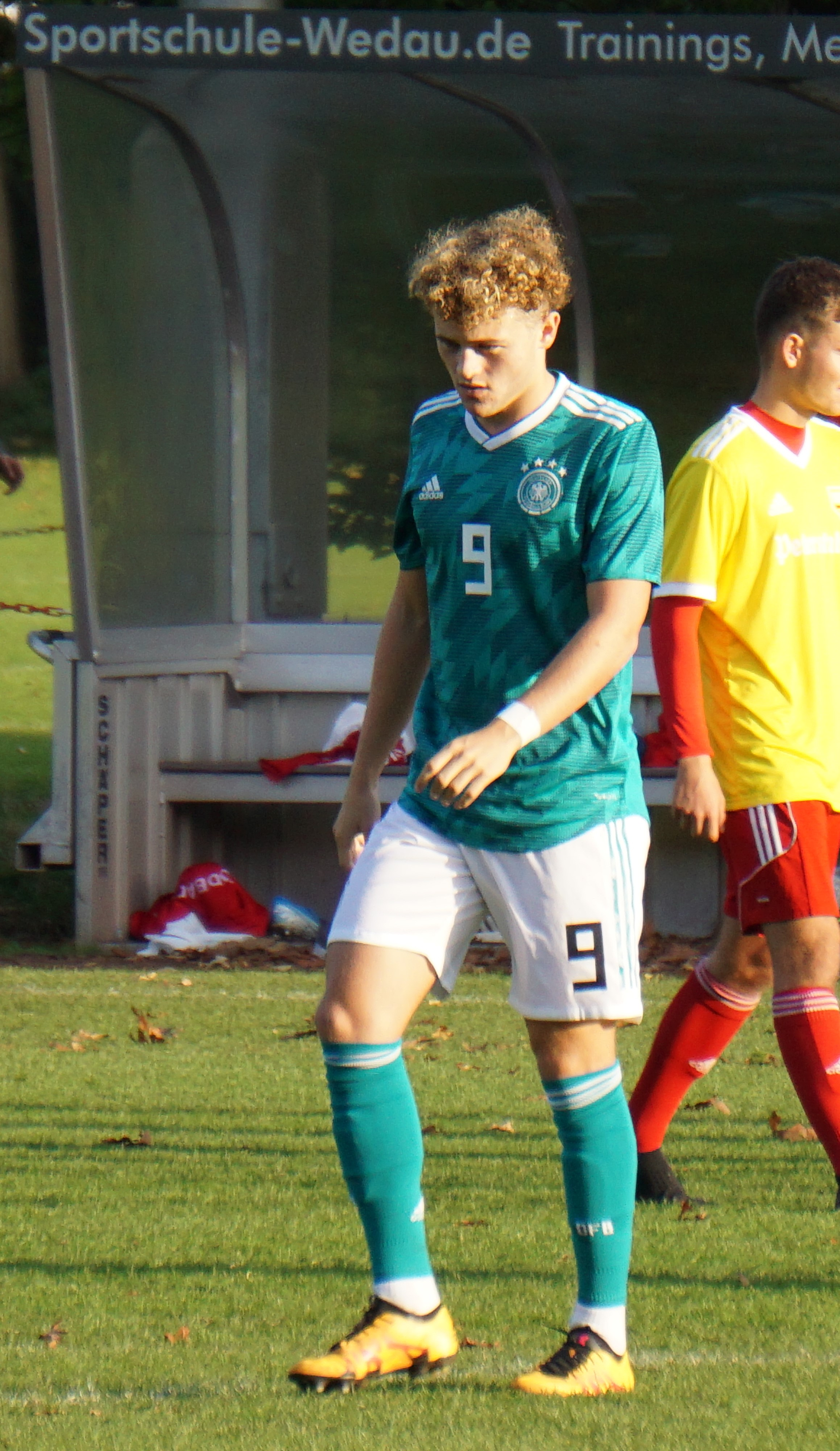
- Hollerbach in 2019

Personal information
- Full name: Benedict Hollerbach
- Date of birth: 17 May 2001 (age 25)
- Place of birth: Starnberg, Germany
- Height: 1.81 m (5 ft 11 in)
- Positions: Left winger; centre-forward

Team information
- Current team: Mainz 05
- Number: 17

Youth career
- –2014: TSV Tutzing
- 2014–2019: Bayern Munich
- 2019–2020: VfB Stuttgart

Senior career*
Years	Team	Apps	(Gls)
2020–2023	Wehen Wiesbaden	96	(18)
2023–2025	Union Berlin	62	(13)
2025–	Mainz 05	18	(3)

International career
2018	Germany U18	2	(1)
- * Club domestic league appearances and goals as of 30 October 2026

Benedict Hollerbach (born 17 May 2001) is a German professional footballer who plays as a left winger or centre-forward for Bundesliga side Mainz 05. He has played for Germany at under-18 level.

== Club career ==
After playing youth football with TSV Tutzing, Bayern Munich and VfB Stuttgart, Hollerbach signed for Wehen Wiesbaden on a three-year contract in September 2020.

In July 2023, Hollerbach signed for Union Berlin, moving to the top-flight Bundesliga for the first time in his career.

On 1 June 2025, it was announced that Hollerbach would join Mainz 05 by signing a contract until 2029.

== International career ==
Hollerbach has represented Germany at under-18 level.

== Career statistics ==
As of match played 30 October 2026

Appearances and goals by club, season and competition
Club	Season	League			DFB-Pokal		Europe		Other		Total	
Club	Season	Division	Apps	Goals	Apps	Goals	Apps	Goals	Apps	Goals	Apps	Goals
Wehen Wiesbaden	2020–21	3. Liga	28	3	1	0	—		—		29	3
Wehen Wiesbaden	2021–22	3. Liga	31	1	0	0	—		—		31	1
Wehen Wiesbaden	2022–23	3. Liga	37	14	0	0	—		2 (Note: Appearances in promotion play-off)	3	39	17
Wehen Wiesbaden	Total		96	18	1	0	—		2	3	100	21
Union Berlin	2023–24	Bundesliga	28	5	1	0	—		—		29	5
Union Berlin	2024–25	Bundesliga	34	8	2	0	—		—		36	8
Union Berlin	Total		62	13	3	0	—		—		65	13
Mainz 05	2025–26	Bundesliga	14	1	2	0	5 (Note: Appearances in UEFA Conference League)	1	—		21	2
Mainz 05	2026–27	Bundesliga	4	2	1	0	—		—		5	2
Mainz 05	Total		18	3	3	0	5	1	—		26	4
Career total			176	34	7	0	5	1	2	3	190	38
