= Goran Markov =

Macedonian footballer and coach

Personal information
- Full name: Goran Markov
- Date of birth: 27 February 1970 (age 56)
- Place of birth: Skopje, SFR Yugoslavia
- Height: 1.72 m (5 ft 8 in)
- Position: Striker

Youth career
- Tennis Borussia Berlin
- VfB Neukölln
- VfB Lichterfelde

Senior career*
Years	Team	Apps	(Gls)
1990–1991	Blau-Weiß 90 Berlin	10	(1)
1991–1993	Türkiyemspor Berlin		
1993–1995	Union Berlin	62	(41)
1995–1997	Hansa Rostock	7	(0)
1997–1998	Tennis Borussia Berlin	12	(1)
1998–1999	Wuppertaler SV		
1999–2002	TuS Makkabi Berlin		

Managerial career
- 2002–2007: Hertha BSC (youth)
- 2007–2009: Hertha BSC (third team)
- 2009–2010: Hertha BSC (youth)
- * Club domestic league appearances and goals

Goran Markov (born 27 February 1970) is a Macedonian football coach and a former player. He manages the third team of Hertha BSC. He also holds German citizenship.

Markov made seven appearances in the Bundesliga during his playing career.
