= Kevin Behrens =

German footballer

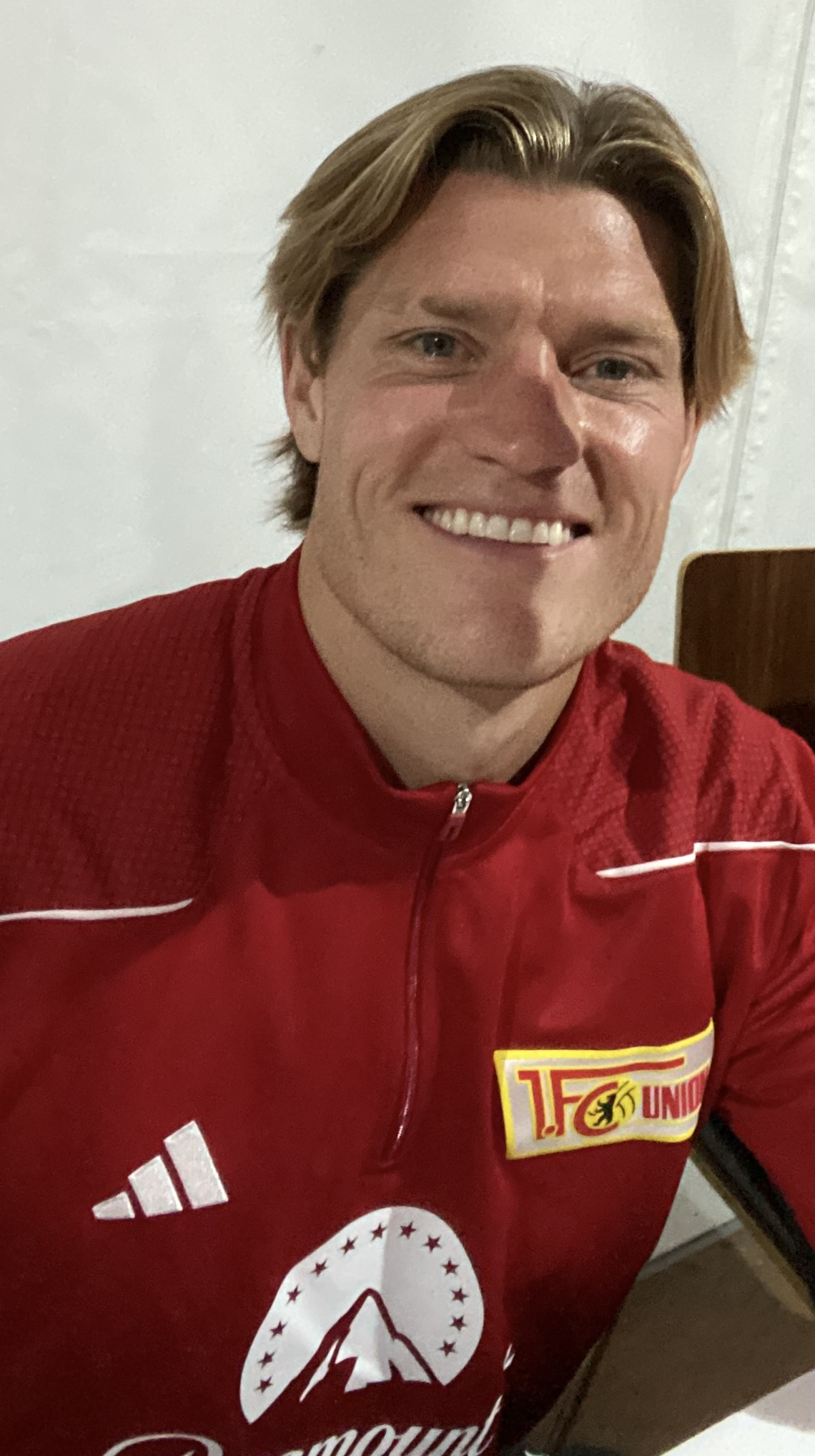
- Behrens with Union Berlin in 2023

Personal information
- Date of birth: 3 February 1991 (age 35)
- Place of birth: Bremen, Germany
- Height: 1.84 m (6 ft 0 in)
- Position: Forward

Team information
- Current team: Lugano
- Number: 91

Youth career
- 1995–2004: ATS Buntentor
- 2004–2008: SC Weyhe
- 2008–2010: Werder Bremen

Senior career*
Years	Team	Apps	(Gls)
2010–2011	Werder Bremen III	24	(10)
2011–2012	SV Wilhelmshaven	26	(10)
2012–2014	Hannover 96 II	40	(17)
2014–2015	Alemannia Aachen	28	(8)
2015–2016	Rot-Weiss Essen	8	(3)
2016–2018	1. FC Saarbrücken	78	(35)
2018–2021	SV Sandhausen	94	(31)
2021–2024	Union Berlin	75	(14)
2024–2025	VfL Wolfsburg	31	(2)
2025–	Lugano	37	(15)

International career^{‡}
2023	Germany	1	(0)
- * Club domestic league appearances and goals as of 28 September 2026 ‡ National team caps and goals as of 17 October 2023

Kevin Behrens (born 3 February 1991) is a German professional footballer who plays as a forward for Swiss Super League club Lugano. He previously played in the Bundesliga and one match for the Germany national team.

== Club career ==
Behrens started his career in 2010 in the Bremen-Liga, the fifth division of German football, for Werder Bremen III. From 2011-2018, he played in the Regionalliga, the fourth division of German football, for SV Wilhelmshaven, Hannover 96 II, Alemannia Aachen, Rot-Weiss Essen, 1. FC Saarbrücken. He made his 2. Bundesliga debut in 2018 with SV Sandhausen. With Saarbrücken, he won both the 2016–17 Saarland Cup and 2017–18 Regionalliga Südwest.

Behrens transferred to East Berlin-based Bundesliga club Union Berlin during the 2021 summer transfer window. On 16 September 2021, he scored his first goal in European competitions in a 3–1 defeat against Slavia Prague in the 2021–22 Conference League. On the first matchday of the 2023–24 Bundesliga season, Behrens scored his first Bundesliga hat-trick, all being headers, on 20 August 2023 at the Stadion An der Alten Försterei against 1. FSV Mainz 05 in a 4–1 home victory. On 20 September 2023, he made his UEFA Champions League debut in a 1–0 defeat against Real Madrid.

On 31 January 2024, Behrens moved to VfL Wolfsburg. In October that year, Wolfsburg fined Behrens for making a homophobic comment during an autograph session, refusing to sign a rainbow-themed Wolfsburg jersey. He later apologised, and the club reaffirmed its commitment to diversity and tolerance. Later that month, FC St. Pauli fans protested his appearance with a “more love, less Kevin Behrens” banner.

On 15 July 2025, Behrens signed a two-season contract with Lugano in Switzerland. On 9 January 2026, during a friendly match against Viktoria Plzen, during play, Behrens shoved teammate Georgios Koutsias to the ground and verbally berated him, causing teammate Uran Bislimi to intervene between the players. After the incident, Behrens requested to be substituted and the club issued a statement after the friendly in which they condemned the confrontation and announced an internal investigation into the incident.

== International career ==
In October 2023, Behrens received his first and only call-up to the German senior national team for two friendly matches against the United States and Mexico. He debuted against the latter on 17 October, coming on as a substitute at the 87th minute for Jamal Musiala in a match which ended in a 2–2 draw.

== Personal life ==
His sister Kim van de Velde (née Behrens) is a volleyball and beach volleyball player.

== Career statistics ==
=== Club ===
As of match played 21 December 2025

Appearances and goals by club, season and competition
Club	Season	League			National cup		Europe		Other		Total	
Club	Season	Division	Apps	Goals	Apps	Goals	Apps	Goals	Apps	Goals	Apps	Goals
Werder Bremen III	2010–11	Bremenliga	24	10	—		—		—		24	10
Wilhemshaven	2011–12	Regionalliga Nord	26	10	—		—		—		26	10
Hannover 96 II	2012–13	Regionalliga Nord	26	9	—		—		—		26	9
Hannover 96 II	2013–14	Regionalliga Nord	14	9	—		—		—		14	9
Hannover 96 II	Total		40	18	—		—		—		40	18
Alemannia Aachen	2014–15	Regionalliga West	28	8	3	0	—		—		31	8
Rot-Weiss Essen	2015–16	Regionalliga West	8	3	1	0	—		—		9	3
1. FC Saarbrücken	2015–16	Regionalliga Südwest	13	5	—		—		—		13	5
1. FC Saarbrücken	2016–17	Regionalliga Südwest	30	11	—		—		—		30	11
1. FC Saarbrücken	2017–18	Regionalliga Südwest	35	19	1	0	—		1 (Note: Appearance in Regionalliga promotion play-offs)	0	37	19
1. FC Saarbrücken	Total		78	35	1	0	—		1	0	80	35
SV Sandhausen	2018–19	2. Bundesliga	30	4	2	0	—		—		32	4
SV Sandhausen	2019–20	2. Bundesliga	32	14	1	0	—		—		33	14
SV Sandhausen	2020–21	2. Bundesliga	32	13	1	0	—		—		33	13
SV Sandhausen	Total		94	31	4	0	—		—		98	31
Union Berlin	2021–22	Bundesliga	24	2	4	2	6 (Note: Appearances in UEFA Europa Conference League)	2	—		34	6
Union Berlin	2022–23	Bundesliga	33	8	4	2	9 (Note: Appearances in UEFA Europa League)	0	—		46	10
Union Berlin	2023–24	Bundesliga	18	4	2	0	5 (Note: Appearances in UEFA Champions League)	0	—		25	4
Union Berlin	Total		75	14	10	4	20	2	0	0	105	20
VfL Wolfsburg	2023–24	Bundesliga	13	1	—		—		—		13	1
VfL Wolfsburg	2024–25	Bundesliga	18	1	1	0	—		—		19	1
VfL Wolfsburg	Total		31	2	1	0	—		—		32	2
Lugano	2025–26	Swiss Super League	19	6	0	0	4 (Note: Two appearances in UEFA Europa League, two appearances in UEFA Conference League)	0	—		23	6
Career total			424	137	20	4	24	2	1	0	469	143

=== International ===
As of match played 17 October 2023

Appearances and goals by national team and year
National team	Year	Apps	Goals
Germany
Germany	2023	1	0
Total		1	0

== Honours ==
1. FC Saarbrücken

- Saarland Cup: 2017
